= Rules Compendium =

2007 role-playing game supplement

- Editor: Chris Sims
- Genre: Role-playing game
- Publisher: Wizards of the Coast
- Publication date: October 2007
- Media type: Print (Hardback)
- Pages: 160
- ISBN: 978-0-7869-4725-6

Rules Compendium is a book written for the 3.5 edition of the Dungeons & Dragons fantasy role-playing game.

== Contents ==
The Rules Compendium consists of material that originally appeared in the Player's Handbook, Dungeon Master's Guide, Monster Manual, Book of Exalted Deeds, Complete Adventurer, Complete Arcane, Complete Warrior, Frostburn, Heroes of Horror, Libris Mortis, Magic Item Compendium, Player's Handbook II, Races of Destiny, Races of Stone, Races of the Wild, Sandstorm, Stormwrack, and Tome of Battle.

== Publication history ==
The book was compiled and edited by Chris Sims, and was released October 2007. Cover art was by Francis Tsai, with interior art by Steven Belledin, Peter Bergting, Matt Cavotta, Mitch Cotie, Eric Deschamps, Tony DiTerlizzi, Chad Dulac, Steve Ellis, Jason Engle, Carl Frank, Tomás Giorello, Rebecca Guay, Chris Hawkes, Ralph Horsley, David Hudnut, Jeremy Jarvis, Todd Lockwood, Howard Lyon, Warren Mahy, David Martin, Torstein Nordstrand, William O'Connor, Lucio Parrillo, Jim Pavelec, Michael Phillippi, Eric Polak, Steve Prescott, Wayne Reynolds, Darrell Riche, James Ryman, Noi Sackda, Ron Spencer, Anne Stokes, Mark Tedin, Joel Thomas, UDON, Franz Vohwinkel, Kevin Walker, David Walstrom, Sam Wood, Ben Wooten, Jim Zubkavich, and Mark Zug.

== Reception ==
Shannon Appelcline found that when the Rules Compendium "showed up on Wizard's schedule as a collection of all the basic rules for the game in a new format, it had a sense of finality to it" as 3.5 was coming to a close.
