= The Grand History of the Realms =

2007 role-playing game supplement

- Genre: Role-playing game
- Publisher: Wizards of the Coast
- Publication date: September 2007
- Media type: Print
- ISBN: 978-0-7869-4731-7

The Grand History of the Realms is a supplement to the 3.5 edition of the Dungeons & Dragons role-playing game.

== Contents ==
The Grand History of the Realms is an accessory for the Forgotten Realms which presents a definitive in-game history of the setting from the dawn of recorded history through the ancient days of Netheril and the Fallen Kingdoms, to the Time of Troubles and the upheavals of the present time in the setting. The text is accompanied by anecdotes, diary entries, letters, and historical texts created by famous personalities of Faerun, and an extensive and comprehensive timeline including a sneak peek into upcoming events.

== Publication history ==
The Grand History of the Realms was written by Brian R. James, Ed Greenwood, George Krashos, Eric L. Boyd and Thomas M. Costa, and published in September 2007. Cover art was by Todd Lockwood, with interior art by Kyle Anderson, Glen Angus, Steven Belledin, Matt Cavotta, Rafael Garres Cervantes, Ed Cox, Daarken, Wayne England, Jason A. Engle, Emily Fiegenschuh, Carl Frank, Ralph Horsley, Andrew Hou, David Hudnut, Jeremy Jarvis, Dana Knutson, Ginger Kubic, Stephanie Law, Howard Lyon, David Martin, Dennis Crabapple McClain, William O'Connor, Lucio Parrillo, Jim Pavelec, Michael Phillippi, Steve Prescott, Wayne Reynolds, Ron Spencer, Stephen Tappin, Joel Thomas, Derek Thompson, Franz Vohwinkel, Eva Widermann, and Sam Wood.

The book originated out of a fan project where James collated all Forgotten Realms events "according to their in-setting date". In the foreword of the book, Richard Baker wrote:

This was something unprecedented for us; for the first time in my long experience with TSR and Wizards of the Coast, we accepted an unsolicited, fan-created piece of work, originally available on the Internet, and put it out in our product schedule. The Grand History of the Realms is therefore not just an excellent Forgotten Realms resource, but also a truly revolutionary product and process for us. It's a sign that you, the readers and players of the Forgotten Realms campaign setting, are taking control of the creative process. [...] The Realms are more than what we say they are — they're what you say they are, too.

The original fan project was a 100-page PDF. The published book added "sidebars throughout, featuring commentary from Ed Greenwood and many other official Realms designers. These sidebars explain campaign features, discuss historical events, give first-person accounts of events as recounted by characters in the Forgotten Realms, and generally serve to round out the short descriptions of every notable event that has occurred in official products". This book acts as "a last hurrah for the setting before major changes (such as the Spellplague) implemented with 4e".

== Reception ==
John Baichtal, for Wired, wrote "even if you're not a Realms-head, this book has tons of value. Just as a guide for world creation, it's a great example. It forces you to think, how did this race or that empire become great? What became of it when its time passed? My only complaint about the book is the lack of bibliographical references. If the events of a novel are mentioned, might a footnote not be helpful for readers interested in learning more?"

Curtis D. Carbonell, in the book Dread Trident: Tabletop Role-Playing Games and the Modern Fantastic, wrote "The Grand History is important because it represents how a shared imaginary universe becomes realized through the combination of analog/digital tools made available to the public. [...] This reference-designed gametext represents the FR at its most robust, combining a history that stretches across three editions".

Kevin Kulp, game designer and admin of EN World, wrote "this book is a must-buy for anyone interested in the Forgotten Realms; there is literally no other publication that comes close to pulling so many disparate threads together into one cohesive, easily understood timeline. It's also extremely useful for DMs who homebrew their campaigns instead of playing in the official campaign setting. Many games lack the weight of history simply because the DM has neither time nor energy enough to build the many events needed to add texture to their world. [...] The Grand History of the Realms is a great example for how a DM can add that sort of detail into a game, and it provides perspective for the massive sweep of a campaign's history. [...] Value has been added over the original free PDF through maps, art, and sidebar commentary".
