= Spell Compendium =

Dungeons & Dragons rulebook

- cover of Spell Compendium
- Author: Matthew Sernett, Jeff Grubb, and Mike McArtor
- Genre: Role-playing game
- Publisher: Wizards of the Coast
- Publication date: December 2005
- Media type: Print (Hardback)
- Pages: 288
- ISBN: 0-7869-3702-5
- OCLC: 62870026
- LC Class: GV1469.62.D84 D836 2000

Spell Compendium is an optional, 288-page supplemental source book for the 3.5 edition of the Dungeons & Dragons roleplaying game.

== Contents ==
Spell Compendium is a compilation of previously published spells for third edition Dungeons & Dragons.

It compiles spells from a variety of other Dungeons & Dragons books and updates them to use the v3.5 version of the rules. Spell lists are included for all spellcasting classes in the Player's Handbook and Dungeon Master's Guide, along with a selection of cleric domains.

=== Sources ===
Sources used for the Spell Compendium include Draconomicon, Manual of the Planes, and Savage Species, along with numerous issues of Dragon and articles originally found on the Wizards of the Coast website.

== Publication history ==
The Spell Compendium was compiled by Matthew Sernett, Jeff Grubb, and Mike McArtor, and was published in December 2005. Cover art was by Victor Moray and Nyssa Baugher, with interior art by Steven Belledin, Mitch Cotie, Chris Dien, Wayne England, Jason Engle, Carl Frank, Brian Hagan, Fred Hooper, Ralph Horsley, Jeremy Jarvis, David Martin, Jim Nelson, William O'Connor, Lucio Parrillo, Michael Phillippi, Eric Polak, Wayne Reynolds, Ron Spears, Joel Thomas, and Franz Vohwinkel.

The Spell Compendium was reproduced as a premium reprint featuring new cover art and including game rules errata, released on April 16, 2013.
