= List of role-playing game artists =

This is a list of notable role-playing game artists, past and present. The people in this list created artwork for one or more notable, published role-playing game book, miniature, or other product.

== A ==
- Jason Banditt Adams - Desolation RPG by Greymalkin Designs, Mongoose Publishing's series such as Traveller, CONAN, Elric and others, as well as HERO Games titles
- Attila Adorjany - his work has appeared in comics, video games, film, TV, and roleplaying games including products by White Wolf, Wizards of the Coast, Fantasy Flight Games, and Steve Jackson Games
- Dave Allsop - his art appears in games for Wizards of the Coast and his own creation SLA Industries for Nightfall Games
- Glen Angus
- Samuel Araya - his published cover art includes Unknown Armies 2nd Ed. (Atlas Games), Weapons of the Gods (Eos Press), Tibet: The Roleplaying Game (Vajra Enterprises), along with various White Wolf / World of Darkness titles and All Flesh Must Be Eaten supplements

== B ==
- Arnal Ballester - main art designer in the Barcelona Joc Internacional publishing house; painted covers for LÍDER (Joc Internacional's magazine), game master's screens (RuneQuest); designed logos, including the LÍDER logo and the Spanish translation logo for Stormbringer
- Ghislain Barbe - several White Wolf products, including titles from the Exalted setting
- George Barr
- Thomas Baxa
- Denis Beauvais
- Carlo Bocchio (also known as Jackoilrain) - Dungeons & Dragons
- Tim Bradstreet - many early White Wolf projects, most notably Vampire: The Masquerade
- Brom - many TSR products (predominantly Dark Sun), Palladium Books covers, the inspiration for Deadlands
- Frank Brunner - illustrated different editions of Stormbringer
- Guy Burwell - GURPS Goblins
- Jeff Butler - Dungeons & Dragons and Marvel Super Heroes RPG

== C ==
- Clyde Caldwell
- Matt Cavotta
- Douglas Chaffee
- Javier Charro - illustrated for Mongoose Publishing, Fantasy Flight Games, Hero Games, Mythic Dreams
- Miguel Coimbra
- Jim Crabtree
- Dennis Cramer
- Carl Critchlow

== D ==
- Ned Dameron
- Liz Danforth - Tunnels and Trolls artist
- Stephen Daniele
- Darlene
- Gene Day - cover art of the first Call of Cthulhu edition (1981)
- Jeff Dee - many early TSR products, including Deities and Demigods
- Eric Deschamps
- Brian Despain
- Tony DiTerlizzi - many early TSR products including 2nd Edition Monster Manual and Planescape series
- Larry Dixon
- Vincent Dutrait - Dragon Magazine, Call of Cthulhu, The Dark Eye, Warhammer Fantasy Roleplay

== E ==
- Jeff Easley - many early TSR products including the Dragonlance series, and the cover to the second edition of the Player's Handbook
- Steve Ellis - many White Wolf products, most notably Werewolf: The Apocalypse; many Wizards of the Coast projects; Dungeons & Dragons, Magic: The Gathering and Kaijudo
- Larry Elmore - many early TSR products, including the Dragonlance series
- Wayne England
- Jason Engle
- Newton Ewell

== F ==
- Stephen Fabian
- Emily Fiegenschuh
- Fred Fields
- Scott Fischer
- Phil Foglio - GURPS IOU, S.P.A.N.C., the Xxxenophile card game
- Carl Frank
- Ken Frank
- Dan Frazier
- Frank Kelly Freas

== G ==
- Rafael Garres
- Donato Giancola
- Lars Grant-West
- Rebecca Guay

== H ==
- Brian Hagan
- Henry Higginbotham
- The Brothers Hildebrandt
- Jim Holloway
- Quinton Hoover
- Daniel Horne
- Ralph Horsley
- David Hudnut

== I ==
- Frazer Irving

== J ==
- Kennon James - published art includes work for Wizards of the Coast, Sabertooth Games
- Jennell Jaquays
- Jeremy Jarvis
- Andrew Johanson - Fantasy Flight Games
- Leif Jones - numerous illustrations for White Wolf's Vampire: The Masquerade, Werewolf: The Apocalypse, and Mage: The Ascension; Sword and Sorcery Studios, AEG, Necromancer Games, Holistic Design, Mythic Dreams
- Veronica V. Jones

== K ==
- Michael William Kaluta
- Dana Knutson
- Doug Kovacs
- Julian Kok

== L ==
- David S. LaForce
- John and Laura Lakey
- Hubert de Lartigue - illustrated covers, sourcebooks and supplements in the French gaming industry, such as the French translations of RuneQuest, Land of Ninja, and Stormbringer; some of his covers were used in publications in other languages, like his RuneQuest supplement cover Genertela, used in the United States and Spain
- Rob Lazzaretti
- April Lee - cover and interior art for a variety of titles including Legend of the Five Rings and 7th Sea (Alderac), In Nomine (Steve Jackson Games), and Kingdoms of Kalamar (Kenzer & Co.)
- Jody Lee - cover art for the third edition of RuneQuest (1984) and the first of Pendragon (1985)
- Vince Locke
- Todd Lockwood
- Eric Lofgren - credits include magazine articles, interior illustrations, and cover art including the cover art for Steve Jackson Games' GURPS Steam-Tech and Hero Games's Champions Viper
- Kevin Long - premier artist at Palladium Books from 1986 to 1995 whose work on Rifts and Robotech are foremost among his wide-ranging contributions to Palladium's earlier RPG series, which include Beyond the Supernatural, Heroes Unlimited, and Teenage Mutant Ninja Turtles
- Roger Loveless
- Howard Lyon

== M ==
- Diana Magnuson
- David L. Martin
- Max - pen name of Francesc Capdevila, who signed numerous covers and inner illustrations for LÍDER (Joc Internacional's magazine)
- Angus McBride - main illustrator of the MERP series of rulebooks, sourcebooks and supplements
- Raven Mimura
- Jeff Miracola
- Matthew Mitchell

== N ==
- Jim Nelson
- Mark Nelson
- Russ Nicholson
- Terese Nielsen - famous for her Magic: The Gathering card illustrations; did the cover artwork for the Dungeons & Dragons setting Jakandor in 1998 (Jakandor, Land of Legend and Jakandor, Isle of Destiny); in 1998 she illustrated the covers of three issues of Dragon and several Forgotten Realms novels; in 1999 she started illustrating covers for the 7th Sea role-playing game

== O ==
- William O'Connor
- Erik Jon Oredson - The DNDBBS project DNDBBS
- Erol Otus - many early TSR products including S3: Expedition to Barrier Peaks

== P ==
- Keith Parkinson
- Lucio Parrillo
- Jim Pavelec
- Darcy Perry - DuckQuest
- Michael Phillippi
- Eric Polak
- Alan Pollack
- Randy Post
- Steve Prescott
- Stephanie Pui-Mun Law
- Steve Purcell - several covers for the Different Worlds magazine and RuneQuest supplements

== R ==
- Vinod Rams
- Roger Raupp
- Adam Rex
- Wayne Reynolds
- David Roach
- Jennifer Rodgers - illustrations for publishers, including Blue Devil Games, Decipher Inc., Adept Press, and Anvilwerks
- Jim Roslof
- Luis Royo - painted some covers for Spanish role-playing games: first edition Fuerza Delta (1991) and second edition Far West (1994)
- Rafael Lange - Ordem Paranormal

== S ==
- Richard Sardinha
- Christopher Shy
- Kevin Siembieda - worked at Judges Guild illustrating adventure modules for Dungeons & Dragons, RuneQuest, and Traveller, 1979-1981); after founding Palladium Books, his art and cartography were featured in The Mechanoid Invasion, first edition Palladium Fantasy and Heroes Unlimited, and early Rifts titles
- Dan Smith - interior art for GURPS books
- Mark Smylie
- Brian Snoddy
- John T. Snyder
- Ron Spencer
- Anne Stokes
- David C. Sutherland III - early TSR products and book covers, A Paladin in Hell
- Arnie Swekel
- Tony Szczudlo

== T ==
- Jean Pierre Targete
- Ben Templesmith
- Miles Teves - Skyrealms of Jorune; later became a renowned Hollywood conceptual artist
- Joel Thomas
- David A. Trampier - TSR Hobbies Staff Illustrator; creator of Wormy, a comic strip that ran in The Dragon magazine; infamous for mysteriously vanishing for decades before resurfacing in a newspaper interview as a cab driver
- Timothy Truman - TSR Hobbies Staff Illustrator (early 1980s)
- Francis Tsai

== V ==
- Valerie Valusek
- Susan Van Camp
- Jon Van Caneghem - responsible for the Might and Magic series
- Franz Vohwinkel

== W ==
- Kev Walker
- Karl Waller
- Kevin Wasden
- Anthony S. Waters
- Tom Wham
- Michael Whelan - many TSR products including 2nd Edition Player's Handbook and Dungeon Master's Guide; his Elric illustration for the 1977 revised edition of the Stormbringer novel was used by Chaosium to illustrate the fourth edition (1990) of the Stormbringer role-playing game
- Chuck Whelon
- Eva Widermann
- Bill Willingham - many early golden age TSR products, notably the Basic and Advanced Dungeons & Dragons rulebooks; wrote and drew the Elementals comics; scripted the Fables comic series
- Robin Wood
- Sam Wood
- Ben Wootten

== Y ==
- Kieran Yanner - has been published by Decipher, Inc., Dream Pod 9, Eden Studios, Inc., Fantasy Flight Games, Necromancer Games, Steve Jackson Games, Sword and Sorcery Studios, Troll Lord Games and White Wolf
