= Dungeon Master's Guide II =

2005 role-playing game supplement

- Cover of Dungeon Master's Guide II
- Author: Jesse Decker, David Noonan, Chris Thomasson, James Jacobs, Robin D. Laws
- Genre: Role-playing game
- Publisher: Wizards of the Coast
- Publication date: June 2005
- Media type: Print (Hardcover)
- Pages: 288
- ISBN: 0-7869-3687-8
- OCLC: 61176331

The Dungeon Master's Guide II is a book of rules for the 3.5 edition of the Dungeons & Dragons seminal fantasy role-playing game.

== Contents ==
Like the Dungeon Master's Guide, this book focuses on providing Dungeon Masters with assistance in running the game. It provides advice on aspects of running the game as well as complex pregenerated characters (often using Prestige Classes).

=== Player types ===
The Dungeon Master's Guide II introduces Dungeon Masters to various types of people who enjoy the D&D game, and it explains what they enjoy.

Examples include:

- Brilliant planner—A leader-type who is happiest when planning for the night's adventure
- Cool guy—Player who likes to get cool powers and cool weapons
- Lurker—Someone who is happiest when left to his own devices
- Outlier—An oddball player who likes to see his character lose, seeing it as a victory more than a defeat
- Psychodramatist—A player who likes exploring the background of his or her character, and would love to have a session centered on that character

== Publication history ==
The book was written by Jesse Decker, David Noonan, Chris Thomasson, James Jacobs, and Robin D. Laws, and was published in June 2005. Cover art is by Matt Cavotta, with interior art by Kalman Andrasofszky, Mitch Cotie, Ed Cox, Steve Ellis, Wayne England, Emily Fiegenschuh, Randy Gallegos, Brian Hagan, Ginger Kubic, Raven Mimura, William O'Connor, Michael Phillippi, Vinod Rams, Wayne Reynolds, Dan Scott, Ron Spencer, Arnie Swekel, and Franz Vohwinkel.

David Noonan explained that this book offers words of wisdom on how to manage a game or even a whole campaign more creatively, and broadens the scope of adventuring to include more city and campaign-based material. He "wanted this book to have something for players too. Thus, the DMG II contains more magic items, plus some new rules elements designed for players, such as teamwork benefits and PC organizations".

Dungeon Master's Guide II was followed by the Player's Handbook II.

== Reception ==
The reviewer from Pyramid commented that: "The Dungeon Master's Guide II is a supplementary volume intended to make the referee's job easier, but it achieves only mixed results."
