= Magic Item Compendium =

2007 role-playing game supplement

- Author: Andy Collins with Eytan Bernstein, Frank Brunner, Owen K.C. Stephens, and John Snead
- Genre: Role-playing game
- Publisher: Wizards of the Coast
- Publication date: March 2007
- Media type: Print (hardback)
- Pages: 224
- ISBN: 978-0-7869-4345-6

The Magic Item Compendium is a sourcebook written for the 3.5 edition of the Dungeons & Dragons fantasy role-playing game.

== Contents ==
The Magic Item Compendium contains over a thousand magic items used in Dungeons & Dragons. The book contains new items as well as items previously appearing in 3rd edition books, including the Arms and Equipment Guide, Magic of Faerûn, and Complete Divine, updated as necessary for version 3.5.

The book classifies the items according to four broad categories: Armor (chapter one), Weapons (chapter two), Clothing (chapter three), and Tools (chapter four). Clothing refers to any non-armor item that occupies an equipment slot, including magical rings. Tools, including potions, scrolls, staves, and wands, are magical items that do not take up an equipment slot.

Chapter five details item sets, which are collections of items of the four major types that individually have magical powers but will exhibit stronger effects as more items in the set are collected by a player character.

Chapter six covers the use of magic items as well as their placement and creation. This chapter sets out specific rules on the use and creation of all magical items. Two appendices are included: one is a list of all the items in the Compendium and the Dungeon Masters Guide by price, and the other is a set of new randomized treasure tables.

Each individual item description details the item's price and item level, the equipment slot the item occupies, the caster level required to craft the item, the school of magic the item's effect falls under, the actual effect of the item, the type of player action used to activate the item, the item's weight, and any prerequisites and costs associated with the item's creation or use. A physical description of each item is also included.

== New material ==
Runestaffs are special staffs that allow a spellcaster to substitute an uncast spell slot of the appropriate level for a spell on their spell list in the staff. This can be done up to three times per day per spell, depending on the staff. Spontaneous casters can use runestaffs to expand their known spells, while casters who prepare spells can access their more esoteric spells (which they can substitute for more generic spells in their runestaffs).

Augment Crystals are small trinkets that are attached to a suit of armor, shield or weapon (depending on the crystal). In effect, weapons, armor and shields have an additional "item slot" of their own to allow players to customize their weapons for situational benefits without drastically adding to the cost of the item.

A revised magic item upgrade system is included, which separates miscellaneous powers (such as continuous and charge or per-day spell effects) from standard bonuses. These bonuses are now quickly added to any appropriate item without the "additional powers" multiplier. This has a number of benefits: first of all, players typically get magic items at a rather low level and then upgrade them with ability bonuses. Any item looted during later levels, even one that is highly desirable, is often discarded because it would be too expensive to reproduce the level-appropriate bonuses on their existing item. Second, it allows players to invest in interesting non-bonus items without losing the bonuses that CR-appropriate encounters assume the players have. Thirdly, it allows the magic items listed to have more variety and be available at lower levels; dungeon masters can apply upgrade costs quickly to allow an item to appear in higher-level treasure hoards.

Finally, the Magic Item Compendium offers an optional gear-selection system that is vastly simplified while remaining compatible with the existing system. This simplified system makes it easy for Dungeon Masters to quickly design non-player characters with level-appropriate gear and equipment, without the arithmetic required in D&D third edition.

== Publication history ==
The Magic Item Compendium was written by Andy Collins with Eytan Bernstein, Frank Brunner, Owen K.C. Stephens, and John Snead, and was released March 2007. Cover art was by Francis Tsai, with interior art by Steven Belledin, Ed Cox, Carl Critchlow, Eric Deschamps, Steve Ellis, Wayne England, Matt Faulkner, Emily Fiegenschuh, Randy Gallegos, David Griffith, Brian Hagan, Ralph Horsley, Heather Hudson, Doug Kovacs, Chuck Lukacs, David Martin, Mark Poole, Steve Prescott, Wayne Reynolds, Ron Spencer, Anne Stokes, Arnie Swekel, Steven Tappin, Joel Thomas, Beth Trott, Franz Vohwinkel, Eva Widermann, and James Zhang.

Collins, as the lead designer on the project, "started this process by identifying the 'big six' magic items that took up the majority of characters' item slots: magic weapons; magic armor & shields; rings of protection; cloaks of resistance; amulets of natural armor; and ability-score boosters". He "identified the reasons that these [magic] items were particularly well-loved: they were cost effective, they could be improved, there was nothing else as good in their slots, they were simple, they didn't take time to activate [and] they provided effects that were required for characters to stay competitive". With this in mind, the designers then pulled items from all the 3rd and 3.5 edition books and "after looking through about 2000 magic items, they looted the best 1000 or so".

The Magic Item Compendium also showed some early hallmarks of 4th edition design: items were marked levels and some items appeared at multiple strengths. It also introduced the idea of item sets, where items of a set would improve as more were collected, which would then reappear in the fourth-edition book Adventurer's Vault 2 (2009).

The Magic Item Compendium was reproduced as a premium reprint, featuring new cover art and including game rules errata, on July 16, 2013.

== Reception ==
The reviewer from Pyramid commented that: "If you are the type of gamer who likes to trick-out your character with the best equipment, or the type of GM who likes to give your players lots of quests items and reward the PC's efforts with goodies and gear then you will likely find this book both interesting and useful. The designers of this book have pulled together a vast number of items and introduced new rules to make implementing magic items more systematic, and made it perhaps more fun for players who may have learned their first fantasy gaming from computer rather than table-top experiences."

Tim Janson from mania.com wrote: "It felt like the good, old days again just browsing through page after page of this treasure trove. The art is fantastic as usual. One of the best Supplements to come out in a long time."

DieHard GameFan said that "what I took away from the Magic Item Compendium is that it is for gamers that want to roll-play instead of role-play. It's for munchkin min/maxing gamers who would rather spend more time looking up precisely how and what to roll (and when) rather than trying to tell a fun story with friends. That's not necessarily a bad thing, but it's not the type of gaming *I* enjoy, so I can't think of when I would ever need to use the Magic Item Compendium, and more importantly, when I would ever want to."
