= Draconomicon =

Dungeons & Dragons sourcebook

- Authors: Nigel Findley, Christopher Kubasik, Carl Sargent, John Terra, and William Tracy
- Genre: Role-playing game
- Publisher: TSR
- Publication date: 1990
- Media type: Print

The Draconomicon is the title for several optional sourcebooks for the Dungeons & Dragons role-playing game, providing supplementary game mechanics for dragons specifically. Different Draconomicon books have been issued for the 2nd, 3rd, and 4th editions of the Dungeons & Dragons game. The Latin-inspired name of the books loosely translates as "Book of Dragon Names".

== 2nd Edition ==
The Draconomicon, the first book for Dungeons & Dragons by this title, was designed by Nigel Findley for the 2nd edition of Advanced Dungeons & Dragons, with four adventures designed by Christopher Kubasik, Carl Sargent, John Terra, and William Tracy. It was released in 1990 as a Forgotten Realms sourcebook. The book features cover art by Jeff Easley (uncredited), and interior illustrations by Brom, David Dorman, Keith Parkinson, Terry Dykstra, Fred Fields, Robin Raab, Valerie Valusek, and Karl Waller.

Shannon Appelcline commented that of the changes to the Forgotten Realms publications in the early 1990s, "The biggest change was that the geographical setting books had faded away starting in the early '90s. They were replaced by a number of other lines. The "FOR" books instead looked at organization in the Realms—much like the splatbooks of White Wolf and others. They ran from FOR1: Draconomicon (1990) to Giantcraft (1995)."

The book includes new dragons, among them steel, mercury, and yellow dragons. It contains general reference information about dragons, geography in the Forgotten Realms relating to dragons, dragon psychology, advice on role-playing dragons, along with new dragon species, a "hall of fame" of important dragons, new magic for dragons, a "hunter's guide", and four short adventures featuring dragons. Unusually, these adventures did not simply focus on "killing the dragon" but instead explored alternate aspects of conflict resolution in line with the draconic lore of the Realms.

The book was released again in September 1999 by Wizards of the Coast with new cover artwork. Both editions of the book contain the same information but a Wizards of the Coast logo is included in latter.

== 3rd Edition ==
Draconomicon (The Book of Dragons)
- Authors: Andy Collins, Skip Williams, James Wyatt
- Genre: Role-playing game
- Publisher: Wizards of the Coast
- Publication date: November 2003
- Media type: Print (Hardcover)
- Pages: 288
- ISBN: 0-7869-2884-0
- OCLC: 53447707
- LC Class: GV1469.62.D84 D836 2000

The 3rd edition version of the Draconomicon, named Draconomicon (The Book of Dragons) specifically, contains information about dragon physiology and psychology, along with new dragon-only feats, spells, and prestige classes. There are also additional rules regarding aerial combat and breath weapons. Players can find new feats, spells, magic items, and prestige classes for use against dragons in this book. There are various types of new dragons and dragon-related creatures, along with sample statistics blocks for dragons of all the chromatic and metallic varieties of all ages.

The Draconomicon for 3rd edition D&D was designed by Andy Collins, Skip Williams, and James Wyatt, and published in November 2003. Cover art was by Todd Lockwood, with interior art by Wayne England, Emily Fiegenschuh, Lars Grant-West, Rebecca Guay-Mitchell, David Hudnut, Jeremy Jarvis, Ginger Kubic, John and Laura Lakey, Todd Lockwood, David Martin, Dennis Crabapple-McClain, Matt Mitchell, Mark Nelson, Steve Prescott, Vinod Rams, Richard Sardinha, Ron Spencer, Stephen Tappin, Joel Thomas, Ben Thompson, and Sam Wood.

Andy Collins talks about the beginnings of the idea for this book: "I remember talking about this project as early as 2001 or so, during our regular "What are we going to write next?" meetings. At one point, it was tentatively slated as a full-blown coffee table book with only minimal game material. We eventually realized that that wasn't our strong point, but the notion that this book should be art-intensive stuck around."

== 4th Edition ==
In 4th edition D&D, the Draconomicon is the name of a two books covering dragons.

The first book is Draconomicon: Chromatic Dragons, released in November 2008. Written by Bruce R. Cordell, Logan Bonner, Ari Marmell, and Robert J. Schwalb, it is a 288-page hardcover that contains various information, including sample treasure hoards and monsters, including three types of true dragons new to 4th edition: brown, gray and purple dragons, known as desert, fang and deep dragons in earlier editions. Cover art was by Todd Lockwood, with interior art by Devon Caddy-Lee, Miguel Coimbra, Eric Deschamps, Vincent Dutrait, Emily Fiegenschuh, Tomás Giorello, Lars Grant-West, Warren Mahy, Lee Moyer, Andrew Murray, Steve Prescott, Vinod Rams, Tara Rueping, Rick Sardinha, Ron Spears, Ron Spencer, Joel Thomas, Francis Tsai, Franz Vohwinkel, Eva Widermann, Sam Wood, and James Zhang.

The second book, Draconomicon: Metallic Dragons, was written by Bruce R. Cordell and Ari Marmell and was released in November 2009. It introduced the new cobalt, mercury, mithral, orium, and steel dragons. The front cover illustration is by Todd Lockwood and the back cover illustration is by Chippy, with interior illustrations by Dave Allsop, Kerem Beyit, Zoltan Boros and Gabor Szikszai, Chippy, Wayne England, Jason A. Engle, Tomás Giorello, Lars Grant-West, Ralph Horsley, Howard Lyon, William O'Connor, Chris Seaman, and Franz Vohwinkel.

== Other uses ==
Draconomicon was also the name of a 1997 expansion pack for the Spellfire collectible card game. It was released shortly before the buyout of TSR, Inc. by Wizards of the Coast.

== Reception ==
John Setzer reviewed the original Draconomicon in the February 1992 issue of White Wolf Magazine. He stated that "all in all, this book is a must if you play in the Forgotten Realms", noting that it would be useful for any Advanced Dungeons & Dragons player and worth a look for anyone who likes dragons. Overall, he rated it a 4 out of a possible 5.

Rick Swan reviewed the original Draconomicon for Dragon magazine #180 (April 1992). He calls the book an "entertaining collection of draconic odds and ends". According to Swan, "The fanciful essays discussing behavior and customs [...] makes for a delightful read, while the Spelljammer material clears up a few questions about dragons in space. Less successful are the adventures, four rather routine excursions that feature promising plots but suffer from a lack of development; one or two longer adventures would have been preferable to four short ones."

The reviewer from Pyramid commented on the third edition Draconomicon: "Rather than see the dragon as the huge pile of hit points standing between you and a big pile of treasure, the writers try to flesh out these magnificent beasts. The book treats them as characters first and foremost, participants in the story, and in fact there are guidelines for using them as PCs, NPCs, forces of nature, or just the stuff of legend that dominates an area's history. They can be friend or foe, mentors, or part of the party."

Viktor Coble listed Draconomicon as #4 on CBR's 2021 "D&D: 10 Best Supplemental Handbooks" list, stating that "It's such a fun read that it feels less like a part of a game and more like a fantasy novel. What's the most fun is how there are tables for the language of dragons, giving an even deeper layer to one of the game's namesakes."

== Reviews ==
- Casus Belli #84 (Dec 1994)
- Coleção Dragon Slayer
- Coleção Dragão Brasil
- Backstab #49
- Realms of Fantasy
