= Libris Mortis =

Role-playing game supplement

Libris Mortis: The Book of Undead
- Cover of Libris Mortis
- Author: Andy Collins; Bruce Cordell
- Illustrator: Numerous
- Cover artist: Tom Kidd
- Language: English
- Subject: Dungeons & Dragons supplement on undead
- Genre: Rules supplement
- Publisher: Wizards of the Coast
- Publication date: October 2004
- Publication place: United States
- Media type: Hardback
- Pages: 182
- ISBN: 978-0-7869-3433-1

Libris Mortis: The Book of Undead is a book which is an official supplement for the 3.5 edition of the Dungeons & Dragons role-playing game. The book covers the fictional undead within the D&D universe and comprises seven chapters, introducing new content for Dungeon Masters and players, as well as providing general information about undead.

It was received positively by reviewers, with praise for its material for Dungeon Masters and its illustrations, but received criticism for its weak player-oriented content. The book was the second in the series of books about specific monster types, the first being Draconomicon. Similar books published since include Lords of Madness. Libris Mortis included content from older books, such as Tome and Blood and the Book of Vile Darkness, that had been reworked.

== Inspiration and production ==
Libris Mortis was written to present "a comprehensive overview of the undead" within the Dungeons & Dragons universe, offering new game rules and content, for both players and Dungeon Masters. The book is in the same format as the earlier published Draconomicon, which instead focused on Dragons, and was described as "a super-sized monster ecology" by the Nuketown podcast. Similar books that have since been released include Fiendish Codex I: Hordes of the Abyss, Fiendish Codex II: Tyrants of the Nine Hells and Lords of Madness.

Inspiration for the book's content came from numerous sources. In an interview posted on the Wizards of the Coast website, Collins said that inspiration came from Buffy the Vampire Slayer, Angel, various Dracula films, along with films The Mummy and The Mummy Returns. Cordell said that pop culture has "less impact on [his] conceptualizations of the undead", but he did mention The Evil Dead, 28 Days Later and the novel Salem's Lot. According to Collins, he and Cordell worked equally on the book, with Collins focusing more on material relating to character building, sample undead and running undead, while Cordell dealt with monster design and undead material, but he said that they "dabbled in each others'" sections quite a bit as well". He also mentioned a monster template designed by Matt Sernett that was originally written for the Monster Manual III and had been included in Libris Mortis.

== Origin of the name ==
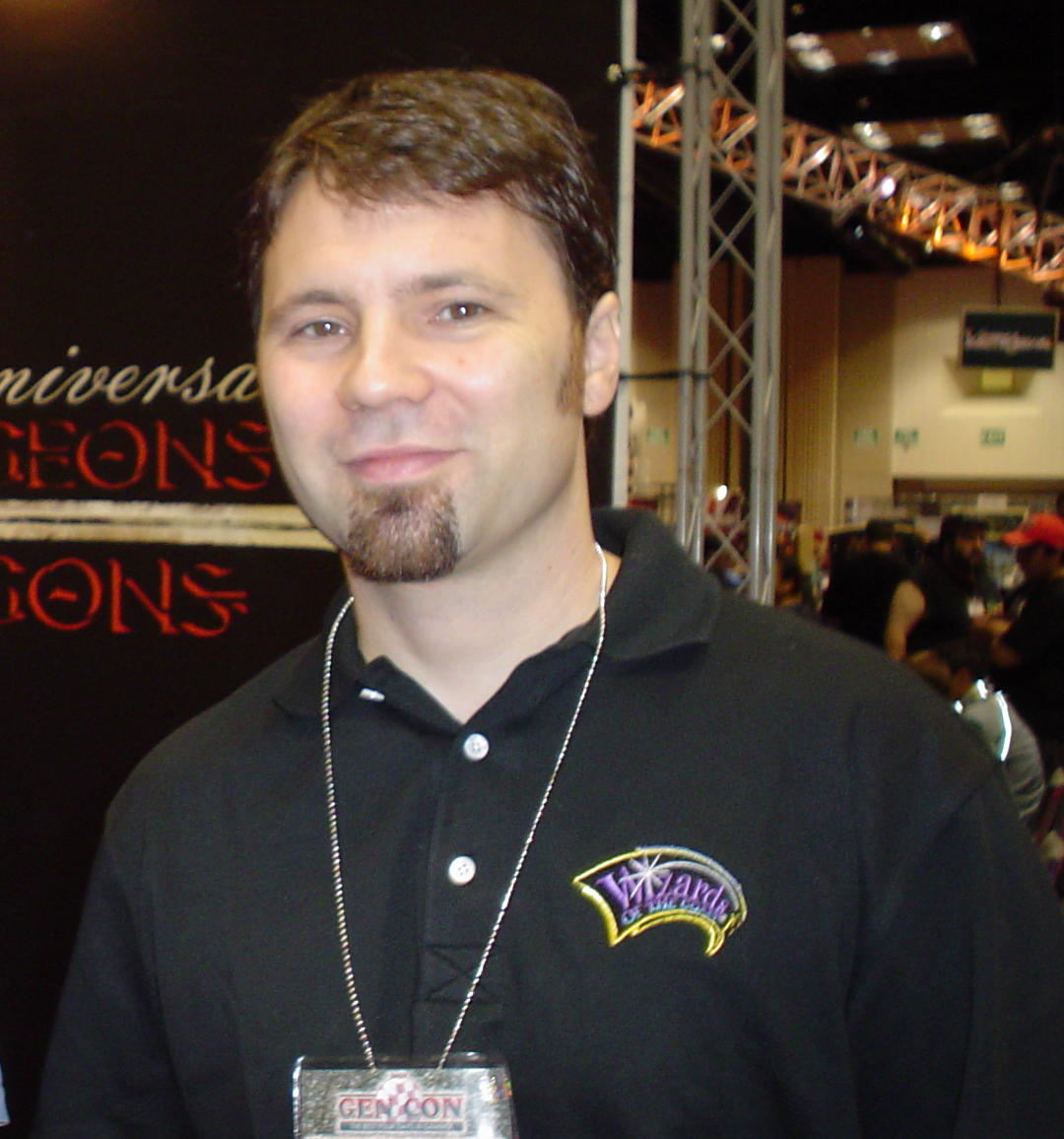
The book was designed by Bruce Cordell (pictured in 2004) and Andy Collins.

Libris Mortis was named after a book from within the Dungeons & Dragons universe written by an aasimar cleric of Pelor named Acrinus in a dialect of the Celestial language of good outsiders. The title of the fictional book probably translates into English as From the Books of Death, though the dialect is no longer used.

The title Libris Mortis' was intended to be interpreted as Latin, in which From the Books of Death would translate as (Ex) Libris Mortis. On the subject of name, Collins was quoted as saying "I don't have any insight on the naming process that produced Libris Mortis. I don't know Latin and wasn't involved in selecting that name. Regardless, I think what's in the book is far more important that what name is attached to it."

== Content ==
Libris Mortis has seven chapters and an introduction. The chapters are named "All About Undead", "Character Options", "Prestige Classes", "Spells", "Equipment", "New Monsters" and "Campaigns".

=== "All About Undead" ===
The first chapter, "All About Undead", contains general information about undead monsters. The chapter discusses the ecology of undead creatures, though this section was described as "very small", and talks about undead religion, introducing new deities. The chapter also discusses "stranger areas", including the idea of undead citizenship in cosmopolitan cities. Variant rules are introduced for areas including hauntings and exorcisms, which were received positively, and for undead hunger and appetites. The section also includes advice on how to combat undead, but according to Casey Smith of D20 Magazine Rack, "veteran players probably won't get much out of this part of the book". Overall, the section was described by one reviewer as "one of the more interesting".

=== "Character Options" ===
The second chapter, "Character Options", lists 59 feats, discusses undead characters in the party, and offers rules for undead monster classes. Many of the feats are geared towards spellcasters, with few martial feats, a single Bardic feat and no feats geared specifically towards Druids or Barbarians. Different types of feats include the Corpsecrafter tree, for spellcasters to improve their undead, monstrous feats to modify the special abilities of undead creatures, and tomb-tainted feats, allowing living characters to gain undead traits. Smith commended feats that Dungeon Masters may use, such as Spell Drain, Lifesense and Necrotic Reserves, but said that "feats that players might use aren't nearly as interesting". The discussion of and rules for undead characters was said to be the "weakest section of the book". Five alternate base classes were introduced in the Savage Species "monsters as classes" format. These are classes for the Ghoul/Ghast, Mohrg, Mummy, Vampire Spawn and Wight.

=== "Prestige Classes" ===
Chapter three, "Prestige Classes", introduces eleven new prestige classes.

- Death's Chosen, for mortals with undead masters.
- The Dirgesinger is a Bard-specific class, and a "personal favourite" of Smith.
- Master of Radiance is a Druid specific class for fighting undead,
- Master of the Shrouds can summon incorporeal undead. 3.5 edition versions of the Pale Master and the True Necromancer (originally from Tome and Blood) can also be found.

The chapter has four prestige classes specifically for undead:

- Ephemeral Exemplar is a class for incorporeal undead
- The Lurking Terror is a stealthy undead class
- The Master Vampire strengthens the abilities already possessed by a vampire
- The Tomb Warden is a prestige class designed for undead who guard tombs.

Kenneth Newquist, of Nuketown, said that the undead prestige classes "are excellent for turning traditional undead threats into something exceptional", and said that his "only complaint with these prestige classes is that there aren't enough of them".

=== "Spells" ===
Chapter four, "Spells", introduces 57 new spells. The spells mostly focus around the school of Necromancy, with many domain spells for the new deities introduced in the first chapter. Spells commented on by reviewers included Consumptive Field, Awaken Undead, Wither Limb, Avasculate, Necrotic Cyst (and related spells, including Necrotic Domination and Necrotic Bloat), along with spells aimed at players, such as Spawn Screen and Mass Death Ward, described as "more pragmatic than exciting". Some of the spells included in the chapter were version 3.5 reworks of spells found in the Book of Vile Darkness.

=== "Equipment" ===
Chapter five, "Equipment", contains sections on special items and alchemical substances, "positoxins", magic items and undead grafts. Positoxins, poisons that affect undead, were poorly received by reviewers, with the Nuketown podcast asking "we have plenty of folklore remedies for combating undead, why not create magical versions of those?" Magic items included profane weapons, sacred weapons, ectoplasmic armor and specific items including the Ghoul Globe and Unholy Shroud. This section was also criticized by the Nuketown podcast, which said that the "Magic item section is only six pages; I'd like to have seen more magic items, particularly more unique ones alone with a few lesser artifacts". The grafts section worked on rules introduced in the Book of Vile Darkness and the Fiend Folio, adding new undead "grafts", but did not include rules for creating your own.

=== "New Monsters" ===
Chapter six, "New Monsters", introduces 47 new monsters, the weakest of which is the Carcass Eater and the strongest of which is the Dream Vestige. Newquist praised ooze like Blood Animote, while the Nuketown podcast commended the Swarm templates. Smith praised the Brain in a Jar, swarm-shifter templates, Necropolitan, Revived Fossil and Skulking Cyst, but called the Hulking Corpse and Murk "surprisingly benign". Mike MacKenzie, of RPGnet, called the Skin Kite and Angel of Decay "ghastly", the Revived Fossil and Necropolitan "less interesting" and the Half Vampire an "extraordinarily bad idea".

=== "Campaigns" ===
The seventh and final chapter, "Campaigns", includes tips on how to use undead in campaigns and adventures, as well as how to control specific undead monsters. It also has adventure sites and back-stories for various cults. The chapter was well received, being called the "best section of the book" and being "better than I [the reviewer] expected". The maps were commended by some, being called "useful right out of the box" but Mike MacKenzie, of RPGnet, said they were "basically a Book of Lairs for undead. Nothing terribly remarkable here." The section includes statistics and back-stories for alternatives classic undead monsters, including ten different ghosts, six liches, 19 skeletons, ten vampires, and fifteen zombies.

== Illustrations ==
The Angel of Decay, by Jeremy Jarvis.

The Libris Mortis art staff comprises Dawn Murin as art director, Dee Barnett, Dawn Murin and Trich Yochum as graphic designers. The graphic production specialist was Angelika Lokotz, with Candice Baker as image technician. Cartography was provided by Dennis Kauth, with the cover designed by Tom Kidd. Interior illustrations were provided by Thomas Baxa, Steve Belledin, Jeff Easley, Steve Ellis, Wayne England, Emmanuelle Hunter, Jeremy Jarvis, Chuck Lukacs (who provided the images for the start of each chapter), David Martin, Michael Phillippi, Steve Prescott, Wayne Reynolds and Brian Snoddy. The artwork was praised by Mike MacKenzie of RPGnet, who said that "the art is good. Its re-assuring to see the quality we expect from WotC in this department." He criticized the "unintentionally goofy" images of the Mohrg Barbarian and Wight archer, but commended the "sepia-tinged" work of Wayne England as fitting the book's mood. The work by Chuck Lukacs was also praised, as were the images by Jeremy Jarvis. Jarvis' Angel of Decay and Atropal Scion were said to be "just as creepy as we would expect".

== Reception ==
Libris Mortis was generally received positively by reviewers. Mike MacKenzie, of RPGnet, gave the book a 5/5 for style and a 4/5 for substance, with the summary comment: "As a DM, I personally think this is a great (creepy) book, especially the first and last chapters, and there is some good crunch to be found." Casey Smith, of D20 Magazine Rack, gave the book 80% "reviewer opinion", averaging with other scores to give an overall grade of 82%. Kenneth Newquist, of Nuketown, gave Libris Mortis a rating of 9/10, with the comment "Libris Mortis isn't an essential source book, but it is a useful one." The Nuketown podcast gave the book 8/10, saying it was "good, but not essential. Worth picking up for anyone for whom the undead play a major role in their campaign." Vincent Venturella, of Flames Rising Dot Com, gave the book 3/5 for style, 5/5 for substance and 4/5 overall.

The reviewer from Pyramid commented: "There's a little more campaign advice here than in previous Wizards of the Coast products, though not a whole lot. You get a short introduction to what undead are and how they unlive, eat (eww), and procreate. Theories on whence they come, examples of cities and religions for the cosmopolitan zombie, and advice on strategy when facing (or being) the dead (especially the self-aware threats) make good reading, but these are sadly brief."

== Reviews ==
- Backstab #51
- Coleção Dragon Slayer
