= Races of the Dragon =

2006 role-playing game supplement

- cover of Races of the Dragon
- Authors: Gwendolyn F.M. Kestrel, Jennifer Clarke Wilkes, and Kolja Raven Liquette
- Genre: Role-playing game
- Publisher: Wizards of the Coast
- Publication date: January 2006
- Media type: Print (Hardback)
- Pages: 160
- ISBN: 0-7869-3913-3
- OCLC: 63671067
- LC Class: GV1469.62.D84 D836 2000

Races of the Dragon is an optional supplemental source book for the 3.5 edition of the Dungeons & Dragons fantasy role-playing game.

== Contents ==
This book contains info on two new races. This book offers a new race that works well with the Dungeons & Dragons sorcerers, a class that uses magical power derived from having dragon blood. The book also contains new prestige classes, feats, and spells.

== Publication history ==
Races of the Dragon was written by Gwendolyn F.M. Kestrel, Jennifer Clarke Wilkes, and Kolja Raven Liquette, and was published in January 2006. Cover art was by Steve Prescott, with interior art by Steven Belledin, Ed Cox, Daarken, Wayne England, Emily Fiegenschuh, Carl Frank, Dan Frazier, Brian Hagan, Ralph Horsley, Chris Malidore, Jim Nelson, and Eric Polak.

Gwendolyn Kestrel explains the inspiration for the book's material: "Dragons are a rich part of the Dungeons & Dragons game history. There's plenty of material in the game system to serve as inspiration. Of course, we wanted to go beyond what we had done before. While familiar with both Savage Species and Unearthed Arcana, I didn't directly go to these books for inspiration for Race of the Dragon."

== Reviews ==
- Coleção Dragon Slayer
