= Heroes of Battle =

2005 fantasy role-playing game supplement

- Cover art by David Hudnut
- Author: David Noonan, Will McDermott and Stephen Schubert
- Genre: Role-playing game
- Published: May 2005 (Wizards of the Coast)
- Media type: Print (Hardback)
- Pages: 160
- ISBN: 0-7869-3686-X
- OCLC: 60682805
- LC Class: GV1469.62.D84 D836 2000

Heroes of Battle is a hardcover supplement published by Wizards of the Coast (WotC) in 2005 for the 3.5 edition of the Dungeons & Dragons role-playing game that describes how to involve player characters in large-scale battles.

== Contents ==
Heroes of Battle is intended for use by a Dungeon Master who wants to make a large-scale, epic battle the setting of an encounter, scenario, or campaign. While the battle is the setting, the player characters do not act as generals, but rather, they find adventures and encounters within the battle itself.

The first chapter, "The War Campaign", explains how to center an entire campaign around a single conflict. It also covers the role of player characters in this conflict, and the specifics of military organizations.

The second chapter, "Building Adventures", follows up on the first chapter in more detail, discussing the battlefield, the construction of the adventure, the details of a fantasy army, encounters on a battlefield, and considerations of terrain. Summoned creatures, magical dangers and encounters with undead are also covered.

The third chapter, "Battlefield Encounters", presents eight examples of encounters that may occur in the middle of a battle, including prisoner exchanges, attacks on supply rains or supply depots, assaults on artillery outposts, and assaults against defensive positions on high ground. It also discusses how to calculate the rewarding of experience points.

The fourth chapter, "Rules of War", introduces new rules specific to the battlefield, including siege engines, missile volleys, morale, and leadership command. There are also new rules concerning victory points that can measure the impact of the player characters during the battle; and recognition points, which allow the gamemaster to recognize the merits of individual accomplishments.

The fifth chapter, "The Military Character", presents new feats and skills, as well as new prestige classes.

== Publication history ==
Dungeons & Dragons has traditionally focussed on the individual accomplishments of player characters, who normally only engage in personal combat. In 1985, TSR, the original publishers of D&D, released Battlesystem, a set of rules for mass combat where players commanded armies of soldiers. In 1989, a new edition of Battlesystem was developed for the second edition of D&D. In 2005, David Noonan started to develop a new set of battlefield rules for D&D 3.5, but this time involving the player characters as heroes of the battlefield rather than as generals. Will McDermott and Stephen Schubert joined the project as writers, and as the creative process was winding down, Andy Collins led a six-week project development phase. The resultant 160-page hardcover book, with cover art by David Hudnut, and interior art by Wayne England, Doug Kovacs, Chuck Lukacs, Roberto Marchesi, Mark Nelson, Eric Polak, Wayne Reynolds, and Franz Vohwinkel, was released by WotC, now the publishers of D&D, in May 2005.

== Reception ==
The reviewer from Pyramid commented that "Heroes of Battle not only provides both the mechanics and the RPG feel the story demands, but weaves them together into a beautiful tapestry."

In Issue 8 of the Brazilian role-playing magazine Coleção Dragon Slayer, Rogério Saladino found this book was not all what he expected, writing, "I thought I would find rules to simulate combat with armies, control troops and give players the command of entire regiments. But Heroes of Battle is nothing like that. It aims to use the atmosphere of war as a backdrop, making this conflict setting replace the concept of a dungeon. In other words, the game is exactly the same as basic D&D, but instead of walking through underground labyrinths, the heroes travel around a battlefield completing missions." Saladino liked the "well-made drawings and concise text" but concluded on a warning note: "If you are looking for a book that will help you introduce the atmosphere of war into your campaign, Heroes of Battle is a good option. But, if you are eager to assemble large armies with special troops and put them into battle, look for other sources. This is perhaps the book's biggest flaw."
