= Sandstorm (Dungeons & Dragons) =

Dungeons & Dragons rulebook

- cover of Sandstorm
- Author: Bruce R. Cordell, Jennifer Clarke-Wilkes, and JD Wiker
- Genre: Role-playing game
- Publisher: Wizards of the Coast
- Publication date: March 2005
- Media type: Print (Hardback)
- Pages: 224
- ISBN: 0-7869-3655-X
- OCLC: 58722791
- LC Class: GV1469.62.D84 D836 2000

Sandstorm is an optional supplemental source book for the 3.5 edition of the Dungeons & Dragons roleplaying game.

== Contents ==
Sandstorm describes how Dungeon Masters can create adventures and even campaigns set in a desert or wasteland environment. The book details many hazards that are associated with real-life dangers to desert travelers. Furthermore, Sandstorm corrects many false ideas about deserts, such as the belief that quicksands are commonly found in the desert; the book explains that quicksands require water to form, and are usually found near an oasis, although quicksands are still rare even there. The book gives ideas for DMs as well as players in using new prestige classes and new races. In addition, book references several 3rd edition books, such as Deities and Demigods. At the beginning of the book, examples of wasteland areas found in the campaign settings of Greyhawk and the Forgotten Realms are given.

=== Chapter summary ===
1. The Waste: This describes the terrain and perils of the waste.
2. Races, Classes, and Feats: This adds the Asherati and Bhuka races, special rules for core classes, and new waste-based feats.
3. Prestige Classes: This introduces six new prestige classes, including the ashworm dragoon, the lord of tides, and the scorpion heritor.
4. Equipment: This details weapons, gears, and alchemical items common to desert explorers.
5. Magic: This introduces the concept of drift magic, new spells and new magic items.
6. Monsters of the Waste: This describes several new monsters native to the waste.
7. Adventure Sites: This describes some locales suitable for a waste campaign.

== Publication history ==
Sandstorm was written by Bruce R. Cordell, Jennifer Clarke Wilkes, and JD Wiker, and was published in March 2005. Cover art was by Ben Thompson, with interior art by Steven Belledin, Matt Cavotta, Mitch Cotie, Ed Cox, Wayne England, David Hudnut, Dana Knutson, Doug Kovacs, Todd Lockwood, Chuck Lukacs, Jim Nelson, William O'Connor, Michael Phillippi, Steve Prescott, Wayne Reynolds, Ron Spencer, and Stephen Tappin.

== Reviews ==
- Black Gate #9 (Fall 2005)
- Coleção Dragon Slayer
