= Tome of Magic =

1991 role-playing game handbook

- Authors: David Cook, Nigel Findley, Anthony Herring, Christopher Kubasik, Carl Sargent, and Rick Swan
- Genre: Role-playing game
- Publisher: TSR
- Publication date: 1991
- Media type: Print (Hardback)

Tome of Magic (abbreviated ToM) is a handbook of rules and guidelines for the Dungeons & Dragons role-playing game. As its name implies, it is a supplement to be used to expand the magical options available in the game. It was first released for Advanced Dungeons & Dragons, 2nd Edition, and the name was reused for a book released for the 3rd Edition of D&D.

== 2nd Edition ==
The 2nd Edition Tome of Magic, published in 1991, was a book focused upon expanded options for members of the mage and cleric classes and their subclasses. It also introduced the concept of metamagic effects to D&D. The book was arranged in several sections, designed by David Cook, Nigel Findley, Anthony Herring, Christopher Kubasik, Carl Sargent, and Rick Swan. Cover art is by Jeff Easley, with interior illustrations by Stephen Fabian, Brom, Clyde Caldwell, Carol Heyer, John and Laura Lakey, and Roger Loveless.

This AD&D game hardcover includes 86 new wizard spells (plus rules for "wild mages"), 170 priest spells (plus eight new spheres), and 92 new magical items, all meant to fill minor gaps in the extant spell lists.

The first section presented new subclasses for the mage class, and new forms of spells and spellcasting for the cleric class, as well as several new spheres of divine magic. The mage subclasses were the wild mage and elementalist classes. The wild mage had the most in the way of new rules, including wild magic and wild surges, which result from his attempts to use magic in raw, barely controllable forms. Elementalists had to devote themselves to one of the four classical elements, barring them from using spells employing their oppositional element (fire vs. water, or air vs. earth, for example), but gaining increased power in exchange.

The cleric class gained access to quest spells, spells of such immense power that a cleric must be granted such a spell directly by his or her god. These spells require the cleric to go upon a quest to gain the right to cast it once, or petition their god to grant the spell to deal with an immediate crisis. Such spells might be used to end a famine or cure a plague, or to wound or slay large groups of enemies. Several of these spells became 9th-level spells in the 3rd Edition of the game. Clerics also gained the ability to draw upon power generated by the faith and devotion of many to produce permanent spell effects at holy sites, to cast spells cooperatively with other priests, and several new spheres of magic (similar to the "schools" that wizards in D&D study).

The second section of the book presented many new spells for both clerics and wizards. Some of these spells were carried forward into 3rd Edition within the core rules, such as Abi-Dalzim's horrid wilting (with name changed to simply horrid wilting) and wail of the banshee. This is also the section that introduced metamagic effects, as spells that enhanced and augmented any spells cast while they were still in effect. In 3rd Edition, metamagic returned in the core rules through feats that enhanced spells cast using the feats.

The third and final section of the book was devoted to various new magic items, including several items that carried curses. These new items included the standard array of potions, rings, wands, worn items, and magic tools, but also introduced "aromatic oils," magic potions applied like perfume to produce their effect.

=== Reception ===
Allen Varney briefly reviewed the original Tome of Magic for Dragon magazine No. 172 (August 1991). Varney surmised that spellcasters would focus on "heavy artillery" spells, but cautioned that the wise DM "should prefer the many spells that don't cause damage but instead enable good stories" such as the many communication spells that allow characters to convey information more easily and those that provide story hooks. He also mentioned a couple of instances of "quantum physics applied to magic in spells". Varney concluded by saying: "This product needs its hardcover package; you'll use it a lot." Keith Eisenbeis reviewed the product in the February 1992 issue of White Wolf. He rated it at 4 of 5 points, calling it "a must for players of both 1st and 2nd editions".

In 2013, Alex Lucard, for Diehard GameFAN, wrote that "for those who don't want to be held down by the limited selection of magical offerings in the Player's Handbook, here is all you need. [...] There's something for every Second Edition Mage, Priest and Druid in this book! There are some truly fun magical items to be had in this book as well. Tenser's Portmanteau of Frugality is hilariously weird. The portable canoe is amazingly useful. The Staff of the Elements is simply awesome. Quite simply, The Tome of Magic is one of those big books from Second Edition I'm shocked hasn't appeared on DNDclassics.com due to how popular it was back in the day and how useful it is".

== 3rd Edition ==
Tome of Magic
- Authors: Matthew Sernett, Ari Marmell, David Noonan, and Robert J. Schwalb
- Genre: Role-playing game
- Publisher: Wizards of the Coast
- Publication date: March 2006
- Media type: Print (Hardback)
- Pages: 288
- ISBN: 978-0-7869-3909-1

The title was reused for a 3.5 (Revised) Edition supplement published in March 2006. This book was designed by Matthew Sernett, Ari Marmell, David Noonan, and Robert J. Schwalb. Cover art is by Todd Lockwood, and interior art is by Ed Cox, Carl Critchlow, Daarken, Wayne England, Carl Frank, Brian Hagan, Michael Komarck, Howard Lyon, Chris Malidore, Raven Mimura, Lucio Parrillo, Michael Phillippi, Eric Polak, Steve Prescott, Scott Roller, Joel Thomas, Francis Tsai, Franz Vohwinkel, and James Zhang.

The third edition Tome of Magic is devoted to new forms and styles of magic as a path to power. These new paths are embodied in three new alternate base classes.

The book is arranged into three sections, one for each of the new character classes and their unique take on magic.

- Binder - Allows the souls of vestiges, beings so strange or powerful that they have been exiled from existence as it is normally understood, to share his body and thus gains power. This class can serve radically different roles from day to day, some of whose strongest suits include close-ranged damage, healing outside of battle, and personal protection and survival. The spirits may impose for a price for their power: significant and often very strange temporary changes to the character's appearance and behavior (though not so much that the character is in danger of alignment shift).
- Shadowcaster - Manipulates shadow plane energy to create a variety of effects. Some of Shadow Magic stronger suits include single-target damage (and to a lesser extent, area damage), espionage and divination, and reacting to or influencing the magic of others.
- Truenamer - Caster that utilizes the power of truenames to create a variety of effects. Mechanically, Trunamers are very much a "support"-oriented class whose strong suits include healing and protection, weapon and armor augmentation, and battlefield harassment.

Each chapter includes several feats, prestige classes, magic items and monsters associated with that style of magic.

Matthew Sernett explained the inspiration for the creation of the book: "The concept for the book started with the idea of doing something about "advanced magic." We wanted to show people something new, and take magic to a different place for the game. We struck upon the individual themes for the three types of magic (pact magic, shadow magic, and truename magic) as the most interesting among several areas of magic that D&D hasn't explored very well up to this point."

== Reviews ==
- Casus Belli #65
- Dragon Slayer
- Coleção Dragão Brasil
