= Magic of Incarnum =

2005 book by James Wyatt

- Author: James Wyatt, Frank Brunner, Stephen Schubert
- Genre: Role-playing game
- Publisher: Wizards of the Coast
- Publication date: September 2005
- Media type: Print (Hardback)
- Pages: 224
- ISBN: 0-7869-3701-7
- OCLC: 62188715
- LC Class: GV1469.62.D84 D836 2000

Magic of Incarnum is a supplemental book for the 3.5 edition of the Dungeons & Dragons role-playing game. It was first printed in 2005 to be applied to 3.5 D&D rules.

== Contents ==
It introduces new classes (Incarnate, Soulborn, and Totemist) and new races (Azurin, Duskling, Rilkan, and Skarn), along with new feats, rules, and spells, for both classes within the book and classes from other books.

Magic of Incarnum describes Incarnum, which, in its pure form, looks like a "radiant mist, deep blue in color." With the supplemental rules provided within, characters can use incarnum to create Soulmelds using Essentia. The Soulmelds function like magically-sustained items that are applied to different parts of the body, and Essentia is invested into said Soulmelds to make them more effective. In addition to investing Essentia, characters can bind Soulmelds to different Chakras, which further fuses Soulmelds to their corresponding body parts, providing characters with bonus effects.

== Publication history ==
The book was written by James Wyatt, Frank Brunner, Richard Baker, and Stephen Schubert, and first published in September 2005. Cover art was by Henry Higginbotham with cover photography by N. Eric Heath, and interior art by Wayne England, Carl Frank, David Griffith, Eric Polak, Mark Poole, Wayne Reynolds, Ron Spencer, Anne Stokes, Chris Trevas, and Franz Vohwinkel.

James Wyatt explains: "Here's my story about the birth of the Magic of Incarnum book. I've always been really excited about the entire 3E product line, but while it has brought forth tremendous innovations in mechanical concepts, it hasn't expanded the world of D&D in a really significant way. The Expanded Psionics Handbook is the latest and greatest incarnation of the psionics rules, but the base concept has been part of the game since Eldritch Wizardry. I really wanted to see us push the boundaries and come up with a completely new concept. So in meeting after meeting over a period of about two years, I stressed the need to do something that had never been seen in D&D before."
