= Lords of Madness =

Dungeons & Dragons rulebook

- Cover art by Wayne England and Ed Cox
- Author: Rich Baker, James Jacobs, and Steve Winter
- Publisher: Wizards of the Coast
- Publication date: May 2005
- Pages: 224
- ISBN: 978-0786936571

Lords of Madness: The Book of Aberrations is an official supplement for the 3.5 edition of the Dungeons & Dragons fantasy role-playing game published by Wizards of the Coast (WotC) in 2005 that details "aberrations" — creatures said to have evolved from wild magic or distant dimensions.

== Contents ==
The book includes new aberration monsters and monsters related to them. It explores what an aberration is, and describes various classes of aberrations. In addition to providing more details and updates of already published monsters from the Monster Manual such as the gas spore, this book provides thirty pages of new monsters.

It also provides information for player characters, including new feats, magic, spells, magic items, prestige classes, and equipment used by those that hunt aberrations.

== Publication history ==
Lords of Madness was written by Rich Baker, James Jacobs, and Steve Winter. Baker explained how they chose the creatures that would be highlighted, saying, "The best master aberrations we identified were the aboleths, beholders, and mind flayers. They're highly intelligent, they enslave other monsters, and they're particularly inimical to human life and society. Beyond those three major races, we found a couple of others that shared some similar characteristics but were not as iconic to the game -- the neogi and the grell. Finally, we created a new aberration just for this book, the tsochari. As the lead designer, I divvied up the book into assignments for Steve and James. Steve got mind flayers and neogi, James got beholders and aboleths. I took the grell and the new race, the tsochari. A fair amount of that decision-making was driven by the physics of carving up a book for three designers to work on, but I did decide to hog the new race for myself. I wanted to take a shot at 'em."

WotC published the book in May 2005 with cover art by Wayne England and Ed Cox and interior art by Steve Belledin, Mitch Cotie, Ed Cox, Dennis Crabapple McClain, Steve Ellis, Wayne England, Colin Fix, Dana Knutson, Doug Kovacs, Chuck Lukacs, Jim Nelson, Michael Phillippi, Wayne Reynolds, Richard Sardinha, Dan Scott, and Ron Spencer.

WotC also published several other books in this series about specific monster types including the Draconomicon and Libris Mortis.

== Reception ==
In Issue 4 of the Brazilian RPG magazine Dragon Slayer, Rogério Saladino liked the illustrations, saying, "The visual quality is on par with other WotC books, featuring excellent illustrations and an impeccable finish." Saladino also liked the balance between the descriptive content and the game statistics, and felt the book's greatest strength "lies in emphasizing the truly bizarre nature of these aberrations, even drawing parallels to Lovecraftian-style horror and exploring how to incorporate such themes into a campaign." Saladino concluded, "It's always refreshing to see new blood—even if it happens to be the players' characters' blood—breathed into classic monsters."

The Brazilian RPG magazine Dragão Brasil noted "This excellent D&D supplement offers a comprehensive look at some of the most bizarre creatures to ever invade the world of fantasy gaming ... all ready to strike fear into any hero.

The website Exposition Break found the book a disappointment, noting that it does not resolve the many conflicting origin stories for these creatures that had been developed from previous editions of D&D. "Instead of seeming like the all-encompassing companion to more encyclopedic works like The Draconomicon, Lords of Madness's write-ups felt like shortened, crib notes version of these many weird creatures. Not only had several of them received more detail before, but what was here simplified the aberrations it covered and with this flattened them and made them less interesting." The review concluded, "As with other third edition books it feels a bit afraid of saying anything definite in fear of ruining someone’s homebrew campaign", and suggested that readers skip this book.
