= Heroes of Horror =

Tabletop role-playing game supplement

- Author: James Wyatt, Ari Marmell, and C.A. Suleiman
- Language: English
- Genre: Role-playing game
- Published: October 2005 (Wizards of the Coast)
- Publication place: United States
- Media type: Print
- Pages: 160
- ISBN: 0-7869-3699-1
- OCLC: 62300105
- LC Class: GV1469.62.D84 D836 2000

Heroes of Horror is a hardcover supplement to the 3.5 edition of the Dungeons & Dragons role-playing game.

== Contents ==
It is intended for use by Dungeon Masters who want to incorporate elements of horror into their game. It contains ideas for pacing and other elements of horror drama into the game, new rules for horror themed games (including the third iteration of the taint mechanic), as well as horror themed base classes, feats, prestige classes and NPCs (non-player characters).

== Publication history ==
Heroes of Horror was written by James Wyatt, Ari Marmell, and C.A. Suleiman, and published in October 2005. Cover art was by David Hudnut, with interior art by Daarken, Wayne England, Randy Gallegos, Des Hanley, Michael Phillippi, Eric Polak, Steve Prescott, Wayne Reynolds, and Dan Scott.

James Wyatt explained what influenced him in writing the book: "Though I've been a big Ravenloft (and Masque of the Red Death) fan, I tried very hard to steer this book in a different direction. Of course, every horror movie I've ever seen had its influence on the book, but the short stories of Clark Ashton Smith probably had the greatest influence on the way I defined the genre for the purpose of Heroes of Horror."
