= Races of the Wild =

Tabletop role-playing game supplement

- Cover of Races of the Wild
- Author: Skip Williams
- Genre: Role-playing game
- Publisher: Wizards of the Coast
- Publication date: February 2005
- Media type: Print (Hardback)
- Pages: 192
- ISBN: 0-7869-3438-7
- OCLC: 57682150

Races of the Wild is an optional supplemental source book for the 3.5 edition of the Dungeons & Dragons roleplaying game.

== Contents ==
Races of the Wild contains background information on the elves and halflings, introduces a race of winged humanoids called "raptorans," as well as giving rules for playing wilderness based creatures such centaurs and the newly created fey-race killoren as player characters.

== Publication history ==
Races of the Wild was written by Skip Williams and published in February 2005. Cover art was by Adam Rex, with interior art by Tom Baxa, Steve Belledin, Dennis Crabapple McClain, Wayne England, Matt Faulkner, Emily Fiegenschuh, Jeremy Jarvis, Chuck Lukacs, Larry MacDougal, Vinod Rams, Sam Wood, and James Zhang.

"One new twist on elves is self-sufficiency and nonspecialization," Skip Williams explained. "The long elven lifespan gives them plenty of time for learning to do things for themselves. Halflings lead something of a double life. Their wandering lifestyle obliges them to seem open and welcome to strangers, but they have secrets they keep to themselves."

=== Reprints and revisions ===
Races of Stone, Races of Destiny and Races of the Wild in the Dungeons & Dragons Races Gift Set, released in 2005.
