= Stormwrack =

2005 Dungeons & Dragons sourcebook

- cover of Stormwrack
- Author: Baker, Richard, Carriker, Joseph D., Clarke-Wilkes, Jennifer
- Genre: Role-playing game
- Publisher: Wizards of the Coast
- Publication date: August 2005
- Media type: Print (Hardback)
- Pages: 224
- ISBN: 0-7869-3689-4
- OCLC: 61343685
- LC Class: GV1469.62.D84 D836 2000

Stormwrack is a supplemental source-book for the 3.5 edition of the Dungeons & Dragons fantasy role-playing game.

== Contents ==
The book has detailed information and descriptions on various types of both realistic and fantastical watery environments, including underwater, the open ocean, ships, coral reefs, grottos, swamps and such. Watery hazards such as waves, storms, exposure, rain and the like are deeply explored.

Several new sea-affiliated races, the darfellan, the aventi are introduced. Old races, such as the hadozee (a yazarian-like race from the Spelljammer setting) and Sea elves are detailed for use as player characters.

There are new prestige classes, new magic items, new spells, new monsters, and various other rules additions. Finally, a few pre-made adventures are included at the end, set in aquatic/coastal environments, for players to test the new content on.

== Publication history ==
Stormwrack was written by Richard Baker, Joseph D. Carriker Jr., and Jennifer Clarke Wilkes, and published in 2005. Cover art was by Jeremy Jarvis, with interior art by Chris Appel, Drew Baker, Wayne England, David Griffith, Fred Hooper, Lee Moyer, Jim Nelson, Michael Phillippi, Eric Polak, Joel Thomas, Franz Vohwinkel, and Sam Wood.

It is one in a series of five source-books for the game which deal with particular environments, as to give adventures set in such environments more depth. Sandstorm and Frostburn dealt with desert/waste and arctic environments, Cityscape and Dungeonscape dealt with city/dungeon environments, while Stormwrack deals with ocean/sea/water/aquatic environments.

Stephen Schubert explains what weaponry pirates might outfit their ships with: "Piracy on the high seas is more a way of life than a choice of explosives. Stormwrack does not describe massive cannons and twenty-four-gun ships, but a number of ships in its pages could be outfitted with bombards -- an early form of cannon. Still other ships might be equipped with catapults, ballistae, or even the flame-throwing firespout."

== Reviews ==
- Coleção Dragon Slayer
