= Player's Handbook II =

Book by David Noonan

- The cover of the 3.5 edition Player's Handbook II is reminiscent of the cover of the Players Handbook from the first edition
- Author: David Noonan
- Genre: Role-playing game
- Publisher: Wizards of the Coast
- Publication date: May 2006
- Media type: Print (Hardback)
- Pages: 224
- ISBN: 0-7869-3918-4

Player's Handbook II is the title of a third edition Dungeons & Dragons supplement. It is a handbook of rules and guidelines for the Dungeons & Dragons role-playing game. As the name implies, the book is a supplement to the edition's Player's Handbook. It introduces supplemental rules, new spells and new classes.

== Contents ==
Player's Handbook II contains four new classes, along with new spells, feats, and new role-playing options.

Chapter two introduces four new base classes:

- Beguiler – A rogue-like spell-caster who specializes in illusions and enchantments.
- Dragon Shaman – A relatively well-rounded character who gains spell-like abilities similar to a dragon.
- Duskblade – An elven-based hybrid of the fighter and wizard, although it is available to any race.
- Knight – Lawful fighters who use bard-like charisma to draw threatening opponents away from party members and onto himself, like the tank in many MMORPGs

In addition to these new classes, many rules are included for existing character classes. These include expanded rules and options for many classes, new feats, more spells, and different roleplaying options for characters. Other sections contain information about the adventuring group, teamwork benefits, and affiliations. Finally, the last chapter contains information about modifying an existing character.

== Publication history ==
May 2006 saw the release of the Player's Handbook II, designed to follow up the standard Player's Handbook. This book was designed by David Noonan. Cover art is by Dan Scott, with interior art by Steve Belledin, Steve Ellis, Emily Fiegenschuh, Carl Frank, Ralph Horsley, David Hudnut, Michael Komarck, Howard Lyon, Mike May, Jim Nelson, Lucio Parillo, Eric Polak, Steve Prescott, Mike Schley, Ron Spencer, Franz Vohwinkel, and Eva Widermann. Its cover pays homage to the AD&D 1st edition Player's Handbook.

== Reception ==
The reviewer from Pyramid felt that the publication of this book suggests that players "can use quite a bit" of information for playing D&D.
