= Killoren =

Killoren may refer to:

== People ==
- Kelly Bensimon (born 1968), American real estate agent and television personality, née Killoren

== In fiction ==
- Killoren (Dungeons & Dragons), a fictional creature
