= Tome of Battle: The Book of Nine Swords =

2006 tabletop role-playing game supplement

- Author: Richard Baker, Matt Sernett, Frank Brunner
- Genre: Role-playing game
- Publisher: Wizards of the Coast
- Publication date: August 2006
- Media type: Print (Hardback)
- Pages: 160
- ISBN: 978-0-7869-3922-0
- OCLC: 70896662
- LC Class: GV1469.62.D84 D836 2000

Tome of Battle: The Book of Nine Swords is an official supplement for the 3.5 edition of the Dungeons & Dragons role-playing game, published by Wizards of the Coast in 2006. The book chronicles the rise and fall of the fictional Temple of Nine Swords within the D&D universe and introduces an entirely new "initiator" subsystem that gives greater flexibility.

== Overview ==
Tome of Battle was written to give players a chance to play characters "[blending] the genres of Far East action games and the 'typical' D&D game world," in contrast to the standard "knights and castles and dragons" that most of Dungeons and Dragons 3.5e was focused on. The book notes the success and acceptance of Eastern fantasy in the west - characterized by the acceptance of games like Final Fantasy and movies like Kill Bill - and attempts to capture this by incorporating elements of martial arts into a D&D campaign. The book summarized this concept as: "Tome of Battle isn't your parents' D&D - it's bigger, bolder, and more fantastic than ever before."

Mechanically, the purpose of the book is to increase the viability of melee combatants in the game to be comparable to magic user characters in high-level play. The book accomplishes this via three revised melee classes, each equipped with versatile combat maneuvers and stances that can be expended in the same way that magic users expend spells.

== Contents ==
Tome of Battle has eight chapters and an introduction. The chapters are named "Disciples of the Sword", "Skills & Feats", "Blade Magic", "Maneuvers & Stances", "Prestige Classes", "The Nine Swords", "Magic Items", and "Monsters".

=== Martial Adepts ===
Martial Adepts are the base classes introduced in Tome of Battle. Two of the three classes parallel existing classes, but gain different class features, as well as access to the powerful techniques of the Sublime Way: Crusader, which parallels the religious strictures of the Paladin (but unlike the Paladin, the Crusader class can be used to make a character of any alignment), and Warblade, which parallels the pure martial prowess of the Fighter. The third, the Swordsage, is most like a Monk in nature, but has more customizable features. Swordsages are best compared to the philosopher-swordsmen of the Wuxia film genre.

=== Temple of the Nine Swords ===
In the internal mythology of the book, the nine styles were once the properties of different races and wildly divergent philosophies. They were brought together in the person of a man named Reshar, who studied and mastered all nine styles in the astonishingly short period of just three years. After that, he built a temple, which brought all of the styles together under a single roof. This temple survived until after Reshar vanished without a trace, leaving each style an exemplar sword. After that, the masters of the Tiger Claw and Shadow Hand styles plotted against the others, and were cast out. The cast-out masters wandered, gathering pupils, before they returned and slaughtered the original temple, scattering the styles once again to the winds. Yet the scattered disciples of the Nine Schools remembered their period of lost unity, and strive continuously both to pass their arts on to new generations, and to restore the lost glory of the Temple.

=== Maneuvers and Stances ===
The martial arts system presented in the book bears a passing resemblance to the magic system of D&D. Martial arts maneuvers are readied (instead of being memorized); unlike spells in the magic system, only one maneuver can be readied at a time. Once maneuvers are expended, each class has a method of recovering them. Classes which are not martial adept classes can only recover maneuvers (which have been learned through the Martial Study feat) at the end of an encounter.

Maneuvers differ from magic spells in that they renew much more quickly (at the end of a fight or by performing some action to restore them), and can be "unlearned" in order to learn new maneuvers at a later level. Although maneuvers have levels, they ignore the "spells by level" mechanic familiar to spellcasters, and any maneuver known can be used as long as it is available, regardless of how many maneuvers of the same level were used previously.

=== Styles or Schools of the Sublime Way ===
The nine schools presented in the book each take a different philosophy of martial action, and enhance the warrior in different ways. Each school has a range of maneuvers and stances from first to ninth level, like magic spells, as well as a Legendary weapon whose powers mirror the style it represents.

- Desert Wind: A flowing style, Desert Wind adepts do battle with swift movement and swirling, flaming strikes. Its exemplar weapon is a scimitar, also named Desert Wind. This sword was owned by a wealthy emir who wasted his entire fortune on the blade.
- Devoted Spirit: A tough style, Devoted Spirit adepts battle their enemies based on their alignment. Its exemplar weapon is a falchion, named Faithful Avenger. This sword has passed between good and evil hands, doing great deeds for either.
- Diamond Mind: An insightful style, Diamond Mind adepts anticipate their enemies' actions before they happen. Its exemplar weapon is a rapier, named Supernal Clarity. The theft of this blade by a rakshasa prince called Kaziir Thet led to the downfall of the Temple of the Nine Swords.
- Iron Heart: Iron Heart adepts glory in skill above all else. Its style concentrates on balance and footwork. Its exemplar weapon is a bastard sword named Kamate. This blade was forged by hobgoblins and is fabled as the first sword to be made.
- Setting Sun: The "Judo" style of the nine schools, Setting Sun adepts prefer to turn their enemies' strength against them. Its exemplar weapon is a mithral short sword named Eventide's Edge. This sword's powers were discovered by a child defending himself against a clan of giants on a deserted island.
- Shadow Hand: One of the two "traitor" schools, the Shadow Hand masters a long time ago assaulted and destroyed the original fighting monastery. Its discipline teaches stealth, deception and ambush, and is effective even if somewhat tainted. Its exemplar weapon is a dagger named Umbral Awn. Many previous owners of this blade died trying to find the true source of the Shadow Hand's power.
- Stone Dragon: This style depends on toughness over all and its abilities can only be used if standing on the ground. Its exemplar weapon is a greatsword named Unfettered. This blade was crafted by an enslaved dwarf and goliath as an act of defiance. The dwarf was killed, but the goliath used the blade to escape. Years later, the goliath awarded the blade to Reshar.
- Tiger Claw: All-out bestial attack is the trademark of this school, the second "traitor" school. Its exemplar weapon is a kukri named Tiger Fang. This blade was passed down by a dying warrior to his son, who wished to prove himself and honor his father. The local rajah would not let him be in the army, but the young warrior attempted to prove himself, at the disdain of the rajah. Finally, the young warrior died saving the rajah from a sorcerer who had summoned demons, bringing honor to his father's name.
- White Raven: The "leader" style, White Raven's abilities are less about enhancing oneself and more about one's cohorts. Its exemplar weapon is an adamantine longsword named Blade of the Last Citadel. This weapon's history is split into three legends describing how the blade was used to defend those who could not defend themselves.

Without expending a feat, the Desert Wind, Setting Sun and Shadow Hand schools are exclusive to Swordsage characters, Iron Heart to Warblades and Devoted Spirit to Crusaders. Diamond Mind and Tiger Claw are Swordsage/Warblade schools, while White Raven is Crusader/Warblade. Only Stone Dragon is available to all three Martial Adept classes.

=== Prestige Classes ===
Tome of Battle adds eight martial adept prestige classes, in the same expanded format as the base classes earlier in the book, and rules for using other prestige classes with the martial adept base classes. Martial adepts continue to advance in their martial skills while multiclassing (either with other base classes or with prestige classes), but more slowly, except when multiclassing with other martial adept classes.

=== Martial Monsters ===
The last section of the book is devoted to monsters one might find and ally with or fight in a martial-centered campaign. It covers four creatures that can be allies or enemies to students of the Sublime Way, including a rakshasa variant; the Reth Dekala, remnants of a once-proud warrior race turned into restless spirits; and the valkyrie.

== Publication history ==
The Tome of Battle was written by Richard Baker, Matthew Sernett, and Frank Brunner, and was published in August 2006. Cover art was by Eric Polak, with interior art by Kalman Andrasofszky, Steve Ellis, Wayne England, Emily Fiegenschuh, Howard Lyon, Jeff Nentrup, Torstein Nordstrand, Michael Phillippi, Arnie Swekel, and Beth Trott.

Shannon Appelcline commented that Tome of Battle was the first of two third edition books derived directly from the development of Dungeons & Dragons fourth edition, as between design phases "Mike Mearls spliced the encounter-power mechanics of 4e into this book, then into process. As such, it offers a fascinating view of fourth edition in mid-design. Though the fighters of Nine Swords have encounter powers much like they would in the next edition, their abilities had unique recharge requirements, allowing them to refill in the middle of an encounter if certain conditions were met. Before the release of 4e, Heinsoo would decide this detail was too complex and remove it."

== Reviews ==
- Coleção Dragon Slayer

== Legacy ==
A system similar to martial maneuvers is used for force powers in the Star Wars Roleplaying Game Saga Edition.

Elements of the Tome of Battle were incorporated into the 4th edition of Dungeons and Dragons; specifically the combat maneuvers. In addition, spellcasters get an upgrade in this regard too, gaining at will, encounter and daily spells that they can utilize so that a spellcaster will never be forced to pick up a weapon because he ran out of spells.
