= Races of Destiny =

2004 role-playing game supplement

- Cover of Races of Destiny
- Authors: David Noonan, Eric Cagle, and Aaron Rosenberg
- Genre: Role-playing game
- Publisher: Wizards of the Coast
- Publication date: December 2004
- Media type: Print (Hardcover)
- Pages: 192
- ISBN: 0-7869-3653-3
- OCLC: 57457064
- LC Class: GV1469.62.D84 D836 2000

Races of Destiny is a supplement for the 3.5 edition of the Dungeons & Dragons roleplaying game.

== Contents ==
This book deals with races that live primarily in urban settings, specifically humans, half-orcs, and a new race called the Illumian, whose most notable features are the sigils that constantly orbit their heads. This book is centered on races, their human blood and the effects of this.

Many of the resources in Races of Destiny deal specifically with urban settings and nearly all have racial requirements.

== Publication history ==
Races of Destiny was written by David Noonan, Eric Cagle, and Aaron Rosenberg, and was published in December 2004. Cover art was by Adam Rex, with interior art by Ed Cox, Wayne England, David Hudnut, Chuck Lukacs, Jeff Miracola, Monte Moore, Jim Nelson, Michael Phillippi, Eric Polak, Richard Sardinha, and Ron Spencer.

Dave Noonan explains how the designers approached the subject matter in initial discussions and design: "A lot of our early discussions included the question, '. . . and then what?' In other words, it's one thing to notice that humans tend to be more broadly multicultural than elves or dwarves. But when you look at how broad that canvas of culture is in the real world, it's simply staggering. So then what? What does that incredible cultural diversity lead you to? In the case of the humans, one possible answer is that human cultures are effectively each a race in their own right, as different from one another (in everything but physiology) as elves are from dwarves."

=== Reprints and revisions ===
Races of Stone, Races of Destiny and Races of the Wild in the Dungeons & Dragons Races Gift Set, released in 2005.
