= Chuck Lukacs =

American artist

- Known for: Fantasy art

Chuck Lukacs is an artist whose work has appeared in role-playing games.

== Career ==
His first published Dungeons & Dragons work was in Dragon magazine while Paizo was its publisher. His Dungeons & Dragons work includes interior art for Expanded Psionics Handbook (2004), Races of Stone (2004), Libris Mortis (2004), Races of Destiny (2004), Complete Adventurer (2005), Sandstorm (2005), Lords of Madness (2005), Heroes of Battle (2005), and Magic Item Compendium (2007). He contributed artwork to the Curse of Strahd Revamped.

He is known for his work on the Magic: The Gathering collectible card game. His first work was on the Lorwyn block.

Lukacs has also taught character design at the Pacific Northwest College of Art.
