= Eric Polak =

Artist

- Known for: Fantasy art

Eric Polak is an artist whose work has appeared in role-playing games.

== Career ==
His Dungeons & Dragons work includes the cover art for Tome of Battle (2006), Dragon Magic (2006), and Complete Champion (2007), and interior art for Races of Destiny (2004), Heroes of Battle (2005), Stormwrack (2005), Magic of Incarnum (2005), Heroes of Horror (2005), Spell Compendium (2005), Races of the Dragon (2006), Red Hand of Doom (2006), Tome of Magic (2006), Player's Handbook II (2006), Complete Mage (2006), and Rules Compendium (2007).

He is known for his work on the Magic: The Gathering collectible card game.

Polak has done work on books for other role-playing games, including Deadlands and Brave New World (Pinnacle Entertainment Group), Legend of the Five Rings and 7th Sea (Alderac Entertainment Group) and EverQuest (Sword & Sorcery Studios).
