= David Hudnut =

American artist

- Known for: Fantasy art

David Hudnut is an artist whose work has appeared in role-playing games.

== Career ==
David Hudnut worked on Dungeons & Dragons including the cover art for Heroes of Battle (2005), Heroes of Horror (2005), and the adventures Red Hand of Doom (2006), and Expedition to the Demonweb Pits (2007), and interior art for Draconomicon (2003), Unearthed Arcana (2004), Planar Handbook (2004), Frostburn (2004), Races of Destiny (2004), Complete Adventurer (2005), Sandstorm (2005), Player's Handbook II (2006), Monster Manual IV (2006), and Rules Compendium (2007). He also did the cover art for the Dragonlance novel The Alien Sea (2006), as well as the video game The Lord of the Rings: Aragorn's Quest (2010).

He is also known for his work on the Magic: The Gathering collectible card game.
