= Javier Charro =

Spanish artist

Javier Charro, b. 1980 in Leon, Spain and raised in Gran Canaria is a Spanish illustrator and book designer in the field of fantasy literature whose works have been used on book covers, collectible card games, and as illustrations in a variety of role-playing games. He developed illustrations for various RPG Publishers such as Mongoose Publishing, Moon Design Publications, Hero Games, Fantasy Flight Games, Mythic Dreams Studios and many others.

He has also made cover illustrations for Spanish publisher Mundos Epicos Grupo Editorial for novels as "Los Héroes Malditos", "Las tierras de Meed", "La Flor de Jade" and "El Triángulo Vikingo"
