= Andy Collins (game designer) =

Role-playing game designer

- Occupation: Author
- Writing career
- Subject: Role-playing games
- Notable work: Dungeons & Dragons 4th edition
- Website: www.andycollins.net

Andy Collins is a game designer whose writing credits include numerous books for the Dungeons & Dragons fantasy role-playing game.

== Early life and education ==
Andy Collins grew up in Olympia, Washington. His uncle gave him a copy of the original Dungeons & Dragons boxed set for his tenth birthday; although he did not know any other D&D players at the time, and found it hard to figure out how to play a game with no board or playing pieces, he said "my brother, a friend, and I sat down to play one day. Nine hours later, we'd missed both lunch and dinner, and we were all hooked." He was also a fan of the Star Wars franchise, having seen the original film several times while it was in the theater. Collins continued gaming throughout high school and college, and graduated from Stanford University in 1994 with a degree in English.

== Career ==
Collins began working at Wizards of the Coast in April 1996, and after working for a time for Wizards' Organized Play division, he moved to the R&D division and worked as both an editor and designer. His first project was a new science-fiction game line, Alternity, for which he worked on a number of products, notably the Dark•Matter campaign setting. After Wizards cancelled the Alternity game, Collins was one of the people working on Wizards of the Coast's new Star Wars Roleplaying Game. While working on that game, Collins commented "It's been interesting working with Bill [Slavicsek]. I know all the movies, and I've read several of the books, but he pretty much knows everything about Star Wars – all the books, all the movies, all the comics, all the source material. Everything." As a long-time gamer and Star Wars fan working on a Star Wars RPG, Collins summed up his feelings: "I could paraphrase Lou Gehrig. 'I consider myself the luckiest man on the face of the Earth to be working in this industry with as many great people as I have around me.' I sometimes still have to pinch myself when I'm walking down the hall."

Andy Collins was also the author of the Sage Advice column in Dragon, and later Sage Advice Online at Wizards of the Coast's website. Collins was a part of the revision team for Dungeons & Dragons version 3.5. Early in 2005, Bill Slavicsek organized a team to do some early designs for a fourth edition of D&D, which was led by Rob Heinsoo and included Collins and James Wyatt; Heinsoo, Collins, and Wyatt became the core team for fourth-edition D&D. Collins, Mike Mearls, David Noonan, and Jesse Decker were part of Heinsoo's "Flywheel" design team for fourth edition Dungeons & Dragons, and did the final concept work from May 2006 to September 2006, before the first books for the edition were written and playtested. Collins was one of the authors of the Dungeons & Dragons 4th edition Player's Handbook.

== Bibliography ==
=== Dungeons & Dragons ===
==== 3rd edition ====
- Complete Warrior
- Draconomicon
- Epic Level Handbook
- Libris Mortis: The Book of Undead
- Magic Item Compendium
- Unearthed Arcana

==== 4th edition ====
- Player's Handbook

=== Gamma World ===
- Gamma World Campaign Setting

=== Star Wars Roleplaying Game ===
- Star Wars Roleplaying Game Revised Edition
- Star Wars Gamemaster Screen
- Living Force Campaign Guide
