= Jason Engle =

American artist

Jason A. Engle
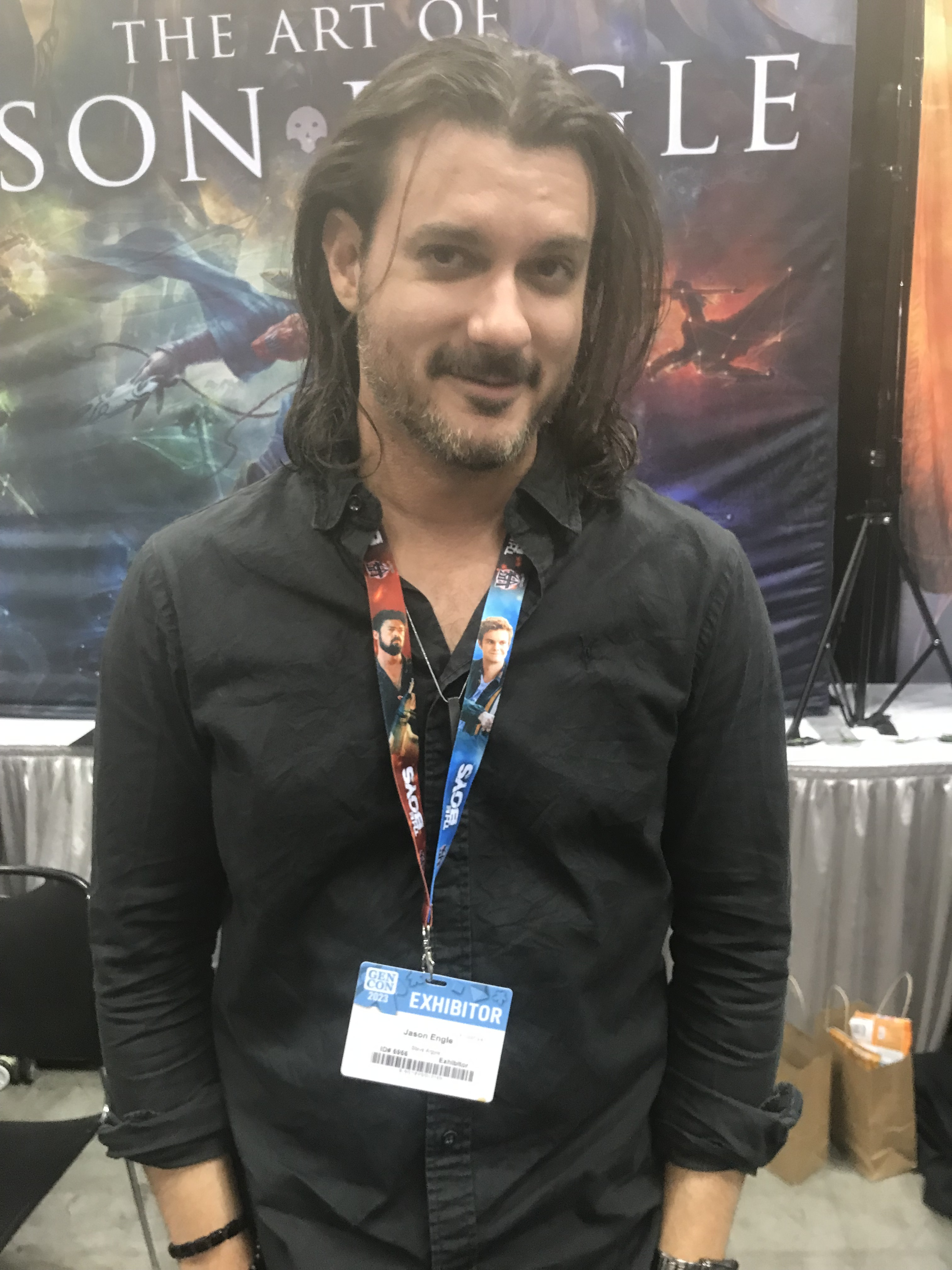
- Jason Engle
- Known for: Fantasy art

Jason A. Engle is an American artist, whose work has appeared in role-playing games and collectible card games.

== Early life ==
Jason Engle was born in southern California in 1979.

== Career ==
His Dungeons & Dragons work includes Shining South (2004), Lost Empires of Faerûn (2005), Champions of Ruin (2005), Champions of Valor (2005), Spell Compendium (2005), Rules Compendium (2007), and the 4th edition Dungeon Master's Guide (2008), Monster Manual (2008), Manual of the Planes (2008), Martial Power (2008), Player's Handbook 3 (2010), and Tomb of Horrors (2010).

He is known for his work on the Magic: The Gathering collectible card game.
