= Vincent Dutrait =

French illustrator

Vincent Dutrait (born 1976) is a French illustrator.

== Early life and education ==
Dutrait was born in 1976, in Provence. He studied at the École Émile-Cohl, graduating in 1997, where he taught since 1999 with the exception of the period from 2003 to 2008 when he lived with his wife in the north of Seoul, South Korea from 2003 to 2008.

== Career ==
Best known for his prolific work in the role playing game and board game industries, he has also produced a large number of illustrations, artbooks and comics for both European and Asian clients.

== Awards and reception ==
Vincent Dutrait's artwork was praised by various reviewers.

The artwork of the game Unconscious Mind by Dutrait together with Andrews Bosley has received the Golden Geek Award in 2024.
