= Ed Cox (artist) =

Artist

- Born: Henry "Ed" Edsel Cox; January 14, 1959; Cocoa Beach, FL
- Died: December 10, 2022 (aged 63); Gastonia, NC
- Known for: Fantasy art

H. Ed Cox was an American artist and fantasy illustrator whose work has appeared in role-playing games.

== Early life and education ==
Ed Cox attended Ringling School of Art from 1977-1978, and received a fine arts degree from Salisbury State University in 1995.

== Career ==
Ed Cox was a professional artist whose focus included science fiction and fantasy art, as well as wildlife art, and his clients included Roc Books, Wizards of the Coast, The Sportsman’s Guide, and many trading-card game companies.

His Dungeons & Dragons work includes the 3.5 Dungeon Master's Guide (2003), Complete Warrior (2003), Frostburn (2004), Races of Destiny (2004), Sandstorm (2005), Lords of Madness (2005), Tome of Magic (2006), Complete Scoundrel (2007), and Magic Item Compendium (2007).

He has also worked on the Legend of the Five Rings, and 7th Sea collectible card games.

He did the cover art for Mark W. Tiedemann's 2001 novel Compass Reach.

He has illustrated box covers for MPC model kits based on Star Wars and other franchises.

He was the guest of honor at the Oasis 17 science fiction literary convention in 2004.

Cox was nominated for a Chesley Award, for Best Monochrome Work – Unpublished, in 1999, for his work "A Hard Act to Follow".

== Personal life ==
Ed Cox lived in the Pacific Northwest.
