= Howard Lyon =

American fantasy artist

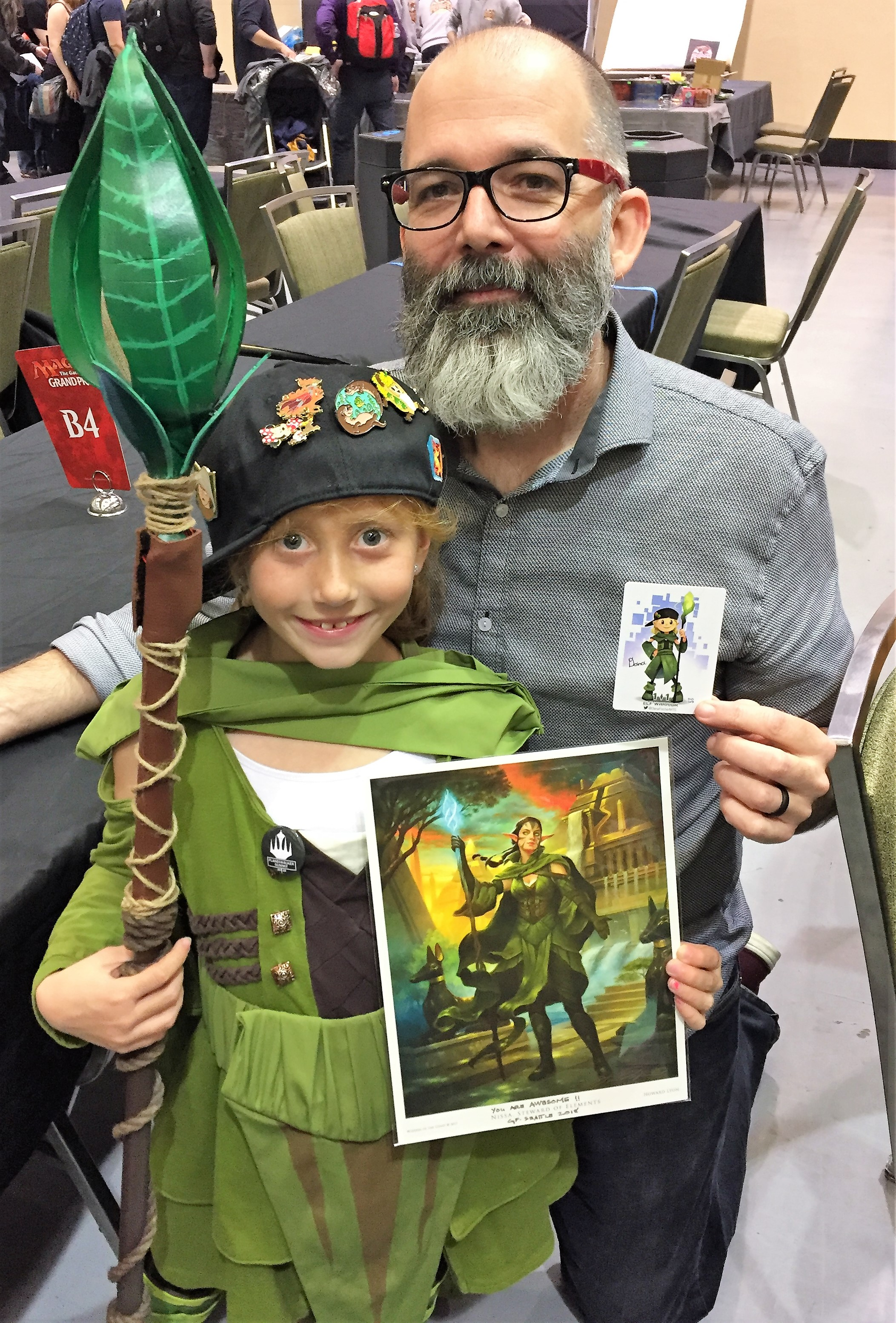
- Lyon with Dana Fischer cosplaying as his Magic: the Gathering card artwork Nissa, Steward of Elements.
- Known for: Fantasy art

Howard Lyon is an American fantasy artist whose work has appeared in role-playing games and Magic: the Gathering.

== Early life and education ==
Howard Lyon was born in Mesa, Arizona and studied illustration at Brigham Young University (BYU) working with artists such as Robert T. Barrett, Don Seegmiller, James C. Christensen.

== Career ==
His Dungeons & Dragons work includes Monster Manual III (2004), Player's Handbook II (2006), Monster Manual IV (2006), Tome of Magic (2006), Tome of Battle (2006), Cityscape (2006), Complete Scoundrel (2007), Rules Compendium (2007), Elder Evils (2007), and the 4th edition Manual of the Planes (2008).

He is known for his work on the Magic: The Gathering collectible card game. Lyon has also worked in the video game industry as an Art Director and as a concept artist and freelance illustrator for Blizzard Entertainment and Electronic Arts.

Lyon has illustrated children's books, including David Farland's 2005 book Of Mice and Magic. Lyon has also done illustrations for the online fantasy and science fiction magazine the InterGalactic Medicine Show (sometimes shortened to IGMS) founded by author Orson Scott Card. Works include Mazer in Prison (October 2005), Dream Engine (October 2006), Body Language (November 2009), and Expendables (October 2010).

A member of the Church of Jesus Christ of Latter-day Saints (LDS Church), Lyon shifted his focus to religious art when the video game company he was working for closed.

In February 2020 Lyon was the Artist Guest of Honor and Keynote Speaker at the 38th annual Life, the Universe, & Everything professional science fiction and fantasy arts symposium.
