= Jim Nelson (artist) =

Artist

- Known for: Fantasy art

Jim Nelson is an artist whose work has appeared in role-playing games.

== Career ==
Nelson was interested in art at an early age and went to Northern Illinois University to study art. He first worked professionally in 1986 for the game publisher FASA, and while there worked on several ranges including Shadowrun, BattleTech, and Earthdawn.

In 1998, Nelson moved to Wizards of the Coast, who had just acquired TSR, creators of Dungeons & Dragons. His D&D work included Races of Stone (2004), Races of Destiny (2004), Sandstorm (2005), Lords of Madness (2005), Stormwrack (2005), Player's Handbook II (2006), Monster Manual IV (2006), Complete Mage (2006), and the 4th edition Monster Manual (2008).

He also created cards for Magic: The Gathering, Hearthstone, Hex: Shards of Fate, Anachronism and Vampire: The Eternal Struggle.

Nelson became a freelance artist in 2000.

== Reception ==
In his 2023 book Monsters, Aliens, and Holes in the Ground, RPG historian Stu Horvath reviewed the dystopian role-playing game Shadowrun and noted, "It is Jim Nelson who exemplifies Shadowrun's overwrought urban look."
