= Todd Lockwood =

American fantasy and science fiction artist (born 1957)

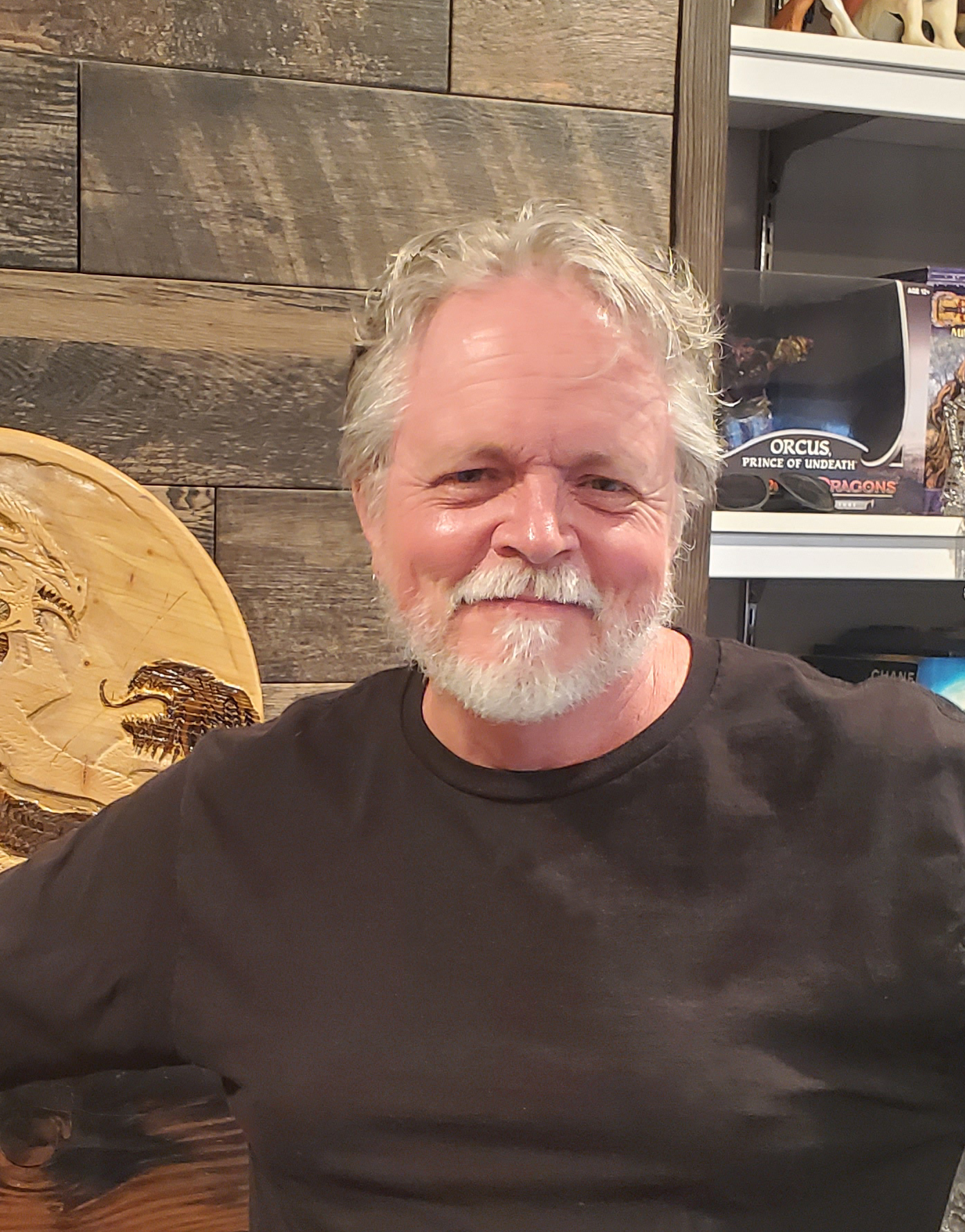
- Todd Lockwood in his studio, 2024
- Born: July 9, 1957 (age 68); Boulder, Colorado, US
- Known for: Fantasy art

Todd Wills Lockwood (born July 9, 1957) is an American artist specializing in fantasy and science fiction illustration. He is best known for his work on the role-playing game Dungeons & Dragons, and for his covers for the books of R. A. Salvatore. His art has also appeared in books from Tor Books, DAW Books, and on magazine covers, including Satellite Orbit magazine in 1984–1985, Asimov's Science Fiction, Analog Science Fiction and Science Fact, Realms of Fantasy, Dragon Magazine, and Dungeon Magazine.

== Biography ==
Todd Lockwood was born in Boulder, Colorado. Lockwood received his education at The Art Institute of Colorado, in Denver, Colorado, and went to work immediately in the design and advertising world. Lockwood worked for a design agency for a year and a half, and won numerous awards in the Art Directors Club of New York's annual show. He then focused his career on illustration, doing freelance illustration for about fifteen years: "Coors was one of my biggest clients... I could paint beer cans in my sleep. At one point I had some covers I had done for Satellite Orbit magazine. For years after that I was 'the satellite dish guy.' I came to really hate satellite dishes and beer cans. If I had ever had a painting with both a beer can and a satellite dish in it, my ad career would have been complete."

Lockwood was an avid Dungeons & Dragons game player, and a fan of fantasy art. "I flipped when TSR started having really good art in their products... Jeff Easley's stuff particularly interested me: so moody and fluid, so deft. Then Brom came along and really blew my doors off." Lockwood decided to try fantasy and science-fiction illustration: "My first artistic influence, like so many in this field, was Frank Frazetta. Later came Michael Whelan, though I had some ad-world influences, too, particularly after I started art school. But I really wanted to be Michael Whelan." Lockwood listed his other influences as David Wilcox, Peter Lloyd, Boris Vallejo, and Jeff Jones. Lockwood first did some covers for Asimov's Science Fiction magazine: "That was the beginning. I felt revived. I was finally painting things that interested me!"

He attended Worldcon, Lockwood's first science fiction convention, in Winnipeg, Manitoba, taking some of his Asimov's covers and some other work to show to artists and art directors in hopes of making contacts with people in the science fiction and fantasy publishing world. "It was a revelation! ... I met other artists and saw so much amazing work. I met Michael Whelan, who responded very favorably to the black and white work I had done, particularly Cerberus. I went home inspired and determined to do more and better work. I got more magazine work and started building a portfolio of published work in the field I had always wanted to be a part of." Lockwood began illustrating cards for Chaosium and Phil Foglio's XXXenophile card game, and soon his friend David Martin suggested him to an art director at TSR, the publisher of the popular role-playing game Dungeons & Dragons. "I had sent TSR portfolios in the past, but now I had a real fantasy portfolio. The art director, Stephen Daniele, gave me a bunch of character portraits for one of the Spellfire decks, then some book covers for TSR. An opportunity to work for TSR full-time came along in 1996, and I jumped at it." In 1997, Wizards of the Coast acquired the TSR properties and moved Lockwood and his family to Washington state.

Lockwood produced art for the Ravenloft, Forgotten Realms, and Dragonlance campaign settings, as well as cover art for novels based on the Forgotten Realms setting. His work is included in the book Masters of Dragonlance Art. Lockwood also became the Vice President of ASFA (the Association of Science Fiction and Fantasy Artists), which sponsored the Chesley Awards for fantasy art at the World Science Fiction Convention. In 1999, he helped to redefine the look of the Dungeons and Dragons game for the Third Edition release. In 2002, after Hasbro bought Wizards of the Coast, Lockwood returned to freelancing.

He and his wife and three children reside in Washington state.

== Works ==
His first art book, Transitions: Art of Todd Lockwood, from the British publisher Chrysalis Books, was released in September 2003.

== Awards ==
His work has been honored with multiple appearances in Spectrum and the Communication Arts Illustration Annual, twelve Chesley Awards, including one for Artistic Achievement, two World Fantasy Art Show Awards, and numerous other industry awards.

- 1995: World Fantasy Art Show Award Best monochrome for Cerberus
- 1996: World Fantasy Art Show Award Best monochrome for Kali
- 1996: Chesley Award Best Monochrome for Cerberus
- 1997: Chesley Award Best Interior Illustration Death Loves Me, magazine Realms of Fantasy, June 1995
- 1998: Chesley Award Best Cover, for Black Dragon, magazine Dragon, August
- 1999:Chesley Award Best Gaming Product, cover for Dragonlance 15th Anniversary Game Module
- 2001: Chesley Award 2001 Best Cover, for Swashbuckler, magazine Dragon, July 2000
- 2003: Chesley Award 2003 Best Cover Illustration, hardback book The Thousand Orcs for Wizards of the Coast
- 2003: Chesley Award 2003 Best Cover Illustration, Hellfire Dragon for the magazine Dragon, December 2002
- 2003: Chesley Award 2003 Best Gaming-Related Illustration, cover for City of the Spider Queen, Dungeons & Dragons game module
- 2004: Chesley Award 2004 Artistic Achievement
- 2004: Chesley Award 2004 Best Cover Illustration, paperback book Tangled Webs for Wizards of the Coast
- 2004: Chesley Award 2004 Best Interior Illustration Crossing Into Empire, for Realms of Fantasy magazine
- 2004: Chesley Award 2004 Best Gaming-Related Illustration Draconomicon, Dungeons & Dragons accessory for Wizards of the Coast
