= Michael Phillippi =

American artist (born 1975)

- Known for: Fantasy art

Michael Phillippi (born c. 1975) is an American artist whose work has appeared in role-playing games.

== Education ==
Michael Phillippi started his illustration career in 1997 after graduating from the Savannah College of Art & Design.

== Career ==
His Dungeons & Dragons work includes Libris Mortis (2004), Races of Destiny (2004), Complete Adventurer (2005), Sandstorm (2005), Lords of Madness (2005), Stormwrack (2005), Tome of Magic (2006), Complete Scoundrel (2007), Rules Compendium (2007), and Elder Evils (2007).

He is known for his work on the Magic: The Gathering collectible card game.
