= Jeremy Jarvis =

American artist

- Education: Pratt Institute
- Known for: Fantasy art

Jeremy Jarvis is an artist whose work has appeared in role-playing games.

== Early life and education ==
Jeremy Jarvis grew up in a small town in Alabama, and moved to New York City right after high school just before his eighteenth birthday. There, he attended Pratt Institute as a Fine Arts major, graduating Summa Cum Laude. His work has been included in The Spectrum Awards and The Society of Illustrators' Annual Exhibition.

== Works ==
Jeremy Jarvis produced interior illustrations for many Dungeons & Dragons books and Dragon magazine, as well as cover art for Stormwrack (2005). He has also produced artwork for other games including Werewolf: The Apocalypse (White Wolf Publishing) and Iron Heroes (Malhavoc Press). He also illustrated cards for the Magic: The Gathering and Legend of the Five Rings collectible card games.

He works as an art director for Wizards of the Coast, and was nominated for the Chesley Award for Best Art Director in 2007 and 2009.
