= Steven Belledin =

American artist

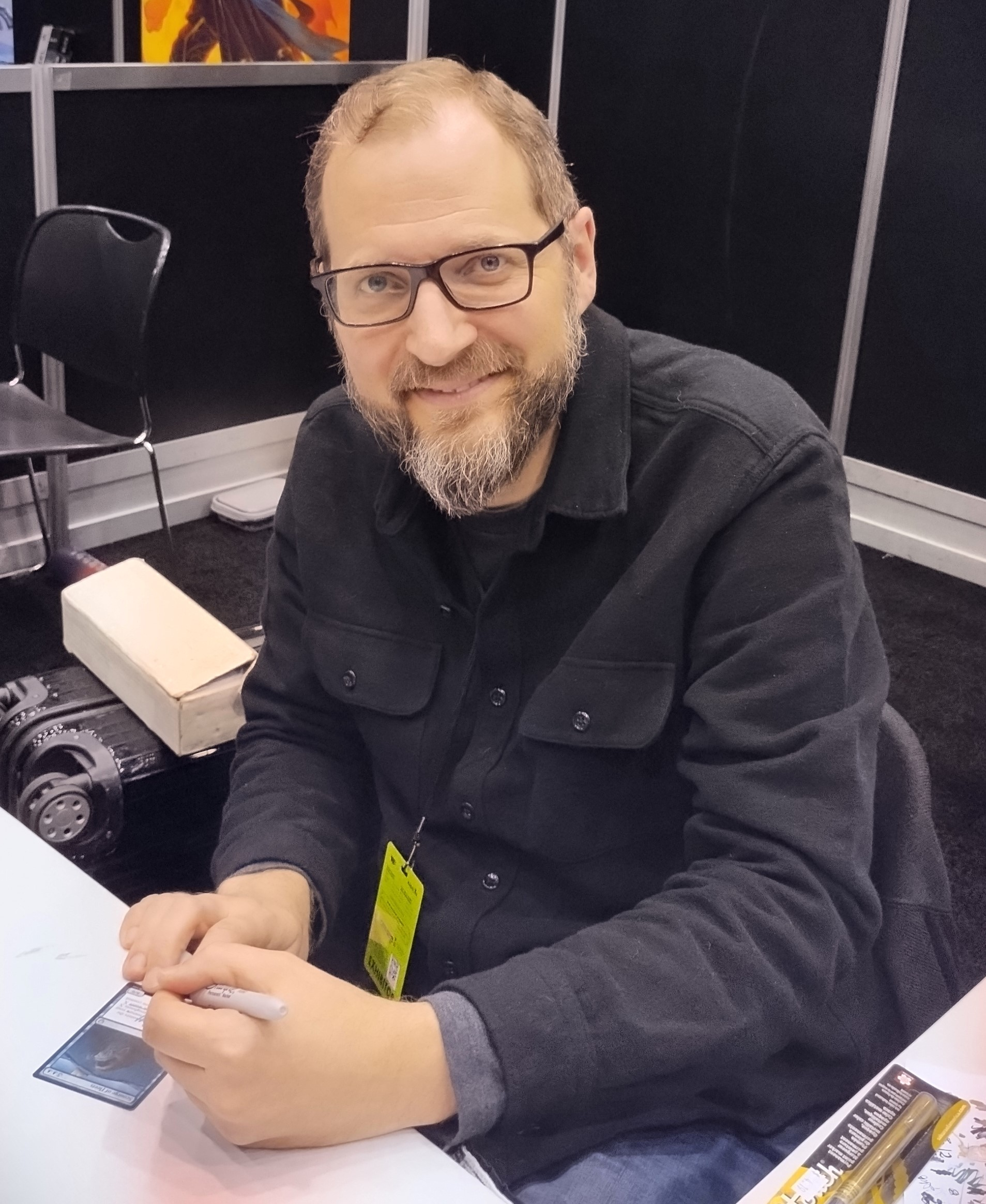
- Belledin at Chicago MagicCon in 2025
- Known for: Fantasy art

Steven Belledin is an artist whose work has appeared in role-playing games and collectable card games.

== Early life and education ==
Steven Belledin was raised in Pennsylvania. He studied at the Pratt Institute in Brooklyn.

== Career ==
Steven Belledin has done work for Harper Collins, Estee Lauder Companies, Wizards of the Coast, Upper Deck, Sabertooth Games, Alderac Entertainment Group, Fantasy Flight Games, Hidden City Games, and Hidden Kingdom Games. His awards and honors include the Gencon Art Show's 2008 Best In Show, ConGlomeration Art Show's 2010 Best in Show, and ConGlomeration's 2010 Artist Guest of Honor. His Dungeons & Dragons work includes books such as Libris Mortis, Races of Stone, and Complete Divine.

Belledin provided cover art for the 2009 book Badass: A Relentless Onslaught of the Toughest Warlords, Vikings, Samurai, Pirates, Gunfighters, and Military Commanders to Ever Live by Ben Thompson.

Belledin is also known for his work on the Magic: The Gathering collectible card game. Belledin made his Magic debut with a pair of Coldsnap illustrations in 2006 and became a staple Magic artist with the Lorwyn set, which included seven of his pieces. Belledin has illustrated over 150 Magic cards, and in 2019 the original painting for his The Akroan War saga sold $15,000 at auction, and the website Hipsters of the Coast declared that "Whether it is a planeswalker, basic land cycle, Masterpiece sword, staple playable card, or just a regular commission; Belledin puts 110% into his illustrations, and it shows. He is quietly one of the very best in the game, and his work is something we all should be looking at and talking about more."
