= Ron Spencer =

American illustrator

- Born: Aurora, Nebraska, U.S.
- Occupation: Artist

Ron Spencer is an American illustrator whose most famous work has been for the collectible card game Magic: The Gathering.

== Early life ==
Ron Spencer grew up on a farm in Aurora, Nebraska. As a child, his reading material included such Marvel Comics as Conan the Barbarian.

== Artwork ==
Spencer is primarily self-taught though he did attend a two-year college in Idaho. He uses various elements of mixed media, including colored pencils, ballpoint pens, watercolors, and acrylic paint. His trademark on a vast majority of his earlier trading cards is a hidden name somewhere in the artwork. For example, the name DALE can be clearly seen in the Alliance expansion card Misfortune. He lists his inspirations as Richard Corben and Swamp Thing illustrator Bernie Wrightson.

He has also created artwork for several books of the World of Darkness series from White Wolf, Inc, as well as the Talislanta line of role-playing games.

Ron Spencer lives in Aurora, Nebraska. He has six children with his late wife Stacie who died in 2009. He is also brother to fellow artist Terese Nielsen.

== Plush toys ==
Ron Spencer has also actively worked with Toy Vault, Inc. in creating plush toys and slippers, with various designs under their horror and fantasy brands such as Cthulhu, "Here Be Monsters", and dragons. Among these designs is the rare Necronomicon plush book.

== Altered cards ==
Ron Spencer releases periodically altered Magic cards also commonly known as Extreme Alteration. The cards are painted over with different artwork incorporating the original picture. Other Magic: The Gathering artists such as Terese Nielsen and Mark Poole also provide this service for their fans.

== Bibliography ==
=== Magic: The Gathering sets ===
Some cards listed are reprinted from set to set.

- Alpha (1993) - 1 card
- Beta (1993) - 1 card
- Unlimited (1993) - 1 card
- Revised (1994) - 1 card
- The Dark (1994) - 10 cards
- Fallen Empires - (1994) - 8 cards
- 4th Edition (1995) - 4 cards
- Ice Age (1995) - 5 cards
- Alliances (1996) - 2 cards
- Mirage (1996) - 7 cards
- Visions (1997) - 3 cards
- Fifth Edition (1997) - 10 cards
- Weatherlight (1997) - 6 cards
- Tempest (1997) - 10 cards
- Stronghold (1998) - 9 cards
- Exodus (1998) - 7 cards
- Urza's Saga (1998) - 17 cards
- Urza's Legacy (1999) - 5 cards
- Urza's Destiny (1999) - 3 cards
- Classic (Sixth Edition) (1999) - 4 cards
- Mercadian Masques (1999) - 5 cards
- Nemesis (2000) - 3 cards
- Prophecy (2000) - 3 cards
- Invasion (2000) - 9 cards^{1}
- Seventh Edition (2001) - 7 cards
- Planeshift (2001) - 3 cards
- Apocalypse (2001) - 5 cards
- Odyssey (2001) - 9 cards
- Torment (2002) - 2 cards
- Judgment (2002) - 3 cards
- Onslaught (2002) - 10 cards
- Legions (2003) - 3 cards
- Scourge (2003) - 4 cards
- Eighth Edition (2003) - 8 cards
- Ninth Edition (2005) - 3 cards
- Tenth Edition (2007) - 5 cards
- Magic 2010 (2009) - 1 card
- Magic 2011 (2010) - 1 card
- Dominaria Remastered (2023) - 3 cards
- March of the Machine Commander (2023) - 1 card
- Commander Masters (2023) - 2 cards
- Modern Horizons 3 (2024) - 1 card
- Foundations (2024) - 2 cards (reprints)
- Aetherdrift (2025) - 3 cards
- Aetherdrift Commander (2025) - 1 card
- Tarkir: Dragonstorm (2025) - 4 cards
- Edge of Eternities (2025) - 1 card
- Lorwyn Eclipsed (2026) - 4 cards

=== Dungeons & Dragons ===
- Ghostwalk (2003)
- Draconomicon (2003)
- Complete Warrior (2003)
- Book of Exalted Deeds (2003)
- Unearthed Arcana (2004)
- Races of Stone (2004)
- Complete Divine (2004)
- Complete Arcane (2004)
- Sandstorm (2005)
- Lords of Madness (2005)
- Complete Adventurer (2005)
- Player's Handbook II (2006)

=== Hearthstone ===
- Master of Disguise (Classic Set)

== Notes ==
1. Includes 2 versions of Swamp.
