= David L. Martin =

Artist

David Martin is an artist whose work has appeared in role-playing games.

== Works ==
David Martin has produced interior illustrations for Dungeons & Dragons books since 1990, as well as cover art for Domains of Dread (1997). He has also produced artwork for other games including Earthdawn and Shadowrun (FASA).

He has also illustrated cards for the Magic: The Gathering collectible card game.
