= William O'Connor (artist) =

American artist

- Born: September 22, 1970
- Died: January 31, 2018 (aged 47)
- Resting place: Northport Rural Cemetery (Northport, New York)
- Occupation: Artist

William Matthew O'Connor (September 22, 1970 – January 31, 2018) was an American artist whose work appeared in role-playing games, books, video games and concept art.

== Early life and education ==
William O'Connor was born on Long Island, New York. He enrolled at the age of ten at the Huntington School of Fine Arts (HSFA), and after high school he attended Alfred University, where he earned a Bachelor of Fine Arts degree cum laude in 1992. He also enrolled in illustration programs at the School of Visual Arts and Parsons School of Design in Manhattan.

== Works ==
William O'Connor produced interior illustrations for many Dungeons & Dragons books from 1995, and also cover art for the Living Greyhawk Gazetteer (2000). He also produced artwork for other games including several game systems by White Wolf, such as Ars Magica and Trinity. O'Connor produced a majority of the illustrations for the Star Wars New Essential Guide to Alien Species (2006).

He also wrote instructional art books, such as Dracopedia: A Guide to Drawing the Dragons of the World.

O'Connor was nominated for a Chesley Award in 2002, for Best Gaming-Related Illustration, for Respite card art, "Legend of the Five Rings".

O'Connor did artwork for Magic: The Gathering.
