= Franz Vohwinkel =

German artist and illustrator (born 1964)

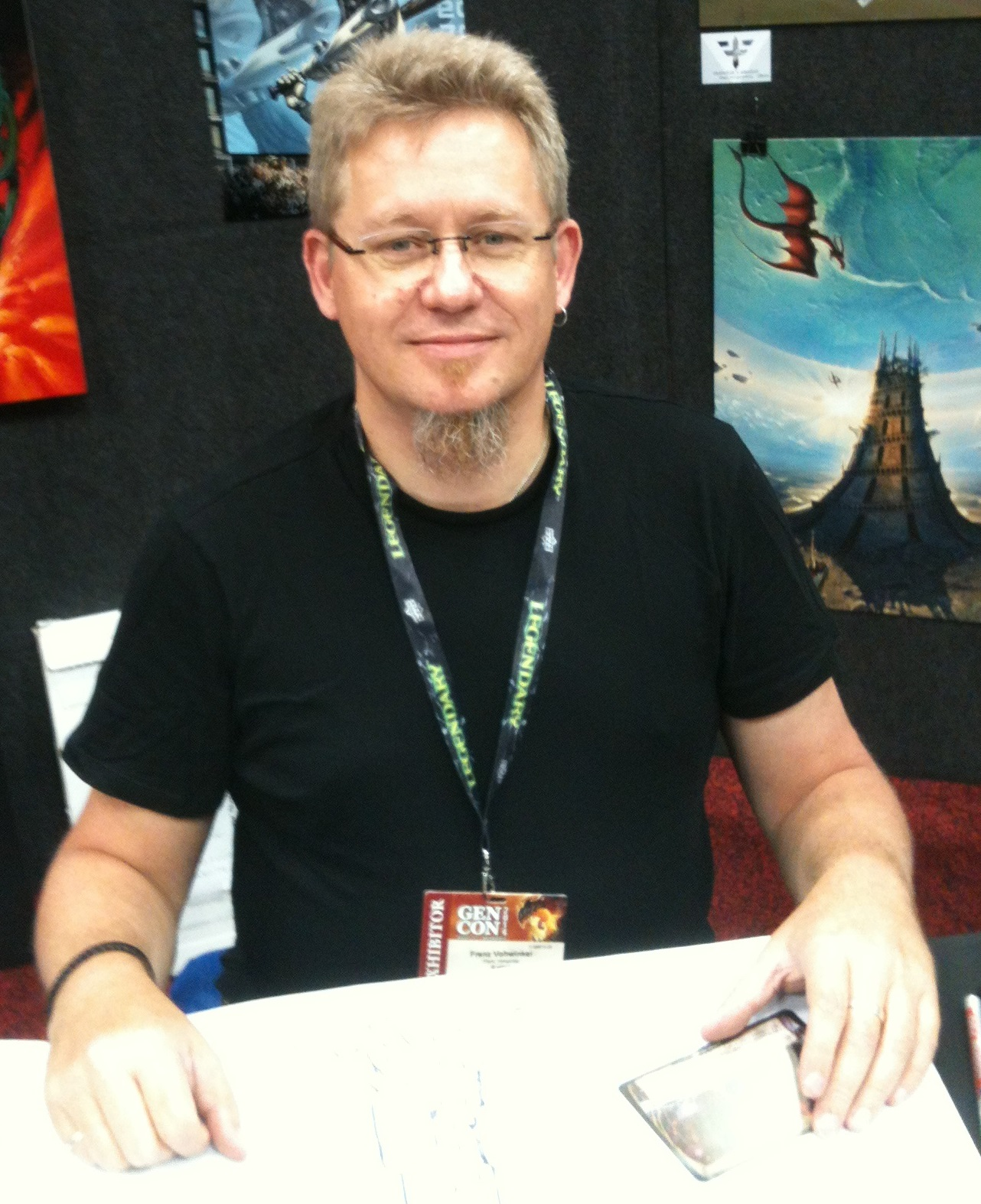
- Born: 1964 (age 61–62); Munich, West Germany
- Known for: Fantasy art

Franz Vohwinkel (born 1964 in Munich, West Germany) is an artist and illustrator whose artwork has been featured in role-playing games.

== Early life and education ==
Vohwinkel was born in Munich. He studied communication design at Darmstadt University of Applied Science. While there, he tried his hand at creating a comic book, but felt he lacked the skill as a writer to tell really good stories. A second effort collaborating with a writer did not go well, and Vohwinkel decided to look for other artistic media.

== Artist ==
After graduating in 1990, Vohwinkel did a year of community service. During this time, he placed a small ad in the Darmstadt University newspaper offering his services as an artist. The only person to reply was game designer Klaus Teuber, who needed an artist for a game he was designing. The game was Drunter und Drüber (Upside Down), which went on to win the 1991 Spiel des Jahres and sold 300,000 copies. Vohwinkel became am important artist in the German game industry, eventually creating art for over 300 board games, two of which went on to win Spiel des Jahres, and one, Kingdoms becoming winner of the Origins Award for Best Abstract Board Game of 2002.

Vohwinkel also did cover art for North American companies, including TSR's Dataware (1998) for their Alternity game, and illustrated cards for the Magic: The Gathering collectible card game, as well as interior illustrations on a number of Dungeons & Dragons books for Wizards of the Coast, including Races of Stone (2004), Monster Manual III (2004), Complete Arcane (2004), Stormwrack (2005), Races of Eberron (2005), Complete Adventurer (2005), Tome of Magic: Pact, Shadow, and Truename Magic (2006), Power of Faerûn (2006), Fiendish Codex I: Hordes of the Abyss (2006), Player's Handbook II, and Drow of the Underdark (2007), as well as the cover of Dragon #425 (July 2013). Vohwinkel also recreated the map of Dungeon for the re-imagined 2010 edition of the game by WotC. Other RPG work included Realms of Sorcery (2005) and Old World Armoury (2005) for the Warhammer Fantasy Roleplay game by Black Industries, and The Four Winds (2005) for Legend of the Five Rings by Alderac Entertainment Group.

He also worked for the German company Fantasy Productions on their version of the BattleTech game, producing art for the Field Manual: Mercenaries, Revised (2003), Handbook: House Steiner (2004), and Classic Battletech Master Rules, Revised Ed. (2004).

== Legacy ==
Vincent Berry and Annie Xiange noted that "Boxes of modern European board games typically credit the artist as well as the designer" and because of this, called Vohwinkel a household name for hobbyists.
