= Steve Prescott (artist) =

Artist

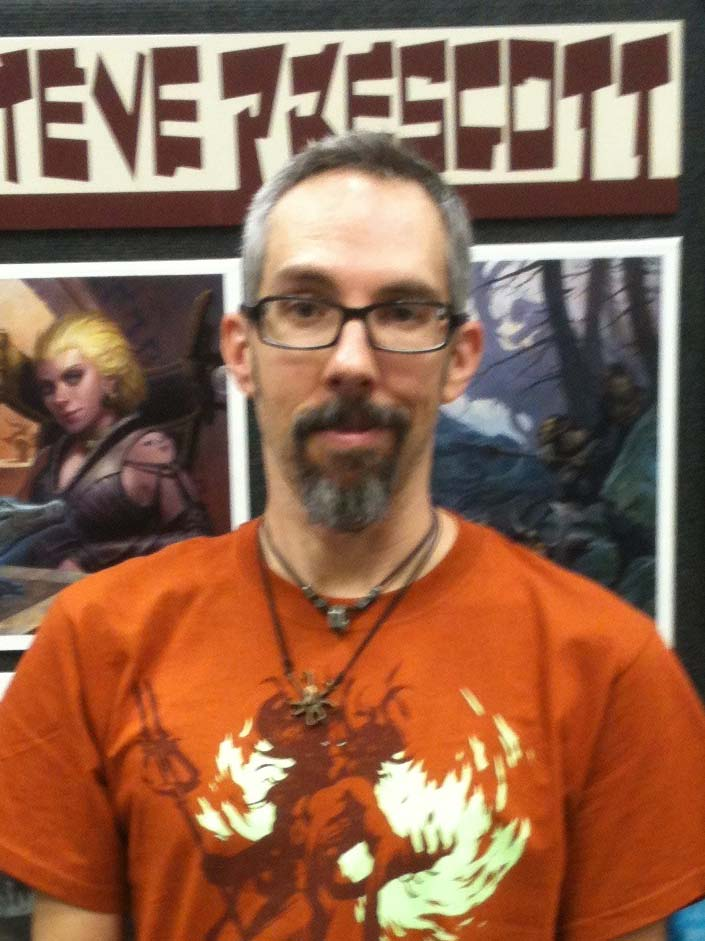
- Prescott at Gen Con in 2014
- Known for: Fantasy art

Steve Prescott is an artist whose work has appeared in role-playing games.

== Early life and education ==
Steve Prescott grew up in Cleveland, Ohio, and he graduated with a BFA in Illustration from Columbus College of Art and Design.

== Works ==
Steve Prescott has produced interior illustrations for many Dungeons & Dragons books and Dragon magazine, as well as cover art for books such as Fortress of the Yuan-Ti. He has also produced artwork for other games such as Paizo Pathfinder, World of Warcraft TCG, Werewolf: The Apocalypse (White Wolf) and Shadowrun (FASA). Most notable, he has worked on the popular collectible card game Magic: The Gathering since 2006 both in card art form as well as conceptual design.
