= Wayne Reynolds =

British artist

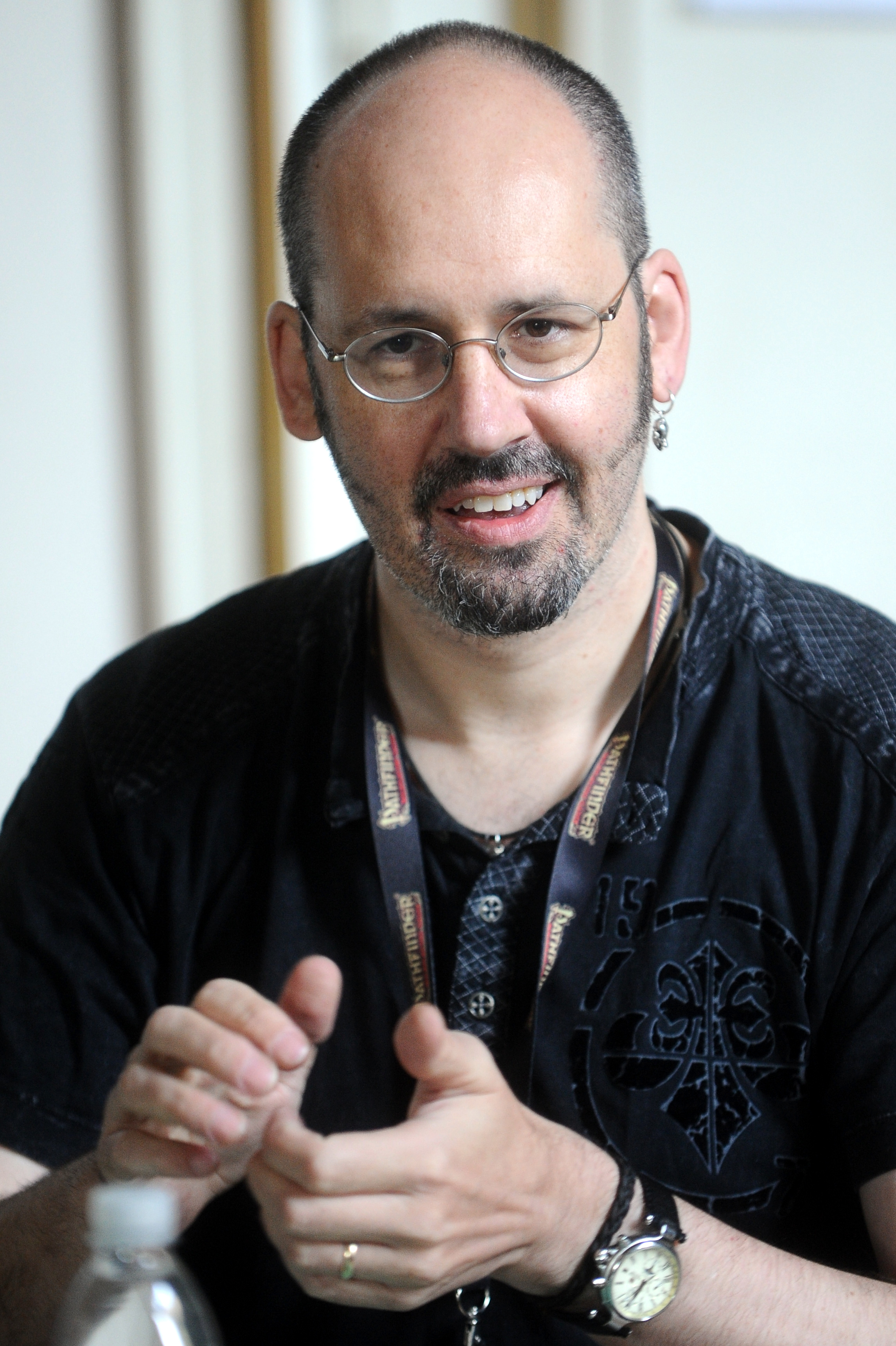
- Wayne Reynolds at Lucca Comics & Games 2014
- Born: Leeds, United Kingdom
- Areas: Penciller, Inker

Wayne Reynolds is a British artist whose work has appeared in comics and role-playing games.

== Early life and education ==
Wayne Reynolds was born in Leeds, UK. He attended art college in Dewsbury and Middlesbrough.

== Games ==
Wayne Reynolds has continued to produce interior illustrations for many Dungeons & Dragons books and Dragon magazine since 1999, as well as cover art for Deep Dwarven Delve (1999), Reverse Dungeon (2000), Complete Warrior (2003), and several books for the Eberron campaign setting. He has also produced artwork for many other games including Pendragon (Chaosium), Rolemaster (Iron Crown Enterprises), and the GameMastery line (Paizo Publishing), and illustrated cards for the Magic: The Gathering collectible card game and the video game Hearthstone.

Reynolds has also produced numerous covers for the Pathfinder Roleplaying Game.

In 2014, Scott Taylor of Black Gate, named Wayne Reynolds as #2 in a list of The Top 10 RPG Artists of the Past 40 Years, saying "Since he started getting covers, his artwork has gone on to champion two of the largest gaming lines and companies the genre has ever known."

== Comics ==
Reynolds has also done work on British comics, in particular at 2000 AD on stories like Sláine, and Judge Dredd. He also worked with 2000 AD creators on Warhammer Monthly on the stories The Redeemer and Kal Jerico.

== Historical art ==
From 2000 to 2004, Reynolds did artwork for Osprey Publishing's series of historical reference books.

== Achievements ==
In 2026, Reynolds was inducted into The Academy of Adventure Gaming Arts and Design for his continued work in the RPG space.

== Bibliography ==
=== Comics ===
Comics work includes:

- Sláine (with Pat Mills):
  - "The Banishing" (in 2000 AD #1108-1109, 1998)
  - "The Triple Death" (in 2000 AD #1111, 1998)
- The Redeemer (with Pat Mills/Debbie Gallagher, Black Library, in Warhammer Monthly #16 (prelude), 18, 20, 22, June–September 1999, tpb, 96 pages, 2000, ISBN 1-84154-120-6, included in tpb, 104 pages, 2003, ISBN 1-84154-274-1)
- Pulp Sci-Fi: "Endangered Species" (with Kek-W, in 2000 AD #1171, November 1999)
- Judge Dredd:
  - "The Triple Death" (with Alan Grant, in 2000 AD #1182, March 2000)
  - "Dead Ringer" (with John Wagner, in Judge Dredd Megazine vol. 3 #66, June 2000)
  - "Flippers" (with John Wagner, in Judge Dredd Megazine vol. 4 #7-8, February–March 2002)
- Tharg's Future Shocks: "Dwellers in the Depths" (with Steve Moore, in 2000 AD #1206, August 2000)
- Kal Jerico (with Gordon Rennie, in Warhammer Monthly #28-29, 31, 34, 36-37, 45, 56-59, 63-66, March–April, June, September, November–December 2000, August 2001, June–September 2002, December 2002 - March 2003, early stories collected in Kal Jerico II: Contracts and Agendas, 54 pages, 2001, ISBN 1-84154-209-1, those and more included in Kal Jerico: Underhive Bounty Hunter, Necromunda series, Black Library, 176 pages, 2005, ISBN 1-84416-254-0)
- Mean Machine: "Support Yore Local Bastich" (with Gordon Rennie, in Judge Dredd Megazine vol. 3 #75, March 2001)
- Missionary Man: "Silence" (with Gordon Rennie, in Judge Dredd Megazine vol. 3 #77, May 2001)
- Crimson Tide (with Gordon Rennie, in Warhammer Monthly #86, December 2004)

=== Artbooks ===
- Dungeons & Dragons: The Art of Wayne Reynolds (2010)
- Visions of War: The Art of Wayne Reynolds (2013)
