= Fantastic art =

Type of art that explores fantasy and imagination

The Garden of Earthly Delights in the Museo del Prado in Madrid, c. 1495–1505, by Hieronymus Bosch

Fantastic art is a broad and loosely defined art genre. It is not restricted to a specific school of artists, geographical location or historical period. It can be characterised by subject matter—which portrays non-realistic, mystical, mythical or folkloric subjects or events—and style, which is representational and naturalistic, rather than abstract—or in the case of magazine illustrations and similar, in the style of graphic novel art such as manga.

Fantasy has been an integral part of art since its beginnings, but has been particularly important in mannerism, magic realist painting, romantic art, symbolism, surrealism and lowbrow. In French, the genre is called le fantastique, in English it is sometimes referred to as visionary art, grotesque art or mannerist art. It has had a deep and circular interaction with fantasy literature.

The subject matter of fantastic art may resemble the product of hallucinations, and Fantastic artist Richard Dadd spent much of his life in mental institutions. Salvador Dalí famously said: "the only difference between me and a madman is that I am not mad". Some recent fantastic art draws on the artist's experience, or purported experience, of hallucinogenic drugs.

The term fantasy art is closely related, and is applied primarily to recent art (typically 20th century on wards) inspired by, or illustrating fantasy literature.

Fantastic art has traditionally been largely confined to painting and illustration, but since the 1970s has increasingly been found also in photography. Fantastic art explores fantasy, imagination, the dream state, the grotesque, visions and the uncanny, as well as so-called "Goth" and "Dark" art.

== Related genres ==
Genres which may also be considered as fantastic art include the Weltlandschaften or world landscapes of the Northern Renaissance, Symbolism of the Victorian era, Pre-Raphaelites, the Golden Age of Illustration, and Surrealism. Works based on classical mythology, which have been a staple of European art from the Renaissance period, also arguably meet the definition of fantastic art, as art based on modern mythology such as J.R.R. Tolkien's Middle Earth mythos unquestionably does. Religious art also depicts supernatural or miraculous subjects in a naturalistic way, but is not generally regarded as fantastic art.

== Historic artists and fine artists ==
Many artists have produced works which fit the definition of fantastic art. Some, such as Nicholas Roerich, worked almost exclusively in the genre, others such as Hieronymus Bosch, who has been described as the first "fantastic" artist in the Western tradition, produced works both with and without fantastic elements, and for artists such as Francisco de Goya, fantastic works were only a small part of their output. Others again such as René Magritte are usually classed as Surrealists but use fantastic elements in their work.

== Twentieth century ==
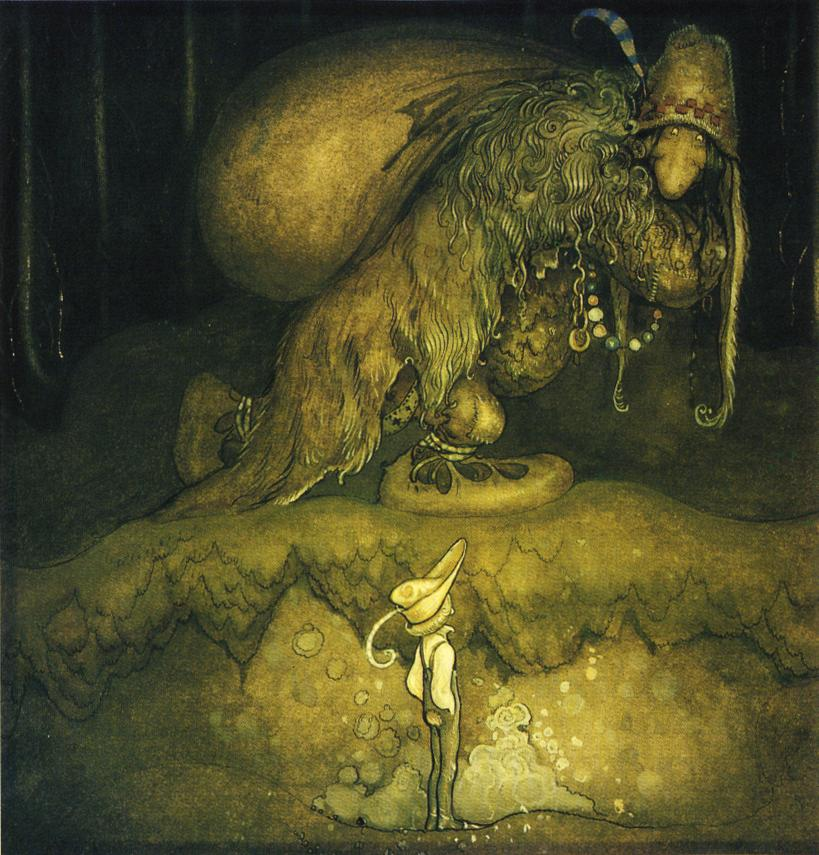
Illustration for The boy and the trolls by John Bauer, 1915

The rise of fantasy and science fiction "pulp" magazines demanded artwork to illustrate stories and (via cover art) to promote sales. This led to a movement of science fiction and fantasy artists prior to and during the Great Depression, as anthologised by Vincent Di Fate, himself a prolific SF and space artist.

In the United States in the 1930s, a group of Wisconsin artists inspired by the Surrealist movement of Europe created their own brand of fantastic art. They included Madison, Wisconsin-based artists Marshall Glasier, Dudley Huppler and John Wilde; Karl Priebe of Milwaukee and Gertrude Abercrombie of Chicago. Their art combined macabre humor, mystery and irony which was in direct and pointed contradiction to the American Regionalism then in vogue.

In postwar Chicago, the art movement Chicago Imagism produced many fantastic and grotesque paintings, which were little noted because they did not conform to New York abstract art fashions of the time. Major imagists include Roger Brown, Gladys Nilsson, Jim Nutt, Ed Paschke, and Karl Wirsum.

After 1970, modern western fantasy is influenced by illustrations from Conan the Barbarian and The Lord of the Rings, as well as popular works of SF and fantasy like the role-playing game Advanced Dungeons & Dragons or the French Heavy Metal magazine.

== See also ==
- Dream art
- Society for the Art of Imagination
- Surrealism
- Vienna School of Fantastic Realism

== Bibliography ==
- Álvaro Robles, G. (2016) "El Canto de Abraxas". Editorial Salón Arcano. ISBN 978-987-42-2189-6
- BeinArt collective (2007). Metamorphosis. beinArt. ISBN 978-0-9803231-0-8
- Coleman, A.D. (1977). The Grotesque in Photography. New York: Summit, Ridge Press.
- Colombo, Attilio (1979). Fantastic Photographs. London: Gordon Fraser.
- Clair, Jean (1995). Lost Paradise: Symbolist Europe. Montreal: Montreal Museum of Fine Arts.
- Day, Holliday T. & Sturges, Hollister (1989). Art of the Fantastic: Latin America, 1920–1987. Indianapolis: Indianapolis Museum of Art.
- Elizabeth, S. (2023). The Art of Fantasy: A visual sourcebook of all that is unreal. Frances Lincoln. ISBN 978-0-7112-7995-7.
- Johnson, Diana L. (1979). Fantastic illustration and design in Britain, 1850–1930. Rhode Island School of Design.
- Krichbaum, Jorg & Zondergeld. R.A. (Eds.) (1985). Dictionary of Fantastic Art. Barron's Educational Series.
- Larkin, David, ed. (1973). Fantastic Art. Ballantine Books. ISBN 978-0-3450-9797-2.
- Menton, Seymour (1983). Magic Realism Rediscovered 1918–1981. Philadelphia, The Art Alliance Press.
- Palumbo, Donald (Ed.) (1986). Eros in the Mind's Eye: Sexuality and the Fantastic in Art and Film (Contributions to the Study of Science Fiction and Fantasy). Greenwood Press.
- Schurian, Prof. Dr. Walter (2005). Fantastic Art. Taschen. ISBN 978-3-8228-2954-7 (English edition)
- Stathatos, John (2001). A Vindication of Tlon: Photography and the Fantastic. Greece: Thessaloniki Museum of Photography
- Watney, Simon (1977). Fantastic Painters. London: Thames & Hudson.
