= Wayne England =

Artist

- Born: 1959 or 1960
- Died: 9 February 2016 (aged 56); Barnsley, South Yorkshire, England
- Known for: fantasy and science fiction illustration

Wayne England (d. 9 February 2016) was an English artist whose work regularly appeared in role-playing games, wargaming rulebooks and magazines and was used on cards for collectible card games such as Magic: The Gathering.

He died on 9 February 2016. Fellow Magic: The Gathering artist Christopher Rush died a day later.

== Works ==
England produced interior illustrations for Games Workshop since Realms of Chaos books, many Dungeons & Dragons books, and did the cover for Lords of Madness (2005). He also produced artwork for other games such as The Wheel of Time Roleplaying Game (Wizards of the Coast) and Warhammer Fantasy Roleplay (Hogshead Publishing and Black Industries), as well as for White Dwarf magazine.

He illustrated at least 108 different cards for the Magic: The Gathering collectible card game.

Some of his works for Magic: The Gathering include:

- Cryptic Command – Lorwyn
- Ghostly Prison – Planechase 2012
- Goblin Trenches – Apocalypse
- Stony Silence – Innistrad
- Phantom Nantuko – Judgment
- Oblivion Ring – Lorwyn
- Very Cryptic Command – Unstable
- Worldgorger Dragon – Judgment
