= Unearthed Arcana =

AD&D supplement by Gary Gygax

Unearthed Arcana, 1st edition
- Cover of Unearthed Arcana for the 1st edition of Advanced Dungeons & Dragons; cover art by Jeff Easley
- Author: Gary Gygax
- Illustrators: Jeff Easley, Jim Roslof, Roger Raupp, Timothy Truman, and Jim Holloway
- Genre: Role-playing game
- Publisher: TSR, Inc.
- Publication date: 1985
- Media type: Print (Hardback)
- Pages: 128
- ISBN: 0-88038-084-5
- OCLC: 15054860
- Dewey Decimal: 794 19
- LC Class: GV1469.62.D84 G96 1985

Unearthed Arcana (abbreviated UA) is the title shared by two hardback books published for different editions of the Dungeons & Dragons fantasy role-playing game. Both were designed as supplements to the core rulebooks, containing material that expanded upon other rules.

The original Unearthed Arcana was written primarily by Gary Gygax, and published by game publisher TSR in 1985 for use with the Advanced Dungeons & Dragons first edition rules. The book consisted mostly of material previously published in magazines, and included new races, classes, and other material to expand the rules in the Dungeon Masters Guide and Players Handbook. The book was notorious for its considerable number of errors, and was received negatively by the gaming press whose criticisms targeted the over-powered races and classes, among other issues. Gygax intended to use the book's content for a planned second edition of Advanced Dungeons & Dragons; however, much of the book's content was not reused in the second edition, which went into development shortly after Gygax's departure from TSR.

A second book titled Unearthed Arcana was produced by Wizards of the Coast for Dungeons & Dragons third edition in 2004. The designers did not reproduce material from the original book, but instead attempted to emulate its purpose by providing variant rules and options to change the game itself.

The title Unearthed Arcana is also used for a regular series on the official Dungeons & Dragons website that presents new playtest content for Dungeons & Dragons fifth edition.

== Advanced Dungeons & Dragons ==
=== Development history ===
The original Unearthed Arcana was written by Gary Gygax with design and editing contributions by Jeff Grubb and Kim Mohan, respectively, and published by TSR in 1985. Gygax reportedly produced the book to raise money as TSR was deeply in debt at the time. He announced in the March 1985 issue of Dragon magazine that Unearthed Arcana would be released in the summer of that year. He proposed the book as "an interim volume to expand the Dungeon Masters Guide and Players Handbook", as the information was spread out in several places and difficult to keep track of. Unearthed Arcana was to include material previously published in Dragon, written by Gygax and updated and revised for the book. The book would also contain material that had not been published previously, some of it written by other contributors to Dragon. According to British writer Paul Cockburn, some of the material in Unearthed Arcana had been previously published in Imagine magazine.

The original Unearthed Arcana contains errors in its text, which readers discovered and reported to Dragon magazine. Even some positive reviews of the book pointed out the considerable number of mistakes. Dragon editor Kim Mohan, with ideas from Gygax, Frank Mentzer, and Jeff Grubb, addressed the many errors found in the book. In the November 1985 issue of Dragon magazine, Mohan printed four pages of rules corrections and new supplementary material intended to be inserted into the book, as well as some explanations and justifications for items which were not actually errors, and compiled a two-page list of type corrections meant to be pasted into further revisions of Unearthed Arcana. Dragon also devoted the entirety of its "Sage Advice" column in the January 1987 issue to answering questions from readers about Unearthed Arcana, as a follow-up to Mohan's prior column. However, the errata were not incorporated into later printings of the manual.

In 1999, a paperback reprint of the first edition was released.

Wizards of the Coast reproduced the original Unearthed Arcana in a premium edition featuring gilded pages, released on February 19, 2013, following the premium reprints of the original 1st Edition Player's Handbook, Dungeon Masters Guide, and Monster Manual. This reprint is the first printing of the book to be modified using the errata previously published in Dragon magazine incorporated into the corrected text.

=== Contents ===
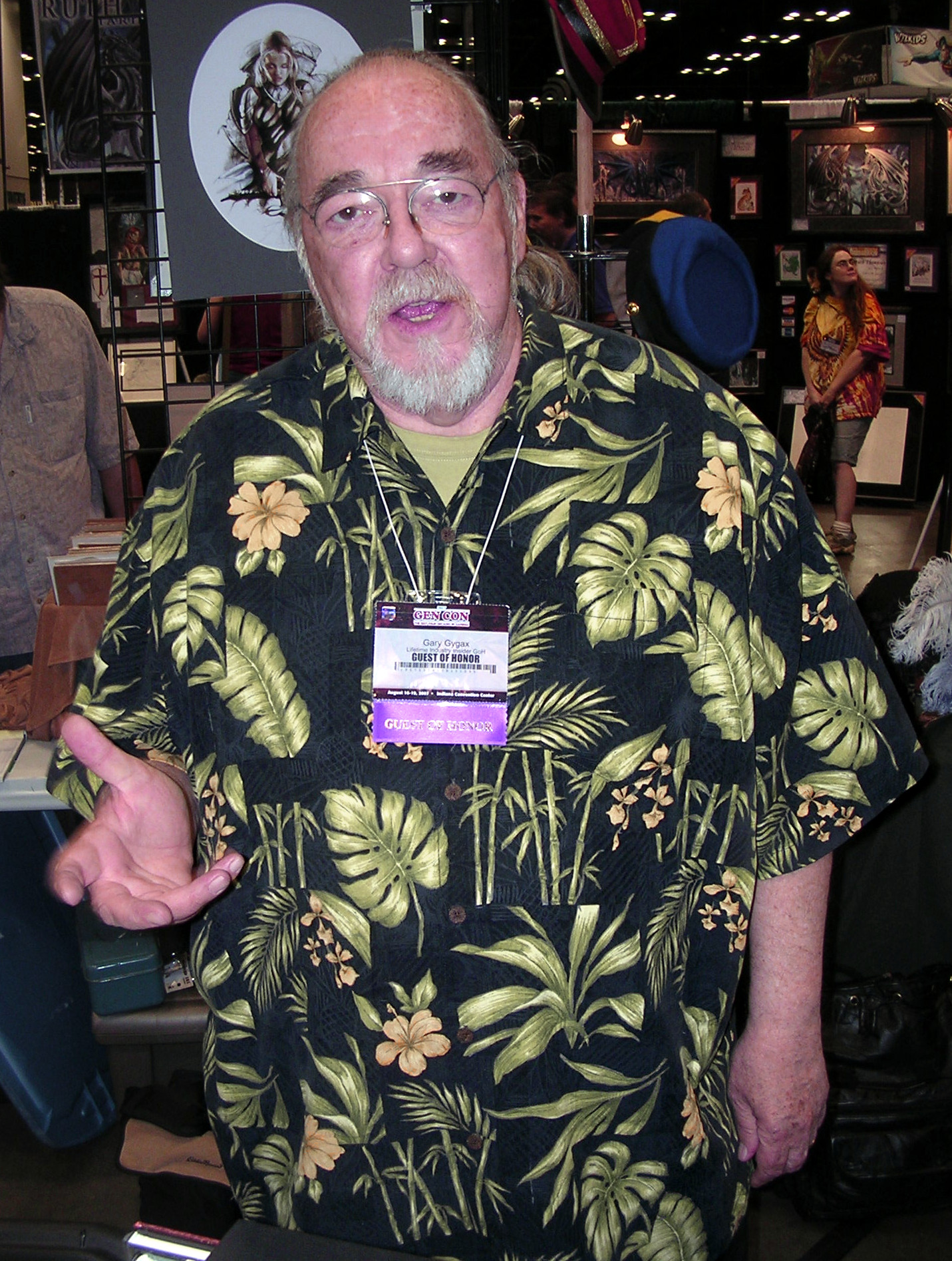
Author Gary Gygax in 2007 at the GenCon game convention

The 128-page Unearthed Arcana was written for use with the Advanced Dungeons & Dragons first edition rules and was divided into two sections: one for players and one for the Dungeon Master (or "DM", the game organizer). The book provided new races, classes, and other expansion material. The book gives details on using "subraces" of the standard races, such as dark elves (drow), and deep gnomes (svirfneblin), for use as player characters and non-player characters.

Unearthed Arcana includes the barbarian (found in Dragon #63), cavalier (found in Dragon #72), and thief-acrobat (found in Dragon #69) character classes, and also includes expansions as well as revisions for the druid and ranger character classes. The book presents new options for character races, including the drow and svirfneblin. The book includes new weapons, and revised information on maximum character levels for non-human player characters. Unearthed Arcana details the weapon specialization rules, in which a fighter or ranger "can adopt a weapon as a special arm, and receive bonuses in its use". The book also describes the comeliness attribute, and contains new spells. The section for the Dungeon Master includes suggestions for handling player characters, tables for social class and rank, new magic items, rules for combat without weapons, and gods for nonhumans.

=== Advanced Dungeons & Dragons 2nd edition ===
By 1985, Gygax was planning a second edition for the Advanced Dungeons & Dragons (AD&D) rules, with his intention to begin work on this in 1986. He intended to incorporate material from Unearthed Arcana, Oriental Adventures, and the original Players Handbook into the new edition's Players Handbook. Gygax used his work on the book to explore ideas for the new edition, such as changing the mechanics for hit dice (the measurement of a character's "health" in the game), and changing the mechanics to allow the game system to work with other genres, and to allow characters to have skills that complement the character classes. Shortly after announcing his intentions for second edition, Gygax was removed as TSR's president and chairman of the board. In 1986, he resigned entirely from TSR, leaving further direction of Dungeons & Dragons to other designers.

The designers of second edition Advanced Dungeons & Dragons removed material from the original Players Handbook in the new edition, as well as much of the new material that had appeared in Unearthed Arcana, which they considered to be "unbalanced". The book had five printings after the release of AD&D 2nd edition with the last printing published two years after the new edition was released.

== Dungeons & Dragons 3rd edition ==
Unearthed Arcana, 3rd edition
- Authors: Andy Collins, Jesse Decker, David Noonan, and Rich Redman
- Genre: Role-playing game
- Publisher: Wizards of the Coast
- Publication date: February 2004
- Media type: Print (Hardback)
- Pages: 224
- ISBN: 0-7869-3131-0

The second book to use the name Unearthed Arcana was written by Andy Collins, Jesse Decker, David Noonan, and Rich Redman, and published in February 2004 by Wizards of the Coast, for use with the Dungeons & Dragons third edition rules. Cover art was by Matt Cavotta, with interior art by Steven Belledin, Ed Cox, Wayne England, Emily Fiegenschuh, David Hudnut, Jeremy Jarvis, Doug Kovacs, John and Laura Lakey, David Martin, Dennis Crabapple McClain, Mark Nelson, James Pavelec, Steve Prescott, David Roach, Richard Sardinha, Ron Spencer, Stephen Tappin, Joel Thomas, and Ben Thompson.

The designers intended the book for experienced players and Dungeons Masters who wanted something new, encouraging them to customize the game's rules. The designers did not want the third edition book to be like the original Unearthed Arcana mechanically, because according to Andy Collins: "Every book on the market looks like the original Unearthed Arcana. New classes, new spells, new magic items - that's the default "recipe" for a d20 product these days. We saw no need to do that with this book." Where the original Unearthed Arcana had simply expanded the rules and options of the core game, this 224-page supplement was aimed at providing an extensive list of variant rules and options to change the standard game itself. The volume of options added was intentionally excessive; according to the designers, a Dungeon Master who reads the book must be prepared to "Drink from the fire hose" and to think before using options that may radically imbalance the game. The book ends with a checklist of the included variants, preceded by a short chapter discussing ways of transitioning among multiple games using different rulesets (one of which explicitly emulates the "Eternal Champion" stories of Michael Moorcock).

== Dungeons & Dragons 5th edition ==
The Unearthed Arcana title was used for a semi-regular series of digital releases at the official D&D website that began in February 2015; the series presented new, work-in-progress content such as class archetypes, playable races, and rule variants, similar to the playtest process that preceded the release of 5th edition. Much of the information in Xanathar's Guide to Everything (2017) and Tasha's Cauldron of Everything (2020) was developed through the public Unearthed Arcana playtest. On the playtest subclasses developed for Tasha's Cauldron of Everything, Jeremy Crawford said "almost every single one made it into the game".

From January 2018 to August 2021, Unearthed Arcana content was generally added to the D&D Beyond toolsets approximately one week after it was released on the official D&D website. Once the playtest period was concluded for Unearthed Arcana content (whether it is published in a book or retired, as determined by Wizards of the Coast), it was archived on D&D Beyond; existing character sheets already using the content are able to continue doing so, but the archived playtest content can not be newly added to a character. All remaining Unearthed Arcana content was archived on August 12, 2021.

From August 2022 to November 2023, Unearthed Arcana articles featured One D&D playtest material with releases now exclusive to D&D Beyond in a PDF format. In August 2023, Crawford stated that since originally launching Unearthed Arcana they have "received more than 500,000 surveys from players based on their time spent with the" playtest content. Following the release of the 2024 revision of 5th Edition, Unearthed Arcana returned in December 2024 with playtest releases for this iteration of the game.

=== List of Unearthed Arcana ===
Title	Author(s)	Date	Pages	Notes
Eberron	Mike Mearls	February 2, 2015	6	New races including Changeling, Shifter (Beasthide, Cliffwalk, Longstride, Longtooth, Razorclaw, Wildhunt) and Warforged; Artificer Wizard; action points; and the Dragonmark feat.
When Armies Clash	Mike Mearls	March 2, 2015	9	Mass combat rules: stands, units, commanders and solos; terrain; the procedure of combat including action options, movement and damage; objectives; and victory points.
Modifying Classes	Rodney Thompson	April 6, 2015	9	Rules for modifying class options (e.g. spell-less Ranger) and creating new class options (e.g. Favoured Soul from the Sorcerer)
Waterborne Adventures	Mike Mearls	May 4, 2015	5	Minotaur race (Krynn variant), Mariner fighting style, Swashbuckler Rogue and Storm Sorcerer.
Variant Rules	Mike Mearls	June 8, 2015	3	Includes various variant rules: players make all roles; vitality; and custom alignments.
Psionics and the Mystic	Mike Mearls	July 6, 2015	10	Rules for the Awakened Mystic and psionics.
Modern Magic	Dan Helmick	August 3, 2015	9	City Domain Cleric, Ghost in the Machine Warlock (plus Arcane Gunslinger invocation), Technomancy Wizard, hacking tools and tech-inspired spells.
Ranger	Mike Mearls	September 9, 2015	4	Revised Ranger class with Guardian, Seeker and Stalker subclasses.
Prestige Classes and Rune Magic	Mike Mearls	October 5, 2015	6	Rune Scribe prestige class and rules for rune magic, including new runes.
Light, Dark, Underdark!	Mike Mearls	November 2, 2015	4	Ranger (Deep Stalker), Sorcerer (Shadow Sorcery), Warlock (The Undying Light)
That Old Black Magic	Mike Mearls	December 7, 2015	3	Tiefling (race variants), new spells
Kits of Old	Mike Mearls	January 4, 2016	4	Bard (College of Swords, College of Satire), Fighter (Cavalier, Scout)
Psionics and the Mystic – Take Two	Mike Mearls, Jeremy Crawford	February 1, 2016	10	Mystic
March 2016 Review	Mike Mearls, Chris Lindsay	March 7, 2016		
Gothic Heroes	Mike Mearls	April 4, 2016	3	Revenant (subrace), Fighter (Monster Hunter), Rogue (Inquisitive)
Feats	Mike Mearls, Jeremy Crawford	June 6, 2016	5	
Quick Characters	Mike Mearls	July 25, 2016	3	
The Faithful	Mike Mearls, Jeremy Crawford	August 1, 2016	3	Warlock (Pact of the Seeker), Wizard (Theurgy)
The Ranger, Revised	Mike Mearls	September 12, 2016	8	Revised Ranger class
Encounter Building	Mike Mearls	October 10, 2016	4	
Barbarian Primal Paths	Mike Mearls, Jeremy Crawford	November 7, 2016	3	Barbarian (Path of the Ancestral Guardian, Path of the Storm Herald, Path of the Zealot)
Bard: Bard Colleges	Mike Mearls, Jeremy Crawford	November 14, 2016	3	Bard (College of Glamour, College of Whispers)
Cleric: Divine Domains	Mike Mearls, Jeremy Crawford	November 21, 2016	3	Cleric (Domains of the Forge, the Grave, and Protection)
Druid Circles and Wild Shape	Mike Mearls, Jeremy Crawford	November 28, 2016	4	Druid (Circle of Dreams, Circle of the Shepard, Circle of Twilight), Wild Shape (variant rules)
Fighter: Martial Archetypes	Mike Mearls, Jeremy Crawford	December 5, 2016	4	Fighter (Arcane Archer, Knight, Samurai, and Sharpshooter)
Monk: Monastic Traditions	Mike Mearls, Jeremy Crawford	December 12, 2016	2	Monk (Way of the Kensei, Way of Tranquility)
Paladin: Sacred Oaths	Mike Mearls, Jeremy Crawford	December 19, 2016	3	Paladin (Oath of Conquest, Oath of Treachery)
Artificer	Mike Mearls, Jeremy Crawford	January 9, 2017	7	Artificer
Ranger and Rogue	Mike Mearls, Jeremy Crawford	January 16, 2017	3	Ranger (Horizon Walker, Primeval Guardian), Rogue (Scout)
Sorcerer	Mike Mearls, Jeremy Crawford	February 6, 2017	4	Sorcerer (Favored Soul, Phoenix Sorcery, Sea Sorcery, Stone Sorcery)
Warlock and Wizard	Mike Mearls, Jeremy Crawford	February 13, 2017	6	Warlock (Hexblade, the Raven Queen) and new Eldritch Invocations, Wizard (Lore Mastery)
Mass Combat	Mike Mearls, Jeremy Crawford	February 21, 2017	5	
Traps Revisited	Mike Mearls, Jeremy Crawford	February 27, 2017	13	
The Mystic Class	Mike Mearls, Jeremy Crawford	March 13, 2017	28	Mystic
Wizard Revisited	Mike Mearls, Jeremy Crawford	March 20, 2017	2	Wizard (Theurgy, War Magic)
A Trio of Subclasses	Mike Mearls, Jeremy Crawford	March 27, 2017	3	Monk (Way of the Drunken Master), Paladin (Oath of Redemption), Ranger (Monster Slayer)
Starter Spells	Robert J. Schwalb, Jeremy Crawford	April 3, 2017	5	New spells
Downtime	Mike Mearls, Jeremy Crawford	April 10, 2017	14	
Feats for Skills	Robert J. Schwalb, Jeremy Crawford	April 17, 2017	4	
Feats for Races	Robert J. Schwalb, Jeremy Crawford	April 24, 2017	4	
Revised Subclasses	Jeremy Crawford, Mike Mearls	May 1, 2017	6	Barbarian (Path of the Ancestral Guardian), Bard (College of Swords), Fighter (Arcane Archer), Monk (Way of the Kensei), and Sorcerer (Favored Soul)
Revised Class Options	Mike Mearls, Jeremy Crawford	June 5, 2017	7	Druid (Circle of the Shepherd), Fighter (Cavalier), Paladin (Oath of Conquest), and Warlock (Celestial; formerly known as the Undying Light)
Greyhawk Initiative	Mike Mearls	July 10, 2017	5	Alternate initiative rules
Three-Pillar Experience	Mike Mearls	August 7, 2017	2	Alternate XP rules
Race Options: Eladrin and Gith	Mike Mearls, Jeremy Crawford	September 11, 2017	3	Elf (Eladrin subrace), Gith (race)
Fiendish Options	Mike Mearls, Jeremy Crawford	October 9, 2017	8	Tiefling (subraces), Diabolical Cults
Elf Subraces	Mike Mearls, Jeremy Crawford	November 13, 2017	2	Elf (subraces)
Three Subclasses	Mike Mearls, Jeremy Crawford	January 8, 2018	4	Druid (Circle of Spores), Fighter (Brute), Wizard (School of Invention)
Into the Wild	Mike Mearls	February 12, 2018	5	Alternate exploration rules
Order Domain	Jeremy Crawford, Mike Mearls	April 9, 2018	2	Cleric (Order Domain)
Centaurs and Minotaurs	Jeremy Crawford, Mike Mearls, James Wyatt	May 14, 2018	2	Centaurs (race), Minotaurs (race)
Giant Soul Sorcerer	Mike Mearls, Jeremy Crawford	June 11, 2018	2	Sorcerer (Giant Soul)
Races of Eberron	Keith Baker, Jeremy Crawford, Mike Mearls, Ruty Rutenberg, Kate Welch	July 23, 2018	9	Changelings (race), Kalashtar (race), Shifters (race), Warforged (race)
Races of Ravnica	James Wyatt, Ari Levitch, Jeremy Crawford	August 13, 2018	5	Loxodon (race), Simic Hybrid (race), Vedalken (race), Viashino (race)
Dragonmarks	Keith Baker, Ruty Rutenberg, Ben Petrisor	September 10, 2018	9	Dragonmarks (subraces/variant races and feats)
Magic Items of Eberron	Keith Baker, Ruty Rutenberg, Ben Petrisor	October 8, 2018	4	New magic items for the Eberron setting
Of Ships and the Sea		November 12, 2018	9	New ship combat rules
Sidekicks	Jeremy Crawford, Ben Petrisor	December 17, 2018	6	New rules for sidekicks (NPC party members played by the Dungeon Master)
The Artificer Revisited	Jeremy Crawford, Keith Baker, Mike Mearls, Ben Petrisor, James Wyatt	February 28, 2019	10	Artificer (with Alchemist and Artillerist subclasses)
The Artificer Returns	Jeremy Crawford, Keith Baker, Mike Mearls, Ben Petrisor, James Wyatt	May 14, 2019	14	Artificer (with Alchemist, Archivist, Artillerist, and Battle Smith subclasses)
Barbarian and Monk	Ben Petrisor, Dan Dillon, F. Wesley Schneider	August 15, 2019	3	Barbarian (Path of the Wild Soul), Monk (Way of the Astral Self)
Sorcerer and Warlock	Dan Dillon, with Jeremy Crawford, Mike Mearls, Ben Petrisor, and F. Wesley Schneider	September 5, 2019	4	Sorcerer (Aberrant Mind), Warlock (the Lurker in the Deep)
Bard and Paladin	Ari Levitch, Ben Petrisor, and Jeremy Crawford, with Dan Dillon and F. Wesley Schneider	September 18, 2019	3	Bard (College of Eloquence), Paladin (Oath of Heroism)
Cleric, Druid, and Wizard	Dan Dillon, Jeremy Crawford, Ben Petrisor, with F. Wesley Schneider	October 3, 2019	5	Cleric (Twilight Domain), Druid (Circle of Wildfire), Wizard (Onomancy)
Fighter, Ranger, and Rogue	Ben Petrisor, Dan Dillon, Jeremy Crawford, with F. Wesley Schneider	October 17, 2019	5	Fighter (Rune Knight), Ranger (Swarmkeeper), Rogue (the Revived)
Class Feature Variants	Jeremy Crawford, Dan Dillon, and Ben Petrisor, with F. Wesley Schneider	November 4, 2019	13	New and updated features for all 12 character classes in the Player's Handbook.
Fighter, Rogue, Wizard	Jeremy Crawford, Dan Dillon, and Ben Petrisor, with F. Wesley Schneider	November 25, 2019	9	Fighter (Psychic Warrior), Rogue (Soulknife), Wizard (Psionics), psionics-themed spells and feats
2020: Subclasses, Part 1	Ben Petrisor, Dan Dillon, Bill Benham, Jeremy Crawford, F. Wesley Schneider	January 14, 2020	5	Barbarian (Path of the Beast), Monk (Way of Mercy), Paladin (Oath of the Watchers), Warlock (the Noble Genie)
2020: Subclasses, Part 2	Ben Petrisor, Dan Dillon, Jeremy Crawford, F. Wesley Schneider	February 6, 2020	5	Bard (College of Creation), Cleric (Unity Domain), Sorcerer (Clockwork Soul)
2020: Subclasses, Part 3	Ben Petrisor, Jeremy Crawford, Adam Lee, Dan Dillon, F. Wesley Schneider	February 24, 2020	6	Artificer (Armorer), Druid (Circle of the Stars), Ranger (Fey Wanderer)
2020: Spells and Magic Tattoos	Ben Petrisor, Dan Dillon, Jeremy Crawford	March 26, 2020	12	Spells that focus on summoning, magical tattoos
2020: Psionic Options Revisited	Jeremy Crawford and Dan Dillon, with Ben Petrisor, Taymoor Rehman, and F. Wesley Schneider	April 14, 2020	9	Fighter (Psi Knight; formerly known as the Psychic Warrior), Rogue (Soulknife), Sorcerer (Psionic Soul; formerly known as the Aberrant Mind), psionics-themed spells and feats
2020: Subclasses Revisited	Jeremy Crawford, Ben Petrisor, Dan Dillon, Taymoor Rehman	May 12, 2020	5	Rogue (Phantom; formerly known as the Revived), Warlock (The Genie; formerly known as the Noble Genie), Wizard (Order of Scribes; a reimagined version of the Archivist artificer)
2020: Feats	Taymoor Rehman, Jeremy Crawford, Ben Petrisor, Dan Dillon, Ari Levitch	July 13, 2020	3	16 new feats
2020: Subclasses, Part 4	Ben Petrisor, with Jeremy Crawford, Dan Dillon, and Taymoor Rehman	August 5, 2020	4	Bard (College of Spirits), Warlock (The Undead)
2020: Subclasses, Part 5	Dan Dillon, with Jeremy Crawford, Ben Petrisor, Taymoor Rehman, and James Wyatt	October 26, 2020	4	Monk (Way of the Ascendant Dragon), Ranger (Drakewarden)
2021: Gothic Lineages	F. Wesley Schneider, Ben Petrisor, and Jeremy Crawford, with input from the rest of the D&D design team	January 26, 2021	5	Race options (Lineages: Dhampir, Hexblood, Reborn)
2021: Folk of the Feywild	Taymoor Rehman, Ari Levitch, and Jeremy Crawford, with input from the rest of the D&D design team	March 11, 2021	3	Race options (Fairy, Hobgoblin of the Feywild, Owlfolk, Rabbitfolk)
2021: Draconic Options	Ben Petrisor, Taymoor Rehman, Dan Dillon, James Wyatt, and Jeremy Crawford	April 14, 2021	7	Races (3 variant Dragonborn (Chromatic, Metallic, Gem), Kobold (alternate version)), feats, and spells related to dragons
2021: Mages of Strixhaven	Makenzie De Armas, Dan Dillon, and Jeremy Crawford	June 8, 2021	9	Subclasses associated with each of the 5 colleges of Strixhaven: Mage of Lorehold (Bard, Warlock, Wizard); Mage of Prismari (Druid, Sorcerer, Wizard); Mage of Quandrix (Sorcerer, Wizard); Mage of Silverquill (Bard, Warlock, Wizard); Mage of Witherbloom (Druid, Warlock)
2021: Travelers of the Multiverse	Christopher Perkins and Jeremy Crawford	October 8, 2021	4	Races (Astral Elf [Humanoid], Autognome [Construct], Giff [Humanoid], Hadozee [Humanoid], Plasmoid [Ooze], & Thri-Kreen [Monstrosity])
2022: Heroes of Krynn	Ben Petrisor, F. Wesley Schneider, and Jeremy Crawford	March 8, 2022	6	Races (Kender [Humanoid]), Subclasses (Lunar Magic [Sorcerer]), Backgrounds (Knight of Solamnia, & Mage of High Sorcery), Feats (Adept of the Black Robes, Adept of the Red Robes, Adept of the White Robes, Divine Communications, Divinely Favored, Initiate of High Sorcery, Knight of the Crown, Knight of the Sword, Knight of the Rose, & Squire of Solamnia)
2022: Heroes of Krynn Revisited	Ben Petrisor, F. Wesley Schneider, and Jeremy Crawford	April 25, 2022	5	Revised Kender, revised Knight of Solamnia & Mage of High Sorcery backgrounds, and revised Dragonlance feats (Adept of the Black Robes, Adept of the Red Robes, Adept of the White Robes, Divinely Favored, Initiate of High Sorcery, Knight of the Crown, Knight of the Rose, Knight of the Sword, & Squire of Solamnia)
2022: Giant Options	Makenzie De Armas, James Wyatt, Ben Petrisor, and Jeremy Crawford	May 23, 2022	5	Barbarian, Druid, & Wizard subclass options & Feats
2022: Wonders of the Multiverse	Makenzie De Armas, Dan Dillon, Ben Petrisor, Jason Tondro, and Jeremy Crawford	July 18, 2022	12	Glitchling race, Cleric Fate Domain, backgrounds, feats and spells
One D&D
Unearthed Arcana 2022 - Character Origins	Jeremy Crawford, Christopher Perkins, Ray Winninger	August 18, 2022	21	Outlines playtest content for the then upcoming Player's Handbook (2024) such as player races, character backgrounds, starting languages, feats and a rules glossary.
Unearthed Arcana 2022 - Expert Classes	N/A	September 29, 2022	37	Outlines playtest content such as Expert Classes (Bard, Ranger, Rogue), feats, spells, and an updated rules glossary.
Unearthed Arcana 2022 - Cleric and Revised Species	N/A	December 1, 2022	26	Outlines playtest content such as the Cleric class, player species (Ardling, Dragonborn, and Goliath) and an updated rules glossary.
Unearthed Arcana 2023 - Player's Handbook: Druid and Paladin	N/A	February 23, 2023	29	Outlines playtest content such as the Druid and Paladin classes, revised feats, smite spells and an updated rules glossary.
Unearthed Arcana 2023 - Player's Handbook Playtest 5	N/A	April 26, 2023	50	Outlines playtest content such as the Barbarian, Fighter, Sorcerer, Warlock, and Wizard classes, new weapon options, new spells, epic boon feats, the weapon master feat, and an updated rules glossary.
Unearthed Arcana 2023 - Player's Handbook Playtest 6	N/A	June 29, 2023	77	Outlines playtest content such as the Bard, Cleric, Druid, Monk, Paladin, Ranger, and Rogue along with new spells, revised spells and revised feats; provides an updated rules glossary.
Unearthed Arcana 2023 - Player's Handbook Playtest 7	N/A	September 7, 2023	54	Outlines playtest content such as the Barbarian, Fighter, Sorcerer, Warlock, and Wizard along with revisions to weapons and spells (Arcane, Divine, and Primal spell lists have been removed); provides an updated rules glossary.
Unearthed Arcana 2023 - Bastions and Cantrips	N/A	October 5, 2023	23	Outlines playtest content such as revisions to Cantrips and the new Bastion system.
Unearthed Arcana 2023 - Player's Handbook Playtest 8	N/A	November 27, 2023	30	Outlines playtest content for the then upcoming Player's Handbook (2024) and provides an updated rules glossary.
2024 revision of 5th Edition
Unearthed Arcana 2024 - The Artificer	N/A	December 17, 2024	14	Revised Artificer with four revised subclasses (Alchemist, Armorer, Artillerist, and Battle Smith) using the Player's Handbook (2024) ruleset.
Unearthed Arcana 2025 - Forgotten Realms Subclasses	N/A	January 28, 2025	9	Revised subclasses for Cleric, Fighter, and Wizard; new subclasses for Bard, Paladin, Ranger, Rogue, and Sorcerer.
Unearthed Arcana 2025 - Eberron Updates	N/A	February 27, 2025	15	Revised Artificer with a new subclass; Dragonmarks as feats with a progression option.
Unearthed Arcana 2025 - Horror Subclasses	N/A	May 6, 2025	9	Revised subclasses for Bard, Cleric, Rogue, Sorcerer, and Warlock; new subclasses for Artificer and Ranger.
Unearthed Arcana 2025 - The Psion	N/A	May 27, 2025	13	New Psion class with four subclasses (Metamorph, Psi Warper, Psykinetic, and Telepath); new and revised psionic themed spells and feats.
Unearthed Arcana 2025 - Arcane Subclasses	N/A	June 26, 2025	11	Revised subclasses for Cleric, Fighter, Warlock and Wizard; new subclasses for Monk and Sorcerer.
Unearthed Arcana 2025 - Apocalyptic Subclasses	N/A	August 21, 2025	5	New subclasses for Druid, Fighter, Sorcerer, and Warlock.
Unearthed Arcana 2025 - Arcane Subclasses Update	N/A	September 18, 2025	10	Revised Unearthed Arcana subclasses for the Fighter, Monk, and Wizard.
Unearthed Arcana 2026 - Mystic Subclasses	N/A	January 15, 2026	6	New subclasses for the Monk, Paladin, Rogue, and Warlock.
Unearthed Arcana 2026 - Villainous Options	N/A	April 2, 2026	12	New subclasses for the Cleric, Druid, Fighter, and Sorcerer, as well as feats with a progression option to become a Lich or a Death Knight.
Unearthed Arcana 2026 - Villainous Options 2	N/A	April 23, 2026	5	New subclasses for the Barbarian, Monk and Warlock.

== Reception ==
Paul Cockburn reviewed the original Unearthed Arcana in issue 73 of White Dwarf magazine (January 1986), rating it 4 out of 10 overall. He summed up the book's contents by calling them "A rules extension package of reprints, most of which add very little of interest or value to anybody's game."

Scott Dollinger reviewed Unearthed Arcana for Different Worlds magazine and stated that "Unearthed Arcana is a well-constructed, 128-page hardback book that is filled with top-quality illustrations and very easy to read charts. The materials are all useful to both player and gamemaster and for the price, it's a real bargain."

Reaction to the Unearthed Arcana hardcover was often critical. According to Lawrence Schick, in his 1991 book Heroic Worlds, "Many players regard the new character classes introduced in this volume as overly powerful and out of line with those in the Player's Handbook."

William B. Haddon's review of the third edition Unearthed Arcana on RPGnet lauded the book's content while criticizing the interest level of the content as "very flat". He found the power level unbalanced for each of the new sub-systems introduced, and found little in the suggested rules that he wanted to use.

James Maliszewski for Black Gate in 2014 said "Unearthed Arcana was a game changer by being something I didn't want. Or perhaps I should say that it simply failed to be what I hoped it would be. Even now, I'm not entirely sure what it was that I hoped the book would be. I know only that I once loved D&D without ceasing and, by the time, Unearthed Arcana came out, I no longer did. It would take years before I loved it again with the same passion I did in those heady early days. It's unfair to lay the blame for that on Unearthed Arcana, even though I did for years afterwards."

Scott Taylor of Black Gate listed the Unearthed Arcana as #3 on the list of "Top 10 'Orange Spine' AD&D Hardcovers By Jeff Easley, saying "Truly one of the most iconic wizard images EVER! How many times has this been ripped off?"

Viktor Coble listed Unearthed Arcana as #10 on CBR's 2021 "D&D: 10 Best Supplemental Handbooks" list, stating that "If there is ever a supplemental guide to include in a player's library, it's any of the "Unearthed Arcana" editions. They're by far one of the most useful handbooks D&D ever puts out, and are rarely a regretted addition."

== Reviews ==
- Backstab #47
- Backstab #51 (as "Les Arcanes Exhumés")
- Dragão Brasil
- Realms of Fantasy
