= Tome and Blood =

Dungeons & Dragons rulebook

- Cover of Tome and Blood
- Author: Bruce R. Cordell, Skip Williams
- Genre: Role-playing game
- Publisher: Wizards of the Coast
- Publication date: July 2001
- Media type: Print (Trade Paperback)
- Pages: 96
- ISBN: 0-7869-1845-4
- OCLC: 47646058

Tome and Blood: A Guidebook to Wizards and Sorcerers is an optional rulebook for the 3rd edition of Dungeons & Dragons, and notable for its trade paperback format.

== Contents ==
The guidebook provides supplemental information for characters belonging to the Wizard and Sorcerer base classes. This book contained tips for creating and playing characters of the aforementioned class, as well as 15 prestige classes:

- Acolyte of the Skin
- Alienist
- Arcane Trickster
- Bladesinger
- Blood Magus
- Candle Caster
- Dragon Disciple
- Elemental Savant
- Fatespinner
- Mage of the Arcane Order
- Mindbender
- Pale Master
- Spellsword
- True Necromancer
- Wayfarer Guide

== Publication history ==
Tome and Blood was published in 2001 by Wizards of the Coast, and was designed by Bruce R. Cordell and Skip Williams. Cover art was by Todd Lockwood, with interior art by Wayne Reynolds.

The book was not updated to 3.5 Edition, although most of the prestige classes were later reintroduced in the 3.5 supplemental sourcebook Complete Arcane.

== Reception ==
The reviewer from Pyramid commented that "In some ways, the theme of Tome And Blood could be everything old is new again." The reviewer cited the example of the Arcane Order, originally found in the 2nd edition book The College of Wizardry, by Bruce R. Cordell.

== Reviews ==
- Backstab #33

== See also ==
- Defenders of the Faith
- Masters of the Wild
- Song and Silence
- Sword and Fist
