= Complete Mage =

Dungeons & Dragons rulebook

- Author: Skip Williams, Penny Williams, Ari Marmell and Kolja Raven Liquette
- Genre: Role-playing game
- Publisher: Wizards of the Coast
- Publication date: October 2006
- Media type: Print (Hardback)
- Pages: 160
- ISBN: 0-7869-3937-0

Complete Mage is a supplemental rule book for the 3.5 edition of the Dungeons & Dragons role-playing game. It is effectively the sequel to Complete Arcane.

== Contents ==
The book provides feats, prestige classes, and other options for characters interested in magic. Unlike Complete Arcane, Complete Mage has no new core classes, but it contains alternative class features for existing classes.

=== Advanced class features ===
Complete Mage adds 13 new alternative class features.

==== Arcane hunter ====
Rangers learn to track and hunt creatures of a certain type when choosing a favored enemy. Some rangers concern themselves less with what a creature is, and more with what it does. These rangers learn to identify signs of the arcane and make it their business to combat those who use arcane magic in opposition to their goals.

==== Arcane stunt ====
Every swashbuckler relies on her agility and quick wit to get her out of scrapes. Some take this a step further, learning magical tricks that boost their mobility or defense.

==== Armored mage ====
Rare is the fighter who has not envied the wizard's bag of magical tricks. Although even the most basic arcane spell remains beyond a fighter's abilities, those who aspire to such talents can, with practice, learn to cast simple arcane spells while wearing light armor. On its own, this alternative feature grants little benefit to a single-classed fighter; only in conjunction with one or more levels of sorcerer, wizard, or a similar arcane spellcasting class does this ability come into play.

==== Curse breaker ====
Most paladins use their divinely granted powers to combat diseases that plague their allies. Paladins with an interest in the arcane particularly those who battle necromancers sometimes prefer to learn to counteract the effects of magical curses.

==== Divine counterspell ====
Although the ability to turn undead is arguably a defining cleric characteristic, some clerics (and paladins) find that they can be even more effective crusaders by opposing evil spellcasters. The ability to negate an enemy spellcasters magic grants a character an unexpected edge.

==== Divine magician ====
Deities influence the world through the divine spells they grant their worshipers. Some clerics, however, choose to explore magical powers beyond those commonly provided by the gods. By giving up some of their divine power, these clerics gain access to spells normally beyond their abilities.

==== Elemental companion ====
Every druid reveres nature, but some pay more respect to the fundamental building blocks of the natural world than to its flora and fauna. By forgoing her bond with the animal kingdom, a druid can instead take on an elemental creature as her companion.

==== Focused specialist ====
Every wizard who calls himself a specialist takes pride in wielding his preferred form of magic. Those who are exceptionally pure of purpose take this specialization to an entirely new level, disdaining breadth of skill in favor of even greater focus.

==== Soulwarp strike ====
The traditional monk seeks balance in body, mind, and soul, and through this equilibrium gains various combat talents. A monk who learns the secret of the soulwarp strike masters an arcane talent of necromancy that infects her enemy's ki, producing an effect akin to terrible sickness.

==== Spell reflection ====
Many masters of stealth share the signature talent to avoid explosive blasts of magical energy. It takes only a little training, however, to twist this defensive flair into the ability to reflect magical attacks back upon their creator.

==== Spell sense ====
Most barbarians and rogues have a preternatural awareness of danger, whether the threat of a nearby invisible attacker or the hidden peril of a spear trap. Some, however, fine-tune this ability to focus on magical attacks, granting them the ability to dodge the orbs, rays, and eldritch blasts of their enemies.

==== Spellbreaker song ====
Bards pride themselves on being masters of language and sound. A rare few learn to use their voices to interfere with enemy spellcasters, twisting word and sound to defeat spells before they are cast.

==== Stalwart sorcerer ====
Most sorcerers hide behind walls of steel, slinging spells at enemies safely distant. They have no patience for such cowards and prefer to be near the front line. The breadth of magical knowledge might not compare with those craven weaklings, but they are proud to dive into the fray alongside the fighter.

== Publication history ==
Complete Mage was written by Skip Williams, Penny Williams, Ari Marmell, and Kolja Raven Liquette, and was published in October 2006. Cover art was by Matt Cavotta, and interior art is by Miguel Coimbra, Eric Deschamps, Wayne England, Carl Frank, Randy Gallegos, Ralph Horsley, Jim Nelson, Eric Polak, Mike Schley, Ron Spencer, Anne Stokes, Arnie Swekel, Eva Widermann, and Kieran Yanner.

Andy Collins explains how this book relates to Complete Arcane: "Both books cover similar topics--how to enhance your character's magical (arcane) abilities. That said, they don't follow exactly the same format (though both contain spells, feats, and prestige classes as one might expect), so the range of subject matter varies a bit. Complete Mage, for example, doesn't introduce new classes like Complete Arcane did, though it does provide some new options (feats, spells, and so on) for the new classes from Complete Arcane."

Shannon Appelcline identified Complete Mage as one of the books that "changed the way that D&D worked in dramatic ways" and may have influenced the design of 4th edition D&D.

== Reception ==
Viktor Coble listed the entire Complete series - including Complete Adventurer, Complete Divine, Complete Warrior, Complete Arcane, Complete Champion, and Complete Mage - as #9 on CBR's 2021 "D&D: 10 Best Supplemental Handbooks" list, stating that "These books took a deep dive into specific class types. They expanded on what it meant to be that kind of class, gave informative prestige classes, extra abilities, and even new concepts for playing them."
