= David Noonan (game designer) =

Writer and editor of fantasy roleplaying games

- Born: United States
- Occupation(s): Writer, designer, editor
- Title: Former Lead Writer for TERA at En Masse Entertainment

David Noonan is an author of several products and articles for the Dungeons & Dragons fantasy role-playing game from Wizards of the Coast.

== Career ==
=== Role-playing games ===
David Noonan began his career with Wizards of the Coast in 1998. He contributed to the design of the three core books for the third edition of Dungeons & Dragons. For the new Dungeon Master's Guide, he developed the treasure tables, based on guidance from Monte Cook, and worked on the non-player characters that appear in the book's second chapter. Noonan also contributed some prestige classes to Sword and Fist, as well as designing a large part of Song and Silence, and spent five months on editing and design work for the third edition Manual of the Planes.

Noonan, Andy Collins, Mike Mearls, and Jesse Decker were part of Rob Heinsoo's "Flywheel" design team for fourth edition Dungeons & Dragons, and did the final concept work from May 2006 to September 2006, before the first books for the edition were written and playtested. Noonan was one of the eVoices of Wizards on the D&D podcast.

On December 2, 2008, Noonan was laid off from his employment with Wizards of the Coast. and wrote three articles updating the Dark Sun campaign setting for the third edition in Dungeon Magazine.

=== MMORPGs ===
After Wizards of the Coast, Noonan joined NCsoft West to work on the westernization for Aion. In 2010, after Aion, he went to En Masse Entertainment to assume the role of Lead Writer for the creative writing team working on TERA.

== Works ==
Noonan has multiple 3rd edition Dungeons & Dragons design and editing credits including:

- Hero Builder's Guidebook (2000)
- Sword and Fist (2001)
- Song and Silence (2001)
- Return to the Temple of Elemental Evil (2001)
- Psionics Handbook (2001), Manual of the Planes (2001)
- Deep Horizon (2001)
- Stronghold Builder's Guidebook (2002)
- Epic Level Handbook (2002)
- Deities and Demigods (2002)
- Book of Vile Darkness (2002)
- 3rd edition Dungeon Master's Guide (2003)
- 3rd edition Monster Manual (2003)
- 3rd edition Player's Handbook (2003)
- Races of Faerûn (Forgotten Realms) (2003)
- 3.5 revised Dungeon Master's Guide (2003)
- 3.5 revised Monster Manual (2003)
- 3.5 revised Player's Handbook (2003)
- Complete Warrior (2003)
- Arms and Equipment Guide (2003)
- Whispers of the Vampire's Blade (Eberron) (2004),
- Unearthed Arcana (2004)
- Races of Stone (2004)
- Planar Handbook (2004)
- Frostburn (2004)
- Monster Manual III (2004)
- Complete Divine (2004)
- Stormwrack (2005)
- Sandstorm (2005)
- Races of the Wild (2005)
- Heroes of Battle (2005)
- Five Nations (Eberron) (2005)
- Explorer's Handbook (Eberron) (2005)
- Dungeon Master's Guide II (2005)
- Complete Adventurer (2005)
- Tome of Magic: Pact, Shadow, and Truename Magic (2006)
- Player's Handbook II (2006)

He worked on d20 Past and d20 Future for the d20 Modern system, and some writing for the Magic: The Gathering, 7th edition (2001). Noonan also worked on the Kingdoms of Kalamar Player's Guide (2002) for Kenzer and Company, and The Shackled City Adventure Path (2005) for Paizo Publishing.

=== Magazine works ===
- Noonan, David. "Beings of Power: Four Gods of Greyhawk." Dragon #294. Bellevue, WA: Paizo Publishing, 2002.
- -----. "Test of the Smoking Eye." Dungeon #107. Bellevue, WA: Paizo Publishing, 2004.
- Noonan, David (2004). ""Last Stand At Outpost Three" "The Dark Sun DMs Guild" "Dark Sun Monster Supplement"". Dungeon. No. 110. Bellevue, Washington: Paizo Publishing.
- -----. "Zenith Trajectory." Dungeon #102. Bellevue, WA: Paizo Publishing, 2003.
