= Warlock (Dungeons & Dragons) =

Character class in Dungeons & Dragons

- Dungeons & Dragons character class

Editions
- Standard class: 4th; 5th; 5.5e
- Alternate class: v3.5

Publication history
- First appearance: Complete Arcane
- Source books: Complete Arcane; Player's Handbook (2008, 2014, 2024)

Inspiration
- Mythological origins: Warlock

Grouping
- 4E powersource: Arcane
- 4E role: Striker

The warlock is a character class in the Dungeons & Dragons fantasy role-playing game. It was introduced as a non-core base class who practice arcane magic in the supplemental book Complete Arcane for the 3.5 edition of Dungeons & Dragons. In 4th and 5th edition, the warlock is a core class.

== Publication history ==
=== Dungeons & Dragons 3rd edition ===
Warlocks were a new addition to Dungeons & Dragons that were introduced in the 3.5 Edition source book Complete Arcane (2004). Warlocks in this edition received their abilities through the influence of some supernatural being such as a demon or fey. They are either born with these powers or receive them through a fell pact, which turns their soul into a dark font of eldritch powers. Warlocks do not cast spells, but instead use spell-like abilities called "invocations", which represent the tapping of the power granted to the warlock. The most important of these abilities is the "eldritch blast" which is the warlock's main offensive ability, firing a blast of magical energy at the target.

The major difference that warlocks have from all other Dungeons & Dragons 3rd edition magic users is their ability to use their invocations "at will," without a limit on the number of times an invocation can be cast. In contrast, Vancian magic users, such as the wizard, cast a set number of spells every day from a wider selection of spells than a warlock. Shannon Appelcline, author of Designers & Dragons, highlighted that this warlock at will mechanic was "presaging the at-will spellcasting of 4e". Richard Baker, author of Complete Arcane, said:

The warlock's biggest advantage is no real limit on the number of times per day he can use his powers. (He's got a couple of powers with limited uses per day, but 90 percent of his powers have no such restriction.) The thinking here is that in most D&D games, your characters are probably going to be in only 15 to 20 rounds of combat between rests and spell recoveries. So after your spellcaster has a total daily spell allocation of 20 spells or more (say, around 5th level), his real limit is the number of actions he gets per day — the number of specific opportunities he has to cast a spell. So the warlock is still bound to the same ultimate limit that any moderate-level wizard deals with. Now, it's pretty useful to never run out of attack options, and the warlock can blast you over and over again with his eldritch blast. So what he gives up is spell versatility. The warlock knows only a handful of different tricks. On the bright side, the tricks are all spooky, creepy, and oozing with flavor.

=== Dungeons & Dragons 4th edition ===
In 4th Edition, the warlock was included as one of the core classes introduced in the Player's Handbook (2008). In this edition, the warlock's powers are known as spells, and use the standard power system. The warlock has many different unique abilities, though a warlock's trademark ability is still Eldritch Blast. They can also deliver various effects through Warlock's Curse. The Warlock's other class features make them more accurate at ranged attacks when no ally is closer to their target and allow them to gain concealment whenever they move a sufficient distance. Almost all of the warlock's attack powers depend on charisma or constitution for accuracy and damage, with some powers gaining bonuses from intelligence.

The specific source of the warlock's power is defined as a Pact (with a non-divine supernatural entity or power), which affects at-will power options and makes certain powers more effective and provides a pact boon, an effect which is triggered whenever a cursed enemy is killed or incapacitated. There are multiple Pact options included in various source books:

Pact name	Description
The Star Pact	It is made with an entity from the Far Realm or a star located near it, which grants powers of grand revelations from the stars that madden foes. Star Pact warlocks can use either Constitution or Charisma for their attacks. There are also Star Pact spells which use Intelligence for attack rolls.
The Fey Pact	Forged with an amoral power of the Feywild, the user is given access to both wondrous and dangerous spells of the Faerie realm. Fey Pact warlocks use Charisma for their attacks.
The Infernal Pact	It represents an agreement with a devil of the Nine Hells, giving one powers of hellish and demonic proportions. Infernal Pact warlocks use Constitution for their attacks.
The Dark Pact	It is made with powerful residents of the Underdark and the Abyss, which grants spells of plagues, illness and disease. This was presented in the Forgotten Realms Player's Guide (2008). Dark Pact warlocks use Charisma for their attacks.
The Vestige Pact	The pact, presented in the Arcane Power (2009) supplement, represents an agreement with vestiges, arcane "echoes" of once-great individuals and powers, allowing the Warlock to act as a spirit medium through which entities manifest their powers.
The Sorcerer-King Pact	This pact was included in the Dark Sun Campaign Setting (2010). It is made with a Sorcerer-King of Athas, giving access to abilities that destroy and defile. Warlocks with the Sorcerer-King Pact can use either Constitution or Charisma for their attacks.
The Gloom Pact	It is made with creatures of the Shadowfell, which gives the ability to connect with the shadows and use them to bind foes to them.
The Elemental Pact	It allows Warlocks to draw their power from ancient Primordials in the Elemental Chaos, which in turn gives them chaotic elemental powers.

Tieflings and gnomes have racial bonuses to both intelligence and charisma (two key warlock attributes). In 4th edition a warlock's role is striker, meaning they are designed to deal heavy damage while avoiding retaliation. Warlocks also have many exotic powers that have bonus effects; such as Eyebite which makes the warlock invisible for one turn if it hits. Many of the Warlock's powers allow them to move as part of an attack or to move in an unusual manner, such as flight or teleportation.

==== Dungeons & Dragons Essentials ====
The Essentials rulebook Heroes of the Forgotten Kingdoms presented an alternate version of the Warlock, known as the Hexblade. It was "a new take on the magic-powered warrior from Complete Warrior (2003)". The later rulebook Player's Option: Heroes of Shadow introduced another Warlock variant, the Binder. Both of these variants were adaptations of classes introduced in the 3.5 edition of the game.

=== Dungeons & Dragons 5th edition ===
The warlock was included as a character class in the 5th edition Player's Handbook. It is a magic-using class with a combination of spells and Eldritch Invocations granted by the warlock's patron and the type of pact the warlock makes with the patron. The warlock uses charisma as its spellcasting ability. It is structured so that its spell slots and spells known are limited, but the slots renew after every short rest (unlike most other magic-using classes, which require a long rest), and all spells are always cast at the highest slot level to which the warlock has access. These spells are supplemented with invocations that provide additional abilities. Xanathar's Guide to Everything added 14 new invocation options, with a focus on higher level play and building off of other class features. Tasha's Cauldron of Everything also added 8 new Eldritch Invocations along with a new Pact Boon described below.

Patron	Sourcebook	Description	Ref.
The Archfey	Player's Handbook	Warlocks with a patron of the Archfey make pacts with powerful lords of Faerie, wild incarnations of the forces of nature, to gain their power.	
The Fiend	Player's Handbook	Those with the Fiend patron make deals and bargains with infernal powers such as Demon Lords and Princes of Hell for magic.	
The Great Old One	Player's Handbook	Those with the Great Old One patron draw their magical power from the Far Realm, strange, dark gods of entropy such as Tharizdun, or even eldritch alien beings, and are often on the verge of insanity.	
The Undying	Sword Coast Adventurer's Guide	Drawing their powers from pacts with powerful immortals like Iuz the Dread or the lich-queen Vol	
The Celestial	Xanathar's Guide to Everything	A pact is forged with a being connected to the Upper Planes such as a unicorn or solar.	
The Hexblade	Xanathar's Guide to Everything	The patron is a mysterious force from the Shadowfell (possibly the Raven Queen) that creates sentient magic weapons.	
The Fathomless	Tasha's Cauldron of Everything	A pact with entities of the deep sea.	
The Genie	Tasha's Cauldron of Everything	A pact with a powerful elemental genie.	
The Undead	Van Richten's Guide to Ravenloft	A pact forged with a undead creature such as the ancient vampire Strahd von Zarovich.	

Three options for its type of pact are presented in the Player's Handbook. Pact of the Chain allows the warlock to summon a familiar that exceeds the normal boundaries of the Find Familiar spell, Pact of the Tome grants the warlock a Book of Shadows containing additional spells (rituals and cantrips from any class), Pact of the Blade allows the warlock to conjure a magical weapon for combat. Pact of the Talisman, introduced in Tasha's Cauldron of Everything, gives the warlock a talisman that boosts either the warlock themselves or those they give it to.

== Other media ==
- Warlocks (3.5 edition) are featured in the Neverwinter Nights 2 video game from Obsidian Entertainment.
- The Warlock class is offered in the MMO computer game Dungeons & Dragons Online.
- The warlock class is a class in the D&D MMO Neverwinter, based on the 4th edition version.

== Reception ==
On the introduction of a new character class in the 3.5 Edition, Kevin Kulp, game designer and admin for EN World, wrote: "There was great furor about the warlock when the class was released, with impassioned (and sometimes a little bit frothing) concern that the introduction of at-will spellcasting would prove to be dramatically overpowered. Nevertheless, it was a significant step away from Vancian magic and the creation of a fun, playable class that had a fairly low learning curve for newer players. The warlock managed to combine fun new mechanics with superb flavor, something that's not particularly easy".

Shannon Appelcline, author of Designers & Dragons, highlighted that it was surprising to see the warlock as a core character class in the introduction of 4th Edition when it "hadn't been a core part of the game previously" and that there was some controversy that classic core classes, such as assassin, bard, and druid, were not included in the Player's Handbook (2008) to make room for the newer classes. Timothy Morton, in the book Dungeons and Dragons and Philosophy: Raiding the Temple of Wisdom, highlighted the downsides of the 4th Edition magic system and wrote "though this mechanical approach ensures that the results remain balanced with actions of other characters, the lack of variance and extreme consistency of results seemed problematic. [...] The Warlock, too, rubs us the wrong way. Shouldn't people who make pacts with unnatural and inhuman creatures from beyond feel slightly different from other characters in the 'Striker' role of direct damage dealing characters? [...] Ludological treatment would naturalize the unnatural within the game world or the minds of the players, thus destroying the horror and mystery that makes them desirable for inclusion within a role-playing game [...]. Why else would a 4e Warlock not seem all that different in combat from any other class?".

Screen Rant rated the warlock class as the 7th most powerful class of the base 12 character classes in the 5th edition.

The Gamer rated the 5th edition warlock subclass Celestial Patron as the 7th most awesome subclass out of the 32 new character options in Xanathar’s Guide to Everything.

Gus Wezerek, for FiveThirtyEight, reported that of the 5th edition "class and race combinations per 100,000 characters that players created on D&D Beyond from" August 15 to September 15, 2017, warlocks were the 8th most created at 8,711 total. Tiefling (2,188) was the most common racial combination followed by human (1,714) and then half-elf (1,401).
