= Masters of the Wild =

Dungeons & Dragons rulebook

Masters of the Wild: A Guidebook to Barbarians, Druids, and Rangers
- Cover of Masters of the Wild
- Author: David Eckelberry, Mike Selinker
- Genre: Role-playing game
- Publisher: Wizards of the Coast
- Publication date: February 2002
- Media type: Print (Trade Paperback)
- Pages: 96
- ISBN: 0-7869-2653-8
- OCLC: 49230540

Masters of the Wild: A Guidebook to Barbarians, Druids, and Rangers is an optional rulebook for the 3rd edition of Dungeons & Dragons, and notable for its trade paperback format.

== Contents ==
The guidebook provides supplemental information for characters belonging to the Druid, Ranger, and Barbarian base classes. This book introduced Natural Feats, which were still used in version 3.5. This book also contained tips for creating and playing characters of the aforementioned class, as well as several prestige classes.

== Publication history ==
Masters of the Wild was written by David Eckelberry and Mike Selinker and published in February 2002 by Wizards of the Coast. Cover art was by Jeff Easley, with interior art by Dennis Cramer, David Day, and Wayne Reynolds.

According to Eckelberry: "we looked at much of the previously published material on the "nature classes," but spent more time examining how the subjects of this book work in the new D&D. Since we had a bit more time post-release of the new edition of D&D than the other books in this series, we were able to listen to people we gamed with and to fans we met online and at conventions. They had a lot of things to say about what we'd be dealing with in Masters of the Wild."

It was not updated to 3.5 Edition, although most of the prestige classes were reintroduced in the 3.5 supplemental sourcebook Complete Divine.

== Reviews ==
- Backstab #43 (as "Les maîtres de la nature")

== See also ==
- Defenders of the Faith
- Song and Silence
- Sword and Fist
- Tome and Blood
