= Song and Silence =

2001 optional rulebook for 3rd edition Dungeons & Dragons

Song and Silence: A Guidebook to Bards and Rogues
- cover of Song and Silence
- Author: David Noonan and John D. Rateliff
- Genre: Role-playing game
- Publisher: Wizards of the Coast
- Publication date: December 2001
- Media type: Print (Trade Paperback)
- Pages: 96
- ISBN: 0-7869-1857-8
- OCLC: 48643912

Song and Silence: A Guidebook to Rogues and Bards is an optional rulebook for the 3rd edition of Dungeons & Dragons, and notable for its trade paperback format.

== Contents ==
The Song and Silence guidebook provides supplemental information for characters belonging to the Rogue and Bard base classes. This book contained tips for creating and playing characters of the aforementioned class, as well as a large number of prestige classes.

== Publication history ==
This book was written by David Noonan and John D. Rateliff and published in 2001 by Wizards of the Coast. Cover art was by Todd Lockwood, with interior art by David Roach and Wayne Reynolds.

Although it was not updated to 3.5 Edition, most of the prestige classes were reintroduced in the 3.5 supplemental source book Complete Adventurer, and a few in Complete Arcane.

== Reception ==
The reviewer from Pyramid noted the prestige classes in the book, and felt that it offered "some jim-dandies in this one", including the thief-acrobat, and the Fang of Lolth, "which starts with the assumption that a PC tries to access an artifact not meant for humanoids with a Use Magic Device roll. Hijinks ensue." The reviewer continued: "The rest of the prestige classes, while they are interesting and fulfill crucial roles, do not make stretch the genre my motor run and the way that the Fang of Lolth does. Yes, the crime-fighting Vigilante, the Robin Hood-ish Outlaw of the Crimson Road, and the swashbuckly Dread Pirate do exactly what a prestige class is meant to do: help to define a setting."

== Reviews ==
- Backstab #37

== See also ==
- Defenders of the Faith
- Masters of the Wild
- Sword and Fist
- Tome and Blood
