= Defenders of the Faith (Dungeons & Dragons) =

Dungeons & Dragons rulebook

- Cover of Defenders of the Faith
- Author: Rich Redman, James Wyatt
- Genre: Role-playing game
- Publisher: Wizards of the Coast
- Publication date: May 2001
- Media type: Print (Trade Paperback)
- Pages: 96
- ISBN: 0-7869-1840-3

Defenders of the Faith: A Guidebook to Clerics and Paladins is an optional rulebook for the 3rd edition of Dungeons & Dragons, and notable for its trade paperback format.

== Contents ==
The guidebook provides supplemental information for characters belonging to the Cleric and Paladin base classes. This book introduced Divine Feats, which were also used in version 3.5. This book also contained tips for creating and playing characters of the aforementioned classes, as well as several prestige classes.

== Publication history ==
The book was designed by Rich Redman and James Wyatt, and was published in 2001 by Wizards of the Coast. Cover art was by Brom, with interior art by Dennis Cramer.

Although it was not updated to 3.5 Edition, most of the book's prestige classes were reintroduced in the 3.5 supplemental sourcebook Complete Divine.

== Reception ==
The reviewer from Pyramid found the advice on effectively playing clerics and paladins useful, even if it "rarely goes beyond the basics information", and found the section on special paladin mounts to be one of the most interesting areas.

== Reviews ==
- Backstab #31
- Backstab #38 (as "Les Gardiens de la Foi")
- Coleção Dragão Brasil
- Realms of Fantasy

== See also ==
- Masters of the Wild
- Song and Silence
- Sword and Fist
- Tome and Blood
