= Complete Adventurer =

2005 role-playing game supplement

- Cover of Complete Adventurer
- Author: Jesse Decker
- Genre: Role-playing game
- Publisher: Wizards of the Coast
- Publication date: February 5, 2005
- Media type: Print (Hardback)
- Pages: 192
- ISBN: 9780786936519

Complete Adventurer is a supplemental hard-cover rulebook for the 3.5 edition of the Dungeons & Dragons game system published by Wizards of the Coast.

== Contents ==
It focuses on the skill based character classes of D&D, replacing and expanding upon an earlier soft-cover rulebook entitled Song and Silence. It also provides a catchall for anything that doesn't fit into Complete Arcane, Complete Divine, Complete Warrior, or Complete Psionic. It presents additional base classes, prestige classes, and feats.

=== New classes ===
Complete Adventurer introduces three new character classes to D&D 3.5. These classes are strongly related to the rogue class, and are highly skill based. The classes added are Ninja, Scout and Spellthief.

==== Ninja ====
The ninja class represents the standard image of a stealthy fighter. A ninja can come unseen, attack quickly but furiously, then leave unseen. The ninja excels at quick, powerful attacks but lacks the combat stamina of other classes such as monks and fighters.

==== Scout ====
A scout is a bit like a rogue of the wilderness. The scout is an expert at tracking, scouting enemy positions, and finding their way through familiar and unfamiliar landscapes. A scout has a mix of rogue and ranger traits, as well as some unique to them.

==== Spellthief ====
The spellthief has the ability to make a rogue's sneak attack, but instead of inflicting damage, can steal a spell from their opponent. That is, the victim can no longer cast their memorized spell for that day, while the spellthief can cast it - just as it was memorized. At higher levels the spellthief can even steal spell-like abilities from monsters.

=== New prestige classes ===
Complete Adventurer introduces a number of prestige classes which are primarily suited for rogues, bards, and the new classes introduced in the book. In addition there are a few other prestige classes which don't seem to fit the theme, but appear here because they did not fit in any of the other books in the Complete series.

The prestige classes include the Animal Lord, Beastmaster, Exemplar, Ollam, Dungeon Delver, Daggerspell Mage, Daggerspell Shaper, Nightsong Enforcer, Nightsong Infiltraitor, Fochlucan lyrist, maester (a magic item crafter), tempest, wild plains outrider, bloodhound and vigilante.

=== New uses for skills ===
The book details a number of new uses for skills, since its focus is on skill based characters. The book details new ways to use skills, as well as how to extend skills, use skills untrained that you normally couldn't, or make a skill roll harder for more reward.

=== Feats ===
Complete Adventurer also details a large number of new feats. Many of these feats are appropriate for bards and rogues. There are also a number of feats which were created to support Spellthieves, Scouts, and Ninjas. Finally, there are a few miscellaneous feats, which round out the book.

=== Equipment ===
Complete Adventurer also adds a large number tools equipment. This focuses on special types of items which would be particularly interesting to the skill based character classes such as alchemical items which focus on increasing skills for a few rounds.

=== Organizations ===
The final section of the book looks at organizations, a subject that has not appeared much in any 3rd or 3.5 book. Organizations are covered in much greater detail in Player's Handbook II.

== Publication history ==
Complete Adventurer was written by Jesse Decker and published in January 2005. Cover art is by Matt Cavotta, with interior art by Steve Belledin, Mitch Cotie, Ed Cox, Steve Ellis, Wayne England, David Hudnut, Jeremy Jarvis, Doug Kovacs, Chuck Lukacs, Jeff Miracola, Monte Moore, William O'Connor, Michael Phillippi, Ron Spencer, and Franz Vohwinkel.

Jesse Decker explained his approach to the book: "I really like to start writing on Day One of a project, so I always do outlining before my official design time begins. I started writing an outline for Complete Adventurer about three weeks before I actually began writing. With Complete Adventurer, I built the outline based on the structures of earlier Complete books and the assignment from the design manager that was something like: Create three base classes, a fair number of prestige classes, and 'do a lot with skills.'"

== Reception ==
Viktor Coble listed the entire Complete series - including Complete Adventurer, Complete Divine, Complete Warrior, Complete Arcane, Complete Champion, and Complete Mage - as #9 on CBR's 2021 "D&D: 10 Best Supplemental Handbooks" list, stating that "These books took a deep dive into specific class types. They expanded on what it meant to be that kind of class, gave informative prestige classes, extra abilities, and even new concepts for playing them."

== Reviews ==
- Coleção Dragon Slayer
- Coleção Dragon Slayer
