= Sword and Fist =

Dungeons & Dragons rulebook

Sword and Fist: A Guidebook to Fighters and Monks
- cover of Sword and Fist
- Author: Jason Carl
- Genre: Role-playing game
- Publisher: Wizards of the Coast
- Publication date: January 2001
- Media type: Print (Trade Paperback)
- Pages: 96
- ISBN: 0-7869-1829-2
- OCLC: 46475956

Sword and Fist: A Guidebook to Fighters and Monks is an optional rulebook for the 3rd edition of Dungeons & Dragons, written by Jason Carl and published in trade paperback format.

== Contents ==
Sword and Fist is a guidebook which provides supplemental information for characters belonging to the Fighter and Monk base classes. This book contained tips for creating and playing characters of the aforementioned class, as well as a large number of prestige classes, most of which have been reintroduced in the 3.5 supplemental sourcebook Complete Warrior.

=== Chapter 1 - Feats and Skills ===
This chapter gives descriptions of 31 new martial-related feats (such as Circle Kick and Rapid Reload) and 6 new knowledge-based skills (such as Literature and Mathematics). Several standard skills are also clarified to include new uses.

=== Chapter 2 - Prestige Classes ===
This chapter gives descriptions and advancement information for the following prestige classes:

- Cavalier
- Devoted Defender
- Drunken Master
- Duelist
- Fist of Hextor
- Ghostwalker
- Gladiator
- Halfling Outrider
- Knight Protector of the Great Kingdom
- Lasher
- Master of Chains
- Master Samurai
- Ninja of the Crescent Moon
- Order of the Bow Initiate
- Ravager
- Red Avenger
- Tribal Protector
- Warmaster
- Weapon Master

=== Chapter 3 - Worldly Matters ===
This chapter discusses means of smoothly incorporating Fighters and Monks into the world around them. It also contains histories for several martial organizations that can be added to a campaign setting.

=== Chapter 4 - The Game within the Game ===
This chapter contains tips on playing a martial class or prestige class and possible strategies and tactics to succeed in a campaign. Rules for monstrous Fighters and Monks are also given in this chapter, including rules for dealing with multiple limbs, flight, and other non-humanoid physical traits.

=== Chapter 5 - Tools of the Trade ===
This chapter introduces new exotic weapons, magic items, and vehicles. Towers, keeps, and castles for martial characters are also discussed, including the Elven Canopy Tower and the Dwarven Plateau Castle.

== Publication history ==
Sword and Fist was designed by Jason Carl. David Noonan contributed some prestige classes to the book. The book was published in 2001 by Wizards of the Coast. Cover art was by Jeff Easley, with interior art by Dennis Cramer.

== Reception ==
The reviewer from Pyramid stated that "The Complete Fighter's Handbook [...] set the stage for kits, and was the prototype for the entire Complete series. History repeats itself as the first class support book for third edition, Sword and Fist, focuses on Fighters and Monks."

== Reviews ==
- Backstab #28
- Dragão Brasil
- Realms of Fantasy

== See also ==
- Defenders of the Faith
- Masters of the Wild
- Song and Silence
- Tome and Blood
