= Magic of Faerûn =

Tabletop role-playing game supplement

- Genre: Role-playing game
- Publisher: Wizards of the Coast
- Media type: Print

Magic of Faerûn is an accessory for the fictional Forgotten Realms campaign setting for the 3rd edition of the Dungeons & Dragons fantasy role-playing game.

== Contents ==
This 192-page book begins with a one-page introduction written from the perspective of the fictional character Khelben "Blackstaff" Arunsun.

Chapter 1: Understanding Magic, on pages 4–11, describes the nature of magic in the Forgotten Realms, including the deities who most represent magic: Mystryl, Mystra, and Midnight, Azuth, Savras, Shar, and Velsharoon. This chapter also defines the terminology of magic, and explains the Weave—the barrier and the gate between raw magic and the world.

Chapter 2: Magic Variants, on pages 12–19, presents several forms of magic beyond the standard types, including elemental magic, elven high magic, gem magic, the mageduel, moonfire, rune magic, spellfire, and spellpools.

Chapter 3: Practitioners of Magic, on pages 20–41, gives information in increasing a player character's abilities, including new skills and feats, and ten new prestige classes.

Chapter 4: Places of Power, on pages 42–67, describes exotic places to explore, including natural sites (mystic maelstroms, sparks, fey mounds, boomshroom patches, doom pits), magically enhanced sites (crossroads and backroads, mythals), nature venerated (ranger guilds, druidic circles), places of prayer (destinations of pilgrimage, monasteries, shrines, small chapels, rural churches, mid-sized churches, city churches, large or fortified cathedrals), bastions of the arcane (bardic colleges, wizard's guilds, mage fairs), and the magic item trade (the open market, specialty shops, the black market, trade wizards, antimagic organizations).

Chapter 5: Spells, on pages 68–135, contains a spell list for several spellcasting classes, and presents over 130 magic spells.

Chapter 6: Magic Items, on pages 136-181, presents hundreds of magic items, as well as sections on spellbooks, creating magic items, and extraordinary natural items.

Chapter 7: Creatures, on pages 182-190, present statistics for six monsters.

Lastly, pages 190-191 are an index to the topics in this book.

== Publication history ==
The book was published in August 2001, and was written by Sean K. Reynolds, Duane Maxwell, and Angel Leigh McCoy. Cover art was by Justin Sweet and interior art by Carlo Arellano, Ted Beargeon, Carl Critchlow, Michael Dubisch, and Brian Snoddy.

== Reception ==
The reviewer from Pyramid felt that the "meat of the book for some would be chapter three where new feats and prestige classes are detailed" but noted that there was some "duplicate creep" of content from books that were still available.

In a review for RPGnet, Alan D. Kohler was impressed with the section on spells as it was both large and inclusive. The reviewer pointed out that many of them were updated versions of older Forgotten Realms spells, and he was rather disappointed with the amount of reprinted material in the book.

== Reviews ==
- Coleção Dragão Brasil
- Backstab #33
- Backstab #40 (as "La Magie de Faerûn")
