= Complete Warrior =

Tabletop role-playing game supplement

- Cover of Complete Warrior
- Author: Andy Collins, David Noonan, Ed Stark
- Genre: Role-playing game
- Publisher: Wizards of the Coast
- Publication date: November 2003
- Media type: Print (Hardcover)
- Pages: 160
- ISBN: 0-7869-2880-8

Complete Warrior is a supplemental rulebook for the 3.5 edition of the Dungeons & Dragons role-playing game, published by Wizards of the Coast. It replaces and expands upon an earlier rulebook entitled Sword and Fist.

== Contents ==
Complete Warrior presents additional rules and advice for the creation and use of character classes which specialize in melee and ranged combat. It also provides a catchall for anything that doesn't fit into Complete Adventurer, Complete Divine, Complete Arcane, or Complete Psionic.

=== New character classes ===
==== Hexblade ====
The Hexblade mixes martial prowess with a unique curse ability, the ability to cast arcane spells and good resistance against spells and spell effects. Similar in concept to the sorcerer, the Hexblade is an individual who possesses unnatural jinxes or an evil eye, and uses it towards combat. With a d10 for hit points, a 1/1 base attack bonus advancement, and a very slow spell advancement, the hexblade is more like an arcane ranger or paladin than a bard.

==== Samurai ====
The Samurai is a brave and noble warrior, possessing martial prowess and unique abilities to intimidate and terrify his opponents. Like the other classes, the Samurai has a d10 for hit points and a 1/1 base attack bonus advancement. The main drawback to playing a Samurai is the restrictions placed on the class. A Samurai cannot multiclass, then resume being a Samurai, some of his class abilities require him to use specific weaponry, and he is bound by the code of Bushido, which operates in a similar manner to the Paladin's code.

Samurai Pros and Cons (Wizards of the Coast)

==== Swashbuckler ====
Swashbuckler concentrate on speed and agility along with light armor fighting skills. The class utilizes a d10 hit die, and they have full base attack bonuses as well. Although they cannot wear medium or heavy armor, they possess certain combat capabilities such as charging through rough terrain and inflicting ability damage on critical strikes.

== Publication history ==
Complete Warrior was written by Andy Collins, David Noonan, and Ed Stark, and was published in November 2003. Cover art is by Wayne Reynolds, with interior art by Brent Chumley, Ed Cox, Wayne England, Rebecca Guay-Mitchell, Jeremy Jarvis, Doug Kovacs, Ginger Kubic, John and Laura Lakey, David Martin, Dennis Crabapple McClain, Matt Mitchell, Steve Prescott, Wayne Reynolds, David Roach, Mark Smylie, Brian Snoddy, Ron Spencer, and Joel Thomas.

As this book is not intended only for fighters, David Noonan clarified that Complete Warrior would be useful for: "In short, anybody who makes attack rolls. That's often the fighter, of course, but there's something in Complete Warrior for the polymorphed wizard, the wild-shaped druid, and any number of archetypes who don't trundle around in heavy armor heaving a big battleaxe."

== Reception ==
Viktor Coble listed the entire Complete series - including Complete Adventurer, Complete Divine, Complete Warrior, Complete Arcane, Complete Champion, and Complete Mage - as #9 on CBR's 2021 "D&D: 10 Best Supplemental Handbooks" list, stating that "These books took a deep dive into specific class types. They expanded on what it meant to be that kind of class, gave informative prestige classes, extra abilities, and even new concepts for playing them."

== Reviews ==
- Backstab #47
- Backstab #48 (as "Codex martial")
- Dragão Brasil
