= Complete Champion =

2007 role-playing game supplement

- Author: Ed Stark, Chris Thomasson, Rhiannon Louve, Ari Marmell, and Gary Astleford
- Genre: Role-playing game
- Published: June 2007 (Wizards of the Coast)
- Media type: Print (Hardback)
- Pages: 160
- ISBN: 978-0-7869-4034-9

Complete Champion is a supplement for the 3.5 edition of the Dungeons & Dragons fantasy role-playing game.

== Contents ==
Somewhat of a sequel to Complete Divine, the book is geared for characters who fight for a cause.

== Publication history ==
Complete Champion was written by Ed Stark, Chris Thomasson, Rhiannon Louve, Ari Marmell, and Gary Astleford, and was published in May 2007. Cover art was by Eric Polak, with interior art by Steve Argyle, Stephen Belledin, Miguel Coimbra, Thomas Denmark, Eric Deschamps, Wayne England, David Griffith, Fred Hooper, Ralph Horsley, Howard Lyon, Eva Widermann, and Sam Wood.

Thomasson defined the use of "champion" in the title to mean a "champion of faith", rather than in the more general sense of the term: "All characters have the potential to be champions; this book is focused on the divine, specifically divine magic and the religions of D&D --the goal we had was to make those elements of the game more accessible to characters other than paladins, clerics and druids."

== Reception ==
Viktor Coble listed the entire Complete series - including Complete Adventurer, Complete Divine, Complete Warrior, Complete Arcane, Complete Champion, and Complete Mage - as #9 on CBR's 2021 "D&D: 10 Best Supplemental Handbooks" list, stating that "These books took a deep dive into specific class types. They expanded on what it meant to be that kind of class, gave informative prestige classes, extra abilities, and even new concepts for playing them."
