= Whispers of the Vampire's Blade =

Dungeons & Dragons adventure module

- Rules required: Dungeons & Dragons, 3.5 edition
- Character levels: 4th
- Authors: David Noonan
- First published: September 2004

Whispers of the Vampire's Blade is an adventure module for the 3.5 edition of the Dungeons & Dragons fantasy role-playing game.

== Plot summary ==
Whispers of the Vampire's Blade takes place in the Eberron setting. A Brelish spy flees across Khorvaire with a powerful stolen magic sword, while operatives from multiple other factions pursue him.

== Publication history ==
Whispers of the Vampire's Blade was written by David Noonan, and was published in September 2004. Cover art was by Wayne Reynolds, with interior art by Steve Prescott.

== Reception ==
Dungeon Master for Dummies lists Whispers of the Vampire's Blade as one of the ten best 3rd edition adventures.
