= Complete Arcane =

2004 supplemental rulebook for 3.5 edition Dungeons & Dragons

- Complete Arcane cover
- Author: Richard Baker
- Genre: Role-playing game
- Publisher: Wizards of the Coast
- Publication date: November 1, 2004
- Media type: Print (Hardback)
- Pages: 192
- ISBN: 0786934352

Complete Arcane is a supplemental rulebook for the 3.5 edition of the Dungeons & Dragons role-playing game. It expands upon and replaces an earlier soft-cover rulebook entitled Tome and Blood.

== Contents ==
Complete Arcane presents additional rules and advice for the creation and use of character classes which specialize in arcane magic, which represents magic that is learned through research or inherent power as opposed to divine sources.

=== New classes ===
The Complete Arcane introduces three new base classes to the 3rd edition game.

==== Warlock ====
A Warlock has been given supernatural powers; either he or his ancestors made a deal with a supernatural being. A warlock has an innate magical ability called the eldritch blast, a damaging ray-like ability. The damage for this attack increases as the warlock gains levels. Instead of spells, warlocks gain a limited number of invocations, spell-like abilities with a distinctively sinister flavor. Most of these invocations may be performed at will, or have durations of 24 hours. Some invocations add effects to the warlock's eldritch blast, causing sickness, or blindness, or fright, etc.

==== Warmage ====
Warmages take the concept of "magical artillery" to its extreme. They specialize in direct-damage spells and can wear light armor (and later medium armor) without penalty to their spellcasting. Though they cast spells like a sorcerer, they have a very limited list of spells they can cast.

==== Wu Jen ====
Wu jen are arcane spellcasters with a distinct Oriental flavor. Wu Jen specialize in the casting of elemental spells. The five elements of Wu Jen magic are wood, fire, water, earth, and metal.

=== Prestige classes ===
Prestige classes are mainly updates from Tome & Blood.

- The Acolyte of the skin: forges a pact with demons or devils through bonding of a skin of a fiend to his own. The acolyte will eventually become an Outsider.
- The Alienist is a mage who studies & summons creatures beyond normal understanding, eventually becoming an Outsider.
- The Argent Savant is a mage who specializes in force spells.
- The Blood Magus, after being brought back from death, learns to evoke magic from the fluid that sustains their life.
- The Effigy Master masters the creation of magically animated constructs built in the form of other living creatures.
- The Elemental Savant focuses their studies on one of the four elements and its associated energy type.
- The Enlightened Fist combines magic with martial arts and development of the body.
- The Fate Spinner learns how to increase the probability of events in their favor.
- The Geometer is a master of runes, glyphes, sigils, and symbols.
- The Greenstar Adept is the master of the magic derived from green starmetal.
- The Initiate of the Sevenfold Veil can call up barriers of prismatic power, gaining the ability to produce a different layer of prismatic wall each level.
- The Mage of the Arcane Order is a member of an academy and guild known as Arcane Order.
- The Master Transmogrifist specializes in spells that changes their form.
- The Mindbender focuses on charms and compulsions.
- The Seeker of the Song wields the power of primal music.
- The Sublime Chord uses bardic music as a stepping stone to deeper insights into the song of creation.
- The Suel Arcanamach carries on the old tradition of the long dead Suel Empire and merge spell casting and sword play.
- The Wayfarer Guide specializes in magical transportation.
- The Wild mage is a master of chaotic magic.

=== Feats ===
Complete Arcane also introduces a number of metamagic feats and several others based on magic, including the Mage Slayer feat tree, which makes a character more dangerous to arcane casters.

=== Magic Items ===
Magic items include variant forms for potions and scrolls such as ceramic tiles that are broken to cause a spell effect instead of liquids that must be consumed, as well as spellbook materials for the discerning (or paranoid) wizard.

=== Campaigns ===
The last chapter of the book details how arcane magic can affect a campaign world, including the uses and abuses of Enchantment spells, flight, teleportation, and invisibility, and how nonmagical people would react to bards, sorcerers, wizards, and warlocks.

== Publication history ==
Complete Arcane was written by Richard Baker and published in November 2004. Cover art was by Matt Cavotta, with interior art by Steve Belledin, Matt Cavotta, Dennis Crabapple McClain, Emily Fiegenschuh, Doug Kovacs, Ginger Kubic, Jeff Miracola, Monte Moore, William O'Connor, Michael Phillippi, Ron Spencer, and Franz Vohwinkel.

Rich Baker described his creative process on the book: "I don't know if I have any one global process for thinking up new stuff. I can offer a little insight into how I derived some of our new material, though. If you look at the various schools of magic, you'll see that Abjuration really gets short shrift in most of our sourcebooks. So, I was determined to look hard at Abjuration spells and see if I couldn't re-envision the abjurer a little bit to make it cooler. It occurred to me that abjuration was the school of magic manipulating magic (for example, dispel magic) . . . which means that abjurers really ought to be the nastiest spell-duelists out there. If you want to build a wizard who specializes in gunslinging against other wizards, Abjuration should be your specialty. That's a pretty cool take on a school of magic that was formerly a little boring and overlooked, so I ran with it. I created a half-dozen key new Abjuration spells to support that vision, spells that screw with the other wizard's defenses and use your enemy's magic against him."

== Reception ==
Viktor Coble listed the entire Complete series - including Complete Adventurer, Complete Divine, Complete Warrior, Complete Arcane, Complete Champion, and Complete Mage - as #9 on CBR's 2021 "D&D: 10 Best Supplemental Handbooks" list, stating that "These books took a deep dive into specific class types. They expanded on what it meant to be that kind of class, gave informative prestige classes, extra abilities, and even new concepts for playing them."
