= Kingdoms of Kalamar Player's Guide =

Kingdoms of Kalamar Player's Guide is a 2002 role-playing game supplement published by Kenzer & Company for Dungeons & Dragons.

== Contents ==
Kingdoms of Kalamar Player's Guide is a supplement in which rules are provided for character generation, including new classes.

== Reviews ==
- Pyramid
- Backstab
- Asgard (Issue 6 - Jun 2002)
- Campaign Magazine (Issue 5 - Sep/Oct 2002)
