= Magic in Dungeons & Dragons =

Spells and magic systems used in D&D

The magic in Dungeons & Dragons consists of the spells and magic systems used in the settings of the role-playing game Dungeons & Dragons (D&D). D&D defined the genre of fantasy role-playing games, and remains the most popular table-top version. Many of the original concepts have become widely used in the role-playing community across many different fictional worlds, as well as across all manner of popular media including books, board games, video games, and films.

The specific effects of each spell, and even the names of some spells, vary from edition to edition of the Dungeons & Dragons corpus.

== Development ==
=== Origins ===
In 1974, the 36-page "Volume 1: Men & Magic" pamphlet was published as part of the original Dungeons & Dragons boxed set and included 12 pages about magic. It primarily describes individual spells where the "spells often but not always have both duration and ranges, and the explanation of spells frequently references earlier Chainmail materials". The first edition had over 100 spells that were "largely inflexible" and when a caster ran out of spells to cast, they were "defenseless fodder for orcs, goblins, and trolls". If a caster could "survive those vulnerable early levels, spells could grant godlike powers, like the reality-warping Wish spell, which does exactly what you think it does. A maxed-level fighter might be Achilles, but a level 20 magic-user was Zeus".

The publication of Advanced Dungeons & Dragons (1977) included a much more complex and systematic style to magic. "There is still a long list of individual spells, but every spell now includes a matrix specifying spell level, duration, area of effect, components, casting time, and saving throw". There are three types of components: "verbal components are magic words, material components are physical elements," and "somatic components are the arcane gestures of the hand and body". Magic was now divided into either arcane or divine magic.

This edition also includes what the game designer community would come to call the Vancian magic system. "In the Vancian model of magic, magic users must memorize all the spells which they wish to cast. When they cast a given spell, it disappears from memory and must be memorized again if the magic user so desires". The idea of spell memorization was inspired by the way magic works in Jack Vance's Dying Earth stories. In 1976, Gary Gygax wrote:

If magic is unrestrained in the campaign, D&D quickly degenerates into a weird wizard show where players get bored quickly... It is the opinion of this writer that the most desirable game is one in which the various character types are able to compete with each other as relative equals, for that will maintain freshness in the campaign.

The intent of the Vancian magic system in Dungeons & Dragons was to create restraints on magic users to balance the overall game.

=== d20 System ===
The d20 System was published in 2000 by Wizards of the Coast and was originally developed for the third edition of Dungeons & Dragons. Due to the Open Game License, the core set of rules are used as the basis for many games. Thus, many d20 games might use the D&D spell list from the System Reference Document, while others create their own or even replace the entire magic system.

The Vancian magic system included "basic assumptions about how arcane magic worked" that "only began to change with D&D 3e (2000), which introduced the non-memorizing sorcerer, and with D&D 3.5e (2003), which introduced the at-will warlock".

=== Modernization ===
The fourth edition of Dungeons & Dragons (2008) added unique powers to every class with a focus on party roles rather than just spell-casters having powers. The mechanical change of adding at-will and encounter powers "moved spell-casters away from the idea of 'Vancian' spell casting [...]. Magic items were also built into a character's progression, with each item having suggested levels". Fourth edition divided magic into three types: arcane, divine and primal. Druids now practiced primal magic while clerics and paladins practiced divine magic. Fourth edition also initially "abandoned the school-of-magic approach" to arcane magic, however, magic school specialization was reintroduced in the fourth edition Essentials line.

The fifth edition of Dungeons & Dragons (2014) uses a hybrid system of Vancian and at-will magic. Some classes, such as clerics and wizards, go through the process of preparing spells they can cast everyday from their spell list. Other classes, such as bards and sorcerers, "have a limited list of spells they know that are always fixed in the mind". The idea of at-will magic from fourth edition "mainly survives now as the mechanic behind cantrips, which allow spellcasting classes to keep using magic even when" they've used up all of their daily spell slots. Magic is once again only divided into two types: arcane and divine. In terms of spell usage across all classes, Kaila Hale-Stern, for The Mary-Sue, reported that of the 5th edition spells known or prepared by spell caster players on D&D Beyond the three most popular spells are Cure Wounds, Healing Word, and Detect Magic.

The One D&D public playtest reintroduced the fourth edition division of magic types: arcane, divine and primal in August 2022, although this division was removed in September 2023. The Revised Player's Handbook (2024) includes "over 400 spells, 30 of which are brand new, 27 of which are redesigned, and 162 of which are 'reworked'". The 2024 Revised 5th Edition also removed the division of spellcasters with known spells and spellcasters with prepared spells. Christian Hoffer of ComicBook.com explained that in 5th Edition "classes with prepared spells offered more day-to-day flexibility, while classes with known spells were a bit more limited in their day-to-day options but always knew what spells they could use on any given day. In the 2024 Core Rulebooks, all spellcasting classes have prepared spells, with each class stating how many spells a player can have prepared and how often they can swap out a prepared spell".

== Magic system ==
=== Types ===
In the Dungeons & Dragons game, magic is a force of nature and a part of the world. Since the publication of Advanced Dungeons & Dragons (1977), magic has typically been divided into two main types: arcane, which comes from the world and universe around the caster, and divine, which is inspired from above (or below): the realms of gods and demons. While there is no mechanical difference between arcane and divine magic, Jeremy Crawford, Co-Lead Designer of the 5th Edition, said:

That divide between arcane and divine ultimately is way more about the spellcaster than is about the spell. [...] So many different motivations can influence how magic users use their magic and to what purpose they put it. Your class helps determine that, and again this meta divide between divine and arcane can also provide a role-playing framework, and is this magic coming in service to a being or cause or are you in way manipulating reality to your own designs. Those are the questions posed by arcane magic and divine magic.

Bards, sorcerers, warlocks, and wizards learn to cast arcane spells, which are typically flashy and powerful. Clerics, druids, rangers and paladins cast divine spells, which draw their power from a deity, from nature, or simply the caster's inner faith. While some spells can be cast by both arcane and divine casters, other spells are limited to one type or the other. Crawford highlighted the thematic difference between divine and arcane magic, where the spell lists for divine spellcasters have fewer destructive spells and instead "tend to be filled with healing magic, magic that protects people. [...] Arcane power at its heart is really in a way about hacking the multiverse". As a result, spell lists for arcane spellcasters have "more spells that change the form of things, transmutation magic that completely alters the shape of something" and "more spells that will just alter reality culminating with the spell of spells wish".

The fourth edition of Dungeons & Dragons introduced a third type of magic called primal, which comes from the natural world; in this edition, druids channeled primal magic instead of divine. The fifth edition returned to original division of magic types.

==== Arcane magic ====
These are typically spells devoted to manipulating energy, converting one substance to another, or calling on the services of other creatures. Under the Vancian magic system, wizards would have access to spells that were committed to memory after a session of meditation upon a spellbook containing the details of the incantation. Once prepared, the spell is cast using specific words and/or gestures, and sometimes a specific material component; but the act of casting the spell causes it to fade from the wizard's memory, so that they cannot cast it again without first re-memorizing it. As the 3rd edition moved away from the Vancian magic system, some arcane spellcasters, such as sorcerers and bards, just knew their spells innately.

Sorcerers are innate casters whose magic is influenced by the origin of their arcane connection. "Some sorcerers trace their magic back to a powerful ancestor, like a dragon, a celestial, or a djinni. Others can delineate their magic to an extraplanar source, such as the shrouded lands of the Shadowfell, or the roiling chaos of Limbo". This origin adds both thematic and mechanical constraints on the types of spells a sorcerer can learn.

Bards have access to both destructive and healing spells. The healing aspect is "influenced by Irish mythology" where bards use "music and storytelling to weave together this magic to restore vigor and health to other people". Arcane power can also be accessed by more martial classes in the form of specific subclasses such as the arcane trickster and the eldritch knight in 5th edition.

==== Divine magic ====
Divine spells take their name from the fact that they are mainly granted to clerics by the grace of the cleric's patron deity, although the spells cast by druids, rangers and paladins also come under this category. Divine spells do not need to be prepared from a spell book. These spells are generally less overtly powerful than arcane spells and have fewer offensive applications.

Cleric spells are typically devoted to either healing the wounded, restoring lost abilities, and acquiring blessings, or to inflict harm and to curse opponents. These spells must be prepared by the caster daily through a session of meditation or prayer. Clerics also have the ability either to turn (drive off or destroy) or to rebuke (cow or command) undead, based on their alignment. The spells and abilities of a cleric are based on their deity, as well as their alignment.

Druid spells are typically devoted to communing with nature, interpreting or directing the weather, communicating with creatures and plants, and the like. The druid shares some spells with the cleric, such as some healing spells, and has a number of offensive spells which use the power of nature—calling down lightning storms, for example, or summoning wild animals to fight. They also gain special powers such as shapeshifting; but these are not considered spells and do not need to be prepared.

Paladin and ranger spells are similar to cleric and druid spells, respectively, but they are allowed fewer spells per day, only gain access to lower-level spells, and gain access to them more slowly. Both classes have some unique spells that can be fairly powerful, despite their low level. In compensation for their diminished spellcasting ability, paladins and rangers have a more martial focus than clerics and druids.

In 2nd edition, divine spells were divided into 16 thematic spheres, with clerics, druids and specialty priests gaining access to spells from different spheres. The core spheres are All (generic divine spells), Animal, Astral, Charm, Combat, Creation, Divination, Elemental (optionally divided into Air, Earth, Fire and Water sub-spheres), Healing, Necromancy, Plant, Protection, Summon, Sun and Weather. Tome of Magic (1991) introduced the Chaos, Numbers, Law, Thought, Time, War and Wards spheres. Spheres were not retained in subsequent editions.

==== Primal magic ====
Primal abilities come from a practitioner harnessing the power of the natural world. In fourth edition, primal magic was used by barbarians, druids, shamans, and wardens. Shannon Appelcline, author of Designers & Dragons, commented that "D&D 4e's primal power source focuses on transformation: the barbarian rages, the druid wild shapes, and the warden hybridizes. The shaman the only standard build that didn't follow this trend; the designers thought that it was complex enough already".

Primal magic was reintroduced in Dungeons & Dragons with the One D&D public playtest in August 2022. This outlined that the source of primal magic is "the forces of nature found in the inner planes". Druids and rangers are the practitioners of primal magic. However, this division was removed in September 2023.

=== Schools of magic ===
There are eight classic schools of magic in Dungeons & Dragons, as originally named in Advanced Dungeons & Dragons: abjuration, alteration, conjuration, divination, enchantment, illusion, invocation, and necromancy. Each spell belongs to one of eight schools of magic. The ability to specialize in specific schools of magic was formally introduced in the 2nd edition Player's Handbook (1989) and then greatly expanded on in The Complete Wizard's Handbook (1990). Jeff Howard, in his book Game Magic: A Designer's Guide to Magic Systems in Theory and Practice, highlights that the schools of magic do not "necessarily refer to an academic institution for learning and teaching" but rather "schools of magic constitute a taxonomy of reality, in the sense of methodical and ordered classification of the chaos of existence and experience into a structured and order whole. The domains are aspects of existence over which various spells operate".

In 4th edition, spell schools are initially absent but were reintroduced with the Dungeons & Dragons Essentials supplement. The spell schools introduced are Enchantment, Evocation, Illusion, Necromancy, and Nethermancy (corresponding to the Shadow subschool of the Illusion school from the previous editions). The spells of other classical schools are present in the form of utility spells (like True Seeing being available but not being specifically named a Divination spell) or spell descriptors (like Conjuration or Summoning).

Name	Original name	Description
Abjuration	Abjuration	This school is focused on protective spells, as well as spells which cancel or interfere with other spells, magical effects or supernatural abilities. Wizards who specialize in this school are known as Abjurers.
Conjuration	Conjuration/Summoning	This school is focused on instantaneous transportation, conjuring manifestations of creatures, energy or objects, and object creation. In earlier editions, this school was known as Conjuration/Summoning but became known as Conjuration in the 3rd and 3.5 editions. In 3rd and 3.5 editions, healing spells are also part of the conjuration school, however of the three core arcane classes, these spells are generally restricted to bards. Wizards who specialize in this school are known as Conjurers.
Divination	Divination	This school is focused on acquiring and revealing information. In 2nd edition, Divination was divided into two schools: Lesser Divination (all Divination spells up to 4th level) and Greater Divination (all Divination spells of 5th level or higher) in order to prevent specialist wizards from losing access to certain utility spells such as Detect Magic, Identify and Read Magic. Wizards who specialize in this school are known as Diviners.
Enchantment	Enchantment/Charm	This school is focused on affecting "the minds of others" including "influencing or controlling their behavior". Prior to 3rd edition it was known as Enchantment/Charm. In 3rd edition, the school changed dramatically when all non-mind-affecting spells were removed from the school and many were moved to Transmutation. In 3rd and 3.5 editions, Enchantment is divided into two subschools: compulsion and charm. Charm spells usually making them act more favorably toward the caster. Compulsion spells can force the targets' to act in a certain way or avoid certain actions, affect the targets' emotions or affect the targets' minds in other ways. Wizards who specialize in this school are known as Enchanters.
Evocation	Invocation	This school pertains to "creating matter and energy, called up out of nothing [...] The classic spells magic missile and burning hands, both of which call up destructive energy with which to attack enemies, are both examples of evocation". Wizards who specialize in this school are known as evokers. In 5th edition, healing magic became evocation as well.
Illusion	Illusion/Phantasm	This school "involves the ability to change the appearance of something, by creating a phantasm". The school is known as Illusion/Phantasm prior to 3rd edition and Illusion in 3rd and 3.5 editions. Wizards who specialize in this school are known as Illusionists.
Necromancy	Necromancy	Necromancy spells involve death, undeath, and the manipulation of life energy. Prior to 3rd edition, healing spells are in the Necromancy school, however these spells are generally restricted to clerics and/or druids. Healing spells were shifted to the Conjuration school in 3rd edition, and Evocation in 5th edition. Wizards who specialize in this school are known as Necromancers.
Transmutation	Alteration/Transmutation	This school focuses on the ability to change matter. Spells in this school alter the properties of their targets. This school was known as Alteration/Transmutation prior to 3rd edition, and as Transmutation in 3rd and 3.5 editions. In 3rd edition, many non-mind-affecting spells from 2nd edition's Enchantment/Charm school were moved to the Transmutation school. Wizards who specialize in this school are known as Transmuters.

== Other forms of magic ==
Name	First Appearance	Description
Circle Magic	3rd Edition	Circle Magic was introduced in the 3rd edition book Forgotten Realms Campaign Setting (2001). This allows groups of spellcasters to create particularly powerful magic. It is particularly associated with the Red Wizards of Thay and the Witches of Rashemen. It was reintroduced in the 5th edition sourcebook Forgotten Realms: Heroes of Faerûn (2025). The sourcebook also introduced new spells that have unique effects when cast with circle magic.
Dunamancy	5th Edition	Dunamancy was originally created by Matthew Mercer for Critical Role, a Dungeons & Dragons web series, and then was added to the canon in the 5th edition sourcebook Explorer's Guide to Wildemount (2020). "Dunamancy involves the manipulation of entropy, gravity, and time" where "dunamancers draw power from alternate timelines and unseen realities, subtly affect the flow of time, and even tighten or loosen the grip of gravity". Explorer's Guide to Wildemount added three new subclasses (Chronurgy and Graviturgy for wizards and Echo Knight for fighters) and 15 new dunamancy spells. While dunamancy acts as a source of magic, the new spells fit within the pre-existing schools of magic. Time magic and wizards who specialized in it were previously explored in the 2nd edition supplement Chronomancer (1995).
Elven High Magic	2nd Edition	Elven High Magic was added to the Forgotten Realms setting in the 2nd edition sourcebook Cormanthyr: Empire of the Elves (1998). It is a type of powerful ritual magic that can only be used by Elves and it can be used to create mythals, change reality and even affect the Gods. These epic level spells were typically cast by a group of spellcasters to make the casting easier. The 3.5 edition sourcebook Lost Empires of Faerûn (2005) highlighted that these casters often lost their lives when they attempted Elven High Magic as they would be consumed by the spell. The Elf High Mage epic destiny allows for the casting of high magic in 4th edition, though the specific applications of this ability were left vague.
Incarnum	3.5 Edition	Incarnum was introduced in the 3.5 edition book Magic of Incarnum (2005) by James Wyatt. Wyatt wrote that "incarnum is energy drawn from living, dead, and preincarnate souls. It is magic, but it doesn't fall into [the arcane, divine, or psionic] categories. Spellcasters of all sorts [...] can all make use of it with the proper training. In short, incarnum is not a type of magic - it is a substance that people can learn to manipulate". This book also added three new classes (Incarnate, Soulborn, and Totemist) where "the users of incarnum fall somewhere beyond the wizard on the rigidity end of the scale. They shape their soulmelds on a daily basis - a process much like casting spells, except that the effects just remain active". By drawing on the incarnum, users can become better at fighting, more skilled, or gain special abilities. Similar to the way psionics were incorporated, the book contained variant rules for adding the incarnum to the game.
Pact magic (Binding)	3.5 Edition	Pact magic, or Binding, was one of three magic systems introduced in the 3.5 edition book Tome of Magic (2006). It revolves around the summoning and binding of powerful entities, called vestiges, to grant the user supernatural abilities. As all abilities granted by vestiges are supernatural in nature, as opposed to spell-like, there is little overlap with normal spellcasting. These powers are useful, but if a prospective binder fails to make a pact (governed by a skill check), they are subject to that vestige's influence, behaving as it requires (e.g. a pyromaniac vestige could require its binder to burn all flammable objects it possesses). Pact magic reappeared in both the 4th edition Player's Handbook (2008) and the 5th edition Player's Handbook (2014) as the main mechanic for warlocks. In both editions, warlocks acquired their unique class features and spellcasting ability by forming pacts with powerful entities such as fey or infernal creatures.
Reversible spells	1st Edition	In 1st and 2nd edition AD&D, some spells have the reversible trait. These spells are memorized in either their normal or reverse version. For example, the reversed form of the Cure Serious Wounds spell, which heals a touched target, is Cause Serious Wounds, which damages a touched target, while the reversed form of the Water Breathing spell, which allows the target to breathe water, is Air Breathing, which allows the target to breathe air, and the reversed form of the Continual Light spell, which provides magical illumination, is Continual Darkness, which causes magical darkness.
Shadow magic	2nd Edition	Shadow magic was introduced in the 2nd Edition book Player's Option: Skills & Powers (1995)—which included four new schools of magic—as an additional school of magic with its own specialist wizard, the shadow mage, whose magical potency when casting spells depends on the balance between light and darkness around them. In 3rd Edition's Tome of Magic (2006), the Shadowcaster manipulates shadow plane energy to create a variety of effects. Some of shadow magic's stronger suits include single-target damage (and to a lesser extent, area damage), espionage and divination, and reacting to or influencing the magic of others. Shadow magic reappeared for the 4th edition as a power source in Heroes of Shadow (2011) and as a sorcerer subclass for the 5th edition in Xanathar's Guide to Everything (2017).
Truename magic	3.5 Edition	Truename magic was introduced in the 3.5 edition book Tome of Magic (2006). A Truenamer is a caster that utilizes the power of truenames to create a variety of effects. Mechanically, Trunamers are very much a "support"-oriented class whose strong suits include healing and protection, weapon and armor augmentation, and battlefield harassment. In October 2019, Truename magic was reintroduced as the wizard subclass Onomancy as part of the 5th edition Unearthed Arcana public playtest. In May 2020, it was announced that the Onomancy subclass was no longer being developed.
Universal spells	3rd Edition	Spells that do not fall into any of the eight schools of magic were called universal spells and were introduced in the 3rd edition. As universal spells are not a school, per se, no one can specialize in them. These spells can "affect other spells or change the very nature of magic or reality itself". The most famous of these spells is Wish, the most powerful spell within the game, which can duplicate spells from all schools.
Wild magic	2nd Edition	A form of arcane magic used by wild mages that can tap directly into the Weave to create often unpredictable results that was introduced to the game in the Forgotten Realms Adventures (1990). In 2nd Edition, Tome of Magic (1991) added "a new class of magician who studied wild magic - the wild mage - and made him available to worlds beyond Toril. These wild mages were one of Tome of Magic's most long-lasting additions to D&D, as their reappeared as a prestige class for 3.5e in Complete Arcane (2004)" In 4th and 5th edition, wild magic appears as an option for sorcerer; as a spell source in 4th edition's Player's Handbook 2 (2009), and as a subclass option in 5th edition's Player's Handbook (2014).

== Magic in campaign settings ==
=== Dark Sun ===
In the Dark Sun campaign setting, arcane magic draws its power from the life force of plants or living creatures, with the potential to cause tremendous harm to the environment. Arcane spellcasters may cast spells in a manner that preserves nature, known as preservers, or in a manner that destroys it, known as defilers. However, any arcane caster may choose to defile at any time. As a result, wizards and other arcane casters are despised and must practice in secret. Due to the scarcity of natural resources on the fictional planet Athas, few wizards have access to books made of paper pages and hard covers; instead, they record their spells with string patterns and complex knots. Psionics are extremely common with nearly every living thing having at least a modicum of psionic ability. Unlike arcane magic, psionic abilities are accepted and revered in every strata of Athasian society.

Athas has no deities and no formal religions other than the cults created by the sorcerer-kings. Clerics and druids instead draw power from the Inner Planes/Elemental Chaos. In previous editions, templars (casters who directly serve and derive their powers from the sorcerer-kings) were treated as a specialized form of cleric. In 4th edition, the templar class shifted away from being a divine caster to an arcane caster, though not all templars are skilled in magic. Many templars are not clerics at all but instead warlocks who have pacted with their sorcerer-king and thus are entirely dependent on their patrons for their magical abilities.

=== Forgotten Realms ===
In the Forgotten Realms campaign setting, the Weave is the source of both arcane and divine spellcasting. Within the context of the Forgotten Realms, raw magic is characterized as difficult for mortals to access safely. The Weave works to protect the world from the dangers of unrefined magic while giving the ability to cast spells to magic users. Destroying the Weave results in widespread destruction. Reckless use of magic can also damage the Weave, creating areas of dead or wild magic where normal spellcasting doesn't work. In ancient Netheril, "Spellcasters are arcanists and do not memorise spells – they merely pluck them out of the weave." The Weave is present in everything and is part of the goddess Mystra's body, who actively willed its effects. The Sword Coast Adventurer's Guide (2015) states, "in two senses, both the metaphorical and the real, the goddess Mystra is the Weave. She is its keeper and tender, but all three times the goddess of magic has died or been separated from her divinity [...], magic has been twisted or has failed entirely".

Spellfire is an ability to wield the Weave's raw energy. It has appeared in both sourcebooks and novels set in the Forgotten Realms. J.R. Zambrano of Bell of Lost Souls called it "an iconic part of the Forgotten Realms" and compared it to unobtanium and quantum entanglement, noting that Spellfire often acts as "plot device magic. Whenever you need magic to do something weird and outside of the rules of D&D, Spellfire is there". In 1996, it was introduced as a "phantom" secondary class for Advanced Dungeons & Dragons 2nd Edition in the supplement Volo's Guide to All Things Magical. Paul Pettengale, in a review in Arcane magazine, commented on the new form of magic in the supplement: "What's that called? Why, Spellfire of course, which just happens to be the name of a certain collectible card game by TSR. Spellfire is a complicated business, and I wouldn't actually encourage any DM to give it to a player to use; it's way too powerful for the majority of campaigns, and the very possession of it suggests close affiliation with Mystra, which most wizards would never aspire to". In 2001, a Spellfire themed feat and prestige class were added to 3rd Edition in the supplement Magic of Faerûn. Player's Guide to Faerûn (2004), a 3.5 Edition sourcebook, added a Spellfire themed epic prestige class. In 2025, 5th Edition added a Spellfire themed Sorcerer subclass in the sourcebook Heroes of Faerûn after it appeared in playtest material.

== Spellcasting game mechanics ==
=== Spell levels ===
Spell levels were introduced in the "Volume 1: Men & Magic" (1974) pamphlet where spell levels maxed "out at 6th level for magic-users and 5th level for clerics". Supplement I: Greyhawk (1975), an expansion for OD&D, increased the maximum spell level. "Cleric spells were expanded to 7th level and wizards spells to 9th, creating the limits that would be used throughout the AD&D run of the game". Spell levels 1-9 became the standard mechanic for each subsequent edition of Dungeons & Dragons. The 5th edition Player's Handbook (2014) states that "a spell's level is a general indicator of how powerful it is, with the lowly (but still impressive) magic missile at 1st level and the earth-shaking wish at 9th. [...] The higher a spell's level, the higher level a spellcaster must be to use that spell". 5th edition Revised Player's Handbook (2024) states that "each class has a fixed number of prepared spells (determined based on the player's level in a spellcasting class)" which is a change from the 2014 mechanic where the number of prepared spells was "determined by a combination of a specific ability modifier and that player's level".

=== Spell slots ===
Spellcasters can only cast a spell they know or have prepared if they have an available spell slot. This mechanic originated out of the Vancian magic system where "the number of memorized spells is strictly limited by the magician's memory capacity in proportion to the spells' difficulty levels, effectively granting a number of spell slots". Dungeons & Dragons simplified Vance's formula "to a number of spell slots scaling with the player character's level". In the 3rd edition, the mechanic to cast a spell was described as a drain on a spellcaster's resources which reduces their capacity to cast additional spells. The 5th edition Player's Handbook (2014) states that "regardless of how many spells a caster knows or prepares, he or she can cast only a limited number of spells before resting. Manipulating the fabric of magic and channeling its energy into even a simple spell is physically and mentally taxing, and higher-level spells are even more so. [...] When a character casts a spell, he or she expends a slot of that spell's level or higher, effectively 'filling' a slot with the spell. [...] Finishing a long rest restores any expended spell slots".

=== Ritual magic ===
The 2nd edition sourcebook Tome of Magic (1991) introduced many new variant spell concepts. The cleric class gained access to community-powered spells, cooperatively cast spells, and "super-powerful spells that required a quest before they could be cast". Most of these new concepts have disappeared since 2nd edition, however, "a few of the quest spells did show up in [3rd edition] as 9th-level priest spells".

The 3.5 edition sourcebook Unearthed Arcana (2004) added optional rules to Dungeons & Dragons including variant systems for magic. It expanded on the concept of incantations which were introduced in the d20 System Reference Document as part of the variant magic rules. Incantations were designed to give non-spellcasters access to magic and to give lower level games access to higher level magic. Unearthed Arcana states "at its simplest, casting an incantation is akin to preparing and cooking something according to a recipe". However, there are drawbacks to attempting to cast incantations: they are time-consuming, they require particular circumstances and sometimes multiple casters, the components can be expensive, and there's no guarantee the incantation will work successively.

In 4th edition, rituals became a key part of the magic system. Rituals replaced many non-combat spells and had no limitation on how often they could be cast except for time and material resources. "The instructions have to be written down" and could not be cast from memory. Artificers, bards, clerics, druids, invokers, psions, and wizards had ritual casting as a class feature, while other character classes could become ritual casters by selecting the corresponding feat.

In 5th edition, rituals continued to be a key part of spell casting. Some spells have the ritual tag which means that the "spell can be cast following the normal rules for spellcasting, or the spell can be cast as a ritual. The ritual version of a spell takes 10 minutes longer to cast than normal. It also doesn't expend a spell slot, which means the ritual version of a spell can't be cast at a higher level". Similar to 4th edition, some character classes, such as the cleric, druid, and wizard classes, were automatically ritual casters. Other characters could become ritual casters by picking up a specific feat or subclass feature. Unlike 4th edition, the caster must "have the spell prepared [on their] list of spells known, unless the character's ritual feature specifies otherwise, as the wizard's does".

=== Components ===
The casting of spells within Dungeons & Dragons often requires the mage to do, say, or use something in order for the spell to work. Spells may require a verbal, somatic, or material component or a magical focus. These actions are performed by the fictional character in the game, not by the player in the real world. The player may simply state what the character does, or may embellish with sound effects or gestures to enhance the theatrics of the game.

In 4th edition, spell components were eliminated as a mechanic. Flavor text for some spells and prayers mention words, gestures or objects, however this is purely cosmetic. Although 4th edition eliminated the component mechanic for spells, most rituals require material components, some rituals require foci and many spells and prayers benefit from magical implements. In 5th edition, spells may require a verbal, somatic, or material component. Mikael Sebag, in the journal Games and Culture, highlighted that material components often have "clear symbolic associations between the component and the spell's intended effect" and "many of the material components first introduced in the 1978 Player's Handbook for Advanced Dungeons & Dragons (TSR) have persisted into the most recent 2016 fifth edition of Dungeons & Dragons". Sebag commented that spellcasters utilize material components "in symbolic, analogic ways that speak to the object's representational properties over its literal chemical composition or physical instrumentality. While this may be inconsistent with the linear causality of a physics engine operating on a Newtonian conception of the universe, such manipulations (and outcomes) are highly congruent with the premodern enchanted worldview that sees symbolic relationships as having their own special lines of causality".

Type	Edition	Description
Verbal component	AD&D, 2nd, 3rd/3.5, 5th	Many spells require the caster to speak certain words, or, in the case of a post-1st Edition bard, create music, to cast a spell. Being prevented from speaking, by such means as a gag or magical effects that remove sounds, makes it impossible for a caster to cast such a spell. A deafened caster may also fail when casting a spell, by misspeaking, which causes the spell to be expended with no effect.
Somatic component	AD&D, 2nd, 3rd/3.5, 5th	Many spells require the caster to make a motion to cast the spell. If the caster is unable to make the correct motion, the spell cannot be cast. Prior to 4th edition, wearing armor or using a shield interferes with the somatic components of arcane spells (but not divine spells), preventing spellcasting prior to 3rd edition and creating a risk of arcane spell failure (which causes the spell to be expended with no effect) in 3rd and 3.5 editions. In 3.5 edition, bards and some other arcane classes can cast spells in light armor without this risk.
Material component	AD&D, 2nd, 3rd/3.5, 4th, 5th	Casting a spell often requires that the caster sacrifice some sort of material component, which typically has a thematic connection to the spell. Often, these components are of negligible cost (egg shells, sand, a feather, etc.), but spells which allow major bending or breaking of the laws of nature, such as spells to reanimate the dead or grant wishes, require material components costing thousands of gold pieces (precious or semiprecious gems, statuettes, etc.). In 3rd and 3.5 editions, components with negligible cost are not tracked by default, and do not need to be acquired in play, any character who has their spell component pouch is presumed to have a sufficient supply of such components whenever they cast a spell. If a caster is unable to access or use the correct material component, the spell cannot be cast. In 1st and 2nd editions, some components were not consumed during casting, in 3rd edition, this concept was split off into focus components. In 4th edition, spells and prayers do not require material components, however costly components are required for most rituals. 5th edition resumed spells requiring material components; as with previous editions, negligible cost components could be ignored through use of a spell focus or component pouch, while expensive components and components consumed by the spell during its casting are still necessary for more major spell effects.
Focus component	3rd/3.5, 4th, 5th	Casting a spell may require that the caster has access to a specific, generally thematic prop, called a focus. Many bard spells require a musical instrument as a focus. A number of divine spells require a divine focus: a holy symbol or other special object; unlike a regular focus, which is specific and varies from spell to spell, a character can use the same divine focus for any spell with a divine focus requirement. Some spells with both arcane and divine versions require a material component or focus for the arcane version and a divine focus for the divine version. The focus and divine focus components were introduced in 3rd edition; however, 1st and 2nd editions had a counterpart: material components which were not consumed. In 4th edition, spells and prayers with the weapon keyword require a weapon, with some requiring a specific weapon type; those with the implement keyword benefit from an appropriate magical implement but do not require one. Additionally, some rituals require a specific focus. In 5th edition, a spellcaster can use a component pouch or a spellcasting focus in place of a spell's material component if the material component has no cost listed in the spell's description or if it is not consumed by the spell as part of its casting.
Implement	4th, 5th	4th edition introduced implements. Magic implements fill a similar role to magic weapons; if a character wields an appropriate magical implement in using a power with the implement keyword, that power can benefit from its properties. Rods are used by artificers, invokers, and warlocks. Staffs, which also function as weapons, are used by artificers, druids, invokers, psions, sorcerers and wizards. Totems are used by druids and shamans. Wands are used by artificers, bards, warlocks and wizards. Holy symbols are used by Avengers, Clerics and Paladins; unlike other implements, a character can benefit from a holy symbol by wearing it rather than needing to wield it. Orbs are used by wizards and psions. Tomes are used by wizards, and musical instruments are used by bards. Sorcerers can use daggers as implements, swordmages can use any weapon in the light and heavy blade groups, and certain paragon paths such as Wizard of the Spiral Tower can use specific weapon types as implements. The ki focus implement, usable by assassins and monks, can be worn like a holy symbol and allows its wearer to confer its benefits to any weapon they wield, overwriting any previous magic the weapon may have. Additionally, some magic weapons, such as Holy Avengers (for paladins), Pact Blades (for warlocks) and Songblades (for bards), function as implements. In 5th edition, some items (such as rods, staffs, and wands) can act as an arcane focus for a spellcaster.
Experience component	3rd/3.5	In 3rd and 3.5 edition, certain powerful spells, such as Wish, Miracle, and Atonement require a caster to pay a certain number of experience points, the same that are used to determine in-game level progression, in order to reduce the overuse of such a powerful spell.

== Sample spells ==
The following is a sampling of spells featured in multiple Dungeons & Dragons iterations.

=== Arcane spells ===
- Color Spray: A vivid cone of clashing colors springs forth from the caster's hand, causing creatures to become stunned, perhaps also blinded, and possibly even knocking them unconscious.
- Darkvision: The subject gains the ability to see clearly (albeit in black and white) in total darkness.
- Feather Fall: The affected creatures or objects fall slowly; at a feather rate. Feather fall instantly changes the rate at which the targets fall to a mere 60 feet per round (equivalent to the end of a fall from a few feet), and the subjects take no damage upon landing while the spell is in effect. However, when the spell duration expires, a normal rate of falling resumes.
- Fireball: A tiny ball flies forward from the caster, exploding in a huge fireball at a point designated by the caster. While an extremely potent spell, the caster must take care to avoid catching allies in the explosion, or to accidentally strike an obstruction and detonate the spell early.
- Flesh to Stone: The subject, along with all its carried gear, is turned into a mindless, inert, stone statue. If the statue resulting from this spell is broken or damaged, the subject (if ever returned to its original state) has similar damage or deformities. (See also: Petrification)
- Invisibility: The target of this spell becomes invisible for a time, but immediately becomes visible if they attack a person or creature or casts another spell.
- Magic Missile: A bolt of pure energy from the caster's fingertips. It strikes a target automatically, with multiple missiles launched at higher levels. The spell's ability to cause automatic damage makes it one of the most-used spells. In the initial release of 4th edition, magic missile required an attack roll. The July 2010 update changed this back to an automatic hit, albeit with a lower amount of damage.
- Meteor Swarm: Four meteors fly forward and explode like Fireballs. One of the most destructive spells in the game, capable of rending castles or devastating entire armies.
- Polymorph: Transforms a target into another creature of the caster's choosing, such as an ogre, a small giant or the like. In some editions, polymorph is divided into several spells, for example, in 3rd edition, it is divided into Polymorph Self, which can only target the caster, and Polymorph Other, a higher level spell which can affect other targets, while in 3.5 edition, it is divided into Polymorph, which can only affect a willing target, and the higher level Baleful Polymorph, can transform an unwilling target into a weaker form, such as a frog.
- Scrying: Allows the caster to spy on someone from a distance.
- Summon Monster: Summons a single extraplanar creature or several weaker extraplanar creatures. Most of the creatures are animals with the celestial creature template, although elementals and other creatures unique to other planes are also available. In 3rd edition, there is a distinct Summon Monster spell, differentiated by a Roman numeral, for each of the nine spell levels, with higher level spells summoning more powerful monsters. In 5th edition, there are 17 spells with the summoning tag and summoning is broken up creature type. Tasha's Cauldron of Everything added nine additional summon monster spells that were originally part of the Unearthed Arcana playtest.
- Teleport: Allows the caster to instantly appear somewhere else in the world, though at lower levels this ability can be somewhat imprecise.
- Time Stop: Allows the caster to manipulate the flow of time, giving them few extra moments to act when time is "stopped" for everyone (and everything) else.
- Wish: The mightiest of all non-epic spells a wizard or sorcerer can cast. Bending reality, the caster can change the events of the past few minutes, create an object from nothing, emulate another spell or create practically any effect they can imagine. However, casting the spell has a considerable cost, which varied between editions. In 1st and 2nd edition AD&D, casting Wish causes the caster to age several years. In 3rd and 3.5 editions, this spell drains the caster of experience points. In 5th edition, using the spell for anything other than duplicating a spell of 8th level or lower causes serious arcane stress, severely weakening the caster for between 2 and 8 days and a 33 percent chance of leaving them unable to cast Wish ever again. Though the wish can technically fulfill any desire, there are set limitations as to what can be wished for without consequence. Dungeon Masters are often encouraged to interpret a player's wish as literally as possible, particularly for selfish or greedy wishes (or any other wish that exceeds the set boundaries for "safe" wishes). For example, if someone wished for a fortune in gold, the DM could grant the wish by appropriating a local king's treasury, making the wisher a target for retaliation. Or, if somebody wished to live forever, they could end up being trapped in a timeless extradimensional space. Thus, the wisher must be very careful upon using the spell.

=== Divine spells ===
- Cure light wounds: A basic healing spell available to clerics, druids, bards, paladins, and rangers. Cure critical wounds is a more powerful healing spell available only to clerics, druids, and bards. In 5th edition, there is only one Cure wounds spell, with Mass Cure Wounds simply extending the original spell to up to 6 creatures within a thirty-foot radius.
- Detect evil: The caster is able to tell if someone or something they look at is evil. Other versions of this spell exist for the various other alignment components, such as good, lawful, and chaotic.
- Raise dead: The power to revive a deceased character, as long as their remains are roughly whole and have not deteriorated beyond a certain point. In some editions, the character being revived will lose enough experience points to drop their most recent class level. More potent versions of this spell include resurrection, which needs only a fragment of the body, and true resurrection, which doesn't need the body at all and can be performed many years after the character's death.
- Miracle: This is the Divine equivalent of wish. It essentially calls upon the cleric's deity to perform an epic miracle, such as resurrecting an entire army or lifting a massive curse. Unlike wish, it may or may not come at a high cost of experience points, depending on the miracle requested. The miracle-granting deity is typically more forgiving of its followers' requests than the wish spell is, but this can change depending on the deity's alignment and the specific miracle being requested.
- Summon Nature's Ally: This Druid spell can summon one creature or several weaker creatures. It is similar to the arcane Summon Monster spells (which Clerics can also cast as Divine spells), and like Summon Monster there is a variant of Summon Nature's Ally for each spell level. Summon Nature's Ally differs from Summon Monster in the kind of creatures it is capable of summoning. Most of the available creatures are animals, although elementals, magical beasts and fey are also available. In 5th edition, druids, rangers and some bards have access to the spell now known as Conjure Woodland Beings.
- Stick to Snakes: Allows a cleric to turn a pile of sticks into snakes.

== See also ==
- Magic item (Dungeons & Dragons)
