= Jesse Decker =

Editor and game designer

- Born: Jesse Decker
- Occupation: Game designer
- Writing career
- Genre: Role-playing games

Jesse Decker is an author, designer, and editor of roleplaying game material.

== Biography ==
Decker began playing Dungeons & Dragons in 1983 during recess at his elementary school. During the summer of 1996, he began doing "temp work" for Wizards of the Coast, before returning to finish college that fall. After finishing college, he returned to Wizards of the Coast, where he spent six months as a tournament judge at the company's first Game Center. Deciding "to forgo graduate school for a few years," Decker successfully applied for an editorial position at Wizards, becoming the editorial assistant for Dungeon and Dragon magazines. In 1999, Decker became editor-in-chief of Dragon, serving as such until 2003 with Paizo Publishing. He is now the director of Organized Play at Wizards of the Coast.

David Noonan, Andy Collins, Mike Mearls, and Decker were part of Rob Heinsoo's "Flywheel" design team for the fourth edition of Dungeons & Dragons, and did the final concept work from May 2006 to September 2006, before the first books for the edition were written and playtested.

== Sources ==
- Cook, Monte. "A Talk with Jesse Decker: A 30th Anniversary Interview." Monte's Journal. Montecook.com, 2004.
