= Sorcerer (Dungeons & Dragons) =

Character class in the Dungeons & Dragons roleplaying game

- Dungeons & Dragons character class

Editions
- Standard class: 3rd; v3.5; 5th; 5.5e
- Alternate class: 4th

Publication history
- First appearance: Player's Handbook (3rd edition)
- Source books: Player's Handbook (2000, 2003, 2014, 2024); Player's Handbook 2

Grouping
- 4E powersource: Arcane
- 4E role: Striker

The sorcerer is a playable character class in the Dungeons & Dragons fantasy role-playing game. A sorcerer is weak in melee combat, but a master of arcane magic, generally the most powerful form of D&D magic. Sorcerers' magical ability is innate rather than studied or bargained.

== Publication history ==
=== Dungeons & Dragons 3rd edition ===
The sorcerer class was introduced in the third edition as being distinct from the wizard class, having more in common with contemporary fantasy fiction than the Vancian spell system of previous editions. Sorcerers were introduced in the 3rd edition Player's Handbook, and updated in the 3.5 edition Player's Handbook.

Compared to wizards, sorcerers' instinctive grasp of magic has more flexibility within the moment but less versatility overall. That is, they do not need to prepare specific spells in advance, but each sorcerer also acquires a much smaller number of spells, since they do not use spell books and cannot simply copy new spells from others' writing. Conversely, they do not worry about carrying spell books and having them stolen. Other effects of the sorcerers' intuitive approach are that they can cast more spells per day, but qualify for more powerful spells slightly more slowly than wizards.

Since sorcerers can only have a limited number of spells in their arsenal, most tend to specialize in the offensive magic that an adventurer will use most. While they gain only a few non-combat spells, they have perhaps more sheer destructive force than any other character class. Their biggest strength is also their most fundamental disadvantage: sorcerers lack the versatility of wizards, who can use any information on an adventure ahead to prepare spells from a wide range of options. The flexible sorcerer, however, can still choose which of his few spells to use or re-use next based on each new thing he learns in the adventure, regardless of any predictions.

Sorcerers and wizards often disagree; wizards tend to think of sorcerers as sloppy and undisciplined, while sorcerers can consider wizards obsessive and distant.

Kobolds, wild elves, Chaos Gnomes (a subrace of Gnomes introduced in the Races of Stone supplement), Diaboli (an obscure race of anarchists from the Mystara Campaign setting, updated in Dragon magazine #327), and Spellscales (a humanoid draconic race from the Races of the Dragon supplement) all have Sorcerer as their favored class.

Among the "iconic characters" developed for the 3rd edition to illustrate the different classes within the artwork of the rulebooks, Hennet, a user of wild magic was chosen as the sorcerer.

=== Dungeons & Dragons 4th edition ===
Sorcerers were among the classes presented in the 4th edition Player's Handbook II and expanded on in Arcane Power.

The sorcerer is an arcane striker, with controller as a secondary role. Unlike other editions of the game, 4e sorcerers now have their own list of spells, rather than the same spells as the wizard. Sorcerers' attack spells generally use charisma; furthermore, many sorcerer spells benefit from high strength or dexterity. Sorcerers' sole class feature is spell source; there are several versions of spell source, one of which must be selected during character creation. Each version of spell source gives the sorcerer resistance to one damage type (which is fixed or variable depending on the version of spell source), provides a damage bonus based on either dexterity or strength, and gives the sorcerer at least one additional benefit specific to that version of spell source. If spell source is strength-based, it allows the sorcerer to use strength instead of dexterity or intelligence to determine AC while wearing light armor. Furthermore, many sorcerer powers have additional effects if a sorcerer has a specific version of spell source. In Player's Handbook II, two versions of spell source are presented: dragon magic and wild magic. Dragon magic refers to the belief that some sorcerers have draconic blood in their veins. Wild magic refers to a random, uncontainable magic that the sorcerer can tap into. In addition, the supplement Arcane Power introduces two more versions of spell source: storm magic and cosmic magic.

=== Dungeons & Dragons 5th edition ===
Sorcerers are born with an innate magic, one they did not choose but cannot deny. [...] Most sorcerers find themselves drawn to a life of adventure sooner rather than later. The magic in their veins does not like to lie dormant. Those who don't learn to channel their power may find their gifts spilling out anyway, in unexpected and often unpleasant ways.

The sorcerer was included as a character class in the 5th edition Player's Handbook with different subclasses defined by Sorcerous Origin. They are given two Sorcerous Origins to choose from: Draconic Bloodline and Wild Magic. Several sourcebooks since the launch of 5th edition have expanded the number of origin options. Sword Coast Adventurer's Guide (2015) added the Sorcerous Origin of Storm Sorcery, which was then reprinted in Xanathar's Guide to Everything (2017) along with two new options: Divine Soul and Shadow Magic. Tasha's Cauldron of Everything (2020) added two more origins: Aberrant Mind and Clockwork Soul.

Draconic Bloodline sorcery draws its power from a draconic magic in the character's blood, imbuing the sorcerer with certain traits of that particular dragon type. Wild Magic sorcery draws its power from the chaos of wild magic giving the character unpredictable, but powerful, spell effects. Storm Sorcery draws the power of the storm, giving sorcerers the power to control the weather. Divine Souls draw their power from a divine source which grants them healing abilities. Shadow Magic comes from the Shadowfell which taints the user with the power of darkness and shadows.

== Reception ==
For the 3.5 edition, Dungeons & Dragons For Dummies recommended the sorcerer over the wizard as a starting arcane spellcaster: "Where the sorcerer approaches spellcasting more as an art than a science, working through intuition rather than careful training and study, the wizard is all about research. For this reason, the wizard has a wider selection of spells to call upon, whereas the sorcerer tends to be a specialist. As such, the sorcerer is slightly easier to play".

Screen Rant rated the sorcerer class as the 5th most powerful class of the base 12 character classes in the 5th edition.

The Gamer rated the 5th edition sorcerer subclass Shadow Magic as the 6th most awesome subclass out of the 32 new character options in Xanathar's Guide to Everything.

Gus Wezerek, for FiveThirtyEight, reported that of the 5th edition "class and race combinations per 100,000 characters that players created on D&D Beyond from" August 15 to September 15, 2017, sorcerers were second to last in player creations at 7,587 total. Humans (1,324) were the most common racial combination followed by half-elf (1,258) and then tiefling (1,062). Wezerek wrote "when I started playing 'Dungeons & Dragons' five years ago, I never would have chosen the game’s most popular match: the human fighter. There are already enough human fighters in movies, TV and books — my first character was an albino dragonborn sorcerer. But these days I can get behind the combo’s simplicity".

== General bibliography ==
- Cook, Monte; Tweet, Jonathan; Williams, Skip (2000). Player's Handbook. Wizards of the Coast. ISBN 0-7869-1550-1.
