= Matt Cavotta =

American artist and writer

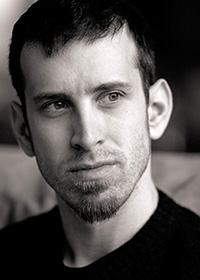
- Matt Cavotta
- Known for: Fantasy art, Illustration
- Spouse: Kylie

Matt Cavotta is an American artist and writer. His artwork is focused on the fantasy genre, with notable contributions to popular games such as Magic: The Gathering and Dungeons & Dragons.

== Career ==
Cavotta wrote a weekly column for MagicTheGathering.com called "Taste the Magic" from February 2005 to September 2007. The column focused on development of the world, art, characters, and other intellectual property for Magic, the first to do so comprehensively. He has also written and illustrated three unpublished children's books, and provided interior illustrations in Oriental Adventures, Manual of the Planes, and Deities and Demigods.

Cavotta is the second of three children born to his parents Mike ("Finn") and Maureen Cavotta, after his older brother Michael but before his younger sister Haley. Cavotta was raised in Moreland Hills, Ohio. He was educated at the Orange Schools in neighboring Pepper Pike, Ohio. He graduated from Orange High School in 1989. In his late high school days he played in several rock bands, mostly within the hard-rock and heavy metal genre.

Cavotta is a graduate of the Columbus College of Art & Design, with a focus on painting and illustration.

After an early art career that included freelance illustration and successful projects in toy development, Cavotta gained notoriety for his Magic card illustrations. A lifelong hobby game player, he worked at Wizards of the Coast as Magic creative lead from 2004 to 2006.
