= Wizard (Dungeons & Dragons) =

Dungeons & Dragons character class

- Dungeons & Dragons character class

Editions
- Standard class: Original; Basic; 1st; 2nd; 3rd; v3.5; 4th; 5th; 5.5e

Publication history
- First appearance: Men & Magic
- Source books: Men and Magic; Basic Set; Player's Handbook (1978, 1989, 2000, 2003, 2008, 2014, 2024)
- Previous names: Magic-User (Original, Basic, 1st eds.); Mage (2nd ed.)

Grouping
- 1E base class: none
- 2E group: Wizard
- 4E powersource: Arcane
- 4E role: Controller

The wizard, formerly known as the magic-user or mage, is one of the standard character classes in the Dungeons & Dragons fantasy role-playing game. A wizard uses arcane magic, and is considered less effective in melee combat than other classes.

== Publication history ==
=== Creative origins ===
The Magic-User class was inspired by the spell-casting magicians common in folklore and modern fantasy literature, particularly as portrayed in Jack Vance's The Dying Earth short stories, and John Bellairs's novel The Face in the Frost. Gandalf and Saruman from Tolkien's The Lord of the Rings and Merlin of King Arthur fame also influenced this class.

Wizards memorize their spells, then forget them when cast in the fashion of magicians from Jack Vance's Dying Earth series of novels.

=== Dungeons & Dragons ===
In the original version of the game, magic-user was one of the base character classes. Magic-User was one of the three original classes, the other two being Fighting Man (renamed Fighter in later editions) and Cleric.

The Magic-User was physically weak and vulnerable but compensated for this with the potential to develop powerful spellcasting abilities. In practice a mid- to high-level Magic-User was a combination intelligence gatherer and walking artillery, gathering information about possible dangers not yet seen and augmenting the physical combat abilities of the other classes with potentially devastating long-range and area attacks.

=== Advanced Dungeons & Dragons 1st edition ===
"Magic-user" was one of the five core character classes available in the first edition Advanced Dungeons & Dragons (AD&D) Player's Handbook.

The 1st Edition of AD&D also included a subclass of the magic-user called the illusionist, which had different spell lists, different experience level tables, and slightly fewer maximum hit dice (10 instead of 11). Gnomes were also able to become illusionists, even though only humans, elves, and half-elves could become magic-users. Magic-user spells and illusionist spells were for the most part separated and had little overlap. Of all the AD&D classes, only the magic-user had spells of the 8th and 9th levels; all other spell-casting classes were limited to spells of up to the 7th level.

=== Dungeons & Dragons ===
"Magic-User" continued to be used in the basic Dungeons & Dragons rules set.

=== Advanced Dungeons & Dragons 2nd edition ===
Opposition schools in 2nd Edition
Alteration	Illusion	Enchantment
Divination	✵	Conjuration
Invocation	Necromancy	Abjuration

The mage, as part of the "wizard" group, was one of the standard character classes available in the second edition Player's Handbook. The second edition of AD&D discarded the term "Magic-User" in favor of "mage".

The second edition Player's Handbook gives a few examples of mages from legend and myth: Merlin, Circe and Medea.

In this edition, the mage became an all-purpose wizard who could cast any wizardly spell, including many only available to illusionists in the first edition, like color spray and chromatic orb. The wizard spell list was unified, and illusionists became one of many specialist wizard types who focussed on a specific "school" of magic. The other specialists were abjurers, conjurers, diviners, enchanters, invokers, necromancers and transmuters. As a trade-off for various bonuses with magic from their chosen school, specialists became unable to cast spells from one or more "opposition" schools. Aside from school restrictions, all wizards could cast spells from up to 9th level, assuming they had the required intelligence.

The Complete Wizard's Handbook was published in 1990, written by Rick Swan. It detailed the schools of magic (illusion, necromancy etc.) and the careers a wizard might have (such as alchemist or treasure-hunter), added new spells to the wizard list, and introduced rules for spell research, adjudicating illusions, and casting spells in unusual conditions. The book also introduced wizard "kits": character packages with role-playing hooks linked to game benefits and limitations. Examples of wizard kits include the Academician, the Anagokok, the Amazon Sorceress and the Witch.

The Tome of Magic (1991) introduced elementalists, specialist wizards who focussed on spells related to one of the classical elements of air, earth, fire or water, and wild magic, which promised greater power at the cost of a built-in chance of backfire and other side effects.

=== Dungeons & Dragons 3rd edition ===
The 3rd edition renamed the mage to "Wizard". The term "magic user" is rarely used in this edition of the game, and when it is used it is usually a synonym for an arcane spellcaster or for an arcane spellcasting character class.

A similar paradigm of spell schools was retained for the 3rd edition of D&D as well. Despite removing the restrictions on race/class combinations, D&D 3.0 edition retained the gnomish affinity for becoming illusionists by making illusionist (not wizard) the gnome's favored class. This was dropped in the 3.5 edition in favor of bard.

The Iconic wizard is Mialee, a female elf.

=== Dungeons & Dragons 4th edition ===
The wizard is available as a character class in the game's fourth edition. The wizard utilizes the Arcane power source and is a Controller, which means the wizard focuses on multi-target damage spells, as well as debuffing foes and altering the battlefield's terrain.

The mage is a similar class offered in the Essentials sourcebook Heroes of the Fallen Lands. Instead of implement mastery, the mage focuses on a primary and secondary school of magic. Mages have access to all the same wizard powers, however. The bladesinger, witch, and sha'ir were also released as alternative wizard classes.

Spell schools are initially absent in 4th edition but were reintroduced with the Dungeons & Dragons Essentials supplement, allowing wizards to gain advantage when casting the spells of two schools of their choosing. The spell schools introduced are Enchantment, Evocation, Illusion, Necromancy, and Nethermancy (corresponding to the Shadow subschool of the Illusion school from the previous editions). The spells of other classical schools are present in the form of utility spells (like True Seeing being available but not being specifically named a Divination spell) or spell descriptors (like Conjuration or Summoning). However, since 4th edition does not use a Vancian spellcasting system, the benefits of mastering or being an expert in a school work quite differently.

=== Dungeons & Dragons 5th edition ===
The wizard has been included as a character class in the 5th edition Player's Handbook. Players must choose an Arcane Tradition for their wizard character at second level, each of which represents one of the eight schools of magic: abjuration, conjuration, divination, enchantment, evocation, illusion, necromancy and transmutation.

School	Emphasis	Name
Abjuration	Blocking, banishing, protecting	Abjurer
Conjuration	Produce creatures or objects from another plane	Conjurer
Divination	Understanding the past, present and future	Diviner
Enchantment	Entrancing and beguiling	Enchanter
Evocation	Raw combative power and damage	Evoker
Illusion	Sensory deception and trickery	Illusionist
Necromancy	Curses, creating undead thralls	Necromancer
Transmutation	Changing energy and matter	Transmuter

Several sourcebooks since the launch of the 5th edition have expanded the number of Arcane Tradition options. Sword Coast Adventurer's Guide (2015) added the Bladesinging tradition which was originally exclusive to elves and half-elves. Xanathar's Guide to Everything (2017) added one additional arcane tradition: War Magic. This subclass focuses on empowering spells and enhancing a wizard's defense to prepare them for war. Explorer's Guide to Wildemount (2020) added 15 new dunamancy spells and two additional arcane traditions: Chronurgy and Graviturgy. Tasha's Cauldron of Everything (2020) reprinted an updated version of the Bladesinger and added one new tradition: Order of Scribes. This version of the Bladesinging tradition removed the Forgotten Realms specific racial restrictions and revised several spells. On these changes, Lead Rules Designer Jeremy Crawford said: "We decided that if we're going to bring in Bladesinging, then we should bring in the cantrips that we originally designed to go along with that subclass. So that's the main reason those cantrips appear in this book. Then, in the process of bringing them over, we decided to make a few tweaks to those spells so that the wording would better align with our original design intent".

== Spell preparation and casting ==
Wizards cast their spells by using their acquired magical knowledge (augmented by their Intelligence score) and experience. In particular, they learn most new spells by seeking out magical writings and copying them into their spellbooks, a method that allows them (unlike sorcerers) to master any number of permissible spells once they find them, assembling a broad and versatile arsenal of power. Many wizards see themselves not only as spell casters but also as philosophers, inventors, and scientists, studying a system of natural laws that are for the most part unknown and undiscovered. Once the 3rd edition introduced skills to D&D, wizards' best skills became those that involved either magic or other scholarly or applied knowledge such as history, nature, and geography.

Mechanic	Description
Memorization / Preparation	In order to prepare spells from their spellbooks, wizards need comfortable quiet areas to study. The spell is read, spoken, or memorized up until the trigger. This is the easiest and most efficient way to cast arcane magic as a wizard because it means the wizard needs only to perform the trigger element of the spell when the need arises to cast it. There may be a temporal limit in spell casting and this could be the reason why wizards can only cast a certain number of spells of various degrees in one day. A weakness of wizards is that they cannot cast an arcane spell that they have not prepared, so they are extremely vulnerable if caught in a situation they did not expect. To minimize this, wizards often develop their problem-solving ability to anticipate which spells may be most useful.
Casting	When the need calls for a certain spell to be cast, wizards will allow their thoughts to retreat back into their consciousness in order to obtain it. When they find the spell they want, wizards will then complete the trigger sequence. This is the common view of a wizard casting: voicing several strange words, utilizing some arcane component, and perhaps making some sort of quirky hand movement. In actuality every part of the sequence must be exact or else the wizard may miscast, misfire, cast an entirely different spell, or cast nothing at all.
Resting	Wizards need to rest prior to spellcasting. This may be in the form of sleep or meditation. A short or long rest can allow a wizard to recover spell slots, however in later editions, wizards "are always capable of using some minor magics, meaning you’ll never see a wizard forced to take up a crossbow".
Unprepared and Daily spells, and Rituals (4th edition)	In the 4th edition, wizards only needed to prepare their most powerful attack spells, those which could be used only once a day, and their utility spells. Generally, a wizard had two spells to choose from for each daily and utility power slot; however the Expanded Spellbook and the "Remembered Wizardry" feats increased this number to three or four with both, and non-wizard spells, including those from wizard-exclusive feats, paragon paths and epic destinies, could not be swapped out in this way. Their less powerful spells could be used per encounter or at will, without preparation or selection beforehand. In addition, wizards performed most noncombat magics (such as opening locks, specialized healing, or transportation) through extended rituals requiring many minutes of work though no particular preparation. Although rituals were not exclusive to Wizards, they were one of the two PHB classes who gained Ritual Caster feat automatically as a class feature, and were the only one of the eight classes which learned free rituals as they increased in level.

== School specialization ==
Wizards may specialize in one or more of eight schools of magic, choosing their specialty at 1st level. Specialization was introduced in the 2nd Edition of D&D (although the 1st Edition included the Illusionist as a separate class similar to wizards). In Edition 3.5, specialist wizards can prepare one extra spell from their chosen school per spell level each day, while as a consequence of their more focused studies, they also give up the use of two schools of magic other than Divination (note: specialists in Divination only give up one school). There is the "Master Specialist" that allows a wizard even greater power in one school, but it also further reduces their range of spells to choose from.

The eight schools of magic are:

- Abjuration: spells of protection, blocking, and banishing. Specialists are called abjurers.
- Conjuration: spells that bring creatures or materials. Specialists are called conjurers.
- Divination: spells that reveal information. Specialists are called diviners.
- Enchantment: spells that magically imbue the target or give the caster power over the target. Specialists are called enchanters.
- Evocation: spells that manipulate energy or create something from nothing. Specialists are called evokers.
- Illusion: spells that alter perception or create false images. Specialists are called illusionists.
- Necromancy: spells that manipulate life or life force. Specialists are called necromancers.
- Transmutation: spells that transform the target. Specialists are called transmuters.

Some spells do not fall into these schools, and are called Universal spells. These spells are available to all wizards, and this "school" cannot be taken as a specialty school or given up for another specialty.

A limited number of rule supplements allowed wizard specialization outside of these schools. The 2nd edition books Tome of Magic and Player's Option: Spells & Magic called the existing schools "philosophies" and introduced schools based on "effect": the dimensionalist, elementalist, force mage, mentalist, and shadow mage. Other schools, based on "thaumaturgy" were the alchemist, artificer, geomancer, song mage, and wild mage, which overlapped with skills that would later be assigned to other classes. Third and fifth editions both included wizards that specialized in combat: the war mage and bladesinger. Some campaign settings included wizard specializations based on the flavour of the setting, such as wu jen in east-Asian themed settings.

== Campaign settings ==
=== Dark Sun ===
Dark Sun world wizards include defilers, whose powers come at the expense of the ecosystem; preservers, who wield magic in concert with the environment; and illusionists, specialists in illusory effects who may be either defilers or preservers. Owing to the scarcity of natural resources, few wizards have access to books made of paper pages and hard covers; instead, they record their spells with string patterns and complex knots.

=== Dragonlance ===
Wizard specialization was introduced in the AD&D book Dragonlance Adventures (1987) where Krynn wizards were "divided into good (white), neutral (red), and evil (black) variants. Slightly different spheres of magic [were] available to these different classes" which was a preview into spell specialization for wizards that was later introduced in 2nd Edition. This supplement also introduced the idea of Krynn wizards being impacted by the phases of the moons.

=== Exandria ===
In Exandria, wizards can access dunamancy which "involves the manipulation of entropy, gravity, and time" where "dunamancers draw power from alternate timelines and unseen realities, subtly affect the flow of time, and even tighten or loosen the grip of gravity". While dunamancy acts as a source of magic, the spells fit within the pre-existing schools of magic. Dunamancy was originally created by Matthew Mercer for Critical Role, a Dungeons & Dragons web series, and then was added to the canon in the 5th edition sourcebook Explorer's Guide to Wildemount (2020). Explorer's Guide to Wildemount added two dunamancer subclasses for wizards (Chronurgy and Graviturgy) and dunamancy themed spells.

== Reception ==
For the 3.5 edition, Dungeons & Dragons For Dummies recommended the sorcerer over the wizard as a starting arcane spellcaster: "Where the sorcerer approaches spellcasting more as an art than a science, working through intuition rather than careful training and study, the wizard is all about research. For this reason, the wizard has a wider selection of spells to call upon, whereas the sorcerer tends to be a specialist. As such, the sorcerer is slightly easier to play". However, in Dungeons and Dragons 4th Edition For Dummies, the wizard is now the example starting arcane spellcaster: "Spellcasting can be tricky, but every party needs a spellcaster, and the rewards for playing one can be high. If you want to play a character with a mysterious nature and a selection of powerful spells at the ready, then the wizard is the class for you".

Gus Wezerek, for FiveThirtyEight, reported that of the 5th edition "class and race combinations per 100,000 characters that players created on D&D Beyond from" August 15 to September 15, 2017, wizards were the 3rd most created at 9,855 total. Elf (2,744) was the most common racial combination followed by human (2,568) and then gnome (1,360).

Screen Rant rated the wizard class as the most powerful class of the base 12 character classes in the 5th edition. "The squishiest of all classes gets the number one slot. [...] But while it’s true that a gentle breeze could knock over a wizard, with the number of spells they have, their ability to strike back more than makes up for it. [...] Playing a Wizard can be a bit complicated at first, but with their ability to learn pretty much any spell, it’s worth it. Players wanting to play these cats should keep in mind that one of the most important things about playing Wizards is just making sure they have the right spells prepared. That’s probably half of the battle with this class".

James Hanna, for CBR, highlighted that the 5E Bladesinger subclass from Sword Coast Adventurer's Guide (2015) had weaker action economy compared to other melee-spellcasters such as the Paladin or the Eldritch Knight Fighter since the "Bladesinger essentially had to choose whether to use two attacks or cast one cantrip for slightly higher damage". However, the revised version of the subclass in Tasha's Cauldron of Everything (2020) has a more "flexible action economy" since the Extra Attack feature now allows the Bladesinger to cast a cantrip with one of their attacks. Hanna wrote, "As Wizards, it makes sense that they should have greater control over their spellcasting than Eldritch Knights, and now they do. The rule means that a Bladesinger can cast Green-Flame Blade or Booming Blade, then make their extra attack too. Or, they could cast True Strike to gain advantage on the second attack, and the list goes on". Christian Hoffer, for ComicBook, highlighted that changes to the cantrips originally released with the Bladesinger subclass essentially nerf the Booming Blade cantrip in multiple ways by preventing synergy with features such as the spell sniper feat, the shadow blade spell and sorcerer Twinned or Distant metamagic options.

== See also ==
- Magic of Dungeons & Dragons
- The Complete Wizard's Handbook
