= Justine Mara Andersen =

American artist

Justine Mara Andersen (born Dennis Cramer) is an American artist, illustrator, animator, and poet, whose work has appeared in role-playing games and comic books.

== Works ==
Andersen has produced interior illustrations for many Dungeons & Dragons books and Dragon magazine since 1995, such as Player's Option: Spells & Magic (1996), The Sunless Citadel (2000), and the 3rd edition Fiend Folio (2003).

She also created the erotic comic Mara of the Celts from Eros Comix.

She has created works for DC Comics, Image Comics, Lucasfilm, and Barbarella.

She also has animations published on YouTube, including works to support elephants and indigenous folk in India, and works for the University of Florida.

== Personal life ==
Justine Mara Andersen is a transgender woman, and before coming out mainly published works under birth name Dennis Cramer and pseudonym Dennis Crabapple McClain.

Andersen is currently an illustrator for Magic: The Gathering and Dungeons & Dragons, and has a personal website.
