= Greyhawk deities =

Characters in Dungeons & Dragons

The legion of fictional deities in the World of Greyhawk campaign setting for the Dungeons & Dragons fantasy roleplaying game covers an extensive range of spheres of influence, allowing players to customize the spiritual beliefs and powers of their characters, and as well as giving Dungeon Masters a long list of gods from which to design evil temples and minions. Although the Greyhawk campaign world, when it was merely a home game, started with no specific gods, the value of having deities available for both players and game plot purposes was quickly realized. The number of deities has varied with each version of the campaign world that has been published, but for many years numbered a few dozen. It has only been since 1999 that the number of gods increased dramatically to almost 200, due to the volume of newly published material that was subsequently integrated into the campaign world.

== Greyhawk as a home campaign: very few deities ==
When Dungeons & Dragons was developed in the early 1970s by Gary Gygax and Dave Arneson, one of the archetypal character classes in the original game was the cleric, a character who received divine powers from "the gods". However, when Gygax started to build his own campaign world called Greyhawk, one facet of culture that he did not address was organized religion. Since his campaign was largely built around the needs of lower-level characters, he didn't think specific deities were necessary, since direct interaction between a god and a low-level character was very unlikely. Some of his players took matters into their own hands, calling upon Norse or Greek gods such as Odin or Zeus, or even Conan's Crom in times of dire need. However, some of the players wanted Gygax to create and customize a specific deity so that cleric characters could receive their divine powers from someone less ambiguous than "the gods". Gygax, with tongue in cheek, created two gods: Saint Cuthbert—who brought non-believers around to his point of view with whacks of his cudgel —and Pholtus, whose fanatical followers refused to believe that any other gods existed. Because both of these deities represented aspects of Good, Gygax eventually created a few evil deities to provide some villainy.

In Gygax's serialized novella The Gnome Cache, which was set in Greyhawk, a shrine to St. Cuthbert (spelled "St. Cuthburt") is mentioned; this was the first published reference to a Greyhawk deity.

== Greyhawk deities and the folio edition ==
In 1980, TSR published Gygax's home campaign world as a 32-page folio, World of Greyhawk (known as the "folio edition" to differentiate it from later versions). However, Gygax did not include any details of the deities he used in his home campaign at this time.

Several adventure modules were quickly published to support the folio edition, and one of them, C1 The Hidden Shrine of Tamoachan, featured the first deities designed specifically for a World of Greyhawk setting. The adventure was designed to introduce players to the Aztec-like Olman humans of the Amedio Jungle, a subject not covered in the folio edition. The Olman deities—largely drawn from Aztec culture—were Mictlantecuhtli, god of death, darkness, murder and the underworld; Tezcatlipoca, god of sun, moon, night, scheming, betrayals and lightning; and Quetzalcoatl, god of air, birds and snakes. However, Gygax did not acknowledge these deities in any of his work on Greyhawk, and TSR did not publish any further references or adventures using this setting, effectively "orphaning" the Olman culture. The Olman deities were not included in any versions of the Greyhawk campaign setting until they reappeared in 1999 in The Scarlet Brotherhood by Sean K. Reynolds and in 2005 in the extensive list of deities published for the Living Greyhawk campaign.

Lacking any Greyhawk-specific deities in the folio edition, many Dungeon Masters using the World of Greyhawk setting borrowed generic deities from the just-published rulebook Deities and Demigods for their Greyhawk campaigns. However, relief was in sight. In the August 1982 issue of Dragon (Issue 64), Gygax gave advice on how to adapt the 23 non-human deities from Deities and Demigods to the Greyhawk world, and he included a description of the first non-human deity designed specifically for Greyhawk, Raxivort (god of the goblin-like xvarts). A few months later, Gygax then published a long and very detailed five-part article in the November 1982 to March 1983 issues (Issues 67-71) of Dragon that outlined a pantheon of deities custom-made for worship by humans in the world of Greyhawk. In addition to his original Greyhawk deities, St. Cuthbert and Pholtus, Gygax added 17 more deities:

Good	Neutral	Evil
St. Cuthbert (forthrightness)	Celestian (stars)	Hextor (war)
Pholtus (resolution)	Fharlanghn (travel)	Iuz (oppression)
Heironeous (chivalry)	Istus (fate)	Erythnul (slaughter)
Ehlonna (forest)	Obad-hai (nature)	Incabulos (plague)
Trithereon (liberty)	Boccob (magic)	Nerull (death)
Zagyg (humour)	Olidammara (music)	Ralishaz (madness)
		Wastri (bigotry)

Gygax also used the hierarchy of deities as set out in the just-published Deities and Demigods rule book: greater god, lesser god, demi-god. (Later, he would add two ranks below demi-god: quasi-deity, and hero-deity.) Although later versions of the campaign setting would assign most of these deities to worship by specific races of humans, at this time they were generally worshipped by all humans of the Flanaess.

== Greyhawk deities in the boxed set: Four human pantheons ==
In 1983, the folio edition was replaced by the greatly expanded World of Greyhawk boxed set. Gygax was not only able to include the nineteen new gods from his previously published Dragon articles, he also included 31 new gods, for a total of 50 deities. However, although the material regarding the 19 original deities was reprinted in full, only three of the "new" deities were also given a full description: Raxivort (whose full description had been published in Dragon the previous year), Ulaa and Xan Yae. The remainder of the new deities were simply listed by name and sphere of influence.

All but one of these deities—Raxivort being the exception—was primarily a human deity. By his own admission, Gygax's vision of Greyhawk (and of D&D) was of a human-centred world. In Gygax's original Dragon articles, he had made no mention of racial preferences for any of the gods; now the boxed set introduced four main human races: Suel, Oeridian, Bakluni and Flannae, and assigned most of the deities to be primarily worshipped by one or other of these races. The twelve deities of the Suel pantheon had been created by Len Lakofka, and he would subsequently publish a detailed five-part article on them in the July–November 1984 issues (#87–92) of Dragon. Most of the other gods were assigned to one of the three remaining pantheons, while a few were either declared common to all humans or of unknown origin:

Widely Worshipped	Baklunish	Oeridian	Flan	Suel	Unknown
Blerred (mines, Neutral)	Geshtai (rivers, Good)	Atroa (spring, Good)	Allitur (ethics, Good)	Beltar (malice, Evil)	Tharizdun (eternal darkness, Evil)
Boccob (magic, Neutral)	Istus (fate, Neutral)	Celestian (stars, Neutral)	Berei (family, Good)	Bralm (industriousness, Good)	Ulaa (hills, Good)
Ehlonna (forests, Good)	Xan Yae (shadows, Neutral)	Delleb (reason, Good)	Beory (Oerth Mother, Good)	Fortubo (stone, Good)	Wastri (bigotry, Evil)
Incabulos (plague, Evil)	Zuoken (physical & mental mastery, Neutral)	Erythnul (slaughter, Evil)	Iuz (oppression, Evil)	Kord (athletics, Good)
Joramy (volcanoes, Good)		Fharlanghn (travel, Neutral)	Nerull (death, Evil)	Lendor (time, Neutral)
Lirr (poetry, Good)		Heironeous (chivalry, Good)	Obad-hai (nature, Neutral)	Llerg (beasts, Neutral)
Myhriss (love, Good)		Hextor (war, Evil)	Pelor (sun, Good)	Norebo (luck, Neutral)
Olidammara (music, Neutral)		Kurell (jealousy, Neutral)	Rao (peace, Good)	Phaulkon (air, Good)
Ralishaz (madness, Evil)		Pholtus (resolution, Good)		Phyton (beauty, Good)
St. Cuthbert (forthrightness, Good)		Procan (oceans, Good)		Pyremius (murder, Evil)
Trithereon (liberty, Good)		Rudd (luck, Neutral)		Syrul (deceit, Evil)
Zagyg (humour, Good)		Sotillion (summer, Good)		Xerbo (sea, Neutral)
		Telchur (winter, Neutral)
		Velnius (weather, Neutral)
		Wenta (autumn, Good)
		Zilchus (power, Neutral)

== Additional deities ==
In February–June 1982, a year before the release of the boxed set, Roger E. Moore had published five articles in Dragon (Issues 58–62) describing deities of the non-human races available to players (elves, dwarves, halflings, gnomes, half-orcs) suitable for any generic Dungeons & Dragons campaign. In Issue 71 (March 1983), Gygax indicated that these twenty-four deities were now "Greyhawk legal"; this increased the number of Greyhawk deities from 50 to 74.

In the March 1983 issue (Issue 71) was an article detailing four unique characters of Greyhawk. The first two "quasi-deities"—Heward and Keoghtom—had been created by Gygax as non-player characters (NPCs—characters designed to interact with players). The third, Murlynd, was a character that had been created by Gygax's childhood friend Don Kaye before Kaye's untimely death in 1975. The fourth, a "hero-deity" named Kelanen, was developed to illustrate the "principle of advancement of power".

Heward, Keoghtom, and Murlynd were classified by Gygax as "quasi-deities," defined as "characters who have risen above the status of heroes, but who are not quite demi-gods." Other quasi-deities mentioned, but not detailed, included Daern, Johydee, Nolzur, Quall, and Tuerny. Kelanen was called a "Hero-Deity," defined as "one of the very powerful individuals who might, or might not, be a true deity."

With a few additions or deletions in subsequent versions of the campaign setting, the 50 human gods in the boxed set and most of Moore's non-human gods would form the core of Greyhawk deities for the next 22 years. However, Gygax's four quasi-deities would not be mentioned in any official Greyhawk material until 1998.

== Greyhawk rises "From the Ashes" ==
Gygax, creator of the world of Greyhawk, was forced out of TSR at the end of 1985. For several years after his departure, there was little or no change to the world of Greyhawk, and the 1983 boxed set continued to be the campaign setting. Then in 1992, TSR released a new Greyhawk setting, From the Ashes. All of the human deities from the previous editions were kept, and one new demigod, Mayaheine, was added. However, only the 7 greater gods, 18 intermediate gods and 6 demigods were given a full text description; the 29 lesser gods only received a single line on a summary chart.

For non-human deities, the 24 from Roger E. Moore's Dragon articles were kept, and a further 9 goblinoid and giant deities were added from the Deities and Demigods rulebook. However, the non-human gods were also simply listed in the summary chart; their full descriptions could be found in Moore’s original articles in back issues of Dragon, in Unearthed Arcana, or the old Deities & Demigods rulebook. The sourcebook Monster Mythology, written by the same author as From the Ashes (Carl Sargent), was released earlier the same year, providing extensive details on these nonhuman pantheons for those without access to those earlier sources, as well as introducing many new nonhuman gods to the game. Deities introduced for the first time in Monster Mythology include the elven goddess Sehanine Moonbow, who is mentioned prominently in From the Ashes.

Altogether, "From the Ashes" increased the total number of deities to 92.

Greater human deities in "From the Ashes"

Widely Worshipped	Baklunish	Oeridian	Flan	Suel
Boccob (magic, Neutral)	Istus (fate, Neutral)	Pelor (sun, Good)	Beory (Oerth Mother, Neutral)	Nerull (murder, Evil)
Incabulos (plague, Evil)		Rao (peace, Good)

Intermediate human deities in "From the Ashes"

Widely Worshipped	Oeridian	Flan	Suel	Unknown
Ehlonna (forests, Good)	Celestian(stars, Neutral)	Obad-hai (nature, Neutral)	Kord (athletics, Good)	Tharizdun (eternal darkness, Evil)
Ulaa (hills, Good)	Erythnul (slaughter, Evil)		Wee Jas (death, Neutral)	Lendor (time, Neutral)
Olidammara (music, Neutral)	Fharlanghn (travel, Neutral)
Ralishaz (madness, Evil)	Heironeous (chivalry, Good)
St. Cuthbert (forthrightness, Good)	Hextor (war, Evil)
Trithereon (liberty, Good)	Pholtus(resolution, Good)
	Procan (oceans, Good)
	Zilchus (money, Good)

Lesser human deities in "From the Ashes"

Widely Worshipped	Baklunish	Oeridian	Flan	Suel
Blerred (mines, Neutral)	Geshtai (rivers, Good)	Atroa (spring, Good)	Allitur (ethics, Good)	Beltar (malice, Evil)
Cyndor (time, Neutral)	Xan Yae (shadows, Neutral)	Delleb (reason, Good)	Berei (family, Good)	Bralm (industriousness, Good)
Joramy (volcanoes, Good)		Kurell (jealousy, Neutral)		Fortubo (stone, Good)
Lirr (poetry, Good)		Sotillion (summer, Good)		Llerg (beasts, Neutral)
Myhriss (love, Good)		Telchur (winter, Neutral)		Lydia (music, Good)
		Velnius (weather, Neutral)		Norebo (luck, Neutral)
		Wenta (autumn, Good)		Phaulkon (air, Good) (beauty, Good)
				Phyton
				Pyremius (murder, Evil)
				Syrul (deceit, Evil)
				Xerbo (sea, Neutral)

Human demi-deities in "From the Ashes"

Widely Worshipped	Baklunish	Oeridian	Flan	Unknown
Mayaheine (protection, Good)	Zuoken (physical & mental mastery, Neutral)	Rudd (luck, Neutral)	Iuz (oppression, Evil)	Wastri (bigotry, Evil)
Zagyg (humour, Good)

Demi-human deities in "From the Ashes" (the races that could be used by players)

Elves	Dwarves	Gnomes	Halflings
Corellon Larethian (magic)	Moradin (smithing)	Garl Glittergold (protection)	Yondalla (protection)
Sehanine Moonbow (mysticism)	Berronar Truesilver (home)	Baervan Wildwanderer (nature)	Arvoreen (vigilance)
Aerdrie Faenya (air)	Clangeddin Silverbeard (battle)	Baravar Cloakshadow (illusions)	Brandobaris (stealth)
Erevan Ilesere (trickster)	Dumathoin (mining)	Flandal Steelskin (mining)	Cyrrollalee (friendship)
Hanali Celanil (romance)	Muamman Duathal (travellers)	Gaerdal Ironhand (protection)	Sheela Peryroyl (agriculture)
Labelas Enoreth (time)	Vergadain (wealth)	Segojan Earthcaller (earth)
Solonor Thelandira (hunting)

== Greyhawk receives another makeover ==
The overall departure of the Greyhawk campaign from Gygax's original world to the darker vision set out in From the Ashes was not well-received by the public, and TSR stopped publishing Greyhawk material in 1993. Several years later, financially strapped by a cash-flow crisis, TSR was bought by Wizards of the Coast (WotC), and the moribund Greyhawk setting was revived.

In the Greyhawk Player's Guide published in 1998, the list of deities was expanded, although only human deities (and one monstrous god, Raxivort) were mentioned on page 19. The book notes on page 18 that "this is not a comprehensive list, even for humans, and includes very few demihuman or humanoid gods." Page 62 mentions two dwarven deities, Moradin and Clangeddin Silverbeard, who do not appear on that list, and directed interested readers to Unearthed Arcana or Monster Mythology for details on those gods.

Deities added to the setting in the Player's Guide include Al'Akbar, Daern, Kyuss, Dalt, Jascar, Osprem, Vatun, Zodal, Johydee, Kelanen, Keoghtom and Murlynd. (The latter three were the "quasi-deities" described by Gary Gygax back in Dragon in 1983, and also appearing in the Glossography in the 1983 boxed set.) In addition to Raxivort, the lesser god of xvarts, a new elvish demi-god, Ye'Cind (music, Good), was added, bringing the total number of deities appearing on page 19 to 74. However, none of the gods were given any description, leaving players to search for background information on worshippers and ethos in older published material.

The following year, the sourcebook The Scarlet Brotherhood by Sean K. Reynolds introduced a new human race, the Touv, and the nine gods of their pantheon. In addition, the sourcebook also included the quasi-Aztec Olman pantheon that had been introduced in 1980 but never used in campaign material.

== Third edition of D&D and Living Greyhawk ==
In 2000, WotC produced a new Third Edition of D&D, and made Greyhawk the default campaign setting for D&D—that is, unless a Dungeon Master specifically used a different campaign setting, it was assumed that his or her D&D game was set in the world of Greyhawk. Since Greyhawk was the default setting, the new gods were automatically added to the campaign pantheon. In addition, administrators of the Living Greyhawk shared world campaign that started in 2001 decided that every Greyhawk deity previously mentioned in any official source—human and non-human—as well as any god published by WotC in the future, would be a Greyhawk-legal deity. By 2005, this policy had almost tripled the total number of deities to 193; the list now covered every race found in the Greyhawk world, and almost every conceivable sphere of power was mentioned.

In 2008, the 4th edition of Dungeons and Dragons changed the default campaign setting from Greyhawk to an undefined "World", sometimes referred to as the "points of light" setting. Most of the deities of the new default pantheon are new, but a number of deities from Greyhawk, such as Pelor and Kord, are also included.

To date, WotC has not produced any new material for the Greyhawk world since the introduction of the 4th Edition, leaving the following list of Greyhawk deities unchanged for the time being:

== 3rd edition List of Greyhawk Deities ==
=== Associated with humans ===
==== Greater deities ====
Widely Worshipped	Baklunish	Oeridian	Flan	Olman
Boccob (magic, Neutral)	Istus (fate, Neutral)	Pelor (sun, Good)	Beory (Oerth Mother, Neutral)	Mictlantecuhtli, death (Evil)
Incabulos (plague, Evil)		Rao (peace, Good)	Nerull (murder, Evil)	Quetzalcoatl (air, Neutral)
				Tezcatlipoca (betrayals, Evil)

==== Intermediate deities ====
Widely Worshipped	Oeridian	Flan	Suel	Olman	Touv	Unknown
Ehlonna (forests, Good)	Celestian (stars, Neutral)	Obad-hai (nature, Neutral)	Kord (athletics, Good)	Huhueteotl (fire, Evil)	Nola (sun)	Tharizdun (eternal darkness, Evil)
Ulaa (hills, Good)	Erythnul (slaughter, Evil)		Lendor (time, Neutral)	Tlaloc (rain, Evil)	Vogan (weather, Good)
Olidammara (music, Neutral)	Fharlanghn (travel, Neutral)		Wee Jas (death, Neutral)
Ralishaz (madness, Evil)	Heironeous (chivalry, Good)
St. Cuthbert (forthrightness, Good)	Hextor (war, Evil)
Trithereon (liberty, Good)	Pholtus (resolution, Good)
	Procan (oceans, Good)
	Zilchus (money, Good)

==== Lesser deities ====
Widely Worshipped	Baklunish	Oeridian	Flan	Suel	Touv	Olman
Blerred (mines, Neutral)	Geshtai (rivers, Good)	Atroa (spring, Good)	Allitur (ethics, Good)	Beltar (malice, Evil)	Berna (forgiveness, Good)	Camazotz (vampires, Evil)
Cyndor (time, Neutral)	Mouqol (trade, Neutral)	Delleb (reason, Good)	Berei (family, Good)	Bralm (industriousness, Good)	Katay (decay, Neutral)
Joramy (volcanoes, Good)	Xan Yae (shadows, Neutral)	Kurell (jealousy, Neutral)	Vecna (destruction, Evil)	Dalt (portals, Good)	Kundo (building, Good)
Myhriss (love, Good)		Sotillion (summer, Good)	Zodal (mercy, Good)	Fortubo (stone, Good)	Meyanok (serpents, Evil)
Lirr (poetry, Good)		Telchur (winter, Neutral)		Jascar (mountains, Good)	Xanag (metals, Neutral)
		Velnius (weather, Neutral)		Llerg (beasts, Neutral)
		Wenta (autumn, Good)		Lydia (music, Good)
				Norebo (luck, Neutral)
				Osprem (sea voyages, Neutral)
				Phaulkon (air, Good) (beauty, Good)
				Phyton
				Pyremius (murder, Evil)
				Syrul (deceit, Evil)
				Vatun (barbarians, Neutral)
				Xerbo (sea, Neutral)

==== Demigods ====
Widely Worshipped	Baklunish	Oeridian	Flan	Touv	Unknown
Mayaheine (protection, Good)	Al'Akbar (guardianship, Good)	Merikka (agriculture, Good)	Iuz (oppression, Evil)	Damaran (vermin, Evil)	Earth Dragon (earth, Evil)
Zagyg (humour, Good)	Zuoken (physical & mental mastery, Neutral)	Rudd (luck, Neutral)		Vara (nightmares, Evil)	Wastri (bigotry, Evil)
		Stern Alia (law, Neutral)

==== Hero-gods ====
Baklunish	Oeridian	Flan	Suel	Unknown
Azor'alq (light, Good)	Daern (fortifications, Neutral)	Kuroth (theft, Neutral)	Nazarn (public combat, Neutral)	Heward (bards, Good)
Daoud (humility, Neutral)	Johydee (espionage, Good)	Vathris (anguish, Neutral)		Kelanen (swords, Neutral)
	Murlynd (magical "technology", Good)			Keoghtom (extraplanar heroism, Good)
				Kyuss (mastery of undead, Evil)
				Tsolorandril (wave motions, Neutral)

=== Deities associated with demihumans ===
==== Greater deities ====
Elves	Dwarves	Gnomes	Halflings	Orcs	Drow
Corellon Larethian (Magic, Good)	Moradin (smithing, Good)	Garl Glittergold (protection, Good)	Yondalla (protection, Good)	Gruumsh (war, evil)	Lolth (spiders, evil)

==== Intermediate deities ====
Elves	Dwarves	Gnomes	Halflings	Orcs
Aerdrie Faenya (air)	Abbathor (greed, Evil)	Baervan Wildwanderer (forests, Good)	Arvoreen (protection, Good)	Bahgtru(strength, Evil)
Deep Sashelas (aquatic elves)	Berronar Truesilver (safety, Good)	Callarduran Smoothhands (protection, Neutral)	Cyrrollalee (friendship, Good)	Ilneval (warfare, Evil)
Erevan Ilesere (mischief)	Clanggedin Silverbeard (battle, Good)	Flandal Steelskin (mining, Good)	Sheela Peryroyl (agriculture, Good)	Luthic female (fertility, Evil)
Hanali Celanil (love)	Dumathoin (exploration, Neutral)	Gaerdal Ironhand (vigilance, Good)		Shargaas (stealth, Evil)
Labelas Enoreth (time)	Vergadain (wealth, Neutral)	Segojan Earthcaller (earth, Good)		Yurtrus (disease, Evil)
Rillifane Rallathil (wood elves)	Laduguer (duergar, Evil)	Urdlen (greed, Evil)
Sehanine Moonbow (mysticism)
Solonor Thelandira (hunting)

==== Lesser deities ====
Elves	Dwarves	Gnomes	Halflings
Fenmarel Mestarine (wild elves, Neutral)	Dugmaren Brightmantle (scholarship, Good)	Baravar Cloakshadow (illusions, Good)	Brandobaris (stealth, Neutral)
	Muamman Duathal (travellers, Good)

==== Demi-deities ====
Elves	Halflings	Drow
Ye'Cind (music & magick, Good)	Urogalan (death, Neutral)	Keptolo (flattery, Evil)
		Kiaransalee (slavery, Evil)
		Zinzerena (assassination, Evil)

==== Hero-deities ====
Elves	Dwarves	Gnomes	Halflings
Gadhelyn (outlawry, Neutral)	Gendwar Argrim (obsession Neutral)	Roykyn (cruelty, Evil)	Charmalaine (keen senses, Good)

=== Deities associated with humanoids and other races ===
==== Greater deities ====
- Maglubiyet (goblins)

==== Intermediate deities ====
- Blibdoolpoolp (kuo-toa)
- Grolantor (hill giants, ettins, ogres)
- Hruggek (bugbears)
- Kurtulmak (kobolds)
- Skoraeus Stonebones (stone giants)
- Surtr (fire giants)
- Thrym (frost giants: cold)
- Io (Neutral Dragon God, father of Tiamat and Bahamut)

==== Lesser gods ====
- Bahamut (good dragons)
- Bargrivyek (goblins: cooperation and territory)
- Grankhul (bugbears: hunting)
- Khurgorbaeyag (goblins: slavery)
- Nomog-Geaya (hobgoblins: war)
- Raxivort (xvarts)
- Sekolah (sahuagin)
- Semuanya (lizardfolk)
- Skerrit (centaurs)
- Tiamat (evil dragons)
- Vaprak, (ogres and trolls)
- Yeenoghu (gnolls)

==== Demi-deities ====
- Laogzed (troglodytes)
