= List of Dungeons & Dragons deities =

Fictional deities in the Dungeons & Dragons role-playing game

This is a list of deities of Dungeons & Dragons, including all of the 3.5 edition gods and powers of the "Core Setting" for the Dungeons & Dragons (D&D) roleplaying game. Religion is a key element of the D&D game, since it is required to support both the cleric class and the behavioral aspects of the ethical alignment system – 'role playing', one of three fundamentals. The pantheons employed in D&D provide a useful framework for creating fantasy characters, as well as governments and even worlds. Dungeons and Dragons may be useful in teaching classical mythology. D&D draws inspiration from a variety of mythologies, but takes great liberty in adapting them for the purpose of the game. Because the Core Setting of 3rd Edition is based on the World of Greyhawk, the Greyhawk gods list contains many of the deities listed here, and many more.

== Publication history ==
=== 1976–1999 ===
The first official publication to detail god-like beings for use in the Dungeons & Dragons game was Gods, Demi-Gods & Heroes, published in 1976 as the fourth supplement for the original edition. This work was superseded by the Deities & Demigods sourcebook, which was first published in 1980. The first printing included the Cthulhu Mythos, but both this and the Melnibonéan mythos were removed by the third printing because of potential copyright issues. While some non-human deities originated in the Supplement I: Greyhawk (1975) and the Monster Manual (1977), Deities & Demigods and a series of articles in Dragon #58-63 (released in 1982) were the major sources for information on these deities and "brought the total nonhuman deity count up to about 50". In 1985, when the sourcebook was reprinted, Deities & Demigods was renamed Legends & Lore. On this change, Gary Gygax wrote it was due to "bowing to pressure from those who don't buy our products anyway" – Shannon Appelcline explained this was a reference to "fundamentalist religious groups, who had by then begun actively attacking TSR under names such as" Bothered About Dungeons & Dragons (B.A.D.D.). Nick Ozment of Black Gate highlighted the game did use "one aspect of Judeo-Christian myth: the devils and demons (although they can be found in many other mythologies as well)" so "puritanical fear mongers took this and ran with it". Ozment commented that "early editions were kinda silly" in terms of game mechanics for deities because even though the designers "assigned crazy-huge hit points and breathtakingly strong armor classes to the gods, said deities still had stats that could be overcome by powerful enough characters". He explained that "later editions of Deities and Demigods [...] ameliorated this 'big boss' mentality by introducing the concept that some gods that characters physically encountered were but avatars, 'aspects' or physical incarnations of gods who, being immortal and transcendent, could not really be killed".

In 1990, when Legends & Lore was revised for Advanced Dungeons & Dragons 2nd edition, the Babylonian, Finnish, nonhuman, and Sumerian content were removed to allow room for expansion of the remaining mythoi. Appelcline commented that this sourcebook "probably preserves more continuity from those 15 years of publication than any other D&D book". The disclaimer became stronger in this version of Legends & Lore by expanding from a general denial of philosophical intent to an explicit and detailed disavowal of religious judgment which Appelcline explained reflected TSR's heightened sensitivity to criticism from religious groups during Lorraine Williams' tenure. On the removed pantheons, he thought the "most surprising" was the removal of the nonhuman deities as "they represent some of the most original parts of the previous Deities & Demigods. However, TSR had decided that their first deities book should reflect the 'human experience'". Monster Mythology was then published in 1992 and it re-introduced detailed information on the deities of several non-human pantheons. This sourcebook "more than doubled the count of humanoid, demihuman, and monstrous deities".

The Faerûn pantheon for the Forgotten Realms campaign setting was more fully detailed in 1996–1998 with the publication of Faiths & Avatars (1996), Powers & Pantheons (1997) and Demihuman Deities (1998). Appelcline highlighted that many of the deities in Demihuman Deities either originated in Deities & Demigods or in Dragon articles, noting that means "about half of the Realms demihuman deities were created by Lawrence Schick and Roger E. Moore five to seven years before the Forgotten Realms became an official AD&D setting".

=== 2000–present ===
With the third edition of Dungeons & Dragons, a core pantheon was introduced; this was adapted from the Greyhawk pantheon. Deities and Demigods (2002) outlined various pantheons and included stat blocks for deities along with roleplay guidance on religions, the actions of deities in gameplay, and the creation of homebrew pantheons and religions. Co-designer James Wyatt explained that this sourcebook "owes a lot to the 1st Edition Deities and Demigods/Legends and Lore book, more so than the 2nd Edition version" but the introduction of "new material" meant not every pantheon could still be included so they "chose the pantheons that we felt were (a) most popular and (b) most ensconced in the popular culture of fantasy: the Greek, Norse, and Egyptian". Faiths and Pantheons (2002) was an abridged update of the previous Forgotten Realms deity focused trilogy; it uses the rules introduced in Deities and Demigods to outline "the portfolios of the many gods of the Realms" and adds stat blocks for "the avatars of the major deities". The sourcebook features a list of 115 Forgotten Realms gods, with "slight updates" for 3E compatibility. Appelcline thought its most notable addition was the inclusion of monstrous deities, such as the orc pantheon, which were previously detailed only in "non-Realms books like DMGR4: Monster Mythology (1992) and On Hallowed Ground (1996)". The Miniatures Handbook (2003) introduced 'aspects' for a number of deities, allowing players to use god figures in the Dungeons & Dragons Miniatures Game, while Dragon magazine articles and various other sources dealing with extraplanar entities added stats for further aspects.

The 4th Edition default pantheon included deities from the Greyhawk and the Forgotten Realms campaign settings, as well as several original gods. Although some gods are patrons of specific races, they are worshipped by all, and racial pantheons do not exist in this edition. Many lesser gods from previous editions (such as the Seldarine or most members of the dwarven pantheon) now have the status of Exarch, a demipower in service to a greater god.

The 5th Edition Players Handbook (2014) included lists of deities from the Forgotten Realms, Greyhawk, Dragonlance, Eberron, and the deities derived from historical pantheons such as the Celtic deities and Norse deities. The historical deities have been removed "from their historical context in the real world and united into pantheons that serve the needs of the game". The 5th Edition Dungeon Master's Guide (2014) later provided the "Dawn War Deities" as a sample pantheon, an updated version of the main pantheon of 4th Edition. These updates included readjusting some of the alignments, because 5th Edition returned to the previous schema of nine alignments, as well as adding suggested cleric domains of the available domains from the PHB and DMG. The Sword Coast Adventurer's Guide (2015) then gave a more detailed overview of all the deities from the Forgotten Realm, including nonhuman deities. A more detailed and expanded overview of nonhuman deities was printed in the Mordenkainen's Tome of Foes (2018).

== Characteristics ==
Deities in Dungeons & Dragons have a great variety of moral outlooks and motives, which have to be considered by cleric player characters. In some editions of the game, deities were given statistics, allowing mighty player characters to kill a god like a powerful monster. Every deity has certain aspects of existence over which it has dominion, power, and control. Collectively, these aspects represent a deity's portfolio. Additionally, each deity that can grant spells has multiple domains that give clerics access to extra spells and abilities from that domain. Which domains are associated with a deity is largely a function of the deity's portfolio.

=== Categories ===
The deities are grouped into three categories:

1. Core powers – Deities presented in the 3.5th edition Player's Handbook or substantially introduced in the other two core books (Dungeon Master's Guide and Monster Manual). Most of these deities are worshipped by humans. There is a subset within this category called Additional Deities which has deities not mentioned in the core rulebooks but instead in supplements and as such considered additions to the core category.
2. Alternate human pantheons – This lists the pantheons and the deities within them that are presented in the supplement book Deities & Demigods. Most are based upon real-life mythology.
3. Non-deity powers – These beings would fit into the previous category, but are not actually deities, plus most of them aren't the patron of a specific monstrous race. This includes the demon princes and archdevils as well as some other godlike beings.

Before third edition, there was no Core Setting, so the distinctions above are not as clear-cut. For the most part, materials which did not specify a setting were assumed to be at least compatible with the World of Greyhawk if not outright parts of the canon. As such, those prior materials are covered in the setting-specific lists of deities. The book Monster Mythology, however, was considered to be canon for core materials for the gods of non-human races in second edition.

=== Ranks of divine power ===
Each deity has a divine rank, which determines how much power the entity has, from lowest to highest:

- Quasi-deities or hero deities. Beings of this rank are immortal but usually cannot grant spells to worshippers.
- Demigods. They are the weakest of the deities, and are able to grant spells and perform a few deeds that are beyond mortal limits.
- Lesser deities (or Lesser powers). These entities can perform more powerful deeds than demigods can, and have keener senses where their portfolios are concerned.
- Intermediate deities (or Intermediate powers). These entities control larger godly realms than demigods or lesser gods.
- Greater deities (or Greater powers). These entities typically have millions of mortal worshippers, and they command respect even among other deities. Some rule over pantheons of other deities.
- Overdeities. These entities are beyond the understanding and knowledge of mortals and care nothing for worshippers.

Many deities are arranged in pantheons, which are often led by Greater deities which are their direct superiors. The individual deities in a pantheon may not be forced to obey their superiors, although they typically respect and fear the superior deity.

== Initial pantheons ==
Gods, Demi-Gods & Heroes (1976) included 10 pantheons of gods for Dungeons & Dragons. TSR then published the first version of Deities & Demigods (1980), for Advanced Dungeons & Dragons, which contained 17 pantheons of gods. This supplement updated the material which was included in 1976's Gods, Demi-Gods & Heroes for the original Dungeons & Dragons ruleset. Later printings removed the Cthulhu and Melnibonéan sections due to copyright concerns.

Included only in Gods, Demi-Gods & Heroes (1976)	Included only in Deities & Demigods (1980)	Included in both supplements
Aztec Mythos; Mayan Mythos; Hyborea Mythos (from Robert E. Howard's works)	American Indian mythos; Arthurian heroes; Babylonian mythos; Central American mythos; Cthulhu Mythos (from H. P. Lovecraft and related fiction); Nehwon mythos (from Fritz Leiber's Lankhmar novels); Nonhuman deities (created by TSR); Sumerian mythos	Celtic Mythos; Chinese mythos; Egyptian mythos; Finnish mythos; Greek mythos; Indian mythos; Japanese mythos; Melnibonéan Mythos (from Michael Moorcock's Elric novels); Norse mythos

== Advanced Dungeons & Dragons 2nd edition ==
In 1990, Legends & Lore (formerly titled Deities & Demigods) was expanded and fully revised from the 1st Edition AD&D volume to be used with the 2nd Edition rules. This edition had pared-down content in comparison to the original; the sections on Babylonian, Finnish, Sumerian and non-humanoid deities were wholly excised. The Central American mythos was changed to the Aztec mythos, while the Nehwon mythos was retained.

The book Monster Mythology (1992) included over 100 deities for nonhumans.

- Gods of the Demihumans
  - Gods of the Elves: Corellon Larethian, Sehanine Moonbow, Aerdrie Faenya, Erevan Ilesere, Fenmarel Mestarine, Hanali Celanil, Labelas Enoreth, Solonor Thelandira, Lafarallinn
  - Gods of the Dwarves: Moradin, Berronar Truesilver, Clanggedin Silverbeard, Dugmaren Brightmantle, Dumathoin, Muamman Duathal, Vergadain, Abbathor, Gnarldan Steelshield
  - Gods of the Gnomes: Garl Glittergold, Baervan Wildwanderer, Baravar Cloakshadow, Flandal Steelskin, Gaerdal Ironhand, Nebelun, Segojan Earthcaller, Urdlen
  - Gods of the Halflings: Yondalla, Arvoreen, Brandobaris, Cyrrollalee, Sheela Peryroyl, Urogalan, Kaldair Swiftfoot
- Goblinoid Deities
  - Gods of the Orcs: Gruumsh, Bahgtru, Ilneval, Luthic, Shargaas, Yurtrus, Gerdreg
  - Gods of the Goblins: Maglubiyet, Khurgorbaeyag, Nomog-Geaya, Bargrivyek
  - Gods of the Bugbears: Hruggek, Grankhul, Skiggaret
  - Gods of the Kobolds: Kurtulmak, Gaknulak
  - Other Goblinoid Deities: Kuraulyek, Meriadar, Stalker
- Gods of the Underdark
  - Gods of the Drow: Lolth, Kiaransalee, Vhaeraun, Zinzerena
  - Gods of the Underdark Dwarves: Laduguer, Diirinka, Diinkarazan
  - The Lost Gods: The Elder Elemental God, Juiblex, The Dark God
  - Gods of the Illithids: Ilsensine, Maanzecorian
  - Gods of the Myconids: Psilofyr
  - Gods of the Beholders: Great Mother, Gzemnid
  - Gods of the Svirfnebli: Callarduran Smoothhands
- The Giant Gods, Annam, Stronmaus, Hiatea, Grolantor, Iallanis, Karontor, Memnor, Skoraeus Stonebones, Diancastra; The Interloper Gods: Baphomet, Kostchtchie, Vaprak, Yeenoghu, Gorellik
- Gods of the Seas and Skies: Deep Sashelas, Demogorgon, Eadro, Jazirian, Koriel, Panzuriel, Persana, Quorlinn, Remnis, Sekolah, Surminare, Syranita, Trishina, Water Lion, Stillsong
- Gods of the Scaly Folk: Blibdoolpoolp, Laogzed, Merrshaulk, Parrafaire, Ramenos, Semuanya, Sess'innek, Shekinester; Io, Aasterinian, Bahamut, Chronepsis, Faluzure, Tiamat
- Gods of the Dark Folk: Cegilune, Kanchelsis, Mellifleur, Squerrik, Balador, Ferrix, Daragor, Eshebala
- The Sylvan Gods: Titania, Oberon, Caoimhin, Damh, Eachthighern, Emmantiensien, Fionnghuala, Nathair Sgiathach, Skerrit, Squelaiche and Verenestra, forming the Seelie Court, and their enemy, the Queen of Air and Darkness

== Dungeons & Dragons 3rd edition ==
There are over 100 deities in the Greyhawk setting, and when creating Dungeons & Dragons 3rd Edition Wizards of the Coast selected a subset to become iconic deities. They selected and altered deities to correspond to "iconic" aspects of core D&D. Most core deities are human deities; except for the chief gods of the demihuman races. Certain aspects of the deities were altered to make them more generic – for example: the "Core" Heironeous favors the longsword (in order to make the favored weapon of the "God of Chivalry" more traditionally knight-like), as contrasted with the original "Greyhawk" Heironeous, who favors the battleaxe.

The designation of "greater" vs. "intermediate" comes from Legends & Lore (1990). It is not used in any edition of the Player's Handbook, but it is used in Deities and Demigods (2002) and various v3.5 Edition materials.

=== Core D&D-pantheons ===
==== Greater deities ====
- Boccob, god of magic, arcane knowledge, balance, and foresight.
- Corellon Larethian, god of elves, magic, music, and the arts (also a demihuman power).
- Garl Glittergold, god of gnomes, humor, and gemcutting (also a demihuman power).
- Gruumsh, god of orcs (also a monster power).
- Moradin, god of dwarves (also a demihuman power)
- Nerull, god of death, darkness, murder, and the underworld.
- Pelor, god of sun, light, strength, and healing. More humans worship Pelor than any other deity.
- Yondalla, goddess of halflings (also a demihuman power).

==== Intermediate deities ====
- Ehlonna, goddess of forests, woodlands, flora & fauna, and fertility. Environmental studies scholar Matthew Chrulew contrasted the good-aligned Ehlonna with neutral Obad-Hai as corresponding "to two opposed modern conceptions of "nature"": Ehlonna's support for interventions against threats to the woodlands aligns with "the values of environmentalism", while Obad-Hai's more isolationst ideal of living "in harmony with the natural world" is "a perspective more in line with deep ecology".
- Erythnul, god of hate, envy, malice, panic, ugliness, and slaughter.
- Fharlanghn, god of horizons, distance, travel, and roads.
- Heironeous, god of chivalry, justice, honor, war, daring, and valor.
- Hextor, god of war, discord, massacres, conflict, fitness, and tyranny.
- Kord, god of athletics, sports, brawling, strength, and courage.
- Obad-Hai, god of nature, freedom, hunting, and beasts.
- Olidammara, god of music, revels, wine, rogues, humor, and tricks.
- Saint Cuthbert, god of common sense, wisdom, zeal, honesty, truth, and discipline.
- Wee Jas, goddess of magic, death, vanity, and law

==== Lesser deities ====
- Vecna, god of destructive and evil secrets.

=== Supplementary deities ===
While not listed in the Players Handbook, the following deities appear in supplementary rulebooks for the 3rd edition. Although some of these originally come from the Greyhawk, Forgotten Realms, or Eberron campaign settings, each one is mentioned at some point in a non-setting-specific source. The name in brackets next to each one specifies the source they are mentioned in.

- Aengrist, god of order in the Frostfell and knights of the Order of the Iron Glacier (Frostburn)
- Afflux, lesser god of inquiry, necromancy and death. (Libris Mortis)
- Al-Ishtus, god of scorpions and venom. (Sandstorm)
- Altua, goddess of honor and nobility. (Complete Warrior)
- Aurifar, god of the midday sun, life and judgement. (Sandstorm)
- Auril, goddess of cold, winter, and ice (Frostburn)
- Ayailla, goddess of light, celestial radiance, and good creatures of the sky. (Book of Exalted Deeds)
- Azul, bloodthirsty god of rain. (Sandstorm)
- Bahamut, lesser god of good (metallic) dragons, wisdom and the wind. (also the monster power of good dragons) (Deities & Demigods)
- Beltar, lesser goddess of malice, caves and pits. (Complete Divine)
- Bralm, lesser goddess of insects and industriousness. (Complete Divine)
- Cas, demigod of spite. (Heroes of Horror)
- Celestian, intermediate god of stars, space and wanderers. (Complete Divine)
- Chaav, god of enjoyment, delight, and pleasure. (Book of Exalted Deeds)
- Cyndor, lesser god of time, infinity and continuity. (Complete Divine)
- Dallah Thaun, the dark aspect of Yondalla. Intermediate Goddess of secrets, guile, lies, half-truths, flattery, intrigue, manipulation, and all things done by stealth. (Races of the Wild)
- Delleb, lesser god of reason, intellect and study. (Complete Divine)
- Doresain, demigod of necromancy. (also the monster power of ghouls) (Libris Mortis)
- Estanna, goddess of hearth and home. (Book of Exalted Deeds)
- Evening Glory, lesser goddess of love, beauty and immortality through undeath. (Libris Mortis)
- Geshtai, lesser goddess of lakes, rivers, wells and streams. (Complete Divine, Stormwrack)
- Haku, god of desert nomads, wanderers, freedom and desert wind. (Sandstorm)
- Halmyr, god of strategy and skill in warfare. (Complete Warrior)
- Hleid, goddess of animals of the Frostfell, cold magic, uldras (Frostburn)
- Iborighu, god of Frostfell dangers and eternal winter (Frostburn)
- Incabulos, greater god of plagues, sickness, famine, nightmares, drought and disasters. (Complete Divine)
- Istus, greater goddess of fate, destiny, divination, future and honesty. (Complete Divine)
- Iuz, demigod of deceit, pain, oppression and evil. (Complete Divine)
- Joramy, lesser goddess of fire, volcanoes, wrath, anger and quarrels. (Complete Divine, Sandstorm)
- Karaan, god of lycanthropy, cannibalism, wild savagery and urban decay. (Book of Vile Darkness)
- Kikanuti, protector and patron goddess of desert goblins. (Sandstorm)
- Konkresh, god of brute force. (Complete Warrior)
- Kurtulmak, intermediate god of trapmaking, mining and war. (also the monster power of kobolds) (Deities & Demigods)
- Kyuss, demigod of creation and mastery of undead. (Dragon Magazine #336)
- Lastai, goddess of pleasure, love, and passion. (Book of Exalted Deeds)
- Lirr, lesser goddess of prose, poetry, literature and art. (Complete Divine)
- Llerg, lesser god of beasts and strength. (Complete Divine)
- Lolth, intermediate goddess of the drow, spiders, evil and darkness. (also the monster power of Drow and a nondeity power) (Deities & Demigods)
- Lyris, goddess of victory and fate. (Complete Warrior)
- The Mockery, god of treachery over honor. (Stormwrack)
- Mouqol, lesser god of trade, negotiation, ventures, appraisal and reciprocity. (Complete Divine)
- Nadirech, god of cowardice, trickery and luck. (Complete Warrior)
- Osprem, lesser goddess of sea voyages, ships and sailors. (Complete Divine, Stormwrack)
- Phieran, god of suffering, endurance, and perseverance. (Book of Exalted Deeds)
- Pholtus, intermediate god of light, resolution, law and order. (Complete Divine)
- Procan, intermediate god of seas, sea life, salt, sea weather and navigation. (Complete Divine, Stormwrack)
- Pyremius, lesser god of fire, poison and murder. (Complete Divine)
- Rallaster, god of razors, mutilation, murder, insanity and torture. (Book of Vile Darkness)
- Rao, greater god of peace, reason and serenity. (Complete Divine)
- Selen, demigoddess of outcasts. (Races of Destiny)
- Set, god of evil and chaos. (Sandstorm)
- Solanil, goddess of oases and hospitality. (Sandstorm)
- Sulerain, goddess of death and slaughter. (Complete Warrior)
- Syreth, goddess of guardians and protection. (Complete Warrior)
- Telchur, lesser god of winter, cold and the north wind. (Complete Divine, Frostburn)
- Tem-Et-Nu, goddess of rivers, wealth, victory and life. (Sandstorm)
- Tharizdun, intermediate god of eternal darkness, decay, entropy, malign knowledge and insanity. (Complete Divine)
- Tiamat, lesser goddess of evil (chromatic) dragons, conquest, greed and cruelty. (also the monster power of evil dragons) (Deities & Demigods)
- Trithereon, intermediate god of individuality, liberty, retribution and self-defense. (Complete Divine)
- Typhos, god of tyranny. (Complete Warrior)
- Umberlee, goddess of anger, wrath, storms and tidal waves. (Stormwrack)
- Urbanus, lesser god of cities, growth and improvement. (Races of Destiny)
- Valarian, god of forest, forest creatures, and good-aligned magical creatures. (Book of Exalted Deeds)
- Valkar, god of courage. (Complete Warrior)
- Valkur, god of sailors, ships, favorable winds and naval combat. (Stormwrack)
- Vatun, god of northern barbarians, cold, winter and Arctic beasts. (Frostburn)
- The Xammux, composite god(s) of analytical thinking, forbidden lore, experimentation and amorality. (Book of Vile Darkness)
- Xan Yae, lesser goddess of twilight, shadows, stealth and mental powers. (Complete Divine)
- Yeathan, god of drowning, aquatic calamities, watery death and dark water. (Book of Vile Darkness, Stormwrack)
- Zagyg, demigod of humor, eccentricity, occult lore and unpredictability. (Dragon Magazine #338)
- Zarus, greater god of humanity, domination and perfection. (Races of Destiny)
- Zoser, god of wind, tornadoes and dervishes. (Sandstorm)
- Zuoken, demigod of physical and mental mastery. (Complete Divine, Expanded Psionics Handbook)

=== Other pantheons ===
The third edition version of Deities & Demigods contains only four pantheons: a condensed Greyhawk pantheon meant for insertion into any game world ("Core D&D Pantheon"), the Greek mythos and heroes ("Olympian Pantheon"), the Egyptian mythos ("Pharaonic Pantheon"), and the Norse mythos ("Asgardian Pantheon"). The third edition version of the book also discusses in detail how one would go about the creation of their own pantheon, as well as individual gods, for use in Dungeons & Dragons.

Three systems of alternative faiths were described in the third edition Deities and Demigods book:

- The Faith of the Sun is a fictional, monotheistic religion presented in and constructed according to the guidelines given for monotheistic religions in 3rd Edition Deities and Demigods. Its singular deity is Taiia, greater goddess of creation, destruction, mortal life and death.
- Following the Light is a fictional dualistic religion presented in and constructed according to the guidelines given for dualistic religions in 3rd Edition Deities and Demigods. It consists of two, polar-opposite deities: Elishar (intermediate deity of positive energy, light and prophecy) and Toldoth (intermediate deity of negative energy, darkness and destruction).
- The faith of Dennari is a fictional mystery cult, presented in and constructed according to the guidelines given for mystery cults in 3rd Edition Deities & Demigods. Its singular deity is Dennari, lesser goddess of earth, liberation and suffering.

=== Nondeity powers ===
Similar to monster powers, these are not true deities but very powerful extraplanar beings. These however do not even profess to be gods (though many still have designs on godhood).

==== Fiendish entities ====
===== Demon lords of the Abyss =====
The single unifying feature of all demon lords (also called demon princes) is the inherent control over part of the infinite layers of The Abyss. Only the first 666 layers of The Abyss are generally known, and of those only a small fraction of the princes of those layers are a part of the D&D cosmology.

- Baphomet, Prince of Beasts, demon prince of beasts and vengeance (also the monster power of minotaurs)
- Dagon, demon prince and patron of the deep sea.
- Demogorgon, self-proclaimed "Prince of Demons".
- Eltab, demon prince of hatred and retribution.
- Fraz-Urb'luu, demon prince and patron of illusionists and tricksters.
- Graz'zt, demon prince and patron of rulers by force.
- Juiblex, demon prince and patron of oozes and slimes.
- Kostchtchie, demon prince of the 23rd layer of The Abyss, the Ice Wastes; patron of evil frost giants.
- Lolth, demon princess of spiders, evil, darkness, chaos and assassins. (also a core power and the monster power of Drow)
- Malcanthet, demon queen of the succubi and patron of the hedonistic and lustful.
- Obox-ob, demon prince and patron of vermin.
- Orcus, demon prince of the 113th layer of The Abyss, Thanatos and patron of the undead.
- Pale Night, demon princess and theorized mother of the demon lords.
- Pazuzu, demon prince of the 503rd layer of the Abyss.
- Sess'innek, demon prince of civilization and dominion. (also the monster power of dark nagas and lizard kings)
- Vaprak, demon prince of combat and greed. (also the monster power of ogres and trolls)
- Yeenoghu, demon prince and patron of gnolls.
- Zuggtmoy, demon princess and "Lady of the Fungi"; long associated with the world of Greyhawk, chroniclers of the art of Dungeons & Dragons Michael Witwer et al. counted her among the characters who gained iconic status through the history of the game.
- Numerous others.

===== Arch-devils of Baator =====
- Bel, an arch-devil, ruler of Avernus, the 1st layer of the Nine Hells.
- Dispater, an arch-devil, ruler of Dis, the 2nd layer of the Nine Hells.
- Mammon, an arch-devil, ruler of Minauros, the 3rd layer of the Nine Hells.
- Belial, an arch-devil, and Fierna, his daughter, co-rulers of Phlegethos, the 4th layer of the Nine Hells.
- Levistus, an arch-devil, ruler of Stygia, the 5th layer of the Nine Hells.
- Glasya, an arch-devil, ruler of Malboge, the 6th layer of the Nine Hells.
- Baalzebul, an arch-devil, ruler of Maladomini, the 7th layer of the Nine Hells.
- Mephistopheles, an arch-devil, ruler of Cania, the 8th layer of the Nine Hells.
- Asmodeus, an arch-devil, ruler of Nessus, the 9th layer of the Nine Hells and overlord of all the other Arch-devils.

==== Celestial paragons ====
The celestial paragons are powerful unique outsiders of the Upper Planes. They are to the celestials as the archdevils are to the devils and the demon lords are to demons.

===== Archon paragons =====
The celestial paragons of the archons are known collectively as the Celestial Hebdomad. They rule the layers of the Plane of Mount Celestia.

Barachiel
ruler of the Silver Heaven of Lunia, the bottom layer of Celestia.
Domiel
ruler of the Golden Heaven of Mercuria, the second layer of Celestia.
Erathaol
ruler of Venya, the Pearly Heaven, the third layer of Celestia.
Pistis Sophia
ruler of Solania, the Crystal Heaven, the fourth layer of Celestia.
Raziel
ruler of Mertion, the Platinum Heaven, the fifth layer of Celestia.
Sealtiel
ruler of Jovar, the Glittering Heaven, the sixth layer of Celestia.
Zaphkiel
ruler of the Illuminated Heaven of Chronias, the seventh layer of Celestia.

===== Eladrin paragons =====
The celestial paragons of the eladrins are collectively known as The Court of Stars. They hail from the Plane of Arborea.

Faerinaal
oversees the defense of the Court of Stars and liberates eladrins captured by evil forces.
Gwynharwyf
Queen Morwel's loyal champion and a barbarian of unparalleled ferocity.
Morwel
the ruler of the eladrins and the Court of Stars.

===== Guardinal paragons =====
The celestial paragons of the guardinals are collectively known as Talisid and the Five Companions. They hail from the plane of Elysium.

Bharrai
the matriarch of the Ursinals, resides on Eronia, the second layer of Elysium.
Kharash
the paragon of Lupinals.
Manath
the duke of the Cervidals.
Sathia
the voice of the Avorals, and matron and muse for painters and sculptors.
Talisid
the most powerful of Leonals. Spends most of his time on Amoria, the topmost layer of Elysium.
Vhara
the duchess of the Equinals, resides on Amoria.

==== Archomentals ====
Archomentals are powerful exemplary beings of the Elemental Planes and the rulers of the elementals. Although they are not truly rulers of their planes, archomentals like to consider themselves as much and often grant themselves regal titles like Prince or Princess. They are compared in the source material to the archfiends or celestial paragons, and are considered to be the elemental equivalent of such beings.

===== Evil archomentals =====
The evil archomentals are collectively known as the Princes of Elemental Evil. At their introduction in Fiend Folio (1981) reviewer Ed Greenwood considered them "worthy additions to any campaign". The five most famous are:

- Cryonax, prince of evil cold creatures.
- Imix, prince of evil fire creatures.
- Ogrémoch, prince of evil earth creatures.
- Olhydra, princess of evil water creatures.
- Yan-C-Bin, prince of evil air creatures.

===== Good archomentals =====
The good archomentals are collectively known as the Elemental Princes of Good. The four most famous are:

- Ben-hadar, prince of good water creatures.
- Chan, princess of good air creatures.
- Entemoch and Sunnis, prince and princess of good earth creatures.
- Zaaman Rul, prince of good fire creatures.

===== Lesser evil archomentals =====
Three other archomentals are first mentioned in Manual of the Planes (TSR, 1987).

- Bwimb, prince of ooze creatures.
- Chlimbia, prince of magma creatures. In The Inner Planes (TSR, 1998) he is described as evil tyrant.
- Ehkahk, prince of smoke creatures.

==== Slaad Lords ====
The Slaad Lords are the de facto rulers of the Slaadi race and the plane of Limbo. Although true to their chaotic nature they often do not appear anything like other Slaadi.

- Chourst, lord of randomness.
- Rennbuu, lord of colors.
- Ssendam, lord of madness.
- Wartle, domain unknown.
- Ygorl, lord of entropy.

==== Primus ====
Primus is the leader of the modrons and is the epitome of order, and possesses god-like powers in the game. Artist Tony DiTerlizzi became fascinated by Primus and the other modrons when he got the challenge to redesign them from their first edition appearance for the Planescape campaign setting. Reviewer Scott Haring found the process successful as the "once-silly Modrons" were "given a new background and purpose that makes a lot more sense".

==== Titans ====
"Titans are closer to the well spring of life and thus experience more pronounced emotion including Deity-like fits of rage. In ages past some rebelled against the deities themselves..."

==== The Lady of Pain ====
The Lady of Pain is an enigmatic being who oversees the city of Sigil in the plane of the Outlands. Almost nothing is known about her; her origin, her race, her motives and her level of power are all obscure, although she is sometimes shown to have absolutely immense power. The Lady of Pain refuses to tolerate anyone who worships her, killing those who do so. Again; virtually nothing is known about her, apart from the fact that she has the power to slay gods who displease her.

==== Vestiges ====
These entities are outside the boundary of life, death, and undeath. They are untouchable by even the most powerful deities although they can be summoned and used by the weakest mortal through pact magic and binding. Binders are often feared and hunted down by "Witch Slayers." The list of vestiges that can be bonded with include:

- Acererak: The Eternal.
- Agares: Truth Betrayed.
- Amon: The Void Before The Altar.
- Andras: The Grey Knight.
- Andromalius: The Repentant Rogue.
- Aym: Queen Avarice.
- Balam: The Bitter Angel.
- Buer: Grandmother Huntress.
- Chupoclops: Harbinger of Forever.
- Dahlver-Nar: The Tortured One.
- Dantalion: The Star Emperor.
- Eligor: Dragon's Slayer.
- Eurynome: Mother of the Material.
- Focalor: Prince of Tears.
- Geryon: The Deposed Lord.
- Haagenti: Mother of Minotaurs.
- Halphax: Angel in the Angle.
- Haures: The Dreaming Duke.
- Ipos: Prince of Fools.
- Karsus: Hubris in the Blood.
- Leraje: The Green Herald.
- Malphas: The Turnfeather.
- Marchosias: King of Killers.
- Naberius: The Grinning Hound.
- Orthos: Sovereign of the Howling Dark.
- Otiax: The Key to the Gate.
- Paimon: The Dancer.
- Ronove: The Iron Maiden.
- Savnok: The Instigator.
- Shax: Sea Sister.
- Tenebrous: The Shadow That Was.
- Zagan: Duke of Disappointment.

Vestiges were introduced in D&D: Tome of Magic supplement by Matthew Sernett, Ari Marmell, David Noonan, Robert J. Schwalb. Wizards of the Coast, March 2006.

The supplement Dragon Magic, by Rodney Thompson and Owen Stephens published in September 2006, introduces this vestige:

- Ashardalon: Pyre of the Unborn

== Dungeons & Dragons 4th edition ==
These are the deities for the non-Greyhawk default campaign setting of 4th edition Dungeons & Dragons (informally referred to as the "points of light" setting).

=== Good and Lawful Good deities ===
- Avandra – Good Goddess of Change, Luck and Travel, Patron of Halflings. She is revered by rogues, travelers, and merchants, and is the enemy of Zehir, Asmodeus, and Torog.
- Bahamut – Lawful Good God of Justice, Protection and Nobility. Patron of Dragonborn.
- Moradin – Lawful Good God of Family, Community and Creation (as in smithing). Patron of Dwarves
- Pelor – Good God of Sun, Agriculture and Time. Seasonal God of Summer.

=== Unaligned deities ===
- Corellon – Unaligned God of Beauty, Art, Magic and the Fey. Seasonal God of the Spring and Patron of Eladrin.
- Erathis – Unaligned Goddess of Civilization, Inventions and Law.
- Ioun – Unaligned Goddess of Knowledge, Skill and Prophecy. Ioun is an ally of Corellon, Erathis and Pelor. She is the antithesis of Vecna, as she urges her followers to share all knowledge that he would keep hidden. Ioun is the second most popular deity among metallic dragons, second only to Bahamut. Her name is derived from the Ioun stones.
- Kord – Unaligned God of Storms, Battle and Strength.
- Melora – Unaligned Goddess of Wilderness, Nature and the Sea
- Raven Queen – Unaligned Goddess of Death, Fate and Doom. Seasonal Goddess of Winter.
- Sehanine – Unaligned Goddess of Illusion, Love and the Moon. Seasonal God of Autumn and Patron of Elves.

=== Evil and Chaotic Evil deities ===
- Asmodeus – Evil God of Tyranny and Domination. Lord of Devils
- Bane – Evil God of War and Conquest. Revered by Goblins
- Gruumsh – Chaotic Evil God of Slaughter and Destruction. Patron of Orcs
- Lolth – Chaotic Evil Goddess of Shadow and Lies. Patron of Drow and their inseparable companions, the spiders.
- Tharizdun – The Chained God, also known as the Elder Elemental Eye, creator of the Abyss.
- Tiamat – Evil Goddess of Greed and Envy. Patron of the Chromatic Dragons.
- Torog – Evil God of the Underdark. Patron of Jailors and Torturers
- Vecna – Evil God of the Undead and Necromancy. Lord of Secrets
- Zehir – Evil God of Darkness and Poison. Favoured Deity of the Yuan-Ti and Patron of Assassins.

=== Deceased and former deities ===
- Amoth – God of Justice and Mercy. Killed by the demon princes Orcus, Demogorgon, and Rimmon.
- Aoskar – God of Portals. Killed by the Lady of Pain.
- Gorellik – God of Hunting, Beasts, and Gnolls. Killed by the demon lord Yeenoghu.
- He Who Was – A god of good and possibly peace, he was killed by his archangel and exarch, Asmodeus. Implied to be the creator of humans, the devils wiped out all knowledge of his name, which they fear is powerful enough to revive him if it is ever spoken aloud again. The Nine Hells were originally his astral domain, now a prison for Asmodeus and his devils. A holy chalice belonging to him is mentioned in Divine Power.
- Khala – Goddess of Winter, wife of Zehir, Khala sought to trap the natural world in an eternal winter to secure power over it. Her plans convinced the primal spirits to expel gods and primordials from the world. She was killed by the other gods in a conflict called the War of Winter, who afterwards made a compact to balance darkness and light (Zehir and Pelor), and the natural seasons (Corellon, Pelor and Sehanine). Her power over winter was taken by the Raven Queen.
- Lakal – God of Healing and Mercy who was also her own Astral Dominion. She was an impersonal deity who communicated with her chosen people, the Quom, through "ecstatic moments of personal communion." She extolled mercy and urged her followers to dedicate themselves to pursuits that benefited the whole cosmos. Lakal's death was accidental – when Bahamut battled Nihil, the Primordial of nothingness, the pair crashed into Lakal. Bahamut was able to use the distraction to slay Nihil, but the primordial's death throes also caused Lakal to explode. The surviving quom now roam the planes, retrieving any shards of Lakal that they can find, including those unknowingly consumed by living creatures. Such creatures, including humanoids and player characters, are considered collateral damage in the quom's quest to restore Lakal. Ironically, even if the quom succeed in their quest, the restored Lakal would be disgusted with their methods.
- Maglubiyet – God of Goblinoids. Defeated by Bane.
- Nerull – God of Death and the Dead. Killed by The Raven Queen.
- Tuern – God of War. Killed by Bane.
- Nusemnee – Nusemnee was the daughter of Zehir. When she failed to assassinate a high priest of Pelor, she was abandoned and then mortally wounded by a paladin's holy blade. Expecting only death, she was surprised when the high priest healed her, showing her compassion and forgiveness. Intrigued, she decided to honor a promise to the high priest and aid him in his holy quest until a time that she could save his life in turn. Nusemnee thus became a symbol of redemption. When she finally died at the end of the high priest's quest, she rose again, this time as a minor goddess. In this form, she opposed her father by offering redemption to all who would turn away from evil. She was later killed by a poison that could kill anything—even a deity—that was distilled from Zehir's blood.

== Dungeons & Dragons 5th edition ==
These are the deities for the 5th Edition of Dungeons & Dragons, which mostly are printed in the Appendix section of the 5th Edition Players Handbook (2014). Details on deities are also included in the Dungeon Master's Guide (2014), the Sword Coast Adventurer's Guide (2015), and Mordenkainen's Tome of Foes (2018).

=== Deities of the Forgotten Realms ===
- Ao - The "supreme deity" of the Forgotten Realms with power over the other gods, used to the effect of setting creator Ed "Greenwood's initial inspiration of humanizing his divinities".
- Auril - Neutral evil goddess of winter. Auril's symbol is a six-pointed snowflake.
- Azuth - Lawful neutral god of wizards. Azuth's symbol is a left hand pointing upward, outlined in fire.
- Bane - Lawful evil god of tyranny. Bane's symbol is a black right hand with the thumb and fingers together.
- Beshaba – Chaotic evil goddess of misfortune. Beshaba's symbol is a pair of black antlers.
- Bhaal – Neutral evil god of murder. Bhaal's symbol is a skull surrounded by a ring of blood droplets.
- Chauntea – Neutral good goddess of agriculture. Chauntea's symbol is a sheaf of grain, or a blooming rose over grain.
- Cyric – Chaotic evil god of lies. Cyric's symbol is a jawless white skull on a purple or black sunburst.
- Deneir – Neutral good god of writing. Deneir's symbol is a lit candle above an open eye.
- Eldath - Neutral good goddess of peace. Eldath's symbol is a waterfall plunging into a still pool.
- Garagos - Chaotic neutral lesser deity of war.
- Gond – True neutral god of craft. Gond's symbol is a cog with four spokes.
- Helm – Lawful neutral god of protection. Helm's symbol is a staring eye on an upright left gauntlet.
- Ilmater – Lawful good god of endurance. Ilmater's symbol is two hands bound at the wrist by a red cord.
- Kelemvor – Lawful neutral god of the dead. Kelemvor's symbol is an upright skeletal arm holding balanced scales.
- Lathander – Neutral good god of birth and renewal. Lathander's symbol is a road travelling into a sunrise.
- Leira – Chaotic neutral goddess of illusion. Liera's symbol is a triangle, pointing down, containing a swirl of mist.
- Lliira – Chaotic good goddess of joy. Lliira's symbol is a triangle of three six-pointed stars.
- Loviatar – Lawful evil goddess of pain. Loviatar's symbol is a nine-tailed barbed scourge.
- Malar – Chaotic evil god of the hunt. Malar's symbol is a clawed paw.
- Mask – Chaotic neutral god of thieves. Mask's symbol is a black mask.
- Mielikki – Neutral good goddess of forests. Mielikki's symbol is a unicorn's head.
- Myrkul – Neutral evil god of death. Myrkul's symbol is a white human skull.
- Mystra – Neutral good goddess of magic. Mystra's symbol is a circle of seven stars, a circle of nine stars encircling a flowing red mist, or a single star.
- Oghma – True neutral god of knowledge. Oghma's symbol is a blank scroll.
- Savras – Lawful neutral god of divination and fate. Savras' symbol is a crystal ball containing many kinds of eyes.
- Selûne – Chaotic good goddess of the moon. Selûne's symbol is a pair of eyes surrounded by seven stars.
- Shar – Neutral evil goddess of darkness and loss. Shar's symbol is a black disk encircled with a border.
- Silvanus – True neutral god of wild nature. Silvanus' symbol is an oak leaf.
- Sune – Chaotic good goddess of love and beauty. Sune's symbol is the face of a beautiful red-haired woman.
- Talona – Chaotic evil goddess of disease and poison. Talona's symbol is three teardrops on a triangle.
- Talos – Chaotic evil god of storms. Talos' symbol is three lightning bolts radiating from a central point.
- Tempus – True neutral god of war. Tempus' symbol is an upright flaming sword.
- Torm – Lawful good god of courage and self-sacrifice. Torm's symbol is a white right gauntlet.
- Tymora – Chaotic good goddess of good fortune and adventure. Tymora's symbol is a face-up coin.
- Tyr – Lawful good god, representing justice and heroism. Tyr's symbol is a pair of balanced scales resting on a warhammer. He is based on the Norse deity Týr.
- Umberlee - Chaotic evil goddess of the sea. Umberlee's symbol is an ocean wave curling left and right.
- Waukeen – True neutral goddess of trade. Waukeen's symbol is an upright coin with Waukeen's profile facing left.

=== Deities of Greyhawk ===
- Beory – True neutral goddess of nature. Beory's symbol is a green disk.
- Boccob - True neutral god of magic. Boccob's symbol is an eye within a pentagram.
- Celestian - True neutral god of stars and wanderers. Celestian's symbol is an arc of seven stars inside a circle.
- Ehlonna – Neutral good goddess of woodlands. Ehlonna's symbol is a unicorn horn.
- Erythnul – Chaotic evil god of envy and slaughter. Erythnul's symbol is a single blood drop.
- Fharlanghn – Neutral good god of horizons and exploration. Fharlanghn's symbol is a circle crossed by a curved horizon line.
- Heironeous – Lawful good god of chivalry and war. Heironeous's symbol is a lightning bolt.
- Hextor – Lawful evil god of war and discord. Hextor's symbol is six arrows facing downwards in a fan.
- Kord – Chaotic good god of athletics and sport. Kord's symbol is four spears and four maces, radiating from a central point.
- Incabulos – Neutral evil god of plague and famine. Incabulos' symbol is a reptilian eye with a horizontal diamond.
- Istus – True neutral goddess of fate and destiny. Istus' symbol is a weaver's spindle with three strands.
- Iuz – Chaotic evil god of pain and oppression. Iuz's symbol is a grinning human skull.
- Nerull – Neutral evil god of death. Nerull's symbol is a skull with either a sickle or a scythe.
- Obad-Hai – True neutral god of nature. Obad-Hai's symbol is an oak leaf and acorn.
- Olidammara – Chaotic neutral god of revelry. Olidammara's symbol is a laughing mask.
- Pelor – Neutral good god of the sun and healing. Pelor's symbol is a sun.
- Pholtus – Lawful good god of light and law. Pholtus' symbol is a silver sun, or a full moon partially eclipsed by a smaller crescent moon.
- Ralishaz – Chaotic neutral god of ill luck and insanity. Ralishaz's symbol is three bone-fate-casting sticks.
- Rao – Lawful good god of peace and reason. Rao's symbol is a white heart.
- Saint Cuthbert – Lawful neutral god of common sense and zeal. Saint Cuthbert's symbol is a circle at the centre of starburst lines.
- Tharizdun – Chaotic evil god of eternal darkness. Tharizdun's symbol is a dark spiral, or inverted ziggurat.
- Trithereon – Chaotic good god of liberty and retribution. Trithereon's symbol is a triskelion.
- Ulaa – Lawful good goddess of hills and mountains. Ulaa's symbol is a mountain with a circle at its heart.
- Vecna – Neutral evil god of evil secrets. Vecna's symbol is a hand with an eye in its palm.
- Wee Jas – Lawful Neutral goddess of magic and death. Wee Jas' symbol is a red skull over a fireball.

=== Deities of Dragonlance ===
==== Good aligned gods ====
- Paladine – Lawful good god of rulers and guardians. Paladine's symbol is a silver triangle.
- Branchala – Neutral good god of music. Branchala's symbol is a bard's harp.
- Habbakuk – Neutral good god of animal life and the sea. Habbakuk's symbol is a bluebird.
- Kiri-Jolith – Lawful good god of honour and war. Kiri-Jolith's symbol is a pair of bison's horns.
- Majere – Lawful good god of meditation and order. Majere's symbol is a copper spider.
- Mishakal – Lawful good goddess of healing. Mishakal's symbol is a blue infinity sign.
- Solinari – Lawful good goddess of good magic. Solinari's symbol is a white circle, or sphere.

==== Neutral aligned gods ====
- Gilean – True neutral god of knowledge. Gilean's symbol is an open book.
- Chislev – True neutral goddess of nature. Chislev's symbol is a feather.
- Reorx – True neutral god of craft. Reorx's symbol is a forging hammer.
- Shinare – True neutral goddess of wealth and trade. Shinare's symbol is a griffon's wing.
- Sirrion – True neutral god of fire and change. Sirrion's symbol is multi-coloured fire.
- Zivilyn – True neutral god of wisdom. Zivilyn's symbol is a great green or gold tree.
- Lunitari – True neutral goddess of neutral magic. Lunitari's symbol is a red circle, or sphere.

==== Evil aligned gods ====
- Takhisis – Lawful evil goddess of night and hatred. Takhisis' symbol is a black crescent.
- Chemosh – Lawful evil god of the undead. Chemosh's symbol is a yellow skull.
- Hiddukel – Chaotic evil god of lies and greed. Hiddukel's symbol is a pair of broken merchant's scales.
- Morgion – Neutral evil god of disease and secrecy. Morgion's symbol is a hood with two red eyes.
- Sargonnas – Lawful evil god of vengeance and fire. Sargonnas' symbol is a stylized red condor.
- Zeboim – Chaotic evil goddess of the sea and storms. Zeboim's symbol is a turtle shell.
- Nuitari – Lawful evil god of evil magic. Nuitari's symbol is a black circle, or sphere.

=== Deities of Eberron ===
==== The Sovereign Host ====
- Arawai – Neutral good goddess of fertility. Arawai's symbol is a sheaf of wheat tied with a green ribbon.
- Aureon - Lawful neutral god of law and knowledge. Aureon's symbol is an open tome.
- Balinor - True neutral god of beasts and the hunt. Balinor's symbol is a pair of antlers.
- Boldrei – Lawful good goddess of communication and home. Boldrei's symbol is a fire in a stone hearth.
- Dol Arrah – Lawful good goddess of sunlight and honour. Dol Arrah's symbol is a rising sun.
- Dol Dorn – Chaotic good god of strength at arms. Dol Dorn's symbol is a longsword crossed over a shield.
- Kol Korran – True neutral god of trade and wealth. Kol Korran's symbol is a nine-sided gold coin.
- Olladra – Neutral good goddess of good fortune. Olladra's symbol is a domino.
- Onatar – Neutral good god of craft. Onatar's symbol is a crossed hammer and tongs.

==== The Dark Six ====
- The Devourer – Neutral evil god of nature's wrath. The Devourer's symbol is a bundle of five sharpened bones.
- The Fury – Neutral evil goddess of wrath and madness. The Fury's symbol is a winged wyrm with a woman's head and upper body.
- The Keeper – Neutral evil god of greed and death. The Keeper's symbol is a dragonshard shaped like a fang.
- The Mockery – Neutral evil god of violence and treachery. The Mockery's symbol is five blood-splattered tools.
- The Shadow – Chaotic evil god of dark magic. The Shadow's symbol is an obsidian tower.
- The Traveler – Chaotic neutral deity of chaos and change. The Traveler's symbol is four crossed, rune-inscribed bones.

==== Other Faiths of Eberron ====
- The Silver Flame – Lawful good deity of protection and good. The symbol of The Silver Flame is a flame drawn on silver or molded from silver.
- The Blood of Vol – Lawful neutral philosophy of immortality and undeath. The symbol of The Blood of Vol is a stylized dragon skull on a red teardrop gem.
- Cults of the Dragon Below – Neutral evil deities of madness. The symbol of The Cults of the Dragon Below is a stylized dragon skull.
- The Path of Light – Lawful neutral philosophy of light and self-improvement. The symbol of The Path of Light is a brilliant crystal.
- The Undying Court – Neutral good elven ancestors. The symbol of The Undying Court is a stylized skull.
- The Spirits of the Past – Chaotic good elven ancestors. The symbol of The Spirits of the Past varies.

=== Nonhuman deities ===
- Bahamut – Lawful good dragon god of good. Bahamut's symbol is a Dragon's head in profile.
- Blibdoolpoolp – Neutral evil kuo-toa goddess. Blibdoolpoolp's symbol is a lobster head in profile.
- Corellon Larethian – Chaotic good elf deity of art and magic. Corellon Larethian's symbol is a quarter moon, or sunburst.
- Deep Sashelas – Chaotic good elf god of the sea. Deep Sashelas' symbol is a dolphin.
- Eilistraee - Chaotic good drow goddess of song and dance. Eilistraee's symbol is a bastard sword standing vertically, point up, outlined against a full moon and surrounded by a nimbus of silver filaments.
- Eadro – True neutral merfolk deity of the sea. Eadro's symbol is a spiral design.
- Garl Glittergold – Lawful good gnome god of trickery and wiles. Garl Glittergold's symbol is a gold nugget.
- Grolantor – Chaotic evil hill giant god of war. Grolantor's symbol is a wooden club.
- Gruumsh – Chaotic evil orc god of storms and war. Gruumsh's symbol is an unblinking eye.
- Hruggek – Chaotic evil bugbear god of violence. Hruggek's symbol is a morning star.
- Kurtulmak – Lawful evil kobold god of war and mining. Kurtulmak's symbol is a gnome skull.
- Laogzed – Chaotic evil troglodyte god of hunger. Laogzed's symbol is an image of the lizard/toad god.
- Lolth – Chaotic evil drow goddess of spiders. Lolth's symbol is a spider.
- Maglubiyet – Lawful evil goblinoid god of war. Maglubiyet's symbol is a bloody axe.
- Moradin – Lawful good dwarf god of creation. Moradin's symbol is a hammer and an anvil.
- Rillifane Rallathil – Chaotic good wood elf god of nature. Rillifane Rallathil's symbol is an oak tree.
- Sehanine Moonbow – Chaotic good elf goddess of the moon. Sehanine Moonbow's symbol is a crescent moon.
- Sekolah – Lawful evil sahuagin god of the hunt. Sekolah's symbol is a shark.
- Semuanya – True neutral lizardfolk deity of survival. Semuanya's symbol is an egg.
- Skerrit – True neutral centaur and satyr god of nature. Skerrit's symbol is an oak growing from an acorn.
- Skoraeus Stonebones – True neutral god of stone giants and art. Skoraeus Stonebones' symbol is a stalactite.
- Surtr – Lawful evil god of fire giants and craft. Surtr's symbol is a flaming sword.
- Thrym – Chaotic evil god of frost giants and strength. Thrym's symbol is a white double-bladed axe.
- Tiamat – Lawful evil dragon goddess of evil. Tiamat's symbol is a dragon head with five claw marks.
- Yondalla – Lawful good halfling goddess of fertility and protection. Yondalla's symbol is a shield.

=== Dawn War Deities ===
- Asmodeus – Lawful evil god of tyranny.
- Avandra - Chaotic good goddess of change and luck.
- Bahamut - Lawful good god of justice and nobility.
- Bane – Lawful evil god of war and conquest.
- Corellon – Chaotic good god of magic and the arts.
- Erathis – Lawful neutral goddess of civilization and invention.
- Gruumsh – Chaotic evil god of destruction.
- Ioun – Neutral goddess of knowledge.
- Kord – Chaotic neutral god of strength and storms.
- Lolth – Chaotic evil goddess of spiders and lies.
- Melora – Neutral goddess of wilderness and the sea.
- Moradin – Lawful good god of creation.
- Pelor – Neutral good god of the sun and agriculture.
- Raven Queen – Lawful good goddess of death residing on the "sinister plane called the Shadowfell" and ruling over "twisted elves" called shadar-kai, which Black Gate reviewer Howard Andrew Jones praised as "creepy business".
- Sehanine – Chaotic good goddess of the moon.
- Tharizdun – Chaotic evil god of madness.
- Tiamat – Lawful evil goddess of wealth, greed, and vengeance.
- Torog – Neutral evil god of the Underdark.
- Vecna – Neutral evil god of evil secrets.
- Zehir – Chaotic evil god of darkness and poison.

==== Exandria ====
The sourcebook Explorer's Guide to Wildemount (2020), which is the official adaptation of the Exandria setting from the web series Critical Role for 5th Edition, uses a variation of the Dawn War pantheon. This setting divides the pantheon into the Prime Deities and the Betrayer Gods; it also adds Raei, the Everlight, to the Prime Deity side of the pantheon – this god is adapted from the Pathfinder god Sarenrae. Additionally, this setting introduces other potential divine sources outside of the pantheon, such as the Luxon.

The Luxon, which is associated with both light and dunamancy, does not "have an active consciousness or personality" and worship "is largely a system of pure faith, backed by scientific and metaphysical truths" derived from magical artifacts known as the Luxon Beacons; these artifacts are considered part of the Luxon's body and facilitate a reincarnation cycle. Academics Lisa Horton and David Beard, in the book The Routledge Handbook of Remix Studies and Digital Humanities, highlighted the departure in standard Dungeons & Dragon drow lore with the Kryn Dynasty, noting that their religion is centered on "the physical manifestation of light itself, the Luxon, and the pursuit of immortality". James Grebey, for Syfy Wire, commented that the Luxon religion "allows for souls to be reborn in another body" resulting in a society which is "race-neutral in a way that's rarely seen in fantasy lore. It's borderline progressive, even".

== See also ==
- List of Greyhawk deities
