= Corellon Larethian =

Fictional character in Dungeons & Dragons

- Dungeons & Dragons character
- Corellon Larethian
- First appearance: Deities & Demigods (1980)
- Created by: James Ward and Robert Kuntz

In-universe information
- Race: Deity
- Gender: Androgynous, but can choose to be male or female, or "both or neither"
- Title(s): Creator of the Elves, the Protector, First of the Seldarine, Protector and Preserver of Life, Ruler of All Elves, Coronal of Arvandor
- Alignment: Chaotic Good
- Home: Olympian Glades of Arborea (2e-3.5e)/Arvandor, the Verdant Isles (4e)
- Power level: Greater
- Portfolio: The Elven Race, Magic, Music, Arts, Crafts, Warfare, Poetry
- Domains: Chaos, Good, Protection, War

In the Dungeons & Dragons role-playing game, Corellon Larethian is the leader of the elven pantheon, and the deity of Magic, Music, Arts, Crafts, Poetry, and Warfare. Corellon is also considered a member of the default D&D pantheon. Corellon is the creator and preserver of the elven race, and governs those things held in the highest esteem among elves. Corellon's symbol was originally a crescent moon; in the 4th edition Corellon's symbol is a silver star on a blue field.

The 5th edition Player's Handbook describes Corellon as "androgynous" and Deities & Demigods (1980) explains that Corellon is "alternatively male or female, both or neither." The 2018 rule book Mordenkainen's Tome of Foes introduced the "blessed of Corellon" characteristic which allows player character elves to change their sex any time they take a "long rest" (a mechanic which is at least eight hours of in-game rest). This ability for players and 5th edition's affirmation that "you don't need to be confined to binary notions and gender," make Corellon an important fictional character for LGBTQ inclusivity.

== Publication history ==
=== Advanced Dungeons & Dragons 1st edition (1977–88) ===
Corellon Larethian was created by James M. Ward for the Deities and Demigods Cyclopedia (1980).

=== Advanced Dungeons & Dragons 2nd edition (1989–1999) ===
Corellon Larethian was detailed in the book Monster Mythology (1992), including details about the god's priesthood. Corellon's role in the cosmology of the Planescape campaign setting was described in On Hallowed Ground (1996). Corellon received a very detailed description for his role in the Forgotten Realms in Demihuman Deities (1998). Corellon is described as one of the good deities that celestials can serve in the supplement Warriors of Heaven (1999).

=== Dungeons & Dragons 3.0 edition (2000–2002) ===
Corellon Larethian appears as one of the deities described in the Players Handbook for this edition (2000). Corellon Larethian is detailed in Deities and Demigods (2002), and the god's role in the Forgotten Realms is revisited in Faiths and Pantheons (2002).

=== Dungeons & Dragons 3.5 edition (2003–2007) ===
Corellon Larethian appears in the revised Players Handbook for this edition (2003). The god's priesthood is detailed for this edition in Complete Divine (2004).

=== Dungeons & Dragons 4th edition (2008–2014) ===
Corellon appears as one of the deities described in the Players Handbook for this edition (2008). Corellon's alignment is listed in this edition as Unaligned. In 4th edition Corellon's symbol is a star. Corellon is also the seasonal god of spring and the patron god of the eladrin.

Corellon also appears in the Forgotten Realms Campaign Guide and Forgotten Realms Player's Guide as one of the Greater Deities of the Realms. This version of Corellon is Good (as opposed to Unaligned), and is more similar to earlier portrayals of the god. Corellon's consort is Angharradh, as the Faerunian version of Sehanine is revealed to be an aspect of Selûne.

=== Dungeons & Dragons 5th edition (2014–present) ===
Corellon is included as a deity in the 5th Edition Player's Handbook (2014) where they are described as "androgynous". The sourcebook Mordenkainen's Tome of Foes (2018) has a chapter on elves which includes their origin story as creations of Corellon. This sourcebook also introduces the "blessed of Corellon" mechanic. Christian Hoffer of ComicBook.com highlighted that a major theme of this sourcebook is "that elves were once a mutable race. Their creator Corellon Larethian was an androgynous being and elves could originally change their forms at will". While no longer fully mutable, some elves are blessed by Corellon which means they can "choose their biological sex whenever they finish a long rest. These elves can choose to be male, female, or 'neither' based on their moods or feelings".

== Fictional description ==
=== Relationships ===
In many campaign settings, the elven pantheon of gods (also known as the Seldarine) consists of the leader Corellon Larethian, as well as Aerdrie Faenya, Deep Sashelas, Erevan Ilesere, Fenmarel Mestarine, Hanali Celanil, Labelas Enoreth, Rillifane Rallathil, Sehanine Moonbow, and Solonor Thelandira. Other elven gods may be present in different campaign settings. Corellon is considered to be foremost among the Seldarine. Corellon's consort is Sehanine Moonbow. Some myths claim that Corellon gave birth to the rest of the elven pantheon while in a female aspect, while others claim that Corellon fathered them with Sehanine Moonbow. Corellon raised Ye'Cind to the status of demigod by infusing him with a spark of Corellon's own power.

Gruumsh One-Eye, god of the orcs, is the god's greatest enemy, because Corellon took his eye in an ancient battle. The entire orc pantheon hates Corellon intensely. Corellon also opposes the deities of the goblinoids. Corellon was also the one to banish the drow goddess Lolth (Araushnee in the Forgotten Realms setting) to the Abyss. For this, Corellon can count all evil drow gods as enemies. Because of the god's keen friendship with the Seelie Court, Corellon is often at odds with the Queen of Air and Darkness. In the Forgotten Realms, Corellon has most often been at odds with Cyric, Talos, Malar, and Moander.

Corellon's truest friends are the rulers of the other demihuman pantheons: Moradin, Yondalla, and Garl Glittergold. Together, they work to ensure that the gods of the human and monstrous pantheons don't grow strong too quickly. Corellon is also allied with Cyrrollalee, Ehlonna, Emmantiensien, Oberon, Pelor, Skerrit, and Titania. Corellon is also on good terms with Vanathor, Bahamut's gold dragon advisor and bard.

In 4th edition, Corellon is one of the "Four Free Gods", along with a spouse Sehanine, Avandra and Melora. Corellon is on good terms with Ioun (Corellon is patron of arcane magic and she of its study), and is therefore a potential foe of Vecna. Corellon maintains cordial relationships with the other seasonal gods, Pelor and the Raven Queen. Corellon's most hated enemies, of course, are Gruumsh and Lolth.

=== Realm ===
Corellon lives in the realm of Arvandor on the plane of Arborea. Also called Arvanaith in its role as the elven afterlife, Arvandor is said to have been taken from the gods of the giants after a lengthy war. Ruins of giant citadels still dot the land there. The elven gods are thought to have invaded from the plane of Ysgard, hungry for a realm of their own. The realm is a place of deep forests and fey beauty.

Corellon dwells in a magnificent tower of marble in the center of the realm. In Elven, it is called Gwyllachaightaeryll, the Many-Splendored. The art that decorates the tower's many rooms is constantly changing. Only the central throne room is a constant.

=== Dogma ===
Corellon desires to protect and preserve the elven race, return to the elven people their lost artistic heritage, and to thwart the schemes of the drow and the orcs. This also means guarding against the corruption within that resulted in the creation of the drow. Corellon advises his faithful to guard against stagnation as well, continually seeking out new experiences. They seek to bring out beauty through art, craft, and magic. Corellon is surprisingly humble, for a regent of his stature.

With the 2004 publication of The Complete Divine, Corellon added the domain of "Community" to his existing domains of Good, War, Protection and Chaos.

=== Worshippers ===
Elves, and half-elves (as well as many bards) worship Corellon. Corellon favors those who kill orcs and the followers of Lolth. Corellon blesses those who aid others and is upset at those who defile the dead, or flee from their foes.

==== Clergy ====
Corellon's clerics wear silver circlets and gossamer robes of the brightest azure. They often wear blue cloaks. Corellon's favored weapon is the longsword.

==== Fellowship of the Forgotten Flower ====
The Fellowship of the Forgotten Flower is a loosely structured organization made of elven knights dedicated to the recovery of lost elven relics from long-abandoned elven realms. Members must be elven warriors or elven paladins.

==== Seekers of the Misty Isle ====
The Seekers of the Misty Isle are an elite order of elves dedicated to finding the Misty Isle which was whisked away by the deities Gruumsh and Kurtulmak.

=== Temples ===
In large elven cities such as Enstad, temples to Corellon Larethian may be alabaster wonders with soaring spires. In smaller communities, they may be built among the branches of a large tree such as an ipp. Most temples are happy to lend aid to traveling elves and any other race that plans to do harm to the drow.

=== Holy Days ===
Most of Corellon's holy days are tied to celestial events and occur only once every few years or decades.

Once per month, when Luna is at its quarter phase, followers of Corellon gather in moonlit glades for a ceremony known as Lateu'quor, the Forest Communion of the Crescent Moon. There, they praise their Creator through song and dance and offerings of beautiful art. The art is not destroyed; sometimes it is physically transferred to the Upper Planes for elves to enjoy in the afterlife, while other times it is used to decorate Corellon's temples. Sometimes the very landscape of the glade is reshaped into a work of art.

Once per year, on the fourth of Richfest, the holiday of Agelong is celebrated. Elves hunt for orcs to slay in memory of Corellon's battle against the god of the orcs, Gruumsh.

=== Rituals ===
Corellon Larethian is worshipped at natural geological formations. Corellon's rituals are integrated with the major events of elven life, such as births, coming of age rites, weddings, and funerals.

Prayers to Corellon, which are always in Elvish, begin "Hei-Corellon shar-shelevu," which means, "Corellon, by your grace grant..." Before battle, worshippers of Corellon recite a prayer called the Litany of Arrows.

== Campaign settings ==
=== Greyhawk ===
Corellon appears in first edition AD&D Deities and Demigods. As such, the god is considered a "default" deity for the realm of Oerth.

=== Forgotten Realms ===
Following the War of the Spider Queen series, Lisa Smedman's The Lady Penitent trilogy continues the story of drow in the Forgotten Realms. In book 1, Sacrifice of the Widow, Eilistraee slays Vhaeraun and acquires Corellon's portfolio and thus many of the god's priests. Cavatina Xarann, a Darksong Knight, recovers the Crescent Blade and uses it to slay Selvetarm, Lolth's champion. In book 2, Storm of the Dead, Vhaeraun's clergy have been warily accepted into Eilistraee's faith, and the goddess now is known as the Masked Lady. A small faction of Vhaeraun's remaining clerics believe that, instead, Vhaeraun slew Eilistraee and is masquerading as her. A mixed force of Eilistraee's Protectors, Nightshadows and drow wizards go on a raid on the main temple of Kiaransalee, the drow death goddess. High magic is used to erase Kiaransalee's name from memory, causing the goddess' death from lack of worship. Qilué, uncharacteristically, orders the slaughter of the helpless former cultists of Kiaransalee. In book 3, Ascendancy of the Last, the Promenade is beset by the cultists and oozes of Ghaunadaur. The attackers have been baited by uncontented Nightshadows and the Balor, Wendonai, acting through the Crescent Blade and Qilué. In the ensuing battle the Promenade and the followers of Eilistraee are almost annihilated and Ghaunadaur's followers are rendered feeble-minded. Qilué and Eilistraee try to save the entire drow race from Wendonai's taint, but Qilué is killed by Halisstra Melarn while Eilistraee is possessing her body (supposedly killing the goddess as well), dooming their attempt to failure. Meanwhile, Q'arlynd Melarn succeeds in re-transforming the descendants of Miyeritar and followers of Eilistraee from drow to dark elves, whereafter Corellon Larethian takes this new elven subrace under his protection.

During the event known as The Sundering, Eilistraee manages to return to life alongside her brother Vhaeraun, and is one of the deities with whom Mystra is sharing the Weave. Eilistraee has directly manifested to her followers through her avatar, and the dark elves whom her father protected during her absence have returned under her protection.

=== Exandria ===
Exandria is the world where the Critical Role web series is set; it became an official Dungeons & Dragons campaign setting with the release of the Explorer's Guide to Wildemount (2020). Corellon appears as one of the Prime Deities and is also known as the Arch Heart. They are genderfluid and are considered the god of the elves, as well as the patron of the fey. Corellon fought in the Calamity, "a cataclysmic event in which the Exandrian pantheon exploded into a civil war that put the entire world in peril". The Prime Deities ended the war by locking the Betrayer Gods and then themselves behind a Divine Gate to prevent all gods from "directly interfering" in the events of Exandria; however, they can "bestow power" and send lesser creatures on their behalf.

Critical Role: Call of the Netherdeep (2022), an official adventure module, revealed that Corellon was one of three gods who blessed the mortal hero Alyxian during the Calamity. Alyxian then prevented Gruumsh from destroying the continent of Marquet, however, he ended up caught in a rift that became known as the Netherdeep. In the module, the gods Sehanine, Avandra, and Corellon beseech adventurers to save Alyxian centuries after the Calamity. The 2024 three-part Downfall special in Critical Role's third campaign focused on the fall of Aeor during the Calamity; it featured Corellon as a player character portrayed by Abubakar Salim.

== Reception ==
In 2014, James Vincent of The Independent identified Corellon as an example of D&D's embracing of LGBT characters, as the god is "often seen as androgynous or hermaphroditic," and some elves are made in the god's image. Dana Rudolp, a veteran player and LGBTQ parenting author contributing to The Huffington Post, explained Corellon's significance in terms of representation: "D&D has long attracted LGBTQ players, among others, as these examples of gay and transgender players (and my own experiences) show. Many of us have been bending our characters' genders and sexual orientations for years, but it's terrific to see the game officially embrace this. Kudos to the makers of D&D, Wizards of the Coast." Nathan Grayson, for Kotaku in 2016, noted the while some critics have attempted to claim that the inclusion of transgender characters in Dungeons & Dragons properties is "unprecedented" and "modern", these claims are untrue as "even as far back as 1st Edition, Corellon Larethian existed with those characteristics" that are noted in the god's 5th Edition description. Eleanor Tremeer, for Geek & Sundry in 2019, highlighted that Corellon's significance is that gender and sex fluidity is "built into the lore" of the game.

The academic book Queerness in Play (2018) highlighted that inclusive "queer representation has become mainstream in tabletop RPGs", noting that the 5th Edition of Dungeons & Dragons (2014) included "a nod toward queer characters and play" with the description of Corellon's cosmogony – "the passage, while brief and criticized both for being awkwardly worded and pandering, was relatively well received. It is a clear signal that after decades of silence, Dungeons & Dragons is now explicitly welcoming towards queer play." Academic Sarah Donnelly, in 2020 for the Lambda Literary Review, similarly thought the passage was "awkwardly phrased" while being "well-intentioned". Donnelly commented "but I can't help but be frustrated by the idea that I need permission to play a trans or gender non-conforming character—that there apparently has to be a deity involved for an elf to be non-binary". In 2023, academic PS Berge called the Queerness in Play description of the 2014 Dungeons & Dragons passage "perhaps an understatement" when they simply called it awkward as the original passage potentially misgenders one of their examples and with another example "implies that misgendering, gendered assumptions about facial hair, and dysphoria are all expected parts of the game world". Berge then highlighted the expanded description of Corellon in Mordenkainen's Tome of Foes (2018) where the god is "described as beautiful in their transformative power—yet this is also linked to their treachery" as an oath breaker and opined that the description of Corellon's conflict with Gruumsh has "transphobic subtext" since it is Corellon's transformative traits that "drive Gruumsh to violence". Berge also viewed the drow's opposition to the Blessed of Corellon as being centered on "racialized violence and transphobia" which is rooted in "the same bioessentialist logics of fantasy racism". Berge wrote:

Corellon and the blessed elves embody the problem of positioning trans stories and bodies within the fantasy realist logics of D&D. To bring trans power into D&D's systems is to accept a reductive quantization: setting awkward and disturbing limits on trans power in the name of balance while centering hostility, violence, and shame to make transness an obstacle for narrative growth.

== Additional reading ==
- McComb, Colin. The Complete Book of Elves. Lake Geneva, WI: TSR, 1992.
- Moore, Roger E. "The Elven Point of View." Dragon #60. Lake Geneva, WI: TSR, 1982.
- Races of the Wild
- Dragon magazine #283 – "Do-It-Yourself Deities"
- Living Greyhawk Journal no. 3 – "Gods of Oerth"
