= Book of Exalted Deeds =

Dungeons & Dragons supplement

- Author: James Wyatt, Darrin Drader and Christopher Perkins
- Genre: Role-playing game
- Publisher: Wizards of the Coast
- Publication date: October 2003
- Media type: Print (Hardback)
- Pages: 192
- ISBN: 0-7869-3136-1

The Book of Exalted Deeds is an optional sourcebook for the 3.0 edition of the Dungeons & Dragons role-playing game published by Wizards of the Coast (WotC) in 2003. It provides supplementary game material for campaigns involving characters of good alignment. Within the game, there is also a powerful magical artifact of the same name.

== Contents ==
The Book of Exalted Deeds was designed to be a counterpoint to the previously published Book of Vile Darkness, and offered new rules for good occurrences, acts, and characters in the game.

=== Chapter summary ===
1. The Nature of Good: This defines how good is seen in the Dungeons & Dragons setting, as well as how good-aligned characters of different alignments act in relation to the world around them.
2. Variant Rules: This simply adds additional rules for a campaign featuring good-aligned characters that allows such characters to become exalted characters.
3. Exalted Equipment: This talks about the weapons (sometimes special) used by exalted characters.
4. Feats: This chapter includes several new feats, the vast majority of which are exalted feats, meant specifically for good-aligned characters and usable only by such.
5. Prestige Classes: This chapter introduces prestige classes appropriate for an exalted campaign.
6. Magic: This chapter provides spells almost exclusively for good characters, as well as magical items, weapon and armor enhancements, and artifacts appropriate to such a campaign.
7. Celestial Paragons: This chapter discusses (and provides NPC stat blocks for) celestial paragons, rulers of the Upper planes so overwhelmingly powerful that they are revered as a god would be, even on the Material Plane. It also discusses the Upper Planes to an extent.
8. Monsters: This chapter contains good-aligned monsters, featuring the Deathless type, as well as templates to create customized monsters.

=== Mature content ===
Wizards of the Coast had published the controversial Book of Vile Darkness in 2002, a game supplement that explored evil themes and raised the ire of some with its "Mature Content" sticker, sexualized imagery and graphic details. The following year, WotC released the Book of Exalted Deeds, also with a "Mature Content" warning.

The Book of Exalted Deeds was the flip side of the Book of Vile Darkness and dealt with "the extreme elements of the good alignment". It included "ethical questions that most players might not be comfortable with including in their game" and "also dealt with aspects of real-world religion and tried to use them in the context of Dungeons & Dragons, such as stigmata".

== Authors ==
The book was written by James Wyatt, Darrin Drader and Christopher Perkins, with cover art by Henry Higginbotham, and interior art by Tom Baxa, Steve Belladin, Matt Cavotta, Brent Chumley, Rebecca Guay-Mitchell, Jeremy Jarvis, Doug Kovacs, Ginger Kubic, David Martin, Mark Nelson, Wayne Reynolds, Ron Spencer, Arnie Swekel, and Ben Thompson.

== The Book of Exalted Deeds artifact ==
Not to be confused with the WotC book, Gary Gygax described a powerful magical artifact of the same name in the original Dungeon Master's Guide in 1979. The original item raised the Wisdom ability score of good clerics who spent a week reading it, and also granted them a new level of experience. The artifact has subsequently appeared in every new edition of D&D, although with varying powers.

== Reception ==
- While reviewer Alex DeMorris thought that the book had some "great new material", he noted that the new "paragon" class of creatures lacked any obvious motive or purpose, saying, "Their descriptions come across more as creature statistics than a character portrait. Without goals, it may be hard for a DM to use them as anything other than stage dressing when the player characters start traveling the planes." DeMorris concluded that the book had "some rough spots that could have been better developed", and that it was "a good book, but not a great one."
- Reviewer Merric Blackman thought there was good material in the book, particularly about the nature of good, variant rules for good characters, new feats and prestige classes. He was less enthused about new equipment, new magic spells and new monsters. Blackman thought this was a stronger book than Book of Vile Darkness due to the inclusion of more usable material, but he warned that it "may not integrate well into your established D&D cosmology." He also noted the "tendency towards powerful abilities that may not be properly balanced by the role-playing restrictions. This is not a book for the novice Dungeon Master!" Nevertheless, he concluded that he did like the book, and found it "inspiring".
- The review site Game Monkeys Magazine liked the tangible theme of the book, and found the artwork "fair to good with no real stand out pieces." It also found the new feats, prestige classes and spells "solid additions to the game." It concluded by giving the book an average rating of 3.5 out of 5, saying "All in all, for those who like to play the extremely valiant character, the Book of Exalted Deeds is a solid addition to your primary sourcebook", but added "That is unfortunately only useful if you're playing the gaming equivalent of Mother Theresa."

== Reviews ==
- Dragão Brasil
- Backstab #49 (as "Les Chapitres Sacrés")
