= Monsters of Faerûn =

2001 role-playing game supplement

Monstrous Compendium: Monsters of Faerûn
- Genre: Role-playing game
- Publisher: Wizards of the Coast
- Publication date: 2001
- Media type: Print

Monstrous Compendium: Monsters of Faerûn is a supplement for the 3rd edition of Dungeons & Dragons.

== Contents ==
Monsters of Faerûn features 96 pages of monsters unique to the Forgotten Realms campaign setting. It was the first 3rd edition book to feature the now-common "in the Realms" section for each monster, offering helpful and concise hints to the Dungeon Master as to how and where to incorporate the creature into the campaign setting.

== Publication history ==
The book was released in 2001. The book was co-authored by James Wyatt and Rob Heinsoo. Cover art is by Brom and Henry Higginbotham, with interior art by Daren Bader, Ed Beard, Theodor Black, Carl Critchlow, Brian Despain, Scott Fischer, Michael Kaluta, Todd Lockwood, David Martin, Monte Moore, Allan Pollack, Adam Rex, Wayne Reynolds, Richard Sardinha, Brian Snoddy, and Sam Wood.

== Reception ==
The reviewer from Pyramid stated that "Dungeons and Dragons has long had a tradition of making a lot of Monster Compendiums, a showcase of new and exotic monsters to add to the creatures in the Monster Manual, for settings from the Forgotten Realms to Dark Sun. The first Monster Compendium made for the Third Edition of Dungeons and Dragons continues this old tradition, and does it well."

== Reviews ==
- Coleção Dragão Brasil
- Backstab #29
- Coleção Dragão Brasil
