= Frostburn (disambiguation) =

Frostburn is a supplemental book to the Dungeons and Dragons game.

Frostburn may also refer to:

- Frost burn, frostbite
- Frostburn (Regional Burn), a regional Burning Man event in West Virginia
- Frostburn Studios, a video game developer
