= Crow people (disambiguation) =

Crow people can refer to:

- Crow Tribe of Montana, a Native American tribe
- Karasu-tengu (烏天狗, crow tengu), a Japanese legendary creature resembling an anthropomorphic crow
- Kenku, an anthropomorphic crow race in the Dungeons & Dragons fantasy universe loosely based on the tengu
