= Ferrix =

Ferrix may refer to:

- Ferrix, a fictional deity first published in 2nd edition of the Advanced Dungeons & Dragons role-playing game.
- Ferrix, a fictional planet featured in Star Wars Andor television series.
