= Bahamut (Dungeons & Dragons) =

Fictional draconic deity in Dungeons & Dragons

- Dungeons & Dragons character
- First appearance: Greyhawk (1975)
- Created by: Gary Gygax and Rob Kuntz

In-universe information
- Aliases: Xymor (dragons of Abeir-Toril); Marduk the Justice Bringer (humans of the Old Empires region of Abeir-Toril)
- Race: Deity
- Gender: Male
- Title(s): The Platinum Dragon, King of the Good Dragons, Lord of the North Wind, Wyrmking
- Alignment: Lawful Good
- Home: Seven Mounting Heavens of Celestia
- Power level: Intermediate (3.5)/Greater (4e)/Greater (5e)
- Portfolio: Good dragons, wisdom, justice
- Domains: Air, Cold, Dragon, Good, Law, Luck, Nobility, Protection, Storm (3.5) / Hope, Justice, Protection (4e) / Life, War (5e)
- Superior: Io (father)

In the Dungeons & Dragons (D&D) role-playing game, Bahamut (/bəˈhɑːmət/ bə-HAH-mət) is a powerful draconic deity, who has the same name as Bahamut from Arabic mythology.

Introduced in the 1st Edition of Advanced Dungeons & Dragons (AD&D) and continuing into 2004's release of Complete Divine, Bahamut, the Platinum Dragon, is the King of the Good Dragons. He is a deity of good dragonkind (usually, but not exclusively, referring to metallic dragons) and a member of the default pantheon of D&D gods. His counterpart in Dragonlance is Paladine (though many regard the two as separate beings). Bahamut is a child of the dragon god Io. He is also referred to as the God of Dragons or the Lord of the North Wind.

In many campaign settings, the draconic pantheon of gods consists of the leader Io, and his children Aasterinian, Bahamut, Chronepsis, Faluzure, Sardior, and Tiamat. Other draconic gods may be present in different campaign settings. For example, the Forgotten Realms draconic pantheon also includes Astilabor, Garyx, Hlal, Lendys, and Tamara (among others); these five deities have expanded their influence to become venerated in many other campaign settings as well.

== Publishing history ==
Bahamut's personal name is derived from the Bahamut of Arabic mythology, an elegant giant fish that supports the world, with an angel that stands on top a ruby on his head to cleanse the unknown in the universe.

=== Dungeons & Dragons (1974–1976) ===
The character was introduced to the game in its first supplement, Greyhawk (1975), by Gary Gygax and Rob Kuntz. In this book, he was only known as the Dragon King, also called the Platinum Dragon, and did not have a personal name.

=== Advanced Dungeons & Dragons 1st edition (1977–1988) ===
The character appears in the first edition Monster Manual (1977). In this book, the Platinum Dragon was given the personal name Bahamut.

He was also identified as a lesser god for dragons in the book Deities & Demigods (1980).

Bahamut, the Platinum Dragon, King of the Good Dragons, and Angel of the Seven Heavens is further described in Dragon #38 (1980).

Bahamut's role in the outer planes is detailed in the first edition Manual of the Planes (1987).

=== Advanced Dungeons & Dragons 2nd edition (1989–1999) ===
Bahamut was first detailed as a deity for the Forgotten Realms campaign setting in the original Draconomicon (1990).

Bahamut was detailed as a deity in the book Monster Mythology (1992), including details about his priesthood.

Bahamut is also described in Cult of the Dragon (1998).

His role in the cosmology of the Planescape campaign setting was described in On Hallowed Ground (1996).

Several draconic children of Bahamut are described in the article "Spawn of Tiamat, Children of Bahamut", in Dragon #260 (June 1999).

Bahamut is described as one of the good deities that celestials can serve in the supplement Warriors of Heaven (1999).

=== Dungeons & Dragons 3.0 edition (2000–2002) ===
Bahamut appears in a preview article for the third edition, in Dragon #272 (June 2000). This information is later included in the Manual of the Planes (2001),

Bahamut is further detailed as a deity in Defenders of the Faith (2000) and Deities and Demigods (2002).

=== Dungeons & Dragons 3.5 edition (2003–2007) ===
Bahamut's priesthood and his role as a draconic deity are further detailed for this edition in Draconomicon: The Book of Dragons (2003), Complete Divine (2004), and Races of the Dragon (2006).

=== Dungeons & Dragons 4th edition (2008–2013) ===
Bahamut appears as one of the deities described in the Players Handbook for this edition (2008). He is further detailed and has a stat block in the Draconomicon: Metallic Dragons (2009).

Bahamut options for PCs and details of his clergy as an enemy threat are detailed in the articles "Channel Divinity: Bahamut" and "Deities & Demigods: Bahamut" in Dragon #378 (August 2009).

=== Dungeons & Dragons 5th edition (2014–2023) ===
The character is mentioned in the fifth edition Monster Manual (2014). In this book, the chief deity of metallic dragons is called the King of Good Dragons. He is identified as Bahamut, the Platinum Dragon. It is stated that he is a lesser god.

== Fictional description ==
Bahamut is depicted as a massive, long and sinuous dragon with silver-white scales and blue, catlike eyes. According to Complete Divine and Races of the Dragon, the exact color is hard to specify and may depend on Bahamut's mood, ranging from sky-blue to frosty indigo.

About a quarter of the time, Bahamut wanders Oerth in the shape of a human or some other guise. He is said to have been encountered as a frail old hermit, with the seven great golden wyrms that accompany him disguised as seven canaries singing sweetly nearby.

=== 4th edition changes ===
The Platinum Dragon is part of the core pantheon and chiefly sees worship from lawful good paladins and clerics. The dragonborn race reveres him as a creator god, while other races invoke him for strength and protection. It is also stated that kings are crowned in his name. Bahamut is also stated to take many forms, ranging from his draconic namesake, an old man, to a fully armed paladin warrior in shining platinum plate armor. He has a special feat called Armor of Bahamut which allows the player to cancel out an enemy's critical hit once per encounter. His dominion in the Astral Sea is Celestia, the Radiant Throne, which he shares with Moradin and Kord. In the Forgotten Realms campaign setting, a different version of Bahamut is present as a lesser deity in service to Torm, the ruler of that setting's Mount Celestia.

== Fictional relationships ==
Bahamut is a child of the dragon god Io, and a fierce enemy of Tiamat, his evil sister and twin. He respects Heironeous, Moradin, Yondalla, and other lawful good deities. Some myths claim he is the son of Lendys, god of justice, and Tamara, goddess of mercy, but more commonly those deities are said to be among his younger siblings, which also include Aasterinian, Chronepsis (also said to be his uncle), Astilabor, Hlal, Faluzure, Garyx, and Nathair Sgiathach.

=== Tiamat and Bahamut ===
The same edition of Dungeons & Dragons that introduced Bahamut also introduced his antithesis, named Tiamat, the Chromatic Dragon and Queen of Evil Dragons, as well as the mother and deity of all evil dragons. This pairing features prominently in the deity lore of the game, with Tiamat even being featured in the television cartoon adaptation of the game.

This pairing of Tiamat and Bahamut as the antithesis of each other has since recurred in other fantasy settings. In both the original Final Fantasy and Final Fantasy VIII, Bahamut is portrayed as benevolent, while Tiamat is portrayed as malevolent, keeping close to their origins in D&D.

Both also occur in the card game Three-Dragon Ante, and Aspects of them have been created as plastic miniatures.

=== Vassals ===
A number of non-divine dragons and dragonlike beings serve Bahamut:

- Medrinia is a blue-green aquatic dragon said to have been born from the first tear that Bahamut shed after witnessing the desolation left after the first battle between Tiamat and the dragons of good. She dwells in the undersea palace of Sea Reach on the Prime Material Plane, allying with dolphins, sea-horses, and other aquatic dragons to defeat evil and protect good.
- Xathanon is a burst of golden energy with draconic shape, said to be a physical embodiment of the Positive Energy Plane. It was created by Bahamut from positive energy long ago, and it serves Draco Paladin unswervingly. It has a special hatred for Dhrakoth the Corruptor, a negative energy being created by Tiamat.
- Vanathor, the Golden Harpist, is Bahamut's advisor and bard, appearing as a gold dragon with a swirl of rainbow colors on his breast. The master of all things musical, Vanathor dwells with the Platinum Dragon in his palace. He is on good terms with all the gods of music, especially Corellon Larethian. He sometimes appears as a handsome half-elven bard. Some myths say he was actually a dead god from an ancient pantheon, given new life by Bahamut's magic.
- Falx Templamut is a very old silver dragon who is Bahamut's grandson. He has two wives, Big Alice and Sillitellimut. He dwells across the Solnor Ocean from the Flanaess, guarding caves filled with evil forces and beings.
- St. Leomar, a former Paladin of Bahamut who is a golden-scaled halfdragon. He built a notable church of Bahamut in the Kingdom of Ahlissa (on Oerth) and was therefore raised to exarch state by Bahamut, to attend to the needs of his followers on Oerth.

==== 4th edition ====
The Seven Great Gold Wyrms are the closest of Bahamut's servants, guarding his palace and escort him disguised as canaries when he is traveling the world. They also are emissaries of Bahamut in tasks that don't demand Bahamut's personal attention. Although powerful, they are not immortal: many gold wyrms in the circle have died, and new gold dragons are chosen to replace them. These are the current seven great gold wyrms:

- Borkadd the Claw, a male gold dragon, is Bahamut's hand of justice. He is sent to enforce the law when there is no alternative.
- Kurya the Eye, a suspicious female gold dragon. She is the spy of Bahamut, sent on tasks that demand secrecy.
- Sonngrad the Wing, a female gold dragon who is the messenger of Bahamut.
- Gruemar the Voice, a male gold dragon, is a negotiator who prefers peaceful words over bloodshed.
- Marroshok the Tail, a massive male gold dragon, is the bodyguard of Bahamut. Though he is a merciless warrior, he is usually friendly and genial.
- Troannaxia the Presence, a female shining gold dragon, who with her intimidating presence is sent to subdue resistance when nothing else will suffice.
- Urgala the Fang, a female gold dragon who serves as a leader and chief tactician when Bahamut musters an army.

Kuyutha is the best known of the exarchs of Bahamut. He is the Bahamut emissary to the dragonborn race. Kuyutha was the last of the greatest dragonborn paladins of the long-lost empire of Arkhosia, and he saved many of the surviving dragonborn clans after the fall of the empire. For his deeds, Bahamut rewarded him with a divine spark. Kuyutha now lives in Mount Mertion (one of the seven mounts of Mount Celestia), training a new order of dragonborn knights of Bahamut.

Bahamut is closely allied with Moradin, and together with Kord they rule Celestia in a holy triumvirate. Tiamat remains his greatest enemy, and he opposes all evil and chaotic evil members of the pantheon. A race known as the Quom also hates Bahamut, due to his role in unintentionally killing their god, Lakal.

== Fictional lore ==
=== Myths and legends ===
==== Vorel ====
Tiamat's enmity with Bahamut dates back to their creation, when Io made them; they were made with the intention of becoming complements and mates, but their personalities were too much at odds. Tiamat murdered Vorel, her eldest brother, and tried to frame Bahamut for the deed. Io realized who was truly to blame, though, and banished Tiamat from his presence.

==== The Banishment of Tiamat ====
Many myths claim that Tiamat lived for a long time on the Prime Material Plane, seeding it with evil dragons and dark magic. Eventually she was banished to the Nine Hells by Bahamut and a sky/sun god (perhaps Pelor or Heironeous).

=== Realm ===
Bahamut's realm, Bahamut's Palace, is said to exist "beyond the East Wind." It is unknown to most sages whether this means it is somewhere on the Elemental Plane of Air or somewhere between that plane and the Seven Heavens or Tri-Paradises, but it actually may be found traveling in a whirlwind between the first four layers of Mount Celestia. It is a glittering fortress with windows made from gems set in silver and gold, walls of inlaid copper and ivory, and floors of beaten mithril. When they are not traveling with their master, Bahamut's seven great golden wyrms tend to the palace and its treasures.

Within the palace are open, unkeyed portals leading to all four of the first four layers of the plane as well as the Elemental Plane of Air and the Astral Plane. There are four gates nearby leading to each of the four winds, each guarded by a warden archon. The guardian of the gate to the North Wind is Yonel, the guardian of the gate to the South Wind is Kerkhoutha, the guardian of the gate to the West Wind is Moriel, and the guardian of the gate to the East Wind is Ruhiel.

Bahamut's palace is the only known shortcut to the upper layers of the celestial mountain, though he and his servants only permit those who are worthy to pass through.

In 4th Edition, Bahamut, Kord, and Moradin live in the realm of Celestia in the Astral Sea. Each rules a different mountain on the island, which they are able to change the shape of at will. Bahamut's palace is located on the mountain of Mertion, and is made of gold, platinum, and mithril, and the windows are made of gemstones; the palace also serves as Bahamut's hoard.

=== Dogma ===
Bahamut is very stern and disapproving of evil. He accepts no excuses for foul deeds. On the other hand, he is very compassionate, and has boundless empathy for the weak and downtrodden. He urges his followers to promote good, but to let people fight their own battles when they can, providing healing, information, or temporary safe refuge rather than fighting alongside those who can fight for themselves.

Bahamut's own greatest priority is his endless war with his sister Tiamat. He opposes all her schemes, answering them move for move. He values wisdom, knowledge, prophecies, and song. For a dragon, he is neither vain nor greedy.

==== Worshippers and clergy ====
Bahamut is revered by all good dragons, but gold, silver, and brass dragons hold him in particularly high regard and though the evil dragons do not revere him, they respect Bahamut for his power and wisdom.

Bahamut only accepts good-aligned priests. They may be dragons, half-dragons, or other beings. They strive to constantly yet subtly act on behalf of good. They oppose evil, but their first mandate is to ensure they do no harm in the process.

==== Temples ====
Temples to the Platinum Dragon are very rare. Those few that exist are elegant edifices characterized by simple architecture and furnishings. They contain public rooms in which the faithful can gather and private rooms for meditation and recuperation.

Dragons will not normally build temples, contenting themselves with simple symbols on walls that they treat as shrines. Bahamut prefers his followers to worship him with deeds, not objects.

==== Rituals ====
Most of the quests that Bahamut's followers go on are apt to involve opposing Tiamat in some way. They have few formal rituals. Instead of praying aloud, they count their deeds as prayers, supporting goodness and opposing evil. Bahamut cares little for mere words.

===== The Rite of Rebirth =====
Rarely, humans, elves, halflings, or other humanoid races may hear a call, like a faint question in their hearts, asking them if they want to devote themselves completely to Bahamut. Normally it is first heard before adolescence, but sometimes adults hear it as well. Not all those who are called answer, but those who do may undergo the Rite of Rebirth. Those who commit to this demanding ritual put aside all their weapons and equipment, dressing in a simple linen shift. They meditate for a full day and night, their head filled with reminders of all they are giving up. If they elect to go on, they then enter an egg-shaped chamber at dawn and sleep until dawn the next day, emerging as a dragonborn, a noble, draconic, platinum-scaled version of their previous shape, ready to become a permanent champion against Tiamat and her spawn.

== Reception ==
Bahamut appeared on the 2019 Screen Rant top list at #5 on "Dungeons and Dragons: 10 Most Powerful Dragons, Ranked", and Matthew Guida highlighted that "As an old man and a dragon, Bahamut is level 36 with over 1,600 and 1,300 hit points respectively. He is able to teleport, can use several breath attacks and can summon an aspect of himself to fight players. With such overwhelming power, Bahamut is nothing short of a force of nature."
