= Fiendish Codex I: Hordes of the Abyss =

2006 Dungeons & Dragons sourcebook

- Cover of the first edition
- Author: James Jacobs, Erik Mona, and Ed Stark
- Genre: Role-playing game
- Publisher: Wizards of the Coast
- Publication date: June 2006
- Media type: Print (Hardback)
- Pages: 160
- ISBN: 0-7869-3919-2

Fiendish Codex I: Hordes of the Abyss is an optional supplemental source book for the 3.5 edition of the Dungeons & Dragons roleplaying game.

== Contents ==
=== Chapter 1: Demonic Lore ===
Explains a number of well known aspects of demons, including their physiology, their interactions on the Material Plane, the roles they fit into, and how possession works. Also details the Black Scrolls of Ahm.

=== Chapter 2: Demons ===
Discusses the difference between the three main subtypes of demon: loumara, obyrith, and tanar'ri. Also includes information on 16 different types of demons: Armanite, Bar-Lgura, Broodswarm, Bulezau, Chasme, Dybbuk, Ekolid, Goristro, Guecubu, Lilitu, Mane, Molydeus, Nabassu, Rutterkin, Sibriex, and Yochlol.

=== Chapter 3: Demon Lords ===
Discusses the following 14 demon lords: Baphomet, Dagon, Demogorgon, Fraz-Urb'luu, Graz'zt, Juiblex, Kostchtchie, Malcanthet, Obox-ob, Orcus, Pale Night, Pazuzu, Yeenoghu, and Zuggtmoy. Their statistics are given at lower Challenge Ratings than in previous books such as Book of Vile Darkness, ranging from Juiblex at CR 19 to Demogorgon at CR 23. It also provides tips on advancing the demon lords so that they can be as powerful as you like.

=== Chapter 4: Trafficking with Demons ===
Discusses various ways of interacting with demons, from fighting them to allying with them. Includes game statistic information for feats and magic spells related to demons and demon hunting.

=== Chapter 5: Into the Abyss ===
Features a general overview of the Abyss, and includes descriptions for 15 layers of the Abyss (including the realms of the above-mentioned demon lords).

=== Appendices ===
There are three appendices: I features a list of all known demon lords; II features a list of all known layers of the Abyss; and III features a list of all known types of demon, sorted by their Challenge Ratings, which are updated to 3.5. Appendix III also includes the books from which they originated.

== Publication history ==
Fiendish Codex I was written by Ed Stark, James Jacobs, and Erik Mona, and was published in June 2006. Cover art is by Sam Wood, with interior art by Thomas M. Baxa, Carl Critchlow, Erik Gist, Ralph Horsley, William O'Connor, Ted Pendergraft, Wayne Reynolds, Anne Stokes, Arnie Swekel, and Franz Vohwinkel.

Erik Mona talked about his love for D&D's demons and how he came to work on this book: "I've always been fascinated by D&D's demons, from the very first time I paged through the original Monster Manual back in the 1980s. When TSR had a presence on AOL back in the early 90s, I got in touch with Planescape author Colin McComb and served as a research assistant on Faces of Evil, the 2nd edition fiend sourcebook, and the credit for that help is my first credit in a D&D book. [...] I don't remember where I first heard that Wizards was planning to do this book, but it only took about five minutes to write the email suggesting that James and I would like to write it. Wizards agreed, and teamed us up with in-house designer Ed Stark, and we were off to the races."

== Reviews ==
- Coleção Dragon Slayer
