= David Griffith (artist) =

English artist

- Known for: Fantasy art

David Griffith is an artist whose work has appeared in role-playing games.

== Career ==
His Dungeons & Dragons work includes interior art for Frostburn (2004), Stormwrack (2005), Magic of Incarnum (2005), Complete Psionic (2006), Fiendish Codex II: Tyrants of the Nine Hells (2006), Fantastic Locations: The Frostfell Rift (2006), Magic Item Compendium (2007), Complete Champion (2007), Fortress of the Yuan-Ti (2007), Wizards Presents: Races and Classes (2008), the 4th edition Player's Handbook (2008), Dungeon Master's Guide (2008), and Monster Manual (2008). His work also includes over a dozen covers for Goodman Games's line of Dungeons & Dragons adventures and source books.

Griffith was one of the artists on Dungeons & Dragons 4th Edition For Dummies.
