= Fantastic Locations: The Frostfell Rift =

Dungeons & Dragons adventure module

- Rules required: Dungeons & Dragons, 3.5 edition
- Character levels: 4th-18th
- Authors: Ari Marmell
- First published: December 2006

Fantastic Locations: The Frostfell Rift is an adventure module for the 3.5 edition of the Dungeons & Dragons fantasy role-playing game.

== Plot summary ==
Fantastic Locations: The Frostfell Rift presents several encounters involving the Frostfell. Locations include Hailstorm Tower, the Caves of Chaos, and the Frostfell Rift.

== Publication history ==
Fantastic Locations: The Frostfell Rift was written by Ari Marmell, and was published in December 2006. Cover art was by Izzy, with interior art by David Griffith.
