= Henry Higginbotham =

Artist

Henry Higginbotham is a working artist who specializes in neo-primitive art, steampunk, sculpture and more.

== Education ==
Higginbotham has a master's degree in fine arts from the University of Iowa.

== Works ==
Henry G. Higginbotham has produced interior and cover illustrations for role-playing game books since 1993. He began his career with White Wolf, on their numerous products for their games Wraith: The Oblivion and Changeling: The Dreaming. Higginbotham illustrated the covers of several Dungeons & Dragons books in the game's second edition, and then produced cover art for the third edition game's Player's Handbook, Monster Manual, and Dungeon Master's Guide (2000), Monsters of Faerûn (2001), Monster Manual II (2002), Book of Vile Darkness (2002), Fiend Folio, the 3.5 versions of the Player's Handbook, Monster Manual, and Dungeon Master's Guide (2003), Book of Exalted Deeds, Monster Manual III (2004), Complete Divine (2004), Magic of Incarnum (2005), Weapons of Legacy (2005) and Monster Manual V (2007).

Higginbotham also illustrated cards for the Magic: The Gathering collectible card game.
