= Kenku =

Fictional Dungeons & Dragons creatures

- First appearance: Fiend Folio (1981)

In-universe information
- Type: humanoid
- Alignment: Varies by edition, generally neutral

Kenku (/kɛŋˈkuː/ keng-KOO or /ˈkɛŋkuː/ KENK-oo) are a fictional race of bird-like humanoid creatures in the Dungeons & Dragons fantasy roleplaying game. They have appeared in multiple editions in the game's history and became an official playable race in Volo's Guide to Monsters. They are loosely based on tengu, spiritual beings in Japanese mythology, and are most recognizable for their lack of a voice; instead of speaking themselves, they use their gift of mimicry to communicate. Jeremy Crawford, lead rules designer of the Dungeons & Dragons game, says "[they] can cleverly piece together voices and sounds they've heard to communicate".

== Publication history ==
The kenku originally appeared as uncommon monsters in the first edition of the Fiend Folio (1981) for Advanced Dungeons & Dragons. In this sourcebook, they wielded quarterstaffs or katanas, had inherent magical abilities, and could change their appearance once a month. They had slight magic resistance and were typically treated as thieves and tricksters, with a neutral or chaotic alignment.

The kenku next appeared in the second edition's Monstrous Compendium Volume Two (1989), and were reprinted in the Monstrous Manual (1993). This sourcebook described them as bipedal humanoid birds that used their powers to "annoy and inconvenience" humans, with average intelligence, a neutral alignment, and a secretive, thieving nature. They were also incapable of speech and communicated with birdlike squawks, and were described as being skilled at gestures and pantomime to convey their thoughts. As in their previous incarnations, they possessed a degree of magic resistance and were renowned for their crafty, malicious cunning; they were occasionally known to pass themselves off as gods to steal the offerings of worshippers.

The kenku and the kenku sneak appeared in 3.5 edition's Monster Manual III (2004). The kenku was further developed in Dragon #329 (March 2005). An adventure involving kenku appeared in Dungeon #120.

The kenku's next appearance was in the game's fourth edition in Monster Manual 2 (2009). It subsequently received an article in Dragon #411, "Winning Races: Kenku", which fleshed them out as a playable race.

The kenku most recently appears in the fifth edition in the Monster Manual, the Dungeon Master's Guide (2014), and as a playable race in Volo's Guide to Monsters. In these sourcebooks, kenku are rendered incapable of making sounds or developing ideas of their own, cursing them to steal everything from words to goods from others. They are presented as wingless, avian humanoids who were cursed by an ancient god, yearn for their lost flight and roam the world as bandits and thieves.

== Ecology ==
=== Physical characteristics ===
Kenku are commonly depicted in Dungeons & Dragons lore as short, dextrous hawk-, raven- or crow-like humanoids. In earlier editions, they possessed wings capable of flight, which were described as folding against their backs and "[could] be mistaken at a distance for a large backpack". In later editions, however, kenku lost their wings, a trait that plays into their racial backstory. They are described as having humanoid arms, with clawed talons in place of feet and hands; these talons are capable of grasping and performing fine motor tasks. They are typically covered in russet-brown, dark blue or black feathers and have black beaks and "brilliant yellow" eyes, but have a relatively humanoid build. Though more agile than humans, they tend to be physically weaker and are more suited as rogues and thieves than fighters. They have yellow eyes in earlier editions, or small black beady eyes in subsequent editions. They are light for their size due to their hollow bones. They are typically between five and seven feet in height and weigh roughly 75 pounds (32 kilograms). They often wear light, loose-fitting clothing and carry daggers or other small weapons, which they frequently conceal within their cloaks.

=== Unique traits ===
The kenku's backstory and traits are expanded upon in Volo's Guide to Monsters, in which it is explained: "Haunted by an ancient crime that robbed them of their wings, the kenku wander the world as vagabonds and burglars who live at the edge of human society." According to this version of kenku lore, the kenku once served a powerful, unnamed god, but were cursed by their former master for coveting his riches. As punishment, their wings, creativity and voices were taken away, making them a cursed race. Kenku can now only speak through precise mimicry of voices and sounds in the environment; they can never produce sounds of their own nor extrapolate other sounds to speak independently. They were also stripped of their creativity, and thus can never create original works and ideas; they are described as condemned to a life of "hopeless plagiarism". Many kenku are described as longing for the ability to fly, and perform executions by throwing their condemned from towers to mock the lost skill, often while weighed down by wooden "wings".

=== Alignment ===
In the first and second editions of Dungeons & Dragons, kenku are typically neutrally aligned. In the third edition, they are usually neutral evil. In the fourth edition, they are unaligned. In the fifth edition, they tend towards chaotic neutral.

== Society ==
Kenku typically work in gangs, clans or groups called "flocks" in large cities, where they gather riches through theft and robbery and thrive in the underworld of urban life. They are not particularly strong, and therefore tend to use cunning rather than force. They are described as being excellent minions, scouts and spies for stronger creatures, and often appear in Dungeons & Dragons adventures as such.

Most kenku in earlier editions worship the demon prince Pazuzu, though Quorlinn is worshipped by those not so disposed toward evil. In these editions, Kenku clerics usually venerated Vecna.

- Quorlinn is the kenku deity of trickery, disguise, and thievery. His symbol is a mask with a large false nose. Quorlinn was first detailed in the book Monster Mythology (1992), including details about his priesthood. Quorlinn appears as a typical kenku wearing a black mask and fairly nondescript clothing. Quorlinn is depicted as a likable, roguish trickster. He has a tinge of malice about him at times, but he has also aided races other than his own. He spends much of his time whining about the responsibilities imposed upon him by a race he did not choose to have created in his image.

== Campaign settings ==
=== Greyhawk ===
Kenku appeared in "The Forsaken Arch," an adventure in the Greyhawk setting featured in Dungeon #120. In this adventure, kenku bandits ambushed and plundered shipments of precious pearls, and were the minions of Artimus Fisk, a covetous cultist of Pazuzu.

A group of kenku fought to possess a silver statue in "Tamara Belongs to Me," one of the adventure cards in From the Ashes (1992).

In the Flanaess, kenku have been encountered from the Duchy of Berghof in the Hold of the Sea Princes, to the Gnarley Forest, to the Cairn Hills.

=== Forgotten Realms ===
Kenku appear in the Forgotten Realms setting as a race of flightless avian humanoids, described as selfish and secretive in nature. They are commonly found in human cities in southern Faerun, working as assassins, thieves, scouts and spies.

== Historical inspiration ==
Kenku were inspired by tengu, a mythological creature from Japanese folklore that takes the form of an avian humanoid. In particular, the symbolic mask of their deity, Quorlinn, was directly inspired by the red, large-nosed masks often worn by tengu in Japanese mythology.

== Reception ==
In a 2021 review, Comic Book Resources counted the kenku among the seven least-often used monster races in Dungeons and Dragons despite its great potential. One year before, the kenku had been rated the seventh-most powerful race in Dungeons and Dragons by the same website.

Colin McLaughlin called them one of his "favorite creatures in D&D", and found that their backstory "gives the kenku a type of humanity and sadness you rarely get to see from a splash monster page." Similarly A.V. Club reviewer Nick Wanserski found the backstory "really compelling" and that their description "as a tribe living under a curse that cost them their wings, their voice, and their creativity paints an evocative picture that would be fun to explore as a character".

Reviewer Zack Furniss found the backstory of this player character race "especially interesting" and concluded: "In effect, they’ve become living tape recorders that can only communicate with soundbites collected throughout life. How cool is that? I want to play as one right now." Cameron Kunzelmann from Paste magazine recommended to "definitely play the kenku. It's a cool crow-person who hollers and squawks and generally just owns bones all over the Forgotten Realms."
