= Moradin =

Dwarven deity in Dungeons & Dragons

- Dungeons & Dragons character
- First appearance: Deities and Demigods (1980)
- Created by: James Ward and Robert Kuntz

In-universe information
- Race: Deity
- Gender: Male
- Title: Soul Forger, Dwarffather, the All-Father, the Creator
- Alignment: Lawful Good
- Home: Dwarfhome (Forgotten Realms)/Celestia, the Radiant Throne (4th edition)
- Power level: Greater
- Portfolio: Dwarves, creation, smithing, protection, metalcraft, stonework
- Domains: Creation, Earth, Good, Law, Protection, and Knowledge

Moradin is the chief deity in the dwarven pantheon in the Dungeons & Dragons game and is a member of the default D&D pantheon. In 3rd edition, Moradin's domains are Creation, Earth, Good, Law, and Protection. The 5th Edition Players Handbook include Knowledge as a suggested domain. His titles include Soul Forger, Dwarffather, the All-Father, and the Creator. He created the first dwarves out of earthen materials and tutored them in dwarven ways.

== Publication history ==
=== Advanced Dungeons & Dragons 1st edition (1977–1988) ===
Moradin was created by James M. Ward for the Deities and Demigods Cyclopedia (1980).

=== Advanced Dungeons & Dragons 2nd edition (1989–1999) ===
Moradin was first detailed as part of the dwarven pantheon in the Forgotten Realms in Dwarves Deep (1990).

Moradin was detailed in the book Monster Mythology (1992), including details about his priesthood.

His role in the cosmology of the Planescape campaign setting was described in On Hallowed Ground (1996).

Moradin received a very detailed description for his role in the Forgotten Realms in Demihuman Deities (1998).

Moradin is described as one of the good deities that celestials can serve in the supplement Warriors of Heaven (1999).

=== Dungeons & Dragons 3.0 edition (2000–2002) ===
Moradin appears as one of the deities described in the Players Handbook for this edition (2000).

Moradin is detailed in Deities and Demigods (2002), and his role in the Forgotten Realms is revisited in Faiths and Pantheons (2002).

=== Dungeons & Dragons 3.5 edition (2003–2007) ===
Moradin appears in the revised Players Handbook for this edition (2003). His priesthood is detailed for this edition in Complete Divine (2004).

=== Dungeons & Dragons 4th edition (2008–2014) ===
Moradin appears as one of the deities described in the Players Handbook for this edition (2008). A setting-specific version of him appears in the Forgotten Realms Campaign Guide and the Forgotten Realms Player's Guide (both 2008) for this edition.

=== Dungeons & Dragons 5th edition (2014–) ===
Moradin appears in the list of Nonhuman Deities found in the Players Handbook for this edition (2014).

== Relationships ==
Moradin is the head of the dwarven pantheon. He is married to Berronar Truesilver, and counts Gruumsh and Maglubiyet among his most fierce foes. He is friendly with Pelor.

In many campaign settings, the dwarven pantheon of gods consists of the leader Moradin, as well as Abbathor, Berronar Truesilver, Clanggedin Silverbeard, Dugmaren Brightmantle, Dumathoin, Muamman Duathal, and Vergadain. Other dwarven gods may be present in different campaign settings.

In 4th edition, Moradin counts Asmodeus as one of his chief enemies, and is closely allied with Bahamut.

== Realm ==
Moradin's realm is Erackinor, on the plane of Mount Celestia, which he shares with his wife Berronar.

== Worshippers ==
Moradin charges his followers with the task of removing the kingdoms of orcs and wiping out the followers of Gruumsh. He is upset if they flee from their foes or kill their fellow dwarves.

=== Clergy ===
Moradin's clerics wear earthy colors, with chain mail and silvered helms. His clerics are usually drawn from family lines, like most dwarven occupations.

=== Hammers of Moradin ===
The Hammers of Moradin are an elite military order dominated by crusaders and fighting clerics with chapters in nearly every dwarven stronghold and members drawn from every dwarven clan. The Hammers serve both as commanders of dwarven armies and as an elite strike force skilled in dealing with anything from large groups of orcs to great wyrms to malevolent fiends from the Lower Planes.

The order is dedicated to the defense of existing dwarven holdings and the carving out of new dwarven territories. Individual chapters have a great deal of local autonomy but, in times of great crisis, a Grand Council (the reigning monarchs and senior Hammers of the affected region) assemble to plot strategy and divine Moradin's will.

== Temples and rituals ==
Moradin is worshipped at forges and hearths. Melted metals are sacrificed to him monthly.

== Holy days ==
Moradin's holy days fall during the crescent moon.
