= Sam Wood (artist) =

Artist

- Born: Sam
- Occupation: Artist

Sam Wood is an artist whose work has appeared in role-playing games.

== Works ==
Sam Wood did his first work for Wizards of the Coast in 1995, and later became a staff illustrator. Wood's earliest work in the game industry was for the BattleTech TCG, and he went on to work on games like Dungeons & Dragons, Magic: The Gathering, Alternity, Doomtown, Legend of the Five Rings, and Chainmail. He collaborated with Todd Lockwood on D&D and concept work on many of the Chainmail miniatures.

Wood has continued to produce interior illustrations and cartography for many Dungeons & Dragons books and Dragon magazine since 1997, as well as cover art for Deities and Demigods (2002), Underdark (2003), Frostburn (2004), and Fiendish Codex I: Hordes of the Abyss (2006). He has also produced artwork for many other games including Star*Drive (TSR), Deadlands (Pinnacle Entertainment Group), and Wheel of Time (Wizards of the Coast), and illustrated cards for the Magic: The Gathering collectible card game.
