= Frostburn =

Tabletop role-playing game supplement

- cover of Frostburn
- Author: Wolfgang Baur, James Jacobs, and George Strayton
- Genre: Role-playing game
- Publisher: Wizards of the Coast
- Publication date: September 2004
- Media type: Print (Hardback)
- Pages: 224
- ISBN: 0-7869-2896-4

Frostburn is a supplemental book to the 3.5 edition of the Dungeons & Dragons fantasy role-playing game.

== Contents ==
Frostburn provides rules for adventuring in a cold environment as well as an environment known as frostfell, which is a sort of arctic environment with extreme (sometimes even magical) cold.

The book contains information about cold and how it affect characters in the game, as well as various monsters, races, weapons, and spells that can be found in a Frostfell environment.

== Publication history ==
Frostburn was written by Wolfgang Baur, James Jacobs, and George Strayton, and published in September 2004. Cover art was by Sam Wood, with interior art by Steve Belledin, Mitch Cotie, Ed Cox, Dennis Crabapple McClain, Steve Ellis, David Griffith, David Hudnut, Dana Knutson, Doug Kovacs, and Dan Scott.

This book follows two other books, Sandstorm and Stormwrack, which also deal with specific environments.

== Reviews ==
- Black Gate #9 (Fall 2005)
- Coleção Dragon Slayer
