= Book of Vile Darkness =

Dungeons & Dragons supplement

- Cover of Book of Vile Darkness for the 3rd edition of Dungeons & Dragons
- Author: Monte Cook (3rd edition); Robert J. Schwalb (4th edition)
- Genre: Role-playing game
- Publisher: Wizards of the Coast
- Publication date: October 1, 2002 (3rd edition); December 27, 2011 (4th edition)
- Media type: Print (Hardback)
- Pages: 192
- ISBN: 0-7869-2650-3
- OCLC: 51034940

Book of Vile Darkness is an optional supplemental sourcebook for the 3rd edition of the role-playing game Dungeons & Dragons. The book was written by Monte Cook and published by Wizards of the Coast on October 1, 2002. Described as a "detailed look at the nature of evil", it was the first Dungeons & Dragons book labelled for mature audiences.

Another Book of Vile Darkness was published for the 4th edition of Dungeons & Dragons on December 27, 2011, written by Robert J. Schwalb.

== Before release ==
Ed Stark, Design Manager for the D&D game at Wizards of the Coast at the time, explained to Pyramid that "the idea for BoVD grew out of both the initial success of the new edition of Dungeons & Dragons game and the excitement about 'nostalgia' products such as Return to the Temple of Elemental Evil. The new D&D game promised people the same 'back to the dungeon' feel 1st Edition provided, but with all the improvements twenty-plus years can put on a game system."

As with most new products, Wizards of the Coast announced and previewed Book of Vile Darkness on its website during the months before its release. Unlike other products, previewer Mat Smith revealed virtually no hard details about the book's contents because the book "is being released as a 'Mature Audiences Only' title." Instead, he stressed that this book was something its developers felt had been requested by the community, something that "many, many gamers have been asking for." Also, as part of the promotion of the book, Paizo Publishing included sealed "mature" sections in both official Dungeons & Dragons magazines. Dragon issue 300 included flesh and skin themed magic, while an adventure printed in Dungeon issue 95, "The Porphyry House of Horror", called on players to infiltrate a harem in order to disrupt a sacrificial orgy intended to turn the city's residents into fiends.

Tracy Hickman, author and co-creator of the Dragonlance campaign setting, distributed an angry response to Dragon 300 in a mailing-list newsletter entitled "D20 Terrorism". Hickman described both the Dragon content and the then-unreleased Book of Vile Darkness as "excrement" and as "cheap, trashy and demeaning." Following repeated references to the Comic Book Code, he stated, "Every dark fear that mothers and clergy across America have about D&D is now, suddenly, true. In one stroke, I watched everything Laura [Curtis] and I had worked toward for the last 25 years come crashing to the ground."

Following the statement from Hickman and amid substantial debate in the online community, Paizo president Johnny Wilson issued a statement defending the magazine material. He drew comparisons between the growing Book of Vile Darkness controversy and that involving the video game Mortal Kombat. He also argued that "publishing a guide to the atrocities and perversions that put the VILE in EVIL" allows role-playing that is "truly heroic" in contrast, while citing real-world examples of horror and heroism, such as the September 11, 2001 attacks, the Vietnam War, and World War II. Nevertheless, he did offer a partial apology, remarking that the introductory content outside the sealed sections was "as offensive (or more so)" than what was within them.

Game designer Dale Donovan noted in Pyramid: "The fact that both the 300th issue of Dragon and issue #95 of Dungeon had sealed, "mature content" sections incited more than one Internet flame war, with lots of folks flying off the handle in this direction or that, numerous invectives being tossed back and forth like hot potatoes, and scores of teeth gnashed for one reason or another. All that, and the book wasn't even out yet."

== Content and support ==
Book of Vile Darkness introduced several new mechanics relating to evil in Dungeons & Dragons, including rules for drug use, demonic possession, torture, and ritual sacrifice. It introduced 18 new prestige classes and two player character sub-races, Vashar and Jerren. Like most supplemental source books, it included new spells, feats, and magic items. Some, including corrupt spells and vile feats, introduced new mechanics supporting evil characters. Also included were several of the archdevils and demon lords, such as Asmodeus and Orcus, updated for the third edition.

The cover art was created by Henry Higginbotham, with interior art by Daren Bader, Thomas Baxa, Matt Cavotta, Brian Despain, Jeff Easley, Scott Fischer, Lars Grant-West, Quinton Hoover, Jeremy Jarvis, Raven Mimura, Vinod Rams, Wayne Reynolds, David Roach, Richard Sardinha, Brian Snoddy, Arnie Swekel, and Anthony Waters.

Wizards of the Coast provided additional support for the book through its website, including rules clarifications, details on additional archfiends, adaptations of Book of Vile Darkness content to epic levels, and even a screensaver.

Monte Cook was asked about his concerns in determining the content of the book: "My primary concern was, 'What will Wizards of the Coast let me get away with?' The answer turned out to be 'pretty much anything.' I didn't push it as far as I could have, though, and that made some people happy and others disappointed. Ultimately, the content in the book is as vile as I'd want from a book."

== Reception ==
Ken Gustafson of Silven Publishing authored a positive outlook. Gustafson wrote in August 2003, "Overall, Book of Vile Darkness is quite possibly the best supplement that Wizards of the Coast has put out in recent memory."

== Reviews ==
- Backstab #45 (as "Les Chapitres Interdits")
- Coleção Dragão Brasil

== Influence ==
Much of the content and concepts of Book of Vile Darkness have since been reprinted or adapted in source books without the "Mature Audiences Only" label. Rules for drug use had, in fact, already been printed, while later material included corrupt spells, vile feats, possession, and detailed discussions of demon lords.

== Within the game ==
Within the fictional worlds of the game, the book of vile darkness (also sometimes capitalized as Book of Vile Darkness) is a supernatural book that serves as a reference guide to evil and granting experience points and a bonus to the wisdom attribute of evil spellcasters, while harming or corrupting those of other alignments. Although listed as a magical item in the second edition, the history of this tome and its copies is first detailed in the supplemental source book that shares its name. In the 3.5 revision, the book of vile darkness is in the Dungeon Master's Guide, where it is considered a minor artifact. For the fifth edition, the Dungeon Master's Guide lists the book as an artifact rarity wonderous item, penned by the lich-god Vecna.

The book can be found in the adventure #9448 Temple, Tower, & Tomb (1994).

== In other media ==
The film Dungeons & Dragons 3: The Book of Vile Darkness, using the name of the supplemental sourcebook, was released August 2012.
