= Monster Mythology =

1992 tabletop role-playing game supplement

- Author: Carl Sargent
- Genre: Role-playing game
- Publisher: TSR
- Publication date: May 1992

Monster Mythology, published by TSR in 1992, is a sourcebook about non-human deities that can be used in fantasy role-playing games using the second edition rules for Advanced Dungeons & Dragons (AD&D).

== Description ==
Monster Mythology is a 128-page leatherette-bound trade paperback written by Carl Sargent, with interior artwork by John and Laura Lakey, Keith Parkinson, and Terry Dykstra. It was the fourth book in the Dungeon Master's Guide Rules series that was created for the second edition of AD&D. The purpose of the book is to detail non-human deities, which, to that point, had not been described for this edition of AD&D. As author Shannon Applecline points out, "Though the book is putatively a 'monster' mythology, it actually contains deities for demihumans, humanoids, and monsters alike." It contains detailed information on the societies, cultures, myths, and deities of several non-human pantheons, including those of the elves, dwarves, gnomes, halflings, orcs, goblins, dragons, giants, drow, and many other creatures. Keith Eisenbeis suggests the book can be thematically divided in two, with the first encompassing typical player character races, and the second detailing "gods of the major intelligent societal creatures".

== Contents ==
=== Introduction ===
The introduction sets out the theme of the book — non-human deities — and provides notes on using deities in a campaign, their common abilities, and how they are arranged in four tiers of power from Demigod up to Greater God.

=== The Gods ===
The majority of the book describes 131 divine beings, divided into eight mythos sections. Each entry includes a description, some game statistics including the deity's alignment, the most common alignment of its worshippers, the god's area of control, and the god's symbol). Each section also describes the god's avatar and priesthood.

Section	Patronage	Gods listed
Gods of Demihumans	Elves	Aerdrie Faenya, Corellon Larethian, Erevan Ilesere, Fenmarel Mestarine, Hanali Celanil, Labelas Enoreth, Lafarallinn, Sehanine Moonbow, Solonor Thelandira
Gods of Demihumans	Dwarves	Abbathor, Berronar Truesilver, Clanggedin Silverbeard, Dugmaren Brightmantle, Dumathoi, Gnarldan Steelshield, Moradin, Muamman Duathal, Vergadain
Gods of Demihumans	Gnomes	Baervan Wildwanderer, Baravar Cloakshadow, Flandal Steelskin, Gaerdal Ironhand, Garl Glittergold, Nebelun, Segojan Earthcaller, Urdlen
Gods of Demihumans	Halflings	Arvoreen, Brandobaris, Cyrrollalee, Kaldair Swiftfoot, Sheela Peryroyl, Urogalan, Yondalla
Goblinoid Deities	Orcs	Bahgtru, Gruumsh, Gertreg, Ilneval, Luthic, Shargraas, Yurtus
Goblinoid Deities	Goblins	Bargivyek, Khurgorbaeyag, Maglubiyet, Nomog-Geaya
Goblinoid Deities	Bugbears	Grankhul, Hruggek, Skiggaret
Goblinoid Deities	Kobolds	Gaknulak, Kurtulmak
Goblinoid Deities	Other Goblinoids	Kuraulyek, Meriadar, Stalker
Gods of the Underdark	Drow	Kiaransalee, Lolth, Vhaeraun, Zinzerena
Gods of the Underdark	Underdark Dwarves	Diinkarazan, Diirinka, Laduguer
Gods of the Underdark	The Lost Gods	The Dark God, The Elder Elemental God, Juiblex
Gods of the Underdark	Illithids	Ilsensine, Maanzecorian
Gods of the Underdark	Myconids	Psilofyr
Gods of the Underdark	Beholders	Great Mother, Gzemnid
Gods of the Underdark	Svirfnebli	Callarduran Smoothhands
Gods of the Giants		Annam, Diancastra, Grolantor, Hiatea, Iallanis, Karontor, Memnor, Skoraeus Stoneboes, Stronmaus
The Interloper Gods		Baphoment, Gorellik, Kostchchie, Vaprak, Yeenoghu
Gods of the Seas and Skies		Deep Sashelas, Demogorgon, Eadro, Jazirian, Koriel, Panzuriel, Persana, Quorlinn, Remnis, Sekolah, Stillsong, Surminare, Syranita, Trishina, Water Lion
Gods of the Scaly Folk		Bildoolpoolp, Laogzed, Merrshaulk, Parrafaire, Ramenos, Semuanya, Sess'Innek, Shekinester
Gods of Dragons		Aasterinian, Bahamut, Chronepsis, Faluzure, Io, Tiamat
Gods of the Dark Folk		Balador, Cegilune, Daragor, Eshebala, Ferrix, Kanchelsis, Mellifleur, Squerrik
The Sylvan Gods		Caoimhin, Damh, Eachthighern, Emmantiensien, Nathair Sgiathach, Oberon, Queen of Air and Darkness, Skerrit, Squelaiche, Titania, Verenestra

==== Appendix 1: Avatars in Game Play ====
This section gives some further advice on how avatars may be developed in play, such as where an avatar might make its home, when it might become a patron of a group of adventurers or take on an adventurer as a sidekick, require rescue, lose a magic item, need to be found by player characters, or become enamored with a mortal character.

==== Appendix 2: Deities and Game Worlds ====
This short appendix gives references where a Dungeon Master may find 2nd edition AD&D details on the deities of specific game worlds, such as the Forgotten Realms, Greyhawk, Dragonlance, and Dark Sun.

== Reception ==
In the May-June 1993 edition of White Wolf Magazine (Issue 36), Keith Eisenbeis thought Monster Mythology was a "good product", but believed that the priests described were too powerful and unbalanced the game. Additionally, Eisenbeis thought inequities in the ability of priests to advance based on race were unfair. Overall, he gave the book an average rating of 3 out of 5.

Writing in 2014, Shannon Appelcline called author Carl Sargent "one of TSR's best-respected authors in the 90s", and commented that this book "more than doubled the count of humanoid, demihuman, and monstrous deities. In particular it detailed new gods for underdark races like beholders, illithids, myconids, and svirfnebli, new undersea gods, new draconic gods, and new faerie gods (including Shakespearian favorites Titania and Oberon)."

== See also ==
- List of Dungeons & Dragons deities
