= On Hallowed Ground =

1996 role-playing game accessory by Colin McComb

- Author: Colin McComb
- Cover artist: Robh Ruppel
- Language: English
- Publisher: TSR, Inc.
- Publication date: October 1996
- Pages: 192
- ISBN: 978-0-7869-0430-3

On Hallowed Ground is an accessory book for the Advanced Dungeons & Dragons fantasy role-playing game, for the Planescape campaign setting.

== Contents ==
This book contains information about the planar domains of deities from 20 separate pantheons. New ideas and rules for priest characters on the planes are included, as well as tips on creating, visiting and surviving divine realms, comprehensive appendices listing gods by pantheon and portfolio, and planar maps.

== Publication history ==
On Hallowed Ground was written by Colin McComb, and was published by TSR in October 1996 as a 192-page book. The book features cover art by Robh Ruppel, and interior art by Brian Despain, Brian Fox, Lubov, and Adam Rex.

== Reception ==
Trenton Webb reviewed On Hallowed Ground for Arcane magazine, rating it a 6 out of 10 overall. Webb begins the review by saying: "God does exist. It says so in On Hallowed Ground, a new Planescape tome which proceeds to lay bare the dark on every deity in the multiverse, detailing their powers, potential, phone number and e-mail address. In essence Planescape is the unifying setting for all the 'official' AD&D worlds, and these established settings sit alongside Planescape's own unique planes. Together they supply the variety and extremes that make travelling the multiverse so exciting. The downside about this catch-all position is that the system is honour bound to obey all the other systems' dictates, rules and various foibles." He commented: "This doesn't pose a problem on a basic level because each plane is a totally contained, self-sufficient system and play obeys the 'local' rules. Gods, however, make for some major problems because the influence of these big boys extends beyond their home plane." Webb continues: "Hallowed Ground's solution is to supply functional details of the various pantheons and their patches, to serve as a source and setting for Planescape adventures. These descriptions are then supported by a theological system that's palatable and logical enough to tackle the thorny problem of the simultaneous existence of several supreme beings. The godly descriptions combine excellent information and characterful portraits. Dealt with on a pantheon-by-pantheon basis, the attitudes and aims of all significant powers - demi, lesser, intermediate and greater - are explained with clear brevity. It doesn't get weighed down trying to explain hit dice, spell lists or special attacks because there's no need. These guys are Gods and no character, no matter how hard, is going to fight them and win. The interaction that will happen will take the form of omens, via proxies, or if players are very lucky, conversations with the big man himself. And there's information aplenty for that kind of tomfoolery. The theology of Hallowed Ground is progressive, clearly explaining just how priests gain spells and the benefits to be had from planar proximity to a 'chosen one.' The suggested optional rules, though, don't do enough to balance the priest's loss of levels, suffered for straying far from his God's home, to make clerics an enjoyable class to play in a Planescape setting." He added: "The suggested Power Key solution to this problem, whereby Gods can give priests artefacts that allow them to cast their spells at full power wherever they are, is intriguing though. The award of one to any player priest will not only supply great roleplay opportunity, but motive power for all manner of holy quests." Webb concluded his review by saying, "On Hallowed Ground is an excellent book, but far from an essential purchase because the opportunities to use its information are so rare. What's more, the very clarity of its theology could make the lives of Planescape player priests far too complex to be any fun."
