= List of Dungeons & Dragons adventures =

This is a list of official Dungeons & Dragons adventures published by Wizards of the Coast as separate publications. It does not include adventures published as part of supplements, officially licensed Dungeons & Dragons adventures published by other companies, official d20 System adventures and other Open Game License adventures that may be compatible with Dungeons & Dragons.

Officially published adventures from before 3rd edition are often called modules. For a list of modules published prior to 3rd Edition Adventures, see List of Dungeons & Dragons modules.

== 3rd edition ==
Hellspike Prison

Hellspike Prison is the second in the "Fantastic Adventure" series of small booklet-sized combat-oriented adventure modules produced by WotC. The 16-page booklet contains the text of the adventure and two separate 12" x 17" double-sided maps showing Hellspike Prison, Temple of the Prismatic Flame, Magma Keep and Mushroom Cavern.

In the adventure, designed for four D&D characters of 9th level, the player characters, while searching for kidnapped villagers, encounter the servants of Kazarzikal, an evil devil who intends to use his prisoners to summon other devils. With these new allies, the devil plans to confront the beholder who guards the only means of accessing the broken fragment of the Hellspike in order to restore it and open a portal to the infernal planes. The adventurers must get to the Hellspike before him and destroy it before Kazarzikal can fully activate it.

In 2005, WotC released Fane of the Drow, the first in a series of small 16-page combat-oriented adventures titled Fantastic Locations that were produced to promote WotC's line of Dungeons & Dragons Miniatures. The second adventure was Hellspike Prison, written by Matthew Sernett, also published in 2005, with cover art was by Francis Tsai, and interior art by Wayne England. WotC also published an optional PDF expansion for more powerful adventurers titled Scaling UP Hellspike Prison. WotC would go on to produce four more adventures in the Fantastic Locations line between 2005 and 2007.

The adventures listed here are official Wizards of the Coast Dungeons & Dragons 3/3.5 adventures only. The first 3rd Edition adventure module published (not counting OGL/d20 STL modules) by Wizards of the Coast was The Sunless Citadel, in 2000.

Number	Title	Levels	Author(s)	Published	Setting	Notes
953827400	Scourge of the Howling Horde	01	Gwendolyn F.M. Kestrel	2006	D&D Generic Setting	
B0002181	Caves Of Shadow	3*	Monte Cook	2000	D&D Generic Setting	Stand alone game with pre made characters used to teach how to play D&D. Uses a different dice system.
11640	The Sunless Citadel	01–03	Bruce R. Cordell	2000	D&D Generic Setting	
B0001723	The Fright at Tristor	01–03	Keith Polster	2001	Living Greyhawk	
0786941960	The Shattered Gates of Slaughtergarde	01–06	David Noonan	2006	D&D Generic Setting	
959767400	Barrow of the Forgotten King	02-04	Ed Stark	2007	D&D Generic Setting	
86410	Shadows of the Last War	02	Keith Baker	2004	Eberron	
11644	The Forge of Fury	03–05	Richard Baker	2000	D&D Generic Setting	Ranked 12th greatest adventure of all time.
86430	Whispers of the Vampire's Blade	04	David Noonan	2004	Eberron	
95003	Fantastic Locations: Fane of the Drow	04	Gwendolyn F.M. Kestrel	2005	Special maps for use with miniatures	
11843	Return to the Temple of Elemental Evil	04–14	Monte Cook	2001	Greyhawk	Sequel to T1-4 The Temple of Elemental Evil; Ranked 8th greatest adventure of all time.
957557400	Fantastic Locations: The Frostfell Rift	04–18	Ari Marmell	2006	Special maps for use with miniatures	
959777400	Eyes of the Lich Queen	05-09	Stephen Schubert	2007	Eberron	
10797740	The Sinister Spire	05	Bruce R Cordell & Ari Marmell	2007	D&D Generic Setting	
11830	The Speaker in Dreams	05–07	James Wyatt	2001	D&D Generic Setting	
953857400	Red Hand of Doom	06–12	James Jacobs & Richard Baker	2006	D&D Generic Setting	
11730	Grasp of the Emerald Claw	06	Bruce R. Cordell	2005	Eberron	
953937200	Expedition to Castle Ravenloft	06–10	Bruce R. Cordell & James Wyatt	2006	Ravenloft	
95363	Voyage of the Golden Dragon	07	Nicolas Logue	2006	Eberron	
109277400	Fortress of the Yuan-Ti	07	Ari Marmell	2007	D&D Generic Setting	
11838	The Standing Stone	07–09	John D. Rateliff	2001	D&D Generic Setting	(minor references to Greyhawk)
95364	Fantastic Locations: Fields of Ruin	08	Richard Pett	2006	Special maps for use with miniatures	
109257200	Expedition to the Ruins of Greyhawk	08–13	Jason Bulmahn, James Jacobs & Erik Mona	2007	World of Greyhawk	update of WGR1 Greyhawk Ruins
95004	Fantastic Locations: Hellspike Prison	09	Matthew Sernett	2005	Special maps for use with miniatures	
955687200	Expedition to the Demonweb Pits	09–12	Wolfgang Baur and Gwendolyn F. M. Kestrel	2007	D&D Generic Setting	
953777400	Fantastic Locations: Dragondown Grotto	10	Ed Stark	2006	Special maps for use with miniatures	
11847	Heart of Nightfang Spire	10–13	Bruce R. Cordell	2001	D&D Generic Setting	
11855	Deep Horizon	13–15	Skip Williams	2001	D&D Generic Setting	
88163	Lord of the Iron Fortress	15–17	Andy Collins	2002	D&D Generic Setting	
88167	Bastion of Broken Souls	18–20	Bruce R. Cordell	2002	D&D Generic Setting	
959787400	Fantastic Locations: City of Peril	-	Ed Stark	2007	D&D Generic Setting	

Additionally Wizards published a series of Free Online Adventures on their website from 2000 to 2005. This is the complete list of adventures, with links to the original presentation articles.

Title	Levels	Author(s)	Published	Edition	Notes
Burning Plague, The	01	Miguel Duran	08/01/2000 PDF Archive Map File	3.0	
Ettin's Riddle, The	02-03	JD Wiker	09/01/2000	3.0	
Base of Operations	05	Ed Stark	10/01/2000	3.0	
Vessel of Stars, The	04	Robert Holzmeier	11/01/2000	3.0	
Alchemist's Eyrie, The	06	Edward Bolme	12/15/2000	3.0	
Ghosts of Aniel, The	06	Stephen Kenson	01/12/2001	3.0	
One Last Riddle	05-07	David Eckelberry	02/02/2001	3.0	
Manifesting: A Tale	03	Angel Leigh McCoy	03/30/2001	3.0	
Something's Cooking	02	Andy Collins	04/13/2001	3.0	
Tower of Deception, The	09	Monte Cook	05/25/2001	3.0	
Frigid Demise, A	13	Monte Cook	06/08/2001	3.0	
Ministry of Winds, The	06	Monte Cook	07/20/2001	3.0	
Eye for an Eye, An	08	Monte Cook	08/24/2001	3.0	
Fang, Beak, and Claw	08	Sean K. Reynolds	09/26/2001	3.0	
Sea Witch, The	10	Jason Carl	10/05/2001	3.0	
Secret of the Windswept Wall, The	02-04	Eric Haddock	10/21/2001	3.0	
Harvest of Evil, A	10–12	Jason Carl	11/30/2001	3.0	
House of Harpies	06	Owen K. C. Stephens	12/21/2001	3.0	
Icy Heart, An	20	Eric Haddock	01/25/2002	3.0	
Desert Sands	13	Gwendolyn F. M. Kestrel	02/23/2002	3.0	
Crumbling Hall of the Frost Giant Jarl, The	10	Andy Collins	03/29/2002	3.0	
Black Rain	16	Monte Cook	04/27/2002	3.0	
Start at the End	07	Rich Redman	06/28/2002	3.0	
Question of Ethics, A	12	Monte Cook	07/26/2002	3.0	
Tiger's Palace	09-10	Owen K. C. Stephens	08/30/2002	3.0	
Self-Fulfilling Prophecy?	11	Gwendolyn F. M. Kestrel	09/28/2002	3.0	
Test of the Demonweb	06	Ramon Arjona	10/26/2002	3.0	
Haunting Lodge	17	Owen K. C. Stephens	11/30/2002	3.0	
Treasure of the Black Veils, The	07-09	Skip Williams and Penny Williams	12/06/2002	3.0	
Thicker Than Water	12	Monte Cook	12/27/2002	3.0	
Into the Frozen Waste	07	Eric Cagle	01/11/2003	3.0	
Ill Wind in Friezford	14	Skip Williams and Penny Williams	01/31/2003	3.5	
Shoals of Intrigue	08	Robert Wiese	02/28/2003	3.5	
Temple of Redcliff, The	10	Eric Cagle	03/29/2003	3.5	
Environmental Impact	08	Ramon Arjona	04/25/2003	3.5	
Stone Dead	14	Stan!	05/30/2003	3.5	
Road to Oblivion	11	Penny Williams	06/14/2003	3.5	
Fallen Angel	05	Ramon Arjona	06/29/2003	3.0	
Eye of the Sun, The	04	Eric Cagle	07/25/2003	3.5	
Bad Moon Waning	10	Stan!	08/30/2003	3.5	
Hasken's Manor	07	Scott Brocius and Mark A. Jindra	09/26/2003	3.5	
Sheep's Clothing	11	Robert Wiese	10/31/2003	3.5	
Matters of Vengeance	15	Darrin Drader	11/28/2003	3.5	
Lochfell's Secret	15	Eric Haddock	01/09/2004	3.5	
War of Dragons	18	Robert Wiese	02/27/2004	3.5	
Force of Nature	18	Mark A. Jindra	03/26/2004	3.5	
Wreck Ashore	01	Robert Wiese	04/30/2004	3.5	
Frozen Whispers	03	James Jacobs	05/29/2004	3.5	
Dry Spell	03	Darrin Drader	06/26/2004	3.5	
Bad Light	04	Owen K. C. Stephens	07/31/2004	3.5	
March of the Sane	05	Owen K. C. Stephens	08/27/2004	3.5	
Primrose Path	06	Owen K. C. Stephens	09/24/2004	3.5	
Tarus's Banquet!	10	Sean K Reynolds	10/15/2004	3.5	
Lest Darkness Rise	07	Owen K. C. Stephens	10/29/2004	3.5	
Cave of the Spiders	09	Skip Williams	11/26/2004	3.5	
Thunder Below, The	17	James Jacobs	12/25/2004	3.5	
Shrine of the Feathered Serpent	12	By Skip Williams	12/30/2004	3.5	
To Quell the Rising Storm	10	Christopher Lindsay	01/28/2005	3.5	
White Plume Mountain	07	Andy Collins, Gwendolyn F.M. Kestrel, and James Wyatt	12/07/2005	3.5	
Tower in the Ice	09	Christopher Lindsay	02/25/2005	3.5	
A Dark and Stormy Knight	01	Owen K. C. Stephens	03/29/2005	3.5	
Fait Accompli	12	Owen K. C. Stephens	05/17/2005	3.5	
Tomb of Horrors	09	Gary Gygax, Bruce R. Cordell	10/31/2005	3.5	
Legend of the Silver Skeleton	06	Bart Carroll, Todd Clayton, Mark A. Jindra, and Robert Wiese	10/17/2006	3.5	
Return to the Temple of the Frog	10	Ted Albert	02/23/2007	3.5	
The Last Breaths of Ashenport	06	Ari Marmell	12/07/2007	3.5	

== 4th edition ==
The first official Wizards of the Coast 4th edition adventure published was Keep on the Shadowfell in 2008.

=== Adventure Path series ===
The Adventure Path series of the 4th Edition, named Scales of War takes place in the Elsir Vale and is a sequel of the adventure The Red Hand of Doom from D&D3.5, focusing on the cult of Tiamat.

Title	Levels	Author(s)	Published	Notes
Rescue at Rivenroar	1-2	David Noonan	Dungeon 156 (July 2008)	Elsir Vale
Siege of Bordrin's Watch, The	3	Robert J. Schwalb	Dungeon 157 (August 2008)	Elsir Vale
Shadow Rift of Umbraforge, The	4-5	Scott Fitzgerald Gray	Dungeon 158 (September 2008)	Elsir Vale
Lost Mines of Karak, The	6	Greg A. Vaughan with James Larrison	Dungeon 159 (October 2008)	Elsir Vale
Den of the Destroyer	7-8	Rodney Thompson	Dungeon 160 (November 2008)	Elsir Vale
Temple Between, The	9	Ari Marmell	Dungeon 161 (December 2008)	Elsir Vale
Fist of Mourning	10	Robert J. Schwalb	Dungeon 162 (January 2009)	Elsir Vale
Beyond the Mottled Tower	11	Creighton Broadhurst, Bruce R. Cordell & David Noonan	Dungeon 163 (February 2009)	Elsir Vale
Haven of the Bitter Glass	12-13	Kevin Kulp	Dungeon 164 (March 2009)	Elsir Vale
Alliance at Nefelus	14	Chris Tulach	Dungeon 165 (April 2009)	Elsir Vale
Throne of the Stone-Skinned King	15-16	Logan Bonner	Dungeon 166 (May 2009)	Elsir Vale
Garaitha's Anvil	17-18	Scott Fitzgerald Gray	Dungeon 167 (June 2009)	Elsir Vale
Tyranny of Souls, A	19-20	Robert J. Schwalb	Dungeon 168 (July 2009)	Elsir Vale
Betrayal at Monadhan	21	David Noonan	Dungeon 170 (September 2009	Elsir Vale
Grasp of the Mantled Citadel	22-23	Creighton Broadhurst	Dungeon 171 (October 2009)	Elsir Vale
Legacy of Io	24	Daniel Marthaler	Dungeon 172 (November 2009)	Elsir Vale
Those Once Loyal	25-26	Robert J. Schwalb	Dungeon 173 (December 2009)	Elsir Vale
Test of Fire	27-29	Scott Fitzgerald Gray	Dungeon 174 (January 2010)	Elsir Vale
Last Breath of the Dragon Queen	30	David Noonan	Dungeon 175 (February 2010)	Elsir Vale

=== H series ===
H—Heroic tier adventures were designed for characters of level 1–10. This series can stand alone, or can be used before the P series and E series to begin a campaign from 1st to 30th level, focusing on the cult of the demon prince Orcus.

Code	Title	Levels	Author(s)	Published	Notes
H1	Keep on the Shadowfell	1–3	Bruce Cordell, Mike Mearls	May 20, 2008	Nentir Vale
H2	Thunderspire Labyrinth	4–6	Richard Baker, Mike Mearls	July 15, 2008	Nentir Vale
H3	Pyramid of Shadows	7–10	Mike Mearls, James Wyatt	August 19, 2008	Nentir Vale

=== HS series ===
HS—Heroic Standalone tier adventures were designed for characters of level 1–10. Adventures in this series were designed to be used stand alone and not as part of a multi-adventure campaign.

Code	Title	Levels	Author(s)	Published	Notes
HS1	The Slaying Stone	1	Logan Bonner	May 18, 2010	Generic D&D setting
HS2	Orcs of Stonefang Pass	5	Logan Bonner	July 20, 2010	Nentir Vale

=== P series ===
P—Paragon tier adventures were designed for characters of level 11–20. This series can stand alone, or can be used in between the H series and E series to continue a campaign from 1st to 30th level, focusing on the cult of the demon prince Orcus.

Code	Title	Levels	Author(s)	Published	Notes
P1	King of the Trollhaunt Warrens	11–13	Richard Baker, Logan Bonner	October 21, 2008	Generic D&D setting
P2	Demon Queen's Enclave	14–16	David Noonan, Chris Sims	December 16, 2008	Generic D&D setting
P3	Assault on Nightwyrm Fortress	17–20	Bruce R. Cordell	March 17, 2009	Generic D&D setting

=== E series ===
E—Epic tier adventures were designed for characters of level 21–30. This series can stand alone, or can be used following the H series and P series to conclude a campaign from 1st to 30th level, focusing on the cult of the demon prince Orcus.

Code	Title	Levels	Author(s)	Published	Notes
E1	Death's Reach	21–23	Bruce R. Cordell, Chris Sims	April 21, 2009	Generic D&D setting
E2	Kingdom of the Ghouls	24–26	Wizards RPG team	June 16, 2009	Generic D&D setting
E3	Prince of Undeath	27–30	Wizards RPG team	October 20, 2009	Generic D&D setting

=== Dark Sun Setting ===
All the following adventures are set in the Dark Sun campaign settings.

Title	Levels	Author(s)	Published
Vault of Darom Madar, The	1	Aeryn “Blackdirge” Rudel	Dungeon 181 (August 2010)
Marauders of the Dune Sea	2–5	Bruce Cordell	August 17, 2010
Revenge of the Marauders	5-7	Bruce R. Cordell	Dungeon 183 (October 2010)
Beneath the Dust	7-9	Jared Espley	Dungeon 187 (February 2011)

=== Eberron Settings ===
All the following adventures are set in the Eberron campaign settings.

Title	Levels	Author(s)	Published
Keep on the Shadowfell : Eberron Conversion	1-4	Stephen Radney-MacFarland	Dungeon 155 (June 2008)
Khyber's Harvest	2	Keith Baker	June 2009
Seekers of the Ashen Crown	2-5	Chris Sims, Scott Fitzgerald Gray	July 21, 2009
Heart of the Forbidden Forge	7	Luke Johnson	Dungeon 167 (June 2009)
Maze of Shattered Souls	15	James Wyatt	Dungeon 177 (April 2010)

=== Forgotten Realms Settings ===
All the following adventures are set in the Forgotten Realms campaign settings.

Title	Levels	Author(s)	Published	Notes
Keep on the Shadowfell : Forgotten Realms Conversion	1-4	Greg Bilsland	Dungeon 155 (June 2008)	
Shards of Selûne	1-3	Andrew G. Schneider	Dungeon 193 (August 2011)	
Barrow of the Ogre King (Forgotten Realms Campaign Guide)	1	Wizards RPG Team	August 2008	Loudwater
Menace of the Icy Spire	2	Sean Molley	Dungeon 159 (October 2008)	Loudwater
Gauntlgrym Gambit, The	3-5	Daniel Marthaler	Dungeon 193 (August 2011)	
That Which Never Sleeps	3-5	Daniel Marthaler	Dungeon 195 (October 2011)	
Hidden Destinies	5	Brian Cortijo	Dungeon 175 (February 2010)	
Five Deadly Shadows, The	5-7	Téos Abadia	Dungeon 195 (October 2011)	
Monument of the Ancients	13	Brian R. James & Matt James	Dungeon 170 (September 2009	
Spiral Gate, The	16	Scott Fitzgerald Gray	Dungeon 180 (July 2010)	

=== Other ===
Title	Levels	Author(s)	Published	Notes
Dungeon Master's Guide – Kobold Hall	1	Wizards RPG Team	June 6, 2008	Nentir Vale
The Keep on the Borderlands, Chapter 1: A Season of Serpents	1	Chris Sims	September, 2010	Nentir Vale
Dungeon Delve	1–30	David Noonan, Bill Slavicsek	March 3, 2009	Generic D&D setting
The Last Breaths of Ashenport	8	Ari Marmell	Dungeon 156 (July 2008)	Generic D&D Setting
Revenge of the Giants	12–17	Bill Slavicsek, Mike Mearls, David Noonan	August 18, 2009	Generic D&D setting
Tomb of Horrors	10–22	Ari Marmell, Scott Fitzgerald Gray	July 20, 2010	Generic D&D setting
Madness at Gardmore Abbey	6–10	Creighton Broadhurst	September 20, 2011	Nentir Vale

=== Essentials ===
These adventures were included in the boxed sets of the Essentials line.

Code	Title	Levels	Author(s)	Published	Notes
Essentials	Dungeons & Dragons Fantasy Roleplaying Game Starter Set (Red Box) – Twisting Halls	1	Wizards RPG Team	September 7, 2010	Nentir Vale
Essentials	Dungeon Master's Kit – Reavers of Harkenwold	2–3	James Wyatt, Jeremy Crawford	October 19, 2010	Nentir Vale
Essentials	Monster Vault – Cairn of the Winter King	4	Rodney Thompson, Matthew Sernett, Logan Bonner	November 16, 2010	Nentir Vale

== 5th edition ==
Promoted in playtest materials as Dungeons & Dragons Next, the fifth edition of Dungeons & Dragons was initially released in a staggered fashion through the second half of 2014. The Forgotten Realms was the initial default campaign setting for the edition.

In 2024, Wizards of the Coast revised the 5th Edition ruleset; this edition update is backwards-compatible.

=== D&D Next preview and edition-free adventures ===
Title	Author	Date	Type	Levels	Pages	ISBN
Vault of the Dracolich	Teos Abadia, Scott Fitzgerald Gray, Michael E. Shea	June 2013	Module	4	23	
Ghosts of Dragonspear Castle	Greg Bilsland, Bruce R. Cordell, Jeremy Crawford	August 15, 2013	Module	1-10	290	978-0-7869-6531-1
Confrontation at Candlekeep	Teos Abadia, Greg Bilsland, Shawn Merwin	August 15, 2013	Module	2	―	
Sundering Adventure I: Murder in Baldur's Gate	Greg Bilsland, Matthew Sernett, Steve Winter	August 15, 2013	Module	1-3	96	978-0-7869-6463-5
Sundering Adventure II: Legacy of the Crystal Shard	R.A. Salvatore with Jeffrey Ludwig, James Wyatt, and Matthew Sernett	November 2013	Module	1-3	96	978-0-7869-6464-2
Sundering Adventure III: Dreams of the Red Wizards: Scourge of the Sword Coast	Tito Leati, Matt Sernett, and Chris Sims	February 2014	Module	2	85	
Sundering Adventure IV: Dreams of the Red Wizards: Dead in Thay	Scott Fitzgerald Gray	April 29, 2014	Module	6-8	107	

=== Adventures ===
Title	Author	Date	Subject	Type	Levels	Pages	ISBN
Hoard of the Dragon Queen	Wizards RPG Team, Kobold Press	August 19, 2014	Set along the Sword Coast, the adventure follows the Cult of the Dragon as they raze settlements and amass vast wealth to orchestrate the apocalyptic release of the five-headed dragon goddess, Tiamat, from her prison in the Nine Hells.	Module	1–8	96	978-0-7869-6564-9
The Rise of Tiamat	Wizards RPG Team, Kobold Press	November 4, 2014	Continues from Hoard of the Dragon Queen and shifting into a political race against time, following cultists into hiding, recovering artifacts and facing ever increasing challenges against top tier prismatic dragons as the Cult prepares to finish the complex ritual of summoning Tiamat followed by an ultimate showdown against the five-headed dragon.	Module	8–15	96	978-0-7869-6565-6
Princes of the Apocalypse	Wizards RPG Team, Sasquatch Game Studios	April 7, 2015	―	Module	1–15	255	978-0-7869-6578-6
Out of the Abyss	Wizards RPG Team, Green Ronin	September 15, 2015	―	Module	1–15	256	978-0-7869-6581-6
Curse of Strahd	Wizards RPG Team	March 15, 2016	―	Module	1–10	256	978-0-7869-6598-4
Storm King's Thunder	Wizards RPG Team	September 6, 2016	―	Module	1–11	256	978-0-7869-6600-4
Tomb of Annihilation	Wizards RPG Team	September 19, 2017	―	Module	1–11	256	978-0-7869-6610-3
Waterdeep: Dragon Heist	Wizards RPG Team	September 18, 2018	―	Module	1–5	256	978-0-7869-6625-7
Waterdeep: Dungeon of the Mad Mage	Wizards RPG Team	November 20, 2018	―	Module	5–20	256	978-0-7869-6626-4
Baldur's Gate: Descent Into Avernus	Wizards RPG Team	September 17, 2019	―	Module	1–13	256	978-0-7869-6676-9
Icewind Dale: Rime of the Frostmaiden	Wizards RPG Team	September 15, 2020	―	Module	1–12	319	978-0-7869-6698-1
The Wild Beyond the Witchlight	Wizards RPG Team	September 21, 2021	―	Module	1–8	256	978-0-7869-6727-8
Critical Role: Call of the Netherdeep	Wizards RPG Team	March 15, 2022	―	Module	3–12	224	978-0-7869-6786-5
Dragonlance: Shadow of the Dragon Queen	Wizards RPG Team	December 6, 2022	―	Module	1–11	224	978-0-7869-6828-2
Tyranny of Dragons	Wizards RPG Team, Kobold Press	January 17, 2023	Rerelease with a new art cover.	Module	1–15	192	978-0-7869-6865-7
Phandelver and Below: The Shattered Obelisk	Wizards RPG Team	September 19, 2023	Revised and expanded version of the Lost Mine of Phandelver adventure.	Module	1–12	220	978-0-7869-6900-5
Vecna: Eve of Ruin	Wizards RPG Team	May 21, 2024	―	Module	10–20	256	978-0-7869-6947-0
2024 revision of 5th Edition
Arcana Unleashed: Deadfall	Wizards RPG Team	September 15, 2026	A Red Wizards themed adventure featuring Thay's magical society and a wizard war. Corresponds with the upcoming Arcana Unleashed (2026) supplement as part of the "Season of Magic".	Module	11-20	128	9780786970100

=== Adventure anthologies ===
Title	Author	Date	Subject	Type	Levels	Pages	ISBN
Tales from the Yawning Portal	Wizards RPG Team	April 4, 2017	Includes 7 adventures	Anthology	1–15	248	978-0-7869-6609-7
Ghosts of Saltmarsh	Wizards RPG Team	May 21, 2019	Includes 7 adventures	Anthology	1–12	256	978-0-7869-6675-2
Candlekeep Mysteries	Wizards RPG Team	March 16, 2021	Includes 17 adventures	Anthology	1–16	224	978-0-7869-6722-3
Journeys through the Radiant Citadel	Wizards RPG Team	July 19, 2022	Includes 13 adventures	Anthology	1–14	224	978-0-7869-6799-5
Keys from the Golden Vault	Wizards RPG Team	February 7, 2023	Includes 13 adventures	Anthology	1–11	208	978-0-7869-6896-1
Quests from the Infinite Staircase	Wizards RPG Team	July 30, 2024	Includes 6 adventures	Anthology	1–13	256	978-0-7869-6949-4
2024 revision of 5th Edition
Dragon Delves	Wizards RPG Team	July 8, 2025	Includes 10 adventures themed around the five chromatic and the five metallic dragons.	Anthology	1–12	192	9780786969982
Adventures in Faerûn	Wizards RPG Team	November 11, 2025	Corresponds with Heroes of Faerûn (2025) as part of the Forgotten Realms bundle.	Anthology	1–13	TBA	9780786969951

=== Boxed or starter sets adventures ===
Title	Author	Date	Subject	Type	Levels	Pages	ISBN
Lost Mine of Phandelver	Wizards RPG Team	July 15, 2014	Included in 2014 Starter Set	Module	1–5	64	978-0-7869-6559-5
Hunt for the Thessalhydra	Wizards RPG Team	May 1, 2019	Included in Stranger Things Starter Set	Module	3–4	24	
Dragon of Icespire Peak	Wizards RPG Team	September 3, 2019	Included in Essentials Kit	Module	1–7	64	978-0-7869-6683-7
The Lost Dungeon of Rickedness	Wizards RPG Team	November 19, 2019	Included in Rick and Morty Set	Module	1–3	44	978-0-7869-6688-2
Dragons of Stormwreck Isle	Wizards RPG Team	July 31, 2022	Included in 2022 Starter Set	Module	1–3, 5	48	978-0-7869-6559-5
Light of Xaryxis	Wizards RPG Team	August 16, 2022	Included in Spelljammer: Adventures in Space	Module	5–8	64	978-0-7869-6816-9
Turn of Fortune's Wheel	Wizards RPG Team	October 17, 2023	Included in Planescape: Adventures in the Multiverse	Module	3–10, 17	96	978-0-7869-6904-3

== See also ==
- List of Dungeons & Dragons modules – for adventure modules up until the publication of 3rd Edition D&D
- A Guide to Official DnD 5e Adventure Modules (2024) - for another version of the same list
