= 2009 ENnie Award winners =

- Awarded for: Best role-playing games of previous year
- Country: United Kingdom & United States
- Presented by: Gen Con
- First award: 2001

The following are the winners of the 9th annual ENnie Awards, held in 2009:

== List of winners ==
Category	Gold Winner	Silver Winner
Best Cover Art	CthulhuTech, Catalyst Game Labs	Pathfinder #19: Howl of the Carrion King, Paizo Publishing
Best Interior Art	Dark Heresy Core Rulebook, Fantasy Flight Games	Mouse Guard, Kunoichi/Archaia Studios Press
Best Cartography	Pathfinder Chronicles Second Darkness Map Folio, Paizo Publishing	Star Wars: Scum and Villainy, Wizards of the Coast
Best Writing	Kobold Quarterly, Open Design	Don't Rest Your Head, Evil Hat Productions
Best Production Values	Dark Heresy Core Rulebook, Fantasy Flight Games	Mouse Guard, Kunoichi/Archaia Studios Press
Best Rules	Dungeons & Dragons 4th Ed. Players Handbook, Wizards of the Coast	A Song of Ice and Fire Roleplaying, Green Ronin Publishing
Best Adventure	Pathfinder #19: Howl of the Carrion King, Paizo Publishing	King of the Trollhaunt Warrens, Wizards of the Coast
Best Monster or Adversary	Dungeons & Dragons 4th Ed. Monster Manual, Wizards of the Coast	Dark Heresy Creatures Anathema, Fantasy Flight Games
Best Setting	Pathfinder Campaign Setting, Paizo Publishing	Swashbucklers of the 7 Skies, Atomic Sock Monkey / Evil Hat Productions
Best Supplement	CthulhuTech Vade Mecum, Catalyst Game Labs	Star Wars: The Clone Wars, Wizards of the Coast
Best Aid or Accessory	D&D Insider, Wizards of the Coast	Kobold Quarterly, Open Design
Best Miniature Product	Game Mastery Flip-Mat: Waterfront Tavern, Paizo Publishing	DU1 Halls of the Giant Kings Dungeon Tiles, Wizards of the Coast
Best Regalia	Battletech: The Corps, Catalyst Game Labs	Art of Exalted, White Wolf Publishing
Best Electronic Book	Collection of Horrors: Razor Kids, White Wolf Publishing	Tales of Zobek: An Anthology of Urban Adventures, Open Design
Best Free Product	Song of Ice and Fire Quickstart Rules, Green Ronin Publishing	Swords and Wizardry, Mythmere Games
Best Website	Obsidian Portal	Kobold Quarterly
Best Podcast	All Games Considered	Order 66
Best Game	Dungeons & Dragons 4th Edition, Wizards of the Coast	Dark Heresy Core Rulebook, Fantasy Flight Games
Product of the Year	Dungeons & Dragons 4th Edition, Wizards of the Coast	Mouse Guard, Mouse Guard, Kunoichi/Archaia Studios Press
Fan Award Best Publisher	Wizards of the Coast	Paizo Publishing
