= The Wild Beyond the Witchlight =

Dungeons & Dragons adventure module

- Rules required: Dungeons & Dragons, 5th edition
- Character levels: 1-8
- Campaign setting: Feywild
- First published: September 21, 2021
- Pages: 256
- ISBN: 9780786967278

The Wild Beyond the Witchlight is an adventure module set in the Feywild for the 5th edition of the Dungeons & Dragons fantasy role-playing game.

== Contents ==
The Wild Beyond the Witchlight is designed to take player characters from level 1 to level 8 in the first 5th Edition adventure set in the Feywild. It is setting neutral allowing the Dungeon Master to transition the players from any starting location to the Prismeer, a Feywild domain of delight, via the Witchlight Carnival with two plot hook options. Prismeer has been fractured into three realms (Hither, Thither, and Yon) and is ruled by a coven of hags who overthrew the archfey Zybilna. The players traverse the domain to thwart each of the hags.

The book expands on game elements for the 5th edition, such as:

- All encounters have non-combat options to resolve conflict
- Storytelling tools for the Dungeon Master such as a story tracker, roleplaying cards, and maps
- Two new character races — the fairy and the harengon (humanoid rabbits)
- Two new character backgrounds — "the Feylost (for characters who grew up in the Feywild) and the Witchlight Hand (for characters who work at the Witchlight Carnival)"
- 32 new character traits, 21 magic items themed around the Feywild, 13 non-player characters, and 18 monsters
- Characters from the 1980s AD&D action figure line return in this module

== Publication history ==
A Displacer Beast on the alternate print cover. Art by Hydro74.

The new module was officially announced on June 7, 2021, however, this announcement occurred after the product was leaked through an Amazon product listing. It was released on September 21, 2021. The standard cover was designed by the artist Tyler Jacobson. An alternate art cover edition, designed by the artist Hydro74, of the book is only available through local game stores. The storytelling tools for the Dungeon Master are also included in the PDF supplement Domains of Delight (2021) which can be printed out. Chris Perkins, the principal story designer for Wizards of the Coast, is the book's story lead, and the writers are Stacey Allan, Will Doyle, and Ari Levitch.

SyFy Wire highlighted that "traditionally, the Feywild is an alternate plane of existence that mirrors and overlaps the material world. It’s a place of perpetual twilight that’s full of both enticing beauty and terrible dangers. Time works differently inside the Feywild, and those who leave may find what they thought was a brief venture instead lasted years — assuming they’re even able to leave at all. In short, it’s a good place for a magical and eerie adventure". On the Feywild setting, Perkins said:

The plane itself has almost a transformative quality. It responds to emotions. If you’re feeling sad and you sit next to a rock in the Feywild, an expression of sadness might actually form in the rock; or the clouds overhead might start to take the shape of a sad face. But if you’re feeling happy and joyous, and you’re dancing around in the glade, you might find that the flowers in the glade seem to sway or dance with you; that you can exert as a creature of the Feywild some influence over your environment. [...] It’s not all whimsy, but it’s not all dark, Brothers Grimm. It sort of blends it all together, but gives the DM license to kind of lean one way or the other, to sort of give it the atmosphere that they know their players will respond to most.

The book is also available as a digital product through the following Wizards of the Coast licensees: D&D Beyond, Fantasy Grounds, and Roll20.

== Related products ==
=== Unearthed Arcana ===
The Unearthed Arcana series is the 5th edition public playtest where the content released is "a near-final draft of the rules"; parts of The Wild Beyond the Witchlight was developed through this playtest. New character races indigenous to the Feywild premiered in Folk of the Feywild (May 2021) which presented the Fairy, the Hobgoblin, the Owlfolk, and the Rabbitfolk as playable options. CBR reported that "Folk of the Feywild is the game's second Unearthed Arcana released after Tasha's Cauldron of Everything. Like the previous set of playtest material, Gothic Lineages, it makes use of a particular design philosophy implemented in Tasha's: the removal of race-specific ability score improvements".

=== Domains of Delight ===
Domains of Delight is a PDF supplement published on the Dungeon Masters Guild by Wizards of the Coast in September 2021; sale proceeds go to the Extra Life charity. It is an optional add-on to The Wild Beyond the Witchlight and establishes additional information on the Feywild such as the Seelie and Unseelie Courts, Fey Gifts and Hospitality, Fey contracts. It also includes information on building Feywild domains, creating an archfey, and converting pre-existing stat blocks into Fey themed stat blocks. On the decision to create an add-on supplement, Perkins said to Polygon:

When we were working on the Domains of Delight portion [of The Wild Beyond the Witchlight] we weren’t necessarily sure where it was going to land finally. It could have been in the book. It could have been a separate thing. Some of that was based on just how the adventure was flowing. [...] Ultimately, it was pretty much my call to keep it separate from the rest of the adventure simply because a section of the adventure that big that doesn’t have anything to do with the narrative of The Wild Beyond the Witchlight seemed a little odd.

Both Charlie Hall, for Polygon, and Christian Hoffer, for ComicBook.com, commented that Domains of Delight is "advertised in The Wild Beyond the Witchlight" which is "the first time that Wizards has promoted a DMs Guild publication" within "a physical D&D book". Hoffer also highlighted that "as part of the Domains of Delight release, the DMs Guild also teamed up with several creators to produce several 'Dungeoncraft Spotlight' adventures. These adventures use the rules and tips from Domains of Delight and can be used either as accessories to The Wild Beyond the Witchlight or as standalone adventures".

== Reception ==
In Publishers Weekly's "Best-selling Books Week Ending September 25, 2021", The Wild Beyond the Witchlight was #6 in "Hardcover Nonfiction" and sold 16,484 units; the following week it slipped to #19 with 5,077 units sold. In USA Today's "Best-Selling Books List for September 30, 2021", The Wild Beyond the Witchlight was #16.

Charlie Hall, for Polygon, called The Wild Beyond the Witchlight "one of the very best products released for D&D’s 5th edition" with "a marvelous premise, and perhaps the single best tutorial for D&D that Wizards has yet published — better even than the lauded Dungeons & Dragons Essentials Kit". Hall commented that "what impressed me most is just how many big swings The Wild Beyond the Witchlight takes, including set-piece events that are the complete opposite of pitched battles". Hall also highlighted that this module breaks many from many traditional aspects of D&D such as encouraging the party to split up and a push towards conflict resolution through role-playing. The module has a strong focus on storytelling that necessitates a session zero where players create their characters together with the Dungeon Master.

Simon Yule, for GeekDad, wrote that this adventure module makes "the Dungeon Master role of facilitator as straight forward as possible" with "the most useful part of this book are the roleplaying cards and story tracker. I don’t remember seeing anything quite so detailed and useful in previous 5th edition campaign books, but I hope these both feature in ones to come". Yule highlighted that the book has a strong opening chapter and commented that "another highlight for me in this campaign is how seemingly minor interactions at different stages of the campaign can have significant implications later on. For instance, at the carnival in chapter one, characters might give a button to a talking monkey, successfully ride a giant dragonfly, or impress an eloquent giant eagle. Later on, if they find themselves prisoners in the Feywild, that same monkey might provide the key to their escape; they might discover a new talent for dragonfly riding which impresses some cranes in chapter four; or put to use some newly acquired debating skills to pacify a rampaging threat at the story’s climax". Yule found the module to be a fun exploration of the Feywild with a focus on role-playing over "hack ‘n’ slash" gameplay.

Christian Hoffer, for ComicBook.com, called the Witchlight Carnival "one of the strongest opening set pieces for a D&D adventure". Hoffer highlighted that this adventure module is nontraditional and does not use the "more rigid structure" utilized in other 5th edition modules such as Baldur's Gate: Descent Into Avernus (2019) and Icewind Dale: Rime of the Frostmaiden (2020). Hoffer preferred the plot hook that tied player characters to the Feywild and wrote that "another major push of The Wild Beyond the Witchlight's marketing is that players can progress through the adventure without resorting to combat. [...] This is an admirable addition, but it also highlights a weakness of Fifth Edition design – the lack of social mechanics and the imbalance that some classes would have if violence isn't the preferred option. Simply put, playing as a martial-focused class would not be fun if players chose The Wild Beyond the Witchlight's non-violent route. [...] The weakest chapter by far in The Wild Beyond the Witchlight is the final chapter which features the return of several D&D characters from the 1980s line of toys and one big surprise. To be frank, this entire chapter felt more like a sideshow than anything else, with characters that younger players and newcomers won't particularly care about and an ending 'twist' that will likely generate some controversial discourse amongst the fanbase". Overall, Hoffer thought the book was ambitious with the design team moving out of their comfort zone "and while not every concept works, it still is an interesting and unique campaign unlike anything else Wizards of the Coast has put out for Dungeons & Dragons in Fifth Edition".
