= Dragonlance: Shadow of the Dragon Queen =

Role-playing game adventure

- Rules required: Dungeons & Dragons, 5th edition
- Character levels: 1-11
- First published: 2022
- ISBN: 9780786968282

Dragonlance: Shadow of the Dragon Queen is an adventure module for the 5th edition of the Dungeons & Dragons fantasy role-playing game. A deluxe edition includes a Dungeon Master's Screen and a Warriors of Krynn board game.

== Summary ==
On Krynn, the world of the Dragonlance campaign setting, the dragon queen Takhisis attacks the nation country Solamnia. The players must defeat the death knight Lord Soth and his army of draconians.

== Reception ==
A review for Wargamer praised the plot, handling of mass combat, difficulty and attempt at moral nuance. It criticized the non-player characters as forgettable and calls one chapter filler.

A review for GamesRadar+ described Dragonlance: Shadow of the Dragon Queen as an improvement on past Dragonlance adventures and praised its writing, large scale, character options and roleplay alternatives for fights. However, it criticized the prelude adventures for low level characters as badly written and designed and notes that the high fantasy tone can come across as humorless.
