= Prince of Undeath =

Dungeons & Dragons adventure module

- Rules required: Dungeons & Dragons, 4th edition
- Character levels: 27-30
- Authors: Bruce R. Cordell and Scott Fitzgerald Gray
- First published: October 2009

Prince of Undeath is an adventure module for the 4th edition of the Dungeons & Dragons fantasy role-playing game.

== Plot summary ==
Prince of Undeath is an epic-level D&D adventure designed to take characters from 27th to 30th level. In this adventure, the demon lord Orcus tries to usurp the Raven Queen's power over death using a shard of evil plucked from the depths of the Abyss. This adventure can be played as a stand-alone adventure or as the conclusion of a three-part series that spans 10 levels of gameplay.

== Publication history ==
E3 Prince of Undeath was published in 2009, and was written by Bruce R. Cordell and Scott Fitzgerald Gray, with art by Jason Engle, Adam Gillespie, Mari Kolkowsky, William O'Connor, Wayne Reynolds, Jon Schindehette, Matias Tapia, and Ben Wootten.
