= Phandelver and Below: The Shattered Obelisk =

Role-playing game adventure

- Rules required: Dungeons & Dragons, 5th edition
- Character levels: 1-12
- First published: 2023
- ISBN: 9780786969005

Phandelver and Below: The Shattered Obelisk is an adventure module for the 5th edition of the Dungeons & Dragons fantasy role-playing game. It is an extension of the 2014 starter adventure Lost Mine of Phandelver.

== Summary ==
The inhabitants of Phandalin, a village on the Sword Coast in the Forgotten Realms, are threatened by a secret cult that intends to abduct them and turn them into mind flayers.

== Reception ==
A review for Comic Book Resources praised the adventure for its pacing in introducing players to the setting and to horror themes, as well as for its dungeon crawls and artwork.

A review for Wargamer praised the adventure for its atmosphere and detail, its creative choices that avoid stereotypical plot points and for creating memorable characters. However, it criticized the written help for running the adventure as inconsistent and how the adventure abruptly transitions from a beginner-friendly adventure to a horror-themed game.
