= Princes of the Apocalypse =

D&D 5e adventure module

- Rules required: Dungeons & Dragons, 5th edition
- Character levels: 1-15
- Campaign setting: Forgotten Realms
- First published: 7 April, 2015
- ISBN: 978-0786965786

Princes of the Apocalypse is an adventure module for the 5th edition of the Dungeons & Dragons fantasy role-playing game.

== Summary ==
Across the North of Faerûn, four different elemental cults have caused natural disasters by utilizing items called devastation orbs. Secretly, the cults have come together to unleash an unknown catastrophic force. These cults are devoted to the Princes of Elemental Evil and serve the Elder Elemental Eye. Each cult is led by a prophet:

- The air cult, Cult of the Howling Hatred, is led by the elf princess Aerisi Kalinoth
- The earth cult, Cult of the Black Earth, is led by the male medusa Marlos Urnrayle
- The fire cult, Cult of the Eternal Flame, is led by the tiefling Vanifer
- The water cult, Cult of the Crushing Wave, is led by the sailor Gar Shatterkeel

This campaign takes characters from level 1 through level 15 as adventurers battle the elemental cults across the North and work to uncover their true agenda. It is set in the Forgotten Realms year 1491 DR.

The adventure begins with small adventures to get to level three, and then the main adventure starts with a delegation from the dwarven city of Mirabar going missing. The delegation was kidnapped by cultists.

== Publication history ==
In January 2015, Wizards of the Coast announced their new Elemental Evil storyline which included their new adventure module Princes of the Apocalypse. Wizards of the Coast collaborated with Sasquatch Game Studios to produce this book. Princes of the Apocalypse draws inspiration from The Temple of Elemental Evil.

Princes of the Apocalypse was published on April 7, 2015. A free corresponding player's guide, Elemental Evil Player's Companion, was released earlier as a PDF on March 10, 2015. The spells and the genasi race from the Elemental Evil Player’s Companion are reprinted in the adventure's appendices, though the goliath and aarakocra races and the deep gnome subrace for gnomes are not reprinted in Princes of the Apocalypse.

== Reception ==
Jason Louv, for Boing Boing, wrote that "Princes of the Apocalypse is built as a sandbox adventure. This is a massive improvement over the Tyranny of Dragons campaign, which suffered from heavy railroading (the bane of all tabletop role-playing) and single-outcome adventures."

For SLUG Magazine's review, Henry Glasheen wrote that "I've found that many of the humanoid and elemental monsters fill in the challenge gaps left in their sections in the Monster Manual, making Princes of the Apocalypse an indispensable resource for creating my custom campaigns. [...] If you run Princes of the Apocalypse well, your players are going to be telling stories about it for the rest of your natural lifetime".

Shawn Ellsworth, for Tribality's review, wrote that "Elemental Evil: Princes of the Apocalypse is a flexible campaign that balances the line between a plot driven and sandbox campaign, providing exploration, investigation, temple delving and more."
