= The Forge of Fury =

Dungeons & Dragons adventure module

- Rules required: Dungeons & Dragons, 3rd edition
- Character levels: 3rd
- Authors: Richard Baker
- First published: 2000

Linked modules
- The Sunless Citadel; The Forge of Fury; The Speaker in Dreams; The Standing Stone; Heart of Nightfang Spire; Deep Horizon; Lord of the Iron Fortress; Bastion of Broken Souls

The Forge of Fury is an adventure module for the 3rd edition of the Dungeons & Dragons fantasy tabletop role-playing game.

== Plot summary ==
The Forge of Fury is a dungeon crawl, or site-based adventure, that describes the stronghold of Khundrukar. The renowned dwarven blacksmith, Durgeddin the Black, established the hidden stronghold of Khundrukar inside an enormous cavern system two centuries ago after his clan was overrun by orcs and driven out of their home. The orcs founded Khundrukar, Durgeddin's home, one hundred years earlier after capturing one of the dwarven clansmen. The orcs built a massive army which they used to assault the stronghold and kill the dwarves there. Goblins, orcs and other creatures now use the five levels of the ruins of the stronghold as a base. Legends contain stories of the amazing blades Durgeddin forged in anger, enticing the player characters to come to the ruins of Khundrukar to obtain them.

== Publication history ==
The book was published in 2000 and written by Richard Baker, with cover art by Todd Lockwood and interior art by Dennis Cramer.

Wizards re-released the adventure in 2017, updated to 5th Edition rules, as part of the Tales from the Yawning Portal collection.

== Reception ==
A reviewer from Pyramid commented that the "first few pages are very good at walking new Dungeon Masters through the steps needed to properly prepare for the adventure", also noting that "like the Sunless Citadel, the main focus is on the adventure." Conversely, an RPGnet review criticized the lack of hints in the package, but praised the adventure as following "in the mold of the great classics of the first edition".

The Forge of Fury was ranked as the 12th greatest Dungeons & Dragons adventure of all time by Dungeon magazine in 2004, on the 30th anniversary of the original Dungeons & Dragons game.

Dungeon Master for Dummies lists The Forge of Fury as one of the ten best adventures from the 3rd edition.

== Reviews ==
- Backstab #26
- Backstab #43 (as "La forge de Durgeddin")
- Campaign Magazine #1 (Aug./Sept., 2001)
- Realms of Fantasy
