= Assault on Nightwyrm Fortress =

Dungeons & Dragons game adventure

- Code: P3
- Rules required: 4th Edition Dungeons & Dragons
- Character levels: 17-21
- Campaign setting: Points of Light
- Authors: Bruce R. Cordell and Shawn Merwin
- First published: March 2009
- ISBN: 978-0-7869-5000-3

Linked modules
- P1 P2 P3

Assault on Nightwyrm Fortress is the third part of a three-part series of adventures belonging to the 4th edition Dungeons & Dragons concept of Points of Light, a loosely connected and open-ended setting designed to allow modules and Dungeon Masters created materials to be seamlessly integrated into either a single, largely unmapped fantasy world or a Dungeon Master custom made setting. The adventure, written by Bruce R. Cordell and Shawn Merwin, was published in March 2009 by Wizards of the Coast. The adventure is designed for character of levels 17-20 and the module code "P" stands for Paragon Tier. The adventure is largely set in the Shadowfell, an alternate plane of death and gloom mirroring the mortal realm.

== Contents ==
- A 32-page adventure book one booklet
- A 64-page adventure book two booklet
- A full-color poster map
- A light cardboard portfolio

== Publication history ==
The adventure was designed by Bruce R. Cordell and Shawn Merwin, and was published in March 2009. Cover art was by Jesper Ejsing, with interior art by Eric Belisle, Matias Topia, Todd Lockwood, and Vincent Dutrait. The product was re-released as a PDF in June 2014.
