= Deep Horizon =

Dungeons & Dragons adventure module

- Rules required: Dungeons & Dragons, 3rd edition
- Character levels: 13th
- Authors: Skip Williams
- First published: 2001
- ISBN: 0-7869-1855-1

Linked modules
- The Sunless Citadel * The Forge of Fury * The Speaker in Dreams * The Standing Stone * Heart of Nightfang Spire * Deep Horizon * Lord of the Iron Fortress * Bastion of Broken Souls

Deep Horizon is an adventure module for the 3rd edition of the Dungeons & Dragons fantasy role-playing game.

== Plot summary ==
In Deep Horizon, the subterranean humanoid race known as the desmodus are in danger of being eliminated by evil beholders and salamanders.

== Publication history ==
Deep Horizon was published in 2001, and was written by Skip Williams, with cover art by Brom and interior art by David Roach.

== Reception ==
The adventure was reviewed in Dragão Brasil (as "Horizonte Profundo") which commented that the adventure contains some enjoyable moments despite its flaws, and that its flexible structure could be repurposed creatively by the Dungeon Master, while the adventure is relatively easy to integrate into existing campaigns, which would help to overcome some of its structural or narrative flaws.
