= A Song of Ice and Fire Roleplaying =

Tabletop role-playing game

A Song of Ice and Fire Roleplaying is a role-playing game published by Green Ronin Publishing in 2009.

== Description ==
A Song of Ice and Fire Roleplaying is an adaptation of the A Song of Ice and Fire novel series. The game uses Green Ronin's "Chronicle System".

== Publication history ==
On 24 April 2007, it was on George R.R. Martin's website that Green Ronin Publishing was producing a new line of A Song of Ice and Fire RPG products, unrelated to the earlier Guardians of Order A Game of Thrones effort. Robert J. Schwalb designed the A Song of Ice and Fire Roleplaying game, which was previewed in 2008 and published in 2009; this was his last project for Green Ronin before he moved over to Wizards of the Coast. The Green Ronin game, titled A Song of Ice and Fire Roleplaying (SIFRP), went on sale on 10 March 2009: it uses a custom game system and does not contain rules from either the d20 or Tri-Stat dX systems.

== Reception ==
A Song of Ice and Fire Roleplaying won the 2009 Silver ENnie Award for Best Rules.
