= Demon Queen's Enclave =

Dungeons & Dragons adventure

- Code: P2
- Rules required: 4th Edition Dungeons & Dragons
- Character levels: 14-17
- Campaign setting: Points of Light
- Authors: David Noonan, Chris Sims
- First published: 2008
- ISBN: 978-0-7869-4977-9

Linked modules
- P1 P2 P3

Demon Queen's Enclave is the second part of a three-part series of adventures belonging to the 4th edition Dungeons & Dragons concept of Points of Light, a loosely connected and open-ended setting designed to allow modules and Dungeon Masters created materials to be seamlessly integrated into either a single, largely unmapped fantasy world or a Dungeon Master custom made setting. The adventure, written by David Noonan and Chris Sims, was published in 2008 by Wizards of the Coast. The adventure is designed for character of levels 14-17 and the module code "P" stands for Paragon Tier. This module is set on Phaervorul, a small drow settlement deep in the Underdark.

== Contents ==
- A 31-page adventure book one booklet
- A 64-page adventure book two booklet
- A full-color poster map
- A light cardboard portfolio

== Publication history ==
The adventure was designed by Chris Sims, Mike Mearls, and Robert J. Schwalb, and was published in December 2008. Cover art was by William O'Connor, with interior art by Dave Allsop, Concept Art House, Corey Turner, and Eric Williams.
