= Dungeon Delve =

2009 short adventure collection for Dungeons & Dragons

- Cover art by Wayne Reynolds
- Author: David Noonan, Bill Slavicsek
- Genre: Role-playing game
- Publisher: Wizards of the Coast
- Publication date: 2009
- Media type: Print
- Pages: 160
- ISBN: 978-0-7869-5139-0

Dungeon Delve is a collection of thirty short adventures or "delves" for the 4th edition of the Dungeons & Dragons role-playing game that was published by Wizards of the Coast (WotC) in 2009.

== Description ==
At early games conventions, small adventures designed to demonstrate a new role-playing game were called "delves." Dungeon Delve is a collection of mini-adventures for D&D characters of levels 1-30, with one adventure for each level. The adventures are designed to provide a gamemaster with an "instant adventure" that can be completed in one session. These would be either for sessions where the gamemaster does not have anything prepared, or to supplement the gamemaster's campaign.

Each adventure takes up six pages, with an introduction to the player's mission, the actual adventure, maps of the various encounter areas — and advice on how to adapt each map to WotC's Dungeon Tiles — and hints on how the gamemaster can flesh out the adventure. Each adventure includes three combat encounters with standard D&D monsters. Tactical advice on how to handle the combat is also included.

== Publication history ==
Dungeon Delve was written by David Noonan and Bill Slavicsek, and published by WotC in 2009, with interior art by Rob Alexander, Dave Allsop, Lee Moyer, and William O'Connor, cover art by Wayne Reynolds, cartography by Jason Engle, and additional material by David Christ, Greg Marks, Shawn Merwin, and Andrew Moore.

== Reception ==
Michael Harrison of Wired commented that "This book is mostly about creating a quick and easy gaming session where players can have it out with the DM's repertoire of ruffians." Harrison liked the maps included with each adventure, saying, "One of my favorite features is that each delve has fully illustrated maps on the page, but also tells you what set of Dungeon Tiles you can use to match them perfectly." Harrison's only complaint was that the adventures seemed a bit too straightforward and predictable, commenting "Most of [the adventures] involve bang-down-the-door style adventuring, and my only negative comment is that I wish some of the locations were a little more inspired. Last month's fantastic Manual of the Planes included a number of fun, fantastical planar encounters, and there's no reason Delve shouldn't have either." Nonetheless, he concluded, "If you don't have time to plan an evening of gaming, or if you just want to inject a few professionally crafted combat encounters into your campaign, Dungeon Delve delivers."

Guide du Rôliste Galactique noted that by using this book, gamemasters could "adjust the adventures to the level of the players with advice given at the beginning of the book."

Dragon Slayer called the book "a collection of small dungeons, for a fast-paced, uncompromising night of killing, looting, and exploring dark corridors" but asked "Is there any roleplaying or just combat?"
