= The Sinister Spire =

Dungeons & Dragons adventure module

- Rules required: Dungeons & Dragons, 3.5 edition
- Character levels: 5th
- Authors: Bruce R. Cordell and Ari Marmell
- First published: June 2007
- ISBN: 978-0-7869-4357-9

Linked modules
- DD1: Barrow of the Forgotten King * DD2: The Sinister Spire * DD3: Fortress of the Yuan-Ti

The Sinister Spire is an adventure module for the 3.5 edition of the Dungeons & Dragons fantasy role-playing game. It was released as one adventure in the three-part module for Barrow of the Forgotten King.

== Plot summary ==
The Sinister Spire begins where the waters of a sunless sea met a pebble-strewn shore, beyond which opens a wide Underdark vista shimmerling with pale cave-light. Titanic columns as big as castles in a line stretch miles into the misted distance. The player characters must explore the spire-city and face the terrors that lurk within.

== Publication history ==
The Sinister Spire was written by Bruce R. Cordell and Ari Marmell and was published in June 2007. Cover art was by Steve Prescott, with interior art by Wayne England.
