= Brian Hagan =

American artist

- Known for: Fantasy art

Brian Hagan is an artist whose work has appeared in role-playing games.

== Education ==
Brian Hagan graduated from Savannah College of Art and Design in 1994.

== Career ==
His Dungeons & Dragons work includes interior art and the back cover illustration for the fourth edition Dungeon Master's Guide (2008), and interior art for Dungeon Master's Guide II (2005), Spell Compendium (2005), Races of the Dragon (2006), Tome of Magic (2006), The Shattered Gates of Slaughtergarde (2006), Dragon Magic (2006), Cityscape (2006), Dungeonscape (2007), Magic Item Compendium (2007), Expedition to the Demonweb Pits (2007), Expedition to the Ruins of Greyhawk (2007), Pyramid of Shadows (2008), and Martial Power (2008).

He did art for the comic book series Pantheon.

He is known for his work on the Magic: The Gathering collectible card game.
