= Fortress of the Yuan-Ti =

Dungeons & Dragons adventure module

- Code: 109277400
- Rules required: Dungeons & Dragons, 3.5 edition
- Character levels: 7th
- Authors: Ari Marmell
- First published: September 2007

Linked modules
- DD1: Barrow of the Forgotten King * DD2: The Sinister Spire * DD3: Fortress of the Yuan-Ti

Fortress of the Yuan-Ti is an adventure module for the 3.5 edition of the Dungeons & Dragons fantasy role-playing game.

== Plot summary ==
Fortress of the Yuan-Ti is an adventure in which evil yuan-ti conspire to destroy a kingdom using dark rituals and the bones of a long-dead king. The player characters must storm the yuan-ti fortress and take the bones from the cultists before they complete their rituals and unleash a far greater menace upon the world.

== Publication history ==
Fortress of the Yuan-Ti was written by Ari Marmell, and was published in September 2007. Cover art was by Steve Prescott, with interior art by Dave Griffith.
