= Lord of the Iron Fortress =

Dungeons & Dragons adventure module

- Rules required: Dungeons & Dragons, 3rd edition
- Character levels: 15th
- Authors: Andy Collins
- First published: 2002

Linked modules
- The Sunless Citadel * The Forge of Fury * The Speaker in Dreams * The Standing Stone * Heart of Nightfang Spire * Deep Horizon * Lord of the Iron Fortress * Bastion of Broken Souls

Lord of the Iron Fortress is an adventure module for the 3rd edition of the Dungeons & Dragons fantasy role-playing game.

== Plot summary ==
This 48-page book begins with a two-page introduction. According to the adventure background provided, the plot involves the Blade of Fiery Might once wielded by the sultan of the efreet, which was destroyed and scattered across the planes. Imperagon, a half-duergar/half-dragon and ruler of the Iron Fortress of Zandikar on the plane of Acheron, has been reforging the sword using the trapped spirits of the greatest forgemasters of history as slave labor. Imperagon intends to wield the ancient blade at the head of a great army to conquer and build a kingdom on the Material Plane, with allies among the drow, the illithids, and fellow natives of the evil Outer Planes. The adventure begins when the player characters investigate events involving local craftsmen, following the trail of clues to the city of Rigus, which leads into the plane of Acheron. Once there, the characters encounter formian settlers from Mechanus, whose hive can serve as a base of operations while preparing an assault on the Iron Fortress. If successful in defeating the golems and steel predators that guard the fortress, the characters may breach its walls and destroy Imperagon's works. The book contains four appendices. Appendix I contains the statistics for the non-player characters encountered throughout the adventure. Appendix II contains statistics for new monsters, including the axiomatic creatures template, the bladeling, and the steel predator. Appendix III contains statistics for two new spells and four new magic items (including the Blade of Fiery Might). Appendix IV contains statistics for four pregenerated player characters, recommended for use in case the players require extra player characters.

== Publication history ==
The book was published in January 2002, and was written by Andy Collins. Cover art was by Todd Lockwood and interior art by David Day and Wayne Reynolds.

== Reception ==
Lord of the Iron Fortress won the 2002 Gold Ennie Award for "Best Art (Cover)".

Dungeon Master for Dummies lists Lord of the Iron Fortress as one of the ten best 3rd edition adventures.
