= Fantastic Locations: Fane of the Drow =

Dungeons & Dragons adventure module

- Rules required: Dungeons & Dragons, 3.5 edition
- Character levels: 4th
- Authors: Gwendolyn F.M. Kestrel
- First published: September 2005

Fantastic Locations: Fane of the Drow is an adventure module for the 3.5 edition of the Dungeons & Dragons fantasy role-playing game.

== Premise ==
In Fantastic Locations: Fane of the Drow, the player characters must aid a group of dwarves deep beneath the earth, as their mithril mines come under attack from drow raiders.

== Publication history ==
Fantastic Locations: Fane of the Drow was written by Gwendolyn F.M. Kestrel, and was published in September 2005. Cover art was by Mark Sasso, with interior art by Chad Sergesketter.
