= The Standing Stone =

Tabletop role-playing game supplement

- Rules required: Dungeons & Dragons, 3rd edition
- Character levels: 7th
- Authors: John D. Rateliff
- First published: 2001

Linked modules
- The Sunless Citadel * The Forge of Fury * The Speaker in Dreams * The Standing Stone * Heart of Nightfang Spire * Deep Horizon * Lord of the Iron Fortress * Bastion of Broken Souls

The Standing Stone is an adventure module for the 3rd edition of the Dungeons & Dragons fantasy role-playing game.

== Plot summary ==
In The Standing Stone, a tiefling sorcerer named Dyson discovers a circle of standing stones constructed centuries ago by druids to hold their annual rituals; the druid community was later destroyed by the great dragon Ashardalon. Dyson uses the magic of the stones to replace people with animals transformed into humanoid form, loyal to him. Dyson encounters the player characters in the village of Ossington and tries to manipulate them into eliminating the remaining enemies standing in his way.

== Publication history ==
The Standing Stone was published in 2001, and was written by John D. Rateliff, with cover art by Jeff Easley and interior art by Dennis Cramer.

== Reviews ==
- Backstab #31
- Backstab #48 (as "Le Cercle de Pierres")
- Dragão Brasil
