= The Sunless Citadel =

Dungeons & Dragons adventure module

- Rules required: 3rd edition
- Character levels: 1st
- Campaign setting: Generic
- Authors: Bruce Cordell
- First published: 2000
- ISBN: 0-7869-1640-0

Linked modules
- The Sunless Citadel * The Forge of Fury * The Speaker in Dreams * The Standing Stone * Heart of Nightfang Spire * Deep Horizon * Lord of the Iron Fortress * Bastion of Broken Souls

The Sunless Citadel is an adventure module originally published in 2000 for the 3rd edition of the Dungeons & Dragons fantasy role-playing game.

== Plot summary ==
This 32-page book begins with a two-page introduction. According to the adventure background provided, the plot involves a fortress that became buried under the earth many years ago, and thereafter was referred to as the Sunless Citadel. Inside the core of the citadel the horrible Gulthias Tree grows, cared for by the evil druid known as Belak the Outcast. This Tree bears magical fruit that both gives and steals life, as well as evil creatures known as twig blights. The adventure starts with player characters hearing rumors about the citadel while staying in the nearby small town of Oakhurst. The majority of the adventure then focuses on the characters exploring the citadel and encountering the malign creatures that have taken up residence within, such as kobolds and goblins. The characters eventually come upon the Twilight Grove and its blighted foliage, where they find the Gulthias Tree and encounter the druid Belak. He explains that the tree grew from a yet-green wooden stake that had been used to kill a vampire on that very spot, and the tree accepts humanoids bound to its bole as "supplicants", making the victims completely subservient to its will. A three-page appendix at the back of the book features statistics for all of the creatures encountered in the adventure, as well as three new magic items and the twig blights.

== Publication history ==
The book was published in 2000, and was written by Bruce R. Cordell, with cover art by Todd Lockwood and interior art by Dennis Cramer.

In 2017, Wizards re-released the adventure updated to 5th Edition rules as part of the Tales from the Yawning Portal collection.

== Reception ==
The reviewer from Pyramid comments: "Unlike some adventures, this one encourages the GM to award the players experience to advance levels during game play so that they are powerful enough to handle latter encounters."

Dungeon Master for Dummies lists The Sunless Citadel as one of the ten best 3rd edition adventures.

== Reviews ==
- Backstab #24
- Backstab #43 (as "La citadelle des ténèbres")
- Coleção Dragão Brasil
