= Cityscape (Dungeons & Dragons) =

Dungeons & Dragons source book

- cover of Cityscape
- Author: Ari Marmell and C.A. Suleiman
- Genre: Role-playing game
- Publisher: Wizards of the Coast
- Publication date: November 2006
- Media type: Print (Hardback)
- Pages: 160
- ISBN: 0-7869-3939-7

Cityscape is an optional supplemental source book for the 3.5 edition of the Dungeons & Dragons fantasy roleplaying game.

== Contents ==
This book was written specifically for Dungeon Masters, and details how to create and effectively run campaigns centered around cities (and less often, towns).

The book is divided into five chapters, each concerned with a particular aspect of urban world building. The first chapter, The Scope of the City, is concerned with general city-building for Dungeon Masters. Secondly, The Urban Adventurer, gives new spells and abilities for player characters based in an urban setting. The third chapter, Politics and Power, discusses the interactions and behaviors of organizations within a city. The fourth chapter, Events and Encounters, gives examples and plans regarding encounters in an urban environment. Lastly, Running the City clears miscellaneous features as well as giving directions for narrative and world building.

== Publication history ==
Cityscape was written by Ari Marmell and C.A. Suleiman, and was published in November 2006. Cover art is by Jeff Nentrup, and interior art is by Dave Allsop, David Bircham, Daarken, Carl Frank, Brian Hagan, Jon Hodgson, Ralph Horsley, Michael Komarck, Howard Lyon, Warren Mahy, and Eva Widermann.

Ari Marmell explains the general philosophy for how the book examines D&D's cities: "While I don't know that C.A. and I had a single definable "philosophy" going into Cityscape, we did have a few specific goals and mandates. Perhaps the most important was that we wanted the book to provide the tools to make gaming in an urban environment as different an experience as the DM and players wanted it to be. While you certainly can use Cityscape as nothing more than a guide to running a "street crawl" or "sewer crawl" adventure, we tried to delve into much more depth than just that. We discussed how the construction and appearance of a city changes based on its social structure, location, and purpose. We provided all manner of tools for playing games that involve politics, guilds, contacts, and the like."
