= Keys from the Golden Vault =

Role-playing game adventure

- Rules required: Dungeons & Dragons, 5th edition
- Character levels: 1-11
- First published: February 2023
- ISBN: 9780786968961

Keys from the Golden Vault is an adventure module anthology for the 5th edition of the Dungeons & Dragons fantasy role-playing game with a heist theme.

== Summary ==
The adventures included are:

- The Murkmire Malevolence (Level 1)
- The Stygian Gambit (Level 2)
- Reach for the Stars (Level 3)
- Prisoner 13 (Level 4)
- Tockworth's Clockworks (Level 5)
- Masterpiece Imbroglio (Level 5)
- Axe from the Grave (Level 6)
- Vidorant's Vault (Level 7)
- Shard of the Accursed (Level 8)
- Heart of Ashes (Level 8)
- Affair on the Concordant Express (Level 9)
- Party at Paliset Hall (Level 10)
- Fire and Darkness (Level 11)

== Reception ==
A review for Screen Rant praised the variety of adventures and how they are structured to give players options despite revolving around a plot device or event. The review singled out "Affair on the Concordant Express" as a highlight.

A review for Wargamer noted that the adventures range from those that allow players to take the lead to dungeon crawls. It praised the creativity of the scenarios, and especially "Affair on the Concordant Express", but criticized the incomplete background of the adventures and a lack of practical support for Dungeon Masters when players overthink, as well as how much the adventures rely on player initiative and the lack of attention paid to timing.
