= Dragon Delves =

Role-playing game adventure

- Rules required: Dungeons & Dragons, 5th edition
- Character levels: 1-12
- First published: 2025
- ISBN: 9780786969982

Dragon Delves is an adventure module anthology for the 5th edition of the Dungeons & Dragons fantasy role-playing game. The anthology is the first release by Wizards of the Coast to use the revised 2024 rules of Dungeons & Dragons.

== Summary ==
The adventures included are:

- Death at Sunset (Level 1)
- Baker's Doesn't (Level 3, solo play option)
- The Will of Orcus (Level 4)
- For Whom the Void Calls (Level 5)
- The Dragon of Najkir (Level 7, solo play option)
- The Forbidden Vale (Level 9)
- Before the Storm (Level 10)
- Shivering Death (Level 11)
- A Copper for a Song (Level 12, solo play option)
- Dragons of the Sandstone City (Level 12)

== Reception ==
A review for Nerdist praised the adventures' usability for different play situations and their clever premises, including the conflict with heroic metallic dragons, as well as their unique art style. However, it criticized some adventures as intentional filler and that fleshing out the personalities of dragons is left to the Dungeon Master.

A review for Wargamer praised the art style and layout of the adventures and their options for non-violent and solo player style. However, it criticized a disappointing narrative that requires preparation by the Dungeon Master, and blamed this on an attempt to allow for easy customization. The reviewer stated that The Forbidden Vale has the only "story with moral complexity".
