= The Speaker in Dreams =

Dungeons & Dragons adventure module

- Rules required: Dungeons & Dragons, 3rd edition
- Character levels: 5th
- Authors: James Wyatt
- First published: 2001

Linked modules
- The Sunless Citadel * The Forge of Fury * The Speaker in Dreams * The Standing Stone * Heart of Nightfang Spire * Deep Horizon * Lord of the Iron Fortress * Bastion of Broken Souls

The Speaker in Dreams is an adventure module for the 3rd edition of the Dungeons & Dragons fantasy role-playing game.

== Plot summary ==
In The Speaker in Dreams, the town of Brindinford is besieged by evil forces under the command of Ghaerleth Axom. A street fair is interrupted by an attack, which serves as a distraction for the villain's forces to attack the keep of the local baron. This provides an entry point for the player characters into the main quest to discover the secret alliances trying to take over the town. The Speaker in Dreams is an event-based, rather than site-based, adventure.

== Publication history ==
The Speaker in Dreams was published in 2001, and was written by James Wyatt, with cover art by Jeff Easley and interior art by Dennis Cramer.

== Reception ==
The reviewer from Pyramid commented that unlike The Sunless Citadel and The Forge of Fury, "this isn't solely a site-based encounter. That's right, there's more than just running around the dungeon this time."

Dungeon Master for Dummies lists The Speaker in Dreams as one of the ten best 3rd edition adventures.

== Reviews ==
- Backstab #28
- Campaign Magazine #1 (Aug./Sept., 2001)
