= Dungeonscape =

2007 role-playing game supplement

- Author: Jason Bulmahn and Rich Burlew
- Cover artist: Michael Komarck
- Subject: Roleplaying games
- Genre: Fantasy
- Publisher: Wizards of the Coast
- Publication date: February 2007
- Pages: 160
- ISBN: 978-0-7869-4118-6

Dungeonscape is a supplement for the 3.5 edition of Dungeons & Dragons.

== Contents ==
Dungeonscape focuses on the finer points of the dungeon, the medium for adventure and danger in the Dungeons & Dragons game.

Dungeon masters may use this supplement to include new traps, monsters, descriptions, and rules for older dungeon-related errata.

Players may use the information in this book to shape their characters for the dungeon, including new feats, skills, prestige classes, and equipment.

Dungeonscape introduces a new base character class, the factotum (previously known as the journeyman), which uses an ability called "inspiration" to perform action such as to cast spells, master any skill, take extra actions, make sneak attacks, and attack with weapons. Other features of the class include trapfinding, the ability to heal other characters, and turn undead.

The book adds at least one alternative class ability to each of the standard D&D classes, designed to make a character better at dealing with situations encountered in dungeons. The book also provides new feats, new alchemical and magical items, and also new gear options, many of which were adapted from older supplements such as the Dungeoneer's Survival Guide.

The book also includes three prestige classes: the beast heart adept, which combines a druid's affinity for animals with similar skills to harness and befriend monsters; the trapsmith, a master of dealing with and placing magical and mechanical traps; and the dungeon lord, who has a variety of powerful abilities while in the character's own dungeon.

Dungeonscape has an entire chapter devoted to traps, devoted mostly to encounter traps, which function more like combat encounters - a concept introduced in Secrets of Xen'drik. Also included are rules to present high level standard traps, and information on how to design complex traps and other hazards.

The book also focuses on designing traditional dungeons, and stranger locations as well, and gives ideas on both mundane and unusual things to include in a dungeon. The book features monsters, including the ascomoid and rot grub swarm, and templates to import them into a dungeon or make them more deadly inhabitants.

== Publication history ==
Dungeonscape was released in February 2007, and was written by Jason Bulmahn and Rich Burlew. Cover art was by Michael Komarck, with interior art by Steven Belledin, Miguel Coimbra, Daarken, Wayne England, Emily Fiegenschuh, Carl Frank, Brian Hagan, Jon Hodgson, Ralph Horsley, Warren Mahy, Torstein Nordstrand, David Roach, and Franz Vohwinkel.

Bulmahn used the Tomb of Horrors module, as well as Indiana Jones, as inspiration for some of the traps in Dungeonscape. When deciding on equipment options for the book, the designers tried to focus on noncombat utility, and added items that help an adventurer deal with the sort of physical obstructions that are commonly found in dungeons.
