= Scott Fitzgerald Gray =

Canadian writer and game designer

Scott Fitzgerald Gray is a Canadian writer, editor, story editor, and role-playing game designer known for his work on the Dungeons & Dragons tabletop role-playing game.

== Biography ==
Gray was born in British Columbia, Canada, and has lived there most of his life. He started playing role-playing games in high school, and has spoken of how discovering Dungeons & Dragons was instrumental in helping him deal with depression and thoughts of suicide as a teenager. In the 1990s he lived in Vancouver, and wrote reviews for the Vancouver Sun. His wife is a retired schoolteacher, and they have two daughters.

After spending a number of years in publishing, he started freelancing in tabletop RPGs in 2004, working for Wizards of the Coast and a number of smaller companies. He has written and edited upwards of two hundred books, adventures, and articles. Gray was the editor of the fifth edition Monster Manual, and one of the editors of the Dungeon Master's Guide, the Player's Handbook, and the D&D Starter Set. He also worked for Penny Arcade as managing editor and co-creative director on the Acquisitions Incorporated (2019) book published by Wizards of the Coast.

Gray is an author of Secrets of Sarlona (2007). He wrote the third adventure for the Scales of War adventure path in 2009, "The Shadow Rift of Umbraforge". The 2010 version of Tomb of Horrors was written by Gray and Ari Marmell. He is known for the adventure Dead in Thay, written for the D&D Encounters series in 2014 during the D&D Next playtest for 5th edition, and updated to appear in the Tales from the Yawning Portal hardcover in 2017. He also wrote the ENnie-nominated The Hidden Halls of Hazakor (2018), a 5E starter adventure for young Dungeon Masters, published by his own Insane Angel Studios imprint. He was an editor on the Stranger Things Dungeons & Dragons Starter Set (2019).

In addition to his RPG work, Gray is the author of a number of fantasy novels and anthologies, including We Can Be Heroes (2012), a contemporary SF novel about gamers, whose character story draws on elements from his own life. He also wrote Sidnye (Queen of the Universe) (2013), a science fiction novel about a thirteen-year-old girl.

Gray spoke at a master class on writing at the 2021 Word on the Lake Writers' Festival in Salmon Arm, and he was among the cast of presenters for the 2022 Word on the Lake Writers' Festival.

== Awards ==
- Thieves’ World Player’s Manual (Green Ronin Publishing) — Editor — 2006 Honorable Mention ENnie Award for Best Supplement
- Monte Cook’s Arcana Evolved: Spell Treasury (Malhavoc Press) — Editor — 2006 Silver ENnie Award for Best Supplement
- King of the Trollhaunt Warrens (Wizards of the Coast) — Editor — 2009 Silver ENnie Award for Best Adventure
- Dungeons & Dragons Players Handbook (Wizards of the Coast) — Editor — 2015 Gold ENnie Awards for Best Rules, Product Of The Year; 2014 Origins Award for Best Role Playing Game
- Dungeons & Dragons Dungeon Masters Guide (Wizards of the Coast) — Editor — 2015 Gold ENnie Award for Best Supplement
- Dungeons & Dragons Monster Manual (Wizards of the Coast) — Editor — 2015 Gold ENnie Award for Best Monster/Adversary; 2014 Origins Award for Best Role Playing Supplement
- Dungeons & Dragons Players Handbook (Wizards of the Coast) — Editor — 2015 Gold ENnie Award for Best Game
- Dungeons & Dragons Starter Set (Wizards of the Coast) — Editor — 2015 ENnie Gold Award for Best Family Game
- Tales from the Yawning Portal (Wizards of the Coast) — Designer — 2017 ENnie Awards Judges’ Spotlight Winner
- The Dark of Hot Springs Island (Swordfish Islands) — Editor — 2018 Gold ENnie Award for Best Adventure.
- Sly Flourish's Return of the Lazy Dungeon Master (Last Word Audio) — Editor — 2019 Gold ENnie Award for Best Electronic Book
