= Emily Fiegenschuh =

American artist

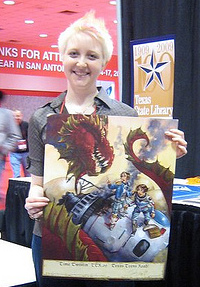
- Emily Fiegenschuh at the Texas State Library and Archives Commission Booth at Texas Library Association Conference in April 2009
- Known for: Fantasy art

Emily Fiegenschuh is an artist and children's book illustrator whose work has also appeared in role-playing games.

== Early life and education ==
Emily Fiegenschuh attended art school at the Ringling College of Art and Design in Sarasota, Florida, and graduated with honors and a BFA from the Illustration program in 2001.

== Career ==
Fiegenschuh has provided illustrations for a variety of published works, including the Young Adult novel series, Knights of the Silver Dragon, The Star Shard, by Frederic S. Durbin (Cricket Magazine), A Practical Guide to Dragons, A Practical Guide to Monsters, and A Practical Guide to Faeries, and several Dungeons & Dragons rulebooks for Wizards of the Coast, including Draconomicon (2003), Races of the Wild (2005), and Dungeonscape (2007).

She has painted illustrations for the Inuit Mythology Initiative, and received positive reviews for her illustrations of The Shadows That Rush Past: A Collection of Frightening Inuit Folktales, and Qanuq Pinngurnirmata: Inuit Stories of How Things Came to Be. She also published The Explorer's Guide to Drawing Fantasy Creatures (IMPACT Books, 2011).

Fiegenschuh is married to fellow artist Vinod Rams.
