= Bastion of Broken Souls =

Role-playing game supplement

- Rules required: Dungeons & Dragons, 3rd edition
- Character levels: 18th
- Authors: Bruce R. Cordell
- First published: 2002

Linked modules
- The Sunless Citadel * The Forge of Fury * The Speaker in Dreams * The Standing Stone * Heart of Nightfang Spire * Deep Horizon * Lord of the Iron Fortress * Bastion of Broken Souls

Bastion of Broken Souls is an adventure module for the 3rd edition of the Dungeons & Dragons fantasy role-playing game.

== Plot summary ==
In Bastion of Broken Souls, the great wyrm Ashardalon accumulates power, while one of the heads of the demon prince Demogorgon plots to use the player characters in its plan to slay the dragon and thereby gain enough power to destroy the other head and become a singular being.

== Publication history ==
Bastion of Broken Souls was published in March 2002, and was written by Bruce R. Cordell. Cover art was by Jeff Easley and interior art by David Roach.

Bruce Cordell was inspired to use Demogorgon in his design because the creature is his favorite demon prince.

== Reception ==
The reviewer from Pyramid notes that the adventure begins with a surprise attack of a singular nature during the characters' day-to-day activities. "[T]he attacker is a nine-foot-tall, six-armed fiend with the lower body of a snake and the upper of a nude woman, wielding multiple loops of animated barbed chain. The fact that the attack comes out of nowhere and seemingly without reason should grab the attention of the players and create all sorts of questions they will definitely want answered..." The reviewer writes that the adventure is designed to fit into any fantasy campaign, and that if the party successfully completes the adventure they should gain enough experience to advance beyond 20th level, and would therefore be suited to campaigns run with the Epic Level Handbook.
