= Pyramid of Shadows =

Dungeons & Dragons adventure module

- Code: H3
- Rules required: 4th Edition Dungeons & Dragons
- Character levels: 7-10
- Campaign setting: Nentir Vale
- Authors: Mike Mearls, James Wyatt
- First published: 2008
- ISBN: 978-0-7869-4935-9

Linked modules
- H1 H2 H3

Pyramid of Shadows is the final part of a loosely connected three-part series of adventures introducing the 4th edition Dungeons & Dragons ruleset. The adventure, written by Mike Mearls and James Wyatt, was published in 2008 by Wizards of the Coast, as a sequel to the adventures Keep on the Shadowfell and Thunderspire Labyrinth. The adventure is designed for characters of levels 7-10 and the module code "H" stands for Heroic Tier. This module is set in a region of the world called the Nentir Vale, the details of which are given in the 4th edition Dungeon Master's Guide.

== Synopsis ==
Pyramid of Shadows presents an adventure wherein players find their way to a multi-level extradimensional pyramid built by the gods as a prison for the power-mad Tiefling wizard Karavakos. Karavakos' power - and personality - has been fractured into multiple parts in order to keep him bound within the prison. In a plot to obtain his freedom, Karavakos tricks players into hunting down and killing several splinter versions of himself within the pyramid, in order that Karavakos might regain the power they hold and break free of the prison. However, with the aid of the undying head of Karavakos' one time Eladrin lover Vyrellis, the players gain the opportunity to breach Karavakos' sanctum and defeat the wizard, which dissolves the pyramid and frees the players.

== Format ==
Pyramid of Shadows is essentially a megadungeon, a single sprawling complex filled with monsters, traps and treasure. Because of the nature of the pyramid player characters cannot leave, return to a home base, or take up sidequests, so players will find themselves locked into the module until Karavakos is defeated and the pyramid is destroyed. The adventure is presented in two booklets. One booklet provides a general overview of the complex and introduces statistics for monsters that make their first 4th Edition appearance in this module. The second provides details of the module's tactical encounters, presented in the delve format where each encounter is depicted across two pages and contains all relevant maps and statblocks within that space.

== Contents ==
- A 32-page adventure booklet (Book 1)
- A 64-page adventure booklet (Book 2)
- A full-color poster map
- A light cardboard portfolio

== Publication history ==
The adventure was designed by Mike Mearls and James Wyatt and was published in August 2008. Cover art was by William O'Connor, with interior art by Ben Wootten, Attila Adorjany, Brian Hagan, and Lucio Parillo.
