= Ralph Horsley =

Artist

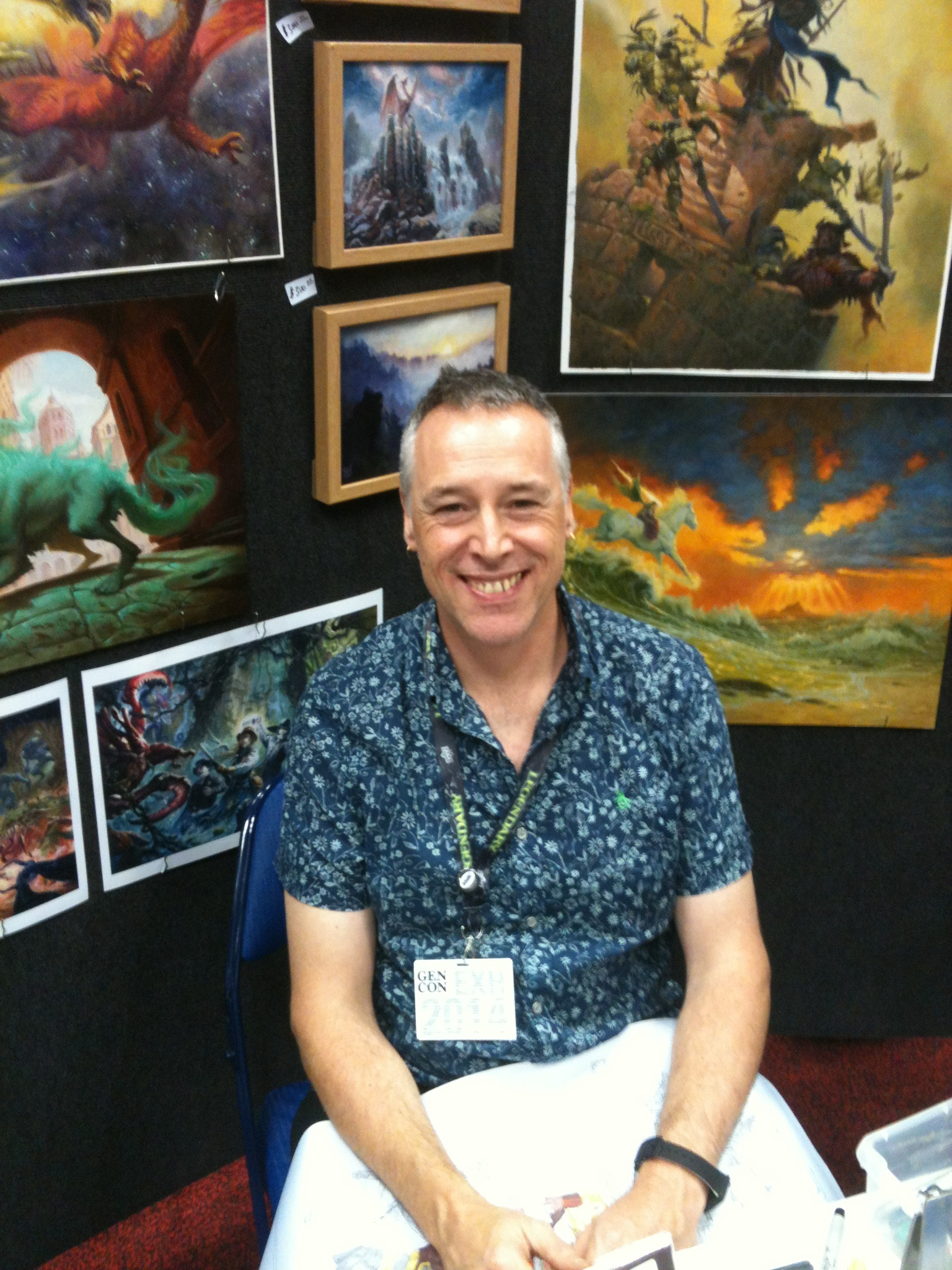
- Known for: Fantasy art
- Spouse: Anne Stokes (ex-wife)

Ralph Horsley is an artist whose work has appeared in role-playing games.

== Career ==
His Dungeons & Dragons work includes cover art for the adventure The Shattered Gates of Slaughtergarde (2006), and interior art for Monster Manual III (2004), Player's Handbook II (2006), Fiendish Codex I: Hordes of the Abyss (2006), Complete Psionic (2006), Complete Mage (2006), Cityscape (2006), The Shattered Gates of Slaughtergarde (2006), Dungeonscape (2007), Magic Item Compendium (2007), Monster Manual V (2007), Rules Compendium (2007), Elder Evils (2007), and the 4th edition Monster Manual (2008) and Manual of the Planes (2008).

He is known for his work on the Magic: The Gathering collectible card game. He has also contributed art to the World of Warcraft Trading Card Game and Hearthstone. In September 2026, it was announced that Horsley would have artwork in the newest set from Sorcery: Contested Realm, Frost Mage vs. Lavamancer, to be released in November 2026.

== Personal life ==
Horsley was married to artist Anne Stokes.
