= Thunderspire Labyrinth =

Dungeons & Dragons adventure module

- Code: H2
- Rules required: 4th Edition Dungeons & Dragons
- Character levels: 4-6
- Campaign setting: Points of Light
- Authors: Richard Baker, Mike Mearls
- First published: July 15, 2008
- ISBN: 978-0-7869-4872-7

Linked modules
- H1 H2 H3

Thunderspire Labyrinth is the second in the three-part series of adventures introducing the new 4th edition Dungeons & Dragons concept of Points of Light, a loosely connected and open-ended setting designed to allow modules and Dungeon Masters created materials to be seamlessly integrated into either a single, largely unmapped fantasy world or a Dungeon Master custom made setting. The adventure, written by Mike Mearls and Richard Baker was published in 2008 by Wizards of the Coast, as a sequel to the adventure Keep on the Shadowfell. The adventure is designed for character of levels 4-6 and the module code "H" stands for Heroic Tier. This module is set in a region of the world called the Nentir Vale, the details of which are given in the 4th edition Dungeon Master's Guide.

== Synopsis ==
Thunderspire Labyrinth can be run as either a loose sequel to Keep on the Shadowfell or as a standalone module.

Players find themselves journeying to Thunderspire, a mountain beneath which lies the abandoned subterranean minotaur city of Saruun Khel. The module suggests many goals for players in Saruun Khel, the largest of which is to investigate a slave ring run by a group called the Bloodreavers and rescue a group of civilians recently enslaved by this organisation. (This may be as a result of events in Keep on the Shadowfell or through other, unconnected, plot hooks.)

The players then proceed through a number of mini-dungeons; the Bloodreavers turn out to have sold the slaves to the duergar tribe known as Clan Grimmerzhul, who have then onsold a smaller subset of the slaves to a band of fiend-tainted gnolls. Finding and overcoming the gnolls reveals a sinister plan about to be enacted by a renegade wizard named Paldemar, who has designs on conquest of the Nentir Vale in which Thunderspire is located. Ultimately players confront and defeat Paldemar, which concludes the module.

== Monsters ==
Thunderspire Labyrinth contains the first 4th Edition appearances and write-ups of the duergar, along with bronze warders, norkers, phalagars, and Enigmas of Vecna.

== Contents ==
- A 32-page adventure book one booklet
- A 64-page adventure book two booklet
- A full-color poster map
- A light cardboard portfolio

== Publication history ==
The adventure was designed by Richard Baker and Mike Mearls and was published in July 2008. Cover art was by William O'Connor, with interior art by Ron Lemen, Lucio Parrillo, and Jim Pavelec.
