= Heart of Nightfang Spire =

Dungeons & Dragons adventure module

- Rules required: Dungeons & Dragons, 3rd edition
- Character levels: 10th
- Authors: Bruce R. Cordell
- First published: 2001

Linked modules
- The Sunless Citadel * The Forge of Fury * The Speaker in Dreams * The Standing Stone * Heart of Nightfang Spire * Deep Horizon * Lord of the Iron Fortress * Bastion of Broken Souls

Heart of Nightfang Spire is an adventure module for the 3rd edition of the Dungeons & Dragons fantasy role-playing game.

== Plot summary ==
In Heart of Nightfang Spire, the player characters are drawn to investigate Nightfang Spire, a lonely stone tower in a barren land. The vampire lord Gulthias, servant of the great dragon Ashardalon, has returned to the tower which was once the main cult temple of Ashardalon. The vampire prepares for the dragon's return by awakening the other cultists who had preserved themselves as undead creatures.

== Publication history ==
Heart of Nightfang Spire was published in 2001, and was written by Bruce R. Cordell, with cover art by Jeff Easley and interior art by Dennis Cramer.

== Reviews ==
- Backstab #34
