= Barrow of the Forgotten King =

Dungeons & Dragons adventure module

- Rules required: Dungeons & Dragons, 3.5 edition
- Character levels: 2nd
- Authors: Ed Stark
- First published: December 2006

Linked modules
- DD1: Barrow of the Forgotten King * DD2: The Sinister Spire * DD3: Fortress of the Yuan-Ti

Barrow of the Forgotten King is an adventure module for the 3.5 edition of the Dungeons & Dragons fantasy role-playing game.

== Plot summary ==
Barrow of the Forgotten King features wolves prowling the graveyard of Kingsholm, where something has disturbed the rest of those buried in the mausoleum. The player characters must explore the catacombs beneath the graves to discover what evils stirs in the depths.

== Publication history ==
Barrow of the Forgotten King was written by Ed Stark, and was published in February 2007. Cover art was by Steve Prescott, with interior art by Wayne England and Joel Thomas.

== Reception ==
TheGamer in 2022 ranked it as #9 on their list of "The Best 3.5 Edition Adventures".
