= Fantastic Locations: Fields of Ruin =

Dungeons & Dragons adventure module

- Rules required: Dungeons & Dragons, 3.5 edition
- Character levels: 8th
- Authors: Richard Pett
- First published: April 2006

Fantastic Locations: Fields of Ruin is an adventure module for the 3.5 edition of the Dungeons & Dragons fantasy role-playing game.

== Plot summary ==
In Fantastic Locations: Fields of Ruin, the player characters must follow the King's Road to the ruins of the Keep of Fallen Kings, in order to retrieve the fabled Earthcrown.

== Publication history ==
Fantastic Locations: Fields of Ruin was written by Richard Pett, and was published in April 2006. Cover art was by Francis Tsai, with interior art by Andrew Trabbold.
