= Orcs of Stonefang Pass =

Adventure for Dungeons & Dragons

- Code: Hero Series 2
- Rules required: Dungeons & Dragons, 4th edition
- Character levels: 5
- Campaign setting: Nentir Vale
- Authors: Logan Bonner
- First published: July 20, 2010
- ISBN: 978-0-7869-5391-2

Orcs of Stonefang Pass is an adventure for the 4th edition of the Dungeons & Dragons role-playing game.

== Summary ==
Orcs of Stonefang Pass is an adventure in which the player characters clear a pass in the mountains of Stonemarch, home to orcs tribes, so the town of Winterhaven can use the pass for trade with other lands.

== Publication history ==
Orcs of Stonefang Pass by Logan Bonner was published on July 20, 2010. It was the second book in the Hero Series and was designed to be a standalone adventure that could be inserted into any Dungeons & Dragons campaign. The cover was illustrated by Wayne England and the cartography was designed by Jason Engle. RPG Geek reported that while the book is part of the Hero Series "when Wizards of the Coast decided to go to print, they removed the series notation".

== Reception ==
Paco G. Jaen, for GMS Magazine, wrote "You will meet some interesting characters and they will give you good motivations to go into the adventure. The encounters are tough, but not impossible and they keep coming. There are a lot of encounters [...] and they’re all great fun. Lots of traps, lots of puzzles and lots of orcs and other creatures you’d expect to find in any good dungeon crawler, which is what this is".
