= The Shattered Gates of Slaughtergarde =

Dungeons & Dragons adventure module

- Rules required: D&D 3.5
- Character levels: 1st-6th
- Campaign setting: Generic Setting
- Authors: David Noonan
- First published: 2006

The Shattered Gates of Slaughtergarde is a generic setting adventure module for the 3.5 edition of the Dungeons & Dragons roleplaying game. The adventure is designed for 1st level characters. It contains a 32-page adventure.

== Plot summary ==
800 years ago, forces of the Abyss attempted to invade the Prime Material Plane, but were rebuffed by an army of celestials and mortals. However, remnants of the portals used to invade the Prime Material Plane remain, and forces are attempting to open them again. The players are presented with the choice of closing the gates (Good), giving the gates to a secretive cabal (Neutral), or opening the gates themselves (Evil) (based on alignment). The players can earn affiliation points with two fully stated factions, granting specific benefits not available elsewhere; and, with clever play, can manage to have affiliations to both factions.

== Publication history ==
The book was published in 2006, and was written by David Noonan, with cover art by Ralph Horsley and interior art by Brian Hagan and Ralph Horsley.
