= Keep on the Shadowfell =

Dungeons & Dragons adventure module

- Code: H1
- Rules required: 4th Edition Dungeons & Dragons
- Character levels: 1-3
- Campaign setting: Points of Light
- Authors: Bruce R. Cordell, Mike Mearls
- First published: 2008
- ISBN: 978-0-7869-4850-5

Linked modules
- H1 H2 H3

Keep on the Shadowfell is the first official product from the 4th edition Dungeons & Dragons ("D&D") line. It is part one of a three-part series of adventures. It introduces a series of 4th edition Dungeons & Dragons settings called the Points of Light, a loosely connected and open-ended series of settings designed to allow other modules and fan-created content to be integrated seamlessly into the settings' largely unmapped fantasy world or the Dungeon Master's own custom-made setting. The adventure, written by Mike Mearls and Bruce R. Cordell, was published in 2008 by Wizards of the Coast. It is followed by the sequels Thunderspire Labyrinth and Pyramid of Shadows. The adventure is designed for characters from levels 1 to 3. Its module code, "H", stands for Heroic Tier. This module is set in a region of the world called the Nentir Vale, which is described in greater detail in the 4th edition Dungeon Master's Guide.

== Contents ==
- 16-page 4th Edition quick-start rules booklet, including five ready-to-play characters
- 80-page adventure booklet
- 3 large size, double-sided, full-color battle maps
- 1 light cardboard portfolio

== Story ==
Kobold raiders are menacing the Nentir Vale village of Winterhaven. They attack the player characters who are also traveling to Winterhaven. When the player characters arrive at Winterhaven, they are asked to clean out the kobold nest. The player characters soon discover that the kobolds are pawns of Kalarel, a priest of Orcus, Demon Prince of Undeath. Kalarel has a lair at a nearby ruined keep that contains the Shadow Rift, once a gateway to the Shadowfell and is no longer in use. Kalarel plans to reopen the Shadow Rift to connect the material world to Orcus's temple in the Shadowfell. This unleashes an army of undead upon the unsuspecting region. The player characters journey to the keep and descend through its crypts, resulting in a final climactic confrontation with Kalarel.

== Publication history ==
The adventure was designed by Bruce R. Cordell and Mike Mearls and was first published in May 2008. William O'Connor created the cover art, and Miguel Coimbra and Eric Deschamps created the interior art.

Shannon Appelcline commented that "The fourth edition of Dungeons & Dragons was previewed in May of 2008 in a quick-start adventure, H1: Keep on the Shadowfell (2008), that introduced both the 4e rule system and the Points of Light setting."

Keep on the Shadowfell was the first 4th Edition D&D adventure module to be released. It was released before the core 4th Edition rulebooks were made available, and includes pre-generated characters and a condensed version of many game rules. For early adopters, Keep on the Shadowfell was the first opportunity to play an official D&D 4th Edition product.

In April 2009, Wizards of the Coast released an updated PDF version of Keep on the Shadowfell. This updated version fixed many typographical errors throughout the module, revised the presentation and formatting of many encounters, and re-tuned the difficulty of certain key sections by adding or subtracting monsters. This PDF was made available to the public free of charge through Wizards' D&D Test Drive program.

== Reception ==
A reviewer from the gaming-oriented Pyramid commented that, as the first scenario for the yet-unreleased new edition, Keep on the Shadowfell was "quite a significant item," particularly because Wizards had included rules from the new edition.

In a May 2008 review for RPG.net, David R. Henry rated the adventure's style as a 4 out of 5 ("Classy & Well Done"), and rated the adventure's substance as a 3 out of 5 ("Average"). He concluded that "as it is now it’s a very average adventure with little to recommend it (but, and this must be stressed, little to complain about either)."

== Reviews ==
- Coleção Dragon Slayer
- Coleção Dragon Slayer
