= Dungeon Tiles =

- Genre: Role-playing game
- Publisher: Wizards of the Coast
- Publication date: 2006 - 2008

The Dungeon Tiles series consists of seven sets of supplementary map grids for the 3.5 edition of the Dungeons & Dragons role-playing game.

== Contents ==
Each supplement in the Dungeon Tiles series contains six fully illustrated map grids that can be used by the Dungeons & Dragons gamemaster to both add atmosphere to a game of D&D, and save time otherwise spent on drawing maps for the players. The seven supplements in this series are:

- DT1 Dungeon Tiles (2006): rooms and passages of various sizes, plus doors, walls and other terrain features that can be used for D&D encounters.
- DT2 Arcane Corridors (2006): arcane chambers, corridors, and passages of various sizes, plus doors, magic circles and other terrain elements.
- DT3 Hidden Crypts (2007): rooms, corridors, and passages of various sizes, plus doors, walls and other terrain elements.
- DT4 Ruins of the Wild (2007): wilderness locales, ruins, rivers and other terrain elements.
- DT5 Lost Caverns of the Underdark (2007, designed by James Wyatt and illustrated by Jason Engle): subterranean locales, lava pits, underground rivers and other terrain elements.
- DT6 Dire Tombs (2007, designed by Bruce R. Cordell and Chris Perkins and illustrated by Jason Engle): tombs, temples, catacombs and other terrain elements.
- DT7 Fane of the Forgotten Gods (2008, designed by Bruce R. Cordell, Christopher Perkins, and James Wyatt, and illustrated by Jason Engle): temples, magical traps and other terrain elements.

== Reception ==
One reviewer from Pyramid wondered: "Why it took Wizards of the Coast so long to milk this cash cow (or, more accurately, milk it anew) isn't clear, but in a field that, in the last six months, has turned positively lousy with mapping accoutrements and programs from several companies, you have to be cautious enough to wonder if Dungeons & Dragons Dungeon Tiles is worth it." Another reviewer commented regarding Wizards of the Coast that "it's nice to see they've at least kept up one of their lines long enough to produce the promised next installment in their Dungeon Tiles line. Arcane Corridors offers a mystic bent in its selection." Another reviewer from Pyramid commented that "Quick-use maps continue to flood the RPG market, and thankfully Wizards of the Coast keeps up a regular supply of their quality tile sets. To coincide with their miniatures accessory The Unhallowed, the third set in the line is called Hidden Crypts."
