= King of the Trollhaunt Warrens =

Dungeons & Dragons module

- Code: P1
- Rules required: 4th Edition Dungeons & Dragons
- Character levels: 11-13
- Campaign setting: Points of Light
- Authors: Richard Baker, Logan Bonner
- First published: 2008
- ISBN: 978-0-7869-4928-1

Linked modules
- P1 P2 P3

King of the Trollhaunt Warrens is the first part of a three-part series of adventures belonging to the 4th edition Dungeons & Dragons concept of Points of Light, a loosely connected and open-ended setting designed to allow modules and Dungeon Masters created materials to be seamlessly integrated into either a single, largely unmapped fantasy world or a Dungeon Master custom made setting. The adventure, written by Richard Baker and Logan Bonner was published in 2008 by Wizards of the Coast. The adventure is designed for character of levels 11-13 and the module code "P" stands for Paragon Tier. This module is set in a region of the world called Trollhaunt and the town of Moonstar.

== Synopsis ==
Set in and around the fictional coastal town of Moonstair, King of the Trollhaunt Warrens sees players combatting the menace of Skalmad, a self-declared king of the trolls who can repeatedly return from death through use of a magical cauldron. Players journey to Skalmad's warren in the Trollhaunt, return to Moonstair to repel an attack by Skalmad's troll army, and finally travel to the faerie realm of the Feywild to destroy the cauldron.

== Contents ==
- A 32-page adventure book one booklet
- A 64-page adventure book two booklet
- A full-color poster map
- A light cardboard portfolio

== Publication history ==
The adventure was designed by Richard Baker and Logan Bonner, and was published in October 2008. Cover art was by Warren Mahy, with interior art by Warren Mahy, Jim Pavelec, Mike Schley, and Ben Wootten.

== Reception ==
King of the Trollhaunt Warrens received the silver ENnie Award for Best Adventure.
