= Dungeon Masters Screen =

Tabletop role-playing game supplement for Dungeons & Dragons

- 1st edition Dungeon Masters Screen
- Author: Various
- Genre: Role-playing game
- Publisher: TSR
- Publication date: 1979

Dungeon Masters Screen (later called Dungeon Master's Screen) is an accessory for the Dungeons & Dragons fantasy role-playing game.

== Publication history ==
=== Advanced Dungeons & Dragons ===
The 1979 Dungeon Masters Screen was the original dungeon master's screen for the first edition Advanced Dungeons & Dragons rules and came as a two-panel piece with a separate four-panel piece. It contained the most essential combat rules for easy reference.

The first Dungeon Masters Screen featured a cover by Dave Trampier and was published by TSR in 1979 as two cardboard screens; a second printing in the same year consisted of two cardstock screens, with an Erol Otus painting featuring a warrior fighting a dragon on the title panel.

The original screen was revised, repackaged, and retitled as REF1, Dungeon Master's Screen, designed by Bob Blake, and published by TSR in 1985 as two three-panel cardstock screens. The 1985 revision REF1 Dungeon Master's Screen contained revised charts and tables for combat. This one included a Dungeon Master's Screen, a Players' Screen, and a covering sheet that gives a summary of abilities for player characters by level and what each class has for prime requisites.

=== Advanced Dungeons & Dragons 2nd edition ===
A screen for the second edition AD&D rules was designed by Jean Rabe and Bruce Rabe, with a cover by Jeff Easley, and was published by TSR in 1989 as a cardstock screen with a 16-page booklet.

The 1989 second edition AD&D version of REF1 came with an adventure scenario called Terrible Trouble at Tragidore, which contained suggestions on how to improve as a more experienced DM. Its author was Teeuwynn Woodruff. The second edition's revised Dungeon Master Screen & Master Index contains two screens with a full list of tables intended to provide easy reference including: critical hits, lists of equipment and where the planes of existence are located. The two indices contained within the Master Index codify the rules and lists found in the seven core second edition books, detailing each rule, numerical modifier, magic item and spell in alphabetical order and cross-referenced with where they can be found in the books.

Another version, the Dungeon Master Screen & Master Index was published by TSR in 1995.

=== Dungeons & Dragons 3rd edition ===
A Dungeon Master Screen was published in 2000, developed and assembled by Dale Donovan and Kim Mohan, and featuring cover art by Jeff Easley. A Dungeon Master Screen was also published for the Forgotten Realms campaign, which included a booklet titled "Encounters in Faerûn" designed by Skip Williams and Duane Maxwell, and featuring cover art by Justin Sweet.

=== Dungeons & Dragons 4th edition ===
For D&D's 4th edition, there was a basic Dungeon Master's Screen published in August 2008. In February 2011, a revised Deluxe Dungeon Master's Screen was released, with heavier cardstock and newer artwork.

=== Dungeons & Dragons 5th edition ===
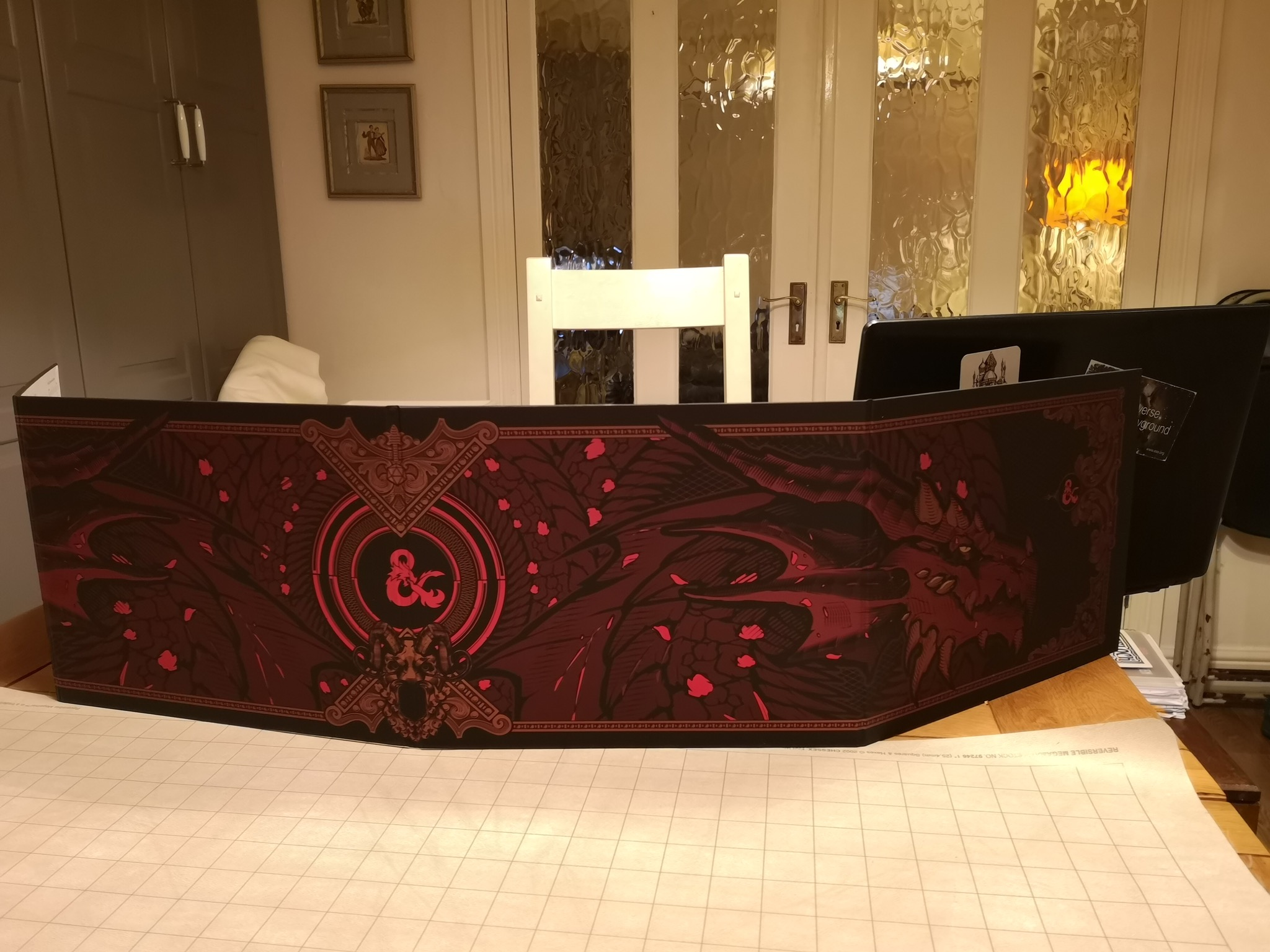
The 5th edition Dungeon Master's Screen from the core rule book gift set collector's edition by the artist Hydro74.

A Dungeon Master's Screen was released for the game's 5th edition in January 2015. A revised version, titled Dungeon Master's Screen Reincarnated featuring revised artwork and charts was released in September 2017. Additionally, campaign-specific screens produced under license by Game Force 9 have been released as tie-ins to the major adventure modules.

== Reception ==
The first edition version of the Dungeon Masters Screen was a Gamer's Choice award-winner.

The revised first edition REF1 screen was given a fairly balanced review by Jez Keen in Imagine magazine. Keene called the info sheet a useful memory aid but missed information on player character races and the types of weapons and armor available to each class. Keen called the Players' Screen "less useful", wondering what exactly the players have to screen. The Players' Screen contained standard tables on spells, weapons, and equipment, as well as the "to hit" tables and, according to Keen, allocates "an extraordinary amount of space" to grenade-like missiles. As for the DM Screen, Keen noted that the tables contain nothing surprising but since the reference tables in the Dungeon Master's Guide are much less useful than those in the Player's Handbook, the reviewer "has used them and will continue to do so".

Keith Eisenbeis reviewed the 2nd edition product in a 1993 issue of White Wolf. He praised the accompanying adventure, but was negative about the screen itself, stating "it is both plain and uninspiring", and noted that it did not make good use of space. He rated it overall at a 2 out of 5 possible points.

Trenton Webb reviewed the AD&D second edition Dungeon Master Screen & Master Index for Arcane magazine, rating it a 7 out of 10 overall. He felt that finding information on the screens "can prove a little tricky, since the screens were obviously laid out by Jackson Pollock". He called the indices "an exercise in clear and consise functionality" and that using the "effective notation system, it's easy to find anything" listed in the index, but cautioned that "you have to think in TSR terms and titles to find the entry". Webb summed up his review of the Dungeon Master Screen & Master Index by saying: "The index is essential stuff; the screens less so, since most DMs have evolved their own screen or alternative system for ready reference. But it's well worth £6 to be able to quickly find every rule you know you've read but forgotten previously where..."

In a retrospective review of Dungeon Masters Screen in Black Gate, Scott Taylor said "Those early years using the 1st Edition AD&D mechanics are the times I think screens mattered most. In that system you needed the screens for easy access to the elaborate 'to hit' charts and saving throws. It was the perfect place to house them, and I'm not sure if this was the initial design concept, but whatever the case it worked very well. Assuming this was their primary purpose then the secondary consequence of the screen was, and still is, the true genius behind it all, that being the ability to hide the dice from the prying eyes of the players."

Dungeons & Dragons Dungeon Masters Screen won the 2015 Gold Ennie Award for "Best Aid/Accessory".

== Reviews ==
- Magia i Miecz #25 (January 1996) (Polish)
