= Dungeons & Dragons Starter Set =

Role-playing game rule set

The Complete Starter Set: Advanced Dungeons & Dragons Game (1996)

The Dungeons & Dragons Starter Set is a category of companion accessories across multiple editions of the Dungeons & Dragons fantasy role-playing game. In general, the Starter Set is a boxed set that includes a set of instructions for basic play, a low level adventure module, pre-generated characters, and other tools to help new players get started.

== Advanced Dungeons & Dragons 2nd edition ==
During the 1990s, TSR, Inc. published three starter sets for Advanced Dungeons & Dragons. Shannon Appelcline noted that by 1993 the Basic D&D line ended and was replaced by games such as Dragon Quest (1992) and DragonStrike (1993), and that "There was another abrupt change the next year when TSR put out First Quest (1994) by Richard Baker, Zeb Cook, and Bruce Nesmith. It was an introductory AD&D game with an example of play on a CD; after two years of introductory board games, the company was now back to introductory roleplaying, though no longer under the Basic D&D brand".

- 1994: First Quest: The Introduction to Role-Playing Games
- 1995: This starter set was re-released with new artwork and re-titled as the Introduction to Advanced Dungeons & Dragons Game. The main difference in this new edition was that it included The Book of Lairs and did not include an audio CD.
- 1996: The Complete Starter Set: Advanced Dungeons & Dragons Game. Similar to the 1995 box, and with plastic figures and battle maps.

Wizards of the Coast bought TSR, Inc. in 1997 and in 1999 they put out two editions of the last starter set for the 2nd edition, the Dungeons & Dragons Adventure Game. Similar to the previous starter sets, it included a simplified ruleset up to the 3rd level, an adventure book, and a Dungeon Master's Screen. This set also included dice, a dice bag and pre-generated characters but did not include an audio CD.

== Dungeons & Dragons 3rd edition and v3.5 ==
In 2000, the 3rd Edition version of the Dungeons & Dragons Adventure Game was released. It included a 32-page rulebook, a 48-page adventure book, 32 pages of reference, a map, two pages of tokens and a "Read This First" sheet.

After the revision to 3rd Edition (known as v3.5) was published in 2003, three more starter sets were published. In 2004, the Dungeons & Dragons Basic Game was published as a simplified version of game in the form of a board game that was compatible with the full version of v3.5. It was known as the "Black Dragon Edition" due to the black dragon on its cover. Similar to the 3rd Edition starter set, this set included quick start rules, a full rulebook, and an adventure but it also included 16 painted plastic miniatures, double-sided map tiles, and a set of dice. Then in 2006, a new edition of the Dungeons & Dragons Basic Game was released. It was known as the "Blue Dragon Edition" due to the blue dragon on its cover. The characters, the content of the adventure, and the miniatures were almost entirely different from the 2004 edition.

In 2007, Wizards of the Coast published the Dungeons & Dragons Player's Kit. This starter set was advertised as a sequel to the Basic Game (2006). It included a booklet on how to create characters for new players, a trade paperback version of the Player’s Handbook, and a set of dice.

== Dungeons & Dragons 4th Edition ==
=== Dungeons & Dragons Roleplaying Game Starter Set (blue box cover) ===
Following the release of the new 4th Edition Player's Handbook, Monster Manual, and Dungeon Master's Guide in June 2008, the Dungeons & Dragons Roleplaying Game Starter Set was released on October 21, 2008. This box set included an introductory version of the 4th Edition rules (a 16-page Quick Start Rules booklet and a 64-page Dungeon Master's Book), dice, three sheets of double-sided map tiles, 50 tokens (to represent characters and monsters) and an adventure module called Beneath the Village of Harken. The 2008 Starter Set was referred to as the "Blue box" edition due to its cover. A PDF version of these Quick Start Rules was made available for free download.

=== Dungeons & Dragons Fantasy Roleplaying Game Starter Set (red box cover) ===
This new Starter Set was released on September 7, 2010. The box set included two booklets (a 32-page book for players and a 64-page book for Dungeon Masters), two sheets of die-cut tokens for characters and monsters, dice, and cardstock character sheets and power cards. It also included two adventures – one designed for solo-play and one designed for group play (called The Twisting Halls). The 2010 Starter Set was referred to as the "Red box" edition.

Shannon Appelcline noted that "Wizards' final major expansion of 2010, Essentials, was the biggest change for D&D since the 2008 release of the 4E rules. Intended to offer an easier entry point to 4E D&D, the line kicked off with the boxed Dungeons & Dragons Starter Set (2010) — whose cover looks almost exactly like Frank Mentzer's iteration of the Dungeons & Dragons Basic Rules (1983). Though the box only took players up to second level, additional Essentials products quickly supplemented it."

Greg Tito, for The Escapist, compared this starter set to older starter sets, specifically the 1977 and 1983 editions, and wrote that "the new 4th Edition Red Box has everything that you need to run and play a game of Dungeons & Dragons". John Baichtal, for Wired, also compared this starter set to the 1983 edition and wrote that "the new Dungeons & Dragons Starter Set is the most unique and engaging way to introduce someone to a roleplaying game I think I've ever seen. [...] Experienced players will find little of value in the set. However, if you or someone you know wants to dip their toe onto the vast and turbulent D&D swimming pool, this is the set you'll want".

== Dungeons & Dragons 5th Edition ==
=== Starter Set ===
Unlike the 4th Edition Starter Set (2008), the 5th Edition Starter Set was released on July 15, 2014, before the new core three rulebooks (Player's Handbook, Monster Manual, Dungeon Master's Guide) were released between August and December 2014. It included a 32-page rulebook for playing characters level 1–5, a 64-page adventure module (Lost Mine of Phandelver), five pre-generated characters and dice. Lost Mine of Phandelver is set in and around the village of Phandalin (a region in the Forgotten Realms).

The Starter Set won "Best Supplement" in the 2014 Golden Geek Awards. In the 2015 ENnie Awards, the Starter Set was the gold winner of "Best Production Values" and "Best Family Game". In a review of Dungeons & Dragons Starter Set in Black Gate, Andrew Zimmerman Jones said "it's not enough to give us a full idea of what the final rules for 5th edition will look like ... but it does provide enough information to get some hints about how the upcoming edition of the game will be structured. In general, the goal seems to be to streamline the system, making it very accessible to new gamers, but still providing enough substance and versatility that more experienced gamers will find the system desirable. It's a tough balancing act, but looking over the D&D Starter Set, I feel a growing sense of confidence that the new system will achieve these objectives."

Bloomberg reported that in 2014, the Starter Set in North America sold 126,870 units. While unit sales decreased in 2015, unit sales started to increase again in 2016. In 2018, 306,670 units were sold in North America. The Starter Set's adventure, Lost Mine of Phandelver, was available as a digital product through D&D Beyond, Fantasy Grounds, and Roll20 and is part of the 2023 adventure Phandelver and Below: The Shattered Obelisk.

=== Stranger Things Dungeons & Dragons Roleplaying Game Starter Set ===
Stranger Things Dungeons & Dragons Roleplaying Game Starter Set was released on May 1, 2019. This box set includes a Stranger Things themed adventure (Hunt for the Thessalhydra) that was seen in the first season of the Netflix show and pre-generated character sheets inspired by the D&D characters of the characters in the show. It also includes a set of dice and two exclusive miniatures of the Demogorgon (one painted and one unpainted). Tabletop Gaming reported that "the box itself is modelled on the RPG’s iconic ‘Red Box’ released in the early 1980s, and comes with the impression of hours of love in the form of readymade scuffs, creases and tears".

A new boxed set, titled Stranger Things: Welcome to the Hellfire Club, is scheduled for release in October 2025. It will feature four adventure modules with each module corresponding to a single season of Stranger Things along with five pre-generated character sheets "across three levels of play", tokens for characters and monsters, cards for magic items, monsters, and spells, and various handouts.

=== Dungeons & Dragons Essentials Kit ===
In May 2019, the Dungeons & Dragons Essentials Kit was announced during D&D Live 2019: The Descent on a Twitch live stream by Wizards of the Coast and was released on September 3, 2019. It contains a 64-page rulebook with new rules on creating characters, a new adventure titled Dragon of Icespire Peak, dice, character sheets, and 81 cards describing game mechanics.

The Essentials Kit also includes a code that unlocks the Essentials Kit Bundle on D&D Beyond at no extra cost. This bundle consists of the included Dragon of Icespire Peak adventure (level 1–6), as well as 3 digital-only supplementary adventures written by Wizards of the Coast: Storm Lord's Wrath (level 7–9), Sleeping Dragon’s Wake (level 9–11), and Divine Contention (level 11–13). The product also includes a 50% off code for the Player's Handbook (2014) on D&D Beyond. Brandin Tyrrel, for IGN, reported that the adventure location is the same as the first 5th Edition Starter Set; as a result, "both adventures can be played together".

Cameron Kunzelman, for Paste, wrote "if you’re getting your feet wet with D&D in 2019, then this is where you’d want to do that". Charlie Hall, for Polygon, wrote that the "retail product itself provides an excellent value". He highlighted the adventure's "diversity of environments and enemies on offer" and the "dynamic addition" of new two player sidekick rules. Hall was disappointed in the quality level of the cardboard components where he thought the DM screen was "flimsy" and the cards "a bit sloppy. Once separated from their sheets, the edges are rough and uneven. They’ve even too big to sleeve, and need to be trimmed down to fit".

=== Dungeons & Dragons vs. Rick and Morty ===
Dungeons & Dragons vs. Rick and Morty was released on November 19, 2019. This box set includes a Rick and Morty themed adventure (The Lost Dungeon Of Rickedness: Big Rick Energy), a rulebook, five pre-generated character sheets inspired by characters in the show, a specially designed DM screen, and a set of dice.

Jon Ryan, for IGN, wrote "it's clear that the team behind this crossover is incredibly invested in striking a great balance between paying homage to and reverently adapting the source material while also making the adventure accessible to new players (after all, isn’t it likely that left to his own devices Rick would just constantly kill all the characters he found boring?). The adventure booklet, in particular, will be a fun read for any DMs who are fans of the series, as it doesn’t just feature commentary from 'Rick' over the standard rule text (as in the rulebook), but rather, almost every room description, stat block, and random table are written from his perspective".

=== Starter Set: Dragons of Stormwreck Isle ===
In April 2022, the Starter Set: Dragons of Stomwreck Isle was announced at the D&D Direct livestream event; it was released on July 31, 2022. This starter set includes five pre-generated character sheets, an introductory rulebook, an adventure module and dice. It also includes digital tools and short onboarding videos which explain the fundamentals of Dungeons & Dragons.

=== Starter Set: Heroes of the Borderlands ===
As part of the 2024 revision to the 5th Edition ruleset, a new starter set titled Heroes of the Borderlands was released in September 2025. It is inspired by the original The Keep on the Borderlands adventure and includes three adventure booklets: Keep on the Borderlands, Caves of Chaos, and the Wilderness. It also includes dice, eighteen maps, a combat tracker, "over 200 game cards that detail backgrounds, species, spells, equipment, magic items, monsters, NPCs", and "over 200 tokens".

== See also ==
- Editions of Dungeons & Dragons
