= Dungeons & Dragons gameplay =

Game mechanics of the Dungeons & Dragons role-playing game

In the Dungeons & Dragons role-playing game, game mechanics and dice rolls determine much of what happens. These mechanics include:

- Ability scores, the most basic statistics of a character, which influence all other statistics
- Armor class, how well-protected a character is against physical attack
- Hit points, how much punishment a character can take before falling unconscious or dying
- Saving throws, a character's defenses against nonphysical or area attacks (like poisons, fireballs, and enchantments)
- Attack rolls and damage rolls, how effectively a character can score hits against, and inflict damage on, another character
- Skills, how competent a character is in various areas of expertise
- Feats, what special advantages a character has through natural aptitude or training

== Ability scores ==
All player characters have six basic statistics:

- Strength (STR): Strength is a measure of muscle, endurance and stamina combined; a high strength score indicates superiority in all these attributes. Strength affects the ability of characters to lift and carry weights, melee attack rolls, damage rolls (for both melee and ranged weapons), certain physical skills, several combat actions, and general checks involving moving or breaking objects.
- Dexterity (DEX): Dexterity encompasses a number of physical attributes including hand-eye coordination, agility, reflexes, fine motor skills, balance and speed of movement; a high dexterity score indicates superiority in all these attributes. Dexterity affects characters with regard to initiative in combat, ranged attack rolls, armor class, saving throws, and other physical skills. Dexterity is the ability most influenced by outside influences (such as armor).
- Constitution (CON): Constitution is a term which encompasses the character's physique, toughness, health and resistance to disease and poison; a high constitution score indicates superiority in all these attributes. The higher a character's constitution, the more hit points that character will have. Constitution also is important for saving throws, and fatigue-based general checks. Unlike the other ability scores, which render the character unconscious or immobile when they hit 0, having 0 Constitution is fatal.
- Intelligence (INT): Intelligence is similar to IQ, but also includes mnemonic ability, reasoning and learning ability outside those measured by the written word; a high intelligence score indicates superiority in all these attributes. Intelligence dictates the number of languages a character can learn, and it influences the number of spells a preparation-based arcane spell-caster (like a Wizard) may cast per day, and the effectiveness of said spells. It also affects certain mental skills.
- Wisdom (WIS): Wisdom is a composite term for the character's enlightenment, judgment, wile, willpower and intuitiveness; a high wisdom score indicates superiority in all these attributes. Wisdom influences the number of spells a divine spell-caster (such as clerics, druids, paladins, and rangers) can cast per day, and the effectiveness of said spells. It also affects saving throws and linked skills.
- Charisma (CHA): Charisma is the measure of the character's combined physical attractiveness, persuasiveness, and personal magnetism; a high charisma score indicates superiority in all these attributes. A generally non-beautiful character can have a very high charisma due to strong measures of the other two aspects of charisma. Charisma influences how many spells spontaneous arcane spell-casters (such as sorcerers and bards) can cast per day, and the effectiveness of said spells.

An ability score is a natural number, with a value of 10 or 11 representing average ability. "These ability scores help determine whether [a] character succeeds or fails at something they try" when a player rolls a d20. For example, "a Dwarf with 15 strength can probably lift up a huge rock quite easily. A wizard with 6 wisdom probably won't realize when they're getting conned. A bookish monk with 20 intelligence but just 4 constitution [...], would intuitively know the perfect regimen for training for a marathon, but couldn't even come close [to] completing one".

=== Ability modifiers ===
Beginning with the 3rd Edition, each score has a corresponding ability modifier, where Modifier = (Score − 10)/2, rounded down. It acts as a bonus or penalty depending on a character's ability scores. This modifier is added to the appropriate dice rolls. For example, the strength modifier would be added to the damage dealt by a sword, the dexterity modifier to Armor Class (see below) as the character's ability to dodge attacks, and the charisma modifier to an attempt to smooth-talk a merchant.

=== Determining ability scores ===
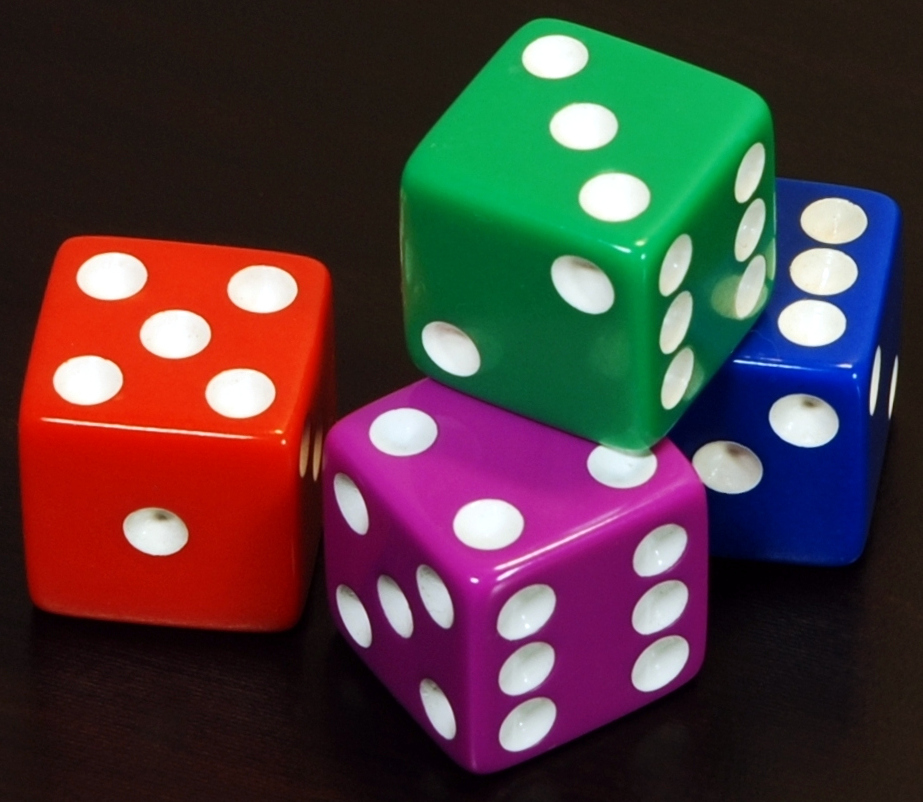
6-sided dice

In AD&D, ability scores were "determined by rolling three 6-sided dice and adding up their values". This had a significant impact on character creations as "certain classes could only be taken up by characters with the right combination of statistics. As a result, players often" re-rolled characters until they ended up with the combination of ability scores they desired. The point buy system was originally added as an optional ruleset in the second edition supplement Player's Option: Skills & Powers (1995) and while it is "largely incompatible with most of the other books released for AD&D second edition" it still "proved very popular among fans". "A point system to ensure total player control over the character's attributes while at the same time limiting just how powerful the character could become [...] [was] formalized in the third edition".

There are now several methods of determining a character's initial ability scores during character creation:

- Rolling dice (3d6): This is the standard method for older editions. For each ability score, the player rolls 3d6, and adds the values, resulting in scores ranging from three to eighteen, averaging 10.5.
- Rolling dice (4d6, keep 3): This is the standard method since 3rd edition. For each ability score, the player rolls 4d6, and adds the three highest values, resulting in scores ranging from three to eighteen, skewed towards higher numbers, averaging 12.24, though the most probable result is 13.
- Predetermined array of scores: Each player uses the same set of numbers, choosing which ability score to apply them to.
- Point buy: In the point buy system, a player has a certain number of points to spend on ability scores, and each score has a certain point cost affixed to it, where higher scores cost more points than lower ones.

=== Optional ability scores ===
- Comeliness (COM): In the first edition of AD&D, comeliness was introduced as a seventh ability score in the supplemental rulebook Unearthed Arcana and Oriental Adventures to differentiate between physical attractiveness and charisma. Comeliness has not appeared as an officially supported ability score since, although the second edition supplement Player's Option: Skills & Powers (1995) included optional rules for splitting each ability score into two sub-scores with "appearance" as a "subability" score of Charisma.
- Sanity (SAN): This ability score was introduced by the Call of Cthulhu role-playing game in 1981, but it was not officially introduced into the core D&D rules until the 5th Edition Dungeon Master's Guide (DMG, 2014) as an optional score for campaigns shaped by the constant risk of insanity. It is checked for actions "around entities of an utterly alien and unspeakable nature" and used with the Madness ruleset. The 5th Edition campaign guide Van Richten's Guide to Ravenloft (2021) added new "Fear and Stress" rules as a replacement for the "Madness and Sanity" rules suggested in the DMG. Christian Hoffer, for ComicBook.com, called the previous Madness ruleset "dated" and highlighted that "the 'Stress' mechanic is a more straightforward alternative to the 'Madness" mechanic' [...] With this new ruleset, each player has a Stress Score that increases in trying situations and decreases when players take steps to mentally fortify themselves with care or support. [...] When a player has a Stress Score, they subtract that score whenever they make an attack roll, ability check, or saving throw".
- Honor (HON): An optional score included in sourcebooks such as the first edition Oriental Adventures and the 5th Edition DMG. Honor determines how well the character adheres to the respective society's code, how well they understands its tenets, and it may also reflect others' perception of the character's honorability. Mechanically, it is used in social interaction in situations in which it may be more relevant than a person's charisma or in a saving throw. Unlike the regular six ability scores, Honor cannot be raised by the player after character creation. Instead, the dungeon master can increase or decrease its value at the end of an adventure according to the player character's actions throughout it. The 5th Edition DMG suggests using honor in campaigns with "cultures where a rigid code of honor is part of daily life"; the DMG also suggests using this score in settings "inspired by Asian cultures, such as Kara-Tur". Aaron Trammell, in the academic journal Analog Game Studies, wrote that "unlike honor for a paladin in a traditional Dungeons & Dragons campaign, Honor in this context has been detached from the ethical matrix of alignment. Honorable characters in Oriental Adventures can be evil, and dishonorable characters in Oriental Adventures can be good. [...] Honor is a paradigm case of Orientalism in Dungeons & Dragons, as it explicitly compares an imagined Oriental ethic and the West".

== Combat ==
=== Armor class ===
Armor class (AC) is a rating used to determine how difficult it is to damage a creature/character. It is based on several factors such as a creature's natural aversion to physical injury, magical enhancements, and any protective garments worn. The dexterity ability score grants bonuses to AC.

- In the original game, armor class ranged from 9 to 0, because armor and dexterity modifiers were applied to hit rolls instead. Negative values first appeared in the Greyhawk supplement, because it first applied them directly to the Armor Class.
- In editions prior to 3rd, armor class ranges from -10 to 10. Having an AC of 10 was the weakest, and a -10 being the strongest possible written AC.
- In subsequent editions, armor class instead starts at 10 and increases. Extremely non-dexterous or non-moving creatures may suffer penalties that lower their armor class below 10.

==== Defenses ====
In 4th edition, there are three defenses that function similarly to armor class. Fortitude is based on strength or constitution; it represents a character's endurance to pain. Reflex is based on dexterity or intelligence and can be modified by a shield; it represents a character's ability to dodge. Will is based on wisdom or charisma; it represents a character's strength of mind and resistance to mental attack. These defenses are typically lower than AC, so an attack against fortitude is usually better than an attack against AC.

=== Hit points ===
Hit points (HP) are a measure of a character's vitality or health; they are determined by the character's class or race, and Constitution score. Hit points are reduced whenever a character takes damage.

In the original D&D game a character died when his/her hit point total reached 0. First edition AD&D introduced an optional rule in which a character died when his/her hit points reached -10, with beings falling unconscious at 0 HP, and creatures reduced to negative HPs continue to lose HPs due to bleeding, etc. unless they are stabilized by aid or healing (natural or magical). In third edition, this rule became part of the core rules.

In 4th Edition, death occurs when a character's hit point value is reduced to half their total expressed as a negative number. For example, if a character has hit points of 52, the character is unconscious and dying at 0 hit points and death occurs when the character's hit points reach -26.

In 5th Edition, a character is killed automatically if the damage is greater than the negative value of their maximum hit points. Otherwise, a player at 0 hit points must begin making "death saving throws", where an unmodified d20 roll resulting in 10 or above is a success, below 10 a failure. If the player gets three failures before three successes, the character is dead. If three successes are recorded, the character is stable but unconscious. A result of 1 counts as two failures, while a result of 20 is automatic success and the character regains 1 hit point. A fellow player may attempt to stabilize their companion using a medicine skill check, or use more advanced healing options.

=== Saving throws ===
Certain situations give characters the chance to avoid special types of danger or attacks. These chances are called saving throws or saves. A saving throw is made when a character would come to harm from extraordinary means such as poisons and magical compulsions in nature.

In the early editions of D&D, there are five categories of saving throws, based on the form of the potential damage:

- Paralysis, Poison, or Death Magic
- Petrification or Polymorph
- Rods, Staves, Wands – against magical devices
- Spells
- Hexes
- Breath Weapons – such as with dragons or gorgons

In 3rd Edition, they were reduced to three kinds of saving throw based on what aspect of the character was under threat.

- Fortitude – A Fortitude save represents physical toughness. Fortitude saves involve a character's resistance to an effect that directly attacks his health, stamina, or soul. Fortitude saves are affected by the constitution ability score.
- Reflex – A Reflex save represents physical agility. Reflex saves are affected by the dexterity ability score.
- Will – A Will saves involve a character's mental resistance to mental dominance, confusion, stress, and insanity. Will saves are affected by the wisdom ability score.

In 4th Edition there is only one type of saving throw. Saving throws are usually rolled after a character has already been affected by an attack (by hitting the character's AC or fortitude, reflex, or will defense, defenses which the 3rd Edition saves had been converted into), rolled each round to give the character a chance to shake off the effect. They are meant partly to simplify record-keeping for effects that last more than one round but less than the encounter.

In 5th Edition, saving throws are explicitly tied to the ability scores, and carry their names, resulting in six categories of saves. A saving throw is performed similarly to a skill check, with a d20 roll result added to the relevant ability modifier and, if applicable, the proficiency bonus.

=== Attacking ===
When a character makes an attack, a 20-sided die is rolled to determine success/failure. The result could be adjusted based on any number of possible modifiers the character or its intended target have.

The number added to the die roll is actually several different modifiers combined, coming from different places. These modifiers include the character's proficiency with the specific weapon and weapons in general, the quality of the weapon (masterwork craftsmanship or magical enhancements), the modifier of the ability associated with the weapon (strength for melee weapons, and dexterity for ranged weapons), magical effects improving/hampering the character's ability to attack, and any special experience the character has fighting a certain foe.

- In the early editions, the final result is compared to a table along with the target's armor class to see if the attack hits. Every general class type had its own matrix-style table, while monsters used the same matrix as the generic fighter character type.
- In AD&D 2nd Edition, if the final result equals or exceeds the attacker's THAC0 (the pre-recorded number the character needs To Hit Armor Class 0), the attacker has successfully hit a target with armor class 0. If the target has an armor class different from zero (which is far more likely than not), the target's armor class is subtracted from the attacker's THAC0, and that number is what the attacker's roll must equal or exceed to see if the attack hits. This method was informally introduced before the publication of 2nd Edition as a shortcut for players to use.
- Since 3rd Edition, the attack hits simply if the final result is equal to or greater than the target's armor class.

=== Actions ===
The combat mechanic is turn-based and operates in rounds. A round is a discrete time interval (approximately 6 seconds, game-time in later editions, and approximately 1 minute in earlier editions) in which all involved parties act in the combat. The order in which parties involved in the combat act is determined by Initiative.

- In older editions, characters are allowed to move their speed and attack every round, or perform a reasonable combination of other actions.
- In 3rd and 3.5 editions, what a character can and cannot do in a given round is more codified; a character may perform one standard and one move action, two move actions or one full-round action in a round, along with any number of free actions, and a single swift or immediate action. Unlike other types of actions, immediate actions may also be taken during someone else's turn, though that counts as using the immediate action slot for the character's following turn.
- In 4th edition, a character is allotted one standard action, one move action, one minor action, and any number of free actions to be performed during his or her turn. Each action can be downgraded, such as replacing a standard action with a move action or a move action with a minor action. In addition, a character may take one opportunity action during each other character's turn, and one immediate action during any round, defined as the time between the end of the character's turn and the beginning of his next turn. Immediate and opportunity actions each have a defined trigger that allows their use, based on other characters' actions, and are categorized as reactions that are resolved after the trigger or as interrupts that are resolved before or in place of the triggering event. Neither immediate nor opportunity actions may be taken during the character's turn.
- In 5th edition, a character may move up to their full allowed distance and take an action each turn, in any combination the player chooses. Some class features, spells and other circumstances allow a bonus action as well. Reactions triggered by outside factors, such as opportunity attacks, may occur on a player's turn or someone else's.

== Experience ==
As the game is played, each PC changes over time and generally increases in capability. Characters gain (or sometimes lose) experience, skills and wealth, and may even alter their alignment or gain additional character classes. The key way characters progress is by earning experience points (XP), which happens when they defeat an enemy or accomplish a difficult task. Acquiring enough XP allows a PC to advance a level, which grants the character improved class features, abilities and skills. XP can be lost in some circumstances, such as encounters with creatures that drain life energy, or by use of certain magical powers that come with an XP cost.

== Skills ==
Dungeons & Dragons, starting with AD&D 1st Edition and continuing to the current 5th Edition, has many skills that characters may train in.

- In 1st and 2nd editions, these were broken down into "weapon proficiencies" and "non-weapon proficiencies".
- In 3rd Edition they are all simply referred to as "skills". Characters gain skill points for buying skill ranks based on class, level, and intelligence. Some skills can only be taken by certain classes, such as Read Lips or Animal Empathy. These skills are called exclusive skills. Others can be used even if the character has no ranks in that skill (i.e., is not trained in that skill).
- For 4th edition, the list of skills was drastically reduced. This usually resulted in each skill covering a broader range of activities, though some skills were removed entirely, such as profession and craft. The skill rank system was also removed, each skill being instead trained or untrained, with a constant bonus given to any trained skill along with a bonus based on the character's level. A character begins with a number of trained skills based on and chosen according to his class. The character gains new skill training only through spending a feat for that purpose, though these may be chosen regardless of class.
- In 5th Edition, the skills are more tightly tied to the ability scores, with each skill being seen as an area of specialization within the ability. Any skill check may be attempted by any character, but only characters that have proficiency in the specific skill area apply their proficiency bonus (a flat bonus tied to character level) to those particular skill checks. Characters gain proficiencies from their race, class, and character background, with additional proficiencies added by some feats.

A skill check is always a d20 roll, with bonuses added. Sometimes, a skill check may be aided by favorable circumstances (such as you brandishing a weapon while using Intimidate) or hampered by unfavorable circumstances (such as using improvised tools to pick a lock). A skill check is successful when the roll is higher than or equal to the difficulty class (DC) of the task. Usually, the Dungeon Master sets the DC. Sometimes the DC is set by the result of something else's check, this is an "opposed check". An example of an opposed check is spot against stealth: the character is trying to see something else that is trying not to be seen.

== Feats ==
Feats were introduced in 3rd edition of Dungeons & Dragons. A feat is an advantage, often some special option for the character (such as a special combat maneuver) or some modification to game options and the mechanics involved. Feats can be contrasted with skills, which were also introduced in the same edition, in that using a feat does not usually require the particular success/fail roll that skills do. Instead of possessing a certain rank at a skill, a character either possesses a feat or does not. Many feats require certain prerequisites (such as related feats or minimum ability scores) in order to select that feat.

The 4th Edition feat system is similar to the system in 3rd, with each feat having any number of prerequisites and some beneficial effect. Feats are also categorized by type, though "general" feats lack a category. "Class" and "Racial" feats require the character to be the indicated class or race. The "Heroic", "Paragon", and "Epic" descriptors indicate that the character must be in that tier or higher in order to choose the feat. "Divinity" feats grant a character with the "Channel Divinity" power an additional, alternative use for that power.

In 5th Edition, feats are made an optional character customization feature. As characters advance, at certain levels players increase their characters' ability scores. If playing with feats, they may forgo the ability score increases to take feats, which are structured as a package of thematically related improvements, some of which have prerequisites.

== Special abilities ==
Creatures and player characters may have additional abilities, usually based on their species. These include extraordinary senses - "low-light vision, darkvision, or" a "blind-sight" based on a sense for vibrations, smell, or echolocation - and "environmental adaptation: enhanced resistance, or even acclimatized immunity, to energy forms such as cold or fire."
