= Adventure (Dungeons & Dragons) =

Tabletop role-playing game story and setting materials

T1 Dungeon Module Cover, an example of an early Adventure for Dungeons & Dragons published by TSR

In the Dungeons & Dragons role-playing game, an adventure or module is a guide for managing player knowledge and activities within a specific scenario. Commercially, a published adventure comes as a pre-packaged book or box set that is used exclusively by the Dungeon Master. It typically contains background information for the plot or story, maps, vignettes of interesting locations, site inventories, creature descriptions and statistics, player visual aids, and suggested rules for evaluating events and likely player actions.

The term adventure is currently used by the game's publisher Wizards of the Coast. In early editions of the game these publications were commonly referred to as modules, which stems from the term dungeon module, used to refer to the earliest adventures published by TSR, with other variations on the module name appearing on latter adventures. The term module continued to be popular among players of the original Dungeons & Dragons and Advanced Dungeons & Dragons even after newer publications were labeled adventure. Adventures that appear as a part of a larger accessory are often referred to as scenarios.

The exact differences between the terms adventure, module, scenario, and accessory are hard to precisely define in Dungeons & Dragons terminology, as they all have been used in different ways.

== History of official modules and adventures ==
The first published Dungeons & Dragons scenario was "Temple of the Frog", included in 1975's Blackmoor Dungeons & Dragons rules supplement. This scenario was later developed into the stand-alone module DA2 – Temple of the Frog for the D&D Expert set rules (TSR, 1986).

The first stand-alone Dungeons & Dragons adventure module, Palace of the Vampire Queen, was published in 1976 by Wee Warriors. Although TSR did not produce this module, the company did distribute the first three printings on behalf of Wee Warriors. The adventure was described as a "Dungeon Masters Kit" rather than a "module" or an "adventure".

Also in 1976, the adventure Lost Caverns of Tsojconth was distributed by Metro Detroit Gamers as the tournament module for the gaming convention Wintercon V, but was not published for general distribution at the time. The adventure was later re-written for the first edition Advanced Dungeons & Dragons rules and published as module S4 – The Lost Caverns of Tsojcanth (TSR, 1982).

Additional unpublished adventures were distributed at gaming conventions during this period, including Steading of the Hill Giant Chief, used as a tournament module for Origins '78. Later in 1978, Steading of the Hill Giant Chief became the first stand-alone Dungeons & Dragons module actually produced and published by TSR. TSR Hobbies published a series of six adventures in 1978 that had been used previously only in tournaments. The company initiated its practice of assigning a code to each module published at the time, assigning the "G1" code to Steading of the Hill Giant Chief. TSR's practice of coding modules into various series would continue into the 1990s.

== Contents of adventures ==
The standard adventure is essentially an adventure kit including a backstory, maps and one or more objectives for the players to fulfill. Some include numerous illustrations. A Dungeon Master could purchase these pre-made adventures and use it or parts of it for a gaming session. The early format was a single booklet inserted, but not fixed, in a cardboard cover. As time went by the format and information included in module increased in variety. Dark Sun modules, for example, contained top-spiralbound notebooks. Eventually, the line blurred somewhat between what was an accessory or supplement and a module.

Modules had a suggested character level, often displayed prominently on the cover, and from the late 1980s prominently display the logo of the campaign setting they were set in. Some modules were reprints or revisions of modules used at gaming conventions before being published. All early modules are now out of print, though some have been reprinted in revised form. As such, many early modules are now highly sought-out collector items, particularly the earliest printings.

== Module codes ==
Except for a few early limited edition modules, all Dungeons & Dragons modules until late 1994 were denoted with an alphanumeric code consisting of a letter and a number. The letter codes related to the product in some way, with the number indicating the order of release for the product in the series. Modules within a letter set were usually somehow related, either thematically or as a series of linked adventures. For example, Z1 may be a prologue to Z2. Or Z1, Z2 and Z3 may have the adventurers fighting a similar enemy such as beholders. Though related, most modules were stand-alone and could be played without playing any of the other related modules.

TSR also used the module coding system on modules for several of non-Dungeons & Dragons roleplaying games including modules for (Advanced) Marvel Super-Heroes and the Conan Role-Playing Game. The module code was de-emphasised in the late 1980s, which also saw the campaign setting logo become a main feature of the cover. The code was dropped altogether by the end of 1993. In 2008, the adventure code was reintroduced with the release of the 4th edition Dungeons & Dragons adventure: H1 Keep on the Shadowfell.

== See also ==
- List of Dungeons & Dragons modules – for adventure modules until the publication of 3rd Edition D&D
- List of Dungeons & Dragons adventures – for all adventure modules after the publication of 3rd Edition D&D
