= Half-orc =

Fictional Dungeons & Dragons race

- Dungeons & Dragons race
- First appearance: Player's Handbook (1978)
- Last appearance: Player's Handbook (2014)

In-universe information
- Type: Humanoid
- Alignment: Any

The half-orc is a fictional humanoid race of orc and human lineage in the Dungeons & Dragons (D&D) role-playing game. In many editions of the game, it is one of the primary races available for player characters. Half-orcs are typically born in wild frontiers where human and orc tribes come into contact. Half-orcs are described as less bulky and more agile than pure-bred orcs, but still taller and stronger than most humans. Half-orcs have pale green skin, jutting jaws, prominent teeth and coarse body-hair.

== Overview ==
The orc was one of the earliest creatures introduced in the Dungeons & Dragons (D&D) game. The D&D orc is largely based upon the orcs appearing in the works of J. R. R. Tolkien. Tolkien's work also references the idea of half-orcs. In Tolkien's Middle-earth, the half-orcs were the creation of the wizard Saruman and bore several similarities to Sauron's Uruk-hai but were taller and appeared more man-like. In D&D, early versions of the game introduced the "half-orc" as a character race.

Half-orcs have been a part of D&D since the first edition of Advanced Dungeons & Dragons. However, in second edition the half-orc was no longer a standard player character race, and half-orcs were largely removed from the basic rules. With Wizards of the Coast's takeover of D&D and the release of 3rd Edition, half-orcs were reintroduced into the series. Half-orcs were not initially included as a player option in 4th Edition but became an option later in the edition. Half-orcs returned as a standard player option in 5th Edition, however, they were not included as an option in the 2024 revision to the 5th Edition ruleset.

== Publication history ==
=== Advanced Dungeons & Dragons 1st edition ===
The half-orc was introduced in the first edition Player's Handbook (1978) as a player character race. A number of half-orc varieties appeared in Dragon #44 (December 1980), including the orc-bugbear, the orc-gnoll, the orc-goblin, the orc-hobgoblin, the orc-kobold, and the orc-ogre.

The mythology and attitudes of the half-orc are described in detail in Dragon #62 (June 1982), in Roger E. Moore's article, "The Half-Orc Point of View."

=== Advanced Dungeons & Dragons 2nd edition ===
The half-orc appears first in the Monstrous Compendium Volume One (1989), and is reprinted in the Monstrous Manual (1993).

The half-orc is detailed as a playable character race in The Complete Book of Humanoids (1993). The half-orc is later presented as a playable character race again in Player's Option: Skills & Powers (1995).

The half-orc appears as a player character race for the Greyhawk campaign setting in the Player's Guide to Greyhawk (1998).

=== Dungeons & Dragons 3rd edition ===
The half-orc appears in the Player's Handbook for this edition as a player character race (2000). The half-orc also appears in the Monster Manual for this edition (2000).

The half-orc is presented as a player character race for the Forgotten Realms setting in the Forgotten Realms Campaign Setting (2001), and also appears in Races of Faerûn (2003).

=== Dungeons & Dragons 3.5 edition ===
The half-orc appears in the revised Player's Handbook as a player character race (2003). The half-orc appears in the revised Monster Manual for this edition (2003).

The gheden half-orc appears in Dragon #313 (November 2003).

The aquatic half-orc, the arctic half-orc, the desert half-orc, the jungle half-orc, the half-orc paragon, and the water half-orc were all introduced in Unearthed Arcana (2004). The scabland half-orc was introduced in Sandstorm: Mastering the Perils of Fire and Sand (2005). The half-orc infiltrator appears in the Monster Manual IV (2006). The frostblood half-orcs appear in Dragon Magic (2006).

=== Dungeons & Dragons 4th edition ===
Neither the half-orc nor the gnome were included as player options in the 4th edition Player's Handbook (2008), which historian Shannon Appelcline described as "the most notable omissions from the race list". Appelcline wrote that "the half-orc was missing because the design team was concerned about the 'dark tendencies that led to their creation'". On this choice, designer Bill Slavicsek wrote that the tiefling and dragonborn replaced "the better aspects of the half-orc" and that it was "time to let the half-orc fade from the game" unless "a better story comes along". Half-orcs then made their first appearance in the Forgotten Realms Player's Guide (2008).

Half-orcs are a playable character race in the Player's Handbook 2 (2009) and the Essentials rulebook Heroes of the Forgotten Kingdoms (2010). On the inclusion in the Player's Handbook 2, Appelcline explained that Wizards of the Coast "was ready to reinvent both" the half-orc and the gnome. He wrote that "the half-orc was initially based on the idea that the race had been purposefully bred to combine the 'strength and savagery of orcs with the decisive action of humans', but at the last minute the writers decided instead to present a multitude of options for how the race came to be" in the Player's Handbook 2. Designer James Wyatt explained that when including "various possibilities" for the origin of the half-orc, they hinted "that there's an unpleasant reality that people don't like to talk about", but also offered "some solid suggestions for origins that might be true in any given DM's world". Wyatt also noted that it is assumed "half-orc adventurers have half-orc parents".

The half-orc appeared in the Monster Manual 2 (2009).

=== Dungeons & Dragons 5th edition ===
Half-orcs are a playable character race in the 5th edition Player's Handbook (2014). The half-elf and half-orc were the only two supported mixed ancestries in the core rulebook. In August 2022, Wizards of the Coast launched the One D&D public playtest to update Dungeons & Dragons. The first playtest document removed the option of distinct rules for half-elves and half-orcs and replaced it with rules for mixed parentage where a player selects mechanical traits from one parent's race and has the choice of how their character visually appears with characteristics of both parents.

The Player's Handbook (2024), as part of the 2024 revision to the 5th Edition ruleset, does not include rules for species (previously described as races) with mixed ancestry; however, the designers noted this revision to the core rules is backward compatible so players have the option of adapting the 2014 rules for half-elves and half-orcs. On this shift in design, lead designer Jeremy Crawford commented, "frankly, we are not comfortable, and haven't been for years with any of the options that start with 'half'. The half construction is inherently racist so we simply aren't going to include it in the new Player's Handbook".

== Gameplay mechanics ==
In 1st and 2nd Editions, half-orc characters receive a +1 modifier to strength and constitution, and a −2 modifier to charisma ability scores.

In 3rd Edition and 3.5e, half-orc characters receive a +2 modifier to strength and −2 modifiers to intelligence and charisma. Half-orcs have darkvision up to 60 feet. They have orc blood and are susceptible to special effects that affect orcs, such as the orc's light sensitivity. They can use orc-only items. All half-orcs speak common and orc; they may also speak Draconic, Giant, Gnoll, Goblin, and Abyssal, and, in the rare cases of half-orcs with high intelligence, they may also speak the languages of their allies or rivals. The orcs' language has no alphabet and uses Dwarven script. Orc writing is found most often in graffiti.

In the 3rd Edition, the half-orc's favored character class is the barbarian. The half-orc personality tends to be short-tempered, sullen, and prone to action rather than thought. Half-orcs prefer simple pleasures: feasting, singing, wrestling and wild dancing. They have little interest in refined pursuits such as high art and philosophy. Half-orcs tend towards chaotic alignments, but have no clear preference towards good or evil. Half-orcs raised and living among orcs are more likely to be evil though.

== Culture ==
Due to their orcish blood, half-orcs are on poor terms with some of the other races. Relations are particularly troubled with elves and dwarves, due to racial enmity between orcs and these races. It is still possible for a half-orc to find camaraderie with an elf or a dwarf; dwarves in particular are willing to befriend half-orcs who have proven themselves worthy of trust. Half-elves tend to be sympathetic toward half-orcs, knowing the hardships of being an outcast from both of their parent races. Halflings and gnomes are generally accepting of half-orcs and happily interact with them. Half-orcs adopt different attitudes to gain acceptance from those who are wary of their orcish heritage. Some are reserved, some demonstrate public virtue, while others force respect through physical intimidation. Half-orcs living among humans may choose human names in order to fit in, or orcish names to intimidate others.

Half-orcs have no native lands; they most often live among orcs. When not living among orc tribes, half-orcs almost always live in human lands, as humans are more accepting of half-orcs than other races.

Many half-orcs worship Gruumsh, the chief orcish deity. Half-orc barbarians may worship Gruumsh as a war god even if they are not evil aligned. Half-orcs who identify with their human heritage follow human deities, and may engage in outspoken displays of piety to gain acceptance and solidify their bond to humans. In 4th edition, half-orcs may also choose to worship Kord, as they may choose to believe they have been created by Kord to be the perfect warrior race.

Half-orcs are frequently rejected by civilized society. They are drawn to violent careers suitable to their temperament and physical strength, becoming mercenaries or adventurers. They often find companionship among other adventurers, many of whom are fellow wanderers and outsiders.

== Reception ==
Academics Samuel Heine and Antoine Prémont, in 2021 at the International Conference on the Foundations of Digital Games, commented that the way in which Dungeons & Dragon presents half-orc is very different from the other half-human choice, the half-elf; while half-elves often seek to find their place as outsiders and become "a race of leaders, ambassadors and social butterflies", half-orcs tend to embody a more uncivilized, barbaric nature with a struggle to rein in their inner violence and have less adaptability than half-elves. In 2023, Benjamin Carpenter argued in the Howard Journal of Communications that the fictional racial categories in Dungeons & Dragons enables the spread of racial and racist ideologies by subtly introducing "racial conceptual frameworks". Carpenter opined that by explicitly incorporating "halfway-between racial categories", Dungeons & Dragons implies that a blend "of elven or orc blood with human (for human is always the referent of the unspecified 'half') constitutes something wholly distinct from its parent races" and this notion reinforces the boundaries of the "pure" and "unmixed" races, thereby supporting "a doctrine of racial difference".

In the book Co-opting Culture (2009), Ilan Mitchell-Smith wrote that half-orc description in "the Player's Handbook (2003) leaves no question as to the monstrosity and dangerous savagery of the full orcs, and so the half-orc becomes symbolic of inter-racial rape. Playing the half-savage is sanctioned, but in a way that maintains and in fact enforces notions of racial morality and behavior". Carpenter highlighted that the half-orc and half-elf reflect the "hegemonic center" of humanity, "the norm from which all other races deviate", in the game and these half-human races "do not operate identically due to the differential moral understanding of elves and orcs". Unlike the half-orc, the half-elf does not originate from any monstrous races and their description stresses this race's "fluidity, flexibility, and adaptability" while the description of the half-orc stresses barbarism and inherited rage from the monstrous orc parent – both are considered half-human but half-orcs are "understood as tainted by their orc parent" while "half-elves can cross the boundaries of their parent races, with this becoming a dignified strength".

Amanda Cote and Emily Saidel, in the book Fifty Years of Dungeons & Dragons (2024), traced the race trends over the various editions of the game and noted it was not until 4th Edition when the game "truly started disentangling race and [character] class". They explained that "in AD&D, both 'race' and class choices define minimums and maximums of wisdom, intelligence, and charisma" so "half-orcs have prescribed maximums below the minimums needed to play magic-users, paladins, or monks, thus excluding half-orcs from those classes". While the 3rd Edition allowed any combination of race and class, they argued that the two remained "deeply interwoven in restrictive ways" and noted that the 3rd Edition Player's Handbook (2000) stated "some races are better suited to some classes", such as barbarians typically consisting of half-orcs, humans, and dwarves. Academic Aaron Trammell wrote that early Dungeons & Dragons had negative mechanical attributes for some character races but the 5th Edition "now rewards players for choosing a nonhuman" – the half-orc gains a bonus to strength without a "penalty to intelligence and charisma" as it did in older editions. Cecilia D'Anastasio, for Wired, highlighted the "genetic determinism" in the game and noted that "stereotyping remains", observing that the half-orc has a "savage attack" ability. D'Anastasio argued the game "has made only trivial movements away from racial essentialism", such as removing the intellectual debuff to half-orcs.

Gus Wezerek, for FiveThirtyEight, reported that of the 5th Edition "class and race combinations per 100,000 characters that players created on D&D Beyond from" August 15 to September 15, 2017, half-orcs were the ninth most created at 5,039 total. The three most popular class combinations with the half-orc were barbarian (1,709), fighter (976), and paladin (427). Wezerek noted "some of the common character choices can be explained by the game's structure of racial bonuses". Matthew Byrd, for Den of Geek in 2023, highlighted that both half-orcs and half-elves have "stats/attributes" reflective of two races which "offered some unique role-playing options". Byrd noted that beyond the "statistical advantages", playing as a half-orc gives access to "certain orc abilities without having to play as a full orc and navigate all of the tricky (often hostile) social interactions orcs sometimes have to deal with". D'Anastasio commented that the attribute bonuses half-orcs receive make them "great barbarians" and other "race and class combinations" can result in exceptionalism, such as "half-orc scholars" or "gnome barbarians", where the character is "exceptional in a world that remains the same". Byrd commented that these half races "are notable for being specifically outlined during the character creation process in many versions of the game", however, Dungeons & Dragons is moving away from having these two as distinct races. Byrd thought that this development might "address some potential balancing issues". He also highlighted that this reflects "complaints/problems" about these two races being distinct while other mixed ancestries are not and that this is a holdover from the early game lifting design concepts by J. R. R. Tolkien, who mentioned these two "as separate races". Byrd opined that while Crawford's comments drew "a lot of heat", the shift "seems to be based on statistical and character creation balancing changes as much as (if not more than) concerns over the social implications of those older designs".

== See also ==
- Heroes of High Favor: Half-Orcs
