= Character race =

Role-playing game terminology

Character race is a descriptor used to describe the various sapient species and beings that make up the setting in modern fantasy and science fiction. In many tabletop role-playing games and video games, players may choose to be one of these creatures when creating their player character (PC) or encounter them as a non-player character (NPC). "People" is to be taken in the broader sense, and may encompass ethnic groups, species, nationality (Note: e.g. in Savage Worlds' Pirates of the Spanish Main or Weird War II) or social groups. (Note: In Rolemaster Oriental Companion, “Common man” and “Noble” are two distinct human races, although Nobles are said to have some divine or elfic ancestors)

== Overview ==
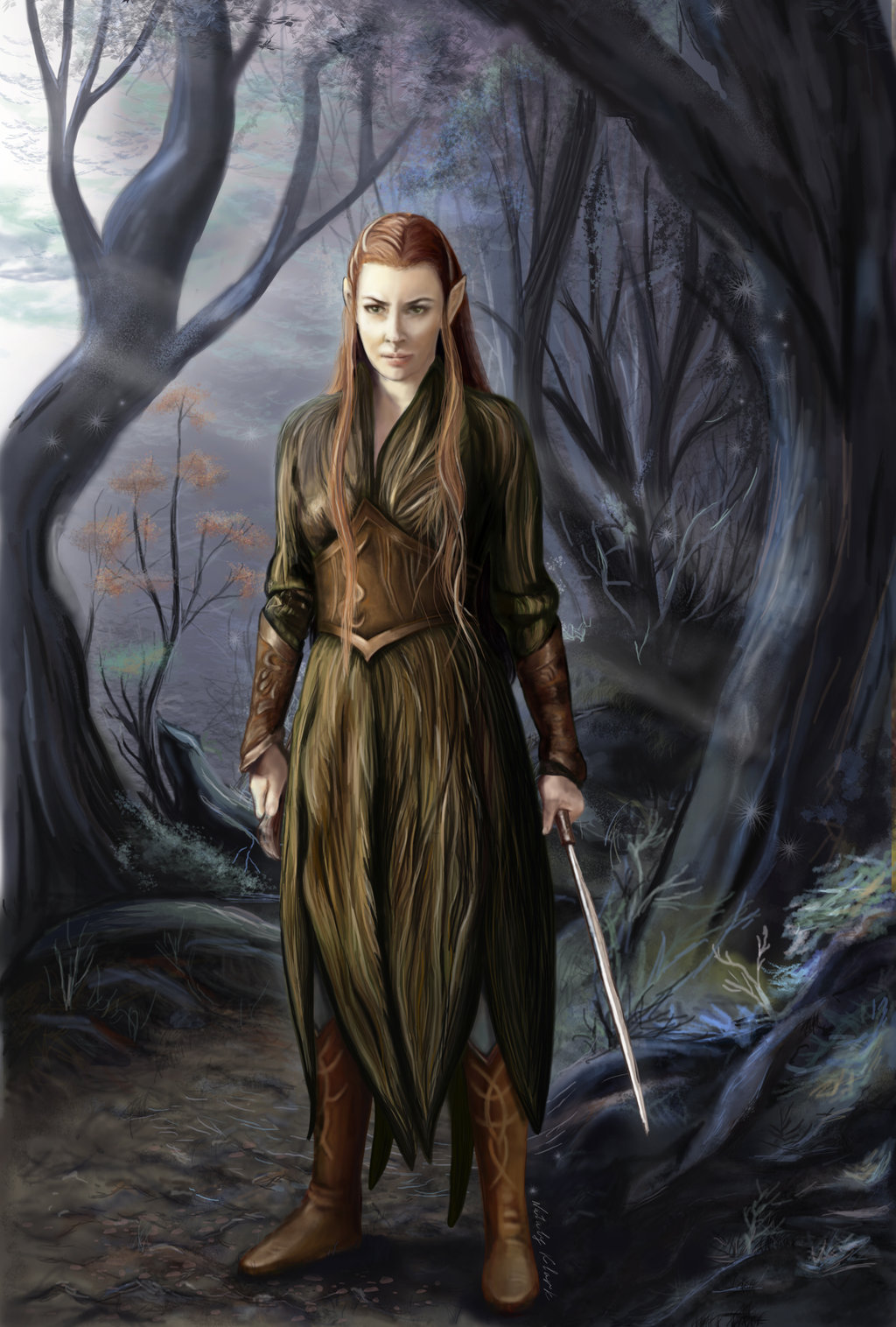
An elf as inspired by Tolkien. In fantasy, races are often based on humanoid and/or intelligent creatures from myths and folklore.

In this fantasy world, the word "race" means the same as and replaces "species".

— Earthdawn (1993) p.38

Many fantasy stories and worlds refer to their main sapient humanoid creatures as races, rather than species in order to distinguish them from non-sapient creatures. J. R. R. Tolkien popularized the usage of the term in this context in his legendarium (particularly The Lord of the Rings), and the use of races in the Dungeons & Dragons role-playing games further spread the name. Character race can refer to a fictitious species from a fictional universe, or a real people, especially in case of a history-based universe (even if it has a given level of fantasy (Note: e.g. Call of Cthulhu (1981), Boot Hill (1975) or Bushido (1979).)).

The term "race" is even broader than the usual meaning, as it also includes creatures such as extraterrestrial beings, vegetal beings, (Note: e.g. the Aldryami in Glorantha (1978), or the Sylvanians in Fantasy Craft (2010)) and robots. (Note: e.g. Artificials in Fantasy Craft or the Forgeborn/Dwarf-forged optional race in 13th Age (2013).)

This notion began in fantasy or science-fiction works: novels, comics, video games (especially role-playing video game), board games, LARP, etc. The transmediality is obvious in case of consistent universes, e.g. the Middle Earth or the Star Wars universe.

Not all works use the term "race": in Tunnels and Trolls 7th ed. (2005), Ken St. Andre uses the term "kinship"; the term Spezies (species) is used in Das Schwarze Auge, and éthnie (ethnicity) is used in EW-System 2.0. As part of the 2024 revision to the 5th Edition Dungeons & Dragons ruleset, the game updated its terminology from race to species.

In the heroic fantasy games, in addition to humans, races are often humanoid and fey creatures of myth; such as elves, dwarves, orcs, goblins, immaterial being (spirits, ghosts), etc. Some fantasy or steampunk games also involve "artificial creatures" (alchemical homunculus, golems, and mechanical creatures). In science-fiction games, especially space opera and cyberpunk, the races are humans, extraterrestrials, mutants, cyborgs, transhumans, robots, and artificial intelligences (AI).

In some universes, it is possible to have hybrid characters which inherit traits from both parents. For example, in Dungeons & Dragons, it is possible to play a half-elf (hybrid of a human and an elf) or a half-orc (hybrid of a human and an orc).

== Game design ==
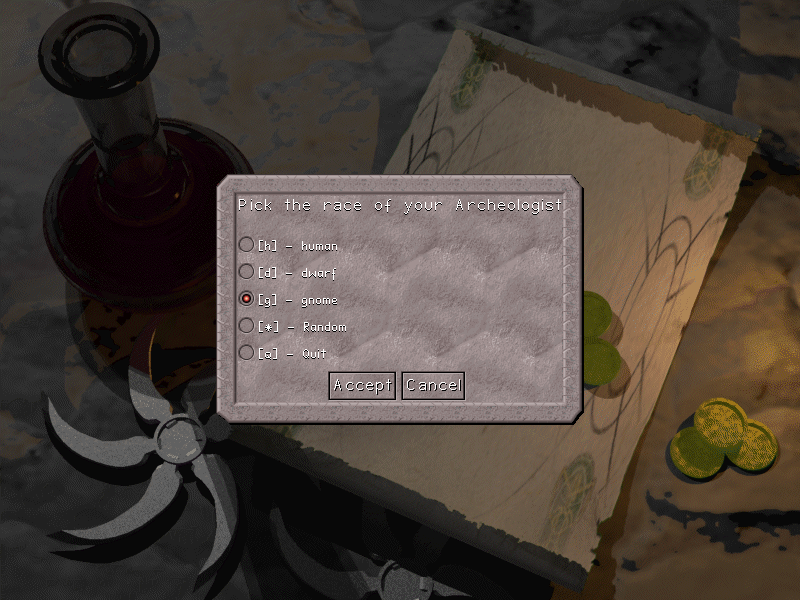
Race selection screen in Falcon's Eye.

The book Fundamentals of Game Design (2013) states: "in RPGs, race refers to groups of real and fantasy humanoids such as humans, dwarves, elves, giants, and so on. A better term would be species, but race is the term established by convention". According to Coralie David, in role-playing games, the characters are defined by "bricks"; they are in fact "syntagms of fictional paradigms". (Note: French: syntagmes de paradigmes fictionnels) This makes the immersion of the player easier, as anyone can build their own character in a way that is consistent with the fictional universe.

[As they describe various archetypes,] the authors of Dungeons & Dragons draw paradigms, the gears and bricks that compose them. It is possible to play Hobbits, Elves, Humans [… The players] will use bricks to build their own characters. The characters will be in fact structured like a set of gears that are both fictional and ludic.

— Coralie David, Role-playing game and fictional writing

Thus, the race is one of these bricks, as it provides a set of predefined parameters (diegetic paradigms) and of characteristics—in the broad sense: physical characteristics, cultural background, moral values and social relationships. The fictional world is built as a consistent system made of "exposed" bricks that can be easily identified, and this promotes creativity and sharing; it also promotes the imaginary creation by the player (or reader). The race itself can be made of "sub-bricks" the player can choose, e.g. in After the Bomb 2nd ed. (2001), the player can build his own race by a combination of a basic animal race and mutations. Academic Kimberly Young highlighted the virtual societies of role-playing video games where character design choices can immerse players. Young wrote that "the player must decide a character's race, its species, history, heritage, and philosophy. The genres and themes vary depending on the game. [...] Studies show that a character's identity seeps into the player—that is, as players spend hours living as this 'other person,' they begin to identify with the character that feels more real and less fictional the longer they play".

Williams et al. (2018), in the book Role-Playing Game Studies: Transmedia Foundations, highlighted that in many role-playing games character races "are typically depicted and rule-modelled as biologically distinct species with different inherited traits [...]. These biological differences go hand in hand with different ethnic backgrounds like language, culture, history, or geographic origin, and even moral character and cosmic destiny. In a sense, the races in RPGs embody outmoded racial thought of the 19th century and earlier that assumes 'race' as a biologically or even cosmically determined unity of physiological species, ethnic culture, and geographic place". Linda Codega, for Gizmodo in 2022, commented that "there are some critical points of game design that would help remove inherent bioessentialism and move away from racial coding; the removal of prescriptive skill packages, the decoupling of traits from race, the elimination of bloodlines and blood quantum mechanics, better mixed-race mechanics, and elimination of racialized language".

== History ==
The first role-playing game, "original" Dungeons & Dragons (1974), stems from the wargame Chainmail (1971). Chainmail was especially designed to include fantasy races. Aaron Trammell, in the essay Representation and Discrimination in Role-Playing Games, wrote "that races are then modeled as fixed statistical differences is arguably due to the game mechanics TRPGs inherited from wargames". The races in Dungeons & Dragons are strongly inspired by the fantasy literature of the 1930s-1960s. It thus includes the Tolkienian archetypes, but the game makes a difference between the races that can be played as player characters (Note: Such as: humans, elves, dwarves, gnomes, halflings (initially called hobbits), half-elves and half-orcs) and the "monsters", (Note: Such as: orcs, goblins, kobolds, trolls, ogres, gnolls, etc.) which can only be non-player characters, and which are by name opposed to the player characters. Trammell highlighted that Dungeons & Dragons game rules up through the 5th Edition (2014) "model race as a fixed biological species with fundamental bodily differences – some races are inherently stronger, smarter, more charming, etc. than others. This reproduces an essentialist understanding of race found in eugenics (Fisher 1918), which sought statistical evidence for inherited traits linked to race in humans. Although long disproven by research, this biologistic concept of human race is the primary way in which race has been modelled in TRPG rules, from D&D to many other influential and current games, such as Empire of the Petal Throne, GURPS, or Pathfinder".

In the first science-fiction role-playing game, Metamorphosis Alpha (1976), it is possible to play humans and mutated creatures.

In 1975, Tunnels & Trolls allows for the first time to play "monsters", i.e. a player character can be any race, including possibly a "monster", but the races are not described in this game; in the 1979 solo adventure Goblin Lake, the player character is a goblin. The 1983 game Palladium Fantasy Role-Playing Game also allows "monsters" as PCs (e.g. goblin or a kobold), and these races are described in the same way as the "non-monster" races.

The first fantasy game that breaks with the D&D conventions is RuneQuest: the "elves" (Aldryami) are vegetal beings, it is possible to play a duck [sic], but the game also takes into account the cult (pantheon and system of beliefs such as animism) and the cultural background of the character's people: primitive, barbarian, nomadic or civilized. As opposed to Dungeons & Dragons, the character is not totally defined by race and class, but by a list of skills (what the character can do); the cultural background defines the basic value of the skills, and the cult the access to magic. The race is thus less important in a functional point of view (how the character can interact with the fictional world), but more important in a mimetic point of view (roleplay).

The second edition of the Pathfinder Roleplaying Game, released in 2019, moved away from the "race" terminology for characters and instead replaced it with a character's "heritage" and "ancestry". CBR highlighted that these new terms "invoke a sense of history and cultural importance that accompanies many player's choices behind their character design" and "help offer explanations for why those predispositions exist that do not imply disturbing real-world parallels, simultaneously offering more freedom in the variations from that norm players will necessarily make in creating their own characters". In 2022, the Dungeons & Dragons One D&D playtest also changed the terminology from "race" to "species", as the game moves away from racial stereotypes associated with older fantasy settings. In 2023, Wizards of the Coast clarified that the playtest will include updated rules for characters with mixed heritage. The Player's Handbook (2024), as part of the 2024 revision to the 5th Edition Dungeons & Dragons ruleset, does not include rules for species with mixed ancestry.

=== Generic races ===
The "original" Dungeons & Dragons (OD&D), and the first Advanced Dungeons & Dragons manuals (AD&D), do not describe any particular universe. The universe is only described through the game rules (magic, gods, fantasy races), and it outlines a generic universe inspired by popular fantasy novels of the 1930s-1960s. The race is essentially a list of capabilities—functional part—and a rather thin description that is often limited to the visual appearance, with an illustration, and some elements of customs. The way the race takes place in the fictional universe is described in optional books, the "campaign settings" or "world books". The race is thus mainly a "functional tool", a set of functions that the player can implement in the adventure: the elves can see in the dark, and in OD&D hobbits can only be fighting men. The Player's Handbook (1978) also provide a table of "Racial preferences" and racial restrictions to the alignment.

TSR Hobbies assumed anyone buying D&D knew what Hobbits are, there was no real description and the only reason they seemed to have been included was to reinforce the game's connection with Tolkien's stories.

— Ronald Mark Pehr, A Change of Hobbit

The player thus has to pick from their own knowledge of other works, particularly in what is now called the "geek culture"; according to Isabelle Périer, PhD in comparative literature:

[this intertextuality] is a concision tool—it allows to quickly get into the middle of the action—and an opening towards variations—you can then play with the stereotypes.

— Isabelle Périer, Role-playing games: another form of youth literature?

=== Race-driven campaign ===
In 1989, Jean-Luc Bizien creates Hurlements (Note: French for "howls") in which players characters are "errants", "wanderers", i.e. were-animals that form a caravan. The race of were-animals, and their relationship with the humans, become the main subject of the adventures, and not only a functional element or a flavor to the universe. Other games were then published where the race of the player characters is itself the main topic of the adventures, such as Vampire: The Masquerade (1991) and Nephilim (1992).

== Reception ==
As aforementioned, some campaign settings are based on real world events, and thus depict real peoples. The way the people are described can be problematic and may sometimes be considered as offensive. For example, French articles criticized the way the Soviets were depicted in The Price of Freedom (1986).

Williams et al. (2018), in the book Role-Playing Game Studies: Transmedia Foundations, commented that many tabletop role-playing games "essentialize race" and that "game rules regularly claim that there are objective, immutable, and strong differences between races. [...] While RPG player demographics appear to move towards an equitable, post-racialized, post-gendered vision of 21st century pluralist societies, the fictional worlds of RPGs are still often highly stratified".

The system of race in Dungeons & Dragons has been thrust further into the spotlight in recent years. Similar to the ways certain nationalities were depicted, some consider the races in Dungeons & Dragons particularly problematic, as it is believed that they stem from stereotypes surrounding real-world races. Gizmodo highlighted that "racial bioessentialism is a core design crutch for Dungeons & Dragons". In July 2020, Wizards of the Coast released a statement – titled Diversity and Dungeons & Dragons – where they address these issues, saying "some of the peoples in the game—orcs and drow being two of the prime examples—have been characterized as monstrous and evil, using descriptions that are painfully reminiscent of how real-world ethnic groups have been and continue to be denigrated. That's just not right, and it's not something we believe in". In December 2022, Wizards of the Coast announced that the word "race" would no longer be used to refer to a character's biological traits and instead would be replaced with the word "species"; this change went into effect with the December One D&D playtest release. The press release stated that "'race' is a problematic term that has had prejudiced links between real world people and the fantasy peoples of D&D worlds" and that terminology change was made with the consultation of "multiple outside cultural consultants". The 2024 revision to the 5th Edition Dungeons & Dragons ruleset did not include half-elves and half-orcs as a player species option. On this shift in design, lead designer Jeremy Crawford commented, "frankly, we are not comfortable, and haven't been for years with any of the options that start with 'half'. The half construction is inherently racist so we simply aren't going to include it in the new Player's Handbook".
