= 1983 in games =

This page lists board and card games, wargames, miniatures games, and tabletop role-playing games published in 1983. For video games, see 1983 in video gaming.

== Games released or invented in 1983 ==
- Ambush!
- B-17, Queen of the Skies
- Stalking the Night Fantastic (role-playing game)
- Calamity
- City of Sorcerers
- Dark Cults
- Dampfross
- Empires in Arms
- File 13
- James Bond 007: Role-Playing In Her Majesty's Secret Service
- Lost Worlds
- Mercenaries, Spies and Private Eyes (role-playing game)
- The Omega War
- Palladium Fantasy Role-Playing Game
- Scotland Yard
- Superworld (role-playing game)
- Valley of the Pharaohs (role-playing game)

== Game awards given in 1983 ==
- Spiel des Jahres: Scotland Yard

== Significant game-related events in 1983 ==
- Decipher, Inc. was founded by Warren Holland.

== Deaths ==
Date	Name	Age	Notability
February 24	Roy Krenkel	76	Fantasy illustrator who did work for Fantasy Games Unlimited

== See also ==
- 1983 in video gaming
