= Eberron: Forge of the Artificer =

Dungeons & Dragons fantasy role-playing game source book

- Rules required: Dungeons & Dragons, 5th edition
- First published: December 9, 2025
- ISBN: 9780786970001

Eberron: Forge of the Artificer is a sourcebook for the 5th edition of the Dungeons & Dragons fantasy role-playing game. The book includes options for players in the Eberron setting, including the artificer character class, as well as adventure outlines for the Dungeon Master.

== Summary ==
As part of the 2024 revision to the 5th Edition Dungeons & Dragons ruleset, the sourcebook expands on the world of Eberron along with revising the ruleset. This includes a revised artificer character class, revised dragonmarks, revised species of the setting, the introduction of the khoravar (Eberron's half-elves) as a new species choice, and three campaign outlines.

== Publication history ==
In December 2024, a revised version of the artificer using the Player's Handbook (September 2024) ruleset was released as an Unearthed Arcana playtest. Then in January 2025, Wizards of the Coast announced Eberron: Forge of the Artificer (2025) as a new Eberron setting book; it serves as a companion sourcebook to Eberron: Rising from the Last War (2019). Further playtest adjustments to the artificer were released in February 2025.

Wizards of the Coast previewed players' options from this sourcebook at PAX East in May 2025; premade characters, using the updated rules, were provided for use during game sessions for the new Eberron adventure Race for the Crab Temple. The sourcebook Eberron: Forge of the Artificer (2025) was scheduled to be published in August 2025; however, the release was delayed to December 9, 2025 due to a cover warping issue which required a total reprint of the print run.

== Reception ==
A review for Wargamer praised the worthwhile character options, especially the updated artificer subclasses, certain dragonmarks and rules for airships and strongholds, but criticized its short length, reliance on its companion book Eberron: Rising from the Last War (2019), as well as undetailed adventures.

A review for CBR praised the improved availability of dragonmarks for every species and the adaption of patron rules for players from Tasha's Cauldron of Everything (2020) to the Eberron setting. It criticized the updates to the character species changeling and shifter as too timid and the artificer subclass cartographer as more suitable to the ranger class. The review describes the book as incomplete without access to Eberron: Rising from the Last War (2019).

A review for Polygon noted that the updates to the artificer class make it more versatile and replace disliked features.

A review for GameDaily noted the book is designed for players interested in the artificer class. It criticized the lack of detail in adventures and an unrefined stronghold system, but praised the experimental player options.
