= Ranger (Dungeons & Dragons) =

Character class in roleplaying games

- Dungeons & Dragons character class

Editions
- Standard class: 2nd; 3rd; v3.5; 4th; 5th; 5.5e
- Alternate class: Original
- Subclass: 1st

Publication history
- Introduction: The Strategic Review volume 1, number 2
- Source books: The Strategic Review; Player's Handbook (1978, 1989, 2000, 2003, 2008, 2014, 2024)

Grouping
- 1E base class: Fighter
- 2E group: Warrior
- 4E powersource: Martial
- 4E role: Striker

The Ranger is one of the standard playable character classes in most editions of the Dungeons & Dragons fantasy role-playing game. Rangers are skilled bushcraftsmen/woodcraftsmen, and often lived reclusive lives as hermits.

== Publication history ==
=== Creative origins ===
The ranger was primarily based on the character Aragorn (Strider), and the Rangers of the North of J. R. R. Tolkien's Middle-earth mythos, as warriors who use tracking and other wilderness skills to hunt down their enemies. The AD&D second edition handbook mentions several other inspirations from myth and legend, such as Robin Hood, Jack the Giant Killer, the huntress Diana, and the Greek hero Orion.

=== Original Dungeons & Dragons ===
The ranger was introduced in The Strategic Review volume 1, number 2.

=== Advanced Dungeons & Dragons 1st edition ===
The ranger was one of the standard character-classes available in the original Player's Handbook, one of five subclasses. The first edition rangers were a subtype of the fighters, using any weapon and wearing any armor, but they gained extra attacks at a slower rate than fighters and paladins. Unlike other warriors, the ranger used d8 hit dice instead of d10s, but had a second hit die at 1st level and maxed out at 11 hit dice instead of nine. Rangers also had extensive tracking abilities, based on a percentage score, and were able to surprise opponents on a roll of 1–3 on a d6 (rather than a 1–2) while they themselves could only be surprised on a 1. Rangers gained limited spell use at level 8, acquiring 1st–3rd level druid spells and 1st and 2nd level magic-user spells (two per level maximum). Rangers were most effective when fighting giants and humanoids (such as orcs), gaining a +1 to damage per level against these opponents.

High level rangers gained followers, ranging in type and power from classed player-character races, to creatures such as pegasus mounts, pseudodragons, werebears, copper dragons and storm giants. As a general rule, the fewer followers a ranger gained (based on random dice rolls) the more powerful each individual follower was. Rangers were required to be of good alignment, and were initially limited to humans and half-elves. The only multi-class option open to rangers was the ranger/cleric, allowed to half-elves.

=== Basic Dungeons & Dragons ===
The ranger was not available as a character class in the game's "Basic" edition. However, the Best of Dragon Magazine volumes 2–3 contained variant rules for rangers for this version, including spell lists, henchmen, and tracking ability.

=== Advanced Dungeons & Dragons 2nd Edition ===
Rangers went through several changes in the 2nd edition. Their hit dice were changed to match fighters and paladins. Rangers could still wear any armor, but several of their new abilities required the use of light armor, including the skill to use two weapons without penalty and the thief-like abilities of move-silently and hide-in-shadows. The class retained its tracking abilities but the ability was based on a skill check instead of a percentage roll. Rangers also gained an animal empathy ability which allowed them to calm frightened or hostile animals. Instead of gaining a damage bonus against all giant and humanoid monsters, the ranger focused on a specific creature, which did not have to be of giant or humanoid stock. The class's spell abilities were also limited to 1st–3rd level priest spells from the plant and animal spheres. Higher level rangers could recruit various woodland animals, mythical creatures (such as the treant, pegasus, and pixie), and classed characters including druids, clerics, or other rangers as followers.

Although Rangers were generally Good-aligned, an evil version was featured with the Paka, a race of shape-shifting feline humanoids native to Ravenloft who are hostile to mankind.

Like other classes in AD&D 2nd Ed, the Ranger received its own expansion handbook, The Complete Ranger's Handbook, published in 1993. The handbook provides many new kits, equipment, and options for ranger characters.

=== Dungeons & Dragons 3rd edition ===
The 3rd edition of Dungeons & Dragons saw more changes to the ranger. The species enemy was now called favored enemy, and the ranger was allowed to select additional enemies during advancement. The class retained its spellcasting ability, but gained it much earlier, and had its own spell list. The nature of the ranger's companions also changed significantly. Instead of gaining multiple followers the ranger gained a single animal companion, and at an earlier level than in previous editions. The race and alignment restrictions of the earlier editions were dropped, allowing evil rangers for the first time.

=== Dungeons & Dragons 4th edition ===
Rangers in the 4th edition retained their ability to specialize in archery or two weapon fighting. Rangers had the striker role, specializing in single-target damage, as well as mobility. They had the martial power source, and, like all martial classes, their powers were called exploits. Their special abilities made them better suited to hit and run tactics and focusing on a single opponent. Other abilities allowed the ranger to aid his companions with skill checks and avoiding ambushes.

==== Dungeons & Dragons Essentials ====
The Essentials rulebook Heroes of the Forgotten Kingdoms presented two alternate versions of the ranger, the hunter and the scout. The hunter focused on ranged attacks, while the scout focused on melee attacks.

=== Dungeons & Dragons 5th edition ===
The ranger was included as a character class in the 5th edition Player's Handbook (2014). Rangers are a half caster class in 5th edition, gaining limited spellcasting. Their features and spells focus on exploration, survival skills, and tracking foes. At third level, players chose from one of two ranger archetypes: the Hunter, and the Beast Master. The hunter archetype gains combative capabilities, while the beast master gains an animal companion to control. Several sourcebooks since the launch of 5th edition have expanded the number of ranger archetype options. Xanathar's Guide to Everything (2017) added three more ranger archetypes: the Gloom Stalker, Horizon Walker and Monster Slayer. The Gloom Stalker focuses upon hiding in areas of low light, the Horizon Walker gains access to certain teleportation features, and the Monster Slayer becomes adept at attacking certain studied foes. Tasha's Cauldron of Everything (2020) added two more archetypes: Fey Wanderer and Swarmkeeper.

In 2016, due to criticisms of the ranger as presented in the Player's Handbook (2014), the "Revised Ranger" class was released as part of the Unearthed Arcana playtest. This playtest version "made some of the ranger's core abilities easier to use and specifically fixed how a ranger uses its animal companion, giving a ranger the animal at Level 3 and allowing a ranger to attack with both its weapon and the animal on the same turn". However, this new version of the class is not legal for organized play such as in the Adventurer's League. Since the release of the "Revised Ranger", Jeremy Crawford, Co-Lead Designer of the 5th Edition, has reiterated multiple times that there no plans to release an official alternate version of the class. In November 2019, Wizards of the Coast released a new Unearthed Arcana titled Class Feature Variants, which added additional class features for all classes including the Ranger. These new class feature variants where introduced in 2020, with the release of Tasha's Cauldron of Everything, as optional rules, including an optional revision of the Beastmaster's companion feature.

=== One D&D ===
Playtesting for the next version of Ranger was announced. In September 2022, they released the Unearthed Arcana 2022 - Expert Classes playtest material for One D&D which included rules for playing a Ranger up to level 20, as well as the Hunter subclass.

== Reception ==
Screen Rant rated the ranger class as the least powerful class of the base 12 character classes in the 5th edition. "The reason this class gets the lowest ranking is because it forces players to be kind of specific. Being able to have a favored enemy and terrain is kind of cool because the character gets all sorts of bonuses, but if the Ranger is good, say, in the Underdark fighting aberrations, but the DM has set the adventure in a desert ruin somewhere, well, those bonuses won't do much good. That being said, the Revised Ranger stats help balance this out a little bit. Players don't have to be as specific, but still".

In 2018, Christian Hoffer, for ComicBook, wrote that "many current D&D fans believe that the ranger class is the weakest in the game, due to a combination of poor class-specific abilities and weak damage output. The 'Beast Master' ranger subclass is the most criticized version of the ranger [...]. While not official, many fans preferred the Revised Ranger to the original Ranger class found in the Player's Handbook". Hoffer also highlighted Crawford's reiteration that the ranger class would not change and wrote "surprisingly, Crawford's comment became the flashpoint for tons of D&D debate over the weekend on various boards and forums, with players debating the merits of the core Ranger class and the revisions seemingly discarded by the D&D team. [...] Unless you're playing in an Adventurer's League game, it's ultimately up to the DM whether or not you can use the Revised Ranger rules. Homebrewing is extremely common in Dungeons & Dragons, and there's nothing stopping home games from using a Revised Ranger to their heart's content".

In 2019, Jeremy Thomas, for 411Mania, wrote that "the Ranger has long been a source of criticism for D&D players in Fifth Edition, who have argued that the Beast Master subclass in particular is underpowered. Wizards even released a Revised Ranger class, which would potentially be an optional take on the class and not replace the core version".

The Gamer rated the 5th edition ranger subclass Horizon Walker as the 8th most awesome subclass out of the 32 new character options in Xanathar’s Guide to Everything.

Gus Wezerek, for FiveThirtyEight, reported that of the 5th edition "class and race combinations per 100,000 characters that players created on D&D Beyond from" August 15 to September 15, 2017, rangers were the 6th most created at 8,887 total. Elf (3,076) was the most common racial combination followed by human (1,715) and then half-elf (891). Elf ranger was the second most created character out of all the class and race combinations.
