= Druid (Dungeons & Dragons) =

Character class in the Dungeons & Dragons roleplaying game

- Dungeons & Dragons character class

Editions
- Standard class: 2nd; 3rd; v3.5; 5th
- Alternate class: Original; 4th
- Subclass: 1st
- Prestige class: Basic
- First appearance: Supplement III: Eldritch Wizardry (1976)
- Source books: Eldritch Wizardry; Companion Set; Player's Handbook (1978, 1989, 2000, 2003, 2014); Player's Handbook 2

Inspiration
- Based on: Druid

Grouping
- 1E base class: Cleric
- 2E group: Priest
- 4E powersource: Primal
- 4E role: Controller

The druid is a playable character class in the Dungeons & Dragons fantasy role-playing game. Druids wield nature-themed magic. Druids cast spells like clerics, but unlike them do not have special powers against undead and, in some editions, cannot use metal armor. Druids have a unique ability that allows them to change into various animal forms, and various other qualities that assist them in natural settings.

== Publication history ==
=== Creative origins ===
The druid is named for the pre-Christian Celtic priests called druids. In the book The Evolution of Fantasy Role-Playing Games (2014), Michael Tresca highlighted that "historically, druids did revere trees as nature spirits. [...] Zoomorphism was common enough to justify druids transforming into all kinds of animals. [...] Conspicuously lacking from Dungeons & Dragons is the role of sacrifices in druidic rituals".

=== Original Dungeons & Dragons ===
Druids appeared, but not as player characters, in the original Greyhawk supplement from 1975. They were presented as a player character class in the Eldritch Wizardry supplement in 1976.

=== Advanced Dungeons & Dragons 1st edition ===
The druid was one of the standard character classes available in the original Player's Handbook, and appeared as a sub-class of cleric. The druid was one of five subclasses presented in the original Players Handbook. Originally, druids were very limited in their choice of weapons and armor (not able to wear any metal armor, and only permitted a few weapons, though that did include the scimitar and crossbow), and were of True Neutral alignment, but were able to cast spells more times per day than the magic-user and at a faster speed than clerics; they also had access to both healing and attack spells (albeit at different levels). Essentially, they were in many ways in between the cleric and the magic-user in function and use, with different special abilities. There were also a set of societal rules governing druidic life as well as higher-level abilities. In order to reach some of the higher levels, players had to defeat a higher-level druid in combat; after accomplishing this, they earned different titles (such as Archdruid) and gained lower-level druids as followers. The later-published accessory Unearthed Arcana featured several higher-level abilities for druids, including the ability to summon various elementals and para-elementals, the ability to enter and survive in various planes (such as the elemental planes and the Plane of Shadow), and so on.

=== Basic Dungeons & Dragons ===
The druid was available as a character class in the game's "Basic" edition, introduced in the Companion Set. Druids were clerics who adhered to a special code of conduct, maintaining a Neutral alignment; in exchange they gained some special powers and additional spells.

=== Advanced Dungeons & Dragons 2nd edition ===
According to the second edition Player's Handbook, the druid class is only loosely patterned after the historical druids of Europe during the days of the Roman Empire and acted as advisors to chieftains with great influence over the tribesmen.

In 2nd edition AD&D, druids were presented as an example of a 'specialty priest', also known as a priest of a specific mythos, differentiated by spells and powers and ethos. The 2nd Ed AD&D druid was more similar to the cleric in terms of spellcasting (druids now learned spells at the same rate and level as clerics, as long as the spells were available to them; casting times were also the same). Certain higher level abilities as introduced in Unearthed Arcana were also removed (or ignored), such as the ability to enter the Plane of Shadow. The Complete Druid's Handbook, published in 1994, provided more details on the druid class, including druidic society, magic groves, class kits and herbal lore.

=== Dungeons & Dragons 3rd edition ===
Druid is one of the base character classes presented in the 3rd edition Player's Handbook (2000). In the 3.5 edition of Dungeons & Dragons, Druids are free to use different forms of weaponry, but they lose the ability to cast spells or change into animal form for a day if they wear metal armor. The alignment restriction now requires that druids remain neutral on at least one (but not necessarily both) alignment axis (Good vs. Evil and Law vs. Chaos). i.e., they are restricted to Chaotic Neutral, Lawful Neutral, Neutral Good, Neutral Evil, or True Neutral, to reflect belief in the balance and amoral, impartial character of the natural world. Druids have also gained the ability to have a special animal companion; other abilities have been added or modified as well. For example, they can spontaneously convert a prepared spell in order to summon an animal that will serve as a temporary but loyal ally.

In the 3rd edition Player's Handbook, Druids were limited to a single animal shape. In the 3.5 edition, Druids are allowed significantly more freedom so that an appropriate animal shape can be chosen to match the circumstances. At higher levels Druids can even change into elementals. Animal companions are more clearly defined in the 3.5 edition as well.

=== Dungeons & Dragons 4th edition ===
The Druid was introduced to Fourth Edition with Player's Handbook 2. The newest incarnation of the class has the Primal power source and the Controller role. They are proficient in simple weapons and light armor, use staves and totems as implements, generally use Wisdom for power attack and damage rolls and, like all primal classes, their powers are called evocations.

Unlike most classes, druids know a third at-will attack power, however they must have at least one and at most two at-will attack powers with the "Beast Form" keyword. Each of the two Druid builds presented in the Player's Handbook 2 emphasizes one of the class's two secondary roles. Guardian druids lean towards the Leader role, focus on Constitution and ranged evocations, and take the "Primal Guardian" class feature, which allows them to use their Constitution bonus in place of their Dexterity or Intelligence bonus when determining AC while wearing light armour, as well as giving some druid evocations additional effects, many of which are based on Constitution. Predator druids lean towards the Striker role, focus on Dexterity and melee and short range evocations, and take the "Primal Predator" class feature, which makes them more mobile while wearing light armor, as well as giving some druid evocations additional effects, many of which are based on Dexterity.

All druids also have "Wild Shape", an at-will power which allows them to switch between their natural and beast forms. While in beast form, they cannot use weapons, and cannot use weapon or implement attack powers without the "Beast Form" keyword. Like clerics and wizards, druids gain Ritual Caster as a bonus feat.

==== Dungeons & Dragons Essentials ====
The Essentials rulebook Heroes of the Forgotten Kingdoms presented an alternate core version of the Druid, known as the Sentinel.

=== Dungeons & Dragons 5th edition ===
The druid is included as a character class in the 5th edition Player's Handbook (2014); druids utilize divine magic in this edition. Druid spells are typically devoted to communing with nature, interpreting or directing the weather, communicating with creatures and plants, and the like. The druid shares some spells with the cleric, such as some healing spells, and has a number of offensive spells which use the power of nature—calling down lightning storms, for example, or summoning wild animals to fight. They also gain special powers such as the shapeshifting ability "Wild Shape"; but these are not mechanically considered spells.

Included in the Player's Handbook are two Druid subclasses: the Circle of the Land and the Circle of the Moon. Several sourcebooks published since the launch of 5th edition have expanded the number of Druid Circle options. Xanathar's Guide to Everything (2017) added the Circle of Dreams and the Circle of the Shepherd. Guildmasters' Guide to Ravnica (2018) added the Circle of Spores, which was then reprinted in Tasha's Cauldron of Everything (2020) along with two new options: Circle of Stars and Circle of Wildfire. All subclasses offer additional features for the druid. In addition to those features, some druid circles offer an expanded spell list, which may include spells not typically available to druids, and augmented or alternate uses for their "Wild Shape" ability.

== Campaign settings ==
=== Dark Sun ===
Druids are bound to the essence of a particular oasis or other geographic location.

== Reception ==
In the book The Evolution of Fantasy Role-Playing Games (2014), Tresca compared the class to the Celtic druids the class was inspired by: "Druids could be classified as neutral alignment, in that druids were on both sides of morality. Celtic stories are filled with accounts of druids on both sides, undoing each other's spells, and batting in fantastic magical combats that would make any role-player envious. But the alignment of druids as being true neutral was simply not accurate; druids were just as passionate about one ethos as anybody else."

Screen Rant rated the druid class as the 10th most powerful class of the base 12 character classes in the 5th edition.

Gus Wezerek, for FiveThirtyEight, reported that of the 5th edition "class and race combinations per 100,000 characters that players created on D&D Beyond from" August 15 to September 15, 2017, druids were the least created at 6,328 total. Elf (1,779) was the most common racial combination followed by human (996) and then genasi (584).
