= Heroes of High Favor: Half-Orcs =

Heroes of High Favor: Half-Orcs is a 2002 supplement for d20 System role-playing games published by Bad Axe Games.

== Contents ==
Heroes of High Favor: Half-Orcs is a supplement in which a toolkit for half-orc characters delivers ten prestige classes, new feats, savage craftsmanship rules, beast‑breeding options, and expanded skill uses.

== Reviews ==
- Pyramid
- Fictional Reality (Issue 10 - Dec 2002)
