= Top Ballista =

Tabletop role-playing game supplement for Dungeons & Dragons

- Author: Carl Sargent
- Genre: Role-playing game
- Publisher: TSR
- Publication date: 1989

Top Ballista is an accessory for the Dungeons & Dragons fantasy role-playing game.

== Contents ==
Top Ballista is a supplement for a campaign setting in the city of Serraine, populated by the magical biplane-piloting skygnomes, and presents rules to create player characters (PCs) of skygnomes and other races.

The aerial city of Serraine flies over the Known World carrying its skygnome inhabitants, creators of bizarre yet workable inventions. The book describes the flying aces of the Top Ballista squadrons, gnomes who pilot flying machines, World War I style fighter planes, equipped with lightning guns and synchronized crossbows. Creatures featured in the product, all living in Serraine, are faenare (birdmen able to create spell-like effects through songs), gnomes, gremlins, harpies, nagpa (vulture-headed humanoids), pegataurs (winged centaurs), sphinxes, and tabi (catlike creatures). Each of these races is introduced by a character who describes their cultures, evolution, and lifestyles. Some creatures start with negative experience points totals when used as PCs.

There are three adventures for characters of various experience point levels. The first contains a basilisk that must be defeated by the PCs. The longest adventure is for characters of levels 7–11, and is set within the flying city. The opening stages require a fair bit of detective work from the PCs, and after the investigation in the city, the PCs chase the villain through the air in one of the planes.

== Publication history ==
PC2 Top Ballista was written by Carl Sargent and published by TSR in 1989. The package included a sixty-four page booklet, a thirty-two page adventure booklet, a full-color map of the city, and a two-panel card cover. Editing was by Jennell Jaquays (Note: Credited as Paul Jaquays.), with cover and interior illustrations by John Lakey.

== Reception ==
Jim Bambra reviewed Top Ballista for Dragon magazine #164 (December 1990). He felt that the text describing the races of Serraine is "presented in a cheerful and illuminating manner that captures the flavor of the city and its inhabitants nicely". Bambra examined the product's game mechanics and found numerous flaws which "ruin what is in many ways a fine product", with the mechanics "showing signs of not having been designed or edited very thoroughly", and while he felt that some areas are "markedly better than others", Bambra concluded that "I found enough mistakes and poorly considered areas to give me cause for concern". He pointed out the poorly balanced character level advancement (with nagpa and sphinx PCs in particular progressing very slowly compared to other characters), inconsistencies between tables and references in the text, redundant charm abilities for harpies, and other problems. Despite this, he felt the sky gnomes and their ability to build machines using fantasy physics are handled well, called the faenare "a finely detailed race with nifty powers", complimented the city as "neatly described", and said, "the plane rules look like they'll work". He felt that the visual presentation is of high quality, calling the illustrations of the four planes "excellent", and noting that the interior artwork "captures the humorous flavor of the product well", although he added that some of the races had no illustrations, pointing out that the single nagpa illustration is not near its entry. Bambra concluded by saying: "Top Ballista suffers from a large number of design flaws, which is a pity as it has some great ideas and well-written descriptive passages. The background sections are generally very good, making it a fun and unusual adventure setting. Viewed as a source of background information, Top Ballista is useful, but its failure to provide balanced PC creatures weakens it greatly. This one is for completists only."
