= Tyler Jacobson =

American artist

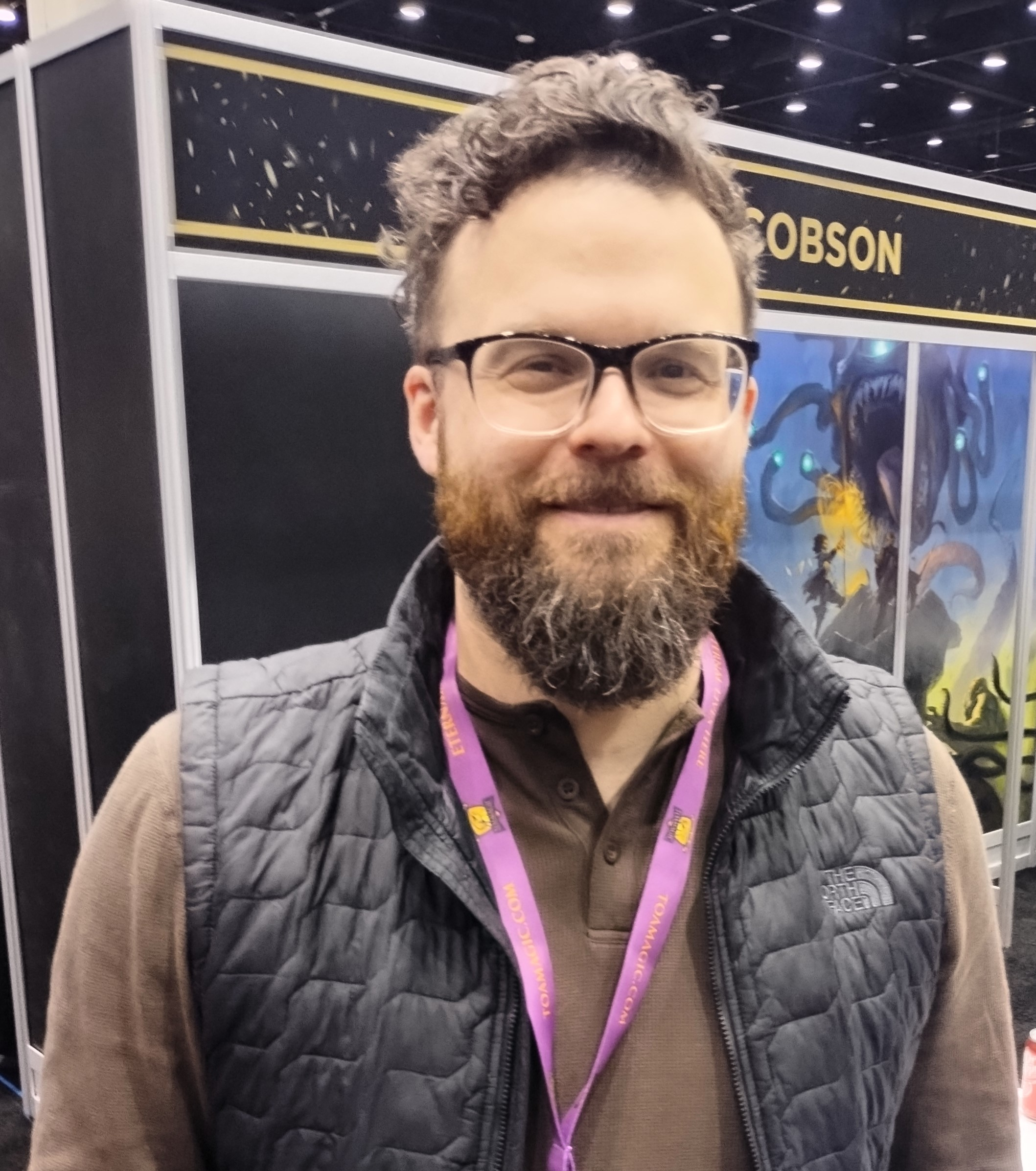
- Jacobson at Chicago MagicCon in 2025
- Born: Oakland, California
- Known for: Fantasy art, illustration
- Spouse: Kate Welch
- Website: http://tylerjacobsonart.com/ http://tylerjacobson.blogspot.com/

Tyler Jacobson is an American science fiction and fantasy artist and illustrator.

== Career ==
His work has been featured in publications by Wizards of the Coast, Simon & Schuster, TOR, Entertainment Weekly, Rolling Stone, Texas Monthly, Men’s Journal, Runner's World, The Weekly Standard, and Scientific American. He is also known as a mainstream artist for contributions to several popular publications, including the oil painting Last Days of The Comanches featured in Texas Monthly.

Jacobson is best known as a fantasy artist, due to his significant contributions of art to Magic: The Gathering trading card game cards, package art, and promotional materials, as well as character design and game art for Dungeons & Dragons. By April 2020, he had "illustrated nearly 100 cards" for Magic: The Gathering. Jacobson occsionally auctions off his Magic: The Gathering original work; his painting of Drizzt Do'Urden for the Adventures in the Forgotten Realms set "sold for a record-breaking $155,000" and "falls in the Top 5 highest public prices realized for an original work of Magic art".

He was the cover artist for two of the core rulebooks – Player's Handbook (2014) and Dungeon Master's Guide (2014) – for the 5th Edition of Dungeons & Dragons. Jacobson designed the standard edition cover for the 5th Edition adventure module The Wild Beyond the Witchlight (2021). SyFy Wire highlighted that "the cover for The Wild Beyond the Witchlight promises an ominous carnival atmosphere with a creepy clown and a looming, imposing-looking enforcer-type character". He also designed the covers for that edition's revised Player's Handbook (2024), Dungeon Master's Guide (2024), and Monster Manual (2024). In comparing the cover of the 2024 Player's Handbook to the 2014 Player's Handbook, Matt Bassil of Wargamer commented that "the old cover is an obvious power fantasy: look how powerful you can become and the cool things you can fight" while the new cover has a different focus: "look at the variety of DnD races and classes you can play, and the cool people you'll be hanging out with". Benjamin Abbott of GamesRadar+ called the Monster Manual (2024) "hands down my favorite cover out of the new core rulebooks".

Jacobson is the art director for Matthew Lillard's "Quest's End" whiskey line where he does bottle art and design including the map on the back of each bottle; he also illustrates the corresponding chapter of the original fantasy story, Dawn of the Unbound Gods by Kate Welch, which comes with the bottle.

== Education ==
Jacobson graduated from Gonzaga University in 2005 with a BA in Fine Art, and from the Academy of Art University in San Francisco in 2009 with a MFA in Illustration and was awarded Best of Show MFA Traditional Illustration AAU Spring Show 2009, and First Place MFA Traditional Illustration AAU Spring Show 2009.

== Awards ==
- 2010 Jack Gaughan Award for Best Emerging Artist
- 2012 Spectrum 19 Gold Winner: Advertising for Talon of Umberlee.
