= Half-elf (Dungeons & Dragons) =

Fictional humanoid race in the Dungeons & Dragons franchise

- Dungeons & Dragons race
- First appearance: Greyhawk (1975); Monster Manual (1977); Player's Handbook (1978)
- Last appearance: Player's Handbook (2014)
- Created by: Gary Gygax
- Based on: Half-elf
- Genre: Role-playing game

In-universe information
- Type: Humanoid
- Alignment: Any
- Notable members: Tanis Half-Elven

The half-elf is a humanoid race in the Dungeons & Dragons fantasy role-playing game, one of the primary races available for player characters, and play a central role in the narratives of many setting worlds of the game. As the offspring of humans and elves, they are known as "half-elves" among humans and in sourcebooks, and as "half-humans" among elves.

== Creative influences ==
Gary Gygax originally claimed Dungeons & Dragons elves draw very little from J. R. R. Tolkien's version of the elf. However, multiple academics have argued that aspects of elves and half-elves in Dungeons & Dragons are directly traceable to Tolkien's portrayal. Alluding to a 1977 cease-and-desist order, Wired wrote that "D&D cocreator Gary Gygax's nods toward fantasy forefather Tolkien—including elves, dwarves, halflings (hobbits), and orcs—were so obvious that Tolkien Enterprises threatened to take copyright action." And in 2000, reports the Strong National Museum of Play, Gygax "stated that the Tolkien works had a 'strong impact' on the development of Dungeons & Dragons". Aardy R. DeVarque observed that while D&D's half-elves are inspired by the character of Elrond, they are distinct in being "a true amalgamation of elves and men" rather than choosing between those lineages.

Michael J. Tresca, in the book The Evolution of Fantasy Role-Playing Games (2014), wrote that before Tolkien's work, "the most modern depiction of elves that would influence the fantasy genre was Lord Dunsany's novel The King of Elfland's Daughter (1924)" which "firmly establishes that elves can breed with humans (more echoes of half-elves)" and "elven women in particular as something to be greatly desired by human men".

== Publication history ==
=== Original Dungeons & Dragons ===
The half-elf first appeared as a player character race in the Greyhawk supplement to the original 1974 edition of Dungeons & Dragons.

=== Advanced Dungeons & Dragons 1st edition ===
The half-elf appeared as a player character race in the original Player's Handbook (1978). The half-elf also appeared in the original Monster Manual (1977). The half-elves of the Dragonlance setting were detailed in Dragonlance Adventures (1987).

=== Advanced Dungeons & Dragons 2nd edition ===
The half-elf appeared as a character race in the second edition Player's Handbook (1989). The half-elf also appeared in the Monstrous Compendium Volume One (1989), and Monstrous Manual (1993). Options for the half-elf character race were presented in Player's Option: Skills & Powers (1995). The planar half-elf for the Planescape setting was detailed in The Planewalker's Handbook (1996). The half-breed aquatic elf for the Forgotten Realms setting appeared in Sea of Fallen Stars (1999).

=== Dungeons & Dragons 3rd edition ===
The half-elf appeared as a character race in the third edition Player's Handbook (2000), and Monster Manual (2000), and in the 3.5 revised Player's Handbook and Monster Manual (2003). The half-human elf was presented in the 3.5 revised Dungeon Master's Guide (2003). Half-elves, including half-aquatic elf and half-drow, were detailed for the Forgotten Realms setting in Races of Faerûn (2003). The aquatic half-elf, the arctic half-elf, the desert half-elf, the fire half-elf, the jungle half-elf, and the half-elf paragon were detailed in Unearthed Arcana (2004).

Half-elves in the Eberron campaign setting are also known as the khoravar. The madborn half-elf of the Eberron setting appeared in Five Nations (2005). The aquatic half-elf appeared again in Stormwrack (2005). The deepwyrm half-drow appeared in Dragon Magic (2006).

=== Dungeons & Dragons 4th edition ===
The half-elf appeared as a character race in the fourth edition Player's Handbook (2008) and the Essentials rulebook Heroes of the Forgotten Kingdoms (2010). They were also featured in the March 2010 article "Winning Races: Half-Elves" in the magazine Dragon #385.

=== Dungeons & Dragons 5th edition ===
The half-elf appeared as a character race in the fifth edition Player's Handbook (2014); the half-elf and half-orc were the only two supported mixed ancestries in the core rulebook. Tasha's Cauldron of Everything (2020) included updated options for player character races – in the Player's Handbook, the half-elf received an automatic bonus to the Charisma ability while Tasha's included the option to decouple pre-determined ability scores from race choice. The edition also includes variant options with different mechanical benefits depending on the specific elven ancestry, such as aquatic, drow, high-elf, or wood-elf. In August 2022, Wizards of the Coast launched the One D&D public playtest to update Dungeons & Dragons. The first playtest document removed the option of distinct rules for half-elves and half-orcs and replaced it with rules for mixed parentage where a player selects mechanical traits from one parent's race and has the choice of how their character visually appears with characteristics of both parents.

The Player's Handbook (2024), as part of the 2024 revision to the 5th Edition ruleset, does not include rules for species (previously described as races) with mixed ancestry; however, the designers noted this revision to the core rules is backward compatible so players have the option of adapting the 2014 rules for half-elves and half-orcs. On this shift in design, lead designer Jeremy Crawford commented, "frankly, we are not comfortable, and haven't been for years with any of the options that start with 'half'. The half construction is inherently racist so we simply aren't going to include it in the new Player's Handbook". The setting sourcebook Eberron: Forge of the Artificer (2025) introduces the khoravar as a new species choice. On adding khoravar to 5th Edition, Crawford stated, "we are actually embracing Eberron's own lore by getting at the fact that the khoravar [...] have always objected to being called half-elves".

== Fictional description ==
Half-elves, as their name implies, are the offspring of humans and elves. Half-elves are a subrace unto themselves, blending the features of human and elf. Half-elves look like elves to humans and like humans to elves (hence their elven description as "half-human"). They do well with elves, humans, gnomes, dwarves, and halflings, a social ease reflected in racial bonuses to the Diplomacy and Gather Information skills. In the case of conflicts between elves and humans, however, each side suspects a half-elf mediator of favoring the other. The drow despise them, referring to them as 'Mongrel half breeds'.

Half-Elves have curiosity and ambitions like humans but they have sense for magic and love for nature like their elven parents. Their skin is paler than human skin and they are taller and bigger than elves. Half-Elves have long ears like elves. They live about 180 years.

=== Campaign settings ===
The main character of the initial Dragonlance series, Tanis Half-Elven, is a half-elf, as his name implies.

In the Eberron campaign setting, half-elves (also known as khoravar) consider themselves a separate people from humans and elves both and "breed true"; they bear the dragonmarks of Storm and Detection. Wargamer highlighted that "the Khoravar are technically distinct from the Half-Elves of the Forgotten Realms setting. They were apparently originally descended from humans and elves, but they evolved to become a species of their own".

== Reception ==
Gus Wezerek, for FiveThirtyEight, reported that of the 5th Edition "class and race combinations per 100,000 characters that players created on D&D Beyond from" August 15 to September 15, 2017, half-elves were the third most created at 10,454 total, preceded by elves (16,443) and humans (25,248). The three most popular class combinations with the half-elf were bard (1,808), warlock (1,401) and rogue (1,325). Wezerek noted "some of the common character choices can be explained by the game's structure of racial bonuses". Josh Williams of Screen Rant stated that "half-elves are popular because they're a great choice for those wanting to play as a fantasy race without stepping too far away from humanity". Williams commented that "half-elves struggle to fit in" when growing up but "thanks to being born of two worlds, half-elves are perfect for players wishing to be the charismatic diplomat of the group".

Academics Samuel Heine and Antoine Prémont, in 2021 at the International Conference on the Foundations of Digital Games, noted that there is "no clear consistency" in the description of half-elves from edition to edition, however, a pattern emerges in the types of mechanical benefits half-elves receive "where half-elves slowly gain some form of choices" similar to humans while gaining "biological traits inherent to their elven lineage". They highlighted that in Advanced Dungeons & Dragons 1st and 2nd editions, elves had a 90% chance to resist certain spells, whereas half-elves had a 30% chance; "inversely, some traits of elven parentage" are fully inherited and half-elves have a broader range of class options, similar but not to the same extent as humans. Heine and Premont note that subsequent editions exemplify the notions established in the game's origins with less essentialism and more determinism – in the 3rd Edition, half-elves receive only "half bonuses to their senses" compared to elves but are regarded as "full elves" for special abilities and effects. While they lack the complete flexibility of humans in skill and feat choices, they are not limited by a specific favored class. In the 4th Edition, half-elves benefit from small bonuses inherited from both parents and can gain abilities that are typically exclusive to humans or elves. The 5th Edition further integrates aspects of choice, allowing for variations in skills and core attributes alongside unique "biological traits, namely the 'fey ancestry' ability describing their peculiar lineage".

Heine and Premont also commented that the way in which Dungeons & Dragon presents half-elves is very different from the other half-human choice, the half-orc; while half-elves often seek to find their place as outsiders and become "a race of leaders, ambassadors and social butterflies", half-orcs tend to embody a more uncivilized, barbaric nature with a struggle to rein in their inner violence and have less adaptability than half-elves. In 2023, Benjamin Carpenter argued in the Howard Journal of Communications that the fictional racial categories in Dungeons & Dragons enables the spread of racial and racist ideologies by subtly introducing "racial conceptual frameworks". Carpenter opined that by explicitly incorporating "halfway-between racial categories", Dungeons & Dragons implies that a blend "of elven or orc blood with human (for human is always the referent of the unspecified 'half') constitutes something wholly distinct from its parent races" and this notion reinforces the boundaries of the "pure" and "unmixed" races, thereby supporting "a doctrine of racial difference". Carpenter highlighted that the half-elf and half-orc reflect the "hegemonic center" of humanity, "the norm from which all other races deviate", in the game and these half-human races "do not operate identically due to the differential moral understanding of elves and orcs". Unlike the half-orc, the half-elf does not originate from any monstrous races and their description stresses this race's "fluidity, flexibility, and adaptability" while the description of the half-orc stresses barbarism and inherited rage from the monstrous orc parent – both are considered half-human but half-orcs are "understood as tainted by their orc parent" while "half-elves can cross the boundaries of their parent races, with this becoming a dignified strength".

Matthew Byrd, for Den of Geek in 2023, highlighted that both half-elves and half-orcs have "stats/attributes" reflective of two races which "offered some unique role-playing options" and that the half-elf mechanically "benefited from a pretty generous base stat distribution and useful base skills". Byrd commented that these races "are notable for being specifically outlined during the character creation process in many versions of the game", however, Dungeons & Dragons is moving away from having these two as distinct races. Byrd thought that this development might "address some potential balancing issues" since the half-elf race has "long been a pretty powerful character creation option". He also highlighted that this reflects "complaints/problems" about these two races being distinct while other mixed ancestries are not and that this is a holdover from the early game lifting design concepts by J. R. R. Tolkien, who mentioned these two "as separate races". Byrd opined that while Crawford's comments drew "a lot of heat", the shift "seems to be based on statistical and character creation balancing changes as much as (if not more than) concerns over the social implications of those older designs". Steven Holmes, in the academic journal Mythlore in 2023, also noted the shift by Wizards of the Coast away from using half races in Dungeons & Dragons. Holmes argued that this change occurred because half races "reinforced two related compounding problems" – one was that "those racial constructions implied 'human' as a default race" which is "deeply rooted in the origins of the game" and the other is that the artistic portrayal of humans "in the core handbooks for the first four editions of the game almost exclusively showed light-skinned human characters, which reinforced the sense that there was an association of the human race in Dungeons & Dragons with whiteness". Homes believed that part of the current revisions "applied to race, half races, and the drow" are a reflection of the "longstanding tensions in gaming spaces. They also reflect the extent to which audience approaches toward narrative subjects change over time".

Eric Law, for Game Rant in 2023, explained that this change in design "incensed" part of the fan base with some players arguing that it "erases representation for real-life players of mixed heritage". Law also noted that some players are "not satisfied with" proposed rule changes in the August 2022 One D&D playtest document and that "while assigning special stats to mixed heritage characters was always a little strange," the playtest alternative where players choose a single parent "to determine traits feels wrong, especially since Dungeons and Dragons is trying to be more racially-sensitive. These fans think doing so erases the impact of their character's heritage, and undermines the spirit and importance of what coming from multiple ethnicities means for both real and fictional people". Jenny Melzer of CBR also noted how this change was considered controversial but argued that this design shift by Wizards of the Coast "will actually improve gameplay options while moving the game forward in its quest for greater inclusivity" and that it "opens things up for cultural blending across all species in the game, no longer limiting it to orcs and elves".
