= City of Sorcerers =

1983 board game

City of Sorcerers is a 1983 board game published by Standard Games and Publications.

== Gameplay ==
City of Sorcerers is a fantasy boardgame in which the players are apprentice wizards trying to gather enough power to get to the Sorcerers' Arena where they will be able to confirm their status of sorcerer.

== Reception ==
Allen Varney reviewed City of Sorcerers in Space Gamer No. 71. Varney commented that "City of Sorcerers can be fascinating at times, and is often at least enjoyable. What we have here is a highly uneven design with considerable replay value: If one game doesn't turn out well, try again and it's bound to be different. It has lots of flavor and tries things I've never seen in other games. A qualified recommendation."

Robert Hulston reviewed City of Sorcerers for Imagine magazine, and stated that "Unfortunately, though fast -moving. Quite fun, and easily finishable in under three hours. City of Sorcerers suffers from poorly written rules. They are too brief and consequently flawed."
