= Races of Faerûn =

Dungeons & Dragons supplemental sourcebook

- Genre: Role-playing game
- Published: 2003 (Wizards of the Coast)
- Media type: Print

Races of Faerûn is an optional supplemental sourcebook for the Forgotten Realms campaign setting for the 3rd edition of Dungeons & Dragons.

== Contents ==
Races of Faerûn centers on the races which inhabit Faerûn, the fictional continent where most of the Forgotten Realms setting is set, giving detailed information on the histories of the races in the Realms, their languages, clothing, relations to other races, culture and so on. And also, much to the delight of players, it gave detailed information on how to play the races as characters. Races explored were the major races dwarves, elves, gnomes, half-elves, half-orc, halflings, humans, and planetouched, as well as minor races, aarakocra, centaurs, goblinoids, kir-lanan, lizardfolk, lycanthropes, shades, wemics, and yuan-ti, and the various subraces (in the case of humans, ethnic groups) of each of the races.

A handful of new feats, spells, magic items, prestige classes, and monsters are also given.

== Publication history ==
Races of Faerûn was designed by Eric L. Boyd, James Jacobs, and Matt Forbeck, and published in March 2003. Cover art is by Greg Staples, with interior art by Dennis Calero, Dennis Cramer, Mike Dutton, Wayne England, Jeremy Jarvis, Vince Locke, David Martin, Raven Mimura, Jim Pavelec, Vinod Rams, and Adam Rex.

Eric Boyd explained that for this project, "Rich Baker assigned individual races to each designer. [...] The project was then given a unified look and feel by the in-house design staff to resolve any differences among our approaches." Matt Forbeck noted that, as a freelancer, "I had absolutely no contact with my co-writers. I dealt exclusively with Sean Reynolds and Rich Baker instead, and they drew up the book's outline and parceled out the individual pieces. Although I don't normally like books written by many isolated people, the structure of this book actually leant itself to that kind of approach." James Jacobs explained that he "came in at pretty much the tail end of the design process to work on two chapters (elves and orcs), so I ended up designing in my own little bubble. I'd turn in my work to Sean Reynolds, and he'd go through it and fix all the stuff that was broken (or more often, make some suggestions to me on how to fix them), and then I'd go over it again. Once everyone had their pieces of the book all done, R&D got to go through and make sure that the pieces all fit together nicely."

== Reception ==
In May 2003, Races of Faerûn landed on the Amazon.ca bestseller list at number 42.

In June 2021, D&D Beyond criticized the book's approach to diversity in a blog post, writing, "Books such as third edition's Races of Faerun went through great pains to detail the myriad of human ethnicities. Unfortunately, concepts like inclusivity and sensitivity weren't the priority when they were written."

== Reviews ==
- Black Gate #6
- Backstab #47
- Dragão Brasil
