= Calamity (board game) =

Board game released in 1983

Calamity is a board game released by Games Workshop in 1983.

== Development ==
The game was co-designed by Andrew Lloyd Webber, along with Ian Livingstone and Derek Carver, and patterned after the world of high-risk insurance.

== Gameplay ==
It features a standard Monopoly-style playing track, although players complete the track only once per game.

== Reception ==
J C Connor reviewed Calamity! for Imagine magazine, and stated that "This is an easy game to learn but requires skill and experience to win in a convincing fashion."
