= Dark Cults =

Horror-themed card game

Contents of game including decks of cards, instructions, and front cover

Dark Cults is a two-player horror card game designed by Kenneth Rahman and published by Dark House in 1983.

== Publication history ==
The original game in 1983 was published with:

- 108 cards divided into
  - Story cards with ten themes (Locality, Neutral Character, Escape, Evil Character, Danger, End, Start, Save, Atmosphere, Threat). Each Story card also contains a short piece of narrative that players can use to inspire their own story-telling. For example, one card reads, "Inside, Wallace found himself face-to-face with a once friendly acquaintance."
  - and Pace cards (usually with one word or phrase printed on them such as Unexpectedly, Just As, Afterward, etc.)
- a sheet of rules
- a plastic ziplock bag

In 1985, a 16-page magazine was added that included rules for 4 players in two teams; rules for solitaire play; supplementary cards; and a sample character sheet.

== Gameplay ==
Two players vie over the fate of a fictional character. One of the players takes the role of "Life" while the other plays as "Death".

The players first choose who will play which role, Life or Death. Life gets more points for playing Locality, Neutral Character, and Escape cards; Death gets more points for Evil Character, Danger, and End cards. Both players receive the same number of points for playing Start, Save, Atmosphere, and Threat cards.

The players draw one Story card each from the deck and then work together to invent a fictional character and background. Once the character has been created, Life draws another Story card, and then can either lay down one Story card on the table, tallying points for it; or pass on the opportunity to play. If Life plays a card, the player creates a narrative about the fictional character in keeping with the card played. Death then draws a Story card and can either play a card or pass, adding to the narrative story if a card is played. Play alternates between the two.

Each Story card has a symbol indicating what types of Story cards can be played after it. For example, the Story card quoted above about Wallace meeting a former friend can only be followed by an Escape card or a Death card.

Players who cannot play a legal card after drawing from the Story deck must pass, increasing the number of cards in their hand by one. A player can also pass in order not to play a card that would be advantageous to the other player. A player can only hold a maximum of five cards. If, due to several instances of passing, a player's hand grows to 6 cards, the player is penalized 3 points, and then discards any number of cards. Players also have an opportunity to discard any number of cards at the end of each story segment, when the protagonist escapes, is killed or is saved.

Some Story cards have a symbol indicating that the next player must play a card from their hand before drawing a card from the Story deck. If the player is unable to play a legal card or has no Story cards, the player draws and plays a Pace card, which awards no points to either player.

The game ends when the Story card deck is exhausted. If the protagonist is killed before the deck is exhausted, the players make up another fictional character and continue with the game. The player who has tallied the most points when the Story deck is exhausted is the winner.

== Reception ==
In the Jan-Feb 1985 edition of Space Gamer (Issue No. 72) Frederick Paul Kiesche III and Warren Spector liked the game, saying, "Dark Cults gets the highest recommendation. It is quite addictive, and can be used as inspiration for horror RPG scenarios. [...] Dark Cults isn't going to be everyone's cup of tea, but if you're a budding writer, or a roleplayer who enjoys the roles as much as the playing, or if you're just a lover of ghost stories, Dark Cults may be what the doctor ordered. Just don't play it in the dark."

In the April 1989 issue of Games International (Issue #4), Paul Mason calls this "like no card game you ever played before." Mason believed that the great strength of the game lay not in the play of cards but in the narrative aspect, calling the points scoring "merely a sideshow to the main attraction." He did warn that the story-telling aspect would appeal to some and not others, saying, "It's certainly not one for the gamer who likes the anonymity of burying himself in piles of rules [...] You'll like the game in direct proportion to the extent you like exercising your imagination." He concluded by giving the game an above-average rating of 4 out of 5.

In the April 1994 edition of Dragon (Issue 204), Lester Smith considered the game "worthy of attention", although he disliked the name Dark Cults since it "doesn’t really have much of anything to do with cults." Smith's only criticism of the game was that the story never ended on a satisfactory note since the game abruptly ended when the Story deck was exhausted. But he concluded by giving the game an above average rating of 5 out of 6, saying, "That is a relatively minor complaint to make, considering how much fun the game is overall."
