= Elf (Dungeons & Dragons) =

Fictional humanoid race

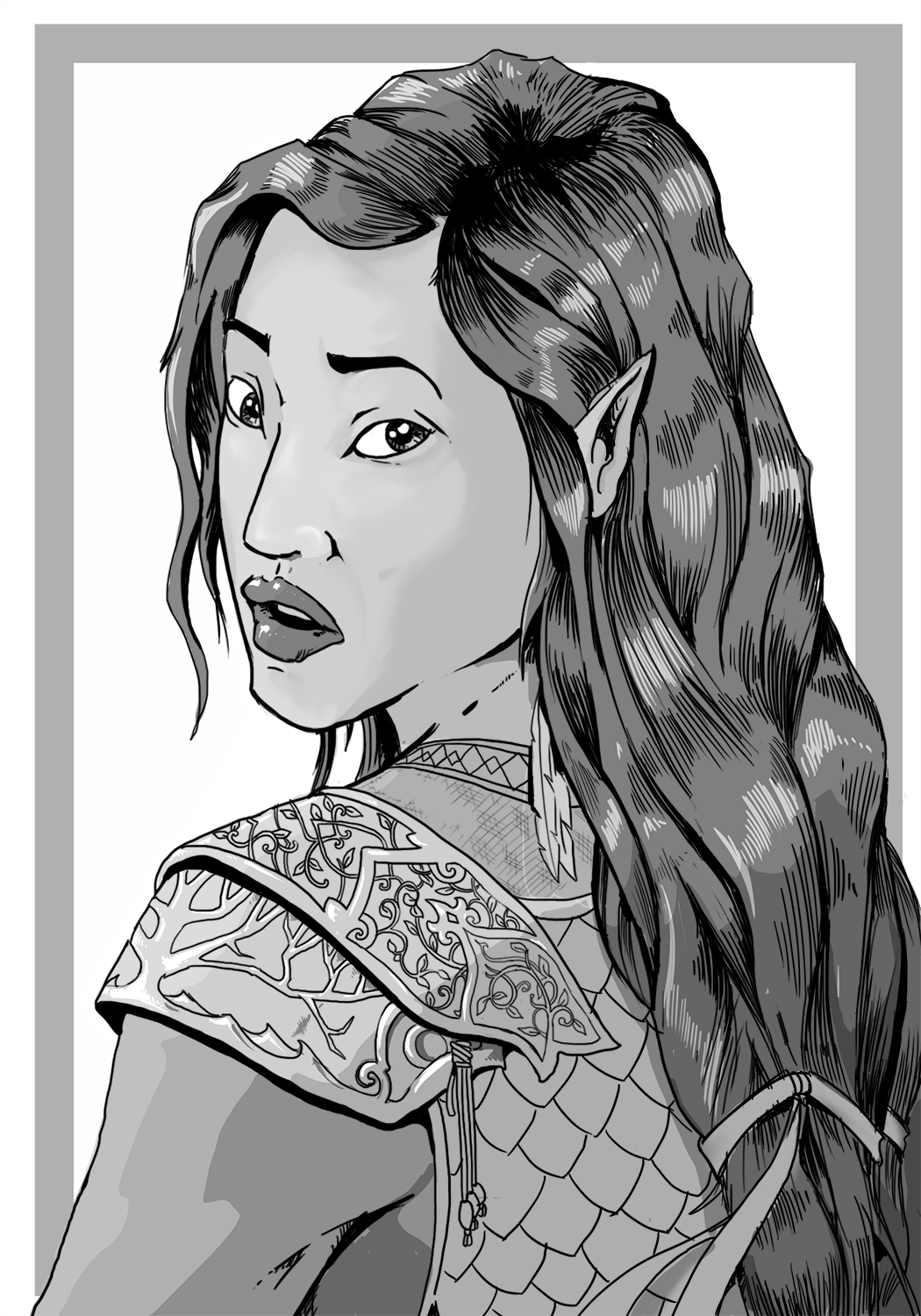
- First appearance: 1974 edition of Dungeons & Dragons
- Based on: Elf

In-universe information
- Type: Humanoid
- Alignment: Any

The elf is a humanoid race in the Dungeons & Dragons fantasy role-playing game, one of the primary races available for player characters, and play a central role in the narratives of many setting worlds of the game. Elves are described as renowned for their grace and mastery of magic and weapons such as the bow and sword. Becoming physically mature by the age of 25 and emotionally mature at around 125, they are also famously long-lived, capable of living more than half a millennium and remaining physically youthful. Possessed of innate beauty and easy gracefulness, they are viewed as both wondrous and haughty by other races in-universe; however, their natural detachment is seen by some as introversion or xenophobia. They were usually portrayed as antagonistic towards dwarves.

There are numerous different subraces and subcultures of elves, including aquatic elves, dark elves (drow), deep elves (rockseer), grey elves, high elves, moon elves, snow elves, sun elves, valley elves, wild elves (grugach), wood elves and winged elves (avariel). The offspring of humans and elves are known as "half-elves" among humans and in sourcebooks, and as "half-humans" among elves.

== Creative influences ==
Gary Gygax claimed Dungeons & Dragons elves draw very little from Tolkien's version of the elf. However, academic Philip J. Clements sees certain aspects as directly traceable to Tolkien's portrayal. Similarly, academic Philippe Bornet in "Religions in play: games, rituals, and virtual worlds" said that elves in the game are based on Tolkien's version of the elf. Michael J. Tresca, in the book The Evolution of Fantasy Role-Playing Games (2014), stated the elven sub-types in Dungeons & Dragons can be traced to divided lines of Tolkien's elves—Noldor become high elves, Tawarwaith become wood elves and Sindar become grey elves in the game.

== Publication history ==
=== Original Dungeons & Dragons ===
The elf first appeared as a player character race in the original 1974 edition of Dungeons & Dragons. The aquatic elf was introduced in the 1975 Blackmoor supplement. Elves in Dungeons & Dragons are immune to paralysis as a holdover from a game balance adjustment in Chainmail. Players with elf characters could choose either the "fighting-man" or "magic-user" class to start with; multiclassing was allowed, however, elf characters could only take a max of four levels in fighter and eight levels in magic-user. Tresca described the Tolkien style of elf as "a burden for game designers" as they were seemingly "more capable than humans". Tresca commented that "Gygax worked hard to curb their power, by giving the race a weak constitution and putting limitations on how high they could level. These limitations would not be removed until the third edition of Dungeons & Dragons".

=== Advanced Dungeons & Dragons 1st edition ===
The elf appeared as a player character race in the original Player's Handbook (1978). The elf also appeared in the original Monster Manual (1977), with subraces including High Elf, Gray Elf (some of whom are also called Faerie), Dark Elf (also called Drow), Wood Elf (also called Sylvan), and Aquatic Elf. The grugach, valley elf, and cooshee (an elven dog) first appeared in Dragon issue #67 (November 1982) in "Featured Creatures", an ongoing series of articles where Gary Gygax released information on official creatures before their release in the upcoming Monster Manual II. The grugach, valley elf, and cooshee then appeared in the original Monster Manual II (1983). A number of elven subraces were presented as character races in the original Unearthed Arcana (1985).

=== Basic Dungeons & Dragons ===
The elf appeared as a character race in the Dungeons & Dragons Basic Set (1977). In subsequent revisions, in order to streamline the game, the non-humans (including the elf) were presented as distinct classes. The elf class is often seen as a blend of the fighter and magic-user classes.

The Shadow elf appears as a character race in GAZ13 The Shadow Elves published by TSR in 1990 as a 64-page booklet and a 32-page booklet.

=== Advanced Dungeons & Dragons 2nd edition ===
The high elf appeared as a character race in the second edition Player's Handbook (1989). The high elf also appeared in the Monstrous Compendium Volume One (1989). Several elven races were detailed as player character races in The Complete Book of Elves (1992). Supplements focused on elves in specific campaign settings include Comanthor: Empire of the Elves, Elves of Evermeet and Elves of Athas.

=== Dungeons & Dragons 3rd edition ===
The elf appeared as a character race in the third edition Player's Handbook (2000), and in the 3.5 revised Player's Handbook. Elves were detailed for the Forgotten Realms setting in Races of Faerûn (2003). Elves were one of the races detailed in Races of the Wild (2005).

=== Dungeons & Dragons 4th edition ===
The elf appeared as a character race and as one of three in a family of elven races—the sylvans, the drows, and the eladrins—in the fourth edition Player's Handbook (2008). This version of the elf returns in the Essentials rulebook Heroes of the Fallen Lands (2010). The elf appears in the fourth edition Monster Manual (2008).

Tresca explained that this edition allowed elves and humans to be equal in height and "deemphasized their low constitution, a balancing attribute created for earlier editions". Tresca opined that the introduction of eladrin "restored elves in Dungeons & Dragons to the mysterious, sometimes dangerous, and altogether powerful status they enjoyed in Middle-earth".

=== Dungeons & Dragons 5th edition ===
The elf was included as a player race in the 5th edition Player's Handbook (2014). Three subraces were introduced with it: the high elf, the wood elf, and the drow (dark elf). The Player's Handbook connects the high elves to the gray elves and valley elves of the Greyhawk setting, the Silvanesti and Qualinesti of the Dragonlance setting, and the sun elves and moon elves of the Forgotten Realms setting. They also connect the wood elves to the wild elves (grugach) of Greyhawk and the Kagonesti of Dragonlance.

The 5th edition Dungeon Master's Guide (2014) also presented the eladrin (which appeared in 4th edition as a separate but related race) as an elf subrace, using them as an example for creating a new character subrace. The eladrin later appeared as Unearthed Arcana playtest content in "Race Options: Eladrin and Gith" (2017). Avariel, grugach, sea elves, and shadar-kai were presented as playtest options in "Elf Subraces" (2017). Eladrin, shadar-kai, and sea elves were then featured as playable subraces for elves in the supplement Mordenkainen's Tome of Foes (2018). Those three subraces were then revised in Mordenkainen Presents: Monsters of the Multiverse (2022).

In December 2022, Wizards of the Coast announced that the word "race" would no longer be used to refer to a character's biological traits and instead would be replaced with the word "species"; this change went into effect with the December One D&D playtest release. The Player's Handbook (2024), as part of the 2024 revision to the 5th Edition ruleset, updated the elf as a player species choice. The elf now has lineage options for drow, high elf, and wood elf. Connor Lindsay of Screen Rant explained that mechanically the updated elf is focused "more on the species' innate magical connections" and grants each lineage "a selection of spells they can cast as they level up" along with each lineage receiving "its own passive features". Lindsay noted that elves "retain a lot of their old features, keeping Trance, darkvision proficiency, and Fey Ancestry, and get a wider selection for their extra proficiency".

== Fictional characteristics ==
=== Spirit vs soul ===
In early editions of Dungeons & Dragons, elves had spirits instead of souls which impacted some game mechanics such as various resurrection spells. This distinction was dropped in the 3rd Edition. Christian Hoffer of ComicBook.com commented that "while there are lots of theories about the technical reasons (many believe that D&D co-creator Gary Gygax was not a fan of non-human characters, and thus placed the restriction on them when writing up Advanced Dungeons & Dragons), the only 'official' explanation appears in Deities & Demigods, a D&D supplement released in 1980. [...] The major difference between a soul and a spirit is that souls live one life on the Material Plane and then spend eternity in whatever plane their chosen deity resides, while spirits are eventually reincarnated back into the Material Plane."

=== Religion ===
In several campaign settings, elves have their own pantheon often known as the Seldarine; this pantheon usually consists of the leader Corellon Larethian, as well as Aerdrie Faenya, Deep Sashelas, Erevan Ilesere, Fenmarel Mestarine, Hanali Celanil, Labelas Enoreth, Rillifane Rallathil, Sehanine Moonbow, and Solonor Thelandira. Other elven gods may be present in different campaign settings.

=== Half-elves ===
Half-elves are the offspring of humans and elves. They look like elves to humans and like humans to elves. Half-Elves have curiosity and ambitions like humans but they have sense for magic and love for nature like their elven parents. Their skin is paler than human skin and they are taller and bigger than elves. Half-Elves have long ears like elves. They live about 180 years.

The half-elf appeared as a player character race in the original Player's Handbook (1978).

=== Other types of elves ===
Subraces of elves include Dark Elves and Deep elves.

==== Grey Elves ====
These elves are the most noble of elves, yet also the most arrogant. They are of higher intellectual capabilities than other elves, but, despite the fact that they are taller than high elves, they are physically weaker. They live in isolated mountain strongholds, and rarely allow access to outsiders. They have silver hair and amber eyes, or gold hair and violet eyes, and wear clothes of white, silver, yellow and gold, and usually wear regally colored cloaks.

==== Shadow Elves ====
These elves are an isolated race of elves that survived a cataclysm and adapted to live in caves in Mystara. The shadow elves are even paler than normal elves, with white hair and very clear eyes, usually a sparkling blue or gray color. The shadow elves are somewhat smaller and thinner than their surface cousins, standing about five feet tall and weighing about 100 pounds. Their ears are larger than those of wood elves, giving the shadow elves a sort of "walking radar" underground. Shadow elves have high-pitched voices—almost squeaky to human ears.

==== High Elves ====
High elves are the original eladrin and the original elves that came Abeir-Toril from the Feywild (dark, sun, moon, green, lythari and star elves), and most commonly encountered by other races, and the most open and friendly of their kind. They travel to other lands more than other elves. They are generally dark-haired and green-eyed, with very pale complexions the color of new cream. They simply do not tan, no matter how much time they spend under Oerth's sun. High elves prefer to wear light pastels, blues and greens and violets, and often dwell in homes built into living wood, high in the trees.

In 4th edition the Eladrin are the High elves.

==== Painted Elves ====
This subrace resides in painted deserts and petrified forests, preferring a druidic lifestyle.

==== Rockseer Elves or Deep Elves ====
"Rockseer elves are the rarest of all elvenkind. They are far taller than most of their kin, with a few reaching almost to eight feet in height. An average weight for a Rockseer is between 120 and 140 pounds, with little gender difference. Rockseers are very pale skinned, and they have no body hair. Head hair is extraordinarily fine, always worn long, with the appearance and texture of exquisitely fine silk. The hair is silver, and eye color is a pale, almost ice-blue. They are androgynous in appearance, making it difficult for outsiders to tell males and females apart.

"Rockseers have been separated from the rest of elvenkind since mythic times. Their own history tells that they were cowards at the great battle of Corellon Larethian and Lolth, fleeing the combat and taking refuge far below ground. They have no knowledge of surface elves. They know of the Drow and hate them, avoiding them whenever possible. They are extremely seclusive and shun the company of all other races, including the Svirfneblin. The only exception to this are pech, with whom Rockseers sometimes form friendships."

The deep elves are found in 1996's Monstrous Compendium Annual Volume Three, but originated in the Night Below boxed set campaign published in 1995. In a subplot of Night Below, the player characters can reintroduce the exiled Rockseers to the rest of elvenkind and reconcile them with their god, Corellon Larethian.

== Campaign settings ==
=== Greyhawk ===
The elves of Greyhawk include the standard aquatic, dark (Drow), grey, high, and wood (sylvan) elves described in the core rule books of various editions of the game.

Additional elven types created for this setting include the snow elves, valley elves, and wild (grugach) elves.

=== Dragonlance ===
The depiction of the elves in Dragonlance fiction is strongly influenced by Tolkien's elves. One of the major character types in the setting, they are presented as aloof and isolationist as a group, but also as caretakers of the natural world. Like in other settings, they are split into several peoples, again echoing the splits among Tolkien's elves: Silvanesti and Qualinesti, two races of high elves estranged from each other; the Kagonesti or Wild Elves; and two races of sea elves: the Dimernesti or Shoal Elves, which inhabit the coastal areas and the Dargonesti or Deep Elves.

=== Forgotten Realms ===
The various elven subraces are more prominent in the Forgotten Realms campaign setting, and Faerûn boasts several major subraces. They differ physically from typical Dungeons & Dragons elves in that they are as tall as humans (5′9″ on average), or even taller. The exception are the Drow, who are of standard D&D elven height. In Faerûn, surface elves call themselves Tel-Quessir which means "The People" in the elven language. In 4th edition, most of the elven subraces were classified into three broad families: drow, eladrin, or elves. In the 5th edition, these families were re-classified into four, with three being detailed in the primary campaign books: drow, high elves, and wood elves, with eladrin as their own lineage of elves whose ancestors never emigrated from the Faerie world to the Material world of Toril.

The history of the elven race as portrayed in this setting is marked by great empires and a gradual decline and retreat from the mainland Faerûn. The elves first came to Abeir-Toril from the plane of Faerie more than twenty-five millennia ago. The first wave of elves to arrive were the green elves, lythari, and avariel. The second wave included the dark elves, who arrived in the jungles of southern Faerûn, and the sun and moon elves, who arrived in the north. Not long after, the aquatic elves arrived in the Great Sea. After the second wave of elven immigrants arrived, the Time of Dragons ended and the period known as the First Flowering of the Fair Folk began. The elves settled into five major civilizations along the west and south of Faerûn during this period. Along the Sword Coast, the sun elves established Aryvandaar and Shantel Othreier, and the green elves established Illefarn, Miyeritar (along with the dark elves), and Keltormir. To the south, in present-day Vilhon Reach, the green elves also created the nations of Thearnytaar, Eiellûr, and Syòpiir. In the forests that once covered the Shaar, the moon elves established Orishaar, and the dark elves established Ilythiir and Miyeritar (along with the green elves). All of these realms were gradually destroyed as a result of the Crown Wars, which made way for other elven realms.

Their once expansive realms have shrunk back in territory and prestige due to the influence and expansion of the younger races, particularly humans. They remain influential, however; much of the shape of Faerûn is influenced by conflict between the various subraces of the elves.

The elven subraces of Faerûn include the following:

Aquatic Elves or Sea Elves (Alu-Tel'Quessir)
Aquatic elves are also known as sea elves. They live beneath the waves of Faerûn and can breathe water as easily as their cousins on land breathe air. They can also breathe air but for a very short period of time.

Avariel or Winged Elves (Aril-Tel'Quessir)
The avariel are very rare in Faerûn, since they have been hunted nearly to extinction by various dragons. Avariel remain in any number in only one place—the Aerie of the Snow Eagles, a secluded mountain home in the north. Avariel maintain good relationships with aarakocra, and those in the Aerie of the Snow Eagles have recently reestablished contact with their cousins in Evermeet. The avariel make their homes in open areas, and take immense joy in flying. They absolutely abhor and detest being inside, underground, or otherwise restricted from the open sky. The avariel are known for their fierce clerical tradition, as devout worshippers of the Seldarine sky goddess Aerdrie Faenya.

Drow
Once known only as dark elves, one of their greatest kingdoms was Illythiir. They were transformed into drow and banished to the Underdark when their matron goddess Lolth broke from the primary elven pantheon. Of all the elves they are the only ones portrayed as inherently evil and hate their cousins with an undying passion. They are smaller than their cousins, both shorter and thinner. In addition, their skin resembles polished obsidian, and their hair is snow-white or silver. Their eyes are almost inevitably red, gleaming with the hatred for their surface dwelling cousins. In 4th edition, the drow are a separate race rather than an elf subrace.

Dark Elves (Ssri-Tel'Quessir)
Recently returned into the fold of the true elven race. These former Drow now live on the surface in the city of hope. They have brown skin and black hair and have been cleansed of all drow traits. They are protected once again by Corellon Larethian.

Lythari (Ly-Tel'Quessir)
The lythari are a subrace of elves who can transform into wolves. Unlike most werewolves, they can transform at will and keep their minds while in wolf form. Because the lythari have changed so far from their elven roots, most Faerûnian scholars now consider them a separate race from elves. Lythari are devoted to Selune and their Ancestor Endymion, Father of the race and follower of Selune.

Moon Elves or Silver Elves (Teu-Tel'Quessir)
The moon elves are the most common of all the elves in Faerûn and are also known as silver elves. They typically have fair skin and hair that runs in hues from silver-white to black or blue. While human style hair colors are rare, eye color can be remarkably similar, with colors ranging from blue to green. The majority of the half-elves in Faerûn come from parings between humans and moon elves. In 4th edition, moon elves are eladrin.

Star Elves or Mithral Elves (Ruar-Tel'Quessir)
This subrace left the forests of Yuirwood for an extraplanar realm known as Sildëyuir. They have recently considered returning due to increasing threats by the alien nilshai.

Sun Elves or Gold Elves (Ar-Tel'Quessir)
Sun elves are primarily found upon the island of Evermeet and because of this, they are less common across the rest of Faerûn. With bronze colored skin; gold, black, or green eyes; and gold, blond, black, or (rarely) red hair, they are also called gold elves. Sun elves are less physically fit, but more intellectually advanced, than their counterparts. Sun elves are the primary practitioners of elven High Magic, and are among the greatest magic-users of Toril, both arcane and divine. In 4th edition, sun elves are eladrin.

Wild Elves or Green Elves (Sy-Tel'Quessir)
The most reclusive of all the elves, the wild elves pride themselves on their isolation and skill at keeping hidden. Their skin tends to be brown and they have similar colored hair which lightens with age. In 4th edition, wild elves are simply called elves, distinguishing them from the eladrin.

Wood Elves, Copper Elves, or Sylvan Elves (Or-Tel'Quessir)
Wood elves are a reclusive subrace, preferring to live in such areas as the High Forest. They place more emphasis on strength than learning. Wood elves are considered by other elven subraces (particularly the austere sun elves) to be boisterous and hedonistic. They have a zest for life and pleasure. According to Races of Faerûn (which was published in March 2003 and only mentions aquatic elves, avariel, drow, lythari, moon elves, sun elves, wood elves, and wild elves), wood elves are the only elven subrace that is native to Toril. They slowly formed for centuries from some of the other elven subraces after the last Crown War. They see their realms as the natural successors to past nations such as Eaerlann and Cormanthyr. In 4th edition, wood elves are simply called elves, distinguishing them from the eladrin.

Vil Adanrath
Lythari that have been separated and live in the Endless Wastes.

=== Eberron ===
Once the slaves of the giants of Xen'drik, the elves of Eberron are said to have immigrated over time to the continents of Aerenal and Khorvaire, establishing nations and distinct cultures on both. Most notable are the elves of Aerenal, whose culture revolves around the veneration of the Undying Court.

=== Dark Sun ===
In the post-apocalyptic setting of Athas, elves are nomadic desert runners rather than the more common image of forest-dwellers.

Athasian elves are portrayed as hostile nomads, marked by savage dispositions and a deep distrust of outsiders. An Athasian elf stands 6½–7½ feet tall. They are slender, lean, and generally in terrific physical condition. Their features are deeply etched into their weather-toughened faces, and their skin is made rough by the windblown sands and baking sun of the wilderness. The dunes and steppes of Athas are home to thousands of tribes of nomadic elves. While each tribe is very different culturally, the elves within them remain a race of long-limbed sprinters given to theft, raiding, and warfare.

The 2nd edition product Mind Lords of the Last Sea introduced a new offshoot of Dark Sun elf. The people of Saragar call them "ghost elves" for their fair complexions, light blonde hair and pale blue eyes. Ghost elves are elitist and xenophobic, and live almost exclusively in the city of Sylvandretta. To maintain a pure bloodline, they have inbred for millennia, resulting in their lighter appearance and halving their lifespan compared to other Athasian elves.

=== Birthright ===
The elves of Cerilia are known as the sidhelien and control various realms on the continent. While the Birthright Campaign Setting makes a clear difference in the rules between five Cerilian human cultures, such a distinction is not made for the elves. However, the elven realms have different attitudes towards their neighbours and other Cerilian inhabitants. Those ruled by Rhuobhe Manslayer, also called the Elf, are encouraged to hate humans, sometimes participating in the Gheallie Sidhe, the Hunt of the Elves, which set out to slaughter humans. Other realms set up magical barriers on their borders to prevent unwanted visitors.

The 2nd edition setting allows player characters to be elves or half-elves as adventurers but also as regents, giving them control of provinces, law holdings, guilds and magical sources. While humans have to be infused with a divine bloodline in order to cast true magic, the elves already have a connection to the land and can utilise the magical power of the land's mebhaighl without being blooded. However, the elven societies do not trust any deities, especially not those followed by humans, so there are no elven priests or temples.

The world of Aebyrnis (of which Cerilia is a continent) was once joined with the Shadow World. On this plane of shadows and illusions, now exists the Seelie who are more faerie-like than the sidhelien. The Cerilian lore hints that since the two worlds split, for every Cerilian sidhe, there is a corresponding member of the Seelie or Unseelie Courts.

=== Spelljammer ===
The elves are the largest political and military presence in space; at the time of the original Spelljammer: AD&D Adventures in Space boxed set, the elves had just completed a remarkably successful extermination of interstellar orcs and goblins throughout the known universe. 5th Edition introduced Astral Elves who are now native to the Astral Sea.

== Reception ==
Gus Wezerek, for FiveThirtyEight, reported that of the 5th Edition "class and race combinations per 100,000 characters that players created on D&D Beyond from" August 15 to September 15, 2017, elves were the second most created at 16,443 total, preceded by humans (25,248) and followed by half-elves (10,454). The three most popular class combinations with the elf were ranger (3,076), wizard (2,744) and rogue (2,257). Wezerek commented that some "races dovetail nicely with particular classes. The wood elf gets a bonus to dexterity as well as proficiency in longbows, perfect for the ranger class". In 2019, classics scholar C. W. Marshall positively remarked on the "wide diversity of genetically unique groups" of elves found in the game, "which can energize fans".
