= Player's Handbook =

Series of Dungeons & Dragons player rulebooks

Players Handbook (1978)
- Cover
- Author: Gary Gygax
- Cover artist: David A. Trampier
- Language: English
- Subject: Dungeons & Dragons 1st Edition
- Genre: Role-playing game
- Publisher: TSR, Inc.
- Publication date: June 1978
- Publication place: United States
- Media type: Print (Hardcover)
- Pages: 128
- ISBN: 0-935696-01-6
- OCLC: 13498304
- Dewey Decimal: 794 19
- LC Class: GV1469.62.D84 G94 1980

The Player's Handbook (spelled Players Handbook in first edition Advanced Dungeons & Dragons (AD&D), abbreviated as PHB) is the name given to one of the core rulebooks in every edition of the fantasy role-playing game Dungeons & Dragons (D&D). It does not contain the complete set of rules for the game, and only includes rules for use by players of the game. Additional rules, for use by Dungeon Masters (DMs), who referee the game, can be found in the Dungeon Master's Guide. Many optional rules, such as those governing extremely high-level players, and some of the more obscure spells, are found in other sources.

Since the first edition, the Player's Handbook has contained tables and rules for creating characters, lists of the abilities of the different character classes, the properties and costs of equipment, descriptions of spells that magic-using character classes (such as wizards or clerics) can cast, and numerous other rules governing gameplay. Both the Dungeon Master's Guide and the Player's Handbook give advice, tips, and suggestions for various styles of play. For most editions of D&D, The Player's Handbook, Dungeon Master's Guide, and Monster Manual make up the core rulebooks.

== Advanced Dungeons & Dragons ==
The first Players Handbook was released in June 1978 as a 128-page hardcover. It was written by Gary Gygax and edited by Mike Carr, who also wrote the foreword. The original cover art was by D.A. Trampier, who also provided interior illustrations along with David C. Sutherland III. Numerous foreign editions of the Players Handbook were published, including versions for the United Kingdom, Australia, France, and Germany. Games Workshop (U.K.) published a softcover version also in 1978. In 1983, TSR changed the cover art of the Players Handbook, although the interior contents remained the same. This printing featured cover art by Jeff Easley. Printings with this cover also bear an orange spine that fits in with other Advanced Dungeons & Dragons books. Dealers continued to place orders for the 1st edition Players Handbook even after 2nd edition was released, causing the final printing to be in July 1990, a year after the release of 2nd edition.

Shannon Appelcline highlighted that Dungeons & Dragons "is one of the few roleplaying games to maintain a split between core books for players and game masters throughout most of its history" and this split started with the release of the Players Handbook (1978), followed by the release of the Dungeon Masters Guide (1979). The AD&D core game rules were divided between these books, and the open-ended nature of the new rules mandated that for game campaigns to be run successfully they would now need a referee or Dungeon Master. The Players Handbook contained the information that players needed for playing the standard character classes: cleric, druid, fighter, ranger, paladin, magic-user, illusionist, thief, assassin, and monk. The book also included information on non-human races, such as dwarves, elves, and halflings, as well as character abilities, equipment such as armor and weapons, descriptions of spells, and optional rules to add psionics to the game. Appelcline noted that TSR mostly published books aimed at Dungeon Masters after the release of the core rulebooks until "the release of Unearthed Arcana (1985), which could easily have been called 'Player's Handbook 2', and Oriental Adventures (1985), an 'alternate players handbook' for the east".

In 1999, a paperback reprint of the first edition was released. In 2012, Wizards of the Coast released a new printing of the original book, billed as the "1st Edition Premium Player's Handbook", as part of a set of limited-edition reprints of the original 1st Edition core rulebooks: the Monster Manual, Player's Handbook, and Dungeon Master's Guide. These premium versions of the original AD&D rulebooks were reprinted with the original art and content, but feature a new cover design. Purchase of the reprinted Player's Handbook helped support the Gygax Memorial Fund—established to immortalize Gary Gygax with a memorial statue in Lake Geneva, Wisconsin.

=== Reception ===
The original Players Handbook was reviewed by Don Turnbull in issue No. 10 of White Dwarf, who gave the book a rating of 10 out of 10. Turnbull noted, "I don't think I have ever seen a product sell so quickly as did the Handbook when it first appeared on the Games Workshop stand at Dragonmeet", a British role-playing game convention; after the convention, he studied the book and concluded that "whereas the original rules are ambiguous and muddled, the Handbook is a detailed and coherent game-system, and very sophisticated." Turnbull felt a bit of apprehension at the amount of time it would require to digest all the new material, but concluded by saying "I said of the Monster Manual that it was TSR's most impressive publication to date; that is no longer true—this accolade must belong to the Handbook which is nothing short of a triumph."

Scott Taylor for Black Gate in 2014 listed the 1st edition AD&D Player's Handbook cover by artist David Trampier as #1 in "The Top 10 TSR Cover Paintings of All Time". Then in 2016, Taylor listed the Player's Handbook as #5 on the list of "Top 10 'Orange Spine' AD&D Hardcovers By Jeff Easley, saying "you aren't going to top Trampier's version, but nonetheless, for many players who didn't start D&D in the 1980s, THIS is their Players Handbook, and many of us have imagined this fantastic fight as we sat around a gaming table."

== Advanced Dungeons & Dragons 2nd Edition ==
Player's Handbook (1989)
- Author: David "Zeb" Cook
- Illustrator: Douglas Chaffee, Larry Elmore, Craig Farley, John and Laura Lakey, Erik Olson, Jack Pennington, Jeff Butler, Jeff Easley, Jean E. Martin, Dave Sutherland
- Cover artist: Jeff Easley
- Language: English
- Subject: Dungeons & Dragons 2nd Edition
- Genre: Role-playing game
- Publisher: TSR, Inc.
- Publication date: 1989
- Publication place: United States
- Media type: Print
- Pages: 246
- ISBN: 0-88038-716-5

The Advanced Dungeons & Dragons 2nd Edition Player's Handbook was a 256-page hardcover book written by David "Zeb" Cook and released in 1989. The original cover art is by Jeff Easley, and the book featured eight full-page illustrations in color. Gary Gygax originally started development of the next edition of AD&D and planned on incorporating rules revisions from the Unearthed Arcana (1985) and Oriental Adventures (1985) in a new Player's Handbook. However, Gygax was forced out of TSR by the end of 1985 "and his plans for second edition were abandoned". In 1986, Editor Steve Winter convinced management at TSR that the game needed more than a "reorganization" and instead that the game "should be redeveloped"; Winter and Cook then spent several years developing AD&D 2nd Edition. In August 1987, Director of Games Development Michael Dobson outlined that "the two core books were to be done by December 1987, then turned over to the RPGA for playtesting in early 1988, then returned to TSR for redevelopment in late 1988" aiming to release in "March or April 1989". Shannon Appelcline highlighted that "Dobson's scheduling was quite accurate, as the 2e Player's Handbook (1989) appeared in February 1989, then the 2e Dungeon Master's Guide (1989) in May".

The Player's Handbook (1989) for 2nd edition was designed to be compatible with 1st edition rules, but the information in the book was streamlined and clarified. Appelcline commented that unlike the previous Players Handbook (1978), Player's Handbook (1989) became the larger "core rulebook of the game" and included most of "the character creation rules and everything else that players should know". The book contained the information on how to play the standard character classes organized in categories consisting of warriors (fighters, paladins, and rangers), wizards (mages and specialist wizards such as illusionists), priests (clerics, with guidelines for variance by mythos, including the druid as an example), and rogues (thieves and bards); while most character classes remained similar to their versions in the 1st edition rules, the bard was regularized to function more like the other classes, and the assassin and monk were removed. TSR, Inc. also removed some races from the game, such as half-orcs, although some of these were added back into the game in supplements, such as The Complete Book of Humanoids.

Appelcline noted that following the release of the Player's Handbook (1989), TSR published a "player-focused series of splatbooks, the "PHBR" Complete series (1989-1995)"; in the TSR code system, "PHBR" stood for Player's Handbook reference series. It was in the Player's Option: Spells & Magic sourcebook for the second edition that the artificer was first introduced, as a specialist choice for magic users specifically. A set of optional rules for proficiencies was added, to represent skills, and sections detailing role-playing, combat, magic, time and movement, equipment, and spell descriptions were all expanded from the original book. The book included major changes regarding character classes, races, and magic, and incorporated many new rules that had been published in supplements such as Unearthed Arcana (1985) and Dragonlance Adventures (1987).

Player's Handbook (1995)
- Author: David "Zeb" Cook
- Cover artist: Jeff Easley
- Language: English
- Subject: Dungeons & Dragons 2nd Edition, Revised
- Genre: Role-playing game
- Publisher: TSR, Inc.
- Publication date: 1995
- Publication place: United States
- Media type: Print
- Pages: 320
- ISBN: 0-7869-0329-5

In 1995, a new version of the 2nd edition Player's Handbook was released as part of TSR's 25th anniversary. The book was revised, becoming sixty-four pages larger, mainly due to layout changes and new artwork. A new foreword in this edition specifically stated that the book was not Advanced Dungeons & Dragons 3rd edition.

The 2nd edition Player's Handbook was reproduced as a premium reprint on May 21, 2013.

=== Reception ===
In the May 1989 edition of Games International, James Wallis called the 2nd edition "an improvement over the original", but concluded that it was "a step forward for the game, but a very small step." Wallis felt that the many improvements called for by the "archaic mechanics" and "hugely overly-complex" rules had not been addressed, and that the game still provided "a terrible introduction to role-playing." He concluded that the designer "lacked the vision to see what could have been done with the material", and gave the book a below-average rating of 2 out of 5, saying, "AD&D may be the biggest selling rolegame of all time, but like the IBM PC, that doesn't mean that it isn't thoroughly obsolete and to be avoided."

The 2nd edition Player's Handbook was an Origins and Gamer's Choice award winner. Lawrence Schick, in his 1991 book Heroic Worlds, called the book "a vast improvement" over the 1st edition book; he noted that the monk character class had been "banished to Oriental Adventures where it belongs", but commented that the spell descriptions "have positively bloated to over 100 pages".

Stephan Wieck reviewed the Player's Handbook within a broader review of the 2nd Edition rules in a 1989 issue of White Wolf. He saw the revised rules as a clear improvement. He noted that its "interior is laid out very well and is graphically attractive" with a helpful color scheme.

== Dungeons & Dragons 3rd edition ==
Player's Handbook (2000)
- Authors: Monte Cook, Jonathan Tweet, Skip Williams
- Illustrator: Lars Grant-West, Scott Fischer, John Foster, Todd Lockwood, David Martin, Arnie Swekel, Sam Wood
- Cover artist: Henry Higgenbotham
- Language: English
- Subject: Dungeons & Dragons 3rd Edition
- Publisher: Wizards of the Coast
- Publication date: August 10, 2000
- Publication place: United States
- Media type: Print
- Pages: 302
- ISBN: 978-0-7869-1550-7

The third edition, published August 10, 2000, (with the Player's Handbook debuting at that year's Gen Con, in August 2000) represented a major overhaul of the game, including the adoption of the d20 system. The third edition also dropped the word Advanced from the title, as the publisher decided to publish only one version of the game instead of both basic and advanced versions.

Monte Cook, Jonathan Tweet, and Skip Williams all contributed to the 3rd edition Players Handbook, Dungeon Master's Guide, and Monster Manual, and then each designer wrote one of the books based on those contributions. Tweet is credited with the book's design. The 3rd edition Player's Handbook also saw the return of half-orcs and monks to the core rules set, along with some all-new classes.

The reviewer from Pyramid commented on the release of third edition, stating: "There's a lot to like about Dungeons and Dragons 3rd Edition as seen in the Player's Handbook. The new artwork is gorgeous and evocative, and in the 286 pages of the main rulebook there's a lot of well-written and tightly packed rules." Another reviewer wrote a response to the first review. A third reviewer felt that the design team "smoothed out the rough edges from Advanced Dungeons & Dragon 2nd Edition and added tons of new goodies to make D&D 3rd Edition the best combat-oriented RPG you can buy".

=== Dungeons & Dragons v3.5 ===
Player's Handbook (2003)
- Authors: Andy Collins, Peter Adkison, Richard Baker
- Illustrator: Lars Grant-West, Scott Fischer, John Foster, Jeremy Jarvis, Todd Lockwood, David Martin, Wayne Reynolds, Arnie Swekel, Sam Wood
- Cover artist: Henry Higginbotham
- Language: English
- Subject: Dungeons & Dragons v3.5
- Publisher: Wizards of the Coast
- Publication date: July 2003
- Publication place: United States
- Media type: Print
- Pages: 320
- ISBN: 0-7869-2886-7
- Followed by: Player's Handbook II (2006)

In July 2003, the rules were revised again to version 3.5 based on two years of player feedback. Revisions to the Player's Handbook included the classes becoming more balanced against each other. Andy Collins explained that he was originally put in charge of "evaluating the 3.0 Dungeon Master's Guide to see if there were places where the rules could stand any improvement or upgrades" as a "thought experiment for R&D"; however, by winter 2001, there was a shift to developing Dungeons & Dragons v3.5 to reflect the game's rapid evolution. Collins was put in charge of the Player's Handbook (2003) development with Rich Redman on the Dungeon Master's Guide (2003) and Skip Williams on the Monster Manual (2003). When asked about the changes from the prior Player's Handbook (2000) release, Williams said "I think they range from the almost invisible (unless it affects your character directly) to the pretty radical," while Collins replied "Well, I don't think I'd call any of the changes 'radical.' Even though some characters will undergo some significant changes, the aim is for the character to still feel like the same character, only with more interesting and balanced options." Monte Cook, one of the lead designers of the 3rd Edition who left Wizards of the Coast in 2001, was critical of v3.5 in his review of the new core rulebooks – "this revision is too much, too soon. In fact, it's much more than just a 'revision.' That said, most of the changes it presents are good. The bad changes, thankfully, won't have a huge impact on your game". Cook claimed that this new edition "was motivated by financial need rather than by design need".

May 2006 saw the release of the Player's Handbook II, designed to follow up the standard Player's Handbook. This book was designed by David Noonan. It contains four new classes, along with new spells, feats, and new role-playing options. Its cover pays homage to the 1st edition Player's Handbook.

The 3.5 edition Player's Handbook was reproduced as a premium reprint on September 18, 2012.

== Dungeons & Dragons 4th edition ==
Player's Handbook (2008)
- Authors: Rob Heinsoo, Andy Collins, James Wyatt
- Illustrator: Zoltan Boros, Gabor Szikszai, Matt Cavotta, Eric Deschamps, Wayne England, David Griffith, Ralph Horsley, Howard Lyon, Raven Mimura, Lee Moyer, William O'Connor, Steve Prescott, Dan Scott, Anne Stokes, Franz Vohwinkel, Eva Widermann
- Cover artist: Wayne Reynolds (front), Dan Scott (back)
- Language: English
- Subject: Dungeons & Dragons 4th Edition
- Genre: Role-playing game
- Publisher: Wizards of the Coast
- Publication date: June 6, 2008
- Publication place: United States
- Media type: Print
- Pages: 320
- ISBN: 0-7869-4867-1
- Followed by: Player's Handbook 2 (2009); Player's Handbook 3 (2010)

On June 6, 2008, the Fourth Edition Player's Handbook, subtitled Arcane, Divine and Martial Heroes, was released. It was originally announced that the 4th edition's three core rulebooks would be released over a three-month period, but the date changed after customer feedback revealed a majority preference among D&D customers to have all three core rulebooks released in the same month. The Fourth Edition Player's Handbook was designed by Rob Heinsoo, Andy Collins, and James Wyatt. The front cover illustration was by Wayne Reynolds and the back cover illustration was by Dan Scott.

The first Player's Handbook includes eight classes: cleric, fighter, paladin, ranger, rogue, warlock, warlord, and wizard, and eight races: dragonborn, dwarf, eladrin, elf, human, half-elf, halfling, and tiefling. The warlock and warlord classes, and the dragonborn and tiefling races, represented new additions to the core rules, while the book left out previous core elements such as the monk and bard classes and the gnome and half-orc races. Wizards of the Coast emphasized that those elements would be coming in subsequent Player's Handbooks and would be considered to be as central to the game as those in the first book. Shannon Appelcline highlighted that the omission of some classic character classes and races was considered controversial – "the designers later said that they regretted not saying that the first Player's Handbook was just a starting place for D&D 4e" as "more races and classes would appear in the years to come".

Appelcline opined that the Player's Handbook (2008) was notable for being "the most complete player's rulebook ever produced for" Dungeons & Dragons since it contained "all the character creation rules", "all the other core rules" and "first time ever it included magic items". He explained that one of the 4th Edition goals was "moving the game away from being a simulation and toward being a more cinematic gaming experience – something that would allow players to simply reskin their character fluff without it changing the game itself" and so player character classes saw "the biggest revamp". He highlighted that fewer roleplaying aspects were codified while the gameplay mechanics were "more focused on combat than in previous editions" making battle maps very important; the healing surge mechanic reflected the importance of combat while "spells and other abilities that weren't combat-oriented either disappeared or were revamped".

The 4th edition Player's Handbook 2, subtitled Arcane, Divine and Primal Heroes, was released on March 17, 2009. The Player's Handbook 2 includes eight classes: the avenger, barbarian, bard, druid, invoker, shaman, sorcerer, and warden, and five races: the deva, gnome, goliath, half-orc, and shifter. The book reached No. 28 on USA Today's bestseller list the week of March 26, 2009 and No. 14 on the Wall Street Journal's non-fiction bestseller list a week later.

A third book in the series, Player's Handbook 3, subtitled Psionic, Divine and Primal Heroes, was released on March 16, 2010. The book was designed by Mike Mearls, Bruce R. Cordell, and Robert J. Schwalb, and featured cover art by Michael Komarck. It includes six classes: ardent, battlemind, monk, psion, runepriest, and seeker, along with four races: wilden, the minotaur, githzerai, and shardminds. The PHB3 also includes new multi-classing rules for hybrid characters.

=== Reception ===
John Baichtal of Wired highlighted that he liked the various character changes included in the Player's Handbook (2008) – "a lot of people have been talking about how MMPORGs have influenced D&D, particularly toward making advancement more fun. There are cool new powers at nearly every level, and all the classes are equally balanced". He commented that the shift between 3.5 and 4th Edition is "as profound as between, say, 1st Edition AD&D and 3.5". He also liked the healing surge ability the sourcebook introduced as it allows player characters (PCs) "to be more adventurous and daring". However, he "didn't like" how various classes and races (such as bard, barbarian, druid, monk, gnome, and half-orc) were left out of the Player's Handbook (2008). Baichtal opined that 4th Edition "certainly isn't a token update to sell more books" with "thoughtful" changes and an "easy start that makes newbie PCs tough enough to take care of business".

== Dungeons & Dragons 5th edition ==
Player's Handbook (2014)
- Cover art by Tyler Jacobson
- Rules required: Dungeons & Dragons 5th edition, 2014 version
- Lead designers: Jeremy Crawford
- Authors: (Rules Development); Rodney Thompson, Peter Lee; (Writing); James Wyatt, Robert J. Schwalb, Bruce R. Cordell
- First published: August 19, 2014
- Pages: 320
- ISBN: 978-0-7869-6560-1

The 5th Edition Player's Handbook was released on August 19, 2014 by Wizards of the Coast. The Player's Handbook contains the basic rules of the 5e system, the base classes and races, and character customization options. The cover art by Tyler Jacobson features King Snurre, from The Hall of the Fire Giant King (1978) adventure module, looming over two heroes engaged in battle with him. Jacobson explained that "the angle is so extreme in order to convey a desperate battle again such a giant foe. I wanted to put the female hero in a pose that seemed very 'last ditch effort' to cast a spell and possibly take him out [...]. But mainly I just wanted a composition that was very action-packed". He also highlighted the blue magic "about to be cast" by the heroine as the focal point with the bright color contrasting "the hot colors everywhere else in the image".

Wizards of the Coast rereleased the three core rulebooks as part of a bundled boxset, titled Dungeons & Dragons Core Rulebooks Gift Set, in November 2018; the rulebooks contain the errata for the edition. An alternative edition of the set, with new cover art by Hydro74, was only available through local game stores. Gavin Sheehan for Bleeding Cool highlighted that the alternative cover art of the Player's Handbook features "the 'welcoming' face of King Snurre, iron helmet and all looking at you like you don't belong here and why shouldn't he put you down? I love the design of his helmet cast in a slightly deeper red with orange eyes and bear shining underneath".

=== Reception ===
In Publishers Weekly's "Best-selling Books Week Ending September 1, 2014", Player's Handbook was #1 in "Hardcover Nonfiction" and sold 22,090 units; it was #7 on the overall bestseller list. It remained in the "Hardcover Nonfiction" top 25 for four weeks. The Player's Handbook was the top selling book at Amazon on its release day. The 5th edition Player's Handbook won the 2015 Origins Award for Best Role Playing Game and Fan Favorite Role Playing Game. The book won three 2015 gold ENnie Awards, "Best Game", "Best Rules", "Product of the Year", and one silver award for "Best Writing" by Jeremy Crawford, James Wyatt, Robert J. Schwalb, and Bruce R. Cordell.

Jeff LaSala of Tor.com commented that "there's no denying" the "visual appeal" of the covers for the 5th Edition sourcebooks and that he was "extremely satisfied to see the Player's Handbook's cover at last give us an action heroine in sensible clothing—quite a contrast to last edition's PHB cover. Whatever anyone thinks of the overall format and design of these books, that's a huge win". Andrew Zimmerman Jones of Black Gate commented on the 5th edition Player's Handbook: "Their rules light approach make it a natural system for old fans to bring new players into the hobby, but even with this initial offering there are enough customization options to keep old school gamers happy playing with it." Chuck Francisco of Mania.com commented: "While it was an easily accessible system, 4e left a lukewarm feeling with my gaming group. There was something too generic and uninteresting about player characters which pervaded the system, especially in the wake of 3.5e (which some felt provided too many options so as to be confusing). In the process, 4e characters lost an indescribable crunchy feeling, but I'm pleased to say that it's been brought back for the newest installment of this venerated table top series." In comparing the 2014 Player's Handbook to the 1978 Player's Handbook, James Floyd Kelly of GeekDad viewed the AD&D sourcebook as both "outstandingly fun" and "a product of its time" while "this new 5th edition feels streamlined... and much more accessible". Kelly commented that "the writing is much more polished. The artwork more inspiring. And the overall look and feel (with the layout of the graphical elements and charts and the organization of material) is appealing both visually and for comprehension. New gamers are going to find this new material fun to read – at no time did I feel bogged down as I was reading".

Henry Glasheen of SLUG Magazine highlighted getting "lost in the artwork" of the 2014 Player's Handbook as the new edition's "art has the patient beauty of old-school high adventure, amped up with a distinctly modern aesthetic" and "everything has this magnificent watercolor texture that, while obviously digital in most cases, gives each piece a familiar, knowable feel". John Farrell at Gaming Trend called the 2014 Player's Handbook artwork "both iconic and evocative" although "of questionable quality in very few places". Glasheen enjoyed the character creation process including the new Background system and thought making the Feats system optional "de-clutters the game and removes the incentive to try and break system mechanics". Similarly, Farrell commented that "character creation is fast and easy, without an overload of options at the outset" and with a simpler ruleset, this edition "has found substantial yet unobtrusive ways to bring your thoughts to roleplay without enforcing rigid methods of keeping in line with an archetype". In terms of gameplay, Farrell highlighted the "simplicity of the actions" which makes "combat more fast-paced" and praised the bounded accuracy of the game. Farrell thought that the "game is fun, simply put, and guaranteed to pull new players into the fold". Glasheen commented that while the game is less complex than previous editions, 5th Edition "is easily my favorite, ranking even higher than D&D 3.5, my first love in D&D". However, those looking for "a hardcore RPG to test your skills at optimizing characters and crunching numbers" are probably not going to enjoy 5th Edition as much since the focus "is heavy on story and keeps the mechanics fast and loose".

=== 2024 revision ===
Player's Handbook (2024)
- Cover art by Tyler Jacobson
- Rules required: Dungeons & Dragons 5th edition, 2024 version
- Lead designers: Jeremy Crawford
- Authors: Christopher Perkins, Ben Petrisor, F. Wesley Schneider, Ray Winninger, James Wyatt
- First published: September 17, 2024
- Pages: 302
- ISBN: 9780786969517

The backward compatible Player's Handbook (2024), as part of the 2024 revision to the 5th Edition ruleset, updates preexisting player options while introducing new content to the game. The sourcebook was released globally on September 17, 2024. Wizards of the Coast released a limited number of copies for sale six weeks early at Gen Con; local game stores in the Wizards Play Network were allowed to release the Player's Handbook for early access on September 3, 2024. The digital edition on D&D Beyond also came with early access for subscribers who pre-ordered.

Wizards of the Coast also released an alternate cover edition which will be available only in local game stores; shipping delays pushed the release of the alternate cover outside of North America to October 2024. The standard edition features cover art by Tyler Jacobson and the alternate cover features art by Wylie Beckert. Alex Meehan, for Dicebreaker, highlighted that the standard edition features a party of adventurers with "a friendly golden dragon standing behind them" and the "artwork strongly implies that the group is in the midst of a battle". In comparing the cover of the 2024 Player's Handbook to the 2014 Player's Handbook, Matt Bassil of Wargamer commented that "the old cover is an obvious power fantasy: look how powerful you can become and the cool things you can fight" while the new cover has a different focus: "look at the variety of DnD races and classes you can play, and the cool people you'll be hanging out with". Bassil thought it was "interesting that Wizards" chose to highlight the group dynamic on the 2024 cover, which "wasn't such a priority in 2014". He also saw it as a clear attempt to "champion diversity" and convey that Dungeons & Dragons "is for everyone". Meehan commented that the 2024 alternate cover "gives off a very different vibe" with the party in cave "sharing a pot of tea" and "included within this serene tea party is a golden dragon – somewhat linking things back to the standard cover – who grasps a normal-sized tea cup in one massive paw, with the party's rogue balancing on part of the dragon's body above". Josh Herman, head of art at Wizards of the Coast, commented that they liked making a "not so aggressive" cover which is "a sweeter, calmer version of" the standard cover. Herman explained that combat is a "huge pillar of D&D, but sometimes a lot of what D&D is, is just storytelling" and the alternate cover reflects the camp downtime the party has between adventures.

==== Reception ====
Wizards of the Coast announced that the Player's Handbook (2024) was "the fastest-selling Dungeons & Dragons product ever" and surpassed Tasha’s Cauldron of Everything (2020) to become "the biggest product launch in the game's 50-year history". Scott Thorne of ICv2 noted that data service BookScan, which publishes "weekly sales figures of trade book sales in the U.S. from most chain retailers and over 800 independent booksellers" and covers "about 85% of the market", reported "a total of 3,773 copies sold". Thorne viewed BookScan as an accurate accounting of bookstore sales, however, not an accurate accounting of every sale as very few hobby game stores report their sales to BookScan and BookScan's figures do not appear to include the 3,000 copies sold at GenCon.

Benjamin Abbott of GamesRadar+ commented that "with this 2024 update, the Player's Handbook is finally as lavish as you'd expect" and that in the 2014 edition, "too much was left to your imagination. Class pages, some of the most used in the game, were frequently limited to one or two illustrations and decorative elements apiece, while the spell section was an unrelenting wall of text". Abbott highlighted that "alongside a much grander piece of hero art for each class (which proudly takes up a whole page this time), each subclass also gets an evocative illustration", every character background has "a landscape or scene that begs you to imagine your character there", and there is "artwork displaying how a spell works every page or two – and it's actually quite compelling, showing off how magic works". Beside the art, Abbott thought "in direct contrast to previous editions where sections bled together", the 2024 edition has a more sensible layout design and emphasizes reader accessibility. Joshua Rivera, in a pre-release review for Polygon, thought that the 2014 Player's Handbook was "clearly built with the assumption that the reader arrives with some level of buy-in or, preferably, someone to guide them" while the 2024 Player's Handbook is a "modern and clean reworking of the first book every D&D player reads" and is far more accessible than its predecessor. He highlighted the thoughtful layout and that while "rules are explained when necessary", more complicated aspects "are relegated to a glossary in the appendices". Rivera commented that this updated sourcebook is "better suited to how the game is played in 2024" and "feels well-planned in a way previous books haven't, offering an organic path through the game's concepts and ideas". Following the release, Charlie Hall of Polygon also emphasized the "user-friendly" aspects of the sourcebook which he thought "seamlessly" onboards players – "lead graphic designer Matt Cole and art director Emi Tanji should be given medals, because the very shape of the brand feels suddenly glossy, modern, and new". However, Hall criticized the digital edition on D&D Beyond as the platform is "cluttered and complex, so filled with speed bumps and interruptions"; while he recommended purchasing the physical sourcebook, Hall also recommended avoiding D&D Beyond "unless you know exactly what you're doing".

Chase Carter of Rascal commented that while he "ultimately" echoed Hall's "plea to buy a physical copy of the 2024 Player's Handbook", and to do so from the local community if you're purchasing the new sourcebook, he also emphasized that he "can't recommend anyone purchase D&D 2024's Player's Handbook". He criticized Wizards of the Coast for releasing the Player's Handbook months before the other two core rulebooks in a move "that's simply prioritized towards the largest population of wallets" and opined that you can't truly review the 2024 update with only one core rulebook. Christian Hoffer of ComicBook.com viewed the 2024 Player's Handbook as "an improvement from its 2014 predecessor in almost every single way" since the sourcebook "is more accessible, has better art, a better layout, and has clearer rules". Hoffer highlighted that the update "played it safe" and that the sourcebook features many changes which "were either already implemented via different expansions or exist in the same design space as third-party material". Hoffer opined that "the designers should be acknowledged" for their work on improving the game, "however, nothing about the new Player's Handbook excites me as a veteran DM or makes me want to play Dungeons & Dragons more than I already did". Mollie Russell of Wargamer rated the 2024 Player's Handbook a 9 out 10 and commented that a close reading of the sourcebook shows a "complex web of small changes" but at a distance, while playing, "things still feel like fifth edition. The broader experience hasn't been innovated much, but on the bright side, that means it's just as fun to play as it was before". Russell thought that the sourcebook "loses a sense of place and character" in terms of world-building and there are some "issues with homogenisation", however, "the structure of the Player's Handbook is more logical, efficient, and beginner-friendly" and "most of the new rules you come across will delight rather than dismay".

== See also ==
- Editions of Dungeons & Dragons
- List of alternate Dungeons & Dragons classes
