= Dungeons & Dragons Tactics =

2007 video game

- Developer: Kuju Entertainment
- Publisher: Atari
- Platform: PlayStation Portable
- Release: NA: August 14, 2007; EU: August 24, 2007; AU: September 14, 2007
- Genre: Tactical RPG
- Modes: Single-player, multiplayer

Dungeons & Dragons Tactics is a tactical role-playing game released on the PlayStation Portable handheld video game console. It is set in the world of Dungeons & Dragons and uses a strict interpretation of the Dungeons & Dragons 3.5 Edition rule set.

== Plot ==
In the campaign storyline, players lead a party of adventurers on their quest to investigate an ancient being, about which little beyond the name is initially known. The plot is eventually revealed to be an epic contest between two dragons competing for godhood. The player can choose the path of good or evil, with different quests available depending on which is preferred, although the distinction between the two is not always clear. The game is divided up into a number of distinct battles or missions (30+), with the player able to access the majority of these during a given campaign, since several of the scenarios are mutually exclusive. Scenarios cannot be re-played once successfully completed.

The campaign revolves around a single lead character, with the other characters playing a supporting role. At the start of each scenario or battle, players select which additional adventurers to take along (up to a total of five such auxiliary characters after the first few scenarios). While this technically allows one to have more than six adventurers, only characters who actually participate in a given battle earn experience, so attempting to field a larger stable of cohorts serves to dilute earned experience levels.

The game features the core character classes from the 3.5 Player's Handbook: the Barbarian, Bard, Cleric, Druid, Fighter, Monk, Paladin, Ranger, Rogue, Sorcerer, and Wizard, as well as two non-core classes, the Psion and Psychic Warrior. A full set of character generation rules permit players to create their own characters, or use pre-generated characters selected from a "character library".

== Gameplay ==
Dungeons & Dragons Tactics uses a simple overworld map between battles. The map shows key locations of interest, with the party's current location depicted by a flag icon. While a few cutscenes are triggered upon entering certain locations, in general, the party is free to move to any known location. There is no notion of time associated with movement, and there are no random encounters. At some locations, players can buy additional goods, and can always trade items between characters or adjust character equipment. When a battle or mission is available at a given location, the "Adventure" action is presented, allowing players to undertake the indicated scenario.

Movement grid

Once a scenario begins, the player forms a party from the available characters, and the game then switches to adventuring mode. In this mode, the party and surroundings are displayed using a zoomed-in bird's-eye view. The camera can be rotated using the left analog stick and the map scrolled as desired, although only features (e.g. monsters) which characters can currently see are shown. In dimly lit environments, torches or the use of darkvision are required to achieve full visibility.

The game uses a menu-based action system, where a character is selected and his or her actions are then selected from a series of branching menu options. In "exploration mode", where no monsters are currently nearby, characters can take turns in any order, with the same character able to act again and again if desired. The party can also rest in this mode, restoring all spells and hitpoints. However, once a monster is observed or becomes aware of the party, the game switches to a standard initiative-based Dungeons & Dragons turn system. After all such enemies are defeated, the game returns to exploration mode. This cycle continues until either the party leader is defeated, or the completion conditions for the scenario are fulfilled.

While a few magical items are awarded for completing certain scenarios, most such treasure is stored in chests discovered during scenarios. These chests must be opened and their contents removed during the course of a mission if the characters are to make use of them. If a scenario is completed before such chests are open, their contents are lost forever. As characters cannot easily trade items amongst themselves during an adventure, weaker characters can easily become overloaded if they pick up a sufficiently heavy quantity of equipment. Items can be dropped on the ground and picked up by any other characters in your party if you wish to trade items during an adventure. This process can be time-consuming and is generally not recommended while in combat.

=== Multiplayer ===
Dungeons & Dragons Tactics supports several different multiplayer modes via the PlayStation Portable wireless connection. These include multiplayer deathmatch and co-operative modes supporting up to five players. Regardless of mode, only the pre-generated characters can be used; those from single player campaigns are not available in multiplayer.

In deathmatch mode, five different maps are available, while in the co-operative mode, players can choose from three.

== Reception ==
Reception

Aggregate scores
| Aggregator | Score |
|---|---|
| GameRankings | 59% |
| Metacritic | 58/100 |

Review scores
| Publication | Score |
|---|---|
| 1Up.com | 6.5 of 10 |
| GameSpot | 5 of 10 |
| GameSpy | 1.5 of 5 |
| IGN | 6.5 of 10 |

Dungeons & Dragons Tactics received negative reviews from most reviewers, who complained of numerous issues with the game. The user interface was universally noted as being cumbersome and difficult to use. The GameSpot review noted that players cannot just push a single button and move, but they need to push a button then scroll across a bunch of choices to select the move command. Another frequent source of frustration was the camera, which tends to be quite zoomed-in, hindering visibility. The IGN review commented that since the players don't really have the option to pull the camera out very far to see even on illuminated battlefields, much less darkened dungeon pathways, it can frequently be tricky to gain a sense of where the enemies are until they're right on top of the player.

On Metacritic, the game has a score of 58 out of 100.
