= List of Critical Role cast members =

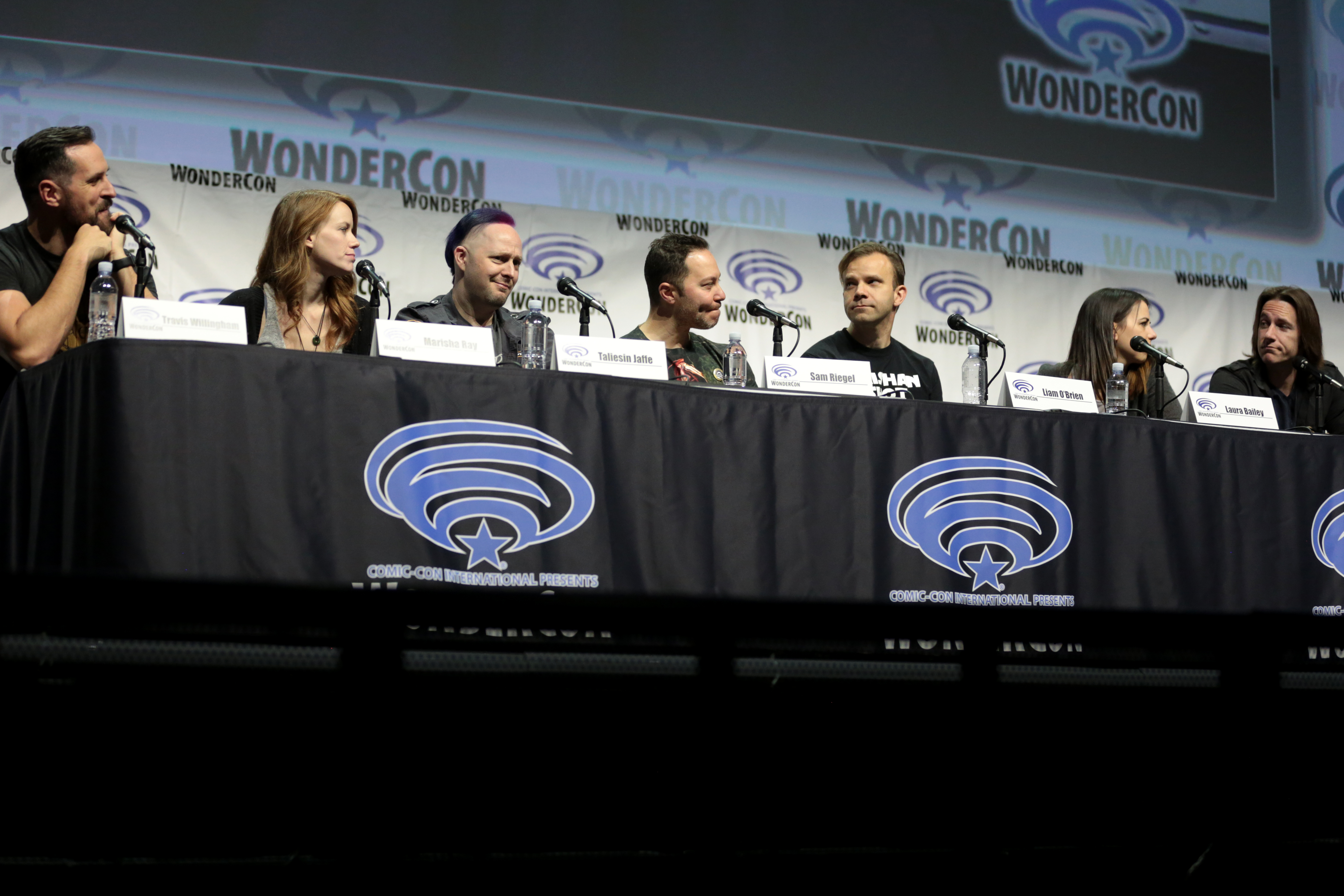
The main cast of Critical Role at WonderCon in 2017.

Part of the main cast for Campaign 4 at GalaxyCon Des Moines in 2026.

Critical Role (sometimes abbreviated as CR) is an American actual play web series in which a group of professional voice actors play Dungeons & Dragons. The principal cast consists of Matthew Mercer, Ashley Johnson, Travis Willingham, Laura Bailey, Liam O'Brien, Taliesin Jaffe, Marisha Ray, Orion Acaba, Sam Riegel, Robbie Daymond, Aabria Iyengar, Brennan Lee Mulligan, Luis Carazo, Whitney Moore and Alexander Ward.

There have been three campaigns set in world of Exandria – Campaign 1 which ran from March 2015 to October 2017, Campaign 2 which ran from January 2018 to June 2021, and Campaign 3 which ran from October 2021 to February 2025. While the first three campaigns are set in the same shared world, each follows a different set of characters created and played by the principal cast. However, Campaign 3 saw the return of Sir Bertrand Bell for the first three episodes. Bell was a character previously seen in The Search for Grog and The Search for Bob, which are in medias res wrap-up specials for Campaign 1. Bell is played by Willingham in each instance. Campaign 3 also has characters crossing over from the spinoff anthology series Exandria Unlimited (ExU); with Johnson starring as Fearne Calloway, and O'Brien as Orym of the Air Ashari. Fellow ExU cast member Robbie Daymond also guest stars as Dorian Storm throughout the campaign. Additionally, a number of player characters from earlier campaigns cameo as non-player characters (NPCs) played by Mercer in Campaign 3. Towards the end of Campaign 3, the players reprise their Campaign 1 and 2 characters for short arcs.

Campaign 4, which premiered in October 2025, is set in a new world, Aramán. It features an expansion of the main cast to 13 players and Mulligan taking over Mercer's place as Dungeon Master.

== Cast table ==
List indicator

This section includes characters who will appear or have appeared in each season.

- A green cell indicates the actor is a main cast member.
- A light blue cell indicates the actor is a guest or special guest cast member.
- A dark gray cell indicates the actor has not participated in the respective season.

Actor	Campaign 1 (Note: Campaign 1 is considered to include the canonic one shots The Search for Grog, The Search for Bob, Dalen's Closet and The Darrington Brigade)	Campaign 2 (Note: Campaign 2 is considered to include the canonic two-part special The Mighty Nein Reunited Part 1 – Unfinished Business, The Mighty Nein Reunited Part 2 – Uk'otoa Unleashed, and the one-shot The Mighty Nein Reunion: Echoes of the Solstice)	Campaign 3 (Note: Campaign 3 includes the mid-campaign special Critical Role: Downfall)	Campaign 4
Starring
Matthew Mercer	Dungeon Master (Note: In campaign 3, Mercer briefly relinquishes Dungeon Master (DM) duty twice. During Aabria Iyengar's guest stint as DM, he plays his Exandria Unlimited character, Dariax Zaveon. Mercer is absent for the three part, mid-campaign special Critical Role: Downfall, which is helmed by Brennan Lee Mulligan.)	Dungeon Master	Dungeon Master	Sir Julien Davinos
Ashley Johnson	Pike Trickfoot	Yasha Nydoorin	Fearne Calloway (Note: For the mid-campaign special Critical Role: Downfall, Johnson plays Trist.)	Vaelus
Travis Willingham	Grog Strongjaw Sir Bertrand Bell (Note: Appeared in the in medias res one shots The Search for Grog and The Search for Bob)	Fjord Stone	Sir Bertrand Bell Chetney Pock O'Pea	Teor Pridesire
Laura Bailey	Vex'ahlia "Vex" de Rolo (née Vessar)	Jester Lavorre	Imogen Temult (Note: For the mid-campaign special Critical Role: Downfall, Bailey plays Emhira.)	Thimble
Liam O'Brien	Vax'ildan "Vax" Vessar Lieve'tel Toluse Derrig (Note: Appeared in the epilogue one shot Dalen's Closet)	Caleb Widogast	Orym of the Air Ashari	Halandil Fang
Taliesin Jaffe	Percival "Percy" Fredrickstein Von Musel Klossowski de Rolo III	Mollymauk "Molly" Tealeaf Caduceus Clay Kingsley Tealeaf (Note: Appeared in the two-part epilogue special The Mighty Nein Reunited Part 1 – Unfinished Business and The Mighty Nein Reunited Part 2 – Uk'otoa Unleashed)	Ashton Greymoore (Note: For the mid-campaign special Critical Role: Downfall, Jaffe plays Asha.)	Bolaire Lathalia
Marisha Ray	Keyleth of the Air Ashari	Beauregard "Beau" Lionett	Laudna	Murray Mag'nesson
Orion Acaba	Tiberius Stormwind			
Sam Riegel	Scanlan Shorthalt Taryon Darrington	Nott the Brave	Fresh Cut Grass Braius Doomseed	Wicander Halovar
Robbie Daymond			Dorian Storm Cerkonos	Kattigan Vale
Aabria Iyengar			Deanna Leimert Dungeon Master	Thaisha Lloy
Brennan Lee Mulligan			Dungeon Master	Dungeon Master
Alexander Ward				Occtis Tachonis
Luis Carazo				Azune Nayar
Whitney Moore				Tyranny

== Main cast ==
For the first 27 episodes of Campaign 1 there were nine cast members: eight players and a Dungeon Master. This became eight from episode 28, when Orion Acaba left the show, and continued through the third campaign. The cast was then expanded to 13 players and one Dungeon Master with the fourth campaign; it was the first Critical Role campaign to use a West Marches-style (Note: In a West Marches game a large number of players are split into smaller groups. Although they play at separate tables, the actions of one group of players can have implications for the other groups.) structure.

=== Matthew Mercer ===
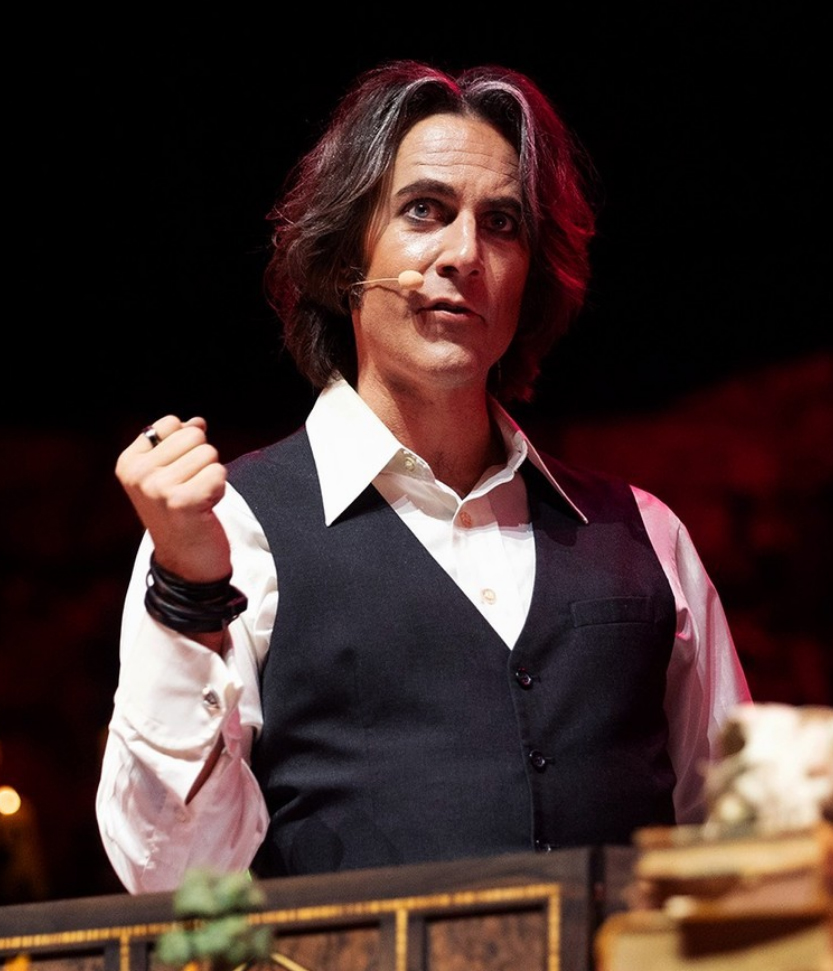
Matthew Mercer at the 2023 Critical Role live show in Wembley Arena

Mercer is Critical Role's primary Dungeon Master (DM). As the DM, Mercer organizes the gameplay, describes the effects the player characters' actions have on the world and narrative, and plays the non-player characters (NPCs). In Campaign 3, during Aabria Iyengar's stint as a guest DM, Mercer plays Dariax Zaveon—his Exandria Unlimited character. Mercer is absent during the Campaign 3's special, Critical Role: Downfall—a three part special, airing mid-way through Campaign 3 and helmed by Brennan Lee Mulligan.

Academics Zac Boyd and Míša Hejná, in the journal Language in Society, highlighted that Mercer "introduced 1,144 unique NPC characters during" the second campaign . They analyzed nineteen characters based on exceeding a threshold of minimum voice time and plot relevance and determined through "holistic analysis of voice quality" of these characters that "breathiness" in Mercer's voice "emerged as signalling positive morality and stances of safety, comfort, and trust, where whisperiness signals negative morality and stances of threat. Qualitatively, pitch dynamism was also found to correlate with morality and stancetaking: the more limited the pitch dynamism, the more likely it is that the character portrayed is an Enemy and that they adopt stances of threat". Academics Jens Kjeldgaard-Christiansen, Boyd, Hejná, and Mark Ølholm Eaton, in the Journal of Language and Pop Culture, then conducted a study involving 250 participants who assessed the perceived moral traits of 22 fictional characters, created and voiced by Mercer during the second campaign, after listening to short audio samples of their voices without narrative context. They noted that participants heard "protagonists and other morally positive characters" and "antagonists and other morally negative characters" as such; the main exception is that "subversively evil characters [...] were perceived as morally neutral, even trending toward good", which authors felt made sense as these characters are trying to hide their intentions. They highlighted that while the "participants had very different degrees of experience with Critical Role" from familiarity to no familiarity, the study showed "their moral perceptions of particular character voices were nevertheless remarkably consistent, and so were the perceptions of participants with different region/language backgrounds. These consistencies indicate that, rather than being peculiar to the voice actor or endemic to the fictional context of Critical Role, the vocal cues to which our participants responded may reflect culturally widespread and psychologically deep-seated forms of moral rhetoric that resound through different fictional contexts".

Academic Malene Brix Ley, in the Journal of Language Works, analyzed the voices of twenty allies and antagonists selected from the first three campaigns to investigate Mercer's use of linguistic profiling. Ley argued that "that Mercer does not use accents to differentiate between antagonists and allies" and while his antagonists have some linguistic profiling through his use of Standard British English (SBE), "the balanced distribution of allies' accents prevents players from associating any single accent with an ally" and Mercer's characters are "linguistically nuanced". She stated that Mercer uses specific accents that include "recognisable stereotypes" for the players; however, the "data indicates" Mercer uses "a range of standard and non-standard accents" to avoid "rigid moral associations" and "accents that could be perceived as appropriation or discrimination". While allied characters had a higher variation in accent distribution, antagonists predominantly had SBE accents; Ley noted that "Mercer also uses features associated with Upper-Crust [Received Pronunciation (RP)]" which is "linked with the British upper class". Antagonists Delilah and Sylas Briarwood, Trent Ikithon, and Ira Wendagot "embody stereotypical villainous traits", "all are manipulative and self-serving", and three are wizards – Ley commented that "this reinforces the association of SBE with negative qualities, particularly the stereotype of the intellectual yet malicious 'evil geniuses' [...]. Mercer's use of features from Upper-Crust RP further underscores these stereotypes and indexes their higher social status and authority". Kjeldgaard-Christiansen et al. highlighted Ley's study, and also noted the lack of moral consistency with Mercer's accents outside the use of SBE. The respondents in their study perceived the "most immoral" characters based on "their exceptional voice qualities" rather than "their particular accents".

In Campaign 4, Mercer plays as Sir Julien Davinos, a human fighter/rogue from House Davinos, a vassal to the noble Sundered House of Royce. He is childhood friends with Thjazi's widow, Lady Aranessa Royce, but hates Thjazi and was the one who captured him. Sir Julien's hated of Thjazi stems from the fall of House Davinos, for supporting Thjazi during the Falconer's Rebellion, and Lady Aranessa's love of Thjazi. At the funeral of Thjazi, Sir Julien becomes cursed after spitting on the body. House Tachonis kill the members of House Davinos and attempt to murder Lady Aranessa also, leading Sir Julien on a path of vengeance.

=== Ashley Johnson ===
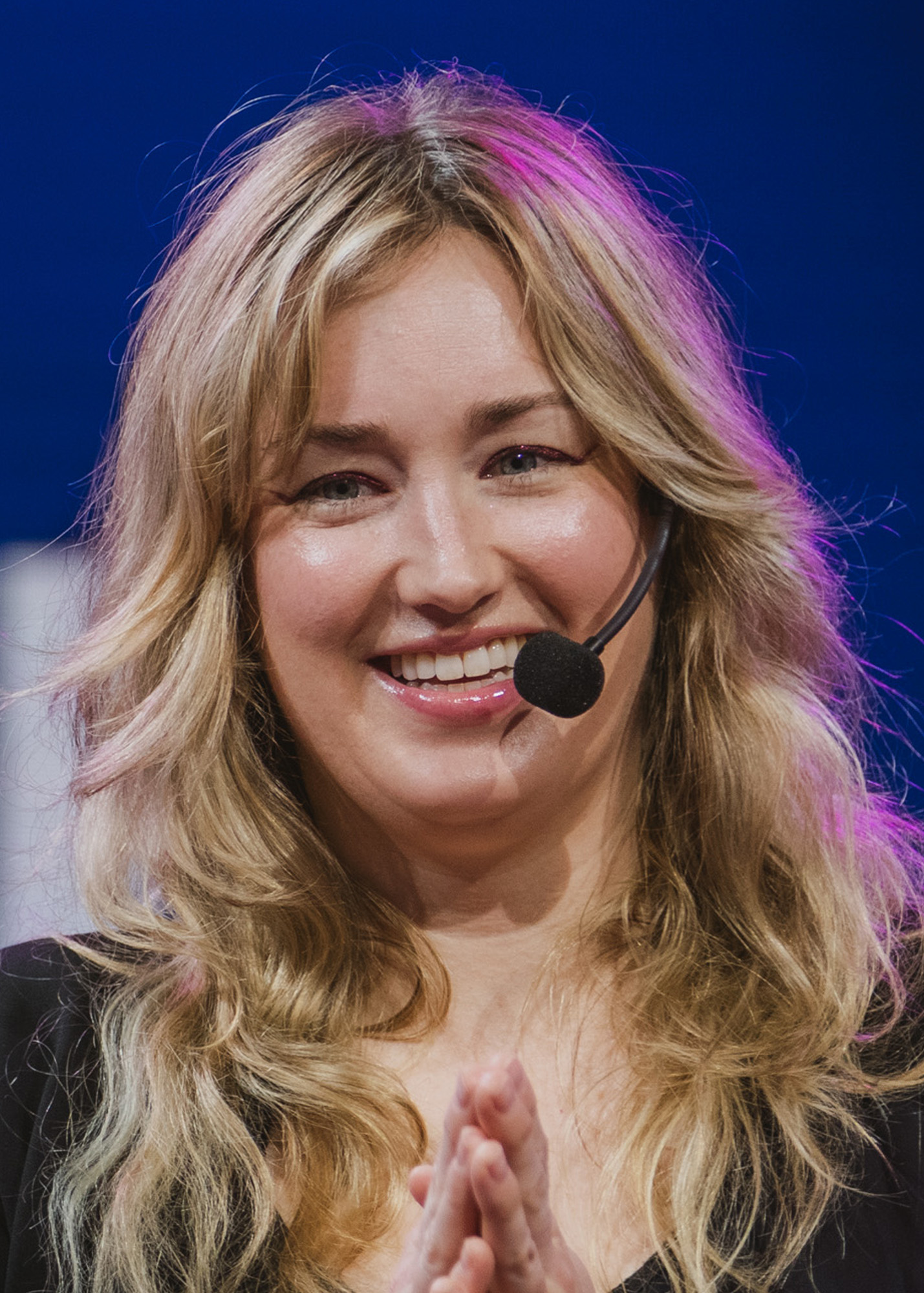
Ashley Johnson in 2024

Johnson, and her characters, have periods of absence during the first two campaigns due to her filming commitment in New York with NBC's Blindspot.

In Campaign 1, Johnson plays Pike Trickfoot, (Note: Returned in Campaign 3 as an NPC) a gnome cleric of Sarenrae. Pike was raised by her grandfather, Wilhand. She befriended Grog after he was exiled from his raiding group for refusing to kill Wilhand. Her hair turned white after being resurrected in the pre-stream game. She has a romantic interest in Percy, which is not reciprocated. Scanlan attempts to woo Pike throughout the campaign; it is not until the last few episodes that she gives him a chance.

Johnson's Campaign 2 character is Yasha Nydoorin, an aasimar barbarian who is exiled from her homeland in Xhorhas for marrying outside the strict arranged-marriage traditions of her clan. She is haunted by her time as the "Orphanmaker" and her involvement in a cult that gave its followers control over her.

Campaign 3 sees Johnson reprise her Exandria Unlimited character Fearne Calloway, Ruidusborn faun (Note: While Fearne's mother is also a faun, her father is an elf. Fearne later learns that she was born on Exandria under a Ruidus flare before her parents returned to the Feywild.) druid who travelled to the Material Plane from the Feywild to explore and find her parents. She can summon a wildfire spirit which appears as a fiery monkey named Little Mister. She met Orym and Dorian, along with other adventurers, in Emon and they formed the group known as the Crown Keepers. In the summer of 843 PD, (Note: PD refers to "Post Divergence", which is an epoch within the fictional timeline.) she journeyed to Jrusar with Orym and Dorian to support Orym's mission.

In Campaign 4, Johnson plays as Vaelus, an elven paladin (Note: In some materials, the production refers to several traditional Dungeons & Dragons character classes with alternative Critical Role class names: tracker for ranger, exemplar for paladin, prodigy mage for sorcerer, pact magus for warlock, arcanist for wizard, and wild mage for druid.) from the Mournvale and one of the Sisters of Sylandri, followers of the dead god of life and elves. She wants to reclaim an artifact known as the Stone of Nightsong, which was stolen by Thjazi. Vaelus is ancient, having been alive long before the Shapers' War occurred.

=== Travis Willingham ===
Travis Willingham in 2026

Willingham plays Grog Strongjaw in Campaign 1, a goliath barbarian who multiclasses into fighter. Grog was previously a member of a group of goliath raiders – known as the "Herd of Storms" – run by Grog's uncle, Kevdak. After refusing to kill Pike's grandfather; he was exiled, beaten and left for dead. Wilhand and Pike nursed Grog back to health, with Grog and Pike becoming best friends. In the Search for Grog and the Search for Bob one-shot specials, Willingham plays Sir Bertrand Bell, a human fighter who travels with Vox Machina to the plane of Pandemonium in 812 PD

Campaign 2 sees Willingham play Fjord Stone, a half-orc warlock who unwittingly makes a pact with a malevolent leviathan named Uk'otoa when he is drowning at sea. After a period of self-discovery, Fjord breaks his pact with Uk'otoa and becomes a follower of the wilderness goddess Wildmother, who also has dominion over the sea, and multiclasses into a paladin.

In Campaign 3, reprises his role as Bell for the first three episodes. In the following decades since Bell fought with Vox Machina, he has exaggerated his accomplishments. After an encounter with animated furniture in Jrusar, he introduced the group to Lord Ariks Eshteross. When he was separated from the party one evening, the dwarf Dugger ambushed and killed him – the party avenges him and later names the group the Bells Hells in his honor. After that character's death, Willingham plays as Chetney Pock O'Pea, a gnome blood hunter (Note: Blood hunter is a homebrew class developed by Mercer.)/rogue (Note: See Chetney's character card on screen in Episode 22.) who is also a woodworking artisan. He left Uthodurn in search of aid for his lycanthropy. He approaches the Bells Hells to ask for help searching for a man; following this, he joins the group as a full member.

In Campaign 4, Willingham plays as Teor Pridesire, a lionfolk paladin who fought alongside Kattigan, Thjazi, and Azune during the Falconer's Rebellion.

=== Laura Bailey ===
Laura Bailey in 2026

Bailey's Campaign 1 character is Vex'ahlia "Vex" de Rolo (née Vessar), a half-elf ranger who multiclasses in to rogue. She has a brown bear companion called Trinket.

Bailey plays Jester Lavorre in Campaign 2, a tiefling cleric who follows an obscure entity known as the Traveler. Her relationship with the Traveler is temporarily strained when she learns he is not actually a deity as originally claimed, but an archfey named Artagan, a recurring NPC from Campaign 1.

In Campaign 3 Bailey plays Imogen Temult, a Ruidusborn human sorcerer with psionic magic who has reoccurring dreams of a red storm. She and her companion Laudna travelled to Jrusar to investigate the origins of her psionic abilities and Laudna's necromantic abilities. Her mother, Liliana Temult, left when she was a child; the party's investigation into Ruidius leads them to discover that she and Liliana are Exaltant Ruidusborn who get power from the red moon. Liliana, as a general in the Ruby Vanguard, is working with the powerful elven archmage Ludinus Da'leth toward mysterious ends involving Ruidus. During the campaign, Imogen forms a romantic relationship with Laudna.

In Campaign 4, Bailey plays as Thimble, a four-inch-tall pixie rogue, from the land of Faerie. Thimble was the closest companion of rebel leader Thjazi Fang.

=== Liam O'Brien ===
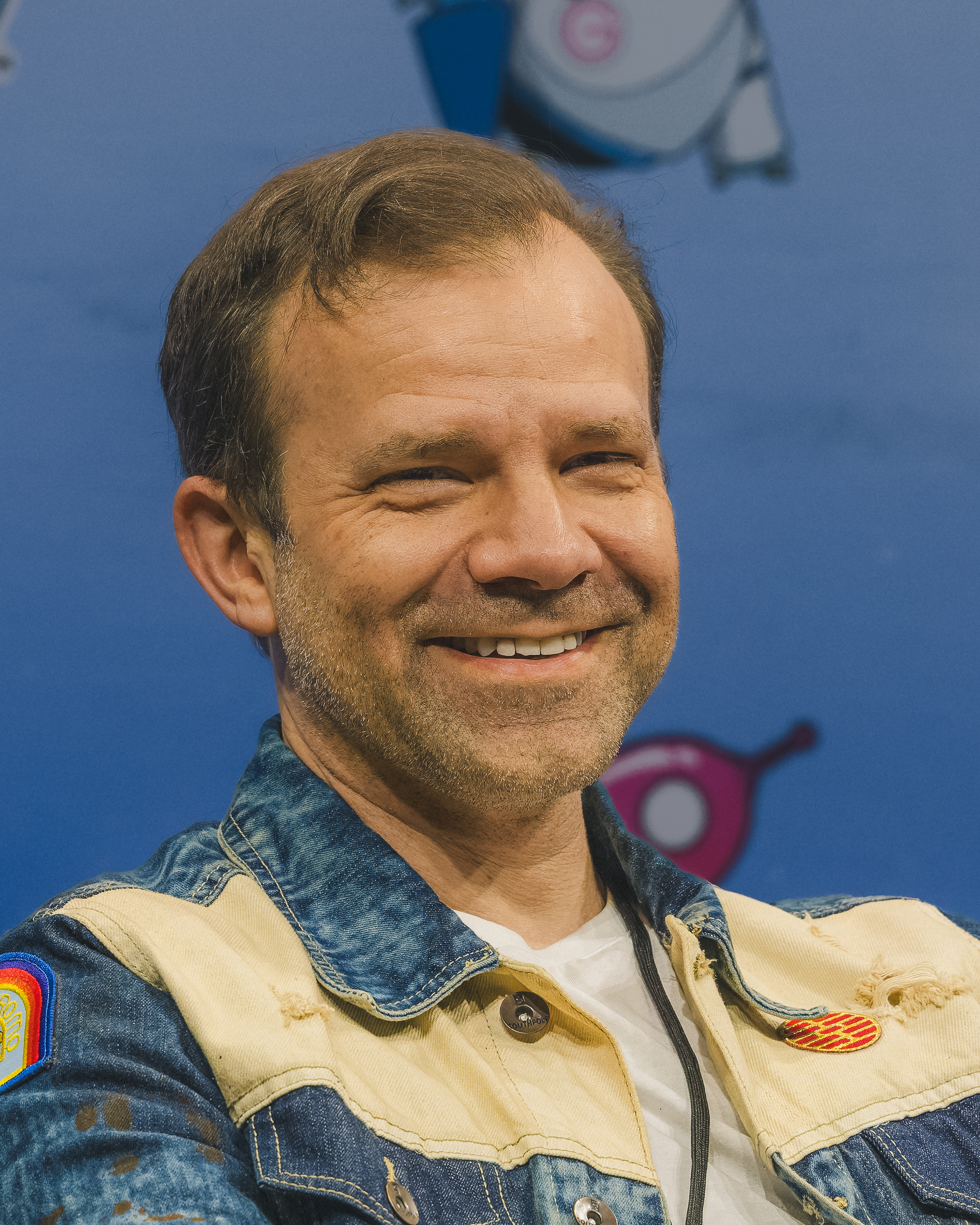
Liam O'Brien in 2026

Campaign 1 sees O'Brien play Vax'ildan "Vax" Vessar, a half-elf rogue who multiclasses into paladin and later druid. Vax is the brother of Vex. In exchange for his sister's resurrection, Vax pledges his allegiance to the Raven Queen. For the Search for Grog and the Search for Bob one-shot specials, O'Brien plays Lieve'tel Toluse, an elven cleric of the Raven Queen. In the Dalen's Closet one-shot, O'Brien plays Derrig, a half-elf fighter who is a bodyguard of Keyleth.

In Campaign 2, O'Brien plays Caleb Widogast, a human wizard who was enrolled at the Soltryce Academy, the Dwendalian Empire's premier magical school, until he was chosen to train to become an assassin for the Empire. This training was physically and mentally traumatizing, leading to a breakdown. Caleb is later known for inventing spells.

O'Brien plays Orym of the Air Ashari in Campaign 3. Orym is a halfling fighter on a mission from Keyleth of the Air Ashari to investigate an attack in Marquet. This attack was similar to an attack on Keyleth in 837 PD which left both Orym's husband Will and Will's father Derrig dead. He travelled to Jrusar with other members of the Crown Keepers.

In Campaign 4, O'Brien plays as Halandil "Hal" Fang, an orc bard who resides in Dol-Makjar and was granted the neighborhood's theater by the city's ruling council. He is the half-brother of Thjazi, and has multiple children, some with Thaisha.

=== Taliesin Jaffe ===
Taliesin Jaffe in 2026

Jaffe plays Percival "Percy" Fredrickstein Von Musel Klossowski de Rolo III in Campaign 1. Percy is a human gunslinger. (Note: Gunslinger is a homebrew class based on the "Gunslinger" archetype in Pathfinder and converted to 5th edition by Mercer. Mercer has since refined this into an unofficial subclass for 5th edition's fighter class.)

Early in Campaign 2, Jaffe plays Mollymauk "Molly" Tealeaf; a tiefling blood hunter and con artist working in a traveling circus. Mollymauk is killed when the Mighty Nein attempts to free party members from a slaver group. After Molly's death, Jaffe plays Caduceus Clay, a firbolg cleric in service of the Wildmother, goddess of the wilderness. Caduceus is searching for a way to save his home from a magical blight. The Mighty Nein recruits Caduceus before the party's second attempt to rescue their captured members; he remains with the group because he believes it will aid in his journey. In the Mighty Nein Reunited two-part special, Jaffe plays Kingsley Tealeaf; a tiefling blood hunter with levels in rogue.

For Campaign 3, Jaffe plays Ashton Greymoore, (Note: Uses he/they pronouns. For consistency the article uses they.) an earth genasi barbarian who attacked Jiana Hexum's home in Jrusar with a group called the Nobodies and was gravely injured; they were abandoned by the group and have been paying off their debt to Hexum since. On a job, they discovered Fresh Cut Grass and helped the automaton bury their companions. They later convince the Bell Hells to take a job from Hexum which pays off their debt to her.

In Campaign 4, Jaffe plays as Bolaire Lathalia, a warlock and curator of the Archanade, a museum of arcane artifacts. He appears to be wearing a grey mask that moves as if it were a living face; however, he is actually a sentient magic item created during The Shapers' War by the halflings to kill the trickster goddess Rauwyn. When worn, Bolaire takes control of the wearer's body. Bolaire fled to Dol-Makjar during the Falconer's Rebellion; he later befriended Hal but his secret was discovered by Thjazi, who blackmailed him over his true nature.

=== Marisha Ray ===
Marisha Ray in 2017

In Campaign 1 Ray plays Keyleth of the Air Ashari, a half-elf druid. Throughout the campaign Kayleth is on her Aramenté – a right of passage undertaken by future leaders of her tribe. She also hopes to find her mother, who vanished during her own Aramenté years earlier.

Ray plays Beauregard "Beau" Lionett in Campaign 2. Beau is a human monk working for the Order of the Cobalt Soul to root out corruption in the Dwendalian Empire. Beau is initially presented as being resentful of authority and anti-social, and rises to the rank of Expositor to carry out sensitive, covert investigations.

Campaign 3 sees Ray play Laudna, a resurrected human (known in-universe as a "hollow one" (Note: A race option within the Dungeons and Dragons sourcebook Explorer's Guide to Wildemount)) warlock and sorcerer (Note: Campaign 3 starts with Laudna already multiclassed) who was killed during the massacre that began the Whitestone Rebellion in 810 PD and was resurrected by necromantic magics; she has since occasionally heard the voice of the deceased Delilah Briarwood. She wandered for decades before meeting Imogen in the Taloned Highlands; the two later travelled to Jrusar in 843 PD. Laudna was killed by Otohan Thull of the Ruby Vanguard during a battle at the Paragon's Call fortress which led the Bells Hells to go on a successful quest to magically resurrect her. Later in the campaign, Laudna forms a romantic relationship with Imogen.

In Campaign 4, Ray plays as Murray Mag'nesson, a dwarven diviner wizard who is a bursar at the Penteveral, an arcane college. She was friends with Thjazi.

=== Orion Acaba ===
Acaba appears in Campaign 1 only; where he plays Tiberius Stormwind, a dragonborn sorcerer. Tiberius leaves the party after the first defeat of the Briarwoods and liberation of Whitestone. He dies offscreen in the defence of Draconia, the city-state he is from, during an attack by Vorugal—the white dragon of the Chroma Conclave. A statue is later erected in his honor.

=== Sam Riegel ===
Sam Riegel in 2026

For most of Campaign 1, Riegel plays Scanlan Shorthalt; a gnome bard. After the defeat of the Chroma Conclave, and a brush with death, Scanlan leaves the party for a period to spend time with his daughter. Whilst Scanlan is away Riegel plays Taryon "Tary" Darrington, a human artificer. Riegal used the musician Eminem as an inspiration for Scanlan.

Campaign 2 sees Riegel play Nott the Brave, a goblin rogue who escaped jail with Caleb and wishes to support his growing magical potential. She was previously a halfling woman named Revetha "Veth" Brenatto and was cursed to be a goblin after a goblin raiding party captured her family. She is returned to her halfling body in episode 97 and struggles with her conflicting desires to continue adventuring with the Mighty Nein, and to stay with her husband and child. In the one-shot The Mighty Nein Reunion: Echoes of the Solstice, set seven years after the end of Campaign 2, Riegel briefly reprises his role as Veth before playing as Veth's son Luc Brenatto.

In Campaign 3, Riegel plays Fresh Cut Grass, an automaton (Note: Automaton appears to be a homebrew race developed by Riegel and Mercer.) cleric with ancient Aeorian design who was reassembled by the tinkerer Dancer in 838 PD. They are the surviving member of the party known as the Division of Public Benefit. They initially believe that they were built by Dancer but the party learns FCG was a pre-Divergence Harmonious Aeormaton named Faithful Care-Giver. While they don't have memories of this time period, FCG fears that they participated in an assassination attempt known as the Care and the Culling after learning that they repressed memories of killing the other members of the Division of Public Benefit during a panic attack. After Riegel's character FCG sacrificed themself to save the Bells Hells in Episode 91 (April 2024), Riegel took a leave of absence from the show to receive treatment for cancer. He returned to the show with a new character, Braius Doomseed, in June 2024. Braius is a minotaur paladin–bard multiclass devoted to Asmodeus.

In Campaign 4, Riegel plays as Wicander "Wick" Halovar, a human sorcerer from the noble Sundered House of Halovar and a Light Priest of the Candescent Creed, a new religion espoused by his house.

=== Robbie Daymond ===
Robbie Daymond in 2026

In Campaign 3, Daymond appears in a guest role as Dorian Storm, an air genasi bard who travelled to Jrusar with Orym and Fearne and helped form the Bells Hells. He later leaves the group to help smuggle his brother out of Marquet and rejoins the other members of the Crown Keepers in Tal'Dorei.

Daymond then joined the main cast for Campaign 4. He plays as Kattigan "Kat" Vale, a human ranger with a wolf companion named Wulfric. He previously fought alongside Thjazi, Teor, and Azune in the Falconer's Rebellion.

=== Aabria Iyengar ===
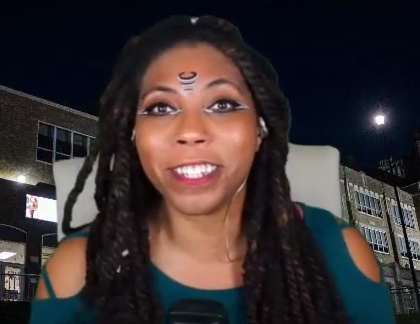
Aabria Iyengar in 2021

In Campaign 3, Iyengar appears in a guest role as Deanna Leimert, a gnome cleric of the Dawnfather. She and Chetney are exes; after they broke up, Deanna married, had a family and died. Her husband went on a quest and found a cleric who brought Deanna back to life two hundred years later. Later, as the campaign briefly catches up with the Crown Keepers from Exandria Unlimited (2021), Iyngar has a guest stint as Dungeon Master in back–to–back episodes.

Iyengar then joined the main cast for Campaign 4. Iyengar plays as Thaisha Lloy, an orc druid who follows the Old Path of rituals and magic separate from the gods. She is from House Lloy, a smithing house of importance in Dol-Makjar, and shares children with Halandil Fang.

=== Brennan Lee Mulligan ===
Brennan Lee Mulligan in 2026

At the end of Campaign 3 Episode 98, Mulligan took Mercer's place – his monologue was the opening of a magical projection of the past witnessed by Bells Hells and Ludnius Da'leth. Critical Role then announced the next episodes would be a three-part special titled "Downfall" with Mulligan as the Dungeon Master. In 2022, Mulligan was the Dungeon Master for the limited series Exandria Unlimited: Calamity (2022) which focused on the events that triggered the Calamity. "Downfall" is set over a century into the Calamity; while officially part of the third campaign, it is advertised as a standalone special that does not require prior knowledge of Critical Role or Exandria Unlimited. Cheryl Teh of Business Insider highlighted that "Downfall" focuses on the fall of the magocracy Aeor and suggested this will "allow Mulligan to flex his storytelling chops, perhaps reprising some elements of his first EXU: Calamity run". Mulligan commented that the two series wrestle with very different themes so while both are about the fall of flying cities, each has a distinct story. Mulligan also highlighted that while Calamity shows the trigger of the Calamity, it was more about the end of the Age of Arcanum while Downfall occurs over a century into the Calamity and showcases that era. Mulligan was then the Dungeon Master for Exandria Unlimited: Divergence (2025) which focused on mortals rebuilding the world after the destruction of the Calamity as the Prime Deities construct the Divine Gate which will remove all gods from Exandria.

For Campaign 4, Mulligan took over Game Master duties from Mercer, with Mercer switching to a player-role. The campaign is set in a new world, Aramán, rather than the Exandria setting used in the previous three campaigns.

=== Alexander Ward ===
Alexander Ward in 2026

Ward previously appeared in Exandria Unlimited: Divergence (2025). He then joined the main cast for Campaign 4. Ward plays as Occtis Tachonis, a young human necromancer wizard from the noble Sundered House of Tachonis. He has an animal companion named Pincushion, an undead fox made of parts from multiple foxes. After Occtis is murdered by his family, he returns as a Hollow One. (Note: A Hollow One is a type of revenant from the sourcebook Explorer's Guide to Wildemount (2020) which introduced game mechanics for "those who were resurrected through strange necromantic magic".)

=== Luis Carazo ===
Luis Carazo in 2026

Carazo previously appeared in Exandria Unlimited: Calamity (2022). He then joined the main cast for Campaign 4. Carazo plays as Azune Nayar, a human aladin/sorcerer. Azune is an Arcane Marshal in the Revolutionary Guard of Dol-Makjar. During the Falconer's Rebellion, he fought alongside Kattigan, Thjazi, and Teor.

=== Whitney Moore ===
Whitney Moore in 2026

Moore previously appeared in the promotional one-shot episode "Delve into Dawnshore" (2025). Moore then joined the main cast for Campaign 4. Moore plays as Tyranny, a demon warlock who recently arrived on the mortal plane. She is an Aspirant in the Candescent Creed, serving under Wick and also acts as his bodyguard.

== Guest cast ==
Guest players are an irregular occurrence on Critical Role and, in most cases, only stay on the show for a one-off appearance or a few consecutive episodes. Only a few guests (Mary Elizabeth McGlynn, Will Friedle and Patrick Rothfuss in campaign one, as well as Khary Payton in campaign two) have appeared in non-consecutive episodes, with their respective characters playing an active role in different parts of the overall storyline. Chris Perkins is the only guest to appear in multiple campaigns. He has a guest role in both of the first two campaigns, playing a different character in each.

=== Campaign 1 ===
- Felicia Day as Lyra a human wizard. She helps Scanlan, Percy, Vex, and Grog during a mission given by the hunters' guild she is a member of—the Slayer's Take—to kill a white dragon named Rimefang.
- Mary Elizabeth McGlynn as Zahra Hydris, a tiefling warlock. Part of the party tasked with hunting down Rimefang. Zahra also recurred in fighting the Chroma Conclave and Vecna. Becomes the love interest of, fellow guest PC, Kashaw Vesh.
- Will Friedle as Kashaw Vesh a human cleric. He is tasked to aid Keyleth, Vax'ildan, and Tiberius in their hunt for a Rakshasa—a tiger–like fiend. Kashaw returned in the Chroma Conclave and Venca arcs. Becomes the love interest of, fellow guest PC, Zahra Hydris.
- Wil Wheaton as Thorbir Falbek, a dwarven fighter. A veteran member of the Slayer's Take, with seemingly poor luck. He is also party of the party tasked with hunting down the Rakshasa.
- Kit Buss as Lillith Anioska Daturai, a tiefling spellcaster. Zahra's cousin, who helps the party to defeat the Briarwoods.
- Jason C. Miller as Garthok, a half-orc rogue. He is a member of the thieves' guild, the Clasp.
- Chris Hardwick as Gern Blanston, a dragonborn necromancer travelling with a number of raised thralls. It is his flying broom that Vex steals.
- Chris Perkins as Shale, a goliath fighter, and a member of the Herd of Storms – the tribe Grog was once a member of. She aids Vox Machina in the fight against the black dragon, Umbrasyl, in the Chroma Conclave arc.
- Patrick Rothfuss as Kerrek, a human paladin. In his initial appearance he is a retired adventurer, turned blacksmith, and spokesperson of the refugees from Westruun. He later returns to aid Vox Machina, and it is Kerrek who lands the final blow on Raishan—the green dragon of the Chroma Conclave.
- ND Stevenson as Tova, a dwarven, and were-bear, blood hunter. Vox Machina aid Tova escape imprisonment in the City of Dis, in The Nine Hells, by helping her kill a pit fiend called Utugash.
- Jon Heder as Lionel "Chod" Gayheart, a half-orc bard and barbarian. He is a bodyguard hired by Scanlan during his time in Marquet.
- Darin De Paul as Ethrid "Sprigg" Brokenbranch, a gnome rogue.
- Joe Manganiello as Arkhan the Cruel, a dragonborn paladin barbarian. A follower of Tiamat; Arkan aids the party in the defeat of Vecna. Rather than destroying the Hand of Vecna, however, he steals it and vanishes before the party can react.

=== Campaign 2 ===
- Khary Payton as Shakäste, a human cleric who aids the party as they investigate a gnoll attack in Alfield.
- Mara Holmes as Calianna, a half-elf sorcerer who enlists the party to help her find and destroy an artifact.
- Ashly Burch as Keg, a dwarven fighter. A former slaver, who helps the Mighty Nein defeat the Iron Shepherds—her previous employers—after Fjord, Jester, and Yasha are abducted.
- Sumalee Montano as Nila, a firbolg druid. She is searching for her partner and son who were taken captive by the Iron Shepherds
- Deborah Ann Woll as Twiggy, a gnome arcane trickster who stows away aboard the party's ship with a dangerous relic.
- Chris Perkins as Spurt, a kobold inventor who joins the party as they cross into Xhorhas and dies within minutes of his introduction to the Mighty Nein.
- Mica Burton as Reani, an aasimar druid and self-styled protector of Uthodurn who aids the party in their quest to re-forge a legendary sword.

=== Campaign 3 ===
- Erika Ishii as Yu Suffiad, (Note: They originally presented themselves as an elf named Dusk.) a changeling warlock/paladin who works for Sorrowlord Zathuda, Grove Captain of the Unseelie Court. They were tasked with hunting down Fearne's parents and recovering an object which they stole.
- Christian Navarro as F.R.I.D.A. (Far Ranging Integrated Defense Aeormaton), an automaton fighter/rogue/cleric with ancient Aeorian design who is a companion of Deanna. Similar to FCG, they were brought back to life by a mysterious figure known as "D".
- Aimee Carrero as Deni$e Bembachula, a dwarf barbarian/rogue from Tal'Dorei who was mysteriously teleported to Issylra during the Apogee Solstice at the same moment that she found her ex-fiance Dariax, a character played by Mercer in Exandria Unlimited. After discovering that Dariax is desolate in Westruun, she acquires transportation there.
- Utkarsh Ambudkar as Bor'Dor Dog'Son, a half-elf sorcerer of the Ruby Vanguard who was teleported to Issylra during the Apogee Solstice near the other party members. He murdered a farmer, burned his body, and stole his clothes to delude the party into thinking he is a simple sheep farmer. After his lies are discovered, he is killed by Laudna in revenge.
- Emily Axford as Prism Grimpoppy, a shadar-kai wizard originally from the Shadowfell who was an apprentice mage at the Cobalt Soul. She was tasked by the Cobalt Soul to do a survey on experiences during the Apogee Solstice; the Cobalt Soul knew she would be transported. She also has a raven familiar named Mother in honor of the Matron of Ravens. After travelling with members of Bells Hells for a time, she decides not to return to the Cobalt Soul and steal books for Bells Hells.

== See also ==
- Candela Obscura
- Critical Role Productions
