= Barbarian (Dungeons & Dragons) =

Dungeons & Dragons character class

- Dungeons & Dragons character class

Editions
- Standard class: 3rd; v3.5; 5th; 5.5e
- Alternate class: 2nd; 4th
- Prestige or subclass: 1st

Publication history
- First appearance: Dragon #63
- Source books: Unearthed Arcana (1985); The Complete Fighter's Handbook; Player's Handbook (2000, 2003, 2014, 2024); Player's Handbook 2

Inspiration
- Based on: Barbarian

Grouping
- 1E base class: Fighter
- 2E group: Warrior
- 4E powersource: Primal
- 4E role: Striker

The barbarian is a playable character class in the Dungeons & Dragons fantasy role-playing game. The class was introduced in 1985 and went through a number of variations in subsequent editions of the game.

== Publication history ==
=== Creative origins ===
The barbarian is based on Robert E. Howard's Conan the Barbarian, Gardner Fox's Kothar and to a lesser extent Fritz Lieber's Fafhrd. An illustration of a barbarian appeared already in the original publication of the original 1974 Dungeons & Dragons set, drawing inspiration from a panel depicting Nick Fury in Strange Tales.

=== Advanced Dungeons & Dragons 1st edition ===
The first official barbarian as a character class was introduced by Gary Gygax in Dragon #63 (July 1982), as a sub-class of the fighter class. The barbarian later appears in the Advanced Dungeons & Dragons manual, Unearthed Arcana in 1985. The barbarian, along with the cavalier, received a revision in Dragon magazine #148 (August 1989), as the author David Howery felt that the class as described in Unearthed Arcana was "too powerful and too vaguely defined."

Another version of the barbarian appeared as a character class in the original Oriental Adventures in 1985. According to a reviewer for White Dwarf, the barbarian was "altered to fit into an Eastern pattern", and was "primarily a steppes warrior, or a forest and jungle dweller".

=== Advanced Dungeons & Dragons 2nd edition ===
Barbarians appear in The Complete Fighter's Handbook as a character kit, and later receive full attention as a stand-alone class in The Complete Barbarian's Handbook. It was added alongside the berserker class, which would become a subclass of barbarian in 5th edition.

=== Dungeons & Dragons 3rd edition ===
Barbarian is one of the base character classes presented in the Player's Handbook. The barbarian is seen as the archetypal warrior who uses brute strength and raw fury to excel in combat, instead of the honed skills of the Fighter or measured strength of the Monk. Of all the classes, only the barbarian begins the game illiterate and is forced to expend extra skill points or multiclass in order to read and write. Half-Orcs have Barbarian as a favored class.

Barbarians can tap their inner fury to fly into a berserker-like rage. Once the rage is expended, the barbarian becomes fatigued for the remainder of the encounter. Rage provides bonuses to Strength, Constitution, and Will saving throws (which can make barbarians surprisingly resistant to harmful magic), and a glut of additional hit points which expire along with their rage. Rage also reduces armour class and interferes with any skill requiring patience or concentration. As barbarians gain in power, their rage can be used more often and provides even larger Strength and Constitution bonuses, while taking less of a toll on their bodies.

The Iconic barbarian is Krusk, a male half-orc.

=== Dungeons & Dragons 4th edition ===
The barbarian appears in the 4th edition as a player character class in Player's Handbook 2 (2009).

As strikers, barbarians are focused on single target damage. Some defender or leader capabilities are also available to the class. Barbarians are proficient in melee weapons and light armor. Barbarians use the primal power source.

Two barbarian builds have been detailed, the Rageblood Barbarian, which focuses on the Rageblood Vigor form of Feral Might, Strength and Constitution and leans towards the defender role, and the Thaneborn Barbarian, which focuses on Strength, Charisma and a different form of Feral Might, and leans towards the leader role. Barbarians' powers are called Evocations.

The Rageblood Berserker paragon path was first presented in the 2008 preview for Player's Handbook 2. The Player's Handbook 2 has several barbarian paragon paths, including the Bear Warrior, Fearbringer Thane, Frenzied Berserker and Wildrunner.

=== Dungeons & Dragons 5th edition ===
The barbarian is a character class in the Player's Handbook. It encompasses two subclasses, known as primal paths: the Path of the Berserker and the path of the Totem Warrior. The Path of the Berserker archetype heightens a barbarians rage allowing for more savage attacks, while the Totem Warrior imbues them with some animal attributes.

Sword Coast Adventurer's Guide (2015) included the Battlerager, exclusive to dwarves and allowing them to wear and utilise damaging spiked armor.

Xanathar's Guide to Everything (2017) added three more paths: Ancestral Guardian, Storm Herald, and Zealot. The Ancestral Guardian provides supernatural defensive protection to allied creatures, the Storm Herald emits storm-themed auras that damage foes and shield allies when the barbarian's Rage feature is activated, and the Zealot empowers their attacks with divine energy and can be easily brought back from death. Tasha's Cauldron of Everything (2020) added two more paths: Path of the Beast and Path of Wild Magic.

Barbarians focus on defensive power. They have the highest average hit points of any class, and they gain access to a powerful unarmored defense feature. In combat, their rage feature grants them resilience against common damage types, and can be extended by taking or dealing damage.

== Barbarians in specific campaign settings ==
=== Eberron ===
In most Dungeons & Dragons games, the barbarian is represented as a savage, tribal warrior. However, in the Eberron campaign setting, barbarians are more like nomads — while they may not be civilized, they are certainly not savages.

=== Forgotten Realms ===
Barbarians in the Forgotten Realms campaign setting are similar in presentation as the class presented in the core rulebook. Barbarians can be of any race in the Realms, though some are more uncommon than others. Barbarians are described as being confused by the cosmopolitan nature of certain regions of Faerûn.

== Reception ==
In the book The Evolution of Fantasy Role-Playing Games (2014), Michael Tresca highlighted that the class used the highest hit dice, a d12, of any class in the second and third editions. Tresca wrote, "the early version of the barbarian emulated Conan in all his aspects [...]. However, the barbarian's failure to embrace magic items was a fundamental weakness in the long-term viability of the character. The Dungeons & Dragons advancement system was as much about the acquisition of magical items as it was about personal power through leveling. [...] The barbarian changed significantly in the first edition Unearthed Arcana, which elaborated on the class' restrictions and improved its combat abilities to compensate".

Screen Rant rated the barbarian class as the 8th most powerful class of the base 12 character classes in the 5th edition.

The Gamer rated the 5th edition barbarian subclass Path Of The Zealot as the 2nd most awesome subclass out of the 32 new character options in Xanathar’s Guide to Everything.

Gus Wezerek, for FiveThirtyEight, reported that of the 5th edition "class and race combinations per 100,000 characters that players created on D&D Beyond from" August 15 to September 15, 2017, barbarians were the fourth most created at 9,063 total. Goliath (1,729) were the most common racial combination followed by half-orc (1,709) and then human (1,435).
