= Heroes of the Fallen Lands =

Dungeons & Dragons sourcebook

- Genre: Role-playing game
- Publisher: Wizards of the Coast
- Publication date: 2010
- Media type: Print
- ISBN: 978-0786956203

Heroes of the Fallen Lands is a supplement to the 4th edition of the Dungeons & Dragons role-playing game.

== Contents ==
Heroes of the Fallen Lands includes new builds and character options for the cleric, fighter, rogue, and wizard classes. Each class comes with a set of new powers, class features, paragon paths, epic destinies, and more that beginning and experienced players can use to build their characters. In addition to new builds, this book presents expanded information and racial traits for some of the game's races, including dwarves, eladrin, elves, halflings, and humans.

== Publication history ==
Heroes of the Fallen Lands was written by Andy Collins, Jeremy Crawford, Mike Mearls, Stephen Schubert, Bill Slavicsek, Rodney Thompson, and James Wyatt, and published in 2010. The book features art by Eric Belisle, Leon Cortez, Eric Deschamps, Yasuyo Dunnett, Emrah Elmasli, Wayne England, Jason Engle, Carl Frank, David Griffith, Brian Hagan, Ralph Horsley, Tyler Jacobson, Kekai Kotaki, Howard Lyon, Lee Moyer, Jim Nelson, William O'Connor, Eric Polak, Chris Seaman, Keven Smith, John Stanko, Anne Stokes, Francis Tsai, Eva Widermann, and Ben Wootten.

Shannon Appelcline commented on Essentials, the last significant expansion in 2010 for Fourth Edition Dungeons & Dragons: "Trade paperbacks like Heroes of the Fallen Lands (2010) offered rules for a variety of character classes in a trade paperback that was about half the price of one of fourth edition’s hardcover books; while other boxed sets like Monster Vault (2010) added to the board-game like components of 4e by including not just a book of monsters but also tokens to represent those monsters in-game. Besides making D&D cheaper and simpler for new players, Essentials also walked back some of the changes made by the 4e rules, such as getting rid of fighters' daily powers, to once more increase the differentiation between fighter and spellcaster classes."

== Reception ==
Scott Wachter of RPGamer wrote "This book could have been a fantastic introduction to fourth edition D&D, but as it stands it feels like two-thirds of a game manual and one-sixth marketing ploy, which is still adds up to being an incomplete product. If you are completely new to gaming this is a good point to get a feel for how it works, but if you're just looking to get your feet wet with 4e, you may as well go straight for the deep end with a real Players Handbook."
