= Character class (Dungeons & Dragons) =

Game character aspect

A character class is a fundamental part of the identity and nature of characters in the Dungeons & Dragons role-playing game. A character's capabilities, strengths, and weaknesses are largely defined by their class; choosing a class is one of the first steps a player takes to create a Dungeons & Dragons player character. A character's class affects a character's available skills and abilities. A well-rounded party of characters requires a variety of abilities offered by the classes found within the game.

Dungeons & Dragons was the first game to introduce the usage of character classes to role-playing. Many other traditional role-playing games and massively multiplayer online role-playing games have since adopted the concept as well. Dungeons & Dragons classes have generally been defined in the Player's Handbook, one of the three core rulebooks; a variety of alternate classes have also been defined in supplemental sourcebooks.

== Types of classes ==
=== Principal base classes ===
These base classes have appeared as character classes in the core rulebooks of multiple editions of Dungeons & Dragons:

- Barbarian
- Bard
- Cleric
- Druid
- Fighter
- Monk
- Paladin
- Ranger
- Rogue
- Sorcerer
- Warlock
- Wizard

=== Alternative base classes ===
While the main character classes available have remained fairly consistent since the 1st Edition of Advanced Dungeons & Dragons, a variety of alternate base classes have been offered in supplemental books. The release of Unearthed Arcana in 1985, for instance, introduced the base class of Barbarian and reworked Paladins to be a type of the new base class "Cavalier". Oriental Adventures (1985) also introduced a number of alternate classes more appropriate for an Eastern setting. The 2nd Edition added several completely new base classes (e.g. Runecaster and Shaman); in addition, supplemental handbooks offered a variety of "kits" to customize each base class, and the Dungeon Master's Guide offered rules for creating new character classes. The 3rd Edition introduced five classes for use in creating non-player characters in its Dungeon Master's Guide. v3.5 Edition introduced the Artificer as a new standalone class for the Eberron campaign setting and it has continued to appear as an alternative class in the subsequent 4th and 5th Editions.

Non-core base classes are considered optional and do not always exist in all settings. For example, the Samurai class introduced in the Oriental Adventures book may not make sense in a game set in a standard European-style realm. Similarly, classes associated with psionics such as the Psychic Warrior do not apply to worlds without psionics.

=== Multiclassing ===
Most editions of Dungeons & Dragons have allowed for the possibility to either advance in more than one class simultaneously, alternately taking levels in more than one class, or branching out in a second (or more) class at a specific point defined by the first class, a concept generally called "multiclassing".

In the 1st and 2nd editions, changing a character's class is difficult. Only those playing as humans can, and it requires extremely high stats to do so. This is called "dual-classing". Non-humans, on the other hand, can "multiclass" where they effectively learn two (and rarely even three) classes at the same time at the cost of slower level progression for that character.

The 3rd edition allows players to mix and match levels from any number of classes, though certain combinations are more effective than others. In addition, Prestige classes add more options for multiclassing. This edition offers the most freedom regarding multiclassing. There are, however, penalties to the rate of experience point gained if classes are added haphazardly. The 3rd edition version of Unearthed Arcana includes rules for gestalt characters which combine the advantages of two classes.

The 4th edition allows characters to take a feat that grants access to specific facets of another class. The class-specific multiclass feats are also prerequisites for the power-swap feats, each of which allows the character to swap out a daily, encounter, or utility power from their first class for one from their second class. Also, at level 11, a character with a multiclass feat and all of the power-swap feats is eligible for paragon multiclassing, which allows them to gain additional powers from their second class in lieu of taking a Paragon Path. Some classes are only available through multiclassing; the first such class was Spellscarred, introduced in the Forgotten Realms Player's Guide. In the 4th Edition, each character can only multiclass into a single class, unless otherwise stated by their primary class (such as the Bard). The Player's Handbook III introduced "hybrid" classes, a deeper form of multiclassing in which elements of two classes are combined each level.

In the 5th edition, multiclassing requires minimum ability scores before it can be chosen; however, the requirements are not as steep as in previous editions. The core classes only require an ability score of 13 or greater in the specific requisite score, except for the Monk, Paladin and Ranger (who need 13s in two stats).

== D&D original version ==
Original Dungeons & Dragons classes
Source	Classes
Book I: Men and Magic	Cleric; Fighting-Man; Magic-User
Supplement I: Greyhawk	Paladin; Thief
Supplement II: Blackmoor	Assassin; Monk
Supplement III: Eldritch Wizardry	Druid

In the original Dungeons & Dragons boxed set, there are only three main classes: the Cleric, the Fighting-Man, and the Magic-User. The first supplement, Greyhawk, added the Thief as a fourth main class, as well as the Paladin as a Fighting-Man subclass. These four fantasy gaming archetypes represent four major tactical roles in play: the Fighter offers direct combat strength and durability; the Thief offers cunning and stealth; the Cleric provides support in both combat and magic; and the Magic-User has a variety of magical powers. In many ways, other classes are thought of as alternatives that refine or combine these functions.

Each of the playable races have different amounts of access to the classes. Dwarves can be Fighters or Fighter/Thieves, with Fighter/Cleric possible for NPCs. Halflings are restricted to the Fighting Man and Thief classes. Elves are restricted to Fighter/Magic-User, Fighter/Magic-User/Thief, and Thief class options, with Fighter/Magic-User/Cleric an option for elven NPCs. Half-Elves (introduced in Greyhawk) can be Fighter/Magic-Users, Fighter/Magic-User/Clerics, or Thieves. All four non-human races have limited level advancement except in the Thief class. Humans can be any single class with no level restriction.

== AD&D 1st edition ==
1st Edition classes
Class	Sub-classes
Player's Handbook
Bard*	—
Cleric	Druid
Fighter	Paladin; Ranger
Magic-User	Illusionist
Monk	—
Thief	Assassin
Unearthed Arcana
Cavalier	Paladin (variant)
(Fighter)	Barbarian
(Thief)	Acrobat*
Oriental Adventures
(Cavalier)	Samurai
(Cleric)	Shukenja; Sohei
(Fighter)	Kensai; Barbarian (variant); Bushi
(Magic-user)	Wu Jen
Monk (variant)	–
(Thief)	Ninja*; Yakuza
Dragonlance Adventures
(Cavalier)	Crown Knight*; Sword Knight*; Rose Knight*
Tinker	―
Wizard of High Sorcery	White Robe*; Red Robe*; Black Robe*
(Cleric)	Good; Neutrality; Evil
* Cannot start at 1st level; functions like a prestige class in later editions.

Advanced Dungeons & Dragons loosened the restrictions on race and class combinations, although non-human races often have restricted choices among classes and maximum levels they can reach in a class. Additional classes that had first appeared in supplements and articles in The Strategic Review magazine are included as base classes. The Player's Handbook also introduced the bard as a sixth class; however, its usage in first edition is more akin to what would be called a prestige class in later editions, as it was not a legal choice for a starting character. Instead, a character has to start as a fighter, change classes to a thief, and finally switch classes once more to become a bard.

A character's ability scores directly tie into what class choices are legal for them. For instance, a character wishing to be a fighter requires at least 9 strength; the more discriminating monk requires 15 strength, 15 wisdom, 15 dexterity, and 11 constitution. Unusually high or low ability scores can proscribe class choice further; "too high" an intelligence can prohibit being a fighter, while a charisma of 5 or less will require the character to become an assassin. High ability scores in statistics considered pertinent to the class will grant an experience bonus.

The Player's Handbook brought about other changes in the game and its character classes. Fighters, clerics, and thieves have increased hit dice compared to the original edition. The book also made changes to how the strength score of a character affects their chances to hit in combat and cause damage, as well as how much weight they can carry, and the roll to open doors successfully. A higher intelligence score grants an increased chance for both knowledge of spells and ability to learn languages. A higher wisdom score grants clerics a bonus to their spells, while low wisdom imposes a possibility that their spells will fail. New charts detail the effects of the constitution, dexterity, and charisma scores for characters. Each of the five main character classes and five sub-classes have its own table for charting gains on experience points; for most of these classes it now required more experience points than before to reach beyond third or fourth levels. The book also introduced multiclassed characters to the game.

Unearthed Arcana added the Cavalier, Barbarian, and Thief-Acrobat classes.

== D&D Basic Set ==
Dungeons & Dragons Basic Set classes
Category	Classes
Human classes	Cleric; Fighter; Magic User; Thief
Demi-human classes	Dwarf; Elf; Halfling; Gnome*
High-level classes	Avenger*; Druid*; Knight*; Mystic*; Paladin*
* Introduced in supplemental rules.

The second version of the Dungeons & Dragons Basic Set combines the idea of race and class; non-human races do not have classes. Hence, a character might be a (human) Cleric or else simply an "Elf" or "Dwarf". The Basic Set presented four human classes: Cleric, Fighter, Magic User, and Thief, and three demi-human classes: Dwarf, Elf, and Halfling. The Companion Set introduced four optional classes for high-level characters: the Avenger, Paladin, and Knight for Fighters, and the Druid for Clerics. The Master Set introduced one additional class: the Mystic. The Rules Cyclopedia includes in its final pages instructions on modifying the Halfling class into a Gnome class, adding that as an option. The Creature Crucible series (Tall Tales of the Wee Folk, Top Ballista, The Sea People, Night Howlers) is about other racial classes, and Gazetteer series includes many optional classes for humans and non-humans, including the shaman (GAZ12) and shamani (GAZ14). Additional human and race classes are also presented in other supplements.

== AD&D 2nd edition ==
Classes in 2nd edition Dungeons & Dragons
Group	Player's Handbook	Supplements
Warrior	Fighter; Paladin; Ranger	Barbarian; Berserker; Runecaster
Wizard	Mage; Specialist wizard	Alchemist; Artificer; Dimensionalist; Elementalist; Force mage; Geomancer; Mentalist; Shadow mage; Song mage; Wild mage
Priest	Cleric; Specialist priest; Druid	Crusader; Monk; Shaman; Manteis
Rogue	Thief; Bard	Ninja
―	―	Psionicist; Shaman

The second edition of Advanced Dungeons & Dragons attempted to streamline what had become a hodgepodge of rules that only applied in specific cases in 1st edition. As such, it sought to simplify the rules and straighten out contradictions. Character classes are divided into four groups or "metaclasses": Warrior, Wizard, Priest, and Rogue. Each of these groups has a "base" class which only requires at least a 9 in the "prime requisite" ability in Fighter, Mage, Cleric, and Thief; these were intended to be playable in any setting. The Player's Handbook goes on to say that "all of the other classes are optional". Each group of classes has the same hit dice (determining hit point growth), THAC0 progression, and saving throw table. Second edition maintains minimums in certain statistics to qualify for some classes, but removes many of the other restrictions such as one extremely low ability forcing a character into a specific class.

The bard class was changed to be a normal class that can be chosen at character creation. The assassin and monk classes were removed from the second edition Player's Handbook. The Dungeon Master's Guide clarifies the rationale behind the decision in a section on creating new character classes:

What is a Viking but a fighter with a certain outlook on life and warfare? A witch is really nothing but a female wizard. A vampire hunter is only a title assumed by a character of any class who is dedicated to the destruction and elimination of those loathsome creatures.

The same is true of assassins. Killing for profit requires no special powers, only a specific reprehensible outlook. Choosing the title does not imply any special powers or abilities. The character just uses his current skills to fulfill a specific, personal set of goals.

— Dungeon Master's Guide, 2nd edition

Supplemental books/sets introduced new classes. The barbarian returned as a class in the Complete Barbarian's Handbook which also introduced the shaman. The berserker and the runecaster classes appeared in the Viking's Campaign Sourcebook, and the manteis in the Celts Campaign Sourcebook. The psionicist class was introduced in the Complete Psionics Handbook. Campaign settings also introduced new classes, such as the magician and guilder from Birthright, dragon-related classes from Council of Wyrms, the gladiator and trader from Dark Sun, and the anchorite and arcanist from Ravenloft.

=== Kits and specialisations ===
Class-specific supplements for second edition introduced a number of additional class modifications called kits, which allow players to create characters with particular themes without having to introduce additional classes. The assassin, barbarian, and monk were re-implemented in such fashion (although some kits were expanded to full classes in supplements).

The second edition has two unified spell groups, one for wizard spells and another for priest spells. These lists are further subdivided by school of magic and sphere of influence, respectively. Different classes have access to different schools or spheres, allowing for each class to have distinct spell lists. The illusionist class from first edition, for example, became a type of specialist wizard; specialists gained the ability to cast extra spells of their chosen school of magic in exchange for the inability to cast spells of "opposed" schools; an illusionist will gain extra spells per day in the school of illusion, but will be denied access to the schools of abjuration, necromancy, and evocation.

A similar distinction is made for priests. Second edition introduced priests of a specific mythology who will gain their own specific abilities, restrictions, and sphere of influence selection. The druid was provided as an example; the specification of other speciality priests is left to dungeon masters and setting books. As an example, a specialty priest of Tempus, the god of war in the Forgotten Realms campaign setting, can incite a berserker rage in allies and lacks the "only blunt weapons" restriction of normal clerics. The selection of spheres of influence works similarly to the allowed and forbidden schools of magic.

== D&D 3rd edition ==
Classes in 3rd edition Dungeons & Dragons
Source	Classes
Player's Handbook	Barbarian; Bard; Cleric; Druid; Fighter; Monk; Paladin; Ranger; Rogue; Sorcerer; Wizard
Player's Handbook II	Beguiler; Dragon Shaman; Duskblade; Knight
Complete series	Ardent; Divine Mind; Favored Soul; Hexblade; Lurk; Ninja; Samurai; Scout; Shugenja; Spellthief; Spirit Shaman; Swashbuckler; Warlock; Warmage; Wu Jen
Setting-specific	Artificer (Eberron); Eidolon, Eidoloncer (Ghostwalk); Mystic, Noble (Dragonlance); Shaman, Sohei (Oriental Adventures)
Other	Archivist; Binder; Crusader; Dread Necromancer; Factotum; Healer; Incarnate; Marshal; Psion; Psychic Warrior; Shadowcaster; Soulborn; Soulknife; Swordsage; Totemist; Truenamer; Warblade; Wilder

The 3rd edition abolished the practice of grouping classes directly, allowing hit dice, attack bonus, and saving throws to vary for each particular class again. 3rd edition also saw the return of the Monk as a base class, the creation of the new Sorcerer class, and the inclusion of Barbarian as a base Player's Handbook class, previously described in 1st edition's Unearthed Arcana rules and as an optional kit in 2nd edition. Ability requirements on classes and experience bonuses were abolished, though a low score in an ability that is important to a class would still adversely affect a character in it.

3rd edition allows for a much more fluid idea of multiclassing than earlier editions, as one unified experience-points-per-level table was made. Rather than earlier editions' rules on splitting experience, characters can simply choose which class they wish to take a new level in and add the appropriate bonus from the class.

Prestige classes were also introduced in the 3rd edition's Dungeon Master's Guide, with new classes only available at higher levels and after meeting several prerequisites.

In addition to the eleven classes presented in the PHB, various alternate base classes were presented in supplements, and the Dungeon Master's Guide presented five weaker classes designed for NPCs (the adept, aristocrat, commoner, expert, and warrior). Low-level humanoid monsters, such as goblins, have levels in an NPC class instead of racial hit dice.

In addition to class variants for the eleven core classes, many of the supplemental books introduce new base classes that can be taken from first level or multiclassed into, such as the Warlock from Complete Arcane. Some of these books also present prestige classes which have entry requirements only accessible by taking levels in the base classes described in those books (e.g. the Soulcaster prestige class requires the soulmelding class ability, only offered by the three classes in Magic of Incarnum).

=== Prestige classes ===
Prestige classes were introduced in 3rd edition as a further means of individualizing a character. They expand upon the form of multiclassing and are inaccessible at first level, specifically meant to be multiclassed into from the base classes. To attain a specific prestige class, a character must first meet a number of prerequisites, such as certain feats or membership in a specific organization. Prestige classes offer a focus on different abilities that may be difficult to attain otherwise; for example, the 3rd edition version of the Assassin prestige class grants minor magical powers, more sneak attack damage, and better usage of poison.

The 3rd edition Dungeon Master's Guide included prestige classes such as the Arcane Archer, Blackguard, Mystic Theurge, and Shadowdancer, while the 3.5 revision additionally included classes such as the Arcane Trickster, Archmage, Dragon Disciple, and Duelist. Many other sourcebooks introduced additional prestige classes, such as the Bladesinger in Tome and Blood; Blighter, Geomancer, Shifter, Verdant Lord in Masters of the Wild; Divine Champion in Forgotten Realms Campaign Setting; Cerebremancer and Elocater in Expanded Psionics Handbook; Fochlucan Lyrist in Complete Adventurer; and Chameleon in Races of Destiny. Some of these classes were readjusted for balance in the 3.5 revision of the game.

== D&D 4th edition ==
Classes in 4th edition
Class	Power source	Role
Player's Handbook
Cleric	Divine	Leader
Fighter	Martial	Defender
Paladin	Divine	Defender
Ranger	Martial	Striker
Rogue	Martial	Striker
Warlock	Arcane	Striker
Warlord	Martial	Leader
Wizard	Arcane	Controller
Player's Handbook 2
Avenger	Divine	Striker
Barbarian	Primal	Striker
Bard	Arcane	Leader
Druid	Primal	Controller
Invoker	Divine	Controller
Shaman	Primal	Leader
Sorcerer	Arcane	Striker
Warden	Primal	Defender
Player's Handbook 3
Ardent	Psionic	Leader
Battlemind	Psionic	Defender
Monk	Psionic	Striker
Psion	Psionic	Controller
Runepriest	Divine	Leader
Seeker	Primal	Controller
Eberron Player's Guide
Artificer	Arcane	Leader
Forgotten Realms Player's Guide
Swordmage	Arcane	Defender
Dragon magazine
Assassin	Shadow	Striker
Heroes of Shadow
Vampire	Shadow	Striker

The 4th edition heavily retooled the class system in favor of a more unified set of mechanics for characters, which was in part intended to reduce some of the perceived imbalance between spellcasters and non-spellcasters in the 3rd edition. Classes can be defined as the combination of a character role with a power source and are differentiated by what active-use class features and powers they give, all of which follow the same pattern of at-will, once per encounter, once daily, and utility powers.

The 4th edition Player's Handbook does not include some classes from 3rd edition, such as the Barbarian, Bard, Druid, Monk, and Sorcerer (though these classes returned in the second and third volumes of the Player's Handbook), but does include the Warlock (originally introduced in the 3.5 edition sourcebook Complete Arcane) and Warlord (originally introduced as the Marshal in the 3rd edition Miniatures Handbook) which had not appeared in the Player's Handbook in previous editions. Twenty-six classes were released in total.

Different classes draw on different power sources for their abilities. The power sources used by the Player's Handbook classes are arcane, divine, and martial. Arcane classes gain magical energy from the cosmos, divine classes receive their power from the gods, and martial classes draw power from training and willpower. The Player's Handbook 2 introduces the primal power source, which draws power from the spirits of the natural world and features transformation as a theme. Dragon No. 379 included the Assassin class, introducing the shadow power source. The Player's Handbook 3 introduced the psionic power source, which draws power from the mind. Player's Option: Heroes of the Elemental Chaos introduced builds that use the elemental power source.

Characters of a given class are said to fill a particular character role in the party, especially in combat. Leaders are focused on buffing and healing allies. Controllers focus on affecting multiple targets at once, either damaging or debuffing them, or altering the battlefield's terrain. Defenders focus on blocking attacking enemies or drawing their attacks to themselves and are typically focused on melee combat. Strikers are focused on mobility, dealing heavy damage to single targets and avoiding attacks. A character may fill secondary roles depending primarily on their choice of powers; for example, a Fighter may have Controller as a secondary role by choosing powers that subject enemies to forced movement. While some Leader and Striker classes and builds are focused towards either melee or ranged combat, the roles as a whole are not.

=== Paragon paths and epic destinies ===
The optional prestige classes from earlier editions were replaced by paragon paths and epic destinies as methods of character customization. Each character may choose a paragon path upon reaching the paragon tier at level 11 and an epic destiny upon reaching the epic tier at level 21.

Paragon paths are often (though not always) class-specific, and some have additional prerequisites. Other paragon paths are restricted to members of a certain race or are associated with a nation or faction in a campaign setting. Paragon paths generally expand on a character's existing abilities. For example, fighter paragon paths improve a character's toughness, resilience, or damage with melee weapons.

Epic destinies generally have looser prerequisites than paragon paths; many are available to multiple classes, and some, such as Demigod and Eternal Seeker, have 21st level as their only prerequisite. Each epic destiny includes at least one way in which a character can establish a legacy and at least one way in which a character can retire. Most epic destinies provide fewer benefits than paragon paths, but the benefits that they provide are far more powerful. A common feature of an epic destiny is to allow characters to (usually once per day) return to life or otherwise continue to function after dying.

Unlike prestige classes, a character may only take a single paragon path and a single epic destiny, and path and destiny advancement is in addition to class advancement rather than being in lieu of it.

== D&D 5th edition ==
Classes in the 5th edition are mechanically and thematically similar to the versions in the 3rd edition. Classes gain new abilities as they reach each level, allowing them to combat stronger monsters and more difficult perilous situations, but unlike 4th edition, lower-level opponents remain threatening as power levels do not scale in tandem.

There are 12 classes included in the 5th edition Player's Handbook (2014). The campaign setting book Eberron: Rising from the Last War (2019) introduced the Artificer as a new class for the edition; it was later revised in the sourcebook Tasha's Cauldron of Everything (2020). The Player's Handbook (2024), as part of the 2024 revision to the 5th Edition ruleset, updates all preexisting classes from the Player's Handbook (2014); it also includes revised versions of some subclasses. In light of the 2024 changes, Player's Handbook (2024) lead designer Jeremy Crawford suggested that "players familiar with the rules should start their campaigns at 3rd level so they have access to both core class abilities and subclass abilities" from the start.

=== Subclasses ===
Each class in the Player's Handbook (2014) has multiple subclasses, which allow players to choose an archetype of their class they want to follow (e.g. the Berserker Barbarian, the Evoker Wizard, the Wild Magic Sorcerer, the Beastmaster Ranger, etc.), chosen at 3rd level or earlier. This archetype defines many of the abilities that the class receives. The Dungeon Master's Guide (2014) includes two nonstandard subclass options for evil characters that are only allowed in the game by permission of the Dungeon Master: the Death Cleric and the Oathbreaker Paladin.

Additional subclasses have been added to the game with the publication of various sourcebooks and campaign guidebooks, for example, in supplements such as the Sword Coast Adventurer's Guide (2015), Xanathar's Guide to Everything (2017) and Tasha's Cauldron of Everything (2020). Some classes from earlier editions were included in 5th edition as subclasses, like assassin, psi warrior, scout, and war mage. Several other subclasses had appeared in previous editions as kits, prestige classes, or paragon paths; this is especially true of setting-specific classes or ones with unique flavor, like arcane trickster, bladesinger, drunken master, Purple Dragon knight, and Samurai.

Christian Hoffer of ComicBook.com explained that in the original 5th Edition ruleset the Cleric, Druid, Sorcerer, Warlock, and Wizard classes gained "access to their subclass at either 1st or 2nd Level. A large reason for this is how those classes are presented in the lore" such as the Cleric or Warlock respectively declaring their god or otherworldly patron at the first level. He highlighted that the 2024 update standardizes subclass progression with all classes now picking "their subclass at 3rd level, along with other shifts as to when players gain subclass features at higher levels".

Subclasses in 5th Edition
Base class	Player's Handbook (2014)	Xanathar's Guide to Everything	Tasha's Cauldron of Everything	Other sourcebooks (Note: Includes Fizban's Treasury of Dragons (2021), Bigby Presents: Glory of the Giants (2023), Player's Handbook (2024), and Arcana Unleashed (2026).)	Setting-specific
Barbarian Primal paths	Berserker; Wild Heart (Note: Wild Heart was originally named Totem Warrior.)	Ancestral Guardian (Note: A variant of ancestral guardian was published under 2024 rules under the name Spiritual Guardian.); Storm Herald*; Zealot	Beast*; Wild Magic*	Giant; World Tree	Battlerager* (Note: From the Forgotten Realms campaign setting. Published in Sword Coast Adventurer's Guide (2015) and/or Heroes of Faerûn (2025)); Elements (Note: From the World of Warcraft campaign setting. Published in Dungeons & Dragons: World of Warcraft (2026).)
Bard Bardic colleges	Lore; Valor	Glamour; Swords*; Whispers*	Creation*; Eloquence*	Dance	Moon; Spirits (Note: From the Ravenloft campaign setting. Published in Van Richten's Guide to Ravenloft (2021) and/or Ravenloft: The Horrors Within (2026).)
Cleric Divine domains	Knowledge; Life; Light; Nature*; Tempest*; Trickery; War	Forge*; Grave	Order*; Peace*; Twilight*	Arcana	Discipline; Shadow
Druid Druid circles	Land; Moon	Dreams*; Shepherd*	Spores*; Stars; Wildfire*	Sea	—N/a
Fighter Martial archetypes	Battle Master; Champion; Eldritch Knight	Arcane Archer; Cavalier*; Samurai*	Psi Warrior; Rune Knight*	—N/a	Echo Knight* (Note: From the Exandria campaign setting first seen in Critical Role. Published in Explorer's Guide to Wildemount (2020).); Purple Dragon Knight
Monk Monastic traditions	Elements (Note: Elements was originally named Four Elements.); Open Hand; Shadow	Drunken Master (Note: A variant of drunken master was published under 2024 rules under the name Warrior of Mystic Brews.); Kensei*; Sun Soul*	Astral Self*; Mercy	Ascendent Dragon*; Mystic Arts	Long Death*
Paladin Sacred oaths	Ancients; Devotion; Vengeance	Conquest*; Redemption*	Glory; Watchers*	—N/a	Crown*; Ebon Blade; Holy; Noble Genies
Ranger Ranger conclaves	Beast Master; Hunter	Gloom Stalker; Horizon Walker*; Monster Slayer*	Fey Wanderer; Swarmkeeper*	Drakewarden*	Demon Hunter; Hollow Warden; Winter Walker
Rogue Roguish archetypes	Arcane Trickster; Assassin; Thief	Inquisitive*; Mastermind*; Scout*; Swashbuckler	Phantom; Soulknife	—N/a	Scion of the Three
Sorcerer Sorcerous origins	Draconic Bloodline; Wild Magic	Divine Soul*; Shadow Magic; Storm Sorcery*	Aberrant Mind; Clockwork Soul	—N/a	Spellfire
Warlock Otherworldly patrons	Archfey; Fiend; Great Old One	Celestial; Hexblade*	Fathomless*; Genie*	Vestige	Undead; Undying*
Wizard Arcane traditions	Abjuration; Conjuration; Divination; Enchantment; Evocation; Illusion; Necromancy; Transmutation	War Magic*	Bladesinger (Note: Bladesinger was originally named Bladesinging.); Order of Scribes*	—N/a	Chronurgy*; Graviturgy*
Artificer Artificer specialists	—N/a	—N/a	Alchemist; Armorer; Artillerist; Battle Smith	—N/a	Cartographer (Note: From the Eberron campaign setting. Published in Eberron: Forge of the Artificer (2025).); Reanimator
* Subclass has only been published under 2014 rules.

== Reception ==
In an article comparing the 1978 Player's Handbook and the 2014 Player's Handbook, James Floyd Kelly, for GeekDad, highlighted that the earlier edition had inconsistencies in leveling across the different character classes. Floyd Kelly wrote: "For all of the classes, the XP chart for leveling varied. Paladins required 350,000XP after level 11, while Fighters only required 250,000XP after the same level. Poor Magic-Users, though... after level 18 each additional level came at a price of 375,000XP while the Illusionist could rock after level 12 with a requirement of only 220,000XP per additional level. Oh, and the Monk had to stop at level 17. No further advancement".

Shannon Appelcline, author of Designers & Dragons, highlighted that while OD&D only had three character classes, "which made it easy to balance a party", "as character classes proliferated in later editions, it became less clear which classes could fill which roles". The 4th Edition classes were designed for specific party roles and these "classes were unified in how they were defined and how they progressed. [...] The difference in the character classes now focused on what powers they had and what they could do". Appelcline wrote that the addition of warlock and warlord to the 4th Edition base classes was "surprising" and "with so many new races and classes, it's not surprising that some classics got dropped. The [...] assassin, bard, and druid were all classics that were missing from the class list. This generated even more controversy, and the designers later said that they regretted not saying that the first Player's Handbook was just a starting place for D&D 4E". In the AV Club's review of the 5th Edition, Samantha Nelson wrote: "Just like in 4th Edition, there are several versions of each class, which provide a high level of diversity in the party. [...] But the different character classes play far more like 3.5 than 4th Edition. [...] Many of the classes have been radically improved. There isn't a single leveling up where the only benefit is a few more hit points. Each new benchmark unlocks some new component of your class, rewarding your dedication to one path over the course of the game's 20 levels".

In SLUG Magazine's review of the 5th Edition Player's Handbook (2014), Henry Glasheen wrote: "I didn't feel like any race was unduly pidgeonholed into one class or another [...]. Classes are deeper now, with more meaningful customization options and a more modest progression. Multiclassing is still available, but it seems like the development team has found a way to balance the overpowered multiclassing opportunities of D&D 3.5 while avoiding the convoluted clusterfuck that was multiclassing in 4th Edition. In most cases, you'll want to stick to your starting class, but there are some interesting multiclass builds that I certainly want to try out". Gus Wezerek, for FiveThirtyEight, reported that of the 5th edition "class and race combinations per 100,000 characters that players created on D&D Beyond from" August 15 to September 15, 2017, fighters were the most created at 13,906 total, followed by rogues (11,307) and wizards (9,855). Druids were the least created at 6,328 total. Wezerek wrote "When I started playing 'Dungeons & Dragons' five years ago, I never would have chosen the game's most popular match: the human fighter. There are already enough human fighters in movies, TV and books — my first character was an albino dragonborn sorcerer. But these days I can get behind the combo's simplicity". Screen Rant rated the wizard class as the most powerful class and the ranger class as the least powerful of the base 12 character classes in 5th Edition.

On the 2024 5th Edition update to class progression, Christian Hoffer of ComicBook.com thought that "while subclass standardization might make sense from a rules and balance perspective, it does unfortunately rob some Dungeons & Dragons of some roleplaying flavor. Almost all of the spellcasting classes feel a bit homogenized at lower levels with this change, although assumedly the different spell lists and the 1st and 2nd level abilities can make up some of this difference". Henry St Leger of GamesRadar+ opined that "the D&D rules revisions seem to be a net improvement to one of the best tabletop RPGs", however, he felt some classes lost "flavorful aspects" in exchange for "utility elsewhere". He stated that "I'm hugely excited to try each of the revised classes for myself, and inevitably there were going to be losses alongside the many gains in this semi-new edition. But some may find that the things that drew them to a class fantasy in the first place have been sidelined – and those players may find themselves missing what they've lost".

== In popular culture ==
=== Television ===
- In the American science fiction horror television series Stranger Things, a Dungeons and Dragons game played by the main characters is one of the first scenes of the show and the game reappears throughout the show. In 2019, Wizards of the Coast released a 5th Edition Stranger Things-themed starter set that includes "five pre-generated characters, one each for the five members of the party as described in Stranger Things Season 2. Fans can step into the shoes of Mike's paladin, Will's cleric, Lucas' ranger, Dustin's bard, and Eleven's wizard".
