= Fighter (Dungeons & Dragons) =

Character class in Dungeons & Dragons

- Dungeons & Dragons character class

Editions
- Standard class: Original; Basic; 1st; 2nd; 3rd; v3.5; 4th; 5th; 5.5e

Publication history
- First appearance: Dungeons & Dragons (1974)
- Source books: Men and Magic; Basic Set; Player's Handbook (1978, 1989, 2000, 2003, 2008, 2014, 2024)
- Previous name: Fighting Man (1st edition)

Grouping
- 1E base class: none
- 2E group: Warrior
- 4E powersource: Martial
- 4E role: Defender

The fighter is one of the standard playable character classes in the Dungeons & Dragons fantasy role-playing game. A fighter is a versatile, weapons-oriented warrior who fights using skill, strategy and tactics.

Fighter is a generic and broad class; individual fighters have diverse backgrounds and different styles. Bodyguards, adventurers, former soldiers, invading bandit kings, or master swordsmen are all fighters, yet they come from all walks of life and backgrounds and often find themselves on very different alignments, goals, and sides in a conflict.

== Publication history ==
=== Dungeons & Dragons ===
The "Fighting Man" was one of the three classes in the original Dungeons & Dragons game; the other two classes were Magic-User and Cleric.

The paladin was introduced in Supplement I - Greyhawk (1975), as a subclass of Fighting Man.

=== Advanced Dungeons & Dragons 1st edition ===
The fighter was one of the standard character classes available in the original Player's Handbook. The fighter was presented as one of the five core classes in the original Players Handbook. In the 1st edition of Advanced Dungeons & Dragons, fighters were the class best suited for physical combat, balanced by the weakness of not having any other ability. Fighters did not typically greatly benefit from high intelligence, wisdom or charisma ability scores; the character could obtain higher scores in strength, dexterity and constitution, which increased combat ability. High hit points (HP), the ability to equip strong armors, and easily the fastest THAC0 progression also helped them in combat. As an optional and very commonly used rule, fighters could also take Weapon Specialization, which offered further bonuses to hit and damage.

In the Players Handbook, the hit dice for the fighter was increased to a d10.

=== Basic Dungeons & Dragons ===
The fighter was available as a character class in the game's "Basic" edition.

=== Advanced Dungeons & Dragons 2nd edition ===
The fighter, as part of the "warrior" group, was one of the standard character classes available in the second edition Player's Handbook. The second edition Player's Handbook gives several examples of famous fighters from legend: Hercules, Perseus, Hiawatha, Beowulf, Siegfried, Cuchulain, Little John, Tristan, and Sinbad. The book also cites a number of great generals and warriors: El Cid, Hannibal, Alexander the Great, Charlemagne, Spartacus, Richard the Lionheart, and Belisarius.

The Complete Fighter's Handbook detailed the fighter class, and several subclasses. The book made an attempt to compensate for this class' lack of special abilities. In addition to offering a variety of kits such as the Swashbuckler, Gladiator, and Noble Warrior the handbook introduced several skills that allowed players to customize their warriors' combative abilities. New rules included group weapon proficiencies, continuing specialization, additional rules for unarmed combat, and the introduction of four different fighting styles (Single Weapon, Two Weapon, Weapon and Shield, and Two Handed Weapon).

=== Dungeons & Dragons 3rd edition ===
In the 3rd edition of the game, the mechanics behind fighters were significantly changed by turning most of their abilities into combat feats (of which the fighter could choose as bonus feats). This allowed fighters to choose between a variety of combat techniques more specialized than brute force.

The Iconic fighter is Regdar.

Fighters did not undergo major overhaul in the 3.5 revision of Dungeons & Dragons compared to 3rd edition. The main change was the addition of the Greater Weapon Focus and Greater Weapon Specialization feats (which both increase their attack power with the selected weapons) becoming exclusively available to fighters. 3.5 has seen additional focus on increasing the depth of the fighter's feat trees, as they are the primary (and only) class feature of fighters.

In 2006, the Player's Handbook II greatly increased the number of feats available to fighters and provided a number of abilities that were, similar to the Weapon Specialization ability, only available to higher level fighters.

=== Dungeons & Dragons 4th edition ===
The fighter is a core class in 4th edition, and like all other classes uses the new power system where they are classified as having a martial power source. The fighter's role is that of a defender, which involves high hit points, good defensive capabilities and the ability to protect other party members from enemies. Unlike the other core defender, the paladin, the fighter cannot heal allies and has more limited ranged combat capabilities, but has greater damage dealing and mobility control abilities.

Two fighter builds are presented in the Player's Handbook: the Great Weapon Fighter, which focuses on offense, and the Guardian Fighter, which focuses on defense. Martial Power presents two more builds: the Tempest Fighter, which uses two light weapons, and the Battlerager Fighter, which uses axes and hammers and has greatly enhanced resilience in the form of temporary hit points. Fighter attack powers are generally weapon-based and use Strength for attack rolls, although they also have a number of powers which benefit from Dexterity, Wisdom or Constitution. Some fighter attacks have an additional benefit if used with weapons from a specific group, such as axes, spears or light blades.

==== Dungeons & Dragons Essentials ====
The Essentials rulebook Heroes of the Fallen Lands presented two alternate versions of the Fighter, the Knight and the Slayer. The Knight focuses on defense, while the Slayer focuses on both offense and defense.

=== Dungeons & Dragons 5th edition ===
The fighter has been included as a character class in the 5th edition Player's Handbook. Players may choose from one of three Martial Archetypes at third level: Champion, Battle Master, and Eldritch Knight. Each is intended to provide a different flavour to the base fighter class: the Champion archetype focuses on simplistic power, the Battle Master focuses on a unique resource that is used to empower weapon flourishes known as maneuvers, and the Eldritch Knight offers limited access to magic.

Later published sourcebooks have expanded upon the fighter class by granting additional subclass options. Sword Coast Adventurer's Guide (2015) added the Purple Dragon Knight to the Martial Archetype options, which focuses upon assisting and supporting allies. Xanathar's Guide to Everything (2017) added the Arcane Archer, Cavalier, and Samurai as player options. The Arcane Archer uses a unique resource of magically-empowered trick shots; the Cavalier focuses on mounted combat, defending their allies, and marking foes for engagement; and the Samurai focuses on resilience, swift strikes, and social interaction. Explorer's Guide to Wildemount (2020) added the Echo Knight. Tasha's Cauldron of Everything (2020) added two new options: Psi Warrior and Rune Knight.

== Subclasses ==
A number of fighter subclasses have been published intermittently since early in Dungeons & Dragons' history. Subclasses or full classes with names like knight, cavalier, or crusader have appeared in every edition except the original and 4th, although with differing mechanics. An east Asian themed variant, the samurai, appeared as a full class in 3rd edition and as a subclass in 1st and 5th. The 5th edition subclasses arcane archer and psychic warrior also featured in 3rd edition.

== Non-player character ==
Outside of the player base classes, in 3rd edition the Warrior class is a simplified and weakened version of the fighter, intended to be used as a non-player character, as town guard for example.

== Reception ==
Scott Taylor for Black Gate said "Certainly, the groundwork for many a gamer starts with the fighter. He's essentially the 'easy one', the character class you give the new player because all you have to do is swing a weapon and hope the dice are lucky. There are no magic spells to learn, no prayer lists, holy symbols, or thieves tools. It's just put on some armor, grab a sword, and go, and you know, I really love that!"

Screen Rant rated the fighter class as the 2nd most powerful class of the base 12 character classes in the 5th edition.

The Gamer rated the 5th edition fighter subclass Samurai as the 10th most awesome subclass out of the 32 new character options in Xanathar’s Guide to Everything.

Gus Wezerek, for FiveThirtyEight, reported that of the 5th edition "class and race combinations per 100,000 characters that players created on D&D Beyond from" August 15 to September 15, 2017, fighters were the most created at 13,906 total. Human (4,888) was the most common racial combination followed by dwarf (2,009) and then dragonborn (1,335). Wezerek wrote "when I started playing 'Dungeons & Dragons' five years ago, I never would have chosen the game’s most popular match: the human fighter. There are already enough human fighters in movies, TV and books — my first character was an albino dragonborn sorcerer. But these days I can get behind the combo’s simplicity."
