= Cleric (Dungeons & Dragons) =

Standard playable character class in Dungeons & Dragons

- Dungeons & Dragons character class

Editions
- Standard class: Original; Basic; 1st; 2nd; 3rd; v3.5; 4th; 5th; 5.5e

Publication history
- Introduction: Dungeons & Dragons (1974)
- Source books: Men and Magic; Basic Set; Player's Handbook (1978, 1989, 2000, 2003, 2008, 2014, 2024)

Inspiration
- Based on: Cleric

Grouping
- 1E base class: none
- 2E group: Priest
- 4E powersource: Divine
- 4E role: Leader

The cleric is one of the standard playable character class in the Dungeons & Dragons fantasy role-playing game. Clerics are versatile figures, both capable in combat and skilled in the use of divine magic, a form of theurgy or thaumaturgy. Clerics are powerful healers due to the large number of healing and curative magics available to them. With divinely-granted abilities over life or death, they are also able to repel or control undead creatures. Clerics also have specific 'domains' which usually align with the character's alignment and the god that cleric serves. Whether the cleric repels or controls undead is dependent on the cleric's alignment. It is the only class to be included in every edition of Dungeons & Dragons without a name change.

== Publication history ==
=== Dungeons & Dragons ===
The cleric character class first appeared in the original edition of Dungeons & Dragons. In the original edition, the class is described as gaining "some of the advantages from both of the other two classes (Fighting-Men and Magic-Users) in that they have the use of magic armor and all non-edged magic weapons (no arrows!), as well as a number of their own spells. In addition, they are able to use more of the magical items than are the Fighting-Men." As is typical of the terse manner of the original rule books, little more is said about the cleric class. Since then, followers gained when creating a stronghold include "Turcopole"-type horsed crossbowmen, there is already a hint of the crusades as an inspiration, as seemingly later confirmed by Len Lakofka.

The cleric character class began as a simulation of vampire hunting clergy, such as seen in B grade "Hammer Horror" films, specifically created to oppose a vampire player character called "Sir Fang". "The cleric's power to repel the undead had its roots in Dracula, which coined the popular term 'undead' and established a vampire hunter's ability to turn away vampires by the presentation of a crucifix (a holy symbol)".

Gary Gygax added the restriction on weapon types, influenced by a popular interpretation of the Bayeux Tapestry where Odo of Bayeux is depicted with a mace in hand, though this is sometimes conflated with Archbishop Turpin of Chanson de Roland fame, who actually wields both spear and a sword called "Almace". When the paladin character class was introduced in Supplement I – Greyhawk (1975), the potential for confusion between the roles of the two classes arose. The clearest way to understand the distinction is to envision the archetypes as relating primarily to Archbishop Turpin and Roland as models.

=== Advanced Dungeons & Dragons 1st edition ===
The cleric was one of the standard character classes available in the original Player's Handbook. The cleric was presented as one of the five core classes. The cleric's hit dice improved to a d8, clerics could now cast one spell as 1st level characters, and the wisdom score now provided clerics with a spell bonus whereas a low wisdom score imposed a chance of spell failure.

The speciality cleric and cleric spell sphere concepts were first introduced in the Dragonlance Adventures hardcover book (1987).

=== Dungeons & Dragons ===
The cleric was available as a character class in the game's "Basic" edition.

=== Advanced Dungeons & Dragons 2nd edition ===
The cleric, as part of the "priest" group, was one of the standard character classes available in the second edition Player's Handbook. According to the second edition Player's Handbook, the cleric class is similar to certain religious orders of knighthood of the Middle Ages such as the Teutonic Knights, the Knights Templar, and Hospitalers, which combined military and religious training with a code of protection and service. Archbishop Turpin (of The Song of Roland) is an example of such a cleric. The Complete Priest's Handbook details priestly characters and religion in campaigns.

The 2nd edition cleric could optionally choose to be a priest of a specific mythoi and pick a specific religion or mythos. Within the mythos or religion chosen by the character are abilities and powers, represented by the Spheres of Influence (Combat, Creation, Healing, Necromancy, Protection, Sun, Weather, etc.) defined by the worshiped deity's dogma (Tyranny, Death, Life, Healing, etc.), power (demi, lesser, intermediate or greater power), and alignment (Lawful Good, Chaotic Evil, etc.).

Further variant clerics were developed in Spells and Magic and Faith and Avatars, including the Crusader, Monk, Mystic, and Shaman.

==== Spells ====
The cleric's dogma determines what type of spell the cleric has access to, with greater access (all spells within a sphere, providing the cleric is of sufficient power [level] to cast it) for those spells closely aligned with the deity's dogma and minor access (spells of equal to or less than 3rd level) of those partially within the deity's dogma, while no access to those spells outside the deity's dogma.

The deity's power defines the upper limit of the spells able to be granted to a cleric: a demi-god can grant up to 4th level spells and a greater deity up to 7th level spells.

For example, a greater deity of Healing could grant spells of all levels in the Healing sphere, minor access to Divination spells and no access to combat spells such as Flamestrike since they are antithetical to its healing dogma.

==== Weapons and armor ====
Reluctant to shed blood, clerics are limited to blunt, bludgeoning weapons unless allowed other weapons by their dogma or mythos. They are trained for battle and spiritual works, so they may use any armor or shield.

=== Dungeons & Dragons 3rd edition ===
In the 3rd Edition (and revised 3.5 Edition) of D&D, the cleric must choose either a deity or an alignment concept to be dedicated to (the "patron"). The cleric's alignment must be within 1 step of their patron (e.g., for a Lawful Good patron the cleric can be Neutral Good, Lawful Good or Lawful Neutral). Notably, it is also stated that a cleric needn't worship a specific deity or have a religion at all, but can draw their power from a philosophy or even their personal devotion to a cause or way of life.

Divine spellcasting in 3rd Edition is dependent on Wisdom, which restricts the highest spell levels available to the cleric. Other useful abilities for the Cleric include Charisma, to bolster Turn/Rebuke Undead and Diplomacy checks, and Constitution, to complement their melee abilities by way of Concentration for defensive casting, and increased Hit Points.

==== Domains ====
At the beginning of their career, clerics must choose two of the powers associated with the patron (called Domains) as the focus of their particular training, faith, and dogma. These allow them to prepare Domain Spells each day from those domains' spell lists, in addition to their more general cleric spells.

Each domain also has another set power associated with it. For example, the Strength domain allows its clerics to increase their strength for one round per day by a number equal to their cleric level, and the Healing domain makes clerics more adept at casting healing spells. There are many other domains like "animal" or "good".

==== Spontaneous casting ====
Clerics differ from other spellcasters in that they can use an unprepared healing spell (or harming spell, for evil aligned clerics) in lieu of another spell of the same level. For example, Good-aligned clerics can transform a prepared (non-domain) spell into a healing spell of the same level (for example, a Chaotic Good cleric can transform protection from evil, a 1st-level protective spell, into cure light wounds, a 1st-level healing one). Evil aligned clerics can perform a similar feat but convert prepared spells into inflict spells that cause similar damage. Neutral clerics must choose one type of spell conversion or the other at 1st level, which is subsequently permanent.

This choice also affects a cleric's ability to turn (drive off or force to cower in terror) and destroy or rebuke (force to cower in awe) and command undead.

- A cleric who spontaneously casts healing spells channels positive energy, and therefore turns (or destroys) undead.
- A cleric who spontaneously casts inflict spells channels negative energy, and so rebukes (or commands) undead.

Spontaneous casting encourages clerics to function the way adventures often require them to, as steady sources of healing (or damage), but allows them to prepare a full variety of spells in case not all that direct power is needed.

==== Weapons ====
Clerics are no longer restricted to blunt weapons. They are proficient with all simple weapons and may be proficient with other weapons depending upon chosen domains or feats; often clerics will wield their deity's signature weapon (training in this weapon is granted to the cleric by default) as a tangible symbol of their faith and dedication. Clerics may use any armor or shield (except the tower shield, which only fighters normally use).

=== Dungeons & Dragons 4th edition ===
The cleric's power source remains divine, and they fill the role of Leader. Their powers (called prayers) are mainly concerned with healing, protection and support; however, like most 4th edition classes, they gain the standard number of attack powers based on their level, and like all 4th edition classes, their attack powers generally include damage-dealing capabilities. Like Wizards, Clerics gain Ritual Caster as a bonus feat.

The Player's Handbook presents two Cleric builds, Battle Cleric, which focuses on offense, melee combat and Strength-based prayers, and Devoted Cleric, focusing on support, ranged combat and Wisdom-based prayers, many of the cleric's Strength and Wisdom based prayers have secondary effects related to Charisma.

Like paladins, clerics possess the "Channel Divinity" class feature and can use it for multiple functions, including Turn Undead and deity-specific powers.

The Player's Handbook includes four Cleric paragon paths: Angelic Avenger, Divine Oracle, Radiant Servant and Warpriest (later renamed Tactical Warpriest, to avoid confusion with the Essentials variant of the same name).

==== Dungeons & Dragons Essentials ====
The Essentials rulebook Heroes of the Fallen Lands presented an alternate core version of the Cleric, known as the Warpriest.

=== Dungeons & Dragons 5th edition ===
The cleric has been included as a character class in the 5th edition Player's Handbook. Players choose from one of seven Divine Domains when creating a cleric character: Knowledge, Life, Light, Nature, Tempest, Trickery, or War. In addition to those, the Dungeon Master`s Guide contains the Death Domain under the Villainous Class Options section.

Several sourcebooks since the launch of 5th edition have expanded the number of Divine Domain options. Sword Coast Adventurer's Guide (2015) added the Domain of Arcana. Xanathar's Guide to Everything (2017) added the Domains of Forge and Grave. Guildmasters' Guide to Ravnica (2018) added the Domain of Order, which was then reprinted in Tasha's Cauldron of Everything (2020) along with the two new Domains: Peace and Twilight.

Each Divine Domain gives the cleric different default domain spells. The Knowledge domain values learning and understanding, Life values healing, Light values rebirth and renewal, Nature values protecting the natural world, Tempest values the power of the natural world, Trickery values shaking things up and being disruptive (for good or evil) and War values fighting for the deity's faith. The Death domain from the Dungeon Master`s Guide is intended for evil characters and is focused on death, necromancy and the undead. The expanded Domain options list includes: the Arcana domain which melds the power of the gods with magic, the Forge domain that focuses on creation and empowering weapons, the Grave domain that focuses on preserving the balance of life and destroying the undead and the Order domain which represents discipline and devotion to society and law.

Clerics are spellcasters who know their entire spell list, but can only prepare a specific number of them per day equal to their level and Wisdom modifier. They retain the Channel Divinity feature from 4th Edition with different effects depending on their chosen domain.

== Campaign settings ==
=== Dark Sun ===
As there are no gods in Dark Sun, Clerics derive their powers directly from the elemental planes.

== Reception ==
Screen Rant rated the cleric class as the 3rd most powerful class of the base 12 character classes in the 5th edition.

The Gamer rated the 5th edition cleric subclass Grave Domain as the 5th most awesome subclass out of the 32 new character options in Xanathar's Guide to Everything.

Gus Wezerek, for FiveThirtyEight, reported that of the 5th edition "class and race combinations per 100,000 characters that players created on D&D Beyond from" August 15 to September 15, 2017, clerics were the fifth most created at 9,009 total. Human (2,339) was the most common racial combination followed by dwarf (2,199) and then elf (921).

== See also ==
- List of deities in Dungeons & Dragons

== Bibliography ==
- Slavicsek, Bill; Baker, Richard; Mohan, Kim (2005). Dungeons & Dragons for Dummies (Illustrated ed.). For Dummies. ISBN 978-0-7645-8459-6.
