= Rogue (Dungeons & Dragons) =

Character class in the Dungeons & Dragons roleplaying game

- Dungeons & Dragons character class

Editions
- Standard class: Basic, 1st, 2nd, 3rd, v3.5, 4th, 5th
- Alternate class: Original

Publication history
- Previous name: Thief (Original, Basic, 1st, 2nd)
- Introduction: Supplement I - Greyhawk
- Source books: Greyhawk (Original); Basic Set (Basic); Player's Handbook (1st, 2nd, 3rd, 4th, 5th)

Grouping
- 1E base class: none
- 2E group: Rogue
- 4E powersource: Martial
- 4E role: Striker

The rogue, formerly known as the thief, is one of the standard playable character classes in most editions of the Dungeons & Dragons fantasy role-playing game. A rogue is a versatile character, capable of sneaky combat and nimble tricks. The rogue is stealthy and dexterous, and in early editions was the only official base class from the Player's Handbook capable of finding and disarming traps and picking locks. The rogue is also able to use a "sneak attack" ("backstab" in previous editions) against enemies who are caught off-guard or taken by surprise, inflicting extra damage.

== Publication history ==
=== Creative origins ===
The abilities of the thief class were drawn from various archetypes from history and myth, but clear debts from modern fantasy literature can be traced to characters such as J.R.R. Tolkien's Bilbo Baggins, Fritz Leiber's The Gray Mouser, and Jack Vance's Cugel the Clever.

In his article "Jack Vance and the D&D Game", Gary Gygax stresses the influence that Vance's Cugel and also Zelazny's Shadowjack had on the thief class.

=== Dungeons & Dragons ===
D&D fan Gary Switzer shared the idea for a thief class with Gary Gygax over the phone; development was done in Switzer's roleplaying group, primarily by D. Daniel Wagner, one of the writers of The Manual of Aurania, the first non-TSR D&D supplement. The thief was first published in the Game Players Newsletter #9 (June 1974). The thief class was then included in the original 1975 Greyhawk supplement. They had 4-sided hit dice under the new combat system introduced in that supplement.

=== Advanced Dungeons & Dragons 1st edition ===
The thief was one of the standard character classes available in the original Player's Handbook. The thief was presented as one of the five core classes in the original Players Handbook. In 1st edition the thief was the only character class that any nonhuman type, such as an elf, dwarf, or halfling, could achieve unlimited levels in. The thief's hit dice improved to a d6. In 1st edition, thieves were swiftest to earn new levels. At the same time, thieves were sharply limited by having their essential skills (such as Open Locks and Move Silently) defined as beginning at a flat chance of success of perhaps 10-20% regardless of most circumstances, and requiring perhaps ten levels to reach the point where they had much confidence in using them.

=== Basic Dungeons & Dragons ===
Thieves were available as a character class in the game's "Basic" edition. In the later (Moldvay and Mentzer) editions of the Basic Set, they could be any of the three available alignment options (Lawful, Neutral and Chaotic). Thieves had to be Human, as this edition treated non-human races as distinct classes. They retained the same abilities (with the same high failure rates at low levels) as in the Original and Advanced games, and at higher levels gained additional abilities, such as the ability to read any nonmagical writing (including dead languages and secret codes) and casting magic-user spells from scrolls, both with a high success rate.

=== Advanced Dungeons & Dragons 2nd edition ===
The thief, as part of the "rogue" group, was one of the standard character classes available in the second edition Player's Handbook. According to the second edition Player's Handbook, many famous folk heroes have been larcenous like the thief class, including Reynard the Fox, Robin Goodfellow, and Ali Baba.

In 2nd edition the term "Rogue" first appeared, used to describe the group of classes made up of those individuals "living by their wits day to day-often at the expense of others." In the core rules, these "rogue" classes were the thief and the bard. Thieves could be of any alignment other than lawful good while bards had to be at least partially neutral.

The thief was the robber, the thug, or the "expert treasure hunter". They specialized in the acquisition of goods, stealth, and disarming traps. Unlike in 1st edition, 2nd edition allows thieves to specialize in skills so that they needed only a few levels to master two skills.

The assassin class, a sub-class of the thief in first edition, was excluded from the second edition core rules. The assumption was that an assassin could be treated mechanically as a normal thief who simply specialized in assassination-related skills.

The thief class is further detailed in The Complete Thief's Handbook.

=== Dungeons & Dragons 3rd edition ===
The thief became known as the rogue in 3rd edition. Spies, scouts, detectives, pirates, and sundry ne'er-do-wells, as well as thieves and just about any other character who relies on stealth or a broad range of skills, are stated to fall under the rogue class. In fact, the character class still bears only three large divergences from other character classes, namely their superior aptitude for skills, their capacity to notice traps, and their signature "sneak attack" maneuver.

The rogue class is given 8 skill points per level, higher than any other character class. However, the number of skill points is modified by the Intelligence attribute, so it is possible for a very low intellect rogue to be no better off than a particularly bright fighter, although they would still have a broader range of skills to choose from. Also, 3rd edition skills removed the flat percentage rolls that previous thieves had used, using their Difficulty Class mechanic to let a rogue have a better chance against the cheap locks and ordinary guards that might appear in lower-level games.

Modifying the skills system, rogues are normally the only class allowed to search for most traps; nobody else has the training to recognize them. However supplements to core D&D have added a few new classes that can also recognize traps, such as the scout.

The rogue has the ability to deliver a sneak attack whenever an opponent loses its Dexterity bonus to Armor Class (i.e., when the opponent is flat-footed or flanked or cannot see the rogue). The rogue can then take advantage of this momentary weakness to strike at a vital part of the anatomy (provided the creature has a discernible enough anatomy to suffer a critical hit). This ability was formerly a "backstab," which made it difficult to define when it might be applied in open combat. Allowing flanking (attacking while a teammate is on the opposite side of the target to create a sneak attack) makes the rogue deal a great amount of damage.

The assassin was reintroduced in 3rd edition as a prestige class option.

The Iconic rogue is Lidda, a halfling female.

=== Dungeons & Dragons 4th edition ===
Fourth edition Rogues are skirmishers, focused on getting to where the enemy does not want them and hurting them by applying extra "sneak attack" damage to enemies that grant combat advantage to them (for instance because they are flanking the enemy or the enemy is dazed or prone). They are also highly skilled, with the most trained skills of any class in the game and all with training in stealth and thievery (a skill that includes picking locks and pockets, and disarming traps). In fourth edition rules, there are two very different mechanical conceptions of the same class; Rogues and Thieves.

The Rogue was introduced in the fourth edition Player's Handbook, and initially came in two types; Artful Dodgers and Brutal Scoundrels, with Artful Dodgers being able to slip past or flank enemies easily (gaining their charisma bonus to defend against opportunity attacks) and Brutal Scoundrels adding their strength bonus to sneak attack damage to hit even further. Player's Handbook Rogues focus on their Exploits – codified tricks they can use either at will, once per encounter, or once per day and that show how they move and how they attack. Martial Power added the Ruthless Ruffian who can use maces easily and focuses on intimidating people as well as hurting them, and Martial Power 2 added the Cunning Sneak who can hide in shadows where no one else can and therefore normally specialises in ranged attacks, and added in the option to choose as their weapon talent the crossbow.

The Thief was added in Heroes of the Fallen Lands and uses a very different approach to roguish skirmishing; instead of representing the Rogue's more cinematic abilities with encounter and daily exploits it does so with "tricks" that the rogue uses as they move, with, for example, Tactical Trick allowing them combat advantage against any enemy adjacent to one of your allies and Sneak's Trick allowing the thief to hide as easily as a Cunning Sneak rogue can in order to more easily ambush enemies. The assassin was introduced as an exclusive class in D&D Insider.

=== Dungeons & Dragons 5th edition ===
The rogue is included as one of the standard character classes in the 5th edition Player's Handbook. The Rogue's focal point in 5th edition is its aptitude for skill checks. It gains proficiency in more skills than any other class, and three of the features it gains through levels serve to improve the skills' respective ability checks. Its core features include sneak attack, which rewards a player for gaining advantage on an attack roll, such as by sneaking up on a foe unseen or incapacitating it.

Players may choose from three different Roguish Archetypes at third level: Thief, Assassin, and Arcane Trickster. The Thief archetype focuses on rogues who steal, giving bonuses for sleight of hand, climbing and sneaking. The Assassin archetype deals with rogues who kill for a living, allowing them to dispatch targets swiftly and create poisons and false identities. The Arcane Trickster archetype opens up limited magic to rogues allowing them to cast spells. Several sourcebooks since the launch of 5th edition have expanded the number of Roguish Archetypes options. Sword Coast Adventurer's Guide (2015) added Mastermind and Swashbuckler to the list of Rogue archetypes. The Mastermind becomes an expert in leadership and deception, while the Swashbuckler focuses upon swordplay and rakish taunting. Xanathar's Guide to Everything (2017) reprinted both these earlier subclasses and added the Inquisitive, which focuses on detective work and investigation, and the Scout, which focuses on swiftness and a few survival skills. Tasha's Cauldron of Everything (2020) added two more Archetypes: Phantom and Soulknife.

== Subclasses ==
Assassin
- Dungeons & Dragons character class

Editions
- Alternate class: Original, 4th
- Subclass: 1st, 5th, 5.5e
- Prestige class: 3rd, v3.5

Publication history
- Introduction: Supplement II - Blackmoor
- Source books: Blackmoor; Dragon Magazine #379; Dungeon Master's Guide (2000, 2003); Player's Handbook (1978, 2014, 2024)

Grouping
- 1E base class: Thief
- 4E powersource: Shadow
- 4E role: Striker
- 5E base class: Rogue

A number of rogue subclasses have been published intermittently since early in Dungeons & Dragons' history. Assassin appeared as a full class in the original edition's Supplement II: Blackmoor and in a 4th edition issue of Dragon Magazine, and it was a subclass or prestige class in 1st, 3rd, and 5th editions. Ninja was a subclass in 1st edition and a full class in 2nd and 3rd. Arcane trickster, scout, soulknife, and swashbuckler all appeared in 3rd edition supplements as full classes or prestige classes and were reintroduced as rogue subclasses in 5th edition.

== Reception ==
Screen Rant rated the rogue class as the 6th most powerful class of the base 12 character classes in the 5th edition.

The Gamer rated the 5th edition rogue subclass Swashbuckler as the 3rd most awesome subclass out of the 32 new character options in Xanathar’s Guide to Everything.

Gus Wezerek, for FiveThirtyEight, reported that of the 5th edition "class and race combinations per 100,000 characters that players created on D&D Beyond from" August 15 to September 15, 2017, rogues were second most created at 11,307 total. Human (2,542) was the most common racial combination followed by elf (2,257) and then halfling (1,797).

== Bibliography ==
Cook, Monte; Tweet, Jonathan & Williams, Skip. Player's Handbook. 2000, Wizards of the Coast.
