= Paladin (Dungeons & Dragons) =

Character class in Dungeons & Dragons

- Dungeons & Dragons character class

Editions
- Standard class: 2nd; 3rd; v3.5; 4th; 5th; 5.5e
- Alt. class: Original
- Subclass: 1st
- Prestige class: Basic

Publication history
- Introduction: Supplement I – Greyhawk
- Source books: Greyhawk; Companion Set; Player's Handbook (1978, 1989, 2000, 2003, 2008, 2014, 2024)

Grouping
- 1E base class: Fighter or Cavalier
- 2E group: Warrior
- 4E powersource: Divine
- 4E role: Defender

The paladin is one of the standard playable character classes in most editions of the Dungeons & Dragons fantasy role-playing game. The paladin is a holy knight, crusading in the name of good and order, and is a divine spellcaster.

From 1st through 3rd edition, paladins were required to maintain the Lawful Good alignment. In addition, compared with other classes, the paladin class has one of the most restrictive codes of conduct; further, paladin characters are expected to demonstrate and embody goodness. Failure to maintain a lawful good alignment or adhere to the code of conduct causes paladins to lose their paladin status and many of their special abilities until they are able to atone. With the introduction of the 4th edition of D&D, paladins become champions of a chosen deity instead of just righteous warriors, paladins can be of any alignment and can no longer fall in disgrace and lose their paladinhood.

== Publication history ==
=== Creative origins ===
The development of the Dungeons & Dragons Paladin, first introduced in the original Greyhawk supplement, was heavily influenced by the fictional character Holger Carlson from Poul Anderson's novel Three Hearts and Three Lions, which was in turn based on the epic poetry of the chansons de geste. Gary Gygax himself stated the class was actually drawn from the paladins of Charlemagne, Arthurian legend, and the historical code of chivalry.

=== Dungeons & Dragons ===
The paladin was first introduced in Supplement I – Greyhawk (1975), as a subclass of fighting man.

=== Advanced Dungeons & Dragons 1st edition ===
The paladin was one of the standard character classes available in the original Player's Handbook. The paladin was one of five subclasses presented in the original Player's Handbook. In the 1st edition of Dungeons & Dragons the paladin class had very high ability score prerequisites, and stipulated that only human characters could be paladins. Despite this, several Dragon magazine articles describe paladins of other races besides human and of other cultures besides the Western European chivalric romance notion of a true Christian knight.

The paladin was a sub-class in the Player's Handbook, and while a paladin was now much more powerful, paladins must satisfy more rigorous criteria. When Unearthed Arcana was first published in 1985, the paladin class became a sub-class of the newly introduced cavalier class.

=== Advanced Dungeons & Dragons 2nd edition ===
The paladin, as part of the "warrior" group, was one of the standard character classes available in the second edition Player's Handbook. The second edition Player's Handbook gives several examples of heroes throughout legend and history who could be called paladins: Roland and the 12 Peers of Charlemagne, Sir Lancelot, Sir Gawain, and Sir Galahad.

The paladin, like all other classes, eventually received its own specific handbook, The Complete Paladin's Handbook, published in 1994.

As in 1st edition, the paladin class had very high ability score prerequisites, and stipulated that only human characters could be paladins.

=== Dungeons & Dragons 3rd edition ===
The paladin is one of the standard character classes available in the third edition of the Player's Handbook.

While there are no specific ability score requirements, a paladin character in 3rd edition is still advised to have some high scores in order to be effective. These abilities are:

- Strength and Constitution: As their class makeup and general code of conduct favors front-rank combat, Strength and Constitution are both important to Paladins in order to deal and withstand damage in melee.
- Charisma: Charisma is key to the Paladin's most crucial abilities: Lay on Hands (for healing) and Smite Evil (to harm malign creatures); both function relative to Charisma bonus, as does Divine Grace, which grants improved saving throws (commonly used to resist harmful magic). Turn Undead is also bolstered by Charisma.
- Wisdom: Though generally less critical than Charisma, a good Wisdom score is necessary in order for a Paladin to access divine spells at higher levels.

Other Paladin class abilities include the ability to detect evil at will, immunity to fear and disease, the ability to cure disease, the opportunity to use "holy avenger" swords with imbued divine spells or extra damage to evil creatures, and to summon a "special mount" – usually a heavy warhorse of unusual strength and intelligence. Their spell-casting and Turn Undead abilities are similar to but weaker or more specialized than comparable cleric abilities.

Edition 3.0

A Paladin in Edition 3.0 has a specified Code of Conduct section as follows:
- A Paladin must be of Lawful Good alignment.
- A Paladin will lose all special class abilities if they ever willingly commit an evil act.
- A Paladin must act with honor (not lying, cheating, not using poison, etc.).
- A Paladin must help those who need help, provided they do not use the help for evil or chaotic ends.
- A Paladin is required to punish those that harm or threaten innocents.
- A Paladin will never knowingly associate with evil character
A Paladin in Edition 3.0 also has a specified Association section as follows:
- A Paladin will not continue an association with someone who consistently offends their moral code.
- A Paladin may only hire henchmen and accept followers who are Lawful Good.

Edition 3.5

As of 3.5 the explicit Code of Conduct and Association sections have been removed. A Paladin in Edition 3.5 no longer has a defined Code of Conduct section. However, a reference to a loosely defined Code of Conduct was added to the class Alignment section as a qualifier:
- Additionally, paladins swear to follow a code of conduct that is in line with lawfulness and goodness.

Unlike earlier releases, in 3rd edition, when designing your character, the Paladin Code of Conduct offers steadily greater flexibility. There is no longer a single, specific, "Code of Conduct that governs all Paladins". This seems likely, due to a tandem decoupling of the Paladin with a specific deity requirement complete with a switch to a concept of internal righteousness as per the Religion section Player's Handbook - Paladin Class:

- A paladin need not devote herself to a single deity, deity, devotion to righteousness is enough.

A paladin who ceases to be lawful good, who willfully commits an evil act, or who grossly violates the code of conduct loses all special abilities and spells. They also may not progress in levels as a paladin. They regain their abilities if they atone for their violations.

The paladin class is available to all races, although most paladins are still human. The class is notably uncommon among savage humanoids such as orcs and goblins, where good-aligned beings are rare.

Similarly to monks, paladins cannot consistently multiclass. Adding levels to any other class permanently halts progression as a paladin, to reflect the devotion and single-mindedness of purpose expected of the class. However, all class abilities are retained in such cases.

Exceptions to Multiclass Restrictions:

Certain feats found in the source material permit unrestricted multiclassing with Paladin:
- The Complete Adventurer offers a general feat called Divine Inquisitor for the Paladin Rogue multiclass option, coupling the Paladin's Sneak Attack with their Smite Evil attack to Daze their opponent, additionally it allows unrestricted multiclassing between the two classes.
- The Eberron campaign setting permit normal multiclassing (e.g. Eberron's Knight Training feat permits multiclassing with any one chosen class, and permits the same benefit to monk levels if that is the class chosen).
Some prestige classes also waive this restriction (typically classes built especially for paladins). A fallen paladin can choose to trade in their levels for equivalent Blackguard powers.

Certain accessory products, most notably the Unearthed Arcana, feature variant Paladins such as the Lawful Evil Paladin of Tyranny, the Chaotic Evil Paladin of Slaughter, and the Chaotic Good Paladin of Freedom (with the base paladin being called "Paladin of Honor"). Under this scheme, paladins become complementary to druids, championing the extreme "corner" alignments just as druids are champions of the partly Neutral "cross" alignments. However, issue 310 of Dragon magazine featured a "paladin" for each alignment (for example, a Neutral Good Sentinel).

Aasimar have paladin as their favored class.

=== Dungeons & Dragons 4th edition ===
With the installment of Dungeons & Dragons 4th Edition, paladins are now champions of a chosen deity rather than just being a righteous warrior. As such, paladins may also have a different alignment from the traditional lawful good, but the paladin's alignment must correspond with their chosen god. Another new feature is the permanence of paladinhood. Once a character is ordained as a paladin, they cannot fall or have powers stripped in any way. This can allow players to avoid having to "police" their fellow party members, but depending on one's god, it may be encouraged to curb any excessively evil behavior. It is stated that failing to live up to one's deity's tenets will result in that paladin's compatriots hunting down and judging their wayward members.

Smite Evil has also been replaced with various "smites" and "strikes" as part of the paladin's power set, which are defined as Prayers (the term used for divine classes' powers). Two builds are presented in the Player's Handbook: the Avenging Paladin, based on Strength and offense, and the Protecting Paladin, based on Charisma and defense. Strength-based attack prayers are generally weapon-based and limited to melee range, while Charisma-based attack prayers include both melee weapon attacks and ranged implement-based attacks. Paladins also have the divine challenge class feature, which causes a targeted opponent to take damage when it makes an attack which does not include the paladin, as well as "marking" that opponent, which penalizes any attack roll the opponent makes against a target other than the marking character. In place of a bonded mount, they can have powers at later levels that allow them to teleport across the battle field to aid endangered allies. The paladin was initially the only class in 4th edition to have plate armor proficiency at first level. Since then, the Knight (a variant of the fighter, first presented in Heroes of the Fallen Lands) and two more paladin variants, the Cavalier (Heroes of the Forgotten Kingdoms) and the Blackguard (Heroes of Shadow), also have this ability. Paladins may also take special feats related to their deity with their Channel Divinity class feature.

Many paladin prayers benefit from high Wisdom, and like clerics, paladins can use holy symbols as implements. Paladins no longer have the innate ability to remove disease or have immunity to diseases or fear, but can gain powers that allow other characters to make saving throws for status ailments that can be ended as such, as well as bolster resistances to negative status effects. Paladins also have the highest amount of healing surges out of any class, which when combined with their lay on hands ability, allows them to act as emergency healers. In 4th edition, paladins use the standard multiclassing rules instead of having special multiclassing restrictions like they did in the previous edition.

=== Dungeons & Dragons 5th edition ===
The paladin has been included as a character class in the 5th edition Player's Handbook. In 5th edition, paladins commit themselves to a path that obeys a certain set of tenets, and can choose one of a number of sacred oaths that encompasses the nature of their quest:

- Oath of the Ancients: paladins who cast their lot in with the side of the light in the cosmic struggle against darkness because they love the beautiful and life-giving things of the world, not necessarily because they believe in principles of honor, courage, and justice. Those who take this oath are typically Neutral Good, putting the principles of good above concerns of law or chaos, and follow the tenets of Kindling the Light, Sheltering the Light, Preserving Their Own Light, and Being the Light. Nicknamed fey knights, green knights, or horned knights.
- Oath of Devotion: paladins who appeal to the loftiest ideals of justice, virtue, and honor. Those who take this oath are typically Lawful Good, following the tenets of honesty, courage, compassion, honor, and duty. Nicknamed cavaliers, white knights, or holy warriors.
- Oath of Vengeance: a solemn commitment to punishing those who have committed grievous sins. Those who take this oath are typically either Lawful Neutral or Neutral due to their willingness to forsake their own righteousness to mete out justice upon those who do evil. Their tenets are simple: Fight the Greater Evil, No Mercy for the Wicked, By Any Means Necessary, and Restitution. Nicknamed avengers or dark knights.

Several sourcebooks since the launch of 5th edition have expanded the number of oath options:

- Oath of the Crown: Paladins who follow this path are sworn to the ideals of civilization, serving society and the just laws that hold the society together. Their tenets are usually set by the sovereign they serve but generally include: Law, Loyalty, Courage and Responsibility. This oath is found in Sword Coast Adventurer's Guide (2015).
- Oath of Conquest: These paladins are those who seek glory in battle and subjection of their enemies, since to these paladins (known as iron mongers or knight tyrants) it isn't enough to just establish order; they must also vigorously crush the forces of chaos and evil. These Paladins toe the line between hero and villain in their neverending quest to squash evil evident by the fact that even archdevils such as Bel have paladins as some of their more ardent supporters. With their tenets being Douse the Flames of Hope, Rule with an Iron Fist and Strength of Above All. This oath is found in Xanathar's Guide to Everything (2017).
- Oath of Redemption: Paladins who dedicate themselves to this oath believe that any person can be redeemed and that the path of benevolence and justice is one that anyone can walk. These paladins face evil creatures in the hope of turning their foes to the light, and they slay their enemies only when such a deed will clearly save other lives. Their tenets are Peace, Innocence, Patience and Wisdom. This oath is found in Xanathar's Guide to Everything (2017).
- Oath of Glory: Originally introduced in Mythic Odysseys of Theros (2020), it was then reprinted in Tasha's Cauldron of Everything (2020).
- Oath of the Watchers: Introduced in Tasha's Cauldron of Everything (2020).

Paladins can be any of alignment, although evil paladins are extremely rare. However, their oath and their alignment can either be in harmony, or their oath might represent standards that they have not yet attained. The 5th edition Dungeon Master's Guide also includes an entry for Oathbreaker paladins, including class features and a quick guideline for atonement.

== The Anti-Paladin ==
An article in the July 1980 issue 39 of Dragon magazine introduced a new non-player character to Dungeons & Dragons, the evil opposite of the Paladin, the Anti-Paladin. The article stated, "The Anti-Paladin represents everything that is mean, low and despicable in the human race."

Introduced first in the original Fiend Folio, the Death Knight is an undead warrior who only desires "vengeance, conquest, and other bloody evils"; tempted to have "power unmitigated by age", the ritual to become a Death Knight pulls and binds "the ritual caster's soul" into "the weapon used in the ritual". Shannon Appelcline considered this creature created by Charles Stross one of the game's especially notable monsters. Appelcline also noted that it "would become a crucial feature in settings such as Dragonlance and Ravenloft". In 2007, Dungeons & Dragons designer Matthew Sernett noted that Stross designed the creature to be "an armor-wearing lich" with the ability to wield both a sword and spellcasting; initially, the Death Knight "changed little from its original form" during edition changes. However, 3rd Edition "gave the lich some space by removing nearly all the death knight's spells" and the 4th Edition iteration reinforced the idea of the creature "as a significant melee threat". The 2014 Monster Manual for the 5th Edition describes the Death Knight as an undead paladin that has fallen from grace and has died before seeking atonement.

== Campaign settings ==
=== Dark Sun ===
Paladins do not exist in Athas.

=== Eberron ===
In the Eberron campaign setting, the most famous paladins belong to the religion of the Silver Flame and are known for their monotheistic worship and their crusades against lycanthropes and demons. The Silver Flame religion venerates the paladin Tira Miron, who sacrificed herself to defeat a powerful demon.

=== Forgotten Realms ===
All paladins in the Forgotten Realms are devoted to patron deities of either Law or Good and often permitted to obtain special training based on the divine portfolio of their patron deity. Lord Piergieron, leader of the Lords of Waterdeep (the most prominent city in the Forgotten Realms), is a paladin.

== In video games ==
The paladin's specialties in most Dungeons & Dragons video games are its high defense, its ability to cast spells and especially its proficiency against undead monsters. Dungeons & Dragons video games such as Neverwinter Nights often loosen the requirements for playing a paladin to simply being lawful good in alignment, and the paladin's unique position and alignment restriction is very rarely apparent in these games (with the exception of The Temple of Elemental Evil) where the paladin can search dead bodies and unprotected chests and lockers without moral penalties. For example, in the game Icewind Dale II paladins will often refuse the rewards for quests if they represent the party to the quest giver, since "[the] paladins of Icewind Dale do not accept monetary gain for their just deeds."

== Reception ==
In the book The Evolution of Fantasy Role-Playing Games (2014), Michael Tresca highlighted that from beginning of the game "fighters of lawful alignment could become paladins from the outset and had a charisma score score of at least 17, positioning paladins as exemplary leaders. Their lawful allegiance was much stricter than other classes [...]. Where the cleric was more a healer and less a combatant, the paladin was more combatant and less healer."

J.K. Miles and Karington Hess, in an essay in Dungeons & Dragons and Philosophy (2014), discussed character alignment, good characters, and what makes a character good to play. They argued that facing ethical dilemmas enhances play, writing that "getting to level 20 is not nearly as interesting as the naive but zealous paladin who swears death to all orcs, but who is forced to decide whether to slay innocent orc children who will likely grow up to plague the countryside". They opined that "without the moral constraints, paladins are just self-righteous clerics with a better attack bonus and some nifty super-natural abilities", noting that paladins are judged as good or evil based on "repeated actions". Matthew Jones and Ashley Brown, in a separate essay, commented that Dungeons & Dragons uses an "idealized concept of medieval fantasy", with "the paladin explicitly harking back to the notion of the chivalrous and divinely inspired crusading knight". They highlighted that the use of "willfully commits an evil act" in the paladin class description as "significant" since "it allows for an act performed with good intentions to lead to evil consequences without itself being an evil act". They wrote "the plight of the paladin is illustrative of an important conflict in ethical theory: the conflict between deontological, duty-based and utilitarian, outcome-based ethical theories".

Gus Wezerek, for FiveThirtyEight, reported that of the 5th edition "class and race combinations per 100,000 characters that players created on D&D Beyond from" August 15 to September 15, 2017, paladins were 7th in player creations at 8,840 total. Human (2,326) was the most common racial combination followed by dragonborn (1,688) and then dwarf (971). Wezerek wrote "when I started playing 'Dungeons & Dragons' five years ago, I never would have chosen the game's most popular match: the human fighter. There are already enough human fighters in movies, TV and books – my first character was an albino dragonborn sorcerer. But these days I can get behind the combo's simplicity." Screen Rant rated the paladin class as the 4th most powerful class of the base 12 character classes in the 5th edition. The Gamer rated the 5th edition paladin subclass Oath of Conquest as the 4th most awesome subclass out of the 32 new character options in Xanathar's Guide to Everything.

== Bibliography ==
- Cook, David (1989). Player's Handbook. TSR. ISBN 0-88038-716-5.
- Gygax, Gary (1978). Players Handbook. TSR. ISBN 0-935696-01-6.
- Redman, Rich; Wyatt, James (2001). Defenders of The Faith – A Guidebook to Clerics and Paladins. Wizards of the Coast. ISBN 0-7869-1840-3.
- Scott, Amber E (September 2002). "Blessings of War". Dragon #299. XXVII (4). Paizo: 74–77. ISSN 1062-2101.
- Swan, Rick (1994). The Complete Paladin's Handbook. TSR. ISBN 1-56076-845-2.
- Tweet, Jonathan; Cook, Monte; Williams, Skip (2000). Player's Handbook. Wizards of the Coast. ISBN 0-7869-1550-1.
- Tweet, Jonathan; Cook, Monte; Williams, Skip (2003). Player's Handbook v.3.5. revised by Andy Collins. Wizards of the Coast. ISBN 0-7869-2886-7.
- Wyatt, James (5 April 2001). "Defenders of the Faith: Called to Serve". Wizards of the Coast. Archived from the original (Web Enhancement) on 10 November 2014.
