= Monk (Dungeons & Dragons) =

Dungeons & Dragons character class

- Dungeons & Dragons character class

Editions
- Standard class: 1st; 3rd; v3.5; 5th; 5.5e
- Alternate class: Original; Basic; 2nd; 4th

Publication history
- First appearance: Supplement II – Blackmoor
- Source books: Blackmoor; Master Set; Player's Handbook (1978, 2000, 2003, 2014, 2024); Faiths & Avatars; Player's Handbook 3
- Previous name: Mystic (basic edition)

Grouping
- 1E base class: none
- 2E group: Priest
- 4E powersource: Psionic
- 4E role: Striker

The monk (also mystic) is a playable character class in most editions of the Dungeons & Dragons fantasy role-playing game. A D&D monk is a fantasy martial artist, specializing in unarmed combat.

== Publication history ==
=== Original Dungeons & Dragons ===
The monk as a character class was introduced in 1975's Blackmoor supplement. Shannon Appelcline, author of the Designers & Dragons series, wrote that "Brian Blume is believed to have contributed to Blackmoor, primarily due to one statement by Gary Gygax. In his forward to Oriental Adventures (1985), written ten years after the production of Blackmoor, Gygax claimed that the monk character class was 'inspired by Brian Blume and the book series called The Destroyer'. Tim Kask offers a more nuanced origin, saying that the monk definitely originated with Dave Arneson, but Brian Blume heard of it and may have adapted it on his own. Kask 'could not tell you how much of what [he] was given for the editing of [Blackmoor] about the Monk PC was Dave's or Brian's'."

=== Advanced Dungeons & Dragons 1st edition ===
The monk was a main character class in the first edition Players Handbook. The monk was presented as one of the five core classes in the original Players Handbook.

In 1981, Philip Meyers argued that "the monk is the weakest of the character classes" in an article published in Dragon Magazine #53 (later reprinted in Best of Dragon, Volume III). Meyers offered an extensive unofficial revision to the class, expanding and strengthening many of its game abilities (for example, increasing the monk's hit dice by 50%, raising the maximum level from 17 to 21, and adding class abilities as a "form of psionic power").

In 1985, the next official revision of the monk appeared as a character class in the first edition Oriental Adventures rulebook, by Gary Gygax and David Cook. This version retained most of the class as presented in the first edition Players Handbook, but replaced the abstract hand-to-hand attacks with a more specific rules system to emulate different styles of martial arts (such as karate, judo, etc.). According to a reviewer for White Dwarf, this version of the monk was "altered to fit into an Eastern pattern", and was "at last in the proper context".

=== Basic Dungeons & Dragons ===
The monk was available as a character class known as a "mystic" in the game's "Basic" edition, introduced in the Dungeons & Dragons Master Set.

=== Advanced Dungeons & Dragons 2nd edition ===
The monk was dropped as one of the standard character classes available in the second edition. The Complete Priest's Handbook did, however, allow for clerics to take on some aspects of the monk class via the monk kit. This version of the monk retained clerical spellcasting and gained unarmed combat skills.

The monk was reintroduced as a second edition class of the priest group in Faiths & Avatars and Player's Option: Spells & Magic. This version of the monk is a fully playable character class, but differs significantly from previous incarnations of the monk. This version of the monk gains priestly spells (though from different spheres of influence than the cleric) and retains skill with unarmed attacks and unarmored defenses, but no other abilities attributed to earlier versions of the monk.

With the release of The Complete Psionics Handbook, many of the psionic or psionic-like abilities of the 1st edition monk became available in 2nd edition, though the 2nd edition monk was not given these abilities.

The monk was also reintroduced in The Scarlet Brotherhood for the Greyhawk setting, along with the Assassin class. This version is a direct update of the first edition class, and has no clerical powers.

=== Dungeons & Dragons 3rd edition ===
With the release of the third edition rules, the monk was reintroduced as a class. Among the "iconic characters" developed for the 3rd edition to illustrate the different classes within the artwork of the rulebooks, quarterstaff-wielding Ember represented the monk.

=== Dungeons & Dragons 4th edition ===
A preview version of the class was published online in the 375th issue of Dragon, released in May 2009.

As published in Player's Handbook III, the Monk uses the Psionic power source, but may use ki focuses (similar in use to implements used by spellcasting classes) to add enhancements to his unarmed attacks. The monk class now makes it possible for them to use weapons effectively, even allowing them to be used as implements for some powers. In the absence of proficiency with high-damage weapons, however, the monk is still primarily an unarmed class.

=== Dungeons & Dragons 5th edition ===
The monk has been included as a character class in the 5th edition Player's Handbook. It features three Monastic Traditions a Monk can choose from: the Way of the Open Hand, the Way of Shadow and the Way of the Four Elements. Several sourcebooks since the launch of 5th edition have expanded the number of Monastic Traditions. Sword Coast Adventurer's Guide (2015) introduced two new traditions: the Way of the Long Death and the Way of the Sun Soul. Xanathar's Guide to Everything (2017) reprinted the Way of the Sun Soul and introduced two more traditions: The Way of the Drunken Master and the Way of the Kensei. Tasha's Cauldron of Everything (2020) introduced two more traditions: Way of Mercy and Way of Astral Self.

The Way of the Open Hand are the master of martial arts, allowing monks to manipulate ki in combat. Way of the Shadow monks are sneaky and stealthy, allowing monks to use ki to hide themselves. Way of the Four Elements monks are masters of harnessing the elements through ki. The expanded Monastic Tradition options list includes: the Way of the Long Death, allowing monks to use ki to manipulate life and death itself, the Way of the Sun Soul, which allows monks to channel their life energy into attacks, the Way of the Drunken Master, improving mobility, luck and speed in the heat of battle with the unpredictability of the drunkard, and the Way of the Kensei, which grants monks mastery over ki-empowered weapon usage.

== Reception ==
In the book The Evolution of Fantasy Role-Playing Games (2014), Michael Tresca wrote that while the original monk was a cleric path, the monk (as standardized in Oriental Adventures) "is one of the few classes that have no anchor in Western lore. Crusading knights encountered the assassins, but the monk is a particularly Eastern phenomenon. As a result, the monk's roots were sometimes conflated, such that one set of lead miniatures had Franciscan-style monks posed in martial arts stances." Tresca also highlighted that the monk "was inspired by the fictional martial art Sinanju [...] [which] bestowed abilities upon its practitioners that bordered on the fantastic, including the ability to climb walls, dodge bullets, outrun a car, and the like".

Screen Rant rated the monk class as the 2nd to least powerful class of the base 12 character classes in the 5th edition.

The Gamer rated the 5th edition monk subclass Way Of The Sun Soul as the most awesome subclass out of the 32 new character options in Xanathar’s Guide to Everything.

Gus Wezerek, for FiveThirtyEight, reported that of the 5th edition "class and race combinations per 100,000 characters that players created on D&D Beyond from" August 15 to September 15, 2017, monks were 9th in player creations at 7,892 total. Human (1,946) was the most common racial combination followed by elf (1,349) and then aarakocra (835).
