= Sword Coast Adventurer's Guide =

Tabletop role-playing game supplement

- Rules required: Dungeons & Dragons, 5th edition
- Campaign setting: Forgotten Realms
- First published: 3 November 2015
- Pages: 159
- ISBN: 978-0786965809

Sword Coast Adventurer's Guide is a supplement to the 5th edition of the Dungeons & Dragons role-playing game.

== Publication history ==
Sword Coast Adventurer's Guide was written by Joseph Carriker, Brian Cortijo, and Jeremy Crawford, and was published by Wizards of the Coast with Green Ronin Publishing in 2015. On book's development process, Steve Kenson, Lead Designer of Sword Coast Adventurer’s Guide, said "we had to balance rooting those options strongly in the Realms – and the Sword Coast, in particular – while also making them as broadly useful to D&D players as possible. Too much one way and you lose the unique character and style of the Realms that make it such an appealing setting; too much the other and the Adventurer’s Guide would only be useful to those looking to adventure in the Realms".

== Reception ==
In Publishers Weekly's "Best-selling Books Week Ending November 16, 2015", Sword Coast Adventurer's Guide was #18 in "Hardcover Nonfiction". The book was a Judges’ Spotlight Winner at the 2016 ENnies Awards.

Jonathan Bolding, for The Escapist, highlighted that the book fails to meet its $40 MSRP — "Sword Coast Adventurer's Guide, taken as a whole, is not a very good roleplaying game book. It's a 20-page whirlwind tour of thirty-some years of Forgotten Realms history and geography, a kinda-useful 40-page whirlwind tour of the Sword Coast region. The rest of the book is 60 pages of mostly-superfluous descriptions of what standard D&D characters are like in the realms, with scattered nuggets of game mechanics customizing specific classes, a few alternate racial mechanics, and a trove of backgrounds. None of these sections particularly excels".

Alex Lucard, for DieHard GameFan, also highlighted the cost of the book and wrote "what you’re getting here is extremely overpriced for the page count. [...] The book basically assumes you are a long time D&D veteran and expects your memories and previous Forgotten Realms releases to fill in the gaps – which is not cool. [...] The Sword Coast deserved a lot better than this, especially for the price you pay. This book is my first real disappointment with Dungeons & Dragons, Fifth Edition and unless you want some of the new PC options or are a completionist, this is a very easy pass".

In a review of Sword Coast Adventurer's Guide in Black Gate, Howard Andrew Jones said "this a wonderful campaign sourcebook, and a great inspiration for game masters. Two thumbs up."
