= List of The Legend of Vox Machina episodes =

The Legend of Vox Machina is an American adult animated fantasy action television series produced by Metapigeon, Titmouse, Inc., and Amazon MGM Studios, which premiered on Amazon Prime Video on January 28, 2022. The series is based on the first campaign of the Dungeons & Dragons web series Critical Role. It stars Laura Bailey, Taliesin Jaffe, Ashley Johnson, Matthew Mercer, Liam O'Brien, Marisha Ray, Sam Riegel, and Travis Willingham, reprising their roles from the campaign.

The first season aired from January to February 2022. A second season aired from January to February 2023. A third season aired in October 2024. It was renewed for a fourth season the same month. The fourth season premiered June 3, 2026. A July 2025 announcement from Amazon stated that the show was renewed for a fifth and final season.

== Series overview ==
Season	Episodes	Originally released	
Season	Episodes	First released	Last released
1	12	January 28, 2022	February 18, 2022
2	12	January 20, 2023	February 10, 2023
3	12	October 3, 2024	October 24, 2024
4	12	June 3, 2026	June 24, 2026

== Episodes ==
=== Season 1 (2022) ===
No. overall	No. in season	Title	Directed by	Written by	Original release date
1	1	"The Terror of Tal'Dorei – Part 1"	Young Heller	Brandon Auman	January 28, 2022
The failure of multiple mercenary groups to defeat an unidentified beast burning the farmlands leads the Tal'Dorei Council to advertise a substantial reward for the beast's death publicly. This draws the attention of Vox Machina after a barfight emphasizing their lack of funds. Following a musical introduction by Scanlan, only General Krieg argues in favor of giving Vox Machina a chance. Sovereign Uriel entrusts the task to them because he is impressed with Vex's bear, Trinket. The group is taken to the Shalesteps where the creature was seen last. Following a lead from a village child, Vox Machina encounters the creature – the blue dragon Brimscythe. A battle ensues; Brimscythe leaves after nearly killing the group, leaving them reluctant to continue their quest. Vex reveals that a dragon killed the twins' mother when they were young and informs the group that she sensed something draconic when they met with the Council. They once again pass through the Shalesteps on their way back to find the village destroyed and its inhabitants killed. Feeling guilty over the deaths of the villagers, Vox Machina resolves to kill Brimscythe or die trying.
2	2	"The Terror of Tal'Dorei – Part 2"	Alicia Chan	Brandon Auman	January 28, 2022
Brimscythe swiftly wipes out a battalion of Emon soldiers; General Krieg is among the few survivors. When updating the Council, Vex surmises that Sir Fince may be in league with the dragon based on her dragon sense. At Gilmore's Glorious Goods, Vax and Pike ask Shaun Gilmore if he knows anything about dragons. While flirting with Vax, Gilmore reveals a bit of cryptic poetry on blue dragons from a book. Scanlan and Grog stealthily follow Fince to Krieg's mansion. Vox Machina breaks into the mansion and confronts Fince before Krieg kills him. They follow Krieg through a portal into a cavern, where Krieg reveals that he is Brimscythe as he shifts forms. During the battle, Vax realizes that the poetry indicates the dragon's weakness is its neck — the group comes together to allow Grog to land the killing blow. The council rewards Vox Machina with honorary titles and the keys to their own keep in Emon, along with an invitation to an upcoming banquet of important people from across Tal'Dorei. Meanwhile, Lord Sylas and Lady Delilah Briarwood are ambushed by bandits while traveling to Emon. Sylas brutally slaughters the attackers before the couple casually continues their journey.
3	3	"The Feast of Realms"	Stanley Von Medvey	Eugene Son	January 28, 2022
Settled into their new keep, Vox Machina is informed that the banquet will be held the following evening. At the banquet, Percy is shocked at the arrival of the Briarwoods; Percy informs the group that they are the ones who violently deposed his family to take control of Whitestone. Vax infiltrate the Briarwoods' suite. During the meal, Sylas magically charms Uriel into ignoring any suspicious activity coming from Whitestone, while Delilah claims that the de Rolos abdicated in shame. Percy publicly accuses Delilah of lying before the Briarwoods retire to their suite. Vax discovers a hidden book in the suite that mentions an entity known as the Whispered One. When the Briarwoods catch Vax, Sylas displays vampiric qualities before Vax escapes. The Briarwoods' pursuit of Vax draws the rest of Vox Machina into a battle with the couple in the courtyard, while Scanlan distracts the banquet guests with a musical performance. Although the Briarwoods outmatch Vox Machina, the couple focuses on escape, leaving their coachman Desmond behind. Percy, enraged and overtaken by a shadowy force, shoots Desmond and attempts to question him about the Briarwoods, but is interrupted by Sovereign Uriel, who orders the arrest of Vox Machina.
4	4	"Shadows at the Gates"	Young Heller	Ashly Burch	February 4, 2022
Sovereign Uriel orders Vox Machina to be arrested for disrupting the banquet and for assaulting the Briarwoods' coachman. Lady Allura manages to temper Uriel enough that Vox Machina is placed under house arrest at their keep, rather than jailed immediately. Throughout the same night, undead beings risen and controlled by the Briarwoods attack the keep to retrieve Delilah's book and eliminate Vox Machina. With Pike's connection to the Everlight broken, her magic is unavailable to help in the onslaught. After fending off the incursion after Keyleth generates sunlight to weaken them enough to be destroyed, Jarrett, the sole survivor of the city guard detail tasked with detaining Vox Machina, allows the group to escape after they promise to avenge his men and free Sovereign Uriel from the magical charm of the Briarwoods. Pike chooses to stay behind, feeling it necessary to visit a temple as part of rebuilding her connection with the Everlight.
5	5	"Fate's Journey"	Alicia Chan	Jennifer Muro	February 4, 2022
After getting supplies from Gilmore, Vox Machina sets out to Whitestone. Along the way, Vex attempts to help Percy express his emotions while Grog is depressed by Pike's departure. The group is attacked by undead monsters sent by Delilah to retrieve her book. Scanlan, holding the book, is taken by the creatures but the group manages to save him at the cost of losing the book as well as their supplies and transport. While resting for the night, the group tells stories and jokes while Vax and Keyleth slowly bond, despite Vex telling her brother not to do so. Percy does not participate in the revelry and later lies awake spinning the barrel of his gun; five of its six chambers are engraved with the names of people involved with overthrowing and killing his family. Meanwhile, Pike stays at a temple in hopes of connecting with the Everlight. The group arrives at Whitestone which is now a desolate slum with many of its citizens hiding indoors. They come across the Sun Tree at the center of the city and are horrified to find villagers, including children, hanging from the tree dressed like them.
6	6	"Spark of Rebellion"	Stanley Von Medvey	Mae Catt	February 4, 2022
Several rebellion members against the Briarwoods, led by Percy's old friend Archibald Desnay, are captured by Captain Kerrion Stonefell. After a failed interrogation led by himself and Duke Vedmire, Stonefell orders Archibald to be executed the following day. Vox Machina agrees to help rescue them after learning this from Keeper Yennen, a religious leader who secretly supports the rebellion. After breaking into the prison the group manages to free the rebels and Archibald, only to be caught and surrounded by Stonefell and the guards. The rebels and Vox Machina fight the guards and slowly retreat, while Percy stays behind to confront and execute Stonefell, whose name is magically erased from Percy's gun upon his death. While escaping and burning down the prison, Archibald informs Percy that his sister Cassandra is alive and under the Briarwoods' care.
7	7	"Scanbo"	Young Heller	Sam Riegel and Travis Willingham	February 11, 2022
A flashback shows Professor Anders tutoring Percy and Cassandra on the powers of residuum – a mineral which can enhance arcane powers and is refined from whitestone rocks. The children witness an argument between Anders and their parents as they deny his request for a residuum refinery. Having rescued Archibald in the present, Vox Machina return to a resistance basement hideout. Vax, Vex and Scanlan confront Percy about pointing his pistol at allies during the prison break. Percy explains how the plans for his pepperbox pistol came to him in a revenge-fueled dream. The tension is diverted to Keyleth when she accidentally starts a fire whilst trying to heal the Sun Tree – the roots of which partly come through the wall of the building. The next morning Vox Machina and Archibald plan a rescue of Cassandra. Scanlan proposes he provides a distraction in a solo mission to burn down Duke Vedmire's house. The other members of Vox Machina doubt his ability, yet reluctantly agree to his offer. With Scanlan's distraction successful; Vox Machina move on Professor Anders' house – only to find they have walked into a trap. Anders cuts Cassandra's throat in front of Percy.
8	8	"A Silver Tongue"	Alicia Chan	Marc Bernardin	February 11, 2022
Professor Anders attacks the group and then attempts to escape after slitting Cassandra's throat; Keyleth saves her with druidic healing. Vox Machina's pursuit leads to a fight where Anders uses magic to take control of Grog, Vex, Keyleth and Vax to force them to try and kill Percy. Percy’s eyes flicker black as he figures out how to ricochet a bullet through Anders' mouth disrupting the magic. Percy then puts on his plague mask and becomes wreathed in black smoke as he uses the Pepperbox to kill Anders, horrifying his friends and Cassandra; Anders' name dissipates from Percy's gun barrel. Vox Machina finds evidence for an upcoming ritual on the solstice but do not know what it could be. Keyleth creates the crest of De Rolo in the sky, and in response, Delilah Brairwood casts a spell to summon zombies to attack. Elsewhere, Pike tries to reconnect with the Everlight and attempts to find balance between her faith and her friendships. Scanlan encounters the zombies and rejoins his friends.
9	9	"The Tide of Bone"	Stanley Von Medvey	Kevin Burke and Chris "Doc" Wyatt	February 11, 2022
In a flashback, Delilah makes a deal with the Whispered One to keep a dying Sylas by her side; he is restored as a vampire. Back in the present, the safe house that Vox Machina and the surviving resistance members are hiding in is attacked by the undead. Pushed on to the streets, Archie is killed by Vedmire during the onslaught. Cassandra convinces Percy to take up the mantle of leadership, and he rallies the people of Whitestone to join the fight. Vax confesses his love to Keyleth while Vox Machina and the resistance prepare to make a last stand at the Sun Tree, only for an astral projected Pike to appear and bless everyone's weapons with the power of the Everlight, allowing them to defeat the horde of undead. The townspeople kill Vedmire, and Vox Machina proceed to the Briarwoods' castle, entering through a secret tunnel to the dungeons. There they find Dr. Anna Ripley imprisoned, who offers to give them information on the Briarwoods in exchange for her release, but Percy holds her at gunpoint with black smoke emerging around him.
10	10	"Depths of Deceit"	Young Heller	Jennifer Muro	February 18, 2022
A flashback reveals Ripley's role in the murder of the de Rolo family and Percy's subsequent torture under her hands. In the present, Percy holds Ripley at gunpoint, but Cassandra stops him. Pike uses divine magic, sensing a demonic force clouding his soul. After a tense negotiation, Vox Machina has Ripley lead them to the ziggurat deep below Whitestone Castle. Eventually making their way to the residuum refining room. Cassandra's name appears on the barrel of Percy's gun, as she hits a button trapping Vox Machina and Ripley in the room. Only Vax is able to slip under the descending transparent walls. However, Sylas is once again able to charm him. Percy demands answers from Cassandra, her eyes revealing she is also charmed - she declares she is part of the Briarwood family. As the Briarwoods, Cassandra and Vax walk away, the room rapidly fills with acid. Scanlan uses magic to hold the party above the acid and Vex refocuses Percy with a slap. Together, the group determines how to switch off the acid. Vox Machina then races towards the ziggurat. Meanwhile, Delilah notes to Sylas that they have two potential sacrifices as the four ascend the steps of the ziggurat.
11	11	"Whispers at the Ziggurat"	Alicia Chan	Eugene Son and Travis Willingham	February 18, 2022
Vox Machina and Ripley continue to chase after Cassandra, Vax, and the Briarwoods. Meanwhile Delilah and Sylas are preparing for the ritual dedicated to the Whispered One. Once Vox Machina reaches the ziggurat, Ripley flees, taunting Percy that he is unable to shoot her without alerting the Briarwoods to the group's presence. A battle between the two groups ensues, in which Vex and Percy try to subdue their enthralled siblings while Keyleth, Pike, and Grog fight Sylas, with Keyleth eventually killing him by channeling the power of the Sun Tree into a blast of sunlight, freeing Vax and Cassandra from his charm spell. A devastated Delilah flees into the ziggurat and tries to complete the ritual early, mortally wounding Keyleth when Vox Machina enters to stop her. The ritual seemingly fails because it was performed before the solstice, summoning only a spinning black orb in place of the Whispered One. Distracted by this, Delilah is shot twice in the back by Percy. Pike tries to heal Keyleth but her astral projection is interrupted.
12	12	"The Darkness Within"	Stanley Von Medvey	Brandon Auman and Sam Riegel	February 18, 2022
A healing elixir has no effect on the lifeless Keyleth. Scanlan deduces that all nearby magic is being blocked, including Pike's astral projection. The party leave the ziggurat, dragging Delilah behind them. Grog retrieves Sylas's sword, which seems to whisper to him. Back in the refining room, Keyleth is healed the same way she did Cassandra. Percy is possessed by the smoke demon, Orthax, who reveals that he gave Percy the idea for the pepperbox and that he feasts on the souls of those killed with it. Percy is nearly tricked into killing his friends but shoots through his own hand – seemingly dispelling Orthax. Delilah attempts to escape, but Cassandra kills her. Thinking the demon is gone; Percy goes to recover the pepperbox, but Scanlan stops him and throws it into a pool of acid. An effigy of Orthax rises from the gun as it melts. Percy places Cassandra in charge of Whitestone, and Vox Machina depart for Emon. Reunited with Pike, they are summoned by Sovereign Uriel. In an abdication speech he cedes the government to the Tal'Dorei Council and praises Vox Machina for saving them. Suddenly, alarm bells start to ring as four dragons fly towards the city.

=== Season 2 (2023) ===
No. overall	No. in season	Title	Directed by	Written by	Original release date
13	1	"Rise of the Chroma Conclave"	Young Heller	Brandon Auman and Eugene Son	January 20, 2023
Emon is invaded by four dragons known as the Chroma Conclave: Raishan, a green poison dragon, Umbrasyl, a black acid dragon, Vorugal, a white ice dragon, and their leader, Thordak, a red fire dragon. They easily obliterate the city's defenses and inflict heavy casualties, including Sovereign Uriel. Separated, Vox Machina make their way to Gilmore's shop to regroup. Percy deduces that these dragons must have been planning this for years by ordering the disguised Brimscythe to dismantle Emon's army. After saving Gilmore in the wreckage of his shop, and taking what they want from his goods, he teleports them all to Vox Machina's keep. As refugees pour in, the keep is attacked by Vorugal. Keyleth uses her magic to help, and some survivors escape to Whitestone. Keeper Yennen suggests seeking help in Vasselheim; the next morning, Yennen describes a tree in Vasselheim that Keyleth can transport to. In the ruins of Emon, two dragons meet with Thordak, and Vorugal reports of Vox Machina's escape but Thordak refuses hunting them down until their plan to conquer the realm is completed. Thordak will allow Umbrasyl, however, to kill the group if he happens upon them.
14	2	"The Trials of Vasselheim"	Alicia Chan	Colleen Evanson	January 20, 2023
After being denied help in Vasselheim, Vox Machina are secretly advised to find the patron of the Slayer's Take. The twins have a history with this monster hunting guild. Grog, however, wonders off after being distracted by his new sword's voice. At the Take, the rest are met with hostility by an old "friend" of Vex's, a tiefling named Zahra and her human partner Kashaw. Zahra reveals that Vex had poached from the Take and stolen the reward money. Pike fails to rally the hunters to help fight the Chroma Conclave, however, Vox Machina are sent to meet with the patron who is revealed to be a sphinx named Osysa. As she points out each of their flaws, Grog is drawn to the Stormlord's arena and loses a brutal fight to Earthbreaker Groon. Groon states Grog must find the source of his strength if he is to become stronger. Osysa reveals to the group that they can only defeat the dragons by finding powerful weapons known as the Vestiges of Divergence. Once they have recovered a nearby vestige in the tomb for the Matron of Ravens' champion, they should find her mate who will reveal more.
15	3	"The Sunken Tomb"	Eugene Lee	Todd Casey	January 20, 2023
In a series of flashbacks, the twins are treated harshly by their elven father on account of their mixed heritage, and grow closer after running away. In the present, Pike has a divine vision of the dragons reporting to Thordak on the conquest – Westruun is now on the brink. Vox Machina arrive at a frozen lake, which Scanlan scouts. He is saved from the Adaro, humanoid fish people, by Zahra and Kashaw, who were sent to aid the group. Utilizing magic, Kashaw locates the tomb under the lake. Zahra and Keyleth open a path to the Matron's temple. Within, they fight more Adaro, and then realize Zahra and Kashaw have gone ahead to steal the Vestige known as the Deathwalker's Ward. Vax insists that they stay put while he checks for traps and descends through a crater where he finds a small mural depicting Osysa's mate. Percy notices a floor panel, which reveals a sarcophagus. Vex considers waiting for Vax to return, but Percy convinces her to open it. As Vex starts to feel guilty, Percy examines the armor, accidentally setting off a trap – instantly killing Vex. Vax returns and breaks down in tears cradling his lifeless sister.
16	4	"Those Who Walk Away"	Young Heller	Eugene Son	January 27, 2023
During a flashback, a young Vax saves Vex from imprisonment at a bandit camp. While hiding, they come across a dying bear which Vax kills to end her suffering. They then find her cub which they bring with them when escaping; Vex names it Trinket. In the present, efforts to magically revive Vex fail while Vax starts to see a vision of the Matron of Ravens preparing to take Vex's soul. Vax offers his own life in exchange for Vex's – Vex suddenly comes back to life and Vax is suddenly wearing the Deathwalker's Ward. As they leave the temple, Zahra summons an uncontrollable monster which petrifies. Vax begins to have visions of a battlefield and fighting the Matron's champion as the real monster starts to turn the group into stone until only he and Kashaw are left. After surrendering to death in the vision, Vax unlocks abilities from the Vestige which allow him to single handedly kill the monster while Kashaw restores the others. Outside Zahra apologizes and departs with Kashaw. Vax has another vision of the Matron taking the soul of a dying man; he then tells Vex about his visions. Unknown to Vox Machina, Anna Ripley is shown magically observing them as she walks towards Westruun in flames.
17	5	"Pass Through Fire"	Alicia Chan	Meredith Kecskemety	January 27, 2023
Opening with a flashback, Keyleth's mother Vilya explains to a young Keyleth the connection between the air and fire elements before Vilya departs on her Aramenté. In the present, Vox Machina come across an under attack Pyrah, the Fire Ashari settlement which guards the Fire Plane rift. They find Keyleth's father as well as Allura and Kima, who explain their escape from Emon and that they had originally sealed Thordak away in the Fire Plane. Thordak's escape tore open the rift; fire elementals have been attacking ever since, leaving Pyrah to be overwhelmed by the endless tide of creatures. Keyleth initially struggles but recalls her mother's words and passes through the rift. On the other side, she transforms into a giant fire being and closes the tear. The Fire Ashari leader blesses her mastery of air and fire; she has yet to master water and earth. Allura and Kima stay behind to continue helping the Ashari but will then head to Whitestone. Vex through the episode acquires and learns how to use a flying broomstick. A group of goliaths are shown in Westruun offering tribute to Umbrasyl. Ripley approaches and asks to speak with Umbrasyl regarding Vox Machina.
18	6	"Into Rimecleft"	Eugene Lee	Mae Catt	January 27, 2023
Grog has a nightmare where he endlessly kills people with his sword, Craven Edge, including all of Vox Machina. Following Vax's vision, the group heads into the Rimecleft to find Osysa's mate, Kamaljiori. He agrees to grant them more knowledge on the Vestiges if Vox Machina successfully complete a challenge of their choosing; of the options, they settle on the "wound him" challenge. Kamaljiori easily defeats all but Scanlan, who plays a heartfelt song about the love between him and Osysa. This emotionally wounds Kamaljiori, so he bestows Scanlan the Mythcarver Vestige. The sword gives Scanlan visions of other Vestiges: a bow hidden within the Fey Realm and a pair of gauntlets with goliaths in Westruun, causing Grog to feel unnerved. The visions are disrupted by Umbrasyl's surprise attack. In the ensuing battle, Umbrasyl mortally wounds Kamaljiori and takes Mythcarver. Keyleth prepares a shift spell to allow them to flee to the Fey Realm, however, Grog has become consumed by his sword's bloodlust and impales Pike which snaps him out of it. As Keyleth finishes the spell, Umbrasyl disrupts it enough to split the party and only Keyleth, Percy and the twins make it successfully to the Fey Realm.
19	7	"The Fey Realm"	Young Heller	Kevin Burke & Chris "Doc" Wyatt	February 3, 2023
Keyleth, Vax, Percy, and Vex find themselves in the Fey Realm and struggle to navigate its dangers. Meanwhile, Scanlan, Pike, and Grog land in a rocky landscape where Pike is badly injured, and her wound won't close because her blood is being sucked into Craven Edge. While the blade urges Grog to kill his friends, he overcomes and destroys the sword but is left without his physical strength. In the Fey Realm, the group is attacked by plants and jellyfish-like creatures. Vax and Percy eventually defeat the amalgamated creature; Vax tells Percy that he feels he is being pulled onto a different path from the group's. They encounter a satyr named Garmelie who offers to guide them and discover that the Vestige, a bow called Fenthras, is in the Shademurk Bog. Meanwhile, Thordak and Umbrasyl have a magical conversation about the Vestiges of Divergence; Thordak favors riches over "mankind's baubles" but allows Umbrasyl to keep searching. Ripley tells Umbrasyl that Thordak is a fool for dismissing the power and potential of the Vestiges, but Umbrasyl trusts Thordak's plan. Pike, Scanlan, and Grog eventually arrive at a small cottage. Garmelie leads the others to an overlook of an elven city, which he claims appeared recently and lies between them and the vestige. The twins recognize the city as Syngorn, where they grew up with their father.
20	8	"The Echo Tree"	Alicia Chan	May Chan	February 3, 2023
Garmelie insists on traveling through Syngorn. Within the city, they are brought before the twins' father, Ambassador Syldor Vessar who coldly dismisses both the twins' accomplishments and their quest for Fenthras. Percy stands up for Vex and informs Syldor that she is in fact Lady Vex'ahlia, Baroness of the Third House of Whitestone. Percy later apologizes to Vex for springing a title on her and gives her a trick arrowhead; Vex thanks Percy, as no one other than Vax has ever stood up for her. In the bog, the cursed Archfey Saundor draws Vex to the heart of the tree which contains both him and Fenthras while setting tree monsters on the others. Saundor preys on Vex's sadness from Syldor's mistreatment of her, but Vex overcomes and kills Saundor by stabbing him in the heart with the trick arrowhead; she then claims Fenthras. Garmelie opens a portal back to Tal'Dorei as payment for entertaining him. Meanwhile, Pike's great-great-grandfather Wilhand Trickfoot removes the corruption caused by Craven Edge, which should allow Grog to recover his strength. Pike and Scanlan decide to travel to Westruun to retrieve the vestige; Grog reveals his uncle killed him while wielding them.
21	9	"Test of Pride"	Eugene Lee	Sam Riegel & Travis Willingham	February 3, 2023
In a flashback, a young Grog indiscriminately slaughters smallfolk with a band of marauders known as the Herd of Storms, led by his uncle Kevdak. In the present, Pike, Scanlan, and Grog reach Westruun. Scanlan scouts ahead and encounters a gnome named Kaylie, a member of Dr. Dranzel's Traveling Troupe, hiding with the troupe and other locals. Grog tells Pike his brutal history with the Herd; encountering a cowering Wilhand changed his mind on the Herd's behavior. He was then left for dead after being beaten nearly to death by Kevdak, who wields the Titanstone Knuckles Vestige. Wilhand brought Pike to heal Grog, as Grog was banished from the Herd for saving Wilhand. Meanwhile, Umbrasyl and Ripley arrive in the city and admonish Kevdak for the reduced amount of gold. Umbrasyl informs Kevdak that he has three days to increase the tribute, or Umbrasyl will take the Vestige upon his return. Grog and Pike sneak into the city to find Scanlan and help him evacuate the survivors, who are afraid of Grog. At the city gates, Grog decides he must stand up to his uncle even though he hasn't recovered his physical strength. Kevdak beats his son Zanror in front of the Herd for undermining his rule – Grog arrives to challenge him.
22	10	"The Killbox"	Young Heller	Meredith Kecskemety	February 10, 2023
Keyleth, Vax, Percy, and Vex arrive back at Whitestone to find it hidden by a cloaking spell; they discover that three weeks had passed in Tal'Dorei during their three days in the Fey Realm. Allura views Scanlan, Pike, and Grog remotely, revealing that they are in Westruun. Grog calls out Kevdak's cowardice and hypocrisy for submitting to a dragon, then challenges him to single combat. Grog and Kevdak begin a hand-to-hand fight with Kevdak easily overpowering the weakened Grog. Pike and Scanlan are taken captive and, as Kevdak prepares to crush Pike, Grog discovers his inner strength. His rage causes his regeneration and he strikes back. Kevdak activates his gauntlets doubling him in size, and knocks Grog down. Grog states that his strength comes from his friends just as the rest of Vox Machina arrives. During the resulting melee, Vex transports Grog to a high altitude, giving him the momentum to bisect Kevdak with an axe. Grog acquires the gauntlets and names Zanror as the new leader of the Herd; before asking for assistance in killing Umbrasyl. During the post-battle festivities, Scanlan goes with Kaylie to a private bedroom where, after restraining him, she reveals herself as his daughter who is seeking vengeance for her mother.
23	11	"Belly of the Beast"	Alicia Chan	Eugene Son	February 10, 2023
Scanlan does not remember Kaylie's mother; after dressing him down, Kaylie decides against killing Scanlan and leaves him pinned by an enchanted sword that can maintain its position in space. Umbrasyl tells Thordak that Westruun has been depleted of gold, but wishes to claim the Vestige before returning. Ripley enters and reminds Umbrasyl of their deal—the power of the Vestiges in exchange for his resources. While Grog and Percy explain their plan to trap Umbrasyl, Vax visits a temple of the Matron of Ravens. Stepping into a pool of blood, he communes with the Matron. Their ensuing conversation leads Vax to commit to his role as the Matron's champion; he is charged with safeguarding the sanctity between life and death. Later on, Umbrasyl is successfully ambushed; but manages to break free and cause chaos after turning invisible. Scanlan and Vax magically enter Umbrasyl through his anus, and use Kaylie's enchanted sword to keep him from flying. Despite the best efforts of both the Herd and Vox Machina, Umbrasyl forces the sword through his body and takes off with Vax and Scanlan inside him. Grog hooks himself to Umbrasyl by lodging an axe tied to a rope into the dragon.
24	12	"The Hope Devourer"	Eugene Lee	Brandon Auman	February 10, 2023
Grog is unable to force Umbrasyl to land and is thrown off. He is gravely injured even after Pike depletes her healing magic to stabilize him. Scanlan and Vax cut their way out of Umbrasyl mid-flight; with Vax unlocking his Vestige's wings to prevent them falling to their death. Vox Machina pursue Umbrasyl to his lair, however, Umbrasyl has already recovered from the earlier fight. In the ensuing fight, every member is incapacitated one by one. Scanlan, having spent most of the fight hiding behind a rock in fear, reclaims Mythcarver and stabs it into Umbrasyl's eye. A lyrical tune channels a blast of energy through the sword killing Umbrasyl, while Ripley slips away. Vox Machina initially believe Scanlan to be dead leading to Pike kissing him before Scanlan reveals he is still alive. During a celebratory toast at Whitestone, everyone at the table falls asleep except for Vox Machina and Keeper Yennen, who reveals herself to be the green dragon Raishan in disguise, and tells Vox Machina she is in secret opposition to Thordak's plans and offers her aid. Meanwhile, Thordak is informed by Vorugal of Umbrasyl's defeat, but dismisses Vorugal's warning that Vox Machina will now target the rest of the Chroma Conclave, gazing down upon a large clutch of dragon eggs.

=== Season 3 (2024) ===
No. overall	No. in season	Title	Directed by	Written by	Original release date
25	1	"A Deadly Bargain"	Eugene Lee	Sam Riegel & Travis Willingham	October 3, 2024
Raishan discloses that she released Thordak from the Fire Plane in exchange for finding a cure for her curse, which is slowly killing her—a promise Thordak never fulfilled. As revenge, she offers to help Vox Machina find the Plate of the Dawnmartyr in Ank'Harel to defeat Thordak. However, time is short since the vestige is being pursued by another and Thordak's eggs are about to hatch. The group debates her offer; Keyleth retreats to Sun Tree with Vax following her. While kissing, Vax has a vision of Keyleth alone and mourning the rest of the party. They refuse Raishan and return to Emon to verify her claims. In the ruins, Vax discovers Thordak's eggs before encountering Vorugal. Vox Machina barely escape the dragons thanks to Raishan's help, prompting the group to accept her offer despite Keyleth's objections. Gilmore teleports them to Ank'Harel, where they plan to steal the Dawnmartyr. Scanlan leaves to find Kaylie. While infiltrating the manor, they discover the aftermath of a fight with Ripley actively stealing the vestige. They pursue her but she escapes using a teleporting cloak vestige. Percy eventually catches up with Ripley, who reveals that she is working with Percy's demon Orthax. Note: The episode was dedicated to Lance Reddick, who completed his final work for the series before his death in 2023.
26	2	"Prisoners of Ank'Harel"	Young Heller	Suzanne Keilly	October 3, 2024
Percy is kidnapped by Ripley and Orthax who wish to mass-produce firearms. Ripley tries to convince Percy to help as it will allow the oppressed to liberate themselves. Percy instead attempts to kill Ripley with a sabotaged battery. As Vox Machina trace Ripley, they are confronted by the guard who believe they stole the vestige and killed its owner. Gilmore is captured when he tries to buy the group time to escape. They manage to save Percy but fail to capture Ripley and are instead apprehended. The group is brought before Emperex J'mon Sa Ord, ruler of Ank'Harel, who dismisses their claims of innocence until Percy takes the blame, whereupon he is sentenced to "transformation", and the rest to banishment. Scanlan reunites with Kaylie; he tries to drink away his anxieties, only to become intoxicated and embarrass himself. Colliding into his friends who are being banished, Scanlan rushes to J'mon to prove Vox Machina's innocence by using Mythcarver to reveal Ripley as the true culprit. When J'mon learns of the group's true intentions, they confide that the vestige was a fake. The real Dawnmartyr is with a collector located in the Hells of Despath.
27	3	"Vexations"	Karen Guo	Meredith Kecskemety	October 3, 2024
In Emon, Thordak become suspicious of Raishan and issues a public bounty for Vox Machina. In Whitestone, Allura reaches out to her former teammate Dohla who is now a member of the Draconian Assembly since Draconia guards a rift to the Hells through which the party might travel. Various relationship moments occur in the evening – Percy and Vex have sex; Vax rejects Keyleth because he does not wish to put her through the pain of outliving him; and Scanlan mistakes emotional support from Pike for a romantic advance. In Draconia, Percy and Vex stay behind to guard the rift as the rest of Vox Machina enter. They are then ambushed by Vorugal; Dohla betrayed them due to her jealousy of Allura and Kima and made a bargain to spare Draconia. Percy, Vex, Allura and Kima flee down the slopes of Draconia, but Dohla summons an avalanche which separates Kima from the group as she tumbles down the mountain. Vorugal eats Dohla when she annoys him; the dragon traps Percy, Vax, and Allura in a cave to hunt Kima. There, Vex declines a relationship with Percy but expresses faith in the rest of Vox Machina, Kima, and themselves.
28	4	"Hell to Pay"	Eugene Lee	Brandon Auman & Travis Willingham	October 10, 2024
The Everlight warns Pike about the dangers of the Hells of Despath. Disguised by Scanlan, Vox Machina explores the city near the portal. Pike feels an entity reaching out to her; when their disguises fail, she leads them to the tower of Zerxus, a collector, and his massive demonic bodyguard, Yenk. Zerxus reveals the vestige was lost in a wager. Pike agrees to a high-stakes card game enforced by a magical contract: if she wins, the Dawnmartyr is hers; if she loses, she becomes his eternal servant. During the game, players must truthfully answer a question or incur a magical penalty. Zerxus manipulates Pike's insecurities about her bond with the Everlight, causing her to reveal her card's location. As a result, Zerxus wins, enslaving Pike. Determined, she challenges him to a rematch, wagering her friends' souls for her freedom and the vestige. Pike turns Zerxus's tactics against him, prompting him to reveal his own emotional conflicts. Seemingly gracious in defeat, he grants Pike the Dawnmartyr and gives them a token to deter other creatures as they leave. Secretly Zerxus feels satisfied, believing he has weakened Pike's bond with the Everlight. He instructs Yenk to pursue and only leave Pike alive.
29	5	"The Frigid Doom"	Young Heller	Story by : Marque Franklin-William; Teleplay by : Mae Catt	October 10, 2024
In a flashback to their adventuring days, Allura and Kima bicker over how to handle a chimera. In the present, Allura, Vex and Percy save Kima then rush to reopen the rift while being pursued by Vorugal. The rest of Vox Machina dive into the rift with Yenk following behind. While aiming at Vox Machina, Vorugal and Yenk hit each other – leading to a violent clash between the massive creatures. Vorugal emerges victorious, but heavily wounded. Kima drives Mythcarver into Vorugal's wounded chest and Vox Machina follows up with a full frontal assault. Vex shoots an arrow into the same wound, to which Keyleth attaches vines that constrict – destroying the dragon's heart. A tree grows from the dying dragon as Kima delivers the killing blow. In Emon, Thordak rages at the outcome, but takes comfort in knowing that his now-hatching progeny only need their first meal to complete their birth. Ripley then appears with a suggestion of where they can get that meal. Back in Draconia, Vex and Percy reconcile and Scanlan uses a magical key he got from Umbrasyl's hoard to create "Chateau Shorthalt" so the party can have a comfortable evenings rest.
30	6	"The Coming Storm"	Karen Guo	Liam O'Brien & Eugene Son	October 10, 2024
In Chateau Shorthalt, the party indulge themselves while Scanlan is depressed over his inability to mend his relationship with Kaylie, inadvertently revealing her existence to everyone. Pike comforts Scanlan with a vision which reveals that Kaylie secretly misses him. The group leaves to Whitestone while Scanlan stays behind to find Kaylie. When arriving, they discovered Whitestone has been attacked by Thordak's hatchlings. Vox Machina manages to drive the hatchlings away, but the civilian population suffers heavy casualties. When Raishan appears, the group at first blames her for the slaughter until Percy realizes it was Ripley's doing. Vox Machina ends their alliance with Raishan while Vex comforts Percy, who vows revenge against Ripley, asking for her help.
31	7	"Cloak and Dagger"	Eugene Lee	Marisha Ray & Eugene Son	October 17, 2024
In a flashback, Ripley's village is attacked by the Cerberus Assembly, killing her father. Scanlan arrives in Nicodranas only to discover Kaylie and the troupe have already left. Percy deduces Ripley's location, and, despite knowing it is a trap, Vox Machina fly to the island of Glintshore to ambush her. Percy tells Vex he wants to make their relationship public, and that he is in love with her, shocking her. Distracted, she triggers a gas trap causing all of the party to experience hallucinations of their worst fears, whilst Ripley sneaks in and takes Percy. Percy again rejects Ripley's offer to work together, causing a shootout between him and her henchmen. Pike, remembering Zerxus, rejects the Everlight's power and instead uses her own blood to revive Vox Machina, at the cost of her energy. Percy subdues Ripley and Orthax, but decides to stop the cycle of vengeance by sparing her, Ripley however shoots and kills him before fleeing. Pike is unable to help, and a distraught Vex cradles his dead body.
32	8	"The Siege of Emon"	Young Heller	Meredith Kecskemety	October 17, 2024
In a flashback, Vox Machina break into a prison for a bounty, only to discover the prisoner is already dead. They encounter an imprisoned Percy, and decide to free him. In the present, a funeral is held for Percy. An unaware Scanlan arrives back and is horrified to learn what he missed. Vex mourns, believing Percy died without knowing she loved him back. Vax and Keyleth reconcile and spend the night together. Raishan arrives back in Whitestone, still wishing to work with them despite the end of their deal, and reveals that Thordak is the dragon who killed Elaina, the mother of the twins. The council agree to this, and they part ways to recruit prior allies such as Zahra, Kashaw, Earthbreaker Groon, the Fire Ashari, and the elves of Syngorn, where Vex stands up to her father. The army is met with little resistance, but Vox Machina discover that the back entrance has been sealed, and Raishan has betrayed them. Thordak bursts from the ground and begins attacking the main forces.
33	9	"Thordak"	Karen Guo	Kevin Burke & Chris "Doc" Wyatt	October 17, 2024
Thordak begins his attack on the army while Vox Machina splits up to help them and destroy the eggs at Grog's suggestion. Vex and Vax lead a small hoard of dragons away from the nest, giving Scanlan and Grog the chance to infiltrate it before they head back to assist their allies. In the ensuing fight, Thordak kills Kashaw, devastating Zahra. Upon arriving at the nest, Scanlan goads Grog into smashing the eggs. Thordak senses this and returns to the nest, only to discover the remains of his offspring killed while Scanlan and Grog barely escape him during which the former is knocked unconscious. Thordak prepares to kill Vox Machina as revenge for destroying his offspring, but Pike manages to absorb his fire breath after overcoming her insecurities about herself and repels it back at him, destroying the crystal on his chest in the process. However, Thordak survives just as Raishan arrives seemingly to aid him. But in a surprising turn of events, Raishan betrays Thordak and attacks him as revenge for not keeping his promise. Thordak attempts to flee, but Vax, remembering his mother's words, flies up into the air and ultimately kills him by flying through his heart. In the aftermath, Keyleth reluctantly thanks Raishan for her aid in killing Thordak and the conclave. However, Raishan reveals her true intentions to Vox Machina and disappears with Thordak's corpse.
34	10	"To the Ends of the World"	Eugene Lee	Suzanne Keilly	October 24, 2024
After Raishan disappears with Thordak's corpse, Vox Machina is left shocked by her betrayal, including Keyleth who decides to go off on her own. While Scanlan recovers, Vex decides to go after Ripley in order to avenge Percy, with Vax agreeing to accompany her. Pike finds Kaylie and convinces her to come see her father after showing her a song that he wrote for her. Keyleth reunites with her father Korrin who reveals to her an ancient ritual that can help locate people over vast distances. Korrin is reluctant to allow Keyleth to go through with the ritual because it is dangerous, and that it cannot be performed without the Council's permission. Regardless, Keyleth tells her father to call a meeting. Once the Council members arrive, Keyleth states her claims that she can perform the ritual successfully without fail, but the council's leader Uvenda denies her request, believing that she is not ready because she has not completed all of her trials and that it could kill her. After a moment of thought, Keyleth returns and proclaims her desire to perform the ritual, and the Earth Ashari's leader Pa'tice agrees to help her along with the rest of the council members, much to the chagrin of Uvenda. Pa'tice, Keyleth, and Korrin begin the ritual, but the latter begins to struggle with maintaining the connection. Meanwhile, Vex and Vax arrive at Stilben in search of a way to find Ripley. They find a tabaxi named Katari who has a pepperbox and follow him to retrieve it. Katari incapacitates Vax for a moment, but he soon recognizes him as a member of the Clasp. He takes the twins to the dock where a ship is to arrive soon at night to restock on weapons and then leaves them on their own, not wanting to become involved in their agenda. The ship soon arrives to restock, and Vex attempts to sneak past the crew, but fails, forcing the twins to fight their way through. However, the ship manages to escape. Vex and Vax manage to chase it down and get on board, only to be ambushed and captured by Ripley.
35	11	"Deadly Echoes"	Young Heller	Eugene Son	October 24, 2024
Keyleth continues to struggle with maintaining the connection during the ritual while attempting to locate Raishan. Pa'tice realizes that something is holding her back and tells Keyleth not to resist the pull of the world by giving into it. Hearing her words, Keyleth gives in, and upon realizing that her love for Vax makes her stronger, Keyleth manages to complete the ritual and successfully locates Raishan. Meanwhile, Pike brings Kaylie to the castle and encourages her to talk to her father. Kaylie admits that she still misses him just as Scanlan regains consciousness, and they reconcile. Keyleth contacts the rest of Vox Machina and tells them to meet her in Zephrah. Although Scanlan doesn’t want to leave Kaylie again, she encourages him to go save the world with his friends. Meanwhile, Ripley begins taunting the twins about Percy's death, only for them to escape from their restraints and attack her and her crew. After a long ensuing fight between the twins and Ripley, Vex finally kills her, avenging Percy's death. Vax then takes her gun. While resting on a nearby island, Vax reveals to Vex that he heard Percy’s voice from within Ripley’s gun, saying that his soul is probably trapped inside of it by Orthax, but she refuses to believe it before being contacted by Keyleth. After Vox Machina regroups in Zephrah, Keyleth confesses her feelings for Vax before revealing Raishan's location to the team. Keyleth leads Vox Machina to an ancient ziggurat where they discover her performing a ritual with Thordak's corpse. Raishan seemingly kills everyone but Keyleth before attempting to complete the ritual due to the latter's people infecting her with a disease that kept her weak for a long time. Keyleth seemingly kills Raishan, but all of a sudden, the former discovers that the latter has transferred her soul into Thordak's corpse.
36	12	"Souls in Darkness"	Karen Guo	Brandon Auman & Sam Riegel	October 24, 2024
Having successfully transferred her soul into Thordak's corpse, Raishan battles Keyleth. Vox Machina join the fray. Raishan seemingly defeats Keyleth, but is ultimately killed when Keyleth transfers the disease from Raishan's old body. Vax reaches out to the Matron and asks her for a way to free Percy's soul, but she warns against it. The next morning, having sensed that Percy's soul is being held prisoner by Orthax within Ripley’s gun, Vax tells everyone that he wants to bring Percy back to life using the soul transfer ritual that Raishan performed. After an ordeal in Orthax's realm, which sees Vax cursed by the Matron and Vex confessing her love, Percy is revived. Vox Machina go their separate ways for now; Vex and Percy return to Whitestone, Keyleth and Vax head off on a journey of their own, and Scanlan and Kaylie decide to travel the world together. Grog and Pike stay behind in Emon. Elsewhere, a group of cultists conduct a ritual which summons a powerful, evil being known as The Whispered One.

=== Season 4 (2026) ===
No. overall	No. in season	Title	Directed by	Written by	Original release date
37	1	"One Year Later..."	Karen Guo	Sam Riegel & Francisco Angones	June 3, 2026
Pike laments to Grog that, given a year has passed with no word, the others may no longer wish to adventure with them. They are approached by a flamboyant noble, Taryon Darrington, with a job offer — stopping the theft of his family's gemstone shipments. The culprit turns out to be Talia, a priestess of the Everlight who previously helped Pike rediscover her faith. Now disillusioned with the gods, Talia serves a new master who means to usher in a new world order. The pursuit of Talia only stops when she uses a gemstone to destroy a shrine to the Matron of Ravens. Sending Taryon to Whitestone, Pike and Grog set out to the temple where Talia once served in search of clues. In Whitestone, Percy and Vex have settled into a life of nobility. Away from prying eyes, however, Percy is trying to disable the magic-negating orb, eventually discovering it actually absorbs magic. Vex — missing the thrill of adventuring — pursues a rumor of an otherworldly creature stalking the nearby woods. Elsewhere, Talia delivers a gemstone to the cult of the Whispered One, where a blindfolded woman uses it in a profane ritual to kill, resurrect, and empower another cultist.
38	2	"Trial by Water"	Young Heller	Travis Willingham & Tasha Huo	June 3, 2026
Keyleth, along with Vax, arrives in Vesrah, the home of the Water Ashari, to complete her Aramenté. Her trial takes place in the elemental plane of water, which she travels to via a rift, and from where she must peacefully retrieve a lodestone. Once there, in exchange for letting it travel to Exandria, a kraken offers Keyleth both the lodestone and the knowledge to save Vax from the curse that is killing him. When Keyleth refuses, the kraken attempts to force its way through, but is repelled by Keyleth. Although she technically failed the trial, having proven her resolve and skill, Keyleth is proclaimed the Voice of the Tempest – her Aramenté complete. Pike and Grog search Talia's quarters at the Everlight temple, only to trigger a trap that almost kills them. Vex returns to Whitestone with the creature's severed head for Percy to examine, who theorizes it is connected to the Orb. The sudden arrival of Taryon distracts them long enough for a cultist to retrieve and rejuvenate its "pet" before escaping. The members of Vox Machina are invited to Keyleth's coronation, which the cult plans to strike.
39	3	"The Coronation"	Eugene Lee	Todd Casey	June 3, 2026
After surrendering their weapons and armor, the members of Vox Machina – with the exception of Scanlan – reunite at Keyleth's coronation, along with Kima and Allura. Awkward after a year apart and reluctant to spoil Keyleth's special day, no one shares information, not even Vax after a grave warning from the Matron of Ravens is cut short. Keyleth is recognized by the four Ashari tribes as the new Voice of the Tempest, but the party is soon crashed by the cult – calling themselves the Children of Truth, they aim to destroy the old ways, starting with the Ashari. A massacre begins; many Ashari are brutally killed or maimed, including their leaders and Keyleth's father. Tary and Percy return with Vox Machina's kit, and the tide turns when Vax is revealed as the new champion of the Matron of Ravens. After the battle, Tary identifies the crystals powering the Children of Truth's wands as shadowstone, which is only found in the mines near his home of Deastok.
40	4	"Taryon, My Wayward Son"	Karen Guo	Kelly Lynne D'Angelo	June 10, 2026
Tary brings Vox Machina to his family estate in Deastok. Tary's father, Howaardt Darrington, welcomes the esteemed heroes, but clearly thinks little of his son. Vox Machina become suspicious of Howaardt after a tour of his collection of Exandrian artifacts – including an amulet identical to the one given to Pike by Zerxus – but struggle to convince Tary of his father's misdoings. While Tary and the rest of Vox Machina track down the source of the shadowstone, Percy and Grog distract Howaardt by playing the ultimate game of chance: pulling cards from a Deck of Infinite Possibilities. The others find the shadowstone mine is fully operational, contrary to what Howaardt said, and must battle the guards. The concentration of shadowstone resonates with Zerxus's amulet, giving Pike a vision of the Whispered One's sealing by four heroes, one of which bears a strong resemblance to herself. Howaardt eventually spots the infiltration of his mine on a magical surveillance mirror, and after incapacitating Grog and Percy, goes to confront Vox Machina. Finally seeing Howaardt for who he is, Tary defeats his father and vows to restore the Darrington name; for his bravery, he is made a member of Vox Machina.
41	5	"De Rolo's Eleven"	Young Heller	Marisha Ray & Liam O'Brien	June 10, 2026
The newly expanded Vox Machina visit Gilmore for supplies to infiltrate the Cobalt Soul archive in Rexxentrum for classified information on the Whispered One. Very little of the caper goes according to plan. The High Curator successfully interrogates Tary; when obtaining the combination for the vault, Vax and Vex are affected by the truth amulet they borrowed from Gilmore, causing Vex to confess that she and Percy secretly married and Vax to confess that the Matron's curse is killing him; Percy is unable to help Keyleth disable the vault's anti-magic field when a fan of Scanlan refuses to leave him alone, forcing her to improvise after the alarm is triggered; Grog drinks the intelligence-boosting potion meant for Pike, who must fend off a stone guardian activated when Keyleth brought down the anti-magic field. They all barely escape. Fortunately, Grog – on the tail end of the potion of intelligence – is about to reveal what he learned while in the vault.
42	6	"We Are His Blood"	Eugene Lee	Francisco Angones	June 10, 2026
Grog reveals the Whispered One challenged the gods centuries ago. Their champions created the orb – an arcane siphon – to weaken and seal him in the barren dimension of Thar Amphala. Pike takes Grog to Westruun to ask Wilhand about the champion she resembles. The others return to Whitestone, where Percy and Tary collaborate to deactivate the orb. Percy with Vax and Vex with Keyleth separately reflect on Vax's impending doom. In Westruun, Pike and Grog find that many people – including Wilhand and his new lover Luisa – are under the sway of Gideon, a preacher for the Children of Truth. Initially reluctant to reveal what he knows, Wilhand identifies Pike's ancestor was a champion of the Knowing Mistress who wielded Mythcarver. Before they can leave, Luisa captures the family. Fearful of Wilhand's mortality, she attempts to make him immortal like the cult's elite members, but she botches the ritual and is slain by the cult's commander for insubordination. Pike and Grog are unable to save Wilhand. Later, Gideon reprimands the commander for losing control of her flock and risking the Trickfoots, but forgives her – Delilah Briarwood, returned from the dead.
43	7	"The Ghosts of Whitestone"	Karen Guo	Tasha Huo	June 17, 2026
A restless Percy discovers secret rooms and passages added to Whitestone Castle by the Briarwoods, along with indications of recent use. The present members of Vox Machina assemble to investigate, but are quickly separated from one another. They encounter malformed clones of Sylas Briarwood, created by Delilah attempting to cure his vampirism. Percy faces a number alone; gaining a measure of closure. Among Delilah's research, Keyleth finds the mythical Renatus Flower, said to heal any wound and undo any curse, even those divinely inflicted. Delilah could not revive it, but Keyleth hopes – with druidic care – it can cure Vax's curse. Vex meets Laudna, the Whitestone citizen hanged by the Briarwoods in her image. After returning to life unexpectedly, Delilah nurtured Laudna's dark magic. Delilah arrives, incapacitates Tary, and tells how the Whispered One – who means to become a god – offers eternal life to his servants. Emboldened by Vex, Laudna distracts Delilah long enough for Vex to rescue Vax. Delilah retrieves the last sample of Sylas's blood before collapsing the tunnels. Vox Machina escape just in time; Laudna is unaccounted for. The next morning, Keyleth plants the Renatus Flower. Pike and Grog arrive in Whitestone. The party leaves to find Scanlan.
44	8	"The Bard’s Lament"	Young Heller	Sam Riegel & Jasmine Don	June 17, 2026
Vox Machina find Scanlan, who has converted the Chateau into a roaming venue, on tour in Marquet. Believing his old friends have come to drag him back into a life of adventure, he is encouraged by Kaylie to give them a second chance. Likewise aware of Scanlan's reluctance, most of Vox Machina hope to ease him into the subject by reconnecting, but a bitter Pike opts to case the place for Mythcarver, with Tary's assistance. The two are caught by Kaylie, who impresses upon Pike that Scanlan still cares about her. Meanwhile, the others are taking recreational drugs; after Scanlan reveals he has incorporated Mythcarver into a guitar, Grog lets slip their objective. Incensed, Scanlan ejects Vox Machina from the Chateau. When the next performance begins, the newest band member – an undercover Child of Truth – attempts to steal Mythcarver. After routing the enemy bard with their combined efforts, Scanlan admits to Vox Machina that he always wore a mask around them in the fear they would otherwise reject him; he wants time to find himself, but entrusts Mythcarver to Pike. Tary reveals that he placed a tracking device on the Child of Truth.
45	9	"The Temple of Truth"	Eugene Lee	Todd Casey	June 17, 2026
Vox Machina track the "Dark Bard" (as dubbed by Tary) to the Children of Truth's desert base, where acolytes and the cult's elite – including Delilah, Talia, the Dark Bard, the "Beastmaster" encountered by Vex and Percy in Whitestone, and the "Death Knight" who bested Grog at Keyleth's coronation – (dubbed by Tary collectively as the "Unalive Five") have gathered. Noting the presence of another arcane siphon, Vox Machina form a plan. Tary, Percy, and Keyleth will place enough explosives to bury the temple and the siphon; the others will sneak inside to kill the elite cultists within the siphon's radius to prevent them from reviving. During the infiltration, it is learned that an amulet of the Whispered One is required to pass safely through the siphon into Thar Amphala. The plan is discovered, and Vox Machina is unable to permanently slay any of the elite cultists, who begin to retreat through the siphon. Pike, bent on revenge, stays to fight despite the fuses being lit. Grog attempts to rescue her, but is killed when the Death Knight throws him into the siphon. As the bombs detonate and the temple crumbles, the others are unable to stop a grieving Pike from using Zerxus's amulet to enter Thar Amphala.
46	10	"The Poisoned Ear"	Karen Guo	Travis Willingham	June 24, 2026
In Thar Amphala, the Children of Truth lead Pike to the Whispered One, whose mortal guise turns out to be Gideon. He disarms and tempts Pike, painting the gods as jealous overlords whereas he means to free the world from death and suffering. He offers to resurrect Grog, and everyone else Pike has lost, in exchange for her blood; its secret celestial origins would enable his apotheosis. Meanwhile, Vox Machina resolve to rescue Pike by reactivating the orb beneath Whitestone. Keyleth makes an elixir out of the Renatus Flower. The Matron of Ravens warns Vax that he will soon die, but so too will the Whispered One. Tary replicates the Children of Truth's medallions for safe passage through the orb, but Vox Machina's closest allies attempt to stop them from reactivating it, believing the risks are too great. Tary stays behind to occupy them. Once in Thar Amphala, Vax realizes the Matron's "curse" is a blessing in disguise.
47	11	"Let the End Begin"	Young Heller	Sam Riegel & Kelly Lynne D'Angelo	June 24, 2026
The Matron's power enables Vax to locate Pike and see where the Children of Truth inserted shadowstone into their bodies – the key to their immortality, which his holy daggers can break. After slaying the Beastmaster and commandeering his pets as mounts, Vox Machina fly to the Whispered One's tower, where he prepares with Delilah to ascend. While the others engage and systematically slay the rest of the Unalive Five, Vax infiltrates the tower. He finds Grog's reconstituted body and Pike, who – overcome with guilt and resentment toward Vox Machina and the gods – has joined the Whispered One.
48	12	"The Ascension"	Eugene Lee	Fransisco Angones	June 24, 2026
The others arrive, only for Pike to reveal that she has already given her blood for the ritual. She prevents Vox Machina from interrupting it; each side tries to reason with the other. During the fight, Grog is restored to life. Learning what Pike has done, he rebukes her to do the right thing. Vox Machina arrive in time to stop Delilah from completing the ritual, slaying her. In the ensuing battle with the Whispered One, he is slain by Vax and Mythcarver wielded by Keyleth. Vox Machina escape from Thar Amphala before the dimension implodes. Vax is fed the Renatus elixir to save him from the Matron's deal. Vox Machina appears triumphant, but the Whispered One – alive, and now a god – reveals that the ritual required his death, and that he orchestrated their reunion so he could put them into a position to kneel before him – televised across Exandria by the Children of Truth to appropriate people's faith in them as heroes to empower himself further – or else he will kill Vax, who no longer has the Matron's blessing. All of Vox Machina submit, save for Vax, and for his defiance the Whispered One disintegrates him.
