= Neal Acree =

American composer

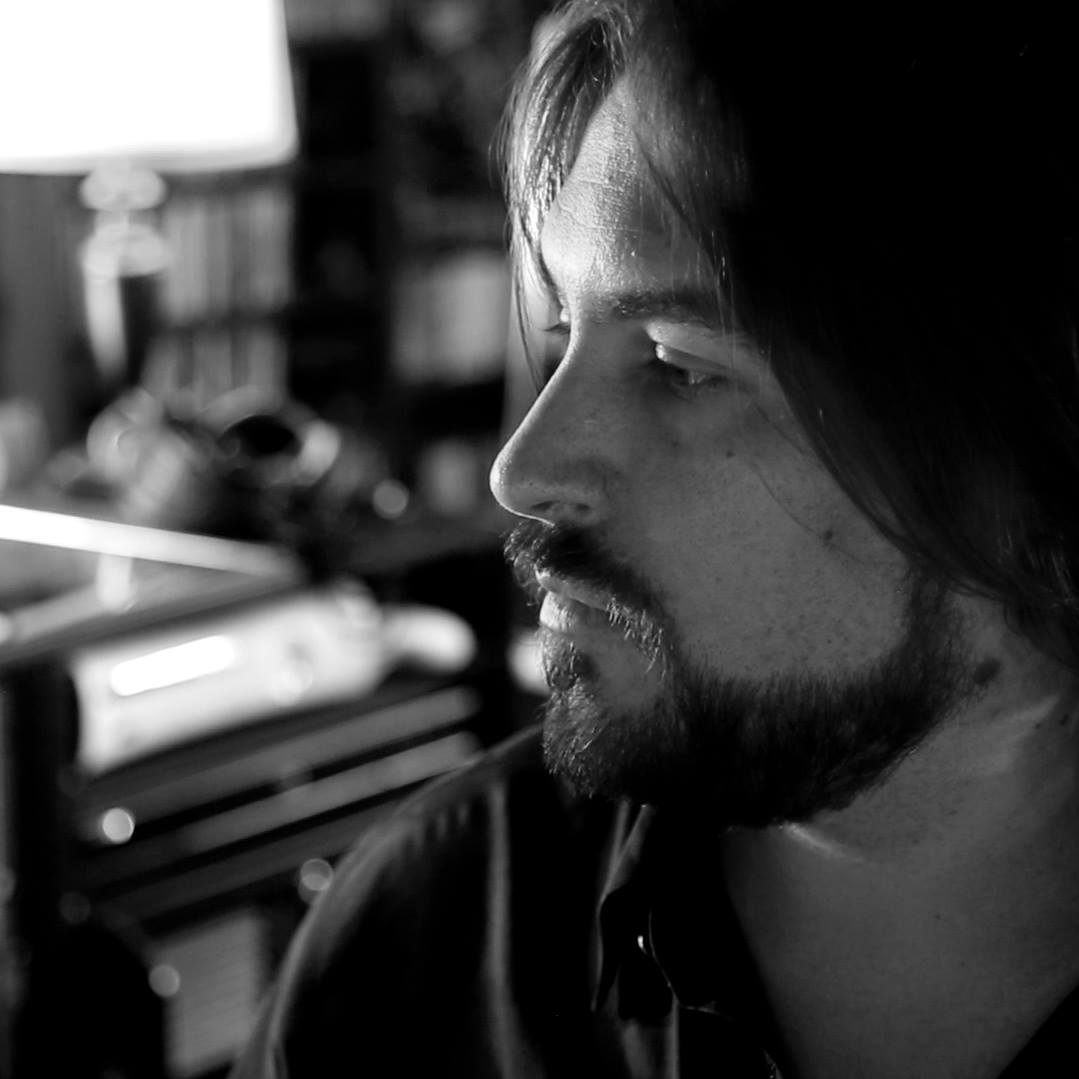
- Acree in his studio

Background information
- Born: July 11, 1974 (age 52); Tarzana, California, U.S.
- Occupation: Composer
- Years active: 1997–present
- Labels: Azeroth Records, FreeClyde Music, MIM, Madison Gate Records, Materia Collective

Neal Acree (born July 11, 1974) is an American composer of film, television, and video game music. He has scored 30 feature films, contributed music to the popular Blizzard Entertainment video game franchises StarCraft II, World of Warcraft, Diablo III, Overwatch, as well as the Chinese MMO Revelation Online. His television work includes the series Stargate SG-1, Stargate Atlantis, Witchblade and the first season of Sanctuary.

== Awards ==
- Best Sound and Music Editing - Overwatch: Honor and Glory - MPSE Golden Reel Awards (2018)
- Composer of the Year - Massively Overpowered Online VGM Awards (2016)
- Best Expansion Score - World of Warcraft: Warlords of Draenor - Massively Overpowered Online VGM Awards (2016)
- Best Soundtrack - Revelation Online - MMOSite Readers Choice Awards (2016)
- Best Music, Video Game - Overwatch - Hollywood Music in Media Awards (2016)
- Composer of the Year - BSOSpirit Jerry Goldsmith Awards Awards (2016)
- Best Music, Video Game - Revelation Online - BSOSpirit Jerry Goldsmith Awards Awards (2016)
- Best Music, Video Game - Revelation Online - Scorecast Genius Choice Vote (2015)
- Best Cinematic/Cutscene Audio - StarCraft II: Legacy of the Void - Game Audio Network Guild Awards (2015)
- Best Music, Visual Media - World of Warcraft: Warlords of Draenor - Hollywood Music in Media Awards (2015)
- Best Sound and Music Editing - StarCraft II: Heart of the Swarm - MPSE Golden Reel Awards (2014)
- Award of Merit: Soundtrack (Motion Picture) - Assassination Games - Global Music Awards (2013)
- Award of Merit: Soundtrack (Video Game) - World of Warcraft: Mists of Pandaria - Global Music Awards (2013)
- Best Music, Game - World of Warcraft: Mists of Pandaria - Scorecast Cue Awards (2013)
- Best Music, Visual Media - Diablo III - Hollywood Music in Media Awards (2012)
- Audio of the Year - Diablo III - Game Audio Network Guild Awards (2012)
- Best Audio - Diablo III - Game Developer's Choice Online Awards (2012)
- Best Cinematic/Cutscene Audio - StarCraft II: Wings of Liberty - Game Audio Network Guild Awards (2011)
- Best Vocal (Choral) - World of Warcraft: Cataclysm (lyrics by) - Game Audio Network Guild Awards (2011)
- Best Cinematic/Cutscene Audio - World of Warcraft: Wrath of the Lich King - Game Audio Network Guild Awards (2009)
- Best Use of Music - World of Warcraft: The Burning Crusade - Telly Awards (2007)

== Nominations ==
- Outstanding Music Composition - World of Warcraft: Wrath of the Lich King - Interactive Achievement Awards (2009)
- Soundtrack of the Year - World of Warcraft: Wrath of the Lich King - Game Audio Network Guild Awards (2009)
- Music of the Year - World of Warcraft: Wrath of the Lich King - Game Audio Network Guild Awards (2009)
- Best Cinematic/Cutscene Audio - World of Warcraft: Cataclysm - Game Audio Network Guild Awards (2011)
- Outstanding Music Composition - StarCraft II: Wings of Liberty - Interactive Achievement Awards (2011)
- Outstanding Music Composition - World of Warcraft: Cataclysm - Interactive Achievement Awards (2011)
- Best Music: Visual Media - Diablo III - Hollywood Music In Media Awards (2012)
- Best Original Score for a Video Game - World of Warcraft: Warlords of Draenor - International Film Music Critics Association Awards (2014)
- Best Music, Game - StarCraft II: Legacy of the Void - Soundtrack Geek Awards (2015)
- Best Interactive Game Score - Revelation Online - Reel Music Awards (2015)
- Best Video Game Score - Revelation Online - Movie Music UK Awards (2015)
- Best Instrumental: The Chosen - Main Theme from - Revelation Online - Game Audio Network Guild Awards (2015)
- Best Original Score for a Video Game - Revelation Online - International Film Music Critics Association Awards (2015)
- Video Game Score of the Year - StarCraft II: Legacy of the Void - ASCAP Composer's Choice Awards (2015)

== Video game music ==
- World of Warcraft: The Burning Crusade (opening cinematic) (2006)
- World of Warcraft: Wrath of the Lich King (opening cinematic) (2008)
- StarCraft II: Wings of Liberty (2010)
- World of Warcraft: Cataclysm (2010)
- Diablo III (2012)
- World of Warcraft: Mists of Pandaria (2012)
- Starcraft II: Heart of the Swarm (2013)
- Diablo III: Reaper of Souls (2014)
- World of Warcraft: Warlords of Draenor (2014)
- Revelation Online (2015)
- Imperial Reign (2015)
- StarCraft II: Legacy of the Void (2015)
- Overwatch (2016)
- World of Warcraft: Legion (2016)
- World of Warcraft: Battle for Azeroth (2018)
- Wangzhe Rongyao: Chuzheng (2019)
- Rend (2019)
- World of Warcraft: Shadowlands (2020)

== Television music ==
- Sanctuary (first season)
- Stargate Atlantis
- Stargate SG-1
- Stargate Universe
- Witchblade
- The Legend of Vox Machina
- The Mighty Nein

== Film music ==
- Militia (2000)
- Crash Point Zero (2001)
- They Crawl (2001)
- Critical Mass (2001)
- Ablaze (2001)
- Venomous (2001)
- Gale Force (2002)
- Project Viper (2002)
- Lost Treasure (2003)
- Deadly Swarm (2003)
- The Curse of the Komodo (2004)
- Method (film) (2004)
- Gargoyle: Wings of Darkness (2004)
- Cerberus (2005)
- 7 Seconds (2005)
- Crash Landing (2005)
- Throttle (2005)
- Juncture (2007)
- Stargate: The Ark of Truth (additional music) (2008)
- Stargate: Continuum (additional music) (2008)
- Hallowed Ground (2008)
- The Mechanic starring Jason Statham (additional music) (2010)
- Witchville (2011)
- War of the Dead (2011)
- Assassination Games starring Jean-Claude Van Damme (2011)
- Six Bullets starring Jean-Claude Van Damme (2012)
- Falcon Rising starring Michael Jai White (2014)
- The Saint (2017)
- Animal World (2018)
