= The Legend of Vox Machina =

2022 fantasy animated series

- Screenshot of title card
- Genre: Action adventure; Comedy drama; Fantasy
- Created by: Critical Role
- Based on: Critical Role (campaign one); Dungeons & Dragons
- Developed by: Chris Prynoski; Critical Role
- Showrunner: Brandon Auman
- Voices of: Laura Bailey; Taliesin Jaffe; Ashley Johnson; Matthew Mercer; Liam O'Brien; Marisha Ray; Sam Riegel; Travis Willingham
- Music by: Neal Acree
- Country of origin: United States
- Original language: English
- No. of seasons: 4
- No. of episodes: 48 (list of episodes)

Production
- Executive producers: Chris Prynoski; Sam Riegel; Travis Willingham; Brandon Auman; Laura Bailey; Taliesin Jaffe; Ashley Johnson; Matthew Mercer; Liam O'Brien; Marisha Ray; Shannon Prynoski; Ben Kalina
- Running time: 24–30 minutes
- Production companies: Metapigeon; Titmouse, Inc.; Amazon MGM Studios (Note: Credited as Amazon Studios until 2023)

Original release
- Network: Amazon Prime Video
- Release: January 28, 2022 – present

Related
- The Mighty Nein

The Legend of Vox Machina is an American adult animated fantasy television series produced by Metapigeon, Titmouse, Inc., and Amazon MGM Studios, which premiered on Amazon Prime Video on January 28, 2022. The series is based on the first campaign of the Dungeons & Dragons web series Critical Role. It stars Laura Bailey, Taliesin Jaffe, Ashley Johnson, Matthew Mercer, Liam O'Brien, Marisha Ray, Sam Riegel, and Travis Willingham, reprising their roles from the campaign.

The first season consists of twelve episodes, the first ten of which were funded via a Kickstarter campaign. In November 2019, ahead of the series premiere, it was renewed by Amazon for a second season which premiered on January 20, 2023. In October 2022, ahead of season two's premiere, Amazon renewed the series for a third season, which premiered on October 3, 2024. It was renewed for a fourth season the same month, which premiered on June 3, 2026. In July 2025, Amazon renewed the show for a fifth and final season.

The series received widespread acclaim from critics and audiences, with praise for its animation, humor, voice acting, action sequences, writing, and faithfulness to the actual play web show. A spin-off series set twenty years later, The Mighty Nein, premiered on November 19, 2025 and adapts Critical Role's second campaign.

== Premise ==
=== Setting ===
The series is set on Exandria, a fictional world created by Matthew Mercer in 2012 for his personal Dungeons & Dragons campaign, which then launched as the actual play web series Critical Role in 2015. Most of the story takes place on the continent of Tal'Dorei in locations such as the metropolis of Emon and the city-state of Whitestone.

=== Synopsis ===
The first two episodes of the series depict "an all-new story about the seven-member Vox Machina team at D&D Level 7 on their first 'grown-up' mission, which occurs prior to Critical Role's first RPG show". The series then adapts the Briarwood arc from the original web series, "in which the Vox Machina crew avenge the murder of the rulers of the town of Whitestone and most of their offspring by the evil Lord and Lady Briarwood". In the second and third season the series also adapts "other classic Vox Machina story arcs", such as the Chroma Conclave arc. Season four picks up a year after the events of season three. During that time the members of Vox Machina have parted ways to focus on themselves.

== Cast and characters ==
The members of Vox Machina are the following seven characters (and one significant pet):

- Laura Bailey as Vex'ahlia "Vex" de Rolo, née Vessar, a half-elf ranger and the twin sister of Vax'ildan. Their mother was killed by a dragon before the events of the series, so Vex has studied dragons in the hope of eventually finding the one responsible; she feels a pain in her head whenever a dragon is close by. Bailey also voices the twins' mother Elaina.
- Taliesin Jaffe as Percival "Percy" Fredrickstein von Musel Klossowski de Rolo III, a human gunslinger whose family were once the rulers of Whitestone, a city-state within Tal'Dorei. He barely escaped alive from a coup d'état led by the Briarwoods, and during the first season he sought vengeance for the murder of his family. Jaffe also voices Percy's father Lord Frederick de Rolo.
- Ashley Johnson as Pike Trickfoot, a gnome cleric of the goddess Everlight who initially struggles to harmonize her faith with her love of violence and other vices.
- Matthew Mercer as Trinket, a grizzly bear who serves as Vex's pet and companion. Mercer also voices the vampire Lord Sylas Briarwood, the shadow demon Orthax, the black dragon Umbrasyl, (Note: See image 7 in the Assets gallery.) and various other background characters throughout the series. A character based on Mercer's likeness appears in every episode of the show as an easter egg.
- Liam O'Brien as Vax'ildan "Vax" Vessar, a half-elf rogue and the twin brother of Vex'ahlia, the two being very protective of each other. O'Brien also voices the white dragon Vorugal.
- Marisha Ray as Keyleth of the Air Ashari, a half-elf druid. She is currently undergoing her Aramenté – a quest which acts as the Ashari trial of leadership. Ray also voices the hollow one Laudna.
- Sam Riegel as Scanlan Shorthalt, a gnome bard and raunchy hedonist whose most frequently useful spell is a giant purple floating hand.
- Travis Willingham as Grog Strongjaw, a goliath barbarian and the best friend of Pike, known for his incredible might and slow wit.

== Episodes ==
Season	Episodes	Originally released	
Season	Episodes	First released	Last released
1	12	January 28, 2022	February 18, 2022
2	12	January 20, 2023	February 10, 2023
3	12	October 3, 2024	October 24, 2024
4	12	June 3, 2026	June 24, 2026

== Development ==
=== Background ===
As part of a sponsorship deal between Critical Role and D&D Beyond in 2018, an animated ad spot for the platform was produced which featured the Mighty Nein characters in combat. The advertisement, which was animated by Kamille and Kevin Areopagita, "opened doors" for The Legend of Vox Machina to be produced.

=== Kickstarter ===
On March 4, 2019, the Critical Role cast launched a Kickstarter campaign to raise funds for a 22-minute animation called Critical Role: The Legend of Vox Machina Animated Special. The animated story was to be set just before the streaming portion of the campaign started—when the players were around level seven—during a time when, canonically, there is an in-game period of roughly six months when the members of Vox Machina were not all together at the same time. The cast projected a cost of US$750,000 for a single 22-minute animated short, fulfilling the other campaign rewards, and the fees associated with a crowdfunding campaign. Not knowing how long this would take to raise, the campaign length was set at 45 days.

Within an hour of launch, the Kickstarter had reached more than $1 million. At the end of the first full day, all of the announced stretch goals had been unlocked, and the total had reached more than $4.3 million. With four 22-minute episodes funded in the first 24 hours, additional stretch goals were added, expanding the project into an animated series. The first two episodes would cover the pre-stream story arc. The subsequent episodes would adapt the Briarwoods' arc, also from the Vox Machina campaign. By March 18, 2019, eight 22-minute episodes had been funded. Finally, on April 4, 2019, the last published stretch goal of $8.8 million was reached during the airing of episode 57 of campaign two, pushing the total length of the animated series to ten episodes. A "secret" $10M stretch goal of Willingham being filmed going around a haunted house was reached April 16. The final total raised by the Kickstarter when it closed on April 19, 2019, was $11,385,449 with 88,887 backers. When the campaign closed, it was one of the most quickly funded in Kickstarter history, and was the most funded Kickstarter for TV and film projects.

A number of the Kickstarter tiers offered production credits. Backers at the $2,500 and higher tiers were given a "crowd funding associate producer" credit in the end credits of the first ten episodes of season one. Those who pledged more than $20,000 were listed as "crowd funding executive producer" on those episodes.

=== Production ===
The Critical Role cast reprise their respective Vox Machina roles, with the exception of Orion Acaba. The animated series was written by Jennifer Muro and others with Brandon Auman as the showrunner; the series was animated by Titmouse, Inc. with character design by Phil Bourassa and other animation renderings by South Korea's Production Reve. Willingham told Inverse that "it took outsider perspectives to make the stories they told in tabletop comprehensible for newcomers and fresh for existing fans"; Willingham said that "the Briarwood Arc was around 35 hours. We had to squish that down into about six". The music for the series was primarily composed by Neal Acree, with Sam Riegel and Mr. Fantastic contributing to Scanlan's songs.

In November 2019, Amazon Studios announced that they had acquired the streaming rights to The Legend of Vox Machina, and had commissioned 14 additional episodes (two additional episodes for season 1 and a second season of 12 episodes). The cast went with Amazon as it "gave them the most freedom" in developing the show such as keeping it as an adult animation project. Ray, in an interview with Polygon, said "we lucked out with Amazon. There were other potential distributors that we were talking about that were more interested in making it maybe a children's show, or wanting to go a different direction, or [make it into a] more serious political fantasy, a la Game of Thrones". The project was originally slated for release in late 2020; however, in June 2020, it was announced that the debut would be missed due to the COVID-19 pandemic. The release was delayed to 2022.

The show was renewed for a third season before the season two premiere. Riegel stated that while pitching the series, the team felt that the show could comprise five seasons and had always intended for five seasons.

=== Changes from the campaign ===
Cori McCreery, for WWAC in 2019, highlighted that Orion Acaba and his character Tiberius would not appear in the animated series "despite his being present for some" of the original adventures since "the Critical Role team had a falling out with" Acaba which led to the actor and his character "leaving the game pretty early on into the stream". McCreery wrote that "part of the beauty of adaptations is that you can change things that no longer fit the story you want to tell". On adapting hundreds of hours of a live streamed actual play, Riegel explained that "Vox Machina as a group" was altered the most. He noted that during the third season, the party goes "to different places in different orders" and split up and "reunite in different ways" so "the whole linear arc of the season differs from the campaign a lot". Ashley Johnson highlighted that they were able to weave her character Pike into the adaptation in places where her character did not appear in the original campaign due to Johnson's scheduling conflicts when filming Blindspot.

Mercer commented that "hindsight" and the expansion of Exandria's history since the original campaign allows them to incorporate later developed aspects of the lore at earlier moments in the animated adaptation. Petrana Radulovic of Polygon highlighted the "impactful" inclusion of Zerxus Ilerez, played by Luis Carazo, who was originally created for Exandria Unlimited: Calamity – in the canon, the Calamity occurs "centuries before the events of The Legend of Vox Machina", however, Zerxus as a character "didn't even exist till five years after the original Vox Machina campaign ended, so the entire interaction with Pike is new to the show". Radulovic noted that "the current story can now more directly seed in bigger world-building and overarching plots that will come into play down the line" since it can take the original "unscripted moments" and turn them into "more deliberate foreshadowing". Harvey Randall of PC Gamer noted that The Legend of Vox Machina "hasn't been a stranger to narrative departures from its source material, obviously, but those changes have mostly been in the service of efficiency" until the third season which featured more impactful narrative changes.

== Release ==
An update posted to the Kickstarter campaign in 2019 assured backers they would have free access to the first season. In January 2022, Critical Role announced that Kickstarter backers would have free early access to the first two episodes from January 25 to 27. To access the first season, Kickstarter backers would need either an Amazon Prime subscription or would need to register for a free trial of Amazon Prime.

The first season premiered on January 28, 2022, on Amazon Prime Video; the soundtrack for the first season premiered the same day digitally. The second season premiered on January 20, 2023. As with the first season; the second season was released in batches of three episodes per week, for a total of twelve episodes. The third season premiered on October 3, 2024; as with previous seasons, the third season released in batches of three episodes per week, for a total of twelve episodes. Preceding the release of the third season, Amazon released the first two seasons on their YouTube channel for free for a limited time. The show was also renewed for a fourth season the same month. The fourth season is scheduled to premiere on June 3, 2026. Ahead of the release of the fourth season, Amazon announced that The Legend of Vox Machina was renewed for a fifth and final season.

The Mighty Nein, a spin-off series set twenty years later, premiered on November 19, 2025 and adapts Critical Role's second campaign.

== Reception ==
=== Pre-release ===
Multiple outlets, such as Variety, the Los Angeles Times, and CNBC, reported that the Kickstarter became the largest one for Film & Video, surpassing the previous record holder Mystery Science Theater 3000, with total funding of more than $11.3 million from more than 88,000 backers. Variety highlighted that "Critical Role started working on the project in the spring of 2018. [...] After getting snubbed by Hollywood, CR decided to take a crack at bringing the project to life on Kickstarter. [...] Critical Role knew they had a big and engaged fanbase but the team didn't expect the flood of pledges that has poured in. On Twitch, between 30,000–40,000 people typically watch live with another 150,000 views on-demand, according to Willingham. The episodes on YouTube typically hit around 250,000 views in the first 24 hours. All told, each episode garners around 1 million views". The Los Angeles Times highlighted that the Kickstarter bested "bigger-name properties like Mystery Science Theater 3000, revived by Netflix in 2017, and Veronica Mars, which became a feature film [...]. Critical Role has evolved into a mini media empire, attracting more than half a million viewers every week to YouTube, Twitch and their own site, Critrole.com. The friends have transformed their homegrown characters into a top 10 comic book on Comixology; sell out their live shows; and draw lines around the block at comic book stores and convention signings. The Amazon deal follows a partnership with the animation studio Titmouse".

=== Critical response ===
The first six out of twelve episodes of the first season were given to critics to review ahead of the series premiere. The first season of The Legend of Vox Machina received a generally positive response from critics. On the review aggregator website Rotten Tomatoes, 100% of 38 critics' reviews are positive, with an average rating of 8.60/10. The website's consensus reads: "Fluidly animated and intelligently scripted, The Legend of Vox Machina is an addictive treat for fans of Dungeons & Dragons-style RPGs". Multiple reviews highlighted the challenges in adapting the lengthy source material and that the show has some pacing issues, however, once it reaches the Briarwood arc the show takes off. According to market research company Parrot Analytics, the first season was the most in-demand animated streaming television show in the first-quarter of 2022, and that the show had "17.9 times the average demand of all other U.S. series".

In comparing the first season to the original D&D campaign, Glen Weldon of NPR stated that The Legend of Vox Machina captures the essence of the "chaos energy" from the original actual play web series, distilling it into a more concise narrative – "storylines that stretched over hours and hours on the web series play out, here, over the course of one or two half-hour episodes". Weldon commented that "the animated series can't be everything the web series is, but then, it's aiming for a wider audience. And at that respect at least, its certainly got everything it needs to hit its target". Kevin Johnson, for The A.V. Club, commented on the quality of the animation and the show's adult themes, noting that while it includes "plenty of curse words, sexual innuendo, and brutal violence—nothing feels overwhelmingly crass or unnecessarily gratuitous" and when escalation occurs, "it matters". He particularly praised the fourth episode for its character development, tension, and striking visuals. Johnson opined that show is "good stuff, and perhaps most importantly, Vox Machina knows to let its moments–dramatic, comedic, or action-oriented–breathe for themselves". Kenneth Lowe, for Paste, wrote that "if you wanted a show about D&D with the serial numbers filed off, it's got you covered", however, it is not a kids show like the 1983 Dungeons & Dragons television series; instead, it has a similar level of graphic violence as Amazon's Invincible. He commented that "while there isn't a whole lot of diversity in the principal Critical Role cast, the show comes down on the side of a kind of casual inclusivity" and that it deliberately avoids "the racial essentialism which forms more of the bedrock of tabletop roleplaying gaming than many like to admit". Lowe opined that "The Legend of Vox Machina is a competently produced story decidedly informed by the sensibilities of a new generation of players".

Eric Francisco, for Inverse, compared the show to Avatar: The Last Airbender and Voltron in the way it conveys ideas and simplifies complex lore. Francisco commented that while Tal'Dorei as a setting might lack originality, the story has "gravitas" and highlighted Percy's arc, a gunslinger grappling with revenge, in particular as "astonishing to witness". However, he felt that the show's frequent shifts in tone blurred the "comedy and parody" line "too often". Francisco stated that The Legend of Vox Machina is "an accessible" action fantasy "despite its sourcing from a long-running Twitch show" and is "only unusual in its marriage of Tolkien-lite settings and the lurid humor of a Deadpool comic book". Cass Marshall, for Polygon, described the show as "a deeply indulgent story", "weirdly wholesome", and at times "frankly a little much"; she also thought that the animation work carried "the plot quite well, albeit not perfectly". She expressed her love for the show, noting that "Critical Role's heart and good intentions" helped overcome The Legend of Vox Machina's "initial problems" and when the major story arc began, Marshall "was fully invested". Marshall opined "this is D&D pulp at its best" and emphasized that viewers "don't need to delve into" Critical Role's "rich canon" to enjoy the series.

==== Subsequent seasons ====
Critical response of The Legend of Vox Machina
Season	Rotten Tomatoes	Metacritic
1	100% (38 reviews)	81 (4 reviews)
2	100% (20 reviews)	81 (5 reviews)
3	100% (12 reviews)	—N/a
4	100% (11 reviews)	84 (5 reviews)

Rotten Tomatoes reported that 100% of critics gave the second season a positive review with an average rating of 8.20/10, based on 20 reviews. The website's consensus reads, "double the dosage of dragons along with swashbuckling antics, The Legend of Vox Machina's sophomore season goes from strength to strength as a richly imagined adventure tale". Shannon O'Connor, for The Daily Beast, stated that "the first season of Vox Machina was an absolute blast, but Season 2 expands on it in the best possible way". O'Connor highlighted the voice cast who add "so much depth, creativity and fun to these characters". O'Connor commented that the show plays with audience expectations around fantasy tropes and that the show is not only a good adaptation but also an "uproarious, heartening, thrilling animated series in its own right". Anna Govert, for Paste, stated that the 12 episode second season is a "masterclass of adaptation" as it is based on "over 80 hours of tabletop gameplay" – the series is "unafraid of making changes and knowing the importance of character-first storytelling". Govert commented that The Legend of Vox Machina's "commitment to telling [...] meaningful stories alongside its badass fight sequences and crude humor make it feel refreshing and unique still in its second outing". She called the second season "a visual delight" with "an even clearer anime influence and a style that feels uniquely Vox Machina". Petrana Radulovic, for Polygon, commented that the "Dungeons & Dragons roots" are felt more in the second season as the characters go on a quest to acquire different objects. Radulovic highlighted that the show "might not fully gel for everyone" due to its expansive cast, huge amount of lore and raunchy comedic moments, however, "there is so much heart and fun in the grandiose adventure" which makes it special "for those it does click for". She also stated that animation is a better visual medium for fantasy – "Keyleth's elemental magic, Pike's glowing healing powers, and Scanlan's bright pink and purple bardic conjurations are really a testament to why we should see more of these shows in animation". James Grebey, for Vulture, wrote that splitting the party can be difficult in a role-playing game, however, by doing this in the adaptation "it has the benefit of being scripted and better suited to telling concurrent, coherent storylines than a harried DM" and it leads to "a trio of episodes that feel especially coherent and effective". Grebey commented that Grog and Scanlan can be "a lot, especially when their antics feel degrees sillier than whatever sad emo boy thing Vax or Percy are doing. I don't mean to keep harping on this, but the improvised, actual-play format of Critical Role supports these jarring moments of comedy better than the TV show [...]. But, when the two are on their own [...] it makes for a very effective story. It's all a little sillier but in a tonally consistent way, and being on their own forces the comic relief characters to step up and mature a little bit while still having the ability to pull off a pretty great suppository joke".

Rotten Tomatoes reported that 100% of critics gave the third season a positive review with an average rating of 8.70/10, based on 12 reviews. The website's consensus reads, "Deepening the character depth as well as the stakes, The Legend of Vox Machina's third season solidifies it as a Dungeon Master amongst its animation contemporaries." Anna Govert, reviewing the 12 episode third season for Paste, called it a "much more perilous" season which "sacrifices a majority of its crude humor in favor of heavier plot threads and character arcs" and while it "takes some liberties" as an adaptation, these changes help "the story in the transition to television". Govert highlighted that the third season often pairs characters up in comparison to the "sometimes solitary journeys" characters took before and by having "meaningful moments between the chaos of the season's ticking clock", the show "understands better than most of its peers that the overarching plots and life-threatening dangers are only compelling and terrifying if we care about the people throwing themselves head-first into the fire". Aayush Sharma of GameRant also highlighted the escalating stakes and character work in the third season. Sharma viewed "betrayal and its consequences" as the central theme for the season where "characters who betray others must grapple with the ramifications of their actions, including loss of friendships, personal guilt, and external conflicts". He thought the season balanced the darker narrative aspects with humor, "heartfelt storylines", and romantic relationships and that The Legend of Vox Machina makes "viewers care deeply about the characters' fates". Rafael Motamayor of IGN saw "vengeance and love" as the main themes of the third season with death feeling "significant, poignant, utterly catastrophic, and, most importantly, costly". On the first half of the season, Motamayor thought the writers struggled "to wrangle their many ongoing storylines" while balancing "what happened on the livestreams and the changes made by the animated series" which left it "feeling too contrived and convenient at points". However, Motamayor felt the second half was "exciting" and went "beyond" the original campaign it adapted; he also highlighted the "stunning" animation work, with standout character work and the best fight scenes of the show so far. Harvey Randall of PC Gamer praised the unexpected character deaths as "these changes ensure that long-time fans like me aren't just sat here crossing off entries on a bingo card". Randall commented that the creators "have made a statement that no-one is exactly safe" and "while Percy's death seemed like a brave, interesting departure from the source material, turning a pretty well-loved side character into a Red Dragon pancake is like stabbing a knife through it".

For the fourth season, 100% of critics gave it a positive review with an average rating of 8.40/10, based on 11 reviews.

=== Accolades ===
Year	Award	Category	Nominee(s)	Result	Ref.
2022	Annecy International Animation Film Festival	TV Films in Competition (French: Films de télévision en compétition)	Episode: "The Feast of Realms"	Nominated	
2023	Webby Awards	Video, Animation (Series & Channels)	The Legend of Vox Machina	Honoree	
2024	Annie Awards	Outstanding Achievement for Editorial in an Animated Television / Broadcast Production	Todd Raleigh (for Episode: "The Sunken Tomb")	Nominated	

== Other media ==
- The Legend of Vox Machina is an adaptation of the first campaign of the web series Critical Role. "The first campaign lasted 115 episodes, with each video lasting between three- and six-hours long".
  - The comic series Critical Role: Vox Machina Origins is an adaptation of the group's game before the show.
  - The novel Critical Role: Vox Machina – Kith & Kin (2021) is a prequel adaptation which focuses on backstory of the twins, Vex and Vax, three years before they joined the adventuring party Vox Machina.
  - The campaign sourcebook, Critical Role: Tal'Dorei Campaign Setting (2017), is a guide to the setting of campaign one. It was published by Critical Role and Green Ronin Publishing under the Wizards of the Coast Open Game License and is not considered "official" Dungeons & Dragons material. The book is now out of print — a revised edition, titled Tal'Dorei Campaign Setting Reborn (2022), was released by Darrington Press. The revised edition reflects the twenty year progression of time between campaign one and campaign two.
- The Legend of Vox Machina: The Whitestone Chronicles is an interconnected prequel graphic novel series for The Legend of Vox Machina written by Marieke Nijkamp with art by Tyler Walpole. The series was announced by Dark Horse in February 2023; the first book, The Legend of Vox Machina: The Whitestone Chronicles – Ripley, was released in December 2024. The second volume, The Legend of Vox Machina: The Whitestone Chronicles – Cassandra, was released in March 2026. The third volume, The Legend of Vox Machina: The Whitestone Chronicles – The Briarwoods, is scheduled for release in June 2026.
