= The Mighty Nein =

Fantasy animated series

- Genre: Action; Adventure; Comedy drama; Fantasy
- Created by: Critical Role
- Based on: The Mighty Nein by Critical Role
- Showrunner: Tasha Huo
- Voices of: Laura Bailey; Taliesin Jaffe; Ashley Johnson; Matthew Mercer; Liam O'Brien; Marisha Ray; Sam Riegel; Travis Willingham
- Music by: Neal Acree
- Country of origin: United States
- Original language: English
- No. of seasons: 1
- No. of episodes: 8

Production
- Executive producers: Chris Prynoski; Tasha Huo; Sam Riegel; Travis Willingham; Laura Bailey; Taliesin Jaffe; Ashley Johnson; Matthew Mercer; Liam O'Brien; Marisha Ray; Antonio Canobbio; Ben Kalina; Shannon Prynoski
- Editors: Jeff Dirdack; Clayton Baker
- Running time: 43–49 minutes
- Production companies: Metapigeon; Panda Burrow; Titmouse, Inc.; Amazon MGM Studios

Original release
- Network: Amazon Prime Video
- Release: November 19, 2025 – present

Related
- The Legend of Vox Machina

The Mighty Nein is an American adult animated fantasy television series produced by Metapigeon, Titmouse and Amazon MGM Studios for Amazon Prime Video. The show is based on campaign two of Critical Role and is set 20 years after the events of the previous Critical Role animated series The Legend of Vox Machina. Like its predecessor, The Mighty Nein adapts – rather than recreates – the source material.

The show was announced in January 2023, and work on the project had begun by March 2023. The first season premiered on November 19, 2025 and received positive reviews from critics and audiences. A second season began production in 2025, and is scheduled to premiere in its entirety on March 24, 2027.

== Premise ==
=== Setting ===
The Mighty Nein is set on Exandria, a fictional world created by Matthew Mercer in 2012 for his personal Dungeons & Dragons campaign which later launched as the actual play web series Critical Role in 2015. The story takes place on the continent of Wildemount, which is located to the east of Tal'Dorei, the setting of The Legend of Vox Machina (2022). It takes place 20 years after the events of The Legend of Vox Machina, at a time of very high tensions between the Dwendalian Empire and the Kryn Dynasty—two of Wildemount's major powers, which are divided by the Ashkeeper Peaks mountain range—and war is imminent.

Western Wildemount is governed by the Dwendalian Empire and is ruled by King Bertrand Dwendal. A council of powerful archmages called the Cerberus Assembly act as advisors to the House of Dwendal. Trent Ikithon, Archmage of Civic Influence, controls a secret group of wizard assassins known as the Volstrucker. The Empire regards the region of Xhorhas, which occupies the eastern side of the continent, as an inhospitable wasteland. Xhorhas is governed by the Kryn Dynasty, is ruled by the Bright Queen Leylas Kryn, and is primarily home to the drow and other races considered to be monstrous. The Menagerie Coast occupies the southwestern coastline next to the Lucidian Ocean and is governed by the Clovis Concord, a coalition of city-states that includes Nicodranas and Port Damali.

=== Synopsis ===
The Mighty Nein follows a group of misfits with troubled pasts and secrets who find themselves drawn together by circumstance. They become entangled in a larger conflict and must work together to save the realm after a powerful arcane relic known as The Beacon falls into dangerous hands.

== Cast and characters ==
=== Main ===
The cast reprised their roles from the Critical Role actual play show:

- Laura Bailey as Jester Lavorre, a mischievous tiefling cleric who follows an unseen deity known as "The Traveler"
- Taliesin Jaffe as Mollymauk "Molly" Tealeaf, a flamboyant tiefling blood hunter who works as a tarot card reader in a traveling carnival. In an interview with Paste, Jaffe expressed gratitude that the animated series would give the opportunity to explore Molly's backstory, given the character's death early in the original campaign
- Ashley Johnson as Yasha Nydoorin, an aasimar barbarian from the wastes of Xhorhas within the Kryn Dynasty
- Matthew Mercer as Essek Thelyss, a drow wizard from the Kryn Dynasty who is involved in high level machinations between the Dynasty and the Empire while hiding that his mother has typhros (Note: Typhros is a fictional neurodegenerative disease that affects certain consecuted individuals whose repeated reincarnations leave them unable to integrate the accumulated memories of their prior lives. Individuals with this disease are executed in the Kryn Dynasty.)
- Liam O'Brien as Caleb Widogast, a scruffy human wizard with a command of fire-based magic. Born as Bren Aldric Ermendrud, he underwent training to become a Volstrucker under Trent Ikithon's tutelage at the Soltryce Academy. O'Brien's studies abroad lead to Zemnian – Caleb's mother tongue – being based on a "classic or old version of German"
- Marisha Ray as Beauregard "Beau" Lionett, a human monk from the Cobalt Soul who is skilled in martial arts and investigative work
- Sam Riegel as Nott the Brave, a goblin rogue who is specialized in stealth and crossbow combat but suffers from alcoholism stemming from trying to self-medicate her body dysmorphia. In an interview with Radio Times, Riegel stated that Nott was, in part, created to "reflect the trans experience"
- Travis Willingham as Fjord Stone, a half-orc warlock and sailor who unknowingly gains magical abilities after surviving a shipwreck. Willingham told Paste that Fjord's journey is one of a naive and "more ordinary" person exploring the world for answers having unwittingly obtained mystical powers

Additionally, the main cast voice additional minor characters throughout the series.

=== Supporting ===
- Bennett Abara as Owelia, a halfling Volstrucker
- Lucy Liu as Leylas Kryn, the Bright Queen of the Kryn Dynasty
- Graham McTavish as Bertrand Dwendal, the King of the Dwendalian Empire
- T'Nia Miller as Vess DeRogna, the Archmage of Antiquity for the Cerberus Assembly
- RedChild as Eadwulf Grieve, a Volstrucker and one of Caleb's former romantic partners from their time at the Soltryce Academy
- Ivanna Sakhno as Astrid Becke, a Volstrucker and one of Caleb's former romantic partners from their time at the Soltryce Academy
- Mark Strong as Trent Ikithon, the Archmage of Civil Influence for the Cerberus Assembly to whom the Volstruckers report
- Ming-Na Wen as Dairon, an elf Expositor in the Cobalt Soul who is investigating misconduct connected to both the Cerberus Assembly and the Cobalt Soul
- Anjelica Huston as Deitra Thelyss, Essek's mother who is head of Den Thelyss and secretly suffering from typhros
- Rahul Kohli as Verrat, an orc general in the Kryn Dynasty who has been reincarnated multiple times due to the Luxon Beacon
- Nathan Fillion as "The Gentleman", a water genasi crime boss in Zadash who runs a fencing and smuggling network

== Episodes ==
Season	Episodes	Originally released	
Season	Episodes	First released	Last released
1	8	November 19, 2025	December 22, 2025
2	8	March 24, 2027	

=== Season 1 (2025) ===
No. overall	No. in season	Title	Directed by	Written by	Original release date
1	1	"Mote of Possibility"	Eugene Lee	Teleplay by : Tasha Huo	November 19, 2025 (Note: The first episode was released on November 14, 2025, on YouTube for a limited time ahead of the series premiere date.)
Volstruckers – Astrid, Eadwulf, and Dain – steal a Luxon Beacon. Pursued by Kryn forces, they retreat to Rockguard Garrison where an explosion occurs. The Bright Queen warns King Bertrand to return the Beacon or face war. Archmage Trent Ikithon claims the true culprit is irrelevant now the Queen has a war pretext. Cobalt Soul monks investigate the blast. While her field supervisor blames Kryn savages, trainee Beau discovers a crystal fragment. Later, Archivist Zeenoth confiscates the fragment, chiding her. Beau tails Zeenoth to a meeting with Owelia, a Volstrucker, where he returns the residuum crystal. Owelia ambushes Beau, leaving her for dead. Expositor Dairon rescues Beau and enlists her help investigating corruption within the Cobalt Soul and the Cerberus Assembly. Ikithon secretly meets with his Volstruckers, witnessing the Beacon's soul-absorbing properties when Dain dies. Meanwhile, a destitute Caleb encounters Nott, who agrees to help burglarize a shop in exchange for alcohol. Caleb attempts a cat-summoning ritual that fails, though the cat briefly appears. Originally planning to betray Caleb for money, Nott instead offers to extend their partnership after witnessing the spell. Elsewhere, searching for the Beacon, Yasha attacks Kryn forces; a sigil glows on the back of her neck.
2	2	"Who Will You Be?"	Mari Yang	Teleplay by : Tania Lotia	November 19, 2025
Fjord and Captain Vandran finish sparring before their ship is sabotaged during a storm. An otherworldly voice tells Fjord to "breathe". He wakes washed ashore, finding Vandran's falchion. Beau learns of her first mission as an Expositor. At the Lavish Chateau, Jester converses with an unseen entity called the Traveler while her mother, Marion, performs. The Bright Queen tasks Essek with recovering the Beacon and General Verrat with war preparations. Essek visits Deirta, his mother, who is in hiding with typhros and promises to find a cure. Fjord is refused entry to Nicodranas, but a wave of magic from his sword unintentionally commands the guards to obey him. Beau recalls her fight with Owelia, gaining insight. After hiding in a stable overnight, Caleb and Nott are discovered, freeing Beau's horse as they flee. Jester interrupts Lord Sharpe's pro-war speech. As she flees, she bumps into Fjord who unwittingly aggravates the situation. They escape to the Chateau. Jester and Fjord leave for Zadash to avoid the wrath of Lord Sharpe. Despite the pretence of being banished to a Cobalt Soul outpost, Beau is being watched. Essek teleports to the Soltryce Academy to help Ikithon study the stolen Beacon.
3	3	"The Fletching & Moondrop Traveling Carnival of Curiosities"	Ed Tadem	Teleplay by : Zak Schwartz	November 19, 2025
In Trostenwald, Mollymauk reassures Gustav that Toya and her Devil-Toad act will save the carnival. While waiting for transport to Zadash, Jester and Fjord play carnival games and discuss magical patrons. As Toya's caravan arrives, Nott and Caleb attempt to steal her lumino beetles but Caleb freezes after seeing Owelia in the crowd. Owelia has tracked Beau to the carnival, where Beau receives a message stone from Dairon's contact. Beau confronts Nott and Caleb about her missing horse; Nott pickpockets the stone from Beau. Mollymauk convinces Jester and Fjord to see Toya's act. Inside the big tent, Toya uses her beetles and voice to direct the Devil-Toad through tricks, with Jester volunteering onstage. Outside, another attempt by Nott and Caleb to steal the beetles leads to a scuffle with Beau; beetles escape into the tent. Toya loses control of the toad, which rampages and transforms people into monstrous thralls, including Gustav. Everyone fights – Mollymauk is forced to kill Gustav in self-defense. The toad swallows the stone when attempting to eat Beau. Caleb loses control of a spell after Fjord bumps him, igniting the tent. The toad grabs Toya and escapes. Guards arrive and arrest the survivors.
4	4	"The Mighty Nein"	Micah Gunnell	Teleplay by : Sam Riegel & Travis Willingham	November 26, 2025
The survivors of the carnival massacre are blamed for the attack and thrown in jail. In order to clear their names, they break out and return to the carnival to investigate the attack. Molly uses a mysterious blood magic ability to track the Devil-Toad. They find the toad in a cave, where the monster has possessed Toya, claiming it is all that keeps her alive. The team fight and kill the toad, slicing Toya free, but Nott and Jester are unable to save her. Beau retrieves her stone and Molly discovers a dimensional rift that looks familiar, but he does not understand why. Devastated by the loss of Toya and their role in it, the group start traveling together. A misunderstanding at Trostenwald's gates leads Jester to declare to guards that the group is called "The Mighty Nein". When they return the toad's head, they are ambushed by Owelia, who recognizes Caleb. Meanwhile, Essek helps Trent Ikithon access and experiment on the Beacon, but is quickly disturbed by Ikithon's brutal tactics and intent to use the Beacon as a weapon. Verrat discovers Deirta has typhros, but vows to keep Essek's secret as he is deployed for war.
5	5	"Little Spark"	DWooman	Teleplay by : Marque Franklin-Williams	December 3, 2025
The Mighty Nein fight and apprehend Owelia, who poisons Fjord and breaks Caleb's amulet, exposing him to arcane spying. The group travel to a cabin, where Nott works to cure Fjord while Beau and Caleb interrogate Owelia. Owelia uses Beau's distrust of Caleb to sow discord between them, revealing that Caleb is a former Volstrucker. When Owelia uses the distraction to escape, Caleb pursues her alone and burns her to death as he breaks down in tears. In a final act, Owelia sends a message with Caleb's old name, Bren, on it. Caleb agrees to tell the Nein his story. In interspersed flashbacks, we see how Trent Ikithon took an interest in a young Bren, accepting him into the Soltryce Academy with Astrid and Eadwulf, both of whom Bren formed a romantic polyamorous relationship with. The three are indoctrinated by Ikithon as they are trained to be Volstruckers, killing those who oppose the empire without remorse. One day, Bren is tasked with killing rebels in his hometown, including his parents. After burning his childhood home with them and his cat still inside, Bren breaks due to the psychological trauma, burning Astrid and Eadwulf in the process.
6	6	"Many Gifts"	Mari Yang	Teleplay by : Zak Schwartz	December 10, 2025
The Mighty Nein arrive in Zadash. Beau gives the message stone implicating Ikithon to Dairon, who warns her against trusting Caleb. Astrid magically spies on Caleb, having received Owelia's message. The party meets an underworld boss – the Gentleman – who agrees to replace Caleb's concealment amulet, provided they steal an arcane compass from an ancient treasure horde. Before the meeting, the Gentleman's tabaxi assistant, Cree, greets Mollymauk as 'Lucien'—to his and the group's confusion. Infiltrating the ruins, the group struggles to trust one another. Fjord's magical patron has him retrieve an eye-shaped crystal from an underwater trove. After a tense standoff between Caleb and Beau, the Mighty Nein escape both the Dwendalian soldiers and the massive metal guardians protecting the treasure, begrudgingly starting to trust each other. Meanwhile, Curator Tasha of the Cobalt Soul arrests Ikithon for treason, but he convinces Bertrand to allow him to use the Beacon against the Kryn. Discovering this, Essek saves Verrat before Ikithon uses the Beacon to kill Verrat's men. Verrat realizes that Essek helped steal the Beacon. Yasha slaughters her way into the Empire, commanded by visions of a mysterious dark elf through a sigil on her neck, until finally arriving in Zadash.
7	7	"Belonging"	Ed Tadem	Teleplay by : Tania Lotia	December 17, 2025
Tasha is executed for Ikithon's arrest. The Mighty Nein collects Caleb's new amulet from the Gentleman, who offers a job to steal the Beacon. Uncertain, the group splits. Dairon advises Beau to lie low. Caleb abandons Nott to seek revenge against Ikithon. Astrid and Eadwulf intercept him, then spare his life and urge him to flee. Fjord leaves Jester, who becomes frustrated that her prayers to the Traveler go unanswered. She encounters a drunken Nott, and they vandalize a Dawnfather temple to unsuccessfully call the Traveler. Molly follows Cree to a blood-soaked shrine in his image marked with red eyes. Fjord communes with his menacing patron. Caleb reunites with Nott and suggests leaving the Empire, but Nott instead proposes stealing the Beacon with the rejoined Mighty Nein. After Verrat threatens to expose Essek's betrayal, Deirta confesses to having Typhros and is executed by the Bright Queen, who shows signs of Typhros herself. Devastated, Essek frames Verrat for the betrayal. The Queen executes Verrat and orders Essek to recover the Beacon. The Gentleman gives the compass to Vess DeRogna, who commissioned him to steal the Beacon. After speaking arcane words to a book, DeRogna develops red eyes identical to Molly's.
8	8	"The Zadash Job"	Micah Gunnell	Teleplay by : Tasha Huo	December 22, 2025
In a flashback, it is revealed that Yasha was widowed before falling under the control of her current patron. The Mighty Nein accept the Gentleman's job to steal the Beacon, which will be on display at a gala at the Soltryce Academy. At the gala, Beau and Fjord distract Ikithon and the Volstruckers. Simultaneously, Jester – with the Traveler's help – sets off fireworks, prompting Ikithon return the Beacon to its tower. DeRogna recognizes Mollymauk as 'Lucien', claiming that she killed him and became the new 'Nonagon'. She tries to kill him again, but Mollymauk's eye tattoos activate, overpowering her. Nott and Caleb infiltrate the tower but are discovered by Ikithon, who nearly convinces Caleb to join him. Kryn agents then storm the tower, escaping with the Beacon; Ikithon manages to subdue one of the agents, who is revealed to be Essek. The Nein flee into the sewers, where they encounter the escaping Kryn agents. Fjord absorbs the eye-shaped crystal into his body, empowering him to kill one of the Kryn. The final Kryn is beheaded by Yasha. The Beacon shocks her when she picks it up, disabling her sigil—she then begs the Nein for help.

=== Season 2 ===
No. overall	No. in season	Title	Directed by	Written by	Original release date
9	1	TBA	TBA	Teleplay by : Tasha Huo & K.J. Shabel	March 24, 2027
10	2	TBA	TBA	Teleplay by : Tasha Huo & Zak Schwartz	March 24, 2027
11	3	TBA	TBA	Teleplay by : Tasha Huo & Zak Schwartz	March 24, 2027
12	4	TBA	TBA	Teleplay by : Nneka Gerstle	March 24, 2027
13	5	TBA	TBA	Teleplay by : Shakira Pressley	March 24, 2027
14	6	TBA	TBA	Teleplay by : Zak Schwartz	March 24, 2027
15	7	TBA	TBA	Teleplay by : Sam Riegel & Travis Willingham	March 24, 2027
16	8	TBA	TBA	Teleplay by : Tasha Huo	March 24, 2027

== Development ==
=== Background ===
The Mighty Nein is an adaptation of the second campaign of the actual play web series Critical Role. As part of a sponsorship deal between Critical Role and D&D Beyond in 2018, an animated ad spot for the platform was produced which featured the Mighty Nein characters in combat. The animated ad "opened doors" for The Legend of Vox Machina (2022), the first Critical Role animation adaptation, to be produced. In January 2023, it was announced that Critical Role Productions had signed a first-look deal with Amazon Studios to create film and television series, while also announcing an animated series based on the Mighty Nein campaign. Variety reported that "under the deal with Amazon Studios, Critical Role will continue to produce under its production banner, Metapigeon".

=== Casting ===
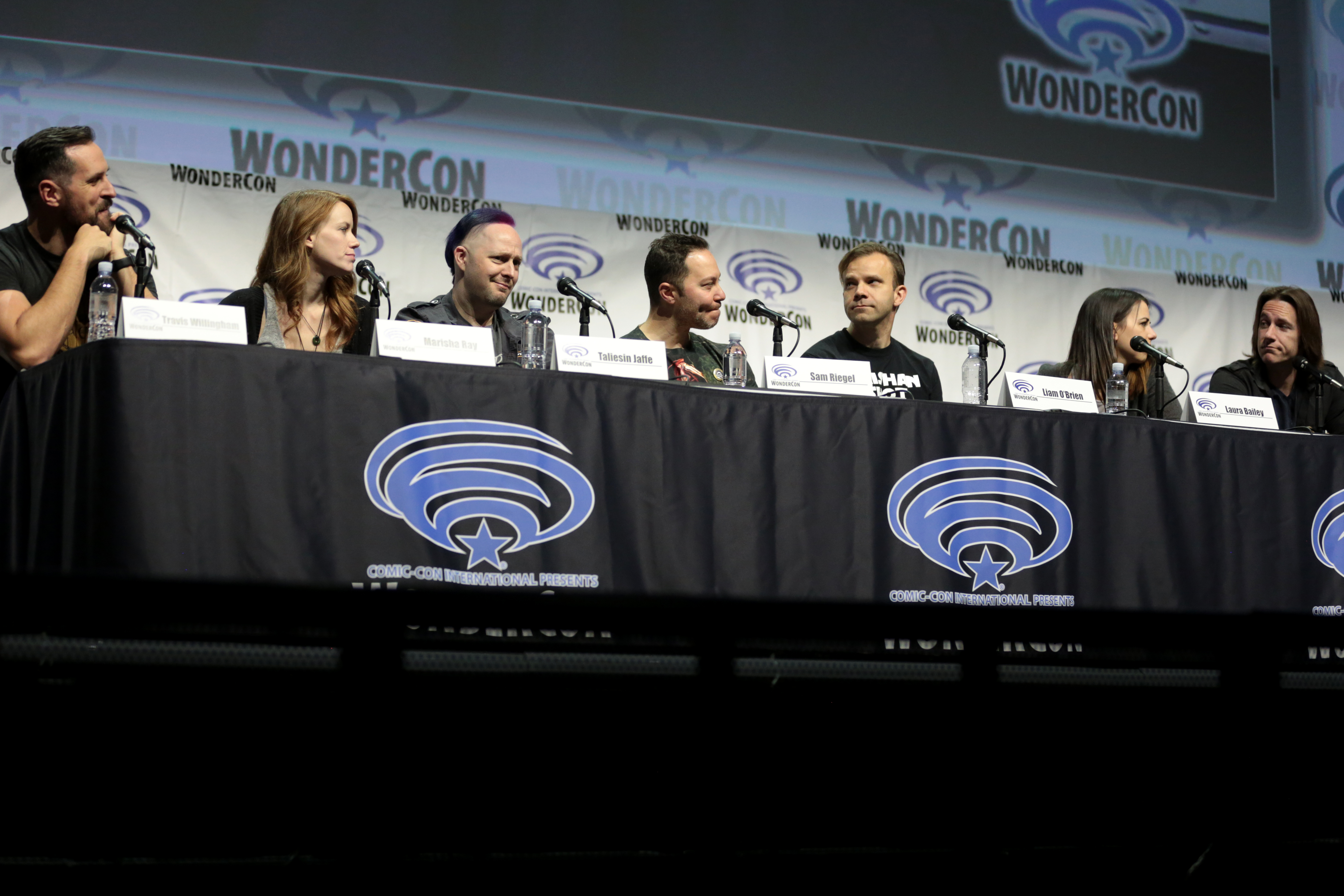
The main cast of Critical Role at WonderCon in 2017.

The Critical Role player cast reprise their roles from the second campaign. On July 22, 2025, it was reported that Matthew Mercer, Critical Role's dungeon master, would reprise his role as Essek Thelyss. Entertainment Weekly noted that "the 'Hidden Matt Mercer' trend definitely continues on The Mighty Nein, i.e. Critical Role's Dungeon Master voicing various background roles on the show, as he did on The Legend of Vox Machina". Additionally, the other main cast members, "as well as the extended Critical Role family, play their part in voicing various one-off characters".

On July 24, 2025, it was announced that Auliʻi Cravalho, Alan Cumming, Robbie Daymond, Jonathan Frakes, Rahul Kohli, Tim McGraw, Anika Noni Rose, Mark Strong, and Ming-Na Wen would be guest voice actors. On October 9, 2025, Felicia Day, Nathan Fillion, Anjelica Huston, Lucy Liu, Graham McTavish, T'Nia Miller, and Ivanna Sakhno were announced as additional guest voice actors.

=== Production ===
Along side Chris Prynoski, Tasha Huo, Antonio Canobbio, Ben Kalina and Shannon Prynoski, the starring cast are executive producers for the show.

In early March 2023, Critical Role cast member Liam O'Brien stated to ComicBook.com that work on The Mighty Nein project had begun. Voice acting had begun by June 8, 2024, according to a post on X. In an October 2024 interview, cast member and executive producer Travis Willingham stated that the writing for the first season was completed and that progress on the show was "definitely more than halfway done". In June 2025, Willingham stated that they had "recorded the entire first and second season".

The cast were involved in the character design process. Cast member and executive producer Sam Riegel commented that The Mighty Nein will be "tonally different" from their first animated adaptation The Legend of Vox Machina. Showrunner and executive producer Tasha Huo similarly stated that the Mighty Nein "reflects a more mature, more elevated storytelling" than the previous series and this show has "more drama" and "more filmmaking involved". Huo noted that they tried "to treat the show like a live-action show, which is tonally different than Vox Machina, but still keeping within the same world". Willingham explained that this adaptation "is from the get-go a complete departure" and that "you're coming into the characters that you love, but a totally new story". Among the changes are the deaths of characters who survived in the original campaign, a deliberate decision by the creators to establish a darker tone for the series. In an October 2025 interview with Polygon, Willingham explained that The Mighty Nein would be slower paced than the first two seasons of The Legend of Vox Machina – comparing the approach to the new show to "starting from a session zero perspective."

Entertainment Weekly highlighted that The Mighty Nein will take a similar approach to the character Essek Thelyss as The Legend of Vox Machina series did with its "more nefarious characters", such as the Briarwoods, by "showing story material that happened 'off screen' (metaphorically speaking, since there are no screens in a table-top campaign)". Willingham commented that this approach will show the audience "the machinations both happening in the Empire and the Dynasty, all the things moving behind the scenes, and really who was Essek" and how he ended up "in the place where he was, moving these large pieces and affecting a large portion of the world in The Mighty Nein".

In a December 2025 interview with Screen Rant, Riegel stated that post-production on the second season was in progress and "one or two episodes" were completed. He hoped that the season would premiere in 2026. In November 2026, it was announced that the second season is scheduled to premiere on March 24, 2027.

=== Animation ===
The series is animated by Titmouse, Inc. Huo emphasized the appearance of spellcasting is unique for each character, reflecting "who they are as people". Dunamancy, a type of magic created by Mercer for the Kryn Dynasty, is also featured. In comparison to The Legend of Vox Machina, Riegel noted that magic is more "intricate", highlighting that the components and incantations used "to make magic" as well as "the way that people learn magic or are granted magic is a big, big deal in The Mighty Nein". At the SCAD AnimationFest, art director Joseph Martinez explained that while the first series is "a bit more high fantasy", the setting for The Mighty Nein "is more grounded and based on Eastern European history. We went for a more brutalist look, with architecture that over encumbers our characters". The art design used deliberate "color cues" to signal "unspoken political tensions" and the characters' "state of mind".

== Broadcast ==
The series is streamed on Amazon Prime Video. The first season premiered on November 19, 2025. The season premiered with three episodes, followed by one per week for eight episodes total. As a preview, Amazon offered free early access to the first episode on YouTube from November 14–16, 2025.

== Marketing ==
During 2024 San Diego Comic-Con (SDCC), Amazon Studios released the first sneak peek of series with a voiced animatic showing Jester and Fjord meeting for the first time. At the next SDCC in 2025, character art and a clip from the first season was released along with the premiere date announcement. Polygon highlighted that the group is called the Mighty Nein "despite there not being nine" adventurers in the group and the SDCC panel clip "riffs that there are, in fact, only seven of them". A sneak peek of season 2 was unveiled at Annecy Festival on June 24 2026.

== Reception ==
The series holds a 100% approval rating on review aggregator Rotten Tomatoes, based on 22 critic reviews. The website's critics consensus reads, "The Mighty Nein is a terrific continuation of Critical Role with a highly engaging and expansive franchise that gives D&D fans rich characters to root for." Metacritic, which uses a weighted average, assigned the season a score of 80 out of 100 based on 7 critics, indicating "generally favorable reviews".

=== Awards and nominations ===
Awards and nominations
Date	Award	Category	Recipient(s)	Result	Ref.
2026	Primetime Emmy Award	Outstanding Individual Achievement in Animation	Howard Chen, Background Design (Episode: "Mote of Possibility")	Won	
2026	Gayming Awards	Queer Geek Entertainment of the Year Award	The Mighty Nein	Nominated	
