= Tomb Raider: The Legend of Lara Croft =

2024 animated television series

- Release poster
- Genre: Action-adventure
- Based on: Tomb Raider by Crystal Dynamics
- Developed by: Tasha Huo
- Showrunner: Tasha Huo
- Voices of: Hayley Atwell; Allen Maldonado; Earl Baylon; Karen Fukuhara; O-T Fagbenle
- Music by: Pinar Toprak & Gerrit Wunder
- Country of origin: United States
- Original language: English
- No. of seasons: 2
- No. of episodes: 16

Production
- Executive producers: Dallas Dickinson; Noah Hughes; Brad Graeber; Jen Chambers; Dmitri M. Johnson; Mike Goldberg; Howard Bliss; Timothy I. Stevenson; Jacob Robinson; Tasha Huo
- Editors: David Howe; Justin Howe; Mohit Jaswal; Stefan Gill
- Running time: 24–35 minutes
- Production companies: Crystal Dynamics; Story Kitchen (Note: Known as dj2 Entertainment for season 1); Netflix Animation Studios; Powerhouse Animation Studios; Panda Burrow; Legendary Television

Original release
- Network: Netflix
- Release: October 10, 2024 – December 11, 2025

Tomb Raider: The Legend of Lara Croft is an American adult animated action-adventure television series based on the Tomb Raider video game series by Crystal Dynamics, starring Hayley Atwell as the voice of Lara Croft. Tasha Huo serves as showrunner with Legendary Television and Story Kitchen producing, while animation services are provided by Powerhouse Animation Studios.

The series is set in the same continuity as the Survivor trilogy that started in 2013, and takes place after the events of the 2018 game Shadow of the Tomb Raider. The first season premiered on Netflix on October 10, 2024, and the second and final season premiered on December 11, 2025.

== Premise ==
The series takes place after the Tomb Raider Survivor trilogy, which concluded with Shadow of the Tomb Raider, and fills in the gap in the timeline, bridging the reboot trilogy to the original series of games.

== Voice cast and characters ==
=== Main ===
- Hayley Atwell as Lara Croft, a young British woman who searches caves and tombs for artifacts
  - Maggie Lowe voices a young Lara
- Allen Maldonado as Zip, Lara's friend and a tech expert
- Earl Baylon as Jonah Maiava, Lara's cheerful friend who previously joined her in several expeditions
- Karen Fukuhara as Sam Nishimura (season 2; guest season 1), Lara's closest friend and an investigative reporter
- O-T Fagbenle as Eshu (season 2), also known as Papa Legba, the trickster Orisha and the Lwa of crossroads who befriends Lara and Sam

=== Recurring ===
- Richard Armitage as Charles Devereaux (season 1), a mercenary who aims to defeat a mysterious group known as "The Light" using the combined power of the peril stones
- Nolan North as Conrad Roth (season 1), Lara's deceased mentor
- Zoe Boyle as Camilla Roth, Lara's childhood friend, Conrad's daughter, and an INTERPOL agent
- Roxana Ortega as Abigaile "Abby" Ortiz, Jonah's fiancée and a talented mechanic
- Tricia Helfer as Mila (season 2), the leader of PITHOS, a utopian organization, who believes that she can save the world by harnessing the powers granted by the Orisha spirit masks
- Marisha Ray as Fig (season 2), Mila's right-hand woman and a skilled combatant
- J.B. Blanc as Kane (season 2), one of Mila's top enforcers

=== Guest ===
- Mara Junot as Joslin Reyes (season 1), a friend of Lara, Jonah, and Sam
- Ming-Na Wen as Eva Tong, a curator who repatriates repaired or stolen artifacts in Beijing
- Rachel Rosenbloom as Elvan Kaya (season 1), a Turkish mobster in Istanbul
- Jonathan Roumie as Winston (season 1), the Croft family butler
- Stan Walker as Leo (season 1), Jonah's old military friend
- Xanthe Huynh as Daji (season 1), a mysterious fox spirit
- Ben Prendergast as Richard Croft (season 1), Lara's deceased father
- Ike Amadi as Oko (season 2), the Orisha of harvest and the previous holder of an Orisha mask in Colombia
- Yetide Badaki as Yemeja (season 2), the Orisha of water and the holder of an Orisha mask in Brazil
- Matt Mercer as Chartreuse (season 2), the proprietor of a voodoo museum in New Orleans
- Toks Olagundoye and Erica Luttrell as Taiwo and Kehinde (season 2), the twin Orisha of healing and the holders of two Orisha masks in Scotland
  - Olagundoye also voices Penelope Stone (season 2), Lara's former friend, who has since turned against her
- Helen Sadler as Caitrín (season 2), an employee who works at the Gemini Pub in Scotland and an acquaintance of Taiwo
- Elijah St. John as Babaluaye (season 2), the Orisha of disease and the holder of an Orisha mask in Cuba
- Alejandra Reynoso as Rosalita (season 2), Babaluaye's wife
- Logan Alacron-Poucel as Idariji (season 2), Babaluaye's son
- Sean Rohani as The Hawk (season 2), a black market collector acquainted with Lara
- Gabe Kunda as Olodumare (season 2), the father of the Orisha and the supreme being of the Yoruba religion

== Episodes ==
Season	Episodes	Originally released
1	8	October 10, 2024
2	8	December 11, 2025

=== Season 1 (2024) ===
No. overall	No. in season	Title	Directed by	Written by	Original release date
1	1	"A Single Step"	Cassie Urban	Tasha Huo	October 10, 2024
Lara Croft goes to an ancient ruin in Chile with Conrad Roth, and they find an ancient artifact box. Lara warns him not to take it, but he does anyway, and they both fight off those who tell them about the artifact's dangerous properties. Three years later, after the flashback, Lara returns from Peru and, with the help of her friends Zip and Jonah, plans to sell all the possessions in her family's manor. She continues to have flashbacks to Roth's death, which Joslin Reyes blames her for, while Sam Nishimura stays at her side. However, she leaves before giving a speech at the auction to sell off the possessions. In the process, she encounters a masked assailant who steals the artifact box. While she attempts to track them down with Zip's help, they escape and remove their masks, revealing themselves to be Charles Devereaux. Later, he opens the box, its power consumes him, and he plans to get its counterpart in China. Lara plans to go after him and stop his evil deeds before it is too late, using her father's diary as a guide.
2	2	"A Set of Lies Agreed Upon"	Giselle "Faragon" R.	Tasha Huo	October 10, 2024
Lara travels to China in search of the ancient ruins of Tianxi Xing along with Jonah, who helps her obtain a guide to the shrine, Yining. At the same time, Devereaux and a guide are in the same forest, also looking for the shrine. Lara later descends into a hole to find missing children, and Jonah follows her. They face a mysterious fox spirit and barely escape. Lara realizes that the boxes are not what Devereaux is after, but rather what is inside. She grabs the ruby box, but the ruby stone is not inside. Not long after, she finds the children and releases a spirit after hacking at its coffin, allowing them to escape. She asks the fox spirit, Daji, to save them, and she obliges, later bowing to Lara, as they all can escape. Jonah urges Lara to let this go and stop going on this quest. The episode ends with a tidal wave about to overtake her boat.
3	3	"Living Midnight"	Cassie Urban	Tasha Huo	October 10, 2024
Lara becomes separated from Jonah and is almost drowned in the turbulent waters. She somehow survives but believes that Jonah is dead. Not long after, she fights with Devereaux, throwing him the ruby box. She tells Zip that Jonah is dead. Now in Beijing, Lara calls Sam, but her call is interrupted when Zip shows up, who wants to help her. They enter the storeroom of an international guild that restores, repairs, and repatriates artifacts. She gives them a dagger so she can get information on the peril stones. Lara heads to Istanbul to find one of the stones, learns that a mobster named Elvan Kaya has it, and meets Devereaux again, who claims to be a misunderstood hero. Some time later, she breaks into Kaya's compound in an attempt to take one of the stones. She gets the stone, but it takes control of her, causing her to kill people in a gruesome manner. Lara traps the stone, and Kaya tells her to get the stone away from her, declaring that the stone will curse her. Jonah reappears, now controlled/allied with Devereaux, and steals the stone from her, while Devereaux merges the two stones.
4	4	"Big Lies, Small Secrets"	Giselle "Faragon" R.	Tasha Huo and Troy Dangerfield	October 10, 2024
Zip wakes up Lara, who remembers that Devereaux combined the stones. Lara implies that she wants to go on the quest to stop Devereaux alone, and Zip objects. She travels to Paris and arrives at Camilla Roth's apartment. Zip tells her about the stone lockbox. Camilla is surprised to see Lara there, but tells her all she knows about the "Light." Lara convinces Camilla to go to the church of Devereaux's father, as part of a little adventure. Both begin bonding again after she loses connection with Zip when she travels too far underground into the catacombs. They later separate, with Lara claiming they will cover more ground, while Camilla believes Lara is just like her father. Lara learns that the Knights Templar who survive became the "Light." A monster attacks her and has her hallucinate the horrors from her past, until she is brought out of it, thanks to Camila. They have a heartfelt embrace. In Iran, Devereaux follows a mind-controlled Jonah forward.
5	5	"Whanaungatanga" (Note: The Māori concept for the "centrality of relationships")	Cassie Urban	Shakira Pressley	October 10, 2024
Lara meets a man named "Captain" (also known as Leo), whom she met five years before in Oahu. Leo flies the airplane as he drops out a crate. She thanks him for the ride and jumps out of the airplane. She reaches the ground and rides a motorcycle dropped from the airplane to catch the train, where Devereaux and mind-controlled Jonah are. Following this, she rides her motorcycle as the town crumbles around her and makes her way onto the train. She finds that everyone there is under the control of one of the stones. She comes across Devereaux, who says it is not right to destroy everything, but he declares he will do whatever it takes to stop the Light. Jonah attacks her, but she survives and saves him, while everyone else on the train is mind-controlled. Later on, they meet back at Lara's family mansion to read more books. She figures out that Devereaux talked about the Battle of Zhuolu, not "Zulu." Camilla notes that the leaders of the Light are about to make a "glorious return."
6	6	"The Spirit Way"	Giselle "Faragon" R.	Shakira Pressley	October 10, 2024
Lara travels with Jonah through a rainforest before they can reach the ancient battle site. When they arrive, they realize that a local business has recently remade it into a theme park. She learns from one of the guides that no one knows where the battle occurred. She reluctantly watches a film at the site at Jonah's urging and learns the location of the final stone. They later fly to the possible site where the stone is being held, with Jonah saying the ghosts of Roth and her dad are haunting her. They discover ancient ruins and activate a magical process that transports them to Mongolia. Lara makes her way across part of the desert to another ruin, is injured in the process, but finds a temple. Lara warns Devereaux not to combine all four stones, but he does so, and he throws her off a cliff. Injured, she barely makes her way up the cliff, thinking of Camilla's words, but collapses. Two mysterious people save her and Jonah.
7	7	"Yinyang"	Cassie Urban	Tasha Huo	October 10, 2024
Lara thinks back to moments of loss in her life, from the death of Roth and her dad, and Camilla leaving. She even thinks that Devereaux is choking her, but she pulls out of this by the fox spirit Daji, believing that she is not strong enough. Lara asks for Jonah's help, and Jonah accepts after she apologizes. Lara and Jonah visit an old marine research lab. They find Camilla there with some agents, who tell them about the Light's plans there. Devereaux prepares to execute the members of the Light; Lara, Jonah, Camilla, and her fellow agents bust in. Lara fights Devereaux, who transforms into a new body after he ingests all the stones, and he corners her. Lara and Camilla cut down the monster. Lara then begins to attack Camilla under the Wrath Stone's influence, but she resists and electrocutes Devereaux. Camilla's colleagues then take him into custody. Lara goes off to Kunlun Mountain with Jonah.
8	8	"A Journey of a Thousand Miles"	Giselle "Faragon" R.	Tasha Huo	October 10, 2024
Lara and Jonah make their way to Kunlun Mountain. She makes her way to an underwater cavern, and Jonah joins her, with both amazed by what they find, as they journey to Nu'wa. They enter a cave, and Lara is initially unsure how to proceed through the initial section. Jonah barely makes it across a bridge with his life. Lara tries to figure out which objects to use to restore the world's balance and connect all the elements. Lara goes to restore the world's balance. She enters another dimension and enters a floating temple, and the spirit-god combines all the stones. Following this, she wakes up, and Jonah is grateful she saved the world. They fight a Tyrannosaurus, defeat it, and barely escape. Lara attends the wedding of Jonah and Abby. During the wedding party, she receives a distress phone call from Sam. Lara finds signs of a struggle at Sam's home and resolves to find her.

=== Season 2 (2025) ===
No. overall	No. in season	Title	Directed by	Written by	Original release date
9	1	"No Good Deed"	Willis Bulliner; Cassie Urban	Tasha Huo	December 11, 2025
Lara infiltrates a tomb in Russia's Caucasus, rescues Sam, who has been kidnapped, and dispatches the perpetrators with the help of a mysterious woman named Fig, who works for PITHOS, an organization led by Mila. As Lara and Sam meet Mila, Lara is skeptical of PITHOS' motives to save the world; Mila wants Lara to retrieve an ancient Orisha mask, the Mask of Oko. Later, during her research on the Mask of Oko, Lara learns that her father discovered it before it was donated to the British Museum. When she fails to reacquire the mask, Lara secretly breaks into the museum and steals it. After returning the Mask of Oko to Mila, Lara, still suspicious, follows Mila to the Colombian village. When Mila dons the mask that grants her the power to manipulate the earth, Lara is horrified to see chaos and destruction in the village.
10	2	"Festa de Iemanja" (Note: Portuguese for the "Yemeja Festival")	Giselle "Faragon" R.	Shakira Pressley	December 11, 2025
Following the village's destruction caused by Mila, Lara finds out that Fig is heading for Brazil and calls Sam what happened. Afterward, she and Sam head to the abandoned church and discover a hidden room that leads them to the Orisha guardian statues. Fig ambushes them, but the scuffle is interrupted by the police. While Fig escapes, Lara and Sam are arrested, but the taxi driver convinces the officers to let them go. Lara and Sam learn that the Mask of Yemeja is part of the festival, but Fig secretly swaps it for a fake one. Lara chases Fig through the streets and manages to get the mask from her, but gets distracted and loses it again when Fig endangers a child. Fig makes a getaway, but a giant wave stops her from escaping. The taxi driver tells Lara she is Yemeja and reveals that she has kept her real mask with her. Lara receives a vision of the origin of the Orisha masks. Elsewhere, a drunken man expects visitors.
11	3	"Crossroads"	Willis Bulliner; Cassie Urban	Tasha Huo	December 11, 2025
Based on Lara's vision of the Orisha masks' origin, Lara and Sam head to New Orleans. During the voodoo museum tour, they learn the story of a colonial slave ship carrying African treasures that was destroyed by a huge creature off the coast, and about Papa Legba/Eshu, an Orisha known as the mediator between life and death. Lara confronts a drunken man who's been following them with a symbol on his chest from her vision. He claims to know they are treasure hunters and tells her where to find the ship, as described in the mystic's tale. Lara investigates in her scuba gear and finds the shipwreck, which contains two Orisha masks, but she is intercepted by Fig. A fight ensues with a massive shark, and Lara and Fig each escape with one mask. Back at the hotel, the drunken man from earlier identifies the two masks to his twin sisters, Taiwo and Kehinde, before revealing himself as the Orisha Eshu.
12	4	"Slán Abhaile" (Note: An Irish phrase meaning "safe journey home")	Giselle "Faragon" R.	Shakira Pressley	December 11, 2025
Lara, Sam, and Eshu travel to Scotland to find Taiwo. At the pub, they encounter Caitrín, a close acquaintance of Taiwo, who takes them to a secluded cottage. There, they meet Taiwo, who is not happy to see Eshu. While informing Taiwo of Oku's death, Lara and Sam warn Taiwo that her twin sister, Kehinde, is likely next since Mila now has possession of her mask. Taiwo is reluctant at first, but agrees to help them find her. The crew travels to a Viking fort on a remote island in the North Atlantic Ocean, where Kehinde lives in seclusion. While the twins are reuniting, Lara and the other are attacked by Mila along with Fig and PITHOS mercenaries. Mila kills Kehinde and absorbs her power. Lara shoots Mila through the torso, but Mila heals herself and flees. The crew returns to Scotland and attends Kehinde's funeral. Sam encourages Lara to attend the PITHOS masquerade ball to uncover more about Mila's plans.
13	5	"Croft's 6"	Willis Bulliner; Cassie Urban	Tasha Huo	December 11, 2025
Lara and her friends attend the PITHOS masquerade ball and execute Zip's plan to infiltrate the facility and gain access to Mila's office, but they can't find the masks. Eshu begins to sense his brother Ogun's presence, leading him and Lara to discover a secret room beneath the office. A distraught Eshu finds Ogun's mask broken into pieces, revealing to Lara that Ogun killed himself to prevent Mila from taking his mask. Lara learns that Mila first learned about the masks and their powers from Ogun. Meanwhile, Sam spies on Mila, but is caught by Fig. Alerted, Mila locks down the facility, forcing Lara and the others to escape by parachuting from the roof. Lara finds herself trapped by Mila and her mercenaries, but manages to make a daring escape in a stolen helicopter piloted by Jonah. Sam informs Lara that she overheard Mila planning to head for Cuba.
14	6	"The One Who Kills and Is Thanked for It"	Giselle "Faragon" R.	Tasha Huo	December 11, 2025
Lara, Sam, and Eshu arrive in Cuba at the home of Eshu's brother Babaluaye, who's found living a quiet family life. When they warn him about Mila, Babaluaye informs them that his mask, which grants powers of death and disease, is in an underwater temple, and Lara and Sam go to recover it. After they retrieve the mask, Mila and her mercenaries arrive and have taken Babaluaye's wife and son hostage. Babaluaye, using his mask, fights Mila. Meanwhile, Lara and Sam fight off the mercenaries and rescue Babaluaye's family. As the fight turns in Mila's favor, Babaluaye attempts to kill himself to destroy his mask, but Mila uses the power of her healing mask to prevent his death, giving her enough time to steal the mask and absorb his powers. She then kills him and flees, leaving the crew unsure of their next move.
15	7	"The Breaking of the Land"	Willis Bulliner; Cassie Urban	Nneka Gerstle	December 11, 2025
After Babaluaye's funeral, Eshu reveals his mask is in the Lost City, his former home in Nigeria. Lara, Sam, and Eshu arrive at a nearby village where the villagers warmly greet them. That night, Zip informs Lara that disasters have begun all around the world, suspected to be caused by Mila. Lara, Sam, and Eshu head into the Lost City, where Eshu's memory is sparked of the night his village was attacked by British soldiers during an Eyo festival and remembers his mask was stolen during the attack. This leads them to Mehrak Darvish, better known as The Hawk, a black market collector in Morocco. But during Lara and Mehrak's conversation, Eshu smashes the display cases, enraged by the theft of all the items. After reassuring Eshu about the stolen artifacts, Lara and Sam use what they learned from Mehrak to find Eshu's mask. Later, Eshu encounters an Eyo festival and is invigorated to see that people still believe in him, as Lara returns his mask to him.
16	8	"The Bringer of Death"	Giselle "Faragon" R.	Tasha Huo	December 11, 2025
Eshu puts on his mask and regains his powers. After Eshu teleports Lara and Sam to the Lost City, they discuss his abilities. Knowing Fig was spying on them in Morocco, they know Mila will come for them and devise a plan to take a stand, along with the villagers. As Mila and her mercenaries arrive, Eshu seemingly retreats. Mila attempts to kill Lara, but Eshu brings Yemeja and Taiwo, saving Lara. Along with Lara and Sam, they devise a plan to remove the masks from Mila, attacking her and her mercenaries using their mask powers. During the fight against Mila, Eshu manages to take the masks away from Mila before killing her. After the celebration of their victory, Eshu gives Lara and Sam a warm goodbye before teleporting the women back to Croft Manor. Sometime later, Lara gives away the rest of her father's artifacts, and Zip leaves to visit Africa. Eshu brings the masks of his fallen siblings to his father, Olodumare. Elsewhere, Fig, having survived, meets up with Penelope Stone, Lara's former schoolmate who holds a strong hatred for her.

== Production ==
=== Development ===
In January 2021, it was reported that Netflix had ordered an anime-style television series based on Tomb Raider. The series order is for two seasons and was produced by Crystal Dynamics, Legendary Television, dj2 Entertainment and Tractorpants. The series was animated by Powerhouse Animation Studios and additional animation by Korea's Red Dog Animation. Tasha Huo served as showrunner and executive produced alongside Dmitri M. Johnson, Timothy I. Stevenson, Howard Bliss and Jacob Robinson. The writers' room broke in May 2021.

On October 25, 2024, Netflix renewed the series for a second season. Upon the second season renewal, it was stated that the second season will advance Lara's character, covering the topic of "a trail of stolen African Orisha masks" and will join forces with Sam, her best friend, along with possible punching of a shark, with Huo noting that the season will focus on building Lara's team. It was further stated that Huo, Johnson, Robinson, Dickinson, Hughes, Bliss, Chambers, and Hughes will remain as executive producers, while Mike Goldberg joins for the second season, and Huo continues to serve as the series writer and showrunner. In September 2025, the second season was confirmed as the final season of the series.

=== Casting ===
In September 2021, it was announced that Hayley Atwell would voice Lara Croft. Earl Baylon reprised his role as Jonah Maiava from the video game reboot trilogy. In October 2021, Allen Maldonado joined the cast as Lara's tech expert, Zip, a character who was first introduced in the 2000 game Tomb Raider: Chronicles, and had not appeared in the franchise since the 2008 game Tomb Raider: Underworld. The series also marks his first appearance in the reboot continuity. Before the series premiered, Maldonado first voiced the character for the 2022 attraction Tomb Raider: The Live Experience in Camden Market.

=== Characters and themes ===
Following the release of the first season, Matt Patches interviewed showrunner Tasha Huo for Polygon and noted that Camilla Roth's character is a new creation for the series. She told the outlet that she wanted Lara Croft's character to realize that the vision she had of her father and Camilla's father was "complicated and not perfect, and to stop looking up to them" as a model for herself, and noted Camilla's character as a "key element" in the growth of Lara's character. She also told the outlet that there were other scenes, cut from the series, which had Camilla telling more stories about her father, said she is eager to see how fans respond to the series, remarking "I am happy when anyone ships anybody. It's all fun to see. Everyone's art is fantastic. It's great!" and called Camilla different from the men Lara had "been in the shadows of before." In another interview with the same publication, Huo said that the second season would build upon the existing story. It said that it would "explore all the lessons and how those adventures actually challenge her to take those increasing steps closer to being the woman we remember from the '90s." She also noted that, while she is a proponent of self-analysis and therapy, Lara's character uses "adventure as therapy," saying it is a great way for the character to "learn how to be better."

The series' depiction of Croft Manor drew inspiration from multiple iterations of the estate across the Tomb Raider video games and film adaptations. Huo explained that the production team sought to retain familiar architectural features while expanding the mansion with previously unexplored areas.

== Release ==
The first season of Tomb Raider: The Legend of Lara Croft was released on Netflix on October 10, 2024. The second and final season premiered on December 11, 2025.

== Reception ==
The series received mostly positive reviews from critics. On the review aggregator website Rotten Tomatoes, 73% of 22 critics' reviews are positive, with an average rating of 6.5/10. The website's critics' consensus reads: "A solid animated adaptation, The Legend of Lara Croft does a fine job of adding new dimensions to the iconic hero while charting an adventure that's not quite worthy of her." Metacritic, which uses a weighted average, assigned the first season a score of 65 out of 100, based on 7 reviews, indicating "generally favorable" reviews.

Ryan McCaffrey of IGN criticized the series not being compelling, having "generic and minimalist" animation, and lacking humor, asserted that villain Charles Devereaux engaged in villainy in "comic-book-esque levels of camp," and said that he would not be tuning in to a season 2. In contrast, Kayleigh Dray of The Guardian described Lara Croft "performing seemingly impossible feats in the name of archaeology" from the beginning of the series, saying her character was re-imagined in a more feminist way as compared to her original debut, retained the appeal of previous iterations, and Lara was, in her view, "the undisputed custodian of her own complicated life at long last." Sam Stone of Den of Geek said the series provides a "natural evolution for Lara and her journey" while avoiding having its story rooted to the game's events, while remaining thrilling, and having Lara's character as "more confident, self-aware, and fun-loving." Katie Doll of CBR said that the series fills in "missing gaps of Lara's life that weren't previously explored" and argues that Devereaux's character mirrors Lara while the series explores who Lara is as a person beyond a tomb raider, including her trauma, and praised Atwell's voice acting for Lara and the fluid animation in the series.

Nate Richard of Collider praised Lara's character development during the series, but said the series takes a while to get going, praised the voice acting of Atwell, Richard Armitage (as Devereaux) and noted that the relationship between Lara and Camilla Roth is a big highlight, hinting at possible romance between them, and hoped that Camille's character appears in future installments. Rendy Jones of Rogerebert.com said the animated series is the best adaptation of Lara's character, noted the "sharply-angled character designs" and said that animators preserved the "action-adventure elements from the source material" and noted that many scenes and locations flow with "artistic exhilaration," and praised the voice performance of Atwell, arguing it is enhanced by "bold imagery more akin to a psychological thriller." Lyvie Scott of Inverse said the series feels like the "most accurate on-screen portrayal" of Lara and her world and called it a "compelling watch" for long-time and new fans alike.

Manuel Betancourt of The A.V. Club called the series enjoyable because it sticks with the basics of a Tomb Raider tale, while anchoring Lara's emotional journey in her grief following Roth's death, along with entertaining sequences, allowing her to "showcase her wit, knowledge, and many badass moves." Lauren Rouse of Game Rant said the series provides a new look at Lara's story, including her vulnerabilities, praises Atwell's voice acting, calls Devereaux an "excellent foil to Lara's character," and lauds the animation style which harkens back to "classic cartoons" in some ways. In another review, Rouse said that the series is "depicted in an anime style" and compared it to other video game adaptations which have been animated, such as Castlevania, Cyberpunk: Edgerunners, Dota: Dragon's Blood, Arcane: League of Legends, and Dragon Age: Absolution.

Other reviewers gave a mixed reception. Willa Rowe of Kotaku criticized the pacing, plot, and characters, like Devereaux, but praised the performance of Lara Croft as "stunning" and calling her the "saving grace" of the series, and compared the series negatively to Castlevania, and hoped the second season would be better. This contrasted with Marcelo Leite of Screen Rant who praised the animation as echoing the Tomb Raider games, and captures what gameplay is like. Matt Patches of Polygon noted that the series reframed "Conrad Roth's legacy in dramatic fashion," called the scene between Camilla Roth and Lara Croft to possibly be "the steamiest scene in all of Tomb Raider" and asserted that the relationship between both characters either has the vibes of Korrasami (Korra and Asami Sato from The Legend of Korra) or a "deep friendship."

Stanley Hanley, in an article for TheGamer, asserted that the franchise should "stop" trying to create Tomb Raider lore, and stated that Lara's theft of a cursed artifact "sort of delivers consequences to her actions" but criticized it for feeling like viewers should be "sad because she stole something." This differed from Renaldo Matadeen of CBR who noted that the Tomb Raider franchise "didn't acknowledge the damaging nature of European colonialism," argued that the series begins with Lara Croft giving a "white plunder vibe," but ultimately wants to hold "herself accountable in a way that shows growth," differing from Indiana Jones, The Goonies, and National Treasure, even not wanting the relics in her mansion, and saying that the second season it set up for Lara to "explore more cultures," broadening her worldview. However, he notes that although Lara stops her father's relics from being auctioned, she gives them to a museum, even though museums also "contribute to the theft of indigenous artifacts," and points to a scene in Black Panther, but praised the series for having Lara's character self-reflect and challenge "her reasons for treasure hunting."
