= Revelation Online =

2015 video game

- Developer: NetEase
- Publishers: CHN: NetEase; WW: My.com
- Platform: Microsoft Windows
- Release: CHN: June 2015; WW: March 6, 2017
- Genre: MMORPG
- Mode: Multiplayer

Revelation Online is a free-to-play massively multiplayer online role-playing game (MMORPG) developed by NetEase, under the title Revelation (Chinese: 天谕; pinyin: Tiān Yù) in China and Revelation Online in the rest of the world. It is published by My.com in Europe and North America, and received an open release worldwide on March 6, 2017. The game features classic MMORPG gameplay and is set in a world inspired by the books of the Chinese fantasy author Jiang Nan. Revelation Online receives regular update content updates, with the latest, Heaven and Earth, due for release in 2019. Finished on March 12, 2024. Its in-flight combat system and its numerous customization options effectively in gameplay are missed, having no equivalent, only pseudo alter egos like Aion: The Tower of Eternity. There were 3 months of prevention and free content before closure, surpassing the necessary duration to completely finish the game. This leaves little possibility for its re-release or for the tolerance of private servers.

== Gameplay ==
Revelation Online is set in the fantasy world of Nuanor, with its world, characters, and concepts being influenced by Chinese mythology and folklore, and based on stories written by the popular Chinese fantasy author Jiang Nan.

Revelation Online is set in an open world, and features over 100 hours of story content, raids and dungeons. Players can use the power of flight to explore and travel, with aerial combat available once players reach a certain level. Several classes are available, including the Occultist, Assassin, Gunslinger, Spiritshaper, Vanguard, and Swordmage. Players can participate in PvP battles, guild battles, and team up to complete quests or enter into relationships.

The content update Heaven and Earth, due for release in 2019, will add new story content, the ability to marry other players, Battle Companions (animals which act as pets and companions to the player character), and a challenging temple featuring twelve bosses based on the Chinese Zodiac signs.

== Development and release ==
Revelation Online was developed by China-based developer NetEase, who partnered with Blizzard Entertainment on Chinese versions of games such as World of Warcraft, Hearthstone, Diablo III, Warcraft III and StarCraft II. Development started in 2005 and Revelation Online was released for its open beta stage in China in June 2015.

On June 6, 2016, My.com announced it would publish the game in Europe and North America. Mail.Ru, the parent company of My.com, was confirmed as Revelation Online's publisher in Russia. The game was released in a closed beta state in 2016., with the worldwide open release following on March 6, 2017.

=== Business model ===
Revelation Online is free-to-play but allows players to pay for certain in-game content, including cosmetics.

== Reception ==
MMOs.com said the game "overcomes its issues by excelling in its strengths: combat and multiple avenues of progression." MMO GAMES praised Revelation Online's "beautiful graphics and decent storytelling", and added that allowing players to fly sets it apart from other games.
