= Tasha Huo =

American screenwriter and producer

- Born: United States
- Occupations: Screenwriter, showrunner
- Known for: Tomb Raider: The Legend of Lara Croft; The Mighty Nein; Red Sonja

Tasha Huo is an American screenwriter and producer whose work includes the feature film Red Sonja (2025), the Netflix series Tomb Raider: The Legend of Lara Croft (2024–2025), and the Amazon Prime series The Mighty Nein (2025–present). She was named by Variety as one of the ten screenwriters to watch in 2023.

== Early life ==
Huo grew up in California and attended Mills College, and later received an MFA from Boston University. Prior to writing full time, she ran a shelter on Skid Row in Los Angeles.

== Career ==
In 2009, Huo was hired as an assistant at Universal Pictures. In 2013, Warner Brothers partnered with The Black List in a project to develop new talent, and selected her script The Darkness, a revenge thriller, for a two-step WGA deal.

Ubisoft awarded Huo a fellowship in 2018 to write and develop a pilot script for a television adaptation of the popular game Child of Light. In an interview with Variety, Huo stated that she was "a longtime fan of the game" and wanted to capture the theme of a strong female heroine in a fairy tale world in a live-action show.

In 2020, Huo wrote for The Adept, a comic book in the Wuxia genre published by Peter Shiao's Immortal Studios.

Netflix announced Huo as the writer and executive producer of Tomb Raider: The Legend of Lara Croft in January 2021. Its first season functioned as an origin story and centered thematically on Lara's isolation. It debuted in October 2024 to positive reviews. The series was quickly renewed for a second season, which Huo described as developing the character's growing team of allies.

In 2023, Amazon Studios launched a multi-year deal with Critical Role, including exclusive television and first-look film rights. The first project slated was The Mighty Nein, executive produced by Huo and scheduled to premiere in November 2025.

After a long development process, Millennium Media brought Huo in to write a new script for Red Sonja. The film was released by Samuel Goldwyn Films in 2025.

== Credits ==
Year	Title	Writer	Producer	Notes
2022	The Witcher: Blood Origin	Yes	No	Staff writer; miniseries
2024–2025	Tomb Raider: The Legend of Lara Croft	Yes	Yes	Showrunner; Netflix series
2025	Red Sonja	Yes	No	Feature film
2025	The Mighty Nein	Yes	Yes	Showrunner; animated series
