= Owlbear =

Fictional monster from Dungeons & Dragons

- An owlbear, pictured in the original Monster Manual (by Dave Sutherland, 1977)
- First appearance: Greyhawk (1975)

In-universe information
- Type: Magical beast
- Alignment: Neutral

An owlbear (also owl bear) is a fictional creature originally created for the Dungeons & Dragons fantasy role-playing game. An owlbear is depicted as a cross between a bear and an owl, which "hugs" like a bear and attacks with its beak. Inspired by a plastic toy made in Hong Kong, Gary Gygax created the owlbear and introduced the creature to the game in the 1975 Greyhawk supplement; the creature has since appeared in every subsequent edition of the game. Owlbears, or similar beasts, also appear in several other fantasy role-playing games, video games and other media.

== Creation ==
In the early 1970s, Gary Gygax was playing Chainmail, a wargame that also served as a precursor of Dungeons & Dragons. In order to give his players as many different challenges as possible, Gygax was always on the look-out for new monsters. Although he was able to draw on pulp fiction and sword and sorcery stories for many of them, he also looked through dime stores for figurines that could be used in battle. On one of those occasions, he came across a bag of small plastic toys erroneously labeled "prehistoric animals". Made in Hong Kong, the set included monsters from Japanese "Kaiju" films such as Ultraman and the Godzilla franchise. Several of these were odd enough to catch his eye, and he used them to represent several new monsters, including the owlbear, the bulette and the rust monster.

== Concept ==
The owlbear is depicted as an eight-to-ten-foot-tall (2.5 to 3 m) cross between a bear and an owl. According to descriptions in Dungeons & Dragons source books, owlbears are carnivorous creatures, famed for their aggression and ferocity; they live in mated pairs in caves and hunt any creature bigger than a mouse. They use a "hug" and their beak to attack. In the game's third edition, it was categorized as a "magical beast".

The actual in-game origin of the owlbear has never been definitively revealed, but the various Monster Manual editions indicate that it is probably the product of a wizard's experiments. Within the franchise's mythology, the lich Thessalar claims to have created them, but his insanity and egomania put the accuracy of this claim in doubt. In the 5th edition, some elves claim that owlbears have existed for millennia and older fey say that they have always existed in the Feywild.

Within the Dungeons & Dragons system and in other role-playing games, the owlbear usually serves as a monster.

== Publication history ==
The owlbear is among the earliest monsters in Dungeons & Dragons, and, like the bulette and the rust monster, was inspired by a Hong Kong–made plastic toy purchased by Gary Gygax for use as a miniature in a Chainmail game.

=== Dungeons & Dragons ===
The owl bear was introduced to the game in its first supplement, Greyhawk (1975). It is described as a "horrid creature" which "hugs" like a bear, and deals damage with its beak. The owlbear is also listed on random encounter tables in Eldritch Wizardry, the third supplement. The illustration shows a bear-like creature on all fours, and bears no resemblance to the plastic toy that had given Gygax his original inspiration.

=== Advanced Dungeons & Dragons 1st edition ===
The owlbear appears in the first edition Monster Manual (1977), where it is described as a "horrible creature that inhabits tangled forest regions, and attacks with its great claws and snapping beak". The illustration of the owlbear shown in the Monster Manual was done by Dave Sutherland, and closely correlates to Gygax's original plastic toy.

=== Basic Dungeons & Dragons ===
This edition of the D&D game included its own owl bear, in the Dungeons & Dragons Basic Set (1981 and 1983). The owl bear was also later featured in the Dungeons & Dragons Game set (1991), the Dungeons & Dragons Rules Cyclopedia (1991), the Classic Dungeons & Dragons Game set (1994), and the Dungeons & Dragons Adventure Game set (1999).

=== Advanced Dungeons & Dragons 2nd edition ===
The owlbear appears first in the Monstrous Compendium Volume One (1989), and is reprinted in the Monstrous Manual (1993).

The owlbear appeared in the Dark Sun setting in the adventure Black Spine (1994).

The owlbear was detailed in Dragon #214 (February 1995), in "The Ecology of the Owlbear", which also included the arctic owlbear and the winged owlbear. These variants were later reprinted in the Monstrous Compendium Annual Volume Three (1996).

The greater owlbear appeared in an adventure in Dungeon #63 (July 1997).

=== Dungeons & Dragons 3rd edition ===
The owlbear appears in the Monster Manual for this edition (2000).

The owlbear appeared on the Wizards of the Coast website for the Chainmail game, in 2000.

The winged owlbear in adult and juvenile form appeared in Dungeon #84 (January 2001).

The supplemental book Unapproachable East features a feat, an ability that player characters can obtain, named "owlbear berserker" that allows a player character to use a ferocious owlbear-like fighting style.

=== Dungeons & Dragons 3.5 ===
The owlbear appears in the revised Monster Manual for this edition (2003) as well as the owlbear skeleton under the skeleton entry.

The ancient owlbear appeared in Dungeon #107 (February 2004).

The Ankholian owlbear appeared in the Dragonlance, Bestiary of Krynn (2004) and the Revised Bestiary of Krynn (2007).

=== Dungeons & Dragons 4th edition ===
The owlbear appears in the Monster Manual for this edition (2008) along with the winterclaw owlbear. The flavor text mentions that owlbears can be tamed to serve as guards.

=== Dungeons & Dragons Essentials ===
The owlbear as depicted in the 4th edition Monster Manual and the Monster Vault.

The Monster Vault boxed set contains the owlbear as well as various subtypes like the young owlbear, trained owlbear, wind-claw owlbear and again the winterclaw owlbear. The cover of the monster book included in the box and the box itself feature an owlbear alongside other monsters.

=== Dungeons & Dragons 5th edition ===
In May 2012, Wizards of the Coast employee Jon Schindehette announced that the inclusion and design of the owlbear for the upcoming fifth edition of Dungeons & Dragons was being discussed.

The monster was included in the "bestiary" of the D&D Next Playtest Package, a compilation of files available for gamers interested in playtesting this Dungeons & Dragons version before its official release.

The owlbear is included in the Monster Manual of the full release of the game, published in 2014. The flavor text states that remote settlements have used owlbears for racing, and it also states the fact that owlbears are more likely to attack their tamer, than actually begin the race.

== In other role-playing games ==
=== Pathfinder Roleplaying Game ===
The owlbear is an official monster in the Pathfinder Roleplaying Game that is based on Dungeons and Dragons 3.5 edition. It is included in the game's first bestiary, and elaborated on in Dungeon Denizens Revisited. Dungeon Denizens Revisited also includes a variant named siege owlbear. Furthermore, Paizo released a part of the series Behind the Monsters dedicated to the owlbear, which features the bearowl, the possibly "even stranger offspring" of an owlbear. Additional official Pathfinder variants of the owlbear are the arctic owlbear, Darklands owlbear, fruss owlbear, great hook-clawed owlbear, screaming owlbear, sleeyk owlbear, slime owlbear, sloth owlbear as well as the spectral owlbear.

The adventure module Pathfinder #7 – Curse of the Crimson Throne Chapter 1: "Edge of Anarchy" originally published by Paizo Publishing for Dungeons and Dragons 3.5 edition under the OGL contains a taxidermic owlbear. It is a regular owlbear with the skeleton template allowing the game master to turn a regular monster into an undead one. A skeletal owlbear illustration was also done by Goodman Games artist Nick Greenwood.

=== Retro-clones and OSR RPGs ===
As only the design of a role-playing game, not the rules are protected by U.S. copyright law, it is possible for third-party publishers to release RPG systems based on the rules of Dungeons & Dragons without using the actual name or trademarks associated with the brand. These systems are referred to as "retro-clones" or "simulacra". Games not directly using rules of a Dungeons & Dragons edition but claiming to capture the style are often called Old School Renaissance (OSR) games.

The following retro-clones and OSR systems feature the owlbear as an opponent:

- Swords & Wizardry, modelled after the original Dungeons & Dragons from 1974 and published by Mythmere Games.
- Labyrinth Lord by Goblinoid Games.
- Dark Dungeons, Darker Dungeons and Darkest Dungeons (later renamed Blood, Guts and Glory) by Gratis Games all include the owlbear in their bestiary.
- OSRIC, a system emulating Advanced Dungeons & Dragons.
- Mazes & Perils, inspired by the 1977 Holmes version of Dungeons & Dragons.
- Adventurer Conqueror King by Autarch.
- Dungeon Crawl Classics by Goodman Games.
- In Basic Fantasy, the owlbear appears together with the fire-breathing owlbear.
- Microlite74 Basic, Standard and Extended all have owlbears as monsters.
- For Gold & Glory, emulating Advanced Dungeons & Dragons 2nd edition.
- Castles & Crusades by Troll Lord Games.
- Burning THAC0, a variation of The Burning Wheel.

=== Other systems ===
A male half-owlbear, half-blue dragon hybrid named Dragore is featured as an antagonist in the Dungeons & Dragons 3.0 supplement Foul Locales: Beyond the Walls by Mystic Eye Games.

The Manual of Monsters for Warcraft: The Roleplaying Game suggest to use the owlbear as an opponent. A Warcraft-exclusive owlbear-like creature named wildkin is included as well.

Later on, Warcraft: The Roleplaying Game was renamed World of Warcraft: The Roleplaying Game. This edition's Monster Guide, equivalent to the Manual of Monsters, includes the owlbear-like "wildkin" described as a benign creature and associated with the game's Night Elf faction. A larger and more ferocious subtype listed is the "owlbeast".

A third-party Dungeons & Dragons 3.5 edition quick reference card for the owlbear has been published as part of a series of Monster Knowledge Cards.

The owlbears appears in the HackMaster 4th edition Hacklopedia of Beasts Volume VI and the HackMaster 5th edition Hacklopedia of Beasts. Variants included are the lesser owlbear, great horned owlbear and the spotted owlbear.

The HackMaster adventure module Little Keep on the Borderlands features owlbears as enemies and an owlbear on the cover.

Blood & Treasure, modelled after Dungeons & Dragons 3.5 edition, features the owlbear as an opponent.

== In video games ==
=== Dungeons & Dragons-licensed games ===
The owlbear as an opponent in Tower of Doom.

Several video games based on Dungeons & Dragons feature the owlbear:

- The owlbear appears as a regular enemy in the arcade beat 'em up Dungeons & Dragons: Tower of Doom as well as in its sequel Shadow over Mystara. The games were later re-released in a bundle for the Sega Saturn as the Dungeons & Dragons Collection.

=== Warcraft franchise ===
The Wildkin as an NPC enemy in World of Warcraft.

Adaptations of the owlbear appear in the Warcraft universe in several forms:

- Non-player characters known as "wildkin" appear in Warcraft III: Reign of Chaos and its expansion The Frozen Throne. Variants are the enraged wildkin and berserk wildkin. The actual term "owlbear" is only used in Warcraft III: Reign of Chaos and its manual, and not used in its expansion.
- The MMORPG World of Warcraft contains a variety of owlbear-like creatures named "wildkin", mostly as NPCs. The alternative term "owlkin" is used of wildkin living in the fictional Ammen Vale. A variant is the mutated owlkin. A more powerful wildkin is the owlbeast, with deranged owlbeast and raging owlbeast being subtypes. Some wildkin are also called "moonkin", which is also a creature players of the druid class can transform into. A quest for players with the druid class involves defeating a moonkin named Lunaclaw.

=== Other games ===
- Owlbears can be found in the roguelike computer game NetHack.
- Owlbears appear as mobs in the MMORPG EverQuest: The Shadows of Luclin in nineteen variants. They are also featured in its sequel EverQuest II.
- An enemy named "owl bear" appears early into the Master System game Phantasy Star. It resembles an eyeball with bat wings, however, and is called "devil bat" in the original Japanese version.
- The owlbear is a monster in the 1992 SNES game Dragon Quest V: Hand of the Heavenly Bride by Enix (later Square Enix). The monster is also included in the later remakes for the PlayStation 2 and the Nintendo DS Additionally, the Nintendo DS version features a stronger, purple variant called growlbear.
- Tales of Destiny II for the PlayStation 2 features owl bears (オウルベア in the Japanese original).
- There are also owlbears as enemies in Final Fantasy XII. The Japanese original uses the term "owlbear", whereas the English localisation calls the creature "urstrix".
- Owlbears are the protagonists of the 2011 browser game Owlbear Garden.
- The owlbear is featured on a "monster card", a gameplay element in the MMO Kingdom Conquest by Sega.
- Another MMO, Lineage, includes owlbears with various levels of strength as well as a variant named "valley owlbear".
- Owlbears appear in the roguelike game Cataclysm: Dark Days Ahead as a dangerous enemy.
- Owlbears appear in Hidden Through Time 2: Myths and Magic.

== In other media ==
- The Harbinger set, the first set of miniatures for the Dungeons & Dragons Miniatures Game, a collectible miniatures game, has an owlbear miniature. The Blood War set has monster named owlbear ranger. The Against the Giants set includes a furious owlbear.
- In 2012, Wizards of the Coast released a new version of the 1975 adventure board game Dungeon! which features owlbears as opponents.
- Also released in 2012 by Wizards of the Coast, the board game Lords of Waterdeep features a quest card titled "Domesticate Owlbears".
- The owlbear was depicted in the webcomic The Order of the Stick, where it was presented as a pointless cross between an already dangerous creature (a bear) and a harmless animal (an owl).
- A creature called a "nightripper" appears in Sagard the Barbarian #2: The Green Hydra game book by Gary Gygax. The nightripper is described and illustrated as a bear with an owl's head but with talons for forepaws. An illustration of it can be found prefacing section 12: The Kingdom Of Darkness.
- An owlbear also appears in the Japanese light novel series Banished from the Hero's Party.
- In the film Dungeons & Dragons: Honor Among Thieves (2023), the druid Doric assumes the form of an owlbear several times.
- The owlbear was among the monsters featured as trading cards on the back of Amurol Products candy figure boxes.

== Reception ==
Chris Sims of the on-line magazine ComicsAlliance referred to the owlbear as "the second-greatest monster in the history of D&D". Dave Chalker from Critical-Hits.com, a RPG blog which won the Ennie Gold 2011 Ennie Award for Best Blog, recommended the use of the owlbear as a monster. Rob Bricken from io9 named the owlbear as the sixth most memorable D&D monster, while the game's chroniclers Witwer et al. counted the owlbear among the "iconic D&D monsters".
