= Basic Fantasy RPG =

Role-playing game

Basic Fantasy Role-Playing Game
- Cover of the 4th Edition
- Designers: Chris Gonnerman
- Publishers: Self-published
- Years active: 2006–present
- Genres: Fantasy
- Playing time: Varies
- Chance: Dice rolling
- Skills: Role-playing, improvisation, tactics, arithmetic
- Website: www.basicfantasy.org

Basic Fantasy Role-Playing Game (also commonly known as Basic Fantasy RPG and abbreviated BFRPG), is an open source retro-clone role-playing game written by Chris Gonnerman that emulates, and is largely compatible with, the 1981 Basic and Expert sets of Dungeons & Dragons. Its main differences from B/X D&D include d20-style ascending armor class and separation of character race and class. It was first published in print in 2007 and updated in 2008, 2014, and 2023. The game is one of the first products of the Old School Revival and has been positively received.

== History ==
With his original copies of the Basic and Expert rules having fallen into disrepair from use, Gonnerman found himself in need of a replacement for himself, as well as copies he could legally share with his players. At the time, the potential use of the Open Game License (OGL) and d20 System Reference Document were being actively discussed as an avenue toward making clones of games no longer in print, but no one had yet succeeded.

While created in its own right to emulate and improve upon the inspirational work of Tom Moldvay and David Cook, Basic Fantasy also derives inspiration from Gonnerman's earlier RPG, Project 74, itself a retro-clone of fantasy gaming of the mid-1970s.

After Gonnerman released a downloadable preview of the work in progress on January 1, 2006, OSRIC also began development, but Stuart Marshall has stated that BFRPG came first. Contemporaries Labyrinth Lord and Swords & Wizardry followed after. The first edition of Basic Fantasy was published in softcover and offered for purchase on February 28, 2007. The current version, 4th Edition revision 132, was released on June 10, 2023.

According to The Orr Group Industry Report, Basic Fantasy is in the top 45 games played worldwide on Roll20 — more popular than its contemporaries Labyrinth Lord, Swords & Wizardry, and Dungeon Crawl Classics, as well as Original D&D.

== Design ==
Basic Fantasy was designed to be rules-light and simple enough for children to learn while having sufficient depth and expandability to engage adults.

The game is modular, providing a core framework for four essential classes from levels 1 to 20. The core rulebook combines the functions of a player character (PC) manual, a game master (GM) guide, and a monster reference in one volume. With the rules as written, it makes minor changes from its original 1981 inspiration in separating race from class, using the d20 ascending armor class scheme and dispensing with alignment. However, it is expected that GMs will implement house rules to adapt the game to their own preferences, and the community website provides additional and alternate rules that can be added to the core game. Additional classes, additional races, conversion tools and other accessories for PCs and the GM are also available for free, allowing the game to be scaled to the desired complexity, similar to the advanced fantasy games of the 1980s, if desired. The author's own customized house rules are published as The Glain Companion.

As an open source gaming system, it has grown and changed similarly to other successful open source projects using that model, "supported by dedicated fans worldwide who have contributed hundreds of pages of rules supplements, adventure modules, and other useful and enjoyable game materials".

== License change ==
On January 7, 2023, Gonnerman expressed concern that pending changes to the OGL represented "an existential threat" to the future of the system. He proposed a switch to the Creative Commons Attribution-ShareAlike 4.0 International license, and after receiving positive feedback, work commenced on auditing the text content of the core rulebook with the goal of modifying or removing any verbiage similar to that found in the System Reference Document. The resulting book was dubbed the 4th Edition and released on June 10, 2023.

== Reception ==
In a review of Basic Fantasy Role-Playing Game in Black Gate, M Harold Page said "Overall, this game does what it sets out to do, and does it with conviction. It's an inexpensive, exhaustive, and approachable system. A motivated early teen could master it quickly, though with some mentoring because they would need to know what roleplaying was and would be well advised to ignore the paragraph where it recommends that players be responsible for mapping according to the DM's descriptions, They might also want to apply selected additions from the website's PDFs."
