= Wayfarers (role-playing game) =

Pencil and paper role-playing game

Wayfarers is a pencil and paper role-playing game (RPG) released in the fall of 2008 by the Ye Olde Gaming Companye (YOGC). It was created by Jimmy T. Swill and Gregory Vrill. The names Jimmy Swill and Gregory Vrill are used within the book as names for example characters.

Wayfarers is a swords and sorcery fantasy RPG, and it references the Wizards of the Coast (WoTC) Open Gaming License (OGL) and System Reference Document (SRD), an open source document allowing publishers to employ material from the d20 system version of the Dungeons & Dragons RPG, which is published by the WoTC. In addition, the YOGC publishes Wayfarers under its own Open Gaming License.

Wayfarers is similar in style and form to the first edition of Advanced Dungeons & Dragons (AD&D) by Gary Gygax and Dave Arneson, but has a classless skill-based player character creation system and employs character proficiencies similar to those in the 2nd edition of AD&D by David "Zeb" Cook.

Despite referencing the WoTC SRD, Wayfarers is not true to the mechanics of D&D as games such as Labyrinth Lord, OSRIC, and Swords & Wizardry which also reference the SRD, and due to their similarities to this source material are often called retro-clones or simulacra. As an example, unlike D&D, armor in Wayfarers reduces damage, and there is no Armor Class. It has been suggested that Wayfarers is a 're-imagining' of D&D, wherein the game evolved towards a class-less, level-less approach like GORE. The game is sold in hardcover, paperback and PDF. The YOGC and the "YOGC community" produces a publication called the "Wayfarers Guild Journal" that supplements the game, with the first issue published 01/19/09.

Wayfarers was revised and released by Mongoose Publishing in March 2012.
