= Swords & Spells =

Tabletop role-playing game supplement for Dungeons & Dragons

Dungeons & Dragons Supplement V: Swords & Spells
- Author: Gary Gygax
- Genre: Role-playing game
- Publisher: TSR, Inc.
- Publication date: 1976
- Pages: 45

Swords & Spells is a supplementary rulebook by Gary Gygax for the original edition of the Dungeons & Dragons fantasy role-playing game. Its product designation is TSR 2007.

== Contents ==
Swords & Spells was a supplement of miniature rules, for use with the original D&D set. It contained battle rules for miniature-scale that were meant to be more compatible with the D&D rules than those of Chainmail.

Swords & Spells is a set of large scale miniatures battle rules for use with Dungeons & Dragons, an expansion and update to the Chainmail rules. A sample game is provided in the appendix which includes examples of how magic is used.

== Publication history ==
Swords & Spells was written by Gary Gygax, with art by David C. Sutherland III, and was published by TSR in 1976 as a 48-page digest-sized book.

Swords & Spells was published by TSR, Inc. in 1976, the fifth and final supplement to the original Dungeons & Dragons boxed set, and is sometimes informally referred to as "Supplement V", with the official supplements Greyhawk and Blackmoor having been released in the previous year, and Eldritch Wizardry and Gods, Demi-gods & Heroes released previously in the same year. It does not, however, bear the official "Supplement V" designation on the cover, as "Gods, Demi-gods & Heroes" is stated in its introduction to be "the last D&D supplement." Swords & Spells' product designation was TSR 2007.

The 45-page Swords & Spells has been billed as "The fantasy-based successor to Chainmail," and indeed is stated within the introductory text to be "the grandson of Chainmail." The Chainmail rules originally formed the measurement and combat systems for the Dungeons & Dragons game, as the D&D rules could be cumbersome when conducting battles between armies. Improvisation was required, since D&D contained monsters and spells not covered in Chainmail. In Swords & Spells Gygax tried to fix this problem by introducing a diceless approach for large battles which averaged each monster's D&D statistics.

Swords & Spells proved unpopular, and its rules were discarded in later editions of D&D.

== Reception ==
Robert R. Taylor reviewed Swords & Spells in The Space Gamer No. 11. He commented that "S&S is extremely well done. The layout is excellent, the artwork is good and appropriate, and the rules are superb. They are written in a clear, easy style that allows for quick assimilation." Taylor added that "The rules are particularly strong in one of the most difficult areas of fantasy miniatures - magic. The spell casting and spell chart make applying D&D magic to miniatures very simple and straightforward." He also noted that the examples of magic in the sample game "helps in further clarifying this often nebulous area of fantasy wargaming". He felt that "The other rules are equally logical and concise, and make S&S a highly recommended buy for someone just getting interested in miniatures wargaming." Taylor concluded his review by saying, "Although the author (Gary Gygax) obviously spent a great deal of time and effort on these rules, especially the magic section, some concessions were made to allow for a more streamlined approach to miniatures. This reviewer found S&S to have a nice balance between complexity and playability. The staff of TSR should be congratulated for another fine piece of work."

Lawrence Schick, in his 1991 book Heroic Worlds, described this book as "Sloppily produced, with some howling blunders in the rules."

David M. Ewalt, in his book Of Dice and Men, commented that Swords and Spells "is the odd man out in the original D&D rule set. Rather than adding new details to the fantasy role-playing game, it takes a glance backward and provides rules for large-scale miniature war games that are merely based on Dungeons & Dragons. In his foreword, editor Tim Kask describes it as 'the grandson of Chainmail.'"

== Reviews ==
- The Playboy Winner's Guide to Board Games
