= Tim Kask =

American role-playing game writer and editor (1949–2025)

Timothy J. Kask
- Born: Timothy James Kask; January 14, 1949; Moline, Illinois, U.S.
- Died: December 30, 2025 (aged 76)
- Occupations: Game designer, editor
- Writing career
- Genres: Role-playing games, fantasy, wargames

Timothy James Kask (January 14, 1949 – December 30, 2025) was an American editor and writer in the role-playing game industry. Kask became interested in board games in his childhood, and later turned to miniatures wargames. While attending university after a stint in the U.S. Navy, he was part of a group that playtested an early version of the new role-playing game Dungeons & Dragons (D&D) for game co-designer Gary Gygax. Gygax hired him as the first employee of TSR, Inc. in 1975. After editing some of TSR's early D&D publications, Kask became editor of The Strategic Review, which later became Dragon, and then Dragon Magazine.

Kask left TSR in 1980 to publish a new magazine, Adventure Gaming, but when that failed, he left the games industry in 1983 and spent some time as a freelance editor and speechwriter before becoming a teacher. In 2010 he returned to the games industry as one of the co-founders of Eldritch Enterprises.

== Early life ==
Tim Kask was born and raised in Moline, Illinois. At age 11, he became interested in Avalon Hill's board wargame D-Day, and played it frequently for three years. During a four-year stint with the U.S. Navy (1967–1971) during the Vietnam War, he often played 1914, another Avalon Hill game. He married his wife Cheryl in 1970, and they have a daughter, and a son.

After leaving the navy, Kask attended Southern Illinois University’s campus in Carbondale, Illinois. While there, he was introduced to miniature wargaming, including Chainmail. Kask phoned Chainmail author Gary Gygax with some questions about the game. This developed into a series of long late-night phone conversations about miniatures rules that eventually resulted in Gygax's invitation to Kask to come to the Gen Con gaming convention in Lake Geneva, Wisconsin. There Kask finally met Gygax in person for the first time. At the time, Gygax was co-developing the rules for a new type of game that he called "The Fantasy Game". Kask sat in on the two sample sessions that Gygax offered, thereby becoming one of the first people outside of Gygax's family and friends to play what would become Dungeons & Dragons.

== In the games industry ==
In 1975, a year after the original rules to Dungeons & Dragons were published by Tactical Studies Rules (soon to become TSR Hobbies and then TSR, Inc.), Gygax hired Kask as an editor, the first full-time employee of the new company. Kask's first assignment was editing, developing, and contributing to the Blackmoor rules supplement. Kask became editor of The Strategic Review, starting with Issue #5. Kask authorized Jennell Jaquays through a casual license to publish The Dungeoneer as a fanzine to publish adventures for gamemasters to use. In 1976 Kask edited the final three supplementary rules booklets for the original D&D rules: Eldritch Wizardry, Gods, Demi-gods & Heroes, and Swords & Spells. Kask's focus within TSR then changed, as he oversaw the formation of TSR Periodicals. He split The Strategic Review into two new periodicals: Dragon, devoted to D&D; and Little Wars, devoted to historical board gaming and miniatures play. Kask was the editor of the first 33 issues of Dragon (soon renamed Dragon Magazine). Kask developed and edited TSR's historical board game, William the Conqueror, 1066, and was responsible for starting the Days of the Dragon line of calendars. During the development of Advanced Dungeons & Dragons and Basic Dungeons & Dragons in the late 1970s, Kask helped Gygax delineate the differences between the two game systems.

Kask was responsible for hiring a number of people at TSR who subsequently went on to become influential creators in the role-playing game industry, including Kim Mohan.

He resigned from TSR in 1980, and later revealed that he had disagreed with the creation of Advanced Dungeons & Dragons. He had originally written in the foreword to Eldritch Wizardry that "D&D was meant to be a free-wheeling game, only loosely bound by the parameters of the rules." Later he wrote, "It all starting going bad with the publishing of AD&D, The Player's Handbook. Here come the rules lawyers, the nitpickers and the homegrown experts. The fun started to leech away within months. Now there were dicta, dogma and regulations; gone were the days of guidelines."

Kask stayed in the games industry for a few years, re-developing Naval War for Avalon Hill in late 1981. He also started up Manzakk Publishing in order to become the publisher and editor of a new games magazine, Adventure Gaming. Kask was able to sell advertising space, and on paper he should have made money. But due to the ongoing recession of the early 1980s, many of his advertisers were in financial trouble, and he had difficulty collecting any of his ad revenue. Kask was forced to cease publication after only 13 issues, admitting that "I lost my shirt" in what he called "a crushing defeat."

== After TSR ==
Following the failure of Adventures Games in 1983, Kask left the games industry to do freelance editing, ghost-writing, and speech-writing. He went back to school in 2002, and after earning a master's degree in Education from Xavier University in Cincinnati, Ohio, he became a teacher.

In 2006 Kask was a celebrity auctioneer, with Frank Mentzer, at Gen Con Indy. He joined Mentzer as a special guest at the Lake Geneva Gaming Convention in 2007 and 2008. Kask and Mentzer frequently returned to the role of auctioneer at Gen Con Indy until 2017, which was ultimately the final year for each in that capacity.

Jim Ward, a fellow TSR employee in the early days of the company, who had become managing editor of The Crusader magazine, persuaded Kask to write a monthly column for his magazine.

At the KC Game Fair in November 2010, Kask announced his return to the games industry as one of the founders (with Mentzer, Jim Ward and Chris Clark) of Eldritch Enterprises, which would publish a variety of general works as well as new creations for role-playing games.

In 2012, Kask became a contributing editor for Gygax Magazine. This quarterly journal, published by Ernie and Luke Gygax, sons of the late Gary Gygax, was dedicated to "old school" Dungeons & Dragons. Six issues were published from 2013 to 2016, but the Gygax brothers ceased publication when Gary's widow, Gail Gygax, initiated a trademark dispute over the magazine's name.

== Death ==
Kask died after a short illness on December 30, 2025, at the age of 76.
