= Black Sword Hack =

Tabletop roleplaying game

Old School Dark Fantasy
- Designers: Alexandre "Kobayashi" Jeannette
- Publishers: Livres de l'Ours; The Merry Mushmen
- Publication: 2020; 2023 (Ultimate Chaos Edition)
- Genres: Dark fantasy, sword and sorcery
- Systems: The Black Hack

Black Sword Hack is a dark fantasy / sword and sorcery themed tabletop roleplaying game developed by French independent RPG designer Alexandre "Kobayashi" Jeannette.

== Description ==
The game is broadly included within the "Old School Renaissance" movement within role-playing games, loosely emulating older editions of Dungeons and Dragons while not cleaving precisely to their rules and mechanics. The rules are based primarily on The Black Hack (hence the system's name), with changes made to support its more narrow subgenre focus. It is strongly inspired by the sword and sorcery fiction of Michael Moorcock, Robert E. Howard, Poul Anderson, and Fritz Leiber, with Moorcock's Eternal Champion mythos serving as the most prominent of its influences. The game's design philosophy focuses more on genre, setting, and the assumptions that come with them rather than on having deeply involved game mechanics, and opts for a "rules-light" approach.

Unlike The Black Hack, Black Sword Hack does not use pre-defined character classes, instead having a more freeform character creation system. Players select one of three "Origins", representing three types of society as portrayed in sword and sorcery fiction (Barbarian, Civilized, and Decadent), and then select three "Backgrounds" from a list of twenty-six which determine their unique abilities, at least two of which must be from the Origin the player chose. Black Sword Hack makes use of the "supply dice" system from The Black Hack as a method of tracking resources, but does not use them to keep track of numerically quantifiable things like ammunition or food supplies, instead using them only to measure abstract resources like social capital or favors. The game also introduces a new variant of supply dice in the form of a "Doom die" that represents a player character's luck running out. A player puts themselves at risk rolling the doom die any time they use certain actions (such as special attacks in combat, or many of the game's supernatural powers), and can choose to "call on Doom" in order to increase their chances of succeeding at an attribute test. Once the Doom die has been depleted, a player character suffers severe penalties and can no longer take actions that require them to roll the die, remaining in this state until they can safely rest for a night. Combat rules and statistics for hostile NPCs are simple, with minimal dice-rolling required on the part of the GM.

A variety of different magical powers are available as options for players, all of which carry significant risks or require them to manage limited resources in exchange for being very powerful. Casting spells using the chaotic power of sorcery, for example, carries a small chance of permanent or even significant harm to the spellcaster on a critical failure. Pacts can be made with demons for an alternative system of dark magic, but invoking a demon utilizes the Doom die, and depleting it can result in the demon hurting the player or betraying them. High-tech gadgets and magical items can be created via "Twisted Science", but need to be repaired or rebuilt once their usage dice run out. A player can also find and wield cursed weapons with a will of their own (inspired by Moorcock's Stormbringer), but these are disloyal and have a chance of attempting to kill the player or others around them.

== Publication history ==
The game was originally written in French, and has been translated into English and Ukrainian, though only the French and English translations are available in print. The rules in all three languages have been released under an open gaming license and can be accessed online via GitHub.

The first edition was published in 2020 by Livres de l'Ours. An expanded second edition, branded as the "Ultimate Chaos Edition", was published in 2023 by The Merry Mushmen. It makes only very small changes to the original system, but introduces a number of new rules not present in the first edition, including a new category of magical power (Faerie Ties) and more detailed rules for travel and ship combat. The second edition also features full-color artwork by fantasy artist Goran Gligović.

Official supplements for the game, containing optional rules, additional Origins and Backgrounds, new monsters, and premade adventures, have been intermittently released through a zine called The Chaos Crier, also published by The Merry Mushmen. These optional rules are primarily contributed by designers other than Jeannette.

== Reception ==
Black Sword Hack has received several favourable reviews, in particular since the publication of the second edition. Critics have praised it for capturing the feel of its source material and having streamlined rules. In contrast, it has also received some criticism from Stormbringer!, a fan site for Chaosium's older Stormbringer RPG, for being more broad and generic in practice than its predecessors.
