= The Black Hack =

Tabletop role-playing game

Cover of second edition, 2018

The Black Hack is a fantasy role-playing game, designed by David Black and released by the indie publisher Gold Piece Publications in 2016 that streamlines the rules of the original edition of Dungeons & Dragons.

== Description ==
When the original edition of D&D was published in 1974, the rules were, in the words of RPG historian Stu Horvath, "a mess: Rambling, poorly organized, and incomprehensible in some places." The rules assumed that players owned:

- the miniatures wargame Chainmail and were familiar with its measurement and combat systems.
- Outdoor Survival, a board game by then-unaffiliated company Avalon Hill for outdoor exploration and adventure.

As time went on, various gamemasters developed "hacks", improvements to the rules.

With the inception of the Old School Renaissance (OSR) movement in 2000s, gamers showed renewed interest in the original edition of D&D. However, all of the problems with the original rules still existed. In 2016, David Black developed a new hack: a set of rules based on the original edition of D&D, but re-organized, streamlined, and using some modern role-playing rules.

Rules taken from the original edition include the four classic character classes (Fighter, Thief, Cleric and Wizard), but a combat system has been added to replace the need for a copy of Chainmail. The modern concept of rolling for advantage/disadvantage (rolling two dice and taking either the better number — advantage — or the worse number — disadvantage) replaces the old system of adding up various bonuses or penalties before making a die roll.

The emphasis on dice rolling has been moved from the gamemaster to the players. If the players are fighting a monster, the gamemaster does not roll dice for an attack. Instead, the players make a defense roll. Reducing a character to zero hit points resulted in death in the original game; using these new rules, the player rolls a die and consults a table for a result, which can include unconsciousness death, or various penalties to attribute scores.

In the much expanded second edition, many pages are devoted to helping the gamemaster run a campaign.

== Publication history ==
In 2016, David Black developed a set of rules for a fantasy role-playing game based on the original edition of D&D. Black self-published The Black Hack, a slim 20-page booklet, in 2016. Two years later, a much expanded second edition boxed set was published by Gold Piece Publications, with artwork by David Black, Jeff Call, Sean Poppe, and Karl Sternjberg.

In 2023, a greatly expanded Italian translation that included a campaign setting and several adventures was published by MS Edizioni as a 220-page softcover book.

== Reception ==
Panayiotis Lines, writing for Leyline Press, commented, "Though The Black Hack makes many changes to the original D&D formula it's still well compatible with any classic old school D&D module as well as any module designed for a modern day retro clone. This is due to it keeping multiple familiar elements that can be ported across but changing them in a unique but consistent manner." Lines concluded, "Overall The Black Hack is a clean and light weight package for running OSR style games, character creation is quick, the core resolution mechanic means the GM can adjudicate situations easily and everything being player facing puts the onus on players to describe how they avoid attacks, traps and dangers within the game."

Technical Grimoire commented, "this not only contains a solid system, but it acts like a GM workbook, walking you through EVERYTHING you need to know about running a game. Not rules and monsters, but by showing examples and then encouraging you to try it right there on the pages."

Guilia Gastaldi reviewed the Italian edition and noted, "This 220-page game manual pays great attention to the aesthetic side ... The maps and illustrations are also of high quality and perfectly convey the tones of the macabre and dark setting of The Black Hack. Gastaldi concluded, "I recommend The Black Hack to players (both novices and non-novices) who love risky adventures and dark settings. A tip, though: don’t get too attached to your character!"

In his 2023 book Monsters, Aliens, and Holes in the Ground, RPG historian Stu Horvath called the second edition "one of the purest refinements of a D&D hack ever to see print." Horvath noted that the rules only took up about 30 pages of the book, "so polished they're nearly slippery." Horvath thought the major section of the book devoted to gamemasters "is even more impressive and energetic ... It breaks down everything into easy-to-use, easy-to-comprehend chunks, then nudges the GM to mess around with them." Horvath concluded, "Easy to pick up, fast to run, without an ounce of nonsense while remaining open and flexible enough for players to fill with whatever wild ideas they imagine. Glitteringly perfect, it's the rare oasis that isn't a mirage."

== See also ==
- Black Sword Hack
