= Matthew J. Finch =

American writer, game designer and artist

Matthew J. Finch is an American writer, award-winning tabletop role-playing game designer, and artist, best known for his contributions to the Old School Renaissance movement. His work has been instrumental in reviving and popularizing a style of role-playing that emulates the early editions of Dungeons & Dragons (D&D).

In 2006, Finch co-created OSRIC, the first Old-School Renaissance or Old School Revival retro-clone of a previously published roleplaying game, first edition of Advanced Dungeons & Dragons (AD&D). OSRIC serves as a rule set that emulates the mechanics of AD&D, allowing publishers to create new content compatible with the original rules. OSRIC is highly regarded as a cornerstone of the OSR movement, making it easier for new players and publishers to access and build upon classic RPG material.

Finch is also the creator of Swords & Wizardry, another significant retro-clone that simplifies the rules of the original 1974 edition of Dungeons & Dragons. The game captures the spirit of early D&D while offering streamlined mechanics, making it accessible to both new and veteran players. Swords & Wizardry has become one of the flagship games of the OSR movement, known for its flexibility and ease of use. For its rules, it won the tabletop role-playing game industry's 2009 Ennie for Best Free Product - Silver Award.

== Early life ==
Matthew J. Finch was born Sugarland, Texas, in November 15, 1967. He played Dungeon and Dragons when he was young, which nurtured his love for games, and helped him later create Swords & Wizardry later in life. Matthew was accepted to Harvard and later Cambridge as well.

== Education ==
Matthew J. Finch went to Harvard College and Georgetown University Law Center to pursue become a practicing attorney.

== Career ==
Matthew Finch is a role-playing game designer associated with the Old School Renaissance movement.

Finch wrote the Swords and Wizardry Complete Rulebook, OSRIC, Old-School Primer and other works, and is the founder of Mythmere Games. He maintains a YouTube channel, Matt Finch RPG Studio, where he talks about and plays retro games such as OSR and D&D. Since 2008 Finch has been active on his blog, Uncle Matt's Blog, where he writes about OSR, D&D and S&W.

Matt is an involved member of the community, given he still writes for and makes content for his game Swords & Wizardry. He is featured in many Gaming publications, He was featured on The Save or Die Podcast! to discuss OSR, and his kickstarter, for the Swords and Wizardry Complete box set which reached 50,000$ before the first 24 hours. Matt now lives in Central Texas with his family. He is an active Marathon Runner, and Smoke Jumper.

Matt Finch is a founding partner of Frog God Games, he is also the Creative Director for Frog God Games.

== Game philosophy ==
A 2023 PhD thesis by Scott Michael Bruner notes that Finch "argues that the contingent outcomes of actions in early TRPGs, such as D&D, are resolved through an uncertain dialog (between DM, players, and rules), rather than through a set of static rules" and that "Finch implies that modern TRPGs concede more authorial responsibility to their rules rather than through dialog during play. This may be true to make the modern TRPG more accessible to contemporary audiences used to videogames (with bounded mechanics) rather than the flexibility of classic wargames. There are many modern TRPGs which complicate Finch's generalization."
