= Adventure Gaming =

Magazine

- Issue 1, July 1981
- Editor: Tim Kask
- Frequency: Monthly
- Publisher: Manzakk Publishing
- Founded: 1980
- First issue: July 1981
- Final issue Number: 1982; 13

Adventure Gaming was a consumer magazine published by Manzakk Publishing, Inc. covering all aspects of the burgeoning gaming industry. Starting in July 1981, it ran for 13 issues and ceased publication in 1982.

== History and profile ==
Tim Kask, founding editor of The Dragon, TSR's house magazine that focused on Dungeons & Dragons, departed after Issue #36 (April 1980) to create a magazine of his own. Kask founded Manzakk Publishing in Norwood, Ohio, and Adventure Gaming was launched in 1981.

Adventure Gaming tried to cover both the booming FRP (fantasy role-playing) segment of the game industry and the traditional board and miniatures gaming segments. Game historian Shannon Appelcline noted, "[Kask's] new venture was more generalist than The Dragon, but otherwise looked a lot like Kask's first magazine with an emphasis on (generic) FRP [fantasy role-playing games], Traveller, and wargaming.

The magazine failed to find an audience, and ceased publication in 1982 after 13 issues.

== Reception ==
In Issue 3 of Pegasus, Lewis Pulsipher commented, "I think the hobby really needs a magazine like this. But the editors of the Dragon decided that they couldn't do it in 90 pages a month; can AG do it in 40? At any rate, if you have broad gaming interest, buy No. 1 or No. 2, and let's hope that AG can build a circulation sufficient to survive."

In Issue 45 of The Space Gamer, W. G. Armintrout didn't like the new magazine, stating, "As of now, Adventure Gaming is a colorless publication that hasn't gotten itself off the ground. The only reason for subscribing would be if you have a personal motive for helping an all-hobby magazine survey. I don't recommend it."

In Issue 15 of Abyss, Dave Nalle thought the first two issues of the magazine lacked focus, commenting, "This magazine attempts to meld together Boardgaming and Fantasy Gaming, and does some interesting things in this direction. However it is exceptionally weak in content, mainly, I think, because of poor editorial guidance." Nalle concluded "This is a very shakey [sic] magazine. It tries to do the things which a lot of other magazines like Strategy & Tactics or The General do better, and in another area it shows a poor second to any other FRPing magazine."
