= Eldritch Wizardry =

1976 role-playing game supplement for D&D

Dungeons & Dragons Supplement III: Eldritch Wizardry
- Author: Gary Gygax and Brian Blume
- Genre: Role-playing game
- Publisher: TSR, Inc.
- Publication date: 1976
- Pages: 60

Eldritch Wizardry is a supplementary rulebook by Gary Gygax and Brian Blume, written for the original edition of the Dungeons & Dragons (D&D) fantasy role-playing game, which included a number of significant additions to the core game. Its product designation is TSR 2005.

== Contents ==
Eldritch Wizardry introduced psionics and the druid character class. The 60-page supplement added several other new concepts to the D&D game, including demons (and their lords Orcus and Demogorgon), psionics-using monsters (such as mind flayers), and artifacts (including the Rod of Seven Parts and the Axe of the Dwarvish Lords).

A human character regardless of alignment or character class, with the exception of monks and druids, may have a chance to possess psionic ability. Each character classes has a separate list of psionic abilities which such characters might possess, and the book presents various psionic attack and defense modes. The druid, previously appearing in the Greyhawk supplement as a monster, is expanded in Eldritch Wizardry as a sub-class of the cleric, presented as a neutral-aligned priest of nature worship. The book introduces seven different types of demons, as well as creatures with psionic attack forms, and astral and ethereal creatures, such as brain moles, thought eaters, su-monsters, and intellect devourers. Eldritch Wizardry presents a modified combat system which utilizes new rules such as the type of armor for each character, weapon readiness, encumbrance, and level of spell being used. The supplement includes more than twenty artifacts and relics with incredible powers meant to be unknown to the players, who must learn about the items through rumor or trial and error. The book adds new wilderness encounter charts which also take the new monsters into account as well as the character classes included in the previously published game supplements and issues of The Strategic Review.

== Publication history ==
Eldritch Wizardry was written by Gary Gygax and Brian Blume and published by TSR in 1976 as a sixty-page digest-sized book, and was the third supplement to the original D&D rules. The supplement was part of the continuing expansion of D&D in 1976, which also included Gods, Demi-Gods & Heroes and Swords & Spells.

It bears the designation Supplement III, following the Greyhawk and Blackmoor supplements, which were released the previous year, and its product number was TSR 2005. Illustrations were provided by David C. Sutherland III, Tracy Lesch, and Gary Kwapisz, with a cover by Deborah Larson. The booklet was edited by Tim Kask.

Material from Eldritch Wizardry, along with the original Dungeons & Dragons and the Greyhawk and Blackmoor supplements, was revised by J. Eric Holmes for the Dungeons & Dragons Basic Set (1977). Some of the moral panic against D&D began in 1976 when Eldritch Wizardry was published.

The Eldritch Wizardry supplement was reproduced as part of a deluxe, premium reprinting of the original "White Box" on November 19, 2013, with new packaging in an oaken box. Each booklet comes with new cover art but otherwise reproduces the original content and interior art faithfully.

== Reception ==
Glen Taylor reviewed Eldritch Wizardry in The Space Gamer No. 7. He felt that, like the Greyhawk and Blackmoor supplements before it, Eldritch Wizardry introduces new material to the basic D&D game system "for a more intricate, complex playing experience. Like the other supplements, the new material in EW is organized around the original format for easy absorption into the basic structure of the game." He notes psionic abilities as the first major addition in the book: "The list of psionic abilities is long and varied, and most of them are very useful." He felt that some players may find the modified combat system "too cumbersome, but I find them much more logical than simply rolling a die to see which side gets to strike first". He felt that the section on artifacts was "designed to put some of the mystery and danger back into D&D. I feel they have succeeded admirably." He felt that the wilderness tables were "an element sorely-needed" and "produce the very desirable effect of having some types of monsters substantially more common than others, and since this is achieved by duplication of types on the same table, players can freely alter anything with which they don't agree, as well as insert their own fiendish monster types into the charts". Taylor called the physical quality of Eldritch Wizardry "excellent" and the artwork "superb", and felt that the book was "well worth the admittedly high price", concluding that it is "as good as Greyhawk, and that's saying a lot. It should put the spice of danger and unpredictability back into D&D, and partially satiate that hunger for new material that typifies D&D enthusiasts everywhere."

RPGnet reviewed the book in 2001 as vintage nostalgia rating it with a 4 for style ("Classy and well done"), and a 4 for substance ("Meaty"), and saying "From the depths of RPG history, it's one of the books that started it all."

== Reviews ==
- Panzerfaust and Campaign #75
