= HackMaster Player's Handbook =

4th edition Player's Handbook cover

HackMaster Player's Handbook is a 2001 role-playing game supplement published by Kenzer & Company for HackMaster.

== Contents ==
HackMaster Player's Handbook is a supplement in which a tongue‑in‑cheek yet mechanically robust homage offers expanded character creation options, rules, and the full core system needed to play.

== Reviews ==
- Backstab #34
- Realms of Fantasy
