= Blackmoor (supplement) =

Tabletop role-playing game supplement for Dungeons & Dragons

Dungeons & Dragons Supplement II: Blackmoor
- The original Blackmoor supplement (TSR, Inc., 1975)
- Author: Dave Arneson
- Genre: Role-playing game
- Publisher: TSR, Inc.
- Publication date: 1975
- Pages: 60

Blackmoor is a supplementary rulebook (product designation TSR 2004) of the original edition of the Dungeons & Dragons fantasy role-playing game written by Dave Arneson (with a foreword by Gary Gygax).

== Contents ==
Blackmoor, the second supplement to the original Dungeons & Dragons rules, is known for its introduction of rules for underwater adventures and hit location, and the addition of the monk and assassin character classes.

Dave Arneson named the booklet after his original role-playing campaign world, Blackmoor. It has additional rules, monsters, treasures, and the first role-playing game adventure ever published, The Temple of the Frog. Despite the name, the supplement includes almost no information on Arneson's version of the world.

Blackmoor added two new character classes to the game: the assassin, a sub-class of the thief; and the monk, a "monastic martial arts" sub-class of the cleric, intended to be a hybrid of the fighter and thief classes. The Sage character was also introduced, but changed to a Non-Player Character type and moved to the back of the booklet by the editor.

The book also introduced a section on diseases and a hit location system, wherein each individual body part of a character or monster was assigned its own hit points. The odds of hitting any specific body part changed depending on the character's height and weapon reach. If any individual body part was brought down to zero hit points, the creature would be crippled or killed.

The supplement introduced rules for underwater adventures, such as rules and guidelines for swimming, equipment weight restrictions when fighting underwater, and the effects of underwater combat on weapons and spells. Blackmoor also includes numerous new water-dwelling monsters and equipment useful for underwater adventures. A number of these underwater monsters and magic items were the creations of Steve Marsh, added to the supplement in order to compensate for material by Arneson left out of the final edit.

== Publication history ==
Following the release of the original Dungeons & Dragons rulebooks, Gary Gygax and Dave Arneson decided to publish expansions of their respective campaigns. For Arneson, this expansion would be based on his Blackmoor campaign, which had originated in the first quarter of 1971. In March 1975, Gygax told a wargaming newsletter that Arneson was working on a final draft, and TSR began accepting preorders for the product and advertised it in The Strategic Review. The booklet was delivered late, in part by having gone through two editors (Brian Blume and Tim Kask) and being temporarily misplaced. The final edit was done hastily in a few weeks. The Blackmoor expansion was published by TSR, Inc. in 1975 as a sixty-page, digest-sized book. It was the second supplement to the original Dungeons & Dragons boxed set and bears the designation "Supplement II," with Gygax's Greyhawk preceding it in the same year.

The book features illustrations by David C. Sutherland III, Mike Bell, and Tracy Lesch. The supplement was edited by Tim Kask, who also did development on it.

The Temple of the Frog was revised and expanded years later, and published as DA2 Temple of the Frog.

The Blackmoor supplement was reproduced as a premium reprint on November 19, 2013, as part of a deluxe reprint of the original "White Box" which features new packaging in an oaken box. The reprint includes: Volume 1: Men & Magic, Volume 2: Monsters & Treasure, and Volume 3: Underworld & Wilderness Adventures plus four supplements: Supplement I: Greyhawk, Supplement II: Blackmoor, Supplement III: Eldritch Wizardry, and Supplement IV: Gods, Demi-Gods & Heroes. Each booklet comes with new cover art but otherwise reproduces the original content faithfully, including original interior art.

== Reviews ==
- The Playboy Winner's Guide to Board Games
