= Playboy Enterprises, Inc. v. Starware Publishing Corp. =

- Court: United States District Court for S.D. Florida, 11th Circuit
- Full case name: Playboy Enterprises, Inc. v. Starware Publishing Corp., and D. Andrew Kasanicky, Defendants., U.S. District Court, SD Florida, Case No. 94-6475-CIV.
- Decided: May 8, 1995

Court membership
- Judges sitting: Kenneth L. Ryskamp, United States District Judge.

Playboy Enterprises, Inc. v. Starware Publishing Corp. 900 F.Supp. 433 was a case heard before the United States District Court for the Southern District of Florida in May 1995. The case revolved around the subject of copyright infringement and exclusive rights in copyrighted works. Plaintiff Playboy Enterprises filed a motion for partial summary judgment of liability of copyright infringement against defendant Starware Publishing Corporation. Specifically, Playboy Enterprises ("PEI") argued that Starware's distribution of 53 of Playboy's images, taken from an online bulletin board, and then sold on a CD-ROM, infringed upon PEI's copyrights. The case affirmed that it was copyright infringement, granting Playboy Enterprises the partial summary judgment. Most importantly, the case established that "The copyright owner need not prove knowledge or intent on the part of the defendant to establish liability for direct copyright infringement."

== Background ==
The plaintiff, Playboy Enterprises, is a privately held global media and lifestyle company founded by Hugh Marston Hefner to manage the Playboy Magazine empire. Its content and programming is available, worldwide, on television networks, websites, mobile platforms, and the radio. The defendants, Starware Publishing Corp., is profit corporation based in South Florida, which sells multimedia. PEI's motion was filed on November 2, 1994, and defendant Starware filed its opposition on November 18, 1994.

== Facts ==
Starware distributed and sold approximately 9,611 copies of a CD-ROM entitled "Private Pictures I" in the United States. It downloaded these pictures from an online bulletin board and then burned them onto the CDs. Playboy Enterprises submitted a Concise Statement of Undisputed Facts in support of its motion and shared the original photographs in question. PEI also provided registration certificates issued by the United States Copyright Office for each of the 53 photographs. Starware relied only on its assertions that PEI might not be the owner of photographs/copyright work at issue, and that the works were not copyrightable. The photos submitted by Playboy Enterprises were strikingly similar to the ones found in "Private Pictures I." This allowed the Court to conclude that all infringing images on the CD-ROM were in fact copies of the Playboy photographs at issue.

Starware did not dispute that the accused images were strikingly similar. Nor did it suggest that the ultimate source for its accused images was anything other than the PEI photographs. Nor did it obtain permission from PEI to use the photos in question.

The plaintiffs moved for a partial summary judgment and argued that they had a valid copyright to the material which the defendants had distributed through CD-ROMs. The defendant, Starware alleged that a "substantial number" of copyright registrations asserted by Playboy Enterprises are for "collective works" and that it was not liable for infringement of these works because PEI might not own the underlying photographs at question.

== Court decision ==
The decision, authored by Judge Kenneth Ryskamp, granted Playboy Enterprises partial summary judgment on its claim against Starware for infringement of the 53 copyrighted photographs, in addition to an award of $1.1 million. This was based on two key aspects of the case. First, the court sought to determine if the case was one of copyright infringement, where the claimant must prove its ownership of the asserted copyrights and the defendant's "copying" of the original, or a "copy" of the copyrighted work. Because proving that the defendant had any knowledge or intent was not necessary for the copyright owner to establish liability for copyright infringement, the copyright registrations provided by Playboy Enterprises were prima facie evidence of the validity of the copyrights and the facts stated in the certificates, including ownership. Thus, this presumption by the Court shifted the burden to Starware Corp. to disprove the validity of the registration certificates.

Next, Starware Corp.'s allegation that a "substantial number" of copyright registrations asserted by Playboy Enterprises were for "collective works" and that the Corp. was therefore not liable for the infringement of these works because PEI might not own the underlying photographs. However, if a "collective work" is infringed if any copyrightable portion of the work, which is original to the copyright owner, is improperly copied by another. Furthermore, because Playboy Enterprise's Rights and Permissions director verified that each individual photograph (with one exception) was also copyrighted by PEI, Starware's claim was found to be without merit.

Secondly, the court examined whether the works were copied by Starware. Copying is normally shown by proving 1) access to the copyrighted work and 2) Substantial similarity between the copyrighted work and the accused work. It can also be shown by proving a "striking similarity" between the copyrighted work and the accused work, where proof of access is absent. In this case, the defendant already admitted that the CD-ROMs with the photographs were widely distributed throughout the United States. In terms of proving whether the defendant had access to the copyrighted work, the distribution of Playboy Magazines throughout the country and technically accessible to any adult would also allow for access to photographs published therein. Additionally, it was also determined that the accused images were more than "strikingly similar"—they were "virtually exact copies."

Finally, the second part of the two part test for "copying" involved determining whether the defendant, Starware Corp. used the photographs in any of the ways described in Section 106 of the Copyright Statute.

== U.S.C. Section 106: Exclusive rights in copyrighted works ==
This section the US Copyright Statute states that the owner of copyright under this title has the exclusive rights to do and authorize the following:

1. to reproduce the copyrighted work in copies or phonorecords
2. to prepare derivative works based upon the copyrighted work
3. to distribute copies or phonorecords of the copyrighted work to the public by sale or other transfer of ownership, or by

rental, lease, or lending;

1. in the case of literary, musical, dramatic, and choreographic works, pantomimes, and motion pictures and other audiovisual works, to perform the copyrighted work publicly;
2. in the case of literary, musical, dramatic, and choreographic works, pantomimes, and pictorial, graphic, or sculptural works, including the individual images of a motion picture or other audiovisual work, to display the copyrighted work publicly; and
3. in the case of sound recordings, to perform the copyrighted work publicly by means of a digital audio transmission.

The first and third rights particularly applied here because if a copyrighted work was used by the defendant in any of those ways, without permission of the copyright owner, it would constitute actionable copyright infringement. Specifically in terms of this case, Starware Corp. distributing nearly 10,000 copies of the CD-ROM disks containing the unauthorized photographs, violated Playboy Enterprise's exclusive right of production, under 17 U.S.C. § 106(1). Moreover, 17 U.S.C. § 106(3), the exclusive right to distribute the works was also violated here as the CDs were widely sold and distributed.

== See also ==
- Copyright law
  - Copyright infringement
