= Dungeons & Dragons retro-clones =

Tabletop role-playing game systems

Dungeons & Dragons retro-clones are fantasy role-playing games that emulate earlier editions of Dungeons & Dragons (D&D) no longer supported by Wizards of the Coast. They are made possible by the release of later editions' rules in a System Reference Document under the terms of the Open Game License, which allow the use of much of the proprietary terminology of D&D that might otherwise collectively constitute copyright infringement. However, per the license, these games lack the brand names Dungeons & Dragons, D&D, and all the other trademarks associated with those brands.

== History ==
Some D&D fans prefer earlier editions, and new games address the perceived inability of newer editions to preserve the tone of classic D&D while fixing some of the perceived rules issues of older versions. Castles & Crusades is one example, using the unified d20 mechanic from 3rd edition while dropping what the developers perceived as complications (including feats, skills, and prestige classes).

Role-playing game publisher Matthew Finch was involved in the development of Castles & Crusades, serving as editor of the Player's Handbook, and was the initial author of OSRIC, which was afterward taken up by Stuart Marshall and released to the public in 2006 as a retro-clone of the first edition of Advanced Dungeons & Dragons (1977–1989). The release prompted another game designer, Daniel Proctor, to write and release Labyrinth Lord in 2007, a more complete retro-clone of the 1981 version of the Dungeons & Dragons Basic Set and its accompanying Expert Set. The following year, Finch announced the release of Swords & Wizardry, a retro-clone of the original Dungeons & Dragons game.

Many variants have appeared since the original release of OSRIC, as well as restatements of other editions of D&D and other adventure role-playing games. The games are fostered and supported online by various forums and blogs, sometimes collectively referred to as the Old School Renaissance (OSR), but are also increasingly finding their way into brick and mortar game stores.

== Retro-clone examples ==
=== OSRIC ===
OSRIC, short for Old School Reference and Index Compilation, is a recreation of the first edition of Advanced Dungeons & Dragons and one of the most successful retro-clones.

The first version of OSRIC was released in 2006. A second version, OSRIC v. 2.2, was released in 2013. A third edition, named OSRIC 3.0, was crowdfunded on BackerKit in 2025 and released the same year.

=== Labyrinth Lord ===
Labyrinth Lord (LL) is a retro-clone written and edited by Daniel Proctor and published by Goblinoid Games in 2007. LL takes its inspiration from the 1981 Basic Set edited by Tom Moldvay and the accompanying Expert Set by David "Zeb" Cook.

Any adventure written to be played with classic D&D can be run using LL with little or no adjustment. However, there are a few differences between the two games. It extends the rules so characters can advance to 20th level (the 1981 Expert Set only included levels up to 14). In addition, in a nod to Advanced Dungeons & Dragons, clerics receive spells at first level.

=== Basic Fantasy RPG ===
Basic Fantasy is a retro-clone written by Chris Gonnerman that emulates and is largely compatible with the 1981 Basic and Expert sets. Its differences from B/X D&D include d20-style ascending armor class and separation of character race and class. It was first released in 2007, and updated in 2008, 2014, and 2023. The game has been positively received.

=== Swords & Wizardry ===
Swords & Wizardry
- Designers: Matthew Finch
- Publishers: Mythmere Games via Frog God Games
- Publication: 2008
- Years active: 2008–present
- Genres: Fantasy
- Playing time: Varies
- Chance: Dice rolling
- Skills: Role-playing, improvisation, tactics, arithmetic
- Website: www.mythmeregames.com/collections/swords-wizardry

Swords & Wizardry (S&W), developed by Mythmere Games, emulates the original 1974 edition of Dungeons & Dragons. Swords & Wizardry won the Silver for the 2009 ENnie Award for Best Free Product.

There are three different versions of the game available.

- White Box, a streamlined game emulating the rules and options of just the original 1974 boxed set without expansions, creating a play style omitting many elements that were later introduced to D&D.
- Core, which uses some expanded rules to include most classic game elements.
- Complete, including nearly all of the rules and options added to the original game from supplements and articles.

=== Dark Dungeons ===
Dark Dungeons
- Designers: "Blacky the Blackball"
- Publishers: Self-published
- Publication: 2010
- Years active: 2010–present
- Genres: Fantasy
- Playing time: Varies
- Chance: Dice rolling
- Skills: Role-playing, improvisation, tactics, arithmetic
- Website: gurbintrollgames.wordpress.com/dark-dungeons/

Dark Dungeons has as its primary inspiration the 1991 Dungeons & Dragons Rules Cyclopedia, with secondary inspiration (particularly for the cosmology of the default game setting) coming from the 1989 Spelljammer campaign setting. The name Dark Dungeons and the names of the sample characters (and their players) found in examples throughout the text are used in parody of the Chick Tract of the same name.

Because Dark Dungeons emulates the Dungeons & Dragons Rules Cyclopedia, which itself contains collected and edited rules from the Basic, Expert, Companion, and Master sets published from 1983–1985, it is compatible with most adventures and supplements designed for those sets. However, while Dark Dungeons does include rules for immortal level play, those rules are inspired by the 1993 Wrath of the Immortals supplement to the Rules Cyclopedia and are not compatible with adventures and supplements designed for the 1985 Immortals Set.

=== Mazes & Perils ===
Mazes & Perils
- Designers: Vincent Florio
- Publishers: Wild Games Productions
- Publication: 2011; 2015 Deluxe Edition
- Years active: 2011–present
- Genres: Fantasy
- Playing time: Varies
- Chance: Dice rolling
- Skills: Role-playing, improvisation, tactics, arithmetic
- Website: www.drivethrurpg.com/product/181899/Mazes--Perils-Deluxe-Edition

Mazes & Perils RPG (M&P) is a retro-clone developed by Wild Games Productions, emulating the 1977 version of the Basic Set edited by John Eric Holmes. M&P expands the game from its original level limit of level 3 up to level 12. It won the 2013 ENnie Award for Best Free Game. An expanded Deluxe Edition featuring new classes was released in 2015.

=== For Gold & Glory ===
For Gold & Glory
- Designers: Justen Brown & Moses Wildermuth
- Publishers: Self-published
- Publication: 2012
- Years active: 2012–present
- Genres: Fantasy
- Playing time: Varies
- Chance: Dice rolling
- Skills: Role-playing, improvisation, tactics, arithmetic

For Gold & Glory is a retro-clone of the AD&D 2nd edition rules from 1989. It was first published in 2012, and was written by Justen Brown and edited by Moses Wildermuth. It is available as a free download or as a print-on-demand book.

=== Blueholme ===
Blueholme
- Designers: Michael Thomas
- Publishers: Dreamscape Design
- Publication: 2013
- Years active: 2013–present
- Genres: Fantasy
- Playing time: Varies
- Chance: Dice rolling
- Skills: Role-playing, improvisation, tactics, arithmetic

Blueholme is a retro-clone of the 1977 version of the Basic Set edited by John Eric Holmes. The Blueholme Prentice Rules, covering 1st to 3rd-level play, were first published in January 2013 by Michael Thomas of Dreamscape Design. They are available as a pay-what-you-want download or as a print-on-demand book. The Prentice Rules won the joint runner-up place in the 2014 Indie RPG Awards.

There are two expanded versions in production: the Journeymanne Rules which cover play from 1st through 20th level, and the Compleat Rules which also incorporate additional sub-classes and creatures.

=== Old-School Essentials ===
Old-School Essentials
- Designers: Gavin Norman
- Publishers: Necrotic Gnome
- Publication: 2018 B/X Essentials; 2019 Classic Fantasy; 2020 Advanced Fantasy
- Years active: 2018–present
- Genres: Fantasy
- Playing time: Varies
- Chance: Dice rolling
- Skills: Role-playing, improvisation, tactics, arithmetic
- Website: http://www.necroticgnome.com/

Originally called B/X Essentials, Old-School Essentials is a clone of the 1981 Dungeons & Dragons Basic and Expert sets (aka B/X) edited by Tom Moldvay and David "Zeb" Cook respectively. The intended features of this retro-clone are 100% faithfulness and compatibility with the original rules it emulates; brevity; clarity; and meticulous organization and indexing. As of 2020, Old-School Essentials comes in two versions: "Classic Fantasy" and "Advanced Fantasy," with "Advanced Fantasy" including B/X compatible material inspired by the first edition of Advanced Dungeons & Dragons. Old-School Essentials is unique in that both versions come in two different formats: All-in-one (or two) rules tomes or modular multi-book sets.
