= HackMaster =

Tabletop fantasy role-playing game

- 4th edition Player's Handbook cover
- Designers: Jolly R. Blackburn, David Kenzer, et al.
- Publishers: Kenzer & Company
- Publication: 2001 (4th Edition); 2009 (Basic); 2011 (5th Edition)
- Genres: fantasy
- Systems: Custom, derived from AD&D system
- Spun off from the Knights of the Dinner Table comic strip

HackMaster is a fantasy role-playing game produced by Kenzer & Company. It began as a fictional game, a parody of Dungeons & Dragons played by the characters of the Knights of the Dinner Table comic strip by Jolly R. Blackburn. The characters in the comic began playing fictional HackMaster 3rd Edition, which was updated and published in 2001 as a numerously revised 4th edition. It has been hinted the name of the game was originally changed for copyright reasons.

The current 5th edition has removed most of the parody aspects, and contains game mechanics written from scratch in order to avoid any intellectual property problems.

== Publication history ==
Kenzer & Company received many requests from fans of the comic to produce an actual HackMaster game, but initially they thought that licensing Dungeons & Dragons would be impossible. In 1999 the Dragon Magazine Archive software was published where Wizards of the Coast failed to get permission to reprint many of the original articles such as the Knights of the Dinner Table comic in the electronic media archive. A contract dispute was settled out of court, they reached an agreement about creating a derivative work, that led to K&C's publication of HackMaster 4th Edition in 2001. As a nod to the fictional version from the comic, this first edition of HackMaster was published as the 4th Edition.

Since its release in 2001, HackMaster has evolved into a full-fledged role-playing game, spawning over forty add-ons, supplements and game aids. Most notable products include a 32-panel gamemaster's shield, a 16-page character sheet and a 10-volume monster encyclopedia. The Hacklopedia of Beasts, the HackMaster version of the Monster Manual, was next released as eight separate volumes. These books were somewhat optional as creature statistics from the 1st and 2nd edition versions of Advanced Dungeons & Dragons (AD&D) were compatible with HackMaster. K&C later released the Hacklopedia Field Manual, which contained new monsters and variants of popular monsters from the Hacklopedias. K&C also released the Hacklopedia of Beasts: Monster Matrix which contained rules to create new monster variants, along with various combined stat charts. In 2006 K&C released the Hacklopedia of Beasts: Rustlers of the Night as a collection of all the bonus monsters released in issues 58 through 120 of the Knights if the Dinner Table and previous HackMaster modules.

Whereas Wizards of the Coast overhauled the rules for 3rd edition D&D, Kenzer & Company took the opposite action by revising the AD&D First and Second Edition rules (including various supplements such as 1st Edition Unearthed Arcana and Oriental Adventures and the mid-1990s Skills & Powers supplements) into a more coherent system and adding an element of parody. In part of that ability to use AD&D rules, K&C was required to maintain a higher level of humor than in the Knights of the Dinner Table comic for products that are revised from previous AD&D material. Completely original works for HackMaster are not subject to this restriction imposed by Wizards of the Coast.

In 2002, HackMaster won the Origins Award for Game of the Year 2001.

The first rulebook for the new edition, HackMaster Basic, was sent out to preorderers on June 19, 2009. HackMaster Basic was created due to Kenzer's licensing for AD&D running out. The title is a nod to the Dungeons and Dragons Basic Set, although HackMaster Basic was re-written so as to not contain any copyrighted material from Wizards of the Coast.

The game includes an official HackMaster Player's Handbook, an alternate campaign setting changed from Garweeze Wurld to Kingdoms of Kalamar, a comprehensive, one-volume bestiary called the Hacklopedia of Beasts, and a GM's guide. Also provided are a pantheon of gods and attendant rituals and spells for the cleric class to choose from.

== Mechanics ==
Some of the game rule changes include a count-up system, as opposed to a "combat round" type of in-game time-keeping method. Players plan their actions second-by-second, with little or no down time between actions. Player characters in combat actively defend as well as attack and various combat maneuvers are offered to create a more realistic feel to the hostile encounter. The magic system has been overhauled to use spell points rather than a fixed number of spells. Clerics are no longer a single class, but are specific to the various deities within the pantheon.

== Setting ==
In 4th edition, the official setting of HackMaster was Garweeze Wurld, a giant continent on the planet Aldrazar based on the notes of Jolly Blackburn. This has been developed in the Garweeze Wurld Atlas and Garweeze Wurld Gazetteer. Garweeze Wurld is about eight thousand miles across, circling much of the northern hemisphere of its planet. The continent is mapped based on forty-eight "sectors", each one thousand miles across. The continent reaches from the tropical band of Aldrazar to its Arctic Circle. The name Garweeze Wurld was a play on the name of the fictional creator of HackMaster in Knights of the Dinner Table, Gary Jackson, who is himself a parody of both D&D co-creator Gary Gygax and Steve Jackson of Steve Jackson Games.

In the 5th edition of the game, the setting has been switched to Kenzerco's "Kingdoms of Kalamar" (KoK) setting. KoK was originally developed as a D&D setting, and has been detailed in several supplements and adventures. Developers for Kenzerco have stated on their forums that the world will not be significantly altered for HM 5th.

== Adventure modules ==
The following premade adventures were published for both 4th and 5th edition of the game. Most of the 4th edition adventures are parody and alteration of the TSR era D&D modules.

=== 4th Edition ===
- B1: Quest for the Unknown, Character levels 1-3
- B2: Little Keep on the Borderlands, Character levels 1-4
- C1: The Hidden Shrine, Character levels 4-6
- C2: Demon Tower of Madness, Character levels 5-7
- C4: The Prophecy of Shardar, Character levels 4-7
- D1-2: Descent Into the NetherDeep, Character levels 9-12
- G1-3: Annihilate the Giants, Character levels 7-11
- I2: Crypt of the Lizard King, Character levels 5-7
- K1: Slaughterhouse Indigo, Character levels 4-6
- S1: Tomb of Unspeakable Horrors, Character levels 10-14
- S4: Lost Caverns, Character levels 6-10
- S5: Dead Gawd's Hand, Character levels 4-7
- S6: Isle of Death, Character levels 5-8
- T1-4: The Temple of Existential Evil, Character levels 1 and up
- UK1: Porpher's Enchanted Garden, Character levels 3-5
- Road to Aster, Character levels 5-7
- R1: Robinloft, Character levels 5-7
- R2: Robinloft 2: Tahd's Legacy, Character levels 8-10
- Smackdown the Slavers, Character levels 4-7
- White Doom Mountain, Character levels 4-7
- Sir Robilar's City of Brass, Character levels 7 and up

=== 5th Edition (Basic & Advanced) ===
- Vidar's Final Trek (PDF)
- The Gift (PDF)
- Moor's Caw (PDF)
- Sheep Thief (PDF)
- Raktavira's Villa (PDF)
- The Forgotten Monastery
- The Brindonwood Syndrome
- The Prodigal Sons (PDF)
- Shadow Over Tiwidu
- In the Dark of Fright
- Strangers on the Trail
- Tiwidu: Village on the Verge
- Legacy of the Elm King
- Baurgar's Prize (PDF)
- Frandor's Keep (PDF)
- The Gauntlet (PDF)
- The Secret of Blackgate Farm (PDF)
- A Sewer Runs Through It (PDF)
- Mugful of Mayhem (PDF)
- Dusk of the Dead (PDF)
- Nest of the RatMaster (PDF)
- Plague of Cosolen (PDF)
- In the Realm of the Elm King (PDF)
- The Temple of Unrelenting Despair (PDF)
- Wrath of the Vohven (PDF)
- Mysterious Shrine (PDF)
- White Palette, Ivory Horns (PDF)
- Isle of Red (PDF)
