= Greenberg v. National Geographic =

Copyright lawsuit

Greenberg v. National Geographic was a copyright lawsuit regarding image use and republication rights of National Geographic Society to their magazine in electronic form.

== Details ==
After the National Geographic released a digital archive containing all monthly issues of National Geographic magazine in 1997, photographer Jerry Greenberg took the Society to court over the reproduction of photographs that National Geographic had licensed from him. National Geographic withdrew this archive from the market in 2004 until after litigation was finished. The archive, called "The Complete National Geographic on CD-ROM and DVD", contained image duplicates of the print magazines. National Geographic argued that the archive was a "revision", and thus National Geographic held the license to republish. The plaintiff argued that the archive, which included an introductory sequence set to music and a search feature, was a new work.

== Rulings ==
Two federal appellate courts made rulings on the cases. In 2001, the United States Court of Appeals for the Eleventh Circuit ruled against National Geographic, before a ruling in a similar case later in the year in the U.S. Supreme Court, in respect to the same U.S. Copyright law statute, New York Times Co. v. Tasini.

On March 4, 2005, the United States Court of Appeals for the Second Circuit said that Greenberg was inconsistent with the Supreme Court ruling in Tasini, and ruled in favor of National Geographic in another case regarding the Complete National Geographic product (Faulkner v. National Geographic Enterprises).

On June 13, 2007, the Eleventh Circuit reversed its prior decision in Greenberg I and remanded the case back to the U.S. district court, agreeing with the Second Circuit ruling in Faulkner that Greenberg I was inconsistent with the later Tasini decision (Greenberg II).

On August 30, 2007, the Eleventh Circuit issued an order vacating the panel decision in Greenberg II and said the Court would hear the appeal en banc, or by all the judges on the Court, which was heard February 26, 2008.

On June 30, 2008, the Eleventh Circuit held (Greenberg III) that National Geographic's reproduction of its magazine electronically was privileged under the federal copyright statute.

== Results ==
Since National Geographic's victory in the Second Circuit, several publications (including The New Yorker, Playboy, Atlantic Monthly, Mad Magazine, and Rolling Stone) have either produced or announced plans to produce complete reproductions of their prior paper magazines on DVD or a restricted website for subscribers.

As a result of this ruling National Geographic announced it is releasing the full 120-year version of its magazine at the end of October 2009.
