= Gods, Demi-Gods & Heroes =

Tabletop role-playing game supplement for Dungeons & Dragons

Gods, Demi-Gods & Heroes (Supplement IV)
- Authors: Robert Kuntz and James M. Ward
- Language: English
- Genre: Role-playing game
- Publisher: TSR, Inc.
- Publication date: 1976
- Media type: Print (Softcover)
- Pages: 72

Gods, Demi-Gods & Heroes is a supplementary rulebook for the Dungeons & Dragons (D&D) fantasy role-playing game. Its product designation is TSR 2006.

== Contents ==
The work provides information on the pantheons and constructs of the Egyptian, Hindu, Greek, Celtic, Norse, Finnish, Aztec, Maya, and Chinese, as well as Robert E. Howard's Hyborea and the Melnibonéan Mythos from Michael Moorcock's Elric novels. The book was intended to adapt the various constructs for D&D gameplay, and is therefore not a general reference source regarding the underlying mythos.

The supplement intends to set guidelines to enable Dungeon Masters to incorporate mythologies of various real-world cultures and other sources into their own campaigns.

== Publication history ==
Gods, Demi-Gods & Heroes was written by Robert Kuntz and James Ward, and published by TSR in 1976 as a seventy two page digest sized book; it was the fourth supplement to the original D&D rules. The booklet was edited by Tim Kask, and published by TSR, Inc. in 1976 for the original edition of D&D, and bears the designation "Supplement IV", following the first three supplements, Greyhawk, Blackmoor, and Eldritch Wizardry. In later editions of the game, the Deities & Demigods sourcebook superseded this volume, building upon the gameplay structures first introduced in Gods, Demi-gods, and Heroes.

The Gods, Demi-Gods & Heroes supplement was reproduced as a premium reprint on November 19, 2013, as part of a deluxe reprint of the original version of the "White Box" and other early supplements for the game, which features new packaging in an oaken box. Each of the seven booklets in the box comes with new cover art but is otherwise presented as a faithful reproduction of the original product, with its original interior art. The reproduction of "Gods, Demi-Gods & Heroes" omitted sections on Robert E. Howard's Hyborea and the Melnibonéan Mythos from Michael Moorcock's Elric novels, which in the original publication had drawn fire from Moorcock and the Howard estate for unauthorized copyright violations.

== Reception ==
Glen Taylor reviewed Gods, Demi-Gods and Heroes in The Space Gamer No. 9. He states that as "the fourth and purportedly last supplement to Dungeons and Dragons" it "might be expected from such a 'last bow,' as it were, this newest supplement is different from all three of the previous ones, in a major way. [...] This is by no means 'standard' D&D material." He commented that "I'm no scholar of ancient (and modern!) legends, but it seems to me the authors have given a view of the various mythological concepts which is both panoramic and scrutinously details, and as complete as possible within the space limitations imposed [...] Kuntz and Ward have taken material which has come down to us in a sometimes distorted and almost always nebulous form, and clarified it into a solid material which would fit in well with any fantasy game." Taylor concludes his review by saying that Gods, Demi-Gods and Heroes is worth the price "for the mere pleasure of reading it. For students of ancient legends it's a Type I treasure. It should much lived up any D&D campaign in which it is used".

In his 1991 book Heroic Worlds, Lawrence Schick calls this book "the least important supplement to Original D&D".

David M. Ewalt, in his book Of Dice and Men, commented that "Even though Swords and Spells is numbered 'Supplement V' on its cover, it's really supplement IV that puts the final touches on Dungeons & Dragons. Gods, Demi-Gods & Heroes (co-authored by TSR's Rob Kuntz and James M. Ward, a gamer and junior high teacher from Prairie du Chien, Wisconsin) introduces mythology to the game and describes deities in the same manner earlier supplements described men and monsters." Ewalt continues: "At its heart, Gods, Demi-Gods & Heroes represents another attempt to exert control over D&D players. Kask's foreword drips with disdain for Dungeon Masters who allow their players to advance to high levels and explains that the supplement aims to correct their misguided actions".

== Reviews ==
- The Playboy Winner's Guide to Board Games
