= Little Wars (magazine) =

Miniature wargaming magazine

Little Wars was a miniature wargaming magazine produced by TSR from 1976 to 1978.

== History ==
TSR cancelled The Strategic Review after only seven issues in 1976, and replaced it with two magazines, Little Wars, which covered miniature wargaming, and The Dragon, which covered role playing games. After twelve issues, Little Wars ceased independent publication and issue 13 was published as part of The Dragon issue 22.
