= Old-School Essentials =

Tabletop role-playing game

- Cover art by Andrew Walters
- Designers: Gavin Norman
- Illustrators: Peter Mullen
- Publishers: Necrotic Gnome
- Publication: 2019
- Genres: Fantasy role-playing game

Old-School Essentials, subtitled "Retro Adventure Game", is a line of books released by the indie publisher Necrotic Gnome in 2019 that is a restatement of the Basic and Expert Sets produced for Dungeons & Dragons by TSR in 1981.

== Description ==
RPG historian Stu Horvath noted how disorganized the original Basic and Expert (B/X) D&D rules were, pointing out that to create an Elf character required flipping between four different pages just to consult the basic character rules, with more page turning required to set up the character's spellcasting abilities.

Old-School Essentials is a retroclone that does not try to change the spirit of the original B/X rules but does try to make the rules easier to read. The first five Old-School Essentials books — Core Rules, Genre Rules, Cleric and Magic-User Spells, Monsters, and Treasures — re-organize all of the original rules into a much more logical and streamlined order. For example, all of the information for creating an Elf character is now contained in a single two-page spread. None of the original rules are changed, merely re-organized. A few clarifications of ambiguous rules are included, as well as an optional rule to use ascending armor class rather than the classic THAC0 rule.

A second line of books titled Advanced Fantasy Expansion sets out rules to allow material from Advanced Dungeons & Dragons to be used.

== Publication history ==
The B/X rules, written by Tom Moldvay, were published by TSR in 1981 to codify the original edition of D&D that had been published in 1974, and also to make the game more accessible to newcomers. As part of the Old School Renaissance, Gavin Norman re-organized Moldvay's rules, which was subsequently published by Necrotic Gnome in 2019 as Old School Expansion, a collection of five books that could be bought individually or as a boxed set. A large number of supplements and adventures have followed.

== Reception ==
Writing for Dicebreaker, Maddire Cullen found the "old school" rules for D&D liberating to some extent compared to the modern Fifth Edition. "Old-School Essentials is all about [using] fun and cinematic ideas. Maybe you did successfully cut the bandit's sword hand off; outmanoeuvred, they flee the fight ... The DM can have fun with outcomes the same way players can; you're all deciding in the moment what cool thing might happen next." But Cullen warned that without pregenerated skills and feats to fall back on, "This all immerses you in the fantastical world that you’re inhabiting, but it definitely takes a while to get used to putting your character sheet aside and delving into your imagination instead." Cullen concluded, "I never thought OSE would enter my favourites list, but here I am, trying to get everyone I can to have some old-school fantasy adventures."

Panayiotis Lines, writing for Leyline Press, called this "an incredibly faithful recreation of the Basic & Expert rules, attempting to meticulously recreate them not just in spirit but in gameable practice." Lines also noted, "OSE couples this faithfulness to the B/X rules set with an incredible layout that makes it quick and simple to look up anything that you need to during play." Line concluded, "Overall Old School Essentials comes as one of the most highly recommended of all the D&D retro clones on the market. It goes beyond being a product of nostalgia into an incredibly tight and functional system with a wide range of support by its creator as well as its dedicated community that makes it as engaging for modern audiences as any other system out there whilst still having that spark of magic that birthed the entire RPG hobby."

Matt Thrower called this "a poster child for what's known as the Old School Renaissance." Thrower noted that this was a "restatement" of the old B/X rules, saying, "There is nothing new here at all, just the previous text carefully combed and untangled of contradictions and confusions. It is presented in clean, clear pages full of classic art and easy to reference tables." Although Thrower's test game party were sometimes annoyed by the lack of uniformity of the rules — "Sometimes you’re aiming to roll above a target number, sometimes below" — they all liked the move from using skills and feats to using their imaginations, resulting in a game that is "based on good play instead of rolling dice."

Daniel Stack called OSE "one of the best-edited games I’ve read. It is well organized, well-written, and very concise. It reconciles many of the ambiguities and contradictions found in earlier versions of D&D." Stack also noted "Old-School Essentials is full of options. These options are not a scattering of special cases and optional rules but rather well-thought-out ways of adjusting the rules." Stack concluded, "If you’re looking for an excellent presentation of the D&D game of the early 1980s, centered around the B/X rules with a strong touch of AD&D, the answer is a definitive yes ... Finding anything you might be looking for is easy, and the rules are consistent and concise."

In his 2023 book Monsters, Aliens, and Holes in the Ground, RPG historian Stu Horvath commented "This is a work of extensive renovation. The [original B/X] rules are buffed, polished, and streamlined to the point that it is difficult to see the original ... the refinement is so total that the result feels like a whole new game." Horvath concluded, "No other set of rules, including the current iteration of Dungeons & Dragons, is so clear or easy to reference."
