= Old School Renaissance =

Play-style movement in the tabletop role-playing game hobbyist community

The Old School Renaissance, Old School Revival, or OSR is a play style movement in tabletop role-playing games which draws inspiration from the earliest days of tabletop RPGs in the 1970s, especially Dungeons & Dragons. Today it consists of a loose network or community of gamers and game designers who share an interest in a certain style of play and set of game design principles.

== Terminology ==
The terms "old school revival" and "old school renaissance" were first used on the Dragonsfoot forum as early as 2004 and 2005, respectively, to refer to a growing interest in older editions of Dungeons and Dragons and games inspired by those older editions. By February 2008, a pre-launch call for submissions for Fight On! magazine described it as "a quarterly fanzine for the old-school Renaissance". The two terms (revival and renaissance) continue to be used interchangeably according to user preference, though a 2018 survey found that most respondents understood the R in OSR to mean "renaissance" over "revival", with "rules" and "revolution" as distant third- and fourth-place choices. Ben Milton describes the use of "Revival" as a return to older role-playing games, and "Renaissance" as taking inspiration from the kinds of play they engendered.

== History ==
The OSR movement grew out of a surviving player base dedicated to older, superseded and out of print editions of Dungeons & Dragons (primarily 1st edition) who were not interested in then-current 3rd edition D&D. In the early 2000s, games were released that were aimed at this older player base—2001's HackMaster and 2004's Castles & Crusades—alongside third-party products created by Necromancer Games for 3rd edition D&D but advertised as having an "old-school feel". A sense that these pre-OSR retro-style products did not entirely provide what the player base desired led to discussion on internet forums such as "Dragonsfoot", "Knights & Knaves Alehouse", and "Original D&D Discussion" concerning the use of Wizard of the Coast's recently released Open Gaming License (OGL). The license permitted independent creators to make new material using many of the concepts previously prohibited from public use, in turn allowing the public to create material that more closely hewed to older rules of D&D.

This interest in and discussion of "old school" play led to the first OSR games separate from the original versions of D&D, created by independent publishers. These were Dungeons and Dragons retro-clones (legal emulations of D&D rules from the 1970s and early 1980s, created via the OGL), the most notable of which were BFRPG (2006), OSRIC (2006), Labyrinth Lord (2007), and Swords & Wizardry (2008), developed in whole or in part on the above forums. Zines dedicated to OSR content, such as Fight On! and Knockspell, began to be published as early as 2008, and soon the discussion was expanded on a large and diverse network of blogs.

Starting in 2006, hundreds of new, independently produced support products were created for these new games. In 2008, Matthew Finch (creator of OSRIC) released his free "Quick Primer for Old School Gaming", which tried to sum up the OSR aesthetic. In 2008 and 2009, sites such as Lulu and DriveThruRPG began allowing authors to tag their periodicals as "OSR" if desired and sell them as print-on-demand items. New games were released over time, notably Lamentations of the Flame Princess (2010), an exploration of weird fiction themes set during the early modern period that began to publish a large number of independent authors under its umbrella, and Old-School Essentials (2019), a retroclone of the 1981 Basic and Expert rulesets.

In 2012, Wizards of the Coast began publishing reprints and PDFs of Advanced Dungeons and Dragons and Dungeons and Dragons Basic Set materials, possibly in response to a perceived market for these materials driven by the OSR.

By the early 2020s, the OSR had inspired such diverse developments in tabletop gaming that new classifications such as "BrOSR", "Classic OSR", "OSR-Adjacent", "Nu-OSR/NSR" and "Commercial OSR" were being used.

== Games ==
A variety of published RPGs can be understood to be influenced by or part of the OSR trend, ranging from emulations of specific editions of Dungeons and Dragons such as OSRIC, Old-School Essentials, and Labyrinth Lord to games such as The Black Hack, Mörk Borg, and Electric Bastionland, which are designed to recreate the "feel" of 1970s roleplaying while taking only slight (if any) inspiration from the early rules.

== Style of play ==
Broadly, OSR games encourage a tonal fidelity to early editions of Dungeons & Dragons—less emphasis on predefined endings, and a greater emphasis on player choice determining the fate of characters. OSR Games provide play where wrong decisions can easily become lethal for characters and do not guarantee satisfying endings to character arcs. Characters live and die by player choice as opposed to the story's needs.

Matthew Finch, in his 2008 book A Quick Primer for Old School Gaming, sets out the four pillars of OSR:

1. Rulings from the gamemaster are more important than rule books. Concoct a clever plan and let the gamemaster rule on it.
2. Player skill is more important than character abilities. Outwit the enemy, do not simply out-fight them.
3. Emphasize the heroic, not the superheroic. Success lies in experience, not superpowers.
4. Game balance is not important. If the characters meet a more powerful opponent, either think of a clever plan or run away.

== See also ==
- Dungeons & Dragons retro-clones
- History of role-playing games
