= Dungeons & Dragons (1974) =

Tabletop role-playing game

- The original Dungeons & Dragons set
- Authors: Gary Gygax; Dave Arneson
- Genre: Role-playing game
- Publisher: TSR, Inc.
- Publication date: 1974
- Media type: Boxed set

The original Dungeons & Dragons (commonly abbreviated D&D or OD&D) boxed set by Gary Gygax and Dave Arneson was published by Tactical Studies Rules in 1974. It included the original edition of the Dungeons & Dragons fantasy role-playing game. Its product designation was TSR 2002.

== Contents ==
The original Dungeons & Dragons boxed set was the first published role-playing game, a fantasy game system modeled on medieval Europe. This set introduced elements that became standard in later editions, including abilities (such as strength, intelligence, and dexterity); character classes (fighting-man, magic-user, cleric) and character levels; races (human, dwarf, elf, halfling); armor class; monsters and treasure; underground dungeons consisting of halls, rooms, and doors protected by tricks and traps; and magic items, such as intelligent swords. The set also presents rules for travelling through the wilderness by land and sea, hiring specialists as well as men-at-arms, constructing fortifications and establishing baronies. The set defines movement rates and areas are using inches, like that of the miniatures rules from which the system descended.

The set also included brief guidelines on how to use monsters as player characters.

This set features only a handful of the elements for which the game is known today: just three character classes (fighting-man, magic-user, and cleric); four races (human, dwarf, elf, hobbit); and only three alignments (lawful, neutral, and chaotic). The rules assume that players have owned and have played the miniatures wargame Chainmail and that they have used its measurement and combat systems. An optional combat system is included within the rules that later developed into the sole combat system of later versions of the game. In addition, the rules presumed ownership of Outdoor Survival, an Avalon Hill board game for outdoor exploration and adventure.

The Men & Magic booklet only recommends using miniatures "if the players have them available and so desire", because they were not a necessary component of the game and cardboard counters were instead suggested as an alternative.

The Monsters & Treasure booklet contains some of the first depictions of the game's most iconic monsters, many of which were adapted from mythology and various literary works.

The initial printing of the set referred to some of the creatures in the game as "hobbits" and "ents" after J. R. R. Tolkien's Middle-earth creatures, although after legal difficulties these names were changed to "halflings" and "treants", respectively.

== Publication history ==
The original Dungeons & Dragons set, subtitled Rules for Fantastic Medieval Wargames Campaigns Playable with Paper and Pencil and Miniature Figures, was written by Gary Gygax and Dave Arneson, and was published by TSR in 1974 as a digest-sized boxed set in a brown wood-grain box. The set included three digest-sized books: the 36-page "Volume 1: Men & Magic", the 40-page "Volume 2: Monsters & Treasure", and the 36-page "Volume 3: The Underworld & Wilderness Adventures". The set also included six reference sheets containing tables and charts. Advertisements for the game first started appearing in Spring 1974.

With a production budget of only $2000 to produce a thousand copies, the result was amateurish. Only $100 was budgeted for artwork, and Gygax pressed into service just about anyone who could hold a pencil, including local artist Cookie Corey; Greg Bell, a member of Jeff Perren's gaming group; D&D co-creator Dave Arneson; Gygax's wife's half-sister Keenan Powell; and fellow TSR co-founder Don Kaye. Each artist was paid $2 for a small piece or $3 for a larger piece, with an identical amount paid as a royalty every time another thousand copies were printed.

Several of Greg Bell's illustrations were based on comic book art, often from Strange Tales. The illustration of a sorcerer before a blazing cauldron in the second book is based on a panel from a Doctor Strange story in Strange Tales No. 167. The cover art showing a sword-wielding Viking warrior on a rearing horse was also copied from Strange Tales #167.

This first set went through many printings and was supplemented with several official additions, including Greyhawk and Blackmoor in 1975, and Eldritch Wizardry, Gods, Demi-Gods & Heroes, and Swords & Spells in 1976. Later printings, beginning in 1976, came in an all-white box, and added the label "Original Collector's Edition". The initial printing of the "Men & Magic" booklet had an illustration of a mounted warrior on the cover, while the 1976 printing featured a fighter with a sword.

The original Dungeons & Dragons was re-released in 2013, as part of a deluxe, premium collectors set which includes reprints of the original boxed set booklets and the first four supplement booklets in a wooden box. Each booklet comes with new cover art but is otherwise a faithful reproduction of the original, including original interior art.

== Reception ==
Tim Waddell reviewed the original Dungeons & Dragons in The Space Gamer #2. Waddell commented that "The most stimulating part of the game is the fact that anything can happen. Nothing is impossible." Andy Pudewa also reviewed the original Dungeons & Dragons in The Space Gamer #2. Pudewa said that "As a game, D&D is a fantastical outlet for the imagination. It has the quality of being infinitely flexible, and with it comes the reality of impossibility. [...] There are drawbacks to the game however; as there are in any game. D&D cannot even begin to get interesting in less than 20 hours playing time. Hundreds of hours of work must be done ahead of time by the referee, and it takes a fairly long time to prepare on the part of the players."

The set is an H.G. Wells award-winner.

On December 9, 2016, a first printing of the boxed set was sold on an eBay auction for over $20,000.

=== Awards ===
- Origins Awards (All-Time Best Role-Playing Rules, 1977)
- Origins Awards (Greatest Contribution to the Hobby 1967–77, 1977)
- Origins Awards (Adventure Gaming Hall of Fame, 1977)
- Strategists' Club Award (Best New Game, 1974)
- Pen & Paper (RPG Hall of Fame, 2002)
- Scrye Player's Choice (All-Time Favorite Role-Playing Game, 2006)
- Games Magazine (Hall of Fame, 1984).
