= Editions of Dungeons & Dragons =

Fantasy role-playing game history

Several different editions of the Dungeons & Dragons (D&D) fantasy role-playing game have been produced since 1974. The current publisher of D&D, Wizards of the Coast, produces new materials only for the most current edition of the game. However, many D&D fans continue to play older versions of the game, and some third-party companies continue to publish materials compatible with these older editions.

After the original edition of D&D was introduced in 1974, the game was split into two branches in 1977: the rules-light system of Dungeons & Dragons and the more complex, rules-heavy system of Advanced Dungeons & Dragons (AD&D). The standard game was eventually expanded into a series of five box sets by the mid-1980s before being compiled and slightly revised in 1991 as the Dungeons & Dragons Rules Cyclopedia. Meanwhile, the 2nd edition of AD&D was published in 1989. In 2000, the two-branch split was ended when a new version was designated the 3rd edition, but dropped the "Advanced" prefix to be called simply Dungeons & Dragons; a revision, called 3.5, was released in 2003. The 4th edition was published in 2008. The 5th edition was released in 2014. A revision of the 5th edition was published in 2024.

== Timeline ==
Dungeons & Dragons version history
1974	Dungeons & Dragons (original edition)	
1977	Advanced Dungeons & Dragons (1st edition)	Dungeons & Dragons Basic Set
1981	Advanced Dungeons & Dragons (1st edition)	Dungeons & Dragons (BX version)
1983	Advanced Dungeons & Dragons (1st edition)	Dungeons & Dragons (BECMI version)
1989	Advanced Dungeons & Dragons 2nd Edition	Dungeons & Dragons (BECMI version)
1991	Advanced Dungeons & Dragons 2nd Edition	Dungeons & Dragons Rules Cyclopedia
1995	Advanced Dungeons & Dragons (revised 2nd edition)	
2000	Dungeons & Dragons (3rd edition)	
2003	Dungeons & Dragons v.3.5	
2008	Dungeons & Dragons (4th edition)	
2010	Dungeons & Dragons (4th edition)	Dungeons & Dragons Essentials
2014	Dungeons & Dragons (5th edition)	
2024	Dungeons & Dragons (5.5e)	

== Version history ==
=== Original Dungeons & Dragons ===
The original D&D was published as a box set in 1974 and features only a handful of the elements for which the game is known today: just three character classes (fighting-man, magic-user, and cleric); four races (human, dwarf, elf, and hobbit); only a few monsters; only three alignments (lawful, neutral, and chaotic). With a production budget of only $2000 to print a thousand copies, the result has been described as amateurish.

Only $100 was budgeted for artwork, and TSR co-founder Gary Gygax pressed into service anyone who was willing to help, including local artist Cookie Corey; Greg Bell, a member of Jeff Perren's gaming group; D&D co-creator Dave Arneson; Gygax's wife's half-sister Keenan Powell; and fellow TSR co-founder Don Kaye. Each artist was paid $2 for a small piece or $3 for a larger piece, with an identical amount paid as a royalty every time another thousand copies were printed.

The rules assume that players own and play the miniatures wargame Chainmail and use its measurement and combat systems. An optional combat system is included within the rules that later developed into the sole combat system of later versions of the game. In addition, the rules presume ownership of Outdoor Survival, a board game by then-unaffiliated company Avalon Hill for outdoor exploration and adventure. D&D was a radically new gaming concept at the time, and it was difficult for players without prior tabletop wargaming experience to grasp the vague rules. The release of the Greyhawk supplement removed the game's dependency on the Chainmail rules, and made it much easier for new, non-wargaming players to grasp the concepts of play. It also inadvertently aided the growth of competing game publishers, since just about anyone who grasped the concepts behind the game could write smoother and easier-to-use rules systems and sell them to the growing D&D fanbase (Tunnels & Trolls being the first such).

Supplements such as Greyhawk, Blackmoor, Eldritch Wizardry and Gods, Demi-Gods & Heroes, published over the next two years, greatly expanded the rules, character classes, monsters and spells. For example, the original Greyhawk supplement introduced the thief class, and weapon damage varying by weapon (as opposed to character class). In addition, many additions and options were published in the magazines The Strategic Review and its successor, The Dragon.

=== Advanced Dungeons & Dragons ===
An updated version of D&D was released between 1977 and 1979 as Advanced Dungeons & Dragons (AD&D). The game rules were reorganized and re-codified across three hardcover rulebooks, compiled by Gary Gygax, incorporating the original D&D rules and many additions and revisions from supplements and magazine articles. The three core rulebooks are the Monster Manual (1977), the Player's Handbook (1978), and the Dungeon Master's Guide (1979). Major additions include classes from supplements like assassin, druid, monk, paladin, and thief, while bard, illusionist, and ranger, which had previously only appeared in magazine articles, were added to the core rulebooks. An alignment system with nine alignments (Note: The new alignments are Lawful Good, Lawful Neutral, Lawful Evil, Neutral Good, Neutral, Neutral Evil, Chaotic Good, Chaotic Neutral, and Chaotic Evil. They are organized in a three cell by three cell square grid in horizontal bands (Lawful, Neutral and Chaotic) and vertical bands (Good, Neutral and Evil).) is used, rather than the previous three-alignment system in the original D&D rules.

Later supplements for AD&D include Deities & Demigods (1980), Fiend Folio (another book of monsters produced semi-autonomously in the UK in 1981), Monster Manual II (1983), Oriental Adventures, Unearthed Arcana (1985), which mostly compiles material previously published in Dragon magazine, and others.

=== Dungeons & Dragons Basic Set and revisions ===
While AD&D was still in the works, TSR was approached by an outside writer and D&D enthusiast, John Eric Holmes, who offered to re-edit and rewrite the original rules into an introductory version of D&D. Although TSR was focused on AD&D at the time, the project was seen as a profitable enterprise and a way to direct new players to anticipate the release of the AD&D game. It was published in July 1977 as the Basic Set, which included a single booklet covering character levels 1 through 3, and also includes dice and a beginner's module. The booklet collects and organizes the rules from the original D&D boxed set and Greyhawk supplement and features a blue cover with artwork by David C. Sutherland III. The "blue booklet" explains the game's concepts and method of play in terms that made it accessible to new players not familiar with tabletop miniatures wargaming. Unusual features of this version include an alignment system of five alignments (Note: The five Alignments are Lawful Good, Chaotic Good, Neutral, Lawful Evil, and Chaotic Evil. There are class-based restrictions in which Clerics can not be Neutral and Thieves can not be Good.) as opposed to the three or nine alignments of the other versions. This Basic Set was very popular and allowed many to discover and experience the D&D game for the first time. Although the Basic Set is not fully compatible with AD&D, as some rules were simplified to make the game easier for new players to learn, players were expected to continue play beyond third level by moving on to the AD&D version.

Once AD&D had been released, the Basic Set saw a major revision in 1981 by Tom Moldvay. It was immediately followed by the release of an Expert Set written by David Cook, to accompany the Basic Set, extending it to levels 4 through 14, for players who preferred the simplified introductory ruleset. With this revision, the Basic rules became their own game, distinct both from original D&D and AD&D. The revised Basic booklet features new artwork with a red cover, and the Expert booklet has a blue cover.

Between 1983 and 1986 this system was revised and expanded by Frank Mentzer as a series of five boxed sets (nicknamed the BECMI system, after the first letters of the five sets). This included the Basic Rules (red cover, supporting levels 1 through 3), Expert Rules (blue cover, supporting levels 4 through 14), Companion Rules (green cover, supporting levels 15 through 25), and Master Rules (black cover, supporting levels 26 through 36). The Immortals Rules (gold cover) supported characters who had transcended to becoming Immortals. The player's characters would be converted to a new set of rules that supported Immortal levels 1 through 36, and would operate on an interplanar level.

This version was compiled and slightly revised by Aaron Allston in 1991 as the Rules Cyclopedia, a hardback book which includes all the sets except Immortals Rules (which was discontinued and replaced with the Wrath of the Immortals boxed set accessory). While the Rules Cyclopedia includes all information required to begin the game, a revised introductory boxed set, named The New Easy-to-Master Dungeons & Dragons Game (and nicknamed "the black box") was released at the same time. A final repackaging of the introductory set, titled The Classic Dungeons & Dragons Game was released in 1994. By the end of 1995, TSR ended its support for the line.

=== Advanced Dungeons & Dragons 2nd Edition ===
In 1987, a small team of designers at TSR led by David "Zeb" Cook began work on the second edition of the AD&D game, which would be completed almost two years later. In 1989, Advanced Dungeons & Dragons 2nd Edition was published, featuring new rules and character classes.

By the end of its first decade, AD&D had expanded to several rulebooks, including three collections of monsters (Monster Manual, Monster Manual II, Fiend Folio), and two books governing character skills in wilderness and underground settings. Gygax had already planned a second edition for the game, which would also have been an update of the rules, incorporating the material from Unearthed Arcana, Oriental Adventures, and numerous new innovations from Dragon magazine in the Player's Handbook and Dungeon Master's Guide and would have consolidated the Monster Manual, Monster Manual II and Fiend Folio into one volume. Initially, the 2nd edition was planned to consolidate the game, but more changes were made during development, while still aiming at backwards compatibility with 1st edition.

The release of AD&D 2nd Edition corresponded with important policy changes at TSR. An effort was made to remove aspects of the game which had attracted negative publicity, most notably the removal of all mention of demons and devils, although these fiendish monsters were renamed tanar'ri and baatezu, respectively. Moving away from the moral ambiguity of the 1st edition AD&D, the TSR staff eliminated character classes and races like the assassin and the half-orc, and stressed heroic roleplaying and player teamwork. The target age of the game was also lowered, with most 2nd edition products being aimed primarily at teenagers.

The game was again published as three core rulebooks which incorporated the expansions and revisions which had been published in various supplements over the previous decade. However, the Monster Manual was replaced by the Monstrous Compendium, a loose-leaf binder in which every monster is given a full page of information. It was the intention that packs of new monsters (often setting-specific) could be purchased and added to the binder without the expense or inconvenience of a separate book, allowing the book to be updated and customized as needed. This format proved highly susceptible to wear and tear, however, and presented difficulties in keeping alphabetic order when pages had been printed with monsters on each side. Subsequently, the loose leaf formatting was abandoned and the Compendium as a core book was replaced by single-volume hardcover Monstrous Manual in 1993, collecting popular monsters from the Compendium. The edition also greatly increases the power of dragons, in order to counter the impression of relative weakness of the game's titular monster.

Numerous mechanical changes were made to the game. The combat system was modified. The minimum number required to hit a target uses a mathematical formula in which the defender's armor class (AC) is subtracted from the attacker's THAC0 ("To Hit Armor Class '0'") number, a simplification of 1st edition's attack matrix tables that had appeared as an optional rule in the 1st edition DMG. Distances are based on in-game units (feet) rather than miniatures-board ones (inches). Critical hits are offered as optional rules.

Character creation is modified in many ways. Demi-human races are given higher level maximums to increase their long-term playability, though they are still restricted in terms of character class flexibility. Character classes are organized into four groups: warrior (fighter, paladin, ranger), wizard (mage, specialist wizard), priest (cleric, druid), and rogue (thief, bard). Assassins and monks were removed from the game as character classes, "magic-users" are renamed "mages", illusionists are made into a subtype of the wizard class, along with new classes specializing in the other schools of magic. Proficiencies are officially supported in the Player's Handbook and many supplements, rather than being an optional add-on. Psionics are no longer included in the Player's Handbook, though they later appeared in their own supplement.

Sales of Second Edition's core books were somewhat weaker than First Edition. Combined, the Player's Handbook and Dungeon Master's Guide sold over 400,000 copies in the first year of release, a solid hit, but their lifetime sales were not close to matching the huge success of First Edition. The reasons why are contested. Michael Witwer, a biographer of Gary Gygax, cited the lack of involvement of Gygax and the changes that attempted to avoid controversy. Ben Riggs writes that TSR insiders worried that the word "Advanced" in the title was scaring off interested newcomers into thinking the product was not for them, and more generally that players of First Edition could simply continue using their old books. Both Witwer and Riggs cite increasing competition from other role-playing games; First Edition was a trailblazer that had carved out an entirely new space, but many more tabletop role-playing games existed by 1989.

In 1995, TSR re-released the core rulebooks for 2nd Edition with new covers, art, and page layouts.

==== Player's Option series ====
A series of volumes labelled Player's Option, allowing for alternate rules systems and character options, as well as a Dungeon Master Option for high-level campaigns, were released shortly after the 1995 re-release of the core rulebooks for 2nd Edition. The books consist of:

- Player's Option: Combat & Tactics
- Player's Option: Skills & Powers
- Player's Option: Spells & Magic
- Dungeon Master Option: High-Level Campaigns

Some of the optional rules include the introduction of a point-based system, allowing players to select from a list of abilities within character classes and create more individualized characters, and a more tactical combat system that includes elements such as attacks of opportunity.

=== Dungeons & Dragons 3rd edition ===
A major revision of the AD&D rules was released in 2000, the first edition published entirely by Wizards of the Coast. As the Basic game had been discontinued some years earlier, and the more straightforward title was more marketable, the word "advanced" was dropped and the new edition was named just Dungeons & Dragons, but still officially referred to as 3rd edition (or 3E for short). It also served as the basis of a broader role-playing system designed around 20-sided dice, called the d20 System. Monte Cook, Jonathan Tweet, and Skip Williams all contributed to the 3rd edition Player's Handbook, Dungeon Master's Guide, and Monster Manual, and then each designer wrote one of the books based on those contributions. In a retrospective on the legacy of Dungeons & Dragons, academic Evan Torner commented that the aim of the designers was to "simplify and declutter the whole system" – "D&D 3e and 3.5e bear the influence of Eurogame-style elegant design: that the terminology and choices in the game should be immediately intelligible to all who might play it. Players understanding the game itself got more agency over their PCs' fate".

The d20 System uses a more unified mechanic than earlier editions, resolving nearly all actions with a d20 die roll plus appropriate modifiers. Modifiers based on ability scores follow a standardized formula. Saving throws are reduced from five categories based on forms of attack to three based on type of defense. Skills and the new system of feats are introduced replacing non-weapon proficiencies, to allow players to further customize their characters. The combat system is greatly expanded, adopting into the core system most of the optional movement and combat system of the 2nd edition Players Option: Combat and Tactics book. Third edition combat allows for a grid system, encouraging highly tactical gameplay and facilitating the use of miniatures. 3rd edition removes previous editions' restrictions on class and race combinations that were intended to track the preferences of the race, and on the level advancement of non-human characters.

New character options include the new sorcerer class, the thief is renamed rogue (a term that 2nd edition uses to classify both the thief and bard classes), and the prestige classes are introduced, which characters can only enter at higher character levels and if they meet certain character-design prerequisites or fulfill certain in-game goals. Later products include additional and supplementary rules subsystems such as "epic-level" options for characters above 20th level, as well as a heavily revised treatment of psionics.

The d20 System is presented under the Open Game License, which makes it an open source system for which authors can write new games and game supplements without the need to develop a unique rules system and, more importantly, without the need for direct approval from Wizards of the Coast. This makes it easier to market D&D-compatible content under a broadly recognizable commercial license.

The third edition introduced iconic characters, a group of recurring characters exemplifying the different classes, used in illustrations and text explanations. They appear in a variety of Dungeons & Dragons game manuals and tie-in novels.

==== Dungeons & Dragons v3.5 ====
In July 2003, a revised version of the 3rd edition D&D rules (termed v. 3.5) was released that incorporated numerous small rule changes, as well as expanding the Dungeon Master's Guide and Monster Manual. This revision was intentionally a small one focusing on addressing common complaints about certain aspects of gameplay, hence the "half edition" version number. The basic rules are fundamentally the same, only differing in balancing. Many monsters and items are compatible (or even unchanged) between those editions. New spells are added, and numerous changes are made to existing spells, while some spells are removed from the updated Player's Handbook. New feats are added and numerous changes are made to existing feats, while several skills are renamed or merged with other skills.

Jackson Haime, for Screen Rant, highlighted that "Wizards of the Coast printed 12 different core D&D rulebooks between 2000 and 2007. At the same time, they published over 50 supplements that added additional rules, features, races, and magic items to the game".

=== Dungeons & Dragons 4th edition ===
On August 15, 2007, Wizards of the Coast announced the development of D&D 4th edition. In December 2007, the book Wizards Presents: Races and Classes, the first preview of 4th Edition, was released. This was followed by a second book in January 2008 named Wizards Presents: Worlds and Monsters. The Player's Handbook, Monster Manual, and Dungeon Master's Guide were released in June 2008.

Slashdot reported anger from some players and retailers due to the financial investment in v3.5 and the relatively brief period of time that it had been in publication. Although many players chose to continue playing older editions, or other games such as Pathfinder by Paizo Publishing (itself based on D&D v3.5 via the Open Game License), the initial print run of the 4th edition sold out during preorders, and Wizards of the Coast announced a second print run prior to the game's official release.

Unlike previous editions with just three core rulebooks, 4th edition core rules include multiple volumes of the Player's Handbook, Dungeon Master's Guide, and Monster Manual that were released yearly, with each new book becoming a part of the core. In the first Player's Handbook, the warlock and warlord are included, while the barbarian, bard, druid, sorcerer and monk are not present. Of those classes, the first four were included in Player's Handbook 2, while the monk class appears in Player's Handbook 3. The system of prestige classes is replaced by a system in which characters at 11th level choose a "paragon path", a specialty based on their class, which defines some of their new powers through 20th level; at level 21, an "epic destiny" is chosen in a similar manner. Core rules extend to level 30 rather than level 20, bringing "epic level" play back into the core rules.

Mechanically, 4th edition saw a major overhaul of the game's systems. Changes in spells and other per-encounter resourcing, giving all classes a similar number of at-will, per-encounter and per-day powers. Powers have a wide range of effects including inflicting status effects, creating zones, and forced movement, making combat very tactical for all classes but essentially requiring use of miniatures, reinforced by the use of squares to express distances. Attack rolls, skill checks and defense values all get a bonus equal to one-half level, rounded down, rather than increasing at different rates depending on class or skill point investment. Each skill is either trained (providing a fixed bonus on skill checks, and sometimes allowing more exotic uses for the skills) or untrained, but in either case all characters also receive a bonus to all skill rolls based on level. A system of "healing surges" and short and long rests are introduced to act as resource management.

In 2012, MJ Harnish of Wired commented that it was unclear what the "lasting legacy" of 4th Edition would be – "on the positive side, it introduced a new way to play the game, adding streamlined play, improved ease of dungeon master preparation, and character classes that were complementary and balanced. [...] On the other hand, the introduction of 4E caused a major schism in the D&D player base and publishing world alike, one that ultimately lead to the rise of the Pathfinder RPG and a fragmentation of D&D's player base". In 2024, Torner highlighted that this edition focused on mechanical balance and "was a purely combat-based miniatures game that afforded each character comparable advantages on the battlefield. This meant a standardization of various components of character building. [...] Fourth edition improved D&D as a tactical combat game by providing PCs clear options in every fight, and a range of options beyond standard sword swinging for" multiple combat rounds. However, Torner viewed the edition as unsuccessful "despite its emphasis on game balance".

==== Dungeons & Dragons Essentials ====
This product line debuted in September 2010 and consists of ten products intended to lower the barrier of entry into the game. Essentials uses the D&D 4th edition rule set and provides simple player character options intended for first-time players. Many of the new player character options emulate features from previous editions, such as schools of magic for the wizard class, to appeal to older players who had not adopted the 4th edition rules. "The goal of Essentials was to provide a new core of rule books that were simplified, updated, and errataed, so that they'd be easier to use".

The Essentials line contains revisions to the rule set compiled over the prior two years, in the form of the Rules Compendium, which condenses rules and errata into one volume, while also updating the rules with newly introduced changes. The player books Heroes of the Fallen Lands and Heroes of the Forgotten Kingdoms contain rules for creating characters, as well as new builds for each class described in the books. Other Essentials releases include a Dungeon Master's Kit and Monster Vault, each also containing accessories.

Shannon Appelcline, author of Designers & Dragons, highlighted that the Essentials line was "primarily the brain child of Mike Mearls". Appelcline wrote, "though the first goal with the release of D&D 4e had been to draw in established players, Wizards now wanted to bring in new players as well. [...] Essentials was more than just a chance to approach a new audience. It was also a revamp of the 4e game. Mearls was insistent that Essentials would not be a new edition, and so should remain entirely compatible with 4e to date. However, 4e had been heavily errataed in the two years since its release [...]. Essentials provided an opportunity to incorporate those changes and errata back into a set of core rulebooks".

=== Dungeons & Dragons 5th edition ===
In January 2012, Wizards of the Coast announced that a new edition of the game, at the time referred to as D&D Next, was under development. In direct contrast to the previous editions of the game, D&D Next was developed partly via a public open playtest. An early build of the new edition debuted at the 2012 Dungeons & Dragons Experience event to about 500 fans. Public playtesting began on May 24, 2012, with the final playtest packet released on September 20, 2013.

The 5th edition's Basic Rules, a free PDF containing complete rules for play and a subset of the player and DM content from the core rulebooks, was released on July 3, 2014. The Starter Set was released on July 15, featuring a set of pre-generated characters, a set of instructions for basic play, and the adventure module Lost Mine of Phandelver. The Player's Handbook was released on August 19, 2014. The fifth edition Monster Manual was released on September 30, 2014. The Dungeon Master's Guide was released on December 9, 2014.

The edition returns to having only three core rule books, with the Player's Handbook containing most major races and classes. Since 2014, there have been over twenty 5th edition Dungeon & Dragons books published including new rulebooks, campaign guides and adventure modules. Expansion books released included Xanathar's Guide to Everything (2017) and Tasha's Cauldron of Everything (2020), and Mordenkainen Presents: Monsters of the Multiverse (2022), which combines and updates material from Volo's Guide to Monsters (2016) and Mordenkainen's Tome of Foes (2018).

In January 2016, Wizards released a System Reference Document for 5th Edition under the Open Game License. This document was later revised and rereleased as System Reference Document 5.1 (SRD 5.1) in May 2016; in January 2023, SRD 5.1 was released under an irrevocable Creative Commons license (CC-BY-4.0).

Mechanically, 5th edition draws heavily on prior editions, while introducing some new mechanics intended to simplify and streamline play. Skills, weapons, items, saving throws, and other things that characters are trained in now all use a single proficiency bonus that increases as character level increases. Multiple defense values have been removed, returning to a single defense value of armor class and using more traditional saving throws. Saving throws are reworked to be situational checks based on the six core abilities instead of generic d20 rolls. Feats are now optional features that can be taken instead of ability score increases and are reworked to be occasional major upgrades instead of frequent minor upgrades. The "advantage/disadvantage" mechanic was introduced, streamlining conditional and situational modifiers to a simpler mechanic: rolling two d20s for a situation and taking the higher of the two for "advantage" and the lower of the two for "disadvantage" and canceling each other out when more than one apply. The power system of 4th edition was replaced with more traditional class features that are gained as characters level. Clerics, druids, paladins, and wizards prepare known spells using a slightly modified version of the spell preparation system of previous editions. Healing Surges are replaced by Hit Dice, requiring a character to roll a hit die during a short rest instead of healing a flat rate of hit points.

==== 2024 revision of 5th Edition ====
In September 2021, it was announced that a backward compatible "evolution" of 5th edition would be released in 2024 to mark the 50th anniversary of the game. In August 2022, Wizards announced that the next phase of major changes for Dungeons & Dragons would occur under the One D&D initiative which included a public playtest of the next version of Dungeons & Dragons. The first public playtest was released on D&D Beyond on August 18, 2022. In October 2022, Dicebreaker reported that Wizards of the Coast president Cynthia Williams announced "that One D&D's playtest had seen more sign-ups since it launched on August 18 than D&D 5E's playtest saw during its entire two-year pre-release phase ahead of the game's release in 2014".

During the April 2023 D&D Creator Summit, the lead rules designer clarified that "One D&D is not supposed to be a new edition or a new 'half edition' similar to the game's '3.5 edition'. Instead, One D&D are revisions to the existing 5th Edition rules while keeping the bulks of those rules intact". In May 2023, Wizards dropped the One D&D branding.

Revised editions of the Player's Handbook, Monster Manual, and Dungeon Master's Guide were released between September 2024 and February 2025. The new Player's Handbook has 12 classes with four subclasses each.

In March 2026, D&D Beyond began to refer to 2024 revision content as "5.5e" to reflect the nomenclature of the fan community.

== Dungeons & Dragons variants ==
Kenzer & Company received permission from Wizards of the Coast to produce a parody version of 1st and 2nd edition AD&D. They published the humorously numbered HackMaster 4th edition from 2001 until they lost their license. The game was well received and won the Origins Award for Game of the Year 2001. A new edition of HackMaster was released in 2011 that no longer uses AD&D mechanics as Kenzer & Company's license expired.

=== Open Game License ===
The publication of the System Reference Document (SRD) for 3rd edition under the Open Game License (OGL) allowed other companies to use the rules to create their own variants of Dungeons & Dragons, providing that they did not use anything Wizards of the Coast considered trade dress or signature content, known as "product identity" under the terms of the OGL. In January 2016, Wizards of the Coast published an updated SRD for 5th edition D&D.

"Retro-clones" are variants created to even more closely simulate previous editions, part of a movement known as the Old School Renaissance. Castles & Crusades, published in 2004 by Troll Lord Games, is an early example of the OGL and SRD being used to recreate the experience of older editions. Prominent retro-clones include Labyrinth Lord, OSRIC, and Swords & Wizardry.

The Pathfinder Roleplaying Game was first published in 2009 by Paizo Publishing. It is intended to be backward-compatible with D&D v. 3.5 while adjusting some rules balance, and has been nicknamed "v. 3.75" by some fans. Pathfinder has been one of the best-selling role playing games in the industry. A second edition, which moves away from the v. 3.5 mechanics, was published in 2019.

13th Age is a game designed by Jonathan Tweet, a lead designer of the 3rd Edition, and Rob Heinsoo, a lead designer of 4th Edition, and published by Pelgrane Press in 2013.

In January 2023, Wizards of the Coast announced that the full System Reference Document 5.1 (SRD 5.1) would be released under the CC-BY-4.0 license.

== International editions ==
The D&D franchise has been translated and published in several languages around the world.

A particular challenge has been the word dungeon, which in standard English means a single prison cell or oubliette originally located under a keep. Some languages, like Spanish, Italian, Finnish, and Portuguese, didn't translate the title of the game and kept it as it is in English: Dungeons & Dragons. In Spanish-speaking countries, the 1983 animated series was translated in Hispanic America as Calabozos y Dragones and in Spain as Dragones y Mazmorras (calabozo and mazmorra have in all Spanish-speaking countries the same meaning: a dungeon). In Brazil, the same animated series was translated as Caverna do Dragão (Dragon's Cave). This still brings great confusion amongst Spanish-speaking and Brazilian gamers about the name of the game, since all Spanish and Brazilian Portuguese translations of the game kept the original English title. In gaming jargon, however, a dungeon is not a single holding cell but rather a network of underground passages or subterranea to be explored, such as a cave, ruins or catacombs. Some translations conveyed this meaning well, e.g. Chinese 龙与地下城 (Dragons and Underground Castles, or Dragons and Underground Cities). Some translations used a false friend of "dungeon", even if it changed the meaning of the title, such as the French Donjons et dragons (Keeps and Dragons). In Hebrew, the game was published as מבוכים ודרקונים (Labyrinths and Dragons). Additionally, some translations adopted the English word "dungeon" as a game term, leaving it untranslated in the text as well.

== See also ==
- List of Dungeons & Dragons rulebooks

== Bibliography ==
- Allston, A. (August 1992). Wrath of the Immortals. Advanced Dungeons & Dragons 2nd Edition (AD&D2E). Lake Geneva, WI: TSR. ISBN 978-1-56076-412-0.
- Carter, M. (December 2007). Races and Classes. Dungeons & Dragons (D&D) 4th edition. Renton, WA: Wizards of the Coast. ISBN 978-0-7869-4801-7.
- Cook, D. (March 1989). Breault, M (ed.). Player's Handbook. AD&D2E. TSR. ISBN 978-0-88038-716-3.
- Cook, D. (June 1989). Spector, W.; Rabe, J.; Schend, S (eds.). Dungeon Master's Guide. AD&D2E. TSR. ISBN 978-0-88038-729-3.
- Cook, M.; Tweet, J. & Williams, S. (September 2000). Dungeon Master's Guide: Core Rulebook II. D&D 3rd edition. Wizards of the Coast. ISBN 978-0-7869-1551-4.
- Cook, M.; Tweet, J. & Williams, S. (July 2003). Dungeon Master's Guide: Core Rulebook II v.3.5. Revised by D. Noonan & R. Redman. Wizards of the Coast. ISBN 978-0-7869-2889-7.
- Collins, A.; Noonan, D.; Wyatt, J. (2003). D&D v.3.5 Accessory Update Booklet. Wizards of the Coast. Archived from the original (PDF) on August 11, 2003.
- Gygax, G. & Arneson, D. (1974). Dungeons & Dragons (Original ed.). TSR.
- Gygax, G. & Arneson, D. (1977). Holmes, J. E (ed.). D&D: Basic Set. TSR. ISBN 978-0-394-51111-5.
- Gygax, G. (1977). Monster Manual. Advanced Dungeons & Dragons (AD&D). TSR. ISBN 978-0-935696-00-4.
- Gygax, G. (1978). Player's Handbook. AD&D. TSR. ISBN 978-0-935696-01-1.
- Gygax, G. (1979). Dungeon Master's Guide. AD&D. TSR. ISBN 978-0-935696-02-8.
- Gygax, G. & Arneson, D. (March 1981). Moldvay, T (ed.). D&D Fantasy Adventure Game: Basic Set. TSR. ISBN 978-0-394-51834-3.
- Gygax, G. & Arneson, D. (November 1981). Cook, D. (ed.). D&D: Expert Set. TSR. ISBN 978-0-394-52198-5.
- Gygax, G. & Arneson, D. (May 1983). Mentzer, F. (ed.). D&D Set 1: Basic Rules. TSR. ISBN 978-0-88038-338-7.
- Gygax, G. & Arneson, D. (October 1983). Mentzer, F. (ed.). D&D Set 2: Expert Rules. TSR. ISBN 978-0-88038-339-4.
- Gygax, G. & Mentzer, F. (January 1985). D&D Set 4: Master Rules. TSR. ISBN 978-0-88038-342-4.
- Hahn, J. A.; Mead, L.; Malcolmson, I. (2003). "Dungeons & Dragons FAQ". Wizards of the Coast. Archived from the original on April 29, 2001.
- Johnson, H.; Winter, S.; Adkinson, P.; Stark, E. & Archer, P. (October 2004). 30 Years of Adventure: A Celebration of Dungeons & Dragons. Wizards of the Coast. ISBN 978-0-7869-3498-0.
- Mentzer, F. (July 1984). D&D Set 3: Companion Rules. TSR. ISBN 978-0-88038-340-0.
- Mentzer, F. (June 1986). D&D Set 5: Immortals Rules. TSR. ISBN 978-0-88038-341-7.
- Schend, S. E. (November 1991). Pickens, J; Warty, D (eds.). D&D Rules Cyclopedia. TSR. ISBN 978-1-56076-085-6.
- Tweet, J.; Cook, M. & Williams, S. (August 2000). Player's Handbook: Core Rulebook I. D&D 3rd edition. Wizards of the Coast. ISBN 978-0-7869-1550-7.
- Tweet, J.; Cook, M. & Williams, S. (July 2003). Player's Handbook: Core Rulebook I v.3.5. Revised by A. Collins. Wizards of the Coast. ISBN 978-0-7869-2886-6.
- Ward, J. M. (February 1990). Moore, R. E (ed.). "The Game Wizards: Angry Mothers from Heck (and what we do about them)". Dragon (154). Lake Geneva, WI: TSR: 9. ISSN 0279-6848.
- Williams, S. (2000). "Conversion Manual". Wizards of the Coast. Archived from the original (PDF) on February 9, 2006.
- Williams, S.; Cook, M. & Tweet, J. (October 2000). Monster Manual: Core Rulebook III. D&D 3rd edition. Wizards of the Coast. ISBN 978-0-7869-1552-1.
- Williams, S.; Cook, M. & Tweet, J. (July 2003). Monster Manual: Core Rulebook III v.3.5. Revised by R. Baker. Wizards of the Coast. ISBN 978-0-7869-2893-4.
