= Dragon (magazine) =

Magazine published by TSR

- Issue 300
- Editors: Timothy J. Kask; Jake Jaquet; Kim Mohan; Roger E. Moore; Wolfgang Baur; Pierce B. Watters; Anthony J. Bryant; Dave Gross; Jesse Decker; Chris Thomasson; Matthew Sernett; Erik Mona; Chris Youngs; Steve Winter
- Categories: Role-playing games
- Frequency: Monthly
- First issue: The Strategic Review (March 1975); The Dragon (June 1976)
- Final issue: Print: #359 (September 2007); Digital: #430 (December 2013)
- Company: TSR; Wizards of the Coast; Paizo
- Country: United States
- Website: www.dragonmag.com (redirects to D&D Beyond (dndbeyond.com); archive index)
- ISSN: 1062-2101

Dragon was one of the two official magazines for source material for the Dungeons & Dragons role-playing game and associated products, along with Dungeon.

TSR, Inc. originally launched the monthly printed magazine in 1976 to succeed the company's earlier publication, The Strategic Review. The final printed issue was #359 in September 2007. Shortly after the last print issue shipped in mid-August 2007, Wizards of the Coast (part of Hasbro, Inc.), the publication's current copyright holder, relaunched Dragon as an online magazine, continuing with the numbering of the print edition. The last published issue was No. 430 in December 2013. A digital publication called Dragon+, which replaced Dragon magazine, was launched in 2015. It was created by the advertising agency Dialect in collaboration with Wizards of the Coast, and its numbering system for issues started at No. 1.

== History ==
=== TSR ===
In 1975, TSR, Inc. began publishing The Strategic Review. At the time, roleplaying games were still seen as a subgenre of the wargaming industry, and the magazine was designed not only to support Dungeons & Dragons and TSR's other games, but also to cover wargaming in general. In short order, however, the popularity and growth of Dungeons & Dragons made it clear that the game had not only separated itself from its wargaming origins, but had launched an entirely new industry unto itself.

TSR canceled The Strategic Review the following year after only seven issues, and replaced it with two magazines, Little Wars, which covered miniature wargaming, and The Dragon, which covered role playing games. After twelve issues, Little Wars ceased independent publication and issue 13 was published as part of Dragon issue 22.

The magazine debuted as The Dragon in June 1976. TSR co-founder Gary Gygax commented years later: "When I decided that The Strategic Review was not the right vehicle, hired Tim Kask as a magazine editor for Tactical Studies Rules, and named the new publication he was to produce The Dragon, I thought we would eventually have a great periodical to serve gaming enthusiasts worldwide... At no time did I ever contemplate so great a success or so long a lifespan."

Dragon is the launching point for a number of rules, spells, monsters, magic items, and other ideas that were incorporated into later official products of the Dungeons & Dragons game. A prime example is the Forgotten Realms campaign setting, which first became known through a series of Dragon articles in the 1980s by its creator Ed Greenwood. It subsequently went on to become one of the primary campaign "worlds" for official Dungeons and Dragons products, starting in 1987. The magazine appeared on the cover as simply Dragon from July 1980, later changing its name to Dragon Magazine starting November 1987.

=== Wizards of the Coast ===
Wizards of the Coast purchased TSR and its intellectual properties, including Dragon Magazine, in 1997. Production was then transferred from Wisconsin to Washington state. In 1999, Wizards of the Coast was itself purchased by Hasbro, Inc. Dragon Magazine suffered a five-month gap between #236 and #237 but remained published by TSR as a subsidiary of WotC starting September 1997, and until January 2000 when WotC became the listed de facto publisher. They removed the word "magazine" from the cover title starting with the June 2000 issue, changing the publication's name back to simply Dragon.

In 1999 a CD-ROM compilation of the first 250 issues, called Dragon Magazine Archive, was released in PDF format with a special viewer. It includes the seven issues of The Strategic Review. The Dragon Magazine Archive is out of print because of issues raised with the 2001 ruling in Greenberg v. National Geographic regarding the reprint rights of various comic strips that had been printed in Dragon over the years and Paizo Publishing's policy that creators of comics retain their copyright. These comic strips include Wormy, What's New with Phil & Dixie, Snarf Quest, and Knights of the Dinner Table which is covered in TSR's own statement in the first issue that "All material published herein becomes the exclusive property of the publisher unless special arrangements to the contrary are made."

=== Paizo ===
In 2002, Paizo Publishing acquired the rights to publish both Dragon and Dungeon under license from Wizards of the Coast. Dragon was published by Paizo starting September 2002. It ties Dragon more closely to Dungeon by including articles supporting and promoting its major multi-issue adventures such as the Age of Worms and Savage Tide. Class Acts, a monthly publication with one- or two-page articles offering ideas for developing specific character classes, were also introduced by Paizo.

=== Return to Wizards of the Coast ===
On April 18, 2007, Wizards of the Coast announced that it would not be renewing Paizo's licenses for Dragon and Dungeon, instead opting for online publishing. Paizo published the last print editions of Dragon and Dungeon magazines for September 2007.

In August 2007, Wizards of the Coast announced the fourth edition of the Dungeons & Dragons game and that D&D Insider subscriber content would include the new, online versions of both Dungeon and Dragon magazines along with tools for building campaigns, managing character sheets, and other features. In its online form, Dragon continues to publish articles aimed at Dungeons & Dragons players, with rules data from these articles feeding the D&D Character Builder and other online tools.

==== Cessation ====
In the September 2013 issue of Dragon (#427) an article by Wizards of the Coast game designer and editor Chris Perkins announced that both Dragon and its sibling publication Dungeon would be going on hiatus starting January 2014 pending the release of Dungeons & Dragons 5th edition. The final online version released is Issue #430 in December 2013.

==== Dragon+ ====
A new and fully digital bi-monthly publication called Dragon+, was launched on April 30, 2015, succeeding the existing versions of Dragon and Dungeon magazines. Created by Dialect in collaboration with Wizards of the Coast, the online edition ceased continuity with the printed and digital versions of both magazines, and restarted its numbering system for issues at No. 1.

The magazine branded itself as an app with content "showcasing what's new in Dungeons & Dragons – from backstory and world information to discussions about what's coming next from the creators and developers of your favorite D&D products". Articles included cover content such as: game strategies and insights; details of the current D&D storyline; interviews; ongoing comic series; lore; Forgotten Realms world information; community updates and fan submissions; and videos. Additional content in the magazine is also accessible through links to the magazine's content in Facebook and Twitter feeds.

Dragon+ ran for 41 issues in total with the last issue published in April 2022; Wizards of the Coast published an update in July 2022 announcing the cancellation of the publication. On November 15, 2022, Wizards of the Coast announced that "Dragon+ will be removed from app stores on or around November 15th, and dragonmag.com will be redirected and its content will no longer be available".

== Content ==
Many of the gaming world's most famous writers, game designers and artists have published work in the magazine. Through most of its run the magazine frequently published fantasy fiction, either short stories or novel excerpts. After the 1990s, the appearance of fiction stories became relatively rare. One late example was issue #305's featured excerpt from George R. R. Martin's later Hugo-nominated novel A Feast for Crows. It also featured book reviews of fantasy and science fiction novels, and occasionally of films of particular interest (such as the TV movie of Mazes and Monsters).

From the magazine's beginning until issue 274, from August 2000, Dragon published articles for various versions of Dungeons & Dragons and, at various times, other gaming systems. With issue 274, Dragon published exclusively 3rd Edition D&D content, or content for other games published by Wizards of the Coast's d20 System games. With the release of the 3.5 Edition update in July 2003, issue 309 onward published only Edition 3.5 content and carried a "100% Official Dungeons & Dragons" masthead. The magazine switched to exclusively 4th Edition D&D content from issue 364 on the release of 4th Edition in June 2008.

=== Articles ===
Most of the magazine's articles provide supplementary material for D&D including new prestige classes, races, and monsters. A long-running column, "Sage Advice", offers official answers to Dungeons & Dragons questions submitted by players. Other articles provide tips and suggestions for players and Dungeon Masters (DMs). It sometimes discusses meta-gaming issues, such as getting along with fellow players. At the end of its print run, the magazine also features four comics; Nodwick, Dork Tower, Zogonia, and a specialized version of the webcomic The Order of the Stick. Previous gamer-oriented comic strips include Knights of the Dinner Table, Finieous Fingers, What's New with Phil & Dixie, Wormy, Yamara, and SnarfQuest.

Dragon's "Ecology of ..." articles were initially written in the voice of the fictional sage Elminster, who reviewed a D&D monster in-depth. Under Paizo's tenure such ecology articles became heavier in game mechanics than narrative and description. The Dragon submissions guidelines explicitly state that Ecology articles "should have a hunter's guidebook approach, although it should not be written 'in voice'" and further specify the exact format of Ecology articles, leaving less room for artistic license by the author.

In the early 1980s, almost every issue contains a role playing adventure, a simple board game, or some kind of special game supplement (such as a cardboard cut-out castle). For instance, Tom Wham's Snit's Revenge, The Awful Green Things from Outer Space, and File 13 all started as supplements within The Dragon. These bonus features were infrequent after the 1986 launch of Dungeon magazine, which published several new Dungeons & Dragons adventures in each issue.

During the 1980s, after TSR had purchased Simulations Publications Inc., the magazine had a subsection called Ares Magazine, based on SPI's magazine of that name, specializing in science fiction and superhero role playing games, with pages marked by a gray border. The content included write-ups for various characters of the Marvel Universe for TSR's Marvel Super-Heroes.

=== Special issues ===
As noted above The Dragon was preceded by seven issues of The Strategic Review. In the magazine's early years it also published five "Best of" issues, reprinting highly regarded articles from The Strategic Review and The Dragon. From 1996 to 2001, Dragon Magazine published the "Dragon Annual", a thirteenth issue of all new content.

== Editors ==
Print versions:

- #1–34: Timothy J. Kask, Editor
- #35–48: Jake Jaquet, Editor
- #49–114 & 199–217: Kim Mohan, Editor-in-Chief
- #115–198: Roger E. Moore, Editor
- #218–221: Wolfgang Baur, Editor
- #222–238: Pierce B. Watters, Editor-in-Chief
- #222–229: Anthony J. Bryant, Editor
- #230–287: Dave Gross, Editor & Editor-in-Chief
- #288–311: Jesse Decker, Editor-in-Chief
- #312–315: Chris Thomasson, Editor-in-Chief
- #316–326: Matthew Sernett, Editor-in-Chief
- #327–359: Erik Mona, Editor-in-Chief

Digital (online/PDF) versions:

- #360–387: Chris Youngs, Editor-in-Chief
- #388–430: Steve Winter, Editor-in-Chief
- (Dragon+) #1–7: Matt Chapman, Editor-in-Chief; #8–13 John Houlihan, Editor-in-Chief; #14–present Matt Chapman, Editor-in-Chief

== Reception ==
In Issue 15 of Abyss, Dave Nalle reviewed the magazine in 1980 and commented, "The Dragon has always suffered from the stigma of its days as a blatant house organ [for TSR]. It has gotten better, though it has relapses. It makes an honest effort to cover the field, including some boardgames. There is a natural tendency to give a bit too much space to TSR games ... Other clear weaknesses are a habit of aiming at the juvenile fantasy role-playing gamer in many articles, and the over-abundance of advertising." Nalle concluded, "In spite of these problems, TD is a good magazine, because it maintains a standard of quality and presents that quality in high quantity as well."

== Awards ==
- 1984: Origins Award for Best Professional Roleplaying Magazine of 1984
- 1986: Origins Award for Best Professional Roleplaying Magazine of 1985
- 1987: Origins Award for "Special Award for Outstanding Achievement of 1987".
- 1990: Origins Award for Best Professional Adventure Gaming Magazine of 1989
- 1994: Origins Award for Best Professional Gaming Magazine of 1993
- 1995: Origins Awards for Best Professional Gaming Magazine of 1994, Origins Adventure Gaming Hall of Fame
- 2004: Origins Award for Best Game Related Periodical 2003
- 2006: ENnie Award Gold Winner for Best Supplement (Dragon Compendium Vol. 1)
- 2007: Origins Award for Best Non-Fiction Publication of the Year 2006

== Other releases ==
Dragon Magazine Archive
- Operating system: Microsoft Windows
- Website: www.wizards.com/dnd/tool.aspx?x=dnd/4new/tool/dragonmagazine

A collection of Dragon was released as the Dragon Magazine Archive in 1999. It was released as a CD-ROM with a Windows application and PDF files. The Dragon Magazine Archive was directed by Rob Voce, and published by TSR/Wizards of the Coast. Pyramid reviewed it, saying that the archive was "worth the price", but that its application's Windows-only format limits other platforms from being able to read the files manually. AllGame had some issues with the interface but said it was worth picking up for browsing ideas for a campaign. It was reviewed in Backstab #19.
