= OSRIC =

Role-playing game system

OSRIC - Old School Reference and Index Compilation
- Cover of the first edition
- Designers: Stuart Marshall and Matt Finch
- Publishers: Knights-n-Knaves, Black Blade Publishing and Usherwood Publishing
- Publication: original 2006, revised 2013
- Genres: Tabletop RPG
- Systems: OSR

OSRIC, short for Old School Reference and Index Compilation, is a fantasy role-playing game system. It is a remake of the first edition of Advanced Dungeons & Dragons (AD&D), and one of the most successful Dungeons & Dragons retro-clones. OSRIC describes itself as "a compilation of rules for old school-style fantasy gaming...intended to reproduce underlying rules used in the late 1970s to early 1980s". OSRIC uses the Open Gaming License and the System Reference Document of Dungeons & Dragons 3rd edition to create a new presentation of the first edition rule set.

== History ==
The purpose of OSRIC is to provide publishers with a tool to legally produce gaming materials compatible with first edition AD&D. More than 20 different publishers have produced more than 500 products branded as OSRIC-compatible.

The initial version of OSRIC was released in 2006. The OSRIC rules are free to download from the game's site in PDF form. OSRIC v. 2.0 was released in 2008. In June 2009, hard copy versions of the rules became available from the Lulu print-on-demand service. Additionally, Black Blade Publishing and Usherwood Publishing together released a deluxe hard-bound print version with extra art and indices not appearing in other editions.

OSRIC v. 2.2, was released in 2013.

OSRIC v. 3.0, was released in 2025.
