= Labyrinth Lord =

Role-playing game

- Labyrinth Lord Revised Edition
- Designers: Daniel Proctor
- Publishers: Goblinoid Games
- Publication: 2007 (original); 2009 (Revised Edition); 2025 (Revised & Expanded)
- Years active: 2007-present
- Genres: Fantasy
- Playing time: Varies
- Chance: Dice rolling
- Skills: Role-playing, improvisation, tactics, arithmetic
- Website: https://goblinoidgames.com

Labyrinth Lord (LL) is a fantasy role-playing game written and edited by Daniel Proctor and published by Goblinoid Games. It emulates the rules and feel of Dungeons & Dragons (D&D) using the Open Game License (OGL) from Wizards of the Coast. LL is based on the 1981 D&D Basic Set edited by Tom Moldvay and its accompanying Expert Set by David "Zeb" Cook.

== Compatibility with classic Dungeons & Dragons ==
Any adventure intended to be played with classic D&D can be run using LL with little or no adjustment. However, there are a few differences between the two games. It extends the rules so characters can advance to 20th level (the 1981 Expert set only included levels up to 14). In addition, the cleric class in LL can cast spells at first level, unlike in the 1981 rules.

== Distribution ==
Goblinoid Games was the first retro-clone publisher to both make most content open under the OGL and create a free trademark license with few restrictions. The material contained in the LL rules is available to others with few restrictions, allowing fans and other publishers alike to create their own derivative material for use with the system.

== Reception ==
Labyrinth Lord was a runner up in the Indie RPG Awards Best Free Game category in 2007, and it received an Honorable Mention in the Best Game category of the 2010 ENnies.

The Escapist recommended Labyrinth Lord in their 2009 Holiday Buyer's Guide. Comparing its tone to 4th Edition D&D's "zany, over-powered sensibility", they wrote, "Labyrinth Lord feels like a Vietnam War movie, where the dungeons are dark, wet, and terrifying, goblins murder all your friends with spiked-pit traps and crossbow bolts from the shadows, and you start to develop a thousand yard infravision stare from the spell shock."

Labyrinth Lord has been translated in German, with the subtitle Herr der Labyrinthe under the original English title. Bastian Ludwig made a positive review in Ringbote - das online Spielemagazin published by Pegasus Spiele, and also reviewed Labyrinth Lord material released in German, Die Larm-Chroniken (Moritz Mehlem, Mantikore-Verlag 2010). An Italian translation, subtitled Il Signore dei Labirinti has been published in 2009 under the Goblinoid Games logo.
