= List of Eberron modules and sourcebooks =

This is a list of Dungeons & Dragons products that are based on the Eberron campaign setting.

== 3.5 edition ==
Title	Author	Date	Subject	ISBN
Eberron Campaign Setting	—	June 2004	The core campaign setting, providing the campaign specific rules and details on the continent of Khorvaire. It is a basic requirement to use other Dungeons & Dragons 3.5 Eberron products. It includes the introductory adventure The Forgotten Forge	0-7869-3274-0
Sharn: City of Towers	—	November 2004	Provides additional campaign setting details for the city of Sharn.	0-7869-3434-4
Races of Eberron	—	April 2005	Provides additional campaign setting details for the core races found in Eberron, including more information on the unique races of the setting.	0-7869-3658-4
Five Nations	—	July 2005	Details the people and landmarks of the Five Nations that make up the former Kingdom of Galifar: Aundair, Breland, Karrnath, Thrane, and the Mournland (the former nation of Cyre).	0-7869-3690-8
Explorer's Handbook	—	August 2005	Provides additional campaign setting details for the continents of Eberron and describes the major modes of travel in and between them.	0-7869-3691-6
Magic of Eberron	—	October 2005	Details the many kinds of magic found in Eberron.	0-7869-3696-7
Deluxe Eberron Dungeon Master's Screen	—	July 2005	Includes information from the standard Deluxe D&D Dungeon Master's Screen, with modifications and additional material appropriate for game elements unique to the Eberron setting. Also includes a poster map of Khorvaire.	0-7869-3850-1
Deluxe Eberron Player Character Sheets	—	August 2005	Based on the D&D Deluxe Player Character Sheets and also include a sheet for the new class introduced in the setting.	0-7869-3849-8
Player's Guide to Eberron	—	January 2006	Covers key topics a character should know about, from Aerenal to Zilargo, house politics to the Last War, dragons to the Lords of Dust, without revealing information meant for Dungeon Masters only.	0-7869-3912-5
Secrets of Xen'drik	—	July 2006	Offers the first in-depth look at the lost continent of Xen’drik, the adventure-rich, ruin-laden, unknown land to the south of Khorvaire.	0-7869-3916-8
Faiths of Eberron	—	September 2006	Presents detailed descriptions of the major religions of Eberron, including the rival pantheons of the Sovereign Host and the Dark Six, the young faith of the Silver Flame, and the shadowed Blood of Vol.	0-7869-3934-6
Dragonmarked	—	November 2006	Offers an in-depth look at the power of dragonmarks and the thirteen dragonmarked houses of the Eberron world.	0-7869-3933-8
Secrets of Sarlona	—	February 2007	Explores the continent of Sarlona for the first time. It gives players and Dungeon Masters their first real glimpse inside the empire of Riedra, home of the Inspired and the kalashtar.	0-7869-4037-9
The Forge of War	—	June 2007	Secrets of the Last War revealed, plus new character options for war-torn heroes.	0-7869-4153-7
Dragons of Eberron	—	October 2007	Delves into the mysterious Draconic Prophecy and various draconic organizations. It introduces the continent of Argonnessen, homeland of the dragons, and describes various adventure sites and other places of interest that have never before been presented.	978-0-7869-4154-4
City of Stormreach	—	February 2008	Describes the shadowy ruins, sinister organizations, and treasure-laden dungeons that make Stormreach such an appealing destination for player characters. In addition to providing Dungeon Masters with a richly detailed city for their Xen’drik based campaigns, this supplement presents information on the movers and shakers of Stormreach, ready-to-use adversaries, adventure hooks, and location maps.	978-0-7869-4803-1
An Adventurer's Guide to Eberron	—	March 2008	Illustrated 64-page visual guide to the world of Eberron.	978-0-7869-4855-0

=== Adventures ===
Title	Author	Date	Subject	Levels	ISBN
Shadows of the Last War	―	July 2004	This adventure is designed as a sequel to The Forgotten Forge from the core campaign setting, but can be run on its own.	2–3	0-7869-3276-7
Whispers of the Vampire's Blade	―	September 2004	This adventure is designed as follow on adventure to Shadows of the Last War for 4th-level heroes, but it can be run on its own. It takes them across the continent of Khorvaire with action-packed overland and aerial travel.	4–5	0-7869-3510-3
Grasp of the Emerald Claw	―	January 2005	This adventure is designed as a sequel to Whispers of the Vampire's Blade for 6th-level heroes, but can be run on its own.	6	0-7869-3652-5
Voyage of the Golden Dragon	―	April 2006	This adventure is designed as a stand-alone adventure for 7th-level heroes focusing on the first voyage of a massive airship.	7	0-7869-3907-9
Eyes of the Lich Queen	―	April 2007	This super-adventure is for levels 5–10, involves dragons, the Blood of Vol, and a curse tied to the Draconic Prophecy.	5–10	978-0-7869-4319-7

== 4th edition ==
=== Core products ===
Title	Author	Date	Subject	ISBN
Eberron Player's Guide	―	June 2009	Core D&D game supplement, providing campaign rules and details for player characters in Eberron using 4th Edition Dungeons & Dragons. It provides rules for 3 player races – Changelings, Kalashtar and Warforged; and a new class – the artificer. The book is designed to be useful for using the game mechanics outside of the world of Eberron.	978-0-7869-5100-0
Eberron Campaign Guide	―	July 2009	Guide for a dungeon master to run the Eberron setting under the 4th Edition Dungeons & Dragons rules, providing the campaign specific rules and details on the continent of Khorvaire and the rest of the world of Eberron. It is designed to be used with other Eberron products, but is not required. It includes the introductory adventure The Mark of Prophecy.	978-0-7869-5099-7

=== Adventures ===
Title	Author	Date	Subject	Levels	ISBN
Seekers of the Ashen Crown	―	July 2009	This adventure involves finding an ancient goblin artifact. It is a 4th Edition Dungeons & Dragons adventure placed within the Eberron Setting.	2–5	978-0-7869-5017-1
Dolurrh's Dawn	―	February 2012	Received as a reward for a charitable donation to the Reach Out And Read organization.	–	
Khyber's Harvest	―	June 2009	Wizards of the Coast entry for 2009 Free RPG Day.	―	

== 5th edition ==
=== Unearthed Arcana playtest ===
Title	Author	Date	Subject
Eberron	Mike Mearls	February 2, 2015	New races including Changeling, Shifter (Beasthide, Cliffwalk, Longstride, Longtooth, Razorclaw, Wildhunt) and Warforged; Artificer Wizard; action points; and the Dragonmark feat.
Artificer	Mike Mearls, Jeremy Crawford	January 9, 2017	Player character class: Artificer.
Races of Eberron	Keith Baker, Jeremy Crawford, Mike Mearls, Ruty Rutenberg, Kate Welch	July 23, 2018	Four Eberron themed races: Changelings, Kalashtar, Shifters, Warforged.
Dragonmarks	Keith Baker, Ruty Rutenberg, Ben Petrisor	September 10, 2018	Player options: Dragonmarks (subraces/variant races and feats).
Magic Items of Eberron	Keith Baker, Ruty Rutenberg, Ben Petrisor	October 8, 2018	New magic items for the Eberron setting.
The Artificer Revisited	Jeremy Crawford, Keith Baker, Mike Mearls, Ben Petrisor, James Wyatt	February 28, 2019	Player character class: Artificer (with Alchemist and Artillerist subclasses).
The Artificer Returns	Jeremy Crawford, Keith Baker, Mike Mearls, Ben Petrisor, James Wyatt	May 14, 2019	Player character class: Artificer (with Alchemist, Archivist, Artillerist, and Battle Smith subclasses)
Unearthed Arcana 2024 - The Artificer	N/A	December 17, 2024	Revised Artificer with four revised subclasses (Alchemist, Armorer, Artillerist, and Battle Smith) using the Player's Handbook (2024) ruleset.
Unearthed Arcana 2025 - Eberron Updates	N/A	February 27, 2025	Revised Artificer with a new subclass (Cartographer); Dragonmarks as feats with a progression option.

=== Core products ===
Title	Author	Date	Subject
Wayfinder's Guide to Eberron	Keith Baker, Ruty Rutenberg, Jeremy Crawford, Mike Mearls, Kate Welch	July 2018 (PDF)	Originally described as a "living document" that would be updated as the included concepts went through public playtesting, it was then updated to include the final versions of included content as it appears in Eberron: Rising from the Last War.
Eberron: Rising From The Last War	Jeremy Crawford, James Wyatt, Keith Baker	November 2019	Hardcover campaign book. An alternative art cover by Vance Kelly was released in local game stores on November 17, 2019.
Eberron: Forge of the Artificer	James Wyatt, Jeremy Crawford, Makenzie De Armas, Ron Lundeen, Ben Petrisor, Patrick Renie	December 9, 2025	Following the 2024 revision to the 5th Edition ruleset, this sourcebook will expand on the world of Eberron along with revising the ruleset. It will also include three campaign outlines.

=== Adventures ===
Title	Author	Date	Subject	Levels
Embers of the Last War	Various	September 2018 – December 2018	D&D Adventurers League storyline set in Eberron that corresponds with the Wayfinder's Guide to Eberron. The campaign consists of 12 adventures published digitally.	1–10
The Oracle of War	Various	2019 – 2021	D&D Adventurers League storyline set in the Mournland that corresponds with Eberron: Rising From The Last War. The campaign consists of 20 adventures. Shawn Merwin, Adventurers League Resource Manager, wrote that the Oracle of War storyline is a "very different type of campaign from what has come before [in Adventurers League]. The story presented in Oracle of War plays out in 20 Core Storyline adventures that take characters from level 1 to 20".	1–20
Race for the Crab Temple	TBA	May 2025	Adventure which debuted at PAX East game sessions to preview player options in the upcoming setting sourcebook Eberron: Forge of the Artificer (2025).	3

== Third party ==
The Dungeon Masters Guild is an online store that hosts official Wizards of the Coast products and acts as a platform for third party publishers and individuals "to publish lore, maps, character designs and adventures based on Dungeons & Dragons intellectual property". Utilizing this license, Keith Baker has published multiple non-official Eberron themed adventures and supplements for the 5th Edition on the Dungeon Masters Guild:

- Curtain Call: A Sharn Adventure (August 2018, PDF)
- Trust No One (October 2018, PDF)
- Morgrave Miscellany (March 2019, PDF)
- Exploring Eberron (July 2020, PDF and print on demand)
- Eberron Confidential (November 2020, PDF)
- Dread Metrol: Into the Mists (July 2021, PDF)
- Chronicles of Eberron (December 2022, PDF and print on demand)
- Frontiers of Eberron: Quickstone (September 2024, PDF and print on demand)

== Video games ==
- Dragonshard (PC, September 2005) is a real-time strategy game.
- Dungeons & Dragons Online (PC, February 2006) is a massively multiplayer online roleplaying game initially set in Eberron, although updates throughout its lifetime added elements from the Forgotten Realms campaign setting.
