= An Adventurer's Guide to Eberron =

2008 role-playing game supplement

- Genre: Role-playing game
- Publisher: Wizards of the Coast
- Publication date: March 2008
- Media type: Print
- ISBN: 0-7869-4855-8

An Adventurer's Guide to Eberron is a supplement to the 3.5 edition of the Dungeons & Dragons role-playing game.

== Contents ==
An Adventurer's Guide to Eberron is an accessory for the Eberron setting that is an illustrated 64-page visual guide to the world of Eberron.

Kevin Kulp wrote that "the adventuring races are one of the first things shown. Shifters, changelings, elves, orcs, warforged, kalashtar, and all the other races are richly illustrated and spotlighted. The book ends with the monstrous races: drow, giants, dragons, and power groups such as the Emerald Claw and the Lords of Dust. There's an average of about three full-color illustrations per page, sometimes more, with notes to show sections of a ship or typical adventurer gear".

== Publication history ==
An Adventurer's Guide to Eberron was written by Logan Bonner and Chris Sims, and published in March 2008. The book was illustrated by Dave Allsop, Kalman Andrasofszky, John Avon, Steve Belledin, Mitch Cotie, Daarken, Eric Deschamps, Steve Ellis, Scott Fischer, Gonzalo Flores, Tomás Giorello, D. Alexander Gregory, John Hodgson, Andrew Jones, Dennis Kauth, Rob Lazzaretti, Ron Lemen, Howard Lyon, Warren Mahy, Lee Moyer, William O'Connor, Lucio Parrillo, Steve Prescott, Vinod Rams, Wayne Reynolds, Ryan Sook, Anne Stokes, Mark Tedin, Francis Tsai, Franz Vohwinkel, Anthony Waters, Charlie Wen, Eva Widermann, Ronald Wimberly, Sam Wood, and James Zhang.

== Reception ==
Kulp, for DriveThruRPG, wrote that the book "isn't just an RPG book. Instead, it's a gorgeous coffee table book that acts as a visual guide to the remarkable world of Eberron. You're shown airships and the lightning rail, the towers of Sharn and the ruins of Xen'drik. It's a lavishly illustrated guidebook to the most remarkable places in the game's setting, and it's intended as an introduction for people who haven't yet explored it (or for people who aren't even gamers, but who want to get a feel for what's involved)".
