= Secrets of Sarlona =

2007 role-playing game supplement

- Genre: Role-playing game
- Publisher: Wizards of the Coast
- Publication date: February 2007
- Media type: Print
- ISBN: 0-7869-4037-9

Secrets of Sarlona is a supplement to the 3.5 edition of the Dungeons & Dragons role-playing game.

== Contents ==
Secrets of Sarlona is an accessory for the Eberron setting that explores the continent of Sarlona, a land of lost empires and esoteric arts. It provides a comprehensive overview of Sarlona's nations, including their governments and relations, as well as locations, communities, organizations, and non-player characters. It includes new feats, magic items, prestige classes, psionics, and spells.

== Publication history ==
Secrets of Sarlona was written by Keith Baker, Scott Fitzgerald Gray, Glenn McDonald, and Chris Sims, and published in February 2007. Cover art was by Wayne Reynolds, with interior art by Kalman Andrasofszky, David Bircham, Tomm Coker, Fred Hooper, Ron Lemen, Lucio Parrillo, Jim Pavelec, Martina Pilcerova, Steve Prescott, Anne Stokes, Mark Tedin, Franz Vohwinkel, and James Zhang.
