= Magic of Eberron =

2005 role-playing game supplement

- Genre: Role-playing game
- Publisher: Wizards of the Coast
- Publication date: October 2005
- Media type: Print
- ISBN: 0-7869-3696-7

Magic of Eberron is a supplement to the 3.5 edition of the Dungeons & Dragons role-playing game.

== Contents ==
Magic of Eberron is an accessory for the Eberron setting that exposes the magic and eldritch wonders of Eberron. In addition to presenting new arcane and divine spells, feats, prestige classes, and magic items, Magic of Eberron offers new options and infusions for artificers, explores dragon totem magic and the twisted experiments of the daelkyr, sheds light on the process of elemental binding, and touches on other types of magic present in the world.

== Publication history ==
Magic of Eberron was written by Bruce R. Cordell, Stephen Schubert, and Chris Thomasson, and published in October 2005. Cover art was by Wayne Reynolds, with interior art by David Michael Beck, Igor-Alban Chevalier, Eric Deschamps, Draxhall Jump Entertainment, Tomas Giorello, Lucio Parrillo, Steve Prescott, Anne Stokes, Mark Tedin, and Francis Tsai.
