= Monster Manual V =

Dungeons & Dragons sourcebook

- Author: Wizards Team
- Genre: Role-playing game
- Publisher: Wizards of the Coast
- Publication date: July 2007
- Media type: Print (Hardback)
- Pages: 224
- ISBN: 978-0-7869-4115-5

Monster Manual V is an optional supplemental source book for the 3.5 edition of the Dungeons & Dragons role-playing game.

== Contents ==
As with other Monster Manual supplements, MM5 contains a variety of new creatures as well as expanded variants on staple D&D monsters.

The MM5 was released in July 2007, published in the same format as the Monster Manual IV, featuring lairs and tactics and like III and IV how these new monsters fit into Eberron and Forgotten Realms. According to previews of the Night Below Dungeons & Dragons miniatures set, some of the new monsters that feature in it include the Greenspawn Zealot, the Arcadian Avenger, the Verdant Reaver, and the Carnage Demon.

== Publication history ==
Monster Manual V was released in July 2007, with David Noonan as lead designer, and additional design by Creighton Broadhurst, Jason Bulmahn, David Chart, B. Matthew Conklin III, Jesse Decker, James "Grim" Desborough, Rob Heinsoo, Sterling Hershey, Tim Hitchcock, Luke Johnson, Nicholas Logue, Mike McArtor, Aaron Rosenberg, Robert J. Schwalb, Rodney Thompson, and Wil Upchurch. Cover art was by Henry Higginbotham, with interior art by David Allsop, Jason Chan, Miguel Coimbra, Carl Critchlow, Daarken, Wayne England, Tomás Giorello, Ralph Horsley, Warren Mahy, Izzy Medrano, Steve Prescott, Wayne Reynolds, Skan Srisuwan, Ron Spears, Anne Stokes, Arnie Swekel, Franz Vohwinkel, Anthony Waters, Eva Widermann, and James Zhang.
