= Races of Eberron =

Dungeons & Dragons supplement

- Genre: Role-playing game
- Publisher: Wizards of the Coast
- Publication date: April 2005
- Media type: Print
- ISBN: 0-7869-3658-4

Races of Eberron is a supplement to the 3.5 edition of the Dungeons & Dragons role-playing game.

== Contents ==
Races of Eberron is an accessory for the Eberron setting that provides information on the races originally presented in the Eberron Campaign Setting: the warforged, shifters, changelings, and kalashtar. The includes the psychology, society, culture, behavior, religion, folklore, and other aspects of the races. Races of Eberron also provides new substitution levels, prestige classes, feats, spells, magic items, equipment, and other options for creating characters for any campaign world.

== Publication history ==
Races of Eberron was written by Jesse Decker, Matthew Sernett, Gwendolyn F.M. Kestrel, and Keith Baker, and published in April 2005. Cover art was by Wayne Reynolds, with interior art by Daarken, Eric Deschamps, Tomas Giorello, Doug Gregory, Joshua the James, Howard Lyon, Joe Madureira, Nick Percival, Steve Prescott, Ryan Sook, Anne Stokes, Francis Tsai, Franz Vohwinkel, Kev Walker, Anthony Waters, Charlie Wen, Ronald Wimberly, and James Zhang.

== Reception ==
Trampas Whiteman of Dragonlance Nexus felt that this is the best of the races books and introduces players to new races that are interesting. The book also had a few problems with editing and is missing an index. He suggested that for anyone playing in an Eberron campaign, the book provides a lot of character options. This book is more useful than any of the other books in the series.

In June 2005, the sourcebook was also reviewed in issue 92 of the German RPG periodical Anduin.
