= Player's Guide to Eberron =

2006 role-playing game supplement

- Genre: Role-playing game
- Publisher: Wizards of the Coast
- Publication date: January 2006
- Media type: Print
- ISBN: 0-7869-3912-5

Player's Guide to Eberron is a supplement to the 3.5 edition of the Dungeons & Dragons role-playing game.

== Contents ==
Player's Guide to Eberron is an accessory for the Eberron setting that explores the world from the player's point of view and presents new options for characters. Player's Guide to Eberron describes important locations, events, organizations, races, and features of the Eberron campaign setting, organized so that players can use the book as a handy reference guide. This book also provides new feats, prestige classes, spells, and magic items.

== Publication history ==
Player's Guide to Eberron was written by James Wyatt, Keith Baker, Luke Johnson, and Stan!, and published in January 2006. Cover art was by Wayne Reynolds, with interior art by Anne Stokes, Brent Chumley, David Michael Beck, Draxhall Jump Entertainment, Eric Deschamps, Francis Tsai, Howard Lyon, Lucio Parrillo, Steve Ellis, and Steve Prescott.

Shannon Appelcline wrote that at the time of the 4th edition Dungeons & Dragons book Eberron Player's Guide (2009), "A player's book and a GM's book had already been published for Eberron in its previous incarnation: Player's Guide to Eberron (2006) and Eberron Campaign Setting (2004) for 3.5e. However the designers of 4e Eberron were adamant that the new 4e books were not just translations. The previous books had included a fair amount of duplication because they weren't planned as a coherent set. The new books were, which allowed the designers to create a complementary pair of releases, with the player's book including material intended for the player or both the GM and player".

== Reviews ==
- The Geek Gazette (Issue 5 - Feb 2007)
