= Dragons of Eberron =

Tabletop role-playing game supplement

- Genre: Role-playing game
- Publisher: Wizards of the Coast
- Publication date: October 2007
- Media type: Print
- ISBN: 978-0-7869-4154-4

Dragons of Eberron is a supplement to the 3.5 edition of the Dungeons & Dragons role-playing game.

== Contents ==
Dragons of Eberron is an accessory for the Eberron setting that explores the mysterious draconic prophecy and various dragon-themed organizations. The book explores the content of Argonnessen, homeland of the dragons, and describes various adventure sites. The book also investigates dragons on the continents of Khorvaire, Sarlona, and Xen'drik, and provides several ready-to-play dragons complete with statistics, lairs, and adventure hooks.

== Publication history ==
Dragons of Eberron was written by Keith Baker, Scott Fitzgerald Gray, Nicolas Logue, and Amber Scott, and published in October 2007. Cover art was by Steve Prescott, with interior art by Tomás Giorello, Ron Lemen, Lucio Parrillo, Darrell Riche, Anne Stokes, Franz Vohwinkel, and James Zhang.
