= The Forge of War =

2007 role-playing game supplement

- Genre: Role-playing game
- Publisher: Wizards of the Coast
- Publication date: June 2007
- Media type: Print
- ISBN: 0-7869-4153-7

The Forge of War is a supplement to the 3.5 edition of the Dungeons & Dragons role-playing game.

== Contents ==
The Forge of War is an accessory for the Eberron setting that explores the history of the Last War. New character options allow players to explore battlefield backgrounds, the magic of war, battle scars, and the benefits of working as a team. Campaign seeds help the Dungeon Master introduce the themes and events of the Last War in a current-day campaign or send characters back to their wartime days through flashbacks or actual time travel. A comprehensive overview of the Last War provides details on the events, armies, battlefields, and themes of Eberron's greatest clash of nations.

== Publication history ==
The Forge of War was written by James Wyatt, Ari Marmell, Wolfgang Baur, and published in June 2007. Cover art was by Wayne Reynolds, with interior art by David Bircham, Tomm Coker, Arnold Doong, Tomás Giorello, Fred Hooper, Ron Lemen, Howard Lyon, Lucio Parrillo, Jim Pavelec, Martina Pilcerova, Franz Vohwinkel, and James Zhang.
