= Dragonmarked =

Tabletop role-playing game supplement

- Genre: Role-playing game
- Publisher: Wizards of the Coast
- Publication date: November 2006
- Media type: Print
- ISBN: 0-7869-3933-8

Dragonmarked is a supplement to the 3.5 edition of the Dungeons & Dragons role-playing game.

== Contents ==
Dragonmarked is an accessory for the Eberron setting that details each of the thirteen dragonmarked houses and presents advice for playing dragonmarked character within a house or house guild. The book introduces new options for dragonmarked player characters, including prestige classes, feats, and spells. The book also discusses aberrant dragonmarks and their role in the campaign.

== Publication history ==
Dragonmarked was written by Keith Baker, C.A. Suleiman, and Michelle Lyons, and published in November 2006. Cover art was by Wayne Reynolds, with interior art by Mitch Cotie, Rick Drennan, Gonzalo Flores, Tomás Giorello, John Hodgson, Fred Hooper, Ron Lemen, Howard Lyon, Warren Mahy, Lucio Parrillo, and Anne Stokes.

== Reviews ==
- The Geek Gazette (Issue 5 - Feb 2007)
