= Secrets of Xen'drik =

2006 role-playing game supplement

- Genre: Role-playing game
- Publisher: Wizards of the Coast
- Publication date: July 2006
- Media type: Print
- ISBN: 0-7869-3916-8

Secrets of Xen'drik is a supplement to the 3.5 edition of the Dungeons & Dragons role-playing game.

== Contents ==
Secrets of Xen'drik is an accessory for the Eberron setting that explores the continent of Xen'drik, with its shattered cities and vast dungeons which hold the secrets of countless fallen empires. This book contains a comprehensive overview of Xen'drik and the gateway city of Stormreach. It includes new feats, prestige classes, spells, equipment, and magic items. It also provides encounters and magical locations that can be dropped into existing campaigns, as well as ready-to-play adventures, monsters, and villains.

Secrets of Xen'drik introduced the concept of encounter traps, which function more like combat encounters than normal traps, and later appeared in Dungeonscape in an entire chapter devoted to traps.

== Publication history ==
Secrets of Xen'drik was written by Keith Baker, Jason M. Bulmahn, and Amber E. Scott, and published in July 2006. Cover art was by Wayne Reynolds, with interior art by Andy Brase, Mitch Cotie, Eric Deschamps, Steve Ellis, Wayne England, Jason Engle, John Hodgson, Ron Lemen, Lucio Parrillo, Mark Tedin, and Franz Vohwinkel.
