= Explorer's Handbook =

Game manual by Rich Burlew

- Author: Frank Brunner, Rich Burlew, and David Noonan
- Genre: Role-playing game
- Publisher: Wizards of the Coast
- Publication date: August 2005
- Media type: Print (Hardback)
- ISBN: 0-7869-3691-6

The Explorer's Handbook is a game manual for the Eberron campaign setting of the 3.5 edition of the Dungeons & Dragons fantasy role-playing game.

== Contents ==
The Explorer's Handbook is a book for exploration for both DMs and players.

== Publication history ==
The book was designed by Frank Brunner, Rich Burlew (author of The Order of the Stick webcomic), and David Noonan, and was published in August 2005. Cover art was by Wayne Reynolds, with interior art by Anne Stokes, Draxhall Jump Entertainment, Eric Deschamps, Francis Tsai, Howard Lyon, Igor-Alban Chevalier, Mark Tedin, and Steve Prescott.

== Reception ==
The reviewer from Pyramid commented: "When Wizards picked up the Eberron line, you knew there'd be a slew of what to see, where to go, who to kill supplements. We've seen a few, but for general interest, the Explorer's Handbook is a good reference." The reviewer also noted that "This book begins with one of the best introductions ever and ends with the treasures your journeys rightfully earn you. In between it takes a broad view, going wide and surprisingly deep ... and you're halfway through the book before you get into specific hotspots."

== Reviews ==
- Black Gate #9 (Fall 2005)
