= Dungeons & Dragons: Dragonshard =

2005 video game

- Developer: Liquid Entertainment
- Publisher: Atari
- Platform: Windows
- Release: NA: September 27, 2005; EU: November 4, 2005
- Genres: Real-time strategy Role-playing
- Modes: Single-player, multiplayer

Dungeons & Dragons: Dragonshard is a real-time strategy role-playing video game developed by Liquid Entertainment and published by Atari for Microsoft Windows in September 2005. It takes place in Eberron, one of the official Dungeons & Dragons campaign settings.

The game combines elements of traditional real-time strategy gameplay with role-playing elements such as hero units, and questing. Dragonshard includes two single-player campaigns, single-player skirmish maps, and multiplayer support. The single-player campaign follows the struggles of three competing factions to gain control of a magical artifact known as the Heart of Siberys.

== Gameplay ==
Dragonshard combines aspects of real-time strategy (RTS) and role-playing games (RPGs). Games take place on dual level maps divided into the surface world of Eberron, and the underground realm of Khyber. Units travel between the surface, and the underground through gateways that are fixed on each map. The surface map features traditional RTS gameplay: the player builds and develops base structures, gathers resources, and amasses, and upgrades an army. Unlike most real-time strategy games, all units are available at the beginning of the game, rather than having prerequisites to allow their construction. There are three player-controllable factions in the game: the Order of the Flame, the Lizardfolk, and the Umbragen.

Armies consist of the following unit types:

- Champions: the game's hero unit. In campaign mode, the player chooses a champion before starting a map. In skirmish, and multiplayer modes, the player summons a champion from the city headquarters. Each race has four champions: a fighter, a cleric, a wizard, and a rogue. Each champion offers unique abilities, and army bonuses.
- Juggernauts: powerful, expensive units summoned from the city headquarters. Each race has a unique juggernaut unit, and only one may be summoned at a time, but they cannot venture into the underworld.
- Captains: upgradeable units trained from unit-producing structures. Captains can be upgraded to level five. As they gain levels, they get new abilities, and also gain a squad of subordinate soldiers, up to a maximum of four soldiers at level five. All races have a variety of different captains, including flying units, tanks, rogues, healers, resource gathering specialists, spell-casters, and ranged combatants.
- Soldiers: support troops that are automatically trained by captains when in the vicinity of one of the player's bases. Soldiers cannot be ordered individually; they automatically follow their captain, which allows for large armies to be created with less micromanagement than in typical RTS games. Soldiers always take damage before their captains, and effectively multiply the captain's health as well as damage potential. Since soldiers cannot go underground, each soldier is converted into additional health for the captain. The captain's health is converted back into soldiers when the unit emerges on the surface.

Only champions and ground-based captains can travel underground, which focuses underground gameplay on a party of individual units rather than the surface world's squad-based armies, and plays more like a role-playing game. Underground maps feature party-based dungeon crawling gameplay: units must negotiate traps, gather treasure, and hunt monsters. Items are stored in a global inventory accessible to all units.

Dragonshard has three resources:

- Dragonshards: used to construct units and buildings. Dragonshards periodically rain from the sky to the surface map.
- Gold: used to construct units and buildings. Buildings generate a small amount of gold over time, but the majority of gold in the early to mid-game is gathered by exploring the underground map for treasure, completing quests and looting corpses.
- Experience points: used to upgrade troops. Experience points are gained by killing units, destroying buildings, and completing quests.

=== Buildings ===
Possible locations for bases and expansions are predetermined by the map. Furthermore, each base or expansion is self-contained, with individual buildings placed on a fixed grid behind protective walls. The limited size of each base places strategic limitations on the makeup of the player's army.

=== Experience points ===
Experience points in Dragonshard are assigned to a global pool. The player spends experience points at unit-producing structures to level up captains. Once the player levels up a captain type, all captains of that type belonging to the player are leveled up, and new captains of the type start at the upgraded level. To train a captain above level two, the player must build two or more unit-producing structures of the same type in the same group of four building pads. To reach the maximum captain level of five, the player must fill a group of four building pads with four unit-producing structures of the same type. Instead of filling a group of four pads to maximize a captain's level, the player may opt to build one or more monuments that grant bonuses to all unit types produced from adjacent buildings. Champions do not level up but they can be upgraded in campaign mode with "Champion Artifacts".

=== Game modes ===
Dragonshard has single-player campaigns for the Order of the Flame and Lizardfolk factions, each of which includes seven missions, plus single-player and multiplayer skirmish maps. Single-player campaign maps feature main quest goals that advance the storyline and optional side-quests that provide bonuses such as inventory items, experience points, gold, and Champion Artifacts. Unused items are stored in an item vault between missions. Upon completion of a campaign map, players earn "Reward Points" depending on how skillfully they played. Reward Points can be spent between campaigns to buy items from the item vault or upgrade champions with additional Champion Artifacts.

Single-player and multiplayer skirmish games have one mandatory and three optional win conditions:

- Raze - destroy all enemy buildings. This condition cannot be disabled.
- Expansion - control over 50% of expansion bases for a set period of time.
- Artifacts - collect artifacts randomly dropped by monsters. The first player to reach the target number of artifacts wins.
- Control - control over 50% of a map's "Places of Power" (shrines that a player can capture) for a set period of time.

== Plot ==
Dragonshard takes place in the world of Eberron. In the creation myth of Eberron, the dragon Khyber warred with his sister Siberys and shattered her body to pieces. In his anger, Khyber's brother Eberron wrapped him in his coils, trapping Khyber. The bodies of the three dragons became the three parts of Eberron's world: the surface Eberron, the Ring of Siberys that encircles Eberron, and the underworld of Khyber. The three world parts produce dragonshards, crystal and rock fragments imbued with magic power.

The Heart of Siberys is the largest dragonshard in Eberron. When it fell from the Ring of Siberys to the continent of Xen'drik, it created a storm-swept mountain range known as the Ring of Storms and caused a city to sink into the earth. Its immense magical force caused the natural creatures of the Ring of Storm to evolve into the Lizardfolk. To this day, the Heart draws factions into conflict over control of its power.

In addition to the playable races, Eberron is populated by a number of neutral non-player factions and creatures, including the illithids, longtime foes of the Umbragen, a host of golems constructed by an extinct elven race, ettins, and thri-kreen.

Dragonshard is the first video game set in the Dungeons & Dragons campaign setting of Eberron. Eberron's creator Keith Baker wrote the storyline for Dragonshard, but some discrepancies exist between the game and the canonical Eberron Campaign Setting. Siberys dragonshards should be gold in color, but they are blue in the game. Building new warforged is forbidden under the Treaty of Thronehold that ended the Last War — the only sources for new warforged are Merrix d'Cannith's illegal forge in Sharn and the Lord of Blades' forge in the Mournland. In the game however, the Order faction can build Warforged Titans.

=== Order of the Flame ===
The Order of the Flame is the military wing of the Church of the Silver Flame, an organization dedicated to banishing evil. The Order of the Flame is an alliance of cultures and traditions including humans, dwarves, halflings, and celestials. Led by the cleric Lady Marryn and guided by the Dwarven shaman Amathor, the Order travelled to the Ring of Storms to capture the Heart of Siberys and claim its magical power, but were annihilated by the Lizardfolk in a cataclysmic battle for the Heart of Siberys. Amathor, the Titan Bastion and barely an eighth of the original population of the Order's followers escaped to their spaceports so that they could evacuate from Eberron and set course for pastures new. The Order of the Flame can recruit Archons of the heavens, mighty Warforged Titans, fierce Sorcerers and Deathless Guardians.

=== Umbragen ===
The Umbragen are rumored to be the remnants of a race of elves that inhabited the ancient city Qalatesh. Qalatesh was destroyed and sank into Khyber after an apocalyptic shard storm, some survivors of the storm fled into Khyber. To survive against the horrors of Khyber, these elves harnessed Khyber's dark energies and integrated them into their culture, becoming the Umbragen. Led by the evil Satros, their goal is to drain the Heart of its power and use it to unlock the secrets of the ruins of Qalatesh. The Umbragen has dark shadow creatures, including flying demons and knights of darkness.

=== Lizardfolk ===
The lizardfolk are the native inhabitants of the Ring of Storms. They are rumored to have been placed in the region by dragons to protect the Heart of Siberys. Over time, exposure to the energies of the Heart altered them and granted them sentience. They were united by the hero Darroc, who sacrificed his life to defend the Heart from Order of the Flame invaders. The lizardfolk lived in peace for centuries since Darroc's death, but the Order and Umbragen incursions forced them to take up arms again. Darroc was resurrected later on by the four greatest living heroes of the Lizardfolk people; Redfang the Drakelord, Silverblade the Yuan-ti Pureblood, Wowen the High Shaman and Blackclaw the Master of Decay, and oversaw the bonding of the War Feldrakes for use in the coming war, but was later destroyed for the second and last time when the Ilithid Enchanter Orobus pulled down an especially huge Dragonshard that smashed Darroc's avatar to pieces. Lizardfolk focus on brute force, with units such as giant turtles and dragons.

== Reception ==
Reception

Aggregate scores
Aggregator	Score
GameRankings	79%
Metacritic	80/100

Dragonshard received generally positive reviews from the gaming press. The game was praised for blending traditional real-time strategy with D&D role-playing elements. The main criticism for the game was that it had a short single-player mode, underscored by the complete lack of an Umbragen campaign.

The editors of Computer Games Magazine named Dragonshard the sixth-best computer game of 2005. They wrote, "As an attempt at recapturing the energy of those dorky all-night D&D sessions, it knocks more ideas out of the park than most games even bother to swing at."

== See also ==
- List of Dungeons & Dragons video games
