= Expedition to Castle Ravenloft =

Dungeons & Dragons adventure module

- Expedition to Castle Ravenloft cover.
- Rules required: Dungeons & Dragons version 3.5
- Authors: Bruce R. Cordell and James Wyatt
- First published: 2006

Expedition to Castle Ravenloft is a module for the Dungeons & Dragons (D&D) role-playing game, released in October 2006 by Wizards of the Coast.

== Contents ==
Expedition to Castle Ravenloft is a 226-page hardcover book, released as an updated and expanded version of the original Ravenloft module for the D&D v3.5 ruleset. This returned the adventure to its roots, stripping the demiplane setting of the Ravenloft campaign. This expanded version was designed to be able to run a mini-campaign for about 20 sessions taking characters from level 6 to 10, with options for instead running long (8 session), short (4 session) or single session adventures. It includes suggestions for incorporating the adventure into an existing generic, Forgotten Realms, Eberron or d20 Modern campaign, but makes no mention of doing so in a Ravenloft campaign setting.

== Publication history ==
The module was designed by Bruce R. Cordell and James Wyatt. It was published in October 2006. Cover art was by Kev Walker, with interior art by Dave Allsop, Kalman Andrasofsky, Ralph Horsley, William O'Connor, Lucio Parrillo, Anne Stokes and Eva Widermann.

Expedition to Castle Ravenloft reimagines the original Ravenloft adventure, and does not make use of any other Ravenloft material but rather incorporates new design from Bruce Cordell and James Wyatt intended to complement material from the original adventure.

== Legacy ==
In his 2011 book, Shannon Appelcline discussed how Dungeons & Dragons edition 3.0 had only lasted three years, and that by 2006 players started to wonder if Wizards of the Coast might be preparing a fourth edition of Dungeons & Dragons: "The release of Expedition to Castle Ravenloft (2006) might just have offered another clue to the changing winds that lay ahead. First, it was a new line for 3.5e, suggesting that their original series of 3.5e books was coming to an end. Second, it was a fond look back at one of the most notable adventures from the AD&D days, just the sort of thing that Wizards published in the waning days of 2e. More Expedition books followed the next year, including Expedition to the Ruins of Greyhawk (2007), a long-awaited return to the most famous dungeon in roleplaying." Appelcline later noted that, once fourth edition was officially announced: "The Expedition books that had begun publication in 2006 were revealed to indeed be part of Wizard's slow slide into 4e."

== Reception ==
TheGamer in 2022 ranked it as #4 on their list of "The Best 3.5 Edition Adventures".

== Reviews ==
- "Pyramid: Pyramid Review: Expedition to Castle Ravenloft (for Dungeons & Dragons)". Sjgames.com. 2007-02-23.
- Coleção Dragon Slayer
- Realms of Fantasy
