= Eyes of the Lich Queen =

Dungeons & Dragons adventure module

- Rules required: Dungeons & Dragons, 3.5 edition
- Character levels: 5th
- Authors: Nicolas Logue; Stephen Schubert; Tim Hitchcock
- First published: April 2007

Eyes of the Lich Queen is an adventure module for the 3.5 edition of the Dungeons & Dragons fantasy role-playing game.

== Plot summary ==
Eyes of the Lich Queen takes place in the Eberron setting. The player characters mount an expedition to explore an ancient jungle temple, which sends them headlong into a search for the Dragon's Eye, an artifact created ages ago by demons to gain power over dragons.

== Publication history ==
Eyes of the Lich Queen was written by Stephen Schubert, Nicolas Logue, and Tim Hitchcock, and was published in April 2007. Cover art was by Wayne Reynolds, with interior art by Ron Lemen, Lucio Parrillo, Francis Tsai, Anthony S. Waters.

== Reception ==
Tim Janson of mania.com comments: "There's a lot to do in Eyes of the Lich Queen and it need not be followed in linear fashion... again, a skilled DM can really make this a great time for the players. There are scores of maps in the book! I personally don't play Eberron, but as I said, it's no big deal to drop this into, say, a Forgotten Realms campaign or even one of your own designs."

TheGamer in 2022 ranked it as #1 on their list of "The Best 3.5 Edition Adventures".
