= City of Stormreach =

2008 role-playing game supplement

- Genre: Role-playing game
- Publisher: Wizards of the Coast
- Publication date: February 2008
- Media type: Print
- ISBN: 978-0786948031

City of Stormreach is a supplement to the 3.5 edition of the Dungeons & Dragons role-playing game.

== Contents ==
City of Stormreach is an accessory for the Eberron setting that describes the shadowy ruins, sinister organizations, and treasure-laden dungeons that make Stormreach such an appealing destination for player characters. In addition to providing Dungeon Masters with a richly detailed city for their Xen'drik based campaigns, this supplement presents information on the movers and shakers of Stormreach, ready-to-use adversaries, adventure hooks, and location maps.

== Publication history ==
City of Stormreach was published in February 2008. While this supplement was released "near the end of 3.5e D&D", it was also compatible with the subsequent Dungeons & Dragons 4th Edition "through web updates".

The supplement was written by Keith Baker, Nicolas Logue, James "Grim" Desborough, and C.A. Suleiman. Cover art was by Steve Prescott, with interior art by David Esbrí, Tomás Giorello, Ron Lemen, William O'Connor, Lucio Parrillo, Steve Prescott, Francis Tsai, Franz Vohwinkel, Kieran Yanner, and James Zhang.
