= Sharn: City of Towers =

2004 role-playing game supplement

- Genre: Role-playing game
- Publisher: Wizards of the Coast
- Publication date: November 2004
- Media type: Print
- ISBN: 0-7869-3434-4

Sharn: City of Towers is a supplement to the 3.5 edition of the Dungeons & Dragons role-playing game.

== Contents ==
Sharn: City of Towers is an accessory for the Eberron campaign setting that details Sharn, the most spectacular city of Khorvaire.

== Publication history ==
Sharn: City of Towers was written by Keith Baker and James Wyatt, and published in November 2004 by Wizards of the Coast. Cover art is by Wayne Reynolds, with interior art by Jason Alexander, Tomm Coker, Eric Deschamps, Tomas Giorello, Howard Lyon, Charles P. Morrow, Lucio Parrillo, Steve Prescott, Francis Tsai, Anne Stokes, Anthony Waters, and James Zhang.

According to designer Keith Baker, "Sharn has always been a central part of the setting, and we'd put a lot of thought into it long before we started working on Sharn: City of Towers. Some of the organizations you'll find in Sharn were developed in the ten-page setting proposal way back in 2002."

== Reception ==
The reviewer from Pyramid commented that: "The darkness that Wizards of the Coast tried for (and missed) in the Eberron core rulebook is actually starting to take shape in the second hardback in the series. Sharn: City of Towers brings more of that Dashiell Hammett feel to the surface by touring through the many levels of the lofty city."
