= The City of Towers =

2005 fantasy novel

- Author: Keith Baker
- Language: English
- Series: The Dark Dreaming
- Genre: Fantasy
- Published: 2005
- Publisher: Wizards of the Coast
- Publication place: United States
- Media type: Print (Paperback)
- ISBN: 0-7869-3584-7
- Followed by: The Shattered Land

The City of Towers is a fantasy novel written by Keith Baker and published by Wizards of the Coast (WotC) in 2005 that is set in the world of Eberron. The first novel in "The Dreaming Dark" trilogy, it is based on the third edition of the Dungeons & Dragons role-playing game.

== Plot summary ==
Daine, Pierce, Jode, and Lei, four soldiers inured to combat during the Last War, arrive in Sharn, the fabled City of Towers, to try and eke out some sort of living. They eventually take on the task of finding a missing courier, who was carrying powerful objects that, in the wrong hands, could plunge all of Eberron into chaos and darkness.

== Publication history ==
In 2002, WotC held a competition to find the next campaign world for D&D. From 15,000 submissions, Keith Baker's world of Eberron was chosen. After this new world was published by WotC in 2002, Baker wrote several novels set in Eberron, the first being The City of Towers, which WotC published in 2005. Baker wrote two more novels in the Dreaming Dark trilogy, The Shattered Land (2006), and The Gates of Night (2006).

== Reception ==
In the June 2005 issue of Chronicle, Don D'Ammassa noted "Although the writing is a little awkward at times, the world building is better than average and Baker did a good job of making me actually see the world his characters were playing in."

Writing for SF Site, Craig Shackleton commented, "Baker's characters are solid and believable, with real personalities and personal stories ... Early in the novel, some of the inter-character friction seems a bit stilted, but as the characters develop, all of their interactions become more natural." Shackleton liked the "grittier edge" to the novel, noting "It's refreshing to see a fantasy world in which the impoverished underclass is truly downtrodden and living in filth and misery." Shackleton also thought "The action is well written, and I'm inclined to believe that Baker actually knows something about sword-combat." Shackleton concluded, "While I enjoyed City of Towers a great deal, I don't want to give the wrong impression; it is not deep art. It's a fun, fast-paced adventure with interesting characters and setting, and enough grit and dark tone for me to take it seriously."
