= Keith Baker (game designer) =

American writer and game designer

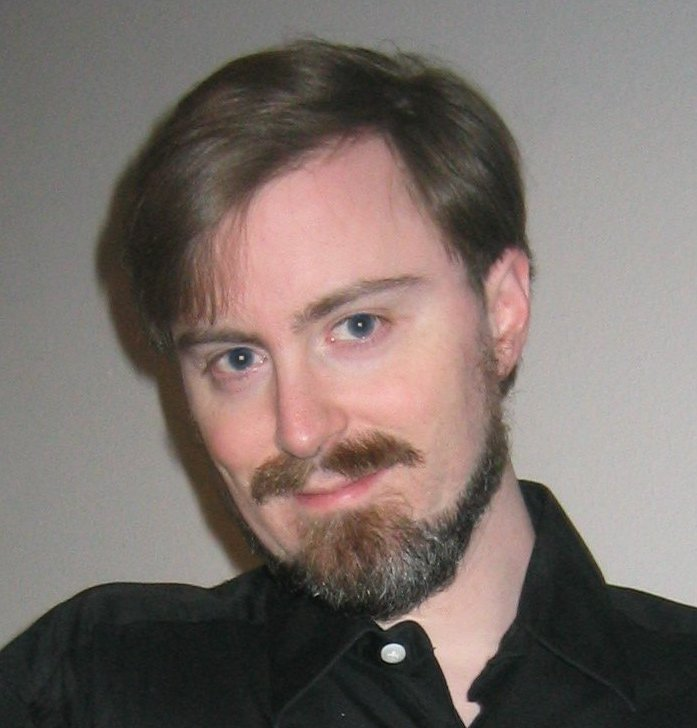
- Keith Baker in 2005
- Occupations: Writer, game designer
- Spouse: Jenn Ellis
- Writing career
- Genres: Role-playing games, fantasy
- Notable works: Eberron, Gloom, Illimat
- Notable awards: 2004 Origins Award Best Roleplaying Game Supplement, 2005 Origins Award Traditional Card Game of the Year
- Website: keith-baker.com

Keith Baker is an American game designer and fantasy novel author. In addition to working with Wizards of the Coast on the creation of Eberron, he has also contributed material for Goodman Games, Paizo Publishing and Green Ronin Publishing. In 2014, Baker and Jennifer Ellis co-founded the indie tabletop game company Twogether Studios.

== Personal life ==
Baker lives in Portland, Oregon. He has a tattoo of the Greater Mark of Making on his right arm. He is married to product designer Jenn Ellis.

== Career ==
Prior to working in the role-playing game industry, he worked in the video game industry with Magnet Interactive Studios and a Colorado company, VR1.

Keith Baker started as a freelancer known for his work at Atlas Games. His Dungeons & Dragons campaign setting of Eberron was chosen as the winner among the 11,000 submissions to the Wizards of the Coast Fantasy Setting Search in 2002. Baker designed the Eberron Campaign Setting (2004) book with James Wyatt and Bill Slavicsek, the first book to focus on the background of the setting.

Baker has been a role-playing game designer across multiple systems besides Dungeons & Dragons, including systems such as Pathfinder, 13th Age (2012) and Titansgrave: The Ashes of Valkana (2015). Essays by Baker on role-playing design and other game features have been published in the Kobold Guides series - including Adventures (2008), Complete Kobold Guide to Game Design (2012), The Kobold Guide to Worldbuilding (2012), and Kobold Guide to Gamemastering (2017).

=== Eberron ===
Baker continued to be a game designer on several 3.5 edition supplements for the Eberron setting such as Sharn: City of Towers (2004), Secrets of Xen'drik (2006), and Secrets of Sarlona (2007). Baker also wrote The Dreaming Dark trilogy of novels set in the Eberron setting, which was published by Wizards of the Coast from 2005 to 2006. Baker wrote a second trilogy, the Thorn of Breland series, of Eberron novels for Wizards of the Coast from 2008 to 2010. For the 4th edition of Dungeons & Dragons, Baker was a designer on the Eberron Campaign Guide (July 2009) and a consultant on the Eberron Player's Guide (June 2009).

In 2017, Baker joined the podcast Manifest Zone which explores the world of Eberron including lore and official products. His co-hosts were Wayne Chang and Kristian Serrano.

For the 5th edition of Dungeons & Dragons, Baker was the lead designer of Wayfinder's Guide to Eberron (July 2018) which was an official Wizards of the Coast supplement published as a PDF on the Dungeon Masters Guild. The Dungeon Masters Guild, owned by OneBookShelf, is an online store that hosts official Wizards of the Coast products and acts as "a platform for players to publish lore, maps, character designs and adventures based on Dungeons & Dragons intellectual property". Utilizing the Dungeon Masters Guild, Baker then published two non-official Eberron themed adventures in 2018 and a non-official 5th edition Eberron supplement in 2019.

Baker was also one of the lead designers of the first hardcover 5th edition Eberron sourcebook, Eberron: Rising from the Last War (November 2019). In the following year, Baker released two new non-official 5th edition Eberron products on the Dungeon Masters Guild: a campaign guide, Exploring Eberron (July 2020), and a supplement, Eberron Confidential (November 2020). In December 2020, Baker announced two upcoming Eberron projects which would also be released on the Dungeon Masters Guild in 2022: Frontiers of Eberron: Threshold and codenamed Project: Fool's Platinum. In November 2022, Baker announced that Frontiers of Eberron: Threshold had been delayed due to the COVID-19 pandemic and was now scheduled for release in 2023. However, the release of Chronicles of Eberron (2022) was not delayed and was published in December 2022.

In January 2023, Baker wrote that he was considering a shift away from creating third-party Eberron products and instead concentrating on expanding aspects of Threshold that are unconnected to Eberron's fictional canon, allowing him to release it as his own intellectual property. In June 2023, Baker announced that his third-party Eberron publishing imprint KB Presents would be shutting down and Visionary Production and Design would take over the stewardship of the Eberron products published on the Dungeon Masters Guild. As part of this handover, a final Eberron product – Frontiers of Eberron: Quickstone – was also announced; the Player's Handbook (2024) compatible sourcebook was released in September 2024.

=== Twogether Studios ===
In 2014, Baker co-founded a new an indie tabletop game studio with his wife, Jennifer Ellis. In April 2015, Twogether Studios launched their first game, Phoenix: Dawn Command, on Kickstarter and raised $67,284. Phoenix: Dawn Command is a card-based roleplaying game where players become "more powerful each time they fall in battle".

In October 2016, Twogether Studios launched their second game, Illimat, on Kickstarter and raised $418,628. This set collection game was designed in partnership with the band The Decemberists and illustrated by Carson Ellis. Steve Haske, for Inverse, wrote: "Last year, the band's Chris Funk got in touch with Portland-based Twogether Studios, in order to bring Illimat into the real world via a Kickstarter campaign. With game designer Keith Baker (co-founder of Twogether), the two designed a relatively simple game played with cards, a few tokens, and a rotating box — the Illimat itself, that changes the 'seasons' of the gameplay — so appropriate to The Decemberists's old-world aesthetic that it has a fascinating sense of authenticity".

Twogether Studios has launched two more successfully funded card games on Kickstarter: Action Cats! (July 2017, raised $17,086) and Action Pups! (February 2019, raised $7,273). Both games feature photos of pets that Kickstarter backers submitted.

In September 2019, it was announced that Twogether Studios was working with the McElroy family to create a cooperative storytelling card game adaptation of The Adventure Zone called TAZ: Bureau of Balance. After its release in 2020, CBR called it "a great way to bring the joy of The Adventure Zone to the table and get in on the action". Io9 highlighted that it "is a great card game for folks wanting to try out (or get back into) RPGs, or more seasoned players who want a cooperative storytelling experience that takes out some of the legwork and guesswork for an afternoon. It's not going to give you all the thrills and chills of a traditional RPG, but it does enough to simulate the experience". In 2020, Twogether Studios worked with Podium Audio to release the Ascend Online Roleplaying Game, "a micro roleplaying game", based on the audiobook series of the same name by author Luke Chmilenko. Io9 reported that "Ascend Online is about a group of friends who've gotten more than they bargained for in an immersive fantasy video game" and that it is "a mix between Ready Player One and Sword Art Online"; the free "micro RPG lets players create a party and explore the series' world, creating their own collaborative adventure along the way".

In July 2025, Darrington Press announced that Baker and Ellis are creating a "new world" with player options for the tabletop role-playing game Daggerheart. In October 2026, Twogether Studios launched a crowdfunding campaign for Eidolon: The Ghost Market, a gothic ecto-punk setting sourcebook for Daggerheart. It surpassed its fundraising goal before the campaign finished.

=== Awards ===
Baker has won an Origins Award twice, first in 2004 for Best Roleplaying Game Supplement as part of the team for the Eberron campaign setting, then alone in 2005 for Traditional Card Game of the Year for Gloom, published by Atlas Games.

Baker was part of the design team for the Pathfinder campaign supplement The Inner Sea World Guide which won 2011 ENnie for Best Art, Interior - Gold Winner and for Best Setting - Gold Winner. The book was also nominated for: 2011 ENnie for Product of the Year, 2011 Golden Geek Best RPG Artwork/Presentation, and 2011 Golden Geek Best RPG Supplement Nominee.

Two of the Kobold Guides anthologies Baker has contributed to have won ENnie awards: Complete Kobold Guide to Game Design (2012 ENnie for Best RPG Related Product - Gold Winner) and The Kobold Guide to Worldbuilding (2013 ENnie for Best RPG Related Product - Gold Winner and for Best Writing - Gold Winner).

Baker contributed design to the 13th Age Core Book which won the 2014 ENnie for Best Rules - Silver Winner and was nominated for 2013 Golden Geek Best RPG Artwork/Presentation Nominee, 2013 Golden Geek RPG of the Year Nominee, 2014 ENnie for Best Game.

== Selected role-playing game credits ==
=== Eberron ===
==== Accessories ====
- Eberron Campaign Setting, with Bill Slavicsek and James Wyatt (Wizards of the Coast, June 2004, ISBN 0-7869-3276-7)
- Sharn: City of Towers, with James Wyatt (Wizards of the Coast, November 2004, ISBN 0-7869-3434-4)
- Races of Eberron, with Jesse Decker, Matthew Sernett, and Gwendolyn F.M. Kestrel (Wizards of the Coast, April 2005, ISBN 0-7869-3658-4)
- Player's Guide to Eberron, with James Wyatt, Luke Johnson, and Stan! (Wizards of the Coast, January 2006, ISBN 0-7869-3912-5)
- Secrets of Xen'drik, with Jason Bulmahn and Amber Scott (Wizards of the Coast, July 2006, ISBN 0-7869-3916-8)
- Dragonmarked, with Michelle Lyons and C.A. Suleiman (Wizards of the Coast, November 2006, ISBN 0-7869-3933-8)
- Secrets of Sarlona, with Scott Fitzgerald Gray, Glenn McDonald, and Chris Sims (Wizards of the Coast, February 2007, ISBN 0-7869-4037-9)
- Dragons of Eberron with Scott Fitzgerald Gray, Nicolas Logue, and Amber Scott (Wizards of the Coast, October 2007, ISBN 978-0-7869-4154-4)
- City of Stormreach with Nicolas Logue, James "Grim" Desborough, and C.A. Suleiman (Wizards of the Coast, February 2008, ISBN 978-0-7869-4803-1)
- Eberron Campaign Guide, with James Wyatt (Wizards of the Coast, July 2009, ISBN 978-0-7869-5099-7)
- Wayfinder's Guide to Eberron (5e) with Ruty Rutenberg, Jeremy Crawford, Mike Mearls, Kate Welch (Wizards of the Coast, July 2018, PDF)
- Morgrave Miscellany with Ruty Rutenberg, Greg Marks, Shawn Merwin, Derek Nekritz (Dungeon Masters Guild, March 2019, PDF)
- Eberron: Rising from the Last War with Jeremy Crawford and James Wyatt (Wizards of the Coast, November 2019, ISBN 9780786966899)
- Exploring Eberron with Will Brolley, Laura Hirsbrunner, Wayne Chang (Dungeon Masters Guild and KB Presents, July 2020, PDF and print on demand)
- Eberron Confidential (Dungeon Masters Guild and KB Presents, November 2020, PDF)
- Dread Metrol: Into the Mists with Andrew Bishkinskyi, Imogen Gingell (Dungeon Masters Guild and KB Presents, July 2021, PDF)
- Chronicles of Eberron (Dungeon Masters Guild and KB Presents, December 2022, PDF and print on demand)
- Frontiers of Eberron: Quickstone with Imogen Gingell (Dungeon Masters Guild and Visionary Production and Design, September 2024, PDF and print on demand)
- Exploring Eberron 5.5e (D&D Beyond, Dungeon Masters Guild and Visionary Production and Design, 2026, PDF and print on demand)

==== Adventures ====
- Shadows of the Last War (Wizards of the Coast, July 2004, ISBN 0-7869-3276-7).
- Khyber's Harvest (Wizards of the Coast, June 2009, Free adventure released for Free RPG Day 2009)
- Curtain Call: A Sharn Adventure with Robert Adducci and Wayne Chang (Dungeon Masters Guild, August 2018, PDF)
- Trust No One with Wayne Chang and Anthony Turco (Dungeon Masters Guild, October 2018, PDF)

=== Other ===
- The Complete Guide to Wererats (March 2003, ISBN 978-0-9712767-8-9)
- The Complete Guide to Beholders, with Thomas Denmark and Michael Ericksen (June 2003, ISBN 978-0-9726241-8-3)
- The Complete Guide to Doppelgangers (February 2007, ISBN 978-0-9712767-7-2)
- Creatures of Freeport, with Graeme Davis (May 2004, ISBN 978-1-932442-19-9)
- Crime & Punishment: The Player's Sourcebook of the Law (March 2003, ISBN 1-58978-039-6)
- The Ebon Mirror, a d20 System adventure (January 2002, ISBN 1-58978-010-8)
- Friends of the Dragon, with Will Hindmarch (2004, ISBN 1-58978-054-X)
- The Inner Sea World Guide by James Jacobs with Keith Baker, Wolfgang Baur, Clinton J. Boomer, Jason Bulmahn, Joshua J. Frost, Ed Greenwood, Stephen S. Greer, Jeff Grubb, Michael Kortes, Tito Leati, Mike McArtor, Rob McCreary, Erik Mona, Jason Eric Nelson, Jeff Quick, Sean K. Reynolds, F. Wesley Schneider, Leandra Christine Schneider, David Schwartz, Amber E. Scott, Stan!, Owen K.C. Stephens, Todd Stewart, James L. Sutter, Greg A. Vaughan, Jeremy Walker, and J. D. Wiker (2011, ISBN 978-1601252692)
- The Emerald Spire Superdungeon written by Keith Baker, Rich Baker, Wolfgang Baur, Jason Bulmahn, Ed Greenwood, Tim Hitchcock, James Jacobs, Nicolas Logue, Erik Mona, Frank Mentzer, Chris Pramas, Sean K. Reynolds, F. Wesley Schneider, Michael A. Stackpole, Lisa Stevens, and James L. Sutter (2014, ISBN 978-1601256553)
- 13th Age Core Book credited for "additional design" (2013, ISBN 978-1908983404)
- Titansgrave: The Ashes of Valkana with Leonard Balsera, Logan Bonner, Matt Forbeck, Will Hindmarch, Jackson Lanzing, Nicole Lindroos, Chris Pramas, Robert J. Schwalb, Mike Selinker, Clark Valentine, Wil Wheaton, Ryan Wheaton, and Ray Winninger (2015, ISBN 978-1-934547-65-6)

== Fiction credits ==
=== Eberron ===
==== The Dreaming Dark trilogy ====
- The City of Towers (Keith Baker, February 2005, ISBN 0-7869-3584-7)
- The Shattered Land (Keith Baker, February 2006, ISBN 0-7869-3821-8)
- The Gates of Night (Keith Baker, November 2006, ISBN 0-7869-4013-1)

==== Thorn of Breland trilogy ====
- The Queen of Stone (Keith Baker, November 2008, ISBN 978-0-7869-5009-6)
- Son of Khyber (Keith Baker, November 2009, ISBN 978-0-7869-5234-2)
- The Fading Dream (Keith Baker, October 2010, ISBN 978-0-7869-5624-1)

==== Short stories ====
- "Death at Whitehearth," in Tales of the Last War (April 2006, ISBN 0-7869-3986-9)
- "Principles of Fire," in Dragons: Worlds Afire (June 2006, ISBN 0-7869-4166-9)
- "Shadows of Stormreach," online serial story.

==== Comic books ====
- Eberron: Eye of the Wolf (art by Chris Lie and Rob Ruffolo, Devil's Due Publishing, June 2006)

=== Other ===
==== Short stories ====
- "...And Weave The Spider's Web" - Foreshadows: The Ghosts of Zero (February 2012, ISBN 978-1-4675-1060-8)
