= Fiendish Codex II: Tyrants of the Nine Hells =

2006 role-playing game supplement

- cover of Fiendish Codex II
- Author: Robin D. Laws and Robert J. Schwalb
- Genre: Role-playing game
- Publisher: Wizards of the Coast
- Publication date: December 2006
- Media type: Print (Hardback)
- Pages: 160
- ISBN: 0-7869-3940-0

Fiendish Codex II: Tyrants of the Nine Hells is an optional supplemental source book for the 3.5 edition of the Dungeons & Dragons roleplaying game.

== Contents ==
Tyrants of the Nine Hells expands on previous editions of Dungeons & Dragons supplement books, namely the Book of Vile Darkness. It describes origins of devils, the rise of the most powerful devil, Asmodeus, and the mystery of how he came to the Nine Hells of Baator in the first place.

It also describes in detail each layer of the Hells, such as their physical features, social structure, rulers, and even the personalities of those who rule over each layer respectively.

=== Chapter One: All About Devils ===
This chapter describes the economy and society of the devils in hell, their relationship with demons, their origins, and their soul harvesting of mortals.

=== Chapter Two: The Nine Hells ===
This chapter describes the nine layers of hell; Avernus, Dis, Minauros, Phlegethos, Stygia, Malbolge, Maladomini, Cania, and Nessus.

=== Chapter Three: Game Rules ===
==== New Prestige classes ====
===== Hellbreaker =====
The Hellbreaker specializes in infiltrating the strongholds of devils and relieving them of their treasures. They develop a number of techniques useful for combating the forces of hell. Hellbreakers are always chaotic-good, chaotic-neutral, or chaotic-evil and often start out as rogues or ninjas.

===== Hellfire Warlock =====
Hellfire warlocks belong to a secretive group of specialist warlocks who have mastered hellfire, a dangerous energy found only in hell. As warlocks begin this prestige class and advance in it, they attain greater options in the uses of hellfire.

===== Hellreaver =====
Hellreavers are warriors who are outraged by the actions of devils and their abilities to corrupt and seduce without consequence. They become tremendously effective combatants against devils. Hellreavers are always good-aligned and often start out in a combat-oriented class such as a barbarian, paladin, fighter, ranger, or even as a cleric or monk.

===== Soulguard =====
Soulguards are openly opposed to the practices of the devils and are especially outraged by their foul bargains with mortals and their stealing of souls. They go to great lengths to protect those beset by the power of the Baatezu. Soulguards are almost always paladins or clerics, but they can also be druids or favored souls. Soulguards always have the alignment of either Lawful-good or Lawful-neutral.

=== Chapter Four: Devils ===
This chapter introduces new types of devils including Abishai, Amnizu, Assassin Devil (Dogai), Ayberobos Swarm, Harvester Devil (Falxugon), Hellfire Engine, Kalabon, Legion Devil (Merregon), Malebranche, Narzugon, Nupperibo, Orthon, Paeliryon, Pain Devil (Excruciarch), Pleasure Devil (Brachina), Spined Devil (Spinagon), Steel Devil (Bueroza), and Xerfilstyx.

=== Chapter Five: The Lords of the Nine ===
The lords of the nine layers of Hell are listed and described in this chapter. Each layer has an archdevil that rules it. The ruler of Avernus is Bel, the ruler of Dis is Dispater, the ruler of Minauros is Mammon, the ruler of Phlegethos is Belial and Fierna, the ruler of Stygia is Levistus, the ruler of Malbolge is Glasya, the ruler of Maladomini is Baalzebul, the ruler of Cania is Mephistopheles, and the ruler of Nessus is Asmodeus.

== Publication history ==
Fiendish Codex II was written by Robin D. Laws and Robert J. Schwalb, and was published in December 2006. Cover art was by Raven Mimura, with interior art by Dave Allsop, Thomas M. Baxa, Daarken, Eric Deschamps, Carl Frank, David Griffith, Warren Mahy, Wayne Reynolds, Anne Stokes, Kieran Yanner, and James Zhang.

Robert Schwalb explains how he became involved with this book: "Ever since I became a freelance game designer, I've had a knack for landing jobs that dealt with evil subjects. Chris Perkins pinged me to work on Fiendish Codex I, but tragically I was swamped with a project for another company, and so I had to take a pass. I kicked myself. I wouldn't make that same mistake twice. So, I cleared my decks for this one. [...] As for an interest in devils, I've always been keen on the darker elements in the D&D cosmology. Maybe it's because my mother freaked a bit (hi mom). Devils have been among the coolest for me since I got my hands on the 1st edition Monster Manual. I'm ashamed to admit it, but I've had a fondness for Glasya since Monster Manual 2--what can I say, I like women with horns and tails."

== Reviews ==
- Coleção Dragon Slayer
