= Dragon Magic =

Dungeons & Dragons supplemental sourcebook

- cover of Dragon Magic
- Author: Owen K.C. Stephens, Rodney Thompson
- Genre: Role-playing game
- Publisher: Wizards of the Coast
- Publication date: September 2006
- Media type: Print (Hardback)
- Pages: 160
- ISBN: 0-7869-3936-2

Dragon Magic is an optional supplemental source book for the 3.5 edition of the Dungeons & Dragons fantasy roleplaying game.

== Contents ==
With this book, the player will be able to use dragon magic and learn a lot of other fighting styles from the powerful beasts.

== Publication history ==
Dragon Magic was written by Owen K.C. Stephens and Rodney Thompson, and was published in September 2006. Cover art was by Eric Polak, with interior art by David Bircham, Jeff Carlisle, Carl Critchlow, Daarken, Eric Deschamps, Jeff Easley, Wayne England, E.M. Gist, Brian Hagan, Ralph Horsley, Warren Mahy, Lucio Parrillo, Mike Schley, Arnie Swekel, Francis Tsai, Franz Vohwinkel, David Wahlstrom, Eva Widermann, and James Zhang.
