= Artificer (Dungeons & Dragons) =

Dungeons & Dragons character class

- Dungeons & Dragons character class
- Two artificers, a Battle Smith with their Steel Defender and an Artillerist, as portrayed in Eberron: Rising from the Last War. Illustrated by Paul Scott Canavan.

Editions
- Alternate class: 2nd; v3.5; 4th; 5th; 5.5e

Publication history
- First appearance: Eberron Campaign Setting
- Source books: Player's Option: Spells & Magic; Eberron Campaign Setting; Eberron Player's Guide; Eberron: Rising from the Last War

Grouping
- 2E group: Wizard specialist
- 4E powersource: Arcane
- 4E role: Leader

The artificer is a playable character class in the Dungeons & Dragons (D&D) fantasy role-playing game. While the artificer originally appeared as a subclass for spellcasters in older editions, the artificer first appeared as a full class in the 3.5 edition of D&D.

The standalone artificer was introduced in 2004 as part of Eberron, a new campaign setting for D&D. It is a unique base class that reflects many of the core themes of Eberron. In subsequent D&D editions, the class has appeared in Eberron sourcebooks such as Eberron Player's Guide (2009) for 4th edition and Eberron: Rising from the Last War (2019) and Eberron: Forge of the Artificer (2025) for 5th edition.

== Campaign setting ==
Though introduced as a wizard specialist in Player's Option: Spells & Magic (1996), and as a prestige class for gnome arcane spellcasters in Magic of Faerûn (2001), artificers were first added in 2004 as a standalone class in the Eberron campaign setting. In 2006, Skip Williams explained that the class "represents an approach to magic that's a little different from spellcasting as presented in the Player's Handbook. To an artificer, magic is neither arcane nor divine but a force to be captured and infused into items". He noted that the "core" of the class is as "a master of gadgets", however, the artificer has a range of expressions for players such as "a cool-headed problem solver, an ascetic philosopher, a cunning explorer, a magical dilettante, or a combat magician".

Within the fictional setting, artificers are a major defining feature of a Dragonmarked house, House Cannith, and the common people in the metropolis of Sharn and other cities rely heavily on artificers to maintain the magical infrastructure. Artificers represent many of the high-magic elements of Eberron as a campaign setting.

== Publication history ==
=== Advanced Dungeons & Dragons 2nd edition ===
The first appearance of an artificer was as a wizard specialist introduced in the Advanced Dungeons & Dragons 2nd edition supplement Player's Option: Spells & Magic (1996) where artifice was a newly added specialty within the School of Thaumaturgy. This artificer channels magic into or through non-living items for their own personal use, thus any spells in the Enchantment/Charm school which happen to affect living things, and the entire school of Necromancy, are opposed to the Artifice specialty and off limits to the artificer of AD&D 2nd edition.

=== Dungeons & Dragons 3.5 edition ===
In D&D v3.5, the artificer was introduced as a base class in the Eberron Campaign Setting (2004). No published race has artificer as a favored class, though being a Warforged artificer gives players the advantage of being able to use infusions on themselves.

The artificer's abilities act primarily on items and constructs. The artificer uses Intelligence-based Infusions instead of typical magics and psionics. Infusions work similarly to spells but must be implanted in a specific object, giving it a temporary magic effect. An artificer can create magic items for which he or she does not have access to the prerequisite spells. Artificers receive a number of craft reserve points every level. These points can be used instead of experience points in the creation of new magic items. Thus Artificers are able to make use of item creation feats without the experience penalty that other spell casters must take. Constructs, mechanical beasts, and particularly Warforged fall under the artificer's area of influence. Specific infusions can be cast to repair or inflict damage to any creature with a construct subtype. At fourth level Artificers may craft a homunculus companion. A homunculus is similar to a Wizard's familiar but more intelligent and generally better equipped to a single task.

=== Dungeons & Dragons 4th edition ===
A playtest version of the artificer was collected in Dragon #365 (July 2008). Shannon Appelcline, author of Designers & Dragons, wrote that it "was the first character class to be playtested as part of D&D Insider". The artificer then appeared as an official base class in the Eberron Player's Guide (July 2009). Mechanically, artificers act as arcane leaders. They can use rods, staves, and wands as implements. Artificers can also use arcane spells called infusions to imbue objects with magical power, and focus on buffing, healing and protecting allies. Many of their powers relate to weapons or armor.

Appelcline stated that the official artificer class was updated considerably from its playtest iteration with its healing infusions undergoing "the biggest change" in order "to help differentiate [the artificer] from other leader classes". He noted that Dragon #376 (June 2009) included a "design & development article" focused on the artificer and it included "interesting insights" such as the reason that the artificer's special rules "were replaced by more standard 4e mechanics" was "because the new rules 'didn't amount to enough mechanical benefit'".

=== Dungeons & Dragons 5th edition ===
The 5th edition version of the artificer first appeared in a 2015 Unearthed Arcana playtest as a Wizard subclass before being released as a standalone class in a 2017 Unearthed Arcana playtest. It subsequently went through several rounds of public playtesting. (Note: List of Unearthed Arcana playtests: Eberron (February 2, 2015); Artificer (January 9, 2017); The Artificer Revisited (February 28, 2019); The Artificer Returns (May 14, 2019)) The final version was included in the Eberron: Rising from the Last War (November 2019) campaign book. It was the first base class published for 5th edition since the Player's Handbook (August 2014). It includes three subclasses: the Alchemist, focused on potions and elixirs, the Artillerist, focused on ranged weaponry and defenses, and the Battle Smith, focused on constructs and combat.

In the lead up to publication of Tasha's Cauldron of Everything (2020), an errata for the class was released which updated "several class features, while also streamlining the class a bit to make Artificers easier to play". Tasha's Cauldron of Everything includes the updated version of the class along with an additional subclass, the Armorer; this subclass is focused on armor modifications, becoming one with it, and refining its magical capabilities. The Armorer subclass was originally released in February 2020 as part of the Unearthed Arcana playtest series.

In September 2024, as part of the 2024 revision to the 5th Edition ruleset, the Player's Handbook (September 2024) was released. The backward compatible sourcebook updates preexisting player options while introducing new content to the game. However, the artificer was not included in this update. Then in December 2024, a revised version of the artificer using the 2024 Player's Handbook ruleset was released as an Unearthed Arcana playtest. It included four revised subclasses: Alchemist, Armorer, Artillerist, and Battle Smith. Further playtest adjustments to the class and the new Cartographer subclass were released in February 2025. The setting sourcebook Eberron: Forge of the Artificer (2025) includes the revised artificer class. The sourcebook Ravenloft: The Horrors Within (2026) adds the Reanimator subclass for the Ravenloft setting.

== Reception ==
Chris Przybyszewski, in his review of Eberron Campaign Setting (2004) for the SF Site, stated that he was disappointed by the Artificer in comparison to the new races introduced in the sourcebook. He noted that the class "can create all sorts of magical instruments", however, questioned "what exactly has stopped players from doing this sort of thing in the past" besides not having formal rules. He commented that "there are those players who will be happy to have rules for such things, and the rules are flexible and workable (as the artificer goes up in level, so does her or his ability to make stuff)" but thought "when weighed against the importance of a new world, this new class is weak".

During the 5th edition playtest, Gavin Sheehan of Bleeding Cool wrote "if you happen to remember playing Dungeons & Dragons during the 3.5 Edition phase of the game, you might remember a class called Artificer. [...] Depending on who you ask, the character class was made either to enhance the Eberron campaign at the time, or it was simply put into the game to attract steampunk fans into checking out D&D. We're guessing the truth lies somewhere in the middle. Artificer made it into 4th Edition, but was dropped [when] 5th Edition came out in 2014". Jeremy Thomas, in his review of Eberron: Rising From The Last War for 411Mania, highlighted the multiple playtest iterations Artificer went through before being published in the 5th Edition. He wrote "the version we get rather effectively combines all those elements into a workable, balanced class that feels true to the spirit of the Artificer. Artificers create magical items and use tools to work their magic, and the subclasses (Alchemist, Artillerist, Battle Smith) give an Artificer some distinct roles that they can fill. They're magic users, but they won't be encroaching on the pure destructive power of wizards or sorcerers". Christian Hoffer, for ComicBook.com, similarly highlighted the various playtest iterations and that "the final version contains some notable changes". Hoffer noted the core of Artificer as "a 'half-casting' class" remains and that every subclass "can now create a Homunculus" which previously had been limited to the Alchemist subclass during playtesting. He commented that the Alchemist underwent the "biggest 'nerf'" and was "pretty underpowered" even with its new elixir mechanic. However, besides the Alchemist, Hoffer felt that "the Artificer is a fantastic new class that adds both mechanical flavor and lots of roleplaying options".

Corey Plante, for Inverse, wrote "Why has it taken this long for a new character class, especially one this awesome, to be finalized for D&D 5th edition? The answer is that if you want to tinker with magical inventions, the process takes time. […] Why is now the perfect time for the Artificer's big debut? The answer has surprisingly little to do with the game itself. Instead, it has everything to do with the setting of Eberron in this latest sourcebook.[…] In a world shaped equally by science and magic, there's no better herald than the Artificer". Charlie Hall, in his review of Eberron: Rising From The Last War for Polygon, highlighted potential game balance issues with the Artificer, the first new character class for 5th edition. He wrote "trouble is that one of the big issues with D&D over the years has been magical item spam. […] It got so bad in the 4th edition that the 5th edition introduced a system called 'attunement'. […] The Artificer class will be the first to allow players to attune to more than three magical items at one time. […] I'm just saying, as someone who has DM'd for quite a while now, maybe think twice about allowing an Artificer into your campaign. It might be a bit more trouble than its worth".

Hoffer, for ComicBook.com in 2020, highlighted that the revised version of the class in Tasha's Cauldron of Everything (2020) included changes that "were made mostly to 'future-proof' the Artificer for future editions, such as giving the Artificer the ability to replicate any common magic item, as opposed to only common magic items found in Xanathar's Guide to Everything. [...] None of these changes are exactly groundbreaking or fundamentally shift what the Artificer can do, but they are significant quality of life updates that should make the Artificer a little easier to play". Henry St Leger, for GamesRadar+ in December 2024, commented that the "13th official class is often overlooked. As an arcane engineer that channels magic through gadgets and contraptions, it stands a little outside the most common fantasy adventurer tropes (like 'guy with big sword' or 'orphan thief')". St. Leger noted that while artificer as a character class is "played pretty widely, D&D Beyond still puts it dead last behind the other 12 classes, reporting in 2023 that the Artificer had half the number of players on average than the Monk".

== Other media ==
The artificer appears as a class in Dungeons & Dragons Online (DDO). DDO community manager Amanda Grove said she enjoyed playing the class in the game, although she said using two hands to shoot rather than one was difficult.

Ashe Collins, for DieHard GameFan, wrote "I'm all for the new class, especially since it's the first class we're getting that is specific to the Eberron Campaign Setting, The Artificer. I've loved this class since I first read about it back when we were playing in Eberron, mainly because I love combining magic and technology. It's no wonder that Techno-Mages from the Rifts RPG are some of my favorites to play and have as NPCs. In the setting the Artificer worked as a buffer for the Warforge class, but I'm thinking in the MMO it might cover the whole party. And with Crafting being in the game now, I also can't help but wonder if the class itself might get some kind of bonus to making items or on items. Artificers are an interesting support class but I can see lots of solo builds coming out of it as well".
