= Voyage of the Golden Dragon =

Dungeons & Dragons adventure module

- Rules required: Dungeons & Dragons, 3.5 edition
- Character levels: 7th
- Authors: Nicolas Logue
- First published: April 2006

Voyage of the Golden Dragon is an adventure module for the 3.5 edition of the Dungeons & Dragons fantasy role-playing game.

== Plot summary ==
Voyage of the Golden Dragon takes place in the Eberron setting. The player characters must protect the Golden Dragon - once a skyfaring warship, now a symbol of peace among the Five Nations of Khorvaire - on its maiden voyage as pirates, thieves, and saboteurs conspire to defame, steal, or destroy it.

== Publication history ==
Voyage of the Golden Dragon was written by Nicolas Logue, and was published in April 2006. Cover art was by Wayne Reynolds, with interior art by Steve Prescott.
