= Gloom (card game) =

2004 card game

- Designers: Keith Baker
- Publishers: Atlas Games
- Players: 2-4 (basic deck)
- Playing time: 30 minutes
- Skills: Storytelling

Gloom is a tabletop card game created by designer Keith Baker and published by Atlas Games in 2004. It won the Origins Award for Best Traditional Card Game in 2005. Four expansion packs have been created since the release of the original game called, Unhappy Homes, Unwelcome Guests, Unquiet Dead and Unfortunate Expeditions. Additionally, In August 2011, Cthulhu Gloom, which serves as either a standalone game or a fifth expansion pack, was released, and one Cthulhu expansion pack has been released, called Unpleasant Dreams.

== Gameplay ==
The game is for two to four players who each are given control of an eccentric family. The object of the game is to lower the self-worth points of the player's own family with cards that cause negative events, eventually killing them. At the same time, positive points are played on opponent's family members. After one family is completely killed off, the player with the lowest Family Value (the total points of all dead family members) is the winner of the game.

== Other Versions ==
Expansion packs are available for the game, which each (except Unquiet Dead) add an additional family and allow for more than 4 players in the game. The packs also include new modifiers and Untimely Deaths. In 2013 a limited number of the TableTop Gloom Promo Expansion was released. Including in the deck are two unwanted guests (TableTop host Wil Wheaton and Felicia Day) that can wander from family to family.

There are also several spin-offs of the game, which are played separately from the original Gloom:

- Cthulhu Gloom uses a Lovecraftian theme for the game. A new element in that game are Story cards, which add special effects through the game, or extra points at the conclusion of the game. Cthulhu Gloom can be played with 5 players without an expansion pack.
- Munchkin Gloom is based on the Munchkin series of card games from Steve Jackson Games. It was released in the summer of 2015.
- Fairytale Gloom brings classic fairy tale characters and other elements to Gloom's unhappy setting. The game was released June 2015.
- Gloom in Space uses science fiction tropes and characters, many of which are nods to sci-fi favorites like Han Solo or The Doctor. It was released in early 2017.

== Critical reception ==
An element of the game that was appreciated by game designer Greg Costikyan was the optional aspect of storytelling involved when playing an event card, where a player can choose to explain the events that happen in the course of the character's life. Costikyan stated that this added "a unique aspect to game play and [made] the game play particularly enjoyable".

== Reviews ==
- Pyramid
- Family Games: The 100 Best
- Rue Morgue #45
