= Shadows of the Last War =

Adventure module for Dungeons & Dragons

- Rules required: Dungeons & Dragons, 3.5 edition
- Character levels: 2nd
- Authors: Keith Baker
- First published: July 2004

Shadows of the Last War is an adventure module for the 3.5 edition of the Dungeons & Dragons fantasy role-playing game.

== Plot summary ==
Shadows of the Last War takes place in the Eberron setting. Agents of the Emerald Claw seek to obtain the secrets to constructing a terrible magic weapon from the ruined House Cannith citadel of Whitehearth.

== Publication history ==
Shadows of the Last War was written by Keith Baker, and was published in July 2004. Cover art was by Wayne Reynolds, with interior art by Tommy Castillo.

== Reception ==
Dungeon Master for Dummies lists Shadows of the Last War as one of the ten best 3rd edition adventures.

TheGamer in 2022 ranked it as #5 on their list of "The Best 3.5 Edition Adventures".
