= Eberron: Rising from the Last War =

Tabletop role-playing game supplement

- Cover of the standard edition
- Rules required: Dungeons & Dragons 5th edition
- Campaign setting: Eberron
- Authors: Jeremy Crawford, James Wyatt, Keith Baker
- First published: November 19, 2019
- ISBN: 9780786966899

Eberron: Rising from the Last War is a sourcebook that details the Eberron campaign setting for the 5th edition of the Dungeons & Dragons fantasy role-playing game. Jeremy Crawford, co-lead designer of the book, said the book "is the size of one of the core rule books of the game, it is jam packed".

== Summary ==
Eberron: Rising from the Last War is a 320-page campaign and adventure guide for using the Eberron setting in the 5th edition. The book includes an overview of the continent of Khorvaire and a 1st-level adventure set in Sharn. It also includes symbiont magic items, 38 monsters/NPCs, maps and other adventure hooks for Dungeon Masters to design their own adventures set in Eberron.

The book expands on game elements for the 5th edition, such as:

- The Artificer class (with three subclasses) - which is the first new character class to be released since the 5th edition was published.
- 16 race/subrace options for players including Dragonmarked, Warforged, Changeling, Kalashtar, Shifter, goblin, bugbear, hobgoblin, and orc.
- Group patrons which act as a background element for the entire party of player characters.

== Publication history ==
The new module was announced on August 19, 2019 and was published on November 19, 2019. An alternate art cover, designed by Vance Kelly, of the book would only be available through local game stores. On September 13, 2019, Greg Tito and Crawford announced a new standard cover for the book which replaced the original design from the announcement. Some material in Eberron: Rising from the Last War was previously published in books such as Volo's Guide to Monsters and Wayfinder's Guide to Eberron.

The book is available as a digital product through the following Wizards of the Coast licensees: D&D Beyond, Fantasy Grounds, and Roll20. Beadle & Grimm, a Wizards of the Coast licensee, also released a limited run special "Gold Edition" of Eberron: Rising from the Last War in February 2020.

== Related products ==
=== Wayfinder's Guide to Eberron ===
The official Eberron update for 5th edition, Wayfinder's Guide to Eberron, was released on July 23, 2018 as a PDF. While the material was for purchase online, it was treated as playtest material similar to the 5th Edition Unearthed Arcana material. In October 2019, Crawford spoke on some key differences between the material in the playtest and the material in Eberron: Rising from the Last War. He highlighted that both the Warforged race and the Artificer class received substantial mechanical updates.

In November 2019, Crawford said "People got to see some of this content last year in our DM's Guild book Wayfinder's Guide to Eberron. And if a person is wondering 'Well, what's the difference between these two products?' Well, if you look at just simply the number of words in the two of them, Eberron: Rising from the Last War, is over two and a half times longer than Wayfinder's Guide to Eberron. People just compare the number of pages. That's misleading because the pages don't have the same number of words on them".

On November 19, 2019 Wayfinder's Guide to Eberron received an update to the following overlapping material and mechanics: player characters (Changeling, Kalashtar, Shifter, Warforged), dragonmarks (12 houses and aberrant), character background (house agent), and the Artificer class (subclass alchemist). Since the official release of Eberron: Rising from the Last War, this material is no longer considered playtest material.

=== D&D Adventurers League ===
The Embers of the Last War storyline was announced on July 31, 2018 as an "exploratory campaign featuring Eberron" for the D&D Adventurers League using the playtest material from Wayfinder's Guide to Eberron. Twelve adventures were published as PDFs between September 2018 and December 2018 and the adventure campaign is set in Sharn.

Oracle of War, the second Eberron themed Adventurers League storyline, was announced on August 19, 2019 and the adventure campaign is set in the Mournland. Shawn Merwin, Adventurers League Resource Manager, wrote that the Oracle of War storyline is a "very different type of campaign from what has come before [in Adventurers League]. The story presented in Oracle of War plays out in 20 Core Storyline adventures that take characters from level 1 to 20. [...] Core Storyline adventures are placed on the DMs Guild at the rate of one per month, giving the campaign an active play period of approximately 2 years". The first release of this storyline was in December 2019 shortly after the release of Eberron: Rising from the Last War.

=== Exploring Eberron ===
Exploring Eberron is a non-official 5th Edition campaign guide by Keith Baker which was published on July 30, 2020 via the Dungeon Masters Guild specific game license. The 247 page sourcebook acts as a companion guide to Eberron: Rising from the Last War and focus on areas less explored in the 3rd, 4th, and 5th Editions. The book also includes lore on the nature of magic in Eberron and the Planes of Eberron, along with 48 pages focused on new 5th Edition character and monster mechanics. Baker wrote that this product "is not produced by WotC and it does not match all previous canon sources" and that this book is his "personal view of Eberron and what he does in his Eberron campaigns".

Jeremy Thomas, for 411Mania, gave the supplement a 10 rating and wrote "while it's not official by Wizards of the Coast standards, Keith Baker and his team of designers have created an astounding book that perhaps does more to make the campaign setting unique since any book since the publishing of the Third Edition campaign setting back in 2004. This is an absolute must-get for anyone who enjoys playing in Eberron and yet will still have a wealth of material for non-Eberron players to enjoy as well. It represents the absolute pinnacle of what the DMs Guild system can accomplish and is as good or better as anything Wizards of the Coast has published for Fifth Edition".

== Reception ==
In Publishers Weekly's "Best-selling Books Week Ending November 23, 2019", Eberron: Rising from the Last War was #7 in "Hardcover Nonfiction".

Charlie Hall, for Polygon, wrote "Eberron is an amazing place, and Wizards of the Coast does an excellent job in this new book explaining it and giving players the tools to have fun there".

Jonathan Bolding, PC Gamer, wrote "The book was released simultaneously in physical form as well as across several of D&D's digital platforms. Prior to this release, Eberron was only available as a short official supplement on DM's Guild, the online D&D content marketplace which also plays host to a load of unofficial Eberron supplements and books from older editions. Rising from the Last War is also available on your virtual tabletop, which is on your PC, which is a place where lots of us play D&D nowadays. I took some time to fiddle around with Roll20's bundle version of the book, which is a pretty slick setup with tokens, maps, and a bit of adventure. Simple to set up and run, which is very good if you want to get some friends and jump into the setting".

Jeremy Thomas, for 411Mania, gave the supplement an 8.5 rating and wrote that the book "delivers on most of what any Eberron player or DM could want in order to create and play in their campaigns" and that "every aspect from Character Creation and the Gazetteer to even the chapter on magic items is focused on giving players and DMs a perspective into how to create new, different campaigns that are not your garden variety dungeon crawls". However, Thomas highlighted that: "all of these new races and subraces were already detailed in The Wayfinder's Guide to Eberron last year. Those offered a few ambitious choices in terms of race design, but they also caused a few awkward interactions with D&D's ruleset. This new book streamlines those options. While this will undoubtedly be a source of dismay for some players — warforged lose some unique aspects and a couple cool features from the other races are gone – it also means they fit far more seamlessly into the 5E rules".
