= Kalman Andrasofszky =

Canadian comic book artist, writer, inker, letterer, penciller and designer

- Born: August 21, 1975 (age 51) Toronto, Ontario
- Areas: Cartoonist, Writer, Penciller, Inker, Editor, Letterer, Colourist
- Notable works: Captain Canuck

Kalman Andrasofszky (born August 21, 1975 in Toronto, Ontario, Canada) is a Canadian comic book artist, writer, inker, letterer, penciller, and designer.

== Career ==
Much of Andrasofszky's work has been in covers for Marvel Comics. He is also known for his design work on the Captain Canuck animated feature and comic series. Andrasofszky wrote the Captain Canuck comics series from Chapterhouse Comics, draws the main covers and was the main artist on the first two issues, Free Comic Book Day #0 issue as well as a story in the 2014 Captain Canuck Summer Special, and acts as editor-in-chief for Chapterhouse Comics.

Andrasofszky is also connected to the R.A.I.D. studio where he works and collaborates with his contemporaries like Ramón K Pérez, Marcus To, Cary Nord, Francis Manapul, Scott Hepburn, and others.

Andrasofszky has also done artwork for Dungeons & Dragons books, including An Adventurer's Guide to Eberron, Champions of Valor, Dungeon Master's Guide II, Eberron Campaign Setting, Faiths of Eberron, Lords of Darkness, Secrets of Sarlona, Serpent Kingdoms, Tome of Battle: The Book of Nine Swords, and Underdark.
