= CA Suleiman =

Writer, game designer, and musician

Colin A. Suleiman is a writer, game designer, and musician who has worked primarily in dark fantasy and horror for role-playing games and fiction. Through the course of his career, he has been a guest of honor or attending professional at over 140 conventions across seven countries.

== Early life and education ==
Suleiman attended the Landon School as a child and Churchill High School, and went to the University of Maryland in the late 1990s.

== Career ==
C.A. Suleiman has made contributions to books for role-playing games such as Dungeons & Dragons and World of Darkness. Suleiman was one of the writers of Vampire: The Requiem and conceived and developed the Mummy: The Curse line.

His D&D work includes City of Stormreach, Cityscape, Dragonmarked, Heroes of Horror, and Faiths of Eberron.

He launched a transmedia fantasy property called The Lost Citadel, based around the meshing of zombie horror and traditional fantasy tropes. The world debuted with a fiction anthology, and then with a Kickstarted game line.

C.A. Suleiman created and developed a Cthulhu Mythos game and setting called Unspeakable: Sigil & Sign, which focuses on the Old One cultists as protagonists.

In late 2017, the Horror Writers Association banned Suleiman from its events in response to accusations of sexual harassment; Green Ronin, publisher of The Lost Citadel fiction anthology and role-playing game, then distanced itself from Suleiman over the same allegations, despite co-owner Nicole Lindroos' maintaining of Suleiman's innocence.

== Music ==
C.A. Suleiman is the founder of the Washington, D.C.–based interstitial rock group Toll Carom.
