= James Desborough (game designer) =

Role-playing game designer

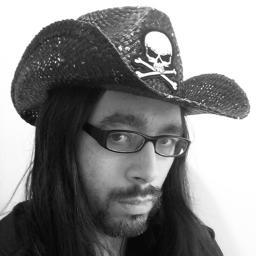
- Born: December 5, 1975 (age 50); Winchester. Hampshire, U.K.
- Other names: Grim
- Occupations: Game designer; author; videographer; podcaster; blogger
- Website: "Postmortem Studios".

James "Grim" Desborough is a British game designer, author, and blogger who has worked primarily on role-playing games, as well as card games, board games, and social computer games.

== Career ==
James Desborough wrote The Munchkin's Guide to Powergaming in 2000/2001, winning an Origins Award for that work along with his co-authors Steve Mortimer and Phil Masters. Desborough was a co-author of CS1: Cannibal Sector One he also briefly worked as the line editor for SLA Industries. Desborough is also the owner of Postmortem Studios. Postmortem Studios was one of Cubicle 7's first company partnerships due to Desborough's connections with Angus Abranson. He later became creative director at Chronicle City, Abranson's new venture but this partnership ended in July 2021.

In 2017 he released a licensed role-playing game based upon John Norman's fantasy series Gor, which also included art by Michael Manning.

Desborough's work was included in Red Phone Box, and in The Mammoth Book of Erotic Romance and Domination. He also self-publishes.

His D&D design work includes Monster Manual V (2007) and City of Stormreach (2008).

Desborough's career has often been characterised by humour and adult content, leading to his role as Games Master for the adult stream 'Tabletopless'. While the stream primarily plays Dungeons and Dragons they have also played Cyberpunk, The Witcher and others.

Desborough has appeared as a commentator on men's issues on The Stream on Al Jazeera.
