= Dave Allsop =

Scottish game designer

Dave Allsop is a Scottish game designer and artist for role-playing games and video games.

== Career ==
Dave Allsop developed the role-playing game SLA Industries (1993); the Scottish company Nightfall Games was founded to publish the game. Wizards of the Coast later bought SLA Industries, but then returned the rights to Nightfall, and they then licensed it to Hogshead Publishing; in 2002, Hogshead closed down and returned SLA Industries to Allsop. Allsop was by then the flatmate of Angus Abranson, and they formed a new role-playing company in 2003 called Cubicle 7 Entertainment. Allsop started work on a new release of SLA Industries, but in the Fall of 2004 Allsop pulled out of Cubicle 7 to explore other opportunities. In 2005, Allsop, with Adrian Bott, produced The Book of Unremitting Horror, a book of monsters for the d20 System, published by Pelgrane Press. Allsop returned to Cubicle 7 in 2007 to work as the line editor for SLA Industries, which started publishing new releases again in 2011.

He is known for his work on the Magic: The Gathering collectible card game. He has also contributed art to the digital collectible card game Hearthstone.

His Dungeons & Dragons work includes interior art for Eberron Campaign Setting (2004), Monster Manual III (2004), Expedition to Castle Ravenloft (2006), Cityscape (2006), Fiendish Codex II: Tyrants of the Nine Hells (2006), Fantastic Locations: City of Peril (2007), Monster Manual V (2007), An Adventurer's Guide to Eberron (2008), the fourth edition Monster Manual (2008), the fourth edition Manual of the Planes (2008), Demon Queen's Enclave (2008), Draconomicon: Metallic Dragons (2009), and Martial Power II (2010).

Allsop was the concept artist for One Thumb Mobile, for their game Celtic Heroes, from 2012 to 2015. He returned to freelance work in February 2015.
