= Warforged =

Character race from the Dungeons & Dragons franchise

- First appearance: Eberron Campaign Setting (2004)

In-universe information
- Created by: Giants of Xen'drik, quori of Dal Quor (original warforged); House Cannith (modern warforged)
- Creation date: -60,000 YK or earlier (original warforged); 959 YK (warforged titans); 965 YK (modern "living construct" warforged)
- Type: Construct (living construct)
- Alignment: Any

The warforged are one of the playable fictional races of creatures in the Eberron campaign setting of the Dungeons & Dragons fantasy role-playing game.

== Publication history ==
The warforged first appeared in third edition for the Eberron setting as a player character race in the Eberron Campaign Setting (2004), which also introduced the warforged titan. The warforged appeared again as a player character race in Monster Manual III (2004), which introduced the warforged charger and the warforged scout. The warforged appeared once more as a player character race for the Eberron setting in Races of Eberron (2005). The psiforged appeared in Magic of Eberron (2005). The warforged scorpion and the quorcraft wargorged template appeared in Secrets of Xen'drik (2006). The warforged raptor appeared in Forge of War (2007).

== Description ==
The warforged are a race of living, sentient constructs, superficially similar to golems. Warforged are composed of a blend of materials: predominantly stone, wood, and some type of metal. In Eberron, they were created by House Cannith in magical 'creation forges' to fight in the Last War, based on technology recovered from Xen'drik. When the Last War ended, they were given their freedom at the Treaty of Thronehold.

While they have no sex, warforged may adopt a gender role as part of their individual personality, particularly among recently constructed models who have spent more of their life mingling with other races. They do not age as the other races do, and with the first true warforged being created only 33 years ago it is not yet known what effects time will have on them; it is stipulated that, like all living creatures, their bodies must experience degradation over time. Like other races, warforged may take levels in any character class, but their starting age is uniquely lower for "complex" classes than for "simple" ones, as warforged with such skillsets were only developed recently.

Racial qualities and adjustments of the warforged were published in the Eberron Campaign Setting and later reprinted in Monster Manual III. Warforged are produced with their own armor and have various immunities, including to poison and disease. Healing spells have reduced effect on warforged, but a series of repair spells work fully on them. Besides the roughly human-sized and -shaped standard model, other published forms of warforged include:

- merchurion (MM5) – massive, extremely powerful constructs of living quicksilver; in Eberron they are an ancient variety of warforged, though their origins in other settings vary.
- quorcraft warforged (SoX) – various ancient models of warforged which are mindless but slightly stronger and sturdier than their modern counterparts.
- warforged charger (MM3) – warforged that are larger than standard designed for brute strength, but have little intelligence.
- warforged raptor (FoW) – warforged resembling giant birds or insects, designed for aerial bombardment; similar in construction to warforged titans.
- warforged scout (MM3) – smaller versions of the standard warforged model, similar in size to halflings.
- warforged scorpion (SoX) – warforged resembling giant scorpions created by the drow of Xen'drik since ancient times; similar in construction to warforged titans.
- warforged titan (ECS) – massive constructs created in the early years of Cannith's warforged program; while they have limited problem-solving abilities which set them apart from mindless golems, they are not truly alive like later models.

Besides these base models, individual warforged may have unique features such as upgrading their standard armor plating to mithral or adamantine, building cognizance crystals (capacitors for psionic power) directly into their bodies, or adding extra attack forms such as spikes or fangs.

Warforged are also capable of modifying their bodies to some extent after construction, represented by prestige classes such as the warforged juggernaut (an aloof warrior who becomes more like a golem), the reforged (a socialite who becomes more like a living creature) and the landforged walker (a druid who coaxes the growth of their wooden components).

== History of the warforged ==
=== Warforged in Xen'drik ===
The origins of the warforged on Eberron are not clear. According to a "docent" (ancient and sentient memory-containing magic item) found in Secrets of Xen'drik, the very first warforged were created as "host bodies" for a group of Quori (which were very different from Quori of 998 YK). The giants of Xen'drik created their own versions for their wars against the Quori, because the warforged are immune to many Quori tactics. However, according to Tales of the Last War, the giants invented the warforged, after which the Quori stole the secrets of their creation from the dreams of giants and created their own.

Either way, the secrets of warforged creation seem to have originated on the continent of Xen'drik. The ability of ancient Xen'drik docents to meld with modern-day warforged supports this theory. The existence of Xulo, a huge and powerful warforged found in Xen'drik, also supports this theory.

=== Warforged in Khorvaire ===
Prior to the Last War, the last king of Galifar commissioned the Dragonmarked House Cannith to construct human-sized "mechanical soldiers" similar in appearance to modern warforged. While these soldiers would prove largely ineffective due to their lack of intelligence and high cost, House Cannith continued researching the concept hoping for a more viable product.

Near the halfway point of the Last War, Merrix d'Cannith was commissioned to build a great army of golems to serve as untiring warriors. Not satisfied with the lifeless, unintelligent hulks his forges produced, nor with the prohibitively expensive process of creating golems one-by-one, Merrix began experimenting with magic to instill some spark of life in them that would enable them, like living things, to direct their own actions and to be grown by a self-sustaining process. In 965 YK, after many unsuccessful attempts, Merrix's son Aarren d'Cannith finally invented the process used in modern creation forges.

The warforged that Aarren's creation forges created were fully sentient, with the ability to have emotions, relationships, even to experience death; each new generation increased in sophistication and intelligence, ranging from the barely-sentient titans to the youngest versions of warforged who were fully capable of achieving advanced education and ability in magic. However, Aarren and Merrix had a disagreement over their use. Aarren felt that House Cannith had created life, and refused to see his creations used as tools. Merrix ignored him, and Aarren, feeling powerless, left. Powerful divination magics used to this day have only been able to confirm that he is still alive, not where he is.

In 994 YK (four years before the present day), an unexplained disaster destroyed the entire nation of Cyre, leaving behind the nightmarish mist-shrouded realm of the Mournland. Among the many impacts of this event (including the declaration of a global ceasefire), this resulted in House Cannith losing contact with multiple creation forges and their organisation's at-the-time main headquarters.

In 996 YK, the Last War was officially brought to a close by the Treaty of Thronehold, which included two important rulings regarding the warforged:

1. All warforged were declared 'people', and not possessions.
2. The House Cannith creation forges were to be shut down, never to produce any more of the living constructs.

Despite the rulings, many warforged are still regarded as outsiders, and many are still employed as indentured servants.

There are also rumours that Merrix d'Cannith, (the grandson of the original Merrix) still produces illegal warforged in a lost creation forge. Even more disturbing are the rumors that the Lord of Blades, a rogue warforged, has stumbled onto an undestroyed creation forge in the Mournland and has begun creating an army.

Recently a new group of warforged calling themselves the "Psiforged" have begun appearing across Eberron. Able to use very powerful psionic abilities, their origins are as much as mystery as their motives. Some are said to originate from Mournland, while others appear from deep beneath the depth of Sharn. House Cannith denies any connection to the new design and has stated that they never pursued a psionically enhanced warforged model.

== Religion and spirituality ==
Though warforged have free will, whether they have a soul is not known with certainty; they can be resurrected by spells designed to restore human souls to life, but, unlike humans, never remember anything of the afterlife realm of Dolurrh after such an event. Likewise, warforged are incapable of becoming undead.

While some warforged follow existing religions, this and other differences between themselves and the flesh races have led them to rapidly develop a number of unique faiths and philosophies.

The most prominent figure in warforged spirituality is a near-messianic figure called the Lord of Blades, who took advantage of the Day of Mourning to establish an independent warforged outpost within the Mournland. Operating from a philosophy that the existence of organic life will always pose a threat that his people will be returned to servitude, he wages a guerrilla war with the eventual goal the elimination of human dominance in Khorvaire; his agents thus serve as reliable antagonists for many Eberron campaigns. One of the biggest mysteries in the setting is the nature of the Lord of Blades' identity and to what extent he actually exists or has been mythologized.

Another figure of veneration to the warforged is Bulwark, the liberator of their people. Once a favored servant of King Boranel of Breland, Bulwark is widely held as the driving force behind the inclusion of warforged personhood in the Treaty of Thronehold. Bulwark disappeared into the east after achieving his freedom; some warforged believe that he will return to unite their race, others have set out on their own journeys to find him, and a small group even claim that he and the Lord of Blades are the same person.

The Godforged are groups of wandering monks who believe that the souls of modern warforged are fragments of a being called "The Becoming God", and seek to construct a giant warforged body for it to inhabit. Many Godforged believe that the Lord of Blades has some special connection to the Becoming God, but should not be directly worshipped. The Godforged have also attracted a small number of non-warforged cultists, who follow the religion's philosophy of "making the body into a shrine" by replacing parts of their flesh with golem or warforged components.

== Creative origins ==
The warforged are very similar, in appearance, concept and history, to the War Golems of the comic Battle Chasers. The War Golems were also built to fight in a war and were also social outcasts after the conflict. Similarly, warforged bear many coincidental nuances in common with Nimblewrights, first mentioned in the Monster Manual II (MM2). Nimblewrights however, seem to not only possess self-awareness but also a larger majority of their initial construct designs, including many of immunities.

== Warforged in Fourth Edition ==
As of the release of the 4th Edition Dungeons and Dragons Monster Manual in June 2008, Warforged became an official part of the core Points of Light Campaign Setting, and by extension an encouraged part of all campaign settings (such as Greyhawk, the previous core campaign setting, and The Forgotten Realms).

== Reception ==
Mark Silcox and Jonathan Cox highlighted the roleplaying potential of warforged player characters in the book Dungeons and Dragons and Philosophy: Raiding the Temple of Wisdom. They wrote, "this new playable race turns many of the accepted tropes of traditional high fantasy storytelling on their heads, and presents the player with several possibilities for investigating interesting philosophical experiments. [...] Now these large bipedal meta-humans made of metal, leather, and fibrous joints have their own thoughts and (somewhat naive) emotions, but have no defined purpose within a world without an obvious war to fight".

Geek & Sundry wrote "Winner of Wizards of the Coast's Fantasy Setting Search contest in 2002, Eberron marries magic with steampunk's technology, offering a world of elemental-powered airships, industrial nobility, and arcane tinkerers. [...] I dig the playable Warforged race, which puts you in the mind of a soldier drone seeking purpose (although their explicit maleness serves a pedantic point). If you want to sling spells in a tailored coat, check out Eberron".
