= Eberron Campaign Setting =

Dungeons & Dragons campaign setting sourcebook

- Eberron Campaign Setting book cover
- Author: Keith Baker, Bill Slavicsek, and James Wyatt
- Genre: Role-playing games
- Publisher: Wizards of the Coast
- Publication date: June 2004
- Media type: Hardcover

Eberron Campaign Setting is a hardcover accessory for the 3.5 edition of the Dungeons & Dragons fantasy role-playing game.

== Contents ==
The Eberron Campaign Setting book introduces Eberron, and provides the core campaign setting, including campaign-specific rules and details on the fictional continent of Khorvaire. This book is required to use other Dungeons & Dragons 3.5 Eberron products, and includes the introductory adventure "The Forgotten Forge".

== Publication history ==
Eberron was created by author and game designer Keith Baker as the winning entry for Wizards of the Coast's Fantasy Setting Search, a competition run in 2002 to establish a new setting for the D&D game. Eberron was chosen from more than 11,000 entries, and was officially released with the publication of the Eberron Campaign Setting hardback book in June 2004. Baker said that he submitted Eberron "just because it was a fun idea. I really didn't expect anything to come of it, but I enjoyed writing the proposal."

It was designed by Keith Baker, Bill Slavicsek, and James Wyatt. The cover illustration is by Wayne Reynolds, with interior illustrations by Dave Allsop, Kalman Andrasofszky, John Avon, Ted Beargeon, Beet, David Bircham, Tomm Coker, Rafa Garres, Frazer Irving, Andrew Jones, Dana Knutson, Ron Lemen, Lee Moyer, Lucio Parrillo, Martina Pilcerova, Steve Prescott, Anne Stokes, Mark Tedin, Franz Vohwinkel, Kev Walker, Sam Wood, and James Zhang.

== Reception ==
The reviewer from Pyramid commented: "If you're one of the thousands who submitted a one-page treatment for Wizards of the Coast's world-setting competition, you may want to go ahead and skip this review. But if you're still here: Eberron, the winning entry in the $100,000 contest to select a new world for Dungeons & Dragons fans to play in, is the winner in more ways than one."

Chris Przybyszewski, for the SF Site, wrote "Eberron's true strength comes from its social structures and tone. As for the former, players can be a member of any number of royal or ordinary houses, as well as a number of temples. The chances for inter-house intrigue is tantalizing, as is the prospect of journeying characters from know-nothing newbies to powerful heads of the royal court. The additional pressure of international conflict adds to the game-play possibilities. [...] Eberron comes complete with a starter adventure to launch new parties, and a game master should have little problem immersing her or his party into a new world. The art of the book is excellent, as with most of the modern AD&D (version 3.5 and later) books, and the adults of the group can only enjoy the more mature storylines".

The Eberron Campaign Setting won the Origins Award for Best Role Playing Game Supplement of 2004.

== Reviews ==
- Dragon Slayer
- Dragão Brasil
- Backstab #49
