= Martina Pilcerova =

Slovak artist and writer

- Born: 14 March 1973; Lučenec, Czechoslovakia (now Slovakia)
- Other name: 'Martina'
- Education: Pedagogical University of Nitra; Academy of Fine Arts, Bratislava (MFA)
- Occupations: Artist and author
- Known for: Fantasy art
- Awards: Jack Gaughan Award; Science Fiction, Fantasy and Horror Academy Award; Istron Award
- Website: martina.sk

Martina Pilcerova (born 14 March 1973), known professionally as Martina, is a Slovak fantasy artist and author.

== Life and activities ==
Martina Pilcerova was born on 14 March 1973 in Lučenec, Czechoslovakia (now Slovakia). She studied English and German at the Pedagogical University of Nitra in 1992–93 and studied animation and scriptwriting at the Film University in Bratislava, Slovakia, from 1996 to 1998. Three years later, she earned her MFA from the Academy of Fine Arts, Bratislava. While attending school Martina published short stories in the Czech Republic and Slovakia. She was twice nominated for best fantasy story in competitions in 1996 and 2000. She has been working on an unpublished novel, Niki, for over 20 years and has worked on paintings based on the story.

Martina's first paid art was for a comic series she did for the Lucenec Newsletter in 1991 and she began selling art to role-playing game and collectible card game companies in the United States and Europe in 1997 when she sold covers for the game Waste World. Martina began publishing art with the Dungeons & Dragons and Magic: The Gathering lines from Wizards of the Coast in the first decade of the 21st century. She has also illustrated cards from World of Warcraft among other publishers.

=== Awards ===
Martina received the Jack Gaughan Award for Best Emerging Artist in 2003, the Science Fiction, Fantasy and Horror Academy Award for the best artist in the Czech Republic and Slovakia in 1999, 2001, and 2002, and the Istron Award for the best artist in Slovakia in 2001, 2003, and 2004.
