= Anthony S. Waters =

American artist

- Known for: Fantasy art

Anthony S. Waters is an artist whose work has appeared in role-playing games.

== Career ==
Anthony S. Waters is best known for his work on Magic: The Gathering. He worked at Wizards of the Coast from 1997 to 1999 as a conceptual designer, graphic designer, writer, and card illustrator. His Dungeons & Dragons work includes Sharn: City of Towers and the 3rd edition version of Monster Manual II.
