= Eric Deschamps =

American freelance and concept artist

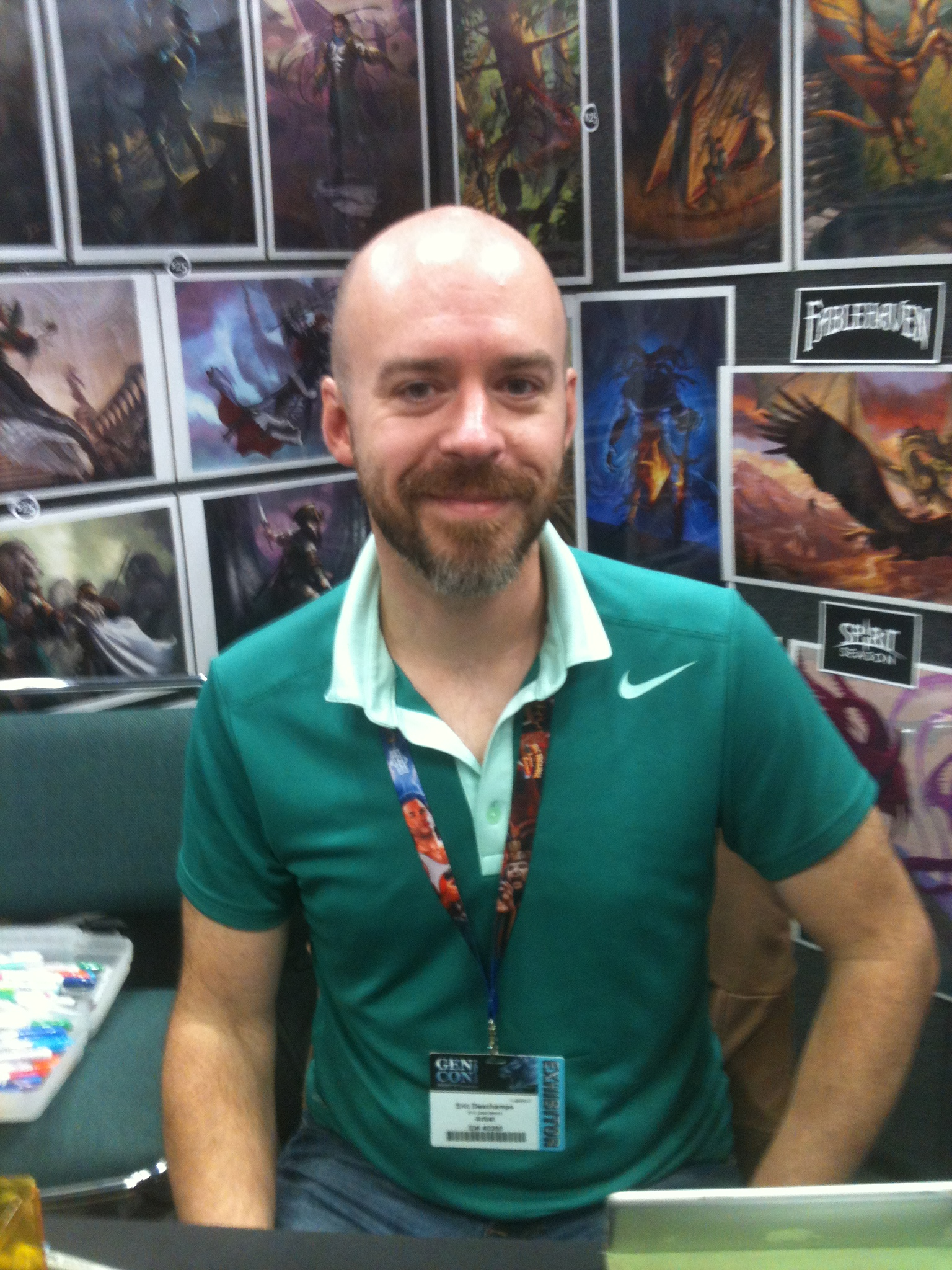
- Known for: Fantasy art

Eric Deschamps (born 1975) is a freelance and concept artist whose work has appeared in role-playing games, science fiction and fantasy books.

== Career ==
Over the years, Deschamps has worked on various projects, including illustrations for popular publications such as Dungeons & Dragons, Magic: The Assembly, Vampire the Eternal Struggle by White Wolf, Decipher's Wars card game, Giant magazine, and Fantasy Flight's A Game of Thrones card game. His work has been recognised in publications including nine volumes of Spectrum, where he was awarded for best Contemporary Fantastic Drawing, Expose 2, where he received accolades for best digital drawings, and the silver award by the Society of Illustrators of Los Angeles.

Deschamps' professional career began as a television graphic designer for NBC in New York, where he was responsible for creating animated graphics for popular shows such as NBC Nightly News, Today, NBC Sports, and Saturday Night Live. He was part of the Emmy award-winning design team for the Sydney and Salt Lake City Olympic Games.

== Work ==
Dungeons & Dragons interior art for Sharn: City of Towers (2004), Explorer's Handbook (2005), Dragon Magic (2006), Complete Mage (2006), Fiendish Codex II: Tyrants of the Nine Hells (2006), Complete Scoundrel (2007), Magic Item Compendium (2007), Expedition to the Demonweb Pits (2007), Complete Champion (2007), Rules Compendium (2007), and the fourth edition Player's Handbook (2008), Manual of the Planes (2008), and Player's Handbook 2 (2009).

He is also known for his work on the Magic: The Gathering collectible card game.

=== Cover Illustration ===
d20 System: Critical Hit Deck, first edition (May 2007)

d20 System: Critical Fumble Deck, first edition (January 2008)

Pathfinder - Golarion: W3 - Flight of the Red Raven, first edition (May 2008)

World of Darkness [2004]: Inferno, first edition (July 2010)

d20 System: Critical Fumble Deck, second edition (February 2010)

d20 System: Critical Hit Deck, second edition (February 2010)

World of Darkness [2004]: Fallen is Babylon, first edition (June 2010)

D&D5 - Dungeons and Dragons Fifth Edition: DM Screen Eberron, first edition (January 2020)

Ellis and Pathseeker (Dragon Storm 3) (2022)

=== Other Illustrations ===
An Adventurer's Guide to Eberron

Shadowrun: Increase

Shadowrun: Increases

Pathfinder: Beginner Box

Pathfinder: Bestiary 2

Pathfinder: Bestiary 2 Box

Pathfinder: Monster Box 2

D&D4 - Dungeons and Dragons Fourth Edition: The Book of Vile Darkness

D&D4 - Dungeons and Dragons The Forgotten Kingdoms: Campaign Guide

D&D4 - Eberron: Campaign Guide

Pathfinder - Golarion: Campaign Setting

D&D3 - Dungeons and Dragons Third Edition: Complete Champion

D&D3 - Dungeons and Dragons Third Edition: Complete Mage

D&D4 - Dungeons and Dragons Fourth Edition: Core Rulebook Collection

GURPS - Transhuman Space: Toxic Memes

The World of Darkness: Innocents
