= James Zhang =

Artist

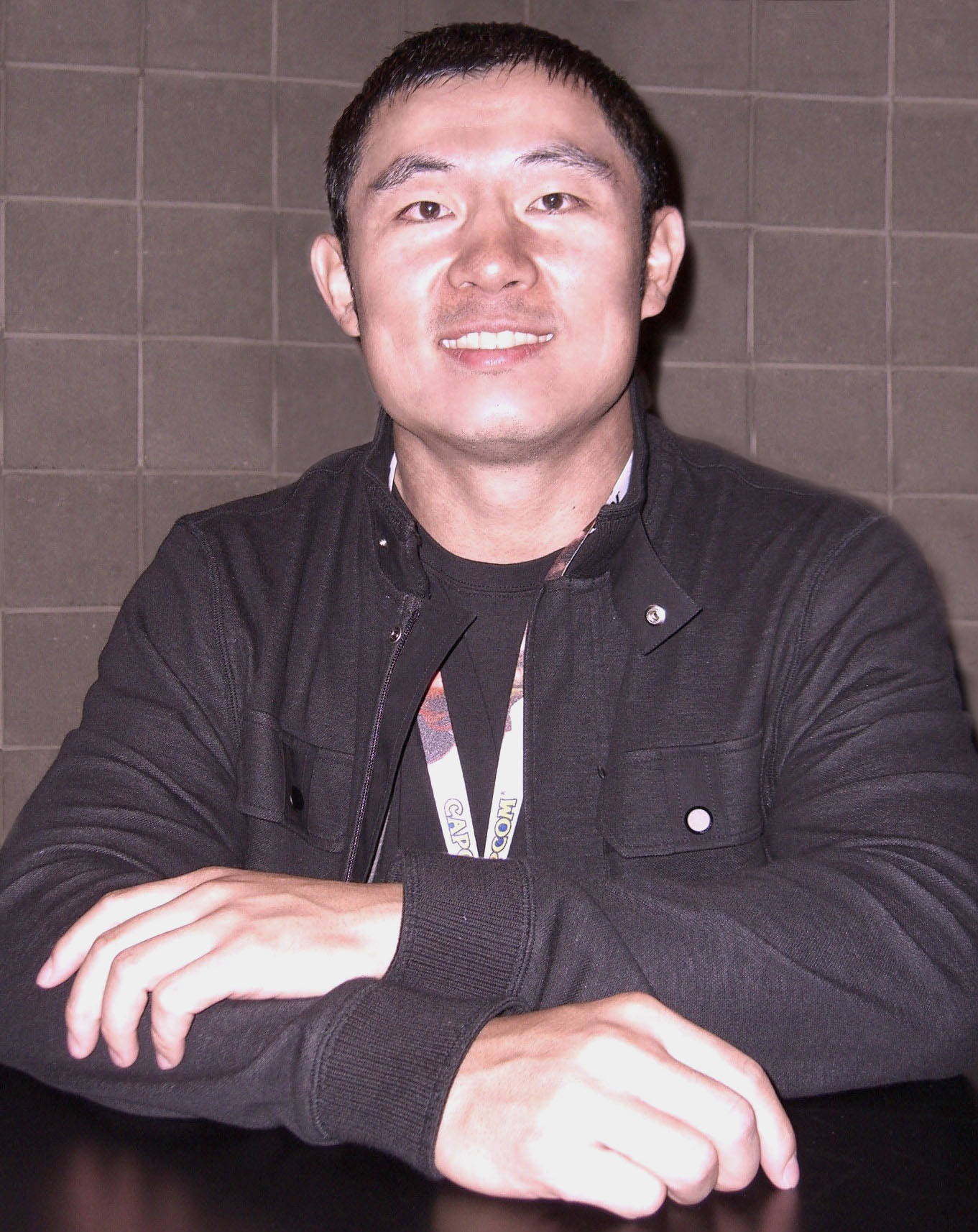
- Zhang at the New York Comic Con in Manhattan, October 9, 2010.

James Zhang is an artist whose work has appeared in role-playing games.

== Career ==
Zhang has contributed interior illustrations to numerous Dungeons & Dragons supplements for Wizards of the Coast, such as Sharn: City of Towers (2004), Eberron Campaign Setting (2004), Monster Manual III (2004), Races of the Wild (2005), Races of Eberron (2005), Five Nations (2005), Tome of Magic (2006), Fiendish Codex II: Tyrants of the Nine Hells (2006), and Drow of the Underdark (2007), as well as cover art on Crucible of Chaos (2008) for the GameMaster line from Paizo Publishing.

Zhang has also done artwork for the video game industry, including several games based on the Star Wars franchise.

Zhang is the founder and CEO of digital arts developer Concept Art House, backed by superangel Matthew Le Merle, and headquartered in San Francisco and Shanghai. Here, Zhang was the executive producer on the graphic novel series Daomu, an English language adaptation of the Chinese book series Daomu Biji, for Image Comics.
