= Mark Tedin =

American game artist

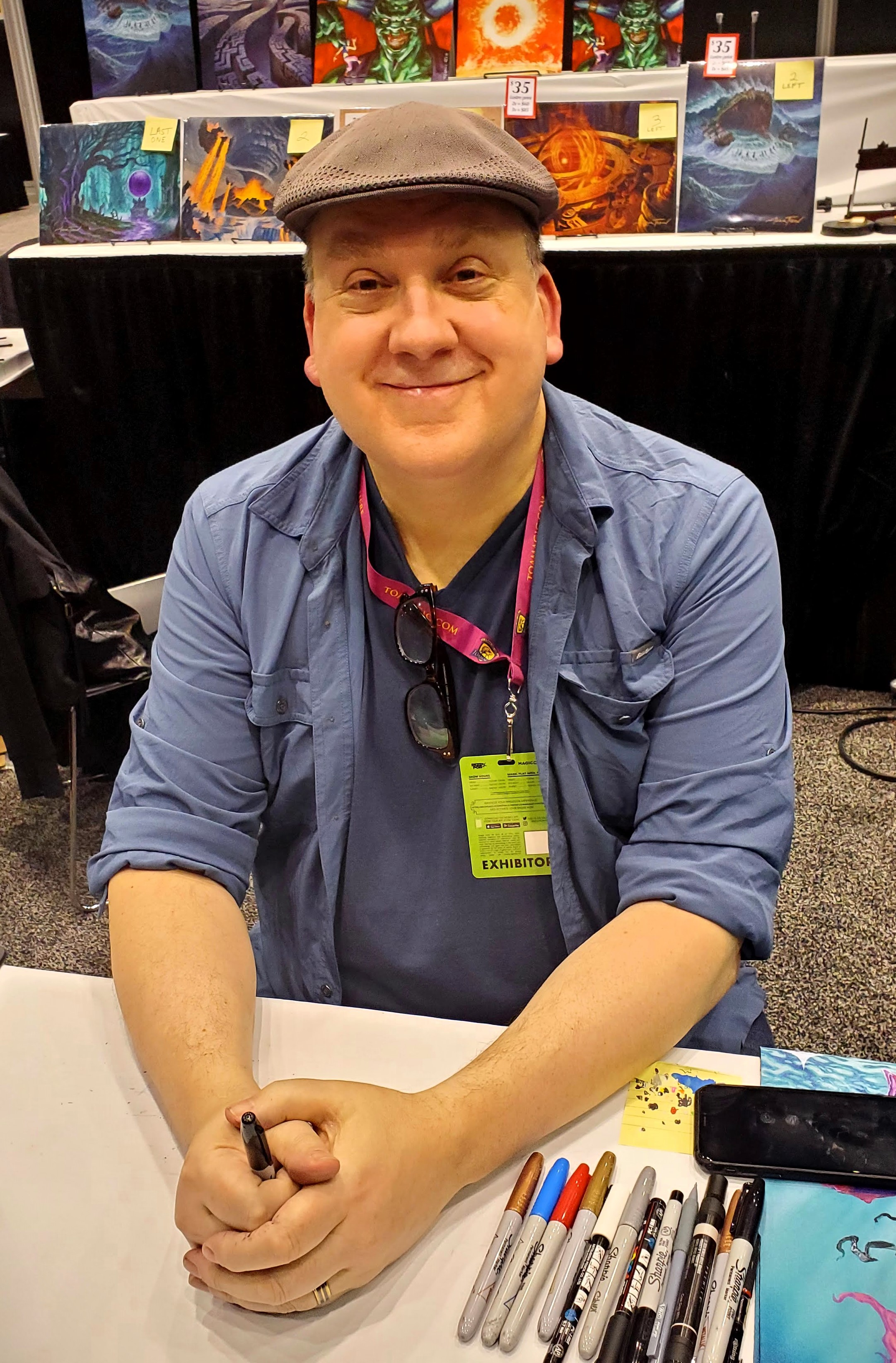
- Tedin at MagicCon Chicago in 2024
- Known for: Fantasy art

Mark Tedin is an artist whose work has appeared in collectible card games and role-playing games.

== Early life and education ==
Mark Tedin was born in Sitka, Alaska. After high school, he attended college at Gonzaga University in Spokane, Washington, and then received his master's degree in fine arts at Washington University in St. Louis. He graduated in 1992.

== Career ==
Tedin did freelance work for Wizards of the Coast and worked as a staff artist at Wizards of the Coast from 1997 to 2000. He is best known for his work on Magic: The Gathering and Dungeons & Dragons.

Tedin is one of the original twenty-five Magic: The Gathering artists. Outside of Magic he has worked on Vampire, Legend of the Five Rings, Legend of the Burning Sands, Battletech, Netrunner, and Doomtown.

Since his time at Wizards, Tedin has also worked part-time at the Northwest College of Art & Design near Seattle, where he has taught illustration, visual composition, and figure drawing.
