= Lucio Parrillo =

Italian artist

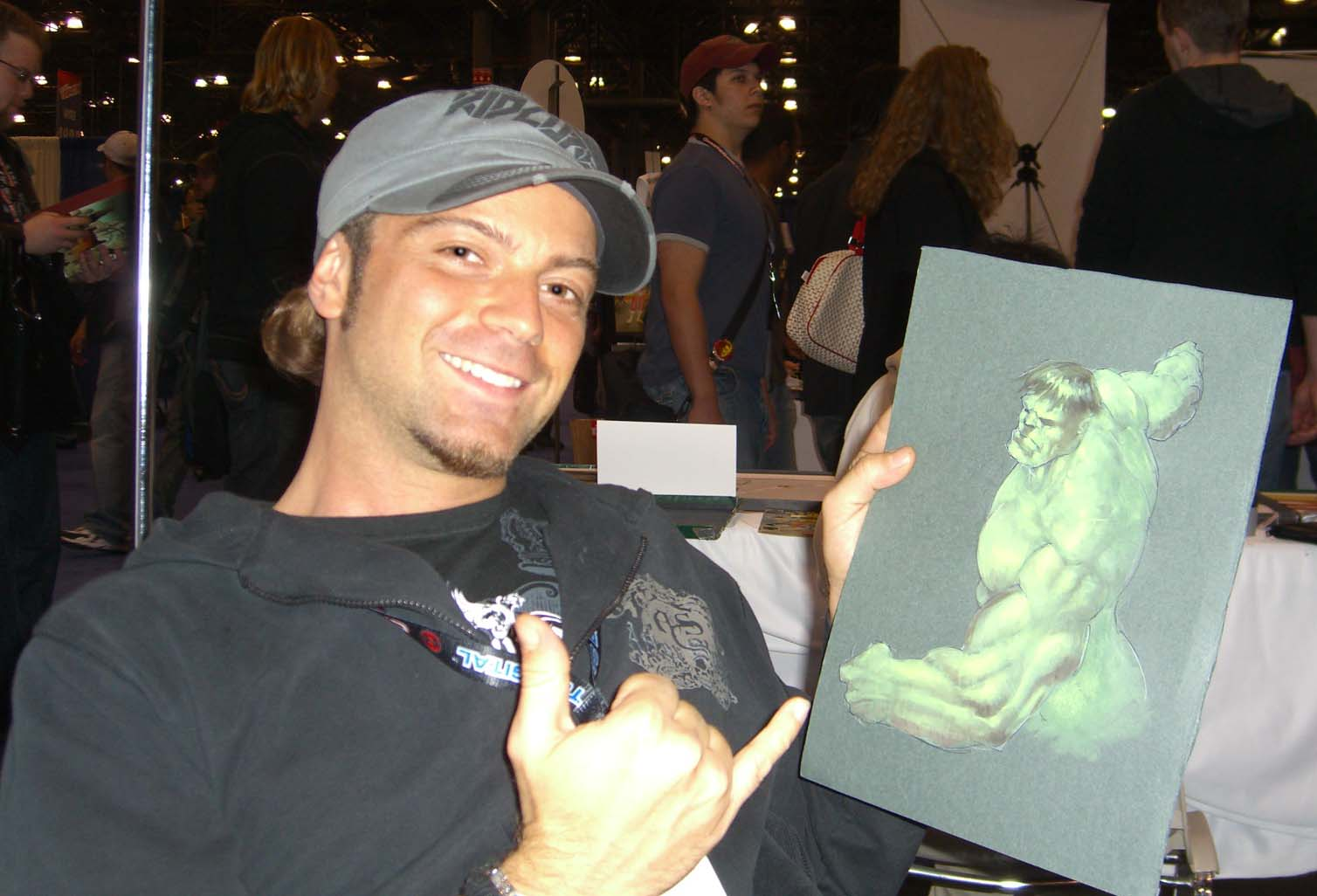
- Parrillo at 2008 New York Comic Con
- Born: 30 January 1974 (age 52); Catanzaro, Italy
- Known for: Fantasy art

Lucio Parrillo (born 30 January 1974) is an Italian artist, known for comic books, role-playing game covers, and Magic: The Gathering cards.

== Early life ==
Lucio was born in Catanzaro, southern Italy, and he attended art school there in Catanzaro.

== Career ==
Parrillo penciled the comics Vampire Girls, Coven 2 and Eternal Temptation, and also did the artwork on the series L'Empire Eternel. He has created covers for Skorpio, Lennox, Vampirella, and Lord of the Jungle.

His Dungeons & Dragons work includes cover art for Champions of Ruin (2005), and interior art for Sharn: City of Towers (2004), Monster Manual III (2004), Eberron Campaign Setting (2004), Champions of Valor (2005), Spell Compendium (2005), Red Hand of Doom (2006), Tome of Magic (2006), Player's Handbook II (2006), Dragon Magic (2006), Expedition to Castle Ravenloft (2006), Rules Compendium (2007), and the fourth edition Manual of the Planes (2008), Thunderspire Labyrinth (2008), Pyramid of Shadows (2008), and Martial Power (2008).

Parrillo's other print work has included the magazines Città, Color, and Lanciostory; the newspaper Il Cavatore; and stories and posters for publishing house Zero Press. He has also illustrated video games.
