= Anne Stokes =

British artist

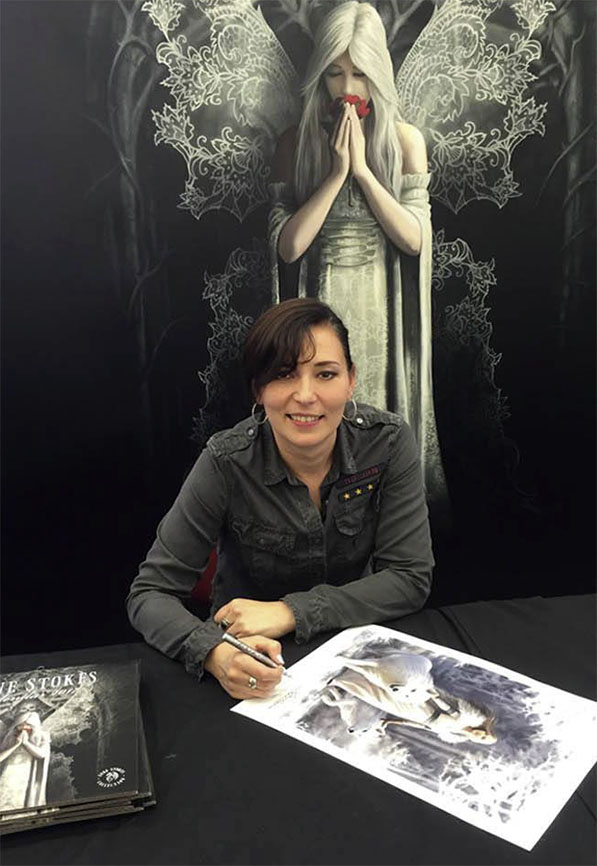
- Stokes at signing event, NEC 2016
- Born: London, England
- Known for: Fantasy art

Anne Stokes is a fantasy artist whose early work has appeared in role-playing games, particularly Dungeons & Dragons.

== Early life ==
Originally from London, Stokes has had an interest in the fantasy genre since her father read The Hobbit to her as a child.

== Career ==
Stokes has been a professional artist since 2000.

Stokes has illustrated for Wizards of the Coast, including Dungeons & Dragons. Her Dungeons & Dragons work includes interior art for the 3.5 edition books Monster Manual III (2004), Player's Handbook II (2006), Monster Manual IV (2006), Fiendish Codex I: Hordes of the Abyss (2006), Complete Mage (2006), Magic Item Compendium (2007), Monster Manual V (2007) and Rules Compendium (2007), and the 4th edition Monster Manual (2008) and Manual of the Planes (2008).

Her art career progressed and now she works solely in licensing her own creations across the globe with the help of her agency, Art Ask Agency.

Stokes did the cover artwork for the One Minute Silence album Available in All Colours.

Morten Veland from the Norwegian gothic metal band Sirenia was surfing the internet when he found Stokes's mermaid picture titled "Siren's Lament". He became interested and contacted her for the permits to use it as an album cover for Perils of the Deep Blue.

Stokes lives in Yorkshire, England with her son Leo and husband John Woodward.
