= Eberron =

Tabletop role-playing game setting

- Designers: Keith Baker, Bill Slavicsek, and James Wyatt
- Publishers: Wizards of the Coast
- Publication: 2004
- Genres: Fantasy
- Languages: English
- Systems: D&D v3.5 4th edition 5th edition
- Chance: Dice rolling

Eberron is a campaign setting for the Dungeons & Dragons (D&D) role-playing game. The game is set primarily on the continent of Khorvaire following a vast destructive war. Eberron is designed to accommodate traditional D&D elements and races within a differently toned setting; Eberron combines a fantasy tone with pulp and dark adventure elements, and some non-traditional fantasy technologies such as trains, skyships, and mechanical beings which are all powered by magic.

Eberron was created by author and game designer Keith Baker as the winning entry for Wizards of the Coast's Fantasy Setting Search, a competition run in 2002 to establish a new setting for the D&D game. Eberron was chosen from more than 11,000 entries, and was officially released with the publication of the Eberron Campaign Setting hardback book in June 2004.

== Creative origins ==
Keith Baker's Dungeons & Dragons campaign setting of Eberron was chosen as the winner among the 11,000 submissions to the Wizards of the Coast Fantasy Setting Search in 2002. Baker won $100,000 for his contest submission. The original title of Baker's setting was the Thrilling Tales of Swords and Sorcery. Baker highlighted that the setting went through multiple stages of development:

Thrilling Tales wasn't Eberron. It went through four stages of development. First there was the original one page concept, which went up against thousands of others. The next step was expanding that into ten pages, fleshing out the core idea. From there I wrote a hundred page story bible. But even then, it was still Thrilling Tales of Swords and Sorcery. Once Thrilling Tales was chosen as the final setting, I went to Seattle and spent weeks working with an amazing team of people at Wizards of the Coast: Bill Slavicsek, Chris Perkins, James Wyatt, and many others. Together we isolated the best parts of Thrilling Tales, as well as identifying the elements that didn't work and finding ways to improve them. [...] [It] was Bill Slavicsek who named the world Eberron.

On the Fantasy Setting Search contest, Slavicsek highlighted that four subteams reduced the 11,000 submissions to 120 entries which were then reviewed by a panel who whittled it down to eleven proposals. These eleven contest submitters were then asked to expand their one-page submissions and from these new ten-page submissions, the panel further reduced the proposals to just three entries. Slavicsek said:

[A]t this point, we learned the names of the authors and we flew each of them to Wizards of the Coast's offices to meet with them. During those meetings, I began to direct each project in earnest, just as I would direct any product published through the efforts of my R&D team. It was great meeting Keith Baker, Rich Burlew, and Nathan Toomey in person, getting to talk about their worlds with them, and getting to help them each make their vision come alive. We gave them an outline form to follow so they could create 125-page world bibles [...]. All three [proposals] were great, but we had to select the one we were going to put our efforts behind. That one was Keith Baker's world, the world that became Eberron.

The inspiration for Eberron came when Baker was working on VR-1's cancelled pulp MMORPG Lost Continents. Baker aimed to fuse the energy of pulp adventure and film noir settings to traditional fantasy settings and steampunk. The Eberron Campaign Setting sourcebook lists the following films as inspirations for Eberron's tone and attitude: Brotherhood of the Wolf, Casablanca, From Hell, The Maltese Falcon, The Mummy, The Name of the Rose, Pirates of the Caribbean, Raiders of the Lost Ark and Sleepy Hollow. Baker also said inspiration for the war-torn setting came from the unstable period of world history between World War I and II.

== Publication history ==
The 2004 Eberron Campaign Setting book for Dungeons & Dragons v3.5 was written by Keith Baker, Bill Slavicsek, and James Wyatt. In June 2005, the Eberron Campaign Setting book won the Origins Award for Best Roleplaying Game Supplement of 2004. Over the next four years, over 20 supplements for Eberron were released. Shannon Appelcline, author of Designers & Dragons, wrote "meanwhile, it had also become the setting for Dungeons & Dragons Online (2006), Atari's major multimedia expansion of the D&D brand. By 2009, Eberron was still big, and that's why it won out as 4e's second setting".

In June 2009, the Eberron Player's Guide and the free adventure Khyber's Harvest (2009) brought the setting to the new 4th Edition of D&D. It was followed in July by the Eberron Campaign Guide (2009) and the not-free adventure Seekers of the Ashen Crown (2009). The development of the 4th Edition of D&D brought many design changes including the addition of a new default setting that followed the new "Points of Light" design philosophy – a world that looked less like the modern world, "full of civilized countries with civilized borders", and more like a world with few centers of civilization separated by the open, dangerous wilderness. On the impact of the edition change, Appelcline wrote:

Players were wondering if Eberron would also be changed to more closely match the Points of Light ideals and surprisingly … it wasn't. Instead, Eberron appears much as it did before. There wasn't even a timeline change; though rumors at one points suggested a two-year advancement was in the works, the world ended up remaining in 998YK. Eberron's designers and developers said that players interested in metaplot should read the novels and decide themselves whether they wanted to include those events in their games. Though Eberron didn't become a Points of Light world, it did adopt many of the other assumptions of 4e.

In February 2015, the very first instance of the online feature "Unearthed Arcana" provided Eberron content for public playtesting for the 5th Edition. However, further official Eberron content did not appear until 3 years later, when the Wayfinder's Guide to Eberron was released on July 23, 2018, as a PDF on Dungeon Masters Guild; it was described as a "living document" that would be updated as the included concepts were refined. Over the next year, various features such as races, dragonmarks, magic items, as well as the artificer class and subclasses, went through the "Unearthed Arcana" public playtest process. An "exploratory campaign featuring Eberron" was released for the D&D Adventurers League as PDFs between September and December 2018.

Eberron: Rising From The Last War, a hardcover setting book, was published on November 19, 2019. An alternative art cover by Vance Kelly for the book was also released in local game stores on November 17. At the same time, the Wayfinder's Guide to Eberron was updated to include the final versions of the included content as it appears in Eberron: Rising from the Last War, and added the artificer class from the same book (with only one subclass – the Alchemist – of the three included in Rising from the Last War). To correspond with this release, the D&D Adventurers League added a new season of stories called The Oracle of War that take place in the Mournland. Shawn Merwin, Adventurers League Resource Manager, wrote that the Oracle of War storyline is a "very different type of campaign from what has come before [in Adventurers League]. The story presented in Oracle of War plays out in 20 Core Storyline adventures that take characters from level 1 to 20. [...] Core Storyline adventures are placed on the DMs Guild at the rate of one per month, giving the campaign an active play period of approximately 2 years".

The setting sourcebook Eberron: Forge of the Artificer (2025) was scheduled to be published in August 2025; however, the release was delayed to December 9, 2025 due to a cover warping issue which required a total reprint of the print run. As part of the 2024 revision to the 5th Edition ruleset, the sourcebook expands on the world of Eberron along with revising the ruleset. This includes a revised artificer character class, revised Dragonmarks, revised species of the setting, the introduction of the khoravar (Eberron's half-elves) as a new species choice, and three campaign outlines. Wizards of the Coast previewed players' options from this sourcebook at PAX East in May 2025; premade characters, using the updated rules, were provided for use during game sessions for the new Eberron adventure Race for the Crab Temple.

== Characteristics ==
Eberron Campaign Setting book cover

One of the most obvious differences between Eberron and generic Dungeons & Dragons is the level of magic. High-level magic, including resurrection spells, is less common than in most other settings. However, low-level magic is much more pervasive, primarily provided by the Dragonmarked houses. Many cities have magical lanterns throughout the streets. A continent-spanning magical "lightning rail" provides high speed transportation.

Alignment is slightly more muddied than in other official settings. Evil beings of traditionally good races and good beings of traditionally evil races are encouraged, but alignment definition remains true to D&D standards, with good and evil retaining their meanings. However, the situation often arises in the campaign world that oppositely aligned characters will side with each other briefly if a threat looms over all, and also both good and evil characters will infiltrate each other's organizations for purposes of espionage.

Religion is similarly less clear-cut. The pantheon of Eberron does not make itself overtly known. The existence of divine magic is not evidence of the gods, as clerics who worship no deities but instead follow a path or belief system also receive spells. A cleric can even actively work against their own church and continue to receive spells. As a result, religion is largely a matter of faith. Unlike in many other 3rd edition D&D settings, a cleric does not have to be within one step of his deity's or religion's alignment, and is not restricted from casting certain spells because of alignment.

The setting adds a new base character class, the artificer. Artificers are spellcasters focusing on magical item creation. Artificer infusions (their equivalent to spells) focus on temporarily imbuing objects with the desired effects. For example, instead of casting bull's strength on a character, an artificer would cast it upon a belt to create a short term magical Belt of Bull's Strength. Artificers have access to a pool of "craft points" which act as extra experience points (only) for use in creating magical items without sacrificing level attainment. This pool is refilled when the artificer gains levels, or by draining power from an existing magical item (destroying the item in the process).

Eberron also introduced a new non-player character class known as the magewright, which is an arcane caster who has a limited selection of low-level spells. The existence of magewrights is part of the reason for the prevalence of low-level magic in Eberron.

To try to create a pulp setting, Eberron initially used "action points" that allow a player to add a six-sided die to the result of rolls made with a twenty-sided die. Characters receive a set allotment of single-use action points each character level. The Eberron Campaign Setting also includes feats which grant additional uses for action points, such as allowing a player to add an eight-sided die instead of a six-sided die, or spending two action points to grant your character an additional move or standard action. Certain class features with uses per day, like a barbarian's rage ability, a cleric's turn/rebuke undead ability, or a druid's wild shape ability, can be used again by spending 2 action points. The final use for action points is to spend one to stabilize a dying character.

== Fictional setting ==
=== World ===
The world of Eberron contains seven continents. The setting primarily takes place in Khorvaire, the most populated continent. Humans are the most populous race in Khorvaire, living primarily in the area known as the Five Nations. Southeast is the small continent of Aerenal, ruled by elves. Due south is the jungle continent of Xen'drik, once ruled by an empire of giants that collapsed. It is now largely wilderness, with some areas under tribal dominion of the drow. Further south of Xen'drik is Everice, a continent-sized sheet of ice possibly covering several land masses. Frostfell is an unexplored land of ice in the north. The other two main continents are Sarlona (a continent ruled by quori, creatures from the Region of Dreams) and Argonnessen (a continent inhabited by dragons). The world of Eberron has twelve moons; some sages believe there is a thirteenth moon that has vanished or is invisible to the naked eye.

The World of Eberron comprises a number of features for the Eberron campaign setting. The number 13, also known as a "baker's dozen", has been part of a theme Keith Baker used regarding aspects of the world.

"Eberron" is also the name for the land of the world, and is referred to as the Dragon Between. Siberys, the Dragon Above, is the name given to the planetary rings which surround the planet. Khyber, the Dragon Below, is the name given to the underworld, and is similar to the Underdark in many other settings. According to the creation story, the world was formed when the progenitor wyrms changed their form into what they are now. Siberys and Khyber fought, leading to Siberys' body being broken into pieces. To stop Khyber, Eberron wrapped around him, and Siberys' broken body became a ring around them both. Siberys created the dragons, Eberron created humanoids and other "lower races", and Khyber created the "demons" of the world. According to Keith Baker, there is some significance to the fact that each name contains the morpheme "ber", but he has not stated what this is.

==== Dragonmarks ====
Dragonmarks and the hereditary Dragonmarked Houses were created for the setting as a way to incorporate magic across society in Eberron. Baker compared the Dragonmarked Houses to the "Spacing Guild from Dune" as these "houses are powers that exist beyond the rule of princes or kings". He explained that the original idea of granting all humanoids minor magical gifts "made the world a little too chaotic and unfocused" which led to the development of "twelve extended families, each of which possessed a specific magical gift". By wielding the dragonmarks, these families would have importance and "economic influence" in the setting along with distinct agendas and in-fighting which creates narrative opportunities for both player characters and Dungeon Masters. Appelcline referred to Eberron's dragonmarks as "one of the most notable new game systems in 3e" and emphasized that each mark had a unique effect, with many being "restricted by race".

Appelcline highlighted that the designers of 4th Edition "decided" the original iteration of dragonmarks "hadn't served their intended purpose" as players did not utilize them "enough" since the "powers were often more interesting for NPCs of the Dragonmark Houses" and many players did not reach the higher levels where dragonmarks became "really powerful". The 4th Edition iteration were "redesigned to improve existing powers" and simplified by removing the hierarchy of dragonmarks and the race restrictions for player characters. Dragonmarks and the associated houses returned in the 5th Edition in 2019 after going through the public playtest process; this iteration of dragonmarks were incorporated mechanically as variant subraces of specific races. In February 2025, an Unearthed Arcana playtest included revised dragonmark mechanics which shifted them to feats with a progression option.

=== Creatures ===
Eberron utilized traditional Dungeons & Dragons races but gave them entirely localized lore, history and national ties. Eberron emphasizes national and cultural ties over racial ties. Sean K. Reynolds wrote that "for example, the elves of House Phiarlan are an old dragonmarked house with a centuries-long history of entertainment and artistry; most common folk praise them and their work. In contrast to that house, the elves of the new nation of Valenar are seen as land thieves and a threat to the peace established by the Treaty of Thronehold". Gabrielle Lissauer, in The Tropes of Fantasy Fiction, highlighted that the Eberron campaign setting subverts the classical racial presentation of orcs as savages. Instead, Lissauer wrote that "these orcs are interested in peace and keeping the world safe. [...] They just want to live in harmony with nature".

The setting also added four new races to Dungeons & Dragons: Changelings, Shifters, Kalashtar, and Warforged. Changelings and Shifters were based on preexisting Dungeons & Dragons monsters, doppelgangers and lycanthropes respectively. Warforged, sentient constructs created by artificers during the Last War, and Kalashtar, psionic humanoids combined with quori spirits, were created for Eberron.

==== Kalashtar ====
The kalashtar are a race of psionic people; they are the descendants of a group of human monks from Adar, a nation on the continent of Sarlona, who allowed themselves to be possessed by the planar entities known as the Quori. These entities were good-aligned Quori who rebelled and thus had to flee the plane of dreams known as Dal Quor. This merger was permanent leading their descendants to become a hybrid-type race. The spiritual essence of each Quori is divided out amongst many Kalashtar, known collectively as a lineage. Thus, the only way to completely destroy one of the good-aligned Quori is to exterminate its entire lineage. The evil-aligned Quori, known as the Dreaming Dark, seek to hunt and destroy the Kalashtar so many Kalashtar live in either the fortified temple-keeps of Adar or live in hiding amongst the wider world of Eberron. The Dreaming Dark have their own possessed creatures known as the Inspired who rule most of the continent of Sarlona.

Baker highlighted the design differences between the Dreaming Dark and the kalashtar: "Quori possession is entirely different from the relationship between a kalashtar and their quori spirit. With the kalashtar, the quori is a passive presence that simultaneously guides many kalashtar. With the Inspired (voluntary or otherwise) the quori is an active presence that controls a single body at a time, and it fully dominates the host". Glenn Carreau, for GameRant, highlighted the roleplaying potential of kalashtar player characters: "While separate from most of Khorvaire's drama, Sarlona has plenty of its own: kalashtar are a hunted race, shuttered into their monastic country of Adar and constantly besieged by their Inspired enemies in the neighboring nation of Riedra. Still, those who want to play kalashtar in a campaign based elsewhere in Eberron can do so without disrupting the setting's narrative; small numbers of kalashtar do inhabit cities across Khorvaire, quietly continuing their battle against the Inspired even far from home".

==== Warforged ====
The warforged are a race of living, sentient constructs, superficially similar to golems. Warforged are composed of a blend of materials: predominantly stone, wood, and some type of metal. In Eberron, they were created by House Cannith in magical 'creation forges' to fight in the Last War. When the Last War ended, they were given their freedom at the Treaty of Thronehold. Though they have free will, whether they have a soul is not known with certainty; they can be resurrected by spells designed to restore human souls to life, but, unlike humans, never remember anything of their experience in the afterlife after such an event. While they have no biological sex, warforged may adopt a gender role as part of their individual personality. They do not age as the other races do, and it is not known what effects time will have on them. It is generally assumed that, like all living creatures, their bodies must experience degradation over time. Like other races, warforged may take levels in any character class.

== Reception ==
Gabrielle Lissauer, in The Tropes of Fantasy Fiction, emphasized that Eberron helped move Dungeons & Dragons past the tropes established by Tolkien. She wrote that "Eberron changed several ideas that were considered fundamental to the concept of Dungeons and Dragons for the past thirty years, both mechanically and in the flavor of the worlds. [...] With changes to things that most players considered being fundamental to the game, Eberron subverts and yet at the same time shows what the game could be". Lissauer highlighted that alignment was no longer clear cut and that the players were "unable to use their meta-knowledge of years of playing Dungeons and Dragons in other settings to judge who is friend and who is foe". Stefan Ekman, in the book Urban Fantasy: Exploring Modernity through Magic, argued that Eberron has the features of an urban fantasy. Ekman commented that a "basic assumption" of the setting "is that magic has developed in a similar way to technology in our world and is now ubiquitous and commonplace" and thus Eberron "treats the supernatural (magic) in a modern and mundane, rather than an arcane, fashion. The world is also explicitly set up to mix the genres of fantasy, noir, and adventure stories in a post- (or inter-) bellum world reminiscent of the 1920s. When considered as fantasy, certain features stand out more clearly than others; when examined with an urban fantasy lens, other patterns emerge, suggesting different adventures for the players to engage in". He also noted Eberron "makes use of the layering of cities to create underground spaces of the past" and that "these subterranean pasts provide spaces for the supernatural domain, for challenges and adventures, but they are also reflections of the present surface".

In 2015, Geek & Sundry wrote: "Winner of Wizards of the Coast's Fantasy Setting Search contest in 2002, Eberron marries magic with steampunk's technology, offering a world of elemental-powered airships, industrial nobility, and arcane tinkerers. [...] I dig the playable Warforged race, which puts you in the mind of a soldier drone seeking purpose (although their explicit maleness serves a pedantic point). If you want to sling spells in a tailored coat, check out Eberron".

Wired, on the release of the 4th Edition Eberron Campaign Guide, reported that "Eberron is my new favorite game world. [...] The world feels like it was designed from the ground up to be original and different, and still feels consistent and logical. The world's continents have an interlocking and compelling history [...]. Magic is treated as an integral part of society. You can take a magical train (the 'lightning rail') or fly elemental-powered airships. [...] I love the section on 'everyday magic' which describes how magic affects the daily lives of the ordinary citizens, covering agriculture, communications, crafts, law enforcement and so on. [...] Most worlds have politics but I can't think of any whose residents foment such complex, yet totally logical machinations. [...] The best thing bout the setting, however, may be that it simply takes the classic D&D tropes like dragons and elves and mixes them up in a new and interesting way".

On the release of the 5th Edition Wayfinder's Guide to Eberron, Richard Jansen-Parkes, for the UK print magazine Tabletop Gaming, wrote: "Originally created by Gloom designer Keith Baker for a competition some 16 years ago, Eberron is a wonderful example of how to take the standard fantasy setting and twist it into something fresh. While many of the standard fantasy tropes are still accounted for – there are still dragons to battle and dungeons to delve – there is a deliberate effort to shift away from Tolkien rip-offs and instead start ripping off everything from Jurassic Park to Casablanca. If that sounds like a criticism, it really isn't. [...] The entire setting is packed with magical gadgets and gizmos, but at the same time it manages to feel a little more down-to-earth and dirtier than the Forgotten Realms [...]. Where more traditional worlds have played host to battles between good and evil on a vast scale, Eberron is gripped in a cold war where there is very little black-and-white morality to spare".

Polygon, on the release of the 5th Edition Eberron: Rising From The Last War, reported that "Eberron is an amazing place, and Wizards of the Coast does an excellent job in this new book explaining it and giving players the tools to have fun there".
