= Monster Manual 2 =

2009 role-playing game supplement

- Genre: Role-playing game
- Publisher: Wizards of the Coast
- Publication date: 2009
- Media type: Print
- ISBN: 978-0786951017

Monster Manual 2 is a supplement to the 4th edition of the Dungeons & Dragons role-playing game.

== Contents ==
Monster Manual 2 presents hundreds of monsters for D&D campaigns. Monsters such as centaurs and frost giants make their first 4th Edition appearance here. In addition, this book includes new monsters to challenge characters of heroic, paragon, and epic level.

== Publication history ==
Monster Manual 2 was written by Rob Heinsoo and Chris Sims, and published in 2009. The book features art by Dave Allsop, Zoltan Boros, Christopher Burdett, Brian Despain, Brian "Chippy" Dugan, Jesper Ejsing, Steve Ellis, Wayne England, Jason Engle, Adam Gillespie, Tomas Giorello, Lars Grant-West, Des Hanley, Ralph Horsley, Andrew Hou, Jeremy Jarvis, Bob Jordan, Todd Lockwood, Warren Mahy, James Nelson, William O'Connor, Steve Prescott, Vinod Rams, Chris Seaman, Gábor Szikszai, Mattias Tapia, Mark Tedin, Francis Tsai, Brian Valenzuela, Franz Vohwinkel, Eva Widermann, Eric Williams, Sam Wood, and Ben Wootten.

Shannon Appelcline commented that with Fourth Edition Dungeons & Dragons, Wizards intended to publish only three books for each setting, beginning with the poorly-received Forgotten Realms Campaign Guide, Forgotten Realms Player's Guide and Scepter Tower of Spellgard in 2008, and "The next year saw the clockwork production of Dungeon Master's Guide 2 (2009), Monster Manual 2 (2009) and Player's Handbook 2 (2009), as well as the reappearance of Eberron through the typical two books and an adventure – the latter released as part of Free RPG Day. These setting books were much better accepted, perhaps because the 4e nay-sayers had now moved on to other games."
