= Player's Handbook 2 =

2009 role-playing game supplement

- Author: Rob Heinsoo, Mike Mearls, Robert J. Schwalb
- Genre: Role-playing game
- Publisher: Wizards of the Coast
- Publication date: March 2009
- Media type: Print (Hardback)
- Pages: 224
- ISBN: 0-7869-5016-1

Player's Handbook 2 is a supplement to the 4th edition of the Dungeons & Dragons role-playing game.

== Contents ==
The Player's Handbook 2 includes eight classes: the avenger, barbarian, bard, druid, invoker, shaman, sorcerer, and warden, and five races: the deva, gnome, goliath, half-orc, and shifter.

== Publication history ==
The 4th edition Player's Handbook 2, subtitled Arcane, Divine and Primal Heroes, was released on March 17, 2009. The book was designed by Jeremy Crawford, Mike Mearls, and James Wyatt, and featured cover art by Daniel Scott and interior art by Steve Argyle, Eric Belisle, Michael Bierek, Devon Caddy-Lee, Mitch Cotie, Thomas Denmark, Eric Deschamps, Brian Despain, Vincent Dutrait, Steve Ellis, Wayne England, Howard Lyon, Mike May, Raven Mimura, William O'Connor, Hector Ortiz, Wayne Reynolds, Chris Seaman, John Stanko, Matias Tapia, Franz Vohwinkel, Eva Widermann, and James Zhang.

Shannon Appelcline commented that with Fourth Edition Dungeons & Dragons, Wizards intended to publish only three books for each setting, beginning with the poorly-received Forgotten Realms Campaign Guide, Forgotten Realms Player's Guide and Scepter Tower of Spellgard in 2008, and "The next year saw the clockwork production of Dungeon Master's Guide 2 (2009), Monster Manual 2 (2009) and Player's Handbook 2 (2009), as well as the reappearance of Eberron through the typical two books and an adventure – the latter released as part of Free RPG Day. These setting books were much better accepted, perhaps because the 4e nay-sayers had now moved on to other games."

== Reception ==
The book reached No. 28 on USA Today's bestseller list the week of March 26, 2009 and No. 14 on the Wall Street Journal's non-fiction bestseller list a week later.
