= Primal Power =

2009 role-playing game supplement

- Genre: Role-playing game
- Publisher: Wizards of the Coast
- Publication date: 2009
- Media type: Print
- ISBN: 9780786950232

Primal Power is a supplement to the 4th edition of the Dungeons & Dragons role-playing game.

== Contents ==
Primal Power adds new options for barbarians, druids, shamans, and wardens. This book offers hundreds of new options for D&D characters, specifically focusing on heroes who draw power from the spirits that preserve and sustain the world. It provides new archetypal builds for barbarians, druids, shamans, and wardens, including new character powers, feats, paragon paths, and epic destinies.

== Publication history ==
Primal Power was written by Logan Bonner, Rob Heinsoo, Mike Mearls, and Robert J. Schwalb, and published in 2009. The book features art by Steve Argyle, Ralph Beisner, Eric Belisle, Kerem Beyit, Mitch Cotie, Brian "Chippy" Dugan, Jesper Ejsing, Jason Engle, Tomas Giorello, Howard Lyon, Warren Mahy, Raven Mimura, James Nelson, William O'Connor, Héctor Ortiz, Wayne Reynolds, Chris Seaman, Eva Widermann, Sam Wood, and Ben Wootten.

Shannon Appelcline commented that the first product line for Fourth Edition Dungeons & Dragons was "a set of 'power' books, beginning with Martial Power (2008), which offered new options for players, organised by the new power sources of D&D. Primal Power (2009) and Psionic Power (2010) would focus on new power sources, after each had been introduced in the Player’s Handbook published earlier the same year."

== Reception ==
Viktor Coble listed the entire Power series - including Martial Power, Martial Power 2, Divine Power, Arcane Power, Psionic Power, and Primal Power - as #2 on CBR's 2021 "D&D: 10 Best Supplemental Handbooks" list, stating that "What sets the power series apart – besides their updated rules – is how they translate really well to 5e. Whereas, the "Complete" series needs a little more work. The rules have both been pared down and expanded upon in this guide, which makes picking up a copy for whatever type of character is most in favor worth it."
