= Savage Tide =

Dungeons & Dragons Adventure Path

The front cover of Dungeon Issue 139 (October 2006), illustrated by Dan Scott, wherein began the Savage Tide Adventure Path.

The Savage Tide Adventure Path (or simply Savage Tide) is the third Adventure Path for the Dungeons & Dragons role-playing game, published over twelve installments from October 2006 through September 2007 in Dungeon magazine. It begins in the city of Sasserine, just north of the city of Cauldron, which serves as the setting for the first Adventure Path, Shackled City.

== Story ==
From the June 2006 promotional announcement in Dungeon Adventures:

[T]he Savage Tide Adventure Path [is] a 12-installment campaign designed to take characters from the heady days of first level all the way to the responsibilities of level 20. Running every month from issue #139 to the milestone Dungeon #150, the Savage Tide takes players on an ocean voyage that begins in the fecund southern jungles and leads deep into the heart of the treacherous Lower Planes.

== Setting ==
The story nominally takes place in the Greyhawk campaign setting, but is designed to be easily adapted to any of the other Dungeons & Dragons settings such as Forgotten Realms or Eberron. Much of the action is staged on the Isle of Dread, and Dungeon editor Erik Mona stated that, partially because of this, the campaign would contain a number of Mystara references, including specific monsters which had not previously appeared in the then-current edition of Dungeons & Dragons.

== Summary ==
The campaign begins in the city of Sasserine and nearby environs, where the party discovers the first clues about an impending disaster called the Savage Tide. The action then moves to the Isle of Dread for the middle portion of the series, and the party must deal with the dangers of the island and unearth more information about the Savage Tide. After a short stop in the depraved pirate city of Scuttlecove, the final third of the campaign takes place in the Abyss, where the party must find a way to stop the Savage Tide and confront its architect.

The Savage Tide Adventure Path consists of the following installments:

Chapter	Title	Authors	Illustrators	Levels	Issue	Date
1	"There Is No Honor"	James Jacobs	Ben Wootten; Dan Scott (cover); Robert Lazzaretti (cartography for entire series)	1–3	139	October 2006
In this opening adventure, the characters are drawn into a murderous family feud. Undead pirates and a powerful thieves guild feature heavily.
2	"The Bullywug Gambit"	Nicolas Logue	Warren Mahy, B. Wootten	3–5	140	November 2006
Hired to find a missing brother, the characters discover a secret hideout and witness the effects of the Savage Tide.
3	"The Sea Wyvern's Wake"	Richard Pett	W. Mahy, B. Wootten	5–7	141	December 2006
The characters begin their journey to the Isle of Dread; the lost city of Tamoachan and a monstrous sargasso are featured highlights.
4	"Here There Be Monsters"	Jason Bulmahn	W. Mahy, B. Wootten	7–8	142	January 2007
Shipwrecked on the Isle of Dread, the characters travel south along the coast to the colony of Farshore.
5	"Tides of Dread"	Stephen S. Greer, Gary Holian	W. Mahy, B. Wootten	9–10	143	February 2007
Warned of an imminent attack by a pirate fleet, the characters seek to fortify the colony of Farshore.
6	"The Lightless Depths"	F. Wesley Schneider, James L. Sutter	W. Mahy, B. Wootten	11–12	144	March 2007
On a quest underground to seek the source of mysterious pearls, the characters discover a horrifying city of slumbering aboleths.
7	"City of Broken Idols"	Tito Leati	W. Mahy, B. Wootten	13–15	145	April 2007
Still seeking clues to the mysterious pearls, the characters travel to the taboo central plateau of the Isle of Dread, to confront the terrible creatures that live there.
8	"Serpents of Scuttlecove"	James Jacobs, Richard Pett	W. Mahy, B. Wootten; Tomás Giorello (cover)	15–17	146	May 2007
The characters once again board the Sea Wyvern, this time to sail for Scuttlecove – a hideous city of pirates, slavers, cannibals, and worse – in search of clues to the final Savage Tide and the rescue of their patron.
9	"Into the Maw"	Robert J. Schwalb	W. Mahy, B. Wootten; Mark Sasso (cover)	17–18	147	June 2007
The party sails into the Abyss itself, seeking to infiltrate a demonic prison fortress and turn its fiendish factions against each other.
10	"Wells of Darkness"	Eric L. Boyd	W. Mahy, B. Wootten; Andrew Hou (cover)	18–19	148	July 2007
To learn the secret of stopping the Savage Tide, the party must free Shami-Amourae, succubus-goddess and former consort of Demogorgon, from the Wells of Darkness, deep in the Abyss.
11	"Enemies of My Enemy"	Wolfgang Baur	W. Mahy, B. Wootten; James Ryman (cover)	19–20	149	August 2007
Our heroes travel to Hades, Arborea, and the depths of the Abyss in order to recruit allies against Demogorgon from the eladrin court, demons, and even other demon lords.
12	"Prince of Demons"	Greg A. Vaughan	W. Mahy, B. Wootten; Wayne Reynolds (cover)	20	150	September 2007
In the final chapter of the Savage Tide Adventure Path, an army of demons and eladrin stands ready to mount an assault on Demogorgon's Abyssal realm of Gaping Maw. The party must take advantage of this distraction and prevent Demogorgon from activating the Savage Tide and driving a world insane.
