= Martial Power 2 =

Dungeons and Dragons 4e supplement book

- Cover art by Ralph Horsley, 2010
- Subject: Role-playing games
- Genre: Dungeons & Dragons
- Publisher: Wizards of the Coast
- Publication date: 2010
- Media type: Trade hardcover
- ISBN: 978-0-7869-5389-9

Martial Power 2 is a supplement published by Wizards of the Coast (WotC) in 2010 for the 4th edition of the Dungeons & Dragons fantasy role-playing game. The book is a sequel to 2008's Martial Power; like its predecessor, Martial Power 2 provides new options for four specific character classes, as well as some general martial variants.

== Description ==
Martial Power 2 provides new options and powers for the fighter, the ranger, the rogue, and the warlord. New material for each these classes is given in a separate chapter that starts with new character generation options:

- Fighter: "Brawler"
- Warlord: "Master of War", "Skirmisher"
- Ranger: "Hunter", "Marauder"
- Rogue: "Shadow Thief"

New class abilities, skills and powers are then keyed to these variants.

The final chapter includes some new martial capabilities for all classes, including different schools of "battle styles", and various martial exercises and abilities.

== Publication history ==
In 2008, shortly after the publication of the 4th edition of D&D, WotC released a number of rules expansion books outlining new options for player characters. The first of these was Martial Power (2008), followed by Arcane Power (2009), and Divine Power (2009). In 2010, WotC released Martial Power 2, a 160-page hardcover book designed by Richard Baker, Tavis Allison, Eytan Bernstein, and Robert J. Schwalb. The front cover art was by Ralph Horsley and the back cover art was by Zoltan Boros & Gabor Szikszai, with interior art by Dave Allsop, Ralph Beisner, Kerem Beyit, Zoltan Boros & Gabor Szikszai, Ed Cox, Julie Dillon, Vincent Dutrait, Steve Ellis, Adam Gillespie, Torstein Nordstrand, Michael Phillippi, Wayne Reynolds, Chris Seaman, Arnie Swekel, Joel Thomas, Eva Widermann, and Ben Wootten.

WotC would produce two more books in the "Power" series: Primal Power (2009) and Psionic Power (2010).

== Reception ==
Viktor Coble listed the entire Power series as #2 on CBR's 2021 "D&D: 10 Best Supplemental Handbooks" list, stating that "What sets the Power series apart – besides their updated rules – is how they translate really well to 5e [the 5th edition of D&D]. Whereas, the "Complete" series needs a little more work. The rules have both been pared down and expanded upon in this guide, which makes picking up a copy for whatever type of character is most in favor worth it."

In his 2014 book Designers & Dragons: The '90s, game historian Shannon Appelcline noted that the first four books of the "Power" line — Martial Power, Arcane Power, Divine Powerand Martial Power 2 — focused on power sources first presented in the 4th Edition's Player's Handbook (2008), geared towards the standard power sources in the game. The two other books in the "Power" line, Primal Power and Psionic Power, explored new and more esoteric power sources.
