= Psionic Power =

2010 role-playing game supplement

- Genre: Role-playing game
- Publisher: Wizards of the Coast
- Publication date: 2010
- Media type: Print
- ISBN: 978-0786955602

Psionic Power is a supplement to the 4th edition of the Dungeons & Dragons role-playing game.

== Contents ==
Psionic Power adds new options for ardents, battleminds, monks, and psions. Supplementing the Player's Handbook 3 is Psionic Power, a D&D supplement that explores the psionic power source in more detail. This supplement presents hundreds of new options for D&D characters, specifically focusing on heroes who channel the power of the mind. It provides new builds for the ardent, battlemind, monk, and psion classes, including new character powers, feats, paragon paths, and epic destinies.

== Publication history ==
Psionic Power was written by Ari Marmell, Stephen Radney-MacFarland, Peter Schaefer, Stephen Schubert, Robert J. Schwalb, and published in 2010. The book features art by Ralph Beisner, Eric Belisle, Steven Belledin, Kerem Beyit, Leon Cortez, Thomas Denmark, Wayne England, Kate Irwin, McLean Kendree, Roberto Marchesi, Sean V. Murray, William O'Connor, Héctor Ortiz, Lucio Parrillo, Mike Schley, Chris Seaman, Keven Smith, John Stanko, Emi Tanji, Matias Tapia, and Ben Wootten.

Shannon Appelcline commented that the first product line for Fourth Edition Dungeons & Dragons was "a set of 'power' books, beginning with Martial Power (2008), which offered new options for players, organised by the new power sources of D&D. Primal Power (2009) and Psionic Power (2010) would focus on new power sources, after each had been introduced in the Player’s Handbook published earlier the same year."

== Reception ==
Viktor Coble listed the entire Power series - including Martial Power, Martial Power 2, Divine Power, Arcane Power, Psionic Power, and Primal Power - as #2 on CBR's 2021 "D&D: 10 Best Supplemental Handbooks" list, stating that "What sets the power series apart – besides their updated rules – is how they translate really well to 5e. Whereas, the "Complete" series needs a little more work. The rules have both been pared down and expanded upon in this guide, which makes picking up a copy for whatever type of character is most in favor worth it."
