= Dungeon Master's Guide 2 =

2009 role-playing game supplement

- Genre: Role-playing game
- Publisher: Wizards of the Coast
- Publication date: 2009
- Media type: Print
- ISBN: 978-0786952441

Dungeon Master's Guide 2 is a supplement to the 4th edition of the Dungeons & Dragons role-playing game.

== Contents ==
Dungeon Master's Guide 2 gives expansions for the Dungeon Master to add to a campaign.

The Dungeon Master's Guide 2 contains information on group storytelling, advanced encounters, skill challenges, customizing monsters, adventures and paragon campaigns. Although it does contain artifacts, it does not contain standard magic items.

== Publication history ==
Dungeon Master's Guide 2 was written by Greg Gorden, Robin D. Laws, and Mike Mearls, and published on September 19, 2009. The 224-page hardcover book features art by Steve Argyle, Ryan Barger, Kerem Beyit, Zoltan Boros, Julie Dillon, Brian "Chippy" Dugan, Vincent Dutrait, Jason Engle, Randy Gallegos, Tomas Giorello, Ralph Horsley, Mari Kolkowsky, Howard Lyon, Raven Mimura, Lucio Parrillo, Wayne Reynolds, Jon Schindehette, Georgi "Calader" Simeonov, Amelia Stoner, Gábor Szikszai, and Eva Widermann.

Shannon Appelcline commented that with Fourth Edition Dungeons & Dragons, Wizards intended to publish only three books for each setting, beginning with the poorly-received Forgotten Realms Campaign Guide, Forgotten Realms Player's Guide and Scepter Tower of Spellgard in 2008, and "The next year saw the clockwork production of Dungeon Master's Guide 2 (2009), Monster Manual 2 (2009) and Player's Handbook 2 (2009), as well as the reappearance of Eberron through the typical two books and an adventure – the latter released as part of Free RPG Day. These setting books were much better accepted, perhaps because the 4e nay-sayers had now moved on to other games."
