= Greg A. Vaughan =

American writer and game designer

Greg A. Vaughan is an American writer who creates material for roleplaying games.

== Works ==
Greg A. Vaughan's role-playing credits for the Dungeons & Dragons role-playing game include Drow of the Underdark, Scepter Tower of Spellgard, Anauroch: The Empire of Shade, and The Twilight Tomb.

He was written several adventures for Dungeon magazine and Paizo's Pathfinder and GameMastery lines. His Pathfinder work includes Pathfinder Adventure Path #6: Spires of Xin-Shalast, and Pathfinder Adventure Path #11: Skeletons of Scarwall.

=== Wizards of the Coast ===
==== Dungeons & Dragons Roleplaying Game ====
Title	Year
The Twilight Tomb	2006
Drow of the Underdark (with Ari Marmell, Robert J. Schwalb, and Anthony Pryor)	2007
Anauroch: The Empire of Shade (with Thomas M. Reid and Skip Williams)	2007
Scepter Tower of Spellgard (with David Noonan)	2008
Ghosts of Saltmarsh ("Tammeraut's Fate")	2019
Mythic Odysseys of Theros ("No Silent Secret")	2020

==== Dungeon Magazine Online (A Dungeons & Dragons Roleplaying Game Supplement) ====
Title	Issue #	Year
"The Plague Tree"	152	2007
"The Lost Mines of Karak" (Scales of War AP)	159	2008
"The Brothers Gray"	172	2009

=== Paizo Publishing ===
==== Dungeon Magazine ====
Title	Issue #	Year
"Tammeraut's Fate"*	106	2004
"Torrents of Dread"	114	2004
"Touch of the Abyss"	117	2004
"Istivin: City of Shadows" (with Erik Mona)	117	2004
"Shadows of the Abyss"	118	2005
"Wrath of the Abyss"	119	2005
"The Hateful Legacy"	131	2006
"Kings of the Rift" (Age of Worms AP)	133	2006
"The Coming Storm"	136	2006
"Verdigris Wyrm"	142	2007
"Prince of Demons" (Savage Tide AP)	150	2007

- "Tammeraut's Fate" was updated and revised in the 2019 Ghosts of Saltmarsh compilation by Wizards of the Coast.

==== Dragon Magazine ====
Title	Issue #	Year
"The Ecology of the Dracolich"* (with Richard Pett)	344	2006

- "The Ecology of the Dracolich" was reprinted in 2007 in the Dragon: Monster Ecologies compilation by Paizo Publishing.

==== Pathfinder Roleplaying Game ====
Title	Year
Pathfinder Roleplaying Game Bestiary (contributor)	2009
Pathfinder Roleplaying Game Bestiary 2 (contributor)	2011

==== Pathfinder Chronicles/Pathfinder Campaign Setting/Pathfinder Modules ====
Title	Book Line	Year
Classic Monsters Revisited - Orcs	Pathfinder Chronicles	2008
Into the Darklands (with James Jacobs)	Pathfinder Chronicles	2008
W2: River Into Darkness	GameMastery Module	2008
Pathfinder Chronicles Campaign Setting (Mwangi)	Pathfinder Chronicles	2008
Dungeon Denizens Revisited (Purple Worm)	Pathfinder Chronicles	2009
The Witchwar Legacy (with Rob McCreary)	Pathfinder Module	2010
Mythical Monsters Revisited (Wendigo)	Pathfinder Campaign Setting	2012
Inner Sea Bestiary (Apostasy Wraith, Charnel Colossus, Petrified Maiden, Shadow Giant, Thin Man, Whirlmaw)	Pathfinder Campaign Setting	2012
Cradle of Night (with James Jacobs, Neil Spicer, and F. Wesley Schneider)	Pathfinder Module	2018

==== Pathfinder Society Scenarios ====
Number	Title	Season	Year
PSS 03	Murder on the Silken Caravan	0	2008
PSS 20	King Xeros of Old Azlant	0	2009
PSS 42	Echoes of the Everwar, Part II: Watcher of the Ages	1	2010
PSS 02-06	The Heresy of Man, Part I: First Heresy (with Kevin Wright)	2	2010
PSS 02-07	The Heresy of Man, Part II: Where Dark Things Sleep (with Kevin Wright)	2	2010
PSS 02-09	The Heresy of Man, Part III: Beneath Forgotten Sands (with Kevin Wright)	2	2010

==== Pathfinder Adventure Paths ====
Title	AP	Volume #	Year
Spires of Xin-Shalast	Rise of the Runelords	6	2008
"Karzoug the Claimer"	Rise of the Runelords	6	2008
"Hazard's on the World's Roof"	Rise of the Runelords	6	2008
"Bestiary" (Crag Spider, Denizen of Leng, Kuchrima, Harridan, Hungerer [with Richard Pett], Rune Giant, Wendigo)	Rise of the Runelords	6	2008
Rise of the Runelords Anniversary Edition (with James Jacobs, Richard Pett, Wolfgang Baur, Nicolas Logue, and Stephen S. Greer)	anniversary compilation	-	2012
Skeletons of Scarwall	Curse of the Crimson Throne	11	2008
"Bestiary" (with Sean K Reynolds) (Chained Spirit, Danse Macabre, Gug, The Prince in Chains, Umbral Dragon)	Curse of the Crimson Throne	11	2008
Curse of the Crimson Throne (with James Jacobs, Michael Kortes, Tito Leati, Nicolas Logue, Richard Pett, and F. Wesley Schneider)	revised and expanded compilation	-	2016
Shadow in the Sky	Second Darkness	13	2008
"Riddleport: City of Cyphers"	Second Darkness	13	2008
"The Gold Goblin" (with E. Jordan Bojar, Gwen Page, and Mike Selinker)	Second Darkness	13	2008
"Bestiary" (Darklands Sentinel, Fungal Crawler, Monstrous Cockroach, Flesh-Eating Cockroach Swarm, Swamp Barracuda)	Second Darkness	13	2008
"Pathfinder's Journal: ...And Your Enemies Closer"	Second Darkness	15	2008
The Impossible Eye	Legacy of Fire	23	2009
"Bestiary" (Black Jinni, Get of Iblis, Nephilim)	Legacy of Fire	23	2009
Mother of Flies	Council of Thieves	29	2010
The Varnhold Vanishing*	Kingmaker	33	2010
Vaults of Madness	Serpent's Skull	40	2010
Wake of the Watcher (with Rob McCreary)	Carrion Crown	46	2011
"Bestiary" (Moits of Shub-Niggurath)	Carrion Crown	46	2011
Night of Frozen Shadows	Jade Regent	50	2011
Raiders of the Fever Sea	Skull & Shackles	56	2012
"Bestiary" (Canopy Creeper)	Skull & Shackles	56	2012
Shards of Sin	Shattered Star	61	2012
"Leng: The Terror Beyond Dreams"	Shattered Star	65	2012
The Witch Queen's Revenge	Reign of Winter	72	2013
The Midnight Isles (with James Jacobs)	Wrath of the Righteous	76	2013
"The Perilous Wastes"	Mummy's Mask	82	2014
"Ecology of the Robot"	Iron Gods	90	2014
"Pathfinder's Journal: The Travails of Kilig the Steersman"	Giantslayer	93	2015
"Pathfinder Adventure Path Friends and Foes" (Chessadril Odranata)	Hell's Rebels	100	2016
"Bestiary" (Ez-Azael)	Hell's Vengeance	107	2016
"Bestiary" (Hooded Harbinger)	Strange Aeons	112	2016
"Ecology of the Vault Builders"	Ironfang Invasion	120	2017
"Ecology of the Alghollthu"	Ruins of Azlant	121	2017
"Bestiary" (Axial Monitor)	War for the Crown	131	2018
Rise of New Thassilon	Return of the Runelords	138	2019
"Seal-Breakers"	Tyrant's Grasp	141	2019
"Adventure Toolbox" (with Owen K.C. Stephens, James L. Sutter, and Linda Zayas-Palmer) (Carnivorous Crystal, Dalos, Deculi, Devourer, Dragonscarred Dead, Forge-Spurned, Gashadokuro, Magma Dragon)	Age of Ashes	148	2019
Life's Long Shadows	Extinction Curse	153	2020
"Swardlands Gazetteer"	Extinction Curse	153	2020
"Adventure Toolbox" (with Anthony Bono, Jacob W. Michaels, Andrew Mullen, Patrick Renie, Alex Riggs, and Timothy Snow) (Xulgath Stoneliege, Ginjana Mindkeeper, Skarja, Thessekka)	Extinction Curse	153	2020

- The Varnhold Vanishing is one of the original adventures on which the Pathfinder: Kingmaker CRPG is based.

=== Other Publishers ===
Title	Publisher	Year
Blood Waters*	Sinister Adventures	2008
Freeport Companion: Pathfinder Roleplaying Game Edition	Green Ronin Publishing	2010
Your Whispering Homunculus (guest contributor)	Kobold Press	2012
The Fiddler's Lament	Legendary Games	2012
Gothic Campaign Compendium ("The Fiddler's Lament" and "Feasting at Lanterngeist")	Legendary Games	2013
Aegis of Empires Player's Guide	Legendary Games	2019
AE1: The Book in the Old House (with Alistair J. Rigg)	Legendary Games	2020
AE2: The Ebon Soul (with Jeffrey Swank)	Legendary Games	2020
AE3: When Comes the Moon (with Matthew Goodall)	Legendary Games	2020
AE4: Legend of the Burning Star (with Steven T. Helt)	Legendary Games	2020
AE5: Race for Shataakh-Uulm (with Tom Knauss)	Legendary Games	2020
AE6: Knight Fall in Old Curgantium (with Anthony Pryor)	Legendary Games	2020
Aegis of Empires GM's Guide	Legendary Games	2020
Aegis of Empires Design Journal	Legendary Games	2020
Aegis of Empires Adventure Path (with Matthew Goodall, Steven T. Helt, Tom Knauss, Anthony Pryor, Alistair J. Rigg, and Jeffrey Swank)	Legendary Games	2021
Icebound (contributor [uncredited] {Faiths of the Ice}/developer)	Michael Mars Gaming	2021

- Blood Waters was updated and reprinted in 2012 in Razor Coast by Frog God Games.

=== Frog God Games ===
Title	Role	Year
ST1: The Desolation, Part 1 - The Edge of Oblivion	author	2010
ST2: The Desolation, Part 2 - The Ghosts of Victory	author	2010
ST3: The Desolation, Part 3 - The Western Front	author	2010
ST4: Temple-City of Orcus, Part 1 - The Tower of Weeping Sores	author	2010
ST5: Temple-City of Orcus, Part 2 - The Lower City	author	2010
ST6: Temple-City of Orcus, Part 3 - The Harrow Lanes	author	2010
ST7: Temple-City of Orcus, Part 4 - The Crooked Tower	author	2010
ST8: Temple-City of Orcus, Part 5 - Foundations of Infamy	author	2010
NS1: Vengeance of the Long Serpent	developer	2010
ST9: The Hidden Citadel, Part 1 - At the Feet of Orcus	author	2011
ST10: The Hidden Citadel, Part 2 - Echoes of Despair	author	2011
ST11: The Hidden Citadel, Part 3 - The Throne of the Demon Prince	author	2011
ST12: The Hidden Citadel, Part 4 - In the Belly of the Beast	author	2011
ST13: The Hidden Citadel, Part 5 - The Mind of Chaos	author	2011
ST14: The Hidden Citadel, Part 6 - Caverns of the Barrier	author	2011
The Tome of Horrors Complete	contributor/lead developer	2011
NS2: Beyond the Wailing Mountains	developer	2011
NS3: The Death Curse of Sven Oakenfist	developer	2011
NS4: Blood on the Snow	developer	2011
ONS2: Death in the Painted Canyons	developer	2011
SNS4: The Mires of Mourning (with Kevin Wright)	co-author	2011
The Slumbering Tsar Saga	author	2012
Unusual Suspects	developer	2012
Rappan Athuk*	contributor/developer	2012
ONS5: Scorned	developer	2012
Razor Coast	contributor/developer	2012
Razor Coast: Freebooter's Guide to the Razor Coast	contributor/developer	2013
Razor Coast: Heart of the Razor	developer	2013
Razor Coast: Fire as She Bears	developer	2013
Razor Coast: Call of the Frog God	developer	2013
ONS6: Curse of Shadowhold	developer	2013
Tome of Horrors 4	contributor [uncredited]	2013
LL3: Sword of Air	contributor/developer	2014
Dunes of Desolation	developer	2014
LL4: Cults of the Sundered Kingdoms (with Patrick Lawinger, Casey Christofferson, and David Brohman)	co-author/developer	2015
Cults of the Sundered Kingdoms: Player's Guide	developer	2015
LL5: Borderland Provinces (with Matthew J. Finch and Bill Webb)	co-author	2015
Borderland Provinces: Players Gazetteer	contributor [uncredited]	2015
Fields of Blood	developer	2015
Quests of Doom	developer	2015
Quests of Doom 2	co-author/developer	2015
LL6: The Northlands Saga Complete (with Kenneth Spencer and Kevin Wright)	co-author/developer	2015
The Northlands Saga Complete: Player's Guide	co-author/developer	2016
NLS1: Winter's Teeth	developer	2016
NLS2: The Raid	developer	2016
NLS3: The Drowned Maiden	developer	2016
NLS4: Oath of the Predator	developer	2016
NLS5: The Hidden Huscarl	developer	2016
NLS6: One Night in Valhalla	developer	2016
Quests of Doom 3	developer	2016
Mountains of Madness	contributor [uncredited]/developer	2016
The Tome of Blighted Horrors (with Richard Pett, John Ling, Pete Pollard, Alistair Rigg, and Jeffrey Swank)	co-author/developer	2016
LL8: Bard's Gate (with Casey Christofferson, Matthew J. Finch, and Skeeter Green)	co-author/developer	2016
TB3: Bloody Jack	author	2016
TB4: The Crucible	developer	2016
TB1: The Crooked Nail	developer	2017
TB2: Horror in the Sinks	developer	2017
LL7: The Blight: Richard Pett's Crooked City (with Richard Pett, Matthew J. Finch, and Bill Webb)	co-author/developer	2017
The Blight: Player's Guide	developer	2017
The Blight: Player's Handbook	contributor/developer	2017
The Blight: GM Guide	contributor/developer	2017
TB5: Children of the Harvest (with Bill Webb)	co-author [uncredited]/developer	2017
Marshes of Malice	contributor [uncredited]/developer	2017
Quests of Doom 4	developer [uncredited]	2017
The World of the Lost Lands	co-creator [uncredited]/co-author/associate developer	2019
The World of the Lost Lands Map Folio	creator [uncredited]	2019
Developer's Notes for The World of the Lost Lands	creator	2019

- Rappan Athuk was updated to 5e D&D, expanded, and reprinted in 2018 in by Frog God Games.
