= Elder Evils =

2007 role-playing game supplement

- Author: Robert J. Schwalb
- Genre: Role-playing game
- Publisher: Wizards of the Coast
- Publication date: December 2007
- Media type: Print (Hardback)
- Pages: 160
- ISBN: 978-0-7869-4733-1

Elder Evils is an official supplement for the 3.5 edition of the Dungeons & Dragons role-playing game. This book presents alien, monstrous evils and is designed as a way of providing game masters a means of ending a current campaign.

== Contents ==
It includes new content for epic level characters, in the form of extremely powerful, alien monstrosities intent on destroying the world. It is designed as a way of providing game masters a means of ending a current campaign.

The book presents nine “Elder Evils”:

- Atropus, the World Born Dead (an undead godling in the form of a small moon)
- Father Llymic, a being of intense power from the Far Realm who escaped the plane of madness to destroy the world but was encased in ice by elven mages
- The Hulks of Zoretha (five gargantuan statues)
- The Leviathan (a monster of the deep composed of leftover chaotic energies from creation)
- Pandorym (an evil force from the places between the planes)
- Ragnorra, Mother of Monsters (a hideous malformed monstrosity)
- Sertrous (a vast demonic snake)
- The Worm that Walks (a 30’ tall giant composed of worms and maggots, and connected with the demi-god Kyuss)
- Zargon the Returner (a vicious beast crowned with a solitary horn)

== Publication history ==
Elder Evils was authored by Robert J. Schwalb, with Jason Bulmahn, Greg Gorden, James Jacobs, Rhiannon Louve, Michael McArtor, and Anthony Pryor, and published by Wizards of the Coast in December 2007. The cover artist is Michael Komarck, with interior art by Miguel Coimbra, Daarken, Wayne England, Ralph Horsley, Izzy, Howard Lyon, Michael Phillippi, Skan Srisuwan, Francis Tsai, Franz Vohwinkel, Eva Widermann, and James Zhang.

== Other Elder Evils ==
A 10th Elder Evil, called Shothragot is presented in Dragon #362. It serves the god Tharizdun. The Elder Evil Zurguth, the Feasting Vast, was also in introduced in Dragon issue #358, which describes his accidental creation of the Kaorti.

The D&D book Lords of Madness, published previously (in 2005), also presented Elder Evils (page 27). The five described in that book are all greatly respected by the aboleth. They are provided with the following names:

- Bolothamogg, He Who Watches from Beyond the Stars
- Holashner, the Hunger Below
- Piscaethces, the Blood Queen
- Shothotugg, Eater of Worlds
- Y’chak (the Violet Flame)

== Reception ==
Elder Evils received the silver ENnie Award for Best Monster/Adversary.
