= Martial Power =

2008 role-playing game supplement

- Author: Rob Heinsoo, Nicolas Logue, David Noonan, Chris Sims
- Subject: Role-playing games
- Genre: Dungeons & Dragons
- Publisher: Wizards of the Coast
- Publication date: November 2008
- Media type: Trade hardcover
- Pages: 160
- ISBN: 978-0-7869-4981-6
- OCLC: 298596170
- LC Class: GV1469.62.D84 D836 2000
- Followed by: Arcane Power

Martial Power is a supplement for the 4th edition of the Dungeons & Dragons fantasy role-playing game. It contains additional options and rules for fighters, rangers, rogues, and warlords, including new builds for each class to further customize a character, such as the "beastmaster ranger," "bravura warlord," and "resourceful warlord".

== Contents ==
Martial Power, the first supplement in the Power series of books in Dungeons & Dragons, 4th edition, published and debuted new options for the classes that were in the Martial power source. It also expanded and refined the first builds of each class (originally in the Player's Handbook) by giving new powers and paragon paths.

=== Fighter ===
The fighter, the martial defender, received two new builds to be used in conjunction with the builds in Player's Handbook. The battlerager fighter works as a berserker fighter, which utilizes the new Invigorating keyword, which grants the battlerager temporary hit points to make up for their lack of armor. The tempest fighter is a dual wielding fighter build with great mobility.

=== Ranger ===
The ranger, a martial striker, received one new build in Martial Power, the beastmaster. Instead of choosing an archery or a two weapon fighting benefit as detailed in the Player's Handbook, the ranger could instead gain a beast to fight alongside with. The beast is used with new beast powers, which grant it attacks and their own effects.

=== Rogue ===
The rogue, a martial striker, gained two new builds in Martial Power, the aerialist rogue and the cutthroat rogue. The aerialist rogue uses the Acrobatics skill to maneuver around enemies and the cutthroat uses the Intimidation skill to rattle and shake foes.

=== Warlord ===
The warlord, the martial leader, can use two new builds in conjunction with the two builds in Player's Handbook. The bravura warlord uses daring, and often brash, tactics that could harm the warlord but give great benefits to their allies. The resourceful warlord is a soldier on the battlefield that adapts to certain situations.

== Publication history ==
Martial Power was published in November 2008 and was designed by Rob Heinsoo, David Noonan, Chris Sims, and Robert J. Schwalb. Cover art was by William O'Connor, with interior art by Steve Belledin, Leonardo Borazio, Steve Ellis, Wayne England, Jason A. Engle, Gonzalo Flores, Adam Gillespie, Brian Hagan, Jeremy Jarvis, Ron Lemen, Wes Louie, Howard Lyon, Lee Moyer, Lucio Parrillo, Jim Pavelec, Steve Prescott, Vincent Proce, Ron Spears, Ron Spencer, Stephen Tappin, Mark Tedin, Beth Trott, and Ben Wootten.

Martial Power was the first book in the initial product line for 4th edition D&D, a set of books which provided options for player characters and the focus for each book was one of the power sources associated with the new edition.

Martial Power 2 was published in February 2010.

== Reception ==
Viktor Coble listed the entire Power series - including Martial Power, Martial Power 2, Divine Power, Arcane Power, Psionic Power, and Primal Power - as #2 on CBR's 2021 "D&D: 10 Best Supplemental Handbooks" list, stating that "What sets the power series apart – besides their updated rules – is how they translate really well to 5e. Whereas, the "Complete" series needs a little more work. The rules have both been pared down and expanded upon in this guide, which makes picking up a copy for whatever type of character is most in favor worth it."
