= Faiths of Eberron =

2006 role-playing game supplement

- Genre: Role-playing game
- Publisher: Wizards of the Coast
- Publication date: September 2006
- Media type: Print
- ISBN: 0-7869-3934-6

Faiths of Eberron is a supplement to the 3.5 edition of the Dungeons & Dragons role-playing game.

== Contents ==
Faiths of Eberron is an accessory for the Eberron setting that presents detailed descriptions of the major religions of the setting, including the rival pantheons known as the Sovereign Host and the Dark Six, the young faith of the Silver Flame, and the shadowy Blood of Vol. The book also includes details of lesser religions, such as the beliefs of the warforged, the mad Cults of the Dragon Below, and the various druid sects of the Eldeen Reaches. This supplement also includes new feats, spells, prestige classes, and equipment to give more options to both devout worshipers and sometime followers.

== Publication history ==
Faiths of Eberron was written by Jennifer Clarke Wilkes, Ari Marmell, and C.A. Suleiman, and published in September 2006. Cover art was by Wayne Reynolds, with interior art by Kalman Andrasofszky, Mitch Cotie, Howard Lyon, Warren Mahy, Michael Martin, Lucio Parrillo, and Mark Tedin.
