= Exemplars of Evil =

2007 role-playing game supplement by Robert J. Schwalb

- Author: Robert J. Schwalb
- Genre: Role-playing game
- Publisher: Wizards of the Coast
- Publication date: September 2007
- Media type: Print
- Pages: 160
- ISBN: 978-0786943616

Exemplars of Evil is a supplement to the 3.5 edition of the Dungeons & Dragons role-playing game written by Robert J. Schwalb.

== Contents ==
Exemplars of Evil is an accessory that shows how to build memorable villains for Dungeons & Dragons and presents eight ready-to-play villainous groups of various levels. Each villain comes with complete game statistics, as well as adventure seeds, campaign hooks, statistics for minions, and a fully described lair.

== Publication history ==
Exemplars of Evil was written by Robert J. Schwalb, and published in September 2007.

Cover art was by Ron Spears, with interior art by Jason Chan, Eric Deschamps, Randy Gallegos, Tomás Giorello, Ron Hodgson, Ralph Horsley, Warren Mahy, Michael Phillippi, Eva Widermann, Kieran Yanner, and James Zhang.

The brief that Schwalb received for this project included a selection of nine archetypical villains, which he, Eytan Bernstein, Creighton Broadhurst, Steve Kenson, Kolja Raven Liquette, and Allen Rausch were assigned to develop into more interesting and compelling villains.
