= Forgotten Realms Player's Guide =

2008 role-playing game supplement

- Genre: Role-playing game
- Publisher: Wizards of the Coast
- Publication date: 2008
- Media type: Print
- ISBN: 978-0-7869-4929-8

The Forgotten Realms Player's Guide is a supplement to the 4th edition of the Dungeons & Dragons role-playing game.

== Contents ==
The Forgotten Realms Player's Guide presents the changed Forgotten Realms setting from the point of view of the adventurers exploring it. This guide includes everything a player needs to create a character for a D&D campaign in the 4th edition Forgotten Realms setting, including new feats, new character powers, and new paragon paths and epic destinies.

The book also adds two player races, Drow and Genasi (humanoid embodiments of the Elemental Chaos), and three player classes:

- the Swordmage, an eladrin "style of fighting that uses spells to increase the character's skill with the blade",
- "the Dark Pact Warlock, a drow sendup of the Warlock class found in the Player's Handbook",
- and the Spellscarred, victims of the Spellplague who "can channel the power infused in them. Most of their powers involve rather nasty arcane fire spells".

== Publication history ==
The Forgotten Realms Player's Guide was written by Greg Bilsland, Logan Bonner, Eric L. Boyd, Rob Heinsoo, and Robert J. Schwalb, and published in 2008. The book features art by Matt Cavotta, Miguel Coimbra, Brian "Chippy" Dugan, Jesper Ejsing, Wayne England, Lucio Giordani, Soe Hemmi, Goran Josic, Rob Lazzaretti, Howard Lyon, Warren Mahy, Breanne Miller, William O'Connor, Ryan Sansaver, Mike Sass, Mike Schley, Emi Tanji, Francis Tsai, and Eva Widermann.

Shannon Appelcline commented that with Fourth Edition Dungeons & Dragons, Wizards of the Coast intended to publish only three books for each campaign setting, and after that move on to a new setting the following year: "The Forgotten Realms Campaign Guide (2008), the Forgotten Realms Player's Guide (2008) and FR1: Scepter Tower of Spellgard (2008) kicked off the cycle... and were some of Wizards' worst-received supplements ever. This was largely because Wizards had decided to destroy the old Forgotten Realms to make it fit into their ideas of a 'points of light' setting. Old gods and NPCs were gone, kingdoms had fallen, the timeline was dramatically advanced and the Realms lay in ruins. From the scathing reviews that the new setting books got, it seems likely that they did as much to alienate existing fans from fourth-edition play as the core rulebooks had."

== Reception ==
Wired commented that "Put simply, if you're playing a character in the 4E version of the Realms, you need this book. [...] My favorite section of the book is called Backgrounds. It describes the most important regions and cities of the game world, fine-tuned for players' needs: you're given sample character archetypes ('Hunter of Monsters' or 'Enigmatic Vigilante') that would be particularly appropriate for the region, as well as enough background that even a raw newbie would be able to play the role convincingly. [...] There's a lot the Forgotten Realms Player's Guide misses, but it's for players rather than DMs. Necessarily limited by keeping certain info out of PCs' hands, the book does a great job at presenting what they need".
