= Divine Power =

2009 role-playing game supplement

- Subject: Role-playing games
- Genre: Dungeons & Dragons
- Publisher: Wizards of the Coast
- Publication date: 2009
- Media type: Trade hardcover

Divine Power is a supplement for the 4th edition of the Dungeons & Dragons fantasy role-playing game.

== Contents ==
Divine Power contains additional options and rules for clerics, paladins, and other divine classes.

== Publication history ==
Shannon Appelcline commented that the initial product line for Fourth Edition Dungeons & Dragons was "a set of 'power' books that offered new options for players, organized by the power sources of 4E. Martial Power (2008), Arcane Power (2009), Divine Power (2009), and Martial Power 2 (2010) all focusing on 'standard' power sources; Primal Power (2009) and Psionic Power (2010) focused on more esoteric power sources, each of which was introduced in the Player's Handbook published earlier the same year."

Divine Power was written by Rob Heinsoo, Richard Baker, Logan Bonner, and Robert J. Schwalb, and published by Wizards of the Coast in 2009.

== Reception ==
Divine Power reached No. 10 on The Wall Street Journal's non-fiction bestseller list the week of July 30, 2009.

Viktor Coble listed the entire Power series - including Martial Power, Martial Power 2, Divine Power, Arcane Power, Psionic Power, and Primal Power - as #2 on CBR's 2021 "D&D: 10 Best Supplemental Handbooks" list, stating that "What sets the power series apart – besides their updated rules – is how they translate really well to 5e. Whereas, the "Complete" series needs a little more work. The rules have both been pared down and expanded upon in this guide, which makes picking up a copy for whatever type of character is most in favor worth it."
