= The Caverns of Thracia =

1979 fantasy role-playing adventure

- Authors: Jennell Jaquays (Note: Credited as Paul Jaquays.)
- First published: 1979

The Caverns of Thracia is an adventure for fantasy role-playing games published by Judges Guild in 1979. Written by Jennell Jaquays, it was compatible with the original 1974 edition of Dungeons & Dragons.

== Contents ==
The Caverns of Thracia is an adventure scenario with a background based on Greek mythology which details a dungeon complex as well as a lost city. The upper levels of the dungeon are intended for low-level player character, while the lower levels are more challenging for higher level characters.

The Caverns of Thracia is an adventure for player characters of levels 2 through 6 involving a series of rooms and caverns that have been inhabited by many previous occupants. Many years ago lizard men used them as a religious center until they were defeated by human worshippers of the death god Thanatos. Their beast men slaves (including creatures such as gnolls, minotaurs, and dog brothers) rebelled and took over the caverns, and the descendents of the intelligent minotaur they chose for their leader still reign over beast men. The minotaur king controls all the caverns, except for a small portion of the first level that the worshippers of Thanatos have held on to.

The Caverns of Thracia is a very large adventure setting with significant historical background detail provided in the text.

== Publication history ==
The Caverns of Thracia was written by Jennell Jaquays and published by Judges Guild in 1979 as an 80-page book. Jaquays later related, "I was mostly freestyling. I let the project decide what it would become and how low it would be. Judges Guild also never really edited anything. The author's words went straight to typesetting. What you see in the printed works is pretty close to the prose I submitted to them."

Clark Peterson of Necromancer Games ran an adventure titled "Return to the Caverns of Thracia" that was based on the old adventure, as a Gen Con tournament adventure in 2002, and Necromancer released a revised Caverns of Thracia in 2004, updated for 3.5 edition, but did not release any other licensed publications before their license with Judges Guild lapsed.

A revised edition—compatible with Dungeons & Dragons 3.5 edition—was published in 2004. In 2025 Goodman Games published heavily extended conversions for DnD 5E and their in-house Dungeon Crawl Classics-Ruleset including the original Adventure.

== Reception ==
Don Turnbull reviewed The Caverns of Thracia for White Dwarf #17 and rated it an 8 out of 10. He commented that "There are a few errors [...] and some cumbersome elements [...] but on the whole this is a thorough piece of work." Turnbull concluded his review by commenting on Judges Guild adventures in general: "Inevitably, there remains the comparison with the TSR Modules, and I am bound to say that none of the Judges Guild products I have met so far hang together quite as well as the TSR Modules. There is a feeling of randomness about Caverns of Thracia, Dark Tower and the others which is not present in the TSR Modules, and one gets the impression that the coherence is incomplete. The TSR productions should be regarded, not as an unattainable height, but as a target of quality which should be equaled or even surpassed. That the two designs by [Jennell] Jaquays come closest in quality to the TSR standard is reassuring, since it seems that at least [Jennell] is making the effort."

Steve Cook reviewed The Caverns of Thracia in The Space Gamer No. 29. Cook commented that "A strong point of the game is its flexibility and variety. There are monsters that any low-level character could successfully tackle, but others will make even the bravest run. The fact that there are two opposing sides in the caverns opens up the possibility of the players allying themselves with one of the sides." He continues: "The major problem of this game is that there are too many monsters. It seems you can't go ten feet without being jumped by gnolls, minotaurs, or other nasties. Another problem is that monsters which could be surprises aren't. Skeletons, dead bodies, statues, etc., are animated nearly every time." Cook concluded his review by saying, "Overall, the good points greatly outweigh the bad. My player's reactions have been very positive toward this dungeon. If you want an exciting adventure for D&D, then The Caverns of Thracia is for you."

Patrick Amory reviewed Caverns of Thracia for Different Worlds magazine and stated that "this D&D dungeon is an example of Judges Guild at their best. Well thought out and entertaining, based on Greek mythology, the Caverns will provide hours of full play. This package is probably near to being the best D&D play-aid on the market."

Since then, The Caverns of Thracia has come to be regarded as one of the classics of the genre, particularly within the Old School Renaissance community. Within this community, creating a dungeon that matches the amount of flexibility presented to the players in terms of available exploration paths and interactive factions has become known as "Jaquaysing" a dungeon (a term coined by Justin Alexander of The Alexandrian blog). James Maliszewski of Grognardia called it "a good example of why Judges Guild is remembered so fondly by so many of us who started gaming in the 70s."

In his 2023 book Monsters, Aliens, and Holes in the Ground, RPG historian Stu Horvath noted, "Along with Snakepipe Hollow (1979) and The Keep on the Borderlands (1979), The Caverns of Thracia share a set of surprisingly similar characteristics, and they represent a kind of culmination of adventure design in the '70s ... Jaquays's intricate, non-linear spaces are the ideal venue for players to star in stories of their own making."

== Reviews ==
- Different Worlds #6 (Dec 1979)
