= Anauroch: The Empire of Shade =

Dungeons & Dragons adventure module

- Rules required: Dungeons & Dragons, 3.5 edition
- Character levels: 13th-17th
- Authors: Greg A. Vaughan, Thomas M. Reid, and Skip Williams
- First published: November 2007
- ISBN: 978-0786943623

Anauroch: The Empire of Shade is an adventure module for the 3.5 edition of the Dungeons & Dragons fantasy role-playing game.

== Plot summary ==
Anauroch: The Empire of Shade takes place in the Forgotten Realms setting, where malign forces conspire to undo the Weave and replace it with the Shadow Weave, causing the Great Desert of Anauroch to change. The player characters must intervene or else all of Faerun will soon feel the dark might of the greatest magical empire since Netheril.

== Publication history ==
Anauroch: The Empire of Shade was published in November 2007, with cover art by William O'Connor and interior art by Eric Deschamps, Randy Gallegos, Fred Hooper, Monte Michael Moore, William O'Connor, and Francis Tsai. Though the book is credited to Greg A. Vaughan, Thomas M. Reid, and Sean K. Reynolds on the front cover, Sean K. Reynolds was not actually involved in the project. The third author was, instead, Skip Williams and is properly credited on the book's title page and on the credits page.

== Reception ==
Martin Drury of RPGamer wrote that the adventure "[...] just does not live up to expectations. [...] Despite a few bright spots, Anauroch: The Empire of Shade falls short of sending Wizards of the Coast's 3.5 Edition publishing days out with a bang. Game Masters and players who participated in the first two adventures of the trilogy will probably want to play through it out of necessity, but anyone looking for a stand-alone adventure would be best served looking elsewhere."

In a review of Anauroch: The Empire of Shade in Black Gate, John ONeill said "Anauroch is an adventure for characters of level 9-13, which means that if your player characters start with Cormyr (recommended for characters of level 4-7), you can expect the entire 3-part supermodule to bring your players from level 4 all the way to 13… pretty impressive."
