= Complete Scoundrel =

Dungeons & Dragons rulebook

- Author: Mike McArtor and F. Wesley Schneider
- Genre: Role-playing game
- Publisher: Wizards of the Coast
- Publication date: January 2007
- Media type: Print (Hardback)
- Pages: 160
- ISBN: 978-0-7869-4152-0

Complete Scoundrel: A Player's Guide to Trickery and Ingenuity is a supplemental rule book for the 3.5 edition of the Dungeons & Dragons role-playing game.

== Contents ==
The book provides feats, prestige classes, and other options for characters interested in playing trickster characters. It has introduced the idea of Skill tricks, which are feat-like character moves that cost skill points to learn and may only be used once per encounter.

The Prestige Classes in this book are the: Avenging Executioner, Battle Trickster, Cloaked Dancer, Combat Trapsmith, Fortunes's Friend, Gray Guard, Magical Trickster, Malconvoker, Master Of Masks, Mountebank, Psibond Agent, Spellwarp Sniper, and the Uncanny Trickster.

Some of the feats in this book have been specialized for the Sneak attack. There are also Luck feats, which give the character a reroll on certain actions in order to get a better result. There are also Bardic Music feats, which give the bard the option to use up one of his daily bard performance in order to gain specific effects.

== Publication history ==
Complete Scoundrel was written by Mike McArtor and F. Wesley Schneider, and published in January 2007. Cover art is by William O'Connor, and interior art is by David Bircham, Miguel Coimbra, Ed Cox, Eric Deschamps, Carl Frank, Randy Gallegos, Howard Lyon, Warren Mahy, Michael Phillippi, Franz Vohwinkel, Eva Widermann, and Kieran Yanner.

Mike McArtor explained whether the book was aimed at just the rogue class, or to characters in general: "The book takes a broader aim for the most part, allowing all classes the chance to act a little scoundrelly from time to time (yes, even paladins!). That said, however, we did not forget the original D&D scoundrels, so we have some support specifically for rogues (and bards, ninjas, scouts, and spellthieves, as well)."

== Reviews ==
- Dragão Brasil
