= Power of Faerûn =

2006 role-playing game supplement

- Genre: Role-playing game
- Publisher: Wizards of the Coast
- Publication date: March 2006
- Media type: Print
- ISBN: 0-7869-3910-9

Power of Faerûn is a supplement to the 3.5 edition of the Dungeons & Dragons role-playing game.

== Contents ==
Power of Faerûn is an accessory for the Forgotten Realms that provides players with suggested tactics and descriptions.of possible pitfalls and opportunities for guiding their player characters to dominance in a campaign set in Faerûn. The book includes adventure ideas and guidelines for detailing ruling courts and other institutions and power groups, as well as handling political struggles, crises, and daily situations in play.

== Publication history ==
Power of Faerûn was written by Ed Greenwood and Eric L. Boyd, and published in March 2006. The cover art was by Lucio Parrillo, with interior art by Daarken, Eric Deschamps, Rick Drennan, Ron Lemen, Warren Mahy, William O'Connor, Lucio Parrillo, Francis Tsai, and Franz Vohwinkel.

Ed Greenwood explained that his motivation for working on this book involved "the chance to delve into some of the hitherto-neglected facets of running high-level campaigns, including trade, intrigue, and social matters, and the opportunity to tackle the project alongside Eric L. Boyd, who's a great friend, superb 3.5e designer, and top-notch Realms expert".
