= Campaign Sourcebook and Catacomb Guide =

1990 role-playing game accessory

- Author: Jennell Jaquays (Note: Credited as Paul Jaquays.) and William W. Connors
- Genre: Role-playing game
- Publisher: TSR
- Publication date: 1990
- Pages: 128
- ISBN: 978-0-88038-817-7

Campaign Sourcebook and Catacomb Guide is an accessory for the Advanced Dungeons & Dragons fantasy role-playing game.

== Contents ==
The Campaign Sourcebook and Catacomb Guide is a supplement to the Dungeon Master's Guide for the Advanced Dungeons & Dragons 2nd edition rules. The first section of the book contains guidelines to help Dungeon Masters (DMs) run campaigns, while the second part of the book details how to run games in dungeons.

== Publication history ==
DMGR1 Campaign Sourcebook and Catacomb Guide was written by Jennell Jaquays and William W. Connors, and published by TSR in 1990 as a 128-page book. Editing was done by William W. Connors and Warren Spector.

== Reception ==
In the July 1990 edition of Games International (Issue 16), the reviewer called this product "a collection of sound advice on how to run a campaign that is leagues ahead of the usual AD&D fare."

Ken Rolston reviewed the Campaign Sourcebook and Catacomb Guide for Dragon magazine in July 1991. He gave the book a very positive review, noting in particular the high quality of the details on mapping, the tips for using props and for creating and presenting vivid NPCs, and the simple guidelines for world building. He found the chapter rationalizing the existence of dungeons "marginally persuasive and thoroughly entertaining", and felt the book addresses all the questions he had heard from "earnest, troubled young DMs at convention seminars". He described the writing as "simple, lean, and humorous [...] full of veteran wisdom, play experience, and practical insight into gamer behavior". He found it odd there had never been a good book on game mastering before, noting the book reminded him of many principles and tricks he had learned through "hard experience and obsessive study of other DMs' styles and cheap tricks". He concluded the review by addressing DMs: "Beginners: You want this solid introductory reference for its ironic, practical, and amusing advice on creating, organizing, and presenting role-playing adventures and campaigns. Veterans: Enjoy this readable, amusing review of the basic problems and approaches to being an effective DM."

== Reviews ==
- Casus Belli #63
