= Secret Identities: The Asian American Superhero Anthology =

Comic book anthology

- Date: April 2009
- Page count: 200 pages
- Publisher: The New Press

Creative team
- Writers: Various
- Artists: Various

Original publication
- Language: English
- ISBN: 978-1-59558-398-7

Secret Identities: The Asian American Superhero Anthology is a comics anthology edited by Jeff Yang, Parry Shen, Keith Chow, and Jerry Ma that brings together leading Asian American creators in the comics industry—including Gene Yang (National Book Award finalist for American Born Chinese), Bernard Chang (Wonder Woman), Greg Pak (Hulk), and Christine Norrie (Black Canary Wedding Special)—to craft original graphical short stories set in a compelling "shadow history" of our country: from the building of the railroads to the Japanese American internment, the Vietnam airlift, the murder of Vincent Chin, and the incarceration of Wen Ho Lee.

In October 2010, the editors announced they had begun work on a second anthology entitled Secret Identities Volume 2: Shattered. Production on Volume 2 was due in part to a grant from The Vilcek Foundation. Shattered was released in November 2012.

== Promotion ==
Creators Larry Hama, Christine Norrie, Jef Castro, Keith Chow, Cliff Chiang and Jerry Ma, who all contributed work to Secret Identities, appeared at a book signing at Midtown Comics Times Square in Manhattan, on May 23, 2009 to promote the book.

== Contributors ==
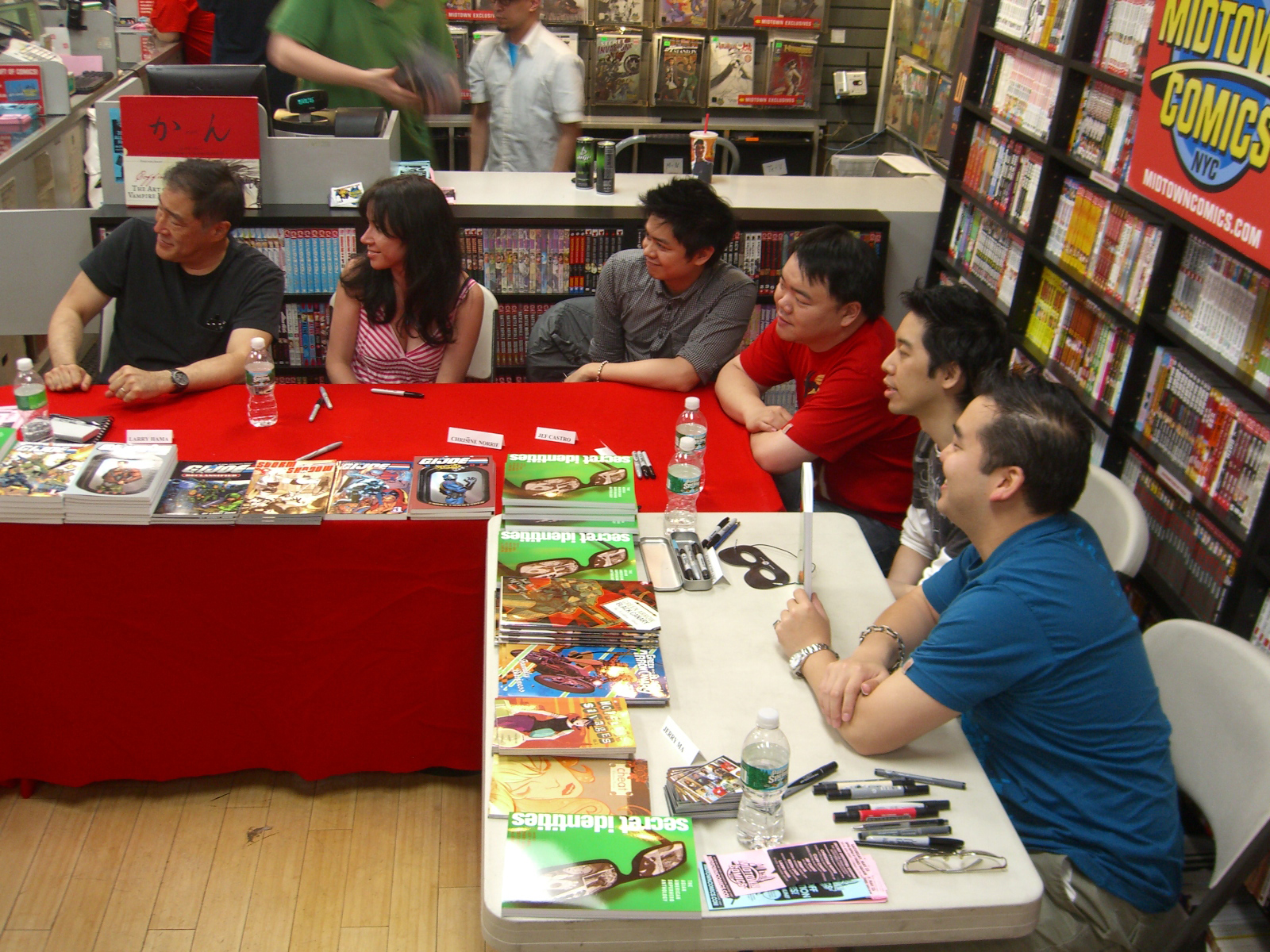
Creators (clockwise from upper left) Larry Hama, Christine Norrie, Jef Castro, Keith Chow, Cliff Chiang and Jerry Ma at a signing for Secret Identities at Midtown Comics Times Square in Manhattan, May 23, 2009.

- A.L. Baroza
- Alex Joon Kim
- Alex Tarampi
- Alexander Shen
- Anthony Tan
- Anthony Wu
- Anuj Shrestha
- Benton Jew
- Bernard Chang
- Billy Tan
- Chi-Yun Lau
- Christine Norrie
- Clarence Coo
- Cliff Chiang
- Daniel Jai Lee
- Deodato Pangandoyon
- Dustin Nguyen
- Erwin Haya
- Francis Tsai
- Gene Yang
- Glenn Urieta
- Greg LaRocque
- Greg Pak
- Hellen Jo
- Ian Kim
- Jamie Ford
- Jason Sperber
- Jef Castro
- Jeff Yang
- Jeremy Arambulo
- Jerry Ma
- Jimmy Aquino
- Johann Choi
- John Franzese
- John Kuramoto
- Jonathan Tsuei
- Kazu Kibuishi
- Keiko Agena
- Keith Chow
- Kelly Hu
- Ken Wong
- Koji Steven Sakai
- Kripa Joshi
- Larry Hama
- Leonardo Nam
- Lynn Chen
- Martin Hsu
- Michael Kang
- Ming Doyle
- Naeem Mohaimen
- Nick Huang
- Parry Shen
- Paul Wei
- Raymond Sohn
- Sarah Sapang
- Sonny Liew
- Sung Kang
- Tak Toyoshima
- Tanuj Chopra
- Ted Chung
- Tiffanie Hwang
- Vince Sunico
- Walden Wong
- Yul Kwon
