= Central Casting: Heroes of Legend =

Role-playing game supplement

Central Casting: Heroes of Legend is a fantasy role-playing game supplement first published in 1988 by Task Force Games, with a second edition published in 1995.

== Contents ==
Central Casting: Heroes of Legend is a supplement which includes a system to allow players to generate a detailed heritage and origin story for their player characters.

== Reception ==
Trenton Webb reviewed the 2nd edition of Central Casting: Heroes of Legend for Arcane magazine, rating it a 7 out of 10 overall. Webb comments that "Heroes Of Legend fleshes out characters and offers those odd foibles that make roleplaying rewarding - a dragon shaped birthmark on the buttocks anybody? The trick, if players will use the system, will be keeping player histories in check as the personality traits thrown up could easily overwhelm less skilful players."
