= Rappan Athuk: The Dungeon of Graves: The Upper Levels =

Role-playing game adventure by Necromancer Games

Rappan Athuk: The Dungeon of Graves: The Upper Levels is a 2001 role-playing game adventure published by Necromancer Games.

== Contents ==
Rappan Athuk: The Dungeon of Graves: The Upper Levels is an adventure in which a dungeon crawl explores six levels of a multi-level dungeon.

== Publication history ==
Shannon Appelcline noted that "Necromancer produced much more standard fare for the early d20 market - which is to say adventures. This started off with The Crucible of Freya (2000), the Rappan Athak mega-dungeon (2000) and Demons and Devils (2000)." Appelcline also noted that Fiery Dragon Productions interacted with other publishers, and "One of their early supplements offered some support for Necromancer Games' first Rappan Athuk adventure (2001)".

== Reviews ==
- Pyramid
- Backstab
- Campaign Magazine (Issue 1 - Aug/Sep 2001)
- Realms of Fantasy
