= Necromancer Games =

American role-playing game publisher

- Industry: Role-playing game
- Founded: 2000
- Defunct: c. 2010
- Fate: Currently active
- Headquarters: Seattle, Washington
- Key people: Clark Peterson and Bill Webb (founders)
- Products: d20 system licensed line

Necromancer Games was an American publisher of role-playing games. With offices in Seattle, Washington and Coeur d'Alene, Idaho, the company specialized in material for the d20 System. Most of its products were released under the Open Game License of Wizards of the Coast.

The company's slogan, "Third Edition Rules, First Edition Feel," alluded to the fact that while its products used the third edition of the Dungeons & Dragons rules system, they strove to mimic the flavor and style found in the game's first edition (1977–1989).

The company was on hiatus by 2010, the two founders having started two separate new game companies, Frog God Games and Legendary Games. In June 2012, Necromancer Games was acquired by Frog God Games.

The Necromancer Games logo features a depiction of Orcus.

== History ==
Necromancer Games was founded in 2000 by Clark Peterson and Bill Webb, the same year Wizards of the Coast released the third edition of the Dungeons & Dragons roleplaying game. The company partnered with several other gaming companies to release various products, including Judges Guild, Kenzer & Company, Malhavoc Press, Reaper Miniatures, Troll Lord Games, and White Wolf Publishing.

In August 2000, Necromancer Games released the first ever OGL/d20 product: The Wizard's Amulet. The adventure won an ENnie in 2001 for Best Free Product. In March 2007, it was announced that Paizo would be publishing Necromancer Games products, following the cessation of the deal with White Wolf Publishing.

Following the announcement of the impending fourth edition of Dungeons & Dragons in August 2007, Necromancer announced plans to support that edition with a variety of new products. However, neither any 4th edition nor any remaining 3rd edition products were ever released. While initially enthusiastic about 4th edition and the prospect of being able to publish third-party products for that game, in July 2008 company co-founder Clark Peterson declared the third-party license for fourth edition D&D "a total unmitigated failure". A 2010 statement by Peterson announced the company as "dormant for some time" and unlikely to revive.

Bill Webb went on to co-found Frog God Games, focusing on adventures designed for both the Pathfinder Roleplaying Game and Swords & Wizardry lines. Clark Peterson has since co-created Legendary Games focusing on plug-in material for Pathfinder Roleplaying Game adventure paths and sourcebooks. In June 2012, Necromancer Games was acquired by Frog God Games, which now offers older Necromancer products on its website.

In July 2014 a Kickstarter was launched by Frog God to fund a series of products for the then-upcoming 5th edition of Dungeons & Dragons, under the Necromancer Games label.

== "First Edition Feel" ==
Here is an excerpt from an interview done by Role-Play News in 2000 with Clark Peterson and Bill Webb about their view on what is the "First Edition Feel":

Clark Peterson: First Edition is the cover of the old DMG (Dungeon Masters Guide) with the City of Brass; it is Judges Guild; it is Type IV demons not Tanaari and Baatezu; it is the Vault of the Drow not Drizzt Do'urden; it is the Tomb of Horrors not the Ruins of Myth Drannor; it is orcs not ogrillons; it is mind flayers not Ilithids (or however they spell it); it is Tolkien, Moorcock, Howard and Leiber, not Eddings, Hickman, Jordan and Salvatore; it is definitely Orcus and the demon-princes and not the Blood War; it is Mordenkainen's Faithful Hound not Elminster's Evasion; and it is Artifacts and Relics from the old DMG (with all the cool descriptions).

I always say we want to be the VW Bug of roleplaying companies, meaning that we want to have a modern style and appeal but an obvious link to the past. One of the ways we do that is how we design the modules. For example, we use full color covers (not that funky mono-color of the old modules). But our modules have the same basic format of the old modules—inset art, module number in the upper left corner, diagonal band in the upper left corner, logo placement, etc. I guarantee you, when you look at one of our modules you will flash back to the old ones—just like when you see a new VW bug. And hopefully you will say "Man, that is just like an old module except cooler."

== Products ==
Necromancer Games released 57 third-edition-compatible products, alone and in partnership with other companies:

- Aberrations by Casey W. Christofferson
- Ancient Kingdoms: Mesopotamia by Morten Braten
- Bard's Gate by Casey W. Christofferson, Scott Greene and Shane Glodoski
- Bonegarden, The by Lance Hawvermale and Rob Mason
- Book of Taverns, The by Chris Jones
- Caverns of Thracia by James Collura, Bob Bledsaw based on material by Jennell Jaquays
- Chaos Rising by Jim Collura
- City of Brass by Casey W. Christofferson, Scott Greene, and Clark Peterson
- City State of the Invincible Overlord by Patrick Lawinger, Bob Bledsaw and Greg Geilman
- Coils of Set, The by Ryan Henry
- The Crucible of Freya by Clark Peterson and Bill Webb
- Crystal Skull, The by Dave Brohmann
- Dead Man's Chest by Lance Hawvermale, et al.
- Demons and Devils by Bill Webb and Clark Peterson
- Diamond Fortress, The by Phillip Larwood
- Doom of Listonshire, The by Ari Marmell
- Eldritch Sorcery by Patrick Lawinger, Scott Greene, David Mannes
- Elemental Moon by Lance Hawvermale and Andy Luke Crossness
- Family Affair, A by Carla Harker
- Fane of the Witch King by Steven Montano
- Feast of the Gobbler by Casey W. Christofferson
- Glades of Death by Patrick Lawinger, Jeff Harkness, and Gary Schotter
- Grey Citadel, The by Nathan Douglas Paul
- Hall of the Rainbow Mage by Patrick Lawinger
- Lamentation of Thieves, A by Lance Hawvermale
- Lost City of Barakus, The by W.D.B. Kenower and Bill Webb
- Maze of Zayene 1 : Prisoners of the Maze by Rob Kuntz
- Maze of Zayene 2 : Dimensions of Flight by Rob Kuntz
- Maze of Zayene 3 : Tower Chaos by Rob Kuntz
- Morrick Mansion by Patrick Lawinger
- Mother of All Encounter Tables, The by Greg Ragland, Bill Webb, Bob Bledsaw, and Greg Geilman
- Mother of All Treasure Tables, The by TableTop Adventures
- Necropolis by Gary Gygax
- Player's Guide to the Wilderlands by Bob Bledsaw, Greg Geilman, Clark Peterson, James Mishler, Rob Conley, Steve Stottrup, Steve Edwards and Patrick Lawinger
- Raise the Dead by Lance Hawvermale and Casey Christofferson
- Rappan Athuk 1 : The Dungeon of Graves by Bill Webb and Clark Peterson
- Rappan Athuk 2 : The Middle Levels by Bill Webb and Clark Peterson
- Rappan Athuk 3 : The Dungeon of Graves by Bill Webb, W.D.B. Kenower and Clark Peterson
- Rappan Athuk Reloaded by Bill Webb, Greg Ragland, W.D.B. Kenower and Clark Peterson
- Shades of Gray by Michael R. Proteau
- Siege of Durgam's Folly by Mike Mearls
- Set's Daughters by Jay Barnson
- Six Spheres of Zailhhessh, The by Luca Minutillo
- Tomb of Abysthor, The by Clark Peterson and Bill Webb
- Tome of Horrors by Scott Greene
- Tome of Horrors Revised by Scott Greene
- Tome of Horrors II by Scott Greene
- Tome of Horrors III by Necromancer staff
- Tower of Jhedophar, The by Casey W. Christofferson
- Trouble at Durbenford by Robert J. Schwalb
- Vault of Larin Karr by W.D.B. Kenower
- Vampires and Liches by Casey W. Christofferson and Bill Webb
- Vindication! by Bob Sarvas
- What Evil Lurks by Lance Hawvermale
- Wilderlands of High Fantasy by Bob Bledsaw, Greg Geilman, Rob Conley, Steve Stottrup, Steve Edwards, Gabor Lux, James Mishler, Casey W. Christofferson, Clark Peterson, and Patrick Lawinger Based on Content from Judges Guild.
- Wizard's Amulet, The by Clark Peterson and Bill Webb
- Wurst of Grimtooth's Traps, The

== Role Playing Games Awards ==
Necromancer Games was recognized several times with Gen Con's ENnies award. The most notable award was the Gold Award in the category Best Adventure for Lost City of Barakus in 2004.

Tome of Horrors III won the Gold Award in the Category Best Adversary/ Monster Product at the 2006 Awards.

- ENnie Awards - 2001
  - Best Free Product : The Wizard's Amulet (Gold)
- ENnie Awards - 2003
  - Best Cartography : Necropolis by Gary Gygax (Silver)
  - Best Graphic Design & Layout : The Vault of Larin Karr (Silver)
  - Best Monster Supplement : Tome of Horrors (Gold)
  - Best Official Website : Necromancer Games (Gold)
- ENnie Awards - 2004
  - Best Adventure (d20) : Lost City of Barakus (Gold)
- ENnie Awards - 2005
  - Best Cartography : City State of the Invincible Overlord (Silver)
- ENnie Awards - 2006
  - Best Adversary/Monster Product : Tome of Horrors 3 (Gold)
  - Special Judges' Award: Grognard Award : Necromancer Games
