= Anthony Pryor =

American role-playing game designer

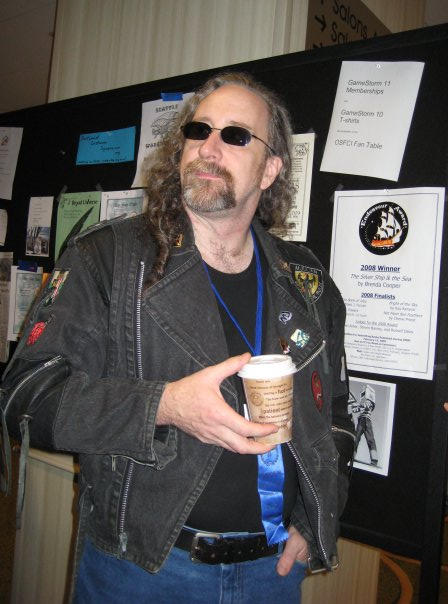
- Anthony Pryor
- Born: Anthony Pryor
- Occupation: Game designer
- Writing career
- Genre: Role-playing games

Anthony Pryor is the author and co-author of several roleplaying game products.

== Career ==
Anthony Pryor has worked as a game designer for Wizards of the Coast, Inc. His professional RPG credits include the 1992 Greyhawk setting modules Patriots of Ulek and Rary the Traitor, the 1992 books Dune Trader and Asticlian Gambit for Dark Sun, Creative Campaigning in 1992, the 1993 version of Lankhmar – City of Adventure, the 1994 "Marco Volo" module series (Marco Volo: Departure, Marco Volo: Journey, and Marco Volo: Arrival) and Spellbound boxed set (1995) for Forgotten Realms, The Rjurik Highlands (1996) for Birthright, and the third edition Drow of the Underdark (2007) with Ari Marmell, Robert J. Schwalb, and Greg A. Vaughan. He also wrote extensive!y for the Sword & Sorcery imprint of White Wolf Games, producing d20 System material in the Scarred Lands and Ravenloft settings.
