= Steve Argyle =

Fantasy artist

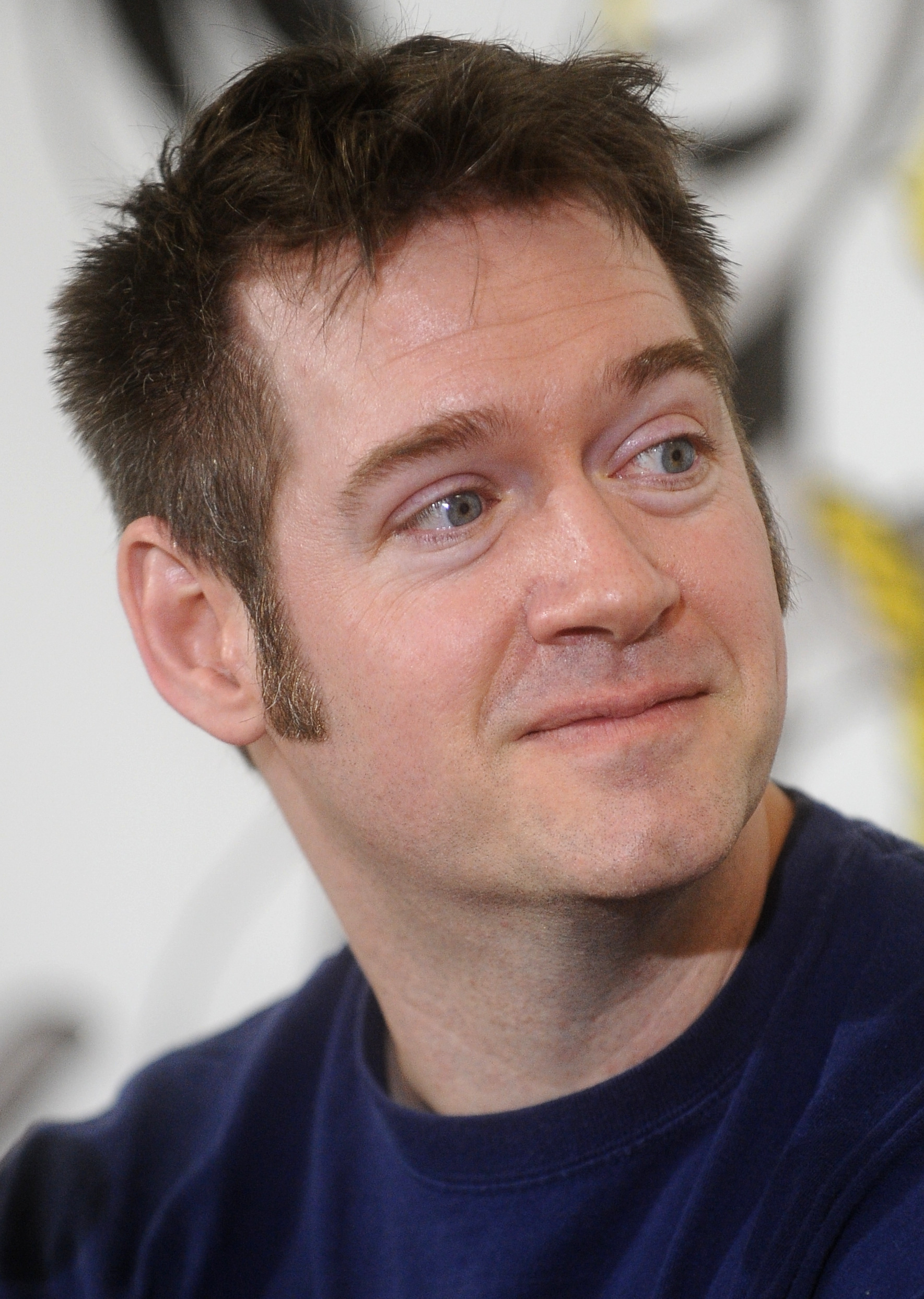
- Occupation: Illustrator
- Known for: Fantasy art, card game illustration
- Notable work: Magic: The Gathering; Dungeons & Dragons (3rd and 4th Edition); Legend of the Five Rings; The Frugal Wizard's Handbook for Surviving Medieval England
- Style: Digital painting, fantasy realism
- Website: steveargyle.com

Steve Argyle is an artist whose work has appeared in role-playing games, mainly Dungeons & Dragons.

== Career ==
Steve Argyle's Dungeons & Dragons work includes books such as Complete Champion (2007), the 4th edition Dungeon Master's Guide (2008) and Monster Manual (2008), Primal Power (2009), Player's Handbook 2 (2009), and Dungeon Master's Guide 2 (2009).

Argyle is also known for his work on the Magic: The Gathering collectible card game. He is also known for his work on Legend of the Five Rings.

Argyle was one of the artists to appear at the first-ever Salt Lake Comic Con in September 2013.

Argyle illustrated Brandon Sanderson's The Frugal Wizard's Handbook for Surviving Medieval England.
