= The Twilight Tomb =

Dungeons & Dragons adventure module

- Rules required: Dungeons & Dragons, 3.5 edition
- Character levels: 3rd
- Authors: Greg A. Vaughan
- First published: September 2006

The Twilight Tomb is an adventure module for the 3.5 edition of the Dungeons & Dragons fantasy role-playing game. The adventure takes place in the Forgotten Realms setting.

== Plot summary ==
The Twilight Tomb unfolds in Aglarond, a peninsula in the Inner Sea, and part of the Unapproachable East. It begins in the large forest of Yuirwood, where an oracle among its half-elf inhabitants foretells of the reemergence of the Duskwalker, an ancient and corrupt star elf wizard. Missing travelers and lost goods point the player characters to one of the circles of standing stones within the forest, which are known to allow for travel to another place.

== Publication history ==
The Twilight Tomb was published in September 2006, and was written by Greg A. Vaughan, with cover art by Jon Foster and interior art by Marvin Mariano and Steve Prescott.
