= Demons and Devils =

Demons and Devils is a 2001 role-playing game adventure published by Necromancer Games.

== Plot summary ==
Demons and Devils is an adventure in which three short dungeons adventures are compiled.

== Publication history ==
Shannon Appelcline noted that "Necromancer produced much more standard fare for the early d20 market - which is to say adventures. This started off with The Crucible of Freya (2000), the Rappan Athak mega-dungeon (2000) and Demons and Devils (2000)."

== Reviews ==
- Pyramid
- Backstab
- Campaign Magazine (Issue 1 - Aug/Sep 2001)
