= Dungeon Master's Guide =

Role-playing game rulebook

Dungeon Master's Guide (1979)
- Author: Gary Gygax
- Cover artist: David C. Sutherland III
- Subject: Advanced Dungeons & Dragons 1st Edition
- Genre: Role-playing game
- Publisher: TSR
- Publication date: 1979
- Pages: 238
- ISBN: 0-935696-02-4

The Dungeon Master's Guide (DMG or DM's Guide; in some printings, the Dungeon Masters Guide or Dungeon Master Guide) is a book of rules for the fantasy role-playing game Dungeons & Dragons. The Dungeon Master's Guide contains rules concerning the arbitration and administration of a game, and is intended for use by the game's Dungeon Master.

The Dungeon Master's Guide is a companion book to the Player's Handbook, which contains all of the basic rules of gameplay, and the Monster Manual, which is a reference book of statistics for various animals and monsters. The Player's Handbook, Dungeon Master's Guide, and Monster Manual are collectively referred to as the "core rules" of the Dungeons & Dragons game. Both the Dungeon Master's Guide and the Player's Handbook give advice, tips, and suggestions for various styles of play.

While all players, including the Dungeon Master, are expected to have at their disposal a copy of the Player's Handbook, only the Dungeon Master is expected to refer to the Dungeon Master's Guide or Monster Manual during gameplay.

== Advanced Dungeons & Dragons ==
The original AD&D Dungeon Masters Guide (sic) was published by TSR in August 1979. It was written by Gary Gygax and published as a 232-page hardcover with a cover by David C. Sutherland III. The book was intended to provide Dungeon Masters all the information and rules necessary to run a campaign for the D&D game. The 1983 printing featured a new cover by Jeff Easley.

Like other volumes of Dungeons & Dragons handbooks, the Dungeon Masters Guide has gone through several versions through the years. The original edition was written by Gary Gygax and edited by Mike Carr, who also wrote the foreword. The original cover art was by David C. Sutherland III, and interior illustrations were provided by Sutherland, D. A. Trampier, Darlene Pekul, Will McLean, David S. LaForce, and Erol Otus.

The first edition Dungeon Masters Guide covered the essential game rules for the Dungeon Master: creating and managing both player characters and non-player characters, directing combat, and handling adventures and campaigns that last multiple sessions. The book also included game statistics for magic items and treasure, details how to use random monster encounters, and provides statistics for some of the basic monsters and creatures of the game. New magic items were introduced.

The Dungeon Masters Guide contains scores of tables and charts for figuring damage and resolving encounters in a typical adventure, tables and rules for creating characters, and lists of the various abilities of the different classes of characters.

One supplement to the Guide was the Dungeon Masters Screen: two heavy-duty tri-fold boards with the most frequently used tables printed on them for easy reference. The 1979 second edition of the screen describes its purpose as "useful for shielding maps and other game materials from the players when placed upright, and also provide[s] instant reference to the charts and tables most commonly used during play." The Advanced Dungeons & Dragons Second Edition screen came packaged with a brief adventure; later editions of that screen, and screens produced for later editions, have instead included character sheets and general reference booklets.

A feature of the first edition Dungeon Masters Guide was the random dungeon generator. The generator allowed the Dungeon Master, by the rolling of dice, to generate a dungeon adventure "on the fly". A dungeon complete with passageways, rooms, treasure, monsters, and other encounters could easily and randomly be constructed as the player progressed. It could be used with several people or a single player. The generator was not included in subsequent editions of the Dungeon Master's Guide but made a re-appearance in the fifth edition Dungeon Master's Guide.

In 1999, a paperback reprint of the first edition was released.

The first edition Dungeon Masters Guide was reproduced as a premium reprint on July 17, 2012.

=== Reception ===
The original Dungeon Masters Guide was reviewed by Don Turnbull in issue #16 of the magazine White Dwarf (December 1979/January 1980). Turnbull commented mostly on the size of the book, "I would say that only the most severe critic could point at a minor omission, let alone a serious one."

Scott Taylor for Black Gate in 2014 listed both the 1st edition AD&D DMG re-cover and the 2nd Edition AD&D DMG both by Jeff Easley as #10 in The Top 10 TSR Cover Paintings of All Time.

Scott Taylor of Black Gate listed the Dungeon Master's Guide as #2 on the list of "Top 10 'Orange Spine' AD&D Hardcovers By Jeff Easley, saying "Not taking anything away from EVERYTHING THAT THE DM IS and how well Jeff represents it here, but I still believe when many folks think about an 'orange spine', they are going to remember #1 first, because at the end of the day, this [is] a re-cover, and half the folks out there are going to be about the Sutherland III edition."

In his 2023 book Monsters, Aliens, and Holes in the Ground, RPG historian Stu Horvath noted, "The Dungeon Master's Guide is strange and deeply idiosyncratic. Without a doubt, I believe it's also a masterpiece. Gygax expresses in it a singular vision that feels true in a way few other RPG books can ever hope to equal — it is an accidental portrait of the man's brain circa 1978."

== Advanced Dungeons & Dragons 2nd edition ==
Dungeon Master's Guide (1989)
- Author: David "Zeb" Cook
- Cover artist: Jeff Easley
- Subject: Advanced Dungeons & Dragons 2nd Edition
- Genre: Role-playing game
- Publisher: TSR
- Publication date: 1989
- Pages: 192
- ISBN: 0-88038-729-7

The AD&D 2nd Edition Dungeon Master Guide was released in 1989. This 192-page hardcover book was designed by David "Zeb" Cook, with cover art by Jeff Easley. The book featured interior illustrations by Easley, Clyde Caldwell, John and Laura Lakey, David Dorman, Douglas Chaffee, and Jean E. Martin.

This Dungeon Master's Guide featured revised second edition rules, reorganized and streamlined for the Dungeon Master. The book detailed options for character creation, handling the alignment rules, new rules for money and equipment, treasure and magical items, encounters, time and movement, and managing non-player characters. The book is indexed, and contains numerous full-page color illustrations.

The second edition Dungeon Master Guide is an ORIGINS and Gamer's Choice award-winner. In his 1991 book Heroic Worlds, Lawrence Schick commented that this book contained "lots of excellent new advice on how to run AD&D". A new version of the Dungeon Master Guide, with new art and layout but the same text, was released in 1995, as part of TSR's 25th anniversary.

Dungeon Master's Guide (1995)
- Author: David "Zeb" Cook, Steve Winter
- Cover artist: Jeff Easley
- Subject: Dungeons & Dragons 2nd Edition, Revised
- Genre: Role-playing game
- Publisher: TSR
- Publication date: 1995
- Pages: 256
- ISBN: 0-7869-0328-7

The 2nd edition Dungeon Master Guide was reproduced as a premium reprint on May 21, 2013.

=== Reception ===
Stephan Wieck reviewed the 2nd Edition Dungeon Master's Guide in White Wolf #17 (1989) and stated that "There are no great changes to the DMG, except that it has become as much a guide of advice for Dungeon Masters as a manual of specific information."

== Dungeons & Dragons 3rd edition ==
Dungeon Master's Guide (2000)
- Author: Monte Cook, Jonathan Tweet, Skip Williams
- Cover artist: Henry Higginbotham
- Subject: Dungeons & Dragons 3rd Edition
- Genre: Role-playing game
- Publisher: Wizards of the Coast
- Publication date: 2000
- Pages: 224
- ISBN: 0-7869-1551-X

The 3rd edition D&D Dungeon Master's Guide was published in September 2000.

Monte Cook, Jonathan Tweet, and Skip Williams all contributed to the 3rd edition Player's Handbook, Dungeon Master's Guide, and Monster Manual, and then each designer wrote one of the books based on those contributions. Cook is credited with the book's design. Cover art is by Henry Higginbotham, with interior art by Lars Grant-West, Scott Fischer, John Foster, Todd Lockwood, David Martin, Arnie Swekel, Kevin Walker, Sam Wood, and Wayne Reynolds. Dungeon Master's Guide was republished in 2001 as a slightly revised edition, correcting a few errors in the first edition.

Dungeon Master's Guide (2003)
- Author: David Noonan and Rich Redman
- Cover artist: Henry Higginbotham
- Subject: Dungeons & Dragons v3.5
- Genre: Role-playing game
- Publisher: Wizards of the Coast
- Publication date: July 2003
- Media type: Print (Hardback)
- Pages: 320
- ISBN: 0-7869-2889-1
- OCLC: 52691405
- LC Class: GV1469.62.D84 D836 2000
- Followed by: Dungeon Master's Guide II

In 2003, the Dungeon Master's Guide was revised for the 3.5 edition. David Noonan and Rich Redman are credited for the Dungeon Master's Guide 3.5 revision. Cover art is by Henry Higginbotham, with interior art by Matt Cavotta, Ed Cox, Lars Grant-West, Scott Fischer, John Foster, Jeremy Jarvis, John and Laura Lakey, Todd Lockwood, David Martin, Raven Mimura, Wayne Reynolds, Scott Roller, Brian Snoddy, Arnie Swekel, and Sam Wood.

When asked about the changes from the previous Dungeon Master's Guide, Rich Redman said:

I think the most immediate, obvious, and dramatic change is the reorganization. When the 3rd Edition books came out, the adventure game was supposed to teach you about D&D (including both playing and DMing) and the adventure path modules were supposed to help you learn more about DMing. That meant that the DMG could be, more or less, a catalogue or encyclopedia of rules information, a reference book for DMs. With the demise of the adventure game (which had stopped printing long before we started on 3.5), we needed to focus the 3.5 books much more on introducing the game to players. That meant reorganizing the DMG in particular. Several years of published books that referred to pages and chapters in the DMG meant we could only reorganize so much, but the copies I've seen stayed pretty close to the way I reorganized it.

The D&D Dungeon Master's Guide (v3.5) was reproduced as a premium reprint on September 18, 2012.

== Dungeons & Dragons 4th edition ==
Dungeon Master's Guide (2008)
- Author: James Wyatt, Wizards RPG Team
- Cover artist: Wayne Reynolds
- Subject: Dungeons & Dragons 4th Edition
- Genre: Role-playing game
- Publisher: Wizards of the Coast
- Publication date: June 2008
- Media type: Print (Hardback)
- Pages: 224
- ISBN: 978-0-7869-4880-2
- Followed by: Dungeon Master's Guide 2

The 4th edition D&D Dungeon Master's Guide was released on June 6, 2008, at the same time as its companion volumes. It is a 224-page hardcover written by James Wyatt. The front cover illustration was by Wayne Reynolds and the back cover illustration is by Brian Hagan, with interior illustrations by Rob Alexander, Steve Argyle, Wayne England, Jason Engle, David Griffith, Espen Grundetjern, Brian Hagan, Ralph Horsley, Howard Lyon, Lee Moyer, William O'Connor, Wayne Reynolds, Dan Scott, Ron Spears, Chris Stevens, Anne Stokes, and Eva Widermann. In addition to a comprehensive look at how to DM a 4th Edition campaign or adventure, it contains information on building encounters, aquatic and mounted combat, skill challenges, traps and hazards, rewards, NPC creation, artifacts, monster creation, and template, along with a sample town and short adventure so that DMs can start running their first 4th Edition adventure right away. Although it does contain artifacts, it is the first Dungeon Master's Guide not to contain standard magic items, which were moved into the Player's Handbook for 4th Edition.

Shannon Appelcline, author of Designers & Dragons, highlighted that the book introduced mechanical changes such as a "new style for adventure encounters" and a "skill challenge system" which were part of the key design philosophies of 4th edition. Appelcline wrote "besides revamping philosophies and rules, D&D 4e also revamped the game's standard world model and its cosmology" and "Wizards also introduced a new world setting that has become most popularly known as 'Nentir Vale' (though that just designates a small part of the world)".

In September 2009, the Dungeon Master's Guide 2 was released. It was written by James Wyatt, with Bill Slavicsek, Mike Mearls, and Robin D. Laws. Appelcline wrote "the original Dungeon Master's Guide had covered heroic adventuring (levels 1-10), so now the Dungeon Master's Guide 2 detailed paragon adventuring (levels 11-20). However, there is much more in the book too, including storytelling advice, skill challenge and monster customization, and the return of one of D&D's most beloved settings". The "fan-favorite setting of Sigil" was last revisited in depth in the Planescape Campaign Setting (1994) for the 2nd edition.

As part of the Essentials line of products, which were intended as an easy entry point for new players, Wizards of the Coast released a Dungeon Master's Kit (2010) that included a digest-sized book for the Dungeon Master containing much of the same material as the 4th edition Dungeon Master's Guide along with a two-part adventure module and a set of cardboard tokens for monsters.

== Dungeons & Dragons 5th edition ==
Dungeon Master's Guide (2014)
- Author: Mike Mearls, Jeremy Crawford, Christopher Perkins, James Wyatt
- Subject: Dungeons & Dragons 5th Edition, 2014 version
- Genre: Role-playing game
- Publisher: Wizards of the Coast
- Publication date: December 9, 2014
- Media type: Print (Hardback)
- Pages: 320
- ISBN: 978-0-7869-6562-5

The 5th edition Dungeons & Dragons Dungeon Master's Guide was released in 2014 as the last of three core rulebooks for the new edition. On the staggered release schedule, Jeremy Crawford wrote "our small team couldn't finish the books at the same time and also ensure their high quality. [...] We could either stagger their releases, or we could sit on the books until all three were finished". Crawford and Mike Mearls co-lead design for the Fifth Edition of Dungeons & Dragons. Polygon reported that the book "is by far the densest of the rulebooks yet released, but shares the same cover price — $50 in the US".

In an interview with Escapist Magazine, Mearls said:

Basic D&D hits core fantasy, it's stereotypical fantasy adventuring. If you're the DM and you want to do something more exotic, you say "I want to add technology to my game" or "I want to have more detailed rules for a grim and grittier game, more of a horror game." That's where the DMG comes in, it's for really fine-tuning your campaign, and creating a different type of experience than your standard fantasy campaign. It's also for expanding the scope of the game. [...] The DMG also has a lot of utilities in it, like for dungeon creation, adventure creation, creating monsters, creating spells, even if you wanted to create a character class. [...] So it's really for getting under the hood of how the system works and building up your campaign.

Dungeon Master's Guide (2024)
- Subject: Dungeons & Dragons 5th Edition, 2024 version
- Genre: Role-playing game
- Publisher: Wizards of the Coast
- Publication date: November 12, 2024
- Media type: Print (Hardback)

=== Reception ===
The book won the 2015 ENnie "Best Supplement" Gold award and the 2015 Origins "Best Role-Playing Game Supplement" and "Fan Favorite" awards.

Henry Glasheen, for SLUG Magazine, wrote "Fifth Edition, to my eyes, is the new gold standard for D20-based tabletop RPGs. It strips away the tedium of systems and statistics and replaces them with the true substance of role playing—deep, immersive stories. I've often found that the Dungeon Master's Guide was the most vestigial of all the D&D manuals, but Fifth Edition has elevated this previously tertiary book into something far more important and useful".

Jonathan Bolding, for Escapist Magazine, wrote "however, on finishing the book it's clear that while many critics - myself included - thought that this system would hinge on the DMG, the DMG just confirmed what we already knew D&D 5th Edition to be. This is a living history of D&D, a collection of what the game has been so far. Perfection, not innovation. Options, not prescriptions".

Chuck Francisco of mania.com commented: "Miles of treasure tables escort a wealth of random adventure tables to the ball, where they're resplendent in all of their easy session crafting majesty. The versatility of this tome is nowhere more obvious than amongst the flavor filled side panels, which further detail the lower magical level of the main setting, before explaining all of the variable options a DM has in bringing to life a world of their own."

In a review of Dungeon Master's Guide in Black Gate, Scott Taylor said "The 5E DMG devotes the first 127 pages to teaching a novice player how to [be] a Dungeon Master in this system. Where Gygax made the assumption that an aspiring DM needed to sit at a table as a player and learn the system from another, become inspired, and then extrapolate on what they'd learned firsthand, the folks [at] Wizards of the Coast have gone in the opposite direction and believe anyone buying this book has never really played D&D before and needs instruction on how to DM the game."
