= Drow of the Underdark =

Supplement for Dungeons & Dragons

The Drow of the Underdark
- Cover of 1991 edition, cover art by Jeff Easley
- Author: Ed Greenwood
- Publisher: TSR, Inc.
- Publication date: July 1991
- Media type: softcover
- Pages: 128
- ISBN: 1-56076-132-6

Drow of the Underdark is the name of two supplemental rules books for the Dungeons & Dragons fantasy role-playing game, providing supplementary game rules focusing on drow culture, equipment and folklore for both players and Dungeon Masters.

== Advanced Dungeons & Dragons 2nd edition ==
The Drow of the Underdark was written by Ed Greenwood for use with AD&D (2nd Ed.), and focuses primarily on the drow of the Forgotten Realms campaign setting. The book features cover art by Jeff Easley, and interior art by Tim Bradstreet and Rick Harris.

This book details the nature of dark elves, dark elven society, drow religion (including Eilistraee, Ghuanadar/The Elder Elemental God, Lolth, and Vhaeraun), the high history of the drow, drow spells, drow magical items, drow craftwork, drow languages, drow nomenclature, and dark elven runes. This book also details the Underdark of the Forgotten Realms, as well as several monsters of the Underdark (including the myrlochar and the yochlol).

== Dungeons & Dragons 3rd edition ==
Drow of the Underdark
- 2007 edition, cover art by Francis Tsai
- Author: Ari Marmell, Anthony Pryor, Robert J. Schwalb, & Greg A. Vaughan
- Publisher: Wizards of the Coast
- Publication date: May 2007
- Media type: hardcover
- Pages: 224
- ISBN: 978-0-7869-4151-3
- OCLC: 126839306
- LC Class: MLCM 2007/44945 (G)

Drow of the Underdark was written for use with D&D (3rd ed.), and is not tied to any specific campaign setting. The book's format and contents are similar to that of Draconomicon, Libris Mortis, and Lords of Madness.

Although primarily intended for DM use, players can use information from the book to play as a drow character or half-drow character, as well as to fight against drow, or to adventure in the Underdark in general.

This book was designed by Ari Marmell, Anthony Pryor, Robert J. Schwalb, and Greg A. Vaughan. It features cover art by Francis Tsai, and interior art by Steve Ellis, Wayne England, Lars Grant-West, Tomás Giorello, Jackoilrain, William O'Connor, Richard Sardinha, Beth Trott, Francis Tsai, Franz Vohwinkel, Eva Widermann, and James Zhang.

=== Contents ===
"All About Drow"

The first chapter contains general information about drow and contains few rules other than drow racial traits. A guide to drow names and their meanings is also included.

"Drow Options"

This chapter contains new uses for various skills, new feats (including general, metamagic, ambush, divine, vile, and weapon style feats), alternate class features for many classes, and new spells and invocations (some of which require the user to be a drow).

"Prestige Classes"

New prestige classes in this chapter include Arachnomancer, Cavestalker, Demonbinder, Dread Fang of Lolth Eye of Lolth, Insidious Corrupter, and Kinslayer. Each prestige class also contains a sample NPC ready for quick use.

"Drow Equipment"

This chapter contains new mundane, alchemical, and magic items, along with poisons, magic-infused poisons, and artifacts

"New Monsters and NPCs"

Numerous new monsters are presented in Drow of the Underdark, including the deep dragon, trolls, goblins, and draegloth. There are also numerous ready-to-use drow NPC statistics, both for "generic" NPCs (such as "drow slaver") and "specific" NPCs (like Xil'Etha Dhuvvaryl). Statistics for one monster, the vril, were accidentally left out of the book.

== Reception ==
In his 2023 book Monsters, Aliens, and Holes in the Ground, RPG historian Stu Horvath noted, "The idea that drow (except Drizzt) are irredeemably evil is fraught and represents one facet of a much larger problem in the treatment of race within the context of fantasy and science fiction — namely that race, which in the real world is a social construct, is made obviously and biologically real within the fiction."

== See also ==
- Plot and Poison: A Guidebook to Drow (2002, Green Ronin Publishing)
- Underdark (2003, Wizards of the Coast) supplement for the Forgotten Realms.
- Second Darkness (2008–2009, Paizo Publishing) an Adventure Path centered around drow.
