= Forgotten Realms Campaign Guide =

2008 role-playing game supplement

- Genre: Role-playing game
- Publisher: Wizards of the Coast
- Publication date: 2008
- Media type: Print
- ISBN: 978-0-7869-4924-3

The Forgotten Realms Campaign Guide is a supplement to the 4th edition of the Dungeons & Dragons role-playing game.

== Contents ==
The Forgotten Realms Campaign Guide includes everything a Dungeon Master needs to run a 4th edition D&D campaign in the Forgotten Realms setting, as well as elements that DMs can incorporate into their own D&D campaigns. The book provides background information on the lands of Faerûn, a fully detailed town in which to start a campaign, adventure seeds, new monsters, ready-to-play non-player characters, and a full-color poster map of Faerûn.

== Publication history ==
The Forgotten Realms Campaign Guide was written by Philip Athans, Bruce R. Cordell, Ed Greenwood, and Chris Sims, and published in 2008. The book features art by Drew Baker, Leon Cortez, Eric Deschamps, Steve Ellis, Randy Gallegos, Adam Gillespie, Michael Komarck, Robert Lazzaretti, Ron Lemen, Lee Moyer, William O'Connor, Mike Schley, Keven Smith, Emi Tanji, Mark Tedin, Francis Tsai, Matt Wilson, Sam Wood, Ben Wootten, Kieran Yanner, and James Zhang.

Shannon Appelcline commented that with Fourth Edition Dungeons & Dragons, Wizards of the Coast intended to publish only three books for each campaign setting, and after that move on to a new setting the following year: "The Forgotten Realms Campaign Guide (2008), the Forgotten Realms Player's Guide (2008) and FR1: Scepter Tower of Spellgard (2008) kicked off the cycle... and were some of Wizards' worst-received supplements ever. This was largely because Wizards had decided to destroy the old Forgotten Realms to make it fit into their ideas of a 'points of light' setting. Old gods and NPCs were gone, kingdoms had fallen, the timeline was dramatically advanced and the Realms lay in ruins. From the scathing reviews that the new setting books got, it seems likely that they did as much to alienate existing fans from fourth-edition play as the core rulebooks had."

== Reception ==
Wired commented that "Some readers complained that the book was too vague, but that seems reasonable to me – how could you thoroughly describe such a vast campaign setting in one book? Ultimately, the product succeeds at both entertaining old Forgotten Realms players while informing new ones."
