= Shadow of the Demon Lord =

Tabletop role-playing game

- Cover
- Designers: Robert J. Schwalb
- Publishers: Schwalb Entertainment, LLC
- Publication: 2015
- Genres: Horror fantasy
- Playing time: Varies
- Chance: Dice rolling
- Skills: Role-playing, improvisation
- Website: http://schwalbentertainment.com/shadow-of-the-demon-lord/

Shadow of the Demon Lord is a horror fantasy tabletop role-playing game (RPG) created by Robert J. Schwalb. It was funded through a Kickstarter campaign, and launched on March 12, 2015.

== Game ==
=== Setting ===
The game takes place in a world standing on the brink of the apocalypse. The cause is the Demon Lord, a boundless evil being of staggering power who authors the catastrophes blighting the landscape. Each new horror released reflects the Demon Lord's approach, the touch of its shadow, and its growing hunger for not only the planet but the entirety of all things. Although near, the Demon Lord remains outside the cosmos, rattling the cage of its prison as it strains to escape the Void to visit catastrophic destruction to the world.

The game provides several catastrophic templates which can be used to model how the world is falling apart. These templates represent the Shadow of the Demon Lord; wherever the Shadow falls, chaos and upheaval are born. The Shadow might let loose global pandemics, famines, droughts, earthquakes, demon princes to stomp across the countryside, living dead, and other world-spanning disasters and threats.

Alternatively, the game can also be played as a less perilous dark fantasy role-playing game.

=== Game mechanics ===
Shadow of the Demon Lord is played with two types of dice: a d20 and a d6. Instead of using a scaling set of numbers to model easier and harder tasks, the game uses banes and boons. For each positive circumstance that could help the player succeed, they have a boon. For each negative circumstance that might prevent their success, they have a bane. Banes and boons cancel each other out. When attempting to complete a task, for each bane or boon, the player rolls a d6 with their d20. Of the numbers rolled for boons, they add the highest number rolled to the number they rolled on the d20. Conversely, of all the numbers rolled for banes, they subtract the highest number rolled from the number they rolled on the d20.

==== Insanity and corruption ====
Characters may gain insanity when they see or experience something that strains the way they understand the world or something that harms them in a way that’s difficult to accept. Events which can inflict insanity include coming back from the dead, suffering a grievous wound, witnessing the brutal death of a loved one, or seeing a 30-foot tall demon waddle across the countryside as slime-covered, fleshy monstrosities spill from its countless drooling maws.

Shadow of the Demon Lord is an amoral game. There is no such thing as good or evil. Players can play their characters in whatever way makes sense for their individual stories. But some actions have lasting consequences. Murder in cold blood, torturing an innocent, or learning Black Magic or Demonology spells can leave stains on the character’s soul. Corruption is a control mechanism intended to curb these excesses. It measures the degree to which a character’s soul is stained. Accumulating corruption points causes interesting developments. Examples: a character with a handful of corruption points might cause children in their presence to cry, animals to attack, food to spoil, and shadows to writhe. One effect from the Black Magic tradition states that if a character learns too many Black Magic spells they might become so corrupted that once a week a child within 8 miles of them will die.

=== Character creation and advancement ===
Each player except the game master controls one game character. Typical games involve several characters gathering in a group. At the beginning of the game each player creates a 0 level character who does not yet realize that a greater destiny awaits them. These characters are completely new to adventuring and have not yet met the other characters that will form their group.

The creation of a character includes selecting their Ancestry, which is a feature similar to race or species (elves, dwarves, humans, etc.) in traditional fantasy RPGs. Ancestries include some game unique options, such as the Jotun, "a hulking albino humanoid with the blood of giants flowing through her veins" and the Clockwork, "a person made from cogs, springs, and gears." Players write down their characters' data in character sheets, which contain the information provided by the character's Ancestry. Character creation typically takes between 5 and 10 minutes.

Character advancement is based on a path system. Once the group completes their first story (or adventure), they are ready to take the next step on their path to greatness by choosing a Novice path. Typically this choice is made based on things they accomplished during the first story. If a character spent time fighting hand to hand they may choose to become a warrior. If they found a tome of ancient magics they may choose to be a magician. After completing a few more each player chooses a more specialized Expert path; some options include Cleric, Druid, Oracle, Thief, and Warlock. After completing several more stories each player chooses an even more specialized Master path. Some of the Master path choices include "sharpshooter, shapeshifter, dervish, gunslinger, or something else that describes the area where your character focuses their training." Characters continue to unlock new benefits and abilities from their earlier paths as they advance to later paths. With each choice the characters become more powerful and complex.

== Press news ==
On October 25, 2014, Schwalb announced the creation of a new company, Schwalb Entertainment, and the creation of a new role-playing game entitled Shadow of the Demon Lord. The press release described the game as mixing horror and fantasy elements.

The game has been previewed at several small conventions, with a large playtest at the Winter Fantasy convention in January 2015. A Kickstarter is planned for the Spring of 2015, with a potential publishing date in the Fall of 2015. The Schwalb Entertainment web site has provided several previews of the game's underpinnings, including systems for magic, combat, and initiative.

Schwalb discussed the game in an interview on the German site Obskures.de, on the Obsidian Portal blog Words in the Dark, in episode 73 of the Table Topics podcast, and in an interview with Skullbanger Media.

Michael Long of Tribality posted several articles about the game on the Tribality Game News and Review Web site on March 12, 2015, April 8, 2015, and August 27, 2015.
