= Carlo Bocchio =

Italian illustrator and comic book artist

Carlo Bocchio, also known as JackOilRain (born March 25, 1974), is an Italian illustrator and comic book artist (Heavy Metal).

His style was strongly influenced by Simon Bisley, Justin Sweet, and by costume designer Bob Ringwood.

His paintings have been published in the World of Warcraft role-playing game and on collectible card games such as A Game of Thrones, Call of Cthulhu, Runebound (Fantasy Flight Games), Wizards of the Coast's Dungeons & Dragons (including interior art on Drow of the Underdark) and Nephandum/Creatures of terror, Empyrea (Asterion Press for role-playing games), and now works for Mongoose Publishing.
