= Christine Norrie =

Comic book artist

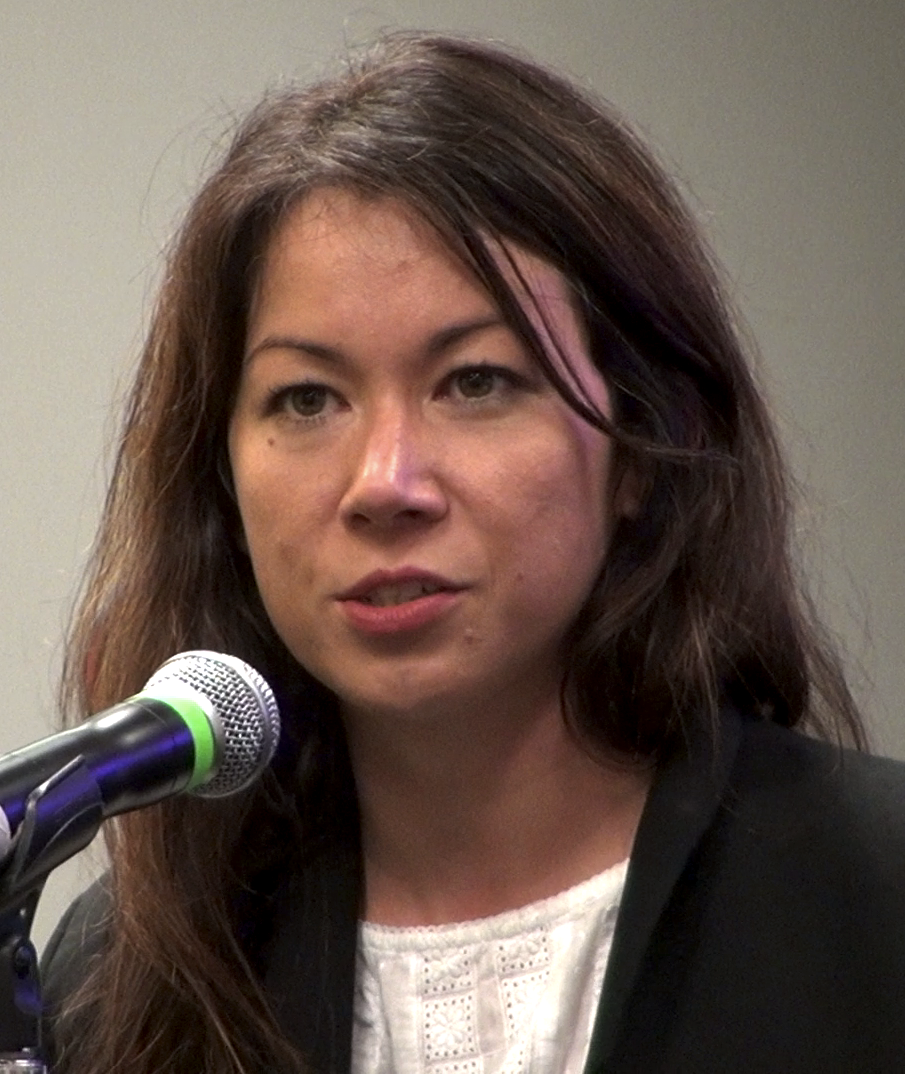
- Norrie at NYU in September 2011
- Area: Artist
- Notable works: Cheat, Secret Identities

Christine Norrie is a comic book artist, known for her work on the graphic novel Cheat. Norrie has also worked extensively as an artist and inker on various comic books, including a syndicated comic series that accompanied the first three movies of the Spy Kids franchise for the Disney Adventures and Disney's Comic magazines, and various Oni Press publications, including art for Hopeless Savages and inks for Queen & Country. In December 2006, Scholastic's Graphic Novel imprint, Graphix, released the latest work by Norrie, the 192-page Breaking Up, with New York Times best-selling author, Aimee Friedman.

Her 2009 work includes Secret Identities, which describes itself as "The Asian American superhero anthology".

== Bibliography ==
- Hopeless Savages, 2001–2004
- Queen & Country: Vol. 2: Operation: Morningstar, 2002
- Cheat, 2003
- Grosse Pointe Girl: Tales from a Suburban Adolescence, 2004
- Fashion High: Breaking Up, 2007
- Black Canary Wedding Special #1, 2007
- American Virgin, Volume 3: Wet, 2007
- Lumberjanes: 2016 Special: Makin' the Ghost of It, 2016
- Lumberjanes: Bonus Tracks, 2018
