= Aimee Friedman =

American novelist

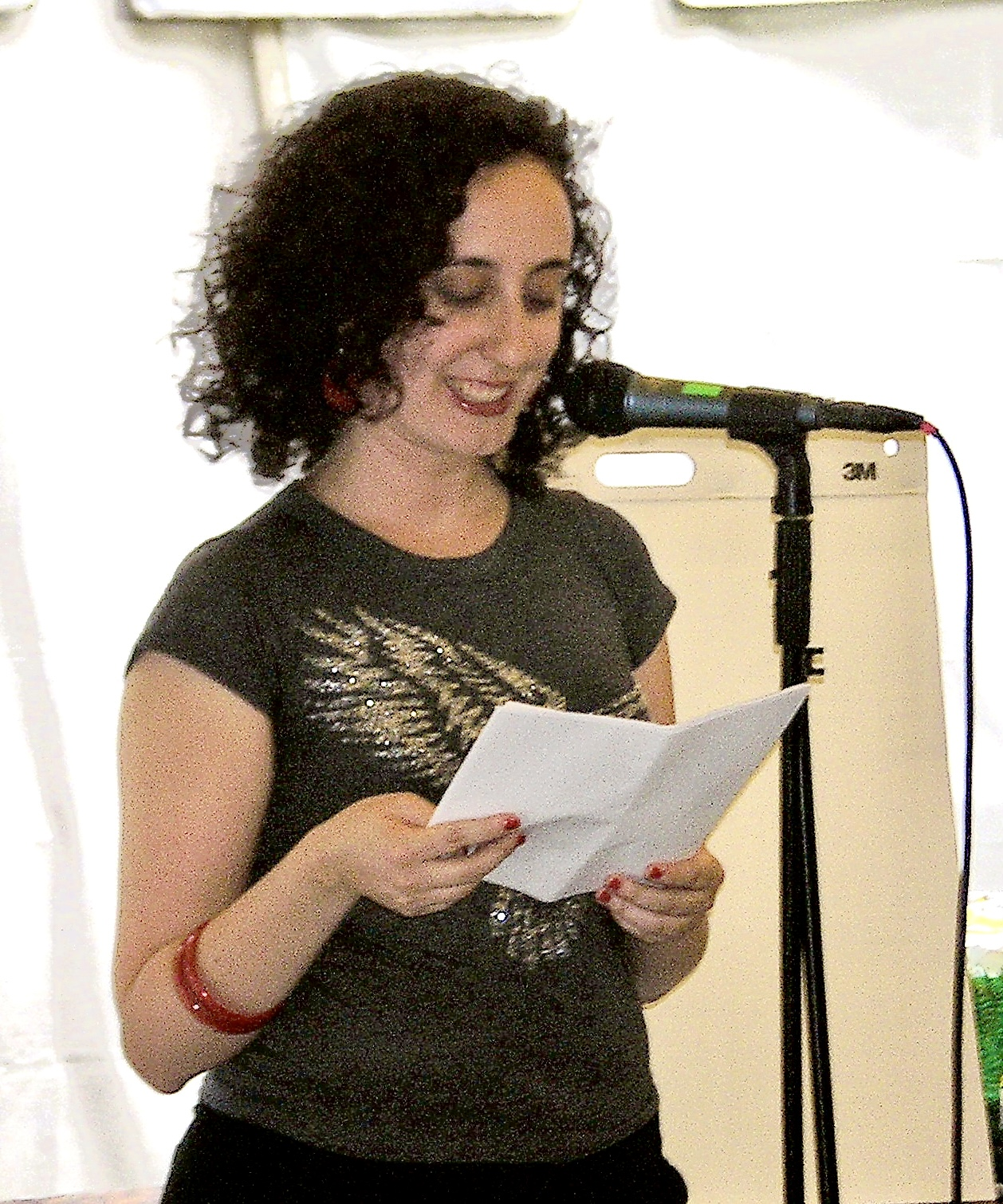
- Aimee Friedman in 2006
- Born: 1979 (age 45–46); New York City, U.S.
- Education: Bronx High School of Science; Vassar College (AB)
- Occupation: Author

Aimee Friedman (born 1979) is the author of several young adult novels published by Scholastic Inc., Point and S&S. Her novels South Beach (2004) (a New York Times bestseller), French Kiss (2005), Hollywood Hills (2007) and The Year My Sister Got Lucky (2008) focus on the scandalous adventures of on-again, off-again best friends Holly Jacobson and Alexa St. Laurent. Friedman released Sea Change on June 1, 2009. A Novel Idea (2005) is a romantic comedy about a teenager who starts a book club in Park Slope, Brooklyn. Friedman wrote one of the four stories in the holiday collection Mistletoe (2006), which also features stories by Nina Malkin, Hailey Abbott, and Melissa de la Cruz. Friedman wrote a short story, "Three Fates" for the book 21 Proms. In 2007, Friedman published, along with artist Christine Norrie, a graphic novel entitled Breaking Up which details the complicated dynamics of junior year in an arts school in New York. In 2016, she published Two Summers.

Friedman grew up in Queens, New York, attended Bronx High School of Science, and graduated Phi Beta Kappa in 2001 with an AB in English from Vassar College. She resides in Manhattan. She went to a dance school with her older sister.

== Bibliography ==
=== Books By Aimee Friedman ===
- South Beach (2004)
- French Kiss (2005)
- A Novel Idea (2005)
- Hollywood Hills (2007)
- The Year My Sister Got Lucky (2008)
- Sea Change (2009)
- Two Summers (2016)

=== Contributor ===
- Mistletoe (2006)
- 21 Proms

=== Graphic novel ===
- Breaking Up (2007 - with Christine Norrie )

=== As Ruth Ames ===
- This Totally Bites - Poison Apple Book 2 (2009)
- At First Bite - Poison Apple Book 8 (2011)
