= The Crucible of Freya =

- Publisher: Necromancer Games
- Publication date: 2000
- ISBN: 1-56504-485-1

The Crucible of Freya is a 2000 role-playing game adventure published by Necromancer Games for d20 System.

== Plot summary ==
The Crucible of Freya is an adventure in which the player characters investigate orc raids.

== Publication history ==
According to Shannon Appelcline, the adventure "The Wizard's Amulet was intended to be a teaser for Necromancer's first print adventure, The Crucible of Freya (2000)." Appelcline also stated that "Necromancer produced much more standard fare for the early d20 market - which is to say adventures. This started off with The Crucible of Freya (2000), the Rappan Athuk mega-dungeon (2000) and Demons and Devils (2000).

== Reviews ==
- Backstab #26
- Black Gate
- Campaign Magazine (Issue 2 - Mar/Apr 2002)
- Dragon (German Issue 13 - Mar/Apr 2001)
- Pyramid
