= Scepter Tower of Spellgard =

Dungeons & Dragons adventure module

- Rules required: Dungeons & Dragons, 4th edition
- Character levels: 2nd
- Authors: David Noonan and Greg A. Vaughan
- First published: 2008

Scepter Tower of Spellgard is an adventure module for the 4th edition of the Dungeons & Dragons fantasy role-playing game.

== Plot summary ==
In Scepter Tower of Spellgard, a mysterious presence has taken up residence in one of the towers of Spellgard, and now its dark minions plague the Gray Vale. This is the first full-length Forgotten Realms adventure published for 4th Edition Dungeons & Dragons. This adventure can be paired with the adventure that appears in the Forgotten Realms Campaign Guide. This stand-alone adventure is designed to take characters from 2nd level to 4th level.

== Publication history ==
FR1 Scepter Tower of Spellgard was published in 2008, and was written by David Noonan and Greg A. Vaughan, with art by Attila Adorjany, Miguel Coimbra, Robert Lazzaretti, Warren Mahy, Jim Pavelec, Steve Prescott, and Emi Tanji.

Shannon Appelcline commented that with Fourth Edition Dungeons & Dragons, Wizards of the Coast intended to publish only three books for each campaign setting, and after that move on to a new setting the following year: "The Forgotten Realms Campaign Guide (2008), the Forgotten Realms Player's Guide (2008) and FR1: Scepter Tower of Spellgard (2008) kicked off the cycle... and were some of Wizards' worst-received supplements ever. This was largely because Wizards had decided to destroy the old Forgotten Realms to make it fit into their ideas of a 'points of light' setting. Old gods and NPCs were gone, kingdoms had fallen, the timeline was dramatically advanced and the Realms lay in ruins. From the scathing reviews that the new setting books got, it seems likely that they did as much to alienate existing fans from fourth-edition play as the core rulebooks had."
