= Clark A. Peterson =

American game designer and state magistrate judge

Clark Allen Peterson is the co-creator of Necromancer Games and founder of Legendary Games, and an Idaho state magistrate judge in Coeur d'Alene.

== Role-playing games industry ==
Peterson and his friend Bill Webb formed Necromancer Games in spring 2000 to publish role-playing materials using the d20 license; on August 10, 2000, the day Wizards of the Coast released their new edition of the Player's Handbook at GenCon 33, Peterson and Webb published their free PDF adventure The Wizard's Amulet just after midnight. On September 13, 2000, Necromancer Games announced a partnership with White Wolf Publishing in helping them form their "Sword & Sorcery" imprint; Peterson and Webb produced numerous rulebooks for White Wolf, such as Creature Collection (2000), Relics & Rituals (2000), The Divine and The Defeated (2001), and Creature Collection II (2001). Peterson ran the tournament adventure "Return to the Caverns of Thracia" at GenCon XXXV in 2002, after Necromancer Games formed a partnership with Judges Guild whereby they would begin to release products from Judges Guild in 2003.

Peterson was initially supportive of the GSL for fourth edition D&D when Wizards of the Coast announced the license in April 2008, but after seeing the new license applied he declared in July that it was "a total unmitigated failure". In March 2010, Peterson declared that Necromancer Games was on indefinite hiatus. The next year Peterson created Legendary Games, focusing on plug-in material for Pathfinder Roleplaying Game adventure paths and sourcebooks.

== Career in law ==
Peterson attended Washington and Lee University for his undergraduate education and graduated from Loyola Law School. He was admitted to the California Bar in 1994 and the Idaho Bar in 2001. He was a deputy district attorney in Las Vegas. He was a defense attorney at Amendola Doty & Brumley PLLC in Coeur d'Alene. Peterson was selected to fill a vacant judge magistrate's seat in Idaho's First District Court (Kootenai County) in 2010. Peterson retained his position as magistrate with 81% of the vote in 2012.

In December 2013, two litigants in cases over which Judge Peterson had presided made claims that Peterson's recent financial and marital problems and role-playing hobby distracted him from his duties. Administrative District Judge Lansing Haynes defended Peterson, describing him as "extraordinarily engaged in his work," "a real agile thinker," "a great resource to other judges", and "hard-working" with a "sharp focus". He saw no problem with Peterson posting on message boards during breaks from work. Peterson asserted that his hobby has never delayed a hearing or prevented him from doing work. In response to the concerns, Peterson announced plans to not post during business hours and to use caution in commenting about products. He also deleted his online avatar to focus on his judicial activities.

Peterson was the target of protesters prior to his 2016 reelection. Despite this, he won 73% of the vote to retain his position as a magistrate.

The 1st district's domestic violence court set up in 2013 was selected as a model of leadership by the U.S. Office on Violence Against Women in 2020. "You wouldn't necessarily think little ol' Idaho is a leader in something, but we have a long, really great tradition for our courts and specialty courts," said currently presiding judge Peterson. Peterson was again re-elected as magistrate for Kootenai County in 2020, this time with over 81%.
