= Bill Webb (game designer) =

Role-playing game designer

- Occupation: Game designer

Bill Webb is a game designer who has worked primarily on role-playing games.

== Career ==
Bill Webb and his long-time friend Clark Peterson formed Necromancer Games in the spring of 2000 to publish role-playing materials using the impending d20 license; Peterson and Webb published the free PDF adventure The Wizard's Amulet just after midnight on August 10, 2000, the same day that Wizards of the Coast released the new Player's Handbook at GenCon 33. Necromancer Games announced on September 13, 2000, that they had formed a partnership with White Wolf in creating their "Sword and Sorcery Studios" imprint, and Peterson and Webb produced many rulebooks for White Wolf including Creature Collection (2000), Relics & Rituals (2000), The Divine and The Defeated (2001), and Creature Collection II (2001).

Webb has since cofounded Frog God Games focusing on adventures designed for both the Pathfinder Roleplaying Game and Swords & Wizardry. Webb created Frog God Games to continue his own publication; the parting with Necromancer was amicable and they passed all rights to Webb for the publication Slumbering Tsar, along with any related Necromancer IP. Frog God also purchased the remaining Necromancer backstock from White Wolf, Kenzer & Company and Troll Lord Games, with Webb warehousing the books in his garage and began selling them through eBay in May 2010.

=== Sexual harassment allegations ===
Webb has admitted to "inappropriate and unprofessional interactions" at PaizoCon 2017 towards Paizo representative BJ Hensley, who interpreted his behavior as sexual harassment. Public discussion of this behavior led to calls to boycott conventions hosting Webb as a guest and business partners publishing Frog God material; Webb withdrew from Gary Con 2019 and Steve Jackson Games offered partial refunds to backers of its The Fantasy Trip Kickstarter campaign (which contained a setting and adventures developed by Frog God) who wished to withdraw their support, though Steve Jackson indicated that future projects with the company were in progress and would not be canceled. In response, Frog God Games instituted a policy that Webb be accompanied by a company associate at all future conventions, and in a joint statement with Ms. Hensley pledged a $1000 donation to RAINN, along with the charitable portion of "one of their next charity bundles". Frog God Games also "reiterate[d] [their] request to [their] fans that they not make attacks on BJ in any way."
