= Rob Lazzaretti =

American artist

- Born: Rob Lazzaretti
- Known for: Fantasy art, Illustration

Rob Lazzaretti is an artist whose work has appeared largely as a cartographer for roleplaying games, particularly the Dungeons & Dragons fantasy role-playing game from TSR.

== Biography ==
Rob Lazzaretti was born and raised in central Illinois. His father was an avid wargamer, and introduced him to role-playing games; while they were at a hobby shop, Lazzaretti discovered the first edition Advanced Dungeons & Dragons books, and as he puts it "was instantly hooked". Lazzaretti was really drawn into the RPG hobby through the game Call of Cthulhu: "In 1984, my father and I went to the Gen Con Game Fair in Racine, Wisconsin. There I met Sandy Petersen, and he introduced me to the game. I was really drawn to the imagery." His interest in the visual elements of RPGs led him to consider a career as an artist: "Everybody in my gaming group had me drawing sketches of their characters. In high school, I was the kid drawing all the weird stuff for people I knew, like Iron Maiden album covers on the backs of their jackets. Art always seems to win people over, even if they think you're a geek." Lazzaretti went on to study fine art at Illinois State University, but then switched over to design.

Lazaretti worked as an intern at Game Designers Workshop for a year, helping produce products such as Dark Conspiracy and Dangerous Journeys. TSR contacted him after seeing his cartography work on Dangerous Journeys, and he took a job with TSR in 1993. He immediately began working on the Planescape campaign setting: "It was a big responsibility. I hadn't done posters before, and suddenly I was doing a ton of them. Huge poster-sized maps. I couldn't believe how many there were. [TSR artist] Dennis Kauth was kind of my teacher and showed me the ropes." After working on numerous TSR products, Lazzaretti became the Art Director of Cartography for Wizards of the Coast, overseeing the production of maps for all Wizards of the Coast role-playing game products. This work included the Dark•Matter setting for the Alternity game: "I had a blast doing the cartography... I read Wolfgang's initial text and started doing conceptual stuff right away. It didn't even seem like work. I think Dark•Matter will be one of the best things I've done for years to come." Lazzaretti also helped to create a cohesive look for the core books and dungeon maps for the Dungeons & Dragons third edition.

== Works ==
Rob Lazzaretti worked as an artist on the Dangerous Journeys and Traveller roleplaying games before working largely as a cartographer for many Dungeons & Dragons products since 1994. He has also worked as a cartographer for other roleplaying game companies such as Green Ronin Publishing and Paizo Publishing.
