= Francis Tsai =

American artist

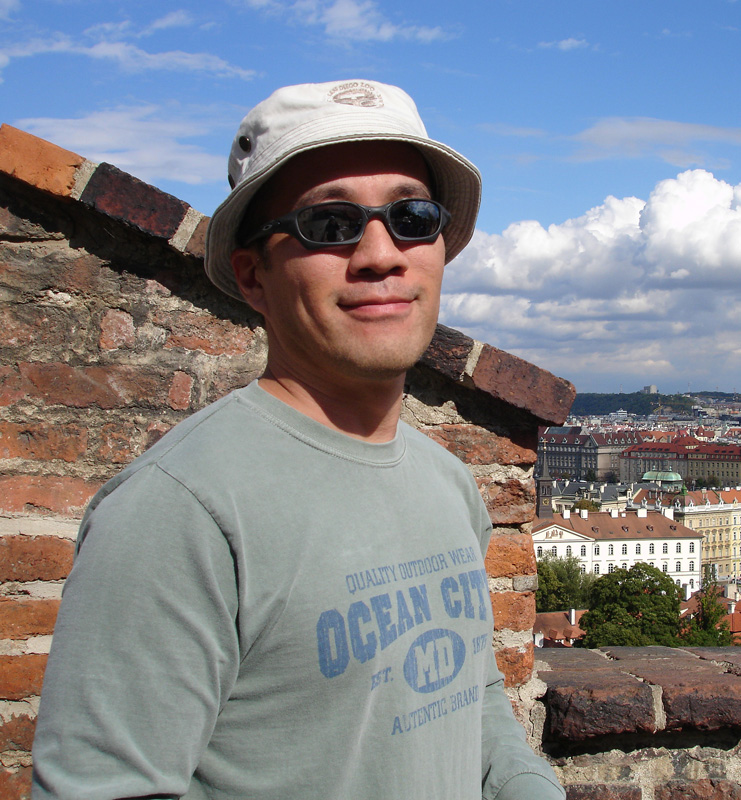
- Tsai in 2008
- Born: Honolulu, Hawaii, U.S. April 14, 1967
- Died: April 23, 2015 (aged 48)
- Areas: comic book artist, illustrator, conceptual artist, author

Francis Tsai (April 14, 1967 – April 23, 2015) was an American comic book artist, illustrator, author and conceptual artist. He was of Taiwanese and Japanese ancestry.

== Early life ==
Tsai was born in Honolulu, Hawaii, and raised in Lubbock, Texas. He initially studied chemistry, before receiving a graduate degree in architecture.

== Career ==
In 1998, Francis Tsai joined Presto Studios as Conceptual Designer where he provided visual development and game design for the video games Myst 3, and Star Trek: Hidden Evil. In 2003, Tsai joined High Moon Studios where he was principal concept artist for the video games The Bourne Conspiracy and Darkwatch.

Tsai had illustrated cards for the Magic: The Gathering collectible card game.

In 2009, Tsai worked on a five-issue graphic novel miniseries called Tracker for Top Cow Productions. A preview was released at that year's ComicCon.

=== Marvel Comics ===
Tsai also contributed covers and interior art for Marvel Comics.

Tsai provided interior artwork for Secret Identities: The Asian American Superhero Anthology, as well as covers and interior artwork for the serialized graphic novel Mercy Thompson: Homecoming, which reached number eight on the Comics Bestsellers list in October 2009. In a generally favorable review of the novel, Martha Cornog wrote, "Francis Tsai's and Amelia Woo's painted art, especially their beautiful wolf depictions, make this all visually believable." Tsai also created interiors for trade paperback Impaler.

=== Dungeons & Dragons ===
Tsai provided interior artwork for a number of Dungeons & Dragons manuals for Wizards of the Coast, including Sharn: City of Towers, Monster Manual III, d20 Future, Races of Eberron, Lost Empires of Faerûn, Explorer's Handbook, Tome of Magic: Pact, Shadow, and Truename Magic, Power of Faerûn, Drow of the Underdark, and d20 Future Tech. Tsai created the artwork for the Dungeons & Dragons 4th edition Dungeon Masters Screen.

=== TV and film ===
Tsai provided visual development in the TV and film industries contributing concept artwork for Motion Theory's Gatorade "Inside Crosby" and Lenovo Thinkpad "Rollcage" commercials as well as the film TMNT - Teenage Mutant Ninja Turtles. Tsai worked on Tracker, a miniseries from Top Cow Productions and Heroes and Villains Entertainment about an FBI agent who has contracted a virus that turns him into a werewolf.

=== Books and magazines ===
He was a regular contributor to ImagineFX magazine, where he has created a series of workshops including topics such as using 3-D in 2-D, effective character design and game concept art.

Francis Tsai wrote and illustrated the book Fantasy Art Academy: 100 Ways to Paint the Coolest Fantasy Figures for F&W Publications and recently released another book Extreme Worlds in November 2009.

== Recognition ==
Tsai won numerous professional awards for his work.

== Amyotrophic lateral sclerosis ==
In 2010, at the age of 42, Tsai was diagnosed with amyotrophic lateral sclerosis (ALS), also known as Lou Gehrig's Disease. The disease cost him the ability to move his arms and hands; he was unable to hold a pencil after early 2011. He discovered he could digitally paint on his cellphone with his right big toe while holding the cellphone with his left foot. Once he lost the ability to move his feet, Tsai began using the PC Eye from Tobii in conjunction with a Kiosk Tablet to communicate. By early 2012, Tsai began creating art again using the eye-gaze technology with drawing programs Sketchup and Photoshop. His eye-gaze art had been featured in the media including CNN and computer art magazine ImagineFX (August 2013).

== Personal life ==
Tsai met his wife Linda when they were architecture students at the University of Texas, and they lived in Austin, Texas. He died April 23, 2015.

== Bibliography ==
=== Comics ===
- Heroes for Hire #11, 14, 15 (2007, covers)
- World War Hulk Gamma Corps #4 (2007, cover)
- Exiles #1 (March 2008, cover)
- Marvel Adventures Spider-Man #35 (March 2008, cover)
- Marvel Adventures Iron Man #11 (May 2008, cover)
- Marvel Comics Presents vol. 2 #3, 6 (2008, inks only)
- Marvel Comics Presents vol. 2 #4, 7-12 (2008 pencils and inks)
- Impaler vol. 1 (2008, interiors and color)
- Mercy Thompson: Homecoming vols. 1 and 2 (2008, covers and interiors)
- Secret Identities: The Asian American Superhero Anthology (2009 pencils and inks)
- Tracker (2010, Art)

=== Contributions ===
- Machine Flesh
- Fantasy Art Now: The Very Best in Contemporary Fantasy Art and Illustration
- 50 Robots to Draw and Paint: Create Fantastic Robot Characters for Comic Books, Computer Games, and Graphic Novels
- How to Draw Fantasy Females
- Fantasy: Illustrated Fantasy and Sci-Fi Magazine
- Erotic Fantasy Art
