= Ari Marmell =

American novelist and game writer

- Born: Ari Marmell; New York
- Education: University of Houston
- Occupation: Game designer
- Writing career
- Genre: Role-playing games

Ari Marmell is an American novelist and freelance role-playing game writer.

== Novels ==
His first novel, Gehenna: The Final Night, was published in 2004 by White Wolf Publishing. Agents of Artifice, a media tie-in novel set in the Magic: The Gathering Planeswalkers game-setting, and published by Wizards of the Coast, followed in November 2009.

His first novel that was not based on a role-playing game was 2010's The Conqueror's Shadow. Reviewing the novel for Booklist, Krista Hutley wrote, "This action-packed, morally gray fantasy has an intriguingly twisty plot, full of magic and political intrigue." Reviewer Clay Kallam wrote that it "has a lot going for it, but it still didn't leave me completely satisfied." The sequel to The Conqueror's Shadow is 2011's The Warlord's Legacy. Library Journal wrote that it "fills a vital niche in the fantasy adventurer genre, one occupied by the heroes of Michael Moorcock's Elric Melniboné novels and C.S. Friedman's Coldfire Trilogy."

In 2011, Marmell's novel, The Goblin Corps was published by Pyr. This novel was written from the perspective of the traditional "bad guys": the goblins themselves.

In February 2012, Pyr also released Marmell's Thief's Covenant, first in his "Widdershins Adventures" Young Adult series. It was followed by False Covenant, the second "Widdershins Adventures" novel. The third "Widdershins Adventures" novel was announced on April 24, 2013 along with a preview of the cover art and synopsis. The novel will be published on December 3, 2013 and will be called Lost Covenant.

On February 1, 2012, it was announced Marmell would pen a novel set in the Darksiders universe. Darksiders is a video game series published by THQ and developed by Vigil Games. The novel is titled Darksiders: The Abomination Vault and will be published by Random House Publishing Group. The novel will ship earlier than the actual game, in July, whereas Darksiders 2 will ship in August. It centers around the adventures of Death and War, two of the Four Horsemen of the Apocalypse.

== Short fiction ==
Notable short stories from Marmell include "The Flight of the Righteous Indignation" from Tales of the Last War (Wizards of the Coast, April 2006), "The Ogre’s Pride," (a tie-in to The Conqueror's Shadow (originally published in Spectra Pulse, April 2010), and "Twenty-One-Oh" from the multimedia anthology, Foreshadows: The Ghosts of Zero (Blindsided Books, February 2012).

== Role-playing games ==
He has written extensively for the role-playing game industry, including White Wolf Publishing and Wizards of the Coast.

Dungeons & Dragons supplements for which he has written include:

- Cityscape
- Drow of the Underdark
- Tome of Magic
- Fortress of the Yuan-Ti
- Dark Sun Creature Catalog

== Personal life ==
Marmell was born in New York State, but moved to Houston, Texas when he was one year old. He attended college at the University of Houston, graduating in 1996. He lives in Austin, Texas with his wife, George.
