= Robert J. Schwalb =

American game designer

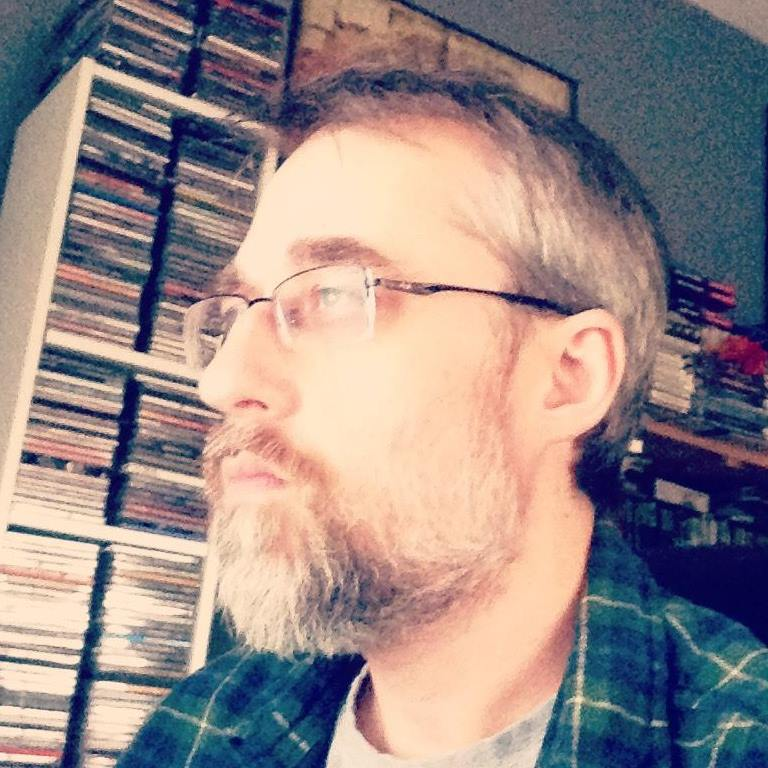
- Robert Schwalb, 2015
- Occupation: Game designer
- Known for: Dungeons & Dragons

Robert J. Schwalb is a writer in the role-playing game industry, and has worked as a game designer and developer for such games as Dungeons & Dragons, A Song of Ice and Fire Roleplaying, Warhammer Fantasy Roleplay, Shadow of the Demon Lord, and many other RPG supplements.

== Career ==
Robert J. Schwalb has worked for Wizards of the Coast. His works produced for the Dungeons & Dragons game include: Fiendish Codex II: Tyrants of the Nine Hells (2006, with Robin Laws), Drow of the Underdark (2007, with Ari Marmell, Anthony Pryor, and Greg A. Vaughan), Elder Evils (2007), Exemplars of Evil (2007), Tome of Magic (2006, with Matthew Sernett, Dave Noonan, and Ari Marmell), Player's Handbook II (2006).

He has also worked for Green Ronin Publishing on Warhammer Fantasy Roleplay, and made contributions to Witch Hunter: The Invisible World for Paradigm Concepts (2007).

Schwalb worked for years as a developer and staff member at Green Ronin. Schwalb, Patrick O'Duffy and Chris Pramas wrote The Pirate's Guide to Freeport (2007), a 256-page sourcebook about the city of Freeport, published by Green Ronin. Schwalb designed the game A Song of Ice and Fire Roleplaying, which was previewed at Free RPG Day in 2008 and published in 2009; this was the final project by Schwalb for Green Ronin before he before he went to work for Wizards of the Coast. His additional role-playing work includes work for Black Industries, Fantasy Flight Games, and several other companies.

Schwalb worked as the writer beginning in 2008 on the "Demonomicon of Iggwilv" column as part of the online version of Dragon, beginning with articles for the demon characters Yeenoghu and Baphomet.

Schwalb also co-wrote Divine Power, a 4th Edition D&D supplement, which made the Wall Street Journal Best-Seller list for July 2009.

In 2012, Schwalb became one of the lead designers for the fifth edition of Dungeons & Dragons. He also wrote for Monte Cook Games' Numenera line, including the Numenera Character Options book and the adventure Beyond All Worlds.

In 2014, after completing his work on the fifth edition, Schwalb launched Schwalb Entertainment and began writing a new RPG entitled Shadow of the Demon Lord.

In 2018, Schwalb contributed to the new Judge Dredd role-playing game, Judge Dredd & The Worlds of 2000 AD, by EN World's EN Publishing.

In late 2019 Schwalb created Punkapocalyptic: The Role Playing Game, using the same system as Shadow of the Demon Lord. It is based on the 30mm miniature wargame of the same name from Bad Roll Games, where players act as mercenaries in a post-apocalyptic wasteland. The game was released using Kickstarter.

== Dragon and Dungeon magazine articles ==
- Schwalb, Robert J. "Elder Evils: Shothragot." Dragon #362. Renton, WA: Wizards of the Coast, 2008. Available online: Dragon: Features
- -----. "The Essence of Evil." Dungeon #152. Renton, WA: Wizards of the Coast, 2007. Available online: Dungeon #152 Table of Contents
- -----. "Infernal Aristocracy: Dukes of Hell." Dragon #360. Renton, WA: Wizards of the Coast, 2007. Available online: Dragon #360 Table of Contents
- -----. "Into the Maw." Dungeon #147. Bellevue, WA: Paizo Publishing, June 2007.
- -----. "Lassiviren the Dark: Ruthless Assassin." Dungeon #114. Bellevue, WA: Paizo Publishing, September 2004.
- -----. "Shadow of Shothragot: The Price of Survival." Renton, WA: Wizards of the Coast, 2007. Available online: Dragon: Features

== Awards ==
- Grimm (Fantasy Flight Games), designer - 2004 Silver ENnie Award for Best d20 Game
- The Book of Fiends (Green Ronin Publishing), designer - 2004 Silver ENnie for Best Revision, Update or Compilation
- Advanced Bestiary (Green Ronin Publishing), developer - 2005 Silver ENnie for Best Monster or Adversary Product
- Black Company campaign setting (Green Ronin Publishing), designer - 2005 Silver ENnie for Best Campaign Setting or Setting Supplement
- Warhammer Fantasy Roleplay (Black Industries), additional design - 2005 Gold ENnie for Best Game
- Tome of Horrors 3 (Necromancer Games), additional design - 2006 Gold ENnie for Best Adversary/Monster Product
- Children of the Horned Rat (Black Industries), design and development - 2007 Silver ENnie for Best Writing
- Warhammer Fantasy RolePlay: Lure of the Liche Lord (Black Industries), additional design and development - 2007 Gold ENnie for Best Adventure
- Elder Evils (Wizards of the Coast), lead designer - 2008 Silver ENnie for Best Monster/Adversary
- Pirate's Guide to Freeport (Green Ronin Publishing), designer - 2008 Silver ENnie for Best Setting
- A Song of Ice and Fire Roleplaying (Green Ronin Publishing), designer - 2009 Silver ENnie for Best Rules
- Player's Handbook 3 (Wizards of the Coast), designer - 2010 Silver ENnie for Best Supplement
- Song of Ice and Fire Campaign Guide - 2011 nomination for Best Games Supplement Origins award
