= Warren Mahy =

New Zealand artist

- Known for: Fantasy art

Warren Mahy is an artist whose work has appeared in role-playing games and other fantasy works.

== Early life and education ==
Warren was born in the small sea side town of Whakatāne in New Zealand. He grew up surrounded by the wonders of the Pacific Ocean and the native New Zealand bush. This influenced his life towards a career in design and illustration.

== Career ==
After finishing school Warren went on to complete a trade certificate in offset printing and then eventually found his way via an old school friend, Ben Wootten, to Wētā Workshop Ltd where Ben and he were employed as concept designers during the Lord of the Rings, King Kong and Narnia films. Warren then freelanced from his studio/home in Tauranga working on storyboarding and illustrations for the RPG and Trading card industry. He currently works as a teacher for Graphic Designs at a secondary school.

Warren has been a freelance concept designer, story board artist and production illustrator for the film, TV and gaming industry. His most notable work so far would be his contribution to the designing of Peter Jackson’s trilogy of blockbusters, The Lord of The Rings. His influence can also be seen in numerous other films, including the remake of King Kong and Andrew Adamson’s Narnia series. Warren’s illustrations are also seen in print, predominantly within the Trading card and the Role playing industry.

Mahy is also known for his work on Magic: The Gathering.

=== Special effects ===
- The Chronicles of Narnia: The Lion, the Witch and the Wardrobe (2005): Designer
- The Lord of the Rings: The Return of the King (2003): Designer
- The Lord of the Rings: The Two Towers (2002): Designer
- The Lord of the Rings: The Fellowship of the Ring (2001): Designer

=== Art ===
- The Lord of the Rings: The Fellowship of the Ring (2001): Designer
- The Lord of the Rings: The Two Towers (2002): Designer
- The Lord of the Rings: The Return of the King (2003) : Designer
- The World of Kong (2005) : Designer
- The Crafting of Narnia (2008) : Designer
