= Ben Wootten =

New Zealand artist and designer

- Born: March 28, 1969 (age 57); Essex, England, UK

Benjamin (Ben) Charles Wootten is a graphic artist and designer based in Wellington, New Zealand.

== Early life and education ==
Wootten was born in Essex, England in 1969, and his family moved to New Zealand when he was three. He grew up in Whakatāne. As a teenager, he was interested in Dungeons & Dragons as well as The Lord of the Rings. Wootten completed a degree in zoology at the University of Otago in Dunedin before moving to Christchurch where he studied Graphic Art at Christchurch Polytechnic.

== Career ==
Immediately on graduating Wootten began working at the Weta Workshop as a designer and started to work on the films of Peter Jackson. At first Wootten worked on King Kong (which was originally planned to be made before The Lord of the Rings trilogy). When Kong was canceled Wootten began to work on designs for Peter Jackson's The Lord of the Rings movie trilogy. A notable piece of work there was being closely involved in designing the Balrog, creating its design based on the illustrations of John Howe.

Wootten designed both Aragorn's Strider sword and Boromir's sword at Weta Workshop.

He has also worked on the film The Chronicles of Narnia: The Lion, the Witch and the Wardrobe.

His designs combined his knowledge of zoology with his artistic skill.

Wootten is now a freelance illustrator, working out of Wellington. Most of his recent work has been for RPGs and TCGs; with clients including Wizards of the Coast, Paizo and Upper Deck.

For Paizo, he has done interior illustrations for the Pathfinder: Curse of the Crimson Throne Player’s Guide, and for the GameMastery line, Crucible of Chaos.
