= Eva Widermann =

German illustrator and concept artist

- Born: June 6, 1978 (age 48)
- Known for: Fantasy art

Eva Widermann (born June 6, 1978) is an illustrator and concept artist whose work appears in role-playing games.

== Education ==
She went to the Scholastic of Graphic & Design, Munich.

== Career ==
Widermann started her graphic design career in 1998 and worked for several years in the advertising industry. In 2003 she became a freelance illustrator and concept artist, and her work has been published in books, magazines and games for clients such as Wizards of the Coast, Disney, and Paizo.

Her Dungeons & Dragons work includes Player's Handbook II (2006), Monster Manual IV (2006), Complete Mage (2006), Cityscape (2006), Complete Scoundrel (2007), Magic Item Compendium (2007), Drow of the Underdark (2007), Monster Manual V (2007), Elder Evils (2007), and the 4th edition Monster Manual (2008).

She also illustrates children's books, and has received positive reviews for Arctic Giants (2011), and The Orphan and the Polar bear (2011).

Widermann lived with her husband in Cork, Ireland for many years.
