= List of Pathfinder books =

This is a list of Pathfinder books for the Pathfinder Roleplaying Game fantasy role-playing game.

== Pathfinder Roleplaying Game First Edition ==
=== Pathfinder Roleplaying Game Rulebooks ===
Title	Date	Pages	ISBN	Format	Code	Author(s)	Link
Core Rulebook	August 13, 2009	576	ISBN 978-1-60125-150-3	Hardcover	PZO1110	Jason Bulmahn	
GameMastery Guide	June 23, 2010	320	ISBN 978-1-60125-217-3	Hardcover	PZO1114	Jason Bulmahn	
Bestiary	October 21, 2009	320	ISBN 978-1-60125-183-1	Hardcover	PZO1112	Jason Bulmahn	
Bestiary 2	December 29, 2010	320	ISBN 978-1-60125-268-5	Hardcover	PZO1116	Paizo Staff	
Bestiary 3	December 21, 2011	320	ISBN 978-1-60125-378-1	Hardcover	PZO1120	Jason Bulmahn	
Bestiary 4	October 30, 2013	320	ISBN 978-1-60125-575-4	Hardcover	PZO1127	Jason Bulmahn	
Bestiary 5	November 18, 2015	320	ISBN 978-1-60125-792-5	Hardcover	PZO1133	Jason Bulmahn	
Bestiary 6	April 26, 2017	320	ISBN 978-1-60125-931-8	Hardcover	PZO1137	James Jacobs	
Advanced Class Guide	August 14, 2015	256	ISBN 978-1-60125-671-3	Hardcover	PZO1129	Dennis Baker, Ross Byers, Jesse Benner, Savannah Broadway, Jason Bulmahn, Jim Groves, Tim Hitchcock, Tracy Hurley, Jonathan H. Keith, Will McCardell, Dale C. McCoy Jr, Tom Phillips, Stephen Radney-MacFarland, Thomas M. Reid, Sean K. Reynolds, F. Wesley Schneider, Tork Shaw, Owen K.C. Stephens, Russ Taylor	
Advanced Player’s Guide	August 5, 2010	320	ISBN 978-1-60125-246-3	Hardcover	PZO1115	Jason Bulmahn	
Advanced Race Guide	June 20, 2012	256	ISBN 978-1-60125-390-3	Hardcover	PZO1121	Jason Bulmahn	
Adventurer's Guide	May 24, 2017	192	ISBN 978-1-60125-938-7	Hardcover	PZO1138	Benjamin Bruck, John Compton, Crystal Frasier, Tim Hitchcock, Jenny Jarzabski, Isabelle Lee, Joe Pasini, Jessica Price, David Schwartz, and Josh Vogt	
Strategy Guide	March 25, 2015	160	ISBN 978-1-60125-626-3	Hardcover	PZO1128	Wolfgang Baur, Jason Bulmahn, John Compton, Jessica Price, Sean K Reynolds	
Occult Adventures	July 29, 2015	272	ISBN 978-1-60125-762-8	Hardcover	PZO1132	John Bennett, Logan Bonner, Robert Brookes, Jason Bulmanh, Ross Byers, Adam Daigle, John Compton, Jim Groves, Thurston Hillman, Eric Hindley, Brandon Hodge, Ben McFarland, Erik Mona, Jason Nelson, Tom Phillips, Stephen Radney-MacFarland, Thomas M. Reid, Alex Riggs, F. Wesley Schneider, Robert Schwalb, Mark Seifter, Russ Taylor, Steve Townshend	
Pathfinder Unchained	April 29, 2015	256	ISBN 978-1-60125-715-4	Hardcover	PZO1131	Dennis Baker, Jesse Benner, Ross Beyers, Logan Bonner, Jason Bulmahn, Robert Emerson, Tim Hitchcock, Jason Nelson, Tom Phillips, Stephen Radney-MacFarland, Thomas M. Reid, Robert Schwalb, Mark Seifter, Russ Taylor	
Villain Codex	November 16, 2016	256	ISBN 978-1-60125-906-6	Hardcover	PZO1136	Alexander Augunas, Logan Bonner, Paris Crenshaw, Dan Dillon, Crystal Frasier, Amanda Hamon Kunz, Eric Hindley, Mikko Kallio, Dale C. McCoy, Jr, Stephen Radney-MacFarland, Thomas M. Reid, Alistair Rigg, Alex Riggs, Mark Seifter, Linda Zayas-Palmer	
Monster Codex	October 22, 2014	256	ISBN 978-1-60125-686-7	Hardcover	PZO1130	Jason Bulmahn	
Horror Adventures	August 4, 2016	256	ISBN 978-1-60125-849-6	Hardcover	PZO1135	Jason Bulmahn	
Mythic Adventures	August 14, 2013	256	ISBN 978-1-60125-549-5	Hardcover	PZO1126	Jason Bulmahn	
NPC Codex	November 21, 2012	320	ISBN 978-1-60125-467-2	Hardcover	PZO1124	Jason Bulmahn	
Ultimate Campaign	May 29, 2013	256	ISBN 978-1-60125-498-6	Hardcover	PZO1125	Jason Bulmahn	
Ultimate Combat	August 4, 2011	256	ISBN 978-1-60125-359-0	Hardcover	PZO1118	Jason Bulmahn	
Ultimate Equipment	August 16, 2012	400	ISBN 978-1-60125-449-8	Hardcover	PZO1123	Jason Bulmahn	
Ultimate Intrigue	March 30, 2016	256	ISBN 978-1-60125-826-7	Hardcover	PZO1134	Jason Bulmahn	
Ultimate Magic	May 8, 2011	256	ISBN 978-1-60125-299-9	Hardcover	PZO1117	Jason Bulmahn	
Book of the Damned	September 27, 2017	258	ISBN 978-1-60125-986-8	Hardcover	PZO1139	Alexander Augunas, John Bennett, Robert Brookes, John Compton, Dan Dillon, Steven T. Helt, Thurston Hillman, Eric Hindley, Mikko Kallio, Jason Keeley, Isabelle Lee, Jason Nelson, Stephen Radney-MacFarland, Alex Riggs, David N. Ross, David Schwartz, Mark Seifter, Jeffery Swank, Linda Zayas-Palmer	
Ultimate Wilderness	November 15, 2017	288	ISBN 978-1-60125-986-8	Hardcover	PZO1140	Alexander Augunas, John Bennett, Robert Brookes, John Compton, Dan Dillon, Steven T. Helt, Thurston Hillman, Eric Hindley, Mikko Kallio, Jason Keeley, Isabelle Lee, Jason Nelson, Stephen Radney-MacFarland, Alex Riggs, David N. Ross, David Schwartz, Mark Seifter, Jeffery Swank, and Linda Zayas-Palmer	
Planar Adventures	June 27, 2018	192	ISBN 978-1-64078-044-6	Hardcover	PZO1141	James Jacobs	

=== Pathfinder Adventure Paths ===
Title	Date	Pages	ISBN	Format	Code	Author(s)	Link
Rise of the Runelords #1: Burnt Offerings	August 2007	96	ISBN 978-1-60125-035-3	Softcover	PZO9001	James Jacobs	
Rise of the Runelords #2: The Skinsaw Murders	September 2007	96	ISBN 978-1-60125-037-7	Softcover	PZO9002	Richard Pett	
Rise of the Runelords #3: The Hook Mountain Massacre	October 2007	96	ISBN 978-1-60125-038-4	Softcover	PZO9003	Nicolas Logue	
Rise of the Runelords #4: Fortress of the Stone Giants	November 2007	96	ISBN 978-1-60125-039-1	Softcover	PZO9004	Wolfgang Baur	
Rise of the Runelords #5: Sins of the Saviors	December 2007	96	ISBN 978-1-60125-040-7	Softcover	PZO9005	Stephen S. Greer	
Rise of the Runelords #6: Spires of Xin-Shalast	January 2008	96	ISBN 978-1-60125-041-4	Softcover	PZO9006	Greg A. Vaughan	
Curse of the Crimson Throne #1: Edge of Anarchy	February 2008	96	ISBN 978-1-60125-088-9	Softcover	PZO9007	Nicolas Logue	
Curse of the Crimson Throne #2: Seven Days to the Grave	March 2008	96	ISBN 978-1-60125-091-9	Softcover	PZO9008	F. Wesley Schneider	
Curse of the Crimson Throne #3: Escape From Old Korvosa	April 2008	96	ISBN 978-1-60125-092-6	Softcover	PZO9009	Richard Pett	
Curse of the Crimson Throne #4: A History of Ashes	May 2008	96	ISBN 978-1-60125-093-3	Softcover	PZO9010	Michael Kortes	
Curse of the Crimson Throne #5: Skeletons of Scarwall	June 2008	96	ISBN 978-1-60125-099-5	Softcover	PZO9011	Greg A. Vaughan	
Curse of the Crimson Throne #6: Crown of Fangs	July 2008	96	ISBN 978-1-60125-109-1	Softcover	PZO9012	Tito Leati	
Second Darkness #1: Shadow in the Sky	August 2008	96	ISBN 978-1-60125-115-2	Softcover	PZO9013	Greg A. Vaughan	
Second Darkness #2: Children of the Void	September 2008	96	ISBN 978-1-60125-127-5	Softcover	PZO9014	Mike McArctor	
Second Darkness #3: The Armageddon Echo	October 2008	96	ISBN 978-1-60125-128-2	Softcover	PZO9015	Jason Bulhman	
Second Darkness #4: Endless Night	November 2008	96	ISBN 978-1-60125-129-9	Softcover	PZO9016	F. Wesley Schneider	
Second Darkness #5: A Memory of Darkness	December 2008	96	ISBN 978-1-60125-130-5	Softcover	PZO9017	J.D. Wiker	
Second Darkness #6: Descent into Midnight	January 2009	96	ISBN 978-1-60125-131-2	Softcover	PZO9018	Brian Cortijo	
Legacy of Fire #1: Howl of the Carrion King	March 2009	96	ISBN 978-1-60125-159-6	Softcover	PZO9019	Erik Mona	
Legacy of Fire #2: House of the Beast	March 2009	96	ISBN 978-1-60125-160-2	Softcover	PZO9020	Tim Hitchcock	
Legacy of Fire #3: The Jackal's Price	April 2009	96	ISBN 978-1-60125-161-9	Softcover	PZO9021	Darrin Drader	
Legacy of Fire #4: The End of Eternity	May 2009	96	ISBN 978-1-60125-173-2	Softcover	PZO9022	Jason Nelson	
Legacy of Fire #5: The Impossible Eye	June 2009	96	ISBN 978-1-60125-179-4	Softcover	PZO9023	Greg A. Vaughan	
Legacy of Fire #6: The Final Wish	July 2009	96	ISBN 978-1-60125-185-5	Softcover	PZO9024	Rob McCreary	
Council of Thieves #1: The Bastards of Erebus	August 2009	96	ISBN 978-1-60125-190-9	Softcover	PZO9025	Sean K. Reynolds	
Council of Thieves #2: The Sixfold Trial	September 2009	96	ISBN 978-1-60125-196-1	Softcover	PZO9026	Richard Pett	
Council of Thieves #3: What Lies in Dust	November 2009	96	ISBN 978-1-60125-197-8	Softcover	PZO9027	Michael Kortes	
Council of Thieves #4: The Infernal Syndrom	December 2009	96	ISBN 978-1-60125-198-5	Softcover	PZO9028	Clinton Boomer & James Jacobs	
Council of Thieves #5: Mother of Flies	January 2010	96	ISBN 978-1-60125-199-2	Softcover	PZO9029	Greg A. Vaughan	
Council of Thieves #6: The Twice-Damned Prince	January 2010	96	ISBN 978-1-60125-226-5	Softcover	PZO9030	Brian Cortijo & James Jacobs	
Kingmaker #1: Stolen Land	March 2010	96	ISBN 978-1-60125-229-6	Softcover	PZO9031	Tim Hitchcock	
Kingmaker #2: Rivers Run Red	April 2010	96	ISBN 978-1-60125-233-3	Softcover	PZO9032	Rob McCreary	
Kingmaker #3: The Varnhold Vanishing	May 2010	96	ISBN 978-1-60125-234-0	Softcover	PZO9033	Greg A. Vaughan	
Kingmaker #4: Blood for Blood	June 2010	96	ISBN 978-1-60125-251-7	Softcover	PZO9034	Neil Spicer	
Kingmaker #5: War of the River Kings	July 2010	96	ISBN 978-1-60125-252-4	Softcover	PZO9035	Jason Nelson	
Kingmaker #6: Sound of a Thousand Screams	July 2010	96	ISBN 978-1-60125-253-1	Softcover	PZO9036	Richard Pett	
Serpent's Skull #1: Soul for Smuggler's Shiv	August 2010	96	ISBN 978-1-60125-254-8	Softcover	PZO9037	James Jacobs	
Serpent's Skull #2: Racing to Ruin	September 2010	96	ISBN 978-1-60125-273-9	Softcover	PZO9038	Tim Hitchcock	
Serpent's Skull #3: City of Seven Spears	November 2010	96	ISBN 978-1-60125-274-6	Softcover	PZO9039	James Jacobs, Kevin Kulp & Rob McCreary	
Serpent's Skull #4: Vaults of Madness	December 2010	96	ISBN 978-1-60125-275-3	Softcover	PZO9040	Greg A. Vaughan	
Serpent's Skull #5: The Thousand Fangs Below	January 2011	96	ISBN 978-1-60125-276-0	Softcover	PZO9041	Graeme Davis	
Serpent's Skull #6: Sanctum of the Serpent God	February 2011	96	ISBN 978-1-60125-307-1	Softcover	PZO9042	Neil Spicer	
Carrion Crown #1: The Haunting of Harrowstone	March 2011	96	ISBN 978-1-60125-308-8	Softcover	PZO9043	Michael Kortes	
Carrion Crown #2: Trial of the Beast	April 2011	96	ISBN 978-1-60125-309-5	Softcover	PZO9044	Richard Pett	
Carrion Crown #3: Broken Moon	May 2011	96	ISBN 978-1-60125-310-1	Softcover	PZO9045	Tim Hitchcock	
Carrion Crown #4: Wake of the Watcher	June 2011	96	ISBN 978-1-60125-311-8	Softcover	PZO9046	Greg A. Vaughan	
Carrion Crown #5: Ashes at Dawn	July 2011	96	ISBN 978-1-60125-312-5	Softcover	PZO9047	Neil Spicer	
Carrion Crown #6: Shadows of Gallowspire	July 2011	96	ISBN 978-1-60125-313-2	Softcover	PZO9048	Brandon Hodge	
Jade Regent #1: The Brinewall Legacy	August 2011	96	ISBN 978-1-60125-361-3	Softcover	PZO9049	James Jacobs	
Jade Regent #2: Night of Frozen Shadows	September 2011	96	ISBN 978-1-60125-366-8	Softcover	PZO9050	Greg A. Vaughan	
Jade Regent #3: The Hungry Storm	October 2011	96	ISBN 978-1-60125-374-3	Softcover	PZO9051	Jason Nelson	
Jade Regent #4: Forest of Spirits	November 2011	96	ISBN 978-1-60125-380-4	Softcover	PZO9052	Richard Pett	
Jade Regent #5: Tide of Honor	January 2012	96	ISBN 978-1-60125-385-9	Softcover	PZO9053	Tito Leati	
Jade Regent #6: The Empty Throne	February 2012	96	ISBN 978-1-60125-400-9	Softcover	PZO9054	Neil Spicer	
Skull & Shackles #1: The Wormwood Mutiny	February 2012	96	ISBN 978-1-60125-404-7	Softcover	PZO9055	Richard Pett	
Skull & Shackles #2: Raiders of the Fever Sea	March 2012	96	ISBN 978-1-60125-409-2	Softcover	PZO9056	Greg A. Vaughan	
Skull & Shackles #3: Tempest Rising	April 2012	96	ISBN 978-1-60125-413-9	Softcover	PZO9057	Matthew Goodall	
Skull & Shackles #4: Island of Empty Eyes	May 2012	96	ISBN 978-1-60125-416-0	Softcover	PZO9058	Neil Spicer	
Skull & Shackles #5: The Price of Infamy	June 2012	96	ISBN 978-1-60125-421-4	Softcover	PZO9059	Tim Hitchcock	
Skull & Shackles #6: From Hell's Heart	July 2012	96	ISBN 978-1-60125-422-1	Softcover	PZO9060	Jason Nelson	
Rise of the Runelords	July 2012	432	ISBN 978-1-60125-436-8	Hardcover	PZO1002	James Jacobs	
Shattered Star #1: Shards of Sin	August 2012	96	ISBN 978-1-60125-452-8	Softcover	PZO9061	Greg A. Vaughan	
Shattered Star #2: Curse of the Lady's Light	September 2012	96	ISBN 978-1-60125-459-7	Softcover	PZO9062	Mike Shel	
Shattered Star #3: The Asylum Stone	October 2012	96	ISBN 978-1-60125-469-6	Softcover	PZO9063	James L. Sutter	
Shattered Star #4: Beyond the Doomsday Door	November 2012	96	ISBN 978-1-60125-474-0	Softcover	PZO9064	Tito Leati	
Shattered Star #5: Into the Nightmare Rift	December 2012	96	ISBN 978-1-60125-487-0	Softcover	PZO9065	Richard Pett	
Shattered Star #6: The Dead Heart of Xin	January 2013	96	ISBN 978-1-60125-491-7	Softcover	PZO9066	Brandon Hodge	
Reign of Winter #1: The Snows of Summer	February 2013	96	ISBN 978-1-60125-492-4	Softcover	PZO9067	Neil Spicer	
Reign of Winter #2: The Shackled Hut	March 2013	96	ISBN 978-1-60125-493-1	Softcover	PZO9068	Jim Groves	
Reign of Winter #3: Maiden, Mother, Crone	April 2013	96	ISBN 978-1-60125-494-8	Softcover	PZO9069	Tim Hitchcock	
Reign of Winter #4: The Frozen Stars	May 2013	96	ISBN 978-1-60125-495-5	Softcover	PZO9070	Matthew Goodall	
Reign of Winter #5: Rasputin Must Die!	June 2013	96	ISBN 978-1-60125-496-2	Softcover	PZO9071	Brandon Hodge	
Reign of Winter #6: The Witch Queen's Revenge	July 2013	96	ISBN 978-1-60125-497-9	Softcover	PZO9072	Greg A. Vaughan	
Wrath of the Righteous #1: The Worldwound Incursion	August 2013	96	ISBN 978-1-60125-553-2	Softcover	PZO9073	Amber E. Scott	
Wrath of the Righteous #2: Sword of Valor	September 2013	96	ISBN 978-1-60125-568-6	Softcover	PZO9074	Neil Spicer	
Wrath of the Righteous #3: Demon's Heresy	October 2013	96	ISBN 978-1-60125-577-8	Softcover	PZO9075	Jim Groves	
Wrath of the Righteous #4: The Midnight Isles	December 2013	96	ISBN 978-1-60125-585-3	Softcover	PZO9076	Greg A. Vaughan & James Jacobs	
Wrath of the Righteous #5: Herald of the Ivory Labyrinth	January 2014	96	ISBN 978-1-60125-586-0	Softcover	PZO9077	Wolfgang Baur	
Wrath of the Righteous #6: City of Locusts	February 2014	96	ISBN 978-1-60125-587-7	Softcover	PZO9078	Richard Pett	
Mummy's Mask #1: The Half-Dead City	March 2014	96	ISBN 978-1-60125-588-4	Softcover	PZO9079	Jim Gorves	
Mummy's Mask #2: Empty Graves	April 2014	96	ISBN 978-1-60125-589-1	Softcover	PZO9080	Crystal Frasier	
Mummy's Mask #3: Shifting Sands	May 2014	96	ISBN 978-1-60125-590-7	Softcover	PZO9081	Richard Pett	
Mummy's Mask #4: Secrets of the Sphinx	June 2014	96	ISBN 978-1-60125-591-4	Softcover	PZO9082	Amber E. Scott	
Mummy's Mask #5: The Slave Trenches of Hakotep	July 2014	96	ISBN 978-1-60125-592-1	Softcover	PZO9083	Michael Kortes	
Mummy's Mask #6: Pyramid of the Sky Pharaoh	July 2014	96	ISBN 978-1-60125-593-8	Softcover	PZO9084	Mike Shel	
Iron Gods #1: Fires of Creation	August 2014	96	ISBN 978-1-60125-673-7	Softcover	PZO9085	Neil Spicer	
Iron Gods #2: Lords of Rust	September 2014	96	ISBN 978-1-60125-678-2	Softcover	PZO9086	Nicolas Logue	
Iron Gods #3: The Choking Tower	October 2014	96	ISBN 978-1-60125-688-1	Softcover	PZO9087	Ron Lundeen	
Iron Gods #4: Valley of the Brain Collectors	November 2014	96	ISBN 978-1-60125-704-8	Softcover	PZO9088	Mike Shel	
Iron Gods #5: Palace of Fallen Stars	December 2014	96	ISBN 978-1-60125-711-6	Softcover	PZO9089	Tim Hitchcock	
Iron Gods #6: The Divinity Drive	January 2015	96	ISBN 978-1-60125-724-6	Softcover	PZO9090	Crystal Frasier	
Giantslayer #1: Battle of Bloodmarch Hill	February 2015	96	ISBN 978-1-60125-725-3	Softcover	PZO9091	Patrick Renie	
Giantslayer #2: The Hill Giant's Pledge	April 2015	96	ISBN 978-1-60125-726-0	Softcover	PZO9092	Larry Whilhelm	
Giantslayer #3: Forge of the Giant God	May 2015	96	ISBN 978-1-60125-727-7	Softcover	PZO9093	Tim Hitchcock	
Giantslayer #4: Ice Tomb of the Giant Queen	June 2015	96	ISBN 978-1-60125-728-4	Softcover	PZO9094	Jim Groves	
Giantslayer #5: Anvil of Fire	June 2015	96	ISBN 978-1-60125-729-1	Softcover	PZO9095	Sean K. Reynolds	
Giantslayer #6: Shadow of the Storm Tyrant	July 2015	96	ISBN 978-1-60125-730-7	Softcover	PZO9096	Tito Leati	
Hell's Rebels #1: In Hell's Bright Shadow	September 2015	96	ISBN 978-1-60125-768-0	Softcover	PZO9097	Crystal Frasier	
Hell's Rebels #2: Turn of the Torrent	September 2015	96	ISBN 978-1-60125-784-0	Softcover	PZO9098	Mike Shel	
Hell's Rebels #3: Dance of the Damned	October 2015	96	ISBN 978-1-60125-788-8	Softcover	PZO9099	Richard Pett	
Hell's Rebels #4: A Song of Silver	December 2015	128	ISBN 978-1-60125-795-6	Softcover	PZO90100	James Jacobs	
Hell's Rebels #5: The Kintargo Contract	January 2016	96	ISBN 978-1-60125-800-7	Softcover	PZO90101	Jim Groves	
Hell's Rebels #6: Breaking the Bones of Hell	January 2016	96	ISBN 978-1-60125-808-3	Softcover	PZO90102	Amber E. Scott	
Hell's Vengeance #1: The Hellfire Compact	February 2016	96	ISBN 978-1-60125-818-2	Softcover	PZO90103	F. Wesley Schneider	
Hell's Vengeance #2: Wrath of Thrune	March 2016	96	ISBN 978-1-60125-824-3	Softcover	PZO90104	Thurston Hillman	
Hell's Vengeance #3: The Inferno Gate	April 2016	96	ISBN 978-1-60125-827-4	Softcover	PZO90105	Patrick Renie	
Hell's Vengeance #4: For Queen & Empire	May 2016	96	ISBN 978-1-60125-836-6	Softcover	PZO90106	Stephen Radney-MacFarland	
Hell's Vengeance #5: Scourge of the Godclaw	June 2016	96	ISBN 978-1-60125-842-7	Softcover	PZO90107	Larry Wilhelm	
Hell's Vengeance #6: Hell Comes to Westcrown	August 2016	96	ISBN 978-1-60125-851-9	Softcover	PZO90108	Ron Lundeen	
Strange Aeons #1: In Search of Sanity	August 2016	96	ISBN 978-1-60125-882-3	Softcover	PZO90109	F. Wesley Schneider	
Strange Aeons #2: The Thrushmoor Terror	September 2016	96	ISBN 978-1-60125-892-2	Softcover	PZO90110	Tito Leati	
Curse of the Crimson Throne	October 2016	480	ISBN 978-1-60125-890-8	Hardcover	PZO1021	James Jacobs, Michael Kortes, et al.	
Strange Aeons #3: Dreams of the Yellow King	November 2016	96	ISBN 978-1-60125-899-1	Softcover	PZO90111	Ron Lundeen	
Strange Aeons #4: The Whisper Out of Time	December 2016	96	ISBN 978-1-60125-908-0	Softcover	PZO90112	Richard Pett	
Strange Aeons #5: What Grows Within	January 2017	96	ISBN 978-1-60125-913-4	Softcover	PZO90113	John Compton	
Strange Aeons #6: Black Stars Beckon	February 2017	96	ISBN 978-1-60125-919-6	Softcover	PZO90114	Jim Groves	
Ironfang Invasion #1: Trail of the Hunted	March 2017	96	ISBN 978-1-60125-926-4	Softcover	PZO90115	Amber E. Scott	
Ironfang Invasion #2: Fangs of War	March 2017	96	ISBN 978-1-60125-932-5	Softcover	PZO90116	Ron Lundeen	
Ironfang Invasion #3: Assault on Longshadow	April 2017	96	ISBN 978-1-60125-935-6	Softcover	PZO90117	Benjamin Bruck & Thurston Hillman	
Ironfang Invasion #4: Siege of Stone	May 2017	96	ISBN 978-1-60125-940-0	Softcover	PZO90119	Thurston Hillman	
Ironfang Invasion #5: Prisoners of the Blight	June 2017	96	ISBN 978-1-60125-943-1	Softcover	PZO90119	Amanda Hamon Kunz	
Ironfang Invasion #6: Vault of the Onyx Citadel	July 2017	96	ISBN 978-1-60125-952-3	Softcover	PZO90120	Larry Wilhelm	
Ruins of Azlant #1: The Lost Outpost	August 2017	96	ISBN 978-1-60125-964-6	Softcover	PZO90121	Jim Groves	
Ruins of Azlant #2: Into the Shattered Continent	September 2017	96	ISBN 978-1-60125-972-1	Softcover	PZO90122	Robert Brookes	
Ruins of Azlant #3: The Flooded Cathedral	October 2017	96	ISBN 978-1-60125-981-3	Softcover	PZO90123	Mikko Kallio	
Ruins of Azlant #4: City in the Deep	November 2017	96	ISBN 978-1-60125-988-2	Softcover	PZO90124	Amber E. Scott	
Ruins of Azlant #5: Tower of the Drowned Dead	December 2017	96	ISBN 978-1-60125-998-1	Softcover	PZO90125	Ron Lundeen	
Ruins of Azlant #6: Beyond the Veiled Past	December 2017	96	ISBN 978-1-64078-009-5	Softcover	PZO90126	Thurston Hillman	
War for the Crown #1: Crownfall	February 2018	96	ISBN 978-1-64078-015-6	Softcover	PZO90127	Thurston Hillman	
War for the Crown #2: Songbird, Scion, Saboteur	March 2018	96	ISBN 978-1-64078-025-5	Softcover	PZO90128	Crystal Frasier and Richard Pett	
War for the Crown #3: The Twilight Child	April 2018	96	ISBN 978-1-64078-032-3	Softcover	PZO90129	Ron Lundeen	
War for the Crown #4: City in the Lion's Eye	May 2018	96	ISBN 978-1-64078-037-8	Softcover	PZO90130	Mikko Kallio	
War for the Crown #5: The Reaper's Right Hand	June 2018	96	ISBN 978-1-64078-045-3	Softcover	PZO90131	John Compton	
War for the Crown #6: The Six-Legend Soul	July 2018	96	ISBN 978-1-64078-052-1	Softcover	PZO90132	Amber E. Scott	
Return of the Runelords #1: Secrets of Roderic's Cove	August 2018	96	ISBN 978-1-64078-062-0	Softcover	PZO90133	Adam Daigle	
Return of the Runelords #2: It Came from Hollow Mountain	September 2018	96	ISBN 978-1-64078-070-5	Softcover	PZO90134	Mike Shel	
Return of the Runelords #3: Runeplague	October 2018	96	ISBN 978-1-64078-079-8	Softcover	PZO90135	Richard Pett	
Return of the Runelords #4: Temple of the Peacock Spirit	November 2018	96	ISBN 978-1-64078-091-0	Softcover	PZO90136	Jason Keely	
Return of the Runelords #5: The City Outside of Time	December 2018	96	ISBN 978-1-64078-098-9	Softcover	PZO90137	Amanda Hamon Kunz	
Return of the Runelords #6: Rise of New Thassilon	January 2019	96	ISBN 978-1-64078-106-1	Softcover	PZO90138	Greg A. Vaughan	
Tyrant's Grasp #1: The Dead Roads	February 2019	96	ISBN 978-1-64078-111-5	Softcover	PZO90139	Ron Lundeen	
Tyrant's Grasp #2: Eulogy for Roslar's Coffer	March 2019	96	ISBN 978-1-64078-119-1	Softcover	PZO90140	Jason Keeley	
Tyrant's Grasp #3: Last Watch	April 2019	96	ISBN 978-1-64078-126-9	Softcover	PZO90141	Larry Wilhelm	
Tyrant's Grasp #4: Gardens of Gallowspire	May 2019	96	ISBN 978-1-64078-134-4	Softcover	PZO90142	Crystal Frasier	
Tyrant's Grasp #5: Borne by the Sun's Grace	June 2019	96	ISBN 978-1-64078-140-5	Softcover	PZO90143	Luis Loza	
Tyrant's Grasp #6: Midwives to Death	August 2019	96	ISBN 978-1-64078-144-3	Softcover	PZO90144	John Compton	

=== Pathfinder Modules ===
Title	Date	Pages	Starting Level	ISBN	Format	Code	Author(s)	Link
Hollow's Last Hope	June 2007	16	1st		Softcover	PZO9500	Jason Bulmahn, F. Wesley Schneider	
Crown of the Kobold King	June 2007	32	2nd	978-1-60125-048-3	Softcover	PZO9501	Nicolas Logue	
Conquest of Bloodsworn Vale	July 2007	32	6th	978-1-60125-049-0	Softcover	PZO9502	Jason Bulmahn	
Seven Swords of Sin	August 2007	32	7th	978-1-60125-050-6	Softcover	PZO9503	James L. Sutter & Paizo Staff	
Gallery of Evil	September 2007	32	8th	978-1-60125-051-3	Softcover	PZO9504	Stephen S. Greer	
Entombed with the Pharaohs	October 2007	32	6th	978-1-60125-052-0	Softcover	PZO9505	Michael Kortes	
Into the Haunted Forest	November 2007	16	1st	978-1-60125-108-4	Softcover	PZO9500-TC1	Greg A. Vaughan	
Carnival of Tears	November 2007	32	5th	978-1-60125-055-1	Softcover	PZO9506	Tim Hitchcock, Nicolas Logue	
Guardians of Dragonfall	December 2007	32	11th	978-1-60125-056-8	Softcover	PZO9507	Anson Caralya	
Hangman's Noose	January 2008	32	1st	978-1-60125-073-5	Softcover	PZO9508	Nicolas Logue	
Crucible of Chaos	February 2008	32	8th	978-1-60125-074-2	Softcover	PZO9509	Wolfgang Baur	
River into Darkness	March 2008	32	4th	978-1-60125-075-9	Softcover	PZO9510	Greg A. Vaughan	
The Demon Within	April 2008	32	11th	978-1-60125-076-6	Softcover	PZO9511	Stephen S. Greer, Tim Hitchcock	
Flight of the Red Raven	May 2008	32	4th	978-1-60125-101-5	Softcover	PZO9512	David Schwartz	
Revenge of the Kobold King	June 2008	16	5th		Softcover	PZO9500-2	Nicolas Logue	
Tower of the Last Baron	June 2008	32	5th	978-1-60125-102-2	Softcover	PZO9513	Stephen S. Greer	
Treasure of Chimera Cove	October 2008	32	7th	978-1-60125-119-0	Softcover	PZO9514	Anson Caralya	
Hungry Are the Dead	October 2008	32	6th	978-1-60125-120-6	Softcover	PZO9515	Tim Hitchcock	
The Pact Stone Pyramid	November 2008	32	8th	978-1-60125-145-9	Softcover	PZO9516	Michael Kortes	
Clash of the Kingslayers	January 2009	32	10th	978-1-60125-125-1	Softcover	PZO9517	Christine Schneider	
Blood of Dragonscar	March 2009	32	15th	978-1-60125-170-1	Softcover	PZO9518	Keith Baker	
Beyond the Vault of Souls	July 2009	32	9th	978-1-60125-174-9	Softcover	PZO9519	Colin McComb	
Crypt of the Everflame	August 2009	32	1st	978-1-60125-186-2	Softcover	PZO9520NM	Jason Bulmahn	
Carrion Hill	November 2009	32	5th	978-1-60125-206-7	Softcover	PZO9521	Richard Pett	
Masks of the Living God	December 2009	32	3rd	978-1-60125-207-4	Softcover	PZO9522	Jason Bulmahn	
Realm of the Fellnight Queen	February 2010	32	7th	978-1-60125-224-1	Softcover	PZO9523	Neil Spicer	
City of Golden Death	April 2010	32	5th	978-1-60125-225-8	Softcover	PZO9524	Joshua J. Frost	
From Shore to Sea	June 2010	32	6th	978-1-60125-257-9	Softcover	PZO9525	Brandon Hodge	
Master of the Fallen Fortress	June 2010	16	1st	978-1-60125-365-1	Softcover	PZO9500-4	Rob McCreary	
Curse of the Riven Sky	July 2010	32	10th	978-1-60125-258-6	Softcover	PZO9526	Monte Cook	
The Witchwar Legacy	September 2010	32	17th	978-1-60125-279-1	Softcover	PZO9527	Greg A. Vaughan	
The Godsmouth Heresy	December 2010	32	1st	978-1-60125-280-7	Softcover	PZO9528	Rob McCreary	
Cult of the Ebon Destroyers	February 2011	32	8th	978-1-60125-317-0	Softcover	PZO9529	Matt Goodall	
Tomb of the Iron Medusa	April 2011	32	14th	978-1-60125-318-7	Softcover	PZO9530	Mike Shel	
Academy of Secrets	June 2011	32	13th	978-1-60125-343-9	Softcover	PZO9531	Brian Cortijo	
We Be Goblins!	June 2011	16	1st		Softcover	PZO9500-5	Richard Pett	
The Harrowing	July 2011	32	9th	978-1-60125-355-2	Softcover	PZO9532	Crystal Frasier	
Feast of Ravenmoor	September 2011	32	3rd	978-1-60125-367-5	Softcover	PZO9533	Brandon Hodge	
The Ruby Phoenix Tournament	January 2012	32	11th	978-1-60125-381-1	Softcover	PZO9534	Tim Hitchcock	
The Midnight Mirror	April 2012	32	4th	978-1-60125-401-6	Softcover	PZO9535	Sam Zeitlin	
No Response from Deepmar	May 2012	32	8th	978-1-60125-410-8	Softcover	PZO9536	Stephen S. Greer	
Dawn of the Scarlet Sun	June 2012	16	5th		Softcover	PZO9500-6	James Jacobs	
The Moonscar	August 2012	32	16th	978-1-60125-426-9	Softcover	PZO9537	Richard Pett	
Murder's Mark	October 2012	32	1st	978-1-60125-447-4	Softcover	PZO9538	Jim Groves	
Thornkeep	October 2012	96	1st	978-1-60125-519-8	Softcover	PZOGWK0001E	Richard Baker, Jason Bulmahn, Ed Greenwood, James Jacobs, Erik Mona, and Goblinworks Staff	
Broken Chains	March 2013	32	6th	978-1-60125-461-0	Softcover	PZO9539	Tim Hitchcock	
Fangwood Keep	April 2013	32	4th	978-1-60125-476-4	Softcover	PZO9540	Alex Greenshields	
Doom Comes to Dustpawn	May 2013	32	9th	978-1-60125-504-4	Softcover	PZO9541	Mike Welham	
We Be Goblins Too!	June 2013	16	3rd		Softcover	PZO9500-7	Richard Pett	
The Dragon's Demand	July 2013	64	1st	978-1-60125-527-3	Softcover	PZO9542	Mike Shel	
Wardens of the Reborn Forge	December 2013	64	12th	978-1-60125-555-6	Softcover	PZO9543	Patrick Renie	
Tears at Bitter Manor	March 2014	64	5th	978-1-60125-613-3	Softcover	PZO9544	Steven Helt	
Risen from the Sands	June 2014	16	3rd		Softcover	PZO9500-8	Rob McCreary	
The Emerald Spire Superdungeon	June 2014	160	1st	978-1-60125-655-3	Hardback	PZO9545	Keith Baker, Richard Baker, Wolfgang Baur, Jason Bulmahn, Ed Greenwood, Tim Hitchcock, James Jacobs, Nicolas Logue, Frank Mentzer, Erik Mona, Chris Pramas, Sean K. Reynolds, F. Wesley Schneider, Michael A. Stackpole, Lisa Stevens, James L. Sutter	
Plunder & Peril	November 2014	64	4th	978-1-60125-680-5	Softcover	PZO9546	Matt Goodall, Alex Greenshields, Steven Helt, Ben McFarland	
Daughters of Fury	February 2015	64	3rd	978-1-60125-706-2	Softcover	PZO9547	Victoria Jaczko	
We Be Goblins Free!	June 2015	16	4th		Paperback	PZO9500-9	Richard Pett	
Feast of Dust	November 2015	64	11th	978-1-60125-735-2	Softcover	PZO9548	Nicolas Logue	
The House on Hook Street	December 2015	64	6th	978-1-60125-790-1	Softcover	PZO9549	Brandon Hodge	
Down the Blighted Path	February 2016	64	5th	978-1-60125-815-1	Softcover	PZO9550	Monica Marlowe	
Ire of the Storm	May 2016	64	1st	978-1-60125-830-4	Softcover	PZO9551	Thurston Hillman	
We B4 Goblins!	June 2016	16	1st		Softcover	PZO9500-10	Crystal Frasier	
Gallows of Madness	August 2016	64	1st	978-1-60125-854-0	Softcover	PZO9552	Mikko Kallio, Mike Kimmel, Benjamin Bruck	
Seers of the Drowned City	November 2016	64	6th	978-1-60125-902-8	Softcover	PZO9553	Nicholas Wasko et al.	
Heroes for Highdelve	August 2017	20	1st	978-1-64078-002-6	Softcover	PZOGENA001	Amanda Hamon	
The Gauntlet	May 2018	16	8th		PDF	PZOGAUNTLET	Jason Bulmahn, Erik Mona, Jessica Price, Stephen Radney-MacFarland	
We Be 5uper Goblins!	June 2018	16	6th		Softcover	PZO9500-12	Crystal Frasier	
Cradle of Night	December 2018	64	8th	978-1-60125-991-2	Softcover	PZO9554	James Jacobs, F. Wesley Schneider, Neil Spicer, Greg A. Vaughan	
We Be Heroes?	June 2019	16	1st		Softcover	PZO9500-14	Brian Duckwitz	

=== Pathfinder Player Companion Sourcebooks ===
32-page monthly installments exploring the major themes in the Pathfinder campaign setting including: expanded regional gazetteers, new player options, and organizational overviews to help players flesh out their character backgrounds and to provide players and Game Masters with new sources for campaign intrigue.

Title	Date	ISBN	Series Tie-In	Rules Set	Code	Author(s)	Link
Second Darkness	August 2008	978-1-60125-142-8	Second Darkness	D&D 3.5	PZO9401	James Jacobs, F. Wesley Schneider, Amber E. Scott, and Greg A. Vaughan	
Elves of Golarion	October 2008	978-1-60125-143-5		D&D 3.5	PZO9402	Hal Maclean and Jeff Quick	
Osirion, Land of Pharaohs	December 2008	978-1-60125-144-2		D&D 3.5	PZO9403	Jason Nelson and Amber Stewart	[209]
Legacy of Fire	March 2009	978-1-60125-168-8	Legacy of Fire	D&D 3.5	PZO9404	Brian Cortijo, Stephen S. Greer, James Jacobs, Jonathan H. Keith, Amber E. Scott, F. Wesley Schneider, and James L. Sutter	
Taldor, Echoes of Glory	April 2009	978-1-60125-169-5		D&D 3.5	PZO9405	Joshua J. Frost	
Qadira, Gateway to the East	June 2009	978-1-60125-180-0		PFRPG	PZO9406	Brian Cortijo	
Cheliax, Empire of Devils	August 2009	978-1-60125-191-6	Council of Thieves	PFRPG	PZO9407	Jonathan H. Keith, Colin McComb, Steven E. Schend, Leandra Christine Schneider, and Amber E. Scott	
Dwarves of Golarion	December 2009	978-1-60125-204-3		PFRPG	PZO9408	David Eitelbach, Russ Taylor, JD Wiker, Keri Wiker, and Hank Woon	
Andoran, Spirit of Liberty	January 2010	978-1-60125-205-0		PFRPG	PZO9409	Jonathan Keith, Hal Maclean, Colin McComb, Jason Nelson, and Hank Woon	
Adventurer's Armory	April 2010	978-1-60125-222-7	Kingmaker	PFRPG	PZO9410	Jonathan H. Keith, Hal Maclean, Jeff Quick, Chris Self, JD Wiker, and Keri Wiker	
Gnomes of Golarion	May 2010	978-1-60125-223-4		PFRPG	PZO9411	Colin McComb, Steven Schend, Sean K Reynolds, Owen K.C. Stephens, Mark Moreland, Jeff Quick, and Hal Maclean	
Sargava, The Lost Colony	June 2010	978-1-60125-255-5		PFRPG	PZO9412	JD Wiker and Sean K Reynolds	
Orcs of Golarion	August 2010	978-1-60125-256-2	Serpent's Skull	PFRPG	PZO9413	Steve Kenson, Rob McCreary, Richard Pett, Sean K Reynolds, and JD Wiker	
Inner Sea Primer	November 2010	978-1-60125-277-7		PFRPG	PZO9414	Colin McComb	
Halflings of Golarion	January 2011	978-1-60125-278-4		PFRPG	PZO9415	Hal Maclean and Amber Scott	
Faiths of Purity	April 2011	978-1-60125-314-9	Carrion Crown	PFRPG	PZO9416	Colin McComb	
Humans of Golarion	June 2011	978-1-60125-315-6		PFRPG	PZO9417	James Jacobs, Colin McComb, Sean K Reynolds, Amber Scott, and Larry Wilhelm	
Faiths of Balance	July 2011	978-1-60125-316-3		PFRPG	PZO9418	Colin McComb	
Goblins of Golarion	August 2011	978-1-60125-362-0	Jade Regent	PFRPG	PZO9419	Richard Pett	
Faiths of Corruption	October 2011	978-1-60125-375-0		PFRPG	PZO9420	Colin McComb	
Dragon Empires Primer	January 2012	978-1-60125-386-6		PFRPG	PZO9421	Colin McComb and Tim Hitchcock	
Pirates of the Inner Sea	February 2012	978-1-60125-405-4	Skull & Shackles	PFRPG	PZO9422	Amber Scott	
Blood of Fiends	April 2012	978-1-60125-423-8		PFRPG	PZO9423	Hal Maclean and Colin McComb	
Blood of Angels	July 2012	978-1-60125-438-2		PFRPG	PZO9424	Amber E. Scott	
Varisia, Birthplace of Legends	August 2, 2012	978-1-60125-453-5	Shattered Star	PFRPG	PZO9425	F. Wesley Schneider	
Knights of the Inner Sea	September 1, 2012	978-1-60125-460-3		PFRPG	PZO9426	Steve Kenson, Tork Shaw, and Dylan Birtolo	
Blood of the Night	December 6, 2012	978-1-60125-470-2		PFRPG	PZO9427	Tork Shaw	
People of the North	January 22, 2013	978-1-60125-475-7		PFRPG	PZO9428	Matthew Goodall, Shaun Hocking, Rob McCreary, Philip Minchin, and William Thrasher	
Animal Archive	February 13, 2013	978-1-60125-488-7	Reign of Winter	PFRPG	PZO9429	Amanda Hamon, Philip Minchin, Jason Nelson, Patrick Renie, Owen K.C. Stephens, and Christina Stiles	
Dungeoneer's Handbook	March 8, 2013	978-1-60125-510-5		PFRPG	PZO9430	Amanda Hamon, Gareth Hanrahan, David Ross, and Jerome Virnich	
Champions of Purity	April 16, 2013	978-1-60125-511-2		PFRPG	PZO9431	Jessica Blomstrom, Adam Daigle, Shaun Hocking, Daniel Marthaler, Tork Shaw, and Christina Stiles	
Kobolds of Golarion	June 13, 2013	978-1-60125-512-9		PFRPG	PZO9432	Mat Smith	
Quests & Campaigns	June 13, 2013	978-1-60125-513-6		PFRPG	PZO9433	Amanda Hamon and David N. Ross	
Dragonslayer's Handbook	July 11, 2013	978-1-60125-526-6		PFRPG	PZO9434	Shaun Hocking, Marie Small, and Jerome Virnich	
Pathfinder Society Primer	July 11, 2013	978-1-60125-534-1		PFRPG	PZO9435	John Compton and Mark Moreland	
Faiths & Philosophies	August 19, 2013	978-1-60125-543-3	Wrath of the Righteous	PFRPG	PZO9436	Savannah Broadway, Paris Crenshaw, Neall Raemonn Price, David Ross, Owen K.C. Stephens, and James L. Sutter	
Demon Hunter's Handbook	August 17, 2013	978-1-60125-554-9		PFRPG	PZO9437	Philip Minchin, F. Wesley Schneider, and Jerome Virnich	
Mythic Origins	September 25, 2013	978-1-60125-569-3		PFRPG	PZO9438	Dennis Baker, Philip Minchin, and Russ Taylor	
Blood of the Moon	October 21, 2013	978-1-60125-578-5		PFRPG	PZO9439	Tim Akers, Neal F. Litherland, David N. Ross, and Tork Shaw	
Magical Marketplace	December 11, 2013	978-1-60125-600-3		PFRPG	PZO9440	John Ling, Ron Lundeen, Patrick Renie, David Schwartz, Jerome Virnich	
People of the Sands	January 9, 2014	978-1-60125-601-0		PFRPG	PZO9441	Shaun Hocking, Rob McCreary, Jason Nelson	
Bastards of Golarion	February 6, 2014	978-1-60125-602-7	Mummy's Mask	PFRPG	PZO9442	Judy Bauer, Neal F. Litherland, Ryan Macklin, and David N. Ross	
Champions of Balance	March 25, 2014	978-1-60125-603-4		PFRPG	PZO9443	Matt Goodall, Ron Lundeen, Philip Minchin, Patrick Renie, Justin Riddler, and David Schwartz	
Undead Slayer's Handbook	April 30, 2014	978-1-60125-604-1		PFRPG	PZO9444	Dennis Baker, Jay Loomis, Alex Putnam, Adam Roy, Tork Shaw, and Larry Wilhelm	
Alchemy Manual	April 30, 2014	978-1-60125-605-8		PFRPG	PZO9445	Jason Nelson, Patrick Renie, and David N. Ross	
The Harrow Handbook	May 28, 2014	978-1-60125-650-8		PFRPG	PZO9446	Crystal Frasier, Will McCardell, and David Schwartz	
Blood of the Elements	June 25, 2014	978-1-60125-654-6		PFRPG	PZO9447	Tim Akers, Judy Bauer, Jim Groves, Chris Lites, Dale C. McCoy, Jr., and Cassidy Werner	
People of the River	July 25, 2014	978-1-60125-666-9		PFRPG	PZO9448	Tim Akers, Jason Brick, Ethan Day-Jones, James Jacobs, Nick Salestrom, David Schwartz, and William Thrasher.	
People of the Stars	August 14, 2014	978-1-60125-674-4	Iron Gods	PFRPG	PZO9449	Ethan Day-Jones, Jim Groves, Jonathan H. Keith Andrew Romine, David N. Ross, and James L. Sutter	
Champions of Corruption	September 10, 2014	978-1-60125-679-9		PFRPG	PZO9450	Paris Crenshaw, Jim Groves, Sean McGowan, and Philip Minchin	
Advanced Class Origins	October 22, 2014	978-1-60125-689-8		PFRPG	PZO9451	Dennis Baker, Ross Byers, Tom Phillips, Stephen Radney-MacFarland, and Owen K.C. Stephens	
Ranged Tactics Toolbox	November 24, 2014	978-1-60125-705-5		PFRPG	PZO9452	David N. Ross, David Schwartz, and Kaitlyn Sprague	
Giant Hunter's Handbook	December 17, 2014	978-1-60125-712-3		PFRPG	PZO9453	Alexander Augunas, Luis Loza, Ron Lundeen, and David N. Ross	
Familiar Folio	January 28, 2015	978-1-60125-731-4		PFRPG	PZO9454	Will McCardell, Philip Minchin, Mark Seifter, and Jerome Virnich	
Melee Tactics Toolbox	March 25, 2015	978-1-60125-732-1	Giant Slayer	PFRPG	PZO9455	Paris Crenshaw, Ron Lundeen, and David Schwartz	
Heroes of the Wild	April 29, 2015	978-1-60125-733-8		PFRPG	PZO9456	Tyler Beck, Pedro Coelho, Justin Juan, Mikko Kallio, Jason Keeley, Nick Salestrom, and William Thrasher	
Cohorts and Companions	May 27, 2015	978-1-60125-734-5		PFRPG	PZO9457	Brian Duckwitz, Philip Minchin, and Jason Nelson	
Monster Summoner's Handbook	June 24, 2015	978-1-60125-758-1		PFRPG	PZO9458	Alexander Augunas, Tyler Beck, Anthony Li, Luis Loza, David N. Ross, and Linda Zayas-Palmer	
Dirty Tactics Toolbox	September 2, 2015	978-1-60125-763-5	Hell's Rebels	PFRPG	PZO9459	Alexander Augunas, Mikko Kallio, Anthony Li, Luis Loza, and Andrew Marlowe	
Heroes of the Streets	September 30, 2015	978-1-60125-769-7		PFRPG	PZO9460	John Compton, Mikko Kallio, Nicolas Logue, Michael McCarthy, Mike Myler, and David N. Ross	
Occult Origins	October 21, 2015	978-1-60125-785-7		PFRPG	PZO9461	Robert Brookes, Ben McFarland, Jason Nelson, and Mark Seifter	
Black Markets	October 21, 2015	978-1-60125-789-5		PFRPG	PZO9462	Ron Lundeen, Jason Nelson, David N. Ross, and David Schwartz	
Weapon Master's Handbook	November 18, 2015	978-1-60125-796-3		PFRPG	PZO9463	Alexander Augunas and David N. Ross	
Agents of Evil	December 16, 2015	978-1-60125-801-4		PFRPG	PZO9464	Thurston Hillman	
Arcane Anthology	January 27, 2016	978-1-60125-814-4		PFRPG	PZO9465	Alexander Augunas, Steven T. Helt, and David N. Ross	
Blood of Shadows	February 24, 2016	978-1-60125-820-5	Hell's Vengeance	PFRPG	PZO9466	Alexander Augunas, Steven T. Helt, Luis Loza, and Ron Lundeen.	
Armor Master's Handbook	April 27, 2016	978-1-60125-829-8		PFRPG	PZO9467	Alexander Augunas, Robert Brookes, Anthony Li, Luis Loza, and David Schwartz.	
Magic Tactics Toolbox	May 25, 2016	978-1-60125-838-0		PFRPG	PZO9468	Alexander Augunas, Steven T. Helt, Thurston Hillman, and Ron Lundeen	
Spymaster's Handbook	June 29, 2016	978-1-60125-844-1		PFRPG	PZO9469	Alexander Augunas, David N. Ross, and Owen K.C. Stephens	
Legacy of Dragons	August 4, 2016	978-1-60125-853-3	Strange Aeons	PFRPG	PZO9470	Alexander Augunas, Robert Brookes, Thurston Hillman, Michelle Jones, Mikko Kallio, and Mark Seifter	
Haunted Heroes Handbook	August 31, 2016	978-1-60125-884-7		PFRPG	PZO9471	Alexander Augunas, Thurston Hillman, Isabelle Lee, Stephen Rowe, and Christopher Wasko	
Divine Anthology	September 28, 2016	978-1-60125-894-6		PFRPG	PZO9472	Alexander Augunas, Russ Brown, John Compton, Alex Riggs, and David Ross	
Blood of the Beast	November 16, 2016	978-1-60125-901-1		PFRPG	PZO9473	Alexander Augunas, John Compton, and Crystal Frasier	
Paths of the Righteous	December 14, 2016	978-1-60125-910-3		PFRPG	PZO9474	Alexander Augunas, John Compton, Jenny Jarzabski, Isabelle Lee, Stephen Rowe, and Owen K.C. Stephens	
Healer's Handbook	January 25, 2017	978-1-60125-914-1		PFRPG	PZO9475	Alexander Augunas, David N. Ross, and Stephen Rowe	
Heroes of the High Court	February 22, 2017	978-1-60125-920-2		PFRPG	PZO9476	Isabelle Lee, Luis Loza, Ron Lundeen, and Jacob W. Michaels	
Psychic Anthology	February 22, 2017	978-1-60125-928-8		PFRPG	PZO9477	Alexander Augunas, Isabelle Lee, Luis Loza, Alex Riggs, Mark Seifter, Loren Sieg, and Jeremy Smith	
Monster Hunter's Handbook	March 29, 2017	978-1-60125-933-2	Ironfang Invasion	PFRPG	PZO9478	Eric Hindley, Mikko Kallio, Luis Loza, and Christopher Wasko	
Heroes of the Darklands	April 26, 2017	978-1-60125-936-3		PFRPG	PZO9479	Robert Brookes, Eleanor Ferron, Michelle Jones, Alex Riggs, and Nicholas Wasko	
Legacy of the First World	May 31, 2017	978-1-60125-941-7		PFRPG	PZO9480	Judy Bauer, John Compton, Violet Hargrave, Mikko Kallio, Jason Keeley, Joe Pasini, Mark Seifter, Kendra Leigh Speedling, Josh Vogt, and Linda Zayas-Palmer	
Adventurer's Armory 2	June 28, 2017	978-1-60125-945-5		PFRPG	PZO9481	Jenny Jarzabski, Mikko Kallio, Isabelle Lee, Luis Loza, Joe Pasini, David N. Ross, and Linda Zayas-Palmer	
Blood of the Sea	July 26, 2017	978-1-60125-955-4		PFRPG	PZO9482	Amber E. Scott	
Elemental Master's Handbook	August 17, 2017	978-1-60125-965-3	Ruins of Azlant	PFRPG	PZO9483	John Compton, Eleanor Ferron, Mikko Kallio, Jason Keeley, Isabelle Lee, and Christopher Wasko	
Antihero's Handbook	September 20, 2017	978-1-60125-973-8		PFRPG	PZO9484	Emily Brumfield, Violet Hargrave, Susann Hessen, Mikko Kallio, Lyz Liddell, Adrian Ng, Joe Pasini, Lu Pellazar, Kyle T. Raes, David N. Ross, and Kendra Leigh Speedling	
Blood of the Coven	October 18, 2017	978-1-60125-982-0		PFRPG	PZO9485	John Compton, Eleanor Ferron, Crystal Frasier, Lissa Guillet, Elisa Mader, Adrian Ng, Mark Seifter, and Linda Zayas-Palmer	
People of the Wastes	November 15, 2017	978-1-60125-990-5		PFRPG	PZO9486	Logan Bonner, John Compton, Nathan King, Luis Loza, Christopher Wasko, and Linda Zayas-Palmer	
Potions & Poisons	December 13, 2017	978-1-64078-000-2		PFRPG	PZO9487	Kate Baker, Eleanor Ferron, Nathan King, Lyz Liddell, Luis Loza, Alex Putnam, Alex Riggs, and David Schwartz	
Disciple's Doctrine	January 31, 2018	978-1-64078-011-8		PFRPG	PZO9488	Saif Ansari, Mara Lynn Butler, Jeffrey Hersh, Vanessa Hoskins, Lyz Liddell, Luis Loza, and Linda Zayas-Palmer	
Merchant's Manifest	March 28, 2018	978-1-64078-026-2	War for the Crown	PFRPG	PZO9489	John Compton, Eleanor Ferron, Thurston Hillman, Nathan King, Isabelle Lee, Jacob W. Michaels, Adrian Ng, David N. Ross, and Mike Welham	
Blood of the Ancients	May 30, 2018	978-1-64078-038-5		PFRPG	PZO9490	John Compton, Vanessa Hoskins, James Jacobs, Mikko Kallio, Alex Riggs, Stephen Rowe, and Jeffrey Swank	
Heroes from the Fringe	August 29, 2018	978-1-64078-053-8	Return of the Runelords	PFRPG	PZO9491	Saif Ansari, Kate Baker, Michelle Jones, Isabelle Lee, Adrian Ng, Alex Riggs, and Owen K.C. Stephens	
Plane-Hopper's Handbook	September 19, 2018	978-1-64078-071-2		PFRPG	PZO9492	James Case, John Compton, Leo Glass, Avi Kool, Adrian Ng, Lu Pellazar, Daniel Reed, Mikhail Rekun, Amber E. Scott, Tork Shaw, and Linda Zayas-Palmer	
Martial Arts Handbook	November 14, 2018	978-1-64078-092-7		PFRPG	PZO9493	Thurston Hillman, Mikko Kallio, Jacob W. Michaels, Matt Morris, Daniel Reed, Mikhail Rekun, Mark Seifter, and Jeffrey Swank	
Wilderness Origins	January 30, 2019	978-1-64078-107-8		PFRPG	PZO9494	Kim Frandsen, Sasha Laranoa Harving, Violet Hargrave, Ron Lundeen, Andrew Mullen, Jessica Redekop, Mikhail Rekun, Sean K Reynolds, and Rodney Sloan	
Heroes of Golarion	March 27, 2019	978-1-64078-120-7	Tyrant's Grasp	PFRPG	PZO9495	Saif Ansari, Alexander Augunas, Mara Lynn Butler, Michelle Jones, Avi Kool, and Alex Riggs	
Chronicle of Legends	May 29, 2019	978-1-64078-136-8		PFRPG	PZO9496	Calder CaDavid, Vanessa Hoskins, Mike Kimmel, Isabelle Lee, Matt Morris, Mikhail Rekun, and Michael Sayre	

=== Pathfinder Campaign Setting Sourcebooks ===
Title	Date	Pages	ISBN	Format	Code	Author(s)	Link
Pathfinder Chronicles: Guide to Korvosa	March 2008	64	ISBN 978-1-60125-078-0	Paperback	PZO1106	Mike McArtor	
Pathfinder Chronicles: Gazetteer	April 2008	64	ISBN 978-1-60125-077-3	Paperback	PZO1105	Jason Bulmahn, Erik Mona	
Pathfinder Chronicles: Classic Monsters Revisited	April 2008	64	ISBN 978-1-60125-079-7	Paperback	PZO1107	James Jacobs et al.	
Pathfinder Chronicles: Guide to Darkmoon Vale	July 2008	64	ISBN 978-1-60125-100-8	Paperback	PZO1108	Mike McArtor	
Pathfinder Chronicles: Campaign Setting	August 2008	256	ISBN 978-1-60125-112-1	Hardcover	PZO1111	Erik Mona	
Pathfinder Chronicles: Gods and Magic	October 2008	32	ISBN 978-1-60125-139-8	Paperback	PZO9202	Sean K Reynolds	
Pathfinder Chronicles: Into the Darklands	November 2008	64	ISBN 978-1-60125-140-4	Paperback	PZO9204	James Jacobs, Greg A. Vaughan	
Pathfinder Chronicles: Guide to Absalom	December 2008	64	ISBN 978-1-60125-141-1	Paperback	PZO9205	Owen K.C. Stephens	
Pathfinder Chronicles: Dragons Revisited	March 2009	64	ISBN 978-1-60125-165-7	Paperback	PZO9207	Mike McArtor	
Pathfinder Chronicles: Dark Markets: A Guide to Katapesh	April 2009	64	ISBN 978-1-60125-166-4	Paperback	PZO9208	Stephen S. Greer, Amber E. Scott	
Pathfinder Chronicles: The Great Beyond	May 2009	64	ISBN 978-1-60125-167-1	Paperback	PZO9209	Amber Stewart	
Pathfinder Chronicles: Dungeon Denizens Revisited	May 2009	64	ISBN 978-1-60125-172-5	Paperback	PZO9210	Sean K Reynolds et al.	
Pathfinder Chronicles: Seekers of Secrets	October 2009	64	ISBN 978-1-60125-178-7	Paperback	PZO9211	Tim Hitchcock, Erik Mona, James L. Sutter, Russ Taylor	
Pathfinder Chronicles: Princes of Darkness	October 2009	64	ISBN 978-1-60125-189-3	Paperback	PZO9213	F. Wesley Schneider	
Pathfinder Chronicles: Cities of Golarion	November 2009	64	ISBN 978-1-60125-178-7	Paperback	PZO9214	Joshua J. Frost, Tim Hitchcock, Jonathan Keith, Rob McCreary, Jason Nelson, Jeff Quick	
Pathfinder Chronicles: Classic Horrors Revisited	January 2010	64	ISBN 978-1-60125-202-9	Paperback	PZO9216	James Jacobs, Rob McCreary, F. Wesley Schneider	
Pathfinder Chronicles: Guide to the River Kingdoms	February 2010	64	ISBN 978-1-60125-203-6	Paperback	PZO9217E	Elaine Cunningham, Steve Kenson, China Miéville, Chris Pramas, et al.	
Pathfinder Chronicles: NPC Guide	March 2010	64	ISBN 978-1-60125-219-7	Paperback	PZO9219	Hal Maclean, Jeff Quick, John Wick, et al.	
Pathfinder Chronicles: Classic Treasures Revisited	April 2010	64	ISBN 978-1-60125-220-3	Paperback	PZO9220	Amber Stewart, Michael Kortes, Jonathan H. Keith	
Pathfinder Chronicles: Faction Guide	May 2010	64	ISBN 978-1-60125-221-0	Paperback	PZO9221	Joshua J. Frost, Jason Nelson, Sean K Reynolds	
Pathfinder Chronicles: Heart of the Jungle	June 2010	64	ISBN 978-1-60125-247-0	Paperback	PZO9222	Tim Hitchcock, Jason Nelson, Amber Scott, Chris Self, Amber Stewart	
Pathfinder Chronicles: City of Strangers	July 2010	64	ISBN 978-1-60125-248-7	Paperback	PZO9223	James L. Sutter	
Misfit Monsters Redeemed	November 2010	64	ISBN 978-1-60125-270-8	Paperback	PZO9227	Adam Daigle, Crystal Frasier, Colin McComb, Rob McCreary, Jason Nelson, James L. Sutter	
Lords of Chaos	December 2010	64	ISBN 978-1-60125-250-0	Paperback	PZO9225	James Jacobs	
Lost Cities of Golarion	January 2011	64	ISBN 978-1-60125-272-2	Paperback	PZO9229	Tim Hitchcock, Brandon Hodge, Michael Kortes, Jason Nelson, Russ Taylor	
The Inner Sea World Guide	March 2011	320	ISBN 978-1-60125-269-2	Hardcover	PZO9226	James Jacobs, Erik Mona, et al.	
Rule of Fear	April 2011	64	ISBN 978-1-60125-301-9	Paperback	PZO9231	F. Wesley Schneider	
Rival Guide	May 2011	64	ISBN 978-1-60125-302-6	Paperback	PZO9232	Brandon Hodge, Colin McComb, Jason Nelson	
Undead Revisited	June 2011	64	ISBN 978-1-60125-303-3	Paperback	PZO9233	Amber Stewart, Brandon Hodge, Steve Kenson	
Dungeons of Golarion	July 2011	64	ISBN 978-1-60125-304-0	Paperback	PZO9234	Jason Bulmahn, Brandon Hodge, Anthony Pryor	
Pathfinder Society Field Guide	July 2011	64	ISBN 978-1-60125-305-7	Paperback	PZO9235	Erik Mona, Mark Moreland, Russ Taylor, Larry Wilhelm	
Inner Sea Magic	July 2011	64	ISBN 978-1-60125-360-6	Paperback	PZO9237	Jason Nelson, Sean K Reynolds, Owen K.C. Stephens	
Lands of the Linnorm Kings	October 2011	64	ISBN 978-1-60125-365-1	Paperback	PZO9238	Matthew Goodall, Jonathan Keith, Colin McComb, Rob McCreary	
Horsemen of the Apocalypse	November 2011	64	ISBN 978-1-60125-373-6	Paperback	PZO9239	Amber Stewart	
Dragon Empires Gazetteer	December 2011	64	ISBN 978-1-60125-379-8	Paperback	PZO9240	James Jacobs, Dave Gross, Rob McCreary	
Mythical Monsters Revisited	January 2012	64	ISBN 978-1-60125-384-2	Paperback	PZO9241	Jonathan H. Keith, Jason Nelson, Anthony Pryor	
Distant Worlds	February 2012	64	ISBN 978-1-60125-403-0	Paperback	PZO9243	James L. Sutter	
Isles of the Shackles	April 2012	64	ISBN 978-1-60125-408-5	Paperback	PZO9244	Mike Shel	
Giants Revisited	May 2012	64	ISBN 978-1-60125-412-2	Paperback	PZO9245	Jesse Benner, Ryan Costello, Brian R. James, Jason Nelson, Russ Taylor, Ray Vallese	
Lost Kingdoms	June 2012	64	ISBN 978-1-60125-415-3	Paperback	PZO9246	Wolfgang Bauer, Adam Daigle, Jeff Erwin, F. Wesley Schneider	
Magnimar, City of Monuments	July 2012	64	ISBN 978-1-60125-446-7	Paperback	PZO9248	Adam Daigle, James Jacobs	
Paths of Prestige	August 2012	64	ISBN 978-1-60125-451-1	Paperback	PZO9249	Jason Bulmahn, Benjamin Bruck, Matthew Goodall, Jason Nelson	
Artifacts & Legends	September 2012	64	ISBN 978-1-60125-458-0	Paperback	PZO9250	F. Wesley Schneider	
Inner Sea Bestiary	November 2012	64	ISBN 978-1-60125-468-9	Paperback	PZO9251	Jim Groves, James Jacobs, Rob McCreary, Erik Mona, Jason Nelson, Patrick Renie, F. Wesley Schneider, James L. Sutter, Russ Taylor, Greg A. Vaughan	
Mystery Monsters Revisited	December 2012	64	ISBN 978-1-60125-473-3	Paperback	PZO9252	Richard Pett, Anthony Pryor, Amber E. Scott, Ray Vallese	
Irrisen, Land of Eternal Winter	January 2013	64	ISBN 978-1-60125-486-3	Paperback	PZO9253	Mike Shel	
Chronicle of the Righteous	May 2013	64	ISBN 978-1-60125-506-8	Paperback	PZO9255	Amber Scott	
Fey Revisited	May 2013	64	ISBN 978-1-60125-507-5	Paperback	PZO9256	Savannah Broadway, Amanda Hamon, Tim Hitchcock, Levi Miles, Ray Vallese, Jerome Virnich	
Castles of the Inner Sea	June 2013	64	ISBN 978-1-60125-508-2	Paperback	PZO9257	Tim Hitchcock, Alyssa Faden	
Dragons Unleashed	June 2013	64	ISBN 978-1-60125-525-9	Paperback	PZO9258	Savannah Broadway, Joseph Carriker, Adam Daigle, Steve Kenson, Patrick Renie, F. Wesley Schneider, Tork Shaw	
The Worldwound	July 2013	64	ISBN 978-1-60125-532-7	Paperback	PZO9259	James Jacobs, Jonathan Keith, Jason Nelson, Amber Stewart, Tanith Tyrr	
Demons Revisited	August 2013	64	ISBN 978-1-60125-552-5	Paperback	PZO9261	James Jacobs	
Mythic Realms	September 2013	64	ISBN 978-1-60125-567-9	Paperback	PZO9262	Benjamin Bruck, Jason Bulmahn, Amanda Hamon, Nicolas Logue, Jason Nelson, F. Wesley Schneider, Russ Taylor	
Towns of the Inner Sea	October 2013	64	ISBN 978-1-60125-576-1	Paperback	PZO9263	Judy Bauer, Logan Bonner, Nicolas Logue, Matt Vancil	
Inner Sea NPC Codex	December 2013	64	ISBN 978-1-60125-594-5	Paperback	PZO9264	John Compton, Paris Crenshaw, Adam Daigle, Josh Foster, Rob McCreary, Mark Moreland, Russ Taylor	
Osirion, Legacy of Pharaohs	January 2014	64	ISBN 978-1-60125-595-2	Paperback	PZO9265	Alex Greenshields, Amanda Hamon, Jonathan H. Keith, Ron Lundeen, David N. Ross	
Inner Sea Gods	April 2014	320	ISBN 978-1-60125-597-6	Hardcover	PZO9267	Sean K Reynolds	
Inner Sea Combat	May 2014	64	ISBN 978-1-60125-598-3	Softcover	PZO9268	Dennis Baker, Jesse Benner, John Compton, Thurston Hillman	
Occult Mysteries	May 2014	64	ISBN 978-1-60125-649-2	Softcover	PZO9269	Jason Bulmahn, Crystal Frasier, Jim Groves, Brandon Hodge, James Jacobs, Erik Mona, F. Wesley Schneider, Jerome Virnich	
Numeria, Land of Fallen Stars	June 2014	64	ISBN 978-1-60125-653-9	Softcover	PZO9270	Jim Groves, James Jacobs, Russ Taylor	
Technology Guide	August 2014	64	ISBN 978-1-60125-672-0	Softcover	PZO9272	James Jacobs, Russ Taylor	
Undead Unleashed	September 2014	64	ISBN 978-1-60125-677-5	Softcover	PZO9273	Adam Daigle, Dave Gross, Mark Moreland, David N. Ross, Amber Stewart, Jerome Virnich	
Ships of the Inner Sea	October 2014	64	ISBN 978-1-60125-702-4	Softcover	PZO9274	Benjamin Bruck, Paris Crenshaw, Amanda Hamon, Chris A. Jackson, Philip A. Lee, John Mangrum	
Lost Treasures	December 2014	64	ISBN 978-1-60125-703-1	Softcover	PZO9275	Judy Bauer, Savannah Broadway, John Compton, Ron Lundeen, Levi Miles, Justin Riddler, F. Wesley Schneider, Mike Shel, Christina Stiles, James L. Sutter, Jerome Virnich	
Belkzen, Hold of the Orc Hordes	February 2015	64	ISBN 978-1-60125-710-9	Softcover	PZO9276	Tyler Beck, Jason Garrett, Alex Greenshields, David Schwartz	
Tombs of Golarion	March 2015	64	ISBN 978-1-60125-720-8	Softcover	PZO9278	Scott Fernandez, Ron Lundeen, Larry Wilhelm	
Andoran, Birthplace of Freedom	May 2015	64	ISBN 978-1-60125-721-5	Softcover	PZO9279	Tim Hitchcock, Jason Nelson	
Inner Sea Monster Codex	June 2015	64	ISBN 978-1-60125-752-9	Softcover	PZO9283	John Compton, Paris Crenshaw, Mike Myler, Tork Shaw, Larry Wilhelm	
Hell Unleashed	July 2015	64	ISBN 978-1-60125-757-4	Softcover	PZO9281	F. Wesley Schneider, Jerome Virnich	
Occult Bestiary	September 2015	64	ISBN 978-1-60125-767-3	Softcover	PZO9284	Josh Colon, John Compton, Paris Crenshaw, Adam Daigle, Eleanor Ferron, James Jacobs, Joe Homes, Mikko Kallio, Mike Kimmel, Ron Lundeen, Kate Marshall, Kalervo Oikarinen, Stephen Radney-MacFarland, F. Wesley Schneider	
Inner Sea Races	September 2015	256	ISBN 978-1-60125-722-2	Hardcover	PZO9280	Ross Byers, John Compton, Adam Daigle, Crystal Frasier, Matthew Goodall, Alex Greenshields, James Jacobs, Amanda Hamon Kunz, Ron Lundeen, Rob McCreary, Jessica Price, David N. Ross, Owen K.C. Stephens, James L. Sutter, Russ Taylor, Jerome Virnich	
Distant Shores	October 2015	64	ISBN 978-1-60125-787-1	Softcover	PZO9285	John Compton, Adam Daigle, Crystal Frasier, Amanda Hamon, Rob McCreary, Mark Moreland, James L. Sutter, Owen K.C. Stephens	
Occult Realms	November 2015	64	ISBN 978-1-60125-794-9	Softcover	PZO9286	Robert Brookes, Thurston Hillman, Brandon Hodge, Thomas M. Reid, Mark Seifter	
Cheliax, The Infernal Empire	December 2015	64	ISBN 978-1-60125-799-4	Softcover	PZO9287	Amanda Hamon, Ron Lundeen, Mark Moreland	
Darklands Revisited	February 2016	64	ISBN 978-1-60125-819-9	Softcover	PZO9289	Thurston Hillman	
Inner Sea Faiths	March 2016	96	ISBN 978-1-60125-825-0	Softcover	PZO9290	Robert Brookes, Benjamin Bruck, Crystal Frasier, Thurston Hillman, Brandon Hodge, James Jacobs, Jessica Price, Patrick Renie, David N. Ross	
Heaven Unleashed	April 2016	64	ISBN 978-1-60125-828-1	Softcover	PZO9291	Judy Bauer, Crystal Frasier, Jim Groves, Amanda Hamon, Jenny Jarzabski, Jason Keeley, Luis Loza, Ron Lundeen, Jessica Price	
Inner Sea Intrigue	May 2016	64	ISBN 978-1-60125-837-3	Softcover	PZO9292	David N. Ross, Ross Byers	
Path of the Hellknight	June 2016	64	ISBN 978-1-60125-843-4	Softcover	PZO9293	F. Wesley Schneider	
Planes of Power	September 2016	64	ISBN 978-1-60125-883-0	Softcover	PZO9295	Eleanor Ferron, Jessica Price, John Compton, Paris Crenshaw, Thurston Hillman	
Inner Sea Temples	October 2016	64	ISBN 978-1-60125-893-9	Softcover	PZO9296	Robert Brookes, Liz Courts, Mikko Kallio, Jeffrey Swank, Larry Wilhelm	
Horror Realms	November 2016	64	978-1-60125-900-4	Softcover	PZO9297	Thurston Hillman, Tim Hitchcock, James Jacobs, Patrick Renie, David N. Ross, and Linda Zayas-Palmer	
The First World, Realm of the Fey	December 2016	64	978-1-60125-909-7	Softcover	PZO9298	James L. Sutter	
Qadira, Jewel of the East	January 2017	64	978-1-60125-912-7	Softcover	PZO9299	Jessica Price	
Lands of Conflict	February 2017	64	978-1-60125-927-1	Softcover	PZO92101	Lissa Guillet and Amber E. Scott	
Aquatic Adventures	June 2017	64	978-1-60125-944-8	Softcover	PZO92102	Amber E. Scott and Mark Seifter	
Taldor, the First Empire	December 2017	64	ISBN 978-1-60125-999-8	Softcover	PZO92105	Mark Moreland, with Crystal Frasier, Violet Hargrave, and Isabelle Lee	
Inner Sea Taverns	February 2018	64	978-1-64078-016-3	Softcover	PZO92107	Kate Baker, Eleanor Ferron, Michelle Jones, Jason Keeley, Luis Loza, Jacob W. Michaels, Joe Pasini, and David N. Ross	
Nidal, Land of Shadows	April 2018	64	978-1-64078-033-0	Softcover	PZO92108	Liane Merciel with Lyz Liddell, Ron Lundeen, and Mark Moreland	
Distant Realms	June 2018	64	978-1-64078-046-0	Softcover	PZO92109	John Compton, Crystal Frasier, Thurston Hillman, Amanda Hamon, Lyz Liddell, and David Schwartz	
Sandpoint, Light of the Lost Coast	October 2018	64	978-1-64078-080-4	Softcover	PZO92111	James Jacobs	
Construct Handbook	November 2018	64	978-1-60125-989-9	Softcover	PZO92104	Brian Duckwitz, Vanessa Hoskins, Nathan King, Kris Leonard, Luis Loza, Adrian Ng, Tom Phillips, Alex Riggs, and Nicholas Wasko	
Faiths of Golarion	December 2018	64	978-1-64078-099-6	Softcover	PZO92112	Kate Baker, John Compton, Adam Daigle, Crystal Frasier, Ron Lundeen, Liane Merciel, Michael Sayre, and Owen K.C. Stephens	
Concordance of Rivals	April 2019	64	978-1-64078-127-6	Softcover	PZO92114	John Compton, Crystal Frasier, Ron Lundeen, and Amber Stewart	
Druma, Profit and Prophecy	August 2019	64	978-1-64078-141-2	Softcover	PZO92116	John Compton and Thurston Hillman	

== Pathfinder Second Edition (PF2e) ==
=== Pathfinder Rulebooks (2e) ===
Title	Date	Pages	ISBN	Format	Code	Author(s)	Link
Core Rulebook	August 1, 2019	640	ISBN 978-1-64078-168-9	Hardcover	PZO2101	Jason Bulmahn, Logan Bonner, et al.	
Bestiary	August 1, 2019	360	ISBN 978-1-64078-170-2	Hardcover	PZO2102	Logan Bonner, Jason Bulmahn, Stephen Radney-MacFarland, Mark Seifter, et al.	
Gamemastery Guide	March 10, 2020	256	ISBN 978-1-64078-198-6	Hardcover	PZO2103	Jason Bulmahn, Logan Bonner, et al.	
Bestiary 2	June 16, 2020	320	ISBN 978-1-64078-223-5	Hardcover	PZO2104	Logan Bonner, Jason Bulmahn, Lyz Liddell, Stephen Radney-MacFarland, Mark Seifter, et al.	
Advanced Player's Guide	July 30, 2020	272	ISBN 978-1-64078-258-7	Hardcover	PZO2105	Logan Bonner, Lyz Liddell, Mark Seifter, et al.	
Pathfinder Beginner Box	November 11, 2020	176	ISBN 978-1-64078-284-6	Box Set	PZO2106	Logan Bonner, Jason Bulmahn, Lyz Liddell, Mark Seifter, et al.	
Bestiary 3	April 7, 2021	320	978-1-64078-312-6	Hardcover	PZO2107	Logan Bonner, Lyz Liddell, Mark Seifter, et al.	
Secrets of Magic	September 1, 2021	255	978-1-64078-345-4	Hardcover	PZO2108	Logan Bonner, Mark Seifter, et al.	
Guns & Gears	October 13, 2021	239	978-1-64078-369-0	Hardcover	PZO2109	Michael Sayre and Mark Seifter	
Book of the Dead	April 27, 2022	224	978-1-64078-401-7	Hardcover	PZO2110	Jason Bulmahn, Brian Bauman, Tineke Bolleman, et al.	
Dark Archive	July 27, 2022	224	978-1-64078-443-7	Hardcover	PZO2111	James Case, Mikhail Rekun, Mark Seifter, et al.	
Treasure Vault	February 22, 2023	224	978-1-64078-497-0	Hardcover	PZO2112	Michael Sayre, Mark Seifter, Kendra Leigh Speedling, et al.	
Rage of Elements	August 8, 2023	224	978-1-64078-527-4	Hardcover	PZO2113	Logan Bonner, Jason Bulmahn, James Case, et al.	
Player Core	November 15, 2023	463	978-1-64078-553-3	Hardcover	PZO12001	Logan Bonner, Jason Bulmahn, Stephen Radney-MacFarland, and Mark Seifter	
GM Core	November 15, 2023	335	978-1-64078-558-8	Hardcover	PZO12002	Logan Bonner and Mark Seifter	
Monster Core	March 27, 2024	372	978-1-64078-566-3	Hardcover	PZO12003	Logan Bonner, Jason Bulmahn, Stephen Radney-MacFarland, and Mark Seifter	
Howl of the Wild	May 22, 2024	224	978-1-64078-584-7	Hardcover	PZO12005	Kate Baker, Rigby Bendele, Chris Bissette, et al.	
Player Core 2	August 1, 2024	320	978-1-64078-5-977	Hardcover	PZO12004	Logan Bonner, Jason Bulmahn, Stephen Radney-MacFarland, and Mark Seifter	
War of Immortals	October 23, 2024	240	978-1-64078-619-6	Hardcover	PZO12006	James Case, Liane Merciel, and Michael Sayre	
Guns & Gears (Remastered)	February 2, 2025	256	978-1-64078-643-1	Hardcover	PZO12010	Michael Sayre, Mark Seifter, and Logan Bonner, et al.	
NPC Core	March 5, 2025	240	978-1-64078-649-3	Hardcover	PZO12007	Raychael Allor, Rigby Bendele, Joshua Birdson, et al	
Treasure Vault (Remastered)	June 4, 2025	224	978-1-64078-671-4	Hardcover	PZO12011	Michael Sayre, Mark Seifter, Kendra Leigh Speedling, et al	
Battlecry!	July 31, 2025	224	978-1-64078-691-2	Hardcover	PZO12008	Logan Bonner, Jason Keeley, and Michael Sayr	
Monster Core 2	November 5, 2025	376	978-1-64078-746-9	Hardcover	PZO12009	Alexander Augunas, Jesse Benner, Joshua Birdsong, et al	
Dark Archive (Remastered)	January 2026	224	978-1-64078-755-1	Hardcover	PZO12012	James Case, Mikhail Rekun, Mark Seifter, et al.	

=== Pathfinder Lost Omens (2e) books ===
The Pathfinder Lost Omens line details the established universe of the Pathfinder Roleplaying Game which is used for the official adventures released by Paizo. It details subjects ranging from its universe's pantheons to its nations.

Title	Date	Pages	ISBN	Format	Code	Author(s)	Link
World Guide	September 10, 2019	132	ISBN 978-1-64078-172-6	Hardcover	PZO9301	Tanya DePass, James Jacobs, et al.	
Character Guide	October 29, 2019	136	ISBN 978-1-64078-193-1	Hardcover	PZO9302	John Compton, Sasha Lindley Hall, et al.	
Gods & Magic	February 11, 2020	128	ISBN 978-1-64078-202-0	Hardcover	PZO9303	Robert Adducci	
Legends	July 30, 2020	127	ISBN 978-1-64078-254-9	Hardcover	PZO9306	Paizo Staff	
Pathfinder Society Guide	October 14, 2020	127	ISBN 978-1-64078-278-5	Hardcover	PZO9307	Kate Baker, James Case, John Compton, et al.	
Ancestry Guide	February 24, 2021	143	ISBN 978-1-64078-308-9	Hardcover	PZO9308	Calder CaDavid, James Case, Jessica Catalan, et al.	
The Mwangi Expanse	July 7, 2021	311	ISBN 978-1-64078-340-9	Hardcover	PZO9309	Laura-Shay Adams, Mariam Ahmad, Jahmal Brown, et al.	
The Grand Bazaar	October 13, 2021	135	ISBN 978-1-64078-362-1	Hardcover	PZO9310	Tineke Bolleman, Jesse Decker, Jessica Catalan, et al.	
Monsters of Myth	December 22, 2021	128	ISBN 978-1-64078-389-8	Hardcover	PZO9311	James Case, John Compton, Dana Ebert, et al.	
Absalom, City of Lost Omens	December 22, 2021	400	ISBN 978-1-64078-235-8	Hardcover	PZO9304	Allie Bustion, John Compton, Jeremy Corff, et al.	
Knights of Lastwall	May 27, 2022	128	ISBN 978-1-64078-413-0	Hardcover	PZO9312	Jessica Catalan, Banana Chan, Ryan Costello, et al.	
Travel Guide	September 13, 2022	128	ISBN 978-1-64078-465-9	Hardcover	PZO9313	Rigby Bendele, Dana Ebert, Dustin Knight, et al.	
Impossible Lands	November 29, 2022	334	ISBN 978-1-64078-480-2	Hardcover	PZO9314	Mariam Ahmad, Saif Ansari, Alexandria Bustion, et al.	
Firebrands	March 29, 2023	128	ISBN 978-1-64078-505-2	Hardcover	PZO9315	James Beck, Rigby Bendele, Jessica Catalan, et al.	
Highhelm	June 28, 2023	136	ISBN 978-1-64078-521-2	Hardcover	PZO9316	Dan Cascone, Caryn DiMarco, Dana Ebert, et al.	
Tian Xia World Guide	April 24, 2024	304	ISBN 978-1-64078-576-2	Hardcover	PZO13001	Eren Ahn, Jeremy Blum, Alyx Bui, et al.	
Tian Xia Character Guide	August 28, 2024	136	ISBN 978-1-64078-579-3	Hardcover	PZO13002	Eren Ahn, Jeremy Blum, Logan Bonner, et al.	
Divine Mysteries	December 3, 2024	320	ISBN 978-1-64078-624-0	Hardcover	PZO13003	Misha Bushyager, Jessica Catalan, Carlos Cisco, et al.	
Rival Academies	March 5, 2025	128	ISBN 978-1-64078-652-3	Hardcover	PZO13004	Sharang Biswas, Jeremy Blum, Carlos Cisco, et al.	
Shining Kingdoms	June 4, 2025	192	ISBN 978-1-64078-676-9	Hardcover	PZO13005	Dan Cascone, Caryn DiMarco, Sen H.H.S., et al.	
Draconic Codex	November 5, 2025	224	ISBN 978-1-64078-749-0	Hardcover	PZO13007	Joshua Birdsong, Chris Bissette, Jeremy Blum, et al.	

=== Pathfinder Adventure (2e) books ===
Title	Date	Pages	ISBN	Format	Code	Author(s)	Link
The Fall of Plaguestone	August 1, 2019	64	ISBN 978-1-64078-174-0	Softcover	PZO9555	Jason Bulmahn	
Little Trouble in Big Absalom	July 25, 2020	16	None	Softcover	PZO9500-18	Eleanor Ferron	
The Slithering	July 30, 2020	64	ISBN 978-1-64078-272-3	Softcover	PZO9557	Ron Lundeen	
Troubles in Otari	December 9, 2020	64	ISBN 978-1-64078-286-0	Softcover	PZO9558	Jason Keeley, Liz Lydell & Ron Lundeen	
Malevolence	July 7, 2021	64	ISBN 978-1-64078-315-7	Softcover	PZO9559	James Jacobs	
Night of the Gray Death	October 13, 2021	72	ISBN 978-1-64078-372-0	Softcover	PZO9560	Ron Lundeen	
Threshold of Knowledge	October 17, 2021	16	None	Softcover	PZO9500-20	Jabari Weathers	
Shadows at Sundown	May 5, 2022	64	ISBN 978-1-64078-421-5	Softcover	PZO9561	Landon Winkler	
A Fistful of Flowers	June 25, 2022	16	None	Softcover	PZO9500-22	Eleanor Ferron and Linda Zayas-Palmer	
Crown of the Kobold King Anniversary Edition	October 26, 2022	128	ISBN 978-1-64078-452-9	Hardcover	PZO9562	Jason Bulmahn, Tim Hitchcock, Nicholas Logue, F. Wesley Schneider	
The Enmity Cycle	May 26, 2023	64	ISBN 978-1-64078-516-8	Softcover	PZO9563	Brian Duckwitz	
Rusthenge	October 18, 2023	64	ISBN 978-1-64078-542-7	Softcover	PZO9564	Vanessa Hoskins	
Prey for Death	July 2024	128	ISBN 978-1-64078-600-4	Hardcover	PZO14002	Vanessa Hoskins	
Claws of the Tyrant	April 2025	128	ISBN 978-1-64078-656-1	Hardcover	PZO14003	Alexander Augunas, Rigby Bendele, Erin Roberts	

=== Pathfinder Adventure Path (2e) books ===
Title	Date	Pages	ISBN	Format	Code	Author(s)	Link
Age of Ashes #1: Hellknight Hill	August 1, 2019	96	ISBN 978-1-64078-173-3	Softcover	PZO90145	Amanda Hamon	
Age of Ashes #2: Cult of Cinders	September 10, 2019	96	ISBN 978-1-64078-188-7	Softcover	PZO90146	Eleanor Ferron	
Age of Ashes #3: Tomorrow Must Burn	October 1, 2019	96	ISBN 978-1-64078-191-7	Softcover	PZO90147	Ron Lundeen	
Age of Ashes #4: Fires of the Haunted City	October 29, 2019	96	ISBN 978-1-64078-192-4	Softcover	PZO90148	Linda Zayas-Palmer	
Age of Ashes #5: Against the Scarlet Triad	November 26, 2019	96	ISBN 978-1-64078-194-8	Softcover	PZO90149	John Compton	
Age of Ashes #6: Broken Promises	December 24, 2019	96	ISBN 978-1-64078-195-5	Softcover	PZO90150	Luis Loza	
Extinction Curse #1: The Show Must Go On	February 11, 2020	96	ISBN 978-1-64078-201-3	Softcover	PZO90151	Jason Tondro	
Extinction Curse #2: Legacy of the Lost God	March 10, 2020	96	ISBN 978-1-64078-209-9	Softcover	PZO90152	Jenny Jarzabski	
Extinction Curse #3: Life’s Long Shadows	April 7, 2020	96	ISBN 978-1-64078-216-7	Softcover	PZO90153	Greg A. Vaughan	
Extinction Curse #4: Siege of the Dinosaurs	May 2, 2020	96	ISBN 978-1-64078-226-6	Softcover	PZO90154	Kate Baker	
Extinction Curse #5: Lord of the Black Sands	May 27, 2020	96	ISBN 978-1-64078-234-1	Softcover	PZO90155	Mikko Kallio	
Extinction Curse #6: The Apocalypse Prophet	June 28, 2020	96	ISBN 978-1-64078-241-9	Softcover	PZO90156	Lyz Liddell	
Agents of Edgewatch #1: Devil at the Dreaming Palace	July 30, 2020	96	ISBN 978-1-64078-253-2	Softcover	PZO90157	James L. Sutter	
Agents of Edgewatch #2: Sixty Feet Under	August 26, 2020	96	ISBN 978-1-64078-263-1	Softcover	PZO90158	Michael Sayre	
Agents of Edgewatch #3: All or Nothing	September 16, 2020	96	ISBN 978-1-64078-268-6	Softcover	PZO90159	Jason Keely	
Agents of Edgewatch #4: Assault on Hunting Lodge Seven	October 14, 2020	96	ISBN 978-1-64078-277-8	Softcover	PZO90160	Ron Lundeen	
Agents of Edgewatch #5: Belly of the Black Whale	November 11, 2020	96	ISBN 978-1-64078-287-7	Softcover	PZO90161	Cole Kronwitter	
Agents of Edgewatch #6: Ruins of the Radiant Siege	December 9, 2020	96	ISBN 978-1-64078-294-5	Softcover	PZO90162	Amber Stewart	
Abomination Vaults #1: Ruins of Gauntlight	January 27, 2021	96	ISBN 978-1-64078-301-0	Softcover	PZO90163	James Jacobs	
Abomination Vaults #2: Hands of the Devil	February 24, 2021	96	ISBN 978-1-64078-307-2	Softcover	PZO90164	Vanessa Hoskins	
Abomination Vaults #3: Eyes of the Empty Death	April 7, 2021	96	ISBN 978-1-64078-316-4	Softcover	PZO90165	Stephen Radney-MacFarland	
Abomination Vaults	May 10, 2022	256	ISBN 978-1-64078-410-9	Hardcover	PZO2033	Vanessa Hoskins, James Jacobs, and Stephen Radney-MacFarland	
Fists of the Ruby Phoenix #1: Despair on Danger Island	July 7, 2021	96	ISBN 978-1-64078-329-4	Softcover	PZO90166	Luis Loza	
Fists of the Ruby Phoenix #2: Ready? Fight!	July 7, 2021	96	ISBN 978-1-64078-333-1	Softcover	PZO90167	David N. Ross	
Fists of the Ruby Phoenix #3: King of the Mountain	July 7, 2021	96	ISBN 978-1-64078-339-3	Softcover	PZO90168	James Case	
Strength of Thousands #1: Kindled Magic	August 4, 2021	96	ISBN 978-1-64078-349-2	Softcover	PZO90169	Alexandria Bustion and Eleanor Ferron	
Strength of Thousands #2: Spoken on the Song Wind	September 1, 2021	96	ISBN 978-1-64078-356-0	Softcover	PZO90170	Quinn Murphy	
Strength of Thousands #3: Hurricane's Howl	October 13, 2021	96	ISBN 978-1-64078-361-4	Softcover	PZO90171	Michelle Jones	
Strength of Thousands #4: Secrets of the Temple-City	October 13, 2021	96	ISBN 978-1-64078-375-1	Softcover	PZO90172	Luis Loza	
Strength of Thousands #5: Doorway to the Red Star	November 10, 2021	96	ISBN 978-1-64078-382-9	Softcover	PZO90173	Michael Sayre	
Strength of Thousands #6: Shadows of the Ancients	March 30, 2022	96	ISBN 978-1-64078-388-1	Softcover	PZO90174	Saif Ansari	
Quest for the Frozen Flame #1: Broken Tusk Moon	January 26, 2022	96	ISBN 978-1-64078-393-5	Softcover	PZO90175	Ron Lundeen and Stephanie Lundeen	
Quest for the Frozen Flame #2: Lost Mammoth Valley	February 23, 2022	96	ISBN 978-1-64078-396-6	Softcover	PZO90176	Jessica Catalan	
Quest for the Frozen Flame #3: Burning Tundra	March 30, 2022	96	ISBN 978-1-64078-406-2	Softcover	PZO90177	Jason Tondro	
Outlaws of Alkenstar #1: Punks in a Powderkeg	April 27, 2022	96	ISBN 978-1-64078-412-3	Softcover	PZO90178	Vanessa Hoskins	
Outlaws of Alkenstar #2: Cradle of Quartz	May 25, 2022	96	ISBN 978-1-64078-422-2	Softcover	PZO90179	Scott D. Young	
Outlaws of Alkenstar #3: The Smoking Gun	June 29, 2022	96	ISBN 978-1-64078-427-7	Softcover	PZO90180	Cole Kronewitter	
Blood Lords #1: Zombie Feast	July 27, 2022	96	ISBN 978-1-64078-446-8	Softcover	PZO90181	Mike Kimmel	
Blood Lords #2: Graveclaw	August 24, 2022	96	ISBN 978-1-64078-453-6	Softcover	PZO90182	Jason Tondro	
Blood Lords #3: Field of Maidens	September 21, 2022	96	ISBN 978-1-64078-462-8	Softcover	PZO90183	Jenny Jarzabski	
Kingmaker	September 21, 2022	640	ISBN 978-1-64078-429-1	Hardcover	PZO2020	Tim Hitchcock, Robert G. McCreary, Greg A. Vaughan, Neil Spicer, Jason Nelson, Richard Pett, et al.	
Blood Lords #4: The Ghouls Hunger	October 26, 2022	96	ISBN 978-1-64078-467-3	Softcover	PZO90184	Leo Glass	
Blood Lords #5: A Taste of Ashes	November 16, 2022	96	ISBN 978-1-64078-479-6	Softcover	PZO90185	Brian Duckwitz	
Blood Lords #6: Ghost King's Rage	December 14, 2022	96	ISBN 978-1-64078-484-0	Softcover	PZO90186	Jessica Catalan	
Gatewalkers #1: The Seventh Arch	January 25, 2023	96	ISBN 978-1-64078-492-5	Softcover	PZO90187	James L. Sutter	
Gatewalkers #2: They Watched the Stars	February 22, 2023	96	ISBN 978-1-64078-499-4	Softcover	PZO90188	Jason Keeley	
Gatewalkers #3: Dreamers of the Nameless Spires	March 29, 2023	96	ISBN 978-1-64078-504-5	Softcover	PZO90189	James Jacobs	
Stolen Fate #1: The Choosing	April 26, 2023	96	ISBN 978-1-64078-511-3	Softcover	PZO90190	Ron Lundeen	
Stolen Fate #2: The Destiny War	May 24, 2023	96	ISBN 978-1-64078-517-5	Softcover	PZO90191	Chris S. Sims	
Stolen Fate #3: Worst of All Possible Worlds	June 28, 2023	96	ISBN 978-1-64078-520-5	Softcover	PZO90192	Luis Loza	
Sky King’s Tomb #1: Mantle of Gold	August 2, 2023	96	ISBN 978-1-64078-530-4	Softcover	PZO90193	John Compton, Crystal Frasier, and Caryn DiMarco	
Sky King’s Tomb #2: Cult of the Cave Worm	August 30, 2023	96	ISBN 978-1-64078-534-2	Softcover	PZO90194	Scott D. Young	
Sky King’s Tomb #3: Heavy is the Crown	September 20, 2023	96	ISBN 978-1-64078-538-0	Softcover	PZO90195	Jessica Catalan	
Season of Ghosts #1: The Summer That Never Was	October 18, 2023	96	ISBN 978-1-64078-544-1	Softcover	PZO90196	Sen H.H.S. and James Jacobs	
Season of Ghosts #2: Let the Leaves Fall	November 15, 2023	96	ISBN 978-1-64078-549-6	Softcover	PZO90197	Joan Hong with Grady Wang and Tan Shao Han	
Season of Ghosts #3: No Breath to Cry	December 13, 2023	96	ISBN 978-1-64078-551-9	Softcover	PZO90198	Dan Cascone and Eleanor Ferron, with Jeremy Blum, Dana Ebert, Joshua Kim, and Michelle Y. Kim	
Season of Ghosts #4: To Bloom Below the Web	January 31, 2024	96	ISBN 978-1-64078-562-5	Softcover	PZO90199	Liane Merciel, with Jeremy Blum, Michelle Kim, and Joshua Kim	
Seven Dooms for Sandpoint	March 27, 2024	200	ISBN 978-1-64078-570-0	Softcover	PZO90200	James Jacobs	
Wardens of Wildwood #1: Pactbreaker	April 24, 2024	96	ISBN 978-1-64078-575-5	Softcover	PZO15201	Andrew White	
Wardens of Wildwood #2: Severed at the Root	May 22, 2024	96	ISBN 978-1-64078-587-8	Softcover	PZO15202	Jessica Catalan	
Wardens of Wildwood #3: Shepherd of Decay	June 26, 2024	96	ISBN 978-1-64078-592-2	Softcover	PZO15203	Mike Kimmel	
Curtain Call #1: Stage Fright	July 2024	96	ISBN 978-1-64078-602-8	Softcover	PZO15204	Richard Pett	
Curtain Call #2: Singer, Stalker, Skinsaw Man	August 2024	96	ISBN 978-1-64078-606-6	Softcover	PZO15205	Kendra Leigh Speedling	
Curtain Call #3: Bring the House Down	September 2024	96	ISBN 978-1-64078-609-7	Softcover	PZO15206	Sen H. H. S.	
Triumph of the Tusk #1: The Resurrection Flood	October 2024	96	ISBN 978-1-64078-618-9	Softcover	PZO15207	Brian Duckwitz	
Triumph of the Tusk #2: Hoof, Cinder, and Storm	December 2024	96	ISBN 978-1-64078-632-5	Softcover	PZO15208	David Schwartz, Shay Snow	
Triumph of the Tusk #3: Destroyer’s Doom	December 2024	96	ISBN 978-1-64078-634-9	Softcover	PZO15209	Kendra Leigh Speedling	
Spore War #1: Whispers in the Dirt	January 2025	96	ISBN 978-1-64078-639-4	Softcover	PZO15210	Jason Bulmahn	
Spore War #2: The Secret of Deathstalk Tower	February 2025	96	ISBN 978-1-64078-646-2	Softcover	PZO15211	James Jacobs	
Spore War #3: A Voice in the Blight	March 2025	96	ISBN 978-1-64078-651-6	Softcover	PZO15212	Rigby Bendele	
Shades of Blood #1: Thirst for Blood	April 2025	96	ISBN 978-1-64078-658-5	Softcover	PZO15213	Luis Loza, Jim Groves	
Shades of Blood #2: The Broken Palace	May 2025	96	ISBN 978-1-64078-668-4	Softcover	PZO15214	James Jacobs	
Shades of Blood #3: To Blot Out the Sun	June 2025	96	ISBN 978-1-64078-675-2	Softcover	PZO15215	Jessica Catalan	
Hellbreakers	March 2026	256	ISBN 978-1-64078-769-8	Hardcover	PZO15222	Sen H.H.S., Jason Keeley, and Jacob W. Michaels	
