= Pathfinder Roleplaying Game Bestiary =

Fantasy role-playing game supplement

- Cover art by Wayne Reynolds
- Designers: Jason Bulmahn; Brian Cortijo; Adam Daigle; Michael Ferguson; Joshua Frost; James Jacobs; Robert McCreary; Erik Mona; Sean K. Reynolds; Wesley Schneider; Lisa Stevens; James L. Sutter; Greg A. Vaughan
- Illustrators: Wayne Reynolds; David Allsop; Peter Bergting; Matthew Cavotta; Matthew Dixon; Jesper Ejsing; Jason A. Engle; Jon Hodgson; Andrew Hou; Michael Jaecks; Eric M. Lofgren; Warren Mahy; Christian Pearce; Drew Pocza; Scott Purdy; Alex Shim; Dean Spencer; Francis Tsai; Adam Vehige; Tyler Walpole; Eva Widermann; Benjamin C. Wootten; Kevin Yan; Kieran J. Yanner; Ilker Serdar Yildiz
- Publishers: Paizo
- Publication: 2009
- Genres: Fantasy

Pathfinder Roleplaying Game Bestiary is a supplement published by Paizo in 2009 for the fantasy role-playing game Pathfinder that contains the descriptions and game statistics for hundreds of creatures.

== Contents ==
Pathfinder Roleplaying Game Bestiary features a compendium of more than 350 creatures, allies, variants, and creation rules that equip gamemasters with the tools necessary to build encounters, worlds, and foes. Although all the creatures are compatible with the third edition of Dungeons & Dragons published by Wizards of the Coast (WotC), and many are identical to creatures found in WotC's Monster Manual, the Bestiary does not contain creatures that are copyrighted by WotC such as the beholder, mind flayer and yuan-ti.

The book also contains several appendices:

- Building a monster
- Evolution of monsters
- Glossary
- Monstrous player characters
- Gifts for monsters
- Monstrous companions
- Monsters by type
- Monsters by natural environment
- Monster variants
- Special abilities
- The role of monsters

== Publication history ==
When Wizards of the Coast (WotC) announced in 2000 that their 3rd edition of D&D would be covered by the Open Game License (OGL), Paizo was one of many third-party publishers that began producing D&D compatible material. However in 2008, when WotC announced that the 4th edition of D&D would not be covered by the OGL, 3rd-party publishers like Paizo were left with warehouses full of 3rd edition publications that were no longer needed, and no means to create 4th edition-compatible material. Rather than go out of business, Paizo instead created Pathfinder, a fantasy role-playing game compatible with the 3rd edition of D&D, and still covered by the OGL. After publishing a Core Rulebook, Paizo published the Pathfinder Bestiary in 2009, a 328-page hardcover book designed by Jason Bulmahn, Brian Cortijo, Adam Daigle, Michael Ferguson, Joshua Frost, James Jacobs, Robert McCreary, Erik Mona, Sean K. Reynolds, Wesley Schneider , Lisa Stevens, James L. Sutter, and Greg A. Vaughan, with cover art by Wayne Reynolds, and interior art by David Allsop , Peter Bergting, Matthew Cavotta, Matthew Dixon , Jesper Ejsing, Jason A. Engle, Jon Hodgson, Andrew Hou , Michael Jaecks, Eric M. Lofgren, Warren Mahy, Christian Pearce, Drew Pocza, Scott Purdy, Alex Shim, Dean Spencer, Francis Tsai, Adam Vehige, Tyler Walpole, Eva Widermann, Benjamin C. Wootten, Kevin Yan, Kieran J. Yanner, and Ilker Serdar Yildiz.

In 2010, Black Book Editions published a licensed French edition, Bestiaire, that had been translated by Damien Coltice, Christophe Leclerc, and Aurélie Pesseas.

== Reception ==
In the April 2010 issue of Realms of Fantasy, Matt Staggs liked the new treatment of some of the monsters, noting, "Imaginative flourishes ... are common in the Bestiary, and prove that a monster is far more than just a string of numbers." Staggs concluded, "The Bestiary is an excellent product, a worthy companion volume to the Pathfinder Roleplaying Game Core Rulebook that manages to supply gamemasters with classic creatures in a fresh, new way."

Writing for Black Gate, Scott Taylor noted "This tome has all the usual suspects you'd imagine from a beginning monster supplement: orcs, trolls, goblins, giants, dragons, etc. These are all found in here and are well portrayed with fantastic art by 24 artists and 3 art studios." Taylor also liked the "monster quote system", writing, "No, that isn’t to say that the monsters are talking, but after each critter is introduced, there is a brief description that helps define it for the reader." Taylor concluded, "I know the question some of you must be asking after having read this… 'Do I really need [this book]? To me the better question is 'Why would you think you didn't need [it]?' Seriously, if you're into adventure, and you want to use every possible source you can to make each day at the gaming table special, then [this book is] a must have. [It is] thoughtful, well presented, and will help Game Masters and players alike imagine the kind of trials they face with each new rolling of the dice."

== Awards ==
At the 2010 ENnie Awards, Pathfinder Bestiary won Gold in the categories "Best Cover Art" and "Best Monster or Adversary".
