= Rise of the Runelords =

- cover of the first issue of the Adventure Path
- Designers: James Jacobs et al.
- Publishers: Paizo
- Publication: August 2007 – January 2008
- Genres: Tabletop role-playing game adventure path
- Systems: Pathfinder Roleplaying Game
- Series: Pathfinder Adventure Path

Rise of the Runelords is a six-part Adventure Path published by Paizo beginning in August 2007, originally for the revised third edition of Dungeons & Dragons as the first publication in the Pathfinder periodical line. In 2012, Paizo published a collected Anniversary Edition revised for the first edition of the Pathfinder Roleplaying Game.

== Volumes ==
Burnt Offerings written by James Jacobs, is the first volume in the Adventure Path. The story begins when a festival in the town of Sandpoint is interrupted by a disaster. Rumours regarding monsters nearby disturb the populace. In the 2008 ENnie Awards, the adventure received Gold awards for Best Adventure and Best Cover Art, and Silver award for Best Interior Art.

The Skinsaw Murders written by Richard Pett is the second module. Player characters investigate string of murders, which leads them to a haunted house. The killer is a part of a group known as the Skinsaw Men.

Hook Mountain Massacre written by Nicolas Logue is the third module.

Fortress of the Stone Giants written by Wolfgang Baur is the fourth module.

Sins of the Saviors written by Stephen S. Greer is the fifth module.

Spires of Xin-Shalast, written by Greg A. Vaughan, is the sixth and last volume in the Adventure Path.

== Reception ==
Scott Taylor of Black Gate in 2015 rated the Rise of the Runelords series as #4 in "The Top 10 Campaign Adventure Module Series of All Time, saying "The series [...] is like wading into a fantasy novel pool and seeing how it changes around the ripples of your character's involvement."

CBR reviewer John Curtin ranked Rise of the Runelords as "a can't-miss Pathfinder experience", that deserves 2nd edition reprint.
