= Red Hand of Doom =

D&D adventure module

- Code: 953857400
- Rules required: 3rd Edition D&D
- Character levels: (6-12) starting at 6th
- Campaign setting: Generic D&D
- Authors: James Jacobs and Richard Baker
- First published: 2006

Red Hand of Doom is a 128-page adventure module for the 3.5 version of Dungeons & Dragons (D&D). It is designed as a generic D&D adventure that can be dropped into any campaign world, including a personal one. Instructions are given in the first pages of the module on where to place it in the worlds of Greyhawk, the Forgotten Realms, and Eberron (the three primary campaign settings of D&D at the time of release).

The adventure was indicated as appropriate for characters of experience levels six to twelve, but the designers have stated that it is targeted to levels five to eleven. It is also the first Wizards of the Coast Dungeons & Dragons adventure to make significant use of designer notes. The adventure is expected to take players weeks, or even months, to complete.

== Plot ==
Red Hand of Doom follows a group of adventurers who have entered the Elsir Vale, a thinly populated frontier region. The party discovers a massive hobgoblin horde that is fanatically devoted to the dark goddess Tiamat and led by the charismatic half-dragon warlord Azarr Kul. To stop the horde, players have to muster the inhabitants of the Vale, battle hobgoblins, giants, and dragons, and defeat an overwhelming enemy.

== Publication history ==
Red Hand of Doom was the first Dungeons & Dragons adventure to include Designer Notes—asides written by the authors to provide additional advice to players and to explain decisions made during the design process, as well as incorporating downloadable content in the form of PDF stat blocks.

The authors regarded the adventure as being self-contained and did not intend to continue the story in later publications. The first Dungeon Adventure Path for 4th Edition, Scales of War, does start off in the same location, reusing the maps from Red Hand of Doom, but only uses the location as a jumping-off point and does not build on specific plot points from Red Hand of Doom.

== Critical reception ==
The publication has been generally well received, with reviewers rating it as one of the best adventures in many years. In terms of content and quality, one reviewer compared it favorably with both The Temple of Elemental Evil and The Keep on the Borderlands. The inclusion of the Designer Notes was well regarded by critics, as was the provision of downloadable content. The artwork featured throughout the publication received special attention, with Howard Jones describing it as "fabulous".

The generic nature of the campaign was seen as both a strength and a limitation. While it permitted the material to be inserted into existing campaigns and game worlds, it was acknowledged that doing so might be a difficult task, and that the publication lacked sufficient information for such a task, especially for non-standard campaigns.

Dungeon Master for Dummies lists Red Hand of Doom as one of the ten best 3rd edition adventures.

TheGamer in 2022 ranked it as #3 on their list of "The Best 3.5 Edition Adventures".
