= Jessica Price =

American writer and designer of video and tabletop games

Jessica Price is an American writer, editor, designer as well as producer of both video games and tabletop games; she is known for her work on the Pathfinder Roleplaying Game and Guild Wars 2. She is also known for speaking about sexism in the gaming industry.

== Career ==
Price worked as an editor at Microsoft Studios before she joined Paizo as a project manager in 2013. She has since contributed creatively to such Pathfinder products as Inner Sea Races and Planes of Power. Price was also a designer on the Starfinder Core Rulebook for the Starfinder Roleplaying Game.

In 2016, Price was announced as a Gen Con Industry Insider Featured Presenter. After noting that the previous year's Gen Con included the panel "Writing Women Friendly Comics" during which some women walked out in response to a controversial moderator, Price felt that her appearance as a speaker would give an opportunity to change things for women in the gaming industry. In 2017, Price was again announced as a Gen Con Industry Insider Featured Presenter for Gen Con 50.

In 2018, Price was a narrative designer on Guild Wars 2 for ArenaNet. Price has been a writer for Dungeons & Dragons on sourcebooks such as Mythic Odysseys of Theros (2020) and Van Richten's Guide to Ravenloft (2021).

== Views on video game industry ==
Price has been a notable speaker on sexism in the broader gaming industry. In a 2013 interview on respect and sexism in the industry, Price said:

Some of it's unintentional. Male programmers will be shocked by the idea of making the default avatar female for a game intended primarily for female audiences. Marketers will think that making a console pink will magically fix its branding problems with women. Studios making games intended for kids and moms will refuse to give a successful female game designer an interview because she's never done a first-person shooter. [...] But some of it's very intentional. I've had every inch of my anatomy commented on by coworkers. I've had marketing guys propose that our marketing should consist of me putting on a low-cut top and talking about our product. I've had people insist that I must have slept with someone to get into the industry. [...] I've been sexually harassed, and had the people I went to for help tell me I must enjoy the attention, instruct me to deal with it because they didn't want to fire the guy, and warn me not to go to HR because I'd get fired for being a troublemaker. One guy had a history of violence, and clenched his fists and came close to taking a swing at me when I told him he had to stop touching me and talking about my breasts. The response from my chain of command was still, basically, "Deal with it yourself."

Katie Mettler, for the Washington Post, reported that for the first time there would be more female than male speakers at 2016 Gen Con. At the event, Price said "We can change things. It doesn't have to be glacial change. It can be immediate. [...] When it's half women, the pressure to be a woman in games is off. You can just be a person who works in games".

Tim Mulkerin, for Mic, interviewed Price in 2017 on why video game developers need to release diversity reports. On that topic, Price said "numbers don't always tell the whole story. [...] Even if video game developers did publish a diversity report ... it depends where the women are. [...] And for any woman who actually is in the creative or production side, you're still likely to be the only woman on the team, the only woman in the room". Mulkerin wrote that "for example, if a company is 40% women — an optimistic stretch — but they all work in low-level admin positions and the executive boards are all still predominantly male, that company is still failing at diversity and inclusion".

== Firing controversy ==
On July 5, 2018, ArenaNet founder Mike O'Brien announced that two game developers, Price and Peter Fries, had been fired from the company following a heated Twitter exchange with a community member. Megan Farokhmanesh, for Verge, reported that "on July 3rd, narrative designer Price tweeted a 29-tweet thread dissecting the challenges of writing player characters in an MMORPG. A streamer who goes by the name Deroir responded, 'Really interesting thread to read! However, allow me to disagree slightly,' and shared a three-tweet explanation of how narrative design influences player expression in the sort of games that Price narratively designs. Price both replied directly to Deroir, tweeting 'thanks for trying to tell me what we do internally, my dude,' and retweeted his response with the caption 'today in being a female game dev'". Price stated she would block "the next rando asshat" who tried to explain her job.

After O'Brien released a statement saying that Price's and Fries' "attacks on the community" were "unacceptable", Price spoke with Polygon and said "let's be clear: In 2018, it's absurd to pretend ignorance of what would happen to a woman fired for speaking about sexism, because he feels she got too uppity. [O'Brien] painted a target on everyone's back. He didn't just fail Peter and me, or even the employees for which he was responsible. He failed the entire industry. He caved to a handful of people and an army of bots and sock puppets," she added. "Now he's got almost every female developer I know — as well as some men — furious with him. I've got recruiters pinging me promising they'll steer candidates away from ArenaNet, and game design professors saying they're going to warn their students away. I've also had a lot of ArenaNet co-workers and other industry colleagues contacting me to express how afraid this has made them. [...] Peter stepped in to point out that his experience as a male dev was different. He stated pretty simple facts. I had no idea he was going to step in. I adore him; he was doing the right thing, and he deserves none of this crap".

Reactions to their firing and the subsequent statements from ArenaNet led to a mixed reaction from fans and others inside the industry. Nathan Grayson, for Kotaku, reported that there was an uptick in online harassment of female developers after Price's firing and that backlash to Price originated in Gamergate forums. Farokhmanesh wrote that "ArenaNet's swift action to fire both Price and Fries sends a disturbing message to its fans, and especially its most toxic ones: that their power is directly correlated to how loud they yell. It's a worrying precedent for anyone interested in working for ArenaNet, but especially those in marginalized communities that are more likely to face blowback and harassment from the worst parts of its fanbase".

== Works ==
Title	Game	Credits	Year	ISBN
Strategy Guide	Pathfinder Roleplaying Game (1st Edition)	Designer, Production Staff	2014	978-1601256263
Inner Sea Races	Pathfinder Roleplaying Game (1st Edition)	Designer	2015	978-1601257222
Planes of Power	Pathfinder Roleplaying Game (1st Edition)	Designer	2016	978-1601258830
Inner Sea Faiths	Pathfinder Roleplaying Game (1st Edition)	Designer	2016	978-1601258250
Heaven Unleashed	Pathfinder Roleplaying Game (1st Edition)	Designer	2016	978-1601258281
Was Ewig Liegt: Sonderband	Pathfinder Roleplaying Game (1st Edition)	Designer	2017	
Starfinder Core Rulebook	Starfinder Roleplaying Game	Designer	2017	978-1601259561
Qadira: Jewel of the East	Pathfinder Roleplaying Game (1st Edition)	Designer	2017	978-1601259127
Adventurer's Guide	Pathfinder Roleplaying Game (1st Edition)	Designer	2017	978-1601259387
Planar Adventures	Pathfinder Roleplaying Game (1st Edition)	Designer	2018	978-1640780446
Guild Wars 2	Guild Wars 2	Narrative Designer	2018	N/A
Mythic Odysseys of Theros	Dungeons & Dragons (5th Edition)	Writer	2020	978-0-7869-6701-8
Van Richten's Guide to Ravenloft	Dungeons & Dragons (5th Edition)	Writer	2021	978-0786967254
