= The Shackled City Adventure Path =

Dungeons & Dragons role-playing game Adventure Path

The Shackled City
- Front cover of the collected edition, illustrated by Matt Cavotta
- Code: SCAP
- Rules required: D&D 3rd Edition (original series), D&D v3.5 (collected edition)
- Character levels: 1–20
- Campaign setting: Generic Dungeons & Dragons (Greyhawk)
- Authors: Jesse Decker, James Jacobs, Tito Leati, David Noonan, Christopher Perkins, Chris Thomasson
- First published: March 2003 – November 2004 (original series), August 2007 (collected edition)
- ISBN: 978-0-9770071-0-3

The Shackled City Adventure Path (or simply Shackled City) is a role-playing game Adventure Path designed for Dungeons & Dragons (D&D), originally appearing as a series of modules in Dungeon magazine, and later collected in a hardcover edition collecting all previous installments plus an additional chapter written especially for the book release. Various elements of the game were revised for the collection; the setting was enlarged to better suit the needs of a typical high-level game.

== Campaign information ==
=== Location ===
Shackled City is primarily set in the city of Cauldron. Cauldron itself is nominally located in the World of Greyhawk, although the series is designed to be easily adapted to other D&D campaign settings.

=== Shackled City's impact on Cauldron ===
The Adventure Paths were widely lauded throughout the gaming industry, and the collected issues of Shackled City, including extensive background and location notes on Cauldron and its residents, were nominated for and received multiple ENnies in 2006.

== Purpose ==
The adventures are designed to begin with first level characters and to end with characters at or near twentieth level, taking them through twelve distinct adventures that span basic dungeon crawls, urban adventures, political intrigue, and even extra-planar excursions.

== Summary ==
The Adventure Path consists of the following scenarios:

Chapter	Title	Author	Illustrators	Levels	Issue	Date
1	"Life's Bazaar"	Christopher Perkins	Chuck Lukacs, Val Mayerik, Christopher West (cartography for entire series)	1–3	97	March 2003
The player characters investigate recent kidnappings. The trail leads to a slaver operating from Underdark passages below the city.
2	"Drakthar's Way"	Christopher Perkins	Omar Dogan	3–4	NA	August 2007
Small bands of goblins raid and vandalize the city. The player characters track the goblins to a hideout in a series of caves below the city that lead out the side of the mountain. The goblins are led by a vampiric bugbear, the eponymous Drakthar.
3	"Flood Season"	James Jacobs	Peter Bergting, Stephen A. Daniele, Scott Fischer	4–6	98	May 2003
In this adventure the city of Cauldron is threatened by flooding during the rainy season. Magical wands of "control water" normally used to control the flooding are stolen and taken to a lair below the city. The player characters presumably track down and recover the stolen wands.
4	"Zenith Trajectory"	David Noonan	Thomas M. Baxa, Jeff Carlisle, Mark Jackson, Mark Nelson	6–8	102	September 2003
The player characters are asked to rescue Zenith Splintershield, a dwarf who has been missing since heading into the Underdark to fight evil. Zenith has gone insane and is treated as prophet by the kuo-toa who captured him.
5	"The Demonskar Legacy"	Tito Leati	Jeff Carlisle, Matt Cavotta	8–10	104	November 2003
In this chapter, the heroes must find a missing paladin to stop an incursion by Cauldron to nearby Redgorge. After retracing his steps through a jungle, a giant-controlled cavern, and an otherworldly maze, they must face the demonic architect of the area's strife.
6	"Test of the Smoking Eye"	David Noonan	Mark Nelson, UDON	10–12	107	February 2004
Following their warning from a dying paladin to "seek the sign of the smoking eye", a mysterious plane-wanderer asks for their help in completing a series of tests to redeem an abandoned layer of the Abyss.
7	"Secrets of the Soul Pillars"	Jesse Decker	Jeff Carlisle, Andrew Hou, Arnold Tsang	12–13	109	April 2004
After several assassins attempt to kill the heroes, they are traced back to the temple of Wee Jas. After assaulting the temple and fighting its undead inhabitants, they are led to an ancient frozen spell weaver complex, where a powerful oracle is guarded by a horrific undying dragon.
8	"Lords of Oblivion"	Christopher Perkins	Peter Bergting	13–15	111	June 2004
An ally of the heroes is kidnapped and taken to a safe house of the Last Laugh, Cauldron's thieves guild. Once they break in and rescue him from the den of thieves, they learn of a secret meeting among some of the realm's most horrific criminals at a noble's mansion. In addition, their beholder overlord is practicing unholy rituals in the complex below.
9	"Foundation of Flame"	Chris Thomasson	Christine Choi, Benjamin Huen, Chris Stevens, UDON, Jim Zubkavich	15–16	113	August 2004
The Cagewrights begin their plans in earnest now, awakening the volcano on which Cauldron is built. Spewing lava, earthquakes, and collapsing buildings require the heroes help to get everyone evacuated. Worse, demodands begin to emerge from a planar rift already building, and a certain local dragon gets riled up by it all.
10	"Thirteen Cages"	Chris Thomasson	Ramón K. Pérez	16–18	114	September 2004
The heroes must march on the Cagewrights' headquarters, in the heart of a volcano, before their ritual is complete and a permanent gate to Carceri is opened above Cauldron.
11	"Strike on Shatterhorn"	Christopher Perkins	Tim Fowler, Eric Kim	18–19	115	October 2004
What few Cagewrights remain must be hunted down and exterminated in their jungle retreat.
12	"Asylum"	Christopher Perkins	Attila Adorjany, Jeff Carlisle, Eric Kim	19–20	116	November 2004
When the twisted mind of Adimarchus, imprisoned Demon Prince of Madness, leaks into Occipitus and begins resurrecting his followers, the heroes realize they must go to the otherworldly asylum of Skullrot where Adimarchus is imprisoned and destroy him utterly.

During the course of the adventure, the city is nearly destroyed by an eruption of the volcano under it, which is triggered by magical forces. Shattered, but still inhabited, the city of Cauldron still exists at the end of the adventure.

== Reception ==
The reviewer from Pyramid noted that: "Traditionally, the roleplaying scenario comes in just a few parts, typically a trilogy or quartet. Rarely do they come longer, although The Shackled City Adventure Path is a rare exception, consisting of 12 parts."

The expanded hardcover edition of the Shackled City Adventure Path won three ENnie awards at the 2006 Gen Con game fair, taking home the gold award for "Best Adventure" and "Best Campaign Setting/Supplement", as well as the silver award for "Best Cartography".

== Reviews ==
- Alarums & Excursions (Issue 405 - Jun 2009)
