= Chris Thomasson =

American game designer

- Occupation: Game designer

Chris Thomasson is a game designer who has worked primarily on role-playing games.

== Career ==
Chris Thomasson was Paizo Publishing's editor for Dungeon magazine when he announced "The Shackled City Adventure Path" in 2003.

His D&D design work includes the third edition Fiend Folio (2003), Monster Manual III (2004), Dungeon Master's Guide II (2005), Magic of Eberron (2005), Complete Psionic (2006), and Complete Champion (2007).
