= Monster Codex =

Monster Codex is a 2014 role-playing game supplement published by Paizo for Pathfinder Roleplaying Game.

== Contents ==
Monster Codex is a supplement in which 20 iconic monstrous races are expanded with deep lore, new rules, archetypes, and dozens of ready‑to‑use stat blocks to help gamemasters build encounters and campaigns around these classic foes.

== Reviews ==
- Rue Morgue #152
- Black Gate
