= Pathfinder (periodicals) =

Several related series of roleplaying game books

The cover of Burnt Offerings, the first part of Paizo Publishing's first Pathfinder Adventure Path, Rise of the Runelords

Pathfinder is a line of roleplaying game supplements published by Paizo Publishing since 2007. Originally designed for use with the revised 3rd edition of Dungeons & Dragons, they transitioned to the first edition of the Pathfinder Roleplaying Game in 2009, then to the second edition of Pathfinder in 2019.

Three lines of supplements are produced as of August 2019:

- Pathfinder Adventure Path
- Pathfinder Adventures
- Pathfinder Lost Omens

One previous line, Pathfinder Player Companion, has been discontinued.

== Business model ==
All Pathfinder books are published under the terms of the Open Game License (OGL). While the magazines Dragon and Dungeon were both licensed to make use of certain iconic elements of Dungeons & Dragons intellectual property, including material drawn from official settings published by Wizards of the Coast and unique monsters such as illithids, the terms of the OGL forbid the use of such "closed" IP elements. Conversely, however, OGL material from other roleplaying game publishers (such as Necromancer Games or Green Ronin Publishing) can be used in Pathfinder, whereas the terms of Paizo's license with Wizards of the Coast had prevented them from using any third-party OGL material in Dragon or Dungeon.

The Pathfinder product lines use a subscription business model, in addition to being sold in book stores, game stores, and online retailers. All of the subscriptions are ongoing, and can be canceled at any time, rather than being initially purchased for a set length of time as many magazine subscriptions are.

Each Pathfinder product is published in both print and PDF.

== Product lines ==
=== Pathfinder Adventure Path ===
Paizo Publishing's main Pathfinder periodical product line is its Adventure Paths. A continuation of the concept from Dungeon magazine, each year's worth of Pathfinder Adventure Path originally published two complete adventure paths in six-issue arcs, with supplementary articles to fill out each 96-page issue.

Paizo has published a number of adventure paths, including Rise of the Runelords, Curse of the Crimson Throne, Second Darkness, and Kingmaker. The "Council of Thieves" Adventure Path was the first published to use the rules of the Pathfinder Roleplaying Game. Beginning with the 145th issue released in August 2019, the start of the Age of Ashes Adventure Path, the series transitioned to the second edition of the Pathfinder RPG rules.

Starting with the release of issue 163 in January 2021, Adventure Path began to include shorter three-issue arcs that covered approximately ten character levels, with only some written to start with first-level characters.

Beginning in 2026, the series transitioned from a monthly 96-page softcover to quarterly 256-page hardcovers.

=== Pathfinder Adventures ===
Pathfinder Adventures are stand-alone adventure modules. Each module is a 64-page softcover (originally 32 pages) containing a single adventure and one or more new monsters. Each module also includes ready-to-play characters of the appropriate level for the adventure.

Pathfinder Adventures were originally called GameMastery Modules. The name was changed to Pathfinder Modules in June 2008 to bring it in line with the rest of the Pathfinder line. It took its current name with the launch of the second edition of the rules. Pathfinder Adventures is a quarterly publication.

=== Pathfinder Lost Omens ===
Pathfinder Lost Omens products, originally known as Pathfinder Chronicles then as the Pathfinder Campaign Setting line, are additional materials designed to explore the fictional world of Golarion during the "Age of Lost Omens", the setting of the Adventure Path and Adventure lines. The world has civilizations and nations inspired by those of Earth's real history and expands beyond the fictional tropes and literary references related to western civilization found in the works of mid-20th century authors like J. R. R. Tolkien or C. S. Lewis, adding elements from African mythology, Asian mythology or Middle East medieval fiction. Originally consisting of 64-page softcovers published bimonthly with occasional hardcover releases, with the transition to the second edition of the Pathfinder RPG, the line took its current name and moved to a publishing schedule of larger, less frequent hardcover books.

=== Pathfinder Player Companion (discontinued) ===
Pathfinder Player Companion products are 32-page softcover books that were released monthly. The line was targeted at players as opposed to game masters; each issue contains details on the fictional civilizations, races and organizations which populate the world of Golarion. Originally published bimonthly, beginning August 2012 the Player Companion became monthly. The line was discontinued following the release of the June 2019 issue, with it being merged with the Lost Omens line.
