= James Jacobs (game designer) =

American magazine editor and game designer

- Born: 1972 (age 53–54); United States
- Occupation: Game designer
- Writing career
- Language: English
- Genres: Fantasy, horror, occult

James Jacobs (born 1972) is an American designer and author of role-playing games and texts in the fantasy, horror and the occult genres.

== Career ==
Jacobs has been involved in the role-playing industry since the age of 16, when his adventure "Scepter of the Underworld" was published in Dungeon #12 in 1988. Jacobs grew up in Point Arena, California, and went to college at the University of California, Davis.

He moved to Seattle after graduating from college and worked his way into Wizards of the Coast's sales department. Jacobs has been the developer, lead designer, and sometimes cartographer on releases for Bastion Press, Green Ronin Publishing, Wizards of the Coast, and Paizo. Jacobs has authored and co-authored several other products for the Dungeons & Dragons fantasy roleplaying game, including Dungeon Master's Guide II, Lords of Madness, Frostburn, and Red Hand of Doom. He also wrote Fiendish Codex I: Hordes of the Abyss with fellow Paizo editor Erik Mona. Jacobs and Erik Mona co-wrote Expedition to the Ruins of Greyhawk (2007), a 3rd edition D&D remake of Greyhawk Ruins (1990).

Jacobs became the associate editor for Dungeon magazine, and later became the managing editor for the magazine. In the 2000s, Jacobs served as the editor-in-chief of Dungeon magazine, published by Paizo Publishing. Jacobs described himself as "one of the chief architects" of the Dungeon Adventure Paths, in addition to doing some work on all of the other adventures published in the magazine. Jacobs became the Editor-in-Chief for Dungeon magazine in June 2006. Jacobs is the Creative Director for the Pathfinder Adventure Paths-focused monthly publication from Paizo. He also wrote "Burnt Offerings", the adventure featured in Pathfinder: Rise of the Runelords #1.

Among Jacobs' other writings is the "Demonomicon of Iggwilv" feature in Dragon magazine, and he has contributed a number of adventure stories for Dungeon. Jacobs has also created many notable Dungeons & Dragons creatures, with the ulitharid, draknor, and the kaorti among the most prominent.
