= Adventure Path =

Series of events in tabletop role-playing games

An Adventure Path is a series of interlinked adventures (campaign) for tabletop role-playing games which can be played in succession and lead characters to advance from lower to higher levels, through a particular path of events.

While campaigns exist for many role-playing game systems, the specific term Adventure Path discussed here applies to published adventures for the Dungeons & Dragons and Pathfinder fantasy roleplaying games. Adventure Paths in opposition to normal campaigns usually have an own setting and rule set apart from the basic rules and settings.

== Origin and Dungeon magazine ==
Though the term was originally applied to the series of Dungeons & Dragons 3rd Edition modules beginning with The Sunless Citadel, it later came to refer to several lengthy series, each consisting of 11 or 12 installments, published sequentially in Dungeon magazine.

Typically set in the Greyhawk campaign setting, the Dungeon adventure paths are:

- Shackled City
- Age of Worms
- Savage Tide

After Dungeon became an online magazine for subscribers, one adventure path for 4th edition was published.

- Scales of War

== Paizo ==
With the transference of Dragon and Dungeon back to Wizards of the Coast, Paizo Publishing, which had been producing the magazines under contract to WotC, continued the Adventure Path concept in their new monthly publication, Pathfinder. Paizo began publishing Pathfinder Adventure Path as a monthly publication in 2007. Starting with Council of Thieves in 2009, Paizo's modules began supporting their Pathfinder Roleplaying Game in addition to D&D.

Pathfinder Adventure Paths and the publication date of their first chapter:

Originally published for the d20 System rule set under the Open Game License:

- Rise of the Runelords (August 2007)
- Curse of the Crimson Throne (February 2008)
- Second Darkness (August 2008)
- Legacy of Fire (February 2009)

Originally published for Pathfinder First Edition rule set:

- Council of Thieves (August 2009)
- Kingmaker (February 2010)
- Serpent's Skull (August 2010)
- Carrion Crown (February 2011)
- Jade Regent (August 2011)
- Skull and Shackles (February 2012)
- Shattered Star (August 2012)
- Reign of Winter (February 2013)
- Wrath of the Righteous (August 2013)
- Mummy's Mask (February 2014)
- Iron Gods (August 2014)
- Giantslayer (February 2015)
- Hell's Rebels (August 2015)
- Hell's Vengeance (February 2016)
- Strange Aeons (August 2016)
- Ironfang Invasion (February 2017)
- Ruins of Azlant (August 2017)
- War for the Crown (February 2018)
- Return of the Runelords (August 2018)
- Tyrant's Grasp (February 2019)

Originally published for Starfinder Roleplaying Game:

- Dead Suns (August 2017)
- Against the Aeon Throne (August 2018)
- Signal of Screams (November 2018)
- Dawn of Flame (February 2019)
- Attack of the Swarm! (August 2019)
- The Threefold Conspiracy (February 2020)
- The Devastation Ark (August 2020)
- Fly Free or Die (November 2020)
- Horizons of the Vast (July 2021)
- Drift Crashers (June 2022)
- Drift Hackers (December 2022)

Originally published for Pathfinder Second Edition rule set:

- Age of Ashes (August 2019)
- Extinction Curse (January 2020)
- Agents of Edgewatch (July 2020)
- Abomination Vaults (January 2021)
- Fists of the Ruby Phoenix (April 2021)
- Strength of Thousands (July 2021)
- Quest for the Frozen Flame (January 2022)
- Outlaws of Alkenstar (April 2022)
- Blood Lords (July 2022)
- Gatewalkers (January 2023)
- Stolen Fate (April 2023)
- Sky King's Tomb (July 2023)
- Season of Ghosts (October 2023)
- Seven Dooms for Sandpoint (February 2024)
