= Jason Bulmahn =

Game designer

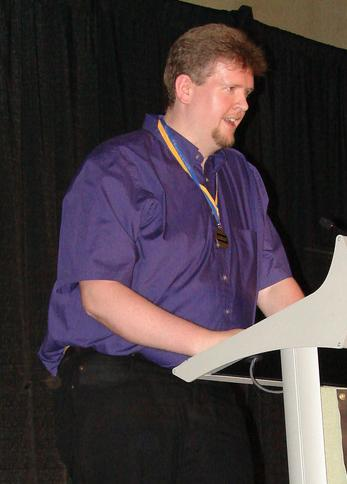
- Gen Con 2010: Speaking at the Ennies; 6 August 2010
- Born: United States
- Occupation: Game designer
- Writing career
- Subject: Role-playing games
- Notable work: Pathfinder Roleplaying Game
- Website: jasonbulmahn.com

Jason Bulmahn is an American game designer especially known for his work on the fantasy role-playing game Pathfinder.

== Early life and education ==
Jason Bulmahn was born in Milwaukee, Wisconsin. He attended Milwaukee High School of the Arts, and became an avid player of tabletop games. He attended his first Gen Con convention in Milwaukee while in high school, and developed an interest in role-playing games such as Dungeons & Dragons (D&D).

Bulmahn graduated from high school in 1994, and enrolled at University of Wisconsin–Milwaukee. While attending classes, Bulmahn also became a competitive Magic: The Gathering player, and played in the 1995 World Championship in Seattle, as well as Pro Tour New York in 1996. Bulmahn earned his Bachelor of Arts degree in Architecture in 1998.

== Architecture ==
After graduating, Bulmahn was employed as an Associate Designer at American Design Incorporated, an architecture firm in Milwaukee. He also began to volunteer at the Role Playing Game Association Network (RPGA). He worked on the Living Greyhawk campaign, at first coordinating play in Wisconsin, then later becoming part of the central advisory group overseeing the campaign's global structure. In later interviews, Bulmahn would credit this experience with teaching him "more about pacing, stakes, and improvisation than any book ever could."

== Game industry ==
In 2004, Bulmahn decided to make a career in the game industry, and applied to Wizards of the Coast (WotC), publishers of D&D. When he failed to get a position there, Bulmahn took a job at Paizo Publishing as managing editor of Dragon, which Paizo produced under license from WotC. Bulmahn's time as editor marked the final years of Dragon as a print publication. In 2007, WotC announced that it would not be renewing Paizo's license for Dragon, instead opting for online publishing. Paizo published the last print edition of Dragon in September 2007.

Following this, Bulmahn was made lead designer at Paizo. Later the same year, when WotC announced the discontinuation of D&D 3.5 to make way for the fourth edition of D&D, Paizo decided not to apply for a license for the new system, but instead to continue to support D&D 3.5. Bulmahn had been developing his own version of the d20 system as a side project, which would eventually result in the Pathfinder Roleplaying Game.

=== Pathfinder ===
In early 2008, Paizo announced that Bulmahn would be the lead designer of the fantasy role-playing game Pathfinder being developed as a continuation of D&D 3.5.

The Beta version of Pathfinder was made available as a free download in August 2008 and won the 2008 gold ENnie Award for "Best Free Product or Web Enhancement". Bulmahn also led the design of the Core Rulebook and numerous supplements, including Advanced Player’s Guide, Ultimate Magic, Ultimate Combat, and Mythic Adventures.

=== Minotaur Games ===
In 2013, Bulmahn formed Minotaur Games, a game publishing company dedicated to creating high-quality supplemental material for Pathfinder and other role-playing games. He also used Minotaur to self-publish original works such as a pirate-themed card game, Pirate Loot.

=== Starfinder ===
In 2017, Bulmahn was named as Director of Game Design at Paizo, and helped develop the science fiction/fantasy role-playing game Starfinder. He also oversaw the development of updates and design work for the 2nd edition of Starfinder.

=== Writing and adventure design ===
Aside from system designing, Bulmahn has also authored and co-authored many adventures and sourcebooks, including

- Carnival of Tears,
- The Fall of Plaguestone, the first module for the second edition of Pathfinder.
- Articles for Dungeon and Dragon.

Bulmahn also worked on D&D products for WotC such as Dungeonscape, Secrets of Xen’drik, Expedition to the Ruins of Greyhawk, and Elder Evils

=== Pathfinder second edition ===
In 2018 and 2019, Bulmahn was the lead designer of Pathfinder Second Edition).

=== Hopefinder ===
In 2023, Bulmahn expanded beyond fantasy role-playing, contributing to the development of Hopefinder, a horror-themed role-playing game that uses the Pathfinder Second Edition game rules.

=== Further role at Paizo ===
In 2024, Bulmahn was the Director of Games at Paizo Inc. and was responsible for the design teams that created all of the company's RPG product lines. He also continued to write material for Minotaur Games and freelanced game design, event organization, and narrative design.
