= James L. Sutter =

American role-playing game designer

- Born: March 1, 1984 (age 42); Issaquah, Washington, United States
- Occupations: Writer, game designer
- Writing career
- Genres: Role-playing games, fantasy

James L. Sutter (born March 1984) is an American game designer, author, and musician, best known for co-creating the Pathfinder Roleplaying Game and the Starfinder Roleplaying Game, serving as Starfinder's original Creative Director.

== Career ==
James L. Sutter joined Paizo Publishing as an assistant editor on Dungeon Magazine before working as both a developer and editor to help create the Pathfinder Roleplaying Game. He currently serves as Paizo's executive editor, and commissions all the Pathfinder Tales novels. In 2016, he was announced as the creative director in charge of the new Starfinder Roleplaying Game for Paizo. He has written several novels, game books, and short stories in such publications as Machine of Death, Beneath Ceaseless Skies, Escape Pod and Podcastle. He also published the young adult novel Darkhearts (2023).

== Novels ==
- Pathfinder Tales: Death's Heretic. Paizo, 2011. ISBN 978-1601253705. (finalist for the Compton Crook Award)
- Pathfinder Tales: The Redemption Engine. Paizo, 2014. ISBN 978-1601256188. (winner of the Scribe Award for Best Original Speculative Novel)
- Darkhearts. Wednesday Books, 2023. ISBN 978-1250869746.
- The Ghost of Us. Wednesday Books, 2024. ISBN 978-1250869760.
