= Pathfinder Roleplaying Game =

Tabletop role-playing game

Pathfinder
- Pathfinder Core Rulebook 1st edition cover
- Designers: Jason Bulmahn
- Publishers: Paizo Publishing
- Publication: August 2009; 17 years ago; 2019 (2nd edition); 2023 (2nd edition remastered)
- Years active: 2009–present
- Genres: Role-playing game
- Systems: d20 system
- Chance: Dice rolling
- Website: paizo.com/pathfinderRPG

The Pathfinder Roleplaying Game is a fantasy role-playing game (RPG) that was published in 2009 by Paizo Publishing.

The first edition extends and modifies the System Reference Document (SRD) based on the revised 3rd edition Dungeons & Dragons (D&D) published by Wizards of the Coast under the Open Game License (OGL) and is intended to be backward-compatible with that edition.

A new version of the game, Pathfinder Second Edition, was released in August 2019. It continued to use the OGL and SRD, but significant revisions to the core rules made the new edition incompatible with content from either Pathfinder 1st Edition or any edition of D&D. Starting in 2023, the game instead began using the Open RPG Creative ("ORC") License, though it remains backwards-compatible with the existing OGL-licensed Second Edition rules. As part of the process of bringing the game under the ORC license, Pathfinder 2nd Edition was "Remastered" to remove content licensed exclusively under the OGL.

Pathfinder is supported by the official Pathfinder periodicals and various third-party content created to be compatible with the game.

== Gameplay ==
Pathfinder is a tabletop role-playing game based on a d20 system, in which most outcomes are based on the roll of a 20-sided die along with additional modifiers. One player acts as the game master for one or more other players, guiding them through an adventure path (or module), which can consist of exploration, combat, and non-violent interactions with non-player characters.

Pathfinder is set in a high fantasy world, where the primary technology is akin to the Middle Ages, and coexists alongside magic and fantasy creatures. Players create a character based on their species and a character class, which establishes many of their fundamental attributes, such as hit points, attack modifiers, skill checks, and saving throws.

== Background ==
Beginning in 2002, Paizo took over publishing Dragon and Dungeon magazines, which were about the Dungeons & Dragons (D&D) role-playing game, under contract to the game's publishers Wizards of the Coast. Wizards of the Coast chose not to renew the contract in early 2007 and Paizo began publishing the Pathfinder periodical line as a replacement. In August 2007, Wizards of the Coast announced the pending release of the 4th edition of D&D (4e), which replaced version 3.5 (3.5e). Many of the staff at Paizo were concerned about the more restrictive Game System License under which the 4th edition was being released, compared to the earlier Open Game License (OGL). They had also not been provided with a copy of the 4e rules.

During their time publishing the magazines, Paizo developed their own adventure path, Shackled City, using the 3.5e rules, originally published in segments within Dungeon over several issues and later collected for release in a standalone project. Due to the uncertainty with the 4e rules and license, Paizo developed a new adventure path called Pathfinder, designed to bridge the gap from 3.5e to 4e, but still based on the 3.5e rules as they knew the current 3.5e license allowed for third party material that was compatible. Jason Bulmahn, one of the Paizo designers, had envisioned a modified ruleset from 3.5e with Pathfinder in mind, and when he presented his idea to the company, they decided to go all in to make a wholly new ruleset named the Pathfinder Roleplaying Game, with Bulmahn leading its design. Announced in March 2008, Pathfinder was designed over the course of a year using an open playtest model, where players could try the system and post their feedback on Paizo's website.

The first Pathfinder rulebook was released in 2008. Paizo was not sure how D&D fans would react to a derivative project, nor how Wizard of the Coast would respond. Preorders for the first printing were sold out before Paizo had received their books, and they quickly issued a second printing to meet the high demand.

=== First edition ===
Informally nicknamed D&D version 3.75, the first edition of Pathfinder is a modification of the 3.5e rules and is intended to be compatible with the older game. Bulmahn felt that the basic classes of 3.5e were lackluster, as they did not provide incentive to stay with a single class for 20 levels of play. Pathfinder adds many options to the classes and boosts their abilities in their core roles.

The game has also been modified compared to D&D version 3.5. Changes were made involving balance between different game elements. For example, less combat-oriented classes receive more hit points each level than their 3.5 counterparts. Additionally, several aspects of 3.5 have been changed in Pathfinder, including several spells, the skill system and combat maneuvers such as tripping and grappling.

The material published by Paizo for the Pathfinder system has been set in a world called Golarion.

Paizo also introduced the Pathfinder Society, an organized game play program. Players register their characters on Paizo's website, allowing players to use their characters in different play sessions and different groups while continuing to earn experience, money and prestige points. After a session has ended, the player will receive a chronicle sheet, listing what has been earned during the session. The player will use these chronicle sheets to log this information on the website.

=== Second edition ===
In March 2018, Paizo announced that it would be conducting a playtest for a second Edition of Pathfinder. Paizo announced in May 2018 that it was working on Pathfinder Second Edition to refine elements of the rule set to reflect feedback and clarification on the original system over the prior years. The preliminary ruleset was published in August 2018 as Pathfinder Playtest so that players could test out and provide feedback. The final rule set was released on August 1, 2019. A 6-volume Adventure Path was released for Second Edition, designed to take player characters from 1st to 20th level.

Among key changes in the second edition is a streamlined action economy. Each round, each character can perform up to three actions on their turn as well as one reaction on their own turn or another character's turn. Most basic moves, such as moving across the ground, drawing a weapon, or making an attack cost a single action, while more complicated maneuvers may require two or three actions. The rules around magic items have been changed to discourage players from hoarding too many items and instead encouraging them to seek out more powerful equipment. Critical hits have also been changed – a critical success now occurs any time a combatant rolls 10 more than the target's armor class. Combatants can also critically succeed when defending which usually results in no effect rather than the reduced effect a save would usually bring. Finally there has been a broad change to all number scaling of skills, armor class, attack rolls, saves, and difficulty classes. All these numbers now scale 1-to-1 with a character's level plus a stat plus a bonus between two and eight depending on their proficiency. This results in extremely bounded values when compared to the first edition. Stats have also had their range lowered when compared to the first edition.

In October 2021, Paizo announced a partnership with Demiplane to provide Pathfinder Nexus; the online platform provides a digital rules and lore compendium for Pathfinder Second Edition, character creation and management tools, matchmaking, and video chat functionality. An early access version of Pathfinder Nexus, titled Pathfinder Primer, was launched at the time of the announcement.

==== Second Edition Remaster ====
In April 2023, Paizo announced a set of four new primary rulebooks (Player Core, GM Core, Monster Core, and Player Core 2), to be released over the course of 2023 and 2024. Collectively referred to as the Pathfinder Second Edition Remaster Project, these four new books are intended to fully replace the existing four primary rulebooks (the Core Rulebook, Bestiary, Gamemastery Guide, and Advanced Player's Guide) which will not be reprinted in the future.

In addition to incorporating extensive errata based on player feedback, these new books (and all future Paizo publications) would be published under the new Open RPG Creative License (ORC), rather than the previous OGL, due to significant controversy over the license earlier that year. Because of this licensing transition, certain game elements (such as some spells, magic items, and monsters) inherited from the Dungeons & Dragons 3.5 SRD had to be renamed, changed, or in some cases fully removed (such as alignment, or the eight schools of magic). Despite these changes, the new books remain backwards-compatible with existing Second Edition supplements.

== Supplementary material ==
The first edition has been supplemented by expansions and accessory books which contain expanded rules, new classes, spells, equipment, and other optional game features. The books in the Bestiary series contain statistics and descriptions of creatures that player characters may encounter. A related supplement, the Monster Codex (2014), offered a selection of more specialized monsters, such as a "goblin vulture rider". The Advanced Player's Guide (2010) allowed Paizo to expand the game beyond its d20 System roots by adding six new base classes, and added the concept of class "archetypes", themed variations of the core classes with alternate class features. The Advanced Class Guide (2014) expanded the options for character development further by adding ten more character classes, including the investigator, the swashbuckler, and the warpriest. Pathfinder Unchained (2015) offered a variety of optional rules to streamline or otherwise customize gameplay, including new rules for skills and magic items, and alternative versions of classes like the summoner. Further Pathfinder supplements include the Advanced Race Guide (2012), which extended the options for player character races; Mythic Adventures (2013), which provided options for "epic level" play beyond the core game's normal limits; and Occult Adventures (2016), which introduced six supernatural classes including the kineticist, medium, and psychic.

Paizo also produced the Pathfinder Beginner Box, a basic version of the Pathfinder rules intended to introduce new gamers to the hobby.

OtherWorld Creations (later renamed to Super Genius Games) published a series of Genius Guide books for Pathfinder, beginning with The Genius Guide to the Shaman (2009), and added Owen K.C. Stephens as their Pathfinder line manager, publishing a new Pathfinder PDF weekly starting in November 2009. OtherWorld Creations was the most prolific licensee for Pathfinder at that time, and compiled their PDFs for print beginning with Adventurer's Handbook: Genius Guide Volume 1 (2010), leading Paizo to significantly promote the company. The founders of Super Genius Games left the company in 2013, and formed the publisher Rogue Genius Games to take over publishing their Pathfinder releases.

Accessories produced include gridded maps, both specific to adventures and generic. Pathfinder Pawns is a line of boxed sets featuring cardboard illustrations of characters and monsters that can be used as gaming miniatures; Pathfinder Battles, a line of plastic miniatures, is produced under license by WizKids.

== Reception ==
Pathfinder was the top-selling role-playing game in spring 2011, fall 2012, spring 2013, fall 2013, and summer 2014. During that four-year period, Pathfinder was at times able to outsell Dungeons & Dragons itself, which was the best-selling game through various editions between 1974 and 2010. Upon the release of Dungeons & Dragons 5th edition, that game has regained the top spot since fall 2014, with Pathfinder consistently still ranking second to D&D in sales.

Paizo has won ENnie Awards at Gen Con in a variety of categories including Best Publisher and Best Game. The beta release of the first edition of the game won the 2008 Silver ENnie award for "Best Free Product or Web-Enhancement". The Pathfinder Second Edition Core Rulebook is a 2020 Origins Award nominee, and winner of the 2019 Techraptor Award (Readers' Choice as Tabletop RPG of the Year).

Scott Taylor for Black Gate in 2013 rated Pathfinder as #3 in the top ten role-playing games of all time, saying "The release of the Pathfinder RPG in 2008 was the springboard needed by the company to harness the power of a glut of D&D 3.0 and 3.5 players incensed by WotC's change to D&D 4E. The result is a game that has revolutionized what it means to use an OGL to your favor while making a name for itself as an inspired company who has the best wishes of their players foremost in their minds."

When reviewing the second edition in August 2019, Charlie Hall of Polygon said it "feels unified and complete, rather than a hodgepodge of errata and exceptions that had accumulated for its previous iteration. As an exercise in graphic design, the Pathfinder Core Rulebook itself is extraordinary. Details that would be relegated to a sidebar or a tiny, bespoke graphic in other game systems get entire pages with elaborate diagrams and drawings. That kind of attention to detail, coupled with the repetition within the text itself, makes it a true reference document".

Pathfinder Player Core won the 2024 Silver ENNIE Award for "Best Rules", and Pathfinder Lost Omens: Tian Xia World Guide won the 2024 Gold ENNIE Award for "Best Setting".

== Related products ==
=== Card games ===
A card game based on the role-playing game, the Pathfinder Adventure Card Game, was released at Gen Con 2013. It was designed by Mike Selinker of Lone Shark Games. The initial set for the game, Rise of the Runelords, was followed by the expansions Skull and Shackles, Wrath of the Righteous and Mummy's Mask. A second edition of the core game set introducing a story book element was released in May 2019.

A Pathfinder-themed edition of the Munchkin card game was released by Steve Jackson Games in 2013.

=== Fiction ===
Paizo published a line of novels, Pathfinder Tales, based in the Pathfinder setting. The first book, Prince of Wolves, was released in 2010 and was written by Dave Gross, former editor of Dragon magazine. Other titles in the series, which numbers over 30 books, include City of the Fallen Sky by Tim Pratt, Winter Witch by Elaine Cunningham, The Wizard's Mask by Ed Greenwood, and Death's Heretic by line editor James L. Sutter.

Dynamite Entertainment has produced a line of Pathfinder comic books, including a spin-off title, Pathfinder: Goblins, as well as Pathfinder: Worldscape, which also featured characters such as Red Sonja, Tarzan and John Carter.

Big Finish Productions has produced a series of audio dramas based on the Pathfinder setting called Pathfinder Legends.

As a promotion for the second edition of Pathfinder, Paizo teamed up with Geek & Sundry to produce an actual play series called Pathfinder: Knights of Everflame, which sees Jason Bulmahn run a game for five adventurers using this game system. As of November 2019, the series has finished its first 8-episode season, and is currently in the middle of its second season.

=== Video games ===
Three video games based in the Pathfinder setting have been published. Pathfinder Online, a massively multiplayer online roleplaying game, was announced on November 27, 2012, by Paizo and Goblin Works and was successful in attracting crowdfunding on Kickstarter to finance its development. An official alpha test was announced in late June 2014. Early enrollment was announced on July 29, 2015. On September 2, 2015, Lisa Stevens, acting CEO of Goblin Works and CEO of Paizo announced layoffs at Goblin Works of most of the Pathfinder Online development team. The game has never left early enrollment.

On May 17, 2017, another video game, Pathfinder: Kingmaker, was announced by Paizo and developer Owlcat Games. An accompanying Kickstarter campaign was launched in June 2017. The game was released on September 25, 2018. It is an isometric RPG similar to the Infinity Engine games, and adapts the Kingmaker adventure path using the Pathfinder first edition rules.

In February 2020, Owlcat Games launched a Kickstarter campaign to fund a sequel entitled Pathfinder: Wrath of the Righteous. It was set for alpha testing in April 2020 and was released on September 2, 2021. The game is an adaptation of Paizo's "Wrath of the Righteous" adventure path.

=== Pathfinder for Savage Worlds ===
In November 2020, Paizo and Pinnacle Entertainment Group announced Pathfinder for Savage Worlds, an adaptation of the setting of Pathfinder for use with Pinnacle's Savage Worlds RPG. The initial line launched on August 1, 2022, and includes Pathfinder for Savage Worlds: Core Rules, Pathfinder for Savage Worlds: Bestiary, and Pathfinder for Savage Worlds: Companion. Boxed sets were also released at the same time, including Pathfinder for Savage Worlds: Rise of the Runelords and Pathfinder for Savage Worlds: Ultimate Boxed Set. The Savage Worlds gameplay differs from that of Pathfinder Second Edition by having players create characters with edges and hinderances, or abilities and flaws, as well as seeing players roll different kinds of polyhedral dice depending on how competent their character is at performing the task at hand.

== See also ==
- The Glass Cannon
- List of Pathfinder books
- Starfinder Roleplaying Game
