= Julia Marcell =

Polish singer-songwriter and pianist

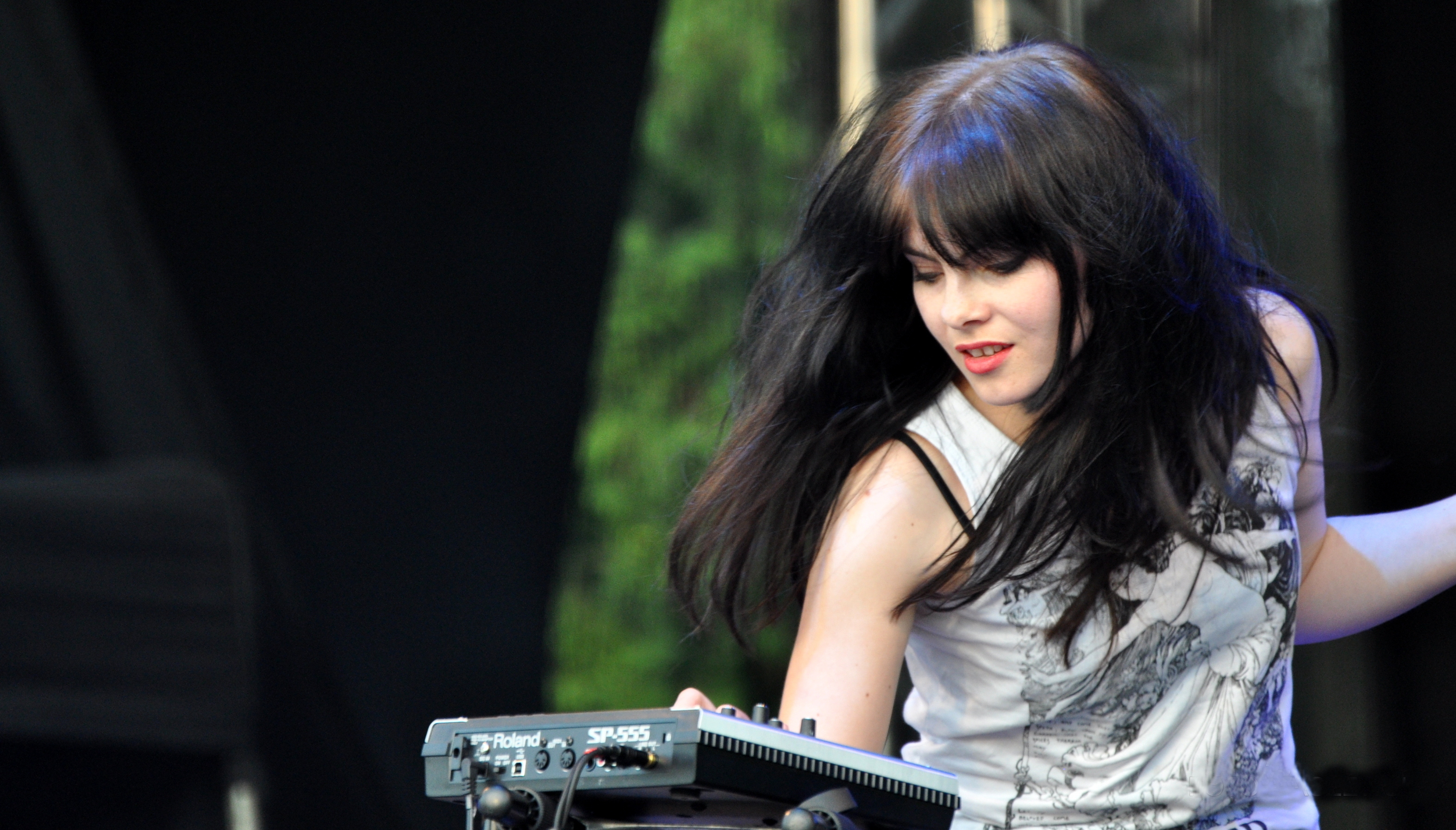
- Marcell in 2012

Background information
- Born: Julia Górniewicz; 1982 (age 43–44)
- Origin: Olsztyn, Warmian-Masurian Voivodeship, Poland
- Genres: Baroque pop, experimental music, anti-folk, acoustic music, synthpop, indie pop
- Occupations: Singer-songwriter, pianist
- Years active: 2007–present
- Labels: Galapagos Music, Sellaband, Inappropriate Behaviour, Haldern, Mystic Production
- Website: www.juliamarcell.com

Julia Marcell (née Górniewicz; born 1982) is a Polish singer-songwriter and pianist.

== Career ==
Marcell was born Olsztyn, Poland, in 1982. Her father, Józef Górniewicz, is a Polish pedagogue and was the dean of the University of Warmia and Mazury in Olsztyn from 2008 to 2012. She has written songs since she was 14 years old, and circa 2007 she learned how to play the piano. In 2007, she released her first album, the extended play Storm.

In October 2007, with the help of fans from around the world, she obtained a sum of US$50,000 (through the website Sellaband) to record her first studio album. Titled It Might Like You, it was released in Germany in 2009 and produced by Moses Schneider, who previously worked with bands such as Turbostaat, Beatsteaks, Kreator and Tocotronic.

In 2008, Marcell sang a duet with dark cabaret singer Voltaire, named "This Sea". The song appears on his album To the Bottom of the Sea. On the same album, Voltaire makes a cover of her song "Accordion Player". She collaborated with Voltaire once more in 2014, on his album Raised by Bats, on the track "The Devil and Mr. Jones".

On 3 October 2011 she released a second studio album, entitled June, which brought a big change in style and saw Marcell play with rhythm and expand her sound with the addition of electronic instruments. June's first single, "Matrioszka", was released on 7 August 2011 as a teaser. The music video for "Matrioszka" was released on 27 August 2011. The second single for June, "CTRL", was released on 30 November 2011. The third single, "I Wanna Get on Fire", was released on 20 June 2012, alongside a music video. For June, Marcell was awarded with the prestigious Paszport Polityki prize in 2011, in the "Popular Music" category, and in 2012 she was nominated to seven Fryderyks, winning one of them.

In 2013 she collaborated with theatre director Krzysztof Garbaczewski by providing the music to his adaptations of Marcin Cecko's Kamienne niebo zamiast gwiazd and Witold Gombrowicz's Kronos.

In 2014 she composed the soundtrack of Przemysław Wojcieszek's film Jak całkowicie zniknąć.

Her third studio album, Sentiments, was released on 6 October 2014. On 10 September 2014 she released a music video for one of the tracks that would appear on the album, "Manners".

On 5 January 2016 Marcell announced on her official Facebook page that she began work on her fourth album, Proxy, which was eventually released on 11 March 2016. On the same day she released the promotional single "Andrew" on iTunes.

== Discography ==
=== Studio albums ===
Title	Album details	Peak chart positions
Title	Album details	POL
Storm (EP)	Released: 2007; Label: Self-released; Formats: CD	—
It Might Like You	Released: 16 October 2009; Label: Galapagos Music, Sellaband; Formats: CD, digital download	—
June	Released: 3 October 2011; Label: Mystic Production, Haldern; Formats: CD, digital download	20
Sentiments	Released: 6 October 2014; Label: Mystic Production; Formats: CD, digital download	21
Proxy	Released: 11 March 2016; Label: Mystic Production; Formats: CD, digital download	10
"—" denotes a recording that did not chart or was not released in that territory.

=== Music videos ===
Title	Year	Directed	Album
"Matrioszka"	2011	Iwona Bielecka	June
"CTRL"	2011	Iwona Bielecka, Julia Marcell	June
"I Wanna Get on Fire"	2012	Iwona Bielecka, Julia Marcell	June
"Manners"	2014	Julia Sausen, Julia Marcell	Sentiments
"Andrew"	2016	Julia Sausen, Julia Marcell	Proxy
"Tarantino"	2016	Julia Marcell	Proxy
"Tesko"	2017	Julia Sausen	Proxy
