= Smack Smash =

Studio album by Beatsteaks
- Released: 29 March 2004
- Recorded: Berlin, Germany
- Genres: Punk rock Alternative rock
- Length: 31:58
- Labels: Epitaph Records; WEA
- Producer: Moses Schneider

Beatsteaks chronology
Living Targets (2002)	Smack Smash (2004)	.limbo messiah (2007)

Singles from Smack Smash
- 1. "Hand in Hand" Released: 15 March 2004; 2. "I Don't Care as Long as You Sing" Released: 14 June 2004; 3. "Hello Joe" Released: 11 October 2004

Professional ratings
Review scores
Source	Rating
Allmusic	not rated link
CounterCulture	link

Smack Smash is the fourth album from German band, Beatsteaks. It was released in March 2004 on Epitaph Records as was previous album, Living Targets, in 2002. It aided the band's breakthrough into the mainstream and was simultaneously released on WEA. The first two singles, "Hand in Hand" and "I Don't Care as Long as You Sing" became major hits on German MTV and the album nearly broke into the German top ten. The increased exposure allowed the band to play concerts in other European countries. It shipped 100,000 copies in Germany, going gold only for the album to go platinum in 2008 for shipping 200,000 copies in total since its release.

== Track listing ==
All tracks are written by Beatsteaks.

No.	Title	Length
1.	"Big Attack"	2:24
2.	"Vision"	2:49
3.	"Ain't Complaining"	2:48
4.	"Hello Joe"	3:29
5.	"Hand In Hand"	2:41
6.	"Monster"	2:02
7.	"Everything"	3:09
8.	"I Don't Care As Long As You Sing"	3:35
9.	"Atomic Love"	2:33
10.	"Loyal To None"	1:28
11.	"What's Coming Over You"	3:15
12.	"My Revelation"	1:45
Total length:		32:03

== Credits ==
- Arnim Teutoburg-Weiß – Vocals, guitar
- Peter Baumann – Guitar
- Bernd Kurtzke – Guitar
- Torsten Scholz – Bass
- Thomas Götz – Drums
- Recorded in Berlin, Germany
- Produced by Moses Schneider
- Mixed by Peter Schmidt

== Charts ==
=== Weekly charts ===
Chart (2004)	Peak position
Austrian Albums (Ö3 Austria)	19
German Albums (Offizielle Top 100)	11
Swiss Albums (Schweizer Hitparade)	74

=== Year-end charts ===
Chart (2004)	Position
German Albums (Offizielle Top 100)	31
