= Almost Human (Voltaire album) =

Studio album by Voltaire
- Released: August 1, 2000
- Genre: Dark cabaret
- Length: 53:36
- Label: Projekt Records

Voltaire chronology
The Devil's Bris (1998)	Almost Human (2000)	Banned on Vulcan (2001)

Professional ratings
Review scores
Source	Rating
AllMusic	link

Almost Human is the second studio album by Cuban American dark cabaret singer Voltaire, released on August 1, 2000, through Projekt Records.

According to Voltaire on his official website, the album is intended to convey a "look at life from the perspective of Lucifer"; thus being, most of the album's tracks deal with existentialism, the human condition and the existence of God, in Voltaire's usual tongue-in-cheek humorous way. Also present in the album are covers of the traditional songs "El Barquito de Nuez" and "Ringo no Uta" – the first one was composed by famous Mexican songwriter Francisco Gabilondo Soler, while the second one was composed by Hachiro Sato and Manjome Tadashi for the 1945 film Soyokaze. They are fully sung in Spanish and Japanese, respectively.

The song "Almost Human" is a song from the perspective of Lucifer, and "Feathery Wings" from the perspective of the Angel of Death. "Anastasia" references the fate of Russian princess Anastasia Nikolayevna.

Voltaire originally wrote the track "The Night" in 1988; a more deathrock-inflected version of it would appear on his 2014 album Raised by Bats.

The track "Alchemy Mondays" is a tribute to the eponymous goth event which used to take place at the famous, now-defunct music club CBGB, in Manhattan. Musician Myke Hideous of Misfits and The Bronx Casket Co. fame is also mentioned on the song's lyrics.

== Track listing ==
All tracks are written by Voltaire, Gregor Kitzis, Matthew Goeke and George Grant, except for "Ringo no Uta" by Hachiro Sato and Manjome Tadashi and "El Barquito de Nuez" by Francisco Gabilondo Soler.

No.	Title	Length
1.	"Out of Reach"	4:23
2.	"Dunce"	5:16
3.	"Feathery Wings"	5:05
4.	"Almost Human"	3:54
5.	"God Thinks"	4:12
6.	"Anastasia"	5:21
7.	"Dead Girls"	4:12
8.	"Underground"	4:10
9.	"Ringo no Uta" (リンゴの唄; The Apple Song)	1:29
10.	"The Headless Waltz"	3:36
11.	"Alchemy Mondays"	1:28
12.	"The Last Word"	4:40
13.	"The Night"	4:32
14.	"El Barquito de Nuez" (The Little Walnut Boat)	1:17

== Personnel ==
- Voltaire — vocals/acoustic guitar
- Gregor Kitzis — violin
- Matthew Goeke — cello
- George Grant — bass
- Stephen Moses/Grisha Alexiev — drums

== In popular culture ==
The song "The Night" from the album is prominently featured in the 2016 self-titled first episode of the animated web series The Vampair by Daria Cohen, in which it is presented as being sung by the vampire Duke to the then-human Melissa "Missi" Dumarias on her entry to his castle, which she proceeds to wrest from his control, becoming a vampire herself on taking Duke's sceptre.
