= Ringo no Uta =

Ringo no Uta may refer to:

- "Ringo no Uta" (Michiko Namiki and Noboru Kirishima song), a 1945 song
- "Ringo no Uta" (Ringo Sheena song), a 2003 song
