= .limbo messiah =

Studio album by Beatsteaks
- Released: 2 April 2007
- Genre: Alternative rock
- Length: 31:20
- Label: Warner Music Group
- Producer: Moses Schneider

Beatsteaks chronology
| Smack Smash (2004) | .limbo messiah (2007) | Kanonen auf Spatzen (2008) |

Singles from .limbo messiah
- 1. "Jane Became Insane" Released: 9 March 2007; 2. "Cut Off the Top" Released: 29 June 2007; 3. "Demons Galore" Released: 5 October 2007; 4. "Meantime" Released: 7 December 2007

Professional ratings
Review scores
| Source | Rating |
|---|---|
| laut.de | link |

.limbo messiah is the fifth studio album by German punk rock band Beatsteaks. The album reached the European Top 100 Albums charts.

== Track list ==
All tracks are written by Beatsteaks.

| No. | Title | Length |
|---|---|---|
| 1. | "As I Please" | 2:35 |
| 2. | "Jane Became Insane" | 2:45 |
| 3. | "Sharp, Cool & Collected" | 2:12 |
| 4. | "Meantime" | 2:30 |
| 5. | "Demons Galore" | 2:51 |
| 6. | "Cut Off The Top" | 3:13 |
| 7. | "Bad Brain" | 2:38 |
| 8. | "She Was Great" | 2:46 |
| 9. | "Soljanka" | 3:54 |
| 10. | "Hail To The Freaks" | 3:13 |
| 11. | "E-G-O" | 2:43 |
| Total length: | | 31:20 |

== Personnel ==
- Arnim Teutoburg-Weiß – lead vocals
- Bernd Kurtzke – guitar, background vocals
- Peter Baumann – bass, guitar, background vocals
- Torsten Scholz – bass
- Thomas Götz – drums
- Arne Denneler – production assistant, editing
- Andi "The Dog" Jung – mixing
- Moses Schneider – producer, engineer, mixing

== Charts ==
=== Weekly charts ===
| Chart (2007) | Peak position |
|---|---|
| Austrian Albums (Ö3 Austria) | 4 |
| German Albums (Offizielle Top 100) | 3 |
| Austrian Albums (Ö3 Austria) | 19 |

=== Year-end charts ===
| Chart (2007) | Position |
|---|---|
| German Albums (Offizielle Top 100) | 58 |
