= Daarken =

American artist

- Born: Michael Lim
- Known for: Fantasy art

Michael Lim, better known by his pseudonym Daarken, is an artist whose work has appeared in role-playing games.

== Career ==
His Dungeons & Dragons work includes interior art for Races of Eberron (2005), Heroes of Horror (2005), Races of the Dragon (2006), Tome of Magic (2006), Power of Faerûn (2006), Monster Manual IV (2006), Dragons of Faerûn (2006), Dragon Magic (2006), Cityscape (2006), Fiendish Codex II: Tyrants of the Nine Hells (2006), Dungeonscape (2007), Monster Manual V (2007), The Grand History of the Realms (2007), Elder Evils (2007), An Adventurer's Guide to Eberron (2008), and the 4th edition Manual of the Planes (2008).

He is known for his work on the Magic: The Gathering collectible card game. In 2012 his book "Elysium-The Art of Daarken" was published.

In 2011, he provided the cover art for Cuban American dark cabaret singer Voltaire's eighth studio album, Riding a Black Unicorn Down the Side of an Erupting Volcano While Drinking from a Chalice Filled with the Laughter of Small Children.
