= Riding a Black Unicorn Down the Side of an Erupting Volcano While Drinking from a Chalice Filled with the Laughter of Small Children =

Studio album by Aurelio Voltaire
- Released: September 2, 2011
- Genre: Dark cabaret; comedy rock
- Length: 41:46
- Label: Mars Needs Music
- Producer: Aurelio Voltaire

Aurelio Voltaire chronology
| Hate Lives in a Small Town (2010) | Riding a Black Unicorn Down the Side of an Erupting Volcano While Drinking from a Chalice Filled with the Laughter of Small Children (2011) | The Cave Canem Demos (2012) |

Professional ratings
Review scores
| Source | Rating |
|---|---|
| COMA Music Magazine | Favorable link |

Riding a Black Unicorn Down the Side of an Erupting Volcano While Drinking from a Chalice Filled with the Laughter of Small Children (more commonly referred to by its abbreviated name Riding a Black Unicorn...) is the eighth studio album by dark cabaret singer Aurelio Voltaire, released on September 2, 2011. Beginning with this album, Voltaire would start releasing his material under the moniker "Aurelio Voltaire", in order to avoid confusion with other acts also called "Voltaire".

According to Voltaire on his website, the album's name is derived from a comment made by a fan on his official Facebook page, in which the fan compared Voltaire's music to the "audio equivalent of 'riding a black unicorn down the side of an erupting volcano while drinking from a goblet filled with the laughter of small children'". Amused, Voltaire decided this would be the title of his new album, save for the word "goblet" being supplanted by "chalice".

The album's cover art was provided by fantasy/concept artist Michael "Daarken" Lim. Daarken is well known for designing characters and providing concept art for RPGs, role-playing video games and MMORPGs such as Magic: The Gathering, Kingdoms of Amalur: Reckoning and Warhammer Online: Age of Reckoning, among many others.

Riding a Black Unicorn... would be the first album by Voltaire to count with the appearance of guest musicians instead of his usual live band; among them are Franz Nicolay of The World/Inferno Friendship Society (who previously worked with Voltaire on his 2008 album To the Bottom of the Sea), Brian Viglione of The Dresden Dolls and Violent Femmes (a common collaborator for Voltaire since his previous album Hate Lives in a Small Town), Melora Creager of Rasputina (in her first collaboration with him) and David J, of now-defunct post-punk/gothic rock band Bauhaus fame.

== Background ==
According to comments made by Voltaire on his official YouTube channel, "Innocent" was conceived as an anti-bullying song. Voltaire was constantly bullied during his childhood in New Jersey.

"The Mechanical Girl" was inspired by Hayao Miyazaki's 1986 film Castle in the Sky.

== Track listing ==
All tracks are written by Voltaire.

| No. | Title | Length |
|---|---|---|
| 1. | "Riding a Black Unicorn..." | 5:07 |
| 2. | "Innocent" | 4:47 |
| 3. | "The Mechanical Girl" | 3:51 |
| 4. | "The Straight-Razor Cabaret" | 3:27 |
| 5. | "Don't Go by the River" | 4:30 |
| 6. | "The Dirtiest Song That Ain't" | 4:49 |
| 7. | "Cathouse Tragedy" | 4:27 |
| 8. | "Oh, Lord (Wake the Dead)" | 6:33 |
| 9. | "When the Circus Came to Town" | 4:18 |

== Personnel ==
- Voltaire – vocals, guitar
- Brian Viglione – drums
- Melora Creager – cello
- David J – bass
- Franz Nicolay – accordion
- The Red Hook Ramblers – horns
- Ben Lively, Maxim Moston, Hannah Thiem – violins
- Daarken (Michael Lim) – cover art
