= Billy & Mandy's Big Boogey Adventure =

2007 animated adventure fantasy comedy film

- DVD cover
- Created by: Maxwell Atoms
- Written by: Nina Bargiel; Jeremy Bargiel; Maxwell Atoms
- Story by: Maxwell Atoms
- Directed by: Shaun Cashman; Kris Sherwood; Gordon Kent; Matt Engstrom; Eddy Houchins; Sue Perrotto; Robert Alvarez; Russell Calabrese; Phil Cummings; Mike Lyman; Christine Kolosov
- Voices of: Greg Eagles; Richard Horvitz; Grey DeLisle; Vanessa Marshall; Fred Willard; George Segal
- Composers: Gregory Hinde; Drew Neumann
- Country of origin: United States
- Original language: English

Production
- Executive producer: Maxwell Atoms
- Producer: Louis J. Cuck
- Editor: Illya Owens
- Running time: 80 minutes
- Production company: Cartoon Network Studios

Original release
- Network: Cartoon Network
- Release: March 30, 2007

Billy & Mandy's Big Boogey Adventure is a 2007 American made-for-television animated adventure fantasy comedy film based on the animated series The Grim Adventures of Billy & Mandy. Like the regular show itself, the film was produced by Cartoon Network Studios.

It premiered on Cartoon Network on March 30, 2007 and was released to DVD on April 3, 2007.

== Plot ==
Two weeks ahead in the future dystopian Endsville, "Lord of Horror", an evil being, orders robotic duplicates of Billy and Mandy called Billybot and Mandroid to go back in time to eliminate their human counterparts and prevent them from reaching a powerful hand-like artifact in the Lord of Horror's possession before his past self does.

Two weeks prior, Grim is sued for dereliction of duty and misuse of his powers by his old rival, the Boogey Man, the former having failed to reap General Skarr because of Billy and Mandy's interference. Grim, Billy, Mandy, and Irwin are set to be exiled by the Underworld Court and placed in the custody of Boogey, with Grim being stripped of his powers and Numbuh 3 from Codename: Kids Next Door becoming his court-appointed replacement. Boogey reveals it was part of his plan to steal Horror's Hand, an artifact capable of bringing people's deepest fears to life and transforming anyone who conquers their fear into the scariest and most powerful being in existence; Boogey himself believes that with its power, children will fear him once again.

Grim and the children escape and plan to obtain the Hand for themselves for their own respective reasons. They encounter a pair of blind cyclopes, but escape and rescue Mandy from Boogey when he kidnaps her. Both groups eventually reach where the Hand is held; Horror the Ancient, a living statue and source of the Hand, having channeled his fears within it and cutting it off in an attempt to make himself brave. To obtain the Hand, the two rivaling groups must embark on a race across the Cannibal Run – the most dangerous section of the River Styx – as well as facing their worst fears.

Grim and the children win. Billy, Irwin, and Mandy are easily subdued by their respective worst nightmares, leaving Grim to claim the Hand unaffected, revealing he goes through his worst nightmare every day living with Billy and Mandy. The Hand however is almost immediately stolen by Boogey, who uses it to scare Grim so badly that he explodes. Believing he has won, Boogey is shocked when Grim promptly reforms himself. As everyone laughs at him, Boogey realizes the Hand is making his worst nightmare – confronting the fact that he is not scary at all – a reality, and suffers several humiliating accidents. Grim reveals he had actually turned the Hand's power off right after he picked it up, to make Boogey think his fear had come to life, ultimately proving Boogey was not ever scary at all.

Mandy demands the Underworld Court to reinstate Grim as the Grim Reaper because he saved the world from a future ruled by Boogey, which the court agrees to in part because Numbuh 3 was too much of an optimist to actually reap anyone in their view. In the end, Billy from the future appears before them to warn that if Mandy had used Horror's Hand, she would have taken over the world in two weeks, becoming the Lord of Horror from his time. Grim decides to put the Hand in his trunk to ensure that the future never comes to pass. Subsequently, Boogey is discovered to have become afraid of everything having suffered "a few too many hits on the noggin" during his humiliation. Future Billy goes back to the future to make sure that things are set right.

The credits show the aftermath of the film, including Mandy becoming the new captain of Boogey's ship, Numbuh 3 starting her own Reaper-for-hire service that results in people laughing at her, Dracula stealing Grim's scythe for use as a golf club, Irwin being bedridden for getting infected with mono and cooties after kissing Mandy, and Boogey living in fear since his defeat.

In the post-credits, future Billy went back to the future to find that it has not changed as Fred Fredburger has obtained Horror's Hand from Grim's magic trunk and took over the world as the new Lord of Horror, having conquered his fear of running out of nachos.

== Cast ==
- Grey DeLisle - Mandy / Mandroid / Older Mandy / Milkshakes / Some Kid
- Greg Eagles - Grim / Sperg / Pirate #6
- Richard Steven Horvitz - Billy / Billybot / Harold / Pale Ghoulish Juror / Chippy the Squirrel / Future Billy
- Vanessa Marshall - Irwin / Pirate #5 / Unicorn / Future Irwin
- Maxwell Atoms - I'll Cut You Guy / Pirate #2 / Horrorbot / Burnt Skeleton Guard
- George Ball - Peequay
- Jane Carr - Bride of Frankenstein
- Greg Ellis - Creeper / Horror's Hand / Pirate #3 / Paperboy
- Bart Flynn - Giant Cyclops / Ugly Pirate
- C. H. Greenblatt - Fred Fredburger / Pirate #4
- Jennifer Hale - Gladys
- Dorian Harewood - Older Irwin
- Phil LaMarr - Space Villain / Glacier of Evil / Dracula / Judge Roy Spleen / Underworld Cop
- Rachael MacFarlane - Two-Headed Parrot
- George Segal - Horror
- Armin Shimerman - General Skarr / Pirate #7
- James Silverman - Executioner / Pirate #1
- Lauren Tom - Numbuh 3
- Billy West - Pirate #8 / Miniature Cyclops / Spider Clown Mailman / Beast Master
- Fred Willard - The Boogey Man

== Production ==
Series creator Maxwell Atoms originally pitched "Billy & Mandy vs. the Martians" as a direct-to-video film, but Cartoon Network did not want a science fiction theme and the pitch was made into a standard episode of The Grim Adventures of Billy & Mandy. Creating the film was the first time that Atoms had created anything with a length of over one hour. That, along with creating the regular season, was challenging for him. Boogey Man was chosen as the villain for the film because he was a lesser villain that had a relationship with Grim. This was because Atoms was given the idea to follow a storyline similar to Star Trek II: The Wrath of Khan by a Cartoon Network representative.

The role of Numbuh 3 was originally supposed to be taken up by an entirely new Grim Reaper character, with Atoms having Pamela Anderson in mind for the character, as one of the crew members worked on Stripperella. Anderson was contacted and expressed interest for the role, but was ultimately rejected by the studio's casting department thinking that the actress wasn't marketable enough. Atoms created a shortlist of alternatives, including Marilyn Manson, Drew Barrymore and Elijah Wood, while Cartoon Network proposed more high-profile actors such as Angelina Jolie.

Unable to decide on finding an actor to play the role in time for production, Atoms decided to use a character from a Cartoon Network series and picked Hoagie Gilligan (a.k.a. Numbuh 2) from Codename: Kids Next Door to serve as Grim's replacement because his childish innocence would serve as contrast to the role of the Grim Reaper and his presence would also serve as a tease for the upcoming crossover special The Grim Adventures of the Kids Next Door. However, at the suggestion of that show’s creator Tom Warburton, this was changed to Numbuh 3 taking Grim's place. Atoms also used some Nintendo references in the later part of this TV movie, such as when Boogey Man kidnaps Mandy he makes a "warp pipe" appear and its SFX is used when he goes into it.

The title track "Land of the Dead" was written and performed by Voltaire. It is Voltaire's second collaboration for The Grim Adventures of Billy & Mandy, the first being on the episode "Little Rock of Horrors" with the song "Brains!"; "Land of the Dead" would later feature as the opening track of Voltaire's albums Ooky Spooky and Spooky Songs for Creepy Kids. The film's end credits also feature "Boogie Wonderland" by Earth, Wind & Fire. The film is most famous for its original song "Scary-O".

== Home media ==
The film was released on DVD by Warner Home Video in the United States on April 3, 2007. The DVD contains both anamorphic wide screen and modified full screen versions with 5.1 surround sound and regular stereo sound. Special features include the season-two episode "Bully Boogie" – Boogey's debut episode – and interviews with the voice actors. As of 2023, it has yet to be available to stream on iTunes, Amazon Prime, and HBO Max (except in Latin America).

== Reception ==
Dennis Prince of DVD Verdict reviewed the movie saying, "All told, Billy & Mandy's Big Boogey Adventure is a gift from Atoms, and an indulgence of all the goodness and gooeyness that has made the series a top draw on Cartoon Network. Despite the boogers, bare buttocks, and boorish humor, this court finds no real crime has been committed. Case dismissed." MaryAnn Johanson of the Flick Filospher reviewed the movie saying "'Full-length movie. Full of boogers!' promises the blobby green sticker on the DVD. And it's true. But somehow, the tons of gross-out potty humor manages to be delightfully goofy – perhaps it's the irresistibly cheerful spin cartoonist Maxwell Atoms puts on his demented twisting of kiddie cartoons." It was nominated for an Annie Award for Best Music in an Animated Television Production. Common Sense Media gave the movie 2/5 stars and is meant for kids over the age of 8 calling it "undeniably gross and just as undeniably funny".
