= Ooky Spooky =

Studio album by Voltaire
- Released: July 31, 2007
- Recorded: Planet Grey
- Genre: Dark cabaret; comedy rock
- Length: 42:37
- Label: Projekt Records
- Producer: George Grant

Voltaire chronology
Live! (2006)	Ooky Spooky (2007)	To the Bottom of the Sea (2008)

Professional ratings
Review scores
Source	Rating
Allmusic	4/5 stars

Ooky Spooky is the fifth studio album by Cuban American dark cabaret singer Voltaire. It was released on July 31, 2007 by Projekt Records, being the last Voltaire album to do so, since his contract with Projekt Records expired. Voltaire has stated that he wanted this album to be more fun and silly, as opposed to his more serious albums, Almost Human (2000) and Boo-Hoo (2002).

Voltaire worked with Amanda Palmer of The Dresden Dolls on the song "Stuck with You", which is about an unhappily married couple who cannot divorce because of their religion.

Live versions of the songs "Cantina", "Zombie Prostitute..." and "Hell in a Handbasket" have already been released on Live!. A live version of "Hell in a Handbasket" also appeared on Zombie Prostitute..., as did the track "Zombie Prostitute...", and a demo of "Cantina". Also appearing on the Maxi-CD was the Spanish version of the song "Day of the Dead". The album is available on iTunes.

"Land of the Dead" was originally written for The Grim Adventures of Billy & Mandy direct-to-TV film Billy & Mandy's Big Boogey Adventure. Voltaire previously worked for The Grim Adventures of Billy & Mandy with the song "Brains!", in the episode "Little Rock of Horrors".

The cover features Voltaire in a black and purple sombrero with a silver bottom holding a skeleton. The O's in the title are replaced by skulls

== Track listing ==
All lyrics are written by Voltaire; all music is composed by Matthew Goeke, Gregor Kitzis, Glenn Sorino and Voltaire (except where noted).

No.	Title	Length
1.	"Land of the Dead"	1:58
2.	"Zombie Prostitute..."	3:14
3.	"Cannibal Buffet"	3:55
4.	"Day of the Dead"	3:36
5.	"Blue-Eyed Matador"	4:43
6.	"Bomb New Jersey"	3:20
7.	"Cantina"	5:49
8.	"Stuck with You" (featuring Amanda Palmer)	4:32
9.	"Dead"	3:26
10.	"Reggae Mortis" (Forrest/Voltaire)	3:26
11.	"Hell in a Handbasket"	4:35
