= Ernst Knaack =

German Communist and resistance fighter (1914-1944)

Ernst Knaack (4 November 1914 - 28 August 1944) was a German Communist and resistance fighter against the Nazi Germany régime.

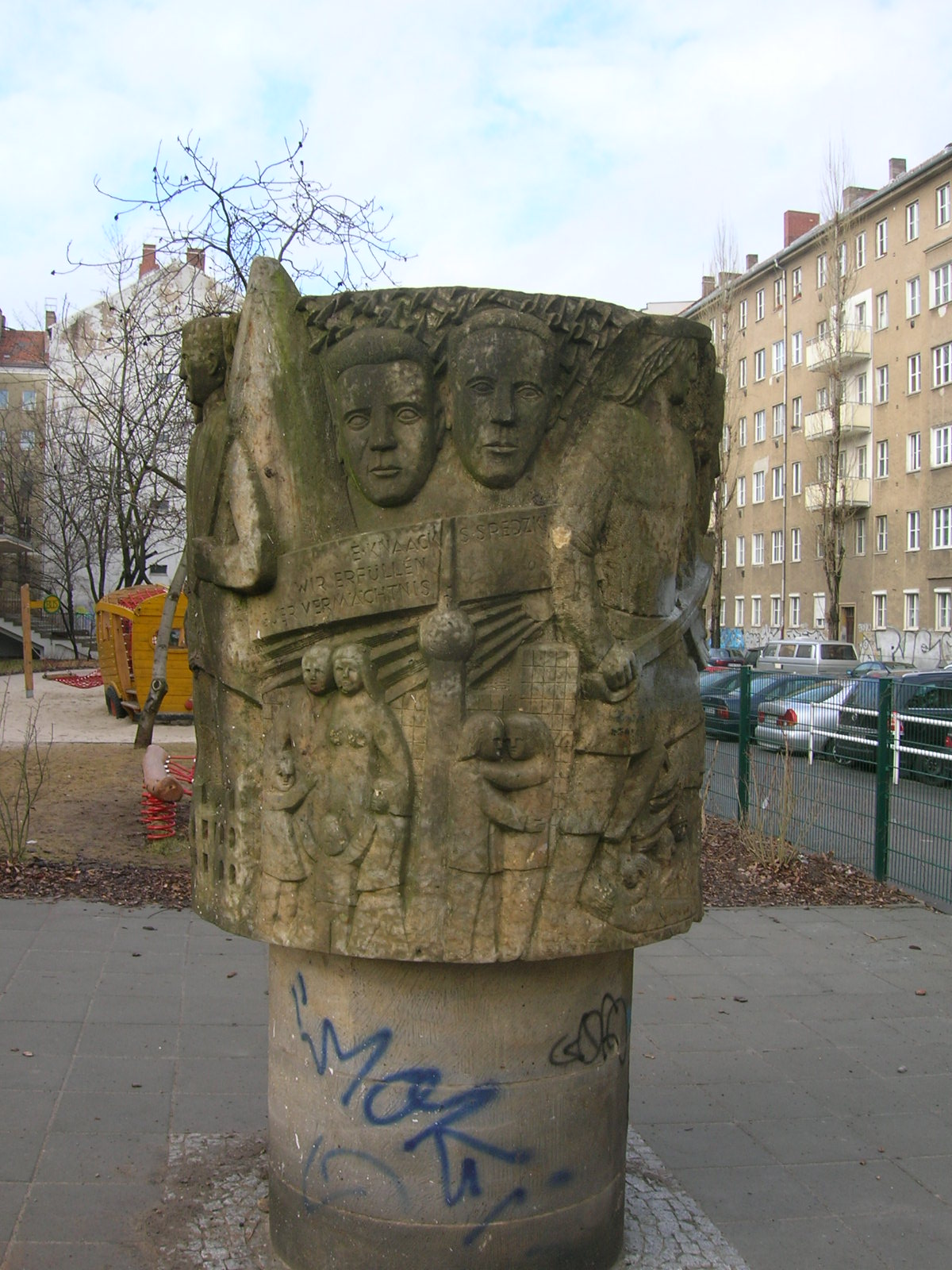
Memorial to Ernst Knaack und Siegmund Sredzki in Berlin

== Biography ==
Knaack was born in Berlin.

In 1928 he joined the Communist Youth League of Germany (KJVD). He performed the function of leader for agitation and propaganda in the Berlin neighbourhood of Prenzlauer Berg. From 1933, he fought illegally against Nazi domination.

In 1935, he was arrested for the first time, and on 2 October 1936, the Berlin Superior Court of Justice (Kammergericht) sentenced him to two years at hard labour in a Zuchthaus. After being released, Knaack joined the illegal organization around Robert Uhrig. On 26 March 1942, he was once again arrested by the Gestapo and taken to Sachsenhausen concentration camp, where he stayed more than two years until his trial. On 6 July 1944, the Volksgerichtshof handed down a death sentence to Knaack. He was executed at Brandenburg-Görden Prison in Brandenburg an der Havel.

Knaackstraße, the Ernst Knaack Youth Centre – later known as the Knaack Klub (Greifswalder Straße 224 in Prenzlauer Berg, Berlin) – and the Ernst Knaack Fourth Polytechnic Secondary School (Kastanienallee in Prenzlauer Berg) are named after Ernst Knaack. The stele "Traditionen der deutschen Arbeiterklasse" ("Traditions of the German Working Class") by Heinz Worner (Knaackstraße 53–67 in Prenzlauer Berg) is dedicated to the murdered antifascists Ernst Knaack and Siegmund Sredzki.
