= Living Targets =

Studio album by Beatsteaks
- Released: August 13, 2002
- Recorded: Minirock Studio, Cologne, Germany; Tritonus, Berlin, Germany
- Genre: Punk rock Alternative rock
- Length: 38:52
- Label: Epitaph Records
- Producer: Uwe Sabirowsky; Billy Gould

Beatsteaks chronology
Launched (2000)	Living Targets (2002)	Smack Smash (2004)

Singles from Living Targets
- 1. "Summer" Released: 21 January 2002; 2. "Let Me In" Released: 3 June 2002

Professional ratings
Review scores
Source	Rating
AllMusic	link

Living Targets is the third album by German punk rock band, Beatsteaks. It was released in August 2002 on Epitaph Records. There was one line-up change from the previous album – Torsten Scholz took over bass duties from Alexander Roßwaag. The album featured more hard rock tracks than previous efforts, including songs which were far slower and more melodic and structured. It aided the band's breakthrough into the mainstream which was completed on 2004's Smack Smash – released on Epitaph Records and WEA.

== Track listing ==
1. "Not Ready to Rock" (Teutoburg, Götz, Kurtzke) – 1:27
2. "God Knows" (Teutoburg, Baumann) – 2:32
3. "Let Me In" (Teutoburg, Baumann) – 3:32
4. "Soothe Me" (Götz) – 2:30
5. "Above Us" (Teutoburg, Kurtzke, Baumann, Götz) – 3:03
6. "This One" (Teutoburg, Baumann) – 2:47
7. "Disconnected" (Teutoburg, Kurtzke, Baumann) – 3:05
8. "A-Way" (Götz, Scholz) – 3:40
9. "Mirrored" (Kurtzke, Scholz) – 3:48
10. "Run Run" (Teutoburg, Baumann) – 2:55
11. "To Be Strong" (Teutoburg) – 2:49
12. "Summer" (Teutoburg, Baumann, Götz, Kurtzke) – 6:40
- Track 12 is only actually 3:25, the remainder is a hidden track, "Yeah!"

== Credits ==
- Arnim Teutoburg-Weiß – vocals, guitar
- Peter Baumann – guitar
- Bernd Kurtzke – guitar
- Torsten Scholz – bass
- Thomas Götz – drums
- Alexander Freund – cello on "Mirrored"
- Pamela Falcone – backing vocals on "Yeah!"
- Engineered by Gerd Krueger
- Assistant engineered by Torsten Otto

=== Tracks 1, 3, 4, 6, 9, 12 ===
- Recorded and mixed at Minirock Studio, Cologne, Germany
- Produced by Uwe Sabirowsky

=== Tracks 2, 5, 7, 8, 10 ===
- Recorded at Tritonus, Berlin, Germany
- Produced by Billy Gould
