= Siegmund Sredzki =

German Resistance fighter (1892-1944)

Siegmund Sredzki (30 November 1892 – 11 October 1944) was a German Resistance fighter against the Nazi regime.

== Life ==
Born in Berlin, Sredzki was a lathe operator and in 1918, he joined the Independent Social Democratic Party of Germany (USPD). In 1920, he joined the Communist Party of Germany (KPD). He worked in leading positions in leftwing organizations, such as member of the Reich leadership of the League of Proletarian Freethinkers and leader of the Federation of the Friends of the Soviet Union, Berlin District. After Adolf Hitler and the Nazis seized power in Germany, Sredzki was active in the resistance struggle. He was detained several times in 1933 and 1934. On 7 December 1934, he was arrested by the Gestapo, and on 9 June 1936, he was sentenced by the Berlin Superior Court (Kammergericht) to five years in labour prison (Zuchthaus). After his sentence ended in 1939, Sredzki was taken to Sachsenhausen concentration camp and held there. In 1944, together with 26 other German and French antifascists, he was murdered by the SS.

== Honours ==
Since 31 January 1952, a street in the Berlin borough of Prenzlauer Berg has been named after him: Sredzkistraße. From 1974 until 1991, a school, the 23rd Polytechnic Secondary School, also in Prenzlauer Berg, bore his name. When the school was closed in 1991 and the building converted for use as a primary school, the name was changed.

The stele "Traditions of the German Working Class" by Heinz Worner (Knaackstraße 53–67 in Prenlauer Berg, on the same street as the aforesaid school) is dedicated to the murdered antifascists Ernst Knaack and Siegmund Sredzki.
