= The Black Labyrinth / A Requiem For the Goblin King =

The Black Labyrinth / Requiem for the Goblin King

Studio album by Voltaire
- Released: December 26th, 2022
- Genre: Dark cabaret
- Length: 90:25
- Label: Mars Needs Music
- Producer: Voltaire

Voltaire chronology
What Are The Oddz? (2019)	The Black Labyrinth / Requiem for the Goblin King (2022)	Summerween Surf (2024)

The Black Labyrinth / Requiem for the Goblin King is the thirteenth studio album by Cuban American dark cabaret singer Voltaire, released on December 26, 2022. The album is a tribute to David Bowie and acts as a sequel to the 1986 film, Labyrinth, recorded with 15 musicians that have worked with Bowie in the past.

On September 2, 2022, Voltaire released the first single of the album, Oubliette, with the album releasing 3 months later.

When asked about the album's story elements, Voltaire said "It was written very, very much to be a musical. It has a full story, just like any musical. And there are songs that, while they’re all sung by me as it’s my 13th album, they are written to be sung by different characters from the story, After years of recording this record, the moment it was finished, I put it on. I sat back and I closed my eyes and I pretended I was watching this play on Broadway and I wept openly. And there were moments where I cried because it’s sad. There were moments where I cried because it’s beautiful, but I cried a lot."

The Black Labyrinth features 15 musicians that worked with David Bowie in the past, including Mike Garson, Gail Ann Dorsey, as well as members of My Chemical Romance and the Trans Siberian Orchestra.

== Background ==
The tracks Little White Lies and What Will We Do? first premiered on Voltaire's YouTube channel in 2021, two years before the album's release, with pre orders made available on December 8, 2022.

A novel based on the book which expands on the story of the album was announced, but subsequently delayed, announced on Voltaire's website in his FAQ section.

The final track is a medley of the David Bowie songs Magic Dance and Underground.

== Track listing ==
No.	Title	Length
1.	"The King is Dead"	6:13
2.	"A Song for the Goblin King" (Instrumental)	4:42
3.	"Friends in the Dark"	5:02
4.	"I Laugh in the Face of Death"	3:23
5.	"Someone Like You"	4:07
6.	"Little White Lies"	3:34
7.	"Oubliette"	4:01
8.	"No Honor Among Thieves"	3:38
9.	"Better Than You"	4:11
10.	"As High as the Wind Blows"	4:27
11.	"Keep On Moving"	4:20
12.	"The Soldier's Blade"	5:13
13.	"What Will We Do?"	4:51
14.	"Kill the Beast"	3:49
15.	"Safe In Your Love"	4:33
16.	"The King of Villains / When I Said I Was Evil"	5:37
17.	"The Shadow that Falls Over You"	5:07
18.	"It Was Music All Along"	4:29
19.	"As the World Falls Down"	3:42
20.	"Magic Dance Underground / A Labyrinth Medley"	5:26
Total length:		90:25

== Personnel ==
- Vocals - Aurelio Voltaire
- Trombone - Dave Gibson, Egor Remmer & Lev Borovskiy
- Cello - Rebecca Subero, Artem Litovchenko & Lizzy Munson
- Timbales - Alejandro Perez Morales
- French Horn - Meredith Moore
- Trumpet - Dima Ivasenko, Lev Borovskiy & Kiku Collins
- Marimba - Ostap Tomchuk
- Percussion - Ostap Tomchuk
- Oboe - Daniel Walton
- Bassoon - Eric Heidbreder
- Horns Arranger - Dima Faustov
- Saxophone - Dima Faustov & Steve Elson
- Tuba - Dima Faustov & Joe Exley
- Bagpipes - Ally Crowley-Duncan
- Hammered Dulcimer - Rob Wakefield
- Mandolin - Rob Wakefield
- Whistle - Reggito Dell’ Anima
- Erhu - Jacko Cheng
- Harp - Harpsae
- Accordion - Franz Nicolay
- Guitar - Scott Helland & Mark Plati
- Organ - Sean Spada, Henry Hey & Mark Plati
- Electric Guitar - Ray Toro, Nicky Moroch, Gerry Leonard & 1 more
- Piano - Sean Spada, Henry Hey & Mike Garson
- Flute - Donny McCaslin & Steve Elson
- Bass - Erdal Kızılçay, Mark Plati & Gail Ann Dorsey
- Graphic Design - DreaD Art, Iren Horrors & Abigail Larson
