= Dragons of Faerûn =

Dungeons & Dragons supplement by Eric L. Boyd

- Genre: Role-playing game
- Publisher: Wizards of the Coast
- Publication date: August 2006
- Media type: Print
- ISBN: 0-7869-3923-0

Dragons of Faerûn is a supplement to the 3.5 edition of the Dungeons & Dragons role-playing game.

== Contents ==
Dragons of Faerûn is an accessory for the Forgotten Realms which details some of the setting's most notorious dragons and dracoliches, and also presents information on dragon-related organizations such as the church of Tiamat and the Cult of the Dragon. The book also includes ready-to-play adventures, new traps and treasures found within the lairs of dragons, new spells for dragons, and new monsters.

== Publication history ==
Dragons of Faerûn was written by Eric L. Boyd and Eytan Bernstein, and published in August 2006. Cover art was by Lucio Parrillo, with interior art by Anne Stokes, Daarken, Gonzalo Flores, Tomás Giorello, Eric M. Gist, Fred Hooper, Howard Lyon, William O'Connor, and Jim Pavelec.
