= Raised by Bats =

Studio album by Voltaire
- Released: February 21st, 2014
- Recorded: 2013
- Genre: Comedy rock; deathrock; horror punk
- Length: 40:37
- Label: Mars Needs Music
- Producer: Voltaire

Voltaire chronology
BiTrektual (2012)	Raised by Bats (2014)	Heart-Shaped Wound (2017)

Raised by Bats is the tenth studio album by Cuban American dark cabaret singer Voltaire, released in 2014. The album's production was crowdfunded by Voltaire's fans all over the world via a successful Indiegogo campaign; it would reach US$53,793, surpassing its originally intended goal of US$10,000. The album is a major departure of Voltaire's musical style; instead of his usual dark cabaret style, Raised by Bats is more deathrock-oriented. According to Voltaire in his official website:

In truth, it's a tour of all of the kinds of music I loved growing up. There are songs on this album that are goth rock, deathrock, new wave, New Romantic, dark wave and dark folk. It's the album I've always wanted to make. Some of the songs were written as far back as 1984, when I was 17 years old!

Raised by Bats is, thus far, the album by Voltaire that most features guest musicians: among them are Ray Toro of My Chemical Romance fame, Craig Adams of The Mission and The Sisters of Mercy, Melora Creager of Rasputina and much more.

== Background ==
The track "The Night" was previously featured on Voltaire's 2000 album Almost Human; he first wrote it in 1988.

"The Conqueror Worm" takes its name and lyrics from Edgar Allan Poe's eponymous poem.

"The Devil and Mr. Jones" is a tribute to American actor Doug Jones, famous for portraying Abe Sapien in Guillermo del Toro's Hellboy films (Del Toro is also mentioned on the song's lyrics). He also portrayed the faun in Pan's Labyrinth.

"Sacrifice" was written in memory of one of Voltaire's friends, who killed herself when both were teenagers.

"Captains All" is a tribute to one of Voltaire's idols, British musician Adam Ant, famous for being the frontman of now-deceased post-punk/new wave band Adam and the Ants.

== Track listing ==
No.	Title	Length
1.	"Raised by Bats"	3:30
2.	"Oh, My Goth!"	3:12
3.	"The Night"	4:51
4.	"The Masquerade"	4:38
5.	"The Devil and Mr. Jones" (feat. Julia Marcell)	5:40
6.	"Sacrifice"	5:23
7.	"The Conqueror Worm"	4:18
8.	"Wake Up (From This Horrible Dream)" (feat. Chibi)	4:53
9.	"Never"	4:32
10.	"Captains All"	4:39

== Personnel ==
- Voltaire — vocals
- Julia Marcell — additional vocals (track 5)
- Chibi (of The Birthday Massacre) — additional vocals (track 8)
- Brian Viglione — drums
- Ray Toro — guitars
- Knox Chandler — guitars
- Craig Adams — bass
- Melora Creager — cello
- Frank Morin — guitars
- Emilio Zef China — bass, violin
- Olya Viglione — organ
- Chris Ianuzzi — keyboards
- Armen Ra — theremin
- Michael Komarck — cover art

Marcell, Creager and Viglione collaborated with Voltaire previously.

Guest vocals in "Oh, My Goth!" were provided by The Crüxshadows, Bella Morte, Ego Likeness (on their second collaboration with Voltaire since 2004's Then and Again), Zombina and the Skeletones and Angelspit.
