= Then and Again =

Studio album by Voltaire
- Released: October 26, 2004
- Genre: Dark cabaret
- Length: 37:49
- Label: Projekt Records

Voltaire chronology
Boo Hoo (2002)	Then and Again (2004)	Deady Sings! (2004)

Professional ratings
Review scores
Source	Rating
AllMusic	link

Then and Again is the fourth studio album by Cuban American dark cabaret singer Voltaire, released on October 26, 2004, through Projekt Records. Contrasting with most of Voltaire's albums, on which his songs are mostly humorous and satirical, Then and Again features more serious and introspective songs, dealing about love, heartbreak and the human condition.

"Goodnight Demonslayer" is a lullaby composed by Voltaire for his son Mars, then an infant.

"Lovesong" is a cover of The Cure.

The song "Halló elskan mín" is partially sung in Icelandic. It is an homage to one of Voltaire's ex-girlfriends, who hails from Iceland.

Donna Lynch and Steven Archer of Ego Likeness provide additional vocals for the tracks "Believe" and "Wall of Pride". Archer also plays the electric guitar.

== Track listing ==
No.	Title	Length
1.	"Crusade"	4:52
2.	"Lovesong" (The Cure cover)	3:28
3.	"The Happy Song"	4:41
4.	"Wall of Pride"	3:55
5.	"Welcome to the World"	3:41
6.	"Believe"	3:47
7.	"Halló elskan mín" (Icelandic for "Hello, my dearest")	3:20
8.	"Born Bad"	5:17
9.	"Goodnight Demonslayer"	4:48

== Personnel ==
- Voltaire — vocals, acoustic guitar
- Gregor Kitzis — violin
- Matthew Goeke — cello
- George Grant — bass
- Stephen Moses — drums
- Steven Archer — electric guitar

Guest vocals were provided by Ego Likeness. They would work with Voltaire again in his 2014 album Raised by Bats.
