= Call of the Jersey Devil =

2013 novel by Aurelio Voltaire

- First edition
- Author: Aurelio Voltaire
- Language: English
- Genre: Horror novel
- Publisher: Spence City
- Publication date: 2013
- Publication place: United States

Call of the Jersey Devil is a 2013 horror novel by writer Aurelio Voltaire.

== Plot ==
Six people become stranded in the Pine Barrens and battle the Jersey Devil.
