= Launched (album) =

Studio album by Beatsteaks
- Released: March 7, 2000
- Recorded: 1999; K4 (Elektro Automatisch), Berlin, Germany
- Genre: Hardcore punk, punk rock
- Length: 49:57 inc hidden track
- Label: Epitaph Records
- Producer: Uwe Sabirowsky; Beatsteaks

Beatsteaks chronology
'48/49' (1997)	Launched (2000)	'Living Targets' (2002)

Professional ratings
Review scores
Source	Rating
Allmusic	link

Launched is the second album from German hardcore punk band, Beatsteaks. It was released in March, 2000 on Epitaph Records and follows the band's debut release 48/49 in 1997 on XNO Records. The album contains an interesting half acoustic cover version of a song by heavy metal band, Manowar, "Kings of Metal". The band stayed with Epitaph Records for their next release, Living Targets, in 2002.

== Track listing ==
- All songs written by Beatsteaks unless stated otherwise
1. "Panic" – 2:38
2. "We Have to Figure It Out Tonight" – 1:36
3. "Shut Up Stand Up" – 2:44
4. "Shiny Shoes" – 2:59
5. "2 O'Clock" – 2:58
6. "Happy Now?" – 3:51
7. "Mietzi's Song" – 2:44
8. "Excited" – 1:24
9. "...And Wait" – 3:45
10. "Filter" – 2:20
11. "Fake" – 3:14
12. "Go" – 2:09
13. "Kings of Metal" (Joey DeMaio) – 4:35
14. "Schluß mit Rock 'n' Roll" – 12:54
- Track 14 is only actually 3:12 – the rest of the track starts at 4:15 and is taken from rehearsals

== Credits ==
- Arnim Teutoburg-Weiß – vocals, guitar
- Peter Baumann – guitar
- Bernd Kurtzke – guitar
- Alexander Roßwaag – bass
- Thomas Götz – drums
- El Köfte and Holly – guest musicians on "Mietzi's Song" and "Schluß mit Rock 'n' Roll"
- Recorded in 1999 at K4 (Elektro Automatisch), Berlin, Germany
- Produced and engineered by Uwe Sabirowsky
- Co-produced by Beatsteaks
- Mixed at Nucleus Studio, Berlin, Germany
- Mastered by Howie Weinberg at Masterdisk, New York City, USA
