= 48/49 =

Studio album by Beatsteaks
- Released: February 1, 1997
- Recorded: November 1996; Berlin, Germany
- Genre: Hardcore punk
- Length: 48:42
- Label: XNO Records

Beatsteaks chronology
| 48/49 (1997) | Launched (2000) |

48/49 is the debut album from German hardcore punk band, Beatsteaks. It was released in February, 1997. The band signed with Epitaph Records for their next release, Launched, in 2000.

== Track listing ==
All tracks are written by Beatsteaks, except where noted.

| No. | Title | Length |
|---|---|---|
| 1. | "Unminded" | 2:35 |
| 2. | "Fragen" | 3:08 |
| 3. | "Why You Not..." | 2:34 |
| 4. | "Different Ways" | 3:22 |
| 5. | "48/49" | 2:49 |
| 6. | "Fool" | 1:53 |
| 7. | "Schlecht" | 1:49 |
| 8. | "Me Against the World" | 2:54 |
| 9. | "Indifferent" | 4:22 |
| 10. | "Barfrau" | 0:14 |
| 11. | "You Walk" | 2:49 |
| 12. | "Disillusion" (includes a hidden track) | 20:13 |

== Credits ==
- Arnim Teutoburg-Weiß – vocals, guitar
- Peter Baumann – guitar
- Bernd Kurtzke – guitar
- Alexander Roßwaag – bass
- Stefan Hircher – drums
