= Knaack club =

Coordinates: 52.5303°N 13.4258°E

- Type: Nightclub, Concert venue
- Traded as: Knaack-Klub
- Founded: 1952
- Defunct: 31 December 2010
- Headquarters: Prenzlauer Berg, Berlin, Germany

Knaack (German: Knaack-Klub) was a nightclub in Prenzlauer Berg in Berlin, Germany. It opened in 1952 as a youth club and occasional disco. It then developed during the East German era into a live music venue where many notable German bands played regularly. Gentrification of the surrounding area in the late 2000s led to complaints about the club's noise from residents of newly constructed apartment buildings nearby. A court case resulted, placing restrictions on the noise levels, which the owners judged made the club financially untenable, resulting in its closure on 31 December 2010. After efforts to reopen in another district, the club secured new premises in Prenzlauer Berg and announced in February 2013 that they planned to reopen in 2016. Delays due to construction permits pushed these plans back to 2018. As of 2023 no construction has begun.

== History ==
The club was located on Greifswalder Straße in East Berlin on the site of a former brewery. It began in 1952 as the Ernst Knaack youth centre (German: Ernst-Knaack-Jugendheim) and featured table tennis and occasional concerts. It was named after Ernst Knaack, a local communist resistance fighter. It began to include music and dancing in the late 1960s and 1970s. After years of playing mostly recorded music, the ground floor became a concert venue in 1992 and eventually hosted around 100 concerts a year. Among the bands who regularly played live at the venue were German groups such as Rammstein, who played one of their first concerts at the venue, and Die Toten Hosen. International artists such as Snow Patrol and Keane also appeared at the venue.

=== Closure ===
In the late 2000s, the district—during the time of the GDR and into the 1990s an area favored by punks and bohemians—underwent gentrification. Construction of new dwellings near the club resulted in complaints about the club's noise from the new residents. This led to a temporary halt to concerts, which resulted in the number of clubbers falling from 1000 to 400 on a Saturday, threatening the club's economic viability. The planners of the apartment block were blamed for this, as they had failed to take the noise levels from the club into account when designing the apartment block. Nevertheless, in June 2010 a court ruled in the residents' favour, instructing the club to finish all events by 23:00 and restricting it to noise levels which would register at no higher than 25 decibels in the living rooms of the residents after that time. The club responded by installing new soundproofing in the building to reduce the noise levels, but the reduced noise levels inside the club proved unpopular with clubbers.

Eventually, the owners decided that these new conditions made operating a club untenable and decided to close, seeking a new location. The last concert took place on 4 December 2010, with a band from Munich, From Constant Visions, and one from Berlin, Contravolta, the last acts to play at the venue. The owners subsequently made an unsuccessful attempt to reopen the venue in the Kreuzberg district of Berlin.

The closure of Knaack and similar clubs as a result of economic changes resulted in a new term being coined in Berlin: clubsterben or "club death." Local politicians, concerned by possible economic effects of this, created a 1 million euro music fund to assist clubs in similar situations.

=== Proposed reopening ===
In February 2013, the club announced that it had secured new premises on vacant land on Eberswalder Straße in the Prenzlauer Berg district near Mauerpark. Press reports at that time suggested it would reopen in 2016 as Knaack-Kulturhaus. The club celebrated its future rebirth with a two-day festival in August 2013. The importance of Mauerpark to public utility companies meant that these plans were postponed, with the club planning to reopen in 2018. Plans for this venue include a concert hall with a capacity of 1,000 people, a club with a capacity for 200, as well as rehearsal rooms, restaurant, cinema and music library.

As of October 2021, the reopening was still planned but on hold, with further delays caused by the COVID-19 pandemic in Germany and a lawsuit of BVG against the plans. In June 2023 it was announced that BVG and the district of Pankow had reached an agreement and the club would reopen in a new location.
