= Aurelio Voltaire =

Cuban-American musician

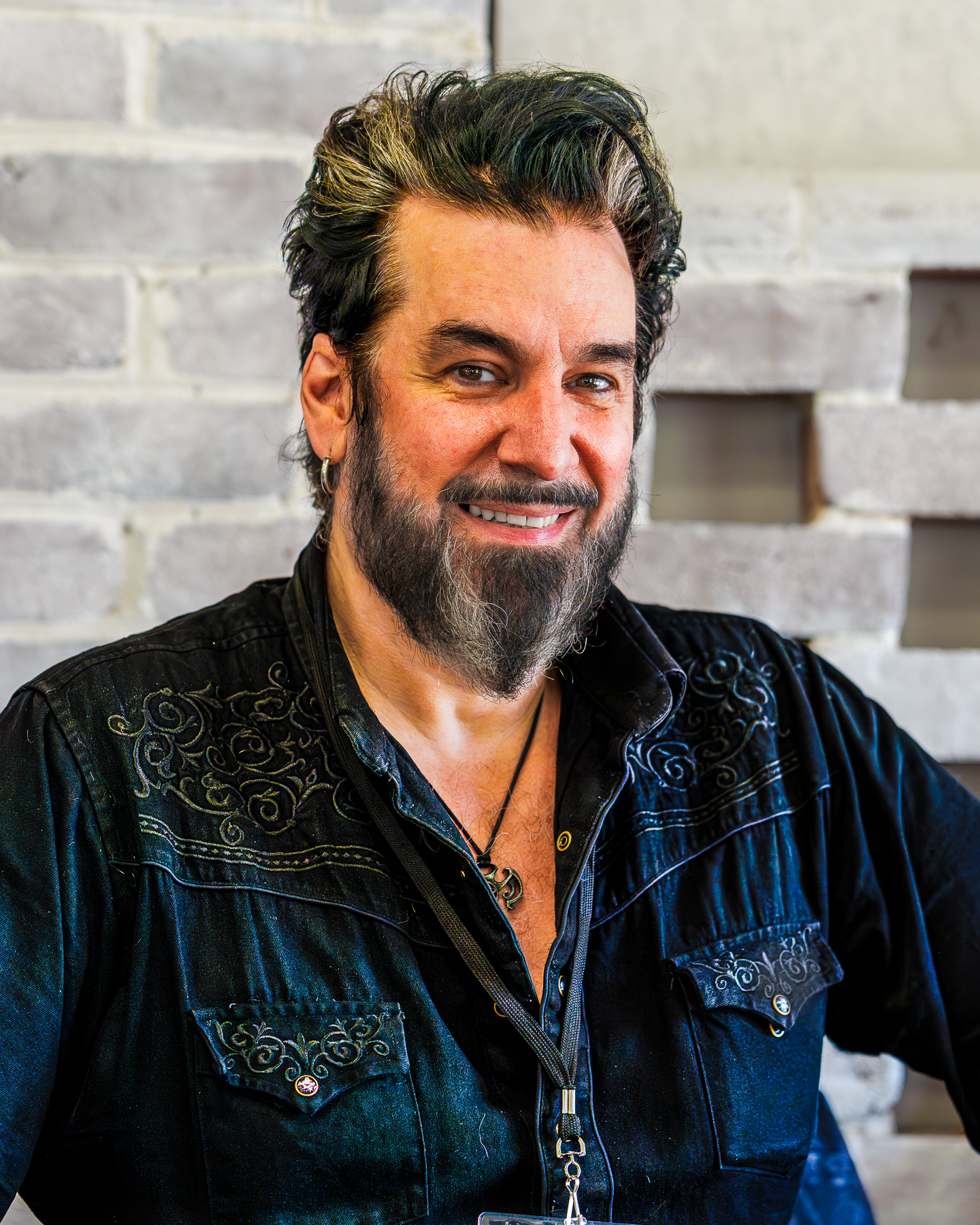
- Voltaire at RavenCon in 2026

Background information
- Also known as: Voltaire
- Born: Aurelio Voltaire Hernández; January 25, 1967 (age 59); Havana, Cuba
- Genres: Dark cabaret; comedy rock
- Occupations: Musician; singer; composer
- Instruments: Vocals; guitar
- Years active: 1998–present
- Labels: Projekt; Mars Needs Music; Dancing Ferret
- Formerly of: The Oddz
- Website: voltaire.net

Aurelio Voltaire Hernández (born January 25, 1967), professionally known as Aurelio Voltaire or simply Voltaire, is a Cuban-American musician, singer, composer, author, and animator. Known for his gothic style of dress and music, Voltaire is considered a leading figure in the dark cabaret music genre. He has released 13 studio albums, including Riding a Black Unicorn Down the Side of an Erupting Volcano While Drinking from a Chalice Filled with the Laughter of Small Children (2011), BiTrektual (2012), and Raised by Bats (2014). He has also created songs for the Cartoon Network animated series The Grim Adventures of Billy & Mandy (2001–2007), and will star as the vampire Duke in The Vampair Series (2026).

In 1997, Voltaire wrote and illustrated the six-issue Sirius Entertainment comic book series Chi-Chian, and created a Flash animated webseries of the same name for the Sci-Fi Channel website. He also authored the graphic novel Oh My Goth! (2002), and has written such books as What Is Goth? (2004) and Paint It Black: A Guide to Gothic Homemaking (2005). The latter book led to a YouTube webseries titled Gothic Homemaking, in which Voltaire shares information related to gothic homemaking and decor.

== Name ==
In the past, when asked about his real name, Voltaire avoided the question or implied that his real name is in fact Voltaire.

Voltaire chose to use his middle name as his performance name because his namesake "saw through the hypocrisies of humanity and commented on them through satire. In essence, he was able to educate people about the world around them by making them laugh."

According to the School of Visual Arts where he was previously employed as an instructor, Aurelio Voltaire's real name is Aurelio Voltaire Hernández.

Starting with his 2011 album, Riding a Black Unicorn..., Voltaire added his first name to his stage name, changing it to "Aurelio Voltaire" for the following reason: "I got tired of there being other people releasing albums as Voltaire. There's an indie band in Germany and some American guy who makes instrumental hip hop. Like, do these people not do a fuckin' Google search before naming their bands? Anyway, it was just easier to distinguish myself from them by using my first name."

== Background ==
Aurelio Voltaire's father died when he was four months old. At ten months old, Voltaire emigrated to New Jersey with his mother and sister after his mother remarried. However, he did not enjoy residing there, stating he was a victim of bullying because of his heritage and strange hobbies and interests. At the age of ten, Voltaire was inspired by the films of Ray Harryhausen (Jason and the Argonauts, The 7th Voyage of Sinbad), and began animating on a super 8 camera. By piecing together snippets of information from fanzines, he eventually was able to teach himself how to make foam rubber animation models and animate them. His stepfather was abusive, considering Voltaire homosexual because of his strange hobbies and interests. A family friend sexually molested him from infancy into his teenage years. His girlfriend at the time committed suicide, which made him consider doing the same. Before he followed through, he promised himself to live one more day, doing and saying what he wanted to do and say. This allowed him to stand up to the people who were bullying him, and instantly elevated his self-esteem. At the age of 17, he ran away from home and moved to New York City. His first job there was an animator with Parker Brothers. Voltaire says that he loves New York, and that the only other place he would be happy living is Tokyo.

== Musical style and career ==
Voltaire's music has strong roots and connections to European folk as well as other influences such as the goth scene. However, many listeners find his music hard to classify. Although it has a sound reminiscent of European folk music, many people claim it to be dark wave; perhaps as this is a label often given to many other artists from Projekt Records, and a word often used to mean many things by the label themselves. His music has also been linked to cabaret, with Lexicon Magazine using the term "goth cabaret", possibly referring to dark cabaret, a term often used to describe some bands Voltaire cites as his influences. Voltaire has also been linked to the steampunk scene with Victorian-era horror related subjects, and some of his visual and music styling, and in recent years he has become a favorite at major steampunk conventions such as the Steampunk World's Fair. New wave has also been used to describe Voltaire's music by some reviewers. Voltaire describes his own music as "Music for a parallel universe where electricity was never invented and Morrissey is the queen of England". He says that bands and artists who influenced his music are Rasputina, Morrissey, Tom Waits, Cab Calloway and Danny Elfman.

The first band that Voltaire played in (during junior high school) was called "First Degree". At this age, he was a fan of Duran Duran, but then began listening to gothic music, most notably bands such as Bauhaus and The Cure. It was not until later that he began participating in the goth scene; it did not at first occur to him that there was a goth scene at all.

As an adult, Voltaire formed a band which included a violin, a cello, drums, and himself as the vocalist and the acoustic guitar player. Within a year, Projekt Records signed them and by June 1998 they released their first album called The Devil's Bris. Two years later their second album, Almost Human was released.

One of Voltaire's popular hits is "Brains!", a song written for the Cartoon Network show The Grim Adventures of Billy & Mandy, aired in the episode "Little Rock of Horrors". He also wrote "Land of the Dead" for Billy and Mandy's Big Boogey Adventure, which plays in the opening sequence.

As an avid fan of Star Trek, Aurelio Voltaire frequently attends science fiction conventions, and released a four track EP called Banned on Vulcan. It was a set of comedy recordings poking fun at characters from the show.

On the side, Voltaire is also the lead vocalist of a New York City based new wave quintet known as The Oddz.

Voltaire performed a musical special for Artix Entertainment in their MMO game AdventureQuest Worlds, altering some of his songs in To the Bottom of the Sea to suit their standards. Over 32,000 players attended. It was released at 8:00 pm on Friday the Thirteenth of March 2009.

On September 2, 2011, Voltaire released his eighth studio album: Riding a Black Unicorn Down the Side of an Erupting Volcano While Drinking from a Chalice Filled with the Laughter of Small Children. Participating musicians include Rasputina frontwoman Melora Creager on cellos, Brian Viglione on drums, former Bauhaus bassist David J on bass and Franz Nicolay on accordion.

On September 2, 2012, Voltaire released his ninth studio album, BiTrektual. It contains songs parodying Star Trek, Star Wars and Doctor Who, and featured guest appearances by Jason C. Miller, Tim Russ, Garrett Wang and Robert Picardo.

In 2014, his tenth album, Raised by Bats, was released. Contrasting with the dark cabaret instrumentation of most of his album, Raised by Bats is more death rock—and gothic rock-inflected, and it counted with guest appearances by Ray Toro of My Chemical Romance, Craig Adams of The Mission, Julia Marcell and much more.

2022's The Black Labyrinth marked yet another musical departure, veering into a more David Bowie-inspired direction. It not only served as a tribute to the late singer, but also acted as a spiritual sequel to Labyrinth, with a plotline spread throughout its twenty songs. Many musicians who had worked with Bowie throughout his various eras also worked on the album.

=== Band members ===
Although often credited and pictured as a soloist, Voltaire has a band. His band occasionally performs in live acts, but does not feature on his live album, Live!. The current lineup is:

- Vocals/Guitar: Aurelio Voltaire
- Violin: Hannah Thiem
- Violin: Maxim Moston
- Violin: Ben Lively
- Cello: Melora Creager
- Drums: Brian Viglione
- Bass: David J
- Horns: The Red Hook Ramblers
- Accordion: Franz Nicolay
- Banjo: Smith Curry
- Tuba: Joe Tuba

== Television ==
Voltaire was hired for his first directing job in 1988 with MTV, creating the "MTV-Bosch" station ID in the style of Hieronymus Bosch. The stop motion tour of the hellish Garden of Earthly Delights won several awards including a Broadcast Design Award. This station ID was included in a capsule of 21st century media that was shot into space. He has also made station IDs for clients such as Cartoon Network, Sci-Fi Channel and its Animation Station block, USA Network, and Nickelodeon.

After publishing a six-issue comic book series titled Chi-Chian through Sirius Entertainment, Voltaire created a station ID for the Sci-Fi Channel featuring the eponymous character. This led the network to commission Voltaire to create an animated series featuring the character for their website. The resulting Flash animated series, Chi-Chian, debuted on the website in November 2000 and concluded in May 2001; a total of 14 episodes were produced.

He previously taught stop motion animation at the School of Visual Arts in New York City, as well as animating, directing, and singing.

Voltaire has written two of his songs especially for the TV show The Grim Adventures of Billy & Mandy: "Brains!" and "Land of the Dead".

Appeared on the Discovery Channel series, Oddities, in 2012, buying a "slice of brain" for a music video prop.

On his YouTube channel The Lair of Voltaire, Voltaire publishes the video series Gothic Homemaking, a guide to gothic style.

On May 26, 2025, it was announced that Voltaire would voice the character of Duke and write a song for the pilot of the YouTube net series "The Vampair Series".

Also in 2025, Voltaire hosted a reality horror game show called, "Graveyard Games", which can be found on the streaming service Tubi.

== Film ==
Voltaire has acted in movies. One movie he appeared in as the character "Verrill", was Model Hunger (2016). He additionally contributed a cameo as the exorcist Altair in The VelociPastor in 2017.

Voltaire appeared in visual companion content for American Murder Song as Unwed Henry. The first video featuring his character was released at the 2016 Steampunk World's Fair and later on YouTube.

Voltaire co-directed the 2026 film, The Demonatrix with co-director Jeff Ferrell. He also played the part of "Father Veto" opposite Hannah Fierman's dominatrix, Lita.

== Art and writing career ==
In addition to Chi-Chian, Voltaire has also produced a comic book series called Oh My Goth!, also known as OMG!, which started as his own eight-page religious tracts inspired by Jack Chick. Stories include him being chased by minions of Satan as they try to prevent him from playing his next show. These short pieces often led to information about his next show. After two issues of the Chi-Chian series were published, he convinced Sirius Entertainment to publish Oh My Goth!, which included four issues that were later collected into a trade paperback. Voltaire has also made a sequel to the OMG series called Oh My Goth! Humans Suck! An Oh My Goth! musical was going to be produced at some point, but was scrapped or shelved for unknown reasons. Despite the lack of any updates, is still listed as "in development".

Voltaire has also produced a DEADY series as well as releasing books such as What Is Goth? (2004), Paint It Black: A Guide to Gothic Homemaking (2005), and "Call of the Jersey Devil", a novelization of a script of the same name.

In early 2004, for his DEADY comic book, Voltaire signed a deal with Toy2R. The first toy that was created was a 2-inch posable DEADY key chain for the company's "Qee Bear". It was released at San Diego Comic Con and sold out. A second figure, an 8-inch DEADY figure was created in January 2005 and could be redeemed on aqworlds for a rare non-member only digital pet. In June 2007 the Deady Minigame was released on ebilgames.com, a site hosting various minigames created by Artix Entertainment. AE's Massively multiplayer online game AQWorlds also featured a Friday the 13th event featuring songs by Voltaire. Voltaire voiced his in-game persona for the occasion. In 2008, Voltaire shot the Animation short film X-Mess Detritus. The movie was the third film of his directorial career; the others are Transrexia (1993), Rakthavira (1994) and Transrexia II (2008).

In mid-2013, Voltaire released the novel Call of the Jersey Devil, and in late 2014 he released The Legend of Candy Claws. The latter is about a bat that steals candy from naughty children on Halloween and gives it to good children on Christmas. He is currently writing a novel based on his 2022 album The Black Labyrinth.

== Personal life ==
Voltaire married his long-time girlfriend, Jayme, on October 1, 2009, at the Angel Orensanz Center in New York City. Voltaire has a son, Mars, from a previous relationship, born in 1998.

On September 25, 2013, Voltaire announced on his official blog, that he and his wife were to be divorced. Saying, "On October 1st of this year, my wife and I would be celebrating our 4th year wedding anniversary. Unfortunately, it's not to be. After nearly four years of marriage and a couple more of dating, we are parting ways. It saddens me so deeply that things didn't work out. It's been a difficult process for both of us to come to this decision, one that I really don't wish upon anyone. Nothing is worse than seeing your best friend in pain."

As of 2022, he is currently engaged to Mexican-Japanese singer, Mayumi Toyoda.

== Books ==
- Voltaire (2002). Oh My Goth! Version 2.0. Sirius Entertainment. ISBN 1-57989-047-4
- Voltaire (2003). Oh My Goth!: Presents the Girlz of Goth!. Sirius Entertainment. ISBN 1-57989-061-X
- Voltaire, Chris Adams, David Fooden (2003). Chi-Chian: The Roleplaying Game. Aetherco/Dreamcatcher. ISBN 1-929312-03-2
- Voltaire (2004). Deady the Malevolent Teddy. Sirius Entertainment. ISBN 1-57989-083-0
- Voltaire (2004). Deady the Terrible Teddy. Sirius Entertainment. ISBN 1-57989-077-6
- Voltaire (2004). What Is Goth? – Music, Makeup, Attitude, Apparel, Dance, and General Skullduggery. Weiser Books. ISBN 1-57863-322-2
- Voltaire (2005). Deady the Evil Teddy. Sirius Entertainment. ISBN 1-57989-081-4
- Voltaire (2005). Paint It Black – A Guide to Gothic Homemaking. Weiser Books. ISBN 1-57863-361-3
- Voltaire (2007). Deady: Big in Japan. Sirius Entertainment. ISBN 1-57989-085-7
- Aurelio Voltaire (2013). Call of the Jersey Devil. Spence City. ISBN 1-93939-200-4
- Aurelio Voltaire (2014) The Legend of Candy Claws ISBN 1-50292-112-X
- Aurelio Voltaire (2024) Gothic Life: The Essential Guide to Macabre Style ISBN 0-76038-832-6

== Discography ==
- The Devil's Bris (1998)
- Almost Human (2000)
- Boo Hoo (2002)
- Then and Again (2004)
- Ooky Spooky (2007)
- To the Bottom of the Sea (2008)
- Hate Lives in a Small Town (2010)
- Riding a Black Unicorn Down the Side of an Erupting Volcano While Drinking from a Chalice Filled with the Laughter of Small Children (2011)
- BiTrektual (2012)
- Raised by Bats (2014)
- Heart-Shaped Wound (2017)
- What Are the Oddz? (2019)
- The Black Labyrinth / A Requiem For the Goblin King (2022)
- Summerween Surf (2025)

=== Compilations ===
Tracks by Voltaire also appeared on these compilation albums, sorted by year.

- Spooky Songs for Creepy Kids (2010)

1999

- Unquiet Grave #3 (Cleopatra Records)

Featured a remix of the song "The Man Upstairs".

2000

- Promo 11 (Projekt Records)

Featured the song "Anastasia".

2001

- Promo 12 (Projekt Records)

Featured the song "Anastasia".

- Tori Amos Tribute: Songs of a Goddess (Cleopatra Records)

Featured the song "Caught a Lite Sneeze".

2002

- Promo 17 (Projekt Records)

Featured "The Vampire Club".

- Projekt: Gothic (Projekt Records)

Featured the song "When You're Evil".

2003

- Projekt: The New Face of Goth (Projekt Records)

Featured the songs "Brains!" and "Goodnight Demon Slayer".

- Promo 21 (Projekt Records)

Featured the song "The Vampire Club".

2004

- Strange as Angels: A Tribute to The Cure (Failure to Communicate Records)

Featured the song "Lovesong".

- Holiday Single 1 (Projekt Records)

Featured the song "Peace in the Holy Land", by Voltaire, featuring Unto Ashes.

- Promo 20 (Projekt Records)

Featured the song "The Vampire Club"

- Promo 23 (Projekt Records)

Featured the song "The Vampire Club"

2005

- A Dark Noel (Projekt Records)

Featured the song "Peace in the Holy Land", by Voltaire, featuring Unto Ashes.

2006

- Where's Neil When You Need Him? (Dancing Ferret Discs)

Featured the song "Come Sweet Death", by The Oddz, with Voltaire.

- The Projekt Almost Free CD (Projekt Records)

Featured the song "Cannibal Buffet (Promo Mix)"

- .2 CONTAMINATION: A Tribute to David Bowie (Failure to Communicate Records)

Featured the song "China Girl".

- Asleep By Dawn Magazine Presents: DJ Ferret's Underground Club Mix#2 (Dancing Ferret Discs)

Featured the song "Day Of The Dead".

2007

- Almost Free CD 2007.1 (Projekt Records)

Featured the song "Zombie Prostitute".

2008

- To The Bottom of the Sea (Mars Needs Music)

Voltaire's first wholly self-produced and self-released album.
Songs from the album were performed by Voltaire through an avatar in the online game AdventureQuest Worlds
