= Turbostaat =

German punk rock band

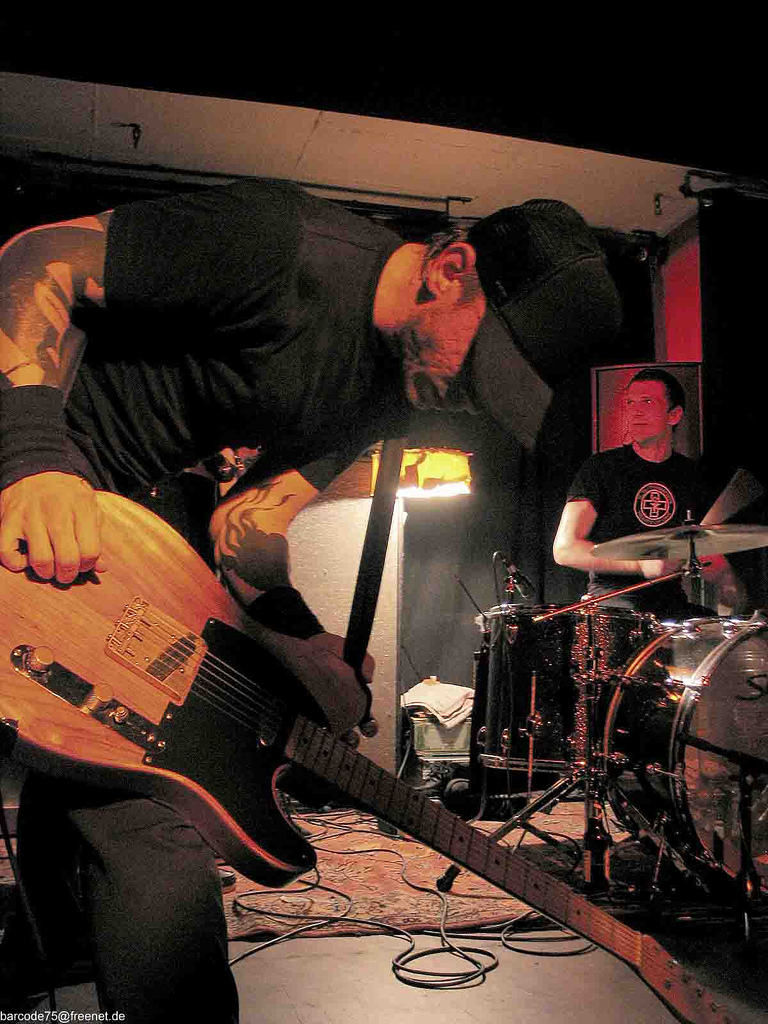
- Turbostaat in 2006 at Gleis 22, Münster

Background information
- Origin: Husum, Germany
- Genres: Punk rock
- Years active: 1999–present
- Labels: Schiffen, Same Same But Different, Clouds Hill, PIAS
- Members: Jan Windmeier; Rotze Santos; Tobert Knopp; Peter Carstens; Marten Ebsen
- Website: www.turbostaat.de

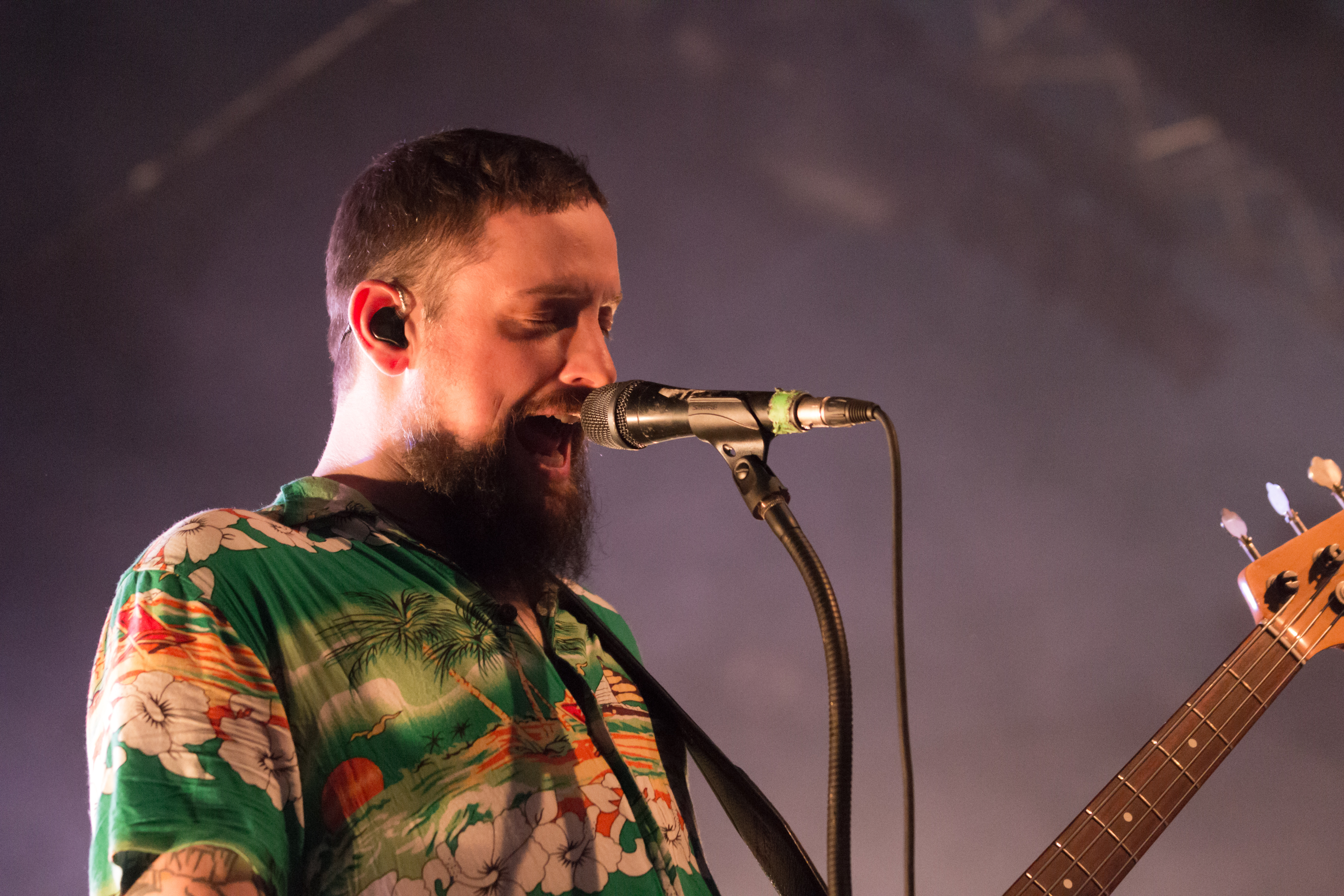
Turbostaat, Tobert Knopp, Zelt Musik Festival 2015 in Freiburg, Germany

Turbostaat is a punk rock band, established in 1999 in Husum, now based in Flensburg, Germany, Hamburg and Berlin. The band consist of its original five members.

== History ==
Turbostaat was formed in January 1999 from members of the punk rock bands, Exil, Zack Ahoi and Unabomber. Following the move of the band members from Husum to Flensburg, the album Flamingo was released in 2001 and the album Schwan in 2003 on the label Schiffen.

The performances of Turbostaat included appearances as a warm-up act for Beatsteaks, with whom the band worked on a German language lyric cover of the Fu Manchu song Hell on Wheels, which was called Frieda und die Bomben. This appeared on the Beatsteaks single Hello Joe in 2004.

In May 2004, Turbostaat toured Norway, Sweden and Finland with finish punk band Manifesto Jukebox.

At the end of 2006, after label Schiffen stopped releasing new records Turbostaat changed to the newly established label Same Same But Different and recorded the album Vormann Leiss at the end of March 2007, which was released on 17 August 2007. It marks the start of the since 2007 ongoing work and friendship relationship with berlin based producer Moses Schneider, who recommended the band to capture their live sound recording their albums live as well, what the band has adopted to their way to record/produce music unchanged until now.

In February 2008, the band announced that they were recording in a studio again, and at the 2009 Highfield Festival near Hohenfelden, the album was announced for the beginning of 2010. The band played the new songs Surt + Tyrann and Strandgut at festivals that summer.

The band's fourth album, Das Island Manöver was released on 9 April 2010, and Surt + Tyrann was released as a free download on the band's web site. - the album was recorded with producer Moses Schneider at chez cherie berlin

The band's fifth album, Stadt der Angst, was released as a double vinyl on 5 April 2013 on Clouds Hill Recordings. A cd version with bonus tracks which are not on the vinyl record exists.

Less than three years later, on 29 January 2016, Turbostaat released their sixth album, Abalonia through PIAS. The record was recorded at Hansa Tonstudios berlin with Moses Schneider and Tim Tautorat. The limited bx-set contains a 7" with previously unreleased track Der Sturm photoprints from the studio sessions and a bandana,

The live record Nachtbrot was recorded on three days in Leipzig with Moses Schneider and was released on 11 January 2019 through PIAS. The double vinyl is embedded in a hard cover book containing photos taken over 4 years by constant roadcrew member and photographer Andreas Hornhoff.

Uthlande released 17 January 2020 through PIAS and was recorded at Hansa Tonstudios berlin with Moses Schneider and Tim Tautorat. The album was listed 6th in the German top 100 charts.

== Side projects ==
Guitarist Marten Ebsen and Thomas Goetz, drummer of Beatsteaks, started the project NinaMarie. Their first EP was released under the name Scheiss. Taxi - Scheiss. Paris in March 2006.

Bassist Tobert Knopp has released several experimental/ambient records with fellow longtime collaborateur Ulf Schütte as Aosuke on labels such as dekorder together with Black to Comm, Audiolith, tape tektoniks and meudiademorte. Tobert Knopp has released a Split 7" with the band InFlux and a mini-cd called "dead crest" containing mostly harsh noise music on the tape label tape tektoniks. Knopp was the bass player in the doom/psychrock band Mountain Witch from 2011 to 2017 contributing to the albums "cold river" and "burning village" released on this charming man records. He is known to use several pseudonyms hiding on collaborations and studio work such as Klaus Hoffmann, Tut Ench Armut or Smoothy Pommes. Knopp has worked as a visual artist designing the record covers and merchandise for his band Turbostaat until his departure from visual work after finishing "stadt der angst" in 2013. He has been contributing cover artworks for The Robocop Kraus, Aosuke, Hallo Kwitten, Datashock to name a few.

== Discography ==
=== Albums ===
- 2001: Flamingo
- 2003: Schwan
- 2007: Vormann Leiss
- 2010: Das Island Manöver
- 2013: Stadt der Angst
- 2016: Abalonia
- 2019: Nachtbrot
- 2020: Uthlande
- 2025: Alter Zorn

=== Singles ===
- 2006: Haubentaucherwelpen/Pingpongpunk 7"
- 2007: Harm Rochel 7"
- 2007: Haubentaucherwelpen
- 2008: Insel
- 2010: Pennen bei Glufke
- 2013: Alles bleibt konfus 7"
- 2013: Beatssteaks / Turbostaat - Record store day 7"
- 2014: Live at Clouds Hill 10"
- 2017: Die Tricks der Verlierer 7"
