= To the Bottom of the Sea =

Studio album by Voltaire
- Released: September 23rd, 2008
- Genre: Dark cabaret; comedy rock; sea shanty
- Length: 50:11
- Label: Mars Needs Music
- Producer: Voltaire

Voltaire chronology
Ooky Spooky (2007)	To the Bottom of the Sea (2008)	Spooky Songs for Creepy Kids (2010)

To the Bottom of the Sea is the sixth studio album by Cuban American dark cabaret singer Voltaire. It was released in 2008, and would be the first album by Voltaire to be released through his then-newly founded label Mars Needs Music (named after his son, Mars). It is a loose concept album, set in the fictional country of Vorutania.

Polish musician Julia Marcell would provide additional vocals for the duet "This Sea"; Voltaire would also cover a song by her, "Accordion Player", originally present in her 2007 EP Storm.

Voltaire's son Mars is among the ones who provided additional vocals for the track "Stakes and Torches (The Uprising of the Peasants)".

Franz Nicolay of The World/Inferno Friendship Society provided the accordions for the album, in his first collaboration with Voltaire.

A music video was made for the track "Happy Birthday (My Olde Friend)"; it would be Voltaire's first music video ever.

== Background ==
"Coin-Operated Goi" is a cover/parody of The Dresden Dolls' "Coin-Operated Boy", originally written by Amanda Palmer and Brian Viglione.

Voltaire stated that he originally wrote "The Beast of Pirate's Bay" to entertain Mars and his friends during one of Mars' birthday parties, even though the version included in To the Bottom of the Sea was slightly modified; the original, unaltered version of the song would be included on the 2010 compilation Spooky Songs for Creepy Kids.

In his official YouTube channel, Voltaire discourses on the meanings of the album's songs and what inspired him to write them.

== Track listing ==
No.	Title	Length
1.	"The Industrial Revolution (And How It Ruined My Life)"	5:09
2.	"Robber Baron"	3:48
3.	"Stakes and Torches (The Uprising of the Peasants)"	3:47
4.	"Happy Birthday (My Olde Friend)"	2:52
5.	"Coin-Operated Goi" (The Dresden Dolls cover/parody)	3:33
6.	"Accordion Player" (Julia Marcell cover)	3:38
7.	"This Sea" (feat. Julia Marcell)	5:04
8.	"The Beast of Pirate's Bay"	5:02
9.	"Tempest" (instrumental)	3:41
10.	"This Ship's Going Down"	4:47
11.	"To the Bottom of the Sea"	3:50
12.	"Death, Death (Devil, Devil, Devil, Devil, Evil, Evil, Evil, Evil Song)"	5:00

== Personnel ==
- Voltaire — vocals
- Matthew Goeke — cello
- Glenn Sorino — drums, additional vocals (track 3)
- Gregor Kitzis — violin
- Franz Nicolay — accordion
- Julia Marcell — additional vocals (track 7)
- Doe Deere — piano
- Johnny Kalsi — goblet drum
- Reut Regev — trombone
- Andy Navarro, Ian Danger, Jasper Vigil, Mars — additional vocals (track 3)
