= Beatsteaks =

German rock band

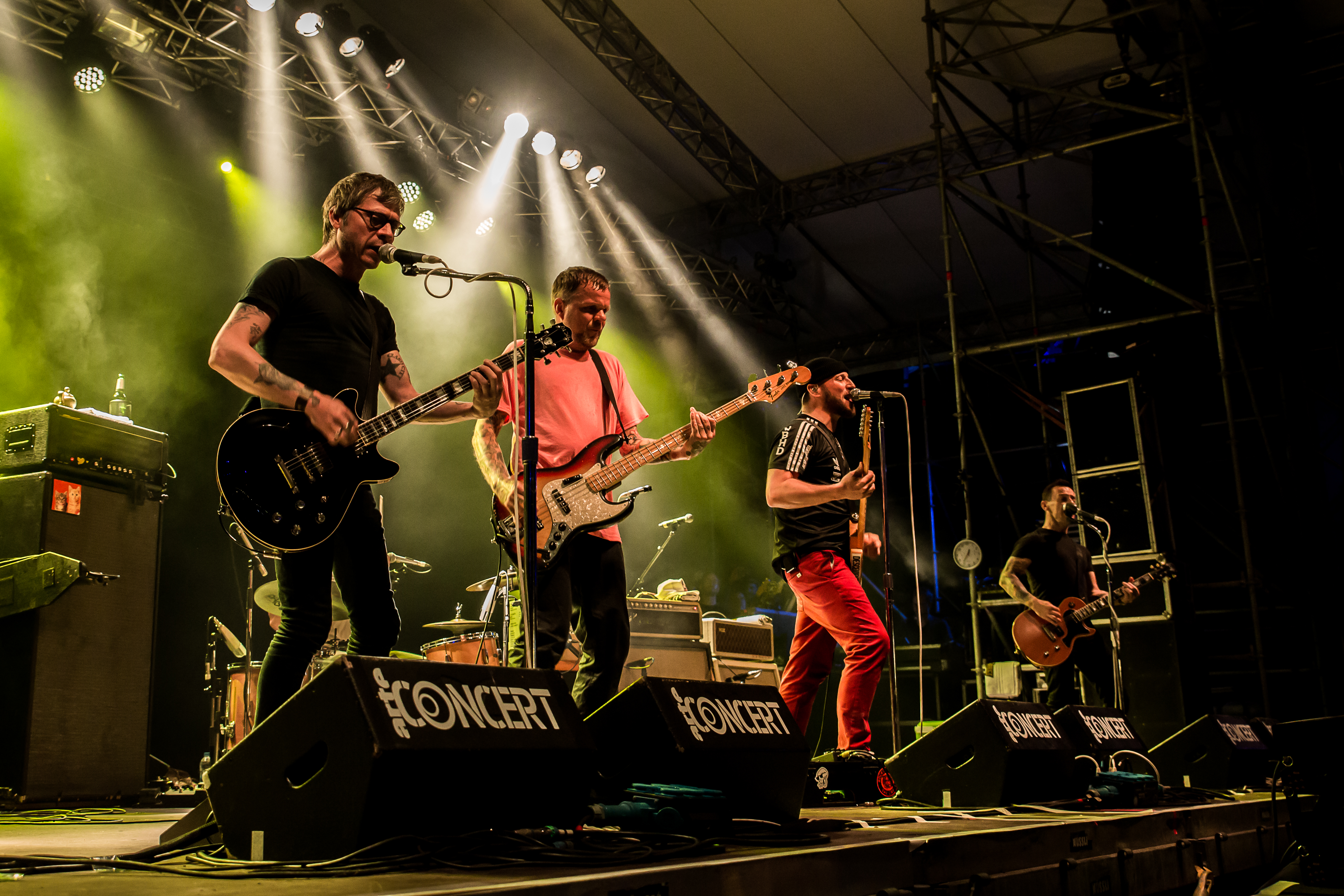
- The Beatsteaks at With Full Force 2018

Background information
- Origin: Berlin, Germany
- Genres: Alternative rock, punk rock
- Years active: 1995-present
- Labels: Epitaph, Warner
- Members: Arnim Teutoburg-Weiß; Bernd Kurtzke; Peter Baumann; Thomas Götz; Torsten Scholz
- Past members: Alexander Rosswaag; Stefan Hircher
- Website: beatsteaks.com

The Beatsteaks is a German alternative rock and punk rock band from Berlin, formed in 1995. Known for their energetic performances and distinctive sound, they have become one of the most commercially successful German punk rock groups, often mentioned alongside Die Toten Hosen and Die Ärzte. Over the years, the Beatsteaks have released several critically acclaimed and commercially successful albums, blending punk rock's raw energy with alternative rock's melodic elements. Their live-shows are particularly celebrated for their high energy and crowd interaction.

== History ==
Peter Baumann, Stefan Hircher, Alexander Rosswaag, and Bernd Kurtzke founded Beatsteaks in 1995. Shortly afterwards, Arnim Teutoburg-Weiß joined the band as singer and additional guitarist. In 1996, the band won a local music competition in SO36 and played as opening act for the Sex Pistols at a concert in Berlin. This was also the band's tenth live performance.

In 1997, the band recorded their first album 48/49, named after the number of their rehearsal space. It contains several songs in German, while the more recent albums are in English. In 1999 they released their second album, Launched, on the American punk label Epitaph Records. Thomas Götz had joined the band on drums, while on bass, Torsten Scholz replaced Alexander in 2000. This was followed by tours with Bad Religion, Die Ärzte, and Die Toten Hosen, bringing the band to a wider audience.

In 2002, they released their third album Living Targets. From this album, Beatsteaks released their first two singles "Let me in" and "Summer". At the end of 2002, the band played a concert at the Columbiahalle in Berlin and recorded the EP Wohnzimmer. Ticket holders for the Berlin concert each received a 'free' copy of the EP.

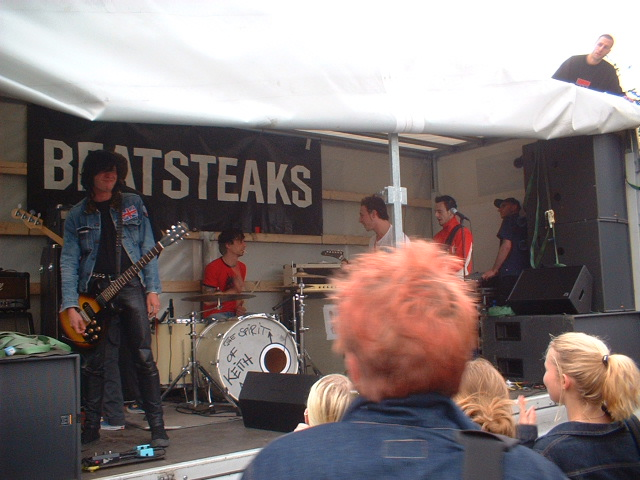
The Beatsteaks in 2002

German band Die Ärzte mentioned the Beatsteaks in their 2003 song "Unrockbar", which brought increased attention to the Beatsteaks: "Wie kannst du bei den Beatsteaks ruhig sitzen bleiben, wenn dir doch Schlagersänger Tränen in die Augen treiben?" ("How can you remain unmoved by the Beatsteaks, while Schlager singers bring tears to your eyes?").

Their breakthrough was achieved in Berlin in 2004 with the album Smack Smash, and particularly with the second single "I don't care as long as you sing" with which they won the MTV European Music Awards 2004 in the category Best German Act. At the end of 2005, they released the double DVD B-Seite, which included a self-produced documentary on the band's history, a compilation of several concerts, and music videos of the band up to this point. In 2006, they played a short summer tour, consisting of three concerts and two festival performances. Following the release of the preliminary single "Jane Became Insane" on 9 March 2007, their fifth album, .limbo messiah, appeared on 30 March 2007.

On 7 June 2007, the band played a concert for a charity foundation, as part of the Deine Stimme gegen Armut (literally "Your voice against poverty") campaign in Rostock in front of a 70,000 strong audience. One month later, on 7 July 2007, they played in the sold-out Wuhlheide in Berlin, their then-largest headlining concert, in front of approximately 17,000 fans.

In 2007, the Beatsteaks were again nominated in the category Best German Act at the EMAs and won the audience prize 1Live Krone for the best live act.

On 2 May 2008, the live album Kanonen auf Spatzen was released, which includes two CDs and one DVD in the deluxe package, or the first CD in an economy version.

Torsten Scholz said in an interview that the Beatsteaks would start writing new songs after the end of their Limbo Messiah tour in August 2008.

The Beatsteaks completed work on their most recent album Boombox, which was released on 28 January 2011. The first single from the album was "Milk & Honey", released on 2 December. On 8 April 2011, the second single, "Cheap Comments", was released. The third single off Boombox was "Automatic", co-written by Peter Fox.

In June 2011, the band announced their song "House on Fire" was to be featured on the European soundtrack of Transformers: Dark of the Moon.

In 2013, the band released the live CD/DVD Muffensausen. On 15 May 2014, they released the song "DNA" as the first single of their record Beatsteaks, which was released on 1 August 2014. "Gentleman of the Year" and "Make a Wish" are also two singles that have been released from the self-titled record.

In 2015, the Beatsteaks celebrated their 20th anniversary with two concerts at the Kindl-Bühne Wuhlheide in Berlin.

== Band members ==
Beatsteaks live at With Full Force 2018, Germany

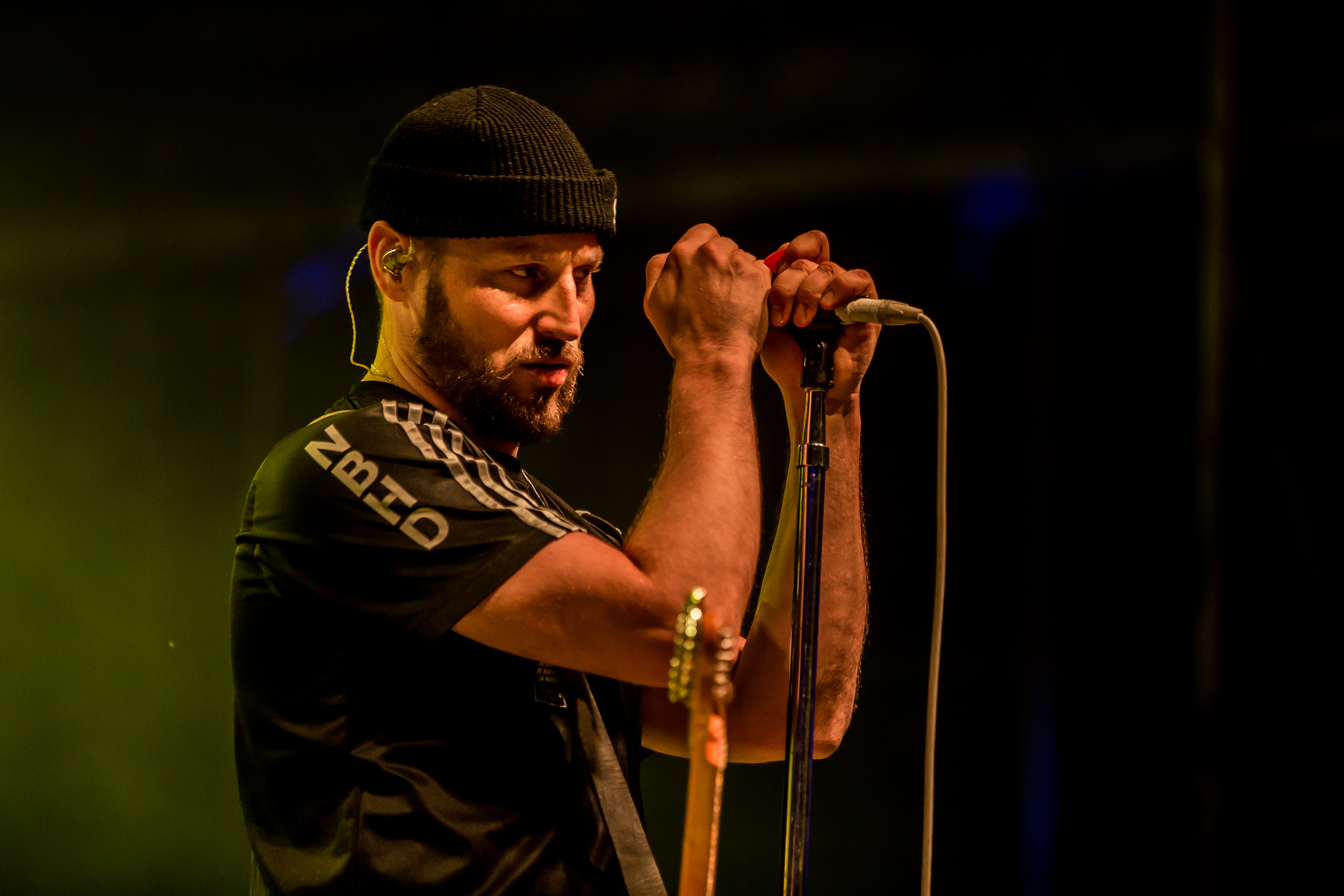
Arnim Teutoburg-Weiß

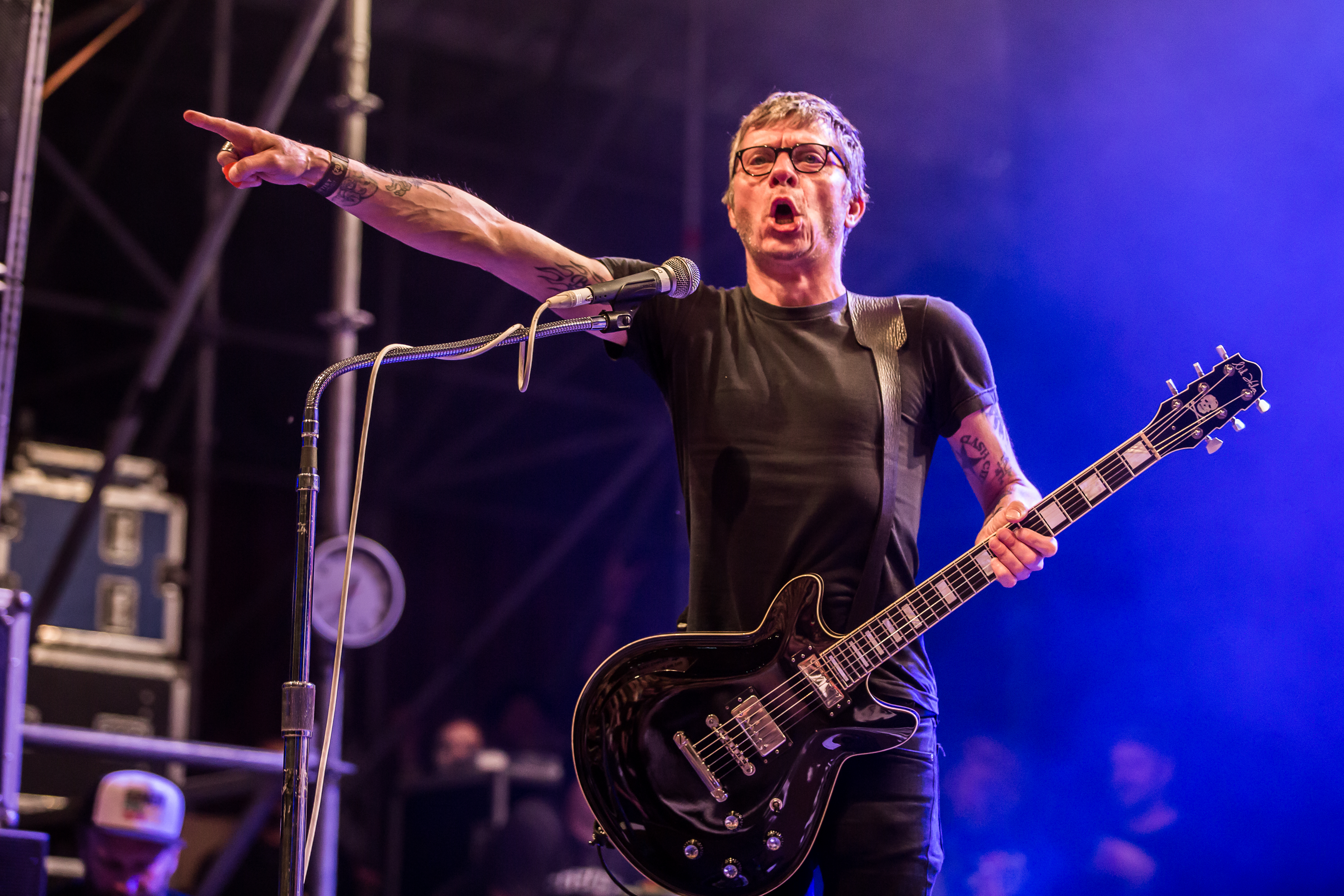
Bernd Kurtzke

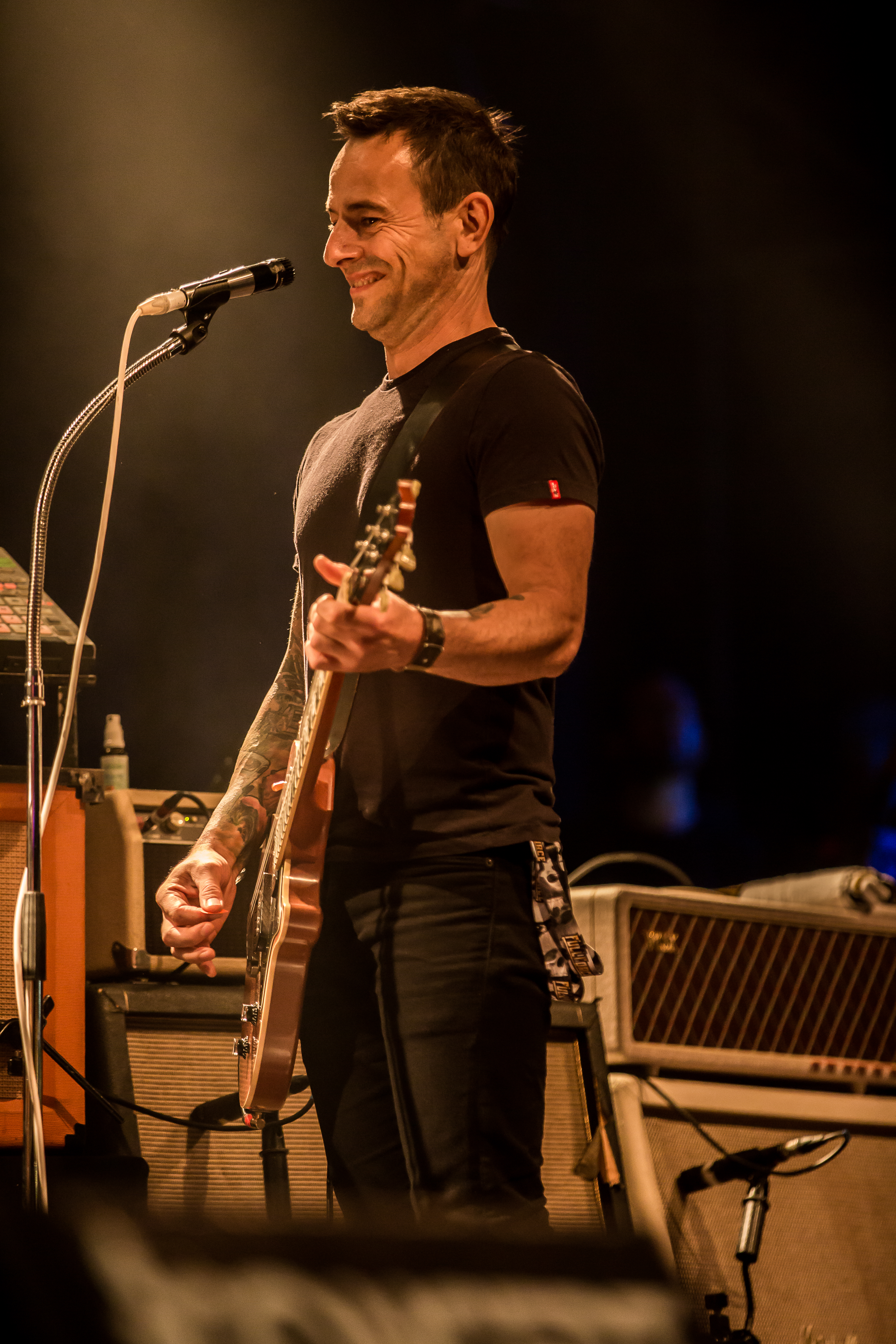
Peter Baumann

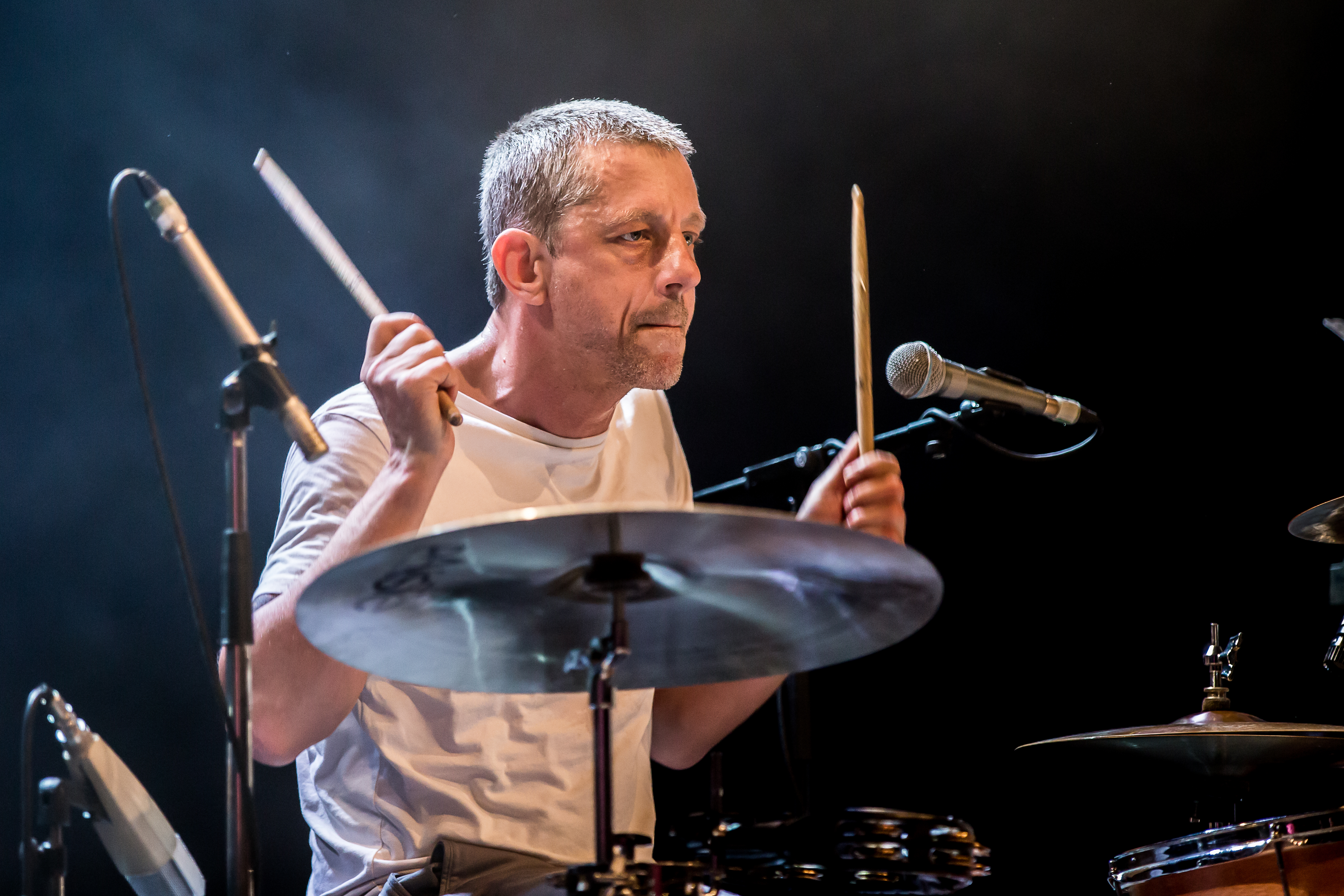
Thomas Götz

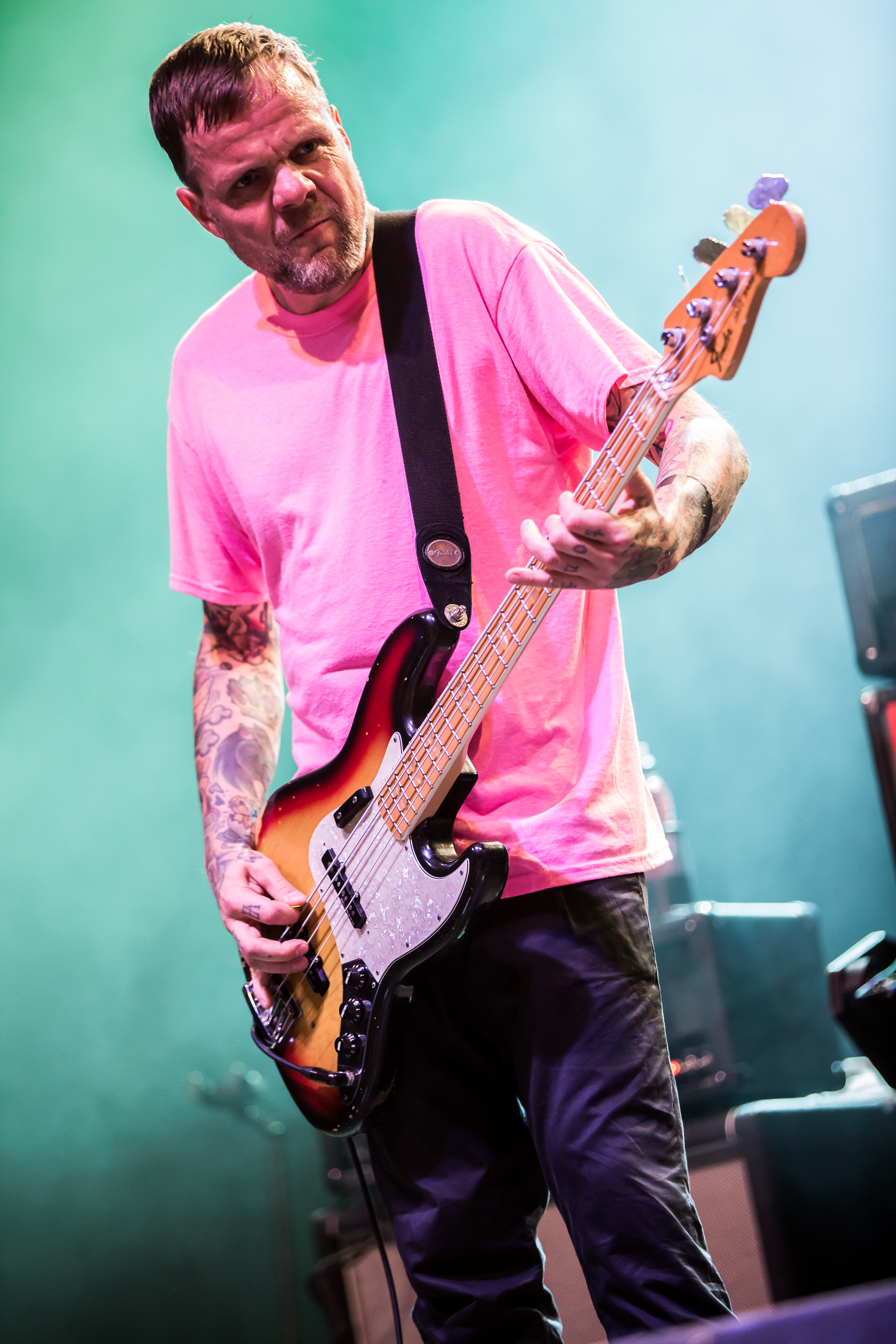
Torsten Scholz

Current members

- Arnim Teutoburg-Weiß - lead vocals, rhythm guitar (1995–present)
- Bernd Kurtzke - lead guitar, vocals (1995–present)
- Peter Baumann - rhythm guitar, lead guitar, vocals, keyboard (1995–present)
- Thomas Götz - drums, percussion, vocals (1998–present)
- Torsten Scholz - bass guitar (2000–present)

Touring members

- Dennis Kern - percussion, drums (2012–present)

Former members

- Alexander Rosswaag - bass guitar (1995–2000)
- Stefan Hircher - drums, percussion (1995–1998)

== Side projects ==
Beatsteaks drummer Thomas Götz, and Marten Ebsen, guitarist of Turbostaat, started the project NinaMarie. Their first EP was released under the name Scheiss. Taxi-Scheiss. Paris in March 2006.

Another Beatsteaks side project, involving all of the band members and emerging during the recordings of the album Limbo Messiah, is the cover band Die Roys. Swapping musical instruments and under the direction of Roy Baumann (Peter Baumann), they cover known songs, which are, according to their statement, "the best songs already written". The first five songs can be found on the singles "Jane Became Insane", "Cut Off the Top" and "Demons Galore".

== Discography ==
=== Studio albums ===
- 1997: 48/49
- 2000: Launched
- 2002: Living Targets
- 2004: Smack Smash
- 2007: .limbo messiah
- 2011: Boombox
- 2014: Beatsteaks
- 2017: Yours
- 2024: PLEASE

=== Compilation album ===
- 2015: 23 Singles

=== Live albums ===
- 2008: Kanonen auf Spatzen
- 2013: Muffensausen

=== EPs ===
- 1998: 6-11-98 Knaack, 6 November; Ticket for a concert in the "Knaack" (Berlin). The EPs (vinyl) are limited.
- 2002: Wohnzimmer-EP, 21 December; as well limited, Ticket for a concert in the "Columbiahalle" (Berlin).
- 2007: .demons galore. 5 October; 10" vinyl and CD.

=== Singles ===
- 2000: "Panic"
- 2000: "Shiny Shoes"
- 2002: "Summer"
- 2002: "Let Me In"
- 2004: "Hand in Hand"
- 2004: "I Don't Care as Long as You Sing"
- 2004: "Hello Joe"
- 2004: "Loyal to None" (limited vinyl single)
- 2007: "Jane Became Insane"
- 2007: "Cut Off the Top"
- 2007: "Demons Galore"
- 2007: "Meantime"
- 2008: "Hail to the Freaks" (live)
- 2008: "Hey du" (live)
- 2010: "Milk & Honey"
- 2011: "Cheap Comments"
- 2011: "Automatic"
- 2011: "House on Fire"
- 2013: "SaySaySay"
- 2014: "DNA"
- 2014: "Gentleman of the Year"
- 2014: "Make a Wish"
- 2015: "Ticket"
- 2017: "Hate to Love" (feat. Jamie T)

=== Music videos ===
- Atomic Love [Live] (2004)
- Hello Joe (2004)
- Hello Joe [Live] (2004)
- Frieda und die Bomben [Live] (2004)
- Hand in Hand (2004)
- I Don't Care as Long as You Sing (2004)
- Jane Became Insane (2007)
- Cut Off the Top (2007)
- Demons Galore (Ver. 1) (2007)
- Demons Galore (Ver. 2) (2007)
- Meantime (2007)
- Milk & Honey (2010)
- Cheap Comments (2011)
- Automatic (Ver. 1) (2011)
- Automatic (Ver. 2) (2011)
- House on Fire (2011)
- Say Say Say (2013)
- French Disco (2016)
- 40 Degrees (2017)
- I do (2017)
- L auf der Stirn (2017)

=== DVD ===
- 2004: Beatsteaks Live (bonus DVD, limited edition of Smack Smash enclosed)
- 2005: B-Seite (2-DVD set)
- 2007: .demons galore (bonus DVD, limited edition of .limbo messiah enclosed)
- 2008: Kanonen auf Spatzen (bonus DVD)
- 2013: Muffensausen (live DVD/live album)

== Awards ==
- 2004: MTV Europe Music Awards 2004 – Best German Act
- 2007, 2008: 1LIVE Krone – Best Live Act
- 2011: VIVA Comet – Best Video (Milk & Honey)
- 2011: MTV Europe Music Awards 2011 – Best German Act (nominated)
- 2011: 1Live Krone – Best Band
