= Ringo no Uta (Michiko Namiki and Noboru Kirishima song) =

Single by Michiko Namiki, Noboru Kirishima
- Released: January 1946 (Japan)
- Recorded: December 14, 1945
- Genre: Ryūkōka, Kayōkyoku
- Label: Nippon Columbia
- Songwriters: Hachiro Sato (lyrics); Tadashi Manjome (music)

"Ringo no Uta" (リンゴの唄, Song of the Apple) is a song featured in the 1945 Japanese film Soyokaze. It was written by poet and lyricist Hachirō Satō and composer Tadashi Manjome, who also produced the film. The song is a duet, featuring the Japanese actress Michiko Namiki and the singer Noboru Kirishima and released in January 1946. It is considered the first hit song in Japan after World War II.

"Soyokaze" (そよかぜ, Soft breeze) was released on October 11, 1945, and was the first movie produced after World War II in Japan. It was a commercial success, but was heavily criticized by movie critics. Throughout the autumn of that year, the song Ringo no Uta increased in popularity, eventually becoming more famous than the film's theme song, Soyokaze.

Ringo no Uta was first broadcast on the radio on December 10, 1945, and the 78 rpm record was released by Nippon Colombia in January 1946. Sato's lyrics express a girl's feeling in a red apple, one which matched the feelings of freedom after the war. The record achieved unprecedented sales, exceeding 100,000 copies.

== Background ==
Ringo no Uta differs compared to the initial concepts for Soyokaze. Although Soyokaze is a heartwarming film featuring a variety of songs and a love story, the film script originally had a strong nationalistic slant, intended to promote jingoistic ideas to a wartime Japanese audience. Ringo no Uta was also originally written as a wartime song with the same nationalistic tone, but was changed due to the strict censorship rules set by the then Japanese military authorities.

Lyricist Hachiro Sato intended to write a military march, but military authorities decided that the song was too not aggressive enough for a wartime song. However, the situation changed when the war ended on August 15, 1945. The plan to produce the first postwar film started just two weeks after the end of the war, in the hope that the film would offer some solace and encouragement to the Japanese people, who were experiencing desperate poverty and the ignominy due to the wartime defeat. Because of this, development of Soyokaze started, and the production of Ringo no Uta was also resumed.

Composer Tadashi Manjome, who was also the producer of the movie Soyokaze held a discussion with Sato, and the lyrics to the song were altered from their wartime original. Michiko Namiki was appointed as the leading role on Manjome and Sato's recommendation. Manjome and Sato encouraged Namiki to sing more brightly, but she had trouble with grief, losing her elder brother and boyfriend during the war.

The record became an unprecedented hit and contributed greatly to the revival of postwar Japanese culture.
