= Moses Schneider =

German music producer (born 1966)

Moses Schneider (born 1966 as Andreas Schneider) is a successful German rock music producer, known for his work with Tocotronic and Beatsteaks.

== Biography ==
Moses Schneider first worked as an assistant engineer during the mid and late eighties at Sinus Studio and from 1987 until 1989 in the Hansa Tonstudio in Berlin where he received one of his first international credits as engineer on Pixies' "Bossanova". In 1990, Schneider finally became a freelance producer. He has produced, among others, Cetu Javu, Dendemann, Fehlfarben, T.Raumschmiere, Kreator and Turbostaat. He also worked together with Susie van der Meer. He has produced several number one and gold records with the Beasteaks (Smack Smash, 2003, Boombox, 2010) and Tocotronic (Schall und Wahn, 2009) and has been nominated for the best producer (Echo awards) in 2005 and 2007.

In 2011 he has released the highly acclaimed book "Das etwas andere Handbuch or How to pimp my Übungsraum" including tips and tricks and explanations about how to record your band in your rehearsal room. During his keynote at Sonic Visions, Schneider will focus on the producer's role in developing an artist's potential in the studio and share some of his working experiences.

Celebrity support

Working with the producer of the Strokes, Gordon Raphael, was another milestone in Moses' career. Schneider helped the Strokes producer, then based in New York, to success - he inspired Raphael in everything from his choice of equipment to musical interpretation.

The alternative workbook

In addition to teaching in the form of guest lectures at various colleges, Schneider summarizes his entire knowledge of live recording in his book "the alternative workbook or how to pimp your practice room". It is now mandatory reading for live recording. From positioning the band members in the recording room to positioning the mics - in the e-book, Schneider explains techniques to produce the best possible recordings without great expense as well as descriptions and sound samples. He shares his personal approach to producing and his practical experience, including recording the internationally renowned metal band Kreator. The introduction is by Strokes producer Gordon Raphael who took his inspiration from his work with Schneider.
