= List of Dungeons & Dragons rulebooks =

In the Dungeons & Dragons (D&D) fantasy role-playing game, rule books contain all the elements of playing the game: rules to the game, how to play, options for gameplay, stat blocks and lore of monsters, and tables the Dungeon Master or player would roll dice for to add more of a random effect to the game. Options for gameplay mostly involve player options, like race, class, archetype, and background. Other options could be player equipment like weapons, tools, armor, and miscellaneous items that can be useful.

== Overview ==
Several different editions of the Dungeons & Dragons (D&D) fantasy role-playing game have been produced since 1974. This list is sorted by the edition of the game that the rulebook appeared in. Each section highlights the core rulebooks of an edition along with other types of sourcebooks such as supplemental rulebooks or campaign setting rulebooks.

Dungeons & Dragons version history
| 1974 | Dungeons & Dragons (original edition) | |
| 1977 | Advanced Dungeons & Dragons (1st edition) | Dungeons & Dragons Basic Set |
| 1981 | Advanced Dungeons & Dragons (1st edition) | Dungeons & Dragons (BX version) |
| 1983 | Advanced Dungeons & Dragons (1st edition) | Dungeons & Dragons (BECMI version) |
| 1989 | Advanced Dungeons & Dragons 2nd Edition | Dungeons & Dragons (BECMI version) |
| 1991 | Advanced Dungeons & Dragons 2nd Edition | Dungeons & Dragons Rules Cyclopedia |
| 1995 | Advanced Dungeons & Dragons (revised 2nd edition) | |
| 2000 | Dungeons & Dragons (3rd edition) | |
| 2003 | Dungeons & Dragons v.3.5 | |
| 2008 | Dungeons & Dragons (4th edition) | |
| 2010 | Dungeons & Dragons (4th edition) | Dungeons & Dragons Essentials |
| 2014 | Dungeons & Dragons (5th edition) | |
| 2024 | Dungeons & Dragons (5.5e) | |

== Original Dungeons & Dragons ==
This original version of D&D only included a few of the elements considered core to modern D&D and required the player to own several other games in order to make full use of the rules, however it is the first role-playing game and, along with its supplements, is responsible for the creation of the genre itself.

| Title | Author | Date | Pages |
|---|---|---|---|
| Dungeons & Dragons | Gary Gygax, Dave Arneson | 1974 | 3 booklets, 112 total (36, 40, 36) |
The original Dungeons & Dragons was published as a boxed set containing three separate booklets: Volume 1: Men & Magic; Volume 2: Monsters & Treasure; Volume 3: Underworld & Wilderness Adventures
| Greyhawk | Gary Gygax, Robert J. Kuntz | 1975 | 68 |
The first supplement for the original D&D game, Greyhawk focused primarily on rules and removed the game's dependence on the Chainmail rules. Despite the name, the Greyhawk supplement was not intended as a setting supplement, but rather featured rules used in Gary Gygax's Greyhawk campaign.
| Blackmoor | Dave Arneson | 1975 | 60 |
The second supplement for the original D&D game, Blackmoor added rules, monsters, treasure and is notable for containing the first published adventure for a role-playing game - "Temple of the Frog". Like Greyhawk, its focus was on rules than setting material, despite the name.
| Eldritch Wizardry | Gary Gygax, Brian Blume | 1976 | 60 |
Eldritch Wizardry was the third supplement for the original D&D game and is most notable for introducing some of its most famous monsters, such as demons and mind flayers.
| Gods, Demi-Gods & Heroes | Robert Kuntz, James M. Ward | 1976 | 72 |
Gods, Demi-Gods & Heroes was the fourth supplement for the original D&D game and adapted a variety of real-world and fictional pantheons for use in the D&D game.
| Swords & Spells | Gary Gygax | 1976 | 45 |
The fifth and final supplement for the original D&D game focused on providing a new diceless set of rules for large battles between armies. Gods, Demi-Gods & Heroes stated itself to be the "last supplement" for D&D in its introduction, and Swords & Spells did not have the official "Supplement V" designation on the cover.

== Basic Dungeons & Dragons ==
The Dungeons & Dragons Basic Set was the successor to original Dungeons & Dragons and was released while TSR, Inc. was working on the Advanced Dungeons & Dragons set. This set was the beginning of the split into two separate games, driven by disagreements on the direction the game should take. The Basic set retained the simplicity and flexibility of the original game while Gary Gygax took Advanced Dungeons & Dragons in a more structured and complicated direction.

Initially it was expected that players would start using Basic edition and then graduate to Advanced Dungeons & Dragons. However, in 1981 the Basic Set underwent a complete revision and not long after this the Expert Set was released for the first time. All references to a progression from the Basic Set to Advanced Dungeons & Dragons were removed from the games and supplements as TSR, Inc. made clear that the expected progression was from the Basic Set to the Expert Set. From this point the D&D dichotomy became fixed and the Basic/Expert pair were considered a completely separate game from Advanced Dungeons & Dragons.

=== Core products ===
| Title | Author | Date | Subject | Item # | ISBN |
|---|---|---|---|---|---|
| Basic Set | John Eric Holmes | 1977 | Details essential concepts of the D&D game. It gives rules for character creation and advancement for player characters at beginning levels. | TSR 1001 | |
| Basic Rules | Tom Moldvay | 1981 | A larger, sixty-four page revision of Basic Set, again for characters at beginning levels. Also included the adventure module The Keep on the Borderlands. | TSR 1011 | |
| Expert Rules | David Cook | 1981 | Contains rules for advancing characters from levels 4 through 14. Also included the adventure module The Isle of Dread. | TSR 1012 | |
| Set 1: Basic Rules | Frank Mentzer | 1983 | The third version of rules for beginning-level characters following Basic Set and Basic Rules. Includes a sixty-four page Players Manual and a forty-eight page Dungeon Masters Rulebook. | TSR 1011 | |
| Set 2: Expert Rules | Frank Mentzer | 1983 | The second version of Expert Rules. Includes a sixty-four page rulebook and a thirty-two page adventure module The Isle of Dread. | TSR 1012 | |
| Set 3: Companion Rules | Frank Mentzer | 1984 | Presents information for characters from levels 15 thought 25. Adds the druid class. Contains the books Player's Companion and Dungeon Master's Companion. | TSR 1013 | |
| Set 4: Master Rules | Frank Mentzer | 1985 | Presents information for characters from levels 26 thought 36. It introduces the mystic class (similar to the modern monk class), adds spells, adds to the available range of attack ranks that are meant for demihuman characters, and provides rules for weapons mastery. Included a 32-page Master Player's Book and a 64-page Master DM's Book. | TSR 1021 | |
| Set 5: Immortals Rules | Frank Mentzer | 1986 | Presents information for characters who have transcended levels, allowing them to exchange experience points for power points, similar to epic levels in later editions. Included a 52-page Player's Guide to Immortals and a 32-page DM's Guide to Immortals. | TSR 1017 | |
| The New Easy to Master Dungeons & Dragons Game | Troy Denning | April 1991 | A revised Basic Set, now expanded to cover levels 1 through 5, which presents the rules using a flash card system. Includes a beginning adventure with maps and accessories | TSR 1070 | |
| Rules Cyclopedia | Aaron Allston, Steven E. Schend, Jon Pickens, Dori Jean Watry | November 1991 | Compiles and updates basic, expert, companion, and master rules for characters up to level 36. 304 pages hardcover. ISBN 978-1-560-76085-6 | TSR 1071 | 1-56076-085-0 |
| The Classic Dungeons & Dragons Game | Doug Stewart | 1994 | A revision of the 1991 set that integrates the text from the flash card into sidebars in the single 128-page book | TSR 1106 | |

=== Monsters & NPCs ===
| Title | Author | Date | Pages | Item # | TSR # | ISBN |
|---|---|---|---|---|---|---|
| Monster & Treasure Assortment Set One: Levels 1-3 | ― | 1977 | ― | ― | TSR 9011 | |
| Monster & Treasure Assortment Set Two: Levels 4-6 | ― | 1977 | ― | ― | TSR 9012 | |
| Monster & Treasure Assortment Set Three: Levels 7- | ― | 1978 | ― | ― | TSR 9015 | |
| Monster & Treasure Assortment Set One to Three: Level 1-9 | ― | 1980 | ― | ― | TSR 9047 | 0-935696-36-9 |
| The Shady Dragon Inn | Carl Smith | 1983 | ― | AC1 | TSR 9100 | 0-88038-072-1 |
| Creature Catalogue | Various | 1986 | 96 | AC9 | TSR 9173 | |
| Bestiary of Dragons and Giants | Deborah Christian (editor) | 1987 | 64 | AC10 | TSR 9211 | |
| Creature Crucible: Tall Tales of the Wee Folk | John Nephew | 1989 | ― | PC1 | TSR 9254 | 0-88038-760-2 |
| Creature Crucible: Top Ballista | Carl Sargent | 1989 | ― | PC2 | TSR 9255 | 0-88038-774-2 |
| Creature Crucible: The Sea People | Jim Bambra | 1990 | ― | PC3 | TSR 9277 | |
| Creature Crucible: Night Howlers | Ann Dupuis | 1992 | ― | PC4 | TSR 9368 | 1-56076-392-2 |
| Character and Monster Assortment Pack | ― | 1992 | ― | ― | TSR 9363 | |
| Creature Catalog (revision) | Various | 1993 | ― | DMR2 | TSR 9438 | 1-56076-593-3 |

=== Settings ===
| Title | Author | Date | Subject | Pages | Item # | TSR # | ISBN |
|---|---|---|---|---|---|---|---|
| The Western Countries Trail Map | ― | 1989 | Details the travel routes found in the western countries of the world of Mystara. | ― | TM1 | TSR 9403 | |
| The Eastern Countries Trail Map | ― | 1989 | Details the travel routes found in the eastern countries of the world of Mystara. | ― | TM2 | TSR 9403 | |
| Krynn Trail Map | Ruth Mcroberts Ward | — | Details the travel routes found on the continent of Ansalon of the Dragonlance world. | ― | TM3 | TSR 9400 | 0-88038-723-8 |
| The City of Waterdeep Trail Map | ― | ― | Details the travel routes found near the city of Waterdeep in the Forgotten Realms campaign setting. | ― | TM4 | TSR 9401 | 0-88038-758-0 |
| Kara-Tur Trail Map | ― | ― | Details the travel routes found in the East Asian themed Kara-Tur area of the Forgotten Realms campaign setting. | ― | TM5 | TSR 9402 | 0-88038-763-7 |
| The Grand Duchy of Karameikos | Aaron Allston | 1987 | Describes the feudal nation of Karameikos in the world of Mystara. | 64 | GAZ1 | TSR 9193 | 0-88038-391-7 |
| The Emirates of Ylaruam | Ken Rolston | 1987 | Describes the desert nation of Ylaruam in the world of Mystara. | 64 | GAZ2 | TSR 9194 | 0-88038-392-5 |
| The Principalities of Glantri | Bruce Heard | 1987 | Describes Glantri, a land of magicians in the world of Mystara. | 96 | GAZ3 | TSR 9208 | 0-88038-485-9 |
| The Kingdom of Ierendi | Anne Gray McCready | 1987 | Describes Ierendi in the world of Mystara, an island archipelago populated by pirates but which tries to appear to outsiders as a tropical paradise. | 64 | GAZ4 | TSR 9215 | 0-88038-492-1 |
| The Elves of Alfheim | Steve Perrin, Anders Swenson | 1988 | Describes the elf nation of Alfheim in the world of Mystara. | ― | GAZ5 | TSR 9223 | 0-88038-538-3 |
| The Dwarves of Rockhome | Aaron Allston | 1988 | Describes the dwarven land of Rockhome in the world of Mystara. | 96 | GAZ6 | TSR 9227 | 0-88038-561-8 |
| The Northern Reaches | Ken Rolston, Elizabeth Danforth | 1988 | Describes the Viking-style lands of Ostland, Vestland, and Soderfjord in the world of Mystara. | ― | GAZ7 | TSR 9230 | |
| The Five Shires | Ed Greenwood | 1988 | Describes the land of the halflings (known as the Hin) in the world of Mystara. | ― | GAZ8 | TSR 9232 | |
| The Minrothad Guilds | Deborah Christian, Kim Eastland | 1988 | Describes the trading guilds and their islands in the world of Mystara. | ― | GAZ9 | TSR 9236 | 0-88038-607-X |
| The Orcs of Thar | Bruce Heard | ― | Describes the Broken Lands in the world of Mystara inhabited by orcs, goblins, and bugbears. | ― | GAZ10 | TSR 9241 | 0-88038-623-1 |
| The Republic of Darokin | Scott Haring, William W. Connors | ― | Describes the plutocratic republic of Darokin in the world of Mystara. | ― | GAZ11 | TSR 9250 | 0-88038-713-0 |
| The Golden Khan of Ethengar | Jim Bambra | 1989 | Describes the Ethengar tribes in the world of Mystara, who are described as resembling "the Mongols at the time of Kublai Khan". | ― | GAZ12 | TSR 9246 | 0-88038-724-6 |
| The Shadow Elves | Carl Sargent, Gary Thomas | 1990 | Describes the underground region where the shadow elves live in the world of Mystara. | ― | GAZ13 | TSR 9287 | 0-88038-846-3 |
| The Atruaghin Clans | William W. Connors | 1991 | Describes the Atruaghin Clans in the world of Mystara, which are a society loosely based on American Indian tribes. | 96 | GAZ14 | TSR 9306 | 0-88038-891-9 |
| Dawn of the Emperors: Thyatis and Alphatia | Aaron Allston | 1989 | Describes the warring empires of Thyatis and Alphatia in the world of Mystara. | Boxed set (3 books, 2 maps) | ― | TSR 1037 | 0-88038-736-X |
| Hollow World Campaign Set | Aaron Allston | 1990 | Describes the enormous hollow inside of the planet of Mystara, and the people and creatures that inhabit the lands found there. | Boxed set | ― | TSR 1054 | |
| Wrath of the Immortals | Aaron Allston | 1992 | Revises Set 5: Immortals Rules to be compatible with the Rules Cyclopedia. Included a 128-page core rulebook titled Codex of the Immortals and a 96-page campaign setting titled The Immortals' Fury. | ― | ― | TSR 1082 | 1-56076-412-0 |
| Hollow World: Sons of Azca | John Nephew | 1991 | Describes a civilization in the Hollow World under Mystara modeled after the Aztec civilization. | ― | HWR1 | TSR 9332 | |
| Hollow World: Kingdom of Nithia | Blake Mobley with Newton Ewell | 1991 | ― | ― | HWR2 | TSR 9339 | |
| Hollow World: The Milenian Empire | Anthony Herring | 1992 | ― | ― | HWR3 | TSR 9384 | |
| Thunder Rift | Colin McComb | 1992 | ― | ― | ― | TSR 9357 | 1-56076-381-7 |
| Champions of Mystara: Heroes of the Princess Ark | Ann Dupuis, Bruce A. Heard | 1993 | Describes the people living in skyships in the world of Mystara. | Boxed set | ― | TSR 1094 | 1-56076-615-8 |
| Poor Wizard's Almanac & Book of Facts | Aaron Allston | 1992 | Updates the timeline of major events in the world of Mystara. | 240 | AC1010 | TSR 9372 | 1-56076-385-X |
| Poor Wizard's Almanac II & Book of Facts | Ann Dupuis | 1993 | Updates the timeline of major events in the world of Mystara. | 240 | AC1011 | TSR 9441 | 1-56076-684-0 |
| Poor Wizard's Almanac III & Book of Facts | Ann Dupuis | 1994 | Updates the timeline of major events in the world of Mystara. | 240 | AC1012 | TSR 2506 | 1-56076-918-1 |
| Joshuan's Almanac & Book of Facts | Ann Dupuis, Elizabeth Thornabene | 1995 | Gives an overview of the world of Mystara for players. | 240 | ― | TSR 2517 | 0-7869-0192-6 |

=== Spells & items ===
| Title | Author | Date | Pages | Item # | TSR # | ISBN |
|---|---|---|---|---|---|---|
| The Book of Marvelous Magic | Gary Gygax, Frank Mentzer | 1985 | 76 | AC4 | TSR 9116 | 0-394-54533-8 |
| The Book of Wondrous Inventions | Bruce A. Heard (compiled) | 1987 | 96 | AC11 | TSR 9220 | 0-88038-497-2 |

== Advanced Dungeons & Dragons ==
Advanced Dungeons & Dragons (AD&D) greatly expanded upon the rules and settings of the original D&D game when it was released in 1977. As such, this edition saw the publication of numerous books to assist players. The naming of the core books in this edition became the standard for all later editions.

Around 1983, all previous hardcover releases (except Fiend Folio) including Monster Manual, Players Handbook, Dungeon Masters Guide and Deities & Demigods were upgraded with new cover art and unified with orange spines as trade dress. This included only minimal text change such as removal of rape references in Dungeon Masters Guide (books are now labeled "ages 10 and up"). Monster Manual II and the rest of the series followed the same format. By the end of its first decade, Advanced Dungeons & Dragons line had expanded to a library of 14 hardcover rulebooks, including three books of monsters, and two books governing character skills in wilderness and underground settings.

=== Core rules ===
| Title | Author | Date | Pages | ISBN |
|---|---|---|---|---|
| Player's Handbook | Gary Gygax, Mike Carr (editor) | June 1978 | 128 | 0-935696-01-6 |
| Dungeon Master's Guide | Gary Gygax | May 1979 | 232 (1st-5th printings), 238 (subsequent printings) | 0-935696-02-4 |

=== Character options ===
| Title | Author | Date | Subject | Pages | ISBN |
|---|---|---|---|---|---|
| Unearthed Arcana | Gary Gygax, Jeff Grubb (ed), Kim Mohan (ed) | December 1985 | Includes new races, classes, and other material to expand the rules in the Dungeon Masters Guide and Players Handbook | 128 | 0-88038-084-5 |

=== Monsters & NPCs ===
| Title | Author | Date | Subject | Pages | ISBN |
|---|---|---|---|---|---|
| Monster Manual | Gary Gygax | September 1977 | ― | 108 | 0-935696-00-8 |
| The Rogues Gallery | Brian Blume, Dave Cook, Jean Wells | 1980 | ― | 48 | 0-935696-18-0 |
| Deities & Demigods | James Ward, Robert Kuntz | December 1980 | Presents statistics and background information for gods, legendary heroes, and creatures taken from 12 pantheons and mythologies. In 1985 it was re-titled Legends & Lore and the Cthulhu and Melnibonean Mythos were removed. | 144 (1st & 2nd printing), 128 (3rd & 4th printings) | 0-935696-22-9 |
| Fiend Folio | Don Turnbull, Games Workshop | August 1981 | ― | 128 | 0-935696-21-0 |
| Monster Manual II | Gary Gygax | December 1983 | ― | 160 | 0-88038-031-4 |

=== Settings ===
| Title | Author | Date | Subject | Pages | ISBN |
|---|---|---|---|---|---|
Campaign worlds
| Oriental Adventures | Gary Gygax, David "Zeb" Cook, François Marcela-Froideval | October 1985 | ― | 144 | 0-88038-099-3 |
| Dragonlance Adventures | Tracy Hickman, Margaret Weis | October 1987 | ― | 128 | 0-88038-452-2 |
| Greyhawk Adventures | James M. Ward | September 1988 | ― | 128 | 0-88038-649-5 |
Environments and sites
| Dungeoneer's Survival Guide | Douglas Niles | June 1986 | Details how to run adventures in underground settings with specialized game rules for underground activities. Includes ecology and cultures of underground creatures and people. | 128 | 0-88038-272-4 |
| Wilderness Survival Guide | Kim Mohan | October 1986 | ― | 128 | 0-88038-291-0 |
| Manual of the Planes | Jeff Grubb | June 1987 | ― | 128 | 0-88038-399-2 |

== Advanced Dungeons & Dragons 2nd Edition ==
In 1989, Advanced Dungeons & Dragons 2nd Edition was published. Initially, the second edition would consolidate the game, with two core hardcovers, the Player's Handbook and Dungeon Master's Guide, while monsters would be published as the Monstrous Compendium, a 3-ring binder with monsters printed on loose-leaf sheets that Dungeon Masters could sort the contents of as they wish, with additional Monstrous Compendium volumes released as additional packets of loose-leaf sheets that could be added to the binder. However, the binder format proved to be unpopular and by popular demand TSR released a hardcover Monstrous Manual in 1993. Additionally, TSR published three lines of optional supplemental rulebooks: the PHBR series for player options, the DMGR series for Dungeon Masters, and the HR series containing reference material for adapting real-world historical periods to the game.

By 1995, with power creep from optional classes and races becoming prominent, they were forced to abandon their original plan and revise the entire line. New versions of the core rule books were published featuring reorganized page layouts, new art and a black-bordered trade dress accompanied by a new logo, though they had few rule changes. A new series of books featuring player options and dungeon master options were also published in hardcover books featuring the same trade dress.

=== Core rules ===
| Title | Author | Date | Pages | TSR # | ISBN |
|---|---|---|---|---|---|
| Player's Handbook | David "Zeb" Cook | April 1989 | 256 | TSR 2101 | 0-88038-716-5 |
| Dungeon Master's Guide | David "Zeb" Cook | June 1989 | 192 | TSR 2100 | 0-88038-729-7 |
| Dungeon Master's Guide (Revised; 1995) | David "Zeb" Cook, Steve Winter | April 1995 | 256 | TSR 2160 | 0-7869-0328-7 |
| Player's Handbook (Revised; 1995) | David "Zeb" Cook, Steve Winter | April 1995 | 320 | TSR 2159 | 0-7869-0329-5 |

=== Character options ===
| Title | Author | Date | Pages | Item # | TSR # | ISBN |
|---|---|---|---|---|---|---|
| The Complete Fighter's Handbook | Aaron Allston | December 1989 | 128 | PHBR1 | TSR 2110 | 0-88038-779-3 |
| The Complete Thief's Handbook | John Nephew, Carl Sargent, Douglas Niles | December 1989 | 128 | PHBR2 | TSR 2111 | 0-88038-780-7 |
| The Complete Priest's Handbook | Aaron Allston | May 1990 | 128 | PHBR3 | TSR 2113 | 0-88038-818-8 |
| The Complete Wizard's Handbook | Rick Swan | June 1990 | 128 | PHBR4 | TSR 2115 | 0-88038-838-2 |
| The Complete Psionics Handbook | Steve Winter | January 1991 | 128 | PHBR5 | TSR 2117 | 1-560-76054-0 |
| The Complete Book of Dwarves | Jim Bambra | October 1991 | 128 | PHBR6 | TSR 2124 | 1-560-76110-5 |
| The Complete Bard's Handbook | Blake Mobley | March 1992 | 128 | PHBR7 | TSR 2127 | 1-560-76360-4 |
| The Complete Book of Elves | Colin McComb | December 1992 | 128 | PHBR8 | TSR 2131 | 1-560-76376-0 |
| The Complete Book of Gnomes & Halflings | Douglas Niles | February 1993 | 128 | PHBR9 | TSR 2134 | 1-560-76573-9 |
| The Complete Book of Humanoids | Bill Slavicsek | April 1993 | 128 | PHBR10 | TSR 2135 | 1-560-76611-5 |
| The Complete Ranger's Handbook | Rick Swan | December 1993 | 128 | PHBR11 | TSR 2136 | 1-560-76634-4 |
| The Complete Paladin's Handbook | Rick Swan | May 1994 | 128 | PHBR12 | TSR 2147 | 1-560-76845-2 |
| The Complete Sha'ir's Handbook | Sam Witt | August 1994 | 126 | ― | TSR 2146 | 1-560-76828-2 |
| The Complete Druid's Handbook | David Pulver | August 1994 | 128 | PHBR13 | TSR 2150 | 1-560-76886-X |
| The Complete Barbarian's Handbook | Rick Swan | January 1995 | 128 | PHBR14 | TSR 2148 | 0-7869-0090-3 |
| The Complete Ninja's Handbook | Aaron Allston | August 1995 | 128 | PHBR15 | TSR 2155 | 0-7869-0159-4 |
| Tome of Magic (Revised; 1999) | David Cook, Nigel Findley, Anthony Herring, Christopher Kubasik, Carl Sargent, Rick Swan | May 1991 | 160 | ― | TSR 2121 | 1-560-76107-5 |
| Player's Option: Combat & Tactics | Skip Williams, L. Richard Baker III | June 1995 | 192 | ― | TSR 2149 | 0-7869-0096-2 |
| Player's Option: Skills & Powers | Douglas Niles and Dale Donovan | July 1995 | 192 | ― | TSR 2154 | 0-7869-0149-7 |
| Player's Option: Spells & Magic | Richard Baker | May 1996 | 192 | ― | TSR 2163 | 0-7869-0394-5 |

=== Monsters and NPCs ===
| Title | Author | Date | Pages | Item # | TSR # | ISBN |
|---|---|---|---|---|---|---|
| Monstrous Compendium Volume One | David Cook | 1989 | 144 (loose leaf), 12 dividers and 3-ring D-binder | MC1 | TSR 2102 | 0-88038-738-6 |
| Monstrous Compendium Volume Two | Jay Battista, Scott Bennie, Grant Boucher, Jim Holloway, Daniel Horne | 1989 | 144 (loose leaf) | MC2 | TSR 2103 | 0-88038-753-X |
| Monstrous Compendium Volume Three Forgotten Realms Appendix | William Connors, David Martin, Rick Swan, Thomas Baxa, Mark A. Nelson | 1989 | 64 (loose leaf), 4 dividers | MC3 | TSR 2104 | 0-88038-769-6 |
| Monstrous Compendium Dragonlance Appendix | Rick Swan | 1989 | 96 (loose leaf), 4 dividers and 3-ring D-binder | MC4 | TSR 2105 | 0-88038-822-6 |
| Monstrous Compendium Greyhawk Adventures Appendix | Tactical Strategy Rules | 1990 | 64 (loose leaf), 4 dividers | MC5 | TSR 2107 | 0-88038-836-6 |
| Monstrous Compendium Kara-Tur Appendix | Tactical Strategy Rules | 1990 | 64 (loose leaf), 4 dividers | MC6 | TSR 2116 | 0-88038-851-X |
| Monstrous Compendium Spelljammer Appendix | Tactical Strategy Rules | 1990 | 64 (loose leaf), 4 dividers | MC7 | TSR 2109 | 0-88038-871-4 |
| Legends & Lore | James M. Ward, Troy Denning | July 1990 | 192 | ― | TSR 2108 | 0-88038-844-7 |
| Monstrous Compendium Outer Planes Appendix | James Lafountain | 1991 | 96 (loose leaf), 4 dividers | MC8 | TSR 2118 | 1-56076-055-9 |
| Monstrous Compendium Spelljammer Appendix II | ― | 1991 | 64 (loose leaf), 4 dividers | MC9 | TSR 2119 | |
| Monstrous Compendium Ravenloft Appendix | William Connors | 1991 | 64 (loose leaf), 4 dividers | MC10 | TSR 2122 | 1-56076-108-3 |
| Monstrous Compendium Forgotten Realms Appendix II | ― | 1991 | 64 (loose leaf), 4 dividers | MC11 | TSR 2125 | |
| Monstrous Compendium Dark Sun Appendix: Terrors of the Desert | Tactical Strategy Rules | 1992 | 96 (loose leaf) | MC12 | TSR 2405 | 1-56076-272-1 |
| Monstrous Compendium Al-Qadim Appendix | Wolfgang Baur and Steve Kurtz | 1992 | 64 (loose leaf), 4 dividers | MC13 | TSR 2129 | 1-56076-370-1 |
| Monstrous Compendium Fiend Folio Appendix | RPGA Network | 1992 | 64 (loose leaf), 4 dividers | MC14 | TSR 2132 | 1-56076-428-7 |
| Monstrous Compendium Ravenloft Appendix II: Children of the Night | Tactical Strategy Rules | 1993 | 64 (loose leaf), 4 dividers | MC15 | TSR 2139 | 1-56076-586-0 |
| Monstrous Manual (reprinting MC1 & MC2 plus others) | Tim Beach | June 1993 | 384 | ― | TSR 2140 | 1-56076-619-0 |
| Mystara Monstrous Compendium Appendix | Allen Varney, John Nephew, Teeuwynn Woodruff, John Terra, and Skip Williams | 1994 | 128 (softcover) | ― | TSR 2501 | 1-56076-875-4 |
| Planescape Monstrous Compendium Appendix | Allen Varney and Sarah Feggestad | 1994 | 128 (softcover) | ― | TSR 2602 | 1-56076-862-2 |
| Ravenloft Monstrous Compendium Appendix III: Creatures of Darkness | ― | 1994 | 128 (softcover) | ― | TSR 2153 | 1-56076-914-9 |
| Monstrous Compendium Annual Volume One (reprints from modules and magazines of 1993) | David Wise, Jeff Easley, and Tony DiTerlizzi | 1994 | 128 (softcover) | ― | TSR 2145 | 1-56076-838-X |
| Dark Sun Monstrous Compendium Appendix II: Terrors Beyond Tyr | Anne Gray McCready | 1995 | 128 (softcover) | ― | TSR 2433 | 0-78690-097-0 |
| Planescape Monstrous Compendium Appendix II | Karen S. Boomgarden | 1995 | 128 (softcover) | ― | TSR 2613 | 0-7869-0173-X |
| Monstrous Compendium Annual Volume Two (reprints from modules and magazines of 1994) | ― | 1995 | 128 (softcover) | ― | TSR 2158 | 0-7869-0199-3 |
| Ravenloft Monstrous Compendium Appendices I & II (reprinting MC10 & MC15) | William W. Connors | 1996 | 128 (softcover) | ― | ― | 0-78690-392-9 |
| Savage Coast Monstrous Compendium Appendix | ― | 1996 | 126 (download-only) | ― | TSR 2524 | |
| Monstrous Compendium Annual Volume Three (reprints from modules and magazines of 1995) | ― | 1996 | 128 (softcover) | ― | TSR 2166 | |
| Planescape Monstrous Compendium Appendix III | ― | 1998 | 128 (softcover) | ― | TSR 2635 | 0-78690-751-7 |
| Monstrous Compendium Annual Volume Four (reprints from modules and magazines of 1996–7) | Tactical Strategy Rules | 1998 | 96 (softcover) | ― | TSR 2173 | 0-7869-0783-5 |
| Monster Mythology | Carl Sargent | April 1992 | 128 | DMGR4 | TSR 2128 | 1-560-76362-0 |
| The Complete Book of Villains | Kirk Botula | April 1994 | 128 | DMGR6 | TSR 2144 | 1-560-76837-1 |
| The Complete Book of Necromancers | Steve Kurtz | March 1995 | 128 | DMGR7 | TSR 2151 | 0-7869-0106-3 |
| Sages & Specialists | Matt Forbeck | July 1996 | 128 | DMGR8 | TSR 2164 | 0-7869-0410-0 |

=== Optional rules ===
| Title | Author | Date | Pages | Item # | TSR # | ISBN |
|---|---|---|---|---|---|---|
| Creative Campaigning | Anthony Pryor, Tony Herring, Jonathan Tweet, and Norm Ritchie | January 1993 | 128 | DMGR5 | TSR 2133 | 1-560-76561-5 |
| Of Ships and the Sea | Keith Francis Strohm | September 1997 | 128 | DMGR9 | TSR 2170 | 0-7869-0706-1 |
| Dungeon Master Option: High-Level Campaigns | Skip Williams | August 1995 | 192 | ― | TSR 2156 | 0-7869-0168-3 |
| Campaign Option: Council of Wyrms | Bill Slavicsek | September 1999 | 202 | ― | TSR 11383 | 0-7869-1383-5 |

=== Settings ===
| Title | Author | Date | Pages | Item # | TSR # | ISBN |
|---|---|---|---|---|---|---|
Campaign worlds
| Dark Sun Boxed Set | Timothy Brown, Troy Denning | October 1991 | 210 | ― | TSR 2400 | 1-56076-104-0 |
| Dark Sun: Dragon Kings | Timothy Brown | May 1992 | 210 | ― | TSR 2408 | 1-560-76235-7 |
| Al-Qadim: Land of Fate | Jeff Grubb, Andria Hayday | August 1992 | 210 | ― | TSR 1077 | 1-560-76329-9 |
| Ravenloft: Domains of Dread | William W. Connors, Steve Miller | August 1997 | 288 | ― | TSR 2174 | 0-7869-0672-3 |
Historical Reference series
| Vikings Campaign Sourcebook | David "Zeb" Cook | April 1991 | 96 | HR1 | TSR 9322 | 1-560-76128-8 |
| Charlemagne's Paladins Campaign Sourcebook | Ken Rolston | June 1992 | 96 | HR2 | TSR 9323 | 1-560-76393-0 |
| Celts Campaign Sourcebook | Graeme Davis | October 1992 | 96 | HR3 | TSR 9376 | 1-560-76374-4 |
| A Mighty Fortress Campaign Sourcebook | Steve Winter | November 1992 | 96 | HR4 | TSR 9370 | 1-560-76372-8 |
| The Glory of Rome Campaign Sourcebook | David L. Pulver | October 1993 | 96 | HR5 | TSR 9425 | 1-560-76673-5 |
| Age of Heroes Campaign Sourcebook | Nicky Rea | March 1994 | 96 | HR6 | TSR 9408 | 1-560-76814-2 |
| The Crusades Campaign Sourcebook | Steve Kurtz | October 1994 | 96 | HR7 | TSR 9469 | 1-560-76858-4 |
Sites series
| City Sites | Skip Williams | 1994 | 98 | ― | TSR 9464 | 1-560-76923-8 |
| Den of Thieves | Wes Nicholson | 1996 | 96 | ― | TSR 9515 | 0-7869-0382-1 |
| World Builder's Guidebook | Richard Baker | 1996 | 96 | ― | TSR 9532 | 0-7869-0434-8 |
| Dungeon Builder's Guidebook | Bruce R. Cordell | 1998 | 64 | ― | TSR 9556 | 0-7869-1207-3 |
| College of Wizardry | Bruce R. Cordell | 1998 | 94 | ― | TSR 9549 | 0-7869-0717-7 |
| Bastion of Faith | Bruce R. Cordell | 2000 | 96 | ― | TSR 11442 | 978-0-7869-1442-5 |
| Campaign Sourcebook and Catacomb Guide | Jennell Jaquays (Note: Credited as Paul Jaquays) and William W. Connors | March 1990 | 128 | DMGR1 | TSR 2112 | 0-87975-653-5 |
| The Castle Guide | Grant Boucher, Troy Christensen, Arthur Collins, Nigel Findley, Timothy B. Brown and William W. Connors | April 1990 | 128 | DMGR2 | TSR 2114 | 0-88038-837-4 |
Odyssey series
| Savage Coast Monstrous Compendium | 1996 | | | | | |
| Savage Coast Campaign Book | Tim Beach and Bruce Heard | 1996 | | | | |
| Orc's Head | 1996 | | | | | |
| Tale of the Comet | 1997 | | | | | |
| Jakandor, Island of War | Jeff Grubb | 1997 | | | | |
| Jakandor, Isle of Destiny | Kirk Botula | 1998 | | | | |
| Jakandor, Land of Legend | Dale Donovan | 1998 | | | | |

=== Spells & items ===
| Title | Author | Date | Pages | TSR # | ISBN |
|---|---|---|---|---|---|
| Arms and Equipment Guide | Grant Boucher, Troy Christensen, Jon Pickens, John Terra, and Scott Davis | July 1991 | 128 | TSR 2123 (DMGR3) | 1-560-76109-1 |
| The Magic Encyclopedia, Volume One | Connie Rae Henson, Dale "Slade" Henson | 1992 | 210 | TSR 9293 | 1-560-76429-5 |
| The Magic Encyclopedia, Volume Two | Dale Henson | 1993 | 210 | TSR 9421 | 1-560-76563-1 |
| Deck of Magical Items | Clyde Caldwell | April 1993 | 210 | TSR 9423 | 1-560-76587-9 |
| Book of Artifacts | David "Zeb" Cook | September 1993 | 160 | TSR 2138 | 1-560-76672-7 |
| Encyclopedia Magica, Volume 1 | Dale "Slade" Henson | 1994 | 416 | TSR 2141 | 1-560-76842-8 |
| Encyclopedia Magica, Volume 2 | Dale "Slade" Henson | 1995 | 416 | TSR 2152 | 0-7869-0124-1 |
| Encyclopedia Magica, Volume 3 | Dale "Slade" Henson | 1995 | 416 | TSR 2157 | 0-7869-0187-X |
| Encyclopedia Magica, Volume 4 | Doug Stewart | 1995 | 416 | TSR 2161 | 0-7869-0289-2 |
| Wizard's Spell Compendium, Volume 1 | Jon Pickens | 1996 | 288 | TSR 2165 | 0-7869-0436-4 |
| Wizard's Spell Compendium, Volume 2 | TSR | 1997 | 288 | TSR 2168 | 0-7869-0664-2 |
| Wizard's Spell Compendium, Volume 3 | Jon Pickens | 1998 | 288 | TSR 2175 | 0-7869-0791-6 |
| Wizard's Spell Compendium, Volume 4 | Jon Pickens and Mark Middleton | 1998 | 288 | TSR 2177 | 0-7869-1209-X |
| Priest's Spell Compendium, Volume 1 | Jon Pickens, Mark S. Middleton | 1999 | 288 | TSR 11359 | 0-7869-1359-2 |
| Priest's Spell Compendium, Volume 2 | TSR | 1999 | 288 | TSR 11421 | 0-7869-1421-1 |
| Priest's Spell Compendium, Volume 3 | Jon Pickens | 2000 | 256 | TSR 11611 | 0-7869-1611-7 |

=== Starter sets ===
| Title | Author | Date | TSR # | ISBN |
|---|---|---|---|---|
| First Quest: The Introduction to Role-Playing Games | Bruce Nesmith, L. Richard Baker III, David "Zeb" Cook | 1994 | TSR 1105 | 1-560-76844-4 |
| Introduction to Advanced Dungeons & Dragons Game | ― | December 1995 | TSR 1134 | 0-7869-0332-5 |
| The Complete Starter Set: Advanced Dungeons & Dragons Game | ― | December 1996 | TSR 1167 | 0-7869-0640-5 |
| Dungeons & Dragons Adventure Game (1999) | Bill Slavicsek | April 1999 | TSR 11450 | 0-7869-1450-5 |

== Dungeons & Dragons 3rd edition and v3.5 ==
A major revision of the AD&D rules was released in 2000. As the Basic game had been discontinued some years earlier, and the more straightforward title was more marketable, the word "Advanced" was dropped and the new edition was called just Dungeons & Dragons, but was still officially referred to as 3rd edition (or 3E for short).

This edition was the first to be released by Wizards of the Coast after their acquisition of the company, as well as the first to allow third-party companies to make supplemental materials by use of the Open Game License. A series of Map Folios were also produced.

In July 2003, a revised version of the 3rd edition D&D rules (termed version 3.5) was released that incorporated numerous rule changes, as well as expanding the Dungeon Master's Guide and Monster Manual.

=== Core rules ===
| Title | Author | Date | Subject | Pages | ISBN |
|---|---|---|---|---|---|
| Player's Handbook: Core Rulebook I | Monte Cook, Jonathan Tweet, Skip Williams | July 2, 2000 | An essential rulebook for any players and Dungeon Masters alike of the D&D game. | 304 | 0-7869-1550-1 |
| Dungeon Master's Guide: Core Rulebook II | Monte Cook, Jonathan Tweet, Skip Williams | September 1, 2000 | An essential rulebook for Dungeon Masters of the D&D game. | 224 | 0-7869-1551-X |
| Monster Manual: Core Rulebook III | Monte Cook, Jonathan Tweet, Skip Williams | October 1, 2000 | From aboleths to zombies, the Monster Manual holds a diverse cast of enemies and allies essential for any Dungeons & Dragons campaign. | 224 | 0-7869-1552-8 |
| Player's Handbook: Core Rulebook I v.3.5 | Monte Cook, Jonathan Tweet, Skip Williams, Andy Collins | July 1, 2003 | 2003 revision of the game updated the core book to this new version. Credited revision work by Andy Collins. | 317 | 0-7869-2886-7 |
| Dungeon Master's Guide: Core Rulebook II v.3.5 | Monte Cook, David Noonan | July 1, 2003 | 2003 revision of the game updated the core book to this new version. Note increased page count. Credited revision work by David Noonan and Rich Baker. | 320 | 0-7869-2889-1 |
| Monster Manual: Core Rulebook III v.3.5 | Monte Cook, Jonathan Tweet, Skip Williams | July 1, 2003 | 2003 revision of the game updated the core book to this new version. Note increased page count. Also note Monster Manual II did not receive this treatment. Credited revision work by Rich Baker and Skip Williams. | 319 | 0-7869-2893-X |

=== Character options ===
| Title | Author | Date | Subject | Pages | ISBN |
|---|---|---|---|---|---|
| Hero Builder's Guidebook | Ryan Dancey, David Noonan, John Rateliff | December 1, 2000 | Provides assistance to help develop player characters. | 64 | 0-7869-1647-8 |
| Sword and Fist | Jason Carl | January 1, 2001 | A guidebook to fighters and monks | 96 | 0-7869-1829-2 |
| Psionics Handbook | Bruce R. Cordell | March 1, 2001 | Rules and options for integrating psionic powers into the D&D game. | 160 | 0-7869-1835-7 |
| Defenders of the Faith | Rich Redman, James Wyatt | May 1, 2001 | A guidebook to clerics and paladins | 96 | 0-7869-1840-3 |
| Tome and Blood | Bruce R. Cordell, Skip Williams | July 1, 2001 | A guidebook to wizards and sorcerers | 96 | 0-7869-1845-4 |
| Song and Silence | David Noonan, John D. Rateliff | December 1, 2001 | A guidebook to rogues and bards | 96 | 0-7869-1857-8 |
| Masters of the Wild | Mike Selinker, David Eckelberry | February 1, 2002 | A guidebook to barbarians, druids, and rangers | 96 | 0-7869-2653-8 |
| Savage Species | David Eckelberry, Jennifer Clarke Wilkes, Rich Redman, Sean K Reynolds | February 1, 2003 | A guidebook to monsters as playable characters. | 224 | 0-7869-2648-1 |
| Complete Warrior | Andy Collins, David Noonan, Ed Stark | December 1, 2003 | Replaces and expands upon Sword and Fist | 160 | 0-7869-2880-8 |
| Expanded Psionics Handbook | Bruce R. Cordell | April 1, 2004 | Replaces and expands upon Psionics Handbook, with four psionic classes, new psionic races, and other related rules. | 224 | 0-7869-3301-1 |
| Complete Divine | David Noonan | May 1, 2004 | Replaces and expands upon Masters of the Wild and Defenders of the Faith | 192 | 0-7869-3272-4 |
| Planar Handbook | Bruce R. Cordell and Gwendolyn F.M. Kestrel | July 1, 2004 | Rules for characters adventuring in the Planes | 192 | 0-7869-3429-8 |
| Races of Stone | Jesse Decker, Michelle Lyons, David Noonan | August 1, 2004 | A guidebook to dwarves, gnomes, and goliaths | 192 | 0-7869-3278-3 |
| Complete Arcane | Richard Baker | November 18, 2004 | Replaces and expands upon Tome and Blood | 192 | 0-7869-3435-2 |
| Races of Destiny | David Noonan, Eric Cagle, and Aaron Rosenberg | December 1, 2004 | A guidebook to humans, half-elves, half-orcs, and Illumian | 192 | 0-7869-3653-3 |
| Complete Adventurer | Jesse Decker | January 13, 2005 | Replaces and expands upon Song and Silence | 192 | 0-7869-3651-7 |
| Races of the Wild | Skip Williams | February 1, 2005 | A guidebook to elves, halflings, and raptorans | 192 | 0-7869-3438-7 |
| Magic of Incarnum | James Wyatt, Frank Brunner, Stephen Schubert | September 22, 2005 | Introduces three new classes that use a new magic source called incarnum. | 224 | 0-7869-3701-7 |
| Races of the Dragon | Gwendolyn F.M. Kestrel, Jennifer Clarke Wilkes, Kolja Raven Liquette | January 17, 2006 | A guidebook to kobolds, half-dragons, dragonborn, and spellscales | 160 | 0-7869-3913-3 |
| Tome of Magic | Matthew Sernett, Ari Marmell, David Noonan, Robert J. Schwalb | March 14, 2006 | Expanded options for members of the mage and cleric classes and their subclasses | 288 | 0-7869-3909-5 |
| Complete Psionic | Bruce R. Cordell, Christopher Lindsay | April 11, 2006 | New psionic classes and races | 160 | 0-7869-3911-7 |
| Player's Handbook II | David Noonan | May 9, 2006 | New classes and rules for players | 244 | 0-7869-3918-4 |
| Dragon Magic | Owen K.C. Stephens, Rodney Thompson | September 12, 2006 | Rules to let characters use dragon-source powers. | 160 | 0-7869-3936-2 |
| Complete Mage | Skip Williams, Penny Williams, Ari Marmell, Kolja Raven Liquette | October 10, 2006 | Feats, prestige classes, and other options for magic characters | 160 | 0-7869-3937-0 |
| Complete Scoundrel | Mike McArtor and F. Wesley Schneider | January 16, 2007 | Feats, prestige classes, and other options for trickster characters | 160 | 978-0-7869-4152-0 |
| Complete Champion | Ed Stark, Chris Thomasson, Rhiannon Louve, Ari Marmell, Gary Astleford | June 5, 2007 | Sequel to Complete Divine, focusing on characters who fight for a cause | 160 | 978-0-7869-4034-9 |
| Rules Compendium | Chris Sims | October 16, 2007 | Summarised rules from most previous race and class sourcebooks in 3rd edition. | 160 | 978-0-7869-4725-6 |

=== Monsters and NPCs ===
| Title | Author | Date | Subject | Pages | ISBN |
|---|---|---|---|---|---|
| Enemies and Allies | Jeff Grubb, David Noonan, Skip Williams, Bruce R. Cordell | October 1, 2001 | Statistics and descriptions for a large variety of pregenerated non-player characters. | 64 | 0-7869-1852-7 |
| Deities and Demigods | Rich Redman, Skip Williams, James Wyatt | February 1, 2002 | Descriptions and game statistics of gods and legendary creatures from various sources in mythology and fiction. | 224 | 0-7869-2654-6 |
| Monster Manual II | Ed Bonny, Jeff Grubb, Rich Redman, Skip Williams, Steve Winter | September 1, 2002 | A sequel to the core Monster Manual, includes statistics for an assortment of fantasy monsters. Also includes advice for designing new monsters. | 224 | 0-7869-2873-5 |
| Fiend Folio | Eric Cagle, Jesse Decker, James Jacobs, Erik Mona, Matt Sernett, Chris Thomasson, James Wyatt | April 1, 2003 | Includes statistics for monsters with an emphasis on ones with extraplanar origins. Also introduces the swarm subtype and monster prestige classes. | 224 | 0-7869-2780-1 |
| Draconomicon: The Book of Dragons | Andy Collins, Skip Williams, James Wyatt | November 1, 2003 | Contains information about dragon physiology and psychology, along with new dragon-only feats, spells, and prestige classes. There are also additional rules regarding aerial combat and breath weapons. | 288 | 0-7869-2884-0 |
| Monster Manual III | Gwendolyn F. M. Kestrel | August 1, 2004 | A sequel to the core Monster Manual, includes statistics for an assortment of fantasy monsters, with a focus on where the monsters can be found in the Forgotten Realms and Eberron campaign settings. | 224 | 0-7869-3430-1 |
| Libris Mortis: The Book of Undead | Andy Collins, Bruce R. Cordell | October 14, 2004 | Covers the ecology of undead within the D&D universe and gives statistics for 47 new monsters. Also includes undead-related feats, spells, equipment, and prestige classes. | 192 | 0-7869-3433-6 |
| Lords of Madness: The Book of Aberrations | Richard Baker, James Jacobs, Steve Winter | April 14, 2005 | Covers the ecology and anatomy of creatures classified as aberrations, including variants and prestige classes for those monsters. | 224 | 0-7869-3657-6 |
| Fiendish Codex I: Hordes of the Abyss | James Jacobs, Erik Mona | June 13, 2006 | Describes demons in the D&D universe, including their physiology and subtypes. Also describes 14 demon lords and 15 levels of the Abyss. | 160 | 0-7869-3919-2 |
| Monster Manual IV | Gwendolyn F. M. Kestrel | July 11, 2006 | A sequel to the core Monster Manual, includes statistics for an assortment of fantasy monsters. Each monster's description also includes probable behavior in combat and pre-prepared encounter complete with a map. | 222 | 0-7869-3920-6 |
| Fiendish Codex II: Tyrants of the Nine Hells | Robin D. Laws, Robert J. Schwalb | December 12, 2006 | Describes devils in the D&D universe, including their physiology, subtypes, and motivations. Also describes the nine layers of Hell. Includes four new prestige classes. | 160 | 0-7869-3940-0 |
| Drow of the Underdark | Robert J. Schwalb, Anthony Pryor, Greg A. Vaughan | May 8, 2007 | Provides rules focusing on drow culture, equipment, and folklore. | 224 | 978-0-7869-4151-3 |
| Monster Manual V | Creighton Broadhurst | July 17, 2007 | A sequel to the core Monster Manual, includes statistics for an assortment of fantasy monsters. Like the previous sequel, includes discussion of monsters' lairs and combat tactics. | 224 | 978-0-7869-4115-5 |
| Exemplars of Evil: Deadly Foes to Vex Your Heroes | Robert J. Schwalb, Eytan Bernstein, Creighton Broadhurst, Steve Kenson, Kolja Raven Liquette, Allen Rausch | September 18, 2007 | Shows how to build memorable villains. Presents eight ready-to-play villainous groups of various levels, each including game statistics, campaign hooks, statistics for minions, and a fully described lair. | 160 | 978-0-7869-4361-6 |
| Elder Evils | Robert J. Schwalb | December 18, 2007 | Describes alien, monstrous evils and is designed as a way of providing game masters a means of ending a current campaign. | 160 | 978-0-7869-4733-1 |

=== Optional rules ===
| Title | Author | Date | Subject | Pages | ISBN |
|---|---|---|---|---|---|
| Epic Level Handbook | Andy Collins, Bruce R. Cordell, Thomas M. Reid | July 1, 2002 | Optional game rules for playing characters who have reached a higher experience level than is covered in the standard rules. | 320 | 0-7869-2658-9 |
| Book of Vile Darkness | Monte Cook | October 1, 2002 | Introduced several new mechanics relating to evil in D&D, including rules for drug use, demonic possession, torture, and ritual sacrifice. The first Dungeons & Dragons book labelled for mature audiences. | 160 | 0-7869-2650-3 |
| Book of Exalted Deeds | James Wyatt, Darrin Drader, Christopher Perkins | October 1, 2003 | Offers new rules for good occurrences, acts, and characters in the game, and discussion of how to deal with moral issues and religion in games. As a counterpoint to the previously published Book of Vile Darkness, it was also labelled for mature audiences. | 192 | 0-7869-3136-1 |
| Miniatures Handbook | Jonathan Tweet, Mike Donais, Skaff Elias, Bruce R. Cordell | October 1, 2003 | Offers rules for combat using tabletop miniatures. | 192 | 0-7869-3281-3 |
| Unearthed Arcana | Andy Collins, Jesse Decker, David Noonan, Rich Redman | February 1, 2004 | Variant rules and options to change and customise the game's usual rules. | 224 | 0-7869-3131-0 |
| Heroes of Battle | David Noonan, Will McDermott, Stephen Schubert | May 19, 2005 | Rules for Dungeon Masters to incorporate large-scale, epic battles into their game. | 160 | 0-7869-3686-X |
| Dungeon Master's Guide II | Jesse Decker, David Noonan, Chris Thomasson, James Jacobs, Robin D. Laws | June 23, 2005 | Provides advice on aspects of running the game as well as complex pregenerated characters (often using Prestige Classes). | 288 | 0-7869-3687-8 |
| Heroes of Horror | James Wyatt, Ari Marmell, C. A. Suleiman | October 20, 2005 | Rules for Dungeon Masters to incorporate elements of horror into their game. | 160 | 0-7869-3699-1 |
| Tome of Battle: The Book of Nine Swords | Richard Baker, Frank Brunner, Joseph Carriker Jr. | August 8, 2006 | Blends elements of east Asian combat styles with D&D's usual western-inspired setting. Allows increased viability of melee combats at high levels. | 160 | 0-7869-3922-2 |

=== Settings ===
| Title | Author | Date | Subject | Pages | ISBN |
|---|---|---|---|---|---|
Campaign worlds
| Oriental Adventures | James Wyatt | October 1, 2001 | Legend of the Five Rings campaign setting. | 256 | 0-7869-2015-7 |
| Ghostwalk | Monte Cook and Sean K. Reynolds | June 1, 2003 | Campaign setting about the afterlife. | 224 | 0-7869-2834-4 |
Environments and sites
| Manual of the Planes | Jeff Grubb, Bruce R. Cordell, David Noonan | September 1, 2001 | Describes the planar cosmology of the D&D universe. | 224 | 0-7869-1850-0 |
| Stronghold Builder's Guidebook | Matt Forbeck, David Noonan | May 1, 2002 | Details a process by which DMs and players can design a stronghold and includes tips for building a campaign with a stronghold as the setting. | 128 | 0-7869-2655-4 |
| Book of Challenges: Dungeon Rooms, Puzzles, and Traps | Daniel Kaufman, Gwendolyn F. M. Kestrel, Mike Selinker, Skip Williams | June 1, 2002 | Presents a number of ready-made dungeon encounters that a Dungeon Master can insert into a scenario. | 128 | 0-7869-2657-0 |
| Frostburn | Wolfgang Baur, James Jacobs, George Strayton | September 23, 2004 | Provides rules for adventuring in a cold environments. | 224 | 0-7869-2896-4 |
| Sandstorm | Bruce R. Cordell, Jennifer Clarke Wilkes, J. D. Wiker | March 1, 2005 | Provides rules for adventuring in desert or wasteland environments. | 224 | 0-7869-3655-X |
| Stormwrack | Richard Baker, Joseph D. Carriker, Jr., Jennifer Clarke Wilkes | August 2005 | Provides rules for adventuring on ships or in underwater environments. | 224 | 0-7869-3689-4 |
| Cityscape | Ari Marmell, C.A. Suleiman | November 7, 2006 | Provides advice for DMs to run campaigns centred around cities and includes new optional abilities for player characters. | 160 | 0-7869-3939-7 |
| Dungeonscape | Jason Bulmahn, Rich Burlew | February 13, 2007 | Provides advice for DMs to run campaigns in dungeons and includes new optional abilities for player characters. | 160 | 978-0-7869-4118-6 |
| Dungeon Survival Guide | Bill Slavicsek, Christopher Perkins | October 23, 2007 | An accessory that explores the features of dungeons in Dungeons & Dragons, and revisits 20 famous dungeons from throughout the game's history. | 64 | 978-0-7869-4730-0 |

=== Spells & items ===
| Title | Author | Date | Subject | Pages | ISBN |
|---|---|---|---|---|---|
| Arms and Equipment Guide | Eric Cagle, Jesse Decker, Jeff Quick, Rich Redman, James Wyatt | March 1, 2003 | Describes various equipment that can be used in a campaign, including weapons, armour, gear, and vehicles. | 160 | 0-7869-2649-X |
| Weapons of Legacy | Bruce R. Cordell, Kolja Raven Liquette, Travis Stout | May 1, 2005 | Describes unique weapons that have been forged or used by legendary beings and have unique gameplay properties. | 224 | 0-7869-3688-6 |
| Spell Compendium | Matthew Sernett, Jeff Grubb, Mike McArtor | December 1, 2005 | Contains spells (in some cases updated) from various previous sources (including the Complete-series, Dragon magazine, Draconomicon, Manual of the Planes and publications from the Wizards of the Coast-website, as well as new spells. | 288 | 0-7869-3702-5 |
| Magic Item Compendium | Andy Collins, Mike Mearls, Stephen Schubert, Eytan Bernstein, Frank Brunner, John Snead, Owen K.C. Stephens | March 13, 2007 | Contains descriptions of magic items (in some cases updated) from various previous sources (including the Arms and Equipment Guide, Magic of Faerûn, and Complete Divine, as well as new spells. | 224 | 978-0-7869-4345-6 |

=== Starter sets ===
| Title | Author | Date | Subject | Pages | ISBN |
|---|---|---|---|---|---|
| Dungeons & Dragons Adventure Game (2000) | Jason Carl, Andy Collins, David Noonan, Jonathan Tweet | August, 2000 | 3rd Ed, Orange cover, "Adventure Begins Here!" | 96 | 0-7869-1641-9 |
| Dungeons & Dragons Basic Game (2004) | Jonathan Tweet | September, 2004 | v3.5, Black dragon cover | 64 | 0-7869-3409-3 |
| Dungeons & Dragons Basic Game (2006) | Jonathan Tweet | September, 2006 | v3.5, Blue dragon cover | 64 | 0-7869-3944-3 |
| Dungeons & Dragons Player's Kit | Wizards Team | February, 2007 | — | 160 | 0-7869-3945-1 |

== Dungeons & Dragons 4th edition ==
The books from the "main" product line of 4th Edition are split into Core Rules and Supplement books. Unlike third edition of Dungeons & Dragons, which had the core rulebooks released in monthly installments, the 4th editions of the Player's Handbook, Monster Manual, and Dungeon Master's Guide were all released in June 2008.

In addition, beginning in September 2010 the stand-alone Essentials product line was released, aiming at novice players.

Preview releases

| Title | Author | Date | Pages | ISBN |
|---|---|---|---|---|
| Wizards Presents: Races and Classes | Wizards RPG Team | December 18, 2007 | 96 | 978-0-7869-4801-7 |
| Wizards Presents: Worlds and Monsters | Wizards RPG Team | January 15, 2008 | 96 | 978-0-7869-4802-4 |

=== Core rules ===
| Title | Author | Date | Pages | ISBN |
|---|---|---|---|---|
| Player's Handbook - Arcane, Divine, and Martial Heroes | Rob Heinsoo, Andy Collins, James Wyatt, and Matt Sernett | June 6, 2008 | 320 | 978-0-7869-4867-3 |
| Dungeon Master's Guide | Matt Sernett and Wizards RPG Team | June 6, 2008 | 224 | 978-0-7869-4880-2 |
| Monster Manual | Mike Mearls, Stephen Schubert, James Wyatt, and Matt Sernett | June 6, 2008 | 288 | 978-0-7869-4852-9 |
| Player's Handbook 2 - Primal, Arcane, and Divine Heroes | Jeremy Crawford | March 17, 2009 | 224 | 978-0-7869-5016-4 |
| Monster Manual 2 | Rob Heinsoo | May 19, 2009 | 224 | 978-0-7869-5101-7 |
| Dungeon Master's Guide 2 | James Wyatt | September 15, 2009 | 224 | 978-0-7869-5244-1 |
| Player's Handbook 3 - Psionic, Divine, and Primal Heroes | Mike Mearls | March 16, 2010 | 224 | 978-0-7869-5390-5 |
| Monster Manual 3 | Mike Mearls | June 15, 2010 | 224 | 978-0-7869-5490-2 |

=== Character options ===
| Title | Author | Date | Pages | ISBN |
|---|---|---|---|---|
| Martial Power - Options for Fighters, Rangers, Rogues, and Warlords | Wizards RPG Team | November 18, 2008 | 160 | 978-0-7869-4981-6 |
| Arcane Power - Options for Bards, Sorcerers, Swordmages, Warlocks and Wizards | Wizards RPG Team | April 21, 2009 | 160 | 978-0-7869-4957-1 |
| Divine Power - Options for Avengers, Clerics, Invokers and Paladins | Wizards RPG Team | July 21, 2009 | 160 | 978-0-7869-4982-3 |
| Primal Power - Options for Barbarians, Druids, Shamans and Wardens | Wizards RPG Team | October 20, 2009 | 160 | 978-0-7869-5023-2 |
| Player's Handbook Races: Dragonborn | Wizards RPG Team | January 19, 2010 | 32 | 978-0-7869-5386-8 |
| Martial Power 2 - Options for Fighters, Rangers, Rogues, and Warlords | Wizards RPG Team | February 16, 2010 | 160 | 978-0-7869-5389-9 |
| Player's Strategy Guide | Andy Collins | May 18, 2010 | 160 | 978-0-7869-5488-9 |
| Player's Handbook Races: Tieflings | Wizards RPG Team | June 15, 2010 | 32 | 978-0-7869-5489-6 |
| Psionic Power - Options for Ardents, Battleminds, Monks and Psions | Wizards RPG Team | August 17, 2010 | 160 | 978-0-7869-5560-2 |
| Player's Option: Heroes of Shadow | Wizards RPG Team | April 19, 2011 | 160 | 978-0-7869-5745-3 |
| Player's Option: Heroes of the Feywild | Wizards RPG Team | November 15, 2011 | 160 | 978-0-7869-5836-8 |
| Player's Option: Heroes of the Elemental Chaos | Wizards RPG Team | February 21, 2012 | 160 | 978-0-7869-5981-5 |

=== Monsters & NPCs ===
| Title | Author | Date | Pages | ISBN |
|---|---|---|---|---|
| Draconomicon: Chromatic Dragons | Ari Marmell | November 18, 2008 | 256 | 978-0-7869-4980-9 |
| Open Grave: Secrets of the Undead | Bruce R. Cordell | January 20, 2009 | 224 | 978-0-7869-5069-0 |
| Draconomicon: Metallic Dragons | Richard Baker | November 17, 2009 | 224 | 978-0-7869-5248-9 |
| Demonomicon | Brian R. James | July 20, 2010 | 160 | 978-0-7869-5492-6 |
| Monster Vault: Threats to the Nentir Vale | Sterling Hershey | June 15, 2011 | 128 | 978-0-7869-5838-2 |

=== Optional rules ===
| Title | Author | Date | Pages | ISBN |
|---|---|---|---|---|
| Dragon Magazine Annual 2009 | Torah Cottrill | August 2009 | 160 | 978-0-7869-5245-8 |
| Dungeon Magazine Annual 2010 | Torah Cottrill, Miranda Horner, and Chris Youngs | May 2010 | 160 | 978-0-7869-5200-7 |
| Book of Vile Darkness | Robert J. Schwalb | December 27, 2011 | 128 | 978-0-7869-5868-9 |

=== Settings ===
| Title | Author | Date | Subject | Pages | ISBN |
|---|---|---|---|---|---|
Campaign worlds
| Eberron Player's Guide | David Noonan | June 16, 2009 | Provides rules for player characters in the Eberron campaign setting, including three player races and a new class. | 160 | 978-0-7869-5100-0 |
| Eberron Campaign Guide | James Wyatt | July 21, 2009 | Describes the campaign setting of Eberron, which combines a fantasy tone with pulp elements and steam-age technology. | 288 | 978-0-7869-5099-7 |
| Dark Sun Campaign Setting | Robert J. Schwalb | August 17, 2010 | Describes the campaign setting of Dark Sun, set in the post-apocalyptic desert world of Athas. | 224 | 978-0-7869-5493-3 |
| Dark Sun Creature Catalog | Chris Sims | August 17, 2010 | Statistics for monsters, major NPCs and hazards in the Dark Sun setting. | 144 | 978-0-7869-5494-0 |
| The Shadowfell: Gloomwrought and Beyond | Andy Clautice | May 12, 2011 | Provides information needed to run adventures in the Shadowfell, a subplane that exists in multiple campaign settings. | 31 | 978-0-7869-5848-1 |
Environments and sites
| Manual of the Planes | Richard Baker, Robert J. Schwalb, and James Wyatt | December 16, 2008 | ― | 160 | 978-0-7869-5002-7 |
| Dungeon Delve | Greg Marks | March 3, 2009 | ― | 160 | 978-0-7869-5139-0 |
| The Plane Below: Secrets of the Elemental Chaos | Ari Marmell, Bruce R Cordell, and Luke Johnson | December 15, 2009 | ― | 160 | 978-0-7869-5249-6 |
| Hammerfast: A Dwarven Outpost Adventure Site | Mike Mearls | March 16, 2010 | ― | 32 | 978-0-7869-5534-3 |
| The Plane Above: Secrets of the Astral Sea | Rob Heinsoo | April 20, 2010 | ― | 160 | 978-0-7869-5392-9 |
| Vor Rukoth: An Ancient Ruins Adventure Site | Greg Bilsland | July 20, 2010 | ― | 32 | 978-0-7869-5549-7 |
| Into the Unknown: The Dungeon Survival Handbook | Logan Bonner, Matt Sernett, and Jeff Morgenroth | May 15, 2012 | ― | 159 | 978-0-7869-6032-3 |

=== Spells & Items ===
| Title | Author | Date | Pages | ISBN |
|---|---|---|---|---|
| Adventurer's Vault: Arms and equipment for all character classes | Logan Bonner, Eytan Bernstein, and Chris Sims | September 16, 2008 | 224 | 978-0-7869-4978-6 |
| Adventurer's Vault 2: Arms and equipment for all character classes | Rob Heinsoo | August 18, 2009 | 160 | 978-0-7869-5204-5 |
| Mordenkainen's Magnificent Emporium | Jeremy Crawford | September 20, 2011 | 160 | 978-0-7869-5744-6 |

=== Starter sets ===
| Title | Author | Date | Subject | Pages | ISBN |
|---|---|---|---|---|---|
Boxed sets
| Dungeons & Dragons Roleplaying Game Starter Set (Blue box cover) | ― | October 21, 2008 | 16-page Quick Start Rules booklet and a 64-page Dungeon Master's Booklet | 80 | 978-0-7869-4820-8 |
| Dungeons & Dragons Fantasy Roleplaying Game Starter Set (Red box cover) | ― | September 7, 2010 | 32-page booklet for players and a 64-page booklet for Dungeon Masters | 96 | 978-0-7869-5629-6 |
Essentials products
| Rules Compendium | Wizards RPG Team | September 21, 2010 | ― | 320 | 978-0-7869-5621-0 |
| Heroes of the Fallen Lands | Wizards RPG Team | September 2010 | ― | 368 | 978-0-7869-5620-3 |
| Dungeon Master's Kit | Wizards RPG Team | October 19, 2010 | ― | 320 | 978-0-7869-5630-2 |
| Heroes of the Forgotten Kingdoms | Wizards RPG Team | November 2010 | ― | 352 | 978-0-7869-5619-7 |
| Monster Vault | Wizards RPG Team | 2010 | ― | 192 | 978-0-7869-5631-9 |

== Dungeons & Dragons 5th edition ==
Initially promoted in playtest materials as Dungeons & Dragons Next, the fifth edition of Dungeons & Dragons was released in a staggered fashion through the second half of 2014. Unlike previous editions, this edition of the game was developed partly via a public open playtest. An early build of the new edition debuted at the 2012 Dungeons & Dragons Experience event to about 500 fans. Public playtesting began on May 24, 2012, with the final playtest packet released on September 20, 2013.

The 5th edition's Basic Rules, a free PDF containing complete rules for play and a subset of the player and DM content from the core rulebooks, was released on July 3, 2014. The basic rules have continued to be updated since then to incorporate errata for the corresponding portions of the Player's Handbook and combine the Player's Basic Rules and Dungeon Master's Basic Rules into a single document. Public playtests continued through the Unearthed Arcana series, which was published for free online in PDF format.

=== Core rules ===
As part of the 2024 revision to the 5th Edition ruleset, the three revised core rulebooks were released staggered between September 2024 and February 2025.

| Title | Author | Date | Subject | Pages | ISBN |
|---|---|---|---|---|---|
| Player's Handbook (2014) | Richard Baker, Jeremy Crawford, Bruce R. Cordell, James Wyatt, and Robert J. Schwalb | August 19, 2014 | Essential rules for playing the game, including player abilities | 320 | 978-0-7869-6560-1 |
| Dungeon Master's Guide (2014) | Wizards RPG Team | December 9, 2014 | Advice for running games and optional rules | 320 | 978-0-7869-6562-5 |
| Monster Manual (2014) | Mike Mearls, Jeremy Crawford, Chris Sims, Rodney Thompson, Lee Peter, Robert J. Schwalb, Matt Sernett, Steve Townshend, James Wyatt, and Wizards RPG Team | September 17, 2014 | Stats of the most common monsters, animals, and generic NPCs | 352 | 978-0-7869-6561-8 |
| Player's Handbook (2024) | Wizards RPG Team | September 17, 2024 | Backwards-compatible revision of 2014 Player's Handbook | 384 | 978-0-7869-6951-7 |
| Dungeon Master's Guide (2024) | Wizards RPG Team | November 12, 2024 | Backwards-compatible revision of 2014 Dungeon Master's Guide | 384 | 978-0-7869-6952-4 |
| Monster Manual (2024) | Wizards RPG Team | February 18, 2025 | Backwards-compatible revision of 2014 Monster Manual | 384 | 9780786969548 |

=== Character options ===
| Title | Author | Date | Subject | Pages | ISBN |
|---|---|---|---|---|---|
| Xanathar's Guide to Everything | Wizards RPG Team | November 12, 2017 | Adds 31 subclasses and numerous optional tools for Dungeon Masters. | 192 | 978-0-7869-6611-0 |
| Tasha's Cauldron of Everything | Wizards RPG Team | November 17, 2020 | Adds 31 subclasses and numerous optional tools for Dungeon Masters. | 192 | 978-0-7869-6702-5 |
| Arcana Unleashed | TBA | September 15, 2026 | Part of the "Season of Magic". Expands on the magic options for players, including a new magic item system. | | 9780786970063 |

=== Monsters & NPCs ===
| Title | Author | Date | Subject | Pages | ISBN |
|---|---|---|---|---|---|
| Volo's Guide to Monsters | Mike Mearls | November 15, 2016 | Adds a variety of new playable races and new monsters. | 224 | 978-0-7869-6601-1 |
| Mordenkainen's Tome of Foes | Jeremy Crawford | May 29, 2018 | Adds a variety of new playable races and new monsters. | 256 | 978-0-7869-6624-0 |
| Fizban's Treasury of Dragons | Wizards RPG Team | October 26, 2021 | Adds new species of dragon and draconic themed player character options. | 224 | 978-0-7869-6729-2 |
| Mordenkainen Presents: Monsters of the Multiverse | Jeremy Crawford | May 16, 2022 | Revises and replaces Volo's Guide to Monsters (2016) and Mordenkainen's Tome of Foes (2018). | 288 | 978-0-7869-6787-2 |
| Bigby Presents: Glory of the Giants | Wizards RPG Team | August 15, 2023 | Character options and advice for Dungeon Masters about giants. | 192 | 978-0-7869-6898-5 |

=== Settings ===
| Title | Author | Date | Subject | Pages | ISBN |
|---|---|---|---|---|---|
Eberron
| Eberron: Rising from the Last War | Wizards RPG Team | November 19, 2019 | Describes the world of Eberron and the classes and races of that world. Includes the adventure Forgotten Relics (levels 1-2). | 320 | 978-0-7869-6689-9 |
| Eberron: Forge of the Artificer | Wizards RPG Team | December 9, 2025 | Expands on the world of Eberron. Revises artificer and species of that world. Includes three adventure outlines. | 112 | 9780786970001 |
Forgotten Realms
| Sword Coast Adventurer's Guide | Wizards RPG Team, Green Ronin | November 3, 2015 | Describes the Sword Coast region of Faerûn. | 159 | 978-0-7869-6580-9 |
| Acquisitions Incorporated | Wizards RPG Team, Penny Arcade | June 18, 2019 | Based on the podcast of the same name. Includes the adventure The Orrery of the Wanderer (levels 1-7). | 224 | 978-0-7869-6690-5 |
| Forgotten Realms: Adventures in Faerûn | Wizards RPG Team | November 11, 2025 | Locations and lore about the Forgotten Realms as well as monsters and adventures for dungeon masters. | 288 | 978-0786969951 |
| Forgotten Realms: Heroes of Faerûn | Wizards RPG Team | November 11, 2025 | Adds new subclasses, backgrounds, spells and equipment for characters in the Forgotten Realms. Describes factions and gods that characters can join or oppose. | 192 | 978-0786969937 |
Magic: The Gathering
| Guildmasters' Guide to Ravnica | Wizards RPG Team | November 20, 2018 | Describes the world of Ravnica from Magic: The Gathering. Includes the adventure Krenko's Way (levels 1-2). | 256 | 978-0-7869-6659-2 |
| Mythic Odysseys of Theros | Wizards RPG Team | June 2, 2020 (digital), July 21, 2020 (physical) | Describes the world of Theros from Magic: The Gathering. Includes the adventure No Silent Secret (levels 1-2). | 256 | 978-0-7869-6701-8 |
| Strixhaven: A Curriculum of Chaos | Wizards RPG Team | December 7, 2021 | Describes the magical university of Strixhaven from Magic: The Gathering. Includes the adventures School is in Session, Hunt for the Mage Tower, The Magister's Masquerade, and A Reckoning in Ruins (levels 1-4 / 4-6 / 6-8 / 8-10). | 224 | 978-0-7869-6744-5 |
Ravenloft
| Van Richten's Guide to Ravenloft | Wizards RPG Team | May 18, 2021 | Describes the world of Ravenloft and the variant rules of that world. Includes the adventure The House of Lament (levels 1-3). | 256 | 978-0-7869-6725-4 |
| Ravenloft: The Horrors Within | TBA | June 16, 2026 | Part of the "Season of Horror". Expands on the world of Ravenloft with new player and dungeon master options. | | 9780786970025 |
Other
| Explorer's Guide to Wildemount | Matthew Mercer, Chris Lockey, James Introcaso, James Haeck, Wizards RPG Team | March 17, 2020 | Describes the world of Exandria from the web series Critical Role. Includes the adventures Tide of Retribution, Dangerous Designs, Frozen Sick, and Unwelcome Spirits (levels 1-3 for each starter adventure). | 304 | 978-0-7869-6691-2 |
| Dungeons & Dragons: World of Warcraft | James Wyatt, Joey Haeck, Ari Marmell, Ben Petrisor, Erin Roberts, Carl Sibley, Jason Tondro | November 17, 2026 | | | 978-0-7869-7010-0 |

=== Starter sets ===
| Title | Date | Subject | Levels | ISBN |
|---|---|---|---|---|
| Starter Set | July 15, 2014 | Basic rules I, Lost Mine of Phandelver adventure module, dice, and 5 pre-generated character sheets. | 1–5 | 978-0-7869-6559-5 |
| Dungeons & Dragons Essentials Kit | June 24, 2019 | Basic rules II (Expanded); the Dragon of Icespire Peak adventure module; 11 dice; a unique DM Screen; a double-sided poster map; 81 cards for magic items, sidekicks, initiative, conditions and quests; and 6 blank character sheets. | 1–6 | 978-0-7869-6683-7 |
| Starter Set: Dragons of Stormwreck Isle | July 31, 2022 | Basic rules III, Dragons of Stormwreck Isle adventure module, dice, and 5 pre-generated character sheets | 1–3 | 978-0-7869-6559-5 |
| Heroes of the Borderlands Starter Set | September 16, 2025 | Boxed set introducing the game to new players. Includes an adventure inspired by Gary Gygax module The Keep on the Borderlands. | 1-3 | |

=== Boxed sets ===
| Title | Date | Subject | Levels | ISBN |
|---|---|---|---|---|
| Dungeons & Dragons Core Rules Gift Set | November 20, 2018 | Foil cover editions of the Player's Handbook, Dungeon Master's Guide, and Monster Manual, along with a DM Screen. | — | 978-0-7869-6662-2 |
| Stranger Things Dungeons & Dragons Starter Set | May 1, 2019 | Basic rulebook, Hunt for the Thessalhydra adventure module, painted and plain Demogorgon miniature, and 5 pre-generated character sheets. | 3–4 | |
| Dungeons & Dragons vs. Rick and Morty | November 19, 2019 | Basic rules (Rick and Morty edition), The Lost Dungeon of Rickedness: Big Rick Energy adventure module, 11 dice, a DM Screen and 5 pre-generated character sheets. | 1–3 | 978-0-7869-6688-2 |
| Curse of Strahd: Revamped | October 20, 2020 | Softcover edition of Curse of Strahd, Creatures of Horror bestiary, a 54-card tarokka deck, a Tarokka Deck booklet, a DM Screen, double-sided poster map, Strahd cover sheet, tuck box for the cards and 12 postcards. | 1–10 | 978-0-7869-6715-5 |
| Dungeons & Dragons Rules Expansion Gift Set | January 25, 2022 | Special editions of Xanathar's Guide to Everything, Tasha's Cauldron of Everything, and Mordenkainen Presents: Monsters of the Multiverse, along with a new DM Screen. | — | |
| Spelljammer: Adventures in Space | August 16, 2022 | Includes a Dungeon Master's screen, a double-sided poster map and three 64-page hardcover books: Astral Adventurer’s Guide (a Dungeon Master guide), Boo's Astral Menagerie (a bestiary), and Light of Xaryxis (an adventure module). A specialty cover edition will also be released. | 5–8 | 978-0-7869-6816-9 |
| Planescape: Adventures in the Multiverse | October 17, 2023 | Includes a campaign setting guide, monster bestiary, and the adventure Turn of Fortune's Wheel. | 3–10, 17 | 978-0-7869-6904-3 |
| The Deck of Many Things | November 14, 2023 (digital release); January 5, 2024 (physical release) | A three-part product which includes two hardcover books, The Book of Many Things and Card Reference Guide, and a deck of 66 tarot-style cards. The digital edition includes only The Book of Many Things. | — | |
| Stranger Things: Welcome to the Hellfire Club | October 7, 2025 | It will feature four adventure modules with each module corresponding to a single season of Stranger Things along with five pre-generated character sheets "across three levels of play", tokens for characters and monsters, cards for magic items, monsters, and spells, and various handouts. | TBA | |

=== Digital and print-on-demand releases ===
| Title | Author | Date | Pages | Levels | Notes |
|---|---|---|---|---|---|
| Basic Rules | Jeremy Crawford, Mike Mearls, Christopher Perkins | July 3, 2014 (PDF) | 180 | ― | ― |
| Elemental Evil Player's Companion | Richard Baker, Robert J. Schwalb, Stephen Schubert | March 10, 2015 (PDF), April 17, 2015 (POD) | 25 | ― | |
Dungeon Masters Guild
| The Tortle Package | Wizards RPG Team | September 19, 2017 (PDF) | 28 | ― | Proceeds are donated to Extra Life fundraiser |
| One Grung Above | Christopher Lindsay | October 11, 2017 (PDF) | 4 | ― | Proceeds are donated to Extra Life fundraiser |
| The Lost Kenku | Wizards RPG Team | November 28, 2017 (PDF) | 9 | 4 | Proceeds are donated to Extra Life fundraiser |
| Wayfinder's Guide to Eberron | Wizards RPG Team | July 23, 2018 (PDF) | 175 | ― | |
| Lost Laboratory of Kwalish | Wizards RPG Team | November 10, 2018 (PDF), January 9, 2019 (POD) | 61 | 5-10 | Proceeds are donated to Extra Life fundraiser |
| Locathah Rising | Wizards RPG Team | September 19, 2019 (PDF) | 39 | 9-10 | Proceeds are donated to Extra Life fundraiser |
| Infernal Machine Rebuild | Wizards RPG Team | November 12, 2019 (PDF) | 111 | 5-10 | Proceeds are donated to Extra Life fundraiser |
| Mordenkainen's Fiendish Folio, Volume 1: Monsters Malevolent and Benign | Wizards RPG Team | November 12, 2019 (PDF) | 21 | ― | Proceeds are donated to Extra Life fundraiser |
| Return to the Glory | Wizards RPG Team | May 21, 2020 (PDF) | 38 | 6-8 | Proceeds are donated to Red Nose Day fundraiser |
| Domains of Delight | Adam Lee | September 21, 2021 (PDF) | 36 | ― | Corresponds with the adventure module The Wild Beyond the Witchlight (2021). Proceeds are donated to Extra Life fundraiser |
| Minsc and Boo's Journal of Villainy | Wizards RPG Team | October 5, 2021 (PDF) | 158 | ― | Proceeds are donated to Extra Life fundraiser |
| Chains of Asmodeus | James Ohlen, Brent Knowles, Adrian Tchaikovsky | October 30, 2023 (PDF), January 26, 2024 (POD) | 286 | 11-20 | Proceeds are donated to Extra Life fundraiser |
