= Mordenkainen's Magnificent Emporium =

2011 role-playing game supplement

- Author: Jeremy Crawford, Stephen Schubert, Matthew Sernett
- Genre: Role-playing game
- Publisher: Wizards of the Coast
- Publication date: September 20, 2011
- Media type: Print
- Pages: 160
- ISBN: 978-0-7869-5744-6

Mordenkainen's Magnificent Emporium is a supplement to the 4th edition of the Dungeons & Dragons role-playing game. While this book was published after the Essentials line officially ended in 2010, it served as a replacement for the main magical item supplements, Adventurer's Vaults (2008-2009), from the Essentials line.

== Contents ==
Mordenkainen's Magnificent Emporium is a 160-page source book on items and magical treasures for both Dungeon Masters and players in the 4th edition. Lore or other details are included for every item in the book. Along with sidebars throughout the book, each chapter starts with in-character introduction from the fictional wizard Mordenkainen:

By cataloguing what exists—and what is rumored to exist—I hope to be forewarned of the danger of any item when it falls into the wrong hands. Soon I will share this knowledge—if not with the world, then with the Circle of Eight. Surely someone besides myself should be armed with this knowledge. I suppose, if you are reading this, I have already chosen to share it. In that case, I hope you take what you learn here and put it to sensible use. I would not have this book used as some plunderer’s to-do list! Instead, tread lightly, act wisely, be wary, and be well. — Mordenkainen

The table of contents lists the follow sections:

- Introduction
- Chapter 1: Armor
- Chapter 2: Weapons
- Chapter 3: Implements
- Chapter 4: Magical Gear
- Chapter 5: Artifacts and Curses
- Chapter 6: Adventuring Gear
- Appendix 1: Hirelings and Henchmen
- Appendix 2: Magic Item Stories
- Appendix 3: Item Levels as Treasure
- Appendix 4: Item Lists

Shannon Appelcline, author of Designers & Dragons, wrote: "Mordenkainen's Magnificent Emporium features some reprinted material. About a quarter of the magic items in the book were originally published (in a somewhat different form) in Adventurer's Vault 1 (2008) or Adventurer's Vault 2. The Emporium also contains an article on henchmen and hirelings that had previously appeared in Dragon #397 (March 2011). Finally, the idea of implements originated with Player's Handbook 3 (2010)."

== Publication history ==
Mordenkainen's Magnificent Emporium was written by Tavis Allison, Scott Fitzgerald Gray, Robert J. Schwalb, Matt Sernett, and Jeff Tidball, with development by Jeremy Crawford and Stephen Schubert. It is an updated book about magic items that was published on September 20, 2011. It was exclusively released at local game stores and was not made available for purchase through online stores such as Amazon. The book was re-released as a PDF on November 10, 2015.

Appelcline highlighted that this book nearly did not exist at all - the book "was first announced late in 2010 with a release date of April 19, 2011. Unfortunately, that put it right in the crosshairs of a series of cancellations that would eventually lead to the death of D&D 4e (2011-2012). Mordenkainen's Magnificent Emporium was thus cancelled on January 12, 2011, as part of the same announcement that moved Heroes of Shadow (2011) back a month and killed "Class Compendium: Heroes of Sword and Spell" and "Hero Builder's Handbook" entirely. That was it for those other books [...], but Mordenkainen's Magnificent Emporium was lucky enough to make it back onto Wizards' production schedule. In August, Wizards announced that it was returning as a September release".

== Reception ==
DieHard GameFan wrote: "Mordenkainen’s Magnificent Emporium is a book filled with both fluff and crunch. You have tons of stats for new magic items and new feats mixed with the backstories and descriptions of the unique magic items. [...] Really I don’t see the need to have more than one copy of this at the gaming table. But I think there definitely should be one copy of this at the gaming table".

Appelcline wrote, on the book not being available through online stores, "though this was probably intended as a nice benefit for game retailers, it wasn't as well appreciated by fans, some of whom complained that it dramatically increased the price of the book (because they usually bought from said deep discounters)".
