= Newton Ewell =

American artist

- Newton Ewell at CONduit 17 in Salt Lake City, Utah.
- Born: October 1962 (age 63); Saint Louis, Missouri
- Known for: Fantasy art

Newton H. Ewell is an artist whose work has appeared in role-playing games.

== Early life ==
Newton Ewell was born in October 1962, in St. Louis, Missouri.

Ewell was a part of the Sci-Fi and Convention scene in and around the Washington D.C. Area during the 1970s and 80's. Widely known for rendering detailed illustrations of starships and space stations and related Sci-Fi Fantasy matter.

== Career ==
Newton Ewell has done artwork for the Dungeons & Dragons role-playing game, including interior art for the Treasure Maps set (1992), and was an interior artist for both SJR2 Realmspace (1991) and SJR7 Krynnspace (1992), as well as the War Captains Companion (1992). He also designed ships and created map art for SJR2 Realmspace. Additionally, he has a design credit for both the MC7 Monstrous Compendium Spelljammer Appendix (1990), and the MC9 Monstrous Compendium Spelljammer Appendix II (1991), and was the author of HWR2 Kingdom of Nithia (1991). He also worked as an editor on projects such as Wild Things (1990), Vikings Campaign Sourcebook (1991), Dark Sun's The Complete Gladiator's Handbook (1992), and AC1010 Poor Wizard's Almanac & Book of Facts (1992).
