= Jeremy Crawford =

American game designer

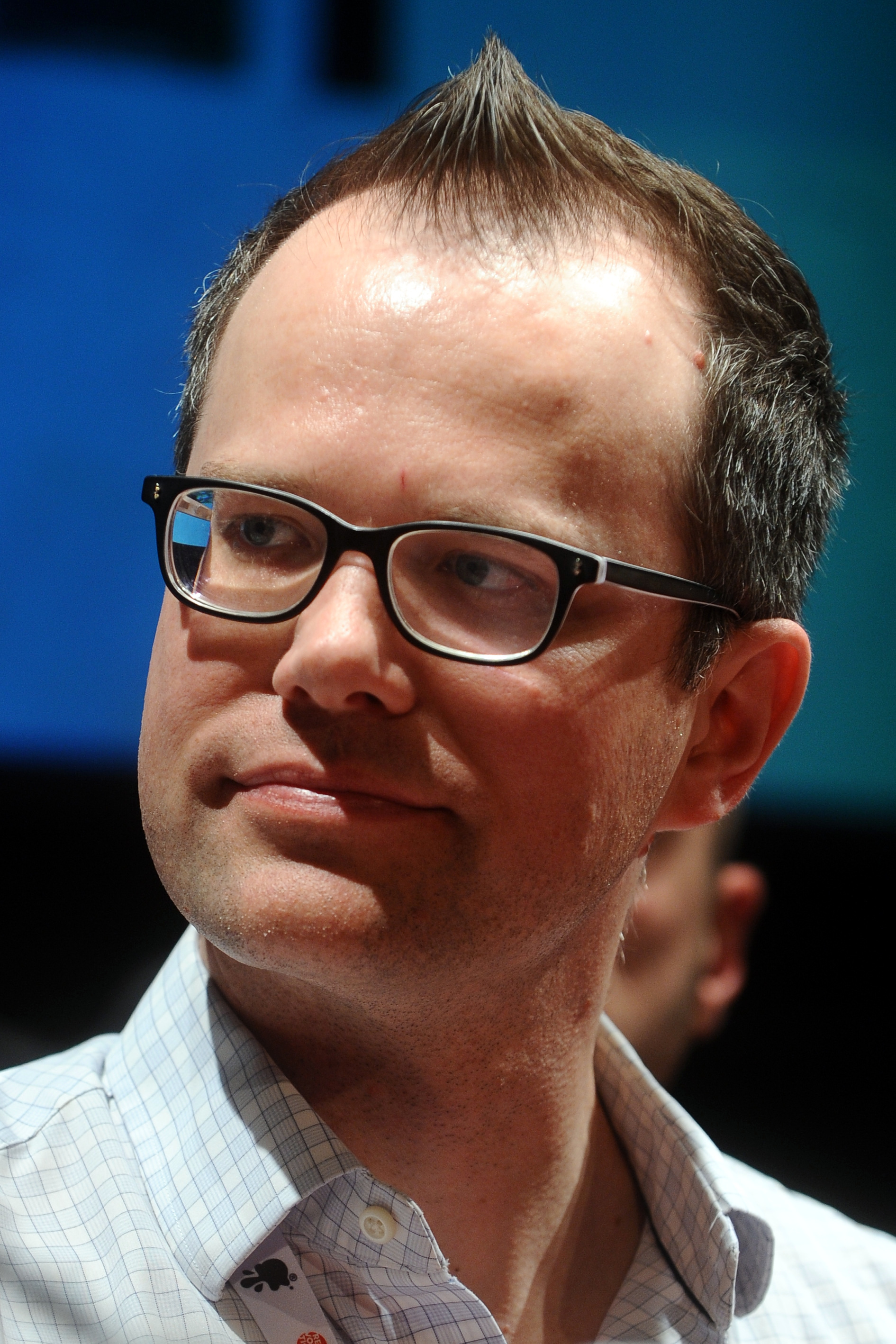
- Jeremy Crawford, one of the Lead Designers of Dungeons & Dragons 5th Edition, at Lucca Comics & Games 2014.
- Occupation: Game designer
- Spouse: Phillip Lienau (m. 2014)

Jeremy Crawford is a game designer who has worked primarily on role-playing games. He worked for Wizards of the Coast from 2007 to 2025 on the tabletop role-playing game Dungeons & Dragons. He was the Lead Rules Designer for the game's 4th edition, and one of the Lead Designers of the game's 5th Edition. In 2025, he became the Game Director of Darrington Press.

== Career ==
=== Green Ronin Publishing (2005–2007) ===
Jeremy Crawford co-designed and edited the Blue Rose (2005) role-playing game along with Steve Kenson for Green Ronin Publishing. Blue Rose won the 2005 ENnie Awards for "Best Rules" and "Best d20 Game". Crawford is credited on the updated edition of Blue Rose (2017) as it carried forward parts of the setting design from the original edition. He also worked on the second edition of Warhammer Fantasy Roleplay and Mutants & Masterminds.

=== Wizards of the Coast (2007–2025) ===
He was hired by Wizards of the Coast in 2007 as a game designer for their flagship Dungeons & Dragons product. His Dungeons & Dragons design credits include Player's Handbook 2 (2009), Dungeon Master's Kit (2010), and Heroes of the Fallen Lands (2010).

He was the rules manager for the 4th Edition of Dungeons & Dragons. Development on a new edition started in 2011 and Crawford became the Co-Lead Designer, along with Mike Mearls, of the 5th Edition of Dungeons & Dragons. Crawford also became the lead rules developer and managing editor of the edition. Under Crawford and Mearls, there became a concerted effort to boost inclusiveness both in the game and in the development of the game. The 5th Edition version of the game credits women as contributors to its design more than any previous one: about 26 percent are female, as opposed to 20 percent in 4th Edition and 12 percent in 3rd Edition. The Mary Sue reported that under this new direction, 40% of Dungeons & Dragons players in 2018 are women which is an increase "from 2012, when women made up 20–25% of players". He is credited as one of the authors of the Player's Handbook for the 5th edition of Dungeons & Dragons, along with several other books in the edition. He also wrote the monthly "Sage Advice" newsletter.

In December 2018, Crawford took over as the Dungeon Master for Dungeons & Dragons actual play series Acquisitions Incorporated, which was previously helmed by colleague Chris Perkins.

In 2024, he became the Game Director of Dungeons & Dragons. He was the lead designer on the Player's Handbook (2024) which was part of the 2024 revision to the 5th Edition ruleset. Crawford won the Gayming Icon Award for his Dungeons & Dragons game design in 2024. In April 2025, following the release of the 2024 revised core rulebooks for Dungeons & Dragons, Crawford announced that he was leaving Wizards of the Coast.

=== Darrington Press (2025–present) ===
In June 2025, it was announced that both Crawford and Chris Perkins would be joining Critical Role Productions' tabletop game imprint Darrington Press. Crawford became the company's Game Director while Perkins became the Creative Director which matches their former roles at Wizards of the Coast. Crawford explained that "Chris and I talked about his retirement plan for years, so his approaching departure was long on my mind" along with the release of the 2024 revised Dungeons & Dragons rulebooks led him to feel "it was time to explore a new chapter for myself". In July 2025, Darrington Press announced that Crawford will be creating a setting exploring a new genre for their tabletop role-playing game Daggerheart.

In November 2025 at PAX Unplugged, actual play series Acquisitions Incorporated rebooted using the Daggerheart system, with Crawford continuing as its gamemaster.

== Personal life ==
Crawford is gay, and married his husband Phillip Lienau in 2014.

== Works ==
Title	Game	Credits	Date	ISBN
Warhammer Fantasy Roleplay	Warhammer Fantasy Roleplay 2nd edition	Designer	2005	978-1844162208
Blue Rose	Blue Rose 1st edition	Designer, Editor	2005	978-1932442229
Blue Rose Companion	Blue Rose 1st edition	Designer, Production Staff	2005	978-1932442366
World of Aldea	Blue Rose 1st edition	Designer, Production Staff	2006	978-1932442465
Paragons	Mutants & Masterminds 2nd edition	Designer	2007	
Player's Handbook	Dungeons & Dragons 4th edition	Designer, Production Staff	2008	978-0786949298
Monster Manual	Dungeons & Dragons 4th edition	Designer, Production Staff	2008	978-0786948529
Forgotten Realms Player's Guide	Dungeons & Dragons 4th edition	Designer	2008	978-0786949298
4th Edition Core Rulebook Collection	Dungeons & Dragons 4th edition	Designer	2008	978-1786950638
Dungeon Master's Guide	Dungeons & Dragons 4th edition	Designer	2008	978-0786948802
Player's Handbook 2	Dungeons & Dragons 4th edition	Designer, Production Staff	2009	978-0-7869-5016-4
Assault on Nightwyrm Fortress	Dungeons & Dragons 4th edition	Designer	2009	978-0786950003
Player Essentials: Heroes of the Fallen Lands	Dungeons & Dragons 4th edition	Designer	2010	978-0786956203
Monster Manual 3	Dungeons & Dragons 4th edition	Designer	2010	978-0786954902
Dungeons & Dragons Starter Set	Dungeons & Dragons 4th edition	Designer, Production Staff	2010	978-0786956296
Dungeon Master's Kit	Dungeons & Dragons 4th edition	Designer	2010	978-0786956302
Player's Option: Heroes of the Feywild	Dungeons & Dragons 4th edition	Designer	2011	978-0786958368
Player's Option: Heroes of Shadow	Dungeons & Dragons 4th edition	Designer	2011	978-0786957453
Neverwinter Campaign Setting	Dungeons & Dragons 4th edition	Designer	2011	978-0786958146
Monster Vault: Threats to the Nentir Vale	Dungeons & Dragons 4th edition	Designer	2011	978-0786958382
Book of Vile Darkness	Dungeons & Dragons 4th edition	Designer	2011	978-0786958689
Player's Option: Heroes of the Elemental Chaos	Dungeons & Dragons 4th edition	Designer, Production Staff	2012	
Into the Unknown: The Dungeon Survival Handbook	Dungeons & Dragons 4th edition	Designer	2012	978-0786960323
Ghosts of Dragonspear Castle	Dungeons & Dragons 5th edition	Project Lead	August 2013	978-0786965311
Dungeons & Dragons Starter Set	Dungeons & Dragons 5th edition	D&D Lead Designer	15 July 2014	978-0786965595
Player's Handbook (2014)	Dungeons & Dragons 5th edition	D&D Lead Designer, Player's Handbook Lead	19 August 2014	978-0786965601
Monster Manual	Dungeons & Dragons 5th edition	D&D Lead Designer, Managing Editor	30 September 2014	978-0786965618
Dungeon Master's Guide	Dungeons & Dragons 5th edition	D&D Lead Designer, Dungeon Master's Guide Lead	9 December 2014	978-0786965625
Sword Coast Adventurer's Guide	Dungeons & Dragons 5th edition	Designer, Managing Editor, D&D Lead Designer	3 November 2015	978-0786965809
Elemental Evil Player's Companion	Dungeons & Dragons 5th edition	D&D Lead Designer, Managing Editor	16 April 2015	
Curse of Strahd	Dungeons & Dragons 5th edition	D&D Lead Designer, Designer, Managing Editor	15 March 2016	978-0786965984
Storm King's Thunder	Dungeons & Dragons 5th edition	D&D Lead Designer, Managing Editor	6 September 2016	9780786966004
Volo's Guide to Monsters	Dungeons & Dragons 5th edition	Lead Rules Developer, Managing Editor	15 November 2016	978-0786966011
Tales from the Yawning Portal	Dungeons & Dragons 5th edition	Lead Rules Developer, Managing Editor	4 April 2017	978-0-7869-6609-7
Tomb of Annihilation	Dungeons & Dragons 5th edition	Lead Rules Developer, Managing Editor	19 September 2017	9780786966103
Xanathar's Guide to Everything	Dungeons & Dragons 5th edition	Lead Designer, Managing Editor	21 November 2017	978-0786966110
Mordenkainen's Tome of Foes	Dungeons & Dragons 5th edition	Lead Designer, Managing Editor	29 May 2018	978-0786966240
Waterdeep: Dragon Heist	Dungeons & Dragons 5th edition	Rules Development, Managing Editor	18 September 2018	978-0786966592
Waterdeep: Dungeon of the Mad Mage	Dungeons & Dragons 5th edition	Managing Editor	20 November 2018	978-0786966264
Guildmasters' Guide to Ravnica	Dungeons & Dragons 5th edition	Lead Designer, Managing Editor, Ravnica World Design	20 November 2018	978-0786966592
Ghosts of Saltmarsh	Dungeons & Dragons 5th Edition	Developer	21 May 2019	978-0786966752
Player's Handbook (2024)	Dungeons & Dragons 5th edition	Lead Designer	17 September 2024	978-0786969821
