= Vor Rukoth =

Vor Rukoth: An Ancient Ruins Adventure Site
- Cover
- Rules required: Dungeons & Dragons 4th edition
- Campaign setting: Nentir Vale
- Authors: Greg Bilsland
- First published: July 20, 2010
- ISBN: 978-0-7869-5549-7

Vor Rukoth: An Ancient Ruins Adventure Site is a supplement to the 4th edition of the Dungeons & Dragons role-playing game.

== Contents ==
The fortress ruin of Vor Rukoth was once "a stronghold of the tiefling empire of Bael Turath" that "has fallen into ruin and become a haven for monsters". It is set in Nentir Vale but was also designed to fit into pre-existing homebrew campaign settings. Vor Rukoth contains "a fully detailed, ready-to-use fortress ruin, complete with secret locations, maps, adventure hooks, monster and NPC statistics, ready-to-play encounters, and a full-color, double-sided battle map".

Shannon Appelcline, author of Designers & Dragons, wrote that "besides detailing the geography of the city, Vor Rukoth also introduces several NPC factions. The idea of factions dates back to the d20 Modern line (2002-2006) and was now being well-used in D&D itself. Of course, Vor Rukoth also provides more information on tieflings and their ancient empire of Bael Turath. Both the emphasis on the Nentir Vale and on factions would continue right into the upcoming Essentials (2010) line".

== Publication history ==
Vor Rukoth was written by Greg Bilsland, and was the second release in the Adventure Site line published for the Dungeons & Dragons 4th edition setting Nentir Vale and was released on July 20, 2010. It was released as part of a Wizards of the Coast publishing experiment with shorter 32-page softcover saddle-stitched books. This was a short-lived experiment that ended in July 2010. On November 17, 2015, Vor Rukoth was re-released as a PDF.

Originally, the Nentir Vale was designed to be a setting described in adventure books rather than in standalone sourcebooks. The release of Hammerfast (2010) and Vor Rukoth "marked a major change in that policy. Alongside Underdark (2010), also released in early 2010, they were the first books to provide supplemental details on the geography of the Nentir Vale region".

== Reception ==
Appelcline commented that "Wizards said that book stores didn't like the saddle-stitched books because of the lack of printed spines — an irony for an industry built on books of that format, from the digest-sized OD&D supplements to the numerous short adventures of the '70s and '80s".

Neuroglyph Games, on EN World, wrote "if ever there were any Wizards of the Coast products that could be termed 'sleepers', in the movie-box-office sense of the word, then Vor Rukoth certainly qualifies to head that list. Unfairly brushed aside by the hype of other, more anticipated products being released before GenCon 2010, this gaming supplement is a rare dark jewel which deserves to be treasured and marveled at by 4E gamers of all types. As an adventure site, Vor Rukoth can be used again and again by Dungeon Masters to create adventures which range from simple delves to more complex intrigues. [...] When presented with a supplement which is this well-conceived, this cunningly written, and so modestly priced, never should a Dungeon Master refuse to add a book like Vor Rukoth to their bookshelves".

Paco Jaen, for G*M*S Magazine, wrote that "the book is perfect for Dungeon Masters looking for a mysterious adventure location that fits instantly and easily into their existing D&D campaigns".
