= Wizard's Spell Compendium =

- Volume 1
- Genre: Role-playing games
- Publisher: TSR
- Publication date: 1996-1998

The Wizard's Spell Compendium is a series of four volumes of accessories for the 2nd edition of the Advanced Dungeons & Dragons fantasy role-playing game, published in 1996-1998.

== Contents ==
The Wizard's Spell Compendium is a series of four books of spells for 2nd Edition Advanced Dungeons & Dragons which contains every spell published in TSR products published from 1975 to 1995 including Spells and Magic. This series updates every spell and provides the original source that the spell comes from, and lists the spells in alphabetical order, and indicates their world of origin using icons. Each volume includes a listing of spells found in that volume, broken down by level of spell, and then into special lists such as spells associated with a class or race, and the final volume includes a complete list of all the spells.

== Reception ==
Joe Kushner reviewed Wizard's Spell Compendium III in 1998, in Shadis #48. Kushner found the icons to denote the campaign setting of origin for a spell to be "handy reference tools which augment the speed in which a player or DM can quickly find spells from a particular world". He noted that while it is a good reference book to have, it does have its problems as "TSR failed to account for the massive reprinting of recent spells that this would bring into recently printed products [...] It is my fear that when TSR does this for the Priest spells next year, that they shall reprint those spells found in the priestly spell books in the Encyclopedia Magica and all of the spells in Prayers from the Faithful. Kushner concluded his review by saying "For those who do not have those product though, or for those who wish fully updated spells, for after all Spells and Magic, and numerous other sources such as Chronomancy, have evolved, this is a perfect book but still on the expensive side at almost twenty five dollars.

== Reviews ==
- Backstab #9 (Vol. III)
- Backstab #12 (Volume 4)
- Dragon #240 - short review of Volume One
