= The Shadowfell: Gloomwrought and Beyond =

Tabletop role-playing game supplement

The Shadowfell
- Cover of the first edition
- Authors: Andy Clautice, Erik Scott de Bie, Matt Goetz
- Language: English
- Subject: Role-playing games
- Genre: Dungeons & Dragons
- Publisher: Wizards of the Coast
- Publication date: 2011
- Publication place: United States
- Media type: Print (Trade hardcover)
- ISBN: 978-0-7869-5848-1

The Shadowfell: Gloomwrought and Beyond is a supplement for the 4th edition of the Dungeons & Dragons fantasy role-playing game.

== Contents ==
The Shadowfell contains the information a Dungeon Master needs to run adventures set in the plane known as the Shadowfell with details on locations such as the Darkreach Mountains, Dead Man's Cross and the House of Black Lanterns, Gloomwrought, Letherna, the Oblivion Bog, and Thyrin Gol. The boxed set edition included a 32-page encounter booklet, a 128-page booklet presenting the fully detailed city of Gloomwrought and the surrounding area, die-cut tokens, a foldout battle map, and one 30-card Despair Deck.

== Publication history ==
The Shadowfell was written by Andy Clautice, Erik Scott de Bie and Matt Goetz. It was officially released in May 2011. The boxed set was the second supplement Wizards of the Coast published with the theme of shadows in 2011. It was preceded by Heroes of Shadow (2011) and followed by the 4th Edition Encounters event Dark Legacy of Evard (2011) and the Free RPG Day adventure Domain of Dread: Histaven (2011).

The Despair Deck in the boxed set added an additional set of mechanics to the game where players would draw negative conditions, such as apathy, fear, and madness, that could be overcome when their characters achieved milestones that would then turn the negative condition into a beneficial condition. The deck conditions would be reset upon completing a long rest. "Chris Perkins requested a Shadowfell deck of cards, something to add a 'fun, random element' to the game. Greg Bisland came up with the Fear Deck, modeled after Ravenloft's Tarokka Deck, which first appearing in Forbidden Lore (1992). It eventually became Shadowfell's Despair Deck".

A pdf version of the booklet was published on April 28, 2015.

== Reception ==
John ONeill of Black Gate commented: "I have high hopes that this will usher in the return of the boxed adventure. But even if it doesn't, I'm very glad to have this one. My advice: grab it before it too becomes a collector's item."

Shannon Appelcline, author of Designers & Dragons, called the book "a nice complement to the earlier planar manuals: Manual of the Planes (2008), The Plane Below: Secrets of the Elemental Chaos (2009), and The Plane Above: Secrets of the Astral Sea (2010), leaving only a book on the Feywild to fill out the World Axis". Appelcline highlighted that "most fans felt the Shadowfell box was pretty flimsy, nothing like the sturdier Essentials boxes of 2010".
