= Will McLean (artist) =

Artist whose work has appeared in role-playing games

- Born: March 23, 1957; Wynnewood, Pennsylvania
- Died: October 24, 2015 (aged 58); Malvern, Pennsylvania
- Known for: Fantasy art

Will McLean (March 23, 1957 – October 24, 2015) was an artist whose work has appeared in role-playing games.

== Career ==
Will McLean created humorous artwork that was included in the original Dungeon Masters Guide, as well as in comics in Dragon. The inspiration for many of his cartoons came from his experiences in playing role-playing games. He had also done artwork for the original release of Wizardry.
