= Dungeons & Dragons Basic Game =

Role-playing game

The Dungeons & Dragons Basic Game is an introductory version of Dungeons & Dragons (D&D) role-playing game packaged in the form of a board game. The original game was released in 2004 by Wizards of the Coast and was designed by Jonathan Tweet, one of the D&D 3rd edition designers. A new version of this game was released in September 2006.

It is a simplified version that is still fully compatible with the full D&D version 3.5 game. Characters used in this game can be easily expanded for use in the full game, if players so desire. The game is designed to be able to be played with minimal preparation. Players choose one of the already designed character booklets and corresponding miniature. These booklets cover all the basic rules and abilities of their characters. A booklet is included for the Dungeon Master (DM) which covers the encounters and monsters and rules necessary to play the game.

== 2004 edition ==
Dungeons and Dragons game cover (2004)

The game is designed to be able to be played with minimal preparation, but with a slightly different design approach to doing this. Players choose one of the already designed character sheets and corresponding miniature, and need only read the Quick Start rules to start play. The DM needs only to read the First Adventure book in addition the Quick Start Rules.

Once the First Adventure has been played the Advanced rules contains everything needed to create and equip new characters and play adventures with them at first and second level. This book contains four classes, four races, some equipment, and spells, while hinting at the fuller selection of each available in the full game. It also contains an extension of the First Adventure that should allow players to reach at least second level and monsters and suggested maps so the Dungeon Master can start designing their own further adventures.

While the set is compatible with the 3.5 version rules, there are some minor differences implemented here for simplicity's sake. For instance, the basic rules state that a diagonal movement step counts as two squares instead of one, whereas the more complex rule is that it counts as 1.5 squares. In other areas, many 3.5 rules are simply left out, such as critical hits (there are none in the basic game) and inventory weight management.

The game includes:

- 16 fully painted plastic miniatures:
  - 4 heroes (Aramil/Sorcerer, Eberk/Cleric, Lidda/Rogue and Regdar/Fighter)
  - 4 kobolds (2 Skirmishers, 2 Warriors)
  - 2 orc warriors
  - 2 skeletons
  - 1 wolf skeleton
  - 1 dire rat
  - 1 troglodyte
  - 1 young black dragon
- 4 double-sided dungeon map tiles
- 4 character sheets
- 7 dice (one of each: black d4, red d6, blue d8, green d10 & purple d10%, yellow d12, orange d20)
- Quick Start Rules
- First Adventure Book
- Advanced Rulebook

The Advanced Rulebook contains 16 black and white "stat cards" (pre-cut cardstock from the back fold of the book) corresponding to the 16 miniatures. These cards are in the format of the Dungeons & Dragons Miniatures Game and allow use of the miniatures with that game. The Advanced Rulebook covers advancing characters to second level and the final encounter with the black dragon.

== 2006 edition ==
The 2006 edition follows a similar format to the 2004 Edition, but contains the following:

- 12 fully painted plastic miniatures:
  - 4 heroes (Lanin/Wizard, Dothal/Cleric, Carn/Rogue, Regdar/Fighter)
  - 2 goblins (1 archer, 1 warrior)
  - 1 orc mauler
  - 1 skeleton
  - 1 harpy
  - 1 young minotaur
  - 1 gargoyle
  - 1 large blue dragon
- 4 double-sided dungeon map tiles (all different from 2004)
- 1 double-sided token sheet (for doors, chests, etc.)
- 4 character booklets
- 6 dice (one of each: black d4, red d6, orange d8, green d10, yellow d12, blue d20)
- 1 Dungeon Masters booklet
- 1 setup sheet (first encounter, which is also in the Advanced Rulebook)
- 1 Advanced Rulebook

Almost all of the content is different from the 2004 edition; only Regdar the Fighter made it into the 2006 edition. The sorcerer (Aramil) was replaced with a wizard (Lanin), and the young black dragon was replaced with a young blue dragon.

The Dungeon Master's book in the 2006 edition shows a purple percentile d10 die pictured, yet there was not one included in the box.

The tile sets are all different, as are the monsters and encounters. The 2004 set did not have the small token pieces (printed on thinner stock than the map tiles). While the 2004 edition included four extra monster miniatures, many of the miniatures included in the 2006 edition are larger (minotaur, gargoyle, harpie, and blue dragon) than most of the miniatures included in the earlier edition.

== 2007: Dungeons & Dragons Player's Kit ==
The Dungeons & Dragons Player's Kit is promoted as the sequel to the 2006 Basic game. It features a larger set of dice (1 d4, 4 d6, 1 d8, 2 d10, 1 d12, 1 d20 - all of which are a darker, marbled colored), an introduction to character creation booklet, a rules summary booklet, a solo adventure and a softcover version of the v.3.5 Player's Handbook. There is also included an Aberrations booster pack of eight random miniatures.
