= Deck of Magical Items =

- Genre: Role-playing games
- Publisher: TSR
- Publication date: 1993

Deck of Magical Items is an accessory for the 2nd edition of the Advanced Dungeons & Dragons fantasy role-playing game, published in 1993.

== Publication history ==
The deck was published by TSR.

== Contents ==
The deck contains 439 cards with magic items from the Dungeon Master's Guide and Tome of Magic.

== Reception ==
Keith H. Eisenbeis reviewed the accessory in issue No. 38 of White Wolf magazine. He noted that the deck's purpose was to provide a card with a magical item to a player when identified, but Eisenbeis noted various problems with the concept, including duplicate and nonstandard items. He concluded that the "cards represent some of the worst of the 'all flash but little substance' trend in gaming. Simply put, they are a gimmick, and an expensive one at $20.00". Eisenbeis gave the accessory an overall rating of a 1 out of a possible 5.
