= Of Ships and the Sea =

Of Ships and the Sea is a 1997 role-playing game supplement published by TSR for Advanced Dungeons & Dragons.

== Plot summary ==
Of Ships and the Sea is a rules supplement about ships, sailing, and naval combat, as well as underwater exploration.

== Reviews ==
- InQuest
- Backstab #7
