= Trail Map (Dungeons & Dragons) =

Trail Map series
- Genre: Role-playing game
- Publisher: TSR
- Publication date: 1989

The Trail Map series consists of several accessories for the Dungeons & Dragons fantasy role-playing game.

== Publication history ==
The TSR staff produced five Trail Map releases, each one published in 1989 as a very large color map (nearly 3' x 5') in an outer folder.

TM1 The Western Countries Trail Map detailed the travel routes found in the Western countries of the world of the Dungeons & Dragons series of Gazetteers, while TM2 The Eastern Countries Trail Map details the travel routes found in the Eastern countries of that world.

TM3 Krynn Trail Map detailed the travel routes found in the continent of Ansalon of the Dragonlance world.

TM4 Waterdeep Trail Map detailed the travel routes found near the city of Waterdeep, for the Forgotten Realms campaign setting.

TM5 Kara-Tur Trail Map detailed the travel routes found in the Kara-Tur area of the Forgotten Realms campaign setting.
