= Sages & Specialists =

Role-playing game supplement

- Genre: Role-playing games
- Publisher: TSR
- Publication date: 1996

Sages & Specialists is an accessory for the 2nd edition of the Advanced Dungeons & Dragons fantasy role-playing game, published in 1996.

== Contents ==
Sages & Specialists is a reference book for Dungeon Masters detailing 11 types of non-player character classes commonly found in a typical city.

== Publication history ==
Sages & Specialists was published by TSR, Inc. in 1996.

== Reception ==
Paul Pettengale reviewed Sages & Specialists for Arcane magazine, rating it a 6 out of 10 overall. While finding the concept sound, Pettengale doubted its practical usefulness, arguing that much of the content is "common sense" a referee would rarely consult and that character abilities should remain flexible.

Pierre Rosenthal covered the book for Casus Belli #100, giving a favorable review. He contrasted it with the limited class options of early AD&D and welcomed it as a supplement for lower-powered play, noting that each of the character classes came with its own level progression, THAC0, proficiencies, and trade-offs.
