= Dungeon Master's Kit =

Accessory for Dungeons & Dragons

- Author: James Wyatt, Jeremy Crawford
- Genre: Role-playing game
- Publisher: Wizards of the Coast
- Publication date: October 19, 2010
- Media type: Print (Trade Paperback)
- Pages: 272
- ISBN: 978-0-7869-5630-2

The Dungeon Master's Kit is a box set released as part of the Essentials line of the 4th edition of the Dungeons & Dragons role-playing game. It is intended for primary use by the game's Dungeon Master.

== Contents ==
This box set included:

- a "256-page book of rules and advice for Dungeon Masters"
- "two 32-page adventures" called the Reavers of Harkenwold
- "2 sheets of die-cut monster tokens"
- "2 double-sided battle maps"
- and a "fold-out Dungeon Master’s screen"

The book includes the updated Essentials rules and "advice to help Dungeon Masters run games for adventurers of levels 1–30".

== Publication history ==
On October 19, 2010, Dungeon Master's Kit was published and was written by James Wyatt and Jeremy Crawford. The box set was designed as the next step for Dungeon Masters after the Dungeons & Dragons Starter Set (2010) as part of the revamp of 4th edition. Greg Tito, for Escapist Magazine, wrote that Mike Mearls "intended the Essentials line – essentially a repackaging of 4E rules into easier-to-digest books – to get back to the shared language that unites all D&D players".

Shannon Appelcline, author of Designers & Dragons, wrote that "September and October 2010 saw the publication of the first four books of the Essentials line: Dungeons & Dragons Starter Set (2010), Rules Compendium (2010), Dungeon Master's Kit (2010), and the first players book, Heroes of the Fallen Lands (2010). Now, in November 2010, the set of six rules-oriented releases for Essentials was drawing to a close. The DM-oriented Monster Vault (2010) and the second players book, Heroes of the Forgotten Kingdom (2010), were both published on November 16".

On November 19, 2013, Dungeon Master's Kit was re-released as a PDF. This PDF only contains the original rulebook and the two adventure booklets.

== Reception ==
On the Essentials line, M.J. Harnish, for Wired, commented that "for the past few years, starting with the very announcement of 4E and the Virtual Tabletop debacle, Wizards has been very poor at communicating honestly and openly with its fan base and has put out a string of very sub-par or poorly supported products, many of which saw errata almost immediately after their release. [...] Confusing titles and formats (for example, the adoption of the digest-size books for the Essentials line and then subsequent abandonment of that format) didn't help the matter".

Critical-Hits strong dislike of the product led them to publish an editorial rather than a traditional review: "Here’s my beef with the product: taken alone as a product, this boxed set is extremely useful to new DMs, but as a product line, D&D Essential lost a lot of its new shine when I realized that this book reprinted, word for word, large swaths of text from the Rules Compendium and Heroes of Fallen Lands! [...] Please don’t get me wrong… I love the Essential line so far, especially the new PC builds, yet I fear that many customers like myself are going to have similar, negative reactions when they go through the books. [...] The D&D Essentials DM Kit is an excellent, high quality product for new DMs that graduate from the Red Box".

Kevin Kulp, game designer and admin of the independent D&D fansite ENWorld, commented that this "is the boxed set that many people wish that 4e D&D had started off with, instead of the actual DMG; it's a beautifully illustrated, clearly organized, rewritten guide to running 4e D&D. They got this one right. [...] I want to call out the superior art and layout design in this book. For new players in particular, being able to visualize and imagine the world they’re playing in is critical. The D&D Essentials line has taken this truism to heart. In every piece of art, from cartography to combat diagrams to the vibrant and action-filled illustrations, the magical tone and feel of the game comes through. Just looking at the book will give a browser an idea of what it feels like to play and run D&D, and that's a pretty impressive achievement".
