= Monster & Treasure Assortment =

Tabletop role-playing game supplement for Dungeons & Dragons

- Genre: Role-playing game
- Publisher: TSR
- Publication date: 1977

Monster & Treasure Assortment is an accessory for the Dungeons & Dragons fantasy role-playing game.

== Contents ==
The Monster & Treasure Assortment supplements provide lists of pre-generated monsters and treasures to populate dungeon levels with 100 sets for each level. Book One is for dungeon levels 1-3; Book Two is for dungeon levels 4-6; and Book Three is for dungeon levels 7-9.

== Publication history ==
Monster & Treasure Assortment Book One: Dungeon Levels One to Three was published by TSR in 1977 and featured a cover by David C. Sutherland III. Monster & Treasure Assortment Book Two: Dungeon Levels Four to Six was published by TSR in 1977 and featured a cover by Dave Trampier. Monster & Treasure Assortment Book Three: Dungeon Levels Seven to Nine was published by TSR in 1978 with a cover by Dave Trampier. All three of these sets contained 12 sheets.

These three sets were compiled in 1980, and published as the 32-page Monster & Treasure Assortment. This set contained 900 monsters—pre-rolled guardians of almost any type from stirges to type V demons—and 900 treasures of magic, money, and their containers. The lists are arranged in groups of 100, each group according to level, and each list allows for random generation to determine a room's contents.

== Reception ==
Elisabeth Barrington reviewed the 1980 compilation of Monster and Treasure Assortment in The Space Gamer #36 in 1981. While she felt that the lists would be of great use to the Dungeon Master for impromptu or random encounters, she went on to say, "Thirty-four pages of lists? And a lot of details are obscure - the DM has to create spells to go with magic items, and describe some monsters that aren't in the manual." Barrington could only recommend this product "to DMs who suffer from occasional or temporary mental blocks."
