= Heroes of the Elemental Chaos =

2012 role-playing game supplement

- Cover of the first edition
- Authors: Richard Baker, Robert J. Schwalb
- Language: English
- Subject: Role-playing games
- Genre: Dungeons & Dragons
- Publisher: Wizards of the Coast
- Publication date: February 2012
- Publication place: United States
- Media type: Print (Trade hardcover)
- Pages: 160
- ISBN: 978-0786959815

Heroes of the Elemental Chaos is a supplement to the 4th edition of the Dungeons & Dragons role-playing game. This book is one of three source books, along with Manual of the Planes (2008) and The Plane Below: Secrets of the Elemental Chaos (2009), from this era that details the Elemental Chaos from the 4th edition World Axis cosmology.

== Contents ==
This books "is the definitive sourcebook for creating and playing characters with ties to the Elemental Chaos and the primordial beings that dwell there. It shows how the elements can influence heroes of the natural world and presents elemental-themed character options for players".

The table of contents lists the follow sections:

- Chapter 1: Into the Maelstrom
  - Elemental Magic
  - Elemental Influence
  - The Elemental Chaos
  - Elemental-Touched Races
  - Gaining Elemental Power
  - The Primordials
  - Elemental Power in Your Game
- Chapter 2: Character Themes
- Chapter 3: Classes
  - Druid
  - Monk
  - Sorcerer
  - Warlock
  - Wizard
- Chapter 4: Elemental Options
  - Paragon Paths
  - Epic Destinies
  - Feats
  - Elemental Companions
  - Elemental Rewards
- Appendix: Character Advancement Table

== Publication history ==
In February 2012, Heroes of the Elemental Chaos was published by Wizards of the Coast. This was the third book in the Player's Option line for the 4th edition and it was written by Richard Baker and Robert J. Schwalb. It was re-released as a PDF on May 12, 2015.

Shannon Appelcline commented that with the eighth season of Encounters, The Elder Elemental Eye (2012, 11 weeks), "This Season continued its focus on the Player's Options books with tie-ins to Heroes of the Elemental Chaos (2012). Beyond that it's a cross-world saga that touches upon the Elder Elemental God, one of Gary Gygax's Greyhawk deities that he never quite got around to defining — despite mentions in the famous 'GDQ' series (1978–1980)."

== Reception ==
DieHard GameFan said that the book "does add a lot of new options for players of Fourth Edition. It’s a nice but flawed collection of new Themes, Subclasses and Paths. [...] If you feel like your 4e game is in need of something new to spice it up, Elemental Chaos is definitely a book that will do just that. It’s not for everyone and your specific mileage from the book may vary, but at the end of the day Heroes of the Elemental Chaos is almost all pure content rather that fluff or flavor, and that’s always a nice thing to see".
