= Monstrous Compendium =

Series of tabletop role-playing game supplements

- MC1, Monstrous Compendium, Volume One
- Publishers: TSR, Inc. Wizards of the Coast
- Publication: 1989; 37 years ago
- Years active: 1989–1998, 2022
- Genres: Role-playing game
- Languages: English
- Systems: AD&D 2nd Edition; D&D 5th Edition
- Chance: Dice rolling
- Media type: Game accessories

The Monstrous Compendium is a series of accessories for the Advanced Dungeons & Dragons fantasy role-playing game released from 1989 to 1998. The title was then used for a series of 5th Edition Dungeons & Dragons supplements released on D&D Beyond.

== Volumes ==
MC1 Monstrous Compendium, Volume One was published by TSR in 1989. It was written by the TSR staff, with a cover by Jeff Easley, and interior illustrations by Jim Holloway, and came boxed with 144 loose-leaf pages and eight color cardstock dividers (each with a color painting on it) in a three-ring binder. This supplement was presented as the base monster supplement intended to containing all the enemies required for most campaigns using 2nd edition AD&D rules. Each monster has both a description and an illustration on a page separate from the other monsters, allowing for easy removal and retention of alphabetical order when other monsters are added to it.

MC2 Monstrous Compendium, Volume Two was published by TSR in 1989. It was written by the TSR staff, with a cover by Jeff Easley and interior illustrations by Jim Holloway and Daniel Horne, and was published as 144 loose-leaf pages of more monsters, with eight color cardstock dividers.

MC3 Monstrous Compendium, Volume Three, Forgotten Realms Appendix was published by TSR in 1989. It was written by the TSR staff, with a cover by Jeff Easley, and was published as 64 loose-leaf pages and four color cardstock dividers. This was a supplement focusing on Forgotten Realms monsters.

MC4 Monstrous Compendium Dragonlance Appendix was published in 1989. It came boxed with 96 loose-leaf pages, 4 dividers and a 3-ring D-binder.

MC5 Monstrous Compendium Greyhawk Adventures Appendix was published in 1990. It had 64 pages and 4 dividers.

MC6 Monstrous Compendium, Kara-Tur Appendix was written by the TSR staff, with a cover by Jeff Easley, and was published by TSR in 1990 as 64 loose-leaf pages with four cardstock dividers. This was a supplement focusing on Kara-Tur monsters.

MC7 Monstrous Compendium Spelljammer Appendix was written by the TSR staff, with a cover by Jeff Easley, and was published by TSR in 1990 as 64 loose-leaf pages with four color cardstock dividers. This was a supplement focusing on Spelljammer monsters.

The cover of the Fiend Folio Appendix (1992)

Further volumes included the following:

- MC8 Monstrous Compendium Outer Planes Appendix (1991)—96 pages, 4 dividers
- MC9 Monstrous Compendium Spelljammer Appendix II (1991)—64 pages, 4 dividers
- MC10 Monstrous Compendium Ravenloft Appendix (1991)—64 pages, 4 dividers
- MC11 Monstrous Compendium Forgotten Realms Appendix II (1991)—64 pages, 4 dividers
- MC12 Monstrous Compendium Dark Sun Appendix: Terrors of the Desert (1992)—96 pages, 4 dividers
- MC13 Monstrous Compendium Al-Qadim Appendix (1992)—64 pages, 4 dividers
- MC14 Monstrous Compendium Fiend Folio Appendix (1992)—64 pages, 4 dividers
- MC15 Monstrous Compendium Ravenloft Appendix II: Children of the Night (1993)—64 pages, 4 dividers

== Annuals ==
- Monstrous Compendium Annual Volume One (1994)—reprints from modules and magazines of 1993
- Monstrous Compendium Annual Volume Two (1995)—reprints from modules and magazines of 1994
- Monstrous Compendium Annual Volume Three (1996)—reprints from modules and magazines of 1995
- Monstrous Compendium Annual Volume Four (1998)—96 pages; reprints from modules and magazines of 1996–7

== Campaign settings ==
The cover of the Dark Sun Appendix II: Terrors Beyond Tyr (1995)

- Mystara Monstrous Compendium Appendix (1994)
- Planescape Monstrous Compendium Appendix (1994)
- Planescape Monstrous Compendium Appendix II (1995)
- Planescape Monstrous Compendium Appendix III (1998)
- Ravenloft Monstrous Compendium Appendix III: Creatures of Darkness (1994)
- Ravenloft Monstrous Compendium Appendices I & II (1996)—reprinting MC10 & MC15
- Dark Sun Monstrous Compendium Appendix II: Terrors Beyond Tyr (1995)
- Savage Coast Monstrous Compendium Appendix (1996) (download-only)

== Dungeons & Dragons 5th edition ==
In 2022, Wizards of the Coast announced a new Monstrous Compendium series of 5th Edition supplements to be exclusively released on the online platform D&D Beyond; some of these supplements are available for free to registered users.

Title	Author(s)	Date	Notes
Monstrous Compendium Vol 1: Spelljammer Creatures	Christopher Perkins, Jeremy Crawford	April 21, 2022	Introduced ten creatures from the Spelljammer setting to the 5th Edition.
Monstrous Compendium Vol 2: Dragonlance Creatures	F. Wesley Schneider, Makenzie De Armas, Ron Lundeen, Jeremy Crawford	December 5, 2022	Introduced ten creatures from the Dragonlance campaign setting to the 5th Edition.
Monstrous Compendium Vol 3: Minecraft Creatures	Christopher Perkins	March 28, 2023	Introduced five creatures from the Minecraft video game to the 5th Edition to promote the Dungeons & Dragons DLC for Minecraft.
Monstrous Compendium Vol 4: Eldraine Creatures	James Wyatt, Jeremy Crawford, Ron Lundeen, Ben Petrisor	September 21, 2023	Features "creatures from Eldraine, the Magic: The Gathering plane recently featured in the Wilds of Eldraine set".

== Reception ==
Stephan Wieck reviewed Monster Compendium Volume One in White Wolf #17 (1989) and stated that "Of the three new 2nd Edition books, the monster compendium is the one that I feel improves the most over its predecessor."

Berin Kinsman reviewed Terrors of the Desert in the Mar–Apr 1993 issue of White Wolf. This 96-page manual was written by Tom Prusa, Louis J. Prosperi, Walter M. Bass, and Kira Glass and is "the first Monstrous Compendium appendix to deal with the AD&D Dark Sun setting". Kinsman stated that it was "an invaluable tool for Dungeon Masters running a game in this setting, and DMs who have included psionics in non-DARK SUN campaigns should look here for interesting challenges". He rated it overall at a 3 out of 5 possible points.

Rick Swan reviewed Ravenloft Monstrous Compendium Appendix II: Children of the Night for Dragon magazine #206 (June 1994). He commented on the proliferation of monster books from TSR and other publishers: "Role-players seem to have an insatiable appetite for monsters. The sound you hear is that of publishers scraping the bottom of the barrel for new ones." Swan noted that Children of the Night, by William W. Connors, adds living brains, bardic liches, and half-golems to the Ravenloft roster. Reviewing this with two other monster books from two other publishers, he quipped: "They're all interesting, but I bet if I read you the descriptions, you'd be hard-pressed to tell which monsters belonged to which system.

Trenton Webb reviewed Planescape Monstrous Compendium Appendix II for Arcane magazine, rating it an 8 out of 10 overall. He commented that the book "has a great cover and it's a top read too" and that the artwork "isn't exactly exactly inspired but it does sport a coherence and consistency rarely seen in roleplaying books. There are no 'well it's a man's head on a chicken's body' Crimewatch photofit embarrassments'" found in many other monster books. Webb noted that the text "goes out of its way to encourage adventurers to use this book as a foundation rather than a work of reference" and that most of the descriptions feature quotes to add flavor, "which normally involve the quotee being horribly killed". He felt that the blend and balance of the roughly 100 creatures in the book was good, "with a lively mix of the lawful and chaotic, the mighty and meek" but noted that the book "does err slightly in favour of the more fearsome, more powerful creatures".

Trenton Webb reviewed Monstrous Compendium Annual Two for Arcane magazine, rating it a 7 out of 10 overall. He comments: "Serious work goes into bringing the beasties to life, but the crippling list format means they limp rather than leap (or crawl, or slither, or fly for that matter) from the page. A fault this work compounds by further tweaking the experience points system. A factor that's made all the more frustrating when it becomes apparent that the Monstrous Annual 2 dangles some delightful creatures before the referee's eyes." Ramshaw appreciated one creature entry above all the others, naming the "star, without a shadow of a doubt" as the shambling umpleby: "Even without the Umpleby the Monstrous Annual 2 would be a necessary resource for all mainstream refs. With the shaggy-haired one, though, it rapidly approaches the essential."

Trenton Webb reviewed Ravenloft Monstrous Compendium Appendices I & II for Arcane magazine, rating it an 8 out of 10 overall. He noted that this product was a re-release of the first two Monstrous Compendium appendices for Ravenloft, in a single bound volume, and that Appendix I details "the variants, updates and unique monsters which lurk in the Demiplane's mists" while Appendix II "takes these new creatures and fleshes them out into full NPCs, expanding the descriptions in Appendix I". He commented that as a reference book, "Appendix I does its job well enough. The true worth of the work, though, undoubtedly comes from the quality of Appendix II's creations" which "offer referees a varied and rich source of legends to drop into their tavern conversations or to add colour to campaigns". Webb concluded his review by saying: "All Appendices I & II offer DMs who own the old loose leaf versions are a few new piccies and the tidy new bound form, which is all well and good but hardly enough to justify [the price]. But for Ravenloft DMs who've been struggling on without the compendiums, this re-issue is an essential purchase which offers both core reference material and an inspirational glimpse of the Demiplane's dark heart."

David Comford reviewed Monstrous Compendium Annual Volume Three for Arcane magazine, rating it a 4 out of 10 overall. He commented that "The strength of the annual is that the contents are drawn from a variety of AD&D settings. Creatures from the TSR magazines, Forgotten Realms, Birthright, Ravenloft, Dark Sun, Al-Quadim and Greyhawk can be found giving referees access to monsters with abilities that otherwise might not have been thought of." However, he questioned, "Are a few interesting ideas and cross-over scenarios worth over a tenner, though? Well, TSR has released such a stupefying amount of products to date that every referee should have a decent supply of challenging monsters available for them to use. If you don't, then have a flick through this for a few new ideas, but think twice before you buy it." Comford concluded his review by saying, "Volume three is a mixed bunch. Bar a few good entries it falls into a compilation of variations on a theme which, with a little time and imagination, most referees could come up with."

Alex Lucard, for Diehard GameFAN, highlighted the Spelljammer Monstrous Compendium MC7 on a list of 2nd Edition products he would want rereleased on DNDClassics. He commented that "I think the best Spelljammer piece to first put on DNDclassics.com would be with its first Monstrous Compendium. By taking a look at the wide range of creatures available to the setting, DMs would know if there was anything there to inspire them. [...] There are so many cool monsters in this book. [...] What veteran AD&D 2e gamer hasn’t at least heard of the most infamous race of creatures TSR ever put out? [...] I know, as teens, we all laughed at the concept of a tyrannohamsterus rex – until we had to fight one".

== See also ==
- List of Advanced Dungeons & Dragons 2nd edition monsters
- Monster Manual
