= Weapons of Legacy =

Dungeons & Dragons rulebook

- cover of Weapons of Legacy
- Author: Bruce R. Cordell, Kolja Raven Liquette, and Travis Stout
- Genre: Role-playing game
- Publisher: Wizards of the Coast
- Publication date: July 2005
- Media type: Print (Hardback)
- Pages: 224
- ISBN: 0-7869-3688-6
- OCLC: 61171314
- LC Class: GV1469.62.D84 D836 2000

Weapons of Legacy is a supplemental rulebook for the 3.5 edition of the Dungeons & Dragons role-playing game published by Wizards of the Coast.

== Contents ==
It introduces weapons that have histories and abilities matching their history, as well as rules governing such weapons in a campaign.

=== Legacy Weapons ===
Legacy weapons are unique weapons that have been forged or used by legendary beings and are themselves unique in regards to gameplay in that their magical abilities start out locked. Unlocking them requires some sort of sacrifice on the part of the wielder, in varying amounts, referred to as least legacy, lesser legacy, and greater legacy, in order from weakest to strongest.

The sacrifices required vary with each weapon, but they include some sort of permanent reduction in a player's abilities, i.e. loss of maximum hit points, permanent penalties to certain skills or abilities, etc. These penalties end when the wielder forswears the weapon.

If a wielder of a legacy weapon defeats the wielder of a different legacy weapon or artifact with it in combat, the winning legacy weapon inherits an ability from the defeated foe's legacy weapon/artifact.

=== Table of Contents ===
1. The Legacy: What are Legacy weapons, how do they affect your campaign, and why are they so unique?
2. Heroes of Legacy: This includes feats necessary to include legacy items into a campaign, as well as new spells and lore about legacy weapons.
3. Items of Legacy: This is a collection of sample legacy items, including their histories.
4. Founding Legacies: This provides information on how to create a legacy weapon in the campaign world.
5. Optional Rules: This discusses anything that was not covered in the previous four chapters and is not necessary to bring legacy weapons into a campaign. This chapter also includes NPCs with legacy weapons.

== Publication history ==
Weapons of Legacy was written by Bruce R. Cordell, Kolja Raven Liquette, and Travis Stout, and was published in July 2005. Cover art was by Henry Higginbotham, with interior art by Steven Belledin, Dennis Crabapple, Jeff Easley, Wayne England, Fred Hooper, Doug Kovacs, David Martin, Jim Nelson, William O'Connor, Michael Phillippi, Wayne Reynolds, Dan Scott, and Franz Vohwinkel.

Bruce Cordell explains how the book is all about "the stuff" - items that player characters can obtain: "Sure--this book is completely about the stuff. However, in developing an item of legacy's progression, an intimate knowledge of player character ability had to be kept in mind at all times. Because D&D characters are so concerned with their stuff, I'd say this book is as much about characters as any other player book, if not more so."
