= The Deck of Many Things =

5th Edition Dungeons and Dragons boxed set

- Rules required: Dungeons & Dragons, 5th edition
- First published: November 14, 2023
- ISBN: 9780786969173

The Deck of Many Things is a boxed set for the 5th edition of the Dungeons & Dragons fantasy role-playing game. The boxed set includes: The Book of Many Things (a sourcebook), The Deck of Many Things (a card deck with 66 cards), and The Deck of Many Things Card Reference Guide (guide booklet for the card deck). The items were published with a box to store deck and deck reference guide. Digitally, only The Book of Many Things is available.

== Publication history ==
The fictional magic item originated in the 1975 rules supplement Greyhawk. A physical card deck was published as an insert in the magazine Dragon in issue 148 (August 1989) and in Madness at Gardmore Abbey (2011).

== Reception ==
A review for Screen Rant praised the content as a way for a Dungeon Master to make a game unpredictable or give an existing game a different flavor, while having a more general appeal than Phandelver and Below: The Shattered Obelisk and Planescape: Adventures in the Multiverse. However, the reviewer believed that the set's price will limit how often it is used.

A review for Wargamer praised how the cards in the deck allow the Dungeon Master to generate content for games. However, it criticized the uneven quality of the story ideas and their repetition, as well as the confusing layout of the sourcebook.
