= Priest's Spell Compendium =

- Genre: Role-playing games
- Publisher: Wizards of the Coast

The Priest's Spell Compendium is a series of three volumes of accessories for the 2nd edition of the Advanced Dungeons & Dragons fantasy role-playing game.

== Contents ==
The Priest's Spell Compendium is a three-volume series which collects priest spells from previously published sources, and contains an alphabetical listing of spells.

Priest's Spell Compendium Volume Three is the last volume in the series, and contains spells from spike growth to zone of truth. The book includes an introduction and definitions of the spell schools in the game. It also includes Spell Appendices which cover spells ranging from the very powerful Quest spells to the far less powerful Orisons, and spells that deal with 8th to 10th level Psionic Enchantments adapted from the Dark Sun setting. The spells from the Sphere of War, which rely on the Battlesystem rules, appear in their own section.

== Publication history ==
Priest's Spell Compendium Volume Three was published by Wizards of the Coast, and developed and edited by Jon Pickens.

== Reception ==
Priest's Spell Compendium Volume Three was reviewed by the online version of Pyramid on February 18, 2000. The reviewer felt that this volume "wouldn't need a review" if it were merely the last volume in the series, but the appendices "make this a must have volume for anyone who ever wants to play a cleric or specialty priest".

== Reviews ==
- Envoyer (German) #35 (Vol 1)
- Envoyer (German) (Issue 45 - Jul 2000)
