= Tale of the Comet (boxed set) =

Tale of the Comet is a 1997 role-playing game supplement published by TSR for Advanced Dungeons & Dragons.

== Contents ==
Tale of the Comet is a supplement in which the player characters battle alien invaders and killer machines using both magic and advanced technology, eventually traveling from a frontier town to a distant high-tech world to help stop a galaxy-spanning war.

== Reviews ==
- Dragão Brasil #34
- Casus Belli #109
