= Dungeon Builder's Guidebook =

1998 role-playing game supplement published by TSR, Inc

Dungeon Builder's Guidebook is a 1998 role-playing game supplement published by TSR for Dungeons & Dragons

== Contents ==
Dungeon Builder's Guidebook is a supplement which provides assistance for designing dungeons.

== Reviews ==
- Backstab #11
- InQuest Gamer
