= Map Folio =

- Genre: Role-playing game
- Publisher: Wizards of the Coast
- Publication date: 2004
- Media type: Print
- ISBN: 0-7869-3134-5

The Map Folio series consists of three supplements to the 3.5 edition of the Dungeons & Dragons role-playing game.

== Contents ==
Map Folio I contains 32 full-color maps originally developed for the Map-a-Week feature on the official D&D website.

Map Folio II contains 32 all-new full-color maps.

Map Folio 3-D contains a small village of highly detailed card-stock buildings, walls, and other structures for assembly and use in any game. The buildings are scaled for use with Dungeons & Dragons Miniatures.

== Publication history ==
Map Folio I was illustrated by Todd Gamble and Robert Lazzaretti, and published in 2004. Map Folio II was illustrated by Todd Gamble, and published in 2004. Map Folio 3-D was designed by Dennis Kauth and Todd Gamble, and published in December 2004.

== Reception ==
- Pyramid - Map Folio 3-D
