= Player's Handbook 3 =

Supplement to 4th edition Dungeons & Dragons

Player's Handbook 3 is a supplement to the 4th edition of the Dungeons & Dragons role-playing game.

== Publication history ==
Player's Handbook 3, subtitled Psionic, Divine and Primal Heroes, was released on March 16, 2010. Retrieved on 2011-02-20. The book was designed by Mike Mearls, Bruce R. Cordell, and Robert J. Schwalb, and featured cover art by Michael Komarck and interior art by Ralph Beisner, Eric Belisle, Kerem Beyit, Wayne England, Jason A. Engle, Carl Frank, Randy Gallegos, Adam Gillespie, Ralph Horsley, Roberto Marchesi, Jake Masbruch, Jim Nelson, William O'Connor, Hector Ortiz, Shane Nitzche, Wayne Reynolds, Chris Seaman, John Stanko, Matias Tapia, Beth Trott, Francis Tsai, Eva Widermann, Sam Wood, Ben Wootten, and Kieran Yanner. It includes six classes: ardent, battlemind, monk, psion, runepriest, and seeker, along with four races: wilden, the minotaur, githzerai, and shardminds. The PHB3 also includes new multi-classing rules for hybrid characters.

== Reception ==
Player's Handbook 3 won the 2010 Silver ENnie Award for "Best Supplement".
