= Heroes of Shadow =

2011 role-playing game supplement

- The front cover of Heroes of Shadow, illustrated by Christopher Moeller
- Authors: Mike Mearls, Claudio Pozas, Robert J. Schwalb
- Genre: Role-playing game
- Publisher: Wizards of the Coast
- Publication date: April 19th, 2011
- Media type: Print
- Pages: 160
- ISBN: 978-0-7869-5745-3

Heroes of Shadow is a supplement to the 4th edition of the Dungeons & Dragons role-playing game. This was the first post-Essentials Dungeons & Dragons release and the supplement was designed to be compatible with both the Essentials line and the base game.

== Contents ==
Heroes of Shadow is a 160-page supplement focusing on shadow themed classes, races and other options for players.

Shannon Appelcline, author of Designers & Dragons, wrote: "Heroes of Shadow introduces a few classes who had been somewhat missing from D&D 4e. The assassin went MIA starting in AD&D second edition (1989-2000) [...]. It had returned in AD&D 3e (2000) as a prestige class, but wasn't in the core for 4e, appearing only in Dragon #379 (September 2009). [...] The blackguard is an alternate paladin that's sort of evil. The idea of an anti-paladin dates back to an article called "Good Got You Down? Try This for Evil" in Dragon #39 (July 1980). [...] However, anti-paladins had never before gotten official notice, and PHBR12: The Complete Paladin's Handbook (1994) even said 'we discourage the use of anti-paladins'. Now, Heroes of Shadow finally offered an official option".

The table of contents lists the follow sections:

- Chapter 1: Into the Dark
- Chapter 2: Shadow Class
  - Assassin
  - Paladin
  - Vampire
  - Warlock
  - Other Classes
- Chapter 3: Races of Shadow
  - Revenant
  - Shade
  - Vryloka
  - Dwarves
  - Eladrin
  - Elves
  - Halfings
  - Humans
- Chapter 4: Shadow Options
  - Paragon Paths
  - Epic Destines
  - Shadow Feat
  - Equipment

Appelcline also highlighted the three new races for 4th edition: "None of them were particularly notable in the annals of D&D, but each had a bit of historical depth. The revenant had previously appeared in Dragon #376 (June 2009). The shade was a popular D&D monster that dated back to Monster Manual II (1983). The vryloka was a breed of living vampires based on some of the same ideas as the vrykolaka from "Hearts of Darkness" in Dragon #126 (October 1990)".

== Publication history ==
On the development of this book, Senior Creative Art Director Jon Schindehette said the "Heroes of Shadows game supplement focuses on the darker characters in the Dungeons & Dragons universe. Now I’m not talking about villains, but rather those characters that call themselves heroes and use the power of the Shadowfell: dark, disturbed and perhaps even a little morally ambiguous at times, but heroes nonetheless".

Heroes of Shadow was written by Mike Mearls with Claudio Pozas and Robert J. Schwalb. It was published on April 19, 2011 and was the first post-Essentials Dungeons & Dragons. Appelcline added that "the whole Essentials line trailed off entirely in 2011. The 'Class Compendium,' which was intended to bridge the core 4E rules with the Essentials variant, was canceled. After that, Essentials-like books — starting with Heroes of Shadows (2011) — were returned to the more expensive hardcover format."

Appelcline commented that with the fifth season of Encounters, Dark Legacy of Evard (2011, 13 weeks), "This Season told a ghost story that focusing on the Shadowfell and the related Heroes of Shadow (2011) release." In May 2011, The Shadowfell: Gloomwrought and Beyond was released and continued to expand on the themes established in Heroes of Shadow.

On April 28, 2015, Heroes of Shadow was re-released as a PDF.

== Reception ==
Critical-Hits highlighted the fan confusion on if the book was part of the Essentials line or not: "If you were to ask me if the book Heroes of Shadow is an Essentials D&D product, I would say no on the principle that it does not say Essentials on the cover and that I have a pretty clear definition of what the product line was and entailed. However, I don’t feel that WotC has done a sufficient job making the definitions clear, and so I would say that this book very heavily favors Essentials content. [...] I think that what this book tells us about the direction for 4E D&D that WotC is taking is that new class design will be following the guidelines set forth in the Essentials products. New races, feats, items, and monsters all follow a new set of guidelines that came around mostly with Essentials, but I think the place we feel the difference the most, and the place where we really care, is in the design of classes".

Appelcline emphasized that vampires as a class, and not as a race, was the most controversial element of Heroes of Shadow. Appelcline pointed out that "the designers made this unusual choice because it allowed them to 'create a character that both captures the aspects of the iconic vampire, and feels like a vampire every round'. It also permitted players to mix various races with the vampire class. There was also a strong history of vampire classes in the D&D game, dating back to Dave Arneson's Blackmoor campaign".
