= Player's Option: Spells & Magic =

Dungeons & Dragons sourcebook

- Author: L. Richard Baker III
- Genre: Role-playing games
- Publisher: TSR
- Publication date: 1996-06-01
- Media type: Print (Hardcover)
- Pages: 192
- ISBN: 0786903945

Player's Option: Spells & Magic is an accessory for the 2nd edition of the Advanced Dungeons & Dragons fantasy role-playing game, published in 1996.

== Contents ==
Player's Option: Spells & Magic is a supplement which focuses in detail on magic. Spells & Magic is 192 pages in length, which includes an introduction, followed by eight chapters and four appendices. The introduction gives advice on how to integrate the material from the book into an ongoing campaign, and addresses factors such as the power, scarcity, and use of magic in storytelling.

The first two chapters discuss first wizards and then priests, beginning with the wizard schools and priest spheres of access with some small changes to the spell lists for each, then specialist classes (including some new classes), and closing the chapters with expansions to the customized rules for character classes in Player's Option: Skills & Powers. The third chapter examines other spellcasting classes, namely bards, rangers, and paladins, including optional abilities as well as limitations; the chapter also discusses multi-classed characters and monsters that use magic. The fourth chapter explores proficiencies, making a comparison between the standard system of proficiency slots and the character point rules found in Skills & Powers, before presenting new proficiencies for wizards and priests, and introduces "signature spells" which allow wizard characters to gain bonuses when casting a particular chosen spell. The fifth chapter deals with equipment for spellcasters, with rules for laboratories for wizards and altars for priests, examines the advantages and disadvantages of using rules for spell components in the game and includes rules on how to gather and purchase components, and ends with an examination of magic shops including both arcanists and apothecaries. The sixth chapter contains options for alternate magic systems, the seventh chapter includes expanded and revised rules on how to research new spells and create new magic items, and the last chapter presents new rules for how to handle spellcasting in combat. The first two appendices consist of new spells, and the last two appendices contain a full listing of wizard spells listed by school and priest spells listed by sphere.

== Publication history ==
Player's Option: Spells & Magic is the third and final book in the Player's Option rulebooks series for AD&D. It was published by TSR, Inc. in 1996.

== Reception ==
Andy Butcher reviewed Player's Option: Spells & Magic for Arcane magazine, rating it a 7 out of 10 overall. He felt that the chapter on alternate magic systems "contains the most ambitious and far-reaching options in the book". He adds that the rules "are compatible with the first Player's Option book, Combat & Tactics, and include a range of new tables and spells that allow for arms to be disintegrated, rib cages to be crushed and a range of other gruesome effects". He complains about the inclusion of "obligatory" new spells: "It seems that TSR still finds it impossible to release an AD&D supplement that concerns magic without throwing in at least 50 of these, nevertheless, some of those on offer are interesting (if somewhat potent). He commented on the revised spell lists: "Although most of the changes are fairly minor, they do go a long way towards making sense of these confusing aspects of the game." Butcher concluded of the book: "As the last book in the Player's Options series, Spells & Magic achieves what it sets out to do. It's the most in-depth look at every aspect of magic in AD&D so far, offers a host of optional and expanded rules for dealing with it in the game, and complements the other Player's Option books perfectly." Butcher goes on to say, "However, by offering a means for referees to customise the way magic works in the game, it also goes some way to solving the inherent limitations of AD&D. The magic system has always been cited as one of the key weaknesses of the rules by its detractors, and it has to be said that they have a point. The basic system models one particular style of magic (heavily inspired by Jack Vance's Dying Earth books), and this lack of flexibility has often been the cause of headaches for referees and players alike. The spell point system, though not perfect, does offer alternatives to the standard 'memorise and spell, and then forget it when you cast it' system, and is a welcome addition." Addressing some of the challenges with the book and the Player's Option series, he continues: "Player's Option: Spells & Magic is not without a couple of problems, though, both of which are related to the other books in the series. Firstly, although you don't actually need the other books, they're certainly very helpful and some sections of Spells & Magic are of little use without them. On a more general note, Spells & Magic shares the same downside as the entire series - by using the Player's Option books it's possible to completely customise your AD&D game, and overcome many of the limitations of the basic rules. However, doing so adds significantly to the complexity of the game". Butcher concludes his review by stating: "Still, there's no denying that both on its own and as the final part of the series, Spells & Magic is an interesting and useful book for any AD&D referee.

== Reviews ==
- Dragon #234
- Casus Belli #121
- Australian Realms #29
