= Vikings Campaign Sourcebook =

1991 role-playing game accessory by David Cook

- Author: David "Zeb" Cook
- Publisher: TSR
- Publication date: 1991

Vikings Campaign Sourcebook is an accessory for the Advanced Dungeons & Dragons fantasy role-playing game.

== Contents ==
This book begins with a brief chapter on Viking history and ends with chapters on Viking culture and geopolitics. The book introduces the concept of Gifts, special talents bestowed upon human characters by the Norns (Fates) at birth. If a player chooses to play a human character, he rolls on the Character Gifts Table, which gives him a chance that he will receive a permanent penalty or bonus. Vikings who aren't human are probably trollborn, a new racial type exclusive to this supplement. Trollborn are a repulsive combination of human and troll, with exceptional strength, constitution, and intelligence scores, but lower than average wisdom and charisma. They are denied Gifts but are endowed with infravision.

Cultural restrictions forbid the use of certain character classes. Specifically, Vikings can not be paladins, clerics, druids, or wizards. Fighters, rangers, thieves, bards, and specialist mages are allowed, with minor restrictions. To balance these restrictions, two new character classes are introduced. The first is the berserker, a hot-tempered warrior given to spontaneous bursts of rage. After working himself into a frenzy, the berserker gains bonuses to various attributes, which persist for a number of rounds and so long as the berserker directs his rage against a particular enemy. The second new class is the runecaster, a magic-wielding warrior with the ability to carve intricate runic designs on inanimate objects, imbuing them with a variety of powers. Additional fantasy elements include a selection of new magical items, and a chapter full of new monsters including the linnorm, the havmand, and the thursir.

== Publication history ==
The Vikings Campaign Sourcebook was published by TSR, Inc. as a 96-page softcover book, with a 28" × 19" map sheet. The book was designed by David Cook, with illustrations by Ned Dameron.

== Reception ==
Rick Swan reviewed Vikings Campaign Sourcebook for Dragon magazine #181 (May 1992). Swan considered the book more of an AD&D rules expansion than a campaign sourcebook; calling it "a user-friendly variant, easily digested by DMs and players alike. Though not quite the "new roleplaying experience" it aspires to be, there's plenty of interesting material to enliven an already existing campaign." He felt that the chapters on Viking history and on Viking culture and geopolitics "do little to integrate history and fantasy, together they serve as an informative overview from which the DM may develop his own setting". He noted that the introduction "promises help with adapting Viking culture to the Forgotten Realms, World of Greyhawk, and Dragonlance settings, but either I missed this section or it got lost somewhere along the way. Regardless, not much adaptation is required; Vikings as presented here could exist comfortably in just about any unexplored area on Krynn or Oerth without straining the players' credibility." He calls the trollborn "essentially humans with bad attitudes, a good choice for those with a flair for role-playing antisocial characters". He called the berserker and the runecaster classes "quite appealing and among the book's best features". He called the rune magic "an excellent addition to the AD&D magic rules and, ironically, much better realized than the rune system in the RuneQuest supplement" which was titled Vikings, reviewed in the same column. He bemoaned the lack of campaigning material in the book: "Sadly, there's no material comparable to the RuneQuest supplement's Scenarios Book. Adventure hooks suggest themselves in the chapter on Viking culture, but there are no specific outlines. To get a Viking campaign off the ground, the DM will have to rely on his own imagination, consult one of the reference books in the suggested reading list, or borrow ideas from another game supplement." Swan concluded his review with this evaluation: "Another chapter or two would've pushed this book over the top; notable by their absence are sections on Viking ships and sea travel, Norse mythology (we're referred instead to the 2nd Edition Legends and Lore book), and adventure design. The historical aspects are better presented than those in the RuneQuest supplement, but a game featuring trollborn and berserker warriors can't be taken seriously as a historical simulation. As a set of rule variants, however, it delivers the goods, particularly for AD&D game players who can't get enough new character classes and magic systems."
