= Mystara =

Dungeons & Dragons fictional campaign setting

- Designers: Lawrence Schick, Tom Moldvay, Dave Cook, Frank Mentzer, Bruce Heard, Aaron Allston, Ann Dupuis, et al.
- Publishers: TSR, Inc.; Wizards of the Coast
- Publication: 1981–1996
- Genres: Fantasy
- Systems: Dungeons & Dragons; Advanced Dungeons & Dragons 2nd Edition; D&D 3rd edition
- Chance: Dice rolling

Mystara is a campaign setting for the Dungeons & Dragons fantasy role-playing game. It was the default setting for the "Basic" version of the game throughout the 1980s and 1990s. Most adventures published for the "Basic" edition of D&D take place in "The Known World", a central continent that includes a varied patchwork of both human and non-human realms. The human realms are based on various real-world historical cultures. In addition, unlike other D&D settings, Mystara had ascended immortal beings instead of gods.

The Mystara planet also has sub-settings. The older Blackmoor setting was retconned to exist in Mystara's distant past. The Hollow World refers to the inner surface contained within the world of Mystara, similar to the real world legends of the Hollow Earth, while some adventures take place on the Savage Coast, a 2,000 mi (3,200 km)-long frontier coastline about 2,000 miles to the west of the Known World.

By the mid-1990s, gamers' attention started to shift towards the second edition of Advanced Dungeons & Dragons and its official campaigns. Some Mystara adventures for AD&D were published between 1994 and 1996. Eventually, official support of the Mystara setting was transitioned to the Official Fan Site system wherein the Vaults of Pandius fansite was selected to become the official site for the future 3rd edition of Mystara, and Wizards of the Coast support was discontinued by the time the game's third edition was released in 2000.

== Development ==
Mystara originated as a fantasy world developed by Lawrence Schick and Tom Moldvay for their own Dungeons & Dragons game sessions from 1974 to 1976. Their original setting consisted of a large continent with fictionalized nations that were based on real-world historical cultures. Inspired by author H. P. Lovecraft and his work in creating a fiction shared universe, Schick and Moldvay named their setting as the "Known World" so it could be expanded upon by other players. Schick then went to work at TSR Hobbies as a designer for D&D and other games. After being promoted to director of the Design Department he brought Moldvay in to join the company as a game designer, around the time when the D&D Expert Set was under development. After being told that they could not use the existing Greyhawk setting, as it was being reserved for only Advanced Dungeons & Dragons products, Schick and Moldvay got approval to instead use their "Known World" as the standard D&D campaign setting.

Schick and Moldvay's "Known World" was used as a semi-generic setting in early adventure modules, first mentioned in Module X1, The Isle of Dread. It was then expanded upon in various D&D modules and sources, particularly a series of Gazetteers, many of which originally referred to the setting as "The D&D Game World". The first published use of the name "Mystara" came in 1991 from Bruce Heard in the Letters section of his Voyage of the Princess Ark series in Dragon magazine. While the name was used in official publications after this, it was not until the conversion to AD&D 2nd Edition in 1994 that products were produced under the Mystara title with the official Mystara logo.

Each part of the D&D Gazetteer series treats one nation or empire and has three basic elements: cultural and geographic background, features, and adventures. The cultural and geographic campaign background section offers a brief history and timeline for each nation; basic geography, climate, and ecology; and, fundamental social and political concepts of the region. Each Gazetteer also offers a list of scenario ideas appropriate to the campaign setting.

Trenton Webb for the British Arcane RPG magazine described Mystara as "a traditional Tolkienesque world".

== Planet of Mystara ==
Three principal land masses are described on Mystara's outer surface: the continent of Brun, the continent of Skothar, the continent of Davania, and the island continent of Alphatia (up to AC 1010). In the officially published material, the Known World concentrated on the eastern portion of Brun and the lands of the Sea of Dawn. The continents of Mystara were designed to be similar in appearance to the continents of Laurasia and Gondwana on Earth approximately 135 million years ago.

In addition to human races, several archetypal fantasy races were included on Mystara: these include elves, dwarves, halflings, orcs, and dragons.

Nations created for the world of Mystara include the Thyatian Empire, the Grand Duchy of Karameikos, the Principalities of Glantri, the merchant-run Republic of Darokin, the Emirates of Ylaruam, the Dwarven nation of Rockhome, the Elven Kingdom of Alfheim, Halfling lands of the Five Shires, and the chaotic Alphatian Empire.

=== The continent of Brun ===
The most commonly known land mass on Mystara's outer surface is only a tiny portion of Brun. In the officially published material, the Known World concentrated on the eastern portion of Brun along with the islands of the Sea of Dawn.

==== The Known World ====
Nations of the Known World display a great range of government types. Some countries are populated entirely by demihumans and/or humanoids. By standard convention, the boundaries of the "Known World" are those covered in the world map as initially published in the module X1, "The Isle of Dread," plus Norwold, the Isle of Dawn, and (pre Wrath of the Immortals) Alphatia.

As the name implies, the "Known World" covers the most notable nations of Mystara, the ones most commonly used in Mystara-based campaigns and featured in fiction. It includes the Thyatian Empire, which could be compared to the Byzantine Empire; the Grand Duchy of Karameikos (which includes the town of Threshold, the default setting of many classic D&D adventures); the Principalities of Glantri, ruled by wizard-princes; the Ethengar Khanate, a Mongol-like society; the merchant-run Republic of Darokin, which is based loosely on the mercantile states of medieval Italy; the Emirates of Ylaruam; the Heldannic Territories, ruled by an order of religious knights similar to the Teutonic Order devoted to the Immortal Vanya; the Atruaghin Clans, which have an Amerindian feel; the nation of Sind, based on the Mughal Empire; the Northern Reaches Kingdoms of Ostland, Vestland, and the Soderfjord Jarldoms, based on Scandinavia at various periods of history; the Dwarven nation of Rockhome; the elven Kingdom of Alfheim; the Halfling lands of the Five Shires; and the Alphatian Empire, ruled by wizards and other spellcasters.

To the distant Northwest of the "Known World", across the Great Waste, lies the mysterious lands of Hule, ruled by Hosadus, also known as "The Master". Also on the periphery of the Known World are the Kingdoms of Wendar and Denagoth, the first an elven-dominated nation and the latter a mountainous and dark realm of evil, with ill-intentions towards Wendar. The Adri Varma lies between Sind, Wendar, the Great Waste, and The Black Mountains, forming the northern border of Glantri and defining the northwestern limits of the region.

==== The Savage Coast ====
Mystara includes the Savage Coast, a coastal area located in the south-central part of the Brun continent, to the south and west of Hule. The area is a 2000-mile frontier coastline about 2000 miles west of the Known World.

This part of Mystara is affected by the Red Curse. This sinister enchantment eventually kills its inhabitants through mutation unless the (fictional) metal cinnabryl is worn in contact with the body. The specifics of the "Red Curse" include mutilation of the body and extreme degeneration of physical and mental health. It also imprisons the region's inhabitants, as debilitating effects result if they leave the cursed area.

===== Atmosphere =====
Savage Coast's swashbuckling flavor is very different from that of the Known World, closer in atmosphere to that of the Age of Discovery than the fantasy middle-ages/renaissance tone of the Known World. The Savage Coast is complete with gunpowder ("smokepowder") weaponry.

===== Publication history =====
The first published information on the area was the module X9 The Savage Coast for Dungeons & Dragons Expert Set. The region was later expanded in Dungeon magazine issues #6 and 7 (1987) with the adventure "Tortles of the Purple Sage".

Two series in Dragon Magazine, "The Princess Ark" and the "Known World Grimoire", described the Savage Coast in more detail. These articles were partially reprinted in the D&D game accessory Champions of Mystara (1993).

The Savage Coast in 1994 was spun off into a campaign setting for Advanced Dungeons & Dragons (2nd Edition). This area was published in its own boxed set entitled Red Steel, and later republished online as the Savage Coast. An expansion, Savage Baronies, was released the following year. These supplements were for Advanced Dungeons & Dragons 2nd edition, as all the previous material had been for the "Classic" version of D&D.

In 1996, the setting was revised and re-released under the AD&D: Odyssey line as three fully online products available for free download. This range included the base Savage Coast Campaign Book by Tim Beach and Bruce Heard, a supplement Savage Coast: Orc's Head, and a Monstrous Compendium Appendix.

=== The continent of Davania ===
Even though most of the Known World civilizations historically originated from this part of the planet, it did not see much development while the Mystara product line was still in production. The only major appearance of the continent was in Dragon magazine, where parts of it were sketched out during the Voyage of the Princess Ark series, by Known World Product Manager Bruce Heard.

Many Mystara fans have been turning their attention to Davania with fan-made material in recent years.

=== The continent of Skothar ===
Very little was officially developed for this part of Mystara. Since the Mystara product line was discontinued, fans have created their material for this part of Mystara.

== The Hollow World ==
Mystara is a hollow planet, with a habitable surface on its interior called the Hollow World, inspired by conceptions like that novelized by Jules Verne. This world is lit by an eternal red sun at the center of Mystara, and serves as a "cultural museum", preserving the societies that have become extinct in the outer world, "based on Native American, Aztec, Viking, and ancient Rome. The existence of the Hollow World is not, in general, known to the inhabitants of the outer world. The poles are actually huge, subtly curving holes that allow passage between the outer and inner world, although it is a long, hard trek through a cold, unlit, stormy and anti-magic area. The curvature of the holes is so subtle that explorers from either surface do not notice the transition until after it is already made, causing quite a shock for most.

== Moons ==
Two moons orbit the planet. Matera is a moon much like our own, whose phases govern lycanthropy (werewolves, werebears, etc.). Only the Immortals inhabit Matera. They live in a city, Pandius, where they can meet and watch over Mystara. Patera, or Myoshima to its inhabitants, is an invisible moon that cannot be seen from Mystara. Patera's inhabitants have a culture similar to that of medieval Japan.

== Blackmoor ==
Mystara (like Greyhawk) incorporated the Blackmoor setting by placing it in the world's distant past. Blackmoor evolved from a feudal kingdom into a highly advanced civilization, using more and more powerful – and destructive – technology. It ended itself in an apocalyptic explosion so devastating that it changed the climate and geography of the entire planet.

== Mystara video games ==
Mystara video games
1992	D&D: Order of the Griffon
1992	D&D: Warriors of the Eternal Sun
1993	Fantasy Empires
1994	D&D: Tower of Doom
1995
1996	D&D: Shadow over Mystara

Five video games were set in Mystara, spanning three different genres. Dungeons & Dragons: Order of the Griffon (TurboGrafx-16, 1992) and Dungeons & Dragons: Warriors of the Eternal Sun (Sega Genesis, 1992) are role-playing video games. Fantasy Empires (PC, 1993) is a strategy game. The plots and development teams of these games are unrelated.

Dungeons & Dragons: Tower of Doom (1994) and its sequel Dungeons & Dragons: Shadow over Mystara (1996) are two arcade beat 'em up with minimal role-playing elements. These two games are among the few D&D video games developed by a Japanese company, in this case by Capcom.

== Novels ==
- Timothy Brown (October 1995), Dark Knight of Karameikos (ISBN 0-7869-0307-4)
- Morris Simon (August 1996), The Black Vessel (ISBN 0-7869-0507-7)

=== First Quest ===
- J. Robert King (February 1995), Rogues to Riches (ISBN 1-56076-825-8)
- Dixie Lee McKeone (May 1995), Son of Dawn (ISBN 1-56076-884-3)
- Elaine Cunningham (1995), The Unicorn Hunt

=== Dragonlord Chronicles ===
- Thorarinn Gunnarsson (July 1994), Dragonlord of Mystara (ISBN 1-56076-906-8)
- Thorarinn Gunnarsson (July 1995), Dragonking of Mystara (ISBN 0-7869-0153-5)
- Thorarinn Gunnarsson (April 1996), Dragonmage of Mystara (ISBN 0-7869-0488-7)

=== Penhaligon Trilogy ===
- D. J. Heinrich (October 1992), The Tainted Sword (ISBN 1-56076-395-7)
- D. J. Heinrich (April 1993), The Dragon's Tomb (ISBN 1-56076-592-5)
- D. J. Heinrich (October 1993), The Fall of Magic (ISBN 1-56076-663-8)

== Source material ==
=== Dungeons & Dragons BECMI rules ===
These rulebooks are designed for the BECMI edition of Basic D&D by Frank Mentzer.

Code	Title	Levels	Author(s)	Published	Notes
1011	Basic Set (Note: Previous 'boxset' versions by John Eric Holmes (in 1977), and later by David 'Zeb' Cook (in 1981) were in a generic 'Known World' setting.)	1–3	Frank Mentzer	1983	Introduced the player character (PC) basic adventurer process. Module B2, The Keep on the Borderlands, had previously been included and would later be set in the Atlan Tepe Mountain region of Northern Karameikos.
1012	Expert Rules	4–14	Frank Mentzer	1983	The first of several expansions, it described the player character (PC) expert adventurer's progression process. Since 1981, the module X1 The Isle of Dread was included in the set as an example of an outdoor adventure in the Known World that became the Mystara setting.
1013	Companion Rules	15–25	Frank Mentzer	1984	The Companion Rules further expanded what the PCs could do as they became rulers and influential adventurers. The Dungeon Master's Companion book contains three mini-scenarios set explicitly in Mystara. It introduced the "War Machine" mechanics for large-scale battles in high level campaigns.
1021	Master Rules	26–36	Frank Mentzer	1985	The Master Rules expansion explored how the PCs could run small empires and have an impact upon the Mystaran campaign setting. It also outlined how to progress even further.
1017	Immortal Rules	36+	Frank Mentzer	1986	The expansion in the Immortals Rules provided a guide for PCs that had transcended normal adventurer dynamics and would now advance in ranks as they explored the multiverse system. Notes and sample plots for Immortal adventures and campaigns were provided, including duties and responsibilities related to the PCs' new status in the Mystara setting.
1071	Rules Cyclopedia	1–36	Aaron Allston	1991	Combined the first four of the BECMI boxsets as a single hardcover book. Includes an appendix briefly describing the Mystara/Hollow World Gazetteers (AC1000). Includes an updated conversion to AD&D 2nd Edition previously published in 1989's Dawn of the Emperors.

=== Notable adventure modules ===
Code	Title	Levels	Author(s)	Published	Notes
X1	The Isle of Dread	3–7	David Cook; Tom Moldvay	1981	Introduces the Known World, the most notable nations of Mystara, and the Sea of Dread and the Thanegioth Archipelago to the south.
X4	Master of the Desert Nomads	6–9	David Cook	1983	Expands the world to the west with the introduction of the Sind Desert and the Great Waste.
X5	Temple of Death	6–10	David Cook	1983	Introduces the land of Hule, further expanding the world to the west.
X6	Quagmire!	4–10	Merle M. Rasmussen	1984	First adventure in the Serpent Peninsula, south of Sind.
X9	The Savage Coast	4–10	Merle M. Rasmussen; Jackie Rasmussen; Anne C. Gray	1985	Introduces the Savage Coast, southwest of Hule.
X10	Red Arrow, Black Shield	10–14	Michael S. Dobson	1985	The politics of the most notable nations and areas of the Known World are further expanded in this adventure.
X11	Saga of the Shadow Lord	5–9	Stephen Bourne	1986	Introduces the Kingdoms of Wendar and Denagoth, north of the most notable nations.
CM1	Test of the Warlords	15+	Douglas Niles	1984	First major adventure in the land of Norwold, northeast of the most notable nations.
M5	Talons of Night	20–25	Jennell Jaquays (Note: Credited as Paul Jaquays.)	1987	Adventure in the Isle of Dawn, within the Alphatian Empire.

=== Dungeons & Dragons Gazetteers ===
Code	Title	Author(s)	Published	Notes
GAZ1	The Grand Duchy of Karameikos	Aaron Allston	1987	
GAZ2	The Emirates of Ylaruam	Ken Rolston	1987	
GAZ3	The Principalities of Glantri	Bruce Heard	1987	
GAZ4	The Kingdom of Ierendi	Anne Gray McCready	1987	
GAZ5	The Elves of Alfheim	Steve Perrin	1988	
GAZ6	The Dwarves of Rockhome	Aaron Allston	1988	
GAZ7	The Northern Reaches	Ken Rolston	1988	
GAZ8	The Five Shires	Ed Greenwood	1988	
GAZ9	The Minrothad Guilds	Deborah Christian; Kim Eastland	1988	
GAZ10	The Orcs of Thar	Bruce Heard	1988	Includes Orc Wars boardgame.
GAZ11	The Republic of Darokin	Scott Haring; William W. Connors	1989	
GAZ12	The Golden Khan of Ethengar	Jim Bambra	1989	
1037	Dawn of the Emperors: Thyatis and Alphatia	Aaron Allston	1989	Boxed set; includes AD&D 2nd Edition conversion.
GAZ13	The Shadow Elves	Carl Sargent; Gary Thomas	1990	
GAZ14	The Atruaghin Clans	William W. Connors	1991	
1082	Wrath of the Immortals	Aaron Allston	1992	The Codex of the Immortals rulebook includes a chapter describing all the immortal NPCs in Mystara. The Immortals' Fury campaign adventure saga is set in Mystara. It also advanced the timeline to AC1010 and included an update to the previous Immortal rules.
1094	Champions of Mystara: Heroes of the Princess Ark	Ann Dupuis; Bruce Heard	1993	A summation of Princess Ark adventures from Dragon (magazine) that further explored the Hollow World, Mystara, and both her moons. It also explained how to connect with the Spelljammer setting, thus the ability to explore the various AD&D settings.

=== Dungeons & Dragons Trail Maps ===
Code	Title	Author(s)	Published	Notes
TM1	Western Countries Trail Map		1989	
TM2	Eastern Countries Trail Map		1989	

=== Dungeons & Dragons Creature Crucible ===
Code	Title	Author(s)	Published	Notes
PC1	Tall Tales of the Wee Folk	John Nephew	1989	
PC2	Top Ballista	Carl Sargent	1989	
PC3	The Sea People	Jim Bambra	1990	
PC4	Night Howlers	Ann Dupuis	1992	Adaptable to AD&D 2nd Edition.

=== Dungeons & Dragons Hollow World ===
Code	Title	Author(s)	Published	Notes
1054	Hollow World Campaign Set	Aaron Allston	1990	Boxed Set
HWR1	Sons of Azca	John Nephew	1991	Accessory
HWR2	Kingdom of Nithia	Blake Mobley, Newton Ewell	1991	Accessory
HWR3	The Milenian Empire	Anthony Herring	1992	Accessory
HWA1	Nightwail	Allen Varney	1990	Adventure
HWA2	Nightrage	Allen Varney	1990	Adventure
HWA3	Nightstorm	Allen Varney	1991	Adventure
HWQ1	The Milenian Scepter	Anthony Herring	1992	Adventure

=== Advanced Dungeons & Dragons Mystara ===
Code	Title	Author(s)	Published	Notes
TSR 2500	Karameikos: Kingdom of Adventure	Jeff Grubb, Aaron Allston, Thomas M. Reid	1994	Boxed Set
TSR 2511	Glantri: Kingdom of Magic	Monte Cook, Bruce A. Heard	1995	Boxed Set
TSR 2502	Hail the Heroes	Tim Beach	1994	Adventure Boxed Set
TSR 2509	Night of the Vampire	L. Richard Baker III	1994	Adventure Boxed Set
TSR 2513	Mark of Amber	Aaron Allston, Jeff Grubb and John D. Rateliff	1995	Adventure Boxed Set
TSR 2510	Player's Survival Kit	John D. Rateliff	1995	Accessory
TSR 2512	Dungeon Master Survival Kit	Steven Schend	1995	Accessory
TSR 2506	Poor Wizard's Almanac III & Books of Facts	Ann Dupuis	1994	Accessory
TSR 2517	Joshuan's Almanac & Book of Facts	Ann Dupuis, Elizabeth Tornabene	1995	Accessory
TSR 2501	Monstrous Compendium Appendix Mystara	John Nephew, John Terra, Skip Williams, Teeuwynn Woodruff	1994	Accessory

=== Advanced Dungeons & Dragons Red Steel ===
Code	Title	Author(s)	Published	Notes
TSR 2504	Red Steel Campaign Expansion	Tim Beach	1994	Accessory & Boxed Set
TSR 9500	Savage Baronies	Tim Beach	1995	Accessory & Adventure

=== Advanced Dungeons & Dragons Odyssey: Savage Coast ===
Code	Title	Author(s)	Published	Notes
TSR 2521	Savage Coast Campaign Book	Tim Beach, Bruce Heard	1996	Accessory
TSR 2522	Savage Coast Orc's Head Peninsula Sourcebook	Nicky Rea	1996	Accessory
TSR 2524	Savage Coast Monstrous Compendium Appendix	Loren L. Coleman, Ted James, Thomas Zuvich	1996	Accessory
