= The Principalities of Glantri =

Tabletop role-playing game supplement for Dungeons & Dragons

- Author: Bruce Heard
- Genre: Role-playing game
- Publisher: TSR
- Publication date: 1987
- Pages: 96

The Principalities of Glantri (product code GAZ3) is an accessory for the Basic Set edition of the Dungeons & Dragons fantasy role-playing game. It is part of the Gazetteer series of supplements for the Mystara campaign setting.

== Contents ==
The Principalities of Glantri details Glantri, a land of magicians. The book includes sections on living in the city and what it is like at night.

The Gazetteer describes the nation's cultural and geographic background, adventures for Glantri, and its special features, including the fantasy city of Glantri City and variant magic systems. The nation's economy is explicitly developed in accordance with the dominion rules from the D&D Companion Set, and the nation's armed forces are also described in War Machine terms (the D&D Companion Set's mass-combat system). The origins, objectives, and main personalities of each aristocratic house and clan struggling for control of Glantri's Council of Princes are described, along with the number of votes it controls in the council. The book presents the city's assortment of guilds and brotherhoods, such as Beggar's Court, the Elven Liberation Front, the Free Fundamentalist Farmers, the Monster Handler's Syndicate, and the Thousand Fists of Khan, each with conflicting interests and political machinations. The Gazetteer offers an elaborate view of the magic-user's career, focusing on enrollment in the Glantrian School of Magic, which permits a magic-user character to learn new skills, like quick spell-casting and the ability to combine spells. The Gazetteer also provides player character (PC) spell-casting specialties: The Seven Secret Orders of the Great School of Magic are the Alchemists, Dracologists, Elementalists, Illusionists, Necromancers, Cryptomancers (runemasters), and Witches.

Also provided are twenty suggested scenario ideas tied to distinctive features of the Glantrian campaign, including a four-page "graduation test"—a complete dungeon adventure designed to test magic-users hoping to graduate from the Great School of Magic. The 22" x 34" map is printed in color on both sides; one side is a political/terrain hex map of Glantri, with insets of two villages and an army camp, while the reverse is a map of Glantri City and its waterways. The map keys and building labels are not on the maps, so they can be shared with the players.

== Publication history ==
GAZ3 The Principalities of Glantri was written by Bruce Heard, with a cover by Clyde Caldwell and interior illustrations by Stephen Fabian, and was published by TSR in 1987 as a ninety-six page booklet with a large color map and an outer folder. Karen Martin and Aaron Allston edited the book, and the graphic design and cartography was done by Dave Sutherland, Dennis Kauth, and Ron Kauth. While working for TSR, Heard arranged a freelance arrangement with them to write the Gazetteer, requesting to do a ninety-six page project because he felt that sixty-four pages would not be enough to detail the setting.

The Principalities of Glantri was the third in a series of Gazetteer books, each of which treats one nation or empire of the D&D game's Known World; it was preceded by GAZ1 The Grand Duchy of Karameikos and GAZ2 The Emirates of Ylaruam.

== Reception ==
Ken Rolston reviewed The Principalities of Glantri for Dragon magazine #129 (January 1988). Rolston called Glantri "Quite an unusual D&D game setting", as it is a nation run by an aristocracy of magic-users, numbered among them disguised lycanthropes, vampires, necromancers, liches, and Immortals; and "a nation where religion is prohibited, and where being a cleric is a capital offense". Rolston commented that "Glantri City is the best-developed AD&D or D&D game city" he had seen, with the exception of Lankhmar as presented in TSR's Lankhmar: City of Adventure, noting that his favorite part is the similarity to Venice: "Glantri City has canals rather than streets, and travel is by bridge, gondola, or private boat". He also felt that the setting was visually "one of the nicest things from TSR in a long time", with its color map and the interior illustrations by Stephen Fabian, which Rolston called "strikingly ornamented and full of character". He concluded that "The Principalities of Glantri is well-written, nicely presented, and full of nifty and original suggestions for running a campaign in a land ruled by magic-users. There are plenty of ideas, tones, and themes to choose from, with a refreshingly flexible and spontaneous attitude toward introducing new rules and offbeat ideas." Rolston felt that the source of its greatest strengths was the focus on magic-users, although he ceded that dungeon masters (DMs) may hesitate to run a campaign in a setting where clerics are illegal but can be played covertly. He also felt that most of the ideas, characters, and settings could be used for the AD&D game, and that "no AD&D game supplement offers such a rich development of the role of the magic-user".
