= Dungeons & Dragons: Order of the Griffon =

1992 video game

Order of the Griffon
- Cover art: "Spellfire" by Clyde Caldwell
- Developer: Westwood Associates
- Publishers: Turbo Technologies; Strategic Simulations, Inc.
- Designer: Joseph B. Hewitt IV
- Composer: Frank Klepacki
- Platform: TurboGrafx-16
- Release: NA: October 20, 1992
- Genre: Tactical role-playing game
- Mode: Single-player

Order of the Griffon is a tactical role-playing game for the TurboGrafx-16 developed by Westwood Associates and based on the tabletop role-playing game Dungeons & Dragons (D&D). The game is set in the nation of Karameikos within D&D's Mystara setting.

== Gameplay ==
Order of the Griffon uses a turn-based combat engine similar to that of the Gold Box games, such as Pool of Radiance. Unlike many Gold Box games, however, Order of the Griffon utilizes the D&D BECMI rules instead of the AD&D rules. Players select four pre-generated characters from the following classes: fighter, dwarf, mage, thief, halfling, cleric, and elf. Although characters are pre-generated, the player is offered three character options per class, each with different strengths and weaknesses. Characters start at the 1st level of experience and can achieve a maximum of 8th level. Order of the Griffon uses a first-person perspective similar to Eye of the Beholder in cities and dungeons, and a bird's eye view for both the overland map and combat encounters.

The game also includes a number of powerful magic items. The Four Stones (ruby, onyx, death gem, and diamond) imbue the user with the ability to transform living victims into the undead. The Staff of Life allows access into Koriszegy Crypt. The Chalice is able to neutralize the poison that nearly kills Duke Stefan. The Staff of Halav is the only item that can kill the Vampire Koriszegy.

== Plot ==
Lord Korrigan, the ruler of Radlebb Keep, commissions the party of adventurers to investigate strange rumors of vampires, lycanthropes, and undead roaming the lands. Shortly thereafter the party uncovers assassination plots against Karameikan leaders, a conspiracy between various factions to turn innocent people into undead, and foretellings of the return of an ancient vampire.

The party's travels take them to three cities (Specularum, Radlebb Keep, and Kelvin) as well as to various ruined sites, keeps, caves, and forests as they attempt to recover the four stones (ruby, onyx, death gem, and diamond) and prevent the evil Vampire Koriszegy from amassing an army of the dead. The game culminates in a final showdown with the evil vampire himself.

The game includes competing factions and organizations. The Order of the Griffon is an honorable society of paladins, knights, and fighters with branches throughout Karameikos. The Iron Ring is a powerful criminal organization composed of bandits, cut-throats, and lycanthropes hired by the vampire Korizsegy to carry out many of his evil schemes, including assassinations and kidnappings of important political leaders. Its main branch is hidden deep within the Karameikan forests. An evil wolf pack is hired by Koriszegy and led by the sentient dire wolf, Collum, who was to give the Staff of Life to the Iron Ring after the latter had eliminated the rival Dosmo pack. The party joins the Order of the Griffon after successfully defeating Collum and retrieving the Staff of Life.

== Reception ==
Andrew Schultz from Honest Gamers writes of the game: "OotG is unambitious and still hardly perfect, and it does best when it breaks away from the AD&D formula and just tries to dazzle you. There's no doubt Dungeons and Dragons was influential in some of the early RPG's. By the time it got to computers, however, other people had taken the concept in far different directions, and the basics plus a flabby plot weren't enough any more".

== See also ==
- Dungeons & Dragons: Warriors of the Eternal Sun - also developed by Westwood Associates for Sega Genesis
