= The Golden Khan of Ethengar =

Tabletop role-playing game supplement for Dungeons & Dragons

- Cover art by Clyde Caldwell
- Author: Jim Bambra
- Illustrator: Clyde Caldwell; Stephen Fabian
- Genre: Fantasy Role-playing game
- Publisher: TSR
- Publication date: December 1989

The Golden Khan of Ethengar (product code GAZ12) is an supplement published by TSR in 1989 for the fantasy role-playing game Dungeons & Dragons.

== Contents ==
The Golden Khan of Ethengar is a set of two booklets that detail the plains of Ethengar within the campaign world of Mystara, and the eight tribes that live there, who are described by Lawrence Schick as resembling "the Mongols at the time of Kublai Khan".

The product contains two booklets within a cover folder:

- The 32-page "Player's Guide" provides an overview of the land, and includes rules for Ethengar player characters and a shaman character class. Descriptions of customs, appearance, equipment, law, and religion are also included.
- The 64-page "Dungeon Master's Guide" contains background information on the history, politics, and leaders of the tribes, including the Golden Khan himself and his court. An annual calendar is closely examined, since festivals play an important role. The gazetteer also details the geography of the steppes, the humanoids and other creatures that live there, and adventure scenario suggestions, as well as rules for adapting the material to Advanced Dungeons & Dragons.

A large color map of the region is included.

== Publication history ==
In an attempt to broaden the popularity of D&D's Mystara campaign setting, TSR published a series of 14 gazetteers between 1987 and 1991, each focused on a different region. The twelfth, released in 1989, was GAZ12 The Golden Khan of Ethengar; it contained two booklets written by Jim Bambra, a large color map and an outer folder, with cover art by Clyde Caldwell and interior art by Stephen Fabian.

== Reception ==
Writing a retrospective review for OD&Dities, R.E.B. Tongue compared this product to the previously published The Grand Duchy of Karameikos gazetteer, noting, "[The Golden Khan of Ethengar] is excellently written, evoking the style of this land. It is easily the equal of the Karameikan Gazetteer in this style, providing much setting information, and is even superior in one way - the adventures section is far larger, and contains some adventures that are almost ready to play." Tongue pointed out that the horse-based culture of Ethengar would not be a good fit for some dungeon-based campaigns, and concluded by giving the product a rating of 9.5 out of 10 for its writing and information, but only 7.5 out of 10 for its usefulness to most gamemasters.
