= Night Howlers =

Tabletop role-playing game supplement for Dungeons & Dragons

- Genre: Role-playing games
- Publisher: TSR
- Publication date: 1992

Night Howlers is an accessory for the Dungeons & Dragons fantasy role-playing game published by TSR in 1992 that enables players to create characters that are inflicted with lycanthropy.

== Contents ==
Players will require a copy of the D&D game Rules Cyclopedia to use this book. The D&D game presents lycanthropy as a disease player characters or NPCs can contract, rather than have Lycanthropes be a unique race. Any human player character (PC) can become a werecreature. Players using lycanthropic PCs must keep two sets of statistics, one for the human form, another for the beast, using the Werecreature Character Record Sheet, a single-page form that comes with the package. The "Werewolves' Manual" provides detailed descriptions of the D&D game's ten standard were-types, outlining their restrictions and special abilities. Available types include the weretiger, wererat, wereseal, weresharks, and devil swine, and most special abilities are received as level advancement bonuses. The D&D rules require lycanthropy victims to assume the alignment of their beast-form, which is usually Chaotic, but Night Howlers allows a PC lycanthrope to make a saving throw when transforming; a successful throw enables a bestial PC to retain the alignment of his human form. The book also includes role-playing tips to address the aspects of a werecreature's split personality.

Normally, an infected PC automatically transforms during the full moon, but Night Howlers enables him to resist the change with a successful saving throw; conversely, he may transform voluntarily by making a Constitution check, modified by the phase of the moon, and at higher levels a lycanthrope can change into an intermediate "beast-man," combining the special abilities of both his animal and human forms. The combat section clarifies the effects of damage—an injury suffered by the active form can affect the inactive form as well—and suggests penalties for lycanthropes who don't get enough rest. "Lycanthropic Procedures" handles some of the difficult aspects of shapeshifting, such as whether a lycanthrope can transform while wearing armor, or if a lycanthrope can ride a horse.

The "DM's Guide" covers the basics of converting existing characters to werecreatures, setting the tone of the game, and adapting published scenarios. A table compares the relative levels of human and werecreature characters, for help with designing balanced encounters. The "Valley of Wolves" chapter presents a setting that ties neatly into The Principalities of Glantri D&D Gazetteer. Scenario outlines are included, such as: "A-Hunting We Will Go", which illustrates the problems facing werecreatures on hunting expeditions, while "The White Wolf of Morlay" challenges the PCs to rescue a white wolf from Dame Genevieve, a magic researcher who uses lycanthropes for lab rats.

== Publication history ==
Night Howlers was published by TSR, Inc. as a 32-page "Werewolves' Manual", a 64-page "DM's Guide", and a 32"X21" color map sheet. Design was by Ann Dupuis and editing by Jonatha Ariadne Caspian, with a cover by Fred Fields and illustrations by James Crabtree.

== Reception ==
Keith H. Eisenbeis reviewed the module in the March/April issue of White Wolf magazine. He stated that "This is an excellent product and will be interesting to use with Dungeons and Dragons; it could also be adapted to other settings, especially a Ravenloft campaign." He highlighted that the details of the setting made gameplay better through various means and identified that, "There are more extensive systems for playing werewolves in other games but this is the best available for Dungeons and Dragons." He rated it as a 4 out of a possible 5.

In the April 1993 edition of Dragon (Issue 192), Rick Swan was relatively positive about the game, which he felt "achieves its modest goals quite successfully, providing slick, straightforward guidelines for incorporating lycanthropic PCs into Dungeons & Dragons campaigns", but he cautioned that players would require "a high tolerance for the system's eccentricities". Swan thought that keeping track of two sets of character statistics "sounds like a chore", but the Werecreature Character Record Sheet "makes it snap". He also felt that acquiring special abilities through level advancement was "a nice touch that encourages players to stick with their lycanthropic PCs though a campaign". On the downside, Swan was not impressed with the role-playing tips that "address only the most obvious aspects of a werecreature's split personality", commenting that head writer Ann Dupuis "seems more interested in physiology than psychology, making the book less useful than it could've been". Swan called the scenarios the game's strongest material, "designed to take optimum advantage of lycanthropic characters". Swan concluded that Night Howlers "lacks the atmosphere and spectacle of the Werewolf game... but it delivers the goods to D&D game players who want to shake up their campaigns... Used judiciously, Night Howlers can produce some of the wildest D&D sessions you've ever experienced."
