= Karameikos: Kingdom of Adventure =

1994 role-playing game accessory

- The Kingdom of Karameikos Boxed Set
- Author: Jeff Grubb, Aaron Allston, Thomas M. Reid
- Genre: Role-playing games
- Publisher: TSR
- Publication date: 1994

Karameikos: Kingdom of Adventure is an accessory for the Dungeons & Dragons fantasy role-playing game, published in 1994.

== Game world ==
Karameikos: Kingdom of Adventure details the Mystaran kingdom of Karameikos.

The 126-page "Explorer's Guide" covers the basics. It explains the purpose of a campaign setting, how to use the maps, and a step-by-step procedure for creating player characters. The "Adventure Book" contains scenarios and the 56-track compact disc (total time: 59:59) adds to the scenarios with dialogue and sound effects.

== Publication history ==
Karameikos: Kingdom of Adventure was designed by Jeff Grubb, Aaron Allston, and Thomas M. Reid.

== Reception ==
Scott Haring reviewed Karameikos: Kingdom of Adventure for Pyramid #11 (January/February 1995).

Rick Swan reviewed Karameikos: Kingdom of Adventure for Dragon magazine #216 (April 1995). He stated, "You're a newcomer to the AD&D game. You've played the First Quest game. You've read the Player's Handbook and understand about half of it. Now what? Well, you can 1) close your eyes, buy one of the zillion or so supplements, and hope for the best; 2) design your own adventures from scratch (good luck!); or 3) invest in the exquisite Karameikos campaign set." Swan concludes: "If you're a beginner and Karameikos fails to make your heart race, you might as well go back to crossword puzzles."

== Reviews ==
- Dragão Brasil #2 (1994) (Portuguese)
