= The Emirates of Ylaruam =

Tabletop role-playing game supplement for Dungeons & Dragons

- Cover art by Clyde Caldwell
- Author: Ken Rolston
- Illustrator: Douglas Chaffee
- Cover artist: Clyde Caldwell
- Genre: Fantasy RPG
- Publisher: TSR
- Publication date: 1987
- Pages: 64
- ISBN: 0880383925

The Emirates of Ylaruam is an gazetteer published by TSR in 1987 for the fantasy role-playing game Dungeons & Dragons that provides details about an area of Mystara called Ylaruam.

== Contents ==
The Emirates of Ylaruam is a supplement that focuses on the desert nation of Ylaruam. The book covers the history of the area known to the inhabitants, as well as its true history as known to the Immortals; the geographical and ecological data of the desert; and the different peoples that inhabit the desert.

A major section of the book details the society of the desert peoples, including justice, laws, personal obligations, religion, legends, the social structure, and the organization of authority and bureaucracy. A detachable insert provides information about the society and the country for player characters who are not native to the area. Otherwise, there are rules for creating a local character.

A new cleric subclass is included, the dervish, but this is reserved for non-player characters. There is also a detailed description of a typical desert village.

The book concludes with some ideas for campaigns in Ylaruam, explaining where certain monsters can be found and which ones feature in which legends; magical items are treated similarly. A few adventure hooks are also provided.

== Publication history ==
TSR first published Dungeons & Dragons in 1974, and the main campaign world for it became Mystara. Wanting to expand knowledge of this world, TSR started a series of gazetteers in 1987, beginning with GAZ1 The Grand Duchy of Karameikos. This was rapidly followed by GAZ2 The Emirates of Ylaruam, a 64-page saddle-stapled booklet with an outer folder that included a large colour map and an insert; it was written by Ken Rolston, with cover art by Clyde Caldwell and interior art by Douglas Chaffee.

Between 1987 and 1991, TSR produced a total of 14 gazetteers in the GAZ series of books.

== Reception ==
Lawrence Schick, in his 1991 book Heroic Worlds, called The Emirates of Ylaruam a "Fine campaign setting".

The French RPG magazine La Gazette du Donjon gave the French translation of this supplement a top rating of 5 out of 5, saying, "This is the second and final translated volume in the series, and it does not disappoint. Constituted identical to the previous one [The Grand Duchy of Karameikos], the quality is still there. This 'little' background supplement is full of information on the whole Ylaruam society: Social structure, laws, customs, and moral concepts.These particular geographical and climatic conditions make it a place where adventures will have no (or very little) connection with the rest of the world, which will favor characters native to the region over 'foreign' adventurers."
