= The Atruaghin Clans =

Tabletop role-playing game supplement for Dungeons & Dragons

- Cover art by Clyde Caldwell
- Author: William W. Connors
- Illustrators: Clyde Caldwell; Stephen Fabian
- Genre: Role-playing game
- Publisher: TSR
- Publication date: 1991
- Pages: 96
- ISBN: 0-88038-891-9

The Atruaghin Clans (product code GAZ14) is an supplement published by TSR in 1991 for the fantasy role-playing game Dungeons & Dragons.

== Contents ==
The Atruaghin Clans is a set of two booklets that detail Mystara's Atruaghin Clans, a society of five nomadic tribes loosely based on North and Central American Indian nations.

The publication consists of two booklets:

- The 64-page booklet "Player's Guide" describes the realm of the Atruaghin Clans within Mystara. After the introduction, the book is divided into the following sections: The Story of Atruaghin, Character Generation, Shamani, Spell Descriptions and sections on the individual tribes (Children of the Horse, Children of the Bear, Children of the Turtle, Children of the Tiger, Children of the Elk).
- The 32-page "Referee's Guide" outlines the history timeline, the Immortals ("Gods") involved in the Clans' history, some non-player characters, as well as "Totem Magic", "Atruaghin's Mystical Conveyor", and a note on how to adapt the content to 2nd Edition AD&D.

A large color map of the region is included.

== Publication history ==
In an attempt to broaden the popularity of D&D's Mystara campaign setting, TSR published a series of 14 gazetteers between 1987 and 1991, each focused on a different region. The last one, released in 1991, was GAZ14 The Atruaghin Clans; it contained two booklets written by William W. Connors, a large color map and an outer folder, with cover art by Clyde Caldwell and interior art by Stephen Fabian.

== Reception ==
Writing a retrospective review for OD&Dities, R.E.B. Tongue called the adaptation of real-world indigenous culture "an excellent idea that is seldom used in fantasy RPG, and it's realisation is interesting." Tongue thought the booklets were "well-written ... The interaction between [the five] tribes is well-done, and each individual tribe is well-described." However, Tongue questioned the utility of this setting, pointing out that for players more used to a traditional European feudal setting, "it might be difficult to persuade a group of players to play in such a campaign." Tongue concluded by giving this product a rating of 8.5 out of 10 for its writing and production, but only 6 out of 10 for its usefulness in a home campaign.
