= Thyatis =

The Empire of Thyatis is a powerful state in the Mystara campaign setting for the Dungeons & Dragons fantasy role-playing game. Thyatis was first mentioned in Module X1, Isle of Dread, which describes it briefly. Along with the Alphatian Empire, Thyatis was more fully detailed in the Dawn of the Emperors boxed set. Along with Alphatia, Thyatis is one of the "great powers" of Mystara.

== The Thyatian Empire ==
Thyatis (the city) is the capital of the Empire and the largest city on Mystara. It is on the southeastern coast of the continent of Brun, situated between the trade lanes of the Sea of Dread to the south and the Sea of Dawn to the east, alongside a canal ("Vanya's Girdle").

Conceptually, Thyatis is a mixture of different parts of the various historical Roman empires. It is governed by an Emperor and an Imperial Senate as per the classical Roman Empire, but enfranchises a feudal noble class similar to that of the Holy Roman Empire. The Emperor himself is akin to that of the Byzantines (as is the capital city's placement on a major strait). The Imperial Bureaucracy as described in Dawn of the Emperors is clearly inspired by that of the British Empire, as is, at least in name, one branch of the Thyatian Armed Forces, the "Retebius Air Fleet" (RAF), which consists of cavalry on flying mounts (Pegasi, Hippogriffs, Griffons, Sphinxs, Rocs, and Dragons).

Karameikos is ruled by a Thyatian nobility, but the Empire's territories consist of the western half of the Isle of Dawn, the island realms of Ochalea and the Pearl Islands, and the Thyatian Hinterlands on the southern continent of Davania, in addition to its mainland territories on Brun, which are the smallest of the Empire's territories by geographic size, but the most heavily populated and developed of them. The total land area of the Empire is approximately 800,000 square miles (2,100,000 km^{2}). Because of its political geography, Thyatis can be described as a thalassocracy.

In its long history, Thyatis has ruled other lands, including Traladara (which became Karameikos), the islands of Ierendi, the southern half of Ylaruam, and the city of Oceansend in Norwold. Thyatian settlers have colonized part of the Savage Coast and also the Heldannic Freeholds, which are ruled by a religious order devoted to the Thyatian-descended Immortal Vanya.

Thyatis has a historic rivalry with the Alphatian Empire, and the two imperial powers devote much of their energy and attention to each other. At the start of the official timeline (AC 1000, or thousand years after the crowning of the first Emperor of Thyatis, in the Thyatian calendar), they are locked in a struggle resembling that of the Cold War, and several published high-level modules have their territorial disputes as a backdrop (notably CM 1, M1, M2, and M5).

== Metropolitan Thyatis ==
"Mainland" Thyatis, which includes several islands, has 3,200,000 inhabitants, and consists of the following dominions:

- Actius, a small southeastern island county known for its shipbuilding and sea elven community.
- Biazzan, a trading city in a mountain pass in northwestern Thyatis, home of a respected university.
- Borydos, an eastern island used as an imperial prison.
- Buhrohur, a mountain barony inhabited by dwarves, in northern Thyatis.
- Carytion, a lush eastern island used as a luxury retreat by Thyatis' wealthy.
- Halathius, a mountain county in northern Thyatis renowned for its gold mines.
- Hattias, a county covering a large island directly south of Thyatis City, across Vanya's Girdle, known for its population of militant, often racially jingoistic, Thyatians.
- Kantrium, a small duchy in eastern Thyatis.
- Kerendas, a large, populous duchy known for its horse breeding and for training the best cavalry in the Empire.
- Lucinius, a county on a peninsula east of Thyatis City, known for its shipbuilding and maritime skills.
- Machetos, a small duchy in western Thyatis, bordering Karameikos.
- Mositius, an island duchy in eastern Thyatis, known for tourism and the magical mists that often cover the island.
- Retebius, a duchy in eastern Thyatis renowned for training Thyatis' aerial cavalry.
- Sclaras, a small island in southeastern Thyatis, carved into 250 160-acre (0.65 km^{2}) estates, each held by a powerful Thyatian archmage (36th level D&D).
- Tel Akbir, eastern duchy inhabited by Alaysians, known for their light cavalry skills.
- Terentias, island in western Thyatis known for their seafaring and swashbuckling ways. It has a high proportion of elven inhabitants.
- Thyatis, the Duchy of - dominion held directly by the Emperor, most densely populated realm in the Empire and a center of war and trade "for a thousand years, and may be for a thousand more" per Dawn of the Emperors.
- Thyatis City, the largest city in Mystara, situated on Vanya's Girdle and along the Mesonian River, north of the island of Hattias, in the center of the Dutchy of Thyatis. The Empire's "Heart" and Mystara's Rome or Constantinople. The inhabitants do not refer to it as "Thyatis City", but they simply call it "Thyatis".
- Vyalia, a woodland county in western Thyatis inhabited by the Vyalia Elves. It is known as the home of the Foresters, a fighting order of wizard-warriors.

== Imperial Dominions ==
Thyatis' overseas territories, which cover most of the Empire's land area, include:

- Ochalea, a large island domain south of Thyatis, west of the Isle of Dawn
- The Pearl Islands, an island chain south of the Alphatian Isles and west of Belissaria.
- Caerdwicca, a domain on the southern coast of the Isle of Dawn.
- Furmenglave, a small domain near Caerdwicca on the Isle of Dawn.
- Provincia Septentriona, a province on the Shadow Coast of the Isle of Dawn.
- Provincia Meridiona, a province on the Shadow Coast, south of Septentriona and north of Furmenglave on the Isle of Dawn.
- West Portage, a trading port in the neck of the Isle of Dawn.
- Redstone, a fair domain on the western portion of the Isle of Dawn, opposite Thyatis itself across the Western Sea of Dawn.
- Kendach, a fortified county in the center of the Isle of Dawn.
- Westrourke, a large Grand Duchy in northwestern Isle of Dawn.
- Helskir, a sometime dominion at the northern tip of the Isle of Dawn.
- Thyatian Hinterlands, a recently conquered dominion on the northern coast of the continent of Davania, south of the Sea of Dread and west of Ochalea.

== Further development ==
The adventures of the boxed set Wrath of the Immortals takes place within the context of a great war between the two, climaxing in the weakening of Thyatis and the sinking of the continent of Alphatia. Subsequently, Thyatis conquered a few formerly Alphatian territories, suffered setbacks and plague, and by the final official publication that made much mention of Thyatis (Joshuan's Almanac) seemed to be on the road for a gradual recovery. Many campaigns did not use Wrath of the Immortals and the development of their versions of Mystaran countries, particularly Thyatis and Alphatia, may have diverged greatly. In particular those who used earlier published modules, such as CM1 Test of the Warlords or M5 Talons of Night, which involved different conflicts and possible resolutions, could have ended up with very different versions of the Empires than what occurred in the Wrath timeline.

In a review of the adventures Arena of Thyatis and Legions of Thyatis, game designer Ken Rolston called Thyatis "a D&D-game version of ancient Rome", and the city of Thyatis itself an "ancient Roman city": "You have your basic criminal syndicates, debauched and corrupt senators, sinister intrigues, big parties, and lots of hearty Spartacus-style gladiators".
