= The Dwarves of Rockhome =

Tabletop role-playing game supplement for Dungeons & Dragons

- Author: Aaron Allston
- Genre: Role-playing game
- Publisher: TSR
- Publication date: 1988
- Pages: 96

The Dwarves of Rockhome is an accessory for the Dungeons & Dragons fantasy role-playing game.

== Contents ==
The Dwarves of Rockhome is a supplement which details the dwarven land of Rockhome, and includes rules for dwarf characters.

== Publication history ==
The Dwarves of Rockhome was written by Aaron Allston, with a cover by Clyde Caldwell and interior illustrations by Stephen Fabian, and was published by TSR in 1988 as a 96-page booklet with a large color map and an outer folder.
