= Red Steel (boxed set) =

Tabletop role-playing game supplement

- Cover of the boxed set
- Genre: Role-playing games
- Publisher: TSR
- Media type: Boxed set

Red Steel is an accessory for the 2nd edition of the Advanced Dungeons & Dragons fantasy role-playing game.

== Contents ==
Red Steel features a dust, vermeil, which grants extraordinary powers to anyone who brews it up and drinks it, but also may cause excruciating physical deformities, and rocks, cinnabryl, which can be formed into jewelry that fends off the side effects of vermeil, and shaped into weapons capable of wounding magical creatures. Both substances permeate the war-ravaged lands of the Savage Coast (introduced in 1985's X9 The Savage Coast module), spewing enchantments.

The box includes two booklets, the larger one devoted the game systems, and the smaller one to the Savage Coast setting itself. Rounding out the package are three maps and a compact disc.

Originally colonized by outcasts and criminals, the subtropical shoreline now consists of a string of self-contained city-states populated by lizard men, the feline rakasta, and intelligent spiders. Vermeil has tinted the plants, sky, and even the residents' skin a dull red. A thorough history provides insight into the region's brutal past. The Dream River, bordered by amber lotuses whose pollen induces sleep, runs from the canine kingdom of Renardy to the Plain of Dreams. The aranea, a race of devious arachnids, occupy Herath, the City of Mages.

In addition to the usual humans and elves, player characters can be aranea, rakasta, lupins (dogheaded humanoids), or tortles (bipedal turtles). New character kits include the Gaucho and Webmaster. Virtually all intelligent creatures, PCs included, gain magical abilities called Legacies when they enter the area. Most characters get a single Legacy, though some, such as those taking the Inheritor character kit, may acquire several. Legacies resemble standard AD&D game spells, but as soon as a character gains a Legacy, they begin to lose points from an ability score (chosen by the DM). The character also begins to turn red and develop a physical deformity related to their Legacy. These deformities may be avoided by wearing a cinnabryl amulet. Cinnabryl, however, loses its protective abilities at the rate of one ounce per week.

== Publication history ==
The Red Steel set is an Advanced Dungeons & Dragons game supplement published by TSR, Inc. as a boxed set containing one 128-page book, one 32-page book, three 21" X 32" map sheets, and one audio compact disc (15 tracks; playing time: 62: 28). Based directly on Bruce Heard's The Voyage of the Princess Ark articles published in Dragon and later in Champions of Mystara, development for the AD&D Game was produced by Tim Beach, editing by Lester Smith, and illustrations by Randy Post and Dee Barnett. The audio was by Gordon Hookailo (producer), Flint Dille (interactive director), Buzz Dixon (associate producer and script), Tim Beach (script), and Dominic Messinger (score).

== Reception ==
Rick Swan reviewed Red Steel for Dragon magazine #216 (April 1995). He commented: "Most AD&D game supplements feature personalities and settings. Some feature treasures and monsters. Red Steel is the first to feature dust and rocks." Swan compared the set to Masque of the Red Death and Other Tales, which he reviewed in the same column, suggesting that "Red Steel is the flipside of Masque of the Red Death; where Masque reduces the role of magic, Red Steel beefs it up, big time." He commented about length about the included compact disc, "which I could've lived without. It's not that it's badly produced—in fact, it's better engineered than the last Green Day album—I just can't figure out what do with it. Most of the disc contains mood music, some reminiscent of a film soundtrack, the rest sounding like it belongs in a medieval dentist's office. Elsewhere, a poor man's Bela Lugosi narrates a track of introductory material. For those wanting to enhance their game sessions with something other than the radio, the CD fills the bill. For everybody else . . . well, I wouldn't buy Red Steel just for the music. He comments that, "Sadly, there are no full-blown adventures, just a few outlines (though they're pretty good ones). And with so much territory to cover, we only get a—sigh—cursory peek at the various cultures." Swan states that "as in Masque of the Red Death the setting is secondary to the rules. And the rules are a wacky delight." Swan concludes his review by saying: "Engrossing and nervy, Red Steel takes the AD&D game in a lot of unexpected directions, and I'm not just talking about fighters being able to blast magic missiles. The economics are different; consider the trade ramifications where cynnabryl is more precious than gold. The balance of power is different; how, for instance, does a ruler keep the peace in a community of self-absorbed spell-casters? Even the animals are different; it's possible to run into a werewolf with red fur or a spike-covered goblin. On the downside, Red Steel's emphasis on rules doesn't leave much room for the civilization. I wanted to know more about cynnabryl black marketeers, vermeil cultists, tortle armament merchants. Put it this way: if TSR offered to swap the CD for a Savage Coast source book, I'd Federal Express mine to them this afternoon. As it stands, Red Steel is a tantalizing introduction to an exciting world, one I hope TSR revisits soon."

== Reviews ==
- Dragão Brasil (Issue 6 - Sep 1995) (Portuguese)
