= Champions of Mystara =

Tabletop role-playing game supplement for Dungeons & Dragons

- Genre: Role-playing games
- Publisher: TSR
- Publication date: 1993
- Media type: Boxed set

Champions of Mystara is an accessory for the Dungeons & Dragons fantasy role-playing game, published in 1993.

== Contents ==
This boxed set for the Dungeons & Dragons game is based on the "Princess Ark" chronicles from the pages of Dragon magazine, and includes everything needed to build a campaign around Prince Haldemar of Haaken and his skyship. The "Designer's Manual" explains how to construct skyships from scratch and launch them into outer space. The void between worlds is as frigid as an arctic night, negative gravity planes can cause vessels to capsize in mid-air, and passengers who do not wear air masks or cast spells to create an atmosphere are at risk of suffocation.

This boxed set includes the following items:

- Champions of Mystara: Designers Manual, which is a 64-page booklet for creating Skyships, the mode of transportation central to this module. The booklet includes details regarding Skyship engineering, air travel, aerial combat, and navigating to other worlds. There is a Skyship Record Sheet as well.
- Champions of Mystara: Heroes of the Princess Ark, which is the adventure that was serialized in Dragon Magazine issues #153 - #188. The booklet is 95 pages, and includes detailed descriptions of the Princess Ark skyship and its crew. It also includes a chronicle of the skyship's travels.
- Champions of Mystara: Explorer's Manual,which is a geographical and cultural expansion for Mystara, highlighting two of the cultures featured in the Dragon Magazine printing of Princess Ark, as well as introducing two new cultures: the Graakhalians and the Karimari. It includes regional information, provided in a gazetteer style. This booklet is also 64 pages.
- A map of the Great Wastes
- A map of the Serpent Peninsula
- 2 deckplans for the Princess Ark, suitable for use with 25mm scale miniatures
- 8 skyship recognition cards
- A customer response card
- A Winter 1993 TSR catalog

== Publication history ==
Champions of Mystara was designed by Ann Dupuis and Bruce A. Heard, and published by TSR as a boxed set containing eight vehicle blueprints and four poster maps. The box art was by Robh Ruppel, with book cover art by Fred Fields and interior art by Terry Dykstra. The publication date is 1993.

== Reception ==
Rick Swan reviewed Champions of Mystara for Dragon magazine No. 202 (February 1994). He suggests that fans "mourning the loss of the "Princess Ark" chronicles [...] can console themselves with this lavish boxed set". He compared the space exploration feature of the set to the Spelljammer setting for AD&D, noting that "Mystara physics aren't nearly as cooperative", raising the question, "You thought piloting an Alphatian yacht would be easy?" Keith H. Eisenbeis reviewed the module in a 1994 issue of White Wolf. He stated that the product, "provides all that’s necessary to bring the adventure elements of this excellent series into the D&D game setting". He rated it at 3 out of 5 points for Value, and 4 points for Appearance, Concepts, Complexity, and Playability.
