= The Elves of Alfheim =

Tabletop role-playing game supplement for Dungeons & Dragons

- Authors: Steve Perrin and Anders Swenson
- Genre: Role-playing game
- Publisher: TSR
- Publication date: 1988
- Pages: 96

The Elves of Alfheim is an accessory for the Dungeons & Dragons fantasy role-playing game that describes the elven forest nation of Alfheim in the Mystara setting.

== Contents ==
The Elves of Alfheim is a sourcebook which details the elf nation of Alfheim.

== Publication history ==
The Elves of Alfheim was written by Steve Perrin and Anders Swenson, with a cover by Clyde Caldwell and interior illustrations by Stephen Fabian, and was published by TSR in 1988 as a 96-page booklet with a large color map and an outer folder.
