= Elementalist =

Elementalist may refer to:

== Gaming ==
- a type of character in the Dragon Warriors games series
- a type of character in the Dungeons & Dragons nation Glantri
- a type of character in the Guild Wars game franchise
- a type of character in the game High Adventure Role Playing
- a type of character in the Dungeons & Dragons game Lejendary Adventure
- a type of character in the game Soul of the Ultimate Nation
- a character in the game South Park: The Fractured but Whole
- a character in the board game Talisman
- a type of character in the game The Legend of Legacy
- a type of character in the Dungeons & Dragons game Tome of Magic
- a type of character in the game Tree of Savior

== Other uses ==
- characters in the comic-book series Urth 4
- The Elementalist, a 1919 illustrated book by Emil Preetorius
