= Dungeons & Dragons: Warriors of the Eternal Sun =

1992 video game

- European cover art by Clyde Caldwell
- Developer: Westwood Associates
- Publisher: Sega
- Designers: Louis Castle; Mark Lindstrom; E. Ettore Annunziata
- Composers: Paul Mudra; Frank Klepacki; Dwight Okahara
- Series: Dungeons & Dragons; Mystara
- Platform: Sega Genesis
- Release: NA/EU: August 1992
- Genre: Role-playing video game
- Mode: Single-player

Dungeons & Dragons: Warriors of the Eternal Sun is a role-playing video game developed for the Sega Genesis in 1992 by Westwood Associates. The game tells the story of a party of adventurers who have been transported to an unknown world and must survive against its hostile inhabitants while learning about their new home and seeking allies. It is based on the Dungeons & Dragons (D&D) game rules, and uses creatures and themes from the D&D Hollow World campaign setting, such as Blacklore elves, the Azcans, beastmen, Malpheggi lizardmen, and dinosaurs.

== Plot ==
Duke Barrik's army is at war with the goblin army. The goblins are making a final push into Barrik's castle. However, before the goblin attack begins, the ground begins to shake, the sky tears open and both armies are sucked into a void.

Duke Barrik's castle is transported to a valley enclosed with impossibly tall cliffs and a brilliant red sun overhead (the "Eternal Sun" of the title). The goblins are nowhere to be seen, and the humans appear to be stranded in this new world. The Duke requests that the four player characters explore this strange environment to find allies.

The party discovers a beastman cave, but the creatures are not friendly. After fighting through the beastmen tribe, the party collects artifacts from their caves which they discover are from a different time period. With the assistance of the King's advisor, Marmillian, they are able to explore further into the caves and locate the swampland home of the lizardmen.

Although the lizardmen are hostile, the party acquires knowledge from them that helps them explore the caves in the North. This leads them to a jungle where the ancient Azcan race of people still thrive. Exploring their temple results in more bloodshed, but the party unearths items that they need in order to explore the volcano in the west and finally locate an ally.

While they are adventuring, an unseen force is slowly turning the Duke's people against the party. They grow increasingly insane and hostile throughout the course of the adventure. When the party returns to the castle with news of their success, they discover that everyone apart from Marmillian has disappeared. Marmillian explains that the townspeople went mad due to the influence of the 'Burrower', a creature brought to this world by the immortal Thanatos, to undo the works of Ka the Preserver, a god that collects species from other worlds and keeps them in this 'zoo' underneath the eternal sun. The party must unravel the final mysteries of this new world and use an ancient spell that summons Ka the Preserver to destroy the Burrower and return their people to safety.

== Gameplay ==
=== Characters ===
The player controls a party of four player characters (PCs). The party of PCs can be made up of any combination of the following character types: cleric, fighter, magic-user, thief, dwarf, elf, and halfling. Fighters and dwarves are the strongest in battle and are the most skilled with weapons. Magic-users have the best range of spells, but they are the weakest fighters. Elves have a good balance between fighting and spellcasting, but do not excel in either. Clerics have healing and support-based magic spells and are reasonably competent in battle, and they can use their holy powers to repel the undead. Thieves are stealthy, can disarm traps and hide in shadows, and eventually develop minor magic capabilities. Halflings share the talents of a thief, but suffer at combat.

The player can decide the name and gender of their characters and choose between four colours of clothing. These are cosmetic details that do not effect the actual gameplay. The abilities of the different character classes are based on the rules of the original Dungeons & Dragons game.

The characters' ability scores—strength, dexterity, constitution, intelligence, wisdom, and charisma — are determined during the character creation process via simulated dice rolls. The maximum ability score at the start of the game is eighteen. The ability scores affect gameplay. For example, characters with a high strength score can cause more damage in combat, and characters with a high constitution will receive more hit points.

Characters will increase in levels as the game progresses, learning new skills and earning more hit points.

=== Modes ===
There are three distinct styles of gameplay: outside adventure mode, outside combat mode, and dungeon mode.

In outside adventure mode, the player has an isometric view on their characters as they travel around the world map. The party is controlled as one, and each member will follow the lead character's movements. The movements of the party are in real-time. When the party encounters random battles or set combat events (such as a Beastman camp or an ambush on a bridge), the game will switch into outside combat mode.

The outside combat mode is turn-based. A PC is highlighted with a white box when it is that PC's turn. This selected character can move a short distance, attack or use a special ability. The combat system is based on an automated version of the D&D rules, so each character and enemy has hit points and an armor class rating. If the enemies are killed or flee, the party is awarded experience points and occasionally treasure. If the PCs are killed in battle, their tombstones will be displayed, and the game will end. The player can attempt to flee the battle by moving the characters away from the enemies.

The dungeon mode differs from the other modes, as it uses a first person view instead of the isometric view used in the other modes. The game switches to this mode when the party enters a cave or building. The screen displays what the party can see in the dungeon, along with a compass and textual information describing the surroundings (similar to how a D&D Dungeon Master would describe an adventure). Encounters with enemies are real-time events, moving the focus away from slow and strategic combat of the outside mode to a faster-paced style. In addition, weapons and spells can have different effects in this mode; for example, the lightning bolt spell will bounce off the dungeon walls and possibly backfire on the party. The party also needs to be cautious of traps and hidden doors while exploring the dungeons.

== Development ==
Warriors of the Eternal Sun was the first and only official D&D product for the Sega Genesis. It features twenty-nine musical tracks. Its working title was Dungeons & Dragons: Hollow World. During development, changes had been made to the D&D rules to make the video game work due to hardware limitations. Many of the testers were not familiar with the tabletop game, so the development process proved to be difficult.

== Reception ==
Reception

Review score
Publication	Score
AllGame	2.5/5

The game is rated as 'Average' on allgame.

According to a 2004 GameSpy article, "Warriors of the Eternal Sun would do little to entice console gamers away from the like of Phantasy Star or Final Fantasy".

In a 2008 retrospective on Dungeons & Dragons video games, IGN called Warriors of the Eternal Sun a "mixed bag", complimenting the battle system and graphical style, but calling it a "crib sheet" effort which was not preferable to other RPGs available at the time.

== See also ==
- Mystara – The fictional world that includes the Hollow World setting
- Dungeons & Dragons: Order of the Griffon - A TurboGrafx-16 RPG video game also developed by Westwood Associates and set in Mystara
