= Savage Coast Campaign Book =

- The Savage Coast Campaign Book PDF (1996)
- Author: Tim Beach and Bruce Heard
- Genre: Role-playing games
- Publisher: TSR
- Publication date: 1996

Savage Coast Campaign Book is an accessory for the 2nd edition of the Advanced Dungeons & Dragons fantasy role-playing game, published in 1996.

== Contents ==
The Savage Coast Campaign Book contains information for a Savage Coast campaign, including descriptions of its nations to rules for creating player characters, and from details on the Legacies of the Red Curse to advice for running adventures.

== Publication history ==
In 1996 the Savage Coast setting was revised and re-released under the AD&D: Odyssey line as three fully online products available for free download. This range included the base Savage Coast Campaign Book by Tim Beach and Bruce Heard, a supplement Savage Coast: Orc's Head and a Monstrous Compendium Appendix.
