= The Complete Priest's Handbook =

1990 book by Aaron Allston

- Author: Aaron Allston
- Genre: Role-playing game
- Publisher: TSR
- Publication date: 1990
- Pages: 128

The Complete Priest's Handbook is a supplemental rulebook published in 1990 for the 2nd edition of the Advanced Dungeons & Dragons fantasy role-playing game. Accompanying manuals are The Complete Fighter's Handbook, Thief's Handbook, and Wizard's Handbook.

== Contents ==
The Complete Priest's Handbook is a rules supplement for the 2nd edition Player's Handbook which details priestly characters and the role of religion in campaigns. The book includes rules for priest kit subclasses, and 60 sample priesthoods.

This AD&D game supplement provides noble priests, outlaw priests, fighting monks, amazon priestesses, and other “priest kits”; priest personality archetypes like the crusader, philosopher, hypocrite, and earnest novice; 60 sample priesthoods of deities for agriculture, birth, disease, elemental forces, hunting, literature, oceans, oracles, trade, wind, wisdom, and more; and rules for designing new faiths. There are new weapons and equipment, martial-arts rules, and adventure hooks for priest characters.

== Publication history ==
PHBR3 The Complete Priest's Handbook was written by Aaron Allston, with illustrations by Thomas Baxa, and was published by TSR in 1990 as a 128-page book.

== Reception ==
Stewart Wieck reviewed the publication in the October–November 1990 issue of White Wolf, rating it overall as a 4 out of a possible 5. Allston stated, "Of all the Handbooks, I recommend this one most. Not only is the material presented of superb quality, but it also goes the farthest in defining the character class so that even members of the same class are distinctive."

Allen Varney reviewed The Complete Priest's Handbook for Dragon magazine #165 (January 1991). He comments on the book by asking, "Is there anything so unlikely as a "generic priest"?" Varney's concluding comments in the review are: "Never thought of an all-priest campaign? Then you never saw The Complete Priest's Handbook. Bravo! (Or do I mean "Hallelujah"?)"

== Reviews ==
- Casus Belli #59
- Casus Belli #82
