= The Unicorn Hunt =

Novel by Elaine Cunningham

- First edition cover
- Author: Elaine Cunningham
- Series: "First Quest"
- Genre: Fantasy
- Set in: Mystara
- Publisher: Wizards of the Coast
- Publication date: February 1995
- Publication place: United States
- Media type: Print

The Unicorn Hunt is a fantasy novel by Elaine Cunningham, in the "First Quest" series, and based on the Dungeons & Dragons game.

== Plot summary ==
The Unicorn Horn is a novel in which magic student Korigan goes with his magician uncle on a quest for a unicorn horn to save his mother's life.

== Reviews ==
- Kliatt
- Review by Carolyn Cushman (1995) in Locus, #408 January 1995
- Review by John C. Bunnell (1995) in Dragon Magazine, May 1995
