= Hollow World Campaign Set =

Tabletop role-playing game supplement for Dungeons & Dragons

- The cover to the Hollow World boxed set
- Genre: Role-playing game
- Publisher: TSR, Inc.
- Publication date: 1990
- Media type: Boxed set

The Hollow World Campaign Set is an accessory for the Dungeons & Dragons fantasy role-playing game.

== Contents ==
Hollow World is a campaign setting boxed set detailing the enormous hollow inside of the planet of Mystara, and the people and creatures that inhabit the lands found there.

This detailed campaign boxed set proposes that within the sphere of the "Known World" is another world called the Hollow World, a sub-setting for the Mystara campaign world. Hollow World acts as a living "cultural museum" for the planet, forever preserving cultures and races that are near extinction on the surface world.

This box set includes the following:

- A 128-page softbound Dungeon Master's Sourcebook
- A 64-page softbound Player's Guide book
- A 32-page softbound Adventure Book
- Four single-sided poster maps

The books include information about new monsters, elves, dwarves, character classes, pirates, and immortals.

== Publication history ==
Hollow World was written by Aaron Allston, with a cover by Fred Fields and interior illustrations by Thomas Baxa and Mark Nelson, and was published by TSR in 1990 as a boxed set containing a 128-page book, a 64-page book, and a 32-page book, and four large color maps.

== Reviews ==
- Casus Belli #61
- RPGNow Downloader Monthly (Issue 10 - Nov 2003)
