= Beastmen =

Beastmen can refer to:

- Beastmen (Warhammer), in the Warhammer fantasy setting
- Beasts of Chaos, an army in the Warhammer fantasy setting
- Beastmen, in Dungeons & Dragons: Warriors of the Eternal Sun
- Beastmen, in the manga BNA: Brand New Animal
