= Legions of Thyatis =

Dungeons & Dragons adventure module

- The cover to Legions of Thyatis; artwork by Brom
- Code: DDA2
- TSR product code: 9296
- Rules required: Dungeons & Dragons
- Campaign setting: Mystara
- Authors: John Nephew
- First published: 1990

Linked modules
- DDA1 DDA2

Legions of Thyatis is an adventure module published in 1990 for the Dungeons & Dragons fantasy role-playing game.

== Plot summary ==
Legions of Thyatis is a sequel to Arena of Thyatis, and contains an adventure scenario in which the player characters explore catacombs to prevent a corrupt senator from removing the magic that protects Thyatis City from the monsters beneath the city.

== Publication history ==
DDA2 Legions of Thyatis was published by TSR, Inc. in 1990 as a 32-page booklet with an outer folder.
It was written by John Nephew, with a cover by Brom and editing by Jon Pickens.

== Reception ==
Ken Rolston reviewed Legions of Thyatis for Dragon magazine #171 (July 1991). He reviewed Arena of Thyatis and Legions of Thyatis together, and called them "two ambitious and original approaches to low-level D&D adventures", noting gladiators as the theme, and calling the setting "a D&D-game version of ancient Rome". He praised the "open-ended, improvisational role-playing", noting that "the DM is out there all alone with a package of loosely linked episodes, lots of strong NPCs, and myriad plot threads blowing in the wind" without any "hackneyed, predictable plot elements". He did, however, feel that this adventure might not be suitable for most first D&D campaigns, with a first-time DM simultaneously trying to master the mechanics and rhythm of refereeing an FRPG and the subtle dramatic and manipulative techniques of open-ended scenario presentation. He recalled that the module Treasure Hunt, "a much more linear and predictable scenario than these two adventures" has a two-page appendix entitled "If Things Go Wrong", and felt that sort of commentary and advice would be even more critical in open-ended settings like Arena of Thyatis and Legions of Thyatis. He felt that "the ancient Roman city" of Thyatis "doesn't mix comfortably with heroic, D&D-game, action-adventure role-playing", and noted that the impact of spell-casters doesn't seem to have been considered. Rolston concluded the review by stating: "My first response was impatient and unforgiving; only my persistence in trying to appreciate Nephew's good intentions gave me a reserved affection for the most appealing features of these modules. Give them a split grade: four stars for originality, charm, role-playing potential, and right-mindedness, and two stars for quality of DM staging, plot support, and suitability for D&D-game-style play. I do not recommend them for beginning DMs, but as an earnest and moderately successful approach to designing a module for open-ended, improvisational role-playing for the D&D game, they may inspire you to experiment with this difficult but rewarding style of FRPG adventure."
