= Vampire (Dungeons & Dragons) =

Fictional monster from Dungeons & Dragons

- First appearance: the Dungeons & Dragons "white box" set (1974)

In-universe information
- Type: Undead
- Alignment: Any Evil

In the Dungeons & Dragons fantasy role-playing game, a vampire is an undead creature. A humanoid or monstrous humanoid creature can become a vampire, and looks as it did in life, with pale skin, haunting red eyes, and a feral cast to its features. A new vampire is created when another vampire drains the life out of a living creature. Its depiction is related to those in the 1930s and 1940s Hollywood monster movies such as Dracula. In writing vampires into the game, as with other creatures arising in folklore, the authors had to consider what elements arising in more recent popular culture should be incorporated into their description and characteristics.

== Publication history ==
The vampire was one of the earliest creatures introduced in the Dungeons & Dragons game. The vampire as a player character concept was present in Dave Arneson's playtest group for the original version of the rules. It led to the creation of a vampire-hunter, which became the basis of the cleric class.

Inspired by Gothic fiction, the vampire is a typical denizen of the Ravenloft setting.

=== Dungeons & Dragons (1974–1976) ===
The vampire was one of the first monsters introduced in the earliest edition of the game, in the Dungeons & Dragons "white box" set (1974), where they were described simply as powerful undead. Vampires were further detailed in Supplement I: Greyhawk (1975).

=== Advanced Dungeons & Dragons 1st edition (1977–1988) ===
The vampire appears in the first edition Monster Manual (1977), where it is described as a chaotic evil, night-prowling creature whose powerful negative force drains life energy from victims.

Dragon #25 (May 1979) details several vampire variants, including the alp, the anananngel, the asanbosam, the bruxsa, the burcolakas, the catacano, the ch'ing-shih, the ekimmu, the krvopijac, the lobishumen, the mulo, the nosferat, and the vlkodlak. This article was later reprinted in Best of Dragon, Vol. II (1981).

The vampiric lizard man appeared in the module Tomb of the Lizard King (1982).

The Lankhmar vampire appeared in the module Swords of Deceit (1986).

Dracula himself was given AD&D statistics in Dragon #126 (October 1987), along with the vrykolaka and great vrykolaka.

=== Dungeons & Dragons (1977–1999) ===
This edition of the D&D game included its own version of the vampire, in the Dungeons & Dragons Basic Set (1977), and Expert Set (1981 & 1983), and was also later featured in the Dungeons & Dragons Game set (1991), the Dungeons & Dragons Rules Cyclopedia (1991), the Classic Dungeons & Dragons Game set (1994), and the Dungeons & Dragons Adventure Game set (1999). This last set also featured the lesser vampire.

The velya, a relative of the vampire, was introduced in the module War Rafts of Kron (1984), and subsequently appeared in the Creature Catalogue (1986), and the later Creature Catalog (1993). The swamp velya was introduced in the module Legacy of Blood (1987).

The nosferatu appeared in the gazetteers of The Grand Duchy of Karameikos (1987) and The Principalities of Glantri (1987), and in the Creature Catalog (1993).

=== Advanced Dungeons & Dragons 2nd edition (1989–1999) ===
The vampire appears first in the Monstrous Compendium Volume One (1989), which also introduced the Eastern vampire. The standard vampire and the Eastern vampire are reprinted in the Monstrous Manual (1993).

Variants for the standard vampire and the Eastern vampire in the Spelljammer campaign setting were detailed in the supplement Crystal Spheres (1990).

The lidevic appeared in Dragon #158 (June 1990).

The nosferatu vampire for the Ravenloft setting appeared in the Ravenloft: Realm of Terror boxed set (1990), and later appeared in Ravenloft Monstrous Compendium Appendix III: Creatures of Darkness (1994), and Van Richten's Monster Hunter's Compendium (1999). Several vampire variants appeared in Monstrous Compendium Ravenloft Appendix (1991), including the dwarf vampire, the elf vampire, the gnome vampire, the halfling vampire, and the kender vampire; these creatures were reprinted in Ravenloft Monstrous Compendium I & II (1996). The Eastern vampire and Mayonaka appear in Monstrous Compendium Ravenloft Appendix II (1993). The illithid vampire and Athaekeetha appear in Monstrous Compendium Ravenloft Appendix II, and later in Ravenloft Monstrous Compendium I & II (1996). Thoughts of Darkness (1992), and The Illithiad (1998). The oriental vampire and the drow vampire appeared in Ravenloft Monstrous Compendium Appendix III: Creatures of Darkness. The cerebral vampire was introduced in Bleak House: The Death of Rudolph van Richten (1996), and then appeared in Monstrous Compendium Annual Volume Four (1998).

The vampire of the Mystara campaign setting was detailed in Night of the Vampire (1994). The velya and swamp velya returned in the Mystara Monstrous Compendium Appendix (1994). The nosferatu for the Savage Coast setting appeared in the Savage Coast Monstrous Compendium Appendix (1996).

Dragon Annual #1 (1996) details several undead variants, including the aswang (ghast), the baobhan sith (doppelgänger), the civatateo (mummy), the dubbelsauger (ghoul), the eretica (hag), the fravashi (succubus), the gayal (wraith), the hannya (wight), the impudulu (zombie lord), the jigarkhor (wight), the kuei (skeleton), the lemure (spectre), the moroli (wight), the nelapsi (vampire), the ohyn (goblin), the pelesit (monkey), the qarlak (wight), the ramanga (zombie), the stregoni (vampire), the tlacique (spectre), the ustrel (goblin), the vetala (wraith), the wurdalak (lycanthrope), the xloptuny (wight), the yara-ma-yha-sho (lizard man), and the zmeu (ghost).

Three unique vampires for the Forgotten Realms campaign setting appeared in Dragon #236 (November 1996): Morg; Saed, Beast Chieftain of Veld; and Saestra Karanok.

=== Dungeons & Dragons 3.0 edition (2000–2002) ===
The vampire appears in the Monster Manual for this edition (2000) as a template.

The hopping vampire appeared in Oriental Adventures (2001).

The drider vampire appeared in City of the Spider Queen (2002) for the Forgotten Realms.

=== Dungeons & Dragons 3.5 edition (2003–2007) ===
The vampire appears in the revised Monster Manual for this edition (2003), along with the elite vampire.

The moonbane vampire, the persuasive vampire, the psychic vampire, the savage vampire, and the swarmform vampire appeared in Libris Mortis: The Book of Undead (2004).

The vampire mind flayer appears in Lords of Madness (2005).

The Kasian vampire, the savage vampire, the shadow vampire and the terror vampire appeared in Dragon #348 (October 2006).

Two unique vampires, Black Duke and Red Widow appeared in Monster Manual V (2007).

=== Dungeons & Dragons 4th edition (2008–2014) ===
The vampire appears in the Monster Manual for this edition (2008).

In the supplement Heroes of Shadow (2011), the vampire is presented as a character class. The Vryloka, a race of humanoids with vampiric traits, are also presented.

Dragon Annual 2009 and Dragon Magazine 371 also had the Vampire Bloodline, a series of feats.

=== Dungeons & Dragons 5th edition (2014–present) ===
The vampire appears in the Monster Manual for this edition (2014) along with the spellcaster and warrior vampire variants as well as the weaker vampire spawn.

The jiangshi appears in Van Richten's Guide to Ravenloft (2021), along with the dhampir, which is considered a lineage that can replace a character's race.

== Description ==
A vampire could be of any type of evil alignment, and if its alignment was not evil in life, it becomes so in undeath. A vampire retains all the abilities it had in life, and gains the ability to drain blood and life energy, and to dominate other creatures with its gaze. A vampire can also command rats, bats, and wolves, or take the form of those creatures. They also become superhumanly strong, can heal quickly or even regenerate, and can turn into a gaseous form.

Some vampires worship the god Kanchelsis.

== Vampire spawn ==
Vampire Spawn

In-universe information
- Type: Undead
- Alignment: Any Evil

In the Dungeons & Dragons game, the vampire spawn are undead creatures created when a vampire slays a mortal with its bite. Vampire spawn look much the way they did in life (they are usually humanoids), except with hardened features and a predatory look. They also have greyer skin. A vampire spawn is controlled by the vampire who created them. A vampire spawn can become a normal vampire by drinking the blood of the vampire who originally turned them into a vampire spawn.

Vampire spawn are similar in their habits to vampires, being evil creatures drawn to their graves and coffins. They are less intelligent and, while still strong, are physically weaker than vampires. They cannot turn into a bat, dire bat, wolf, or dire wolf and they cannot summon rats, bats or wolves. Vampire spawn are unable to create spawn of their own. They attack by hammering opponents against walls, punching them, and tearing out their limbs. They can both energy drain, and suck the blood with a bite. Their mere gaze drains the victim of confidence, courage, energy, hope and joy. Vampire spawn have the ability to assume a gaseous form. They can also climb upon walls in the manner of a spider. Vampire spawn are, however, also vulnerable to all normal attacks and spells which repel vampires.

Vampire spawn speak Common. They can be of any evil alignment.

In the Dungeons & Dragons supplement Libris Mortis, vampire spawn, along with several other undead creatures became character classes for player characters.

== Variant vampires ==
- Moonbane Vampire – a vampire vulnerable to the light of the full moon.
- Monstrous Vampire – a non-humanoid vampire.
- Persuasive Vampire – uses the power of its speech to sway opinions of listeners.
- Psychic Vampire – drains a victim's mental strength rather than physical health.
- Savage Vampire – rely on brute force and hunt in packs.
- Swarmform Vampire – can assume the form of a swarm of creatures.
- Vampiric Dragon – vampiric dragon forever anchored to its hoard, much like a normal vampire craves its coffin. It can overcome this weakness through the use of magical trinkets, such as chokers, wrist bands and other pieces of jewelry that contains their entire horde. Most notable of these was Brimstone the Smoke drake's great diamond choker which allowed him to travel any length from his lair whenever he wanted so long as it was at night.

== In Oriental Adventures ==
- Hopping Vampire – Arises when a body is buried improperly or in an inauspicious location.
- Penanggalan – A floating head, with entrails and intestines hanging down from the neck, which it can wrap around throats and limbs to squeeze the life out of its victims before feeding on their blood.

== Notable vampires ==
- Strahd von Zarovich originally of the I6:Ravenloft adventure module and later made part of the Ravenloft Campaign Setting.
- Union of Eclipses – A powerful and influential cabal of vampires whose dominion spans multiple worlds of the Material Plane.
- Vlad Tolenkov – A sometimes consort to and advisor of Lolth, he resides in a Nightmare World trapped in the Demonweb Pits.
- Drelnza – The vampire daughter of the archmage Iggwilv, she was trapped in stasis as the guardian of the main treasure in The Lost Caverns of Tsojcanth.
- Kas the Bloody-Handed⁣ – The vampire lieutenant serving Vecna the lich, whom he would eventually betray and try to kill.

== Reception ==
Rob Bricken of io9 identified the vampire as one of "The 12 Most Obnoxious Dungeons & Dragons Monsters". A "magical and occult" creature, Detlef Wienecke-Janz and James Lovitt considered the vampire a typical monster of the Bram Stoker-inspired horror-setting of Ravenloft, while Backstab reviewer Philippe Tessier considered it a "classic of D&D".

== Other publishers ==
The vampire is fully detailed in Paizo Publishing's book Classic Horrors Revisited (2009), on pages 46–51.
