= The Five Shires =

Tabletop role-playing game supplement for Dungeons & Dragons

- Author: Ed Greenwood
- Genre: Role-playing game
- Publisher: TSR
- Publication date: 1988

The Five Shires is an accessory for the Dungeons & Dragons fantasy role-playing game.

== Contents ==
The Five Shires is a sourcebook that details the land of the halflings, who refer to themselves as the Hin. The 24-page "Player's Booklet" presents information on the Shires and their inhabitants, while the 72-page "Dungeon Masters Booklet" describes the history, geography, and more details of the Shire.

== Publication history ==
GAZ8 The Five Shires was written by Ed Greenwood, with a cover by Clyde Caldwell, and was published in 1988 by TSR as a 72-page book and a 24-page book, with a large color map and an outer folder.

== Reception ==
Lawrence Schick, in his 1991 book Heroic Worlds, calls The Five Shires "Probably the best fantasy supplement on halflings/hobbits."

== Reviews ==
- ZauberZeit (Issue 16 - Apr 1989)
