= Arena of Thyatis =

Dungeons & Dragons adventure module

- Code: DDA1
- TSR product code: 9284
- Rules required: Basic D&D
- Character levels: 2-3
- Authors: John Nephew
- First published: 1990
- ISBN: 978-0-88038-839-9

Arena of Thyatis is an adventure module published in 1990 for the Dungeons & Dragons fantasy role-playing game. This module is linked with Legions of Thyatis.

== Plot summary ==
Arena of Thyatis is an adventure scenario intended to be used with Dawn of the Emperors, in which the player characters have dealings with a senator from Thyatis and are then involved arena combat in the Coliseum.

== Publication history ==
DDA1 Arena of Thyatis was written by John Nephew, with a cover by Brom, and was published by TSR in 1990 as a 32-page booklet with an outer folder. Editing is by Jon Pickens.

== Reception ==
Ken Rolston reviewed the adventure for Dragon magazine #171 in July 1991. He reviewed it with Legions of Thyatis, and called them "two ambitious and original approaches to low-level D&D adventures", noting gladiators as the theme, and calling the setting "a D&D-game version of ancient Rome". He did, however, feel that this adventure may not be suitable for players' first D&D campaigns, where a first-time DM would be simultaneously trying to master the mechanics and rhythm of refereeing an FRPG and the subtle dramatic and manipulative techniques of open-ended scenario presentation. Rolston concluded the review of the two modules by stating: "Give them a split grade: four stars for originality, charm, roleplaying potential, and right-mindedness, and two stars for quality of DM staging, plot support, and suitability for D&D-game-style play. I do not recommend them for beginning DMs, but as an earnest and moderately successful approach to designing a module for open-ended, improvisational role-playing for the D&D game".
