= The Complete Thief's Handbook =

Role-playing game supplement

- Author: John Nephew, Carl Sargent, and Douglas Niles
- Genre: Role-playing game
- Publisher: TSR
- Publication date: 1989
- Pages: 128

The Complete Thief's Handbook is a supplemental rulebook published in 1989 for the 2nd edition of the Advanced Dungeons & Dragons fantasy role-playing game. Accompanying manuals are The Complete Fighter's Handbook, Priest's Handbook, and Wizard's Handbook.

== Contents ==
The Complete Thief's Handbook is a rules supplement for the 2nd edition Player's Handbook which details the thief class, including 18 "kit" subclasses.

Also included is a section on creating a "Lone Wolf;" essentially a one-character class designed using the class, creation rules in the Dungeon Master's Guide. A sample Lone Wolf character is included as a demonstration of the process.

== Publication history ==
PHBR2 The Complete Thief's Handbook was written by John Nephew, Carl Sargent, and Douglas Niles, with illustrations by George Barr, and was published by TSR in 1990 as a 128-page book.

== Reception ==
Jolly R. Blackburn reviewed The Complete Fighter's Handbook and The Complete Thief's Handbook in Shadis #4 and said that "Both books offer a wealth of information. Are they worth the price? I would have to say it depends on the individual and the campaign he is playing in. If you find yourself playing certain character classes to the exclusion of others, then these books would probably be greatly appreciated." Stewart Wieck reviewed the product in a 1990 issue of White Wolf along with the Fighter's, Priest's, and Wizard's Handbooks. He highlighted the sections on the Thieves Guilds and the Thief Campaign, noting of the latter that "Of all such sections in any of the Handbooks, the Thief Campaign succeeds most because it presents a number of ideas and approaches that would make the thief a true joy to play."

== Reviews ==
- Casus Belli #58
