= Joshuan's Almanac & Book of Facts =

1995 role-playing game accessory

- Genre: Role-playing games
- Publisher: TSR
- Publication date: 1995

Joshuan's Almanac & Book of Facts is an accessory for the Dungeons & Dragons fantasy role-playing game, published in 1995.

== Contents ==
Joshuan's Almanac & Book of Facts is a supplement which provides hints to player characters about the campaign setting of Mystara. The Almanac is written in the voice of the halfling Joshuan Gallidox and several other correspondents, and describes the world by one kingdom after another, including important characters, miscellanea about Mystara, explores some history and recent events for the year 1013, shares some predictions, and publishes classified ads.

== Publication history ==
Joshuan's Almanac & Book of Facts featured design by Ann Dupuis and Elizabeth Thornabene, and was published by TSR in 1995. Cover art is by Alan Pollack, with interior art by David O. Miller.

== Reception ==
Trenton Webb reviewed Joshuan's Almanac & Book of Facts for Arcane magazine, rating it a 4 out of 10 overall. He called the book "More of a Hitchhiker's Guide than an Encyclopædia Galactica". He felt that the trouble with the book was that "like its eponymous publisher, it's a jack of all trades. It's an admirable attempt to lay a foundation on which future campaigns can be built, and it delivers some strong ideas, but these are strangled by the nature of Mystara, the book's pedantic format and its being written in character." As a result, he considers the book "a fitful work", noting that Mystara, "a traditional Tolkienesque world" is here portrayed as "sickly sweet and packed to the gills with jolly, close harmony singing folk with big feet". He felt that the geographical descriptions "form a 100-page log jame, while the correspondents' characters have all the charm of daytime TV presenters". He recommended that if players are currently using Mystara as their world, then it might be worth the price, but if not then he advised, "don't panic - it's mostly harmless".
