= Glantri =

The Principalities of Glantri is a fictional nation located within the Mystara campaign setting, in the Dungeons & Dragons fantasy role-playing game.

Located in the northwestern corner of the Known World, Glantri is a Magocracy ruled by powerful magic using princes and princesses. The capital of Glantri is Glantri City.

== Description ==
Glantri is a country ruled by and for magicians. Designer Ken Rolston called Glantri "Quite an unusual D&D game setting", as it is a nation run by an aristocracy of magic-users, with disguised lycanthropes, vampires, necromancers, liches, and Immortals numbered among them; and "a nation where religion is prohibited, and where being a cleric is a capital offense".

In Glantri, various aristocratic clans and houses struggle for control of the Council of Princes. Included among the political factions are medieval Scottish refugees from beyond space and time, blood-sucking nosferatu, liches, albino werewolves, dark-skinned elves in the manner of 17th-century Spanish nobles, expatriate Mongol princes, and Immortals incognito.

== Geography ==
=== The land ===
Glantri is enclosed between two major mountain chains, the Khurish Massif and the Wendarian Range through which several major rivers have carved wide valleys, which are densely inhabited. Forests cover the majority of the mountain lands, while the hills are rich in plants, and the valleys have been cleared for farming.

=== The capital ===
Glantri City, is a town of 50,000 built partially on a set of islands at the confluence of the Isoile and Vesubia rivers. The city is known for its fantastic buildings, the widespread use of magic in its construction and for public convenience including public lighting, its maze of channels, and the foremost school of magic in the Known World.

Glantri City includes an assortment of guilds and brotherhoods, such as Beggar's Court, the Elven Liberation Front, the Free Fundamentalist Farmers, the Monster Handler's Syndicate, and the Thousand Fists of Khan, each with conflicting interests and political machinations. A magic-user's career includes enrollment in the Glantrian School of Magic, which permits a magic-user to learn new skills, like quick spell-casting and the ability to combine spells. The Seven Secret Orders of the Great School of Magic are the Alchemists, Dracologists, Elementalists, Illusionists, Necromancers, Cryptomancers (runemasters), and Witches. Ken Rolston commented that "Glantri City is the best-developed AD&D or D&D game city" he had seen, with the exception of Lankhmar as presented in TSR's Lankhmar: City of Adventure, noting that his favorite part is the similarity to Venice: "Glantri City has canals rather than streets, and travel is by bridge, gondola, or private boat".

=== Principalities ===
- Aalban
- Belcadiz
- Bergdhoven
- Blackhill (destroyed by a meteor 1006 AC)
- Boldavia
- Bramyra
- Caurenze (also destroyed by the meteor 1006 AC)
- Erewan
- Fenswick
- Klantyre
- Krondahar
- New Kolland
- Morlay-Malinbois
- Nouvelle Averoigne
- Sablestone

== History ==
The Highlands, which was the original name of the region, were settled before the Great Rain of Fire. The first settlers were elves, but they were forced to flee, or were destroyed, in the wake of the great cataclysm. The extraplanar Flaems came next, a people that shows a notable affinity with the energies of Fire. The Flaems founded seven duchies in the region, and clashed with their neighbors from the plains of Ethengar.

In time, other colonists arrived: first elves, then humans from Thyatis and Traladara and even Alphatia, then dwarves from Rockhome. Other, more mysterious, colonists came in through magical ways, such as the Klantyrians and the Averoignians.

The Flaems resented the intrusion. The colonists fought back, until the distant Empire of Alphatia tried to take control of the region, with the help of dwarven colonists. The humans and elves allied with the Flaems, chased the Alphatian troops and their dwarven allies and founded a Republic, which later took its name from the most prominent war hero, Alexander Glantri.

A council of hereditary Princes and a parliament of minor nobles rule Glantri, as it is no longer a true Republic.

== Population ==
There are several distinct human cultures present in Glantri, including those found in the individual principalities, such as the Caurenzans, the Alphatians of Blackhill, the Aalbanese, the Flaems, the Ethengarians of Krondahar, the Averoignians, the Klantyrians, and the Boldavians.

Two different clans of elves, the Erewan and the Belcadiz, live in the southernmost Principalities, and a number of unusual creatures can be found within the borders of Glantri. Lupins of various breeds and a few rakasta and goblinoids complete the population. No dwarf or halfling resides in the Principalities, since the local law hunts down these demihuman people.

Most of these ethnic groups are fiercely regional when domestic matters are concerned, but cooperate when facing an external enemy such as Alphatia, dwarves, Ethengar, or the goblinoids.

== Government and religion ==
A Council of Princes rules the Principalities of Glantri. When a decision cannot be taken, due to the lack of a clear majority, the issue is brought to the Parliament, an assembly where each noble has voting power proportioned to his title.

The head of state is the Chancellor of the Princes, which is currently Prince Volospin Aendyr of Blackhill. However, in the Glantrian mindset Étienne d'Ambreville, the Headmaster of the Great School of Magic, the foremost center of magical training and research, has more authority, and he has a higher power in votes. A large bureaucracy works to enact the rulings of the Council and Parliament, while nobles maintain nearly complete authority in their fiefs.

No Immortals are openly worshipped in this land, and, moreover, clerics are outlawed. Only some forms of mysticism, like the worship of Magic itself preached by the Shepherds of Rad, or the reclusive mystics of Lhamsa, are allowed.
