= The Complete Wizard's Handbook =

- Author: Rick Swan
- Genre: Role-playing game
- Publisher: TSR
- Publication date: 1990
- Pages: 128

The Complete Wizard's Handbook is a supplementary rulebook published in 1990 for the 2nd edition of the Advanced Dungeons & Dragons fantasy role-playing game. Accompanying manuals are The Complete Fighter's Handbook, Priest's Handbook, and Thief's Handbook.

== Contents ==
The Complete Wizard's Handbook is a rules supplement to the 2nd edition Player's Handbook that details magician characters, including their school of magic, their wizard kit subclass, and their career, and the book also includes new spells, and more rules for spells.

The book introduced the wizard kit, a character package for a wizard with role-playing hooks linked to game benefits and limitations. Each kit is built around one recognizable stereotype of a fantasy spell-caster. Examples include the Academician, who suffers a penalty to attack rolls because he lacks a killer instinct, but his scholarly reputation earns him positive reaction bonuses when he meets fellows in his field; the Anagokok, a primitive wizard from a frigid or equatorial climate, who suffers penalties when in a hostile environment, but in his home climate he is masterful, capable of finding food and water in even the most desolate lands, and hardy enough to endure the most brutal weather conditions; and other kits such as the Amazon Sorceress and the Witch.

This book also presents these wizards with the option to specialize in one of eight schools of magic from the Player's Handbook. Specialists accept limitations on the variety of spells they can learn in order to gain benefits in casting spells in their areas of specialization. Specialists always have one more spell slot than generalist mages, so long as the extra spell slot is occupied by a spell from the wizard's area of specialization. The book discusses the pros and cons of selecting a generalist mage or a specialist wizard, observing that in short campaigns with slow advancement the specialist benefits are most significant. At higher levels, the modest benefits are overshadowed by abilities gained by level advancement.

The Complete Wizard's Handbook also details new official spells. An entire chapter is devoted to a discussion of role-playing and various wizard-character stereotypes, and a "Wizardly Lists" miscellany is included at the end of the book. Other sections detailed in the book include "Combat and the Wizard" and "Spell Commentary".

== Publication history ==
PHBR4 The Complete Wizard's Handbook was written by Rick Swan and published by TSR in 1990 as a 128-page book. Editing was done by Anne Brown.

== Reception ==
Stewart Wieck reviewed the module in the October/November 1990 issue of White Wolf Magazine. He stated that "Other than some good information about campaign play, the rest of the material is of questionable quality and usefulness", while noting some of the material was of poor quality. He added that, "even at its worst, the material is readable and will probably hold the attention of a significant portion of the readers".

Ken Rolston reviewed The Complete Wizard's Handbook for Dragon magazine #169 (May 1991). He praised the addition of two strong and well developed female roles (the Amazon Sorceress and the Witch), and highlighted the "deliciously obscure and distinctive" Anagokok character. Conversely, he criticized the role-playing material as for not being written in a way that would be of immediate use for players, and the "Wizardly Lists" miscellany to be a "sign of incomplete and careless development" as the ideas deserved a fuller treatment. Ultimately, while he criticized some of the material as "bland and unexciting" and of variable use, he deemed it a "must have" for the wizard kits and new spells. However, he did not consider it Rick Swan's best work and noted that "some of the handbook lacks the elegant polish and conviction of the AD&D 2nd Edition Player's Handbook and Dungeon Master's Guide".

== Reviews ==
- Casus Belli #59
- Casus Belli #82
