= The Kingdom of Ierendi =

Tabletop role-playing game supplement for Dungeons & Dragons

- Author: Anne Gray McCready
- Genre: Role-playing game
- Publisher: TSR
- Publication date: 1987
- Pages: 64

The Kingdom of Ierendi is an accessory for the Dungeons & Dragons fantasy role-playing game.

== Contents ==
The Kingdom of Ierendi is a campaign setting supplement which presents the island archipelago of Ierendi, populated by pirates but which tries to appear to outsiders as a tropical paradise.

The Kingdom of Ierendi is the fourth in the series of Gazetteers detailing the D&D game world, providing a tour of the Ierendi Isles. The gazetteer details the history, politics, and economics of Ierendi, and also includes a simple board game for resolving large naval conflicts. Plot outlines for all levels of play are sprinkled liberally throughout the text.

== Publication history ==
GAZ4 The Kingdom of Ierendi was written by Anne Gray McCready, with a cover by Clyde Caldwell and interior illustrations by Stephen Fabian, and was published by TSR in 1987 as a 64-page booklet with a counter sheet, a large color map, and an outer folder.

== Reception ==
Jim Bambra briefly reviewed The Kingdom of Ierendi for Dragon magazine #132 (April 1988). Bambra described this gazetteer as "a colorful tour of the paradise of the Ierendi Isles", and felt that the plot outlines provided make the Islands "an ideal playground for any party. Whether you're looking for a new setting or simply skimming for new ideas, Ierendi has lots to recommend it."

In his 1991 book Heroic Worlds, Lawrence Schick calls The Kingdom of Ierendi "Perhaps the least credible of the GAZ series."
