= Dungeon Master's Design Kit =

Tabletop role-playing game supplement

- Author: Harold Johnson and Aaron Allston
- Genre: Role-playing game
- Publisher: TSR
- Publication date: 1988

Dungeon Master's Design Kit is an accessory for the Advanced Dungeons & Dragons fantasy role-playing game.

== Contents ==
Dungeon Master's Design Kit is an aid for Dungeon Masters (DMs), with advice and tables for creating different kinds of adventure scenarios.

Book I: Adventure Design includes information on creating an adventure scenario and demonstrates with a brief sample scenario. Book II: Forms Book includes a number of different types of blank design forms. Book III: Adventure Cookbook contains ideas to inspire the creation of settings, and plots for adventures. This book identifies and discusses many of the conventional plot, characterization, and thematic features of the fantasy role-playing game genre.

== Publication history ==
The Dungeon Master's Design Kit was designed by Harold Johnson and Aaron Allston, with a cover by Keith Parkinson and interior illustrations by George Barr. It was published by TSR in 1988 as three 32-page books and an outer folder. It was edited by Christopher Mortika.

== Reception ==
Ken Rolston reviewed Dungeon Master's Design Kit for Dragon magazine in July 1991. He began his review by expressing his disappointment, saying, "the Dungeon Master's Design Kit is based on the use of scads of fill-in-the-blanks forms." He felt that while the forms are "useful reminders of all the details that may be needed in an adventure design," they seem to imply that the Dungeon Master should plan and record all those details before running an adventure even when "no one method of planning and recording details will be satisfactory for all, or even many, DMs". He also said that "Almost any instinctive narrative impulse is likely to produce a more lively adventure than following the suggested procedures in this kit." Rolston found the Adventure Cookbook to be the most interesting reading, but said that while newer DMs would find it worthwhile, more experienced ones would find the book too remedial and boring. He considered the later Campaign Sourcebook and Catacomb Guide to be a better DM aid in general, one that gives DMs the ability to create rather than just presenting lists of ideas. Rolston concluded the review by stating: "This supplement is nonessential. Exceptionally organized and compulsive DMs who love forms and summary sheets may find it exciting, and some of the plot, setting, and character-building tips could be useful to a DM trying to improve his adventure design. Instinctive or veteran DMs don't usually have the problems this book tries to solve. If you are having trouble designing or organizing your own adventures, however, you might give this a try."

Lawrence Schick, in his 1991 book Heroic Worlds, noted the similarities of some of the forms in Forms Book to the ones in Wilmark Dynasty's Roomscapes, and called Adventure Design and Adventure Cookbook "quite good".

== Reviews ==
- Casus Belli #51
