= Dawn of the Emperors: Thyatis and Alphatia =

Tabletop role-playing game supplement for Dungeons & Dragons

- Author: Aaron Allston
- Genre: Role-playing game
- Publisher: TSR
- Publication date: 1989
- Media type: Boxed set
- ISBN: 0-88038-736-X

Dawn of the Emperors: Thyatis and Alphatia is an accessory for the Dungeons & Dragons fantasy role-playing game.

== Contents ==
Dawn of the Emperors is a campaign setting which details the warring empires of Thyatis and Alphatia.

The 32-page "Player's Guide to Thyatis" details an empire similar to ancient Rome and includes character creation rules for Thyatian player characters.

The 32-page "Player's Guide to Alphatia" describes an ancient empire ruled by magic-users over all non-magic users, and book includes rules for creating Alphatian characters, and how to make magic items.

The 128-page "The Dungeon Master's Sourcebook" provides both a history and an atlas for the two featured empires, and describes territories disputed between them, also including suggestions for campaigns and adventure scenarios, and rules for converting the set to Advanced Dungeons & Dragons.

== Publication history ==
Dawn of the Emperors - Thyatis and Alphatia was written by Aaron Allston, with a cover by Clyde Caldwell and interior illustrations by Stephen Fabian, and was published by TSR in 1989 as a boxed set containing a 128-page book, two 32-page books, and two large color maps.

== Reception ==
In the January 1990 edition of Games International (Issue 12), although Steve Jones had some quibbles with several of the rules, he concluded "I was pleasantly surprised by this campaign pack."

In the 1991 book Heroic Worlds: A History and Guide to Role-Playing Games, Lawrence Schick commented, "On the whole, it's a satisfying climax to the GAZ series."
