= The Complete Fighter's Handbook =

Dungeons & Dragons rulebook

- Cover
- Editor: Steve Winter
- Author: Aaron Allston
- Illustrators: Valerie Valusek; John and Laura Lakey; Doug Chaffee; Jeff Easley
- Language: English
- Genre: Role-playing game
- Publisher: TSR
- Publication date: December 1989
- Media type: Print Paperback
- Pages: 128
- ISBN: 0-88038-779-3

The Complete Fighter's Handbook is a supplemental rulebook published in December 1989 for the 2nd edition of the Advanced Dungeons & Dragons fantasy role-playing game. Accompanying manuals are The Complete Thief's Handbook, Priest's Handbook, and Wizard's Handbook.

== Contents ==
The Complete Fighter's Handbook is a rules supplement for the 2nd edition Player's Handbook. The book examines the fighter class in detail, and a variety of subclasses. The book introduced the concept of character "kits," or thematic templates, to the game.

== Publication history ==
PHBR1 The Complete Fighter's Handbook was written by Aaron Allston, edited by Steve Winter, includes black & white art by Valerie Valusek, colour art by John and Laura Lakey, Doug Chaffee and Jeff Easley, typography by Angelika Lokotz, and was published by TSR in 1989 as a 128-page book.

== Reception ==
Jolly R. Blackburn reviewed The Complete Fighter's Handbook and The Complete Thief's Handbook in Shadis #4 and said that "Both books offer a wealth of information. Are they worth the price? I would have to say it depends on the individual and the campaign he is playing in. If you find yourself playing certain character classes to the exclusion of others, then these books would probably be greatly appreciated." Stewart Wieck reviewed the product in a 1990 issue of White Wolf along with the Priest's, Thief's, and Wizard's Handbooks. He stated for the Fighter's Handbook that the "material is all good, but there's simply too much of it. Too many options and too many special case rules."

== Reviews ==
- Dragão Brasil #1 (1994) (Portuguese)
- Casus Belli #55
- Dragão Brasil (as "Livro do Guerreiro")
