= Randy Post =

American illustrator

- Post in 2026
- Known for: Fantasy art

Randy "rk" Post is an American illustrator of fantasy publications.

== Background ==
Post was raised in Illinois on a farm.

Post has done freelance work for TSR, including Red Steel, Cutthroats of Lankhmar, and Spells & Magic. Post garnered a full-time staff illustration position at TSR in September 1996, painting cover illustrations for games and novels. Post soon began working on two projects: the Planescape setting for the Dungeons & Dragons game, and the new Alternity science fiction role-playing game. Post has worked on games and game lines such as Planescape, Deadlands, Alternity, Star Wars, and Vampire.

== Career ==
TSR was purchased by Wizards of the Coast soon after Post was hired. Post had the opportunity to illustrate cards for Magic: the Gathering, and also painted covers for Dungeon magazine. WotC and Post parted for ways in the winter of 2000 and he now doubles as a full-time freelance illustrator still contracting occasional assignments through the subsidiary of Hasbro, Inc., and as a 2D and 3D artist for Gas Powered Games. He finished working full-time as a 3D environmental artist for Sony Online Entertainment in May 2008.

Post was nominated for an ASFA Chesley Award, for Best Gaming-Related Illustration, in 1999 for his work Alternity: Player's Handbook (cover), and again in 2002 for his work "Lightning Angel (card art for Magic: Apocalypse Expansion)".

== Works ==
Randy Post has contracted and work through White Wolf, WizKids, Fanpro, Palladium Books (Palladium Fantasy, Nightbane, Rifts), Microsoft (Mythica, Xbox), LucasFilm, 20th Century Fox (Alien vs Predator), Sega (Dreamcast), Nintendo, Ballantine Books, Science Fiction Book Club, Hasbro (television and animation), Marvel Entertainment, DC Comics, Dark Horse Comics, the History Channel, and Blizzard Ent (Diablo 2, World of Warcraft). rk post has his collected works available in a hard cover art book, "Postmortem: "The Art of rk post" by Cartouche Press.
