= The Complete Ninja's Handbook =

1995 role-playing game supplement

- Cover of the first edition
- Genre: Role-playing game
- Publisher: TSR
- Publication date: 1995
- Media type: Print

The Complete Ninja's Handbook is a supplement to the 2nd edition of the Advanced Dungeons & Dragons fantasy role-playing game.

== Contents ==
The Complete Ninja's Handbook is a 128-page sourcebook which details the ninja class, with optional character class kits to modify the class to have different abilities. The book also presents rules for martial arts abilities, and rules from the original Oriental Adventures book.

== Publication history ==
The Complete Ninja's Handbook was published by TSR, Inc. in 1995.

== Reception ==
Cliff Ramshaw reviewed The Complete Ninja's Handbook for Arcane magazine, rating it an 8 out of 10 overall. Ramshaw comments: "Ninjas are always fascinating. Partly it's a cultural thing, but in part the appeal is egotistical - a player who passes notes back and forth with the referee and who has goals he keeps secret from the rest of the party is bound to feel he's a bit special." He notes that "referees will be glad to know that ninjas aren't as overpowering as some of TSR's previous classes" but that the martial arts system "can be complex". Ramshaw concludes his review by stating: "The handbook gives plenty of good advice on how a ninja can keep his identity hidden from the party. Such secrecy and intrigue might be a pain to referee, but it provides chances for great roleplaying."
