= Wrath of the Immortals =

Tabletop role-playing game supplement for Dungeons & Dragons

- Genre: Role-playing games
- Publisher: TSR
- Publication date: 1992
- Media type: Boxed set

Wrath of the Immortals, written by Aaron Allston, is a boxed set for the Dungeons & Dragons (D&D) fantasy role-playing game first published by TSR in 1992, revising the rules of the Immortals Rules box set that was originally released in 1986.

== Publication history ==
The Dungeons & Dragons Rules Cyclopedia was first published in 1991, compiling and revising the major rules from the Dungeons & Dragons Basic Rules, Expert Rules, Companion Rules, and Master Rules boxed sets. Instead of also adding the major rules from the Immortals Rules box set to the Rules Cyclopedia, TSR published Wrath of the Immortals as a separate product in 1992.

The box set contains two books: the 128-page core rulebook titled Codex of the Immortals and a 96-page campaign setting titled The Immortals' Fury. The set also includes two poster-sized maps that go with the latter book. Both books were written by Aaron Allston, who also worked on the Rules Cyclopedia. Jeff Easley and Terry Dykstra also returned to provide the cover and interior artwork, respectively.

== Contents ==
The first book in the box set, the Codex of the Immortals, contains the revised rules on supporting Immortals. The book's introduction lists some of the major rule changes from the Immortals Rules box set, also noting that these rules also supplant those in the Rules Cyclopedia regarding immortals. The book also contains an overview of all the immortal NPCs in the Known World (Mystara) and Hollow World campaign settings.

The second book, The Immortals' Fury, is a campaign saga set in the Known World (Mystara) and Hollow World settings. The Dungeon Master is warned that the adventure "will result in catastrophic alterations to the world's surface ... [and] the Hollow World setting, as well". It also provides a detailed, updated timeline of Mystara that was first presented in both the Gazetteers series and the Hollow World box set, both ret-conning related past events as well as listing events that result because of the adventure (as well as how the player characters interact in these changing events). It is split into three major parts: Phase One, designed for characters of level 1–5, and taking place four years after the "present time" depicted in the Gazetteers; Phase Two, to be played when the player characters are at least at level 6, and between five and six years after the "present time"; and Phase Three, when the player characters are at least at level 16, and roughly seven years after the "present time". In Phase One, the player characters explore a castle in which they eventually find a being trapped in an artifact, who, after being rescued, becomes a powerfully ally. In Phase Two, all the nations of the Known World are preparing to war with each other, and the being that was previously rescued asks the player characters to find evidence that Immortals are behind these events. In Phase Three, when all the nations are at war, the player characters discover the Immortals' plans and attempt to stop it.

One of the two maps in the box set depicts the Known World before the events of The Immortals' Fury, and the other map depicts the changed world in its aftermath.

== Reviews ==
- Casus Belli #74
