= First Quest =

Role-playing game accessory

- Genre: Role-playing games
- Publisher: TSR
- Publication date: 1994

First Quest is an accessory for the Dungeons & Dragons fantasy role-playing game, published in 1994.

== Contents ==
First Quest, subtitled "The Introduction to Role-Playing Games", is a boxed set intended for players who have no experience with role-playing games, to help them learn the basics of Advanced Dungeons & Dragons and about role-playing generally. First Quest comes with an audio compact disc, complete with 60 tracks, stereo sound and a plastic case. The CD begins with a long track which introduces roleplaying as an idea, where the narrator helps a group of young gamers act out a short sample roleplaying session. The adventure text directs the Dungeon Master to play certain tracks at various points to reveal clues or enhance the atmosphere. The rules are streamlined AD&D rules, intended for novice players and first-time Dungeon Masters (DM). The 16-page rule book covers the basics of character creation, combat and spell-casting. The Adventure Book contains four scenarios, two of which use the CD. Symbols highlight key sections of the text; an exclamation point indicates information requiring the DM's scrutiny, a foot impaled on a spike notes the location of a trap. The DM's screen provides step-by-step directions for making saving throws and ability checks. A set of reference cards explains the differences between warriors and wizards.

== Publication history ==
The First Quest game was designed by Bruce Nesmith, L. Richard Baker III, and David "Zeb" Cook, and published by TSR, Inc.

== Reception ==
Rick Swan reviewed First Quest for Dragon magazine #210 (October 1994). He called the audio CD "the genuine article", further commenting: "Tastefully produced, the CD transcends gimmickry by transforming routine adventures into multimedia extravaganzas". Swan concludes that although the First Quest game "won't sustain the interest of experienced players—it only takes characters up to 3rd level and doesn't have enough detail to stage convincing wilderness adventures—it's a newcomer's dream. This may be the birthday present of the year".

Scott Haring reviewed First Quest for Pyramid #11 (January/February 1995). He called this "a natural first product" as an experimental application of a relatively new technology in the form of boxed sets that included audio CDs, adding that this is "the Holy Grail of RPG game design – the game that teaches itself – and First Quest is the closest anyone has come to it yet". Describing the introduction track, Haring states: "The kids sounds like kids – they interrupt each other, talk in the background, laugh at stupid jokes and have fun. The script writers did a good job of making this sample session sound real, not like some wooden radio play".

== Reviews ==
- Dragão Brasil (issue #4 – July 1995) (Portuguese)
- Dragão Brasil #10
- Rollespilsmagasinet Fønix (Danish) (issue #4 – September/October 1994)
- Coleção Dragon Slayer
