= Fred Fields =

American artist

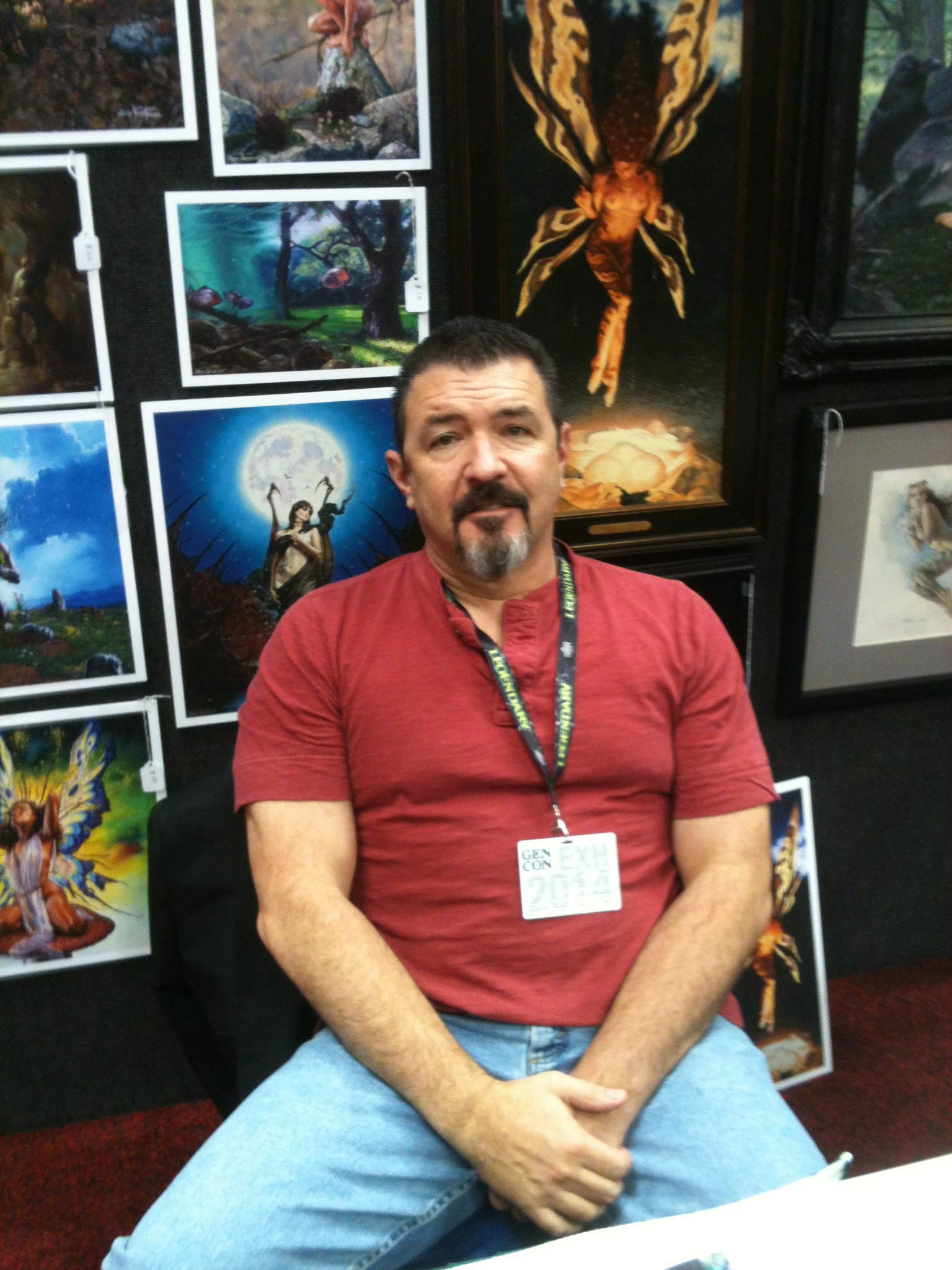
- Born: Kentucky, United States
- Known for: Fantasy art

Fred Fields is an American artist whose work has appeared largely in the Dungeons & Dragons fantasy role-playing game from TSR.

== Biography ==
Fred Fields was born in northern Kentucky. He grew up in the small town of Burlington, Kentucky. Fields wanted to be an artist since childhood: "I don't know that becoming an artist is a decision you can make... I've been drawing since before I can remember, and I started painting at age nine. I used to do all these monsters and stuff, and my mom was frankly a little concerned about it. Now that I'm making a living at it, I think mom's OK with it. My parents always encouraged me to draw and do what I wanted with it. They've always been 100% behind me." Fields attended the Central Academy of Commercial Art in Cincinnati, and moved to Chicago after graduation. He worked there for about a year in advertising, producing illustrations and concept sketches for both television commercials and print ads. He worked at Leo Burnett Advertising in Chicago as a storyboard comp artist.

Fields continued painting on his own time, and began sending out samples of his work; Dragon magazine was among the clients those who were interested in his work. Fields painted his first cover for Dragon in 1988, for issue #142. He applied to TSR's art department soon after and was hired. "I went from freelancing, completely on my own, to sitting in a room with the likes of Clyde Caldwell, Brom, Tony Szczudlo, Robh Ruppel, Dana Knutson, Randy Post, and Todd Lockwood. I just sort of stopped and thought, 'Wow, I've arrived.'" Fields worked on scenes from worlds such as Forgotten Realms, and even Ravenloft, saying "It was fun doing the Gothic horror stuff. In some cases, I think I took it further than other artists. I put a lot more blood in there."

His work was represented in the 1996 collection The Art of TSR: Colossal Cards. Critic Joseph Szadkowski of The Washington Times singled out Fields's work "Dragon Claw" as "stunning", and later named the collection as the year's "Best Trading Card Release Based on Fantasy Art". Archangel Entertainment released a book of his artwork in 1999, entitled The Art of Fred Fields.

In May 2010, artwork by Fields appeared as part of the "Lucid Daydreams" Exhibition at Gallery Provocateur in Chicago.

== Works ==
Fred Fields has had his art appear in various Dungeons & Dragons game supplements and their associated novels throughout the 1990s, as well as in other games such as Shadowrun. His artwork has appeared on numerous D&D covers, such as Greyhawk Ruins and Book of Artifacts.

Fields has illustrated cards for the Magic: The Gathering collectible card game.
