= Rogues to Riches =

Rogues to Riches is a fantasy novel by J. Robert King, in the "First Quest" series, and based on the Dungeons & Dragons game.

== Plot summary ==
Rogues to Riches is a novel in which teenage rogues Tooles and Rengie steal a magic rose that compels them to go on a quest to save a beautiful princess.

== Reviews ==
- Kliatt
- Review by Carolyn Cushman (1995) in Locus, #408 January 1995
