= Saving throw =

Character game mechanic

In role-playing games (RPGs) and war games, a saving throw is a roll of dice used to determine whether magic, poison, or various other types of attacks are effective against a character or monster. The term was first used in Donald F. Featherstone's book "War Games".

They are used to represent the character's ability to avoid or resist the threat, such as by dodging a trap, or being able to resist the effects of a poison. For this reason, they are often modified by appropriate attributes such as Dexterity, Constitution, Wisdom or Luck. Sometimes the throw also represents the chance of penetrating the armor being worn by the character/unit, and so players can either roll for an 'armor save' (as is often the case), or for the unit's 'ward save' or 'invulnerability save' if applicable (this is most notable in Warhammer Fantasy and Warhammer 40,000). Magical equipment or spells can also modify saving throw values. A successful saving throw typically either negates or reduces the effectiveness of what is being saved against.

Saving throws are represented as a numeric value that often changes as the character advances in experience. In order to successfully make a throw, the character must roll dice (often a single 20-sided die ("d20") or three six-sided dice ("3d6")), achieving a result based on the calculated value of the saving throw which is compared against a success value. Under different RPG systems, the roll and/or the success value may have modifiers added or subtracted to determine the outcome.

A gamemaster may also allow a bonus on saving rolls to players who come up with creative ways for their characters to protect themselves.

Some games achieve a similar randomised result by use of other mechanisms including drawing cards, simple contests of luck, or use of tables of random results.
