= Undead (Dungeons & Dragons) =

Dungeons & Dragons creature type

In the Dungeons & Dragons fantasy role-playing game, the undead are a broad classification of monsters that can be encountered by player characters. Undead creatures are most often once-living creatures, which have been animated by spiritual or supernatural forces. They range from mindless remnants of corpses such as skeletons and zombies to highly intelligent creatures like vampires and liches, but in whatever form they take they are typically malevolent and threatening. Like most Dungeons & Dragons monsters, the various kinds of undead creatures are "drawn from classical, medieval, and fictional sources", and have in turn influenced the use of these kinds of monsters in other games.

== History ==
The word "undead" was first popularized by Bram Stoker's 1897 novel Dracula, referring to the vampire, and "over time its attendant meaning has broadened to encompass all manner of creatures seen to be conceptually related, such as zombies or ghosts". The modern development of the undead as "a very specific type of monster, with solidly established traits" has been credited to the use of these creatures in role-playing games, "which necessitate clarification of otherwise intangible ideas as a requirement of game mechanics". As one analysis notes:

While variation is extremely common, many follow the concepts promulgated by the seminal role-playing game, Dungeons & Dragons, model, with the undead as a precise classification of monster, being in some way the returned spirit or body of a dead creature retaining some aspect of the living, such as motion, speech, intelligence, hunger, etc. Such classifications of the undead thus tend to have certain specific commonalities, such as immunity to poisons and natural events, a general vulnerability to sunlight, ability to be repelled by holy symbols, and a host of other collective traits.

Undead creatures have been part of the game since its earliest forms. The skeleton and the zombie, for example, were among the first monsters introduced in the earliest edition of the game, in the Dungeons & Dragons "white box" set (1974), where both were described as acting under the instructions of their motivator, usually a magic-user or cleric of chaotic alignment. The vampire, introduced in the same set, were described simply as powerful undead. Vampires were further detailed in Supplement I: Greyhawk (1975). Other undead monsters from that set include the ghoul, described as being able to paralyze anyone they touch, the mummy, described as having a touch that causes a rotting disease. the wight, described as being able to drain away energy levels on a touch, and the wraith, described as high-class wights with more mobility. Also introduced in that set, the spectre was described as having no corporeal body, being able to drain life energy levels, and identified with Tolkien's Ringwraiths. The ghost first appeared in a 1975 issue of the official newsletter of TSR Games, The Strategic Review.

In the game's third edition, "Undead" became a "creature type". All undead in this edition have darkvision out to sixty feet. Undead have a wide array of immunities, including being immune to: all mind-affecting effects, poison, sleep effects, paralysis, stunning, disease, and death effects. They are also not subject to critical hits, nonlethal damage, ability drain, or energy drain. Most Dungeons & Dragons undead can be "turned" (driven away) or destroyed by a good cleric, and rebuked (forced to cower) or bolstered by an evil cleric. In the game's fourth edition, "Undead" is a keyword, rather than a creature type. Later editions of the game introduced the ability of players to play as necromancers, able to create their own undead forces for support in battle.

== Functionality ==
Undead creatures are an embodiment of the presence of death in the game. The most common types are mindless or near-mindless, and are therefore directed to act either by the control of a more powerful enemy, or acting on instinctive compulsions. On the other end of the spectrum, the most powerful kinds of undead creatures are highly intelligent and cunning, with an array of magical abilities, representing "some of the strongest creatures in D&D". The primary counter to the undead is the Cleric, a character class that is able to use divine magic to "turn" or take control of the undead. Keith Ammann, in his tactical guide, The Monsters Know What They're Doing, distinguishes the undead from other monster types by noting that living creatures have evolved their characteristic, and behave in manner consistent with evolutionary biology, whereas the undead act in unnatural ways, without necessarily having any regard to self-preservation. Ammann characterizes undeath as a curse, pursuant to which an undead creature is compelled by magic or circumstances to act in accordance with "the particular compulsion that drives it". Environmental humanities scholar Matthew Chrulew observed that undead - next to vermin - "figure the abject and excluded", representing "most clearly a bare life [as coined by Giorgio Agamben] that may be killed without hesitation; violence against such wholly other creatures is completely deproblematized."

While zombies in particular are generally portrayed as supernatural creations, the Advanced Dungeons & Dragons 2nd edition game, however, also incorporated a creature called the yellow musk creeper, a creeping plant that drains the intelligence of its victims, possibly turning them into "zombies" under the plant's control. Ben Woodard found this to be an expression of the "seemingly endless morphology of fungal creep and toxicological capacity" within the game.

== Influence ==
Undead have been considered among "D&D's most classic monsters". The game mechanics of undead creatures in Dungeons & Dragons have influenced the representation of such creatures in other later culture depictions, particularly in video games and other role-playing games.

The existence of the undead as an aspect of the game has been cited by those who oppose Dungeons & Dragons. Philosophers have discussed the morality of necromancy and raising the dead for ostensibly heroic purposes within the context of the game.

== Types ==
- Alhoon: Undead mind flayer. Even more powerful than other illithids because it has developed "powerful sorcery to augment their already fearsome psionic powers".
- Death knight: A "powerful undead warrior" which was first introduced in the original Fiend Folio (1981). Shannon Appelcline considered this creature created by Charles Stross one of the game's especially notable monsters.
- Dracolich: A dragon made even more powerful by transforming into an undead version of itself, which can only be destroyed if "its phylactery is taken to another dimension". Ranked among the strongest monsters in the game by Scott Baird from Screen Rant. It was also one of the first new creatures introduced for the Forgotten Realms campaign setting.
- Ghost: Inspired by Gothic fiction, a typical denizen of the Ravenloft setting.
- Ghoul: Undead with "terrible claws".
- Lich: Emaciated undead spellcaster, a "classic" monster of the game. Demilich: Evolved beyond status as a lich. Creature of enormous powers, where only the skull remains. Tyler Linn of Cracked.com identified the demi-lich as one of "15 Idiotic Dungeons and Dragons Monsters" in 2009, stating: "Besides looking like a Pirates of the Caribbean alarm clock, the Demi-lich seems to possess no tactical advantages of any kind. It just kind of floats around, waiting for a party of heroes to smack it out of the air like a pinata. We suppose it could try to bite you, but the illustration above kind of makes it look like the jaw is fused in place. Man, now we just feel sorry for it." Ranked among the strongest in Screen Rant's "10 Most Powerful (And 10 Weakest) Monsters, Ranked", saying "You might think that a floating skull would be easy to smash to pieces, but you would be wrong, as demiliches are some of the most resilient creatures in the game."
- Mummy: Powerful undead usually from desert areas, wrapped in bandages. Based on the creature from Gothic fiction and appearances in more contemporary entertainment, a typical denizen of the Ravenloft setting. In his review of the Monster Manual in the British magazine White Dwarf #8 (August/September 1978), Don Turnbull noted that the mummy was revised from its previous statistics, and could now cause paralysis on sight (as a result of fear).
- Shadow: In his review of the Monster Manual in the British magazine White Dwarf #8 (August/September 1978), Don Turnbull noted his disappointment that the shadow is of the undead class and thus subject to a cleric's turn undead ability. Turnbull commented, "I used to enjoy seeing clerics vainly trying to turn what wouldn't turn, when Shadows were first met". Rob Bricken of io9 identified the shadow as one of "The 12 Most Obnoxious Dungeons & Dragons Monsters".
- Skeleton: Skeleton of a deceased creature animated as an undead. The skeleton was ranked second among the ten best low-level monsters by the authors of Dungeons & Dragons For Dummies: "introduces players to the special advantages and weaknesses of undead monsters". They also thank Ray Harryhausen for people knowing what fighting skeletons ought to look like. Screen Rant ranked the tiny skeleton one of the weakest D&D creatures, saying "[skeletons] go all the way down to Tiny-sized creatures, which means that it is possible for your party of adventurers to fight a group of skeletons that are the same size as action figures."
- Skeleton warrior: Reviewer Jamie Thomson found the skeleton warriors "beings similar to Tolkien's ringwraiths".
- Spectre: Inspired by Gothic fiction, a typical denizen of the Ravenloft setting.
- Vampire: Depiction is related to those in 1930s and 1940s Hollywood Dracula movies, as well as folklore and Gothic fiction; a typical denizen of the Ravenloft setting and "classic" monster of the game.
- Wight: Thin humanoid undead. Directly adapted from the barrow-wight in Tolkien's The Lord of the Rings, while the concept is inspired Icelandic sagas. Rob Bricken of io9 identified the wight as one of "The 12 Most Obnoxious Dungeons & Dragons Monsters".
- Wraith: Inspired by and renamed from the Nazgul from J. R. R. Tolkien's legendarium, as well as by Gothic fiction, a typical denizen of the Ravenloft setting.
- Zombie: Based on the zombie from folklore as well as more contemporary entertainment.

== See also ==
- Monsters in Dungeons & Dragons
- Skeleton (undead)#Games
- Vampires in popular culture#Role playing games
- Zombie#Games
