= Ann Dupuis =

Game designer

- Occupations: Owner of Grey Ghost Press and Game Designer

Ann Dupuis is the owner of Grey Ghost Press and designer of a number of GURPS supplements.

== Career ==
Dupuis began working as a game designer in 1991, first working on GURPS books for Steve Jackson Games. Dupuis also did some design work for TSR's Dungeons & Dragons game (Night Howlers, the Poor Wizard's Almanac series, and Joshuan's Almanac & Book of Facts).

Dupuis spent time working on the Fudge RPG system by her friend Steffan O'Sullivan, and her promotion of the system and encouragement for O'Sullivan's 1995 revision contributed to Fudge's popularity. Dupuis created her company as Wild Mule Games in 1994, intending to use Fudge as her core game, and the following year she incorporated her company as Ghostdancer Press, and then renamed the company to Grey Ghost Press. Her book Another Fine Mess was nominated for an Origins award.

Dupuis has worked at the computer software company ResearchWare, providing software testing, documentation, and technical support for HyperRESEARCH since the company was incorporated in 1991, and she also manages the company's administrative side.

Dupuis also works as a certified professional dog trainer and behavior consultant for her company Your Dream Dog.
