= The Grand Duchy of Karameikos =

Tabletop role-playing game supplement for Dungeons & Dragons

- Cover art by Clyde Caldwell
- Author: Aaron Allston
- Genre: Role-playing game
- Publisher: TSR
- Publication date: 1987
- Pages: 64

The Grand Duchy of Karameikos (product code GAZ1) is an supplement published by TSR in 1987 for the Basic Set of Dungeons & Dragons fantasy role-playing game.

== Contents ==
The Grand Duchy of Karameikos is a booklet that details the fictional feudal nation of Karameikos, which is the setting for four D&D modules: B6 The Veiled Society, B10 Night's Dark Terror, X10 Red Arrow, Black Shield, and X12 Skarda's Mirror.

The first section describes the realm of Karameikos within the D&D world, and provides information that player characters native to the area would know. Special attention is given to the city of Threshold. A system for converting player characters into natives of the region is also detailed. In addition, a system of skills is set out.

The second section of the booklet, "Gazetteer", details the history of the region, as well as its politics, society, a description of its geography and some mention of the main cities. Notable non-player characters (NPCs) and monsters that may be encountered there are also described.

The final section of the book, "Adventures", gives gamemasters some story hooks and ideas for adventures in this region.

== Publication history ==
In an attempt to broaden the popularity of D&D's Mystara campaign setting, TSR published a series of 14 gazetteers between 1987 and 1991, each focused on a different region. The first, released in 1987, was GAZ1 The Grand Duchy of Karameikos, a 64-page booklet written by Aaron Allston that came with a large color map and an outer folder, with cover art by Clyde Caldwell and interior art by Stephen Fabian.

== Reception ==
In Issue 41 of the French games magazine Casus Belli, Pierre Rosenthal was very positive, writing, "More than a monolithic box, the booklet allows you to discover very coherent and different worlds. Furthermore, despite great attention to detail, there are enough blank spaces and tracks to leave room for the Dungeon Master's imagination." Rosenthal concluded by calling this product "A great success."

The French RPG magazine La Gazette du Donjon wrote "This superb gaming accessory is very rich. Discovering the grand duchy is a real pleasure. The summaries are short, yes, but developed enough to inspire any Dungeon Master." The magazine concluded by giving this supplement a rating of 5 out of a 5, saying, "A very good supplement for Dungeons & Dragons, surely the best at the time."

Writing a retrospective review for OD&Dities, R.E.B. Tongue noted, "This gazetteer was the first of its kind, and is an excellent item ... The description of Karameikos is excellent, with great detail despite the shortness of the book." Tongue liked the descriptions of the high-level NPCs, but wished there could have been some low-level personalities detailed as well. Tongue also questioned the skill system presented in this book, commenting, "This system of skills is, however, somewhat brief, with few examples mentioned. If it being used with other Gazetteers or with the D&D Cyclopedia, then this is not so much of a problem, but if used alone needs more work." Tongue concluded by giving this book a rating of 9.5 out of 10, saying, "If you [are planning] to set a campaign in Mystara, then this product is essential, being an excellent starting place for PCs, from which they can explore the rest of the world. However, due to its very nature it is somewhat provincial, and high-level PCs will find little to do here."
