= Aaron Allston =

American science fiction writer and game designer (1960–2014)

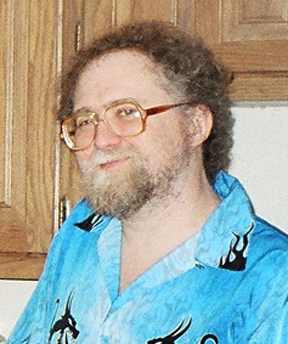
- Aaron Allston in 2005.
- Born: December 8, 1960; Corsicana, Texas, U.S.
- Died: February 27, 2014 (aged 53); Springfield, Missouri, U.S.
- Resting place: Oakwood Cemetery (Corsicana, Texas)
- Occupations: Writer, game designer
- Writing career
- Genres: Tabletop role-playing games, fantasy, science fiction

Aaron Dale Allston (December 8, 1960 – February 27, 2014) was an American game designer and author of many science fiction books, notably Star Wars novels. His works as a game designer include game supplements for role-playing games, several of which served to establish the basis for products and subsequent development of TSR's Dungeons & Dragons game setting Mystara. His later works as a novelist include those of the X-Wing series: Wraith Squadron, Iron Fist, Solo Command, Starfighters of Adumar, and Mercy Kill. He wrote two entries in the New Jedi Order series: Enemy Lines I: Rebel Dream and Enemy Lines II: Rebel Stand. Allston wrote three of the nine Legacy of the Force novels: Betrayal, Exile, and Fury, and three of the nine Fate of the Jedi novels: Outcast, Backlash, and Conviction.

== Early life and education ==
Allston was born December 8, 1960, in Corsicana, Texas, to Tom Dale Allston and Rose Binford Boehm. Allston moved all over Texas in his youth and graduated from high school in Denton. An avid fan of science fiction from an early age, by high school he was the secretary and reporter for his high school science fiction club. Allston moved to Austin in 1979 and attended the University of Texas.

== Career ==
Allston was a circulation manager, assistant editor, and editor of Space Gamer magazine, and by 1983 was a full-time freelance game designer. He served as editor of Space Gamer from issues 52 (June 1982) to 65 (September/October 1983), and as editor of Fantasy Gamer for the first issue (August/September 1983) and co-editor of the second issue (December/January 1984). During Allston's tenure as editor, Space Gamer won the H.G. Wells Award for Best Professional Role-Playing Magazine in 1982. Allston authored the book Autoduel Champions in 1983, which crossed over Champions by Hero Games and Car Wars by Steve Jackson Games. Allston helped launch the Fantasy Gamer spinoff magazine. He co-wrote the computer game Savage Empire, which Game Player magazine named the Best PC Fantasy RPG in 1990. He authored the Rules Cyclopedia (1991), a revision and compilation for the Dungeons & Dragons game. He branched into fiction, and in the mid-1990s wrote five novels.

He began writing for the Star Wars X-Wing series in 1997, when the primary sequence writer Michael Stackpole could not handle the entire workload. Allston produced a new edition of Champions for Hero Games in 2002. In 2006, he launched The Legacy of the Force series with a hardcover entitled Betrayal.

In 2005, Allston made his directorial debut on the independent film Deadbacks, which he also wrote and produced. The film went into post-production but was never released.

Allston lived in Round Rock, Texas. For a short time, he worked for the Austin American-Statesman newspaper.

== Health issues and death ==
In early April 2009 Allston had a heart attack and underwent an emergency quadruple bypass surgery, while on the book signing tour for Outcast, the first book in the Fate of the Jedi series.

On February 27, 2014, Allston collapsed during an appearance at VisionCon in Branson, Missouri, apparently from heart failure. He died later that day in Springfield, Missouri, at the age of 53.

== Selected bibliography ==
=== Stand-alone titles ===
- Web of Danger (1988)
- Galatea in 2-D (1993)
- Double Jeopardy (1994)
- Thunder of the Captains (with H. Lisle) (1996)
- Wrath of the Princes (with H. Lisle) (1997)

==== Doc Sidhe ====
- Doc Sidhe (1995)
- Sidhe-Devil (2001)

=== Star Wars ===
==== X-Wing ====
- Wraith Squadron (1998)
- Iron Fist (1998)
- Solo Command (1999)
- Starfighters of Adumar (1999)
- Mercy Kill (2012)

==== The New Jedi Order ====
- Enemy Lines I: Rebel Dream (2002)
- Enemy Lines II: Rebel Stand (2002)

==== Legacy of the Force ====
- Betrayal (2006)
- Exile (2007)
- Fury (2007)

==== Fate of the Jedi ====
- Outcast (2009)
- Backlash (2010)
- Conviction (2011)

=== Terminator 3: Rise Of The Machines ===
- Terminator Dreams (2003)
- Terminator Hunt (2004)

=== Role-playing games ===
- The Circle and M.E.T.E. (1983)
- Autoduel Champions (1983)
- Lands of Mystery (1985)
- Treasure Hunt (1986)
- GAZ1: The Grand Duchy of Karameikos (1987)
- Mythic Greece (Rolemaster) (1988)
- Strike Force (1988)
- GURPS Supers School of Hard Knocks (1989)
- Dungeon Master's Design Kit (1988)
- The Complete Fighter's Handbook (1989)
- Dawn of the Emperors: Thyatis and Alphatia (1989)
- Ninja Hero (1990)
- Hollow World Campaign Set (1990)
- Dungeons & Dragons Rules Cyclopedia (1991)
- Poor Wizard's Almanac & Book of Facts (1992)
- Wrath of the Immortals (1992)
- The Complete Ninja's Handbook (1995)
- I, Tyrant (1996)
- Champions, Fifth Edition (2002)

=== Short story anthologies ===
- 2013 A Hero by Any Other Name (Short story anthology edited by Jean Rabe)

== Sources ==
- Appelcline, Shannon (2011). Designers & Dragons. Mongoose Publishing. ISBN 978-1-907702-58-7.
