= Bruce Heard =

Game designer

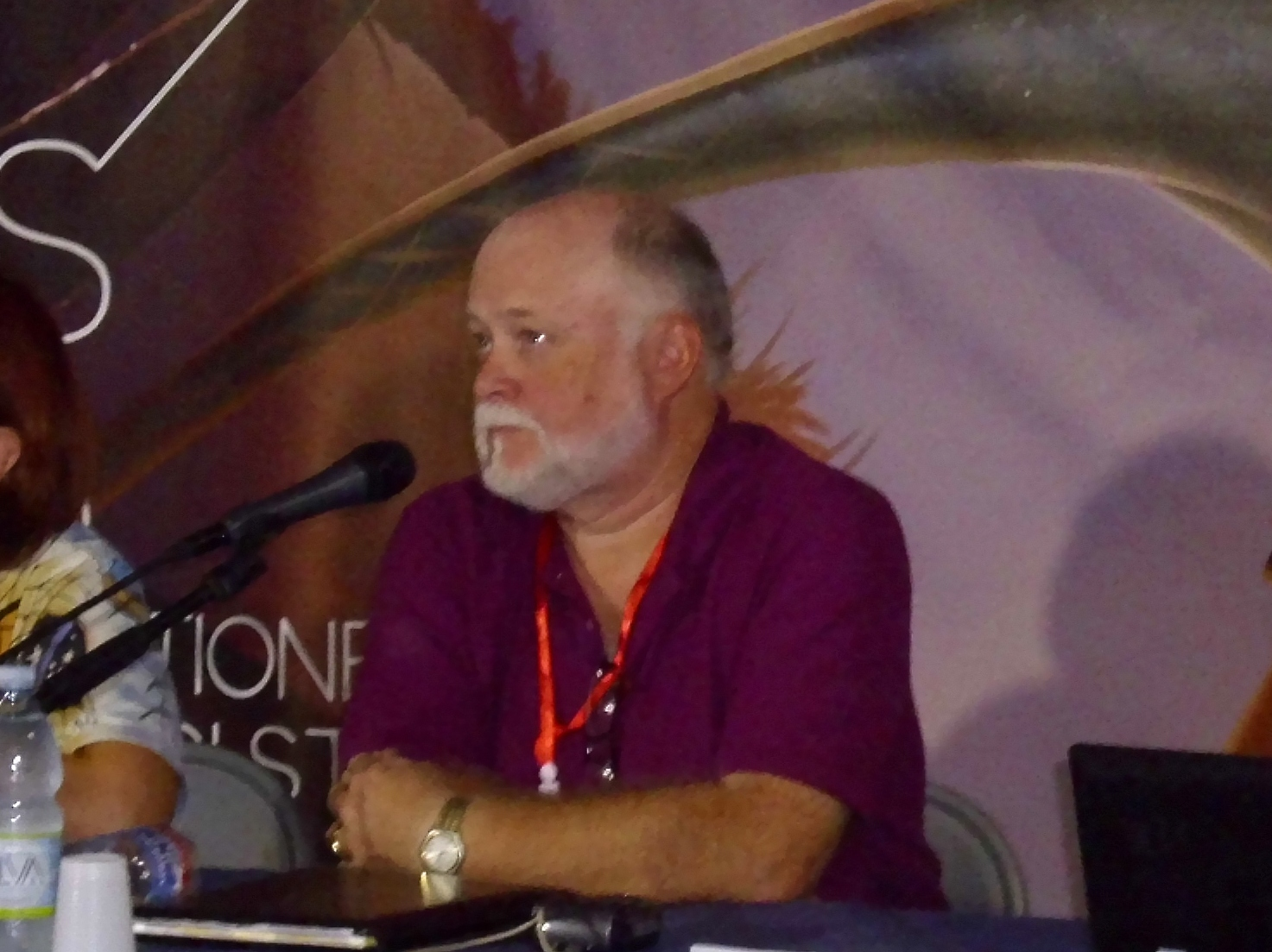
- Heard in 2013
- Born: March 9, 1957 (age 69); Nice, France
- Occupations: Game designer, fiction writer
- Writing career
- Genre: Role-playing games

Bruce Heard (born March 9, 1957) is a game designer, and an author of several products for the Dungeons & Dragons fantasy role-playing game from TSR.

== Early life ==
Heard was born in Nice, France, on March 9, 1957, to his French mother and U.S. Navy officer father. "I grew up in France, England, Morocco, Washington, DC, and Dallas, all before I started school. I speak French, English, Spanish, Portuguese, and a little German," he said. Returning to Nice for his education, he graduated from the lycée (high school) in 1977; "I got passionately interested in wargames when I was attending the Lycée ... primarily in Avalon Hill games like Kriegspiel, Luftwaffe, Third Reich, and Panzer Leader—the classics. There were, of course, no French editions of these games at the time, so we all had to learn the American versions." Heard loved to travel, so he studied hotel management and worked as a concierge in both France and San Francisco.

== Career ==
While living in San Francisco, Heard discovered the Dungeons & Dragons Basic Set, and when he returned to Paris, he joined his first regular Dungeons & Dragons (D&D) group. "I started writing articles on D&D and AD&D for a French gaming magazine, and there learned that TSR was looking for a translator to translate the games into French. Well, I spoke and wrote both languages, and I knew the games, so I wrote a letter to Gary Gygax. By coincidence, he was just about to come to Paris on business, and so we set up a meeting. I must have done OK, because he offered me the job." TSR hired Heard in 1983. After a few months of doing translation work in Nice, TSR moved the translating job to the home office in Lake Geneva, Wisconsin, so Heard moved to the United States.

After working for two years as a translator (which also included coordinating outside translators who turned the games into German, Italian, and Spanish), Heard transferred to TSR's Games Division in July 1985 as an acquisitions editor, working with Jon Pickens. When Pickens was promoted to editor of Strategy & Tactics, Heard became Games Acquisitions Coordinator, in charge of contracting freelance writers. Heard also did some game design, including adventure modules CM7, Tree of Life; M1, Into the Maelstrom; and co-authorship of DL12, Dragons of Faith.

In 2013, Heard decided to self-produce The World of Calidar, a completely new setting with no reference to a specific ruleset, but with some flavor similar to Mystara and the Princess Ark.

== Works ==
Bruce Heard worked on several products for TSR on the Dungeons & Dragons Basic Set game, and wrote the Voyage of the Princess Ark comic series that was published in Dragon magazine, as well as some Advanced Dungeons & Dragons products. He also worked for TSR as a product manager, director of production planning, and head of games acquisitions.
