= Clyde Caldwell =

American artist (born 1948)

- Born: February 20, 1948 (age 78); Gastonia, North Carolina, U.S.
- Known for: Fantasy art

Clyde Caldwell (born February 20, 1948) is an American artist. Self-described as a fantasy illustrator, he is best known for his portrayals of strong, sexy female characters.

With his work at TSR in the 1980s, he is considered one of the artists contributing to fantasy art's "golden age".

== Early life ==
Born on February 20, 1948, in Gastonia, North Carolina, Caldwell was interested in becoming an artist from an early age, "I became an artist sort of by default ... I couldn't do anything else! I was into music for awhile. I played the guitar for a local band. I also enjoyed writing both stories and songs. But drawing and painting were the easiest for me." Caldwell took up an interest in painting fantasy and science-fiction art while in junior high school. "My biggest influences back then were the covers of the Edgar Rice Burroughs books. I wanted to paint pictures like those covers. My parents had always encouraged me in my artwork, but they didn’t understand why I was painting science fiction. They wanted me to paint landscapes and still lifes." Caldwell earned a fine arts degree at the University of North Carolina at Charlotte, then graduated from the University of North Carolina at Greensboro with a Masters of Fine Arts degree. "I thought I might become a teacher, so I figured the masters degree was a good idea. When I started doing some fanzine work, that idea was shot."

== Career ==
Caldwell worked as an illustrator for The Charlotte Observer newspaper as well as doing commercial work for an advertising agency, before doing freelance illustrations for magazines such as a series of Barsoom covers for Heavy Metal. He also did cover work for Dragon, published by TSR, publishers of the Dungeons & Dragons role-playing game. “I was offered a job three different times by TSR, Inc., when I was freelancing. Finally, the third time, I decided to come up to Wisconsin to meet the people I was working with long distance, whom I might eventually be working with face-to-face if I accepted the position. I really liked the company and the people, so I agreed that day to work for them.” Some of Caldwell's early work included the covers for the three paintings for the 1985 Greyhawk Adventures novels, and 1985's Dragonlance Calendar, three paintings for the 1986 Amazing Stories Calendar, plus the cover and three interior paintings for the 1987 Dragonlance Legends Calendar, as well as several Dragonlance module covers. He was also known for his work on Star Frontiers. Artist Larry Elmore later commented that Caldwell's dragons, compared to those of other artists, appeared "more serpentine—slimmer and more snakeish."

Caldwell gained fame producing work for TSR from 1982 to 1992, illustrating many Dungeons & Dragons products at a time when the game was around the peak of its popularity. He was known in particular for his work on Ravenloft and Gazetteer gaming modules. Since 1992 he has again worked as a freelance artist.

His work was included as part of the 2002 collection Masters of Dragonlance Art. Caldwell has illustrated cards for the Magic: The Gathering collectible card game.

In 2014, Scott Taylor of Black Gate, named Clyde Caldwell as 9C in a list of The Top 10 RPG Artists of the Past 40 Years, saying "Clyde took great advantage of his place and offered up a great deal of sublime and lasting work, although he was never really one to go outside of TSR even after he left the company, although like many he went into covering novels."

=== Alleged plagiarism of Caldwell's work ===
In 2003, a Flash animation slideshow titled was released anonymously, alleging that a woman named Jan McRae had plagiarized the work of many artists, including Caldwell, for reproduction in proselytization tracts printed by the Children of God cult. After the slideshow was released, Karen Zerby, leader of the Children of God, acknowledged that McRae had copied the work of others, as did McRae herself, and McRae admitted wrongdoing.
