= D20 Future =

Tabletop role-playing game supplement

d20 Future
- d20 Future accessory
- Designers: Christopher Perkins, Rodney Thompson, J.D. Wiker
- Publishers: Wizards of the Coast
- Publication: 2004
- Genres: Generic futuristic
- Systems: d20 System, d20 Modern variant

d20 Future is a 2004 accessory for the d20 Modern role-playing game written by Christopher Perkins, Rodney Thompson, and JD Wiker. It facilitates the playing of campaigns in the far future, using elements such as cybernetics, mecha, mutations, robotics, space travel, starships, and xenobiology. d20 Future is one of the most extensive science-fiction d20 games and has its own SRD, which is a source for many other sci-fi d20 games.

== New rules ==
d20 Future introduced a number of new elements to d20 Modern, including:

- New classes, occupations, feats, and skill applications
- New equipment, include cybernetics and mecha
- Rules for robot player characters
- Rules for mutations
- Rules for scientific engineering, spaceships, and constructs
- Hazards and environments, including vacuum and radiation
- Progress levels, describing global levels of technological development

== Campaigns ==
The book presented a number of campaign models, which provided a framework for building a full campaign setting but did not include a full-scale setting. Campaign models introduced include:

- Bughunters, an adventure game and bug hunt setting inspired by Aliens, Starship Troopers, and its predecessor in Amazing Engine.
- Dimension X, an adventure game setting based on the concept of parallel universes, which are referred to as dimensions.
- From the Dark Heart of Space, a Fifth Element style setting inspired by the eternal struggle between good and evil, with a touch of the Cthulhu Mythos.
- Genetech, apparently an uncredited adaptation of the background of the Moreau series of books by S. Andrew Swann. It originally appeared as a mini-game in Polyhedron #155.
- Mecha Crusade, an anime-inspired (primarily Gundam-inspired) setting taking place in the 2050s that focuses on the war between Earth and the Colonists, with giant fighting robots (mecha) being used on both sides. It originally appeared as a mini-game in Polyhedron #154. Mecha Crusade uses a different system than the Guardians of Order-published d20 Mecha.
- Star*Drive, a political space opera taking placed in the 26th century. It is a remake of Alternity campaign setting of the same name.
- Star Law, a remake of the popular 1980s Star Frontiers space opera-based role-playing game. The mini-setting is cited to use material from Star Frontiers Alpha Dawn and Zebulon's Guide to Frontier Space.
- The Wasteland, a somewhat western-flavored post-apocalyptic fiction setting inspired by its predecessors in Metamorphosis Alpha and Gamma World.

== Expansions ==
=== d20 Cyberscape ===
d20 Cyberscape
- Designers: Owen K.C. Stephens
- Publishers: Wizards of the Coast
- Publication: 2005
- Genres: Generic cybernetic
- Systems: d20 System, d20 Modern variant

d20 Cyberscape is an expansion for the d20 Future supplement of d20 Modern. It adds more Cybernetics to accompany those found in d20 Future, as well as alternate forms of cybernetics, such as cybernetics in fantasy. It also includes a cyberpunk campaign model called CyberRave, in which the world has become a collection of corporation-owned and run countries.

=== d20 Future Tech ===
d20 Future Tech
- d20 Future Tech Accessory
- Designers: Rodney Thompson, J.D. Wiker
- Publishers: Wizards of the Coast
- Publication: 2006
- Genres: Generic futuristic technology
- Systems: d20 System, d20 Modern variant

d20 Future Tech is a 96-page supplement for the d20 Modern role-playing game and the d20 Future supplement. This supplement contains rules which expand on various weaponry and gadgets from d20 Future.

The book contains additional material expands of the following topics already established in d20 Future: Weapons/Personal Gear, Starships, Mecha, and Robotics. There is a chapter on how future technology affects life, and one on integrating different types of combat (Mecha vs Vehicle, Starship vs. Mecha, etc.).

== Reviews ==
- Pyramid

== See also ==
- D20 Apocalypse
- Dawning Star
- Star Wars Roleplaying Game (Wizards of the Coast)
- Traveller (role-playing game)
