= D20 Past =

Tabletop role-playing game supplement

d20 Past
- Cover of d20 Past
- Designers: James Wyatt, Gwendolyn F. M. Kestrel
- Publishers: Wizards of the Coast
- Publication: 2005
- Genres: Alternate history, pulp, steampunk
- Systems: d20 system
- Parent games: d20 Modern
- ISBN: 978-0-7869-3656-4

d20 Past is a d20 based role-playing game released by Wizards of the Coast in 2005. It was meant to be a supplement to d20 Modern, providing framework and new rules for campaigns based on historical events from the Renaissance to World War II, including new character options and rules for early modern firearms. It begins with an exploration of the historical period between 1450 and 1950, then provides rules for creating characters and campaigns that blend realism and fantasy. d20 Past also presents alternative campaign models, along with all the rules needed to play swashbuckling pirate adventures, Victorian horror investigations, thrilling Pulp Era escapades, and more, including three ready-to-play campaign modules.

== Synopsis ==
The book itself is divided into an introduction and five chapters:

- Chapter One - How Real Is Your Past? is a short essay on the different views on history and a discussion of the different modes of playing historical games.
- Chapter Two - Rules Components provides player and games master with the specific new rules and deviations from established Modern rules for a historic setting.
- Chapter Three - Age of Adventure provides d20 fantasy in a swashbuckler setting.
- Chapter Four - Shadow Stalkers does the same thing to a setting combining elements from Sherlock Holmes, H.P. Lovecraft and the American Wild West.
- Chapter Five - Pulp Heroes is the third setting provided, it enables the player to be a more contemporary hero and take on anything from Nazis or King Kong to J. Edgar Hoover's F.B.I.

Further period background information was made available as a Web Enhancement.

== Progress Levels ==
According to Wizards of the Coast, a Progress Level (PL) is an indication of the state of technology that exists in a particular society or an arbitrary measurement of how advanced a culture is, based on developments in technology and society. The concept was introduced in d20 Future (and even earlier in TSR's Alternity manuals by Bill Slavicsek) to describe both the level of technology in the campaign as well as the technology levels of other species comparative to the human one. They are similar to the Tech Levels in GURPS. Progress levels of six and higher were studied in d20 Future, with the default d20 Modern setting encompassing progress level five. In d20 Past, two progress levels are available such as: Progress level three (the age of reason) and progress level four (the industrial age).

== Skills and feats ==
Skills and feats have deviated remarkably from their d20 Modern standards to accommodate for the differences in technology. For example, certain uses of a skill that were acceptable under a modern standard may no longer apply to a campaign setting where the technologies to perform these actions may not have been available. Similarly, some feats may represent modern knowledge or techniques that were not available to people centuries prior. It also includes new uses of skills and feats that might be more appropriate for a historic campaign.
