= D20 Modern =

Tabletop role-playing game

d20 Modern
- The d20 Modern Roleplaying Game Core Rulebook
- Designers: Bill Slavicsek, Jeff Grubb, Rich Redman, Charles Ryan
- Publishers: Wizards of the Coast
- Publication: November 1, 2002; 23 years ago
- Years active: 2002-2006
- Genres: Modern, Science fiction, Cyberpunk
- Systems: d20 system, modified
- Chance: Dice rolling
- Media type: Roleplaying game books

d20 Modern is a modern fantasy role-playing game system designed by Bill Slavicsek, Jeff Grubb, Rich Redman, and Charles Ryan. The system's core rulebook was published by Wizards of the Coast on November 1, 2002; by 2006, ten additional supplements were released. The game is based on the d20 System and the Dungeons & Dragons 3rd Edition ruleset. It includes various campaign settings along with the tools to build campaigns in modern/contemporary settings.

== History ==
Wizards released d20 Modern in 2002 while the company was overhauling its Star Wars role-playing game. Wizards then expanded on the game, developing one of its settings into a sourcebook, the Urban Arcana Campaign Setting (2003). Wizards then extended this development of d20 even further, with the science-fiction game d20 Future (2004) as well as the historical game d20 Past (2005). Wizards ended this line in 2006 by updating their classic campaign setting Dark•Matter for d20 Modern.

== Alterations to the d20 System ==
=== Basic classes ===
In d20 Modern, each character is referred to as a hero. All heroes start with a first-level, basic class. Each basic class corresponds to one of the six ability scores in the d20 System. Each basic class has its own set of skills, feats, talents, saves, hit dice, wealth bonus, and so on. A beginning basic hero will become a more specific advanced-class hero at later levels, depending on which abilities a player favors for their character.

The six basic classes are:

- The Strong Hero, based on Strength (STR). These heroes are brawny, and they greatly favor melee combat.
- The Fast Hero, based on Dexterity (DEX). Nimble, quick, and able to evade most incoming attacks.
- The Tough Hero, based on Constitution (CON). Difficult to take down and can resist most sicknesses.
- The Smart Hero, based on Intelligence (INT). A know-it-all hero with an edge in brain-intensive skills.
- The Dedicated Hero, based on Wisdom (WIS). A highly intuitive and vigilant hero.
- The Charismatic Hero, based on Charisma (CHA). A hero with personal magnetism and a way with words.

=== Advanced Classes ===
In addition to basic classes, there are also advanced classes. Similar to basic classes but with requirements to fulfill. There are 14 advanced classes for which a player character may qualify over time:

- Acolyte
- Bodyguard
- Daredevil
- Field Medic
- Field Scientist
- Gunslinger
- Infiltrator
- Investigator
- Mage
- Martial Artist
- Negotiator
- Personality
- Soldier
- Techie

Advanced classes can be less or more easily achieved depending on the hero's basic class. For instance, a Tough Hero can be an excellent candidate for Bodyguard or Daredevil, but would have more difficulty becoming a Techie or Acolyte.

At later levels, the player may choose to multi-class their hero; for example, a Strong and Dedicated Bodyguard (two basic classes, one advanced), or a Smart Investigator and Field Scientist (one basic, two advanced). There are no limitations in the rule set as to how many classes a hero may have, but two or three are typical. Dividing experience and character development between too many classes results in breadth at the cost of having weaker abilities in each class.

Some gamemasters (GMs) may set restrictions on certain advanced classes in their campaign. E.g., the advanced classes might require more experience points to acquire, or some might not be available until specific objectives have been reached in the game campaign. GMs may also entirely rule out certain classes, e.g. Acolyte and Mage because their spell-casting abilities do not fit the GM's hard sci-fi scenario.

=== Action Points ===
One of the interesting additions to the system was the action points. Actions points are used by characters to affect game play greatly. Whenever a character spends one action point, the character receives a small boost in his or her skill checks, ability checks, level checks, or saving throws. There's a bit of restriction when and where to use them. As the character spends these points, they're very limited. However, through level advancement, he or she replenishes spent action points.

=== Feats, Skills, and Items ===
In order to fit the d20 Modern setting, some skills and items are reworded and rebalanced, and both the feats and skills mechanics receive expansions.

Also included are game statistics for both modern weapons and "archaic" weapons, such as swords, axes, and crossbows.

=== Occupations and Wealth Bonus ===
Occupations aren't considered classes but act as a job or career that a character holds. He or she may hold multiple occupations, but over time. There are over 19 different occupations and each with its own restrictions, such as age. As well, they open more options when choosing skills and higher Wealth bonus. The 19 occupations are: Academic, Adventurer, Athlete, Blue Collar, Celebrity, Creative, Criminal, Dilettante, Doctor, Emergency Services, Entrepreneur, Investigative, Law Enforcement, Military, Religious, Rural, Student, Technician, and White Collar.

Instead of using real world currency, such as United States dollar (USD) or Euro (EUR), it's been replaced with the Wealth bonus. It functions just like any real world currency: income, credit, debit, to deposit or withdraw, purchasing and selling, and so on. It also defines the characters' financial conditions, from being opulent to impoverishment. All characters have their own wealth. Determining wealth at first level, the player rolls a four-sided die two times (2d4), and then adds the results together. The result can be increased by occupation, the Windfall feat, and the Profession skill. Whenever the character advances in level, the player rolls a Profession check.

== Campaign settings ==
d20 Modern presents three sample campaign settings. These settings, unlike the rest of the book, feature the supernatural.

=== Shadow Chasers ===
In this setting, evil monsters, usually from one or more parallel dimensions, roam free around the world. However, most people do not see these creatures for what they really are, seeing instead a vague approximation which is still plausible in that person's beliefs about reality. (See consensus reality.) For example, an ogre would appear to the average person as a very burly man. The player characters are somehow capable of seeing through this veil, and typically take on responsibility for defending humanity from the monsters. It originally appeared as a d20 mini-game in Polyhedron Magazine issue #150.

=== Agents of Psi ===
In this campaign setting, magic (at least in the traditional sense) does not exist, but psychic capabilities called psionics do. Player characters typically work for a government agency investigating and/or using this quasi-supernatural force, but this is only a suggestion and is not strictly required by the rules. A novella taking place in this setting was published on the WotC website.

=== Urban Arcana ===
In this setting, dragons rule the boardrooms and bugbears rule the streets. It is a world where monsters and magic exist, yet the human psyche just cannot fathom them and covers up all supernatural events. Some, however, break that barrier and become aware of the world around them, and help Mages, Acolytes, and other magical characters fight with monsters from another realm. This campaign setting combines aspects of the previous two settings (Shadow Chasers & Agents of Psi) and uses the concept that all three settings coexist in the same reality (at least in Urban Arcana).

=== Other settings ===
==== Dark•Matter: Shades of Grey ====
Polyhedron #167 - Global Positioning: Arctic Research Station & Dark•Matter: Shades of Grey

Dark•Matter: Shades of Grey is a d20 Modern mini-game of conspiratorial suspense presented in Polyhedron Magazine issue #167 (also known as Dungeon Magazine issue #108) and then as a stand-alone d20 Modern book, Dark•Matter, in September 2006. It is a remake of the Dark•Matter campaign setting for Alternity. It uses concepts from the core d20 Modern RPG rules and the Urban Arcana and d20 Menace Manual sourcebooks, which are also recommended for use to get the most from the setting.

==== Mecha Crusade ====
Mecha Crusade was a d20 mini-RPG campaign setting in issue #154 of Polyhedron Magazine (Dungeon Magazine issue #95).

The setting was a take off of anime mecha series, like Mobile Suit Gundam or Macross.

==== Pulp Heroes ====
Polyhedron #149 - Pulp Heroes

Pulp Heroes started as a d20 mini-RPG found in Polyhedron Magazine issue #149 (also known as Dungeon Magazine issue #90). Polyhedron #161 (also known as Dungeon #102) contained a d20 Modern "update" of the Pulp Heroes mini-game.

The setting allows one to play games that take place during the famous Pulp Era of literature, filled with ancient dinosaurs, power-hungry gangsters, vengeful vigilantes, amazing superheroes, evil Nazis, bizarre inventions, mystical psionics, hard-boiled detectives, trained martial artists, curious explorers, eldritch aliens, and various other fantastic people, places, and things.

The worlds of H. P. Lovecraft's Cthulhu Mythos and Sir Arthur Conan Doyle's The Lost World, and famous individuals like Jules Verne, H. G. Wells, Doc Savage, Tarzan, and Indiana Jones serve as perfect examples of this era.

Many elements of Pulp Heroes were adapted into the later d20 Past sourcebook.

==== Thunderball Rally ====
Polyhedron #152 - Improved Initiative: d20 Innovation - Legendary Classes & Thunderball Rally

Thunderball Rally was the second mini-game in a brief series of previews for d20 Modern that appeared in the early issues of the third and last edition of Polyhedron Magazine, which was on the flipside of Dungeon Magazine.

Thunderball Rally, released as a preview for the d20 MODERN RPG in Polyhedron #152, is a d20 System mini-game about racing across the United States of America in 1976. The game creates an imaginary cross-country car race, and uses d20 System modern vehicle rules. The vehicle rules that were described in the game were also recommended for use with the previous d20 Modern mini-game preview Shadow Chasers (Polyhedron #150).

In Thunderball Rally, the player characters portray one of the crews in the largest, most lucrative, most illegal crosscountry road race in America. Examples of the genre include The Gumball Rally, Cannonball (and its later follow up/remake The Cannonball Run), The Blues Brothers, Death Race 2000, and Smokey and the Bandit, and iconic characters include the General Lee and Boss Hogg. Rules for Orangutan player characters subsequently appeared in Polyhedron #153 as a homage to the 1978 film Every Which Way but Loose.

== Official products ==
| Title | Author(s) | ISBN | Publication Date |
|---|---|---|---|
| d20 Modern Roleplaying Game | Bill Slavicsek, Jeff Grubb and Rich Redman | ISBN 0-7869-2836-0 | 1 November 2002 |
| Urban Arcana | Bill Slavicsek, Jeff Grubb, Eric Cagle and Dave Noonan | ISBN 0-7869-2659-7 | 1 May 2003 |
| d20 Menace Manual | JD Wiker, Eric Cagle and Matthew Sernett | ISBN 0-7869-2899-9 | 1 September 2003 |
| d20 Weapons Locker | Keith J. Potter | ISBN 0-7869-3132-9 | 1 February 2004 |
| d20 Future | Christopher Perkins, Rodney M. Thompson and JD Wiker | ISBN 0-7869-3423-9 | 1 August 2004 |
| d20 Past | James Wyatt | ISBN 0-7869-3656-8 | 1 March 2005 |
| d20 Apocalypse | Eric Cagle, Darrin Drader, Charles Ryan, Owen K.C. Stephens | ISBN 0-7869-3273-2 | 1 June 2005 |
| d20 Cyberscape | Owen K.C. Stephens | ISBN 0-7869-3695-9 | 1 September 2005 |
| d20 Future Tech | Rodney Thompson and JD Wiker | ISBN 0-7869-3949-4 | 1 February 2006 |
| d20 Critical Locations | Eric Cagle, Owen K.C. Stephens and Christopher West | ISBN 0-7869-3914-1 | 1 May 2006 |
| d20 Dark•Matter | Wolfgang Baur and Monte Cook | ISBN 0-7869-4349-1 | 1 September 2006 |

== Reception ==
The 2002 Pyramid review highlights that compared to other non-fantasy modern settings "it appears that in many ways, Wizards of the Coast has been significantly more conservative when adapting the d20 System to a modern setting. d20 Modern retains many elements that other modern and ultramodern games dispense with or modify, such as iterative attacks and hit points. However, d20 Modern uses some aspects of the game that appeared in the d20 Star Wars game. [...] The fundamental difference between the approach to classes and the corresponding D&D classes is that the d20 Modern classes are much more general".

Mark Theuar, for the gaming magazine Fictional Reality, wrote that he would "highly recommend this book to anyone wanting to play in a modern day rpg" and that "the interior artwork has sort of a graphic novel feel to it and it works very well for this setting". He highlighted his enjoyment of the section on guns and that "combat is similar to Call of Cthulhu d20 meaning that you can get dead real quick. [...] My favorite aspect about the world background is that we're already living about 90% of it. As a GM all you have to do is fill in the last 10%. It's not like building or learning a whole new fantasy world from scratch". Theuar also "particularly liked the Wealth system".

Academic Kris Green also highlighted the d20 Modern Wealth system in the book Mathematics in Popular Culture (2012) and called it an "excellent example of abstraction". Green wrote that "rather than force players to keep detailed records of every purchase a character makes and bank record he accesses, the d20 Modern designers created a single abstract quantity called 'Wealth' that determines how easy it is for a character to acquire equipment and resources. Players roll against the difficulty (which incorporates cost and availability as well as legality) of acquiring a good, and their wealth may change as a result of the roll, representing in the abstract the loss of assets".

== Reviews ==
- Coleção Dragão Brasil

== Legacy ==
Charlie Hall, for Polygon, stated that "back in 2002, d20 Modern helped to breathe life into third edition Dungeons & Dragons, expanding the tabletop role-playing game into a far more contemporary setting — less swords and sorcery, more ninjas and automatic weapons". Shannon Appelcline commented that d20 Modern was "sort of successful" in launching a "new wave of third-party" publication which used the d20 System, however, many other publishers had already begun creating modern and science-fiction d20 System publications before the release of d20 Modern. This new wave included hundreds of third-party publications alongside the additional ten d20 Modern books Wizards of the Coast released. Appelcline wrote that "Sword & Sorcery was probably the most noticeable, with their licensed version of Gamma World (2003-2004), though they covered their bets by saying the books could be used with D&D 3e or d20 Modern. But, many other publishers put out large d20 Modern lines. Some of the most notable were Adamant's Thrilling Tales (2005-2007) and Mars (2006-2007) line, Green Ronin's varied d20 Modern rules and settings, which culminated in Damnation Decade (2006), and Mongoose's new editions of the classic Macho Women with Guns (2003, 2005)".

=== Everyday Heroes ===
In 2022, Jeff Grubb – co-creator of d20 Modern – announced an upcoming role-playing system titled Everyday Heroes which is based on the 5th edition Dungeons & Dragons ruleset via Wizard's Open Game License. Sigfried Trent, one of the lead designers, described the game as merger of "the theme, the setting, the mood, the feeling of d20 Modern" and "the rules, the simplicity, and the modularity of 5e". Polygon called Everyday Heroes a "spiritual successor" to d20 Modern.

This system will be published by Evil Genius Games and will include licensed settings such as Escape from New York, Highlander, Kong: Skull Island, Pacific Rim, Rambo, The Crow, Total Recall, and Universal Soldier.

== See also ==
- Alternity
  - Star*Drive
  - Dark•Matter
  - StarCraft Adventures
- Darwin's World
- Dungeons & Dragons
- Gamma World
