= Gamma World =

1978 post-apocalyptic role-playing game

- Second edition basic rules cover
- Designers: James M. Ward; Gary Jaquet
- Publishers: TSR (1st-4th) editions; Wizards of the Coast (5th edition, 7th edition); Sword and Sorcery Studios (6th edition)
- Publication: 1978 (1st edition); 1983 (2nd edition); 1986 (3rd edition); 1992 (4th edition); 2000 (5th edition); 2003 (6th edition); 2010 (7th edition)
- Genres: Post-apocalypse, Science fantasy
- Systems: Custom (1st-4th) editions; Alternity (5th edition); d20 System (6–7th edition)

Gamma World is a post-apocalyptic science fantasy role-playing game in which player characters explore Earth centuries after the collapse of civilization, searching for artifacts from the time before "The Great Upheaval". The game was originally designed by James M. Ward and Gary Jaquet, and first published by TSR in 1978. It borrows heavily from Ward's earlier role-playing game, Metamorphosis Alpha.

== Setting ==
Gamma World takes place in the mid-25th century, more than a century after a second nuclear war had destroyed human civilization. This war is only vaguely described in most editions of the game, and what details are provided change from version to version:

The first two editions explained that ever-increasing material prosperity and leisure had led to ever-more radical and violent social movements, culminating in a final war in the years AD 2309–2322, and ascribe the final annihilation to a terrorist group called "The Apocalypse" and the ensuing retaliation by surviving factions.

Later versions would alter the reason for the collapse. The 2000 Alternity edition explained this as having been caused by the arrival of aliens and a nuclear response. The 2003 d20 Modern iteration explained collapse as due to uncontrolled nanotechnology and artificial intelligence. The 2010 edition attributes the destruction of civilization to the activation of the Large Hadron Collider, which caused multiple realities to exchange features in an event known as the Big Mistake.

All backstories agree that the cataclysm destroyed all government and society beyond a village scale, plunging the world into a Dark Age. In many editions of the game, technology is at best quasi-medieval (in the first edition, the crossbow is described as "the ultimate weapon" for most Gamma World societies). Some, such as the 2003 and, to a lesser degree, the 2010 edition, feature advanced technology that is well known and often easily available. In contrast, super-science artifacts in earlier editions were risky to use due to the average Gamma World character not knowing how to properly operate such devices, or possibly even what the device is at all. The post-apocalyptic inhabitants of Earth now refer to their planet as "Gamma World", or, in later editions, "Gamma Terra".

The setting is chaotic and dangerous and little resembles pre-apocalyptic Earth. The weapons unleashed during the final war were strong enough to alter coastlines, level cities, and leave large areas of land lethally radioactive. These future weapons bathed the surviving life of Earth in unspecified forms of radiation and biochemical agents, producing widespread, permanent mutations among humans, animals, and plants. This has caused mutations such as additional limbs, super-strength, and psychic powers. (Random tables of such improbable mutations are a hallmark of every edition of Gamma World.) Many animals and plants are sentient, semi-civilized species competing with surviving humans. Both humans and non-humans have lost most knowledge of the pre-war humans, whom Gamma World's inhabitants call "the Ancients". The only group with significant knowledge of the Ancients are isolated robots and other AIs that survived the war. These machines tend to be damaged, in ill repair, and/or hostile to organic beings.

Player characters include unmutated humans (referred to as "Pure Strain Humans" in most editions), mutated humans, sentient animals or plants, and androids. Characters explore ruins and strange post-apocalyptic societies to gain knowledge of the Ancients and social status for themselves. Common adventure themes involve protecting fragile post-apocalypse societies, retrieving such Ancient "artifacts" as power armor, laser pistols, and anti-grav sleds, or mere survival against the multifarious dangers of the future such as gun-toting mutant rabbits, death machines, and other, more hostile, Gamma Worlders.

A recurrent source of conflict on Gamma World is the rivalry among the Cryptic Alliances, semi-secret societies whose ideological agendas, sometimes monomaniacal ones, often bring them into conflict with the rest of the Gamma World. The Pure Strain Humans' Knights of Genetic Purity, for example, wish for genocide on mutants, while Iron Society seeks the same for baseline humans. Other rivalries involve attitudes towards Ancient technology. The Restorationists seek to rebuild Ancient society while others, the Seekers, wish to destroy it.

== System ==
Throughout the game's editions, Gamma World has been compatible with the then-current edition of Dungeons & Dragons (D&D). Attribute generation is the same, with a range of 3 to 18, randomly generated by rolling three six-sided dice. The attributes themselves are the same, but with occasional name changes such as Physical Strength instead of Strength and Mental Strength instead of Wisdom.

Character generation is mostly random, and features one of the game's most distinctive mechanics, the mutation tables. Players who choose to play mutants roll dice to randomly determine their characters' mutations. All versions of Gamma World eschew a realistic portrayal of genetic mutation to one degree or another, instead giving characters fantastic abilities like psychic powers, laser beams, force fields, life draining and others. Other mutations are extensions or extremes of naturally existing features transposed from different species, such as electrical generation, infravision, quills, extra limbs, dual brains, carapaces, gills, etc. These were offset with defects that also ranged from the fantastical—such as skin that dissolves in water, or a scent that attracts monsters—to the mundane, such as seizures, madness and phobias.

Characters in most versions of Gamma World earn experience points during their adventures, which cause the character's rank (in some editions, revel) to increase. Unlike D&D, however, the first two editions of Gamma World do not use the concept of true level or character class, and increases in rank do not affect the character's skills or combat abilities. In the first three editions of the game, character rank is primarily a measure of the character's social prestige.

The game mechanics used for resolving character actions vary between Gamma World editions. In the first two editions, use matrix-based mechanics, where two factors (one representing the actor or attacker, and one representing the opponent) are cross-referenced on a chart. For actions, such as attacks, the number located on the matrix represents a number the acting player must roll. For other actions (such as determining the result of radiation exposure), the matrix result indicates a non-negotiable result.

The third edition rules replaced specialized matrices with the Action Control Table (ACT), a single, color-coded chart that allowed players to determine whether a character action succeeded, and the degree of success, with a single roll. The ACT requires the referee to cross-reference the difficulty of a character action with the ability score used to complete that action, determining which column of the ACT is used for that action. The character's player then rolls percentile dice; the result is compared to appropriate column, determining a degree of success or failure and eliminating the need for second result roll (e.g. the damage roll that many games require after a successful combat action).

The fourth edition was directly compatible with second edition AD&D with some minor differences in mechanics. The fifth and sixth editions make the game a campaign Setting and require the core books to play. The fifth edition uses the Alternity system which is mostly represented in the book but required the core rules in order to resolve some factors. The sixth edition required the d20 Modern rulebook in order to play the game.

The seventh version uses a streamlined version of Dungeons & Dragons 4th edition mechanics. Character generation choice though was nearly fully removed. Instead of choosing a character class, a player had to roll a twenty-sided die two times and consult an accompanying character origin table. For example, a player might obtain the result "Radioactive Yeti" and gain the powers associated with the "Radioactive" and "Yeti" origins. Attributes, mutations, and skills were also randomly assigned. Two decks of cards comprising the core of a Collectible Card Game are included with the game. One deck represented random Alpha Mutations, which could be drawn to gain temporary powers, and the other contained various Omega Tech, powerful technological devices that could possibly backfire on those that used them. Some fourth edition rules enhancements for the setting include new damage types such as "Radiation", Gamma World-specific skills, and increased lethality. Despite these differences, it is possible to use characters and monsters from a D&D game in Gamma World and vice versa.

== History ==
=== First edition (1978) ===
The original Gamma World boxed set (containing a 56-page rulebook, a map of a devastated North America, and dice) was released in 1978. TSR published three accessories for the first edition of the game:

- GW1, Legion of Gold by Gary Gygax, with Luke Gygax, and Paul Reiche III
- GW2, Famine In Far-Go by Michael Price
- Gamma World Referee's Screen

Grenadier Miniatures supported the game, with a line of licensed miniatures.

At least one other TSR product was announced -- Metamorphosis Alpha to Omega, an adaptation of Metamorphosis Alpha's campaign setting to Gamma World's rules . Work on the adaptation was halted when a 2nd edition of Gamma World was announced. This was later released as Metamorphosis Alpha to Omega using the Amazing Engine rules.

=== Second edition (1983) ===
The second edition Gamma World boxed set (with rules designed by Ward, Jaquet, and David James Ritchie) was released in 1983. Two modules and two accessories were released for this version:

- GW3, The Cleansing War of Garik Blackhand by Michael Pierre Price and Garry Spiegle
- GW4, The Mind Masters by Philip Taterczynski
- GWAC1, Gamma World Referee's Screen and Mini-Module
- GWAC2, Gamma World Character Sheets

TSR also produced four packs of Gamma World miniatures. TSR started production on a third adventure module, which was to be assigned the identification code GW5 and had the working title Rapture of the Deep. This module was not published. However, a 'ghost' Second Edition GW5 Rapture of the Deep module was produced in 2007.

=== Third edition (1986) ===
The third edition of Gamma World was a boxed set, credited to James M. Ward. This version of the rules became notorious for the number of editorial mistakes, including cross-references to rules that didn't appear in the boxed set. The errors were serious enough that TSR published a Gamma World Rules Supplement containing the "missing" rules. The Rules Supplement was sent to gamers who requested it by mail, and included in reprintings of the boxed set.

The five modules TSR published for Gamma World's third edition introduced the setting's first multi-module metaplot, which involved rebuilding an ancient 'sky chariot':

- GW6, Alpha Factor by Kim Eastland
- GW7, Beta Principle by Bruce Nesmith
- GW8, Gamma Base by Kim Eastland
- GW9, Delta Fragment by Kim Eastland
- GW10, Epsilon Cyborgs by Kim Eastland

TSR stopped publishing the third edition before the multi-module storyline could be completed. In 2003 an unofficial conclusion to the series was published under the title GW11 Omega Project.

Despite its editorial issues, the third edition rules were well-received enough to win the 1986/1987 Gamer's Choice Award for "Best Science-Fiction Roleplaying Game".

Scott Taylor of Black Gate in 2015 rated the GW6-GW10 series as #7 in The Top 10 Campaign Adventure Module Series of All Time, saying "if you are ever in the mood to crack out Gamma World, or just have a great campaign setting for any post-apocalyptic campaign, this super series could be for you."

=== Fourth edition (1992) ===
The fourth edition of Gamma World was a 192-page softcover book, written by Bruce Nesmith and James M. Ward, published in May 1992 by TSR. It abandoned the Action Control Table and adopted mechanics resembling 2nd Edition Advanced Dungeons & Dragons. TSR published five accessories for this edition:

- GWA1, Treasures of the Ancients by Dale "Slade" Henson (ISBN 1-56076-577-1)
- GWA2, The Overlord of Bonparr by Jack A. Barker (ISBN 1-56076-599-2)
- GWQ1, Mutant Master by Bruce Nesmith (ISBN 1-56076-411-2)
- GWQ2, All Animals Are Equal by Dale "Slade" Henson (ISBN 1-56076-638-7)
- GWQ3, Home Before the Sky Falls by Tim Beach, Paul Riegel, Drew Bittner, and Kim Eastland (ISBN 1-56076-674-3)

TSR's Gamma World development team announced at Gen Con 1993 that no further products would be released for the fourth edition. They also announced that TSR had restarted development of Metamorphosis Alpha to Omega, but that the manuscript would be completed using the Amazing Engine rules.

=== Fifth edition (2000) ===
The fifth edition of Gamma World was a supplement for the science-fiction game Alternity. (In a nod to Gamma World's reputation for being repeatedly revised, the book's back cover states "That's right, it's the return of the Gamma World".) The Gamma World Campaign Setting (ISBN 0-7869-1629-X) was a 192-page softcover book written by Andy Collins and Jeff Grubb, published in 2000 by Wizards of the Coast (WOTC), only a month after WOTC announced its cancellation of the Alternity line. This version of Gamma World is unique as the only one not to have accessories or supplements.

=== Omega World (2002) ===
In September 2002, Omega World, a d20 System mini-game based on Gamma World and written by Jonathan Tweet, was published in Dungeon 94/Polyhedron 153. Tweet does not plan any expansions for the game, although it received a warm reception from Gamma World fans and players new to the concept alike.

=== Sixth edition (2003) ===
In November 2002, Sword & Sorcery Studios (SSS) announced that it had licensed the Gamma World setting from WOTC in order to produce a sixth version of the game. SSS's version of the game, which reached the market in 2003, used the d20 Modern system, and mimicked D&D's "three core book" model with three hardcover manuals:

- Gamma World Player's Handbook by Bruce Baugh, Ian Eller, Mikko Rautalahti, and Geoff Skellams
- Gamma World Game Master's Guide by Bruce Baugh, Werner Hager, Lizard, and Doug Oglesby
- Gamma World Machines and Mutants by David Bolack, Gareth Hanrahan, Patrick O'Duffy, and Chuck Wendig

Sword & Sorcery Studios also published three paperback supplements for the d20 version of Gamma World:

- Gamma World Beyond the Horizon by Ellen Kiley
- Gamma World Cryptic Alliances and Unknown Enemies by Owen K.C. Stephens, Alejandro Melchor, and Geoff Skellams
- Gamma World Out of the Vaults by James Maliszewski, John Snead, and Ellen P. Kiley

This new edition presented a more sober and serious approach to the concept of a post-nuclear world, at odds with the more light-hearted and adventurous approach taken by previous editions; it was also the first edition of the game to include fantastical nanotechnology on a large scale. In August 2005, White Wolf announced that it was reverting the rights to publish Gamma World products back to Wizards of the Coast, putting the game out of print again. Several critics and fans considered Tweet's Omega World to be a superior d20 System treatment of the Gamma World concept.

=== Mutant Future (2008 and 2010) ===
Mutant Future was an unofficial open gaming version published in 2008 and in revised form in 2010.

=== Seventh edition (2010) ===
At the Dungeons & Dragons Experience fan convention in early 2010, Wizards of the Coast announced a new version titled D&D Gamma World, eventually released in October of that year. The game is compatible with the D&D fourth edition rules and the System Reference Document, but is not considered a separate D&D setting.

The basic box included 80 non-random cards. In addition, random "boosters" of "Alpha Mutation" and "Omega Tech" cards for players are sold separately in packs of eight.

This edition of Gamma World includes the following three boxed sets.

- D&D Gamma World Roleplaying Game by Richard Baker and Bruce R. Cordell
- D&D Gamma World Expansion Kit: Famine in Far-go by Robert J. Schwalb
- D&D Gamma World Expansion Kit: Legion of Gold by Richard Baker and Bruce Cordell

Additional content was released for the seventh edition of Gamma World at Game Day 2010 and at the 2010 Penny Arcade Expo, Trouble in Freesboro and Pax Extraterrestria respectively. In addition, a Christmas themed adventure and vehicular combat rules were released online.

Additionally, two novels were published in the setting. Sooner Dead by Mel Odom was published February 1, 2011, and Red Sails in the Fallout by Pauli Kidd, published July 5, 2011.

=== Mutant Crawl Classics (2018) ===
Mutant Crawl Classics was an unofficial open gaming release from Goodman Games.

== Reception ==
In Issue 41 of Moves, Steve List reviewed the first edition and commented, "Gamma World is not a game for those who take their science fiction, science, or technology seriously, but it is a good set of rules for role-playing, provided an energetic referee can be found to run the show."

Don Turnbull reviewed the first edition of Gamma World for White Dwarf #10, giving it an overall rating of 9 out of 10, and stated that "Gamma World is good quality - let there be no mistake. This has not been thrown together in haste by earnest amateurs over glasses of cheap booze. It is a thoroughly professional job which deserves a place on the shelf (and the playing table) of anyone remotely interested in the science fiction game-setting."

In the 1979 book The Playboy Winner's Guide to Board Games, John Jackson reviewed the first edition, and noted that "Gama World could draw on a hundred science-fiction novels for material. It seems to be better organized than its cousin [Metamorphosis Alpha], and the campaign map of an altered America is almost worth the cost of the game itself."

Ronald Pehr reviewed the first edition of Gamma World in The Space Gamer No. 32 and commented "If you liked its progenitors, Gamma World is an interesting variant. Beginning players should find it easy to learn, and referees are challenged to create a playable, balanced world. It's somewhat expensive and the sudden-death power of futuristic weaponry and the lack of character 'levels' may put you off, but if the basic premise is appealing you'll probably enjoy Gamma World."

In the July 1980 issue of Fantastic Science Fiction, Greg Costikyan called the rules of the first edition "reasonably well written, if poorly organized; they are sufficient to base a campaign upon." However, Costikyan was appalled by the lack of hard science, calling the game "idiotic pseudo-science". Costikyan concluded, "I'm surprised that even TSR would attempt to foist junk like Gamma World off on an unsuspecting public."

In the 1980 book The Complete Book of Wargames, game designer Jon Freeman reviewed the first edition and commented, "This is in every sense an improved version of Metamorphosis Alpha. Rules have been tightened and elaborated, and the organization is clearly superior." Freeman concluded, "While it's not quite as open-ended in scope as Dungeons & Dragons, it has plenty of potential. It's hardly flawless, but Gamma World is one of the best things TSR has produced."

In Issue 11 of the French games magazine Jeu et Stratégie, Michel Brassinne found the game mechanics only ordinary, but noted "the mutation table is a gem worth its weight in gold, it is indeed sometimes hilarious." Brassinne pointed out that because of similarities in rules, this game could theoretically be combined with other TSR games such as AD&D, but he warned, "be careful, because this is not a walk of pleasure — I experienced it with characters from D&D and I can assure you that I will not do it again soon." Brassinne concluded, "Given dice, cards, modules, pencils and time, the result will be long, exciting sleepless nights."

Chris Baylis reviewed the second edition for Imagine magazine, and stated that "For a post nuclear holocaust role-playing game, Gamma World game has just about all the right ingredients, in the correct proportions. It is a very good introduction into the fantasy world of role-playing, and should seriously rival all other RPGs."

In the August 1984 issue of Asimov's Science Fiction, Dana Lombardy called the redesign of the 2nd edition "so extensive it should be considered a new game ... Gamma World offers one of the more bizarre and hostile environments to role-play in." Lombardy did note that "the technology is disjointed. You can have a dog-man with a spear fighting alongside a robot with a laser, allied against humanoids with pistols and swords." Lombardy concluded, "If you prefer more straightforward science fiction with known and approximately equal abilities and weapons, then Gamma World may not be for you. It's a topsy-turvy world, where the average pure-strain human is hard-pressed to exist among plants and animals mutated by humanity's wars. But if you like a challenge, and want to role-play something really different — Gamma World could be it."

In Issue 37 of the French games magazine Casus Belli, Denis Beck found many improvements in the third edition, writing, "Even if Gamma World sometimes reminds us of a transposition of AD&D into the future, this new version — where we do not find the many problems that handicapped the previous editions — really looks good alongside other post-apocalypse games." Beck concluded, "It may not be the game of the year, but fans of The Great Upheaval will find plenty to enjoy here."

In his 1990 book The Complete Guide to Role-Playing Games, game critic Rick Swan reviewed the third edition and commented "Though Gamma World may sound like a loony-bin version of Twilight: 2000, it makes for some exciting adventures as the PCs explore a high-tech wonderland of mysterious landmarks and artifacts". Swan concluded by giving the game a rating of 3 out of 4, saying, "It's a bang-up job [...] that is, if you don't take your nuclear holocausts too seriously."

Gene Alloway reviewed the complete fourth edition game of Gamma World in White Wolf #36 (1993), rating it a 3 out of 5 and stated that "Gamma World has not undergone a massive overhaul from the third edition. But it does seem better to me and to those around me familiar with both versions. It is an enjoyable, entertaining trip through an America that isn't quite what it used to be. If you like science fiction that takes some latitude with the laws of nature, you should visit Gamma World, Fourth Edition: it'll be a fun 'wahoo experience.'"

Scott Taylor for Black Gate in 2013 rated Gamma World as #8 in the top ten role-playing games of all time, saying "There seems to be an innate fascination with the end of the world, be it from a global thermal nuclear war, zombie outbreak, alien invasion, or super-bug and Gamma World finds a way to bring the fantastic to this type of setting. It has survived seven editions and three companies, but still, Gamma World remains a fun and functional game in the current RPG marketplace."

== Other reviews and commentary ==
- Polyhedron #1

== Cancelled video game ==
In 2011, a video game adaptation was announced at E3 called Gamma World: Alpha Mutation for the Xbox 360, PlayStation 3 and PC. It was to be developed by Bedlam Games and published by Atari. The video game was later cancelled.

== Legacy ==
The Swedish role playing game Mutant, released in 1984 by Äventyrsspel, was first pitched to its future writer as "Gamma World, set in Sweden".

The post-apocalyptic premise of the 1997 computer game Fallout was inspired by Gamma World. Game creator Tim Cain said it was not the most balanced RPG but it had a good spirit to it.

Gamma World was cited as a source of inspiration for the procedurally generated world-building in Caves of Qud.

== See also ==
- Aftermath! – Post-apocalyptic tabletop role-playing game
- After the Bomb – 1986 Post-apocalyptic tabletop role-playing game
- d20 Apocalypse – Post-apocalyptic tabletop role-playing game
- Darwin's World – Post-apocalyptic tabletop role-playing game
- Gammarauders – Post-apocalyptic board wargame
- The Morrow Project – Post-apocalyptic tabletop role-playing game
- Mutant Future – Post-apocalyptic tabletop role-playing game
- Twilight 2000 – Post-apocalyptic tabletop role-playing game
