= The Encyclopedia of Demons & Devils, Volume II =

The Encyclopedia of Demons & Devils, Volume II is a 2002 role-playing game supplement published by Fast Forward Entertainment.

== Contents ==
The Encyclopedia of Demons & Devils, Volume II is a supplement in which more than 100 demons and devils are detailed.

== Reviews ==
- Pyramid
- Backstab
- Fictional Reality (Issue 11 - Mar 2003)
- Legions Realm Monthly (Issue 4 - Dec 2002)
- Campaign Magazine (Issue 8 - Apr/May 2003)

== See also ==
- Encyclopedia of Weaponry
- The Complete Monstrous Fighter's Compendium
