= Star Drive =

Science fiction role-playing campaign setting

- Star Drive Campaign Setting
- Designers: David Eckelberry, Richard Baker; R. K. Post (illustrator)
- Publishers: TSR, Inc. (Wizards of the Coast)
- Publication: 1998
- Genres: Science fiction
- Systems: Custom (Alternity)

Star Drive (stylized as Star*Drive) is a science fiction campaign setting that was published in 1998 by TSR, Inc. for the Alternity role-playing game. The first published setting for Alternity was provided in the Star Drive Campaign Setting book in 1998.

It was written by David Eckelberry and Richard Baker. This setting book also requires the Player's Handbook and Gamemaster Guide for the Alternity game system. Much of the material created for this campaign setting was later reused in the d20 Future supplement of the d20 Modern role-playing game.

== Synopsis ==
Star Drive is set in the 26th century, starting in the year 2501. Humankind has gained access to faster-than-light technology called the stardrive, a merger of technology between humans and the alien Fraal. A period of stellar colonization of habitable worlds ensues, led by six wealthy power blocs. New powers emerged, forming the Terran Empire in 2250. Tensions between the colonies led to the first galactic war in 2299, finally ending in 2312 with the emergence of 26 stellar nations.

A second, even nastier war began in 2346, sparked by a rebellion of mutants. This led to a pullback of the humans from their maximum expansion, isolating many colonies. The war continued for over 100 years, leaving worlds devastated and nations and alliances in difficult financial straits. The war ended in 2472 with the signing of the Treaty of Concord. This agreement has held the peace, barely, for the last three decades.

In the course of the past five centuries, humans have contacted several alien races. This began with first contact with the Fraal in the Sol System, followed by the brutish Weren, cybernetically enhanced Mechalus, reptilian T'sa, and gliding Sesheyan. A total of 50 sentient species in all have been contacted, with each being rated at various levels of development. (Some are considered borderline sentient.)

At the beginning of the 26th century, Humanity's political and social structure is divided into Stellar Nations (once countries), rich corporations or federations, most trying to collect their former colonies. These are : Austrin-Ontis Unlimited, Borealis Republic, Hatire Community, Insight, Nariac Domain, Orion League, Orlamu Theocracy, Rigunmor Star Consortium, StarMech Collective, Thuldan Empire, Union of Sol, and Voidcorp.

In addition there is a thirteenth nation called the Galactic Concord, created by the Treaty of Concord. The Galactic Concord is made up of citizens and territories donated by the other Stellar Nations.

=== Stardrive ===
The "stardrive" is a type of hyperdrive that operates on the principles of gravity induction. By combining two pieces of technology, the induction engine and the mass reactor, it allows travel at FTL speeds through the extra-dimensional medium of "Drivespace". Depending on the engine power of a stardrive, it could travel anywhere from 5 to 50 lightyears in a single trip, but due to the spatial physics of Drivespace, any and all travel between two points takes exactly 121 hours (approx. 5 days), no matter how far apart or how close the two points are.

=== The Klicks ===
Klick, by Stephan Martinière, from d20 Future.

The Klicks are a fictional race of aliens within Star Drive.

At the far end of the Verge, alien species unheard of before the Second Galactic War have begun to stir. Slowly but inexorably expanding into civilized space, the alien klicks and their allies began by devastating the entire Silver Bell colony on Spes, followed by fierce ground fighting on Rakke. The Galactic Concord has responded as quickly as possible, but faster-than-light technology being what it is, even distress messages take many days to get through.

Klicks are arachnid-like aliens from a distant part of the Milky Way galaxy. Ferocious, aggressive, and merciless, they have descended on human-controlled space in a slow and steady wave of invasion. Though the Galactic Concord has slowed their progress, the Klicks are determined and resourceful.

Klicks have strange, wedge-shaped bodies covered with smooth, chitinous plates. They possess six multi-jointed legs ending in thick claws, and an additional pair of forelimbs ending in sharp, manipulating claws. A Klick's sensory organs hang in a pendulous glob below the main part of its body, between the forelimbs.

The Klicks employ brutal but effective "hit-and-run" combat tactics. They favor ambushes and overwhelming numbers. Military analysts have suggested that Klicks have a hive-mind social structure, like terrestrial insects, but scientists discard the notion as unlikely "Earth-centered" thinking.

The name "Klick" was coined by Galactic Concord soldiers and based on the odd clicking sounds that the aliens make when they communicate. To further stymie efforts to understand this enigmatic species, Klicks captured in combat never survive longer than a few hours—generally because of terrible wounds sustained during their apprehension.

A Klick naturally produces a field of energy that causes non-Klicks to feel weak and tired. Galactic Concord soldiers, accordingly, prefer to battle Klicks from a safe distance.

== Contents ==
The Star Drive Campaign Setting book is hardbound with 256 pages illustrated in color. It is divided into chapters covering the history of the setting; a description of the conditions, economy, and technology of the 26th century; descriptions of the various stellar nations within a range of over 1,000 light years; a more detailed look at a mysterious distant region known as the Verge, and finally game-specific details covering the player species, careers, employment, skills, equipment, and special game options available for players.

The game world includes a variety of standard fare science fiction features. These include psionics, cybernetics, robots, spacecraft, mutants, and advanced medicine. The level of technology is at "Progress Level" 7 (Progress Levels are used in Alternity to describe the technology of a civilization, with present-day Earth described as Progress Level 5, and the Industrial Age described as Progress Level 4). Characters are typically employed and have an allegiance to a company or government. They may also follow one of the future religions described in this book.

Players can play humans or one of a number of extraterrestrial species detailed in the Alternity Player's Handbook.

The Verge is described, in many cases, planet by planet. The more prominent planet descriptions give a broad overview of the world, the government, and sites of interest. Maps of the main worlds are also show at a high scale.

The cover was among artist R. K. Post's first work for TSR.

=== Professions ===
The following careers are available to players:

Combat Specs
bodyguard, corporate security specialist, gunner, law enforcer, martial artist, alien combat spec, mercenary, soldier, and spacehand.
Diplomats
ambassador, clergy, Concord administrator, corporate executive, entertainer, first contact consul, free trader, military officer, naval officer, stellar noble, and swindler.
Free Agents
bounty hunter, corsair, explorer, gambler, guide/scout, investigator, outlaw, reporter, smuggler, spy, and thief.
Tech Ops
crewman, comptech, gridpilot, doctor, engineer, independent pilot, medtech, scholar, and scientist.
Mindwalkers
biokineticist, biowarrior, ESPion, mystic, telekineticist, psiguard, telepath, and mind knight.

== Publications ==
=== Books ===
==== Main ====
- Star Drive Campaign Setting

==== Supplements ====
- Arms & Equipment Guide
- Alien Compendium: Creatures of the Verge
- Alien Compendium II: The Exploration of 2503
- The Externals (Only available as a PDF)
- Klick Clack
- The Last Warhulk
- The Lighthouse
- Outbound: An Explorer's Guide
- Planet of Darkness
- Star Compendium: Systems of the Verge
- System Guide to Aegis
- Threats from Beyond

=== Tie-in fiction ===
==== Novels ====
===== Harbinger trilogy =====
1. Starrise at Corrivale by Diane Duane
2. Storm at Eldala by Diane Duane
3. Nightfall at Algemron by Diane Duane

===== Stand-alone =====
- On the Verge by Roland Green
- Zero Point by Richard Baker
- Two of Minds by William H. Keith
- Gridrunner by Thomas M. Reid

==== Anthology ====
1. Starfall (short story collection), edited by Martin H. Greenberg

== Reviews ==
- Backstab #11
