= Amazing Engine System Guide =

1993 role-playing game supplement

Amazing Engine System Guide is a 1993 role-playing supplement for Amazing Engine published by TSR.

== Contents ==
Amazing Engine System Guide is a supplement in which an overview of the concepts of the game is presented.

== Publication history ==
In 1993 TSR ended production on most of its role-playing game lines, including Gamma World, Marvel Super Heroes, and Basic Dungeons & Dragons, and replaced these soon after with a new universal game system presented in the Amazing Engine System Guide (1993).

== Reception ==
Denys Backriges reviewed The Amazing Engine System Guide in White Wolf #37 (July/Aug., 1993), rating it a 2 out of 5 and stated that "TSR's method may allow for more varied genres since so few rules are actually shared. For an inexperienced gamer, the System Guide can be recommended because it serves as a good introduction to roleplaying. However, advanced gamers may be disappointed by the lack of detail in the core rules of Amazing Engine."

== Reviews ==
- Windgeflüster (Issue 24 - Dec 1993)
