= Ship of Fools =

Ship of fools is an allegory that has long been a fixture in Western literature and art.

Ship of Fools may refer to:

== Literature ==
- Ship of Fools (satire), a 1494 satire by Sebastian Brant
- Ship of Fools (Porter novel), a 1962 novel by Katherine Anne Porter
- Ship of Fools (Stone novel), a 1997 Doctor Who spin-off novel by Dave Stone
- The Ship of Fools (Spanish: La nave de los locos), a 1984 novel by Cristina Peri Rossi
- Ship of Fools (Russo novel), a 2001 novel by Richard Paul Russo
- The Ship of Fools, a 2001 novel by Gregory Norminton
- "Ship of Fools", a short story by Charles Stross from the 2002 collection Toast: And Other Rusted Futures
- "Ship of Fools" (short story), a short story by Ted Kaczynski
- Ship of Fools (Carlson book), a 2018 political book by commentator Tucker Carlson

== Art ==
- Ship of Fools (painting) (c. 1490–1500), a painting by Hieronymus Bosch
- Ship of Fools (c. 2006–2007), a painting by John Alexander
- Ship of Fools I-IV, 2016, a series of four paintings by Lucien Smith

== Film and television ==
- Ship of Fools (film), a 1965 film based on the Katherine Anne Porter novel
- Ship of Fools (Kappa Mikey episode), the fourth episode of the animated sitcom Kappa Mikey

== Gaming ==
- Ship of Fools (Psychosis), a 1993 supplement for the role-playing game Psychosis
- Ship of Fools (video game), a 2022 video game

== Music ==
=== Songs ===
- "Ship of Fools" (The Doors song), 1970
- "Ship of Fools" (Erasure song), a 1988 single by Erasure
- "Ship of Fools" (Robert Plant song), a 1988 single by Robert Plant
- "Ship of Fools" (World Party song), a 1987 single by World Party
- "Ship of Fools", by Alphaville from the 2003 album CrazyShow
- "Ship of Fools", by Bob Seger and the Silver Bullet Band from the 1976 album Night Moves
- "Ship of Fools", by Doves, bonus track from the 2009 album Kingdom of Rust
- "Ship of Fools", by Echo & the Bunnymen, B-side to the 1987 single "The Game"
- "Ship of Fools", by the Grateful Dead from the 1974 album Grateful Dead from the Mars Hotel
- "Ship of Fools", by Graveyard and Goat
- "Ship of Fools", by John Cale from the 1974 album Fear and 1992 live album Fragments of a Rainy Season
- "Ship of Fools", by The Residents from the 1992 album Our Finest Flowers
- "Ship of Fools", by Ron Sexsmith from the 2006 album Time Being
- "Ship of Fools", by Sarah Brightman from the 1993 album Dive
- "Ship of Fools", by Scorpions from the 1993 album Face the Heat
- "Ship of Fools", by Secret Chiefs 3 from the 2001 album Book M
- "Ship of Fools", by Soul Asylum from the 1986 album Made to Be Broken
- "Ship of Fools", by Van der Graaf Generator from the 1978 album Vital
- "Ship of Fools", by Yngwie Malmsteen from the 2002 album Attack!!

=== Albums ===
- Ship of Fools (album), a 1986 album by Tuxedomoon
- Ship of Fools, a 1988 album by John Renbourn

== Other ==
- Ship of Fools (website), a UK-based Christian website
- Ship, captain, and crew, a dice game also known as Ship of Fools
