= D20 Apocalypse =

Post-apocalyptic tabletop role-playing game

d20 Apocalypse
- d20 Apocalypse Roleplaying Game Supplement
- Designers: Eric Cagle, Darrin Drader, Charles Ryan, Owen K.C. Stephens
- Publishers: Wizards of the Coast
- Publication: 2005
- Genres: Science fiction, Post-apocalyptic
- Systems: d20 System, d20 Modern variant

d20 Apocalypse is a 96-page softcover supplement to the d20 Modern role-playing game, providing a rules framework and setting guides for campaigns set in a post-apocalyptic setting.

== Scenarios ==
Included in the rulebook are a listing of general ways in which the modern world might experience an apocalypse, drawing on sources which include religious eschatology, current science, and popular fiction. These methods include, among others: an environmental disaster, alien invasion, nuclear war, plague, and supernatural disaster. For each scenario, a brief description outlines the scenario and its particular effects on the setting. For instance, a plague scenario would not carry with it the same radiation dangers and physical damages to the infrastructure as would a nuclear war.

== Aftermath ==
=== Passage of Time ===
Following the apocalyptic event, the post-apocalyptic setting is further defined based on the amount of time which has passed since the event. The varying amounts of time are divided into four distinct eras:

- Aftermath - The event just happened, and some of the immediate effects are still ongoing. Survivors still recall the world from before the event.
- Generation 0 - The first and second generation born after the event reaches maturity. Elders still recall the world from before the event, but only as vague recollections from their distant childhood.
- Dark Ages - Approximately a dozen generations have passed since the event, and any history from before the event is melded into legend and myth.
- New World - Civilization has developed again in a new form. Much of the setting remains barbaric and dangerous, but more wide-ranging governments and social structures exist.

=== Types of Societies ===
A second section details types of societies which are likely to appear following a re-ordering of society. These include tribal groups, ethnic groups, religious societies, etc.

== New rules ==
Given the collapse of society, the Wealth system from d20 Modern (which is based on a character's credit and standard of living as much as their cash on hand) no longer applies, and in its place the barter system is used. In addition, due to the setting, certain items (such as ammunition) are worth more than they would be in a functioning society, while others (such as electronic entertainment) are worthless. The new barter system prices all items according to their relative value in a post-apocalyptic setting, using Trade Units in place of dollars or Wealth DCs.

d20 Apocalypse adds a few other new rules to the game system, including rules for handling vehicle modification and fallout areas, as well as rules for scavenging, post-apocalyptic equipment, and mutations.

== Campaign models ==
d20 Apocalypse includes three sample campaign models, providing additional rules and setting material for each model. The models included are:

- Atomic Sunrise - a typical post-apocalyptic setting inspired by Mad Max
- Earth Inherited - a post-Rapture setting following a supernatural Armageddon, which leaves the world peopled with warring factions of angels and devils
- Plague World - a post-war setting following a failed alien invasion which includes a mutagen affecting aliens, humans and animals alike. Key to this scenario is the inclusion of Rip Van teams, which are medically frozen during the event and brought out of hibernation centuries later to rebuild society (akin to The Morrow Project).

Each campaign model includes relevant rules, monsters, prestige classes, NPC groups, NPC's, and equipment.

== Reviews ==
- Pyramid
