= Gamma World Player's Handbook =

- Publisher: Sword and Sorcery Studios
- Publication date: 2003

Gamma World Player's Handbook is a 2003 role-playing game supplement published by Sword and Sorcery Studios for Gamma World.

== Contents ==
Gamma World Player's Handbook is a supplement in which the Gamma World setting is updated to the d20 Modern rules.

== Publication history ==
Shannon Appelcline noted that "Third-party publishers were happy to use the d20 Modern, d20 Future and d20 Past genre books as the basis of their own campaign settings too and one of those was particularly notable to Wizards. White Wolf used the d20 Modern rules to publish a licensed Gamma World Player's Handbook (2006) – now the sixth(!) iteration of the game – as well as a few supplements."

== Reviews ==
- Syfy
- Backstab
- Pyramid
