= Dark Matter (role-playing game) =

- Dark Matter cover
- Designers: Wolfgang Baur, Monte Cook
- Publishers: TSR, Inc. (Wizards of the Coast)
- Publication: 1999
- Genres: Science fiction, near-future conspiracy
- Systems: Custom (Alternity)

Dark Matter is a science fiction/conspiracy theory campaign setting set in the modern day. It was originally published in December 1999 by Wizards of the Coast as the second campaign setting for the Alternity science fiction role-playing game. It was written by Wolfgang Baur and Monte Cook. In 2006 the setting was converted to d20 Modern rules and re-published as a standalone book, but it then received no further follow-ups.

== Development ==
Wolfgang Baur did considerable research into the occult, UFO, and government conspiracy theories in preparation for writing the Dark Matter game.

== Setting ==
The Hoffmann Institute investigates strange creatures and phenomena. Players take on the roles of members of this organization, and delve into the supernatural and mysterious. The premise of the game is that nearly every strange or supernatural story ever widely told is true, but a web of conspiracies and secret organizations hide this truth from the average person. The premise was not unique to Dark Matter and had first been used as the basis for a role-playing game in Bureau 13.

== Contents ==
The original book was hardbound with 288 pages illustrated in color. It was divided into chapters covering the background of the Dark Matter setting to include an introduction to the Hoffmann Institute, hero creation, magic and psionics, history of the setting, the Illuminati, and places of interest. Highlights include:

- The true and secret history of Earth.
- Detailed descriptions of 13 powerful conspiracies and secret societies pulling the strings of power, plus nearly 20 more minor organizations.
- Dozens of mysterious sites and hidden strongholds, from the ancient enigma of the Pyramids to the rotten façade of Washington, D.C.
- New skills and careers for heroes, including options for advanced characters.
- New rules for using FX (supernatural/psychi powers) in Alternity games, including 45 new Arcane Magic and Faith FX spells.
- Nearly two dozen strange creatures.
- Gamemaster tips and tricks for running paranormal- and conspiracy-based games.
- Raw Recruits, an introductory adventure.
- Alternity Fast-Play Rules.

== Works related to the core book ==
=== Supplements and adventures ===
Four accessories were published in 2000 for the setting, three in perfectbound paperback and one as a PDF file. There were also articles in Dungeon magazine, Amazing Stories, and Dragon magazine.

- The Dark Matter Arms and Equipment Guide (2000) provides a more detailed list of equipment appropriate to the setting.
- The Xenoforms Book (2000) details additional supernatural and alien creatures.
- The Killing Jar (2000) was the first adventure published after the ones in the main rulebook.

The last supplement, distributed as an electronic PDF, is The Final Church (2000). It is a combination sourcebook and adventure which provides information on the titular organization and pits the characters against it.

== Tie-in novels ==
=== In print ===
- In Hollow Houses (2000), by Gary A. Braunbeck
- If Whispers Call (2000), by Don Bassingthwaite
- In Fluid Silence (2000), by G. W. Tirpa (Philip Athans)
- Of Aged Angels (2001), by Monte Cook

=== PDF only ===
- By Dust Consumed (2001), by Don Bassingthwaite. This was available for a short period of time as a PDF file.

== d20 Modern system ==
Some of the material has since been incorporated into the d20 Modern role-playing game and its d20 Menace Manual supplement. Dark Matter was first converted into a d20 Modern campaign in Dungeon #108/Polyhedron #163 as Dark Matter: Shades of Grey. In September 2006, saw the publication of d20 Dark Matter.

== Reception ==
In 2000, Dark Matter won the Origins Awards for Best Graphic Presentation of a Roleplaying Game, Adventure, or Supplement of 1999.

In a review in the February 2000 issue of InQuest Gamer, Dan Joyce stated that Dark Matter is "one of the best campaign settings" ever published by Wizards of the Coast and its subsidiary TSR, Inc.

== Reviews ==
- Backstab #19

== See also ==
- Delta Green
