= The Cleansing War of Garik Blackhand =

Role-playing game supplement

Covcer art by Jim Holloway, 1983

The Cleansing War of Garik Blackhand (also known by its catalogue number, GW3) is an adventure published by TSR in 1983 for the second edition of the science fiction role-playing game Gamma World.

== Plot summary ==
In the post-apocalyptic future setting of Gamma World, the player characters are members of the primitive White Feathers, a mixture of humans, humanoids and mutant animals who live in the area of today's Yellowstone Park. The White Feathers are in the midst of peace negotiations with the rival Gray Rocks when the parley is disrupted by the local chapter of the pure-human Knights of Purity led by Garik Blackhand. Members of the Gray Rocks suddenly attack members of the White Feathers, accusing them of being in league with the Knights of Purity. In the chaos, the White Feathers' shaman is mortally wounded. Before he dies, he tells the player characters to find proof that the Knights of Purity somehow framed the White Feathers.

The Cleansing War of Garik Blackhand features nine linked adventure scenarios, and game statistics for new creatures as well as artifacts.

== Publication history ==
TSR published the first edition of Gamma World in 1978, then released a second edition in 1983. Two adventure for the second edition were released the same year, The Mind Masters, and The Cleansing War of Garik Blackhand, a 32-page book with an outer cardstock folder written by Michael Pierre Price and Garry Spiegle, with art by Jim Holloway.

Nothing else would be published for Gamma World until TSR released a third edition in 1986.

== Reception ==
Chris Baylis reviewed The Cleansing War of Garik Blackhand for Imagine magazine, and warned potential buyers that "All modules need some work of the GM, and GW3 is certainly no exception. The sketchy background and the uncovered contingencies must be thought over with care."
