= Charles Ryan (game designer) =

American game designer

- Occupation: Game designer

Charles M. Ryan is a game designer who has worked primarily on role-playing games.

== Career ==
Charles Ryan ran the company Chameleon Eclectic which had been publishing games such as Millennium's End (1992) and Psychosis (1994) in Blacksburg, Virginia. Ryan was later working at Last Unicorn Games when Wizards of the Coast purchased the company, and was the only employee to relocate to Seattle when Bill Slavicsek made the decision to shut down the Los Angeles office of the remaining Last Unicorn Games division in December 2000. Cubicle 7 increased its staff in 2011 by hiring experienced game designers like Ryan, Gareth Ryder-Hanrahan, Walt Ciechanowski, and Neil Ford.

His D&D editing and design work includes the 3.5 revisions of the Player's Handbook, Monster Manual, and Dungeon Master's Guide (2003), the Miniatures Handbook (2003), the Dragonlance Campaign Setting book (2003), Draconomicon (2003), Unearthed Arcana (2004), and Monster Manual III (2010).
