= Encyclopedia of Weaponry =

2002 tabletop game supplement

Encyclopedia of Weaponry is a 2002 role-playing game supplement published by Fast Forward Entertainment for d20 System.

== Contents ==
Encyclopedia of Weaponry is a supplement in which an illustrated 128‑page arsenal of exotic melee arms, cultural oddities, and full siege engines—complete with history, fantasy‑race usage, stats, and rules is presented.

== Reviews ==
- Pyramid
- Fictional Reality (Issue 11 - Mar 2003)
- Legions Realm Monthly (Issue 5 - Jan 2003)
- Legions Realm Monthly (Issue 11 - Jul 2003)
