= Darwin's World =

Post-apocalyptic tabletop role-playing game

- First, second, and 2.5 edition covers
- Designers: Dominic Covey first and second edition; Chris Davis second edition
- Publishers: RPGObjects
- Publication: 2001 first edition; 2003 second edition; 2005 2.5 edition
- Genres: Post-Apocalyptic
- Systems: d20 Modern
- Website: www.darwinrpg.com

Darwin's World, created by Dominic Covey, is a post-apocalyptic role-playing game first published under the d20 Open Game License in 2001. Originally designed as a quick adaptation of the third edition Dungeons & Dragons rules, the game has since been greatly expanded and revised and now utilizes the d20 Modern rules. Several Darwin's World books and supplements have been published, though most support for the game is in PDF format. In 2010, RPGObjects began producing game books using Pinnacle's Savage Worlds system.

The online e-zine, Post Apocalyptic Dispatch, continues to provide short articles that support game play for both gamemasters and players alike. The game is still heavily supported with new material coming out on a regular basis.

== Mature Themes ==
Unlike many existing post-apocalyptic role-playing games, Darwin's World is often described as a darker and more "realistic" game system. In specific, its use of real-life deformities and genetic diseases to portray character defects, as well as issues like slavery, racism, and drug use give it a grittier quality than most post-apocalyptic RPGs, which often have a fantastic or "comic book" feel that requires a broader willingness to suspend disbelief.

== Versions 2.0 and 2.5 ==
While the original Darwin's World books clearly put forth a timeline and history, the second edition (and most recent edition, 2.5) has a broader focus intending to provide rules, suggestions, and guidelines for any kind of post-apocalyptic campaign setting. The default setting remains a wasteland created by global nuclear/biological/chemical warfare, however (See Weapon of mass destruction). There is a strong focus on regions that once constituted the Midwest and Western United States; numerous modules published for the game are nominally set in "desert" or "wasteland" areas. More specific locations include the desert trade town of Tucumcari, the sunken city of Bakersfield and its strange subterranean monsters, the overgrown ruins of Los Angeles, a San Francisco overrun by anti-technology zealots, and a decadent society thriving in the futuristic domed cities of the Midwest. One supplement went into great detail exploring the fate of the Pacific Northwest.

== Game Supplements ==
A wide range of supplements, sourcebooks, and modules are available for Darwin's World.

- Darwin's World 2: Survivor's Handbook. The current edition of the basic rules.
- Cave of Life. A low-level adventure detailing an abandoned missile silo.
- The Lost City/Return To The Lost City. A journey to a monster-infested city sunken beneath the earth.
- Death By Corium Light. High-level adventure detailing the corium mines of Little Vegas.
- The Foundationists. A sourcebook detailing the setting's premier technology-crazed faction.
- Metal Gods. Rules for robots and making androids and cyborgs as characters.
- The Lost Paradise. A regional sourcebook detailing the Pacific Northwest.
- Terrors of The Lost Paradise. A sourcebook presenting new monsters.
- Against The Wastelords. A low-level adventure involving a desperate race to find a nuclear missile.
- New World Order. A mid-level adventure that involves the characters in a war against a strange new enemy.
- The Last God. A high-level adventure pitting the characters against an animate and intelligent bioweapon that pre-dates the Fall.
- High Road To Hell. Gen Con 2004 adventure. A mid-level adventure utilizing a time limit mechanic.
- One Man's Garbage/Another Man's Treasure. Gen Con 2005 adventure. A mid-level adventure in which characters struggle to find the legendary "Mount of Thorns".
- Humanity In A Bottle. Boxed set sourcebook/module describing in detail a dystopian society long forgotten by the inhabitants of the world.
- The Broken and The Lost. A sourcebook presenting new rules for savage characters, tribes, and societies.
- The Ruin at The End of The World. A sourcebook/module detailing the ruins of Los Angeles; also the first Darwin's World supplement to make use of supernatural story elements.
- Bad News In Bugtown. Gen Con 2007 adventure. A low-level adventure set in the ruins of Amarillo.
- Halidom. Boxed set module detailing an epic campaign against a notorious raider army, the "Doomriders".
- Secrets of The Mind Masters. A high-level adventure pitting the player characters against the super-psychics known as the "Savants".

== Real-Life Inspiration ==
Numerous adventures written for Darwin's World either briefly feature, reference, or center around real-life places and events. These include:

- The adventure, Cave of Life, describes an old and abandoned Titan missile silo, accurately detailed.
- In The Last God, the real-life town of Center, Colorado, is re-imagined as a covert biological weapons plant disguised as a small backwater town. The map used in the adventure is precisely modeled on the actual town.
- The "Mount of Thorns" that is the object of the player character's quest in Another Man's Garbage is the Yucca Mountain nuclear waste repository.
- The Ruin at The End of The World features numerous Los Angeles landmarks. The Pasadena Arboretum is filled with giant mutant plants, the L.A. city library is inhabited by a mysterious vampire, City Hall is a haunt for a gang of thugs, and the ruins of Hollywood are now home to a fledgling empire of half-man, half-beast creatures.
- The monument at Mount Rushmore plays a major role in the campaign adventure, "Halidom".
- Certain details of the Philadelphia Experiment are mentioned (and play an important role) in Secrets of The Mind Masters.

== Related works ==
- Darwin's World was originally based on a play-by-email ("PBEM") game titled Necropolis (on which much of the material in Ruin at The End of The World is based). A second pbem game (Shadow of The Savants) further fleshed out some of the background material for the game's Twisted Earth setting.
- Burning Lands is a post-apocalyptic science-fiction novel set some three centuries after World War III, making use of the "Twisted Earth" setting.

== Reception ==
Darwin's World won the 2002 Gold Ennie Award for "Best d20 Game.
