= Mutant Master (Gamma World) =

Adventure for Gamma World

Mutant Master is a 1992 role-playing adventure for Gamma World published by TSR.

== Plot summary ==
Mutant Master is an adventure in which the player characters must find out what happened to a missing Restorationist agent.

== Reception ==
Gene Alloway reviewed Mutant Master in White Wolf #36 (1993), rating it a 3 out of 5 and stated that "Mutant Master is a quick, entertaining adventure that introduces a group to the new campaign setting for the fourth edition Gamma World system. It is fast paced, exciting, and full of Gamma World's strongest elements: mutants, travel across a familiar yet radically altered landscape, weird, dangerous technology, and high adventure. If you like Gamma World, then this Mutant Master's for you."
