= Heroes of the Feywild =

2011 role-playing game supplement

- Cover of the first edition
- Authors: Rodney Thompson, Claudio Pozas, Steve Townshend
- Language: English
- Subject: Role-playing games
- Genre: Dungeons & Dragons
- Publisher: Wizards of the Coast
- Publication date: 2011
- Publication place: United States
- Media type: Print (Trade hardcover)

Heroes of the Feywild is a supplement for the 4th edition of the Dungeons & Dragons fantasy role-playing game.

== Contents ==
Heroes of the Feywild provides new character theme options, feats, magic items, and more. The book presents three new Feywild races (the Hamadryad, Pixie, and Satyr), and four sets of class alternate features and subclasses: the Berserker (Barbarian subclass), the Skald (Bard subclass), the Protector (Druid subclass), and the Witch (Wizard subclass).

== Publication history ==
Heroes of the Feywild was written by Rodney Thompson, Claudio Pozas, and Steve Townshend, and published by Wizards of the Coast in November 2011. A corresponding deck of fortune cards, Fury of the Feywild, was also released in November 2011.

Shannon Appelcline commented that the seventh season of Encounters, Beyond the Crystal Cave (2011–2012, 13 weeks), was "Another callback to an old AD&D module, this time UK1: Beyond the Crystal Cave (1983). The original adventure is expanded to take adventures into the Feywild and it also references Heroes of the Feywild (2011). Much as with the original adventure, this Season featured considerable roleplaying and puzzles, unlike most of the Encounters."

== Reception ==
Heroes of the Feywild was nominated for the ENnie Award for Best Supplement in 2012.

Andrew Zimmerman-Jones of Black Gate commented: "I love supplements that help to differentiate even more between different types of characters. The Dungeons & Dragons Player's Option book Heroes of the Feywild is superb at doing that for Feywild characters, providing both storytelling details about these engaging character types as well as new mechanics designed to support stories that feature the Feywild. If you want to enter into this world of raw magical power, this is definitely a must-have supplement."

DieHard GameFan said that "Heroes of the Feywild sparked flashes of creativity in me and it just may do the same for you."
