= Magitech (Amazing Engine) =

Magitech is a 1993 role-playing supplement for Amazing Engine published by TSR.

== Contents ==
Magitech is a supplement in which an alternate Earth features magic instead of technology in the 1990s.

== Reception ==
Denys Backriges reviewed Magitech in White Wolf #41 (March, 1994), rating it a 4 out of 5 and stated that "the book is dense at 128 pages and complete enough to keep you plotting for a long time to come. And it had better be complete. TSR doesn't plan to release supplements for any of their Universe Books unless those universes become extremely popular. The question is whether you like this kind of fairytale fantasy."

== Reviews ==
- Windgeflüster (Issue 24 - Dec 1993)
