= The Complete Monstrous Fighter's Compendium =

The Complete Monstrous Fighter's Compendium is a 2003 role-playing game supplement for d20 System published by Fast Forward Entertainment.

== Contents ==
The Complete Monstrous Fighter's Compendium is a supplement in which a full toolkit for playing goblins, orcs, ogres, drow, and other monstrous warriors offers new races, classes, prestige options, and spells.

== Reviews ==
- Pyramid
- Fictional Reality (Issue 12 – Jun 2003)
- Legions Realm Monthly (Issue 9–May 2003)
