= Ultramodern Firearms =

Role-playing game supplement

Ultramodern Firearms is a 1993 role-playing supplement for Millennium's End published by Chameleon Eclectic Entertainment.

== Contents ==
Ultramodern Firearms is a supplement in which pistols, submachine guns, assault rifles, rifles, shotguns, machine guns, ammunition and sighting devices are covered.

== Reception ==
Allen Mixson reviewed Ultra Modern Fire Arms in White Wolf #38 (1993), rating it a 4 out of 5 and stated that "So, if you want a book that describes modern firearms for use in your game (regardless of which game genre you use), you should... no, you'd better buy Ultra Modern Fire Arms. At this point, nothing else in the gaming industry comes close."

== Reviews ==
- Australian Realms #23
- The Familiar (Issue 5 - Aug 1995)
