= For Faerie, Queen & Country =

Role-playing game supplement

- Publisher: TSR
- Publication date: 1993

For Faerie, Queen & Country is a 1993 role-playing supplement for Amazing Engine published by TSR.

== Contents ==
For Faerie, Queen & Country is a supplement in which a setting is provided based on Great Britain in the 1870s where faeries live.

== Reception ==
Denys Backriges reviewed For Faerie, Queen & Country in White Wolf #37 (July/Aug., 1993), rating it a 3 out of 5 and stated that "Depending on how the GM uses the faeries and other evils available, the game can offer its players high fantasy, arcane fantasy or horror. Magical guilds, mystical secret societies and anarchist plots all combined to form a genuinely original setting. FFQC could be accused of being a Victorian England version of ShadowRun, but that would be unfair. Overall, the game needs more material to be complete. However, for an inventive GM willing to flesh out British society in the 1870's, the game will offer plenty of adventure and roleplaying variety. Just remember to keep a little cold iron in your pocket, and you'll be safe."

== Reviews ==
- The Unspeakable Oath #11
- Windgeflüster (Issue 24 - Dec 1993)
- Casus Belli #77
