= Amazing Engine =

Tabletop role-playing game system

- AM1, Amazing Engine System Guide
- Designers: David "Zeb" Cook
- Publishers: TSR, Inc.
- Publication: 1993
- Genres: Universal

Amazing Engine was a series of tabletop role-playing game books that was published by TSR, Inc. from 1993 until 1994. It was a generic role-playing game system - each publication employed the same minimalist generic rules, as described in the Amazing Engine System Guide, but each world book had an entirely different setting or genre. David "Zeb" Cook was credited with the design of the game rules.

== History ==
In 1993 TSR ended production on most of its role-playing game lines, including Gamma World, Marvel Super Heroes, and Basic Dungeons & Dragons, and replaced these soon after with a new universal game system via the Amazing Engine System Guide (1993). Amazing Engine was intended as a simple system for beginners, TSR began publishing setting books after the initial rulebook, each of them using various play environments. Amazing Engine was cancelled after 1994. TSR planned for Alternity to be their generic science-fiction role-playing system which would replace Amazing Engine.

== Description ==
In Amazing Engine, player characters are generated with a set of four core statistics. The core stats were intended to be migrated from book to book, keeping a general character design concept. These stats were then used to build random ability scores, basic characteristics, and skills. The skills have prerequisites which must first be learned. Skill checks are made using percentile dice.

== Campaign settings ==
Below you'll find summary information for the published worldbooks.

Bughunters
A near future worldbook where the players are clones forced to fight the aliens. Recycled for d20 Future.

For Faerie, Queen & Country
Magical Victorian England with a twist. Magic and Faeries are real. Includes poster map.

The Galactos Barrier
Space opera a la Star Wars (except that instead of "the Force" it is called music).

Kromosome
Biopunk using both traditional cyberware and genetic materials from animals.

Magitech
Dungeons & Dragons meets Earth. Fantasy mixed with the contemporary world. Basically, how the world would be different if magic were real and elves, dwarves, etc. were around.

Metamorphosis Alpha to Omega
Post-apocalyptic science fiction with high technology and mutants - based on Metamorphosis Alpha.

Once and Future King
King Arthur lives in 4485 AD. Space flight, combat armor.

Tabloid!
A spoof comedy world where you are reporters for a sensationalist newspaper like the ones referenced in the film 'Men In Black'. Also like the film, it's all true. The Loch Ness monster is an alien, Elvis is alive and well etc.

== Reviews ==
- Casus Belli #76 (in French)
