= Mutant Future =

Post-apocalyptic tabletop role-playing game

- First edition cover
- Designers: Daniel Proctor and Ryan Denison
- Publishers: Goblinoid Games
- Publication: 2008 (original); 2010 (Revised Edition)
- Years active: 2008-present
- Genres: Science fantasy
- Skills: Role-playing, improvisation, tactics, arithmetic
- Website: http://goblinoidgames.com/index.php/products/

Mutant Future is a post-apocalyptic, science fantasy role-playing game created by Daniel Proctor and Ryan Denison and published by Goblinoid Games. The game is compatible with Labyrinth Lord, which emulates the rules of classic era Dungeons & Dragons (D&D) using the Open Game License (OGL) from Wizards of the Coast. The game is thematically patterned after genre predecessors such as Metamorphosis Alpha and its more widely known and published follow-up, Gamma World.

== Distribution ==
Mutant Future Revised Edition

Mutant Future is the second offering published by Goblinoid Games under the Open Gaming License (OGL), providing non-game publishers the ability to develop derivative content with few restrictions. While the game is not a true retro-clone, it nevertheless emulates gameplay of role-playing games from the "classic" (late 1970s and early 1980s) era.

== Setting ==
The in-game setting of Mutant Future is one of post-apocalyptic science fiction tropes, including global post-nuclear radiation, genetic mutation, dystopian societies, and advanced technology. Players choose from a variety of mutant animals, humans or plants; robots; and un-mutated "pure" human characters to portray.

== Reception ==
Reviews of Mutant Future have been favorable, with prominent old-school renaissance RPG bloggers, including James Maliszewski, who gave the game "5 out of 5 Pole Arms" and wrote positively about the game, saying, "All in all, Mutant Future is a very impressive game. I find it very inspiring and Daniel Proctor and Ryan Denison have given the old school community a huge gift with this product. Firstly, they have preserved not merely a genre that's not seen much play in recent years but also a style. Mutant Future is exuberantly gonzo."
