= Dataware =

1998 roleplaying game supplement

- Publisher: TSR
- Publication date: 1998

Dataware is a 1998 role-playing game supplement published by TSR for Alternity.

== Contents ==
Dataware is a supplement about computers, artificial intelligence, and robots.

== Reviews ==
- SF Site
- Backstab #12
- Casus Belli #117
