= Treasures of the Ancients =

Treasures of the Ancients is a 1993 role-playing supplement for Gamma World published by TSR.

== Contents ==
Treasures of the Ancients is a supplement in which the technological gear of the setting is detailed.

== Reception ==
Gene Alloway reviewed Treasures of the Ancients in White Wolf #37 (July/Aug., 1993), rating it a 3 out of 5 and stated that "Though originally part of the Gamma World book in 3rd edition, Treasures of the Ancients is reasonably priced and well-done. It is indispensable for the Gamma World universe, and somewhat useful for other TSR products. There is a lot of high-tech in here, and a few of the higher end things in a low tech environment could make things interesting, especially if the players aren't the ones with the tech."

== Reviews ==
- Action Check #8 (Jan., 2001)
- Papyrus (Issue 16 - April Fools 1995)
