= Gamemaster Guide =

1998 role-playing game supplement

Gamemaster Guide is a 1998 role-playing game supplement published by TSR for Alternity.

== Contents ==
Gamemaster Guide is a supplement of a science-fiction role-playing system.

== Publication history ==
Shannon Appelcline commented that "Rather uniquely, the Alternity Player Handbook was released in a limited edition (1997) at the 1997 Gen Con Game Fair, and then in a regular edition (1998) — along with the Alternity Gamemaster Guide (1998) — the next spring. The reason for the first release being limited was — of course — the death and rebirth of TSR, but the delay also gave Wizards the chance to get feedback on the original printing and revise the system a bit before its full roll-out."

The Gamemaster Guide was published in May 1998.

== Reviews ==
- InQuest Gamer #39
- Backstab #10
- Dragon (German Issue 4 - Sep/Oct 1999)
