= Terror/Counter Terror Sourcebook =

Terror/Counter Terror Sourcebook is a 1996 role-playing game supplement published by Chameleon Eclectic Entertainment for Millennium's End.

== Contents ==
Terror/Counter Terror Sourcebook is a supplement in which an in-depth exploration of terrorism and counterterrorism for roleplaying scenarios is set in a near-future techno-thriller world. Structured into four major sections, it first outlines the philosophies, structures, and tactics of terrorist groups in "The Threat". The core of the book, "Terrorist Organizations", profiles fifteen active groups, offering detailed insights into their histories, goals, and operations. In contrast, "CounterTerrorist Agencies" presents six elite units tasked with combating such threats. The "Resources" chapter provides adventure hooks, maps (including a safe house, camp, and airliner), NPCs, and operational details for game masters to build compelling stories. An appendix rounds out the guide with an overview of weapons of mass destruction employed by terrorists.

== Reception ==
Andy Butcher reviewed Terror/Counter Terror Sourcebook for Arcane magazine, rating it a 7 out of 10 overall, and stated that "The Terror/CounterTerror Sourcebook is a well-designed mixture of painstaking research and fiction, and provides a wealth of ideas and inspiration. There's more than enough information here to run a whole campaign based around counter-terrorism, or simply to introduce some terrorist actions to an existing game. Even if you don't play Millennium's End itself, the bulk of this book could be used in any near-future game to add a harder edge to your stories. The only real drawback is the book's tight focus, but if you want to know how to use terrorism in your games, look no further."

== Reviews ==
- Rollespilsmagasinet Fønix (Issue 17 - June 1997)
