= Rodney Thompson =

American game designer

- Occupation: Author
- Writing career
- Subject: Role-playing games
- Notable work: Star Wars Roleplaying Game (Wizards of the Coast)

Rodney Thompson is a game designer whose writing credits include numerous books for the Star Wars Roleplaying Game and the Dungeons & Dragons fantasy role-playing game. He was the lead developer for the 4th edition version of the Dark Sun campaign setting.

== Bibliography ==
=== Wizards of the Coast ===
==== d20 Modern ====
- d20 Future
- d20 Future Tech

==== Dungeons & Dragons ====
===== 3rd edition =====
- Dragon Magic

===== 4th Edition =====
- Dark Sun Campaign Setting
- Heroes of the Fallen Lands
- Heroes of the Forgotten Kingdoms
- Monster Vault
- Player's Option: Heroes of the Feywild

==== Star Wars Roleplaying Game ====
===== Revised Core Rulebook edition =====
- Hero's Guide

===== Saga Edition =====
- Star Wars Roleplaying Game: Saga Edition
- Starships of the Galaxy (Saga Edition)
- Star Wars Gamemaster Screen
- Threats of the Galaxy
- Knights of the Old Republic Campaign Guide
- Force Unleashed Campaign Guide
- Scum and Villainy
- The Clone Wars Campaign Guide
- Legacy Era Campaign Guide
- Jedi Academy Training Manual
- Rebellion Era Campaign Guide
- Galaxy At War
- Scavenger's Guide to Droids
- Galaxy of Intrigue
- The Unknown Regions

=== Green Ronin Publishing ===
==== Generic d20 ====
- The Noble's Handbook
- Dirge of the Damned

==== Future ====
- Future Players Companion

==== Freeport Setting ====
- Crisis in Freeport
- Buccaneers in Freeport

=== Alderac Entertainment Group ===
- Stargate SG-1 Role Playing Game

=== Board games ===
- Tyrants of the Underdark
- Lords of Waterdeep
- Dungeon Command

=== Scratchpad Publishing ===
- Dusk City Outlaws
- Spectaculars

== Media Mentions ==
Rodney Thompson has appeared in the following newspaper and magazine articles, websites and podcasts.

=== Podcasts ===
- Order 66 podcast: Thompson has appeared on the following twelve episodes discussing aspects of the Star Wars Saga Edition roleplaying game: April 6, 2008 (The Third GM), May 18, 2008 (When Vader Attacks), July 14, 2008 (Worst Show Ever), November 17, 2008 (The Answer to the Ultimate Question of Life, The Scum of the Universe and Everything), January 12, 2009 (One Year of the Big O!), January 26, 2009 (Grand Rodney of the Republic), March 22, 2009 (Three Men and a Little Legacy), May 10, 2009 (Execute Episode 66), June 1, 2009 (Educating You In The Face), September 2, 2009 (Rodney's Rebel Field Guide), September 28, 2009 (Galaxy at War), December 21, 2009 (BOOM! Infinite Oregano).
