= BlackEagle Operative's Kit =

BlackEagle Operative's Kit is a 1992 role-playing supplement for Millennium's End published by Chameleon Eclectic Entertainment.

== Contents ==
BlackEagle Operative's Kit is a supplement in which the booklets "Tactics and Investigations Handbook" and "Operations Policy Handbook" are included.

== Reception ==
Allen Mixson reviewed Operative's Kit in White Wolf #35 (March/April, 1993), rating it a 4 out of 5 and stated that "I highly recommend the Operative's Kit. It gets high marks for the work and degree of professionalism that Chameleon Eclectic puts into it, and the fact that the Tactics and Investigations Handbook can actually be used in real-life situations."
