= Famine In Far-Go =

1982 role-playing game supplement

Famine In Far-Go is a 1982 role-playing game adventure published by TSR for Gamma World.

== Plot summary ==
Famine In Far-Go is an adventure in which the player characters must uncover the cause of a devastating famine and find a cure. Designed as a rite of passage, the adventure offers a broad area for exploration. The module introduces six new creatures, two robotic units, three artifacts, five mutations, and updated rules to improve Pure Strain Human characters.

GW2, Famine in Far-Go has the player characters embarking on their Rite of Adulthood face a bizarre and dangerous obstacle — radioactive mutant chickens. Along the way, they navigate wilderness encounters using first-edition Gamma World rules.

== Publication history ==
Famine In Far-Go was written by Michael Price, with a cover by Jim Holloway and illustrations by Tim Truman and Jeff Easley, and was published by TSR in 1982 as a 32-page book with an outer folder.

Famine In Far-Go was the second Gamma World module published by TSR.

== Reception ==
Russell Grant Collins reviewed Famine In Far-Go for Different Worlds magazine and stated that "Despite my gripes [...] I recommend this module to any beginning Gamma World gamemaster and any other Gamma World gamemaster willing to do whatever work might be needed to fit it into his campaign (which may be nothing more than placing the more vital encounters of the adventure into her land). Even if the gamemaster thinks he will have to do a lot of fiddling to blend this adventure into his land, the new rules are valuable."
