= Millennium's End =

Tabletop role-playing game

Millennium's End is a role-playing game published in 1991 by Chameleon Eclectic Entertainment.

== Publications ==
The adventure Nightwalker/The Villee Affair was published in 1991, and BlackEagle Operative's Kit and the GM Screen and 1999 Datasource were published in 1992, while Ultramodern Firearms was published in 1993 and the Terror/Counter Terror Sourcebook was published in 1996.

== Description ==
Millennium's End is a technothriller role-playing game set in the year 1999.

== Reception ==
Allen Mixson reviewed Millennium's End in White Wolf #28 (Aug./Sept., 1991), rating it a 4 out of 5 and stated that "The game is a creative blend of reality with just the right amount of fiction and technology. The polymer overlays are great. I know people who would buy the book just for those. For a game that offers as much as games twice its price, it's a steal."

Allen Mixson reviewed Millennium's End, Version 2.0 in White Wolf #46 (Aug., 1994), rating it a 4.5 out of 5 and stated that "Millennium's End is an excellent product. It's precise, imaginative, coherent and flexible. As I said of the first edition: it is a creative blend of reality, fiction and technology."

Millennium's End was ranked 31st in the 1996 reader poll of Arcane magazine to determine the 50 most popular roleplaying games of all time. The UK magazine's editor Paul Pettengale commented: "Millennium's End struggles hard to cut the right balance between fiction and reality, and just manages it. The game system is detailed, but this allows it to model the style of fiction it's based on with more accuracy. Players carry out investigations, espionage, and paramilitary operations, all of which are ably supported."

== Reviews ==
- Rollespilsmagasinet Fønix (Danish) (Issue 8 - May/June 1995)
- Shadis #13 (May, 1994)
- Shadis #32 (1996)
- Australian Realms #23
- Polyhedron #83
- Abyss Quarterly #50 (Winter, 1992)

== Supplements ==
GM Screen and 1999 Datasource is a 1992 role-playing supplement for Millennium's End in which a gamemaster's screen, hit location tables, two character sheets and the "1999 Datasource" booklet are included.

Allen Mixson reviewed it in White Wolf #35 (March/April, 1993), rating it a 4 out of 5 and stated that "Production is clean and crisp, reflecting Chameleon Eclectic's commitment to quality. If you are a Millennium's End gamer, this product is well worth the price."
