= The Galactos Barrier =

The Galactos Barrier is a 1993 role-playing supplement for Amazing Engine published by TSR.

== Contents ==
The Galactos Barrier is a supplement in which the player characters oppose a corrupt empire.

== Publication history ==
The Galactos Barrier was the fourth Universe Book released for Amazing Engine.

== Reception ==
Denys Bakriges reviewed The Galactos Barrier in White Wolf #47 (Sept., 1994), rating it a 2.5 out of 5 and stated that "With the price reduction of the Universe Books, the value of these products is greatly increased. For [the price] you get a complete game - all the rules necessary to play are included."

== Reviews ==
- Roleplayer Independent (Volume 2, Issue 4 - Aug 1994)
