= Urban Arcana =

Tabletop role-playing game supplement

- The Urban Arcana Campaign Setting
- Designers: Bill Slavicsek, Jeff Grubb, Eric Cagle, Dave Noonan, Stan!
- Publishers: Wizards of the Coast
- Publication: 2003
- Genres: Modern Fantasy
- Systems: d20 system, modified (d20 Modern)

Urban Arcana is a campaign setting for the d20 Modern roleplaying game that builds on a small campaign model included in the original rulebook. It adds much in the way of magic and monsters to the game, and contains rules for things such as playing Shadowkind characters.

== History ==
The core book for Wizards of the Coast's d20 Modern Roleplaying Game (2002) included information on the modern day fantasy setting "Urban Arcana". Wizards later developed this into a full setting sourcebook of its own: the Urban Arcana Campaign Setting (2003).

== Description ==
In the world of Urban Arcana, dragons rule the boardrooms and bugbears rule the streets. It is a world where monsters and magic exist, yet the human psyche just cannot fathom them and covers up all supernatural events. Some, however, break that barrier and become aware of the world around them and help Mages, Acolytes, and other magical characters fight with monsters from another realm.

== Reviews ==
- Pyramid
- SF Site
- Coleção Dragão Brasil
- Realms of Fantasy
