= The Deva Spark =

Dungeons & Dragons adventure module

- Rules required: Advanced Dungeons & Dragons 2nd edition
- Character levels: 5 - 9
- Campaign setting: Planescape
- Authors: Bill Slavicsek and J.M. Salsbury
- First published: 1994

The Deva Spark is an adventure module for the 2nd edition of the Advanced Dungeons & Dragons fantasy role-playing game.

== Plot summary ==
The Deva Spark is a 32-page scenario for the Planescape setting.

== Publication history ==
The Deva Spark was written by Bill Slavicsek and J.M. Salsbury, and published by TSR, Inc.

== Reception ==
Rick Swan reviewed The Deva Spark for Dragon magazine #218 (June 1995). He commented that: "Nothing aggravates me more than an RPG adventure with a flabby climax; after slogging through a book's worth of fight scenes and dungeon crawls, I want to be dazzled. So bravo to The Deva Spark". Swan concluded by saying: "The final chapter is a knock-out, a sensational blend of surreal characters and obstacles, building to a climax of surprising impact. The rest of the trip's nothing to sneeze at either".
