= Nightwalker/The Villee Affair =

1991 role-playing game adventure

Nightwalker/The Villee Affair is a 1991 role-playing adventure for Millennium's End published by Chameleon Eclectic Entertainment.

== Plot summary ==
Nightwalker/The Villee Affair is an adventure in which "The Villee Affair" consists of the linked adventures "Wake of the Sagittarian" and "The Villee Affair", and "Nightwalker" is a complete adventure.

== Publication history ==
Nightwalker/The Villee Affair was the second product published by Chameleon Eclectic Entertainment.

== Reception ==
Allen Mixson reviewed Nightwalker/The Villee Affair in White Wolf #33 (Sept./Oct., 1992), rating it a 4 out of 5 and stated that "For ingenuity, plot and playability, this is one of the best adventure books I've seen."

== Reviews ==
- The Last Province (Issue 1–Oct 1992)
