= Outbound: An Explorer's Guide =

Outbound: An Explorer's Guide is a 1999 role-playing game supplement published by TSR for Alternity.

== Contents ==
Outbound: An Explorer's Guide is a supplement for scouts and heroes who explore the frontier known as the Verge.

== Reviews ==
- SF Site
- Backstab #15
