= Once & Future King =

1994 role-playing game supplement

Once & Future King is a 1994 role-playing supplement for Amazing Engine published by TSR.

== Contents ==
Once & Future King is a supplement in which King Arthur and his knights quest in the 45th century.

== Reception ==
Denys Bakriges reviewed Once & Future King in White Wolf #48 (Oct., 1994), rating it a 4 out of 5 and stated that "The supplement is an excellent value now that TSR has decreased AE prices. Unlike other AE supplements, this universe book includes a large adventure. You can be up and running Once & Future King in no time at all."

== Reviews ==
- Dosdediez (Número 4 - May/Jun 1994)
