= Star*Drive Arms & Equipment Guide =

Star*Drive Arms & Equipment Guide is a 1998 role-playing game supplement published by TSR for Alternity.

== Contents ==
Star*Drive Arms & Equipment Guide is a supplement in which hundreds of items are detailed.

== Reviews ==
- Backstab #11
- SF Site
