= Monster Vault =

2010 role-playing game supplement

- Genre: Role-playing game
- Publisher: Wizards of the Coast
- Publication date: 2010
- Media type: Print
- ISBN: 978-0786956319

Monster Vault is a supplement to the 4th edition of the Dungeons & Dragons role-playing game.

== Contents ==
Monster Vault collects the monsters of the Dungeons & Dragons world in one box and presents all-new variants, including new spins on such monsters as dragons, orcs, and vampires. In addition to combat statistics, each monster entry comes with story information to help DMs incorporate the monsters into their adventures and campaigns. This box also contains die-cut tokens for the monsters that appear within, as well as a 32-page adventure that showcases several of the monsters.

== Publication history ==
Monster Vault was written by Logan Bonner, Matthew Sernett, and Rodney Thompson, and published in 2010.

Shannon Appelcline commented on Essentials, the last significant expansion in 2010 for Fourth Edition Dungeons & Dragons: "Trade paperbacks like Heroes of the Fallen Lands (2010) offered rules for a variety of character classes in a trade paperback that was about half the price of one of fourth edition’s hardcover books; while other boxed sets like Monster Vault (2010) added to the board-game like components of 4e by including not just a book of monsters but also tokens to represent those monsters in-game. Besides making D&D cheaper and simpler for new players, Essentials also walked back some of the changes made by the 4e rules, such as getting rid of fighters' daily powers, to once more increase the differentiation between fighter and spellcaster classes."

== Reception ==
Monster Vault received the silver ENnie Award for Best Monster/Adversary.
