= The Overlord of Bonparr =

The Overlord of Bonparr is a 1993 role-playing supplement for Gamma World published by TSR.

== Contents ==
The Overlord of Bonparr is a supplement in which the kingdom of Bonparr in Indiana and Ohio is detailed.

== Reception ==
Gene Alloway reviewed The Overlord of Bonparr in White Wolf #37 (July/Aug., 1993), rating it a 3 out of 5 and stated that "The Overlord of Bonparr is a good example of a serious approach to Gamma World gaming. The story is vivid and adds a lot to the game in general. In effect, it is a macrocosm of all the problems the altered and mutated races face in the post-holocaust world. With just a few changes, a large amount of the information can be used in any other Gamma World campaign, adding depth and variety. I recommend this product to Gamma World players."
