= D20 Menace Manual =

Role-playing game system supplement

Cover art by Dave Johnson

d20 Menace Manual is a sourcebook published by Wizards of the Coast (WotC) in 2003 for the role-playing game system d20 Modern that describes various creatures, non-player characters, and factions with which players might interact.

== Description ==
d20 Menace Manual is analogous to the Monster Manual used in Dungeons & Dragons, providing the gamemaster with pre-generated "monsters" usable in a d20 Modern campaign. The book is divided into three sections:

1. Creatures, varying from ordinary animals such as chimpanzees and anacondas to dinosaurs and monsters drawn from science fiction and horror
2. Non-player characters such as Burglar, Government Agent, and ER physician
3. Factions and organizations both real (FBI and FEMA) and fictional (Crimson Scorpion and The Nautilus Club)

The book also includes an index of all creatures ranked by challenge rating.

== Publication history ==
After publishing a third edition of Dungeons & Dragons in 2000, WotC took the non-fantasy portions of the rules and created the d20 Modern rules in 2002, usable for science fiction, steam punk, and modern-day role-playing games. The following year, WotC released d20 Menace Manual, providing gamemasters with pre-generated encounters. The 224-page book was designed by J.D. Wiker, Eric Cagle and Matthew Sernett, with additional material by Christopher Perkins, interior artwork by Jason Shawn Alexander, Kalman Andrasofszky, Joachim Barrum, Ted Beargeon, Cynthia Fliege, Langdon Foss, Frazer Irving, Dave Johnson, Dennis Kauth, Karl Kerschl, Chester Lawrence, Rob Lazzaretti, Kagan McCloud, Raven Mimura, Mikael Noguchi, Dean Ormston, Jake Parker, Zak Plucinski, Scott Schomburg, Joel Thomas, Jonathan Wayshak, and Sam Wood, cartography by Rob Lazzaretti and Dennis Kauth, and cover art by Dave Johnson.

== Reception ==
Pyramid noted that most of the creatures listed were "just animals", and many of the other creatures such as dinosaurs, science fiction aliens, and horror creatures had been culled from previously published WotC sources.

== Other reviews ==
- Legions Realm Monthly #15 (p. 18)
