= Owen K.C. Stephens =

American role-playing game designer

- Born: Owen K.C. Stephens
- Occupation: Game designer
- Spouse: Lj Stephens
- Writing career
- Genre: Role-playing games
- Website: www.owenkcstephens.com

Owen K.C. Stephens (born October 28, 1970) is a game designer who has worked on a number of products for the Starfinder, Pathfinder and Star Wars Roleplaying Game and other games.

== Career ==
In 2000, Wizards of the Coast brought Owen K.C. Stephens on as a designer for the launch of the Star Wars Roleplaying Game. He was laid off with numerous other designers in 2001, and became a freelance designer.

After OtherWorld Creations (under the name Super Genius Games) began updating their d20 books to the Pathfinder rules system in 2009, they brought Stephens onboard as a line manager for Pathfinder.

Stephens has done design work for the Star Wars Roleplaying Game (Wizards of the Coast), Pathfinder Roleplaying Game, Starfinder Roleplaying Game, d20 Modern (Wizards of the Coast), EverQuest Role-Playing Game, The Black Company Roleplaying Game, The Wheel of Time Roleplaying Game, Gamma World Sixth Edition, as well as Dungeons & Dragons material appearing in Dragon magazine and NeoExodus: A House Divided.

He is a Developer for Paizo Publishing and Green Ronin Publishing, and the owner and Publisher for Rogue Genius Games. He is also the Master of Ceremonies for Paizo's annual talent context, RPG Superstar. He is the Starfinder Design Lead.

== Awards and honors ==
"Black Company"

- 2003 EN World "ENnie" Award - Best Campaign Setting or Setting Supplement

"Star Wars Saga Edition"

- 2008 En World "ENnie" Award - Best Rules, Best d20/d20 OGL Product, Best Game, Product of the Year

"Pathfinder Roleplaying Game: Bestiary 2"

- 2011 En World "ENnie" Award - Best Monster/Adversary

"Pathfinder Roleplaying Game: Advanced Player's Guide"

- 2011 En World "ENnie" Award - Best Supplement

"Razor Coast: Heart of the Razor"

- 2014 En World "ENnie" Award - Best Adventure

"Southlands Campaign Setting"

- 2016 En World "ENnie" Award - Best Setting

== Media mentions ==
Owen K.C. Stephens has appeared in the following newspaper and magazine articles, websites and podcasts.

=== Podcasts ===
- Demiplane of Gaming: Stephens was one of the two hosts of the RPG-oriented Demiplane of Gaming, which ran from 2012 to 2014.
- RPG Countdown: Stephens appeared on these episodes: 18 December 2009 (The Genius Guide to the Dragonrider); 29 January 2010 (The Genius Guide to Feats of Spellcasting); 26 February 2010 (The Genius Guide to the War Master).

=== Websites ===
- Robot Viking Owen appeared in this interview: Owen K.C. Stephens: RPG Super Genius
- Rite Publishing Owen appeared in this interview: Fridays & Functions 10 Questions with Owen K.C. Stephens
- The Encounter Table Owen appeared in this interview: Owen K. C. Stephens.
