= Mutant (role-playing game 1984) =

Tabletop fantasy role-playing game

Mutant 1984
- 1984 version box cover
- Publishers: Target Games
- Publication: 1984
- Genres: post-apocalypse
- Systems: Basic Role-Playing; Custom

Mutant (also called Old Mutant, after the release of a newer version in 1989 that came to be called New Mutant) is the first role-playing game in the Mutant series, published by Target Games in 1984. The game puts the players in a post-apocalyptic Sweden. With the game came also the introduction adventure Mission in Mos Mosel. (Swedish: Uppdrag i Mos Mosel.)

== History ==
Mutant (1984) was the second role-playing game published by Target Games, and the rules were based on the Basic Role-Playing system, and its post-apocalyptic Scandinavian setting was populated by mutant humans and animals.

== Game environment ==
Mutant is played out in a distant future after the big catastrophe. After a space probe returns to Earth from Mars with surface samples, which turn out to contain an incurable disease that causes an epidemic, human civilization collapses. The survivors shut themselves into isolated enclaves and during this time start to experiment with animals and human genetics before releasing them into the world outside the enclave to see if they can survive (the origins of the game's mutants). Some of the released experiments managed to survive to become the ancestors of the game's mutant population. As the various enclaves break their isolation and make contact with the other surviving enclaves, conflict breaks out between them eventually leading to a final nuclear war that ends the old world's high-tech society.

The only survivors from the old world are the few humans that were put into cryogenic sleep, cyborgs and androids. Hundreds of years later, society is slowly being rebuilt by the mutated humans and animals along with the few non-mutated humans. The game takes place in a futuristic Sweden, though the country of Sweden no longer exists as it is now divided into several smaller nations such as Pyrisamfundet for example. Areas that were exposed to the virus, chemical and/or radioactivity during the fall and the war are known as forbidden zones as they contain dangerous and strange mutated animals alongside still dangerous and active technology. It is also there where the most interesting finds can be found since its relatively undisturbed areas of old world high technology piquing the interest of those that dare the dangers they contain.

=== Classes ===
The role-players can be one of several classes.

- NMH – Non-mutated human, a human that has avoided becoming mutated.
- PMH – Physically mutated human. A human that has gained one or more physical mutations due to radiation and other gene-changing substances that their ancestors were exposed to such as two extra arms. This also includes various defects.
- PSY – Psychically mutated human whose mutation and defects are of the mind, such as telepathy and telekinesis. These mutants are feared by others due to their mind powers so they usually hide by pretending to be normal humans due to that.
- FMA – Physically mutated animal. An animal that has mutated to the point it has developed intelligence and the ability to speak. Its mutations are similar to physically mutated humans in what mutations and defects they may have.
- MMA – Psychically mutated animal. An animal that has mutated to the point it has developed intelligence and the ability to speak. Its mutations are similar to psychically mutated humans in what mutations and defects they may have.
- RBT – Robot. A humanlike robot that survived the catastrophe. Almost indistinguishable to a normal human on the surface. In accordance with the Three Laws of Robotics they cannot consciously harm humans, mutants are not included in that.

The game got some more classes later on as follows:

- CYB – Cyborg. Beings that originated from before the catastrophe and are a combination of a biological human and high technology.
- CFH – Cryogenic frozen human (Humans whose origins were from before the catastrophe and slept through both the catastrophe and the war in cryogenic sleep).
- RBH – Robotic human (A human brain contained in a robotic body).

== Expansions ==
The expansions-module Mutant 2 contained some more detailed rules, such as battle and a system of damage to separate body parts (a side effect to this was that the players became much more vulnerable and could take less damage). Mutant 2 also introduced more high tech into the world like the class Cryogenic frozen human. The class "Cyborg" was introduced through the rpg magazine Sinkadus. After Target Games released a new version of Mutant in 1989 with a new world and backstory, the 1984 version became more known as the "old Mutant" to keep the two separated.

=== List of published material ===
- Mutant – basic rules (1984)
- Mutant 2 – expansions module (1986)
- After Ragnarok – Campaign module (1987)
- In the reptile men's claws – Adventure (1985)
- The Ironring – Adventure (1985)
- Nekropolis (Grå döden 1) – Adventure (1985)
- Bris Dock (Grå döden 2) – Adventure (1986)
- Focal point Hindenburg – Adventure (1988)
- The Guardian of the Catastrophe – Adventure (1988)
