= Bill Slavicsek =

Role-playing game designer

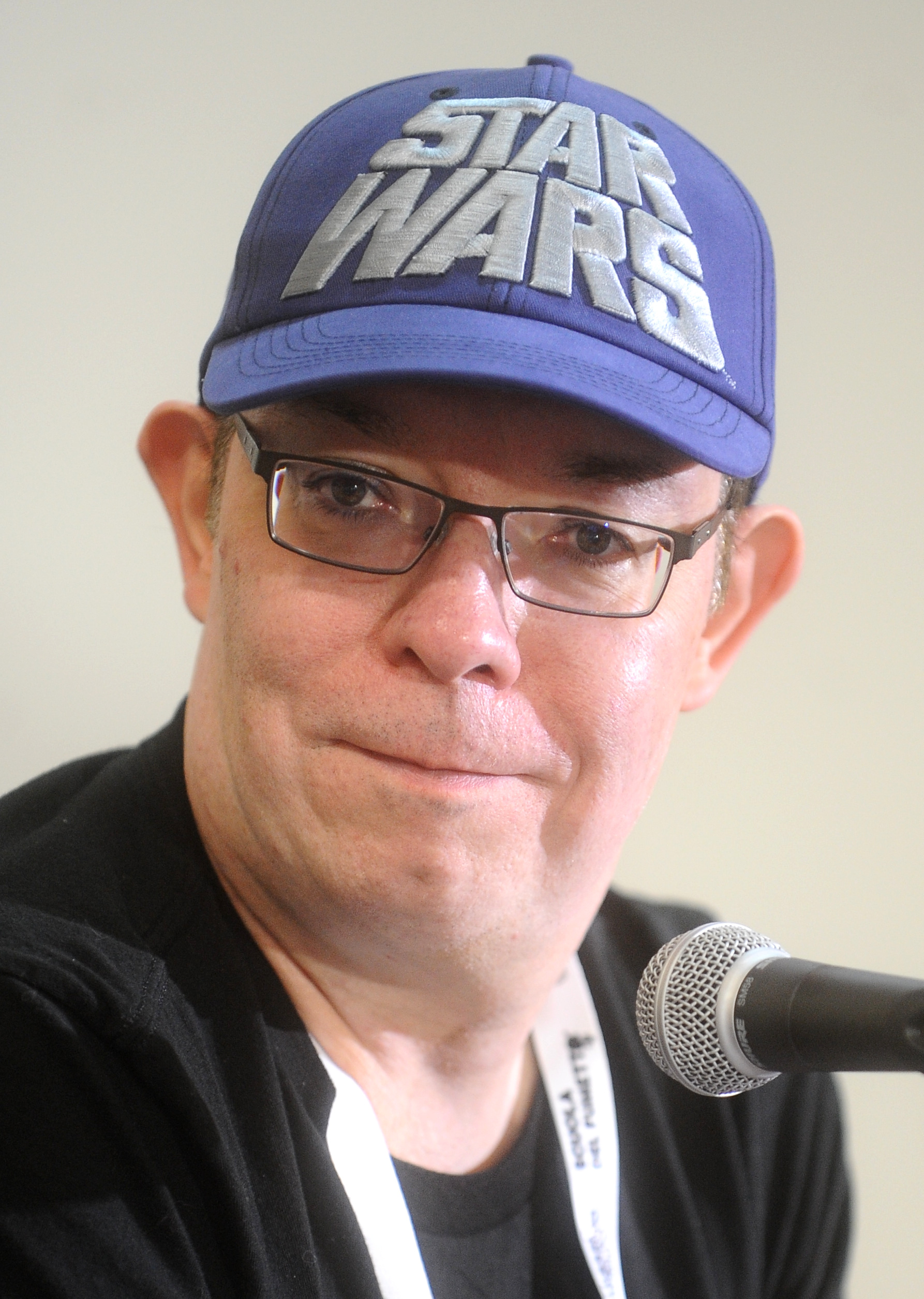
- Born: Bill Slavicsek; October 6, 1971 (age 55); New York City, U.S.
- Occupation: Game designer
- Spouse: Michelle Carter
- Writing career
- Genre: Role-playing games

Bill Slavicsek (born October 6, 1971) is an American game designer and writer who served as the Director of Roleplaying Design and Development at Wizards of the Coast. He previously worked for West End Games and TSR, Inc., and designed products for Dungeons & Dragons, Star Wars, Alternity, Torg, Paranoia and Ghostbusters.

== Biography ==
=== Early life ===
Bill Slavicsek was born and raised in New York City. Slavicsek was a comic book, horror, and science fiction fan as a boy: "Some of my earliest memories involve looking at issues of Marvel Comics, drawing my own comics, and watching old SF and horror movies on TV". Interested in gaming from an early age, Slavicsek was introduced to role-playing games in 1977 when he discovered Dungeons & Dragons. Originally intending to pursue a career as a comic book artist, Slavicsek switched to journalism and communication at St. John's University.

=== West End Games ===
After working for a year at a community newspaper, Slavicsek was hired by West End Games as an editor in 1986. In 1987, the company secured the license to publish a Star Wars roleplaying game, a project which Slavicsek oversaw as an editor and developer. Slavicsek supervised the Star Wars line for the first year of its publication. In 1988, he was promoted to Creative and Editorial Director for WEG. He co-created the Torg game with Greg Gorden, published in 1990, and co-authored the novel Stormknights, which was set in the Torg universe. In 1990, Slavicsek left West End.

=== TSR ===
In 1991, Slavicsek began working as a freelancer, and was hired as a designer/editor by TSR in 1993. At TSR, he designed the Alternity game with Rich Baker, as well as the Dark Sun Campaign Setting, Expanded and Revised, and The Nightmare Lands for the Ravenloft setting.

"Some of my personal bests include the pair of Planescape adventures I wrote - The Deva Spark and Harbinger House... Planescape brought out the best in the people who worked on it. I'm also extremely proud of the Alternity game system. I worked with a great team that featured my co-designer Rich Baker, editor Kim Mohan, David Eckelberry, Jim Butler, and the great visual contributions of rk post."

For much of the 1990s, he was working simultaneously for both WEG and TSR as an editor and designer on various projects. He wrote A Guide to the Star Wars Universe, a definitive reference to Star Wars movies, books, and games, which was published by Del Rey in 1994. Slavicsek is considered one of the world's leading experts on Star Wars, and has written the second and third editions of A Guide to the Star Wars Universe. In 1997, TSR was acquired by Wizards of the Coast.

=== Wizards of the Coast ===
By the end of 1997, Slavicsek was the Director of the TSR Product Group for Wizards of the Coast; that job was later divided in two, making him the Director of Roleplaying Game design. Wizards' CEO and founder Peter Adkison selected him to be the head of role-playing game research and development. While at TSR, Richard Baker and Slavicsek designed the Alternity sci-fi role-playing game to replace Amazing Engine, and Wizards published the game in 1997. Adkison left the third edition Dungeons & Dragons design work for Wizards of the Coast to Slavicsek and a group of other former employees of TSR. Hasbro, Wizards' parent company, asked Wizards in December 2000 to cut 10% of its staff; Slavicsek was the "Director of Category" in charge of a team of roughly 60 people, and he made the decision to shut down the Los Angeles office of the remaining Last Unicorn Games division. By the time of the publication of Wizards' d20 edition of the Star Wars Roleplaying Game in 2000, Slavicsek held the title of Vice President and Director of RPG R&D for Wizards of the Coast. Keith Baker produced the Eberron Campaign Setting (2004) with James Wyatt and Slavicsek. As the Director of R&D for Dungeons & Dragons, Slavicsek began looking into a fourth edition of D&D as early as 2005, when he created a team to begin work on early designs, led by Rob Heinsoo with collaborative efforts from Wyatt and Andy Collins. In 2010, Slavicsek and Mike Mearls designed the Castle Ravenloft Board Game. The following year, Slavicsek left Wizards of the Coast.

=== After Wizards of the Coast ===
Slavicsek became a writer and content designer at ZeniMax Online Studios, which developed and released The Elder Scrolls Online MMORPG.

== Selected bibliography ==
=== Novels ===
- The Mark of Nerath (2010)

== Media appearances ==
Bill Slavicsek has appeared in the following newspaper and magazine articles, websites and podcasts.

=== Podcasts ===
- RPG Countdown: 11 March 2009 "Dungeon Delve"
- Never Tell Me the Pods: 21 September 2016 "Episode 25 - May The Source Be With You (Bill Slavicsek)"
