= The Mind Masters =

Tabletop role-playing game supplement

The Mind Masters is a 1983 role-playing game adventure for Gamma World published by TSR.

== Plot summary ==
The Mind Masters is an adventure in which the player characters go to explore a large trove of artifacts.

== Publication history ==
The Mind Masters was the fourth adventure published for Gamma World.

== Reception ==
Chris Baylis reviewed The Mind Masters for Imagine magazine, and stated that "The impressive cover, good production and artwork fail to hide this time-wasting scenario TSR have released for the Gamma World game."

Steve Crow reviewed The Mind Masters in Space Gamer No. 70. Crow commented that "While I would recommend this module to any gamemaster looking for new and different ways to challenge his players, I would advise that the gamemaster must be very experienced, as he or she is going to have to fill in the many gaps in the play sequence. The Mind Masters is definitely the best of the Gamma World modules to come out, despite its flaws, but be advised that there are holes that will have to be navigated to get to the good parts."
