= Ship of Fools (Psychosis) =

Ship of Fools is a 1993 role-playing supplement for Psychosis published by Chameleon Eclectic Entertainment.

== Contents ==
Ship of Fools is a supplement in which the Psychosis role-playing game was introduced.

== Publication history ==
As the first Psychosis campaign book, it was a perfect-bound digest-sized book with the full game rules.

== Reception ==
Cullen Bunn reviewed Ship of Fools in White Wolf Inphobia #56 (June, 1995), rating it a 4 out of 5 and stated that "All in all, Psychosis is a good idea that's fairly well executed. It might take a little work and a lot of getting used to, and die-hard roleplaying traditionalists might not like it at all, but it makes for a good change of pace."

Andrew Hartsock reviewed Ship of Fools for Pyramid magazine and stated that "If Ship of Fools has a weak point, it's in its appearance. The cover is nice, conveying the mood of the adventure without giving anything away. And the interior layout is okay, it's just so darn repetitive. Every page has the same little strip of art at the top and the bottom, with another piece of art in the center. The art is good enough, but even the center pieces are recycled occasionally within the book. The effect is that when flipping through Ship of Fools you get the impression that it's boring, which is far from the truth. Don't be fooled. Ship of Fools is a great adventure, one well worth picking up and playing."

== Reviews ==
- Dragon #220 (Aug., 1995)
- Australian Realms #24
- Casus Belli #87
- Rollespilsmagasinet Fønix (Issue 9 - August/September 1995)
- The Familiar (Issue 5 - Aug 1995)
