= Polyhedron (magazine) =

- Issue 167
- Categories: Role-playing games
- Publisher: TSR, Inc, Paizo Publishing
- First issue: May 1981; 45 years ago
- Final issue: August 2004
- Country: United States
- Language: English

Polyhedron (formerly Polyhedron Newszine) was a magazine targeting consumers of role-playing games, and originally the official publication of the RPGA (Role Playing Gamers Association).

== 1981 to 2002 ==
Publication of the Role Playing Gamers Association magazine began in the year 1981, targeting players of the Dungeons & Dragons roleplaying game. Articles were written by gamers for other gamers in the style of the Dragon magazine, and information was included on RPGA membership and events. The magazine was nominally quarterly from May, 1981 through February, 1982; bimonthly from April, 1983 through May, 1991; and monthly from June, 1991 through November, 1996; publication then ceased until October, 1997, and thereafter was bi-monthly (with some irregularity) through May, 2003; finally it was again monthly from June, 2003 until the final issue in August, 2004. For several years it was available only to RPGA members; for some, joining the RPGA essentially amounted to a subscription to Polyhedron. Polyhedron was produced by members of the RPGA, including some professionals working in the game industry, and was intended for RPGA members.

The magazine was initially referred to as the "RPGA Newsletter" (or RPGA News) inside the cover of the initial 4 issues and the title read "TSR RPGA" on the cover. Starting with Issue 4 (p3) the new title "The Polyhedron" would be used. From issue 5 through 9 the covers were titled with "The Polyhedron" and from issue 10 onward as "Polyhedron Newszine".

The masthead lists several formal publishers (occasionally omitting this information) including E. Gary Gygax (Issues 1–11); Kim Eastland (12–15); Mike Cook (irregularly 32–50); Jack Beuttell (51–68); Rick Behling (69-76 and 91–111); James Ward (77–90); TSR (112–141); Wizards of the Coast (irregularly 142–149); and Paizo (153 onward). Notable editors include Frank Mentzer (1–4); Mary Kirchoff (5-21); Penny Petticord (22–31); Skip Williams (33, 34, 37, 39); Jean Rabe (36, 38, 40–103); Dave Gross (104–107); Duane Maxwell (107–118); Jeff Quick (122–134); and Erik Mona (138 onward). Two special issues were also published—an Introductory Issue (Jean Rabe, 1989) that was sent thereafter to new RPGA members, and a Gen Con Issue (Sean Glenn, 1999) that was distributed only at that year's Gen Con. The magazine's publication was fairly erratic and the contents very uneven until Jean Rabe's period as editor where the magazine was put on a regular schedule and contents were developed into recurring topical columns and monthly themed materials. Rabe also strengthened the quality of content and applied more rigorous editing to articles which had previously tended to be somewhat amateurish and personal. During this time, cover art improved markedly and, notably, focused on strongly presented (and fully clothed) female adventurers. Rabe also converted the magazine from bi-monthly to monthly.

Pagination of Polyhedron is problematic, because the mailing wrapper (generally containing printed matter) was often counted in the pagination, thus the cover was often counted in the pagination as well. Given this, the magazine generally was 16-20 pages in length for issues 1–8; 32-36 pages in length for issues 9–128; and 32-48 pages in length for issues 131-143 (at this point, the magazine started to carry advertisements). From issue 144 onwards, page counts became fairly variable but generally ran near to either 40 or 60 pages. Polyhedron featured several notable cover styles, including black and white art on issues 1–39; a single-colored left-hand stripe with hexes on issues 40–51; a single colored cover (retaining the hex stripe) from issues 52–74; single color cover with a cluster of hexes in the top-left corner on issues 78–119; increasingly variable covers on 120–143; and full-glossy covers from 144 onwards. Collectors should note that the magazine was serially issued, but published in volumes as well, and numbered for issues 1–148 and then again for issue 161. However, the volume and numbers printed in the magazine were generally wrong (at least fifteen errors are known during the 148 issues); the issue number should be taken as authoritative.

== 2002 to 2004 ==
In September, 2002, Paizo Publishing acquired publishing rights and merged the Polyhedron magazine with the sister publication Dungeon to form a single magazine (issue 90 of Dungeon and issue 149 of Polyhedron were one and the same magazine, and this dual numbering continued throughout this period). This ended the association of Polyhedron with the RPGA. It also marked a major change in the magazine's focus, from a primarily Dungeons & Dragons-oriented magazine similar to Dragon to a general d20 system magazine that often featured entirely new, simple role-playing games based on this system, along with support for non-D&D d20 games such as d20 Modern. Eventually, another formerly separate magazine, the Living Greyhawk Journal, briefly became a section in Polyhedron as well.

Though this version of Polyhedron had many vocal supporters, sales were poor, a situation many blamed on putting two magazines with distinct target audiences together in one somewhat higher-priced package. The Polyhedron section was removed from Dungeon as part of a major revamp of the latter magazine in 2004 and Polyhedron is no longer published in any form.

== 2005 ==
From March to November, 2005, Wizards of the Coast used the name "Polyhedron" for a Dungeons & Dragons email newsletter with links pointing to content on their website. The newsletter typically contained product reviews and announcements and a cartoon.

== Reception ==
Polyhedron was awarded the Origins Award for "Best Amateur Adventure Gaming Magazine of 1987".

Dungeon/Polyhedron Magazine won the 2002 Gold Ennie Award for "Best Aid or Accessory".
