= Alternity =

Tabletop science fiction role-playing game

- Introductory boxed set cover
- Designers: Bill Slavicsek; Richard Baker
- Publishers: TSR, Inc.
- Publication: 1997; 29 years ago
- Genres: Science fiction
- Systems: Custom

Alternity is a science fiction role-playing game published by TSR, Inc. in 1997. Following the acquisition of TSR by Wizards of the Coast, the game was discontinued in 2000 as part of a broader rationalisation of TSR's business holdings. Parts of Alternity as well as TSR's classic Star Frontiers game were later incorporated into the d20 Modern game, especially the d20 Future setting. Star*Drive was the first campaign setting published for Alternity, and was introduced in 1998.

== System ==
Characters were created with a point-based system, and could be either humans, mutants, one of several alien species presented in the core books, or original aliens created by the games master. Classes were replaced by professions, which dictated what skills and abilities were cheaper for any given hero to get, though a few skills (in particular, psionics) were restricted to specific professions.

Skills are classified into broad and speciality skills. Earning a specialty skill requires an associated broad skill, which requires a character to have sufficient associated ability points. Special skill is further classified into ranks, which affects the skill's scores. Skill scores are presented with the full score, half that score, and one-quarter that score. which represent the numbers needed to achieve Ordinary, Good, or Amazing successes in an action round respectively.

Unlike many other systems, actions are determined by a control die and situation dice. When Gamemaster calls for a roll, player rolls one control die and one situation die. The control die is always a 20-sided die, while situation die can be a 0-, 4-, 6-, 8-, 12-, 20-sided die, where 0-sided die means the action only depends on control die roll. Situation die can be plus die or a minus die, in which the value in the situation die is added to or subtracted from control die value. The total of the rolled numbers is checked against character's action, skill, feat, to indicate a success or a failure. Rolling low is always better for successfully completing an action.

The type of situation die being used depends on the difficulty of the action. Difficulty is scaled in die types of -d20, -d12, -d8, -d6, -d4, +d0, +d4, +d6, +d8, +d12, +d20, +2d20, +3d20. A character's base situation die is +d4 for broad skill or feat check, +d0 for specialty skill or action check. A minus situation bonus means player uses a larger negative situation die set, while a plus situation penalty means a player uses a larger positive situation die set.

In an action round, a round is divided into four phases. Each phase relates to one of the degrees of success that are achievable on an action check: Amazing, Good, Ordinary, and Marginal, in order from the first phase to the last. A hero can attempt only one action per phase. Acting orders of characters are determined by a d20 die roll for all participants, which determines the earliest phase in which a character can act. All actions in a phase are considered to occur simultaneously, with the results of those actions being applied at the end of the phase. A character can act in as many phases as it has actions per round.

Depending on how far below the skill score the player rolled, there are three progressively better layers of success and two levels of failure. An action is determined using this same system, making the game very uniform. Only armor rolls and damage rolls did not use the d20.

Durability, is categorized into Stun, Wound, and Mortal damage. Stun damage can immobilize a character, but is not life-threatening. They are restored at the end of a scene. Wound damage can immobilize a character and inflicts one stun damage point for every two wound damage points received. It can be recovered by resting. Mortal damage can kill a character, and inflicts one stun and one wound damage point for every two mortal damage points received. It can be restored by use of the Medical Science–surgery skill. Durabilities can also be repaired by healing.

It was designed to be a generic rule set around which a campaign world could be built. It was not very heavily marketed and suffered from mediocre sales. Increased focus on the d20 system led to the discontinuation of the game in 2000.

Much of the content of the Alternity game has been absorbed into the d20 Modern role-playing game. The Dark•Matter campaign is an entire d20 Modern expansion and Star*Drive is part of the d20 Future expansion. The Gamma World campaign is an d20 Modern expansion by Sword & Sorcery Studios (White Wolf).

=== Dice mechanics ===
Alternity uses four, six, eight, twelve, and twenty-sided dice.

The probability curve created by the addition or subtraction of a d20 and another die is shaped like a plateau, with two straight lines on both ends of the flat region. This is intermediate between the totally flat probability curve rolled by rolling a 20-sided die and the bell-shaped curve produced by die pool systems.

== Character classes ==
- Combat Specs: bodyguard, corporate security specialist, gunner, law enforcer, martial artist, alien combat spec, mercenary, soldier, and spacehand.
- Diplomats: ambassador, clergy, Concord administrator, corporate executive, entertainer, first contact consul, free trader, military officer, naval officer, stellar noble, and swindler.
- Free Agents: bounty hunter, corsair, explorer, gambler, guide/scout, investigator, outlaw, reporter, smuggler, spy, and thief.
- Tech Ops: crewman, comptech, gridpilot, doctor, engineer, independent pilot, medtech, scholar, and scientist.
- Mindwalkers: biokineticist, biowarrior, ESPion, mystic, telekineticist, psiguard, telepath, and mind knight.

== Published products ==
=== Core products ===
- Introductory Box Set
- Player's Handbook – Included all the rules for players and player characters. Required to play.
- Gamemaster Guide – Included all the rules for gamemasters and session preparation. Required to play.
- Fast Play – An abbreviated version of the rules to ease players into the game.
- Campaign Kit – Included a gamemaster's screen and a booklet of record-keeping forms.

=== Guides ===
- Beyond Science: A Guide to FX – An exploration and reworking of the FX abilities (superpowers or, essentially, magic) from the corebook.
- Dataware – Computers, hacking, and robotics.
- Mindwalking – Psionics, including revisions to the rules from the corebook.
- Starships – Interstellar ships and travel.
- Tangents – The concept of parallel realities in the same vein as the 1990s television show Sliders.

=== Campaign settings ===
- Star*Drive – A space opera setting.
- Dark•Matter – A present-day setting along the lines of The X-Files.
- Gamma World – An update to the classic post-apocalyptic game setting.
- StarCraft Adventures – An adaptation of the popular computer strategy game by Blizzard Entertainment. This setting used simplified "fast play" rules rather than the full Alternity rule set.

== Revival ==
A new game called Alternity was crowdfunded on Kickstarter in June 2017 by Sasquatch Game Studio and was successful and on August 1, 2018, the Core Rulebook was released to the public.
