= J. D. Wiker =

American game designer

JD Wiker
- Occupation: Game designer

J. D. Wiker is a game designer who has worked primarily on role-playing games.

== Early life ==
J. D. Wiker originally comes from Indianapolis, where he began his love of games, starting with his family's collection of board games and the weekly game night. He designed his first game — a mash-up of Stratego and Tank Battle — in 1977, and discovered Dungeons & Dragons while buying miniatures to use as playing pieces.

== Career ==
Wiker has done work on Wizards of the Coast's version of the Star Wars Roleplaying Game, including The Dark Side Sourcebook, The Hero's Guide, and The Galactic Campaign Guide. After leaving Wizards in 2002, he founded The Game Mechanics, and is the company's president and lead roleplaying game designer, with credits including Artifacts of the Ages: Swords & Staves and the City Quarters series: Thieves' Quarter, Temple Quarter, and Arcane Quarter.

His Dungeons & Dragons work has included design contributions to the third edition Player's Handbook, Monster Manual, and Dungeon Master's Guide (2000), Unearthed Arcana (2004), Planar Handbook (2004), Sandstorm (2005), and Monster Manual IV (2006).

In addition to his work in game design, Wiker is an experienced miniature painter, a hobby he developed alongside his interest in tabletop gaming. He has painted miniatures for many years and has also undertaken painting commissions. In an October 2024 interview, he discussed his painting techniques, advice for beginners and the challenges of producing commissioned work, highlighting miniature painting as an important part of his involvement in the tabletop gaming community.

== Personal life ==
Wiker lives and works in the San Diego area.
