= D20 System =

Role-playing game system

The d20 System is a role-playing game system published in 2000 by Wizards of the Coast, originally developed for the 3rd edition of Dungeons & Dragons. The system is named after a 20-sided die which is central to the core mechanics of many actions in the game.

Much of the d20 System was released as the System Reference Document (SRD) under the Open Game License (OGL) as Open Game Content (OGC), which allows commercial and non-commercial publishers to release modifications or supplements to the system without paying for the use of the system's associated intellectual property, which is owned by Wizards of the Coast.

The original impetus for the open licensing of the d20 System involved the economics of producing role-playing games (RPGs). Game supplements suffered significantly more diminished sales over time than the core books required to play the game. Ryan Dancey, brand manager for Dungeons & Dragons at the time, directed the effort of licensing the new edition of Dungeons & Dragons through the d20 System Trademark, allowing other companies to support the d20 System under a common brand identity. This is distinct from the Open Game License, which simply allows any party to produce works composed of or derivative of designated Open Game Content.

== Mechanics ==
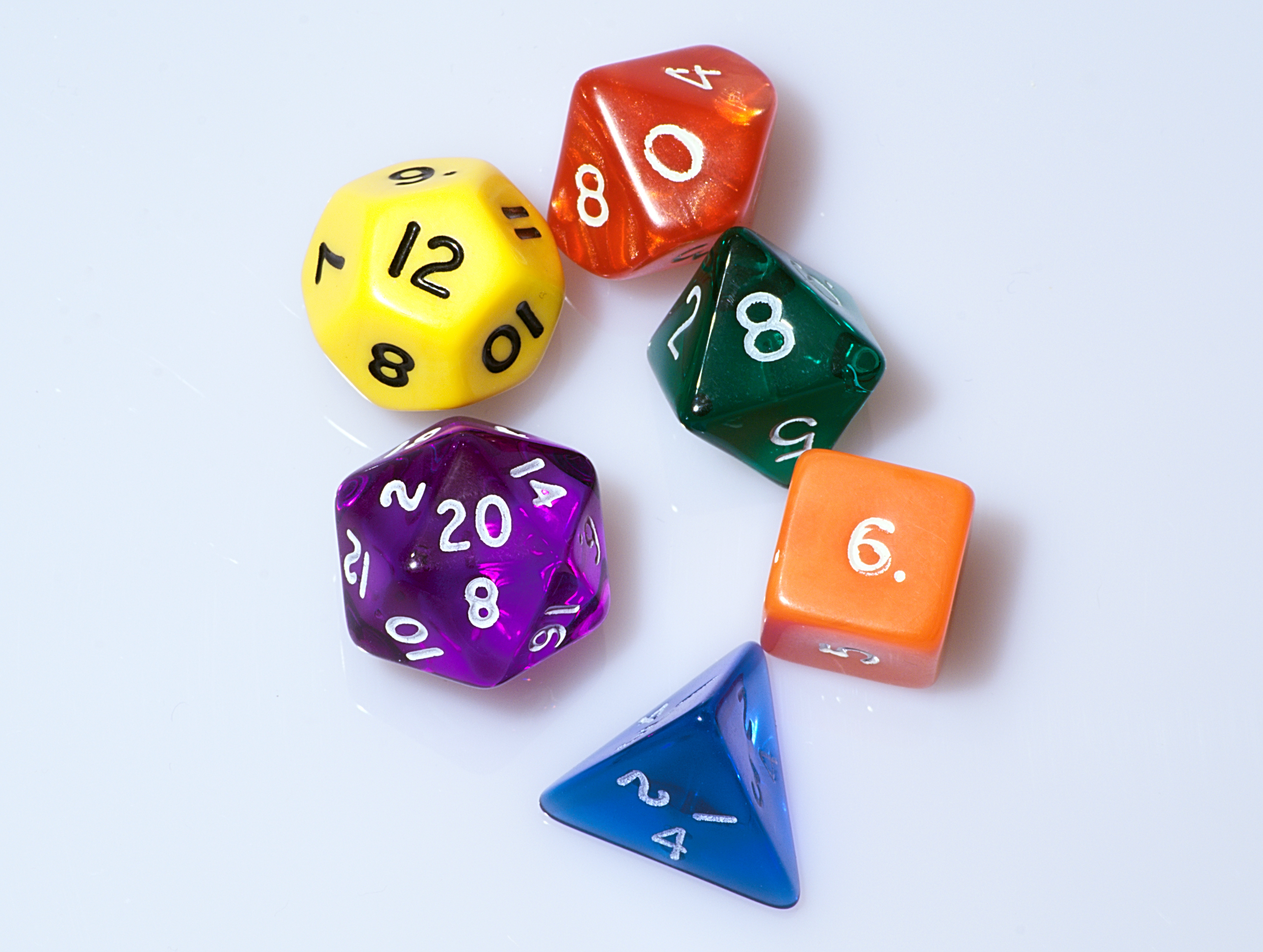
Dice used in the d20 system

The d20 System is a derivative of the third edition Dungeons & Dragons game system. The three primary designers behind the d20 System were Jonathan Tweet, Monte Cook, and Skip Williams; many others contributed, most notably Richard Baker and Wizards of the Coast then-president Peter Adkison. Many give Tweet the bulk of the credit for the basic resolution mechanic, citing similarities to the system behind his game Ars Magica. Tweet, however, stated that the other designers where already using a similar core mechanic when he joined the design team.

To resolve an action in the d20 System, a player rolls a 20-sided die and adds modifiers based on the natural aptitude of the character (defined by six attributes: Strength, Dexterity, Constitution, Intelligence, Wisdom, and Charisma) and how skilled the character is in various fields (such as in combat), as well as other, situational modifiers. If the result is greater than or equal to a target number (called a Difficulty Class or DC) then the action succeeds. This is called the Core Mechanic. This system is consistently used for all action resolution in the d20 System. In prior games in the D&D family, the rules for different actions, such as the first-edition hit tables or the second-edition Advanced Dungeons & Dragons (AD&D) "THAC0" and saving throw mechanics, varied considerably in which dice were used and even whether high numbers or low numbers were preferable.

The d20 System is not presented as a universal system in any of its publications or free distributions, unlike game systems like GURPS. Rather, the core system has been presented in a variety of formats that have been adapted by various publishers (both Wizards of the Coast and third-party) to specific settings and genres, much like the Basic Role-Playing system common to early games by veteran role-playing game publisher Chaosium.

The rules for the d20 System are defined in the System Reference Document or SRD (two separate SRDs were released, one for D&D 3rd edition and one for edition 3.5), which may be copied freely or even sold. Designed for fantasy-genre games in (usually) a pseudo-medieval setting, the SRD is drawn from the following D&D books: Player's Handbook v3.5, Expanded Psionics Handbook, Dungeon Master's Guide v3.5, Monster Manual v3.5, Deities and Demigods v3.0, Unearthed Arcana, and Epic Level Handbook. Information from these books not in the SRD include detailed descriptions, flavor text, and material Wizards of the Coast considers more specific product identity (such as references to the Greyhawk campaign setting and information on mind flayers).

d20 Modern has its own SRD, called the Modern System Reference Document (MSRD). The MSRD includes material from the d20 Modern Roleplaying Game, Urban Arcana Campaign Setting, d20 Menace Manual, and d20 Future. The MSRD can cover a wide variety of genres, but is intended for a modern-day, or in the case of the last of these, a futuristic setting.

== History ==
=== Development ===
Ryan Dancey believed that the strength of Dungeons & Dragons came from its gaming community instead of its game system, which supported his belief in an axiom that Skaff Elias promoted known as the "Skaff Effect" which posited that other role-playing game companies increased the success of the market leader, which at that time was Wizards of the Coast. Dancey also theorized that the proliferation of numerous game systems actually made the role-playing game industry weaker, and these beliefs together led Dancey to the idea to allow other publishers to create their own Dungeons & Dragons supplements. This led to a pair of licenses that Wizards of the Coast released in 2000, before 3rd edition Dungeons & Dragons was released: the Open Gaming License (OGL) made most of the game mechanics of 3rd edition D&D permanently open and available for use as what was known as system reference documents, while the d20 Trademark License allowed publishers to use the official "d20" mark of their products to show compatibility with those from Wizards of the Coast. Unlike the OGL, the d20 License was written so that Wizards could cancel it in the future.

=== 2000–2003: d20 boom ===
Initially there was a boom in the RPG industry caused by its use of the d20 license, with numerous companies publishing their own d20 supplements. Some companies used the d20 system to attempt to boost the sales of their proprietary systems, such as Atlas Games and Chaosium, while many other publishers produced d20 content exclusively, including existing companies such as Alderac Entertainment, Fantasy Flight Games, and White Wolf Publishing, as well as new companies like Goodman Games, Green Ronin, Mongoose Publishing, and Troll Lord Games. The success of the d20 license helped create an industry for PDF publishing for role-playing games to fill the demand for d20 products, where electronic delivery presented players with a very quick and inexpensive method to distribute content.

Wizards also began using their d20 system beyond just fantasy games, including their own Star Wars Roleplaying Game (2000) and the d20 Modern Roleplaying Game (2002). Wizards developed one of the settings from d20 Modern into the full Urban Arcana Campaign Setting (2003) sourcebook, and further extending the d20 into science-fiction with d20 Future (2004) and into historical settings with d20 Past (2005), then finished up their d20 line in 2006 with the classic Dark•Matter campaign setting. Third-party publishers used these d20 genre books to base their own campaign settings on, such as White Wolf using the d20 Modern rules to publish a licensed version of Gamma World (2006) and some supplements.

=== 2003 onward: 3.5 edition and d20 bust ===
In response to the sexually explicit Book of Erotic Fantasy (2003) announced by Valar Project for Dungeons & Dragons, Wizards of the Coast changed the d20 license so that publications were required to meet "community standards of decency", prompting Valar to simply remove direct references to Dungeons & Dragons and publish the book under the OGL. This event, by highlighting that Wizards of the Coast still held wide discretionary power over what counted as legitimate d20 material, made third-party game writers leery of publishing under the d20 license.

Wizards of the Coast released an updated version of Dungeons & Dragons, edition 3.5, at Gen Con 36 in August 2003. Third-party publishers were given little warning regarding the update and therefore many companies were stuck with books that were out-of-date before even reaching their audience. Wizards did not make any 3.5 update available for the d20 trademark. Between these two crises, many d20 publishers went out of business or left the field, but most that remained totally abandoned the d20 trademark in favor of publishing under the OGL. Publishers realized that they could publish d20 games successfully without depending upon the core books from Wizards of the Coast, and publishers even started to create OGL-based games that were direct competitors to D&D.

== Trademark license ==
Because Dungeons & Dragons is the most popular role-playing game in the world, many third-party publishers of the 2000s produced products designed to be compatible with that game and its cousin, d20 Modern. Wizards of the Coast provided a separate license allowing publishers to use some of its trademarked terms and a distinctive logo to help consumers identify these products. This was known as the d20 System Trademark License (d20STL).

The d20STL required publishers to exclude character-creation and advancement rules, apply certain notices, and adhere to an acceptable content policy. D20STL products were also required to clearly state that they require the core books from Wizards of the Coast for use. All d20STL products also had to use the OGL to make use of d20 System open content. However, products that only use the OGL are not bound by these restrictions; thus publishers were able to use the OGL without using the d20STL, and by including their own character-creation and advancement rules allow them to function as complete standalone games.

With the release of the 4th edition of Dungeons & Dragons in 2008, Wizards of the Coast revoked the original d20STL, replacing it with a new license specifically for D&D, known as the Game System License. The terms of this license are similar to the d20STL, but there is no associated OGL or Open Content, and the 4th-edition SRD merely lists the items and terms which may be used in licensed products. This did not affect the legal standing of the OGL, and products based on the SRD may still be released under the OGL alone.

== Controversy ==
When gaming company Valar Project attempted to publish the d20 Book of Erotic Fantasy (BoEF), which focused on sexual content, Wizards of the Coast altered the d20 System Trademark License in advance of publication of BoEF by adding a "quality standards" provision that required publishers to comply with "community standards of decency." This subsequently prevented the book's publication under the d20STL. Wizards of the Coast said this was done to protect its d20 System trademark. The Book of Erotic Fantasy was subsequently published without the d20 System trademark under the OGL. Other books subsequently published under similar circumstances include Skirmisher Publishing's Nuisances, which includes on its cover the disclaimer "Warning: intended for mature readers only."

The same round of changes to the license also limited the size at which the text "Requires the use of the Dungeons & Dragons Player's Handbook, Third Edition, published by Wizards of the Coast" (which is required to appear on the front or back cover of most fantasy d20 System products) could be printed, and prohibited making part of it larger than the rest.
