= List of Eberron novels =

Eberron novels

The following is a list of novels and anthologies set in the Dungeons & Dragons campaign setting of Eberron.

== The Dreaming Dark ==
- The City of Towers (Keith Baker, February 2005, ISBN 0-7869-3584-7)
- The Shattered Land (Keith Baker, February 2006, ISBN 0-7869-3821-8)
- The Gates of Night (Keith Baker, November 2006, ISBN 0-7869-4013-1)

== The Lost Mark ==
- Marked for Death (Matt Forbeck, March 2005, ISBN 978-0-7869-3610-6)
- Road to Death (Matt Forbeck, January 2006, ISBN 0-7869-3987-7)
- Queen of Death (Matt Forbeck, October 2006, ISBN 0-7869-4012-3)

== The War-Torn ==
- The Crimson Talisman (Adrian Cole, May 2005, ISBN 0-7869-3739-4)
- The Orb of Xoriat (Edward Bolme, October 2005, ISBN 0-7869-3819-6)
- In the Claws of the Tiger (James Wyatt, July 2006, ISBN 0-7869-4015-8)
- Blood and Honor (Graeme Davis, September 2006, ISBN 0-7869-4069-7)

== The Dragon Below ==
- The Binding Stone (Don Bassingthwaite, August 2005, ISBN 978-0-7869-3784-4)
- The Grieving Tree (Don Bassingthwaite, March 2006, ISBN 0-7869-3985-0)
- The Killing Song (Don Bassingthwaite, December 2006, ISBN 0-7869-4243-6)

== Blade of the Flame ==
- Thieves of Blood (Tim Waggoner, May 2006, ISBN 0-7869-4005-0)
- Forge of the Mindslayers (Tim Waggoner, March 2007, ISBN 0-7869-4313-0)
- Sea of Death (Tim Waggoner, February 2008, ISBN 978-0-7869-4791-1)

== Heirs of Ash ==
- Voyage of the Mourning Dawn (Rich Wulf, June 2006, ISBN 0-7869-4006-9)
- Flight of the Dying Sun (Rich Wulf, February 2007, ISBN 0-7869-4316-5)
- Rise of the Seventh Moon (Rich Wulf, October 2007, ISBN 0-7869-4342-4)

== The Inquisitives ==
Cover of the first edition of Legacy of Wolves

- Bound by Iron (Edward Bolme, April 2007, ISBN 978-0-7869-4264-0)
- Night of the Long Shadows (Paul Crilley, May 2007, ISBN 978-0-7869-4270-1)
- Legacy of Wolves (Marsheila Rockwell, June 2007, ISBN 978-0-7869-4293-0). Pat Ferrara of mania.com comments that the book "is a well-crafted story that, for all of its depth, feels like a miniscule [sic] slice out of a world that has a lot more is going on in it. Legacy of Wolves stands head and shoulders above the other installments in the Inquisitives series and makes you hope Wizards gives Marcy a bigger bite of Eberron to chew on in her next novels."
- The Darkwood Mask (Jeff LaSala, March 2008, ISBN 978-0-7869-4970-0)

== The Lanternlight Files ==
- The Left Hand of Death (Parker De Wolf, July 2007, ISBN 0-7869-4713-6)
- When Night Falls (Parker De Wolf, October 2008, ISBN 0-7869-4792-6)
- Death Comes Easy (Parker De Wolf, November 2010, ISBN 0-7869-4971-6, was never published)

== The Draconic Prophecies ==
- Storm Dragon (James Wyatt, Hardcover August 2007, ISBN 978-0-7869-4710-2, Paperback May 2008, ISBN 978-0-7869-4854-3)
- Dragon Forge (James Wyatt, Hardcover, June 2008, ISBN 0-7869-4870-1; Paperback, April 2009, ISBN 0-7869-5105-2)
- Dragon War (James Wyatt, Hardcover, August 2009, ISBN 0-7869-5122-2; Paperback, March 2010, ISBN 0-7869-5482-5)

== The Legacy of Dhakaan ==
- The Doom of Kings (Don Bassingthwaite, August 2008, ISBN 978-0-7869-4918-2)
- Word of Traitors (Don Bassingthwaite, September 2009, ISBN 0-7869-5196-6)
- The Tyranny of Ghosts (Don Bassingthwaite, June 2010, ISBN 0-7869-5506-6)

== Thorn of Breland ==
- The Queen of Stone (Keith Baker, November 2008, ISBN 0-7869-5009-9)
- Son of Khyber (Keith Baker, November 2009, ISBN 0-7869-5234-2)
- The Fading Dream (Keith Baker, October 2010, ISBN 0-7869-5624-0)

== The Abraxis Wren Chronicles ==
- Night of the Long Shadows (Paul Crilley, May 2007, ISBN 978-0-7869-4270-1)
- Taint of the Black Brigade (Paul Crilley, August 2010, ISBN 0-7869-5507-4)

== The Shard Axe ==
- The Shard Axe (Marsheila Rockwell, September 2011, ISBN 0-7869-5859-6) (Released as Dungeons & Dragons Online: Eberron Unlimited)
- Skein of Shadows (Marsheila Rockwell, July 2012, ISBN 978-0-7869-6139-9)

== Other formats ==
=== Standalone novels ===
- Lady Ruin (Tim Waggoner, December 2010, ISBN 0-7869-5625-9)

=== Anthologies ===
- Tales of the Last War (edited by Mark Sehestedt, April 2006, ISBN 0-7869-3986-9)
- Dragons: Worlds Afire (R.A. Salvatore, Margaret Weis & Tracy Hickman, Keith Baker, and Scott McGough, Hardcover: June 2006, ISBN 0-7869-4166-9; Oversized Paperback: July 2008, ISBN 0-7869-4976-7). Anthology containing one story each from the Eberron, Forgotten Realms, Dragonlance, and Magic: The Gathering settings.
- Untold Adventures (edited by Alan Dean Foster, Kevin J. Anderson, and Mike Resnick, July 2011, ISBN 0-7869-5837-5). Anthology containing stories from the Eberron, Forgotten Realms, Dark Sun, and Core settings.

=== Comics ===
- Eberron: Eye of the Wolf (Devil's Due Publishing, Writer: Keith Baker, Artist: Chris Lie and Rob Ruffolo, June 2006)
- Infestation 2: Dungeons & Dragons (IDW Publishing, Writer: Paul Crilley, Artist: Valerio Schiti, Livio Ramondelli and menton3, February 2012)
- Dungeons & Dragons: Eberron—Annual 2012 (IDW Publishing, Writer: Paul Crilley, Artist: Paco Diaz and menton3, April 2012)

These comics were then published together as a collected edition trade paperback:

- Dungeons & Dragons: Abraxis Wren of Eberron (IDW Publishing, June 2015, ISBN 978-1-63140-265-4)
