= Wizards Presents: Races and Classes =

Tabletop role-playing game supplement

- Genre: Role-playing games
- Publisher: Wizards of the Coast
- Publication date: December 2007

Wizards Presents: Races and Classes is an accessory released as a preview for the 4th edition of the Dungeons & Dragons fantasy role-playing game, published in December 2007.

== Contents ==
Wizards Presents: Races and Classes is a supplement which provided the first preview of the 4th edition of Dungeons & Dragons. Races and Classes was written by the designers of the new edition, and details both the concepts and decisions that went into creating the new edition and its game mechanics, art and ideas. The book went further into the design of the edition and also presented a timeline of the 4th edition design, reproduced excerpts from emails, and included anecdotes.

== Publication history ==
Wizards Presents: Races and Classes was published by Wizards of the Coast, with material compiled and edited by Michele Carter, featuring writing from Richard Baker, Logan Bonner, Bruce R. Cordell, Rob Heinsoo, Gwendolyn Kestrel, Mike Mearls, David Noonan, Stephen Radney-MacFarland, Stephen Schubert, Chris Sims, Matthew Sernett, Rodney Thompson, and James Wyatt with Bill Slavicsek, Stacy Longstreet, William O'Connor, Andy Collins, Christopher Perkins, and Daniel Reeve. The cover art was done by William O'Connor, and the book features illustrations from Eric Deschamps, Wayne England, David Griffith, Ralph Horsley, Todd Lockwood, Stacy Longstreet, Howard Lyon, Lee Moyer, William O'Connor, Steve Prescott, Daniel Reeve, and Arnie Swekel.

Shannon Appelcline commented that because Dungeons & Dragons Fourth Edition was published in the 21st century, more is known about that edition of the game than about almost any other roleplaying game, and "A lot of that is thanks to a pair of books published by Wizards, Wizards Presents: Races and Classes (2007) and Wizards Presents: Worlds and Monsters (2007). These discussions of 4e's design helped to build interest in the upcoming release and they also contributed to Wizard's final year of third-edition publication, when they were loathe [sic] to publish any actual game books. However, interviews, blogs, journals, tweets, forum posts and just about every other sort of high-tech information dispersal available to the modern world have supplemented those books."

== Reception ==
Wizards Presents: Races and Classes was reviewed by the online version of Pyramid on February 22, 2008. The reviewer declared that for some people, this book "will be the most important book of 2007" as the first preview of the forthcoming 4th edition. The reviewer identified some of its apparent sources of inspiration, which includes other Wizards of the Coast supplements, such as the recent Saga Edition of the Star Wars Roleplaying Game, Complete Arcane, Miniatures Handbook, and Tome of Battle.
