= Player's Guide to Faerûn =

2004 role-playing game supplement

- Genre: Role-playing game
- Publisher: Wizards of the Coast
- Publication date: March 2004
- Media type: Print
- ISBN: 0-7869-3134-5

Player's Guide to Faerûn is a supplement to the 3.5 edition of the Dungeons & Dragons role-playing game.

== Contents ==
Player's Guide to Faerûn is a collection of lore and arcana from the Forgotten Realms setting, to allow players to create and equip characters. The book includes races, feats, spells, prestige classes, and magic items for the 3.5 edition update to the setting, and includes material from 1st and 2nd edition.

== Publication history ==
Player's Guide to Faerûn was written by Richard Baker, Travis Stout, and James Wyatt, and published in March 2004. Cover art was by Adam Rex, with interior art by Thomas Baxa, Beet, Wayne England, Carl Frank, Randy Gallegos, Rafa Garres, Jeremy Jarvis, Raven Mimura, Scott Okumura, Jim Pavelec, Steve Prescott, Rick Sardinha, and Ben Thompson.

Rich Baker explained that the older material updated in this book included some materials from the 2nd Edition Forgotten Realms Adventures hardbound, Volo's Guide to All Things Magical, Hellgate Keep, Seven Sisters, and "other sources that hadn't been mined very deeply for Forgotten Realms 3.0".

== Reception ==
Viktor Coble listed Player's Guide To Faerûn as #1 on CBR's 2021 "D&D: 10 Best Supplemental Handbooks" list, stating that "It's full of unique classes, builds, items, encounters, and locations that only exist within Faerûn, including stats for popular Forgotten Realms characters found in best-selling novels."

== Reviews ==
- Backstab #48
- Backstab #51 (as "Manuel des Joueurs de Faerûn")
