= MYTHOLOG =

American web magazine

- Website type: Literary
- Available in: English
- Founded: 2002
- Dissolved: 2007
- Headquarters: United States
- Editor: Asher Black
- Industry: Online magazine
- Website: mytholog.com
- Launched: 2002
- Current status: Defunct

MYTHOLOG Literature of Mythic Proportions was a quarterly digital publication published from 2002 to 2007. It featured a collection of stories, poems, essays, reviews, writers, editors, illustrations and artists, that found myth in places odd and ordinary. The publication's Editor-in-Chief was Asher Black.

== Genre ==
MYTHOLOG accepted work on any genre, as long as they had some connection with mythic (not necessarily mythological) concepts.

It published essays such as The Door to the Imaginal Realm by Mary Pat Mann. later referenced in the book Alien Encounters by Patricia D. Netzley.

It was listed as a flash fiction market in Flash Fiction Flash Newsletter.

Genres included horror, such as The Cabin at the Top of the World by Mark Allan Gunnells, mentioned in the book 11 Classic Short Stories to Read by the Winter Fireplace.

It published erotic fiction as cited in the book Eternally Noir, 2005 from Logical-Lust Publications.

It also included religious poetry as mentioned in Joyce Lexicography Volume Fifteen, 2012 from Bucharest: Contemporary Literature Press. which is an imprint of The University of Bucharest, and has been cited in other academic publications such as 100 Papers: An Anthology of Flash Fiction and Prose Poetry with a Theoretical Postscript, University of the Witwatersrand, Johannesburg.

== Writers' market listings ==
MYTHOLOG was included in contemporary writers' market resources. The Speculative Literature Foundation listed it in its December 2004 newsletter and magazine directory as a quarterly electronic publication.

The magazine was also listed in Ralan's speculative-fiction market directory and Spicy Green Iguana.

Lesley Bown and Ann Gawthorpe included MYTHOLOG among electronic publications in Get Your Articles Published (McGraw-Hill, 2010).

== Notable authors ==
Contributors to MYTHOLOG included writers who also published novels, poetry collections, short-fiction collections and work in other literary magazines.

Bruce Holland Rogers, a recipient of the Nebula Award and Bram Stoker Award, contributed the story "Shaving" to MYTHOLOG, volume 3, number 4. His books include Bedtime Stories to Darken Your Dreams, Word Work: Surviving and Thriving as a Writer, and Flaming Arrows.

Marsheila Rockwell's poem "Fairy Tale Ending", published in MYTHOLOG, volume 3, number 3 (summer 2005), was nominated for the 2006 Rhysling Award. Rockwell also wrote Legacy of Wolves, a 2007 novel published by Wizards of the Coast for its Eberron setting.

Danny Adams contributed the poem "How To Be A Gracious Host To Your Alien Conqueror" to MYTHOLOG, volume 4, number 1. His poem "Utnapishtim on Friday After Dessert", published in Mythic Delirium, was nominated for the 2006 Rhysling Award. Adams also co-authored the 2007 science-fiction novella The City Beyond Play with Philip José Farmer.

Jacqueline West contributed the poem "Banshee" to MYTHOLOG, volume 3, number 3. Her poetry chapbook Cherma was published in 2010 by Parallel Press, associated with the University of Wisconsin–Madison. She later wrote the children's fantasy series The Books of Elsewhere.

Gerri Leen contributed several stories to MYTHOLOG, including "All for the Taste of a Pomegranate", "Selective Memory", and "The Weight of Things Forgotten". Her other work appeared in Sails & Sorcery: Nautical Tales of Fantasy and in volumes of Star Trek: Strange New Worlds.

Elizabeth Barrette contributed fourteen poems and the story "Beaver Goes to a Party" to MYTHOLOG. Her poem "The Poltergeist of Polaris", originally published in The Pedestal Magazine, was nominated for the 2005 Rhysling Award. Llewellyn's 2005 Magical Almanac identified her as managing editor of PanGaia and assistant editor of SageWoman; the same volume printed her articles "Salt of the Earth", "Through the Looking Glass: An Exploration of Mirrors", and "A Divine Marriage". She also authored Composing Magic: How to Create Magical Spells, Rituals, Blessings, Chants, and Prayers (2007), and her poem "Origami Emotion" appeared in The Impossible Will Take a Little While, edited by Paul Rogat Loeb.

Kristine Ong Muslim contributed "A Fourth Lesson in Magic" to MYTHOLOG, volume 4, number 4 (autumn 2006). Her subsequent books include The Drone Outside and Black Arcadia, both published in 2017.

Sarah Hilary contributed the flash-fiction story "Phosphorus" to MYTHOLOG, volume 5, number 3 (summer 2007). A contemporary contributor biography in Every Day Fiction also listed MYTHOLOG among her publication credits. Hilary later won the 2015 Theakston Crime Novel of the Year award for her debut crime novel Someone Else's Skin.

Lisa Agnew contributed the essay "Myths & Magic Portals" to MYTHOLOG, volume 3, number 4. Her first book, Sword: Tales from the Green Sahara, was published by Pen Press in 2002.

Elizabeth Thomas Wenning contributed the story "In a Name" to MYTHOLOG, volume 2, number 4. She also authored Confessions of a Mixed-Up Weasel Hater, published by Fame's Eternal Books in 2005.

Terry Dartnall's story "The Rundle" appeared in MYTHOLOG, volume 2, number 2 (spring 2004), and was subsequently included in his collection The Ladder at the Bottom of the World (Trantor Publications, 2006). Both a 2006 review in Tangent Online and a review by Alexandra Pierce originally published in 2007 discuss the story in that collection.

Brian Ames published "Feeding Time" and "The Hummock King" in MYTHOLOG, volumes 1, number 4 and 2, number 1, respectively. Both stories also appeared in his collection Head Full of Traffic (Pocol Press, 2004), as discussed in a review by Steve Duffy in All Hallows. His collection Eighty-Sixed: A Compendium of the Hapless was reviewed in Publishers Weekly in September 2004.

J. R. Cain contributed "The Choice" and "The Painter" to MYTHOLOG, volumes 1, number 2 (spring 2003) and 1, number 3 (summer 2003), respectively. He also edited issues of the speculative-fiction magazine Dark Animus.

Jerry J. Davis contributed the story "Island" to MYTHOLOG, volume 3, number 1. He is also the author of Travels and contributed "It Came from Willie McCracken's Buttocks" to the anthology Houston: We've Got Bubbas!, published by Yard Dog Press.

Stewart Sternberg contributed "God" to MYTHOLOG, volume 5, number 2. His story "The Others" appeared in High Seas Cthulhu (2007), an anthology of nautical Lovecraftian horror.

Robert Rhodes contributed "Chasing the Wind" to MYTHOLOG, volume 3, number 3. He collaborated with Howard Andrew Jones on a chapter about sword and sorcery for Books and Beyond: The Greenwood Encyclopedia of New American Reading.
