= Wizards Presents: Worlds and Monsters =

Tabletop role-playing game supplement

- Genre: Role-playing games
- Publisher: Wizards of the Coast
- Publication date: January 2008

Wizards Presents: Worlds and Monsters is an accessory released as a preview for the 4th edition of the Dungeons & Dragons fantasy role-playing game, published in January 2008. It is the second book in the series following Wizards Presents: Races and Classes.

== Contents ==
Wizards Presents: Worlds and Monsters is a behind-the-curtain glimpse into the making of the 4th edition of the Dungeons & Dragons roleplaying game. The book contains essays and asides from the game's designers, developers, and editors, and explores some of the D&D game's most iconic locations and monsters.

== Publication history ==
Wizards Presents: Worlds and Monsters was published by Wizards of the Coast, edited by Jennifer Clarke Wilkes, and written by Richard Baker, Logan Bonner, Andy Collins, Bruce R. Cordell, Rob Heinsoo, David Noonan, Christopher Perkins, Matthew Sernett, Chris Sims, and James Wyatt.

Shannon Appelcline commented that because the fourth edition of Dungeons & Dragons was published in the 21st century, more information is known about that edition of the game than nearly any other roleplaying game, and "A lot of that is thanks to a pair of books published by Wizards, Wizards Presents: Races and Classes (2007) and Wizards Presents: Worlds and Monsters (2007). These discussions of 4e's design helped to build interest in the upcoming release and they also contributed to Wizard's final year of third-edition publication, when they were loathe [sic] to publish any actual game books. However, interviews, blogs, journals, tweets, forum posts and just about every other sort of high-tech information dispersal available to the modern world have supplemented those books."
