= Lost Empires of Faerûn =

Dungeons & Dragons rulebook

- Genre: Role-playing game
- Published: 2005 (Wizards of the Coast)
- Media type: Print
- Pages: 192

Lost Empires of Faerûn is a campaign supplement for the fictional Forgotten Realms campaign setting for the 3.5 edition of the Dungeons & Dragons fantasy role-playing game.

== Contents ==
This 192-page hardcover book begins with a two-page introduction explaining that this book covers the various ruined kingdoms of the ancient world of Faerûn, in other words the Lost Empires of Faerûn. Chapter 1: Ancient Secrets, on pages 6–35, details prestige classes, feats, and spells common for characters that keep alive the ancient secrets and traditions of the past. Chapter 2: Dreams of the Past, on pages 36–50, examines how the ancient past plays a role in the modern Realms. Chapter 3: The Crown Wars, on pages 51–59, described the elven realms of the Crown Wars, which were waged upon each other and resulted in the descent of the drow and the establishment of Evereska and Evermeet. Chapter 4: God-Kings of the East, on pages 60–82, details the Old Empires of Mulhorand and Unther, and rival empires Narfell and Raumathar. Chapter 5: Realms of the High Forest, on pages 83–94, describes the kingdoms of Eaerlann, Siluvanede, Sharrven, and the surrounding states. Chapter 6: Fallen Netheril, on pages 95–112, describes Netheril, the most famous of Faerûn's fallen states, which now lies buried under Anauroch. Chapter 7: The Imperial South, on pages 113–124, examines Coramshan and Jhaamdath. Chapter 8: The Dream of Cormanthyr, on pages 125–135, described the fabled realm of Myth Drannor. Chapter 9: The Old North, on pages 136–150, details the history of the Sword Coast North. Chapter 10: Artifacts of the Past, on pages 151–159, introduces magic items created and used by people of the various lost empires. Chapter 11: Monsters of the Ancient Lands, on pages 160–192, presents twenty-nine monsters that originated in these long-lost lands, including the crawling claw, the deepspawn, the flameskull, the helmed horror, the phaerimm, and the tressym.

== Publication history ==
The book was published in 2005, and was written by Richard Baker, Ed Bonny, and Travis Stout, with cover art by Mark Sasso. Interior art is by Thomas M. Baxa, Matt Cavotta, Brian Despain, Marko Djordjevic, Jason Engle, Earl Frank, Randy Gallegos, Rafa Garres, Chris Hawkes, Ralph Horsley, Jeremy Jarvis, Dana Knutson, Vince Locke, Raven Mimura, William O'Connor, Jim Pavelec, Steve Prescott, Wayne Reynolds, Richard Sardinha, and Francis Tsai.

== Reception ==
In a review of Lost Empires of Faerûn in Black Gate, John ONeill said "Lost Empires is a sourcebook exploring the ruins and secrets of the fallen empires of the Forgotten Realms campaign setting. Admit it — any time 'sourcebook' and 'ruins' go together, you know you're going to get good some use of it."

In a review for RPGnet, Matt Drake says that Lost Empires of Faerûn gives a complete history of Faerûn, as well as enough information to run adventures in the lost empires described.

== Reviews ==
- Backstab #51
