= Theatrix Ironwood =

Tabletop role-playing game supplement

Cover art by Bill Willingham, 1994

Theatrix Ironwood is a 1994 supplement published by Backstage Press for the diceless role-playing game Theatrix.

== Description ==
The book details Avalon, a European-feudal land of magic, and how it can be used to create a Theatrix campaign world. As well as outlining the many races that can be used for character classes, the book also includes a bestiary of the numerous monsters found there.

== Publication history ==
In 1993, Backstage Press published the rules for Theatrix, a role-playing game that was unusual at the time for using storytelling instead of dice to determine successes or failures during the role-playing adventure.

The following year, Backstage published Ironwood, the first setting for the Theatrix rules. The 288-page softcover book, designed by David Berkman, Travis Eneix, Andrew Finch, and Anthony J. Gallela, was based on the erotic/pornographic comic series Ironwood written and drawn by Bill Willingham, who provided all the illustrations and cover art for this book, some of which included nudity.

When Backstage tried to sell the book at Gen Con that year, they were banned from the convention due to the adult nature of Ironwood's content.

In the 2014 book Designers & Dragons, game historian Shannon Appelcline explained why TSR, who owned Gen Con at that time, did this: "In the early '90s, TSR was running scared from angry mothers who thought that D&D was evil. Demons and devils disappeared from AD&D and guidelines for what could be shown at Gen Con grew stringent, surpassing the early years when there was no code of product standards. This was the atmosphere when Theatrix Presents Ironwood (1994) got banned from the convention." Appelcline also noted that "Backstage Press co-founder Andrew Finch made a lot of hay on the internet about the banning."

== Reception ==
Despite TSR's Gen Con ban, reviewer Rick Swan, writing in the TSR-published magazine Dragon, liked Ironwood, calling the setting of Avalon "one part monster, one part Monty Python." He found that "the whimsical magical items are especially fun."

In Issue 13 of Arcane, Andy Butcher called it "one of those jokey, eclectic fantasy settings where vampires bump into centaurs and giant snails; where your deity might drop in for supper and second year demonologists get lectures from genuine demons." Despite "an impressive amount of information", Butcher found the writing style to be "cryptic and occasionally impenetrable." He concluded by giving the game a below-average rating of 6 out of 10, saying, "There is very little about how to run an Avalon-based campaign, and about what sort of adventures are appropriate for the setting."
