= Cormyr: The Tearing of the Weave =

Dungeons & Dragons adventure

- Rules required: Dungeons & Dragons, 3.5 edition
- Character levels: 4th-7th
- Authors: Richard Baker, Bruce R. Cordell, David Noonan, Matthew Sernett, and James Wyatt
- First published: March 2007

Cormyr: The Tearing of the Weave is an adventure module for the 3.5 edition of the Dungeons & Dragons fantasy role-playing game.

== Plot summary ==
Cormyr: The Tearing of the Weave takes place in the Forgotten Realms setting, where a sinister conspiracy beyond the pristine facade of the Temple of Mystra threatens the future of Cormyr, as profane acts within the temple hearken to a mounting threat in the Vast Swamp. The player characters must cross into the Plane of Shadow to unlock the truth about this growing darkness in time to thwart an attack against Cormyr and Mystra herself.

== Publication history ==
Cormyr: The Tearing of the Weave was published in March 2007, and was written by Richard Baker, Bruce R. Cordell, David Noonan, Matthew Sernett, and James Wyatt, with cover art by William O'Connor and interior art by William O'Connor, Jim Pavelec and Chris Dien.

== Reception ==
In a review of Cormyr: The Tearing of the Weave in Black Gate, John ONeill said "I was quite taken with the finished product and I'm very much looking forward to following the adventure thread into Shadowdale."
