= Monster Manual III =

2004 Dungeons & Dragons manual

- Authors: Rich Burlew, Eric Cagle, Jesse Decker, Andrew J. Finch, Gwendolyn F.M. Kestrel, Rich Redman, Matthew Sernett, Chris Thomasson, and P. Nathan Toomey
- Genre: Role-playing game
- Publisher: Wizards of the Coast
- Publication date: September 2004
- Media type: Print (Hardback)

Monster Manual III is a rulebook published in September 2004 by Wizards of the Coast, for use with the Dungeons & Dragons role-playing game. It is the first of the monster specific books published by Wizards of the Coast to be made for the 3.5 edition of the game. It cites sources from Dragon magazine, Manual of the Planes, the Planes of Law Campaign Expansion, and the first edition of Fiend Folio.

The book is notable for being published for use with the two main endorsed campaign settings of Forgotten Realms and Eberron with many creatures containing sections explaining where they might be found in the campaign setting.

== Contents ==
The book contained more monsters and was originally published in the v3.5 format. It is notable for its descriptions of where the monsters might be found in the Eberron and Forgotten Realms campaign settings. Chris Perkins explained: "Almost all of the monsters in the Monster Manual III are new. We didn't want to give gamers a bunch of beasties they'd already seen, and we found several interesting monster niches to fill. That said, we felt it was important to update some of the yugoloths (canoloth, mezzoloth, nycaloth, and ultraloth) to v.3.5, and we also updated the 1st edition flind, kenku, and susurrus. We also grabbed a handful of monsters from Dragon Magazine."

== Publication history ==
Monster Manual III was published in 2004, and was designed by Rich Burlew, Eric Cagle, Jesse Decker, Andrew J. Finch, Gwendolyn F.M. Kestrel, Rich Redman, Matthew Sernett, Chris Thomasson, and P. Nathan Toomey. Cover art was by Henry Higgenbotham, with interior art by Dave Allsop, David Bircham, Matt Cavotta, Wayne England, Emily Fiegenschuh, Rafa Garres, Ralph Horsley, Frazer Irving, Rom Lemen, Howard Lyon, Leslie Minnis, Dean Ormston, Lucio Parrillo, Steve Prescott, Vinod Rams, Adam Rex, Wayne Reynolds, Anne Stokes, Mark Tedin, Francis Tsai, Franz Vohwinkel, Anthony Waters, Jonathan Wayshak, Sam Wood, and James Zhang.

== Reception ==
The reviewer from Pyramid commented: "The Monster Manual III suffers from exactly the same problems that any added-on creature collection always suffer from. Many of the monsters are derivative or simply variations on pre-existing creatures. Additionally, there is the problem of springing these monsters into campaigns that have existed for months or years without them. Many creatures have a back story already added for them, allowing for as seamless of an addition to an ongoing campaign as possible, and virtually every creature lists where it frequently occurs in the Wizard's campaign settings of Faerun and Eberron, nice additions for players in those worlds. As is normal with Wizards of the Coast books, the art is routinely excellent, and the pages are well laid out and easy to follow."
