= David Wagoner =

American poet and novelist (1926–2021)

- Born: David Russell Wagoner; June 5, 1926; Massillon, Ohio, U.S.
- Died: December 18, 2021 (aged 95); Edmonds, Washington, U.S.
- Occupations: Poet; novelist; professor
- Spouse: Robin Seyfried
- Children: 2
- Writing career
- Notable awards: Pushcart Prize; Ruth Lilly Poetry Prize

David Russell Wagoner (June 5, 1926 – December 18, 2021) was an American poet, novelist, and educator.

== Biography ==
David Russell Wagoner was born on June 5, 1926, in Massillon, Ohio. Raised in Whiting, Indiana, from the age of seven, Wagoner attended Pennsylvania State University where he was a member of Naval Reserve Officers Training Corps and graduated in three years. He received a Master of Arts in English from the Indiana University Bloomington in 1949 and had a long association with the University of Washington where he taught, beginning in 1954, on the suggestion of friend and fellow poet Theodore Roethke.

Wagoner was editor of Poetry Northwest from 1966 to 2002. He was elected chancellor of the Academy of American Poets in 1978 and served in that capacity until 1999. One of his novels, The Escape Artist, was turned into a film by executive producer Francis Ford Coppola.

Wagoner was professor emeritus at the University of Washington, but after his retirement from full-time university teaching, Wagoner continued to lecture and teach in various workshop and low-residency writing programs, including the Hugo House and the MFA program of the Northwest Institute of Literary Arts on Whidbey Island.

== Poetry and recognition ==
The natural environment of the Pacific Northwest was the subject of much of David Wagoner's poetry. He cited his move from the Midwest as a defining moment: "[W]hen I came over the Cascades and down into the coastal rainforest for the first time in the fall of 1954, it was a big event for me, it was a real crossing of a threshold, a real change of consciousness. Nothing was ever the same again."

David Wagoner's Collected Poems was nominated for the National Book Award in 1977 and he won the Pushcart Prize that same year. He was again nominated for a National Book Award in 1979 for In Broken Country. He won his second Pushcart Prize in 1983. He is the recipient of the American Academy of Arts and Letters award, the Sherwood Anderson Foundation Fiction Award, the Ruth Lilly Poetry Prize (1991), the English-Speaking Union prize from Poetry magazine, and the Arthur Rense Prize in 2011. He has also received fellowships from the Ford Foundation, the Guggenheim Foundation, and the National Endowment for the Arts.

== Death ==
Wagoner died in his sleep at a nursing home in Edmonds, Washington, on December 18, 2021, at the age of 95. He was survived by his wife, Robin Seyfried, and their two daughters.

== Bibliography ==
=== Poetry collections ===
- Dry Sun, Dry Wind (1953)
- A Place to Stand (1958)
- Poems (1959)
- The Nesting Ground (1963)
- Staying Alive (1966)
- New and Selected Poems (1969)
- Working Against Time (1970)
- Riverbed (1972)
- Sleeping in the Woods (1974)
- A Guide to Dungeness Spit (1975)
- Collected Poems, 1956–1976
- Who Shall Be the Sun? (1978)
- In Broken Country (1979)
- One for the Rose (1981)
- Landfall (1981)
- My Physics Teacher (1981)
- First Light (1983)
- Through the Forest (1987)
- Walt Whitman Bathing (1996)
- Traveling Light (1999)
- The House of Song (2002)
- Good Morning and Good Night (2005)
- A Map of the Night (2008)
- After the Point of No Return (Copper Canyon Press, 2012)

=== Novels ===
- ''The Man in the Middle (1954)
- Money, Money, Money (1955)
- Rock (1958)
- The Escape Artist (1965)
- Baby, Come On Inside (1968)
- Where is My Wandering Boy Tonight? (1970)
- The Road to Many a Wonder (1974)
- Tracker (1975)
- Whole Hog (1976)
- The Hanging Garden (1980)

=== Edited volumes ===
- Straw for the Fire: From the Notebooks of Theodore Roethke (1972) (selected and arranged by David Wagoner)
- The Best American Poetry 2009

=== Theatre ===
- An Eye For An Eye For An Eye (produced in 1973)
- First Class: A Play About Theodore Roethke (2007).
