= Bruce Holland Rogers =

American novelist

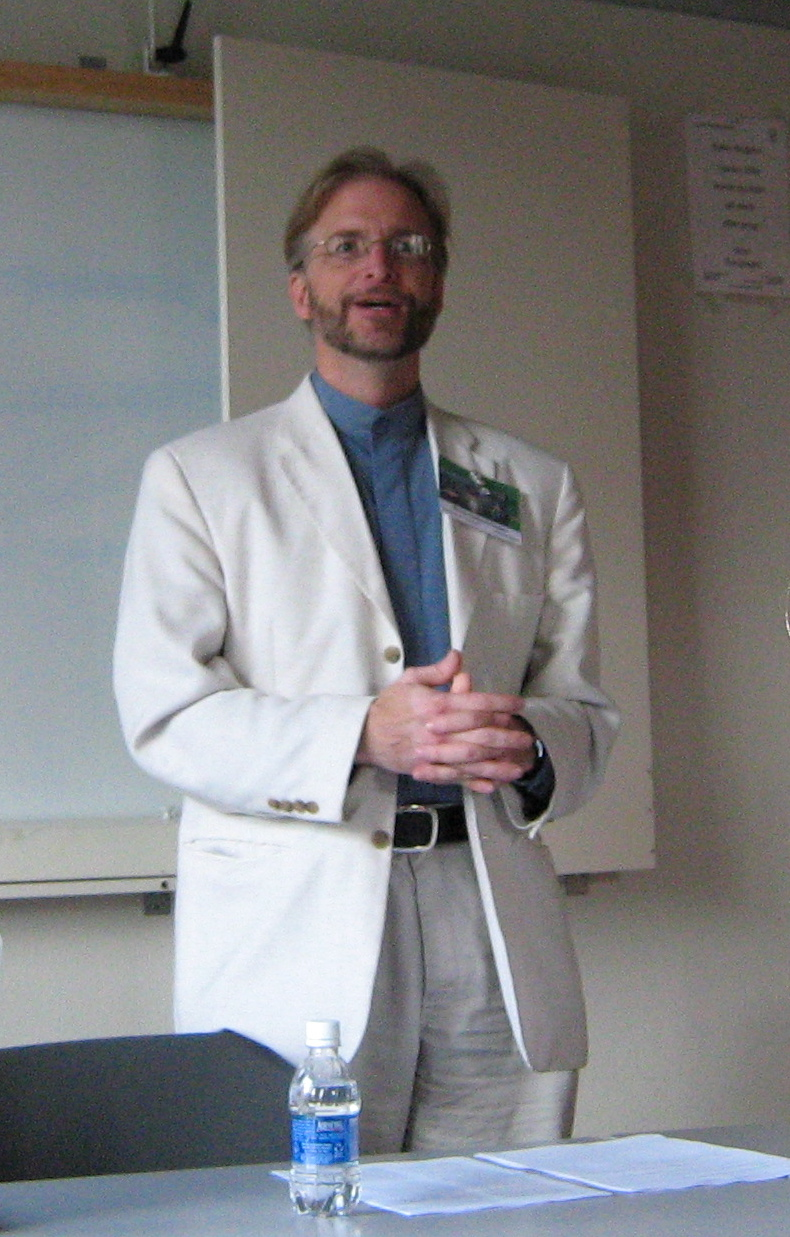
B.H. Rogers giving a talk at Eurocon 2007 in Copenhagen.

Bruce Holland Rogers is an American author of short fiction who also writes under the pseudonym Hanovi Braddock. He writes in several genres including science fiction, fantasy, mysteries, and experimental. His stories have won a Pushcart Prize, two Nebula Awards, the Bram Stoker Award, two World Fantasy Awards, the Micro Award, and have been nominated for the Edgar Allan Poe Award and Spain's Premio Ignotus.

The 2001 short film The Other Side, directed by Mary Stuart Masterson, was based on his novelette, "Lifeboat on a Burning Sea".

He is a member of the Wordos writers' group and was a founding member of the fiction faculty at the MFA program in creative writing of the Northwest Institute of Literary Arts. He has taught fiction writing seminars in Denmark, Greece, Finland, and Portugal. In 2010 he taught at Eötvös Loránd University in Budapest on a Fulbright grant.

== Awards ==
- 1997: Nebula Award for Best Novelette for "Lifeboat on a Burning Sea"
- 1999: Nebula Award for Best Short Story for "Thirteen Ways to Water"
- 1998: Bram Stoker Award for short fiction for "The Dead Boy at Your Window"
- 1999: Pushcart Prize for "The Dead Boy at Your Window"
- 1999: Oregon Arts Commission Individual Artist Fellowship
- 2004: World Fantasy Award for Short Fiction for "Don Ysidro"
- 2006: World Fantasy Award for Collection for The Keyhole Opera
- 2008: Micro Award for "Reconstruction Work"
- 2012: Micro Award for "Divestiture"

== Bibliography ==
=== Novels ===
- Mind Games (as Victor Appleton) (1992)
- Ashes of the Sun (as Hanovi Braddock) (1996)

=== Collections ===
- Tales and Declarations (poetry chapbook) (1991)
- Wind Over Heaven and Other Dark Tales (1997)
- Flaming Arrows (2000)
- Lifeboat on a Burning Sea: And Other Stories (2001)
- Bruce Holland Rogers: Short Stories, Volume 1 (2003)
- Thirteen Ways to Water and Other Stories (2004)
- The Keyhole Opera (2005)
- "String Theory" in Riffing on Strings: Creative Writing Inspired by String Theory (contributor) (2008)

=== Non-fiction ===
- Word Work: Surviving and Thriving as a Writer (2002)

=== Flash fiction ===
- Shaving. MYTHOLOG, 3(4) (2005)

== See also ==
- Flash fiction
