= The Yellow Silk =

2004 novel by Don Bassingthwaite

- Paperback edition cover
- Author: Don Bassingthwaite
- Cover artist: Mark Zug
- Language: English
- Series: The Rogues
- Genre: Fantasy novel
- Publisher: Wizards of the Coast
- Publication date: February 2004
- Publication place: United States
- Media type: Print (Paperback)
- Pages: 320 (Paperback edition)
- ISBN: 0-7869-3152-3
- OCLC: 54342824
- LC Class: CPB Box no. 2280 vol. 16
- Preceded by: The Crimson Gold

The Yellow Silk (ISBN 0-7869-3152-3) is a fantasy novel written by Don Bassingthwaite in 2004. It is the last book in The Rogues, a series of stand-alone novels set in the Forgotten Realms fictional universe.

== Plot introduction ==
The novel follows the adventures of Kuang Li Chien, an easterner from the country of Shou Lung, and Tychoben Arisaenn, a minor bard who lives in the seedy port town of Spandeliyon, Altumbel. Li Chien arrives in Spandeliyon on an important family mission to find his eldest brother, Yu Mao, who disappeared when the Shou trading expedition he headed was attacked by the Sow, a notorious pirate ship. His only lead is the pirate ship's first mate, a cruel halfling by the name of Brin, who has retired in Spandeliyon. Seeking information about his whereabouts at a dockside tavern called the Wench's Ease, Li Chien meets Tycho, who is playing that night. The two clash immediately, but despite their differences, Tycho tries to warn Li Chien against inquiring too insistently about Brin. Ignoring his warnings, Li Chien leaves the tavern with a local man named Lander, who claims he can help him find the ex-pirate...

== Publication history ==
- 2004, USA, Wizards of the Coast ISBN 0-7869-3152-3, Pub date 3 February 2004, Paperback.

== Reception ==
One reviewer stated: "The Yellow Silk is an engaging fantasy, with overtones of reality in terms of the perceived ethnographic backgrounds of the protagonists." Another reviewer stated: "This was an enjoyable one shot story that wrapped up just fine and was worth the time I spent on it."
