= Cormyr =

Cormyr may refer to:

- Cormyr (fictional country), fictional country in the Dungeons & Dragons world of Forgotten Realms
  - Cormyr: A Novel, 1996 fantasy novel by Ed Greenwood and Jeff Grubb
  - Murder in Cormyr, 1996 fantasy novel by Chet Williamson
  - Cormyr: The Tearing of the Weave, adventure module for the 3.5 edition of Dungeons & Dragons

== See also ==
- Neverwinter Nights: Wyvern Crown of Cormyr
