= Deborah Teramis Christian =

American author and game designer

Deborah Teramis Christian is an American author and game designer. She previously worked under the name Deborah Christian, but now prefers to be called by her middle name and uses her full name on book credits. Teramis has used the pen-name Terry Randall on some of her RPG works. She is a US Army veteran.

== Career ==
Christian has designed and edited role-playing game materials for Dungeons & Dragons, including Tales of the Outer Planes, The Minrothad Guilds, Lords of Darkness, Bestiary of Dragons and Giants, Adventure Pack I, Dragon Dawn, and Kara-Tur: The Eastern Realms.

== Novels ==
- Mainline (1996)
- Kar Kilam (1998)
- The Truthsayer's Apprentice (1999)
- Splintegrate (2014)

== Sources ==
- "Deborah Christian : Pen & Paper RPG Database". Archived from the original on March 11, 2005.
