= As One Dead =

1996 novel by Don Bassingthwaite and Nancy Kilpatrick

As One Dead is a 1996 novel written by Don Bassingthwaite and Nancy Kilpatrick.

== Plot summary ==
As One Dead is a novel in which the complex factions and rivalries of vampires involve a brutal power struggle between two major vampiric sects in Toronto: the savage, dominant Sabbat and the embattled Camarilla. Bianka, a determined leader of the Camarilla, challenges Lot, a formidable Sabbat figure, in a conflict that evokes themes of rebellion, ideology, and personal sacrifice. Against the backdrop of clan-based intrigue and metaphysical darkness, their clash unfolds.

== Reception ==
Andy Butcher reviewed As One Dead for Arcane magazine, rating it a 7 out of 10 overall, and stated that "There's virtually no point in reading As One Dead unless you're familiar with Vampire: The Masquerade - the book tends to assume that the reader understands the basics of the background. For players and referees of the game, however, it does have some merit, and makes for an enjoyable read."

Reviewer Neil Barton commented that it and other vampire novels he reviewed "were competently told, but all spotlighted a shortcoming of this type of tale: the absence of any significant human presence from these stories robs the vampire characters of their power to horrify."
