= Unapproachable East =

Role-playing game supplement

- Unapproachable East book cover
- Author: Richard Baker, Matt Forbeck, and Sean K. Reynolds
- Genre: Role-playing games
- Publisher: Wizards of the Coast
- Publication date: May 2003
- Media type: Hardcover

Unapproachable East is a hardcover accessory for the 3rd edition of the Dungeons & Dragons fantasy role-playing game.

== Contents ==
Unapproachable East describes locations such as Aglarond, Rashemen, and Thay for the Forgotten Realms setting.

== Publication history ==
Unapproachable East was published in May 2003, and was designed by Richard Baker, Matt Forbeck, and Sean K. Reynolds. Cover art is by Matt Wilson, with interior art by Glen Angus, Matt Cavotta, Mike Dutton, Wayne England, Matt Faulkner, Vince Locke, Raven Mimura, Jim Pavelec, Steve Prescott, Adam Rex, Matt Wilson, and Sam Wood.

Matt Forbeck explained the creative process for the book: "As the developer, Rich came up with an outline for the book, lined up the writers, and then parceled out the work. As I recall, Sean turned in his chapter on Rashemen first, which was a great model for me to follow. I wrote a big chunk of the book after that. Then Rich took what we'd turned in, added a ton of his own material, and polished the whole thing to a mirror finish."

== Reviews ==
- Black Gate #6
- Backstab #49
