= Underdark (supplement) =

2003 role-playing game supplement

- Cover of Underdark
- Author: Bruce R. Cordell, Gwendolyn F. M. Kestrel, Jeff Quick
- Genre: Role-playing game
- Publisher: Wizards of the Coast
- Publication date: 2003
- Media type: Print (Hardcover)

The Underdark sourcebook for the Forgotten Realms campaign setting of the 3.5 edition of the Dungeons & Dragons role-playing game.

== Contents ==
The sourcebook covers gaming material such as new character classes, Drow Judicator as well as covering the geography of this fictional setting.

== Publication history ==
This book was written by Bruce R. Cordell, Gwendolyn F.M. Kestrel, and Jeff Quick, and was released in October 2003 published by Wizards of the Coast. Cover art was by Sam Wood, with interior art by Kalman Andrasofszky, Matt Cavotta, Mike Dubisch, Wayne England, Matt Faulkner, Vance Kovacs, Vince Locke, Raven Mimura, Jim Pavelec, Vinod Rams, Richard Sardinha, Stephen Tappin, and Joel Thomas.

When asked how the designers dealt sorting through years' worth of publications on the Underdark to create a more definitive sourcebook, Jeff Quick responded: "I was the editor of Eric Boyd's exhaustively detailed 2nd edition sourcebook, Drizzt Do'Urden's Guide to the Underdark. Eric, as Forgotten Realms fans know, is a detail nut. When he wrote it, he consulted pretty much every Underdark reference ever -- including Bob Salvatore, personally. So rather than duplicate effort, I turned to that book for inspiration and to Eric for a few details and opinions."

== Reception ==
In a review of Underdark in Black Gate, John ONeill said "Forgotten Realms: Underdark is one of the most readable and entertaining gaming supplements I've read in years and it's well worth the few measly bucks sellers are charging for it these days. If you think your underworld design has recently gotten stale, or if you just want to remind yourself of the magic of Gary Gygax's original D-series adventures, then this book is what you're looking for."

The editor from rpgnews.com stated the book did not deliver on the price it costs, was incomplete, contained a lot of assumed information making it difficult for casual readers to understand references without knowledge of the novels; however, fans of the novels might enjoy it.

Viktor Coble listed Underdark as #5 on CBR's 2021 "D&D: 10 Best Supplemental Handbooks" list, stating that ""Underdark" reveals a massive breadth to the area, filling it to the brim with disastrous creatures of the dark. It stacks this whole world and way of thinking underneath what normally happens, making great strides in building up alternate ways of adventuring and the dangers involved in stepping out of a player's comfort zone."
