= The Killing Song =

2006 novel by Don Bassingthwaite

- Cover of the first edition
- Language: English
- Genre: Fantasy novel
- Published: 2006
- Publication place: United States
- Media type: Print (Paperback)
- ISBN: 0-7869-4243-6

The Killing Song is a fantasy novel by Don Bassingthwaite, set in the world of Eberron, and based on the Dungeons & Dragons role-playing game. It is the third novel in "The Dragon Below" series. It was published in paperback in December 2006.

== Plot summary ==
The adventurers from The Grieving Tree prepare for war against the dragon Dah'mir.

== Reception ==
Pat Ferrara of mania.com comments: "The final installment of The Dragon Below Trilogy is just as much fun as the rest of the novels. [...] Don proves he can handle two separate plotlines at the same time while smoothly integrating them into the whole story. This worked well in the novel but also limited the potential of character interactions (I love Geth and Singe's unstable friendship). I also felt the ending to this book was a little rushed. Maybe it's just because I enjoyed this series so much but it seemed like all of a sudden the gang was split up and moving in their own separate directions, which made me sad."
