= Ed Stark =

American role-playing game designer

- Occupation: Game designer

Ed Stark is a game designer who has worked primarily on role-playing games.

== Career ==
Ed Stark began his career at West End Games, where he wrote for the TORG and Star Wars lines. He was the main developer behind the MasterBook system and the so-called "Fifth edition" of Paranoia.

After being hired by Wizards of the Coast, Stark was part of the SCRAMJET team, led by Richard Baker, with designers James Wyatt, Matthew Sernett, Michele Carter, Stacy Longstreet, and Chris Perkins; this team was responsible for updating the fictional setting as it would be used for the fourth edition of Dungeons & Dragons which was in development.

His D&D design work includes Legends of the Hero-Kings (1996), Children of the Night: Ghosts (1997), Children of the Night: The Created (1999), Complete Warrior (2003), Fiendish Codex I: Hordes of the Abyss (2006), Fantastic Locations: Dragondown Grotto (2006), Barrow of the Forgotten King (2007), Fantastic Locations: City of Peril (2007), and Complete Champion (2007).

He also wrote the novel City of Fire under the shared pseudonym T.H. Lain.
