= Michele Carter =

Role-playing game designer

- Occupation: Game designer

Michele Carter is a game designer who has worked primarily on role-playing games.

== Career ==
Michele Carter was part of the SCRAMJET team, led by Richard Baker, with designers James Wyatt, Matthew Sernett, Ed Stark, Stacy Longstreet, and Chris Perkins; this team was responsible for updating the fictional setting as it would be used for the fourth edition of Dungeons & Dragons which was in development. Carter compiled and edited the content for the D&D fourth edition preview book, Wizards Presents: Races and Classes (2007).
