= Forsaken House (novel) =

2004 novel by Richard Baker

- Cover of the first edition
- Author: Richard Baker
- Cover artist: Adam Rex
- Language: English
- Series: The Last Mythal
- Genre: Fantasy novel
- Publisher: Wizards of the Coast
- Publication date: August 2004
- Publication place: United States
- Media type: Print (Paperback)
- Pages: 338 (Paperback edition)
- ISBN: 0-7869-3260-0 (Paperback edition)
- Followed by: Farthest Reach

Forsaken House is a 2004 fantasy novel by Richard Baker, set in the Dungeons & Dragons Forgotten Realms fictional universe. It is the first novel in the "Last Mythal" series.

== Plot ==
Araevin Teshurr is an elven mage who spends time with a company of human and dwarven adventurers. Upon returning to the elves' secluded home of Evermeet, he becomes embroiled in a deadly attack perpetrated by a group of outcast demon-elves, freed from their 5,000-year imprisonment and seeking revenge. While searching for a trio of mysterious magical stones, Araevin must convince the elves to end their isolation from the rest of Faerun, and band together with the other races to prevent the demon army from overrunning the world.

== Publication history ==
- 2004, USA, Wizards of the Coast ISBN 0-7869-3260-0, Pub date 1 August 2004, Paperback
