= Mage: Such Pain =

Novel by Don Bassingthwaite published in 1995

Such Pain is a novel by Don Bassingthwaite published by Boxtree Ltd in 1995.

== Plot summary ==
Such Pain is a Mage: The Ascension novel in which Aaron Barry must cope with the death of his father and return to his childhood home.

== Reception ==
Andy Butcher reviewed Such Pain for Arcane magazine, rating it a 7 out of 10 overall.

== Reviews ==
- Review by John C. Bunnell (1995) in Dragon Magazine, #219, July 1995
- Review by John D. Owen (1996) in Vector 189
