= Matthew Sernett =

Role-playing game designer

- Occupation: Game designer

Matthew Lee Sernett (also known as Matt Sernett) is a writer and game designer who has worked on AAA titles, mobile games, table-top role-playing games (TT-RPGs), card games, miniature games, board games, and digital classics.

== Career ==
Matt Sernett was part of the SCRAMJET team, led by Richard Baker, with designers James Wyatt, Ed Stark, Michele Carter, Stacy Longstreet, and Chris Perkins; this team was responsible for updating the fictional setting as it would be used for the fourth edition of Dungeons & Dragons which was in development.

His D&D design work includes the third edition Fiend Folio (2003), Monster Manual III (2004), Races of Eberron (2005), Fantastic Locations: Hellspike Prison (2005), Spell Compendium (2005), the third edition Tome of Magic (2006), Tome of Battle (2006), Cormyr: The Tearing of the Weave (2007), and Wizards Presents: Races and Classes (2007), as well as Wizards Presents: Worlds and Monsters (2008). Additionally, he served as Editor-in-Chief of Dragon from February to December 2004.
