= The Best American Poetry 2009 =

2009 book

- Language: English

The Best American Poetry 2009, a volume in The Best American Poetry series, was edited by poet David Wagoner, guest editor, who made the final selections, and David Lehman, the general editor for the series.

This book is the 22nd volume in the most popular annual poetry anthology in the United States.

== See also ==
- 2009 in poetry
