= Farthest Reach =

2005 novel by Richard Baker

- Cover of the first edition
- Author: Richard Baker
- Cover artist: Adam Rex
- Language: English
- Series: The Last Mythal
- Genre: Fantasy novel
- Publisher: Wizards of the Coast
- Publication date: July 2005
- Publication place: United States
- Media type: Print (Paperback)
- Pages: 330 (Paperback edition)
- ISBN: 0-7869-3756-4 (Paperback edition)
- Preceded by: Forsaken House
- Followed by: Final Gate

Farthest Reach is a 2005 fantasy novel by Richard Baker, set in the Dungeons & Dragons Forgotten Realms fictional universe. It is the second novel in the "Last Mythal" series.

== Plot ==
On the heels of her failed assault of Evereska, the demonelf Sarya Dlardrageth retreats in order to regroup. She summons a powerful Outer Planes denizen named Malkizid to her aid, who advises her to make the remaining elven army come to her by inhabiting the site of their most costly defeat – the legendary ruins of Myth Drannor. With the elven army weary, Araevin and the elven leaders must convince the defenders to rally and defeat the demonelf menace forever.

== Publication history ==
- 2005, USA, Wizards of the Coast ISBN 0-7869-3756-4, Pub date 1 July 2005, Paperback

== Reception ==
One reviewer stated: "Farthest Reach is a great sequel, with a problem that continues to hamper the trilogy. The characters are bland and have almost no personalities. It’s amazing that this book still is really good, even with horrible characters that harm the overall experience."
