= Fantastic Locations: City of Peril =

Dungeons & Dragons adventure module

- Code: 959787400
- Rules required: Dungeons & Dragons, 3.5 edition
- Authors: Ed Stark
- First published: April 2007

Fantastic Locations: City of Peril is an adventure module for the 3.5 edition of the Dungeons & Dragons fantasy role-playing game.

== Plot summary ==
Fantastic Locations: City of Peril presents several encounters involving the city of Torenberg, which can be run on their own or as part of a back story that links them together.

== Publication history ==
Fantastic Locations: City of Peril was written by Ed Stark, and was published in April 2007. Cover art was by Ralph Horsley, with interior art by Dave Allsop, Ralph Horsley, and Ron Spencer.
