= Theatrix (role-playing game) =

Tabletop role-playing game

- Theatrix cover
- Designers: David Berkman, Travis Eneix, Brett Hackett
- Publishers: Backstage Press
- Publication: 1993
- Genres: Universal
- Systems: Custom
- Flowchart-based action resolution, with or without dice.

Theatrix is a role playing game that was produced in 1995 by the now-defunct Backstage Press. It was unusual because, unlike most other role-playing games of the time, it did not use dice to resolve actions or determine success.

== Contents ==
Theatrix comes packaged as a 136-page softcover rule book, and also includes 11 loose-leaf cardstock sheets containing flowcharts for planning adventures and resolving plot points.

== Gameplay ==
=== Character generation ===
Each character has a number of numerically-rated attributes and skills, as well as non-numerically-rated personality traits, and unrated 'Descriptors'.

=== Plot Points ===
Descriptors can be a disadvantage, and when they have a negative effect on a character, the player earns Plot Points. Descriptors can also be used to advantage, but in order to do so, the player must spend Plot Points while invoking a specific Descriptor.

=== Actors and Directors ===
Theatrix applies cinematic concepts to role-playing: the players are "Actors" and the GM is the "Director". The Director attempts to frame adventures as if they were screenplays, with a pre-structured plot that consists of a number of agreed-upon acts, scenes, and "pinch-points".

=== Diceless play ===
Unlike other role-playing games that use dice to determine success or failure, in Theatrix, when the plot reaches a "pinch point", the referee has already decided if the Actors have done enough to succeed, so dice are not needed. (Dice are only used to resolve a situation in the rare event that the Director cannot decide if the Actors have succeeded or failed.) This was a new concept at the time of the system's release.

While the Actors cannot change the major structure of the plot, they can influence a scene by spending Plot Points, either to guarantee success or to change a plot point in their favor. The example used in the rule book is of a male character with the "Lady's Man" Descriptor who is about to be assaulted and robbed by a femme fatale; the player invokes the "Lady's Man" Descriptor and spends Plot Points in order to transform the scene from a mugging into a romantic liaison.

=== Distributed directing ===
The game encourages collaborative roleplaying, using what it calls "Distributed Directing": the players may introduce subplots, although the Director still remains responsible for the overall direction of the main plot.

== Publication history ==
In 1993, Backstage Press published the rules for Theatrix, a role-playing game designed and written by David Berkman, Travis Eneix, Andrew Finch, Anthony Gallela and Brett Hackett, with art by Aaron Long. The game was unusual at the time for using storytelling instead of dice to determine successes or failures during the role-playing adventure.

The following year, Backstage published Theatrix Ironwood, the first setting for the Theatrix rules. When Backstage tried to sell the new book at Gen Con that year, they were banned from the convention due to the adult nature of Ironwood's content.

== Reception ==
In the May 1995 edition of Dragon (Issue 217), Lester Smith approached the game skeptically but admitted after play-testing that "This approach to role-playing may be unusual, but it works. The fact of the matter is, playing the game is fun." He liked the tone of the writing, which he called "applaudable", and found the information and rules well-organized, with "a healthy number of clear examples." Smith also liked that the book "teaches a remarkable amount about scripting stories as if they were dramas. That information alone makes the book a valuable resource for game masters." He does warn prospective referees that getting a campaign started would take extra time because "the initial concepts are so unusual" and the referee has to create all of "the specifics of composing skill lists and definitions, attribute ranges, and so on." Smith concluded by giving it a strong recommendation, saying, "I whole-heartedly recommend it as both an entertaining change from the vagaries of dice and an admirable training course in the creation of dramatic adventures. Were I were to teach a college course in role-playing, this game would be required reading."

Sean Holland reviewed Theatrix in White Wolf Inphobia #57 (July, 1995), rating it a 4 out of 5 and stated that "Theatrix is a good addition to the ranks of roleplaying games. The folks at Backstage Press should be proud of their first offering."

In Issue 29 of Australian Realms, Adam Whitt wrote, "This game could change the way you roleplay, if you let it. That's the main criterion before buying this book; you have to be prepared to change, to experiment, to learn new techniques and apply these changes to your roleplaying sessions - otherwise give Theatrix a miss and stick with Bludgeons and Flagons." Whitt enjoyed the writing style, commenting, "Reading such rules in other games can be like eating a sawdust sandwich, but here the text is written with a central extended metaphor that likens roleplaying to the performing arts (interactive theatre and film) which makes it quite entertaining." Whitt noted, "it is a fine technical manual for the art of roleplaying (all styles from hack and slash to angst-ridden navel gazing are catered for) that can be ported to any game system or genre." Whitt concluded, "Theatrix is less a rulebook and more a superb 'how to' for all roleplayers."

== Other reviews ==
- Rollespilsmagasinet Fønix (in Danish) (Issue 9 - August/September 1995)
- Shadis #26 (April, 1996)
