= The Minrothad Guilds =

Dungeons & Dragons supplement

- Authors: Deborah Christian and Kim Eastland
- Genre: Role-playing game
- Publisher: TSR
- Publication date: 1988

The Minrothad Guilds is an accessory for the Dungeons & Dragons fantasy role-playing game. It was written by Deborah Christian and Kim Eastland, and published by TSR in 1988.

== Contents ==
The Minrothad Guilds is a sourcebook that details trading guilds and their islands. The Minrothad Guilds are fictional seaborne merchants, and the book covers life, society, and politics in their lands.

== Publication history ==
The Minrothad Guilds (GAZ9) was written by Deborah Christian and Kim Eastland, with a cover by Clyde Caldwell and interior illustrations by John Lakey, and was published by TSR in 1988. It comprises a 64-page "Dungeon Master's Booklet", a 32-page "Player's Booklet", a large color map, and an outer folder.

== Reception ==
Jim Bambra briefly reviewed The Minrothad Guilds for Dragon magazine #151 (November 1989). Bambra wrote that the book "bring[s] trading adventures into the forefront of fantasy gaming", and that with rules regarding trading, "fame and fortune can now be gained in ways other than mere adventuring".

Lawrence Schick, in his 1991 book Heroic Worlds, stated that The Minrothad Guilds covers "everything you need to know to be an ocean-going merchant".
