= Lords of Darkness =

Tabletop role-playing game supplement

- Cover of Lords of Darkness
- Author: Ed Greenwood, with Deborah Christian, Michael Stackpole, Jennell Jaquays (Note: Credited as Paul Jaquays.), Steve Perrin, Vince Garcia, and Jean Rabe
- Genre: Role-playing game
- Publisher: TSR
- Publication date: 1988
- Pages: 96

Lords of Darkness is the name of two accessories for the fictional Forgotten Realms campaign setting for the Dungeons & Dragons fantasy role-playing game.

== Advanced Dungeons & Dragons 1st edition ==
Lords of Darkness is a collection presenting ten short adventure scenarios that take place in the Forgotten Realms, each of them focusing on undead monsters such as skeletons, ghouls, wights, shadows, mummies, vampires, and ghosts; the book also contains suggestions on role-playing undead and a section called "A Mundane Guide to Wards vs. Undead, Spirits, and Other Entities". The anthology includes adventures and background information dealing with most of the undead monsters commonly encountered in the AD&D game, and although sold as a Forgotten Realms accessory, it is usable with any AD&D campaign.

The book's purpose is to provide short adventures involving undead that can be easily inserted into a campaign. Each of the featured undead has background information provided in the form of either a short piece of fiction describing the undead in action or delivered as a monologue by a knowledgeable non-player character (NPC). New game rules in the book contain additional information and clarify existing game mechanics. The book begins by discussing ways in which undead creatures' energy-draining attacks can be made less devastating to a player character (PC) by using alternatives to the usual level-draining effect. The adventures in Lords of Darkness are designed to be easily dropped into an ongoing campaign, and are mainly dungeon crawls of one form or another. The book introduces the optional rules on Horror Checks, which are made when characters realize just how horrible a monster really is; long-term effects can result from failed checks. Another section discusses the effects that items and substances such as cold iron, garlic, salt, and mirrors have against undead. Also included are new spells for magic-users who choose to specialize in the necromantic arts.

The book features a two-page introduction by Ed Greenwood. It explains that, while the book is set in the Forgotten Realms setting, it can be used in different fantasy campaign settings. The introduction gives details on undead in the Forgotten Realms, advice for a Dungeon Master (DM) to use undead in a campaign, alternatives to some of the more deadly powers of the undead, and information on non-evil types of undead.

"Tales From Beyond the Grave" (pages 4–75) presents ten complete adventure scenarios, each one highlighting a "classic" undead type, with the challenges increasing from one scenario to the next. Creature notes accompany each adventure. The scenarios are from five to nine pages each, and include the following: "Skeletons", by Deborah Christian; "Zombies", by Michael Stackpole; "Ghouls and Ghasts", by Jennell Jaquays; "The Tombs of Deckon Thar", by Steve Perrin; "Shadows", by Christian; "Mummies", by Jaquays; "Vampires", by Vince Garcia and Jean Rabe; "Ghosts", by Garcia; "Oriental Spectres", by Christian; and "The Dread Lair of Alokkair", by Greenwood.

"The Night Gallery" (pages 75–84) details the main character or creature of each adventure and can be used to plan a series of encounters. "A Mundane Guide to Wards", by Greenwood (pages 85–91), explores the magic and lore of dealing with undead. "The Lords of Darkness", by Greenwood (pages 92–96), presents new spells for necromancers.

Cover art for Lords of Darkness was done by Jeff Easley and interior art by Karl Waller, and the book was published by TSR in 1988 as a ninety-six page book. Editing was by Scott Martin Bowles, and cartography by Dave LaForce. This supplement was perfect bound, and released for the first edition of Advanced Dungeons & Dragons with product code TSR 9240.

== Dungeons & Dragons 3rd edition ==
Lords of Darkness
- Author: Jason Carl and Sean K. Reynolds
- Genre: Role-playing game
- Publisher: Wizards of the Coast
- Publication date: 2001
- Pages: 192

The second Lords of Darkness was released for the third edition of Dungeons & Dragons. The book was published in November 2001, and was written by Jason Carl and Sean K. Reynolds. Cover art was by Mark Zug, with interior art by Adam Rex, Anthony Francisco, Matt Cavotta, Carl Critchlow, Michael Dubisch, Mike Dutton, Raven Mimura, Puddnhead, Stephanie Pui-Mun Law, Richard Sardinha, and Kalman Andrasofszky.

The 192 page accessory details twenty-eight villainous groups, contains maps of evil strongholds, and includes new spells, feats, and magic items. The book presents five prestige classes: Darkmask, Entropist, Spur Lord, Thayan Knight, and Zhentarim Skymage. Monsters such as the Daemonfey appear in this book.

== Reception ==
The original Lords of Darkness was a Gamer's Choice award-winner.

Jim Bambra reviewed Lords of Darkness for Dragon magazine No. 151 (November 1989). Bambra felt that the style of presentation for the fictional pieces describing the undead in action "is far superior to the dry style adopted by many supplement writers". He noted that four of the adventures lack maps, reducing their usefulness as plug-in scenarios, and that two adventures "are set in castles that cry out for at least schematic diagrams to show their layouts". Bambra felt that the quality of the adventures also varies greatly, and that while most are "fairly good", he continued "[a] few are so thin and underdeveloped that I wondered why they were included". He contended that the adventure dealing with zombies is "the worst of the lot", partly because the characters would be facing "opponents who are likely to stomp them into the ground", but called the mummies' tomb and the lich's lair "fine examples of the dungeon designer's art". He called the optional Horror Check rules "a laudable attempt to instill fear of the undead but not sufficiently developed to be effective", because "the system isn't integrated into the AD&D rules in a satisfactory manner, as characters will deteriorate to the stage where they are unable to function effectively—a situation contrary to the spirit of the game and more in keeping with the grim tone of Chaosium's Call of Cthulhu game". Bambra said the accessory "expands greatly on the background of undead in the AD&D game and provides a source of short adventure settings." He also said it was a good resource in terms of "new necromantic spells" and "information on the ecologies of the undead", but concluded: "its lack of maps and the underdevelopment of some of its adventures make it a merely useful rather than essential item."

== Reviews ==
- Black Gate #4
- Backstab #36
