= The Crimson Gold =

2003 novel by Voronica Whitney-Robinson

- Paperback edition cover
- Author: Voronica Whitney-Robinson
- Cover artist: Mark Zug
- Language: English
- Series: The Rogues
- Genre: Fantasy novel
- Publisher: Wizards of the Coast
- Publication date: December 2003
- Publication place: United States
- Media type: Print (paperback)
- Pages: 320 (paperback edition)
- ISBN: 0-7869-3120-5
- OCLC: 53465618
- LC Class: CPB Box no. 2280 vol. 15
- Preceded by: The Black Bouquet
- Followed by: The Yellow Silk

The Crimson Gold is a fantasy novel by Voronica Whitney-Robinson, set in the Forgotten Realms fictional universe. It is the third novel in "The Rogues" series.

== Plot summary ==
This novel is set in Thay. A rogue wanted out, wanted a new life and a trophy worthy of a master thief - the source of the treasured crimson gold. She wanted to face an undead emperor on his home ground and live to tell the tale.

== Publication history ==
- 2003, USA, Wizards of the Coast ISBN 0-7869-3120-5, Pub date 1 December 2003, Paperback.

== Reception ==
One reviewer stated "Overall, The Crimson Gold by Voronica Whitney-Robinson is a nice addition to the Forgotten Realms world of books." Another reviewer felt that Tazi was the best part of the book.
