= Stacy Longstreet =

American artist

Stacy Longstreet is an art director who has worked primarily on role-playing games.

== Career ==
Stacy Longstreet was part of the SCRAMJET team, led by Richard Baker, with designers James Wyatt, Matthew Sernett, Ed Stark, Michele Carter, and Chris Perkins; this team was responsible for updating the fictional setting as it would be used for the fourth edition of Dungeons & Dragons which was in development.
