= Storm Dragon =

Novel by James Wyatt

- Cover of the first edition
- Language: English
- Genre: Fantasy novel
- Publication place: United States
- Media type: Print (Paperback)

Storm Dragon is the first novel of The Draconic Prophecies series, by James Wyatt. It takes place in the Eberron campaign setting for the Dungeons & Dragons fantasy role-playing game.

== Publication history ==
Storm Dragon was written by James Wyatt and published in May 2008. This is the first novel of The Draconic Prophecies.

== Plot ==
Gaven d'Lyrandar, his mind broken by the ancient Prophecy of the Dragons, has been rotting in Dreadhold for over twenty years. He is rescued by a band of adventurers loyal to Haldren, his only companion in his time at the terrible prison, but he begins to get the feeling that he is just a tool. A dragon named Vaskar has hired them to help him fulfill a prophecy and become the Storm Dragon. In exchange, he promises to grant Haldren the throne of a reunited Galifar. Gaven escapes and continues to run from the Sentinel Marshals, but along the way he discovers that he has the power of the Storm Dragon. Just as Haldren is gathering an army to stage a battle and fulfill another part of the prophecy, thus signaling "The sundering of the Soul Reaver's gates", Gaven begins heading towards the Soul Reaver, where he faces Vaskar and defeats him in battle, creating a spear from the Eye of Siberys (a dragonshard). Ultimately, Gaven faces the Soul Reaver in battle and destroys it by destroying the Heart of Khyber (another dragonshard).

== Reception ==
A reviewer from Publishers Weekly commented that "While the setting may be rather confusing for readers unfamiliar with the Eberron milieu, Wyatt (In the Claws of the Tiger) effectively mixes political intrigue with action. This high-stakes adventure, full of violence, magic and suspense, should entertain gamers and epic fantasy fans."

== Sources ==
- Wyatt, James. Storm Dragon. 1st ed. 1 vols. Newport: Wizards of the Coast, 2007. 1-371. Print.
