= The Draconic Prophecies =

Book series by James Wyatt

The Draconic Prophecies is a series of books by James Wyatt and published by Wizards of the Coast. It consists of three books: Storm Dragon, Dragon Forge, and Dragon War.
