= Andrew Finch =

American designer

- Occupation: Game designer

Andrew J. Finch is a game designer who has worked primarily on role-playing games.

== Career ==
Early in his career Finch did design work on the role playing system Theatrix. He was hired by Wizards of the Coast in 1996, and held a number of different positions. A chart of monster statistics he developed after the release of Dungeons & Dragons 3rd edition was used extensively in further revisions of the game. Finch was ultimately working as the director of digital game design when he was laid off in 2008.

His D&D design work includes Monster Manual III (2004).

Finch was one of the designers on the "Lorwyn" set (2007) for Magic: The Gathering.
