= Jim Pavelec =

American fantasy/horror artist

- Born: Illinois
- Known for: Fantasy art

James Pavelec (born 1972) is an American artist who started as a freelance illustrator creating artwork for fantasy role-playing games and collectible card games before moving to creating artwork for himself. He is also the co-founder of Professional Artist Client Toolkit (PACT).

== Early life and education ==
James Pavelec was born in Illinois, where comic books, horror movies such as The Exorcist — which he watched at age 2 — and the artwork of Frank Frazetta had a major influence on his career. Pavelec earned a Bachelor of Fine Arts from Washington University in St. Louis.

== Career ==
Following graduation, Pavelec first became a bouncer for several years before becoming a freelance fantasy illustrator. He was quite successful, creating works for Wizards of the Coast, (including Dungeons & Dragons, Forgotten Realms, and over thirty illustrations for Magic: The Gathering), History Channel/Triking Games, Alderac Entertainment, Z-Man Games, Fantasy Flight Games, Sabertooth Games, Hidden City Games, White Wolf Press, Atlas Games, Goodman Games, Green Ronin Publishing, Warhammer Fantasy, Hekaforge, Issaries Inc., E. E. Knight, Heavy Metal Magazine, Comics Buyer’s Guide, and Scrye.

His Dungeons & Dragons work included interior art for Races of Faerûn (2003), Unapproachable East (2003), Underdark (2003), Unearthed Arcana (2004), Planar Handbook (2004), Expanded Psionics Handbook (2004), Player's Guide to Faerûn (2004), Complete Divine (2004), Serpent Kingdoms (2004), Lost Empires of Faerûn (2005), Rules Compendium (2007), Thunderspire Labyrinth (2008), King of the Trollhaunt Warrens (2008), and Martial Power (2008).

His comics work included Star Wars: Knights of the Old Republic (2009) for Dark Horse.

Pavelec became well known for his imaginative illustrations — in 2011, E. E. Knight dedicated his Vampire Earth novel March in Country to "Jim Pavelec, the acknowledged master of Monsters from the Id" — and Pavelec was the guest artist at several conventions, including Motor City Comic Con 1998, and LepreCon 1999.

== Technique ==
Artwork commissioned by Hidden City Entertainment for their chip-throwing game Clout Fantasy, created by Pavelec in 2005 using Photoshop to enhance a sketch.

Pavelec started using technology for his oil paintings, sometimes uploading a sketch to digital software such as ArtRage, Procreate, or Photoshop, then printing out the image and use pastels on it, scanning that image and printing a larger copy to mount on Masonite, where he would finish the painting with acrylics and then oil paints. Pavelec also developed a system of using Photoshop on a sketch to render a finished image.

For pencil sketches, Pavelec uses toned paper, transferring organic textures from rocks and fossils using powdered graphite before finishing with gray pastels to bring up highlights.

== PACT ==
Although Pavalec was well known in the fantasy illustration field, he felt that working conditions were getting worse as time progressed. In 2013, he wrote "I have spent fifteen years as a fulltime freelance illustrator in the tabletop gaming and comics industries. In that time the pay and conditions under which illustrators are asked to work have steadily degraded. At conventions, on the phone with my artist friends, and online I heard the same complaints over and over again, but nothing was being done to address these issues. The most that any of us could do as individuals was tell the art directors we were working for of our concerns." In order to give other freelance illustrators as much information about the industry as possible he co-founded the website "Professional Artist Client Toolkit" ("PACT") in January 2014.

== Horror artist ==
By age 40, Pavelec felt he was taking too many commissions with short turnaround times, and as a result his artwork was stagnating. Pavelec made the decision to cut back on freelance work and concentrate on his own artwork. The resultant drop in income forced Pavelec to take part-time jobs, working in a gym for minimum wage, and becoming a Lyft driver.

But the move away from piece work allowed Pavelec to concentrate on the creative process. Taking inspiration from the Ars Goetia, a 17th century grimoire listing more than 70 different demons, Pavelec focused on the horror art genre.

== Author ==
Pavelec has authored a number of "how-to-draw" books including Hell Beasts: How to Draw Grotesque Fantasy Creatures (2007), and Wreaking Havoc: How To Create Fantasy Warriors And Wicked Weapons (2008).
