= Bound by Iron =

2007 fantasy novel by Edward Bolme

- Cover of the first edition
- Language: English
- Series: The Inquisitives
- Genre: Fantasy novel
- Published: 2007
- Publication place: United States
- Media type: Print (Paperback)
- ISBN: 978-0-7869-4264-0

Bound by Iron is a fantasy novel by Edward Bolme, set in the world of Eberron, and based on the Dungeons & Dragons role-playing game. It is the first novel in "The Inquisitives" series. It was published in paperback in April 2007.

== Plot summary ==
Bound by Iron is a novel in which the human priest Cimozjen, elf Minrah Penwright, and an emancipated warforged seek to find out who is behind a deadly plot.

== Reception ==
Pat Ferrara of mania.com comments: "Despite the low grade I gave Bound by Iron, there's no doubt that Edward Bolme can write. His pacing builds a tremendous amount of momentum near the end of the novel and his subtle details really help flesh out a land trying to recover from the aftershocks of a horrific war. Interposed with the main plot are also flashbacks of Cimozjen's days in the Iron Band, where an otherwise inanimate Torval really comes to life and establishes the deep friendship which really motivates the entire investigation. All these things work together to tell a compelling story, yet there are some snags that I had trouble moving beyond."
