= Voyage of the Mourning Dawn =

Novel by Rich Wulf

- Author: Rich Wulf
- Cover artist: Thomas Thiemeyer
- Language: English
- Genre: Fantasy novel
- Publication place: United States
- Media type: Print (Paperback)
- ISBN: 0-7869-4006-9
- Followed by: Flight of the Dying Sun

Voyage of the Mourning Dawn is a fantasy novel by Rich Wulf based on the Dungeons & Dragons role-playing game, set in the world of Eberron.

== Plot summary ==
After Seren's father died at the end of the Last War, she left home to strike out on her own. She found herself apprenticed to a master thief, but when her master is betrayed by an employer and murdered, Seren finds herself joining the crew of the very airship that she had robbed. Together they begin the search for the lost item called the Legacy of Ashrem that could change the entire world.

== Publication history ==
Voyage of the Mourning Dawn by Rich Wulf is a 320-page mass paperback published in 2006 by Wizards of the Coast with cover art by Thomas Thiemeyer. It is the first novel in the "Heirs of Ash" trilogy:

1. Voyage of the Mourning Dawn
2. Flight of the Dying Sun (2007)
3. Rise of the Seventh Moon (2007)

== Reception ==
Voyage of the Mourning Dawn was #8 on CBR's 2020 "10 Of The Best DnD Stories To Start Off With" list — the article states that "The Voyage Of The Mourning Dawn highlights many things that make Eberron a unique setting. From featuring how the setting treats magic more like technology to highlighting how some D & D races are reimagined for this setting."
