= Richard Baker (game designer) =

American author and game designer

L. Richard Baker III
- Born: Florida, U.S.
- Education: Virginia Polytechnic Institute and State University
- Occupation: Game designer
- Spouse: Kim Rohrbach
- Writing career
- Genres: Role-playing games, fantasy, science fiction

Richard Baker (full name L. Richard Baker III) is an American author and game designer who has worked on many Dungeons & Dragons campaign settings.

== Early life, education, and military ==
Rich Baker was born and raised in Florida, then moved with his family to New Jersey at age ten. Baker graduated from Virginia Tech in 1988 with a degree in English. He received a commission as an ensign in the U.S. Navy, and served as a deck officer for three years on board the USS Tortuga; he qualified as a Surface Warfare Officer and was a lieutenant (junior grade) by the time he left the Navy. Baker married his college sweetheart, Kim Rohrbach. They have two daughters, Alex and Hannah.

== Career ==
Baker began looking for a new career, and found one at TSR. "I'd been playing the AD&D game off and on since 1979. When I decided to leave the Navy, I sent TSR my résumé just for the pure hell of it. TSR sent me back a writing test, which I must have done pretty well on, since they brought me out for an interview in September of 1991. I'd never published a word before then or even worked the convention circuit, but they hired me anyway."

After joining TSR in 1991, Rich worked on most of TSR's product lines at one point or another. By 1998, he had published over thirty game products and many magazine articles. Baker started out writing game products such as Rock of Bral for the Spelljammer line, as well as material for the Forgotten Realms, Planescape, and Ravenloft settings. Baker and Colin McComb co-designed the Birthright campaign setting. The Birthright Campaign Setting boxed set won the 1995 Origins Award for Best New Role-Playing Supplement: "I'm very proud of it. It represents an entirely new approach to the traditional fantasy roleplaying campaign, and the world itself is filled with a strong sense of history." Baker also oversaw the development of the Player's Option series of second edition AD&D manuals, stating "I greatly enjoyed the work I did on the World Builder's Guidebook".

Baker went on to co-design the Alternity science fiction game: "As much as I am proud of my other work, I probably learned the most from the work Bill [Slavicsek] and I put into the Alterity game system. Designing a new roleplaying game from the ground up is an immensely complicated undertaking, and I'm very pleased with the way it turned out." Alternity was completed while TSR was still in operation and was meant to replace Amazing Engine as the generic science-fiction role-playing game system for the company, but it was not released; the game was later released by Wizards of the Coast after they bought TSR. Aside from various Alternity products, Baker also worked on the Star*Drive and Dark•Matter settings for the game, and worked as Creative Director on them for a time. Baker wrote several novels for various settings as well.

His game work includes Dungeons & Dragons (3rd and 4th Edition), Axis & Allies Miniatures, Axis & Allies Naval Miniatures: War at Sea, and numerous Dungeons & Dragons adventures and sourcebooks.

Rich lived in New Jersey, Virginia, Rhode Island, Virginia again, Louisiana, Virginia a third time, and Wisconsin, but now lives in Auburn, Washington, with his wife Kim, two daughters, and cats. He's a fan of Golden Age SF and the Philadelphia Phillies.

Rich was at the forefront of Wizards of the Coast's range of Forgotten Realms and core Third Edition D&D accessory books, and author of several novels set in and below Faerûn. He also answered questions about the Forgotten Realms at the Wizards website's forums – see the below external links.

Baker led the SCRAMJET team, which consisted of James Wyatt, Matt Sernett, Ed Stark, Michele Carter, Stacy Longstreet, and Chris Perkins; this team updated the setting and cosmology of D&D as the fourth edition was being developed. Baker and Bruce Cordell wrote a new release of the Gamma World Roleplaying Game (2010), which was based on the rules for fourth edition D&D. He also headed design on the 4th edition D&D iteration of the Dark Sun Campaign Setting, along with numerous other credits for that edition of the game.

He was also at the forefront of designing the series "Axis and Allies: War at Sea", a game of tactical World War II naval battles.

On December 14, 2011, Baker announced on his Wizards.com community page that Wizards of the Coast had eliminated his position and he would no longer be an employee of the company. He acknowledged the possibility that he would continue to write for the Forgotten Realms novel line, and hoped to continue design work on the company's miniature lines on a freelance basis.

In 2020, Baker announced on his blog that he was joining ZeniMax Online Studios as a senior writer on the Elder Scrolls Online video game.

== Bibliography ==
=== Forgotten Realms Accessory Books/Adventure Modules ===
- Unapproachable East (2003)
- Player's Guide to Faerûn (2004)

Creative Director of:

- Magic of Faerûn (2001)
- Lords of Darkness (2001)
- Races of Faerûn (2003)

Developer of:

- Forgotten Realms Campaign Setting (2001)
- Lords of Darkness (2001)
- Races of Faerûn (2003)
- Unapproachable East (2003)
- Underdark (2003)

=== Dark-Sun Accessory Books/Adventure Modules ===
- Valley of Dust and Fire (1992)
- The Will and the Way: Psionicists of Athas (1994)
- Dragon's Crown (1993)
- Merchant House of Amketch (1993)

=== Other Dungeons & Dragons Accessory Books/Adventure Modules ===
- Spells & Magic (1996)
- World Builder's Guidebook (1996)
- Planescape Monstrous Compendium II (Planescape) (1999)
- The Forge of Fury (2000)
- Complete Arcane (2004)
- Tome of Battle (2006)
- Red Hand of Doom (2006)
- Lost Mine of Phandelver (2014)

=== Gamma World 7th Edition ===
- Gamma World Roleplaying Game Rulebook (with Bruce R. Cordell) (2010)
- Gamma World Roleplaying Game Expansion: Legion of Gold (with Bruce R. Cordell) (2011)

=== Novels ===
- The Adventures
  - The Shadow Stone (1998)
- Double Diamond Triangle Saga
  - Easy Betrayals (1998)
- Star*Drive
  - Zero Point (1999)
- Birthright
  - The Falcon and the Wolf (2000 online publication )
- The Cities
  - The City of Ravens (2000)
- (R.A. Salvatore's) War of the Spider Queen
  - Condemnation (2003)
- The Last Mythal
  - Forsaken House (2004)
  - Farthest Reach (2005)
  - Final Gate (2006)
- Blades of Moonsea
  - The Swordmage (2008)
  - Corsair (2009)
  - Avenger (2010)
- Breaker of Empires
  - Valiant Dust (2017)
  - Restless Lightning (2018)
  - Scornful Stars (2019)

=== Board games ===
- Risk Godstorm (2004)
- Ultimate Scheme (2017)
