= Jacqueline West (author) =

American writer of children's fiction

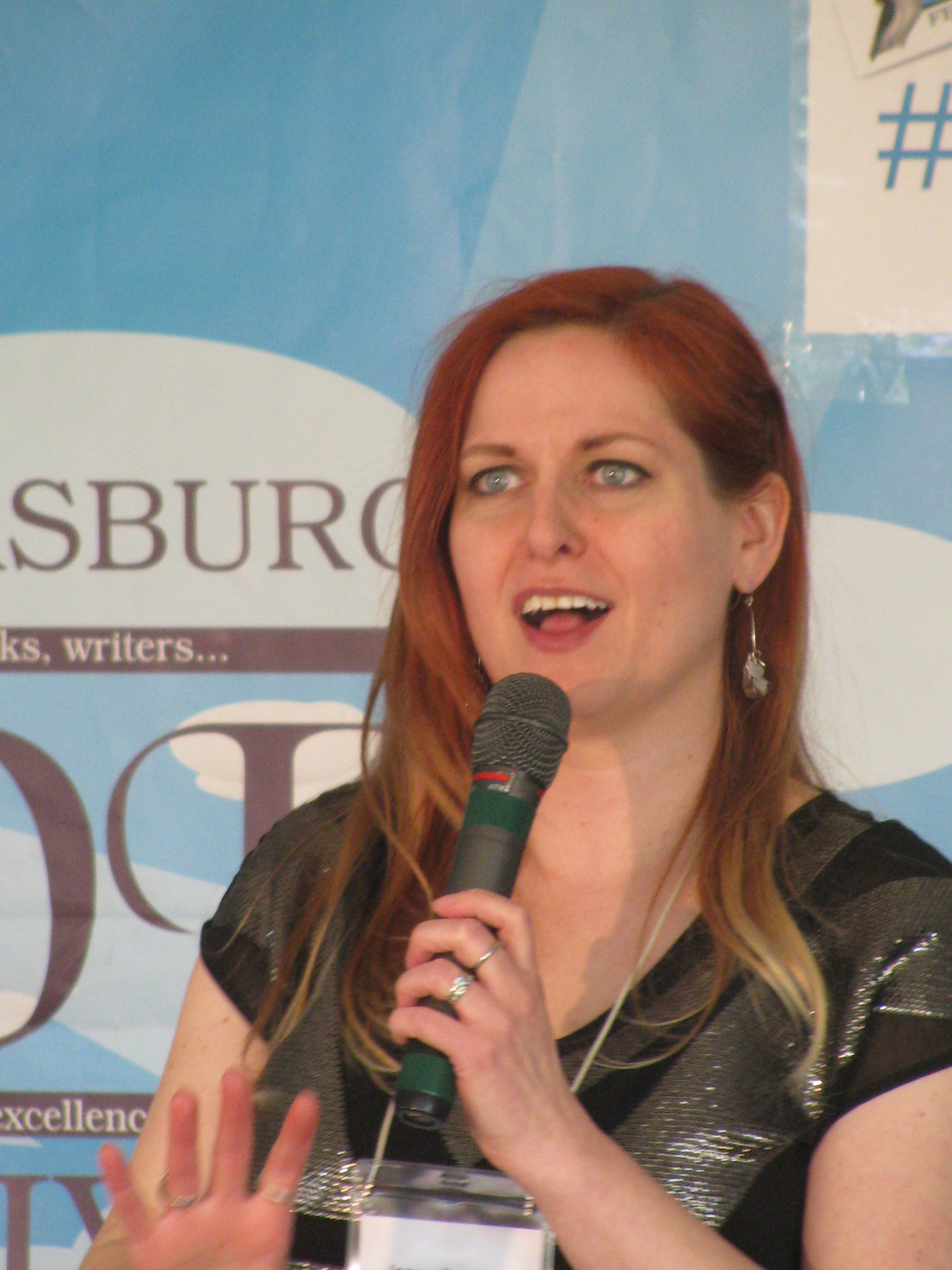
- West at the 2014 Gaithersburg Book Festival
- Born: Jacqueline Cobian; December 29, 1979 (age 46); Red Wing, Minnesota, United States
- Education: University of Wisconsin-Eau Claire
- Occupation: Writer
- Spouse: Ryan West
- Writing career
- Period: 2005–present
- Genres: Children's fantasy, poetry
- Website: jacquelinewest.com

Jacqueline West (born December 29, 1979) is an American writer of children's fiction and poet. Her poetry has been nominated for the Pushcart Prize and her Books of Elsewhere fantasy series has appeared on the New York Times Best Seller list.

== Early life and education ==
Jacqueline West was born in Red Wing, Minnesota, and was raised in River Falls, Wisconsin, where she graduated from River Falls High School in 1998. She completed a degree at the University of Wisconsin-Eau Claire, and has studied at the University of Wisconsin-Madison and Edgewood College. She currently resides in Red Wing, Minnesota.

== Career ==
West is the author of The Books of Elsewhere, a children's literature series published by Dial Books for Young Readers, a division of Penguin Group USA. Beyond work with fiction, West also publishes poetry. Her chapbook of poetry about Czech immigrants to western Minnesota, Cherma, was published by the University of Wisconsin's Parallel Press in March, 2010. Additionally, she has been an arts and theater reviewer for Isthmus, a newspaper in Madison, Wisconsin. She was nominated for the Pushcart Prize for Poetry twice.

In 2008, she won the Dorothy Sargent Rosenberg prize for poetry, and she was a finalist for the Minnesota Book Awards in 2011, 2012, 2019, and 2022. Her book The Shadows was a finalist for the 2011–2012 Texas Bluebonnet Award, the 2013 Louisiana Young Readers' Choice Awards (Grades 3–5), and the 2013 Illinois Bluestem Award.

West was the winner of the 2022 Minnesota Book Award for Middle Grade Literature for her 2021 book Long Lost.

== Works ==
- Cherma (Parallel Press, March 2010), ISBN 978-1-9347-9511-8
- Dreamers Often Lie (Dial Books, April 5, 2016), ISBN 978-0-8037-3863-8
- Candle and Pins. Alban Lake Publishing. 8 February 2018. ISBN 978-1087815046.
- The Story Pirates Present: Digging Up Danger. Penguin Random House. 15 January 2019. ISBN 9781635650914., Illustrated by Hatem Aly
- Last Things. Harper Collins. 7 May 2019. ISBN 9780062875068.
- Long Lost. Harper Collins. 18 May 2021. ISBN 9780062691750.

The Books of Elsewhere

- The Shadows. Penguin Group US. 15 June 2010. ISBN 978-1-101-43479-6., illustrated by Poly Bernatene
- Spellbound: The Books of Elsewhere. Penguin Group US. 12 July 2011. ISBN 978-1-101-51701-7.
- The Second Spy: The Books of Elsewhere. Penguin Group US. 5 July 2012. ISBN 978-1-101-57552-9.
- The Strangers. Penguin Group US. 16 July 2013. ISBN 978-1-101-59382-0.
- Still Life: The Books of Elsewhere, Penguin, 2014, ISBN 9780698147904

The Collectors

- The Collectors. Harper Collins. 9 October 2018. ISBN 9780062691699.
- The Collectors #2, A Storm of Wishes. Harper Collins. 22 October 2019. ISBN 9780062691729.
