= Don Bassingthwaite =

Canadian author

- Born: Meaford, Ontario, Canada
- Education: Georgian Bay District Secondary School
- Alma mater: University of Toronto
- Occupations: Author, novelist
- Writing career
- Genres: fantasy, dark fantasy

Don Bassingthwaite is a Canadian author from Toronto.

== Early life and education ==
Bassingthwaite was born in Meaford, Ontario. He played Dungeons & Dragons in high school, attending the Georgian Bay District Secondary School where his project on the root of squares won the senior secondary division, and for his application of computers he won the District 23 of the Ontario Secondary School Teachers' Federation book awards. He was one of four Georgian Bay Secondary School Grade 13 students who earned the Wilfrid Laurier University scholarship by winning the Reach for the Top district finals, and was the co-recipient of the three grade 13 English awards for the Meaford Graduation diplomas at Georgian Bay Secondary School.

Bassingthwaite continued playing Dungeons & Dragons while earning a B.A. in anthropology at the University of Toronto. He was a student in the master of museum studies program, also working part-time in the university bookstore, and remained involved in the school while starting his professional career, and in 1995 he began a two-year assignment running the UT Press's (UTP) Custom Publishing Service which he considered his fondest achievement.

== White Wolf Publishing ==
Bassingthwaite started writing fiction in his spare time, and submitted a story to Dragon magazine that was rejected. In 1993 at age 22, during his first year of graduate studies, he submitted a story called "Book of the Dead" to White Wolf Publishing, set in their world of Vampire: The Masquerade. White Wolf used this story in a supplemental book for the Vampire game. Bassingthwaite also sold another short story to White Wolf that was published in an anthology.

In 1995, during his second year of graduate studies, he was offered a fiction contract by White Wolf that led to Such Pain, a novel set in White Wolf's World of Darkness universe. He followed this immediately with another World of Darkness novel, Pomegranates Full and Fine, and Breathe Deeply.

He wrote the novel As One Dead with Nancy Kilpatrick, to which reviewer Neil Barton commented that it and other vampire novels he reviewed "were competently told, but all spotlighted a shortcoming of this type of tale: the absence of any significant human presence from these stories robs the vampire characters of their power to horrify."

== Wizards of the Coast ==
Bassingthwaite has written fiction for Wizards of the Coast set in the Dungeons & Dragons worlds.

=== Alternity ===
After Bassingthwaite graduated with Master of Museum Studies, he wrote another novel for the World of Darkness setting, Breathe Deeply (1999), but he then started to look at new worlds being developed by Wizards of the Coast (WotC) for their science fiction role-playing game Alternity. He pitched an idea for a novel set in their Star*Drive space opera setting, but WotC was not interested. He then pitched a story idea for their Dark•Matter setting; this was accepted in 2000, and became If Whispers Call, the second of four Dark•Matter novels written by various authors. Bassingthwaite also wrote the fifth novel of the series, By Dust Consumed, but submitted it for publication in 2001 just as WotC cancelled the Alternity line of products; it was never published, but was made available as a PDF for a limited time.

=== Forgotten Realms ===
With the end of the Alternity line, Bassingthwaite switched over to WotC's popular Forgotten Realms setting, and wrote the last book of The Rogues series, The Yellow Silk (2004), as well as the second book of the Realms of the Dragons series, Beer with a Fat Dragon (2004).

=== Eberron ===
In 2002, WotC had staged a contest to create a new setting for Dungeons & Dragons v3.5; the winner was Keith Baker's Eberron. When the Eberron setting was published in 2004, Bassingthwaite pitched an idea for a series of Eberron novels. The result was The Dragon Below series: The Binding Stone (2005), The Grieving Tree (2006), and The Killing Song (2006). Reviewer Pat Ferrara recommended the series, saying, "Don Bassingthwaite created an easily accessible series with plenty of action and great personalities. If you’re looking for a fun and engrossing trilogy to sink your teeth into look no further than this trilogy."

After finishing The Dragon Below series, Bassingthqaite decided to become a full-time writer, and his next assignment was a new series concerning events in Eberron's goblin nation of Darguun using some of the characters from The Dragon Below; this became The Legacy of the Dhakaan series: The Doom of Kings (2008), The Word of Traitors (2009), and The Tyranny of Ghosts (2010).

=== Dungeons & Dragons 4E ===
When WotC published the fourth edition of Dungeons & Dragons, the default setting for adventures was the Nentir Vale. Bassingthwaite created The Abyssal Plague trilogy set in the Nentir Vale: The Temple of Yellow Skulls (2011), Oath of Vigilance (2011), and The Eye of the Chained God (2012).

== Editor: Black Gate ==
For a number of years, Bassingthwaite was also a contributing editor for Black Gate, writing a games and books review column. Theodore Beale called it "one of the longest and best game review columns I’ve ever read, (13 pages!), concentrating primarily on RPG books."

Bassingthwaite also contributed a number of short stories. In Issue 5 (Spring 2003), Bassingthwaite wrote his first sword & sorcery short story, "Barbarian Instinct". Alan Lattimore, on the review site Tangent Online, wrote "Cacia is a loved and indulged daughter of a well respected city merchant. Pawel is the Barbarian fighter hired to guard her and guide her from the city to safety. [...] Cacia and Pawel are both engaging characters, their situation is credible, their interaction set off sparks and their ultimate acceptance of the value of the other feels solid. A nice tale well told."

== Other fiction ==
In 2012, Bassinghtwaite contributed a short story to the dark science fiction and music anthology Foreshadows: The Ghosts of Zero.

In 2016, he published a collection of comedy horror short stories, Cocktails at Seven, Apocalypse at Eight, featuring the gay protagonist Derby Cavendish. Reviewer Heather Grove enjoyed the book, calling it "marvellous [...] The characters are fantastic, with plenty of hilarity and depth to them. The world of otherworldly creatures is built well, with a glamour that helps to keep the ordinary people from remembering the strange things that go on around them."

== Bibliography ==
World of Darkness

- Such Pain (1995, ISBN 978-0-06-105463-1)
- Pomegranates Full and Fine (1995, ISBN 978-1-56504-889-8)
- Breathe Deeply (1995, ISBN 978-1-56504-881-2)
- "Smoke", short story contained in Book of the Kindred (1996, ISBN 978-1-56504-869-0, originally published as Book of the Dead in 1993)
- As One Dead (with Nancy Kilpatrick, 1996, ISBN 978-1-56504-875-1)

Dark•Matter

- If Whispers Call (2000, ISBN 978-0-7869-1679-5)
- By Dust Consumed (2002, published electronically)

Dungeons & Dragons
Forgotten Realms

- The Rogues series
  - The Yellow Silk (2004, ISBN 978-0-7869-3152-1)
- Mistress of the Night (With Dave Gross, 2004, ISBN 0-7869-3346-1)

Eberron

- The Dragon Below trilogy
  - The Binding Stone (2005, ISBN 978-0-7869-3784-4)
  - The Grieving Tree (2006, ISBN 978-0-7869-3985-5)
  - The Killing Song (2006, ISBN 978-0-7869-4243-5)
- The Legacy of the Dhakaan trilogy
  - The Doom of Kings (2008, ISBN 978-0-7869-4918-2)
  - Word of Traitors (2009, ISBN 978-0-7869-5196-3)
  - The Tyranny of Ghosts (2010, ISBN 978-0-7869-5506-0)

Nentir Vale

- The Abyssal Plague Trilogy
  - The Temple of Yellow Skulls (March 2011, ISBN 978-0-7869-5749-1)
  - Oath of Vigilance (August 2011, ISBN 978-0-7869-5816-0)
  - The Eye of the Chained God (April 2012, ISBN 978-0-7869-5983-9)

Science Fiction

- "Too Much Is Never Enough" - Foreshadows: The Ghosts of Zero (February 2012, ISBN 978-1-4675-1060-8)

Comedy horror

- Cocktails at Seven, Apocalypse at Eight (2016)

Short stories

- "Barbarian Instinct" (published in Black Gate, Issue 5, Spring 2003)

== Interviews ==
- "Interview with Don Bassingthwaite conducted by Pat Ferrara". Mania.com. January 2007. Archived from the original on September 27, 2007.
