= World Builder's Guidebook =

Tabletop role-playing game supplement

- Cover
- Genre: Role-playing games
- Publisher: TSR
- Publication date: 1996

World Builder's Guidebook is an accessory for the 2nd edition of the Advanced Dungeons & Dragons fantasy role-playing game, published in 1996.

== Contents ==
World Builder's Guidebook is a supplement that explores different ways to design a game world to help the Dungeon Master create a unique fictional universe (in this case, a fantasy setting) from scratch. The end of the book contains various blank maps, including grids to draw a whole planet in overview as well as smaller separate regions and individual nations.

== Reception ==
David Comford reviewed World Builder's Guidebook for Arcane magazine, rating it a 9 out of 10 overall. He commented that "At one time or another I would wager everyone reading arcane has thought wistfully of designing their own roleplaying game. For most of us that is as far as it ever gets – but if you've actually sat down to map out your lands it can suddenly all seem rather daunting. But fear not, The World Builder's Guidebook is a methodical step-by-step guide to creating your own fantasy setting to use in an AD&D universe." Comford adds: "And, what's more, it's good. Better than that, it's excellent, from the shape and size of your world to the climate and racial cultures present, and even further to the ecology and mythology of your land. All can be found here presented in a format that's easy to read and with countless random roll tables." He continues: "Some might think that world creation is a personal thing, and that a book like this takes an element of fun out of its creation. Not so. Yes there are countless pointers and pushes in the right direction, but the option to disregard any and all information that doesn't fit in with your theme is repeated throughout." Comford concludes the review by saying, "The World Builder's Guidebook is either a good reference tool for reminding you of the bits that you've left out, or a comprehensive world creating machine that is easily followed."

== Reviews ==
- Casus Belli #100
