= The Books of Elsewhere =

Book series by Jacqueline West

- The Shadows; Spellbound; The Second Spy; The Strangers; Still Life
- Author: Jacqueline West
- Country: United States
- Language: English
- Genre: Fantasy
- Published: 2010-2014
- No. of books: 5
- Website: www.thebooksofelsewhere.com

The Books of Elsewhere is a series of fantasy novels for kids and young teens by Jacqueline West that centers on the McMartins' house on Linden Street, which has many magical paintings.

There are five Books of Elsewhere:

1. The Shadows (2010)
2. Spellbound (2011)
3. The Second Spy (2012)
4. The Strangers (2013)
5. Still Life (2014)

== Plot summary ==
=== Spellbound ===
Olive, the main character, is worried. After breaking the McMartins' enchanted spectacles in the first book, The Shadows, Olive has no way to get her friend Morton out of Elsewhere, the world in the McMartins' enchanted paintings. The house's three guardian cats, Horatio, Harvey, and Leopold, have been no help in this task.

Harvey hasn't been seen for two days. When Olive finds Harvey, he is watching the kid next door, Rutherford Dewey, getting scolded by his grandmother. The next day, Rutherford confronts Olive about his missing models, which Harvey took. After an exchange, Harvey scolds Olive for being friendly with Rutherford, which Harvey calls a "spy". Rutherford mentions something about a spellbook, and Olive is determined to find it.

Olive searches the library for a spellbook, but in reality, the spellbook is trying to find Olive, and plays tricks on Olive's brain while she sleeps. After a long search, Olive stumbles upon the spellbook, which is held in clasping hands. Olive takes it out, and is amazed by what it says.

The cats sense that Olive is being controlled by the spellbook, and try to snap Olive out of it, but fails. Olive realizes that she is being controlled at Mrs. Dewey's (Rutherford's grandmother) house. Olive finally is snapped out of it, and tries to deal with the spellbook, but Annabelle escapes and will wreak havoc in later books.

=== The Second Spy ===
Olive, the protagonist, is scared of Annabelle (the main antagonist). Having (accidentally) freed her in Spellbound, Olive is starting to believe that death waits around every corner.

At the first day of junior high, Olive is embarrassed. But Olive falls through a hole in her backyard, into a room with all sorts of magical substances. Meanwhile Morton, who is still stuck in Elsewhere, is growing more desperate and tries to get out. Olive makes a deal with Morton: Morton will stay in Elsewhere for three months. If Olive hasn't found his parents by that time, Morton can get out.

Annabelle leaves Olive notes, noting in one that "your own friend is hiding a secret from you." Rutherford says he will be going to a private school in Sweden. Olive feels that Rutherford betrayed her.

Olive has an idea for Morton: If she creates a magical painting of Morton's parents, Morton might actually find his parents! But it goes all wrong, and Olive is banished downstairs by Horatio, who is quite angry at her.

Later that night, Olive finds Horatio, but feels compelled to hide from him. Olive is a little confused by the incident.

In the attic, Olive stumbles on a portrait of Aldous McMartin, but after a fierce confrontation with Aldous, is distracted and lets the portrait slip into Annabelle's hands.

Later, she realizes that there is a painted Horatio, who is an imposter. The two Horatios fight, with the real one getting scratched and scraped and the painted one getting without a hitch. But the fake Horatio gets dunked into the a bathtub full of "everything at once", and is dissolved.

The book ends with Harvey saying "We may not have to fight alone," and Rutherford making a confession about being a mind reader.

=== The Strangers ===
It's Halloween night when strangers come to Linden Street and Olive faces danger when her parents are kidnapped by the enemy. She attempts to get them back without risking bringing back either the grandfather or Annabelle McMartin. She questions whether or not she can trust the strangers who arrive at the house, even when they appear to be allies. In the increasingly tense turn of events, Olive uncovers more secrets about the house, its magic, and the paintings of Elsewhere.

The stakes grow higher, the secrets more dangerous, and mystery and magic abound as Olive, the boys, and the magical cats uncover the true nature of the old stone house on Linden Street.

=== Still Life ===
Annabelle McMartin is gone for good, but something worse lurks just out of sight—watching, waiting, preparing to strike. Then a field trip to the local art museum reveals a shock. What Olive discovers will create a chain of events that propel her to discoveries she may not wish to uncover, involving Morton's vanished parents and the very deepest, darkest roots of Aldous McMartin's creepy painted world. In this fifth and final book, Olive must seek the full, complex story of Elsewhere, its magical origins, and its creator, and in so doing, face her own fears and limitations—and possibly the destruction of Elsewhere itself. How far will Olive go to save the people and home she loves? And what will be the final cost?

== Characters ==
- Olive Dunwoody — Olive Dunwoody is the main character of the book series. Her parents are math experts, yet Olive is not very good at math. She moves into the house on Linden Street. Olive discovers that she can travel inside the mysterious paintings scattered about the house using a set of magical spectacles. Then eventually she goes on an adventure that she never thought was possible.
- Morton Nivens — Morton is Olive's friend. He is actually a painting and Olive meets him in her first encounter with the shadows. Morton is a small boy, and he is still adjusting to being Olive's friend. He wasn't always a painting; before, he was a little boy who lived on Linden Street. Like the other neighbors, Morton got trapped in a painting by the evil Aldous McMartin.
- Rutherford Dewey — Rutherford meets Olive in the second volume, Spellbound. He has curly hair, and is staying with Mrs. Dewey. He and Olive have an uneasy friendship, beginning when Rutherford was helping Olive find the McMartins' spellbook. In the third book, The Second Spy, he reveals he is a reader, a person who can hear people's thoughts.
- Horatio, Harvey, and Leopold — Horatio, Harvey, and Leopold are the house's guardian cats. Horatio is usually the leader and acts like many different made up people in this series. He also guards the main levels of the mansion. He thinks that his fluffy orange coat is just fabulous, and prefers not to get dirty. He is also the first cat introduced in the book. Horatio also doesn't reveal much about the house's secrets. Harvey is a calico, who according to Olive, "is every color in the cat fur rainbow," He guards the attic of the house, and likes to pretend to be historical characters, like pirates or knights. Leopold is the soldier and is very loyal, he's also a very large black cat who guards the dark basement. Specifically, he guards the basement trap door that has Aldous McMartin's urn in it, which Annabelle McMartin is trying to get to bring Aldous McMartin (her grandfather) back to life. Olive forms a special bond with the three talking cats.
- Annabelle McMartin — Annabelle McMartin is the series' main antagonist. She is a witch, and the granddaughter of the late painter Aldous McMartin. In the first novel, The Shadows, she gained Olive's trust, only to get back her golden pendant so she could free her grandfather. She then deserted Olive in the middle of a black lake in a painting. Afterwards she released her grandfather only to have Olive and Morton thwart her plans. She becomes trapped in a painting in the end of the first novel, The Shadows. In the second novel, Spellbound, she is released from her painting by an entranced Olive. She tries to get rid of Olive and Morton by trapping them inside a painting. Morton's older and now grown sister Lucinda prevents her from doing this but is destroyed in the process. Annabelle escapes in the end of the second novel, Spellbound.
- Aldous McMartin — Aldous McMartin is the artist of all the magical paintings inside Olive's home and the first owner of the McMartin mansion. All the neighbors thought he was crazy because he never sold a single painting to anybody who was interested. At the end of the book Annabelle released his ashes from his urn and to come back to life. He returns to his house as a mere shadow where he is destroyed by Olive at the end of the first novel, The Shadows.
- Alice and Alec Dunwoody — Mr. Alec and Mrs. Alice Dunwoody are two mathematicians and are the parents of Olive Dunwoody. In The Books of Elsewhere they are captured in the fourth novel, The Strangers.
- Morton's parents — Their names were Mary and Harold Nivens. They were the parents of both Morton and his older sister Lucinda. The fifth book, Still Life, reveals that Mary was on a mission to spy on Aldous. As part of her cover, she took painting lessons from him. When he realized that she was spying on him, Aldous trapped both her and her husband in separate paintings, from which they were later rescued by Olive.
