= Anthony J. Gallela =

American game designer

- Occupation: Game designer

Anthony J. Gallela is a game designer who has worked primarily on board games and role-playing games.

== Career ==
Anthony J. Gallela was a co-producer for the ManaFest and KublaCon game conventions; a freelance writer for several industry publications; a game store manager; and a consultant and broker for several award-winning games. Gallela was a co-developer of the Theatrix roleplaying game (published by Backstage Press), and the co-designer (with Japji Khalsa) of the adventure game, Dwarven Dig! (from Kenzer & Company), which earned him an Origins Award nomination. Gallela has been the executive director of the Game Manufacturers Association.
