= The Grieving Tree =

2006 novel by Don Bassingthwaite

- Cover of the first edition
- Language: English
- Genre: Fantasy novel
- Published: 2006
- Publication place: United States
- Media type: Print (Paperback)
- ISBN: 0-7869-3985-0

The Grieving Tree is a fantasy novel by Don Bassingthwaite, set in the world of Eberron, and based on the Dungeons & Dragons role-playing game. It is the second novel in "The Dragon Below" series. It was published in paperback in March 2006.

== Plot summary ==
The group from the previous novel, The Binding Stone, is joined by former Bonetree hunter Ashi and hobgoblin dirge singer Ekhaas.

== Reception ==
Pat Ferrara of mania.com comments: "Although constrained somewhat in geographic scope, The Grieving Tree's plot keeps up its fast pace as major narrative points are brought to light and polished. [...] What I liked most about this novel is the sheer subtlety in characterization: a slew of new characters aren’t introduced but the ones that carried over from The Binding Stone show, by their actions, that you've only seen the tip of their personality icebergs. [...] Smooth action and an unresolved final confrontation ensures that the series won’t lose speed as it approaches its final volume."
