= Richard Sardinha =

American artist

Richard Sardinha is an American artist based in Providence, Rhode Island, whose work has appeared in role-playing games.

== Works ==
Richard Sardinha has been illustrating books since the 1980s. He provided the art work for At Lovecraft's Grave (referring to H. P. Lovecraft) by Brett Rutherford.

Sardinha has produced interior illustrations for role-playing game books since 2000. Much of his work has appeared in Dungeons & Dragons books in the game's third edition, such as the Monster Manual (2000), Oriental Adventures (2001), Monsters of Faerûn (2001), Lords of Darkness (2001), Silver Marches (2002), Epic Level Handbook (2002), Monster Manual II (2002), Deities and Demigods (2002), Book of Vile Darkness (2002), Underdark (2003), Ghostwalk (2003), Fiend Folio (2003), Draconomicon (2003), Unearthed Arcana (Dungeons & Dragons) (2004), Shining South (Forgotten Realms) (2004), Complete Divine (Dungeons & Dragons) (2004), Lost Empires of Faerûn (2005), and Lords of Madness (Dungeons & Dragons) (2005). Sardinha has also illustrated books for the Obsidian RPG, Wheel of Time, and Warhammer Fantasy Roleplay.

Sardinha also illustrated cards for the Magic: The Gathering collectible card game.

He was nominated for a Chesley Award in 2005, in the category of Three-Dimensional Art, for "Copper Dragon tiles".
