= Rafael Garres =

Spanish artist

- Born: Barcelona, Spain

Rafael Garrés Cervantes is a Spanish artist who worked in comic-books and role-playing games. He commonly signs as Rafael Garrés or Rafa Garrés.

== Early life and education ==
He was born in Barcelona, Spain. His hometown is Canovelles. Garrés studied at the Massana Art School and at the Faculty of Arts in Barcelona.

== Career ==
He began his career in 1994 with the Spanish role-playing game Superhéroes Inc. In 1996 he was drawing covers for the Spanish editions of Conan, as well as the series Hombres y Bestias for Glénat. Since then, Garres has worked for publishers like DC Comics, Fleetway and Crusade, cooperating with writers such as Alan Grant, Pat Mills and John Wagner on series like Lobo, Sláine, Judge Dredd, Jaguar God, The Spectre and JLA.

He provided the artwork for one chapter of the graphic novel JLA: Riddle of the Beast (2003).

His work as an interior artist on the Dungeons & Dragons game includes the Eberron Campaign Setting (2004), Dragons Monster Manual III (2004), and Lost Empires of Faerûn (Forgotten Realms) (2005).

Rafa Garrés is also an illustrator and painter. In 2005, he took over the artwork of the Mortepierre series from Muhamed Aoumri at Soleil Productions (scripts by Brice Tarvel).
