= Northwest Institute of Literary Arts =

Education organization in Langley, United States

The Northwest Institute of Literary Arts (NILA) was a non-profit Master of Fine Arts in Creative Writing low-residency program founded by the Whidbey Island Writers Association. It was in operation for twelve years, from 2005 to 2016. Beginning with an enrollment of nine students, the NILA MFA program grew to a peak enrollment of 62 students in 2014. Each semester began with intensive in-person residencies offering morning classes in craft, workshop, and directed reading, and afternoon sessions on the profession of writing. The three hours of afternoon classes were taught by guest faculty. At the end of residency, students returned home to complete the rest of the semester via online class forums.

The NILA MFA program grew quickly, drawing students to Whidbey Island twice annually from across the U.S. and Canada. Due to multiple contributing factors, however, including a proliferation of low residency MFA programs, lower enrollment, and a lack of core funding, the Northwest Institute of Literary Arts Board of Directors made the decision to cease operations of the MFA program at the close of the 2015–2016 school year. On August 13, 2016, twenty graduates received MFA degrees in Creative Writing, adding to the 65 graduates of the previous nine years. NILA students who had not yet completed their creative writing coursework and graduate theses were successfully transferred to other low residency MFA programs.

== History ==
In 2002 the Whidbey Island Writers Association, founded in 1998, voted to pursue founding a low residency MFA program on Whidbey Island. Celeste Mergens was a driving force in fundraising and getting the program off the ground. Wayne Ude, an author and former university professor who had assisted previously in the creation of MFA programs at Old Dominion University and Colorado State University, became the founding Program Director.

In 2004, the Whidbey Island Writers Association received authorization by the State of Washington to found the Whidbey Writers Workshop low residency MFA program, the first in the U.S. to be offered by an organization of writers, and not by a college or university.

Originally established as the Whidbey Writers Workshop, this graduate level, state and federally recognized Master of Fine Arts program held its first semester in August 2005 with an enrollment of nine students. The program offered instruction in four different creative writing genres: children/young adult, fiction, nonfiction, and poetry. As a low residency program, each semester began with intensive writing residencies on Whidbey Island.

In 2007, a first graduating class of eight MFA students received Creative Writing degrees. The program was featured that year as one of nine distinctive programs in Poets & Writers magazine.

In 2009, the Whidbey Writers Workshop came under the auspices of, and was renamed to, the Northwest Institute of Literary Arts. The program received national accreditation in 2010 through the Distance Education and Training Council, now known as the Distance Education Accrediting Commission (DEAC).

By 2011, the Northwest Institute of Literary Arts encompassed the MFA program, the Whidbey Island Writers Association, the Whidbey Island Writers Conference, and Soundings Review literary magazine.

By 2014, the Northwest Institute of Literary Arts MFA program was proving successful, with a full-time enrollment of over 50 students and a graduation rate of 88%. Nine-day residencies were being held in August and January at the Captain Whidbey Inn near Coupeville, Washington. However, ambitious plans for expansion and an increase in staff coupled with lower enrollment led to a negative balance at the close of that fiscal year.

In 2015, the MFA program received renewed accreditation from the DEAC for one year (rather than five), pending evidence of financial stabilization in 2016. On February 29, 2016, the board of directors voted to close the MFA program and negotiated an articulation agreement with Antioch University Los Angeles.

As of the final graduation of twenty students in August 2016, the NILA MFA bestowed a total of 85 Creative Writing degrees. NILA alumni have published over 30 books and 200 essays, articles, and poems in periodical publications.
