= The Binding Stone =

Eberron D&D book

- Cover of the first edition
- Language: English
- Genre: Fantasy novel
- Published: 2005
- Publication place: United States
- Media type: Print (Paperback)
- ISBN: 978-0-7869-3784-4

The Binding Stone is a fantasy novel by Don Bassingthwaite, set in the world of Eberron, and based on the Dungeons & Dragons role-playing game. It is the first novel in "The Dragon Below" series. It was published in paperback in August 2005.

== Plot summary ==
The Binding Stone follows the stories of shifter Geth and human shaman Adolan as they join kalashtar psychic Dandra and Lieutenant Singe.

== Reception ==
Pat Ferrara of mania.com comments: "First of all I gotta say this guy can write and this book was a great introduction to a new series. Don immediately sets up characters that are unique and memorable, so much so that I actually cringed when a favorite persona got killed off (which I haven’t done in a long while). Although you do have your archetypal good and evil forms, the author avoids a common pitfall of fantasy literature by painting characters with a spectrum of moral hues. Not only does this add realism to a lush world but also makes the motivations far more believable and above all leads ample room for character growth. This is evident in Singe and Geth’s haunting back story as well as the addition of a new major player: Ashi. A former foe of the Bonetree clan, Ashi transforms from a stereotypical opponent to a dynamic individual throughout the novel. A great opener."

The Binding Stone was #2 on CBR's 2020 "10 Of The Best DnD Stories To Start Off With" list — the article states that "Not only is The Binding Stone worth a read on its own merits, its great source of inspiration for DMs and players wanting to play in the Eberron setting. Many of the book's main characters highlight the races unique to the setting and the setting's greyer morally. It also introduces the Bonetree clan, a more nuanced take on the barbarian horde."
