= Chris Perkins (game designer) =

Canadian American game designer

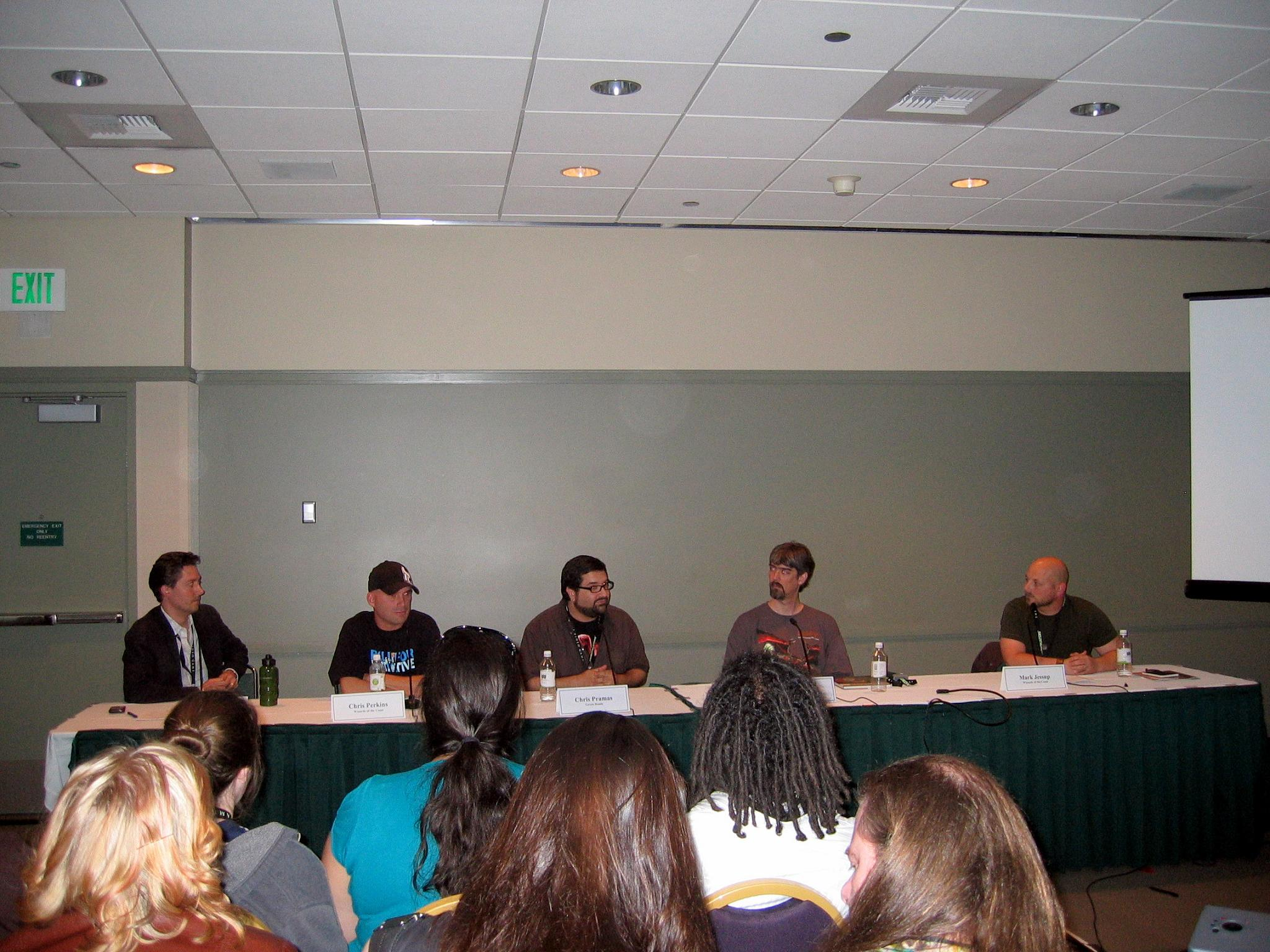
- Perkins at the Penny Arcade Expo in 2008, second from the left
- Born: Christopher Perkins; February 29, 1968 (age 58); Canada
- Other name: Christopher Zarathustra
- Occupation: Game designer
- Years active: 1988–present
- Known for: Story design for Dungeons & Dragons

Christopher Perkins (born February 29, 1968) is a Canadian American game designer and editor who is known for his work on Wizards of the Coast's Dungeons & Dragons role-playing game. He retired from Wizards of the Coast in 2025. He then became the Creative Director of Darrington Press in June 2025.

== Career ==
Under the pen name "Christopher Zarathustra", Perkins got his career start in 1988 writing the adventure "Wards of Witching Ways" for Dungeon magazine #11. He later officially started working for Wizards of the Coast in 1997, beginning as the editor for Dungeon. A few years later, he was promoted to editor-in-chief of Wizards periodicals.

Perkins later became the senior producer for Dungeons & Dragons, leading the team of designers, developers, and editors who make products for the Dungeons & Dragons role-playing game. Perkins was the story manager for Dungeons & Dragons in 2007 before the release of the game's fourth edition. Perkins was working on the Star Wars Saga Edition while Dungeons & Dragons fourth edition was being developed, and ideas were exchanged freely between Perkins and the fourth edition team. He was also on the SCRAMJET team, led by Richard Baker, and including James Wyatt, Matthew Sernett, Ed Stark, Michele Carter, and Stacy Longstreet; this team updated the setting and cosmology of Dungeons & Dragons as the fourth edition was being developed.

Perkins wrote a blog, "The Dungeon Master Experience", on the Wizards of the Coast website for over two years, where he shared tricks and advice about the challenge of "dungeon mastering" a campaign through the lens of his homebrew world, Iomandra. However, in the penultimate posting of March 2013, he announced the following posting would be the last "at least for a while", whereupon the blog became inactive.

Perkins was the Lead Story Designer for the adventure module Curse of Strahd, released in 2016, which added Ravenloft to the 5th edition of Dungeons & Dragons. In 2018, Perkins was the senior story designer for Dungeons & Dragons. In a 2024 interview, he highlighted that as the Game Architect for the Dungeons & Dragons brand his "primary responsibility is to manage the team of designers and editors" who make the tabletop game products along with supporting "other D&D teams as well as business partners". In October 2024, Perkins stated that "although I made substantial contributions to the Monster Manual (2025) and the next D&D starter set, the Dungeon Master's Guide (2024) is the last official D&D book in which I'm credited as a product lead". He later clarified that his position at Wizards of the Coast has shifted from Game Design Architect to Creative Director. In April 2025, Perkins announced his retirement after working for "28 years" at Wizards of the Coast.

In June 2025, it was announced that both Perkins and Jeremy Crawford would be joining Critical Role Productions' tabletop game imprint Darrington Press. Perkins became the company's Creative Director while Crawford became the Game Director which matches their former roles at Wizards of the Coast. Perkins stated, "I was committed to staying with Wizards until after D&D's 50th anniversary, which gave me lots of time to work on succession planning and exit strategies. What brought me out of retirement was the chance to work with Jeremy and the brilliant folks at Critical Role on things that have a lasting, positive impact on the world". In July 2025, Darrington Press announced that Perkins will be creating an "interconnected adventure supplement" for their tabletop role-playing game Daggerheart. In February 2026, Deadline reported that Perkins is a consultant on the in development television series, Baldur's Gate.

=== Actual play ===
Perkins was the longtime Dungeon Master for the Acquisitions Incorporated actual play games at the Penny Arcade Expo (PAX), until PAX Unplugged 2018, when he was succeeded by Jeremy Crawford. The games began in 2008 with the 4th edition of Dungeons & Dragons before switching to the 5th edition following the release of the new edition. Despite no longer at the head of the table, Perkins is still involved with the series and makes occasional appearances. At PAX Unplugged 2025, Acquisitions Incorporated switched to Daggerheart with Crawford continuing as gamemaster.

From 2016 to 2019, Perkins was the Dungeon Master in the Twitch show Dice, Camera, Action, which was a livestream play-through of Dungeons & Dragons' latest story lines. He has also guest starred twice on the Dungeons & Dragons-based show, Critical Role.

== Personal life ==
In his free time, Perkins runs a Dungeons & Dragons campaign set in his homebrew world of Iomandra.
