= Raven Mimura =

Artist

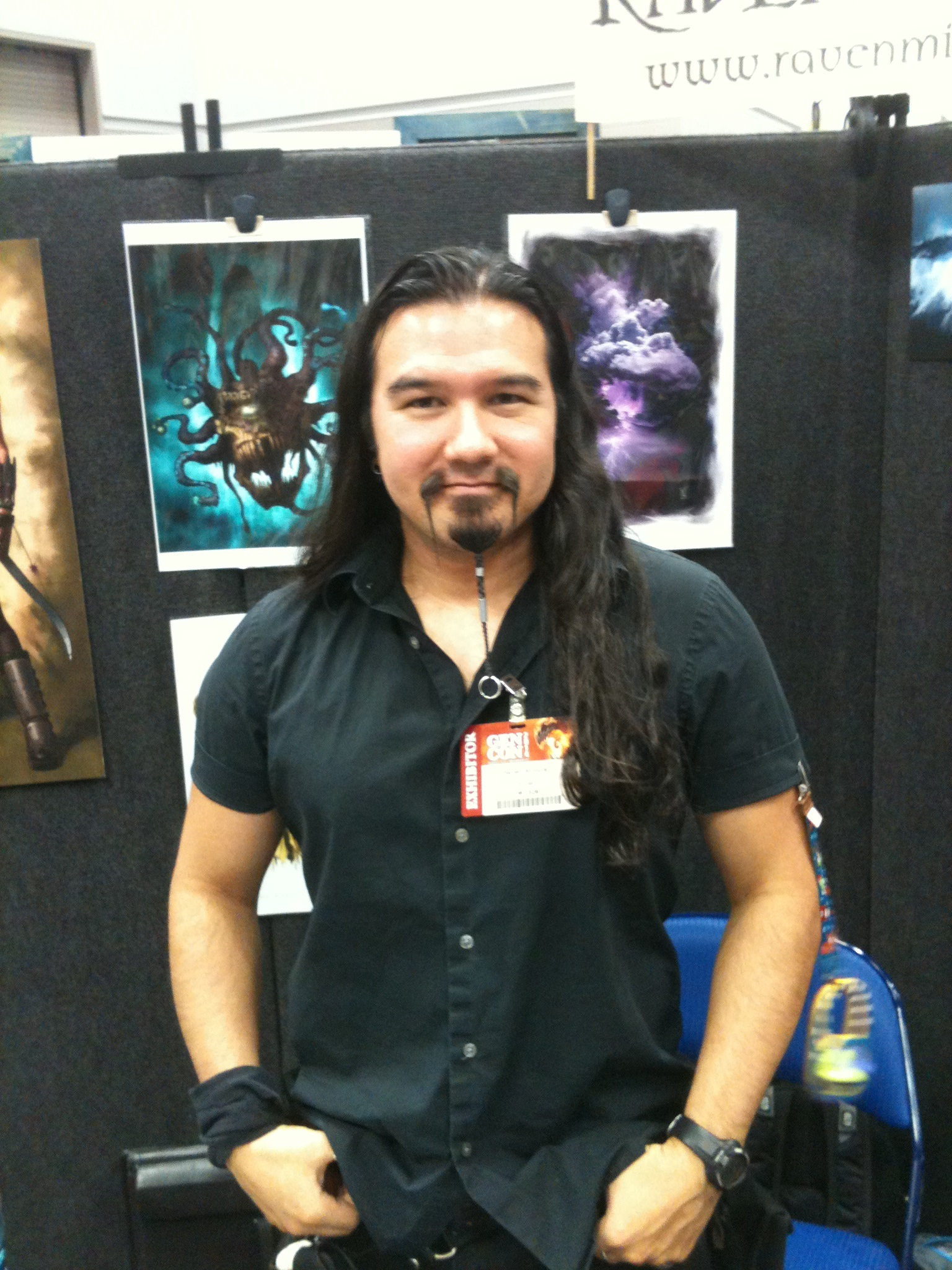
- Known for: Fantasy art

Raven Mimura is an artist whose work has appeared in role-playing games.

== Early life and education ==
Raven received a Bachelor of Fine Arts in Illustration from Rhode Island School of Design. He spent a year teaching art and building his portfolio before starting his freelance career.

== Works ==
Raven Mimura has produced interior illustrations for many Dungeons & Dragons books beginning in 2001, as well as cover art for Oriental Adventures (2001) and Fiendish Codex II: Tyrants of the Nine Hells (2006). He has also produced artwork for other games including 7th Sea (Alderac Entertainment Group), Vampire: The Requiem (White Wolf Publishing), and Hearthstone (Blizzard Entertainment).
