= James Wyatt (game designer) =

American game designer (born c. 1968)

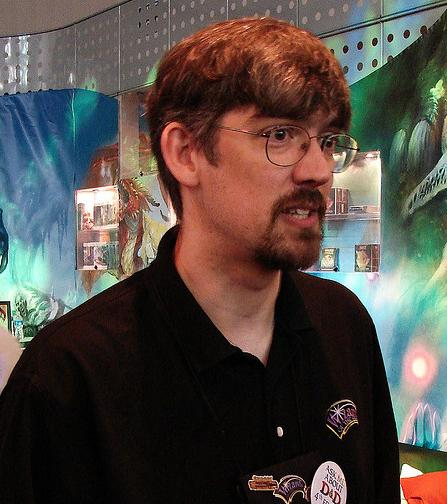
- Wyatt at Gen Con on August 18, 2007
- Born: c. 1968
- Education: Oberlin College; Master of Divinity
- Occupations: Game designer, United Methodist minister, Episcopal Priest
- Writing career
- Genre: Role-playing games

James Wyatt (born c. 1968) is a game designer and former United Methodist minister. He works for Wizards of the Coast, where he has designed supplements and adventures for the Dungeons & Dragons (D&D) roleplaying game. He is the author of sci-fi and fantasy novels, including Forgotten Realms books, and the 4th edition Dungeon Master's Guide.

== Biography ==
Wyatt grew up in Ithaca, New York where he attended Ithaca High School, graduating in 1986. He had been playing role-playing games since the late 1970s, beginning with the first Basic D&D set: "I remember pretending to be a wizard in my backyard before I picked up the basic set... I used the monster statistics in the D&D books to give us wizards something to fight in our primitive backyard live-action roleplaying game." After high-school he attended Oberlin in Ohio as a religion major and graduated in 1990. He went on to receive a Master of Divinity from Union Theological Seminary in New York City, in 1993. He was married soon after. In 1994, Wyatt began his working career as the minister of two small United Methodist churches in southeastern Ohio.

While working as a minister, Wyatt began writing in his spare time for Dragon magazine, starting with material for TSR's Masque of the Red Death setting. By 1996, Wyatt decided to change his career path: "While I was in the ministry, I started submitting adventures to Dungeon magazine... I found that my D&D work was a source of freedom and energy when ministry was more life-draining for me. When I started getting adventures and articles accepted, it was so exciting that it became clear that D&D would never again be just a hobby for me." The same year, he moved to Wisconsin in hopes of getting a full-time job at TSR, which did not immediately work out, but he kept writing material as a freelance author. Wyatt produced work for roleplaying games such as West End's Hercules & Xena Roleplaying Game, although he felt that "D&D has always been my one true love in the gaming world... despite junior high flings with other game systems." He continued to have material published in Dragon and Dungeon.

In 1998, he moved to Berkeley, California, and in 2000 to the Seattle/Tacoma area of Washington state. Wizards of the Coast ultimately hired him in January 2000 to work on the D&D game full-time; his first assignment was Monstrous Compendium: Monsters of Faerûn, of which he wrote two-thirds. His other early works for Wizards of the Coast included The Speaker in Dreams (a core adventure on the original Adventure Path, following The Sunless Citadel and The Forge of Fury), Defenders of the Faith, the monsters chapter in the Forgotten Realms Campaign Setting, and numerous articles in Dragon and Dungeon. Wyatt wrote Oriental Adventures (2001), a setting book that had been in the works with Wizards for more than a year, and which presented new rules for Oriental lands, including specific rules for the Rokugan setting. He wrote City of the Spider Queen and co-authored numerous roleplaying game products, including Magic of Incarnum, Sharn: City of Towers, Draconomicon, The Book of Dragons, and Book of Exalted Deeds. Eberron was introduced with the Eberron Campaign Setting (2004), which was designed by Keith Baker with Wyatt and Bill Slavicsek. Early in 2005, Slavicsek put together a team to start some early designs for a fourth edition of D&D, which was headed by Rob Heinsoo with Collins and Wyatt as the core fourth-edition team. Wyatt was on the SCRAMJET team, led by Richard Baker, along with Matt Sernett, Ed Stark, Michele Carter, Stacy Longstreet, and Chris Perkins; this team updated the setting and cosmology of D&D as the fourth edition was being developed.

He wrote the D&D novels In the Claws of the Tiger (2006), Storm Dragon (2007), Dragon Forge (2008), Dragon War (2009), and Oath of Vigilance (2011).

In 2014, Wyatt left Dungeons & Dragons to work on the writing and creative aspects of Magic: The Gathering. Wyatt wrote the text for the series of Art of Magic: The Gathering coffee table books, which reprint illustrations from the cards with details for each plane's lore. He then wrote a series of free PDF releases called Plane Shift which adapts Magic: The Gathering for Dungeons & Dragons; the Plane Shift releases were created to allow players to use those coffee table books as campaign setting guides by providing the necessary rule adaptations. Between 2016 and 2018, six "Plane Shift" articles were released: Amonkhet, Dominaria, Innistrad, Ixalan, Kaladesh, and Zendikar, along with an Ixalan-set adventure. However, these articles are not considered official material for organized play. In 2017, Mike Mearls wrote: "It's basically a thing James does for fun, and we don't want to burden it with needing all the work required to make it official".

The positive response to the "Plane Shift" articles lead to the 2018 publication of Guildmasters' Guide to Ravnica, a full hardcover setting guide to the Magic setting of Ravnica for Dungeons & Dragons. Wyatt was the lead designer on Guildmasters’ Guide to Ravnica (2018) and he stated "this book is, essentially, Plane Shift: Ravnica". Wyatt and F. Wesley Schneider were then co-leads on the design on the next crossover book Mythic Odysseys of Theros (2020) which adapts the Magic setting of Theros. He is also one of the authors of the sourcebook Van Richten's Guide to Ravenloft (2021).

Wyatt is also a Priest in the Episcopal Church as of June 14, 2025, and serves as Vicar of Faith Episcopal Poulsbo.

== Honors ==
Wyatt received Origins Awards in 2003 for City of the Spider Queen and in 2005 for the Eberron Campaign Setting, which he co-authored with Bill Slavicsek and Keith Baker. His other notable works include Oriental Adventures (for which he won an ENnie Award in 2002), Draconomicon, the The Draconic Prophecies series, and Magic of Incarnum.
