= List of Advanced Dungeons & Dragons 1st edition monsters =

This is the Index of Advanced Dungeons & Dragons 1st edition monsters, an important element of that role-playing game. This list only includes monsters from official Advanced Dungeons & Dragons 1st Edition supplements published by TSR, Inc. or Wizards of the Coast, not licensed or unlicensed third-party products such as video games or unlicensed Advanced Dungeons & Dragons 1st Edition manuals.

== Monsters in the 1st edition of Advanced Dungeons & Dragons ==
Encyclopedic cataloguing of monsters dates back to ancient times, for example Pliny's Natural History. However, 1st edition Advanced Dungeons & Dragons was the first game to simulate monsters and magic. The "spread sheeting" of monsters in 1st edition was hugely influential not only for tabletop gaming, but computer games as well. Writing at the time of the 1st edition of Advanced Dungeons & Dragons, Ian Livingstone concluded in a comparison between contemporary role-playing games: "No other RPG has such a wide range of monsters, each clearly explained, as AD&D", from "humanoid creatures (ogres, goblins, etc.), and dragons and reptiles, right through to exotic and strange creatures." Chroniclers of the art of Dungeons & Dragons Michael Witwer et al. observed that the regular inclusion of images introduced in this edition "made the standard visualisation of monsters just as important as how they were specified and quantified". A.V. Club reviewer Nick Wanserski commented in 2016 on the depiction of monsters in this phase of the game that "pen and ink interior illustrations found in books like the original Fiend Folio [...] weren't nearly as polished as the contemporary art, but had an earnest strangeness that I tend to get sentimental about."

== TSR 2009 – Monster Manual (1977) ==
This was the initial monster book for the first edition of the Advanced Dungeons & Dragons game, published in 1977. Gary Gygax wrote much of the work himself, having included and expanded most of the monsters from the previous D&D supplements. Also included are monsters originally printed in The Strategic Review, as well as some originally found in early issues of The Dragon (such as the anhkheg and remorhaz), and other early game materials. This book also expanded on the original monster format, such as including the stat lines on the same page as the monsters' descriptions and introducing more stats, expanding the length of most monster descriptions, and featuring illustrations for most of the monsters, which "became the canonical representations of these fantastic creatures" for a significant period of D&D and an important influence on other games. The book features an alphabetical table of contents of all the monsters on pages 3–4, explanatory notes for the statistics lines on pages 5–6, descriptions of the monsters on pages 6–103, a treasure chart on page 105, and an index of major listings on pages 106–109.

While later editions gave monsters attributes similar to player characters, the 1st and 2nd editions listed intelligence only, as a characteristic important for creating challenging encounters in the game.

ISBN 0-935696-00-8

Creature	Other Appearances	Variants	Description
Aerial servant	D&D Companion Rules (1984), MC1 – Monstrous Compendium Volume One (1989), Dungeons & Dragons Rules Cyclopedia (1991), Monstrous Manual (1993)		Semi-intelligent form of air elemental typically conjured by a cleric
Ankheg	Dragon #5 (1977), Dragon #117 "The Ecology of the Anhkheg" (1987), MC2 – Monstrous Compendium Volume Two (1989), Monstrous Manual (1993), Monster Manual (2000), Monster Manual v.3.5 (2003), D&D Miniatures: Underdark #30 (2005), Monster Manual v.5 (2014), Monster Manual v.5.5 (2025)		A chitinous creature that burrows through the earth like an earthworm
Ant, giant	D&D Basic Set (1977, 1981, 1983), MC2 – Monstrous Compendium Volume Two (1989), Dungeons & Dragons Rules Cyclopedia (1991), Monstrous Manual (1993), Monster Manual (2000), Monster Manual v.3.5 (2003)		
Ape	Dragon #133 "The Ecology of the Carnivorous Ape" (1988), MC2 – Monstrous Compendium Volume Two (1989), Monstrous Manual (1993)	gorilla and carnivorous ape	
Axe beak	MC3 – Monstrous Compendium Volume Three: Forgotten Realms Appendix (1989), Monstrous Compendium Annual Volume Two (1995), Arms and Equipment Guide (2003), Monster Manual v.5 (2014), Monster Manual v.5.5 (2025) (normal, giant)	normal, giant	Prehistoric carnivorous flightless birds, very fast runners that hunt aggressively
Baboon	MC2 – Monstrous Compendium Volume Two (1989), Monstrous Manual (1993), Monster Manual (2000), Monster Manual v.3.5 (2003)		
Badger	MC2 – Monstrous Compendium Volume Two (1989), Monstrous Manual (1993), Monster Manual (2000), Monster Manual v.3.5 (2003)		
Baluchitherium	MC3 – Monstrous Compendium Volume Three: Forgotten Realms Appendix (1989), DMR2 – Creature Catalog (1993), Monstrous Compendium Annual Volume Two (1995), Fiend Folio (2003) (as "Indricothere")		Prehistoric ancestor of the rhinoceros, a huge herbivore
Barracuda	MC2 – Monstrous Compendium Volume Two (1989), Monstrous Manual (1993), Stormwrack (2005)		
Basilisk	Dungeons & Dragons set (1974), D&D Basic Set (1977), D&D Expert Set (1981, 1983), Dragon #81 "The Ecology of the Basilisk" (1984), D&D Companion Rules (1984), MC2 – Monstrous Compendium Volume Two (1989), Dungeons & Dragons Rules Cyclopedia (1991), Monstrous Manual (1993), Monster Manual (2000), Monster Manual v.3.5 (2003), D&D Miniatures: Giants of Legend set #13 (2004), Monster Manual v.5 (2014), Monster Manual v.5.5 (2025)		Reptilian monster whose gaze can turn creatures to stone. AD&D's basilisk was also adapted into the Magic: The Gathering trading card game, with a depiction taken from the Monster Manual being used in a prototype version.
Bear	D&D Basic Set (1981, 1983), MC1 – Monstrous Compendium Volume One (1989), Dungeons & Dragons Rules Cyclopedia (1991), Monstrous Manual (1993), Monster Manual (2000), Monster Manual v.3.5 (2003), Monster Manual v.5 (2014), Monster Manual v.5.5 (2025)	black, brown, and cave bear	
Beaver, giant	Blackmoor set (1975), Monstrous Compendium Annual Volume Two (1989)		
Beetle, giant	Blackmoor set (1975), D&D Basic Set (1977, 1981, 1983) (fire), MC2 – Monstrous Compendium Volume Two (1989), Dungeons & Dragons Rules Cyclopedia (1991) (fire), Monstrous Manual (1993), Monster Manual (2000) (bombardier, fire, stag), Monster Manual v.3.5 (2003) (bombardier, fire, stag), D&D Miniatures: Blood War set (2006) (celestial giant stag beetle), Monster Manual v.5 (2014) (fire), Monster Manual v.5.5 (2025) (fire)	bombardier, boring, fire, rhinoceros, stag, and water	
Beholder	Greyhawk set (1974), Dragon #76 "The Ecology of the Beholder" (1983), D&D Companion Rules (1984), MC1 – Monstrous Compendium Volume One (1989), Dungeons & Dragons Rules Cyclopedia (1991), Monstrous Manual (1993), I, Tyrant (1996), Monster Manual (2000), Monster Manual v.3.5 (2003), D&D Miniatures: Deathknell set #32 (2005) Monster Manual v.5 (2014), Monster Manual (2025)		Hateful, aggressive, avaricious spherical monster that is most frequently found underground. A "creature that looks at you and is destroying you by the power of its magical eyes". A terrible beast, but depicted as "a cuddly rosy ball with too many eyes". Designed to counter magic-using characters while being a formidable opponent for a whole party due to its versatility. Considered one of "the game's signature monsters" by Philip J. Clements. A "classic", "iconic", as well as "one of the most feared and fearsome monsters of the game", present through all editions.
Black pudding	Dungeons & Dragons set (1974), D&D Basic Set (1977), D&D Expert Set (1981, 1983), MC1 – Monstrous Compendium Volume One (1989), Dungeons & Dragons Rules Cyclopedia (1991), Monstrous Manual (1993), Dragon #219 "The Ecology of the Black Pudding" (1995), Monster Manual (2000), Monster Manual v.3.5 (2003)		A scavengers that can flow through narrow openings and lives underground
Blink dog	Greyhawk set (1974), D&D Basic Set (1977), D&D Expert Set (1981, 1983), MC1 – Monstrous Compendium Volume One (1989), Dungeons & Dragons Rules Cyclopedia (1991), Monstrous Manual (1993), Monster Manual (2000), Monster Manual v.3.5 (2003), Monster Manual v.5 (2014), Monster Manual v.5.5 (2025)		Lawful good creatures as intelligent as normal humans, with a limited form of teleportation
Boar	D&D Basic Set (1981, 1983), MC1 – Monstrous Compendium Volume One (1989), Dungeons & Dragons Rules Cyclopedia (1991), Monstrous Manual (1993), Monstrous Compendium Annual Volume Two (1995), Monster Manual (2000), Monster Manual v.3.5 (2003), Monster Manual v.5 (2014) (wild, giant)	wild, giant, and warthog	
Brain mole	Eldritch Wizardry, PHBR5 – Complete Psionics Handbook (1991), Monstrous Manual (1993), Psionics Handbook (2001), Expanded Psionics Handbook (2004)		Small mole-like mammals that can psionically "burrow" into another creature's mind
Brownie	MC1 – Monstrous Compendium Volume One (1989), DMR2 – Creature Catalog (1993), Monstrous Manual (1993), Dangerous Denizens: The Monsters of Tellene (2003)		Distant relatives of halflings that dwell in quiet, pastoral areas. The brownie was written up as a player character race in White Dwarf #29 (Feb. 1982) for AD&D 1st Edition by Bob Lock in 1982.
Buffalo	MC1 – Monstrous Compendium Volume One (1989), Monstrous Manual (1993), Monster Manual (2000) (as "bison"), Monster Manual v.3.5 (2003) (as "bison")		
Bugbear	Greyhawk set (1974), D&D Basic Set (1977, 1981, 1983), MC1 – Monstrous Compendium Volume One (1989), Dungeons & Dragons Rules Cyclopedia (1991), Monstrous Manual (1993), Monster Manual (2000), Monster Manual v.3.5 (2003), D&D Miniatures: Dragoneye set #46 (2004)		Larger cousins of goblins, for the most part presented as inherently evil before the 5th edition of the game,
Bulette	Dragon #1 (1976), Dragon #74 "The Ecology of the Bulette" (1983), MC2 – Monstrous Compendium Volume Two (1989), Monstrous Manual (1993), Monster Manual (2000), Monster Manual v.3.5 (2003), D&D Miniatures: Giants of Legend set #67 (2004), Monster Manual v.5 (2014), Monster Manual v.5.5 (2025) (joung, normal)	joung	Landshark burrows underground and feeds on humans, horses, and halflings. Also called land shark, inspired by a plastic toy from Hong Kong. In his 2019 book The Monsters Know What They're Doing, author Keith Ammann called bulettes "brutes tailor-made to give your players jump scares" and found its preferences and aversions for the meat of different humanoid races "ludicrous".
Bull	Monstrous Compendium Annual Volume Two (1995), Dangerous Denizens: The Monsters of Tellene (2003)		
Camel, wild	D&D Expert Set (1981, 1983), MC1 – Monstrous Compendium Volume One (1989), Dungeons & Dragons Rules Cyclopedia (1991), MC13 – Monstrous Compendium Al-Qadim Appendix (1992), Monstrous Manual (1993), Monster Manual (2000), Monster Manual v.3.5 (2003)		
Carrion crawler	Greyhawk set (1974)D&D Basic Set (1977, 1981, 1983), MC1 – Monstrous Compendium Volume One (1989), Dungeons & Dragons Rules Cyclopedia (1991), Monstrous Manual (1993), Dragon #267 "The Ecology of the Carrion Crawler: Crawlspaces" (2000), Monster Manual (2000), Monster Manual v.3.5 (2003), D&D Miniatures: Dragoneye set #41 (2004)		Worm-like cephalopod that scavenges in subterranean areas
Catoblepas	Strategic Review #7 (1976), Dragon #73 "The Ecology of the Catoblepas" (1983), D&D Master Rules (1985) (as "Nekrozon"), MC1 – Monstrous Compendium Volume One (1989), Dungeons & Dragons Rules Cyclopedia (1991) (as "Nekrozon"), Monstrous Manual (1993), Monster Manual II (2002), Mordenkainen presents Monsters of the Multiverse (2021)		Loathsome creature whose gaze causes death. David M. Ewalt described it as "an overweight buffalo with stumpy legs, a giraffe-like neck, and a warthog's head". An "old personal favorite" of reviewer Mark Theurer. Black Gate editor Howard Andrew Jones remarked on their presence throughout the game's history.
Cattle, wild	MC1 – Monstrous Compendium Volume One (1989), Dungeons & Dragons Rules Cyclopedia (1991), Monstrous Manual (1993)		
Centaur	Dungeons & Dragons set (1974), D&D Expert Set (1981, 1983), MC1 – Monstrous Compendium Volume One (1989), Dungeons & Dragons Rules Cyclopedia (1991), Monstrous Manual (1993), Monster Manual (2000), Monster Manual v.3.5 (2003), D&D Miniatures: Harbinger set #17 (2003) Monster Manual v.5 (2014), (playable in) Mordenkainen presents Monsters of the Multiverse v.5 (2021), Monster Manual v.5.5 (2025)		Dwells in secluded pastures far from human habitation. Based on the creature from Greek mythology.
Centipede, giant	D&D Basic Set (1977, 1981, 1983), MC1 – Monstrous Compendium Volume One (1989), Dungeons & Dragons Rules Cyclopedia (1991), Monstrous Manual (1993), Monster Manual (2000) (as "Monstrous Centipede"), Monster Manual v.3.5 (2003) (as "Monstrous Centipede")		Giant centipedes are "low-level monsters", one-foot long red many-legged creatures.
Cerebral parasite	Eldritch Wizardry, PHBR5 – Complete Psionics Handbook (1991), Expanded Psionics Handbook (2004)		Tiny creatures that drain psionic abilities
Chimera	Dungeons & Dragons set (1974), D&D Basic Set (1977), D&D Expert Set (1981, 1983), Dragon #94 "The Ecology of the Chimera" (1985), MC1 – Monstrous Compendium Volume One (1989), Dungeons & Dragons Rules Cyclopedia (1991), Monstrous Manual (1993), Monster Manual (2000), Monster Manual v.3.5 (2003), D&D Miniatures: War Drums set #45 (2006), Monster Manual v.5 (2014), Monster Manual v.5.5 (2025)		Three-headed creature can bite with its lion head, gore with its goat head, and breathe fire with its dragon head. The chimera is based on the chimera of Greek mythology as found in the Iliad by Homer, "stronger than a centaur but weaker than a sphinx". Present in the game since the earliest edition.
Cockatrice	Dungeons & Dragons set (1974), D&D Basic Set (1977), D&D Expert Set (1981, 1983), D&D Companion Rules (1984), Dragon #95 "The Ecology of the Cockatrice" (1985), MC1 – Monstrous Compendium Volume One (1989), Dungeons & Dragons Rules Cyclopedia (1991), Monstrous Manual (1993), Monster Manual (2001), Monster Manual v.3.5 (2003)		Rooster-like creature whose touch turns flesh to stone. Based on the creature from medieval bestiaries.
Couatl	Eldritch Wizardry, MC1 – Monstrous Compendium Volume One (1989), Monstrous Manual (1993), Monster Manual (2000), Monster Manual v.3.5 (2003), D&D Miniatures: Deathknell set #2 (2005), Monster Manual v.5 (2014), Monster Manual v.5.5 (2025)		Winged, feathered serpents with great intelligence and powers. Based on the creature from Mesoamerican religion.
Crab, giant	Blackmoor set (1975), D&D Expert Set (1981, 1983), MC2 – Monstrous Compendium Volume Two (1989), Dungeons & Dragons Rules Cyclopedia (1991), Monstrous Manual (1993), Stormwrack (2005) (as "Monstrous Crab"), Monster Manual v.5 (2014), Monster Manual v.5.5 (2025)		
Crayfish, giant	MC2 – Monstrous Compendium Volume Two (1989), Monstrous Manual (1993), Dragon #321 (2004)		
Crocodile	Blackmoor set (1975) (giant crocodile), D&D Expert Set (1981, 1983), MC2 – Monstrous Compendium Volume Two (1989), Dungeons & Dragons Rules Cyclopedia (1991), Monstrous Manual (1993), Monster Manual (2000), Monster Manual v.3.5 (2003), Monster Manual v.5 (2014), Monster Manual v.5.5 (2025)	normal and giant	
Demon			Renamed to tanar'ri in 2nd Edition in response to moral panic, many were based on figures from Christian demonology. Considered among the "standard repertoire of "Monsters"" by Fabian Perlini-Pfister. In a review of Planescape Monstrous Compendium Appendix II for Arcane magazine, the reviewer cites the culture of the tanar'ri as helping "give the Planes a solid base of peoples".
-- Demogorgon (Prince of Demons)	Eldritch Wizardry, D&D Immortal Rules (1986), Book of Vile Darkness (2002), Miniatures Handbook (2003) (aspect), D&D Miniatures: Archfiends set #45 (2004) (aspect), Fiendish Codex I (2006), Dragon #357 (2007), Dungeon #150 (2007), Mordenkainen presents Monsters of the Multiverse v.5 (2021)		In Dungeons & Dragons, Demogorgon is a powerful demon prince. He is known as the Prince of Demons, a self-proclaimed title, but one that is acknowledged by mortals and even his fellow demons because of his power and influence. Demogorgon was also named an "iconic D&D character" by Witwer et al. and one of the greatest villains in D&D history by the final print issue of Dragon. He is depicted as an eighteen foot tall, reptilian (or amphibious) hermaphroditic tanar'ri (a type of demon) with a somewhat humanoid form (His torso is depicted as ape-like in accompanying art). Two mandrill or hyena heads sprout from his twin snake-like necks, and his arms end in long tentacles. His two heads have individual minds and names. In his research into the inspirational sources of the game, Aardy R. DeVarque observed that while this character is based on the evil deity of legend and literature, "the actual description used in D&D is apparently Gygax's creation." Demogorgon first appeared in the original edition of Dungeons & Dragons, in Eldritch Wizardry (1976), and has appeared in every subsequent edition of the game. Already in 1976 miniatures of Demogorgon were produced by Minifigs based on "Gygax's specifications and Dave Sutherland's illustration from Eldritch Wizardry." Demogorgon is the name given to the otherworldly creature which appeared in the Netflix original show Stranger Things, derived from the Dungeons & Dragons creature.
-- Juiblex (The Faceless Lord)	Book of Vile Darkness (2002), Fiendish Codex I (2006), Mordenkainen presents Monsters of the Multiverse v.5 (2021)		
-- Manes (Sub-Demon)	MC8 – Monstrous Compendium Outer Planes Appendix (1991), Planescape Monstrous Compendium Appendix (1994), Book of Vile Darkness (2002), Fiendish Codex I (2006), Monster Manual v.5 (2014), Monster Manual v.5.5 (2025)		Dead which go to the layers of the Abyss become manes
-- Orcus (Prince of the Undead)	Eldritch Wizardry, D&D Immortal Rules (1986), H4 – Throne of Bloodstone (1988), Dungeon #89 (2001), Book of Vile Darkness (2002), Miniatures Handbook (2003) (aspect), D&D Miniatures: Archfiends set #47 (2004) (aspect), Fiendish Codex I (2006), Dungeon #149 (2007), Mordenkainen presents Monsters of the Multiverse v.5 (2021)		Inspired by its real-world mythological counterpart.
-- Succubus	Eldritch Wizardry, D&D Immortal Rules (1986) (as "Demon, Whispering"), MC 8 – Monstrous Compendium Outer Planes Appendix (1991), Wrath of the Immortals (1992) (as "Fiend, Lesser, Whispering"), Planescape Monstrous Compendium Appendix (1994), Monster Manual (2000), Monster Manual v.3.5 (2003), D&D Miniatures: Blood War set #59 (2006), Monster Manual v.5 (2014), Monster Manual v.5.5 (2025)		Female demons whose kiss drains energy levels. Typical example of a demon, belonging to the "standard repertoire of "Monsters"", and one of those contributing to the moral panic; also an instance of the sexist tropes the game draws on which presented female sexuality as inherently dangerous. Rob Bricken of io9 identified the succubus as one of "The 12 Most Obnoxious Dungeons & Dragons Monsters".
-- Type I (Vrock)	Eldritch Wizardry, D&D Immortal Rules (1986) (as "Demon, Screaming"), MC 8 – Monstrous Compendium Outer Planes Appendix (1991), Wrath of the Immortals (1992) (as "Fiend, Lesser, Screaming"), Planescape Monstrous Compendium Appendix (1994), Monster Manual (2000), Monster Manual v.3.5 (2000), D&D Miniatures: Archfiends set #58 (2004), Monster Manual v.5 (2014), Monster Manual v.5.5 (2025)		Resembles a cross between a human and a vulture
-- Type II (Hezrou)	Eldritch Wizardry, D&D Immortal Rules (1986) (as "Demon, Croaking"), MC 8 – Monstrous Compendium Outer Planes Appendix (1991), Wrath of the Immortals (1992) (as "Fiend, Lesser, Croaking"), Planescape Monstrous Compendium Appendix (1994), Monster Manual (2000), Monster Manual v.3.5 (2003), D&D Miniatures: Angelfire set #55 (2005), Monster Manual v.5 (2014), Monster Manual v.5.5 (2025)		Looks somewhat like a gross toad with arms in place of forelegs
-- Type III (Glabrezu)	Eldritch Wizardry, D&D Immortal Rules (1986) (as "Demon, Howling"), MC8 – Monstrous Compendium Outer Planes Appendix (1991), Wrath of the Immortals (1992) (as "Fiend, Lesser, Howling"), Planescape Monstrous Compendium Appendix (1994), Monster Manual (2000), Monster Manual v.3.5 (2003), D&D Miniatures: Giants of Legend set (2004), Monster Manual v.5 (2014), Monster Manual v.5.5 (2025)		9-foot-tall (2.7 m) demon with a ghastly appearance
-- Type IV (Nalfeshnee, etc.)	Eldritch Wizardry, D&D Immortal Rules (1986) (as "Demon, Groaning"), H4 – Throne of Bloodstone (1988), MC8 – Monstrous Compendium Outer Planes Appendix (1991), Wrath of the Immortals (1992) (as "Fiend, Lesser, Groaning"), Planescape Monstrous Compendium Appendix (1994), Monster Manual (2000), Monster Manual v.3.5 (2003), Monster Manual v.5 (2014), Monster Manual v.5.5 (2025)		Demons that combine the worst features of an ape and a boar
-- Type V (Marilith, etc.)	Eldritch Wizardry, D&D Immortal Rules (1986) (as "Demon, Hissing"), MC8 – Monstrous Compendium Outer Planes Appendix (1991), Wrath of the Immortals (1992) (as "Fiend, Lesser, Hissing"), Monstrous Manual (1993), Planescape Monstrous Compendium Appendix (1994), Monster Manual (2000), Monster Manual v.3.5 (2003), D&D Miniatures: Blood War set #55 (2006), Monster Manual v.5 (2014), Monster Manual v.5.5 (2025)		Female demons with a multi-armed torso atop the body of a great snake
-- Type VI (Balor, etc.)	Eldritch Wizardry, D&D Immortal Rules (1986) (as "Demon, Roaring"), MC8 – Monstrous Compendium Outer Planes Appendix (1991), Wrath of the Immortals (1992) (as "Fiend, Lesser, Roaring"), Monstrous Manual (1993), Planescape Monstrous Compendium Appendix (1994), Monster Manual (2000), Monster Manual v.3.5 (2003), D&D Miniatures: Underdark set #41 (2005), Monster Manual v.5 (2014), Monster Manual v.5.5 (2025)		Featuring a highly-muscled man-like body and bat wings, Aardy R. DeVarque compared its depiction "to the demon in the "Night on Bald Mountain" segment of Disney's Fantasia." This demon's favored weapon is a large sword and a whip with many "tails", which is employed to drag an opponent into the flames which the demons are able to create around themselves. Based on and renamed from the Balrog from J.R.R. Tolkien's legendarium, also called type VI demon due to copyright reasons.
-- Yeenoghu (Demon Lord of Gnolls)	Book of Vile Darkness (2002), Fiendish Codex I (2006) (aspect), Expedition to the Demonweb Pits (2007) (aspect), Mordenkainen presents Monsters of the Multiverse v.5 (2021)		
Devil			Don Turnbull considered the devils the most prominent among the new monsters introduced in the Monster Manual: "they are all pretty strong and compare not unfavourably in this respect with the Demons we already know". They were renamed to baatezu in 2nd Edition in response to moral panic. Many were based on figures from Christian demonology.
-- Asmodeus (Arch-devil)	Book of Vile Darkness (2002), Miniatures Handbook (2003) (aspect), Fiendish Codex II (2006) (aspect)		
-- Baalzebul (Arch-devil)	Book of Vile Darkness (2002), Fiendish Codex II (2006) (aspect)		
-- Barbed (Lesser devil)	MC8 – Monstrous Compendium Outer Planes Appendix (1991) (as "Hamatula"), Planescape Monstrous Compendium Appendix (1994) (as "Hamatula"), Monster Manual (2000) (as "Hamatula"), Monster Manual v.3.5 (2003), D&D Miniatures: Angelfire set #35 (2005)		Excellent guards, with horny, barbed hands and horrid tails
-- Bone (Lesser devil)	MC8 – Monstrous Compendium Outer Planes Appendix (1991) (as "Osyluth"), Planescape Monstrous Compendium Appendix (1994) (as "Osyluth"), Monster Manual (2000) (as "Osyluth"), Monster Manual v.3.5 (2003), D&D Miniatures: Archfiends set #29 (2004), D&D Miniatures: Desert of Desolation #31 (2007) (as "Osyluth")		Particularly malicious devils that have a great bone hook they employ to snare and wound opponents
-- Dispater (Arch-devil)	Book of Vile Darkness (2002), Fiendish Codex II (2006) (aspect)		
-- Erinyes (Lesser devil)	MC8 – Monstrous Compendium Outer Planes Appendix (1991), Planescape Monstrous Compendium Appendix (1994), Monster Manual (2000), Monster Manual v.3.5 (2003), D&D Miniatures: Archfiends set #33 (2004), Monster Manual v.5 (2014), Monster Manual v.5.5 (2025)		Female devils that are commonly sent forth to garner more souls. Based on the figures from Greek mythology, with the image in the Monster Manual likely inspired by the appearance of the harpies from the Jason and the Argonauts film.
-- Geryon (Arch-devil)	Yet More Archfiends (Book of Vile Darkness Web Enhancement) (2002), Mordenkainen presents Monsters of the Multiverse v.5 (2021)		
-- Horned (Malebranche) (Greater devil)	MC8 – Monstrous Compendium Outer Planes Appendix (1991) (as "Cornugon"), FRQ2 – Hordes of Dragonspear (1992) (as "Cornugon"), Planescape Monstrous Compendium Appendix (1994) (as "Cornugon"), Monster Manual (2000) (as "Cornugon"), Monster Manual v.3.5 (2003), D&D Miniatures: Blood War set #34 (2006)		Hate anything stronger than themselves, and carry a two-tined fork or a barbed whip
-- Ice (Greater devil)	MC8 – Monstrous Compendium Outer Planes Appendix (1991) (as "Gelugon"), Planescape Monstrous Compendium Appendix (1994) (as "Gelugon"), Monster Manual (2000) (as "Gelugon"), Monster Manual v.3.5 (2003), D&D Miniatures: Blood War set #35 (2006)		Greater devils that attack and torment victims with their claws, mandibles, and tails
-- Lemure	MC8 – Monstrous Compendium Outer Planes Appendix (1991), Planescape Monstrous Compendium Appendix (1994), Monster Manual (2000) Monster Manual v.3.5 (2003), D&D Miniatures: Giants of Legend set #34 (2004), Monster Manual v.5 (2014), Monster Manual v.5.5 (2025),		The form in which the dead which inhabit the Nine Hells are put in. Screen Rant reviewer Scott Baird ranked them among the weakest monsters in the game.
-- Pit Fiend (Greater devil)	MC8 – Monstrous Compendium Outer Planes Appendix (1991), FRQ2 – Hordes of Dragonspear (1992), Monstrous Manual (1993), Planescape Monstrous Compendium Appendix (1994), Monster Manual (2000), Monster Manual v.3.5 (2003), D&D Miniatures: Blood War set #42 (2006), Mordenkainen presents Monsters of the Multiverse v.5 (2021)		Devils of great power that possess a terrible strength and the most evil nature
Dinosaur	Blackmoor set (1975) (elasmosaurus, mosasaurus, plesiosaurus), X1 – Isle of Dread (1980), D&D Expert Set (1981), Dragon #55 (1981), D&D Expert Set (1983), Monster Manual II (1983), D&D Master Rules (1985), Dragon #112 (1986), AC9 – Creature Catalogue (1986), MC3 – Monstrous Compendium Volume Three: Forgotten Realms Appendix (1989), Hollow World Boxed Set (1990), HWR1 – Sons of Azca (1991), Dungeons & Dragons Rules Cyclopedia (1991), Dragon #187 (1992), DMR2 – Creature Catalog (1993), Monstrous Manual (1993), Dungeon #54 (1995), Monstrous Compendium Annual Volume Two (1995), Lands of Intrigue (1997), Monster Manual (2000), Monster Manual II (2002), Monster Manual v.3.5 (2003), Dragon #318 (2004), Eberron Campaign Setting (2004), Serpent Kingdoms (2004), Monster Manual III (2004), Sandstorm (2005), Stormwrack (2005), Dungeon #145 (2007)	anatosaurus (trachodon), akylosaurus, antrodemus (allosaurus), apatosaurus (brontosaurus), archelon ischyras, brachiosaurus, camarasaurus, ceratosaurus, cetiosaurus, dinichtys, diplodocus, elasmosaurus, gorgosaurus, iguanadon, lambeosaurus, megalosaurus, monoclonius, mososaurus, paleoscincus, pentaceratops, plateosaurus, plesiosaurus, pteranadon, stegosaurus, styracosaurus, teratosaurus, triceratops, and tyrannosaurus rex	
Displacer beast	Voyage of the Space Beagle by A. E. van Vogt (1950) (the creature Coeurl was the inspiration for the Displacer Beast), Greyhawk set (1974), D&D Basic Set (1977), D&D Expert Set (1981, 1983), Dragon #109 "The Ecology of the Displacer Beast" (1986), MC 1 – Monstrous Compendium Volume One (1989), Dungeons & Dragons Rules Cyclopedia (1991), Monstrous Manual (1993), Monster Manual (2000), Monster Manual v.3.5 (2003) (also includes a Pack Lord), D&D Miniatures: Harbinger set #41 (2003), D&D Miniatures: War of the Dragon Queen set #29 (2006) (Displacer Beast Pack Lord), D&D Miniatures: Unhallowed set #37 (2007) (Displacer Beast Manhunter), Monster Manual v.5 (2014), Monster Manual v.5.5 (2025)		Vaguely puma-like beast always appears to be three feet away from its actual position. Based on the alien Coeurl from the short story Black Destroyer by A. E. van Vogt. David M. Ewalt, in his book Of Dice and Men, discussed several monsters appearing in the original Monster Manual, describing displacer beasts as looking like "pumas with thorn-covered tentacles growing out of their shoulders". Rob Bricken from io9 named the displacer beast as the 2nd most memorable D&D monster.
Djinni	Dungeons & Dragons set (1974), D&D Basic Set (1977), D&D Expert Set (1981, 1983), D&D Companion Rules (1984), MC1 – Monstrous Compendium Volume One (1989), Dungeons & Dragons Rules Cyclopedia (1991), Land of Fate (1992), Monstrous Manual (1993), Monster Manual (2000), Monster Manual v.3.5 (2003), D&D Miniatures: Angelfire set #17 (2005), Monster Manual v.5 (2014), Monster Manual v.5.5 (2025)		Chaotic good creatures from the aerial plane with magical properties. The djinn and efreet have namesakes from Arabic folklore also associated with air and fire, respectively.
Dog	AC9 – Creature Catalogue (1986), MC1 – Monstrous Compendium Volume One (1989), DMR2 – Creature Catalog (1993), Monstrous Manual (1993), Monster Manual (2000), Monster Manual v.3.5 (2003), Monster Manual v.5 (2014), Monster Manual v.5.5 (2025)	War and Wild	
Dolphin	Blackmoor set (1975), D&D Companion Rules (1984), MC2 – Monstrous Compendium Volume Two (1989), Dungeons & Dragons Rules Cyclopedia (1991), Monstrous Manual (1993), Mordenkainen presents Monsters of the Multiverse v.5 (2021)		Very intelligent creatures of lawful good alignment
Doppleganger	Greyhawk set (1974), D&D Basic Set (1977, 1981, 1983), Dragon #80 "The Psychology of the Doppleganger" (1983), MC2 – Monstrous Compendium Volume Two (1989), Dungeons & Dragons Rules Cyclopedia (1991), Monstrous Manual (1993), Monster Manual (2000), Monster Manual v.3.5 (2003), Monster Manual v.5 (2014), Monster Manual v.5.5 (2025)		Bipedal creatures able to shape themselves into the likeness of any humanoid creature they observe
Dragon			Powerful and intelligent, usually winged reptiles with magical abilities and breath weapon. The different subraces, distinguished by their colouring, vary in power. The dragon has been referred to as the "iconic creature for D&D adventurers to conquer".
-- Black Dragon (Draco Causticus Sputem)	Dungeons & Dragons set (1974), D&D Basic Set (1977, 1981, 1983), D&D Companion Rules (1984), MC1 – Monstrous Compendium Volume One (1989), Dungeons & Dragons Rules Cyclopedia (1991), Monstrous Manual (1993), Monster Manual (2000), Monster Manual v.3.5 (2003), D&D Miniatures: Dragoneye set #44 (2004), D&D Icons: Gargantuan Black Dragon (2006), D&D Miniatures: Unhallowed set #55 (2007), Monster Manual v.5 (2014), Monster Manual v.5.5 (2025)		Evil chaotic-aligned dragons that spit acid. They have horns projecting forward, a long body and thin tail.
-- Blue Dragon (Draco Electricus)	Dungeons & Dragons set (1974), D&D Basic Set (1981, 1983), D&D Companion Rules (1984), MC1 – Monstrous Compendium Volume One (1989), Dungeons & Dragons Rules Cyclopedia (1991), Monstrous Manual (1993), Monster Manual (2000), Monster Manual v.3.5 (2003), D&D Miniatures: Deathknell set #38 (2005), D&D Icons: Gargantuan Blue Dragon (2007), Monster Manual v.5 (2014), Monster Manual v.5.5 (2025)		Evil lawful-aligned dragons that discharge a bolt of lightning. They have a distinctive horn on their snout.
-- Brass Dragon (Draco Impudentus Gallus)	Greyhawk set (1974), D&D Basic Set (1997), MC1 – Monstrous Compendium Volume One (1989), Monstrous Manual (1993), Monster Manual (2000), Monster Manual v.3.5 (2003), D&D Miniatures: Dragoneye set #14 (2004), D&D Miniatures: Unhallowed set #19 (2007)		Benevolent and talkative good-aligned desert-dwelling dragons that can breathe sleep gas or fear-causing gas. An example of content misrepresented by the game's detractors.
-- Bronze Dragon (Draco Gerus Bronzo)	Greyhawk set (1974), MC1 – Monstrous Compendium Volume One (1989), Monstrous Manual (1993), Monster Manual (2000), Monster Manual v.3.5 (2003), D&D Miniatures: War Drums set #7 (2006), Monster Manual v.5 (2014), Monster Manual v.5.5 (2025)		Good and lawful-aligned dragons that breathe a bolt of lightning or a repulsion gas cloud
-- Chromatic Dragon (Tiamat)	Greyhawk set (1974), Dragon #38 (1980), Polyhedron #73 (1992), Dragon #272 (2000), Manual of the Planes (2001), Miniatures Handbook (2003) ("Aspect of Tiamat"), D&D Miniatures: War of the Dragon Queen set #24 (2006) ("Aspect of Tiamat")		Ruler of the first plane of the Nine Hells where she spawns all of evil dragonkind
-- Copper Dragon (Draco Comes Stabuli)	Greyhawk set (1974), MC1 – Monstrous Compendium Volume One (1989), Monstrous Manual (1993), Monster Manual (2000), Monster Manual v.3.5 (2003), D&D Miniatures: Angelfire set #21 (2005), D&D Miniatures: Desert of Desolation #23 (2007), Monster Manual v.5 (2014), Monster Manual v.5.5 (2025)		Good and chaotic-aligned dragons that breathe a discharge of acid or a cloud of gas that slows creatures
-- Gold Dragon (Draco Orientalus Sino Dux)	Dungeons & Dragons set (1974), D&D Basic Set (1981, 1983), D&D Companion Rules (1984), MC1 – Monstrous Compendium Volume One (1989), Dungeons & Dragons Rules Cyclopedia (1991), Monstrous Manual (1993), Monster Manual (2000), Monster Manual v.3.5 (2003), D&D Miniatures: Giants of Legend set #61 (2004), D&D Miniatures: Deathknell set #7 (2005), Monster Manual v.5 (2014), Monster Manual v.5.5 (2025)		Good and lawful-aligned dragons that breathe fire or chlorine gas
-- Green Dragon (Draco Chlorinous Nauseous Respiratorus)	Dungeons & Dragons set (1974), D&D Basic Set (1981, 1983), D&D Companion Rules (1984), MC1 – Monstrous Compendium Volume One (1989), Dungeons & Dragons Rules Cyclopedia (1991), Monstrous Manual (1993), Monster Manual (2000), Monster Manual v.3.5 (2003). D&D Miniatures: War of the Dragon Queen set #38 (2005), Monster Manual v.5 (2014), Monster Manual v.5.5 (2025)		Evil lawful-aligned dragons that breathe a cloud of poisonous chlorine gas
-- Platinum Dragon (Bahamut)	Greyhawk set (1974), Dragon #38 (1980), Polyhedron #73 (1992), Dragon #272 (2000), Manual of the Planes (2001), Miniatures Handbook (2003) ("Aspect of Bahamut"), D&D Miniatures: War of the Dragon Queen set #2 (2006) ("Aspect of Bahamut")		The King of Good Dragons, he dwells in a great fortified palace behind the east wind
-- Red Dragon (Draco Conflagratia Horriblus)	Dungeons & Dragons set (1974), D&D Basic Set (1977, 1981, 1983), D&D Companion Rules (1984), Dragon #134 "The Ecology of the Red Dragon" (1988), MC1 – Monstrous Compendium Volume One (1989), Dungeons & Dragons Rules Cyclopedia (1991), Monstrous Manual (1993), Monster Manual (2000), Monster Manual v.3.5 (2003), D&D Miniatures: Dragoneye set #55 (2004), D&D Miniatures: Giants of Legend set #71 (2004), D&D Icons: Colossal Red Dragon (2006), Monster Manual v.5 (2014), Monster Manual v.5.5 (2025)		Evil chaotic-aligned dragons that breathe a cone of fire. According to Dant et al. "one of the most fearsome and classic monsters" in role-playing games.
-- Silver Dragon (Draco Nobilis Argentum)	Greyhawk set (1974), MC1 – Monstrous Compendium Volume One (1989), Monstrous Manual (1993), Monster Manual (2000), Monster Manual v.3.5 (2003), D&D Miniatures: Archfiends set #5 (2004), Monster Manual v.5 (2014), Monster Manual v.5.5 (2025)		Good and lawful-aligned dragons that breathe a cone of frost or a cloud of paralyzing gas
-- White Dragon (Draco Rigidus Frigidus)	Dungeons & Dragons set (1974), D&D Basic Set (1977, 1981, 1983), D&D Companion Rules (1984), MC1 – Monstrous Compendium Volume One (1989), Dungeons & Dragons Rules Cyclopedia (1991), Monstrous Manual (1993), Monster Manual (2000), Monster Manual v.3.5 (2003), D&D Miniatures: Night Below #58 (2007), D&D Icons: Legend of Drizzt Scenario Pack (2007) ("Icingdeath, Gargantuan White Dragon"), Monster Manual v.5 (2014), Monster Manual v.5.5 (2025)		Evil chaotic-aligned dragons that breathe a cone of cold
Dragonne	AC9 – Creature Catalogue, MC2 – Monstrous Compendium Volume Two (1989), DMR2 – Creature Catalog (1993), Monstrous Manual (1993), Monster Manual (2000), Monster Manual v.3.5 (2003), D&D Miniatures: War Drums set #17 (2006)		Cross between a brass dragon and giant lion, roar causes weakness. Lion-headed dragon-like creature, it was "Originally described as 'a weird cross between a brass dragon and a giant lion'". Present "in every edition of the game", James Wyatt stated it was "probably the oldest manifestation in the game of the idea of a half-dragon". Renamed to liondrake in 5th edition.
Dragon turtle	D&D Expert Set (1981), D&D Companion Rules (1984), MC1 – Monstrous Compendium Volume One (1989), Dungeons & Dragons Rules, Cyclopedia (1991), Monstrous Manual (1993), Monster Manual (2000), Monster Manual v.3.5 (2003), Monster Manual v.5 (2014), Monster Manual v.5.5 (2025)		Gigantic water creatures found in very large rivers and lakes, can belch forth a cloud of scalding steam. Present in the game since its inception.
Dryad	Dungeons & Dragons set (1974), D&D Expert Set (1981, 1983), Dragon #87 "The Ecology of the Dryad" (1984), MC2 – Monstrous Compendium Volume Two (1989), Dungeons & Dragons Rules Cyclopedia (1991), Monstrous Manual (1993), Monster Manual (2000), Monster Manual v.3.5 (2003), Monster Manual v.5 (2014), Monster Manual v.5.5 (2025)		Beautiful, alluring tree sprites, only found near their oak trees. Based on the dryad from classical sources. The dryad appears as a player character class in Tall Tales of the Wee Folk in the "DM's booklet" (1989).
Dwarf	Dungeons & Dragons set (1974), D&D Basic Set (1977, 1981, 1983), Dungeons & Dragons Rules Cyclopedia (1991), MC2 – Monstrous Compendium Volume Two (1989), PHBR6 – The Complete Book of Dwarves (1991), Monstrous Manual (1993), Monster Manual (2000), Monster Manual v.3.5 (2003), Races of Stone (2004), Monster Manual v.5 (2014), Mordenkainen presents Monsters of the Multiverse v.5 (2021)		Rocky hill-dwellers that band together in clans. Based on Tolkien's version of the dwarf. Often depicted as "short, stout, and fond of ale", "bearded masters of metalworking" and "predisposed towards a "good" moral alignment", "tend to embody an extreme vision of masculinity".
Eagle, giant	AC9 – Creature Catalogue (1986), Monstrous Compendium Volume Two (1989), DMR2 – Creature Catalog (1993), Monstrous Manual (1993), Monster Manual (2000), Monster Manual v.3.5 (2003), D&D Miniatures: Night Below set #18 (2007), Monster Manual v.5 (2014), Monster Manual v.5.5 (2025)		Intelligent creatures found on great bluffs, cliffs, mesas, or mountain crags to rest on
Ear seeker	City of Delights (1993), Monstrous Manual (1993), Monstrous Compendium Annual Volume One (1994)		Small insectoids found in wood that live by eating dead cellulose, leave eggs in creatures head which hatch and larvae eat the host from the inside out
Eel	Blackmoor set (1975) (giant eel, weed eel), Monster Manual II (1983), AC9 – Creature Catalogue (1986), MC2 – Monstrous Compendium Volume Two (1989), DMR2 – Creature Catalog (1993), Monstrous Manual (1993), Stormwrack (2005)	electric, giant, and weed	
Efreet	Dungeons & Dragons set (1974), D&D Expert Set (1981, 1983), D&D Companion Rules (1984), MC1 – Monstrous Compendium Volume One (1989), Dungeons & Dragons Rules Cyclopedia (1991), Monstrous Manual (1993), Monster Manual (2000), Monster Manual v.3.5 (2003), D&D Miniatures: Angelfire set #39 (2005), Monster Manual v.5 (2014), Monster Manual v.5.5 (2025)		The djinn and efreet have namesakes from Arabic folklore also associated with air and fire, respectively. A depiction of an "evil [...] efreet" already appeared in the original Dungeons & Dragons (1974) edition, another "enormous, devilish red" one was the main feature of the cover of the 1st edition Dungeon Master's Guide. Within the game's cosmology they were based on the Plane of Fire, centered around the "fabled City of Brass".
Elemental	Dungeons & Dragons set (1974), D&D Expert Set (1981, 1983), MC1 – Monstrous Compendium Volume One (1989), Dungeons & Dragons Rules Cyclopedia (1991), Monstrous Manual (1993), Monster Manual (2000), Monster Manual v.3.5 (2003), Monster Manual v.5 (2014), Monster Manual v.5.5 (2025)	air, earth, fire, and water	Powerful creatures in the game; a characteristic of the air elemental is the ability of rapid movement.
Elephant	D&D Expert Set (1981, 1983), Monstrous Compendium Volume One (1989), Dungeons & Dragons Rules Cyclopedia (1991), Monstrous Manual (1993), Monster Manual (2000), Monster Manual v.3.5 (2003), Monster Manual v.5 (2014), Monster Manual v.5.5 (2025)	(Asiatic) elephant, and the loxodont (African Elephant)	
Elf	Dungeons & Dragons set (1974), Blackmoor set (1975) (aquatic elf), D&D Basic Set (1977, 1981, 1983), Monstrous Compendium Volume One (1989), Dungeons & Dragons Rules Cyclopedia (1991), PHBR8 – The Complete Book of Elves (1992), Monstrous Manual (1993), Monster Manual (2000), Monster Manual v.3.5 (2003), Races of the Wild (2005), Monster Manual v.5 (2014), Mordenkainen presents Monsters of the Multiverse v.5 (2021), Monster Manual v.5.5 (2025)		Based on Tolkien's version of the elf, "quick but fragile", with senses surpassing a human's, often depicted as "effeminate" and "predisposed towards a "good" moral alignment".
Ettin	Dragon #92 "Duh 'Cology of Duh Ettin" (1984), MC2 – Monstrous Compendium Volume Two (1989), Monstrous Manual (1993), Monster Manual (2000), Monster Manual v.3.5 (2003), D&D Miniatures: Deathknell set #52 (2005) (Ettin Skirmisher), Monster Manual v.5 (2014), Monster Manual v.5.5 (2025)		Giant-like creatures with two heads
Eye, floating	Blackmoor set (1975), WGA3 – Flames of the Falcon (1990), Monstrous Compendium Annual Volume Two (1995)		Salt water fish with transparent bodies that hypnotize with their single eye
Eye of the deep	Dragon #93 "The Ecology of the Eye of the Deep" (1985), AC9 – Creature Catalogue (1986) (as "Beholder, Aquatic"), MC1 – Monstrous Compendium Volume One (1989), DMR2 – Creature Catalog (1993) (as "Beholder, Aquatic"), Monstrous Manual (1993), I, Tyrant (1996), Lords of Madness (2005)		Beholder-like monster that dwells at the great depths of the ocean, attacks with lobster claws
Flightless bird	MC11 – Monstrous Compendium Forgotten Realms Appendix (1991) (as "Avian, Flightless Bird"), Dragon #186 (1992) ("Emu"), Monstrous Manual (1993)		Includes ostrich, emu, and rhea
Frog, giant	Blackmoor set (1975), MC2 – Monstrous Compendium Volume Two (1989), Monstrous Manual (1993), Return to the Temple of Elemental Evil (2001) ("Giant Frog"), D&D Miniatures: Deathknell set #28 ("Giant Frog"), Dungeon #126 (2005) ("Killer Frog"), Monster Manual v.5 (2014), Mordenkainen presents Monsters of the Multiverse v.5 (2021), Monster Manual v.5.5 (2025)	giant frog, killer frog, and poisonous frog	
Fungi, violet	MC2 – Monstrous Compendium Volume Two (1989), Monstrous Manual (1993), Monster Manual (2000), Monster Manual v.3.5 (2003), Monster Manual v.5 (2014), Monster Manual v.5.5 (2025)	nekrokollos	The branches of this fungus cause flesh to rot
Gar, giant	MC2 – Monstrous Compendium Volume Two (1989), Monstrous Manual (1993), Dragon #321 (2004)		
Gargoyle	Dungeons & Dragons set (1974), D&D Basic Set (1977, 1981, 1983), MC2 – Monstrous Compendium Volume Two (1989), Dungeons & Dragons Rules Cyclopedia (1991), Monstrous Manual (1993), Monster Manual (2000), Monster Manual v.3.5 (2003), D&D Miniatures: Dragoneye set #52 (2004), Monster Manual v.5 (2014), Monster Manual v.5.5 (2025)		Ferocious predators of a magical nature, found among ruins and attack anything they can detect. AD&D's gargoyle was adapted into the Magic: The Gathering trading card game, with a depiction taken from the Monster Manual being used in a prototype version.
Gas spore	D&D Companion Rules (1984) (as "Blast Spore"), Dragon #120 (1987) ("The Ecology of the Gas Spore"), MC2 – Monstrous Compendium Volume Two (1989), Dungeons & Dragons Rules Cyclopedia (1991), Monstrous Manual (1993), I, Tyrant (1996), Lords of Madness (2005), Monster Manual v.5 (2014), Monster Manual v.5.5 (2025)		Strongly resemble beholders, and explode violently when struck
Gelatinous cube	Greyhawk set (1974), Monster Manual v.5 (2014), Monster Manual v.5.5 (2025)		Cubic scavengers cleanse living organism and carrion from the floor and walls of underground passageways
Ghast	Dungeons & Dragons set (1974), Monster Manual v.5 (2014), Monster Manual v.5.5 (2025)		Indistinguishable from ghouls except for their carrion stench which causes retching and nausea. Undead with "terrible claws". AD&D's ghouls were also adapted into the Magic: The Gathering trading card game, with a depiction taken from the Monster Manual being used in a prototype version.
Ghost	Monster Manual v.5 (2014), Monster Manual v.5.5 (2025)		Spirits of evil humans who were so awful that they have been rewarded (or cursed) with undead status. Inspired by Gothic fiction, a typical denizen of the Ravenloft setting.
Ghoul	Monster Manual v.5 (2014), Monster Manual v.5.5 (2025)		Undead creatures, once human, who feed on corpses
Giant	Dungeons & Dragons set (1974); (Greyhawk set (1974) (storm giant)	cloud giant, fire giant, frost giant, hill giant, stone giant, and storm giant	Overlarge powerful humanoids with a self-involved social focus, usually presented as the "bad guys". Based on mythological figures and Tolkien, their stone-throwing ability indicates their creative roots in wargaming.
Gnoll	Dungeons & Dragons set (1974), Monster Manual v.5 (2014), Monster Manual v.5.5 (2025)		Resemble hyenas and live in rapacious bands. Richard W. Forest assumed them to be inspired from but not resembling the gnoles conceived by Lord Dunsany, while Gary Gygax himself stated that although Dunsany's "gnole" is close", he came up with the name as "a cross between a gnome and a troll", and the description was his original creation. He wanted to create a humanoid opponent in the game to fit in between the hobgoblin and bugbear in power. Gnolls were considered one of the "five main "humanoid" races" in AD&D by Paul Karczag and Lawrence Schick.
Gnome	Dungeons & Dragons set (1974), Monster Manual v.5 (2014), (playable in) Mordenkainen presents Monsters of the Multiverse v.5 (2021), Monster Manual v.5.5 (2025)		Smaller beings that live in clans. Player character race "often stereotyped as buffoons, illusionists, mad inventors, and many characters play them as intentionally "wacky" or anachronistic"; often conforms to the trickster archetype. "predisposed towards a "good" moral alignment".
Goat, giant	Monster Manual v.5 (2014), Monster Manual v.5.5 (2025)		
Goblin	Dungeons & Dragons set (1974), Monster Manual v.5 (2014), Monster Manual v.5.5 (2025)		Have a tribal society and dwell in dismal surroundings. Based primarily on the goblins portrayed in J.R.R. Tolkien's Middle-Earth. Considered one of the "five main "humanoid" races" in AD&D by Paul Karczag and Lawrence Schick. Presented as "evil" and "predisposed towards a society of brutal regimes where the strongest rule" in the game. Suitable opponent for characters of lowest level.
Golem		clay, flesh, iron, and stone	The clay golem is based on the golem of Medieval Jewish folklore, though changed from "a cherished defender to an unthinking hulk" while the flesh golem is related to Frankenstein's monster as Universal's 1931 film, seen in e.g. being empowered by electricity, as well as Gothic fiction more generally; a typical denizen of the Ravenloft setting, and "classic" monster of the game. Jon Garrad, in the book Mary Shelley's Frankenstein, 1818–2018 (2020), criticized the original flesh golem in Advanced Dungeons and Dragons (AD&D) as "superficial" and "simplified" compared to its Frankenstein (1818) inspiration. The influence of Dungeons & Dragons has led to the inclusion of golems in other tabletop role-playing as well as in video games.
Gorgon	Dungeons & Dragons set (1974), Monster Manual v.5 (2014), Monster Manual v.5.5 (2025)		Bull-like creatures covered in thick metal scales that breathe a cloud of noxious vapors which turn any creature to stone
Gray ooze	Dungeons & Dragons set (1974), Monster Manual v.5 (2014), Monster Manual v.5.5 (2025)		Slimy horror which inhabits subterranean places that closely resembles wet stone or sedimentary cave formations
Green slime	Dungeons & Dragons set (1974)		Strange plant growths that feed on animal, vegetable, and metallic substances
Griffon	Dungeons & Dragons set (1974), Monster Manual v.5 (2014), Monster Manual v.5.5 (2025)		Aggressive carnivores whose favorite prey is horses, seek cliffs and rocky habitats in which to build their nests. Originally based on the creature from Persian mythology.
Groaning spirit (Banshee), Monster Manual v.5 (2014), Monster Manual v.5.5 (2025)			Spirit of an evil female elf whose keening wail causes hearers to die on the spot. Inspired by Gothic fiction, a typical denizen of the Ravenloft setting.
Halfling			Hard-working, orderly and peaceful citizens of burrows. Based on and renamed from the hobbit in J.R.R. Tolkien's works. The hobbit first appeared as a player character class in the original 1974 edition of Dungeons & Dragons. Later the game began using the name "halfling" as an alternative to "hobbit" for legal reasons. The "halfling" appeared as a player character race in the original Player's Handbook (1978).
Harpy	Greyhawk set (1974), Monster Manual v.5 (2014), Monster Manual v.5.5 (2025)		Have the bodies of vultures but the upper torsos and heads of women, their sweet-sounding calls cause creatures to approach the harpy who then tortures and devours them. Based on the creature from Greek mythology. Witwer et al. viewed its artistic rendering in 5th edition as "redesigned from prior editions to entice more Dungeon Master use."
Hell hound	Greyhawk set (1974), Monster Manual v.5 (2014), Monster Manual v.5.5 (2025)		Not from the material plane, breathes out scorching fire. Don Turnbull noted that the breath weapon of the "much-feared" hell hound has been altered from its previous appearance.
Herd animal			Includes musk oxen, reindeer, giraffe, antelopes
Hippocampus	Dungeons & Dragons set (1974)		Prized marine steed, has the upper body of a horse and the long rear body of a great fish. Based on medieval bestiaries. "Depicted as the front half of a horse and the rear half of a fish or sea-serpent." Tyler Linn of Cracked.com listed it among the "15 Most Idiotic Monsters In Dungeons & Dragons History". He did not think " it would pose much of a threat" and "was intended to be one of the good guys", but found the depiction "douchey".
Hippogriff	Monster Manual v.5 (2014), Monster Manual v.5.5 (2025)		Nests on rocky crags, fierce fighters and omnivores. Originally based on the creature from Persian mythology. Originally based on the creature from Persian mythology the adapted hippogriff "was among the earliest fantasy beasts introduced into the Dungeons & Dragons universe": An artistic representation drawing inspiration from real eagles and horses was used for the cover of the third booklet of the original Dungeons & Dragons (1974) edition and became one of "the game's earliest ambassadors" through use of that cover in advertisements. Gary Gygax used a story in which he received a letter asking how many eggs a Hippogriff could lay as an example of the encyclopedic knowledge which fans expected him to have over every detail of gameplay.
Hippopotamus			
Hobgoblin	Dungeons & Dragons set (1974), Monster Manual v.5 (2014), Monster Manual v.5.5 (2025)		Tribal lawful evil creatures found nearly anywhere. Muscular humanoids somewhat taller than humans with reddish skin and canine teeth. Mordenkainen Presents: Monsters of the Multiverse gave them a new background as a species originating in and expelled from the Feywild, while also presenting hobgoblins societies with different characteristics on different worlds, but all centered around forming close-knit groups.
Homunculus	Greyhawk set (1974), Monster Manual v.5 (2014), Monster Manual v.5.5 (2025)		Creature created and animated through a special magical alchemical process to serve a magic-user
Horse	Monster Manual v.5 (2014), Monster Manual v.5.5 (2025)	draft, heavy, light, medium, pony, and wild	
Hydra	Dungeons & Dragons set (1974), Monster Manual v.5 (2014), Monster Manual v.5.5 (2025)		Multi-headed reptilian monsters found in marshes, swamps, and subterranean lairs. Based on the creature from classical sources, with Heracles' famed method of slaying it adapted into a vulnerability against fire, but not with the less well-known poisonous bite, showing how the game mostly focusses on the well-known traits of mythological creatures. Present in the game since its inception. AD&D's hydra was also adapted into the Magic: The Gathering trading card game, with a depiction taken from the Monster Manual being used in a prototype version.
Hyena		hyena and giant hyena (hyaenodon)	
Imp	Monster Manual v.5 (2014), Monster Manual v.5.5 (2025)		Common on the planes of Acheron and Hell, a minor devil created to spread evil as a familiar to a lawful evil magic-user or cleric. Minor fiends which could be created from larvae.
Intellect devourer	Eldritch Wizardry, Monster Manual v.5 (2014), Monster Manual v.5.5 (2025)		Dwells deep beneath the ground, subsists on the psychic energy of their prey. SyFy Wire in 2018 called it one of "The 9 Scariest, Most Unforgettable Monsters From Dungeons & Dragons", saying that "The idea of having your brain consumed and just becoming an evil puppet is truly terrible."
Invisible stalker	Dungeons & Dragons set (1974), Monster Manual v.5 (2014), Monster Manual v.5.5 (2025)		Creature from the elemental plane of air conjured to track a target
Irish deer			Moose-sized creatures of the Pleistocene epoch
Ixitxachitl	Blackmoor set (1975)		Intelligent rays dwelling in shallow tropical seas with evil disposition and clerica nature. An "old personal favorite" of reviewer Mark Theurer.
Jackal			
Jackalwere	The jackalwere first appeared in the first edition in the original Monster Manual (1977). The jackalwere appeared in second edition in the Monstrous Compendium Volume One (1989), and reprinted in the Monstrous Manual (1993). The jackalwere appeared in the third edition Fiend Folio (2003). The jackalwere appeared in the fourth edition in Monster Manual III (2010).		Malign foe of humankind, a jackal able to assume the form of a man, gaze puts creatures to sleep. An intelligent jackal with the ability to assume human and jackal-human-hybrid form and a sleep-inducing gaze.
Jaguar			
Ki-rin	Eldritch Wizardry (1976), Monstrous Compendium Volume Two (1989), Monstrous Manual (1993), psionic variant of the ki-rin in The Complete Psionics Handbook (1991), third edition Oriental Adventures (2001)		Race of lawful good aerial creatures that will aid humans if the need to combat evil is great Based on the kirin from Japanese mythology. An obituary to Gary Gygax specifically highlights the Ki-rin as an example of the way in which D&D embraces world culture and folklore. Black Gate reviewer Howard Andrew Jones called them "old stalwarts" of the game.
Kobold	Dungeons & Dragons set (1974), Monster Manual v.5 (2014), playable inMordenkainen presents Monsters of the Multiverse v.5 (2021), Monster Manual v.5.5 (2025)		Tribal creatures with war bands, found in dank, dark places. "[S]hort subterranean lizard-men", considered one of the "five main "humanoid" races" in AD&D by Paul Karczag and Lawrence Schick, and ranked among the weakest monsters in the game by Scott Baird from Screen Rant.
Lamia	Monster Manual v.5 (2014), Monster Manual v.5.5 (2025)		Upper torso, arms, and head of a human female, lower body of a beast, whose touch drains a creature's wisdom
Lammasu	Greyhawk set (1974)		Lawful good dwellers of warm regions, who aid and protect lawful good persons
Lamprey	Blackmoor set (1975)	normal and giant	
Larva			The most selfishly evil of all souls who sink to lower planes after death, and dwell in the gloom of Hades. Evil mortal transformed into comparatively harmless larva-like creature by a night hag and used as a currency on the lower planes.
Leech, giant	Blackmoor set (1975)		
Leopard			
Leprechaun			Small creatures of magical talent and mischievous nature that dwell in fair, green lands with lush hills and dales
Leucrotta			Weird creature that haunts deserted and desolated places, so ugly that other creatures cannot bear the sight of it
Lich	Greyhawk set (1974), Monster Manual v.5 (2014), Monster Manual v.5.5 (2025)		Created with the use of powerful and arcane magic, formerly ultra powerful magic-users now non-human and non-living. Emaciated undead spellcaster, a "classic" monster of the game.
Lion		lion, mountain lion, and spotted lion	
Lizard	Blackmoor set (1975) (fire lizard, minotaur lizard)	fire, giant, minotaur, and subterranean	
Lizard man	Greyhawk set (1974), playable in Mordenkainen presents Monsters of the Multiverse v.5 (2021)		Semi-aquatic, dwelling underwater, omnivorous but prefer human flesh
Locathah	Blackmoor set (1975)		Humanoid aquatic nomads, hunting and gathering food from bountiful warm waters
Lurker above			Carnivorous subterranean creature that can disguise itself as part of the ceiling
Lycanthrope	Dungeons & Dragons set (1974) (werewolf, wereboar, weretiger, werebear); Greyhawk set (1974) (wererat), Monster Manual v.5 (2014), Monster Manual v.5.5 (2025)	werebear, wereboar, wererat, weretiger, and werewolf	Afflicted shapechangers, whose condition could be transmitted like a disease; some available as player character races. Depiction of the werewolf is related to those in 1930s and 1940s Hollywood movies like The Wolf Man. Ranked sixth among the ten best low-level monsters by the authors of Dungeons & Dragons For Dummies: "a classic monster", interesting due to shapechanging because "players can never be entirely sure whether that surly villager might indeed be the great black wolf who attacked their characters out in the forest." The presence of lyncanthropes in the gaming system is one of the elements that has led Christian fundamentalists to condemn Dungeons & Dragons and to associate it with the occult. Screen Rant has described the operation of lycanthropy in the game as an aspect that "makes no sense" because it is often a positive development for a character. "It is possible for a character to be infected with lycanthropy in Dungeons & Dragons and it comes highly recommended, as the benefits outweigh the negatives". It notes that "[i]n exchange for learning how to control your condition, you gain Damage Reduction, +2 to your Wisdom stat, the Scent ability, Low-Light Vision, a new Hit Dice, the Iron Will feat, and the ability to transform into a more powerful form". An illustration in one edition of the Monster Manual implied that the beast in Disney's Beauty and the Beast was a lycanthrope, with a creature having a resemblance to the Beast attacking a human resembling that film's antagonist, Gaston. Present in the game since its inception, an image of a werewolf's face by Gygax' childhood friend Tom Keogh was "[a]lmost certainly the oldest piece of art" in the original D&D.
Lynx, giant			Very intelligent and speak their own language
Mammoth			
Manticore	Dungeons & Dragons set (1974)		Has a lion body, bat wings, and a human head, attacks by loosing a volley of iron spikes from its tail. Based on its mythological counterpart, including the barbed tail, the manticore appeared in the game from its earliest edition.
Masher	Blackmoor set (1975)		Worm-like fish move along coral reefs, defends itself with poisoned spines
Mastodon			
Medusa	Dungeons & Dragons set (1974), Monster Manual v.5 (2014), Monster Manual v.5.5 (2025)		Hateful humanoid creatures that try to beguile humans to look into their eyes, causing them to turn to stone. Based on the creature from classical sources but translated into species of monsters originated from "humans seeking eternal youth". Reviewer Allan Rausch found their portrayal as "a woman with snakes for hair" up to 2nd edition less compelling than their less human-like depiction in 3rd edition. Part of the game from its very beginning, a medusa was already depicted in the playtest material from 1973 for the original edition.
Men		bandit (brigand), berserker, buccaneer (pirate), caveman (tribesman), dervish (nomad), merchant, pilgrim	Berserkers are based on the berserkir, "men of Odin, whom the god made strong like wild beasts", from Icelandic sagas and Snorri Sturluson's history of the kings of Norway.
Merman	Blackmoor set (1975)		Found in the seas and oceans and have regular undersea communities
Mimic	Monster Manual v.5 (2014), Monster Manual v.5.5 (2025)		Subterranean creatures that are able to perfectly mimic stone and wood. An original creation for the game's artificial underground environment, this "iconic monster" looks like a treasure chest and is designed as a trap for unwary player characters.
Mind flayer	Eldritch Wizardry, Monster Manual v.5 (2014), Monster Manual v.5.5 (2025)		Evil subterranean creature that considers humanity as cattle to feed upon, draws forth brains with its tentacles. "Squid-headed humanoids", considered one of "the game's signature monsters" by Philip J. Clements. Reviewer Julien Blondel described them as vile brain-eating creatures full of psionic energy. He found them delightful creatures for a sadistic Dungeon Master to use, and a useful bridge between classic game worlds and the planes, as illithids abound in both.
Minotaur	Dungeons & Dragons set (1974), Monster Manual v.5 (2014), playable in Mordenkainen presents Monsters of the Multiverse v.5 (2021), Monster Manual v.5.5 (2025)		Cruel man-eaters, typically found in labyrinthe places in the wilderness and underground. Based on the creature from Greek mythology, but translated from a singular creature into a species. In 2021, Comic Book Resources counted the minotaur as one of the "7 Underused Monster Races in Dungeons & Dragons", stating that "far from just brutal monsters. Many are lawful by nature, which means, surprisingly, Minotaurs make for some good Paladins. They also, obviously, make for some good Barbarians, Monks and Fighters. There's a lot of potential with Minotaurs. People hate and fear them, but you might be able to play that to your advantage...or fight against the stereotypes." The minotaur was among the monsters featured as trading cards on the back of Amurol Products candy figure boxes. AD&D's minotaurs were also adapted into the Magic: The Gathering trading card game, with a depiction taken from the Monster Manual being used in a prototype version.
Mold	Dungeons & Dragons set (1974) (yellow)	brown and yellow	
Morkoth	Blackmoor set (1975), Mordenkainen presents Monsters of the Multiverse v.5 (2021)		Dim, shadowy monster, "wraith of the deep," lairs in a series of spiraling tunnels. Paste magazine reviewer Cameron Kunzelmann found the morkoth an inventive and "super weird" monster beyond the game's staples.
Mule			
Mummy	Dungeons & Dragons set (1974), Monster Manual v.5 (2014), Monster Manual v.5.5 (2025)		Undead humans that retain a semblance of life and seek to destroy living things. Don Turnbull noted that the mummy was revised from its previous statistics, and could now cause paralysis on sight (as a result of fear).
Naga	Monster Manual v.5 (2014), playable in Mordenkainen presents Monsters of the Multiverse v.5 (2021), Monster Manual v.5.5 (2025)	guardian, spirit, and water	Based on the nāga from Indian mythology.
Neo-otyugh			Larger, more intelligent species of otyugh
Night hag			Rule the convoluted planes of Hades, form larvae (see above) from evil persons they slay, and sell to demons and devils. Powerful hag from Hades, propagating evil by creating larvae. Don Turnbull referred to the night hag as "splendid" and notes that the illustration of the night hag is the best drawing in the book. It has been described as comparable to the Alp of folklore, although "considered a more Judeo-Christian demonic influence".
Nightmare			"Demon horse" or "hell horse" from the lower plans, ridden primarily by powerful demons and devils, night hags, vampires, and liches
Nixie	Dungeons & Dragons set (1974)		Water sprites that inhabit lakes and dwell in living seaweed
Nymph			Beautiful, ever-young women that inhabit lovely wilderness places, and can cast druidic spells. Based on the nymph from Greek mythology, also an instance of the sexist tropes the game draws on which presented female sexuality as inherently dangerous. Appeared in the movie Futurama: Bender's Game.
Ochre jelly	Dungeons & Dragons set (1974), Monster Manual v.5 (2014), Monster Manual v.5.5 (2025)		Form of giant amoeba that seeps about in dungeons, hunting for flesh to devour. Ian Livingstone considered the ochre jelly one of the game's more "exotic and strange creatures".
Octopus, giant	Blackmoor set (1975), Monster Manual v.5 (2014), Monster Manual v.5.5 (2025)		
Ogre	Dungeons & Dragons set (1974), Monster Manual v.5 (2014), Monster Manual v.5.5 (2025)		Ugly-tempered and voracious creatures sometimes found as mercenaries. Large, powerful humanoid creatures, with slightly below average intelligence. Typical bad guys in the game, who can be used to teach "players about fighting big, powerful, stupid monsters, which is an iconic D&D experience".
Ogre mage (Japanese ogre)	Greyhawk set (1974)		
Orc	Dungeons & Dragons set (1974), Monster Manual v.5 (2014), Monster Manual v.5.5 (2025)		Fiercely competitive bullies, tribal creatures often living underground. Directly adapted from the orc in J.R.R. Tolkien's works. Considered one of the "five main "humanoid" races" in AD&D by Paul Karczag and Lawrence Schick. Presented as "evil" and "savage raiders" in the game.
Otter, giant	Blackmoor set (1975)		
Otyugh	Monster Manual v.5 (2014), Monster Manual v.5.5 (2025)		Weird omnivorous scavengers whose diet consists of dung, offal, and carrion, always found underground. Also known as gulguthra. Don Turnbull referred to the otyugh as a "most interesting creation".
Owl, giant	Monster Manual v.5 (2014), Monster Manual v.5.5 (2025)		Very intelligent nocturnal predators will sometimes befriend other creatures
Owlbear	Greyhawk set (1974), Monster Manual v.5 (2014), Monster Manual v.5.5 (2025)		Horrible creatures that inhabit tangled forest regions, attacks with great claws and snapping beak. Newly created for the game early on inspired by a Hong Kong–made plastic toy, the owlbear was well-received as a useful and memorable monster.
Pegasus	Dungeons & Dragons set (1974), Monster Manual v.5 (2014), Monster Manual v.5.5 (2025)		Chaotic good intelligent winged horses that make the swiftest of steeds. Taken from greek mythology, an example of the diverse cultures amalgamated into D&D. Part of the game from its very beginning, a pegasus was already depicted in the playtest material from 1973 for the original edition.
Peryton	Dragon #82 (1984), Monstrous Compendium Forgotten Realms Appendix II (1991), Monstrous Manual (1993), Monsters of Faerûn (2001), Monster Vault 2: Threats to the Nentir Vale (2011), Monster Manual v.5 (2014), Monster Manual v.5.5 (2025)		Omnivorous creatures of the weirdest appearance, having the lower bodies of birds and the upper bodies of stags
Piercer			Inhabit caves and caverns and are indistinguishable from stalactites clinging to cave roofs, drop down on opponents to kill them
Pike, giant			
Pixie	Dungeons & Dragons set (1974), Monster Manual v.5 (2014), Monster Manual v.5.5 (2025)		Idyllic woodland dwellers that are naturally invisible, carry slim swords and war arrows that puts an opponent to sleep. The pixie appeared as a player character class in Tall Tales of the Wee Folk (1989).
Porcupine, giant			
Portuguese man-o-war, giant	Blackmoor set (1975)		
Pseudo-dragon	Monster Manual v.5 (2014), Monster Manual v.5.5 (2025)		These highly sought after creatures can deliver a vicious bite with their small jaws, but also have a flexible sting-equipped tail. "a miniature dragon that also has a tail stinger" Reviewer Philippe Tessier found it "very nice" and interesting when made available as a familiar.
Purple worm	Dungeons & Dragons set (1974), Monster Manual v.5 (2014), Monster Manual v.5.5 (2025)		50-foot-long (15 m) burrowing worms constantly in search of food, can swallow human-sized creatures whole. The "dread purple worm" attacks with both ends, maw and stinger. This "iconic monster" and original creation of Dungeons & Dragons is present all editions of the game.
Quasit	Monster Manual v.5 (2014), Monster Manual v.5.5 (2025)		Common on the planes of Pandemonium and the Abyss, a minor demon created to spread evil as a familiar to a chaotic evil magic-user or cleric. Reviewer Philippe Tessier found the quasit "very nice" and interesting when made available as a familiar.
Rakshasa	Monster Manual v.5 (2014), Monster Manual v.5.5 (2025)		Evil spirits encased in flesh, first known in India, fond of a diet of human meat and masters of illusion. Based on the creature from Hindu mythology. Humanoid fiends with tigerlike-features, Reactor magazine commentator Saladin Ahmed rated them as "ultimate badass monsters". He found a depiction sitting with pipe and smoking-jacket fitting on second thought, as the creature is so powerful it has no need to prove its dangerousness.
Ram, giant			
Rat, giant (Sumatran)	Monster Manual v.5 (2014), Monster Manual v.5.5 (2025)		Example of a monster posing little threat to the characters in the game, suitable for play at lowest level.
Ray	Blackmoor set (1975) (pungi, manta)	manta ray, pungi ray, and stingray	
Remorhaz	The Dragon #2 (1976), Monster Manual v.5 (2014), Monster Manual v.5.5 (2025)		Polar worms, huge aggressive predators
Rhinoceros		rhinoceros and wooly rhinoceros	
Roc	Dungeons & Dragons set (1974), Monster Manual v.5 (2014), Monster Manual v.5.5 (2025)		Huge eagle-like birds that inhabit the highest mountains, and prey upon large creatures such as cattle, horses, and elephants. An enormous bird, based on a mythological creature probably of Persian origin, known from Sindbad the Sailor.
Roper	Monster Manual v.5 (2014), Monster Manual v.5.5 (2025)		Cavern dwellers that stand upright to resemble pillars or stalagmites, can draw prey into their toothy maws with strands of strong, sticky rope-like excretions. A dangerous inhabitant of the Underdark with "murderous behavior". One of the original creations for the game, Witwer et al. rated them among the "iconic D&D monsters".
Rot grub	"The Ecology of the Rot Grub", Dragon #122 (June 1987). Monstrous Compendium Volume Two (1989). Monstrous Manual (1993). Dungeonscape (2007). Monster Manual 3 (2010). Volo's Guide to Monsters.		Found in heaps of offal or dung, will viciously burrow into living flesh until they reach the heart and kill their host. An original creation for the game's artificial underground environment, this monster was designed as a trap for unwary player characters: living in corpses, they infect those who disturb these dead searching for riches.
Rust monster	Greyhawk set (1974), Monster Manual v.5 (2014), Monster Manual v.5.5 (2025)		Subterranean inhabitants that eat ferrous metals such as iron, steel, and steel alloys. An original invention for the game and its artificial underground world, the appearance of the rust monster was inspired by a plastic toy from Hong Kong. It was ranked among the most memorable as well as obnoxious creatures in the game, terrifying to certain characters and their players not due to their ability to fight but to destroy their items. Chris Sims of the on-line magazine Comics Alliance referred to the rust monster as "the most feared D&D monster".
Sahuagin	Blackmoor set (1975), Monster Manual v.5 (2014), Monster Manual v.5.5 (2025)		"Seadevils" dwell in warm salt water depths, predatory in the extreme and kill for sport and pleasure as well as food
Salamander	Greyhawk set (1974), Monster Manual v.5 (2014), Monster Manual v.5.5 (2025)		Evil creatures of the elemental plane of fire that prefer temperatures of 300 degrees and upwards
Satyr	Gods, Demi-Gods & Heroes (1976), Monster Manual v.5 (2014), playable in Mordenkainen presents Monsters of the Multiverse v.5 (2021), Monster Manual v.5.5 (2025)		Sylvan woodland inhabitants primarily interested in sport such as frolicking, piping, chasing wood nymphs. Based on the satyr from classical sources.
Scorpion, giant	Monster Manual v.5 (2014), Monster Manual v.5.5 (2025)		Scorpions have the distinction of having been the very first combat encounter in the first playtest, run by Gary Gygax, of the original version of the game. Scorpion the size of a horse, its stinger carries a deadly poison.
Sea hag			Inhabit thickly vegetated shallows, they hate beauty and are so ghastly in appearance to make other creatures weak with fright
Sea horse, giant	Blackmoor set (1975), Monster Manual v.5 (2014), Monster Manual v.5.5 (2025)		
Sea lion			Fearsome carnivores that inhabit coastal marine waters, whose top halves resemble lions and bottom halves resemble sea creatures
Shadow	Greyhawk set (1974), Monster Manual v.5 (2014), Monster Manual v.5.5 (2025)		Horrible undead creatures that drain strength merely by touching an opponent. Don Turnbull noted his disappointment that the shadow in the Monster Manual is of the undead class and thus subject to a cleric's turn undead ability: "I used to enjoy seeing clerics vainly trying to turn what wouldn't turn, when Shadows were first met". Rob Bricken of io9 identified the shadow as one of "The 12 Most Obnoxious Dungeons & Dragons Monsters".
Shambling mound			Apparent heaps of rotting vegetation shamblers are intelligent forms of vegetable life that suffocate prey in their slime. Plant-like creature resembling a heap of rotting vegetation. Ben Woodard considered its ability to move "the base creepiness of the creep".
Shark	Blackmoor set (1975) (giant shark), Monster Manual v.5 (2014), Monster Manual v.5.5 (2025)	shark and giant shark (megalodon)	
Shedu	Eldritch Wizardry		Lawful good creatures that travel around the world seeking to help allied creatures when in need
Shrieker			Mindless ambulatory fungus that emit a piercing shriek when any light source or movement comes nearby. Scott Baird from Screen Rant ranked the man-sized shrieker among the weakest monsters in the game, at "the bottom of the mushroom monster food chain": They "can be used as cheap alarm systems for Underdark societies, but they possess no combat abilities of their own. The only thing a shrieker can do is shriek".
Skeleton	Dungeons & Dragons set (1974), Monster Manual v.5 (2014), Monster Manual v.5.5 (2025)		Magically animated, undead monsters enchanted by powerful magic-users or clerics of evil alignment. The skeleton was ranked second among the ten best low-level monsters by the authors of Dungeons & Dragons For Dummies: "introduces players to the special advantages and weaknesses of undead monsters". They also thank Ray Harryhausen for people knowing what fighting skeletons ought to look like. Screen Rant ranked the tiny skeleton one of the weakest D&D creatures, saying "[skeletons] go all the way down to Tiny-sized creatures, which means that it is possible for your party of adventurers to fight a group of skeletons that are the same size as action figures."
Skunk, giant			
Slithering tracker			Transparent and almost impossible to discover, attacks when prey is asleep by drawing all the plasma from its body. Intelligent stealthy jelly creature. Either evolved from simpler relatives, or persons magically transfigured "by hags and liches into a blobby puddle of remains" motivated by revenge. Reviewer Zack Furniss saw the monster on the "more horrific side of D&D" and observed: "even once they've found their vengeance, they're still a nasty blob and often go insane because they can't find satiation or communicate. Grim stuff."
Slug, giant	Greyhawk set (1974)		
Snake, giant	Monster Manual v.5 (2014), Monster Manual v.5.5 (2025)	amphisbaena, constrictor, poisonous snake, sea snake, and spitting snake	
Spectre	Dungeons & Dragons set (1974)		Powerful undead humans that haunt the most desolate of places, tombs and dungeons, and drain the life energy of opponents. Inspired by Gothic fiction, a typical denizen of the Ravenloft setting.
Sphinx	Gods, Demi-Gods & Heroes (1976), Monster Manual v.5 (2014), Monster Manual v.5.5 (2025)	androsphinx, criosphinx, gynosphinx, and hieracosphinx	Based on Egyptian and Classical mythology, an example of the diverse cultures amalgamated into D&D.
Spider	Greyhawk set (1974) (phase spider), Blackmoor set (1975) (water spider), Monster Manual v.5 (2014), Monster Manual v.5.5 (2025)	giant, huge, large, phase spider, and giant water	Academics Greg Gillespie and Darren Crouse considered the "giant poisonous spider", possessing some intelligence, an "iconic early D&D monster". Phase spider: Arachnid as big as a medium-large dog that can shift between dimensions and bite with fangs of deadly poison.
Sprite			Dwell in meadows and wooded glens, shy and reclusive, armed with arrows that put creatures to sleep
Squid, giant	Blackmoor set (1975)		
Stag		normal and giant	
Stirge	Greyhawk set (1974)		Found in dark, tangled forests or in subterranean lairs, and lay in wait for warm-blooded creatures to drink their blood. Flying and blood-sucking bird-like creatures. "[P]esky" because while small they are dangerous to characters as a swarm. Present in the game since its earliest edition.
Strangle weed			Intelligent kelp found in relatively warm sea water, crushes victims with its fronds
Su-monster	Eldritch Wizardry		Inhabits forsaken wilderness areas, has a prehensile tail to swing from limb from limb, has psionic attack
Sylph			Beautiful winged creatures similar to nymphs that dwell in aerial places
Thought eater	Eldritch Wizardry, PHBR5 – Complete Psionics Handbook (1991), Monstrous Manual (1993), Psionics Handbook (2001), Expanded Psionics Handbook (2004)		Dwellers in the ether attracted by the use of psionics, that can absorb psionic or spell energy
Tick, giant	Greyhawk set (1974), D&D Basic Set (1977), Monstrous Manual (1993), Dragon #321		
Tiger	D&D Basic Set (1981, 1983), MC1 – Monstrous Compendium Volume One (1989), Dungeons & Dragons Rules Cyclopedia (1991), Monstrous Manual (1993), Monster Manual (2000), Monster Manual v.3.5 (2003), Frostburn (2004)	tiger and sabre-tooth tiger (smilodon)	
Titan	Greyhawk set (1974), MC8 – Monstrous Compendium Outer Planes Appendix (1991), Monstrous Manual (1993), Monster Manual (2000), Monster Manual v.3.5 (2003)		Dwell on a plane somewhere above the material plane, chaotic good beings that resemble 18-foot-tall (5.5 m) humans. Based on the powerful beings from Greek mythology. Ranked among the strongest creatures in the game by Scott Baird from Screen Rant, as they "stand above giants and possess even more power in terms of their physical and magical capabilities". Backstab reviewer Michaël Croitoriu thought them truly interesting for powergamers when made available as player characters.
Titanothere	D&D Expert Set (1981), AC9 – Creature Catalogue (1986), MC3 – Monstrous Compendium Volume Three: Forgotten Realms Appendix (1989), DMR2 – Creature Catalog (1993), Monstrous Compendium Annual Volume Two (1995)		
Toad, giant	Blackmoor set (1975), D&D Expert Set (1981, 1983), MC1 – Monstrous Compendium Volume One (1989), Dungeons & Dragons Rules Cyclopedia (1991), Monstrous Manual (1993), Oriental Adventures (2001), Frostburn (2004)	giant, ice and poisonous	
Trapper	Strategic Review #5 (1975), Dragon #84 "The Ecology of the Trapper" (1984), MC2 – Monstrous Compendium Volume Two (1989), Monstrous Manual (1993)		Clever monsters that can shape their flat bodies to appear as part of a stone floor. An original creation for the game's artificial underground environment, this monster was designed as a trap for unwary player characters; the trapper camouflages as a piece of floor, engulfing a victim stepping on it. Rob Bricken of io9 identified the lurker and the trapper as two of "The 12 Most Obnoxious Dungeons & Dragons Monsters".
Treant	Dungeons & Dragons set (1974) (originally listed as "Ents"), D&D Expert Set (1981), Dragon #79 "The Ecology of the Treant" (1983), D&D Expert Set (1983), MC1 – Monstrous Compendium Volume One (1989), Dungeons & Dragons Rules Cyclopedia (1991), Monstrous Manual (1993), Monster Manual (2000), Monster Manual v.3.5 (2003), D&D Miniatures: Giants of Legend set #63 (2004), Monster Manual v.5 (2014), Monster Manual v.5.5 (2025)		Combines features of both humans and trees, dwell in forests and are indistinguishable from trees, can cause trees to come to life and move. Based on the Ent by J. R. R. Tolkien, and renamed due to copyright reasons.
Triton	Greyhawk set (1974), AC9 – Creature Catalogue (1986), MC2 – Monstrous Compendium Volume Two (1989), DMR2 – Creature Catalog (1993), Monstrous Manual (1993), Monster Manual (2000), Monster Manual v.3.5 (2003), playable in Mordenkainen presents Monsters of the Multiverse v.5 (2021)		Rumored to be from the elemental plane of water, sea dwellers with the upper bodies of humans and the lower bodies of fish. An aquatic race based on the merman in Greek mythology.
Troglodyte	D&D Basic Set (1977, 1981, 1983), MC2 – Monstrous Compendium Volume Two (1989), Dungeons & Dragons Rules Cyclopedia (1991), Monstrous Manual (1993), Dragon #235 "The Ecology of the Troglodyte" (1996), Monster Manual (2000), Monster Manual v.3.5 (2003), D&D Miniatures: Dragoneye set #60 (2004)		Reptilian humanoids that dwell in subterranean places, loathe humans and slaughter all they encounter
Troll	Dungeons & Dragons set (1974), D&D Basic Set (1977), D&D Expert Set (1981, 1983), MC1 – Monstrous Compendium Volume One (1989), Dungeons & Dragons Rules Cyclopedia (1991), Monstrous Manual (1993), Monster Manual (2000), Dragon #301 "Malignant Growth: The Ecology of the Troll" (2002), Monster Manual v.3.5 (2003), D&D Miniatures: Harbinger set #77 (2003), Monster Manual v.5 (2014), Monster Manual v.5.5 (2025)		Horrid carnivores that know no fear and are able to regenerate damage taken. Tall green-skinned evil gaunt humanoids. A characteristic denizen of AD&D worlds. Their appearance and powerful regenerative ability is taken from Three Hearts and Three Lions by Poul Anderson rather than from their mythological or Tolkienesque counterparts. Considered one of the "five main "humanoid" races" in AD&D by Paul Karczag and Lawrence Schick.
Turtle, giant	MC5 – Monstrous Compendium Greyhawk Appendix (1990), Monstrous Compendium Annual Volume Two (1995), Stormwrack (2005)	giant sea and giant snapping	
Umber hulk	Greyhawk set (1974), AC9 – Creature Catalogue (1986) (as "Hook Beast, Hulker"), MC1 – Monstrous Compendium Volume One (1989), Dragon #152 "The Ecology of the Umber Hulk" (1989), DMR2 – Creature Catalog (as "Hook Beast, Hulker), Monstrous Manual (1993), Monster Manual (2000), Monster Manual v.3.5 (2003), D&D Miniatures: Harbinger set #78 (2003)		Subterranean predators with iron-like claws that enable them to burrow through solid stone, and their eyes cause a dangerous confusion in opponents. Present in the game since the earliest edition, and considered "a classic D&D monsters" by academics Greg Gillespie and Darren Crouse.
Unicorn	Dungeons & Dragons set (1974), D&D Basic Set (1977), D&D Expert Set (1981), Dragon #77 "The Ecology of the Unicorn" (1983), D&D Expert Set (1983), MC1 – Monstrous Compendium Volume One (1989), Dungeons & Dragons Rules Cyclopedia (1991), Monstrous Manual (1993), Monster Manual (2000), Monster Manual v.3.5 (2003), D&D Miniatures: Archfiends set #22 (2004), Monster Manual v.5 (2014), Monster Manual v.5.5 (2025)		Dwelling in temperate woodlands, these chaotic good creatures shun contact with nearly all creatures. Based on the creature from medieval bestiaries. The Dungeons & Dragons animated series featured Uni the unicorn as a well-received "mascot" and "cute animal sidekick".
Vampire	Dungeons & Dragons set (1974), Supplement I: Greyhawk (1975), D&D Basic Set (1977), D&D Expert Set (1981, 1983), MC1 – Monstrous Compendium Volume One (1989), Dungeons & Dragons Rules Cyclopedia (1991), Monstrous Manual (1993), Monster Manual (2000), Monster Manual v.3.5 (2003), Monster Manual v.5 (2014), Monster Manual v.5.5 (2025)		Chaotic evil, night-prowling creatures and their powerful negative force drains life energy from victims. Depiction is related to those in 1930s and 1940s Hollywood Dracula movies, as well as folklore and Gothic fiction; a typical denizen of the Ravenloft setting, and "classic" monster of the game.
Wasp, giant	Blackmoor set (1975), Monstrous Manual (1993), Monster Manual (2000), Monster Manual v.3.5 (2003), Monster Manual v.5 (2014), Monster Manual v.5.5 (2025)		
Water weird	AC9 – Creature Catalogue (1986), MC2 – Monstrous Compendium Volume Two (1989), DMR2 – Creature Catalog (1993), Monstrous Manual (1993), Monster Manual II (2002), Dragon #347 "The Ecology of the Elemental Weird" (2006)		Originating from the elemental place of water, attacks all living things, feeding from their essences. An "old personal favorite" of reviewer Mark Theurer.
Weasel, giant	D&D Expert Set (1981), D&D Companion Rules (1984), MC2 – Monstrous Compendium Volume Two (1989), Dungeons & Dragons Rules Cyclopedia (1991), Monstrous Compendium Annual Volume Two (1995)		
Whale	Blackmoor set (1975), D&D Expert Set (1981), D&D Companion Rules (1984), MC2 – Monstrous Compendium Volume Two (1989), Dungeons & Dragons Rules Cyclopedia (1991), Monstrous Manual (1993), Monster Manual (2000), Monster Manual v.3.5 (2003)		
Wight	Dungeons & Dragons set (1974), D&D Basic Set (1977, 1981, 1983), MC1 – Monstrous Compendium Volume One (1989), Dungeons & Dragons Rules Cyclopedia (1991), Monstrous Manual (1993), Monster Manual (2000), Monster Manual v.3.5 (2003), D&D Miniatures: Harbinger set #52 (2003), Dragon #348 "The Ecology of the Wight" (2006)		Undead humans that inhabit barrow mounds or catacombs, evil and hateful, seeking to destroy all life they encounter. Thin humanoid undead. Directly adapted from the barrow-wight in Tolkien's The Lord of the Rings, while the concept is inspired Icelandic sagas. Rob Bricken of io9 identified the wight as one of "The 12 Most Obnoxious Dungeons & Dragons Monsters".
Will-o-(the)-wisp	Greyhawk set (1974), Dragon #99 "The Ecology of the Will-o-Wisp" (1985), MC1 – Monstrous Compendium Volume One (1989), Monstrous Manual (1993), Monster Manual (2000), Monster Manual v.3.5 (2003), Dragon: Monster Ecologies "The Ecology of the Will-O'-Wisp" (2007)		Commonly haunt deserted bogs, fens, swamps and the like, feeds upon the life force of dying beings
Wind walker	Strategic Review #3 (1975), ALQ2 – Assassin Mountain (1993), Monstrous Compendium Annual Volume One (1994)		Creatures from the elemental plane of air that attack by wind force
Wolf	D&D Basic Set (1981, 1983), MC1 – Monstrous Compendium Volume One (1989), Dungeons & Dragons Rules Cyclopedia (1991), Monstrous Manual (1993), Monster Manual (2000), Monster Manual v.3.5 (2003), D&D Miniatures: Harbinger set #80 (2003) (worg), D&D Miniatures: Harbinger set #37 (2003) (wolf), D&D Miniatures: Underdark set #60 (2005) (winter wolf), Monster Manual v.5 (2014), Monster Manual v.5.5 (2025)	wolf, dire wolf (worg), and winter wolf	Worgs are giant wolves inspired by the wargs in the works of J.R.R. Tolkien; the name was changed for legal reasons, while both word an concept ultimately go back to Old Norse idea of varg, which can refer to wolves in their violent aspect.
Wolverine	MC2 – Monstrous Compendium Volume Two (1989), Monstrous Manual (1993), Monstrous Compendium Annual Volume Two (1995), Monster Manual (2000), Monster Manual v.3.5 (2003), D&D Miniatures: Angelfire set #54 (2005) (fiendish dire wolverine)	normal and giant	
Wraith	Dungeons & Dragons set (1974), D&D Basic Set (1977), D&D Expert Set (1981, 1983), MC1 – Monstrous Compendium Volume One (1989), Dungeons & Dragons Rules Cyclopedia (1991), Monstrous Manual (1993), Monster Manual (2000), Monster Manual v.3.5 (2003), D&D Miniatures: Harbinger set #53 (2003)		Undead, similar to wights, with a chilling touch that drains life energy. Inspired by and renamed from the Nazgul from J.R.R. Tolkien's legendarium, as well as by Gothic fiction, a typical denizen of the Ravenloft setting.
Wyvern	Dungeons & Dragons set (1974), D&D Expert Set (1981, 1983), MC1 – Monstrous Compendium Volume One (1989), Dungeons & Dragons Rules Cyclopedia (1991), Monstrous Manual (1993), Dragon Annual #1 "The Ecology of the Wyvern" (1996), Monster Manual (2000), Monster Manual v.3.5 (2003), D&D Miniatures: Aberrations set #25 (2004), Monster Manual v.5 (2014), Monster Manual v.5.5 (2025)		Distantly related to dragons, stupid but very aggressive, can lash with sting-equipped tail. Its tail is equipped with a poisonous tail stinger.
Xorn	MC 2 – Monstrous Compendium Volume Two (1989), Monstrous Manual (1993), Monster Manual (2000), Monster Manual v.3.5 (2003), D&D Miniatures: Underdark set #28 (2005)		From the elemental plane of earth, feed on certain rare minerals, snacks upon copper and silver
Yeti	Strategic Review #3 (1975), Dragon #127 "The Ecology of the Yeti" (1987), MC1 – Monstrous Compendium Volume One (1989), Monstrous Manual (1993), Oriental Adventures (2001), Frostburn (2004), Monster Manual v.5 (2014), Monster Manual v.5.5 (2025)		Inhabits regions of icy cold, very fond of human flesh
Zombie	Dungeons & Dragons set (1974), D&D Basic Set (1977, 1981, 1983), MC1 – Monstrous Compendium Volume One (1989), Dungeons & Dragons Rules Cyclopedia (1991), Monstrous Manual (1993), Monster Manual (2000), Monster Manual v.3.5 (2003), Monster Manual v.5 (2014), Monster Manual v.5.5 (2025)		Magically animated corpses, undead creatures under the command of the evil magic-users or clerics who animated them. Based on the zombie from folklore as well as more contemporary entertainment.

== TSR 2012 – Fiend Folio (1981) ==
The Fiend Folio: Tome of Creatures Malevolent and Benign was the second monster book for the first edition of Advanced Dungeons & Dragons, published in 1981. While the Monster Manual consisted primarily of monsters previously published in D&D books edited by Gary Gygax, the Fiend Folio consisted mostly of monsters submitted to White Dwarf's "Fiend Factory" column. Don Turnbull, later Managing Director of TSR UK, was the editor for the "Fiend Factory" column, as well as the Fiend Folio, which was billed as "the first major British contribution to the Advanced Dungeons & Dragons game system." The monsters in this book are presented in the same format as those in the previous Monster Manual work, and most featured illustrations of the monsters. Also, there are full-page black and white illustrations of various monsters throughout the book. The book contains a foreword on pages 3–4, an alphabetical table of contents on page 5, explanatory notes on pages 6–7, descriptions of the monsters on pages 8–97, a treasure chart on page 99, additional tables and charts for all the monsters in both the Monster Manual and Fiend Folio on pages 100–119, an index of major listings (including the contributor for each monster) on pages 120–124, with an epilogue on page 124.

ISBN 0-935696-21-0

Creature	Other Appearances	Variants	Description
Aarakocra	MC2 – Monstrous Compendium Volume Two (1989), Monstrous Manual (1993), Dark Sun Monstrous Compendium Appendix II (1995) (Athasian Aarakocra), Polyhedron #121 (1996) (Malatran Aarakocra), Monsters of Faerûn (2001)		Intelligent winged humanoids with an avian appearance. Their wings are described as being more along the lines of pterodactyls or bats than those found on birds or angels, and they are depicted as possessing two pairs of hands—one pair as part of their wings, while the other pair are hidden behind the talons on their feet. In 2020, Comic Book Resources counted the aarakocra as # 9 on the list of "10 Powerful Monster Species That You Should Play As", stating that "As long as they're not wearing heavy or medium armor you have a flying sniper, essentially."
Achaierai	MC14 – Monstrous Compendium Fiend Folio Appendix (1992), Planes of Law (1995), Monster Manual (2000), Monster Manual v.3.5 (2003), D&D Miniatures: Aberrations set #26 (2004)		Achaierai are depicted as large flightless birds—reminiscent of the kiwi (albeit considerably larger) —with four legs and a raptor-like beak. CJ Miozzi included the achaierai on The Escapist's list of "The Dumbest Dungeons & Dragons Monsters Ever (And How To Use Them)".
Adherer	White Dwarf #7 (June/July 1978) (as "Gluey"), MC14 – Monstrous Compendium Fiend Folio Appendix (1992)		While the adherer is described as having a mummy-like appearance, it is not technically undead. Instead it is a humanoid covered with loose folds of white skin that is said to secrete an adhesive substance which causes weapons employed against it to be reduced in effectiveness and to stick to its body.
Aleax	Planescape Campaign Setting (1994), Book of Exalted Deeds (2003)		An aleax in Dungeons & Dragons is an avatar of certain gods sent as vengeance for angering the deity. It is only visible to the victim, and has identical characteristics to the target—the same armour, skills and weapons. If the target is defeated, the Fiend Folio states that the victim will be raised from the dead, minus all their treasure and half of their experience. If the target wins, he or she is taken to serve the deity for a year and a day.
Algoid	MC14 – Monstrous Compendium Fiend Folio Appendix (1992)		A colony of algae that appears in the form of a green humanoid.
Al-mi'raj	MC14 – Monstrous Compendium Fiend Folio Appendix (1992)		The al-mi'raj is depicted as a cross between a rabbit and a unicorn—in effect, it is a large hare with a horn protruding from its forehead. Based on Al-mi'raj "in Islamic poetry, a yellow hare with a single black horn on its head." Counted among the saddest, lamest creatures in Fiend Folio by artist Sean McCarthy, a hybrid creature with physiology resulting from maladaptation rather than evil.
Apparition	D&D Companion Rules (1984) (as "Phantom, Apparition"), Dungeons & Dragons Rules Cyclopedia (1991) (as "Phantom, Apparition"), Monstrous Compendium Fiend Folio Appendix (1992), Guide to the Ethereal Plane (1998).		These are described as being undead creatures that lack the ability to interact with the physical world. Instead they attack by suggestion, fooling victims into believing that they are being strangled, even though the Apparition itself is unable to directly inflict physical damage. The apparition appeared in the Tome of Horrors (2002) from Necromancer Games.
Assassin bug	White Dwarf #12 (1979), Monstrous Manual (1993)		Assassin bugs are described as four-legged insects that reproduce by implanting eggs into living human hosts.
Astral searcher	Planescape Campaign Setting (1994)		The Fiend Folio describes Astral Searchers as creatures that come into existence as a result of certain intense or traumatic events. They seek to possess their victims, and, if successful, the person cannot be saved—even if the Astral Searcher is removed. They are not considered to be undead.
Babbler	Tome of Horrors (2002)		The babbler is a variation on the lizard man—an intelligent reptile reminiscent of a small dinosaur, that lives in marshes and likes to devour human flesh.
Bat, giant	D&D Basic Set (1981), D&D Basic Set (1983), MC1 – Monstrous Compendium Volume One (1989), Dungeons & Dragons Rules Cyclopedia (1991), Monstrous Manual (1993)		The giant bat in the Fiend Folio is exactly what its name would suggest—a giant form of bat with a 6' wingspan. White Dwarf reviewer Jamie Thomson commented on the giant bat, noting that it "seems an obvious choice for D&D.
Berbalang	White Dwarf #11 (1979), Best of White Dwarf Scenarios (1980), MC3 – Monstrous Compendium Volume Three: Forgotten Realms Appendix (1989), A Guide to the Astral Plane (1996), 4th Edition Monster Manual (2008)		A gargoyle-like creature, the Berbalang is described as a bipedal creature with leathery skin and bat-like wings. It spends most of its life in a state of hibernation while its spirit astral travels. For a few days each month, it sends a projection out into the world to kill and feed.
Blindheim	Monstrous Compendium Annual Volume Four (1998), Dragon #339 (2006)		A frog-like creature of low intelligence, the blindheim has eyes that emit beams of light. When attacking a victim in its subterranean realm, it opens its eyes, temporarily blinding the target.
Blood hawk	White Dwarf #2 (1977), Best of White Dwarf Scenarios (1980), Fiend Folio (2003)		The blood hawk is, as the name would suggest, a hawk. It is roughly the same size as a normal hawk, but is described as having a "razor sharp beak" and strong talons, with eagle-like wings.
Bloodworm, giant	White Dwarf #12 (1979), Monstrous Manual (1993)		Giant bloodworms are, according to the Fiend Folio, huge (20' long) worms that live in underground pools. While not described as particularly aggressive, when attacking they attach themselves to their victim and drain their blood in a leech-like manner.
Bonesnapper	White Dwarf #6 (1978), MC5 – Monstrous Compendium Greyhawk Appendix (1990)		Small carnivorous dinosaurs (5' in height) that decorate their lairs with human jawbones. In the Fiend Folio, the bonesnapper is depicted as being similar in shape to the carnosauria.
Booka	MC5 – Monstrous Compendium Greyhawk Appendix (1990)		Booka are described as being small, good creatures who are similar to traditional depictions of faeries. They often help around houses, but can cause mischief when upset.
Bullywug	MC2 – Monstrous Compendium Volume Two (1989), The Knight of Newts (1993) (appearing in this Basic D&D module as "Newt"), Monstrous Manual (1993) (including Advanced Bullywug), Living Greyhawk Journal #2 (2000) (Bullywug Savant), Monsters of Faerûn (2001), D&D Miniatures: Deathknell set #48 (2005) (Bullywug Thug)		Bullywugs are described as humanoids with the head of frogs. They are usually shorter than a human, with leathery skin and webbed digits. They are very good jumpers, and can jump roughly 30 feet forward and 15 feet vertically. They inhabit temperate to tropical swamps.
Bunyip	MC3 – Monstrous Compendium Volume Three: Forgotten Realms Appendix (1989), Monstrous Compendium Annual Volume Three (1996)		The bunyip is loosely based on the creature from Australian mythology. They live in lakes, marshes and some rivers, and are mostly playful rather than dangerous, but they do occasionally attack smaller creatures such as dwarves.
Carbuncle	White Dwarf #8 (1978), Best of White Dwarf Scenarios (1980), Tome of Horrors (2002)		Carbuncles are described as being small, armadillo-like creatures with a large ruby stuck into its head. They typically infiltrate groups of adventurers and spread dissent through psychic powers.
Caryatid column	WGR1 – Greyhawk Ruins (1990), Monstrous Manual (1993), Fiend Folio (2003)		The Fiend Folio describes the caryatid column as being very similar to a golem. As with other golems, the caryatid column is an artificial construct animated by magic. They appear to players as columns with fine carving suggesting the shape of a woman holding a sword. When activated, (typically by an event trigger), they transform into "young maidens" and do battle, returning to their original position and state once the threat has been dispatched.
Caterwaul	MC14 – Monstrous Compendium Fiend Folio Appendix (1991)		The caterwaul is a bipedal feline, noted for its ability to climb, hide in shadows and to move silently. When attacking, it is said to emit a high pitched screech that will cause damage to anyone nearby.
Cifal	Polyhedron #145 (2000)		Cifals are described as being a large colony of insects which has massed together into a vaguely bipedal form.
Clubnek	Tome of Horrors (2002)		Large flightless birds, described as "mutated ostriches", that attack with their beaks and claws.
Coffer corpse	White Dwarf #8 (1978), MC14 – Monstrous Compendium Fiend Folio Appendix (1992), Monstrous Compendium Annual Volume Three (1996)		Undead zombies derived from corpses that have failed to be fully disposed of, such as funeral barges which have become stranded.
Crabman	MC14 – Monstrous Compendium Fiend Folio Appendix (1992), Monstrous Manual (1993), Fiend Folio (2003) (as "Yurian")		The crabman is a large monstrous humanoid. Crabmen are simple hunter-gatherers and generally peaceful. A crabman is usually neutral and generally lives near warm sea coasts.
Crypt thing	MC5 – Monstrous Compendium Greyhawk Appendix (1990), Monstrous Manual (1993), Living Greyhawk Journal #5 (2002), Fiend Folio (2003)		Crypt things are depicted as being undead skeletons that wear brown robes, found within their private lairs. When attacked they will attempt to teleport their attackers to a random location.
Dakon	Dragon #187 "The Ecology of the Dakon" (1992), Monstrous Manual (1993), Living Greyhawk Journal #5 (2002)		Dakons are described as shaggy, intelligent apes with a reasonable grasp of language, that live in jungle settings. A dakon is depicted as being light brown in color, with green eyes and black hands.
Dark creeper	MC14 – Monstrous Compendium Fiend Folio Appendix (1992), Fiend Folio (2003), D&D Miniatures: Underdark set #42 (2005)		Dark Creepers are small humanoids (about 4' in height) that are described as preferring to dwell underground due to their hatred of light. They operate like thieves, extinguishing light sources and stealing small magical items. When killed, the Fiend Folio states that they spontaneously burst into flame.
Dark stalker			
Death dog			White Dwarf reviewer Jamie Thomson commented on the death dog, which is "rumored to be a descendant of Cerberus".
Death knight			A "powerful undead warrior", Shannon Applecline considered this creature created by Charles Stross one of the game's especially notable monsters.
Demon			Lolth, the Demon Queen of Spiders (a lesser goddess), is described here
Denzelian			White Dwarf reviewer Jamie Thomson commented on Lolth, as a giant spider-creature "which often appears on fantasy literature".
Devil			The Styx devil, a greater devil, is described here
Devil dog	White Dwarf #11 (Feb/March 1979)		
Dire corby			Black avian humanoid species descended from birds, J.R. Zambrano from Bell of Lost Souls compared it to "a really buff Kenku".
Disenchanter	White Dwarf #6 (April/May 1978)		
Doombat	White Dwarf #13 (June/July 1979)		
Dragon, Oriental		Li Lung (Earth Dragon), Lung Wang (Sea Dragon), Pan Lung (Coiled Dragon), Shen Lung (Spirit Dragon), T'ien Lung (Celestial Dragon), and Yu Lung (Carp Dragon).	Dragon contributor Alan Zumwait was pleased by the inclusion of the neutral Oriental dragons, but felt that their descriptions were inferior to those of the dragons in the Monster Manual.
Dragonfish			
Dune stalker	White Dwarf #2 (Aug/Sept 1977)		
Elemental Princes of Evil		Cryonax (Prince of Evil Cold Creatures), Imix (Prince of Evil Fire Creatures), Ogrémoch (Prince of Evil Earth Creatures), Olhydra (Princess of Evil Water Creatures), and Yan-C-Bin (Prince of Evil Aerial Creatures).	Bosses on their respective planes, Ed Greenwood considered the Elemental Princes of Evil "worthy additions to any campaign".
Elf, Drow (dark elf)			Ed Greenwood noted that the previously published drow were "expected attractions, but good to see nonetheless." Made famous R. A. Salvatore's Drizzt novels, these dark elves from the game influenced subsequent works of fantasy. Drow have a gender-based caste system that says "a great deal about attitudes towards gender roles in the real world". Bleeding Cool reviewer Gavin Sheehan considered "the schism between drow and other elves" one "of the most contentious relationships in the multiverse" of D&D. A drider is a "monster that looks like a centaur only with the bottom half of a spider instead of a horse."
Enveloper			
Ettercap			
Eye killer	The eye killer first appeared in White Dwarf #7 (June 1978). The eye killer appeared in the original first edition Fiend Folio (1981). The eye killer appeared in the Tome of Horrors (2002) from Necromancer Games.		An eye killer is a creature with a bat-like upper torso on the body of a large snake. Its stunted wings cannot support flight. Its upper body is a dark grey-green while the lower part is a medium green flecked with dully yellow. Its eyes are disproportionately large and apparently lidless. An eye killer dwells in dark places underground. An eye killer will attack creatures by crushing them with its coils, but if an approaching party carries lanterns or torches, the eye killer can use its Death Stare once per day. Its eyes gather the illumination falling on them, amplifying it enormously, and project it back at the light-bearer as a powerful, narrow ray of intense light that kills instantly.
Eye of fear and flame			
Firedrake			
Firenewt			
Fire snake			
Firetoad			
Flail snail	Monstrous Compendium Greyhawk Appendix (1990), Dragon #258 (April 1999) in "The Ecologies of the Flail Snail: The Price of Flailure", Tome of Horrors (2002) p. 138 from Necromancer Games, Misfit Monsters Redeemed (2010) p. 28-33 from Paizo Publishing		The flail snail is an enormous gastropod with six tentacles on its head, each tipped with a mace-like club. Shannon Applecline considered the flail snail one of the "silly monsters" of the game. CJ Miozzi included the flail snail on The Escapist's list of "The Dumbest Dungeons & Dragons Monsters Ever (And How To Use Them)". Paste magazine reviewer Cameron Kunzelmann found the flail snail an inventive and "super weird" monster beyond the game's staples.
Flind			
Flumph			Ranked among the weakest monsters in the game by Scott Baird from Screen Rant: It only attacks with a stinking liquid, and helpless when turned on its back. Shannon Applecline considered "the much-satirized flumph" one of the silly monsters introduced in Fiend Folio.
Forlarren			
Frost man			The frost man appeared on Geek.com's list of "The most underrated monsters of Advanced Dungeons & Dragons".
Galltrit			
Gambado			
Garbug		Black and Violet	
Giant		Fog and Mountain	
Giant strider			
Gibberling			Humanoid "hairy screaming monsters that attack in large groups and seek to devour everything in their path", "little more than mindless beasts". Screen Rant reviewer Scott Baird ranked them among the weakest monsters in the game, which have a scary description, but lack the stats to back up this impression.
Githyanki	White Dwarf #12 (April/May 1979)		Xenophobic humanoids with gaunt stature, leathery yellow skin and fangs. Inhabitants of the Astral Plane, and ancient enemies of the githzerai, githyanki are considered to "boast some excellent twists" as non-player characters, but "little more than dextrous, not to mention ugly, egg layers" as PCs by reviewer Trenton Webb Introduced by Charles Stross in White Dwarf No. 12, and officially included in the game in Fiend Folio (1981) and featured on its cover. The name was borrowed the name from a fictional race in George R. R. Martin's Dying of the Light. The githyanki/illithid relationship was inspired by Larry Niven's World of Ptavvs. The githyanki were voted among the top ten best monsters from that White Dwarf's "Fiend Factory" column. Shannon Applecline considered the githyanki one of the game's especially notable monsters. Scott Baird of the website TheGamer commented on the nature of the relationship of the githyanki to the mind flayers, to whom they were formerly enslaved: "Despite their wicked reputation, the Githyanki have an important role to play in protecting the Prime Material Plane. The Githyanki despise Mind Flayers and their armies might be the only thing holding them back. The trailer for Baldur's Gate 3 shows just how scary a single Mind Flayer ship can be, and that could happen a thousand times over if the Githyanki aren't around." ComicBook.com contributor Christian Hoffer considered "the conflict between the otherworldly githzerai and githyanki" one "of the great conflicts that make up the D&D multiverse", and praised the expanded lore presented in Mordenkainen's Tome of Foes as "certainly useful as both inspiration and as research material for building a D&D campaign."
Githzerai			Designed by Charles Stross, these humanoids are the ancient and fervent enemies of mind flayers, to whom they were formerly enslaved, and the githyanki; they are based on the plane of Limbo. A playable species in the Planescape campaign setting, reviewer Johnny L. Wilson found them a new take on the niche usually occupied by elves. Shannon Applecline considered the githzerai one of the game's especially notable monsters, while ComicBook.com contributor Christian Hoffer counted "the conflict between the otherworldly githzerai and githyanki" among "the great conflicts that make up the D&D multiverse", and praised the expanded lore presented in Mordenkainen's Tome of Foes as "certainly useful as both inspiration and as research material for building a D&D campaign."
Goldbug			
Gorbel	Tome of Horrors (2002) Monstrous Compendium Fiend Folio Appendix 2nd edition (1992). Monstrous Manual (1993).		A red globe of translucent, thin rubbery material, with six tiny red eyes on short, retractable eyestalks equally spaced around the top of its spherical body, and two short, clawed legs on its underside. When its hide is pierced or slashed, its balloon-like body bursts, releasing a cloud of pyrophoric gas which explodes. A gorbel can also explode if damaged by magic spells, or if it is within the blast range of another exploding gorbel.
Gorilla bear	Tome of Horrors (2002)		A creature with the head, body and legs of a gorilla with the sharp teeth and powerful arms of a bear. A gorilla bear has a grizzly bear's aggressive disposition and a cave bear's carnivorous tendencies.
Grell	White Dwarf #12 (April/May 1979)		"terrifying beaked, tentacled monsters that populate the realm of Underdark". Tyler Linn of Cracked.com listed the grell among the "15 Most Idiotic Monsters In Dungeons & Dragons History" and found that it's movement by floating contributed to it looking ridiculous.
Grimlock			
Gryph			
Guardian daemon			
Guardian familiar	White Dwarf #10 (Dec/Jan 1978/9) (as "Familiar")		
Hellcat			
Hoar fox			
Hook horror	White Dwarf #12 (April/May 1979)		The hook horror is described as an aberration that stands about nine feet tall and weighs almost 350 pounds . It has a mottled grey exoskeleton, which is extremely thick and dense, and as difficult to breach as metal armor. Its front limbs end in 12-inch-long razor-sharp, blade-like hooks. These hooks are its primary method of combat. Its legs are similar to those of a bird, and its head is shaped like that of a vulture, including the hooked beak. Its eyes, however, are multifaceted like that of an insect. The hook horror was first published in White Dwarf #12 (April–May 1979), and was originally submitted by Ian Livingstone. It was voted among the top ten monsters from the magazine's "Fiend Factory" column and reprinted in Best of White Dwarf Articles (1980). Ed Greenwood, in his review of the Fiend Folio for Dragon magazine, considered the hook horror as one of the creatures with "strange appearances and little else; there is no depth to their listings" and that it was one of the creatures which "seem incomplete".
Hornet, giant			
Hound of ill omen	The hound of ill omen first appeared in the original first edition Fiend Folio (1981). The hound of ill omen appeared in second edition in Monstrous Compendium Annual Volume Three (1996).		A hound of ill omen is sent by one of the gods as a curse to a misbehaving follower.
Huecuva			
Ice lizard	The ice lizard first appeared in the original first edition Fiend Folio (1981). The ice lizard appeared in the second edition in the Monstrous Compendium Fiend Folio Appendix (1992). The ice drake appeared under the "drake" heading in the Tome of Horrors (2002) from Necromancer Games.		An ice lizard is a snow-white lizard which appears similarly to a 3-foot long white dragon in its natural form, and has the ability to change its form into that of a full-sized white dragon.
Imorph	White Dwarf #9 (Oct/Nov 1978)		
Iron cobra			
Jaculi			
Jermlaine	Descent into the Depths of the Earth (1978), Monstrous Compendium Volume Two (1989), Monstrous Manual (1993) under the "gremlin" entry, Dragon #262 (August 1999)., third edition Monster Manual II (2002)		
Kamadan			
Kelpie			
Kenku			Crow-like humanoids with a tendency for thievery, loosely based on the Japanese tengu.
Khargra			The khargra is a type of extraplanar creature. The khargra first appeared in the original first edition Fiend Folio (1981).
Killmoulis			
Kuo-toa			"evil fish-men" Ed Greenwood noted that the previously published drow and kuo-toa were "expected attractions, but good to see nonetheless."
Lamia noble			
Lava children			
Lizard king			
Magnesium spirit			
Mantari			
Meazel			
Meenlock			
Mephit	White Dwarf #13 (June/July 1979) (as "imp": "fire imp", "molten imp", "smoke imp" and "steam imp")	Fire, lava, smoke, and steam	First published in White Dwarf #13 (June/July 1979) under the names of fire imp, molten imp, smoke imp and steam imp, respectively (not including ice and mist mephits), originally submitted by M. Stollery. These "imps" were voted among the top ten monsters from the magazine's "Fiend Factory" column in 1980.
Mezzodaemon			
Mite	White Dwarf #6 (April/May 1978)		
Necrophidius	White Dwarf #7 (June/July 1978)		Undead consisting of a humanoid skull and giant snake vertebrae, "looks like the skeleton of a Guardian Naga", with venomenous bite and mesmerizing powers; first published in White Dwarf #7 (June/July 1978), submitted by Simon Tilbrook. In 1980 it was voted the best monster from the magazine's "Fiend Factory" column.
Needleman	White Dwarf #6 (April/May 1978)		First published in White Dwarf #6 (April 1978), submitted by Trevor Graver. It was voted among the top ten monsters from the magazine's "Fiend Factory" column and reprinted in Best of White Dwarf Articles (1980).
Nilbog	White Dwarf #6 (April/May 1978)		
Nonafel			
Norker			
Nycadaemon			
Ogrillon			
Osquip			
Penanggalan			
Pernicon			
Phantom stalker			
Poltergeist			
Protein polymorph			
Quaggoth	The quaggoth first appeared in first edition in the original Fiend Folio (1981).		The quaggoth is a primitive monstrous humanoid that lives underground, and is frequently enslaved by other more advanced races.
Quipper			
Qullan			
Retriever			
Revenant	The revenant first appeared in first edition in the original Fiend Folio (1981). It appeared in second edition for the Forgotten Realms setting in the Monstrous Compendium Forgotten Realms Appendix (1989), and reprinted in the Monstrous Manual (1993). It appeared in third edition for the Forgotten Realms setting as a template in Monsters of Faerûn (2001), and in the adventure City of the Spider Queen (2002). It was added as a fully playable character race for 4th edition in Dragon #376 (2009).		The revenant is a powerful undead creature that has a strong physical resemblance to a zombie, a far less powerful undead creature.
Rothé			
Sandman	White Dwarf #10 (Dec/Jan 1978/9)		The Fiend Folio's illustration of the sandman was used by Richard Garfield in the prototype of the Doppleganger card during the development of his Magic: The Gathering card game.
Scarecrow			
Screaming devilkin	Tome of Horrors (2002) from Necromancer Games.		A small creature that resembles a mephit in appearance. It is three feet tall, with a long, muscular barbed tail and leathery wings with a 5-foot span. Its legs and arms are disproportionately small and useless for movement or combat. It always attacks and never willingly breaks off a fight, striking with its cruelly barbed tail, and has a painful howling scream which it uses continuously in the presence of other beings that makes other vocalization inaudible.
Shadow demon			
Sheet ghoul	White Dwarf #11 (Feb/March 1979)		
Sheet phantom	White Dwarf #11 (Feb/March 1979)		
Shocker			
Skeleton warrior			Reviewer Jamie Thomson found the skeleton warriors "beings similar to Tolkien's ringwraiths".
Skulk			
Slaad		blue slaad; death slaad (the Lesser Masters); green slaad; grey slaad (the Executioners); red slaad; Ssendam, Lord of the Insane (slaad lord); and Ygorl, Lord of Entropy (slaad lord).	Ed Greenwood considered the slaad "worthy additions to any campaign". GameSpy author Allan Rausch described the slaadi as "remorseless reptilian killing machines", but "For many years, slaad were a joke -- because of their artwork", which showed them as "six-foot tall carnivorous frogs". With the Planescape setting they "were reinterpreted artistically to be less frog-like and much more fearsome". Shannon Applecline considered the githzerai one of the game's especially notable monsters.
Snyad			
Son of Kyuss			
Stunjelly			The Fiend Folio's illustration of the stunjelly was used by Richard Garfield for the prototype of the Animate Wall spell card during the development of his Magic: The Gathering game.
Sussurus	White Dwarf #9 (Oct/Nov 1978)		
Svirfneblin (deep gnome)			
Symbiotic jelly	White Dwarf #8 (Aug/Sept 1978) (as "Chaoticus Symbioticus")		
Tabaxi			Described as a "lithe feline" race and "cat person". In 2020, Comic Book Resources counted the tabaxi as # 4 on the list of "10 Powerful Monster Species That You Should Play As", stating that "a Tabaxi monk with Boots of Speed and a few other speed buffs can in theory cover anywhere between 320ft per round to 253,440ft per round. Your ability to do this and break the sound barrier in-game entirely depends on how much time and leniency the DM grants you though." Again referring to the 5th edition presentation, A.V. Club praised the tabaxi as an interesting player character choice, calling that they "view money as a mere tool to be used in finding the real treasure—a good story" a "great character trait," while Black Gate reviewer Howard Andrew Jones called them "perennially popular".
Tentamort			
Terithran			
Thoqqua (rockworm)			
Thork			
Throat leech	White Dwarf #6 (April/May 1978)	Appeared in second edition Advanced Dungeons & Dragons under the "leech" heading in the Monstrous Compendium Volume Two (1989), and in the Monstrous Manual (1993).	A throat leech is a small twig-sized creature found in pools, lakes, and streams. If swallowed, it stays in the creature's throat and sucks blood until it becomes fully distended, which causes the victim to choke.
Tiger fly			
Tirapheg	White Dwarf #11 (Feb/March 1979) (as "Lauren", "an anagram of 'unreal'")		
Trilloch			
Troll		giant troll, giant two-headed troll, ice troll, and spirit troll	
Tween	White Dwarf #8 (Aug/Sept 1978)		
Umpleby	White Dwarf #9 (Oct/Nov 1978)		Trenton Webb, in his review of Monstrous Compendium Annual Two for British RPG magazine Arcane, called the shambling umpleby "without a shadow of a doubt" the star of the book: "Effectively a Bigfoot whose wooly hair generates shocking levels of static electricity, these hulking eccentric simpletons will test any parties patience and ability to save against cuteness." Webb also added that even without the umpleby the book "would be a necessary resource for all mainstream refs. With the shaggy-haired one, though, it rapidly approaches the essential."
Urchin	White Dwarf #9 (Oct/Nov 1978)	black, green, red, silver, and yellow	First published in White Dwarf #9 (October/November 1978), submitted by Nick Louth. It was voted among the top ten monsters from the magazine's "Fiend Factory" column and reprinted in Best of White Dwarf Articles (1980). The urchin's illustration from Monster Manual II (1983) was used by Richard Garfield for the "most notorious of the prototype cards", Starburst, during the development of his Magic: The Gathering game.
Vision			
Vodyanoi			
Volt	White Dwarf #7 (June/July 1978)		First published in White Dwarf #7 (June/July 1978), originally submitted by Jonathan Jones. The volt was voted among the top ten monsters from the magazine's "Fiend Factory" column in 1980.
Vortex			
Whipweed			
Witherstench	White Dwarf #11 (Feb/March 1979)		
Witherweed	White Dwarf #7 (June/July 1978)		
Xill			
Xvart	White Dwarf #9 (Oct/Nov 1978) (as "Svart")		First published in White Dwarf #9 (October/November 1978) under the name of "svart", submitted by Cricky Hitchcock and "taken from The Weirdstone of Brisingamon by Alan Garner", who in turn took inspiration from the Norse myth of the svartálfar. It was voted among the top ten monsters from the magazine's "Fiend Factory" column and reprinted in Best of White Dwarf Articles (1980). Forgotten Realms author Ed Greenwood considered xvarts to be redundant creatures with no unique or interesting characteristics.
Yellow musk creeper			Ben Woodard found it an expression of the "seemingly endless morphology of fungal creep and toxicological capacity" within the game. The Fiend Folio's illustration of the yellow musk creeper was used by Richard Garfield for the prototype of the Regrowth spell card during the development of his Magic: The Gathering game.
Zombie, yellow musk			

== Monster Cards (1982) ==
Four sets of "monster cards" were released in 1982; each card contained the stats and description of a single monster. They were mostly reprints from the Monster Manual, but three monsters in each set were original, and were reprinted in the Monster Manual II the next year.

=== TSR8009 - Set 1 ===
Creature	Other Appearances	Variants	Description
Ankhegs	Monster Manual (1977)		
Barbed Devil	Monster Manual (1977)		
Centaur	Monster Manual (1977)		
Constrictor Snake	Monster Manual (1977)		
Displacer Beast	Monster Manual (1977)		
Frost Giant	Monster Manual (1977)		
Ghoul	Monster Manual (1977)		
Giant Weasel	Monster Manual (1977)		
Grippli	Monster Manual II (1983)		"humanoid tree-frogs" forming "a society of "uncommonly intelligent" humanoid amphibians who were quick to adapt and acquire new skills"; J.R. Zambrano thought of them as a good choice to create a player character race.
Kobold	Monster Manual (1977)		
Lizard Man	Monster Manual (1977)		A player character race in some settings. Reviewer Chris Gigoux described them by saying "Lizard Men aren't bad, [...] they're just a simple folks, struggling to survive." In 2020, Comic Book Resources counted the lizardfolk as # 1 on the list of "10 Powerful Monster Species That You Should Play As", stating that "Along with the ability to manufacture their own weapons from the natural environment around them, they provide an excellent role-playing experience and have some pretty awesome tricks up their sleeve." An image of a lizard man by Greg Bell functioned as the logo in the early phase of TSR Hobbies, while "the bloodied bodies of lizard men" overcome by a group of adventurers featured on the cover of the 1st edition Player's Handbook, considered "arguably the most iconic piece of art in all of RPGdom" by Reactor magazine commentator Saladin Ahmed.
Mihstu	Monster Manual II (1983)		
Neo-Otyugh	Monster Manual (1977)		
Red Dragon	Dungeons & Dragons set (1974), D&D Basic Set (1977, 1981, 1983), Monster Manual (1977), D&D Companion Rules (1984), Dragon #134 "The Ecology of the Red Dragon" (1988), Dungeons & Dragons Rules Cyclopedia (1991), Monstrous Manual (1993), Monster Manual (2000), Monster Manual v.3.5 (2003), D&D Miniatures: Dragoneye set #55 (2004), D&D Miniatures: Giants of Legend set #71 (2004), D&D Icons: Colossal Red Dragon (2006)		
Sahuagin	Monster Manual (1977)		
Salamander	Monster Manual (1977)		
Treant	Monster Manual (1977)		
Triceratops	Monster Manual (1977)		
Werewolf	Monster Manual (1977)		
Zorbo	Monster Manual II (1983)		

=== TSR8010 - Set 2 ===
Creature	Other Appearances	Variants	Description
Galeb Duhr	Monster Manual II (1983)		
Gelatinous Cube	Monster Manual (1977)		"D&D's large variety of monstrous oozes and slimes took their original inspiration from Irvin S. Yeathworth Jr's The Blob" movie. In the artificial dungeon environment of the game, they function as a "clean up crew". The gelatinous cube, "a living mound of gelatinous jelly", was considered especially suited for that role, as it fit exactly in the standard grid for tactical combat. Considered an "iconic monster".
Giant Scorpion	Monster Manual (1977)		
Goblin	Monster Manual (1977)		
Gold Dragon	Monster Manual (1977)		
Hill Dwarf	Monster Manual (1977)		
Hill Giant	Monster Manual (1977)		
Hippogriff	Monster Manual (1977)		
Ixitxachitl	Monster Manual (1977)		
Land Urchin	Monster Manual II (1983)		
Roper	Monster Manual (1977)		
Sabertooth Tiger	Monster Manual (1977)		
Satyr	Monster Manual (1977)		
Spectre	Monster Manual (1977)		
Stone Golem	Monster Manual (1977)		
Thri-kreen	Monster Manual II (1983)		Anthropomorphic preying mantis
Troglodyte	Monster Manual (1977)		Based on the stock character of the primitive caveman, Gary Gygax portrayed the troglodyte in the game as more monstrous, with chaotic and evil behaviour, offensive smell and lizard-like characteristics. The troglodyte was among the monsters featured as trading cards on the back of Amurol Products candy figure boxes.
Type V Demon	Monster Manual (1977)		
Tyrannosaurus Rex	Monster Manual (1977)		
Umber Hulk	Monster Manual (1977)		Subterranean predators with iron-like claws that enable them to burrow through solid stone, and their eyes cause a dangerous confusion in opponents. Present in the game since the earliest edition, and considered "a classic D&D monsters" by academics Greg Gillespie and Darren Crouse.

=== TSR8011 - Set 3 ===
Creature	Other Appearances	Variants	Description
Androsphinx	Monster Manual (1977)		
Blink Dog	Monster Manual (1977)		
Carnivorous Ape	Monster Manual (1977)		
Carrion Crawler	Monster Manual (1977)		A worm-like cephalopod that scavenges subterranean areas, feeding primarily upon carrion, whose tentacles paralyze creatures. The carrion crawler was included in the short list of monsters which were included in the core product identity and not protected from use by other companies in the System Reference Document.
Efreeti	Monster Manual (1977)		
Ettin	Monster Manual (1977)		
Giant Slug	Monster Manual (1977)		
Gnoll	Monster Manual (1977)		
Grey Elf	Monster Manual (1977)		
Jaguar	Monster Manual (1977)		
Locathah	Monster Manual (1977)		
Mummy	Monster Manual (1977)		Based on the creature from Gothic fiction and appearances in more contemporary entertainment, a typical denizen of the Ravenloft setting. In his review of the Monster Manual in the British magazine White Dwarf #8 (August/September 1978), Don Turnbull noted that the mummy was revised from its previous statistics, and could now cause paralysis on sight (as a result of fear).
Nycadaemon	Fiend Folio (1981)		
Peryton	Monster Manual (1977)		
Sea Wolf	Monster Manual II (1983)		
Silver Dragon	Monster Manual (1977)		
Sylph	Monster Manual (1977)		
Tunnel Worm	Monster Manual II (1983)		
Wemic	Monster Manual II (1983)		A lion-centaur
Will O'wisp	Monster Manual (1977)		

=== TSR8012 - Set 4 ===
Creature	Other Appearances	Variants	Description
Axe Beak	Monster Manual (1977)		
Black Dragon	Monster Manual (1977)		
Bombardier Beetle	Monster Manual (1977)		
Bugbear	Monster Manual (1977)		
Dire wolf	Monster Manual (1977)		
Gorgon	Monster Manual (1977)		"iron plated bull", based on early modern bestiaries, with only the name being derived from the Classical counterpart.
Halfling	Monster Manual (1977)		
Hippocampus	Monster Manual (1977)		
Hybsil	Monster Manual II (1983)		A stag-centaur
Korred	Monster Manual II (1983)		
Leucrotta	Monster Manual (1977)		
Merman	Monster Manual (1977)		
Obliviax	Monster Manual II (1983)		
Rust Monster	Monster Manual (1977)		
Stone Giant	Monster Manual (1977)		
Succubus	Monster Manual (1977)		
Su-monster	Monster Manual (1977)		
Vampire	Monster Manual (1977)		
Weretiger	Monster Manual (1977)		
Wind Walker	Monster Manual (1977)		

== TSR 2016 – Monster Manual II (1983) ==
Monster Manual II was the third and final monster book for the first edition of Advanced Dungeons & Dragons, published in 1983, and has the largest page count of the three. As with the Monster Manual, this book was written primarily by Gary Gygax. While this book contains a number of monsters that previously appeared in limited circulation (such as in Dragon or in adventure modules), unlike the Monster Manual and Fiend Folio a large amount of its contents was entirely new at publication. The monsters in this book are presented in the same format as the Monster Manual and Fiend Folio. The book contains a preface on page 4, a section entitled "How To Use This Book" on pages 5–7, descriptions of the monsters on pages 8–132, random encounter tables on pages 133–155, and an index of all the monsters in the Monster Manual, Fiend Folio, and Monster Manual II on pages 156–160. Unlike the previous two books, this book does not contain an alphabetical listing of the monsters in the beginning of the book.

ISBN 0-88038-031-4

Creature	Other Appearances	Variants	Description
Aboleth			Ancient and powerful aquatic beings, aboleth in the game use their telepathic powers to influence and enslave mortals from behind the scenes in their bid to restore the position of dominance they lost through the rise of the gods themselves. SyFy Wire contributor Lisa Granshaw included them in her 2018 list of "The 9 Scariest, Most Unforgettable Monsters From Dungeons & Dragons" due to their impressive abilities and vengefulness.
Afanc (/ˈeɪfæŋk/ AY-fank)	afanc (gawwar samakat): City of Delights boxed set (1993); afanc and young afanc: Monstrous Compendium Annual Volume One (1994)		The afanc appeared in Tome of Horrors 3 in 2005, by Necromancer Games. The entry was updated for the Pathfinder game rules and appeared in The Tome of Horrors Complete in 2011, by Frog God Games.
Agathion			
Annis			
Ant lion	Monstrous Compendium Volume Two (1989), Monstrous Manual (1993), Sandstorm: Mastering the Perils of Fire and Sand (2005)		An ant lion is a huge insect that preys on other giant insects. Ant lions dig tapering pits in areas of sand and gravel, which can like cave or lair entrances; creatures entering these traps slip down the loose sides to land at the bottom, where the ant lion lurks. A line of lead miniatures from TSR included a set of a piscodaemon and an ant lion. The giant ant lion appeared in the Kingdoms of Kalamar books Forging Darkness (2001), and Midnight's Terror (2001), in the Tome of Horrors (2002) from Necromancer Games, and in Paizo Publishing's book Pathfinder Roleplaying Game Bestiary 3 (2011), on page 17.
Ascomoid			
Aspis	Slave Pits of the Undercity (1981), Greyhawk Monstrous Compendium Appendix (1990), Dragon #260 (June 1999).	Drone, Larva, and Cow	
Atomie			
Aurumvorax			Rob Bricken of io9 identified the aurumvorax as one of "The 12 Most Obnoxious Dungeons & Dragons Monsters", being "a particularly terrifying monster in that it eats that gold the players have so carefully accrued".
Azer			
Baku			
Banderlog			The Banderlog is a monstrous humanoid
Barghest			
Barkburr		Direburr	Barkburrs are spontaneously occurring animated plants that emerge within forests to serve as natural defenders. Their anatomy resembles that of limpets, featuring a tough, woody outer shell that provides strong protection, while concealing a much softer interior beneath.
Basidirond			
Basilisk, greater			Based on the creature from medieval bestiaries. In the original Monster Manual it is described as a reptilian monster whose gaze can turn creatures to stone.
Bat		Ordinary and Mobat	
Bat, fire			
Bear, northern (polar bear)			
Bee, giant		worker honeybee, soldier honeybee, and bumblebee	
Beetle, giant		death watch beetle and slicer beetle	
Behemoth			Monstrous relative of the hippopotamus.
Behir			
Bloodthorn			
Boalisk			
Bodak			
Boggart			
Boggle			
Boobrie			
Bookworm			
Bowler			
Buckawn			
Cat		Domestic and Wild	
Cat lord			
Catfish, giant			
Cave cricket			
Cave fisher			
Cave moray			Dangerous cave-dwelling slug-like creatures hiding in groups at rock surfaces.
Centipede		Huge and megalocentipede	
Cheetah			
Choke creeper			
Cloaker			An original creation for the game's artificial underground environment, this monster was designed as a trap for unwary player characters; it looks like a living cloak with teeth.
Cooshee (elven dog)			
Crane, giant			
Crysmal			
Crystal ooze			
Cyclopskin	Monstrous Manual (1993), Dragon #254 (December 1998), in the "Ecology of the Cyclopskin".		
Daemon		arcanadaemon (greater daemon), Charon (the Boatman of the Lower Planes), charonadaemon (lesser daemon), derghodaemon (lesser daemon), hydrodaemon (lesser daemon), Oinodaemon (Anthraxus), piscodaemon (lesser daemon), ultrodaemon (greater daemon), and yagnodaemon (lesser daemon)	
Dao			The dao were newly invented for the game altogether to fill the gap for the remaining element.
Death, crimson			
Demilich			Evolved beyond status as a lich. Creature of enormous powers, where only the skull remains. Tyler Linn of Cracked.com identified the demi-lich as one of "15 Idiotic Dungeons and Dragons Monsters" in 2009, stating: "Besides looking like a Pirates of the Caribbean alarm clock, the Demi-lich seems to possess no tactical advantages of any kind. It just kind of floats around, waiting for a party of heroes to smack it out of the air like a pinata. We suppose it could try to bite you, but the illustration above kind of makes it look like the jaw is fused in place. Man, now we just feel sorry for it." Ranked among the strongest in Screen Rant's "10 Most Powerful (And 10 Weakest) Monsters, Ranked", saying "You might think that a floating skull would be easy to smash to pieces, but you would be wrong, as demiliches are some of the most resilient creatures in the game."
Demodand		farastu (tarry) demodand, kelubar (slime) demodand, and shator (shaggy) demodand	
Demon			
-- Alu-demon (semi-demon)			
-- Babau (minor demon)			
-- Baphomet (demon lord)			
-- Bar-lgura (minor demon)			
-- Cambion (semi-demon)			
-- Chasme (minor demon)			
-- Dretch (minor demon)			
-- Fraz-Urb'luu (Prince of Deception)			
-- Graz'zt (demon prince)			CBR reviewer Daniel Colohan counted the abyssal lords among "the most feared enemies to encounter in any campaign". Among them, as an exception to the rule, Graz'zt appears humanoid rather than monstrous, and was ranked by Colohan number six among the "Top 10 Demon Lords Your Party Will Fear".
-- Kostchtchie (demon lord)			
-- Nabassu (major demon)			
-- Pazuzu (Prince of the Lower Aerial Kingdoms)			
-- Rutterkin (minor demon)			
Derro			
Deva		Astral, Monadic, and Movanic	
Devil			
-- Abishai (lesser devil)			
-- Amon (Duke of Hell)			
-- Bael (Duke of Hell)			
-- Bearded devil (lesser devil)			
-- Belial (Arch-devil)			
-- Glasya (Princess of Hell)			
-- Hutijin (Duke of Hell)			
-- Mammon (Arch-devil)			
-- Mephistopheles (Arch-devil)			
-- Moloch (Arch-devil)			
-- Nupperibo (least devil)			
-- Titivilus (Duke of Hell)			
-- Spined devil (least devil)			
Diakk			
Dinosaur		ankisaurus, camptosaurus, compsognathus, dacentrurus, deinonychus, dilophosaurus, dimetrodon, euparkeria, kentrosaurus, mamechisaurus, massopondylus, nothosaurus, ornitholestes, phororhacos, podokesaurus, giant pterosaur, struthiomimus, tanystropheus, and tennodontosaurus	Considered among the "standard repertoire of "Monsters"", and among the 12 most underrated monsters, "a creature as large and fearsome as a dragon but without all the hype".
Dracolisk			
Dragon			Powerful and intelligent, usually winged reptiles with magical abilities and breath weapon.
-- Cloud dragon			
-- Faerie dragon			
-- Mist dragon			
-- Shadow dragon			Reviewer Philippe Tessier found the shadow dragon a very dangerous foe in frontal assault.
Dragonfly, giant			
Dragon horse			
Dragonnel			
Drelb (haunting custodian)			
Drider			
Duergar			"the infamous dark dwarves", an "evil and avaricious" dwarven subrace with psionic powers. ComicBook.com contributor Christian Hoffer considered the struggle of the duergar with their dwarven cousins one "of the great conflicts that make up the D&D multiverse". Backstab reviewer Michaël Croitoriu found the duergar interesting as a player character option.
Dustdigger			
Eagle			
Eblis			
Eel, electric (marine)			
Elf		Grugach and valley elf	
Elfin cat			
Executioner's hood			The executioner's hood appeared on Geek.com's list of "The most underrated monsters of Advanced Dungeons & Dragons".
Falcon (hawk)		Small and Large	
Firefriend (giant firefly)			
Fly, giant		Bluebottle and Horsefly	
Foo creatures		Foo Dog and Foo Lion	
Forester's bane (snapper-saw)			
Formian (centaur-ant)		myrmarch, warrior, and worker	
Froghemoth			Paste magazine reviewer Cameron Kunzelmann found the froghemoth, a large amphibious predator, a straightforward monster without need for detailed background.
Galeb duhr			
Giant		fomorian, firbolg, and verbeeg	Bleeding Cool found the firbolg one "of the more distinctive race options in the D&D multiverse". In 2021, Comic Book Resources counted the firbolg as one of the "7 Underused Monster Races in Dungeons & Dragons", stating that "Firbolgs are a blend of strength and magic, making them useful for classes that blend the two. Firbolgs work well as Clerics and Druids, but they can also make for a good Ranger. Your harmony with nature will leave you definitely wanting to have a nature focus, but you'll also stand out in a crowd. As a naturally shy race, be sure to consider that when playing your character. Typically speaking, Firbolgs aren't aggressive."
Gibbering mouther	Dragon #160 (December 1990), Assassin Mountain (1993), Forgotten Realms Campaign Setting (1993), Monstrous Compendium Annual Volume One (1994), The Scarlet Brotherhood (1999), Monster Manual (2000), Epic Level Handbook (2002), Dungeon #85 (March 2001), Monster Manual (2003), Lords of Madness (2005), Monster Manual (2008)	Greater Gibbering Mouther, Ancient Gibbering Mouther, Gibbering Orb, Gibbering Abomination	An aberration that resembles a writhing mass of grey flesh covered with dozens of randomly placed eyes and mouths, of different sizes and shapes. A creature with many eyes and mouths. Witwer et al. found Erol Otus' early depiction "perversely beautiful", the artist's surrealist style very suited for this bizarre monster.
Gloomwing			
Goat			
Gorgimera			
Greenhag			
Grippli			
Grig			
Grim			
Grue, elemental		chagrin, harginn, ildriss, and verrdig	White Dwarf reviewer Megan C. Evans referred to the grues as "a collection of terrifying beasties from the Elemental Planes".
Hangman tree			
Haunt			
Hollyphant			In a review of Planescape Monstrous Compendium Appendix II for Arcane magazine, the reviewer described hollyphants as "mutant killer elephants with wings" and felt that they were introduced to "ensure that the planes maintain their very necessary bizarre flavour".
Hordling (hordes of Hades)			
Hybsil	Monster Cards Set 4 (1982)		
Jann			The jann is a type of genie. The jann first appeared in first edition Advanced Dungeons & Dragons in Dragon #66 (October 1982). A jann is the weakest of the genies, and is formed out of all four elements and must spend time on the Material Plane.
Jelly, mustard			
Kampfult	The kampfult first appeared in the first edition Monster Manual II (1983). The kampfult appeared in second edition for the Greyhawk setting in the Monstrous Compendium Greyhawk Appendix (1990).		In the Dungeons & Dragons fantasy role-playing game, the kampfult is a type of monster. A kampfult is a creature with a rope-like body that disguises itself among vines and creepers to trap unsuspecting prey with its coils of vine-like appendages that crush and strangle prey to death.
Kech			
Korred	Monster Cards Set 4 (1982)		Based on the korred from Breton mythology.
Kraken			
Lammasu, greater			
Lamprey, land			
Luck eater			
Lycanthrope		foxwoman, seawolf (greater), seawolf (lesser), and wereshark	Prior to 2E, weresharks were created by Dr. John Eric Holmes, based on a Hawaiian legend about the shark man.
Magman			
Mandragora			
Mantis, giant			
Mantrap			
Margoyle			
Marid	Dragon #66 (October 1982), The Lost Caverns of Tsojcanth (1982), Monstrous Compendium Volume Two (1989), Monstrous Manual (1993), Monstrous Compendium Al-Qadim Appendix (1992), Manual of the Planes (2001).	Noble Marid, Great Padisha of the Marids	A marid is a genie from the Elemental Plane of Water.
Mastiff, shadow			
Mihstu			
Miner			
Minimal			
Modron		monodrone (base modron), duodrone (base modron), tridrone (base modron), quadrone (base modron), pentadrone (base modron), decaton (hierarch modron), nonaton (hierarch modron), octon (hierarch modron), septon (hierarch modron), hexton (hierarch modron), quinton (hierarch modron), quarton (hierarch modron), tertian (hierarch modron), secundus (hierarch modron), and Primus (the One and the Prime)	In his review of the Planescape Campaign Setting boxed set, Gene Alloway mentioned the modrons as an example of "the old, tired and previously foolish" which the set "breathes new life and meaning into". Reviewer Scott Haring found that the "once-silly Modrons" from 1st edition AD&D were "given a new background and purpose that makes a lot more sense" in 2nd edition Planescape. Philippe Tessier praised the modrons as charming little critters.
Mold, russet			
Mongrelman			
Moon dog			
Muckdweller			
Mud-man			Screen Rant compiled a list of the game's "10 Most Powerful (And 10 Weakest) Monsters, Ranked" in 2018, calling this one of the weakest, saying "The mudmen are magically bound to their pool of mud, which means that the only way they can defeat an enemy is if they walk right into the middle of a dirty puddle. They will then have to score numerous hits in order to prevent the enemy from running away."
Myconid (fungus man)			A "race of [man-sized] sentient fungus creatures", "some of which pack a mean punch", and which have the "ability to spray poisons that can disable their foes".
Nereid			
Narwhale			
Obliviax (memory moss)	Monster Cards Set 4 (1982); Appeared in the Monstrous Compendium Volume Two (1989), and is reprinted in the Monstrous Manual (1993) under the "intelligent plant" heading. The obliviax appeared in Dragon #355 (May 2007), and in the Monster Manual 3 (2010).		A black moss with the magical ability to steal memories from intelligent creatures. The obliviax appeared on Geek.com's list of "The most underrated monsters of Advanced Dungeons & Dragons", because ingesting the moss can transfer the memories, an "interesting" concept which lends itself to "Christopher Nolan-esque adventures that will be both universally applauded and terribly confusing at the same time."
Ogre, aquatic (merrow)			
Oliphant	First appeared in adventure module The Land Beyond the Magic Mirror (1983); under the "elephant" entry in the Monstrous Compendium Volume One (1989), and reprinted in the Monstrous Manual (1993).		An apparent modern relative of the mastodon, with down-curving tusks; intelligent enough to be trained as an engine of destruction, attacking with its tusks and heavy forelegs, and can be used in war and for other military duties when armored with leather or scale and plate reinforcements, spikes projecting from head and forelegs, and bearing a castle-like houdas containing archers and pikemen.
Ophidian			
Opinicus			
Otter			
Owl			
Para-elemental		ice, smoke, magma, and ooze	
Pech			Derived from Pech (mythology)
Pedipalp		large, huge, and giant	
Phantom			Inspired by Gothic fiction, a typical denizen of the Ravenloft setting.
Phoenix			
Phycomid			
Planetar			
Pseudo-undead		Pseudoghoul, pseudoghast, pseudowight, pseudowraith, pseudospectre, pseudovampire	
Pudding, deadly			
Pyrolisk			
Quasi-elemental lightning		Ash quasi-elemental, the dust quasielemental, the salt quasielemental, and the vacuum quasielemental appeared under the "quasi-elemental, negative" heading, and the lightning quasielemental, the mineral quasielemental, the radiance quasielemental, and the steam quasielemental appeared under the "quasi-elemental, positive" heading.	Quasi-elementals are a fusion of one of the classic elements and either positive or negative energy.
Quickling			Small, intelligent, chaotic and speedy, it appeared on Geek.com's list of "The most underrated monsters of Advanced Dungeons & Dragons".
Quickwood (spy tree)			
Ram			
Rat		Ordinary and Vapor	
Raven (crow)		Ordinary, Huge, and Giant	
Retch plant			
Rock reptile			
Sandling			
Scorpion		Large and Huge	
Scum creeper			
Selkie			
Shade			For reviewer Philippe Tessier a monster in the spirit of Fiend Folio.
Shedu, greater			Lawful good winged equine with human-like head. Based on a creature from Mesopotamian mythology.
Sirine			
Skeleton, animal			
Skunk			
Slime creature			
Slime, olive			
Snake		Constrictor and Poisonous	
Solar			
Solifugid	The giant solifugid, the huge solifugid, and the large solifugid first appeared in the adventure module Queen of the Demonweb Pits (1980). The giant solifugid, the huge solifugid, and the large solifugid appeared in the original first edition Monster Manual II (1983). The huge solifugid and the large solifugid appeared in second edition Advanced Dungeons & Dragons for the Forgotten Realms setting in The Drow of the Underdark (1991).		A solifugid in Dungeons & Dragons is an arachnid creature with a powerful, hooked beak and 10 legs, the first pair ending in sucker-like clamps that it uses to catch and hold prey. Solifugids live in warm desert climates.
Spectator			
Spider, giant marine			
Spriggan			
Squealer			
Squirrel		Giant Black and Ordinary	
Squirrel, carnivorous flying			
Stegocentipede			Lawrence Schick described the stegocentipede as "a giant arthropod notable for its twin row of back plates (wow!)"
Stench kow	Monstrous Manual (1993), Polyhedron #133 (December 1998), Tome of Horror (2002), pp. 243–244 from Necromancer Games		Lawrence Schick described the stench kow as "a monstrous bison that smells real bad". CJ Miozzi included the stench kow on The Escapist's list of "The Dumbest Dungeons & Dragons Monsters Ever (And How To Use Them)".
Stone guardian			
Storoper			
Sundew, giant			
Swan			
Swanmay			Inspired by a character from Three Hearts and Three Lions by Poul Anderson rather than their mythological counterparts.
Swordfish			
Taer			
Tarrasque			Ranked among the strongest monsters in the game by Scott Baird from Screen Rant, "the ultimate challenge for many players". Rob Bricken from io9 named the tarrasque as the 10th most memorable D&D monster. The tarrasque appeared on the 2018 Screen Rant top list at No. 5 on " Dungeons & Dragons: The 20 Most Powerful Creatures, Ranked", and Scott Baird highlighted that "The tarrasque is currently the most powerful creature in the 5th edition of Dungeons & Dragons, where it is matched only by Tiamat in terms of its combat prowess."
Tasloi			
Termite, giant harvester			
Thessalhydra	Dragon #94 (February 1985), Monstrous Compendium Forgotten Realms Appendix (1989), Monstrous Compendium Annual Volume Three (1996), Dungeon #134 (May 2006)		Thessalmonsters, an original invention from the D&D game, were created rather than born, by hybridizing different creatures. A thessalhydra combines elements of a hydra and a lizard, but with its eight heads surrounding a great maw. It also features a thoothed tail, toxic breath, and regenerative ability. It appeared in the TV series Stranger Things. Reviewer matseric observed that the chances to overcome this creature only as a team hearkens back to Hercules and Iolaus working together to defeat the original hydra. In the lore of the game, these monsters were originally "designed" by a lich character named Thessalar. The other variants featured heads from other creatures derived from Greek mythology, the chimera, gorgon, cockatrice, respectively.
Thri-kreen (mantis warrior)			"Praying mantis man" with four arms and a poisonous bite, "invented by Paul Reiche III for the AD&D Monster Cards Set 2 (1982)", reviewer Mark Theurer considered them an "old personal favorite". With their additional limbs and specialized chatkcha and gythka weapons, thri-kreen were infamous as player characters optimized to do extreme amounts of damage. J.R. Zambrano found them "an interesting race" and preferred their "2nd Edition aesthetic" to others.
Thunder beast			
Thunderherder			
Time elemental			
Transposer			
Tri-flower frond			
Troll, marine (scrag)		fresh water and salt water	
Twilight bloom			
Urchin, land			
Ustilagor			
Vagabond			
Vargouille			
Vegepygmy	The vegepygmy was created by Gary Gygax. It first appeared in first edition Advanced Dungeons & Dragons in the adventure module Expedition to the Barrier Peaks (1980), and was reprinted in the original Monster Manual II (1983).		A vegepygmy is created when a humanoid is slain by russet mold, the victim's body transforming into a new creature. Although made of plant material, the vegepygmy, or "mold man," is humanoid in shape (though only three feet tall) and somewhat intelligent. CJ Miozzi included the vegepygmy on The Escapist's list of "The Dumbest Dungeons & Dragons Monsters Ever (And How To Use Them)".
Verme			
Vilstrak			
Vulchling			
Vulture		Giant and Ordinary	
Weasel			
Webbird			
Wemic			
Willow, black			
Wolf-in-sheep's-clothing			
Wolfwere			
Worm		tenebrous worm and the tunnel worm	
Xag-ya and xeg-yi	The Lost Caverns of Tsojcanth (1982), Planescape Monstrous Compendium Appendix III (1998), third edition Manual of the Planes (2001)		
Xaren			
Yeth hound			
Yochlol (handmaiden of Lolth)			
Yuan-ti			A species of "cult-like snake people" and among "D&D's most popular and iconic monsters". The original yuan-ti castes were the abominations, the halfbreeds, and the purebloods, which first appeared in the module Dwellers of the Forbidden City (1981), In the adventure, the characters are hired to find an object taken to a lost oriental-style city, which has been taken over by a cult of snake-worshipers, the yuan-ti, and their servants, the mongrelmen and tasloi. The types have been summarized by A.V. Club as "a human-eating snake, or human-snake hybrid eater of humans and snakes, or other human-snake hybrids." Snakes and snake-worship used in fiction have been criticized as characteristic of Orientalism. The publication history, digital and print, of yuan-ti falls into this pattern as they serve as uncomplicated antagonists in "exotic" settings. Graeme Barber, a game designer noted for his critique of racism in Dungeons & Dragons, used yuan-ti in his contribution to the book Candlekeep Mysteries. Controversy arose after Wizards of the Coast, according to Barber, altered his depiction of yuan-ti. Summarizing his critique of the simplistic portrayal, Barber wrote, "Yuan-ti are evil because evil." Keith Ammann, in his 2019 book The Monsters Know What They're Doing, commented of the yuan-ti purebloods that "Yuan-ti have had hundreds of generations to live and adapt on their own, so they'll have the same self-preservation instinct as any evolved species." TheGamer.com in April 2021 listed the yuan-ti pureblood as #2 on their list of "10 Most Underrated Races That Are Better Than You Think". CBR.com listed the yuan-ti pure blood as #5 on their list of "Top 10 Playable Species In D&D".
Zombie, juju			
Zombie, monster			
Zorbo			
Zygom			

== Other sources ==
This section lists fictional creatures for AD&D 1st edition from various sources not explicitly dedicated to presenting monsters.

=== TSR 2021 – Dragonlance Adventures (1987) ===
The campaign setting hard-cover book Dragonlance Adventures contains a monster section called Creatures of Krynn.

ISBN 0-88038-452-2

Creature	Other Appearances	Variants	Description
Draconians		Auraks, Baaz, Bozaks, Kapaks and Sivaks	A "dragon-like humanoid species", born from embryos of good dragons corrupted by evil magic, are "cast as beings of pure horror", and "abominations"; "added to further support the world's foundational themes."
Dreamshadows			
Dreamwraiths			
Fetch			
Ice Bears			
Bloodsea Minotaurs			
Shadowpeople			
Spectral Minions			"nasties" also appearing the Advanced Dungeons & Dragons: Heroes of the Lance computer game.
Thanoi (Walrus Men)			
Krynn Dragons			Powerful and intelligent winged reptiles with magical abilities and breath weapon.
-- The Evil Dragons		Black, Blue, Green, Red and White Dragons	
-- Black Dragons	Dungeons & Dragons set (1974), D&D Basic Set (1977, 1981, 1983), Monster Manual (1977), D&D Companion Rules (1984), Dungeons & Dragons Rules Cyclopedia (1991), Monstrous Manual (1993), Monster Manual (2000), Monster Manual v.3.5 (2003), D&D Miniatures: Dragoneye set #44 (2004), D&D Icons: Gargantuan Black Dragon (2006), D&D Miniatures: Unhallowed set #55 (2007)		Chaotic evil dragons that spit acid
-- Blue Dragons	Dungeons & Dragons set (1974), Monster Manual (1977), D&D Basic Set (1981, 1983), D&D Companion Rules (1984), Dungeons & Dragons Rules Cyclopedia (1991), Monstrous Manual (1993), Monster Manual (2000), Monster Manual v.3.5 (2003), D&D Miniatures: Deathknell set #38 (2005), D&D Icons: Gargantuan Blue Dragon (2007)		Lawful evil dragons that discharge a bolt of lightning
-- Green Dragons	Dungeons & Dragons set (1974), Monster Manual (1977), D&D Basic Set (1981, 1983), D&D Companion Rules (1984), Dungeons & Dragons Rules Cyclopedia (1991), Monstrous Manual (1993), Monster Manual (2000), Monster Manual v.3.5 (2003). D&D Miniatures: War of the Dragon Queen set #38 (2005)		Lawful evil dragons that breathe a cloud of poisonous chlorine gas
-- Red Dragons	Dungeons & Dragons set (1974), D&D Basic Set (1977, 1981, 1983), Monster Manual (1977), D&D Companion Rules (1984), Dragon #134 "The Ecology of the Red Dragon" (1988), Dungeons & Dragons Rules Cyclopedia (1991), Monstrous Manual (1993), Monster Manual (2000), Monster Manual v.3.5 (2003), D&D Miniatures: Dragoneye set #55 (2004), D&D Miniatures: Giants of Legend set #71 (2004), D&D Icons: Colossal Red Dragon (2006)		Chaotic evil dragons that breathe a cone of fire
-- White Dragons	Dungeons & Dragons set (1974), D&D Basic Set (1977, 1981, 1983), Monster Manual (1977), D&D Companion Rules (1984), Dungeons & Dragons Rules Cyclopedia (1991), Monstrous Manual (1993), Monster Manual (2000), Monster Manual v.3.5 (2003), D&D Miniatures: Night Below #58 (2007), D&D Icons: Legend of Drizzt Scenario Pack (2007) ("Icingdeath, Gargantuan White Dragon")		Chaotic evil dragons that breathe a cone of cold
-- The Good Dragons		Brass, Bronze, Copper, Gold and Silver Dragons	
-- Brass Dragons	Greyhawk set (1974), Monster Manual (1977), D&D Basic Set (1997), Monstrous Manual (1993), Monster Manual (2000), Monster Manual v.3.5 (2003), D&D Miniatures: Dragoneye set #14 (2004), D&D Miniatures: Unhallowed set #19 (2007)		Chaotic good dragons that can breathe a cone of sleep gas or a billowing cloud of fear-causing gas
-- Bronze Dragons	Greyhawk set (1974), Monster Manual (1977), Monstrous Manual (1993), Monster Manual (2000), Monster Manual v.3.5 (2003), D&D Miniatures: War Drums set #7 (2006)		Lawful good dragons that breathe a bolt of lightning or a repulsion gas cloud
-- Copper Dragons	Greyhawk set (1974), Monster Manual (1977), Monstrous Manual (1993), Monster Manual (2000), Monster Manual v.3.5 (2003), D&D Miniatures: Angelfire set #21 (2005), D&D Miniatures: Desert of Desolation #23 (2007)		Chaotic good dragons that breathe a discharge of acid or a cloud of gas that slows creatures
-- Gold Dragons	Dungeons & Dragons set (1974), Monster Manual (1977), D&D Basic Set (1981, 1983), D&D Companion Rules (1984), Dungeons & Dragons Rules Cyclopedia (1991), Monstrous Manual (1993), Monster Manual (2000), Monster Manual v.3.5 (2003), D&D Miniatures: Giants of Legend set #61 (2004), D&D Miniatures: Deathknell set #7 (2005)		Lawful good dragons that breathe fire or chlorine gas
-- Silver Dragons	Greyhawk set (1974), Monster Manual (1977), Monstrous Manual (1993), Monster Manual (2000), Monster Manual v.3.5 (2003), D&D Miniatures: Archfiends set #5 (2004)		Lawful good dragons that breathe a cone of frost or a cloud of paralyzing gas

=== TSR 2023 – Greyhawk Adventures (1988) ===
The campaign setting hard-cover book Greyhawk Adventures contains a section called Monsters of Greyhawk.

ISBN 0-88038-649-5

Creature	Other Appearances	Variants	Description
Beastman			
Cactus, Vampire			
Camprat			
Changecat			
Crystalmist			
Dragon, Greyhawk			
Grung			"selfish, simple-minded frog people" based on poisonous frogs
Ingundi			
Nimbus			
Sprite, Sea			
"Swordwraith" (Stark Mounds Undead Spirit)			
Wolf, Mist			
Zombie, Sea ("Drowned Ones")			

=== Dragon magazine ===
The Dragon introduced many new monsters to the Advanced Dungeons & Dragons game.

Creature	Other Appearances	Variants	Description
Tibbit ("cat-were")	Dragon Compendium, Vol. 1		A race of shapeshifters, who can change from cats to human beings; small, with pointed ears in human form, and as perfectly normal looking cats in cat form. Appears in Dragon 135, The Dragon's Bestiary, by Scott Bennie

== See also ==
- Monsters in Dungeons & Dragons
- List of Dungeons & Dragons monsters (1974–76)
- List of Dungeons & Dragons monsters (1977–99)
- List of Dungeons & Dragons 2nd edition monsters
- List of Dungeons & Dragons 3rd edition monsters
- List of Dungeons & Dragons 4th edition monsters
