= List of Dungeons & Dragons monsters (1974–76) =

This is the list of Dungeons & Dragons monsters from products published in 1974–1976, an important element of that role-playing game. This list only includes content from the original 1974 Dungeons & Dragons boxed set, the Greyhawk supplement (1974), the Blackmoor supplement (1975), and Eldritch Wizardry (1976), and does not include any licensed or unlicensed third-party products such as video games or unlicensed Dungeons & Dragons manuals.

== TSR 2002 – Dungeons & Dragons Box Set (1974) ==
The 1974 Dungeons & Dragons boxed set by Gary Gygax and Dave Arneson contained three booklets, including a list of monsters in the booklet "Monsters & Treasure". This booklet contained an index on pages 3–4 featuring statistics about how many creatures of each type of creature appeared per encounter, armor class, how many inches the creature could move on its turn, hit dice, % in lair, and treasure. Pages 5–20 followed with descriptions of each of the monsters, typically consisting of one or more paragraphs. Most of the monsters on this book did not feature an illustration. Also featured are descriptions of humans (bandits, brigands, berserkers, dervishes, nomads, buccaneers, cavemen, and mermen), horses, insects, and other small and large animals.

Creature	Other Appearances	Versions Included	Description	Image
Basilisks	Original: Eldritch Wizardry; Basic 1977: Basic Set; Basic 1981: Expert Set; Basic 1983: Companion Set; Basic 1991: Rules Cyclopedia; 1st Edition: Monster Manual, Dragon #81; 2nd Edition: Monstrous Compendium Volume Two, Monstrous Manual; 3rd Edition: Monster Manual; 3.5 Edition: Monster Manual; 4th Edition: Monster Manual	Basilisk	Has the power of turning to stone by touch and glance. Based on the creature from medieval bestiaries. In the original Monster Manual it is described as a reptilian monster whose gaze can turn creatures to stone. AD&D's basilisk was also adapted into the Magic: The Gathering trading card game, with a depiction taken from the Monster Manual being used in a prototype version.	
Black Pudding	Basic 1977: Basic Set; Basic 1981: Expert Set; Basic 1983: Expert Set; Basic 1991: Rules Cyclopedia; 1st Edition: Monster Manual; 2nd Edition: Monstrous Compendium Volume One, Monstrous Manual, Dragon #219; 3rd Edition: Monster Manual; 3.5 Edition: Monster Manual	Black pudding	Black (or Gray) puddings dissolve wood, and corrode metal. "D&D's large variety of monstrous oozes and slimes took their original inspiration from Irvin S. Yeathworth Jr's The Blob" movie.	
Centaurs	Basic 1981: Expert Set; Basic 1983: Expert Set; Basic 1991: Rules Cyclopedia; 1st Edition: Monster Manual; 2nd Edition: Monstrous Compendium Volume One, Monstrous Manual, The Complete Book of Humanoids, Player's Option: Skills & Powers; 3rd Edition: Monster Manual; 3.5 Edition: Monster Manual	Centaur	Can attack twice, once as a man and once as a horse. Based on the creature from Greek mythology.	
Chimera	Basic 1977: Basic Set; Basic 1981: Expert Set; Basic 1983: Expert Set, Companion Set; Basic 1991: Rules Cyclopedia; 1st Edition: Monster Manual, Dragon #94; 2nd Edition: Monstrous Compendium Volume One, Monstrous Manual; 3rd Edition: Monster Manual; 3.5 Edition: Monster Manual; 4th Edition: Monster Manual	Chimera	Can gore with goat's head, tear with lion fangs, and dragon's head can bite or breathe fire. The chimera is based on the chimera of Greek mythology as found in the Iliad by Homer, "stronger than a centaur but weaker than a sphinx". Present in the game since the earliest edition.	
Cockatrices	Basic 1977: Basic Set; 1981: Expert Set; Basic 1983: Expert Set; Basic 1991: Rules Cyclopedia; 1st Edition: Monster Manual, Dragon #95; 2nd Edition: Monstrous Compendium Volume One, Monstrous Manual; 3rd Edition: Monster Manual; 3.5 Edition: Monster Manual	Cockatrice	A less powerful but more mobile basilisk, turns opponents to stone by touch. Based on the creature from medieval bestiaries.	
Djinn	Basic 1977: Basic Set; 1981: Expert Set; Basic 1983: Expert Set, Companion Set; Basic 1991: Rules Cyclopedia; 1st Edition: Monster Manual; 2nd Edition: Monstrous Compendium Volume One, Monstrous Manual; 3rd Edition: Monster Manual; 3.5 Edition: Monster Manual	Djinn	Aerial creatures with magical powers	
Dragons	Basic 1977: Basic Set; Basic 1981: Basic Set; Basic 1983: Basic Set, Companion Set; Basic 1991: Rules Cyclopedia; 1st Edition: Monster Manual; 2nd Edition: Monstrous Compendium Volume One, Monstrous Manual, Draconomicon; 3rd Edition: Monster Manual; 3.5 Edition: Monster Manual, Draconomicon; 4th Edition: Monster Manual, Draconomicon: Chromatic Dragons	White dragon, black dragon, green dragon, blue dragon, red dragon, golden dragon	Powerful and intelligent, usually winged reptiles with magical abilities and breath weapon. The different subraces, distinguished by their colouring, vary in power. The dragon has been referred to as the "iconic creature for D&D adventurers to conquer".	
Dryads	Basic 1981: Expert Set; Basic 1983: Expert Set; Basic 1991: Rules Cyclopedia; 1st Edition: Monster Manual, Dragon #87; 2nd Edition: Monstrous Compendium Volume Two, Monstrous Manual; 3rd Edition: Monster Manual; 3.5 Edition: Monster Manual; 4th Edition: Monster Manual	Dryad	Beautiful tree sprites, each a part of their own respective tree. Based on the dryad from classical sources.	
Dwarves	Basic 1977: Basic Set; Basic 1981: Basic Set; Basic 1983: Basic Set; Basic 1991: Rules Cyclopedia; 1st Edition: Monster Manual, Player's Handbook; 2nd Edition: Player's Handbook, Monstrous Compendium Volume Two, The Complete Book of Dwarves, Monstrous Manual; 3rd Edition: Player's Handbook, Monster Manual; 3.5 Edition: Player's Handbook, Monster Manual, Races of Stone; 4th Edition: Player's Handbook, Monster Manual	Dwarf	Described in the "Chainmail" set; clumsy monsters like ogres and giants have a hard time hitting them. Based on Tolkien's version of the dwarf. Often depicted as "short, stout, and fond of ale", "bearded masters of metalworking" and "predisposed towards a "good" moral alignment", "tend to embody an extreme vision of masculinity".	
Efreeti			Similar to djinn, but creatures of fire that tend to be Chaotic. A depiction of an "evil [...] efreet" already appeared in the original Dungeons & Dragons (1974) edition, another "enormous, devilish red" one was the main feature of the cover of the 1st edition Dungeon Master's Guide. Within the game's cosmology they were based on the Plane of Fire, centered around the "fabled City of Brass".	
Elves	Basic 1977: Basic Set; Basic 1981: Basic Set; Basic 1983: Basic Set; Basic 1991: Rules Cyclopedia; 1st Edition: Monster Manual, Player's Handbook; 2nd Edition: Player's Handbook, Monstrous Compendium Volume One, The Complete Book of Elves, Monstrous Manual; 3rd Edition: Player's Handbook, Monster Manual; 3.5 Edition: Player's Handbook, Monster Manual, Races of the Wild; 4th Edition: Player's Handbook, Monster Manual	Elf	Elves make their homes in woodlands and remote meadowlands. Based on Tolkien's version of the elf, "quick but fragile", with senses surpassing a human's, often depicted as "effeminate" and "predisposed towards a "good" moral alignment".	
Elementals			Four types described: Air, earth, fire, and water. Powerful creatures in the game; a characteristic of the air elemental is the ability of rapid movement.	
Gargoyles	Basic 1977: Basic Set; Basic 1981: Basic Set; Basic 1983: Basic Set; Basic 1991: Rules Cyclopedia; 1st Edition: Monster Manual; 2nd Edition: Monstrous Compendium Volume Two, Monstrous Manual; 3rd Edition: Monster Manual; 3.5 Edition: Monster Manual; 4th Edition: Monster Manual	Gargoyle	Reptilian bipedal beast, Chaotic in alignment. AD&D's gargoyle was adapted into the Magic: The Gathering trading card game, with a depiction taken from the Monster Manual being used in a prototype version.	
Ghoul	Basic 1977: Basic Set; Basic 1981: Basic Set; Basic 1983: Basic Set; Basic 1991: Rules Cyclopedia; 1st Edition: Monster Manual; 2nd Edition: Monstrous Compendium Volume One, Monstrous Manual, Dragon #252; 3rd Edition: Monster Manual, Savage Species; 3.5 Edition: Monster Manual, Libris Mortis: The Book of Undead; 4th Edition: Monster Manual	Ghoul	Paralyze anyone they touch. Undead with "terrible claws". AD&D's ghouls were also adapted into the Magic: The Gathering trading card game, with a depiction taken from the Monster Manual being used in a prototype version.	
Giants	Basic 1977: Basic Set; Basic 1981: Expert Set; Basic 1983: Expert Set; Basic 1991: Rules Cyclopedia; 1st Edition: Monster Manual; 2nd Edition: Monstrous Compendium Volume One, Monstrous Manual, Giantcraft; 3rd Edition: Monster Manual, Savage Species; 3.5 Edition: Monster Manual; 4th Edition: Monster Manual	Hill giant, stone giant, frost giant, fire giant, cloud giant	Overlarge powerful humanoids with a self-involved social focus, usually presented as the "bad guys". Based on mythological figures and Tolkien, their stone-throwing ability indicates their creative roots in wargaming.	
Gnolls	Basic 1977: Basic Set; Basic 1981: Basic Set; Basic 1983: Basic Set, Gazetteer: The Orcs of Thar; Basic 1991: Rules Cyclopedia; 1st Edition: Monster Manual, Dragon #63; 2nd Edition: Monstrous Compendium Volume One, Monstrous Manual, The Complete Book of Humanoids, Player's Option: Skills & Powers; 3rd Edition: Monster Manual; 3.5 Edition: Monster Manual; 4th Edition: Monster Manual, Dragon #367	Gnoll	A cross between gnomes and trolls, otherwise similar to hobgoblins. Richard W. Forest assumed them to be inspired from but not resembling the gnoles conceived by Lord Dunsany, while Gary Gygax himself stated that although Dunsany's "gnole" is close", he came up with the name as "a cross between a gnome and a troll", and the description was his original creation. He wanted to create a humanoid opponent in the game to fit in between the hobgoblin and bugbear in power. Gnolls were considered one of the "five main "humanoid" races" in AD&D by Paul Karczag and Lawrence Schick.	
Gnomes			Slightly smaller than dwarves, with longer beards, inhabits hills and lowland burrows. Player character race "often stereotyped as buffoons, illusionists, mad inventors, and many characters play them as intentionally "wacky" or anachronistic"; often conforms to the trickster archetype. "predisposed towards a "good" moral alignment".	
Goblins			Small monsters first described in the original "Chainmail" set. Based primarily on the goblins portrayed in J.R.R. Tolkien's Middle-Earth. Considered one of the "five main "humanoid" races" in AD&D by Paul Karczag and Lawrence Schick. Presented as "evil" and "predisposed towards a society of brutal regimes where the strongest rule" in the game. Suitable opponent for characters of lowest level.	
Gorgons	Original: Eldritch Wizardry; Basic 1981: Expert Set; Basic 1983: Expert Set, Companion Set; Basic 1991: Rules Cyclopedia; 1st Edition: Monster Manual, Dragon #97; 2nd Edition: Monstrous Compendium Volume Two, Monstrous Manual; 3rd Edition: Monster Manual,; 3.5 Edition: Monster Manual; 4th Edition: Monster Manual	Gorgon	Bull-like monsters with a breath capable of turning creatures to stone. "iron plated bull", based on early modern bestiaries, with only the name being derived from the Classical counterpart.	Dnd Gorgon
Gray Ooze			Seeping horror that resembles wet stone and corrodes metal like a black pudding	
Green slime			Non-mobile hazard that turns flesh into more green slime	
Griffons	Basic 1977: Basic Set; Basic 1981: Expert Set; Basic 1983: Expert Set; Basic 1991: Rules Cyclopedia; 1st Edition: Monster Manual; 2nd Edition: Monstrous Compendium Volume Two, Dragon #161, Monstrous Manual; 3rd Edition: Monster Manual, Savage Species; 3.5 Edition: Monster Manual; 4th Edition: Monster Manual	Griffon	The most prized of steeds, fond of horse flesh. Originally based on the creature from Persian mythology.	
Hippogriffs	Basic 1977: Basic Set; Basic 1981: Expert Set; Basic 1983: Expert Set; Basic 1991: Rules Cyclopedia; 1st Edition: Monster Manual; 2nd Edition: Monstrous Compendium Volume Two, Monstrous Manual; 3rd Edition: Monster Manual; 3.5 Edition: Monster Manual; 4th Edition: Monster Manual	Hippogriff	Fierce fighters that attack with both hooves and sharp beaks. Originally based on the creature from Persian mythology the adapted hippogriff "was among the earliest fantasy beasts introduced into the Dungeons & Dragons universe": An artistic representation drawing inspiration from real eagles and horses was used for the cover of the third booklet of the original Dungeons & Dragons (1974) edition and became one of "the game's earlies ambassadors" through use of that cover in advertisements. Gary Gygax used a story in which he received a letter asking how many eggs a Hippogriff could lay as an example of the encyclopedic knowledge which fans expected him to have over every detail of gameplay.	
Hobgoblins	Basic 1977: Basic Set; Basic 1981: Basic Set; Basic 1983: Basic Set, Gazetteer: The Orcs of Thar; Basic 1991: Rules Cyclopedia; 1st Edition: Monster Manual, Dragon #63; 2nd Edition: Monstrous Compendium Volume One, Monstrous Manual, The Complete Book of Humanoids, Player's Option: Skills & Powers; 3rd Edition: Monster Manual, Races of Faerûn; 3.5 Edition: Monster Manual, Dragon #309, Monster Manual V; 4th Edition: Monster Manual	Hobgoblin	Large and fearless goblins. Muscular humanoids somewhat taller than humans with reddish skin and canine teeth. Mordenkainen Presents: Monsters of the Multiverse gave them a new background as a species originating in and expelled from the Feywild, while also presenting hobgoblins societies with different characteristics on different worlds, but all centered around forming close-knit groups.	
Hydras	Basic 1977: Basic Set; Basic 1981: Expert Set; Basic 1983: Expert Set; Basic 1991: Rules Cyclopedia; 1st Edition: Monster Manual; 2nd Edition: Monstrous Compendium Volume One, Monstrous Manual; 3rd Edition: Monster Manual, Dragon #272; 3.5 Edition: Monster Manual; 4th Edition: Monster Manual	Hydra	Large dinosaurs with multiple heads. Based on the creature from classical sources, with Heracles' famed method of slaying it adapted into a vulnerability against fire, but not with the less well-known poisonous bite, showing how the game mostly focusses on the well-known traits of mythological creatures. Present in the game since its inception. AD&D's hydra was also adapted into the Magic: The Gathering trading card game, with a depiction taken from the Monster Manual being used in a prototype version.	
Invisible Stalkers	Basic 1981: Expert Set; Basic 1983: Companion Set; Basic 1991: Rules Cyclopedia; 1st Edition: Monster Manual; 2nd Edition: Monstrous Compendium Volume One, Monstrous Manual; 3rd Edition: Monster Manual; 3.5 Edition: Monster Manual	Invisible stalker	Monsters created by spells, faultless trackers	
Kobolds	Original: Blackmoor; Basic 1977: Basic Set; Basic 1981: Basic Set; Basic 1983: Basic Set, Gazetteer: The Orcs of Thar; Basic 1991: Rules Cyclopedia; 1st Edition: Monster Manual, Dragon #63, Dragon #141; 2nd Edition: Monstrous Compendium Volume One, Monstrous Manual, The Complete Book of Humanoids, Player's Option: Skills & Powers; 3rd Edition: Monster Manual; 3.5 Edition: Monster Manual, Dragon #332, Races of the Dragon; 4th Edition: Monster Manual, Dragon #364	Kobold	Similar to goblins but weaker. "[S]hort subterranean lizard-men", considered one of the "five main "humanoid" races" in AD&D by Paul Karczag and Lawrence Schick, and ranked among the weakest monsters in the game by Scott Baird from Screen Rant.	
Lycanthropes		Werewolf, wereboar, weretiger, werebear	Afflicted shapechangers, whose condition could be transmitted like a disease. Depiction of the werewolf is related to those in 1930s and 1940s Hollywood movies like The Wolf Man. Ranked sixth among the ten best low-level monsters by the authors of Dungeons & Dragons For Dummies: "a classic monster", interesting due to shapechanging because "players can never be entirely sure whether that surly villager might indeed be the great black wolf who attacked their characters out in the forest." Screen Rant has described the operation of lycanthropy in the game as an aspect that "makes no sense" because it is often a positive development for a character. "It is possible for a character to be infected with lycanthropy in Dungeons & Dragons and it comes highly recommended, as the benefits outweigh the negatives". Present in the game since its inception, an image of a werewolf's face by Gygax' childhood friend Tom Keogh was "[a]lmost certainly the oldest piece of art" in the original D&D.	
Manticoras	Basic 1977: Basic Set; Basic 1981: Expert Set; Basic 1983: Expert Set; Basic 1991: Rules Cyclopedia; 1st Edition: Monster Manual; 2nd Edition: Monstrous Compendium Volume One, Dragon #153, Monstrous Manual; 3rd Edition: Monster Manual; 3.5 Edition: Monster Manual; 4th Edition: Monster Manual	Manticore	Based on its mythological counterpart, including the barbed tail, the manticore appeared in the game from its earliest edition. Huge, lion-bodied monstrosities with a tail full of spikes that can be fired	
Medusae	Original: Eldritch Wizardry; Basic 1977: Basic Set; Basic 1981: Basic Set; Basic 1983: Basic Set, Companion Set; Basic 1991: Rules Cyclopedia; 1st Edition: Monster Manual; 2nd Edition: Monstrous Compendium Volume One, Monstrous Manual; 3rd Edition: Monster Manual, Savage Species; 3.5 Edition: Monster Manual; Dragon #355 (May 2007); 4th Edition: Monster Manual; 5th Edition: Monster Manual (2014)	Medusa	Human-type monster with the lower body of a snake, turns those who look at it to stone. Based on the creature from classical sources but translated into species of monsters originated from "humans seeking eternal youth". Part of the game from its very beginning, a medusa was already depicted in the playtest material from 1973 for the original edition.	
Minotaurs	Basic 1977: Basic Set; Basic 1981: Basic Set; Basic 1983: Basic Set; Basic 1991: Rules Cyclopedia; 1st Edition: Monster Manual, Dragon #116, Dragon #141; 2nd Edition: Monstrous Compendium Volume One, Monstrous Manual, The Complete Book of Humanoids, Player's Option: Skills & Powers; 3rd Edition: Monster Manual, Savage Species; 3.5 Edition: Monster Manual; 4th Edition: Monster Manual, Dragon #369	Minotaur	Bull-headed men, who are man-eaters. Based on the creature from Greek mythology, but translated from a singular creature into a species. The minotaur was among the monsters featured as trading cards on the back of Amurol Products candy figure boxes. AD&D's minotaurs were also adapted into the Magic: The Gathering trading card game, with a depiction taken from the Monster Manual being used in a prototype version.	
Mummies	Basic 1977: Basic Set; Basic 1981: Expert Set; Basic 1983: Expert Set; Basic 1991: Rules Cyclopedia; 1st Edition: Monster Manual; 2nd Edition: Monstrous Compendium Volume One, Monstrous Manual; 3rd Edition: Monster Manual, Dragon #300, Savage Species; 3.5 Edition: Monster Manual, Libris Mortis: The Book of Undead; 4th Edition: Monster Manual	Mummy	Touch causes a rotting disease. Based on the creature from Gothic fiction and appearances in more contemporary entertainment.	
Nixies			Water sprites are Neutral in nature but will enslave humans for one year	
Ochre Jelly			Giant amoeba which can be killed by fire or cold, but divides when hit by weapons. Ian Livingstone considered the ochre jelly one of the game's more "exotic and strange creatures".	
Ogres	Basic 1977: Basic Set; Basic 1981: Basic Set; Basic 1983: Basic Set, Gazetteer: The Orcs of Thar; Basic 1991: Rules Cyclopedia; 1st Edition: Monster Manual; 2nd Edition: Monstrous Compendium Volume One, Monstrous Manual, The Complete Book of Humanoids, Player's Option: Skills & Powers; 3rd Edition: Monster Manual, Dragon #304, Savage Species; 3.5 Edition: Monster Manual, Monster Manual IV; 4th Edition: Monster Manual	Ogre	Large and fearsome monsters. Large, powerful humanoid creatures, with slightly below average intelligence. Typical bad guys in the game, who can be used to teach "players about fighting big, powerful, stupid monsters, which is an iconic D&D experience".	
Orcs	Basic 1977: Basic Set; Basic 1981: Basic Set; Basic 1983: Basic Set, Gazetteer: The Orcs of Thar; Basic 1991: Rules Cyclopedia; 1st Edition: Monster Manual, Dragon #62, Dragon #141; 2nd Edition: Monstrous Compendium Volume One, Monstrous Manual, The Complete Book of Humanoids, Player's Option: Skills & Powers; 3rd Edition: Monster Manual; 3.5 Edition: Monster Manual, Monster Manual IV; 4th Edition: Monster Manual	Orc	Tribal creatures that live in caves or villages. Directly adapted from the orc in J.R.R. Tolkien's works. Considered one of the "five main "humanoid" races" in AD&D by Paul Karczag and Lawrence Schick. Presented as "evil" and "savage raiders" in the game.	
Pegasi			Winged horses that will serve only Lawful characters. Taken from greek mythology, an example of the diverse cultures amalgamated into D&D.	
Pixies			Air sprites originally described in the "Chainmail" set, naturally invisible to human eyes	
Purple Worms	Basic 1977: Basic Set; Basic 1981: Expert Set; Basic 1983: Expert Set; Basic 1991: Rules Cyclopedia; 1st Edition: Monster Manual; 2nd Edition: Monstrous Compendium Volume Two, Monstrous Manual; 3rd Edition: Monster Manual, Dragon #282; 3.5 Edition: Monster Manual; 4th Edition: Monster Manual	Purple worm	Huge and hungry monsters lurk beneath the surface. The "dread purple worm" attacks with both ends, maw and stinger. This "iconic monster" and original creation of Dungeons & Dragons is present all editions of the game.	
Rocs	Basic 1981: Expert Set; Basic 1983: Expert Set; Basic 1991: Rules Cyclopedia; 1st Edition: Monster Manual; 2nd Edition: Monstrous Compendium Volume Two, Monstrous Manual; 3rd Edition: Monster Manual; 3.5 Edition: Monster Manual; 4th Edition: Monster Manual	Roc	Large and fierce birds that nest in mountains; hostile to creatures of Chaos and Neutrality. An enormous bird, based on a mythological creature probably of Persian origin, known from Sindbad the Sailor.	
Skeletons	Basic 1977: Basic Set; Basic 1981: Basic Set; Basic 1983: Basic Set; Basic 1991: Rules Cyclopedia; 1st Edition: Monster Manual; 2nd Edition: Monstrous Compendium Volume One, Monstrous Manual; 3rd Edition: Monster Manual; 3.5 Edition: Monster Manual, Libris Mortis: The Book of Undead; 4th Edition: Monster Manual	Skeleton	Acts under the instructions of their motivator, be it Magic-User or Cleric (Chaos). Skeleton of a deceased creature animated as an undead. The skeleton was ranked second among the ten best low-level monsters by the authors of Dungeons & Dragons For Dummies: "introduces players to the special advantages and weaknesses of undead monsters". They also thank Ray Harryhausen for people knowing what fighting skeletons ought to look like.	
Spectres	Basic 1977: Basic Set; Basic 1981: Expert Set; Basic 1983: Expert Set; Basic 1991: Rules Cyclopedia; 1st Edition: Monster Manual; 2nd Edition: Monstrous Compendium Volume One, Monstrous Manual; 3rd Edition: Monster Manual; 3.5 Edition: Monster Manual; 4th Edition: Monster Manual	Spectre	Have no corporeal body and drain life energy levels. Inspired by Gothic fiction.	
Treants			Tree-like creatures able to command trees, Lawful in nature. Based on the Ent by J. R. R. Tolkien, and renamed due to copyright reasons.	
Trolls	Basic 1977: Basic Set; Basic 1981: Expert Set; Basic 1983: Expert Set, Gazetteer: The Orcs of Thar; Basic 1991: Rules Cyclopedia; 1st Edition: Monster Manual; 2nd Edition: Monstrous Compendium Volume One, Monstrous Manual; 3rd Edition: Monster Manual, Dragon #301, Savage Species; 3.5 Edition: Monster Manual; 4th Edition: Monster Manual	Troll	Thin and rubbery, loathsome creatures able to regenerate. A characteristic denizen of AD&D worlds. Their appearance and powerful regenerative ability is taken from Three Hearts and Three Lions by Poul Anderson rather than from their mythological or Tolkienesque counterparts. Considered one of the "five main "humanoid" races" in AD&D by Paul Karczag and Lawrence Schick.	
Unicorns	Basic 1977: Basic Set; Basic 1981: Expert Set; Basic 1983: Expert Set; Basic 1991: Rules Cyclopedia, Thunder Rift; 1st Edition: Monster Manual, Dragon #77; 2nd Edition: Monstrous Compendium Volume One, Monstrous Manual, Dragon #190; 3rd Edition: Monster Manual; 3.5 Edition: Monster Manual; 4th Edition: Monster Manual	Unicorn	Can be ridden by maiden-warriors and will obey them. Based on the creature from medieval bestiaries. The Dungeons & Dragons animated series featured Uni the unicorn as a well-received "mascot" and "cute animal sidekick".	
Vampires	Original: Greyhawk; Basic 1977: Basic Set; Basic 1981: Expert Set; Basic 1983: Expert Set; Basic 1991: Rules Cyclopedia; 1st Edition: Monster Manual; 2nd Edition: Monstrous Compendium Volume One, Monstrous Manual; 3rd Edition: Monster Manual; 3.5 Edition: Monster Manual, Libris Mortis: The Book of Undead; 4th Edition: Monster Manual	Vampire	Powerful undead. Depiction is related to those in 1930s and 1940s Hollywood Dracula movies, as well as folklore and Gothic fiction, and "classic" monster of the game.	
Wights	Basic 1977: Basic Set; Basic 1981: Basic Set; Basic 1983: Basic Set; Basic 1991: Rules Cyclopedia; 1st Edition: Monster Manual; 2nd Edition: Monstrous Compendium Volume One, Monstrous Manual; 3rd Edition: Monster Manual; 3.5 Edition: Monster Manual, Libris Mortis: The Book of Undead, Dragon #348; 4th Edition: Monster Manual	Wight	Thin humanoid undead that drains away energy levels on a hit. Directly adapted from the barrow-wight in Tolkien's The Lord of the Rings, while the concept is inspired by Icelandic sagas. Rob Bricken of io9 identified the wight as one of "The 12 Most Obnoxious Dungeons & Dragons Monsters".	
Wraiths	Basic 1977: Basic Set; Basic 1981: Expert Set; Basic 1983: Expert Set; Basic 1991: Rules Cyclopedia; 1st Edition: Monster Manual; 2nd Edition: Monstrous Compendium Volume One, Monstrous Manual; 3rd Edition: Monster Manual; 3.5 Edition: Monster Manual; 4th Edition: Monster Manual	Wraith	High-class wights with more mobility. Inspired by and renamed from the Nazgul from J.R.R. Tolkien's legendarium, as well as by Gothic fiction.	
Wyverns	Basic 1981: Expert Set; Basic 1983: Expert Set; Basic 1991: Rules Cyclopedia; 1st Edition: Monster Manual; 2nd Edition: Monstrous Compendium Volume Two, Monstrous Manual, Dragon Annual #1; 3rd Edition: Monster Manual; 3.5 Edition: Monster Manual; 4th Edition: Monster Manual	Wyvern	Smaller relatives of dragons with poisonous sting in tail.	
Yellow Mold			Deadly underground fungus that attacks wood and flesh. In the artificial dungeon environment of the game, molds function as a "clean up crew".	
Zombies	Basic 1977: Basic Set; Basic 1981: Basic Set; Basic 1983: Basic Set; Basic 1991: Rules Cyclopedia; 1st Edition: Monster Manual; 2nd Edition: Monstrous Compendium Volume One, Monstrous Manual; 3rd Edition: Monster Manual; 3.5 Edition: Monster Manual, Libris Mortis: The Book of Undead; 4th Edition: Monster Manual	Zombie	Acts under the instructions of their motivator, be it Magic-User or Cleric (Chaos). Based on the zombie from folklore as well as more contemporary entertainment.	

== TSR 2003 – Dungeons & Dragons Supplement I: Greyhawk (1974) ==
This first supplement to the Gygax/Arneson boxed set is by Gary Gygax and Rob Kuntz and was printed in 1974. Information is presented in a similar manner as that in the boxed set booklet. Page 33 contains an index of the monsters presented in the book, and pages 34–40 contain descriptions of each monster. Additions and corrections to Vampires and Elementals from the boxed set are included in this book on page 34.

Creature	Other Appearances	Versions Included	Description
Beholders	Basic 1983: Companion Set; Basic 1991: Rules Cyclopedia; 1st Edition: Monster Manual, Dragon #76; 2nd Edition: Monstrous Compendium Volume One, Monstrous Manual; 3rd Edition: Monster Manual; 3.5 Edition: Monster Manual, Lords of Madness: The Book of Aberrations; 4th Edition: Monster Manual	Beholder	"Spheres of Many Eyes" or "Eye Tyrants", a levitating globe with ten magical eye stalks. A "creature that looks at you and is destroying you by the power of its magical eyes". A terrible beast, but depicted as "a cuddly rosy ball with too many eyes". Designed to counter magic-using characters while being a formidable opponent for a whole party due to its versatility. Considered one of "the game's signature monsters" by Philip J. Clements. A "classic", "iconic", as well as "one of the most feared and fearsome monsters of the game", present through all editions.
Blink Dogs			Resemble African wild dogs, with high intelligence and an ability of limited teleportation
Bugbears			Great hairy goblin-giants, for the most part presented as inherently evil before the 5th edition of the game,
Carrion Crawlers			Worm-shaped scavengers whose touch causes paralyzation
Displacer Beasts			Puma-like creature with six legs and two tentacles growing from its shoulders. A magical creature resembling a puma with a tentacle growing from each shoulder, it hates all forms of life, and always appears 3 feet from its actual position. Based on the alien Coeurl from the short story Black Destroyer by A. E. van Vogt. Rob Bricken from io9 named the displacer beast as the 2nd most memorable D&D monster.
Doppelgangers			Creatures with mutable form, able to shape themselves into doubles of any person they observe
Dragons		Brass, copper, bronze, and silver dragons, the Platinum Dragon (The King of Lawful (and Neutral) Dragons) and the Chromatic Dragon (The Queen of the Chaotic Dragons)	Powerful and intelligent winged reptiles with magical abilities and breath weapon.
Druids			Priests of a neutral-type religion
Gelatinous Cubes			Cubic creatures that sweep clean the floor and walls of dungeon passages. In the artificial dungeon environment of the game, they function as a "clean up crew". The gelatinous cube, "a living mound of gelatinous jelly", was considered especially suited for that role, as it fi exactly in the standard grid for tactical combat. Considered an "iconic monster".
Giants, Storm			Intelligent giants found only in out-of-the-way places
Giant Tick			Overgrown arachnids which live on the blood of other living things and carry disease
Giant Slugs			Giant beasts that spit a highly acid saliva with considerable accuracy at great distances
Golems			Flesh, stone, and iron golems are described. The flesh golem is related to Frankenstein's monster as Universal's 1931 film, seen in e.g. being empowered by electricity, and all golems are inspired by Gothic fiction more generally, and "classic" monster of the game. The influence of Dungeons & Dragons has led to the inclusion of golems in other tabletop role-playing as well as in video games.
Harpies			Have the lower bodies of eagles and the upper bodies of human females. Based on the creature from Greek mythology. Witwer et al. viewed its artistic rendering in 5th edition as "redesigned from prior editions to entice more Dungeon Master use."
Hell Hounds			Reddish-brown evil hounds that can breathe fire
Lammasu			Human-headed, winged lions which are very lawful and very magical. The lammasu was introduced to the game in its first supplement, Greyhawk (1975). They are also lawful, although they have little interest in the conflict between law and chaos. Their innate magical powers let them cast spells as a 7th-level cleric.
Liches			Skeletal monsters that were formerly Magic-Users or Magic-User/Clerics in life. Emaciated undead spellcaster, a "classic" monster of the game.
Lizard Men			Aquatic monsters with a rude intelligence, fond of human flesh. Reviewer Chris Gigoux described them by saying "Lizard Men aren't bad, [...] they're just a simple folks, struggling to survive." An image of a lizard man by Greg Bell functioned as the logo in the early phase of TSR Hobbies, while "the bloodied bodies of lizard men" overcome by a group of adventurers featured on the cover of the 1st edition Player's Handbook, considered "arguably the most iconic piece of art in all of RPGdom" by Reactor magazine commentator Saladin Ahmed.
Lycanthropes (Wererat or Rat Man)			Extremely intelligent lycanthropes that will capture humans and hold them for ransom
Ogre magi			Japanese Ogres, far more powerful than their Western cousins
Owl Bears			Horrid creatures which "hug" like a bear and deal damage with a beak. Newly created for the game early on inspired by a Hong Kong–made plastic toy, the owlbear was well-received as a useful and memorable monster.
Phase Spiders			Giant spiders that can shift out of phase with its surroundings. Arachnid as big as a medium-large dog that can shift between dimensions and bite with fangs of deadly poison.
Rust Monsters			Creatures are the bane of metal with a ferrous content, which they rust instantaneously. An original invention for the game and its artificial underground world, the appearance of the rust monster was inspired by a plastic toy from Hong Kong. It was ranked among the most memorable as well as obnoxious creatures in the game, terrifying to certain characters and their players not due to their ability to fight but to destroy their items. Chris Sims of the on-line magazine Comics Alliance referred to the rust monster as "the most feared D&D monster".
Salamanders			Free-willed, highly intelligent Fire Elementals
Shadows			Non-corporeal intelligent creatures that hunger after the life energy of living things. Rob Bricken of io9 identified the shadow as one of "The 12 Most Obnoxious Dungeons & Dragons Monsters".
Stirges			Large, bird-like monsters with long probuscuses which suck blood from living creatures. "[P]esky" because while small they are dangerous to characters as a swarm. Present in the game since its earliest edition.
Titans			Similar to giants, but far more handsome and intelligent, even more so than humans. Based on the powerful beings from Greek mythology. Ranked among the strongest creatures in the game by Scott Baird from Screen Rant, as they "stand above giants and possess even more power in terms of their physical and magical capabilities". Backstab reviewer Michaël Croitoriu thought them truly interesting for powergamers when made available as player characters.
Tritons			Similar to Mermen in appearance, and can use spells. An aquatic race based on the merman in Greek mythology.
Umber Hulks			Human-shaped creatures with gaping maws flanked by pairs of exceedingly sharp mandibles. Present in the game since the earliest edition.
Will O'Wisp			Highly clever creatures that lure foes to feed upon their life force

== TSR 2004 – Dungeons & Dragons Supplement II: Blackmoor (1975) ==
This second supplement to the original boxed set is by Dave Arneson and was printed in 1975. Information is presented in a similar manner as that in the boxed set booklet. Page 14 contains an index of the monsters presented in the book, and pages 15–24 contain descriptions of each monster.

Creature	Other Appearances	Versions Included	Description
Dolphins			
Aquatic Elves			Also called sea elves, they are akin to mermen as land elves are to humans
Elasmosaurus			
Fire Lizard			
Floating Eyes			Small fish with a huge central eye that can hypnotize a victim
Giant Beaver			
Giant Crabs			
Giant Crocodile			
Giant Eels			
Giant frog	Blackmoor (1975); Monster Manual (1977); Monstrous Compendium Volume Two (1989); Dungeon #82 (September 2000); Return to the Temple of Elemental Evil (2001)		Dark green, covered in warts and boils and a foul-smelling ooze; 3 feet long and 2 feet tall. Attack by whipping poison at their prey with their tongues.
Giant Leech			
Giant Octopi			
Giant Otter			
Giant Sea Spider			
Giant Shark			
Giant Squid			
Giant Toads			
Giant Wasps			
Giant Beetle			Five types are described: giant stag beetle, rhinoceros beetle, bombardier beetle, fire beetle, and boring beetle
Ixitxachitl			A race of Chaotic Clerical Philosophers that resemble manta rays. An "old personal favorite" of reviewer Mark Theurer.
Lamprey			
Locathah			Nomadic people that ride eels and roam the ocean depths
Manta Ray			
Masher			Coral eaters, similar to large Purple Worms
Merfolk			More intelligent than lizardmen, these aquatic creatures use weapons as humans do
Minotaur Lizard			
Morkoth or Morlock			This shrouded wraith of the deep makes its home in spiraling tunnels. Paste magazine reviewer Cameron Kunzelmann found the morkoth an inventive and "super weird" monster beyond the game's staples.
Mososaurus			
Plesiosaurus			
Portuguese Man-Of-War			
Pungi Ray			
Sahuagin			"Devil-Men of the Deep", these voracious creatures are a constant threat to humans
Sea Horse			
Strangle Weed			Looks like ordinary seaweed but crushes its victims like a tentacle (Note: stats are not given on page 14)
Weed Eels			
Whale			

== TSR 2005 – Dungeons & Dragons Supplement III: Eldritch Wizardry (1976) ==
This third supplement to the Gygax/Arneson boxed set is by Gary Gygax and Brian Blume and was printed in 1976. Information is presented in a similar manner as that in the boxed set booklet. Page 27 contains an index of the monsters presented in the book, and pages 27–40 contain descriptions of each monster. Additions and corrections to several monsters from previous books in the series are included in this book from pages 27–29.

Creature	Other Appearances	Versions Included	Description
Brain moles			Small rodent-like creatures that are attracted by psionic activity
Cerebral Parasites			Tiny creatures that attack psionically endowed creatures
Couatl			Winged, feathered serpents found in jungles, with exceptional intelligence and powers. Based on the creature from Mesoamerican religion.
Demons –			Demons are chaotic and evil. Many were based on figures from Christian demonology. Considered among the "standard repertoire of "Monsters"" by Fabian Perlini-Pfister.
-- Demogorgon			This gigantic reptilian demon prince is powerful, has body and legs of a giant lizard, twin snake-like necks and two heads which bear the visages of evil baboons. Inspired by its real-world mythological counterpart.
-- Orcus			Grossly fat demon lord with goat-like head and legs, holds the wand of death (Orcus' Wand). Inspired by its real-world mythological counterpart.
-- Type I			Among the weakest of their kind, they resemble a cross between human and vulture
-- Type II			Looks like a gross toad with human arms in place of forelegs
-- Type III			Has a ghastly appearance, broad and strong-looking, with a head like a goat-horned dog, pincers instead of hands, and human arms protruding from its chest
-- Type IV			Combines the worst features of ape and boar, with small wings for their ponderous bodies
-- Succubus			Appears like a tall and very beautiful human woman, and drains energy by a kiss. Typical example of a demon, belonging to the "standard repertoire of "Monsters"", and one of those contributing to the moral panic; also an instance of the sexist tropes the game draws on which presented female sexuality as inherently dangerous. Rob Bricken of io9 identified the succubus as one of "The 12 Most Obnoxious Dungeons & Dragons Monsters".
-- Type V			Female demon with a multiarmed torso atop the body of a great snake
-- Type VI			Featuring a highly-muscled man-like body and bat wings, they are highly intelligent demons with great magical power. Based on and renamed from the Balrog from J.R.R. Tolkien's legendarium, also called type VI demon due to copyright reasons.
Intellect Devourers			Chaotic and evil monsters, highly malign with regard to sentient life. SyFy Wire in 2018 called it one of "The 9 Scariest, Most Unforgettable Monsters From Dungeons & Dragons", saying that "The idea of having your brain consumed and just becoming an evil puppet is truly terrible."
Ki-rin			Aerial creatures that dwell amongst the clouds, of the highest intelligence and completely lawful (and good). Golden-scaled flying equine exemplar of good with one horn. Based on the kirin from Japanese mythology, an example of the diverse cultures amalgamated into D&D. Black Gate reviewer Howard Andrew Jones called them "old stalwarts" of the game.
Mind Flayers			Super-intelligent, man-shaped creatures of great (and lawful) evil, tentacles penetrate to the brain and draw it forth for food. "Squid-headed humanoids", considered one of "the game's signature monsters" by Philip J. Clements. Reviewer Julien Blondel described them as vile brain-eating creatures full of psionic energy. He found them delightful creatures for a sadistic Dungeon Master to use, and a useful bridge between classic game worlds and the planes, as illithids abound in both.
Shedu			Similar in appearance to lammasu, human-headed winged creatures with bull-like bodies. Based on a creature from Mesopotamian mythology.
Su-Monsters			Evil and chaotic beings resembling wasp-waisted, great chested hounds
Thought Eater			Unintelligent ether dwellers attracted by psionic-related energy use

== TSR 2006 – Dungeons & Dragons Supplement IV: Gods, Demi-Gods & Heroes (1976) ==
This fourth supplement to the Gygax/Arneson boxed set is written by Robert Kuntz and James Ward and was printed in 1976.

Creature	Other Appearances	Versions Included	Description
Sphinx	Monster Manual (1977), Dragon #81, Dungeons & Dragons Master Rules (1985), Dungeons & Dragons Rules Cyclopedia (1991), Monstrous Manual (1993), Monstrous Compendium Annual Volume Two (1995), Monstrous Compendium Spelljammer Appendix II (1991), Dragon #244 (February 1998), Monster Manual (2000), Monster Manual (2003), Sandstorm: Mastering the Perils of Fire and Sand (2005), Tome of Magic: Pact, Shadow, and Truename Magic (2006), Monster Manual (2008)	Androsphinx, Criosphinx, Gynosphinx, Hieracophinx	Magical beasts, that appear as lions with the heads of various other human and animal creatures. Based on Egyptian and Classical mythology, an example of the diverse cultures amalgamated into D&D.

== See also ==
- Monsters in Dungeons & Dragons
- List of Dungeons & Dragons monsters (1977–94)
- List of Advanced Dungeons & Dragons 2nd edition monsters
- List of Dungeons & Dragons 3rd edition monsters
- List of Dungeons & Dragons 4th edition monsters
- List of Dungeons & Dragons 5th edition monsters
