= Centaur (Dungeons & Dragons) =

Fictional monster from Dungeons & Dragons

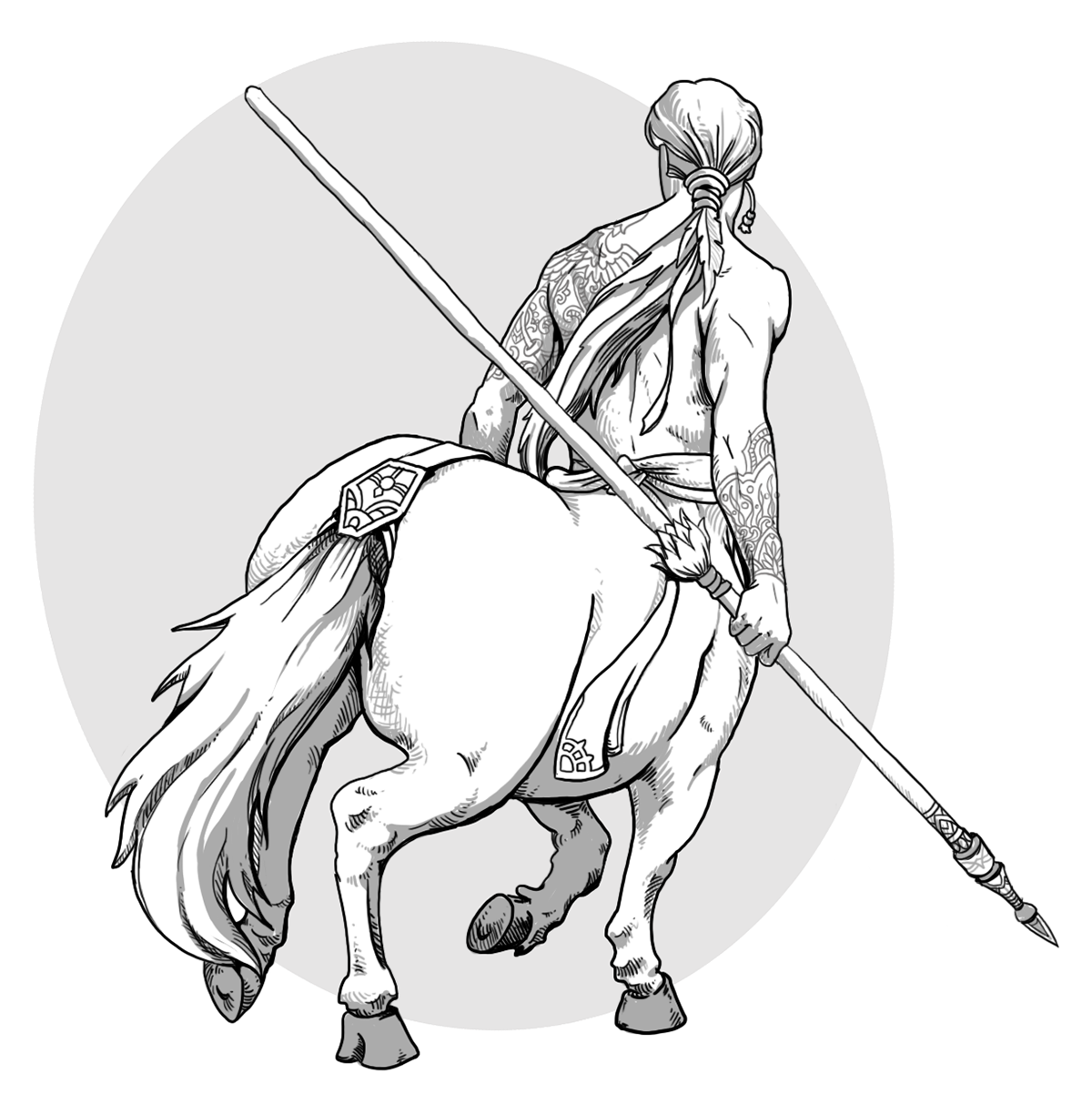
- Illustration of a centaur
- First appearance: Dungeons & Dragons (1974)
- Based on: Centaur

In-universe information
- Type: Monstrous humanoid
- Alignment: Neutral Good

In the Dungeons & Dragons fantasy role-playing game, the centaur is a large monstrous humanoid. Based upon the centaurs of Greek myth, a centaur in the game resembles a human with the lower body of a horse.

== Publication history ==
The centaurs of Dungeons & Dragons are based upon the centaurs of Greek mythology, including their proficiency in archery, though they are much more civilized.

=== Dungeons & Dragons (1974–1976) ===
The centaurs first appeared in the original Dungeons & Dragons set (1974).

=== Advanced Dungeons & Dragons (1977–1985) ===
The centaur appeared in the D&D Expert Set (1981, 1983) and the Dungeons & Dragons Rules Cyclopedia (1991). The centaur appeared as a character class in Tall Tales of the Wee Folk (1989).

The centaur appeared in first edition Advanced Dungeons & Dragons in the original Monster Manual (1977). The sea centaur appeared in Dragon #116 (December 1986).

=== Advanced Dungeons & Dragons 2nd edition (1989–1999) ===
The centaur appeared in second edition Advanced Dungeons & Dragons in Monstrous Compendium Volume One (1989) as the "sylvan centaur", reprinted in the Monstrous Manual (1993). The Abanasinian centaur, the Crystalmir centaur, the Endscape centaur, and the Wendle centaur appeared as the centaurs of Krynn for the Dragonlance setting in Monstrous Compendium Dragonlance Appendix (1990). The nomadic centaur and the learned ones of the Forgotten Realms setting appeared in The Horde Barbarian Campaign Setting (1990). The desert centaur of the Al-Qadim setting appeared in the Monstrous Compendium Al-Qadim Appendix (1992), and the desert centaur of the Greyhawk setting appeared in the adventure module Rary the Traitor (1992). The centaur is presented as a playable character race in The Complete Book of Humanoids (1993), which allows centaurs to be wizards, but not to advance beyond 12th level. The centaur is later presented as a playable character race again in Player's Option: Skills & Powers (1995).

=== Dungeons & Dragons 3.0 edition (2000–2002) and Dungeons & Dragons 3.5 edition (2003–2007) ===
The centaur appeared in the third edition Monster Manual (2000), and the version 3.5 Monster Manual (2003). The hueleneaer (desert centaur) appeared in Dungeon #103 (October 2003). The centaur appeared as a player character race in Savage Species (2003), the Forgotten Realms book Races of Faerûn (2003), and in Races of the Wild (2005).

=== Dungeons & Dragons 4th edition (2008–2014) ===
The centaur appeared in the fourth edition Monster Manual 2 (2009).

=== Dungeons & Dragons 5th edition (2014–) ===
The centaur appears in the fifth edition Monster Manual (2014). A playable centaur race was released alongside a playable minotaur for playtesting purposes in an Unearthed Arcana article released in May 2018 on the official Dungeons & Dragons website. An updated version of this race was officially released later that year in Guildmasters' Guide to Ravnica, a sourcebook focused on the plane of Ravnica from the universe of Magic: The Gathering, and again in 2020's Mythic Odysseys of Theros, another Magic: The Gathering tie-in supplement.

The playable centaur race was updated again and featured in Mordenkainen Presents: Monsters of the Multiverse (2022), this time presented from within the worlds of Dungeons & Dragons.

== Environment ==
Centaurs are typically found in temperate forests.

== Typical physical characteristics ==
A centaur has the upper body of a humanoid, and the lower body of a horse, leading to them being the heaviest player character race in the 5th edition of the game. They are usually unclothed, except for a quiver of arrows and, on rare occasions, light armor. Centaur warriors are usually equipped with composite longbows and longswords.

=== Racial traits ===
A combination of the traits of humans and horses, along with their affinity for wilderness survival, gives the centaur incredible strength, slightly less than twice the strength of an average human and the dexterity of an average elven archer. They are also known for their astounding ability to take much punishment, and for their wisdom. They are as fast on land as a horse (usually up to 2000 feet a minute when running), and like dwarves and orcs, they have darkvision. Their favored class is ranger. Unusually for player characters, centaurs in the 5th edition of the game are of the creature type fey rather than type humanoid, which "changes how they interact with many spells and effects".

== Society ==
Centaurs generally live in tribal hunter-gatherer societies. They have good relations with elves, as they are both creatures of the forest. Their relations with elves are mutual, mostly trading gold and treasure from the tribe's horde for items in large supply in elven communities (mostly alcohol). Elves are welcome in centaur territory, and typically share land. Centaurs generally despise humans and dwarves. Neutral, jovial creatures such as halflings and gnomes are tolerated in centaur territory when not causing damage.

=== Religion ===
Centaurs revere their sylvan god, Skerrit the Forester, the god of Nature and Community.

== Reception ==
Mythological creatures like the centaur were considered among the "standard repertoire of "Monsters"" of the game by Fabian Perlini-Pfister. Keith Ammann compared the adaption of the mythological creature in the Harry Potter series to the one in D&D: While the former were "standoffish, territorial, and even a bit malicious", the latter were presented as more friendly, with a good alignment, and therefore unlikely to use lethal force against player characters as long as they or their homeland were not attacked themselves.

Considering the 5th edition, centaurs have been suggested as especially suitable barbarian as well as ranger characters due to their high speed and ability to attack opponents with their hooves after a charge, as well as fighters as they also have a benefit in strength. A counter-balancing drawback is that "they are not well-suited to climbing".

Cody Prater from Screen Rant asserted that using "non-humanoid characters in Dungeons & Dragons give players the opportunity to remove themselves even further from the real world [and] can provide unique opportunities for roleplaying", exploring an unusual mindset. In the case of the centaur "trying to figure out how to maneuver a horse body everywhere can be an exciting and interesting thought process." He praised the interesting look of the species as well as their valuable in-game ability to carry much heavier loads than other characters, although in balance their size hampers any attempts at stealth. He summarized that "[c]entaurs provide the best of horse and man in one formidable package."

Screen Rant contributor Laura Gray positively remarked that the centaurs from the Mythic Odyssey of Theros setting are presented in two culturally and physically different variants, worked out in some detail; that they allow for "a well-rounded and powerful build that can do well in a range of different classes" with regard to game mechanics; and that with the characteristics of a "curious nature" and being "naturally inclined to embrace adventure" can be a fun player character choice from a role-playing point of view.

Also made available as player characters, where compared to human characters their "extra limbs [...] are to be envied".

== Other media ==
Centaurs appeared in the D&D Miniatures: Harbinger set #17 (2003), the Centaur Hero appeared in the Deathknell set (2005), and the Centaur War Hulk appeared in the Blood War set (2006).

== Other publishers ==
The centaur appeared in Paizo Publishing's book Pathfinder Roleplaying Game Bestiary (2009), on page 42.
