= Rust monster =

Fictional monster from Dungeons & Dragons

- First appearance: Dungeons and Dragons Supplement I: Greyhawk (1975)

In-universe information
- Type: Aberration (3rd edition) Monstrosity (5th edition)
- Alignment: Neutral

A rust monster is a fictional creature from the Dungeons & Dragons fantasy role-playing game that seeks out and consumes metal, often the armor and weaponry of players' characters. Originally inspired by a cheap plastic toy, the rust monster was one of the first monsters specifically created for D&D, and has been included in every edition of D&D, although various aspects of the creature have changed from edition to edition. In most editions, the rust monster has been a non-lethal creature with little or no way of physically harming player characters, however the rust monster's ability to destroy a character's cherished and expensive weapons and armor in mere seconds is what makes it a particularly fearsome opponent.

== Creation ==
In the early 1970s, Gary Gygax was playing Chainmail, a wargame that bore some precursors of Dungeons & Dragons. In order to give his players as many different challenges as possible, Gygax was always on the look-out for new monsters. Although he was able to draw on pulp fiction and sword and sorcery stories for many of them, he also looked through dime stores for figurines that could be used in battle. On one of those occasions, he came across a bag of small plastic toys euphemistically labeled "prehistoric animals". These were Hong Kong-made and the set included monsters from Japanese "Kaiju" films such as Ultraman and Godzilla franchise. Several of these were odd enough to catch his eye, and he used them to represent several new monsters, including the bulette and the owl bear. One of the figurines looked like an absurd lobster with a propeller at the end of its tail, and Gygax could think of no fearsome powers for such a monster. After some thought, he came up with the amusing idea that this non-lethal creature would not attack characters in order to eat them, but rather to eat their hard-earned possessions, especially those made of metal.

When I picked up a bag of plastic monsters made in Hong Kong at the local dime store to add to the sand table array ... there was the figurine that looked rather like a lobster with a propeller on its tail...nothing very fearsome came to mind... Then inspiration struck me. It was a "rust monster."

—Gary Gygax

== Publication history ==
=== Dungeons & Dragons ===
When Gygax co-developed the game of Dungeons & Dragons, the rust monster rapidly migrated to the new game system, and was described in the first supplement to the original rules, Dungeons and Dragons Supplement I: Greyhawk as "inoffensive" but "the bane of metal with ferrous content". The creature was attracted to the smell of iron-based metals, and any such object touched by the creature instantly turned to rust, which the rust monster would then consume. The rust monster could also use this power in its defense, since any metal weapon used against it would also turn to rust. Characters hoping to save their armor and weapons by avoiding it found they could not outrun it, since it moved about four times as fast as the average character.

=== Basic Set ===
The rust monster also appeared in the Dungeons & Dragons Basic Set (1977, 1981, 1983), as well as the Dungeons & Dragons Rules Cyclopedia (1991).

The rust monster was also featured in both the black box Dungeons & Dragons Game rule book (1991), and the Classic Dungeons & Dragons Game Rules and Adventure Book (1994).

=== Advanced Dungeons & Dragons ===
In 1977, the rust monster was updated for the Advanced D&D game, and was pictured for the first time, in an illustration by Dave Sutherland that depicted a round tick-like creature — albeit 3 feet high and 5 feet long — with a bony shell of armor, four mammal-like legs, two long antennae and a scaly prehensile tail ending in what appears to be a propeller. In this edition, the rust monster consumed all metal, although it still preferred ferrous metals over copper, gold or platinum. It had no bite, tail or claw attack, but the rust monster could smell metal from 90 feet away, and with an increase to its already rapid speed — it now moved six times faster than the average character — it would rapidly close and attempt to touch its antennae to metal, thereby causing the object to instantly corrode. (Magical weapons had a small chance to escape this fate.) In order to escape, fleeing adventurers could discard unwanted pieces of metal in the hope that the pursuing rust monster would stop for a few seconds to devour them. David M. Ewalt, in his book Of Dice and Men, discussed several monsters appearing in the original Monster Manual, warning "woe unto the armor-wearing adventurer who encounters a rust monster deep in some dark subterranean passage".

A droll illustration in the Dungeon Masters Guide shows a fully armored fighter leaping into the arms of a wizard for safety as they are confronted by a playful-looking rust monster.

In the May 1978 issue of The Dragon, Michael McCrery wrote "Excerpt from Interview with a Rust Monster", purportedly a talk with an adventurer who had been magically transformed into a rust monster. However, rather than acting as an insight into rust monsters, this was an article about how to properly explore a D&D dungeon.

The rust monster appeared in set 4 of the Monster Cards series in 1982.

In the August 1984 issue of Dragon (Issue #88), the rust monster was described more fully in "The Ecology of the rust monster", supposedly by a sage. In this article, it is a strange bacteria living in the rust monster's stomach and blood stream that caused metal to rust. Rust monsters have poor sight, although their sense of smell for metal is extraordinary. Handheld spears are useless against its armor, although wooden clubs and crossbow bolts were effective. Rust monsters give birth to live young.

The rust rat variant appeared in the UK's Imagine magazine #22 (January 1985).

=== Advanced Dungeons & Dragons, 2nd edition ===
In 1989, when the rust monster appeared in the Monstrous Compendium, Volume Two, several small details were changed. Its appearance was now less playful: its carapace was now tight-fitting scales, the propeller on its tail changed to a weapon-like paddle. Its coloration was now described as a yellowish tan underneath and a reddish brown on top. It is said to smell like rusty metal.

In 1993, when the rust monster appeared in the Monstrous Manual, the text remained the same, but its appearance was altered significantly. It now had an insectoid appearance: its four legs were now jointed and barbed like a grasshopper's, its antennae were slightly feathery, and its body was shaped like a wingless mayfly, with a well-defined head, thorax and abdomen.

=== Dungeons & Dragons 3rd edition ===
For the third edition of D&D, the rust monster was given a makeover, both in style and substance. Its illustration showed a return to roughly the original tick-like shape and bony armor of the first edition of AD&D; however, the insectoid legs, feathery antennae and general appearance from second edition remained. The biggest change was its speed, which was reduced to that of an average adventurer. It was also given a bite attack, albeit a very weak one, in addition to its corrosion attack. In this edition, the rust monster always strikes at the largest piece of metal available before moving on to smaller items.

The third edition of D&D used a 1-inch grid system to quantify movement and size. The rust monster was a Medium-sized creature, taking up a 1-inch × 1-inch square (5 feet × 5 feet in game terms).

The third edition of D&D included the Challenge Rating, a game mechanic that attempted to quantify the combat skill of each creature versus an average party of four adventurers. The rust monster was given a Challenge Rating of 3, meaning it was an appropriate challenge for a party of four 3rd-level adventurers. (In comparison, a blink dog was rated a 2, and a troll was rated a 5.)

==== Dungeons & Dragons v3.5 ====
In the "upgrade" of the Monster Manual to version 3.5 of D&D, the rust monster was left unchanged.

The rust monster appeared on the Wizards of the Coast website, in the "Design & Development: Monster Makeover" column.

The rust monster was further detailed in Dragon #346 (August 2006) in the article "Ecology of the Rust Monster"; this article also featured the O-akasabi-same, an advanced rust monster. This information was also featured in the Paizo book Dragon: Monster Ecologies (2007).

=== 4th edition Dungeons & Dragons ===
In the 4th edition of D&D, the rust monster appeared in the Monster Manual 2. Its appearance remained largely the same as third edition's. However, its speed was doubled, making it twice as fast as the average character. In addition, its bite was given a significant upgrade; for the first time, the rust monster was a dangerous physical threat to characters. Rather than corroding metal with its antennae, the rust monster now corroded metal only with successful bite. In a new development, if a rust monster ate a magical weapon, the "residuum"—the substance that gave the magic weapon its powers—stayed in the rust monster's stomach; once the monster had been killed, the residuum could be recovered and reused to make a new weapon.

== Reception ==
The rust monster is considered to be terrifying to certain characters and their players not due to their ability to fight but to destroy their items.

Rob Bricken from io9 named the rust monster as the 4th most memorable D&D monster, as well as one of "The 12 Most Obnoxious Dungeons & Dragons Monsters".

Chris Sims of the on-line magazine Comics Alliance referred to the rust monster as "the most feared D&D monster".

Keith Ammann notes in The Monsters Know What They're Doing that: "Despite the absurdity of a creature nursing itself on a pre-oxidized, chemically stable substance, we have to look at this unaligned monstrosity as an evolved creature, because any other explanation of its existence is just too meta".

L. Juel Larsen and B. Kampmann Walther in their work Fear of Monsters state that "Another example of a scary monster is The Rust Monster from the Monster Manual. The Rust Monster hungers for precious metals and therefore threatens the characters’ equipment. Painstakingly collected game material such as weapons and armor hangs in the balance once the Rust Monster appears. This makes The Rust Monster a truly feared creature."

== D&D Miniatures ==
A painted plastic miniature of the rust monster appeared in D&D Miniatures: Dangerous Delves in 2009.

== In other media ==
- The rust monster was card #581 of 750 in the 1991 TSR trading cards factory set.
- In Paul Kidd's novel Descent into the Depths of the Earth, a rust monster is used by one of the main characters (Escalla) to convince a sentient sword to cooperate with her plans. Another main character (Justicar) loses his black sword to a rust monster, possibly the same one.

== Other appearances ==
- A rust monster appears as a pet in the Futurama episode "I Second That Emotion". Although it is not mentioned by name, the presence of rust on its robot owner's body indicates that it is based on the Dungeons & Dragons monster. This is confirmed in the audio commentary for that episode on the DVD release. They are also mentioned briefly in a later episode "The Bots and the Bees".
- In strip #415 of The Order of the Stick, Xykon's crystal ball shows a rust monster chasing a paladin.
- The rust monster appears in NetHack.
- RustMonster is the name of a nautical-themed band.
- A rust monster appears as the title character of "Rusty & Co.", a webcomic about a group of monsters who form their own adventuring party to escape the usual monster fate of getting slain by wandering heroes.

== Other publishers ==
The rust monster is fully detailed in Paizo Publishing's book Dungeon Denizens Revisited (2009), on pages 52–57.
