= Orc (Dungeons & Dragons) =

Fictional Dungeons & Dragons race

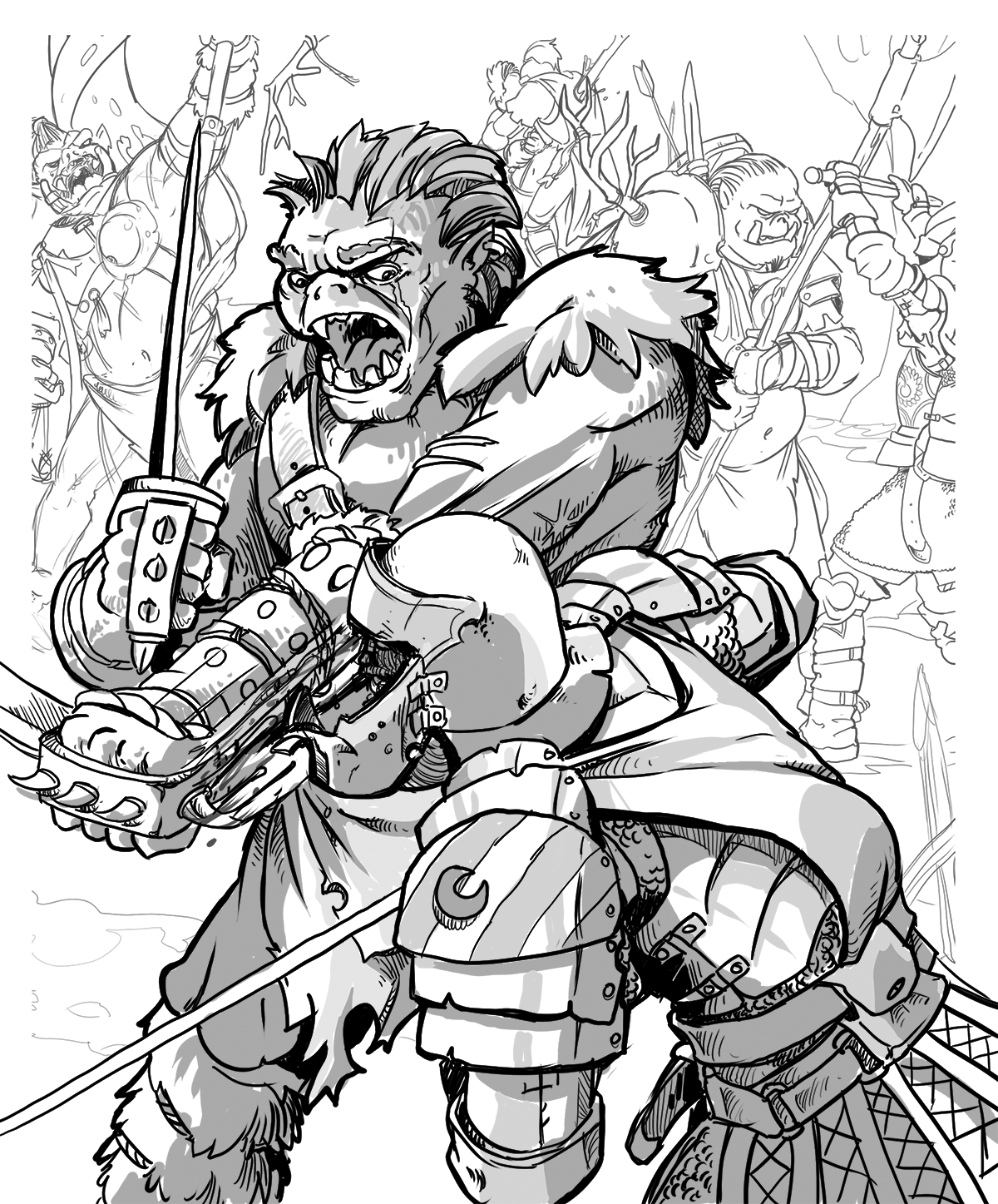
- First appearance: The Dungeons & Dragons "white box" set (1974)
- Based on: Orc

In-universe information
- Type: Humanoid
- Alignment: Usually Chaotic Evil

In the Dungeons & Dragons role-playing game, orcs are a primitive race of savage, bestial, barbaric humanoid.

== Publication history ==
The orc was one of the earliest creatures introduced in the D&D game. The D&D orc is largely based upon the orcs appearing in the works of J. R. R. Tolkien.

=== Dungeons & Dragons (1974–1976) ===
The orc was one of the first monsters introduced in the earliest edition of the game, in the Dungeons & Dragons "white box" set (1974), where they were described as tribal creatures that live in caves or villages.

=== Advanced Dungeons & Dragons 1st edition (1977–1988) ===
The orc appears in the first edition Monster Manual (1977), where it is described as a fiercely competitive bully, a tribal creature often living underground.

The mythology and attitudes of the orcs are described in detail in Dragon #62 (June 1982), in Roger E. Moore's article, "The Half-Orc Point of View".

In the article "Hey, Wanna Be a Kobold?" by Joseph Clay in Dragon #141 (January 1989), kobolds, xvarts, goblins, and orcs were presented as player character races along with two new character classes, the "Shaman" and the "Witch Doctor".

=== Dungeons & Dragons (1977–1999) ===
This edition of the D&D game included its own version of the orc, in the Dungeons & Dragons Basic Set (1977, 1981, 1983). The orc was featured as a player character race in The Orcs of Thar (1989). Orcs were also later featured in the Dungeons & Dragons Game set (1991), the Dungeons & Dragons Rules Cyclopedia (1991), the Classic Dungeons & Dragons Game set (1994), and the Dungeons & Dragons Adventure Game set (1999).

The Krugel orcs are presented as a player character race for the Hollow World campaign setting in the Hollow World Boxed Set, in the "Player's Guide" (1990).

=== Advanced Dungeons & Dragons 2nd edition (1989–1999) ===
The orc appears first in the Monstrous Compendium Volume One (1989), which also features the orog, a relative of the orc. The orc and orog are reprinted in the Monstrous Manual (1993).

The orc is first detailed as a playable character race in The Complete Book of Humanoids (1993). The orc is later presented as a playable character race again in Player's Option: Skills & Powers (1995).

The scro, a space-faring relative of the orc for the Spelljammer campaign setting first appears in Monstrous Compendium Spelljammer Appendix II (1991), and then in the modules Goblin's Return (1991) and Heart of the Enemy (1992). The scro is then presented as a player character race for the setting in The Complete Spacefarer's Handbook (1992) and is expanded on a few years later in the first Dragon Annual (1996) in the "Campaign Classics" feature.

The ondonti, a version of orcs bred by the goddess Eldath in the Forgotten Realms campaign setting, first appear in the Ruins of Zhentil Keep boxed set (in the Monstrous Compendium booklet) in 1995. The black and red neo-orog appear in the Realms' Spellbound boxed set (1995). These orc variants all then appear in the Monstrous Compendium Annual Volume Three (1996).

The Orog for the Birthright campaign setting appeared in the Birthright Campaign Setting set (1995).

=== Dungeons & Dragons 3.0 edition (2000–2002) ===
The orc appears in the Monster Manual for this edition (2000).

The gray orc is presented as a player character race for the Forgotten Realms setting in both Races of Faerûn (2003), and Unapproachable East (2003). The mountain orc and orog (deep orc) also presented as player character races in Races of Faerûn.

=== Dungeons & Dragons 3.5 edition (2003–2007) ===
The orc appears in the revised Monster Manual for this edition (2003).

The aquatic orc, the arctic orc, the desert orc, the jungle orc, the orc paragon, and the water orc were all introduced in Unearthed Arcana (2004). The orc snow shaman appeared in Frostburn: Mastering the Perils of Ice and Snow (2004). The orc battle priest, the orc berserker, and the war howler orc are introduced in the Monster Manual IV (2006). The frostblood orcs appear in Dragon Magic (2006).

The sharakim are a race of orcs that were transformed from humans, and appeared as a player character race in Races of Destiny (2004).

The scro of the Spelljammer setting return in Dragon #339 (January 2006).

=== Dungeons & Dragons 4th edition (2008–2014) ===
The orc appears in the Monster Manual for this edition (2008), and is also presented as an optional player character race.

=== Dungeons & Dragons 5th edition (2014–) ===
The orc appears in the Monster Manual for this edition (2014). Orcs are given further detail and are available as a Player Character race in the supplement Volo's Guide to Monsters.

==== 2024 revision ====
In the 2024 revision of the 5th edition rules, orcs are available in the Player's Handbook as a playable race, replacing the half-orc available in previous editions. This edition also replaces references to race with the word "species".

== Description ==
Orcs are carnivorous humanoids, standing approximately 5'11" to 6'2", weighing from 180 to 280 lbs. They are easily noticeable due to their green to gray skin, lupine ears, lower canines resembling boar tusks, and their muscular builds. Orcs stand in a bent over shape making them appear as ape-like humans.

Bestial and savage, orcs band together as trıbes, living on hunting and raiding. Believing that the only way to survive is by expanding their territories, they have developed enmities wıth many other races, although mainly elves and dwarves, as well as humans, gnomes, halflings, goblins, hobgoblins, and even other orc tribes. Even though they have good relationships with other evil humanoids in times of peace, their chaotic nature stops them from cooperating unless forced to do so by a powerful leader. Orcs live in a patriarchal society, taking pride on how many females and male children they have. Orcs like scars and take pride in exposing them, whether they are of a victory or loss. Their chief deity Gruumsh claims that the orc is the top of the food chain, and that all riches are the property of orcs stolen by others.

Aside from Gruumsh, the other orc deities include Bahgtru (deity of Strength and Combat), Ilneval (deity of Warfare and Leadership), Luthic (goddess of Fertility, Medicine, Females, and Servitude), Shargaas (deity of darkness, night, stealth, thieves, and the undead), and Yurtrus (deity of death and disease).

== Subtype ==
In earlier editions of Dungeons & Dragons, the orc was a subtype of goblinoid. In the third version, the orc was promoted to its own subtype.

=== In earlier editions ===
Orcs vary widely in appearance as a result of frequent crossbreeding with other species. In general, they resemble primitive humans with grey-green skin covered with coarse hair. Orcs have a slightly stooped posture, a low jutting forehead, and a snout instead of a nose. Orcs have well-developed canine teeth for eating meat and short pointed ears that resemble those of a wolf. Orcish snouts and ears have a slightly pink tinge. Their eyes are human, with a reddish tint that sometimes makes them appear to glow red when they reflect dim light sources in near darkness. This is actually part of their optical system, a pigment which gives them infravision. Male orcs are about 5½ to 6 feet tall. Females average 6 inches shorter than males. Orcs prefer to wear colors that most humans think unpleasant: blood red, rust red, mustard yellow, yellow green, moss green, greenish purple, and blackish brown. Their armor is unattractive besides—dirty and often a bit rusty. Orcs speak Orcish, a language derived from older human and elvish languages. There is no common standard of Orcish, so the language has many dialects which vary from tribe to tribe. Orcs have also learned to speak local common tongues, but are not comfortable with them. Some orcs have a limited vocabulary in goblin, hobgoblin, and ogre dialects.

Earlier versions of Dungeons & Dragons depicted orcs slightly differently. They were Lawful Evil and had fully porcine snouts. An illustration by David C. Sutherland III in the 1977 Monster Manual clearly showed them with pig-like faces, a depiction which persisted for several years. For example, illustrations accompanying the Dungeons & Dragons tournament adventure Round the Bend, published in issue #15 of Imagine magazine (June 1984), also portrayed them as pig-men.

An insightful passage from the Monstrous Manual reads, "Orcs have a reputation for cruelty that is deserved, but humans are just as capable of evil as orcs".

The half-orc in the original AD&D game was a standard player character race, typically assuming the assassin class. Half-orcs were removed in the second edition of the game but were revived, albeit altered, in one of the 1995 revision books—Player's Option: Skills & Powers—to the second edition rules. Half-orcs also appear as a core playable race in D&D 3rd edition.

== Orc crossbreeds ==
A fecund race, orcs often breed with other humanoid creatures. Known crossbreeds include:

- Half-orcs: These orc-human crossbreeds are most often born in as the unfortunate byproduct of raids in border areas between human and orc cultures. Despite rejection from both sides of their heritage, many half-orcs achieve renown.
- Losels: Losels are orc-baboon crossbreeds bred by Iuz and the Scarlet Brotherhood because they reproduce faster than common orcs.
- Ogrillions: These creatures are the brutish, armor-skinned offspring of a female orc and a male ogre.
- Orogs: An orog is the offspring of a male orc and a female ogre. Orogs usually live among orcs; they are stronger, more intelligent, and more disciplined than typical orcs.
- Tanarukka: Originally tiefling-orc crossbreeds born of the orcs of Hellgate Keep and the tanar'ri (demons) of that dungeon, they have bred true as a race over the centuries. A tanarukk resembles a typical orc but is shorter, stockier, and more stooped in its posture with a scale-like ridge on its low, sloped forehead. They are slightly more intelligent than their orc forebears, but still respect only strength and power.

== In various campaign settings ==
Orcs appear in nearly all published Dungeons & Dragons settings.

=== In Dragonlance ===
There is some controversy regarding orcs in the Dragonlance. The 1st edition AD&D Dragonlance Adventures hardbound rulebook states that orcs do not exist on Krynn, with ogres and minotaurs largely replacing their typical role. Second and 3rd edition Dragonlance supplements also remove orcs from the world of Krynn. The main confusion on the subject has occurred from a few Dragonlance novels and/or adventures in which the writer has accidentally included orcs. In particular, the novel Kendermore by Mary Kirchoff, where one of the main characters is a half-orc. This has occurred with other iconic races of Dungeons & Dragons, such as drow, that are not native to the Dragonlance setting. Some suggest that the presence of orcs in Dragonlance can be explained through planar or space travel as Krynn is connected to other Dungeons & Dragons worlds (where orcs exist) through the Planescape and Spelljammer settings.

=== In Eberron ===
In the Eberron campaign setting, orcs are portrayed in a more positive light. Given to spirituality and nature-worship, they established successful societies, learning druidic secrets from the black dragon Vvaraak while the goblinoid races built a mighty empire, some 16,000 years ago.

The orc societies took a massive blow during the daelkyr invasion 9,000 years ago, though it was the orcs now known as the Gatekeepers who were able to stop the invasion by sealing the daelkyr beneath Eberron and severing the link between Eberron and the daelkyr home plane of Xoriat. The Gatekeeper druidic sect remains a presence in Eberron, albeit one largely concerned with defending the world from outsiders, aberrations and other unnatural foes rather than politics.

=== In the Forgotten Realms ===
In the Forgotten Realms campaign setting, orcs are divided into the orcs of the north (Mountain Orcs) and the orcs of the east (Gray Orcs). The gray orcs came to Faerûn through a portal opened in Mulhorand by an Imaskari wizard. The orcs' invasion caused the Orcgate Wars in which the pious gray orcs called avatars of their deities down to help them, and the Mulhorandi and Untheric people did the same. Led by Re these pantheons and their soldiers eventually broke the gray orcs' armies.

In the north, orcs are known for overbreeding and then spilling out in hordes upon the nations thereabouts, including the Silver Marches, Icewind Dale and, in times past, the old elven empires around Cormanthyr. Foremost amongst the orcs of this area is the Many Arrows tribe headed by King Obould Many-Arrows, who is blessed by Gruumsh.

=== In Greyhawk ===
In the World of Greyhawk, orcs, called euroz in the Flan tongue, can be found in almost all locales of the Flanaess, but are most heavily concentrated in the Pomarj and the Empire of Iuz, the Bone March, and North Kingdom. There is also known to exist a great orcish city known as Garel Enkdal in the Griff Mountains. The orcs of the Baklunish nation of Zeif are very different from their brethren, having very nearly been assimilated into human society, though they are still regarded as lower-class.

=== In Mystara ===
Orcs are prevalent in both the Known World, the Savage Coast, and the Hollow World. They were featured in GAZ 10, The Orcs of Thar, which details their culture and more about the orc-dominated Broken Lands southeast of Glantri.

=== In Spelljammer ===
A variety of orc, called "scro" ("orcs" spelled backward), were featured in the Spelljammer setting. Unlike the typical orcs featured in Dungeons & Dragons, the scro were sophisticated and disciplined, with a strong, well-organized martial culture.

=== In d20 System settings ===
Following the precedents set in the earliest Dungeons & Dragons materials, many d20 System publishers have retained Orcs in their own works. While many of these publishers have examined orcs in greater depth than was the norm in earlier works, most of those have not reinvented this race as such, and it still tends to be identified with coarseness and brutality. Such products include Badaxe Games Heroes of High Favor: Half-Orcs and Skirmisher Publishing's Orcs of the Triple Death line of miniatures, as well as the Pathfinder role playing game by Paizo Publishing.

== Critical reception ==
The orc was ranked first among the ten best low-level monsters by the authors of Dungeons & Dragons For Dummies. They describe the orc as "The iconic man-beast savage... simply the classic adversary for a low-level hero." Reviewer Dan Wickline from Bleeding Cool considered them a classic of D&D and among "the more distinctive race options in the D&D multiverse".

The orc was directly adapted from the orc in J.R.R. Tolkien's works. The orc was considered one of the "five main "humanoid" races" in AD&D by Paul Karczag and Lawrence Schick, and among the "iconic D&D monsters" by the game's chroniclers Witwer et al.. The orc is presented as "evil" and "savage raiders" in the game.

A.V. Club reviewer Nick Wanserski praised the "thoughtful" look on orcs provided in Volo's Guide to Monsters: While "such staples as orcs, goblins, and kobolds [...] often get lumped together as a dull monolith", the many details here give "a lot of personality to an otherwise easily forgettable monster."

=== Controversy ===
Some writers have described the depiction of orcs in J.R.R. Tolkien's Lord of the Rings as "deranged and repulsive versions" of Mongol stereotypes and "inherently evil humanoid creatures". The depictions of orcs in Dungeons & Dragons (1974) and Advanced Dungeons & Dragons (1977) were the first major appearances of orcs outside Tolkien's work. Helen Young, an Australian academic, highlighted that the descriptions of orc bodies "resonate with anti-Black racist stereotypes" and a "comparison to animals, particularly pigs, is common in almost all editions of D&D up to the present. [...] That orc bodies are violent and belligerent is iterated and re-iterated with each issue of a new edition of D&D rules". Chris Sims, in the 4th Edition book Wizards Presents: Races and Classes (2007), wrote "where dwarves gather and build, orcs scavenge and destroy, and where dwarves are dutiful and industrious, orcs are treacherous and lazy".

Some view orcs as a representation of the Other, "a philosophical concept used to paint entire cultures as being somehow inferior or evil because they were different". Gabrielle Lissauer, in The Tropes of Fantasy Fiction, highlighted that the Eberron campaign setting subverts the classical racial presentation of orcs as savages. Instead, Lissauer wrote "these orcs are interested in peace and keeping the world safe. [...]. They just want to live in harmony with nature". Another critic views that any portrayal of a fictional race or a "group of intelligent people as inherently evil feeds into the notion of harmful stereotypes. [...] Additionally, deciding that orcs are inherently less intelligent than other races also touches upon harmful topics of eugenics and the belief that some people are less intelligent solely due to their genetics".

However, the notion of orcs as a racist trope is controversial. The Germanic studies scholar Sandra Ballif Straubhaar argues against the "recurring accusations" of racism in Tolkien's Middle-earth, stating that "a polycultured, polylingual world is absolutely central" to the Middle-earth setting of Lord of the Rings, and that readers and filmgoers will easily see that. In 2022, academic Christopher Ferguson reported that "only 10.2% found a depiction of orc monsters as inherently evil to be offensive" after he conducted a survey study of 308 adults (38.2% non-White, and 17% Dungeons and Dragons players).

In March 2020, Christian Hoffer, for ComicBook, highlighted that 5th Edition Explorer's Guide to Wildemount (2020) reuses the Orc race stats from Eberron: Rising From the Last War (2019) rather than the stats originally published in Volo's Guide to Monsters (2016). Some of the differences include not having an intelligence stat penalty and the "Menacing" trait. Hoffer wrote that the book "takes an important step in specifying that no race of intelligent creatures in [sic] inherently evil, nor are they inherently less smart than other races. While many still see the idea of 'race' in Dungeons & Dragons as problematic, Explorer's Guide to Wildemount at least removes one of the most problematic aspects of that part of D&D". In their official June 2020 statement, the D&D Team wrote: "throughout the 50-year history of D&D, some of the peoples in the game—orcs and drow being two of the prime examples—have been characterized as monstrous and evil, using descriptions that are painfully reminiscent of how real-world ethnic groups have been and continue to be denigrated. That's just not right, and it's not something we believe in. Despite our conscious efforts to the contrary, we have allowed some of those old descriptions to reappear in the game".

== Other publishers ==
The orc is fully detailed in Paizo Publishing's book Classic Monsters Revisited (2008), on pages 52–57.

== In popular culture ==
- The First Edition AD&D orc's porcine depiction in the Monstrous Manual has been expanded in various pop culture titles into a fully pig-like appearance, such as in:
  - the Endless Quest volume 11, Spell of the Winter Wizard, published by TSR (art by Jeffrey R. Busch)
  - the hentai OVA series JK to Orc Heidan
  - the manga Re:Monster
  - Monster Musume
  - the Lufia video game series
