= Displacer beast =

Fictional creature in Dungeons & Dragons

- First appearance: Supplement I - Greyhawk (1975)
- Based on: the Coeurl

In-universe information
- Type: Magical beast
- Alignment: Lawful Evil

A displacer beast is a fictional evil feline creature created for the Dungeons & Dragons role-playing game in 1975; it has subsequently been included in every edition of the game to the present day.

== Description ==
A displacer beast is a magical six-legged black panther-like feline with a pair of tentacles growing from its shoulders. The beast's name comes from its innate "displacement" ability whereby it magically bends light to create the illusion that it is a short distance away from its actual location. "These mighty predators are typically found in the Feywild", "an alternate plane of existence" home to D&D's version of fairies.

== Publication history ==
=== Dungeons & Dragons (1974–1976) ===
The displacer beast was created for Dungeons & Dragons, first introduced in the game's supplement, Greyhawk (1975), as "a puma-like creature with six legs and a pair of tentacles which grow from its shoulders." The concept of the creature was borrowed from A. E. van Vogt's 1939 science fiction story "Black Destroyer", which described a feline-like creature called a coeurl. Van Vogt later incorporated the coeurl into the novel The Voyage of the Space Beagle (1950).

=== Advanced Dungeons & Dragons 1st edition (1977–1988) ===
The displacer beast appears in the first edition Monster Manual (1977), where it is described as a vaguely puma-like beast that always appears to be three feet away from its actual position. David M. Ewalt, in his book Of Dice and Men, discussed several monsters appearing in the original Monster Manual, describing displacer beasts as looking like "pumas with thorn-covered tentacles growing out of their shoulders".

The displacer beast was detailed in Dragon #109 (May 1986), in the "Ecology of the Displacer Beast".

=== Dungeons & Dragons (1977–1999) ===
This edition of the D&D game included its own version of the displacer beast, in the Dungeons & Dragons Basic Set (1977), and Expert Set (1981 & 1983), and was also later featured in the Dungeons & Dragons Game set (1991), the Dungeons & Dragons Rules Cyclopedia (1991), the Classic Dungeons & Dragons Game set (1994), and the Dungeons & Dragons Adventure Game set (1999).

=== Advanced Dungeons & Dragons 2nd edition (1989–1999) ===
The displacer beast appears in the Monstrous Compendium Volume One (1989), and is reprinted in the Monstrous Manual (1993).

=== Dungeons & Dragons 3.0 & 3.5 editions (2000–2007) ===
The displacer beast appears in the 3rd edition Monster Manual (2000) and then in the 3.5 edition Monster Manual (2003). This edition also described the displacer beast pack lord. For this edition, Wizards of the Coast considered the displacer beast to be an original product of D&D and was therefore categorized as a "Product Identity"; as such it was not released under its Open Game License.

=== Dungeons & Dragons 4th edition (2008–2013) ===
The displacer beast appears in the 4th edition Monster Manual (2008), and again a description is included for the displacer beast pack lord.

=== Dungeons & Dragons 5th edition (2014) ===
The displacer beast appears in the 5th edition Monster Manual (2014). It is considered a copyrighted original creation for the Dungeons & Dragons game.

== Other media ==
A displacer beast appears in the film Dungeons & Dragons: Honor Among Thieves. A displacer beast kitten is a Magic: The Gathering card created as part of the Baldur's Gate crossover.

== Reception ==
Rob Bricken from io9 named the displacer beast as the 2nd most memorable D&D monster. Reviewers also counted it among the "most iconic" and "fan-favorite" monsters of the game. It was considered an "old-school" and "most enduring" monster, having been part of the game from its earliest stages. Author Ben Riggs remarked on the movie version of the displacer beast: "The design of the creature is just so fantastic. It's creepy. Even though it's a panther with a couple tentacles, at first you're creeped out". David M. Marshall remarked that the displacer beast is one of the elements "which disrupts the roughly period [medieval] atmosphere of the game".

== Other marketing: D&D Miniatures ==
- Harbinger set #41 (2003)
- War of the Dragon Queen set #29 (2006) (Displacer Beast Pack Lord)
- Unhallowed set #37 (2007) (Displacer Beast Manhunter)
