= Goblin (Dungeons & Dragons) =

Fictional monster from Dungeons & Dragons

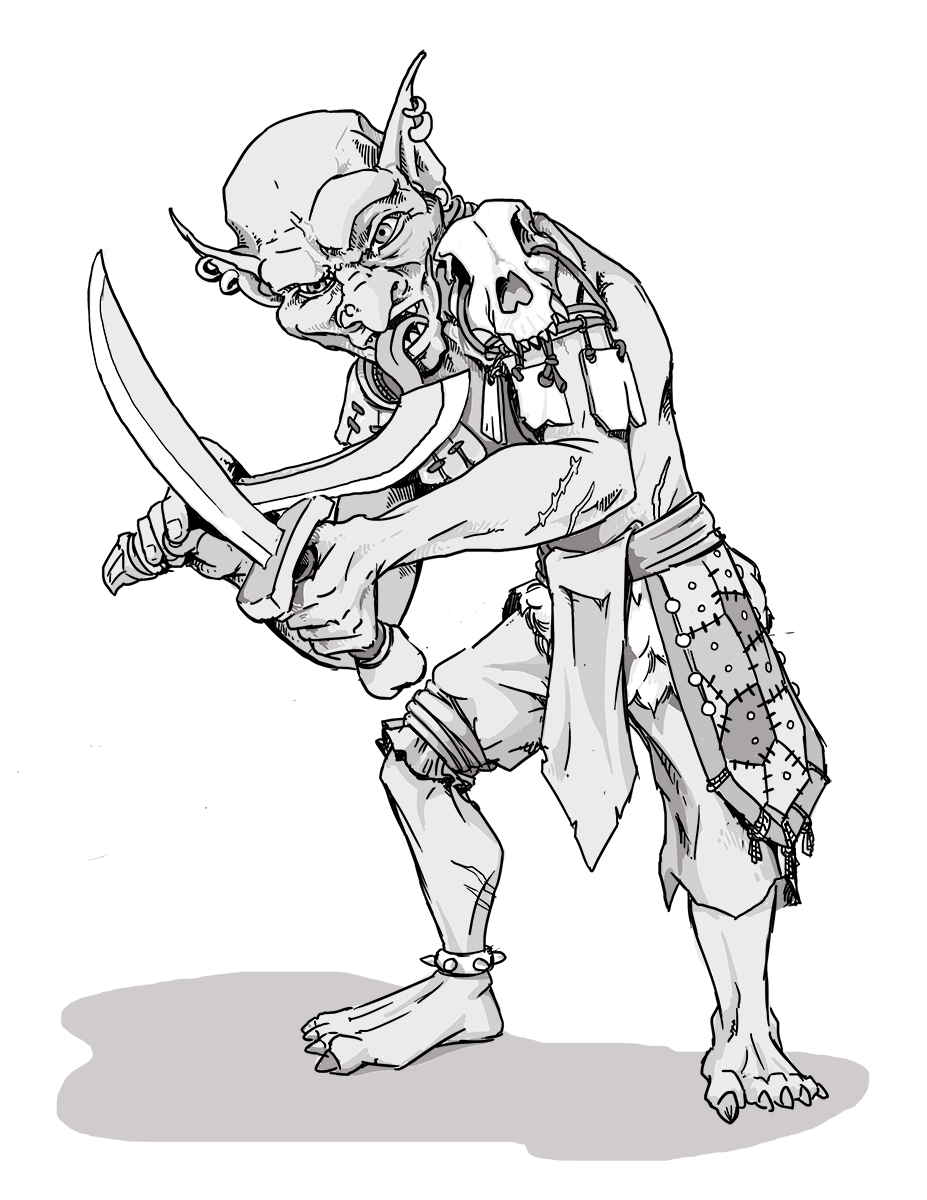
- First appearance: The Dungeons & Dragons "white box" set (1974)
- Based on: Goblin

In-universe information
- Type: Humanoid
- Alignment: Usually Neutral Evil

In the Dungeons & Dragons fantasy role-playing game, goblins are a common and fairly weak race of evil humanoid monsters. Goblins are non-human monsters that low-level player characters often face in combat.

== Influences ==
Goblins in Dungeons & Dragons are based primarily on the goblins portrayed in J.R.R. Tolkien's Middle-Earth. Goblins are presented as "evil" and "predisposed towards a society of brutal regimes where the strongest rule" in the game. In turn, D&D's goblins influenced later portrayals in games and fiction, such as the tabletop wargame Warhammer Fantasy Battle. They have also been compared to German kobolds. Unlike the goblins in Tolkien's works, the goblins of D&D are a separate race from orcs; instead, they are a part of the related species collectively referred to as "goblinoids", which includes hobgoblins, bugbears, and others.

== Publication history ==
The goblin first appeared in the fantasy supplement to the original "Chainmail" set, prior to appearing in the original Dungeons & Dragons game.

=== Dungeons & Dragons (1974–1976) ===
The goblin was one of the first monsters introduced in the earliest edition of the game, the Dungeons & Dragons "white box" set (1974), where they were described simply as small monsters.

=== Advanced Dungeons & Dragons 1st edition (1977–1988) ===
The goblin appears in the first edition Monster Manual (1977), where it is described as having a tribal society and dwelling in dismal surroundings. They also appeared in the video game Pool of Radiance (1988), with the depiction directly derived from that book.

The mythology and attitudes of the goblins are described in detail in Dragon #63 (July 1982), in Roger E. Moore's article, "The Humanoids."

In the article "Hey, Wanna Be a Kobold?" by Joseph Clay in Dragon #141 (January 1989), kobolds, xvarts, goblins, and orcs were presented as player character races along with two new character classes the "Shaman" and the "Witch Doctor".

=== Dungeons & Dragons (1977–1999) ===
This edition of the D&D game included its own version of the goblin, in the Dungeons & Dragons Basic Set (1977, 1981, 1983). The goblin was featured as a player character race in the gazetteer The Orcs of Thar (1989). Goblins were also later featured in the Dungeons & Dragons Game set (1991), the Dungeons & Dragons Rules Cyclopedia (1991), the Classic Dungeons & Dragons Game set (1994), and the Dungeons & Dragons Adventure Game set (1999).

=== Advanced Dungeons & Dragons 2nd edition (1989–1999) ===
The goblin appears first in the Monstrous Compendium Volume One (1989), and is reprinted in the Monstrous Manual (1993).

The goblin is detailed as a playable character race in The Complete Book of Humanoids (1993). The book notes that goblins cannot be wizards. The goblin is later presented as a playable character race again in Player's Option: Skills & Powers (1995), and in the module Reverse Dungeon (2000).

The goblyn, a related creature in the Ravenloft campaign setting, appeared in the module Feast of Goblyns (1990), and the Monstrous Compendium Ravenloft Appendix (1991).

The Cerilian goblin for the Birthright campaign setting appeared in the Birthright Campaign Setting set (1995), and was reprinted in Monstrous Compendium Annual Three (1996).

=== Dungeons & Dragons 3.0 edition (2000–2002) ===
The goblin appears in the Monster Manual for this edition (2000).

Tactics for fighting goblins were described in "Vs. Goblins", by Bruce Cordell, in Dragon #275 (2000).

The Dekanter goblin was introduced in Monsters of Faerun (2000). Races of Faerûn (2003) presented the goblin and Dekanter goblin as player character races for the Forgotten Realms campaign setting.

The blue, a psionic relative of the goblin, appeared in the Psionics Handbook (2001).

The goblyn of Ravenloft appeared for this edition in Denizens of Darkness (2002).

=== Dungeons & Dragons 3.5 edition (2003–2007) ===
The goblin appears in the revised Monster Manual for this edition (2003).

The blue appeared in the Expanded Psionics Handbook (2004).

The air goblin, the aquatic goblin, the arctic goblin, the desert goblin, and the jungle goblin were all introduced in Unearthed Arcana (2004). Monster Manual III (2004) introduced the forestkith goblin. The snow goblin appeared in Frostburn: Mastering the Perils of Ice and Snow (2004). The dark goblin appeared in Tome of Magic (2006). The vril, and the goblin flesh-herder appeared in Drow of the Underdark (2007).

The goblyn of Ravenloft was updated to this edition in Denizens of Dread (2004), but also appeared again in the Campaign Classics feature in Dragon #339 (January 2006).

=== Dungeons & Dragons 4th edition (2008–2014) ===
The goblin appears in the Monster Manual for this edition (2008), including the goblin cutter, the goblin blackblade, the goblin warrior, the goblin sharpshooter, the goblin hexer, the goblin skullcleaver, and the goblin underboss. The bugbear and the hobgoblin also appear under the goblin entry in this edition's Monster Manual.

=== Dungeons & Dragons 5th edition (2014–present) ===
Goblins feature in the first segment of the adventure Lost Mine of Phandelver, included in the 5th edition Dungeons & Dragons Starter Set (2014). The goblin also appears in the Monster Manual for this edition (2014), including the goblin boss. In Volo's Guide to Monsters Goblins, Hobgoblins, and Bugbears were featured as playable races under Monstrous Races. Goblins were presented as a playable race in the Guildmasters' Guide to Ravnica, the "Magic: The Gathering crossovers Plane Shift: Ixalan and Plane Shift: Zendikar", as well as in Mordenkainen Presents: Monsters of the Multiverse, which also featured a more detailed backstory, antagonist versions and related creatures to the goblins.

== Description ==
In Dungeons & Dragons, goblins are small humanoid monsters. They vary in height from about 3 ft 0 in (0.91 m) to 3 ft 0.5 in (0.93 m) and weigh 40–45 pounds (18–20 kg). They walk upright even though their arms nearly reach their knees. Their eyes vary from red to yellow and are usually dull and glazed. Described as "hideously ugly", they have a broad nose that sits on a flat face with pointed ears and a wide mouth. Their mouth contains small, but sharp fangs. Their skin pigment ranges from a deep red through nearly any shade of orange to yellow. Members of the same tribe tend to have the same skin color.

=== Society ===
Goblins usually live in tribes which are ruled by the strongest goblin in the group. These tribes vary in size from gangs of 4–9 to tribes of up to 400. Most larger tribes have wolves or dire wolves as mounts, or ally themselves with worgs, which also carry them into battle. Goblin tribes usually settle near civilized areas to raid for food, livestock, tools, weapons, and supplies. It is common for the leaders of goblin clans to be non-goblin (either other goblinoids or a different species entirely); such leaders are exploiting the goblins as disposable soldiers to further their purpose.

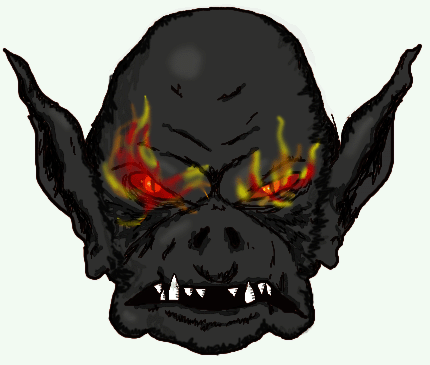
Maglubiyet, chief deity of goblins in most campaign settings

In most campaign settings, Maglubiyet, the god of war and rulership, is the chief deity of goblins. In the 5th edition book Monsters of the Multiverse his backstory is expanded so "that Maglubiyet actually conquered the goblinoids" and corrupted them from their original fae form, but "was not their original godly ancestor."

Other gods worshipped by the goblins include Khurgorbaeyag, the god of slavery, oppression, and morale, and Bargrivyek, the god of co-operation and territory.

Deities of other goblin races include Meriadar (deity of patience, tolerance, meditation, and arts and crafts) and Stalker (deity of hate, death, and cold), as well as the hobgoblin god Nomog-Geaya (deity of War and Authority), the bugbear gods Hruggek (deity of violence and combat), Grankhul (deity of hunting, senses, and surprise), and Skiggaret (deity of fear), as well as Kikanuti the goddess of the desert goblins, known as bhukas.

== Goblin sub-races ==
Sub-races of goblin in Dungeons & Dragons include the snow goblin, the aquatic goblin, and the jungle goblin, each adapted to a particular environment.

=== Nilbog ===
Nilbogs are, according to the game description, a type of naturally-born but magical goblins that are healed by receiving damage and are damaged by healing spells. Furthermore, they project a paradox area effect in whose radius every intended action is twisted so that the exact opposite is carried out (i.e.: instead of hitting a nilbog with a weapon, one might end up attacking a companion; or instead of plundering a treasure hoard, an adventuring party under the influence of "nilbogism" might actually end up adding their own wealth to it). The name of this sub-species is "goblin" spelled backward, a reference to this reversal of effects.

=== Verdan ===
Introduced in the Acquisitions Incorporated supplement, the Verdan are a race of goblins subject to constant magical mutations due to a connection to a chaotic force of magic. The Verdan are notably taller than other goblins and less monstrous in appearance. Mutations, occurring at random throughout their lifespans, can cause changes to eye color, skin color, hair color, gender and/or sex. They live far longer than any other goblinoid, comfortably over two centuries. As a race, they are nomads, and their traveling has made them less prone to pettiness and violence than their other goblin cousins.

== Other publishers ==
Goblins feature prominently in material for the Pathfinder Roleplaying Game from Paizo Publishing, which is based on the Dungeons & Dragons 3.5 rules. The goblins in Pathfinder, as detailed in Paizo's books Classic Monsters Revisited (2008) and Goblins of Golarion (2011), have a distinct characterization from their Dungeons & Dragons counterparts; reviewers have described them as "walking bundles of chaos and crazy".

Pathfinder's goblins are also central to Paizo's Free RPG Day modules We Be Goblins! (2011), We Be Goblins Too! (2013) and We Be Goblins Free! (2015), which feature goblins as player characters, as well as the licensed Dynamite Entertainment comic Pathfinder: Goblins!

== In other media ==
Goblins are the protagonists in the Dungeons & Dragons-influenced webcomic Goblins. Goblins also feature prominently in another Dungeons & Dragons-influenced work, The Order of the Stick; a major antagonist, Redcloak, is a goblin cleric serving a deity known as the "Dark One".

A "Goblin Lair" is used as one of the sample encounters in the book Dungeon Master 4th Edition for Dummies.

== Reception ==
Scott Baird from Screen Rant compiled a list of the game's "10 Most Powerful (And 10 Weakest) Monsters, Ranked" in 2018, calling this one of the weakest, saying "Goblins are purposely designed to be weak and ineffective in combat so that they can fulfill their role as the tutorial battle of Dungeons & Dragons." Baird also found goblins the most stereotypical of choices for a combat encounter for beginning characters.

Bleeding Cool perceived the goblin as among "the more distinctive race options in the D&D multiverse" and Syfy Wire considered it among the players' "favorites", while Comic Book Resources counted the goblin as # 10 on the list of "10 Powerful Monster Species That You Should Play As", stating that "They're pretty much everywhere in a fantasy setting and have so many variations that it is unlikely to not fit in a campaign. The traditional goblin is the equivalent of an internet troll, smallish, angry, looking to bully those it can and flee if the confrontation goes badly."

Paul Karczag and Lawrence Schick counted the goblin among the "five main "humanoid" races" in AD&D.

Cyril Pasteau for Backstab found goblins suitable opponents for characters of the lowest level.

A.V. Club reviewer Nick Wanserski praised the "thoughtful" look on goblins provided in Volo's Guide to Monsters: While "such staples as orcs, goblins, and kobolds [...] often get lumped together as a dull monolith", the many details here give "a lot of personality to an otherwise easily forgettable monster." As a player character race CGMagazine contributor Chris de Hoog considered the "monster-based" goblins among the "more unconventional" options.
