= The Complete Book of Humanoids =

1993 role-playing game supplement

- Author: Bill Slavicsek
- Genre: Role-playing game
- Publisher: TSR
- Publication date: 1993

The Complete Book of Humanoids is a sourcebook for the second edition of the Advanced Dungeons & Dragons fantasy adventure role-playing game.

== Contents ==
The Complete Book of Humanoids is a supplement which details rules for monstrous races so that they can be used for player characters.

The races included in this handbook are: aarakocra, alaghi, beastman, bugbear, bullywug, centaur, fremlin, giant-kin (firbolg), fremlin, gnoll, gnoll (flind), goblin, hobgoblin, kobold, lizard man, minotaur, mongrelman, ogre, half-ogre, orc, half-orc, pixie, satyr, saurial (bladeback, finhead, flyer, hornhead), swanmay, giant-kin (voadkyn), and wemic.

== Publication history ==
The Complete Book of Humanoids was written by Bill Slavicsek for TSR. Published in 1993, the editing was by Jon Pickens, black and white art by Doug Chaffee, and color art by Chaffee, Sam Rakeland, Thomas Baxa, and Clyde Caldwell.

== Reception ==
Mike Lampman reviewed The Complete Book of Humanoids in Shadis No. 9 and said that "overall, the Humanoid handbook is a good investment if you're an AD&D player, or GM, looking to spice up your campaign by playing something a little out of the ordinary. It's well written, and edited, as most of the TSR products are, and is laid out nicely."

Keith Eisenbeis reviewed the product in a 1993 issue of White Wolf. He noted challenges with monster descriptions and some errors, but was generally positive about the product, stating that it is "worth buying for anyone willing to take on the challenge of roleplaying a monster". He rated it overall at a 3 out of 5 possible points.

Rick Swan reviewed The Complete Book of Humanoids for Dragon magazine No. 205 (May 1994). Swan considered the book a "major shake-up in the AD&D rules," as the Player's Handbook only allowed players the option of six player character races, while this book adds 20 more character race options. He notes that the book imposes restrictions to maintain game balance: "PCs can't be undead, nor can they be monsters taller than 12 feet. Centaur wizards can't go beyond 12th level; goblins can't be wizards at all." Swan also notes the difficulties involved in playing non-standard races, citing having a member of a typically evil race existing in a lawful good society, or how very tall characters might get around areas with low ceilings. However, he felt that adventurous players would appreciate the book, and closed the review by saying, "Who could pass up the chance to play a pixie?"

Trenton Webb of the British RPG magazine Arcane asserts that the shaman class from this book consists of "pilfered priests spells and mumbo jumbo".

An article by James Wyatt in Dragon No. 250 (August 1998) presented rules for using various aquatic races as player characters, including crabmen, koalinth, locathah, malenti, merfolk, pahari, selkies, and vodyanoi using the format presented in The Complete Book of Humanoids. Wyatt acknowledged that "The Complete Book of Humanoids broke a long-standing barrier in the AD&D game by allowing players to make characters of nearly any humanoid race," and noted that the book carefully balanced the advantages a race might have such as great physical strength against significant disadvantages, particularly prejudice and superstition from the more common races. Player characters based on the creatures presented in this article would face the same sort of prejudices, as well as special physical limitations while interacting with land dwellers.

== Reviews ==
- Casus Belli #94
