= Jon Pickens =

American role-playing game designer

- Born: Jon Pickens; August 12, 1954 (age 72); Mishawaka, Indiana, United States
- Occupations: Game designer, editor
- Writing career
- Genre: Role-playing games

Jon Pickens is an American game designer and editor who has worked on numerous products for the Dungeons & Dragons fantasy role-playing game from TSR and later Wizards of the Coast.

== Early life and education ==
Jon Pickens was born in Mishawaka, Indiana on August 12, 1954. In 1968, he was introduced to miniatures wargaming, and his parents bought him the Blitzkrieg wargame for Christmas that year. A couple of months later, Pickens responded to an ad in Popular Mechanics for a magazine titled Strategy & Tactics. He wrote in for a sample copy, and “spent the rest of the summer mowing lawns to get enough money to buy some wargames advertised in the magazine, and to get all the back issues.” The publishers did not carry back issues, “So I wrote a letter to this collector, whose name was Gary Gygax, and arranged to buy the back issues from him. Gary invited me to attend a gaming convention in Madison. By a coincidence, my father had a speaking engagement in Delavan, which is near Lake Geneva, on the same weekend, so he took me up.” Pickens and Gary Gygax drove up to Madison, and Gygax later invited him to the Gen Con convention; Pickens attended beginning with Gen Con 3 and for many years after that.

Pickens attended Valparaiso University, and in 1976 he earned a B.A. degree in English and Economics. He continued to attend conventions while in college, and discovered TSR's new Chainmail miniatures game at the 1973 Gen Con; the following year, TSR debuted the Dungeons & Dragons fantasy role-playing game. After college, Pickens began writing occasional articles for Dragon magazine, and was active in the Alarums & Excursions publication.

== Career ==
Pickens eventually applied for a job at TSR, taking both the designer and editor tests, and was hired as an editor. “They didn’t think much of the design work, probably because I wrote it in a few hours late at night, but the editing part was OK,” said Pickens. Pickens later became the Acquisition Editor for TSR, Inc., reviewing modules for possible publication. He was also the Games Editor for Strategy & Tactics Magazine for several years while the magazine was published by TSR, and later the Managing Editor as well, commenting “In a way, this completes a circle in my life.”

Jon Pickens has worked on many game products for the Dungeons & Dragons game since 1978, as an editor, designer, coordinator, and creative director. Some of his works as a game designer include the original Arms & Equipment Guide, and design contributions to the third edition Player's Handbook, Monster Manual, and Dungeon Masters Guide. He has edited many Dungeons & Dragons books, including notably the Castle Greyhawk module, and the Rules Cyclopedia.

Pickens and David "Zeb" Cook oversaw the development of the book Night of the Seven Swords (1986). Pickens was known for often being a "go-to research guy" at TSR. For Aurora's Whole Realms Catalog (1992) he assisted J. Robert King's research by providing his own personal library. In preparing the campaign setting book Al-Qadim: Arabian Adventures (1992), Pickens provided Jeff Grubb with three boxes of reference and research material.

While Pickens left the gaming industry in the early 2000s, his nephew, Robert DeHoff, remains in that field and acts as a playtester and writer for Catalyst Game Labs's BattleTech, Cosmic Patrol, and Leviathans game lines.
