= Monster Manual IV =

Tabletop role-playing game supplement

- Monster Manual IV cover
- Author: Gwendolyn F.M. Kestrel
- Genre: Role-playing game
- Publisher: Wizards of the Coast
- Publication date: July 2006
- Media type: Print (Hardback)
- Pages: 224
- ISBN: 0-7869-3920-6

Monster Manual IV is an optional supplemental source book for the Dungeons & Dragons (D&D) role-playing game.

== Contents ==
As with other Monster Manual supplements, MM4 contains a variety of new creatures as well as expanded variants on staple D&D monsters such as orcs, demons, yuan-ti, and gnolls. What separates it from past volumes is the level of detail given to each creature subtype, including probable behavior in combat and even a complete pre-prepared encounter complete with a map. While the 'standard' entry still clocks in around two pages, many of the 'expanded' entries are four pages or longer, with the 'Spawn of Tiamat' section going on for nearly forty pages, or 20% of the entire volume. This results in fewer overall monster entries, which proved unpopular among many D&D players.

Each entry also contains a table listing DC ratings for skill checks made using the Knowledge ability. In general, a low DC check results in revealing all the monster's subtype traits to the player, while higher ratings reveal their origins or various special offensive and defensive abilities.

This book was also published in the v3.5 format and used the new stat block format that was introduced in the Dungeon Master's Guide II. Monster Manual IV contained fewer actual monsters than Monster Manual II and III, but had sample lairs and encounters for them, gave stats for classes and templates applied to old creatures, and full page maps. The book also ties into the "Year of the Dragons" theme that Wizards of the Coast planned out for 2006 with the Spawn of Tiamat, yet contains no new monsters that are considered true dragons.

== Publication history ==
Monster Manual IV, published July 2006, was designed by Gwendolyn F.M. Kestrel, Jennifer Clarke Wilkes, Matthew Sernett, Eric Cagle, Andrew Finch, Christopher Lindsay, Kolja Raven Liquette, Chris Sims, Owen K.C. Stephens, Travis Stout, JD Wiker, and Skip Williams. Cover art was by Henry Higginbotham, with interior art by Daarken, Wayne England, Carl Frank, David Hudnut, Howard Lyon, Raven Mimura, Jim Nelson, Steve Prescott, Wayne Reynolds, Ron Spencer, Anne Stokes, Arnie Swekel, Francis Tsai, Eva Widermann, Sam Wood, and James Zhang.
