= Skip Williams =

American role-playing game designer

Skip Williams at Dragon Con in Atlanta on September 4 2026

Ralph Williams, almost always referred to as Skip Williams, is an American game designer. He is married to Penny Williams, who is also involved with the games industry. He was the co-creator of Dungeons & Dragons 3rd Edition and the longtime author of the "Sage Advice" column for Dragon Magazine.

== Career ==
Born in Lake Geneva, Wisconsin, Williams was informally acquainted with many of the people who developed and influenced the original Dungeons & Dragons game, going to school with Gary Gygax's son Ernie and participating in a gaming group that Gary used to playtest some of the AD&D rules. Williams started out working as a part-time clerk in TSR's Dungeon Hobby Shop in 1976. Williams first worked for TSR in an administrative capacity, working as a cashier, in shipping, and doing various office tasks. Williams directed the Gen Con game fair from 1980-1983. Williams was laid off after a time but continued to work for TSR in a freelance role, performing odd jobs; it was in this circumstance in 1987 that he came to write "Sage Advice" in the pages of Dragon - Williams recalls that Dragon editor Roger E. Moore simply couldn't find anyone else willing to regularly write the column. Williams held the position until 2004. In 1989, Williams joined the RPGA staff for a few years before becoming a roleplaying game designer for TSR. From 1990 to 1992 he was also Associate Editor of Polyhedron magazine.

When TSR was purchased by Wizards of the Coast, he moved from Wisconsin to Washington. Williams was promoted to Senior Designer, and worked on the 3rd Edition design team with Monte Cook and Jonathan Tweet. Cook, Tweet, and Williams all contributed to the 3rd edition Players Handbook, Dungeon Master's Guide, and Monster Manual, and then each designer wrote one of the books based on those contributions. Williams also worked on the new edition of the Forgotten Realms campaign setting. Although he was released from Wizards of the Coast in 2002 and has since moved back to Wisconsin, he continued to produce D&D and d20 material on a freelance basis up until 2005. His publications from this time include "Cry Havoc!" published by Monte Cook's Malhavoc Press and Races of the Wild from Wizards of the Coast. He has appeared as the author of the "Ask The Kobold" column for Kobold Quarterly.

In 2015, he agreed to write scenarios for the Kickstarter "Dungeon of the Day", a Megaton Games production.

Williams and his wife Penny live in rural Wisconsin in a century-old farmhouse surrounded by several acres of abandoned farmland.
