= The Orcs of Thar =

Tabletop role-playing game supplement for Dungeons & Dragons

- Author: Bruce Heard
- Genre: Role-playing game
- Publisher: TSR, Inc.
- Publication date: 1988

The Orcs of Thar is an accessory for the Dungeons & Dragons fantasy role-playing game, written by Bruce Heard and published by TSR in 1988.

== Publication history ==
The Orcs of Thar (GAZ10) was written by Bruce Heard, with cover art by Clyde Caldwell, and interior illustrations by Jim Holloway. It was published by TSR in 1988 and included two 48-page books, a large color map, cardstock counters, and an outer folder. Editing was by Gary L. Thomas, and cartography by Dave Sutherland. The Orcs of Thar was the tenth in TSR's series of D&D Gazetteers; each Gazetteer detailed part of D&D's Known World campaign setting, providing information on culture, society, history, geography, economics, and prominent NPCs of a given nation. The "Orc Wars" board game first appeared in Dragon Issue 132, although the game's counters in The Orcs of Thar are printed on heavier stock than was used in the magazine.

== Contents ==
The Orcs of Thar is a campaign setting book that details the fictional Broken Lands that are inhabited by humanoids such as orcs, goblins, and bugbears. The "Player's Guide" is written for using orcs as player characters, and includes a description of the how orcs view the world, an overview covering the Broken Lands, rules for character creation, and a section called "Thar's Manual of Good Conduct". The "Players' Guide" provides the history of the various humanoid races as seen through their own eyes, and describes the situation in the Broken Lands with an account of the ten tribes, their beliefs, and the areas they inhabit. It includes rules for generating humanoid player characters such as kobolds, goblins, orcs, hobgoblins, gnolls, bugbears, ogres, and trolls. Tables and suggestions for generating height, physical appearance, outlook, and various skills are available to add depth to the characters. "Thar's Manual of Good Conduct", a guide to portraying characters' obnoxious behavior and battle-lust, comes as part of the "Players' Guide" but is intended to be pulled out of the booklet, cut up, and stapled into a smaller booklet.

The "Orcs of Thar" booklet includes information on orcish shamans, important leaders of the humanoid tribes, how to run campaigns in the Broken Lands, and an adventure scenario. The gazetteer includes rules for adaptation the set to Advanced Dungeons & Dragons, and rules for a simple conquest board game for orcs. The "Dungeon Master’s Booklet" gives the “real” history of the humanoids and details on the major NPCs in the Broken Lands. It includes new rules for playing shamans and wiccas as character classes, as well as nonhuman spell-casters described in the D&D Master Set, clerics and magic-users of the humanoid races. The "Dungeon Master’s Booklet" provides information about the best way to stage and present humanoid adventures, along with adventure outlines. It presents details of the orcish city Oenkmar, allowing humanoids and humans to explore, and lists the rules for tlachtli, a ball game played in Oenkmar.

The board game included is called Orc Wars, and is set in and around the Broken Lands and features a power struggle to become the top humanoid.

== Reception ==
Jim Bambra reviewed The Orcs of Thar for Dragon magazine #148 (August 1989). Bambra wrote that the original 1974 version of D&D gave "very skimpy" guidelines on using monsters as player characters, and that subsequent editions became more human and demihuman oriented. With The Orcs of Thar, "the D&D game returns to its roots by allowing players to take on the roles of monsters: dirty, smelly, depraved humanoids, the kind of scum that players love to hate. [...] Now, The Orcs of Thar gives the opportunity to play the bad guys in a detailed and humorous campaign." He considered the material "fun to read and informative", which "does an excellent job of describing the lifestyles of orcs and other humanoids". He enjoyed Jim Holloway's "fun-filled art", which does "an excellent job of capturing the flavor of humanoid life". Bambra stated that the character generation system handles the different types of humanoid creatures in a smooth and integrated manner: "Being big has its advantages, since you start with more Hit Dice than the other creatures, but it takes you far longer to gain additional Hit Dice than it does for the lowly kobolds, goblins, or orcs." He wrote that the adventure outlines "do a superb job of capturing the flavor and atmosphere of humanoid adventuring, with plenty of opportunities for groveling and attacking the hated humans". He also called the "Orc Wars" board game "good fun". Bambra concluded the review by saying, "The Orcs of Thar combines neat monster descriptions and backgrounds with a colorful and humorous narrative style of presentation. Couple this with its high-quality graphic presentation, and you end up with a product that no one should be without. The Orcs of Thar is wonderfully conceived and executed. Even if the idea of having humanoid characters doesn’t appeal to you, the background material in The Orcs of Thar still makes it a valuable contribution to your campaign."

According to Lawrence Schick in his 1991 book Heroic Worlds, The Orcs of Thar is "written in a humorous style that presents orcs as lovable goofballs who just happen to enjoy slaughter and pillage".
