= Greyhawk (supplement) =

Tabletop role-playing game supplement for Dungeons & Dragons

Dungeons & Dragons Supplement I: Greyhawk
- The original Greyhawk booklet by Gygax and Kuntz
- Authors: Gary Gygax; Robert J. Kuntz
- Genre: Role-playing game
- Publisher: TSR, Inc.
- Publication date: 1975
- Pages: 68

Greyhawk is a rules supplement written by Gary Gygax and Robert J. Kuntz and published for the original edition of the Dungeons & Dragons (D&D) fantasy role-playing game. It has been called "the first and most important supplement" to the original D&D rules. Although the name of the book was taken from the home campaign supervised by Gygax and Kuntz based on Gygax's imagined Castle Greyhawk and the lands surrounding it, Greyhawk did not give any details of the castle or the campaign world; instead, it explained the rules that Gygax and Kuntz used in their home campaign, and introduced a number of character classes, spells, concepts and monsters used in all subsequent editions of D&D.

== Contents ==
The original rules for Dungeons & Dragons were published by TSR in 1974, but were limited in scope: the character classes and monsters listed were small in number; and for combat rules, players needed to have a copy of Chainmail, a rulebook for miniatures wargames published by Guidon Games in 1971. Over the next two years, TSR bolstered the original rules with five supplemental books. Greyhawk was the first of these supplements, named after Gary Gygax's home campaign.

The 2004 publication 30 Years of Adventure: A Celebration of Dungeons & Dragons suggested that details of Gygax's Greyhawk campaign were published in this booklet. However Gygax had no plans in 1975 to publish details of the Greyhawk world, since he believed that new players of Dungeons & Dragons would rather create their own worlds than use someone else's. In addition, he did not want to publish all the material he had created for his players; he thought he would be unlikely to recoup a fair investment for the thousands of hours he had spent on it, and since his secrets would be revealed to his players, he would be forced to recreate a new world for them afterward. In fact the only two references to the Greyhawk campaign were an illustration of a large stone head in a dungeon corridor titled The Great Stone Face, Enigma of Greyhawk and mention of a fountain on the second level of the dungeons that continuously issued an endless number of snakes.

Greyhawk instead focused on new game rules that had been developed by Gygax and Kuntz during long hours of home play. The 68-page supplement also introduced new character classes (thief and paladin), as well as new rules for combat, spells, monsters, and treasure. Greyhawk included new rules regarding weapon damage with different amounts of damage dealt by each weapon. The supplement presented more types of treasure and magic items, and included new spells, going up to 7th, 8th, and 9th level. The supplement also contained a section for monsters, and introduced many new monsters including the lizard men, beholders, displacer beasts, blink dogs, and carrion crawlers.

== Publication history ==
Greyhawk was already in process at the time of TSR co-founder Don Kaye's death in January 1975, and was published in early March. It was designated Supplement I and given a product designation of TSR 2003. Many of the new rules presented in the supplement eventually became standard AD&D rules. A second supplement, Blackmoor, followed later the same year.

Illustrations for the supplement were provided by Greg Bell, who had previously met Gygax while playing wargames, and had already provided some illustrations for the original Dungeons & Dragons boxed set. Gygax often contacted Bell at the last minute for artwork; as a result, Bell sometimes responded by copying figures from the pages of comic books. His illustration of a sword-wielding warrior on the cover of the Greyhawk supplement is a copy of "Dax the Damned" by Esteban Maroto from a 1974 issue of Eerie.

Ready Ref Sheets (1977) from Judges Guild collected 20 pages of charts that were taken from the original D&D boxed set, as well as Chainmail and Greyhawk. Material from Greyhawk, along with the original D&D and the Blackmoor and Eldritch Wizardry supplements, was revised by J. Eric Holmes for the Dungeons & Dragons Basic Set (1977).

In 2013, the Greyhawk supplement was reproduced as part of a premium reprint of the original "White Box" D&D rules. Each booklet comes with new cover art but otherwise reproduces the original content faithfully.

== Reception ==
Lawrence Schick, in his 1991 book Heroic Worlds, calls Greyhawk "The first and most important supplement to Original D&D".

Shannon Appelcline, in his 2011 book Designers & Dragons, considers Greyhawk an "innovation" because at the time "supplements were largely unheard of in the wargaming industry. Though games were frequently revised and reprinted, continually expanding a game was something new."

Journalist David M. Ewalt wrote that the supplement helped dungeon masters to learn how to create adventures through examples, bridging "the gap between players who learned the game at Gary's table and those who picked it up in a hobby store." Ewalt valued that Greyhawk showed that Dungeons & Dragons was meant to be adapted and evolved by the players beyond the original rules to make it most suitable for each individual gaming group.

== Reviews ==
- The Playboy Winner's Guide to Board Games

== See also ==
- World of Greyhawk Fantasy Game Setting
