= Terry Dykstra =

Terry Dykstra is an artist whose work has appeared in role-playing games.

== Works ==
Terry Dykstra produced interior illustrations for many Dungeons & Dragons books and issues of Dragon magazine throughout the 1990s.

Dykstra also illustrated a number of Endless Quest gamebook series.
