= Savage Species =

2003 role-playing game supplement

- Author: David Eckelbarry, Rich Redman, Jennifer Clarke Wilkes
- Genre: Role-playing game
- Publisher: Wizards of the Coast
- Publication date: February 2003
- Media type: Print (Hardcover)
- Pages: 224
- ISBN: 0-7869-2648-1
- OCLC: 51733855

Savage Species is a sourcebook for use as a supplement in the 3rd edition of the Dungeons & Dragons game, detailing the use of monstrous races as PC races.

== Contents ==
Savage Species introduces classes and outlines rules for playing monstrous races as player characters (PCs), and introduces taking racial levels in the player character's race instead of in a given class.

== Publication history ==
Savage Species was written by David Eckelberry, Rich Redman, and Jennifer Clarke Wilkes, and was published in 2003. Cover art was by Jeff Easley, with interior art by Dennis Cramer, Brian Despain, Emily Fiegenschuh, Jeremy Jarvis, John and Laura Lakey, Alan Pollack, Vinod Rams, Wayne Reynolds, David Roach, Scott Roller, Mark Sasso, Arnie Swekel and Sam Wood.

Wilkes proposed the project in 2000, "after a closing seminar at Gen Con in which a number of players suggested a supplement book about playing monsters as characters". The project was approved in early 2001 and the designers started writing in the fall of 2001. Savage Species began as a guide to playing monsters as PCs but, during the design process, became a book to assist Dungeon Masters in creating monster non-player characters as well.

== Reception ==
The reviewer from Pyramid commented: "Savage Species opens up new avenues of play by allowing nearly any creature in the MM to be used as a player character race. The heart of the system presented in the book is rules to determine the effective character level any given monster." The reviewer add that the system is "simple and straightforward, and the rules include several examples".

Shannon Appelcline identified Savage Species as one of "lots of one-off books" to support the 3.0 edition of Dungeons & Dragons, contrasting them with 3.5 in which "Wizards carefully aligned its books into well-recognised and salable series".

== Reviews ==
- Black Gate #6
- Backstab #45 (as "Guide des personnages monstrueux")
- Dragão Brasil
- Realms of Fantasy
