= The New Easy to Master Dungeons & Dragons Game =

The New Easy-to-Master Dungeons & Dragons Game
- Genre: Role-playing games
- Publisher: TSR
- Publication date: 1991
- Media type: Boxed set

The New Easy to Master Dungeons & Dragons Game is an introductory set for the Dungeons & Dragons fantasy role-playing game, published by TSR, Inc. in 1991. It was a replacement for the previous Dungeons & Dragons Basic Set, serving to introduce new players to the game, using the rule set previously established.

== Contents ==
The rules are presented twice, once in a 64-page rule book and again in the Dungeon Card Learning Pack. Inspired by the SRA reading program, the pack is a set of 48 cards that also includes four-page supplementary mini-adventures. The front of each card features a discussion of a single facet of the rules, such as non-player characters, hit dice, or initiative rolls. The back of the card describes a brief scenario to illustrate the rules discussed on the front. The four-page mini-adventures that pop up in the card pack at regular intervals incorporate the rules discussed up to that point into a linked series of encounters that give a beginning Dungeon Master a chance to hone his skills. The encounters include directions for setting up character pawns on the map, boxed text to be read to the players, and a list of responses to the probable actions of the PCs. The set also includes a Dungeon Master's Screen, fold-up cardboard pawns, a color map sheet, and dice.

== Publication history ==
Design was by Troy Denning, and the rule book written by Timothy B. Brown. The cover was by Jeff Easley, with interior illustrations by Terry Dykstra. It was reissued in 1994 with different cover art and box shape. This version was entitled The Classic Dungeons & Dragons Game.

== Reception ==
Gene Alloway reviewed the Dungeons & Dragons complete boxed edition roleplaying game in White Wolf #34 (Jan./Feb., 1993), rating it a 4 out of 5 and stated that "This is the best introductory game for roleplaying I have seen. It is a complete starter kit, right down to the dice. It is a quality product, and one needed by the hobby for a while. In addition, the board, scenarios and pieces help a new player make the transition between traditional board games and the wide world of roleplaying."
