= Monster Manual =

Sourcebook series of Dungeons & Dragons bestiaries

Monster Manual (1977)
- Cover of the original Monster Manual
- Author: Gary Gygax
- Genre: Role-playing game
- Publisher: TSR
- Publication date: December 1977
- Media type: Print (Hardback)
- Pages: 112
- ISBN: 0-935696-00-8 (4th printing)
- Dewey Decimal: 794
- LC Class: GV1469.D8G93 1979
- Followed by: Monster Manual II

The Monster Manual (MM) is the primary bestiary sourcebook for monsters in the Dungeons & Dragons (D&D) fantasy role-playing game, first published in 1977 by TSR. The Monster Manual was the first hardcover D&D book and includes monsters derived from mythology and folklore, as well as creatures created specifically for D&D. Creature descriptions include game-specific statistics (such as the monster's level or number of hit dice), a brief description of its habits and habitats, and typically an image of the creature. Along with the Player's Handbook and Dungeon Master's Guide, the Monster Manual is one of the three "core rulebooks" in most editions of the D&D game. As such, new editions of the Monster Manual have been released for each edition of D&D. Due to the level of detail and illustration included in the 1977 release, the book was cited as a pivotal example of a new style of wargame books. Future editions would draw on various sources and act as a compendium of published monsters.

== Early Dungeons & Dragons ==
The first D&D boxed set did not have a separate Monster Manual but provided listings for monsters in Book 2: Monsters and Treasure, one of the included booklets. After the series was separated into basic and advanced games, the basic game continued to be published in level-based boxes. Monsters of the appropriate level were included in the rulebooks for the various basic game sets (the Basic, Expert, Companion, Master, and Immortal sets). These monsters were later collected in the Rules Cyclopedia, which replaced the higher-level boxed sets, and the Creature Catalogue.

=== Creative origins ===
Games scholar Jaroslav Švelch saw the Monster Manual modeled after "medieval bestiaries, only with more precise figures": "Whereas medieval bestiaries attempted to situate unknown creatures within what was the known system of nature, games like Dungeons & Dragons created simulated natures of their own and populated them with creatures that followed their artificial laws and conditions."

== Advanced Dungeons & Dragons ==
=== Original Monster Manual ===
The first publication bearing the title Monster Manual was written by Gary Gygax and published in 1977 as a 108-page book. It was the first hardcover book for any D&D game and the first of the core manuals published for the new Advanced Dungeons & Dragons (AD&D) version of the game. The Monster Manual was a game supplement intended to detail the standard monsters used with AD&D. The book compiles over 350 monsters, some new and others revised from older sources such as Monsters and Treasure, Greyhawk, Blackmoor, Eldritch Wizardry, The Strategic Review and Dragon magazine. Each monster was listed in the book alphabetically with a full description and game statistics and many featured an illustration.

The cover of the original printing was illustrated by David C. Sutherland III. A softcover version of the Monster Manual was printed in the United Kingdom by Games Workshop in 1978. When the book was reprinted in 1985 it featured new cover art by Jeff Easley. The book remained relatively unchanged throughout its fifteen printings up to 1989. Minor changes during the print run included a cover art change to match a new logo and house style, and some minor corrections introduced in the 1978 printings.

The first edition Monster Manual included topless portrayals of some of its female monsters, such as the succubus, Type V demons, lamia, and sylph. The first edition was also the first appearance of the mimic.

In 1999, a paperback reprint of the first edition was released. The first edition Monster Manual was reproduced as a reprint in 2012.

=== Reception ===
Monster Manual was also reviewed by Don Turnbull who felt that "this manual deserves a place on every D&D enthusiast's bookshelf", and praised the explanatory text, stating that it "amplifies, where necessary, [the game statistics] and the result is the most comprehensive listing of D&D monsters you will find, presented in a clarity which is unfortunately all too rare in other sources." Turnbull noted some minor printing errors and felt that some of the drawings were not as good as others, but felt that the book's quality "is as high as one can reasonably expect in such a complex matter". Turnbull concluded by saying "I can do no more than heap high praise on the Monster Manual. If every DM and every player didn't buy it, I would be very surprised. It is without doubt the best thing that TSR have produced so far." Lawrence Schick, author of Heroic Worlds, commented that "As nothing is easier to design than new monsters, it has spawned a host of imitations." Games journalist David M. Ewalt commented that the "Advanced Dungeons & Dragons Monster Manual may have been a rush job, but its quality is undeniable.[...] The Monster Manual succeeded not just as a game supplement but by elevating the D&D rule book to fetish object. [...] The book became a beloved companion to a generation of gamers, something they came back to again and again."

Scott Taylor of Black Gate listed the Monster Manual as #8 on the list of "Top 10 'Orange Spine' AD&D Hardcovers By Jeff Easley, saying "Classic! Red Dragon fighting Pegasi in an air duel? What isn't to love about this one?"

In his 2023 book Monsters, Aliens, and Holes in the Ground, RPG historian Stu Horvath called the amount and professionalism of the interior illustrations groundbreaking, saying "Sutherland is joined primarily by David Trampier, whose clean, precise lines often evoke the feel of medieval woodcuts. Together, they create a world where green slime drips from the ceiling and treasure chests can come to (hungry) life. RPGs take place in the theater of the mind, but the importance of finally seeing these creatures, often in tableau with unfortunate adventurers meeting their dooms, can't be overstated ... Monster Manual set the mold for other to follow [and] all embrace a standard of art and detail created here by Gygax and his collaborators." Witwer et al. commented in their overview of the artwork of the game: "Collectively, the Monster Manual images became the canonical representations of these fantastic creatures for an entire generation, a modern bestiary that has served as an authoritative resource for countless subsequent fantasy games."

=== Fiend Folio ===
Fiend Folio was published by TSR, Inc. Fiend Folio was primarily made up of monsters described in the "Fiend Factory" feature of White Dwarf and from various D&D modules, while some were original creations. It introduced several popular monsters to the D&D game including drow, githyanki, githzerai, slaad, and death knights. It also featured monsters that were widely ridiculed, such as the flumph, one of the few non-evil creatures presented in the volume.

=== Monster Manual II ===
Monster Manual II was a 160-page hardcover book published in 1983, also credited solely to Gygax. The book was a supplement that detailed more than 250 monsters, most of them featuring illustrations. Many monsters in the book were taken from previously published adventure modules, in particular quite a number from S4: Lost Caverns of Tsojcanth, and a dozen devils that had been first published in the pages of Dragon magazine. The book contained random encounter tables for dungeon and wilderness settings built from the monsters in the Monster Manual, Fiend Folio, and Monster Manual II. Like the Fiend Folio before it, the monsters in Monster Manual II listed the experience point value for each monster within the entry. The Monster Manual II along with the First Edition Unearthed Arcana book featured quite a number of monsters, races, and places from Gary Gygax's home Greyhawk campaign world.

== Advanced Dungeons & Dragons 2nd Edition ==
The Monstrous Compendium superseded the Monster Manual with the release of AD&D 2nd edition. The Compendium was a binder of looseleaf sheets, rather than a hardback book. The first two volumes contained the core monsters of the game. These were followed by many appendices that contained extra monsters for particular campaign settings.

The format was intended to help Dungeon Masters (DM) keep handy only the monster statistics needed for a particular game session, as well as to greatly expand the information about each monster, as each was given at least one full page. It would also mean they would only need to purchase core volumes and appendix volumes for the campaigns they wanted, rather than getting a mix of monsters in books. However, the binder format ultimately proved impractical for two main reasons. First, looseleaf pages were not as durable as the hardcover format. As it was a frequently used game aid this was a serious concern. Second, TSR routinely printed different monsters on each side of a sheet, making it impossible to keep monsters in strict alphabetical order.

In 1993, the Monstrous Manual was released, compiling all monsters from the first two volumes of the Monstrous Compendium plus many monsters from other sources into a 384-page hardcover book edited by Doug Stewart. More Monstrous Compendium appendices were released as a supplements to the Monstrous Manual in the form of paperback books. They included updated reprints of loose leaf Monstrous Compendium Appendices and new volumes.

== Dungeons & Dragons 3rd edition ==
Monster Manual (2000)
- Author: Monte Cook, Jonathan Tweet, Skip Williams
- Genre: Role-playing game
- Publisher: Wizards of the Coast
- Publication date: October 1, 2000
- Media type: Print (Hardback)
- Pages: 224
- ISBN: 0-7869-1552-8
- Followed by: Monster Manual II

The Monster Manual for the third edition of D&D was released on October 1, 2000 as the third of three core books of the system. Monte Cook, Jonathan Tweet, and Skip Williams all contributed to the third edition Monster Manual. Williams is credited with the design of the book. The updates were not intended to make major changes, only to update older monsters to third edition rules. According to Williams, "the first item on the agenda was combing through the game's twenty year collection of monsters, and deciding which ones were going into the book... The design team decided to focus on creatures that fit well into classic dungeon style adventures, with extra emphasis on creatures we felt the game needed." In 2001 Monster Manual won the Origins Award for Best Graphic Design of a Roleplaying Game, Adventure, or Supplement 2000. One reviewer for Pyramid called it "...an essential reference book, and it is a bargain..."

The next volumes, Monster Manual II and Fiend Folio were new monster-specific rulebooks. They contain mostly updated monsters from the sourcebooks of earlier editions, though some monsters have almost no overlap with those of their first edition namesakes. There were no new versions of Monster Manual II or Fiend Folio for the 3.5 edition of D&D, although update errata for both volumes and for the original third edition Monster Manual are available for download from the publisher's website.

=== Dungeons & Dragons version 3.5 ===
Monster Manual (2003)
- Author: Monte Cook, Jonathan Tweet, Skip Williams
- Genre: Role-playing game
- Publisher: Wizards of the Coast
- Publication date: July 1, 2003
- Media type: Print (Hardback)
- Pages: 319
- ISBN: 0-7869-2893-X
- Followed by: Monster Manual III, Monster Manual IV, Monster Manual V

In July 2003, the Monster Manual was revised and released again for D&D v 3.5. The revision was done by Rich Baker and Skip Williams. The 3.5 revision has a slightly different entry on each monster than 3rd edition. Notably, each monster's attack has been divided into attack and full attack entries. When asked about the hardest part in revising the book, Rich Baker replied: "The hardest part of the job was probably the sheer volume of the work we needed to do. There are hundreds of monster entries, and each monster has a couple dozen data points to examine and check." Some creatures from the Psionics Handbook and the third edition Manual of the Planes were added to the revised book. Further revision included the addition of an enhanced version of most monsters as an example of advancement (usually either with a template or with class levels). Many monsters also included instructions on how to use them as player characters.

The Monster Manual v 3.5 was reproduced as a premium reprint on September 18, 2012.

==== Monster Manual III ====
Monster Manual III was published in September 2004, and was designed by Rich Burlew, Eric Cagle, Jesse Decker, Andrew J. Finch, Gwendolyn F.M. Kestrel, Rich Redman, Matthew Sernett, Chris Thomasson, and P. Nathan Toomey. This Monster Manual is notable for its descriptions of where the monsters might be found in the Eberron and Forgotten Realms campaign settings. Chris Perkins explained: "Almost all of the monsters in the Monster Manual III are new. We didn't want to give gamers a bunch of beasties they'd already seen, and we found several interesting monster niches to fill.

==== Monster Manual IV ====
Monster Manual IV, published July 2006, was designed by Gwendolyn F.M. Kestrel, Jennifer Clarke Wilkes, Matthew Sernett, Eric Cagle, Andrew Finch, Christopher Lindsay, Kolja Raven Liquette, Chris Sims, Owen K.C. Stephens, Travis Stout, JD Wiker, and Skip Williams. This book was also published in the v3.5 format and used the new stat block format that was introduced in the Dungeon Master's Guide II. Monster Manual IV contained fewer actual monsters than Monster Manual II and Monster Manual III, but had sample lairs and encounters for them, gave stats for classes and templates applied to old creatures, and full page maps. The book also ties into the "Year of the Dragons" theme that Wizards of the Coast planned out for 2006 with the Spawn of Tiamat, yet contains no new monsters that are considered true dragons.

==== Special Edition Monster Manual ====
In October 2006, the Special Edition Monster Manual was released, completing the set of special edition core rulebooks started in 2004 to commemorate the 30th anniversary of D&D. Like the others, this book was leather-bound with silver-gilt edges and a cloth bookmark. The book was expanded with some new information, 31 new illustrations, and a new index. All collected errata up to its release date were included in this revision.

==== Monster Manual V ====
Monster Manual V was released in July 2007, with David Noonan as lead designer, and additional design by Creighton Broadhurst, Jason Bulmahn, David Chart, B. Matthew Conklin III, Jesse Decker, James "Grim" Desborough, Rob Heinsoo, Sterling Hershey, Tim Hitchcock, Luke Johnson, Nicholas Logue, Mike McArtor, Aaron Rosenberg, Robert J. Schwalb, Rodney Thompson, and Wil Upchurch. This book was published in the same format as the Monster Manual IV, featuring lairs and tactics and, like III and IV, detailing how these new monsters fit into Eberron and Forgotten Realms.

== Dungeons & Dragons 4th edition ==
Monster Manual (2008)
- Author: Mike Mearls, Stephen Schubert, James Wyatt, and Matt Sernett
- Genre: Role-playing game
- Publisher: Wizards of the Coast
- Publication date: June 6, 2008
- Media type: Print (Hardback)
- Pages: 288
- ISBN: 978-0-7869-4852-9
- Followed by: Monster Manual 2, Monster Manual 3

The D&D 4th edition Monster Manual was released with the other core books on June 6, 2008. It featured the demon prince Orcus on the cover. The book was designed by Mike Mearls, Stephen Schubert, and James Wyatt.

Monster Manual 2 was released on May 20, 2009 with Demogorgon on the cover; Monster Manual 3 was released on June 15, 2010 featuring Lolth on its cover.

Monster Vault was released November 16, 2010 and featured monsters introduced in the Monster Manual revised to the new format that was introduced in Monster Manual 3. Monster Vault: Threats to the Nentir Vale was released June 28, 2011 and re-introduced a few new monsters as well as several related to the setting of Nentir Vale. All volumes of the Monster Vault are parts of the Dungeons & Dragons Essentials line of 4th edition D&D products.

== Dungeons & Dragons 5th edition ==
Monster Manual (2014)
- Author: Mike Mearls, Jeremy Crawford, Chris Sims, Rodney Thompson, Lee Peter, Robert J. Schwalb, Matt Sernett, Steve Townshend, James Wyatt, and Wizards RPG Team
- Genre: Role-playing game
- Publisher: Wizards of the Coast
- Publication date: September 17, 2014
- Media type: Print (Hardback)
- Pages: 352
- ISBN: 978-0-7869-6561-8

On September 30, 2014, the D&D 5th edition Monster Manual was the second core book released for the new edition. On the staggered release schedule, Jeremy Crawford wrote "our small team couldn't finish the books at the same time and also ensure their high quality. [...] We could either stagger their releases, or we could sit on the books until all three were finished". The book is 350 pages and illustrated. Crawford and Mike Mearls co-lead design for the Fifth Edition of Dungeons & Dragons. The cover depicts the beholder Xanathar attacking adventurers in the Underdark.

Monster Manual (2024)
- Author: Wizards RPG Team
- Genre: Role-playing game
- Publisher: Wizards of the Coast
- Publication date: February 18, 2025
- Media type: Print (Hardback)

=== Reception ===
In Publishers Weekly's "Best-selling Books Week Ending October 13, 2014", Monster Manual was #5 in "Hardcover Nonfiction" and sold 16,956 units.

In a review of Monster Manual in Black Gate, Scott Taylor said "In all, this is a very sharp book in the gaming 'Big Three' (Players Handbook, DMG, and MM), and anyone looking to take on the challenge of 5E will be happy with what they've invested in."

The 5th edition Monster Manual won the 2015 Origins Award for Best Role Playing Supplement and Fan Favorite Role Playing Supplement. The book won two 2015 gold ENnie Awards: "Best Monster/Adversary" and "Best Interior Art".
