= David M. Ewalt =

American journalist

- Born: 1976 (age 49–50); United States
- Occupations: Journalist and author
- Employer: Scientific American
- Website: davidmewalt.com

David M. Ewalt (born 1976) is an American journalist and author. Ewalt is the author of the books Of Dice and Men: The Story of Dungeons & Dragons and The People Who Play It (2013) and Defying Reality: The Inside Story of the Virtual Reality Revolution (2018). As of June 2025, he is the editor-in-chief of Scientific American.

== Career ==
David M. Ewalt was the science & technology editor at The Messenger. Previously he was Editor in Chief of Gizmodo, an editor at The Wall Street Journal and Reuters, and wrote for a wide range of media outlets including The Wall Street Journal and New York magazine. Before that, Ewalt was deputy editor of Forbes magazine, where he wrote numerous in-depth cover stories on technology companies including Oculus VR, Magic Leap, Microsoft, Mojang, SHI International, and Bigelow Aerospace. Prior to Forbes he was a reporter at InformationWeek.

Ewalt is regarded as an expert on the intersection of technology and gaming and has been interviewed by media outlets including The New York Times and National Public Radio, and he was a frequent guest on the live television program Attack of the Show!

Ewalt has also been invited to speak to organizations including Google, Microsoft Research, and Huawei.

As the editor-in-chief of Scientific American, he sought to keep coverage less political and told editors to keep the word "Trump" out of headlines, citing pressure from Springer Nature, which owned Scientific American.

== Works ==
In 2013, Simon & Schuster published Ewalt's first book, Of Dice and Men: The Story of Dungeons & Dragons and The People Who Play It, about the pioneering role-playing game Dungeons & Dragons. It was reviewed by major publications including The Wall Street Journal, The Seattle Times, Los Angeles Times, Kirkus, and Publishers Weekly. The book was picked as one of Amazon's Best Books of the Year and listed as one of Hudson Booksellers' Best Books of 2013. In 2024, a second edition of the book was published with additional material.

In 2009, Ewalt co-created the inaugural Forbes list of The World's Most Powerful People and has edited each annual update of the ranking. The list has received significant global coverage and attention in the media, and Ewalt has appeared as a guest to discuss it on outlets including CNN, MSNBC, CNBC, and Fox Business Network.
