= Player's Option: Skills & Powers =

Tabletop role-playing game book by Douglas Niles

- Author: Douglas Niles and Dale Donovan
- Genre: Role-playing game
- Publisher: TSR
- Publication date: 1995
- Media type: Print (Hardcover)
- Pages: 192
- ISBN: 0786901497

Player's Option: Skills & Powers (abbreviated SP, or S&P) is a supplemental sourcebook to the core rules of the second edition of the Advanced Dungeons & Dragons fantasy role-playing game.

== Contents ==
Skills & Powers is a supplement which presents new rules that broadened character abilities, bringing these abilities together into groups and adding "character point" values. Players purchase abilities for their characters, as long as the character has enough points to spend and that the group for that ability is available for the class and race of that character. Skills & Powers includes new methods for rolling the six ability score statistics for characters, and rules for the player to alter these scores. Each such statistic is further divided into a pair of sub-statistics, and the ability scores of the character will depend on one of the sub-statistics for any circumstance. When the value of each ability score is determined, that value is also assigned to both sub-statistics and the player can lower one to raise the other. The book presents additional options to focus the abilities and background for any character, including a table to determine what event started a character out as an adventurer, and a collection of "character kits" that a player can use to set social rank and to change the abilities of the character. The book also includes four new schools of magic, as well as an updated psionics system.

The book begins with a one-page foreword by Niles and Donovan. Chapter One (pages 6–11) describes the character points system for Player's Option, which are used to improve the abilities of player characters. Chapter Two (pages 12–21) describes ability scores, each of which is divided into two subabilities. Chapter Three (pages 22–45) describes the racial requirements for each character race. Chapter Four (pages 46–63) presents details on how the various character classes work in the Player's Option system. Chapter Five (pages 64–85) provides 30 character kits, various character packages. Chapter Six (pages 86–111) details how nonweapon proficiencies work in play. Chapter Seven (pages 112-135) details weapon proficiency and mastery. Chapter Eight (pages 136-141) provides five new schools of magic. Chapter Nine (pages 142-175) details psionics in the Player's Option system. An appendix (pages 178-187) compiles the tables presented in this book. Pages 188-192 are an index to the book.

== Publication history ==
This 192-page book was published by TSR, Inc. in 1995. The book was designed by Douglas Niles and Dale Donovan. Cover art is by Jeff Easley and interior art is by Thomas Baxa, Doug Chaffee, Les Dorscheid, Jeff Easley, Ken Frank, and Eric Hotz.

The psionics system from this book is later used in Dark Sun Campaign Setting, Expanded and Revised.

== Reception ==
Cliff Ramshaw reviewed Player's Option: Skills & Powers for Arcane magazine, rating it a 9 out of 10 overall. He felt that readers might suspect that Skills & Powers would "do nothing but further confuse the situation" regarding the "out of hand" number of character classes available in the game, but suggested that the book "in fact does the opposite". According to Ramshaw, "When you start to use this system, you realise it's superb. Character abilities are still largely determined by the luck of the dice, and yet players are able to gain much more control over which abilities they wish to favour. And all without upsetting the tried and tested balance of the AD&D stats system." Ramshaw admits that character creation is "much more complex and time-consuming with these new rules but if, like me, you enjoy creating characters, then this will be a bonus rather than a problem" and that "the result is much greater player choice without letting characters get grossly out of hand. And once the character has been generated, it's no more difficult to play or referee than a character of the old school." Ramshaw concludes that "Although Skills & Powers will appeal particularly to players who'd like their characters to take on the abilities of specific heroes from literature, anyone who wants to make their characters stand out from the crowd will simply love it."

== Reviews ==
- Backstab #9
- Casus Belli #89
