= Dungeons & Dragons Rules Cyclopedia =

Rule book for tabletop role-playing game Dungeons & Dragons

Rules Cyclopedia
- Cover
- Authors: Aaron Allston (compilation and development), Steven E. Schend, Jon Pickens, and Dori Jean Watry (editing)
- Genre: Role-playing game
- Publisher: TSR, Inc.
- Publication date: 1991
- Media type: Print (Hardcover)
- Pages: 304

The Dungeons & Dragons Rules Cyclopedia is a 1991 book published by TSR, Inc., as a continuation of the basic edition of the Dungeons & Dragons fantasy role-playing game, which ran concurrently with Advanced Dungeons & Dragons. Its product designation was TSR 1071.

== Contents ==
The Rules Cyclopedia contained all the major rules, compiled and revised from the Dungeons & Dragons Basic Rules, as well as the Expert Rules, Companion Rules, and Master Rules boxed sets.

However, the book's introduction on page 5 states that it is "intended to be a reference volume for those who already play the D&D game ... this book is aimed at the experienced user ... [it] lacks many of the examples and patient explanation you'll find in the D&D box sets". The same year, a revised introductory Dungeons & Dragons set was released to introduce new players to the game.

This was the second revision to the D&D rules. These guidelines allow a player to develop and play characters from levels 1 through 36, and includes a special section on skills. The book also contained an overview of the Known World (Mystara) and Hollow World campaign settings. It also has rules on how to convert characters between the Dungeons & Dragons game and the Advanced Dungeons & Dragons 2nd Edition (AD&D) game.

The Rules Cyclopedia includes two optional player-character classes not found in the Basic Set: the druid (introduced in the Companion ruleset and also present in AD&D from its first edition), and the mystic (introduced in the Master ruleset and similar to the monk class found in AD&D).

== Publication history ==
The D&D Rules Cyclopedia was designed by Aaron Allston and published by TSR, Inc. This 304-page hardback book features cover artwork by Jeff Easley and interior art by Terry Dykstra.

== Reception ==
Rick Swan reviewed the D&D Rules Cyclopedia for Dragon magazine #184 (August 1992). He calls the book a "stunningly comprehensive volume", explaining that it "includes more detail than most GMs will ever use [...] but if you want it, you can probably find it here". According to Swan, "Best of all, the material is a joy to read, thanks to the breezy style of Aaron Allston, who must've been genetically engineered to write RPG rules. This is a must for serious fans."

Shannon Appelcline said that the book "was a nice compilation that was appreciated by the fans".
