= List of Dungeons & Dragons 3rd edition monsters =

Dungeons & Dragons 3rd Edition (see editions of Dungeons & Dragons) was released in 2000. The first book containing monsters, one of the essential elements of the game, to be published was the Monster Manual, released along with the other two "core" rulebooks. Wizards of the Coast officially discontinued the 3rd Edition line upon the release of a revision, known as version 3.5, in 2003, with the Monster Manual reprinted for the revised edition. In this edition, killing monsters as to gain experience points was complemented by other achievements like negotiating, sneaking by or investigation. Additionally, the concept of challenge rating of monsters was introduced, a number to gauge their danger compared to the player characters' level. Further new elements were the grouping of creatures into defined types, and templates, which were not monsters in themselves but a set of changes that could be applied to a creature or character, like celestial versions of animals or vampires. Reviewer stylo considered this an "interesting new approach". The depictions of monsters were considered much improved as compared to earlier editions, with the exception of the Planescape setting. Animal studies scholar Matthew Chrulew observed that "the ideological work" of implementing creatures in the game "is performed by text and image in tandem" which "both conform to a logic of consumption and control. The images are certainly supplementary to classification, but hardly disturbing of it."

== TSR 11552 – Monster Manual (2000) ==
Creature	Other appearances	Variants	Description
Aboleth			Psionic fish-like amphibian found in underwater lakes and rivers capable of enslaving other creatures. SyFy Wire contributor Lisa Granshaw included them in her 2018 list of "The 9 Scariest, Most Unforgettable Monsters From Dungeons & Dragons" due to their impressive abilities and vengefulness.
Achaierai	Fiend Folio (1981)		Large, flightless bird. Evil and intelligent, it originates from the plane of Acheron. CJ Miozzi included the achaierai on The Escapist's list of "The Dumbest Dungeons & Dragons Monsters Ever (And How To Use Them)".
Allip			Undead spirit of someone driven to madness and suicide. Looks as it did in life, but with features distorted by madness.
Animated object			Mundane object animated by magic.
Ankheg			Large, burrowing creature with mandibles and a chitinous shell capable of spitting acid.
Aranea			Intelligent giant spider capable of changing forms and of utilizing sorcerous magic.
Arrowhawk			Bird-like creature from the Elemental Plane of Air.
Assassin vine			Plant that strangles passers-by.
Athach			Very large and strong biped with a third arm on its chest.
Azer	Monster Manual II (1983)		Flaming dwarf from the Elemental Plane of Fire.
Barghest	Monster Manual II (1983)		Lawful evil outsider that changes from the form of a large goblin to that of a wolf.
Basilisk			Reptilian monster that petrifies opponents with a gaze. Based on the creature from medieval bestiaries. In the original Monster Manual it is described as a reptilian monster whose gaze can turn creatures to stone. AD&D's basilisk was also adapted into the Magic: The Gathering trading card game, with a depiction taken from the Monster Manual being used in a prototype version.
Behir			40-foot-long (12 m), snake-like monster with very hard scales capable of shooting lightning from its mouth.
Beholder	Monster Manual I (1977)		Floating orb with a single eye in its center, a large mouth and ten smaller eyes on stalks capable of several magical effects. A large orb dominated by a central eye and a large toothy maw, with 10 smaller eyes on stalks sprouting from the top of the orb; the large eye negates all magic and the smaller eyes cause a variety of magical effects. A "creature that looks at you and is destroying you by the power of its magical eyes". A terrible beast, but depicted as "a cuddly rosy ball with too many eyes". Designed to counter magic-using characters while being a formidable opponent for a whole party due to its versatility. Considered one of "the game's signature monsters" by Philip J. Clements. A "classic", "iconic", as well as "one of the most feared and fearsome monsters of the game", present through all editions.
Belker	Planescape Monstrous Compendium III (1998)		Evil air elemental that resemble a demon in the form of smoke.
Blink dog			Intelligent, lawful good canine with the ability to teleport.
Bodak			Undead creature created when someone is destroyed by the touch of absolute evil.
Bugbear			Large, aggressive, hairy cousin of the goblin, for the most part presented as inherently evil before the 5th edition of the game,
Bulette			20-foot-long (6.1 m) quadrupedal predator known as a "landshark" covered in bluish plates and scales. Also called land shark, inspired by a plastic toy from Hong Kong. In his 2019 book The Monsters Know What They're Doing, author Keith Ammann called bulettes "brutes tailor-made to give your players jump scares" and found its preferences and aversions for the meat of different humanoid races "ludicrous".
Carrion crawler			Subterranean scavenger able to paralyze opponents with its tentacles.
Celestial			Any one of a number of creatures from a plane of good. Lantern archon, hound archon, avoral (guardinal), ghaele (eladrin), trumpet archon, astral deva, planetar and solar listed. Celestials from the Outer Planes, "charming creatures protecting the universe against evil". The solar is a very powerful winged angelic humanoids, and Backstab reviewer Michaël Croitoriu thought them truly interesting for powergamers when made available as player characters.
Centaur			Reclusive creature from woodland with the body and legs of a horse attached to the torso and upper body of a humanoid. Based on the creature from Greek mythology.
Chaos beast			Monster from a chaotic plane with an ever-changing form and the ability to turn other creatures to formless goo.
Chimera			Monster with the hindquarters of a goat, forequarters of a lion, wings of a dragon and heads of all three. The chimera is based on the chimera of Greek mythology as found in the Iliad by Homer, "stronger than a centaur but weaker than a sphinx". Present in the game since the earliest edition.
Choker			Subterranean predatory aberration of a humanoid shape with long limbs that grabs and strangles prey.
Chuul			Amphibious aberration that appears to be a cross between a crustacean, an insect and a snake.
Cloaker			Intelligent creature of chaotic neutral alignment resembling a black cloak. An original creation for the game's artificial underground environment, this monster was designed as a trap for unwary player characters; it looks like a living cloak with teeth.
Cockatrice			Cross between a lizard, cockerel and bat able to turn flesh to stone. Based on the creature from medieval bestiaries.
Couatl			Lawful good, highly intelligent creature resembling a winged snake. Worshipped in regions it inhabits. Based on the creature from Mesoamerican religion.
Darkmantle			Cave dwelling creature that resembles a stalagmite when at rest. Able to create magical darkness, it defeats enemies by engulfing and constricting them.
Delver			Aberration that lives deep underground and feeds on rock.
Demon			Any one of many types of chaotic evil outsiders from the plane of the Abyss. Includes the sub-type of tanar'ri demons. Tanar'ri were renamed from demons in response to moral panic, many were based on figures from Christian demonology. Considered among the "standard repertoire of "Monsters"" by Fabian Perlini-Pfister. In a review of Planescape Monstrous Compendium Appendix II for Arcane magazine, the reviewer cites the culture of the tanar'ri as helping "give the Planes a solid base of peoples".
Destrachan			
Devil			Don Turnbull considered the devils the most prominent among the new monsters introduced in the Monster Manual: "they are all pretty strong and compare not unfavourably in this respect with the Demons we already know". Renamed from devils in response to moral panic. Many were based on figures from Christian demonology.
Devourer			Very large undead creature found on the Astral and Ethereal planes. Appears to be a large skeleton with strands of flesh and a tiny figure trapped in the ribcage. A giant skeleton that is holding a small figure prisoner in their ribcage, this creature is highlighted by reviewer Kaneda for characters to steer away from.
Digester			Fast moving creature resembling a predatory dinosaur that can spit acid.
Dinosaur			Any of several real-world dinosaurs. Listed are deinonychus, elasmosaurus, megaraptor, triceratops and tyrannosaurus. Considered among the "standard repertoire of "Monsters"", and among the 12 most underrated monsters, "a creature as large and fearsome as a dragon but without all the hype".
Dire animal			Larger and more aggressive versions of an ordinary animal. Animal studies scholar Matthew Chrulew assumed that dire versions of mundane animals were designed for the game because "[o]nly in this way might they provide a significant challenge or aid." Listed animals are rat, weasel, badger, bat, ape, wolverine, wolf, boar, lion, bear, tiger and shark.
Displacer beast			Savage yet stealthy predator resembling a puma with six legs and tentacles growing from its shoulders. A magical creature resembling a puma with a tentacle growing from each shoulder, it hates all forms of life, and always appears 3 feet from its actual position. Based on the alien Coeurl from the short story Black Destroyer by A. E. van Vogt. David M. Ewalt, in his book Of Dice and Men, discussed several monsters appearing in the original Monster Manual, describing displacer beasts as looking like "pumas with thorn-covered tentacles growing out of their shoulders". Rob Bricken from io9 named the displacer beast as the 2nd most memorable D&D monster.
Doppelganger			A humanoid shape-changer race infiltrating society for its own convenience
Dragon			Any of five chromatic (evil) or five metallic (good) intelligent winged lizards that grow to be very large and powerful. Powerful and intelligent, usually winged reptiles with magical abilities and breath weapon. The different subraces, distinguished by their colouring, vary in power. The dragon has been referred to as the "iconic creature for D&D adventurers to conquer". The third edition presentation aimed to give the dragons a believable anatomy while still linking to the original artwork of Dave Sutherland, and give the different races distinct wings and facial features. This incarnation was then considered the ""definitive" representation of these monsters" for the game.
Dragon turtle			A type of steam-breathing dragon with the shell of a giant turtle. Lives primarily in the open seas. Present in the game since its inception.
Dragonne			A relatively small, leonine-like dragon type. Its breath weapon (contrary to traditional dragons) is its loud roar. Present "in every edition of the game", James Wyatt stated it was "probably the oldest manifestation in the game of the idea of a half-dragon". Renamed to liondrake in 5th edition.
Drider			A drow mage or cleric outcast transformed into a hideous centauroid spider-creature by the power of the goddess Lolth.
Dryad			A human-like female tree spirit. Based on the dryad from classical sources. The dryad appears as a player character class in Tall Tales of the Wee Folk in the "DM's booklet" (1989).
Dwarf			Based on Tolkien's version of the dwarf. Often depicted as "short, stout, and fond of ale", "bearded masters of metalworking" and "predisposed towards a "good" moral alignment", "tend to embody an extreme vision of masculinity".
Elemental			Powerful creatures in the game; a characteristic of the air elemental is the ability of rapid movement.
Elf			Based on Tolkien's version of the elf, "quick but fragile", with senses surpassing a human's, often depicted as "effeminate" and "predisposed towards a "good" moral alignment". Half-elves are "loosely based off of Elrond Half-elven".
Ethereal filcher			
Ethereal marauder			
Ettercap			A goblinoid creature with poisonous fangs and a certain affinity with spiders, particularly giant ones.
Ettin			A double-headed giant-like creature distantly related to orcs.
Formian			
Frost worm			
Fungus			Described are the shrieker and violet fungus. Author Ben Woodard called D&D's fungi horrific in their variety, not only due to their poisonous nature but their creepy ability to move. Scott Baird from Screen Rant ranked the man-sized shrieker among the weakest monsters in the game, at "the bottom of the mushroom monster food chain": They "can be used as cheap alarm systems for Underdark societies, but they possess no combat abilities of their own. The only thing a shrieker can do is shriek".
Gargoyle			AD&D's gargoyle was adapted into the Magic: The Gathering trading card game, with a depiction taken from the Monster Manual being used in a prototype version.
Genie			Based on notions from Middle Eastern culture, genies in the game are powerful elemental spirits from the Inner Planes, each of the four classical elements having its own subspecies of genie: djinn for air, dao for earth, efreet for fire. The djinn and efreet have namesakes from Arabic folklore also associated with air and fire, respectively. The dao were newly invented for the game altogether to fill the gap for the remaining element. A depiction of an "evil [...] efreet" already appeared in the original Dungeons & Dragons (1974) edition, another "enormous, devilish red" one was the main feature of the cover of the 1st edition Dungeon Master's Guide. Within the game's cosmology they were based on the Plane of Fire, centered around the "fabled City of Brass".
Ghoul			Undead with "terrible claws". AD&D's ghouls were also adapted into the Magic: The Gathering trading card game, with a depiction taken from the Monster Manual being used in a prototype version.
Giant			Overlarge powerful humanoids with a self-involved social focus, usually presented as the "bad guys". Based on mythological figures and Tolkien, their stone-throwing ability indicates their creative roots in wargaming.
Giant eagle			
Giant owl			
Gibbering mouther			A creature with many eyes and mouths. Witwer et al. found Erol Otus' early depiction "perversely beautiful", the artist's surrealist style very suited for this bizarre monster.
Girallon	3.5 edition revised Monster Manual (2003), fourth edition Monster Manual (2010)		An eight-foot tall gorilla with four arms and white fur
Gnoll			Richard W. Forest assumed them to be inspired from but not resembling the gnoles conceived by Lord Dunsany, while Gary Gygax himself stated that although Dunsany's "gnole" is close", he came up with the name as "a cross between a gnome and a troll", and the description was his original creation. He wanted to create a humanoid opponent in the game to fit in between the hobgoblin and bugbear in power. Gnolls were considered one of the "five main "humanoid" races" in AD&D by Paul Karczag and Lawrence Schick.
Gnome			Player character race "often stereotyped as buffoons, illusionists, mad inventors, and many characters play them as intentionally "wacky" or anachronistic"; often conforms to the trickster archetype. "predisposed towards a "good" moral alignment".
Goblin			Based primarily on the goblins portrayed in J.R.R. Tolkien's Middle-Earth. Considered one of the "five main "humanoid" races" in AD&D by Paul Karczag and Lawrence Schick. Presented as "evil" and "predisposed towards a society of brutal regimes where the strongest rule" in the game. Suitable opponent for characters of lowest level.
Golem			Divided into several types: flesh, clay, stone, and iron golem. The clay golem is based on the golem of Medieval Jewish folklore, though changed from "a cherished defender to an unthinking hulk" while the flesh golem is related to Frankenstein's monster as Universal's 1931 film, seen in e.g. being empowered by electricity. The flesh golem was ranked ninth among the ten best mid-level monsters by the authors of Dungeons & Dragons For Dummies. All golems are inspired by Gothic fiction more generally; a typical denizen of the Ravenloft setting, and "classic" monster of the game. The influence of Dungeons & Dragons has led to the inclusion of golems in other tabletop role-playing as well as in video games.
Gorgon			"iron plated bull", based on early modern bestiaries, with only the name being derived from the Classical counterpart.
Gray render	The gray render appeared in the third edition Monster Manual (2000), and in the 3.5 revised Monster Manual (2003). The gray render appeared in the fourth edition Monster Manual 2 (2009).		A gray render is a big, bulky, bulbous creature which stands 9 feet tall, despite a hunched posture, and 4 feet wide and long. It has a short tail, and a bullet-shaped head with six small, yellow eyes.
Grick			
Griffon			Originally based on the creature from Persian mythology.
Grimlock			A blind, savage humanoid cave-dwelling race
Hag			Divided into several types: sea hag, annis, and green hag. Immortal wicked and ugly powerful females with magical abilities for deception. Based on the pervasive figure from folklore, with "different interpretations of the monster around the world" being worked into different variants in the game, allowing each "a little more personality". In the view of Stag and Trammel, hags in D&D represent misogynistic and ageist tendencies in their authors. SyFy Wire in 2018 called it one of "The 9 Scariest, Most Unforgettable Monsters From Dungeons & Dragons", saying that "There are endless horrific possibilities when it comes to hags."
Halfling			Based on and renamed from the hobbit in J.R.R. Tolkien's works. The hobbit first appeared as a player character class in the original 1974 edition of Dungeons & Dragons. Later the game began using the name "halfling" as an alternative to "hobbit" for legal reasons. The "halfling" appeared as a player character race in the original Player's Handbook (1978).
Harpy			Based on the creature from Greek mythology. Witwer et al. viewed its artistic rendering in 5th edition as "redesigned from prior editions to entice more Dungeon Master use."
Hell hound			
Hippogriff			Originally based on the creature from Persian mythology the adapted hippogriff "was among the earliest fantasy beasts introduced into the Dungeons & Dragons universe": An artistic representation drawing inspiration from real eagles and horses was used for the cover of the third booklet of the original Dungeons & Dragons (1974) edition and became one of "the game's earliest ambassadors" through use of that cover in advertisements. Gary Gygax used a story in which he received a letter asking how many eggs a Hippogriff could lay as an example of the encyclopedic knowledge which fans expected him to have over every detail of gameplay.
Hobgoblin			Muscular humanoids somewhat taller than humans with reddish skin and canine teeth. Mordenkainen Presents: Monsters of the Multiverse gave them a new background as a species originating in and expelled from the Feywild, while also presenting hobgoblins societies with different characteristics on different worlds, but all centered around forming close-knit groups.
Homunculus			
Howler			
Hydra			May possess anything between five and twelve heads. Based on the creature from classical sources, with Heracles' famed method of slaying it adapted into a vulnerability against fire, but not with the less well-known poisonous bite, showing how the game mostly focusses on the well-known traits of mythological creatures. Present in the game since its inception. AD&D's hydra was also adapted into the Magic: The Gathering trading card game, with a depiction taken from the Monster Manual being used in a prototype version.
Invisible stalker			
Kobold			"[S]hort subterranean lizard-men", considered one of the "five main "humanoid" races" in AD&D by Paul Karczag and Lawrence Schick, and ranked among the weakest monsters in the game by Scott Baird from Screen Rant.
Kraken			
Krenshar			
Kuo-toa			"evil fish-men"
Lamia			
Lammasu			
Lillend			
Lizardfolk			Lizardfolk are primitive reptilian humanoids typically standing from six to seven feet tall. A player character race in some settings. Reviewer Chris Gigoux described them by saying "Lizard Men aren't bad, [...] they're just a simple folks, struggling to survive." In 2020, Comic Book Resources counted the lizardfolk as # 1 on the list of "10 Powerful Monster Species That You Should Play As", stating that "Along with the ability to manufacture their own weapons from the natural environment around them, they provide an excellent role-playing experience and have some pretty awesome tricks up their sleeve." An image of a lizard man by Greg Bell functioned as the logo in the early phase of TSR Hobbies, while "the bloodied bodies of lizard men" overcome by a group of adventurers featured on the cover of the 1st edition Player's Handbook, considered "arguably the most iconic piece of art in all of RPGdom" by Reactor magazine commentator Saladin Ahmed.
Locathah			
Magmin			
Manticore			Based on its mythological counterpart, including the barbed tail, the manticore appeared in the game from its earliest edition.
Medusa			Based on the creature from classical sources but translated into species of monsters originated from "humans seeking eternal youth". Reviewer Allan Rausch found their portrayal as "a woman with snakes for hair" up to 2nd edition less compelling than their less human-like depiction in 3rd edition. Part of the game from its very beginning, a medusa was already depicted in the playtest material from 1973 for the original edition.
Mephit			Described are the air mephit, dust mephit, earth mephit, fire mephit, ice mephit, magma mephit, ooze mephit, salt mephit, steam mephit, and water mephit. First published in White Dwarf #13 (June/July 1979) under the names of fire imp, molten imp, smoke imp and steam imp, respectively (not including ice and mist mephits), originally submitted by M. Stollery. These "imps" were voted among the top ten monsters from the magazine's "Fiend Factory" column in 1980.
Merfolk			
Mimic			An original creation for the game's artificial underground environment, this "iconic monster" looks like a treasure chest and is designed as a trap for unwary player characters.
Mind flayer			"Squid-headed humanoids", considered one of "the game's signature monsters" by Philip J. Clements. Reviewer Julien Blondel described them as vile brain-eating creatures full of psionic energy. He found them delightful creatures for a sadistic Dungeon Master to use, and a useful bridge between classic game worlds and the planes, as illithids abound in both.
Minotaur			Based on the creature from Greek mythology, but translated from a singular creature into a species. In 2021, Comic Book Resources counted the minotaur as one of the "7 Underused Monster Races in Dungeons & Dragons", stating that "far from just brutal monsters. Many are lawful by nature, which means, surprisingly, Minotaurs make for some good Paladins. They also, obviously, make for some good Barbarians, Monks and Fighters. There's a lot of potential with Minotaurs. People hate and fear them, but you might be able to play that to your advantage...or fight against the stereotypes." The minotaur was among the monsters featured as trading cards on the back of Amurol Products candy figure boxes. AD&D's minotaurs were also adapted into the Magic: The Gathering trading card game, with a depiction taken from the Monster Manual being used in a prototype version.
Mohrg			
Mummy			Powerful undead usually from desert areas, wrapped in bandages. Based on the creature from Gothic fiction and appearances in more contemporary entertainment, a typical denizen of the Ravenloft setting. In his review of the Monster Manual in the British magazine White Dwarf #8 (August/September 1978), Don Turnbull noted that the mummy was revised from its previous statistics, and could now cause paralysis on sight (as a result of fear).
Naga			Described are the water naga, spirit naga, dark naga, and guardian naga. Snake-like magical creatures with humanoid head. Based on the nāga from Indian mythology.
Night hag			Powerful hag from Hades, propagating evil by creating larvae. Don Turnbull referred to the night hag as "splendid" and notes that the illustration of the night hag is the best drawing in the book. It has been described as comparable to the Alp of folklore, although "considered a more Judeo-Christian demonic influence".
Nightmare			
Nightshade			Described are the nightwing, nightwalker, and nightcrawler
Nymph			Based on the nymph from Greek mythology, also an instance of the sexist tropes the game draws on which presented female sexuality as inherently dangerous. Appeared in the movie Futurama: Bender's Game.
Ogre			Described are the ogre and ogre mage. Large, powerful humanoid creatures, with slightly below average intelligence. Typical bad guys in the game, who can be used to teach "players about fighting big, powerful, stupid monsters, which is an iconic D&D experience".
Ooze			Described are the gray ooze, gelatinous cube, ochre jelly, and black pudding. "D&D's large variety of monstrous oozes and slimes took their original inspiration from Irvin S. Yeathworth Jr's The Blob" movie. In the artificial dungeon environment of the game, they function as a "clean up crew". The gelatinous cube, "a living mound of gelatinous jelly", was considered especially suited for that role, as it fit exactly in the standard grid for tactical combat. Considered an "iconic monster". Ian Livingstone considered the ochre jelly one of the game's more "exotic and strange creatures". SyFy Wire contributor Lisa Granshaw counted oozes among "The 9 Scariest, Most Unforgettable Monsters From Dungeons & Dragons" and found them "extremely disturbing because everything may seem fine one minute and then the next you're on the way to death." D&D's slimes have served as inspiration for appearances of this kind of monster in many video games.
Orc			Directly adapted from the orc in J.R.R. Tolkien's works. Considered one of the "five main "humanoid" races" in AD&D by Paul Karczag and Lawrence Schick. Presented as "evil" and "savage raiders" in the game.
Otyugh			Also known as gulguthra. Game designer Don Turnbull rated the otyugh as a "most interesting creation".
Owlbear			Newly created for the game early on inspired by a Hong Kong–made plastic toy, the owlbear was well-received as a useful and memorable monster.
Pegasus			Taken from greek mythology, an example of the diverse cultures amalgamated into D&D. Part of the game from its very beginning, a pegasus was already depicted in the playtest material from 1973 for the original edition.
Phantom fungus			
Phase spider			Arachnid as big as a medium-large dog that can shift between dimensions and bite with fangs of deadly poison.
Phasm			
Planetouched			Described are the aasimar and tiefling. Descendants of a union between a human and a demon or devil; popular as player characters, as they allow for "identity tourism" of a racial outsider. Johnny L. Wilson called tieflings "the paranoid, loner obverse" of halflings, who "believe that life is out to get them". In the game they are "suited to be great thieves" and "point persons" due to favourable saving throw bonuses. Aasimar are Humanoids "descended from ethereal beings" from the Outer Planes, "charming creatures protecting the universe against evil". A.V. Club reviewer Nick Wanserski found them an interesting player character race "for the chance to be unequivocally good in a way that's difficult to embody in real life".
Pseudodragon			"a miniature dragon that also has a tail stinger" Reviewer Philippe Tessier found it "very nice" and interesting when made available as a familiar.
Purple worm			The "dread purple worm" attacks with both ends, maw and stinger. This "iconic monster" and original creation of Dungeons & Dragons is present all editions of the game.
Rakshasa			Based on the creature from Hindu mythology. Humanoid fiends with tigerlike-features, Reactor magazine commentator Saladin Ahmed rated them as "ultimate badass monsters". He found a depiction sitting with pipe and smoking-jacket fitting on second thought, as the creature is so powerful it has no need to prove its dangerousness.
Rast			
Ravid			
Remorhaz			
Roc			An enormous bird, based on a mythological creature probably of Persian origin, known from Sindbad the Sailor.
Roper			A dangerous inhabitant of the Underdark with "murderous behavior". One of the original creations for the game, Witwer et al. rated them among the "iconic D&D monsters".
Rust monster			An original invention for the game and its artificial underground world, the appearance of the rust monster was inspired by a plastic toy from Hong Kong. It was ranked among the most memorable as well as obnoxious creatures in the game, terrifying to certain characters and their players not due to their ability to fight but to destroy their items. Chris Sims of the on-line magazine Comics Alliance referred to the rust monster as "the most feared D&D monster".
Sahuagin			
Salamander			Described are the flamebrother, average salamander, and noble salamander
Satyr			Based on the satyr from classical sources.
Sea lion			
Shadow			In his review of the Monster Manual in the British magazine White Dwarf #8 (August/September 1978), Don Turnbull noted his disappointment that the shadow is of the undead class and thus subject to a cleric's turn undead ability. Turnbull commented, "I used to enjoy seeing clerics vainly trying to turn what wouldn't turn, when Shadows were first met". Rob Bricken of io9 identified the shadow as one of "The 12 Most Obnoxious Dungeons & Dragons Monsters".
Shadow mastiff			
Shambling mound			Ben Woodard considered its ability to move "the base creepiness of the creep".
Shield guardian			
Shocker lizard			
Skeleton			Described are the tiny, small, medium-size, large, huge, gargantuan, and colossal skeleton. Skeleton of a deceased creature animated as an undead. The skeleton was ranked second among the ten best low-level monsters by the authors of Dungeons & Dragons For Dummies: "introduces players to the special advantages and weaknesses of undead monsters". They also thank Ray Harryhausen for people knowing what fighting skeletons ought to look like. Screen Rant ranked the tiny skeleton one of the weakest D&D creatures, saying "[skeletons] go all the way down to Tiny-sized creatures, which means that it is possible for your party of adventurers to fight a group of skeletons that are the same size as action figures."
Skum			
Slaad			Described are the red slaad, blue slaad, green slaad, gray slaad, and death slaad. Ed Greenwood considered the slaadi "worthy additions to any campaign". GameSpy author Allan Rausch described the slaadi as "remorseless reptilian killing machines", but "For many years, slaad were a joke -- because of their artwork", which showed them as "six-foot tall carnivorous frogs". With the Planescape setting they "were reinterpreted artistically to be less frog-like and much more fearsome". Shannon Applecline considered the githzerai one of the game's especially notable monsters.
Spectre			Inspired by Gothic fiction, a typical denizen of the Ravenloft setting.
Sphinx			Described are the androsphinx, criosphinx, gynosphinx, and hieracosphinx. Based on Egyptian and Classical mythology, an example of the diverse cultures amalgamated into D&D.
Spider eater			
Sprite			Described are the grig, nixie, and pixie
Stirge			Flying and blood-sucking creatures. "[P]esky" because while small they are dangerous to characters as a swarm. Present in the game since its earliest edition.
Tarrasque			Ranked among the strongest monsters in the game by Scott Baird from Screen Rant, "the ultimate challenge for many players". Rob Bricken from io9 named the tarrasque as the 10th most memorable D&D monster. The tarrasque appeared on the 2018 Screen Rant top list at No. 5 on " Dungeons & Dragons: The 20 Most Powerful Creatures, Ranked", and Scott Baird highlighted that "The tarrasque is currently the most powerful creature in the 5th edition of Dungeons & Dragons, where it is matched only by Tiamat in terms of its combat prowess."
Tendriculos			
Thoqqua			
Titan			Based on the powerful beings from Greek mythology. Ranked among the strongest creatures in the game by Scott Baird from Screen Rant, as they "stand above giants and possess even more power in terms of their physical and magical capabilities". Backstab reviewer Michaël Croitoriu thought them truly interesting for powergamers when made available as player characters.
Tojanida			Described are the juvenile, adult, and elder tojanida
Treant			Based on the Ent by J. R. R. Tolkien, and renamed due to copyright reasons.
Triton			An aquatic race based on the merman in Greek mythology.
Troglodyte			Based on the stock character of the primitive caveman, Gary Gygax portrayed the troglodyte in the game as more monstrous, with chaotic and evil behaviour, offensive smell and lizard-like characteristics. The troglodyte was among the monsters featured as trading cards on the back of Amurol Products candy figure boxes.
Troll			Tall green-skinned evil gaunt humanoids. A characteristic denizen of AD&D worlds. Their appearance and powerful regenerative ability is taken from Three Hearts and Three Lions by Poul Anderson rather than from their mythological or Tolkienesque counterparts. Considered one of the "five main "humanoid" races" in AD&D by Paul Karczag and Lawrence Schick.
Umber hulk			Present in the game since the earliest edition.
Unicorn			Based on the creature from medieval bestiaries. The Dungeons & Dragons animated series featured Uni the unicorn as a well-received "mascot" and "cute animal sidekick".
Vampire spawn			
Vargouille			
Wight			Thin humanoid undead. Directly adapted from the barrow-wight in Tolkien's The Lord of the Rings, while the concept is inspired Icelandic sagas. Rob Bricken of io9 identified the wight as one of "The 12 Most Obnoxious Dungeons & Dragons Monsters".
Will-o'-wisp			
Winter wolf			
Worg			Worgs are giant wolves inspired by the wargs in the works of J.R.R. Tolkien; the name was changed for legal reasons, while both the word and concept ultimately go back to Old Norse idea of varg, which can refer to wolves in their violent aspect.
Wraith			Inspired by and renamed from the Nazgul from J.R.R. Tolkien's legendarium, as well as by Gothic fiction, a typical denizen of the Ravenloft setting.
Wyvern			Its tail is equipped with a poisonous tail stinger.
Xill			
Xorn			Described are the minor xorn, average xorn, and elder xorn
Yeth hound			
Yrthak			
Yuan-ti			Described are the pureblood, halfblood, and abomination yuan-ti. A species of "cult-like snake people" and among "D&D's most popular and iconic monsters". The original yuan-ti castes were the abominations, the halfbreeds, and the purebloods, which first appeared in the module Dwellers of the Forbidden City (1981), In the adventure, the characters are hired to find an object taken to a lost oriental-style city, which has been taken over by a cult of snake-worshipers, the yuan-ti, and their servants, the mongrelmen and tasloi. The types have been summarized by A.V. Club as "a human-eating snake, or human-snake hybrid eater of humans and snakes, or other human-snake hybrids." Snakes and snake-worship used in fiction have been criticized as characteristic of Orientalism. The publication history, digital and print, of yuan-ti falls into this pattern as they serve as uncomplicated antagonists in "exotic" settings. Graeme Barber, a game designer noted for his critique of racism in Dungeons & Dragons, used yuan-ti in his contribution to the book Candlekeep Mysteries. Controversy arose after Wizards of the Coast, according to Barber, altered his depiction of yuan-ti. Summarizing his critique of the simplistic portrayal, Barber wrote, "Yuan-ti are evil because evil." Keith Ammann, in his 2019 book The Monsters Know What They're Doing, commented of the yuan-ti purebloods that "Yuan-ti have had hundreds of generations to live and adapt on their own, so they'll have the same self-preservation instinct as any evolved species." TheGamer.com in April 2021 listed the yuan-ti pureblood as #2 on their list of "10 Most Underrated Races That Are Better Than You Think". CBR.com listed the yuan-ti pure blood as #5 on their list of "Top 10 Playable Species In D&D".
Zombie			Described are the tiny, small, medium-size, large, huge, gargantuan, and colossal zombie. Based on the zombie from folklore as well as more contemporary entertainment.
Animals			"Real, ordinary animals" are adapted into the game in a separate chapter, as according to Chrulew, "they comprise their own, somewhat less interesting subset" of creatures. Their presentation is relevant especially for certain classes with "a distinctly zoophilic emphasis on the development of human/animal relationships with steeds, companion animals, and familiars", as well as with regard to the "druid's theriomorphic ability of 'wild shape,' by which they can transform into ever-stronger animals".
Ape			
Baboon			
Badger			
Bat			
Bear, black			
Bear, brown			
Bear, polar			
Bison			
Boar			
Camel			
Cat			
Cheetah			
Crocodile			Described are the crocodile and giant crocodile
Dog			
Dog, riding			
Donkey			
Eagle			
Elephant			
Hawk			
Horse			Described are the heavy horse, heavy warhorse, light horse, and light warhorse
Leopard			
Lion			
Lizard			Described are the lizard and giant lizard
Monkey			
Mule			
Octopus			Described are the octopus and giant octopus
Owl			
Pony			Described are the pony and warpony
Porpoise			
Rat			Example of a monster posing little threat to the characters in the game, suitable for play at lowest level.
Raven			
Rhinoceros			
Shark			Described are the medium-size, large, and huge shark
Snake			Described are the constrictor, giant constrictor, tiny viper, medium-size viper, large viper, and huge viper
Squid			Described are the squid and giant squid
Tiger			
Toad			
Weasel			
Whale			Described are the baleen whale, cachalot whale, and orca whale
Wolf			
Wolverine			
Vermin			Creatures like "wasps, spiders, and centipedes (albeit 'huge' or 'monstrous')" are adapted into the game in their own chapter as "another split from the "animal" category", which in Chrulew's view "figure the abject and excluded. In D&D, vermin [...] represent most clearly a bare life [as coined by Giorgio Agamben] that may be killed without hesitation; violence against such wholly other creatures is completely deproblematized."
Giant ant			Described are the worker giant ant, soldier giant ant, and queen giant ant
Giant bee			
Giant beetle			Described are the giant bombardier beetle, giant fire beetle, and giant stag beetle
Giant praying mantis			
Giant wasp			
Monstrous centipede			Described are the tiny, small, medium-size, large, huge, gargantuan, and colossal monstrous centipede. Giant centipedes are "low-level monsters", one-foot long red many-legged creatures.
Monstrous scorpion			Described are the tiny, small, medium-size, large, huge, gargantuan, and colossal monstrous scorpion. Scorpions have the distinction of having been the very first combat encounter in the first playtest, run by Gary Gygax, of the original version of the game. Scorpion the size of a horse, its stinger carries a deadly poison.
Monstrous spider			Described are the tiny, small, medium-size, large, huge, gargantuan, and colossal monstrous spider
Templates			A set of thematic changes that could be applied to a creature or character.
Celestial creatures			Template; sample celestial creature is a celestial lion
Fiendish creatures			Template; sample fiendish creature is a dire rat
Ghost			Template; sample ghost is a 5th-level human fighter. Inspired by Gothic fiction, a typical denizen of the Ravenloft setting.
Half-celestial			Template; sample half-celestial is a unicorn
Half-dragon			Template; sample half-dragon is an ogre
Half-fiend			Template; sample half-fiend is a medusa
Lich			Template; sample lich is an 11th-level human wizard. Emaciated undead spellcaster, a "classic" monster of the game.
Lycanthrope			Template; described are the werebear, wereboar, wererat, weretiger, and werewolf. Afflicted shapechangers, whose condition could be transmitted like a disease; some available as player character races. Depiction of the werewolf is related to those in 1930s and 1940s Hollywood movies like The Wolf Man. Ranked sixth among the ten best low-level monsters by the authors of Dungeons & Dragons For Dummies: "a classic monster", interesting due to shapechanging because "players can never be entirely sure whether that surly villager might indeed be the great black wolf who attacked their characters out in the forest." The presence of lycanthropes in the gaming system is one of the elements that has led Christian fundamentalists to condemn Dungeons & Dragons and to associate it with the occult. Screen Rant has described the operation of lycanthropy in the game as an aspect that "makes no sense" because it is often a positive development for a character. "It is possible for a character to be infected with lycanthropy in Dungeons & Dragons and it comes highly recommended, as the benefits outweigh the negatives". It notes that "[i]n exchange for learning how to control your condition, you gain Damage Reduction, +2 to your Wisdom stat, the Scent ability, Low-Light Vision, a new Hit Dice, the Iron Will feat, and the ability to transform into a more powerful form". An illustration in one edition of the Monster Manual implied that the beast in Disney's Beauty and the Beast was a lycanthrope, with a creature having a resemblance to the Beast attacking a human resembling that film's antagonist, Gaston. Present in the game since its inception, an image of a werewolf's face by Gygax' childhood friend Tom Keogh was "[a]lmost certainly the oldest piece of art" in the original D&D.
Vampire			Template; sample creature is a fifth-level human fighter. Depiction is related to those in 1930s and 1940s Hollywood Dracula movies, as well as folklore and Gothic fiction; a typical denizen of the Ravenloft setting, and "classic" monster of the game.

== WTC 11832 – Monster Compendium – Monsters of Faerûn (2001) ==
Creature	Other Appearances	Variants	Description
Aarakocra			In 2020, Comic Book Resources counted the aarakocra as # 9 on the list of "10 Powerful Monster Species That You Should Play As", stating that "As long as they're not wearing heavy or medium armor you have a flying sniper, essentially."
Aballin			
Abishai			Described are the white, black, green, blue and red abishai, baatezu subraces
Alaghi			
Asabi			Described are the asabi and stingtail
Banedead			
Baneguard			Described are the baneguard and direguard
Banelar			
Bat, Deep			Described are the bonebat, night hunter and sinister
Beast of Malar			Described are the hunting panther, claw slayer and bat form
Beholder Mage			A prestige class for beholders
Beholderkin, Death Kiss			
Beholderkin, Eyeball			
Beholderkin, Gouger			
Bullywug			
Chitine			
Choldrith			
Chosen One			
Cloaker Lord			
Crawling Claw			Screen Rant ranked the crawling claw among the 10 weakest monsters in 2018: "At best, you can use a bunch of them to act as a distraction or as a screen while another villain prepares a spell or trap."
Darkenbeast			
Dark Tree			
Deepspawn			Described are the deepspawn and its spawn
Demon, Ghour			
Demon, Yochlol			
Doppelganger, Greater			
Dragon			
-- Brown Dragon			
-- Deep Dragon			
-- Fang Dragon			
-- Shadow Dragon			Reviewer Philippe Tessier found the shadow dragon a very dangerous foe in frontal assault.
-- Song Dragon			
Dragonkin			
Dread Warrior			
Dwarf, Faerûnian			Described are the shield dwarves, gold dwarves, duergar, arctic dwarves, urdunnir and wild dwarves. The duergar are "the infamous dark dwarves", an "evil and avaricious" dwarven subrace with psionic powers. ComicBook.com contributor Christian Hoffer considered the struggle of the duergar with their dwarven cousins one "of the great conflicts that make up the D&D multiverse". Backstab reviewer Michaël Croitoriu found the duergar interesting as a player character option.
Firenewt			
Ghaunadan			
Giant			Described are the fog and phaerlin giant
Giant Strider			
Gibberling			Humanoid "hairy screaming monsters that attack in large groups and seek to devour everything in their path", "little more than mindless beasts". Screen Rant reviewer Scott Baird ranked them among the weakest monsters in the game, which have a scary description, but lack the stats to back up this impression.
Goblin, Dekanter			
Golem, Gemstone			Described are the ruby, emerald and diamond golem
Golem, Thayan			
Green Warder			
Groundling			
Gulguthydra			
Half-fiend, Draegloth			
Helmed horror			
Hybsil			
Ibrandlin			
Ice Serpent			
Leucrotta			
Malaugrym			Black Gate magazine found the malaugrym collectively as a villainous opposition "eminently suitable for campaign play", a "numerically tiny yet deadly threat" of an organization.
Meazel			
Myrlochar			
Nishruu			
Nyth			
Peryton			
Phaerimm			
Planetouched, Genasi			Described are the air, earth, fire and water genasi. Gus Wezerek, for FiveThirtyEight, reported that of the 5th Edition "class and race combinations per 100,000 characters that players created on D&D Beyond from" August 15 to September 15, 2017, genasi were the seventh most created at 5,971 total. The three most popular class combinations with the genasi were Monk (750), Sorcerer (648), and Druid (584). Wezerek noted "some of the common character choices can be explained by the game's structure of racial bonuses".
Planetouched, Tiefling			Described are the fey'ri and tanarukk
Pterafolk			A flying saurian folk.
Quaggoth			
Shalarin			
Sharn			
Siv			
Spectral Panther			
Spider, Subterranean			Described are the hairy and sword spider
Stinger			
Tall Mouther			
Tomb Tapper			
Unicorn, Black			
Wemic			
Zombie, Tyrantfog			
Beast of Xvim			Template; sample creature is a hell hound beast of Xvim
Curst			Template; sample creature is a 5th-level human fighter curst. The curst had the distinction of being the first piece of publication with references to the immensely detailed Forgotten Realms setting.
Ghost			Template; sample creatures are the doomsphere, ghost dragon, spectral harpist, watchghost and Zhentarim spirit
Lich			Template; sample creatures are the alhoon (illithilich) and banelich. The alhoon is described as even more powerful than other illithids because it has developed "powerful sorcery to augment their already fearsome psionic powers".
Lich, Good	Lost Ships (1990) (Archlich)		Template; sample creatures are the archlich and baelnorn
Lycanthrope			Template; sample creatures are the werebat, werecrocodile, wereshark, lythari and werecat
Revenant			Template; sample creature is a 7th-level elven sorcerer revenant
Yuan-ti			Template; sample creatures are a 5th-level human rogue tainted one and a 5th-level human rogue broodguard

== WTC 11835 – Psionics Handbook (2001) ==
Creature	Other Appearances	Variants	Description
Astral Construct (1st through 9th Level)			Construct of raw ectoplasm that can be molded to any form by the summoner (defaults to a roughly humanoid form).
Blue			A blue-skinned goblin that is somewhat smaller than an average goblin.
Brain Mole	Eldritch Wizardry (1976), Monster Manual (1977), The Complete Psionics Handbook (1991)		Small rodent that is virtually identical to its common relative.
Caller in Darkness			A swirling mist that contains tens of horror-struck humanoid faces.
Cerebrilith			Humanoid in shape, roughly 8 feet (2.4 m) tall with an elongated skull that joins with its hunched back.
Crysmal	Monster Manual II (1983)		Crystalline scorpion-like body with 6–8 legs and a sharp stinger.
Folugub			A beetle creature roughly 6 feet (1.8 m) long and 180 pounds.
Githyanki	Fiend Folio (1981)		Humanoid with gaunt features, yellowed skin, and jet black hair.
Githzerai	Fiend Folio (1981)		Humanoid with gaunt features, skin of yellow-green, and clawed fingers.
Intellect Devourer	Eldritch Wizardry (1976), Monster Manual (1977), The Complete Psionics Handbook (1991)		A brain-shaped body supported by four legs with clawed feet. SyFy Wire in 2018 called it one of "The 9 Scariest, Most Unforgettable Monsters From Dungeons & Dragons", saying that "The idea of having your brain consumed and just becoming an evil puppet is truly terrible."
Neothelid	The Illithiad (1998)		Worm-like creature 10 feet (3.0 m) in diameter and 100 feet (30 m) long with four long tentacles protruding from the lamprey-like maw.
Phthisic			Warped resemblance of the individual from which it was spawned, standing roughly 10 feet (3.0 m) tall with spines, sharp teeth, and claws.
Psion-Killer			A crystal golem that is roughly 10 feet (3.0 m) tall and 2,500 pounds.
Puppeteer			Small brown-colored leech lacking limbs or sensory organs.
Temporal Filcher			Four armed, one legged creature with thick torso, neck, and head which has a single horn.
Thought Eater	Eldritch Wizardry (1976), Monster Manual (1977), The Complete Psionics Handbook (1991)		A skeleton with scraps of flesh resembling a large feline but with claws and skull resembling a bird of prey.
Udoroot			Carnivorous plant consisting of a large bulb below the surface and six 'crowns' resembling sun flowers above the surface.

== WTC 11836 – Forgotten Realms – Campaign Setting (2001) ==
Creature	Other Appearances	Variants	Description
Animal			Described are the pack lizard, riding lizard, spitting crawler, two-headed adder, winged viper and tressym
Beholder, Death Tyrant			
Dracolich			Template. Ranked among the strongest monsters in the game by Scott Baird from Screen Rant. It was also one of the first new creatures introduced for the Forgotten Realms campaign setting.
Gargoyle, Kir-Lanan			
Rothé			Described are the deep, ghost and surface rothé
Shade			Template; sample creature is Leevoth, a 3rd-level wizard/8th-level fighter shade. For reviewer Philippe Tessier a monster in the spirit of Fiend Folio. Black Gate magazine rated the shades of the Forgotten Realms' lost kingdom of Netheril collectively as an "ancient and arcane" threat "eminently suitable for campaign play".

== WTC 11850 – Manual of the Planes (2001) ==
Creature	Other Appearances	Variants	Description
Astral Dreadnought			Arcane considered these monsters to "populate their periphery with true terror". Originally called ethereal dreadnought.
Bariaur			Centaur-like creature, a player character race in the Planescape setting, where reviewer Johnny L. Wilson found they fill a similar niche than dwarves. They are "fierce fighters and congenial sojourners - as long as you don't serve meat or befriend any giants".
Celestial			Two varieties listed below.
--Firre (Eladrins)			
--Leonal (Guardinal)			
Demon			Three varieties listed below.
--Uridezu (Tanar'ri)			
--Armanite (Tanar'ri)			
--Goristro (Tanar'ri)			
Devil			Two varieties listed below.
--Spinagon (Baatezu)			
--Narzugon (Baatezu)			
Energon			Two varieties listed below.
--Xag-Ya			
--Xeg-Yi			
Ephemera			Three varieties listed below.
--Dusk Beast			
--Ecalypse			
--Umbral Banyan			
Genie			Two varieties listed below.
--Dao			
--Marid			
Githyanki			Xenophobic humanoids with gaunt stature, leathery yellow skin and fangs. Inhabitants of the Astral Plane, and ancient enemies of the githzerai, githyanki are considered to "boast some excellent twists" as non-player characters, but "little more than dextrous, not to mention ugly, egg layers" as PCs by reviewer Trenton Webb Introduced by Charles Stross in White Dwarf No. 12, and officially included in the game in Fiend Folio (1981) and featured on its cover. The name was borrowed the name from a fictional race in George R. R. Martin's Dying of the Light. The githyanki/illithid relationship was inspired by Larry Niven's World of Ptavvs. The githyanki were voted among the top ten best monsters from that White Dwarf's "Fiend Factory" column. Shannon Applecline considered the githyanki one of the game's especially notable monsters. Scott Baird of the website TheGamer commented on the nature of the relationship of the githyanki to the mind flayers, to whom they were formerly enslaved: "Despite their wicked reputation, the Githyanki have an important role to play in protecting the Prime Material Plane. The Githyanki despise Mind Flayers and their armies might be the only thing holding them back. The trailer for Baldur's Gate 3 shows just how scary a single Mind Flayer ship can be, and that could happen a thousand times over if the Githyanki aren't around." ComicBook.com contributor Christian Hoffer considered "the conflict between the otherworldly githzerai and githyanki" one "of the great conflicts that make up the D&D multiverse", and praised the expanded lore presented in Mordenkainen's Tome of Foes as "certainly useful as both inspiration and as research material for building a D&D campaign."
Githzerai			Designed by Charles Stross, these humanoids are the ancient and fervent enemies of mind flayers, to whom they were formerly enslaved, and the githyanki; they are based on the plane of Limbo. A playable species in the Planescape campaign setting, reviewer Johnny L. Wilson found them a new take on the niche usually occupied by elves. Shannon Applecline considered the githzerai one of the game's especially notable monsters, while ComicBook.com contributor Christian Hoffer counted "the conflict between the otherworldly githzerai and githyanki" among "the great conflicts that make up the D&D multiverse", and praised the expanded lore presented in Mordenkainen's Tome of Foes as "certainly useful as both inspiration and as research material for building a D&D campaign."
Inevitable			Three varieties listed below.
--Zelekhut			
--Kolyarut			
--Marut			
Mercane			
Paraelemental			Varieties include: Ice, Magma, Ooze, and Smoke. Levels include: Small, Medium, Large, Huge, Greater, and Elder.
Yugoloth			"fiend for hire native to the plane of Gehenna"
--Canoloth			
--Mezzoloth			
--Nycaloth			
--Ultroloth			
Half-Elemental			Template
Shadow Creatures			Template
Elemental Creatures			Template
Wood Element Creatures			Template
Axiomatic Creatures			Template
Anarchic Creatures			Template
Petitioner			Template

== WTC 12015 – Oriental Adventures (2001) ==
Creature	Other Appearances	Variants	Description
Bajang			Evil nature spirit that resembles a short, fat humanoid with claw-like hands and feet.
Bakemono			
Bisan			
Bog Hag			
Buso, Tigbanua			
Centipede, Spirit			
Doc Cu'o'c			
Dokufu			
Dragon, Lung			Any of eight powerful and intelligent spirit creatures of various forms based on their 'elemental' types (listed below).
– Yu Lung (Carp Dragon)			Body of a large carp with reptilian head and forearms and a beard. Juvenile form of all lung dragons.
– Chiang Lung (River Dragon)			Long, eel-like body with four short limbs ending in webbed feet and has multicolored beard and long horns.
– Li Lung (Earth Dragon)			Body of a lion with a humanoid face and wings with long, peacock-like feathers.
– Lung Wang (Sea Dragon)			Body of a turtle with fin-like appendages and a reptilian head, whiskers, and horns.
– Pan Lung (Coiled Dragon)			Long, thin, multicolored reptilian body with a vibrant mane and dark whiskers.
– Shen Lung (Spirit Dragon)			Reptilian body with clawed feet, spike-covered tail, spined back, and with two horns on the top of the head.
– T'ien Lung (Celestial Dragon)			Long, serpentine body that wraps about itself, brightly colored mane and whiskers and golden beard.
– Tun Mi Lung (Typhoon Dragon)			Resembles a multicolored salamander with a large mouth and sharp clawed feet.
Gaki			Undead spirits of mortals who must serve punishment for their actions. Types: Jiki-niku-gaki (commoners), Shikki-gaki (healers), Shinen-gaki (soldiers), Jiki-ketsu-gaki (shamans, monks).
Ghost			Adaptation of standard ghosts to an oriental campaign. Also, brief descriptions of Akikage (ninja assassin), Chu-u (legless ghost), Con-tinh (maiden), Hanging Ghost (ghost of a suicide), Kuei (unavenged spirit), and Ubume (death during childbirth).
Hannya			Upper body of an old woman with forked tongue, lower body of a serpent.
Hebi-No-Onna			Attractive human female clad with many gemstones and with snakes hidden within their sleeves.
Hengeyokai			Shapeshifter that can be in animal, half-animal half-human, or human forms.
Hopping Vampire			Body of a poorly buried individual that returns to semi-life. Remains partially rigid and must 'hop' to move.
Kappa			Short, stooped humanoid with a turtle shell for a back, webbed and clawed feet and hands, green skin, and an indentation on the top of the head that holds a small amount of lake water.
Ki-Rin			Resembles a unicorn with gold scales and a thick mane. Based on the kirin from Japanese mythology, an example of the diverse cultures amalgamated into D&D. Black Gate reviewer Howard Andrew Jones called them "old stalwarts" of the game.
Korobokuru			Wild and unkempt oriental dwarves that resemble their common counterparts.
Mamono			Shapeshifter that appear skinless with a single eye in their forehead, long razor-like blades for arms and a large mouth in their abdomen in their natural form.
Naga, Shinomen			Human head and body with a serpentine tail in place of legs. Includes five bloodlines: Greensnake, Chameleon, Asp, Cobra, and Constrictor.
Nat			Lesser spirit that appears like a short humanoid with bright skin, long claws, dark hair, and fangs. Includes Einsaung Nat, Hkum Yeng Nat, and Lu Nat subtypes.
Nature Spirit			In natural form appears like a piece of nature (rock, tree, etc.). Commonly seen in humanoid form.
Nezumi			Appear like giant rats that walk on their hind legs.
Oni			Any of three varieties of giant humanoids with animal features (listed below).
– Common Oni			8 feet (2.4 m) tall and extremely muscular, covered with coarse hair and with long fangs and horns.
– Go-Zu Oni			Slightly larger than Common Oni but with the head of a bull.
– Me-Zu Oni			10 feet (3.0 m) tall and 1000 pounds with the head of a horse.
Oni, Shadowlands			Any of twelve varieties of evil outsiders (listed below).
– Haino no Oni			
– Ashi no Oni			
– Sanru no Oni			
– Kamu no Oni			
– Shikibu no Oni			
– Ugulu no Oni			
– Akuma no Oni			
– Kyoso no Oni			
– Yattoko no Oni			
– Byoko no Oni			
– Gekido no Oni			
– Tsuburu no Oni			
Onikage			
Pennagogolan			
Rokuro-Kubi			
Shirokinu-Katsukami			
Spirit Folk			
Tako			
Tasloi			
Tengu			
Toad, Giant			
Tsuno			
Wang-Liang			
Yeti			
Yuki-On-Na			

== WTC 88158 – Savage Species (2003) ==
Creature	Other Appearances	Variants	Description
Feral Creature			Template to be added to any corporeal humanoid or monstrous humanoid. A sample Feral Minotaur is described.
Gelatinous Creature			Template to be added to any living creature except an ooze. A sample Gelatinous Brown Bear is described.
Ghost Brute			Template to be added to any animal, magical beast, or plant with a Charisma score below 8. A sample Ghost Hound is described.
Incarnate Construct			Template to be added to any construct creature with a humanoid form. A sample Incarnate Stone Golem is described.
Insectile Creature			Template to be added to any giant, humanoid, or monstrous humanoid. A sample Insectile Ogre is described.
Monstrous Beast			Template to be added to any animal or vermin. A sample Monstrous Stag Beetle is described.
Multiheaded Creature			Template to be added to any corporeal creature that has a discernible head. A sample Multiheaded Hell Hound is described.
Mummified Creature			Template to be added to any corporeal animal, giant, or humanoid. A sample Mummified Ogre is described.
Reptilian Creature			Template to be added to any humanoid, monstrous humanoid, or giant. A sample Reptilian Bugbear is described.
Spectral Creature			Template to be added to any aberration, animal, dragon, giant, humanoid, magical beast, or monstrous humanoid. A sample Spectral Cloaker is described.
Symbiotic Creature			Template to be added to any two living creatures of the following types: animal, humanoid, plant, or vermin. One of the two must be two size categories smaller than the other. A sample Symbiosis of a Bugbear and a Stirge is described.
Tauric Creature			Template combining one small or medium corporeal humanoid or monstrous humanoid and one medium or large corporeal animal, magical beast, or vermin with four or more legs. A sample Tauric of a Griffon and Hobgoblin is described.
Umbral Creature			Template to be added to any aberration, animal, dragon, giant, humanoid, magical beast, or monstrous humanoid. A sample Umbral Ettin is described.
Wight			Template to be added to any humanoid. A sample Troglodyte Wight is described.
Winged Creature			Template to be added to any animal, giant, humanoid, monstrous humanoid, or vermin. A sample Winged Dog is described.
Wraith			Template to be added to any humanoid. A sample Kobold Wraith is described. Inspired by Gothic fiction, a typical denizen of the Ravenloft setting.
Yuan-Ti			The "Tainted One" and "Broodguard" templates may be added to any human. A sample Yuan-Ti Tainted One is described.
Anthropomorphic Animal			Template to be added to any non-dire animal. A sample Anthropomorphic Donkey is described.
Desmodu			
Loxo			
Thri-Kreen			"Praying mantis man" with four arms and a poisonous bite, "invented by Paul Reiche III for the AD&D Monster Cards Set 2 (1982)", reviewer Mark Theurer considered them an "old personal favorite". With their additional limbs and specialized chatkcha and gythka weapons, thri-kreen were infamous as player characters optimized to do extreme amounts of damage. J.R. Zambrano found them "an interesting race" and preferred their "2nd Edition aesthetic" to others.

== WTC 88159 – Arms and Equipment Guide (2003) ==
Creature	Other Appearances	Variants	Description
Beetle Buckler			
Climbdog			
Thudhunter			
Axebeak			
Hippocampus			Based on medieval bestiaries. "Depicted as the front half of a horse and the rear half of a fish or sea-serpent." Tyler Linn of Cracked.com listed it among the "15 Most Idiotic Monsters In Dungeons & Dragons History". He did not think " it would pose much of a threat" "and was intended to be one of the good guys", but found the depiction "douchey".
Equine Golem			
Zaratan			
Soarwhale			
Giant Dragonfly			
Giant Firefly			
Jade Locust			

== WTC 88161 – Book of Vile Darkness (2002) ==
Creature	Other Appearances	Variants	Description
Demon			Described are the Mane (Tanar'ri), Rutterkin (Tanar'ri), Bar-Igura (Tanar'ri), Babau (Tanar'ri), Shadow Demon, and Chasme (Tanar'ri).
Devil			Described are the Kocrachon (Baatezu) and Ghargatula (Baatezu).
Eye of Fear and Flame	Fiend Folio (1981)		The Fiend Folio's illustration of the eye of fear and flame was used by Richard Garfield for the prototype of the Lich card during the development of his Magic: The Gathering card game.
Kython			Described are the Broodling, Juvenile Kython, Adult Kython, Impaler, Slaymaster, and Slaughterking.
Vaath			
Vilewight			
Bone Creature			Template to be added to any nonundead, corporeal creature with a skeletal system. A sample Bone Bugbear Rogue is described.
Corpse Creature			Template to be added to any nonundead, nonconstruct, nonplant corporeal creature. A sample Corpse Human Barbarian is described.
Corrupted Creature			Template to be added to any corporeal creature that is not an outsider. A sample Corrupted Wolf is described.

== WTC 88165 – Deities And Demigods (2002) ==
Creature	Other Appearances	Variants	Description
Cyclops			Giant humanoid notable for a single eye in the forehead; from the Olympian pantheon. One-eyed giants based on Greek mythology. Ranked tenth among the ten best mid-level 4th Edition monsters by the authors of Dungeons & Dragons 4th Edition For Dummies.
Faun			Woodland humanoid of the Olympian pantheon.
Minion of Set			Warrior servant of the evil god Set from the Pharaonic pantheon.
Mummy, Greater			Template added to a humanoid character. Also includes a sample Greater Mummy.
Einherjar			Fallen warrior chosen to fight at the time of Ragnarok.
Valkyries			Quasi-deity female warrior of the Asgardian pantheon. Based on the Valkyries of Norse mythology who chose men who died in battle to join Odin, but also influenced by the intermediate reception in Richard Wagner's The Ring of the Nibelung.

== WTC 88169 – Epic Level Handbook (2002) ==
Creature	Other Appearances	Variants	Description
Abomination			The unwanted offspring of a deity and another being. Immortal, spiteful, destructive creatures of immense power. Tyler Linn of Cracked.com identified the atropal as one of "15 Idiotic Dungeons and Dragons Monsters" in 2009, describing it as "a stillborn god-fetus risen from the dead to confuse everyone at the end of 2001: A Space Odyssey." He comments: "Despite possessing godlike powers and being metal as fuck, the Atropal at its core is still just a dead fetus. Here's a general rule for undead creatures: If the thing wasn't any kind of threat when it was alive, it's probably not going to be any more of a problem in its slower, decomposing form." Screen Rant compiled a list of the game's "10 Most Powerful (And 10 Weakest) Monsters, Ranked" in 2018, calling this one of the strongest, saying "An atropal might not be the most powerful creature on this list but it is easily the most fearsome to look at." The atropal appeared on the 2018 Screen Rant top list at #20 on " Dungeons & Dragons: The 20 Most Powerful Creatures, Ranked", and Scott Baird highlighted that "You may think that you can protect yourself from the negative energy aura with magic, but the atropal can cast greater dispelling at will."
Behemoth			Enormously large version of an animal originating on another plane. Described are the behemoth eagle and behemoth gorilla
Brachyurus			
Colossus			Described are the stone colossus, flesh colossus, and iron colossus
Demilich			Evolved beyond status as a lich. Creature of enormous powers, where only the skull remains. Tyler Linn of Cracked.com identified the demi-lich as one of "15 Idiotic Dungeons and Dragons Monsters" in 2009, stating: "Besides looking like a Pirates of the Caribbean alarm clock, the Demi-lich seems to possess no tactical advantages of any kind. It just kind of floats around, waiting for a party of heroes to smack it out of the air like a pinata. We suppose it could try to bite you, but the illustration above kind of makes it look like the jaw is fused in place. Man, now we just feel sorry for it." Ranked among the strongest in Screen Rant's "10 Most Powerful (And 10 Weakest) Monsters, Ranked", saying "You might think that a floating skull would be easy to smash to pieces, but you would be wrong, as demiliches are some of the most resilient creatures in the game."
Devastation vermin			Described are the devastation centipede, devastation spider, devastation scorpion, and devastation beetle
Dragon, advanced			
Dragon, epic			Described are the force dragon and prismatic dragon. The prismatic dragon was ranked among the strongest monsters in the game by Scott Baird from Screen Rant: In its eldest version it "represents the ultimate challenge for any party of adventurers, though it would easily dispose of all but the most insanely overleveled groups."
Elemental, primal			Described are the air, earth, fire, and water primal elementals
Genius loci			
Gibbering orb			
Gloom			
Golem			Described are the mithral golem and adamantine golem
Ha-naga			
Hagunemnon (protean)			
Hoary hunter			Described are the hoary hunter and hoary steed
Hunefer			
Lavawight			
Legendary animal			Animal studies scholar Matthew Chrulew assumed that these creatures based on mundane animals but "of magnified power—through a multiplication of their ability scores" were designed for the game because "[o]nly in this way might they provide a significant challenge." Described are the legendary bear and legendary tiger.
LeShay			Screen Rant compiled a list of the game's "10 Most Powerful (And 10 Weakest) Monsters, Ranked" in 2018, calling this one of the strongest, saying "The average human could be taken down by a cat. The average leShay could take down an army."
Living vault			
Mercane			
Mu spore			
Neh-thalggu (brain collector)			
Paragon mind flayer			Template; the paragon mind flayer is the sample creature for the paragon creature template
Prismasaurus			
Pseudonatural troll			Template; the pseudonatural troll is the sample creature for the pseudonatural creature template
Ruin swarm			
Shadow of the void			
Shape of fire			
Sirrush			
Slaad			Described are the white slaad and black slaad
Tayellah			
Thorciasid			
Titan, elder			
Treant, elder			
Umbral blot (blackball)			
Uvuudaum			
Vermiurge			
Winterwight			
Worm that walks			

== WTC 88268 – Monster Manual II (2002) ==
Creature	Other Appearances	Variants	Description
Abeil			Described are the Vassal, Soldier, and Queen.
Ash Rat			
Asperi			
Automaton			Described are the Pulverizer and Hammerer.
Avolakia			
Banshee			Inspired by Gothic fiction, a typical denizen of the Ravenloft setting.
Bladeling			
Blood Ape			
Boggle			
Bogun			
Bone Naga			
Bone Ooze			
Braxat			
Breathdrinker			
Bronze Serpent			
Captured One			Template to be added to a preexisting monster.
Catoblepas			David M. Ewalt described it as "an overweight buffalo with stumpy legs, a giraffe-like neck, and a warthog's head". An "old personal favorite" of reviewer Mark Theurer. Black Gate editor Howard Andrew Jones remarked on their presence throughout the game's history.
Celestial			Described are the Cervidal and Lupinal.
Chain Golem			
Chaos Roc			
Chimeric Creature			Template to be added to a preexisting monster.
Cloaked Ape			
Clockwork Horror			Described are the Electrum, Gold, Platinum, and Adamantine Horrors.
Cloud Ray			
Corollax			
Corpse Gatherer			
Crimson Death			
Darktentacles			
Death Knight			Template to be added to a preexisting monster. A "powerful undead warrior", Shannon Applecline considered this creature created by Charles Stross one of the game's especially notable monsters.
Deathbringer			
Demon			Described are the Abyssal Maw, Abyssal Skulker, Abyssal Ravager, Jovoc (Tanar'ri), Palrethee (Tanar'ri), Zovvut, Jarilith (Tanar'ri), and Kelvezu (Tanar'ri).
Desmodu			
Desmodu Bat			Described are the Hunting Bat, Guard Bat, and War Bat.
Devil			Described are the Advespa (Baatezu), Amnizu (Baatezu), and Malebranche (Baatezu).
Dinosaur			Described are the Cryptoclidus, Allosaurus, Ankylosaurus, Quetzalcoatlus, Seismosaurus, and Spinosaurus.
Dire Animal			Larger and more aggressive versions of an ordinary animal. Animal studies scholar Matthew Chrulew assumed that dire versions of mundane animals were designed for the game because "[o]nly in this way might they provide a significant challenge or aid." Described are the Dire Horse, Elk, Elephant, Toad, Hawk, and Snake.
Dragon, Gem			Described are the Amethyst, Crystal, Emerald, Sapphire, and Topaz Dragons. Dragons of neutral alignment. Reviewer Mark Theurer remarked that "They have some interesting breath weapons".
Dread Guard			
Dune Stalker			
Effigy			
Elemental Weird			Described are the Air, Earth, Fire, and Water Weirds. The water weird is an "old personal favorite" of reviewer Mark Theurer.
Ether Scarab			
Ethereal Doppelganger			
Ethereal Slayer			
Famine Spirit			
Felldrake			Described are the Crested Felldrake, Spitting Felldrake, and Horned Felldrake.
Fiendwurm			
Fihyr			Described are the common and Great Fihyr.
Firbolg			Bleeding Cool found the firbolg one "of the more distinctive race options in the D&D multiverse". In 2021, Comic Book Resources counted the firbolg as one of the "7 Underused Monster Races in Dungeons & Dragons", stating that "Firbolgs are a blend of strength and magic, making them useful for classes that blend the two. Firbolgs work well as Clerics and Druids, but they can also make for a good Ranger. Your harmony with nature will leave you definitely wanting to have a nature focus, but you'll also stand out in a crowd. As a naturally shy race, be sure to consider that when playing your character. Typically speaking, Firbolgs aren't aggressive."
Fire Bat			
Flesh Jelly			
Fomorian			
Forest Sloth			
Frost Salamander			
Galeb Duhr			
Gambol			
Giant			Described are the Forest, Sun, Ocean, and Mountain Giants.
Glimmerskin			
Golem			Described are the Stained Glass, Brass, and Dragonflesh Golems.
Gravecrawler			
Gravorg			
Greenvise			
Grell			"terrifying beaked, tentacled monsters that populate the realm of Underdark". Tyler Linn of Cracked.com listed the grell among the "15 Most Idiotic Monsters In Dungeons & Dragons History" and found that it's movement by floating contributed to it looking ridiculous.
Grimalkin			
Grizzly Mastodon			
Half-Fiend (Durzagon)			
Half-Golem			
Hellfire Wyrm			
Hook Horror			The hook horror was first published in White Dwarf #12 (April–May 1979), and was originally submitted by Ian Livingstone. It was voted among the top ten monsters from the magazine's "Fiend Factory" column and reprinted in Best of White Dwarf Articles (1980). Ed Greenwood, in his review of the Fiend Folio for Dragon magazine, considered the hook horror as one of the creatures with "strange appearances and little else; there is no depth to their listings" and that it was one of the creatures which "seem incomplete".
Immoth			
Ixitxachitl			Described are the Average and Vampiric Ixitxachitl. An "old personal favorite" of reviewer Mark Theurer.
Jahi			
Jermlaine			
Juggernaut			
Julajimus			
Kopru			
Leechwalker			
Legendary Animal			Described are the Legendary Eagle, Ape, Wolf, Snake, Horse, Bear, Tiger, and Shark.
Leviathan			The leviathan is based on the creature from Hebrew mythology.
Linnorm			Described are the Gray Linnorm, Dread Linnorm, and Corpse Tearer. Reviewer Mark Theurer remarked about Linnorm dragons that these giant "dragon-like beings that might best be described as feral dragons" really piqued his interest, and characterized the Corpse Tearer as "old, smart, and vicious", the dread linnorm as the "largest [of the Linnorms] and has two frickin' heads", and the gray linnorm as "small [for a Linnorm dragon], that means HUGE, and very aggressive".
Loxo			
Marrash			
Meenlock			
Megalodon			
Megapede			
Monster Of Legend			Template to be added to a preexisting monster.
Moonbeast			
Mooncalf			
Moonrat			
Morkoth			Paste magazine reviewer Cameron Kunzelmann found the morkoth an inventive and "super weird" monster beyond the game's staples.
Mudmaw			
Myconid			Described are the Junior Worker, Average Worker, Elder Worker, Guard, Circle Leader, and Sovereign. A "race of [man-sized] sentient fungus creatures", "some of which pack a mean punch", and which have the "ability to spray poisons that can disable their foes".
Needlefolk			First published in White Dwarf #6 (April 1978), submitted by Trevor Graver. It was voted among the top ten monsters from the magazine's "Fiend Factory" column and reprinted in Best of White Dwarf Articles (1980).
Neogi			Described are the Neogi Spawn, Adult Neogi, and Great Old Master Neogi.
Nethersight Mastiff			
Nightmare Beast			
Nimblewright			
Ocean Strider			
Orcwort			Described are the Wortling and adult Orcwort.
Ormyrr			
Phase Wasp			
Phoenix			
Planetouched			Described are the Chaond and Zenythri.
Psurlon			Described are the Average, Elder, and Giant Psurlons.
Ragewind			
Raggamoffyn			Described are the Tatterdemanimal, Common Raggamoffyn, Guttersnipe, and Shrapnyl. CJ Miozzi included the raggamoffyn on The Escapist's list of "The Dumbest Dungeons & Dragons Monsters Ever (And How To Use Them)".
Rampager			
Razor Boar			Template to be added to a preexisting monster.
Reason Stealer			
Red Sundew			
Rogue Eidolon			
Rukarazyll			
Runic Guardian			
Scorpionfolk			Template to be added to a preexisting monster.
Shadow Spider			
Sirine			
Spawn Of Kyuss			
Spell Weaver			
Spellgaunt			
Spellstitched			Template to be added to a preexisting monster.
Spirit of the Land			
Stone Spike			
Swamplight Lynx			
Sylph			
Tauric			Template to be added to a preexisting monster.
Tempest			
Teratomorph			
Thri-Kreen			
Titanic			Template to be added to a preexisting monster.
Twig blight			Small plant creature that hides among healthy foliage.
Vaporighu			
Warbeast			Template to be added to a preexisting monster.
Windghost			
Wyste			
Yak Folk			
Yugoloth			Described are the Marraenoloth, Arcanaloth, and Yagnoloth.

== WTC 88661 – Fiend Folio (2003) ==
Creature	Other Appearances	Variants	Description
Abrian			
Abyssal Ghoul			
Ahuizotl			This appearance differs significantly from the descriptions in both 3rd edition Fiend Folio and Aztec mythology.
Aoa			Described are the Droplet and Sphere.
Aquatic Ooze			Described are the Bloodbloater, Flotsam Ooze, and Reekmurk.
Bacchae			
Bhut			
Blackstone Gigant			
Blood Hawk			
Bloodthorn			
Bonespear			
Canomorph			Described are the Haraknin, Shadurakul, and Vultivor.
Caryatid Column			
Century Worm			
Chronotyryn			
Chwidencha			
Crawling Head			
Crypt thing			
Dark Ones			Described are the Dark Creeper and Dark Stalker.
Darkweaver			
Death Dog			White Dwarf reviewer Jamie Thomson commented on the death dog, which is "rumored to be a descendant of Cerberus".
Demodand			Described are the Farastu, Kelubar, and Shator.
Demon			Described are the Alkilith (Tanar'ri), Blood Fiend, Klurichir (Tanar'ri), Maurezhi (Tanar'ri), Myrmyxicus (Tanar'ri), Skulvyn, and Wastrilith.
Deva			Described are the Monadic and Movanic Devas.
Devil			Described are the Paeliryon (Baatezu) and Xerfilstyx (Baatezu). CJ Miozzi included the paeliryon on The Escapist's list of "The Dumbest Dungeons & Dragons Monsters Ever (And How To Use Them)".
Dire Rhinoceros			
Disenchanter			
Ethereal Ooze			
Ethergaunt			Described are the Black, Red, and White Ethergaunts. Ethergaunts are ancient aberrations that once inhabited the Material Plane, but nearly ten millennia ago abandoned it for the Ethereal Plane.
Fensir			Described are the Fensir and Rakka.
Feytouched			
Fhorge			
Flame Snake			Described are the Minor, Lesser, and Greater Flame Snakes.
Formian			Described are the Armadon, Observer, and Winged Warrior.
Fossergrim			
Gathra			
Giant			Described are the Bog and Shadow Giants.
Golem			Described are the Blood Golem of Hextor, Brain Golem, Demonflesh Golem, and Hellfire Golem.
Half-Fey			Described are the Half-Fey Centaur and general Half-Fey template.
Half-Illithid			Described are the Half-Illithid Lizardfolk and general Half-Illithid template.
Half-Troll			Described are the Half-Troll Barbazu and general Half-Troll template.
Huecuva			Described are a sample Huecuva and the general Huecuva template.
Hullathoin			
Imp			Described are the Bloodbag, Euphoric, and Filth Imps.
Indricothere			
Inevitable			Described are the Quarut and Varakhut.
Iron Cobra			
Ironmaw			
Jackal Lord			
Jackalwere			An intelligent jackal with the ability to assume human and jackal-human-hybrid form and a sleep-inducing gaze.
Kaorti			
Keeper			
Kelp Angler			
Kelpie			
Khaasta			
Kuldurath			
Living Holocaust			
Lucent Worm			
Maelephant			
Maug			
Maulgoth			
Megatherium			
Mongrelfolk			
Necrophidius			Undead consisting of a humanoid skull and giant snake vertebrae, "looks like the skeleton of a Guardian Naga", with venomenous bite and mesmerizing powers; first published in White Dwarf #7 (June/July 1978), submitted by Simon Tilbrook. In 1980 it was voted the best monster from the magazine's "Fiend Factory" column.
Nerra			Described are the Kalareem, Sillit, and Varoot.
Octopus Tree			
Ocularon			
Ophidian			
Oread			
Phiuhl			
Planetouched			Described are the Maeluth, Mechanatrix, Shyft, and Wispling.
Quth-Maren			
Rilmani			Described are the Aurumach, Cuprilach, and Ferrumach.
Rukanyr			
Sarkrith			Described are the Spelleater and Thane.
Sea Drake			
Selkie			
Senmurv			
Shadar-Kai			
Shadow Asp			
Shedu			Lawful good winged equine with human-like head. Based on a creature from Mesopotamian mythology.
Skulk			
Skybleeder			
Slaad, Mud			
Slasrath			
Spectral Lurker			
Spirit of the Air			
Sporebat			
Spriggan			Described are the Natural and Enlarged Forms.
Steel Predator			
Sunwyrm			
Swarm			Described are the Abyssal Ant Swarm, Plague Ant Swarm, Cranium Rat Swarm (Lesser Pack, Average Pack, and Greater Pack), Locust Swarm (Bloodfiend and Rapture), Scarab Beetle Swarm, Viper Swarm, and Wasp Swarm. Cranium rats were ranked among the weakest monsters in the game by Scott Baird from Screen Rant. Only in higher numbers do they become more intelligent, psionic, and dangerous.
Swordwraith			
Terlen			
Terror Bird			
Thunder Worm			
Ti-Khana			Described are the Ti-Khana Deinonychus and general Ti-Khana template.
Tunnel Terror			
Ulgurstasta			
Varrangoin			Described are the Arcanist, Lesser, and Rager Varragoins.
Vine Horror			
Vorr			
Wendigo			Described are a sample Wendigo and the general Wendigo template.
Wicker Man			
Yellow Musk Creeper			Ben Woodard found it an expression of the "seemingly endless morphology of fungal creep and toxicological capacity" within the game. The Fiend Folio's illustration of the yellow musk creeper was used by Richard Garfield for the prototype of the Regrowth spell card during the development of his Magic: The Gathering game.
Yellow Musk Zombie			Described are the Yellow Musk Zombie Orc and general Yellow Musk Zombie template.
Yuan-Ti Anathema			
Yugoloth			Described are the Piscoloth and Skeroloth.
Yurian			
Zodar			The zodar appeared on the 2018 Screen Rant top list at No. 13 on " Dungeons & Dragons: The 20 Most Powerful Creatures, Ranked", and Scott Baird highlighted that "One of the most mysterious and powerful creatures in the Spelljammer universe are the Zodar, who resemble giant suits of armor. In their Advanced Dungeons & Dragons appearance, they had the maximum Strength score that was allowed in the game and they were immune to almost all forms of damage."

== WTC 96582 – Miniatures Handbook (2003) ==
Creature	Other Appearances	Variants	Description
Abyssal eviscerator	D&D Miniatures: Archfiends set #44 (2004)		
Aspect	Fiendish Codex II (2006) (Asmodeus, Mephistopheles), Dragon Magic (2006) (Bahamut, Tiamat)		Described are the aspect of Asmodeus, Bahamut, Demogorgon, Hextor, Kord, Lolth, Mephistopheles, Nerull, Orcus, Tiamat, and Vecna
Bright naga	D&D Miniatures: Dragoneye set		
Catfolk	D&D Miniatures: Archfiends set #11 (2004), Races of the Wild (2005)		
Cave dinosaurs			Described are the cave ankylosaurus, cave triceratops, and cave tyrannosaurus
Crucian	D&D Miniatures: Giants of Legend set #24 (2004), Sandstorm (2005)		
Cursed spirit	D&D Miniatures: Archfiends set #49 (2004)		
Displacer serpent	D&D Miniatures: Giants of Legend set #43 (2004)		
Equiceph			
Gravehound	D&D Miniatures: Archfiends set #41 (2004)		
Kruthik	D&D Miniatures: Deathknell set #37 (2005), Monster Manual (2008)		Described are the hatchling kruthik, adult kruthik, and greater kruthik
Mad slasher	D&D Miniatures: Aberrations set #54 (2004)		
Magma hurler	D&D Miniatures: War of the Dragon Queen set #49 (2006)		
Nothic	D&D Miniatures: Archfiends set #36 (2004)		
Phargion			
Protectar	D&D Miniatures: Giants of Legend set #11 (2004)		
Ramadeen			
Scaled stalker			
Shadow beast	D&D Miniatures: War Drums set		Described are the ghirrash, khumat, and thaskor
Spark lasher			
Stonechild	D&D Miniatures: Dragoneye set		
Walking wall	D&D Miniatures: War Drums set		

== See also ==
- Monsters in Dungeons & Dragons
- List of Dungeons & Dragons monsters (1974–76)
- List of Dungeons & Dragons monsters (1977–94)
- List of Advanced Dungeons & Dragons 2nd edition monsters
- List of Dungeons & Dragons 4th edition monsters
- List of Dungeons & Dragons 5th edition monsters
