= Tasha's Cauldron of Everything =

Role-playing game supplement

- Standard edition print cover. Art by Magali Villeneuve.
- Genre: Role-playing game
- Publisher: Wizards of the Coast
- Publication date: 17 November 2020
- Media type: Print (hardcover)
- Pages: 192
- ISBN: 978-0-7869-6702-5

Tasha's Cauldron of Everything is a sourcebook for the 5th edition of the Dungeons & Dragons fantasy role-playing game, published in 2020. The book is a supplement to the 5th edition Dungeon Master's Guide (2014) and Player's Handbook (2014).

== Contents ==
The book adds a variety of options for both players and Dungeon Masters along with marginalia by the archmage Tasha.

- Chapter 1: Character Options
  - Includes 26 new subclasses, 2 or 3 for each of the twelve previously existing character classes. Some subclasses have also appeared in other published campaign sourcebooks.
  - The addition of The Artificer class including the 3 subclasses previously published in Eberron: Rising from the Last War and one new subclass.
  - Optional character origin customization with rules that decouple a character's race or origin from their abilities
  - New feats and class features
- Chapter 2: Group Patrons
  - Adds a shared origin story and/or an ongoing narrative hook for adventuring parties
- Chapter 3: Magical Miscellany
  - 21 spells, including 3 new spells attributed to Tasha.
  - 36 magic items
  - Introducing a new type of wondrous item: magic tattoos, including 11 magical tattoo entries
- Chapter 4: Dungeon Master's Tools
  - Expanded rules options, such as session zero guidance
  - Advice on parley with monsters
  - Rules for sidekicks, natural hazards and supernatural environments
  - Puzzles

== Publication history ==
Tasha's Cauldron of Everything was published on November 17, 2020 and features cover art by Magali Villeneuve. An alternate cover is available only in local game stores with art by Wylie Beckert. On the hidden elements within the alternate cover art, Beckert said, "My favorite thing to hide within the image was the spell Tasha’s hideous laughter. In the art brief, this was meant to be a scroll with identifying text on it. But I wanted to find a more subtle way to show it, hence the possessed scroll of laughing imps and skulls. The art brief also called for Graz’zt to be 'looking flirtatious'. I figured the flirtiest he could get would be offering Tasha a uniquely demonic valentine".

The book features "in-character commentary from Tasha", as well as several new spells and magic items iconic of the character. The book also includes a "de-Eberroned" version of the group patron mechanic and of the artificer class and its subclasses, along with reprints of several subclasses that were previously published in other supplements for specific campaign settings: the Order Domain Cleric and Circle of Spores Druid from Guildmasters’ Guide to Ravnica, College of Eloquence Bard and Oath of Glory Paladin from Mythic Odysseys of Theros, and the Bladesinging Wizard from Sword Coast Adventurer’s Guide.

In August 2020, it was widely reported that the book would include "a new way to create characters that’s fully customizable and in line with the game’s push for diversity and representation". Jeremy Crawford said that the options would "better reflect the story you have in mind for the characters". Much of the information in Tasha’s Cauldron of Everything was developed through the public Unearthed Arcana playtest – of the playtest subclasses, Crawford said "almost every single one made it into the game".

In November 2020, Crawford contrasted the book's new optional character creation rules with the game's original racial ability score bonuses, saying "Contrary to what many people might think those ability score increases that are in those different options, they're not there for game balance purposes. They are there strictly to reinforce the different archetypes that have been in D&D going all the way back to the '70s. [...] It really has been just about archetype reinforcement, and because it's not there for game balance reasons we give people the option in Tasha's Cauldron to take whatever those bonuses are [...] put them in any ability score you want".

Dungeons & Dragons Rules Expansion Gift Set, a boxed set, contains Mordenkainen Presents: Monsters of the Multiverse (2022) along with new printings of Xanathar's Guide to Everything (2017) and Tasha's Cauldron of Everything; it was released on January 25, 2022. An exclusive edition, with white foil alternate art covers by Joy Ang, is only available through local game stores.

== Reception ==
=== Pre-release ===
In August 2020, Corey Plante, for Inverse, wrote: "All things considered, Tasha’s Cauldron of Everything already feels like a must-buy as the most important D&D book of 2020 that players will be reference for many years to come". Scott Baird, for Screen Rant, highlighted the slow release schedule of 5th edition Dungeons & Dragons and that "Tasha's Cauldron of Everything might offer some of the biggest additions to the game since it was first launched".

Multiple critics highlighted the anticipation of new racial rules after Wizards of the Coast's announcement in June 2020 that the company would make substantive changes to character creation. Jeffrey Parkin, for Polygon, wrote: "The most important and intriguing announcement about Tasha’s Cauldron is a new and extensive set of rules for character creation. [...] With these rules, your character’s race will no longer be tied to inherent stat boosts and abilities. While the character creation rules are still available in 2014’s Player’s Handbook for anyone who wants to use them, Tasha’s will decouple race and origin from their 5th edition mechanics". Jon Ryan, for IGN, wrote: "The most noteworthy item is probably the new 'lineage' options, which allow players to adjust the features and ability modifiers traditionally associated with a character's race or species. [...] This notion of divesting a character's stats from their species has long been a topic of discussion among the D&D fanbase, and whether via discussions in forums or on social media, or feedback on previous Unearthed Arcana, it seems that much of the content in TCoE is a direct result of that type of player feedback". James Whitbrook, for Io9, highlighted that this book includes the highest levels of character customization seen in 5th Edition so far with the new rules that would allow players to discard previously "mandated traits and benefits" and "abilities and ideals [...] explicitly linked to racial stereotypes". Whitbrook also highlighted that this book is the first step to address race and inclusivity within the game and commented that "for Crawford, it’s not just about addressing previously longheld bias and privileges in races of the game—such as the negative stereotypes against Orcs and the aforementioned Drow, dark-skinned fantasy races that have been interpreted as the game’s take on minority characters in the past—but also giving players the freedom to pick whatever race they want while creating a character that doesn’t feel like a specific exemplar of that race".

=== Critical reception ===
In Publishers Weekly's "Best-selling Books Week Ending November 21, 2020", Tasha's Cauldron of Everything was #2 in "Hardcover Nonfiction". In the following weeks, it slipped to #8 and then to #22. Per Publishers Weekly, 105,022 units were sold in November 2020. In USA Today's "Best-Selling Books List" for the week of November 26, 2020, Tasha's Cauldron of Everything was #5 out of 150. In the following weeks, it slipped to #27 and then to #117.

Charlie Hall, for Polygon, wrote that the book "is a great resource for everyone at the table, it's just not as dense and full-featured as the supplements that have come before" and there is "a decent bit of material that's been reprinted". Hall highlighted an earlier vow by Wizards of the Coast where the company stated they would make structural improvements to the game's mechanics in relation to race. Hall criticized these improvements in Tasha's Cauldron of Everything as "extremely weak" and wrote, "My only real disappointment with the book is the way in which it handles optional rules for dealing with the concept of race. [...] The guidance is, more or less, to ignore the rules for character creation and just do what feels right. That's good advice for every player and every DM regardless of the situation, but it falls well short of establishing a progressive new precedent for the original role-playing game".

Liam Nolan, for CBR, wrote, "one of the biggest controversies surrounding Dungeons & Dragons has been the game's prescriptivist approach to race and the way it embraces problematic stereotypes. [...] However, customizing one's origins isn't just a matter of moving around ability scores. Players can also customize their languages and proficiencies. [...] While customized origins do not undo any of the damage that's been done, they do provide a path forward for making Dungeons & Dragons more accessible and less problematic".

Corey Plante, for Inverse, also highlighted the flexibility of the game options in Tasha's Cauldron of Everything. Plante wrote, "Rather than reinforce rigid traditions, rules, and definitions that've been in the game for up to 46 years, it shatters boundaries, expanding the game in profound, progressive ways—for better or for worse. [...] To an extent, this kind of flexibility could jeopardize the core identity of the game's races and classes. Orcs, Tiefling, and Drow are archetypically evil races, and their archaic positions within the game reflect and reinforce racist stereotypes in the real world. [...] Traditionalists might frown upon these rules if their loyalties lie with previous editions and their more rigid game structures. But a major factor in D&D's exploding popularity over the last several years has to do with the 5th edition [...]. These kinds of creative innovations aimed at diversity and inclusion might alienate the game's traditionalists, but it's totally awesome to imagine what players might concoct".

Christian Hoffer, for ComicBook, wrote "one criticism that you'll likely see about Tasha's Cauldron of Everything is that it contains a lot of rules previously seen in past products" and that "for the hardcore D&D enthusiast, Tasha's Cauldron of Everything may not spark the same level of excitement as other recent releases. [...] For the casual gamer who doesn't follow the minutiae of D&D news, this expansion will provide a lot of freshness to their next campaign, bringing countless more options for building a character. Tasha's Cauldron of Everything is a good rules supplement, one that opts to build upon existing rules rather than try to come up with new rules systems, but fits perfectly into the Fifth Edition design ethos". Hoffer also highlighted the upfront placement of character creation rules in the first chapter which will indicate to players "that Dungeons & Dragons is considering to move away from the game's rather problematic depiction of race".
