= Beholder (Dungeons & Dragons) =

Fictional monster in Dungeons & Dragons

- Tom Wham's illustration of a beholder from the Advanced Dungeons & Dragons Monster Manual, 1977
- First appearance: Greyhawk (1975)

In-universe information
- Type: Aberration
- Alignment: Lawful Evil

The beholder is a fictional monster in the Dungeons & Dragons fantasy role-playing game. It is depicted as a floating orb of flesh with a large mouth, single central eye, and many smaller eyestalks on top with powerful magical abilities.

The beholder is among the Dungeons & Dragons monsters that have appeared in every edition of the game since 1975. Beholders are one of the few classic Dungeons & Dragons monsters that Wizards of the Coast claims as Product Identity and as such was not released under its Open Game License. Beholders have been used on the cover of different Dungeons & Dragons handbooks, including the fifth edition Monster Manual.

== Publication history ==
Unlike many other Dungeons & Dragons monsters, the beholder is an original creation for D&D, as it is not based on a creature from mythology or other fiction. Rob Kuntz's brother Terry Kuntz created the Beholder, and Gary Gygax detailed it for publication.

=== Dungeons & Dragons (1974–1976) ===
The beholder was introduced with the first Dungeons & Dragons supplement, Greyhawk (1975), and is depicted on its cover (as shown in the section below). It is described as a "Sphere of Many Eyes" or "Eye Tyrant", a levitating globe with ten magical eye stalks. The beholder later appears in the Companion Rules set, in the Dungeon Masters Companion: Book Two (1984). In 1991, it appeared in the Dungeons & Dragons Rules Cyclopedia.

=== Advanced Dungeons & Dragons 1st edition (1977–1988) ===
With the release of Advanced Dungeons & Dragons 1st edition, the beholder appeared in the first edition Monster Manual (1977), where it is described as a hateful, aggressive, avaricious spherical monster that is most frequently found underground. Ed Greenwood and Roger E. Moore authored "The Ecology of the Beholder", which featured in Dragon #76 (August 1983).

=== Advanced Dungeons & Dragons 2nd edition (1989–1999) ===
Second edition supplements to Advanced Dungeons & Dragons, especially those of the Spelljammer campaign setting, added further details about these classic creatures' societies and culture. Beholders feature prominently in the Spelljammer setting, and a number of variants and related creatures are introduced in the Spelljammer: AD&D Adventures in Space campaign set, in the Lorebook of the Void booklet (1989). It also appeared in the Monstrous Compendium Volume One (1989), and is reprinted in the Monstrous Manual (1993). The beholder was featured on an AD&D Trading Card (1991). The book I, Tyrant (1996), and the Monstrous Arcana module series that accompanies it, develops the beholder further. I, Tyrant is a supplement focused on beholders, and builds on the known information about beholders by expanding on elements such as their history, religion, culture, habitations and behavior.

Based on Tom Wham's depiction in the first edition Monster Manual, TSR artist Keith Parkinson characterized its popular appearance with plate-like armored scales and arthropod-like eyestalks. Jeff Grubb cites Keith Parkinson's artwork as the inspiration for the beholder-kin created for the Spelljammer campaign setting. The Beholder's xenophobia towards other subraces of Beholders was added after Jim Holloway submitted multiple designs for the Beholder's spelljamming ship and Jeff Grubb decided to keep them all and used xenophobia to explain the differences in design style.

=== Dungeons & Dragons 3.0 edition (2000–2002) ===
The third edition of Dungeons & Dragons included the Beholder in the Monster Manual (2000) with the expanded monster statistics of this release. Beholder variants appear in Monstrous Compendium: Monsters of Faerûn (2001). Epic Level Handbook (2002) introduces the Gibbering Orb, a purported common ancestor of the beholder and gibbering mouther.

=== Dungeons & Dragons 3.5 edition (2003–2007) ===
The beholder appears in the revised Monster Manual for the 3.5 edition (2003). The mindwitness was a sample creature of the half-illithid template using a beholder as the base creature, featured on Wizards of the Coast's website on August 14, 2003. The beholder receives its own chapter in the book Lords of Madness: The Book of Aberrations (2005).

=== Dungeons & Dragons 4th edition (2008–2014) ===
With the release of the fourth edition of Dungeons & Dragons, the beholder once again appears in the Monster Manual for this edition (2008), including the beholder eye of flame and the beholder eye tyrant. Variants of the beholder also appear in Monster Manual 2 (2009), and Monster Manual 3 (2010).

=== Dungeons & Dragons 5th edition (2014–present) ===
The beholder appears along with the more powerful undead death tyrant and the spectator in the 5th edition Monster Manual (2014). Additionally, a zombie beholder also appears under the "Zombies" section later in the book. Volo's Guide to Monsters (2016) provides more detail on beholder culture and contains stats for the death kiss, gauth and gazer beholder-kin. The half-illithid mindwitness also makes an appearance in this book. The book Xanathar's Guide to Everything (2017) contains various notes written from the perspective of the beholder known as Xanathar. Xanathar is also one of the possible villains adventurers can face in the adventure module Waterdeep: Dragon Heist (2018).

== Description ==
The original Greyhawk booklet cover, featuring one of the earliest depictions of a beholder

A beholder is an aberration comprising a floating spheroid body with a large fanged mouth and single eye on the front and many flexible eyestalks on the top. It is protected by chitinous plates.

Each eye of a beholder possesses a different magical ability; the main eye projects an anti-magical cone, and the other eyes have different spell-like abilities (disintegrate objects, transmute flesh to stone, cause sleep, slow the motion of objects or beings, charm animals, charm humans, cause death, induce fear, levitate objects, and inflict serious wounds). Many variant beholder species exist, such as "observers", "spectators", "eyes of the deep", "elder orbs", "hive mothers", and "death tyrants". In addition, some rare beholders can use their eyes for non-standard spell-like abilities; these mutant beholders are often killed or exiled by their peers. Beholders wishing to cast spells like ordinary wizards relinquish the traditional use of their eyestalks, and put out their central anti-magic eye, making these beholder mages immediate outcasts.

In 4th edition, different breeds of beholders have different magic abilities. Beholder Eyes of Flame only have Fear, Fire, and Telekinesis Rays; Eyes of Frost are the same, with fire replaced by frost. The Beholder Eye Tyrant is mostly unchanged from traditional beholders, but the Death Ray causes ongoing necrotic damage rather than an instant kill, and the Disintegration Ray does not automatically kill its target. Other beholder types each have their own set of abilities. In this edition, the beholder's central eye no longer cancels out magic, instead dazing or giving some vulnerability to its victim.

=== Society ===
Beholders are extremely xenophobic. They will sometimes take members of other, non-beholder races as slaves; however, they will engage in a violent intra-species war with others of their kind who differ even slightly in appearance. This intense hatred of other beholders is not universal; the most prominent exceptions are Hive Mothers, who use their powers of mind control to form hives with other beholders and beholder-kin. Beholder communities in the Underdark often, when provoked, wage war on any and all nearby settlements, finding the most resistance from the drow and illithids.

Beholders worship their insane, controlling goddess known as the Great Mother, though some also, or instead, follow her rebel offspring, Gzemnid, the beholder god of gases.

Some beholder strains have mutated far from the basic beholder stock. These are aberrant beholders, of which there are numerous different types. These aberrants may have differing abilities and/or appearances but the unifying feature among beholders and the various aberrant beholders seems to be a simple, fleshy body with one or more grotesque eyes.

== Campaign settings ==
=== Forgotten Realms ===
Beholders are especially prominent in the Forgotten Realms campaign setting, where they infiltrate and seek to control many sectors of society—many beholders are allied to the Zhentarim and some work with the Red Wizards of Thay. Beholders also compete to control the Underdark from where most of them originate, with their base of power in the City of the Eye Tyrants, Ootul.

A beholder known as "The Xanathar" controls Skullport's influential Thieves Guild; "The Xanathar" is the title of the thieves guild leader, passed from one to the next. The book Dungeons & Dragons Lore & Legends (2023) highlighted that Xanathar dates "back to the very origins of the Forgotten Realms, detailed first in module FR1: Waterdeep and the North" (1987) and noted that the character has made appearances outside the tabletop game "in comic books, and even in the 1991 SSI game Eye of the Beholder".

=== Spelljammer ===
According to Ken Rolston, the beholder and the mind flayer "win starring roles as intergalactic menaces" in Spelljammer, and notes that the beholders, "with their abundant magical powers, are perhaps the most formidable warrior race of the universe, but fortunately they are too busy slaughtering one another to present a big threat to other spacefaring races".

Beholders in the Spelljammer campaign are common antagonists, like the deadly neogi and sadistic illithids. However, one thing prevents them from being the most dangerous faction in wildspace: the beholders are engaged in a xenophobic civil war of genetic purity.

There are a large number of variations in the beholder race with some sub-races having smooth hides and others chitinous plates. Other noticeable differences include snakelike eyestalks or crustacean like eyestalk joints. Some variations seem minor such as variations in the size of the central eye or differences in skin colour. Each beholder nation believes itself to be the true beholder race and sees other beholders as ugly copies that must be destroyed.

Lone beholders in wildspace are often refugees who have survived an attack that exterminated the rest of their nest or are outcasts who were expelled for having some form of mutation. The most famous lone beholder is Large Luigi, who works as a barkeeper on the Rock of Bral.

Beholders use a large number of different ship designs. Some of these ships feature a piercing ram but others have no weaponry. All beholder ships allow a circuit of beholders to focus their eye stalks into a 400-yard beam of magical energy. These ships are powered and navigated by the "orbus" (plural "orbii") race of beholders, who are stunted, albino, and very weak in combat.

=== Eberron ===
In the Eberron campaign setting, beholders served as living artillery during the Daelkyr incursion, using the terrible power of their eyes to shatter whole goblin armies. Beholders do not reproduce naturally and have not created a culture of their own—they are simply the immortal servants of the daelkyr. Most continue to serve their masters, commanding subterranean outposts of aberrations or serving as the hidden leaders of various Cults of the Dragon Below. Others lead solitary lives, contemplating mysteries or studying the world. Such lone beholders may manipulate humanoid communities, but their actions are rarely driven by a desire for personal power.

Members of the Cults of the Dragon Below believe that these creatures function as the eyes of a greater power. Some insist that they serve Belashyrra, a powerful Daelkyr who is also known as the Lord of Eyes. Others claim the beholders are the eyes of Xoriat itself—that while they serve the daelkyr, they are conduits to a power even greater and more terrible than the shapers of flesh.

== Variants and kin ==
Information about beholder variations and related creatures has been made available in Dungeons & Dragons publications.

Name	Description
Eye Tyrant	Standard beholder with 10 eyestalks with Charm Monster, Charm Person, Death, Disintegration, Flesh to Stone, Cause Grievous Wounds, Telekinesis, Sleep, Slow, and Fear and its central eye produces anti-magic cone.
Elder Orb	A rare stronger and bigger variant of the traditional beholder born once out of every several hundred regular Beholders; it is around 15 feet in diameter. These creatures have a very long lifespan and are more powerful than traditional beholders. Elder Orbs are skilled at arcane magic, though not to the extent of Beholder Mages (unless they become one).
Hive Mother	These are even rarer than elder orbs. Hive Mothers, also known as Ultimate Eye Tyrants, are not female but are gender-neutral like other beholders. Their name stems from the fact that they have the ability to magically dominate other beholders. Hive Mothers have no eyestalks, but their magical eyes are protected by hooded covers in the flesh of the creature's body, so that they cannot be severed. The central eye has 15 hit points. Hive Mothers' eyes can use Charm Monster, Charm Person, Disintegrate, Sleep, Fear, Finger of Death, Flesh to Stone, Slow, Telekinesis and Inflict Critical Wounds.
Orbus	The orbus is either a genetically bred or a stunted and immature form of the standard beholder. It is only found in space aboard the tyrant ships in Spelljammer campaign.
Observer	An observer has a spherical body about 6 to 7 feet in diameter, covered with a tough, chitinous shell. The shell's a mottled purple and pinkish color, and can be 2 to 3 inches thick in places. Unlike beholders, observers have three mouths spaced evenly around their lower hemisphere, and three main eyes spaced evenly around their equator. Six minor eyes on stalks ring their dorsal surfaces. Observers support their bodies by means of an innate levitation ability. The observer's mouths actually consist of powerful, retractable stalks that can reach things up to 5 feet from the main body. Each of the creature's main eyes projects a ray of telekinetic force. The powerful eyes of observers are the equivalent of a true seeing spell, except that the monster can't determine alignment by sight. This means they can't be deceived by illusions or invisibility. Observers are also powerful psionicists, in possession of potent telepathic and psychokinetic abilities. An observer usually relies on its magical abilities first, but should those fail or a subtler means of attack be required, it'll fall back on mental attacks. Observers enjoy experimenting with telepathic attacks against nonpsionic creatures and take a fiendish pleasure in permanently wrecking a foolish opponent's psyche.
Examiner	Examiners are scholars and clerks involved in spell and magical item enhancement, research, and creation. They can use any artifact or tool as well as humans, and they can wield up to four items at a time. An examiner is a beholder-kin that is a 4-foot-diameter sphere with no central eye and only four small eyes, each at the end of an antenna, mounted atop the sphere. They have one small, lamprey-like mouth on their ventral surface. The mouth is surrounded by four multi-jointed limbs ending in gripper pads. An examiner's true strength lies in their talent with manipulating objects both mundane and magical, and their ability to wield magical items. Most examiners maintain a collection of magical wands which they use when needed in combat, although they prefer flight whenever possible, working to maintain the arsenal of the beholder hive. Examiner has 4 eyestalks with Enlarge or Reduce, Identify or Legend Lore, Transmute Form (similar to a Stone Shape spell, but works on all types of nonmagical, nonliving material) and Spell Reflection as a ring of spell turning.
Lensman	A lensman has one eye set in the chest of its five-limbed, starfish-shaped, simian body. Beneath the eye is a leering, toothy maw. Four of the five limbs end in three-fingered, two-thumbed, clawed hands. The fifth limb, atop the body, is a prehensile, whip-like tentacle. Its chitin is soft and there are many short, fly-like hairs. Lensmen are the only kin to wear any sort of garb—a webbing that is used to hold tools and weapons. Their preferred weapons are double-headed pole arms. Their role in beholder society is that of menial labor, and they are treated as semi-mindless drones. Few lensmen ever strive above this lot, and advanced lensmen are rare. Similar to a beholder a lensman's eye has power. They are able to fire off an eye ray from their single eye. Their eye can have one of the six following powers (although some come in pairs of effects): Remove Fear, Scare, and Rage, Cure Moderate Wounds, Dispel Magic, Tongues, Minor Image, Resist Energy.
Watcher	Cowardly creatures by nature, watchers are semi-sentient beholder-kin. They are used as scouts and, as their name suggests, watchers by their more intelligent kin. A watcher appears as a 6-foot-diameter sphere with three central eyes. On the ventral side of the orb is a long, barbed tentacle, which extends from just behind the watcher's mouth, and on the dorsal side is a ring of six eye spots and a compound eye. Watchers are 6-foot-diameter spheres with three central eyes arranged around the circumference of the sphere. These eyes are huge and unlidded. On the crown of the sphere is a compound eye and a ring of six eye spots that make it difficult to surprise a watcher. A large tentacle with a barbed prehensile pad extends from the ventral surface, right behind the small mouth with its rasp-like tongue. Watchers feed on carrion and stunned prey. They are information gatherers and are the least brave of all the eye tyrant races. Each of a watcher's main eyes has two powers, and the compound eye on top may draw on three different abilities. The six eye spots have no special powers. Main eyes: True Seeing and ESP, Advanced Illusion and Demi-Shadow Magic, Telekinesis 1,000 lb and Teleport. Compound Eye: Message, Tongues, and Suggestion.
Astereater	A giant Beholder-kin from Spelljammer campaign living in outer space. The astereater has none of the intelligence or magical abilities of the beholders. In appearance, the astereater resembles a large round boulder with a one large central eye and large mouth filled with pointed teeth. The skin of the creature is virtually identical in appearance and consistency to rock. Astereaters speak the language of beholders and the common tongue.
Death Tyrant	A Death Tyrant is an undead beholder that has retained some magical ability. These creatures are used by powerful wizards as guardians; they are almost never encountered near other beholders, who find them abhorrent.
Death Kiss	This creature's eyestalks are replaced with blood-draining tentacles, and its body roils with a powerful electric aura. The Death Kiss, or "bleeder", is a fearsome predator found in caverns or ruins. Its spherical body resembles that of the dreaded beholder, but the "eyestalks" of this creature are bloodsucking tentacles, its "eyes" are hook-toothed orifices. They favor a diet of humans and horses, but will attack anything that has blood. An older name for these creatures is eye of terror. The central body of a death kiss has no mouth. Its central eye gives it 120-foot infravision, but the death kiss has no magical powers. A death kiss is 90% likely to be taken for a beholder when sighted. The 10 tentacles largely retract into the body when not needed, resembling eyestalks, but can lash out to a full 20-foot stretch with blinding speed.
Kasharin	An undead beholder that can pass on a rotting disease which killed it.
Ghost Beholder	Dead Eye Tyrant who came back as a ghost.
Doomsphere	Ghost-like undead beholder is created by magical explosions.
Director	Directors resemble beholders, but their central eye is smaller. They possess only six small eyes on retractable eye stalks these eyes have Magic Missile, Burning Hands, Wall of Ice, Slow, Enervation, Improved Phantasmal Force. A director's central eye has the power of deflection. Directors have a fanged mouth below the central eye and possesses three clawed, sensory tendrils on their ventral surface. These tendrils are used to cling to the mount and link with its limited mind. A director is often found dwelling in a beholder community led by a hive mother or an overseer. A director uses three clawed tentacles to bond with monstrous vermin mounts. Directors are a social, warrior-beholder, and breed specialized mounts. They mindlink with their mounts to better control them.
Eye of The Deep	An eye of the deep rarely comes into conflict with true beholders, for this aquatic variant dwells deep underwater. It has only two eyestalks (Disintegrate and Death), but its massive pinchers make it a dangerous combatant.
Eye of Shadow	Beholders who spent too long in the Shadowfell. It has eye rays that blind, do thunder damage, and immobilize. It can also teleport and become invisible.
Eye of Flame	These beholders serve more powerful beholders. They have fire rays, telekinesis rays and fear rays. When they die they explode in a fire burst.
Eye of Frost	A cruel beholder who lives in solitude.
Eyeball	An eyeball is a Tiny beholder-kin with four eyestalks; they are popular familiars in some wizardly and sorcerous circles. They only have 4 eyestalks (charm person, Charm Monsters, Sleep, and telekinesis). In 5th edition, eyeballs are called gazers. They appear when beholders sleep.
Beholder Spawn	These are 4th edition minions. They fire a single eye ray.
Gauth	A gauth is a beholder-kin that feeds on magic as well as flesh. A gauth has six eyestalks with Disintegrate, Telekinesis, Death, Drain Magic, Polymorph and Flesh to Stone (one of which is used to drain magic from items) and four feeding tendrils. The most obvious feature of a gauth is that its central eye (which affects the viewer's mind) is surrounded by a ridge of flesh and many small eyes used for sight.
Gouger	A gouger's ten eyestalks are magically useless. Its central eye retains the antimagic properties of true beholders, and four small legs hang from the creature's underside. A gouger's most hideous feature, though, is its long, barbed tongue, which is adept at temporarily neutralizing beholder eyestalks.
Gorbel	Gorbel is a wild, clawed beholder-kin lacking magic but with the nasty habit of exploding if attacked.
Overseer	An overseer is the most dangerous of the known beholder-kin. Rivaling the power of a hive mother, an overseer resembles nothing so much as a large, fleshy tree with mouths on its trunk and eyes on its branches. They have 13 limbs, each of which ends in a bud that conceals an eye; one of these limbs forms the top spine, and three yammering mouths surround the spine. There are eight thorny, vine-like limbs that are used to grasp tools and for physical defense. Overseers sit on root-like bases and can inch along when movement is required. They cannot levitate. Overseers are very protective of their health and always have one or two beholder guards and at least a half dozen directors protecting their welfare. Overseers are covered with a fungus which changes color as the overseers desire, commonly mottled green, gray, and brown. The powers of their 13 eyes are as follows: (all magical effects are cast at 14th level) Cone of Cold, Dispel Magic, Paralysis, Chain Lightning, Telekinesis 250 lb weight, Emotion, Mass Charm, Domination, Mass Suggestion, Major Creation, Spell Turning, Serten's Spell Immunity, Temporal Stasis.
Spectator	A spectator is an extraplanar beholder-kin with four eyestalks (fatigue, inflict moderate wounds, hold monster, and suggestion), their central eye can act as spell turning and reflect spells back at the caster. Somewhat mild and even-tempered, spectators have even been known to form friendships with other creatures, a trait that no other beholder-kin or true beholder ever displays. They are smaller in size usually around 6 to 7 feet in diameter.
Beholder Mage	Through ritual destruction of its central eye, a beholder can learn to channel and use magic much more quickly and efficiently than can almost any other race. Only true beholders can become Beholder Mages.
Mindwitness	Mindwitness is a beholder who is part-mind flayer. Mindwitnesses are created when a beholder is stunned and placed in a brine pool.
Aniatha	Commonly known as "gas spores"; a balloon-like fungoid creature which closely resembles a beholder, exploding into a cloud of parasitic spores if slain. Sometimes suggested to be an artificial creature designed in the beholder's image, or mimicking a beholder to scare off predators, though more likely to be the product of a fungus that mutated after infesting beholder corpses. Aniatha that infest beholders can absorb some of the memories of the corpse, and transfer them to other creatures through their spores.
Gibbering Orb	An epic-level creature suggested to be a primordial ancestor of both the beholder and the gibbering mouther (an amorphous shoggoth-like creature covered in eyes and mouths), having traits of both monsters but at vastly increased power. While it lacks an antimagic eye, it inherits the mouther's amorphous biology, madness-inducing voice, and Swallow Whole attack. It has 24 different eye rays at caster level 27th (cone of cold, disintegrate, dominate monster, energy drain, feeblemind, finger of death, flesh to stone, greater dispel magic, harm, hold monster, horrid wilting, implosion, inflict critical wounds, lightning bolt, magic missile, Mordenkainen's disjunction, Otto's irresistible dance, baleful polymorph, power word blind, power word kill, power word stun, prismatic spray, slay living, and temporal stasis), supplemented by its ability to temporarily gain the powers of spellcasters it consumes.

== Reception ==
A reviewer for Arcane magazine described the beholder: "11 eyes, paranoid, xenophobic, having a taste for live animals and being deadly with magic."

Artist Chris Hagerty called the beholder a "creature that looks at you and is destroying you by the power of its magical eyes".

Wizard magazine's top 100 greatest villains ever list selected the beholder as the 99th-greatest villain. Rob Bricken from io9 named the beholder as the most memorable D&D monster.

SyFy Wire in 2018 called it one of "The 9 Scariest, Most Unforgettable Monsters From Dungeons & Dragons", saying that "Beholders are an iconic Dungeons & Dragons monster and one you don't want to come face to eyestalk with if you can help it."

The beholder (gauth) was ranked sixth among the ten best mid-level monsters by the authors of Dungeons & Dragons For Dummies. The authors described the true beholder as an iconic creature of the game, "What could be more fantastic than a giant floating eyeball with little eye stalks sticking out, all of which shoot magic rays?" Of the gauth, the authors say "its ability to inflict a bewildering variety of damage on a party of heroes is unparalleled... until they fight a true beholder, that is."

The Envoyer magazine called the beholder a terrible beast, properly shown as such in the 3rd edition Monster Manual, in contrast to earlier depictions where it rather looked like "a cuddly rosy ball with too many eyes".

Richard W. Forest commented in "The Ashgate Encyclopedia of Literary and Cinematic Monsters" that the beholder was designed to counter magic-using characters while being a formidable opponent for a whole party due to its versatility.

The beholder was considered one of the "game's signature monsters" by Philip J. Clements, while Backstab reviewer Philippe Tessier called it a "classic of D&D".

Witwer et al. considered the beholder "iconic", "the brand's signature beast" and "one of the most feared and fearsome monsters of the game".

== Appearances in other media ==
Beholders have appeared in many D&D-related or licensed products including :

- Two beholders are seen briefly in the 2000 motion picture Dungeons & Dragons.
- The Dungeons & Dragons TV cartoon series featured a beholder in the 1983 episode Eye of the Beholder.
- A beholder also appears in the interactive movie Scourge of Worlds: A Dungeons & Dragons Adventure.
- Dungeons & Dragons licensed computer and video games, including the Capcom arcade Tower of Doom, the Eye of the Beholder series, Baldur's Gate 2, and one named Xantam in Baldur's Gate: Dark Alliance.
- The beholder Xanathar appears in Dungeons & Dragons: Secrets of Waterdeep, a 2025 theme park attraction at Universal Studios Hollywood. It is a life-sized puppet created by the Jim Henson's Creature Shop and is operated by a live puppeteer. Lin Codega of Rascal highlighted that the Xanathar puppet is "bright and fearsome and delightful" and "even Sylgar, the current Xanathar's pet goldfish, is included in the rendering". Sabina Graves of Io9 explained that Xanathar "sits on a pile of gold and it's a towering behemoth—think Audrey II's final form in Little Shop of Horrors or for Horror Nights Fans, the Alien Queen from the Alien vs. Predator house".

=== D&D Miniatures ===
- A beholder is featured in D&D Miniatures: Deathknell set #32 (2005).
- The Beholder Eye Tyrant was included as a random packed figure in D&D Miniatures: Dangerous Delves (#5/40) (2009).
- The Beholder Ultimate Tyrant was available as a visible piece Legendary Evils set (#6/40) (2009).

=== Media unrelated to Dungeons & Dragons ===
- The movie Big Trouble in Little China (1986) features a Beholder-like monster whose main job is spying the protagonists.
- Beholders appeared as a boss and recurring monster in the original Japanese version of Final Fantasy, but was renamed to "Evil Eye" and redesigned for the game's North American release to avoid copyright issues with TSR. Current installments of the Final Fantasy series have continued to use the monster with the design and name heavily altered.
- Beholders appear as a recruitable unit in the 1999 video game Heroes of Might and Magic III. Once upgraded, these units are renamed to "Evil Eyes".
- The Futurama episode "How Hermes Requisitioned His Groove Back" features a beholder who guards the Central Bureaucracy. He is a Grade 11 bureaucrat who begs the Planet Express crew not to tell its supervisor that he was sleeping on the job. He has another cameo in "Lethal Inspection", still working at the Central Bureaucracy.
- A parody of the Beholder, named "The Beholster", appears as a boss in Enter the Gungeon, an indie game that includes numerous other references to Dungeons & Dragons.
- The Goblin Slayer series features a "Giant Eyeball" (episode 8 of the anime and volume 5 of the manga), which closely resembles a beholder with disintegration and magic dispelling abilities.
- A beholder appears in the 2020 Pixar Animation Studios film Onward. The film's credits include a thanks to Wizards of the Coast for allowing them to use the beholder and the gelatinous cube.
- In the MMORPG Tibia, the monsters now known as "Bonelords" and "Elder Bonelords" used to be named, respectively, "Beholders" and "Elder Beholders", from their insertion in the game on May 20, 1998, until a small patch released on August 23, 2010. In a newspost on the official Tibia website, Cipsoft GmbH announced the change to have happened, in lore, due to interference by "wizards of the coast of a remote kingdom full of dungeons and dragons" that "suddenly appeared on the Tibian shores".
