= Xanathar's Guide to Everything =

Tabletop role-playing game supplement

- Cover
- Authors: Jeremy Crawford, Mike Mearls, Robert J. Schwalb, Adam Lee, Christopher Perkins, Matt Sernett
- Genre: Role-playing games
- Publisher: Wizards of the Coast
- Publication date: 15 November 2017
- Media type: Print (hardcover)
- Pages: 192
- ISBN: 978-0-7869-6612-7

Xanathar's Guide to Everything is a sourcebook published in 2017 for the 5th edition of the Dungeons & Dragons fantasy role-playing game. It acts as a supplement to the 5th edition Dungeon Master's Guide and the Player's Handbook.

== Contents ==
The book adds a variety of options for both players and Dungeon Masters along with marginalia by the Xanathar of Waterdeep.

- Chapter 1: Character Options
  - Includes 31 new subclasses, 2 or 3 for each of the twelve character classes.
  - A variety of character background ideas such as origins and life events.
  - New racial feats.
- Chapter 2: Dungeon Master's Tools
  - Revisits and expands on traps and downtime activities rules.
  - In-depth coverage of tool proficiencies and spellcasting.
  - A new magic items sections expands the DMG and adds new minor items.
  - Includes a variety of other DM tools such as random encounters and simultaneous effects.
- Chapter 3: Spells
- Appendix A: Shared Campaigns
- Appendix B: Character names
  - Includes nonhuman names as well as real-world and real-world inspired human names.

== Publication history ==
Much of the information in Xanathar's Guide to Everything was developed through the public "Unearthed Arcana" playtest and several character subclasses were previously published in the Sword Coast Adventurer's Guide. During the Extra Life 2017 fundraiser in November 2017, free excerpts from Xanathar's Guide to Everything were released as PDFs when different reward tiers were hit. The book was released on November 21, 2017. An exclusive edition with an alternate art cover by Hydro74 was pre-released to select game shops early in November 2017.

Dungeons & Dragons Rules Expansion Gift Set, a boxed set, contains Mordenkainen Presents: Monsters of the Multiverse (2022) along with new printings of Xanathar's Guide to Everything and Tasha's Cauldron of Everything (2020); it was released on January 25, 2022. An exclusive edition, with white foil alternate art covers by Joy Ang, is only available through local game stores.

== Reception ==
Xanathar's Guide to Everything won the 2017 Origins Awards for Best Role-Playing Game Supplement and Fan Favorite Role-Playing Game Supplement.

In Publishers Weekly's "Best-selling Books Week Ending December 4, 2017", Xanathar's Guide to Everything was #1 in "Hardcover Nonfiction". Publishers Weekly highlighted that the book "sold nearly 45,000 copies" as a new release. ICv2 underscored that these numbers originate from BookScan and include point of sale "data from most chains and online retailers, but not most [Friendly Local Game Stores]". Scott Thorne, for ICv2, highlighted two interconnected reasons for the high sale numbers: first, "WotC has a huge untapped market out there for D&D player-targeted books and Xanathar's Guide is the first 'official' [...] player-oriented book released by WotC in almost two years. With that level of pent-up demand, it is no surprise that sales of the book took most stores, and WotC, by surprise". And second, Amazon sale discounts since "unlike some other gaming manufacturers, which have started protecting the value and price of their books though a MAP, a customer can, when it comes back into stock, order Xanathar's Guide from Amazon for $29.95, a 40% discount. One Amazon seller even has the book, as of this writing, listed at $19.30 with shipping, a whopping 61% off".

In Polygon's review, Charlie Hall wrote "like Volo's Guide to Monsters, which was released late last year, Xanathar's has a narrator named Xanathar. He's a beholder — a multi-eyed, floating monster from D&D lore — who just happens to be a powerful crime lord in the city of Waterdeep. Think Jabba the Hutt, but with disintegration rays shooting out of its eyestalks. Nearly every page of the book is annotated with little quips and observations. Unfortunately, the humor of those narrative snippets fell flat for me. Xanathar's voice, as applied in this book, feels a bit too modern. He sounds more like a cranky Redditor than a fantastical crime boss. Luckily, the bulk of the content in the book is outstanding. In my estimation, it's the first must-have new book from Wizards of the Coast since the latest edition of the Dungeon Master's Guide. [...] Up front, there are more than 30 new subclasses for players to choose from. They include some vital and popular builds from previous editions of the game, like the Cavalier and the Samurai. But they also include some brand new versions of classic character classes that will liven any newly-formed party. [...] Best of all, WotC has instilled all of these new subclasses with strong role-playing hooks. These aren't just stat-blocks with new art, but rather inspirations for storytelling in and of themselves. That being said, most players will have no need for the remainder of the book. Chapters two and three are mostly for Dungeon Masters, and include a host of new tools and tables".

Rob Wieland, for Geek & Sundry, wrote that "backgrounds in Fifth Edition offer a good place to start talking about the history of characters, but coming up with a full background for a character can be a little intimidating for someone that's never done it before. Xanathar's Guide has a few class-specific elements that can help like tables for a bard's worst performance or the vice a rogue likes to indulge in, in between adventures. It also has a big section full of tables that determine important character details like siblings, upbringing and other points that can help sketch a character backstory during play. There's a running gag that all D&D characters are orphans that were born, grew up and became adventurers, but with this section, characters get a skeleton of a backstory to help shade how they react in play".

Richard Jansen-Parkes, for the UK print magazine Tabletop Gaming, wrote that "in many ways the slightly unfocused air of XGtE is a reflection of how modern games – both tabletop and digital – are no longer static products, eternally fixed at version 1.0. It was clearly shaped by community feedback and directly addresses many of the questions and concerns that regularly crop up in Reddit threads and Twitter feeds. [...] In many ways, the fact that the new rules feel fun without seeming over-powered is perhaps the book's biggest success of all. [...] There are a few things that appeal to the power gamers out there, but this is always going to be the case and none of them seem to make any existing abilities or characters completely obsolete. Indeed, plenty of the content doesn't have any impact on the gameplay whatsoever, such as a guide for generating character backstories or long tables of random names for the DM to consult when players insist on speaking to everyone in the tavern. The best way to describe XGtE, perhaps, is that it upgrades your experience to D&D 5.1. It's a huge content update that tweaks things here and there, presented with all the usual top-notch design and writing work we've come to expect from the D&D team. Arguably some of the rules clarifications should be presented as errata or an update to the existing core books rather than requiring you to buy a new one, but when that's the biggest complaint going you know you have a success on your hands".

Rollin Bishop, for Comicbook, wrote that "though the supplement's name does it no favors, it's mostly a reprinted collection of an online article series with some added depth. Having it all in one physical place, however, is helpful. Even so, the game of D&D technically only requires three books: the Player's Handbook, the Dungeon Master's Guide, and the Monster Manual. But if there's a fourth book every tabletop group should pick up, it's probably Xanathar's. In terms of usefulness, Xanathar's is arguably equally useful to both players and Dungeon Masters. The first and third chapter are heavily player focused while the middle chapter is specifically all about tools for the DM to use. That includes sections on sleep, random encounters, traps, and more. If you're familiar with the Unearthed Arcana books from previous modern editions, this treads similar territory for 5th Edition. The question most groups will likely be asking themselves is whether the $49.95 MSRP is worth the sticker price".

In a review of Xanathar's Guide to Everything in Black Gate, Howard Andrew Jones said "It's a great 5E book, maybe even an essential one. Giving it 4.5 out of 5 isn't quite fair to all the excellence within. Maybe 9.5 out of 10 would give you a better sense of its value. In other words, it's not a B, or a B+, it's an A, right on the border of A+."

Viktor Coble listed Xanthar's Guide To Everything as #8 on CBR's 2021 "D&D: 10 Best Supplemental Handbooks" list, stating that "unlike a lot of the other books in 5e, it is a lot more versatile. Not only does it have the feeling of a campaign plot hook, but it also offers a lot of new subclasses, spells, and tools for new ways to play and understand the game."
