= Mordenkainen's Tome of Foes =

Tabletop role-playing game supplement

- Cover
- Genre: Role-playing game
- Publisher: Wizards of the Coast
- Publication date: 29 May 2018
- Media type: Print (hardcover)
- Pages: 256
- ISBN: 978-0-7869-6624-0

Mordenkainen's Tome of Foes is a sourcebook for the 5th edition of the Dungeons & Dragons fantasy role-playing game, published in 2018. It is, in part, a supplement to the 5th edition Monster Manual and the Players Handbook.

== Contents ==
This book adds a variety of new playable races and expands on existing creatures in the Monster Manual in addition to adding many new ones. The book also contains marginalia by Mordenkainen, a wizard originally created by Gary Gygax for his World of Greyhawk campaign. The book expands on existing setting and background information for the main setting of the game.

- Chapter 1: The Blood War
  - 8 new Tiefling subraces
  - Lords of the Nine and other devil lore
  - Princes of the Abyss and other demon lore
  - Fiendish history, cults and more
- Chapter 2: Elves
  - 3 new Elf subraces including the return of the Eladrin and Shadar-kai
  - Elven history, religion, outlook and more
- Chapter 3: Dwarves and Duergar
  - Duergar racial traits
  - History of the Dwarf/Duergar war, relations with dragons and more
- Chapter 4: Gith and Their Endless War
  - Githyanki and Githzerai racial traits
  - Wars, history, culture and more
- Chapter 5: Halflings and Gnomes
  - Deep Gnome racial traits
  - Halfling lifestyle, mythology and more
  - Gnome locales, gods and more
- Chapter 6: Bestiary
  - 140 new monsters complete with game statistics and lore including the Astral dreadnought, Gray render, and Tortle
- Appendix: Monster Lists

== Publication history ==
In February 2018, Mordenkainen's Tome of Foes was announced. From May 7, 2018 to May 18, 2018, Wizards of the Coast released two podcasts a day to support the launch. An exclusive edition with alternate cover art by Vance Kelly was released early to select game shops on May 18, 2018. The book was published on May 29, 2018. The book was also released as a digital product through the following Wizards of the Coast licensees: D&D Beyond, Fantasy Grounds, and Roll20.

The Oblex, one of the monsters in this book, was conceived by Make-A-Wish recipient Nolan Whale during his day at Wizards of the Coast. SyFy Wire in 2018 called it one of "The 9 Scariest, Most Unforgettable Monsters From Dungeons & Dragons", saying that "Eaten by an ooze that can then use your memory and form to trick and lure others in? That’s the stuff of horrors — and the stuff of an epic adventure. If you weren't paranoid about other characters before, you should be now!"

=== D&D Beyond delisting ===
The digital edition on D&D Beyond was delisted on May 17, 2022 which corresponds with the digital release of Mordenkainen Presents: Monsters of the Multiverse (2022). Monsters of the Multiverse contains revised versions of the player races and monsters originally published in Volo's Guide to Monsters (2016) and Mordenkainen's Tome of Foes. In May 2022, D&D Beyond stated that users will retain access to previously purchased copies of Volo's Guide to Monsters and Mordenkainen's Tome of Foes. Christian Hoffer, for ComicBook.com in May 2022, commented that "one major concern about the delisting is access to the chapters of lores contained in Volo's Guide to Monsters and Mordenkainen's Tome of Foes. Both books contained dozens of pages of lore about the D&D multiverse that don't appear in Monsters of the Multiverse. [...] D&D Beyond has not said whether the various expanded lore chapters will be available to D&D Beyond players moving forward, or if they'll be delisted and essentially removed from access by new players moving forward. Of course, D&D players can still read the lore in Volo's Guide to Monsters and Mordenkainen's Tome of Foes by purchasing physical copies of the books, which will still be available even after Monsters of the Multiverse is released next week".

== Reception ==
Mordenkainen's Tome of Foes won the 2019 Origins Award for best "Role-Playing Game Supplement".

Bleeding Cool gave a positive review, appreciating the addition of sub-races to Tieflings and details on conflict within Elf and Gith society, also allowing Gith PCs to become a viable option.

Rpg.net gave a rating of 83% with a positive response to the tone captured in the book and the planar background and resources which it gives to DMs. The score was lowered due to the lack of a PDF version that didn't rely on a third-party app, and for reusing verbatim much material from previous editions.

Cameron Kunzelman, for Paste, wrote that "on one hand, I don’t think that Mordenkainen’s Tome of Foes is a bad sourcebook for D&D. It has lots of great information about the different playable species of the game, their pantheons of good and evil gods, and solid explanations for how those gods impact the long and short term lives of those species. [...] Asmodeus, the lead devil of the cosmology, is delightfully Satanic, and even reading through the book I was trying to figure out how to fit him into the campaign that I am currently running without disrupting the flow and feeling of the world that I am working in. And that, for me, is the other hand: Mordenkainen's Tome of Foes feels like a book you need to build your campaign around. The two previous sourcebooks of its type, Xanathar's Guide to Everything and Volo's Guide to Monsters, are both books that I use constantly as a Dungeon Master. The former is a rules expansion and clarification that helps to build out the interactions of any campaign, and the latter is a book of monsters that any party could come upon during any given romp through the world. They are books that are grounded in the dusty roads and dirty swords of fantasy tabletop campaigns, and they slot easily into the workflow that I have to make those kinds of adventures feel good. Mordenkainen’s Tome of Foes doesn’t work that way. It starts at a very high level of the D&D cosmology, and it feels harder to borrow from or augment than other D&D source books".

Rob Hudak, for SLUG Magazine, wrote that "Tome of Foes has little mechanical application for most players outside of the additional playable races, save for probably the most important facet in all role-playing games—inspiration.[...] Tome of Foes may have the pages you need to conjure richly imagined facets for both playable characters and narrative threads alike, and I think it’s in that latter category where this book offers the greatest value. From the position as a dungeon master, Mordenkainen’s Tome of Foes is a must-buy. There are a couple sections of the bestiary that feel slightly recycled, namely the demon and devil lord stat blocks. The adventure Out of the Abyss has a dedicated segment specifically for these unholy rulers and their context in this region, but that’s ultimately a negligible detail when you consider the immense top-level detailed contribution to the unremitting conflict between them. I vastly prefer the direction and focus 5E took with its supplementary books by dressing them in a vibrant tapestry built on decades of D&D history. When flipping through dozens of new monstrosities on display, I become giddy with anticipation for the countless opportunities to terrify and captivate my players".

In a review of Mordenkainen's Tome of Foes in Black Gate, Howard Andrew Jones said "This one gets two thumbs way up from me. Referring to my review of Xanathar's Guide earlier this year, I see that I gave it a 9.5, docking it only because I thought it wasted space on a mostly useless appendix. I don’t think the Tome can be knocked for anything at all, so that means it gets a whopping 10. Wow."
