= Magali Villeneuve =

French fantasy illustrator (born 1980)

- Born: 18 March 1980 (age 46); Bordeaux, France
- Occupation: Artist
- Website: http://www.magali-villeneuve.com/

Magali Villeneuve (born 1980) is a French illustrator, freelance fantasy artist, and fantasy author. Her art has been used for official games and products set in many large fantasy universes and franchises, including Magic: The Gathering, A Song of Ice and Fire, Star Wars, Warhammer, The Lord of the Rings, and Arkham Horror.

== Early life, education, and family ==
Villeneuve was born in Bordeaux, France in 1980. She did not attend school to be an artist; instead, she is completely self-taught. Today, she lives in Bruyères with her husband.

== Career ==
Villeneuve began illustrating professionally in 2006. As she did not receive any formal artistic training, her first commissions were for book covers from small publishers. After reading Robert Jordan's Wheel of Time series, her "goals changed": she abandoned her ambition to work as a Disney animator in favor of fantasy illustrations. Discovering one day in a library that Fantasy Flight Games published a book of A Song of Ice and Fire illustrations, she sent her portfolio to the company, netting her her first commission from the American game company. From this partnership, she worked on illustrations for a number of different trading card games, board games, and role-playing games set in several different fantasy worlds.

In 2012, after several years of experience illustrating card games for Fantasy Flight Games, Villeneuve began contributing illustrations to Wizards of the Coast for Magic: The Gathering cards. She has since gone on to work with several other publishing and video game companies, including Cygames, Random House, Del Rey, and Titan Publishing Group, for which she produced illustrations for Star Wars. Villeneuve has created two art covers for Dungeons & Dragons sourcebooks: Guildmasters' Guide to Ravnica (2018) and Tasha's Cauldron of Everything (2020).

Although she originally painted her pieces, such as her book covers, Villeneuve has since transitioned to work completely digitally, stating that she "couldn't make it without a digital technique."

Villeneuve is also the author of La Dernière Terre ("Line of Descent"), a series of dark fantasy books.
