= Mordenkainen Presents: Monsters of the Multiverse =

Tabletop Dungeons & Dragons role-playing game supplement

- Cover art by Greg Rutkowski
- Rules required: Dungeons & Dragons, 5th edition
- Lead designers: Jeremy Crawford
- Authors: Original Design: Jeremy Crawford, Adam Lee, Mike Mearls, Christopher Perkins, Ben Petrisor, Sean K Reynolds, Robert J. Schwalb, Matt Sernett, Chris Sims, Nolan Whale, Steve Winter; Revision Design: Sydney Adams, Judy Bauer, Jeremy Crawford, Makenzie De Armas, Dan Dillon, Ari Levitch, Ben Petrisor, Taymoor Rehman
- First published: January 25, 2022 (boxed set); May 16, 2022 (physical & digital release)
- ISBN: 978-0-7869-6787-2

Mordenkainen Presents: Monsters of the Multiverse (Monsters of the Multiverse) is a sourcebook for the 5th edition of the Dungeons & Dragons fantasy role-playing game, originally published as part of a box set in January 2022. It was published as a standalone edition in May 2022. The book is a supplement to the 5th edition Monster Manual (2014) and Player's Handbook (2014). It is also a replacement book for two older supplements – Volo's Guide to Monsters (2016) and Mordenkainen's Tome of Foes (2018).

== Contents ==
The book updates a variety of options for both players and Dungeon Masters:

- 33 player races
- Bestiary that contains 268 monster stat blocks

== Publication history ==
The book was originally published as part of the Dungeons & Dragons Rules Expansion Gift Set on January 25, 2022. It was scheduled to have a standalone release on May 17, 2022; however, it released a day earlier on May 16.

Monsters of the Multiverse revises previously published aspects of 5th Edition Dungeons & Dragons (D&D). Both player races and monsters were rebalanced. Jeremy Crawford, principal rules designer for D&D, said the revised rules are backward compatible. Setting specific lore and alignments were removed to allow for broader story creation by Dungeon Masters and players. Polygon highlighted that this "will also give Wizards of the Coast more elbow room to expand its multiverse, either relaunching classic settings like Dragonlance and Spelljammer or unleashing entirely new settings built from scratch". Monster challenge ratings were not changed; instead, monster stat blocks were adjusted to better represent their challenge rating. TechRaptor stated that mechanically for player races the revision means "the removal of set Ability scores, [...] a change that was first introduced in Tasha's Cauldron of Everything. [...] Races might also get new Traits entirely, or simply have their traits renamed to something more generalized".

=== Digital edition ===
The book is also available as a digital product through the following Wizards of the Coast licensees on May 16, 2022: D&D Beyond, Fantasy Grounds, and Roll20. Christian Hoffer, for ComicBook.com in January 2022, reported that "with past updates to content, either via errata or updates in new books, D&D Beyond has updated the stat blocks for all of its subscribers regardless as to whether they purchased the updated content or not. [...] However, this will not be the case with Monsters of the Multiverse, especially as some of the changes made in the book are considered unpopular with a segment of fans. [...] [D&D Beyond head Joe Starr] didn't specify exactly how it would implement the new stat blocks and player races found in the book".

On May 10, 2022, it was announced that the digital release of Monsters of the Multiverse will correspond with the delisting of Volo's Guide to Monsters (2016) and Mordenkainen's Tome of Foes (2018) on D&D Beyond as Monsters of the Multiverse revises the player races and monsters previously published in those sourcebooks. D&D Beyond then confirmed that users will retain access to previously purchased copies of Volo's Guide to Monsters and Mordenkainen's Tome of Foes. D&D Beyond also stated that they "may update naming conventions of content to easily differentiate our listings" for users who have purchased access to both old and new content. Christian Hoffer, for ComicBook.com in May 2022, commented that "one major concern about the delisting is access to the chapters of lores contained in Volo's Guide to Monsters and Mordenkainen's Tome of Foes. Both books contained dozens of pages of lore about the D&D multiverse that don't appear in Monsters of the Multiverse. [...] D&D Beyond has not said whether the various expanded lore chapters will be available to D&D Beyond players moving forward, or if they'll be delisted and essentially removed from access by new players moving forward. Of course, D&D players can still read the lore in Volo's Guide to Monsters and Mordenkainen's Tome of Foes by purchasing physical copies of the books, which will still be available even after Monsters of the Multiverse is released next week".

== Related products ==
The boxed set, Dungeons & Dragons Rules Expansion Gift Set, contains the Monsters of the Multiverse along with new printings of Xanathar's Guide to Everything (2017) and Tasha's Cauldron of Everything (2020). An exclusive edition, with white foil alternate art covers by Joy Ang, is only available through local game stores.

== Reception ==
In Publishers Weekly's "Best-selling Books Week Ending May 21, 2022", Monsters of the Multiverse was #2 in "Hardcover Nonfiction" with 23,889 units sold which Publishers Weekly called a "solid debut". The book remained on the top 25 list for fourteen weeks. (Note: Subsequently, it slipped to #5, #10, #20, and then #21 in the following weeks.) In USA Today's "Best-Selling Books List for May 22, 2022", Monsters of the Multiverse was #10; it slipped to #95 the following week.

Monsters of the Multiverse was included on Kotaku's 2022 "The 10 Best Tabletop Roleplaying Books Of 2022" list — Claire Jackson commented that both the updated monsters and player race options make Monsters of the Multiverse a contender for "fourth core book". Jackson wrote that the player races is where the book "really earns its place. It contains the more flexible and much better race rules from Tasha's Cauldron Of Everything, where stat boosts aren't based on essentializing qualities, but can be chosen by the player. It also adds so many more options for fun characters that the Player's Handbook looks like a mere playtest of suggestions. It's a solid D&D book, and a great resource for both Dungeon Masters and players".

Chris de Hoog, for CGMagazine, called Monsters of the Multiverse a "very straightforward book" and that it "isn't the most flashy or compelling book". de Hoog wrote that "many of the creatures listed within are reprinted from other sources, like the similar Volo's Guide to Monsters or Mordenkainen's Tome of Foes, but these reprints have subtle updates that make a big difference at the game table. [...] The other benefit of reprinting monsters in central tomes like this is that you don't necessarily need to buy every other book just to get the stats for a couple of baddies you'd like to use—nor do you need to cart as many books to game nights". de Hoog stated that the Dungeons & Dragons Rules Expansion Gift Set is "a must-have if you don't already own its tomes", however, "Monsters of the Multiverse is a little thin on its own. It will be a valuable resource, so this is a more compelling way to add it to your library—especially if you can get your hands on the unique version available only at independent game stores".

Both Polygon and SyFy Wire highlighted that Monsters of the Multiverse is an indication of the future design direction of Dungeons & Dragons. Charlie Hall, for Polygon, commented on the previous "edition wars" when Dungeons & Dragons "transitioned from 3rd edition, to 3.5, to 4th edition. Instead, it appears that Wizards will be taking a far more incremental approach this time, weaving in changes both large and small while still maintaining a connection to what came before". Hall also commented that Monsters of the Multiverse was originally intended to be published in time for the winter 2021 holidays as a standalone book and as part of the box set; however, due to "ongoing global supply chain issues" both releases were delayed – "It's an approach to releasing new content that the company has not attempted before in 5th edition, and this time, looks to have backfired, effectively gating off this new content for a period of time unless you're willing to pay a premium".

Additionally, both Polygon and SyFy Wire highlighted that the sourcebook's design philosophy attempts to move away from racist elements of Dungeons & Dragons. James Grebey, for SyFy Wire, wrote that the updated rules decouple "cultural characteristics from the physical or magical ones" and it "removes setting-specific information about the races, which combined with the more flexible stat alignment should make them easier to slot into any fantasy world [...]. Furthermore, the old way of creating characters made it so some races were poor choices for certain classes. [...] The monsters section of the book aims to make DMs' lives easier, like by simplifying how monsters cast spells".

Andrew Stretch, for TechRaptor, commented that while there are quality of life improvements in the design changes, the book seems aimed at newcomers and not towards people with "an expansive 5e library". He highlighted that monster stat blocks have been reordered based on "action economy"; creatures with spellcasting have the biggest stat block changes. On the changes to player races, Stretch wrote, "one of the major things that you'll notice picking up this book is that a lot of the greater context about a race and its history in the world is no longer included, what was previously almost a page worth of information teaching you about a race's place in the world is now a brief paragraph. It's been explained that this is a decision to allow readers to approach any of the races without preconceived notions, or feel that if they want their character to be from a certain place, or act a certain way they don't need to jump through hoops to justify why that would be possible. Reading through the player choices and not seeing this information definitely, has me feeling conflicted. [...] It really will come down to how much you like the framework provided to you by Wizards of the Coast whether you do or don't like the exclusion of this extra information".
