= Volo's Guide to Monsters =

Tabletop role-playing game supplement for 5th Edition Dungeons & Dragons

- Cover
- Genre: Role-playing games
- Publisher: Wizards of the Coast
- Publication date: 15 November 2016
- Media type: Print (hardcover)
- Pages: 224
- ISBN: 978-0-7869-6607-3 (Limited Edition Cover), 978-0-7869-6601-1 (Standard Edition)

Volo's Guide to Monsters is a sourcebook for the 5th edition of the Dungeons & Dragons fantasy role-playing game, published in 2016. It is, in part, a supplement to the 5th edition Monster Manual and the Players Handbook.

== Contents ==
Volo's Guide to Monsters adds a variety of new playable races and expands on existing creatures in the Monster Manual in addition to adding new ones. The book also contains marginalia by both Volothamp Geddarm and Elminster of Shadowdale.

- Chapter 1: Monster Lore
  - 9 iconic D&D monsters are provided additional information about their origins, their dispositions and behaviors, and their lairs.
- Chapter 2: Character Races
  - 7 new character races are presented in full including the Firbolg, Goliath and Tabaxi.
  - 6 additional 'monstrous' character traits are given in brief, including the iconic goblin, kobold and orc for groups that want to explore less conventional character types.
- Chapter 3: Bestiary
  - Over 100 new monsters complete with game statistics and lore including the froghemoth, the neogi, and the vargouille.
- Appendixes
  - A: Assorted Beasts
  - B: Nonplayer Characters
  - C: Monster Lists
  - Maps of Monster Lairs

== Publication history ==
This book was released on November 15, 2016. An exclusive edition with an alternate art cover by Hydro74 was pre-released to select game shops early in November 2016. The book was also released as a digital product through the following Wizards of the Coast licensees: D&D Beyond, Fantasy Grounds, and Roll20.

In October 2020, an errata for the book was released. This errata included changes such as removing stat penalties for playable monster races and makes the changes to playable monster races seen in campaign specific settings (Eberron: Rising From The Last War and Explorer's Guide to Wildemount) canon for all of Dungeons & Dragons.

=== D&D Beyond delisting ===
The digital edition on D&D Beyond was delisted on May 17, 2022, which corresponds with the digital release of Mordenkainen Presents: Monsters of the Multiverse (2022). Monsters of the Multiverse contains revised versions of the player races and monsters originally published in Volo's Guide to Monsters and Mordenkainen's Tome of Foes (2018). In May 2022, D&D Beyond stated that users will retain access to previously purchased copies of Volo's Guide to Monsters and Mordenkainen's Tome of Foes. Christian Hoffer, for ComicBook.com in May 2022, commented that "one major concern about the delisting is access to the chapters of lores contained in Volo's Guide to Monsters and Mordenkainen's Tome of Foes. Both books contained dozens of pages of lore about the D&D multiverse that don't appear in Monsters of the Multiverse. [...] D&D Beyond has not said whether the various expanded lore chapters will be available to D&D Beyond players moving forward, or if they'll be delisted and essentially removed from access by new players moving forward. Of course, D&D players can still read the lore in Volo's Guide to Monsters and Mordenkainen's Tome of Foes by purchasing physical copies of the books, which will still be available even after Monsters of the Multiverse is released next week".

== Reception ==
Volo's Guide to Monsters won Best Supplement and Best Artwork & Presentation at the 2016 Golden Geek Awards (determined by users of BoardGameGeek, RPGGeek and VideoGameGeek). In Publishers Weekly's "Best-selling Books Week Ending November 20, 2016", Volo's Guide to Monsters was #13 in "Hardcover Nonfiction".

For The A.V. Club, Nick Wanserski wrote that "what I've enjoyed about Volo's is that it understands how role-playing game source books, at their best, serve two distinct purposes. As a direct campaign aid, it provides more mechanical ingredients like monsters, player characters, and treasure. Secondly it serves as an idle reading companion—something to flip through and explore and pick out the appealing ideas. Even without actively playing a 5th Edition campaign, there's a lot in here that I will happily slice out and reassemble in my Frankenstein's monster of a campaign".

Zack Furniss, for Destructoid, wrote that "in the second chapter, there are new character race options. I was expecting only a few, but there are seven new (well five, if you're counting downloadable supplements) races and six monster races. The angelic Aasimar are more fleshed out here than in the Dungeon Master's Guide, and the huge, mountain-dwelling Goliaths are no longer relegated solely to the downloadable Elemental Evil Player's Campaign. [...] Monster races aren't quite as in-depth, lacking history and storytelling hooks, but still include enough information to be playable. Bugbears, goblins, hobgoblins, kobolds, orcs, and yuan-ti purebloods are all ready to be played now. An all-monster campaign could be a fun, if I ever have the time to run it. [...] I'll be plucking out nasties and their stories to creep out my friends for a long time. I love the marriage of narrative and mechanical information. It's easy to ignore if you just want to have new stat blocks, but it's hard not to get sucked in and read all of it".

For Polygon, Charlie Hall wrote that "most of the information is great fodder for dungeon masters. How do you roleplay a beholder? How do you speak like a giant? What does their four-tier caste system contribute to goblin society? What does a gnoll chant to keep his spirits up while on the hunt? What is the lifecycle of a mind flayer? [...] Ever wondered what a hag is most likely to drive off the used car lot, or fancied a careful examination of the kobold pantheon? It's all in there, and something is going to light a fire in your mind and bring a richer, more memorable experience to the table. The second third of the book might be my favorite. I'm not able to share much, but suffice it to say that with Volo's Guide both dungeon masters and players will be able to bring new races to the table, both as player and non-player characters. [...] The final third contains rules for 96 monsters that are new to fifth edition, including the Gauth and the Mindwitness".

On using Volo's point of view as the framing device for this book, Cameron Kunzelman for Paste wrote "imagine that Ken Jennings was a drunk, really cared about being able to name all the animals of the zoo, and was the sole grantor of Michelin stars across the world. That's Volo. [...] As a character, Volo is brilliant because he is a device through which the designers of the Forgotten Realms can give Dungeon Masters a set of bounds.[...] That 'thinks he knows' is crucial, because having Volo write the guide means that he can be wrong. From a design perspective, Volo is a way of giving DMs a toolbox that they don't have to be completely adherent to. Whatever Volo thinks or writes can be slightly off the mark. Maybe he only saw a tavern during the daytime. Maybe he cut some corners. Nesting world design within the subjective opinions of an expansive, world-trotting character with a penchant for embellishment solves a lot of problems and generally makes the job of being a DM a little more fun". In a later review, Kunzelman wrote that "my one serious critique of Volo's Guide to Monsters is that it doesn't do enough with its supposed writer. The character Volo has done a number of things: he wrote guides to specific cities, appeared in games, and even wrote the manual for a Baldur's Gate game. [...] Volo's Guide to Monsters has snippets of info from Volo, but it mostly tells the DM facts about a world, rather than opinions, rumors and suspicions that might be completely unfounded. [...] In any case, the book is interesting and genuinely helpful for any given Dungeon Master who might be using these monsters in her campaign".

In a review of Volo's Guide to Monsters in Black Gate, Howard Andrew Jones said "In sum, this is a great addition to any DM's library. Whether you're using 5e or some compatible system, you'll find yourself inspired by the countless clever ideas inside."
