= List of Dungeons & Dragons 3.5 edition monsters =

Monsters in Dungeons & Dragons 3.5 edition

Dungeons & Dragons version 3.5 (see editions of Dungeons & Dragons) was released in 2003. The first book containing monsters to be published for this edition of the tabletop game was the Monster Manual, released along with the other two "core" rulebooks.

== WTC 17755 – Monster Manual (2003) ==
This was the initial monster book for the Dungeons & Dragons 3.5 edition, published in 2003. It includes all of the monsters from the previous third edition Monster Manual, revising them for the version 3.5 rules, as well as including a small number of monsters not in the previous Monster Manual. This book features an alphabetical listing of monsters on pages 3–4, an introduction on pages 5–7, the monster descriptions on pages 8–289, instructions for improving the monsters in the book on pages 290–294 and making monsters on pages 295–302, skills and feats for monsters on pages 303–304, a glossary on pages 305–317, and a list of the monsters in the book ranked by challenge rating on pages 318–319.

Creature	Page	Other Appearances	Variants	Description
Aboleth	8–9			Includes a description of the aboleth mage, an aboleth 10th-level wizard. Ancient and powerful aquatic beings, aboleth in the game use their telepathic powers to influence and enslave mortals from behind the scenes in their bid to restore the position of dominance they lost through the rise of the gods themselves. SyFy Wire contributor Lisa Granshaw included them in her 2018 list of "The 9 Scariest, Most Unforgettable Monsters From Dungeons & Dragons" due to their impressive abilities and vengefulness.
Achaierai	9–10			CJ Miozzi included the achaierai on The Escapist's list of "The Dumbest Dungeons & Dragons Monsters Ever (And How To Use Them)".
Allip	10			
Angel	10–13			Described are the astral deva, planetar, and solar. Celestials from the Outer Planes, "charming creatures protecting the universe against evil".
Animated object	13–14			Described are the tiny, small, medium, large, huge, gargantuan, and colossal animated object
Ankheg	14–15			
Aranea	15–16			
Archon	16–19			Described are the lantern archon, hound archon, and trumpet archon. Includes a description of the hound archon hero, a hound archon 11th-level paladin
Arrowhawk	19–20			Described are the juvenile, adult, and elder arrowhawk
Assassin vine	20			
Athach	21			
Azer	21–22			
Barghest	22–23			Includes a description of the greater barghest, an advanced barghest
Basilisk	23–24			Includes a description of the abyssal greater basilisk, an advanced basilisk. Based on the creature from medieval bestiaries. In the original Monster Manual it is described as a reptilian monster whose gaze can turn creatures to stone. AD&D's basilisk was also adapted into the Magic: The Gathering trading card game, with a depiction taken from the Monster Manual being used in a prototype version.
Behir	25			
Beholder	25–27			Described are the gauth and the beholder. A large orb dominated by a central eye and a large toothy maw, with 10 smaller eyes on stalks sprouting from the top of the orb; the large eye negates all magic and the smaller eyes cause a variety of magical effects. A "creature that looks at you and is destroying you by the power of its magical eyes". A terrible beast, but depicted as "a cuddly rosy ball with too many eyes". Designed to counter magic-using characters while being a formidable opponent for a whole party due to its versatility. Considered one of "the game's signature monsters" by Philip J. Clements. A "classic", "iconic", as well as "one of the most feared and fearsome monsters of the game", present through all editions. The gauth was "radically changed" as compared to Advanced Dungeons & Dragons.
Belker	27			
Blink dog	28			
Bodak	28			
Bugbear	29			Hairy cousin of the goblin, for the most part presented as inherently evil before the 5th edition of the game,
Bulette	30			Also called land shark, inspired by a plastic toy from Hong Kong. In his 2019 book The Monsters Know What They're Doing, author Keith Ammann called bulettes "brutes tailor-made to give your players jump scares" and found its preferences and aversions for the meat of different humanoid races "ludicrous".
Carrion crawler	30–31			
Celestial creature	31–32			Template; sample celestial creature is a celestial lion
Centaur	32–33			Based on the creature from Greek mythology.
Chaos beast	33			
Chimera	34			The chimera is based on the chimera of Greek mythology as found in the Iliad by Homer, "stronger than a centaur but weaker than a sphinx". Present in the game since the earliest edition.
Choker	34–35			
Chuul	35–36			
Cloaker	36			An original creation for the game's artificial underground environment, this monster was designed as a trap for unwary player characters; it looks like a living cloak with teeth.
Cockatrice	37			Based on the creature from medieval bestiaries.
Couatl	37–38			Based on the creature from Mesoamerican religion.
Darkmantle	38			
Delver	39			
Demon	40–48			Described are the babau, balor, bebilith, dretch, glabrezu, hezrou, marilith, nalfeshnee, quasit, retriever, succubus, and vrock. Tanar'ri were renamed from demons in response to moral panic, many were based on figures from Christian demonology. Considered among the "standard repertoire of "Monsters"" by Fabian Perlini-Pfister. In a review of Planescape Monstrous Compendium Appendix II for Arcane magazine, the reviewer cites the culture of the tanar'ri as helping "give the Planes a solid base of peoples". The succubus is a typical example of a demon, belonging to the "standard repertoire of "Monsters"", and one of those contributing to the moral panic; also an instance of the sexist tropes the game draws on which presented female sexuality as inherently dangerous. Rob Bricken of io9 identified the succubus as one of "The 12 Most Obnoxious Dungeons & Dragons Monsters". Featuring a highly-muscled man-like body and bat wings, the balor is based on and renamed from the Balrog from J.R.R. Tolkien's legendarium. Reviewer Philippe Tessier found the quasit "very nice" and interesting when made available as a familiar.
Derro	49			
Destrachan	49–50			
Devil	50–58			Described are the barbed devil (hamatula), bearded devil (barbazu), bone devil (osyluth), chain devil (kyton), erinyes, hellcat (bezekira), horned devil (cornugon), ice devil (gelugon), imp, lemure, and pit fiend. Don Turnbull considered the devils the most prominent among the new monsters introduced in the Monster Manual: "they are all pretty strong and compare not unfavourably in this respect with the Demons we already know". Renamed from devils in response to moral panic. Many were based on figures from Christian demonology. Lemure are among lowest of fiends, these "living piles of rotting flesh that look like puddles of pink skin" are one initial incarnation of evil souls when arriving at the lower planes. Screen Rant reviewer Scott Baird ranked them among the weakest monsters in the game. The erinyes are based on the figures from Greek mythology.
Devourer	58–59			A giant skeleton that is holding a small figure prisoner in their ribcage, this creature is highlighted by reviewer Kaneda for characters to steer away from.
Digester	59			
Dinosaur	60–62			Described are the deinonychus, elasmosaurus, megaraptor, triceratops, and tyrannosaurus. Considered among the "standard repertoire of "Monsters"", and among the 12 most underrated monsters, "a creature as large and fearsome as a dragon but without all the hype".
Dire animal	62–66			Described are the dire ape, dire badger, dire bat, dire bear, dire boar, dire lion, dire rat, dire shark, dire tiger, dire weasel, dire wolf, and dire wolverine
Displacer beast	66–67			Includes a description of the displacer beast pack lord, an advanced displacer beast. A magical creature resembling a puma with a tentacle growing from each shoulder, it hates all forms of life, and always appears 3 feet from its actual position. Based on the alien Coeurl from the short story Black Destroyer by A. E. van Vogt. David M. Ewalt, in his book Of Dice and Men, discussed several monsters appearing in the original Monster Manual, describing displacer beasts as looking like "pumas with thorn-covered tentacles growing out of their shoulders". Rob Bricken from io9 named the displacer beast as the 2nd most memorable D&D monster.
Doppelganger	67–68			
Dragon, true	68–88			Powerful and intelligent, usually winged reptiles with magical abilities and breath weapon. The different subraces, distinguished by their colouring, vary in power. The dragon has been referred to as the "iconic creature for D&D adventurers to conquer".
Chromatic dragons	70–78			Described are the black dragon, blue dragon, green dragon, red dragon, and white dragon. For each type of dragon, stats are given for the wyrmling, very young, young, juvenile, young adult, adult, mature adult, old, very old, ancient, wyrm, and great wyrm variety
Metallic dragons	79–88			Described are the brass dragon, bronze dragon, copper dragon, gold dragon, and silver dragon. For each type of dragon, stats are given for the wyrmling, very young, young, juvenile, young adult, adult, mature adult, old, very old, ancient, wyrm, and great wyrm variety
Dragon turtle	88			Present in the game since its inception.
Dragonne	89			Present "in every edition of the game", James Wyatt stated it was "probably the oldest manifestation in the game of the idea of a half-dragon". Renamed to liondrake in 5th edition.
Drider	89–90			
Dryad	90–91			Based on the dryad from classical sources. The dryad appears as a player character class in Tall Tales of the Wee Folk in the "DM's booklet" (1989).
Dwarf	91–93			Described are the hill dwarf, the deep dwarf, and the duergar. Based on Tolkien's version of the dwarf. Often depicted as "short, stout, and fond of ale", "bearded masters of metalworking" and "predisposed towards a "good" moral alignment", "tend to embody an extreme vision of masculinity". The duergar are "the infamous dark dwarves", an "evil and avaricious" dwarven subrace with psionic powers. ComicBook.com contributor Christian Hoffer considered the struggle of the duergar with their dwarven cousins one "of the great conflicts that make up the D&D multiverse". Backstab reviewer Michaël Croitoriu found the duergar interesting as a player character option.
Eagle, giant	93			
Eladrin	93–95			Described are the bralani and ghaele. Celestials from the Outer Planes, "charming creatures protecting the universe against evil".
Elemental	95–101			Described are the air elemental, earth elelemental, fire elemental, and water elemental. For each type of elemental, stats are given for the small, medium, large, huge, greater, and elder variety. Powerful creatures in the game; a characteristic of the air elemental is the ability of rapid movement.
Elf	101–104			Described are the high elf, half-elf, aquatic elf, drow, gray elf, wild elf, and wood elf. Based on Tolkien's version of the elf, "quick but fragile", with senses surpassing a human's, often depicted as "effeminate" and "predisposed towards a "good" moral alignment". The drow were made famous R. A. Salvatore's Drizzt novels, these dark elves from the game influenced subsequent works of fantasy. Drow have a gender-based caste system that says "a great deal about attitudes towards gender roles in the real world". Bleeding Cool reviewer Gavin Sheehan considered "the schism between drow and other elves" one "of the most contentious relationships in the multiverse" of D&D. A drider is a "monster that looks like a centaur only with the bottom half of a spider instead of a horse." Half-elves are "loosely based off of Elrond Half-elven".
Ethereal filcher	104–105			
Ethereal marauder	105			
Ettercap	106			
Ettin	106–107			
Fiendish creature	107–108			Template; sample fiendish creature is a fiendish dire rat
Formian	108–111			Described are the formian worker, formian warrior, formian taskmaster, formian myrmarch, and formian queen
Frost worm	111–112			
Fungus	112–113			Described are the shrieker and violet fungus. Author Ben Woodard called D&D's fungi horrific in their variety, not only due to their poisonous nature but their creepy ability to move. Scott Baird from Screen Rant ranked the man-sized shrieker among the weakest monsters in the game, at "the bottom of the mushroom monster food chain": They "can be used as cheap alarm systems for Underdark societies, but they possess no combat abilities of their own. The only thing a shrieker can do is shriek".
Gargoyle	113–114			AD&D's gargoyle was adapted into the Magic: The Gathering trading card game, with a depiction taken from the Monster Manual being used in a prototype version.
Genie	114–116			Described are the djinni, efreeti, and janni. Based on notions from Middle Eastern culture, genies in the game are powerful elemental spirits from the Inner Planes, each of the four classical elements having its own subspecies of genie: djinn for air, dao for earth, efreet for fire. The djinn and efreet have namesakes from Arabic folklore also associated with air and fire, respectively. The dao were newly invented for the game altogether to fill the gap for the remaining element. A depiction of an "evil [...] efreet" already appeared in the original Dungeons & Dragons (1974) edition, another "enormous, devilish red" one was the main feature of the cover of the 1st edition Dungeon Master's Guide. Within the game's cosmology they were based on the Plane of Fire, centered around the "fabled City of Brass".
Ghost	116–118			Template; sample ghost is a 5th-level human fighter. Inspired by Gothic fiction, a typical denizen of the Ravenloft setting.
Ghoul	118–119			Described are the ghoul and ghast. Undead with "terrible claws". AD&D's ghouls were also adapted into the Magic: The Gathering trading card game, with a depiction taken from the Monster Manual being used in a prototype version.
Giant	119–125			Described are the cloud giant, fire giant, frost giant, hill giant, stone giant, and storm giant. Includes a description of the frost giant jarl, an 8th-level blackguard. Overlarge powerful humanoids with a self-involved social focus, usually presented as the "bad guys". Based on mythological figures and Tolkien, their stone-throwing ability indicates their creative roots in wargaming.
Gibbering mouther	126			A creature with many eyes and mouths. Witwer et al. found Erol Otus' early depiction "perversely beautiful", the artist's surrealist style very suited for this bizarre monster.
Girallon	126–127			
Githyanki	127–128			Xenophobic humanoids with gaunt stature, leathery yellow skin and fangs. Inhabitants of the Astral Plane, and ancient enemies of the githzerai, githyanki are considered to "boast some excellent twists" as non-player characters, but "little more than dextrous, not to mention ugly, egg layers" as PCs by reviewer Trenton Webb Introduced by Charles Stross in White Dwarf No. 12, and officially included in the game in Fiend Folio (1981) and featured on its cover. The name was borrowed the name from a fictional race in George R. R. Martin's Dying of the Light. The githyanki/illithid relationship was inspired by Larry Niven's World of Ptavvs. The githyanki were voted among the top ten best monsters from that White Dwarf's "Fiend Factory" column. Shannon Applecline considered the githyanki one of the game's especially notable monsters. Scott Baird of the website TheGamer commented on the nature of the relationship of the githyanki to the mind flayers, to whom they were formerly enslaved: "Despite their wicked reputation, the Githyanki have an important role to play in protecting the Prime Material Plane. The Githyanki despise Mind Flayers and their armies might be the only thing holding them back. The trailer for Baldur's Gate 3 shows just how scary a single Mind Flayer ship can be, and that could happen a thousand times over if the Githyanki aren't around." ComicBook.com contributor Christian Hoffer considered "the conflict between the otherworldly githzerai and githyanki" one "of the great conflicts that make up the D&D multiverse", and praised the expanded lore presented in Mordenkainen's Tome of Foes as "certainly useful as both inspiration and as research material for building a D&D campaign."
Githzerai	129–130			Designed by Charles Stross, these humanoids are the ancient and fervent enemies of mind flayers, to whom they were formerly enslaved, and the githyanki; they are based on the plane of Limbo. A playable species in the Planescape campaign setting, reviewer Johnny L. Wilson found them a new take on the niche usually occupied by elves. Shannon Applecline considered the githzerai one of the game's especially notable monsters, while ComicBook.com contributor Christian Hoffer counted "the conflict between the otherworldly githzerai and githyanki" among "the great conflicts that make up the D&D multiverse", and praised the expanded lore presented in Mordenkainen's Tome of Foes as "certainly useful as both inspiration and as research material for building a D&D campaign."
Gnoll	130–131			Richard W. Forest assumed them to be inspired from but not resembling the gnoles conceived by Lord Dunsany, while Gary Gygax himself stated that although Dunsany's "gnole" is close", he came up with the name as "a cross between a gnome and a troll", and the description was his original creation. He wanted to create a humanoid opponent in the game to fit in between the hobgoblin and bugbear in power. Gnolls were considered one of the "five main "humanoid" races" in AD&D by Paul Karczag and Lawrence Schick.
Gnome	131–133			Described are the rock gnome, svirfneblin, and forest gnome. Player character race "often stereotyped as buffoons, illusionists, mad inventors, and many characters play them as intentionally "wacky" or anachronistic"; often conforms to the trickster archetype. "predisposed towards a "good" moral alignment".
Goblin	133–134			Based primarily on the goblins portrayed in J.R.R. Tolkien's Middle-Earth. Considered one of the "five main "humanoid" races" in AD&D by Paul Karczag and Lawrence Schick. Presented as "evil" and "predisposed towards a society of brutal regimes where the strongest rule" in the game. Suitable opponent for characters of lowest level.
Golem	134–137			Described are the clay golem, flesh golem, iron golem, and stone golem. Includes a description of the greater stone golem, an advanced stone golem. The clay golem is based on the golem of Medieval Jewish folklore, though changed from "a cherished defender to an unthinking hulk" while the flesh golem is related to Frankenstein's monster as Universal's 1931 film, seen in e.g. being empowered by electricity. All golems are inspired by Gothic fiction more generally; a typical denizen of the Ravenloft setting, and "classic" monster of the game. The influence of Dungeons & Dragons has led to the inclusion of golems in other tabletop role-playing as well as in video games.
Gorgon	137–138			"iron plated bull", based on early modern bestiaries, with only the name being derived from the Classical counterpart.
Gray render	138			
Grick	139			
Griffon	139–140			Originally based on the creature from Persian mythology.
Grimlock	140–141			
Guardinal	141–143			Described are the avoral and leonal. Powerful neutral good celestials from Elysium, each a humanoid with some animalistic characteristics. Arcane magazine cites the culture of the guardinals as helping "give the Planes a solid base of peoples".
Hag	143–144			Described are the annis, green hag, sea hag. Includes a description of the hag covey, a trio of hags. Immortal wicked and ugly powerful females with magical abilities for deception. Based on the pervasive figure from folklore, with "different interpretations of the monster around the world" being worked into different variants in the game, allowing each "a little more personality". In the view of Stag and Trammel, hags in D&D represent misogynistic and ageist tendencies in their authors. SyFy Wire in 2018 called it one of "The 9 Scariest, Most Unforgettable Monsters From Dungeons & Dragons", saying that "There are endless horrific possibilities when it comes to hags."
Half-celestial	144–146			Template; sample half-celestial is a 9th-level human paladin
Half-dragon	146–147			Template; sample half-dragon is a half-black dragon 4th-level human fighter
Half-fiend	147–149			Template; sample half-fiend is a 7th-level human cleric
Halfling	149–150			Described are the lightfoot halfling, tallfellow, and deep halfling. Based on and renamed from the hobbit in J.R.R. Tolkien's works. The hobbit first appeared as a player character class in the original 1974 edition of Dungeons & Dragons. Later the game began using the name "halfling" as an alternative to "hobbit" for legal reasons. The "halfling" appeared as a player character race in the original Player's Handbook (1978).
Harpy	150–151			Includes a description of the harpy archer, a harpy 7th-level fighter. Based on the creature from Greek mythology. Witwer et al. viewed its artistic rendering in 5th edition as "redesigned from prior editions to entice more Dungeon Master use."
Hell hound	151–152			Includes a description of the nessian warhound, an advanced hell hound
Hippogriff	152			Originally based on the creature from Persian mythology. Originally based on the creature from Persian mythology the adapted hippogriff "was among the earliest fantasy beasts introduced into the Dungeons & Dragons universe": An artistic representation drawing inspiration from real eagles and horses was used for the cover of the third booklet of the original Dungeons & Dragons (1974) edition and became one of "the game's earliest ambassadors" through use of that cover in advertisements. Gary Gygax used a story in which he received a letter asking how many eggs a Hippogriff could lay as an example of the encyclopedic knowledge which fans expected him to have over every detail of gameplay.
Hobgoblin	153–154			Muscular humanoids somewhat taller than humans with reddish skin and canine teeth. Mordenkainen Presents: Monsters of the Multiverse gave them a new background as a species originating in and expelled from the Feywild, while also presenting hobgoblins societies with different characteristics on different worlds, but all centered around forming close-knit groups.
Homunculus	154			
Howler	154–155			
Hydra	155–157			Described are the five-headed hydra, six-headed hydra, seven-headed hydra, eight-headed hydra, nine-headed hydra, ten-headed hydra, eleven-headed hydra, and twelve-headed hydra. Based on the creature from classical sources, with Heracles' famed method of slaying it adapted into a vulnerability against fire, but not with the less well-known poisonous bite, showing how the game mostly focusses on the well-known traits of mythological creatures. Present in the game since its inception. AD&D's hydra was also adapted into the Magic: The Gathering trading card game, with a depiction taken from the Monster Manual being used in a prototype version.
Inevitable	158–160			Described are the kolyarut, marut, and zelekhut
Invisible stalker	160–161			
Kobold	161–162			"[S]hort subterranean lizard-men", considered one of the "five main "humanoid" races" in AD&D by Paul Karczag and Lawrence Schick, and ranked among the weakest monsters in the game by Scott Baird from Screen Rant.
Kraken	162–163			
Krenshar	163			
Kuo-toa	163–165			"evil fish-men"
Lamia	165			
Lammasu	165–166			Includes a description of the golden protector, a lammasu with the celestial template and the half-dragon template
Lich	166–168			Template; sample lich is an 11th-level human wizard. Emaciated undead spellcaster, a "classic" monster of the game.
Lillend	168			
Lizardfolk	169			A player character race in some settings. Reviewer Chris Gigoux described them by saying "Lizard Men aren't bad, [...] they're just a simple folks, struggling to survive." In 2020, Comic Book Resources counted the lizardfolk as # 1 on the list of "10 Powerful Monster Species That You Should Play As", stating that "Along with the ability to manufacture their own weapons from the natural environment around them, they provide an excellent role-playing experience and have some pretty awesome tricks up their sleeve." An image of a lizard man by Greg Bell functioned as the logo in the early phase of TSR Hobbies, while "the bloodied bodies of lizard men" overcome by a group of adventurers featured on the cover of the 1st edition Player's Handbook, considered "arguably the most iconic piece of art in all of RPGdom" by Reactor magazine commentator Saladin Ahmed.
Locathah	169–170			
Lycanthrope	170–179			Described are the werebear, wereboar, wererat, weretiger, and werewolf. Each type is a template, with 1st-level human warrior as a sample lycanthrope for each. Additional samples include: the werewolf lord, a 10th-level human fighter; and the hill giant dire wereboar. Afflicted shapechangers, whose condition could be transmitted like a disease; some available as player character races. Depiction of the werewolf is related to those in 1930s and 1940s Hollywood movies like The Wolf Man. Ranked sixth among the ten best low-level monsters by the authors of Dungeons & Dragons For Dummies: "a classic monster", interesting due to shapechanging because "players can never be entirely sure whether that surly villager might indeed be the great black wolf who attacked their characters out in the forest." The presence of lyncanthropes in the gaming system is one of the elements that has led Christian fundamentalists to condemn Dungeons & Dragons and to associate it with the occult. Screen Rant has described the operation of lycanthropy in the game as an aspect that "makes no sense" because it is often a positive development for a character. "It is possible for a character to be infected with lycanthropy in Dungeons & Dragons and it comes highly recommended, as the benefits outweigh the negatives". It notes that "[i]n exchange for learning how to control your condition, you gain Damage Reduction, +2 to your Wisdom stat, the Scent ability, Low-Light Vision, a new Hit Dice, the Iron Will feat, and the ability to transform into a more powerful form". An illustration in one edition of the Monster Manual implied that the beast in Disney's Beauty and the Beast was a lycanthrope, with a creature having a resemblance to the Beast attacking a human resembling that film's antagonist, Gaston. Present in the game since its inception, an image of a werewolf's face by Gygax' childhood friend Tom Keogh was "[a]lmost certainly the oldest piece of art" in the original D&D.
Magmin	179			
Manticore	179–180			Based on its mythological counterpart, including the barbed tail, the manticore appeared in the game from its earliest edition.
Medusa	180			Based on the creature from classical sources but translated into species of monsters originated from "humans seeking eternal youth". Reviewer Allan Rausch found their portrayal as "a woman with snakes for hair" up to 2nd edition less compelling than their less human-like depiction in 3rd edition. Part of the game from its very beginning, a medusa was already depicted in the playtest material from 1973 for the original edition.
Mephit	180–185			Described are the air mephit, dust mephit, earth mephit, fire mephit, ice mephit, magma mephit, ooze mephit, salt mephit, steam mephit, and water mephit. First published in White Dwarf #13 (June/July 1979) under the names of fire imp, molten imp, smoke imp and steam imp, respectively (not including ice and mist mephits), originally submitted by M. Stollery. These "imps" were voted among the top ten monsters from the magazine's "Fiend Factory" column in 1980.
Merfolk	185–186			
Mimic	186			An original creation for the game's artificial underground environment, this "iconic monster" looks like a treasure chest and is designed as a trap for unwary player characters.
Mind flayer	186–188			Includes a description of the mind flayer sorcerer, a mind flayer 9th-level sorcerer. "Squid-headed humanoids", considered one of "the game's signature monsters" by Philip J. Clements. Reviewer Julien Blondel described them as vile brain-eating creatures full of psionic energy. He found them delightful creatures for a sadistic Dungeon Master to use, and a useful bridge between classic game worlds and the planes, as illithids abound in both.
Minotaur	188–189			Based on the creature from Greek mythology, but translated from a singular creature into a species. In 2021, Comic Book Resources counted the minotaur as one of the "7 Underused Monster Races in Dungeons & Dragons", stating that "far from just brutal monsters. Many are lawful by nature, which means, surprisingly, Minotaurs make for some good Paladins. They also, obviously, make for some good Barbarians, Monks and Fighters. There's a lot of potential with Minotaurs. People hate and fear them, but you might be able to play that to your advantage...or fight against the stereotypes." The minotaur was among the monsters featured as trading cards on the back of Amurol Products candy figure boxes. AD&D's minotaurs were also adapted into the Magic: The Gathering trading card game, with a depiction taken from the Monster Manual being used in a prototype version.
Mohrg	189			
Mummy	190–191			Includes a description of the mummy lord, a mummy 10th-level cleric. Powerful undead usually from desert areas, wrapped in bandages. Based on the creature from Gothic fiction and appearances in more contemporary entertainment, a typical denizen of the Ravenloft setting. In his review of the Monster Manual in the British magazine White Dwarf #8 (August/September 1978), Don Turnbull noted that the mummy was revised from its previous statistics, and could now cause paralysis on sight (as a result of fear).
Naga	191–193			Described are the dark naga, guardian naga, spirit naga, and water naga. Based on the nāga from Indian mythology.
Night hag	193–194			Powerful hag from Hades, propagating evil by creating larvae. Don Turnbull referred to the night hag as "splendid" and notes that the illustration of the night hag is the best drawing in the book. It has been described as comparable to the Alp of folklore, although "considered a more Judeo-Christian demonic influence".
Nightmare	194–195			Includes a description of the cauchemar, an advanced nightmare
Nightshade	195–197			Described are the nightcrawler, nightwalker, and nightwing
Nymph	197–198			Based on the nymph from Greek mythology, also an instance of the sexist tropes the game draws on which presented female sexuality as inherently dangerous. Appeared in the movie Futurama: Bender's Game.
Ogre	198–200			Includes a description of the ogre barbarian, an ogre 4th-level barbarian. Large, powerful humanoid creatures, with slightly below average intelligence. Typical bad guys in the game, who can be used to teach "players about fighting big, powerful, stupid monsters, which is an iconic D&D experience".
Ogre mage	200			
Ooze	201–203			Described are the black pudding, gelatinous cube, gray ooze, and ochre jelly. Includes a description of the elder black pudding, an advanced black pudding. "D&D's large variety of monstrous oozes and slimes took their original inspiration from Irvin S. Yeathworth Jr's The Blob" movie. In the artificial dungeon environment of the game, they function as a "clean up crew". The gelatinous cube, "a living mound of gelatinous jelly", was considered especially suited for that role, as it fit exactly in the standard grid for tactical combat. Considered an "iconic monster". Ian Livingstone considered the ochre jelly one of the game's more "exotic and strange creatures". SyFy Wire contributor Lisa Granshaw counted oozes among "The 9 Scariest, Most Unforgettable Monsters From Dungeons & Dragons" and found them "extremely disturbing because everything may seem fine one minute and then the next you're on the way to death." D&D's slimes have served as inspiration for appearances of this kind of monster in many video games.
Orc	203–204			Described are the orc and half-orc. Directly adapted from the orc in J.R.R. Tolkien's works. Considered one of the "five main "humanoid" races" in AD&D by Paul Karczag and Lawrence Schick. Presented as "evil" and "savage raiders" in the game.
Otyugh	204–205			Also known as gulguthra. Game designer Don Turnbull rated the otyugh as a "most interesting creation".
Owl, giant	205			
Owlbear	206			Newly created for the game early on inspired by a Hong Kong–made plastic toy, the owlbear was well-received as a useful and memorable monster.
Pegasus	206–207			Taken from greek mythology, an example of the diverse cultures amalgamated into D&D. Part of the game from its very beginning, a pegasus was already depicted in the playtest material from 1973 for the original edition.
Phantom fungus	207			
Phase spider	207–208			Arachnid as big as a medium-large dog that can shift between dimensions and bite with fangs of deadly poison.
Phasm	208			
Planetouched	209–210			Described are the aasimar and tiefling. Tieflings are descendants of a union between a human and a demon or devil; popular as player characters, as they allow for "identity tourism" of a racial outsider. Johnny L. Wilson called tieflings "the paranoid, loner obverse" of halflings, who "believe that life is out to get them". In the game they are "suited to be great thieves" and "point persons" due to favourable saving throw bonuses. Aasimar are Humanoids "descended from ethereal beings" from the Outer Planes, "charming creatures protecting the universe against evil". A.V. Club reviewer Nick Wanserski found them an interesting player character race "for the chance to be unequivocally good in a way that's difficult to embody in real life".
Pseudodragon	210–211			"a miniature dragon that also has a tail stinger" Reviewer Philippe Tessier found it "very nice" and interesting when made available as a familiar.
Purple worm	211			The "dread purple worm" attacks with both ends, maw and stinger. This "iconic monster" and original creation of Dungeons & Dragons is present all editions of the game.
Rakshasa	211–212			Based on the creature from Hindu mythology. Humanoid fiends with tigerlike-features, Reactor magazine commentator Saladin Ahmed rated them as "ultimate badass monsters". He found a depiction sitting with pipe and smoking-jacket fitting on second thought, as the creature is so powerful it has no need to prove its dangerousness.
Rast	213			
Ravid	213–214			
Remorhaz	214–215			
Roc	215			An enormous bird, based on a mythological creature probably of Persian origin, known from Sindbad the Sailor.
Roper	215–216			A dangerous inhabitant of the Underdark with "murderous behavior". One of the original creations for the game, Witwer et al. rated them among the "iconic D&D monsters".
Rust monster	216			An original invention for the game and its artificial underground world, the appearance of the rust monster was inspired by a plastic toy from Hong Kong. It was ranked among the most memorable as well as obnoxious creatures in the game, terrifying to certain characters and their players not due to their ability to fight but to destroy their items. Chris Sims of the on-line magazine Comics Alliance referred to the rust monster as "the most feared D&D monster".
Sahuagin	217–218			
Salamander	218–219			Described are the flamebrother salamander, average salamander, and noble salamander
Satyr	219–220			Based on the satyr from classical sources.
Sea cat	220–221			
Shadow	221–222			Includes a description of the greater shadow, an advanced shadow. In his review of the Monster Manual in the British magazine White Dwarf #8 (August/September 1978), Don Turnbull noted his disappointment that the shadow is of the undead class and thus subject to a cleric's turn undead ability. Turnbull commented, "I used to enjoy seeing clerics vainly trying to turn what wouldn't turn, when Shadows were first met". Rob Bricken of io9 identified the shadow as one of "The 12 Most Obnoxious Dungeons & Dragons Monsters".
Shadow mastiff	222			
Shambling mound	222–223			Ben Woodard considered its ability to move "the base creepiness of the creep".
Shield guardian	223–224			
Shocker lizard	224–225			
Skeleton	225–227			Template; sample skeletons include a 1st-level human warrior, a wolf, an owlbear, a troll, a chimera, an ettin, an advanced megaraptor, a cloud giant, and a young adult red dragon. The skeleton was ranked second among the ten best low-level monsters by the authors of Dungeons & Dragons For Dummies: "introduces players to the special advantages and weaknesses of undead monsters". They also thank Ray Harryhausen for people knowing what fighting skeletons ought to look like. Screen Rant ranked the tiny skeleton one of the weakest D&D creatures, saying "[skeletons] go all the way down to Tiny-sized creatures, which means that it is possible for your party of adventurers to fight a group of skeletons that are the same size as action figures."
Skum	228			
Slaad	228–231			Described are the red slaad, blue slaad, green slaad, gray slaad, and death slaad. Ed Greenwood considered the slaadi "worthy additions to any campaign". GameSpy author Allan Rausch described the slaadi as "remorseless reptilian killing machines", but "For many years, slaad were a joke -- because of their artwork", which showed them as "six-foot tall carnivorous frogs". With the Planescape setting they "were reinterpreted artistically to be less frog-like and much more fearsome". Shannon Applecline considered the githzerai one of the game's especially notable monsters.
Spectre	232			Inspired by Gothic fiction, a typical denizen of the Ravenloft setting.
Sphinx	232–234			Described are the androsphinx, criosphinx, gynosphinx, and hieracosphinx. Based on Egyptian and Classical mythology, an example of the diverse cultures amalgamated into D&D.
Spider eater	234			
Sprite	235–236			Described are the grig, nixie, and pixie
Stirge	236–237			Flying and blood-sucking creatures. "[P]esky" because while small they are dangerous to characters as a swarm. Present in the game since its earliest edition.
Swarm	237–240			Described are the bat swarm, centipede swarm, hellwasp swarm, locust swarm, rat swarm, and spider swarm
Tarrasque	240–241			Ranked among the strongest monsters in the game by Scott Baird from Screen Rant, "the ultimate challenge for many players". Rob Bricken from io9 named the tarrasque as the 10th most memorable D&D monster. The tarrasque appeared on the 2018 Screen Rant top list at No. 5 on " Dungeons & Dragons: The 20 Most Powerful Creatures, Ranked", and Scott Baird highlighted that "The tarrasque is currently the most powerful creature in the 5th edition of Dungeons & Dragons, where it is matched only by Tiamat in terms of its combat prowess."
Tendriculos	241–242			
Thoqqua	242			
Titan	242–243			Based on the powerful beings from Greek mythology. Ranked among the strongest creatures in the game by Scott Baird from Screen Rant, as they "stand above giants and possess even more power in terms of their physical and magical capabilities". Backstab reviewer Michaël Croitoriu thought them truly interesting for powergamers when made available as player characters.
Tojanida	243–244			Described are the juvenile, adult, and elder tojanida
Treant	244–245			Based on the Ent by J. R. R. Tolkien, and renamed due to copyright reasons.
Triton	245–246			An aquatic race based on the merman in Greek mythology.
Troglodyte	246–247			Based on the stock character of the primitive caveman, Gary Gygax portrayed the troglodyte in the game as more monstrous, with chaotic and evil behaviour, offensive smell and lizard-like characteristics. The troglodyte was among the monsters featured as trading cards on the back of Amurol Products candy figure boxes.
Troll	247–248			Described are the troll and scrag. Includes a description of the troll hunter, a troll 6th-level ranger. Tall green-skinned evil gaunt humanoids. A characteristic denizen of AD&D worlds. Their appearance and powerful regenerative ability is taken from Three Hearts and Three Lions by Poul Anderson rather than from their mythological or Tolkienesque counterparts. Considered one of the "five main "humanoid" races" in AD&D by Paul Karczag and Lawrence Schick.
Umber hulk	248–249			Includes a description of the truly horrid umber hulk, an advanced umber hulk. Present in the game since the earliest edition.
Unicorn	249–250			Includes a description of the celestial charger, a unicorn 7th-level cleric with the celestial creature template. Based on the creature from medieval bestiaries. The Dungeons & Dragons animated series featured Uni the unicorn as a well-received "mascot" and "cute animal sidekick".
Vampire	250–253			Template; sample vampires include a 5th-level human fighter, and a half-elf 9th-level monk/4th-level shadowdancer. Depiction is related to those in 1930s and 1940s Hollywood Dracula movies, as well as folklore and Gothic fiction; a typical denizen of the Ravenloft setting, and "classic" monster of the game.
Vampire spawn	253–254			
Vargouille	254–255			
Wight	255			Thin humanoid undead. Directly adapted from the barrow-wight in Tolkien's The Lord of the Rings, while the concept is inspired Icelandic sagas. Rob Bricken of io9 identified the wight as one of "The 12 Most Obnoxious Dungeons & Dragons Monsters".
Will-o'-wisp	255–256			
Winter wolf	256			
Worg	256–257			Worgs are giant wolves inspired by the wargs in the works of J.R.R. Tolkien; the name was changed for legal reasons, while both word an concept ultimately go back to Old Norse idea of varg, which can refer to wolves in their violent aspect.
Wraith	257–258			Includes a description of the dread wraith, an advanced wraith. Inspired by and renamed from the Nazgul from J.R.R. Tolkien's legendarium, as well as by Gothic fiction, a typical denizen of the Ravenloft setting.
Wyvern	259			Its tail is equipped with a poisonous tail stinger.
Xill	259–260			
Xorn	260–261			Described are the minor xorn, average xorn, and elder xorn
Yeth hound	260–262			
Yrthak	262			
Yuan-ti	262–265			Described are the yuan-ti pureblood, yuan-ti halfblood, and yuan-ti abomination. A species of "cult-like snake people" and among "D&D's most popular and iconic monsters". The original yuan-ti castes were the abominations, the halfbreeds, and the purebloods, which first appeared in the module Dwellers of the Forbidden City (1981), In the adventure, the characters are hired to find an object taken to a lost oriental-style city, which has been taken over by a cult of snake-worshipers, the yuan-ti, and their servants, the mongrelmen and tasloi. The types have been summarized by A.V. Club as "a human-eating snake, or human-snake hybrid eater of humans and snakes, or other human-snake hybrids." Snakes and snake-worship used in fiction have been criticized as characteristic of Orientalism. The publication history, digital and print, of yuan-ti falls into this pattern as they serve as uncomplicated antagonists in "exotic" settings. Graeme Barber, a game designer noted for his critique of racism in Dungeons & Dragons, used yuan-ti in his contribution to the book Candlekeep Mysteries. Controversy arose after Wizards of the Coast, according to Barber, altered his depiction of yuan-ti. Summarizing his critique of the simplistic portrayal, Barber wrote, "Yuan-ti are evil because evil." Keith Ammann, in his 2019 book The Monsters Know What They're Doing, commented of the yuan-ti purebloods that "Yuan-ti have had hundreds of generations to live and adapt on their own, so they'll have the same self-preservation instinct as any evolved species." TheGamer.com in April 2021 listed the yuan-ti pureblood as #2 on their list of "10 Most Underrated Races That Are Better Than You Think". CBR.com listed the yuan-ti pure blood as #5 on their list of "Top 10 Playable Species In D&D".
Zombie	265–267			Template; sample skeletons include a kobold, a human commoner, a troglodyte, a bugbear, an ogre, a minotaur, a wyvern, an umber hulk, and a gray render. Based on the zombie from folklore as well as more contemporary entertainment.
Ape	268			
Baboon	268			
Badger	268			
Bat	268–269			
Bear, black	269			
Bear, brown	269			
Bear, polar	269			
Bison	269–270			
Boar	270			
Camel	270			
Cat	270			
Cheetah	271			
Crocodile	271			
Crocodile, giant	271			
Dog	271–272			
Dog, riding	272			
Donkey	272			
Eagle	272			
Elephant	272–273			
Hawk	273			
Horse	273–274			Described are the heavy horse, light horse, heavy warhorse, and light warhorse
Hyena	274			
Leopard	274			
Lion	274–275			
Lizard	275			
Lizard, monitor	275			
Manta ray	275			
Monkey	276			
Mule	276			
Octopus	276			
Octopus, giant	276–277			
Owl	277			
Pony	277			
Pony, war	277–278			
Porpoise	278			
Rat	278			Example of a monster posing little threat to the characters in the game, suitable for play at lowest level.
Raven	278			
Rhinoceros	278–279			
Shark	279			Described are the medium, large, and huge shark
Snake	279–281			Described are the constrictor snake, giant constrictor snake, and viper snake (tiny, small, medium, large, and huge)
Squid	281			
Squid, giant	281			
Tiger	281–282			
Toad	282			
Weasel	282			
Whale	282–283			Described are the baleen whale, cachalot whale, and orca
Wolf	283			
Wolverine	283			
Giant ant	284			Described are the giant ant worker, giant ant soldier, and giant ant queen
Giant bee	284			
Giant bombardier beetle	284–285			
Giant fire beetle	285			
Giant stag beetle	285			
Giant praying mantis	285			
Giant wasp	285			
Monstrous centipede	286–287			Described are the tiny, small, medium, large, huge, gargantuan, and colossal monstrous centipede. Giant centipedes are "low-level monsters", one-foot long red many-legged creatures.
Monstrous scorpion	287–288			Described are the tiny, small, medium, large, huge, gargantuan, and colossal monstrous scorpion. Scorpions have the distinction of having been the very first combat encounter in the first playtest, run by Gary Gygax, of the original version of the game. Scorpion the size of a horse, its stinger carries a deadly poison.
Monstrous spider	288–289			Described are the tiny, small, medium, large, huge, gargantuan, and colossal monstrous spider

== WTC 17668 – Draconomicon (2003) ==
ISBN 0-7869-2884-0

Creature	Page	Other Appearances	Variants	Description
Dracolich	146			Ranked among the strongest monsters in the game by Scott Baird from Screen Rant. It was also one of the first new creatures introduced for the Forgotten Realms campaign setting.
Dracolich, Ancient Blue	147			
Dragon, Battle	176			
Dragon, Chaos	177			
Dragon, Ethereal	179			
Dragon, Faerie	158			
Dragon, Fang	159			
Dragon, Ghostly	161			
Dragon, Ghostly Adult Green	161			
Dragon, Howling	180			
Dragon, Oceanus	181			
Dragon, Planar	176			
Dragon, Pyroclastic	182			
Dragon, Radiant	185			
Dragon, Rust	186			
Dragon, Shadow	191			
Dragon, Skeletal	192			
Dragon, Skeletal Mature Adult Black	192			
Dragon, Styx	187			
Dragon, Tarterian	189			
Dragon, Vampiric	195			
Dragon, Vampiric Mature Adult Red	195			
Dragon, Zombie	197			
Dragon, Zombie Young Adult White	198			
Dragonkin	150			
Dragonnel	150			
Drake, Abyssal	145			
Drake, Air	152			
Drake, Earth	153			
Drake, Elemental	152			
Drake, Fire	154			
Drake, Ice	154			
Drake, Magma	155			
Drake, Ooze	156			
Drake, Smoke	157			
Drake, Storm	194			
Drake, Water	157			
Felldrake, Spiked	160			
Giant, Draconic Fire	149			
Dragon, Golem	163			
Golem, Dragonbone	164			
Golem, Drakestone	164			
Golem, Ironwyrm	165			
Half-dragon	167			
Hoard Scarab	167			
Landwyrm	168			
Landwyrm, Desert	169			
Landwyrm, Forest	170			
Landwyrm, Hill	170			
Landwyrm, Jungle	171			
Landwyrm, Mountain	172			
Landwyrm, Plains	172			
Landwyrm, Swamp	173			
Landwyrm, Tundra	174			
Landwyrm, Underdark	175			
Squamous Spewer	193			
Swarm, Hoard Scarab	168			

== WTC 17738 – Forgotten Realms – Lost Empires of Faerun (2005) ==
Lost Empires of Faerûn is a Forgotten Realms sourcebook about ancient empires. (p160-192) – ISBN 0-7869-3654-1

Creature	Page	Other Appearances	Variants	Description
Arachnids, Giant	160-162		Giant whip scorpion, giant whip spider, giant sun spider	
Baneguard	162-163		Direguard	Animated skeletons created by clerics of Bane
Crawling claw	163-164			Amputated hands given artificial magical life. Screen Rant ranked the crawling claw among the 10 weakest monsters in 2018: "At best, you can use a bunch of them to act as a distraction or as a screen while another villain prepares a spell or trap."
Curst	165-166			Undead under a curse that will not permit them to die. The curst had the distinction of being the first piece of publication with references to the immensely detailed Forgotten Realms setting.
Deepspawn	166-168			Underdark horror that spawns other monsters
Demon, ghour	168			Demons that serve Baphomet
Dread	169			Pair of skeletal arms created to serve as an undead guardian
Dread warrior	169-171			Undead created from skilled warriors
Flameskull	171-172			Undead guardians created from skulls of spellcasters
Foulwing	172			Misshapen predator with a toad-like body
Gorynych	172-173			Three-headed dragon-like monster
Greenbound creature	173-175			Template Creatures transformed into plant-like beings
Helmed horror	175-177		Battle horror	Self-willed magical construct appearing like an animated suit of armor
Ixzan	177-178			Mutated cousins of the ixitxachtil that live in the Underdark
Lycanthrope	178-183		Drow werebat, werecat, werecrocodile, wereshark	Weresharks were created by Dr. John Eric Holmes, based on a Hawaiian legend of the shark man.
Metalmaster	184			Sword slug, underground predator with magnetic powers
Nightshade, nighthaunt	185-186			Malicious creature of darkness, smallest of the nightshades
Nishruu	186-187			Misty creatures from another plane that eat magic
Phaerimm	187-189			Evil magicians with conical bodies
Tomb tapper	189-190			Ebony giant constructs created in ancient Netheril
Tressym	191			Highly intelligent winged cats
Velvet worm, giant	191-192			Massive wormlike creature that shoots strands of glue

== WTC 17739 – Sandstorm (2005) ==
Sandstorm: Mastering the Perils of Fire and Sand was published in 2005, and written by Bruce R. Cordell, Jennifer Clarke Wilkes, and JD Wiker. Sandstorm is an official supplement for the 3.5 edition of Dungeons and Dragons, and includes new content for desert based climate campaigns. The book contains both new playable races and monsters in addition to expanded rules and campaign ideas regarding wastelands and desert environments.

ISBN 0-7869-3655-X

Creature	Page	Other Appearances	Variants	Description
Ashen husk	137–138			The ashen husk is an undead. They are the animated corpses of those who died of thirst and dehydration while in the desert (contrary to being labelled as animated corpses, however, they are not zombies).
Asherati	139			
Ashworm	140			
Bhuka	141			
Camelopardel	141–142			
Chekryyan	142–143			
Crawling Apocalypse	143–144			
Crucian	144–145			
Cursed Cold One (Gelun)	145–146			The gelun is a creature that has to live in the desert to avoid completely freezing over into a block of ice.
Desert Devil (Araton)	147			
Dinosaur	147–149		Described are the diprotodon and the protoceratops	
Dire Animal	149–153		Described are the dire hippopotamus, dire jackal, dire puma, dire tortoise, and dire vulture.	
Dragon, Sand	152–155			
Dry Lich	155–157			Template; sample dry lich is a 5th-level asherati cleric/10th-level walker in the waste
Dune Hag	158			
Dunewinder	159–160			
Dustblight	160			
Dustform Creature	161–162			Template; sample dustform creature is a giant banded lizard
Dust Twister	162–163			
Forlorn Husk	163–164			
Giant Banded Lizard	164			
Half-Janni	164–166			Template; sample half-janni is a 5th-level human fighter
Ironthorn	166–167			
Lycanthrope, Werecrocodile	167–168			
Marruspawn	168–173		Described are the Marrulurk, Marrusault, and Marrutact	
Marruspawn Abomination	173–175			
Mephit	175–176		Described are the glass mephit and the sulphur mephit.	
Mirage Mullah	177			Template; sample mirage mullah is a 5th-level human fighter
Ooze	178–179		Described are the brine ooze and lava ooze	
Porcupine Cactus	179–180			
Saguaro Sentinel	181			
Sand Golem	182–183			
Sand Hunter	183–184			
Scarab Swarm, Death	184–185			
Scorpion Swarm	185			
Sphinx	186–189		Described are the canisphinx, crocosphinx, saurosphinx, and threskisphinx	
Thunderbird	189			
Troll, Wasteland	190			
Tumbling Mound	191			
Waste Crawler (Anhydrut)	191–192			
Animals	192–195		Described are the camel (dromedary camel, two-humped camel, and war camel), hippopotamus, horned lizard, jackal, serval (savannah wildcat), and vulture	
Vermin	195–198		Described are the brine swimmer, giant ant lion, and giant termite (worker termite, soldier termite, and queen termite)	

== WTC 17741 – Lords of Madness (2005) ==
Lords of Madness: The Book of Aberrations was published in 2005, and written by Richard Baker, James Jacobs, and Steve Winter. Lords of Madness is an official supplement for the 3.5 edition of Dungeons and Dragons, and includes new content for aberrations. The book contains a chapter on each of six types of monsters, some of which also feature statistics for that particular monster and/or its variants. In Chapter 8, statistics are given for new monsters, on pages 135–172.

ISBN 0-7869-3657-6

Creature	Page	Other Appearances	Variants	Description
Neogi	89–92		Adult neogi, neogi spawn, and the great old master	
Grell	107–109		Grell and grell philosopher	"terrifying beaked, tentacled monsters that populate the realm of Underdark". Tyler Linn of Cracked.com listed the grell among the "15 Most Idiotic Monsters In Dungeons & Dragons History" and found that it's movement by floating contributed to it looking ridiculous.
Tsochar	121–123			Fearsome invaders from a distant realm, the tsochari are a race of monstrous imposters, creatures that can steal the bodies of their victims and pass unnoticed in humanoid society.
Beholderkin	135–141		Hive mother, director, eye of the deep, overseer, and spectator	
Cildabrin	141–142			
Cloaker, shadowcloak elder	142–144			
Elder brain	144–146			A version of a brain in a jar, it was ranked among the strongest monsters in the game by Scott Baird from Screen Rant.
Elder eidolon	146–148			
Gas spore	148–149			
Gibbering mouther	150–151			
Half-farspawn	151–153			Template; sample creature is a half-farspawn gray render
Hound of the gloom	153–154			
Illithidae	154–157		Embrac, kigrid, and saltor	
Mind flayer, alhoon	157–158			The alhoon is described as even more powerful than other illithids because it has developed "powerful sorcery to augment their already fearsome psionic powers".
Mind flayer, Ulitharid	158–159			
Mind flayer, vampire	160–161			
Pseudonatural creature	161–162			Template; sample creature is a pseudonatural hippogriff
Psurlon	162–165		Average psurlon, elder psurlon, and giant psurlon	
Shaboath	166			
Shadow creature	167–168			Template; sample creature is a shadow choker
Silthilar	168–170			
Urophion	170–171	The Illithiad (1998)		Cross between roper and illithid that looks like a rocky outcropping and has hidden tentacles.
Zeugalak	171–172			

== WTC 17758 – Frostburn (2004) ==
Frostburn: Mastering the Perils of Ice and Snow was published in 2004, and written by Wolfgang Baur, James Jacobs, and George Strayton. Frostburn is an official supplement for the 3.5 edition of Dungeons and Dragons, and includes new content for cold based climate campaigns. The book contains both new playable races and monsters in addition to expanded rules and campaign ideas regarding; High altitude, arctic, and Cold environments in general.

ISBN 0-7869-3657-6

Creature	Page	Other Appearances	Variants	Description
Human	33–34		Seafarer, Everfrost barbarian, Icefolk, Mountain folk	
Dwarves	34, 122–124		Glacier Dwarves, Midgard Dwarves	
Elves	34–35		Snow Elves	
Gnomes	35		Ice Gnomes	
Halflings	36		Tundra Halflings	
Neanderthals	36–37, 145–146			
Uldras	38–40, 158–159			
Branta	113–114			Cold Subtype
Chilblain	114–115			
Dire Animal	115–121		Dire Polar Bear, Glyptodon, Megaloceros, Smilodon (Saber-Toothed Tiger), Woolly Mammoth, Zeuglodon	
Domovoi	121–122			Fire subtype
Elemental Weird	153–154		Ice Weird, Snow Weird	
Entombed	128–129			
Frost Folk	130–131			
Qorrashi Genie	131,132			
Frostfell Ghost	132–133			
Giant, Frost	133–136		Frost Giant Mauler, Frost Giant Spiritspeaker, Frost Giant Tundra Scout,	
Goblin, Snow	136–137			
Golem, Ice	137–138			
Ice Beast	138–140			Template; sample creature is an Ice Beast Gargoyle
Ice Toad	140–141			
Icegaunt	141–142			
Malasynep	142–143		Malasynep Mindmage	
Marzanna	33–34			
Orc	146–147		Snow Shaman Orc	
Pudding, White	147–148			
Raven, Giant	148–149			
Rimfire Eidolon	149–150			
Rusalka	151			
Shivhad	152–153			
Snowcloak	153–154			
Spider, Snow	154–155		Small Snow Spider, Medium Snow Spider, Large Snow Spider	
Spirit Animal	155–157			Template; sample creature is a Spirit Wolf
Tlalusk	157–158			Fire subtype
Urskan	159–160			
Vodyanoi	160–161			
Winterspawn	161–162			
Yeti	162–163		Abominable Yeti	
Yuki-On-Na	164			
Animal, Arctic	164–166		Caribou, Arctic Fox, Sea Otter, Penguin, Seal, Walrus	

(p113-166) – ISBN 0-7869-2896-4

== WTC 17867 – Stormwrack (2005) ==
Stormwrack is a sourcebook about watery environments. (p135-170)

Creature	Page	Other Appearances	Variants	Description
Amphibious creature	135-136			Template Landbound humanoid born able to survive in water
Anguillian	136-137			Aquatic hunters that inhabit cold seas. Tyler Linn of Cracked.com identified the anguillian as one of the "15 Most Idiotic Monsters In Dungeons & Dragons History", commenting that "Judging by the spear and the Sarlacc mouth, things down there aren't quite as whimsical as Sebastian the crab would have us believe." He adds: "Buddy, you've got a mouth lined with thousands of razor-sharp teeth and huge terrifying crab claws for hands. You do not need to try to jab people with a sharpened stick."
Aventi	138-139			Aquatic humanoids that were once human
Blackskate	139-140			Undead made up pieces of creatures that settled on the ocean floor
Caller from the deeps	140-141			Inky black creature formed from the cold water of ocean trenches
Crab, monstrous	141-143		Small monstrous crab, medium monstrous crab, large monstrous crab, huge monstrous crab, gargantuan monstrous crab, colossal monstrous crab	
Darfellan	143-144			Humanoids descended from orca lycanthropes
Dinosaur	144-147		Archelon, ichthyosaur, mosasaur, plesiosaur,	
Dire animal	147-148		Dire barracuda, dire eel	
Elf, aquatic	148-150			
Golem, coral	150-151			Construct made from sharp coral
Hadozee	151-152		Hadozee first mate	Simian humanoid wandered who often work as sailors. Critically described by Aaron Trammell as "a simian race of humanoids reminiscent of old minstrel shows", subject of criticism when translated into 5th edition.
Hammerclaw	152-153			Lobster-like creature with a deadly sonic bolt
Hippocampus	153-154			Horses of the sea. "Depicted as the front half of a horse and the rear half of a fish or sea-serpent." Tyler Linn of Cracked.com listed it among the "15 Most Idiotic Monsters In Dungeons & Dragons History". He did not think "it would pose much of a threat" and "was intended to be one of the good guys", but found the depiction "douchey".
Leech, giant	154-155			
Nereid	155-156			Aquatic fey native to the Elemental Plane of Water
Ramfish	156-157			Massive fish with a heavily armored head
Scyllan	157-158			Fiendish sea monsters
Seawolf	158-159			Shapechanger with a form that is part seal and part wolf
Sisiutl	159-160			Mysterious creatures that guard portals to other planes
Swarm	160-163		Jellyfish swarm, leech swarm, piranha swarm	
Uchuulon (slime chuul)	163-164			Chuul implanted with an illithid tadpole
Yugoloth, echinoloth	164-165			Fiends with the features of starfish and squid
Animals	165-169		Albatross, barracuda, eel, otter, sea lion, seal, snapping turtle, stingray	
Vermin and animals, water-adapted	169-170		Diving spider, monstrous; sean snake	

== WTC 17920 – Planar Handbook (2004) ==
Planar Handbook is a supplement which updates material about the Planes. (p107-134) – ISBN 0-7869-3429-8

Creature	Page	Other Appearances	Variants	Description
Anarchic creature	107-109			Template Creatures dwelling in the chaotic planes
Astral kraken	109-110			Prey on traveler to the astral plane
Axiomatic creature	110-111			Template Creatures dwelling in the lawful planes
Dharculus	112-113			Uses its mawed tentacles to feed on creatures in corporal planes
Dwarf, frost	113-114			Former duergar brought to the Ice Wastes of the Abyss millennia ago
Elementite swarm	114-117		Air elementite swarm, earth elementite swarm, fire elementite swarm, water elementite swarm	Premature forms of Elementals
Elsewhale	117-118			Magical whales living in the wild oceans of the multiverse
Elysian thrush	118-119			Songbird that contributes to the joy and contentment of Elysium
Energon	119-122		Xac-yel, xac-yij, xap-yaup, xong-yong, and xor-yost	
Entropic creature	122-124			Template Creatures dwelling on the Negative Energy Plane
Gaspar	124-125			Herd animals that live on the Beastlands
Gnome, fire	125-126			Gnomes that live where Bytopia connects to the Elemental Plane of Fire
Limbo stalker	126-127			Predators that attack slaadi
Nightmare, lesser	127-128			
Pack fiend	128-129			Former hunting beasts that now roam the Gray Waste of Hades
Shadow jelly	129-130			Creature made of shadow-stuff that feeds on life and light
Unraveler	130			Elemental spirits also known as menglis
Ur'epona	130-131			Horse-like creatures that move from plane to plane
Vivacious creature	131-133			Template Creatures dwelling on the Positive Energy Plane
Void ooze	133-134			Ooze that can drain energy from living creatures

== WTC 17921 – Monster Manual III (2004) ==
Monster Manual III mostly introduces new monsters, and includes some monsters from earlier editions to the 3.5 edition. ISBN 0-7869-3430-1

Creature	Page	Other Appearances	Variants	Description
Ambush drake	8			
Arcane ooze	9			
Armand	10-11		Armand warden	
Astral stalker	12			
Avalancher	13			
Battlebriar	14-15		Warbound impaler (lesser battlebriar)	
Bearhound	16			
Boneclaw	17			
Bonedrinker	18-19			
Brood keeper	20-21		Brood kepper larva swarm	
Cadaver collector	22-23		Greater cadaver collector	Bleeding Cool called the cadaver collector "nightmare fuel".
Changeling	24-25		Changeling spy	
Charnel hound	26			
Chelicera	27			
Chraal	28			
Cinder swarm	29			
Conflagration ooze	30-31		Infernal conflagration ooze	
Deathstrieker	32-33		Advanced deathshrieker	
Demon, arrow	34-35			
Demon, sorrowsworn	36-37			
Dinosaur, battletitan	38			
Dinosaur, bloodstriker	39-40			
Dinosaur, fleshraker	40-41			
Dinosaur, swindlespitter	41			
Dracotaur	42-43		Dracotaur rager	
Dragon eel	44			
Dragon blossom swarm	45			
Drowned	46			
Dust wight	47			
Elemental storm	48-49		Storm elemental, small; storm elemental, medium; storm elemental, large; storm elemental, huge; storm elemental, greater; storm elemental, elder	
Ephemreal swarm	50			
Feral yowler	51			
Geriviar	52-53			
Giant, death	54-55			
Giant, eldritch	56-57		Eldritch giant confessor	
Giant, sand	58-59		Sand giant champion	
Glaistig	60-61		Glaistig mindbender	
Gnoll, flind	62			
Goatfolk (ibixian)	63			Like a satyr, or a bariaur, the ibixian is a humanoid goat, but unlike the satyr and bariaur, both of which only have the lower torso of a goat, the ibixian is fully goat-like, with the humanoid traits only being the larger size, biped form, and human-like build.
Goblin, forestkith	64-65		Forestkith goblin barbarian	
Golem	66-74		Alchemical golem, gloom golem, hangman golem, mud golem, prismatic golem, shadesteel golem, web golem	
Grimweird	75			
Grisgol	76-77			The grisgol is a construct, a haphazard mess of old parchment, scrolls, staffs, scientific equipment, treasure, old clothing, artifacts, trinkets, and other such paraphernalia which one would expect to find in a wizard's laboratory, pieced together into a humanoid, mummy-like being, and animated by a phylactery.
Gulgar	78-79			
Harpoon spider	80-81		Dread harpoon spider	
Harssaf	82-83			
Ironclad mauler	84			
Jusitcator	85			
Kenku	86-87		Kenku sneak	Crow-like humanoids with a tendency for thievery, loosely based on the Japanese tengu.
Knell beetle	88-89		:Lesser kneel beetle	The knell beetle is a nine-foot long flesh-eating insect that can create a blast of sound from its head.
Lhosk	90			
Living spell	91-94		Chilling fog, glitterfire, living blasphemy, sickening sleep	
Lizardfolk, blackscale	95			
Lizardfolk, poison dusk	96-97		Poison dusk lieutenant	
Lumi	98-99		Lumi crusader	
Lurking strangler	100			
Mastodon	101			
Mindshredder	102-105		Mindshredder warrior, mindshredder zenthal	
Mivilorn	106-107		Elite demon war mount	
Necronaut	108			
Needletooth swarm	109			
Night twist	110-111		Ancient night twist	
Nycter	112-113		Nycter defender of the cave	
Odopi	114-115		Elder odopi	
Ogre, skullcrusher	116-117		Skullcrusher ogre sergeant	
Omnimental	118			
Otyugh, lifeleech	119			
Petal	120			
Phoelarch	121-123		Phoera	
Plague brush	124			
Plague spewer	125			
Protean scourge	126-127		Protean scourge arcanist	
Quaraphon	128-129		Quaraphon bully	
Rage drake	130-131		Fiendish rage drake	
Ragewalker	132-133			
Rakshasa, Ak'chazar	134-135			
Rakshasa, Naztahrune	136-137			
Redcap	138-139		Young redcap, elder redcap	
Rejkar	140			
Roper, prismatic	141			
Rot reaver	142-144		Necrothane	
Runehound	145			
Salt mummy	146			
Sea tiger	147			
Seyrulin	148-149		Greater seyrulin	The seryulins resemble enormous, green sea slugs. They are segmented, have two eyes on snail-like eye stalks, and lines of short, fuzzy hair going down their sides, top and underside.
Shifter	150-151			
Shimmerling swarm	152			
Shredstorm	153			
Shrieking terror	154-155		Five-headed terror, ten-headed terror	
Siege crab	156-157		Greater siege crab	
Skindancer	158			
Slaughterstone behemoth	159			
Slaughterstone eviscerator	160			
Snowflake ooze	161			
Spellwarped creature	162-163			
Splinterwaif	164-165		Splinterwaif knave	
Ssvaklor	166-167		Greater ssvaklor	
Stonesinger	168			
Summoning ooze	169			
Susurrus	170			
Swamp strider storm	171			
Thorn	172			
Topiary guardian	173-175		Boar topiary guardian, lion topiary guardian, triceratops topiary guardian	
Trilloch	176			
Troll, cave	177			
Troll, crystalline	178			
Troll, forest	179			
Troll, mountain	180			
Troll, war	181			
Vasuthant	182-183		Horrific vasuthant	
Vermin lord	184-185			
Visilight	186			
Voidmind creature	187-189			Template
Warforged	190-193		Warforged charger, warforged scout	
Witchknife	194-195		Witchknife captain	
Wood woad	196			
Woodling	197-199			Template
Yugoloth, canoloth	200			
Yugoloth, mezzoloth	201			
Yugoloth, nycanolth	202-203		Nycaloth commander	
Yugoloth, ultroloth	204			
Zezir	205			

== WTC 17924 – Libris Mortis – The Book of Undead (2004) ==
Libris Mortis is a sourcebook focusing on the undead. (p81-132) – ISBN 0-7869-3433-6

Creature	Page	Other Appearances	Variants	Description
Angel of decay	83-84			
Atropial scion	84-85			
Blaspheme	85-86			
Bleakborn	86-87			
Blood amniote	87-88			
Bloodmote cloud	88			
Bone rat swarm	88-89			
Boneyard	89-90			
Brain in a jar	90-91	Open Grave (2009)		Tyler Linn of Cracked.com identified the brain-in-a-jar as one of "15 Idiotic Dungeons and Dragons Monsters" in 2009, stating: "...It's a brain in a jar. Fuck, just kick it over, who's going to know?"
Carcass eater	91			
Cinderspawn	91-92			
Corpse rat swarm	92-93			
Crypt chanter	93-94			
Deathlock	94			
Dessicator	94-95			
Dire maggot	95-96			
Dream vestige	96-97			
Entomber	97-98			
Entropic reaper	98-99			
Evolved undead	99-100			Template
Forsaken shell	100-101			
Ghost brute	101-103			Template
Gravetouched ghoul	103-105			Template
Grave dirt golem	105-106			
Half-vampire	106-108			Template
Hooded pupil	108-109			Template
Hulking corpse	109-110			
Mummified creature	110-112			Template
Murk	112			
Necromental	112-114			Template
Necropolitan	114-115			
Plague blight	115-116			
Quell	116-117			
Raiment	117			
Revived fossil	118-119			Template
Skin kite	119-120			
Skirr	120			
Skulking cyst	120-121			
Slaughter wight	121-122			
Slaymate	122-123			
Spectral lyrist	123			
Swarm-shifter	123-127		Swarm of undead bats, swarm of undead beetles, swarm of undead centipedes, swarm of undead flies, swarm of undead leeches, swarm of undead maggots (or worms), swarm of undead parts, swarm of undead rats, swarm of undead sand, swarm of undead scorpions, swarm of undead spiders	Template
Tomb mote	128			
Umbral creature	128-130			Template
Visage	130-131			
Voidwraith	131-132			
Wheep	132			

== WTC 86400 – Eberron Campaign Setting ==
Eberron Campaign Setting introduced the Eberron setting, and creatures from the setting. (p275-303) – ISBN 0-7869-3274-0

Creature	Page	Other Appearances	Variants	Description
Ascendant councilor	276-277			
Carcass crab	277			
Daelkyr	278-279			
Dinosaur	279-281		Clawfoot, Fastieth, Glidewing,	
Dolgaunt	281-282		Dolgaunt monk	
Dolgrim	282-283			
Hag, dusk	284			
Homonculus	284-287		Dedicated wright, expeditious messenger, furtive filcher, iron defender	
Horrid animal	287-289			Template
Horse, Valenar riding	289			
Inspired	290-292			
Karrnathi skeleton	292			
Karrnathi zombie	292-293			
Living spell	293-295		Living burning hands, living cloudkill	Template
Magebred animal	295-296			Template
Quori	296-297		Tuscora quori	
Rakshasa, zakya	297-298			
Symbiont	298-299		Living breastplate	
Tentacle whip	300			
Tongueworm	300-301			
Undying councilor	301-302			
Undying soldier	302			
Warforged titan	302-303			

== WTC 88026 – Book of Exalted Deeds (2003) ==
Book of Exalted Deeds is a sourcebook focused on the forces of good. (p157-191)

Creature	Page	Other Appearances	Variants	Description
Aleax	158-159		Template.	
Archon	159-164		Owl archon, sword archon, throne archon, warden archon	
Asura	164-165			
Bariaur	165-167		Bariaur defender of Ysgard	Reviewer Johnny L. Wilson found they fill a similar niche than dwarves. They are "fierce fighters and congenial sojourners – as long as you don't serve meat or befriend any giants".
Crypt warden	167-168			
Eladrin	168-172		Coure, firre, shiradi, tulani	Celestials from the Outer Planes, "charming creatures protecting the universe against evil".
Guardinal	172-175		Equinal, musteval, ursinal	Powerful neutral good celestials from Elysium, each a humanoid with some animalistic characteristics. Arcane magazine cites the culture of the guardinals as helping "give the Planes a solid base of peoples".
Hollyphant	176-177			In a review of Planescape Monstrous Compendium Appendix II for Arcane magazine, the reviewer described hollyphants as "mutant killer elephants with wings" and felt that they were introduced to "ensure that the planes maintain their very necessary bizarre flavour".
Leskylor	177-179		Three-headed leskylor	
Moon dog	179-180			
Quesar	180-181			
Rhek	181-182		Rhek chaosgrinder	The Rhek is an extraplanar monstrous humanoid; resembling a human crossed with a rhinoceros, they dwell on the plane of Arcadia and strive to achieve peace, harmony and perfection throughout the multiverse.
Sacred watcher	182-184			
Saint	184-186			Template.
Sanctified creature	186-187			Template.
Swarm, divine wrath	188-190		Apocalypse frog swarm, bronze locust swarm, deathraven swarm, sunfly swarm	

== WTC 17925 – Complete Arcane (2004) ==
Complete Arcane is a sourcebook which focuses on spellcasting characters. (p151-162) – ISBN 0-7869-3435-2

Creature	Page	Other Appearances	Variants	Description
Effigy creature	151-153			Template.
Elemental grue	153-156		Chaggrin (earth grue), harginn (fire grue), ildriss (air grue), vardigg (water grue)	White Dwarf reviewer Megan C. Evans referred to the grues as "a collection of terrifying beasties from the Elemental Planes".
Elemental monolith	156-160		Air monolith, earth monolith, fire monolith, water monolith	
Pseudonatural creature	160-161			Template.
Spellstitched	161-162			Template.

== WTC 88268 – Expanded Psionics Handbook (2004) ==
Expanded Psionics Handbook is a sourcebook that explores psionics. (p185-218) – ISBN 0-7869-3301-1

Creature	Page	Other Appearances	Variants	Description
Aboleth, psionic	185			
Astral construct	185-189			Template.
Blue	189-190			
Brain mole	190-191			
Caller in darkness	191-192			
Cerebrilith	192-193			
Couatl, psionic	193-194			
Crysmal	194			
Dromite	194-195			Dromites are small monstrous humanoids with natural psionic ability.
Duergar, psionic	195-196			
Elan	196-197			
Folugub	197-198			
Githyanki, psionic	198-199			
Githzerai, psionic	199			
Gray glutton	200			It is a terrifying predator that lives only to eradicate psionic creatures and characters.
Half-giant	200-201			
Intellect devourer	202-203			SyFy Wire in 2018 called it one of "The 9 Scariest, Most Unforgettable Monsters From Dungeons & Dragons", saying that "The idea of having your brain consumed and just becoming an evil puppet is truly terrible."
Maenad	203-204			
Mind flayer, psionic	204			
Neothelid	204-205			
Phrenic creature	205-206			Template.
Phthisic	206-207			
Psicrystal	207-208			
Psion-killer	208-209			
Puppeteer	209			
Puppeteer, flesh harrower	210			
Temporal filcher	210-211			
Thought eater	211-212			
Thought slayer	212-213			
Thri-kreen	213-214			"Praying mantis man" with four arms and a poisonous bite, "invented by Paul Reiche III for the AD&D Monster Cards Set 2 (1982)", reviewer Mark Theurer considered them an "old personal favorite". With their additional limbs and specialized chatkcha and gythka weapons, thri-kreen were infamous as player characters optimized to do extreme amounts of damage. J.R. Zambrano found them "an interesting race" and preferred their "2nd Edition aesthetic" to others.
Udoroot	214-215			
Unbodied	215-216			
Xeph	217			
Yuan-ti, psionic	217-218			

== WTC 88578 – Races of Faerun (2003) ==
Races of Faerûn is a sourcebook which details the Forgotten Realms humanoids races. (p174-178) – ISBN 0-7869-2875-1

Creature	Page	Other Appearances	Variants	Description
Animal	174		Hound, mastiff; ibis, lynx	
Cavvekan	175			
Deathfang	175-176			
Osquip	176-177			
Snake, flying	177			
Steeder	177-178			

== WTC 88581 – Forgotten Realms – Underdark (2003) ==
Underdark as a sourcebook detailing the Underdark in the Forgotten Realms. (p78-99) – ISBN 0-7869-3053-5

Creature	Page	Other Appearances	Variants	Description
All-consuming hunger	78-79			
Annihilator	79-80			
Arachnoid creature	80-82			Template.
Baphitaur	82-83			
Chameleon creature	83-84			Template.
Earth glider	84			
Elder brain	84-86			A version of a brain in a jar, it was ranked among the strongest monsters in the game by Scott Baird from Screen Rant.
Faerzress-infused creature	86-87			Template.
Giant cockroach	87-88			
Giant maggot	88			
Gloura	88-89			
Half-illithid	89-91			Template.
Ineffable horror	91-92			
Kuo-toa leviathan	92-93			
Lith	93-94			
Lurker	94			An original creation for the game's artificial underground environment, this monster was designed as a trap for unwary player characters; the trapper camouflages as a piece of floor, engulfing a victim stepping on it. Rob Bricken of io9 identified the lurker and the trapper as two of "The 12 Most Obnoxious Dungeons & Dragons Monsters".
Maur (hunched giant)	95-96			
Mineral warrior	96-97			Template.
Phaerlock	97-98			
Portal drake	98-99			
Stone flyer	99			

== WTC 96566 – Forgotten Realms – Serpent Kingdoms (2004) ==
Serpent Kingdoms is a sourcebook about intelligent reptilian creatures in the Forgotten Realms. (p62-91) – ISBN 0-7869-3277-5

Creature	Page	Other Appearances	Variants	Description
Amphisbaena	62-63			
Deathcoils	63-64			
Dinosaur	64-66		Ceratosaur, pteranadon, stegosaurus	
Jaculi	66-68			
Lizard king/queen	68-69			
Lycanthrope, wereserpent	69-70			
Mlaurraun	70-71			
Muckdweller	71-72			
Naga	72-79		Banelar naga, bone naga (template), Faerûn ha-naga, iridescent naga, nagahydra	
Nifern	79			
Sarrukh (progenitor race)	80-81			The sarrukh are reptilian humanoids, and one of the five progenitor races, or Creator Races, of Faerûn.
Serpentflesh golem	81-83			
Snakes	83-87		Dung snake, glacier snake, reed snake, sewerm, tree python, whipsnake	
Tren	87-88			
Yuan-ti holy guardian	88-90			
Yuan-ti mageslayer	90-91			

== WTC 96582 – Miniatures Handbook (2003) ==
Miniatures Handbook is a sourcebook focusing on play with miniature figures. (p45-72) – ISBN 0-7869-3281-3

Creature	Page	Other Appearances	Variants	Description
Abyssal eviscerator	45-46			
Aspect	46-55		Aspect of Asmodeus, aspect of Bahamut, aspect of Demogorgon, aspect of Hextor, aspect of Kord, aspect of Lolth, aspect of Mephistopheles, aspect of Nerull, aspect of Orcus, aspect of Tiamat, aspect of Vecna	
Bright naga	55-56			
Catfolk	56-57			
Cave dinosaurs	57-59		Cave ankylosaurus, cave triceratops, cave tyrannosaurus	
Crucian	59			
Cursed spirit	60			
Displacer serpent	60-61			The displacer serpent is a magical beast akin to an ophidian version of the displacer beast.
Equiceph	61-62			
Gravehound	62			
Kruthik	62-64		Hatchling kruthik, adult kruthik, greater kruthik	
Mad slasher	64			
Magma hurler	65			
Nothic	65			
Phargion	66			
Protectar	66-67			
Ramadeen	67-68			
Scaled stalker	68			
Shadow beast	68-70		Ghirrash, khumat, thaskor	
Spark lasher	70-71			
Stonechild	71-72			
Walking wall	72			

== WTC 8857972 – Magic of Incarnum (2005) ==
Magic of Incarnum is a sourcebook in which a new source of power, incarnum, is explored. (p169-198) – ISBN 0-7869-3701-7

Creature	Page	Other Appearances	Variants	Description
Azurin	170-172		Azurin warrior, azurin cleric, azurin soulborn	
Dissolution ooze	172			
Dragon, incarnum	172-175			
Duskling	175-177		Duskling warrior, duskling barbarian, duskling totemist	
Giant, totem	177-179			
Incarnum golem	179-180			
Incarnum wraith	180-181			
Lost	181-184			Template.
Midnight construct	184-186		Midnight construct, lesser; midnight construct; midnight construct, greater	
Necrocarnum zombie	186-189			Template.
Rilkan	189-191		Rilkan warrior, rilkan rogue, rilkan incarnate	
Skarn	191-193		Skarn warrior, skarn monk, skarn incarnate	
Souleater	194-195			
Soulfused construct	195-197			Template.
Soulspark	197-198		Least soulspark, lesser soulspark, soulspark, greater soulspark	

== WTC 9536500 – Tome of Magic (2006) ==
Tome of Magic is a sourcebook which focuses on new options for magic. (p80-89, 158–166, 264–270) – ISBN 0-7869-3909-5

Creature	Page	Other Appearances	Variants	Description
Deadly dancer	80-81			
Deathshead	81-82			
Horned beast	82-84			
Karsite	84-86			
Roving mauler	86-87			The roving mauler is a five-foot tall creature with one lion leg on each of the five points of its body, and a lion head on either side of its body.
Swarm, murder of crows	87-88			
Tooth beast	88-89			
Dark creature	158-161			Template.
Ephemeral, hangman	161-162			
Genie, khayal	162-163			
Shadow elemental	164-166		Shadow elemental, small; shadow elemental, medium; shadow elemental, large; shadow elemental, huge; shadow elemental, greater; shadow elemental, elder	
Archon, word	264-265			
Devil, logokron	265-266			
Garbler	267			
Loquasphinx	268-269			
Painspeaker	269-270			

== WTC 9537572 – Fiendish Codex I: Hordes of the Abyss (2006) ==
Fiendish Codex I: Hordes of the Abyss was published in 2006, and was written by Ed Stark, James Jacobs, and Erik Mona. Fiendish Codex I is an official supplement for the 3.5 edition of Dungeons and Dragons, and includes new content for demons and inhabitants of the Abyss. Chapter 2 contains statistics for new monsters, on pages 27–56, while Chapter 3 contains statistics for 14 demon lords, on pages 57–80.

ISBN 0-7869-3919-2

Creature	Page	Other Appearances	Variants	Description
Armanite	28–29			
Bar-lgura	29–31	Monster Manual II, Book of Vile Darkness		
Broodswarm	31–32			
Bulezau	33–34			
Chasme	34–35	Monster Manual II, Book of Vile Darkness		
Dybbuk	36–37			
Ekolid	38–39			
Goristro	40–41			
Guecubu	41–43			
Lilitu	43–45			
Mane	45–46	Monster Manual, Book of Vile Darkness		
Molydeus	46–48			
Nabassu	48–51	Monster Manual II		Described are the juvenile nabassu and mature nabassu
Rutterkin	51–52	Monster Manual II, Book of Vile Darkness		
Sibriex	52–54			SyFy Wire in 2018 called it one of "The 9 Scariest, Most Unforgettable Monsters From Dungeons & Dragons", saying that "The sibriex is an extremely intelligent horrifying creature that looks as disgusting and dreadful as it actually is."
Yochlol	54–56			
Baphomet	58–59	Monster Manual II		The demon lord of minotaurs
Dagon	59–61			Obyrith demon lord of water, sea-dwelling creatures, and secrets
Demogorgon	61–63	Eldritch Wizardry, Monster Manual, Book of Vile Darkness		Inspired by its real-world mythological counterpart.
Fraz-Urb'luu	63–65	Monster Manual II		
Graz'zt	65–66	Monster Manual II, Book of Vile Darkness		
Juiblex	66–68	Monster Manual, Book of Vile Darkness		
Kostchtchie	68–69	Monster Manual II		
Malcanthet	69–71			
Obox-ob	71–73			
Orcus	73–74	Eldritch Wizardry, Monster Manual, Book of Vile Darkness		Inspired by its real-world mythological counterpart.
Pale Night	74–76			
Pazuzu	76–77	Monster Manual II		
Yeenoghu	78–79	Monster Manual, Book of Vile Darkness		
Zuggtmoy	79–80			

== WTC 9537672 – Monster Manual IV (2006) ==
Monster Manual IV features mostly new monsters. ISBN 0-7869-3920-6

Creature	Page	Other Appearances	Variants	Description
Avatars of Elemental Evil	7-14		Black rock triskelion (earth avatar), cyclonic ravager (air avatar), holocaust disciple (fire avatar), waterveiled assassin (water avatar)	
Balhannoth	15-17			
Bloodfire ooze	18-19		Blighted bloodfire	
Bloodhulk	20-22		Bloodhulk fighter, bloodhulk giant, bloodhulk crusher	A bloodhulk begins as an evil, fanatical, shamanistic human or similar creature whom others had come to worship as a god, and have many sacrifices made to it. When this creature dies, the gallons of blood from those sacrificed to it begin to run in its veins, and it arises as an oozing, hulking, misshapen abomination.
Bloodsilk spider	24-25			They are small, compact, short-legged creatures, far from terrifying and gigantic monstrous spiders, but their silk has an unusual property; those caught in it gradually have their blood drained by it so the spider can feed by sucking on the webs later.
Briarvex	26-27			
Clockroach	28-29			
Clockwork mender	30-31		Clockwork mender swarm	
Clockwork steed	32-33		Clockwork stallion, clockwork pony	
Concordant killer	34-35			
Corrupture	36-37			
Defacer	38-39			
Demon	40-47		Deathdrinker, kastighur, nashrou, whisper demon	
Demonhive	48-51		Demonhive attendant, demonet swarm, demonhive queen	
Dwarf ancestor	52-54			
Elf, drow	55-59		Lolth's Sting, dark sniper, arcane guard, drow priestess,	
Giant, craa'ghoran	60-61			
Githyanki	62-65		Githyanki soldier, gish, gityhanki captain	
Gnoll	67-71		Slave-taker, fiendish cleric of Yeenoghu, half-fiend gnoll warlock	
Golem, fang	72-73			
Howler wasp	74-75			
Inferno spider	76-77			
Joystealer	78-79			Joystealers are cruel, hapless creatures who have become trapped between the Material Plane and the Ethereal Plane, and they resemble pale, thin, female elves.
Justice archon	80-82			
Lizardfolk, Dark Talon tribe	83-88		Dark Talon soldier; Dark Talon champion; Dark Talon wasp rider; Dark Talon shaman; Yarshag, Dark Talon king	
Lodestone marauder	90-91			
Lolth-touched creature	92-94			Template.
Lunar ravager	95-97			
Mageripper swarm	98-99			
Minotaur, greathorn	100-101			
Nagatha	102-103			
Necrosis carnex	104-105			
Oaken defender	106-108			
Ogre	109-112		Ogre scout, ogre tempest, ogre guard thrall	
Orc	113-119		Orc berserker, war howler, orc battle priest, orc plague speaker, half-orc infiltrator	
Plague walker	120-121			
Quanlos	122-123			
Sailsnake	124-125			
Skiurid	126-127			
Spawn of Tiamat	128-163		Blackspawn raider, blackspawn exterminator, blackspawn stalker, bluespawn ambusher, bluespawn burrower, bluespawn godslayer, bluespawn stormlizard, greenspawn leaper, greenspawn razorfiend, greenspawn sneak, redspawn arcaniss, redspawn firebelcher, whitespawn hordeling, whitespawn hunter, whitespawn iceskidder	
Tomb spider	164-167		Tomb spider, tomb spider broodswarm, web mummy	
Varag	168-171		Varag pack leader	
Verdant prince	172-173			
Vitreous drinker	174-175			
Windblade	176-179		Windrazor, windscythe	
Wizened elder	180-181			
Wrackspawn	182-183			Wrackspawn are created/risen from the bodies of those fallen in battle, tortured prisoners, or others who endured extreme pain and bodily damage before death.
Yuan-ti	184-187		Pureblood slayer, halfblood deceiver, abomination cult leader	
Yuan-ti ignan	188-189			
Yugoloth	190-192		Corruptor of fate, corruptor of fate assassin	Corruptor of Fate, a yugoloth "that brings bad luck and enjoys causing suffering".
Voor	193-194		Dreadful lasher	
Zern	195-196			
Zern experiments	197-199		Zern arcanovore, zern blade thrall	

== WTC 9537872 – Tome of Battle: The Book of Nine Swords (2006) ==
Tome of Battle: The Book of Nine Swords is a sourcebook which focused on combat adaptations. (p151-158) – ISBN 0-7869-3922-2

Creature	Page	Other Appearances	Variants	Description
Naityan rakshasa	151-154			
Reth dekala	154-156			
Valkyrie	156-158			

== WTC 9538772 – Fiendish Codex II: Tyrants of the Nine Hells (2006) ==
Fiendish Codex II: Tyrants of the Nine Hells is a sourcebook which focuses on devils. (p107-140) – ISBN 0-7869-3940-0

Creature	Page	Other Appearances	Variants	Description
Abishai	108-112		Black abishai, blue abishai, green abishai, red abishai, white abishai	
Amnizu	112-114			
Assassin devil (dogai)	114-115			
Ayperobos swarm	115-117			
Harvester devil (falxugon)	117-119			
Hellfire engine	119-120			
Kalabon	120-122			
Legion devil (merregon)	122-123			
Malebranche	124-125			
Narzugon	125-127			
Nupperibo	127-128			
Orthon	128-130			
Paeliryon	130-132			
Pain devil (excuciarch)	132-134			
Pleasure devil (brachina)	134-135			
Spined devil (spinagon)	136-137			
Steel devil (bueroza)	137-138			
Xerfilstyx	138-140			

== WTC 9568172 – Monster Manual V (2007) ==
Monster Manual V features mostly new monsters. ISBN 978-0-7869-4115-5

Creature	Page	Other Appearances	Variants	Description
Arcadian avenger	8-9			
Banshrae	10-11			Banshrae are spiteful fey that can use their magical flutes like blowguns.
Blackwing	12-13			
Burrow root	14-15			
Dalmosh	16-17			
Deadborn vulture	18-19		Deadborn vulture zombie	
Demon	20-29		Adaru, carnage demon, draudnu, gadacro, solamith	
Demonthorn mandrake	30-31			
Devil	32-37		Gulthir, remmanon, stitched devil	
Dragons of the great game	38-47		Chorranthau the Inscrutable, Morlicantha, Singh the Immense, xorvintaal dragon (template)	
Elemental mage	48-51		Ken-kuni, ken-li, ken-sun	
Ember guard	52-53			
Ethereal defiler	54-55			
Fetid fungus	56-57			
Frostwind virago	58-59			
Garngrath	60-61			
Gem scarab	62-63			
God-blooded creature	64-67		Nozgûg, Gruumsh-Blooded Orc	Template.
Golem	68-71		Force golem, magmacore golem	
Graveyard sludge	72-73			
Greenspawn zealot	74-75			
Guulvorg	76-77			
Haunt	78-83		Bridge haunt, forest haunt, taunting haunt	
Hobgoblin	84-89		Hobgoblin duskblade, hobgoblin spellscourge, hobgoblin warcaster, hobgoblin warsoul	
Illurien	90-91			
Jaebrin	92-93			
Kuo-toa	94-99		Crazed kuo-toa, kuo-toa exalted whip, kuo-toa harpooner, kuo-toa monitor	
Malastor	100-101			
Merchurion	102-103			
Mind flayers of Thoon	104-125		Thoon disciple, shadow flayer, Thoon infiltrator, Thoon thrall, Thoon soldier, madcrafter of Thoon, scyther of Thoon, stormcloud of Thoon, Thoon hulk, Thoon elder brain	
Mockery bug	126-129		Mockery monarch, mockery drone	
Phantom	130-131		Kugan, phantom ghast ninja	
Ruin chanter	132-133			
Ruin elemental	134-135			
Rylkar	136-141		Rylkar harridan, rylkar madclaw, rylkar tormentor, rylkspawn swarm	
Sanguineous drinker	142-143			
Scouring construct	144-147		Scouring slinger, slinger scorpion, scouring stanchion	
Shadeling	148-149			
Shardsoul slayer	150-151			
Siege beetle	152-153			
Skull lord	154-161		Bonespur, serpentir, spectral rider	
Spawn of Juiblex	162-165		Lesser spawn of Juiblex, greater spawn of Juiblex, elder spawn of Juiblex	
Spirrax	166-167			
Steelwing	168-169			
Thrym hound	170-171			
Tirbana	172-179		Tirbana eyewing, tirbana drowser, tirbana slayer, tirbana spawner	
Troll, bladerager	180-181			
Tusk terror	182-183			
Ushemoi	184-189		Arkamoi, hardimoi, lashemoi, turlemoi	
Vampire	190-195		The Black Duke, the Red Widow	
Verdant reaver	196-197			
Vinespawn	198-199			
Vivisector	200-201			
Wild Hunt	202-203		Master of the Hunt, Hound of the Hunt	

== WTC 9568472 – Dungeonscape (2007) ==
Dungeonscape is a sourcebook that focuses on dungeon adventuring. (p105-116) – ISBN 978-0-7869-4118-6

Creature	Page	Other Appearances	Variants	Description
Ascomoid	105-106			
Rot grub swarm	106-107			
Acidborn monster	111-112			
Dungeonbred monster	112-113			
Guardian monster	113-114			
Sentry ooze	114-115			
Hivenest monster	115-116			
