= Dungeons & Dragons: Heroes =

2003 video game

- Cover art by Glenn Fabry
- Developer: Atari Interactive Hunt Valley Studio
- Publisher: Atari, Inc.
- Producer: Martin DeRiso
- Designer: Brenda Brathwaite
- Programmer: Will Gee
- Artist: David Thompson
- Composer: Gary Spinrad
- Platform: Xbox
- Release: NA: September 16, 2003; EU: November 14, 2003; AU: November 21, 2003
- Genre: Hack and slash
- Modes: Single-player, multiplayer

Dungeons & Dragons: Heroes is a hack and slash video game with RPG elements, it was developed by Atari Interactive Hunt Valley Studio and published by Atari, Inc., exclusively for Xbox in 2003. It is set in the Dungeons & Dragons universe and is playable solo or with up to four players. Players take on the role of four reincarnated heroes brought back to life to fight their former nemesis, a wizard named Kaedin.

== Gameplay ==
Up to four players can play, each of whom can control one of four characters: a dwarf cleric, an elf wizard, a halfling rogue, and a human fighter. Players can join and quit the game at any time. The characters can be a mixed group of varying levels, and when a character levels up, the player can delay the process of distributing new points and skills until after any current combat or action sequences complete. The game has four difficulty levels: easy, normal, hard, and nightmare, the latter of which can only be played after completing the game on the hard setting. The game also features a large variety of monsters from the Dungeons & Dragons Monster Manuals, including red dragons, yuan-tis, and fire giants.

== Plot ==
One hundred and fifty years before the present, the wizard Kaedin had opened four portals leading to different planes of existence. He harnessed power of the four planes to create "Planar Gems", each with the same power as the planes they came from. He then created a fifth Gem to control the four Planar Gems and entrusted a beholder to protect it. Beholders are long-lived, and this one still protects it to this day. Kaedin became more powerful and malevolent with the four Planar Gems, and conquered town after town. The Kingdom of Baele called for its best and brightest, and four souls answered the call (your characters in the game). They traveled to Kaedin's castle and killed him. As Kaedin died, he cast a final spell that killed the four heroes. With Kaedin dead, the heroes were buried with full honors and the Gems were banished to the planes where they remain. Castle Baele was built over the site of the four portals and Kaedin's body is thrown into an unmarked grave.

One hundred and fifty years later, a group of evil clerics sought to channel the dead wizard's power, but Kaedin revived and killed them all. Now a group of good clerics revives the four heroes to go after Kaedin. The four go through the crypts and fight the Bulette. After heading out into the swamps, They find a shadowy rogue who gives you information on the castle and whom to contact there. At the end of the swamps, they enter Castle Baele.

Upon arriving at Castle Baele, the four travel to the shoppe and chat with Rik, the shopkeeper. He informs the four that they need to get the Planar Gems. Although, you need to attain certain keys first. The four head to the Dragon's Tankard to talk with the rogues (of which one is Lidda, featured in the Dungeons and Dragons Player's Handbook, the halfling rogue). She gives the heroes the key to the Great Hall in exchange for killing all of the Trolls in the marketplace, and the heroes go there. After clearing out the Great Hall, the heroes return to Rik and he tells them that they must collect the four Scepters to open the portals to the first plane. After clearing out the Treasury, Barracks, Church of Pelor and the Dungeons, the four return to Rick with the four scepters.

After attaining the scepters, the four kill the beholder guarding the Gem of Winds (the fifth Gem Kaedin made) and take it back to Rik. He explains how to open the first portal, and the heroes go to the Wilds and kill the Yuan-Ti. They fight to the top of the trees and then to a bluff where they fight an Yrthak. After defeating the Yrthak the heroes take the Gem of Nature, which opens the portal to the Forge. This is a hot and fiery level full of clockwork soldiers and workers (with some Fire Elementals and Fire giants as well). The four fight their way to a red dragon and defeat it. They claim the Gem of Fire and open the portal to the Frostbound. Upon arriving, the heroes come to a sorceress who wants some Ice Golems dead. Working their way through barbarians, frost wolves and killing the Ice Golems, the heroes make their way to the Frost Worm's Lair; and they kill the Frost Worm and take the Gem of Ice, which opens the portal to Bone Necropolis. The heroes discover that Rik is missing, and Lidda supposes that he got wise to the situation and moved on. After fighting many undead in the Bone Necropolis, the four come across the Bone Bridge and defeat many more undead foes. In the Bone Temple, the heroes come up against very powerful creatures. The heroes are tested, but come out victorious. In the inner sanctum the four come across a Lich, which they defeat with their upgraded ancestral weapons and claim the Gem of Death.

Upon returning to the Shoppe, the heroes find they now must travel to Kaedin's flying castle. The heroes find out that Rik is actually Kaedin. He laughs and mocks the four, as they decide to follow him and end this once and for all. They fight many beasts and pull many levers until they face Kaedin the first time. He flees further into the castle, where the four find him in another tower and fight him until he leaves a second time. Upon fighting him the third time, he uses the Gems to call upon the power stored in them. Because the four actually possess the real Gems, they can defeat Kaedin and destroy the Gems leaving Baele in peace, and the heroes help to rebuild the Castle and help the surrounding communities.

== Characters ==
There are four playable characters in the game:

- Human Fighter: he is from Castle Baele originally, after losing his father in the Far North on the island of Axion. He arrived in Baele as Kaedin rose to power, and helped defeat the wizard the first time (and losing his life in the process). 150 years after, he was resurrected by the dwarven clerics to battle Kaedin again.
- Elf Wizard: raised in Baele, this elf trained with the staff and magic. She accepted the call to kill Kaedin when the head of her Guild called: "If your power be equal to Kaedin, bring yourself forward". 150 years later she steps forward again to kill Kaedin once and for all.
- Dwarf Cleric: he was raised in mountain halls, and trained as a Cleric of Moradin. He went to Baele seeking a drink after clearing out some evil dwarves and heard about an evil wizard named Kaedin conquering town after town. He decided it was Moradin's Will to kill this wizard. 150 years later, Moradin's Clerics raised him from the dead to seek out Kaedin and kill him again.
- Halfling Rogue: orphaned at the age of 5, this rogue was left in the care of the Seven Stars Crew, a feared gang of rogues. She was trained, and then helped a wizard of some renown to attain some amulets. 10 years later she found out that the same wizard had destroyed her village. Kaedin was his name, and she left for Baele to exact revenge. 150 years later, her conviction to kill the wizard is still as strong as ever.

Each hero has a unique ancestral weapon which lost its power when Kaedin placed a curse upon it. Throughout the game, players collect Soul Shards to upgrade the weapon's power. Heroes all have some unique abilities which can be leveled up as the game progresses.

== Development ==
Dungeons and Dragons: Heroes was unveiled by Infogrames prior to E3 2002 on May 16 as a multi-platform title for the PlayStation 2, GameCube and Xbox for a Fall 2002 release window, although no developer was announced for this project. The title was originally scheduled for release in March 2003.

In January 2003, the title's website was launched. IGN noted in April that pre-orders and listings for the PlayStation 2 version were removed from various game store websites like GameStop, hinting that the game may become a console exclusive, which was officially confirmed in May by the now-rebranded Atari at E3 2003, where they announced that the game would only be released for the Xbox, and that the PlayStation 2 and GameCube versions were cancelled. The game was once again delayed, this time for a fall release. It was finally released in North America on September 16, 2003, in Europe on November 14, 2003, and in Australia on November 21, 2003.

== Reception ==
Reception

Aggregate scores
Aggregator	Score
GameRankings	74%
Metacritic	72/100

GameSpot compared the game to the Baldur's Gate: Dark Alliance series and rated it with a score of 6.6/10 (fair). According to GameSpy, Heroes wasn't a "terribly" deep or rich experience, but for mindless arcade hacking, it was a "pretty" good choice for Xbox owners. Dungeons & Dragons: Heroes has an aggregate score of 74% on GameRankings.
