= Yuan-ti =

Fictional monster from Dungeons & Dragons

- First appearance: Dwellers of the Forbidden City (1981)
- Created by: David "Zeb" Cook

In-universe information
- Type: Monstrous humanoid
- Alignment: Chaotic Evil

The yuan-ti are a fictional species of evil snakemen in the fantasy role-playing game Dungeons & Dragons. The species comprises a number of castes. In some campaign settings, the yuan-ti are descended from evil human cultists who mixed their bloodlines with those of serpents. They have formidable psychic abilities.

They first appeared in Dwellers of the Forbidden City, a 1981 module for the first edition of Advanced Dungeons & Dragons, and have featured in all Dungeons & Dragons editions published since.

== Publication history ==
The yuan-ti are a species of "cult-like snake people". The yuan-ti were introduced to the D&D game in the first edition of Advanced Dungeons & Dragons.

=== Advanced Dungeons & Dragons 1st edition (1977–1988) ===
The original yuan-ti castes were the abominations, the halfbreeds, and the purebloods, which first appeared in the module Dwellers of the Forbidden City (1981), In the adventure, the characters are hired to find an object taken to a lost oriental-style city, which has been taken over by a cult of snake-worshipers, the yuan-ti, and their servants, the mongrelmen and tasloi. The yuan-ti and its three variant types were all later featured in the first edition Monster Manual II (1983).

Yuan-ti history and society were detailed in Dragon #151 (November 1989), in the "Ecology of the Yuan-Ti", which also introduced the histachii.

=== Advanced Dungeons & Dragons 2nd edition (1989–1999) ===
The yuan-ti first appear in Monstrous Compendium Volume One (1989), and is reprinted in the Monstrous Manual (1993), along with the abomination yuan-ti, the halfblood yuan-ti, and the pureblood yuan-ti.

The histachii yuan-ti appeared for the Kara-Tur campaign setting in the Monstrous Compendium Kara-Tur Appendix (1990), and is then reprinted in the Monstrous Manual (1993).

A psionic variation of the yuan-ti appeared in The Complete Psionics Handbook (1991).

=== Dungeons & Dragons 3.0 edition (2000–2002) ===
The yuan-ti appears in the Monster Manual for this edition (2000), including the abomination yuan-ti, the halfblood yuan-ti, and the pureblood yuan-ti.

The broodguard yuan-ti, the human broodguard yuan-ti, the tainted one yuan-ti, and the human tainted one yuan-ti for the Forgotten Realms setting appeared in Monsters of Faerun. The pureblood yuan-ti and the tainted one yuan-ti were presented as player character races in Races of Faerûn (2003).

The broodguard yuan-ti and the tainted one yuan-ti appeared as templates in Savage Species (2003).

The yuan-ti was detailed again in Dragon #305 (March 2003), in "Venom and Coil: The Secret Life of the Yuan-Ti". The yuan-ti abomination, the yuan-ti halfblood, and the yuan-ti pureblood are presented as player character races in this article.

The yuan-ti anathema appears in the Fiend Folio for this edition (2003).

The broodguard yuan-ti, the human broodguard yuan-ti, the tainted one yuan-ti, and the human tainted one yuan-ti appeared again in Ghostwalk (2003).

=== Dungeons & Dragons 3.5 edition (2003–2007) ===
The yuan-ti appears in the revised Monster Manual for this edition (2003), including the same variations from the previous Monster Manual.

Psionic versions of the yuan-ti abomination, the yuan-ti halfblood, and the yuan-ti pureblood appear in the Expanded Psionics Handbook (2004).

The yuan-ti broodguard, pureblood yuan-ti, and tainted one were presented as player character races for the Forgotten Realms setting in Serpent Kingdoms (2004). This book also included the yuan-ti holy guardian and the yuan-ti mageslayer.

The abomination cult leader yuan-ti, the halfblood deceiver yuan-ti, the yuan-ti ignan, and the pureblood slayer yuan-ti appear in Monster Manual IV (2006).

The yuan-ti wretchling for the Eberron setting appears in Secrets of Xen'drik (2006).

=== Dungeons & Dragons 4th edition (2008–) ===
The fourth edition Monster Manual mentions three types of yuan-ti, offering a total of five creatures. The origin of the yuan-ti is never discussed, but their patron is confirmed as Zehir. It offers the yuan-ti malison sharp-eye, the yuan-ti malison incanter, the yuan-ti malison disciple of Zehir, the yuan-ti abomination and the yuan-ti anathema.

=== Dungeons & Dragons 5th edition ===
The yuan-ti appears in the Fifth Edition Monster Manual (2014), featuring the yuan-ti pureblood, the yuan-ti abomination, and three types of yuan-ti malisons. Volo's Guide to Monsters (2016) offers additional information, further introducing yuan-ti anathema, yuan-ti broodguards, three variant malisons (the mind whisperer, the nightmare speaker, and pit master), as well as detailing the structure of yuan-ti religion and society and giving the traits for Yuan-ti Pureblood player characters.

The yuan-ti are involved in the adventure Tomb of Annihilation.

== Licensing ==
The yuan-ti are considered "product identity" by Wizards of the Coast and as such were not released under its Open Gaming License for the d20 System. As they are legally owned by the company, permission from Wizards of the Coast would be required to use them in other games.

== Analysis ==
=== Yuan-ti as trope ===
Snakes and snake-worship used in fiction have been criticized as characteristic of Orientalism. The publication history, digital and print, of Yuan-ti falls into this pattern as they serve as uncomplicated antagonists in "exotic" settings. Graeme Barber, a game designer noted for his critique of racism in Dungeons & Dragons, used Yuan-ti in his contribution to the book Candlekeep Mysteries. Controversy arose after Wizards of the Coast, according to Barber, altered his depiction of Yuan-ti. Summarizing his critique of the simplistic portrayal, Barber wrote, "Yuan-ti are evil because evil." Scholar of speculative fiction Nicolas B. Clark summarized the character of the yuan-ti as "subtle and savage" and saw them as examplary for a wider trend where cultural perceptions of reptiles as "cold, emotionless, alien" lead to depictions of reptilian humanoids in fiction as "unapologetically evil" and "the irredeemable monster that must be slain."

== Description ==
The types of yuan-ti have been summarized by A.V. Club as "a human-eating snake, or human-snake hybrid eater of humans and snakes, or other human-snake hybrids."

The yuan-ti is also available as a player character race in 5th edition.

=== Yuan-ti breeds ===
The yuan-ti come in several distinct castes or breeds. The three most prevalent, described in the Third Edition Monster Manual, are as follows:

- Purebloods appear mostly human, with minor reptilian features, such as slit pupils, a forked tongue, or patches of scales on their skin. They serve as diplomats and infiltrators, pretending to be human, both because of their skill and to avoid yuan-ti of other castes, who look down on them. Keith Ammann, in his 2019 book The Monsters Know What They're Doing, commented of the yuan-ti purebloods that "Yuan-ti have had hundreds of generations to live and adapt on their own, so they'll have the same self-preservation instinct as any evolved species."
- Halfbloods (or malisons in fourth and fifth editions) are humanoid in shape but have a wide variety of noticeable serpentine features, such as a snakelike tail in place of legs, a complete covering of scales, a hood like a cobra, a snake's head, or snakes in place of arms. Halfbloods serve as warriors and temple assistants.
- Abominations are almost completely snakelike, with only a few human features, such as arms or a humanoid head. They are the most venerated within the yuan-ti society, serving as clerics and in other roles of power.

In addition to the three main breeds, other breeds have been described as well:

- Tainted ones are human agents of the yuan-ti who have willingly undergone a ritual of transformation to make themselves yuan-ti, gaining a venomous bite and slight psionic ability. They retain their human appearance but often develop reptilian mannerisms, such as frequently licking their lips or drawing out sibilant sounds as they speak. They first appeared in Monstrous Compendium: Monsters of Faerûn.
- Broodguards, also known as histachii, are humans who have undergone the ritual of transformation but have been found unworthy, degenerating into hairless, near-mindless reptilian monsters. The yuan-ti employ these wretches as watchers over egg-broods and other demeaning tasks. They first appeared as the histachii in Dragon Magazine #151 ("The Ecology of the Yuan-ti" by David Wellman, 1989).
- Holy guardians are a rare breed specifically bred as temple guards; they are also sent on missions to obtain needed goods for abomination priests. Holy guardians are naturally servile and follow their superiors without question. They uniformly have a serpentile tail in place of legs and a snakelike head. They first appeared in Serpent Kingdoms for the Forgotten Realms world.
- Mageslayers, another rare type of yuan-ti, are bred for the special purpose of battling or hunting down human magic-users, and most of their abilities are magical rather than psionic. Mageslayers have a humanlike head but a snakelike tail instead of legs. They first appeared in Serpent Kingdoms.
- Anathemas are by far the most powerful and loathsome of yuan-ti, sometimes worshiped as divine incarnations of Merrshaulk, and are extremely rare. They are huge 25-foot long snakes with arms and claws. An anathema's power dwarfs even that of an abomination, but in their growing power and evil, they went insane and turned ferociously on their own kind. For pure survival, the yuan-ti banished them and anathemas are now found trapped in secure chambers or living away from yuan-ti cities, sometimes establishing new yuan-ti cults that worship Merrshaulk through them. Anathemas make a common practice of grafting yuan-ti body parts onto humans and other races for use as personal servants. They first appeared in the Third Edition version of the Fiend Folio, but are also described in the 4th edition Monster Manual.
- Ignans are another rare subspecies of yuan-ti that dwell in hotter climes of the world, including in volcanoes and on the Elemental Plane of Fire. Ignas are similar to yuan-ti halfbloods, except they are slightly more powerful due to some of the fire spells they wield. Ignans were first described in Monster Manual IV.
- Wretchlings are pathetic creatures created out of humans and used as guards and expendable shock troops by the yuan-ti. They are unintelligent and wander throughout the jungles of Xen'drik. Wretchlings have no memory of their former human lives and have a savage desire to kill, though they lack the intellect for complex strategies unless carefully instructed by their masters. Wretchlings look like scaly humans with fangs, reptilian eyes and patchy hair. They first appeared in Secrets of Xen'drik.

== Society ==
The goal of the Yuan-ti, as dictated by their demonic god Merrshaulk, is to bring about the ultimate destruction of the world.

In addition, there is a sub-faction of Yuan-ti, the Vanguard of Sertrous (outlined in Elder Evils), who follow the teachings of the ancient obyrinth Sertrous, sometimes known as the first heretic, who wish to assist him in reconquering his layer of the Abyss.

Yuan-ti society as described The Ecology of the Yuan-Ti, Dragon #151, 1989 was divided into the pureblood, halfbreed and abomination castes. The histachii were described as the progenitors of the yuan-ti. It was necessary for the yuan-ti to acquire human captives to turn into histachii, as breeding between any of three yuan-ti castes resulted only in abominations, while histachii could produce purebloods and halfbreeds.

In 5th edition, there is no god who patrons the yuan-ti, but the Monster Manual lists Dendar, the Night Serpent, Merrshaulk, Master of the Pit, and Sseth, the Sibilant Death, as their gods, and reinvents them as a transhuman species who originally viewed snakes as the epitome of logic and stoic behavior, building cults to the serpent gods who gave them the knowledge to ritually breed with snakes, creating their race. They seek to rebuild their ancient empires through manipulation, such as awe, pleasure and terror, promising wealth and power. They build cults and seek to achieve great power in order to devour and supplant their gods.

== In various campaign settings ==
Yuan-ti appear in several Dungeons & Dragons settings, notably Eberron, the Forgotten Realms, and Greyhawk.

=== In Eberron ===
While the yuan-ti do not feature as prominently in Eberron as in some other settings, they still have some significance and influence, especially in Xen’drik. Yuan-ti in Eberron worship the Devourer.

==== In Khorvaire ====
No yuan-ti are known to live in Khorvaire, with the exception of the shulassakar (see below). If any do, they probably live in warm marshy or forested areas, such as Q’barra and the Shadow Marches.

==== In Xen’drik ====
The yuan-ti have many forest and underground bases in Xen'drik, since it is their main power base on Eberron. The yuan-ti of Xen’drik create wretchlings, ssvaklors and magebred vipers to guard their strongholds on that continent.

==== In Argonnessen ====
After fleeing from the Inspired in Sarlona, many yuan-ti settled in Argonnessen, with the approval of some dragons. It was this union that gave rise to the ssvaklors. After a while, the yuan-ti were banished to Xen’drik, where they became evil and corrupt.

==== In Sarlona ====
The yuan-ti native to Sarlona fled before the Inspired, sailing to the other three continents. Whether or not there are still yuan-ti in Sarlona is unknown.

==== Shulassakar ====
The shulassakar, or feathered serpents, are a race of lawful good-aligned yuan-ti native to the ruins of Krezent in the Talenta Plains. The shulassakar revere the couatl and the Silver Flame. They resemble yuan-ti, but are covered with feathers (and, in some cases, wings), emphasising their connection to the couatl. Pureblood shulassakar are called bloodsworn, halfbloods are called flametouched and abominations are called transcendents. It is unknown if other kinds of shulassakar exist.

==== Notable yuan-ti in Eberron ====
The shulassakar transcendent paladin Sesstaria wanders Xen’drik, seeking out and killing yuan-ti, considering it her holy mission.

=== In the Forgotten Realms ===
Long before humans dominated the continent of Faerûn, the Creator Races ruled Toril. The reptilian Creator Race, the sauroids, or sarrukh, were foremost amongst these and built up empires such as Okoth, Isstosseffifil and Mhairshaulk. They bred the first yuan-ti by magically experimenting with and breeding men with snakes. This way they also created nagas, and through a similar process, lizardmen. The sarrukh eventually fell from power and the resourceful yuan-ti rose up to claim their Creators' power vacuum, even for while sustaining the empire of Mhairshaulk. Of the fragmented World Serpent deity that the sarrukh had worshipped, the yuan-ti venerated the strongest aspect, a cruel and despotic deity, Merrshaulk, who grew distant and aloof.

As the yuan-ti's power became less visible on Faerûn, and they instead fell to infiltrating human and demihuman society through their organisations (such as the Coiled Cabal and the various tribes and Houses) and long-sighted plots, Merrshaulk had sunk into a slumber, ignoring his followers. Eventually, around the time of the collapse of the human empire of Netheril, Merrshaulk himself was also reborn as a winged yuan-ti avatar named Sseth, who led the yuan-ti into reclaiming the empire of Mhairshaulk as a new yuan-ti empire—Serpentes—became the yuan-ti's new primary deity. In the end, though, Sseth too sank into somnolence.

At this point some sarrukh, long suffering a heavy war on other planes or sunken in hibernation in their ruins, began to return in some numbers. They crucially needed help from their deity, but Sseth was not answering prayers in his slumber. So for aid in their endeavors some of the sarrukh made a bargain with the Mulhorandi deity Set, that put Sseth into a deeper sleep but allowed Set to assume Sseth's mantle and grant the sauroids their aid. Most yuan-ti do not even know of this transaction, though now that Sseth struggles at his bonds some are being made aware of it.

Famous yuan-ti in the Forgotten Realms include Zstulkk Ssarmn of the ruthless trade and slaving consortium the Iron Ring; his nephew Nhyris D'Hothek, one time possessor of the Crown of Horns; the Serpent Sibyl, whose body was used as Sseth's avatar during the Time of Troubles; the ruling House Extaminos family of Hlondeth, and the very powerful Scion, Zelia, who was featured prominently in the trilogy, "House of Serpents".

=== In Greyhawk ===
In the World of Greyhawk campaign setting, the yuan-ti are found mainly on the continent of Hepmonaland, where they dwell in a number of ruined cities. They are said to have been created from the human Olmans by a snake-headed god named Tlaloc, whose relationship with Merrshaulk is unknown. Yuan-ti play a significant role in the adventure, Dwellers of the Forbidden City.

== Other media ==
Yuan-ti play significant roles in various Dungeons & Dragons computer games. In Neverwinter Nights, a Yuan-ti is one of the four creatures the player must recapture to create a cure for a disease that is rampant across the city. They also play a major role in Icewind Dale, where they are ruled by a marilith named Yxunomei. In Icewind Dale II they are a late game enemy who have overrun the town of Kuldahar and must be repelled, back through the portal they arrived in, as well as being present in the 'Dragon's Eye' cave system. There is a side quest that involves a yuan-ti researcher who requires help in modifying the histachii transformation to retain his mind so he may examine the yuan-ti at close quarters. Yuan-ti appear as the main villain group in the expansion Neverwinter Nights 2: Storm of Zehir.

Yuan-ti also make appearances in Baldur's Gate II. The sarrukh, the creators of the yuan-ti, are also the primary antagonists of Neverwinter Nights.

Yuan-ti also appear in the Dungeons and Dragons Miniatures Game.

Yuan-ti also have a full region series of sidequests in the Ringing Mountains in Dark Sun: Wake of the Ravager.

== Reception ==
Bleeding Cool described the yuan-ti as being among "D&D's most popular and iconic monsters".

TheGamer.com in April 2021 listed the yuan-ti pureblood as #2 on their list of "10 Most Underrated Races That Are Better Than You Think".

CBR.com listed the yuan-ti pure blood as #5 on their list of "Top 10 Playable Species In D&D".

Bill Slavicsek and Richard Baker called the yuan-ti "classic D&D monsters", and ranked the massive yuan-ti anathema as number ten among the best high-level monsters, speaking from a 4th edition view.

== See also ==
- Naga
- The Shadow Kingdom
