= Gelatinous cube =

Fictional Dungeons & Dragons monster

- Dungeons & Dragons race
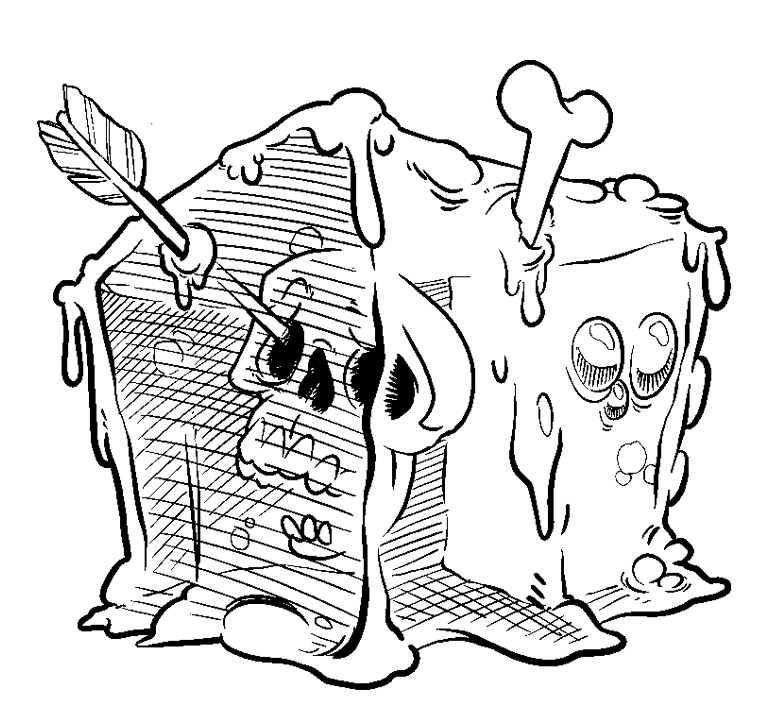
- An illustration of a gelatinous cube
- First appearance: the original Dungeons & Dragons "white box" set (1974)

In-universe information
- Type: Ooze
- Alignment: Neutral

A gelatinous cube is a fictional monster from the Dungeons & Dragons fantasy role-playing game. It is described as a ten-foot cube of transparent gelatinous ooze, which is able to absorb and digest organic matter.

== Creative origins ==
Oozes are relatively common antagonists in fantasy fiction; in addition to the oozes of Dungeons & Dragons, examples include the monster from the film The Blob (1958), slime in Dragon Quest, and flan in Final Fantasy. These fictional oozes may have been inspired by microscopic organisms such as amoebae, which, like oozes, can consume organic matter by engulfing it (phagocytosis).

The gelatinous cube is an original invention of Gary Gygax, rather than being inspired by outside sources and adapted to the roleplaying setting, as were many mythological monsters such as the minotaur and dryad, all of which appeared in the 1974 Monsters & Treasure book of the original boxed set.

Being a cube that is a perfect ten feet on each side, it is specifically and perfectly "adapted" to its native environment, the standard, 10-foot (3.0 m) by 10-foot (3.0 m) dungeon corridors which were ubiquitous in the earliest Dungeons & Dragons modules.

== Publication history ==
The gelatinous cube first appeared in the original Dungeons & Dragons "white box" set (1974), and its first supplement, Greyhawk (1975).

The gelatinous cube appeared in the Dungeons & Dragons Basic Set (1977, 1981, 1983). The gelatinous cube also appeared in the Dungeons & Dragons Rules Cyclopedia (1991).

The gelatinous cube appeared in first edition Advanced Dungeons & Dragons in the original Monster Manual (1977). The creature was further developed in Dragon #124 (August 1987). Published first edition Advanced Dungeons & Dragons adventures which included gelatinous cubes as adversaries that the player characters encounter included "The Ruins of Andril", published in Dragon #81.

The gelatinous cube appeared in second edition in Monstrous Compendium Volume One (1989), and the Monstrous Manual (1993) under the "ooze/slime/jelly" heading. The gelatinous cube was featured on an AD&D Trading Card in 1991.

Under the ooze entry, the gelatinous cube appears in the third edition Monster Manual (2000), the 3.5 revised Monster Manual (2003), the fourth edition Monster Manual (2008), the Monster Vault (2010), and the fifth edition Monster Manual (2014). Witwer et al. viewed its artistic rendering in 5th edition as "redesigned from prior editions to entice more Dungeon Master use."

=== Other publishers ===
The gelatinous cube is fully detailed in Paizo Publishing's book Dungeon Denizens Revisited (2009), on pages 16–21.

== Fictional ecology ==
A gelatinous cube looks like a transparent ooze of mindless, gelatinous matter in the shape of a cube. The cube's transparency coupled with a dimly-lit dungeon gives it the element of surprise to engulf unsuspecting beings, and only an alert adventurer will notice the cube. The cube slides through dungeon corridors, being able to mold its body to flow around objects and fit through narrow passages and then returning to its original shape once enough space is available. A cube will absorb everything in its path, with its acidic digestive juices dissolving everything organic and secreting non-digestible matter in its wake. David M. Ewalt, in his book Of Dice and Men, describes the gelatinous cube as "a dungeon scavenger, a living mound of transparent jelly", The Ashgate Encyclopedia of Literary and Cinematic Monsters called it a "dungeon clean up crew", well adapted to this unique fictitious ecosystem.

== Reception ==
Rob Bricken from io9 named the gelatinous cube as one of the 10 most memorable D&D monsters.

Chris Sims of the on-line magazine ComicsAlliance stated of the gelatinous cube that "there can be no question of what is the greatest monster" in D&D, calling the gelatinous cube "amazing".

The Ashgate Encyclopedia of Literary and Cinematic Monsters called the gelatinous cube one of the "iconic monsters" of the D&D game.

Levi R. Bryant calls the gelatinous cube "irksome and dangerous", "populating many a dungeon".

== In other media ==
- Gelatinous cubes have appeared in the television series Adventure Time by Pendleton Ward. They also appear in several video games, including NetHack, and Baldur's Gate: Dark Alliance.
- A gelatinous cube appears in the 2017 episode "The Serfsons", the season premiere of the twenty-ninth season of the animated television series The Simpsons.
- A gelatinous cube appears in the 2020 Pixar Animation Studios film Onward. The film's credits include a thanks to Wizards of the Coast for allowing them to use the Beholder and the gelatinous cube.
- A gelatinous cube appears in the 2023 film Dungeons & Dragons: Honor Among Thieves. The film's release was accompanied by a Hasbro-produced action figure of such a cube in 1/12 (6-inch) scale.
- A gelatinous cube appears in the Saturday Morning Adventures limited comic series to the Dungeons & Dragons animated series.
