= Serpent Kingdoms =

2004 role-playing game supplement

- Genre: Role-playing game
- Publisher: Wizards of the Coast
- Publication date: July 2004
- Media type: Print
- ISBN: 0-7869-3277-5

Serpent Kingdoms is a supplement to the 3.5 edition of the Dungeons & Dragons role-playing game.

== Contents ==
Serpent Kingdoms details the creatures collectively known as the Scaled Ones in the Forgotten Realms setting: the lizardfolk, nagas, yuan-ti, and the creator race the sarrukh.

== Publication history ==
Serpent Kingdoms was written by Eric L. Boyd, Darrin Drader, and Ed Greenwood, and published in July 2004. Cover art was by Michael Sutfin, with interior art by Kalman Andrasofszky, Thomas Baxa, Dennis Crabapple, Wayne England, Carl Frank, Ralph Horsley, Jim Pavelec, Richard Sardinha, and Joel Thomas.

== Reviews ==
- Backstab #49
