= Candlekeep Mysteries =

D&D 5e adventure module

- Rules required: Dungeons & Dragons, 5th edition
- Character levels: 1-16
- Lead designers: Christopher Perkins
- Authors: Graeme Barber, Bill Benham, Kelly Lynne D’Angelo, Alison Huang, Mara Holmes, Jennifer Kretchmer, Daniel Kwan, Adam Lee, Ari Levitch, Sarah Madsen, Christopher Perkins, Michael Polkinghorn, Taymoor Rehman, Derek Ruiz, Kienna Shaw, Brandes Stoddard, Amy Vorpahl, Toni Winslow-Brill
- First published: March 16, 2021
- Pages: 224
- ISBN: 978-0-7869-6722-3

Candlekeep Mysteries is an adventure anthology for the 5th edition of the Dungeons & Dragons fantasy role-playing game.

== Summary ==
Candlekeep Mysteries is an anthology of one-shot adventure modules named after the fictional fortress library on the Sword Coast of the Forgotten Realms. Candlekeep Library acts as a central hub and starting point for each adventure. "Not all adventures in D&D take place in the Sword Coast, however, so while Candlekeep Mysteries devotes a lot of background information to its locale, it also covers ways Dungeon Masters can integrate the setting into their own campaign settings and other" campaign settings such as Exandria, Eberron, and Greyhawk. If set in the Forgotten Realms, the presumed year is 1492 DR.

=== Adventures ===
The adventures, in the order of presentation and including author, are:

- The Joy of Extradimensional Spaces (level 1) by Michael Polkinghorn
- Mazfroth's Mighty Digressions (level 2) by Alison Huang
- Book of the Raven (level 3) by Christopher Perkins
- A Deep and Creeping Darkness (level 4) by Sarah Madsen
- Shemshime's Bedtime Rhyme (level 4) by Ari Levitch
- The Price of Beauty (level 5) by Mara Holmes
- Book of Cylinders (level 6) by Graeme Barber
- Sarah of Yellowcrest Manor (level 7) by Derek Ruiz
- Lore of Lurue (level 8) by Kelly Lynne D'Angelo
- Kandlekeep Dekonstruktion (level 9) by Amy Vorpahl
- Zikran's Zephyrean Tome (level 10) by Taymoor Rehman
- The Curious Tale of Wisteria Vale (level 11) by Kienna Shaw
- The Book of Inner Alchemy (level 12) by Daniel Kwan
- The Canopic Being (level 13) by Jennifer Kretchmer
- The Scrivener's Tale (level 14) by Brandes Stoddard
- Alkazaar's Appendix (level 15) by Adam Lee
- Xanthoria (level 16) by Toni Winslow-Brill

== Publication history ==
The alternate print cover designed by Simen Meyer.

The new anthology was officially announced on January 12, 2021 and it was released on March 16, 2021. The standard cover was designed by the artist Clint Cearley. An alternate art cover edition, designed by the artist Simen Meyer, of the book is only available through local game stores. Corey Plante, for Inverse, highlighted that "altogether, 18 authors are credited in Candlekeep Mysteries, including D&D mainstays like Narrative Designer Ari Levitch, Creative Writer Adam Lee, and Senior Story Designer Chris Perkins. The full list is a mix of high-profile players, podcasters, and game designers".

It was also released as a digital product through the following Wizards of the Coast licensees: D&D Beyond, Fantasy Grounds, and Roll20.

On the book's development, Chris Perkins said, "It brought back memories of working on Dungeon Magazine back in the day. It was pretty much the exact same thing: Somebody comes to you with an idea, and I’m just using my experience with the rules and history of the game to try to help them shape that into something I know will serve the needs of the DMs—and hoping to help them close any logic holes I detect or helping them twist an idea slightly to make it more useful to DMs. [...] I think that what I learned through this process is that short adventures are, in some ways, harder to pull off than longer adventures, because you’ve got this unforgivable constraint of space. I think that this experience reminded me of that. But the other thing I learned to do is that, asking someone to write a mystery is a challenge, and it takes time to crack that nut because you don’t know how it’s going to play".

After publication, author Graeme Barber requested his name be removed from further printings of the book. According to Barber, upon comparing his submitted draft to the final publication he discovered that the editorial team's reduction of the draft resulted in the Yuan-ti "being evil for evil’s sake, the Grippli had their culture striped out and so on" and that "colonialist language and imagery around the Grippli was inserted as well". "Other contributors reportedly enjoyed more inclusion in later stages of editing, and public comments have decried the way Wizards of the Coast cut contact with Barber before substantially altering his submission. Barber admits that Wizards of the Coast had no contractual obligation to inform him of the changes". Wizards of the Coast has not publicly commented.

== Reception ==
In Publishers Weekly's "Best-selling Books Week Ending March 25, 2021", Candlekeep Mysteries was #4 in "Hardcover Nonfiction" and sold 19,542 units; the following week it dropped to #24. In USA Today's "Best-Selling Books for the week ending March 21, 2021", Candlekeep Mysteries was #18.

On CBR's 2021 "Dungeons & Dragons: Candlekeep Mysteries' 5 Best Stories" list the top five adventures are: Shemshime's Bedtime Rhyme, Sarah Of Yellowcrest Manor, A Deep And Creeping Darkness, The Price of Beauty, and The Scrivener's Tale. On Screen Rant's 2021 "Dungeons & Dragons' Best Adventures In Candlekeep Mysteries" list the top three adventures are: The Joy of Extradimensional Space, The Scrivener's Tale, and Kandlekeep Dekonstruktion.

Charlie Hall, for Polygon, highlighted that "the adventures themselves are tremendous, and feature some of the best writing of this generation of D&D. The complications they present are a delight [...]. In addition to the writing, the art direction in Candlekeep Mysteries is unusually strong. Chapters include work by different artists, giving each one a wholly different look and feel from the next. By contrast, the maps presented throughout the book are simple, almost unadorned. [...] For bookworms of a different sort — that is, folks who love to buy RPG books and read them as others might a novel — there's another layer of fun to be had. Scattered throughout this set of adventures are a series of subtle nods to previous 5th edition campaigns [...]. While structurally an outlier, Candlekeep Mysteries nonetheless fits right in with the rest of the 5th edition material".

Gavin Sheehan, for Bleeding Cool, wrote that "each adventure takes on almost the same introduction, that you have come here and discovered a particular book. [...] From the player's standpoint, the adventure of the unknown is the real selling point to taking on some of these adventures. [...] Candlekeep Mysteries is absolutely full of treasures and rewards that pay off for players beyond just getting 1,000 gold for their troubles. [...] It is possible to keep visiting Candlekeep to explore more of these adventures, but the price to get in is that you have to contribute a new book that they don't already own. This is essentially the Dungeons & Dragons way of giving the DM a McGuffin to prevent greedy players from coming back over and over if they happened to love one adventure and figure they could abuse the library for more riches. That being said, if the DM is truly adventurous, they could do more than one adventure, but it couldn't be back-to-back without causing some serious complications in the storytelling format. [...] Overall, Candlekeep Mysteries is one of the best additions to Dungeons & Dragons in Fifth Edition, and that's saying a lot considering everything that's been published over the past seven years".
