= Slime (monster) =

Type of fictional gelatinous creature

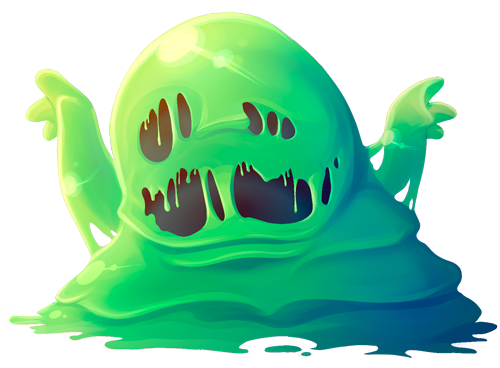
An illustration of a slime creature

In fiction, slimes, also called oozes, are amorphous creatures composed of gelatinous ooze. In literature and film, slimes typically take the role of horrific monsters, while in video games and anime, they are often depicted as cute low-level enemies.

== History ==
Rimuru, the protagonist of That Time I Got Reincarnated as a Slime

Slimes as monsters in literature originated with the writings of H. P. Lovecraft. In his novella At the Mountains of Madness, Lovecraft described shoggoths, shapeless beings made of black slime. Lovecraft's writings would go on to influence later Gothic fiction and other aspects of popular culture.

Slimes have appeared as monsters in tabletop games such as Dungeons & Dragons since the first printing in 1974, being partially inspired by horror films such as The Blob. Slime creatures in Dungeons & Dragons, such as the gelatinous cube, envelop prey before dissolving them in acidic ooze. The Dungeons & Dragons campaign setting Spelljammer: Adventures in Space (2022) introduced plasmoids as a playable race, making the "ability to reshape their body to their needs" available to players.

Drawing from their depiction in Dungeons & Dragons, Wizardry: Proving Grounds of the Mad Overlord features slimes as low-level monsters, which in turn inspired their appearance in Dragon Quest. The Dragon Quest slime, designed by Akira Toriyama, became a highly popular and recognizable character, and went on to influence slimes in other fantasy video games. Slimes in video games are typically 'cute' characters, sometimes appearing not only as common enemies but also as allies or pets. Cute slimes feature in games such as Slime Rancher, Stardew Valley, Terraria, Minecraft, and The Legend of Zelda franchise.

In the 2013 light novel series That Time I Got Reincarnated as a Slime, the protagonist is reincarnated in a fantasy isekai world as a small blue slime inspired by the slime from Dragon Quest. This series created a trend of anime featuring cute slimes. In Delicious in Dungeon, slime monsters are a core ingredient in several meals eaten throughout the series. Other examples of Japanese media featuring slimes are By the Grace of the Gods, I've Been Killing Slimes for 300 Years and Maxed Out My Level, and others.

An illustration of a slime girl.

A subcategory of slime creatures are slime girls, which are slimes that take a feminine humanoid appearance rather than an amorphous form. These monsters have appeared in media such as Monster Girl Encyclopedia, Monster Girl Quest, and Monster Musume. While slime girls frequently appear in hentai, they sometimes also feature in children's media, such as Puniru Is a Cute Slime.

== Analysis ==
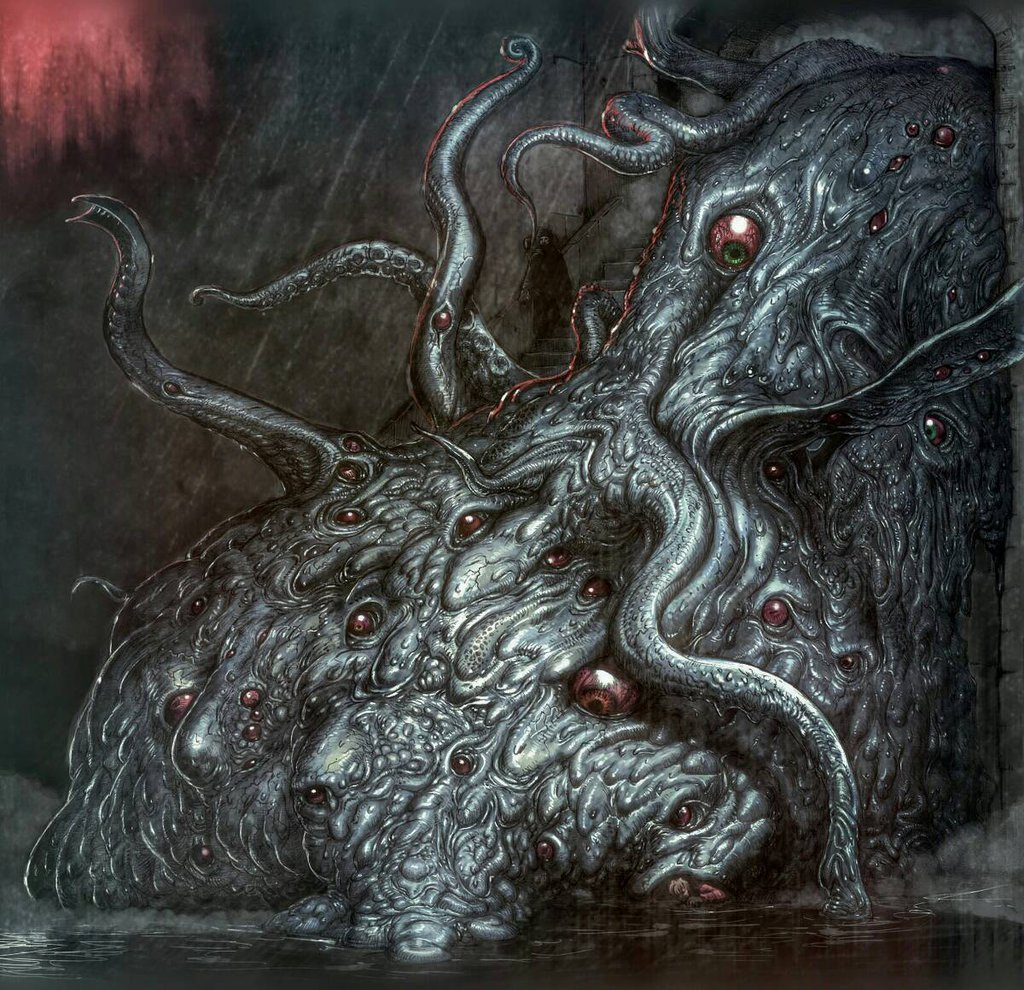
An artistic depiction of a shoggoth, an influential slime monster created by H. P. Lovecraft

According to Steven Shaviro, slime creatures in fiction often take the form of either a unicellular organism or a superorganism, "both of which cannot grasp its complex nature." Additionally, slimes lack the differentiation of organs and tissues that are characteristic of multicellular life. In this difference, slimes are "a collective without individuals, without any specialized parts, and without any sort of articulated (or hierarchical) structure." Marijeta Bradić writes that the motif of slimes in fiction "serves as a tool for questioning the idea of human exceptionalism."

Slime has had symbolic meaning in fiction. In science fiction, slime is often "a metaphor for the intangible or unthinkable", according to designer Steven Heller. Historically, some male writers, including Lovecraft, associated slime with femininity, characterizing women as disgustingly different from men. An example of this symbolism is in Lovecraft's short story "Dagon", which features a monster made of ooze and shares a name with Dagon, a Mesopotamian deity sometimes depicted as a hybrid of a fish and a woman. American journalist Daniel Engber considered slimes in cinema of the 1980s, such as Slimer and the ectoplasm in Ghostbusters, to be emblematic of cultural fears during the Cold War of nuclear radiation and radioactive material created by nuclear weapons.

Writing for Polygon, Ana Diaz described video game slimes as "loyal punching bags", owing to their role as common low-level enemies.

== See also ==
- Slime (toy)
