= Neutral good =

In economics, neutral goods refers either to goods whose demand is independent of income, or those that have no change on the consumer's utility when consumed.

Under the first definition, neutral goods have substitution effects but not income effects. Examples of this include prescription medicines such as insulin for diabetics. An individual's income may vary, but their consumption of vital medicines remains constant.

The second definition says that a good is neutral if the consumer is ambivalent towards its consumption. That is, the consumption of that good neither increases nor decreases the consumer's utility. For example, if a consumer likes texting, but is neutral about the data package on his phone contract, then increasing the data allowance does not alter his utility. An indifference curve—constructed with data allowance on the Y axis and text allowance is on the X axis forms a vertical line.

== Income elasticity and classification ==
Neutral goods are sometimes classified using their income elasticity of demand. Goods with an income elasticity close to zero are considered neutral because changes in consumer income do not meaningfully affect their quantity demanded. Because demand remains relatively unchanged as income rises or falls, neutral goods are distinct from normal goods—whose demand increases with income—and inferior goods—whose demand decreases as income increases.
