= List of Dungeons & Dragons fiction =

This is a list of Dungeons & Dragons fiction in the form of novels and short stories. Dungeons & Dragons has multiple official fictional settings and with it many novels and other fiction releases for each of these settings.

== 1970s and 1980s ==
1970s & 1980s
Date	Setting	Title	Type	Author(s)	ISBN	Series
06/1976-06/1977	Greyhawk	The Gnome Cache (Note: This novella was printed in 6 parts in Dragon magazine. The issues were 1,2,3,5,6,7.)	Novella	Garrison Ernst		
02/1978	Greyhawk	Quag Keep	Novel	Andre Norton	0-689-50107-2	Quag Keep
1980	D&D	Dragontales	Anthology	Various		Dragontales Magazine
06/1982	D&D	Dungeon of Dread	Endless Quest Book #1	Rose Estes	0-935696-86-5	Endless Quest Books
06/1982	D&D	Mountain of Mirrors	Endless Quest Book #2	Rose Estes	0-935696-87-3	Endless Quest Books
06/1982	D&D	Pillars of Pentegarn	Endless Quest Book #3	Rose Estes	0-935696-92-X	Endless Quest Books
06/1982	D&D	Return to Brookmere	Endless Quest Book #4	Rose Estes	0-935696-93-8	Endless Quest Books
01/1983	D&D	Revolt of the Dwarves	Endless Quest Book #5	Rose Estes	0-88038-020-9	Endless Quest Books
01/1983	D&D	Revenge of the Rainbow Dragons	Endless Quest Book #6	Rose Estes	0-88038-021-7	Endless Quest Books
07/1983	D&D	Circus of Fear	Endless Quest Book #10	Rose Estes	0-88038-037-3	Endless Quest Books
08/1983	D&D	Spell of the Winter Wizard	Endless Quest Book #11	Linda Lowery	0-88038-054-3	Endless Quest Books
11/1983	D&D	Dragon of Doom	Endless Quest Book #13	Rose Estes	0-88038-100-0	Endless Quest Books
11/1983	D&D	Raid on Nightmare Castle	Endless Quest Book #14	Catherine McGuire	0-88038-101-9	Endless Quest Books
02/1984	D&D	Under Dragon's Wing	Endless Quest Book #15	John Kendall	0-88038-076-4	Endless Quest Books
02/1984	D&D	The Dragon's Ransom	Endless Quest Book #16	Laura French	0-88038-077-2	Endless Quest Books
04/1984	Dragonlance	Dragons of Autumn Twilight	Novel	Margaret Weis & Tracy Hickman	0-88038-173-6	The Chronicles Trilogy
04/1984	Dragonlance	Canticle of the Dragon	Poem	Michael Williams	(Note: This poem is included in the book Dragons of Autumn Twilight.)	The Chronicles Trilogy
04/1984	Dragonlance	Song of Huma	Poem	Michael Williams		The Chronicles Trilogy
06/1984	D&D	King's Quest	Endless Quest Book #18	Tom McGowen	0-88038-079-9	Endless Quest Books
09/1984	D&D	Duel of the Masters	Endless Quest Book #21	Chris Martindale	0-88038-154-X	Endless Quest Books
09/1984	D&D	The Endless Catacombs	Endless Quest Book #22	Margaret Weis	0-88038-162-0	Endless Quest Books
11/1984	Kara-Tur	Blade of the Young Samurai	Endless Quest Book #23	Morris Simon	0-88038-155-8	Endless Quest Books
02/1985	AD&D	Prisoners of Pax Tharkas	Adventure Gamebook #1	Morris Simon	0880382090 / 9780880382090	Adventure Gamebook
03/1985	D&D	Lair of the Lich	Endless Quest Book #27	Bruce Algozin	0-88038-212-0	Endless Quest Books
03/1985	Crimson Crystal	Riddle of the Griffon	Endless Quest: Crimson Crystal Adventures #1	Susan Lawson (pseudonym for Margaret Weis and Roger E. Moore)	0-880382-10-4	Endless Quest Books
03/1985	Crimson Crystal	Search for the Pegasus	Endless Quest: Crimson Crystal Adventures #2	Roger E. Moore	0-880382-11-2	Endless Quest Books
04/1985	Dragonlance	Dragons of Winter Night	Novel	Margaret Weis & Tracy Hickman	0-88038-174-4	The Chronicles Trilogy
04/1985	Dragonlance	Song of the Nine Heroes	Poem	Michael Williams	(Note: This poem is included in the book Dragons of Winter Night.)	The Chronicles Trilogy
04/1985	Dragonlance	Untitled Prayer to Paladine	Poem	Michael Williams		The Chronicles Trilogy
05/1985	AD&D	The Ghost Tower	Adventure Gamebook #2	Jean Blashfield	0880382155 / 9780880382151	Adventure Gamebook
06/1985	AD&D	Escape from Castle Quarras	Adventure Gamebook #3	Douglas Niles	088038252X / 9780880382526	Adventure Gamebook
07/1985	D&D	Tower of Darkness	Endless Quest Book #29	Regina Oehler Fultz	0-8803-204-X	Endless Quest Books
08/1985	Greyhawk	At Moonset Blackcat Comes: A Tale of Gord of Greyhawk	Short story	Gary Gygax	(Note: This short story was originally released in the 100th issue of Dragon magazine.)	
09/1985	AD&D	The Soulforge	Adventure Gamebook #4	Terry Phillips	0880382546 / 9780880382540	Adventure Gamebook
09/1985	Dragonlance	Dragons of Spring Dawning	Novel	Margaret Weis & Tracy Hickman	0-88038-175-2	The Chronicles Trilogy
09/1985	Crimson Crystal	Stop that Witch	Endless Quest: Crimson Crystal Adventures #4	Mary Clark	0-880382-51-1	Endless Quest Books
10/1985	Greyhawk	Saga of Old City	Novel	Gary Gygax	0-88038-257-0	Greyhawk Adventures
10/1985	D&D	The Fireseed	Endless Quest Book #30	Morris Simon	0-88038-171-X	Endless Quest Books
12/1985	Kara-Tur	Test of the Ninja	Adventure Gamebook #5	Curtis Smith	0-88038-260-0	Adventure Gamebook
01/1986	AD&D	Master of Ravenloft	Adventure Gamebook #6	Jean Blashfield	0880382619 / 9780880382618	Adventure Gamebook
02/1986	D&D	Prisoner of Elderwood	Endless Quest Book #32	Bruce Algozin	0-88038-283-X	Endless Quest Books
02/1986	Dragonlance	Time of the Twins	Novel	Margaret Weis & Tracy Hickman	0-88038-265-1	Legends Trilogy
02/1986	Greyhawk	Artifact of Evil	Novel	Gary Gygax	0-88038-279-1	Greyhawk Adventures
03/1986	AD&D	Sceptre of Power	Adventure Gamebook #7	Morris Simon	0880382856 / 9780880382854	Adventure Gamebook
05/1986	AD&D	Nightmare Realm of Baba Yaga	Adventure Gamebook #8	Roger Moore	0880382864 / 9780880382861	Adventure Gamebook
05/1986	Dragonlance	War of the Twins	Novel	Margaret Weis & Tracy Hickman	0-88038-266-X	Legends Trilogy
05/1986	Dragonlance	Song of Huma (Reprise)	Poem	Michael Williams	(Note: This poem is included in the book, War of the Twins.)	Legends Trilogy
06/1986	D&D	Knight of Illusion	Endless Quest Book #33	Mary L. Kirchoff	0-88038-284-8	Endless Quest Books
07/1986	AD&D	The Sorcerer's Crown	Adventure Gamebook #9	Morris Simon	0880383089 / 9780880383080	Adventure Gamebook
08/1986	Dragonlance	Test of the Twins	Novel	Margaret Weis & Tracy Hickman	0-88038-267-8	Legends Trilogy
08/1986	Dragonlance	Crysania's Song	Poem	Michael Williams	(Note: This poem is included in the book, Test of the Twins.)	Legends Trilogy
08/1986	Dragonlance	Lord Soth's Song	Poem	Michael Williams		Legends Trilogy
08/1986	Dragonlance	Wedding Song (A Reprise)	Poem	Michael Williams		Legends Trilogy
09/1986	AD&D	Lords of Doom	Adventure Gamebook #10	Douglas Niles	0880383097 / 9780880383097	Adventure Gamebook
09/1986	D&D	Claw of the Dragon	Endless Quest Book #34	Bruce Algozin	0-88038-306-2	Endless Quest Books
11/1986	AD&D	Clash of the Sorcerers	Adventure Gamebook #11	Morris Simon	0880383100 / 9780880383103	Adventure Gamebook
12/1986	D&D	Vision of Doom	Endless Quest Book #35	Mary L. Kirchoff	0-88038-307-0	Endless Quest Books
02/1987	AD&D	Curse of the Werewolf	Adventure Gamebook #12	Chris Martindale	0880384328 / 9780880384322	Adventure Gamebook
02/1987	Dragonlance	Leaves from the Inn of the Last Home	Collection	Margaret Weis & Tracy Hickman editors (Note: This collection contains recipes, essays, legends and a short story. Authors include Margaret Weis, Tracy Hickman, & Michael Williams.)	0-88038-465-4	Dragonlance: Sourcebooks on Krynn
03/1987	D&D	Song of the Dark Druid	Endless Quest Book #36	Josepha Sherman	0-88038-442-5	Endless Quest Books
03/1987	Dragonlance	The Magic of Krynn	Anthology	Margaret Weis & Tracy Hickman editors	0-88038-454-9	Dragonlance: Tales I
03/1987	Dragonlance	Riverwind and the Crystal Staff	Poem	Michael Williams	(Note: This literary short is part of the anthology The Magic of Krynn.)	Dragonlance: Tales I
03/1987	Dragonlance	The Blood Sea Monster	Short Story	Scott Siegel & Barbara Siegel		Dragonlance: Tales I
03/1987	Dragonlance	A Stone's Throw Away	Short Story	Roger E. Moore		Dragonlance: Tales I
03/1987	Dragonlance	Dreams of Darkness, Dreams of Light	Short Story	Warren B. Smith		Dragonlance: Tales I
03/1987	Dragonlance	Love and Ale	Novelette	Nick O'Donohoe		Dragonlance: Tales I
03/1987	Dragonlance	Wayward Children	Novelette	Richard A. Knaak		Dragonlance: Tales I
03/1987	Dragonlance	The Test of the Twins	Short Story	Margaret Weis		Dragonlance: Tales I
03/1987	Dragonlance	Harvests	Novelette	Nancy Varian Berberick		Dragonlance: Tales I
03/1987	Dragonlance	Finding the Faith	Novelette	Mary Kirchoff		Dragonlance: Tales I
03/1987	Dragonlance	The Legacy	Novella	Margaret Weis & Tracy Hickman		Dragonlance: Tales I
03/1987	Greyhawk	Master Wolf	Novel	Rose Estes	0-88038-457-3	Greyhawk Adventures
05/1987	AD&D	Gates of Death	Adventure Gamebook #13	Terry Phillips	0880384336 / 9780880384339	Adventure Gamebook
05/1987	Forgotten Realms	Darkwalker on Moonshae	Novel	Douglas Niles	088038-451-4	The Moonshae Trilogy
06/1987	Greyhawk	Sea of Death	Novel	Gary Gygax	0-441-75676-X	Gord the Rogue
07/1987	Dragonlance	Kender, Gully Dwarves, and Gnomes	Anthology	Margaret Weis & Tracy Hickman editors	0-88038-382-8	Dragonlance: Tales I
07/1987	Dragonlance	Snowsong	Novelette	Nancy Varian Berberick	(Note: This literary short is part of the anthology, Kender, Gully Dwarves, and Gnomes.)	Dragonlance: Tales I
07/1987	Dragonlance	The Wizard's Spectacles	Novelette	Morris Simon		Dragonlance: Tales I
07/1987	Dragonlance	The Storyteller	Novelette	Barbara Siegel & Scott Siegel		Dragonlance: Tales I
07/1987	Dragonlance	A Shaggy Dog's Tail	Novelette	Danny Peary		Dragonlance: Tales I
07/1987	Dragonlance	Lord Toede's Disastrous Hunt	Novelette	Harold Bakst		Dragonlance: Tales I
07/1987	Dragonlance	Definitions of Honor	Novelette	Richard A. Knaak		Dragonlance: Tales I
07/1987	Dragonlance	Hearth Cat and Winter Wren	Novelette	Nancy Varian Berberick		Dragonlance: Tales I
07/1987	Dragonlance	Wanna Bet?	Novella	Margaret Weis & Tracy Hickman		Dragonlance: Tales I
07/1987	Dragonlance	Into the Heart of the Story	Novelette	Michael Williams		Dragonlance: Tales I
07/1987	Dragonlance	Dagger-Flight	Short Story	Nick O'Donohoe		Dragonlance: Tales I
08/1987	AD&D	Trail Sinister	Adventure Gamebook #14	James Brumbaugh	0880384530 / 9780880384537	Adventure Gamebook
08/1987	Greyhawk	The Price of Power	Novel	Rose Estes	0-88038-458-1	Greyhawk Adventures
09/1987	Greyhawk	Night Arrant	Anthology	Gary Gygax	0-441-29863-X	
09/1987	Greyhawk	The Heart of Darkness	Novelette	Gary Gygax	(Note: This story is part of the anthology Night Arrant.)	
09/1987	Greyhawk	The Weird Occurrence in Odd Alley	Novella	Gary Gygax		
09/1987	Greyhawk	A Revel in Rel Morde	Novelette	Gary Gygax		
09/1987	Greyhawk	The Five Dragon Bowl	Novelette	Gary Gygax		
09/1987	Greyhawk	Twistbuck's Game	Novelette	Gary Gygax		Gord the Rogue (Note: This novelette is part of the Gord the Rogue series after the book Sea of Death and before the book City of Hawks.)
09/1987	Greyhawk	The House in the Tree	Novelette	Gary Gygax		
09/1987	Greyhawk	Cats Versus Rats	Novelette	Gary Gygax		
09/1987	Greyhawk	Love Laughs at Locks	Novelette	Gary Gygax		
09/1987	Greyhawk	Cat or Pigeon?	Novella	Gary Gygax		
10/1987	Dragonlance	Love and War	Anthology	Margaret Weis & Tracy Hickman editors	0-88038-519-7	Dragonlance: Tales I
10/1987	Dragonlance	A Good Knight's Tale	Novelette	Harold Bakst	(Note: This literary short is included in the anthology Love and War.)	Dragonlance: Tales I
10/1987	Dragonlance	A Painter's Vision	Novelette	Barbara Siegel & Scott Siegel		Dragonlance: Tales I
10/1987	Dragonlance	Hunting Destiny	Novelette	Nick O'Donohoe		Dragonlance: Tales I
10/1987	Dragonlance	Hide and Go Seek	Novelette	Nancy Varian Berberick		Dragonlance: Tales I
10/1987	Dragonlance	By the Measure	Novelette	Richard A. Knaak		Dragonlance: Tales I
10/1987	Dragonlance	The Exiles	Novelette	Paul B. Thompson & Tonya R. Carter		Dragonlance: Tales I
10/1987	Dragonlance	Heart of Goldmoon	Novella	Laura Hickman & Kate Novak		Dragonlance: Tales I
10/1987	Dragonlance	Raistlin's Daughter	Novelette	Margaret Weis & Dezra Despain		Dragonlance: Tales I
10/1987	Dragonlance	Silver and Steel	Novelette	Kevin Randle		Dragonlance: Tales I
10/1987	Dragonlance	From the Yearning for War and the War's Ending	Novelette	Michael Williams		Dragonlance: Tales I
11/1987	AD&D	The Vanishing City	Adventure Gamebook #15	Allen Varney	0880384344 / 9780880384346	Adventure Gamebook
11/1987	Greyhawk	City of Hawks	Novel	Gary Gygax	0-441-10636-6	Gord the Rogue
11/1987	Greyhawk	Author's Note (City of Hawks)	Essay	Gary Gygax	(Note: This essay was included in the City of Hawks at the end.)	Gord the Rogue
01/1988	Forgotten Realms	The Crystal Shard	Novel	R. A. Salvatore	0-88038-535-9	The Icewind Dale Trilogy
02/1988	AD&D	Shadow over Nordmaar	Adventure Gamebook #16	Dezra Despain	0880385413 / 9780880385411	Adventure Gamebook
02/1988	Greyhawk	The Demon Hand	Novel	Rose Estes	0-88038-542-1	Greyhawk Adventures
03/1988	Greyhawk	Come Endless Darkness	Novel	Gary Gygax	0-441-11446-6	Greyhawk Adventures
03/1988	Dragonlance	The Legend of Huma (Note: Kaz the Minotaur appears first in The Legend of Huma, then also in Kaz the Minotaur, which is part of the Heroes II series. He also appears in Land of the Minotaurs a novel in the Lost Histories series and finally in the short story Kaz and the Dragon's Children in the book The Dragons of Krynn, which is part of the Dragon Anthologies.)	Novel	Richard A. Knaak	0-88038-548-0	Dragonlance: Heroes I
04/1988	Forgotten Realms	Black Wizards	Novel	Douglas Niles	0-88038-563-4	The Moonshae Trilogy
05/1988	AD&D	Spawn of Dragonspear	Adventure Gamebook #17	Steve Perrin	0880385707 / 9780880385701	Adventure Gamebook
06/1988	Greyhawk	The Name of the Game	Novel	Rose Estes	0-88038-614-2	Greyhawk Adventures
07/1988	Forgotten Realms	Spellfire	Novel	Ed Greenwood	0-88038-587-1	Shandrill's Saga
08/1988	AD&D	Prince of Thieves	Adventure Gamebook #18	Chris Martindale	0880385960 / 9780880385961	Adventure Gamebook
08/1988	Dragonlance	Stormblade	Novel	Nancy Varian Berberick	0-88038-597-9	Dragonlance: Heroes I
10/1988	Forgotten Realms	Azure Bonds	Novel	Kate Novak & Jeff Grubb	0-88038-612-6	The Finder's Stone Trilogy
11/1988	Greyhawk	Dance of Demons	Novel	Gary Gygax	0-425-11342-6	Greyhawk Adventures
12/1988	Dragonlance	Weasel's Luck (Note: This story is continued in Galen Beknighted part of the Dragonlance: Heroes II series.)	Novel	Michael Williams	0-88038-625-8	Dragonlance: Heroes I
01/1989	Forgotten Realms	Streams of Silver	Novel	R. A. Salvatore	0-88038-672-X	The Icewind Dale Trilogy
02/1989	Forgotten Realms	Darkwell	Novel	Douglas Niles	0-88038-717-3	The Moonshae Trilogy
04/1989	Dragonlance	Darkness and Light	Novel	Paul B. Thompson & Tonya R. Carter	0-88038-722-X	Dragonlance: Preludes
04/1989	Forgotten Realms	Shadowdale	Novel	Richard Awlinson	0-88038-730-0	The Avatar Series
06/1989	Forgotten Realms	Tantras	Novel	Richard Awlinson	0-88038-748-3	The Avatar Series
08/1989	Forgotten Realms	Waterdeep	Novel	Richard Awlinson	0-88038-759-9	The Avatar Series
08/1989	Dragonlance	Kendermore	Novel	Mary Kirchoff	0-88038-754-8	Dragonlance: Preludes
08/1989	Dragonlance	Poetry in Kendermore	Poems	Michael Williams	(Note: The unnamed poetry is within the novel Kendermore in the Dragonlance: Preludes series.)	Dragonlance: Preludes
08/1989	Greyhawk	The Eyes Have It	Novel	Rose Estes	0-88038-755-6	Greyhawk Adventures
11/1989	Forgotten Realms	Pool of Radiance	Novel	James M. Ward & Jane Cooper Hong	0-88038-735-1	The Pools
12/1989	Dragonlance	Brothers Majere	Novel	Kevin T. Stein	0-88038-776-9	Dragonlance: Preludes

== 1990s ==
1990s
Date	Setting	Title	Type	Author(s)	ISBN	Series
01/1990	Forgotten Realms	The Halfling's Gem	Novel	R. A. Salvatore	0-88038-901-X	The Icewind Dale Trilogy
01/1990	Dragonlance	Riverwind the Plainsman	Novel	Paul B. Thompson & Tonya R. Carter	0-88038-909-5	Dragonlance: Preludes II
02/1990	Forgotten Realms	The Wyvern's Spur	Novel	Kate Novak & Jeff Grubb	0-88038-902-8	The Finder's Stone Trilogy
03/1990	Forgotten Realms	Ironhelm	Novel	Douglas Niles	0-88038-903-6	Maztica Trilogy
04/1990	Forgotten Realms	Horselords	Novel	David Cook	0-88038-904-4	The Empires Trilogy
04/1990	Dragonlance	Kaz the Minotaur	Novel	Richard A. Knaak	0-88038-910-9	Dragonlance: Heroes II
05/1990	Dragonlance	Flint the King	Novel	Mary Kirchoff & Douglas Niles	0-88038-911-7	Dragonlance: Preludes II
07/1990	Forgotten Realms (Note: This novel officially takes place within Shou Lung in the realm of Kara-tur.)	Dragonwall	Novel	Troy Denning	0-88038-919-2	The Empires Trilogy
07/1990	Dragonlance	The Gates of Thorbardin	Novel	Dan Parkinson	0-88038-912-5	Dragonlance: Heroes II
08/1990	Forgotten Realms	Homeland	Novel	R. A. Salvatore	0-88038-905-2	The Dark Elf Trilogy
08/1990	Forgotten Realms	Viperhand	Novel	Douglas Niles	0-88038-907-9	Maztica Trilogy
11/1990	Dragonlance	Tanis, the Shadow Years	Novel	Barbara Siegel & Scott Siegel	0-88038-913-3	Dragonlance: Preludes II
12/1990	Forgotten Realms	Exile	Novel	R. A. Salvatore	0-88038-920-6	The Dark Elf Trilogy
12/1990	Dragonlance	Galen Beknighted	Novel	Michael Williams	0-88038-921-4	Dragonlance: Heroes II
01/1991	Forgotten Realms	Crusade	Novel	James Lowder	0-88038-908-7	The Empires Trilogy
02/1991	Dragonlance	Firstborn (Dragonlance)	Novel	Paul B. Thompson & Tonya C. Cook	1-56076-051-6	The Elven Nations Trilogy
03/1991	Forgotten Realms	Song of the Saurials	Novel	Kate Novak & Jeff Grubb	1-56076-060-5	The Finder's Stone Trilogy
04/1991	Forgotten Realms	Feathered Dragon	Novel	Douglas Niles	1-56076-045-1	Maztica Trilogy
04/1991	Dragonlance	Kindred Spirits	Novel	Mark Anthony & Ellen Porath	1-56076-069-9	The Meetings Sextet
05/1991	Forgotten Realms	Sojourn	Novel	R. A. Salvatore	1-56076-047-8	The Dark Elf Trilogy
07/1991	Spelljammer	Beyond the Moons	Novel	David Cook	1-56076-153-9	The Cloakmaster Cycle
07/1991	Forgotten Realms	The Parched Sea	Novel	Troy Denning	1-56076-067-2	The Harpers
08/1991	Dragonlance	The Kinslayer Wars	Novel	Douglas Niles	1-56076-113-X	The Elven Nations Trilogy
09/1991	Dragonlance	Wanderlust	Novel	Mary Kirchoff & Steve Winter	1-56076-115-6	The Meetings Sextet
09/1991	Ravenloft	Vampire of the Mists	Novel	Christie Golden	1-56076-155-5	
09/1991	Spelljammer	Into the Void	Novel	Nigel Findley	1-56076-154-7	The Cloakmaster Cycle
10/1991	Dark Sun	The Verdant Passage	Novel	Troy Denning	1-56076-121-0	The Prism Pentad
10/1991	Forgotten Realms	Canticle	Novel	R. A. Salvatore	1-56076-119-9	The Cleric Quintet
10/1991	Forgotten Realms	Elfshadow	Novel	Elaine Cunningham	1-56076-117-2	The Harpers & Songs & Swords (Note: This novel was re-released later as part of the Songs & Swords series, which consists of 4 re-releases and 1 new novel.)
11/1991	Dragonlance	The Qualinesti	Novel	Paul B. Thompson & Tonya R. Carter	1-56076-114-8	Elven Nations
12/1991	Ravenloft (Note: This book involves Lord Soth as he crosses between the realms of Ravenloft and Dragonlance.)	Knight of the Black Rose	Novel	James Lowder	1-56076-156-3	
12/1991	Forgotten Realms	Red Magic	Novel	Jean Rabe	1-56076-118-0	The Harpers
01/1992	Dragonlance	Dark Heart	Novel	Tina Daniell	1-56076-116-4	The Meetings Sextet
02/1992	Forgotten Realms	Pools of Darkness	Novel	James M. Ward & Anne K. Brown	1-56076-318-3	The Pools
03/1992	Forgotten Realms	Prophet of Moonshae	Novel	Douglas Niles	1-56076-319-1	The Druidhome Trilogy
04/1992	Dark Sun	The Crimson Legion	Novel	Troy Denning	1-56076-260-8	Prism Pentad
04/1992	Dragonlance	The Reign of Istar	Anthology	Margaret Weis & Tracy Hickman editors	1-56076-326-4	Dragonlance: Tales II
04/1992	Dragonlance	Six Songs for the Temple of Istar	Poem	Michael Williams	(Note: This literary short is part of the anthology The Reign of Istar from the Dragonlance: Tales II series.)	Dragonlance: Tales II
04/1992	Dragonlance	Colors of Belief	Novelette	Richard A. Knaak		Dragonlance: Tales II
04/1992	Dragonlance	Kender Stew	Short Story	Nick O'Donohoe		Dragonlance: Tales II
04/1992	Dragonlance	The Goblin's Wish	Short Story	Roger E. Moore		Dragonlance: Tales II
04/1992	Dragonlance	The Three Lives of Horgan Oxthrall	Novelette	Douglas Niles		Dragonlance: Tales II
04/1992	Dragonlance	Filling the Empty Places	Novelette	Nancy Varian Berberick		Dragonlance: Tales II
04/1992	Dragonlance	Off Day	Novelette	Dan Parkinson		Dragonlance: Tales II
04/1992	Dragonlance	The Silken Threads	Novella	Margaret Weis, & Tracy Hickman		Dragonlance: Tales II
04/1992	Dragonlance	The Oath and the Measure (Excerpt)	Short Story	Michael Williams		Dragonlance: Tales II
04/1992	Forgotten Realms	In Sylvan Shadows	Novel	R. A. Salvatore	1-56076-321-3	The Cleric Quintet
05/1992	Dragonlance	The Oath and the Measure	Novel	Michael Williams	1-56076-336-1	The Meetings Sextet
05/1992	Spelljammer	The Maelstrom's Eye	Novel	Roger E. Moore	1-56076-344-2	The Cloakmaster Cycle
06/1992	Forgotten Realms	The Night Parade	Novel	Scott Ciencin	1-56076-323-X	The Harpers
07/1992	Ravenloft	Dance of the Dead	Novel	Christie Golden	1-56076-352-3	
07/1992	Dragonlance	The Cataclysm	Anthology	Margaret Weis & Tracy Hickman editors	1-56076-430-9	Dragonlance: Tales II
07/1992	Dragonlance	The Word and the Silence	Poem	Michael Williams	(Note: This literary short is contained within the anthology The Cataclysm from the Dragonlance: Tales II series.)	Dragonlance: Tales II
07/1992	Dragonlance	Mark of the Flame, Mark of the Word	Short Story	Michael Williams & Teri Williams		Dragonlance: Tales II
07/1992	Dragonlance	The Bargain Driver	Short Story	Mark Anthony		Dragonlance: Tales II
07/1992	Dragonlance	Seekers	Short Story	Todd Fahnestock		Dragonlance: Tales II
07/1992	Dragonlance	No Gods, No Heroes	Novelette	Nick O'Donohoe		Dragonlance: Tales II
07/1992	Dragonlance	Into Shadow, Into Light	Short Story	Richard A. Knaak		Dragonlance: Tales II
07/1992	Dragonlance	Ogre Unaware	Novelette	Dan Parkinson		Dragonlance: Tales II
07/1992	Dragonlance	The Cobler's Son [sic]	Short Story	Roger E. Moore		Dragonlance: Tales II
07/1992	Dragonlance	The Voyage of the Sunchaser	Short Story	Tonya R. Carter & Paul B. Thompson		Dragonlance: Tales II
07/1992	Dragonlance	The High Priest of Halcyon	Short Story	Douglas Niles		Dragonlance: Tales II
07/1992	Dragonlance	True Knight	Novella	Margaret Weis, & Tracy Hickman		Dragonlance: Tales II
08/1992	Forgotten Realms	Night Masks	Novel	R. A. Salvatore	1-56076-328-0	The Cleric Quintet
08/1992	Forgotten Realms	The Legacy (An Excerpt)	Novel	R. A. Salvatore	(Note: This preview of The Legacy is included within Night Masks.)	The Cleric Quintet
09/1992	Dragonlance	Steel and Stone	Novel	Ellen Porath	1-56076-339-6	The Meetings Sextet
09/1992	Forgotten Realms	The Coral Kingdom	Novel	Douglas Niles	1-56076-332-9	The Druidhome Trilogy
09/1992	Forgotten Realms	The Legacy	Novel	R. A. Salvatore	1-56076-529-1	Legacy of the Drow
10/1992	Mystara	The Tainted Sword	Novel	D.J. Heinrich	1-56076-395-7	Penhaligon Trilogy
10/1992	Dark Sun	The Amber Enchantress	Novel	Troy Denning	1-56076-236-5	The Prism Pentad
11/1992	Dragonlance	The War of the Lance	Anthology	Margaret Weis & Tracy Hickman editors	1-56076-431-7	Dragonlance: Tales II
11/1992	Dragonlance	Lorac	Poem	Michael Williams	(Note: This literary short is part of the anthology The War of the Lance in the Dragonlance: Tales II series.)	Dragonlance: Tales II
11/1992	Dragonlance	Raistlin and the Knight of Solamnia	Short Story	Margaret Weis, & Tracy Hickman		Dragonlance: Tales II
11/1992	Dragonlance	Dean on Target	Short Story	Roger E. Moore		Dragonlance: Tales II
11/1992	Dragonlance	War Machines	Short Story	Nick O'Donohoe		Dragonlance: Tales II
11/1992	Dragonlance	The Promised Place	Short Story	Dan Parkinson		Dragonlance: Tales II
11/1992	Dragonlance	Clockwork Hero	Novelette	Jeff Grubb		Dragonlance: Tales II
11/1992	Dragonlance	The Night Wolf	Short Story	Nancy Varian Berberick		Dragonlance: Tales II
11/1992	Dragonlance	The Potion Sellers	Short Story	Mark Anthony		Dragonlance: Tales II
11/1992	Dragonlance	The Hand That Feeds	Short Story	Richard Knaak		Dragonlance: Tales II
11/1992	Dragonlance	The Vingaard Campaigns	Short Story	Douglas Niles		Dragonlance: Tales II
11/1992	Dragonlance	The Story That Tasslehoff Promised He Would Never, Ever, Ever, Tell	Novella	Margaret Weis, & Tracy Hickman		Dragonlance: Tales II
11/1992	Spelljammer	The Radiant Dragon	Novel	Elaine Cunningham	1-56076-346-9	The Cloakmaster Cycle
11/1992	Forgotten Realms	The Ring of Winter	Novel	James Lowder	1-56076-330-2	The Harpers
12/1992	Ravenloft	Heart of Midnight	Novel	J. Robert King	1-56076-355-8	
1993	Mystara	The Known World Grimoire	Comic	Bruce Heard	[nb]	Dragon Magazine #189-200
1993	Mystara	Champions of Mystara: Heroes of the Princess Ark	Comic	Bruce Heard	[nb]	Dragon Magazine #169-188
1993	Mystara	Warrior's Tale	Novel	Michael Andrews		Dragonstrike
1993	Mystara	Wizard's Tale	Novel	Michael Andrews		Dragonstrike
1993	Mystara	Elf's Tale	Novel	Michael Andrews		Dragonstrike
1993	Mystara	Thief's Tale	Novel	Michael Andrews		Dragonstrike
01/1993	Dragonlance	The Companions	Novel	Tina Daniell	1-56076-340-X	The Meetings Sextet
02/1993	Forgotten Realms	Realms of Valor	Anthology	James Lowder (editor)	1-56076-557-7	Forgotten Realms
02/1993	Forgotten Realms	The Lord of Lowhill	Novelette	Douglas Niles	(Note: This literary short was released in the anthology Realms of Valor.)	
02/1993	Forgotten Realms	Elminster at the Magefair	Novelette	Ed Greenwood		Sage of Shadowdale & The Elminster Series & Forgotten Realms
02/1993	Forgotten Realms	One Last Drink	Novelette	Christie Golden		Forgotten Realms
02/1993	Forgotten Realms	The Bargain	Novelette	Elaine Cunningham		Forgotten Realms
02/1993	Forgotten Realms	Patronage	Novelette	David Cook		Forgotten Realms
02/1993	Forgotten Realms	A Virtue By Reflection	Novelette	Scott Ciencin		Forgotten Realms
02/1993	Forgotten Realms	King's Tear	Novelette	Mark Anthony		Forgotten Realms
02/1993	Forgotten Realms	The Family Business	Novelette	James Lowder		Forgotten Realms
02/1993	Forgotten Realms	Grandfather's Toys	Novelette	Jean Rabe		Forgotten Realms
02/1993	Forgotten Realms	The Curse of Tegea	Novelette	Troy Denning		Forgotten Realms
02/1993	Forgotten Realms	Dark Mirror	Novelette	R. A. Salvatore		Forgotten Realms
02/1993	Forgotten Realms	Afterword: The (Not-So) Secret History of the Realms	Essay	Jeff Grubb		Forgotten Realms
02/1993	Dragonlance	The Covenant of the Forge	Novel	Dan Parkinson	1-56076-558-5	Dwarven Nations Trilogy
03/1993	Forgotten Realms	The Druid Queen	Novel	Douglas Niles	1-56076-568-2	The Druidhome Trilogy
03/1993	Ravenloft	Tapestry of Dark Souls	Novel	Elaine Bergstrom	1-56076-571-2	
03/1993	Forgotten Realms	Crypt of the Shadowking	Novel	Mark Anthony	1-56076-594-1	The Harpers
04/1993	Mystara	The Dragon's Tomb	Novel	D.J. Heinrich	1-56076-592-5	The Penhaligon Trilogy
04/1993	Dragonlance	Before the Mask	Novel	Michael Williams & Teri Williams	1-56076-583-6	Villains
05/1993	Spelljammer	The Broken Sphere	Novel	Nigel Findley	1-56076-596-8	The Cloakmaster Cycle
06/1993	Dark Sun	The Obsidian Oracle	Novel	Troy Denning	1-56076-603-4	Prism Pentad
06/1993	Forgotten Realms	The Fallen Fortress	Novel	R. A. Salvatore	1-56076-419-8	The Cleric Quintet
06/1993	Forgotten Realms	Starless Night (An Excerpt) (Note: This preview is from the Legacy of the Drow series.)	Novel	R. A. Salvatore	1-56076-419-8	Legacy of the Drow
07/1993	Dragonlance	Hammer and Axe	Novel	Dan Parkinson	1-56076-627-1	Dwarven Nations Trilogy
07/1993	Ravenloft	Carnival of Fear	Novel	J. Robert King	1-56076-628-X	
08/1993	Forgotten Realms	Prince of Lies	Novel	James Lowder	1-56076-626-3	The Avatar Series
08/1993	Forgotten Realms	Starless Night	Novel	R. A. Salvatore	1-56076-653-0	Legacy of the Drow
09/1993	Spelljammer	The Ultimate Helm	Novel	Russ T. Howard	1-56076-651-4	The Cloakmaster Cycle
09/1993	Dragonlance	The Black Wing	Novel	Mary Kirchoff	1-56076-650-6	Dragonlance: Villains
09/1993	Ravenloft	I, Strahd: The Memoirs of a Vampire	Novel	P.N. Elrod	1-56076-670-0	I, Strahd
09/1993	Dark Sun	The Cerulean Storm	Novel	Troy Denning	1-56076-642-5	The Prism Pentad
10/1993	Mystara	The Fall of Magic	Novel	D.J. Heinrich	1-56076-663-8	The Penhaligon Trilogy
11/1993	Forgotten Realms	Pool of Twilight	Novel	James M. Ward & Anne K. Brown	1-56076-582-8	The Pools
12/1993	Dark Sun	The Outcast	Novel	Simon Hawke	1-56076-676-X	Tribe of One
12/1993	Forgotten Realms	Soldiers of Ice	Novel	David Cook	1-56076-641-7	The Harpers
12/1993	Dragonlance	Emperor of Ansalon	Novel	Douglas Niles	1-56076-680-8	Dragonlance: Villains
12/1993	Dragonlance	The Swordsheath Scroll	Novel	Dan Parkinson	1-56076-686-7	Dwarven Nations Trilogy
1994	Before the Strike	Before the Strike	Novel	Jeff Grubb		Dragonstrike
1994	Dragon Strike	Dungeon of Fear	Endless Quest Book #37	Michael Andrews	1-560768-35-5	Endless Quest Books
1994	Ravenloft	Castle of the Undead	Endless Quest Book #38	Nick Baron	1-560768-36-3	Endless Quest Books
1994	Al-Qadim	Secret of the Djinn	Endless Quest Book #39	Jean Rabe	1-560768-64-9	Endless Quest Books
1994	Greyhawk	The Siege of the Tower	Endless Quest Book #40	Kem Antilles	1-560768-94-0	Endless Quest Books
1994	Wildspace	A Wild Ride	Endless Quest Book #41	Louis Anderson	1-560769-28-9	Endless Quest Books
1994	Dragon Strike	Forest of Darkness	Endless Quest Book #42	Michael Andrews	1-560769-32-7	Endless Quest Books
01/1994	Forgotten Realms	Elfsong	Novel	Elaine Cunningham	1-56076-679-4	The Harpers & Songs & Swords
02/1994	Dragonlance	Hederick the Theocrat	Novel	Ellen Dodge Severson	1-56076-817-7	Dragonlance: Villains
02/1994	Ravenloft	The Enemy Within	Novel	Christie Golden	1-56076-887-8	
02/1994	Dragonlance	The Second Generation	Anthology	Margaret Weis & Tracy Hickman	1-56076-822-3	The Second Generation (Note: This collection of stories and poems spans the time between The Chronicles Trilogy and The Legends Trilogy.)
02/1994	Dragonlance	Prologue	Poem	Michael Williams	(Note: This literary short is part of the anthology, The Second Generation.)	The Second Generation
02/1994	Dragonlance	I	Poem	Michael Williams		The Second Generation
02/1994	Dragonlance	Kitiara's Son	Novella	Margaret Weis & Tracy Hickman		The Second Generation
02/1994	Dragonlance	II	Poem	Michael Williams		The Second Generation
02/1994	Dragonlance	The Legacy	Novella	Margaret Weis & Tracy Hickman		The Second Generation
02/1994	Dragonlance	III	Poem	Michael Williams		The Second Generation
02/1994	Dragonlance	Wanna Bet?	Novella	Margaret Weis & Tracy Hickman		The Second Generation
02/1994	Dragonlance	IV	Poem	Michael Williams		The Second Generation
02/1994	Dragonlance	Raistlin's Daughter	Novelette	Margaret Weis & Tracy Hickman		The Second Generation
02/1994	Dragonlance	V	Poem	Michael Williams		The Second Generation
02/1994	Dragonlance	The Sacrifice	Novella	Margaret Weis & Tracy Hickman		The Second Generation
02/1994	Dragonlance	Epilogue	Poem	Michael Williams		The Second Generation
02/1994	Dragonlance	Song of Huma	Poem (Note: This poem was written with music.)	Michael Williams		The Second Generation
02/1994	Dragonlance	Knights of Takhisis: Dark Warriors	Essay (Note: This essay is in actuality an amended set of rules for Advance Dungeons & Dragons.)	Margaret Weis & Tracy Hickman		The Second Generation
03/1994	Dragonlance	The Dragons of Krynn	Anthology	Margaret Weis & Tracy Hickman editors	1-56076-830-4	The Dragons Anthologies
03/1994	Dragonlance	Seven Hymns of the Dragon	Poem	Michael Williams	(Note: This literary short is part of the anthology The Dragons of Krynn.)	The Dragons Anthologies
03/1994	Dragonlance	The Final Touch	Novelette	Michael Williams & Teri Williams		The Dragons Anthologies
03/1994	Dragonlance	Night of Falling Stars	Novelette	Nancy Varian Berberick		The Dragons Anthologies
03/1994	Dragonlance	Honor Is All	Short story	Mickey Zucker Reichert		The Dragons Anthologies
03/1994	Dragonlance	Easy Pickings	Short story	Douglas Niles		The Dragons Anthologies
03/1994	Dragonlance	A Dragon to the Core	Novella	Robert E. Moore		The Dragons Anthologies
03/1994	Dragonlance	Dragon Breath	Novelette	Nick O'Donohoe		The Dragons Anthologies
03/1994	Dragonlance	Fool's Gold	Novelette	Jeff Grubb		The Dragons Anthologies
03/1994	Dragonlance	Scourge the Wicked Kendragon	Short story	Janet Pack		The Dragons Anthologies
03/1994	Dragonlance	And Baby Makes Three	Short story	Amy Stout		The Dragons Anthologies
03/1994	Dragonlance	The First Dragonarmy Bridging Company	Novelette	Don Perrin		The Dragons Anthologies
03/1994	Dragonlance	The Middle of Nowhere	Novelette	Dan Harnden		The Dragons Anthologies
03/1994	Dragonlance	Kaz and the Dragon's Children	Novelette	Richard A. Knaak		The Dragons Anthologies
03/1994	Dragonlance	Into the Light	Novelette	Linda P. Baker		The Dragons Anthologies
03/1994	Dragonlance	The Best	Short story	Margaret Weis		The Dragons Anthologies
03/1994	Dragonlance	The Hunt	Short story	Kevin Stein		The Dragons Anthologies
04/1994	Dark Sun	The Seeker	Novel	Simon Hawke	1-56076-701-4	Tribe of One
04/1994	Dragonlance	Night of the Eye	Novel	Mary Kirchoff	1-56076-840-1	Defenders of Magic Trilogy
04/1994	Forgotten Realms	Crown of Fire	Novel	Ed Greenwood	1-56076-839-8	The Harpers & Shandril's Saga (Note: This novel was re-released as book 2 of the Shandril's Saga.)
04/1994	Forgotten Realms	Ed's (Elminster's) Afterword	Essay	Ed Greenwood	(Note: This essay is at the end of the novel Crown of Fire.)	The Harpers & Shandril's Saga
05/1994	Ravenloft	Mordenheim	Novel	Chet Williamson	1-56076-852-5	
06/1994	Forgotten Realms	The Chaos Curse	Novel	R. A. Salvatore	1-56076-860-6	The Cleric Quintet
06/1994	Forgotten Realms	Siege of Darkness (An Excerpt)	Short story	R. A. Salvatore	(Note: This preview was released at the end of the novel, The Chaos Curse.)	Legacy of the Drow
07/1994	Dark Sun	The Brazen Gambit	Novel	Lynn Abbey	1-56076-872-X	Chronicles of Athas
07/1994	Dragonlance	Lord Toede	Novel	Jeff Grubb	1-56076-870-3	Dragonlance: Villains
07/1994	Mystara	Dragonlord of Mystara	Novel	Thorarinn Gunnarsson	1-56076-906-8	The Dragonlord Chronicles
08/1994	Forgotten Realms	Siege of Darkness	Novel	R. A. Salvatore	1-56076-888-6	Legacy of the Drow
09/1994	Ravenloft	Tales of Ravenloft	Anthology	Brian Thomsen	1-56076-931-9	
09/1994	Ravenloft	The Crucible of Dr. Rudolph van Richten	Short story	David Wise	(Note: This literary short is part of the anthology Tales of Ravenloft.)	
09/1994	Ravenloft	The Vanished Ones	Short story	Chet Williamson		
09/1994	Ravenloft	The House of a Hundred Windows	Short story	Mark Anthony		
09/1994	Ravenloft	Song Snatcher	Short story	Elaine Cunningham		
09/1994	Ravenloft	Undefiled	Short story	James M. Ward		
09/1994	Ravenloft	The Briar at the Window	Short story	Roger E. Moore		
09/1994	Ravenloft	Nocturne	Short story	Allen C. Kupfer		
09/1994	Ravenloft	The Wailing	Short story	Kate Novak		
09/1994	Ravenloft	Von Kharkov	Short story	Gene DeWeese		
09/1994	Ravenloft	Sight and Sound	Short story	D. J. Heinrich		
09/1994	Ravenloft	The Judgement of abd-al-Mamat	Short story	Jeff Grubb		
09/1994	Ravenloft	The Rigor of the Game	Short story	James Lowder		
09/1994	Ravenloft	Cold, Hard Silver	Short story	Juanita Coulson		
09/1994	Ravenloft	Objets d'Art	Short story	J. Robert King		
09/1994	Ravenloft	The Freak	Novelette	Nick Pollotta		
09/1994	Ravenloft	The Weaver's Pride	Short story	Elaine Bergstrom		
09/1994	Ravenloft	The Glass Man	Short story	William W. Connors		
09/1994	Ravenloft	Dark Tryst	Novelette	Andria Cardarelle		
09/1994	Ravenloft	Caretaker	Short story	P. N. Elrod		I, Strahd
09/1994	Forgotten Realms	The Ogre's Pact	Novel	Troy Denning	1-56076-891-6	The Twilight Giants Trilogy
10/1994	Dragonlance	The Medusa Plague	Novel	Mary Kirchoff	1-56076-905-X	Defenders of Magic Trilogy
10/1994	Dark Sun	The Nomad	Novel	Simon Hawke	1-56076-702-2	Tribe of One
11/1994	Ravenloft	Tower of Doom	Novel	Mark Anthony	0-7869-0062-8	
12/1994	Dragonlance	The Dark Queen	Novel	Michael Williams & Teri Williams	1-56076-925-4	Dragonlance: Villains
12/1994	Forgotten Realms	Realms of Infamy	Anthology	James Lowder editor	1-56076-911-4	Forgotten Realms
12/1994	Forgotten Realms	So High a Price	Novelette	Ed Greenwood	(Note: This short story was released in Realms of Infamy.)	
12/1994	Forgotten Realms	The More Things Change	Short Story	Elaine Cunningham		
12/1994	Forgotten Realms	The Meaning of Lore	Short Story	Barb Hendee		
12/1994	Forgotten Realms	Raven's Egg	Short Story	Elaine Bergstrom		
12/1994	Forgotten Realms	The Third Level	Novelette	R. A. Salvatore		
12/1994	Forgotten Realms	Blood Sport	Short Story	Christie Golden		
12/1994	Forgotten Realms	Gallows Day	Novelette	David Cook		
12/1994	Forgotten Realms	A Matter of Thorns	Short Story	James M. Ward		
12/1994	Forgotten Realms	Stolen Spells	Short Story	Denise Vitola		
12/1994	Forgotten Realms	The Greatest Hero Who Ever Died	Short Story	J. Robert King		
12/1994	Forgotten Realms	Twilight	Novelette	Troy Denning		
12/1994	Forgotten Realms	The Walls of Midnight	Novelette	Mark Anthony		
12/1994	Forgotten Realms	And Wringing of Hands	Novelette	Jane Cooper Hong		
12/1994	Forgotten Realms	Thieves' Honor	Short Story	Mary H. Herbert		
12/1994	Forgotten Realms	Laughter In the Flames	Novelette	James Lowder		
12/1994	Forgotten Realms	Vision	Novelette	Roger E. Moore		
12/1994	Forgotten Realms	Elminster: The Making of a Mage	Novel	Ed Greenwood	1-56076-936-X	The Elminster Series & Sage of Shadowdale
1995	Ravenloft	Night of the Tiger	Endless Quest Book #44	Jean Rabe	0-099540-81-9 0-786901-14-4	Endless Quest Book
1995	Greyhawk	Bigby's Curse	Endless Quest Book #46	Anne K Brown	0-786901-78-0	Endless Quest Book
01/1995	Dragonlance	The Kagonesti	Novel	Douglas Niles	0-7869-0091-1	The Lost Histories
02/1995	Dark Sun	The Darkness Before the Dawn	Novel	Ryan Hughes	0-7869-0104-7	Chronicles of Athas
02/1995	Mystara	Rogues to Riches	Novel	J. Robert King	1-56076-825-8	First Quest
02/1995	Mystara	The Unicorn Hunt	Novel	Elaine Cunningham		First Quest
02/1995	Forgotten Realms	The Giant Among Us	Novel	Troy Denning	0-7869-0098-9	The Twilight Giants Trilogy
03/1995	Ravenloft	Baroness of Blood	Novel	Elaine Bergstrom	0-7869-0146-2	
03/1995	Dragonlance	Knights of the Crown	Novel	Roland Green	0-7869-0108-X	Dragonlance: Warriors
03/1995	Forgotten Realms	Shadows of Doom	Novel	Ed Greenwood	0-7869-0300-7	The Shadow of the Avatar Trilogy
04/1995	Forgotten Realms	Once Around the Realms	Guide	Brian Thomsen	0-7869-0119-5	
05/1995	Mystara	Pawns Prevail	Novel	Douglas Niles		First Quest
05/1995	Mystara	Son of Dawn	Novel	Dixie Lee McKeone	1-56076-884-3	First Quest
05/1995	Dark Sun	The Broken Blade	Novel	Simon Hawke	0-7869-0137-3	Chronicles of Athas
05/1995	Forgotten Realms	King Pinch	Novel	David Cook	0-7869-0127-6	Forgotten Realms: Nobles
06/1995	Forgotten Realms	Cloak of Shadows	Novel	Ed Greenwood	0-7869-0301-5	The Shadow of the Avatar Trilogy
06/1995	Dragonlance	The Irda	Novel	Linda P. Baker	0-7869-0138-1	The Lost Histories
06/1995	Ravenloft	Death of a Darklord	Novel	Laurell K. Hamilton	0-7869-0112-8	
07/1995	Dragonlance	Maquesta Kar-Thon	Novel	Tina Daniell	0-7869-0134-9	Dragonlance: Warriors
07/1995	Mystara	Dragonking of Mystara	Novel	Thorarinn Gunnarsson	0-7869-0153-5	The Dragonlord Chronicles
07/1995	Dark Sun	Cinnabar Shadows	Novel	Lynn Abbey	0-7869-0181-0	Chronicles of Athas
07/1995	Forgotten Realms	Masquerades	Novel	Kate Novak & Jeff Grubb	0-7869-0152-7	The Harpers
08/1995	Mystara	Suitors Duel	Novel	Douglas Niles		First Quest
08/1995	Dragonlance	The Seventh Sentinel	Novel	Mary Kirchoff	0-7869-0117-9	Defenders of Magic Trilogy
08/1995	Forgotten Realms	Daughter of the Drow	Novel	Elaine Cunningham	0-7869-0165-9	Starlight and Shadows
08/1995	Birthright (campaign setting)	The Iron Throne	Novel	Simon Hawke	0-7869-0357-0	
09/1995	Forgotten Realms	The Titan of Twilight	Novel	Troy Denning	0-7869-0172-1	The Twilight Giants Trilogy
10/1995	Forgotten Realms	All Shadows Fled	Novel	Ed Greenwood	0-7869-0302-3	The Shadow of the Avatar Trilogy
10/1995	Dragonlance	The Dargonesti	Novel	Paul B. Thompson & Tonya Cook	0-7869-0182-9	The Lost Histories
10/1995	Mystara	Dark Knight of Karameikos	Novel	Timothy Brown	0-7869-0307-4	
10/1995	Forgotten Realms	War in Tethyr	Novel	Victor Milán	0-7869-0184-5	Forgotten Realms: Nobles
11/1995	Dragonlance	Dragons of Summer Flame	Novel	Margaret Weis & Tracy Hickman	0-7869-0189-6	The Second Generation (Note: This book is a prequel to the War of Souls Trilogy.)
11/1995	Forgotten Realms	Curse of the Shadowmage	Novel	Mark Anthony	0-7869-0191-8	The Harpers
11/1995	Mystara	Summerhill Hounds	Novel	J Robert King		First Quest
12/1995	Dragonlance	Knights of the Sword	Novel	Roland Green	0-7869-0202-7	Dragonlance: Warriors
12/1995	Dragonlance	Dragons of Summer Flame (An Excerpt)	Novel	Margaret Weis & Tracy Hickman	(Note: This preview was released in the back of the novel Knights of the Sword.)	The Second Generation
12/1995	Ravenloft	Scholar of Decay	Novel	Tanya Huff	0-7869-0206-X	
12/1995	Forgotten Realms	Realms of Magic	Anthology	Brian Thomsen & J. Robert King editors	0-7869-0303-1	Forgotten Realms
12/1995	Forgotten Realms	Prologue	Short Story	Brian Thomsen	(Note: This literary short is contained in the anthology Realms of Magic.)	
12/1995	Forgotten Realms	Guenhwyvar	Novelette	R. A. Salvatore		
12/1995	Forgotten Realms	Smoke Powder and Mirrors	Short Story	Jeff Grubb		
12/1995	Forgotten Realms	The Magic Thief	Short Story	Mark Anthony		
12/1995	Forgotten Realms	The Quiet Place	Short Story	Christie Golden		
12/1995	Forgotten Realms	The Eye of the Dragon	Novelette	Ed Greenwood		
12/1995	Forgotten Realms	Every Dog His Day	Short Story	Dave Gross		
12/1995	Forgotten Realms	The Common Spell	Short Story	Kate Novak-Grubb		
12/1995	Forgotten Realms	The First Moonwell	Short Story	Douglas Niles		
12/1995	Forgotten Realms	The Luck of Llewellyn the Loquacious	Short Story	Allen C. Kupfer		
12/1995	Forgotten Realms	Too Familiar	Short Story	David Cook		
12/1995	Forgotten Realms	Red Ambition	Short Story	Jean Rabe		
12/1995	Forgotten Realms	Thieves' Reward	Novelette	Mary H. Herbert		
12/1995	Forgotten Realms	Six of Swords	Short Story	William W. Connors		
12/1995	Forgotten Realms	The Wild Bunch	Short Story	Tom Dupree		
12/1995	Forgotten Realms	A Worm Too Soft	Novelette	J. Robert King		
12/1995	Forgotten Realms	Gunne Runner	Novelette	Roger E. Moore		
12/1995	Forgotten Realms	The Direct Approach	Novelette	Elaine Cunningham		
12/1995	Forgotten Realms	Epilogue	Short Story	Brian Thomsen		
1996	Planescape	Fire and Dust	Online Novel	James Alan Gardner	(Note: This novel can be found on http://www.planewalker.com.)	
01/1996	Dragonlance	Land of the Minotaurs	Novel	Richard A. Knaak	0-7869-0472-0	The Lost Histories
01/1996	Planescape	Blood Hostages	Novel	J. Robert King	0-7869-0473-9	Blood Wars Trilogy
02/1996	Mystara	Immortal Game	Novel	Douglas Niles		First Quest
02/1996	Birthright	Greatheart	Novel	Dixie Lee McKeone	0-7869-0480-1	
02/1996	Forgotten Realms	Escape from Undermountain	Novel	Mark Anthony	0-7869-0477-1	Forgotten Realms: Nobles
03/1996	Dragonlance	Theros Ironfeld	Novel	Don Perrin	0-7869-0481-X	Dragonlance: Warriors
03/1996	Ravenloft	King of the Dead	Novel	Gene DeWeese	0-7869-0483-6	
03/1996	Forgotten Realms	Murder in Cormyr	Novel	Chet Williamson	0-7869-0486-0	Forgotten Realms: Mysteries
03/1996	Dark Sun	The Rise and Fall of a Dragon King	Novel	Lynn Abbey	0-7869-0476-3	Chronicles of Athas
03/1996	Forgotten Realms	The Veiled Dragon	Novel	Troy Denning	0-7869-0482-8	The Harpers
04/1996	Forgotten Realms	Tangled Webs	Novel	Elaine Cunningham	0-7869-0516-6	Starlight and Shadows
04/1996	Mystara	Dragonmage of Mystara	Novel	Thorarinn Gunnarsson	0-7869-0488-7	The Dragonlord Chronicles
04/1996	Forgotten Realms	Realms of the Underdark	Anthology	J. Robert King editor	0-7869-0487-9	Forgotten Realms
04/1996	Forgotten Realms	Preface: At the Publishing House	Short Story	Brian M. Thomsen	(Note: This literary short is included in the anthology Realms of the Underdark.)	
04/1996	Forgotten Realms	The Fires of Narbondel	Novella	Mark Anthony		
04/1996	Forgotten Realms	A Slow Day In Skullport	Novella	Ed Greenwood		
04/1996	Forgotten Realms	Rite of Blood	Novella	Elaine Cunningham		
04/1996	Forgotten Realms	Sea of Ghosts	Novella	Roger E. Moore		
04/1996	Forgotten Realms	Volo Does Menzo	Novelette	Brian Thomsen		
04/1996	Forgotten Realms	Postscript: Back at the Publishing House	Short Story	Brian Thomsen		
04/1996	Forgotten Realms	Passage to Dawn (An Excerpt)	Short Story	R. A. Salvatore		Legacy of the Drow (Note: This preview is included at the end of the anthology Realms of the Underdark.)
04/1996	Forgotten Realms	Daughter of the Drow (An Excerpt)	Short Story	Elaine Cunningham		Starlight and Shadows
04/1996	Forgotten Realms	Tangled Webs (An Excerpt)	Short Story	Elaine Cunningham		Starlight and Shadows
05/1996	Dragonlance	The Dragons at War	Anthology	Margaret Weis & Tracy Hickman editors	0-7869-0491-7	The Dragons Anthologies
05/1996	Dragonlance	Dream of the Namer	Short story	Michael Williams	(Note: This literary short is included in the anthology The Dragons at War.)	The Dragons Anthologies
05/1996	Dragonlance	People of the Dragon	Novelette	Mark Anthony		The Dragons Anthologies
05/1996	Dragonlance	Quarry	Short story	Adam Lesh		The Dragons Anthologies
05/1996	Dragonlance	Glory Descending	Novelette	Chris Pierson		The Dragons Anthologies
05/1996	Dragonlance	A Lull in the Battle	Novelette	Linda P. Baker		The Dragons Anthologies
05/1996	Dragonlance	Proper Tribute	Short story	Janet Pack		The Dragons Anthologies
05/1996	Dragonlance	Blind	Short story	Kevin T. Stein		The Dragons Anthologies
05/1996	Dragonlance	Nature of the Beast	Short story	Teri McLaren		The Dragons Anthologies
05/1996	Dragonlance	Even Dragon Blood	Short story	J. Robert King		The Dragons Anthologies
05/1996	Dragonlance	Boom	Short story	Jeff Grubb		The Dragons Anthologies
05/1996	Dragonlance	Storytellers	Novelette	Nick O'Donohoe		The Dragons Anthologies
05/1996	Dragonlance	The First Dragonarmy Engineer's Secret Weapon	Novelette	Don Perrin & Margaret Weis		The Dragons Anthologies
05/1996	Dragonlance	Through the Door at the Top of the Sky	Novelette	Roger E. Moore		The Dragons Anthologies
05/1996	Dragonlance	Aurora's Eggs	Novelette	Douglas Niles		The Dragons Anthologies
05/1996	Birthright	War	Novel	Simon Hawke	0-7869-0495-X	
05/1996	Forgotten Realms	Sword Play	Novel	Clayton Emery	0-7869-0492-5	Netheril Trilogy
06/1996	Planescape	Abyssal Warriors	Novel	J. Robert King	0-7869-0501-8	The Blood Wars Trilogy
06/1996	Dragonlance	The Gully Dwarves	Novel	Dan Parkinson	0-7869-0497-6	The Lost Histories (Note: The short stories Off Day from The Reign of Ihtar and Ogre Unaware from The Cataclysm both anthologies from the Dragonlance: Tales II series are a rough prelude to The Promised Place another short story from The War of the Lance, also from Dragonlance: Tales II, which then leads to this novel.)
06/1996	Birthright	The Hag's Contract	Novel	John Betancourt	0-7869-0496-8	
06/1996	Birthright	War (An Excerpt)	Short story	Simon Hawke	(Note: This preview is included at the end of the novel The Hag's Contract.)	
06/1996	Forgotten Realms	Silver Shadows	Novel	Elaine Cunningham	0-7869-0498-4	The Harpers & Songs & Swords
06/1996	Dragonlance (Note: This novel serves as a crossover between the two realms: Dragonlance and Forgotten Realms.)	Murder in Tarsis	Novel	John Maddox Roberts	0-7869-0500-X	Dragonlance: Classics
07/1996	Dragonlance	Knights of the Rose	Novel	Roland Green	0-7869-0502-6	Dragonlance: Warriors
07/1996	Forgotten Realms	Cormyr: A Novel	Novel	Ed Greenwood & Jeff Grubb	0-7869-0503-4	The Cormyr Saga
08/1996	Forgotten Realms	Passage to Dawn	Novel	R.A. Salvatore	0-7869-0489-5	Legacy of the Drow
08/1996	Mystara	The Black Vessel	Novel	Morris Simon	0-7869-0507-7	
08/1996	Forgotten Realms	The Mage in the Iron Mask	Novel	Brian Thomsen	0-7869-0506-9	Forgotten Realms: Nobles
09/1996	Ravenloft	To Sleep with Evil	Novel	Andria Cardarelle	0-7869-0515-8	
09/1996	Dragonlance	The Dawning of a New Age	Novel	Jean Rabe	0-7869-0616-2	Fifth Age: Dragons of a New Age (Note: Dhamon's story is continued in The Dhamon Saga series and The Lake of Death from the Age of Mortals series.)
09/1996	Birthright	The Spider's Test	Novel	Dixie Lee McKeone	0-7869-0512-3	
09/1996	Planescape	Pages of Pain	Novel	Troy Denning	0-7869-0508-5	
10/1996	Dragonlance	The Dragons	Novel	Douglas Niles	0-7869-0513-1	The Lost Histories (Note: The short story Aurora's Eggs from the anthology The Dragons at War is a prequel to The Dragons.)
10/1996	Forgotten Realms	Murder in Halruaa	Novel	Richard Meyers	0-7869-0521-2	Forgotten Realms: Mysteries
10/1996	Forgotten Realms	Stormlight	Novel	Ed Greenwood	0-7869-0520-4	The Harpers
11/1996	Greyhawk	Evening Odds	Short story	Gary Gygax	(Note: This short story is in the anthology Pawn of Chaos ISBN 1-56504-933-0 edited by Edward E. Kramer.)	Gord the Rogue
11/1996	Forgotten Realms	Dangerous Games	Novel	Clayton Emery	0-7869-0524-7	Netheril Trilogy
11/1996	Dragonlance	The Doom Brigade	Novel	Margaret Weis & Don Perrin	0-7869-0526-3	Chaos War (Note: In 2003 was re-released as volume one of the Kang's Regiment series.) (Note: The antagonists of Kang's Regiment are first introduced in the short stories The First Dragonarmy Bridging Company, in The Dragons of Krynn, and The First Dragonarmy Engineer's Secret Weapon, in The Dragons of War, both of which are part of The Dragon Anthologies. To bridge the gap between The Doom Brigade and Draconian Measures, the anthology Heroes and Fools contains a short story, To Convince the Righteous of the Right.)
12/1996	Dragonlance	Lord Soth	Novel	Edo Van Belkom	0-7869-0519-0	Dragonlance: Warriors
07/1997	Forgotten Realms	Finder's Bane	Novel	Kate Novak & Jeff Grubb	0-7869-0658-8	The Harpers & The Lost Gods (Note: This novel was re-released as the first novel in The Lost Gods series.)
07/1997	Planescape	Planar Powers	Novel	J. Robert King	0-7869-0532-8	The Blood Wars Trilogy
08/1997	Dragonlance	Vinas Solamnus	Novel	J. Robert King	0-7869-0787-8	Lost Legends
08/1997	Dragonlance	The Day of the Tempest	Novel	Jean Rabe	0-7869-0668-5	Fifth Age: Dragons of a New Age
09/1997	Dragonlance	The Wayward Knights	Novel	Roland Green	0-7869-0696-0	Dragonlance: Warriors
09/1997	Forgotten Realms	The Council of Blades	Novel	Paul Kidd	0-7869-0531-X	Forgotten Realms: Nobles
10/1997	Dragonlance	Fistandantilus Reborn	Novel	Douglas Niles	0-7869-0708-8	Lost Legends
10/1997	Ravenloft	Lord of the Necropolis	Novel	Gene DeWeese	0-7869-0660-X	
10/1997	Forgotten Realms	The Simbul's Gift	Novel	Lynn Abbey	0-7869-0763-0	Forgotten Realms: Nobles
11/1997	Dragonlance	Tales of Uncle Trapspringer	Novel	Dixie Lee McKeone	0-7869-0775-4	Lost Legends
11/1997	Forgotten Realms	Realms of the Arcane	Anthology	Brian Thomsen editor	0-7869-0647-2	Forgotten Realms
11/1997	Forgotten Realms	Prologue	Short Story	Wes Nicholson	(Note: This short story was released in Realms of the Arcane.)	
11/1997	Forgotten Realms	Wishing You Many More	Short Story	David Cook		
11/1997	Forgotten Realms	Secrets of Blood, Spirits of the Sea	Novelette	Elaine Cunningham		
11/1997	Forgotten Realms	Bread Storm Rising	Novelette	Tom Dupree		
11/1997	Forgotten Realms	Interlude	Short Story	Wes Nicholson		
11/1997	Forgotten Realms	When Even Sky Cities Fall	Short Story	J. Robert King		
11/1997	Forgotten Realms	The Grotto of Dreams	Novelette	Mark Anthony		
11/1997	Forgotten Realms	A Narrowed Gaze	Novelette	Monte Cook		
11/1997	Forgotten Realms	The Whispering Crown	Novelette	Ed Greenwood		
11/1997	Forgotten Realms	Interlude II	Short Story	Wes Nicholson		
11/1997	Forgotten Realms	The Lady and the Shadow	Novelette	Philip Athans		
11/1997	Forgotten Realms	Shadows of the Past	Novelette	Brian Thomsen		
11/1997	Forgotten Realms	Tertius and the Artifact	Novelette	Jeff Grubb		
11/1997	Forgotten Realms	Epilogue	Short Story	Wes Nicholson		
11/1997	Forgotten Realms	Elminster in Myth Drannor	Novel	Ed Greenwood	0-7869-0661-8	The Elminster Series & Sage of Shadowdale
12/1997	Forgotten Realms	Tymora's Luck	Novel	Kate Novak & Jeff Grubb	0-7869-0726-6	The Lost Gods
12/1997	Dragonlance	The Dragons of Chaos	Anthology	Margaret Weis & Tracy Hickman editors	0-7869-0681-2	The Dragons Anthologies
12/1997	Dragonlance	Eye of Chaos	Short story	Sue Weinlein Cook	(Note: This literary short is included in the anthology The Dragons of Chaos.)	The Dragons Anthologies
12/1997	Dragonlance	The Noble Folly	Short story	Mark Anthony		The Dragons Anthologies
12/1997	Dragonlance	Lessons of the Land	Novelette	Linda P. Baker		The Dragons Anthologies
12/1997	Dragonlance	The Son of Huma	Novelette	Richard A. Knaak		The Dragons Anthologies
12/1997	Dragonlance	Personal	Short story	Kevin T. Stein		The Dragons Anthologies
12/1997	Dragonlance	The Dragon's Eye	Short story	Adam Lesh		The Dragons Anthologies
12/1997	Dragonlance	Dragonfear	Short story	Teri McLaren		The Dragons Anthologies
12/1997	Dragonlance	Tavern Tales	Short story	Jean Rabe		The Dragons Anthologies
12/1997	Dragonlance	The Dragon's Well	Short story	Janet Pack		The Dragons Anthologies
12/1997	Dragonlance	The Magnificent Two	Novelette	Nick O'Donohoe		The Dragons Anthologies
12/1997	Dragonlance	There is Another Shore, You Know, Upon the Other Side	Novelette	Roger E. Moore		The Dragons Anthologies
12/1997	Dragonlance	The First Gully Dwarf Resistance	Novelette	Chris Pierson		The Dragons Anthologies
12/1997	Dragonlance	The Star Shard	Short story	Jeff Grubb		The Dragons Anthologies
12/1997	Dragonlance	Master Tall and Master Small	Short story	Margaret Weis & Don Perrin		The Dragons Anthologies
12/1997	Dragonlance	Icewall	Novelette	Douglas Niles		The Dragons Anthologies
1998	Forgotten Realms	Rise of the Blade	Online Novel	Charles Alexander Moffatt		The Harpers (Note: This novel was never released as || The Harpers series was cancelled. The Author released the book on his website.)
01/1998	Dragonlance	The Soulforge	Novel	Margaret Weis	0-7869-0645-6	The Raistlin Chronicles
01/1998	Forgotten Realms	Mortal Consequences	Novel	Clayton Emery	0-7869-0683-9	Netheril Trilogy
01/1998	Forgotten Realms	The Abduction	Novel	J. Robert King	0-7869-0864-5	Double Diamond Triangle Saga
01/1998	Forgotten Realms	The Mercenaries	Novel	Ed Greenwood	0-7869-0866-1	Double Diamond Triangle Saga
01/1998	Forgotten Realms	The Paladins	Novel	James M. Ward & David Wise	0-7869-0865-3	Double Diamond Triangle Saga
02/1998	Dragonlance	The Eve of the Maelstrom	Novel	Jean Rabe	0-7869-0749-5	Fifth Age: Dragons of a New Age
02/1998	Forgotten Realms	Crucible: The Trial of Cyric the Mad	Novel	Troy Denning	0-7869-0724-X	The Avatar Series
02/1998	Forgotten Realms	Errand of Mercy	Novel	Roger E. Moore	0-7869-0867-X	Double Diamond Triangle Saga
03/1998	Forgotten Realms	An Opportunity for Profit	Novel	Dave Gross	0-7869-0868-8	Double Diamond Triangle Saga
03/1998	Ravenloft	Shadowborn	Novel	William W. Connors & Carrie Bebris	0-7869-0766-5	
03/1998	Forgotten Realms	The Lost Library of Cormanthyr	Novel	Mel Odom	0-7869-0735-5	Lost Empires
04/1998	Dragonlance	Relics and Omens	Anthology	Margaret Weis & Tracy Hickman (editors)	0-7869-1169-7	Tales of the Fifth Age
04/1998	Dragonlance	Icefall	Short story	Douglas Niles	(Note: This literary short is included in the anthology Relics and Omens, which is part of the Tales of the Fifth Age series.)	Tales of the Fifth Age
04/1998	Dragonlance	Legacy	Novelette	Nancy Varian Berberick		Tales of the Fifth Age
04/1998	Dragonlance	Sword of Tears	Novelette	Richard A. Knaak		Tales of the Fifth Age
04/1998	Dragonlance	The Cost	Short story	Janet Pack		Tales of the Fifth Age
04/1998	Dragonlance	A Most Peculiar Artifact	Novelette	Robyn McGrew		Tales of the Fifth Age
04/1998	Dragonlance	Voices	Novelette	Kevin T. Stein		Tales of the Fifth Age
04/1998	Dragonlance	The Notorious Booke of Starres	Novelette	Nick O'Donohoe		Tales of the Fifth Age
04/1998	Dragonlance	Scavengers	Short story	Jean Rabe		Tales of the Fifth Age
04/1998	Dragonlance	Homecoming	Short story	William W. Connors & Sue Weinlein Cook		Tales of the Fifth Age
04/1998	Dragonlance	The Restoration	Short story	Jeff Crook		Tales of the Fifth Age
04/1998	Dragonlance	Relics	Short story	Jeff Grubb		Tales of the Fifth Age
04/1998	Dragonlance	The Summoners	Novelette	Paul B. Thompson		Tales of the Fifth Age
04/1998	Dragonlance	Island of Night	Novella	Roger E. Moore		Tales of the Fifth Age
04/1998	Dragonlance	Demons of the Mind	Novelette	Margaret Weis & Don Perrin		Tales of the Fifth Age
04/1998	Forgotten Realms	Conspiracy	Novel	J. Robert King	0-7869-0869-6	Double Diamond Triangle Saga
04/1998	Forgotten Realms	Evermeet: Island of Elves	Novel	Elaine Cunningham	0-7869-0713-4	
05/1998	Forgotten Realms	Uneasy Alliances	Novel	David Cook & Peter Archer	0-7869-0870-X	Double Diamond Triangle Saga
06/1998	Forgotten Realms	Easy Betrayals	Novel	Richard Baker	0-7869-0871-8	Double Diamond Triangle Saga
06/1998	Ravenloft	I, Strahd: The War Against Azalin	Novel	P.N. Elrod	0-7869-0754-1	I, Strahd
06/1998	Dragonlance	The Last Thane	Novel	Douglas Niles	0-7869-1172-7	Chaos War
06/1998	Forgotten Realms	Realms of Mystery	Anthology	Philip Athans editor	0-7869-1171-9	Forgotten Realms
06/1998	Forgotten Realms	Speaking With the Dead	Novelette	Elaine Cunningham	(Note: This literary short is included in the anthology Realms of Mystery.)	
06/1998	Forgotten Realms	A Walk In the Snow	Novelette	Dave Gross		
06/1998	Forgotten Realms	The Rose Window	Short Story	Monte Cook		
06/1998	Forgotten Realms	The Club Rules	Novelette	James Lowder		
06/1998	Forgotten Realms	Thieves' Justice	Novelette	Mary H. Herbert		
06/1998	Forgotten Realms	Ekhar Lorrent: Gnome Detective	Short Story	Steven 'Stan' Brown		
06/1998	Forgotten Realms	The Devil and Tertius Wands	Novelette	Jeff Grubb		
06/1998	Forgotten Realms	H	Novelette	Richard Lee Byers		
06/1998	Forgotten Realms	Strange Bedfellows	Novelette	Keith Francis Strohm		
06/1998	Forgotten Realms	Whence the Song of Steel	Short Story	J. Robert King		
06/1998	Forgotten Realms	An Unusual Suspect	Short Story	Brian M. Thomsen		
06/1998	Forgotten Realms	Darkly, Through a Glass of Ale	Novelette	Peter Archer		
06/1998	Forgotten Realms	Lynaelle	Novelette	Thomas M. Reid		
06/1998	Forgotten Realms	The Grinning Ghost of Taverton Hall	Novelette	Ed Greenwood		
07/1998	Forgotten Realms	The Diamond	Novel	J. Robert King & Ed Greenwood	0-7869-0872-6	Double Diamond Triangle Saga
07/1998	Forgotten Realms	The Dark Elf Trilogy (Note: This is a compilation of all the books of the series.)	Novel	R.A. Salvatore	0-7869-1176-X	The Dark Elf Trilogy
07/1998	Dragonlance	Spirit of the Wind	Novel	Chris Pierson	0-7869-1174-3	Bridges of Time
08/1998	Forgotten Realms	Thornhold	Novel	Elaine Cunningham	0-7869-1177-8	The Harpers & Songs & Swords
09/1998	Forgotten Realms	The Shadow Stone	Novel	Richard Baker	0-7869-1186-7	The Adventures
10/1998	Dragonlance	Tears of the Night Sky	Novel	Linda P. Baker & Nancy Varian Berberick	0-7869-1185-9	Chaos War
10/1998	Forgotten Realms	The Silent Blade	Novel	R.A. Salvatore	0-7869-1180-8	Paths of Darkness
11/1998	Dragonlance	Legacy of Steel	Novel	Mary H. Herbert	0-7869-1187-5	Bridges of Time
11/1998	Forgotten Realms	Faces of Deception	Novel	Troy Denning	0-7869-1183-2	Lost Empires
12/1998	Forgotten Realms	The Temptation of Elminster	Novel	Ed Greenwood	0-7869-1189-1	The Elminster Series & Sage of Shadowdale
01/1999	Forgotten Realms	The Cleric Quintet: Collector's Edition	Novel	R.A. Salvatore	0-7869-1313-4	The Cleric Quintet
01/1999	Dragonlance	The Silver Stair	Novel	Jean Rabe	0-7869-1315-0	Bridges of Time
01/1999	Forgotten Realms	Rising Tide	Novel	Mel Odom	0-7869-1312-6	The Threat from the Sea
02/1999	Dragonlance	The Puppet King	Novel	Douglas Niles	0-7869-1324-X	Chaos War
02/1999	Forgotten Realms	Star of Cursrah	Novel	Clayton Emery	0-7869-1322-3	Lost Empires
03/1999	Dragonlance	The Rose and the Skull	Novel	Jeff Crook	0-7869-1336-3	Bridges of Time
03/1999	Ravenloft	Spectre of the Black Rose	Novel	James Lowder & Voronica Whitney-Robinson	0-7869-1333-9	
04/1999	Forgotten Realms	The Glass Prison	Novel	Monte Cook	0-7869-1343-6	
05/1999	Dragonlance	Reavers of the Blood Sea	Novel	Richard A. Knaak	0-7869-1345-2	Chaos War
05/1999	Forgotten Realms	The Dream Spheres	Novel	Elaine Cunningham	0-7869-1342-8	Songs & Swords
06/1999	Dragonlance	Dezra's Quest	Novel	Chris Pierson	0-7869-1368-1	Bridges of Time
07/1999	Greyhawk	Against the Giants	Novel	Ru Emerson	0-7869-1379-7	Greyhawk: Classic Series
07/1999	Forgotten Realms	Baldur's Gate	Novel	Philip Athans	0-7869-1525-0	Baldur's Gate Series
07/1999	Dragonlance	Heroes and Fools	Anthology	Margaret Weis & Tracy Hickman editors	0-7869-1346-0	Tales of the Fifth Age
07/1999	Dragonlance	Boojum, Boojum	Short story	Janet Pack	(Note: This literary short is included in the anthology Heroes and Fools.)	Tales of the Fifth Age
07/1999	Dragonlance	Tree of Life	Short story	Miranda Horner		Tales of the Fifth Age
07/1999	Dragonlance	Songsayer	Novelette	Todd Fahnestock & Giles Custer		Tales of the Fifth Age
07/1999	Dragonlance	Gnomebody	Novelette	Jeff Grubb		Tales of the Fifth Age
07/1999	Dragonlance	The Road Home	Novelette	Nancy Varian Berberick		Tales of the Fifth Age
07/1999	Dragonlance	Nobless Oblige	Novelette	Paul B. Thompson		Tales of the Fifth Age
07/1999	Dragonlance	Much Ado About Magic	Novelette	Kevin James Kage		Tales of the Fifth Age
07/1999	Dragonlance	A Pinch of This, A Dash of That	Novelette	Nick O'Donohoe		Tales of the Fifth Age
07/1999	Dragonlance	A Perfect Plan	Novelette	Linda P. Baker		Tales of the Fifth Age
07/1999	Dragonlance	The Thief in the Mirror	Novelette	Richard A. Knaak		Tales of the Fifth Age
07/1999	Dragonlance	Reorx Steps Out	Novelette	Jean Rabe		Tales of the Fifth Age
07/1999	Dragonlance	The Bridge	Short story	Douglas Niles		Tales of the Fifth Age
07/1999	Dragonlance	Gone	Novelette	Roger E. Moore		Tales of the Fifth Age
07/1999	Dragonlance	To Convince the Righteous of the Right	Novelette	Don Perrin & Margaret Weis		Tales of the Fifth Age
08/1999	Dragonlance	The Odyssey of Gilthanas: Dragonlance Reader's Companion	Novel	Douglas Niles, Steve Miller, & Stan!	0-7869-1446-7	Dragonlance: Sourcebooks on Krynn
08/1999	Dragonlance	Brothers in Arms	Novel	Margaret Weis & Don Perrin	0-7869-1429-7	The Raistlin Chronicles
08/1999	Forgotten Realms	Silverfall: Stories of the Seven Sisters	Anthology	Ed Greenwood	0-7869-1365-7	
08/1999	Forgotten Realms	Dove: No More in Armor for My Sake	Novella	Ed Greenwood	(Note: This novella is included in the anthology Silverfall: Stories of the Seven Sisters.)	
08/1999	Forgotten Realms	Qilué: Dark Dancer, Bright Dance	Novella	Ed Greenwood		
08/1999	Forgotten Realms	Laeral: Lady Passalanter's Busy Day	Novella	Ed Greenwood		
08/1999	Forgotten Realms	Alustriel: When a Good Man Loses His Head	Novella	Ed Greenwood		
08/1999	Forgotten Realms	Syluné: The Haunting of Blandras Huin	Novella	Ed Greenwood		
08/1999	Forgotten Realms	The Simbul: Wizard Hunting Season	Novella	Ed Greenwood		
08/1999	Forgotten Realms	Storm: Not Just Any Mage in a Storm	Novella	Ed Greenwood		
09/1999	Dragonlance	The Siege of Mt. Nevermind	Novel	Fergus Ryan	0-7869-1381-9	Chaos War
09/1999	Forgotten Realms	The Spine of the World	Novel	R.A. Salvatore	0-7869-1418-1	Paths of Darkness
10/1999	Forgotten Realms	Under Fallen Stars	Novel	Mel Odom	0-7869-1378-9	The Threat from the Sea
10/1999	Greyhawk	White Plume Mountain	Novel	Paul Kidd	0-7869-1424-6	
11/1999	Planescape	Torment	Novel	Ray Vallese & Valerie Vallese	0-7869-1527-7	
11/1999	Dragonlance	The Annotated Chronicles	Annotated Novel	Margaret Weis & Tracy Hickman	0-7869-1526-9	The Chronicles Trilogy (Note: This compilation is all three of the original trilogy with notes from the authors.)
12/1999	Forgotten Realms	Beyond the High Road	Novel	Troy Denning	0-7869-1436-X	The Cormyr Saga

== 2000s ==
2000s
Date	Setting	Title	Type	Author(s)	ISBN	Series
2000	Mystara	Dungeons & Dragons: The Movie (novel adaptation)	novel	Steve Atley		
01/2000	Dragonlance	Dalamar the Dark	Novel	Nancy Varian Berberick	0-7869-1565-X	Dragonlance: Classics
01/2000	Forgotten Realms	The Icewind Dale Trilogy: Collector's Edition	Novel	R.A. Salvatore	0-7869-1557-9	The Icewind Dale Trilogy
02/2000	Dragonlance	The Best of Tales	Anthology	Margaret Weis & Tracy Hickman (Note: This anthology contains shorts from the first three Tales anthologies, Love and War, The Magic of Krynn & Kender, Gully Dwarves, and Gnomes and one new short story by Margaret Weis & Aron Eisenberg.)	0-7869-1567-6	
02/2000	Dragonlance	Riverwind and the Crystal Staff	Poem	Michael Williams	(Note: This literary short is reprinted here in The Best of Tales, and was originally included in the anthology The Magic of Krynn.)	
02/2000	Dragonlance	A Stone's Throw Away	Short story	Roger E. Moore		
02/2000	Dragonlance	Love and Ale	Novelette	Nick O'Donohoe		
02/2000	Dragonlance	Dagger-Flight	Novelette	Nick O'Donohoe	(Note: This literary short is reprinted here in The Best of Tales, and was originally included in the anthology Kender, Gully Dwarves, and Gnomes.)	
02/2000	Dragonlance	Harvests	Novelette	Nancy Varian Berberick		
02/2000	Dragonlance	Hide and Go Seek	Novelette	Nancy Varian Berberick	(Note: This literary short is reprinted here in The Best of Tales, and was originally included in the anthology Love and War.)	
02/2000	Dragonlance	Finding the Faith	Novelette	Mary Kirchoff		
02/2000	Dragonlance	Into the Heart of the Story	Novelette	Michael Williams		
02/2000	Dragonlance	The Exiles	Novelette	Paul B. Thompson & Tonya R. Carter		
02/2000	Dragonlance	Heart of Goldmoon	Novella	Laura Hickman & Kate Novak		
02/2000	Dragonlance	Wayward Children	Novelette	Richard A. Knaak		
02/2000	Dragonlance	Definitions of Honor	Novelette	Richard A. Knaak		
02/2000	Dragonlance	The Test of the Twins	Short story	Margaret Weis		
02/2000	Dragonlance	From the Yearning for War and the War's Ending	Novelette	Michael Williams		
02/2000	Dragonlance	The Travelling Players of Gilean	Short story	Margaret Weis & Aron Eisenberg	(Note: This is the only original piece included in the anthology The Best of Tales.)	
03/2000	Forgotten Realms	Realms of the Deep	Anthology	Philip Athans editor	0-7869-1568-4	The Threat From the Sea
03/2000	Forgotten Realms	Hard Choices	Novelette	Lynn Abbey	(Note: This literary short is included in the anthology Realms of the Deep, which is part of the series The Threat from the Sea.)	The Threat From the Sea
03/2000	Forgotten Realms	Fire is Fire	Novelette	Elaine Cunningham		The Threat From the Sea
03/2000	Forgotten Realms	Messenger to Serôs	Novelette	Peter Archer		The Threat From the Sea
03/2000	Forgotten Realms	The Place Where Guards Snore at Their Posts	Novelette	Ed Greenwood		The Threat From the Sea
03/2000	Forgotten Realms	Lost Cause	Novelette	Richard Lee Byers		The Threat From the Sea
03/2000	Forgotten Realms	Forged in Fire	Novelette	Clayton Emery		The Threat From the Sea
03/2000	Forgotten Realms	One Who Swims with Sekolah	Novelette	Mel Odom		The Threat From the Sea
03/2000	Forgotten Realms	The Crystal Reef	Novelette	Troy Denning		The Threat From the Sea
03/2000	Forgotten Realms	The Patrol	Novelette	Larry Hobbs		The Threat From the Sea
03/2000	Forgotten Realms	Star of Tethyr	Novelette	Thomas M. Reid		The Threat From the Sea
03/2000	Forgotten Realms	Persana's Blade	Novelette	Steven E. Schend		The Threat From the Sea
03/2000	Forgotten Realms	And the Dark Tide Rises	Novelette	Keith Francis Strohm		The Threat From the Sea
03/2000	Forgotten Realms	The Calendar of Harptos	Essay	Philip Athans		The Threat From the Sea
03/2000	Dragonlance	Dragons of a Fallen Sun	Novel	Margaret Weis & Tracy Hickman	0-7869-1564-1	The War of Souls (Note: Dragons of a Summer Flame is a prequel to this series.)
04/2000	Forgotten Realms	The Magehound	Novel	Elaine Cunningham	0-7869-1561-7	Counselors & Kings
04/2000	Dragonlance	Rebels and Tyrants (Note: The short story Lost Causes from the Rebels and Tyrants anthology serves as a prequel to Prisoner of Haven.)	Anthology	Margaret Weis & Tracy Hickman editors	0-7869-1676-1	Tales of the Fifth Age
04/2000	Dragonlance	Est Sularis Oth Mithas	Short story	Scott M. Buraczewski	(Note: This literary short is included in the anthology Rebels and Tyrants.)	Tales of the Fifth Age
04/2000	Dragonlance	Freedom's Pride	Novelette	Paul B. Thompson		Tales of the Fifth Age
04/2000	Dragonlance	Sargas's Night of Revenge	Short story	Don Perrin		Tales of the Fifth Age
04/2000	Dragonlance	Sharing the Luck	Novelette	Linda P. Baker		Tales of the Fifth Age
04/2000	Dragonlance	War Chest	Novelette	Kevin T. Stein		Tales of the Fifth Age
04/2000	Dragonlance	Flight of Fancy	Short story	Jeff Crook		Tales of the Fifth Age
04/2000	Dragonlance	The Deep, Deep, Dark, Dark Place	Short story	Kevin Kage		Tales of the Fifth Age
04/2000	Dragonlance	Catch of the Day	Short story	Jean Rabe		Tales of the Fifth Age
04/2000	Dragonlance	Lost Causes	Novelette	Nancy Varian Berberick		Tales of the Fifth Age
04/2000	Dragonlance	Blood Ties	Novelette	John Grubber		Tales of the Fifth Age
04/2000	Dragonlance	Shard's Memory	Novelette	Chris Pierson		Tales of the Fifth Age
04/2000	Dragonlance	Tactics	Novelette	Richard A. Knaak		Tales of the Fifth Age
04/2000	Dragonlance	The Raid on the Academy of Sorcery	Novelette	Margaret Weis		Tales of the Fifth Age
05/2000	Birthright	The Falcon and the Wolf	Online novel	Richard Baker	0-7869-0529-8	
05/2000	Forgotten Realms	The Sea Devil's Eye	Novel	Mel Odom	0-7869-1638-9	The Threat from the Sea
05/2000	Dragonlance	Downfall	Novel	Jean Rabe	0-7869-1572-2	The Dhamon Saga (Note: This saga picks up from the Dragons of a New Age series and is continued in The Lake of Death.)
06/2000	Dragonlance	More Leaves from the Inn of the Last Home	Collection	Margaret Weis & Tracy Hickman editors	0-7869-1516-1	Dragonlance: Sourcebooks on Krynn
06/2000	Greyhawk	Descent into the Depths of the Earth	Novel	Paul Kidd	0-7869-1635-4	Greyhawk: Classic Series
07/2000	Forgotten Realms	The Halls of Stormweather	Anthology	Philip Athans editor	0-7869-1560-9	Sembia
07/2000	Forgotten Realms	The Patriarch: The Burning Chalice	Novella	Ed Greenwood	(Note: This literary story is included in the anthology The Halls of Stormweather.)	Sembia
07/2000	Forgotten Realms	The Matriarch: Song of Chaos	Novella	Richard Lee Byers		Sembia
07/2000	Forgotten Realms	The Heir: Night School	Novella	Clayton Emery		Sembia
07/2000	Forgotten Realms	The Daughter: The Price	Novella	Voronica Whitney-Robinson		Sembia
07/2000	Forgotten Realms	The Second Son: Thirty Days	Novella	Dave Gross		Sembia
07/2000	Forgotten Realms	The Butler: Resurrection	Novella	Paul S. Kemp		Sembia
07/2000	Forgotten Realms	The Maid: Skin Deep	Novelette	Lisa Smedman		Sembia
07/2000	Dragonlance	The Clandestine Circle (Note: Linsha Majere's story starts in The Clandestine Circle, is continued in The Linsha Trilogy and finishes in the short story The Eight from the collection Dragons of Time.)	Novel	Mary H. Herbert	0-7869-1610-9	Dragonlance: Crossroads
08/2000	Forgotten Realms	Death of the Dragon	Novel	Ed Greenwood & Troy Denning	0-7869-1637-0	The Cormyr Saga
08/2000	Dragonlance	The Citadel	Novel	Richard A. Knaak	0-7869-1683-4	Dragonlance: Classics
09/2000	Dragonlance	Children of the Plains	Novel	Paul B. Thompson & Tonya C. Cook	0-7869-1391-6	Barbarians
09/2000	Forgotten Realms	Baldur's Gate 2: Shadows of Amn	Novel	Philip Athans	0-7869-1569-2	Baldur's Gate
09/2000	Forgotten Realms	The Nether Scroll	Novel	Lynn Abbey	0-7869-1566-8	Lost Empires
10/2000	Dragonlance	Bertrem's Guide to the Age of Mortals: Everyday Life in Krynn of the Fifth Age	Novel	Nancy Varian Berberick, Steven Stan! Brown, & Paul B. Thompson	0-7869-1437-8	Bertrem's Guide
10/2000	Forgotten Realms	Servant of the Shard	Novel	R.A. Salvatore	0-7869-1657-5	Paths of Darkness & The Sellswords (Note: This novel was released as part of both Paths of Darkness and The Sellswords.)
11/2000	Greyhawk	Expedition to the Barrier Peaks	Novel	Paul Kidd	0-7869-1656-7	
11/2000	Forgotten Realms	Shadow's Witness	Novel	Paul S. Kemp	07869-1677-X	Sembia
11/2000	Dragonlance	Draconian Measures	Novel	Don Perrin & Margaret Weis	0-7869-1678-8	Kang's Regiment
12/2000	Forgotten Realms	The City of Ravens	Novel	Richard Baker	0-7869-1401-7	The Cities
12/2000	Dragonlance	The Thieves' Guild	Novel	Jeff Crook	0-7869-1681-8	Dragonlance: Crossroads
01/2001	Forgotten Realms	Legacy of the Drow: Collector's Edition	Novel	R.A. Salvatore	0-7869-1800-4	Legacy of the Drow
02/2001	Dragonlance	The Messenger	Novel	Douglas Niles	0-7869-1571-4	Icewall Trilogy
03/2001	Forgotten Realms	The Summoning	Novel	Troy Denning	0-7869-1801-2	Return of the Archwizards
04/2001	Forgotten Realms	The Floodgate	Novel	Elaine Cunningham	0-7869-1818-7	Counselors & Kings
04/2001	Dragonlance	Dragons of a Lost Star	Novel	Margaret Weis & Tracy Hickman	0-7869-1817-9	The War of Souls
05/2001	Greyhawk	The Temple of Elemental Evil	Novel	Thomas M. Reid	ISBN 0-7869-1864-0	
05/2001	Dragonlance	The Inheritance	Novel	Nancy Varian Berberick	ISBN 0-7869-1861-6	Classics
06/2001	Forgotten Realms	The Shattered Mask	Novel	Richard Lee Byers	ISBN 978-07869-1862-1	Sembia: Gateway to the Realms
07/2001	Dragonlance	Dragon's Bluff	Novel	Mary H. Herbert	ISBN 0-7869-1877-2	Crossroads
08/2001	Forgotten Realms	Pool of Radiance: Ruins of Myth Drannor	Novel	Carrie A. Bebris	ISBN 9780786913879	
08/2001	Forgotten Realms	Elminster in Hell	Novel	Ed Greenwood	ISBN 978-0-7869-1875-1	The Elminster Series
08/2001	Dragonlance	Brother of the Dragon	Novel	Tonya C. Cook & Paul B. Thompson	ISBN 978-0-7869-1873-7	Barbarians
09/2001	Dragonlance	Bertrem's Guide to the War of Souls, Volume One	Novel	Mary H. Herbert, Nancy Varian Berberick, & John Grubber	ISBN 0-7869-1882-9	Bertrem's Guide
09/2001	Forgotten Realms	Baldur's Gate II: The Throne of Bhaal	Novel	Drew Karpyshyn	ISBN 978-0-7869-1985-7	The Baldur's Gate Series
09/2001	Forgotten Realms	Temple Hill	Novel	Drew Karpyshyn	ISBN 978-0-7869-1871-3	The Cities
09/2001	Forgotten Realms	The Dark Elf Trilogy: Gift Set (Note: This is a set of all the books of the series in a boxed set.)	Novel	R.A. Salvatore	ISBN 978-0-7869-1176-9	The Dark Elf Trilogy
10/2001	Forgotten Realms	Sea of Swords	Novel	R.A. Salvatore	ISBN 978-0-7869-1898-0	Paths of Darkness
10/2001	Dragonlance	The Search for Magic: Tales from the War of Souls	Anthology	Margaret Weis & Tracy Hickman editors (Note: Authors of these short stories include Brian Murphy (writer), Nancy Varian Berberick, Linda P. Baker, Nick O'Donohoe, Paul B. Thompson, Jeff Crook, Kevin T. Stein, Jean Rabe, Richard A. Knaak, Don Perrin, & Donald Bingle.)	ISBN 0-7869-1899-3	Tales/Dragons from the War of Souls/World of Krynn
10/2001	Greyhawk	Queen of the Demonweb Pits	Novel	Paul Kidd	ISBN 0-7869-1903-5	
11/2001	Forgotten Realms	Black Wolf	Novel	Dave Gross	ISBN 978-07869-1901-7	Sembia: Gateway to the Realms
11/2001	Dragonlance	Chosen of the Gods	Novel	Chris Pierson	ISBN 0-7869-1902-7	Kingpriest
11/2001	Greyhawk	Keep on the Borderlands	Novel	Ru Emerson	ISBN 0-7869-1903-5	
12/2001	Forgotten Realms	The Siege	Novel	Troy Denning	ISBN 978-0-7869-1905-5	Return of the Archwizards
12/2001	Dragonlance	Conundrum (Dragonlance novel)	Novel	Jeff Crook	ISBN 0-7869-1949-3	Age of Mortals
01/2002	Dragonlance	Dragons of a Vanished Moon	Novel	Margaret Weis & Tracy Hickman	ISBN 0-7869-2950-2	The War of Souls
01/2002	Dragonlance	The Best of Tales, Volume Two	Anthology	Margaret Weis & Tracy Hickman (editors) (Note: Contains selection from the Tales II Anthologies and one new RPG adventure by Tracy Hickman.)	ISBN 0-7869-2700-3	Best of Anthologies
02/2002	Dragonlance	The Golden Orb	Novel	Douglas Niles	ISBN 0-7869-2692-9	Icewall
02/2002	Greyhawk	The Tomb of Horrors	Novel	Keith Francis Strohm	ISBN 0-7869-2702-X	
02/2002	Forgotten Realms	The Jewel of Turmish	Novel	Mel Odom	ISBN 978-0-7869-2698-5	The Cities
03/2002	Forgotten Realms	The Wizardwar	Novel	Elaine Cunningham	ISBN 9780786927043	Counselors & Kings
04/2002	Dragonlance	Betrayal	Novel	Jean Rabe	ISBN 0-7869-2718-6	Dhamon Saga
04/2002	Forgotten Realms	Realms of Shadow	Anthology	Lizz Baldwin (editor)	ISBN 978-0-7869-2716-6	Return of the Archwizards
04/2002	Forgotten Realms	Trial by Ordeal	Short Story	Lisa Smedman	(Note: This story is included in the anthology Realm of Shadows.)	Return of the Archwizards
04/2002	Forgotten Realms	Assassin's Shadow	Short Story	Jess Lebow		Return of the Archwizards
04/2002	Forgotten Realms	Too Long in the Dark	Short Story	Paul S. Kemp		Return of the Archwizards
04/2002	Forgotten Realms	Darksword	Short Story	Troy Denning		Return of the Archwizards
04/2002	Forgotten Realms	Liar's Game	Short Story	Jessica Beaven		Return of the Archwizards
04/2002	Forgotten Realms	That Curious Sword	Short Story	R.A. Salvatore		Return of the Archwizards
04/2002	Forgotten Realms	A Little Knowledge	Short Story	Elaine Cunningham		Return of the Archwizards
04/2002	Forgotten Realms	Astride the Wind	Short Story	Philip Athans		Return of the Archwizards
04/2002	Forgotten Realms	The Fallen Lands	Short Story	Murray J. D. Leeder		Return of the Archwizards
04/2002	Forgotten Realms	When Shadows Come Seeking a Throne	Short Story	Ed Greenwood		Return of the Archwizards
04/2002	Forgotten Realms	King Shadow	Short Story	Richard Lee Byers		Return of the Archwizards
04/2002	Forgotten Realms	The Shifting Sands	Short Story	Peter Archer		Return of the Archwizards
05/2002	Dragonlance	Sister of the Sword	Novel	Tonya C. Cook & Paul B. Thompson	ISBN 0-7869-2789-5	Barbarians
06/2002	Forgotten Realms	Heirs of Prophecy	Novel	Lisa Smedman	ISBN 978-07869-2737-1	Sembia: Gateway to the Realms
06/2002	D&D	Savage Caves	Novel	T. H. Lain	ISBN 978-07869-2845-3	Iconics
07/2002	Forgotten Realms	Dissolution	Novel	Richard Lee Byers	ISBN 978-0-7869-2714-2	War of the Spider Queen
08/2002	Dragonlance	The Lioness (novel) (Note: The Lioness appears in the short story Freedom's Pride in the Rebels and Tyrants anthology.)	Novel	Nancy Varian Berberick	ISBN 0-7869-2752-6	Age of Mortals
08/2002	D&D	The Living Dead	Novel	T. H. Lain	ISBN 978-07869-2848-4	Iconics
09/2002	Forgotten Realms	The Icewind Dale Trilogy: Gift Set	Novel	R.A. Salvatore	ISBN 978-0-7869-2720-3	The Icewind Dale Trilogy
09/2002	Forgotten Realms	Hand of Fire	Novel	Ed Greenwood	ISBN 978-0-7869-2760-9	Shandrill's Saga
09/2002	D&D	Oath of Nerull	Novel	T. H. Lain	ISBN 978-07869-2851-4	Iconics
10/2002	Dragonlance	Divine Hammer	Novel	Chris Pierson	ISBN 0-7869-2807-7	Kingpriest
10/2002	Forgotten Realms	The Thousand Orcs	Novel	R.A. Salvatore	ISBN 978-0-7869-2804-0	The Hunter's Blade Trilogy
11/2002	Forgotten Realms	The Sorcerer	Novel	Troy Denning	ISBN 978-0-7869-2795-1	Return of the Archwizards
11/2002	Dragonlance	Bertrem's Guide to the War of Souls, Volume Two	Novel	Mary H. Herbert, Don Perrin, & Stan Brown	ISBN 0-7869-2816-6	Bertrem's Guide
11/2002	Forgotten Realms	Sands of the Soul	Novel	Voronica Whitney-Robinson	ISBN 978-07869-2813-2	Sembia: Gateway to the Realms
11/2002	Forgotten Realms	Lord of Stormweather	Novel	Dave Gross	ISBN 978-07869-2932-0	Sembia: Gateway to the Realms
11/2002	D&D	City of Fire	Novel	T. H. Lain	ISBN 978-07869-2854-5	Iconics
12/2002	Forgotten Realms	Insurrection	Novel	Thomas M. Reid	ISBN 978-0-7869-2786-9	War of the Spider Queen
12/2002	Dragonlance	The Dragon Isles	Novel	Stephen D. Sullivan	ISBN 0-7869-2827-1	Crossroads
01/2003	Dragonlance	Winterheim	Novel	Douglas Niles	ISBN 0-7869-2911-1	Icewall
01/2003	D&D	The Bloody Eye	Novel	T. H. Lain	ISBN 978-07869-2917-7	Iconics
02/2003	Dragonlance	The Players of Gilean: Tales from the World of Krynn	Anthology	Margaret Weis & Tracy Hickman editors (Note: Authors of these short stories include Douglas Niles, Fergus Ryan, Paul B. Thompson, Donald J. Bingle, Richard A. Knaak, Aron Eisenberg, & Jean Rabe.)	ISBN 0-7869-2920-0	Tales/Dragons from the War of Souls/World of Krynn
03/2003	D&D	Treachery's Wake	Novel	T. H. Lain	ISBN 978-07869-2926-9	Iconics
04/2003	Forgotten Realms	Windwalker	Novel	Elaine Cunningham	ISBN 978-0-7869-2968-9	Starlight & Shadows
05/2003	Dragonlance	A Warrior's Journey	Novel	Paul B. Thompson & Tonya C. Cook	ISBN 0-7869-2965-0	Ergoth
05/2003	Forgotten Realms	Condemnation	Novel	Richard Baker	ISBN 978-0-7869-2824-8	War of the Spider Queen
05/2003	D&D	Plague of Ice	Novel	T. H. Lain	ISBN 978-07869-2953-5	Iconics
06/2003	Dragonlance	A Rumor of Dragons	Novel	Margaret Weis & Tracy Hickman	ISBN 0-7869-3087-X	Young Adult Chronicles (Note: This is a reprint of the first half of Dragons of Autumn Twilight re-written for a young adult audience.)
06/2003	Dragonlance	Night of Blood	Novel	Richard A. Knaak	ISBN 9780786929382	Minotaur Wars
06/2003	Dragonlance	Night of the Dragons	Novel	Margaret Weis & Tracy Hickman	ISBN 0-7869-3090-X	Young Adult Chronicles (Note: This is a reprint of the second half of Dragons of Autumn Twilight re-written for a young adult audience.)
07/2003	Dragonlance	The Middle of Nowhere	Novel	Paul B. Thompson	ISBN 0-7869-3061-6	Crossroads
07/2003	Forgotten Realms	Twilight Falling	Novel	Paul S. Kemp	ISBN 978-0-7869-2998-6	The Erevis Cale Trilogy
07/2003	Forgotten Realms	The Alabaster Staff	Novel	Edward Bolme	ISBN 978-0-7869-2962-7	The Rogues
07/2003	D&D	The Sundered Arms	Novel	T. H. Lain	ISBN 978-07869-2974-0	Iconics
08/2003	Dragonlance	City of the Lost	Novel	Mary H. Herbert	ISBN 0-7869-2986-3	Linsha
09/2003	Dragonlance	The Annotated Legends	Novel	Margaret Weis & Tracy Hickman	ISBN 0-7869-2992-8	Legends (Note: This contains all 3 books of the trilogy and notes from the authors.)
09/2003	Forgotten Realms	Legacy of the Drow: Gift Set	Novel	R.A. Salvatore	ISBN 978-0-7869-3001-2	Legacy of the Drow
09/2003	Forgotten Realms	The Black Bouquet	Novel	Richard Lee Byers	ISBN 978-0-7869-3042-5	The Rogues
10/2003	Dragonlance	The Nightmare Lands	Novel	Margaret Weis & Tracy Hickman	ISBN 0-7869-3093-4	Young Adult Chronicles (Note: This is a reprint of the first half of Dragons of Winter Night re-written for a young adult audience.)
10/2003	Dragonlance	Redemption	Novel	Jean Rabe	ISBN 0-7869-3006-3	Dhamon Saga
10/2003	Forgotten Realms	The Lone Drow	Novel	R.A. Salvatore	ISBN 978-0-7869-3228-3	The Hunter's Blade Trilogy
10/2003	Dragonlance	To the Gates of Palanthas	Novel	Margaret Weis & Tracy Hickman	ISBN 0-7869-3096-9	Young Adult Chronicles (Note: This is a reprint of the second half of Dragons of Winter Night re-written for a young adult audience.)
10/2003	D&D	Return of the Damned	Novel	T. H. Lain	ISBN 978-07869-3003-6	Iconics
11/2003	Dragonlance	Dark Thane	Novel	Jeff Crook	ISBN 0-7869-2941-3	Age of Mortals
11/2003	Forgotten Realms	The Best of the Realms	Anthology (Note: This anthology is a "best of" with all of the short stories being published first in another of the anthologies.)	R.A. Salvatore editor	ISBN 978-0-7869-3024-1	Forgotten Realms
11/2003	Forgotten Realms	Rite of Blood	Short story	Elaine Cunningham	(Note: This short story is one of the reprinted stories in The Best of the Realms.)	
11/2003	Forgotten Realms	Elminster at the Magefair	Short story	Ed Greenwood		
11/2003	Forgotten Realms	Darksword	Short story	Troy Denning		
11/2003	Forgotten Realms	Blood Sport	Short story	Christie Golden		
11/2003	Forgotten Realms	Six of Swords	Short story	William W. Connors		
11/2003	Forgotten Realms	The Rose Window	Short story	Monte Cook		
11/2003	Forgotten Realms	The First Moonwell	Short story	Douglas Niles		
11/2003	Forgotten Realms	The Greatest Hero Who Ever Died	Short story	J. Robert King		
11/2003	Forgotten Realms	Tertius and the Artifact	Short story	Jeff Grubb		
11/2003	Forgotten Realms	Red Ambition	Short story	Jean Rabe		
11/2003	Forgotten Realms	The Common Spell	Short story	Kate Novak-Grubb		
11/2003	Forgotten Realms	Assassin's Shadow	Short story	Jess Lebow		
11/2003	Forgotten Realms	And the Dark Tide Rises	Short story	Keith Francis Strohm		
11/2003	Forgotten Realms	Empty Joys	Short story	R.A. Salvatore		
11/2003	Forgotten Realms	The Sapphire Crescent	Novel	Thomas M. Reid	ISBN 978-0-7869-3027-2	The Scions of Arrabar Trilogy
12/2003	Forgotten Realms	The Crimson Gold	Novel	Voronica Whitney-Robinson	ISBN 978-0-7869-3120-0	The Rogues
12/2003	Dragonlance	Hope's Flame	Novel	Margaret Weis & Tracy Hickman	ISBN 0-7869-3099-3	Young Adult Chronicles (Note: This is a reprint of the first half of Dragons of Spring Dawning re-written for a young adult audience.)
12/2003	Dragonlance	Sacred Fire	Novel	Chris Pierson	ISBN 0-7869-3036-5	Kingpriest
12/2003	D&D	Death Ray	Novel	T. H. Lain	ISBN 978-07869-3030-2	Iconics
01/2004	Forgotten Realms	Extinction	Novel	Lisa Smedman	ISBN 978-0-7869-2989-4	War of the Spider Queen
02/2004	Dragonlance	The Wizard's Fate	Novel	Paul B. Thompson & Tonya C. Cook	ISBN 0-7869-3214-7	Ergoth
02/2004	Forgotten Realms	The Yellow Silk	Novel	Don Bassingthwaite	ISBN 978-0-7869-3152-1	The Rogues
02/2004	Forgotten Realms	Paths of Darkness: Collector's Edition	Novel	R.A. Salvatore	ISBN 978-0-7869-3155-2	Paths of Darkness
03/2004	Dragonlance	A Dawn of Dragons	Novel	Margaret Weis & Tracy Hickman	ISBN 0-7869-3102-7	Young Adult Chronicles (Note: This is a reprint of the second half of Dragons of Spring Dawning re-written for a young adult audience.)
03/2004	Forgotten Realms	Venom's Taste	Novel	Lisa Smedman	ISBN 978-07869-3166-8	House of Serpents
04/2004	Dragonlance	Tides of Blood	Novel	Richard A. Knaak	ISBN 0-7869-3637-1	Minotaur Wars
04/2004	Forgotten Realms	The Rage	Novel	Richard Lee Byers	ISBN 978-0-7869-3187-3	The Year of Rogue Dragons
05/2004	Dragonlance	The Search for Power: Dragons from the War of Souls	Anthology	Margaret Weis editor (Note: Authors of these short stories include Richard A. Knaak, Nancy Varian Berberick, John Helfers, Jamie Chambers, Dan Willis, Douglas W. Clark, Jean Rabe, Jeff Grubb, Lucien Soulban, Miranda Horner, Kevin T. Stein, Paul B. Thompson, & Douglas Niles.)	ISBN 0-7869-3193-0	Tales/Dragons from the War of Souls/World of Krynn
05/2004	Forgotten Realms	Elminster's Daughter	Novel	Ed Greenwood	ISBN 978-0-7869-3199-6	The Elminster Series
06/2004	Dragonlance	Prisoner of Haven	Novel	Nancy Varian Berberick	ISBN 0-7869-3327-5	Age of Mortals
06/2004	Forgotten Realms	Dawn of Night	Novel	Paul S. Kemp	ISBN 978-0-7869-3225-2	The Erevis Cale Trilogy
07/2004	Forgotten Realms	Annihilation	Novel	Philip Athans	ISBN 978-0-7869-3237-5	War of the Spider Queen
07/2004	Dragonlance	Wizard's Conclave	Novel	Douglas Niles	ISBN 0-7869-3351-8	Age of Mortals
07/2004	Dragonlance	Temple of the Dragonslayer	Young Adult Novel	Tim Waggoner	ISBN 0-7869-3321-6	New Adventures
07/2004	Dragonlance	The Dying Kingdom	Young Adult Novel	Stephen D. Sullivan	ISBN 0-7869-3324-0	New Adventures
07/2004	Forgotten Realms	Lady of Poison	Novel	Bruce R. Cordell	ISBN 978-0-7869-3161-3	The Priests
08/2004	Dragonlance	Amber and Ashes	Novel	Margaret Weis	ISBN 0-7869-3257-0	Dark Disciple
08/2004	Forgotten Realms	Forsaken House	Novel	Richard Baker	ISBN 978-0-7869-3260-3	The Last Mythal
08/2004	Forgotten Realms	Paths of Darkness: Gift Set	Novel	R.A. Salvatore	ISBN 978-0-7869-3349-5	Paths of Darkness
09/2004	Dragonlance	Flight of the Fallen	Novel	Mary H. Herbert	ISBN 0-7869-3245-7	Linsha
09/2004	Dragonlance	The Dragon Well	Young Adult Novel	Dan Willis	ISBN 0-7869-3354-2	New Adventures
10/2004	Dragonlance	The Lake of Death (Note: Dhamon Grimwulf's story continues in this novel from both Dragons of a New Age and The Dhamon Saga.)	Novel	Jean Rabe	ISBN 9780786933648	Age of Mortals
10/2004	Forgotten Realms	The Two Swords	Novel	R.A. Salvatore	ISBN 978-0-7869-3790-5	The Hunter's Blade Trilogy
10/2004	Forgotten Realms	Realms of the Dragons	Anthology	Philip Athans editor	ISBN 978-0-7869-3394-5	Year of Rogue Dragons
10/2004	Forgotten Realms	Soulbound	Short Story	Paul S. Kemp	(Note: This short story is part of an anthology titled Realms of the Dragons.)	Year of Rogue Dragons
10/2004	Forgotten Realms	First Flight	Short Story	Edward Bolme		Year of Rogue Dragons
10/2004	Forgotten Realms	Gorlist's Dragon	Short Story	Elaine Cunningham		Year of Rogue Dragons
10/2004	Forgotten Realms	The Keeper of Secrets	Short Story	Ed Greenwood		Year of Rogue Dragons
10/2004	Forgotten Realms	The Topaz Dragon	Short Story	Jess Lebow		Year of Rogue Dragons
10/2004	Forgotten Realms	Wickless in the Nether	Short Story	R.A. Salvatore		Year of Rogue Dragons
10/2004	Forgotten Realms	Serpestrillvith	Short Story	Richard Baker		Year of Rogue Dragons
10/2004	Forgotten Realms	Waylaid	Short Story	Thomas M. Reid		Year of Rogue Dragons
10/2004	Forgotten Realms	Standard Delving Procedure	Short Story	Lisa Smedman		Year of Rogue Dragons
10/2004	Forgotten Realms	An Icy Heart	Short Story	Voronica Whitney-Robinson		Year of Rogue Dragons
10/2004	Forgotten Realms	Penitential Rites	Short Story	Keith Francis Strohm		Year of Rogue Dragons
10/2004	Forgotten Realms	How Sharper Than a Serpent's Tooth	Short Story	Dave Gross		Year of Rogue Dragons
10/2004	Forgotten Realms	Beer with a Fat Dragon	Short Story	Don Bassingthwaite		Year of Rogue Dragons
10/2004	Forgotten Realms	The Prisoner of Hulburg	Short Story	Richard Lee Byers		Year of Rogue Dragons
11/2004	Forgotten Realms	The Ruby Guardian	Novel	Thomas M. Reid	ISBN 978-0-7869-3382-2	The Scions of Arrabar Trilogy
11/2004	Dragonlance	Return of the Sorceress	Young Adult Novel	Tim Waggoner	ISBN 0-7869-3385-2	New Adventures
11/2004	Dragonlance	Dragons in the Archives: The Best of Weis and Hickman Anthology	Anthology	(Note: A collection of stories culled from the Tales and Dragon Anthologies with additional non-fiction pieces by Jeff Grubb, Douglas Niles, Michael Williams, Jean Blashfield Black, & Jamie Chambers recalling the development of Dragonlance.)	ISBN 9780786936694	Best of Anthologies
12/2004	Forgotten Realms	Mistress of the Night	Novel	Dave Gross & Don Bassingthwaite	ISBN 978-0-7869-3346-4	The Priests
12/2004	Dragonlance	A Hero's Justice	Novel	Paul B. Thompson & Tonya C. Cook	ISBN 0-7869-3397-6	Ergoth
01/2005	Dragonlance	Dragon Sword	Young Adult Novel	Ree Soesbee	ISBN 0-7869-3578-2	New Adventures
01/2005	Forgotten Realms	The Rite	Novel	Richard Lee Byers	ISBN 978-0-7869-3581-9	The Year of Rogue Dragons
02/2005	Eberron	The City of Towers	Novel	Keith Baker	ISBN 0-7869-3584-7	The Dreaming Dark
02/2005	Dragonlance	Return of the Exile	Novel	Mary H. Herbert	ISBN 0-7869-3628-2	Linsha
03/2005	Dragonlance	Dragon Day	Young Adult Novel	Stan Brown	ISBN 0-7869-3622-3	New Adventures
03/2005	Dragonlance	Lord of the Rose	Novel	Douglas Niles	ISBN 0-7869-3146-9	Rise of Solamnia
03/2005	Eberron	Marked for Death	Novel	Matt Forbeck	ISBN 0-7869-3610-X	The Lost Mark
03/2005	Forgotten Realms	Viper's Kiss	Novel	Lisa Smedman	ISBN 978-07869-3616-8	House of Serpents
04/2005	Dragonlance	Blades of the Tiger	Novel	Chris Pierson	ISBN 0-7869-3569-3	Taladas
04/2005	Forgotten Realms	Resurrection	Novel	Paul S. Kemp	ISBN 978-0-7869-3640-3	War of the Spider Queen
05/2005	Dragonlance	Dragon Knight	Young Adult Novel	Dan Willis	ISBN 0-7869-3735-1	New Adventures
05/2005	Dragonlance	Empire of Blood	Novel	Richard A. Knaak	ISBN 0-7869-3978-8	Minotaur Wars
05/2005	Eberron	The Crimson Talisman	Novel	Adrian Cole (writer)	ISBN 0-7869-3739-4	The War-Torn
05/2005	Forgotten Realms	Realms of the Dragons II	Anthology	Philip Athans editor	ISBN 978-0-7869-3808-7	Year of Rogue Dragons
05/2005	Forgotten Realms	Faerie Ire	Short Story	Erin Tettensor	(Note: This short story is part of an anthology titled Realms of the Dragons II.)	Year of Rogue Dragons
05/2005	Forgotten Realms	The Woman Who Drew Dragons	Short Story	Rosemary Jones		Year of Rogue Dragons
05/2005	Forgotten Realms	The Hunting Game	Short Story	Erik Scott de Bie		Year of Rogue Dragons
05/2005	Forgotten Realms	The Road Home	Short Story	Harley Stroh		Year of Rogue Dragons
05/2005	Forgotten Realms	How Burlmarr Saved the Unseen Protector	Short Story	Kameron M. Franklin		Year of Rogue Dragons
05/2005	Forgotten Realms	A Tall Tale	Short Story	J. L. Collins		Year of Rogue Dragons
05/2005	Forgotten Realms	The Book Dragon	Short Story	Jim Pitrat		Year of Rogue Dragons
05/2005	Forgotten Realms	Freedom's Promise	Short Story	Ed Gentry		Year of Rogue Dragons
05/2005	Forgotten Realms	Possessions	Short Story	James P. Davis		Year of Rogue Dragons
05/2005	Forgotten Realms	Queen of the Mountain	Short Story	Jaleigh Johnson		Year of Rogue Dragons
05/2005	Forgotten Realms	The Strength of the Jester	Short Story	Murray J. D. Leeder		Year of Rogue Dragons
07/2005	Dragonlance	Dragon Spell	Young Adult Novel	Jeff Sampson	ISBN 0-7869-3744-0	New Adventures
07/2005	Forgotten Realms	Maiden of Pain	Novel	Kameron M. Franklin	ISBN 978-0-7869-3764-6	The Priests
07/2005	Forgotten Realms	The Best of the Realms II: The Stories of Ed Greenwood	Anthology (Note: This anthology is a "best of" with all of the short stories being published first in another of the anthologies, and all are authored by Ed Greenwood)	Susan J. Morris (editor) & Ed Greenwood	ISBN 978-0-7869-3760-8	Forgotten Realms
07/2005	Forgotten Realms	Farthest Reach	Novel	Richard Baker	ISBN 978-0-7869-3756-1	The Last Mythal
07/2005	Forgotten Realms	Not the Most Successful of Feasts	Short story	Ed Greenwood	(Note: This short story is one of the stories, by Ed Greenwood, in The Best of the Realms II: The Stories of Ed Greenwood.)	
07/2005	Forgotten Realms	Dark Talons Forbear Thee	Short story	Ed Greenwood		
07/2005	Forgotten Realms	The Whispering Crown	Short story	Ed Greenwood		
07/2005	Forgotten Realms	So High a Price	Short story	Ed Greenwood		
07/2005	Forgotten Realms	One Comes, Unheralded, to Zirta	Short story	Ed Greenwood		
07/2005	Forgotten Realms	A Dance in Storm's Garden	Short story	Ed Greenwood		
07/2005	Forgotten Realms	A Slow Day in Skullport	Short story	Ed Greenwood		
07/2005	Forgotten Realms	Bloodbound	Short story	Ed Greenwood		
07/2005	Forgotten Realms	How Wisdom Came to the Maimed Wizard	Short story	Ed Greenwood		
07/2005	Forgotten Realms	The Eye of the Dragon	Short story	Ed Greenwood		
07/2005	Forgotten Realms	Nothing but Trouble	Short story	Ed Greenwood		
07/2005	Forgotten Realms	The Grinning Ghost of Taverton Hall	Short story	Ed Greenwood		
07/2005	Forgotten Realms	The Place Where Guards Snore at Their Posts	Short story	Ed Greenwood		
07/2005	Forgotten Realms	Living Forever	Short story	Ed Greenwood		
07/2005	Forgotten Realms	The Long Road Home	Short story	Ed Greenwood		
08/2005	Forgotten Realms	The City of Splendors: A Waterdeep Novel	Novel	Ed Greenwood & Elaine Cunningham	ISBN 978-0-7869-3766-0	The Cities
08/2005	Eberron	The Binding Stone	Novel	Don Bassingthwaite	ISBN 0-7869-3784-X	The Dragon Below
08/2005	Forgotten Realms	The Emerald Scepter	Novel	Thomas M. Reid	ISBN 978-0-7869-3754-7	The Scions of Arrabar Trilogy
08/2005	Forgotten Realms	Starlight & Shadows Gift Set	Novel	Elaine Cunningham	978-0-7869-3816-2	Starlight & Shadows
09/2005	Forgotten Realms	Master of Chains	Novel	Jess Lebow	ISBN 978-0-7869-3800-1	The Fighters
09/2005	Forgotten Realms	Queen of the Depths	Novel	Richard Lee Byers	ISBN 978-0-7869-3737-0	The Priests
10/2005	Eberron	The Orb of Xoriat	Novel	Edward Bolme	ISBN 0-7869-3819-6	The War-Torn
10/2005	Dragonlance	Sanctuary	Novel	Paul B. Thompson & Tonya C. Cook	ISBN 9780786938179	Elven Exiles
10/2005	Dragonlance	Wizard's Curse	Young Adult Novel	Christina Woods	ISBN 0-7869-3794-7	Trinistyr Trilogy
10/2005	Forgotten Realms	Promise of the Witch-King	Novel	R.A. Salvatore	ISBN 978-0-7869-3823-0	The Sellswords
11/2005	Greyhawk	Return to Quag Keep	Novel	Andre Norton and Jean Rabe	978-0-7653-1298-3	Quag Keep
11/2005	Forgotten Realms	Whisper of Waves	Novel	Philip Athans	ISBN 978-0-7869-3837-7	The Watercourse Trilogy
11/2005	Dragonlance	Crown of Thieves	Young Adult Novel	Ree Soesbee	ISBN 0-7869-3833-1	Elidor Trilogy
11/2005	Forgotten Realms	Midnight's Mask	Novel	Paul S. Kemp	ISBN 978-0-7869-3643-4	The Erevis Cale Trilogy
12/2005	Forgotten Realms	Ghostwalker	Novel	Erik Scott de Bie	ISBN 978-0-7869-3962-6	The Fighters
2006	Greyhawk	The Return of Gord	Short story	E. Gary Gygax & K.R. Bourgoine		
2006	Mystara	The Voyage of the Princess Ark	Comic	Bruce Heard	[nb]	Dragon Magazine #154-188
2006	Mystara	The Beast of Averoigne	online short story	Clark Ashton Smith		
01/2006	Dragonlance	Wizard's Betrayal	Young Adult Novel	Jeff Sampson	ISBN 0-7869-3993-1	Trinistyr Trilogy
01/2006	Dragonlance	Saving Solace	Novel	Douglas W. Clark	ISBN 0-7869-3977-X	Champions
01/2006	Eberron	Road to Death	Novel	Matt Forbeck	ISBN 0-7869-3987-7	The Lost Mark
01/2006	Forgotten Realms	Son of Thunder	Novel	Murray J.D. Leeder	ISBN 978-0-7869-3960-2	The Fighters
02/2006	Eberron	The Shattered Land	Novel	Keith Baker	ISBN 0-7869-3821-8	The Dreaming Dark
02/2006	Dragonlance	Amber and Iron	Novel	Margaret Weis	ISBN 0-7869-3796-3	Dark Disciple
02/2006	Forgotten Realms	Realms of the Elves	Anthology	Philip Athans (editor) (Note: Authors of the stories in this anthology include Richard Lee Byers, Philip Athans, Lisa Smedman, Erik Scott de Bie, R.A. Salvatore, Ed Greenwood, & Richard Baker.)	ISBN 978-0-7869-3980-0	Last Mythal
03/2006	Dragonlance	The Crystal Chalice	Young Adult Novel	Ree Soesbee	ISBN 9780786939947	Elidor Trilogy
03/2006	Eberron	The Grieving Tree	Novel	Don Bassingthwaite	ISBN 0-7869-3985-0	The Dragon Below
03/2006	Forgotten Realms	Vanity's Brood	Novel	Lisa Smedman	ISBN 978-07869-3982-4	House of Serpents
04/2006	Forgotten Realms	Bladesinger	Novel	Keith Francis Strohm	ISBN 978-0-7869-3835-3	The Fighters
04/2006	Dragonlance	Trail of the Black Wyrm	Novel	Chris Pierson	ISBN 0-7869-3979-6	Taladas
04/2006	Eberron	Tales of the Last War	Anthology	Mark Sehestedt (Editor)	ISBN 0-7869-3986-9	
05/2006	Eberron	Thieves of Blood	Novel	Tim Waggoner	ISBN 0-7869-4005-0	The Blade of the Flame
05/2006	Dragonlance	Wizard's Return	Young Adult Novel	Dan Willis	ISBN 0-7869-4025-5	Trinistyr Trilogy
05/2006	Forgotten Realms	The Ruin	Novel	Richard Lee Byers	ISBN 978-0-7869-4003-5	The Year of Rogue Dragons
06/2006	Forgotten Realms	Final Gate	Novel	Richard Baker	ISBN 978-0-7869-4002-8	The Last Mythal
06/2006	Dragonlance	Dragons: Worlds Afire	Anthology	R.A. Salvatore, Margaret Weis, Tracy Hickman, Keith Baker, & Scott McGough	ISBN 0-7869-4166-9	Further Dragons Anthologies
06/2006	Eberron	Eberron: Eye of the Wolf	Graphic novel	Keith Baker, Chris Lie		
06/2006	Multiple (Note: This anthology contained one story each from Eberron, Forgotten Realms, Dragonlance & Magic: The Gathering)	Dragons: World Afire	Anthology	R.A. Salvatore, Margaret Weis, Tracy Hickman, Scott McGough	ISBN 0-7869-4166-9	
06/2006	Dragonlance	The Crown and the Sword	Novel	Douglas Niles	ISBN 0-7869-3788-2	Rise of Solamnia
06/2006	Eberron	Voyage of the Mourning Dawn	Novel	Rich Wulf	ISBN 0-7869-4006-9	Heirs of Ash
07/2006	Dragonlance	City of Fortune	Young Adult Novel	Ree Soesbee	ISBN 0-7869-4026-3	Elidor Trilogy
07/2006	Eberron	In the Claws of the Tiger	Novel	James Wyatt	ISBN 0-7869-4015-8	The War-Torn
07/2006	Dragonlance	Dragons of the Dwarven Depths	Novel	Margaret Weis & Tracy Hickman	ISBN 0-7869-4099-9	The Lost Chronicles Trilogy
07/2006	Forgotten Realms	Blackstaff	Novel	Steven E. Schend	ISBN 978-0-7869-4016-5	The Wizards
07/2006	Forgotten Realms	Bloodwalk	Novel	James P. Davis	ISBN 978-0-7869-4018-9	The Wizards
08/2006	Dragonlance	The Alien Sea (Note: The Alien Sea picks up where the short story Song of the Mother from the Dragons of Time anthology ends.)	Novel	Lucien Soulban	ISBN 0-7869-4082-4	Champions
08/2006	Forgotten Realms	Swords of Eveningstar	Novel	Ed Greenwood	ISBN 978-0-7869-4022-6	The Knights of Myth Drannor Trilogy
09/2006	Eberron	Blood and Honor	Novel	Graeme Davis	ISBN 0-7869-4069-7	The War-Torn
09/2006	Forgotten Realms	Lies of Light	Novel	Philip Athans	ISBN 978-0-7869-4019-6	The Watercourse Trilogy
09/2006	Dragonlance	The Wayward Wizard	Young Adult Novel	Jeff Sampson	ISBN 0-7869-4163-4	Suncatcher Trilogy
09/2006	Forgotten Realms	War of the Spider Queen: Gift Set, Part I (Books 1-3)	Novel	R.A. Salvatore editor, Richard Lee Byers, Thomas M. Reid, & Richard Baker	ISBN 978-0-7869-4186-5	War of the Spider Queen (Note: This boxed gift set contains the first three novels in the War of the Spider Queen series, Dissolution, Insurrection, & Condemnation.)
09/2006	Forgotten Realms	War of the Spider Queen: Gift Set, Part II (Books 4-6)	Novel	R.A. Salvatore editor, Lisa Smedman, Philip Athans, & Paul S. Kemp	ISBN 978-0-7869-4307-4	War of the Spider Queen (Note: This boxed gift set contains the second three novels in the War of the Spider Queen series, Extinction, Annihilation, & Resurrection.)
09/2006	Forgotten Realms	Darkvision	Novel	Bruce R. Cordell	ISBN 978-0-7869-4017-2	The Wizards
10/2006	Mystara	The Collosus of Ylourgne	online short story	Clark Ashton Smith		
10/2006	Mystara	The Enchantress of Sylaire	online short story	Clark Ashton Smith		
10/2006	Mystara	The Holiness of Azedarac	online short story	Clark Ashton Smith		
10/2006	Mystara	A Rendezvous in Averoigne	online short story	Clark Ashton Smith		
10/2006	Mystara	The Tomb-Spawn	online short story	Clark Ashton Smith		
10/2006	Forgotten Realms	Road of the Patriarch	Novel	R.A. Salvatore	ISBN 978-0-7869-4075-2	The Sellswords
10/2006	Dragonlance	Alliances	Novel	Paul B. Thompson & Tonya C. Cook	ISBN 978-0-7869-4076-9	Elven Exiles
10/2006	Eberron	Queen of Death	Novel	Matt Forbeck	ISBN 0-7869-4012-3	The Lost Mark
10/2006	Dragonlance	Dragonlance Chronicles: Special Edition	Novel	Margaret Weis & Tracy Hickman	ISBN 0-7869-4298-3	The Chronicles Trilogy (Note: This version is all three of the original trilogy with notes from the authors in a premium leather bound book.)
11/2006	Forgotten Realms	Shadowbred	Novel	Paul S. Kemp	ISBN 978-0-7869-4077-6	Twilight War
11/2006	Eberron	The Gates of Night	Novel	Keith Baker	ISBN 0-7869-4013-1	The Dreaming Dark
11/2006	Dragonlance	Warrior's Heart	Young Adult Novel	Stephen D. Sullivan	ISBN 0-7869-4187-1	Goodlund Trilogy
12/2006	Forgotten Realms	Frostfell	Novel	Mark Sehestedt	ISBN 978-0-7869-4245-9	The Wizards
12/2006	Eberron	The Killing Song	Novel	Don Bassingthwaite	ISBN 0-7869-4243-6	The Dragon Below
2007	Mystara	The Black Abbot of Puthuum	online short story	Clark Ashton Smith		
01/2007	Dragonlance	The Measure and the Truth	Novel	Douglas Niles	ISBN 0-7869-4247-9	Rise of Solamnia
01/2007	Dragonlance	Pillar of Flame	Young Adult Novel	Ree Soesbee	ISBN 0-7869-4248-7	Elements
01/2007	Forgotten Realms	The Hunter's Blades Collector's Edition	Novel	R.A. Salvatore	ISBN 978-0-7869-4315-9	The Hunter's Blade Trilogy
02/2007	Forgotten Realms	Sacrifice of the Widow	Novel	Lisa Smedman	ISBN 978-0-7869-4250-3	The Lady Penitent
02/2007	Eberron	Flight of the Dying Sun	Novel	Rich Wulf	ISBN 0-7869-4316-5	Heirs of Ash
03/2007	Eberron	Forge of the Mindslayers	Novel	Tim Waggoner	ISBN 9780786943135	The Blade of the Flame
03/2007	Dragonlance	The Great White Wyrm	Novel	Peter Archer	ISBN 0-7869-4260-6	Champions
03/2007	Dragonlance	The Ebony Eye	Young Adult Novel	Jeff Sampson	ISBN 978-0-7869-4255-8	Suncatcher Trilogy
03/2007	Forgotten Realms	Depths of Madness	Novel	Erik Scott de Bie	ISBN 978-0-7869-4314-2	The Dungeons
04/2007	Dragonlance	Dragons of Time	Anthology	Margaret Weis & Tracy Hickman editors (Note: Authors of these short stories include Lizz Weis, Cam Banks, Paul B. Thompson, Jean Rabe, Douglas W. Clark, Rachel Gobar, Jake Bell, Kevin T. Stein, Richard A. Knaak, Lucien Soulban, Mary H. Herbert, Miranda Horner, & Margaret Weis.)	ISBN 0-7869-4295-9	Further Dragons Anthologies
04/2007	Eberron	Bound by Iron	Novel	Edward Bolme	ISBN 978-0-7869-4264-0	The Inquisitives
04/2007	Forgotten Realms	Unclean	Novel	Richard Lee Byers	ISBN 978-0-7869-4258-9	Haunted Lands
05/2007	Eberron	Night of the Long Shadows	Novel	Paul Crilley	ISBN 978-0-7869-4270-1	The Abraxis Wren Chronicles
05/2007	Dragonlance	Warrior's Blood	Young Adult Novel	Stephen D. Sullivan	ISBN 0-7869-4300-9	Goodlund Trilogy
05/2007	Forgotten Realms	The Best of the Realms III: The Stories of Elaine Cunningham	Anthology (Note: This anthology contains short stories, all written by Elaine Cunningham.)	Philip Athans & Erin Evans editors & Elaine Cunningham	ISBN 978-0-7869-4288-6	Forgotten Realms
05/2007	Forgotten Realms	The Knights of Samular	Short Story	Elaine Cunningham	(Note: This short story is one of the collection of short stories on the anthology, The Best of the Realms III: The Stories of Elaine Cunningham.)	
05/2007	Forgotten Realms	The Bargain	Short Story	Elaine Cunningham		
05/2007	Forgotten Realms	Elminster's Jest	Short Story	Elaine Cunningham		
05/2007	Forgotten Realms	The More Things Change	Short Story	Elaine Cunningham		
05/2007	Forgotten Realms	The Direct Approach	Short Story	Elaine Cunningham		
05/2007	Forgotten Realms	Secrets of Blood, Spirits of the Sea	Short Story	Elaine Cunningham		
05/2007	Forgotten Realms	The Great Hunt	Short Story	Elaine Cunningham		
05/2007	Forgotten Realms	Speaking With the Dead	Short Story	Elaine Cunningham		
05/2007	Forgotten Realms	Stolen Dreams	Short Story	Elaine Cunningham		
05/2007	Forgotten Realms	Fire is Fire	Short Story	Elaine Cunningham		
05/2007	Forgotten Realms	Possessions	Short Story	Elaine Cunningham		
05/2007	Forgotten Realms	A Little Knowledge	Short Story	Elaine Cunningham		
05/2007	Forgotten Realms	Games of Chance	Short Story	Elaine Cunningham		
05/2007	Forgotten Realms	Tribute	Short Story	Elaine Cunningham		
05/2007	Forgotten Realms	Answered Prayers	Short Story	Elaine Cunningham		
05/2007	Forgotten Realms	The Gossamer Plain	Novel	Thomas M. Reid	ISBN 978-0-7869-4024-0	The Empyrean Odyssey
06/2007	Eberron	Legacy of Wolves	Novel	Marsheila Rockwell	ISBN 978-0-7869-4293-0	The Inquisitives
06/2007	Forgotten Realms	Scream of Stone	Novel	Philip Athans	ISBN 978-0-7869-4271-8	The Watercourse Trilogy
06/2007	Dragonlance	Shadow of the Flame	Novel	Chris Pierson	ISBN 0-7869-4254-1	Taladas
07/2007	Dragonlance	Queen of the Sea	Young Adult Novel	Ree Soesbee	ISBN 0-7869-4281-9	Elements
07/2007	Dragonlance	Dragons of the Highlord Skies	Novel	Margaret Weis & Tracy Hickman	ISBN 0-7869-4860-4	The Lost Chronicles Trilogy
07/2007	Eberron	The Left Hand of Death	Novel	Parker Dewolf	ISBN 9780786947133	The Lanternlight Files
07/2007	Forgotten Realms	The Howling Delve	Novel	Jaleigh Johnson	ISBN 978-0-7869-4278-7	The Dungeons
08/2007	Forgotten Realms	Swords of Dragonfire	Novel	Ed Greenwood	ISBN 978-0-7869-4339-5	The Knights of Myth Drannor Trilogy
08/2007	Forgotten Realms	Storm of the Dead	Novel	Lisa Smedman	ISBN 978-0-7869-4701-0	The Lady Penitent
08/2007	Eberron	Storm Dragon	Novel	James Wyatt	ISBN 978-0-7869-4710-2	The Draconic Prophecies
08/2007	Dragonlance	The Rebellion	Novel	Jean Rabe	ISBN 0-7869-4280-0	The Stonetellers
08/2007	Forgotten Realms	Shadowstorm	Novel	Paul S. Kemp	ISBN 978-0-7869-4304-3	Twilight War
08/2007	Forgotten Realms	The Hunter's Blades Trilogy Gift Set	Novel	R.A. Salvatore	ISBN 978-0-7869-4727-0	The Hunter's Blade Trilogy
09/2007	Dragonlance	The Stolen Sun	Young Adult Novel	Jeff Sampson	ISBN 0-7869-4291-6	Suncatcher Trilogy
09/2007	Dragonlance	Destiny	Novel	Paul B. Thompson & Tonya C. Cook	ISBN 0-7869-4273-8	Elven Exiles
09/2007	Forgotten Realms	The Last Mythal: Gift Set	Novel	Richard Baker	ISBN 978-0-7869-4712-6	The Last Mythal
09/2007	Forgotten Realms	The Orc King	Novel	R.A. Salvatore	ISBN 978-0-7869-4340-1	Transitions
10/2007	Dragonlance	Protecting Palanthas	Novel	Douglas W. Clark	ISBN 0-7869-4808-6	Champions
10/2007	Forgotten Realms	Stardeep	Novel	Bruce R. Cordell	ISBN 978-0-7869-4338-8	The Dungeons
10/2007	Ravenloft	Before I Wake	Online Short Story	Ari Marmell		
10/2007	Eberron	Rise of the Seventh Moon	Novel	Rich Wulf	ISBN 0-7869-4342-4	Heirs of Ash
11/2007	Forgotten Realms	Crypt of the Moaning Diamond	Novel	Rosemary Jones	ISBN 978-0-7869-4714-0	The Dungeons
11/2007	Dragonlance	Warrior's Bones	Young Adult Novel	Stephen D. Sullivan	ISBN 0-7869-4268-1	Goodlund Trilogy
11/2007	Dragonlance	The Secret of Pax Tharkas	Novel	Douglas Niles	ISBN 0-7869-4789-6	Dwarf Home
11/2007	Forgotten Realms	Neversfall	Novel	Ed Gentry	ISBN 978-0-7869-4782-9	The Citadels
11/2007	Forgotten Realms	The Annotated Elminster (Note: This is a collection of the first three volumes in the series in one book with notes from the author.)	Novel	Ed Greenwood	ISBN 978-0-7869-4799-7	The Elminster Series
12/2007	Dragonlance	Lost Leaves from the Inn of the Last Home	Collection	Margaret Weis (editor)	ISBN 1-931567-78-6	Leaves from the Inn of the Last Home
12/2007	Dragonlance	The Black Talon	Novel	Richard A. Knaak	ISBN 0-7869-4299-1	Ogre Titans
01/2008	Forgotten Realms	Realms of War	Anthology	Philip Athans (editor)	ISBN 978-0-7869-4934-2	Twilight War
02/2008	Eberron	Sea of Death	Novel	Tim Waggoner	ISBN 0-7869-4313-0	The Blade of the Flame
02/2008	Forgotten Realms	The Legend of Drizzt: Collector's Edition, Book I (Note: This is a set of all the books of The Dark Elf Trilogy in a single novel, starting the series The Legend of Drizzt, which is a compilation series.)	Novel	R.A. Salvatore	ISBN 978-0-7869-1176-9	The Legend of Drizzt
03/2008	Eberron	The Darkwood Mask	Novel	Jeff LaSala	ISBN 978-0-7869-4970-0	The Inquisitives
04/2008	Dragonlance	Tempest's Vow	Young Adult Novel	Ree Soesbee	ISBN 0-7869-4796-9	Elements
04/2008	Forgotten Realms	Obsidian Ridge	Novel	Jess Lebow	ISBN 978-0-7869-4785-0	The Citadels
04/2008	Dragonlance	The Sellsword	Novel	Cam Banks	ISBN 0-7869-4722-5	Anvil of Time
04/2008	Forgotten Realms	Undead	Novel	Richard Lee Byers	ISBN 978-0-7869-4783-6	Haunted Lands
05/2008	Forgotten Realms	The Shield of Weeping Ghosts	Novel	James P. Davis	ISBN 978-0-7869-4877-2	The Citadels
05/2008	Dragonlance	Amber and Blood	Novel	Margaret Weis	ISBN 0-7869-5001-3	Dark Disciple
05/2008	Forgotten Realms	The Swordmage	Novel	Richard Baker	ISBN 978-0-7869-4788-1	Blades of the Moonsea
06/2008	Forgotten Realms	Ascendancy of the Last	Novel	Lisa Smedman	ISBN 978-0-7869-4864-2	The Lady Penitent
06/2008	Eberron	Dragon Forge	Novel	James Wyatt		The Draconic Prophecies
07/2008	Forgotten Realms	Sentinelspire	Novel	Mark Sehestedt	ISBN 978-0-7869-4937-3	The Citadels
08/2008	Dragonlance	Death March	Novel	Jean Rabe	ISBN 0-7869-4917-1	The Stonetellers
08/2008	Eberron	The Doom of Kings	Novel	Don Bassingthwaite		The Legacy of Dhakaan
09/2008	Ravenloft	Heaven's Bones	Novel	Samantha Henderson	ISBN 0-7869-5111-7	
09/2008	Forgotten Realms	The Stowaway	Novel	R.A. Salvatore & Geno Salvatore	ISBN 978-0-7869-5094-2	Stone of Tymora
	Ravenloft	Black Crusade	Online Novel	Ari Marmell		
09/2008	Forgotten Realms	Blackstaff Tower	Novel	Steven E. Schend	ISBN 978-0-7869-4913-7	Waterdeep
09/2008	Forgotten Realms	Mistshore	Novel	Jaleigh Johnson	ISBN 978-0-7869-4966-3	Waterdeep
10/2008	Dragonlance	Heir of Kayolin	Novel	Douglas Niles	ISBN 0-7869-5003-X	Dwarf Home
10/2008	Eberron	When Night Falls	Novel	Parker Dewolf		The Lanternlight Files
10/2008	Forgotten Realms	The Sellswords Gift Set	Novel	R.A. Salvatore	ISBN 978-0-7869-4910-6	The Sellswords
10/2008	Forgotten Realms	The Pirate King	Novel	R.A. Salvatore	ISBN 978-0-7869-4964-9	Transitions
11/2008	Forgotten Realms	The Sword Never Sleeps	Novel	Ed Greenwood	ISBN 978-0-7869-4914-4	The Knights of Myth Drannor Trilogy
11/2008	Dragonlance	The Survivors	Novel	Dan Willis	ISBN 0-7869-4723-3	Anvil of Time
11/2008	Ravenloft	Mithras Court: A Novel of the Mists	Novel	David A. Page	ISBN 0-7869-5068-4	
11/2008	Eberron	The Queen of Stone	Novel	Keith Baker		Thorn of Breland
11/2008	Forgotten Realms	The Fractured Sky	Novel	Thomas M. Reid	ISBN 978-0-7869-4807-9	The Empyrean Odyssey
12/2008	Dragonlance	The Fire Rose	Novel	Richard A. Knaak	ISBN 0-7869-4968-6	Ogre Titans
12/2008	Forgotten Realms	Plague of Spells	Novel	Bruce R. Cordell	ISBN 978-0-7869-4965-6	Abolethic Sovereignty
12/2008	Forgotten Realms	Shadowrealm	Novel	Paul S. Kemp	ISBN 978-0-7869-4863-5	Twilight War
01/2009	Forgotten Realms	The Fanged Crown	Novel	Jenna Helland	ISBN 978-0-7869-5093-5	The Wilds
03/2009	Dragonlance	Renegade Wizards	Novel	Lucien Soulban	ISBN 0-7869-5065-X	Anvil of Time
03/2009	Forgotten Realms	Corsair	Novel	Richard Baker	ISBN 978-0-7869-5307-3	Blades of the Moonsea
03/2009	Forgotten Realms	Unholy	Novel	Richard Lee Byers	ISBN 978-0-7869-5021-8	Haunted Lands
04/2009	Forgotten Realms	Threat from the Sea	Novel	Mel Odom	ISBN 978-0-7869-5055-3	The Threat from the Sea
04/2009	Forgotten Realms	Downshadow	Novel	Erik Scott de Bie	ISBN 978-0-7869-5128-4	Abyssal Plague
04/2009	Forgotten Realms	Downshadow	Novel	Erik Scott de Bie	ISBN 978-0-7869-5128-4	Waterdeep
04/2009	Forgotten Realms	City of the Dead	Novel	Rosemary Jones	ISBN 978-0-7869-5129-1	Waterdeep
05/2009	Forgotten Realms	The Restless Shore	Novel	James P. Davis	ISBN 978-0-7869-5131-4	The Wilds
06/2009	Dragonlance	The Forest King	Novel	Paul B. Thompson	ISBN 0-7869-5123-0	Anvil of Time
07/2009	Forgotten Realms	The Crystal Mountain	Novel	Thomas M. Reid	ISBN 978-0-7869-5235-9	The Empyrean Odyssey
08/2009	Eberron	Dragon War	Novel	James Wyatt		The Draconic Prophecies
08/2009	Forgotten Realms	The Edge of Chaos	Novel	Jak Koke	ISBN 978-0-7869-5189-5	The Wilds
09/2009	Dragonlance	Dragons of the Hourglass Mage	Novel	Margaret Weis & Tracy Hickman	ISBN 9780786949168	The Lost Chronicles Trilogy
09/2009	Eberron	Word of Traitors	Novel	Don Bassingthwaite		The Legacy of Dhakaan
09/2009	Forgotten Realms	City of Torment	Novel	Bruce R. Cordell	ISBN 978-0-7869-5184-0	Abolethic Sovereignty
10/2009	Forgotten Realms	The Ghost King	Novel	R.A. Salvatore	ISBN 978-0-7869-5233-5	Transitions
10/2009	Dragonlance	Goblin Nation	Novel	Jean Rabe	ISBN 0-7869-5153-2	The Stonetellers
10/2009	Forgotten Realms	House of Serpents	Novel	Lisa Smedman	ISBN 978-07869-5364-6	House of Serpents
11/2009	Eberron	Son of Khyber	Novel	Keith Baker		Thorn of Breland
11/2009	Forgotten Realms	The Fall of Highwatch	Novel	Mark Sehestedt	ISBN 978-0-7869-5143-7	Chosen of Nendawen
11/2009	Forgotten Realms	The Shadowmask	Novel	R.A. Salvatore & Geno Salvatore	ISBN 978-0-7869-5147-5	Stone of Tymora
12/2009	Forgotten Realms	Wrath of the Blue Lady	Novel	Mel Odom	ISBN 978-0-7869-5192-5	The Wilds
12/2009	Dragonlance	The Gargoyle King	Novel	Richard A. Knaak	ISBN 0-7869-5238-5	Ogre Titans
12/2009	Forgotten Realms	Return of the Archwizards	Novel	Troy Denning and others	ISBN 978-0-7869-5365-3	Return of the Archwizards

== 2010s ==
2010s
Date	Setting	Title	Type	Author(s)	ISBN	Series
01/2010	Dragonlance	The Fate of Thorbardin	Novel	Douglas Niles	ISBN 978-0-7869-5150-5	Dwarf Home
01/2010	Forgotten Realms	Realms of the Dead	Anthology	Susan J. Morris (editor)	ISBN 978-0-7869-5363-9	Haunted Lands
02/2010	Forgotten Realms	The God Catcher	Novel	Erin M. Evans	ISBN 978-0-7869-5486-5	Waterdeep
03/2010	Forgotten Realms	Avenger	Novel	Richard Baker	ISBN 978-0-7869-5575-6	Blades of the Moonsea
05/2010	Forgotten Realms	Circle of Skulls	Novel	James P. Davis	ISBN 978-0-7869-5485-8	Waterdeep
05/2010	Forgotten Realms	The Captive Flame	Novel	Richard Lee Byers	ISBN 978-0-7869-5396-7	Brotherhood of the Griffon
06/2010	Eberron	The Tyranny of Ghosts	Novel	Don Bassingthwaite		The Legacy of Dhakaan
06/2010	Forgotten Realms	The Erevis Cale Trilogy	Novel	Paul S. Kemp	ISBN 978-0-7869-5498-8	The Erevis Cale Trilogy
07/2010	Dragonlance	Dragonlance Chronicles Trilogy: A Dragonlance Omnibus	Novel	Margaret Weis & Tracy Hickman	ISBN 0-7869-5553-8	The Chronicles Trilogy (Note: This version is all three of the original trilogy.)
07/2010	Forgotten Realms	Unbroken Chain	Novel	Jaleigh Johnson	ISBN 978-0-7869-5626-5	Unbroken Chain
08/2010	Points of Light/Nerath	The Mark of Nerath	Novel	Bill Slavicsek		
08/2010	Eberron	Taint of the Black Brigade	Novel	Paul Crilley		The Abraxis Wren Chronicles
08/2010	Forgotten Realms	Elminster Must Die	Novel	Ed Greenwood	ISBN 978-0-7869-5193-2	The Sage of Shadowdale/The Elminster Series
09/2010	Forgotten Realms	Key of Stars	Novel	Bruce R. Cordell	ISBN 978-0-7869-5628-9	Abolethic Sovereignty
10/2010	Dark Sun	City Under the Sand	Novel	Jeff Mariotte	ISBN 978-0-7869-5623-4	
10/2010	Eberron	The Fading Dream	Novel	Keith Baker		Thorn of Breland
10/2010	Forgotten Realms	Gauntlgrym	Novel	R.A. Salvatore	ISBN 978-0-7869-5500-8	Neverwinter Saga
10/2010	Forgotten Realms	The Year of the Rogue Dragons	Novel	Richard Lee Byers	ISBN 978-0-7869-5574-9	The Year of the Rogue Dragons
11/2010	Eberron	Death Comes Easy	Novel	Parker De Wolf	ISBN 0-7869-4792-6	The Lanternlight Files
11/2010	Forgotten Realms	Whisper of Venom	Novel	Richard Lee Byers	ISBN 978-0-7869-5561-9	Brotherhood of the Griffon
11/2010	Forgotten Realms	Elminster Ascending (Note: This is a collection of the first three volumes in the series in one book.)	Novel	Ed Greenwood	ISBN 978-0-7869-5618-0	The Elminster Series
12/2010	Points of Light/Nerath	The Seal of Karga Kul	Novel	Alex Irvine		
12/2010	Eberron	Lady Ruin	Novel	Tim Waggoner	ISBN 0-7869-5625-9	Lady Ruin
12/2010	Forgotten Realms	The Sellswords: A Forgotten Realms Omnibus	Novel	R.A. Salvatore	ISBN 978-0-7869-5716-3	The Sellswords
12/2010	Forgotten Realms	The Hand of the Hunter	Novel	Mark Sehestedt	ISBN 978-0-7869-5627-2	Chosen of Nendawen
2011	Points of Light/Nerath	The Last Garrison	Novel	Matthew Beard		
02/2011	Forgotten Realms	The Collected Stories: The Legend of Drizzt	Anthology	Philip Athans editor	ISBN 978-0-7869-5738-5	The Legend of Drizzt
03/2011	Points of Light/Nerath	The Temple of the Yellow Skulls	Novel	Don Bassingthwaite		Abyssal Plague
03/2011	Forgotten Realms	The Empyrean Odyssey: A Forgotten Realms Omnibus	Novel	Thomas M. Reid	ISBN 978-0-7869-5768-2	The Empyrean Odyssey
03/2011	Forgotten Realms	Sandstorm	Novel	Christopher Rowe	ISBN 978-0-7869-5742-2	
04/2011	Forgotten Realms	Sword of the Gods	Novel	Bruce R. Cordell	ISBN 978-0-7869-5739-2	Abyssal Plague
05/2011	Forgotten Realms	Dawnbringer	Novel	Samantha Henderson	ISBN 978-0-7869-5794-1	
06/2011	Dark Sun	Under the Crimson Sun	Novel	Keith R.A. DeCandido	ISBN 978-0-7869-5797-2	Abyssal Plague
06/2011	Forgotten Realms	The Spectral Blaze	Novel	Richard Lee Byers	ISBN 978-0-7869-5798-9	Brotherhood of the Griffon
07/2011	Forgotten Realms	Unbroken Chain: The Darker Road	Novel	Jaleigh Johnson	ISBN 978-0-7869-5533-6	Unbroken Chain
07/2011	Forgotten Realms	Ed Greenwood Presents Waterdeep: Book 1	Novel	Ed Greenwood editor, Steven E. Schend, Jaleigh Johnson, & Erik Scott de Bie	ISBN 978-0-7869-5818-4	Waterdeep (Note: This compilation consists of the first three novels from the Waterdeep series, Blackstaff Tower, Mistshore, & Downshadow.)
07/2011	Eberron	Untold Adventures	Novel	Alan Dean Foster, Kevin J. Anderson, Mike Resnick	ISBN 0-7869-5837-5	Anthology
08/2011	Points of Light/Nerath	Oath of Vigilance	Novel	James Wyatt		Abyssal Plague
08/2011	Forgotten Realms	Bury Elminster Deep	Novel	Ed Greenwood	ISBN 978-0-7869-5815-3	The Sage of Shadowdale/The Elminster Series
08/2011	Forgotten Realms	The Last Mythal: A Forgotten Realms Omnibus	Novel	Richard Baker	ISBN 978-0-7869-5813-9	The Last Mythal
08/2011	Forgotten Realms	The Sentinels	Novel	R.A. Salvatore & Geno Salvatore	ISBN 978-0-7869-5785-9	Stone of Tymora
09/2011	Forgotten Realms	Shadowbane	eBook Novel	Erik Scott de Bie	ISBN 978-0-7869-5855-9	Abyssal Plague
09/2011	Eberron	The Shard Axe	Novel	Marsheila Rockwell		
09/2011	Dragonlance	Dragonlance Legends Trilogy	Novel	Margaret Weis & Tracy Hickman	ISBN 0-7869-5839-1	Legends
10/2011	Forgotten Realms	Cold Steel and Secrets: Part 1	eBook	Rosemary Jones	ISBN 978-0-7869-6233-4	Cold Steel and Secrets
10/2011	Forgotten Realms	Transitions Gift Set	Novel	R.A. Salvatore	ISBN 978-0-7869-5861-0	Transitions
10/2011	Forgotten Realms	Neverwinter	Novel	R.A. Salvatore	ISBN 9780786958429	Neverwinter Saga
11/2011	Forgotten Realms	Cold Steel and Secrets: Part 2	eBook	Rosemary Jones	ISBN 978-0-7869-6234-1	Cold Steel and Secrets
11/2011	Forgotten Realms	Brimstone Angels	Novel	Erin M. Evans	ISBN 978-0-7869-5846-7	Brimstone Angels
12/2011	Forgotten Realms	Ed Greenwood Presents Waterdeep: Book 2	Novel	Ed Greenwood (editor), Rosemary Jones, Erin M. Evans, & James P. Davis	ISBN 978-0-7869-5818-4	Waterdeep (Note: This compilation consists of the second three novels from the Waterdeep series, City of the Dead, The God Catcher, & Circle of Skulls.)
12/2011	Forgotten Realms	Cry of the Ghost Wolf	Novel	Mark Sehestedt	ISBN 978-0-7869-5847-4	Chosen of Nendawen
12/2011	Dark Sun	Death Mark	Novel	Robert J. Schwalb	ISBN 978-0-7869-5840-5	
12/2011	Forgotten Realms	Cold Steel and Secrets: Part 3	eBook	Rosemary Jones	ISBN 978-0-7869-6235-8	Cold Steel and Secrets
01/2012	Forgotten Realms	Cold Steel and Secrets: Part 4	eBook	Rosemary Jones	ISBN 978-0-7869-6236-5	Cold Steel and Secrets
02/2012	Eberron	Infestation 2: Dungeons & Dragons	Graphic novel	Paul Crilley & Valerio Schiti		
02/2012	Forgotten Realms	The Masked Witches	Novel	Richard Lee Byers	ISBN 978-0-7869-5982-2	Brotherhood of the Griffon
03/2012	Forgotten Realms	Venom in Her Veins	Novel	Tim Pratt	ISBN 978-0-7869-5984-6	
04/2012	Points of Light/Nerath	The Eye of the Chained God	Novel	Don Bassingthwaite		Abyssal Plague
04/2012	Forgotten Realms	R.A. Salvatore's War of the Spider Queen: Volume I (Books 1-3)	Novel	R.A. Salvatore editor, Richard Lee Byers, Thomas M. Reid, & Richard Baker	ISBN 978-0-7869-5986-0	War of the Spider Queen (Note: This one book compilation contains the first three novels in the War of the Spider Queen series, Dissolution, Insurrection, & Condemnation.)
05/2012	Forgotten Realms	War of the Spider Queen: Gift Set, Part II (Books 4-6)	Novel	R.A. Salvatore editor, Lisa Smedman, Philip Athans, & Paul S. Kemp	ISBN 978-0-7869-6028-6	War of the Spider Queen (Note: This single volume contains the second three novels in the War of the Spider Queen series, Extinction, Annihilation, & Resurrection.)
05/2012	Forgotten Realms	The Rose of Sarifal	Novel	Paulina Claiborne	ISBN 978-0-7869-3026-5	
06/2012	Forgotten Realms	Sword of the Gods: Spinner of Lies	eBook Novel	Bruce R. Cordell	ISBN 978-0-7869-5995-2	Abyssal Plague
07/2012	Forgotten Realms	The Gilded Rune	Novel	Lisa Smedman	ISBN 978-0-7869-6030-9	
07/2012	Forgotten Realms	Prince of Ravens	Novel	Richard Baker	ISBN 978-0-7869-6131-3	
07/2012	Eberron	Skein of Shadows	Novel	Marsheila Rockwell	ISBN 978-0-7869-6139-9	The Shard Axe
08/2012	Forgotten Realms	Blades of the Moonsea Omnibus	Novel	Richard Baker	ISBN 978-0-7869-6031-6	Blades of the Moonsea
08/2012	Forgotten Realms	Elminster Enraged	Novel	Ed Greenwood	ISBN 978-0-7869-6029-3	The Sage of Shadowdale/The Elminster Series
08/2012	Forgotten Realms	Charon's Claw	Novel	R.A. Salvatore	ISBN 978-0-7869-6362-1	Neverwinter Saga
09/2012	Forgotten Realms	Shadowbane: Eye of Justice	eBook Novel	Erik Scott de Bie	ISBN 978-0-7869-6135-1	Abyssal Plague
09/2012	Forgotten Realms	If Ever They Happened Upon My Lair	eBook Novel	R.A. Salvatore		
11/2012	Forgotten Realms	Spider and Stone	eBook Novel	Jaleigh Johnson		
12/2012	Forgotten Realms	Brimstone Angels: Lesser Evils	Novel	Erin M. Evans	ISBN 978-0-7869-6136-8	Brimstone Angels
02/2013	Forgotten Realms	Prophet of the Dead	Novel	Richard Lee Byers	ISBN 978-0-7869-6361-4	Brotherhood of the Griffon
03/2013	Forgotten Realms	The Last Threshold	Novel	R.A. Salvatore	ISBN 978-0-7869-6364-5	Neverwinter Saga
08/2013	Forgotten Realms	The Companions	Novel	R.A. Salvatore	ISBN 978-0-7869-6371-3	The Sundering
10/2013	Forgotten Realms	The Godborn	Novel	Paul S. Kemp	ISBN 978-0-7869-6373-7	The Sundering
12/2013	Forgotten Realms	The Adversary	Novel	Erin M. Evans	ISBN 978-0-7869-6375-1	The Sundering
01/2014	Forgotten Realms	Night of the Hunter	Novel	R.A. Salvatore	ISBN 978-0-7869-6511-3	Companion Codex
02/2014	Forgotten Realms	The Reaver	Novel	Richard Lee Byers	ISBN 978-0-7869-6458-1	The Sundering
04/2014	Forgotten Realms	The Sentinel	Novel	Troy Denning	ISBN 978-0-7869-6459-8	The Sundering
06/2014	Forgotten Realms	The Herald	Novel	Ed Greenwood	ISBN 978-0-7869-6460-4	The Sundering
09/2014	Forgotten Realms	Rise of the King	Novel	R.A. Salvatore	ISBN 978-0-7869-6515-1	Companion Codex
10/2014	Forgotten Realms	Fire in the Blood	Novel	Erin M. Evans		Brimstone Angels
03/2015	Forgotten Realms	Vengeance of the Iron Dwarf	Novel	R.A. Salvatore		Companion Codex
06/2015	Forgotten Realms	Spellstorm	Novel	Ed Greenwood		Sage of Shadowdale
09/2015	Forgotten Realms	Archmage	Novel	R.A. Salvatore		Homecoming
12/2015	Forgotten Realms	Ashes of the Tyrant	Novel	Erin M. Evans		Brimstone Angels
04/2016	Forgotten Realms	Maestro	Novel	R.A. Salvatore		Homecoming
06/2016	Forgotten Realms	Death Masks	Novel	Ed Greenwood		
10/2016	Forgotten Realms	The Devil You Know	Novel	Erin M. Evans		Brimstone Angels
10/2016	Forgotten Realms	Hero	Novel	R.A. Salvatore		Homecoming
2018	D&D	Escape the Underdark	Endless Quest Book	Matt Forbeck	9781787410510	Endless Quest Book
2018	D&D	Big Trouble	Endless Quest Book	Matt Forbeck	9781783700028	Endless Quest Book
2018	D&D	Into the Jungle	Endless Quest Book	Matt Forbeck	9781787410510	Endless Quest Book
2018	D&D	To Catch a Thief	Endless Quest Book	Matt Forbeck	9781974973026	Endless Quest Book
2019	Ravenloft	Escape from Castle Ravenloft	Endless Quest Book	Matt Forbeck	97819749373163	Endless Quest Book
2019	D&D	The Mad Mage's Academy	Endless Quest Book	Matt Forbeck	9781974973200	Endless Quest Book
09/2018	Forgotten Realms	Timeless	Novel	R.A. Salvatore	ISBN 978-0-0626-8859-0	Generations
09/2019	Forgotten Realms	Boundless	Novel	R.A. Salvatore	ISBN 978-0-0626-8863-7	Generations

== 2020s ==
2020s
Date	Setting	Title	Type	Author(s)	ISBN	Series	Ref.
Released
07/2020	Forgotten Realms	Relentless	Novel	R.A. Salvatore	ISBN 978-0-0626-8867-5	Generations	
08/2021	Forgotten Realms	Starlight Enclave	Novel	R.A. Salvatore	ISBN 978-0-0630-2977-4	The Way of the Drow	
11/2021	Forgotten Realms	Dungeon Academy: No Humans Allowed	Middle grade novel	Madeleine Roux (writer), Tim Probert (artist), HarperCollins Children's Books (publisher)	ISBN 9780063039124	Dungeon Academy	
05/2022	Forgotten Realms	Dungeons & Dragons: A Goblin Problem	Middle grade novel	Diane Walker (writer), Tim Probert (artist), HarperCollins Children's Books (publisher)	ISBN 9780063039186	Dungeon Academy	
08/2022	Dragonlance	Dragons of Deceit	Novel	Margaret Weis, Tracy Hickman	ISBN 9781984819321	Destinies	
08/2022	Forgotten Realms	Glacier's Edge	Novel	R.A. Salvatore	ISBN 978-0-0630-2982-8	The Way of the Drow	
11/2022	Forgotten Realms	Dungeon Academy: Tourney of Terror	Middle grade novel	Madeleine Roux (writer), Tim Probert (artist), HarperCollins Children's Books (publisher)	ISBN 9780063039148	Dungeon Academy	
11/2022	D&D	Dungeon Club: Roll Call	Graphic novel	Lee Knox Ostertag (writer), Xanthe Bouma (artist), HarperCollins Children's Books (publisher)	ISBN 9780063039247	Dungeon Club	
02/2023	Forgotten Realms	The Road to Neverwinter	Novel	Jaleigh Johnson	ISBN 9780593598139	Dungeons & Dragons: Honor Among Thieves Tie-In	
02/2023	Forgotten Realms	The Druid's Call	Novel	E. K. Johnston	ISBN 9780593598160	Dungeons & Dragons: Honor Among Thieves Tie-In	
02/2023	Forgotten Realms	Dungeons & Dragons: Honor Among Thieves	Junior Novelization	David Lewman	ISBN 9780593647950	Dungeons & Dragons: Honor Among Thieves Tie-In	
03/2023	Forgotten Realms	The Feast of the Moon	Graphic Novel	Jeremy Lambert (writer), Ellen Boener (writer), Eduardo Ferigato (illustrator), Guillermo Sanna (Illustrator)	ISBN 9781684059119	Dungeons & Dragons: Honor Among Thieves Tie-In	
08/2023	Dragonlance	Dragons of Fate	Novel	Margaret Weis, Tracy Hickman	ISBN 9781984819383	Destinies	
08/2023	Forgotten Realms	Lolth's Warrior	Novel	R.A. Salvatore	ISBN 978-0-0630-2987-3	The Way of the Drow	
03/2024	Forgotten Realms	The Fallbacks: Bound for Ruin	Novel	Jaleigh Johnson	ISBN 9780593599549	The Fallbacks	
05/2024	Forgotten Realms	Dungeon Academy: Last Best Hope	Middle grade novel	Madeleine Roux (writer), Tim Probert (artist), HarperCollins Children's Books (publisher)	ISBN 9780063039162	Dungeon Academy	
06/2024	Spelljammer	Memory's Wake	Novel	Django Wexler	ISBN 978-0-5937-2321-0	—N/a	
08/2024	Dragonlance	Dragons of Eternity	Novel	Margaret Weis, Tracy Hickman	ISBN 9781984819420	Destinies	
05/2025	Ravenloft	Ravenloft: Heir of Strahd	Novel	Delilah S. Dawson	ISBN 9780593599778	—N/a	
07/2025	Forgotten Realms	The Fallbacks: Dealing with Dragons	Novel	Jaleigh Johnson	ISBN 9780593599570	The Fallbacks	
10/2025	Forgotten Realms	The Finest Edge of Twilight	Novel	R.A. Salvatore	ISBN 9780593875261	—N/a	
06/2026	Feywild	The Feywild Job	Novel	C.L. Polk	ISBN 9780593599792	—N/a	
08/2026	Dragonlance	War Wizard	Novel	Margaret Weis, Tracy Hickman	ISBN 9798217090716		
Upcoming
09/2026	Forgotten Realms	Baldur's Gate 3: Astarion	Novel	T. Kingfisher	ISBN 9798217298594		

== See also ==
Fictional works organized by campaign setting:

- Dark Sun
- Dragonlance
- Eberron
- Forgotten Realms
- Ravenloft
