= List of Forgotten Realms novels =

This is a list of fantasy fiction novels based in the role-playing game setting of the Forgotten Realms.

They are published by Wizards of the Coast (WotC), with some originally published by TSR before it was incorporated into WotC.

== Abolethic Sovereignty ==
By Bruce R. Cordell

- Plague of Spells (paperback, December 2008, ISBN 978-0-7869-4965-6)
- City of Torment (paperback, September 2009, ISBN 978-0-7869-5184-0)
- Key of Stars (paperback, September 2010, ISBN 978-0-7869-5628-9)

== Abyssal Plague ==
By various authors

- The Gates of Madness by James Wyatt
- The Mark of Nerath by Bill Slavicsek (paperback, August 2010, ISBN 978-0-7869-5622-7)
- The Temple of the Yellow Skulls by Don Bassingthwaite (paperback, March 2011, ISBN 978-0-7869-5749-1)
- Oath of Vigilance by James Wyatt (paperback, August 2011, ISBN 978-0-7869-5816-0)
- The Eye of the Chained God by Don Bassingthwaite (paperback, April 2012, ISBN 978-0-7869-5983-9)
- Sword of the Gods by Bruce R. Cordell (paperback, April 2011, ISBN 978-0-7869-5739-2)
- Under the Crimson Sun by Keith R. A. DeCandido (set in Dark Sun) (paperback, June 2011, ISBN 978-0-7869-5797-2)
- Shadowbane (eBook, September 2011, ISBN 978-0-7869-5855-9)

== The Avatar Series ==
By Scott Ciencin (originally using the house name "Richard Awlinson"), Troy Denning, (originally using the house name "Richard Awlinson") and James Lowder

- Shadowdale, by Scott Ciencin (paperback, April 1989, under the name "Richard Awlinson", ISBN 978-0-88038-730-9; paperback re-issue, May 2003, ISBN 978-0-7869-3105-7)
- Tantras, by Scott Ciencin (paperback, June 1989, under the name "Richard Awlinson"; ISBN 978-0-88038-748-4; paperback re-issue, June 2003, ISBN 978-0-7869-3108-8)
- Waterdeep, by Troy Denning (paperback, August 1989, under the name "Richard Awlinson"; ISBN 978-0-88038-759-0; paperback re-issue, July 2003, ISBN 978-0-7869-3111-8)
- Prince of Lies, by James Lowder (paperback, August 1993, ISBN 978-1-56076-626-1; paperback re-issue, September 2003, ISBN 978-0-7869-3114-9)
- Crucible: The Trial of Cyric the Mad, by Troy Denning (paperback, February 1998, ISBN 978-0-7869-0724-3; paperback re-issue, November 2003, ISBN 978-0-7869-3117-0)

== The Baldur's Gate Series ==
Based on the Baldur's Gate computer game series.

- Baldur's Gate by Philip Athans (paperback, July 1999, ISBN 978-0-7869-1525-5)
- Baldur's Gate II: The Shadows of Amn by Philip Athans (paperback, September 2000, ISBN 978-0-7869-1569-9)
- Baldur's Gate II: Throne of Bhaal by Drew Karpyshyn (paperback, September 2001, ISBN 978-0-7869-1985-7)
- Baldur's Gate 3: Astarion by T. Kingfisher (September 2026, ISBN 9798217298594)

== Blades of the Moonsea ==
By Richard Baker

- The Swordmage (hardcover, May 2008, ISBN 978-0-7869-4788-1; paperback, December 2008, ISBN 978-0-7869-5022-5)
- Corsair (hardcover, March 2009, ISBN 978-0-7869-5115-4; paperback, November 2009, ISBN 978-0-7869-5307-3)
- Avenger (hardcover, March 2010, ISBN 978-0-7869-5393-6; paperback, November 2010, ISBN 978-0-7869-5575-6)

Blades of the Moonsea was intended to be released in omnibus form but was ultimately cancelled by Wizards of the Coast:

- Blades of the Moonsea Omnibus (paperback, August 2012, ISBN 978-0-7869-6031-6)

== Brimstone Angels ==
By Erin M. Evans

- Brimstone Angels (paperback, November 2011, ISBN 978-0-7869-5846-7)
- Brimstone Angels: Lesser Evils (paperback/eBook December 2012. ISBN 978-0-7869-6136-8)
- The Adversary, by Erin M. Evans (hardcover, December 2013, ISBN 978-0-7869-6375-1; paperback, May 2014, ISBN 978-0-7869-6536-6) (this is also part of The Sundering series, listed below)
- Brimstone Angels: Fire In The Blood (hardcover/paperback/eBook October 2014, ISBN 978-0-7869-6529-8)
- Brimstone Angels: Ashes Of The Tyrant (hardcover/paperback/eBook December 2015, ISBN 978-0-7869-6573-1)
- Brimstone Angels: The Devil You Know (hardcover/eBook/ October 2016, ISBN 978-0-7869-6594-6; paperback, September 2017, ISBN 978-0-7869-6617-2)

== Brotherhood of the Griffon ==
By Richard Lee Byers

- The Captive Flame (paperback, May 2010, ISBN 978-0-7869-5396-7)
- Whisper of Venom (paperback, November 2010, ISBN 978-0-7869-5561-9)
- The Spectral Blaze (paperback, June 2011, ISBN 978-0-7869-5798-9)
- The Masked Witches (paperback, February 2012, ISBN 978-0-7869-5982-2)
- Prophet of the Dead (paperback/eBook/audio book), February 2013, ISBN 978-0-7869-6361-4

== Chosen of Nendawen ==
By Mark Sehestedt

- The Fall of Highwatch (paperback, November 2009, ISBN 978-0-7869-5143-7)
- The Hand of the Hunter (paperback, December 2010, ISBN 978-0-7869-5627-2)
- Cry of the Ghost Wolf (paperback, December 2011, ISBN 978-0-7869-5847-4)

== The Citadels ==
By Ed Gentry, Jess Lebow, James P. Davis and Mark Sehestedt

- Neversfall, by Ed Gentry (paperback, November 2007, ISBN 978-0-7869-4782-9)
- Obsidian Ridge, by Jess Lebow (paperback, April 2008, ISBN 978-0-7869-4785-0)
- The Shield of Weeping Ghosts, by James P. Davis (paperback, May 2008, ISBN 978-0-7869-4877-2)
- Sentinelspire, by Mark Sehestedt (paperback, July 2008, ISBN 978-0-7869-4937-3)

== The Cities ==
By Richard Baker, Drew Karpyshyn, Mel Odom, Ed Greenwood, and Elaine Cunningham

- The City of Ravens, by Richard Baker (paperback, December 2000, ISBN 978-0-7869-1401-2)
- Temple Hill, by Drew Karpyshyn (paperback, September 2001, ISBN 978-0-7869-1871-3)
- The Jewel of Turmish, by Mel Odom (paperback, February 2002, ISBN 978-0-7869-2698-5)
- The City of Splendors: A Waterdeep Novel, by Ed Greenwood and Elaine Cunningham (hardcover, August 2005, ISBN 978-0-7869-3766-0; paperback, May 2006, ISBN 978-0-7869-4004-2)

== The Cleric Quintet ==
By R. A. Salvatore

- Canticle (paperback, October 1991, ISBN 978-1-56076-119-8; paperback reissue, February 2000, ISBN 978-0-7869-1604-7; paperback reissue, March 2009, ISBN 978-0-7869-5325-7)
- In Sylvan Shadows (paperback, April 1992, ISBN 978-1-56076-321-5; paperback reissue, March 2000, ISBN 978-0-7869-1605-4; paperback reissue, March 2009, ISBN 978-0-7869-5326-4)
- Night Masks (paperback, August 1992, ISBN 978-1-56076-328-4; paperback reissue, May 2000, ISBN 978-0-7869-1606-1; paperback reissue, May 2009, ISBN 978-0-7869-5327-1)
- The Fallen Fortress (paperback, June 1993, ISBN 978-1-56076-419-9; paperback reissue, July 2000, ISBN 978-0-7869-1607-8; paperback reissue, August 2009, ISBN 978-0-7869-5328-8)
- The Chaos Curse (paperback, June 1994, ISBN 978-1-56076-860-9; paperback reissue, July 2000, ISBN 978-0-7869-1608-5; paperback reissue, September 2009, ISBN 978-0-7869-5329-5)

The Cleric Quintet was later reprinted in:

- The Cleric Quintet Collector's Edition (hardcover, January 1999, ISBN 978-0-7869-1313-8; paperback, January 2002, ISBN 978-0-7869-2690-9)

== Cold Steel And Secrets ==
Cold Steel and Secrets, by Rosemary Jones

- Part 1 (Ebook, October 2011, ISBN 978-0-7869-6233-4)
- Part 2 (Ebook, November 2011, ISBN 978-0-7869-6234-1)
- Part 3 (Ebook, December 2011, ISBN 978-0-7869-6235-8)
- Part 4 (Ebook, January 2012, ISBN 978-0-7869-6236-5)

== Companions Codex ==
By R. A. Salvatore

- Night of the Hunter (hardcover/eBook, March 2014, ISBN 978-0-7869-6511-3; paperback, September 2014, ISBN 978-0-7869-6517-5)
- Rise of the King (hardcover/eBook, September 2014, ISBN 978-0-7869-6515-1; paperback, February 2015, ISBN 978-0-7869-6568-7)
- Vengeance of the Iron Dwarf (hardcover/eBook, March 2015, ISBN 978-0-7869-6570-0; paperback, August 2015, ISBN 978-0-7869-6572-4)

== The Cormyr Saga ==
By Ed Greenwood, Jeff Grubb, and Troy Denning

- Cormyr: A Novel, by Ed Greenwood and Jeff Grubb (hardcover, July 1996, ISBN 978-0-7869-0503-4; paperback, April 1998, ISBN 978-0-7869-0710-6)
- Beyond the High Road, by Troy Denning (paperback, December 1999, ISBN 978-0-7869-1436-4)
- Death of the Dragon, by Ed Greenwood and Troy Denning (hardcover, August 2000, ISBN 978-0-7869-1637-5; paperback, May 2001, ISBN 978-0-7869-1863-8)

== Counselors & Kings ==
By Elaine Cunningham

- The Magehound (hardcover, March 2000, ISBN 978-0-7394-1237-4; paperback, April 2000, ISBN 978-0-7869-1561-3)
- The Floodgate (paperback, April 2001, ISBN 978-0-7869-1818-8)
- The Wizardwar (paperback, March 2002, ISBN 978-0-7869-2704-3)

== Double Diamond Triangle Saga ==
By J. Robert King, James M. Ward & David Wise, Ed Greenwood, Roger E. Moore, Dave Gross, David Cook & Peter Archer, and Richard Baker

- The Abduction, by J. Robert King (paperback, February 1998, ISBN 978-0-7869-0864-6)
- The Paladins, by James M. Ward and David Wise (paperback, February 1998, ISBN 978-0-7869-0865-3)
- The Mercenaries, by Ed Greenwood (paperback, February 1998, ISBN 978-0-7869-0866-0)
- Errand of Mercy, by Roger E. Moore (paperback, February 1998, ISBN 978-0-7869-0867-7)
- An Opportunity for Profit, by Dave Gross (paperback, March 1998, ISBN 978-0-7869-0868-4)
- Conspiracy, by J. Robert King (paperback, April 1998, ISBN 978-0-7869-0869-1)
- Uneasy Alliances, by David Cook with Peter Archer (paperback, May 1998, ISBN 978-0-7869-0870-7)
- Easy Betrayals, by Richard Baker (paperback, June 1998, ISBN 978-0-7869-0871-4)
- The Diamond, by J. Robert King and Ed Greenwood (paperback, July 1998, ISBN 978-0-7869-0872-1)

== The Druidhome Trilogy ==
By Douglas Niles

- Prophet of Moonshae (paperback, February 1992, ISBN 978-1-56076-319-2)
- The Coral Kingdom (paperback, September 1992, ISBN 978-1-56076-332-1)
- The Druid Queen (paperback, February 1993, ISBN 978-1-56076-568-4)

== The Dungeons ==
By Erik Scott de Bie, Jaleigh Johnson, Bruce R. Cordell and Rosemary Jones

- Depths of Madness, by Erik Scott de Bie (paperback, March 2007, ISBN 978-0-7869-4314-2)
- The Howling Delve, by Jaleigh Johnson (paperback, July 2007, ISBN 978-0-7869-4278-7)
- Stardeep, by Bruce R. Cordell (paperback, October 2007, ISBN 978-0-7869-4338-8)
- Crypt of the Moaning Diamond, by Rosemary Jones (paperback, November 2007, ISBN 978-0-7869-4714-0)

== Dungeons & Dragons: Honor Among Thieves ==
By E.K. Johnston, Jaleigh Johnson and David Lewman. Tie-in novels of the 2023 film Dungeons & Dragons: Honor Among Thieves.

- The Druid's Call, by E.K. Johnston (hardcover & ebook, February 2023, ISBN 978-0593598160)
- The Road To Neverwinter, by Jaleigh Johnson (hardcover & ebook, February 2023, ISBN 978-0593598139)
- Dungeons & Dragons: Honor Among Thieves: The Deluxe Junior Novelization, by David Lewman (hardcover & ebook, February 2023, ISBN 978-0593647974)

== The Elminster Series ==
By Ed Greenwood (featuring Elminster)

- Elminster - The Making of a Mage (hardcover, December 1994, ISBN 978-1-56076-936-1; paperback, December 1995, ISBN 978-0-7869-0203-3)
- Elminster in Myth Drannor (hardcover, November 1997, ISBN 978-0-7869-0661-1; paperback, December 1998, ISBN 978-0-7869-1190-5)
- The Temptation of Elminster (hardcover, December 1998, ISBN 978-0-7869-1189-9; paperback, November 1999, ISBN 978-0-7869-1427-2)
- Elminster in Hell (hardcover, August 2001, ISBN 978-0-7869-1875-1; paperback, May 2002, ISBN 978-0-7869-2746-3)
- Elminster's Daughter (hardcover, May 2004, ISBN 978-0-7869-3199-6; paperback, June 2005, ISBN 978-0-7869-3768-4)

The first three volumes in this series were reprinted twice, the first with extensive new commentary by Ed Greenwood and the second as an omnibus in:

- The Annotated Elminster (hardcover, November 2007, ISBN 978-0-7869-4799-7)
- Elminster Ascending (paperback, November 2010, ISBN 978-0-7869-5618-0)

The Saga continues in the series: The Sage of Shadowdale

- Elminster Must Die (hardcover, August 2010, ISBN 978-0-7869-5193-2; paperback, June 2011, ISBN 978-0-7869-5799-6)
- Bury Elminster Deep (hardcover, August 2011, ISBN 978-0-7869-5815-3; paperback, June 2012, ISBN 978-0-7869-6024-8)
- Elminster Enraged (hardcover, August 2012, ISBN 978-0-7869-6029-3; paperback, May 2013, ISBN 978-0-7869-6363-8)

== The Empires Trilogy ==
By David Cook, Troy Denning and James Lowder

- Horselords, by David Cook (paperback, May 1990, ISBN 978-0-88038-904-4)
- Dragonwall, by Troy Denning (paperback, August 1990, ISBN 978-0-88038-919-8)
- Crusade, by James Lowder (paperback, January 1991, ISBN 978-0-88038-908-2)

== The Empyrean Odyssey ==
By Thomas M. Reid

- The Gossamer Plain (paperback, May 2007, ISBN 978-0-7869-4024-0)
- The Fractured Sky (paperback, November 2008, ISBN 978-0-7869-4807-9)
- The Crystal Mountain (paperback, July 2009, ISBN 978-0-7869-5235-9)

The Empyrean Odyssey Trilogy was later reprinted as an omnibus in:

- The Empyrean Odyssey: A Forgotten Realms Omnibus (paperback, March 2011, ISBN 978-0-7869-5768-2)

== The Erevis Cale Trilogy ==
By Paul S. Kemp

- Twilight Falling (paperback, July 2003, ISBN 978-0-7869-2998-6)
- Dawn of Night (paperback, June 2004, ISBN 978-0-7869-3225-2)
- Midnight's Mask (paperback, November 2005, ISBN 978-0-7869-3643-4)

The Erevis Cale Trilogy was later reprinted as an omnibus in:

- The Erevis Cale Trilogy (paperback, June 2010, ISBN 978-0-7869-5498-8)

== The Fallbacks ==
By Jaleigh Johnson

- The Fallbacks: Bound for Ruin (hardcover, March 2024, ISBN 9780593599549, paperback September 2024, ISBN 9780593599563)
- The Fallbacks: Dealing with Dragons (hardcover, July 2025, ISBN 9780593599570)

== The Fighters ==
By Jess Lebow, Erik Scott de Bie, Murray J. D. Leeder and Keith Francis Strohm

- Master of Chains, by Jess Lebow (paperback, September 2005, ISBN 978-0-7869-3800-1)
- Ghostwalker, by Erik Scott de Bie (paperback, December 2005, ISBN 978-0-7869-3962-6)
- Son of Thunder, by Murray J. D. Leeder (paperback, January 2006, ISBN 978-0-7869-3960-2)
- Bladesinger, by Keith Francis Strohm (paperback, April 2006, ISBN 978-0-7869-3835-3)

== The Finder's Stone Trilogy ==
By Kate Novak and Jeff Grubb

- Azure Bonds, by Kate Novak and Jeff Grubb (paperback, October 1988, ISBN 978-0-88038-612-8)
- The Wyvern's Spur, by Kate Novak and Jeff Grubb (paperback, March 1990, ISBN 978-0-88038-902-0)
- Song of the Saurials, by Kate Novak and Jeff Grubb (paperback, March 1991, ISBN 978-1-56076-060-3)

== The Harpers ==
By Troy Denning, Elaine Cunningham, Jean Rabe, Scott Ciencin, James Lowder, Mark Anthony, David Cook, Charles Alexander Moffat, Ed Greenwood, and Kate Novak & Jeff Grubb.

- The Parched Sea, by Troy Denning (paperback, July 1991, ISBN 978-1-56076-067-2)
- Elfshadow, by Elaine Cunningham (paperback, October 1991, ISBN 978-1-56076-117-4; later re-issued as Songs & Swords 1)
- Red Magic, by Jean Rabe (paperback, December 1991, ISBN 978-1-56076-118-1)
- The Night Parade, by Scott Ciencin (paperback, June 1992, ISBN 978-1-56076-323-9)
- The Ring of Winter, by James Lowder (paperback, November 1992, ISBN 978-1-56076-330-7)
- Crypt of the Shadowking, by Mark Anthony (paperback, March 1993, ISBN 978-1-56076-594-3)
- Soldiers of Ice, by David Cook (paperback, November 1993, ISBN 978-1-56076-641-4)
- Elfsong, by Elaine Cunningham (paperback, January 1994, ISBN 978-1-56076-679-7; later re-issued as Songs & Swords 2)
- Crown of Fire, by Ed Greenwood (paperback, April 1994, ISBN 978-1-56076-839-5; later re-issued as Shandril's Saga 2)
- Masquerades, by Kate Novak and Jeff Grubb (paperback, July 1995, ISBN 978-0-7869-0152-4)
- Curse of the Shadowmage, by Mark Anthony (paperback, November 1995, ISBN 978-0-7869-0191-3)
- The Veiled Dragon, by Troy Denning (paperback, April 1996, ISBN 978-0-7869-0482-2)
- Silver Shadows, by Elaine Cunningham (paperback, June 1996, ISBN 978-0-7869-0498-3; later re-issued as Songs & Swords 3)
- Stormlight, by Ed Greenwood (paperback, October 1996, ISBN 978-0-7869-0520-1)
- Finder's Bane, by Kate Novak and Jeff Grubb (paperback, July 1997, ISBN 978-0-7869-0658-1; this book is also the first novel in the Lost Gods series)
- Thornhold, by Elaine Cunningham (paperback, August 1998, ISBN 978-0-7869-1177-6; later re-issued as Songs & Swords 4)

== The Haunted Lands ==
This series contains a trilogy of novels written by Richard Lee Byers, as well as an anthology of short stories written by various authors.

- Unclean (paperback, April 2007, ISBN 978-0-7869-4258-9)
- Undead (paperback, April 2008, ISBN 978-0-7869-4783-6)
- Unholy (paperback, March 2009, ISBN 978-0-7869-5021-8)
- Realms of the Dead, edited by Susan J. Morris (paperback, January 2010 ISBN 978-0-7869-5363-9) (this book is also listed under the Anthologies section, below)
  - "A Body in a Bag", by Erik Scott de Bie
  - "A Prayer for Brother Robert", by Philip Athans
  - "Dusty Bones", by Rosemary Jones
  - "Feast of the Moon", by Christopher Rowe
  - "Iruladoon", by R. A. Salvatore
  - "Pieces", by Richard Lee Byers
  - "Soul Steel", by Lisa Smedman
  - "The Bone Bird", by Jaleigh Johnson
  - "The King in Copper", by Richard Baker
  - "The Many Murders of Manshoon", by Ed Greenwood
  - "The Resurrection Agent", by Erin M. Evans
  - "Wandering Stones", by Bruce R. Cordell

== Homecoming ==
By R. A. Salvatore

- Archmage (hardcover, September 2015, ISBN 978-0-7869-6585-4, paperback, February 2017, ISBN 978-0-7869-6613-4)
- Maestro (hardcover, April 2016, ISBN 978-0-7869-6591-5, paperback, June 2017, ISBN 978-0-7869-6614-1)
- Hero (hardcover/eBook, October 2016, ISBN 978-0-7869-6596-0, paperback, October 2017, ISBN 978-0-7869-6615-8)

== House of Serpents ==
By Lisa Smedman

- Venom's Taste (paperback, March 2004, ISBN 978-0-7869-3166-8)
- Viper's Kiss (paperback, March 2005, ISBN 978-0-7869-3616-8)
- Vanity's Brood (paperback, March 2006, ISBN 978-0-7869-3982-4)

The House of Serpents trilogy was later reprinted as an omnibus in:

- House of Serpents (paperback, October 2009, ISBN 978-0-7869-5364-6)

== The Knights of Myth Drannor ==
By Ed Greenwood

- Swords of Eveningstar (hardcover, August 2006, ISBN 978-0-7869-4022-6; paperback, June 2007, ISBN 978-0-7869-4272-5)
- Swords of Dragonfire (hardcover, August 2007, ISBN 978-0-7869-4339-5; paperback, April 2008, ISBN 978-0-7869-4862-8)
- The Sword Never Sleeps (hardcover, November 2008, ISBN 978-0-7869-4914-4; paperback, May 2009, ISBN 978-0-7869-5015-7)

== The Lady Penitent ==
By Lisa Smedman

- Sacrifice of the Widow (paperback, February 2007, ISBN 978-0-7869-4250-3)
- Storm of the Dead (paperback, August 2007, ISBN 978-0-7869-4701-0)
- Ascendancy of the Last (paperback, June 2008, ISBN 978-0-7869-4864-2)

== The Last Mythal ==
This series contains a trilogy of novels written by Richard Baker, as well as an anthology of short stories written by various authors.

- Forsaken House, by Richard Baker (paperback, August 2004, ISBN 978-0-7869-3260-3)
- Farthest Reach, by Richard Baker (paperback, July 2005, ISBN 978-0-7869-3756-1)
- Final Gate, by Richard Baker (paperback, June 2006, ISBN 978-0-7869-4002-8)
- Realms of the Elves, edited by Philip Athans (paperback, February 2006, ISBN 978-0-7869-3980-0) (this book is also listed under the Anthologies section, above)
  - "Traitors", by Richard Lee Byers
  - "The Staff of Valmaxian", by Philip Athans
  - "Necessary Sacrifices", by Lisa Smedman
  - "The Greater Treasure", by Erik Scott de Bie
  - "Comrades at Odds", by R. A. Salvatore
  - "Tears so White", by Ed Greenwood
  - "The Bladesinger's Lesson", by Richard Baker

The three volume trilogy by Richard Baker was later reprinted in two formats:

- The Last Mythal Gift Set (three paperbacks in boxed slipcase, September 2007, ISBN 978-0-7869-4712-6)
- The Last Mythal: A Forgotten Realms Omnibus (ebook, August 2011, ISBN 978-0-7869-5813-9)

== The Legend of Drizzt ==
By R. A. Salvatore (featuring Drizzt Do'Urden)

This series consists of re-issues of novels (with new cover art) that had previously been published under different series titles.

=== The Icewind Dale Trilogy ===
- The Crystal Shard (paperback, January 1988, ISBN 978-0-88038-535-0)
- Streams of Silver (paperback, January 1989, ISBN 978-0-88038-672-2)
- The Halfling's Gem (paperback, January 1990, ISBN 978-0-88038-901-3)

The Crystal Shard was the second Forgotten Realms novel ever published, and the first by R. A. Salvatore.

The Icewind Dale Trilogy was later reprinted in several different formats:

- The Icewind Dale Trilogy Collector's Edition (hardcover, January 2000, ISBN 978-0-7869-1557-6; paperback, February 2001, ISBN 978-0-7869-1811-9)
- The Icewind Dale Trilogy Gift Set (three paperbacks in boxed slipcase, September 2002, ISBN 978-0-7869-2720-3)
- Volumes 4-6 in The Legend of Drizzt
- The Legend of Drizzt Collector's Edition, Book II (hardcover, March 2008, ISBN 978-0-7869-4838-3; paperback, May 2010, ISBN 978-0-7869-5487-2)

=== The Dark Elf Trilogy ===
- Homeland (paperback, August 1990, ISBN 978-0-88038-905-1)
- Exile (paperback, December 1990, ISBN 978-0-88038-920-4)
- Sojourn (paperback, May 1991, ISBN 978-1-56076-047-4)

The Dark Elf Trilogy was later reprinted in several different formats:

- The Dark Elf Trilogy Collector's Edition (hardcover, July 1998, ISBN 978-0-7869-1176-9; paperback, February 2000, ISBN 978-0-7869-1588-0)
- The Dark Elf Trilogy Gift Set (three paperbacks in boxed slipcase, September 2001, ISBN 978-0-7869-2683-1)
- Volumes 1-3 in The Legend of Drizzt
- The Legend of Drizzt Collector's Edition, Book I (hardcover, February 2008, ISBN 978-0-7869-4837-6; paperback, January 2010, ISBN 978-0-7869-5370-7)

=== Legacy of the Drow ===
- The Legacy (hardcover, September 1992, ISBN 978-1-56076-529-5; paperback, October 1993, ISBN 978-1-56076-640-7; hardcover re-issue, January 1996, ISBN 978-0-517-16626-0)
- Starless Night (hardcover, August 1993, ISBN 978-1-56076-653-7; paperback, August 1994, ISBN 978-1-56076-880-7; hardcover re-issue, February 1996, ISBN 978-0-517-16628-4)
- Siege of Darkness (hardcover, August 1994, ISBN 978-1-56076-888-3; paperback, August 1995, ISBN 978-0-7869-0164-7)
- Passage to Dawn (hardcover, August 1996, ISBN 978-0-7869-0489-1; hardcover, September 1996, ISBN 978-0-7869-0834-9; paperback, August 1997, ISBN 978-0-7869-0750-2)

The Legacy was the first Forgotten Realms novel published in hardcover.

Legacy of the Drow was later reprinted in several different formats:

- Legacy of the Drow Collector's Edition (hardcover, January 2001, ISBN 978-0-7869-1800-3; paperback, January 2003, ISBN 978-0-7869-2908-5)
- Legacy of the Drow Gift Set (four paperbacks in boxed slipcase, September 2003, ISBN 978-0-7869-3001-2)
- Volumes 7-10 in The Legend of Drizzt
- The Legend of Drizzt Collector's Edition, Book III (hardcover, January 2009, ISBN 978-0-7869-5004-1; paperback, September 2010, ISBN 978-0-7869-5573-2)

=== Paths of Darkness ===
- The Silent Blade (hardcover, October 1998, ISBN 978-0-7869-1180-6; paperback, June 1999, ISBN 978-0-7869-1388-6)
- The Spine of the World (hardcover, September 1999, ISBN 978-0-7869-1418-0; paperback, July 2000, ISBN 978-0-7869-1404-3)
- Servant of the Shard (hardcover, October 2000, ISBN 978-0-7869-1657-3; paperback, July 2001, ISBN 978-0-7869-1878-2; later re-issued as the first volume in the Sellswords series)
- Sea of Swords (hardcover, October 2001, ISBN 978-0-7869-1898-0; paperback, August 2002, ISBN 978-0-7869-2772-2)

Paths of Darkness was later reprinted in several different formats:

- Paths of Darkness Collector's Edition (hardcover, February 2004, ISBN 978-0-7869-3155-2; paperback, August 2005, ISBN 978-0-7869-3995-4)
- Paths of Darkness Gift Set (four paperbacks in boxed slipcase, August 2004, ISBN 978-0-7869-3349-5)
- Volumes 11-13 in The Legend of Drizzt
- The Legend of Drizzt Collector's Edition, Book IV (hardcover, September 2010, ISBN 978-0-7869-5395-0; paperback announced for May 2011, ISBN 978-0-7869-5741-5)

=== The Hunter's Blades Trilogy ===
- The Thousand Orcs (hardcover, October 2002, ISBN 978-0-7869-2804-0; paperback, July 2003, ISBN 978-0-7869-2980-1)
- The Lone Drow (hardcover, October 2003, ISBN 978-0-7869-3012-8; paperback, June 2004, ISBN 978-0-7869-3228-3)
- The Two Swords (hardcover, October 2004, ISBN 978-0-7869-3360-0; paperback, September 2005, ISBN 978-0-7869-3790-5)

The Hunter's Blades Trilogy was later reprinted in several different formats:

- The Hunter's Blades Collector's Edition (hardcover, January 2007, ISBN 978-0-7869-4315-9)
- The Hunter's Blades Trilogy Gift Set (three paperbacks in boxed slipcase, August 2007, ISBN 978-0-7869-4727-0)
- Volumes 14-16 in The Legend of Drizzt

=== Anthology ===
- The Collected Stories: The Legend of Drizzt, edited by Philip Athans (paperback, February 2011, ISBN 978-0-7869-5738-5) (this anthology is part of The Legend of Drizzt series, listed below)
  - 'The First Notch'
  - 'Dark Mirror'
  - 'The Third Level'
  - 'Guenhwyvar'
  - 'That Curious Sword'
  - 'Wickless In The Nether'
  - 'The Dowery'
  - 'Comrades At Odds'
  - 'If They Ever Happened Upon My Lair'
  - 'Bones And Stones'
  - 'Iruladoon'
  - 'To Legend He Goes'

== Lost Empires ==
By Mel Odom, Troy Denning, Clayton Emery, and Lynn Abbey

- The Lost Library of Cormanthyr, by Mel Odom (paperback, March 1998, ISBN 978-0-7869-0735-9)
- Faces of Deception, by Troy Denning (paperback, November 1998, ISBN 978-0-7869-1183-7)
- Star of Cursrah, by Clayton Emery (paperback, February 1999, ISBN 978-0-7869-1322-0)
- The Nether Scroll, by Lynn Abbey (paperback, September 2000, ISBN 978-0-7869-1566-8)

== The Lost Gods ==
By Kate Novak, Jeff Grubb, and Douglas Niles

This series is a cross-over between the Forgotten Realms and Dragonlance settings.

- Finder's Bane, by Kate Novak and Jeff Grubb (paperback, July 1997, ISBN 978-0-7869-0658-1; this book is also the 15th novel in the Harpers series)
- Fistandantilus Reborn, by Douglas Niles (paperback, July 1997, ISBN 978-0-7869-0708-3; this book is also the 2nd novel in the Dragonlance Lost Legends series)
- Tymora's Luck, by Kate Novak and Jeff Grubb (paperback, December 1997, ISBN 978-0-7869-0726-7)

== The Maztica Trilogy ==
By Douglas Niles

- Ironhelm (paperback, April 1990, ISBN 978-0-88038-903-7)
- Viperhand (paperback, October 1990, ISBN 978-0-88038-907-5)
- Feathered Dragon (paperback, April 1991, ISBN 978-1-56076-045-0)

== The Moonshae Trilogy ==
By Douglas Niles

- Darkwalker on Moonshae (paperback, May 1987, ISBN 978-0-88038-451-3; paperback re-issue, October 2004, ISBN 978-0-7869-3560-4)
- Black Wizards (paperback, April 1988, ISBN 978-0-88038-563-3; paperback re-issue, November 2004, ISBN 978-0-7869-3563-5)
- Darkwell (paperback, February 1989, ISBN 978-0-88038-717-0; paperback re-issue, December 2004, ISBN 978-0-7869-3566-6)

Darkwalker on Moonshae was the very first Forgotten Realms novel ever published.

== Mysteries ==
By Chet Williamson, John Maddox Roberts, and Richard Meyers

- Murder in Cormyr, by Chet Williamson (hardcover, March 1996, ISBN 978-0-7869-0486-0; paperback, July 1998, ISBN 978-0-7869-1173-8)
- Murder in Tarsis by John Maddox Roberts (FR tie-in Dragonlance hardcover, June 1996, ISBN 0-7869-0500-X or ISBN 978-0-7869-0500-3, USA Version)
- Murder in Halruaa, by Richard Meyers (hardcover, October 1996, ISBN 978-0-7869-0521-8)

== Netheril Trilogy ==
By Clayton Emery

- Sword Play (paperback, May 1996, ISBN 978-0-7869-0492-1)
- Dangerous Games (paperback, November 1996, ISBN 978-0-7869-0524-9)
- Mortal Consequences (paperback, January 1998, ISBN 978-0-7869-0683-3)

== Neverwinter Saga ==
By R. A. Salvatore

- Gauntlgrym (hardcover, October 2010, ISBN 978-0-7869-5500-8; paperback, July 2011, ISBN 978-0-7869-5802-3)
- Neverwinter (hardcover, October 2011, ISBN 978-0-7869-5842-9; paperback, July 2012, ISBN 978-0-7869-6027-9)
- Charon's Claw (hardcover, August 2012, ISBN 978-0-7869-6223-5; eBook, August 2012, ISBN 978-0-7869-6362-1; paperback, February 2013, ISBN 978-0-7869-6362-1)
- The Last Threshold (hardcover/audio book/eBook, March 2013, ISBN 978-0-7869-6364-5)

== The Nobles ==
By David Cook, Victor Milán, Mark Anthony, Brian Thomsen, Paul Kidd, and Lynn Abbey

- King Pinch, by David Cook (paperback, May 1995, ISBN 978-0-7869-0127-2)
- War in Tethyr, by Victor Milán (paperback, October 1995, ISBN 978-0-7869-0184-5)
- Escape from Undermountain, by Mark Anthony (paperback, February 1996, ISBN 978-0-7869-0477-8)
- The Mage in the Iron Mask, by Brian Thomsen (paperback, August 1996, ISBN 978-0-7869-0506-5)
- The Council of Blades, by Paul Kidd (paperback, November 1997, ISBN 978-0-7869-0531-7)
- The Simbul's Gift, by Lynn Abbey (paperback, November 1997, ISBN 978-0-7869-0763-2)

== The Pools ==
By James M. Ward. Set mostly in the city of Phlan. Also called the "Heroes of Phlan Trilogy"

- Pool of Radiance, by James M. Ward and Jane Cooper Hong (paperback, December 1989, ISBN 978-0-88038-735-4)
- Pools of Darkness, by James M. Ward and Anne K. Brown (paperback, February 1992, ISBN 978-1-56076-318-5)
- Pool of Twilight, by James M. Ward and Anne K. Brown (paperback, October 1993, ISBN 978-1-56076-582-0)

== The Priests ==
By Bruce R. Cordell, Dave Gross & Don Bassingthwaite, Kameron M. Franklin (winner of the WotC Open Call), and Richard Lee Byers

- Lady of Poison, by Bruce R. Cordell (paperback, July 2004, ISBN 978-0-7869-3161-3)
- Mistress of the Night, by Dave Gross and Don Bassingthwaite (paperback, December 2004, ISBN 978-0-7869-3346-4)
- Maiden of Pain, by Kameron M. Franklin (paperback, June 2005, ISBN 978-0-7869-3764-6) (subject of the 2003 novel Open Call) (Franklin was chosen from more than 500 writers to author a Forgotten Realms novel.)
- Queen of the Depths, by Richard Lee Byers (paperback, September 2005, ISBN 978-0-7869-3737-0)

== Return of the Archwizards ==
This series contains a trilogy of novels written by Troy Denning, as well as an anthology of short stories written by various authors.

- The Summoning, by Troy Denning (paperback, March 2001, ISBN 978-0-7869-1801-0)
- The Siege, by Troy Denning (paperback, December 2001, ISBN 978-0-7869-1905-5)
- The Sorcerer, by Troy Denning (paperback, November 2002, ISBN 978-0-7869-2795-1)
- Realms of Shadow, edited by Lizz Baldwin (paperback, April 2002, ISBN 978-0-7869-2716-6) (this book is also listed under the Anthologies section, above)
  - "Trial by Ordeal", by Lisa Smedman
  - "Assassin's Shadow", by Jess Lebow
  - "Too Long in the Dark", by Paul S. Kemp
  - "Darksword", by Troy Denning
  - "Liar's Game", by Jessica Beaven
  - "That Curious Sword", by R. A. Salvatore
  - "A Little Knowledge", by Elaine Cunningham
  - "Astride the Wind", by Philip Athans
  - "The Fallen Lands", by Murray J. D. Leeder
  - "When Shadows Come Seeking a Throne", by Ed Greenwood
  - "King Shadow", by Richard Lee Byers
  - "The Shifting Sands", by Peter Archer

The Return of the Archwizards trilogy was later reprinted as an omnibus in:

- Return of the Archwizards (paperback, December 2009, ISBN 978-0-7869-5365-3)

== The Rogues ==
By Edward Bolme, Richard Lee Byers, Voronica Whitney-Robinson, and Don Bassingthwaite

- The Alabaster Staff, by Edward Bolme (paperback, July 2003, ISBN 978-0-7869-2962-7)
- The Black Bouquet, by Richard Lee Byers (paperback, September 2003, ISBN 978-0-7869-3042-5)
- The Crimson Gold, by Voronica Whitney-Robinson (paperback, December 2003, ISBN 978-0-7869-3120-0)
- The Yellow Silk, by Don Bassingthwaite (paperback, February 2004, ISBN 978-0-7869-3152-1)

== The Scions of Arrabar Trilogy ==
By Thomas M. Reid

- The Sapphire Crescent (paperback, November 2003, ISBN 978-0-7869-3027-2)
- The Ruby Guardian (paperback, November 2004, ISBN 978-0-7869-3382-2)
- The Emerald Scepter (paperback, August 2005, ISBN 978-0-7869-3754-7)

== The Sellswords ==
By R. A. Salvatore (featuring Artemis Entreri)

- Servant of the Shard (hardcover, October 2000, ISBN 978-0-7869-1657-3; paperback, July 2001, ISBN 978-0-7869-2622-0; paperback, June 2005, ISBN 978-0-7869-3950-3; also published as the third volume in the Paths Of Darkness series)
- Promise of the Witch-King (hardcover, October 2005, ISBN 978-0-7869-3823-0; paperback, September 2006, ISBN 978-0-7869-4073-8)
- Road of the Patriarch (hardcover, October 2006, ISBN 978-0-7869-4075-2; unabridged audio CD, October 2006, ISBN 978-1-4233-1640-4; abridged audio CD, October 2006, ISBN 978-1-4233-1646-6; unabridged audio mp3 on CD, October 2006, ISBN 978-1-4233-1642-8; paperback, July 2007, ISBN 978-0-7869-4277-0)

The Sellswords trilogy was later reprinted in two different formats:

- The Sellswords Gift Set (three paperbacks in boxed slipcase, October 2008, ISBN 978-0-7869-4910-6)
- The Sellswords: A Forgotten Realms Omnibus (paperback, December 2010, ISBN 978-0-7869-5716-3)

== Sembia: Gateway To The Realms ==
By Ed Greenwood, Clayton Emery, Paul S. Kemp, Richard Lee Byers, Dave Gross, Lisa Smedman, and Voronica Whitney-Robinson.

- The Halls of Stormweather (paperback, July 2000, ISBN 978-0-7869-1560-6; paperback reissue, February 2007, ISBN 978-0-7869-4244-2) (this book is also listed under the Anthologies section, above)
  - The Patriarch: "The Burning Chalice", by Ed Greenwood
  - The Matriarch: "Song of Chaos", by Richard Lee Byers
  - The Heir: "Night School", by Clayton Emery
  - The Daughter: "The Price", by Voronica Whitney-Robinson
  - The Youngest Son: "Thirty Days", by Dave Gross
  - The Butler: "Resurrection", by Paul S. Kemp
  - The Maid: "Skin Deep", by Lisa Smedman
- Shadow's Witness, by Paul S. Kemp (paperback, November 2000, ISBN 978-0-7869-1677-1; paperback reissue, April 2007, ISBN 978-0-7869-4259-6)
- The Shattered Mask, by Richard Lee Byers (paperback, June 2001, ISBN 978-0-7869-1862-1; paperback reissue, July 2007, ISBN 978-0-7869-4266-4)
- Black Wolf, by Dave Gross (paperback, November 2001, ISBN 978-0-7869-1901-7; paperback reissue August 2007, ISBN 978-0-7869-4283-1)
- Heirs of Prophecy, by Lisa Smedman (paperback, June 2002, ISBN 978-0-7869-2737-1; paperback reissue September 2007, ISBN 978-0-7869-4290-9)
- Sands of the Soul, by Voronica Whitney-Robinson (paperback, November 2002, ISBN 978-0-7869-2813-2; paperback reissue October 2007, ISBN 978-0-7869-4337-1)
- Lord of Stormweather, by Dave Gross (paperback, March 2003, ISBN 978-0-7869-2932-0; paperback reissue February 2008, ISBN 978-0-7869-4786-7)

== The Shadow of the Avatar Trilogy ==
By Ed Greenwood (featuring Elminster)

- Shadows of Doom (paperback, March 1995, ISBN 978-0-7869-0300-9)
- Cloak of Shadows (paperback, June 1995, ISBN 978-0-7869-0301-6)
- All Shadows Fled (paperback, October 1995, ISBN 978-0-7869-0302-3)

== Shandril's Saga ==
By Ed Greenwood

- Spellfire (paperback, July 1987, ISBN 978-0-88038-587-9; expanded edition, trade paperback, April 2002, ISBN 978-0-7869-1874-4; expanded edition, paperback, February 2005, ISBN 978-0-7869-3599-4)
- Crown of Fire (previously released as The Harpers 9 in April 1994; trade paperback, June 2002, ISBN 978-0-7869-2749-4; paperback, March 2005, ISBN 978-0-7869-3619-9)
- Hand of Fire (trade paperback, September 2002, ISBN 978-0-7869-2760-9; paperback, April 2005, ISBN 978-0-7869-3646-5)

== Shadowbane Series ==
By Erik Scott de Bie

- Downshadow (paperback, April 2009, ISBN 978-0-7869-5128-4) (this book is also listed under the Ed Greenwood Presents Waterdeep section)
- Shadowbane (eBook, September 2011, ISBN 978-0-7869-5855-9)
- Eye of Justice (eBook, September 2012, ISBN 978-0-7869-6135-1)

== Songs & Swords ==
By Elaine Cunningham

The first four volumes in the Songs & Swords series were re-issues of novels previously released as part of the Harpers series.

- Elfshadow (previously released as The Harpers 2 in October 1991; paperback, April 2000, ISBN 978-0-7869-1660-3)
- Elfsong (previously released as The Harpers 8 in January 1994; paperback, April 2000, ISBN 978-0-7869-1661-0)
- Silver Shadows (previously released as The Harpers 13 in June 1996; paperback, January 2001, ISBN 978-0-7869-1799-0)
- Thornhold (previously released as The Harpers 16 in August 1998; paperback, February 2001, ISBN 978-0-7869-1808-9)
- The Dream Spheres (paperback, May 1999, ISBN 978-0-7869-1342-8)

== Starlight & Shadows ==
By Elaine Cunningham

- Daughter of the Drow (hardcover, August 1995, ISBN 978-0-7869-0165-4; paperback, September 1996, ISBN 978-0-7869-0514-0; paperback re-issue, February 2003, ISBN 978-0-7869-2929-0)
- Tangled Webs (hardcover, April 1996, ISBN 978-0-7869-0516-4; paperback, May 1998, ISBN 978-0-7869-0698-7; paperback re-issue, March 2003, ISBN 978-0-7869-2959-7)
- Windwalker (hardcover, April 2003, ISBN 978-0-7869-2968-9; paperback, April 2004, ISBN 978-0-7869-3184-2)

The Starlight & Shadows trilogy was later reprinted in:

- Starlight & Shadows Gift Set (three paperbacks in boxed slipcase, August 2005, ISBN 978-0-7869-3816-2)

== The Stone of Tymora ==
By R. A. Salvatore and Geno Salvatore

- The Stowaway (hardcover, September 2008, ISBN 978-0-7869-5094-2; paperback July 2009, ISBN 978-0-7869-5257-1)
- The Shadowmask (hardcover, November 2009, ISBN 978-0-7869-5147-5; paperback, October 2010, ISBN 978-07869-5501-5)
- The Sentinels (hardcover, August 2010, ISBN 978-0-7869-5785-9; paperback, August 2011, ISBN 978-0-7869-5785-9)

== The Sundering ==
By R. A. Salvatore, Paul S. Kemp, Erin M. Evans, Richard Lee Byers, Troy Denning, & Ed Greenwood

- The Companions, by R. A. Salvatore (hardcover, August 2013, ISBN 978-0-7869-6371-3; paperback, February 2014, ISBN 978-0-7869-6522-9)
- The Godborn, by Paul S. Kemp (hardcover, October 2013, ISBN 978-0-7869-6373-7; paperback, March 2014, ISBN 978-0-7869-6541-0)
- The Adversary, by Erin M. Evans (hardcover, December 2013, ISBN 978-0-7869-6375-1; paperback, May 2014, ISBN 978-0-7869-6536-6)
- The Reaver, by Richard Lee Byers (hardcover, February 2014, ISBN 978-0-7869-6458-1; paperback, July 2014, ISBN 978-0-7869-6542-7)
- The Sentinel by Troy Denning (hardcover, April 2014, ISBN 978-0-7869-6459-8; paperback, October 2014, ISBN 978-0-7869-6543-4)
- The Herald by Ed Greenwood hardcover, June 2014, ISBN 978-0-7869-6460-4; paperback, December 2014, ISBN 978-0-7869-6546-5)

== Sword of the Gods ==
By Bruce Cordell

- Spinner of Lies (eBook, June 2012)

== The Threat from the Sea ==
This series contains a trilogy of novels written by Mel Odom, as well as an anthology of short stories written by various authors.

- Rising Tide, by Mel Odom, (paperback, January 1999, ISBN 978-0-7869-1312-1)
- Under Fallen Stars, by Mel Odom, (paperback, October 1999, ISBN 978-0-7869-1378-7)
- The Sea Devil's Eye, by Mel Odom, (paperback, May 2000, ISBN 978-0-7869-1638-2)
- Realms of the Deep, edited by Philip Athans (paperback, March 2000, ISBN 978-0-7869-1568-2) (this book is also listed under the Anthologies section, above)
  - "Hard Choices" by Lynn Abbey
  - "Fire Is Fire" by Elaine Cunningham
  - "Messenger To Seros" by Peter Archer
  - "The Place Where Guards Snore At Their Posts" by Ed Greenwood
  - "Lost Cause" by Richard Lee Byers
  - "Forged In Fire" by Clayton Emery
  - "The One Who Swims With Sekolah" by Mel Odom
  - "The Crystal Reef" by Troy Denning
  - "The Patrol" by Larry Hobbs
  - "Star Of Tethyr" by Thomas M. Reid
  - "Persana's Blade" by Steven E. Schend
  - "And The Dark Tide Rises" by Keith Francis Strohm
  - Appendix-Calendar Of Harptos

The Threat from the Sea trilogy was later reprinted as an omnibus in:

- Threat from the Sea (paperback, April 2009, ISBN 978-0-7869-5055-3)

== Transitions ==
By R. A. Salvatore

- The Orc King (hardcover, September 2007, ISBN 978-0-7869-4340-1; paperback, July 2008, ISBN 978-0-7869-5046-1)
- The Pirate King (hardcover, October 2008, ISBN 978-0-7869-4964-9; paperback July 2009, ISBN 978-0-7869-5144-4)
- The Ghost King (hardcover, October 2009, ISBN 978-0-7869-5233-5; paperback July 2010, ISBN 978-0-7869-5499-5)

The Transitions trilogy was later reprinted in:

Transitions Gift Set (three paperbacks in boxed slipcase, October 2011, ISBN 978-0-7869-5861-0)

== The Twilight Giants ==
By Troy Denning

- The Ogre's Pact (paperback, September 1994, ISBN 978-1-56076-891-3; paperback re-issue, May 2005, ISBN 978-0-7869-3731-8)
- The Giant Among Us (paperback, February 1995, ISBN 978-0-7869-0098-5; paperback re-issue, July 2005, ISBN 978-0-7869-3758-5)
- The Titan of Twilight (paperback, September 1995, ISBN 978-0-7869-0172-2; paperback re-issue, October 2005, ISBN 978-0-7869-3798-1)

== The Twilight War ==
This series contains a trilogy of novels written by Paul S. Kemp, as well as an anthology of short stories written by various authors.

- Shadowbred (paperback, November 2006, ISBN 978-0-7869-4077-6)
- Shadowstorm (paperback, August 2007, ISBN 978-0-7869-4304-3)
- Shadowrealm (paperback, December 2008, ISBN 978-0-7869-4863-5)
- Realms of War (paperback, January 2008, ISBN 978-0-7869-4934-2) (this book is also listed under the Anthologies section, above)

== Unbroken Chain ==
By Jaleigh Johnson

- Unbroken Chain, by Jaleigh Johnson (paperback, July 2010, ISBN 978-0-7869-5626-5)
- Unbroken Chain: The Darker Road, by Jaleigh Johnson (paperback, July 2011, ISBN 978-0-7869-5533-6)

== War of the Spider Queen ==
By Richard Lee Byers, Thomas M. Reid, Richard Baker, Lisa Smedman, Philip Athans, and Paul S. Kemp. Supervising editor, R. A. Salvatore.

- Dissolution, by Richard Lee Byers (hardcover, July 2002, ISBN 978-0-7869-2714-2; paperback, August 2003, ISBN 978-0-7869-2944-3)
- Insurrection, by Thomas M. Reid (hardcover, December 2002, ISBN 978-0-7869-2786-9; paperback, December 2003, ISBN 978-0-7869-3033-3)
- Condemnation, by Richard Baker (hardcover, May 2003, ISBN 978-0-7869-2824-8; paperback, May 2004, ISBN 978-0-7869-3202-3)
- Extinction, by Lisa Smedman (hardcover, January 2004, ISBN 978-0-7869-2989-4; paperback, February 2005, ISBN 978-0-7869-3596-3)
- Annihilation, by Philip Athans (hardcover, July 2004, ISBN 978-0-7869-3237-5; paperback, August 2005, ISBN 978-0-7869-3752-3)
- Resurrection, by Paul S. Kemp (hardcover, April 2005, ISBN 978-0-7869-3640-3; paperback, February 2006, ISBN 978-0-7869-3981-7)

War of the Spider Queen was later reprinted in:

- War of the Spider Queen Gift Set, Part I (books 1-3) (three paperbacks in boxed slipcase, September 2006, ISBN 978-0-7869-4186-5)
- War of the Spider Queen Gift Set, Part II (books 4-6) (three paperbacks in boxed slipcase, September 2006, ISBN 978-0-7869-4307-4)
- R.A. Salvatore's War of the Spider Queen, Volume I (books 1-3) (paperback, April 2012, ISBN 978-0-7869-5986-0)
- R.A. Salvatore's War of the Spider Queen, Volume II (books 4-6) (paperback, May 2012, ISBN 978-0-7869-6028-6)

== The Watercourse Trilogy ==
By Philip Athans

- Whisper of Waves (paperback, November 2005, ISBN 978-0-7869-3837-7)
- Lies of Light (paperback, September 2006, ISBN 978-0-7869-4019-6)
- Scream of Stone (paperback, June 2007, ISBN 978-0-7869-4271-8)

== Ed Greenwood Presents Waterdeep ==
By Steven E. Schend, Jaleigh Johnson, Erik Scott de Bie, Rosemary Jones, Erin M. Evans and James P. Davis

- Blackstaff Tower, by Steven E. Schend (paperback, September 2008, ISBN 978-0-7869-4913-7)
- Mistshore, by Jaleigh Johnson (paperback, September 2008, ISBN 978-0-7869-4966-3)
- Downshadow, by Erik Scott de Bie (paperback, April 2009, ISBN 978-0-7869-5128-4) (this book is also listed under the Shadowbane Series section)
- City of the Dead, by Rosemary Jones (paperback, June 2009, ISBN 978-0-7869-5129-1)
- The God Catcher, by Erin M. Evans (paperback, February 2010, ISBN 978-0-7869-5486-5)
- Circle of Skulls, by James P. Davis (paperback, May 2010, ISBN 978-0-7869-5485-8)

Ed Greenwood Presents Waterdeep was later reprinted in:

- Ed Greenwood Presents Waterdeep, Book 1, by Steven E. Schend, Jaleigh Johnson, Erik Scott de Bie (containing Blackstaff Tower, Mistshore, and Downshadow) (paperback, July 2011, ISBN 978-0-7869-5818-4)
- Ed Greenwood Presents Waterdeep, Book 2, by Rosemary Jones, Erin M. Evans, James P. Davis (containing City of the Dead, The God Catcher, and Circle of Skulls) (paperback, December 2011, ISBN 978-0-7869-5851-1)

== The Wilds ==
By Jenna Helland, James P. Davis, Jak Koke, Mel Odom

- The Fanged Crown, by Jenna Helland (paperback, January 2009, ISBN 978-0-7869-5093-5)
- The Restless Shore, by James P. Davis (paperback, May 2009, ISBN 978-0-7869-5131-4)
- The Edge of Chaos, by Jak Koke (paperback, August 2009, ISBN 978-0-7869-5189-5)
- Wrath of the Blue Lady, by Mel Odom (paperback, December 2009, ISBN 978-0-7869-5192-5)

== The Wizards ==
By Steven E. Schend, James P. Davis, Bruce R. Cordell and Mark Sehestedt

- Blackstaff, by Steven E. Schend (paperback, July 2006, ISBN 978-0-7869-4016-5)
- Bloodwalk, by James P. Davis (paperback, July 2006, ISBN 978-0-7869-4018-9)
- Darkvision, by Bruce R. Cordell (paperback, September 2006, ISBN 978-0-7869-4017-2)
- Frostfell, by Mark Sehestedt (paperback, December 2006, ISBN 978-0-7869-4245-9)

== The Year of Rogue Dragons ==
This series contains a trilogy of novels written by Richard Lee Byers, as well as two anthologies of short stories written by various authors. The series explores the ancient secrets of dragons and their society.

- The Rage, by Richard Lee Byers (paperback, April 2004, ISBN 978-0-7869-3187-3)
- The Rite, by Richard Lee Byers (paperback, January 2005, ISBN 978-0-7869-3581-9)
- The Ruin, by Richard Lee Byers (paperback, May 2006, ISBN 978-0-7869-4003-5)
- Realms of the Dragons, edited by Philip Athans (paperback, October 2004, ISBN 978-0-7869-3394-5) (this book is also listed under the Anthologies section, above)
  - "Soulbound", by Paul S. Kemp
  - "First Flight", by Edward Bolme
  - "Gorlist's Dragon", by Elaine Cunningham
  - "The Keeper of Secrets", by Ed Greenwood
  - "The Topaz Dragon", by Jess Lebow
  - "Wickless in the Nether", by R. A. Salvatore
  - "Serpestrillvith", by Richard Baker
  - "Waylaid", by Thomas M. Reid
  - "Standard Delving Procedure", by Lisa Smedman
  - "An Icy Heart", by Voronica Whitney-Robinson
  - "Penitential Rites", by Keith Francis Strohm
  - "How Sharper Than a Serpent's Tooth", by Dave Gross
  - "Beer with a Fat Dragon", by Don Bassingthwaite
  - "The Prisoner of Hulburg", by Richard Lee Byers
- Realms of the Dragons II, edited by Philip Athans (paperback, May 2005, ISBN 978-0-7869-3808-7) (this book is also listed under the Anthologies section, above)
  - "Faerie Ire", by Erin Tettensor
  - "The Woman Who Drew Dragons", by Rosemary Jones
  - "The Hunting Game", by Erik Scott de Bie
  - "The Road Home", by Harley Stroh
  - "How Burlmarr Saved the Unseen Protector", by Kameron M. Franklin
  - "A Tall Tale", by J.L. Collins
  - "The Book Dragon", by Jim Pitrat
  - "Freedom's Promise", by Ed Gentry
  - "Possessions", by James P. Davis
  - "Queen of the Mountain", by Jaleigh Johnson
  - "The Strength of the Jester", by Murray J.D. Leeder

The Year of Rogue Dragons trilogy was later reprinted as an omnibus in:

- The Year of Rogue Dragons (paperback, October 2010, ISBN 978-0-7869-5574-9)

== Standalone novels ==
- Once Around the Realms, by Brian Thomsen (paperback, April 1995, ISBN 978-0-7869-0119-7)
- Evermeet: Island of Elves, by Elaine Cunningham (hardcover, April 1998, ISBN 978-0-7869-0713-7; paperback, March 1999, ISBN 978-0-7869-1354-1)
- The Shadow Stone, by Richard Baker (paperback, September 1998, ISBN 978-0-7869-1186-8)
- The Glass Prison, by Monte Cook (paperback, April 1999, ISBN 978-0-7869-1343-5)
- Silverfall: Stories of the Seven Sisters, by Ed Greenwood (paperback, August 1999; ISBN 978-0-7869-1365-7; paperback re-issue, January 2005, ISBN 978-0-7869-3572-7)
- Pool of Radiance: Ruins of Myth Drannor, by Carrie A. Bebris (paperback, August 2001; ISBN 978-0-7869-1387-9; based on the computer game)
- Sandstorm, by Christopher Rowe (paperback, March 2011, ISBN 978-0-7869-5742-2)
- Dawnbringer, by Samantha Henderson (paperback, May 2011, ISBN 978-0-7869-5794-1)
- Venom in Her Veins, by Tim Pratt (paperback, March 2012, ISBN 978-0-7869-5984-6)
- The Rose of Sarifal, by Paulina Claiborne (paperback/audio book/eBook, May 2012, ISBN 978-0-7869-3026-5)
- The Gilded Rune, by Lisa Smedman (paperback, July 2012, ISBN 978-0-7869-6030-9)
- Prince of Ravens by Richard Baker (audio book/eBook, July 2012, ISBN 978-0-7869-6131-3)
- If Ever They Happened Upon My Lair by R. A. Salvatore (eBook, September 2012)
- Spider and Stone by Jaleigh Johnson (eBook, November 2012)
- Spellstorm by Ed Greenwood (hardcover/eBook, June 2015, ISBN 978-0-7869-6571-7; paperback, May 2016; ISBN 978-0-7869-6576-2)
- Death Masks by Ed Greenwood (hardcover/eBook, June 2016, ISBN 978-0-7869-6593-9)

== Anthologies ==
By various authors

- Realms of Valor, edited by James Lowder (paperback, February 1993, ISBN 978-1-56076-557-8)
  - "The Lord Of Lowhill" by Douglas Niles
  - "Elminster At The Magefair" by Ed Greenwood
  - "One Last Drink" by Christie Golden
  - "The Bargain" by Elaine Cunningham
  - "Patronage" by David Cook
  - "A Virtue By Reflection" by Scott Ciencin
  - "King's Tear" by Mark Anthony
  - "The Family Business" by James Lowder
  - "Grandfather's Toys" by Jean Rabe
  - "The Curse Of Tegea" by Troy Denning
  - "Dark Mirror" by R. A. Salvatore
- Realms of Infamy, edited by James Lowder (paperback, December 1994, ISBN 978-1-56076-911-8)
  - "So High A Price" by Ed Greenwood
  - "The More Things Change" by Elaine Cunningham
  - "The Meaning Of Lore" by Barb Hendee
  - "Raven's Egg" by Elaine Bergstrom
  - "The Third Level" by R. A. Salvatore
  - "Blood Sport" by Christie Golden
  - "Gallows Day" by David Cook
  - "A Matter Of Thorns" by James M. Ward
  - "Stolen Spells" by Denise Vitola
  - "The Greatest Hero Who Ever Died" by J. Robert King
  - "Twilight" by Troy Denning
  - "The Walls Of Midnight" by Mark Anthony
  - "And Ringing Of Hands" by Jane Cooper Hong
  - "Thieves' Honor" by Mary H. Herbert
  - "Laughter In The Flames" by James Lowder
  - "Vision" by Roger E. Moore
- Realms of Magic, edited by Brian Thomsen and J. Robert King (paperback, December 1995, ISBN 978-0-7869-0303-0)
  - "Prologue" by Brian Thomsen
  - "Guenhwyvar" by R. A. Salvatore
  - "Smoke Powder And Mirrors" by Jeff Grubb
  - "The Magic Thief" by Mark Anthony
  - "The Quiet Place" by Christie Golden
  - "The Eye Of The Dragon" by Ed Greenwood
  - "Every Dog His Day" by Dave Gross
  - "The Common Spell" by Kate Novak-Grubb
  - "The First Moonwell" by Douglas Niles
  - "The Luck Of Llewellyn The Loquacious" by Allen C. Kupfer
  - "Too Familiar" by David Cook
  - "Red Ambition" by Jean Rabe
  - "Thieves' Reward" by Mary H. Herbert
  - "Six Of Swords" by William W. Connors
  - "The Wild Bunch" by Tom Dupree
  - "A Worm Too Soft" by J. Robert King
  - "Gunne Runner" by Roger E. Moore
  - "The Direct Approach" by Elaine Cunningham
  - "Epilogue" by Brian Thomsen
- Realms of the Underdark, edited by J. Robert King (paperback, April 1996, ISBN 978-0-7869-0487-7)
  - "Preface: At The Publishing House" by Brian Thomsen
  - "The Fires Of Narbondel" by Mark Anthony
  - "A Slow Day In Skullport" by Ed Greenwood
  - "Rite Of Blood" by Elaine Cunningham
  - "Sea Of Ghosts" by Roger E. Moore
  - "Volo Does Menzo" by Brian Thomsen
  - "Postscript: Back At The Publishing House" by Brian Thomsen
- Realms of the Arcane, edited by Brian Thomsen (paperback, November 1997, ISBN 978-0-7869-0647-5)
  - "Prologue" by Wes Nicholson
  - "Wishing You Many More" by David Cook
  - "Secrets Of Blood, Spirits Of The Sea" by Elaine Cunningham
  - "Bread Storm Rising" by Tom Dupree
  - "Interlude" by Wes Nicholson
  - "When Even Sky Cities Fall" by J. Robert King
  - "The Grotto Of Dreams" by Mark Anthony
  - "A Narrowed Gaze" by Monte Cook
  - "The Whispering Crown" by Ed Greenwood
  - "The Lady And The Shadow" by Philip Athans
  - "Shadows Of The Past" by Brian Thomsen
  - "Tertius And The Artifact" by Jeff Grubb
  - "Epilogue" by Wes Nicholson
- Realms of Mystery, edited by Philip Athans (paperback, June 1998, ISBN 978-0-7869-1171-4)
  - "The Devil and Tertius Wands" by Jeff Grubb
  - "Speaking With The Dead" by Elaine Cunningham
  - "A Walk In The Snow" by Dave Gross
  - "The Rose Window" by Monte Cook
  - "The Club Rules" by James Lowder
  - "Thieves' Justice" by Mary H. Herbert
  - "Ekhar Lorrent: Gnome Detective" by Steven "Stan!" Brown
  - "The Devil And Teritus Wands" by Jeff Grubb
  - "H" by Richard Lee Byers
  - "Strange Bedfellows" by Keith Francis Strohm
  - "Whence The Song Of Steel" by J. Robert King
  - "An Unusual Suspect" by Brian Thomsen
  - "Darkly, Through A Glass Of Ale" by Peter Archer
  - "Lynaelle" by Thomas M. Reid
  - "The Grinning Ghost Of Taverton Hall" by Ed Greenwood
- Realms of the Deep, edited by Philip Athans (paperback, March 2000, ISBN 978-0-7869-1568-2) (this anthology is part of the Threat from the Sea series, listed below)
  - "Hard Choices" by Lynn Abbey
  - "Fire Is Fire" by Elaine Cunningham
  - "Messenger To Seros" by Peter Archer
  - "The Place Where Guards Snore At Their Posts" by Ed Greenwood
  - "Lost Cause" by Richard Lee Byers
  - "Forged In Fire" by Clayton Emery
  - "The One Who Swims With Sekolah" by Mel Odom
  - "The Crystal Reef" by Troy Denning
  - "The Patrol" by Larry Hobbs
  - "Star Of Tethyr" by Thomas M. Reid
  - "Persana's Blade" by Steven E. Schend
  - "And The Dark Tide Rises" by Keith Francis Strohm
  - Appendix-Calendar Of Harptos
- The Halls of Stormweather, edited by Philip Athans (paperback, July 2000, ISBN 978-0-7869-1560-6; paperback re-issue, February 2007, ISBN 978-0-7869-4244-2) (this anthology is part of the Sembia: Gateway To The Realms series, listed below)
  - The Patriarch: "The Burning Chalice", by Ed Greenwood
  - The Matriarch: "Song of Chaos", by Richard Lee Byers
  - The Heir: "Night School", by Clayton Emery
  - The Daughter: "The Price", by Voronica Whitney-Robinson
  - The Youngest Son: "Thirty Days", by Dave Gross
  - The Butler: "Resurrection", by Paul S. Kemp
  - The Maid: "Skin Deep", by Lisa Smedman
- Realms of Shadow, edited by Lizz Baldwin (paperback, April 2002, ISBN 978-0-7869-2716-6) (this anthology is part of the Return of the Archwizards series, listed below)
  - "Trial by Ordeal", by Lisa Smedman
  - "Assassin's Shadow", by Jess Lebow
  - "Too Long in the Dark", by Paul S. Kemp
  - "Darksword", by Troy Denning
  - "Liar's Game", by Jessica Beaven
  - "That Curious Sword", by R. A. Salvatore
  - "A Little Knowledge", by Elaine Cunningham
  - "Astride the Wind", by Philip Athans
  - "The Fallen Lands", by Murray J. D. Leeder
  - "When Shadows Come Seeking a Throne", by Ed Greenwood
  - "King Shadow", by Richard Lee Byers
  - "The Shifting Sands", by Peter Archer
- The Best of the Realms, edited by R. A. Salvatore (paperback, November 2003, ISBN 978-0-7869-3024-1)
  - "Rite of Blood", by Elaine Cunningham
  - "Elminster at the Magefair", by Ed Greenwood
  - "Darksword", by Troy Denning
  - "Blood Sport", by Christie Golden
  - "Six of Swords", by William W. Connors
  - "The Rose Window", by Monte Cook
  - "The First Moonwell", by Douglas Niles
  - "The Greatest Hero Who Ever Died", by J. Robert King
  - "Tertius and the Artifact", by Jeff Grubb
  - "Red Ambition", by Jean Rabe
  - "The Common Spell", by Kate Novak-Grubb
  - "Assassin's Shadow", by Jess Lebow
  - "And the Dark Tide Rises", by Keith Francis Strohm
  - "Empty Joys", by R. A. Salvatore
- Realms of the Dragons, edited by Philip Athans (paperback, October 2004, ISBN 978-0-7869-3394-5) (this anthology is part of the Year of Rogue Dragons series, listed below)
  - "Soulbound", by Paul S. Kemp
  - "First Flight", by Edward Bolme
  - "Gorlist's Dragon", by Elaine Cunningham
  - "The Keeper of Secrets", by Ed Greenwood
  - "The Topaz Dragon", by Jess Lebow
  - "Wickless in the Nether", by R. A. Salvatore
  - "Serpestrillvith", by Richard Baker
  - "Waylaid", by Thomas M. Reid
  - "Standard Delving Procedure", by Lisa Smedman
  - "An Icy Heart", by Voronica Whitney-Robinson
  - "Penitential Rites", by Keith Francis Strohm
  - "How Sharper Than a Serpent's Tooth", by Dave Gross
  - "Beer with a Fat Dragon", by Don Bassingthwaite
  - "The Prisoner of Hulburg", by Richard Lee Byers
- Realms of the Dragons II, edited by Philip Athans (paperback, May 2005, ISBN 978-0-7869-3808-7) (this anthology is part of the Year of Rogue Dragons series, listed below)
  - "Faerie Ire", by Erin Tettensor
  - "The Woman Who Drew Dragons", by Rosemary Jones
  - "The Hunting Game", by Erik Scott de Bie
  - "The Road Home", by Harley Stroh
  - "How Burlmarr Saved the Unseen Protector", by Kameron M. Franklin
  - "A Tall Tale", by J.L. Collins
  - "The Book Dragon", by Jim Pitrat
  - "Freedom's Promise", by Ed Gentry
  - "Possessions", by James P. Davis
  - "Queen of the Mountain", by Jaleigh Johnson
  - "The Strength of the Jester", by Murray J.D. Leeder
- The Best of the Realms II: The Stories of Ed Greenwood, edited by Susan J. Morris (paperback, July 2005, ISBN 978-0-7869-3760-8)
  - "Not the Most Successful of Feasts"
  - "Dark Talons Forbear Thee"
  - "The Whispering Crown"
  - "So High a Price"
  - "One Comes, Unheralded, to Zirta"
  - "A Dance in Storm's Garden"
  - "A Slow Day in Skullport"
  - "Bloodbound"
  - "How Wisdom Came to the Maimed Wizard"
  - "The Eye of the Dragon"
  - "Nothing But Trouble"
  - "The Grinning Ghost of Taverton Hall"
  - "The Place Where Guards Snore at Their Posts"
  - "Living Forever"
  - "The Long Road Home"
- Realms of the Elves, edited by Philip Athans (paperback, February 2006, ISBN 978-0-7869-3980-0) (this anthology is part of the Last Mythal series, listed below)
  - "Traitors", by Richard Lee Byers
  - "The Staff of Valmaxian", by Philip Athans
  - "Necessary Sacrifices", by Lisa Smedman
  - "The Greater Treasure", by Erik Scott de Bie
  - "Comrades at Odds", by R. A. Salvatore
  - "Tears so White", by Ed Greenwood
  - "The Bladesinger's Lesson", by Richard Baker
- The Best of the Realms III: The Stories of Elaine Cunningham, edited by Philip Athans and Erin Evans (paperback, May 2007, ISBN 978-0-7869-4288-6)
  - "The Knights of Samular"
  - "The Bargain"
  - "Elminster's Jest"
  - "The More Things Change"
  - "The Direct Approach"
  - "Secrets of Blood, Spirits of the Sea"
  - "The Great Hunt"
  - "Speaking with the Dead"
  - "Stolen Dreams"
  - "Fire is Fire"
  - "Possessions"
  - "A Little Knowledge"
  - "Games of Chance"
  - "Tribute"
  - "Answered Prayers"
- Realms of War, edited by Philip Athans (paperback, January 2008, ISBN 978-0-7869-4934-2) (this anthology is part of the Twilight War series, listed below)
  - "Continuum", by Paul S. Kemp
  - "The Last Paladin of Ilmater", by Susan J. Morris
  - "Black Arrow", by Bruce R. Cordell
  - "Too Many Princes", by Ed Greenwood
  - "The Siege of Zerith Hold", by Jess Lebow
  - "Mercy's Reward", by Mark Sehestedt
  - "Redemption", by Elaine Cunningham
  - "Changing Tides", by Mel Odom
  - "Chase the Dark", by Jaleigh Johnson
  - "Bones and Stones", by R. A. Salvatore
  - "Weasel's Run", by Lisa Smedman
  - "Second Chance", by Richard Lee Byers
- Realms of the Dead, edited by Susan J. Morris (paperback, January 2010, ISBN 978-0-7869-5363-9) (this anthology is part of the Haunted Lands series, listed below)
  - "A Body in a Bag", by Erik Scott de Bie
  - "A Prayer for Brother Robert", by Philip Athans
  - "Dusty Bones", by Rosemary Jones
  - "Feast of the Moon", by Christopher Rowe
  - "Iruladoon", by R. A. Salvatore
  - "Pieces", by Richard Lee Byers
  - "Soul Steel", by Lisa Smedman
  - "The Bone Bird", by Jaleigh Johnson
  - "The King in Copper", by Richard Baker
  - "The Many Murders of Manshoon", by Ed Greenwood
  - "The Resurrection Agent", by Erin M. Evans
  - "Wandering Stones", by Bruce R. Cordell
- Untold Adventures (January 2011, ISBN 978-0-7869-5837-5)
