= Dungeons & Dragons novels =

Fiction based on roleplaying game

Dungeons & Dragons novels are works of fantasy fiction based upon campaign settings of the Dungeons & Dragons role-playing game.

== History ==
The first novel based on the Dungeons & Dragons game was Quag Keep (1978) by Andre Norton. Based upon Norton's first experience at playing the Dungeons & Dragons game, it told the story of seven gamers who were drawn into a fantasy setting. The sequel, Return to Quag Keep (2006), was published after Norton had died in 2005.

A series of authorized novels began in the early 1980s with a survey of Advanced Dungeons & Dragons players. The feedback indicated that the players wanted more dragons in the media products from TSR, Inc. In May 1983, TSR commissioned Tracy Hickman to produce a new campaign setting that would be called Dragonlance. For marketing purposes, TSR also decided to release a series of books based in the same setting. The first three books became the highly successful Dragonlance Chronicles Trilogy.

As the time and cost needed to develop a commercial role-playing game are rarely matched by the profits made from selling the end product, the rulebooks are primarily sold to create a market for the sale of related products. TSR found a lucrative market when they released a series spinoff novels based on the Dragonlance and Dark Sun campaign settings. These novels stood on their own and did not require knowledge of the game rules, making them accessible by a more general audience. TSR published several gamebook series, such as Endless Quest, Advanced Dungeons & Dragons Adventure Gamebooks, Fantasy Forest, and HeartQuest, which were based on the D&D settings.

The most successful of the novel series produced by TSR during the 1990s were the books based upon the Forgotten Realms and Dragonlance settings. These works also proved to have an unusual shelf life, remaining in print for at least a decade. As a result, some fantasy fiction authors that were introduced through the TSR novels became popular authors. Among these are R. A. Salvatore and the writing partnership of Margaret Weis and Tracy Hickman. Before they went bankrupt in 1997, TSR had published 242 novels based in their campaign settings, with 55 set in the Dragonlance setting and 64 set in the world of Forgotten Realms. TSR's novels were published in ten languages and some made it on to international best seller lists. Other publishers followed the TSR model, including FASA, White Wolf and West End Games.

By the 2000s, a significant portion of all fantasy paperbacks sales were being published by Wizards of the Coast, the American game company that acquired TSR in 1997. The works of R. A. Salvatore in particular have proven very popular, with his novels appearing on The New York Times best seller list 22 times as of 2010.

In 2021, HarperCollins Children's Books obtained exclusive rights to publish Dungeons & Dragons middle grade books such as "novels, illustrated chapter books, and graphic novels".

== Authors ==
The following authors have written one or more full length Dungeons & Dragons novels:

- Lynn Abbey
- Mark Anthony
- Robin Wayne Bailey
- Keith Baker
- Richard Baker
- Don Bassingthwaite
- Elaine Bergstrom
- John Gregory Betancourt
- Edward Bolme
- Timothy Brown
- Richard Lee Byers
- Andria Cardarelle
- Tonya R. Carter
- Scott Ciencin
- Adrian Cole
- David Cook
- Monte Cook
- Bruce Cordell
- Paul Crilley
- Elaine Cunningham
- Tina Daniell
- Graeme Davis
- James P. Davis
- Erik Scott de Bie
- Keith R. A. DeCandido
- Troy Denning
- Gene DeWeese
- Parker DeWolf
- P. N. Elrod
- Ru Emerson
- Clayton Emery
- Rose Estes
- Erin M. Evans
- Nigel Findley
- Matt Forbeck
- Kameron M. Franklin
- Ed Gentry
- Christie Golden
- Ed Greenwood
- Dave Gross
- Jeff Grubb
- Thorarinn Gunnarsson
- Gary Gygax
- Laurell K. Hamilton
- Simon Hawke
- D.J. Heinrich
- Samantha Henderson
- Tracy Hickman
- Russ T. Howard
- Tanya Huff
- Ryan Hughes
- Jaliegh Johnson
- Drew Karpyshyn
- Paul S. Kemp
- Pauli Kidd
- J. Robert King
- Mary Kirchoff
- Jess Lebow
- Jeff LaSala
- James Lowder
- Dixie Lee McKeone
- Victor Milán
- Roger E. Moore
- Douglas Niles
- Kate Novak
- Mel Odom
- David A. Page
- Dan Parkinson
- Chris Pierson
- Ellen Porath
- Jean Rabe
- Thomas M. Reid
- Marsheila Rockwell
- R. A. Salvatore
- Mark Sehestedt
- Morris Simon
- Bill Slavicsek
- Lisa Smedman
- Kevin Stein
- Keith Francis Strohm
- Paul B. Thompson
- Tim Waggoner
- Margaret Weis
- Michael Williams
- Chet Williamson
- Steve Winter
- Rich Wulf
- James Wyatt

== Campaign settings ==
The following Dungeons & Dragons campaign settings have had one or more published novels based in the same fantasy world:

- Birthright
- Dark Sun
- Dragonlance
- Eberron
- Forgotten Realms
- Greyhawk
- Kara-Tur
- Mystara
- Planescape
- Ravenloft
- Spelljammer
