= Realms of the Elves =

2006 anthology by Richard Lee Byers

- First edition
- Cover artist: Adam Rex
- Language: English
- Genre: Fantasy
- Publication place: United States
- Media type: Print (paperback)
- Pages: 340
- ISBN: 0-7869-3980-X

Realms of the Elves is a fantasy anthology novel edited by Philip Athans, set in the world of the Forgotten Realms, and based on the Dungeons & Dragons role-playing game. It is part of "The Last Mythal" series. It was published in paperback in February 2006 (ISBN 0-7869-3980-X).

== Contents ==
Realms of the Elves is an anthology of seven short stories written by Richard Lee Byers, Philip Athans, Lisa Smedman, Erik Scott de Bie, R.A. Salvatore, Ed Greenwood, and Richard Baker.

== Reception ==
Internet Bookwatch gave Realms of the Elves a glowing review, saying it is "an impressive and memorable collection". The review recommended the anthology to fans of heroic fantasy and called it " an ideal introduction to the Elven world."
