= Eyes of Amber and Other Stories =

1979 short story collection by Joan D. Vinge

Eyes of Amber and Other Stories is a collection of short stories by Joan D. Vinge, published in 1979.

== Reception ==
Greg Costikyan reviewed Eyes of Amber and Other Stories in Ares Magazine #2 and commented that "Vinge's stories are melodious, haunting, and tinged with sadness. At their best, they unify all the elements that make up good science fiction: thoughtful premises, good plotting, spare but descriptive prose, solid characterization, and emotional content."

== Reviews ==
- Review by David Pettus (1980) in Fan Plus, #1 January 1980
- Review [French] by Denis Guiot (1980) in Fiction, #307
- Review by Ken Methold (1983) in Omega Science Digest, March–April 1983
- Kliatt
