= The Nobles =

The Nobles is a series of novels by David Cook, Victor Milán, Mark Anthony, Brian Thomsen, Paul Kidd, and Lynn Abbey, set in the Forgotten Realms campaign setting.

== Plot summary ==
The books all touch on the schemes of the nobility in Faerûn, and are a look into the politics behind powers such as Tethyr, Waterdeep, and the Vilhon Reach.

== Novels ==
- King Pinch, by David Cook (paperback, May 1995, ISBN 978-0-7869-0127-2)
- War in Tethyr, by Victor Milán (paperback, October 1995, ISBN 978-0-7869-0184-5)
- Escape from Undermountain, by Mark Anthony (paperback, February 1996, ISBN 978-0-7869-0477-8)
- The Mage in the Iron Mask, by Brian Thomsen (paperback, August 1996, ISBN 978-0-7869-0506-5)
- The Council of Blades, by Paul Kidd (paperback, November 1997, ISBN 978-0-7869-0531-7)
- The Simbul's Gift, by Lynn Abbey (paperback, November 1997, ISBN 978-0-7869-0763-2)
