= Cormyr: A Novel =

1996 novel by Ed Greenwood and Jeff Grubb

- Cover
- Authors: Ed Greenwood; Jeff Grubb
- Language: English
- Series: The Cormyr Saga
- Genre: Fantasy novel
- Published: 1996
- Publication place: United States
- Media type: Print (Hardcover and Paperback)

Cormyr: A Novel is a fantasy novel by Ed Greenwood and Jeff Grubb, set in the world of the Forgotten Realms, and based on the Dungeons & Dragons role-playing game. It is the first novel published in "The Cormyr Saga". It was published in hardcover in July 1996 ISBN 978-0-7869-0503-4, and in paperback in April 1998 ISBN 978-0-7869-0710-6.

== Plot summary ==
Cormyr is a novel in which a conspiracy in the court of Cormyr is told in a series of stories which take place from the days of the founding of the kingdom, throughout its history up to the time of the main story.

== Reception ==
Gideon Kibblewhite reviewed Cormyr: A Novel for Arcane magazine, rating it a 7 out of 10 overall. He comments that "At the heart of this novel is an ordinary but affable tale of a conspiracy in the court of Cormyr. [...] We are told of the growth of an encampment of men in a forest glade into a nation; we are told of the village leaders from whom spring a line of kings. Then there is the myth of the forest itself - the abode, in turn, of dragons, elves and men. The myth of the dragon - a potent symbol at TSR - pervades all of Cormyr's proud past." He continues by saying "The chapters which tell of these deeds of long ago succeed far more than most game tie-in novels, in that they add not just flesh and structure to a campaign setting, but a sense of warmth towards the place, as well. The words of Tolkien and Leiber, for example, transport you to a magical world, while it is more difficult for a book based on a game to do so. Cormyr manages it, though, with much aplomb, making this a valuable aid to those who might wish to adventure in such a land. For here you not only have a location, but a whole history." Kibblewhite concludes his review by saying, "It's all told at great speed, flicking from age to age like a book of short stories with a common thread. As such, it works really well, Sure, it's sometimes pretty cheesy fare, but what did you expect - Dickens?"

== Reviews ==
- Kliatt
- Science Fiction Chronicle
