= Daughter of Prophecy =

1995 novel by Anne Kelleher Bush

- Author: Anne Kelleher Bush
- Language: English
- Genre: Science fantasy
- Publisher: Warner Books
- Publication date: 1995
- Publication place: United States
- ISBN: 0446600873
- OCLC: 32028158

Daughter of Prophecy is a science fantasy novel written by Anne Kelleher Bush. Her debut novel, it is the first entry of her Power and the Pattern series.

== Reception ==
Dan Silver of Realms of Fantasy opined that while Bush's "skill at developing her story was not consistently matched by the quality of her writing", she "created a wonderful and richly textured world" and "manages to raise her tale above the cliches of many first novels." Susan Cromby of Kliatt called it an "interesting story with intriguing concepts." Publishers Weekly wrote that while Bush "at times displays a vivid imagination, it is underutilized: too many pages pass without anything wondrous, and the most promising twists come only with the final chapters."
