= Spellfire (novel) =

1987 novel by Ed Greenwood

- Cover of the first edition
- Author: Ed Greenwood
- Cover artist: Clyde Caldwell
- Language: English
- Series: Shandril's Saga
- Genre: Fantasy novel
- Publisher: TSR
- Publication date: July 1988
- Publication place: United States
- Media type: Print (Paperback)
- ISBN: 0-88038-587-1
- OCLC: 49701608
- Dewey Decimal: 813/.54 22
- LC Class: PR9199.3.G759 S64 2002
- Followed by: Crown of Fire

Spellfire is a fantasy novel written by Ed Greenwood and published in 1988. It is the first novel in Ed Greenwood's book series, Shandril's Saga, and takes place in the Forgotten Realms setting based on the Dungeons & Dragons fantasy role-playing game.

== Plot summary ==
The book follows the journey of an orphaned girl named Shandril who later leaves her home and embarks on a journey, thus discovering love, and of course "Spellfire".

== Reception ==
In the Io9 series revisiting older Dungeons & Dragons novels, Rob Bricken commented that "This book is terrible. It's the sort of top-to-bottom awfulness I expected to encounter when I started looking back at these D&D novels but then forgot about after I was lulled into a false sense of security by nominal competency of the first few books."

== Reviews ==
- Kliatt
