= Deep Survival =

Survival case-studies by Laurence Gonzales

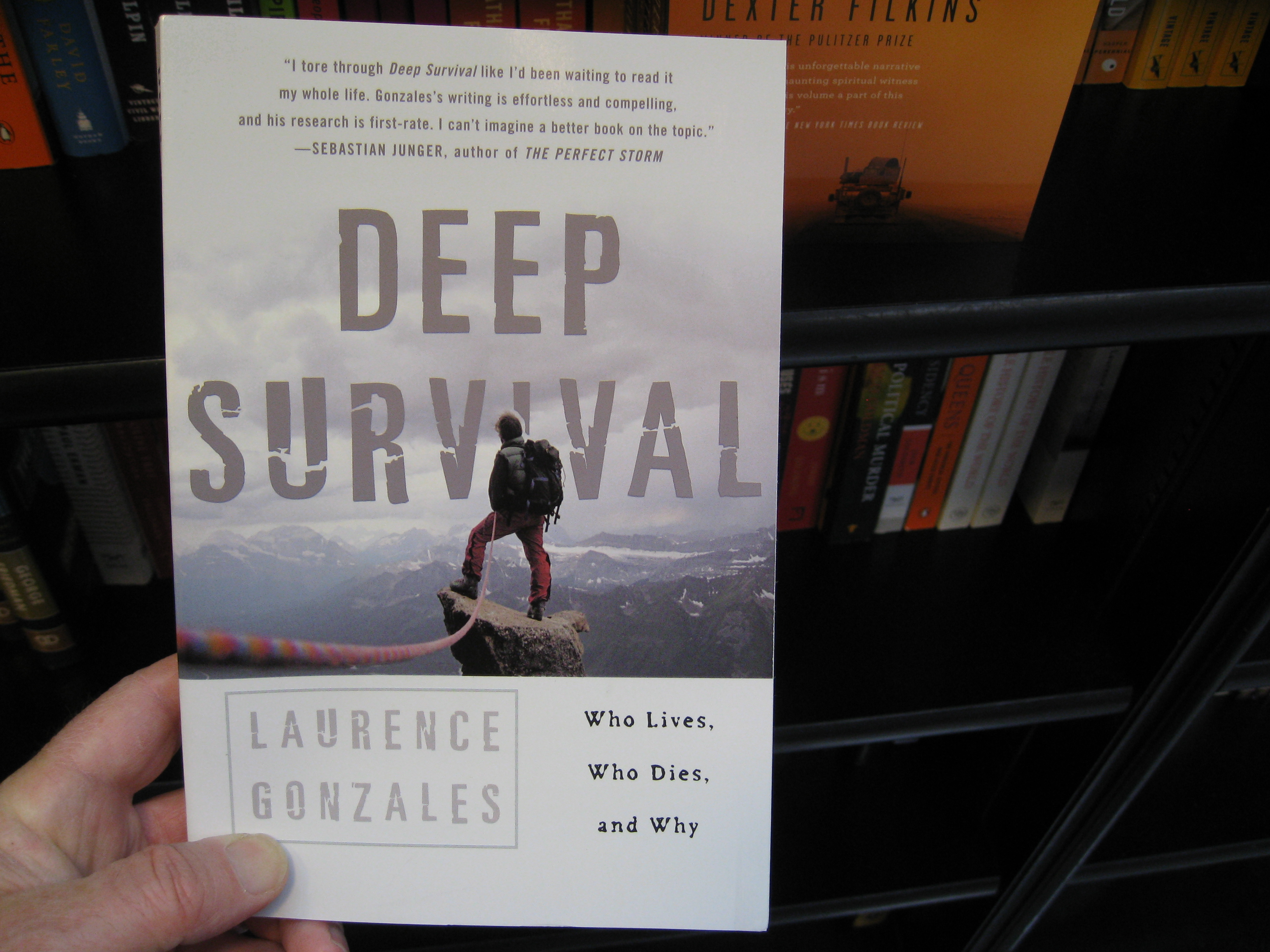
Deep Survival: Who Lives, Who Dies, and Why. Laurence Gonzales. Paperback published October 17th 2004 by W. W. Norton Company

Deep Survival: Who Lives, Who Dies, and Why is a 2003 analysis of survival case-studies by Laurence Gonzales. It was first published in hardcover during October 2003 by W. W. Norton & Company and recounts the stories of people who have experienced life-threatening events. The book investigates how people remain alive during disastrous situations and Gonzales analyses how and why people get themselves into dangerous situations.

In 2018, Gonzales received the Montaigne Medal from the Eric Hoffer Society for Deep Survival: Who Lives, Who Dies, and Why.

== Synopsis ==
The book is separated into two sections. The first examines how accidents can occur, which Gonzales states can happen due to bad habits and because the human brain is wired to create frameworks for past experiences. With continuous repetition, it may become difficult to assess each new circumstance in accordance with the conditions directly at hand. For example, a person might associate a certain activity with a positive outcome and inadvertently ignore the present red flags that spring up along their way.

The second section focuses on survival. According to Gonzales' research, survival involves clear and decisive action in the midst of chaos. This can be difficult to do when experiencing flight-or-fight mode, and choosing to move and not change directions or to backtrack can be daunting to people lost in the wilderness.

== Reception ==
Publishers Weekly reviewed the book, stating that "Remembering these rules when crisis strikes may be tough, but Gonzales's vivid descriptions of life in the balance will stay with readers." It also received reviews for the audiobook and print formats from Kliatt and from Booklist, who reviewed the print version.
