= Crown of Fire =

1994 novel by Ed Greenwood

- Cover of the first edition
- Author: Ed Greenwood
- Cover artist: Jon Sullivan
- Language: English
- Series: Shandril's Saga
- Genre: Fantasy novel
- Publisher: TSR
- Publication date: 1994
- Publication place: United States
- Media type: Print (Paperback)
- ISBN: 0-78693-619-3
- OCLC: 57895333
- Preceded by: Spellfire
- Followed by: Hand of Fire

Crown of Fire is a 1994 fantasy novel by Ed Greenwood. It is the second novel in Greenwood's book series, Shandril's Saga, and takes place in the Forgotten Realms setting based on the Dungeons & Dragons fantasy role-playing game.

== Plot summary ==
Shandril, who has risen from being a humble kitchen maid to being one of the most powerful magic users in the Realms, is now hunted by enemies who want to acquire her Spellfire ability. With her allies, Elminster, the Knights of Myth Drannor, and her lover Narn, she must face the dark magicians of Zhentarim and a group known as the Cult of the Dragon.

== Reception ==
One reviewer described it as "better than its predecessor, but not by much. Arguably stronger writing, more focus in the storytelling and the narrative doesn't drift as much."

== Reviews ==
- Kliatt
