= Game of the Pink Pagoda =

1986 novel by Roger Moss

Game of the Pink Pagoda is a novel by Roger Moss published in 1986.

== Plot summary ==
Game of the Pink Pagoda is a novel in which a game is featured.

== Reception ==
Dave Langford reviewed Game of the Pink Pagoda for White Dwarf #100, and stated that "Reminiscent of Calvino's If on a Winter's Night a Traveller, but Calvino's digressions followed a strict architecture while Moss's just seem to go on until the author gets tired. Enjoyable, though, and quite fun."

== Reviews ==
- Kliatt
