= Twilight War =

Twilight War may refer to:

- Winston Churchill's name for the Phoney War, the first phase of World War II
- A fictional war in the role playing game Twilight 2000
- A novel series in the Forgotten Realms setting by Paul S. Kemp
- A board game produced by SPI covering the resistance war in France during World War II
