= City of Fire (novel) =

2002 novel by T. H. Lain

- Cover of the first edition
- Author: T. H. Lain
- Language: English
- Genre: Fantasy novel
- Published: 2002 (Wizards of the Coast)
- Publication place: United States
- Media type: Print (Paperback)

City of Fire is a 2002 fantasy novel by T. H. Lain, based on the Dungeons & Dragons game.

== Summary ==
"In the sands of a great desert, a once-heroic paladin has turned to evil and enlisted an army of gnolls to help retrieve a powerful relic, reputed to be kept in the vaults of the city of Fire. If they find it, the world will never again be at peace."

A blackguard serving Hextor burns the city of Kalpesh, searching for a magical artifact. Some of the best soldiers of the city, led by a man named Tahlain, manage to escape the city, going out into the desert, but only a half-orc named Krusk knows of the real reason that Tahlain has led his troops out of the city. The blackguard manages to catch up with the soldiers, killing Tahlain, but not before the Captain manages to pass the artifact, a key into the city of fire, onto Krusk. The half-orc flees and for days starves and dehydrates until he is captured by a group of villagers.

A party of adventurers, returning from a raid on a group of orcs, manage to stop Krusk from being hanged, and he explains his mission to them. They go out into the desert, seeking to find the city of fire. However, they must first pass a series of challenges, while at the same time running from the gnolls. Eventually they manage to find their way into the city of fire, where they use the key to gain access. An azer, who guards the abandoned city, helps them prepare for the inevitable fight, and after the gnolls are defeated Krusk helps permanently seal the portal. A wizard named Naull who had been traveling with the party is nearly killed in the process, and the blackguard manages to capture her, teleporting her away to some unknown fate.

== Reviews ==
- Science Fiction Chronicle
