= The Titan of Twilight =

1995 novel by Troy Denning

- Cover of the first edition
- Author: Troy Denning
- Language: English
- Series: The Twilight Giants
- Genre: Fantasy novel
- Published: 1995
- Publication place: United States
- Media type: Print
- ISBN: 978-0-7869-0172-2 978-0-7869-3798-1

The Titan of Twilight is a fantasy novel by Troy Denning, set in the world of the Forgotten Realms, and based on the Dungeons & Dragons role-playing game. It is the third novel published in "The Twilight Giants" trilogy of novels. It was published in paperback in September 1995, with a paperback re-issue in October 2005.

== Plot summary ==
The Titan of Twilight is a novel in which the out of wedlock child born to Queen Brianna of Hartsvale leads to numerous deaths. The giants of the land believe the baby to be a Titan of Twilight, the last giant-kin descendant of Annam All-Father, creator of giant races. His coming is a prophecy the giant-kin believe, and they do everything they can so that Queen Brianna reaches the Twilight Vale. The child is supposedly to restore Ostoria, an ancient giant kingdom. The main protagonist, a firbolg by the name of Tavis Burdun and his friends fight to stop them.

== Reception ==
Gideon Kibblewhite reviewed The Titan of Twilight for Arcane magazine, rating it a 6 out of 10 overall. He calls the novel "An enjoyable romp" noting that "The body count is extraordinarily high, with expendable soldiers and leading characters on all sides meeting all manner of gruesome deaths. Indeed, this is one of the book's strengths. The story begins with a vicious battle and thereafter a steady shower of lopped limbs keeps things ticking along nicely." He comments that "Troy Denning has great fun dishing up a variety of tricky problems and hideous monsters for our heroes to tackle as events roll towards a stunning finale where the legendary titan himself makes an appearance." Kibblewhite concludes the review by saying "Not one for the faint-hearted (you'll never win a fair lady either) but for the rest of us an above-average read."

== Reviews ==
- Kliatt
