= Prophet of Moonshae =

2011 fantasy novel

Prophet of Moonshae is a fantasy novel by Douglas Niles, set in the world of the Forgotten Realms, and based on the Dungeons & Dragons game.

== Plot summary ==
Prophet of Moonshae is a novel in which King Tristan's daughters Alicia and Dierdre become involved a conflict in which the forces of the god Talos attempt to conquer their lands.

== Reviews ==
- Kliatt
- Backstab #9
