= T. H. Lain =

Pseudonym for authors of Dungeons & Dragons novels

T. H. Lain was a collective pseudonym used by nine separate authors writing under Wizards of the Coast's Dungeons & Dragons novels imprint.

According to Peter Archer, WotC's Director of Publishing, the decision to credit the Dungeons & Dragons novels to just one author was made to ensure they would be shelved together, as well as to spark a certain measure of curiosity and speculation as to T.H. Lain's identity. However, it was already obvious to many from the stylistic differences between volumes that Lain's output was the work of many authors rather than one. Nine authors had their work published using the T.H. Lain name.

== Authors ==
- Philip Athans, managing editor for Wizards of the Coast Book Publishing and editor of the Forgotten Realms novel line.
- Cory Herndon, a freelance writer and one-time editor of the Star Wars Roleplaying Game.
- Bruce R. Cordell, an RPG designer with TSR, Inc. and Wizards of the Coast.
- Ed Stark, design manager and creative director for the Dungeons & Dragons line.
- Johnny L. Wilson, writer for Computer Gaming World and co-author of High Score! The Illustrated History of Electronic Games.
- Nate Levine, a freelance writer.
- Murray J.D. Leeder, a freelance writer.
- Dave Gross, editor-in-chief for Star Wars Gamer and Star Wars Insider.
- Jess Lebow, an editor in the Wizards of the Coast Book Publishing department.

In addition, Steve Winter acted as line editor, starting with The Living Dead.

== Books ==
Ten books were published under the T.H. Lain pseudonym between July 2002 and December 2003, collectively following the exploits of the iconic characters of Dungeons & Dragons. The Savage Caves was the first in the series of novels featuring the iconic heroes of the Dungeons & Dragons role-playing game. The books in the series included:

- The Savage Caves - Philip Athans
- The Living Dead - Cory Herndon
- Oath of Nerull - Bruce Cordell
- City of Fire - Ed Stark
- The Bloody Eye - Johnny L. Wilson
- Treachery's Wake - Nate Levine
- Plague of Ice - Murray J.D. Leeder
- The Sundered Arms - Dave Gross
- Return of the Damned - Jess Lebow
- The Death Ray - Philip Athans
