= The Seven Sisters (role-playing game supplement) =

- Genre: Role-playing games
- Publisher: TSR
- Publication date: 1995
- Media type: Print

The Seven Sisters is an accessory for the 2nd edition of the Advanced Dungeons & Dragons fantasy role-playing game, written by Ed Greenwood and published in 1995 by TSR, Inc. as a 128-page book.

It details characters from the Forgotten Realms campaign setting: The Witch-Queen of Aglarond and her silver-haired siblings, high-level mages who dabble in immortality and troublemaking. The first section contains anecdotes, while the second half focuses on magic (sword and sorcery).

== Reception ==
Rick Swan reviewed The Seven Sisters for Dragon magazine #221 (September 1995). He observes that "Forgotten Realms godfather Ed Greenwood hosts this study" of the Seven Sisters. He notes that the first section is "rich in anecdotes [and] reads like excerpts from a good fantasy novel". Swan concludes by stating: "At 128 pages, the book may strike some as overkill. But if you make it to the end, you'll probably know more about the Sisters than you know about your own relatives."
