= Lord of Stormweather =

2003 novel by Dave Gross

- Cover of the first edition
- Author: Dave Gross
- Language: English
- Genre: Fantasy novel
- Published: 2003
- Publication place: United States
- Media type: Print (Paperback)
- ISBN: 978-0-7869-4786-7
- Preceded by: Sands of the Soul

Lord of Stormweather is a fantasy novel by Dave Gross, set in the world of the Forgotten Realms, and based on the Dungeons & Dragons role-playing game. It is the seventh and final novel in the "Sembia: Gateway To The Realms" series. It was published in paperback in March 2003.

== Plot summary ==
Thamalon Uskevren II, the heir to Stormweather Towers, must solve the disappearance of his parents and Erevis Cale.

== Reception ==
Critic Don D'Ammassa, noting that the Sembia series novels "seem generally more thoughtful" compared to novels based on other parts of the Wizards of the Coast universe, wrote that Lord of Stormweather is "a pretty good book".
