= Lies of Light =

2006 novel by Philip Athans

- Cover of the first edition
- Language: English
- Genre: Fantasy novel
- Published: 2006
- Publication place: United States
- Media type: Print (Paperback)
- ISBN: 978-0-7869-4019-6
- Preceded by: Whisper of Waves
- Followed by: Scream of Stone

Lies of Light is a fantasy novel by Philip Athans, set in the world of the Forgotten Realms, and based on the Dungeons & Dragons role-playing game. It is the second novel in "The Watercourse Trilogy". It was published in paperback in September 2006.

== Plot summary ==
Lies of Light is a novel in which a man is obsessed with accomplishing what he believes will be his greatest work.

== Reception ==
Pat Ferrara of mania.com comments: "Lies of Light continues where it's [sic] objectivism-laden series opener Whisper of Waves left off in 2005."
