= The Knights of Myth Drannor Trilogy =

21st century fantasy novel trilogy

The Knights of Myth Drannor is a novel trilogy written by Ed Greenwood, set in the Dungeons & Dragons Forgotten Realms setting. The books were published in 2006, 2007, and 2008 respectively.

== Plot summary ==
In Swords of Eveningstar, the Knights of Myth Drannor are a band of companions, the defenders of the Forgotten Realms. The Knights of Myth Drannor began in the village of Eveningstar, at the foot of the Stonelands, and adventured all over Faerûn, even obtaining a royal charter from King Azoun himself. This novel tells the tale of these adventurers for the first time.

In Swords of Dragonfire, the kingdom of Cormyr is in need of heroes, and the band of youthful adventurers known as the Knights of Myth Drannor answer that call.

In The Sword Never Sleeps, the Knights of Myth Drannor have earned praise from the Crown itself for their efforts, and save Cormyr.

== Novels ==
- Swords of Eveningstar (hardcover, August 2006, ISBN 978-0-7869-4022-6; paperback, June 2007, ISBN 978-0-7869-4272-5)
- Swords of Dragonfire (hardcover, August 2007, ISBN 978-0-7869-4339-5; paperback, April 2008, ISBN 978-0-7869-4862-8)
- The Sword Never Sleeps (hardcover, November 2008, ISBN 978-0-7869-4914-4)
