= City System =

Advanced Dungeons & Dragons accessory

- Author: Jeff Grubb with Ed Greenwood
- Genre: Role-playing game
- Publisher: TSR
- Publication date: 1988
- Media type: Boxed set

City System is an accessory for the Advanced Dungeons & Dragons fantasy role-playing game. It was written by Jeff Grubb and Ed Greenwood, and published in 1988 by TSR. It includes extensive and detailed maps of the city of Waterdeep, and was intended to serve as a companion to Waterdeep and the North. The sheer expanse of the maps drew praise from Ken Rolston of Dragon magazine, although he criticized their lack of personality and utility.

== Contents ==
City System contains ten large detailed color maps of the city of Waterdeep, with another map of the entire city, and another of the Castle Waterdeep interior.

The set includes fold-out maps, a booklet of essays, and presents a large city through numerous charts and tables. Ten of the twelve full-color fold-out maps fit together to depict a vast maze of streets, alleys, and rooftops, with over 200 numbered-keyed locations. The floor diagrams shown on the maps for some of the more notable locations are filled with schematic icons for tables, fireplaces, beds, trunks, barrels, lumber, and other standard features.

== Publication history ==
City System was written by Jeff Grubb and Ed Greenwood, with a cover by Larry Elmore, and maps by Dennis Kauth and Frey Graphics. It was published by TSR in 1988 as a boxed set with a 32-page booklet and 12 large color maps. The set includes full-color 22" × 34" maps. City System is intended to be a companion to Waterdeep and the North.

== Reception ==
Ken Rolston reviewed City System for Dragon magazine #156 (April 1990). He thought the title misleading, as it is not a system for designing or presenting fantasy role-playing cities: "If you're looking for guidance and support in designing and developing your own FRPG city settings, or for a stand-alone FRPG urban adventuring supplement, this is of no use to you." According to Rolston, the fold-out maps are "lovely" and the booklet with essays is useful, although the essays would have been more appropriately included in Waterdeep and the North, and the charts and tables are "of dubious utility". Rolston wrote that "the Waterdeep urban setting is more sprawling and less cohesive than the Greyhawk setting, and is somewhat less persuasive as a theater for real role-playing action". However, the sheer expanse of Waterdeep is "impressive, and the 12 full-color fold-out maps in City System are equally impressive", although "not particularly interesting, useful, or expressive of the setting", and "the Waterdeep birds-eye view hasn't got very much personality and isn’t so readily cross-referenced to keyed locations". Rolston concluded that anyone who owned and enjoyed Waterdeep and the North "ought to have this set; it’s not an inspirational model of game design, but the maps are big and colorful, and might be useful for Waterdeep campaigning". To those who want to run urban adventures in the Forgotten Realms and must choose between Waterdeep and the North and the more expensive City System, he said: "by all means the former is the better deal, and all you really need; City System is only a big, colorful, and unnecessary secondary accessory to Waterdeep and the North".

Lawrence Schick, in his 1991 book Heroic Worlds, writes that the ten city maps, when combined, "can cover an entire wall".

In a review of City System in Black Gate, Jeffrey Talanian said "You don't need a Ph.D. in Forgotten Realms to utilize this wonderful resource. I recommend it!"
