= Cryptych =

Cryptych was a bi-monthly magazine first published in July 1993 by ILM International Inc. It lasted eight issues.

== Description ==
Cryptych edited by JM White, featured articles on fantasy, speculative fiction and roleplaying games and interviews with writers and notable people in the games industry, including Ed Greenwood, RA Salvatore, Wes Craven, Terry Brooks, John Carpenter, Garth Ennis, William Gibson, Frederik Pohl, Dave Duncan, Dennis Muren, Jaron Lanier, and Richard Garfield. Original cover art included three works by NeNe Thomas. The magazine also included games company newsletters, including the Wizards of the Coast newsletter that contained some of the first information on Magic: The Gathering. Later issues of the magazine would contain extensive coverage of Magic: The Gathering.

Eight issues of Cryptych were published before the magazine folded in the fall of 1994.

== Reception ==
In the December 1994 edition of Dragon (Issue 212), Allen Varney found the magazine unfocussed, calling it "a fascinating mess — a lunar mountain range of articles, starkly uneven, weirdly arresting." Varney concluded "Anyone can find something worthwhile in this magazine, and it will certainly find a focus over time, but for now I find this brilliant hodgepodge quite cr — uh, baffling."
