= The Shattered Mask =

2001 novel by Richard Lee Byers

- Cover of the first edition
- Author: Richard Lee Byers
- Language: English
- Genre: Fantasy novel
- Published: 2001
- Publication place: United States
- Media type: Print (paperback)
- ISBN: 978-0-7869-1862-1 (first edition); 978-0-7869-4266-4 (reprint)
- Preceded by: Shadow's Witness
- Followed by: Black Wolf

The Shattered Mask is a fantasy novel by Richard Lee Byers, set in the world of the Forgotten Realms, and based on the Dungeons & Dragons role-playing game. It was published in paperback in June 2001, with a paperback reissue in July 2007.

== Plot summary ==
The Shattered Mask is a novel in which the matriarch of a Sembian family swears revenge for a murder in her family, while a power-hungry wizard uses his ability to alter reality for murder and destruction.

== Reception ==
In a positive review, critic Don D'Ammassa wrote, "Unlike many of the books set in this universe, this new one takes great pains to develop the characters".
