= Black Wolf (novel) =

2001 novel by Dave Gross

- Cover of the first edition
- Author: Dave Gross
- Language: English
- Genre: Fantasy novel
- Published: 2001
- Publication place: United States
- Media type: Print
- ISBN: 978-0-7869-1901-7
- Preceded by: The Shattered Mask
- Followed by: Heirs of Prophecy

Black Wolf is a fantasy novel by Dave Gross, set in the world of the Forgotten Realms, and based on the Dungeons & Dragons role-playing game. It is the fourth novel in the "Sembia: Gateway To The Realms" series. It was published in paperback in November 2001.

== Plot summary ==
Talbot Uskevren will need to use his sword fighting and acting skills to survive against the Black Brotherhood.

== Reception ==
In a mostly positive review, Don D'Ammassa opined that Gross's "prose is above average for this publisher, and his evocation of the culture of the imagined land is also quite well done."
