= Escape from Undermountain =

1996 novel by Mark Anthony

- Cover
- Author: Mark Anthony
- Language: English
- Series: "The Nobles"
- Genre: Fantasy novel
- Published: 1996
- Publication place: United States
- Media type: Print (Paperback)
- ISBN: 978-0-7869-0477-8

Escape from Undermountain is a fantasy novel by Mark Anthony, set in the world of the Forgotten Realms, and based on the Dungeons & Dragons role-playing game. It is the third novel published in the series "The Nobles". It was published in paperback, February 1996.

== Plot summary ==
Escape from Undermountain is a novel in which a half-orc must rescue a nobleman in Undermountain within 48-hours, using a small golden box which creates a magical gate to take them out of the monster-filled subterranean labyrinth. For rescuing the nobleman, all crimes that the rogue Artek Ar'talen the Knife has committed in the past will be pardoned. During the journey, he makes unlikely allies as they navigate the dangerous labyrinth made by mad wizard Halaster, trying to find a way out, before time runs out.

== Reception ==
Jonathan Palmer reviewed Escape from Undermountain for Arcane magazine, rating it a 6 out of 10 overall. He says of the story, "This is real Dungeons & Dragons" and feels that "Something inevitably has to go wrong." Palmer concludes the review by saying, "Mark Anthony writes to formula and what little plot there is he spells out early. That said, Escape is engaging and witty, so novices may find this Forgotten Realms novel a good introduction to the concepts of fantasy roleplaying."
