= Jaleigh Johnson =

American fantasy writer

Jaleigh Johnson is an American fantasy writer.

== Critical assessments ==
Johnson has been praised for her world building. Critics describe her characters as relatable and compelling. Her World of Solace series for young readers is described as "must have" for libraries. The Mark of the Dragonfly was listed on Bank Street College of Education's "Best Children's Books of the Year" for 2015 in the category of Fantasy, twelve to fourteen.

== Novels ==
=== Children's fiction ===
- The Door to the Lost (Delacorte Press, 2018)

==== World of Solace series ====
- The Mark of the Dragonfly (Delacorte Press, 2014)
- The Secrets of Solace (Delacorte Press, 2016)
- The Quest to the Uncharted Lands (Delacorte Press, 2017)

=== Licensed fiction ===
- Triptych (Aconyte Books, 2021)
- Assassin's Creed: The Golden City (Aconyte, 2023)

==== Dungeons & Dragons ====
- The Howling Delve (Wizards of the Coast, 2007)
- Mistshore (Wizards of the Coast, 2008)
  - Reprinted in Ed Greenwood Presents Waterdeep, Book I (Wizards of the Coast, 2011)
- Unbroken Chain (Wizards of the Coast, 2010)
- Unbroken Chain: the Darker Road (Wizards of the Coast, 2011)
- Spider and Stone (Wizards of the Coast, 2012)
- Dungeons & Dragons: Honor Among Thieves: The Road to Neverwinter (Random House Worlds, 2023)
- The Fallbacks: Bound for Ruin (Random House Worlds, 2024)
- The Fallbacks: Dealing with Dragons (Random House Worlds, 2025)

== Short fiction ==
- "Queen of the Mountain" in Realms of the Dragons II (Renton: Wizards of the Coast, 2005)
- "Your Fifteen Minutes" in School of X, edited by Gwendlyn Nix (Nottingham: Aconyte, 2022)
