= Whisper of Waves =

2005 novel by Philip Athans

- Cover of the first edition
- Author: Philip Athans
- Language: English
- Series: The Watercouse Trilogy
- Genre: Fantasy novel
- Published: 2005
- Publication place: United States
- Media type: Print (Paperback)
- ISBN: 978-0-7869-3837-7
- Followed by: Lies of Light

Whisper of Waves is a fantasy novel by Philip Athans, set in the world of the Forgotten Realms, and based on the Dungeons & Dragons role-playing game. It is the first novel in "The Watercouse Trilogy". It was published in paperback in November 2005.

== Plot summary ==
Whisper of Waves is a novel about a wizard who was pledged to the Red Wizards of Thay from boyhood, a genasi senator who has fought his way up from the streets, and a master builder who walks along the coast of Faerûn.

== Reception ==
In a mostly positive review, Don D'Ammassa wrote that the novel is "a fairly entertaining adventure".
