= War in Tethyr =

1995 novel by Victor Milán

- Cover of the first edition
- Author: Victor Milán
- Language: English
- Series: The Nobles
- Genre: Fantasy novel
- Published: 1995
- Publication place: United States
- Media type: Print
- ISBN: 978-0-7869-0184-5

War in Tethyr is a fantasy novel by Victor Milán, set in the world of the Forgotten Realms, and based on the Dungeons & Dragons role-playing game. It is the second novel published in The Nobles series, and was published in paperback in October, 1995.

== Plot summary ==
War in Tethyr is a novel in which a beautiful warrior leads a party of adventurers against her enemies, and unite the locals to their cause.

== Reception ==
Gideon Kibblewhite reviewed War in Tethyr for Arcane magazine, rating it a 2 out of 10 overall. He starts the review by saying: "Oh dear, oh dear. Victor Milan leaves almost no cliché unturned in this weak Forgotten Realms effort. From the book's corny beginning to its cheesy end, there is little of worth. A few background ideas may be found in its pages (there are a couple of good monsters, a take on body-snatching and some information about the city and people of Zazesspur) but you'll have to put up with an excruciating story." He criticizes the unoriginal plot, calling the heroes "The A Team with swords", and comments: "All the old veterans are wheeled out; a dwarf that mutters and tears at his beard, a half-elven bard with a voice like a golden bell, the list goes on..." Kibblewhite concludes the review by saying: "Game tie-in novels are hard to recommend when, like this one, all they supply is a dodgy story filled with constant references to how lithe, flat-bellied and supple the heroine is. There is a talking horse, though. Unfortunately, its name is Goldie and comes out with lines like 'I sense trouble ahead, Randi Star.'"
