= All Shadows Fled =

1995 novel by Ed Greenwood

- Cover of the first edition
- Author: Ed Greenwood
- Language: English
- Series: The Shadows of the Avatar
- Genre: Fantasy novel
- Published: 1995
- Publication place: United States
- Media type: Print
- ISBN: 978-0-7869-0302-3

All Shadows Fled is a fantasy novel by Ed Greenwood, set in the world of the Forgotten Realms, and based on the Dungeons & Dragons role-playing game. It is the third novel published in "The Shadows of the Avatar" trilogy of novels. It was published in paperback, October 1995, ISBN 978-0-7869-0302-3).

== Plot summary ==
All Shadows Fled is a novel in which the evil Malaugrym seek the destruction of Shadowdale before the Time of Troubles ends, while the inhabitants of the valley want the opportunity to remove this malevolent force from their lands.

== Reception ==
Jonathan Palmer reviewed All Shadows Fled for Arcane magazine, rating it a 7 out of 10 overall. He comments: "It's good against evil again in this, the third book in the Shadow of the Avatar trilogy, and good is kicking uphill." Palmer continues, "Both parties employ the tactic of infiltrating the house of their opponents with magic users, and the narrative switches pleasingly between the two viewpoints. Those who have followed the story so far will not want me to spoil it for them by telling who wins. Suffice to say that three heroes and a ghost, under the guidance of their archmage, and armed with a bagful of spells, a magical sword each and an abundance of scything wit, go from Shadowdale up to Shadowhome to effect the destruction of the Evil Empire, and have a marvellous time about it, too." He adds, "There are a few boring fireballs, some of which may be shapeshifters, but the author's imagination produces spell after wacky spell. Readers will recognise many of them; some will be new." Palmer concludes the review by saying, "So just as a source of spells, this book is worth the money. It's also well-written and abounds with gags and sarcastic backchat."
