= Erik Scott de Bie =

American novelist

- Born: July 18, 1983 (age 43)
- Education: Willamette University
- Occupations: Fiction writer; technical writer
- Writing career
- Language: English
- Period: 2005–present
- Genres: Fantasy
- Website: erikscottdebie.com

Erik Scott de Bie (born July 18, 1983) is an American fantasy author and technical writer who has authored several Forgotten Realms novels. He has a degree in English composition and literature from Willamette University in Oregon.

== Bibliography ==
=== Novel series ===
==== Forgotten Realms series ====
These titles are in the Forgotten Realms universe published through Wizards of the Coast.

- Ghostwalker (2005, ISBN 0-7869-3962-1, Wizards of the Coast)
- Depths of Madness (2007, ISBN 978-0-7869-4314-2, Wizards of the Coast)
- Downshadow (2009, ISBN 978-0-7869-5128-4, Wizards of the Coast)
- Shadowbane (2011, ISBN 978-0-7869-5855-9, Wizards of the Coast)
- Shadowbane: Eye of Justice (2012, ISBN 978-0-7869-6135-1, Wizards of the Coast)

==== Hellmaw series ====
- Blind Justice (2015, ISBN 978-1-77270-010-7, Hellmaw)

==== The World of Ruin ====
- Shadow of the Winter King (2014, ISBN 978-1-897492-77-2, Dragon Moon Press)
- Shield of the Summer Prince (2015, ISBN 978-1-897492-96-3, Dragon Moon Press)
- Mask of the Blood Queen (2017, ISBN 978-1-988256-61-0, Dragon Moon Press)
- Scourge of the Broken World (2021, ISBN 978-1-774000-31-1, Dragon Moon Press)

=== Standalone novels ===
- Scourge of the Realm (2014, ISBN 978-1-940372-11-2, Broken Eye Books)

=== Anthologies ===
These are anthologies edited by de Bie.

- Cobalt City Double Feature with Minerva Zimmerman (2012, ISBN 978-0-9830987-8-2, Timid Pirate Publishing)

=== Short works ===
- "The Hunting Game" in Realms of the Dragons II: The Year of Rogue Dragons (2005, ISBN 0-7869-3808-0, Wizards of the Coast)
- "Greater Treasure" in Realms of the Elves (2006, ISBN 0-7869-3980-X, Wizards of the Coast)
- "A Body in a Bag" in Realms of the Dead (2010, ISBN 978-0-7869-5363-9, Wizards of the Coast)
- "Racing Lights" in Close Encounters of the Urban Kind edited by Jennifer Brozek (2010, ISBN 978-0-9821596-9-9, Apex Publications)
- "Vengeance on the Layover" in Cobalt City Timeslip (2010, ISBN 978-0-615-40218-5, Timid Pirate Publishing)
- "Carnival Heart" with Nathan Crowder, Rosemary Jones, Dawn Vogel, and Jeremy Zimmerman in Cobalt City: Dark Carnival (2011, ISBN 978-0-9830987-6-8, Timid Pirate Publishing)
- "Desperate Housewolves" in Beast Within 2: Predator & Prey edited by Jennifer Brozek (2011, ISBN 978-0-9833141-2-7, Graveside Tales)
- "Doctor Circe and the Separatist Man-Cheetahs" in Growing Dread: Biopunk Visions edited by Caroline Dombrowski (2011, ISBN 978-0-9830987-4-4, Timid Pirate Publishing)
- "The Frigate Lieutenant's Woman" in Space Tramps edited by Jennifer Brozek (2011, ISBN 978-0-9845927-4-6, Flying Pen Press)
- "Funhouse" in Cobalt City: Dark Carnival (2011, ISBN 978-0-9830987-6-8, Timid Pirate Publishing)
- "Ten Thousand Cold Nights" in Human for a Day edited by Martin H. Greenberg and Jennifer Brozek (2011, ISBN 978-0-7564-0700-1, DAW Books)
- "Witch Fire" in Beauty Has Her Way edited by Jennifer Brozek (2011, ISBN 978-0-9830993-1-4, Dark Quest Books)
- "Eye for an Eye" in Cobalt City Double Feature (2012, ISBN 978-0-9830987-8-2, Timid Pirate Publishing)
- "Hunger of the Blood Reaver" in When the Villain Comes Home edited by Ed Greenwood and Gabrielle Harbowy (2012, ISBN 978-1-897492-49-9, Dragon Moon Press)
- "Curse of the Bambino" in This Mutant Life: Bad Company edited by Ben Langdon (2013, ISBN 978-0-9875308-2-0, Kalamity Press)
- "Incubus Nickel" in Coins of Chaos edited by Jennifer Brozek (2013, ISBN 978-1-77053-048-5, Edge Science Fiction and Fantasy)
- "Judgment" in Called to Battle Volume One (2013, ISBN 978-1-939480-43-9, Privateer Press)
- "Before Death, Retribution" in Iron Kingdoms Excursions Season One Volume Six (2014, ISBN 978-1-939480-71-2, Privateer Press)
- "Dr. Circe and the Shadow over Swedish Innsmouth" in That Ain't Right: Historical Accounts of the Miskatonic Valley edited by Dawn Vogel and Jeremy Zimmerman (2014, ISBN 978-0-692-27021-9, DefConOne Publishing)
- "Shell Shock" in Iron Kingdoms Excursions Season Two Volume Three (2015, ISBN 978-1-939480-82-8, Privateer Press)
- "King's Shield" in Women in Practical Armor (2016, ISBN 978-1-940154-13-8, Evil Girlfriend Media)
