= Richard Lee Byers =

American author

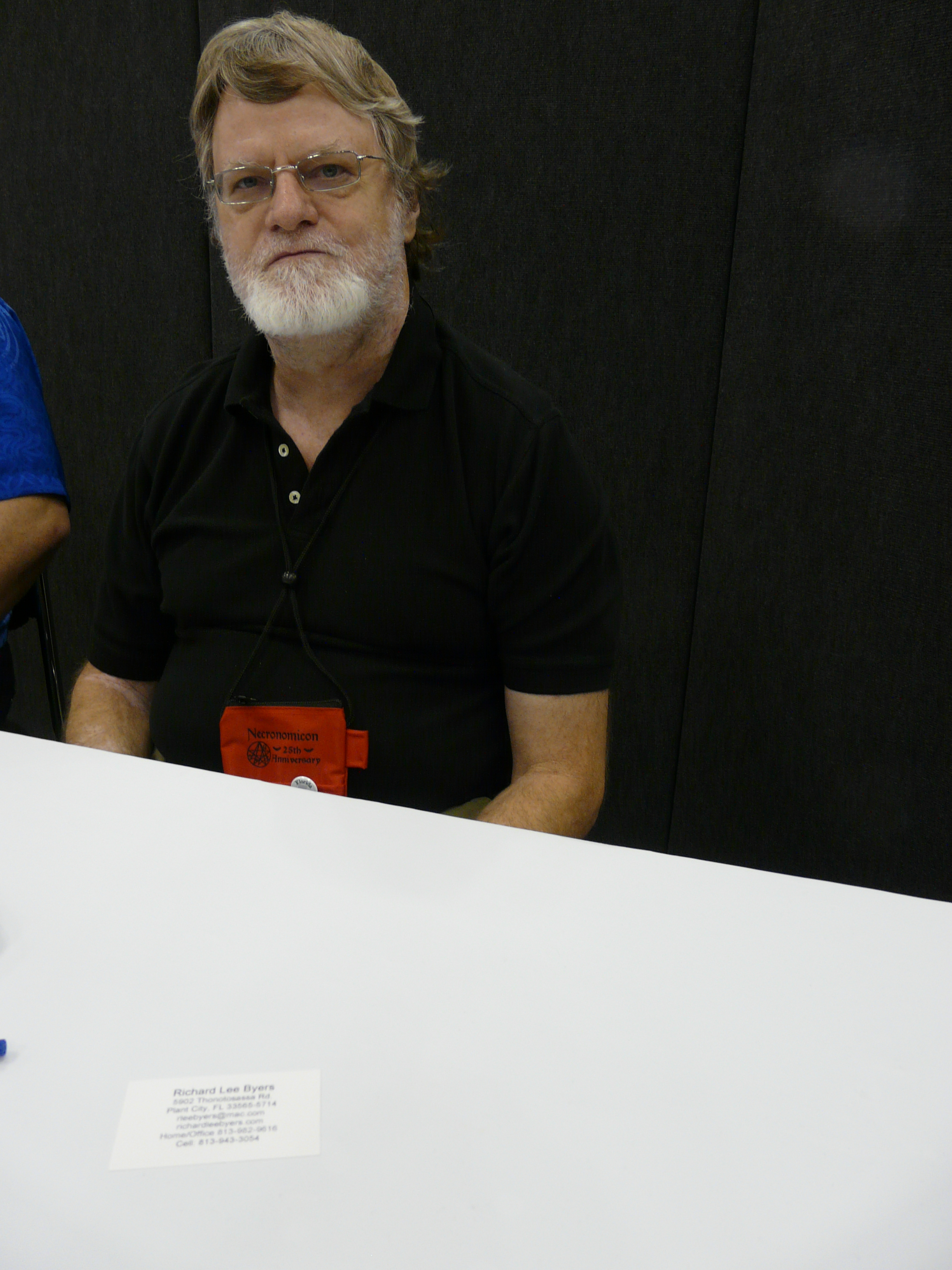
- Richard Lee Byers at Gen Con Indy 2008
- Born: Richard Lee Byers; Columbus, Ohio, U.S.
- Occupation: Novelist

Richard Lee Byers is an American author of fantasy novels.

== Biography ==
Richard Lee Byers holds a master's degree in psychology. A resident of the Tampa Bay area, he worked in an emergency psychiatric facility for over a decade, then left the mental health field to become a writer. He has taught fiction writing at Hillsborough Community College. He is also a fencing and poker enthusiast. He is the author of over forty fantasy and horror novels, including many set in the Forgotten Realms universe. His recent projects include the eBook superhero series The Impostor.

Byers has also written for League Entertainment's comic book series Simon Vector, with illustrator Johnny Atomic.

== Bibliography ==
- The Vampire's Apprentice (January 1992)
- Forbidden (February 2003)

=== Forgotten Realms ===
- The Halls of Stormweather (July 2000)
- The Shattered Mask (June 2001)
- Dissolution (July 2002)
- The Black Bouquet (September 2003)
- The Year of Rogue Dragons trilogy
  - The Rage (April 2004)
  - The Rite (January 2005)
  - The Ruin (May 2006)
- Queen of the Depths (August 2005)
- The Haunted Lands trilogy
  - Unclean (April 2007)
  - Undead (March 2008)
  - Unholy (early 2009)
- Brotherhood of the Griffon
  - The Captive Flame (April 2010)
  - Whisper of Venom (November 2010)
  - The Spectral Blaze (June 2011)
  - The Masked Witches (February 2012)
  - Prophet of the Dead (February 2013)
- The Sundering
  - The Reaver (2013)
