= Ed Greenwood =

Canadian fantasy writer and game designer

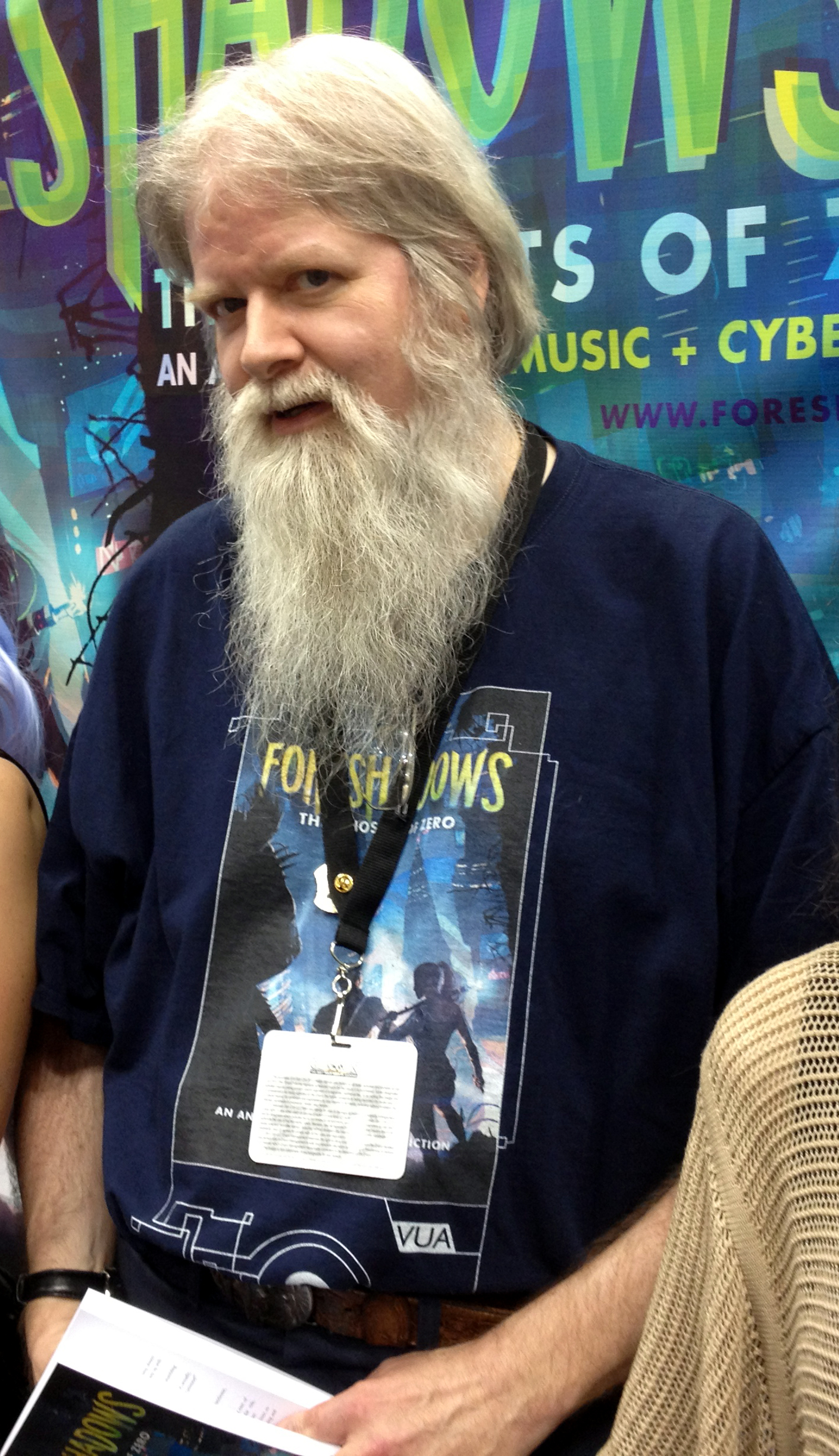
- Greenwood at Gen Con Indy 2012
- Born: July 21, 1959 (age 67)
- Occupations: Writer, game designer
- Writing career
- Period: 1979–present
- Genres: Role-playing games, fantasy

Ed Greenwood (born July 21, 1959) is a Canadian fantasy writer and the creator of the Forgotten Realms game world. He began writing articles about the Forgotten Realms for Dragon magazine beginning in 1979, and subsequently sold the rights to the setting to TSR, the creators of the Dungeons & Dragons roleplaying game, in 1986. He has written many Forgotten Realms novels, as well as numerous articles and D&D game supplement books.

== Early life and the Forgotten Realms ==
Greenwood grew up in the Toronto neighbourhood of Don Mills. He began writing stories about the Forgotten Realms as a child, starting in the mid-1960s; they were his "dream space for swords and sorcery stories". Greenwood conceived of the Forgotten Realms as one world in a "multiverse" of parallel worlds which includes the Earth; he imagined such worlds as being the source of humanity's myths and legends.

Greenwood discovered the Dungeons & Dragons game in 1975 and soon became a regular player. He used the Realms as a setting for his campaigns, which centred on the fictional locales of Waterdeep and Shadowdale, locations that would figure prominently in his later writing. According to Greenwood, his players' thirst for detail pushed him to further develop the Forgotten Realms setting: "They want[ed] it to seem real, and work on 'honest jobs' and personal activities, until the whole thing [grew] into far more than a casual campaign."

Beginning with the periodical's 30th issue in 1979, Greenwood published a series of articles set in the Realms in The Dragon magazine, the first of which was about a monster known as The Curst. Greenwood's articles in The Dragon often featured the wizard Elminster describing magic items, monsters, and spells.

== Partnership with TSR ==
In 1986, the American game publishing company TSR began looking for a new campaign setting for the Advanced Dungeons & Dragons game, and assigned Jeff Grubb to find out more about the setting used by Greenwood in his articles for Dragon magazine. According to Greenwood, Grubb asked him "Do you just make this stuff up as you go, or do you really have a huge campaign world?"; he answered "yes" to both questions. TSR felt that the Forgotten Realms would be a more open-ended setting than the epic Dragonlance setting, and chose the Realms as a ready-made campaign for AD&D 2nd Edition.

Greenwood agreed to work on the project, and began to prepare his Forgotten Realms material for official publication. He sent TSR a few dozen cardboard boxes stuffed with pencil notes and maps, and sold all his rights to the Realms to TSR for a token fee—just $5,000 and a promise to publish Greenwood's novels. The following year, Greenwood and coauthor Jeff Grubb wrote and published the Forgotten Realms Campaign Set (1987).

The campaign setting was a major success, and Greenwood continued to be involved with the evolution of the Forgotten Realms over the next decades. He went on to write numerous Forgotten Realms novels. Many of these center around the wizard Elminster, whom Greenwood has frequently portrayed at conventions and gaming events.

When TSR was in dire financial difficulties in 1996–1997, Greenwood offered to write some material for them for free to help get them back on their feet. Nothing came of the offer, but after Wizards of the Coast purchased TSR in 1997 and stabilized its finances, CEO Peter Adkison personally called Greenwood at the library he was working at to encourage him to continue writing Realms material. Greenwood responded he was happy to continue writing for the Realms for as long as he could.

Greenwood feels his work on the Realms that he likes best are "those products that impart some of the richness and color of the Realms, such as the novel I wrote with Jeff Grubb, Cormyr; the Volo's Guides; Seven Sisters; The Code of the Harpers; City of Splendors; and stuff that lots of gamers have found useful, such as Drow of the Underdark and Ruins of Undermountain."

Greenwood has also been contributing editor and creative editor of Dragon magazine.

== Personal life and other activities ==
Greenwood has published over two hundred articles in Dragon Magazine and Polyhedron Newszine, is a lifetime charter member of the Role Playing Game Association (RPGA) network, and has been a Gen Con Game Fair guest of honor many times. Greenwood has written over thirty-five novels for TSR, and written, co-written, or contributed to over two hundred books and game products from other publishers. Greenwood has also contributed to The Book of All Flesh (2001), an anthology based on All Flesh Must Be Eaten, and written short stories based on the Silver Age Sentinels role-playing game. Greenwood's Castlemourn fantasy setting was published by Margaret Weis Productions. He is co-creator (with fantasy novelist Lynn Abbey) of the Mornmist fantasy setting.

He has also contributed to most Forgotten Realms gaming accessories, and authored many more—including the detailed Volo's Guide series—and continues to DM his own campaign. He writes regular Realmslore columns for the Wizards of the Coast website.

In addition to all these activities, Greenwood works as a library clerk (and sometimes as a librarian) and has edited over a dozen small press magazines. When not appearing at conventions, he lives in an old farmhouse in the countryside of Ontario.

As of 1998, Greenwood lived in applegrowing country on Lake Ontario, still working full-time at the North York Community Library, as he had since 1974, and continued to run his original Waterdeep campaign with the same core group he started with, albeit meeting only sporadically.

=== Castlemourn ===
Castlemourn is a campaign setting by Greenwood for Dungeons & Dragons. Margaret Weis Productions introduced the setting to publication with A Player's Guide to Castlemourn (2006), followed by the d20-based Castlemourn Campaign Setting (2007), after which the company released the Castlemourn Cortex System Quickstart (2008) as part of the second Free RPG Day before closing down the line.

==== Setting ====
Castlemourn is a land searching for its past. Its people are unaware of their origins, the greatness of their history, or what disaster brought about the Dark Age that has engulfed the land. Some three hundred years before the setting's current era, there existed a magical place of shining towers and marvelous wonders called the Realm of Castles. Legends tell of a great war against fell creatures that destroyed the realm, leaving scorched ruins and crumbling citadels. Whatever befell this realm was so terrible that the gods have "cordoned" it off. No one is permitted to leave Castlemourn and those who find their way there, do so at their own peril, as adventurers, treasure hunters, and questors scour the land searching for relics, artifacts, and clues to their past. Castlemourn is a post-apocalyptic fantasy setting where kingdoms fight for power through political intrigue and outright warfare; where the brave seek their fortunes in dangerous ruins, and where everyone fears the unspeakable evil that shadows their land.

==== Races ====
In Castlemourn, one can find almost all of the core races, except half-orc. However, their base abilities all changed in some ways.

- Dwarves: Dwarves are a stout miner race, just like in the core settings. However, they perceive the world as an illusion, so they are more prone to be affected by illusions, but can ignore real dangers, as if they were only illusions.
- Elves: Elves are lithe creatures of the woods, who glow with light, and therefore hardly can hide from others.
- Half-Elves: Just like their elven ancestors, they glow, but with a dimmer light.
- Halflings: Small people, who are the masters of forging magical items.
- Gnomes: Gnomes are little humanoids, who swore to commit a great task in their lives.
- Godaunts: Fell beasts, who are looked down by other races. They are the equivalent of the half-orc.
- Thaele: Vampire-like mysterious race.

==== Classes ====
There is only one extra class beside the core classes of D&D: the buccaneer. The buccaneers are pirates, seafaring swashbucklers. There are six prestige classes as well: dusked, faithless one, rhymesword, servant of the Seven, truesword knight and waymaster.

== Awards and honors ==
Greenwood won "best player" at the 1984 Gen Con AD&D Open tournament and several Gamer's Choice Awards and Origins Awards for his game design. He was inducted into the Gamer's Choice Hall of Fame in 1992 and the Academy of Adventure Gaming's Hall of Fame in 2003. Order of Cramahe 2017. He received the Port Hope Civic Awards Arts & Culture Award 2019. He was inducted into the Canadian Science Fiction and Fantasy Association Hall of Fame in 2022.

== Bibliography ==
- Shandril's Saga
  - Spellfire (1987)
  - Crown of Fire (1994, also part of The Harpers)
  - Hand of Fire (2002)
- The Elminster Series
  - Elminster – The Making of a Mage (1994)
  - Elminster in Myth Drannor (1997)
  - The Temptation of Elminster (1998)
  - Elminster in Hell (2001)
  - Elminster's Daughter (2004)
  - Elminster Must Die (August 2010)
  - Bury Elminster Deep (August 2011)
  - Elminster Enraged (August 2012)
  - The Herald (2014, also part of The Sundering)
  - Spellstorm (2015)
  - Death Masks (2016)
- The Shadow of the Avatar Trilogy
  - Shadows of Doom (1995)
  - Cloak of Shadows (1995)
  - All Shadows Fled (1995)
- The Cormyr Saga
  - Cormyr: A Novel (with Jeff Grubb, 1996)
  - Death of the Dragon (with Troy Denning, 2000)
- The Harpers
  - Stormlight (1996)
- Double Diamond Triangle Saga
  - The Mercenaries (1998)
  - The Diamond (1998)
- Sembia: Gateway to the Realms
  - "The Burning Chalice" - The Halls of Stormweather: A Novel In Seven Parts (2000)
- The Knights of Myth Drannor Trilogy
  - Swords of Eveningstar (2006);
  - Swords of Dragonfire (August 2007)
  - The Sword Never Sleeps (November 2008)
- Other titles
  - Silverfall: Stories of the Seven Sisters (1999)
  - The City of Splendors: A Waterdeep Novel (with Elaine Cunningham, 2005)

=== Anthology novellas ===
- "One Comes Unheralded, to Zirta" - originally written in 1967, published in Best of the Realms 2 (2005)
- "Elminster at the Mage Fair" - Realms of Valor (1993)
- "So High A Price" - Realms of Infamy (1994)
- "The Eye of the Dragon" - Realms of Magic (1995)
- "A Slow Day In Skullport" - Realms of the Underdark (1996)
- "The Whispering Crown" - Realms of the Arcane (1997)
- "The Place Where Guards Snore at their Posts" - Realms of the Deep (2000)
- "When Shadows Come Seeking A Throne" - Realms of Shadow (2002)
- "The Keeper of Secrets" - Realms of the Dragons (2004)
- "Tears so White" - Realms of the Elves (2006)
- "Too Many Princes" - Realms of War (2008)
- "The Many Murders of Manshoon" - Realms of the Dead (2010)
- "Lord of the Darkways" - Untold Adventures (2011)

=== Non-Forgotten Realms novels ===
- Band of Four Series
  - The Kingless Land (Tor Books 2000)
  - The Vacant Throne (Tor Books 2001)
  - A Dragon's Ascension (Tor Books 2002)
  - The Dragon's Doom (Tor Books 2003)
  - The Silent House: A Chronicle of Aglirta (Tor Books 2004)
- Falconfar Series
  - Dark Lord (Solaris Books 2007)
  - Arch Wizard (Solaris Books 2008)
  - Falconfar (Solaris Books 2010)
- Novel of Niflheim Series
  - Dark Warrior Rising: A Novel of Niflheim (Tor Books 2007)
  - Dark Vengeance (Tor Books 2008)
- Pathfinder Tales Series
  - The Wizard's Mask (Paizo Publishing 2013)
- The Iron Assassin (Tor Books 2015)
- Hellmaw Series
  - Hellmaw: Your World Is Doomed! (The Ed Greenwood Group 2016)
  - Hellmaw: Throckmorton's Trick (The Ed Greenwood Group 2017)
  - Hellmaw: My Talons In Her Throat (The Ed Greenwood Group 2017)
- Stormtalons Series
  - Words Of Unbinding (The Ed Greenwood Group 2016)
- Folklore: The Affliction Series
  - Folklore: The Affliction: The Whispering Skull (The Ed Greenwood Group 2017)
- Come Octember (Haunted Castle Press 2018)

=== Other fiction anthology contributions ===
- "The Sword of Dreams" - Tales From Tethedril (1998)
- "The Witch of the Dawn" - Be Afraid! (2000)
- "The Shadow of a Sword" - The Doom of Camelot (2000)
- "One Last, Little Revenge" - The Book of All Flesh (2001)
- "Writhe, Damn You" - Northern Horror (2002)
- "No Stars to Steer By" - Oceans of Space (2002)
- "All One Under the Stars" - The Bakka Anthology (2002)
- "O Silent Knight of Cards" - Be Very Afraid! (2002)
- "The Secret in the Cellar" - The Book of Final Flesh (2003)
- "The Man In The Wall" - Path of the Just (2003)
- "The Fallen Star" - Children of the Rune (2004)
- "Stormsong" - Summoned by Destiny I: Realms of Wonder (2004)
- "The Mad Mohj of Onteth" - The Dragons' Return (2005)
- "Wrathclaw's Wyrmtide" - We Three Dragons (2005)
- "Beowulf and the Wraith" - The Further Adventures of Beowulf: Champion of Middle Earth (2006)
- "It Came From the Swamp" - Astounding Hero Tales (2006)
- "Oroon Rising" - Wizards of the Coast (2006)
- "King Harrowhelm" - Heroes in Training (2007)
- "Secrets" - Dragons of Krynn (2007)
- "Father Maims Best" - Catopolis (2008)
- "What Dreams May Go" - Lilith Unbound (2008)
- "How Fear Came To Ornath" - Worlds of Their Own (2008)
- "A Perfect Night to Watch Detroit Burn" - Grants Pass (2009)
- "Rescuing the Elf Princess Again" - Gamer Fantastic (2009)
- "Edge of Moonglow" - Tesseracts Fifteen: A Case of Quite Curious Tales (2011)
- "Biting a Dead Man's Hand" - First Contact: Digital Science Fiction Anthology 1 (2011)
- "My Silent Slayer" - Heir Apparent: Digital Science Fiction Anthology 4 (2011)
- "Daggers in her Garters" - Beauty Has Her Way (Dark Quest Books) (2011)
- "Best Served Flash-Frozen" - Foreshadows: The Ghosts of Zero (2012)
- "Midnight Knight" - The New Hero (2012)
- "A Girl and Her Scaly Bits" - The Awakened (2013)
- "Fae Blades for the Dread Duke" - By Faerie Light (2013)
- "A Matter of Knives" - Pathfinder Tales (2013)
- "Kheltae's Bright Scheme" - Tournament of Death (2014)
- "The Sword of the Lord" - Arcane Synthesis (2014)
- "Ghosts Galore" - Cadaver Bone (2014)
- "The Dragon" - Gods, Memes, and Monsters (2015)
- "The Magpie" - Gods, Memes, and Monsters (2015)
- "The Haunting of the Lordly Lion" - The Bard's Tale: Stories and Recipes From The Black Dragon Inn (2015)
- "Many Tentacles, Reaching" - The Awakened II (2016)
- "My Doom May Come Soon" - Champions of Aetaltis (2016)
- "Wolves Run By Night" - The Awakened Modern (2017)
- "Under the Queen's Throne" - Art of War (2018)
- "Three Aces for the Dancer" - Rocket Age Anthology 1: Tales of the Solar System (2018)
- "Words to Die For" - Sisterhood of the Blade (2018)
- "Creatures from Fairy-Tale and Myth" (2019)

=== Anthologies edited ===
- When the Hero Comes Home (edited by Ed Greenwood and Gabrielle Harbowy) – Dragon Moon Press (2011)
- When the Villain Comes Home (edited by Ed Greenwood and Gabrielle Harbowy) – Dragon Moon Press (2012)
- Women In Practical Armor (edited by Ed Greenwood and Gabrielle Harbowy) – Evil Girlfriend Media (2017)

=== Role-playing games ===
- 1st edition Dungeons & Dragons
  - Forgotten Realms Campaign Set (1987), a box set of material for running Dungeons & Dragons campaigns set in the Realms; since re-published various times for new editions.
  - City System (1988), an extensive collection of maps of the city of Waterdeep.
- 2nd edition Advanced Dungeons & Dragons
  - Haunted Halls of Eveningstar
  - Lost Ships (1991), supplement for Spelljammer campaign setting.
- 5th Edition Dungeons & Dragons
  - The Border Kingdoms: A Forgotten Realms Campaign Supplement with Alex Kammer (Dungeon Masters Guild, June 2018)
  - Elminster's Candlekeep Companion with Anthony Joyce, Justice Arman, M.T. Black, Jeremy Forbing, Trevor Armstrong, Laura Hirsbrunner (Dungeon Masters Guild, April 2020)
  - Darkhold: Secrets of the Zhentarim with Justice Arman, M.T. Black, Anthony Joyce, Celeste Conowitch, Jeremy Forbing, Sadie Lowry, Noah Grand, Brittney Hay, Gabriel Hicks, Laura Hirsbrunner, Amber Litke, Jessica Marcrum, Kienna Shaw (Dungeon Masters Guild, August 2020)
  - Rashemen - Campaign Guide with Joe Raso, Andrew Bishkinskyi, Blaise Wigglesworth, Bryan Holmes, Emily Harmon, Florian Emmerich, Jean Lorber, Karl Resch, Lydia Van Hoy, Steve Fidler, V.J. Harris (Dungeon Masters Guild, September 2021)
  - Thay: Land Of The Red Wizards with Alex Kammer, Alan Patrick (Dungeon Masters Guild, February 2022)

=== Video games ===
- J.R.R. Tolkien's The Lord of the Rings, Vol. II: The Two Towers
- Eye of the Beholder III: Assault on Myth Drannor
- Pool of Radiance: Ruins of Myth Drannor
- Mages of Mystralia

=== Critical studies and reviews of Greenwood's work ===
The Iron Assassin

- Sakers, Don (July–August 2015). "The Reference Library". Analog Science Fiction and Fact. 135 (7&8): 185–188.

== Media mentions ==
Ed Greenwood has appeared in the following podcasts, newspaper and magazine articles, websites, and podcasts.

=== Podcasts ===
- Open Design No. 004: Dwarves of the Ironcrags. Ed provides the voice for the introduction to this show.
- RPG Countdown: 29 July 2009 episode (Kobold Quarterly 010)
- Dungeon Masters Block: Episode 69 & 70
- Worldcasting: Episode 12 (by Worldbuilding Magazine)
- A Role to Play: The Patron Saint of RPGs: Episodes 4, 5, 6
- Epic Realms Podcast - Multiple Episodes

=== Magazines ===
- "To Believe the Magic Is Real: A Conversation with Ed Greenwood". Clarkesworld Magazine, December 2008.
- Interview with Ed Greenwood, Cryptych Issue 1/IV, February 1994 ISBN 1-883773-03-2

=== Radio interviews ===
- Sounds Like Canada: August 28, 2007 episode
