= Philip Athans =

American editor and author

- Born: 1964 (age 61–62); Rochester, New York, U.S.
- Occupations: Editor; author

Philip Athans (born 1964 in Rochester, New York) is an American editor and author.

== Biography ==
Philip Athans was born in 1964 in Rochester, New York, but was raised in Chicago. Athans grew up reading Marvel comics and Starlog magazines, and watching Star Trek. He graduated from film school in 1985 and started small circulation literary magazine called Alternative Fiction & Poetry.

Athans was taken on in the book publishing department of TSR in 1995 when J. Robert King resigned from his full-time position as editor, and Athans stayed on through the 1997 transition to Wizards of the Coast. Athans became Senior Managing Editor for Wizards of the Coast Book Publishing, where he spent most of his time as the Forgotten Realms novel line editor. There he edited dozens of anthologies (such as Realms of War in 2008) and novels, and continued to write his own, and helped launch the Greyhawk, Dark Matter, Star*Drive, and Dungeons & Dragons novel lines. He wrote a number of Forgotten Realms books such as Annihilation in 2004.

After leaving Wizards of the Coast in 2010, he formed Athans & Associates Creative Consulting, working with dozens of author and publisher clients including Pixar Animation Studios and Amazon/57 North.

Athans is also known as a writing teacher, having written three books on the art and craft of genre writing, as well as numerous online tutorials via Writer's Digest. His own weekly blog, Fantasy Author's Handbook, has been running continuously since June 2009 and now includes a YouTube channel and GoodReads group.

== Partial bibliography ==
The Best of Fantasy Author's Handbook, Volume I, 2009-2013 (2021)

Writing Monsters (Writer's Digest Books, 2014)

The Guide to Writing Fantasy and Science Fiction (Adams Media, 2010)

Completely Broken (2011)

=== Forgotten Realms: The Legend of Drizzt ===
- A Reader's Guide to R.A. Salvatore's the Legend of Drizzt (2008)

=== Forgotten Realms: The Watercourse Trilogy ===
- Whisper of Waves (2005)
- Lies of Light (2006)
- Scream of Stone (2007)

=== Forgotten Realms: War of the Spider Queen series ===
- Annihilation (2004)

=== Forgotten Realms: Baldur's Gate series ===
- Baldur's Gate (1999)
- Baldur's Gate 2: The Shadows of Amn (2000)

=== Dungeons & Dragons novels ===
- The Savage Caves (under the pseudonym T.H. Lain) (2002)
- The Death Ray (under the pseudonym T.H. Lain) (2003)

=== Dark Matter novels ===
- In Fluid Silence (under the pseudonym G.W. Tirpa) (2000)
