= Dave Gross =

American novelist

- Occupation: Game designer

Dave Gross (/ɡroʊs/) is a game designer who has worked primarily on role-playing games.

He is also a magazine editor, and has held the position of Editor-in-Chief at Star Wars Insider and at Amazing Stories.

== Career ==
Dave Gross, Michael Mikaelian, and Vic Wertz managed the Star Wars Insider magazine after Paizo Publishing gained the magazine publishing license from Wizards of the Coast in 2002. Paizo began their Pathfinder Tales line with the novel Prince of Wolves (2010) by Gross. Other novels by Gross in the line include Master of Devils, Queen of Thorns, King of Chaos, and Lord of Runes.

Gross came to work at Beamdog as lead writer for Baldur's Gate: Enhanced Edition in 2012.

His novels include Forgotten Realms novels Black Wolf (2001), and Lord of Stormweather (2003).
