= Kliatt =

Bimonthly magazine

- Editor: Claire Rosser
- Editor: Paula Rohrlick
- Editor: Jean Palmer
- Frequency: Bimonthly
- Total circulation: 2,300 (2004)
- First issue: 1967
- Final issue: November 2008
- Country: United States
- Based in: Wellesley, Massachusetts
- Language: English
- ISSN: 1065-8602

Kliatt (stylized as KLIATT) was a bimonthly magazine that published reviews of young adult literature. It also published reviews of related media, such as educational software, designed for teachers and librarians interested in promoting reading among young adults. Each issue included a featured article. The magazine was established in 1967 and published its final issue in November 2008. In 2004, it had a circulation of 2,300.
