= Pool of Radiance (series) =

Series of role-playing video games

- The early 2000s version of the logo
- Genre: Tactical role-playing game
- Developers: Strategic Simulations, Inc. Stormfront Studios
- Publishers: Strategic Simulations, Inc. Pony Canyon (Japan); Ubisoft
- Platforms: Amiga, Apple II, C64, MS-DOS, Apple Macintosh, NES, PC-9800, Atari ST, Windows
- First release: Pool of Radiance; June 1988
- Latest release: Ruins of Myth Drannor; September 25 2001
- Parent series: Gold Box

Pool of Radiance is a series of role-playing video games set in the Forgotten Realms campaign settings of Dungeons & Dragons. There are five games in the series, of which the first four are Gold Box titles. These are based on the Advanced Dungeons & Dragons rules, and were the first video games to use this rule set. The final game, Ruins of Myth Drannor, was developed by Stormfront Studios after a ten year hiatus and is a significant departure from the established style. The game was also the first to use 3rd edition rules.

The series reached combined global sales above 800,000 units by 1996.

== Development ==
Release timeline Main series in bold
1988	Pool of Radiance
1989	Curse of the Azure Bonds
1990	Secret of the Silver Blades
1991	Pools of Darkness
1992
1993
1994
1995
1996
1997
1998
1999
2000
2001	Ruins of Myth Drannor

All five games were developed under a license deal TSR, Inc. conducted with SSI in the late 1980s. TSR were approached by Electronic Arts, who had intentions of developing a similar title several weeks before SSI spoke with the company. However, TSR chose SSI to develop the games on account of the passion for the tabletop game shared by Chuck Kroegel and his team. More broadly, SSI had a good reputation for RPG development and EA was then a fairly new company. The section of the Forgotten Realms world in which Pool of Radiance takes place was intended to be developed only by SSI.

=== Gold Box titles (1988-1991) ===
The first game was created on Apple II and Commodore 64 computers, taking one year with a team of thirty-five people. This game was the first to use the game engine later used in other SSI D&D games known as the "Gold Box" series. The SSI team developing the game was led by Chuck Kroegel. Kroegel said that the main challenge with the development was interpreting the AD&D rules to an exact format. Developers also worked to balance the graphics with gameplay to provide a faithful AD&D feel, given the restrictions of a home computer. The game was originally programmed by Keith Brors and Brad Myers, and was developed by George MacDonald. The game's graphic arts were by Tom Wahl, Fred Butts, Darla Marasco, and Susan Halbleib.

Pool of Radiance was released in June 1988; it was initially available on the Commodore 64, Apple II, and IBM PC compatibles. A version for the Atari ST was also announced. The Macintosh version was released in 1989. The Macintosh version featured a slightly different interface and was intended to work on black-and-white Macs like the Mac Plus and the Mac Classic. The game's Amiga version was released two years later. The PC 9800 version 『プール・オブ・レイディアンス』in Japan was fully translated (like the Japanese Famicom version) and featured full-color graphics. The game was ported to the Nintendo Entertainment System under the title Advanced Dungeons & Dragons: Pool of Radiance, released in April 1992.

Curse of the Azure Bonds (1989) was the first of three sequels to Pool of Radiance (1988), and was followed by Secret of the Silver Blades (1990) and Pools of Darkness (1991). Each of these by and large maintained the format established by the first game. Curse of the Azure Bonds was closely tied to an AD&D game module and a Forgotten Realms novel by the same name and the adventure module Curse of the Azure Bonds is based on the computer game. Some minor technical or design changes followed in the later titles, with Secret of the SIlver Blades eschewing an overworld map, and Pools of Darkness adopting VGA 256 colors over the more limited 16 color pallette seen in the earlier games.

=== Pool of Radiance: Ruins of Myth Drannor (2001) ===
SSI produced several other Gold Box titles in the mid 1990s, but their focus on the older engine led to financial losses as their work began to appear dated. The company was sold to Mindscape in 1994. After some time under Mattel, the group was purchased by Ubisoft. The move meant that the Pools of Radiance license now rested with the larger company, which would use this to release the fifth and final title, Pool of Radiance: Ruins of Myth Drannor. The game is not a sequel to any of the classic titles, but is instead connected only by the setting and title. A third edition tabletop module, Pool of Radiance: Attack on Myth Drannor, was released earlier that year as a tie-in to the game. It was intended to be played alongside Ruins of Myth Drannor, but could also be played as a standalone module.

No further titles were developed in the Pool of Radiance franchise, however Stormfront did go on to develop one further game using the D&D license; the action RPG Forgotten Realms: Demon Stone (2004). The studio was closed down in 2008.

== Reception ==
Generally well received by the gaming press, the original game won the Origins Award for "Best Fantasy or Science Fiction Computer Game of 1988". Some reviewers criticized the game's similarities to other contemporary games and its slowness in places, but praised the game's graphics and its role-playing adventure and combat aspects. Also well-regarded was the ability to export player characters from Pool of Radiance to subsequent SSI games in the series. Tony Dillon reviewed Curse of the Azure Bonds for CU Amiga-64, scoring it with an overall score of 89%. He commented on the game: "The graphics are more or less the same as PoR, which is no bad thing, and thankfully the game is still as entertaining and involving as the original". He noted that the game's first-person perspective is similar to that of Bard's Tale, and also features an overhead view similar to that of Gauntlet.

== See also ==
- Azure Bonds
- Pools of Darkness (novel)
- Pool of Twilight
