= Curse of the Azure Bonds =

1989 video game

- Cover art by Clyde Caldwell
- Developer: Strategic Simulations
- Publishers: NA: Strategic Simulations; EU: U.S. Gold
- Director: George MacDonald
- Composer: David Warhol
- Series: Gold Box
- Platforms: Amiga, Apple II, Atari ST, Commodore 64, MS-DOS, Mac, PC-98
- Release: NA: 1989; EU: 1989
- Genre: Tactical role-playing
- Mode: Single-player

Curse of the Azure Bonds is a role-playing video game developed and published by Strategic Simulations in 1989. It is the second in a four-part series of Forgotten Realms Advanced Dungeons & Dragons Gold Box games, continuing the events of Pool of Radiance.

The game serves as a sequel to the 1988 novel, Azure Bonds, that was written by Kate Novak and Jeff Grubb, and is the first book of the Finder's Stone trilogy. An adventure module of the same name, coded FRC2, was written based on the game.

== Gameplay ==
A party of up to six player characters and two non-player characters is required to complete the various quests in the game. Player characters from Pool of Radiance (POR) can be transferred to Curse of the Azure Bonds, although players do not need to have played POR to play this game. Characters can likewise be transferred from Hillsfar, another contemporaneous AD&D-based game. The paladin and ranger are two new character classes available in this game. A player can generate new characters, choosing the options for each character from six races, nine alignments, two genders, and six character classes. Multi-class characters can be created for half-elf, elf, dwarf, halfling, and gnome characters. New characters begin with 25,000 experience points, which starts single-class characters at level 5. Multi-classed characters have the total number of experience points divided equally amongst their classes, giving either 12,500 or 8,333 experience points, for two or three classes, respectively. This means multi-class characters generally start at level 4, although a triple-classed character would start as a level 3 magic-user. The player can adjust the statistics for any character before beginning the game.

Curse of the Azure Bonds uses the style from Pool of Radiance, with the main adventuring action using a first person perspective. The player uses the top left window to view the current location and move, and can view the status panel on the right and select from the commands along the bottom. Using these commands, the player can select from a range of actions and tasks including casting spells, switching weapons, or resting and preparing spells for the day. The player creates an icon to represent each character, which can be customized to taste.

During combat, the screen display changes so that the right half of the screen becomes the status panel, and the left half shows an overhead view of the combat. Characters can use spells and ranged weapons by lining up their targets.

=== Game differences ===
Curse of the Azure Bonds contained new features compared to its predecessor, Pool of Radiance. The game primarily takes place in the Dalelands, and the overland map allows a player to select an adjacent location and automatically travel there. There are random encounters with monsters when traveling to locations. The player may now choose the classes of paladin and ranger for characters in addition to fighter, thief, magic-user, and cleric. A Fix command was added to the Encamp menu, which allows a party to be healed very quickly as long as a living and conscious cleric or paladin is in the party. The graphics were improved slightly, though everything was still drawn in 16 colors.

== Plot ==
=== Setting ===
Curse of the Azure Bonds takes place in the Forgotten Realms setting. The adventure begins in the city of Tilverton, a relatively small town that nonetheless contains sufficient shops and services to equip the party. Although the characters begin the game with no equipment, each character does receive money at the start of the game with which to buy weapons and armor. Outside the city of Tilverton, the characters may explore caverns, sewers, and the wilderness outside. Other locations include the Elven Forest, Zhentil Keep, the temple at Yulash, and the citadel at Hap, though these locations cannot be freely explored by the party. Instead, the player can use a menu to select places within the locations to visit. Yulash is under siege by marauders, and characters entering the town are also in danger from crumbling walls and sinkholes.

=== Plot summary ===
At the start of the game, the player characters are adventurers of great renown who wake up from a magic sleep to find themselves in a small inn in the city of Tilverton, with all of their possessions stolen and no memory of how it happened. A landlord passing by informs the characters that they have been unconscious for over a month after suffering an attack. Each of the player characters has five azure-colored markings similar to tattoos, called bonds, on one arm. The party had been ambushed while traveling on the road to Tilverton. They were taken captive and cursed with the magical bonds embedded on their arms; the quest for the characters is to get rid of these bonds. Characters can visit the sage Filani, who will give them information about the bonds. Each of these bonds represents a separate evil faction, and through the bonds, which glow when active and are the result of a spell with an effect similar to possession, the factions can control the actions of the characters.

The first bond forces the characters to attack the passing royal carriage, resulting in a fight with the royal guards. The characters begin searching for the first controlling faction, a band of assassins known as the Fire Knives. After defeating the Fire Knives which eliminates the first bond, the characters are banished from Tilverton for trying to kill the King. The characters may then journey to Shadowdale or Ashabenford. The player then spends the rest of the game deciding where to go next to remove another bond.

As the story continues, the adventurers are offered some side quests, such as confronting the King of Cormyr and his daughter the princess, saving Dimswart the Sage, finding three artifacts, and investigating Dagger Falls. Princess Nacacia of Cormyr went missing a year ago, when she fled a marriage that her father arranged, and it is up to the party to find her. The game combines mini-adventures with major adventures in the quest of the party to remove the Azure Bonds. After removing two bonds, the player gains the ability to use the Search command on the wilderness map to locate mini-dungeons under certain towns; these caverns are dangerous, but the party can gain both experience and treasure in them.

The next three bonds can be removed in any order, and are controlled by Mogion, leader of the cult of Moander, Dracandros the Red Wizard, and Fzoul Chembryl and his beholder allies. Dracandros is found in the Red Tower in Haptooth, which is accessed via the dracolich cave. The cult of Moander is based in Yulash, where the characters encounter the non-player characters that appear on the game's box and book cover, Alias and Dragonbait, who can join the party. After defeating the cult, the party must also defeat three Bits O' Moander, which behave as powerful shambling mounds. The characters will face a beholder in Zhentil Keep, along with a group of minotaurs and a medusa.

When the player has successfully removed four of the bonds, the characters will need to fight Tyranthraxus, the villain of the previous game Pools of Radiance, who takes the form of a storm giant, in the ruins of Myth Drannor. After defeating Tyranthraxus, the game is over.

== Development ==
The game includes a manual to explain its game play, and an Adventurer's Journal which contains contextual paragraphs intended to be read at specific points during the game. The game also includes a 2-ply code wheel featuring runes for protection against game piracy; on occasion during play, the player will be asked to enter a letter from the wheel before the characters can continue their journey.

Curse of the Azure Bonds (1989) was the first of three sequels to Pool of Radiance (1988), and was followed by Secret of the Silver Blades (1990) and Pools of Darkness (1991). Players of Secret of the Silver Blades may begin the game by using characters previously generated in Curse of the Azure Bonds. Curse of the Azure Bonds was released on the Apple II, Commodore 64, and DOS in 1989, the Amiga and Macintosh in 1990, and the Atari ST in 1991. It was distributed in the UK by U.S. Gold. A Nintendo SNES videogame version was planned as a sequel to the NES conversion of Pool Of Radiance, but was abandoned; the publisher in both cases was FCI.

The game is linked to both an AD&D adventure module and to a novel of the same name. The adventure module is based on the computer game.

== Novel ==
The novel Azure Bonds is a Forgotten Realms fantasy adventure book, written by Jeff Grubb and Kate Novak and published by TSR in 1988. The story begins with an adventurer named Alias awakening in an inn with amnesia and a set of magical blue sigils on her arm. She soon learns that they represent five evil masters that can control her mind, forcing her to do their owners' will. With the aid of a mysterious lizard-creature named Dragonbait, a southern mage called Akabar Bel Akash, and a halfling bard named Olive Ruskettle, she sets out to learn more about the sigils' creators, and free herself of them. It is the first book of the Finder's Stone trilogy, followed by The Wyvern's Spur in 1990 and Song of the Saurials in 1991.

== Reception ==
Reception

Review scores
Publication	Score
Dragon	5/5 (DOS)
Amiga Action	72% (Amiga)
CU Amiga-64	89% (Amiga)
.info	4/5 (Amiga)
The Games Machine	90%
Zzap!64	86% (C64); 71% (Amiga)
Amiga Joker	74% (Amiga)
Games International	4/5 (PC)

Award
Publication	Award
Origins Award	Best Fantasy or Science Fiction Computer Game of 1989

Curse of the Azure Bonds was almost as successful as Pool of Radiance, with SSI selling 179,795 copies. More than one third were the Commodore 64 version, benefiting from SSI being the last major American publisher of games for the computer. By 1996, the Pool of Radiance series had reached combined global sales above 800,000 copies.

In the August 1989 edition of CU Amiga-64, Tony Dillon commented that "the graphics are more or less the same as [Pool of Radiance], which is no bad thing, and thankfully the game is still as entertaining and involving as the original". He noted that the game's first-person perspective is similar to that of The Bard's Tale, and also features an overhead view similar to that of Gauntlet. He gave the game an excellent overall score of 89%.

In the August 1989 edition of The Games Machine (issue 21), Paul Rigby previewed the upcoming release of Curse of the Azure Bonds and noted he had not been happy with Pool of Radiance, which he felt was more like basic D&D due to certain classes, spells, and other elements being unavailable. However he believed that Curse of the Azure Bonds would allay his criticism, noting that "six extra character classes, 20 extra high-level spells and a bunch of new monsters make CAB a very promising product". In the following issue of The Games Machine, Rigby reviewed the actual game, and confirmed that he considered it to be a dramatic improvement over Pool of Radiance, with introduction of new classes, better storylines, and an improved combat engine. He concluded by giving Curse of the Azure Bonds an excellent overall score of 90%: "Overall, CAB is an excellent RPG, much improved and polished over POR [...] With a good storyline and excellent graphics, CAB is recommended whatever version you have".

In the September 1989 edition of Computer Gaming World (issue 63), Scorpia reviewed the PC version and was critical of certain elements: she found the ending disappointing; believed that the game speed — which had been slow in Pool of Radiance — was still a problem; was disappointed that little was added to the game except for the ranger and paladin class; and that the emphasis was still on hack-and-slash as opposed to puzzle-solving and genuine role-playing. Scorpia concluded the review by calling the game a "standard follow-up", saying it was "better than POR in some ways", but that "combat still predominates". In a retrospective review in 1993, Scorpia called the game a "sequel to Pool of Radiance with a bit more plot" and "mainly hack'n'slash leading up to the usual 'Kill [the evil villain]' ending".

The September 1989 edition of Zzap (issue 53) featured a review of the Commodore 64 version. The reviewer felt that the addition of more character classes "allows the player more choice and a lot more scope to create a truly mixed band of adventurers, mirroring the original RPG well". The reviewer also felt the monsters were better drawn and the game's plot had more depth than previous RPGs from SSI, although some innovation was lost because the game is a sequel. However, the reviewer said that "with its intricate plot and superb player interaction Curse creates a very strong atmosphere with authenticity lent to the proceedings by the mass of options and the well executed tactical combat display". The reviewer concluded by giving the game an above-average rating of 86%.

In the September 1989 edition of Dragon (issue 149), Patricia Hartley and Kirk Lesser found that "both the user's manual and the Adventurer's Journal [...] are extremely well written". The pair also admired the number of encounters — more than in other adventure games — and the number of hours required to play, more than 120 hours by their count. They concluded by giving the game a perfect rating of 5 out of 5: "As the adventure continues, you'll find that tearing yourself away from CAB is the most difficult decision of all".

In the November 1989 edition of Games International, Jamie Thomson commented that "the plot is good enough, although not that original for games of this kind", although he liked the role-playing aspects of the game, calling it "a role-playing computer game in one of the purist (sic) forms I have yet encountered [...] surprisingly one of the best I have tried (and one of the very few I've had the enery to play to the bitter end)". Thomson concluded by giving the game above average scores of 4 out of 5 for both game play and graphics.

Jim Trunzo reviewed Curse of the Azure Bonds in White Wolf #18 (Nov./Dec., 1989), rating it a 5 out of 5 and stated that "It's rare to find a computer game whose depth and size is truly epic and that manages to sustain the player's interest over the course of the adventure without becoming repetitive and laborious. Curse of the Azure Bonds manages to do just that. If Pool of Radiance fell a little short of AD&Der's expectations, Curse of the Azure Bonds more than makes up for it. Truly the best of the official AD&D computer games, this product is destined to be a classic."

In the January 1991 edition of Amiga Action (issue 16), Doug Johns and Alex Simmons reviewed the Amiga version of Curse of the Azure Bonds. Johns felt that it was a very good RPG worth getting hold of, although he felt it was a bit too similar to other AD&D computer games and less polished than Champions of Krynn. Simmons found the game decidedly average and less appealing compared to previous releases such as Champions of Krynn, but felt that RPG fanatics who enjoyed SSI's other titles should consider purchasing it. They concluded by giving it an average rating of 72%.

In the March 1991 edition of .info magazine (issue 37), Judith Kilbury-Cobb reviewed the Amiga version, and felt that the graphics and animation were noticeably improved, and that combat encounters were still emphasized while being made more manageable. She concluded by giving the game an above-average rating of four out of five, calling it "most playable AD&D game yet".

The January 1991 edition of Zzap reviewed the Amiga version, noting that this version of Curse is "a game that has fallen victim to the steady trudge of progress". The reviewer felt that the game was so dated by 1991 that Amiga AD&D devotees might want to buy the game to add it to their collections, but the reviewer could not "help but wonder why SSI have bothered to release this conversion when they should be concentrating on bringing prompt Amiga versions of their newer titles". The reviewer concluded by giving the game an average rating of 71% overall.

The January 1991 issue of the German gaming magazine Amiga Joker wrote that "Curse of the Azure Bonds is once again [Advanced Dungeons and Dragons] at its finest ... the combat is the best thing that the game has to offer, and has lots of variation therein". The reviewer criticized the small field of view as well as the sound effects and music, which they gave a poor score of 33%. They were frustrated by the dated controls and furthermore criticized its similarity to the rest of the series, saying "the presentation of the game is admittedly the same as its predecessors ... and looks more like C64 rather than Amiga. This goes for the graphics as well as the infrequent sound effects, but applies most of all to the controls, with which one must laboriously agonise through the menus". The reviewer concluded by giving the Amiga version an average overall score of 74%.

A retrospective article on the website GameSpot titled "History of Advanced Dungeons & Dragons" commented that "in terms of gameplay and structure, Curse of the Azure Bonds followed its predecessor more or less directly, though it broadened the path considerably". The reviewer mentioned that the game system benefited from material that had been missing from Pool of Radiance, such as the ability for clerics and magic-users to attain higher character levels, the ability to enlist characters of paladin and ranger character classes, and the option for human characters to become dual-class characters.

In the 2003 book High Score!: The Illustrated History of Electronic Games, Rusel DeMaria and Johnny Wilson related that SSI ran into a play balance dilemma by allowing players to import experienced characters from Pool of Radiance. In order to make the game playable for both beginners and players with built-up characters, the designers had most of the characters' weapons and equipment stolen at the beginning of the game. SSI received criticism for this decision, and had to come up with new solutions to balance play in future games.

In a retrospective review in 2004, the website GameSpy commented that Azure Bonds was a worthy addition to the series, and was, in many aspects, superior to its predecessor.

== Awards ==
At the 1990 Origins Awards, the game was awarded Best Fantasy or Science Fiction Computer Game of 1989.
