= Masquerades (novel) =

1995 novel written by Kate Novak and Jeff Grubb

- First edition
- Author: Kate Novak and Jeff Grubb
- Language: English
- Genre: Fantasy novel
- Published: 1995 (TSR, Inc.)
- Publication place: United States
- Media type: Print (Paperback)
- Pages: 376
- ISBN: 0-7869-0152-7
- Preceded by: Song of the Saurials
- Followed by: Curse of the Shadowmage

Masquerades is a novel written by Kate Novak and Jeff Grubb that takes place in the Forgotten Realms setting. It is based on the campaign setting for the Dungeons & Dragons fantasy role-playing game.

== Premise ==
The novel features the continued adventure of the heroine Alias and her companion Dragonbait from the novel Azure Bonds and takes place after the events in the Finder's Stone trilogy. The novel takes place in the city of Westgate and follows the struggle against the Night Masks and their mysterious leader, called The Faceless.

== Sequels ==
The story of the newly-ascended god Finder continues in Finder's Bane and Tymora's Luck.

== Reviews ==
- Review by John C. Bunnell (1995) in Dragon Magazine, November 1995
- Kliatt
