= Steve Winter (game designer) =

American game designer

- Born: December 8, 1957 (age 68); Dubuque, Iowa, United States
- Occupations: Game designer, editor
- Spouse: Mary Kirchoff (September 1985-)
- Writing career
- Genre: Role-playing games

Steve Winter (born December 8, 1957) is an American game designer who worked on numerous products for the Dungeons & Dragons fantasy role-playing game, which was originally published by TSR and later Wizards of the Coast.

== Early life ==
Winter was born in Dubuque, Iowa on December 8, 1957. Winter attended Catholic school for grade school and high school, and had two years of Catholic college before he transferred to Iowa State University at Ames. “A nun introduced me to the works of J. R. R. Tolkien in high school ... Previously, I had been mostly into historical novels and military history. For the next several years, I read all the fantasy I could get my hands on — but I didn’t enjoy very much of it. I couldn’t find anything with the same sense of humor and style as Tolkien. I also read a lot of science fiction.”

In 1978, while attending college, Winter worked part-time at a department store which carried a few wargames in its small games department. He began playing with the wargame The Russian Campaign by Avalon Hill; “The Russian Campaign intrigued me, so I bought Tobruk, which was the game that changed my life. I played it to death.” At Iowa State University, Winter was majoring in journalism. “I worked on the campus newsletter, which, incidentally, was the seventh largest daily newspaper in Iowa. One day, I was proofreading the classified ad column, and came across an ad for the Iowa State Gamers. I went to their next meeting and was introduced to the D&D game ... From then on, I played all day every Saturday, but I never was one of those 5-hour-a-day,7-day-a-week gamers. The newspaper took up most of my time, and I had my heart set on becoming a journalist.”

== Career ==
After graduating, Winter got a job on the Peoria (Ill.) Journal-Star as a city desk reporter. “The first night I was there I covered the first murder in Peoria for over a year. I also covered Reagan’s last campaign appearance in 1980. Then there were less exciting jobs, like covering the Mass Transit Board.” His position with the Peoria Journal Star was a temporary position, and he was laid off after the woman he was substituting for came back from maternity leave. “One day I was in a hobby shop in Peoria, and saw an issue of DRAGON Magazine that mentioned that TSR was looking for editors. I sent my resume, and got an interview. I ended up coming to Lake Geneva three times. The first time, my car broke down, and I had to call and postpone the interview. The second time, everything worked out. But on the third trip, my car broke down again, but I was within five miles of Lake Geneva, so I was able to get it towed in.”

Winter began with TSR in May 1981 as a Games Editor. In this position, he is credited as the editor of both Star Frontiers boxed games, the Gangbusters games, the 1983 World of Greyhawk revision, and the Top Secret Companion. Winter was promoted to Manager of Game Editors in 1984, and continued working on many different projects in addition to his management duties, including editing half of the book Oriental Adventures. Jeff Grubb and Winter designed the Marvel Super Heroes RPG. He has worked on many game products for the Dungeons & Dragons game since 1981, as a designer, editor, coordinator, and creative director. Some of his works as a game designer include Ruins of Adventure, The Complete Psionics Handbook, the 3rd edition version of Monster Manual II, and Lords of Madness. Winter co-wrote the Dragonlance novel Wanderlust with Mary Kirchoff.

Winter ran annual miniatures events at the Gen Con game convention, including the Car Wars “Lake Geneva Death Rally” series. Winter wrote "The Art of Three-Dimensional Gaming" booklet for the Battlesystem Fantasy Combat Supplement. Winter designed and developed an SPI game, Sniper Patrol, combining and expanding the older Sniper and Patrol games. Winter, with Jim Ward, David Cook, and Mike Breault, also co-wrote the adventure scenario that was adapted into the game Pool of Radiance. Winter later worked as a producer for Wizards of the Coast's D&D and D&D Miniatures websites. He left Wizards of the Coast on December 14, 2011.

== Personal life ==
In September 1985, Winter married Mary Kirchoff, who had been a member of Dragon magazine's editorial staff and editor of the Polyhedron Newszine. The couple had an Irish setter named Hannibal.
