= Alias (Forgotten Realms) =

Fictional character in the Forgotten Realms campaign setting

Alias of Westgate
- Forgotten Realms character
- Cover to Azure Bonds

In-universe information
- Race: Artificial Human
- Gender: Female
- Alignment: Chaotic Good
- Home: The Lost Vale

Alias is a fictional character in the Forgotten Realms campaign setting for the Dungeons & Dragons fantasy role-playing game. Alias is the main character of Azure Bonds. She also appeared in the computer game, Curse of the Azure Bonds which was based on the book. Alias later appears in the sequel Song of the Saurials, and the standalone book Masquerades.

Alias is an artificial being crafted by magic as a private assassin, slave and tool of those who created her. She is neither truly human, nor a crude golem or homunculus; but a truly living being with a soul; which was provided by her companion, the saurial paladin known as Dragonbait. As such, she takes the place of a "non-born child" in fulfilling an ancient prophecy to free the Darkbringer, Moander.

== Fictional character biography ==
As detailed in Azure Bonds, Alias awakens in a tavern room. She soon discovers that she has a newly acquired azure colored tattoo imprinted on the inside of her sword arm extending from her wrist to her elbow; and she has no memory of how she got there, or where the tattoo came from. At first she attributes her memory loss to inebriation and the tattoo as a drunken prank by companions.

Alias is informed by the Innkeeper of the 'Hidden Lady' that she was found unconscious on the doorstep, and no-one knows where she came from. A southern mage, Akabar Bel Akash introduces himself and offers to investigate her tattoo; but a simple Detect Magic spell causes Alias severe pain, and an eruption of azure light from the tattoo. An attempt to have the tattoo removed by a priest goes even less well; and Alias finds herself compelled to attack the hapless priest and nearly kills him.

Before long, Alias becomes the leader of a disparate trio of adventurers - the mysterious lizard-creature whom she names Dragonbait, Bel Akash and the famed halfling "bard" named Olive Ruskettle whom the other three are hired to rescue from a red dragon named Mistinarperadnacles Hai Draco ('Mist').

It is later revealed that Alias herself is in fact a complicated, magically created, artificial being intended by her creators to be their proxy in various nefarious purposes. Her long term memories were actually granted to her by her sole benign (but misled) creator and her short term memory loss is due in part to the gap between the end of her artificial memories and her premature awakening. She was 'programmed' with a variety of unconscious tasks and desires on behalf of her creators, to fulfil their goals without even knowing that she had done so. She was also programmed to attack those who tried to remove such controls - such as the priest she consulted on awakening.

Alias's adventures involve her defeating each of her creators in turn, to become free of their control. By the end of the book, only two are left alive - the Nameless Bard, and the dark god, Moander; who was discorporated, but would return to Faerun in the later novel, Song of the Saurials.

In the first book, Azure Bonds, Alias is relatively self-confident and strong-willed. In the later book, Song of the Saurials, her new self-knowledge coupled with the relatively limited emotional maturity her implanted memories gave her (the Nameless Bard being a man of extreme vanity and selfishness) began to manifest with more immature behaviours, petulance and lack of emotional control.

== Appearance ==
Alias is a female warrior and at the onset of her story she is portrayed as an archetypal adventuress, wearing simple leather armour and chainmail. She is described as tall, nearing six feet, muscular and beautiful, with a mop of unruly red hair. She is depicted on the cover artwork in ceremonial armour, given to her late in the book by Cassana. The striking (and impractical) appearance of the armour is attributed to Cassana's vanity. Cassana, one of Alias's creators, saw Alias both as a toy to entertain her, and a recreation of herself. She thus fashioned Alias's signature chainmail armour "split open at the middle, baring the flesh between her breasts and offering any sword an easy target" yet enchanting it to protect her better than solid steel would have done. Cassana clearly did this purely to amuse herself and to titillate those around her at her cleverness, and Alias's sex appeal. Dragonbait, Alias's friend and soulmate, repeatedly nagged her to stop wearing it, believing that it was immodest; but Alias refused - supposedly because it was more comfortable than plate mail.

== Personality ==
Alias is extremely likeable, humorous and sarcastic, but with a noble and tender side her 'father' lacked; and a strong distaste for clerics and priests - "conditioning" by Cassana, according to the half-elf Kyre. Despite possessing a brilliant mind, Alias has little emotional maturity. She grew jealous easily, and it wasn't easy for her to accept that she couldn't always be the centre of attention. Alias clearly favors her revealing armour, and enjoys the attention it brings. When helping Zhara to impersonate Alias, Dragonbait's first advice was "Don't look modest. Gods know, Alias isn't."

== Companions ==
Dragonbait is the first of the companions encountered by Alias. He physically resembles a greenish, lizardman-like creature. Incapable of normal speech, his early behavior is often clownish and servile but obedient. It is eventually learned that he is in fact a highly accomplished member of his race that are known as saurials. His name is actually an acquired nickname courtesy of Alias; whilst his true saurial name is "Champion". Dragonbait is a paladin and an extremely skilled fighter. He demonstrates the wisdom common to paladins with unusual humility; considering his capture and near-sacrifice by Phalse as a lesson on the nature of Justice. Like all saurials, he communicates through high-pitched whistles and chirps, his language augmented by the radiation of emotionally linked scents.

Akabar Bel Akash is a tall, educated Turmishman. He is handsome, and wears the three blue dots on his forehead of a scholar of magic. He is a skilled businessman, and clearly enjoys the mild adventure of travelling with his family's goods caravan. A friend of the sage Dimswart, he engineers the opportunity to have a 'real' adventure alongside Alias. Despite her considering him a "greengrocer", and terrifying experiences including being possessed by the Darkbringer, Moander, Akabar rises to the challenge to demonstrate the value of his magical skills. Akabar prefers Alteration and Divination magic over directly damaging spells. He uses his magic to scout and to enhance the physical abilities of others; enabling the red dragon Mist to fight toe-to-toe against the Abomination of Moander. He is attracted to Alias, but (romantically) put off by her headstrong nature. He later meets and marries her clone Zarah; which hurts her feelings terribly. A religious man, despite being captured by Moander for a second time and imprisoned in the Abyss, Akabar uses his magical and spiritual abilities to sacrifice himself to his gods, inspiring Finder to risk his own life slaying the Darkbringer forever.

Olive Ruskettle is a halfling who claims to be a bard. She is actually a talented thief and minstrel; but has not been through true bardic training, and cannot cast magic or enchant with her music. She 'won' her name in a game of dice with the "true" bard Olav Ruskettle, a noted drinker and gambler.

== Creators ==
Alias was created by six powers; although their involvement in her creation varied widely. The tattoo was to be a means of control as well as a branding of ownership by each of the collaborating parties involved in her creation. Her primary creator was the Nameless Bard, Finder Wyvernspur. He fashioned her body as a clone of Cassana; modified for perfect health, strength and beauty. He also created her memories; filling her head with his own songs and the desire to sing them. Alias's initial short term memory loss is actually due to the gap between the end of her artificial memories and her premature awakening.

Cassana is a wizard; possessed of power, intelligence and cruelty. She organised the group, and supplied her flesh to clone into Alias; although unlike a typical clone which is weaker than the original, Alias was effectively an improved version of Cassana; being stronger, healthier and younger. Cassana had complete control of Alias through her wand (within a limited radius) and referred to her as 'Puppet'.

Zrie Prakis is a lich, the dead lover of Cassana. Although a powerful wizard like Cassana, he was nevertheless killed by her in a duel after they fell out. Prakis was in the process of achieving lichdom, and Cassana completed the process but tied his remaining life force to her wand, making him her undead slave. Although superficially controlled by Cassana, Prakis supported the heroes of the novel in regrouping in order to steal Cassana's wand so that he could kill her. His necromantic abilities were employed in animating Alias; he referred to her as 'Little one'.

Phalse was a unique extraplanar entity. Masquerading initially as a halfling (and with halfling-like desires for Olive Ruskettle), his true form was that of a beholder-like creature, with mouthed tentacles instead of extra eyes. This form could levitate, or use an artificial body to walk and fight. Phalse captured Dragonbait and split his soul to give one to Alias. He had little direct control over Alias until he stole Cassana's wand; but instead he duplicated the work of the other creators to make a dozen copies. He was an old enemy of Moander, although the reasons were never clear. He referred to Alias as 'One'.

Moander the Darkbringer, god of decay, provided the life-force to animate Alias. Alias was programmed to seek out his sole avatar, the Abomination of Moander, trapped beneath Yulash; and enable it to pass through the walls of the prison which contained it. Moander rampaged briefly through the realms before battling Mistinarperadnacles; both were consumed in a methane-fuelled explosion when the red dragon ignited Moander's rotting shell. Moander and his disciples called Alias 'Servant'.

The 'Fire Knives' were a thieves' guild which supplied finance for the magical operation. They were permitted to program Alias to attack anyone who sounded (or presumably, looked) like King Azoun IV of Cormyr; but this plot was spoiled when she heard Giogioni Wyvernspur impersonating Azoun at a wedding. Their name for Alias was 'Weapon'.

== Other versions ==
The extraplanar entity Phalse made a dozen slightly varied copies of Alias. These were described in Azure Bonds as follows (quote):

"They were as similar as a batch of bowls a potter might throw in a day...they all had her features. Each face was framed with hair some shade of red, from reddish black to strawberry blonde. Their skin tones covered the spectrum from the pale flesh of the north to the swarthy complexions of the south. A body in the heavy armour of Mulhorand lay beside one in wolfhide robes... The sultry slitted dress of a Waterdeep courtesan adorned a body one over from another dressed in the conservative robes of a Moonshae druid... One figure, wrapped in black, was equipped with eastern weapons..."

The duplicates vanished and were thought destroyed at the end of Azure Bonds; but some appeared in subsequent novels:

- Jade More - Jade was a larcenous version of Alias, with loose morals and a wicked sense of humor. She was a talented thief, and befriended Olive Ruskettle whom she worked with for several months before being killed by Flattery for stealing his purse - he thought that she was his own 'version' of Alias, Cat.
- Cat - Cat is a magic-user. She was taken in by Flattery, and became his wife and apprentice to gain the reward of restoring her missing memories ( the same amnesia Alias experienced in Azure Bonds). She was more seductive than either Alias or Jade, and prepared to use her looks and wiles to manipulate men.
- Zhara - Zhara is a Turmish version of Alias, and a priestess of Tymora. She married Akabar Bel Akash (as his third wife) and traveled with him when he began having prophetic dreams about Moander. Zhara is superficially proud and quick to judge others - particularly women from other cultures - but lacks the self-confidence that marks many of her 'sisters'. For a while, she used Alias's armor to impersonate her; although Zhara clearly felt humiliated showing so much of her body publicly, and was glad to give the armor back when her charade was over. Although a priestess, she was a capable fighter with a quick temper; she had apparently once broken the arm of her sister-wife Kasim.

Zhara describes meeting other "sisters" in Song of the Saurials as follows (quote): "One is a sage in Candlekeep, one a mage in Immersea, one a warrior like yourself from the eastern lands. I know of two others. One was a thief who was murdered this past spring. The other is a lady of some power in Waterdeep."

== Abilities ==
Alias is a highly skilled and acrobatic fighter; favoring the use of swords. Although a fighter by trade, Alias remembers more songs than most bards, and can "sing like a bird". Finder also gave her the strong desire to sing them in Shadowdale, where the Harpers were strong. Alias has considerable other knowledge which is rare in the typical fighter, using the Thieves signing language easily, and being better versed in Dragonlore than most living scholars.

Alias's magical tattoos, or 'bonds' are the mark of her creators. They are powerfully magical, and will respond as such to a Detect Magic spell. They effect a permanent "Misdirection" spell on Alias. On the downside, they enable certain individuals to control her, and will force her to attack anyone who tries to remove them.

Alias has the ability to tap into the collective subconscious of her tribe - originally Dragonbait's tribe of saurials - and sing of their joys and woes. This is known as "soul singing". Alias may also tap into their dreams, and dream them herself. She has been granted the permanent ability of Tongues with respect to saurial, and can speak and understand this complex language; even producing aromas to reflect her emotional mood.

== Campaign Use ==
Alias is an agent of the Harpers, primarily active in Shadowdale and the Lost Dale. She may be encountered as a source of information, hired as a sell-sword, or encountered as an opponent.

Alias's duplicates may be encountered in almost any campaign, in any role. They all share the traits of physical and mental strength, stubbornness. Her duplicates have thus far appeared less emotionally childish than Alias; perhaps because their sole creator Phalse better understood how to control and manipulate emotions. All have a period of amnesia between their programmed and real memories. They also all possess the power of Misdirection, which may be highly useful to them and to the party. It is not established whether the duplicates share Alias's unconscious 'missions', or have new ones of their own...

Alias is a featured character in the adventure Curse of the Azure Bonds (1989). Alias appears with first edition AD&D game statistics in Hall of Heroes (1989), and second edition AD&D game statistics in Heroes' Lorebook (1996).

== Reception ==
In the Io9 series revisiting older Dungeons & Dragons novels, Rob Bricken found "Alias" to be "admittedly an eye-roll of a character name" but found her mysterious origins "compelling", and describes her relationships with her companions by noting that she is "a proficient fighter, but she can't fend off several trained assassins without some lizard-y help. She also doesn't slay the red dragon holding Olive. Instead, they trick it by playing on its draconic code of honor, and once Olive has been freed they run like hell". Bricken also commented on the revelations of her true origins: "Once the bad guys start spilling secrets, Alias' origin goes from mysterious to wildly convoluted. First, the reasons these evil knuckleknobs created her is, to use the medical term, whack-a-doodle. Moander's need to create a clone is key to unlocking his magical prison tracks. As for the lich's motivation—since Cassana used her own form to create Alias, she's effectively a younger, hotter, less powerful and murderous version of the woman he hate-loves." Finally, Bricken comments on Alias herself as "a strong female character in the traditional '80s fantasy vein, but one who only wears skimpy, cleavage-baring armor (as seen on the book's cover, of course) when Cassandra forcibly dresses her for the final sacrifice. She has absolutely no romantic thoughts about any character in the book, so she's never weak-kneed around pretty boys or secretly wants to be a housewife instead of a sellsword, a far-too-common flaw for female characters in '80s fantasy. The book's most interesting conflict is within Alias, as she struggles with the forces controlling her, whether she's putting her friends in danger, and her identity once she realizes she was literally born last month."
