= Pool of Radiance (novel) =

1989 novel by James M. Ward and Jane Cooper Hong

- Cover of the first edition
- Author: James M. Ward, Jane Cooper Hong
- Cover artist: Clyde Caldwell
- Language: English
- Series: Heroes of Phlan
- Genre: Fantasy novel
- Publisher: TSR, Inc.
- Publication date: 1989
- Publication place: United States
- Media type: Print (Paperback)
- Pages: 316
- ISBN: 0-88038-735-1
- OCLC: 21019475
- Followed by: Pools of Darkness

Pool of Radiance is a novel based on the Pool of Radiance computer role-playing game. It was written by James Ward and Jane Cooper Hong, and published by TSR in November 1989. The novel is set in the Forgotten Realms setting based on the Dungeons & Dragons fantasy role-playing game. This book was the first in a trilogy, followed by Pools of Darkness and Pool of Twilight.

== Plot summary ==
Three companions, Shal Bal of Cormyr, Tarl Desanea, a cleric of Tyr, and Ren o' the Blade are brought together in Phlan by circumstance and encounter various threats as they work to purge the city of civilized Phlan, the restored part of the destroyed city of Old Phlan, culminating in a faceoff with the Lord of the Ruins, Tyranthraxus.

== Reception ==
In the Io9 series revisiting older Dungeons & Dragons novels, Rob Bricken commented that "frankly, I'm unsurprised that Pool of [Radiance] rolls a straightforward 4—no bonuses, no penalties, just a simple, unquestionable failure."
