= Heroes' Lorebook =

1996 role-playing game accessory

- Genre: Role-playing games
- Publisher: TSR
- Publication date: 1996

Heroes' Lorebook is an accessory for the Forgotten Realms campaign setting for the second edition of the Advanced Dungeons & Dragons fantasy role-playing game.

== Contents ==
Heroes' Lorebook updates the previously published Hall of Heroes Forgotten Realms supplement. This book contains full game statistics and detailed backgrounds for 61 of the most prominent characters from the setting featured in novels and other game supplements published through 1995, as well as notes for using the characters in a game campaign. The book details around 60 heroes in 160 pages, including characters such as Elminster, Laeral Silverhand and King Azoun Obarskyr IV. It provides game statistics for each character, and presents lengthy details on their allies and enemies, appearance, personality, location, history, motivations, uses in a game campaign and sources for further reading. Following these descriptions, the book contains sections which for the special magical items used by these heroes, and gives statistics for the specialized spells that are mentioned earlier in the book.

The 160-page book features a two-page introduction, which explains that this book is an update and a revision of Hall of Heroes. The book compiles information from novels and other sources published through the end of 1995. The book describes 60 characters, each including an illustration, game statistics, suggestions for campaign uses, and a list of the sources consulted for each character's entry. The book's center 16-page section (pages 73–88) presents a series of color illustrations, many of which were created especially for this book, depicting nearly half of the characters described in the book in a variety of scenes. Character descriptions appear on pages 6–135, and include such notables as Alias, Arilyn Moonblade, Bruenor Battlehammer, Danilo Thann, Drizzt Do'Urden, Dragonbait, Elminster, Khelben "Blackstaff" Arunsun, Olive Ruskettle, Shandril Shessair, and Wulfgar. Supplemental material on pages 136-158 includes notes on the Chosen of Mystra, magical items and effects, special wizard spells, heroic groups (including the Harpers and the Knights of Myth Drannor), and an index to the book. A list of sources mentioned throughout the book can be found on pages 159 and 160.

== Publication history ==
The book, with product code TSR 9525, was published in 1996, and was written by Dale Donovan and Paul Culotta, with cover art by Doug Beckmann and interior art by Jordi Torres, Ned Dameron, Tony Crnkovich, and Valerie Valusek.

== Reception ==
Paul Pettengale reviewed Heroes' Lorebook for Arcane magazine, rating it a 5 out of 10 overall. He stated that because the Forgotten Realms campaign is the most popular setting and has been around for so long, "and there have been so many novels written off the back of it, there are a huge number of heroes wandering the Realms. TSR has now gone about the herculean effort of cataloguing the lot and giving them stats, belongings and character summaries." Pettengale concluded the review by saying, "Although this is a highly polished collection of characters, and the background detail is interesting for any fan of Forgotten Realms, one has to wonder at the actual use of it. If you were planning to introduce one of these ultra-powerful characters into your campaign, surely you could make up the stats yourself, and it's unlikely that you're ever going to use more than half a dozen of these characters. So, great in theory, but in practice I think it's a rather pointless exercise."

Rick Swan reviewed Heroes' Lorebook in brief for Dragon magazine #235 (November 1996). Swan commented on the usefulness of the book's content to players: "With so much history to digest, casual players may feel overwhelmed. But if you take the Realms seriously, and names like Alias and Drizzt Do'Urden make your pulse quicken, welcome to nirvana."
