= The Book of Lairs =

Dungeons & Dragons supplement

- Author: Jim Ward and Michael Breault
- Genre: Role-playing game
- Publisher: TSR
- Publication date: 1986
- Media type: Print (Perfect bound)

The Book of Lairs is an accessory book for the Dungeons & Dragons fantasy role-playing game, first published by TSR in 1986. It contains an assortment of monster-themed mini-adventures. A second volume was published in 1987. TSR coded the accessories REF3 and REF4 respectively, as part of a series of similarly-coded accessories. Both volumes were received well by critics, with the second being seen more positively than the first.

== Publication history ==
The Book of Lairs was first published for the Dungeons & Dragons game system by TSR in 1986 as a ninety-six page volume. Michael Breault and Jim Ward designed the original, which had a cover by Clyde Caldwell.

The Book of Lairs II was published by TSR in 1987, also as a ninety-six page volume. The authors included David Cook, Jennell Jaquays (Note: Credited as Paul Jaquays.), Anne Gray McCready, Bruce Nesmith, Jeff O'Hare, and Steve Perrin, and it featured a cover by Larry Elmore.

== Contents ==
The Book of Lairs contains a series of one- and two-page adventures centered around various Advanced Dungeons & Dragons game monsters. There are more than sixty short scenarios, indexed by type of monster and terrain, designed to added to campaigns or other adventures.

The original The Book of Lairs presents detailed lairs of various monsters taken from the AD&D Monster Manual, Fiend Folio, Monster Manual II, and Oriental Adventures books. Each mini-scenario includes a brief encounter with the creatures, which is designed to be used as a short adventure or as part of a campaign, at the Dungeon Master's (DM's) discretion. Each also has an introduction detailing basic information about the type of terrain, appropriate total level for the party, and pertinent experience points rewards involved, plus rumors designed to get the location to the attention of the player characters. In addition to the monster lairs, there are a few Non-player character hideouts. The majority of the encounters are intended for parties of 3rd-7th level, although some are intended for any level, and a few are for as high as 12th level.

The Book of Lairs II contains more than sixty short scenarios organized in the same way as the first book, and designed to be ready to use as part of wilderness or other campaign encounters, and also makes use of monsters from Oriental Adventures. The encounters are all classified by type of terrain, each one starting with information including recommended level of the party and suggestions for experience point rewards. Seven of the encounters are designed for use with Oriental Adventures and the rest are for designed for ordinary AD&D campaigns, designed for a similar range of party levels as the first volume. Each encounter gives possible terrain, party level minimum, experience points, set up, and lair deployment.

Both books feature monsters ranging from commonly used types, such as orcs, trolls, goblins, and dwarves, to more obscure and exotic creatures, such as hybsils, shedus, remorhazes, and otyughs.

== Reception ==
In a review of the first edition for White Dwarf, Graeme Davis observed that the volume lacked maps, and would thus require additional preparation by the Dungeon Master before use. He noted that the encounters range from the fairly straightforward, such as encountering one bear, to the "positively frightening," such as one with 876 Undead creatures. He stated that although the volume had weaknesses, such as some of the encounters feeling a little "random," it was overall a worthwhile volume.

In a similar review of the second volume, Davis said that the first thing he noticed was the "impressive credits list" that the book contained. His first impression was that it was "more of the same" kind of material as the first edition. He was disappointed by the artwork, with the exception of the cover, saying that there was very little of it, and almost all of it came from old sources. However, Davis felt that the second volume was an improvement in many ways: "The encounters look good for the most part, with none of the '876 Undead' excesses of BoL I. [...] The encounters struck me as better planned and with more good ideas than many of those in BoL I. This may be a result of having so many contributors - even a creative genius can't possibly write 30-odd encounters, as Ward and Breault did, and make each a gem. There are more notes on lead-ins and setting up in this volume, which cuts down on the GM's preparation work without affecting the deployability of the encounters - the only thing you are constrained by is the terrain type." Davis suggested that the volume was useful to anybody running campaigns below the tenth level, as well as those designing their own adventures.

Errol Farstad reviewed The Book of Lairs II for Polyhedron, giving it a rating of 7 out of 10. Farstad felt that it was a useful volume for anyone needing a quick set up for random encounters, or a mini-adventure to keep players entertained. He also felt there should have been more maps, but considered the explanations "fairy understandable" and commented that the DM could insert these encounters anywhere the campaign "needs a quick fix".

Ken Rolston reviewed The Book of Lairs for Dragon magazine. He felt that the encounters in the first book were conventional game problems rather than exploring of the personalities of the creatures involved, stating: "Though they might be entertaining as gaming challenges, they are short on charm and character". In comparing the two volumes, he felt that the second book benefited from having multiple authors, who wrote their adventures in different styles. He added, "The narrative values are also generally better served, with nice bits of plot, character, and setting to add flavor to the basic encounter problems. In general, not bad at all and occasionally delightful — Allen Varney's little bits in particular". According to Rolston, both books contained "oddball critters" players would never want to use, but that "you might get a kick out of seeing how a clever and dedicated soul could bring them to life." He felt the second book was handled considerably more successfully than the first on those accounts. Rolston considered both books "graphically disappointing", in that the first book "brings to mind the old days of TSR illustration—not a positive association" and that the diagrams in the second book were reused from much older books and "remarkably primitive".

Lawrence Schick, in his 1991 book Heroic Worlds, called the scenarios in the first volume "run-of-the-mill", but said that the scenarios in the second "tend to be more inspired".
