= Carrie Bebris =

American novelist

Carrie A. Bebris is an American novelist known for two fantasy novels as well as a series of mystery novels featuring Elizabeth Bennet and Fitzwilliam Darcy from Jane Austen's Pride and Prejudice. The third book in the "Mr & Mrs Darcy" series won the Daphne du Maurier Award in 2007.

== Early life and education ==
Carrie Bebris grew up in Toledo, Ohio, and discovered Jane Austen novels in high school after being assigned an excerpt from Sense and Sensibility. She earned a master's degree in English Literature from Marquette University.

Following graduation, Bebris worked as a college English teacher and as a reporter.

== TSR ==
Bebris joined TSR, publisher of the fantasy role-playing game Dungeons & Dragons, as an editor, and helped develop the Birthright setting while also working on the Ravenloft, Dragonlance, and Forgotten Realms worlds. Bebris also wrote three articles for Dragon.

In 1998, Bebris became a novelist when she and William W. Connors wrote the Ravenloft novel Shadowborn. In 2001, she wrote the novel adaptation for the video game Pool of Radiance: Ruins of Myth Drannor. Grzegors Szulc noted that Bebris had "ventured into the world of the Forgotten Realms for the first time. She was given the opportunity to experiment. She was given a general outline of the scenarios used in PoR:RoMD and was able to create a novel in which, while retaining the characters and setting, she creatively expanded on the themes known from the game. Bebris created a standalone work that can be read without knowledge of the game."

== Freelance writer ==
Bebris left TSR to become a freelance writer, and in 2004, she wrote Pride and Prescience, a mystery novel that featured Elizabeth Darcy (née Bennet) and her husband Fitzwilliam Darcy, both characters taken from Jane Austen's Regency novel Pride and Prejudice. When asked if it was a leap to move from fantasy to Regency, Bebris replied, "[It] wasn't as great a leap as one might think. Both the fantasy novels and the Mr. and Mrs. Darcy mysteries contain supernatural elements; the fantasy novels take place in imaginary settings where magic is real and accepted by the characters as part of their world. The Darcy mysteries take place in our own world, one where science reigns but can't quite explain everything." Library Journal called her first book one of the five best mysteries of 2004.

Bebris wrote her second Mr. and Mrs. Darcy mystery, Suspense and Sensibility in 2005, bringing Fitzwilliam and Elizabeth Darcy of "Pride and Prejudice" with the Dashwoods and Ferrars from Jane Austen's "Sense and Sensibility". The third book in the series, North by Northanger, was awarded the 2007 Daphne du Maurier Award by the Romance Writers of America. Bebris eventually wrote seven books in the Mr & Mrs Darcy series. Her seventh novel in the series, Suspicion at Sanditon, was released in 2015.

Bebris also writes remodeling articles for Better Homes and Gardens.

== Personal life ==
Bebris and her husband, Oakwood Public Safety Director Alexander Bebris, moved to Washington Township near Dayton, Ohio in 2006 with their two children. Bebris has been actively involved with the Jane Austen Society of North America, Dayton Region. Bebris was accepted into an 18-day residency at Ragdale in March 2016, and was one of only 13 artists at the site at the time of her residency.

== Publications ==
=== Fantasy ===
- Shadowborn (1998, with William W. Connors)
- Pool of Radiance: Ruins of Myth Drannor (2001)

=== Mr. and Mrs. Darcy Mysteries ===
1. Pride and Prescience (2004)
2. Suspense and Sensibility or, First Impressions Revisited (2005)
3. North By Northanger, or The Shades of Pemberley (2006)
4. The Matters at Mansfield (2008)
5. The Intrigue at Highbury (2010)
6. The Deception at Lyme (2011)
7. The Suspicion at Sanditon (Or, The Disappearance of Lady Denham) (2015)
