= Finder's Stone =

Dungeons and Dragons novels

The Finder's Stone trilogy is a set of three novels in the Forgotten Realms setting based on the campaign setting for the Dungeons & Dragons fantasy role-playing game. The novels were all written by Kate Novak and Jeff Grubb.

== Contents ==
The novels in the trilogy are:

- Azure Bonds (1988)
- The Wyvern's Spur (1990)
- Song of the Saurials (1991)

The titular "Finder's Stone" is a magical artifact created by the bard Finder Wyvernspur, an orange gem with a core of para-elemental ice. The stone has two main functions; the ability to guide its possessor to a desired object using a beam of light, and the ability to project an illusory image of Finder performing his songs. This latter function was actually the stone's primary purpose, as Finder had become obsessed with ensuring that his works endured beyond his death.

The stone is present in all three books, though it is not central to the plot. It was ultimately destroyed by Finder when he extracted the sliver of para-elemental ice and used it to slay the god Moander.

Jeff Grubb stated that Azure Bonds is one of his favorite novels that he has written.

== Reception ==
Finder's Stone Trilogy appeared on the 2024 Game Rant "31 Best Dungeons & Dragons Novels, Ranked" list at #27.

The Finder's Stone Trilogy appeared on the 2025 Screen Rant "10 Best Forgotten Realms Book Series, Ranked" list at #5.
