= Pools of Darkness =

1991 video game

- Cover art by Keith Parkinson
- Developers: Strategic Simulations; MicroMagic (Amiga); Marionette (PC-98)
- Publishers: Strategic Simulations; Pony Canyon (PC-98)
- Designers: Ken Humphries; David Shelley
- Composers: George Sanger; David Govett
- Series: Gold Box
- Platforms: MS-DOS, Mac, Amiga, PC-98
- Release: NA: 1991 (MS-DOS); NA: 1992 (Amiga, Mac); JP: March 19, 1993 (PC-98)
- Genres: Role-playing game, tactical RPG
- Mode: Single-player

Pools of Darkness is a role-playing video game published by Strategic Simulations in 1991. It is the fourth (and final) entry in the Pool of Radiance series of Gold Box games, and the story is a continuation of the events of the third game, Secret of the Silver Blades. Like the previous games in the series, it is set in the Forgotten Realms, a campaign setting from Dungeons & Dragons. Players must stop an invasion from an evil god, eventually traveling to other dimensions to confront his lieutenants.

The cover art and introduction screen shows female drow though it is unclear who in the gameworld they represent. The novel Pools of Darkness, loosely based on the game, was released in 1992.

== Story ==
The party starts their adventure in the city of Phlan, charged with the task to safely escort Council Member Sasha on a diplomatic mission. Upon leaving the city, Lord Bane, along with four of his lieutenants, claims the entire land of Faerûn as his own, and magically teleports, destroys, and removes many cities off the face of the land.

The goal of the game is to systematically restore order to the realms by destroying Bane's minions one by one, and returning light and order to the land plunged in darkness.

== Gameplay ==
To play Pools of Darkness, one simply needs to create characters and form a party. The gameplay basics are identical to all games in the series. The game does come with a pre-designed party, but many players prefer to create their own characters. One can modify the appearance and some colors of the character's combat icon and then name the character. A maximum of six characters may be added to the party and it's highly recommended to use all six spaces as the game does not give any handicaps for smaller parties. Non-player characters sometimes join the party in the game, making it possible to have more than six characters. Characters can also be transferred from Secret of the Silver Blades.

The party's objective is to defeat Bane's lieutenants Thorne (an ancient red dragon), Kalistes (a Marilith), and Tanetal (a Glabrezu) and acquire the items they possess. The ultimate goal is to reach Bane's Land and face off against Bane's last and greatest lieutenant, Gothmenes (a Balor). All of the lieutenants are found in other dimensions, which can be reached using portals known as Pools of Darkness.

Traveling through the pools can cause many types of items the characters are holding to be permanently destroyed and lost. The party may opt to leave these items in a vault to save them. Any items from the dimensions will suffer this same fate when traveling back to the realms. Some very powerful magic items and all non-magical items can survive the trip.

There are also many side quests the party can do along the way, which can help the party in gaining experience and items, especially early on. There are many unmarked areas on the overworld the party can enter, which can be found if the player looks around the open fields for any such places. This is true of all the overworlds.

=== Quests ===
The mandatory quests involve:

- Clearing the Steading near Dragonhorn's Gap, which opens the way to the Dragon's Aerie.
- Clearing the Dragon's Aerie, which opens the way to Thorne's Cave via a Pool of Darkness.
- Clearing Thorne's Cave, which will give the party the Horn of Doom.
- Clearing the drow caves and Kalistes' Temple under Zhentil Keep, which opens the way to Kalistes' Land via a Pool of Darkness.
- Clearing Kalistes' Parlor, which will give the party the Crystal Ring.
- Clearing the red tower of Marcus, which opens the way to Moander's body via a Pool of Darkness.
- Clearing the heart of Moander where Tanetal resides, which will give the party the Talisman of Bane.
- Clearing Arcam's Cave under Mulmaster, which opens the way to Bane's Land via a Pool of Darkness.
- Finally, clearing Bane's Land and defeating Gothmenes, who then battles Elminster.

There are also side quests in several places, and famous people in the realm too. For example, Elminster was always there to maintain the dimensional portal for the party should they arrive at any Pool of Darkness. The lost princess Alusair Nacacia will ask the party to help her to fight Rakshasas in Myth Drannor. Lastly, after finishing the final quest, the party had the option to either end their journey or go through one more dungeon of enemies and traps, known as "Dave's Challenge".

== Features ==
Pools of Darkness differed from its predecessors in a number of ways. Unlike other Forgotten Realms Gold Box games where the party always stayed in Faerûn, the quests that the party have to endure traversed many dimensions to do battle with Bane's lieutenants. These include Thorne's Cave, Kalistes' Land, a visit to then sleeping Moander's colossus body in Astral Plane, and finally Bane's Land itself in Acheron.

Mages have the ability to get up to level 9 spells (the maximum). A popular spell available in this game is the Delayed Blast Fireball, which can cause damage to many targets at once. Unlike Secret of the Silver Blades, the fireball cannot be delayed and is cast immediately.

Pools of Darkness followed its predecessors closely in terms of structure. The party could have a maximum of six adventurers (with two extra slots for NPCs). Characters had the ability to advance to level 40.

Combat in Pools of Darkness, especially late in the story, differed greatly from the encounters of the previous games. The player's characters faced some of the toughest creatures in the AD&D universe, in addition to a number of new and formidable critters created specifically for the game, such as the Pets of Kalistes (intelligent magic spiders that can see invisible enemies and whose venomous bite had a -2 save) and the Minions of Bane (which have the magic resistances of demons and the breath weapons of dragons).

The game was by far the most extensive of any of the series, in storyline depth and possibilities of advancement and equipment. The game also featured better graphics at the time as it supported VGA 256 colors instead of 16. Another minor difference is the font used in the game is less stylish, but easier to read.

== Differences between versions ==
In the Amiga version, scrolls could be joined into bundles, while the MS-DOS version didn't feature this option. Also games could be loaded in the camp menu of the Amiga version. MS-DOS users had to restart or enter a training hall and remove all their characters from the party to load a game.

== Game credits ==
- Game creation: SSI Special Projects Group
- Developer: Ken Humphries, Dave Shelley
- IBM Programmers: Russ Brown, Jim Jennings, Kerry Bonin
- Music: "The Fat Man", Dave Govett
- Testers: Phil Alne, John Kirk, Andre Vrignaud, Brian Lowe, Alan Marenco, Glen Cureton, Mike Balajadia
- Artists: Maurine Starkey, Richard Payne, Fred Butts, Jean Xiong, Mike Provenza, Cyrus Harris, Ed Trillo, Kevin Thompson, Laura Bowen, Mike Nowak, Mark Johnson
- Encounter Authors: Chris Carr, Ken Eklund, Lori White, Tom Ono, Gary Shockley, Dave Georgeson, Cynthia Hwang

== Reception ==
Pools of Darkness was much less successful than the first Gold Box games, with SSI selling 52,793 copies. Pools of Darkness was reviewed in 1992 in Dragon #178 by Hartley, Patricia, and Kirk Lesser in "The Role of Computers" column. The reviewers gave the game 5 out of 5 stars. In Computer Gaming World, Scorpia found the game enjoyable, with better graphics than in the prior Gold Box games. She criticized the "lame ending", annoying sounds, and having to abandon weapons when visiting another dimension, but called Pools of Darkness "the best of the lot" and "the ultimate challenge for the experienced Gold Box gamer".

Jim Trunzo reviewed Pools of Darkness in White Wolf #31 (May/June, 1992) and stated that "The system is cleaner, quicker, easier to understand and better to look at and listen to. The adventure's plot is deep and believable, its scope is large and varied, and its monsters numerous and deadly. What more can a guy (or girl) ask for?"

According to GameSpy, while "not remembered as the most memorable of the Forgotten Realms Gold Box games, but it was definitely worth playing back then, if you braved the previous three installments".

== See also ==
- Pool of Twilight, the sequel in the "Pools" book trilogy
- Queen of the Spiders, the D&D supermodule whose cover art by Keith Parkinson was borrowed for the Pools of Darkness box art
