= Michael Breault =

American game designer and editor

- Born: Michael Breault; May 28, 1958 (age 68); Central Falls, Rhode Island, U.S.
- Occupations: Game designer; editor
- Spouse: Mary Elsbury
- Children: Chris (1986), Amelia (1989)
- Writing career
- Genre: Role-playing games

Michael Breault (born May 28, 1958 in Central Falls, Rhode Island) is a game designer and editor, and an author of multiple products for the Dungeons & Dragons fantasy role-playing game from TSR.

== Early life and education ==
Mike Breault was born in Central Falls, Rhode Island on May 28, 1958. As a young child, Breault lived in the Boston and Cape Cod areas, but his family moved to Warwick, Rhode Island when he began grade school. Breault developed an interest in science fiction and fantasy early in his childhood, and read The Hobbit at age eight. Breault commented: "I didn't read the trilogy for three more years. I was afraid I wouldn't like it as much. I was right, but I still enjoyed it." Breault developed an interest in astronomy in high school, later earning a degree in physics and an astronomy minor from Rensselaer Polytechnic Institute (RPI) in 1980. Breault was introduced to fantasy gaming at the end of his freshman year at RPI: "I joined a game club that had about 40 people in it. We played lots of D&D games, miniatures games, and Diplomacy. However, disaster struck the club in my sophomore year — about half the club flunked out of school because they played games so much. The real hard-core players played all weekend and several hours each night. They were bound to flunk out."

Breault attended Indiana University's graduate Astronomy program from 1980 through 1984. As an associate instructor, Breault also taught astronomy courses on television that were broadcast to the regional campuses of Indiana University. Breault met Mary Elsbury at the university in 1982, and a couple of years later, they were married. During grad school, Breault spent a year as an editorial intern for The American Spectator.

== Career ==
In 1984, Breault noticed an ad in the Chicago Tribune for a position on the editorial staff at TSR, Inc., "Mary and I were at Marriott's Great America [an amusement park north of Chicago] and picked up a copy of the newspaper. The classifieds had the TSR ad, so I immediately put my resume together, and I was hired in September of that year." In late July 1986, the Breaults' first child, Christopher Michael Breault was born. On January 3, 1989, their second child, Amelia Katherine Breault, was born.

Breault edited first edition Advanced Dungeons & Dragons books including Oriental Adventures, Dungeoneer's Survival Guide, and the original Manual of the Planes, as well as most of the early Dragonlance adventure modules. He also edited the second edition Player's Handbook. Breault and Jim Ward designed The Book of Lairs.

In 1988, Breault co-designed the original Pool of Radiance computer game. In five years at TSR, he wrote, edited, and developed over 90 games, modules, and hardback books.

Breault left TSR in 1989 to start a freelance career. Initially continuing work with TSR, Breault gradually shifted over into computer and video games. His video game work started with re-writing the translated script, and writing the included hint-book for the 1989 Sega Genesis game Sword of Vermilion, as well as other role-playing games for the Genesis, plus Robin Hood: Prince of Thieves for the NES, among other games and platforms. His freelance career spanned 10 years, from 1989 to 1998, living with his family (plus hypoallergenic dog Rags) in Warsaw, Indiana.

In 1999, he was hired by Volition, Inc. in Champaign, IL as a writer and designer for their computer games. From 1999 to 2008, Mike wrote and designed for several Volition games, including Freespace 2, Red Faction, Red Faction 2, The Punisher, and Red Faction: Guerrilla. In 2008, Mike left Volition to work at Raven Software in Madison, WI. While there he worked on Wolfenstein and a canceled James Bond-related product. Mike has also worked at Ubisoft Montreal, 38 Studios, and ZeniMax Online.

Breault lives in Kirkwood, Missouri and teaches game and narrative design at Webster University.

=== Works ===
Michael Breault designed the module Ruins of Adventure. While working for TSR from 1985 to 1989 (and freelance from 1989 to 1995), he edited and developed over 90 books, modules, and boxed games, including items for the Dragonlance, Forgotten Realms, Greyhawk, Ravenloft, and Dark Sun settings, among others.

Breault, with Jim Ward, David Cook, and Steve Winter, co-designed the first Gold Box PC game Pool of Radiance.

Thus far during his career in computer and video games, Breault has been crediting with writing and/or designing almost 40 games.
