= Pool of Radiance: Ruins of Myth Drannor =

2001 video game

- Cover art by Gerald Brom
- Developer: Stormfront Studios
- Publisher: Ubi Soft
- Designers: Mark Buchignani; Ken Eklund; Sarah W. Stocker
- Programmer: David Yee
- Artist: Sergio Lobato
- Writer: Sarah W. Stocker
- Composers: Andrew Boyd; Robb Mills
- Series: Pool of Radiance
- Platform: Windows
- Release: NA: September 25, 2001; EU: November 30, 2001
- Genre: Role-playing
- Modes: Single-player, multiplayer

Pool of Radiance: Ruins of Myth Drannor is a Forgotten Realms Dungeons & Dragons role-playing video game developed by Stormfront Studios and published by Ubi Soft in 2001. It is the fifth and latest game in the Pool of Radiance series.

== Gameplay ==
In-game scene

Ruins of Myth Drannor takes place from an isometric third-person perspective, similar to the Baldur's Gate series. Unlike Baldur's Gate and other Infinity Engine games, Ruins of Myth Drannor features turn-based combat rather than real-time combat. The game uses three-dimensional characters over pre-rendered two-dimensional backgrounds.

The game is a dungeon crawl, with a focus on hack and slash combat and the exploration of large dungeons. Story progression and interaction with other characters is a minimal part of the game, although there is some interaction with non-player characters (NPCs) and other in-game characters.

== Plot ==
The story is set in the city of New Phlan. A dracolich and his sorcerer queen have seized control of the Mythal, the ancient magic that once protected the long abandoned elven city of Myth Drannor. Once the elven ruin is completely in their thrall, the cult intends to expand its domination one city—and one soul—at a time.

Athan's band of heroes are sent to Myth Drannor by Elminster to stop the dracolich Pelendralaar and the sorcerer queen Kya Mordrayn from using the power of the Mythal to conquer Faerûn. The player party is composed of some of the various volunteers assigned to defend Faerun against the appearance of spawn pools which are extensions of a pool of radiance. The player's party of heroes witness the appearance of a magical portal before them and hear a man crying for help, they enter the portal and arrive some time later at the ruins of Myth Drannor. The player must acquire the gauntlets of Moander (which were given by Elminster to Athan's band) in order to destroy the newly formed pool of radiance. The heroes must locate and acquire the gauntlets of Moander and they must learn the correct word of power to open them. They must then find the ring of calling in order to open the seal of Mythanthor so that they may escape the dungeons of Myth Drannor and enter the other parts of the city such as Windrider glade.

The Baelnorn Mirroden Silverblade tells the party that the gem of the weave has been destroyed and that Kya Mordrayn will lose control of the Mythal if a new gem of the weave is attuned. The party then enlists the aid of ancient elf priestess Annorweyn Elvensong to attune a new gem of the weave but discovers that this cannot be done as the original gem of the weave is still intact. Mirroden is confronted by Annorweyn and the heroes learn that the gem of the weave is still intact and is in possession of the cult who have established the new pool of radiance beneath the ruins of castle Cormanthor. The party then traverse the catacombs and enter castle Cormanthor eventually reaching the pool of radiance through a magic portal. Kya Mordrayn is slain, the gem of the weave is destroyed and Pelendralaar breaks through a cave wall and enters into the chamber of the pool of radiance. The heroes slay Pelendraalar and use the gauntlets of Moander to destroy the pool.

== Development ==
Producer Chuck Yager said the game was originally designed using the Advanced Dungeons & Dragons 2nd edition rules, but was converted to the 3rd edition rules partway through development. While Baldur's Gate II: Shadows of Amn implemented some elements from the 3rd edition, Ruins of Myth Drannor was the first game attempting to comprehensively adapt those rules. The game was originally scheduled to be released in May 2001.

== Reception ==
=== Sales ===
According to GameSpot's Desslock, Ruins of Myth Drannor "sold extremely well during its first few weeks, but bad word of mouth and reviews crippled future sales". He remarked that certain retailers had placed notes on their displays to warn customers about the title's bugs. In the United States, the game entered NPD Intelect's computer game sales chart at #1 for September 23–29, 2001. It held this position on the following week's chart, before falling to #9 in its third week of release. According to Ubisoft, the game surpassed 150,000 sales in its first 14 days. It finished 20th on NPD Intelect's chart for the month of September overall, and maintained this spot in October. By the first week of November, Ruins of Myth Drannor had sold 55,211 units in the United States.

=== Critical reviews ===
Reception

Review scores
Publication	Score
Computer Games Magazine	2/5
Computer Gaming World	1/5
Game Informer	7.75/10
PC Gamer (US)	59%
PC PowerPlay	79%

The game received lackluster reviews and was plagued with bugs. One major bug would cause a player's system files to uninstall when the game was removed. Other bugs included problems with installation, saving game files, graphics, and gameplay. Chris Chan of the New Straits Times complained that most of the game is spent "[engaged] with a lot of mindless battles and health and spell recuperation exercises". Mark Meadows of The Wisconsin State Journal called the game "a half-finished adaptation of D&D's new 3rd Edition rules that was rushed out the door despite being over a year late". GameSpy gave a negative review to the game. Later patches fixed some of the stability issues. Branislav Babovic of mania.com commented: "Pool of Radiance: Ruins of Myth Drannor could simply be defined as a disk full of bugs, striving to be a slow Diablo based on AD&D third edition rules". Johnny Wilson for Dragon commented: "I like the way the new edition of the D&D rules have been integrated into the game [...] I'm thrilled with the emphasis on drow and undead, the villains we love to hate".

== Adaptations ==
Carrie Bebris wrote a novel based on the game, which was published by Wizards of the Coast and was also included with the collector's edition of the game, except in Europe. The Collector's Edition version of the game contained a copy of the book, an original pen and paper module, an audio CD, and a bag of polyhedral dice. The printed adventure was called Pool of Radiance: Attack on Myth Drannor.
