= Tempest Feud =

2002 adventure by Jeff Grubb and Owen K.C. Stephens

Tempest Feud is an adventure written by Jeff Grubb and Owen K.C. Stephens for the d20 System version of the Star Wars Roleplaying Game. It was published by Wizards of the Coast in March 2002 for the original edition of the game, two months before the revised edition was released. The adventure revolves around various dealings with the Hutts and consists of three acts.

Tempest Feud is suitable for any era of the Star Wars Roleplaying Game and intended for 9th-level characters. Playing through the three acts of the adventure takes roughly twelve sessions according to the book, and more if the two intermissions are given focus as well. Tempest Feud is the first adventure published for the Star Wars Roleplaying Game. The adventure's storyline is adapted to fit in any era—except for the Yuuzhan Vong invasion in the New Jedi Order era—and doesn't conflict with any of the movies, making it very flexible. In addition, the book contains several sidebars providing contingency plans for dealing with unexpected storyline twists.

== Plot summary ==
Note: The following summary is not a definite description of how the adventure may play out, but rather the path most supported in the Tempest Feud book.

=== Act One ===
Regardless of which era the adventure is set in, the heroes are hired by the Hutt Popara of the Anjiliac clan to locate and retrieve his son Mika, who has gone missing. They are either offered the highly sought-after coordinates through the Indrexu Spiral in the Tion Cluster if they work for an organization or a financial reward if they are freelancers. Mika went missing after the planet Endregaad was quarantined by the Corporate Sector Authority following the outbreak of a lethal plague, and has not been heard from since.

The heroes are granted a ship and travel to Endregaad with a shipment of medicinal spice to show Popara’s goodwill toward the Corporate Sector Authority. Upon reaching the Joxin system, where Endregaad is located, the heroes deliver the spice to Lieutenant Commander Angela Krin of the Corporate Sector Authority, but are not allowed to land on the planet. Despite this, they run the blockade and hide their ship on Endregaad. In the planet's capital, Tel Bollin, they learn that a new type of spice called tempest is being sold across the planet. Tempest makes its users fly into berserker rages and is highly addictive. They also meet Orgamon, one of Mika's Nikto bodyguards, who informs them that the Hutt can be found north of the city, in a place called Temple Valley.

The heroes travel to Temple Valley with a caravan of Humans and reach the small community to find that Mika is further to the north, examining a freighter that crashed a matter of weeks ago. Arriving at the scene, the heroes find the lost Hutt and are soon attacked by raiders searching for tempest spice. After defeating their attackers, the heroes run the blockade yet again, and return with Mika to his father, to Popara's great joy and gratitude.

=== Act Two ===
A couple of months after the events in Act One, the heroes are invited to a dinner in Popara’s home on Nar Shaddaa to discuss a few "loose ends" from their adventure on Endregaad. At the banquet, Popara the Hutt asks the heroes to investigate the rising number of tempest addicts in Hutt Space. Popara is later killed from food poisoning as the heroes are talking to him. They are accused of killing the Hutt and escape into the lower levels of Nar Shaddaa. Mika vanishes and Popara's other son, Zonnos, takes over the clan.

In a cantina on Nar Shaddaa, the heroes find Mika and join up with him, and he takes them to see a contact of his—Angela Krin of the Corporate Sector Authority, whom they met in Act One. She has provided them with a cargo skiff to help in their escape from Nar Shaddaa. They are also contacted by Vago the Hutt, Popara's assistant, who doesn’t believe that they killed Popara, and offers them a ship to leave the planet with. When they enter the docking bay, they are attacked by Zonnos's guards. Mika and a couple of the heroes are captured and brought to Zonnos. The remaining heroes manage to escape with the Evocii, a species living in the depths of Nar Shaddaa.

A while later, they find out via a holorecording that their companions are about to be executed, and hurry to Popara’s former home to rescue them. They find that Zonnos is addicted to tempest and fight him and his guards, resulting in the death of Zonnos and the freeing of their companions. Meanwhile, Mika has used his secret Force powers to escape his cell. With Zonnos dead, Mika takes over the clan and thanks the heroes for their help.

=== Act Three ===
Between acts two and three, tempest has spread to all corners of the galaxy and begun corrupting entire urban populations. Roughly two months after the death of Zonnos, the heroes are contacted by Angela Krin, who has found that the Endregaad Plague is very similar to a virus native to Varl, the Hutt homeworld. In addition, if exposed to common spice, the Varl virus turns into tempest spice. Krin suspects that the tempest spice is manufactured on Varl and wants the heroes to investigate the matter for her. She informs the heroes that a ship called Barabi Run is used for spice shipment to Varl. Krin wants the heroes to capture it and find the tempest's manufacturing plant so that they can destroy it.

The heroes capture Barabi Run and find out that the manufacturing plant is on Varl. They travel in secret to that planet and locate the plant, which is fact a starship named "Tempest". They manage to rescue Vago the Hutt, who has a neural scrambler attached to the back of his head by Mika. The neural scrambler forces him to obey the commands given to him by one of Popara's Twi'lek Force adepts, who now serves Mika. They proceed to the ship's bridge to find Mika, who explains that he was the mastermind behind the tempest spice all along. The heroes defeat Mika and his guards as Tempest takes off for a hyperspace jump. Assisted by a couple of their companions left behind to guard the heroes' ship, they manage to destroy the tempest manufacturing ship before it leaves the system, while the heroes on Tempest escape in escape pods.

Vago the Hutt, free from Mika's captivity, now takes over Popara's former clan himself and thanks the heroes for their help.

== Trivia ==
- Co-author Jeff Grubb said in the online interview "Hutts Are Fun!" that one of his nieces is an expert on Hutts, and particularly knowledgeable about Zorba the Hutt, the father of Jabba the Hutt.
- Additionally, co-author Owen K.C. Stephens said in the online interview "An Interview That You Can't Refuse" that he researched real-world organized crime in order to flesh out the Hutt clans featured in Tempest Feud. The Mafia in particular was a source of inspiration on how to describe Hutt organizations.
- One of the proposed titles for Tempest Feud was A Night on Nar Shaddaa, which ended up being slightly modified and used as the name of the adventure's second act, "Night on Nar Shaddaa."

== See also ==
- Star Wars Roleplaying Game (Wizards of the Coast)

== Reviews ==
- Pyramid
