= Curse of the Azure Bonds (module) =

Dungeons & Dragons adventure module

- Code: FRC2
- Rules required: AD&D 2nd Edition
- Character levels: 6 to 9
- Campaign setting: Forgotten Realms
- Authors: Jeff Grubb
- First published: 1989
- Pages: 93+3
- ISBN: 0-88038-606-1

Linked modules
- FRC1, FRC2

Curse of the Azure Bonds is an adventure module published in 1989 for the Dungeons & Dragons fantasy role-playing game.

== Plot summary ==
Curse of the Azure Bonds is a Forgotten Realms adventure scenario based on the computer game Curse of the Azure Bonds, in which the player characters seek to remove magical tattoos from their bodies; this ties in with the novel Azure Bonds as well.

== Publication history ==
FRC2 Curse of the Azure Bonds was written by Jeff Grubb and published by TSR in 1989 as a 96-page book.

== Reception ==
Curse of the Azure Bonds is a Gamer's Choice award-winner.
