= Pool of Radiance: Attack on Myth Drannor =

Book by Sean K. Reynolds

- Rules required: Dungeons & Dragons, 3rd edition
- Character levels: 6th
- Authors: Sean K Reynolds
- First published: June 2001

Pool of Radiance: Attack on Myth Drannor is an adventure module for the 3rd edition of the Dungeons & Dragons fantasy role-playing game.

== Plot summary ==
Pool of Radiance: Attack on Myth Drannor takes place in the Forgotten Realms setting. The Cult of the Dragon has built a secret stronghold in the ruins of Myth Drannor, and seeks to subjugate Faerûn using the power of a corrupted pool of radiance.

== Publication history ==
Pool of Radiance: Attack on Myth Drannor was published in June 2001, and was written by Sean K Reynolds. The cover art was painted by Brom and interior art was by Ted Beargeon and Vince Locke. It is a softcover release, which was unusual for third edition books.

The adventure is a tie-in to the video game Pool of Radiance: Ruins of Myth Drannor, which released that September. The rear cover acknowledges this, and states that it can be played as a standalone or alongside the video game.

== Reception ==
Vintage RPG offered the adventure a mixed reception in 2024.
