= Song of the Saurials =

1991 novel written by Kate Novak and Jeff Grubb

- Cover of the first edition
- Author: Kate Novak and Jeff Grubb
- Cover artist: Clyde Caldwell
- Language: English
- Series: Finders Stone Trilogy
- Genre: Fantasy Novel
- Publisher: TSR, Inc.
- Publication date: March 1991
- Publication place: United States
- Media type: Print (Paperback)
- Pages: 315
- ISBN: 1-56076-060-5
- OCLC: 23818925
- Preceded by: The Wyvern's Spur
- Followed by: Masquerades

Song of the Saurials is a 313-page Forgotten Realms paperback fantasy novel published by TSR Inc. in 1991, written by Kate Novak and Jeff Grubb.

== Plot ==
This novel is the final book of the Finders Stone Trilogy. Akabar bel Akash has visions that the god Moander is returning to the Realms, so he brings the band of adventurers back together again to counter this threat.

== Characters ==
- Alias
- Olive Ruskettle
- Akabar bel Akash
- Dragonbait
- Finder Wyvernspur
- Grypht
- Elminster
- Moander

== Reception ==
One reviewer called the book "a serviceable but ultimately disappointing finale to what was otherwise an excellent couple of books." The reviewer pointed to the clichéd start to the novel, and the use of exposition to reveal the plot as the weakest parts of the book. Other concerns were the slow pace as the point of view switches back and forth from various groups of protagonists, and the use of the magical finder's stone as a deus ex machina device. The reviewer concluded by giving the book a grade of C, saying, "the execution is just so flat and sloppy that I can’t help but wonder what went wrong here. A pity, really."

On the RPG.net site, readers have given this book an aggregate rating of 5.00 out of 10, ranking it #12,814th; both of these are significantly lower than the first two books of the Finder's Stone trilogy.

== See also ==
- Azure Bonds - 1st Book in Finders Stone Trilogy
- The Wyvern's Spur - 2nd Book in Finders Stone Trilogy
- Masquerades, a follow-on sequel depicting the further adventures of the Azure Bonds main characters.
