= Kate Novak =

American fantasy author

- Education: University of Pittsburgh (B.Sc.)
- Occupation: Writer
- Spouse: Jeff Grubb (m. 1983)

Kate Novak is an American fantasy author.

== Biography ==
Novak grew up in Pittsburgh, Pennsylvania where she graduated from the University of Pittsburgh with a BS in chemistry.

She primarily published in the Forgotten Realms and Ravenloft shared worlds.

She is married to writer and game designer Jeff Grubb. Novak and Grubb are co-authors of the best-selling Finder's Stone Trilogy, and collaborated on the book Azure Bonds. The success of the book resulted in the creation of the computer game, Curse of the Azure Bonds.

== Bibliography ==
- The Finder's Stone Trilogy (with Jeff Grubb)
  - Azure Bonds (1988), ISBN 0-88038-612-6
  - The Wyvern's Spur (1990), ISBN 0-88038-902-8
  - Song of the Saurials (1991), ISBN 1-56076-060-5
- The Harpers (with Jeff Grubb)
  - Book 10: Masquerades (1995), ISBN 0-7869-0152-7
  - Book 15: Finder's Bane (1997), ISBN 0-7869-0658-8
- The Lost Gods (with Jeff Grubb)
  - Tymora's Luck (1997), sequel to Finder's Bane, ISBN 0-7869-0726-6
