= The Wyvern's Spur =

1990 novel written by Kate Novak and Jeff Grubb

- Cover of the first edition
- Author: Kate Novak & Jeff Grubb
- Cover artist: Clyde Caldwell
- Language: English
- Series: Finders Stone Trilogy
- Genre: Fantasy novel
- Publisher: TSR, Inc.
- Publication date: February 1990
- Publication place: United States
- Media type: Print (Paperback)
- Pages: 313 pp
- ISBN: 0-88038-902-8
- OCLC: 21376402
- Dewey Decimal: 813/.54 20
- LC Class: PS3564.O894 W97 1990
- Preceded by: Azure Bonds
- Followed by: Song of the Saurials

The Wyvern's Spur is a fantasy novel by Kate Novak and Jeff Grubb that was originally published in 1990. It is the second novel in the Finder’s Stone Trilogy which is set within the world of the Forgotten Realms. This novel received 4 stars from OtherRealms.

The novel focuses on a clumsy but well-meaning young nobleman whose designs on a return to normal town life are interrupted when he stumbles into an ancestral vendetta and rediscovers a family legacy.

== Plot introduction ==
The Wyvernspurs are a noble family within the Kingdom of Cormyr and the provincial town of Immersea has been their ancestral residence. The novel centers around Giogioni “Giogi” Wyvernspur and begins with his homecoming after a lengthy ten-month absence.

With billing as a sequel to Azure Bonds, it nonetheless includes the participation of only one main character from the preceding novel. Giogi himself did play a role in events of the first novel but was effectively only a recurring supporting character. Unlike its predecessor, the events of the novel take place over the span of only a few days and occur entirely within a single locale. Additionally, the novel contains a strong romantic component.

Song of the Saurials is the third book in the Finders Stone Trilogy.

== Plot summary ==
Most of the novel revolves around Giogi's efforts to locate and recover an important family heirloom that goes missing just as he is returning to Immersea. The lost heirloom is an artifact from which they take their family name; the wyvern's spur, and the chief initial motivation for its recovery is the omen that the spur's loss will trigger family misfortune. This is underscored when an elder family member, the wizard Drone, is discovered dead and a twisted mage named Flattery makes his presence known.

Giogi is aided in his efforts by Olive Ruskettle, a female halfling, and a female apprentice mage named Cat.

As the story progresses it is revealed that Cat is actually Flattery's agent (under duress) and that Flattery himself is an un-aging creation of a forgotten ancestor named Finder Wyvernspur. Flattery, for reasons left vague, possesses an intense hatred of anything connected with Finder's legacy including his descendants.

Eventually, Giogi convinces Cat to leave Flattery and the two fall in love. Giogi relearns much of the repressed history of his family and uses this knowledge to defeat Flattery and restore the family's good heritage.

=== The Wyvern's spur ===
The wyvern's spur is literally a mummified “wyvern's spur” (a talon). It is described once by Giogi as being “no larger than a zucchini and uglier than a three-week-old sausage.” The spur was bestowed generations earlier to Paton, the founder of the family line, by a grateful Wyvern whose spirit then remained as an entity known as the Guardian. In recent years the spur has come to be known more as a family heirloom than its qualities as a magical artifact

The spur confers the ability to transform into a large wyvern as well as immunity to magic. It can only be wielded by a member of the Wyvernspur line and even then its powers can only be harnessed by a chosen member. A chosen or “favorite” is designated by the Guardian roughly once each generation.

== Characters in The Wyvern's Spur ==
Giogioni Wyvernspur
Giogi, as he is commonly known, is a simple but good natured young nobleman who is often varyingly dismissed or derided by his peers due to his propensity for ineptitude. Giogi deviates from a hereditary family trait in that, unlike other Wyvernspur menfolk who share extreme physical resemblance with one another, his looks are distinctly unique.

Olive Ruskettle
Olive is a female halfling who is coincidentally herself in Immersea with a companion named Jade, who bears a near identical physical resemblance to the swordswoman Alias. Shortly thereafter Jade is killed by Flattery. Olive, motivated by both vengeance and circumstance, begins assisting Giogi in his efforts using special insight gleaned from her related experiences in a recent past adventure.

Cat
A fledgling female wizard. Cat is initially in the abusive service of the more powerful Flattery. She bears a near identical physical resemblance to the swordswoman Alias.

Flattery
A powerful mage who launches an assault against the Wyvernspur clan. He is motivated in part by the desire for the wyvern's spur as well as retribution for an ancient vendetta.

== Reception ==
- A reviewer on OtherRealms, the winner of the 1989 Hugo for Best Fanzine, stated that Wyvern's Spur was an improvement over the first novel of the Finder's Stone trilogy, Azure Bonds. The reviewer concluded that due to improved plotting and developments, this book rated 4 stars, as compared to the three stars given to Azure Bonds.
- A reviewer on Let's Read TSR! pointed out the strong similarity between this book, featuring a "foppish, foolish aristocrat with more money that sense... and his uncannily competent valet", with any Jeeves & Wooster story by P.G. Wodehouse; but the reviewer admitted that "this very unoriginality makes it original: this may be the first of the Forgotten Realms books we’ve looked at so far which veers away from the standard 'heroic fantasy' template. As a pastiche of the works of Wodehouse, it straddles the line between traditional heroic fantasy and the 'fantasy of manners', a genre which emphasizes the social aspects of the fantasy world over the action and questing and all that." The reviewer did think there were some issues with occasional bits of awkward writing, but found the pacing quite good. The reviewer thought the strongest part of the book was that "Novak and Grubb have done a good job of making the world feel like a living place, rather than just a stage where the characters play their parts." The reviewer concluded by giving the book an A grade.

In the Io9 series revisiting older Dungeons & Dragons novels, Rob Bricken commented that "So all in all this is a better, more readable novel than Azure Bonds…but I'd be lying if I didn't admit I'm kind of bummed out Alias and Dragonbait were completely missing in action."

== Cover artwork ==
The cover artist Clyde Caldwell did the cover for this novel as well as the first book of the trilogy, Azure Bonds. There is an in-joke referencing Clyde's preferred style and subject matter. In particular when the character Olive, on examining a statuette, says “…that’s an original Cledwyll. Overly endowed and scantily clad. Yes definitely a Cledwyll.”
