= James M. Ward =

American game designer and author (1951–2024)

- Born: May 23, 1951; Elkhorn, Wisconsin
- Died: March 18, 2024 (aged 72); Milwaukee
- Occupations: Writer; game designer; author
- Writing career
- Genres: Fantasy, role-playing game
- Notable works: Deities & Demigods, Greyhawk Adventures, Pool of Radiance, Metamorphosis Alpha, Gamma World

James Michael Ward III (May 23, 1951 – March 18, 2024) was an American game designer and fantasy author who worked for TSR, Inc. for more than 20 years, most notably on the role-playing game Dungeons & Dragons. He wrote various books relating to Dungeons & Dragons, including guidebooks such as Deities & Demigods, and novels including Pool of Radiance, based on the computer game of the same name.

== Early life and education ==
Jim Ward was born in Elkhorn, Wisconsin to James Ward Jr. and Orabelle Ward. He attended University of Wisconsin-Whitewater, where he earned a double major in English and History. He then moved to Prairie du Chien, Wisconsin and taught for five years at West Grant High School in Patch Grove, Wisconsin.

During this time, Ward become interested in wargaming, and was drawn into the International Federation of Wargamers (IFW) founded by Gary Gygax in nearby Lake Geneva, Wisconsin. In 1973, Gygax introduced some of the players to a new concept in wargaming — a game that would eventually become Dungeons & Dragons — where each player took on the role of one character in a fantasy setting that Gygax called Greyhawk. By the following year, Ward was one of these players, and created a wizard he named Leledibmob. (Note: An approximation of "Bombidell" (taken from Tom Bombadil in Lord of the Rings) spelled backwards.) During one session, Leledibmob urgently needed an item that he had left behind, and Gygax created a new spell that allowed Leledibmob to retrieve the item. Gygax called the spell Drawmij's Instant Summons — "Drawmij" (Note: Drawmij would later become a fictional character who appeared in some commercial TSR products set in Greyhawk.) being "Jim Ward" spelled backwards.

== Dungeons & Dragons and TSR ==
In 1974, Gygax and Don Kaye formed Tactical Studies Rules (TSR) in order to publish Dungeons & Dragons. When sales of the new game took off in 1975, TSR rapidly expanded its product line, and Ward started to design games and write material for them. In 1976, Ward worked with Rob Kuntz to produce Gods, Demi-Gods & Heroes that expanded the original D&D game by introducing gods. On his own, Ward designed Metamorphosis Alpha (1976), which was the second science-fantasy role-playing game, (Note: The first science fiction role-playing game, Starfaring, was published by Flying Buffalo in August 1976. Although the forward of Metamorphosis Alpha is dated July 1976, TSR didn't actually release the game until later in the year.) and published as TSR's fourth role-playing game.

In 1980, Ward left teaching to become a full-time employee of TSR and co-authored Deities & Demigods. In the early 1980s, Ward and Rose Estes formed an education department at TSR, planning to market classroom modules to teachers. At the 1983 EastCon convention, Ward ran Kuntz's adventure "The Maze of Xaene" as the D&D tournament module, although that module was never published by TSR.

However, in 1984, TSR faced a financial crunch due to senior mismanagement, and Ward, along with dozens of other employees, was laid off. Ward continued to write products for TSR, which paid him in royalties. In 1986, TSR hired Ward back. Ward wrote Greyhawk Adventures (1988), a hardcover supplement that presented new rules for the Greyhawk setting.

Ward, with David Cook, Steve Winter, and Mike Breault, co-wrote the Ruins of Adventure scenario that was adapted into the popular computer game Pool of Radiance.

When TSR produced a second edition of AD&D (1989), Ward instituted changes such as removing assassins and half-orcs as player character options from the game, explaining this decision in Dragon #154 (February 1990) that "[a]voiding the Angry Mother Syndrome has become a good, basic guideline for all of the designers and editors at TSR, Inc"; Ward printed many replies from upset players in Dragon #158.

Ward can be glimpsed early in the Dragon Strike tutorial video playing the man who is slapped in the face at the king's party.

Ward designed the Spellfire collectible card game. Ward was eventually made the VP for Creative Services.

In 1996, TSR suffered another financial crisis when an unanticipated number of books were returned by booksellers. Ward was ordered to lay off thirty editors and designers, but Ward instead resigned. The financial crisis would shortly result in the company being bought by Wizards of the Coast.

=== After TSR ===
Now a freelance designer, Ward created the Dragon Ball Z Collectible Card Game.

Ward then co-founded the d20 company Fast Forward Entertainment with Timothy Brown, Lester Smith, John Danovich, and Sean Everett, and from 2000 to 2005, he was president of the companyt of Fast Forward Entertainment, an independent game development company. Ward wrote Sete-Ka's Dream Quest (2006), an adventure gamebook published by Margaret Weis Productions. He wrote the Halcyon Blithe novel Dragonfrigate Wizard (Tor, 2006), which he considered one of his better and prouder creations.

Ward then joined Troll Lord Games, writing supplements such as the boxed set Towers of Adventures (2008) and the Castles & Crusades supplement Of Gods & Monsters (2009); Ward was also made the editor for their Castles & Crusades magazine, The Crusader Journal. Ward also wrote the horror fantasy game Tainted Lands (2009), based on the "SIEGE" system from Castles & Crusades.

Together with Frank Mentzer, Chris Clark and Tim Kask, Ward co-founded Eldritch Enterprises, which planned to publish a variety of general works as well as new creations for role-playing games.

Ward wrote for Gygax Magazine beginning in 2013, including a new Metamorphosis Alpha adventure "They All Died at the International Space Station," which was also released as a standalone product. Ward was co-author of GiantLands by Wonderfilled, which was announced on Kickstarter in 2019 and shipped in 2022.

== Personal life ==
In 1973, Ward married his high school sweetheart Janean M. Bray, and they had three sons together, James, Theon and Breck.

In 2010, Ward was diagnosed with a serious neurological disorder that required treatment at the Mayo Clinic. His friend Tim Kask helped to establish a fund to help Ward offset some of the medical bills.

Ward died on March 18, 2024, at the age of 72.

== Legacy ==
In 1989, Ward was inducted into the Academy of Adventure Gaming Arts & Design Hall of Fame.

== Selected works ==
=== Fiction ===
- Dragonsword of Lankhmar (TSR, 1986), a pair of gamebooks starring Fritz Leiber's Fafhrd and the Gray Mouser characters.
- Pool of Radiance, with Jane Cooper Hong, (TSR, 1989), a Forgotten Realms novel derived from the Pool of Radiance computer game.
- Pools of Darkness, with Anne K. Brown (TSR, 1992), the sequel to Pool of Radiance.
- Pool of Twilight, with Anne K. Brown (TSR, 1993), the third book in the Pool series.
- Midshipwizard Halcyon Blithe (Tor Books, 2005).
- Sete-Ka's Dream Quest (Margaret Weis Productions, 2006).
- Dragonfrigate Wizard Halcyon Blithe (Tor Books, 2006).
- Time Twisters Anthology (Daw Books, 2006).
- The Curse of Time (Margaret Weis Productions, 2007).

=== Role-playing games ===
- Metamorphosis Alpha (TSR, 1976), one of the first science fiction role-playing games.
- Gods, Demi-Gods & Heroes, with Robert J. Kuntz (TSR, 1976), one of the first four rules supplements to the original edition of Dungeons & Dragons.
- Gamma World, with Gary Jaquet (TSR, 1978), the first role-playing game in the post-apocalyptic subgenre.
- Deities & Demigods, with Robert J. Kuntz (TSR, 1980), a core rulebook for the 1st Edition of Advanced Dungeons & Dragons presenting similar material to that of Gods, Demi-Gods & Heroes. This work introduced a number of now iconic Dungeons & Dragons deities, such as Corellon Larethian, Garl Glittergold, Gruumsh, Moradin, and Yondalla.
- The Mansion of Mad Professor Ludlow (TSR, 1980) in Dragon #42.
- Metamorphosis Alpha 4th Edition (Mudpuppy Games, 2006).
- Towers of Adventure (Troll Lord Games, 2008), a digest box set for the Castles & Crusades game.
- Tainted Lands (Troll Lord Games, 2010), a dark horror themed box set expansion for the Castles & Crusades game.
- Beneath the Dome (Troll Lord Games, 2013), a serial adventure for the Castles & Crusades game.
- Gods and Monsters (Troll Lord Games, 2014), a book on gods and monsters from various mythologies for the Castles & Crusades game.
- 77 Worlds RPG (http://Firesidecreations.com, 2014), a science fiction post apocalyptic role-playing game and campaign setting using the Ward Card System (WCS). The 77 Lost Worlds RPG is part of the Apocalyptic Space series of RPGs.
- The Starship Warden (Troll Lord Games, 2021)

=== Television ===
- G.I. Joe: A Real American Hero (1985)

=== Other ===
- Dragon Ball Z Collectible Card Game.
- Westeros GAME OF THRONES Miniatures rules (2007).
- Astrobirdz Concept card game, RPG, board game, coin game, YA novels.
- My Precious Presents card game
- Dragon Lairds board game, created by Ward and Tom Wham, was published in 2008 by Margaret Weis Productions, Ltd.
- In 2008, Ward became the Managing Editor of and a contributor to The Crusader magazine published by Troll Lord Games.
