= Ruins of Adventure =

1988 role-playing game supplement

- The title page of Ruins of Adventure
- Author: Mike Breault; David Cook; Jim Ward; Steve Winter
- Illustrator: James Holloway
- Cover artist: Clyde Caldwell
- Language: English
- Subject: Roleplaying
- Genre: Roleplaying
- Publisher: TSR
- Publication date: August, or September 1988
- Publication place: United States
- Media type: Print (Paperback)
- Pages: 96
- ISBN: 978-0-88038-588-6

Ruins of Adventure is a Dungeons & Dragons module that was based on the "Gold Box" role-playing video game Pool of Radiance, published in 1988 by Strategic Simulations, Inc. (SSI). Mike Breault stated that TSR chose him, Winter, Cook, and Ward to work on the design and writing for Pool of Radiance, indicating that the material was originally created for the game. However, according to the editors of Dragon magazine, Pool of Radiance was based on Ruins of Adventure, and not vice versa. The plot loosely tracks that of the computer game.

== Plot summary ==
Ruins of Adventure contains four short Forgotten Realms adventure scenarios which are connected and adapted from the Pool of Radiance computer game, and take place in the devastated town of Phlan.

The adventurers are hired to remove evil forces from Phlan, presumably by killing them. They hear rumor of a Boss controlling them and seek him out. This Boss proves to be a worthy adversary, but in the end the adventurers defeat him.

=== Locations ===
There are various locations in the fictional city of Phlan. Each of these locations comes with a map and detailed area description. These locations include:

- Kovel Mansion
- The Slum District
- The Temple of Bane
- Kuto's Well
- Mantor's Library
- Stojanow Gate
- Podol Plaza
- The Cadorna Textile House
- Valhingen Graveyard
- Valjevo Castle
- Sorcerer's Island
- Zhentil Keep Outpost

=== Pre-generated characters ===
There are numerous pre-generated characters in this book. Monsters each have their own stats prepared and there are quite a few non-player characters.

== Publication history ==
Ruins of Adventure was written by James Ward, David "Zeb" Cook, Steve Winter, and Mike Breault, with a cover by Clyde Caldwell, and was published by TSR in 1988 as a 96-page book.
