= Pools of Darkness (novel) =

1992 novel

- First edition
- Author: James M. Ward, Anne K. Brown
- Cover artist: Fred Fields
- Language: English
- Series: Heroes of Phlan
- Genre: Fantasy novel
- Published: 1992 (TSR, Inc.)
- Publication place: United States
- Media type: Print (Paperback)
- Pages: 313
- ISBN: 1560763183
- OCLC: 25528136
- Preceded by: Pool of Radiance
- Followed by: Pool of Twilight

Pools of Darkness is a novel based on the Pools of Darkness computer role-playing game. It was written by James Ward and Anne K. Brown, and published by TSR in February 1992. The novel is set in the Forgotten Realms setting based on the Dungeons & Dragons fantasy role-playing game. This book was the second in a trilogy, preceded by Pool of Radiance and followed by Pool of Twilight.

== Plot summary ==
The city of Phlan has vanished, transported to parts unknown, and its citizens defend themselves from the minions of Bane. Adventurers Ren, Shal, and Tarl band together with the sorceress Evaine to stop them.

== Reception ==
One reviewer commented: "The evil wizard antagonist just seems kinda plopped in there for the sake of having a bad guy. He wasn't really threatening or scary, more like a child having a prolonged temper tantrum. The plan of the god he served and the pit fiend that was supposed to serve him seemed kinds tossed in there too, and I'm a little disappointed that the creature from the last book wasn’t there at all."

== Reviews ==
- Kliatt
