= Pool of Twilight =

1993 novel by James M. Ward and Anne K. Brown

- Pool of Twilight first edition cover (Kern battles an osyluth).
- Author: James M. Ward, Anne K. Brown
- Cover artist: Fred Fields
- Language: English
- Series: Heroes of Phlan
- Genre: Fantasy novel
- Published: October 28, 1993 (TSR, Inc.)
- Publication place: United States
- Media type: Print (Paperback)
- Pages: 312
- ISBN: 1-56076-582-8
- OCLC: 29304900
- LC Class: MLC R CP00872
- Preceded by: Pools of Darkness

Pool of Twilight is a fantasy novel published by TSR, Inc. in November 1993. It is the third and final novel in the "Heroes of Phlan" novel trilogy, set in the Forgotten Realms setting for the Dungeons & Dragons role-playing game.

== Plot summary ==
The conclusion of the "Pool" series. Kern, son of Shal and Tarl, and Daile, daughter of Ren, search for the missing Warhammer of Tyr, stolen by the god Bane at the end of the previous novel.

== Reception ==
The book entered the USA Today Top 150 on October 28, 1993, and was on the USA Today Best-Selling Books list for 2 weeks, with #75 as its best week.

== Reviews ==
- Kliatt
