= Jeff Grubb =

American writer and game designer (born 1957)

- Born: August 27, 1957 (age 69); Pittsburgh, Pennsylvania, U.S.
- Occupation: Writer
- Spouse: Kate Novak (m. 1983)

Jeff Grubb (born August 27, 1957) is an American author of novels, short stories, and comics, as well as a computer and role-playing game designer in the fantasy genre. Grubb worked on the Dragonlance campaign setting under Tracy Hickman, and the Forgotten Realms setting with Ed Greenwood. His written works include The Finder's Stone Trilogy, the Spelljammer and Jakandor campaign settings, and contributions to Dragonlance and the computer game Guild Wars Nightfall (2006).

== Personal life ==
Grubb was born in Pittsburgh, Pennsylvania. He met Kate Novak in high school and married her in 1983. His first year of employment involved work with air pollution control devices.

== Beginnings in role-playing games ==
Grubb became a wargaming enthusiast during his high school years. He started to play Avalon Hill wargames including PanzerBlitz and Blitzkrieg, and the SPI game, Frigate. As a freshman, he attended the campus war-gaming club and was introduced to the role-playing game, Dungeons & Dragons. Grubb said,

"I walked up to a group of players to ask what they were doing. One turned to me, handed me three six-siders, and said, 'Roll these. We need a cleric.' It was all downhill from there."

Within the year, Grubb attended Gen Con, a table-top gaming convention, for the first time. He also ran his own campaign set in Toril, his own game universe.

== Career ==
=== TSR ===
Grubb's overseeing of the design of the "AD&D Open" at Gen Con in 1982, led to his employment as a game designer at TSR. He was a design consultant on Gary Gygax's 1983 work, Monster Manual II for the Advanced Dungeons & Dragons role-playing game. Tracy Hickman got Harold Johnson, then Grubb, Carl Smith and Larry Elmore in on the idea of Dragonlance before Margaret Weis and Douglas Niles joined them. In 1984, Grubb was the principal architect of the Marvel Super Heroes game system.

Grubb was a consultant on the first edition of Unearthed Arcana, and authored the first edition of the Manual of the Planes. Grubb contacted Ed Greenwood, author of numerous articles in Dragon about his home campaign setting, and soon Greenwood began sending Grubb packages full of maps of his world and background information for the setting; this collaboration resulted in the publication of the Forgotten Realms campaign setting beginning with the Forgotten Realms Campaign Setting (1987). He is the designer of the Spelljammer campaign setting, and the Al-Qadim setting. Grubb felt that Al-Qadim was well received because the designers were able to hide the potential of the setting from the executives at TSR.

In the late 1980s, Grubb wrote four fill-in issues of the DC Comics licensed Advanced Dungeons & Dragons comic book, and wrote 25 issues of DC Comic's Forgotten Realms series. Grubb started the Buck Rogers line for TSR with a board game published in 1988. Grubb continued to work on role-playing games with TSR for many years, long enough to be regarded affectionately as an "old timer" by Scott Haring. In 1994, he left TSR to pursue freelance work. Grubb wrote three supplements for the Jakandor setting, published in 1997–1998 as the final publications in the Odyssey series.

=== Freelance work ===
When Wizards of the Coast purchased TSR inc., Grubb was engaged to work on games, settings, and source books such as Tempest Feud for the Star Wars Roleplaying Game, d20 Modern and Urban Arcana. He wrote The Memoirs of Auberon of Faerie for R. Talsorian Games and was one of the authors of the D20 Warcraft: The Roleplaying Game for Sword & Sorcery Studios. He has also been involved with Sovereign Press, founded by Margaret Weis and Don Perrin in 2001. He designed the HeroClix Unleashed set.

== Comics, novels, and short stories ==
In 1988, Azure Bonds, Grubb's first novel, which was coauthored with his wife, Kate Novak, was published as part of The Finder's Stone Trilogy. The second and third books in the trilogy, The Wyvern's Spur and Song of the Saurials, were published by TSR inc. in 1990 and 1991. Grubb and Novak continued to write novels in the Forgotten Realms setting, releasing Masquerades, Finder's Bane, and Tymora's Luck. Other settings such as Magic: The Gathering, Warcraft and StarCraft have also featured in his novels. Grubb also wrote the 45th issue of Superman Adventures, "Mateless in Metropolis" (cover date July 2000).

Grubb's short stories are set in a variety of fictional worlds, including Dragonlance, Forgotten Realms, Ravenloft and Thieves' World. In general, his short fiction has been well received, with his story "Malediction" being described as amongst the best of those included in Thieves' World: Enemies of Fortune, while "Beowulf in the City of the Dark Elves" has been regarded as the best of the original fiction in The Further Adventures of Beowulf: Champion of Middle Earth.

Among his favorite novels that he authored are Azure Bonds, Lord Toede, and The Brothers' War, and his favorite short stories include "The Judgement of abd-al-Mammat" and "Lycanthrope Summer."

Grubb is the author of over a dozen novels and 30 short stories.

== Computer games ==
The novel Azure Bonds was developed into a computer game, Curse of the Azure Bonds, in 1989, and was published by Strategic Simulations. ArenaNet hired Grubb to write the story for the third installment of their Guild Wars franchise, Guild Wars Nightfall. Although credited as a designer under lead designer James Phinney, in an interview with GameSpy he describes his role as more of an 'embedded writer' than a designer. Grubb was involved in designing the Guild Wars: Eye of the North expansion pack. He has also done world-building and writing for Blue Byte. He is working as a writer and game designer for Guild Wars 2.

== Bibliography ==
=== Novels ===
==== Dragonlance (shared universe) ====
- Villains
  - Book 5: Lord Toede (1994), ISBN 0-09-945501-3

==== Forgotten Realms (shared universe) ====
- Cormyr: A Novel (with Ed Greenwood, 1996), ISBN 978-0-7869-0503-4
- The Finder's Stone Trilogy (with Kate Novak)
  - Azure Bonds (1988), ISBN 0-88038-612-6
  - The Wyvern's Spur (1990), ISBN 0-88038-902-8
  - Song of the Saurials (1991), ISBN 1-56076-060-5
- The Harpers (with Kate Novak)
  - Book 10: Masquerades (1995), ISBN 0-7869-0152-7
  - Book 15: Finder's Bane (1997), ISBN 0-7869-0658-8
- The Lost Gods (with Kate Novak)
  - Tymora's Luck (1997), sequel to Finder's Bane, ISBN 0-7869-0726-6

==== Magic: The Gathering (shared universe) ====
- Artifacts Series
  - Book 1: The Brothers' War (1998), ISBN 0-7869-6639-4
- Ice Age Trilogy
  - The Gathering Dark (1999)
  - The Eternal Ice (2000)
  - The Shattered Alliance (2000)

==== WarCraft (shared universe) ====
- The Last Guardian (2001), ISBN 0-671-04151-7. This novel has been described as "an original tale of magic, warfare, and heroism based on the bestselling, award-winning electronic game from Blizzard Entertainment".

==== StarCraft (shared universe) ====
- Liberty's Crusade (2001), ISBN 0-671-04148-7

==== Guild Wars (shared universe) ====
- Ghosts of Ascalon (2010), ISBN 978-1-4165-8947-1 – first novel in a three-book series of stand-alone novels set in the world of Tyria, in the 250 years that separates Guild Wars and Guild Wars 2.
  - written with Matt Forbeck

==== Star Wars (shared universe) ====
- Scourge (2012), ISBN 978-0099542667 – An adaptation of Tempest Feud.

=== Comics ===
==== Forgotten Realms DC Comics ====
- DC Comics published 25 Forgotten Realms comics from 1 September 1989 to 25 September 1991 where Jeff Grubb was the author.

=== Role-playing books ===
- Al-Qadim: Arabian Adventures (1992)
- D&D: Diablo II Adventure Game (with Bill Slavicsek, published by Wizards of the Coast)
- d20 Modern Role-playing Game (with Bill Slavicsek, Rich Redman, and Charles Ryan)
- DL7 Dragons of Light
- Eye of the Wyvern (TSR, Inc.) Part of TSR's "Fast-play Game" series for Dungeons & Dragons.
- Karameikos: Kingdom of Adventure (with Aaron Allston and Thomas M. Reid, part of the TSR Audio Games series, TSR, Inc.)
- M2 Maze of the Riddling Minotaur
- Manual of the Planes (1987) Published by TSR, Inc. ISBN 0-88038-399-2
- Tempest Feud (with Owen K.C. Stephens, published by Wizards of the Coast for the Star Wars Roleplaying Game)
- Urban Arcana (with Eric Cagle, David Noonan, & Stan!, published by Wizards of the Coast)

==== Boot Hill ====
- BH4 Burned Bush Wells

==== Marvel Super-Heroes ====
- Marvel Super Heroes Advanced Set
- MARVEL SUPER HEROES game
- Numerous modules

==== Spelljammer ====
- Spelljammer: AD&D Adventures in Space Boxed Set (November 1989), ISBN 0-88038-762-9.
- Legend of Spelljammer Box Set (September 1991), ISBN 1-56076-083-4.

==== High Adventure ====
- Buck Rogers Adventure Game (with Steven Schend)

=== Miniatures games ===
- Star Wars Miniatures: Rebel Storm (with Bill Slavicsek, Jonathon Tweet, & Rob Watkins)
