= Azure Bonds =

1988 novel written by Kate Novak and Jeff Grubb

- Cover of first edition
- Author: Kate Novak & Jeff Grubb
- Cover artist: Clyde Caldwell
- Language: English
- Series: Finders Stone Trilogy
- Genre: Fantasy novel
- Publisher: TSR, Inc.
- Publication date: October 1988
- Publication place: United States
- Media type: Print (Paperback)
- Pages: 380
- ISBN: 0-88038-612-6
- OCLC: 18910805
- LC Class: CPB Box no. 1733 vol. 4
- Followed by: The Wyvern's Spur

Azure Bonds is a 380-page paperback fantasy novel written by Kate Novak and Jeff Grubb, with cover art by Clyde Caldwell, and published by TSR Inc. in 1988. It is the first novel of the Finder’s Stone Trilogy which is set within the world of the Forgotten Realms. It served as the basis for the computer game, Curse of the Azure Bonds. One of the co-authors, Jeff Grubb, stated that of the novels he has written, Azure Bonds is one of his favorites.

== Development ==
In 1984, while Jeff Grubb was managing the Forgotten Realms setting: "I had a concept for a novel that mixed sword-and-sorcery with mystery and personal discovery - the tale of a woman who wakes up one morning with no knowledge of her immediate past and a set of strange tattoos on her arms. I laid out the novel one night to my wife, Kate Novak, while we were driving from Lake Geneva [Wisconsin] to Milwaukee. By the time we got there, I had a co-writer".

== Plot ==
The trilogy's titular "finder's stone" plays a relatively limited role and has an essentially introductory presence in the novel.

The story begins with the main character, an adventurer named Alias, awakening in a disoriented and amnesic state. She soon discovers that she has a newly acquired azure colored tattoo imprinted on the inside of her sword arm in the space between her wrist and elbow. At first she attributes her memory loss to inebriation and the tattoo as a drunken prank by companions. She soon finds that the tattoo is magical in origin, resists attempts to remove it and most worryingly, exerts a power to compel her actions.

Before long, Alias becomes the nucleus of a disparate party of adventurers: a mysterious lizard-creature named Dragonbait, a southern mage called Akabar Bel Akash, and a halfling "bard" named Olive Ruskettle. The novel's plot follows the actions of the party which are combinations of the group's investigations and interruptions caused by the compulsions of the tattoo.

It is later revealed that Alias herself is in fact a complicated, magically created, artificial being intended by her creators to be their proxy in various nefarious purposes. The tattoo was to be a means of control as well as a branding of ownership by each of the collaborating parties involved in her creation. Her long-term memories were actually granted to her by her sole benign (but misled) creator and her short-term memory loss is due in part to the gap between the end of her artificial memories and her premature awakening.

Alias eventually wins the freedom to control her actions and is able to embark on a life of her own. Events towards the end of the novel result in Giogioni Wyvernspur (a recurring supporting character), inadvertently acquiring the finder's stone forming the back-story of the next novel in the trilogy, The Wyvern's Spur.

== Characters ==
The novel marks the initial appearances of an ensemble of enduring characters, the foremost amongst which being Alias and Dragonbait. During the course of the story, several prominent characters of the larger fantasy world of the Forgotten Realms are featured. These include Azoun IV and Vangerdahast, Elminster, Moander, and The Nameless Bard (Finder Wyvernspur).

Alias
A female warrior and the protagonist of the novel. At the onset of the story she is portrayed as an archetypal adventurer, being a seasoned traveler and veteran hired guard. She is depicted on the cover artwork in chainmail with an archetypal "cleavage window", explained away as "ceremonial" armor.

Dragonbait
Dragonbait is the first of the companions encountered by Alias. He has the most unusual appearance of the party and physically resembles a greenish, lizardman-like creature. Incapable of normal speech, his early behavior is often clownish and servile but obedient. It is eventually learned that he is in fact a highly accomplished member of his race that are known as saurials. His name is actually an acquired nickname courtesy of Alias.

Akabar Bel Akash
A native from the southern lands of Turmish — a region of the Forgotten Realms roughly comparable in style and culture to the medieval Middle East. Initially, Akabar is conducting his affairs as a merchant but he also has training as a mage and inwardly yearns to prove himself as an adventurer.

Olive Ruskettle
Olive is a female halfling and the final member of the party to be encountered. She is a self-styled bard but displays the duplicity and skill at thievery and pilfering characteristically associated with halflings; in the course of the book, it is revealed that she has won the identity of a true bard, one Olav Ruskettle, and feminized his given name for her purposes.

== Reception ==
- In Issue #25 of OtherRealms (winner of the 1989 Hugo for Best Fanzine) a reviewer stated that Azure Bonds was written to have a broader appeal to those not familiar with the AD&D game. The reviewer also noted that although it has good characterization, several key scenes felt glossed over, but concluded by giving the book a rating of 3 stars.
- Brett Franklin from Candlekeep.com gave a positive review, praising the characterization and the fixed linear storyline whilst another reviewer from Candlekeep.com stated the ending was not as succinct as he would have liked.
- Reviewer Merric Blackman called the book "an unqualified success... a book that manages to combine a compelling plot with memorable and engaging characters, while not skimping on the world-building". He concluded: "If you want to see how to write good D&D fiction, go no further than Azure Bonds. It’s more than good gaming fiction – it’s damn good storytelling, full stop".
- Reviewer Dan Ruffolo thought the story arc of the book resembled a role-playing adventure, but didn't think that was a bad thing, given the book's audience of role-players. He noted the presence of a strong female hero, unusual for the time, pointing out that "it is an early instance of fantasy that has a strong female protagonist who solves her own problems and don’t take no crap from no one". He concluded that the book was "an excellent story".
- On RPGNet, this book was ranked 391 out of 461 compared to other Gaming Fiction with a rating of 6.51.

In the Io9 series revisiting older Dungeons & Dragons novels, Rob Bricken commented that "Azure Bonds rolls an 8 on its 1d20, making it more than twice as good as The Crystal Shard, but still with a lot of room for improvement".

== Reviews ==
- Review by Steve Jones (1989) in Critical Wave, #12
- Kliatt

== Other media ==
=== Game module ===
A game module Curse of the Azure Bonds has also been released in April 1989 under Forgotten Realms Module FRC2. The module was written by Jeff Grubb and George MacDonald. The adventure module ties in with the Azure Bonds novel. The module follows the main character Alias in the story where the characters awaken with mysterious blue sigils.

=== Computer game ===
In 1989, SSI published a computer game titled Curse of the Azure Bonds. The game's plot follows a similar premise to the novel but is set sometime after the events of the novel instead of being a direct adaptation. The game had a favorable reception achieving a score of 90% from Amiga Magazine Rack. The reviewer Paul Rigby describes it an improvement over its predecessor Pool of Radiance and it has "a good storyline and excellent graphics. CAB is recommended whatever version you have".

== See also ==
- The Wyvern's Spur - 2nd Book in Finders Stone Trilogy
- Song of the Saurials - 3rd Book in Finders Stone Trilogy
