= List of Dungeons & Dragons 4th edition monsters =

The 4th edition of the Dungeons & Dragons tabletop role-playing game (see editions of Dungeons & Dragons) was released in 2008. The first book containing monsters to be published was the Heroic Tier adventure Keep on the Shadowfell, followed closely by the release of the first set of "core" rulebooks.

== WTC 21718 – Keep on the Shadowfell (2008) ==
Keep on the Shadowfell was the first official 4th edition Dungeons & Dragons product released. It is part one of a three part series of adventures. The monsters appear in the 80-page adventure book booklet and are organized as they appear in the adventure encounters.

ISBN 978-0-7869-4850-5

Creature	Page	Other Appearances	Variants	Description
Kobold	16–17,25–28	Monster Manual (2008)	Kobold slinger, kobold minions, kobold dragonshields, kobold skirmisher, kobold wyrmpriest	Small reptilian humanoids
Drake	30,42	Monster Manual (2008)	Guard drake	Small carnivorous reptiles similar in form to the theropod dinosaurs
Human	30	Monster Manual (2008)	Human rabble	
Gnome	31	Monster Manual (2008)	Gnome skulk	Small and slender humanoids
Halfling	31	Monster Manual (2008)	Halfling slinger	Small humanoids
Rat	38,54	Monster Manual (2008)	Rat swarm, giant rats	Example of a monster posing little threat to the characters in the game, suitable for play at lowest level.
Goblin	38–40,42,44	Monster Manual (2008)	Goblin sharpshooters, goblin warriors, goblin cutters	Small green humanoids
Hobgoblin	40,64,66–68,69	Monster Manual (2008)	Hobgoblin torturer, hobgoblin soldiers, hobgoblin grunts, hobgoblin archer, hobgoblin warcaster, hobgoblin warchief	Normal size humanoids covered in coarse fur. Muscular humanoids somewhat taller than humans with reddish skin and canine teeth. Mordenkainen Presents: Monsters of the Multiverse gave them a new background as a species originating in and expelled from the Feywild, while also presenting hobgoblins societies with different characteristics on different worlds, but all centered around forming close-knit groups.
Zombies	46,48,60,71,74	Monster Manual (2008)	Zombies, zombie rotters, gravehound zombies, corruption corpses	Undead decomposed corpses
Skeleton	50,60,79	Monster Manual (2008)	Skeleton warriors, decrepit skeletons	Undead decomposed corpses to the bone. Reviewer Jamie Thomson found the skeleton warriors "beings similar to Tolkien's ringwraiths".
Ochre Jelly	54	Monster Manual (2008)		Resembles a giant amoeba
Kruthik	56–57	Monster Manual (2008)	Kruthik hatchlings, kruthik young, kruthik adult	Four-legged reptilians with natural plate armor covering most of their body
Blue Slime	59			
Spider	65	Monster Manual (2008)	Deathjump spider	
Gelatinous Cube	70	Monster Manual (2008)		
Ghoul	74	Monster Manual (2008)		Undead decomposed corpses. Undead with "terrible claws". AD&D's ghouls were also adapted into the Magic: The Gathering trading card game, with a depiction taken from the Monster Manual being used in a prototype version.
Homunculus	75	Monster Manual (2008)	Clay scout	Clay scouts are small flying gargoyle-like creatures made from clay
Vampire Spawn	76	Monster Manual (2008)		Pale undead humanoids with fangs
Dark One	77	Monster Manual (2008)	Dark creeper	Small humanoids from the Shadowfell plane
Deathlock Wight	79	Monster Manual (2008)		Varies but generally an undead corrupted corpse resembling his living form

== WTC 21720 – Monster Manual (2008) ==
This is the first monster book for the Dungeons & Dragons 4th edition, published in 2008. This book features an alphabetical listing of monsters on page 3, an introduction on pages 4–7, the monster descriptions on pages 8–275, instructions for converting some monsters into NPCs and PCs on pages 276–279, a glossary on pages 280–283, and a list of the monsters in the book ranked by level on pages 284–287.

ISBN 978-0-7869-4852-9

Creature	Page	Other Appearances	Variants	Description
Aboleth	8–9		Aboleth lasher, aboleth slime mage, aboleth overseer	Large eel-like aberrations with potent psionic abilities. SyFy Wire contributor Lisa Granshaw included them in her 2018 list of "The 9 Scariest, Most Unforgettable Monsters From Dungeons & Dragons" due to their impressive abilities and vengefulness.
Aboleth Servitor	9			Human aberrations with translucent and slimy skin
Astral Stalker	10			Humanoid abomination with large claws and skull-like face
Atropal	10–11			Floating humanoid abomination resembling a Ghoul. Tyler Linn of Cracked.com identified the atropal as one of "15 Idiotic Dungeons and Dragons Monsters" in 2009, describing it as "a stillborn god-fetus risen from the dead to confuse everyone at the end of 2001: A Space Odyssey." He comments: "Despite possessing godlike powers and being metal as fuck, the Atropal at its core is still just a dead fetus. Here's a general rule for undead creatures: If the thing wasn't any kind of threat when it was alive, it's probably not going to be any more of a problem in its slower, decomposing form." Screen Rant compiled a list of the game's "10 Most Powerful (And 10 Weakest) Monsters, Ranked" in 2018, calling this one of the strongest, saying "An atropal might not be the most powerful creature on this list but it is easily the most fearsome to look at." The atropal appeared on the 2018 Screen Rant top list at #20 on " Dungeons & Dragons: The 20 Most Powerful Creatures, Ranked", and Scott Baird highlighted that "You may think that you can protect yourself from the negative energy aura with magic, but the atropal can cast greater dispelling at will."
Blood Fiend	11–12			Four-arm humanoid abomination with large claws
Phane	12–13			Half-cat half-humanoid abomination with a misty consistence
Tarrasque	12–13			Huge tyrannosaurus-like abomination with horns. Ranked among the strongest monsters in the game by Scott Baird from Screen Rant, "the ultimate challenge for many players". Rob Bricken from io9 named the tarrasque as the 10th most memorable D&D monster. The tarrasque appeared on the 2018 Screen Rant top list at No. 5 on " Dungeons & Dragons: The 20 Most Powerful Creatures, Ranked", and Scott Baird highlighted that "The tarrasque is currently the most powerful creature in the 5th edition of Dungeons & Dragons, where it is matched only by Tiamat in terms of its combat prowess."
Angel	14–17		Angel of battle, angel of protection, angel of valor, angel of valor cohort,angel of valor veteran, angel of valor legionnaire, angel of vengeance	Varies but generally humanoid forms with wings
Archon	18–21		Fire archon emberguard, fire archon blazesteel, fire archon ash disciple, ice archon hailscourge, ice archon rimehammer, ice archon frostshaper	Varies but generally humanoid forms made up from an element
Azer	22–23		Azer warrior, azer foot soldier, azer rager, azer taskmaster, azer beastlord	Resembles a dwarf with brass-colored skin, and hair and beard of flames
Balhannoth	24			Large worm-like aberration with tentacles
Banshrae	25		Banshrae dartswarmer, banshrae warrior	Humanoids with insect-like features
Basilisk	26		Venom-eye basilisk, stone-eye basilisk	Large six (sometimes eight)-legged lizard. Based on the creature from medieval bestiaries. In the original Monster Manual it is described as a reptilian monster whose gaze can turn creatures to stone. AD&D's basilisk was also adapted into the Magic: The Gathering trading card game, with a depiction taken from the Monster Manual being used in a prototype version.
Bat	27		Shadowhunter bat, fire bat	Large bat-like creatures
Battlebriar	28		Warthorn battlebriar, earthrage battlebriar	Plant creatures resembling large frogs with claws and large teeth
Bear	29		Cave bear, dire bear	
Beetle	30		Fire beetle, tangler beetle, rot scarab swarm	
Behemoth	31		Macetail behemoth, bloodspike behemoth	Bloodspike behemoth resembles a large reptile similar in form to the Stegosaurus stenops and macetail behemoth resembles a large reptile similar in form to the Euoplocephalus tutus
Beholder	32–33		Beholder eye of flame, beholder eye tyrant	Resembles a floating orb of flesh with a large mouth, single central eye, and lots of smaller eyestalks on top with deadly magical powers. A "creature that looks at you and is destroying you by the power of its magical eyes". A terrible beast, but depicted as "a cuddly rosy ball with too many eyes". Designed to counter magic-using characters while being a formidable opponent for a whole party due to its versatility. Considered one of "the game's signature monsters" by Philip J. Clements. A "classic", "iconic", as well as "one of the most feared and fearsome monsters of the game", present through all editions.
Berbalang	34			Medium-sized blue demon-like humanoid with bat wings
Boar	35		Dire boar, thunderfury boar	
Bodak	36		Bodak skulk, bodak reaver	Humanoids with smooth grayish-black skin and a featureless face
Boneclaw	37			Resembles humanoids who are half skeletal and half without skin with three-fingered huge claws
Bulette	38		Bulette, dire bulette	Large armored mole-like creature. Also called land shark, inspired by a plastic toy from Hong Kong. In his 2019 book The Monsters Know What They're Doing, author Keith Ammann called bulettes "brutes tailor-made to give your players jump scares" and found its preferences and aversions for the meat of different humanoid races "ludicrous".
Cambion	39		Cambion hellsword, cambion hellfire magus	Archetype devil appearance
Carrion Crawler	40		Carrion crawler, enormous carrion crawler	Large yellow and green worm-like aberration
Chimera	41			Appears to be an amalgam of a goat, lion and a dragon with three heads. The chimera is based on the chimera of Greek mythology as found in the Iliad by Homer, "stronger than a centaur but weaker than a sphinx". Present in the game since the earliest edition.
Choker	42		Cavern choker, feygrove choker	Resembles small greyish-black humanoids
Chuul	43		Chuul juggernaut	Large pale yellow lobster-like aberrations
Colossus	44		Godforged colossus	Large animated statues
Crocodile	45		Visejaw crocodile, feymire crocodile	
Cyclops	46–48		Cyclops guard, cyclops warrior, cyclops impaler, cyclops rambler, cyclops hewer, cyclops battleweaver, cyclops storm shaman	Single eyed giants
Dark One	49	Keep on the Shadowfell (2008)	Dark creeper, dark stalker	Small humanoids from the Shadowfell plane
Death Knight	50–51		Death knight (human fighter),death knight (dragonborn paladin)	A "powerful undead warrior", Shannon Applecline considered this creature created by Charles Stross one of the game's especially notable monsters.
Demon	52–58		Balor, barlgura, evistro (carnage demon), glabrezu, goristro, hezrou, immolith, marilith, mezzodemon, vrock	Varies. Many were based on figures from Christian demonology. Considered among the "standard repertoire of "Monsters"" by Fabian Perlini-Pfister. In a review of Planescape Monstrous Compendium Appendix II for Arcane magazine, the reviewer cites the culture of the tanar'ri as helping "give the Planes a solid base of peoples". Featuring a highly-muscled man-like body and bat wings, the balor is based on and renamed from the Balrog from J.R.R. Tolkien's legendarium.
Destrachan	59		Destrachan, destrachan far voice	Large reptiles similar in form to the theropod dinosaurs
Devil	60–67		Bearded devil (barbazu), bone devil (osyluth), chain devil (kyton),ice devil (gelugon), imp, legion devil grunt, legion devil hellguard, legion devil veteran, legion devil legionnaire,pit fiend, spined devil (spinagon),succubus, war devil (malebranche)	Varies. Many were based on figures from Christian demonology. Imps are minor fiends which could be created from larvae.
Devourer	68–69		Spirit devourer, viscera devourer, soulspike devourer	Undead humanoids of varied forms but generally with exposed ribcage. A giant skeleton that is holding a small figure prisoner in their ribcage, this creature is highlighted by reviewer Kaneda for characters to steer away from.
Displacer Beast	70		Displacer beast, displacer beast packlord	Resembles six-legged black puma with a pair of black tentacles sprouting from its shoulders. Based on the alien Coeurl from the short story Black Destroyer by A. E. van Vogt. David M. Ewalt, in his book Of Dice and Men, discussed several monsters appearing in the original Monster Manual, describing displacer beasts as looking like "pumas with thorn-covered tentacles growing out of their shoulders". Rob Bricken from io9 named the displacer beast as the 2nd most memorable D&D monster.
Doppelganger	71		Doppelganger sneak, doppelganger assassin	Humanoids able to change shape
Dracolich	72–73		Dracolich, blackfire dracolich, runescribed dracolich	Resembles undead dragon skeleton. Ranked among the strongest monsters in the game by Scott Baird from Screen Rant. It was also one of the first new creatures introduced for the Forgotten Realms campaign setting.
Dragon	74–85		Young black dragon, adult black dragon, elder black dragon, ancient black dragon, young blue dragon, adult blue dragon, elder blue dragon, ancient blue dragon, young green dragon, adult green dragon, elder green dragon, ancient green dragon, young red dragon, adult red dragon, elder red dragon, ancient red dragon, young white dragon, adult white dragon, elder white dragon, ancient white dragon	Resembles a reptile-like winged creature with magical or unusual abilities. Powerful and intelligent, usually winged reptiles with magical abilities and breath weapon. The different subraces, distinguished by their colouring, vary in power. The dragon has been referred to as the "iconic creature for D&D adventurers to conquer".
Dragonborn	86–87		Dragonborn soldier, dragonborn gladiator, dragonborn raider, dragonborn champion	Normal size humanoids with dragon features. Within the setting of Dungeons & Dragons 4th Edition, they frequently appear as mercenaries, and make excellent sorcerers, warlords, paladins, and fighters. The dragonborn were introduced to the core rules of Dungeons & Dragons 4th Edition in an attempt to reflect contemporary trends in fantasy fiction and appeal to newer players. In addition, it reflected a perception among the game's designers that it should be possible to play dragon-like creatures in a game with "Dragons" in the title. Richard Baker, who helped design 4th Edition, noted that the introduction of dragonborn to the core rules allowed them to "grow the D&D world by allowing the mix of characters to evolve in the new edition."
Dragonspawn	88–89		Redspawn firebelcher, blackspawn gloomweb, bluespawn godslayer	Varies but spawned from corrupted dragon eggs
Drake	90–92	Keep on the Shadowfell (2008)	Spiretop drake, guard drake, needlefang drake swarm, pseudodragon, spitting drake, rage drake	Varies. The pseudodragon is "a miniature dragon that also has a tail stinger" Reviewer Philippe Tessier found it "very nice" and interesting when made available as a familiar.
Drider	93		Drider fanglord, drider shadowspinner	Drows which have been transformed from the waist down so they have the lower body of a spider
Drow	94–95		Drow warrior, drow arachnomancer, drow blademaster, drow priest	Dark elves. Made famous R. A. Salvatore's Drizzt novels, these dark elves from the game influenced subsequent works of fantasy. Drow have a gender-based caste system that says "a great deal about attitudes towards gender roles in the real world". Bleeding Cool reviewer Gavin Sheehan considered "the schism between drow and other elves" one "of the most contentious relationships in the multiverse" of D&D. A drider is a "monster that looks like a centaur only with the bottom half of a spider instead of a horse."
Dryad	96		Dryad, briar witch dryad	Resembles humanoids with tree-like features. Based on the dryad from classical sources. The dryad appears as a player character class in Tall Tales of the Wee Folk in the "DM's booklet" (1989).
Dwarf	97		Dwarf bolter, dwarf hammerer	Small size humanoids. Based on Tolkien's version of the dwarf. Often depicted as "short, stout, and fond of ale", "bearded masters of metalworking" and "predisposed towards a "good" moral alignment", "tend to embody an extreme vision of masculinity".
Efreet	98–100		Efreet fireblade, efreet cinderlord, efreet flamestrider, efreet pyresinger, efreet karadjin	Giants with reddish skin and horns and body part flesh and flame. A depiction of an "evil [...] efreet" already appeared in the original Dungeons & Dragons (1974) edition, another "enormous, devilish red" one was the main feature of the cover of the 1st edition Dungeon Master's Guide. Within the game's cosmology they were based on the Plane of Fire, centered around the "fabled City of Brass".
Eidolon	101		Eidolon	Resembles a large human-like creature of stone covered in runes
Eladrin	102–103		Eladrin fey knight, eladrin twilight incanter, bralani of autumn winds, ghaele of winter	High elves
Elemental	104–105		Firelasher, rockfire dreadnought, earthwind ravager, thunderblast cyclone	Varies but composed of one of the four classical elementals of air, earth, fire, or water. Powerful creatures in the game; a characteristic of the air elemental is the ability of rapid movement.
Elf	106		Elf archer, elf scout	Slender humanoids with pointed ears. Based on Tolkien's version of the elf, "quick but fragile", with senses surpassing a human's, often depicted as "effeminate" and "predisposed towards a "good" moral alignment".
Ettercap	107		Ettercap fang guard, ettercap webspinner	
Ettin	108		Ettin marauder, ettin spirit-talker	Two-headed giants
Flameskull	109		Flameskull, great flameskull	Floating skull on flames
Fomorian	110–111		Fomorian warrior, fomorian painbringer	Deformed giants
Foulspawn	112–113		Foulspawn grue, foulspawn mangler, foulspawn berserker, foulspawn seer, foulspawn hulk	Corrupted humanoids
Galeb Duhr	114		Galeb duhr earthbreaker, galeb duhr rockcaller	Boulder-like creature
Gargoyle	115		Gargoyle, nabassu gargoyle	Resembles grotesque stone statues. AD&D's gargoyle was adapted into the Magic: The Gathering trading card game, with a depiction taken from the Monster Manual being used in a prototype version.
Ghost	116–117		Phantom warrior, trap haunt, wailing ghost (banshee), tormenting ghost	Varies. Inspired by Gothic fiction, a typical denizen of the Ravenloft setting.
Ghoul	118–119	Keep on the Shadowfell (2008)	Ghoul, horde ghoul, abyssal ghoul, abyssal ghoul hungerer, abyssal ghoul myrmidon	Undead decomposed corpses
Giant	120–125		Death giant, death titan, hill giant, earth titan, fire giant, fire giant forgecaller, fire titan, storm giant, storm titan	Large to huge humanoids. Overlarge powerful humanoids with a self-involved social focus, usually presented as the "bad guys". Based on mythological figures and Tolkien, their stone-throwing ability indicates their creative roots in wargaming.
Gibbering Beast	126–127		Gibbering mouther, gibbering abomination, gibbering orb	amorphous aberrations covered with eyes and mouths. A creature with many eyes and mouths. Witwer et al. found Erol Otus' early depiction "perversely beautiful", the artist's surrealist style very suited for this bizarre monster.
Githyanki	128–129		Githyanki warrior, githyanki mindslicer, githyanki gish	Tall and gaunt humanoids with almost skeletal features. Xenophobic humanoids with gaunt stature, leathery yellow skin and fangs. Inhabitants of the Astral Plane, and ancient enemies of the githzerai, githyanki are considered to "boast some excellent twists" as non-player characters, but "little more than dextrous, not to mention ugly, egg layers" as PCs by reviewer Trenton Webb Introduced by Charles Stross in White Dwarf No. 12, and officially included in the game in Fiend Folio (1981) and featured on its cover. The name was borrowed the name from a fictional race in George R. R. Martin's Dying of the Light. The githyanki/illithid relationship was inspired by Larry Niven's World of Ptavvs. The githyanki were voted among the top ten best monsters from that White Dwarf's "Fiend Factory" column. Shannon Applecline considered the githyanki one of the game's especially notable monsters. Scott Baird of the website TheGamer commented on the nature of the relationship of the githyanki to the mind flayers, to whom they were formerly enslaved: "Despite their wicked reputation, the Githyanki have an important role to play in protecting the Prime Material Plane. The Githyanki despise Mind Flayers and their armies might be the only thing holding them back. The trailer for Baldur's Gate 3 shows just how scary a single Mind Flayer ship can be, and that could happen a thousand times over if the Githyanki aren't around." ComicBook.com contributor Christian Hoffer considered "the conflict between the otherworldly githzerai and githyanki" one "of the great conflicts that make up the D&D multiverse", and praised the expanded lore presented in Mordenkainen's Tome of Foes as "certainly useful as both inspiration and as research material for building a D&D campaign."
Githzerai	130–131		Githzerai cenobite, githzerai zerth, githzerai mindmage	Tall and gaunt humanoids with almost skeletal features. Designed by Charles Stross, these humanoids are the ancient and fervent enemies of mind flayers, to whom they were formerly enslaved, and the githyanki; they are based on the plane of Limbo. A playable species in the Planescape campaign setting, reviewer Johnny L. Wilson found them a new take on the niche usually occupied by elves. Shannon Applecline considered the githzerai one of the game's especially notable monsters, while ComicBook.com contributor Christian Hoffer counted "the conflict between the otherworldly githzerai and githyanki" among "the great conflicts that make up the D&D multiverse", and praised the expanded lore presented in Mordenkainen's Tome of Foes as "certainly useful as both inspiration and as research material for building a D&D campaign."
Gnoll	132–133		Gnoll huntmaster, gnoll claw fighter, gnoll marauder, gnoll demonic scourge	Hyenas-like humanoids. Richard W. Forest assumed them to be inspired from but not resembling the gnoles conceived by Lord Dunsany, while Gary Gygax himself stated that although Dunsany's "gnole" is close", he came up with the name as "a cross between a gnome and a troll", and the description was his original creation. He wanted to create a humanoid opponent in the game to fit in between the hobgoblin and bugbear in power. Gnolls were considered one of the "five main "humanoid" races" in AD&D by Paul Karczag and Lawrence Schick.
Gnome	134	Keep on the Shadowfell (2008)	Gnome skulk, gnome arcanist	Small and slender humanoids. Player character race "often stereotyped as buffoons, illusionists, mad inventors, and many characters play them as intentionally "wacky" or anachronistic"; often conforms to the trickster archetype. "predisposed towards a "good" moral alignment".
Bugbear	135–141		Bugbear warrior, bugbear strangler	Stocky hairy humanoids. The bugbear is a hairy cousin of the goblin, for the most part presented as inherently evil before the 5th edition of the game,
Goblin	135–141	Keep on the Shadowfell (2008)	Goblin cutters, goblin blackblade, goblin warriors, goblin sharpshooters, goblin hexer, goblin skullcleaver, goblin underboss	Small green humanoids. Based primarily on the goblins portrayed in J.R.R. Tolkien's Middle-Earth. Considered one of the "five main "humanoid" races" in AD&D by Paul Karczag and Lawrence Schick. Presented as "evil" and "predisposed towards a society of brutal regimes where the strongest rule" in the game. Suitable opponent for characters of lowest level.
Hobgoblin	135–141	Keep on the Shadowfell (2008)	Hobgoblin grunts, hobgoblin warrior, hobgoblin archer, hobgoblin soldiers, hobgoblin warcaster, hobgoblin commander, hobgoblin hand of bane	Normal size humanoids covered in coarse fur
Golem	142		Flesh golem, stone golem	Varies. The clay golem is based on the golem of Medieval Jewish folklore, while the flesh golem is related to Frankenstein's monster as Universal's 1931 film, seen in e.g. being empowered by electricity. The flesh golem was ranked ninth among the ten best mid-level monsters by the authors of Dungeons & Dragons For Dummies. All golems are inspired by Gothic fiction more generally; a typical denizen of the Ravenloft setting, and "classic" monster of the game. The influence of Dungeons & Dragons has led to the inclusion of golems in other tabletop role-playing as well as in video games.
Gorgon	143		Iron gorgon, storm gorgon	Magical beasts resembling a bull. "iron plated bull", based on early modern bestiaries, with only the name being derived from the Classical counterpart.
Grell	144		Grell, grell philosopher	Aberration resembling a floating brain with a frontal beak and ten tentacles originating on its underside. "terrifying beaked, tentacled monsters that populate the realm of Underdark". Tyler Linn of Cracked.com listed the grell among the "15 Most Idiotic Monsters In Dungeons & Dragons History" and found that it's movement by floating contributed to it looking ridiculous.
Grick	145		Grick, grick alpha	Large snake-like aberrations with beak and four barbed tentacles originating at the base of the beak
Griffon	146–147		Hippogriff, hippogriff dreadmount, griffon, rimefire griffon	Creatures with the forequarters, wings and head of an eagle, hindquarters of various forms depending on type of griffon. Originally based on the creature from Persian mythology the adapted hippogriff "was among the earliest fantasy beasts introduced into the Dungeons & Dragons universe": An artistic representation drawing inspiration from real eagles and horses was used for the cover of the third booklet of the original Dungeons & Dragons (1974) edition and became one of "the game's earliest ambassadors" through use of that cover in advertisements. Gary Gygax used a story in which he received a letter asking how many eggs a Hippogriff could lay as an example of the encyclopedic knowledge which fans expected him to have over every detail of gameplay.
Grimlock	148		Grimlock minion, grimlock follower, grimlock ambusher, grimlock berserker	Gray skinned humanoids without eyes or eye sockets
Guardian	149		Shield guardian, battle guardian	Constructs of various materials and humanoid form
Hag	150–151		Howling hag, bog hag, night hag, death hag	Resemble wretched old women. Based on the pervasive figure from folklore, with "different interpretations of the monster around the world" being worked into different variants in the game, allowing each "a little more personality". In the view of Stag and Trammel, hags in D&D represent misogynistic and ageist tendencies in their authors. SyFy Wire in 2018 called it one of "The 9 Scariest, Most Unforgettable Monsters From Dungeons & Dragons", saying that "There are endless horrific possibilities when it comes to hags." The night hag is a powerful hag from Hades, propagating evil by creating larvae. Don Turnbull referred to the night hag as "splendid" and notes that the illustration of the night hag is the best drawing in the book. It has been described as comparable to the Alp of folklore, although "considered a more Judeo-Christian demonic influence".
Halfling	152–153	Keep on the Shadowfell (2008)	Halfling slinger, halfling stout, halfling thief, halfling prowler	Small humanoids. Based on and renamed from the hobbit in J.R.R. Tolkien's works. The hobbit first appeared as a player character class in the original 1974 edition of Dungeons & Dragons. Later the game began using the name "halfling" as an alternative to "hobbit" for legal reasons. The "halfling" appeared as a player character race in the original Player's Handbook (1978).
Harpy	154		Harpy, bloodfire harpy	Humanoid creatures with avian wings and talons for feet and hands. Based on the creature from Greek mythology. Witwer et al. viewed its artistic rendering in 5th edition as "redesigned from prior editions to entice more Dungeon Master use."
Helmed Horror	155		Helmed horror, greater helmed horror	Resembles an animated suit of armor
Homunculus	156–157		Clay scout, iron defender, iron cobra	Varies
Hook Horror	158		Hook horror	Bipedal subterranean monster that looks like a vulture-like humanoid with bony hooks in place of hands. The hook horror was first published in White Dwarf #12 (April–May 1979), and was originally submitted by Ian Livingstone. It was voted among the top ten monsters from the magazine's "Fiend Factory" column and reprinted in Best of White Dwarf Articles (1980). Ed Greenwood, in his review of the Fiend Folio for Dragon magazine, considered the hook horror as one of the creatures with "strange appearances and little else; there is no depth to their listings" and that it was one of the creatures which "seem incomplete".
Horse	159		Riding horse, warhorse, celestial charger	
Hound	160–161		Hell hound, shadow hound, wild hunt hound	Varies.
Human	162–163	Keep on the Shadowfell (2008)	Human rabble, human lackey, human bandit, human guard, human berserker, human mage	
Hydra	164–165		Fen hydra, mordant hydra, primordial hydra	Large snake-like creatures with multiple heads. Based on the creature from classical sources, with Heracles' famed method of slaying it adapted into a vulnerability against fire, but not with the less well-known poisonous bite, showing how the game mostly focusses on the well-known traits of mythological creatures. Present in the game since its inception. AD&D's hydra was also adapted into the Magic: The Gathering trading card game, with a depiction taken from the Monster Manual being used in a prototype version.
Hyena	166		Hyena, cacklefiend hyena	
Kobold	167–169	Keep on the Shadowfell (2008)	Kobold minions, kobold skirmisher, kobold slinger, kobold dragonshields, kobold wyrmpriest, kobold slyblade	Small reptilian humanoids. "[S]hort subterranean lizard-men", considered one of the "five main "humanoid" races" in AD&D by Paul Karczag and Lawrence Schick, and ranked among the weakest monsters in the game by Scott Baird from Screen Rant.
Kruthik	170–171	Keep on the Shadowfell (2008)	Kruthik hatchlings, kruthik young, kruthik adult, kruthik hive lord	Four-legged reptilians with natural plate armor covering most of their body
Kuo-toa	172–173		Kuo-toa guard, kuo-toa marauder, kuo-toa harpooner, kuo-toa monitor, kuo-toa whip	Fish-like humanoids.
Lamia	174		Lamia	Varies
Larva Mage	175		Larva mage	A mass of worms and maggots taking the form of a mage
Lich	176–177		Lich (human wizard), lich (eladrin wizard)	Undead spellcasters. Emaciated undead spellcaster, a "classic" monster of the game.
Lich Vestige	176–177			Animated remains of a former lich
Lizardfolk	178–179		Greenscale hunter, greenscale darter, greenscale marsh mystic, blackscale bruiser	Reptilian humanoids. A player character race in some settings. Reviewer Chris Gigoux described them by saying "Lizard Men aren't bad, [...] they're just a simple folks, struggling to survive." In 2020, Comic Book Resources counted the lizardfolk as # 1 on the list of "10 Powerful Monster Species That You Should Play As", stating that "Along with the ability to manufacture their own weapons from the natural environment around them, they provide an excellent role-playing experience and have some pretty awesome tricks up their sleeve." An image of a lizard man by Greg Bell functioned as the logo in the early phase of TSR Hobbies, while "the bloodied bodies of lizard men" overcome by a group of adventurers featured on the cover of the 1st edition Player's Handbook, considered "arguably the most iconic piece of art in all of RPGdom" by Reactor magazine commentator Saladin Ahmed.
Lycanthrope	180–181		Wererat, werewolf	Shapechanger humanoids. Afflicted shapechangers, whose condition could be transmitted like a disease; some available as player character races. Depiction of the werewolf is related to those in 1930s and 1940s Hollywood movies like The Wolf Man. Ranked sixth among the ten best low-level monsters by the authors of Dungeons & Dragons For Dummies: "a classic monster", interesting due to shapechanging because "players can never be entirely sure whether that surly villager might indeed be the great black wolf who attacked their characters out in the forest." The presence of lyncanthropes in the gaming system is one of the elements that has led Christian fundamentalists to condemn Dungeons & Dragons and to associate it with the occult. Screen Rant has described the operation of lycanthropy in the game as an aspect that "makes no sense" because it is often a positive development for a character. "It is possible for a character to be infected with lycanthropy in Dungeons & Dragons and it comes highly recommended, as the benefits outweigh the negatives". It notes that "[i]n exchange for learning how to control your condition, you gain Damage Reduction, +2 to your Wisdom stat, the Scent ability, Low-Light Vision, a new Hit Dice, the Iron Will feat, and the ability to transform into a more powerful form". An illustration in one edition of the Monster Manual implied that the beast in Disney's Beauty and the Beast was a lycanthrope, with a creature having a resemblance to the Beast attacking a human resembling that film's antagonist, Gaston. Present in the game since its inception, an image of a werewolf's face by Gygax' childhood friend Tom Keogh was "[a]lmost certainly the oldest piece of art" in the original D&D.
Magma Beasts	182–183		Magma claw, magma hurler, magma strider, magma brute	Varies
Manticore	184		Manticore	Based on its mythological counterpart, including the barbed tail, the manticore appeared in the game from its earliest edition. Large magical beasts with the body of a lion, dragon wings, and a somewhat humanoid head
Marut	185		Marut blademaster, marut concordant	Astral humanoids
Medusa	186–187		Medusa archer (female), medusa warrior (male), medusa shroud of zehir (female)	Scaly skinned humanoids with powerful gaze. Based on the creature from classical sources but translated into species of monsters originated from "humans seeking eternal youth". Reviewer Allan Rausch found their portrayal as "a woman with snakes for hair" up to 2nd edition less compelling than their less human-like depiction in 3rd edition. Part of the game from its very beginning, a medusa was already depicted in the playtest material from 1973 for the original edition.
Mind Flayer	188–189		Mind flayer infiltrator, mind flayer mastermind	Humanoid aberrations with psionic powers and octopus-like heads. "Squid-headed humanoids", considered one of "the game's signature monsters" by Philip J. Clements. Reviewer Julien Blondel described them as vile brain-eating creatures full of psionic energy. He found them delightful creatures for a sadistic Dungeon Master to use, and a useful bridge between classic game worlds and the planes, as illithids abound in both.
Minotaur	190–191		Minotaur warrior, minotaur cabalist, savage minotaur	Bull-like Humanoids. Based on the creature from Greek mythology, but translated from a singular creature into a species. In 2021, Comic Book Resources counted the minotaur as one of the "7 Underused Monster Races in Dungeons & Dragons", stating that "far from just brutal monsters. Many are lawful by nature, which means, surprisingly, Minotaurs make for some good Paladins. They also, obviously, make for some good Barbarians, Monks and Fighters. There's a lot of potential with Minotaurs. People hate and fear them, but you might be able to play that to your advantage...or fight against the stereotypes." The minotaur was among the monsters featured as trading cards on the back of Amurol Products candy figure boxes. AD&D's minotaurs were also adapted into the Magic: The Gathering trading card game, with a depiction taken from the Monster Manual being used in a prototype version.
Mummy	192–193		Mummy guardian, mummy lord (human cleric), giant mummy	Based on the creature from Gothic fiction and appearances in more contemporary entertainment, a typical denizen of the Ravenloft setting. In his review of the Monster Manual in the British magazine White Dwarf #8 (August/September 1978), Don Turnbull noted that the mummy was revised from its previous statistics, and could now cause paralysis on sight (as a result of fear).
Naga	194–195		Guardian naga, bone naga, dark naga, primordial naga	Varies but snake-like creatures. Snake-like magical creatures with humanoid head. Based on the nāga from Indian mythology.
Nightmare	196		Nightmare	Resembles black horse with flaming hair
Nightwalker	197		Nightwalker	Humanoid being formed of shadow
Ogre	198–199		Ogre thug, ogre bludgeoneer, ogre savaga, ogre skirmisher, ogre warhulk	Brutish and dull-witted humanoids. Large, powerful humanoid creatures, with slightly below average intelligence. Typical bad guys in the game, who can be used to teach "players about fighting big, powerful, stupid monsters, which is an iconic D&D experience".
Oni	200–201		Oni night haunt, oni mage	Ogre-like humanoids with horns
Ooze	202	Keep on the Shadowfell (2008)	Ochre jelly, gelatinous cube	Amorphous creatures that dwell in dungeons. "D&D's large variety of monstrous oozes and slimes took their original inspiration from Irvin S. Yeathworth Jr's The Blob" movie. In the artificial dungeon environment of the game, they function as a "clean up crew". The gelatinous cube, "a living mound of gelatinous jelly", was considered especially suited for that role, as it fit exactly in the standard grid for tactical combat. Considered an "iconic monster". Ian Livingstone considered the ochre jelly one of the game's more "exotic and strange creatures". SyFy Wire contributor Lisa Granshaw counted oozes among "The 9 Scariest, Most Unforgettable Monsters From Dungeons & Dragons" and found them "extremely disturbing because everything may seem fine one minute and then the next you're on the way to death." D&D's slimes have served as inspiration for appearances of this kind of monster in many video games.
Orc	203–205		Orc drudge, orc warrior, orc raider, orc berserker, orc eye of Gruumsh, orc bloodrager, orc chieftain	Savage humanoids that revel in combat. Directly adapted from the orc in J.R.R. Tolkien's works. Considered one of the "five main "humanoid" races" in AD&D by Paul Karczag and Lawrence Schick. Presented as "evil" and "savage raiders" in the game.
Orcus	206–210		Orcus, aspect of Orcus, Doresain, the Ghoul King, deathpriest hierophant, deathpriest of Orcus, crimson acolyte	Orcus, Demon Prince of the Undead, and the members of his cult. Inspired by its real-world mythological counterpart.
Otyugh	211		Otyugh	Creature that lives in piles of waste. Also known as gulguthra. Game designer Don Turnbull rated the otyugh as a "most interesting creation".
Owlbear	212		Owlbear, winterclaw owlbear	A creature with the front half of an owl and the back half of a bear. Newly created for the game early on inspired by a Hong Kong–made plastic toy, the owlbear was well-received as a useful and memorable monster.
Panther	213		Fey panther, spectral panther	
Purple Worm	214		Purple worm, elder purple worm	Enormous armored "worms" that burrow through the ground. The "dread purple worm" attacks with both ends, maw and stinger. This "iconic monster" and original creation of Dungeons & Dragons is present all editions of the game.
Quickling	215		quickling runner, quickling zephyr	Fey creatures that can move incredibly fast. Small, intelligent, chaotic and speedy, it appeared on Geek.com's list of "The most underrated monsters of Advanced Dungeons & Dragons".
Rakshasa	216–218		Rakshasa warrior, rakshasa archer, rakshasa assassin, rakshasa noble, rakshasa dread knight	Feline humanoids that can alter their appearance. Based on the creature from Hindu mythology. Humanoid fiends with tigerlike-features, Reactor magazine commentator Saladin Ahmed rated them as "ultimate badass monsters". He found a depiction sitting with pipe and smoking-jacket fitting on second thought, as the creature is so powerful it has no need to prove its dangerousness.
Rat	219	Keep on the Shadowfell (2008)	Giant rat, dire rat, rat swarm	
Roc	220–221		Roc, phoenix, thunderhawk	Enormous birds of prey. Phoenixes and thunderhawks have ties to the Elemental Chaos. An enormous bird, based on a mythological creature probably of Persian origin, known from Sindbad the Sailor.
Roper	222		Roper	A creature that roughly resembles a stalagmite when at rest. A dangerous inhabitant of the Underdark with "murderous behavior". One of the original creations for the game, Witwer et al. rated them among the "iconic D&D monsters".
Rot Harbinger	223		Rot harbinger, rot slinger	Undead creatures that spread rot with their claws.
Sahuagin	224–225		Sahuagin guard, sahuagin raider, sahuagin priest, sahuagin baron	Shark-like humanoids that live in the sea.
Salamander	226–227		Salamander lancer, salamander firetail, salamander archer, salamander noble	Evil creatures associated with the element of fire.
Satyr	228		Satyr rake, satyr piper	Goat-like humanoids of fey origin. Based on the satyr from classical sources.
Scorpion	229		Stormclaw scorpion, hellstinger scorpion	
Shadar-Kai	230–231		Shadar-kai chainfighter, shadar-kai gloomblade, shadar-kai witch, shadar-kai warrior	Humanoids of darkness and shadow.
Shambling mound	232		Shambling mound, stormrage shambler	Animated mass of vines and foliage. Ben Woodard considered its ability to move "the base creepiness of the creep".
Shifter	233		Longtooth shifter, razorclaw shifter	Offspring of humans and lycanthropes
Skeleton	234–235	Keep on the Shadowfell (2008)	Decrepit skeleton, skeleton, blazing skeleton, boneshard skeleton, skeletal tomb guardian	Reanimated bones that serve their creator. The skeleton was ranked second among the ten best low-level monsters by the authors of Dungeons & Dragons For Dummies: "introduces players to the special advantages and weaknesses of undead monsters". They also thank Ray Harryhausen for people knowing what fighting skeletons ought to look like. Screen Rant ranked the tiny skeleton one of the weakest D&D creatures, saying "[skeletons] go all the way down to Tiny-sized creatures, which means that it is possible for your party of adventurers to fight a group of skeletons that are the same size as action figures."
Skull Lord	236		Skull lord	Three-headed skeletal creature that commands lesser undead.
Slaad	237–239		Slaad tadpole, grey slaad (rift slaad), red slaad (blood slaad), blue slaad (talon slaad), green slaad (curse slaad), black slaad (void slaad)	Frog-like beings of pure chaos. Ed Greenwood considered the slaadi "worthy additions to any campaign". GameSpy author Allan Rausch described the slaadi as "remorseless reptilian killing machines", but "For many years, slaad were a joke -- because of their artwork", which showed them as "six-foot tall carnivorous frogs". With the Planescape setting they "were reinterpreted artistically to be less frog-like and much more fearsome". Shannon Applecline considered the githzerai one of the game's especially notable monsters.
Snake	240–241		Deathrattle viper, crushgrip constrictor, flame snake, shadow snake	
Sorrowsworn	242–243		Sorrowsworn soulripper, sorrowsworn reaper, sorrowsworn deathlord, shadowraven swarm	Gaunt humanoids drawn to places of conflict.
Specter	244		Specter, voidsoul specter	Twisted undead creatures driven to madness. Inspired by Gothic fiction, a typical denizen of the Ravenloft setting.
Sphinx	245		Sphinx	Winged lion-like creature tasked with guarding a specific location. Based on Egyptian and Classical mythology, an example of the diverse cultures amalgamated into D&D.
Spider	246–247	Keep on the Shadowfell (2008)	Deathjump spider, bloodweb spider swarm, blade spider, demonweb terror	
Stirge	248		Stirge, dire stirge, stirge swarm	Bat-like creatures that feed on blood. "[P]esky" because while small they are dangerous to characters as a swarm. Present in the game since its earliest edition.
Swordwing	249		Swordwing, crownwing	Insect-like humanoids that collect a specific type of item.
Tiefling	250		Tiefling heretic, tiefling darkblade	Humans that made a pact with infernal creatures. Descendants of a union between a human and a demon or devil; popular as player characters, as they allow for "identity tourism" of a racial outsider. Johnny L. Wilson called tieflings "the paranoid, loner obverse" of halflings, who "believe that life is out to get them". In the game they are "suited to be great thieves" and "point persons" due to favourable saving throw bonuses.
Treant	251		Treant, blackroot treant	Animated tree with roughly humanoid features. Blackroot treants are undead creatures that appear wilted and dying. Based on the Ent by J. R. R. Tolkien, and renamed due to copyright reasons.
Troglodyte	252–253		Troglodyte warrior, troglodyte mauler, troglodyte impaler, troglodyte curse chanter	Reptilian humanoids that leave beneath the earth. Based on the stock character of the primitive caveman, Gary Gygax portrayed the troglodyte in the game as more monstrous, with chaotic and evil behaviour, offensive smell and lizard-like characteristics. The troglodyte was among the monsters featured as trading cards on the back of Amurol Products candy figure boxes.
Troll	254–255		Troll, war troll, fell troll	Ugly, brutish humanoids that will eat anything that moves. A characteristic denizen of AD&D worlds. Their appearance and powerful regenerative ability is taken from Three Hearts and Three Lions by Poul Anderson rather than from their mythological or Tolkienesque counterparts. Considered one of the "five main "humanoid" races" in AD&D by Paul Karczag and Lawrence Schick.
Umber Hulk	256		Umber hulk, shadow hulk	Insect-like creatures that burrow through the earth. Present in the game since the earliest edition.
Unicorn	257		Unicorn, dusk unicorn	Fey creatures that resemble horses, but with a single horn on their head. Based on the creature from medieval bestiaries. The Dungeons & Dragons animated series featured Uni the unicorn as a well-received "mascot" and "cute animal sidekick".
Vampire	258–259	Keep on the Shadowfell (2008)	Vampire lord (human rogue), vampire spawn fleshripper, vampire spawn bloodhunter	Humanoid undead that feed on the blood of others. Depiction is related to those in 1930s and 1940s Hollywood Dracula movies, as well as folklore and Gothic fiction; a typical denizen of the Ravenloft setting, and "classic" monster of the game.
Vine Horror	260		Vine horror, vine horror spellfiend	Roughly humanoid plant creatures formed of vines.
Warforged	261		Warforged soldier, warforged captain	Magic constructs that possess sentience.
Wight	262–263	Keep on the Shadowfell (2008)	Deathlock wight, wight, battle wight, battle wight commander, slaughter wight	Undead creature that feeds on the life force of others. Thin humanoid undead. Directly adapted from the barrow-wight in Tolkien's The Lord of the Rings, while the concept is inspired Icelandic sagas. Rob Bricken of io9 identified the wight as one of "The 12 Most Obnoxious Dungeons & Dragons Monsters".
Wolf	264		Gray wolf, dire wolf	
Worg	265		Worg, guulvorg	Evil, intelligent creatures related to wolves. Worgs are giant wolves inspired by the wargs in the works of J.R.R. Tolkien; the name was changed for legal reasons, while both word an concept ultimately go back to Old Norse idea of varg, which can refer to wolves in their violent aspect.
Wraith	266–267		Wraith, mad wraith, sword wraith, dread wraith	Undead creatures that feed on souls and spawn more wraiths from their victims. Inspired by and renamed from the Nazgul from J.R.R. Tolkien's legendarium, as well as by Gothic fiction, a typical denizen of the Ravenloft setting.
Wyvern	268		Wyvern, fell wyvern	Bipedal, dragon-like creature with a poisonous tail stinger.
Yuan-Ti	269–273		Yuan-ti malison sharp-eye, yuan-ti malison incanter, yuan-ti malison disciple of Zehir, yuan-ti abomination, yuan-ti anathema, snaketongue initiate, snaketongue zealot, snaketongue warrior, snaketongue assassin, snaketongue celebrant	Evil, snake-like humanoids that live in jungles. Snaketongues are cultists who believe the yuan-ti are emissaries of the god Zehir. A species of "cult-like snake people" and among "D&D's most popular and iconic monsters". The original yuan-ti castes were the abominations, the halfbreeds, and the purebloods, which first appeared in the module Dwellers of the Forbidden City (1981), In the adventure, the characters are hired to find an object taken to a lost oriental-style city, which has been taken over by a cult of snake-worshipers, the yuan-ti, and their servants, the mongrelmen and tasloi. The types have been summarized by A.V. Club as "a human-eating snake, or human-snake hybrid eater of humans and snakes, or other human-snake hybrids." Snakes and snake-worship used in fiction have been criticized as characteristic of Orientalism. The publication history, digital and print, of yuan-ti falls into this pattern as they serve as uncomplicated antagonists in "exotic" settings. Graeme Barber, a game designer noted for his critique of racism in Dungeons & Dragons, used yuan-ti in his contribution to the book Candlekeep Mysteries. Controversy arose after Wizards of the Coast, according to Barber, altered his depiction of yuan-ti. Summarizing his critique of the simplistic portrayal, Barber wrote, "Yuan-ti are evil because evil." Keith Ammann, in his 2019 book The Monsters Know What They're Doing, commented of the yuan-ti purebloods that "Yuan-ti have had hundreds of generations to live and adapt on their own, so they'll have the same self-preservation instinct as any evolved species." TheGamer.com in April 2021 listed the yuan-ti pureblood as #2 on their list of "10 Most Underrated Races That Are Better Than You Think". CBR.com listed the yuan-ti pure blood as #5 on their list of "Top 10 Playable Species In D&D".
Zombie	274–275	Keep on the Shadowfell (2008)	Zombie rotter, zombie, gravehound, corruption corpse, rotwing zombie, chillborn zombie, zombie hulk	Undead creatures animated from the corpses of the deceased. Based on the zombie from folklore as well as more contemporary entertainment.

== WTC 21828 – Forgotten Realms Campaign Guide (2008) ==
Released in August 2008, this book details the Forgotten Realms campaign setting. It includes unique creatures, such as the zairtail, as well as a number of servants of the various groups and cults across the Realms. The table below is organized by the order the creatures first appear.

ISBN 978-0-7869-4924-3

Creature	Page	Other Appearances	Variants	Description
Goblin	8–9, 22, 25–26	Keep on the Shadowfell (2008), Monster Manual (2008)	Goblin cutter, goblin warrior, goblin hexer, goblin skullcleaver, goblin blackblade	Small green humanoids
Starved Dog	23		Starved dog	
Zombie	24	Keep on the Shadowfell (2008), Monster Manual (2008)	Zombie rotter, zombie	Undead creatures animated from the corpses of the deceased
Hobgoblin	26–27	Keep on the Shadowfell (2008), Monster Manual (2008)	Hobgoblin archer, hobgoblin soldier	Normal size humanoids covered in coarse fur
Elf	30	Monster Manual (2008)	Elf archer	Slender humanoids with pointed ears
Human	31, 34	Monster Manual (2008)	Human gang member, human bandit, bandit leader	
Lizardfolk	34	Monster Manual (2008)	Greenscale marsh mystic	Reptilian humanoids
Naga	239		Banelar naga	
Church of Shar	241		Dark moon monk	
Kir-Lanan	241		Kir-lanan wing	
Felljaw	243		Felljaw	
Haraevor	243–244		Haraevor	
Mordrin	244		Mordrin	
Tentacled Torment	245		Tentacled torment	
Dracolich	247		Fettered dracolich	
Draegloth	249–250		Draegloth, draegloth favored one	
Direhelm	252–253		Direhelm	
Doomsept	253		Doomsept	
Jordaini Enforcer	256		Jordaini enforcer	
Gibberling	257		Gibberling bunch, plaguechanged gibberling bunch	Screen Rant reviewer Scott Baird ranked them among the weakest monsters in the game, which have a scary description, but lack the stats to back up this impression.
Malaugrym	258			Aberrant, shapechanging, magical humanoid
Shade	260		Shade	For reviewer Philippe Tessier a monster in the spirit of Fiend Folio.
Thaalud	262		Thaalud	
Veserab	263		Veserab	
Order of Blue Fire	264–266		Knight accordant, loremaster accordant, commander accordant	
Sharn	264		Sharn	
Ghoul	267		Plaguechanged ghoul	
Lycanthrope	270–271		Wereserpent	
Scathebeast	272–273		Scathebeast calf, scathebeast adult, scathebeast watcher, scathebeast bull, scathebeast giant	
Dread Warrior	274		Dread warrior	
Warlock Knights of Vaasa	276–278		Warlock executor, warlock knight vindicator, warlock knight luminary	
Shardsoul	278–279		Shardsoul slayer, shardsoul avatar	
Zairtail	280–281		Zairtail swarm, zairtail firetongue, zairtail gazer, zairtail bonebreaker, zairtail cutter	
Zhent Mercenary	283		Zhent soldier, Zhent Black Sun adept, Zhent war mage	

== WTC 21783 – Adventurer's Vault (2008) ==
This book, published in September 2008, details various weapons, armor, vehicles, mounts, and other magical items. All of the monsters found in this book are mounts and/or creatures summoned through the use of magic items. The table below is organized by the order the creatures first appear.

ISBN 978-0-7869-4978-6

Creature	Page	Other Appearances	Variants	Description
Camel	11			
Elephant	12, 182		Elephant, marble elephant	
Giant Ant	12			Larger versions of mundane ants.
Giant Lizard	12		Giant draft lizard, giant riding lizard	Larger versions of mundane lizards
Horse	13, 182		Sea horse, skeletal horse, obsidian steed, pearl sea horse	
Rhinoceros	13			
Shark	13		Dire shark, riding shark	
Behemoth	13, 182		Trihorn behemoth, jade macetail behemoth	The trihorn behemoth is probably modeled after the triceratops. The jade macetail behemoth is a gem-like version of an ankylosaurus.
Bloodstone Spider	181			
Ebony Fly	181			
Golden Lion	181			
Ivory Goat of Travail	181			
Onyx Dog	182			

== 239667200 – Monster Manual 2 (2009) ==
ISBN 978-0-7869-5101-7

== 253840000 – Monster Manual 3 (2010) ==
ISBN 978-0-7869-5490-2

== 253840000 – Dark Sun Creature Catalog (2010) ==
ISBN 978-0-7869-5494-0

== 244650000 – Monster Vault (2010) ==
A boxed set that includes a book with a revised and streamlined core listing of monsters for the Dungeons & Dragons 4th edition game, published in 2010 as part of the Essentials line. The book features an introduction on pages 4–11, the monster descriptions on pages 12–295, an appendix of animals on pages 296–304, a glossary on pages 305–312, and a list of the monsters in the book ranked by level on pages 313–319.

ISBN 978-0-7869-5631-9

Creature	Page	Other Appearances	Variants	Description
Angel	12–15	Monster Manual (2008)	Angel of protection, angel of battle, angel of valor veteran, angel of vengeance	Varies but generally humanoid forms with wings
Archon	16–19	Monster Manual (2008)	Earth archon, fire archon, ice archon, water archon	Varies but generally humanoid forms made up from an element
Basilisk	20–23	Monster Manual (2008)	Mesmeric-eye basilisk, venom-eye basilisk, wilt-eye basilisk, basilisk, abyssal basilisk	Large six (sometimes eight)-legged lizard
Beholder	24–27	Monster Manual (2008)	Beholder gauth, beholder, beholder eye tyrant	Resembles a floating orb of flesh with a large mouth, single central eye, and lots of smaller eyestalks on top with deadly magical powers
Bulette	28–31	Monster Manual (2008)	Young bulette, bulette, dire bulette	Large armored mole-like creature
Carrion Crawler	32–35	Monster Manual (2008)	Carrion crawler scuttler, carrion crawler, carrion crawler putrefier, enormous carrion crawler	Large yellow and green worm-like aberration
Cyclops	36–39	Monster Manual (2008)	Cyclops crusher, cyclops guard, cyclops rambler, cyclops hewer	Single eyed giants. One-eyed giants based on Greek mythology. Ranked tenth among the ten best mid-level 4th Edition monsters by the authors of Dungeons & Dragons 4th Edition For Dummies.
Death Knight	40–43	Monster Manual (2008)	Death knight, death knight blackguard	
Demon	44–49	Monster Manual (2008)	Dretch lackey, babau, vrock, abyssal eviscerator, hezrou, marilith, balor	Varies
Devil	50–55	Monster Manual (2008)	Imp, succubus, chain devil (kyton), legion devil hellguard, legion devil veteran, ice devil (gelugon), pit fiend	Varies
Displacer Beast	56–59	Monster Manual (2008)	Displacer beast, savage displacer beast, displacer beast pack lord	Resembles six-legged black puma with a pair of black tentacles sprouting from its shoulders
Doppelganger	60–63	Monster Manual (2008)	Doppelganger sneak, doppelganger infiltrator, doppelganger master assassin	Humanoids able to change shape
Dragon	64–79	Monster Manual (2008)	Fledgling white dragon, young white dragon, young black dragon, young green dragon, young blue dragon, young red dragon, deathbringer dracolich, elder white dragon, elder black dragon, elder green dragon, elder blue dragon, elder red dragon, dracolich doomlord	Resembles a reptile-like winged creatures with magical or unusual abilities
Dragonborn	80–81	Monster Manual (2008)	Dragonborn mercenary, dragonborn soldier	Normal size humanoids with dragon features
Drake	82–85	Keep on the Shadowfell (2008), Monster Manual (2008)	Guard drake, spitting drake, pseudodragon, bloodseeker drake, rage drake, ambush drake	Varies
Drider	86–89	Monster Manual (2008)	Drider, drider shadowspinner, drider fanglord	Drows which have been transformed from the waist down so they have the lower body of a spider
Dryad	90–93	Monster Manual (2008)	Dryad recluse, dryad hunter, dryad witch, bough dryad	Resembles humanoids with tree-like features
Duergar	94–99		Duergar scout, duergar guard, duergar thug, duergar raid leader, duergar infernal consort, devil-bred duergar, duergar underlord	Dwarves corrupted by devil patrons. "the infamous dark dwarves", an "evil and avaricious" dwarven subrace with psionic powers. ComicBook.com contributor Christian Hoffer considered the struggle of the duergar with their dwarven cousins one "of the great conflicts that make up the D&D multiverse". Backstab reviewer Michaël Croitoriu found the duergar interesting as a player character option.
Dwarf	100–101	Monster Manual (2008)	Dwarf warrior, dwarf clan guard	Small size humanoids
Efreet	102–105	Monster Manual (2008)	Efreet fireblade, efreet cinderlord, efreet flamestrider	Giants with reddish skin and horns and body part flesh and flame
Elemental	106–109		Lesser air elemental, lesser earth elemental, lesser fire elemental, lesser water elemental	Varies but composed of one of the four classical elementals of air, earth, fire, or water
Elf	110–117	Monster Manual (2008)	Elf archer, elf scout, elf hunter, elf noble guard, eladrin bow mage, eladrin fey knight, eladrin twilight incanter, eladrin battle dancer, drow stalker, drow venomblade, drow arachnomancer	Slender humanoids with pointed ears
Ettin	118–121	Monster Manual (2008)	Ettin thug, ettin wrath chanter, ettin hunter, ettin marauder	Two-headed giants
Gargoyle	122–125	Monster Manual (2008)	Gargoyle rake, gargoyle, gargoyle rock hunter, nabassu gargoyle, rocktempest gargoyle	Resemble grotesque stone statues
Ghoul	126–129	Keep on the Shadowfell (2008), Monster Manual (2008)	Ghoul, ravenous ghoul, abyssal ghoul, abyssal ghoul devourer, abyssal ghoul hungerer	Undead decomposed corpses that hunger for flesh
Giant	130–137	Monster Manual (2008)	Hill giant, hill giant hunter, hill giant earth shaman, earth titan, frost giant, frost giant marauder, frost titan, fire giant flamecrusher, fire giant, fire giant forgecaller, fire titan	Large to huge humanoids
Githyanki	138–141	Monster Manual (2008)	Githyanki warrior, githyanki mindslicer, githyanki raider, githyanki legionary	Tall and gaunt humanoids with almost skeletal features
Gnoll	142–147	Monster Manual (2008)	Gnoll huntmaster, deathpledged gnoll, gnoll blood caller, fang of Yeenoghu, gnoll gorger, demon-eye gnoll, gnoll far fang, gnoll pack lord, gnoll demon spawn	Hyena-like humanoids
Gnome	148–151	Keep on the Shadowfell (2008), Monster Manual (2008)	Gnome spy, gnome illusionist, gnome assassin, gnome entropist	Small and slender humanoids
Goblin	152–159	Keep on the Shadowfell (2008), Monster Manual (2008)	Goblin sniper, goblin beast rider, goblin cutthroat, goblin hex hurler, hobgoblin beast master, hobgoblin battle guard, hobgoblin spear soldier, hobgoblin warmonger, hobgoblin commander, bugbear thug, bugbear backstabber	Varies
Golem	160–163	Monster Manual (2008)	Flesh golem, stone golem, iron golem	Varies
Hag	164–167	Monster Manual (2008)	Bog hag, green hag, night hag	Resemble wretched old women
Halfling	168–169	Keep on the Shadowfell (2008), Monster Manual (2008)	Halfling thief, halfling trickster	Small humanoids
Human	170–173	Keep on the Shadowfell (2008), Monster Manual (2008)	Human goon, common bandit, town guard, human thug, human transmuter, human duelist	
Hydra	174–177	Monster Manual (2008)	Hydra, flamekiss hydra, venom-maw hydra	Large snake-like creatures with multiple heads
Kobold	178–181	Keep on the Shadowfell (2008), Monster Manual (2008)	Kobold tunneler, kobold slinger, kobold quickblade, kobold dragonshield	Small reptilian humanoids
Lich	182–185	Monster Manual (2008)	Lich necromancer, lich remnant, lich soulreaver	Undead spellcasters
Lizardfolk	186–191	Monster Manual (2008)	Poisonscale needler, poisonscale brawler, greenscale raider (level 3 soldier), greenscale trapper, greenscale raider (level 4 skirmisher), greenscale bog mystic, blackscale crusher	Reptilian humanoids
Lycanthrope	192–195	Monster Manual (2008)	Scurrying wererat, frenzied werewolf	Shapechanger humanoids
Manticore	196–199	Monster Manual (2008)	Manticore striker, manticore impaler, manticore spike hurler, manticore sky hunter	Large magical beasts with the body of a lion, dragon wings, and a somewhat humanoid head
Medusa	200–203	Monster Manual (2008)	Medusa bodyguard (male), medusa venom arrow (female), medusa spirit charmer (female)	Scaly skinned humanoids with powerful gaze
Mind Flayer	204–207	Monster Manual (2008)	Mind flayer thrall master, mind flayer unseen, concordant mind flayer	Humanoid aberrations with psionic powers and octopus-like heads
Minotaur	208–211	Monster Manual (2008)	Minotaur soldier, minotaur charger, minotaur magus, demonic savage minotaur	Bull-like humanoids
Mummy	212–215	Monster Manual (2008)	Shambling mummy, moldering mummy, mummy tomb guardian, royal mummy	
Ogre	216–219	Monster Manual (2008)	Ogre, ogre hunter, ogre mercenary, ogre juggernaut, arena-trained ogre	Brutish and dull-witted humanoids
Ooze	220–223	Keep on the Shadowfell (2008), Monster Manual (2008)	Ochre jelly, green slime, gelatinous cube, black pudding, black pudding spawn	Amorphous creatures that dwell in dungeons
Orc	224–229	Monster Manual (2008)	Battletested orc, orc savage, orc archer, orc reaver, orc rampager, orc pummeler, orc storm shaman	Savage humanoids that revel in combat
Otyugh	230–233	Monster Manual (2008)	Otyugh, charnel otyugh, neo-otyugh	Tentacled creatures that live in piles of waste
Owlbear	234–237	Monster Manual (2008)	Young owlbear, owlbear, trained owlbear, wind-claw owlbear, winterclaw owlbear	A creature with the front half of an owl and the back half of a bear
Purple Worm	238–241	Monster Manual (2008)	Adult purple worm, purple worm tunneler	Enormous armored "worms" that burrow through the ground
Rakshasa	242–245	Monster Manual (2008)	Rakshasa warrior, rakshasa archer, rakshasa mage	Feline humanoids that can alter their appearance
Roper	246–249	Monster Manual (2008)	Impaling roper, cave roper, crag roper	A creature that roughly resembles a stalagmite when at rest.
Rust Monster	250–253		Rust monster, gluttonous rust monster, young rust monster swarm	An original invention for the game and its artificial underground world, the appearance of the rust monster was inspired by a plastic toy from Hong Kong. It was ranked among the most memorable as well as obnoxious creatures in the game, terrifying to certain characters and their players not due to their ability to fight but to destroy their items. Chris Sims of the on-line magazine Comics Alliance referred to the rust monster as "the most feared D&D monster".
Skeleton	254–257	Keep on the Shadowfell (2008), Monster Manual (2008)	Decrepit skeleton, blazing skeleton, skeletal legionary, skeletal tomb guardian	Reanimated bones that serve their creator.
Stirge	258–261	Monster Manual (2008)	Stirge, stirge suckerling, death husk stirge, dire stirge, stirge suckerling swarm	Bat-like creatures that feed on blood.
Tiefling	262–263	Monster Manual (2008)	Tiefling fury, tiefling occultist	Humans that made a pact with infernal creatures.
Treant	264–267	Monster Manual (2008)	Bramblewood treant, treant, treant grove guardian, blackroot treant	Animated tree with roughly humanoid features. Blackroot treants are undead creatures that appear wilted and dying.
Troglodyte	268–271	Monster Manual (2008)	Troglodyte mauler, troglodyte grunt, troglodyte thrasher, troglodyte impaler	Reptilian humanoids that leave beneath the earth.
Troll	272–275	Monster Manual (2008)	Troll, battle troll, bladerager troll, ghost troll render	Ugly, brutish humanoids that will eat anything that moves.
Umber Hulk	276–279	Monster Manual (2008)	Umber hulk, umber hulk tunneler, umber hulk bewilderer, deep hulk	Insect-like creatures that burrow through the earth.
Vampire	280–283	Keep on the Shadowfell (2008), Monster Manual (2008)	Elder vampire spawn, vampire night witch, master vampire	Humanoid undead that feed on the blood of others.
Wraith	284–287	Monster Manual (2008)	Wraith, mad wraith, wraith figment, sovereign wraith	Undead creatures that feed on souls and spawn more wraiths from their victims.
Yuan-Ti	288–291	Monster Manual (2008)	Yuan-ti malison stalker, yuan-ti malison sharp-eye, yuan-ti abomination, yuan-ti malison chanter	Evil, snake-like humanoids that live in jungles. Snaketongues are cultists who believe the yuan-ti are emissaries of the god Zehir.
Zombie	292–295	Keep on the Shadowfell (2008), Monster Manual (2008)	Grasping zombie, hulking zombie, flesh-crazed zombie, zombie shambler	Undead creatures animated from the corpses of the deceased.
Bear	296	Monster Manual (2008)	Bear, dire bear	
Crocodile	297	Monster Manual (2008)	Crocodile	
Horse	297	Monster Manual (2008)	Horse	
Hyena	298	Monster Manual (2008)	War hyena	
Rat	298–299	Keep on the Shadowfell (2008), Monster Manual (2008)	Dire rat, scurrying rat swarm	
Shark	299	Adventurer's Vault (2008)	Shark	
Snake	300–301	Monster Manual (2008)	Spitting cobra, deathrattle viper, crushgrip constrictor, snake swarm	
Spider	301–303	Keep on the Shadowfell (2008), Monster Manual (2008)	Spider swarm, deathjump spider, doomspinner spider, cave spider	
Wolf	304	Monster Manual (2008)	Gray wolf, dire wolf	

== 283640000 – Monster Vault: Threats to the Nentir Vale (2011) ==
A sourcebook for monsters and NPCs from the Nentir Vale setting for the Dungeons & Dragons 4th edition game, published in 2011 as part of the Essentials line. The book features an introduction (including details on the Nentir Vale) on pages 4–13, the monster descriptions on pages 14–121, a glossary on pages 122–125, and a list of the monsters in the book ranked by level on pages 126–127.

ISBN 978-0-7869-5838-2

Creature	Page	Other Appearances	Variants	Description
Abyssal Plague Demons	14–16		Plague Demon Chaos Hound, Plague Demon Chaos Footsoldier, Plague Demon Chaos Beast, Plague Demon Chaos Bender, Plague Demon Chaos Knight, Plague Demon Chaos Vanguard	Demons from a dead universe
Barrowhaunts	17–19		Uthelyn the Mad, Lingering Warrior Spirit, Lingering Monster Spirit, Adrian "Iceheart" Reginold, Joplin the Sly, Boldos Grimehammer, Cassian d'Cherevan	Fallen undead adventurers
Bitterstrike	20–23		Entry includes Treant Vassal, Satyr Vassal, Tigerclaw Vassal, Frost Witch Vassal, Wild Coldscale Drake	The White Wyrm of Winterbole
Blackfang Gnolls	24–26		Blackfang Feaster, Maldrick Scarmaker, Blackfang Gravedigger, Blackfang Howler, Blackfang Render; entry includes Blackfang Hyena Pack	A fearsome band of gnolls
Bloodfire Ooze	27			Oozes created from blood and demon ichor
Boggle	28–29	Secret of the Slavers Stockade (1981), Monster Manual II (1983), Monstrous Compendium Annual Volume Two (1995), Monster Manual II (2002)	Boggle Sight Stealer, Boggle Blink Trickster, Boggle Chase Trickster, Boggle Body Snatcher	Malicious fey tricksters
Cadaver Collector	30–31	Monster Manual III (2004)	Entry includes Gokof, Hobgoblin Necromancer	Constructs that collect corpses. Bleeding Cool called the cadaver collector "nightmare fuel".
Calastryx	32–33		Entry includes Emberdark Kobold Pillager	Three-headed red dragon
Clan Bloodspear	34–37	Field Folio (1981; Ogrillon only), Greyhawk Ruins (1990; Ogrillon only), Monstrous Manual (1993; Ogrillon only), Dungeon #83 (2000; Ogrillon only), Fiend Folio (2003; Half-troll only)	Bloodspear Grenadier, Queen Msuga, Rohka the Blood Witch, Bloodspear Krull, Bloodspear Ogrillon, Bloodspear Shiv, Bloodspear Half-Troll, Bloodspear Savage Throng	Hateful orc clan
Daggerburg Goblins	38–41		Daggerburg Ruffian, Mistmane Bugbear, Warlord Delderosh, Daggerburg Theurge, Daggerburg War Mage, Daggerburg Zealot, Daggerburg Slayer, Daggerburg Captain, Kabo Bomble, Daggerburg Reaper; entry includes Battle Worg	Plundering goblins
Dark Drake of the Moon Hills	42–43		Dark Drake of the Moon Hills, Hellghost Dark Drake, Adderbrood Dark Drake	Malicious drakes
Dythan's Legion	44–47		Legatus Dythan, Dythan's Legion Vanguard, Dythan's Legion Warrior, Dythan's Legion Archer, Dythan's Legion Dragoon; entry includes Arkhosian Siege Tower, Liondrake	Dragonborn legionnaires
Fell Court	48–51		Fell Court Blackheart, Melech Ambrose, Fell Court Ruffian, Fell Court Underboss, Fell Court Creep, Fell Court Hellmage	Tiefling outcasts
Felldrake	52–53	Monster Manual II (2002)	Leaping Felldrake, Crested Felldrake, Hissing Felldrake, Tri-Horned Felldrake	Drakes altered by tieflings
Frost Witches	54–56		Frost Witch, Frost Witch Harpy, Clenderi; entry includes Icicle Swarm, Frozen Cauldron Guardian	Servants of Cryonax
Gravelstoke Family	57–59		Vincent Gravelstoke, Tovin Gravelstoke, Mikus Gravelstoke, Xander Gravelstoke, Alesia Gravelstoke	Family of assassins
Gray Company	60–62		Halvath Cormarrin, Gray Company Mist Mage, Gray Company Fallen Hero, Gray Company Recruit, Gray Company Soldier	Grim soldiers seeking to restore Nerath's greatness
Harken's Heart	63–65		Harken's Heart Acolyte, Harken's Heart Druid, Harken's Heart Defender, Harken's Heart Hierophant	Ruthless druids
Hound of Ill Omen	66–67	Fiend Folio (1981), Monstrous Compendium Annual Volume Three (1996)	Hound of Ill Omen, Bregga; entry includes Hill Clan Apparition	Ghostly hounds
Hunter Spiders	68–70		Ti'irtha, Drow Spider Totemist, Drow Razorscourge, Drow Darklasher	Drow exiled to the surface world
Hurly-Burly Brothers	71			Rival troll brothers
Iron Circle	72–75		Iron Circle Dark Adept, Iron Circle Commander, Iron Circle Brigand, Iron Circle Spy; entry includes Tar Devil Harrier, Tar Devil Brawler, Tar Devil Guard	Mysterious mercenaries
Mages of Saruun	76–78		Mage of Saruun, Saruun Apprentice, Saruun Underdark Adept, Warped Mage of Saruun; entry includes Bronze Warder, Saruun Bat	Wizards obsessed with the Underdark
Mooncalf	79–81	Monster Manual II (2002)	Mooncalf Harvester, Mooncalf, Mooncalf Sire, Mooncalf Rogue	Predators from the Far Realm
Penanggalan	82–83	Fiend Folio (1981), Monstrous Compendium – Fiend Folio Appendix (1992), Oriental Adventures (2001)	Penanggalan, Penanggalan Head Swarm, Penanggalan Bodiless Head	Flying undead head with entrails
Peryton	84–85	Monster Manual (1977), Monstrous Compendium – Forgotten Realms Appendix II (1991), Monstrous Manual (1993), Monstrous Compendium: Monsters of Faerûn (2001), Hoard of the Dragon Queen (2014)	Peryton, Elder Peryton	Birds with the heads of stags
Phantom Brigade	86–88		Phantom Brigade Knight-Commander, Phantom Brigade Squire, Phantom Brigade Armiger, Phantom Brigade Justiciar, Phantom Brigade Banneret, Phantom Brigade Templar	Ghostly knights of Nerath
Ragewind	89	Monstrous Compendium – Planescape Appendix II (1995; as Sword Spirit), Monster Manual II (2002)		Undead entities created from the wrath of fallen warriors
Raven Roost Bandits	90–93		Erzoun, Raven Roost Harrier, Samminel, Raven Roost Grenadier, Geriesh, Raven Roost Cutthroat, Raven Roost Outlaw Veteran, Raven Roost Sharpshooter, Raven Roost Highwayman	Bandits of Raven Roost Manor
River Rats	94–96		Kelson, Lower Quays Guttersnipe, Razorclaw Jack, Lowtown Urchin, Lowtown Kneebreaker, Market Green Grifter	Street thugs
Scroll Mummy	97			Construct created from discarded magic items
Shadowmire	98–99			Master of evil in the Witchlight Fens
Tigerclaw Barbarians	100–103		Scargash, Tigerclaw Hordeling, Tigerclaw Brave, Tigerclaw Scout, Tigerclaw Fang-Wielder, Tigerclaw Shaman; entry includes Sabertooth Tiger, Primal Sabertooth Tiger	Shifter raiders
Treants of the Nentir Vale	104–107		Winterbole Frostbeard, Winterbole Sapling, Winterbole Rimeneedle, Wood Woad Juggernaut, Mysteriphal, Wood Woad Druid	Treants of the Winterbole and Harken Forests
Twig Blight	108–109	The Sunless Citadel (2000), Monster Manual II (2002), Dungeons & Dragons Starter Set (2014)	Twig Blight Seedling, Twig Blight Swampvine, Twig Blight, Twig Blight Swarm	Small plants that feed on blood
Vampiric Mist	110–111	Monster Manual II (1983; Crimson death only), Monstrous Compendium – Forgotten Realms Appendix (1989; Crimson death only), Monstrous Compendium – Greyhawk Appendix (1990; Vampiric mist only), Monstrous Manual (1993), Monster Manual II (2002; Crimson death only)	Vampiric Mist, Vampiric Mist Corruptor, Crimson Deathmist, Chillborn Vampiric Mist	Bloodthirsty mist
Vestapalk	112–113		Entry includes Tiktag	Green dragon of destiny
Wandering Tower	114–116		Entry includes Mirror Mimic, Blood Raven Swarm, Living Walls	Huge mimic. The living wall appeared on Geek.com's list of "The most underrated monsters of Advanced Dungeons & Dragons".
Witchlight Lizardfolk	117–119		Lizardfolk Mire Scout, Lizardfolk Bog Walker, Lizardfolk Fen Spy, Lizardfolk Shocker, Lizardfolk Dreadtail, Lizardfolk Dreadnought, Lizardfolk Chief, Lizardfolk Marsh Mystic	Lizardfolk of the Witchlight Fens
Wolf Runners	120–121		Sylish Kreed, Eveni Redblade, Wolf Runner Swiftarrow	Bandits of the Trade Road

== See also ==
- Monsters in Dungeons & Dragons
- List of Dungeons & Dragons monsters (1974–76)
- List of Dungeons & Dragons monsters (1977–94)
- List of Advanced Dungeons & Dragons 2nd edition monsters
- List of Dungeons & Dragons 3rd edition monsters
- List of Dungeons & Dragons 5th edition monsters
