= Songs & Swords =

Songs & Swords is a series of novels by Elaine Cunningham, set in the Forgotten Realms campaign setting.

== Plot summary ==
The Songs & Swords series covers the adventures of the Harper agents Arilyn Moonblade and Danilo Thann.

== Novels ==
The first four volumes in this series were re-issues of novels previously released as part of the Harpers series.

- Elfshadow (previously released as The Harpers 2 in October 1991; paperback, April 2000, ISBN 978-0-7869-1660-3)
- Elfsong (previously released as The Harpers 8 in January 1994; paperback, April 2000, ISBN 978-0-7869-1661-0)
- Silver Shadows (previously released as The Harpers 13 in June 1996; paperback, January 2001, ISBN 978-0-7869-1799-0)
- Thornhold (previously released as The Harpers 16 in August 1998; paperback, February 2001, ISBN 978-0-7869-1808-9)
- The Dream Spheres (paperback, May 1999, ISBN 978-0-7869-1342-8)

== Reception ==
Songs and Swords Series appeared on the 2024 Game Rant "31 Best Dungeons & Dragons Novels, Ranked" list at #22.
