= Elfsong =

1994 fantasy novel

- Cover art by John & Laura Lakey
- Author: Elaine Cunningham
- Cover artist: John and Laura Lakey
- Series: Songs & Swords
- Genre: Fantasy
- Set in: Forgotten Realms
- Publisher: TSR
- Publication date: 1994
- ISBN: 978-1560761174
- Preceded by: Elfshadow
- Followed by: Silver Shadows

Elfsong is a fantasy novel by Elaine Cunningham published by TSR in 1994 that continues The Harpers series of Forgotten Realms novels. (The Forgotten Realms is a campaign world used in the fantasy role-playing game Dungeons & Dragons.) Elfsong is the second part of Cunningham's Songs & Swords sub-series that relates the continuing adventures of the Harper agents Arilyn Moonblade and Danilo Thann.

== Plot summary ==
A strange spell is affecting bards throughout the North, tainting their memories and thus eradicating history and legacy. Bard and Harper agent Danilo Thann is sent by Khelben “Blackstaff” Arunsun to solve the mystery.

The force behind the crisis turns out to be Garnet, a former Harper and bard who blames his old colleagues for his current political problems. Garnet intends to spread corruption via Faerûn’s songs themselves. Danilo's search takes him to the streets of Waterdeep and into the farthest spaces of Amn. He has to reclaim the enchanted harp Morninglark to end the lingering curse before it becomes interwoven with history itself.

== Publication history ==
In 1990, TSR published an ad in Writers Digest seeking new authors. Elaine Cunningham was one of those that applied, and she was subsequently assigned to write the second novel in the new TSR series The Harpers. The result was Elfshadow, published in 1991. Cunningham then wrote a sequel, Elfsong, published in 1994, that became the eighth novel in The Harpers series.

Cunningham wrote two more novels for what became known as her Songs & Swords sub-series: Silver Shadows (1996); and the conclusion of The Harpers, Thornhold (1998).

== Reception ==
Don D'Ammassa noted that although Elaine Cunningham had shown signs of improvement in her writing skills from her first novel, Elfshadow, "she has been content to produce game tie-in novels rather than produce work set in a world of her own making." D'Ammassa called the plot of Elfsong "traditional" and noted that it is "so constrained by the limitations of the shared universe that the degree of her improvement is not immediately apparent." D'Ammassa concluded, "Despite her obvious talent and marked improvement, Cunningham seemed content to produce interesting but minor work."

John Bunnell commented "it confirms the author's skilled hand at crafting distinctive characters and intricate thriller plots." Bunnell also thought this book would be a valuable resource for role-players whose adventures occur within the city of Waterdeep. Bunnell concluded, "Hand Elfsong to the next person you meet who claims that TSR doesn't publish quality fiction set in its 'house universes'; this one is a winner regardless of its label."
