= Dukes of Hell =

Play-by-mail role-playing game

- Designers: Vincent J. Marra
- Publishers: Software Doctors
- Years active: ~1985 to unknown
- Genres: Role-playing, fantasy
- Languages: English
- Playing time: fixed
- Materials required: Instructions, order sheets, turn results, paper, pencil
- Media type: Play-by-mail or email

Dukes of Hell is a closed-end, fantasy play-by-mail (PBM) game. It was designed by Vincent J. Marra and published by Software Doctors.

== History and development ==
Dukes of Hell was published by Software Doctors, a company shifting into the PBM genre from computers. Vincent J. Manna was the game designer. Reviewer Frank Picone noted that it was a unique PBM game concept at the time but it did not "delve into the occult." The publisher also provided a disclaimer "to prevent religious groups from attacking the game or the company".

== Gameplay ==
Set in Hades, players roleplay a "top demon" vying to replace Satan. Players, holding the rank of Duke, advanced by controlling additional cities and castles. Elements of gameplay included Psionic Points, used to "cast spells, do miracles, control other Beings and Devils, and sway Demons to aid your cause", and Gold Pieces, used to acquire resources and spy. Magic, intrigue, and politics were part of the game. The game allowed both ground and naval combat. Dungeon crawling was also part of the game.

Monsters in the game included fiends, devils, chimeras, dark elves, dragons, erinyees, gargoyles, ghouls, ghosts, harpies, lemures, manes, quasits, specters, vampires, wights, wizards, and zombies.

== Reception ==
Frank Picone reviewed the game in the January–February 1986 issue of Paper Mayhem, stating that it was his "candidate for best game of the decade".

== See also ==
- List of play-by-mail games

== Bibliography ==
- Picone, Frank (January–February 1986). "Dukes of Hell: The Review". Paper Mayhem. No. 16. pp. 11–13.
- Editors (Autumn 1985). "The Spokesmen Speak: Dukes of Hell". Flagship. No. 8 (US ed.). p. 40.
