= Tangled Webs =

1996 novel by Elaine Cunningham

- Cover
- Language: English
- Genre: Fantasy novel
- Published: 1996
- Publication place: United States
- Media type: Print

Tangled Webs is a fantasy novel by Elaine Cunningham, set in the world of the Forgotten Realms, and based on the Dungeons & Dragons role-playing game. It is the second novel published in the "Starlight & Shadows" series. It was published in hardcover in April 1996, ISBN 978-0-7869-0516-4 and in paperback in May 1998, ISBN 978-0-7869-0698-7 with a paperback re-issue in March 2003, ISBN 978-0-7869-2959-7).

== Plot summary ==
Tangled Webs follows drow wizard Liriel Baenre and Rashemen berserker Fyodor on a journey, which include escape from the Underdark and a sea voyage. Due to finding a mysterious amulet windwalker, Liriel stumbles upon a mysterious runecraft, which supposedly would allow her to retain her drow magic on the surface. During the hectic escape, she meets Fyodor, who also searches for the amulet, as the witches of Rashemen told him it is a solution for his own problem. As a berserker, Fyodor is able to call upon magic, which allows him to fight despite injuries. However, as a child born in Time of Troubles, he cannot control his rage and see a difference between ally and enemy. The two heroes make an alliance, travelling together to the land of Rashemen with windwalker, while avoiding forces which would claim its power for themselves.

== Reception ==
Trenton Webb reviewed Tangled Webs for Arcane magazine, rating it a 7 out of 10 overall. He commented that "B-movies aren't just fun because you can spot the wires, invariably predict the clichéd plot and see the sets wobble from time to time. They're enjoyable because you get the feeling that the crew had a brilliant time making them. Tangled Webs shares this sense of tongue-in-cheek, self-mocking, gung-ho fun in a non-stop barrage of increasingly hostile situations hung extremely loosely around a sketchy plot. Liriel, the oddest Drow you ever met and Fyodor, her Beserker boyfriend, hex and hack their way through an overly long sea voyage from Skullport to Ruathym. The obligatory political intrigue is supplied by the conspiracies of the Northern powers of the Forgotten Realms." He felt that "It's not the destination nor the schemes which are employed that are especially important though. It's the spirit that makes the book happen - the gut-spilling sword action, flashy spell casting and ensemble of characters pushes Tangled Webs from chapter to chapter with a wanton disregard for anything but having fun. The trip on the grand ship Elfmaid is made not just bearable but quite brilliant by the good Captain Hrolf setting up and solving all kinds of situations with a deft flick of a blade, a knowing glance or an impressive show of sheer bravado. His First Mate supplies sour-faced cynicism, and Xorsh the Sea-elf is your off-the-peg innocent. Together they roll across the ocean battling everything from Laskan pirates to vast Water Elementals." Webb added that "With the principals foiling deadly threats at the last second while the supporting cast wander about inadvertently creating yet another world of trouble, each chapter of the book is an exciting adventure in itself. Unfortunately, some of the spells cast or actions taken are less than convincing, but nevertheless, it's pleasantly easy to get carried away with this wild romp." He continued: "Sadly, the bubbling wave of ever-increasing adventuring energy falters short of the final chapter, which results in the villains it's taken Liriel 300 pages to meet being dispatched in a mere line or two. This really is a shame, because the archetypal adventure heroes developed in this book deserve a much bigger showdown, and these few lines seem woefully inadequate for the job at hand. What's more, these evil controllers of mighty magic and vast armies fought in the final battle prove less threatening than the ghoul on page four!" Webb concluded his review by saying "Purists are bound to condemn Tangled Webs for Liriel's complete lack of Drowness. DMs trying to run the new Forgotten Realms North campaign may well curse it for giving away too many secrets of this new land. Literature heads will no doubt have a pop at it because it's a Dungeons & Dragons book and not a proper novel. But if, when you're completely honest, you prefer B-movies to art-house cinema, then you should give Tangled Webs a shot!"
