= Starlight and Shadows =

Novel series

Starlight & Shadows is a series of novels by Elaine Cunningham, set in the Forgotten Realms campaign setting.

== Plot summary ==
The Starlight & Shadows trilogy covers the adventures of the drow outcast Liriel Baenre and her companion, Fyodor of Rashemen.

== Novels ==
- Daughter of the Drow (hardcover, August 1995, ISBN 978-0-7869-0165-4; paperback, September 1996, ISBN 978-0-7869-0514-0; paperback re-issue, February 2003, ISBN 978-0-7869-2929-0)
- Tangled Webs (hardcover, April 1996, ISBN 978-0-7869-0516-4; paperback, May 1998, ISBN 978-0-7869-0698-7; paperback re-issue, March 2003, ISBN 978-0-7869-2959-7)
- Windwalker (hardcover, April 2003, ISBN 978-0-7869-2968-9; paperback, April 2004, ISBN 978-0-7869-3184-2)

The Starlight & Shadows trilogy was later reprinted in:

- Starlight & Shadows Gift Set (three paperbacks in boxed slipcase, August 2005, ISBN 978-0-7869-3816-2)

== Reception ==
Starlight & Shadows appeared on the 2025 Screen Rant "10 Best Forgotten Realms Book Series, Ranked" list at #7.
