= Evermeet: Island of Elves =

English language fantasy novel

- Cover of the first edition
- Author: Elaine Cunningham
- Language: English
- Genre: Fantasy novel
- Published: 1998 (hardcover); 1999 (paperback)
- Publication place: United States
- Media type: Print (Paperback)
- ISBN: 978-0-7869-0713-7 (hardcover); 978-0-7869-1354-1 (paperback)

Evermeet: Island of Elves is a fantasy novel by Elaine Cunningham, set in the world of the Forgotten Realms, and based on the Dungeons & Dragons role-playing game. It was published in hardcover in April 1998 and in paperback in March 1999.

== Plot summary ==
Evermeet: Island of Elves is a novel about the Island of Evermeet, a refuge for the elves against evil hordes large enough to destroy empires, and under threat from pirates, mercenaries, wizards, renegade elves and groups of dragons. The novel presents pieces of history from the settlement of the island kingdom up to the present day, where the drow begin a destructive attack.

== Reception ==
Evermeet: Island of Elves appeared on the 2024 Game Rant "31 Best Dungeons & Dragons Novels, Ranked" list at #29.

One reviewer commented: "Evermeet Island of Elves by Elaine Cunningham is basically THE history of the elven races and their homelands within the Forgotten Realms world."

== Reviews ==
- Review by Chris Gilmore (1998) in Interzone, #137 November 1998
