= Troll (Dungeons & Dragons) =

Fictional monster in Dungeons & Dragons

- An illustration of two trolls from the 1977 Advanced Dungeons & Dragons Monster Manual
- First appearance: Dungeons & Dragons "white box" set (1974)

In-universe information
- Type: Giant
- Alignment: Chaotic Evil

Trolls are fictional monsters in the Dungeons & Dragons roleplaying game.

== Publication history ==
While trolls can be found throughout folklores worldwide, the D&D troll has little in common with these. Instead it was inspired partly by Norse myth, and partly by a troll that appears in Poul Anderson's Three Hearts and Three Lions, which is especially apparent in their ability to "regenerate" (their bodies to heal wounds extremely rapidly), and their weakness to fire. They appear as tall, thin, ungainly humanoids of low intelligence, with long noses and rubbery, greenish skin. Trolls are characteristic denizens of many AD&D worlds.

=== Dungeons & Dragons (1974–1976) ===
The troll was one of the first monsters introduced in the earliest edition of the game, in the Dungeons & Dragons "white box" set (1974), where they are described as "thin and rubbery", and "loathsome" creatures which have the ability to regenerate.

=== Advanced Dungeons & Dragons 1st edition (1977–1988) ===
The troll appears in the first edition Monster Manual (1977), where they are described as "horrid carnivores" that fear nothing and are able to regenerate damage taken.

Several new varieties of troll were introduced in the Fiend Folio (1981), including the giant two-headed troll, the giant troll, the ice troll, and the spirit troll. The module The Lost Caverns of Tsojcanth (1982) introduced the marine troll, also known as the "scrag", which was later reprinted in Monster Manual II (1983).

The black troll and rock troll were introduced in Dragon #141, in the "Dragon's Bestiary" column (January 1989).

=== Dungeons & Dragons (1977–1999) ===
This edition of the D&D game included its own version of the troll, in the Dungeons & Dragons Basic Set (1977), and Expert Set (1981 & 1983). The troll was featured as a player character race in the gazetteer The Orcs of Thar (1989). Trolls were also later featured in the Dungeons & Dragons Game set (1991), the Dungeons & Dragons Rules Cyclopedia (1991), the Classic Dungeons & Dragons Game set (1994), and the Dungeons & Dragons Adventure Game set (1999).

=== Advanced Dungeons & Dragons 2nd edition (1989–1999) ===
The troll appears first in the Monstrous Compendium Volume One (1989), and is reprinted in the Monstrous Manual (1993) along with several troll variants.

The Monstrous Compendium Fiend Folio Appendix (1992) reintroduced the ice troll. The snow troll first appeared in Dungeon #43 (September 1993), and was later reprinted in the Monstrous Compendium Annual Volume One (1994).

Several new types of trolls were introduced in Dragon #199's "Dragon's Bestiary" column (November 1993), including the fire troll the gray troll, the phaze troll, the stone troll, and the trollhound. The fire troll was later reintroduced in Paizo's Dragon Compendium, Volume 1 (2005).

Monstrous Compendium Annual Four (1998) included the Far Realm creature, the troll mutate.

=== Dungeons & Dragons 3.0 edition (2000–2002) ===
The troll appears in the Monster Manual for this edition (2000).

The troll is further detailed in Dragon #301 (November 2002), in "The Ecology of the Troll", which also introduced the deep sea troll, the fiendish troll, the ice troll, the rock troll, and the scrag.

Savage Species (2003) presented the troll as both a race and a playable class. The Forgotten Realms product Unapproachable East (2003) introduced the fell troll, the ice troll, the mur-zhagul (or demon troll), and the slime troll.

=== Dungeons & Dragons 3.5 edition (2003–2007) ===
The troll appears in the revised Monster Manual for this edition (2003), which also included information on the scrag. Several new trolls were introduced in Monster Manual III (2004), including the cave troll, the crystalline troll, the forest troll, the mountain troll, and the war troll. The wasteland troll was introduced in Sandstorm: Mastering the Perils of Fire and Sand (2005), the filth-eater troll and the tunnel thug troll were introduced in Drow of the Underdark (2007), and the bladerager troll was introduced in Monster Manual V (2007).

=== Dungeons & Dragons 4th edition (2008–2014) ===
The troll appears in the Monster Manual for this edition (2008), along with the war troll and fell troll.

=== Dungeons & Dragons 5th edition (2014-present) ===
The troll appears in the Monster Manual for this edition (2014), while the dire troll, rot troll, spirit troll and venom troll all appear in Mordenkainen's Tome of Foes.

== Ecology ==
=== Environment ===
Trolls are most often found in cold, mountainous regions, but can be encountered nearly anywhere.

=== Typical physical characteristics ===
The average troll stands nine feet high and weighs roughly 500 pounds, though females tend to be a bit larger than males. The hide of trolls is rubbery, and usually either moss green, putrid grey, or mottled gray and green. Their coarse hair is typically iron grey, or greenish-black.

Trolls initially seem to be somewhat shorter than they actually are, due to their sagging shoulders and tendency to hunch forward. They walk with an uneven gait, and their arms dangle and drag the ground when running. Despite this apparent awkwardness, trolls are quite agile.

Trolls are infamous for their regenerative abilities, able to recover from the most grievous of wounds or regenerate entire limbs given time. Severing a troll's head results merely in temporary incapacitation, rather than death. After cutting off a troll's head or other limbs, one must seal the wounds with fire or acid to prevent regeneration. Because of this, most adventurers will typically carry some sort of implement capable of creating fire.

=== Alignment ===
Trolls are usually chaotic evil.

== Society ==
Trolls speak Giant, and usually worship Vaprak the Destroyer.

== Troll variants ==
- Black trolls – Also known as "demon trolls", these horned trolls reside in the Abyss and possess powerful magical abilities.
- Blood trolls – Lawful evil red-skinned trolls who often serve devils.
- Cave trolls – Powerful, feral trolls that often live underground.
- Crystalline trolls – Charismatic trolls with crystalline skin.
- Deep sea trolls – These trolls have a primal connection to water. They terrorize the oceans and coastlines.
- Desert trolls – Chameleon-like, intelligent ambush hunters.
- Dire trolls - Trolls turned larger by devouring other trolls and sticking their cut appendages onto themselves and having them regenerate as part of their bodies.
- Fell trolls – Huge, two-headed trolls. In 4th edition, these simply became larger trolls.
- Fire trolls – Immune to fire and acid.
- Forest trolls – Includes variant "muskwarts".
- Gray trolls – Having been nearly energy drained to death by undead creatures, these emaciated trolls forge strong ties to negative energy and have venomous spittle.
- Ice trolls – Cold-dwelling trolls.
- Mountain trolls – Massive trolls that prowl mountains. Includes variant Halruuan mountain trolls.
- Mur-Zhaguls – Planetouched creatures descended from the mingling of trolls and demons.
- Phaze trolls – Mutated by great concentrations of magic or Underdark radiations, these trolls possess some magical powers and are more intelligent than their brethren.
- Pseudo-trolls – Trolls from the Far Realm with the pseudonatural creature template.
- Rock trolls – Trolls with an affinity for earth, they possess natural camouflage in areas of stone. Rock trolls sometimes are found on the Elemental Plane of Earth.
- Rot trolls - Troll infused with necrotic energy, robbing them of their regenerative powers, instead emanating degenerative auras.
- Scrags – These are aquatic cousins of the troll.
- Slime trolls – The bodies of these underground-dwelling trolls constantly secrete acid.
- Spirit trolls – Spirit trolls are a crossbreed of trolls and invisible stalkers. In 5th Edition, a spirit troll is a troll blasted with psychic energie, who regenerates into a nonphysical form.
- Stone trolls – Stone trolls have rough, somewhat rocky skin and are generally native to mountain ranges
- Tree trolls – Small arboreal trolls created by magic gone awry.
- Troll hunters – Ordinary, though more cunning than usual trolls who are not satisfied with merely eating civilized beings but train to hunt them relentlessly.
- Two-headed trolls – These creatures are horrendous crossbreeds of trolls and ettins.
- Venom trolls - Trolls mutated by massive doses of poison, allowing them to deal poison damage and even use their own poisonous blood in offensive manners.
- War trolls – Trolls bred for war that form mercenary companies.
- Wasteland trolls – Found in mountains and badlands of the deserts.

== Related creatures ==
- Thouls – Combinations of trolls, hobgoblins, and ghouls. These are usually unique to the Mystara setting.
- Trollhounds – Wolf-like creatures that share many of the same traits as trolls, including the powerful regenerative capabilities. They often associate with trolls.
- Gnolls – When the gnoll as a creature was still in development, it was meant to be a hybrid between a gnome and a troll (hence the name "gnoll"). The designers abandoned the hybrid idea and gave the name to a creature with a Hyena-like appearance.

== Critical reception ==
The troll was ranked second among the ten best mid-level monsters by the authors of Dungeons & Dragons For Dummies. The authors described the troll as "a great mid-level monster that can challenge heroes for a number of levels" noting that "the troll is the players' first introduction to a regenerating monster – a creature that's almost impossible to kill unless you've got fire handy".

Game designers Paul Karczag and Lawrence Schick considered the troll one of the "five main "humanoid" races" in the AD&D game.

Role-playing game author Graeme Davis considered Dungeons & Dragons a major factor in current perceptions that "giants and trolls are regarded as very different creatures", while the names were used interchangeably in Norse mythology.

== Miniatures ==
Trolls appear in the D&D Miniatures: Harbinger set #77 (2003).

== Other publishers ==
The troll is fully detailed in Paizo Publishing's book Classic Monsters Revisited (2008), on pages 58–63.
