= Daughter of the Drow =

1995 novel by Elaine Cunningham

- Cover of the first edition
- Language: English
- Series: Starlight and Shadows
- Genre: Fantasy novel
- Published: 1995
- Publication place: United States
- Media type: Print (Hardcover and Paperback)

Daughter of the Drow is a fantasy novel by Elaine Cunningham, set in the world of the Forgotten Realms, and based on the Dungeons & Dragons role-playing game. It is the first novel in the "Starlight & Shadows" series. It was published in hardcover, August 1995, ISBN 978-0-7869-0165-4; and in paperback, September 1996, ISBN 978-0-7869-0514-0; paperback re-issue, February 2003, ISBN 978-0-7869-2929-0.

== Plot summary ==
Daughter of the Drow is a novel set in the Underdark featuring a drow princess who wants to escape from her life as a priestess of the evil spider-god, and encounters a berserker warrior and becomes involved in a quest involving a talisman of power and finds true love.

== Reception ==
A book review in The Capital called the book "a worthy read", citing Liriel Baenre as the main character and noting that she is talented at spellcasting.

Gideon Kibblewhite reviewed Daughter of the Drow for Arcane magazine, rating it a 4 out of 10 overall. He found the novel "disappointing" and calls Daughter of the Drow "a stab at a mini-series that quickly degenerates into a weak soap opera. The only interesting character is Gromph, the bitter and twisted archmage, and he rarely makes an appearance after the opening. The rest of the cast creak almost as loudly as the plot." He continues, "But most sadly lacking is any feel or atmosphere. Although most of the action takes place deep within caverns of the Underdark, there is no fear, mystery or suspense. There are plenty of wands, portals and monsters, but alone they are not enough to engage the reader." Kibblewhite concludes his review by saying "There are, though, some good moments; like the spectacular duel between two wizards in the centre of a volcano, or the scene when, as Gromph is about to cast his daily spell to re-start the city clock, a flock of evil spider-priestesses fly by on magic discs. Unfortunately, such moments are few and far between and fail to lift the story out of the ordinary."
