= Thornhold =

Thornhold is a fantasy novel by Elaine Cunningham, set in the world of the Forgotten Realms, and based on the Dungeons & Dragons game.

== Reviews ==
- SF Site
- Review by James Lowder (1999) in Sci-Fi Universe February 1999
