= Lycanthrope (Dungeons & Dragons) =

Class of fictional entities from Dungeons & Dragons

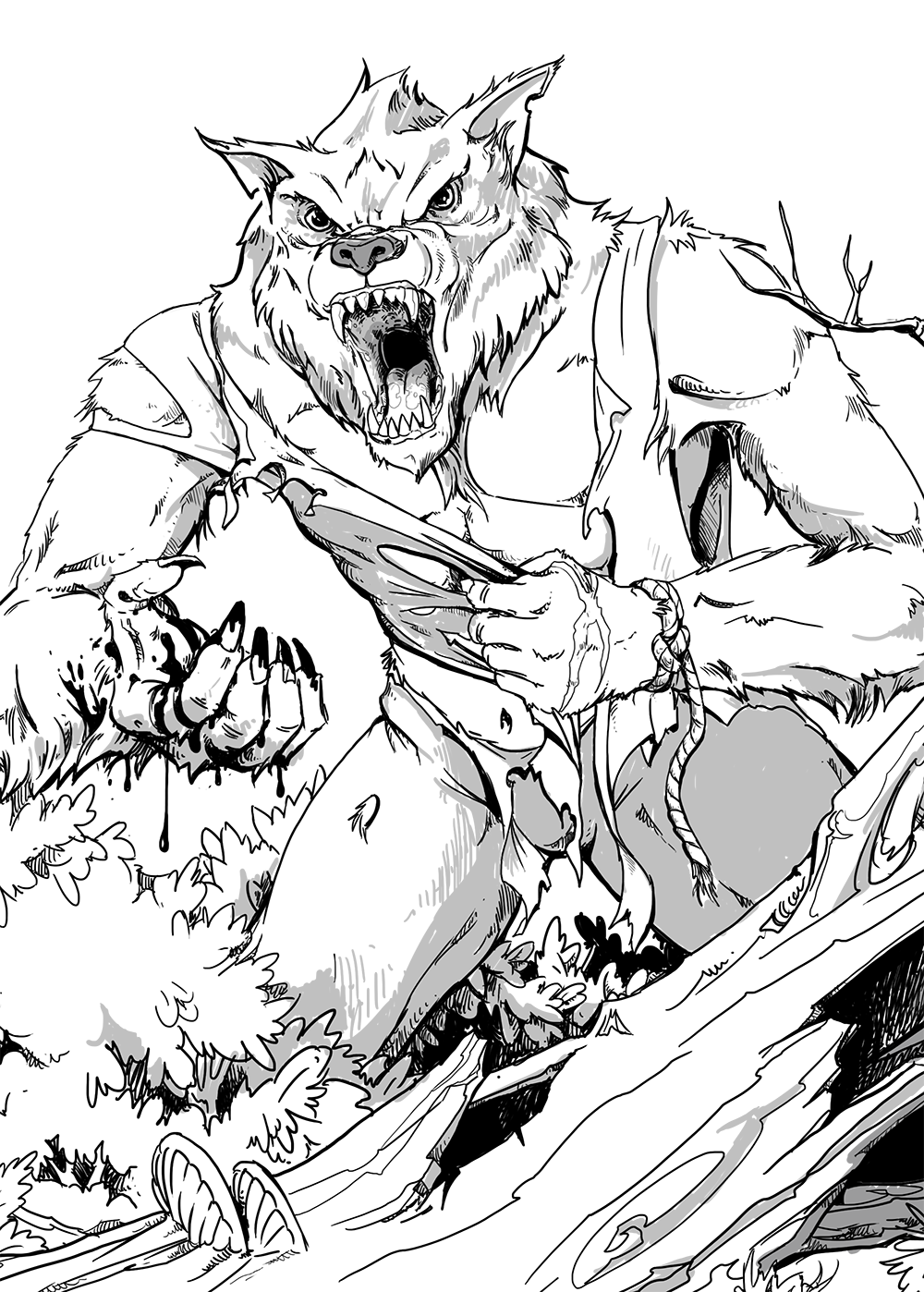
- First appearance: the original Dungeons & Dragons "white box" set (1974)
- Based on: Shapeshifting

In-universe information
- Type: Humanoid

In Dungeons & Dragons, a lycanthrope (/ˈlaɪkənθroʊp/ LY-kən-throhp or /laɪˈkænθroʊp/ ly-KAN-throhp) is a humanoid shapeshifter based on various legends of lycanthropes, werecats, and other such beings. In addition to the werewolf, in Dungeons & Dragons, weretigers, wereboars, werebears and other shapeshifting creatures similar to werewolves and related beings are considered lycanthropes, although traditionally, the term "lycanthrope" refers to a wolf-human combination exclusively. The presence of lyncanthropes in the gaming system is one of the elements that has led Christian fundamentalists to condemn Dungeons & Dragons and to associate it with the occult.

== Description ==
Inspired by various tales of folklore worldwide, in the standard Dungeons & Dragons rules, lycanthropy is both hereditary (the children of lycanthropes are lycanthropes of the same type) and infectious (victims of lycanthrope bites become lycanthropes themselves, of the same type as the attacker). The rules distinguish between natural and afflicted lycanthropes, according to the cause of lycanthropy, and handle them by different rules.

Hereditary lycanthropes can change shape at will, and retain their personality, being in control of their actions. Infected lycanthropes' shapechanges are affected by the full moon. They usually are not aware of their actions and act as aggressive predators. Lycanthropes can assume the form of an animal/humanoid hybrid, in addition to their animal form. Most lycanthropes in animal form can communicate with animals of their type. In humanoid form, they can use any weapon, and in animal form they use natural weapons like the corresponding animals, but each type has a different fighting style in hybrid form.

Afflicted shapechangers, whose condition could be transmitted like a disease; some available as player character races.
While a "[t]raditional monster" with "the connotation of 'man' degraded into 'beast,'" depiction of the werewolf is related to those in 1930s and 1940s Hollywood movies like The Wolf Man.

Screen Rant has described the operation of lycanthropy in the game as an aspect that "makes no sense" because it is often a positive development for a character. "It is possible for a character to be infected with lycanthropy in Dungeons & Dragons and it comes highly recommended, as the benefits outweigh the negatives". It notes that "[i]n exchange for learning how to control your condition, you gain Damage Reduction, +2 to your Wisdom stat, the Scent ability, Low-Light Vision, a new Hit Dice, the Iron Will feat, and the ability to transform into a more powerful form". Like many examples of werewolves in modern fiction, D&D's werewolves and other lycanthropes are vulnerable to silver and highly resistant to other kinds of harm.

An illustration in one edition of the Monster Manual implied that the beast in Disney's Beauty and the Beast was a lycanthrope, with a creature having a resemblance to the Beast attacking a human resembling that film's antagonist, Gaston.

The archetypal lycanthrope, the werewolf, was ranked sixth among the ten best low-level monsters by the authors of Dungeons & Dragons For Dummies. The authors described the werewolf as "a classic monster" and "the best illustration of a monster with damage reduction; unless characters have a silver weapon, they will have a hard time hurting this creature". The authors also note that "Werewolves are shapechangers, which means players can never be entirely sure whether that surly villager might indeed be the great black wolf who attacked their characters out in the forest." The werewolf is also fully detailed in Paizo Publishing's book Classic Horrors Revisited (2009), on pages 58–63.

The werebear had his source in the character of Beorn in J.R.R. Tolkien's The Hobbit. Aardy R. DeVarque speculated that the wereboar may have been inspired by the tale of Circe within Homer's Odyssey, the werefox by mythologies of the Indigenous peoples of North America, and the weretiger by Hindu mythology.

== Publication history ==
=== Dungeons & Dragons (1974–1976) ===
The werebear, the wereboar, the weretiger, and the werewolf first appeared in the original Dungeons & Dragons "white box" set (1974). The wererat (or rat men) first appeared in the Greyhawk supplement (1975). Lycanthropes in general were further detailed in the 1975 Blackmoor supplement.

Present in the game since its inception, an image of a werewolf's face by Gygax' childhood friend Tom Keogh was "[a]lmost certainly the oldest piece of art" in the original D&D.

=== Advanced Dungeons & Dragons 1st edition (1977–1988) ===
The werebear, the wereboar, the wererat, the weretiger, and the werewolf appeared in the first edition of Advanced Dungeons & Dragons in the original Monster Manual (1977). The werebear, the wereboar, the wererat, the weretiger, and the werewolf appeared as player character races in Dragon #24 (April 1979). The werebear appeared as a character class in White Dwarf #17, by Lewis Pulsipher. The werebadger, the werebison, the weredire, the werejaguar, the wereleopard, the werelion, the wereram, the weresabre, the weresloth, and the wereweasel appeared in Dragon #40 (August 1980). The foxwoman and the wereshark first appeared in the original Monster Manual II (1983).

=== Dungeons & Dragons (1977–1999) ===
The werebear, the wereboar, the wererat, the weretiger, and the werewolf appeared in the Dungeons & Dragons Basic Set (1977, 1981, 1983). The devil swine appeared in the D&D Expert Set (1981, 1983). The wereshark appeared in the adventure module The War Rafts of Kron (1984). The werebat, the werefox, and the wereseal appeared in the Master Rules set (1985). All of these lycanthropes appeared in the Dungeons & Dragons Rules Cyclopedia (1991). The devil swine, the werebat, the werebear, the wereboar, the werefox, the werejaguar, the greater wererat, the wereseal, the wereshark, the weretiger, and the werewolf appeared as player character classes in Night Howlers (1992).

In a review of Night Howlers by game designer Rick Swan, he describes D&D game lycanthropes as disease victims rather than members of a unique race. Any human player character can become a werecreature. Players using lycanthropic PCs must keep two sets of statistics, one for the human form, another for the beast, using the Werecreature Character Record Sheet, a single-page form that comes with the package. The "Werewolves' Manual" allows most special abilities to be received as level advancement bonuses. The D&D rules require lycanthropy victims to assume the alignment of their beast-form, which is usually Chaotic, but Night Howlers allows a PC lycanthrope to make a saving throw when transforming; a successful throw enables a bestial PC to retain the alignment of his human form. Normally, an infected PC automatically transforms during the full moon, but Night Howlers enables him to resist the change with a successful saving throw; conversely, he may transform voluntarily by making a Constitution check, modified by the phase of the moon, and at higher levels a lycanthrope can change into an intermediate "beast-man," combining the special abilities of both his animal and human forms. The combat section clarifies the effects of damage—an injury suffered by the active form can affect the inactive form as well—and suggests penalties for lycanthropes who do not get enough rest.

=== Advanced Dungeons & Dragons 2nd edition (1989–1999) ===
The werebear, the wererat, the weretiger, and the werewolf appeared in the second edition of Advanced Dungeons & Dragons in the Monstrous Compendium Volume One (1989), and the wereboar and the werefox (foxwoman) appeared in the Monstrous Compendium Volume Two (1989); all of these were reprinted in the Monstrous Manual (1993). The werepanther and the werepanther lord appeared in Monstrous Compendium Annual Volume Two (1995). The werespider appeared in Monstrous Compendium Annual Volume Three (1996). The wererat was expanded in further detail in Dragon #251 (September 1998).

The werebison, the werecat, the weredog, the weredolphin, the wereleopard, the wereowl ("wrowl"), the werepanther, and the werespider appeared for the Forgotten Realms setting in Hall of Heroes (1989). The werecrocodile appeared for the Forgotten Realms setting in Old Empires (1990), and reprinted in Monstrous Compendium Annual Volume Three (1996). The werebat and the wereraven appeared for the Ravenloft setting in the Monstrous Compendium Ravenloft Appendix (1991), and reprinted in the Monstrous Manual (1993) and Ravenloft Monstrous Compendium Appendices I & II (1996). The werebat appeared for the Forgotten Realms setting in Drow of the Underdark (1991) and the Monstrous Compendium Forgotten Realms Appendix II (1991) under the "bat, deep" entry. The werehyena and the werelion appeared for the Al-Qadim setting in the Monstrous Compendium Al-Qadim Appendix (1992). The werebadger and the werejaguar appeared for the Ravenloft setting in Van Richten's Guide to Werebeasts (1993), and the loup du noir (skin-changer) appeared in Dark of the Moon (1993); these were reprinted in Monstrous Compendium Annual Volume One (1994). The werejaguar and the wereswine appeared for the Mystara setting in the Mystara Monstrous Compendium Appendix (1994). The wereshark appeared for the Forgotten Realms setting in the City of Splendor boxed set (1994), and reprinted in the Monstrous Compendium Annual Volume Two (1995). The werejackal, the werejaguar, the wereleopard, Ravenloft Monstrous Compendium Appendix III: Creatures of Darkness (1994)

=== Dungeons & Dragons 3rd edition (2000–2007) ===
The lycanthrope appeared as a creature template in the third edition Monster Manual (2000), and in the 3.5 revised Monster Manual (2003); sample creatures included the werebear, the wereboar, the wererat, the weretiger, and the werewolf. Several lycanthropes are presented for the Forgotten Realms setting in Monsters of Faerûn (2001) including the werebat, werecrocodile, and the wereshark. Lycanthropes are presented as player character races in Races of Faerûn (2003). The werebear, the wereboar, the wererat, the weretiger, and the werewolf appeared as player character races in Dragon #313 (November 2003). The werecrocodile is also presented again in Sandstorm (2005).

The loup-garou (Mountain & Lowland), werebadger, werejackal, werejaguar, wereleopard, wereray and wereraven were presented for the Ravenloft setting in Denizens of Darkness (for 3.0) and Denizens of Dread (3.5).

=== Dungeons & Dragons 4th edition (2008–2014) ===
The wererat and the werewolf appeared in the fourth edition in Monster Manual (2008). The wereserpent appeared in the Forgotten Realms Campaign Guide (2008), the wereboar. The weretiger, and the werewolf lord appeared in Monster Manual 2 (2009).

=== Dungeons & Dragons 5th edition (2014–) ===
The werebear, wereboar, weretiger, wererat, and werewolf appeared in the fifth edition Monster Manual (2014). The wereraven appeared in the module, Curse of Strahd (2016). The werebat was added in the Dungeon of the Mad Mage module.

== Core types ==
The following lycanthropes are described in every edition of Dungeons and Dragons so far:

Type	Alignment	Habitat	Favored weapons in hybrid form
Wereboar	neutral	temperate forests	gore attack combined with a weapon
Wererat	lawful evil	anywhere	rapiers and hand crossbows
Weretiger	neutral	warm forests	claws
Werewolf	chaotic evil	temperate forests	teeth and claws

== Other lycanthropes and related creatures ==
Several other versions of lycanthropes have been described over the various editions of the D&D rules, most of them based on carnivorous animals. This list includes werebears, wererats, weretigers, wereboars, werecrocodiles, werebadgers, eredogs, weredolphins, weredragons, werefoxes, werejackals, werepanthers, wereravens, and weresharks. Also included are the seawolves and the foxwomen which deviate a bit from the usual natural/afflicted nature of D&D's lycanthropes.

The wolfwere and jackalwere are often seen as variant offshoots of werecreatures, but are not, in fact, the same type of creature. E.g. jackalweres have been explained as "jackals tainted with a humanoid curse" rather than humans that were cursed to morph into a beast. Similarly the lythari, an elven version of the werewolf, are actually good-aligned and considered protectors of the elven lands.

== Campaign settings ==
=== Forgotten Realms ===
In the Forgotten Realms, many werewolves worship Malar. They may help hunters and others who worship or pay homage to Malar by hunting for them during Winter in areas where this is a concern. Packs of werebeings who worship Malar, will engage in what is called a "High Hunt" in which a human is hunted. If the human evades the pack, they are given one boon. If the human is captured, it will be slain, and eaten.

Beings who have been infected with lycanthropy can control or remove the curse by the administration of a special potion provided by worshipers of Selune. Other beings can learn to control their lycanthropy, such as the Black Wolf. (Information obtained form various Forgotten Realms Novels, Including but not limited to Black Wolf)

=== Eberron ===
In Eberron, lycanthropes don't have alignment restrictions, but are more often evil than good. Lycanthropes of all alignments have been almost eradicated from the world of Eberron due to a zealot effort from the Church of the Silver Flame. Although pushed almost to the point of extinction, Lycanthropes may still be found in small, secluded parts of Khorvaire. Shifters are a race that may have descended from lycanthropes, although they don't have as much shapeshifting capability.

=== Ravenloft ===
In addition to natural and infected lycanthropes, the Ravenloft setting introduces curse-induced lycanthropy as a plot-element. Various types of lycanthropes are given more variety in their mechanics (e.g., weretigers are vulnerable to weapons carved of obsidian instead of silver), and not all infected lycanthropes are affected by the full moon, but change shape based on other circumstances (e.g. the smell of blood). In Ravenloft, lycanthropes are considered universally evil, or at least very susceptible to the corrupting influence of the Demiplane of Dread.

== Reception ==
Scholar Aaron Trammell criticized female-coded lycanthropic opponents present from the beginning of the game: "When women enter the martial sphere, they are made monstrous".
