= Elaine Cunningham =

American novelist (born 1957)

- Born: August 12, 1957 (age 69); New York City, U.S.
- Occupation: Novelist
- Writing career
- Period: 1991–present
- Genres: Fantasy, Science fiction
- Notable works: Forgotten Realms, Starlight & Shadows, and The New Jedi Order novels
- Website: elainecunningham.com

Elaine Cunningham (born August 12, 1957, in New York City) is an American fantasy and science fiction author, especially known for her contributions to the Forgotten Realms campaign setting of the Dungeons & Dragons role playing game.

== Biography ==
Cunningham was born in New York City, and grew up in New York state and New England. A voracious reader since childhood, she earned a degree in music education with a minor in history.

She started writing in 1987, after her older son was born. A lifelong fascination with folklore and mythology led her to the fantasy genre, and her background in music and history gave her an affinity for bards such as Danilo Thann, created for her first novel, Elfshadow (1991). Many of her stories focus on elves, which she attributes to her excessive fondness for cats.

Elves suddenly clicked for me when I realized they're essentially bipedal cats with localized fur. They possess a decidedly feline grace, beauty, and dexterity, not to mention 110% of a cat's attitude.

— Elaine Cunningham

Cunningham is also the New York Times bestselling author of Dark Journey, book 10 from the Star Wars New Jedi Order saga. Shadows in the Starlight (2006), the second book the Changeling Detective series, was named to the 2006 Kirkus Reviews list "Ten Best SciFi Novels."

=== Personal life ===
Now a full-time arts administrator, Cunningham continues to write, albeit mostly in the early morning hours. She lives in coastal Rhode Island.

== Bibliography ==
=== Dungeons & Dragons ===
- Songs & Swords (featuring Arilyn, Danilo and Elaith)
  - I. Elfshadow (1991/2000 reprint)
  - II. Elfsong (1994/2000 reprint)
  - III. Silver Shadows (1996/2001 reprint)
  - IV. Thornhold (1998/2001 reprint)
  - V. The Dream Spheres (1999)
- Spelljammer anthology novellas
  - The Cloakmaster Cycle
    - The Radiant Dragon (1992), ISBN 978-1560763468
- Starlight and Shadows (featuring Liriel, Fyodor, and Gorlist)
  - I. Daughter of the Drow (1995)
  - II. Tangled Webs (1996)
  - III. Windwalker (2003)
- Evermeet: Island of Elves (1998)
- Counselors & Kings (featuring Matteo and Tzigone)
  - I. The Magehound (2000)
  - II. The Floodgate (2001)
  - III. The Wizardwar (2002)
- City of Splendors: A Novel of Waterdeep (With Ed Greenwood; 2005)
- Forgotten Realms anthology novellas
  - The Best of the Realms, Book 1 (2003)
    - "Rite of Blood"—Realms of the Underdark (1996)
  - The Best of the Realms, Book III: The Stories of Elaine Cunningham (2007)
    - "The Bargain"—Realms of Valor (1993)
    - "The More Things Change"—Realms of Infamy (1994)
    - "The Direct Approach"—Realms of Magic (1995)
    - "Secrets of Blood, Spirits of the Sea"—Realms of the Arcane (1997)
    - "The Great Hunt"—Dragon #246 (1998)
    - "Speaking with the Dead"—Realms of Mystery (1998)
    - "Stolen Dreams"—Dragon #259 (1999)
    - "Fire is Fire"—Realms of the Deep (2000)
    - "Possessions"—Dragon #282 (2002)
    - "A Little Knowledge"—Realms of Shadow (2002)
    - "Gorlist's Dragon"—Realms of Dragons (2004)
    - "Games of Chance"—Dragon #335 (2005)
    - "The Knights of Samular"
    - "Tribute"
    - "Answered Prayers"

=== Other ===
- Del Rey's Star Wars books
  - Dark Journey, Book 12 of the New Jedi Order series (featuring Jaina Solo)
- The Changeling Detective Agency series
  - I. Shadows in the Darkness (2004)
  - II. Shadows in the Starlight (2006)
- Pathfinder Tales series
  - Winter Witch (2010), ISBN 978-1-60125-286-9, with Dave Gross
