= Elfshadow =

2011 fantasy novel

Elfshadow is a fantasy novel by Elaine Cunningham, set in the world of the Forgotten Realms, and based on the Dungeons & Dragons game.

== Plot summary ==
Elfshadow is a novel in which Arilyn Moonblade believes she will be the next target of a killer who has been killing members of the Harpers organization.

== Reviews ==
- Kliatt
- Magia i Miecz
- Review by John C. Bunnell (1991) in Dragon Magazine, November 1991
