= Ghouls in popular culture =

A ghoul is a mythical creature originating in pre-Islamic Arabia, often described as hideous human-like monster that dwelt in the desert or other secluded locations in order to lure travellers astray. It was not until Antoine Galland translated the Arabian Nights into French that the western idea of ghoul was introduced. Galland depicted the ghoul as a monstrous creature that dwelled in cemeteries, feasting upon corpses. This definition of the ghoul has persisted until modern times, with ghouls appearing in literature, television and film, as well video games.

== Notable examples ==
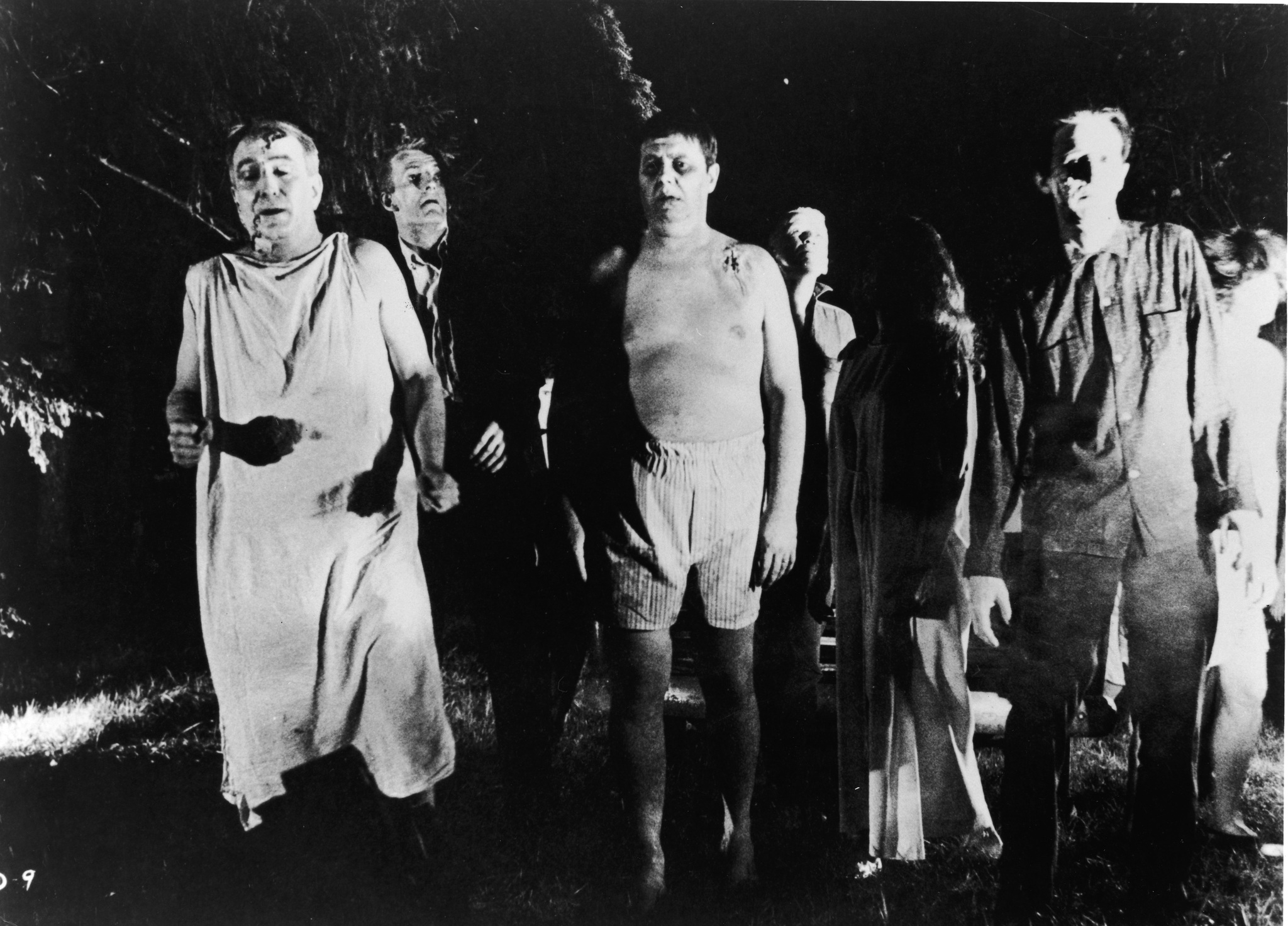
Ghouls swarm around the house, searching for living human flesh.

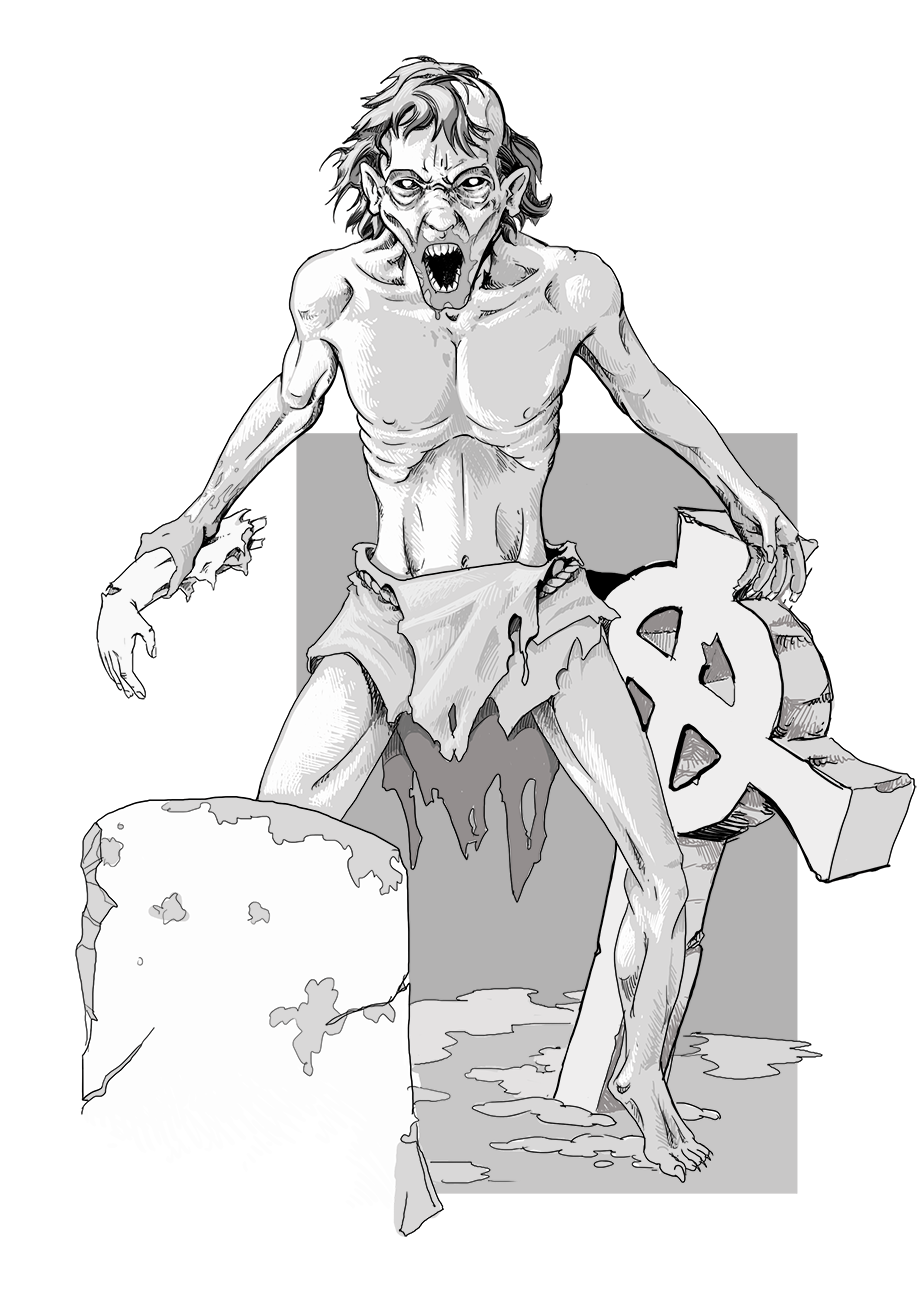
Illustration of a ghoul as described in the game Dungeons and Dragons

- While considered "zombies" by modern standards, the undead monsters of the 1968 film Night of the Living Dead are actually ghouls. They are mentioned as ghouls during a news report the characters watch while trapped inside the house. The writer/director, George A. Romero, has also been quoted in an interview as saying "Actually I never called ours zombies. That description appeared in an article in Cahiers du Cinéma. 'They're zombies,' it said. We originally thought of them as ghouls."
- In the Dungeons & Dragons roleplaying game, ghouls are monstrous, undead humans who reek of carrion and were described as being able to paralyze anyone they touch. They are "more immediately derived from The Dream Quest of Unknown Kadath by H.P. Lovecraft, including their ability to turn a human into a ghoul", than Arabian folklore. A ghoul is said to be created on the death of a man or woman who savored the taste of flesh. They not only eat the dead, but also prey on the unwary living. Ghouls can paralyze their victims with a touch, though elves are immune. Aside from the standard variety, a number of other forms, like the abyssal ghoul, exist. These extraplanar versions of the standard ghoul have fiendish characteristics that make them far more formidable than their cousins. The ghast is similar to the ghoul, but is distinguished by its monstrously foul and supernaturally nauseating stench. The name is taken from creatures appearing The Dream Quest of Unknown Kadath, which have no resemblance to the D&D version aside from generally repulsive features. It is also more powerful than a standard ghoul; even elves can fall victim to a ghast's paralytic touch. It very closely resembles its lesser cousins, but is far more deadly and cunning. They are chaotic evil in alignment. The ghouls in the game "retain the connotation of "man" degraded into "beast" of their traditional counterparts. D&D's ghouls also served as a template for the development of such a creature in the Magic: The Gathering trading card game.
- In J. K. Rowling's Harry Potter series, ghouls are comparatively harmless creatures that live in the homes of wizards, making loud noises and occasionally groaning; a ghoul resides in the attic of the Weasley family's home as the family's pet. Context implies that in the Harry Potter universe, ghouls are closer to animals than human beings. This "innocuous", "somewhat anodyne depiction" in popular children's books "has placed the ghoul at the heart of mainstream film and literature".
- In the post-apocalyptic Fallout computer game series, ghouls are a fictional race of posthuman beings mutated by radiation. Commentators have found ghouls an iconic and recognizable element of the Fallout media franchise.
- In the Amnesia horror video game series, specifically Amnesia: Rebirth and Amnesia: The Bunker, ghouls (also called harvesters) are transformed humans that hunger only for an aetherial substance that comes from humans in pain. In Rebirth it is discovered that they act as laborers on another world, gathering and terrorizing humans in a factory sort of setting. In both games they (and variations on them) are enemies that the player has to avoid by hiding, binding any open wounds, staying calm, and, in the case of The Bunker, utilizing traps and weapons to drive them away temporarily.

== See also ==
- Ghoul (miniseries)
