= List of Dungeons & Dragons modules =

A module in Dungeons & Dragons is an adventure published by TSR. The term is usually applied to adventures published for all Dungeons & Dragons games before 3rd Edition. For 3rd Edition and beyond new publisher Wizards of the Coast uses the term adventure. For a list of published 3rd, 4th, and 5th Edition Adventures see List of Dungeons & Dragons adventures. For description and history of Adventures/Modules see Adventure (D&D). Adventures for various campaign settings are listed in different articles, including Forgotten Realms, Dragonlance, Greyhawk, Mystara, Kara-Tur, Spelljammer, Ravenloft, Al-Qadim, Dark Sun, Planescape, Birthright, and Eberron. Note that this article includes the modules for most of those campaign settings; it excludes most modules for Forgotten Realms, Al-Qadim, and Planescape.

The modules listed here are in three separate lists of official TSR Dungeons & Dragons modules only. The coded modules (1978–1994) are listed by module code. Modules made after the code system was dropped (1993–2000) are displayed in alphabetical order. Note: There is considerable overlap caused by the transition period and early pre-advertising for some modules.

== Coded modules (1978–1994) ==
Module codes in brackets indicate implied codes either by earlier advertising or place in a series; some of these modules did not actually have codes printed on the cover.

=== A ===
A—Aerie of the Slave Lords is a linked campaign of four AD&D (1st Ed.) modules created for Gen Con XIII and set in Greyhawk. They can also form an extended campaign following T and followed by G and Q.

Aerie of the Slave Lords - 1st Ed. AD&D - Greyhawk (Oerth)
Code	TSR#	Title	Levels	Author(s)	Published	Notes
A1	9039	Slave Pits of the Undercity	4–7	David Cook	1980	
A2	9040	Secret of the Slavers Stockade	4–7	Harold Johnson; Tom Moldvay	1981	
A3	9041	Assault on the Aerie of the Slave Lords	4–7	Allen Hammack	1981	
A4	9042	In the Dungeons of the Slave Lords	4–7	Lawrence Schick	1981	
A1–4	9167	Scourge of the Slave Lords	7–11	Various	1986	Revised Compilation; ranked 20th greatest adventure of all time

AC—ACcessory Modules is a series of accessory items for D&D (Basic/Expert/Companion/Master), many of which included mini-adventures. They are generally associated with Mystara albeit quite generic.

ACcessory Modules - BECM D&D - Mystara/Generic
Code	TSR#	Title	Levels	Author(s)	Published	Notes
AC1	9100	The Shady Dragon Inn	N/A	Carl Smith	1983	Pre-generated Characters
AC2	9099	Combat Shield and Mini-adventure: "Treasure of the Hideous One"	4–7	David Cook	1984	Small Module and GM screen
AC3	9121	The Kidnapping of Princess Arelina	2–5	Garry Spiegle	1984	3-D Cardboard Dungeon for Basic and AD&D
AC4	9116	The Book of Marvelous Magic	N/A	Frank Mentzer; Gary Gygax	1985	Magic items also for AD&D
AC5	9037	Player Character Record Sheets	N/A	N/A	1984	Basic/Expert/Companion
AC6	9037	Player Character Record Sheets	N/A	N/A	1985	as AC5 + Master
AC7	9156	Master Player Screen: The Spindle	26–36	Bruce Nesmith	1985	GM Screen & Module
AC8	9145	The Revenge of Rusak	7–9	David Cook	1985	3-D Cardboard Wilderness; mislabeled AC3
AC9	9173	Creature Catalogue	N/A	Various	1986	New monsters
AC10	9211	Bestiary of Dragons and Giants	Multiple	N/A	1987	Adventures using Dragons and Giants
AC11	9220	The Book of Wondrous Inventions	N/A	N/A	1987	Listing of magic items

=== B ===
B—Basic were designed for use with the Dungeons & Dragons Basic set. Mostly they are independent adventures, set in Mystara.

Basic - Basic D&D - Mystara
Code	TSR#	Title	Levels	Author(s)	Published	Notes
B1	9023	In Search of the Unknown	1–3	Mike Carr	1978	First printing provided for location in Greyhawk (Ratik, the Pale or Tenh), although subsequent printings did not.
B2	9034	The Keep on the Borderlands	1–3	Gary Gygax	1979	Generic in terms of setting, though 1987's GAZ1, The Grand Duchy of Karameikos retroactively placed it (here named "Castellan Keep") in northeastern Karameikos in the world of Mystara; and 1999's Return to the Keep on the Borderlands retroactively placed the keep in Greyhawk. Ranked 7th greatest adventure of all time
B3	9044	Palace of the Silver Princess	1–3	Jean Wells (orange), Tom Moldvay (green)	1981	This module had an orange-covered preliminary version which was taken off the market shortly after its publication. This rare original version can be downloaded here: Official download. The module was reworked and released with a green cover.
B4	9049	The Lost City	1–3	Tom Moldvay	1982	Ranked 28th greatest adventure of all time
B5	9078	Horror on the Hill	1–3	Douglas Niles	1983	
B6	9086	The Veiled Society	1–3	David Cook	1984	Includes cardstock minis & buildings
B7	9115	Rahasia	1–3	Tracy Hickman, Laura Hickman	1984 (1979, original)	Acquired by TSR after being previously published. Reprints RPGA1 & 2.
B8	9106	Journey to the Rock	1–3	Michael Malone	1984	
B9	9143	Castle Caldwell and Beyond	1–3	Harry Nuckols	1985	
B1–9	9190	In Search of Adventure	1–3	Various	1987	Abridged Compilation
B10	9149	Night's Dark Terror	2–4	Jim Bambra, Graeme Morris, Phil Gallagher	1986	B/X1 in UK
B11	9260	King's Festival	1	Carl Sargent	1989	
B12	9261	Queen's Harvest	1-2	Carl Sargent	1989	Sequel to B11
BSOLO	9097	Ghost of Lion Castle	1–3	Merle M. Rasmussen	1984	Solo Adventure

=== C ===
C—Competition modules for AD&D (1st) are specially designed for competition play and come with a scoring system for player actions.

Competition - 1st Ed. AD&D - Various
Code	TSR#	Title	Levels	Author(s)	Published	Notes
C1	9032	The Hidden Shrine of Tamoachan	5–7	Harold Johnson, Jeff R. Leason	1980	Origins'79 tournament module set in Greyhawk. Note: The Origins version was titled "Lost Tamoachan" and does not bear the module code. Ranked 18th greatest adventure of all time
C2	9038	The Ghost Tower of Inverness	5–7	Allen Hammack	1980	Wintercon VIII (1979) tournament module set in Greyhawk. Note: The Wintercon version does not bear the module code. Ranked 30th greatest adventure of all time
C3	9110	The Lost Island of Castanamir	1-4	Ken Rolston	1984	Generic setting.
C4	9107	To Find a King	4–7	Bob Blake	1985	From Gen Con XVI. Reprints RPGA3 & RPGA4.
C5	9109	The Bane of Llywelyn	4–7	Bob Blake	1985	Sequel to C4. Reprints RPGA5-8.
C6	9206	The Official RPGA Tournament Handbook	4–8	Daniel Kramarsky, Jean & Bruce Rabe	1987	Features two scenarios, "Honor Guard" and "The Long Way Home";

CA—City of Adventure for AD&D (1st) require the Lankhmar: City of Adventure supplement to play.

City of Adventure - 1st Ed. AD&D - Nehwon (Lankhmar)
Code	TSR#	Title	Levels	Author(s)	Published	Notes
CA1	9150	Swords of the Undercity	8–12	Carl Smith, Bruce Nesmith, Douglas Niles	1986	
CA2	9170	Swords of Deceit	10–15	Stephen Bourne, Ken Rolston, Steve Ecca, Michael Dobson	1986	

CB—Conan the Barbarian modules for AD&D (1st) tie in with the Conan movies.

Conan the Barbarian - 1st Ed. AD&D - Earth (Hyborian Age)
Code	TSR#	Title	Levels	Author(s)	Published	Notes
CB1	9123	Conan Unchained!	10–14	David Cook	1984	
CB2	9124	Conan Against Darkness!	10–14	Ken Rolston	1984	

CM—CoMpanion is for use with Dungeons & Dragons Companion Set (or Rules Cyclopedia), and were set in Mystara.

CoMpanion - Companion D&D - Mystara
Code	TSR#	Title	Levels	Author(s)	Published	Notes
CM1	9117	Test of the Warlords	15+	Douglas Niles	1984	
CM2	9118	Death's Ride	15–20	Garry Spiegle	1984	
CM3	9119	Sabre River	18–22	Douglas Niles, Bruce Nesmith	1984	
CM4	9128	Earthshaker!	18–20	David Cook	1985	
CM5	9154	Mystery of the Snow Pearls	15–25	Anne Gray McCready	1985	Solo Adventure Magic Viewer System
CM6	9158	Where Chaos Reigns	17–19	Graeme Morris	1985	
CM7	9166	The Tree of Life	Elves 8+	Bruce A. Heard	1986	
CM8	9192	The Endless Stair	15–20	Ed Greenwood	1987	
CM9	9210	Legacy of Blood	15–19	Steve Perrin, Katharine Kerr	1987	

=== D ===
D—Drow is a linked campaign of AD&D (1st Ed) modules created for Gen Con XI set in Greyhawk. They can also form an extended campaign following T, A, and G, and followed by Q.

Drow - 1st Ed. AD&D - Greyhawk (Oerth)
Code	TSR#	Title	Levels	Author(s)	Published	Notes
D1	9019	Descent into the Depths of the Earth	9–10+	Gary Gygax	1978	
D2	9020	Shrine of the Kuo-Toa	9	Gary Gygax	1978	
D1–2	9059	Descent into the Depths of the Earth	9–14	Gary Gygax	1981	compilation
D3	9021	Vault of the Drow	10–14	Gary Gygax	1978	

DA—Dave Arneson is set in Blackmoor for Expert Set

Dave Arneson - Expert D&D - Blackmoor
Code	TSR#	Title	Levels	Author(s)	Published	Notes
DA1	9172	Adventures in Blackmoor	10–14	Dave L. Arneson; David J. Ritchie	1986	
DA2	9175	Temple of the Frog	10–14	Dave L. Arneson; David J. Ritchie	1986	
DA3	9191	City of the Gods	10–14	Dave L. Arneson; David J. Ritchie	1987	
DA4	9205	The Duchy of Ten	10–14	David J. Ritchie	1987	

DDA—Dungeons & Dragons Adventure for Basic Set, set in Mystara.

Dungeons & Dragons Adventure - Basic D&D - Mystara
Code	TSR#	Title	Levels	Author(s)	Published	Notes
DDA1	9284	Arena of Thyatis	2–3	John Nephew	1990	
DDA2	9296	Legions of Thyatis	3–4	John Nephew	1990	sequel to DDA1
DDA3	9271	Eye of Traldar	1–2	Carl Sargent	1991	
DDA4	9272	Dymrak Dread	1–3	John Nephew	1991	loose sequel to DDA3

DL—Dragonlance introduced the Dragonlance campaign. They are linked series traditional modules for AD&D (1st Ed) except where noted.

Dragonlance - 1st Ed. AD&D - Dragonlance (Krynn)
Code	TSR#	Title	Levels	Author(s)	Published	Notes
DL1	9130	Dragons of Despair	4–6	Tracy Hickman	1984	Ranked 25th greatest adventure of all time
DL2	9132	Dragons of Flame	5–7	Douglas Niles	1984	
DL3	9131	Dragons of Hope	6–8	Tracy Hickman	1984	
DL4	9139	Dragons of Desolation	6–8	Tracy Hickman, Michael Dobson	1984	
DL5	9135	Dragons of Mystery	N/A	Michael Dobson	1984	Sourcebook
DL6	9140	Dragons of Ice	6–9	Douglas Niles	1985	
DL7	9136	Dragons of Light	7–9	Jeff Grubb	1985	
DL8	9141	Dragons of War	9–10	Tracy Hickman, Laura Hickman	1985	
DL9	9137	Dragons of Deceit	8–10	Douglas Niles	1985	
DL10	9142	Dragons of Dreams	8–10	Tracy Hickman	1985	
DL11	9144	Dragons of Glory	N/A	Douglas Niles; Tracy Hickman	1986	board wargame
DL12	9133	Dragons of Faith	9–10	Harold Johnson, Bruce Heard	1986	
DL13	9176	Dragons of Truth	10–13	Tracy Hickman	1986	
DL14	9180	Dragons of Triumph	10–14	Douglas Niles	1986	Finale of original series
DL15	9231	Mists of Krynn	0–15	various	1988	12 Short Adventures
DL16	9237	World of Krynn	4–12	Douglas Niles, Michael Gray, Harold Johnson	1988	4 Short Adventures

DLA—Dragonlance Adventure trilogy of linked adventures are set on the lost continent of Taladas in the Dragonlance world, for 2nd Edition AD&D.

Dragonlance Adventure - 2nd Ed. AD&D - Dragonlance (Krynn)
Code	TSR#	Title	Levels	Author(s)	Published	Notes
DLA1	9275	Dragon Dawn	5–7	Deborah Christian	1990	Dragonlance module
DLA2	9285	Dragon Knight		Rick Swan	1990	
DLA3	9294	Dragon's Rest	8–9	Rick Swan	1990	Requires Time of the Dragon boxed set

DLC—Dragonlance Classics collects the original Dragonlance modules, revised for 2nd Edition AD&D.

Dragonlance Classics - 2nd Ed. AD&D - Dragonlance (Krynn)
Code	TSR#	Title	Levels	Author(s)	Published	Notes
DLC1	9291	Classics Vol 1	3–8		1990	Compilation of DL1–4
DLC2	9394	Classics Vol. 2	8–12		1993	Compilation of DL6–9
(DLC3)	9453	Classics Vol. 3			1994	Compilation of DL10, 12–14

DL(E/Q/S/T)—Dragonlance (Epic/Quest/Saga/Tales) for 2nd Edition AD&D.

Dragonlance Epic/Quest/Saga/Tales - 2nd Ed. AD&D - Dragonlance (Krynn)
Code	TSR#	Title	Levels	Author(s)	Published	Notes
DLE1	9243	In Search of Dragons	5–8	Rick Swan	1989	Dragonlance module
DLE2	9244	Dragon Magic	5–9	Rick Swan	1989	Sequel to DLE1
DLE3	9245	Dragon Keep	5–9	Rick Swan	1989	Sequel to DLE2
DLQ1	9381	Knight's Sword	1–3	Colin McComb, Thomas M. Reid	1992	Dragonlance module
DLQ2	9382	Flint's Axe	2–4	Tim Beach	1992	Dragonlance module
DLS1	9314	New Beginnings		Mark Acres	1991	Dragonlance module, set in Taladas
DLS2	9319	Tree Lords	1–2	John Terra	1991	Dragonlance module
DLS3	9327	Oak Lords		Blake Mobley	1991	Dragonlance module
DLS4	9334	Wild Elves	4–7	Scott Bennie	1991	Dragonlance module
DLT1	9395	The Land Reborn		John Terra	1993	Dragonlance module, mini-adventures

DQ—DragonQuest is compatible with both AD&D (1st Edition) or DragonQuest RPG

DragonQuest - 1st Ed. AD&D/DragonQuest - Forgotten Realms (Toril)
Code	TSR#	Title	Levels	Author(s)	Published	Notes
DQ1	9221	The Shattered Statue	5–9	Jennell Jaquays (Note: Credited as Paul Jaquays.)	1987	

DS(Q/E)—Dark Sun (Quest/Epic) is a set of linked modules that require Dark Sun campaign setting.

Dark Sun Quest/Epic - 2nd Ed. AD&D - Dark Sun (Athas)
Code	TSR#	Title	Levels	Author(s)	Published	Notes
DS1	2401	Freedom	3	David Cook	1991	
DSQ1	2406	Road to Urik	4–7	David Cook	1992	
DSQ2	2410	Arcane Shadows	5–8	Bill Slavicsek	1992	
DSQ3	2412	Asticlian Gambit	7–10	Anthony Pryor	1992	In the May/June 1993 edition of White Wolf (Issue #36), Berin Kinsman lamented that Asticlian Gambit did not change course from previous modules to set a lighter tone, and concluded by giving the game an average rating of 3 out of 5.
DSE1	2416	Dragon's Crown	10–13	Various	1993	
DSE2	2428	Black Spine	10–13	Walter Baas	1994	

DSM—Dark Sun Mission is a set of linked modules that require the Dark Sun campaign setting.

Dark Sun Mission - 2nd Ed. AD&D - Dark Sun (Athas)
Code	TSR#	Title	Levels	Author(s)	Published	Notes
DSM1	2417	Black Flames	3–6	Sam Witt	1993	
DSM2	2421	Merchant House of Amketch	4–7	L. Richard Baker III	1993	
DSM3	2424	Marauders of Nibenay	6–8;	William W. Connors	1993	

=== E ===
EX—EXtension Series are AD&D modules designed as a "tack-on" adventure set in Greyhawk.

EXtension Series - 1st Ed. AD&D - Greyhawk (Oerth)
Code	TSR#	Title	Levels	Author(s)	Published	Notes
EX1	9072	Dungeonland	9–12	Gary Gygax	1983	Official download
EX2	9073	The Land Beyond the Magic Mirror	9–12	Gary Gygax	1983	Official download

=== G ===
G—Giants is a linked campaign of AD&D (1st Ed) module(s) created for Origins '78 set in Greyhawk. They can also form an extended campaign following A, and followed by D.

Giants - 1st Ed. AD&D - Greyhawk (Oerth)
Code	TSR#	Title	Levels	Author(s)	Published	Notes
G1	9016	Steading of the Hill Giant Chief	8+	Gary Gygax	1978	
G2	9017	Glacial Rift of the Frost Giant Jarl	8+	Gary Gygax	1978	
G3	9018	Hall of the Fire Giant King	8+	Gary Gygax	1978	
G1-2-3	9058	Against the Giants	8–12	Gary Gygax	1981	
GDQ1–7	9179	Queen of the Spiders	8–14	Gary Gygax	1986	Supermodule combining G1–G3, D1–D3, and Q1; Ranked greatest adventure of all time

GA—General Adventure for 2nd Edition AD&D, not specific to any campaign setting.

General Adventure - 2nd Ed. AD&D - Generic
Code	TSR#	Title	Levels	Author(s)	Published	Notes
GA1	9422	The Murky Deep	5–8	Norman B. Ritchie	1993	
GA2	9424	Swamplight	7–9	Jean Rabe	1993	
GA3	9428	Tales of Enchantment	5–8	Jim Musser	1993	

GAZ—GAZetteer The GAZ series described countries in the Known World of Mystara, using the D&D Basic and Expert Set rules, although beginning with GAZ07, rules for adapting to AD&D are provided. However the 15th product in this Mystara Gazetteer series, Dawn of the Emperors: Thyatis and Alphatia, was instead sold as a boxed set without an official GAZ-module code.

GAZetteer - BECM D&D - Mystara
Code	TSR#	Title	Levels	Author(s)	Published	Notes
GAZ1	9193	The Grand Duchy of Karameikos	-	Aaron Allston	1987	
GAZ2	9194	The Emirates of Ylaruam	-	Ken Rolston	1987	
GAZ3	9208	The Principalities of Glantri	-	Bruce Heard	1987	
GAZ4	9215	The Kingdom of Ierendi	-	Anne Gray McCready	1987	
GAZ5	9223	The Elves of Alfheim	-	Steve Perrin	1988	
GAZ6	9227	The Dwarves of Rockhome	-	Aaron Allston	1988	
GAZ7	9230	The Northern Reaches	-	Ken Rolston	1988	
GAZ8	9232	The Five Shires	-	Ed Greenwood	1988	
GAZ9	9236	The Minrothad Guilds	-	Deborah Christian; Kim Eastland	1988	
GAZ10	9241	The Orcs of Thar	-	Bruce Heard	1988	Includes Orc Wars boardgame
GAZ11	9250	The Republic of Darokin	-	Scott Haring	1989	
GAZ12	9246	The Golden Khan of Ethengar	-	Jim Bambra	1989	
GAZ13	9287	The Shadow Elves	-	Carl Sargent; Gary Thomas	1990	
GAZ14	9306	The Atruaghin Clans	-	William W. Connors	1991	
	1037	Dawn of the Emperors: Thyatis and Alphatia	-	Aaron Allston	1989	Sold as a boxed set without an official module code

=== H ===
H—The Bloodstone Pass Saga is a linked campaign series that focuses on using Battlesystem battles in Forgotten Realms AD&D adventures.

The Bloodstone Pass Saga - 1st Ed. AD&D - Forgotten Realms (Toril)
Code	TSR#	Title	Levels	Author(s)	Published	Notes
H1	9122	Bloodstone Pass	13–17	Douglas Niles; Michael Dobson	1985	Battlesystem required
H2	9168	The Mines of Bloodstone	16–18	Michael Dobson; Douglas Niles	1986	
H3	9200	The Bloodstone Wars	17–20	Michael Dobson; Douglas Niles	1987	Battlesystem recommended
H4	9228	The Throne of Bloodstone	18–100	Douglas Niles; Michael Dobson	1988	

HHQ—Head to Head Quest modules for 2nd Edition AD&D are designed for one Player and a DM

Head to Head Quest - 2nd Ed. AD&D - Generic
Code	TSR#	Title	Levels	Author(s)	Published	Notes
HHQ1	9330	Fighter's Challenge	2–4	John Terra	1992	
HHQ2	9359	Wizard's Challenge	2–5	Tim Beach	1992	
HHQ3	9420	Thief's Challenge	2–4	Troy Christensen	1993	
HHQ4	9429	Cleric's Challenge	2–4	L. Richard Baker III	1993	
(HHQ5)	9427	Fighter's Challenge II	4–6	Drew Bittner	1994	
(HHQ6)	9454	Wizard's Challenge II	4–6	Kevin Melka	1994	
(HHQ7)	9478	Thief's Challenge II: Beacon Point	4–6	Terry Amthor	1995	
(HHQ8)	9483	Cleric's Challenge II	4–6	Paul Culotta	1995	

HW—Hollow World set in Mystara.

Hollow World - BECM D&D - Mystara
Code	TSR#	Title	Levels	Author(s)	Published	Notes
HWA1	9303	Nightwail	6–8	Allen Varney	1990	Blood Brethren trilogy
HWA2	9310	Nightrage	7–9	Allen Varney	1990	Blood Brethren trilogy
HWA3	9311	Nightstorm	8–10	Allen Varney	1991	Blood Brethren trilogy
HWQ1	9378	The Milenian Scepter	6–8	Anthony Herring	1992	
HWR1	9332	Sons of Azca		John Nephew	1991	Hollow World Accessory
HWR2	9339	Kingdom of Nithia		Blake Mobley, Newton Ewell	1991	Hollow World Accessory
HWR3	9384	The Milenian Empire		Anthony Herring	1992	Hollow World Accessory

=== I ===
I—Intermediate, for AD&D, mostly separate adventures though some sequels do exist within the series.

Intermediate - 1st Ed. AD&D - Various/Generic
Code	TSR#	Title	Levels	Author(s)	Published	Notes
I1	9046	Dwellers of the Forbidden City	4–7	David Cook	1981	Set in Greyhawk; Ranked 13th greatest adventure of all time
I2	9055	Tomb of the Lizard King	5–7	Mark Acres	1982	
I3	9052	Pharaoh	5–7	Tracy & Laura Hickman	1982	Desert of Desolation part 1. Originally published by Tracy & Laura Hickman in 1980.
I4	9053	Oasis of the White Palm	6–8	Philip Meyers; Tracy Hickman	1983	Desert of Desolation part 2
I5	9054	Lost Tomb of Martek	7–9	Tracy Hickman	1983	Desert of Desolation part 3
I3–5	9199	Desert of Desolation	5–10	Various	1987	Revised Compilation. Ranked 6th greatest adventure of all time
I6	9075	Ravenloft	5–7	Tracy & Laura Hickman	1983	Ranked 2nd greatest adventure of all time. First module set in Ravenloft.
I7	9152	Baltron's Beacon	4–8	Philip Meyers	1985	
I8	9169	Ravager of Time	8–10	Graeme Morris & Jim Bambra	1986	UK
I9	9178	Day of Al'Akbar	8–10	Allen Hammack	1986	
I10	9181	Ravenloft II: The House on Gryphon Hill	8–10	Tracy & Laura Hickman	1986	Sequel to I6. Official download
I11	9187	Needle	8–10	Frank Mentzer	1987	[Official download: text, cover, PC art, art part 1, art part 2
I12	9201	Egg of the Phoenix	5–9	Frank Mentzer and Jennell Jaquays	1987	Abbreviated compilation of R1–R4
I13	9202	Adventure Pack I		Deborah Christian (ed.)	1987	
I14	9226	Swords of the Iron Legion	1–15+	Skip Williams (ed.)	1988	Battlesystem required

IM—Immortal, for use with D&D Immortals Set. Set in Mystara.

Immortal - Immortals D&D - Mystara
Code	TSR#	Title	Levels	Author(s)	Published	Notes
IM1	9171	The Immortal Storm	Novice	Frank Mentzer	1986	
IM2	9189	The Wrath of Olympus	Temporal	Robert J. Blake	1987	
IM3	9207	The Best of Intentions	Temporal	Ken Rolston	1987	

=== L ===
L—Lendore Isles was Lenard Lakofka's campaign that was made part of Greyhawk. It was originally planned to be a series of five linked modules, but only three were ever published.

Lendore Isles - 1st Ed. AD&D - Greyhawk
Code	TSR#	Title	Levels	Author(s)	Published	Notes
L1	9045	The Secret of Bone Hill	2–4	Lenard Lakofka	1981	Official download: text, cover, maps, art
L2	9057	The Assassin's Knot	2–5	Lenard Lakofka	1983	Ranked 29th greatest adventure of all time
L3	9844	Deep Dwarven Delve	3–6	Lenard Lakofka	1999	Meant to be published in the 1980s but canceled, finally printed as part of TSR Silver Anniversary boxed set
L4		Devilspawn	3–5	Lenard Lakofka	2010	Official download
L4C		The Lendore Isle Companion	1-5	Lenard Lakofka	2010	Companion to running adventures in the Lendore Isles. Official download
L5A		The Kroten Campaign Guide		Lenard Lakofka	2014	Describes the area where L5 takes place. Official download
L5B		The Kroten Adventures		Lenard Lakofka	2014	Details five adventures in the Kroten area. Official download
L5C		The Kroten Campaign Companion		Lenard Lakofka	2014	Optional new material for the game: new rules, armor, cleric abilities, magic items, etc. Official download
L5[D]		Map Pack		Lenard Lakofka	2014	Maps for the city of Kroten and the surrounding area. Official download

LN(A/Q/R)—Lankhmar/Nehwon (Adventure/Quest/Reference) independent adventures for use with Lankhmar City of Adventure box set.

Lankhmar/Nehwon - 1st Ed. AD&D - Nehwon (Lankhmar)
Code	TSR#	Title	Levels	Author(s)	Published	Notes
LNA1	9276	Thieves of Lankhmar		Nigel Findley	1990	
LNA2	9305	Nehwon	7–12	Blake Mobley	1990	
LNA3	9318	Prince of Lankhmar	10–14	Dale "Slade" Henson	1991	
LNQ1	9371	Slayers of Lankhmar	8–11	Slade Henson	1992	
LNR1	9295	Wonders of Lankhmar		Dale "Slade" Henson	1990	Short Adventures
LNR2	9329	Tales of Lankhmar	3–10	Anthony Pryor	1991	Short Adventures includes sequel to CA2

=== M ===
M—Master for use with the Master Dungeons & Dragons rules, set in Mystara.

Master - Master D&D - Mystara
Code	TSR#	Title	Levels	Author(s)	Published	Notes
M1	9159	Into the Maelstrom	25–30	Bruce Heard, Beatrice Heard	1985	
M2	9148	Vengeance of Alphaks	28–32	Skip Williams	1986	Sequel to module M1
M3	9174	Twilight Calling	30–35	Tom Moldvay	1986	
M4	9204	Five Coins for a Kingdom	28–32	Allen Varney	1987	
M5	9214	Talons of Night	20–25	Jennell Jaquays	1987	Sequel to module M2

MSOLO: solo modules set in Mystara by default.

Mystara Solo - Basic/Expert D&D - Mystara
Code	TSR#	Title	Levels	Author(s)	Published	Notes
M1 (MSOLO1)	9067	Blizzard Pass	Thieves 1–3	David Cook	1983	solo, invisible ink, Basic Set, Reviewed
M2 (MSOLO2)	9060	Maze of the Riddling Minotaur	1–10	Jeff Grubb	1983	solo, invisible ink, Expert Set

MV—Magic Viewer: solo adventure for 1st Edition AD&D.

Magic Viewer - 1st Ed. AD&D - Generic
Code	TSR#	Title	Levels	Author(s)	Published	Notes
MV1	9104	Midnight on Dagger Alley	Intro	Merle M. Rasmussen	1984	solo

=== N ===
N—Novice

Novice - 1st Ed. AD&D - Various/Generic
Code	TSR#	Title	Levels	Author(s)	Published	Notes
N1	9063	Against the Cult of the Reptile God	1–3	Douglas Niles	1982	Set in Greyhawk; ranked 19th greatest adventure of all time
N2	9084	The Forest Oracle	2–4	Carl Smith	1984	
N3	9163	Destiny of Kings	1–4	Stephen Bourne	1986	Has a typo on the module booklet cover: it states that the adventure is for 5-10 characters levels 4-8, when in fact, the module is for 4-6 characters of levels 1-4. In 1998 the module was re-released for 2nd Edition AD&D.
N4	9185	Treasure Hunt	0–1	Aaron Allston	1986	FR module (retroactive)
N5	9212	Under Illefarn	0–3	Steve Perrin	1987	First labelled FR module

=== O ===
O—One on one (one player one master) set in Mystara.

One on One - Expert D&D - Mystara
Code	TSR#	Title	Levels	Author(s)	Published	Notes
O1	9050	The Gem and the Staff	Thief 8	John and Laurie Van De Graaf	1983	
O2	9108	Blade of Vengeance	Elf 7	Jim Bambra	1984	UK

OA—Oriental Adventures was originally its own campaign setting (see Oriental Adventures and List of Forgotten Realms modules and sourcebooks), but from OA5 was incorporated into Forgotten Realms.

Oriental Adventures - 1st Ed. AD&D / 2nd Ed. AD&D - Forgotten Realms (Toril)
Code	TSR#	Title	Levels	Author(s)	Published	Notes
OA1	9164	Swords of the Daimyo		David Cook	1986	Module also contained these adventures: "Over the Waves We Will Go" (6-9) "Riders of the Black Temple" (1) "Lord of the Black Temple" (3-5)
OA2	9186	Night of the Seven Swords		Various	1986	
OA3	9195	Ochimo: The Spirit Warrior	5–7	Jeff Grubb	1987	
OA4	9203	Blood of the Yakuza		David Cook	1987	
OA5	9242	Mad Monkey vs. the Dragon Claw	6–9	Jeff Grubb	1988	Official download
OA6	9257	Ronin Challenge	5–8	Curtis Smith; Rick Swan	1989	Official download
OA7	9258	Test of the Samurai	6–9	Rick Swan	1989	Sequel to OA6. Official download

OP—Outer Planes for use with the AD&D Manual of the Planes.

Outer Planes - 1st Ed. AD&D - Outer Planes
Code	TSR#	Title	Levels	Author(s)	Published	Notes
OP1	9225	Tales of the Outer Planes	various (1-11+)		1988	Short Adventures

=== Q ===
Q—Queen of the Demonweb Pits single module conclusion to the G and D series

Queen of the Demonweb Pits - 1st Ed. AD&D - Greyhawk (Oerth)
Code	TSR#	Title	Levels	Author(s)	Published	Notes
Q1	9035	Queen of the Demonweb Pits	10–14	David C. Sutherland III; Gary Gygax	1980	Is the conclusion of the GDQ Series.

=== R ===
R—Role Playing Game Association tournament modules, R1–6 were also available to RPGA members. R1–4 were later revised and abridged as I12. Mentzer initially intended the "R" series to take place in Greyhawk (on a different continent from Oerik) as part of an "Acquaria" or "Aqua-Oeridian" campaign. The original concept was to use these modules to form the basis of a new Greyhawk boxed set, although TSR never went forward with these plans and as such the modules are not officially for Greyhawk.

Role Playing Game Association - 1st Ed. AD&D - Generic
Code	TSR#	Title	Levels	Author(s)	Published	Notes
R1		To the Aid of Falx	5–9	Frank Mentzer	1982	
R2		The Investigation of Hydell	3–5	Frank Mentzer	1982	
R3		The Egg of the Phoenix	5–9	Frank Mentzer	1982	
R4		Doc's Island	6–10	Frank Mentzer	1983	
R5		Great Bugbear Hunt	5–7	Frank Mentzer	1986	Run at GenCon South in 1982, later published in Polyhedron #28
R6		Bigby's Tomb	5–7	Frank Mentzer	1984	Run at an unknown tournament in 1984, later published in Polyhedron #20 as "The 384th Incarnation of Bigby's Tomb"
R7		"Dwarven" Quest for the Rod of Seven Parts		Frank Mentzer	(1982)	Dwarven Quest for the Rod of Seven Parts Part 1. Run at GenCon II East in 1982, never published.
R8		Yog's Dessert		Frank Mentzer	(1982)	Dwarven Quest for the Rod of Seven Parts Part 2 (sometimes misspelled "Yog's Desert"). Run at GenCon II East in 1982, never published.
R9		Tinker's Canyon		Frank Mentzer	(1982)	Dwarven Quest for the Rod of Seven Parts Part 3. Run at GenCon II East in 1982, never published.
R10		Air Plane!		Frank Mentzer	(1982)	Dwarven Quest for the Rod of Seven Parts Part 4. Run at GenCon II East in 1982, never published. Took place on the Plane of Air, hence the name.

RA—Ravenloft / RQ—Ravenloft Quests TSR changed coding for sales purposes. Grand Conjunction Campaign was developed after the first 3 modules were made

Ravenloft/Ravenloft Quests - 2nd Ed. AD&D - Ravenloft
Code	TSR#	Title	Levels	Author(s)	Published	Notes
RA1	9298	Feast of Goblyns	4-7	Blake Mobley	1990	3rd Grand Conjunction Campaign Module or Stand alone
RA2	9321	Ship of Horror	8–10	Anne Brown	1991	4th Grand Conjunction Campaign Module or stand alone
RA3	9338	Touch of Death	3-5	Bruce Nesmith	1991	2nd Grand Conjunction Campaign Module or stand alone
RQ1	9352	Night of the Walking Dead	1-3	Bill Slavicsek	1992	1st Grand Conjunction Campaign Module or stand alone
RQ2	9364	Thoughts of Darkness	12-15	David Wise	1992	
RQ3	9375	From the Shadows	9-12	Bruce Nesmith	1992	5th Grand Conjunction Campaign Module (Can be played as a predecessor to RM1 Roots of Evil or as a stand alone)

RM—Ravenloft Missions TSR changed coding again for sales purposes

Ravenloft Missions - 2nd Ed. AD&D - Ravenloft
Code	TSR#	Title	Levels	Author(s)	Published	Notes
RM1	9413	Roots of Evil	9-12	Erik Haddock & David Wise	1993	6th and Final Module in the Grand Conjunction Campaign .
RM2	9414	The Created	2-4	Bruce Nesmith	1993	
RM3	9415	Web of Illusion	7-9	William W. Connors	1993	
RM4	9418	House of Strahd	6-13	Tracy and Laura Hickman	1993	

RPGA—Role Playing Game Association tournament modules, also available to RPGA members. This series was later revised and reprinted as B7, C4 & C5.

Role Playing Game Association - Basic D&D / 1st Ed. AD&D - Mystara / Generic
Code	TSR#	Title	Levels	Author(s)	Published	Notes
RPGA1		Rahasia	1–2	Tracy and Laura Hickman	1983	For Basic D&D; reprint of non-TSR module from 1979. Later combined into B7. Original RPGA1 by itself is a very rare module, though PDFs exist of RPGA1 and 2 combined and edited into a single document.
RPGA2		Black Opal Eye	2–3	Tracy and Laura Hickman	1983	For Basic D&D. Later combined into B7. Very rare module.
RPGA3		The Forgotten King	4–7	Bob Blake	1983	First part of C4 To Find a King Module
RPGA4		The Elixir of Life	4–7	Bob Blake	1983	Second and Final part of C4 To Find a King Module
RPGA5		Riddle of Dolmen Moor	4–7	Bob Blake		in Polyhedron #16, reprinted in C5 The Bane of Llywelyn
RPGA6		Incants of Ishcabeble	4–7	Bob Blake		in Polyhedron #17, reprinted in C5 The Bane of Llywelyn
RPGA7		Llywelyn's Tomb	4–7	Bob Blake		in Polyhedron #18, reprinted in C5 The Bane of Llywelyn
RPGA8		And the Gods Will Have Their Way	4–7	Bob Blake		in Polyhedron #19, reprinted in C5 The Bane of Llywelyn

RS—Red Sonja

Red Sonja - 1st Ed. AD&D - Earth (Hyborian Age)
Code	TSR#	Title	Levels	Author(s)	Published	Notes
RS1	9183	Red Sonja Unconquered	10–14	Anne McCready	1986	

=== S ===
S—Special

Special - 1st Ed. AD&D / 2nd Ed. AD&D - Greyhawk/Generic
Code	TSR#	Title	Levels	Author(s)	Published	Notes
S1	9022	Tomb of Horrors	10–14	Gary Gygax	1978	Module from Origins 1, set in Greyhawk. Ranked 3rd greatest adventure of all time. Official download of 3.5 conversion
S2	9027	White Plume Mountain	5–10	Lawrence Schick	1979	Set in Greyhawk. Ranked 9th greatest adventure of all time. Official download of 3.5 Ed. revision "Official download of Outside the Mountain web enhancement". Archived from the original on November 3, 2012.
S3	9033	Expedition to the Barrier Peaks	8–12	Gary Gygax	1980	Set in Greyhawk. Ranked 5th greatest adventure of all time.
S4	9061	The Lost Caverns of Tsojcanth	6–10	Gary Gygax	1982	Predecessor of WG4, set in Greyhawk. Originally published in 1976 without a module code as The Lost Caverns of Tsojconth (note difference in spelling). Ranked 22nd greatest adventure of all time
S1–4	9209	Realms of Horror	10-14	Gary Gygax	1987	Abridged Compilation
(S5)	9471	The Dancing Hut of Baba Yaga	7–20	Lisa Smedman	1995	2nd Edition
(S6)	9503	Labyrinth of Madness	15+	Monte Cook	1995	2nd Edition

SJA—Spelljammer Adventure set in the Spelljammer campaign setting

Spelljammer Adventure - 2nd Ed. AD&D - Spelljammer
Code	TSR#	Title	Levels	Author(s)	Published	Notes
SJA1	9273	Wildspace	6–8	Allen Varney	1990	An adventure that introduces the Spelljammer setting
SJA2	9286	Skull & Crossbows	6–10	Nigel Findley	1990	An anthology of adventures that can be used as a sequel to Wildspace
SJA3	9299	Crystal Spheres	5–7	J. Paul LaFountain	1990	Introduces four new crystal spheres
SJA4	9325	Under the Dark Fist	10–14	Grant Boucher	1991	Introduces twelve new crystal spheres

SJQ–Spelljammer Quest set in the Spelljammer campaign setting

Spelljammer Quest - 2nd Ed. AD&D - Spelljammer
Code	TSR#	Title	Levels	Author(s)	Published	Notes
SJQ1	9347	Heart of the Enemy	8–11	Rick Swam	1992	Set during the second Unhuman War and designed to follow Goblins' Return

SJS—Spelljammer Sourcebook set in the Spelljammer campaign setting

Spelljammer Sourcebook - 2nd Ed. AD&D - Spelljammer
Code	TSR#	Title	Levels	Author(s)	Published	Notes
SJS1	9343	Goblins' Return	7–10	Bruce Nesmith	1991	Set during the second Unhuman War and designed to work with Heart of the Enemy

ST–Steam Train (or Stoke-on-Trent) limited edition module released at 1986 Stoke-on-Trent Garden Festival (UK).

Steam Train - Basic/Expert D&D - Generic
Code	TSR#	Title	Levels	Author(s)	Published	Notes
ST1		Up the Garden Path	4–7	Graeme Morris; Mike Brunton	1986	

=== T ===
T—Temple of Elemental Evil set in Greyhawk. They can also form an extended campaign followed by A, G, and Q.

Temple of Elemental Evil - 1st Ed. AD&D - Greyhawk (Oerth)
Code	TSR#	Title	Levels	Author(s)	Published	Notes
T1	9026	The Village of Hommlet	1–3	Gary Gygax	1979	
T1–4	9147	The Temple of Elemental Evil	1–8	Gary Gygax; Frank Mentzer	1985	Includes abridged T1. Ranked 4th greatest adventure of all time

=== U ===
U—Underwater a linked trilogy set in Greyhawk, published in the UK.

Underwater - 1st Ed. AD&D - Greyhawk (Oerth)
Code	TSR#	Title	Levels	Author(s)	Published	Notes
U1	9062	The Sinister Secret of Saltmarsh	1–3	Dave Browne, Don Turnbull	1981	Ranked 27th greatest adventure of all time
U2	9064	Danger at Dunwater	1–4	Dave Browne, Don Turnbull	1982	
U3	9076	The Final Enemy	3–5	Dave Browne, Don Turnbull	1983	

UK—United Kingdom a series of mostly independent adventures developed by the TSR UK office

United Kingdom - 1st Ed. AD&D - Greyhawk (Oerth)/Generic
Code	TSR#	Title	Levels	Author(s)	Published	Notes
UK1	9066	Beyond the Crystal Cave	4–7	Dave Browne, Tom Kirby, Graeme Morris	1983	Set in Greyhawk
UK2	9101	The Sentinel	2–5	Graeme Morris	1983	Adlerweg Part 1, set in Greyhawk
UK3	9111	The Gauntlet	3–6	Graeme Morris	1984	Adlerweg Part 2, set in Greyhawk
UK4	9120	When a Star Falls	3–5	Graeme Morris	1984	
UK5	9125	Eye of the Serpent	1	Graeme Morris	1984	
UK6	9126	All That Glitters...	3–5	Jim Bambra	1984	
UK7	9151	Dark Clouds Gather	7–9	Jim Bambra, Phil Gallagher	1985	

=== W ===
WG—World of Greyhawk was a series of stand-alone adventures set in Greyhawk for 1st edition except as noted. No modules were ever assigned codes WG1–WG3. WG1 was earmarked for The Village of Hommlet (T1), and WG2 was earmarked for The Temple of Elemental Evil (T1-4). WG3 was to be Lost Caverns of Tsojcanth (S4), a loosely tied predecessor to WG4. WG7 was advertised during summer 1986 as Shadowlords, a collaboration between Gary Gygax and Skip Williams. Gygax's lawsuit with TSR put Shadowlords in limbo, and it was replaced with Castle Greyhawk.

World of Greyhawk - 1st Ed. AD&D/2nd Ed. AD&D - Greyhawk (Oerth)
Code	TSR#	Title	Levels	Author(s)	Published	Notes
WG4	9065	The Forgotten Temple of Tharizdun	8–10	Gary Gygax	1982	Sequel to S4. Ranked 23rd greatest adventure of all time
WG5	9112	Mordenkainen's Fantastic Adventure	9–12	Robert Kuntz, Gary Gygax	1984	
WG6	9153	Isle of the Ape	18 +	Gary Gygax	1985	
WG7	9222	Castle Greyhawk	0–25	Various	1988	Humorous theme
WG8	9253	Fate of Istus		Various	1989	Has 2nd edition logo
WG9	9251	Gargoyle	1–4	Dave Collins, Skip Williams	1989	2nd edition
WG10	9265	Child's Play	13–15	Jean Rabe, Skip Williams	1989	2nd edition
WG11	9269	Puppets	1–3	Vince Garcia, Bruce Rabe	1989	2nd edition
WG12	9270	Vale of the Mage	7–9	Jean Rabe	1989	2nd edition

WGA—World of Greyhawk Adventure

World of Greyhawk Adventure - 2nd Ed. AD&D - Greyhawk (Oerth)
Code	TSR#	Title	Levels	Author(s)	Published	Notes
WGA1	9279	Falcon's Revenge	5–7	Richard and Anne Brown	1990	fold-up cardstock buildings
WGA2	9289	Falconmaster	5–7	Richard and Anne Brown	1990	fold-up cardstock buildings
WGA3	9302	Flames of the Falcon	5–7	Richard and Anne Brown	1990	fold-up cardstock buildings
WGA4	9309	Vecna Lives!	12–15	David Cook	1990	

WGM—World of Greyhawk Mission

World of Greyhawk Mission - 2nd Ed. AD&D - Greyhawk (Oerth)
Code	TSR#	Title	Levels	Author(s)	Published	Notes
WGM1	9406	Border Watch	1–3	Paul Riegel	1993	

WGQ—World of Greyhawk Quest

World of Greyhawk Quest - 2nd Ed. AD&D - Greyhawk (Oerth)
Code	TSR#	Title	Levels	Author(s)	Published	Notes
WGQ1	9385	Patriots of Ulek	1–3	Anthony Pryor	1992	

WGR—World of Greyhawk Reference is a mix of adventures and background information.

World of Greyhawk Reference - 2nd Ed. AD&D - Greyhawk (Oerth)
Code	TSR#	Title	Levels	Author(s)	Published	Notes
WGR1	9292	Greyhawk Ruins	2–15	Blake Mobley, Timothy Brown	1990	
WGR2	9360	Treasures of Greyhawk	4–18	Various	1992	Short Adventures
WGR3	9386	Rary the Traitor	All / 8+	Anthony Pryor	1992	
WGR4	9398	The Marklands		Carl Sargent	1993	Sourcebook
WGR5	9399	Iuz the Evil		Carl Sargent	1993	Sourcebook
WGR6	9405	The City of Skulls	9–12	Carl Sargent	1993	Ranked 26th greatest adventure of all time

WGS—World of Greyhawk Swords was originally intended as a trilogy. The planned third module became instead the Greyhawk Wars boxed wargame.

World of Greyhawk Swords - 2nd Ed. AD&D - Greyhawk (Oerth)
Code	TSR#	Title	Levels	Author(s)	Published	Notes
WGS1	9317	Five Shall Be One	7–10	Carl Sargent	1991	
WGS2	9337	Howl From the North	8–10	Dale "Slade" Henson	1991	

=== X ===
X—eXpert series was for use with Dungeons & Dragons Expert Set except where noted and set in Mystara.

eXpert Series - Expert D&D - Mystara
Code	TSR#	Title	Levels	Author(s)	Published	Notes
X1	9043	The Isle of Dread	3–7	David Cook; Tom Moldvay	1981	Included in Expert Set. Ranked 16th greatest adventure of all time
X2	9051	Castle Amber	3–6	Tom Moldvay	1981	Ranked 15th greatest adventure of all time
X3	9056	Curse of Xanathon	5–7	Douglas Niles	1982	
X4	9068	Master of the Desert Nomads	6–9	David Cook	1983	Nomads Pt 1
X5	9069	Temple of Death	6–10	David Cook	1983	Nomads Pt 2. Given 10/10 by White Dwarf.
X6	9081	Quagmire!	4–10	Merle M. Rasmussen	1984	
X7	9079	The War Rafts of Kron	9–12	Bruce Nesmith	1984	
X8	9127	Drums on Fire Mountain	5–8	Graeme Morris; Tom Kirby	1984	UK made
X9	9129	The Savage Coast	4–10	Merle M. Rasmussen; Jackie Rasmussen; Anne C. Gray	1985	
X10	9160	Red Arrow, Black Shield	10–14	Michael S. Dobson	1985	Battlesystem required; uses elements introduced in X4-X5, but not a continuation of that series as such
X11	9165	Saga of the Shadow Lord	5–9	Stephen Bourne	1986	
X12	9188	Skarda's Mirror	5–8	Aaron Allston	1987	
X13	9218	Crown of Ancient Glory	7–10	Stephen Bourne	1987	Requires Companion Set
XL1	9114	Quest for the Heartstone	5–10	Michael L. Gray	1984	Tie in to action figures. Given 4/10 by White Dwarf.
XSOLO	9082	Lathan's Gold	4–6	Merle M. Rasmussen	1984	Solo Module
XS2	9157	Thunderdelve Mountain	7–9	William Carlson	1985	Solo Module

== Other modules ==
Code	Title	Levels	Author(s)	Published	Notes
9481	Avengers in Lankhmar	1-3		1991	The players, and three competitor teams of non-player characters, search Lankhmar for the fugitive assassin.
	Adventurer's Guild modules				Limited edition modules released by TSR to retailers as promotional tie-ins to upcoming products.
11413	Against the Giants: The Liberation of Geoff	Variable	Gary Gygax and Sean K. Reynolds	1999	Expanded version of G1, G2 and G3 that includes adventures suitable for low to high level characters. Set in Greyhawk.
11614	The Apocalypse Stone	15+	Jason Carl & Chris Pramas	2000	An endtimes adventure designed to bring about the destruction of the campaign world. Generic setting.
9350	Assault on Raven's Ruin	2–3	Tim Beach	1992	Thunder Rift setting.
11347	Axe of the Dwarvish Lords	13–15	Skip Williams	1999	Generic setting.
9580	Crypt of Lyzandred the Mad	8–10 or 8–12	Sean K. Reynolds	1998	Second volume in the Lost Tombs trilogy. Set in Greyhawk.
9471	The Dancing Hut of Baba Yaga	7–20	Lisa Smedman	1995	Generic setting.
2019S	Dark and Hidden Ways	Varies	Various	1990	Bundled with the Dungeoneer's Survival Guide; disconnected Underdark encounters.
2631	Dead Gods	6-9	Monte Cook	1997	For the Planescape setting. Ranked 14th greatest adventure of all time.
11377	Destiny of Kings	1–4	Stephen Bourne	1998	2nd edition version of the original module published in 1986.
11662	Die Vecna Die!	10–13	Bruce R. Cordell and Steve Miller	2000	Three-part adventure (Greyhawk, Ravenloft and Planescape). The final 2nd edition adventure.
9581	The Doomgrinder	4–8	Steve Miller	1998	Final adventure in the Lost Tombs trilogy. Set in Greyhawk.
	Dragon Mountain	10-15		1993	Boxed set adventure.
11444	Dungeons of Despair	Varies	Various	1999	Adventures compiled from Dungeon magazine.
	The Dwarven Glory		Pete and Judy Kerestan	1977	Distributed by TSR and published by Wee Warriors.
9542	Evil Tide	5–7	Bruce Cordell	1997	First part of the "Sahuagin" trilogy and supports the Sea Devils sourcebook of the Monstrous Arcana series. Generic setting.
9530	Eye of Doom	6–8	Thomas M. Reid	1996	Second part of the "Beholder" trilogy.
9522	Eye of Pain	4–8	Thomas M. Reid	1996	First part of the "Beholder" trilogy and supports the I, Tyrant sourcebook of the Monstrous Arcana series. Generic setting.
11373	Eye of the Wyvern		Jeff Grubb	1999	Fast-Play Game adventure.
9536	Eye to Eye	8–12	Thomas M. Reid	1996	Third part of the "Beholder" trilogy.
2430	Forest Maker	11–13	John J. Terra	1994	For the Dark Sun setting.
9533	The Gates of Firestorm Peak	5-8	Bruce Cordell	1996	Ranked 11th greatest adventure of all time. Incorporates rules from the Player's Option books. Generic setting.
2502	Hail the Heroes	1–3	Tim Beach	1994	Set in Mystara. Includes an interactive audio CD for use with the adventure.
9534	A Hero's Tale	1-10	Monte Cook	1996	Adventure anthology suitable for any campaign world.
9436	In the Phantom's Wake	3–5	"Slade" Henson	1993	Thunder Rift setting.
9259	The Jade Hare	1	John Nephew	1992	Limited edition module included for free with other purchases from the TSR Mail Order Hobby Shop in order to secure the trademark for its "Dragon Master" line of products. Designed for first level characters.
3142	King of the Giantdowns	Variable	Ed Stark	1997	For the Birthright campaign setting. Includes adventures for low to high level characters.
9434	The Knight of Newts	1-2	"Slade" Henson	1993	Thunder Rift setting. Designed for the boxed set or Rules Cyclopedia and comes with full color poster map.
9503	Labyrinth of Madness	15+	Monte Cook	1995	Generic setting.
3125	Legends of the Hero-Kings	Variable	Ed Stark	1996	For the Birthright campaign setting. Includes adventures for low to high level characters.
9573	The Lost Shrine of Bundushatur	8-10	Michael D. Wagner	1998	Generic setting. Part of the Dungeon Crawl series of stand-alone modules.
2513	Mark of Amber	4–6	Aaron Allston, Jeff Grubb and John D. Rateliff	1995	Set in Mystara; sequel to Castle Amber. Includes interactive audio CD for use with the adventure.
9568	Moonlight Madness	4–6	Penny & Skip Williams	1998	Generic setting.
1125	Night Below	1-10+	Carl Sargent	1995	Generic setting. Epic Underdark Campaign.
9550	Night of the Shark	6–8	Bruce Cordell	1997	Second part of the "Sahuagin" trilogy.
2509	Night of the Vampire	1–3	L. Richard Baker III	1994	Set in Mystara.
	Palace of the Vampire Queen		Pete and Judy Kerestan	1976	The first published adventure ever. Distributed by TSR and published by Wee Warriors.
9586	A Paladin in Hell	15–20	Monte Cook	1998	Generic setting.
9342	Quest for the Silver Sword	2–3	William W. Connors	1992	Thunder Rift setting. Followed by Rage of the Rakasta.
	Quest for the Fazzlewood		John and Laurie Van De Graaf	1978	Tournament module later revised and published as The Gem and the Staff.
9435	Rage of the Rakasta	2–4	William W. Connors	1993	Thunder Rift setting. Can be played as a sequel to Quest for the Silver Sword or as a stand-alone.
11397	Ravenloft: 25th Anniversary	5–7	Tracy and Laura Hickman	1999	2nd edition version of the original module. Set in Ravenloft. Also known as the Silver Anniversary Edition, not to be confused with the I6 Ravenloft facsimile which was included in the TSR Silver Anniversary box.
9576	Return of the Eight	6–12	Roger E. Moore	1998	Set in Greyhawk.
11327	Return to the Keep on the Borderlands	1–3	John D. Rateliff	1999	Sequel to B2 The Keep on the Borderlands. Set in Greyhawk (but also has several Mystara references), even though B2 was generic in terms of setting.
1162	Return to the Tomb of Horrors	13–16	Bruce R. Cordell	1998	Expansion and sequel to S1 Tomb of Horrors. Set in Greyhawk. Ranked 10th greatest adventure of all time.
11434	Return to White Plume Mountain	7–10	Bruce R. Cordell	1999	Sequel to S2 White Plume Mountain. Set in Greyhawk.
11392	Reverse Dungeon	Various	John D. Rateliff & Bruce R. Cordell	2000	Players roleplay monsters defending a dungeon against NPC adventurers. Generic setting.
11376	Road to Danger	1–3	Christopher Perkins	1998	Low level adventures compiled from Dungeon magazine.
9560	Sea of Blood	7–9	Bruce R. Cordell	1997	Third part of the "Sahuagin" trilogy.
11621	Slavers	4–5	Sean K. Reynolds and Chris Pramas	2000	Sequel to A1–4 Scourge of the Slave Lords. Set in Greyhawk.
3102	Sword and Crown	5–7	Colin McComb	1995	For the Birthright campaign setting.
9387	Sword and Shield	1–3	John Terra	1992	Thunder Rift setting. Introductory adventure
9448	Temple, Tower, and Tomb	7-12	Steve Winter and Laura Craig	1994	
NN	Terrible Trouble at Tragidore	5–8	Bruce Rabe and Jean Rabe	1989	Generic Setting. Included with the 2nd edition Dungeon Master's Screen.
1145	The Rod of Seven Parts	10–12	Skip Williams	1996	Generic setting.
11325	The Shattered Circle	1–3	Bruce R. Cordell	1999	Generic setting.
9508	The Silver Key	2–8	Ted James Thomas Zuvich	1996	Generic setting.
9579	The Star Cairns	5–8	Sean K. Reynolds	1998	First part of the Lost Tombs trilogy. Set in Greyhawk.
	The Star of Kolhapur	5–8	Michael Selinker	1997	RPGA module. Generic setting.
3118	The Sword of Roele	5–8	Wolfgang Baur	1996	For the Birthright campaign setting.
9357	Thunder Rift	Entry Level	Colin McComb	1992	Presents the Thunder Rift campaign setting.
9518	Treasure Tales		Loren Coleman	1996	Adventure anthology.
11445	TSR Jam 1999	Various	Various	1999	Anthology of adventures compiled from the Adventurer's Guild program.
9582	Vecna Reborn	5-7	Monte Cook	1998	Marketed as a Ravenloft product as it was set in the Demiplane of Dread
11326	The Vortex of Madness		Chris Pramas	2000	
B00778	Wand of Archeal	6–8	Mike Selinker & Penny Williams	1999	Originally a Role Playing Game Association tournament module. Generic setting.
3110	Warlock of the Stonecrowns	4–10	Wolfgang Baur	1995	For the Birthright campaign setting
2020S	Wild Things		Grant Boucher	1997	Originally bundled with the Wilderness Survival Guide, this rare module was never sold separately. It has no cover but the sleeve originally containing the whole bundle; Wilderness adventure.
11331	Wrath of the Minotaur		Jeff Grubb	1999	Fast-Play Game adventure.
9570	A Darkness Gathering	7-9	Bruce R. Cordell	1998	First part of "The Illithiad" trilogy and supports "The Illithid" accessory.
9571	Masters of Eternal Night	7-9	Bruce R. Cordell	1998	Second part of "The Illithiad" trilogy and supports "The Illithid" accessory.
9572	Dawn of the Overmind	8-19	Bruce R. Cordell	1998	Third part of "The Illithiad" trilogy and supports "The Illithid" accessory.

== See also ==
- List of systemless fantasy role-playing game supplements
