= CA module series =

Series of Dungeons & Dragons role-playing game adventures

Swords of the Undercity Swords of Deceit
- Code: CA1–CA2
- Rules required: Advanced Dungeons & Dragons, first edition
- Character levels: 8–12 (CA1), 10–15 (CA2)
- Authors: Carl Smith, Bruce Nesmith, Douglas Niles (CA1); Stephen Bourne, Ken Rolston, Steve Mecca, Michael Dobson (CA2)
- First published: 1985–1986

The CA module series is a series of two adventures for the Dungeons & Dragons role-playing game, designed to be compatible with the Advanced Dungeons & Dragons first edition. Swords of the Undercity (CA1) was written for character levels 8–12 by Carl Smith, Bruce Nesmith, Douglas Niles and published in 1985. Swords of Deceit (CA2) was written for character levels 10–15 by Stephen Bourne, Ken Rolston, Steve Mecca, and Michael Dobson and published in 1986.

== See also ==
- List of Dungeons & Dragons modules
