= John and Laura Lakey =

Team of artists

John and Laura Lakey are artists whose work have appeared in role-playing games.

== Biography ==
John and Laura Lakey are a husband and wife team of illustrators. While each of them has produced solo artwork, they more commonly work together. Between the two of them, they have produced hundreds of published illustrations for role-playing games, science fiction publications, fantasy books and magazines, kids' books, and comic publishers. From the mid-eighties to the mid-nineties, John was also the creative director for the company, Original Appalachian Artworks, that produced the Cabbage Patch Kids. Later, he was the pre-production designer for Fox Feature Animation on such movies as Titan A.E. and Anastasia. They have three grown children.

== Works ==
John and Laura Lakey have produced interior illustrations for many Dungeons & Dragons books and associated novels since 1987, as well as cover art for Five Coins for a Kingdom (1987), Queen's Harvest (1989), Child's Play (1989), The Sea People (1990), Patriots of Ulek (1992), Fighter's Challenge (1992), Volo's Guide to the North (1993), The Murky Deep (1993), The Dalelands (1993), Hour of the Knife (1994), and Volo's Guide to Cormyr (1995). They have also produced artwork for other games including Hero System (Hero Games), Vampire: The Masquerade (White Wolf), and the live-action role-playing game Mind's Eye Theatre (White Wolf).
