= Dungeons & Dragons Adventure Game =

Tabletop role-playing game supplement

- 1999 AD&D second edition version
- Genre: Role-playing games
- Publisher: TSR
- Publication date: 1999, 2000

The Dungeons & Dragons Adventure Game is the name of two companion accessories to the second and third editions of the Dungeons & Dragons fantasy role-playing game. Designed as simpler, stand-alone versions of Dungeons & Dragons, they feature a simplified ruleset, but with character progression that parallels the standard game. However, for 3rd-level characters and higher, the standard Player's Handbook is still required. The first version was published in 1999 for the second edition of Advanced Dungeons & Dragons, while the second version was published in 2000 for the third edition of Dungeons & Dragons.

== Advanced Dungeons & Dragons 2nd edition ==
This version is intended as an introduction to Advanced Dungeons & Dragons with streamlined rules. The boxed set contains six dice, a dice bag, a gamemaster's screen, a rulebook, a book of pregenerated characters, and a book of adventures.

This version of Dungeons & Dragons Adventure Game was written by Bill Slavicsek.

It was reviewed by the online version of Pyramid on May 21, 1999.The reviewer commented that this was both a cheaper and "lite" version of the rules, and that with TSR's recent efforts, like Wrath of the Minotaur and Eye of the Wyvern, this boxed set "continues to show how things should be done". The reviewer also commented that in most cases, "the rules are enough to get the game started", but found one confusing area involving a reference stating that a character dies when the character's wounds exceed his or her hit point total, but another area says that the optional -10 hit point rule from AD&D standard is enforced.

== Dungeons & Dragons 3rd edition ==
The Dungeons & Dragons Adventure Game for the third edition of Dungeons & Dragons is a boxed set containing a 32-page Rule Book, a 48-page Adventure Book, 32 reference pages, a map, two pages of counters, a set of six dice, and a sheet titled "Read This First".

This version of Dungeons & Dragons Adventure Game was designed by Jonathan Tweet, Jason Carl, Andy Collins and David Noonan. It was published in August 2000.

The Dungeons & Dragons Adventure Game was reviewed by the online version of Pyramid on August 18, 2000. The reviewer commented that the Dungeons & Dragons Adventure Game "isn't a game that inspires me to heights of giddy delight, or sparks a raging inferno within me. No, it just is." The reviewer added: "The game itself is high quality. The character sheets are full color (though you'll need to cut the double-page spreads apart yourself); the counters are in color and double-sided (though not made of the sturdiest stock); and the dice, while not the ultra-snazzy glitter/marble/speckled sorts, are a grand evolution from the dice made of Pez with crayon kits included with the early "Basic" sets. The booklets, while black and white, are well-formatted and easy to read."
