= Dragon's Keep =

Dragon's Keep may refer to:

- Dragon's Keep, fantasy environment from the video game Full Tilt! Pinball
- Dragon's Keep, novel by Janet Lee Carey
- Dragon's Keep (1984), a Sierra Entertainment video game

== See also ==
- Dragon Keep, an adventure module for the Dungeons & Dragons role-playing game
