= Wizard's Challenge II =

Dungeons & Dragons adventure module

- Authors: Kevin Melka

Wizard's Challenge II is a 1994 adventure module by Kevin Melka for the 2nd edition of the Advanced Dungeons & Dragons fantasy role-playing game. It is a sequel to 1992's Wizard's Challenge by Tim Beach.

== Plot summary ==
In Wizard's Challenge II, Baron Tigus Felmoor, regent of the frontier town of New Haven, summons a freelance mage to investigate "a ghastly creature that breathed fire ... whose hide was so tough that swords shattered when they struck it."

== Publication history ==
Wizard's Challenge II was published by TSR, Inc. as part of the One-On-One volumes, a series of single-player adventures, which also includes Fighter's Challenge by John Terra and Cleric's Challenge by L. Richard Baker III.

== Reception ==
Rick Swan reviewed Wizard's Challenge II for Dragon magazine #215 (March 1995). He called Wizard's Challenge II "a breezy, undemanding AD&D game adventure for a Dungeon Master and a single PC". He notes that because the adventure is playable in a single session, "it's good practice for novices and a pleasant diversion for veterans". Swan felt that the One-On-One series, which also includes "the equally appealing" Fighter's Challenge and Cleric's Challenge "seems like a natural to me; I'm surprised other publishers haven't jumped on the bandwagon."
