= Sword and shield =

Sword and shield may refer to:

- Sword and Shield, a Dungeons & Dragons adventure module
- Sword and Shield (film), a 1926 German silent film
- Sword and shield theory, a pseudohistorical view of World War II France
- The Shield and the Sword, a song by Clare Maguire
- The Shield and the Sword (film), a 1968 Soviet spy series
- Pokémon Sword and Shield, 2019 games in the Pokémon video game series
- Order of the Sword & Shield, an American honor society for college students in security disciplines
- The Sword and the Shield, a book about the Mitrokhin Archive
- Shield and Sword of the Party (German: Schild und Schwert der Partei), motto of the Stasi

== See also ==
- Sword (disambiguation)
- Shield (disambiguation)
