= The Sea People =

Tabletop role-playing game supplement for Dungeons & Dragons

- Author: Jim Bambra
- Genre: Role-playing game
- Publisher: TSR
- Publication date: 1990

The Sea People is an accessory for the Dungeons & Dragons fantasy role-playing game.

== Contents ==
The Sea People is a supplement and campaign setting that details the underwater realm at the bottom of the Sea of Dread and its inhabitants.

== Publication history ==
PC3 The Sea People was written by Jim Bambra, with a cover by Lakey, and was published by TSR in 1990 as two 48-page booklets and an outer folder.

== Reception ==
In the June 1990 edition of Games International, the reviewer thought this supplement "reflects the looser approach of D&D over AD&D", and noted the "friendly fictional style."
