= The Jade Hare =

Dungeons & Dragons adventure module

- Code: 9259
- Rules required: D&D Basic
- Authors: John Nephew
- First published: 1992

The Jade Hare is a module for the Dungeons & Dragons Basic Set by John Nephew. It is eight pages, with many illustrations, much shorter than most modules of the same era. It was only available as a "give-away" module (included with purchases for free) from the TSR Mail Order Hobby Shop in 1992.

It was produced in only one printing, and was produced in small quantities. The vast majority of these modules came without a cover, a cardstock cover for the module was produced, but few copies have it. It features Larry Elmore artwork against a white background, and identifies the TSR stock # (9259). This artwork was originally used as the cover for the "Dungeon of Dread" Endless Quest gamebook, also released by TSR. In addition to the D&D logo and the title, it bears the subtitle "A Dragon Master Game Adventure." The subtitle was TSR's attempt to secure the "Dragon Master" trademark that the company had recently applied for (part of their plan to head off copycat titles with "Dragon" in the title, therefore "DragonStrike," "DragonQuest", etc.). The back cover is mostly blank, with only the TSR address, legal info, and price ($3.95) at the bottom. The cover is loose (not stapled with the module), and the interior is blank.
