= Wonders of Lankhmar =

Role-playing game guide

- Code: LNR1
- TSR product code: 9295
- Authors: Dale "Slade" Henson
- First published: 1990

Wonders of Lankhmar is an adventure module published in 1990 for the Advanced Dungeons & Dragons fantasy role-playing game.

== Plot summary ==
Wonders of Lankhmar contains forty-eight short adventure scenarios set Nehwon, and a map of Nehwon.

== Publication history ==
LNR1 Wonders of Lankhmar was written by Dale "Slade" Henson, with a cover by Fred Fields, and interior illustrations by Ken and Charles Frank and Jeff Easley, and was published by TSR in 1990 as a 96-page book.

== Reception ==
Lawrence Schick, in his 1991 book Heroic Worlds, comments on Wonders of Lankhmar: "There are a few good ideas here, but most of the entries are nothing special, and at two pages each they're all pretty short on detail."
