= The Dalelands =

Dungeons & Dragons companion book

- Author: L. Richard Baker III
- Language: English
- Published: 1993

The Dalelands (product code FRS1) is an accessory for the Dungeons & Dragons campaign setting Forgotten Realms that describes the Dalelands of Faerûn.

== Contents ==
This is a 64-page booklet wrapped in a removable cover. Included with the book is a fold-out color poster map of the Dalelands. The book focuses on the region known as "The Dalelands", including Archendale, Battledale, Daggerdale, Deepingdale, Featherdale, Harrowdale, The High Dale, Mistledale, Scardale, Shadowdale, Sessrendale, Tarkhaldale (the Lost Dale), Tasseldale, and Teshendale. The book also describes various features of the Dalelands as a whole, and gives some advice for campaigning in the Dales.

== Publication history ==
The book was written by Richard Baker, and released in 1993. Cover art is by John and Laura Lakey, with interior illustrations by Eric Hotz, Valerie Valusek, and Denis Beauvais, and cartography by Dawn Murin.
