= Eye of Doom =

Dungeons & Dragons adventure module

- Genre: Role-playing games
- Publisher: TSR
- Publication date: 1996

Eye of Doom is an adventure module for the 2nd edition of the Advanced Dungeons & Dragons fantasy role-playing game, published by TSR in 1996.

== Plot summary ==
Eye of Doom is an adventure in which the player characters go to the village of Cumbert (which lies above an underground area housing a hive of beholders). The characters are soon attacked by members of a cult called the Unblinking Eye, humans who choose to serve the beholders that live beneath their village. The characters must then infiltrate the cult to progress to the next part of the adventure.

== Publication history ==
In 1996, TSR published Eye of Pain, the first part of a trilogy designed by Thomas Reid that featured the giant floating eye known in AD&D as the beholder. The second part, Eye of Doom, was published the same year, a 32-page softcover book with artwork by Dana Andrews, Stephen A. Daniele, Greg Kerkman, Robert Lazzaretti, and Arnie Swekel.

Reid's final installment of the trilogy, Eye to Eye, was also published in 1996.

== Reception ==
In Issue 13 of Arcane, Paul Pettengale recalled that the prequel to this adventure, Eye of Pain, was "less than impressive" and then opined that Eye of Doom was no better. He called the central plot device that forces the player characters to infiltrate the Unblinking Eye cult "somewhat improbable, given that members of the group know who they are (having recently ambushed them and all)." Pettengale also did not like the final scene, which is a cliffhanger for the next installment of the adventure. He concluded by giving Eye of Doom a very poor rating of only 3 out of 10, saying, "Unfortunately, this series, thus far, has been a waste of a great foe - the beholder is a unique monster in AD&D, and one that deserves far, far better than this."
