= Realmspace =

Role-playing game supplement

- Author: Dale "Slade" Henson
- Genre: Role-playing game
- Publication date: 1991

Realmspace (product code SJR2) is an accessory for the Spelljammer campaign setting for the Dungeons & Dragons fantasy role-playing game by Dale Henson.

== Contents ==
This 96-page booklet describes the area of space near the planet Toril of the Forgotten Realms setting. The book describes the sun, as well as the planets Anadia, Coliar, Toril, Karpri, Chandos, Glyth, Garden, H'Catha, as well as Elminster's Hideout. The book also details new magical items, new monsters, and new spelljamming ships.

== Publication history ==
The book was written by Dale "Slade" Henson, and was published in 1991. Cover art is by Thomas Baxa, with interior illustrations by Newton Ewell.
