= The Wrath of Olympus =

Dungeons & Dragons adventure module

- Code: IM2
- TSR product code: 9189
- Authors: Robert J. Blake
- First published: 1987

The Wrath of Olympus is an adventure module published in 1987 for the Dungeons & Dragons fantasy role-playing game.

== Plot summary ==
The Wrath of Olympus is an adventure scenario using the Dungeons & Dragons Immortals Set, in which the player characters save Immortals held captive by the demons of entropy.

== Publication history ==
IM2 The Wrath of Olympus was written by Robert J. Blake, with a cover by Keith Parkinson and interior illustrations by George Barr, and was published by TSR in 1987 as a 48-page booklet with an outer folder.

== Reception ==
In his review for the Immortals Rules set in Dragon magazine #127 (November 1987), Ken Rolston mentions Bob Blake's Wrath of Olympus as "The best example of how Immortals could fit into a campaign", noting that the module "doesn't make the role of Immortals as gods much clearer, but does show how the rules can be used to produce a pretty interesting megalevel adventure".
