= The Magic Encyclopedia =

Tabletop role-playing game supplement

- Author: Connie and Dale Henson
- Genre: Role-playing games
- Publisher: TSR

The Magic Encyclopedia is an accessory for the Dungeons & Dragons fantasy role-playing game, published in 1992. It comprises Volume One and Volume Two. It was compiled for Advanced Dungeons & Dragons, 2nd edition.

== Contents ==
The Magic Encyclopedia is a two-volume product, an index of virtually every magical item from virtually every TSR rulebook, accessory, and magazine, listing roughly 5,500 magic items spread out over the two volumes in the series. The time period encompasses 1974 to 1991. The book alphabetizes the items into general categories, listing their experience point values, costs, and original appearances; also included is a complete list of TSR's role-playing products published from 1974 up to that time.

Volume One contains items from A–G. Volume Two contains items from H–Z.

== Publication history ==
Both volumes were published by TSR, Inc. and written by Connie Rae Henson and Dale "Slade" Henson.

== Reception ==
Rick Swan reviewed Magic Encyclopedia, Volume One for Dragon magazine #190 (February 1993). Swan considered The Magic Encyclopedia "a product that's long overdue", calling it "quite a collection". He considered that the complete list of TSR's role-playing products "may be worth the price of admission to hardcore collectors". However, he noted that "Since no descriptions are provided for individual items, the Magic Encyclopedia is less useful to new players than to old-timers who have access to a sizeable TSR library. Only the marketing department knows why it was necessary to publish this in two volumes", concluding that players would be unlikely to just want the items from one part of the alphabet.

Alan Mixon reviewed Volume One in a 1993 issue of White Wolf. He noted its comprehensiveness in listing all magic items in D&D, but stated a drawback as the lack of details for each magic item. He rated it overall at 3 points out of 5. John Setzer reviewed Volume Two in a 1994 issue of White Wolf. He rated it at 1 out of 5 points for Complexity, 2 points for Concepts and Value, and 3 points for Appearance and Playability. He gave it an overall rating of 2.5 out of 5 points.

== Reviews ==
- Australian Realms #12
