= Under Illefarn =

Dungeons & Dragons adventure module

- Code: N5
- TSR product code: 9212
- Rules required: 1st Ed AD&D
- Character levels: 0 - 3
- Campaign setting: Forgotten Realms
- Authors: Steve Perrin
- First published: 1987

Linked modules
- N1, N2, N3, N4, N5

Under Illefarn is a Dungeons & Dragons module. It was the first module designed for use with the Forgotten Realms campaign setting and officially labeled as such.

== Plot summary ==
Under Illefarn is a Forgotten Realms adventure scenario designed for beginning players in which the player characters are residents of Daggerford, and as members of the town militia and required to deal with lizardmen marauders, saving a kidnapped noblewoman, and protecting a caravan.

== Publication history ==
N5 Under Illefarn was written by Steve Perrin, with a cover by Jeff Easley and interior illustrations by Luise Perenne, and was published by TSR in 1987 as a 48-page booklet with an outer folder.
