= The Best of Intentions =

D&D module

- Code: IM3
- TSR product code: 9207
- Authors: Ken Rolston
- First published: 1987

The Best of Intentions is an adventure module published in 1987 for the Dungeons & Dragons fantasy role-playing game.

== Plot summary ==
The Best of Intentions is a comically written adventure scenario for the Dungeons & Dragons Immortals Set, in which the player characters search for the missing immortal Mazikeen.

The player characters are rookie Immortals trying to solve a mystery of cosmic proportions. The characters compete in the Olympic Trials, journey to the weird and multifarious planes of Mazikeen, and deal with other strange events.

== Publication history ==
IM3 The Best of Intentions was written by Ken Rolston, with a cover by Jeff Easley and interior illustrations by Jim Holloway, and was published by TSR in 1987 as a 48-page booklet with a large map and two outer folders.

== Reception ==
Jim Bambra briefly reviewed The Best of Intentions for Dragon magazine #131 (March 1988). Bambra praised the module, saying "Colorful pregenerated characters, excellent staging, nice cut-up bits, inserts, and amusing Jim Holloway illustrations make this a real treat for would-be gods. The Best of Intentions is a fun romp through the mystical realms of the D&D game's Immortals Set. Miss this one it at your own peril."
