= Swords of Deceit =

Dungeons & Dragons adventure module

- Code: CA2
- TSR product code: 9170
- Rules required: Advanced Dungeons and Dragons, 1st ED
- Character levels: 10 - 15
- Campaign setting: CA
- Authors: Stephen Bourne, Ken Rolston, Steve Mecca, Michael Dobson
- First published: 1986

Linked modules
- CA1, CA2

Swords of Deceit is a 1986 adventure module for the Advanced Dungeons & Dragons fantasy role-playing game, for the Lankhmar setting.

== Plot summary ==
Swords of Deceit contains three magazine-sized scenarios for the Lankhmar setting, the first of which is called "The Curse of Valinor". In this scenario, the player characters become involved in intrigue between the nobles of Lankhmar. The second scenario, "Return of the Rats", is a continuation of The Swords of Lankhmar, in which the characters must find the missing Fafhrd and the Gray Mouser. The player characters become shrunk and enter the Rat Kingdom of the Undercity to find Fafhrd and the Gray Mouser. The third scenario, "One Night in Lankhmar", begins in a gambling den. In this scenario the player characters must deal with gamblers, assassins, and illusions.

This 10th to 15th level adventure is designed for the LANKHMAR City of Adventure setting and the Advanced Dungeons & Dragons game. It cannot be played without the Lankhmar City of Adventure book or the AD&D rules published by TSR, Inc.

== Publication history ==
Swords of Deceit was designed by Stephen Bourne, Michael Dobson, Steve Mecca, and Ken Rolston, with cover art by Keith Parkinson, and was published by TSR in 1986 as a 40-page booklet with a color map and an outer folder. According to the module cover, it is intended for 4-5 player characters of levels 10-15.

CA2 is the second module published intended to be used with the campaign pack Lankhmar - City of Adventure. This module contains a 40-page scenario booklet, five pre-generated characters, and a full-color map of the city (including its main sewers).

== Reception ==
Graeme Davis reviewed Swords of Deceit for White Dwarf #82. Davis felt that the suggested levels for PCs were too high, and should have been more like 7-10; he suspected that this was done "so that Fafhrd and the Grey Mouser could be used", and had "a sneaking suspicion that American produced modules are written with a few levels of slack in them, so that it's possible to take the Rambo approach".

Of the scenarios, Davis called "The Curse of Valinor" a "strong tale about skeletons in the closet coming home to roost, with a mini-dungeon which is slightly hackneyed and a bit too helpful", pointing out that the monster's tomb contains a book which explains the whole story. He found "Return of the Rats" excellent with good role-playing opportunities and nice NPC characterization, although he found the sewer system in the scenario disappointing and illogical. Davis' favorite was "One Night in Lankhmar", stating that "No matter where your players have been or what they've done, they will never, ever forget this one. They'll probably never work out what's going on, either The whole thing is beautifully set up to leave them with the uneasy feeling that they've just clipped the edge of something really big."

Davis declared Swords of Deceit to be very good, "for an experienced DM with a group who are used to demanding and thoughtful adventures with the accent on role-playing".

== See also ==
- List of Dungeons & Dragons modules
