= The Gem and the Staff =

Dungeons & Dragons adventure module

- Code: O1
- TSR product code: 9050
- Rules required: D&D Expert Set
- Character levels: An 8th level Thief
- Campaign setting: Generic
- Authors: John and Laurie Van De Graaf
- First published: 1984

Linked modules
- O1, O2

The Gem and the Staff, by John and Laurie Van De Graaf, is an adventure module for the Dungeons & Dragons Expert Set. Rather than being a typical group adventure, The Gem and the Staff was designed for head-to-head tournament-style play, with players separately playing the same adventure and competing against each other for points earned by accomplishing certain goals. The adventure is only playable with one dungeon master (DM) and one player.

== Plot summary ==
The Gem and the Staff is an adventure for a DM and a single player using a provided thief character. The player must search for a magic gem and a staff of power inside the tower of an evil wizard.

This module is divided into two separate adventures, which can be played as successive scenarios. The player takes the role of an experienced thief named Eric the Bold, who is pressed in both adventures into special thieving services. In the first adventure, Eric's task is to steal a certain gem from the trap-riddled tower of the wizard Tormaq. The second adventure involves Tormaq hiring Eric to steal a mighty magic wand from his arch-rival Felspel. Both modules are set with a time limit of thirty real-world minutes to complete the task.

== Publication history ==
This adventure was originally published as Quest for the Fazzlewood in 1978 in a limited printing of twenty-six sheets with an outer folder and sold at WinterCon VII. The adventure was written by John and Laurie Van De Graaf, with art by Gregg DeCesare. This original module was a tournament scenario for a DM and one player with a thief character. Quest for the Fazzlewood was published by Metro Detroit Gamers, who also published Lost Caverns of Tsojcanth. Quest for the Fazzlewood was used as a tournament module at Wintercon VII, and later publicly released. The module was later expanded and revised as O1 The Gem and the Staff.

The Gem and the Staff was published by TSR in 1983 as two sixteen-page booklets with an outer folder, and included cardstock miniatures and nineteen illustrated maps for use by the player. The module contained viewed-from-above scale maps.

== Reception ==
Chris Hunter reviewed the scenario for Imagine magazine. He felt that time was extremely tight and noted that none of his playtesters finished either of the two tasks inside the allotted 30 minutes. Hunter also thought that the provided scoring system does not do a good job in evaluating how well a player has done and suggested dungeon masters (DMs) devise their own. He also criticised a lack of information on whether doors are locked or not—of crucial importance in a scenario of this type, according to him. However, Hunter pointed out that "a lot of thought has gone into this module". He concluded by calling it an "excellent module" that he "highly recommended".

Rick Swan reviewed the adventure in The Space Gamer No. 71. Swan called this an "extremely playable example" of TSR's One on One module line meant for only one player and one DM. Swan felt that "there are enough obstacles and encounters along the way to make it a real challenge". Swan listed the game's strict time limit of one hour, the ready-to use character sheet, and sixteen page map book among the aspects that make the module "a pleasure to play", although he concluded that because the adventure is only good for an hour of play, "replay value is virtually nil". He concluded by saying "The Gem and the Staff does an excellent job of filling a roleplaying niche by providing quality material for just two players ... but let's also hope that next time out we get a little more for our money."

Ken Rolston briefly reviewed The Gem and the Staff for Dragon magazine No. 135. Rolston felt that the two scenarios were "simple but exceptionally effective".
