= The Elixir of Life =

Dungeons & Dragons adventure module

- Code: RPGA4
- Authors: Bob Blake
- First published: 1983

The Elixir of Life is an adventure module published in 1983 for the Advanced Dungeons & Dragons fantasy role-playing game.

== Plot summary ==
The Elixir of Life is a sequel to The Forgotten King, and consists of two short adventure scenarios in which the player characters will need to recover the royal regalia from bugbears, and then acquire the Elixir of Life from a magician, with which they can revive the lost king of Pellham.

== Publication history ==
RPGA4 The Elixir of Life was written by Bob Blake, with art by Timothy Truman, and was published by TSR/RPGA in 1983 as a 16-page booklet with an outer folder. The module was a limited edition, sold only to members of the RPGA.
