= Greyhawk Wars (game) =

Fantasy board wargame

- Game box cover Game cover
- Designers: David Cook
- Players: 2 to 6
- Playing time: 180 minutes
- Skills: Dice rolling, strategy

Greyhawk Wars is a fantasy board wargame that was published by TSR, Inc. in 1991. The game was designed by David Cook as a strategic simulation of the eponymous Greyhawk Wars on the fictional world of Oerth, the World of Greyhawk campaign setting for the Dungeons & Dragons role-playing game.

== Components ==
Greyhawk Wars is a boxed game which included an eight-page rulebook, a 32-page Adventurer's Book, two fold-out color paper maps; two sheets of cardboard chits; 153 playing cards representing the various countries, events, mercenaries, and treasures; two ten-side dice, and a 32-page Adventurer's Book, containing a history of the war and a set of scenarios.

The maps depicted the various lands and nations involved in the war, and were joined along the edge to form the full game world. The map is sub-divided into areas of roughly equal size, with edges often lying along various boundaries, such as nation borders or terrain features. The nations are divided into good, neutral, and evil states, with green, gray, and red borders, respectively. The terrain types included plains, forest, marsh, mountains, hills, lakes, oceans, and wastes. The major rivers are also depicted, usually along area borders. The map contained a series of iconic symbols depicting the various capitols, ports, fortifications, and sites where treasure or mercenaries could be obtained.

In addition to their place on the map, each of the countries in the game is represented by a card. Each player starts with one or more country cards representing their home nations. Additional nations can be gained through alliance, conquest, or by liberating a conquered nation. The cards for these nations are placed under the home nation cards. Every nation card includes their alliance ratings, which determine how easily good or evil nations can ally with it. The card also includes a modifier for alliance attempts to specific countries, and a roster of troops that the country can raise.

Each player has a set of hero markers that they can use for various purposes each turn. These represent a band of heroes that can perform various special actions. They cannot be destroyed, although they can be hindered in various ways.

Armies are represented by colored chits that are printed with a shield symbol of the owning nation. These are placed on top of a stack of up to 5 troop units. Troop chits have a strength rating, a silhouette symbol for the creature type, and sometimes special information indicating a unique ability.

The color of the troop chits are based on the ethos of the creature, with good creatures being green, neutral creatures gray, and evil creatures in red (the same colors as the nation borders). There are a number of different creatures represented by these chits, and the various races or species are drawn from the Greyhawk world setting. Thus there are Elves, Bugbears, Orcs, Humans, and so forth. There are also counters to represent fleets for nations along the coast.

The various scenarios require from 2 to 6 players, with the two-player scenarios only using one of the maps. Each scenario lists the initial set-up, any special rules, and the victory conditions. The scenarios attempt to replay the situations described in the war history.

== Gameplay ==
The players command opposing armies struggling to kill enemies and control territory. The game begins with players selecting a scenario and receiving cards representing their countries, with each country card listing the available troops. Players deploy the counters for their armies on the map, a detailed rendering of Oerth, divided into dozens of discrete regions. Each region can hold a stack of up to five friendly troop counters. Players also receive a fixed number of hero counters, which function as super soldiers capable of a variety of special actions. Heroes may be deployed in any country controlled by a friendly player, one hero per region.

A die-roll determines which player goes first. After making sure his heroes are properly positioned, the active player begins his turn by drawing an Event Card and following the instructions. Some events are played immediately, while others are held and played at the owner's discretion. The active player then completes an action for each of his troop stacks and heroes. Troops may move (up to three regions for infantry and four for cavalry, with forests and other rough terrain impeding normal movement rates), fortify (by constructing a castle to increase the defensive capacity of the region), or disband (the player removes a stack from the map, making the troops available for deployment elsewhere).

Heroes may accompany troop stacks or split off on their own, moving up to six regions per turn. If a hero moves to an uncommitted country, he may engage in diplomacy by rolling a die and comparing the result to his home country's diplomacy rating. On a sufficiently high roll, the uncommitted country becomes an ally. Heroes can also recruit mercenaries by moving to a special mercenary recruitment area, then drawing a Mercenary Card. If the Mercenary Card's alignment is compatible with the hero, the player acquires the card and may use it to improve his chances in combat. Finally, heroes may search for treasure in regions designated as magic areas. Before he acquires a treasure, the hero must draw a Treasure Card and battle the indicated guardian monster. A single die-roll resolves the battle. A high roll means the hero triumphs, and the player adds one or more Treasure Cards to his hand.

Heroes and troops may engage in combat when occupying the same region as enemy forces. Both sides remove their counters from the map and arrange them in parallel lines so that every friendly counter faces at least one enemy. The attacker makes an assault against an opposing piece by rolling a ten-sided die and comparing the result to the attacking unit's strength, printed on the counter. If the roll is equal to or less than its strength, modified by any applicable Mercenary or Treasure Cards, the enemy suffers a hit. Strong units suffer two hits before dying, while weaker units die after a single hit. Combat lasts for three rounds, although if a hero is present the battle may be extended to four rounds, with the winner taking possession of the area. A hero may also increase any unit's strength by one. Regardless of the outcome of combat, a hero never suffers damage. At the end of a player's turn, any damaged units that haven't taken any actions may be healed to their full strength. One new army may also be raised in any unoccupied home country.

Each turn of play represents a full year in the game setting, and is divided into a series of phases. Every player must complete the procedure for a phase before continuing to the next phase. The first phase is used to determine the order in which each subsequent phase will be performed. The remaining phases are used to place heroes, draw event cards, and perform actions, in that order.

A player's heroes can move across up to six contiguous areas each turn, although their path may be blocked by the occupying armies of another player. Areas with certain terrain features (such as desert, hills, and forests) cost more movement to enter, while entering a swamp and mountain area ends movement for that turn.

The event cards produce a random element that can positively or negatively affect a player's situation. These can range from additional forces joining your side, to a sudden attack or rebellion that draws off some of your forces. The cards can also affect the actions of heroes.

The main part of the game occurs during the action phase. Here the armies can move, attack, create fortifications, or disband. A player performs actions with their armies and heroes one at a time, with all actions being performed before moving to another marker. Land armies can move through up to 3 areas in a turn (or 4 if they are all cavalry). Fleets can move up to 6 areas, but can never enter a land area. Ship markers can be used to carry troops that are in a port, and can unload them along a coast or on an island.

Certain special units have unique abilities in combat; cavalry can pursue a retreating enemy, or screen against pursuit (if the optional rule about pursuit is in play); marines can take part in sea battles; scouts can attack first in a round, with the result applied before being attacked. There are also specific races that gain a combat bonus in their native terrain, e.g. dwarves in mountains or hills.

== Relationship to WGS modules ==
The events described in Greyhawk Wars occur chronologically just after the conclusion of the Greyhawk module WGS2: Howl from the North. The WGS, or World of Greyhawk Swords series, was originally intended to be a trilogy of modules beginning with WGS1: Five Shall Be One. The third module in the series, which would have been coded WGS3, was never produced. Instead, the material originally intended for WGS3 was reworked and incorporated into the Greyhawk Wars game. As such, in some sense this game serves as the third installment in the WGS trilogy.

== Credits ==
The Greyhawk Wars game featured design by David Cook, editing by J. Robert King, and was published by TSR, Inc. The cover was by Roger Raupp, interior art by Ken Frank and Charles Frank, counter and card art was by Robin Raab and Karl Waller, and graphic design was provided by Dee Barnett.

== Reception ==
Rick Swan reviewed Greyhawk Wars for Dragon magazine, appearing in their edition #188 in December 1992. In comparing this game with other military simulation games, especially concerning the difficulty in understanding the rules and in how long it takes to play a game, he felt that Greyhawk Wars "... has more in common with the Squad Leader system than the Minion Hunter game. But Dave Cook has bent over backward to make the mechanics as painless as possible without sacrificing the sophisticated interplay that makes the best military simulations so appealing". Swan considered combat "... the least satisfying aspect of the game ..." even though it was "... fast and easy ...".

The three-round limit seems arbitrary, serving no clear purpose other than to minimize the number of casualties. Because the strength of an opponent isn't considered when resolving combat, an attack against a tough infantryman can be as effective as an attack against a puny goblin. And why must heroes be invulnerable? I don't care how tough he is, I don't think that any character ought to be able to survive an indefinite number of assaults.

Swan concluded the review by saying: "Combat aside, the Greyhawk Wars game features sensible, easily mastered rules that make the game fluid and intense. The variety of units, ranging from ships to treants, encourages players to experiment with different strategies. The Mercenary and Treasure Cards increase the tactical choices, while the Event Cards keep things interesting by introducing a steady stream of variables. To put it all in context, the 32-page Adventurer's Book provides a detailed historical background, enabling ambitious players to incorporate the results of the board game into a Greyhawk campaign. An intelligent design, well-executed and handsomely presented, the Greyhawk Wars game is a war game for people who hate war games".

In a later review, Swan called the Greyhawk setting a mess, but felt that after The City of Greyhawk, Greyhawk Wars "... took another step in the right direction by shaking things up with a much-needed dose of epic conflict".
