= The Dancing Hut of Baba Yaga =

Dungeons & Dragons adventure module

- TSR product code: 9471
- Character levels: 7-20
- Authors: Lisa Smedman
- First published: 1995

The Dancing Hut of Baba Yaga is an adventure module for the 2nd edition of the Advanced Dungeons & Dragons fantasy role-playing game.

== Plot summary ==
The Dancing Hut of Baba Yaga is an adventure that features Baba Yaga's dancing hut as its villain, spelling out the hut's powers and immunities.

== Publication history ==
The Dancing Hut of Baba Yaga was written by Lisa Smedman, and published by TSR, Inc.

== Reception ==
Rick Swan reviewed The Dancing Hut of Baba Yaga for Dragon magazine #222 (October 1995). He commented that the dancing hut "remains of one TSR's most durable villains, having boogalooed through a 1976 Dungeons & Dragons game supplement (Eldritch Wizardry), the AD&D Book of Artifacts, and a couple of Dragon Magazine articles." Swan concludes by saying, "Smedman serves up an adventure with an avalanche of adversaries and what seems like an infinite number of rooms. Sure, it's a glorified dungeon crawl, but it's a dungeon crawl of transcendent proportions—how many dungeons do you know that lead to Alternate Reality Tokyo?"
