= Quest for the Silver Sword =

Dungeons & Dragons adventure module

- Character levels: 2-3
- Authors: William W. Connors
- First published: 1992

Quest for the Silver Sword is an adventure module published in 1992 for the Dungeons & Dragons fantasy role-playing game. The adventure is designed for four to six characters of 2nd to 3rd level, and is the first product released under the Thunder Rift setting. The module is TSR product number 9342.

== Plot summary ==
Quest for the Silver Sword involves the exploration of a haunted keep.

== Publication history ==
Quest for the Silver Sword was written by William W. Connors. The adventure features cover art by Jeff Easley and interior art by Karl Waller.

== Reception ==
Rick Swan reviewed Quest for the Silver Sword for Dragon magazine #191 (March 1993). He reviewed the adventure Sword and Shield in the same column, and felt that these two introductory adventures typify the "easy-on-the-brain" revised Dungeons & Dragons game, as each of them "boasts clutter-free story lines, maps that double as game boards, and colorful sheets of punch-out counters that makes playing a breeze". He felt that Quest for the Silver Sword would be easier to manage for beginners than Sword and Shield. Swan commented: "Game snobs may sneer at the meager plots and superficial characters - these are, after all, little more than glorified dungeon crawls - but the nasty monsters and gaudy treasures are guaranteed to dazzle novices. Weary Dungeon Masters can run either adventure almost effortlessly; I didn't even have to read them first."
