= The Forest Oracle =

Dungeons & Dragons adventure module

- Code: N2
- TSR product code: 9084
- Rules required: AD&D (1st Edition)
- Character levels: 2 - 4
- Campaign setting: Generic
- Authors: Carl Smith
- First published: 1984

Linked modules
- N1, N2, N3, N4, N5

The Forest Oracle is an adventure module for the Dungeons & Dragons role-playing game.

== Plot summary ==
Forest Oracle is an adventure scenario in which the player characters seek the help of a Great Druid to lift a curse on the land known as the Downs.

The Downs, a lush valley on the edge of the Greate Olde Woode, are dying. Livestock and crops simply rot and drop to the parched ground. The druids who have protected the area have retreated into the thick forest, and the party must find them to undo the evil that's happening in the Downs.

== Publication history ==
N2 Forest Oracle was written by Carl Smith, with a cover by Keith Parkinson and interior illustrations by Jeff Easley, and was published by TSR in 1984 as a 32-page booklet with an outer folder.

== Reception ==
In 2005, a poster on ENWorld described The Forest Oracle as the worst TSR adventure module ever published, beginning a process of canonizing it as poorly-received. Later retrospectives have concurred, calling out the adventure's linearity and "mundane, nonsensical, and - worst of all - dull" structure.
