= Wizard's Challenge =

Dungeons & Dragons adventure module

- Code: HHQ2
- First published: 1992

Wizard's Challenge is a 1992 adventure by Tim Beach for the 2nd edition of the Advanced Dungeons & Dragons fantasy role-playing game, published by TSR in their One-On-One series. The sequel Wizard's Challenge II by Kevin Melka appeared in 1994.

== Plot summary ==
The module is designed for individual low-level mages or parties of up to three characters. It centers on the village of Northbank, a previously busy town with a current minor connection to nearby wizards. "Haunting visitations" and murder begin the adventure which focuses on roleplaying and problem-solving vs. combat.

== Reception ==
Keith H. Eisenbeis reviewed Wizard's Challenge in the March–April 1993 issue of White Wolf Magazine. He described it as an "excellent module that forms a great start for any mage [player character]", and stated that it was "well worth the price". Eisenbeis rated it an overall 4 out of a possible 5.
