= Cleric's Challenge II =

Dungeons & Dragons adventure module

- Genre: Role-playing games
- Publisher: TSR
- Publication date: 1995
- Preceded by: Cleric's Challenge

Cleric's Challenge II is an adventure module for the 2nd edition of the Advanced Dungeons & Dragons fantasy role-playing game, published in 1995.

== Plot summary ==
Cleric's Challenge II is a solo adventure in which the player character is a cleric of level 4-6, who is sent to a rural town. The town's temple was destroyed years ago and its priest disappeared, and the rivalry between its competing wineries turned ugly. The character must help the village's new priest, who is having trouble gaining new worshippers for the rebuilt temple. The character discovers a series of murders upon arrival, and must talk to the villagers to find out who or what is killing them.

== Publication history ==
Cleric's Challenge II was published by TSR, Inc. in 1995.

== Reception ==
Cliff Ramshaw reviewed Cleric's Challenge II for Arcane magazine, rating it a 7 out of 10 overall. Ramshaw called the adventure "something of a who's-doing-it". He said in conclusion: "Not high fantasy by any means, but Cleric's Challenge II is sufficiently intriguing and original to keep most players entertained for a night or two."
