= A Hero's Tale =

D&D module

- Genre: Role-playing games
- Publisher: TSR
- Publication date: 1996

A Hero's Tale is an adventure module for the 2nd edition of the Advanced Dungeons & Dragons fantasy role-playing game, published in 1996.

== Plot summary ==
A Hero's Tale is a collection of ten adventure scenarios intended variously for characters from 1st level up through 10th level. Each of these adventures are linked together to form a campaign regarding an artifact known as the Waning Star; the player characters encounter non-player characters in the scenarios who seek the Waning Star, and are able to feel its influence.

== Publication history ==
A Hero's Tale was published by TSR, Inc. in 1996.

== Reception ==
Paul Pettengale reviewed A Hero's Tale for Arcane magazine, rating it an 8 out of 10 overall. He commented that "The scenarios are not too complicated, mainly because of their brevity, and could perhaps be described as little more than encounters. Still, each one is good - there's not a duffer throughout the collection - and I'm sure referees will end up using each and every one of them." He adds: "Where this collection of scenarios is especially clever, though, is in the way they're all linked together, however tenuously, to form a complete mini-campaign in their own right. [...] Whether they actually guess what's afoot, however, is unlikely until towards the end of the collection." Pettengale concluded his review by stating: "So, a worthy bunch of short scenarios which should fit into just about any ongoing campaign. Oh, and the title, in case you were wondering, derives from passages of monologue at the start of each scenario spoken by Thad Bravencloke - a chap who's been through all of this long, long ago."
