= The Official RPGA Tournament Handbook =

D&D module

- Code: C6
- Rules required: AD&D
- Character levels: 4 - 8
- Campaign setting: Greyhawk / Generic AD&D
- Authors: Daniel Kramarsky; Jean & Bruce Rabe
- First published: 1987

Linked modules
- C6

The Official RPGA Handbook is an adventure module for the Dungeons & Dragons fantasy role-playing game, set in the game's World of Greyhawk campaign setting. TSR, Inc. published the module in 1987 for the first edition Advanced Dungeons & Dragons rules. It is part of the "C" series of modules, a set of unrelated adventures originally designed for competition play ("c" being the first letter in competition).

== Plot summary ==
The Official RPGA Tournament Handbook is a supplement containing the official rules for gamemastering adventures for RPGA Advanced Dungeons & Dragons tournaments. Twelve pages of this module are devoted to essays on how to design, run, and judge tournaments. The book features two tournament adventure scenarios, titled "Honor Guard" and "The Long Way Home".

- "Honor Guard": This scenario is a two-session treatment which follows the progress of an important religious figure and his sacred relics from one town to another. The player characters (PCs) are assigned to protect the prophet and his possessions. The PCs escort the exalted but irascible holy personality from the city of Jesten to the city of Alm, with a brief stop in the town of Slapdash, as he transports the Crytal of Light. Little do they know that a wizard intends to steal the holy relic.
- "The Long Way Home": In a remote part of the Desert of Ages, the player characters are forced to stop at a small, isolated, deserted town among rocky bluffs. There they encounter the restless spirit of dwarf Ottis, who demands that in exchange for water the party find a magic relic, the hammer Rocksplitter, and use it to drive out duergar invaders and free his people.

Twenty pages of pullout materials are provided with the scenarios, eight of which are devoted to pre-designed player characters, with six PCs per scenario.

== Publication history ==
The Official RPGA Tournament Handbook (C6) was written by Daniel Kramarsky, Jean, and Bruce Rabe, and was published by TSR in 1987 as a 64-page booklet with an outer folder. Design, development, and editing were done by Daniel Kramarsky, Jean and Bruce Rabe, Penny Petticord, and Harold Johnson.

The module contains two short adventures, either for one-evening sessions or for incorporation into an ongoing campaign, instructions and score sheets to run a role-playing tournament, and directions on how to design one's own tournament.

== Reception ==
Ken Rolston reviewed The Official RPGA Tournament Handbook for Dragon magazine #133 (May 1988). He wrote that while the text on running and judging tournaments is of little interest to most DMs, the five-page section on designing tournaments is "perhaps the finest guide to designing and refereeing AD&D game adventure sessions I've ever seen. The section 'Tournament Design Goals' [...] offers excellent advice for all scenario designers. Many of us would instantly recognize the value of these goals, but just as many of us are likely to ignore them in the design of our adventures, often to the detriment of ourselves and our players." Rolston called the two adventure scenarios "first-rate, original, well-motivated and plausible, and tactically challenging", and said that they "represent a more modern approach to tournament scenarios" when compared to those designed in the "big dungeon" tradition, citing that they "both have minor dungeon-style sequences, but most of their action depends on wilderness and campaign-style settings and plot devices. Their themes are also more modest in scale, as contrasted to the epic, save-the-universe themes of Scourge of the Slavelords and Egg of the Phoenix." Rolston stated that although this product warranted his unreserved enthusiasm, it may not be that pleasing for the average gamer: "Its small scale makes possible the fineness of its presentation, but less fussy tastes may prefer something with more 'stuff' and epic grandeur".
