= Sons of Azca =

Tabletop role-playing game supplement for Dungeons & Dragons

- Author: John Nephew
- Genre: Role-playing games
- Publisher: TSR
- Publication date: 1991

Sons of Azca is an accessory for the Dungeons & Dragons fantasy role-playing game (Hollow World setting), published in 1991.

== Publication history ==
The accessory was written by John Nephew and published by TSR.

== Contents ==
The accessory "provides a detailed description of one of the civilizations from the Dungeons and Dragons 'Hollow World' game setting". It is modeled after the Aztec civilization. The accessory comprises a 64-page Dungeon Master book with historical and cultural information on the Azca people, a 32-page campaign booklet with five adventures and monster descriptions, and a map.

== Reception ==
Keith H. Eisenbeis reviewed the module in issue No. 38 of White Wolf magazine. He stated that it "is worth buying if you are interested in a campaign setting with an Aztec flavor [but] because the Azcan Empire is so different from a typical medieval setting it may only end up being useful for [a] limited number of adventures". Eisenbeis rated the accessory an overall 3 out of a possible 5.
