= Five Shall Be One =

Dungeons & Dragons adventure module

- Code: WGS1
- Rules required: 2nd Ed AD&D
- Character levels: 7 - 9
- Campaign setting: Greyhawk
- Authors: Carl Sargent
- First published: 1991

Linked modules
- WGS1 WGS2 Greyhawk Wars

Five Shall Be One is an adventure module for the fantasy role-playing game Dungeons & Dragons, set in the game's World of Greyhawk campaign setting. The module bears the code WGS1 and was published by TSR in 1991 for the second edition Advanced Dungeons & Dragons rules.

== Plot summary ==
The title of the module refers to the five Blades of Corusk, ancient magical swords which, according to the legends of Greyhawk's Suloise barbarians, can be brought together to be made even more powerful.

The module also contains information regarding Garel Enkdal, an underground city of orcs in the Griff Mountains of the northeastern Flanaess.

== Publication history ==
The adventure was written by Carl Sargent with cover art by Jeff Starlind and interior art by Ken Frank. It was originally intended as the first of three modules in the "World of Greyhawk Swords" (WGS) trilogy. It therefore precedes the second "Swords" module, WGS2 - Howl from the North. The third module in the series (which would have been coded WGS3) was never produced. Instead, the material originally intended for WGS3 was reworked and incorporated into the board game Greyhawk Wars.
