= I, Tyrant =

1996 role-playing game accessory by Aaron Allston

- Front cover
- Author: Aaron Allston
- Genre: Role-playing games
- Publisher: TSR
- Publication date: 1996
- Media type: Book

I, Tyrant is an accessory for the 2nd edition of the Advanced Dungeons & Dragons fantasy role-playing game.

== Contents ==
I, Tyrant is a supplement which provides further details about beholders from what is given in the Monstrous Manual, including information about the history of beholders as a race, and their religion, culture, settlements and psychology, and game statistics on beholder deviants. The book also provides rules for psionics and magic items available to beholders.

== Publication history ==
I, Tyrant was published by TSR in 1996 as a 93-page book. It was designed by Aaron Allston, and featured cover illustrations by Dana Knutson, and interior illustrations by Arnie Swekel, David Martin, Glen Michael Angus, William O'Connor, and Randy Post.

I, Tyrant and the module Eye of Pain were the first publications from TSR in their "Monstrous Arcana" series, which details the most popular AD&D monsters.

== Reception ==
David Comford reviewed I, Tyrant for Arcane magazine, rating it an 8 out of 10 overall. He comments: "As if these multi-eyed nightmares weren't deadly enough, now they can have magical items and psionics too." He notes that through I, Tyrant, "the amazing versatility of the race is depicted in great detail, raising them from merely a collection of interesting monsters to a curious and powerful civilisation. The results give referees a myriad of encounter opportunities and possibilities for inserting beholder NPCs into existing campaigns for that extra punch of spice." Comford concludes his review by stating: "The Monstrous Manual will still suffice for brief encounters with these creatures, but through expanded details on the creatures' behavior, powers, driving forces and tips on how to defeat them, I, Tyrant is useful to referees or players planning to embark upon a beholder-heavy adventure."

== Reviews ==
- Dragão Brasil #21, p. 56-57 (in Portuguese)
