= The Knight of Newts =

Role-playing game adventure

- Author: Dale "Slade" Henson
- Genre: Role-playing games
- Publisher: TSR
- Publication date: 1993

The Knight of Newts is an adventure for the Rules Cyclopedia edition of the Dungeons & Dragons fantasy role-playing game, published in 1993.

== Publication history ==
The Knight of Newts was written by Dale "Slade" Henson. Doug Stewart was the editor. Cover art was by David Dorman, with interior art by Dave Simons and Karl Waller.

== Contents ==
This beginner's module (for level 1–2 players) is 16-pages long.

- The Newt, A New Monster
- New Color Monster Standups
- New Magical Items
- Color Poster Map
- New Rules for Adventuring Underwater

== Reception ==
Keith H. Eisenbeis reviewed the module in issue No. 38 of White Wolf magazine. He stated that the "module's strong point is it's [sic] simplicity, which is highly desirable for very inexperienced players", and compared it to the "Dungeonquest" and "Dragonquest" games. He noted that it would also be "boring to the more experienced". Eisenbeis rated the accessory an overall 2 out of a possible 5.
