= TSR Jam 1999 =

Role-playing came supplement

TSR Jam 1999 is a 1999 role-playing game adventure published by TSR for Advanced Dungeons & Dragons.

== Plot summary ==
TSR Jam 1999 is a collection of seven adventures from different campaign settings.

== Reviews ==
- Envoyer
- Backstab #15
- The Guild Companion (Mar 2000)
