= Swords of the Undercity =

Dungeons & Dragons adventure module

- Code: CA1
- TSR product code: 9150
- Rules required: Advanced Dungeons and Dragons, 1st ED
- Character levels: 8 - 12
- Campaign setting: CA
- Authors: Carl Smith, Bruce Nesmith, Douglas Niles
- First published: 1985

Linked modules
- CA1, CA2

Swords of the Undercity is a 1985 adventure module for the Advanced Dungeons & Dragons fantasy role-playing game for the Lankhmar setting.

== Plot summary ==
Swords of the Undercity is the first module published for the Lankhmar – City of Adventure supplement. Swords of the Undercity contains three Lankhmar adventure scenarios that connect to each other: "The Secret of Urgaan of Angarngi", "The Web of Mog", and "Claws of the Shree-kah".

== Publication history ==
Swords of the Undercity was written by Carl Smith, Bruce Nesmith, and Doug Niles, with a cover by Keith Parkinson, and was published by TSR in 1985 as a 32-page booklet with an outer folder.

== Reception ==
Stephen H. Dorneman reviewed the adventure in Space Gamer/Fantasy Gamer No. 80. He commented that the adventure has "excellent production values throughout, and a plethora of useful data and errata for any Gamesmaster using the Lankhmar setting in their campaign. But more importantly, Swords of the Undercity is an adventure supplement that can help a gamemaster provide exciting, original AD&D adventure to his or her players without sacrificing the mysterious, magical feel of Fritz Leiber's creation."
