= Treasure Hunt (module) =

Dungeons & Dragons adventure module

- Code: N4
- TSR product code: 9185
- Rules required: AD&D (1st Edition)
- Character levels: 0–1
- Campaign setting: Generic
- Authors: Aaron Allston
- First published: 1986

Linked modules
- N1, N2, N3, N4, N5

Treasure Hunt is an adventure module for the Advanced Dungeons & Dragons (AD&D) role-playing game, written by Aaron Allston for the 1st edition Advanced Dungeons & Dragons (AD&D) rules. The player characters must evolve into their roles as the adventure progresses, beginning as slaves on a galley who become freed after a shipwreck on an island where orcs and goblins contend over a treasure. The adventure received a positive review from White Dwarf magazine.

== Plot summary ==
The characters begin in the Korinn Archipelago, and have been captured by slavers. A sea storm sends the pirate ship on which the characters are being held off course, and it crashes on an island once ruled by Viledel, the Sea King. Orcs and goblins are involved in a conflict over a treasure on the island. The characters begin with no possessions or equipment and no money. After surviving the shipwreck, the characters are able to make choices which will both help them develop their sense of freedom and determine what career they will take as adventurers.

== Gameplay ==
Treasure Hunt is an adventure designed for zero-level characters. The player characters earn their way to 1st level. The scenario allows the characters to evolve into their roles as adventurers, instead of starting them out on that career. Those who fight well become fighters, those who study the magical items found along the way become magic-users, those who attempt thieving activities become thieves, and so on. The actions and attitudes taken by each character determine which character class that character will be.

Each character's behavior also determines their alignment. The Dungeon Master (DM) makes regular alignment checks, and keeps track of how the characters behave in terms of role-playing and with handling magic and combat, recording how a character is developing towards a first-level character with a character class. The module includes record sheets as handouts for the DM to track PC behaviors.

There is a two-page "Players' Introduction" at the beginning of the adventure that each player is supposed to read themself. The adventure includes a two-page appendix entitled "If Things Go Wrong", which is a detailed, episode-by-episode treatment of ways to handle the player characters if they don't do what they are expected to do during the course of the adventure.

== Publication history ==
Treasure Hunt was written by Aaron Allston, and featured a cover by Jeff Easley and interior illustrations by Stephen Fabian. It was published by TSR in 1986 as a 36-page booklet with a 3-panel outer folder. Included in the module is a 12-page removable inner section.

The Korinn Archipelago later appeared in the accessory FR2 Moonshae.

Issue 194 of Dungeon Magazine featured Temple of the Weeping Goddess, a zero-level adventure for 4th edition rules written by Philippe-Antoine Menard, who called it "both a sequel and a tribute" to Treasure Hunt.

== Reception ==
Carl Sargent reviewed Treasure Hunt for White Dwarf No. 93, noting that characters "will need to be resourceful in their choice of action". He felt that the plotline was "guided but not obtrusively so." He also complimented the "If Things Go Wrong" section: "One of author Aaron Allston's best innovations is an extensive section for the GM of the 'What if they do/don't do this?' variety - very useful indeed." Sargent noted an emphasis on roleplaying, careful observation, planning, and sensible negotiation, which he found refreshing, and found the whole adventure "beautifully simple". He felt that "As a first adventure for initiates, this can't be beaten. For old hands who may be tiring of AD&D, it will be a welcome change." Sargent felt that the pre-generated characters were too weak in most cases, but that Allston handled this problem by avoiding excessive scores, and suggesting that players double up better scores on combinations, which leaves options open for further character evolution. Sargent concluded the review by stating, "This is a goodie: well-crafted... and truly creative. Well worth a look even if you don't normally buy AD&D adventures, you won't be disappointed."

Ken Rolston reviewed Treasure Hunt for Dragon magazine No. 125, calling Treasure Hunt a "fine example" of the subgenre of "low-level adventures in which the characters are stripped of all their game-mechanics resources and forced to improvise with their wits". Rolston complimented a few of Allston's design choices, including having player characters graduate from zero-level to 1st level with the DM tracking their progress, providing explicit staging for the DM, and displaying flexibility with interpreting the AD&D game rules. He felt the layout and presentation was generally good, calling the interior artwork "stylish", but the cover artwork "unremarkable", and the interior maps "uninspired but functional". Rolston criticized some of the layout choices, such as having the players read the "Players' Introduction", feeling that the material would be much better as a player handout.
