= Eye of the Wyvern =

Dungeons & Dragons adventure module

- Authors: Jeff Grubb

Eye of the Wyvern is an adventure module for the Dungeons & Dragons fantasy role-playing game.

== Plot summary ==
Eye of the Wyvern is a wilderness adventure, and part of TSR's Fast-Play Game adventure series. The Fast-Play products, which began with the introductory adventure "The Ruined Tower" and continued with Wrath of the Minotaur and Eye of the Wyvern, are intended to be easy to set up, run, and play, even for players new to D&D and roleplaying games. Eye of the Wyvern briefly introduces the game system, with a "What is Roleplaying?" section and an introduction to the D&D concepts of character stats, character class, and race.

== Publication history ==
Eye of the Wyvern was published by TSR and written by Jeff Grubb.

== Reception ==
Scott D. Haring reviewed Eye of the Wyvern for the online version of Pyramid on March 19, 1999. He felt that Eye of the Wyvern has "enough hooks to keep players interested, but is otherwise straightforward and to the point -- exactly what this kind of product needs to be". Haring summarized his review by stating "Eye of the Wyvern doesn't have very high aspirations; the adventure is simple and the ultimate in linear-ness. But designing a get-started-quick, anybody-can-play roleplaying module is a very high aspiration for the future of this hobby, and in that, this book gets high marks."

== Reviews ==
- Casus Belli #119
