= Patriots of Ulek =

Dungeons & Dragons adventure module

- Code: WGQ1
- Rules required: 2nd Ed AD&D
- Character levels: 1 - 3
- Campaign setting: Greyhawk
- Authors: Anthony Pryor
- First published: 1992

Patriots of Ulek is an adventure module for the fantasy role-playing game Dungeons & Dragons, set in the game's World of Greyhawk campaign setting.

== Plot summary ==
The adventure takes place in the Principality of Ulek in the southwestern Flanaess.

== Publication history ==
The module bears the code WGQ1 and was published by TSR, Inc. in 1992 for the second edition Advanced Dungeons & Dragons rules.

The module was written by Anthony Pryor with cover art by John and Laura Lakey and interior art by Ken Frank.
