= Howl from the North =

Dungeons & Dragons adventure module

- Code: WGS2
- Rules required: 2nd Ed AD&D
- Character levels: 8 - 10
- Campaign setting: Greyhawk
- Authors: Dale "Slade" Henson
- First published: 1991

Linked modules
- WGS1 WGS2 Greyhawk Wars

Howl from the North is an adventure module for the Dungeons & Dragons fantasy role-playing game, set in the game's World of Greyhawk campaign setting. The module bears the code WGS2 and was published by TSR, Inc. in 1991 for the second edition Advanced Dungeons & Dragons rules.

== Plot summary ==
The events in this module take place in the Flanaess immediately preceding the onset of the Greyhawk Wars themselves. As with WGS1, the plot of the module focuses on the Five Blades of Corusk. These are ancient magical swords which, according to the legends of Greyhawk's Suloise barbarians, can be brought together to be made even more powerful.

== Publication history ==
The adventure was written by Dale "Slade" Henson with cover art by Glen Orbik and interior art by Ken Frank. It was originally intended as the second of three modules in the "World of Greyhawk Swords" (WGS) trilogy. It is therefore the sequel to the first "Swords" module, WGS1 - Five Shall Be One. The third module in the series (which would have been coded WGS3) was never produced. Instead, the material originally intended for WGS3 was reworked and incorporated into the board game Greyhawk Wars.
