= Rage of the Rakasta =

- Author: William W. Connors
- Genre: Role-playing games
- Publisher: TSR
- Publication date: 1993

Rage of the Rakasta is an adventure for the Rules Cyclopedia edition of the Dungeons & Dragons fantasy role-playing game, published in 1993.

== Publication history ==
The module was written by William W. Connors and published by TSR.

== Contents ==
This 16-page adventure regards the Rakasta, "an intelligent feline race resembling bipedal tigers," and is designed for one beginning character. The 17-room dungeon is small and usable with "standard-sized miniatures". Reviewer Eisenbeis likened the adventure to the "Dungeonquest" and "Dragonquest" games.

== Reception ==
Keith H. Eisenbeis reviewed the module in issue No. 38 of White Wolf magazine. He stated that it "is designed for beginning players and DMs, for whom it should be enjoyable. However, its simplicity will leave most others bored. This product is not thus not recommended for more experienced players". Eisenbeis rated the accessory an overall 3 out of a possible 5.
