= Blade of Vengeance =

Dungeons & Dragons adventure module

- The cover of the module, with art by Jeremy Goodwin.
- Code: O2
- TSR product code: 9108
- Rules required: D&D Expert Set
- Character levels: 7
- Authors: Jim Bambra
- First published: 1984

Linked modules
- O1, O2

Blade of Vengeance is an adventure module written by Jim Bambra and published by TSR in 1984 for the Expert Set of the Dungeons & Dragons fantasy role-playing game. It is a one-on-one scenario for one player and one gamemaster. The player character is a 7th level Elf.

== Plot summary ==
Blade of Vengeance is an adventure scenario in a great forest for an elf player character. Erystelle of Dorneryll finds the peaceful woodland home of his youth, Emerlas, aflame. His family has been slaughtered by something possessing huge claws and more powerful than the hobgoblins who are still around when he arrives.

The player character's goal is to defeat a Red Dragon who destroyed the character's home and killed the character's entire family. However, the scenario is about more than just revenge: Erystelle must find a way to recall the great Elven hero Galannor.

== Publication history ==
O2 Blade of Vengeance was written by Jim Bambra, with art by Jeremy Goodwin (a.k.a. Jes Goodwin). It was published by TSR in 1984 as a 32-page booklet with an outer folder. It was "UK-produced".

== Reception ==
Simon Forrest reviewed the module in Imagine magazine, giving it a positive review. Forrest noted that the clues are straightforward and help from the other inhabitants of Emerlas ensures that the player cannot go far wrong. Yet the enemies are not passive but are rather becoming an increasing menace as time goes on. He considered the climax - when Erystelle sneaks into the enemies' camp to kill their leader - to be the scenario's weakest point, according to Forrest, lacking in "originality and atmosphere". Nevertheless, Forrest declared this to be "a splendid module", praising the artwork and maps as well as the clear layout and ease-of-use. Forrest lauded the well-developed and consistent atmosphere of the scenario and thought it would be "fascinating" for inexperienced players and "pleasant enough" for the more demanding.
