= Tales of Enchantment =

- Code: GA3
- TSR product code: 9428
- Authors: Jim Musser
- First published: 1993

Tales of Enchantment is an adventure for the 2nd edition of the Advanced Dungeons & Dragons fantasy role-playing game, published in 1993.

== Contents ==
This 32-page, forest-based adventure is for 3–6 players, level 5–8. Rather than providing dungeons to explore, it highlights roleplaying and telling the story of the search for a missing young man who is in love with a pixie.

== Publication history ==
The module's author is Jim Musser and it was published by TSR.

== Reception ==
Keith H. Eisenbeis reviewed Tales of Enchantment in a 1994 issue of White Wolf. On a scale of 1 to 5, he rated the module a 4 for Concepts, and Complexity, and a 3 for Appearance, Playability and Value. He stated, "This adventure is an excellent value for players of elves, druids or rangers; it offers ample opportunity to make use of special abilities. However, players who prefer fighting over talking may be frustrated." Overall, Eisenbeis rated it a 3.5 out of 5.
