= Against the Cult of the Reptile God =

Dungeons & Dragons adventure module

- The cover of the module, with art by Tim Truman.
- Code: N1
- TSR product code: 9063
- Rules required: Advanced Dungeons & Dragons 1st edition
- Character levels: 1–3
- Campaign setting: Greyhawk
- Authors: Douglas Niles
- First published: 1982

Linked modules
- N1, N2, N3, N4, N5

Against the Cult of the Reptile God is an adventure module for the first edition of the Advanced Dungeons & Dragons fantasy roleplaying game, set in the game's World of Greyhawk campaign setting. It is designed for novice players and gamemasters. The suggested party size is 4-7 characters of level 1-3.

== Plot ==
The adventure takes place on the border between the Gran March and the Kingdom of Keoland in the western Flanaess. It is one of the most challenging of the early AD&D modules, featuring a mystery that leads to adventures in town, the wilderness and a dungeon. The scenario details the village and the dungeon caves inhabited by the cult.

The player characters arrive in the village of Orlane, where some villagers are friendly towards the characters, whereas some are distant and others are very distrustful, and the characters will need to find out what is wrong in the village. They find that Orlane is menaced by an evil cult, and the characters have to stop the cult. The module reaches its climax when the characters travel to the lair of Explictica Defilus, the self described "Reptile God", and slay the creature.

== Publication history ==
The module was written by Douglas Niles, with the cover drawn by Tim Truman, and published by TSR in 1982 as a 32-page booklet with an outer folder for the first edition of Advanced Dungeons & Dragons rules. It bears the code N1 and is the first in the N (Novice) series of unrelated adventures for beginning characters.

The module was the first design by Doug Niles after he came to work at TSR. Working from an old brief, Niles completed the module in four weeks. There is a printing error in one of the module maps, the maze near the troglodytes has no exit.

== Reception ==
Doug Cowie reviewed the module in Imagine magazine and gave it a mixed review. He noted that it was "a good module" with carefully worked out details, an interesting plot and innovative touches. Cowie praised the quality of the maps, the detailed village and non-player characters. In addition, he was pleased with the fact that "the unknown adversaries do not tamely wait for the players to come and get them", but rather take the initiative if the players take too long in their investigation. On the downside, Cowie pointed out that the module is quite vague on how to get the party started and that there are some surprising omissions when it comes to providing game statistics for the non-player characters. Moreover, according to him "the structure is a stereotype": the heroes arrive in a village, investigate, go for a wilderness trip and end the adventure with a showdown in a "challenging, if traditional" dungeon.

Jim Bambra reviewed Against the Cult of the Reptile God for White Dwarf, and gave it 8/10 overall. Bambra felt that the village is well laid out, requiring the players to interact with its populace to piece together the various clues. Bambra noted that once the players find out what is wrong with the village, "they are in for a very hard time as the action quickly develops into a life and death struggle against the Cult." Bambra concluded that this module proves that "low level adventures are just as interesting and exciting as their high level counterparts".

Thomas M. Brooks reviewed Against the Cult of the Reptile God for Fantasy Gamer magazine and stated that "Overall, this is the best adventure I have played or run for low-level characters. It should provide several enjoyable hours for creative gamers and for the dungeon master."

Against the Cult of the Reptile God was ranked the 19th greatest Dungeons & Dragons adventure of all time by Dungeon magazine in 2004, on the 30th anniversary of the Dungeons & Dragons game.
