= Destiny of Kings =

1986 Dungeons & Dragons adventure module

- Code: N3
- TSR product code: 9163
- Authors: Stephen Bourne
- First published: 1986

Linked modules
- N1, N2, N3, N4, N5

Destiny of Kings is a 1986 adventure module for the Advanced Dungeons & Dragons fantasy role-playing game.

== Plot summary ==
Destiny of Kings is an adventure in which an assassin murders the King of Andevar, and his brother takes the throne. A retainer loyal to the previous king hires the player characters to rescue the missing prince, who is held captive by minions of the usurper. The characters are charged with bringing him back to claim the throne. The module contains descriptions of locations including a citadel, a castle, an abbey and an inn.

King Halfred of Dunador has died as a result of a mysterious accident. As the heir has disappeared, the evil Lord Edrin intends to seize the throne. Hollend, head of the Royal Council, tasks the player characters with finding the missing Prince. The characters must contend with Dukes and their schemes, raiders and corpses as they trace the pilgrimage the Prince took before the King was killed. They must uncover and rectify terrible deeds, and send traitors to justice.

== Publication history ==
N3 Destiny of Kings was published by TSR in 1986, as a 32-page booklet with an outer folder. The module was written by Stephen Bourne, with cover art by Keith Parkinson and interior art by James Roslof. The module includes a fold-out cover containing a color map of the area.

In 1998 the module was re-released for 2nd Edition AD&D.

== Reception ==
Graham Staplehurst reviewed Destiny of Kings for White Dwarf #80, calling it "a well-planned adventure for a medium-sized, low-level AD&D party”. He considered the adventure particularly appropriate for an inexperienced or novice party, as very experienced players "may find it a little sparse on the intrigue and cloak-and-dagger side". Staplehurst found a few bugs in the text, although he felt the module was well introduced, with useful aids such as a glossary of names and places and a plot synopsis. He felt that the random encounters were overpowered, and noted a walled town of "ludicrous design, containing a jousting field just 130' long". He concluded the review by describing the module as, "Overall, a well-thought out adventure that shouldn't be too hard to slot into an existing campaign, and would make a very good introduction for new players."

== Reviews ==
- Envoyer #21
