= The Murky Deep =

- Code: GA1
- TSR product code: 9422
- First published: 1993

The Murky Deep is an adventure for the 2nd edition of the Advanced Dungeons & Dragons fantasy role-playing game, published in 1993.

== Publication history ==
The module was written by Norman B. Ritchie and published by TSR.

== Contents ==
According to reviewer Gene Alloway, The Murky Deep is the initial module in a series of "general adventures" that are applicable anywhere. This module with an underwater setting is for 6–8 players of levels 5–8.

== Reception ==
Gene Alloway reviewed The Murky Deep in a 1993 issue of White Wolf. He stated that the module's organization is simple and clear, and its graphics and layout are positives. He concluded that:

With a little work it could be put in any AD&D setting, though the GM would have to supply more details if the characters got curious minor points (and they always do). The main maps are excellent and the overall product is fun and usable. This is a good basic adventure.

Overall, Alloway rated the module a 3 out of a possible 5.

== Reviews ==
- Australian Realms #12
