= Dragon Keep =

Dungeons & Dragons adventure module

- Code: DLE3
- Authors: Rick Swan
- First published: 1990

Dragon Keep is an adventure module published in 1989 for the Dungeons & Dragons fantasy role-playing game.

== Plot summary ==
Dragon Keep is a Dragonlance adventure scenario which ends the trilogy started with In Search of Dragons and Dragon Magic. The player characters journey from Lunitari to deep in the ocean of Krynn to defeat the daughter of Takhisis.

== Publication history ==
DLE3 Dragon Keep was written by Rick Swan, with a cover by Jack Pennington, and was published by TSR in 1990 as a 64-page booklet with a large color map and an outer folder.

== Reception ==
In the February–March 1990 edition of Games International (Issue 13), Dave Hughes noted that this module was "one of those rarities: a module that is part of a series yet can be played as a stand alone adventure." Noting the high quality and amount of information provided, Hughes concluded by giving it an excellent rating of 9 out of 10, saying, "In addition to being a different and exceptional module, Dragon Keep is exceptional value for money."
