= Eye of Pain =

D&D game module

Eye of Pain is an adventure for the 2nd edition of the Advanced Dungeons & Dragons fantasy role-playing game.

== Plot summary ==
Eye of Pain is the first part of an adventure trilogy, in which the player characters are hired by a disguised elder orb to test their usefulness in its plans to overthrow a hive mother and take over its city.

The inside front cover has maps of the lair of a beholder, and its location near a small community.

== Publication history ==
Eye of Pain was designed by Thomas M. Reid, and featured a cover illustration by Dana Knutson, and interior illustrations by Arnie Swekel.

The sourcebook I, Tyrant and Eye of Pain were the first releases in TSR's Monstrous Arcana series, which detailed the most popular AD&D monsters.

== Reception ==
David Comford reviewed Eye of Pain for Arcane magazine, rating it a 3 out of 10 overall. While he praised I, Tyrant, he said that "Eye of Pain is a different story altogether." While he felt that it "start promisingly enough" with the pair of "well-crafted maps" on the inside front cover, he felt that the adventure itself was "lacklustre and unfortunately screams of being rushed to coincide with the release of I, Tyrant". He went on to say that the adventure was "extremely linear, lacking any semblance of urgency, and relies on powerful monsters to test players and form some sort of excitement. The suggested encounters exhibit little more thought - all have tenuous links and are never developed." He did note that the arrival of a rival adventure group and a "barely seen" mysterious guild member looking for a missing comrade "are good ideas, but are never realised and hardly intrude upon the player's actions". He continued with his criticism: "To exemplify the poor quality of the finish, a narrative is left with its concluding sentence trailing away to be guessed at. Later, a mysterious bust found in a woodland clearing is described as having a beard and moustache - then, on the opposite page, a clean shaven sculpted head is shown!" Comford concluded the review by saying: "Good idea, but badly executed. Let's hope the others in the trilogy get better."
