= The Forgotten King =

Dungeons & Dragons adventure module

- Code: RPGA3
- Authors: Bob Blake
- First published: 1983

The Forgotten King is an adventure module published in 1983 for the Advanced Dungeons & Dragons fantasy role-playing game.

== Plot summary ==
The Forgotten King consists of two short wilderness adventure scenarios, in which the player characters must discover the Wheel of time of the ancient druids, and obtain the keys to the forgotten king's tomb from the ruthless Krell, so that they may rescue the kingdom of Pellham.

== Publication history ==
RPGA3 The Forgotten King was written by Bob Blake, with art by Timothy Truman, and was published by TSR/RPGA in 1983 as a 16-page booklet with an outer folder. The module was a limited edition, sold only to members of the RPGA.
