= Dale Henson =

American game designer

- Other name: Slade Henson
- Occupation: Game designer

Dale "slade" Henson is a game designer who has worked primarily on role-playing games.

== Career ==
When the Spelljammer line ended, slade had idea of building a new setting from the original Manual of the Planes (1987) by Jeff Grubb, and a year later David Cook revisited the idea and developed Planescape (1993) as a result.

Henson's D&D design work included Monstrous Compendium Spelljammer Appendix (1990), Realmspace (1991), Monstrous Compendium Forgotten Realms Appendix II (1991), Howl From the North (1991), Book of Crypts (1991), Unsung Heroes (1992), The Magic Encyclopedia (1992), The Knight of Newts (1993), Blood Enemies: Abominations of Cerilia (1995), and Netheril: Empire of Magic (1996).

Henson also did significant work on TSR's Buck Rogers XXVC role-playing game, including the supplements Earth is the 25th Century (1990), Hardware (1992), and particularly No Humans Allowed (1992).
