= Cleric's Challenge =

Dungeons & Dragons adventure module

- Author: L. Richard Baker III
- Genre: Role-playing games
- Publisher: TSR
- Publication date: 1993
- Followed by: Cleric's Challenge II

Cleric's Challenge is a 1993 adventure by L. Richard Baker III for the 2nd edition of the Advanced Dungeons & Dragons fantasy role-playing game, published by TSR in their One-On-One series.

== Contents ==
The module is primarily designed for a priest or cleric of levels 2 to 4.

== Reception ==
Keith H. Eisenbeis reviewed Cleric's Challenge in a 1994 issue of White Wolf. On a scale of 1 to 5, he rated the module a 2 for Complexity and Value, a 3 for Appearance and Concepts, and a 4 for Playability. He stated, "All-in-all, this is a good adventure, and it should be valuable to players of priest characters." Overall, Eisenbeis rated it a 3 out of 5.
