= Sword and Shield =

Dungeons & Dragons adventure module

- Authors: John Terra
- First published: 1992

Sword and Shield is an adventure module published in 1992 for the Dungeons & Dragons fantasy role-playing game.

== Plot summary ==
Sword and Shield features a confrontation with the mysterious Black Knight.

== Publication history ==
Sword and Shield was written by John Terra, and published by TSR, Inc.

== Reception ==
Rick Swan reviewed Sword and Shield for Dragon magazine #191 (March 1993). He reviewed the adventure Quest for the Silver Sword in the same column, and felt that these two introductory adventures typify the "easy-on-the-brain" revised Dungeons & Dragons game, as each of them "boasts clutter-free story lines, maps that double as game boards, and colorful sheets of punch-out counters that makes playing a breeze". He felt that Sword and Shield "delivers the goods for players with a tad more experience" when compared with Quest for the Silver Sword, which was geared more towards beginners. Swan commented: "Game snobs may sneer at the meager plots and superficial characters - these are, after all, little more than glorified dungeon crawls - but the nasty monsters and gaudy treasures are guaranteed to dazzle novices. Weary Dungeon Masters can run either adventure almost effortlessly; I didn't even have to read them first."
