= Fighter's Challenge =

- Code: HHQ1
- First published: 1992

Fighter's Challenge is a 1992 adventure by John Terra for the 2nd edition of the Advanced Dungeons & Dragons fantasy role-playing game, published by TSR in their One-On-One series. The sequel Fighter's Challenge II by Drew Bittner appeared in 1994.

== Contents ==
The module is designed for one to three players, generally of a single warrior class of levels 2–4, although multiple-class player characters are allowed.

== Reception ==
Keith H. Eisenbeis reviewed the module in the March–April 1993 issue of White Wolf Magazine. He noted problems such as difficult encounters and an overabundance of treasure and magic items in the module, but concluded that it "is a well-written adventure that keeps the mystery, surprises and action at a high level and should be an enjoyable experience for both player and [Dungeon Master]". Eisenbeis rated it an overall 3 out of a possible 5.
