= Lankhmar – City of Adventure =

Tabletop role-playing game accessory by Douglas Niles

- Author: Bruce Nesmith, Douglas Niles, and Ken Rolston
- Genre: Role-playing game
- Publisher: TSR
- Publication date: 1985

Lankhmar – City of Adventure is an accessory for the Dungeons & Dragons fantasy role-playing game, first published by TSR in 1985.

== Contents ==
Lankhmar – City of Adventure is a two-booklet set which details Nehwon as well as the city of Lankhmar, from the Fafhrd and the Grey Mouser novel series by Fritz Leiber. It contains information about the city and its districts, factions and guilds, major characters, and the Nehwon gods and monsters, as well as encounter tables and adventure ideas.

The larger book begins by detailing summaries of the stories in the Fafhrd and the Grey Mouser series, with discussion on the potential of these stories for further adventures. Next is a district-by-district breakdown of Lankhmar, including maps in detail that mark and describe 99 locations, as well as record sheets for the Dungeon Master (DM) to record campaign notes. Another annotated map details the world of Nehwon, followed by descriptions of almost 100 non-player characters (NPCs), including statistics for Fafhrd and the Grey Mouser in the format of the book Legends & Lore, as well as the gods and monsters of Nehwon, adding to what already appears in Legends & Lore.

The book goes on to detail the political factions, guilds, and religions of the city, as well as a chapter on how to adventure in Lankhmar with rules on haggling, bribery, its legal system, and Social Levels. There is also a section on generating both NPCs and new buildings, with sample building plans. The book also includes a series of conversion rules for fitting the setting into the AD&D game system. A series of set-piece encounters is included to represent random incidents, or even starting points for further adventures, as well as a scenario for 9th-12th level characters titled "The Karvian Elephant".

The color map includes some areas in grey, allowing the DM to design them. The map of Lankhmar shows roads and alleys stretching around the houses of the crowded city; the middle portion of each city block has a large blank area to represent the narrow city backstreets that passers-by would have no knowledge about. Player characters (PCs) would only become aware of these areas after they move away from the main streets of Lankhmar to enter its the inner areas.

The smaller booklet contains a series of city block geomorphs which can also be used to fill in the blank grey areas on the map. Any time the PCs go into the backstreets, the GM chooses from one of 12 geomorphs to fill in the empty map area, and each geomorph will display the layout of the backstreets buildings. The smaller booklet also includes record sheets, duplicate maps, and information intended for players.

== Publication history ==
Lankhmar – City of Adventure was designed by Bruce Nesmith, Douglas Niles, and Ken Rolston, with a cover by Keith Parkinson and interior illustrations by Jeff Easley, and was first published by TSR for the Advanced Dungeons & Dragons game system in 1985 as a 96-page book with a back pocket on the back cover, a 32-page districts book with record sheets, handouts for players, and pre-generated player characters from the novels, and a full-color poster-size map showing the city of Lankhmar. Additional research was by Steve Mecca, and editing was by Anne Gray McCready and Barbara Green Deer. The set was updated in 1993 under the same name for use with second edition Advanced Dungeons & Dragons.

== Reception ==
In Issue 76 of White Dwarf, Graeme Davis called this "a valuable addition to the AD&D game rules", and noted that the sample building plans were "useful in any context — Lankhmar or otherwise". Davis was concerned whether the AD&D game system "could fit a pre-existing, detailed fictional setting without the obvious strain that showed in the Conan AD&D modules", but said the chapter on conversion rules eased his fears, continuing: "There is a little spanner-work necessary, especially with spellcasters, but the adjustments work surprisingly well once you get used to them, and little or none of the flavour of the original setting is lost". He called the adjustments in the accessory "forgivable" and "necessary" and the color map "a thing of beauty". Graeme concluded by giving this book an excellent rating of 10 out of 10, calling it "a deligh ... simply the best city module ever to see print."

In Issue 38 of Abyss, although Eric Olson accused Fritz Leiber of selling out to TSR, he did admit "This game aid is very detailed and professionally done ... If you are a Leiber buff, you will enjoy this simply as a reference publication." Olson concluded, "If you need a ready made city that is several notches above the old Judges Guild city products, you might want to give Lankhmar a try."

In Dragon #136, Jim Bambra felt that the set described "a city that is full of atmosphere and has a distinctive character", but cautioned that "Lankhmar's character is also one of its weaknesses, as the city is very closely tied to the world and characters created by novelist Fritz Leiber", which would make it hard to fit this supplement into a more conventional AD&D game setting." Bambra thought that the writers had done an excellent job, saying "The supplement's designers have done an excellent job of capturing the atmosphere of the city; you can almost smell the smoke and stench as you read through the supplement's main book". Bambra questioned whether this book was useful, since it would not be easy to shoehorn into a non-Lankkhmar campaign setting, and called it, "an inspirational reference work rather than a living and breathing city. This is, of course, unless you're a big Leiber fan who enjoys thief- and fighter-oriented adventures; in this case, Lankhmar is a dream come true".

In the October 1988 edition of Games International, James Wallis called this "a carefully compiled description of a metropolis with its roots firmly in traditional fantasy". Wallis found that "the design of the city is well executed if a little blocky and monotonous, and the map contains a reasonable layout coupled with areas for the referee to insert their own ideas and creations". However, Wallis didn't like the scenario ideas, commenting "the ideas are pitifully short and the two scenario packs that followed simply didn't come up to scratch". Wallis concluded: "All the same, this is an excellent basic package with a good overall feel, enjoyable for Leiber fans and non-fans alike".

Lawrence Schick, in his 1991 book Heroic Worlds, calls the set "easily one of the best campaign settings for AD&D, it's designed so that each GM who uses it will create an individualized Lankhmar by selecting detail maps and locations to suit".

In his 2023 book Monsters, Aliens, and Holes in the Ground, RPG historian Stu Horvath noted, "The book, which is relatively brief at 96 pages, crams an astonishing amount of detail from Leiber's stories ... In all, it is a vivid recreation of Leiber's source material."

In a review of Lankhmar, City of Adventure in Black Gate, Jeffrey Talanian said "Lankhmar, City of Adventure has been a resource that I've used for decades. I've referenced it for city play while gaming with my friends, and I've used it as a template to create unique city encounters, factions, guilds, and religions in professional work I've done. It is a bona-fide inspiration!"

== Reviews ==
- Casus Belli #29
- Coleção Dragão Brasil
