= Dungeons & Dragons Immortals Rules =

Tabletop role-playing game supplement for Dungeons & Dragons

- Author: Frank Mentzer
- Genre: Role-playing game
- Publisher: TSR
- Publication date: 1986

Dungeons & Dragons Immortals Rules, written by Frank Mentzer, is a boxed set for the Dungeons & Dragons (D&D) fantasy role-playing game first published by TSR in 1986 as an expansion to the Basic Set.

== Publication history ==
The Dungeons & Dragons Basic Set was revised in 1983 by Frank Mentzer as Dungeons & Dragons Set 1: Basic Rules. Between 1983 and 1985, the system was revised and expanded by Mentzer as a series of five boxed sets, including: the Basic Rules (supporting character levels 1–3), Expert Rules (supporting levels 4–14), Companion Rules (supporting levels 15–25), Master Rules (supporting levels 26–36), and Immortals Rules (supporting Immortals—characters who had transcended levels).

The Immortals Rules set contains two booklets: one is fifty-two pages long and the other is thirty-two pages. The booklets, Player's Guide to Immortals and DM's Guide to Immortals, were written by Frank Mentzer and edited by Anne Gray McCready, with cover artwork by Larry Elmore, and interior illustrations by Elmore and Jeff Easley. Harold Johnson also had a role in editing and development.

== Contents ==
Immortals Rules is a supplement intended for player characters after successfully completing the requirements for achieving immortality as detailed in the Master Rules. This set adds a system in which characters that attain immortality exchange all of their experience points for power points at a rate of ten thousand to one. Players can spend these power points to permanently increase attribute scores, and to use a magic point system to give the character new special abilities. Immortals advance in ranks instead of levels; a character must keep enough power points to maintain a rank, and will need to compete in the Olympics to get promoted to the next rank. The combat and magic systems have been modified to account for Immortal powers. Each Immortal player character has an abundance of powers, literally able to cast any magic spell in addition to new combat abilities. The rules detail playing transhuman Immortal characters, and cover their powers, artifacts, and relationships with each other, as well as their ability to construct their own personal "home planes". The set also presents powerful new monsters, and suggestions for adventure scenarios.

The set describes the history of Immortals within the D&D game: once there were only three Immortals, who discovered the multiverse, and decided to give it order and purpose. This set expands the D&D multiverse system, with an Astral Plane that permeates and connects the whole of the multiverse. In addition to the Astral Plane, there are also the Prime Material Plane, elemental planes, the Ethereal Planes, and many outer planes; these outer planes range from mono-spatial atto-planes (about 1/3" big) to penta-spatial tera-planes (about 851 billion light-years big). The set provides notes for the Dungeon Master (DM) concerning running campaigns for Immortal characters, including their goals where they fit into Immortal society, including duties and responsibilities. The DM plays the roles of the Hierarchs of the spheres, who are the superiors of the Immortal player characters. The set also presents sample plots intended to be used for Immortal adventures, and twenty-two pages of game statistics for monsters including the demons which originally appeared in Eldritch Wizardry.

== Reception ==
The Immortals Rules was reviewed by Graeme Davis in issue No. 83 of White Dwarf magazine, who referred to this set as "the culmination of the D&D game system". Davis found the set interesting, although he could not imagine actually playing it.

Lawrence Schick, in his 1991 book Heroic Worlds, felt that "Play using the Immortals rules is so different from low-level D&D as to be almost another game entirely."

== Reviews ==
- Casus Belli #36 (Feb 1987)
