= Wrath of the Minotaur =

Fantasy role-playing adventure

Wrath of the Minotaur, subtitled "An Underground Adventure for Starting DMs", is a fantasy role-playing game adventure published by TSR in 1999, designed to introduce new players to the rules of the second edition of Advanced Dungeons & Dragons (AD&D).

== Description ==
Wrath of the Minotaur is a "Fast Play" product that includes two scenarios:

- "The Ruined Tower": A very basic adventure that is designed to teach the rules of movement and combat. Four pregenerated characters are provided. Although the second edition rules of AD&D are used, players do not have to make any calculations. Instead, the calculations are written into the adventure. For example, players using the character Darkblade, a fighter, do not have to calculate how his Strength affects his combat abilities; instead, they are told to add an extra point of damage during combat. Likewise, the concept of THAC0 is not explained; during combat with an animated skeleton, players are simply told that Darkblade needs to roll an 11 or better to hit it.
- "Alaxus's Tomb": Although still basic, more rules are introduced, including initiative, THAC0, armor class, and thief talents. Four more pregenerated characters are provided.

By the end of both scenarios, the new players should have a firm enough grasp of the rules that they could continue to play AD&D as long as they bought the core rulebooks.

== Publication history ==
In 1997, TSR was taken over by Wizards of the Coast (WotC), but the new owners kept the TSR imprint for work related to the second edition of AD&D. Two years later, realizing that the complex rules of the second edition were a barrier to new players, the company released a number of "Fast Play" games that offered to let new players sit down and begin a game immediately. One of those products was Wrath of the Minotaur, designed by Jeff Grubb and published in 1999 with art by Gerald Brom, Clyde Caldwell, Ned Dameron, Jeff Easley, Jennell Jaquays, (Note: Credited as Paul Jaquays.) Keith Parkinson and Christopher Perkins.

While Wrath of the Minotaur was being developed as part of an effort to attract new players to the second edition of AD&D, the work was ultimately in vain — WotC had already started to design a third edition. Wrath of the Minotaur was one of the final second edition products, as well as one of the final products published under the TSR imprint. A few months later, WotC introduced the third edition of D&D under their own trademark, making all second-edition material, including Wrath of the Minotaur, obsolete.

== Reception ==
The German RPG magazine Envoyer was not impressed by this adventure, pointing out that there were no AD&D rules included in this product, so players would have to buy a set of rules after finishing this adventure, writing "I personally think that asking for extra money for this is simply outrageous; the role-playing hobby is expensive enough." The reviewer ended by giving this adventure a grade of D, calling it "Overpriced, unnecessary!"

In Issue 14 of the French games magazine Backstab, Michaël Croitoriu thought this was an excellent product to introduce younger players to the game, noting "The (first) adventure is short (less than two hours of play) and not very dangerous (you cannot die). To facilitate the task of the GM, all the important scores have been precalculated, the players simply roll the dice and the GM determines the results of their actions." Croitoriu concluded by giving this product a rating of 7 out of 10, saying, "Despite the poverty of the plot, these two adventures constitute an excellent introduction to D&D for a young audience."

In the May 1999 edition of InQuest Gamer, Todd Posey called this "a great introduction to the roleplaying. It jumps into the action without wasting too much time on rules and teaches players the hazards of dungeons without killing their characters." However Posey did not like the lack of an index or appendix, pointing out "you have to flip through the pages for rules or definitions you may have forgotten." Despite this, Posey concluded by giving Wrath of the Minotaur a grade of A−, saying "one of the best intro adventures to fantasy roleplaying ever. Yes, there are flaws, but the bottom line is that beginners can both run and play in this adventure. Few books accomplish this and, none do so at the incredible price point of five bucks. If you're new to roleplaying, buy this book. Heck, at this price, buy it even if you're only curious."

In Issue 119 of the French games magazine Casus Belli, Pierre Rosenthal noted "For anyone who has already done role-playing games, there will be little interest, but for a fan of Baldur's Gate or 'adventure gamebooks in which you are the hero' who wants to move on to 'tabletop gaming', it is very well done." Writing to his French audience, Rosenthal concluded, "If you speak English and are willing to make a big effort in translating, I cannot recommend these two adventures highly enough to bring curious minds to role-playing."

== Other recognition ==
A copy of Wrath of the Minotaur is held in the collection of the Strong National Museum of Play (object 110.2056).
