= Firefight: Modern U.S. and Soviet Small Unit Tactics =

Tactical wargame

"Soapbox" edition, cover art by Redmond Simonsen, 1976

Firefight: Modern U.S. and Soviet Small Unit Tactics is a tactical wargame originally published by Simulations Publications, Inc. (SPI) in 1976 that hypothesizes combat between small units of American and Soviet forces in West Germany in the 1970s.

== Description ==
Firefight is a two-man wargame in which Soviet ground forces have invaded West Germany and are opposed by American units. The game uses American and Soviet small unit tactics and weapons that were current in the mid-1970s. The rules are complex, and the game uses three graduated levels of modular rules and scenarios (Firefight I, Firefight II, and Firefight III) so that players can gradually learn how to play.

The combat is on a very small scale, with each hex scaled to 50 m (54 yd), while counters represent a two- to four-person fire team or a vehicle.

=== Scenarios ===
There are five scenarios included with the game for Firefight I and Firefight II, and another four scenarios for Firefight III. All of them involve an incursion into West Germany by units of the Warsaw Pact, which are then opposed by American units.

=== Components ===
The game is packaged in either a clear plastic flat box that incorporates counter trays, or a large cardboard "soapbox". Both boxes include:

- Two 22” x 34” hex grid paper maps scaled to 50 m (54 yd) per hex. When joined together, the entire map spans about 3 km (1.9 mi), with terrain similar to the eastern part of West Germany.
- 400 double-sided ½" die-cut counters
- 20-page rulebook
- 20-page reference data booklet
- two six-sided dice

=== Gameplay ===
At the start of each turn, the players roll a die to see who moves first. Each player, in turn, has five phases:

1. Direct Fire Phase
2. Movement Phase
3. Suppression Marker Removal Phase
4. Indirect Fire Phase

In most cases, a unit may either fire or move, but cannot do both.

== Publication history ==
In the mid-1970s, SPI was commissioned by the U.S. Army to develop small-unit training materials for soldiers assigned to Europe during the Cold War.

That material was then converted to a commercial product, designed by Jim Dunnigan with cover and interior art by Redmond Simonsen, and was published by SPI in 1976 as Firefight. A number of errors and ambiguous rules were discovered after publication, and an errata sheet was added to the game after August 1976. Even before it was published, pre-orders lifted Firefight to the top of SPI's sales list in the summer of 1976. Once released, it stayed in SPI's Top 10 sales list for eight months.

When TSR took over SPI in 1983, it sought to get an immediate return on its money by both immediately releasing several SPI titles that had been almost ready for publication such as Battle Over Britain and A Gleam of Bayonets: The Battle of Antietam, and by re-printing a number of popular SPI titles, including Blue & Gray: Four American Civil War Battles and Firefight.

In the 1990s, Decision Games acquired the license for Firefight and published a revised edition.

== Reception ==
In Issue 12 of Perfidious Albion, Charles Vasey and Geoff Barnard compared notes about the game. Vasey commented, "The game is very simple but very cleanly designed. It's really for the novice and even an fairly experienced player will find it is lacking in certain areas ... There is no command control at all ... Tanks charge around with complete knowledge pf the situation... The range of counters is small, but the system is not really one that can take too many units." Barnard noted, "For anyone who has player Tank! or Tobruk this game will be a step back in terms of tactical details, and for anyone why plays Mech War '77 it will be a step back in terms of unit variety." Vasey concluded, "Granted that its [tactical] scale is one of my favourites, I found the whole thing a bit of a let-down and at the new price [£7.75], I would not advise it for any [Perfidious Albion] reader who is neither a novice or a really keen student of the period." Barnard concluded, "The real pity is that it will be very difficult to add extra units to the game — you've rather got to take it or leave it."

In Issue 15 of the British wargame magazine Perfidious Albion, Andrew Grainger thought the game was "extremely well presented," but "as a miniatures player I thought that this was not as good as a miniatures game on the same subject." Despite this, Grainger concluded that this game "must rank as one of SPI's best. The ability of the rules to get one playing a scenario so quickly is excellent and it is hoped that it will be possible to introduce this feature on other games."

In his 1977 book The Comprehensive Guide to Board Wargaming, Nicholas Palmer noted the "unusually detailed rules, with particular care taken to see that beginners can follow them." He concluded that the game was "Relatively elementary for a tactical game, with such questions as morale and intelligence omitted and a limited range of vehicles, but most impressive within its scope and particularly suitable for beginners interested in modern tactical warfare but anxious to avoid excessive complication."

In Issue 15 of Imagine, Roger Musson pointed out that the rules were actually relatively simple, and the graduated approach to rules complexity aided in learning how to play. He noted that "The main premise of the game is, 'if you can see it, you can hit it, and if you can hit it, you can kill it' — the casualty rate is very high." He concluded with a strong recommendation, saying, "To sum up, this is an enjoyable game, playable in an evening [...] for the less experienced gamer with an interest in this [...] subject of US/ Soviet conflict, Firefight can be strongly recommended."

In Issue 11 of Phoenix, Mike Doe compared the board wargame Firefight to general miniatures wargaming. He noted that "The indirect fire system in Firefight is highly detailed and is quite the best system for off table fire I have seen." However, Doe didn't like the complete absence of morale (panic) rules, which he thought were a necessary part of wargaming.

In The Complete Book of Wargames, Jon Freeman was considerably less enthusiastic about the game. He allowed that it was "an extremely professional, accurate, and well-laid-out piece of work." But due to its first purpose as a simulation developed for Army trainees, he felt that it was "a learning device – not a game [...] the aim of the system was realism, not playability." He found the scenarios "rather wooden and one-dimensional." He concluded, "FireFight is possibly the most tedious game on the market [...] If enjoyment is a consideration in your game playing, pass this by."

In The Guide to Simulations/Games for Education and Training, Martin Campion noted that despite the game's complexity, "Well-developed combat charts make combat easier to figure out than is normal in games at this scale." However, Campion, a history professor writing about how this game could be adapted to the history classroom, concluded that the game's very contemporary nature worked against it for this purpose, saying, "Since it is not a historical game, my interest in it is slight."

In a retrospective review in Issue 13 of The Journal of 20th Century Wargaming, Marion Bates noted, "The rules are rather well done ... Thus a gamer gets a gradual introduction in small portions." However, Bates listed various problems: "The scenarios are ridiculous. Units are chosen at random, and the Soviet player is compelled to rigidly apply tactical doctrine no matter what situation presents itself. The scenario results are one-sided and just plain dull; the combat system itself is lackluster and devoid of the kind of detail that might create interest." Bates concluded, "Firefight is an exciting name for an incredibly boring game."

== Awards ==
- At the 1977 Origins Awards, Firefight was a finalist for a Charles S. Roberts Award in the category "Best Tactical Game of 1976".

== Other reviews ==
- Fire & Movement #5 and #15
- The Wargamer Vol.1 #9, and Vol.1 #32
- Campaign #92 and #95
- JagdPanther #15
- Journal of Twentieth Century Wargaming #13
- Ann Arbor Wargamer #12
- Games & Puzzles #58
