= PartyZone: Spy Ring =

1985 party game

- Designers: Zeb Cook
- Publishers: TSR
- Publication: 1985
- Genres: Party game

PartyZone: Spy Ring is a party game published by TSR in 1985 in which all invitees to a party pretend to be spies on a mission.

== Description ==
PartyZone: Spy Ring is an espionage party game for up to 12 guests that resembles, in scope, the popular murder mystery party game genre.

=== Components ===
The game box contains:

- 12 preprinted invitations and envelopes
- Identification badges
- PartyZone napkins
- Agent passports
- Trivia puzzle sheet booklet
- $2950 in game money
- Operations manual for host
- Party planner for host

=== Gameplay ===
PartyZone: Spy Ring is designed to be played at a party to which twelve people have been invited. The host sends out invitations to guests that contain the guest's spy identity, a secret mission to fulfil, and a password. The game posits that there are three teams of spies socializing at the party (CIA, KGB and China). Guests take on the persona of their character, and use their password to identify other spies on their team. Each spy tries to figure out how to perform their given mission by socializing with the other spies.

== Publication history ==
TSR was widely known for its fantasy role-playing game Dungeons & Dragons, first published in 1974. By the mid-1980s, despite a decade of success with D&D, the company was looking to diversify its product line and widen its audience base by publishing family board games such as All My Children and Crosscheck, as well as a line of PartyZone games based on the popular murder mystery party game. The first of these was PartyZone: Spy Ring, designed by Zeb Cook and released by TSR in 1985. The company published two other PartyZone games: The Inheritance (1985) and Knave of Hearts (1986).

== Reception ==
Dave Nalle, writing in Abyss, called this "basically a good idea, but the mystery idea has been handled much better in other games." Nalle questioned the utility of the game, pointing out that the party host could organize such an evening without purchasing "this expensive package." Nalle also felt that the tone of the game, with its "unnecessary and rather tacky props", was too childish to be seriously considered as an adult party game. Nalle concluded, "I certainly would not want to be seen playing this by anyone who I wanted to respect me afterwards."

Michael Dobson, in an article titled "Bad idea, good game?", commented "PartyZone is a new approach to roleplaying; with no dice, no combat system, and no pretend violence ... it is stretching the limits of the [game industry] field by trying something new, different, and a little radical." Dobson concluded, "I've always felt that the fun part to play in a solve-a-murder party is that of the murderer, because the murderer gets to lie and cheat and try to confuse people, while the other participants have to play it straight. But in Spy Ring, everybody's got a secret, so everyone gets to lie and cheat and obfuscate."

Games included PartyZone: Spy Ring in their Top 100 Games of 1985, noting, "This unusual party game can be played throughout the evening without interfering with other activities."
