= Revolt On Antares =

Intergalactic assassin Corvus Andromeda on the cover of TSR's Revolt On Antares microgame

Revolt On Antares is a science fiction themed microgame designed by Tom Moldvay and produced by TSR, Inc. in 1981. Similar to the microgames produced by Steve Jackson Games, it was sold in a transparent plastic shell case and came with rulebook, full-color hex-map, counters, and one six-sided die. Other games in this series (called "minigames" by TSR) include They've Invaded Pleasantville!, Remember the Alamo, Attack Force, Vampyre, Viking Gods, Icebergs and Saga.

The action of the game takes place on Imhirrhos, the ninth planet in the Antares system. Two to four players assume the roles of leaders of different factions fighting for control of the planet as the influence of Earth's Imperial Terran Empire begins to weaken. The factions include seven different ruling families or houses, Terran Empire forces, natives, and alien Silakkans. Players can choose from one of three different game scenarios.

== House Leaders ==
Each of the seven houses has a leader with varying numbers of forces to command such as Hovercraft, Jump Troops, Laser Tanks, and Power Infantry as well as one Artifact (see below). Each leader also possesses a special ability.

- House Braganza, led by Catherine "the Mad" Braganza who can summon lightning
- House Edistyn, led by Nureb Khan Edistyn who has the power of precognition
- House Fitzgerald, led by Simon Fitzgerald who can create morale-boosting ion waves
- House Kinrabe, led by Barracuda Kinrabe, an illusionist
- House Mackenzie, led by Black Dougal Mackenzie who can teleport
- House Orsini, led by Messalina Orsini who has the power of fascination
- House Sessedi, led by Ariton Sessedi, a telepath

== Galactic Heroes ==
If a house leader is killed during combat, the player has the opportunity to recruit a Galactic Hero to replace him. Like house leaders, Galactic Heroes also have special powers or lead additional forces.

- Andros, an alien android who can summon a "Phantom Regiment"
- Corvus Andromeda, an intergalactic assassin
- Doctor Death, a criminal who has the power to create an army of zombies
- Emerald Eridani, the commander of the Emerald Company laser tank battalion
- The Iron General, the cyborg leader of a group of mercenary laser tanks
- Lyra Starfire, a scantily clad adventuress and commander of an airjet squadron
- The Nullspace Kid, a young adventurer and airjet squadron pilot
- Skarn 3, an alien mercenary who commands a band of jump troops
- Subadai O'Reilly, the commander of "O'Reilly's Raiders," a power infantry battalion
- Tovan Palequire, an intergalactic smuggler and arms dealer

== Other Factions ==
In addition to the seven house leaders there are three other power groups that may or may not come into play depending on the game scenario.

- Ward Serpentine, leader of the Terrans
- Mirrhos, leader of the natives
- Magron, leader of the alien Silakkans

== Artifacts ==
Each house has possession of a special alien artifact, chosen at random at the beginning of the game.

- Devastator
- Dimensional Plane
- Energy Drainer
- Field Generator
- Force Cannon
- Sonic Imploder
- UFO

== Scenarios and Gameplay ==
Revolt on Antares has three different game scenarios: Revolt Against Terra (the basic game), The Silakka Invasion, and Power Politics on Imirrhos.

- In Revolt Against Terra, the game is played over the course of ten turns. Each turn consists of ten ordered phases where players take actions such as movement, combat, recruitment, and forging alliances. The player with the greatest number of victory points at the end of ten turns wins the game. Victory points are earned for owning or capturing different economic zones and for owned or captured house fortresses.
- The Silakka Invasion
- Power Politics on Imirrhos

== Reception ==
William A. Barton reviewed Revolt On Antares in The Space Gamer No. 44. Barton commented that "Although Revolt On Antares isn't overly exciting, it can be an interesting little game to play, especially if you like the smaller games with an SF (make that science fantasy) flavor."

Duke Ritenhouse commented in a 1998 article that "The big red dragon from Lake Geneva even got into the act by 1981, taking time out from counting its Advanced Dungeons & Dragons profits to release a series of mini games that came in ridiculous unwieldy, clear plastic cases. Anyone remember They've invaded Pleasantville? Revolt on Antares? Vampyre? For that matter, does anyone remember Remember the Alamo?"

In a retrospective review of Revolt On Antares in Black Gate, Ty Johnston said "Remembered fondly today by many old-school players, Revolt on Antares has become something of a collector's piece, often selling for nearly a hundred U.S. dollars on various online sites. Is it worth it? Perhaps, especially to those of us who warmly recall it as a part of our childhood."

== Reviews ==
- Asimov's Science Fiction v7 n3 (1983 03)
