= Europe Aflame =

Board wargame pub lished in 1989

Europe Aflame is a board wargame published by TSR in 1989 that simulates the European and Middle East theatres of World War II.

== Description ==
Europe Aflame is a two-player game with Europe, North Africa and the Middle East represented on the board. One player is the Axis commander while the other player is the Allied commander.

The game uses a "fog of war" strategy to prevent the other player from seeing the exact strength of units arrayed before them. The cardboard counters are placed in plastic holders so that the owning player can see the front of the counter, while their opponent only sees the blank back of the counter.

Rather than using a hex grid, the map is divided into areas. To resolve combat, the attacker rolls a six-sided die. If the number rolled is equal or less than the defender unit's strength, that unit's strength is reduced by one.

The game includes rules for fortresses, amphibious invasions, naval transport, strategic movement, partisans, paratroops, U-Boat wolf packs, and lend-lease and non-aggression pacts. To add an element of randomness, the timing of the entry of the United States, the Soviet Union and Italy vary from game to game.

== Publication history ==
In the 1970s TSR was mainly known as the publisher of the fantasy role-playing game Dungeons & Dragons. With the takeover of Simulations Publications Inc. (SPI) in 1982, TSR entered the board wargame market, but just as the wargame market sagged, and TSR divested themselves of SPI's old assets and staff by 1985. TSR re-entered the wargame market in 1989 with The Hunt for Red October, a board game based on the Tom Clancy novel. This was a bestseller for TSR, and they decided to follow up the same year with Europe Aflame, a board wargame designed by David "Zeb" Cook. However, unlike The Hunt for Red October, this game failed to find an audience.

== Reception ==
In Issue 12 of Games International Martin Croft stated that "Europe Aflame is a good introductory level wargame which can also keep more advanced players busy for a while. Don't expect pin-point accuracy, just sit back and enjoy it." Croft concluded by giving the game 3 stars out of 5

The Wisconsin State Journal said that the game "crosses the line between traditional war game and old-fashioned boardgame successfully".

In Issue 63 of Fire & Movement, Ted Bleck was not sure this was a good game for beginners, saying, "If in fact Europe Aflame has been marketed with the newcomer in mind it misses the mark. The novice will find it time consuming to wade through the rules. Poor editing has created a certain vagueness, only adding to the level of frustration encountered" However, Beck felt that more experienced gamers would enjoy the game, commenting, "Once into the actual playing of the game, wargamers will not be disappointed. Europe Aflame is a step up in complexity. Every scenario presents plenty of variety to keep things interesting. More than enough surprises exist to keep the game exciting."

Several issue later, Terry Coleman noted that this game was "a throwback to TSR games of [the mid-eighties]. An inspired design has been followed with competent, not wholly complete development work. Once the players have gotten past the often vague rules and understand what the designer tried to simulate, the game is intriguing."

In a retrospective review in Issue 8 of Simulacrum, Joe Scoleri theorized that the game's poor popularity was because it was neither a game for beginners nor for experienced gamers. "Europe Aflame falls somewhere between the complexity of Third Reich and the wargame-lite of Axis & Allies. The game includes a great deal of chrome without the overwhelming complexity of weightier games on the subject. On the other hand, the rules are definitely a step above those found in [...] introductory games. Perhaps this middling complexity level kept the game from catching on."

== Reviews ==
- "The Year's Best Games" in Games #101
- Casus Belli #56
