= No Humans Allowed =

No Humans Allowed is a 1992 role-playing supplement for Buck Rogers XXVC published by TSR.

== Contents ==
No Humans Allowed is a supplement in which the creation of artificially created beings in the 25 century is explored.

== Reception ==
Steve Crow reviewed No Humans Allowed in White Wolf #33 (Sept./Oct., 1992), rating it a 2 out of 5 and stated that "Overall, I would recommend No Humans Allowed to the Buck Rogers gamemaster intent on furthering his knowledge of that game's universe. Enough of the information is redundant that it is easy to get along without it, so I cannot give it a strong recommendation."

== Reviews ==
- Papyrus (Issue 15 - Gencon 1994)
