= Escape from New York (disambiguation) =

Escape from New York is a 1981 post-apocalyptic action film directed by John Carpenter.

Escape from New York may also refer to:

- Escape from New York (game), a 1981 board game based on the film
- Escape from New York (soundtrack), the score of the film
- "Escape from New York" (Pretty Little Liars), an episode of the American TV series Pretty Little Liars
- Escape from New York, a 2009 live album by post-rock band 65daysofstatic
- Escape from New York (Beast Coast album), a 2019 album by hip hop collective Beast Coast
- Escape from New York Pizza, a pizzeria in Portland, Oregon

== See also ==
- Escape from L.A. (disambiguation)
