= Attack Force =

Attack Force may refer to:

- Attack Force (film), a 2006 action/thriller film, starring Steven Seagal
- Attack Force Z, a 1982 Australian World War II film, directed by Tim Burstall
- Attack Force (microgame), a 1982 board game from TSR
- Attack Force (video game), a 1980 computer game developed by Big Five Software
