= All My Children (game) =

1994 WWII board wargame

- Designers: Anne Gray
- Illustrators: Wayne McLoughlin
- Publishers: TSR
- Publication: 1985
- Genres: Family board game

All My Children is a board game published by TSR in 1985 that is based on the then-popular long-running American television soap opera of the same name.

== Description ==
All My Children is a board wargame for 2–6 players in which each player takes the part of one of the pivotal characters of the television show in 1985, seeking to capture goals in order to collect points.

=== Components ===
The game box includes

- a board
- a deck of "Action" cards divided into five suits: Red, Blue, Green, Pink and Purple.
- a deck of "Goal" cards with values ranging from 5 to 20. These are also divided into the same five suits as the Action deck.
- twelve character profile cards: Brooke English, Tad Martin, Palmer Cortlandt, Hilary Wilson, Dottie Thornton, Jesse Hubbard, Phoebe Tyler Wallingford, Daisy Cortlandt, Greg Nelson, Erica Kane, Angie Hubbard, and Adam Chandler
- twelve matching character tokens with plastic stands
- two six-sided dice

=== Set up ===
Each player selects a character from the stable of 12, and places the character's profile card in front of them. Both decks are shuffled together, and seven cards are dealt to each player. Each player, after reviewing their Goal cards, places their character's token on a Start space close to a desired location. More than one token can start on the same Start space.

=== Gameplay ===
Each player, in turn:

1. Rolls a die and moves the number of spaces indicated in any direction, but without touching the same space twice. The token must be moved the full amount of the die roll, unless it reaches one of the pictured destinations (Cortlandt Manor, The Chateau, WRCW Station, Wallingford Estate, Martin House, Glam-o-Rama, Hubbard House, Boutique, Pine Valley Hospital, Pine Valley University, Goal Post, Bank, Cortlandt Electronics, Tempo Magazine, Foxy's, Erica Kane's Penthouse) and enters it.
  1. If a character token ends its turn on the same space as another token, or a player has moved someone else's token to the same space as their token, the moving player may immediately steal a card from the owner of the other token.
2. Completes any instructions printed on the space landed on.
3. Plays a Goal Card: When a player reaches a desired location or ends their turn on the same space as a character mentioned in their Goal card, the player may play that Goal card face up.
  1. Anytime a Goal Card is played, all players, starting to the left of the active player, may play an Action Card of the same suit as the Goal card to attempt to capture it. Play continues around the table, with each player in turn given the opportunity either to play an Action card of the correct suit or to pass, including the active player who played the Goal card. This continues around the table any number of times until all player pass. The last Action card to have been played wins the Goal card. The winner places the Goal card in front of them and adds its value to their score.
  2. If a player wins a Goal card with the name of their own character on it, they are awarded double points.
4. If the active player played one or more a cards, the player draws enough cards from the deck to refill their hand back up to seven cards. If the player did not play a card, the player can discard a card from their hand and draw a new card.
  1. If another player used cards in an attempt to win a Goal card, they do not refill their hand immediately, but must wait until their turn.

Anytime during a player's turn, they can play a Locked Door card by placing it on any named location on the board. This location is then locked and unavailable to any other player until the active player's next turn.

=== Victory conditions ===
The first player to gain 100 points and then reach the All My Children space is the winner.

== Publication history ==
By the mid-1980s, TSR was widely known for its fantasy role-playing game Dungeons & Dragons, first published in 1974. A decade later, despite D&D's success, the company was looking to diversify its product line and widen its audience base by publishing family board games. The 1980s were considered the "golden age" for All My Children, an afternoon soap opera that had been airing on ABC since 1970. TSR acquired the license to produce a game based on the television show, and assigned Anne Gray, one of their editors, to design the game. The result was All My Children, which proved to be very popular, and went on to sell more than 150,000 copies.

== Reception ==
Dave Nalle, writing in Abyss, agreed that the game had high quality components, but held the game itself in contempt, declaring, "It follows in the tradition of the classic games based on Dallas and General Hospital, and makes a point about the banality of soap operas which can be reduced to spaces on a board and the venality of game manufacturers who will prostitute their skills to make a game like this one, which has nothing original or imaginative in it."

Michael Dobson, in an article titled "Bad idea, good game?", admitted that a game based on a soap opera seemed at first glance like a bad idea, but then wrote, "All My Children is actually a lot of fun, even if you aren't a soap-opera fan ...Although the mechanics of the game concentrate on card play, there is a spirit of role-playing the characters from the show that makes the game quite lively." Dobson concluded by pointing out, "The All My Children game has been mentioned in TV Guide, and the premier of the game (attended by the TV stars) was shown on Entertainment Tonight. It seems to be catching on, deservedly so."

But Rick Swan vehemently disagreed, calling it "The lamest game I ever played."

== Reviews ==
- Game News #10 (Dec., 1985)
