= Roy Young =

Roy Young may refer to:

- Roy A. Young (1882–1960), American banker; chairman of the Federal Reserve
- Roy V. Young, American fantasy writer
- Roy Young (American football) (1917–1987), American football player
- Roy Young (musician) (1934–2018), British rock and roll musician
- Roy Young (educator) (1921–2013), American scholar and academic administrator
