= Anne Gray McCready =

American game designer

- Born: Anne C. Gray; July 7, 1960 (age 66); Williams Bay, Wisconsin, United States
- Occupations: Game designer, editor
- Spouse: Benjamin McCready (1985-2023)
- Writing career
- Genre: Role-playing games

Anne C. Gray McCready (born July 7, 1960) is a game designer, writer and editor who worked on a number of products for the Dungeons & Dragons fantasy role-playing game published by TSR, as well as designing several board games for TSR. She later became a freelance writer and editor as well as manager of her husband Ben McCready's portrait business.

== Early life ==
Anne Gray was born in Williams Bay, Wisconsin and went to the University of Wisconsin–Whitewater. She majored in biology, then switched to marketing after a year, then switched to English the following year, earning her B.A. in English in 1982. Her first job was keylining ads, business cards, and menus for a printing company, where she also got interested in graphic design.

== TSR ==
Gray applied for a job with TSR in Lake Geneva, Wisconsin as an administrative assistant with the company's International Division, but was turned down. She kept in touch with TSR, and successfully applied for the position of copy editor. Gray was totally unfamiliar with TSR's flagship role-playing game Dungeons & Dragons, but rapidly had to familiarize herself, since her first copy-editing job was the revised edition of the D&D Basic Set. She later admitted, "I swear, I hardly knew what the D&D game was about ... and before I knew it, I was stuck with the job of editing boxed set after boxed set."

Gray was promoted to full editor after a year, and handled the D&D line and other projects. In 1984, TSR made the decision to diversify away from D&D by producing family board games. They acquired a license from the popular soap opera All My Children, and Gray was given the assignment of designing a game based on the TV show. It proved to be bestseller when the All My Children game sold 150,000 copies. Gray also created Crosscheck for TSR by combining Scrabble with crossword puzzles. It was not as big a hit as All My Children, but TSR licensed Datasoft to produce a computer game version that proved to be popular.

At the same time, just after Christmas 1984, Gray's mother convinced her to go on a blind date with Ben McCready, a portrait artist whose career was just starting to take off after several commissions by popular actors and American presidents. The couple were married the following summer, the week before Gencon 1985.

== Freelancer ==
After her son Bo was born in 1988, Anne and Ben made the decision that Whitewater, Wisconsin, where they had both gone to university, would be a good place to raise their child. Gray McCready stepped down from TSR and became a freelance editor and writer, as well as her husband's business manager.

They stayed in Whitewater until they son grew up and married, then followed Bo to DeForest, Wisconsin so they could be closer to Bo's family. Their final move was to Georgetown, Texas, where Ben died of metastatic melanoma on 10 July 2023, age 71.

== Works ==
Gray McCready worked as an editor on several Dungeons & Dragons game products from 1984-1986. She also did design and writing for D&D adventures such as Mystery of the Snow Pearls and Red Sonja Unconquered. Her editing work included products from the Greyhawk, Ravenloft, Dragonlance, Forgotten Realms, and Birthright product lines. She also designed the board games All My Children and Crosscheck.
