= Maxi Bour$e =

1987 board game

Maxi Bour$e is a 1987 board game published by TSR.

== Gameplay ==
Maxi Bour$e is a game in which a stock market board game has players trade shares in real-world corporations, navigating fluctuating prices and event cards to dominate industries or build diversified conglomerates.

== Reviews ==
- Casus Belli #43
- Jeux & Stratégie #49
- "The Year's Best Games" in Games #101

== See also ==
- Wall Street Spin
