= Mars in the 25th Century =

Mars in the 25th Century is a 1990 role-playing game supplement published by TSR for Buck Rogers XXVC.

== Contents ==
Mars in the 25th Century is a supplement in which a campaign setting explores the domain of the corrupt RAM oppressors.

== Publication history ==
Mars in the 25th Century was written by Ray Winninger and published by TSR in 1990 as a 64-page book with a large map and an outer folder.

== Reviews ==
- Papyrus (Issue 13 - Holiday 1993)
