= Legacy of Steel =

Legacy of Steel may refer to

- Legacy of Steel, a 1998 fantasy novel by Mary H. Herbert
- Legacy of Steel, an EverQuest guild
