= Benjamin McCready =

American painter

Benjamin Donald "Ben" McCready (born August 14, 1951-July 10, 2023) was an American portrait painter.

== Early life ==
Ben McCready was born in Ann Arbor, Michigan to Donald and Sally Wyman McCready, both trained artists. Ben's godfather was Bennie Oosterbaan, whom he was named after — his mother Sally had grown up as a next-door neighbor of Bennie and Delmas Oosterbaan, was a big sister to the Oosterbaan's son "Bennie Boy", and was devastated when the young boy died at age 8. When her own son was born in 1951, she named him Ben after the Oosterbaans' late son, and asked Bennie to be the godfather.

Sally, a talented artist who had painted portraits of Les Aspin and Dorothy Hamill, taught Ben the basics of portrait art, and he quickly showed talent. His father, a university professor, moved his family to several different cities, but finally settled in Whitewater, Wisconsin when Ben was 14. Ben attended Whitewater High School and University of Wisconsin, majoring in political science. However, he left school one credit shy of earning his bachelor's degree.

== Artist ==
After false starts as a political campaign worker, executive recruiter and insurance salesman, McCready decided to try portrait painting as a career in 1982, and set up a studio in Lake Geneva, Wisconsin. After a year of painting friends and family, either for free or for as little as $25, McCready tried to raise his profile by sending samples of his work to hockey player Wayne Gretzky, who then commissioned a portrait. As a result, McCready became the team artist for Gretzky's Edmonton Oilers hockey team from 1983 to 1990, during its run of five Stanley Cup championships.

McCready tried the same tactic of sending a sample to actor Robert Redford, and Redford also commissioned a portrait. In addition, Redford allowed McCready to use his portrait for publicity. Nancy Reagan, looking for a portrait of her husband Ronald Reagan for his Presidential Library, commissioned McCready on the condition that he wouldn't meet Ronald. McCready agreed and did the portrait from photographs.

These high-profile commissions did not result in a lot of new work, so McCready took the unusual step of running a two-thirds page advertisement in The Spiegel Catalog, which had a circulation of 50 million. The result was a flood of new commissions, and McCready's career took off. Years later in an interview, McCready said, "You've got to sell yourself. You can have the most incredible skills, but if you can't sell, it might be hard to sustain your career."

At the peak of his career, McCready received 100 requests annually and painted 20 portraits a year. He also created the cover art for the NHL All Star Game. By age 60, McCready slowed his output to one portrait a month.

During his professional career spanning 40 years, McCready painted more than 700 commissions. Notable portraits included:

American Politicians

- Gerald R. Ford
- Ronald W. Reagan
- George H. W. Bush
- James Earl Carter
- Howard Baker
- Robert Kastenmeier,

Actors

- Robert Redford
- Paul Newman
- George Clooney
- Kirk Douglas and his wife Anne Buydens

Athletes

- Lleyton Hewitt
- Wayne Gretzky

Corporate

- Mark McCormack
- J. Peter Grace
- John Dorrance

Academia

- Robben Fleming (President, University of Michigan),
- Derek Bok (President, Harvard University)
- Harlan Hatcher (President, University of Michigan)

== Personal life ==
In 1984, McCready went on a blind date with Ann Gray, a senior editor, writer and game designer working for TSR. They married in the summer of 1985, and a son, Bo, was born in 1988. Anne had also attended university in Ben's childhood home of Whitewater, and the couple decided that it would be a good place to raise Bo. They made the move after Anne left TSR to become a freelance editor/writer and Ben's business manager. The McCreadys lived in Whitewater for over 20 years before moving to DeForest, Wisconsin to be closer to their son's family. Their final move was to Georgetown, Texas, where McCready died of metastatic melanoma on 10 July 2023, age 71.

It's not a record of Ben McCready. I am leaving a record of people who were important in society. That's what I do. It's not about me and it never has been.

— Ben McCready
