= The Great Khan Game =

Board game by TSR

- Front cover of The Great Khan Game boxed set
- Genre: Role-playing game
- Publisher: TSR, Inc.
- Media type: Boxed set

The Great Khan Game is a fantasy board game that was published by TSR, Inc in 1989.

== Overview ==
The Great Khan Game is a game about acquiring countries, by gathering the various rulers and important people of the lands.

This card-and-board game humorously presents the epic sweep of politics, trade, and warfare, among budding fantasy empires. Peoples and rabble join with heroes and leaders to form nations intent on the economic, political, and military conquest of the known world.

The game is described in the sourcebook Forgotten Realms Adventures: "This is a whimsical board/card game of conquest and intrigue set in the Whamite Isles, several tiny specks of land in the Sea of Fallen Stars. Players try to direct the fortunes of nations to amass the most power before the Historian draws events to a close."

== Gameplay ==
Players gather melds (groups of cards representing leaders and peoples), into rich and powerful nations that vie for control of territories on a map. To win, a player must control the most territory and have the richest treasury at the end of the game. The game offers various ways to gain gold (trade with and conquest of other nations, for example) and to gain control of nations and territory, usually by war (battles between melds of cards representing nations) and political coups (in which a nation changes hands when a competitor plays a more powerful meld than the existing meld representing a given country). As players draw cards each turn, new leaders and peoples come into play and event cards signal disasters (assassins, rare diseases, earthquakes, and peasant revolts) and windfalls (trade caravans, fleets, and philanthropists) for the competing nations.

== Contents ==
The Great Khan Game is a folio boxed game with a 32-page rulebook, a game map, 162 playing cards and counters.

== Publication history ==
The game was designed and illustrated by Tom Wham with Richard Hamblen; the game map and playing cards were designed by Jeff Dee and Amanda Dee.

== Reception ==
In the July 1989 edition of Games International (Issue 7), James Wallis was a bit put off by the price, which was significantly more than TSR's previously published Tom Wham game, Mertwig's Maze. He found that The Great Khan Game was based on "a very simple and playable idea," but he felt that the basic idea had been lost because "the designers seem to have wanted to expand it into a wargame." He called the complex combat system with its numerous variables "a daft idea," and felt there were "other unnecessary twiddly bits which obstruct the game rather than adding to it." Wallis concluded by giving the game a below-average rating of 2 out of 5, saying "The Great Khan Game is [...] playable and perhaps enjoyable, but without question has a number of complex and unnecessary elements [...] By all means buy [it], especially if you're willing to do some work to unearth the good game that lies beneath, but as it stands, I cannot recommend it."

In the April 1991 edition of Dragon (Issue 168), Ken Rolston noted the game's "goofy, cheerful tone and play style" with "Vividly characterized fantasy peoples and rabble", noting that the game "neatly combines epic scale and mock-epic tone in simultaneously exploiting and parodying the most distinctive excesses of the grand-fantasy genre setting". He said the game "boasts Tom Wham's light touch, simple and readable rules, and a vivid, imaginative fantasy setting focusing on the personalities, virtues, and foibles of various creatures, heroes, and stooges". Rolston considered the game's artwork "spartan and modest", and called the illustrations "cute, lovable, and perfectly in keeping with the tone of the game". He noted that game "is sold unblushingly as an Advanced Dungeons & Dragons Forgotten Realms product, despite no discernible relationship to the AD&D game or the Realms. This lapse in marketing taste is excusable only because anyone who looks at the game box can tell immediately that its tone and style have nothing to do with either the Realms or the FRPG." Although he was confused by the rules from time to time, he found it to be "well play-tested", indicated by the thoughtful remarks on play within the rules. Rolston added, "the informal tone and style of rules writing invites you not to take the rules too seriously. Only someone who misunderstood the intent of a Tom Wham game could get involved in a rules squabble." He concluded the review by saying: "The Great Khan Game is a pleasant, light-hearted fantasy game with an excellent flavor and an enjoyable, pleasing play style. Its competitive, diplomatic elements are nicely balanced by a mock-epic tone, and the epic conflicts of fantasy kingdoms play out like a grand, profoundly cheesy fantasy novel."
