= Escape from L.A. (disambiguation) =

Escape from L.A. is a 1996 post-apocalyptic action film directed by John Carpenter.

Escape from L.A. or Escape from Los Angeles may also refer to:

- Escape from L.A. (film score), the score of the film
- "Escape from L.A." (BoJack Horseman), an episode of the American TV series BoJack Horseman
- Escape from LA (song), a song by the Weeknd
- Escape from Los Angeles (song), a song by AFI

== See also ==
- Escape from New York (disambiguation)
