= High Adventure Cliffhangers Buck Rogers Adventure Game =

Tabletop role-playing game

The High Adventure Cliffhangers Buck Rogers Adventure Game was a role-playing game published by TSR in 1993.

== Publication ==
Following lackluster response to the Buck Rogers Battle for the XXVth Century board game (1988), TSR decided to try again with a more conventional table-top RPG, this time based on the original 1928 Philip Francis Nowlan novel Armageddon, 2419 A.D. (Ace, Aug 1978, ISBN 0-441-02939-6) and subsequent 1929 comic strip continuity, in which resurgent tribal Americans overthrow their Red Mongol conquerors. The basic game was called the High Adventure Cliffhangers Buck Rogers Adventure Game (Sep 1993, ISBN 1-56076-636-0) and was co-designed by Jeff Grubb and Steven Schend. The sole supplement, the campaign-focused box set High Adventure Cliffhangers Buck Rogers War Against The Han Campaign Supplement (Dec 1993, ISBN 978-1-56076-683-4), was designed by Steven Schend alone.

This new Buck Rogers role-playing game was a return to the themes of the original Buck Rogers comic strips. This game included biplanes and interracial warfare, as opposed to the space combat of the earlier Buck Rogers XXVC game. There were only a few expansion modules created for High Adventure Cliffhangers. Shortly afterward, the game was discontinued, and the production of Buck Rogers games came to an end. This game was neither widely advertised nor very popular.

== Reception ==
Ken Cliffe reviewed The Buck Rogers Adventure Game in White Wolf #40 (1994), rating it a 4 out of 5 and stated that "All in all, I like this game because I love Pulp. Use that as a measuring stick. I see lots of potential and already have a strong feel for the genre. If you aren't familiar with Pulp storytelling, this game doesn't really help you. Games like Torg do a much better job of teaching Pulp techniques, and your starting efforts may be better put there."

Steve Crow reviewed War Against the Han in White Wolf #46 (Aug., 1994), rating it a 3 out of 5 and stated that "Overall, War Against the Han is helpful to anyone looking to flesh out their Buck Rogers sessions into a full-blown campaign. It may also be of use in other games, perhaps supplementing Nile Empire adventures for Torg. Overall, an average supplement."

== Reviews ==
- Dosdediez (Número 5 - Jul/Ago 1994)
- Casus Belli #79
