= Air War (game) =

1977 modern aerial combat board wargame

SPI's 1st edition box cover, 1977

Air War, subtitled "Modern Tactical Air Combat", is a board wargame published by Simulations Publications, Inc. (SPI) in 1977.

== Description ==
Air War is a wargame that details air combat in the 1970s. The game has been called "the most complex wargame ever." The description on the 1st edition box uses the term "ultra complex".

=== Components ===
The game contains:

- 700 die-cut counters
- 48-page rules booklet
- 16-page booklet of additional rules & scenarios
- 72-page chart booklet
- eight 8-1/2" x 11" maps scaled at 500 ft (152 m) per hex
- various play aids.

=== Gameplay ===
Each player takes control of a 1970s-era combat airplane and tries to destroy opposing aircraft. The game contains ten scenarios, with each turn representing 2.5 seconds of game time.

== Publication history ==
Air War was designed by David C. Isby, with art and graphic design by Redmond A. Simonsen, and was published by SPI in 1977 in either a flat box with counter tray or a bookcase box. A second edition with revised rules was published in 1979 using the same cover art.

Air War '80, an expansion that added 15 aircraft and 14 scenarios, was published by SPI in 1979.

When SPI was unexpectedly taken over by TSR in 1982, TSR tried to quickly get some of their money back by repackaging and republishing some of SPI's more popular titles. Air War was one of these, with new cover art by Rodger B. MacGowan.

In 1985, Hobby Japan published another expansion, Super Tomcat, that added 52 aircraft, and several rules revisions.

== Reception ==
In Issue 22 of the British wargaming magazine Perfidious Albion, Charles Vasey commented, "The Sequence is quite simple but a vast advance on other air combat systems because it needs no plotting but it does show up the advantages of position — I can see this being used in other games." In the following issue, Vasey and Geoffrey Barnard traded comments about the game. Vasey noted, "the game should give hours of pleasure to the Jet-freak who will find it takes him quite some time before he can fly a bombing mission in the ECM-heavy air of modern times." Barnard replied, "Considering the detail that is included, and not just as trimmings, but as real fabric, the game remains completely playable." Vasey concluded, "Not for those with just a passing fancy." Barnard concurred, saying, "A fascinating work of game design, but far far too minutely incremental for my land warfare orientated tastes."

In Issue 13 of Phoenix (May–June 1978), Dave Millward noted as a way of illustrating the complexity of the game that the control panel sheet for each aircraft was 21 inches (53 cm) long. He enjoyed Air War "partly because of its complexity — there is always something new. However, I guess you've gotta be an aeronut like me because it does require commitment to master it all." In Issue 25 (May–June 1980), Mike Stoner reviewed the expansion Air War '80 and admitted "Air War is a game you either love or hate." He was an admirer of the original game and liked the new additions in rules, aircraft and scenarios. For the game's fans, Stoner advised that "If the game is to your liking it'll give you innumerable hours of pleasure." In Issue 34, (November–December 1981), R.K. Jordan reviewed Air War and its expansion, Air War '80, and concluded that the game was so complex, the best way to play was as a team of several players, each handling one airplane function, aided by a computer and lots of time. He pointed out that in his experience, one turn representing 2.5 seconds could take two and a half weeks to play.

In his 1980 book The Best of Board Wargaming, Nicholas Palmer commented "Air War sets out quite simply to simulate modern air combat as accurately as possible." Palmer noted the extreme complexity of the game, but thought that "it is gradually possible to become familiar with all the concepts." He concluded by giving the game a below average "excitement" grade of only 40%, a rules clarity grade of 75% and the maximum complexity rating of 100%, saying, "Air War is far and away the best game for anyone wanting realistic air combat simulation and willing to invest the time needed to become at home with the rules."

In the 1980 book The Complete Book of Wargames, game designer Jon Freeman found the game ridiculously complex, saying, "There is apparently no absurd extreme to which SPI will not go in its quest for realism (or the appearance thereof) for which it will not have a small but vocal coterie shouting huzzahs at the results. [...] Many of the systems are unnecessarily complex and unwieldy, even for the intended level of realism." Freeman concluded by giving the game an Overall Evaluation of "For fanatics only", saying, "There are some nice features here, but most people will do better to await their adoption by less ambitious efforts."

In the March 1981 edition of The Space Gamer (No. 37), Craig Barber reviewed the expansion Air War '80 and thought that only those who were attracted to modern air combat should buy the game, saying, "As a simulation, AirWar '80 is of high quality. If you have the cash and the interest in jet combat, you might buy it. Anybody else should skip this one."

In The Guide to Simulations/Games for Education and Training, Richard Rydzel found the game to be unsuitable for classroom use, saying, "This game is far too complex for the usual gamer and cannot be used in a normal classroom situation. It is a very thorough and interesting game, but due to its complexity it will be played only by air war enthusiasts."

Roger Musson reviewed Air War for Imagine magazine, and stated that "Air War is definitely not a game for the novice. It requires a lot of effort just to fly your plane, let alone shoot another one down .... but for an experienced gamer who wants the best simulation of modern air combat available, this is it."

== Awards ==
At the 1978 Origins Awards, Air War was a finalist for "Best Tactical Game of 1977".

== Other reviews ==
- Casus Belli #33 (June 1986)
- Fire & Movement #10
- Fire & Movement #18
- Wargamer Vol. 1, #31
- Ann Arbor Wargamer #11
- Pursue & Destroy Vol. 2, #6
- The Grenadier #25
- Games & Puzzles #73
- Perfidious Albion #24 (January 1978) p. 3-5
