= Winged Magic =

Fantasy Novel

Winged Magic is a fantasy novel by Mary H. Herbert, published by TSR in 1996.

== Plot summary ==
Winged Magic is a novel in which sentient horses are able to speak fluently with their human friends.

== Reception ==
Paul Pettengale reviewed Winged Magic for Arcane magazine, rating it a 7 out of 10 overall. Pettengale comments that "The characters are soft and understated, and perhaps more believable for it, and although the writing is hardly world-class, it maintains a pace which carries you gently through the book without you really noticing. Yes, this is fun, with a distinctly feminine touch, and though saccharine, I think it's worth checking out."

== Reviews ==
- Kliatt
