= The Hunt for Red October (board game) =

1988 board game published by TSR

The Hunt for Red October is a naval board game published by TSR in 1988 that is based on the 1984 novel by Tom Clancy.

== Description ==
Like the Clancy novel, The Hunt for Red October is a 2-player game in which the American player tries to help the Russian submarine Red October defect to the United States, and the Russian player tries to hunt down the rogue submarine and destroy it. The game contains eight scenarios that require various forces and resources on both sides.

== Publication history ==
The 1984 bestseller The Hunt for Red October was Tom Clancy's first novel, and produced several commercial spin-offs including a 1987 video game. In 1988, TSR acquired the rights for a board game, and Douglas Niles designed one that was published the same year. The game was a hit for TSR, which claimed that the game was "one of the bestselling wargames of all time."

TSR followed up with a sequel board game in 1989, Red Storm Rising, based on Clancy's second novel of the same name.

== Reception ==
In Issue 10 of Gateways, Jack Trainman liked the game, writing, "All things considered, The Hunt For Red October boardgame by TSR is both a fairly realistic wargame in its own right and an excellent adaptation of an excellent novel. I would highly recommend it to wargamers everywhere."

In the inaugural issue of Games International, Mike Siggins's first impression of the components and rulebook was positive. But he found the game system to be overly simplistic, as if the game designer couldn't decide whether the game should be for wargamers or family game night. Siggins concluded by giving the game a below average rating of 2 stars out of 5, saying "In fairness to TSR it should be said that this is being marketed as a family game. Unfortunately though that is part of the problem for the game looks uncomfortable in either camp."

Author Graeme Shimmin called it "a fun game with relatively simple rules." He concluded, "if you like board wargames with lots of counters and dice rolling you’ll probably enjoy it."

== Reviews ==
- Best Games of 1988 in Games #94
- Casus Belli #47

== Awards ==
At the 1989 Origins Awards, The Hunt for Red October won "Best Boardgame of 1988 Covering the Period 1947 to Modern Day"

== Other recognition ==
A copy of The Hunt for Red October is held in the collection of the Strong National Museum of Play (object 116.3804).
