= Buck Rogers XXVC =

Science fiction tabletop role-playing game

- Designers: Flint Dille
- Publishers: TSR, Inc.
- Publication: 1988 (board game), 1990 (role-playing game)
- Genres: Science fiction

Buck Rogers XXVC (sometimes written as Buck Rogers in the 25th Century) is a game setting created by TSR, Inc. in the late 1980s. Products based on this setting include novels, graphic novels, a role-playing game (RPG), board game, and video games. The setting was active from 1988 until 1995.

== History ==
Buck Rogers is a fictional character created in 1928 by Philip Francis Nowlan. A Buck Rogers comic strip written by Nowlan was syndicated by John F. Dille (who may have contributed the nickname "Buck" to the character). Ownership of Buck Rogers and other works passed into the hands of the Dille Family Trust.

In the 1980s, John Dille's granddaughter, Lorraine Williams, was the president of TSR. In that decade, business for TSR was booming, mainly as a result of their popular RPG, Advanced Dungeons & Dragons. Lorraine Williams decided to merge Buck Rogers and D&D to make the XXVc game setting. A board game was released in 1988, followed by a role-playing game in 1990. The latter was based on the Advanced Dungeons & Dragons Second Edition rules, with minor differences. It was a new incarnation of the Buck Rogers world created by Williams' brother, Flint Dille. Its setting was limited to the Solar System, and it focused on interplanetary travel and terraforming. A few dozen expansion modules were published, and a line of novels and graphic novels.

The company TSR owned Advanced Dungeons & Dragons at the time and had worked with SSI on a computerized version of the rules. SSI developed their "Gold Box" game engine for Advanced Dungeons & Dragons, and this engine was used for the XXVc rules.

== Setting ==
=== History ===
The setting of XXVC is a possible future of the real universe that we live in. In the year 1999, the Soviet Union and the United States are involved in the "Last Gasp War." This is the world's first nuclear war.

This war causes many governments of Earth to abandon conventional warfare and embrace large alliances. Three of these alliances that grow to be superpowers are the Russo-American Mercantile ("RAM"), the Indo-Asian Consortium ("IAC"), and the Euro-Bloc Faction ("EBF"). In the latter half of the 21st century, these three alliances jointly form the System States Alliance ("SSA") for the purposes of exploring and colonizing the Solar System. Slowly, the SSA begins to terraform the inner planets. Mars is colonized by RAM, Luna is colonized by EBF, and Venus is controlled by IAC.

The main method of interplanetary travel from this time onward is the rocket ship. These vessels use fusion reactions to power the ship throughout its entire voyage. Rocket ships usually can range from 5 to 500 tons.

In the year 2275, RAM revolts against Earth and gains independence. Furthermore, because of Earth's dependence on the other planets for resources, RAM begins to dominate Earth. In 2310, refugees from Earth begin to colonize Mercury. In the next century, the asteroid belt and Jupiter begin to be settled. Human DNA is modified with genes from various animals, resulting in genetically modified humans commonly known as "gennies." These play a role in the settlement of Venus, Mars, Jupiter and also of many asteroids and moons.

In the first half of the 25th century, certain Terrans (inhabitants of Earth) form the New Earth Organization ("NEO"). This society plans to rebel against the rule of RAM and restore Earth to its former glory. After the revival of Buck Rogers, NEO is strengthened by alliances with other governments and space pirates. NEO is able to repel the occupation by RAM and fend off the ensuing large-scale attack by RAM.

Most of the XXVC material takes place in the time from 2430 until 2460.

=== Buck Rogers ===
Like all other versions of the Buck Rogers universe, the central story is that of Anthony "Buck" Rogers. Buck is the pilot of an experimental spacecraft for the American government in 1999. Buck is sent into space to destroy "MasterLink" - a heavily defended satellite that acts as the hub of the Soviet war machine. The MasterLink satellite is primarily controlled by an eponymous artificial intelligence, but as an experimental system, it is supplemented by a Soviet cosmonaut named "Karkov" - who murdered Rogers' parents years before while they were flying in a commercial jet the Soviet Union declared a spy craft.

The battle ends badly for both combatants; the Masterlink satellite is neutralized (but not destroyed), and Karkov dies from space exposure. Masterlink integrates Karkov's mind into its program before he dies. Rogers survives the battle, but his own ship has taken too much damage to make atmospheric reentry. Instead, he utilizes an experimental cryogenic system to await recovery. However, the "Last Gasp War" begins before a rescue can be attempted, and his preserved form is left drifting in space for the next five centuries.

In the year 2456, Rogers's spacecraft is discovered, and a number of factions race to recover it for various reasons. He is ultimately recovered by a civilian researcher who brings him out of cryogenic stasis, resurrecting the 20th century hero. Rogers, upon discovering what Earth has suffered in his absence, joins NEO, a resistance movement fighting to liberate Earth from its absentee landlord, RAM. His expertise, dedication and symbolic value ultimately prove to be the key to NEO's defeat of RAM.

=== Computer games ===
These two games were developed and published by SSI for various platforms and are entirely unrelated to Sega's 1982 Buck Rogers video game Buck Rogers: Planet of Zoom.

- Buck Rogers XXVc SF Computer RPG, Volume I: Countdown to Doomsday (Sep 1990, 16685-04135; Amiga, Commodore 64, MS-DOS, Sega Genesis.)
- Buck Rogers XXVc SF Computer RPG, Volume II: Matrix Cubed (Jan 1992, 16685-04154; MS-DOS.)

=== Board games ===
The Buck Rogers Battle for the XXVth Century board game (TSR, Jun 1988, ISBN 0-88038-586-3) was a strategy game, designed by Jeff Grubb, similar to Axis and Allies or Risk. Players maneuvered soldiers, ships, and gennies on a board representing the solar system. During the game, the planets moved, changing the relative distances of the various planets and their moons. In the advanced game, each player's leader character, based on a personage from the setting, had a unique special ability, and the gennies could be assigned special abilities based on their home planet.

Following lackluster response, TSR decided to try again with a more conventional table-top RPG, this time based on the original 1928 Philip Francis Nowlan novel Armageddon, 2419 A.D. (Ace, Aug 1978, ISBN 0-441-02939-6) and subsequent 1929 comic strip continuity, in which resurgent tribal Americans overthrow their Red Mongol conquerors. The basic game was called the High Adventure Cliffhangers Buck Rogers Adventure Game (Sep 1993, ISBN 1-56076-636-0) and was co-designed by Jeff Grubb and Steven Schend. The High Adventure Cliffhangers Buck Rogers War Against The Han Campaign Supplement (Dec 1993, ISBN 978-1-56076-683-4) was designed by Steven Schend alone. Although published by TSR as a licensed Buck Rogers property, this game is unconnected with the XXVC universe.

== Bibliography ==
=== Gaming supplements ===
- Pondsmith, Mike; Mohan, Kim; Dille, Flint; Pickens, Jon; Haring, Scott; Ward, James M. (1990). Buck Rogers XXVc. ISBN 0880388471.
- Niles, Doug (1990). Buck Rogers in the 25th Century. TSR. ISBN 0880388544.
- Tracy, William (1991). Inner Worlds. TSR. ISBN 1560760893.
- Henson, Dale (1990). Earth in the 25th Century. TSR. ISBN 088038879X.
- Denning, Troy (1990). N.E.O. in the 25th Century. TSR. ISBN 0880388730.
- Cook, Dave (1991). Luna. TSR. ISBN 1560760923.
- Winninger, Ray (1990). Mars in the 25th Century. TSR. ISBN 0880388641.
- The Belt. TSR. 1991. ISBN 1560760966.
- No Humans Allowed (1991)

=== Novels ===
There were 10 novels published under the XXVC banner, including three trilogies.

- Dille, Flint; Irvine, Abigail; Murdock, Melinda Seabrooke; Oltion, Jerry; O'Reilly, Ulrike; Sheckley, Robert (1989). Arrival. ISBN 0880385820.
- The Martian Wars Trilogy:
  - Murdock, Melinda Seabrooke (1989). Rebellion 2456. ISBN 0880387289.
  - Murdock, Melinda Seabrooke (1989). Hammer of Mars. ISBN 0880387513.
  - Murdock, Melinda Seabrooke (1989). Armageddon off Vesta. ISBN 0880387610.
- The Inner Planets Trilogy:
  - Miller, John (1990). First Power Play. ISBN 0880388404.
  - Murdock, Melinda Seabrooke (1990). Prime Squared. ISBN 0880388633.
  - Bloom, Britton (1991). Matrix Cubed. ISBN 0880388854.
- The Invaders of Charon Trilogy:
  - Brennan, C.M. (1992). The Genesis Web. ISBN 1560760931.
  - Keith, William H. (1992). Nomads of the Sky. ISBN 1560760982.
  - Keith, William H. (1993). Warlords of Jupiter. ISBN 1560765763.
