= Hilary Wilson =

British Egyptologist

- Born: Hilary Cawton
- Citizenship: United Kingdom
- Education: 1. Sutton High School, London; 2. University of Exeter; 3. University of Leicester; 4. The Open University
- Occupations: Teacher, writer
- Spouse: Philip Wilson
- Writing career
- Subject: Ancient Egypt
- Notable works: 1. Understanding Hieroglyphs; 2. People Of The Pharaohs; 3. Egyptian Food And Drink; 4. Egyptian Woman

Hilary Wilson is a British Egyptologist.

== Career ==
Wilson was an enthusiast of Egyptology since childhood. An alumna of Sutton High School, London, Wilson received her bachelor's degree in combined studies (mathematics, physics and history, including study of archaeology and medieval history) from the University of Leicester in 1971. She then studied at the University of Exeter and received her master's degree from the Open University.

Wilson was an associate lecturer in maths and archaeology at the Open University and, from the 1990s, taught Egyptology courses for the University of Southampton Continuing Education Department. She also appeared as "Setkemet, the Egyptian Lady" to introduce primary students to Egyptian history.

Wilson has written several books on Egyptian history, as well as novels set in ancient Egypt (some under the pen name Hilary Cawston, her maiden name). She published many articles for Ancient Egypt magazine and frequently wrote the magazine's "Per Mesut" feature for young readers. She has also published articles in History Today, and the Journal of Egyptian Archaeology

== Personal life ==
Wilson is married to Philip Wilson, emeritus Professor of Ship Dynamics at the University of Southampton. In 1998, their eldest son Richard was graduated from Leicester University, as both his parents had been.

Wilson's brother Timothy Cawston was among the founding faculty of Leicester Grammar School and later became deputy headmaster.

== Books ==
=== Egyptology ===
- Wilson, Hilary (2008). Egyptian Food and Drink. Shire Egyptology. Shire. ISBN 978-0852639726. OCLC 48127322

Surveys the constituents of the ancient Egyptian diet, with chapters on cereals and their uses, fruit and vegetables, meat, fish and fowl, and condiments.

- Wilson, Hilary (1997). People Of The Pharaohs: From Peasant To Courtier. Michael O'Mara Books. ISBN 9781854792181. OCLC 1036776190

This study seeks to bring to life the craftsmen, labourers and administrators of Ancient Egypt, looking at their religion, education and concept of order based on the family unit.

Dutch translation: Wilson, Hilary (1998). Het volk van de farao's [The People of the Pharaohs] (in Dutch). Translated by van Loon, Parma. VBK Media. ISBN 9789024604623. OCLC 67968886

Polish translation: Wilson, Hilary (1999). Lud faraonów : od wieśniaka do dworzanina [The People Of The Pharaohs: From Peasant To Courtier] (in Polish). Państ. Instytut Wydawniczy. ISBN 9788306027624. OCLC 830224359

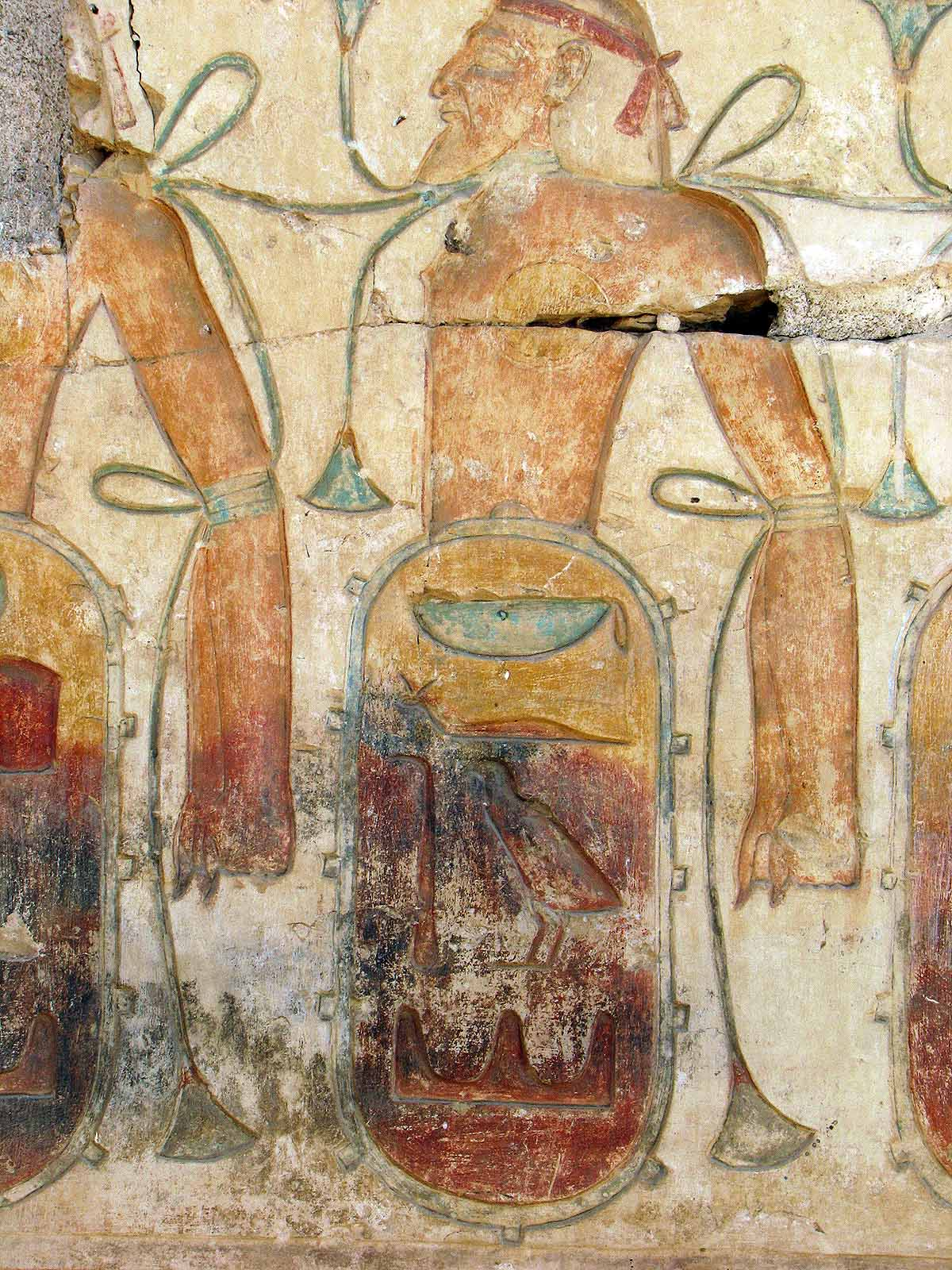
The hieroglyph "Keftiu" (K-f-t-U), "foreigner-hilly-land") – possibly a reference to the Caphtors – is seen in the cartouche (oval enclosure below the figure), part of a Nine Bows (group of nine figures depicting foreign nations) discussed in Chapter 1 of Understanding Hieroglyphs

- Wilson, Hilary (1993). Understanding Hieroglyphs: A Quick and Simple Guide. Michael O'Mara Books. ISBN 978-1854791641. OCLC 32443475

Teaches how to decipher Egyptian hieroglyphs. Hundreds of the most commonly used hieroglyphs are arranged in tables with translations, plus examples from monuments, ancient documents and museum exhibits. Fully illustrated throughout with line drawings, tables and maps.

The book is divided into ten chapters: "What's in a Name", "Personal Names", "Royalty", "Spirits of Place", "Be a Scribe", "Officialdom", "The Priesthood", "The Servants in the Place of Truth", "Keeping Count", and "Marking Time".

Chapter 1 covers the execration texts, as well as the Nine Bows of the Theban tomb of Surer, including Tutankhamun's Nine Bows' clay impression seal of Anubis that sealed his tomb. Chapter 5 ("Be a Scribe") has some introduction to cursive (or linear) hieroglyphs. Chapter 6, "Officialdom", begins by using the scenes from the Scorpion Macehead; the chapter also translates four minor scarab artifacts. The final chapter (10, "Marking Time), translates the famous label of Pharaoh Den and a Middle Egyptian stele of 14 horizontal lines; an offering table scene is translated to end the chapter and book.

"In a narrative and easy style the book leads you through various aspects of Egyptian life. It gives tables of various phrases attached to the theme (titles, parts of names, etc.) – the best thing in the book. But there are no transliterations anywhere, and not everyone will like the handwritten style of the hieroglyphs. Translations from monuments can be followed only if you previously know some Egyptian. It looks like an inscriptions help guide for museum visitors. Culturologically informative (nice maps of Egypt, hand-redrawn monuments), but miles from Collier-Manley in seriously introducing the script." – A. K. Eyma

French translation: Wilson, Hilary (2009). Lire et comprendre les Hieroglyphes - La méthode [Method for Reading and Understanding Hieroglyphs] (in French). TCHOU. ISBN 978-2710707653.

German translation: Wilson, Hilary (2001). Hieroglyphen lesen [Read Hieroglyphs] (in German). Bechtermünz. ISBN 978-3828907706.

Hungarian translation: Wilson, Hilary (2004). A Hieroglifák Rejtelye [The Mystery of Hieroglyphs] (in Hungarian). Translated by Erdő, Orsolya. Gold Book Kft. ISBN 9639248339.

Chinese translation: Wilson, Hilary (2021). 破解埃及文 從象形文字認識古埃及 [Deciphering Egyptian Writing: Learn About Ancient Egypt from Hieroglyphs] (in Chinese). Translated by Jiahuang, Qiu. 楓樹林 (Maple Forest). ISBN 978-9865572112.

=== Fiction ===
- Wilson, Hilary (2001). Egyptian Woman: A year in the life of a woman during the reign of Ramesses I. Michael O"Mara. ISBN 978-1854798008. OCLC 881568964

German translation: Wilson, Hilary (2005). Im Dienst der Pharaonen. Ein Jahr im alten Aegypten [In the Service of the Pharaohs: A year in Ancient Egypt] (in German). DTV Deutscher Taschenbuch. ISBN 978-3423342643.
Czech translation: Wilson, Hilary (2002). Egypťanka [Egyptian] (in Czech). Jota. ISBN 8072171860.

As Hilary Cawston, Wilson has self-published the novels Seeking Osiris (2015, 978-1507598139) and The Prince's Spy: a Story of Egypt (2105, 978-1508822363, a detective story based on the ancient Egyptian tale "The Treasure Thief"
