= How to Read Egyptian Hieroglyphs =

Primer book on Egyptian hieroglyphs

How to Read Egyptian Hieroglyphs is a primer on understanding Egyptian hieroglyphs. The text was written by Mark Collier (Egyptologist) and Bill Manley around 1998.

The standard version of analytic Egyptian hieroglyphs is based upon the 26 categories of the Gardiner's Sign List (about 700 signs), still the basic standard. According to WorldCat, the book is widely known and is held in 1062 libraries. How to Read Egyptian Hieroglyphs uses a simple approach with just six categories:

- Signs depicting people or parts of the human body
- Signs depicting creatures or parts of their bodies
- Signs depicting sky, earth, water or plants
- Other small signs
- Other tall signs
- Other broad signs

With the older styles and outlines of hieroglyphs being redone and rethought by modern Egyptologists, new approaches to books on the Egyptian language and the hieroglyphs have been tried.
