= Crosscheck (board game) =

1985 boardgame and 1986 video game

- Cover of the TSR board game
- Designers: Anne C. Gray
- Publishers: Boardgame: TSR; Computer game: Datasoft
- Publication: Boardgame: 1985; Videogame: 1987
- Genres: Strategy

Crosscheck is a strategy board game published by TSR in 1985 that combines elements of Scrabble with a crossword puzzle. Although the game did not sell well, a licensed computer game version published by Datasoft in 1986 proved considerably more popular.

== Description ==
Crosscheck is a board game for 2–4 players that combines strategy and words.

=== Components ===
The game consists of a several clue books — some for adults, some for children — a grease pencil, a ten-sided die, and a large diamond-shaped board marked with a blank crossword puzzle grid. Some of the squares on the board are colored, blocking them from being used. In the middle of the board is a large square bounded by four colored Starting Bars. Four Home Bases occupy the corners of the board.

=== Set up ===
The players must first decide

- Which dictionary will serve as the spelling and vocabulary authority.
- Which of the clue books to use.
- Which victory conditions to use: "Time Limit" (players must choose how long the game will last); "Points Limit" (players must choose how many points are needed to win); or Home Base Game.
- Each player chooses a Home Base, which is the same color as the player's starting bar.

=== Gameplay ===
The object of the game is to link words together in a chain that stretches from a player's Start Bar to the Home Base.

The first player rolls the die.

- A roll of 1 allows the player to place a block anywhere on the board,. The player also earns 1 point.
- A roll of 2 gives the player a free letter. The player chooses whichever letter is the most useful and places it anywhere on the board adjacent to a word. The letter must form a word, or modify an existing word to form a new word. The player earns 2 points.
- A roll of 3 to 10 determines the number of letters that the player's answer must be. The player then must answer one of the short crossword clues from the clue book. The player's answer must match the answer given in the clue book, or must be a synonym of the answer.

For example, the player has rolled a 6 (a six-letter word) and is given the clue "Slower than a gallop." The cluebook identifies the correct answer as "canter". If the player gets this answer, then the player can write "canter" on the board, forwards or backwards, but starting on the player's Start Bar. If the player replies with a synonym of "canter" that is also six letters in length such as "barrel", "hustle" or "scurry" — and the other players agree that it is a synonym — then the player can add that word to the board instead.

Answering a clue successfully earns the player 5 points plus a point for each letter in the answer. ("Canter" would earn 5 + 6 = 11 points). On subsequent turns, the player can write answers anywhere on the board and may connect their words to other players' words.

If any letters from an answer are adjacent to another word, then like Scrabble, all adjacent letters must form words. Example The player must add "LITTLE" to the board:

     T
ANSWER 
LITTLE 
L    E

This is incorrect play, since "NI", "WT", etc., are not words.

     T
ANSWER
L    E
LITTLE

This is correct play.

The first player to connect their Starting Bar to the Home Base with an unbroken string of words earns 100 points.

=== Victory conditions ===
- Time Limit: The player with the most points at the end of the chosen time limit is the winner.
- Points Limit: The first player to reach the chosen point level is the winner
- Home Base Game: This game does not use points. The first player to connect an unbroken string of words from their Start Bar to their Home Base is the winner.

== Publication history ==
In the mid-1980s, TSR sought to broaden their product line beyond role-playing games like Dungeons & Dragons by publishing a number of board games, including All My Children, Spy Ring, and Crosscheck . The latter, designed by Anne C. Gray, was released in 1985, but failed to find an audience.

Datasoft, an imprint of IntelliCreations, acquired a license to produce a video game version. The result, titled Crosscheck: A Strategy Crossword Game, was released by Datasoft in 1986 for MS-DOS, Commodore 64, Atari 8-bit computers, and Apple II. The computer version only differed from the original by providing a solo option.

== Reception ==
Writing in Abyss, Dave Nalle reviewed the board game and liked it. noting that the game components were "nicely produced, at minimal practical expense." Nalle noted that the game was "enjoyable to play, with a bit of the feel of a number of other popular games." Nalle concluded, "With the elements it combines, it is probably a fairly safe bet from a marketing standpoint, though it tends to lose appeal after repeated play."

Computer Entertainer didn't like the solitaire version, noting "We weren't impressed all that impressed with the solo game, mainly because there's no opportunity to apply strategy, which we think is one of Crosscheck's best qualities." However, for games with 2 to 4 players, the reviewer concluded by giving this game a rating of 3.5 out of 4, saying , "If you like crossword puzzles and word games such as Scrabble, you'll find Crosscheck very entertaining. Recommended."

In Commodore Magazine, Gary V. Fields reviewed the computer game and noted, "The game combines the better qualities of several proven games like dominos, chinese checkers and crossword puzzles. But best of all, like a good board game, Crosscheck's rules are both few and easy to understand. So getting started is simple, but mastering the game is a different matter altogether." One problem that Fields identified was the lack of any difficulty selection. "There is no way to handicap players with different abilities ... Normally, I like to play word games with my children [but] because of the absence of difficulty levels, I played Crosscheck with only my wife."

In Issue 13 of Info, Mark Brown noted, "There are elements of Scrabble and crosswords combined in this game, and it should have some appeal for any word game addict." Brown concluded by giving this game a rating of 3 out of 5, saying, "The graphics are not much to speak of, but it seems to have a fairly extensive word list, and it lets you cheat!"
