= A Gleam of Bayonets: The Battle of Antietam =

Board game

A Gleam of Bayonets: The Battle of Antietam is a board wargame published by the Simulations Publications, Inc. (SPI) subsidiary of TSR in 1983 that is based on the American Civil War Battle of Antietam.

== Description ==
A Gleam of Bayonets: The Battle of Antietam is a two-player "monster" wargame (contains more than 1,000 counters) that simulates the 1862 Battle of Antietam. The game is a regimental-level recreation of the battle, using a scale of 1 hex for each 120 yards. Each game turn represents 20 minutes of time.

=== Components ===
The boxed set contains:

- two 22" x 34" maps
- two rulebooks
- two six-sided dice
- two plastic tray with snap-on lids for counters
- 1600 counters

=== Gameplay ===
There are three scenarios included with the game:

1. Hooker's Attack: The early morning attack of Union Major General Joseph Hooker against the left flank of Confederate General Robert E. Lee.
2. Hooker & Mansfield: A continuation of Scenario 1, where the Union XII Corps of Major General Joseph K. Mansfield joins the battle
3. The Grand Battle: Covers the entire battle.

=== Victory conditions ===
In all scenarios, victory is determined by a combination of geographic objectives and casualties inflicted.

== Publication history ==
In 1976, Richard H. Berg designed a grand tactical, regimental level board wargame, Terrible Swift Sword, that simulated the Battle of Gettysburg. Published by SPI, the game won that year's Charles S. Roberts Award for "Best Tactical Wargame". Using the same set of rules, Berg created more games simulating Civil War Battles, several of them considerably smaller in scale, in what is now known as the Great Battles of the American Civil War (GBACW) series. Between 1978 and 1981, SPI published eight more of these games. Berg started development of the next game in 1981, another grand tactical game with 1600 counters that would simulate the Battle of Antietam. Berg added several new rules to try to simulate Union hesitancy during the battle, and the game underwent a long period of playtesting. In late 1982, just as it was judged ready for publication, SPI fell into financial difficulties. TSR suddenly took over SPI, reduced it to a subsidiary, and looked to quickly publish some of the games that SPI had under development, including Battle Over Britain and Berg's game about Antietam. Several changes were made to Berg's new rules, and the game was published as A Gleam of Bayonets. (Berg disliked the title, saying, "Personally I think it sounds like toothpaste.") It became the first Berg-designed GBACW game to be published under the TSR trademark, with artwork by Ivor Janci and Kitty Thompson.

== Reception ==
In Issue 14 of Imagine, Roger Musson liked the color coding of unit counters, making for easy recognition. But he warned, "since it is a big game, it takes a big investment of time and effort to play it. But seeing a major battle recreated this way, in this much detail, is a very rewarding gaming experience." He also noted that this was not a game for beginners, saying, "If you don't have previous experience of this sort of game, it would be better to pick up one of the smaller TSS [Terrible Swift Sword]-type games before tackling such a large example as this."

In Issue 30 of The Grenadier, Dr. Peter Perla liked the quality of the components and the maps, but noted shortages of several types of markers. Perla also thought the addition of extra rules concerning artillery and brigade retreat were well-designed, but given the number of counters and the length of the battle, he called the "Grand Battle" scenario "a grueling test of player endurance." In addition, he suggested that this was not a good team game, especially for the Union. Perla estimated that "A Union team of two or more players will leave all but one with little to do for several turns." Perla was not impressed with Berg's new rules that prevented an all-out assault by the Union, designed to simulate the hesitancy of the Union commander, George B. McClellan. While Perla agreed that some sort of system had to be in place to give the game a semblance of accuracy, he felt that the rules as designed allowed the Confederate player to plan an overwhelming early assault, knowing that many Union units would not be joining the battle until later. Perla concluded that the game was "a near miss. Despite its flaws, however, it comes close enough to be a worthwhile addition to the Civil War gamer's library."

== Other reviews ==
- Strategy & Tactics #98
- Fire & Movement #83 and #86
- The Wargamer, Vol. 1 No. 31
- The Grenadier #24
- Simulations Canada Newsletter #12
