= Red Storm Rising (board game) =

WW3 boardgame based on the novel by Tom Clancy

Red Storm Rising is a board game published by TSR, Inc. in 1989.

== Publication history ==
The game was designed by Douglas Niles, based on the novel Red Storm Rising by Tom Clancy.

== Reception ==
Alan R. Moon reviewed Red Storm Rising for Games International magazine, and gave it 4 stars out of 5, and stated that "I'm hoping they are going to continue to do games like Red Storm Rising and pick up the Gamemaster Series ball in the other hand and run with it at the same time."

The game won the Origins Award for Best Modern-Day Boardgame of 1989 and Best Graphic Presentation of a Boardgame of 1989.

The Washington Post identified Red Storm Rising as a game that will test the player's knowledge and expertise.

== Reviews ==
- "The Year's Best Games" in Games #101
