= Wall Street Spin =

- Publishers: FunSpin
- Players: 2–6
- Setup time: 3 minutes
- Playing time: 1-1.5 hours
- Chance: high
- Age range: 10 and up
- Skills: Math, Strategy, Bargaining
- Website: http://www.funspin.com

Wall Street Spin is a board game with a stock market theme.

== History ==
Wall Street Spin was created by Don and Betty Deitch and first published by FunSpin Games in 2003. After losing a considerable sum of money in the stock market, Don and Betty got the idea of designing a game based on the ups and downs of the stock market. After being diagnosed with cancer and being told he had six months to live, Donald fought his cancer. When he beat the cancer, he and his wife invested money into publishing their prototype in 2003. They recruited the help of Oscar-winning animation director Gene Deitch to write the company names and called upon Melanie Paykos Design to design the final game board.

== Gameplay ==
Many aspects are of the game are affected by the patented Fun Spin spinner. It replaces dice for pawn movement, it generates random good or bad events which affect every player and it changes the prices of stock dividends by multiplying them.

Players go around the board buying stock in companies they land on. If someone else lands on these stocks, they must pay the owner a dividend which is calculated as a base price on the stock card multiplied by a spin of the spinner. As groups of stocks are purchased, each stock generates more income. These powerful stock groups can be broken up by random chance with Market Events and News Cards.

The game play is similar to Monopoly, but time limit rules make the game have a faster pace and end faster. The timed game is an optional rule, so instead of seeing who has the most money in an hour, an epic marathon game can last for days.

== Reception ==
Melissa Schorr for Oakland Tribune said that "The game gets off to a slow start, but if your family has ever spent an entire rainy Sunday absorbed in the wheeling and dealing of Monopoly, you may enjoy this stock market-style version."

== Awards ==
Wall Street Spin was named as one of Dr. Toy's Best Children's Vacation Products of 2003.
