= Vampyre (microgame) =

Vampyre is a 1981 board game published by TSR.

== Gameplay ==
Vampyre is a game in which players are vampire hunters seeking to destroy Dracula.

== Reception ==
William A. Barton reviewed Vampyre in The Space Gamer No. 42. Barton commented that "Vampyre can be a fun little 'beer and pretzels' game if not taken seriously. It's even fun sinking your fangs into one of your fellow players after you've grown your own fur or bat wings. But if you have to be the master of your own fate - avoid Vampyre like you-know-who would avoid a crucifix."

Duke Ritenhouse commented in a 1998 article that "The big red dragon from Lake Geneva even got into the act by 1981, taking time out from counting its Advanced Dungeons & Dragons profits to release a series of minis that came in ridiculous unwieldy, clear plastic cases. Anyone remember They've invaded Pleasantville? Revolt on Antares? Vampyre? For that matter, does anyone remember Remember the Alamo?"
