= Saga (microgame) =

Board game

Saga is a 1980 board game published by TSR.

== Gameplay ==
Saga is a game in which the player are Viking heroes in northern Europe fighting trolls, giants, drows, ghosts, witches, dragons, jarls and other heroes.

== Reception ==
W. G. Armintrout reviewed Saga in The Space Gamer No. 46. Armintrout commented that "As an introductory game, Saga is very good. People who play Sorry won't be intimidated by it. It is a poor game if you play for competition rather than for fun - luck is too important. Otherwise, it is an average beer-and-pretzels games."
