= Roy V. Young =

American fantasy writer

Roy V. Young is an American fantasy writer. His novels are set in the comedy world of Leiblein, and spoof various common fantasy themes. The hero is a certain Count Yor, and his associates Dword and Trebor. Yor's inability to avoid rumour of his own exploits, especially the "Ballad of Count Yor" is a constant theme through the novels.

In the 1990s publisher TSR commissioned a number of standalone fantasy novels, some of which were humorous or light fantasy. Young's first volume was endorsed by Roger Zelazny, and sold well enough to justify a second. The collapse of TSR meant that no more were commissioned. A third novel exists in manuscript, provisionally titled "Year of the Thogs."

== Bibliography ==
- Captains Outrageous. TSR, 1994.
- Yor's Revenge. TSR, 1995.
