= Dallas (role-playing game) =

1980 tabletop role-playing game

- Designers: Jim Dunnigan
- Publishers: Simulations Publications Inc.
- Publication: 1979

Dallas: The Television Role-Playing Game is a role-playing game created by the wargame publisher Simulations Publications, Inc. (SPI) in 1980 based on the popular television soap opera Dallas. The game was an attempt by debt-ridden SPI to find a new audience, but it was "a massive failure, one of the biggest in the history of RPGs" and also succeeded in alienating SPI's wargaming clientele.

== Description ==
Dallas, the second licensed role-playing game (after Star Trek: Adventure Gaming in the Final Frontier (1978) from Heritage Models), is a TV soap-opera/crime system in which the players take on the roles of major characters from the Dallas TV series, and interact with each other in "plots." Character abilities include power, persuasion, coercion, seduction, investigation, and luck; ability scores are compared and dice are rolled to determine the results of actions.

=== Components ===
The game box contains:

- 16-page "Rules of Play"
- 16-page "Scriptwriter's Guide" for the Director
- "Major Characters" booklet outlining the nine main characters
- 56 cards of secondary characters and organizations
- two six-sided dice

=== Gameplay ===
In addition to a player's main character, the player is dealt cards to give them control of a certain number of secondary characters and organizations. During the Conflict phase of each scene, players can attempt to take control of more secondary characters and organizations, using their powers of Power, Persuasion, Coercion, Seduction, Investigation and Chance.

Three scenarios are included with the game; each is divided into "scenes" that each have three phases:

- Presentation: The Director explains the scene and adds new minor characters and organizations either directly to one or more players, or as "free" entities in the center of the table.
- Negotiation: Players have a limited time to have public or private discussions with other players, which can result in loans and/or agreements being made, and the exchange of money and cards.
- Conflict: Players have an opportunity to take actions against other players, or take control of some of the "free" cards in the center of the table.

Unlike other role-playing games of the time, Victory Conditions are outlined in each script, and the player who has the most at the end of the scenario is the winner.

== Publication history ==
In serious debt in 1980, SPI made an attempt to expand its customer base beyond its "hobbyist" core of wargamers by entering into a much-publicized arrangement with Lorimar Productions to produce the Dallas role-playing game. Dallas was designed by James F. Dunnigan, with art by Redmond A. Simonsen, and was published by SPI in October 1980 at the height of the "Who Shot J.R." craze.

Despite the popularity of the television show, the game proved to be an infamous failure, and art director Redmond Simonsen later remarked that the 80,000 copies printed "was about 79,999 more than anyone wanted. Anyone who is wired on Dallas (the TV show) is not also wired on games."

Lawrence Schick, in his 1991 book Heroic Worlds: A History and Guide to Role-Playing Games, noted that not only did SPI fail to develop a new audience of gamers with Dallas, but the game also alienated SPI's traditional wargaming clientele: "As much a card game as a role-playing game, it was widely loathed by SPI's devoted following of wargamers."

== Reception ==
In Issue 49 of the British wargaming magazine Perfidious Albion, Charles Vasey wrote, "This 90-day wonder is perhaps one of the most awful rip-offs I have ever seen. It is simply one of those social interaction games in which conflicts are resolved with dice and modifiers are applied to give the effect of, say, persuasiveness which is not actually possessed by the gamer." Vasey thought the only way to improve the game was human intervention, noting, "Of course the Director (DM) could make the game really interesting, but if he did it would be something to which the game contributed nothing. If you simply invent some modifiers you can save all that money." Vasey concluded, "Worst of all, all you get for your money is two sets of cards and some scraps of paper - nothing of which aids in the illusion that you are actually there. Cheap-skate and nebulous — bah!"

In Issue 42 of The Space Gamer (August 1981), David Ladyman wasn't sure this game would find an audience, saying, "Is Dallas a useful bridge between gaming and your 'real world' friends? That might depend on how many Dallas freaks you know that you would want to introduce to gaming. Hard core RPGers will probably want to add the game to their collection; characters' attributes and the conflict resolution system are novel enough, even if you have no interest in the television series. I wouldn't suggest it, though, if you buy your games for long-term playability - Dallas just doesn't have lasting entertainment value."

The March 1981 edition of Games commented, "Surprisingly, this intro-level game could stand on its merits even without the popular theme. The game provides a simple, realistic mechanism for recreating and inventing the high-rolling exploits of the Ewing family ... Watch out, primetime, we've found something else to do."

The French games magazine Jeux & Stratégie commented "We are able to put ourselves in the character's shoes quite well. In addition, the composition of the game is more reminiscent of making a film than of a game." The review concluded, "All you have to do is blackmail, scheme and corrupt at your leisure, in order to achieve your objectives! Nothing stops you from being kind and honest; but, if you want to win..."

In the 2016 book Television: The Medium and Its Manners, Peter Conrad called the game "a ludic Dallas do-it-yourself kit. Dallas: The Television Role-Playing Game disassembles the series and parcels it up as sociological poker." Conrad noted, "When you tire of the scripts in the box, you can rig up your own. Since it's all a matter of shuffling and combining formulae, the possibilities are infinite."

In his 2023 book Monsters, Aliens, and Holes in the Ground, RPG historian Stu Horvath noted that sales of the game had been "a massive failure, one of the biggest in the history of RPGs." However, while Dallas failed to find an audience, Horvath thought the game itself broke new ground, saying, "playing the game properly delivers an experience not unlike the events of an episode of Dallas. For RPGs in 1980, this focus on emergent narratives is really different and exciting — competitive troupe play (rather than swordplay) was the path to victory ... There was nothing else remotely like it on the market."

== Other recognition ==
A copy of Dallas is held in the collection of the Strong National Museum of Play (object 110.3209).
