= Escape from New York (game) =

Board game

- Box art
- Designers: David Cook; Harold Johnson
- Publishers: TSR, Inc.
- Publication: 1981; 45 years ago
- Players: 2 to 4
- Playing time: 45 minutes
- Skills: Strategy

Escape from New York is a 1981 board game by TSR, Inc. and illustrated by Erol Otus and Bill Willingham and based on the John Carpenter film Escape from New York, which was released that same year.

== Overview ==
The objective of each game player is the same as Snake Plissken's in the film. Players attempt to locate the President of the United States and get him off the prison island of Manhattan. Failing that, they are to find the cassette tape the President is carrying. Failing that, they die.

== Reviews ==
- Jeux & Stratégie #19
