= Attack Force (microgame) =

Board game

Attack Force is a 1982 board game published by TSR.

== Gameplay ==
Attack Force is a minigame in which one player uses the Eagle and Falcon Star-Fighters of the Arcturan Federation to try to destroy the massive Novaship.

== Reception ==
John Rankin reviewed Attack Force in The Space Gamer No. 61. Rankin commented that "The unbalanced solo scenario and the one-dimensional nature of the game preclude it from becoming a favorite. To be fair, Attack Force was really designed to introduce 10- to 12-year olds to the joys of adventure gaming. Alas, in this respect, it fails. If the ambiguities and poor development bother an experienced gamer, they're liable to turn away the novice."
