= Mary H. Herbert =

American novelist

- Born: Mary Houser Herbert; 1957 (age 68–69)
- Education: University of Montana; University of Wyoming
- Occupation: Writer
- Children: 2
- Writing career
- Genre: Fantasy
- Notable work: Winged Magic (1996)

Mary Houser Herbert (born 1957) is an American fantasy writer, author of the Dark Horse series and several Dragonlance novels.

== Biography ==
Mary Houser Herbert was born in Ohio in 1957. Growing up in Troy, Ohio, she was interested in history and riding and was an avid reader of fantasy. Her first complete science fiction/fantasy short story about an orbiting space station won first prize in her high school's writing contest.

She continued to write stories, essays, and poetry while studying at the University of Montana, the University of Wyoming, and the Center for Medieval and Renaissance Studies in Oxford, England.

Since publishing her first novel, Dark Horse, in 1990, TSR Books has published an additional two novels in the Dark Horse Series as well as Dragonlance universe and other novels, three short stories in the Forgotten Realms Anthologies (see bibliography), and a chapter on Sanction in Bertrem's Guide to the War of Souls, Volume One.

Herbert lives in Metro Atlanta with her husband, two teenage children, and pets.

== Selected works ==
=== Dark Horse Series ===
Hunnuli are a breed of wild horse magically created to partner and protect good magic wielders. They are huge, powerful, black and elegant, with a white lightning-bolt marking on their shoulder. Held in high regard even when humans forget their original purpose, the Hunnuli are immune to magic, fully sentient, and communicate telepathically with their chosen humans. They are intolerant of evil, and will fight to the death rather than serve an evil master.

- Dark Horse (1990)
- Lightning's Daughter (1991)
- Valorian (1993)
- City of the Sorcerers (1994)
- Winged Magic (1996)
- Valorian's Children (2000)
- Valorian's Legacy (2003)

=== Dragonlance Universe ===
Bridges of Time novel 2 in the series:

- Legacy of Steel [November 1998, TSR, Inc., ISBN 0-7869-1187-5]

Crossroads novels 1 and 3:

- Clandestine Circle (2000)
- Dragon's Bluff (2001)

Linsha novels 1, 2 and 3

- City of the Lost (2003)
- Flight of the Fallen (2004)
- Return of the Exile (2005)
- Short story about Linsha in Dragons of Time

=== War of Souls ===
- Bertrem's Guide to the War of Souls 1 (2001)
- Bertrem's Guide to the War of Souls 2

=== Anthologies containing Mary H. Herbert short stories ===
- Realms of Mystery (Forgotten Realms, June 1998, TSR, Inc., ISBN 0-7869-1171-9 )
- Realms of Magic (Forgotten Realms, December 1995, TSR, Inc., ISBN 0-7869-0303-1 )
- Realms of Infamy (Forgotten Realms December 1994, TSR, Inc., ISBN 1-56076-911-4 )
