= Simulations Publications, Inc. =

American board game publisher (1969–1982)

- Industry: Gaming
- Founded: 1969; 57 years ago
- Defunct: 1982; 44 years ago
- Fate: Loan foreclosure by TSR resulting in assets seizure
- Successor: TSR
- Headquarters: 44 East 23rd Street, New York City; later moved to 257 Park Avenue South
- Key people: James F. Dunnigan (founder); Redmond A. Simonsen (art director); Howie Barasch (marketing manager)
- Products: Board wargames; Strategy & Tactics; Ares; Moves

Simulations Publications, Inc. (SPI) was an American publisher of board wargames and related magazines, particularly its flagship Strategy & Tactics, in the 1970s and early 1980s. It produced an enormous number of games and introduced innovative practices, changing the course of the wargaming hobby in its bid to take control of the hobby away from then-dominant Avalon Hill. SPI ran out of cash in early 1982 when TSR called in a loan secured by SPI's assets. TSR began selling SPI's inventory in 1982, but later acquired the company's trademarks and copyrights in 1983 and continued a form of the operation until 1987.

== History ==
=== Origin and early years ===
Jim Dunnigan had been introduced to Avalon Hill wargames while serving in the U.S. Army in Korea. Upon his return to civilian life in 1964, Dunnigan began to contribute articles to Avalon Hill's house publication The General and independent wargaming magazine Strategy & Tactics. In one of his contributions to The General, Dunnigan criticized what he saw as a lack of historical accuracy in Avalon Hill's 1965 release, Battle of the Bulge. Thomas Shaw, at the time in charge of Avalon Hill, asked Dunnigan to design and submit his own wargame. The result was Jutland, published by Avalon Hill in 1967. Two years later, after designing 1914 for Avalon Hill, Dunnigan struck out on his own after concluding there must be a "more effective way to publish games." He quickly gathered a staff of like-minded designers, including Al Nofi and Redmond A. Simonsen. Dunnigan acquired Strategy & Tactics, which had been in financial trouble, from its founder Christopher Wagner. Dunnigan founded Simulations Publications in 1969 with Redmond Simenson as co-founder to keep Strategy & Tactics in publication. However, SPI quickly proved that it was primarily a game publisher rather than a magazine publisher; not only did it start to publish a variety of wargames, but each issue of Strategy & Tactics included a complete wargame, comprising a map, rule book and a sheet of die-cut counters.

In SPI's first two or three years, it embarked upon an expensive advertising campaign, including — but not limited to — full page advertisements in Scientific American magazine. New subscribers received free copies of its most successful game, Napoleon At Waterloo, an "easy to play" pocket-sized game with a foldout map and 78 pieces punched from card stock. This advertising campaign led to a much larger subscriber base and SPI came to be seen as a serious competitor to Avalon Hill, the company that had founded the board wargaming hobby.

While S&T had started as a wargaming 'fanzine', under SPI it became more of a military history magazine that included a wargame. So in 1972, SPI started Moves as a house organ that talked about current and future SPI games, including a fair amount of information on SPI's game design process.

In 1974, SPI started to ship some of their wargames games to J.D. Bardsley in the UK, who acted as a sales representative using the name SP/UK. Bardsley sold the games either via mail order or face to face at games conventions. Sales increased rapidly, and by March 1976, SP/UK had sold 25,000 units. To handle the increased sales, SPI formed a formal British subsidiary, Simpubs Ltd. in June 1976. Simpubs immediately created the bi-monthly periodical Phoenix with J.D. Bardsley as managing editor.

=== Demise and asset acquisition by TSR ===
In an attempt to expand its customer base, SPI entered into a much-publicized arrangement with Lorimar Productions to produce the Dallas role-playing game based on the soap opera Dallas in 1980. The game proved to be an infamous failure, and Simonsen later remarked that the 80,000 copies printed were 79,999 too many.

SPI had shopped for venture capital providers to take advantage of the perceived expansion of the gaming market in the late 1970s. When the expansion did not deliver the expected higher profits, only higher sales, the money needed to be returned. First efforts led to discussions with Avalon Hill to merge with or acquire SPI, but that did not materialize, partially due to the increasing losses in cash for SPI thanks to the increases in costs from inflation and the decreases in revenue. AH did purchase five of SPI's titles, which helped with operational costs. However, more money was needed.

SPI negotiated a promissory note loan (at the time mentioned as $225,000 but here listed as $400,000 from TSR (the publishers of Dungeons & Dragons). The note was guaranteed by SPI's assets. SPI used the cash to pay their venture capitalists. However, less than two weeks later, TSR called in the note. SPI, with no cash available and no options to get the funds, were forced to give over their inventory stock to TSR in early 1982, and were effectively out of business. TSR originally claimed they acquired SPI, but as that would mean they also would be responsible for their debts, quickly changed that statement. SPI's assets, but not its debts and liabilities, were acquired by TSR in 1983. TSR refused to honor SPI subscriptions and used the "assets, not liabilities" agreement to ignore SPI's debts. This policy alienated many of TSR's potential customers.

=== Aftermath ===
In an effort to make money from the SPI intellectual properties that they now owned, TSR released several titles that were ready for publication but had been stranded by a lack of money for printing, such as Battle Over Britain and Richard Berg's latest contribution to the Great Battles of the American Civil War series, A Gleam of Bayonets: The Battle of Antietam. TSR also reboxed and republished several popular SPI titles from the mid-1970s under the TSR logo, including Air War, Blue & Gray: Four American Civil War Battles, and Napoleon's Last Battles. However, TSR halted all SPI game development in progress, and most SPI game designers resigned and moved to rival company Avalon Hill, lured by the formation of a subsidiary specifically for them called Victory Games.

== Awards ==
- Charles S. Roberts Award, Best Professional Magazine of 1974, 1975, 1976, and 1977: Strategy & Tactics
- Charles S. Roberts Award, All Time Best Fantasy Board Game of 1977: War of the Ring
- Charles S. Roberts Award, Best 20th Century Game of 1978: To the Green Fields Beyond
- Charles S. Roberts Award, Best 20th Century Game of 1979: City-Fight
- Charles S. Roberts Award: Best Fantasy or Science Fiction Game of 1979: The Creature That Ate Sheboygan
- H. G. Wells Award, Best Roleplaying Rules of 1979: Commando
- Charles S. Roberts Award, Best Pre-20th Century Boardgame of 1980: Empires of the Middle Ages
- H. G. Wells Award: Best Roleplaying Rules of 1980: DragonQuest

== See also ==
- List of SPI games
- Operational Studies Group
- Victory Games

== Bibliography ==
- 1977: Wargame Design: The History, Production, and Use of Conflict Simulation Games (ISBN 0-917852-01-X)
- 1977: War in the East: The Russo-German Conflict 1941–45 (ISBN 0-917852-00-1)
