= Battle Over Britain =

Board game

Cover of TSR/SPI edition, 1983

Battle Over Britain is a board wargame published by the SPI subsidiary of TSR in 1983 that simulates the Battle of Britain.

== Description ==
Battle Over Britain is a two-player game that simulates air combat in the skies of Britain that took place in August and September 1940. The game can be played on three levels:

1. Strategic game (15 hours)
2. Full campaign (several days)
3. Tactical combat game (several hours)

In the Second Edition published by PSC Games in 2017 and retitled Battle of Britain, the scenarios of the strategic game are reduced to 1–2 hours each, and the full campaign can be completed in 3–4 hours.

=== Components ===
- two 22" x 34" maps of Britain and northern France. These can be used individually or joined together to form a master map, depending on the level of game being played.
- 800 die-cut counters
- rule book
- 20-sided die
- counter tray
- British Airfield Display
- dividing screen, to keep the British Airfield Display secret

=== Gameplay ===
The German player plans day or night raids and which bomber and fighter forces will be used. The British player lays down hidden fighter factories and command centers, and deploys flak to defend potential targets. When the German force crosses the British radar line, the German player must reveal the size of the raid, at which point the British player must decide whether to intercept, and which squadrons to commit. If the British fighters are able to pierce the German screen of hunter fighters, they can engage the Germans' main force. If this happens, the German player must decide whether to press on or abort the mission. If the German fights through the British attack, the raid must then contend with any flak defenses around the target before bombing or strafing the target. Victory Points are assigned to either player depending on how many German bombers and fighters were destroyed, and how much damage was done to British targets.

=== Victory conditions ===
To prevent either player from holding back forces until the last turn and then unleashing them in an all-out effort, the game has a variable end of game so that the players do not know when the game will end. When the game does end, the player with the most Victory Points wins.

== Publication history ==
In 1982, as wargame publisher Simulation Publications, Inc. (SPI) struggled with debt, John H. Butterfield designed Battle Over Britain. When TSR acquired the assets of SPI in 1983, the game was almost ready for publication, and was released under the TSR trademark.

In 2017, PSC Games acquired the license to the game, and produced a second edition, featuring streamlined rules for dogfighting, fuel, and ace squadrons.

A single plane-versus-plane tactical wargame titled Battle Over Britain: RAF vs Luftwaffe, Summer 1940 published by Minden Games in 2013 is not related to the original TSR/SPI game.

== Reception ==
In Issue 14 of Imagine, Peter O'Toole said "the game is of epic proportions. The detail is remarkable even for SPI." He did note this is more of a grand strategic game rather than a single fighter-versus-bomber game, saying, "In all it's a game for master tacticians rather than be-goggled fighter pilots." O'Toole concluded with a strong recommendation, calling the game "A subtle and tense contest between the mighty Luftwaffe and 'The Few'."

== Other reviews ==
- Strategy & Tactics #91 (Winter 1983)
- Fire & Movement #42 (Winter 1984)
- Fire & Movement #72 (march/April 1991)
- The Grenadier #21 (1984)
- Simulations Canada Newsletter #13
