= TSR, Inc. =

Former company, publisher of "Dungeons & Dragons"

- Type: Subsidiary
- Traded as: Nasdaq: TSRI
- Industry: Role-playing game publisher
- Founded: 1973; 53 years ago
- Founder: Gary Gygax; Don Kaye
- Defunct: 1997
- Fate: Acquired and discontinued
- Successor: Wizards of the Coast
- Headquarters: Lake Geneva, Wisconsin, United States
- Key people: Gary Gygax; Brian Blume; Lorraine Williams
- Products: Dungeons & Dragons
- Parent: Wizards of the Coast (1997–2000)

TSR, Inc. (Tactical Studies Rules) was an American game publishing company, best known as the original publisher of Dungeons & Dragons (D&D). Its earliest incarnation was founded in October 1973 by Gary Gygax and Don Kaye. Gygax had been unable to find a publisher for D&D, a new type of game he and Dave Arneson were co-developing, so he founded the new company with Kaye to self-publish their products. Needing financing to bring their new game to market, Gygax and Kaye brought in Brian Blume in December as an equal partner. Dungeons & Dragons is generally considered the first tabletop role-playing game (TTRPG), and established the genre. When Kaye died suddenly in 1975, the Tactical Studies Rules partnership restructured into TSR Hobbies, Inc. and accepted investment from Blume's father Melvin. With the popular D&D as its main product, TSR Hobbies became a major force in the games industry by the late 1970s. Melvin Blume eventually transferred his shares to his other son Kevin, making the two Blume brothers the largest shareholders in TSR Hobbies.

TSR Hobbies ran into financial difficulties in the spring of 1983, prompting the company to split into four independent businesses, with game publishing and development continuing as TSR, Inc. (TSR). After losing their executive positions, the Blume brothers subsequently sold their shares to TSR Vice President Lorraine Williams, who in turn engineered Gygax's ouster from the company in October 1985. TSR saw prosperity under Williams, but encountered financial trouble in the mid-1990s. While their overall sales and revenue were healthy, TSR's high costs meant the company nevertheless became unprofitable and deeply in debt. TSR was left unable to cover its publishing costs due to a variety of factors. Facing insolvency, TSR was purchased in 1997 by Wizards of the Coast (WotC). WotC initially continued using the TSR name for D&D products, but by 2000, the TSR moniker was dropped, coinciding with the release of the 3rd edition of Dungeons & Dragons.

WotC allowed the TSR trademark to expire in the early 2000s. Two other companies have since used the TSR trademark commercially.

== History ==
=== Tactical Studies Rules (1973–1975) ===
Tactical Studies Rules
- Original logo of Tactical Studies Rules: the entwined initials of founders Gary Gygax and Don Kaye
- Industry: Role-playing game publisher
- Founded: 1973
- Defunct: 1975
- Fate: dissolved
- Successor: TSR Hobbies, Inc.
- Headquarters: Lake Geneva, Wisconsin, United States
- Key people: Gary Gygax, Don Kaye, Brian Blume
- Products: Dungeons & Dragons

Tactical Studies Rules (TSR) was formed in 1973 as a partnership between Gary Gygax and Don Kaye, who collected together $2,400 for costs related to startup, to formally publish and sell the rules of Dungeons & Dragons, the creation of Gygax and Dave Arneson and the first modern role-playing game (RPG). The first TSR release, however, was Cavaliers and Roundheads, a miniature game, to start generating income for TSR. The partnership was subsequently joined by Brian Blume in December 1973. Blume was admitted to the partnership to fund further publishing of D&D, as Cavaliers and Roundheads was not a commercial success. In the original configuration of the partnership, Kaye served as president, Blume as vice-president, and Gygax as editor.

In January 1974, TSR—with Gygax using his basement as a headquarters—produced 1,000 copies of D&D, selling them for $10 each (and the required extra dice for another $3.50 - equivalent to about $88 in 2025). This first print sold out in 10 months. In January 1975, TSR printed a second batch of 1,000 copies of D&D, which took only another five or six months to sell out. Also in 1974, TSR published Warriors of Mars, a miniatures rules book set in the fantasy world of Barsoom, originally imagined by Edgar Rice Burroughs in his series of novels about John Carter of Mars, to which Gygax paid homage in the preface of the first edition of D&D. However, Gygax and TSR published the Mars book without permission from (or payment to) the Burroughs estate. Warriors of Mars was quietly dropped from the catalog and never reprinted.

When Don Kaye died of a heart attack on January 31, 1975, his role was taken over by his wife Donna Kaye, who remained responsible for accounting, shipping, and the records of the partnership through the summer. By the summer of 1975, those duties became complex enough that Gygax himself became a full-time employee of the partnership in order to take them over from Donna Kaye. Arneson also entered the partnership in order to coordinate research and design with his circle in the Twin Cities.

=== TSR Hobbies, Inc. (1975–1983) ===
TSR Hobbies, Inc.
- Industry: Role-playing game publisher
- Founded: 1975
- Defunct: 1983
- Fate: Split up
- Successor: TSR, Inc., TSR Ventures, TSR International and TSR Entertainment Corporation
- Headquarters: Lake Geneva, Wisconsin, United States
- Key people: Gary Gygax, Brian Blume, Kevin Blume
- Products: Dungeons & Dragons
- Subsidiaries: Greenfield Needlewomen

Brian Blume and Gary Gygax reorganized the business from a partnership to a corporation called TSR Hobbies, Inc. At first, it was a separate company to market miniatures and games from other companies, an enterprise which was also connected to the opening of the Dungeon hobby shop in Lake Geneva. TSR Hobbies then moved to buy out the old TSR partnership's assets. Brian's father, Melvin Blume, invested $20,000 in the nascent company which enabled it to buy out Donna Kaye's share of the original TSR partnership. On September 26, 1975, the assets of the former partnership were transferred to TSR Hobbies. Brian Blume became the largest shareholder, Melvin Blume the second largest, and Gary Gygax the third largest. Gygax served as president of TSR Hobbies, and Blume as vice president and secretary. The Dungeon hobby shop would become the effective headquarters of the company, including the offices of Blume and Gygax. TSR Hobbies subcontracted the printing and assembly work in October 1975, and the third printing of 2,000 copies of D&D sold out in five months. Tim Kask was hired in the autumn of 1975 as Periodicals Editor, and the first employee that TSR hired for full-time work.

Empire of the Petal Throne was the first game product released by TSR Hobbies, followed by two D&D supplements, Greyhawk and Blackmoor. Also released in 1975 were the board game Dungeon! and the Wild West RPG Boot Hill. The company took $300,000 in revenues for the fiscal year of 1976. TSR started hosting the Gen Con Game Fair in 1976, and the first D&D open tournament was held at the convention that year. D&D supplements Eldritch Wizardry and Gods, Demi-Gods & Heroes were released in 1976. Also in 1976, the company opened The Dungeon Hobby Shop at 723 Williams Street and TSR Hobbies moved out of Gygax's home and into the building, with its offices upstairs from the hobby shop.

TSR also began to branch the Dungeons & Dragons product into two: Dungeons & Dragons as a general audience product intended for novices, and Advanced Dungeons & Dragons (AD&D) for a more complicated product aimed at hardcore fans. In 1977, the Dungeons & Dragons Basic Set was released for D&D, and the Monster Manual was released as the initial product for AD&D, making TSR the first game company to publish a hardbound book. The next year, the AD&D Players Handbook was published, followed by a series of six adventure modules. Due to the inclusion of the word "Advanced" in the title, TSR did not pay Dave Arneson any royalties on AD&D products, saying his co-creation rights extended to the base D&D name only. In late 1978, TSR Hobbies and the Dungeon Hobby Shop moved from 723 Williams Street into downtown Lake Geneva, to 772 West Main Street, with its offices once again located above the hobby shop. In 1979, the AD&D Dungeon Masters Guide was published, and radio ads featuring "Morley the Wizard" were broadcast, a figure created "as the poster child for the softer, child-friendly image" promoted at that time. All of these core books would go on to be major hits; the D&D Basic Set sold well in 1977 and 1978, would sell over 100,000 copies in 1979, and would continue to be updated and re-released for years.

During this era, there were a number of competitors and unofficial supplements to D&D published, arguably in violation of TSR's copyright, which many D&D players used alongside the TSR books. Among these were the Arduin Grimoire, the Manual of Aurenia, and variants such as Warlock and Tunnels & Trolls. TSR regarded these very warily, and in cases where they felt their trademarks were being misused, they issued cease-and-desist letters. More often than not, this legal posturing resulted in only slight changes to competitors' works, but caused significant animosity in the community.

In 1979, TSR signed a contract with Random House with unusual terms. In most deals between publishers and distributors, publishers are paid directly based on books sold downstream by the distributor to bookstores. In TSR's contract, however, Random House would loan money to TSR as an advance upon shipment of product from TSR to Random House, a loan equivalent to 27.3% of the suggested retail price. The arrangement was mutually beneficial at first: TSR could acquire money up front to fund their work, and not have to worry about immediate sales. Many of TSR's products had consistent sales over time, and the loans allowed the company to recoup the investment immediately and use the funds to make more books. Returns were generally low, leading to Random House's confidence in TSR. However, the arrangement would cause trouble later in the 1990s.

Gygax granted exclusive rights to Games Workshop to distribute TSR products in the United Kingdom, after meeting with Ian Livingstone and Steve Jackson. Games Workshop printed some original material and also printed their own versions of various D&D and AD&D titles in order to avoid high import costs. TSR was unable to reach an agreement with Games Workshop regarding a possible merger, so the company created the subsidiary TSR Hobbies UK Ltd, in 1980. Gygax hired Don Turnbull to lead the subsidiary, which would expand into continental Europe during the 1980s. TSR UK published a series of modules and the original Fiend Folio. TSR UK also produced Imagine magazine for 31 issues.

The first-published campaign setting for AD&D, the World of Greyhawk, was introduced in 1980. The espionage role-playing game Top Secret came out in 1980; reportedly, a note regarding a fictitious assassination plot on TSR stationery, as part of the playtesting of the new game, prompted the FBI to visit TSR's offices. That same year, the Role Playing Game Association was founded to promote skillful roleplaying and unite players around the country. In 1981, Inc. magazine listed TSR Hobbies among the hundred fastest-growing privately held U.S. companies. That same year, TSR Hobbies moved its offices again, into a former medical supply building with a warehouse attached. In 1982, TSR Hobbies broke the 20 million sales mark.

TSR Hobbies terminated Grenadier Miniatures's license in 1982 and began to directly manufacture an AD&D miniatures line, followed by a toy line. Part of the licensing of the AD&D toy line went to LJN. Also that year, TSR introduced the Gangbusters and Star Frontiers role-playing games. TSR established exclusive distribution for the D&D game in 1982 in 22 countries, with the game being translated first into French, followed by many other languages. In 1982, TSR established an educational department with the intention of developing curriculum programs for reading, math, history, and problem solving, with the most successful program among these the Endless Quest series of game books.

Melvin Blume's shares were later transferred to his son Kevin Blume. After this, the leadership of TSR consisted of Kevin Blume, Brian Blume, and Gary Gygax. In contemporary articles from the early 1980s, Gygax said that the three worked as a team, and only proceeded with unanimous consent and buy-in. In interviews years later, Gygax downplayed his role, and described his position as primarily a powerless figurehead CEO, with Brian Blume as president of creative affairs and Kevin Blume as president of operations. In 1981, TSR Hobbies had revenues of $12.9 million and a payroll of 130.

TSR Hobbies diversified by purchasing or starting new commercial ventures such as producing miniatures, expanding into toys and gifts, and adding an entertainment division to explore getting into films and television. Many parts of this expansion were later criticized as bad investments and over-extension. Greenfield Needlewomen, a needle craft business, was one particularly criticized acquisition; it was owned by a cousin of the Blumes. Sales of D&D-themed needlecraft were abysmal, and the acquisition was criticized as nepotism. The company was similarly accused of favoring friends and relatives of the Blumes and Gygax in hiring. The management also used company funds to raise a shipwreck from Geneva Lake for no clear financial benefit. The company acquired the trademark and copyrights of the magazine Amazing Stories, although it had only ten thousand subscribers.

==== Wargames ====
Another acquisition was the 1982 takeover of Simulations Publications Inc. (SPI), one of the major publishers of wargames and wargaming magazines in North America. SPI was heavily in debt, and TSR agreed to give them a promissory note for several hundred thousand dollars, using SPI's assets as collateral. SPI immediately used the money to pay off its debts, leaving it cash-poor but debt-free. Less than two weeks later, TSR called in the note; with no cash on hand, SPI was forced to hand over their operation to TSR. Believing the wargame market to be a lucrative opportunity, TSR immediately released several SPI titles that were ready for publication but had been stranded by a lack of money for printing, such as Battle Over Britain and A Gleam of Bayonets. TSR also reboxed and republished several popular SPI titles from the mid-1970s under the TSR logo, including Air War, Blue & Gray, and Napoleon's Last Battles. But TSR soon learned that the main reason for SPI's large debt was that the wargame market had collapsed. When their wargames failed to sell, TSR halted all new game projects; in reaction, most SPI game designers resigned and moved to rival company Avalon Hill, lured by the formation of a subsidiary specifically for them called Victory Games. TSR published a few wargames created by their own in-house designers, and had a hit with The Hunt for Red October, but ten years after the SPI takeover, TSR abandoned the wargame market.

=== TSR (1983–1985) ===
In 1983, the company was split into four companies: TSR, Inc. (the primary successor), TSR International, TSR Ventures, and TSR Entertainment, Inc.

Gygax left for Hollywood to found TSR Entertainment, Inc., later Dungeons & Dragons Entertainment Corp., which attempted to license D&D products to movie and television executives. His work eventually led to only a single license for what later became the Dungeons & Dragons cartoon. This series was the lead program in its time slot for two years.

TSR, Inc. started publication of the Dragonlance saga in 1984 after being in development for two years. The series was both a set of modules and supplements designed for running campaigns in an entirely new game world, starting with Dragons of Despair, as well as a novel series. The novel series was written by Margaret Weis and Tracy Hickman. The Dragonlance trilogy of novels was a colossal hit; Dragons of Autumn Twilight, the first novel in the series, reached the top of The New York Times Best Seller list, encouraging TSR to a launch a long series of paperback novels. TSR's Books Department would go on to launch novels on its other D&D settings as well, and be one of TSR's most profitable divisions.

In 1984, TSR was able to make licensing agreements that allowed the company to publish the Marvel Super Heroes, Indiana Jones, and Conan role-playing games. In an attempt to diversify away from role-playing games and find a wider audience, TSR published several family board games, including All My Children, which was based on ABC's daytime soap opera, and sold over 150,000 copies; Crosscheck, a combination of Scrabble and crossword puzzles; and Spy Ring, a party game.

In 1985, Gen Con moved out of Lake Geneva which had given it its name, and relocated to Milwaukee, Wisconsin where the game convention would have more badly needed additional space. The Oriental Adventures hardback for AD&D was released that same year, becoming the biggest seller for 1985.

In 1986, TSR began publishing the bi-monthly Dungeon Adventures magazine, featuring only adventure scenarios for D&D.

==== Management turmoil ====
Sales of the core rule books and boxed sets crested in 1983 and fell in 1984 and 1985, largely due to market saturation; customers who wanted rulebooks largely already had them. There were bright spots in 1983–1985 such as Dragonlance novel sales, Unearthed Arcana, and Oriental Adventures, but TSR's finances were in bad shape due to high expenses and costs that had assumed rule book sales would remain strong. The result was a cycle of layoffs and contractions in 1983–1985, as well as the Blumes negotiating a $4 million loan from American National Bank.

The struggle for financing led to board room shake-ups at the top level. TSR's line of credit was stopped by its bank, and the company was in debt to over US$1.5 million. Gygax would later say that he was in the dark as to the extent of the financial difficulties due to being in Hollywood; Ben Riggs, an author who studied TSR's history, is skeptical Gygax was truly unaware, however. Gygax returned to Wisconsin from Hollywood. In the spring of 1985, Gygax exercised an option to buy seven hundred shares of TSR stock, which combined with shares given to his son Ernie gave him 51.1% of all stock, up from around 30% before. Gygax also says he had a confrontation with the board of directors, and had the Blumes removed. Gygax now controlled TSR. Financial difficulties continued, however. Within a year of the departure of the Blumes, the company posted a net loss of US$1.5 million, resulting in layoffs of approximately 75% of the staff. Some of these staff members went on to form other prominent game companies, such as Pacesetter Ltd and Mayfair Games, or to work with Coleco's video game division.

Gygax searched for financing. Flint Dille, one of his contacts he made in his time in Hollywood, suggested his sister Lorraine Williams might be interested in investing money into TSR. Williams was given a position of general manager at TSR and attempted to fix TSR's precarious financial situation. This led to clashes between Williams and Gygax, who resisted some of Williams' suggestions. Meanwhile, the Blumes, out of power at the company and worried about its financial strength in the long-term, sought to cash out their shares. They offered to sell their shares to Gygax, but he refused. They exercised their own options to buy seven hundred more shares, then sold their entire holdings to Lorraine Williams instead. Williams herself bought fifty shares. With these purchases, Williams became the majority shareholder of TSR, and used her voting power to depose Gygax as CEO and president on October 22, 1985. Gygax unsuccessfully challenged the sale in court; Gygax's supporters considered the Blumes' sale an act of retaliation. Gygax eventually sold his remaining stock to Williams and used the capital to form New Infinities Productions. On TSR's side, they would pepper Gygax with legal threats long after he left in an attempt to deter him from competing with his old company in the area of role-playing games.

=== Lorraine Williams era (1985–1997) ===
Williams saw potential for rebuilding the debt-plagued company into a highly profitable one. However, she also acquired a reputation as a non-gamer who played the "villain" in retrospectives of TSR. Gary Gygax grew particularly disdainful of her; Williams' habit of threatening lawsuits and legal action against perceived foes was criticized as unwise and turning potential allies into enemies. However, her tenure has also been defended. John D. Rateliff said that "Every single person I talked to who worked under Gary [Gygax] and the Blumes and then worked under Lorraine preferred working under Lorraine... I never met a single person who was under both who didn't prefer being under her." Jeff Grubb said that she "pretty much saved the company", as the company was weeks away from total collapse when she took over.

==== Tabletop and board gaming in the Williams era ====
TSR released the Forgotten Realms campaign setting in 1987, which would go on to become one of the most popular settings for D&D. TSR's settings would generally include a boxed set with multiple paperbacks and a map as their core product, and would produce tie-in supplements such as pre-made adventures (usually called "modules"), guides to regions within the world, and novels. Also in 1987, a small design team began working to develop a second edition of the AD&D game. In 1988, TSR released the Bullwinkle and Rocky Role-Playing Party Game, complete with a spinner and hand puppets. That same year, TSR released the wargame The Hunt for Red October based on Tom Clancy's novel The Hunt for Red October, which became one of the all-time biggest selling wargames. In 1989, AD&D 2nd edition was released, which saw a new Dungeon Master's Guide, Player's Handbook, and the first three volumes of the new Monstrous Compendium. A new campaign setting, Spelljammer, was also released in 1989, which allowed characters from one D&D world to travel to other worlds via space galleons in an Age of Sail themed setting. TSR would go on to produce many expansions for 2nd edition, such as a series of class handbooks that began with The Complete Fighter's Handbook.

In 1990, the Ravenloft setting was released, a horror-themed setting for AD&D. Ravenloft had been introduced in an acclaimed 1983 adventure module, and was now expanded into an entire setting. In 1991, TSR released the Dark Sun campaign setting, which was more dark fantasy in genre, and set on a post-apocalyptic desert world threatened by evil life-draining wizards and psionicists. In 1992, TSR released the Al-Qadim setting with a Middle Eastern flavor similar to a fantasy version of the Arabian Nights, although its world was also connected to the Forgotten Realms. In 1993, a revised version of the Forgotten Realms Campaign Setting for 2nd edition was released; TSR had published a sourcebook on upgrading the 1st edition material to 2nd edition in 1990 earlier. In 1993, DragonStrike was released as an introductory product aimed to recruit new role-players, including a half-hour video which explained role-playing concepts; a similar introductory product, First Quest, was released in 1994. Also in 1994, the Planescape campaign setting was released, featuring the city of Sigil as the "City of Doors" that connected to the various planes of existence in AD&D. Spelljammer had not been considered a success by TSR as players perceived it as mainly a way to move characters from one world to another rather than its own setting; Planescape attempted to remedy this by focusing on Sigil as a place to set an entire campaign, rather than a place to pass through. TSR also released Karameikos: Kingdom of Adventure in 1994, which detailed one of the kingdoms in the setting of Mystara. As an innovation, it included an audio CD with tracks of dialogue and sound effects. In 1995, TSR released Birthright, a campaign setting that mixed D&D with strategy games. The intent was for players to play noble characters empowered by divine blood which gave them the power to rule domains; players could expand their domains and divine powers with a mixture of war and diplomacy. In 1996, Dragonlance: Fifth Age was released, a "diceless" role-playing game that departed from the roots of Dragonlance in AD&D.

==== Expansion into other products ====
Under Williams' direction, TSR solidified its expansion into other fields, such as magazines, paperback fiction, comic books, and collectible games. TSR's book division was a traditional powerhouse for the company, especially due to the comparatively low costs in producing novels compared to role-playing supplements which required commissioning art and play-testing. The most notably successful novel series of the era was R. A. Salvatore's Drizzt series, set in the Forgotten Realms. Starting with The Crystal Shard in 1988, many of Salvatore's books would go on to reach the paperback bestseller lists. TSR eventually moved into publishing hardcover novels as well with Salvatore's The Legacy, published in 1992. It made the top of The New York Times Best Seller list weeks after its release.

The Dille Family Trust, of which Lorraine Williams was a part, held the rights to the Buck Rogers license. Williams personally encouraged TSR to produce Buck Rogers tie-in material. TSR would end up publishing Buck Rogers board games, novels, a comic book, and a role-playing game based on the AD&D 2nd Edition rules. TSR's Buck Rogers projects were commercial failures.

In the late 1980s, TSR opened a new West Coast division in Southern California to develop various projects in the entertainment industry, similar to how Gygax had sought deals in Hollywood in the early 1980s. However, the efforts of the division would come to "less than nothing" according to TSR historian Ben Riggs, despite initial promise. TSR had an arrangement with DC Comics to produce the comics Advanced Dungeons & Dragons and Forgotten Realms, which sold well and were profitable for both DC and TSR. Sensing an opportunity, TSR decided to produce comics themselves as a stepping stool to television and film, as comics were cheaper to produce and start with. However, they had already sold the rights to their own A-list product in AD&D. TSR attempted to not enrage DC Comics by calling their new product "comics modules" and including game-related material at the end of each issue; additionally, TSR largely sold the comics modules through bookshops rather than comic shops. The compromise failed in both directions: DC, feeling betrayed that their partner was moving to become a competitor, immediately stopped production of both the AD&D and Forgotten Realms comics, and canceled an in-production Ravenloft series to have been scripted by Knight of the Black Rose author James Lowder. However, the changes to present the product as not a comic book caused the potential audience to either not know of its existence at all, or to be confused as to its nature. TSR West eventually published four comics modules: a Buck Rogers comic, a sci-fi comic Intruder, a time travel comic Warhawks, and a horror comic called R.I.P. They were not commercially successful. TSR West closed around 1991, although TSR would continue to work with Flint Dille on film-adjacent products made in California such as the introductory video for Dragonstrike and a 1995 interactive video game series called Terror T.R.A.X. In 1994, TSR signed an agreement with Sweetpea Entertainment for rights to make a D&D movie. This would eventually result in the 2000 Dungeons & Dragons movie.

TSR continued to own and operate the Gen Con role-playing game convention. Gen Con grew beyond its initial focus on D&D and wargames to role-playing fans in general. Gen Con was a growing and successful convention; in 1992, it broke every previous record for attendance to game conventions in the United States, with over 18,000 attendees.

In 1993, Wizards of the Coast released the game Magic: The Gathering at Gen Con, which was an immediate smash hit that established the collectible card game (CCG) genre. TSR's Jim Ward led a development effort to create a Dungeons & Dragons-themed CCG competitor that would be a response to Magic. The result would be Spellfire, released in April 1994. Spellfire was produced on a shoestring budget, and re-used art that TSR had already commissioned for other projects; Lorraine Williams was not a fan of the project. Its financial results are contested; some TSR insiders say that Spellfire sold well considering the constraints on it, while others indicate it sold poorly. Spellfire was discontinued in 1996, although one final release occurred in late 1997. Another collectible competitor to Wizards of the Coast that TSR produced was Dragon Dice, which was released in 1995. Dragon Dice was a collectible dice game where each player started with a random assortment of basic dice, and could improve their assortment by purchasing booster packs of more powerful dice. The first sets of Dragon Dice sold well at games stores, and TSR produced several expansion sets. However, interest in Dragon Dice was waning. In addition, TSR tried to aggressively market Dragon Dice in mass-market book stores through Random House. However, the game did not catch on through the book trade.

TSR's book division ran into troubles in the mid-1990s. TSR engaged in disputes with some of its most successful authors over terms and remuneration. Weis & Hickman had been driven off in the mid-1980s; a new dispute with R. A. Salvatore happened in 1994–1995. TSR suffered "the effects of overexpansion" in 1996 with an "expanded number of hardcover novels and a wide array of gaming accessories such as its Dragon Dice". Part of this overexpansion included publishing twelve hardcover novels, up from the usual two novels per year. Shannon Appelcline, in Designers & Dragons: The 90s, commented that the books were sold at a loss and the "TSR warehouse" was "truckloads" full of Dragon Dice.

==== Final years: Financial trouble and sale (1995–1997) ====
By 1996, TSR was experiencing numerous problems, as outlined by various historians of the company. Shannon Appelcline wrote: "Distributors were going out of business. TSR had unbalanced their AD&D game through a series of lucrative supplements that ultimately hurt the long-time viability of the game. Meanwhile, they had developed so many settings—many of them popular and well received—that they were both cannibalizing their only sales and discouraging players from picking up settings that might be gone in a few years. They may have been cannibalizing their own sales through excessive production of books or supplements too." Ben Riggs agreed that TSR was factionalizing the AD&D audience by continually releasing competing new settings (Forgotten Realms, Al-Qadim, Dragonlance, Planescape, Dark Sun, Birthright, Karameikos, etc.), a strategy intended to lure in new customers, but that actually divided its own core customers. TSR's products essentially competed with themselves, requiring more development effort to reach the same number of total customers. Ryan Dancey and Lisa Stevens, who examined TSR's finances for Wizards of the Coast, found that many of the AD&D settings products were never profitable, and more worryingly never could have been profitable—the cost of production was simply too high compared to the price they sold for. David M. Ewalt writes that Spellfire and Dragon Dice "were both expensive to produce, and neither sold very well".

Another factor that hobbled TSR in the long-term was a financial arrangement known as "factoring". Factoring worked like this: TSR first arranged contracts with retailers in the hobby trade (gaming stores, comics stores, and so on) to preorder their products and offered a discounted rate for contracts signed in January. TSR then took these contracts to investment banks, and was advanced money immediately by the banks, with the banks to be paid off from the eventual sales of the product. This financial innovation allowed TSR to be essentially "paid in advance", less fees from the banks and from discounts given to suppliers, which worked out to keeping about 82% of the revenue. Getting all of the money in January allowed TSR to budget with more certainty and potentially fund projects with a long lead time immediately, rather than waiting on sales. Other than the direct cost of losing 18 pennies on every dollar of revenue, factoring had the other downside of not being flexible to changing market conditions, as TSR was essentially locked into its budgeting from January. It was partially why Spellfire was made on a tiny budget, as TSR was attempting to take on a new initiative in the middle of the year, and led to a fiasco with its Advanced Dungeons & Dragons CD-ROM Core Rules product where a preorder arrangement with Babbage's was continued despite Babbage's becoming financially insolvent.

TSR's old deal with Random House, which had been mutually beneficial in the 1980s, began to be used by TSR in ways that would paper over short-term financial problems. Since TSR was paid up front on the assumption that shipped goods would ultimately sell, TSR began shipping overstock to Random House to generate loans on demand. This caused people in the know at TSR to call it the "Banco de Random House". It also dulled TSR's internal sense of which products were selling, leading to overprinting of niche products. Ben Riggs cites the introductory product DragonStrike as an example, which sold well but was vastly overprinted. The extra copies were still sent to Random House to generate loans, however. The result was a steadily expanding "debt bubble" with Random House as returns of product soared. Random House eventually noticed something was amiss, and began demanding TSR shrink its debt load with them—around $11.8 million in June 1995. Random House sued TSR in April 1996 for repayment.

Despite total sales of around $40 million in 1995, TSR ended 1996 with little in cash reserves, and the company was deep in debt. Random House returned an unexpectedly high percentage of unsold stock, including the year's inventory of unsold novels and sets of Dragon Dice, and charged a fee of several million dollars. Random House returned around $14 million of product between 1995 and 1997. TSR found itself in a cash crunch. With no cash, TSR was unable to pay their printing and shipping bills. J. B. Kenehan, the logistics company that handled TSR's pre-press, printing, warehousing, and shipping, refused to do any more work. Since the logistics company had the production plates for key products such as core D&D books, there was no means of printing or shipping core products to generate income or secure short-term financing. The company laid off thirty staff members in December 1996, and other employees including Jim Ward quit over disagreements about how the company managed the crisis. In large part due to the need to refund Random House, TSR began 1997 more than $30 million in debt. TSR was threatened by lawsuits due to unpaid freelancers as well as missing royalties, but TSR made sufficient earnings from products already shipped to stores to keep their remaining staff paid through the first half of 1997. With no viable financial plan for TSR's survival, Lorraine Williams sold the company to Wizards of the Coast in 1997 in a deal brokered by Five Rings Publishing Group (FRPG).

=== After acquisition (1997–2000) ===
Wizards of the Coast settled TSR's debts as part of the acquisition. This included unwinding TSR's deal with its printer, enabling the products TSR had worked on in the first half of 1997 to be printed and distributed, such as the space opera game Alternity. More generally, Wizards was cash-rich, which solved some of the problems TSR had faced that had caused it to resort to the rolling loans and financial trickery that had cut into TSR's profits, such as factoring. Wizards of the Coast also moved to mend relations with some of TSR's former employees and contractors who had been alienated. This included allowing artists to take back personal ownership of the original versions of art they had made for TSR.

Wizards eventually closed the TSR corporate offices in Lake Geneva. Some TSR employees accepted the offer of transferring to Wizards of the Coast's offices in Washington, and a few others continued to work remotely from Wisconsin. Wizards of the Coast continued to use the TSR name for D&D products for three years. Wizards also set about the creation of the third edition of Dungeons & Dragons. It was released in 2000 under the Wizards of the Coast brand only. In 1999, Wizards of the Coast was itself purchased by Hasbro, Inc. In 2002, the Gen Con convention was sold to Peter Adkison, the founder and CEO of Wizards of the Coast.

== Business disputes ==
After its initial success faded, the company turned to legal defenses of what it regarded as its intellectual property. In addition, there were several legal cases brought regarding who had invented what within the company and the division of royalties, including several lawsuits against Gygax. This included the company threatening to sue individuals supplying game material on websites.

In 1984, there was an incident involving Lucasfilm that led to a legend that TSR had trademarked the term "Nazi". TSR published a supplement for the Indiana Jones RPG, Raiders of the Lost Ark Adventure Pack, in which some figures were marked with "Nazi™". This trademark notation was because of a list of trademarked character names supplied by Lucasfilm's legal department; they had indiscriminately marked all figures with a trademark symbol, and the Nazi figures were likewise marked accidentally.

== Subsequent trademark usage ==
=== TSR Games/Solarian Games (2011–2021) ===
In 2011, a new company taking the name TSR was founded by Jayson Elliot, who co-founded the Roll for Initiative podcast. Elliot found that the TSR trademark had expired around 2004 so he registered it himself. He then decided to launch the new company with assistance from early TSR/D&D contributors including Luke and Ernie Gygax, sons of the deceased D&D co-creator Gary Gygax, and Tim Kask, former editor of Dragon magazine. Their first product was Gygax Magazine, announced along with the TSR company revival in December 2012. Wired reported that "Elliot stressed that his 'TSR is a new company'." Both Gygax brothers left the company in 2016 when the magazine ended. The company operated as TSR Games, producing the Top Secret: New World Order role-playing game.

=== TSR Games (2021–2023) ===
In June 2021, a new, separate TSR company was launched by a group including Ernie Gygax, Justin LaNasa and Stephen Dinehart. The company is based out of Lake Geneva, Wisconsin; they announced plans to release tabletop games and operate the Dungeon Hobby Shop Museum, which is located in the first office building of the original TSR. Elliot's TSR Games then announced on social media that while they have owned the trademark since 2011, they missed a filing date in 2020 and were considering various options. However, after Ernie Gygax's "troubling comments about race, gender identity, and gun violence, as well as his company's reaction", Elliot announced that his company would not have "any form of working relationship" with Ernie Gygax's TSR. Ultimately, Elliot's TSR Games was rebranded as Solarian Games in July 2021. Dinehart then rebranded as Wonderfilled Games. Dicebreaker reported that "TSR Games never officially announced its rebranding as Wonderfilled Games" and most of its "Twitter accounts had been locked down or nuked, and the company's old website simply redirected to a new page that—interestingly—listed Dinehart's GiantLands as an in-development title. [...] How much of TSR Games exists in Wonderfilled Games isn't clear".

LaNasa's TSR Games then launched a crowdfunding campaign in December 2021 to raise money to sue Wizards of the Coast for "Trademark Declaratory Judgement of Ownership"; the company then filed and voluntarily dismissed the complaint that month. Wizards of the Coast, also in December 2021, sued LaNasa's TSR for trademark fraud over the use of the TSR logo which is owned by Wizards of the Coast. In July 2022, TechRaptor reported on a leaked Star Frontiers: New Genesis (a reboot of the 1982 Star Frontiers role-playing game) playtest created by LaNasa's TSR; the content contains "blatantly racist" descriptions of character races and the race design "plays into Nazi eugenics". The content also contains "homophobic, transphobic, and anti-semitic content, as well as additional material of a discriminatory nature". IGN Southeast Asia highlighted that in this playtest game a black "race is classified as a 'Subrace' and having 'average' intellect with a maximum intelligence rating of 9, whereas the 'norse' race has a minimum intelligence rating of 13".

In September 2022, Wizards of the Coast sued TSR Games—helmed by Ernie Gygax and LaNasa—and the Dungeon Hobby Shop Museum to enjoin these companies from publishing games under the "Star Frontiers" and "TSR" trademarks. In its motion for a preliminary injunction, Wizards of the Coast wrote that TSR's Star Frontiers: New Genesis game is "despicable" and "blatantly racist and transphobic", and that the publication of such content would inflict reputational harm on Wizards of the Coast. Charlie Hall, for Polygon, commented that "Wizards' filing also seeks to undermine LaNasa's most powerful argument—that Wizards abandoned TSR and other related trademarks, thus opening the door to his usurping of the brand and its games. [...] Here's where things get complicated. Wizards admitted that it failed to file paperwork for the registration of TSR, Star Frontiers, and other related marks in a timely fashion as required under federal law. But through continued sales of related products and use of the related IP, the company claims ownership via 'common law trademark rights.' It will be up to a jury to determine if that is, in fact, the case". In December 2022, a federal magistrate judge denied the preliminary injunction Wizards of the Coast filed. The judge said that Wizards had not yet shown enough evidence to demonstrate continuous use of the TSR brand; she also noted that the defendants disclaimed the racist version of the game and had promised not to release any version of Star Frontiers at all until the court case concludes, hence there was no need for a preliminary injunction. In June 2023, LaNasa's TSR declared Chapter 7 bankruptcy, which triggered an automatic stay of the lawsuit.

== Products ==
TSR's main products were role-playing games, the most successful of which was D&D. However, they also produced other games such as card games, board games, and dice games, and published both magazines and books.

=== Role-playing games ===
- Alternity (1998)
- Amazing Engine (1993)
- Boot Hill (1975)
- Buck Rogers Adventure Game (1993)
- Buck Rogers XXVc (1988)
- Bullwinkle and Rocky Role-Playing Party Game (1988)
- Conan Role-Playing Game (1985)
- Crimefighters (1981)
- Dragonlance: Fifth Age (Saga System) (1996)
- Dragonstrike (board game and VHS tutorial) (1993)
- Dungeons & Dragons (1974)
- Empire of the Petal Throne (1975)
- Gamma World (1978)
- Gangbusters (1982)
- Indiana Jones (1984)
- Marvel Super Heroes (1984)
- Marvel Super Heroes Adventure Game (Saga System) (1998)
- Metamorphosis Alpha (1976)
- Star Frontiers (1982)
- Top Secret (1980) and Top Secret/S.I.

=== Wargames ===
==== Published under TSR marque ====
- Cavaliers and Roundheads (1973)
- Chainmail (1975)
- Classic Warfare (1975)
- Star Probe (1975)
- Fight in the Skies (1976)
- Panzer Warfare (1975)
- Star Empires (1977)
- Battle Over Britain (1983, developed by SPI, published as TSR game)
- A Gleam of Bayonets: The Battle of Antietam (1983, developed by SPI, published as TSR game)
- Air War (1983, reboxed version of 1977 SPI game)
- Blue & Gray (1983, reboxed version of 1985 SPI game)
- Napoleon's Last Battles (1983, reboxed version of 1976 SPI game)
- RDF: Rapid Deployment Force (1983)
- The Twilight War (1984)
- Julius Caesar: Game of the Gallic Wars (1985)
- Remember the Maine! The Spanish-American War, 1898 (1986)
- Barbarossa: Game of the Russo-German War 1941-45 (1986)
- Rebel Sabers: Civil War Cavalry Battles (1986)
- Sniper! (1986, revision of 1973 SPI game)
- La Grande Armee: Campaigns of Napoleon, 1805-1815 (1987)
- Hetzer (1987)
- Onslaught (1987)
- The Hunt for Red October (1988)
- Bug Hunter (1988)
- Red Storm Rising (1989)
- Europe Aflame (1989)
- Battle of Britain (1990)
- A Line in the Sand: The Battle of Iraq (1991)

==== Published under SPI marque ====
- World War II: European Theater of Operations (1985)
- Moscow 1941: The Enemy at the Gates (1987)
- World War II: Pacific Theater of Operations (1991)

==== Published in Strategy & Tactics (1983–1987) ====
- Iwo Jima: Valor of Arms (#92)
- American Civil War 1861–1865 (#93)
- Nord Kapp (#94)
- Soldiers of the Queen: Battles at Isandhlwana and Omdurman (#95)
- Singapore (#96)
- Trail of the Fox (#97)
- Central Command: Superpower Confrontation in the Straits of Hormuz (#98)
- Thunder at Luetzen: Opening Battles for Germany, 1813 (#99)
- Superpowers at War (#100)
- Cromwell's Victory: The Battle of Marston Moor (#101)
- Monty's D-Day (#102)
- The Road to Vicksburg: The Battle of Champion Hill (#103)
- 13: The Colonies in Revolt (#104)
- Ruweisat Ridge: The First Battle of El Alamein (#105)
- Pleasant Hill: The Red River Campaign (#106)
- Warsaw Rising: Revolt of the Polish Underground, 1944 (#107)
- Target: Libya (#109)
- Hastings, 1066 (#110)

=== Other games ===
- All My Children (board game, 1985)
- Attack Force (microgame)
- The Awful Green Things from Outer Space (board game, 1979)
- Blood Wars (collectible card game, 1995)
- Buck Rogers – Battle for the 25th Century (board game, 1988)
- Buck Rogers – Conquest of the 25th Century (play-by-mail game, 1990)
- Chase (board game)
- Crosscheck (board game, 1985)
- Crosse (board game)
- Divine Right (board game)
- Dragonlance (board game)
- Dragon Strike (board game, 1993)
- Dragon Dice (collectible dice game)
- Dungeon! (1975)
- Dungeon Fantasy (1989)
- Elixir (board game)
- Endless Quest gamebooks (1982)
- Escape From New York (1981) (board game)
- Fantasy Forest (1980) (board game)
- 4th Dimension (board game)
- The Great Khan Game (card game)
- HeartQuest (game book series)
- Honeymooners Game (board game, 1986)
- Icebergs (microgame)
- Kage (board game)
- Knights of Camelot (board game)
- Maxi Bour$e (board game)
- Party Zone: Spy Ring Scenario (party game)
- Perry Mason (board game, 1987)
- Remember the Alamo
- Revolt on Antares (microgame, 1980)
- Saga (microgame)
- Spellfire (collectible card game, 1994)
- SnarfQuest (game book series) (1983)
- Snit's Revenge (boardgame) (1977)
- Steppe (board game)
- Terror T.R.A.X. (hybrid audiobook/gamebook line) (1995)
- They've Invaded Pleasantville (microgame)
- Vampyre (microgame)
- Viking Gods
- War of Wizards
- Web of Gold

=== Magazines ===
- Amazing Stories
- Dragon
- Dungeon
- Imagine
- Strategy & Tactics

=== Fiction ===
In 1984, TSR started publishing novels based on their games. Most D&D campaign settings had their own novel line, the most successful of which were the Dragonlance and Forgotten Realms lines, with dozens of novels each.

TSR also published the 1995 novel Buck Rogers: A Life in the Future by Martin Caidin, a standalone re-imagining of the Buck Rogers universe and unrelated to TSR's Buck Rogers XXVC game.

TSR published a large number of fantasy and science fiction novels unconnected with their gaming products, such as L. Dean James' "Red Kings of Wynnamyr" novels, Sorcerer's Stone (1991) and Kingslayer (1992); Mary H. Herbert's five "Gabria" novels (Valorian, Dark Horse, Lightning's Daughter, City of the Sorcerers, and Winged Magic); and humorous fantasy fiction, including Roy V. Young's "Count Yor" novels Captains Outrageous (1994) and Yor's Revenge(1995). However, such projects never represented more than a fraction of the company's fiction output, which retained a strong emphasis on game-derived works.

== See also ==
- Lake Geneva Tactical Studies Association
