= List of Dungeons & Dragons monsters (1977–94) =

The following is a list of monsters that appeared in various books and supplements for the "Basic" version of Dungeons & Dragons from the release of the first Basic Set in 1977 through expansions until the end of the line in 1994.

== 1977 version ==
=== Dungeons & Dragons Basic Rulebook (1977) ===
The Dungeons & Dragons Basic Set, edited by John Eric Holmes, was first released in 1977, as an introductory set for new players. While players were intended to go onto Advanced Dungeons & Dragons once the play options in the Basic Set were exhausted, as stated in the book, many players found they preferred the simpler play style of the basic game. The Basic Set was based upon the original work published in 1974 and three of the supplementary booklets to the original set. Much like the first edition Advanced Dungeons & Dragons Monster Manual, also released in 1977, this book collected many of the monsters from the previous D&D supplements, and included the stat lines on the same page as the monsters' descriptions. Most descriptions do not feature illustrations.

Creature	Other Appearances	Variants	Notes
Bandit	D&D Basic Rules (1981, 1983), Rules Cyclopedia (1991)		
Basilisk	D&D Boxed Set (1974), D&D Expert Rules (1981,1983), D&D Companion Rules (1984), Rules Cyclopedia (1991)		Based on the creature from medieval bestiaries. In the original Monster Manual it is described as a reptilian monster whose gaze can turn creatures to stone. AD&D's basilisk was also adapted into the Magic: The Gathering trading card game, with a depiction taken from the Monster Manual being used in a prototype version.
Berserker	D&D Basic Rules (1981,1983), Rules Cyclopedia (1991)		
Black pudding	D&D Boxed Set (1974), D&D Expert Rules (1981, 1983), Rules Cyclopedia (1991)		"D&D's large variety of monstrous oozes and slimes took their original inspiration from Irvin S. Yeathworth Jr's The Blob" movie.
Blink dogs	D&D Supplement I: Greyhawk (1975), D&D Expert Rules (1981, 1983), Rules Cyclopedia (1991)		
Bugbear	D&D Supplement I: Greyhawk (1975), D&D Basic Rules (1981, 1983), Rules Cyclopedia (1991)		Hairy cousin of the goblin, for the most part presented as inherently evil before the 5th edition of the game,
Carrion crawler	D&D Supplement I: Greyhawk (1975), D&D Basic Rules (1981, 1983), Rules Cyclopedia (1991)		
Chimera	D&D Boxed Set (1974), D&D Expert Rules (1981, 1983), Rules Cyclopedia (1991)		The chimera is based on the chimera of Greek mythology as found in the Iliad by Homer, "stronger than a centaur but weaker than a sphinx". Present in the game since the earliest edition.
Cockatrice	D&D Boxed Set (1974), D&D Expert Rules (1981, 1983), D&D Companion Rules (1984), Rules Cyclopedia (1991)		Based on the creature from medieval bestiaries.
Displacer beast	D&D Supplement I: Greyhawk (1975), D&D Expert Rules (1981, 1983), Rules Cyclopedia (1991)		A magical creature resembling a puma with a tentacle growing from each shoulder, it hates all forms of life, and always appears 3 feet from its actual position. Based on the alien Coeurl from the short story Black Destroyer by A. E. van Vogt. Rob Bricken from io9 named the displacer beast as the 2nd most memorable D&D monster.
Djinni	D&D Boxed Set (1974), D&D Expert Rules (1981, 1983), D&D Companion Rules (1984), Rules Cyclopedia (1991)		
Doppleganger	D&D Supplement I: Greyhawk (1975), D&D Basic Rules (1981, 1983), Rules Cyclopedia (1991)		
Dragon	D&D Boxed Set (1974) (White, Black, and Red), D&D Supplement I: Greyhawk (1975) (Brass), D&D Basic Rules (1981, 1983), D&D Companion Rules(1984) (larger variants), Rules Cyclopedia (1991)	White, Black, Red and Brass	Powerful and intelligent, usually winged reptiles with magical abilities and breath weapon. The different subraces, distinguished by their colouring, vary in power. The dragon has been referred to as the "iconic creature for D&D adventurers to conquer".
Dwarf	D&D Boxed Set (1974), D&D Basic Rules (1981, 1983), Rules Cyclopedia (1991)		Based on Tolkien's version of the dwarf. Often depicted as "short, stout, and fond of ale", "bearded masters of metalworking" and "predisposed towards a "good" moral alignment", "tend to embody an extreme vision of masculinity".
Elf	D&D Boxed Set (1974), D&D Basic Rules (1981, 1983), Rules Cyclopedia (1991)		Based on Tolkien's version of the elf, "quick but fragile", with senses surpassing a human's, often depicted as "effeminate" and "predisposed towards a "good" moral alignment".
Gargoyle	D&D Boxed Set (1974), D&D Basic Rules (1981, 1983), Rules Cyclopedia (1991)		AD&D's gargoyle was adapted into the Magic: The Gathering trading card game, with a depiction taken from the Monster Manual being used in a prototype version.
Gelatinous cube	D&D Supplement I: Greyhawk (1975), D&D Basic Rules (1981, 1983), Rules Cyclopedia (1991)		In the artificial dungeon environment of the game, they function as a "clean up crew". The gelatinous cube, "a living mound of gelatinous jelly", was considered especially suited for that role, as it fi exactly in the standard grid for tactical combat. Considered an "iconic monster".
Giant	D&D Boxed Set (1974) (all but Storm Giant), D&D Supplement I: Greyhawk (1975) (Storm Giant), D&D Expert Rules (1981, 1983), Rules Cyclopedia (1991)	Hill, Stone, Frost, Fire, Cloud and Storm	Overlarge powerful humanoids with a self-involved social focus, usually presented as the "bad guys". Based on mythological figures and Tolkien, their stone-throwing ability indicates their creative roots in wargaming.
Giant tick	D&D Supplement I: Greyhawk (1975)		
Gnome	D&D Boxed Set (1974), D&D Basic Rules (1981, 1983), Rules Cyclopedia (1991)		Player character race "often stereotyped as buffoons, illusionists, mad inventors, and many characters play them as intentionally "wacky" or anachronistic"; often conforms to the trickster archetype. "predisposed towards a "good" moral alignment".
Goblin	D&D Boxed Set (1974), D&D Basic Rules (1981, 1983), Rules Cyclopedia (1991)		Based primarily on the goblins portrayed in J.R.R. Tolkien's Middle-Earth. Considered one of the "five main "humanoid" races" in AD&D by Paul Karczag and Lawrence Schick. Presented as "evil" and "predisposed towards a society of brutal regimes where the strongest rule" in the game. Suitable opponent for characters of the lowest level.
Gray ooze	D&D Boxed Set (1974), D&D Basic Rules (1981, 1983), Rules Cyclopedia (1991)		
Green slime	D&D Boxed Set (1974), D&D Basic Rules (1981, 1983), Rules Cyclopedia (1991)		
Griffon	D&D Boxed Set (1974), D&D Expert Rules (1981, 1983), Rules Cyclopedia (1991)		Originally based on the creature from Persian mythology.
Harpy	D&D Supplement I: Greyhawk (1975), D&D Basic Rules (1981, 1983), Rules Cyclopedia (1991)		Based on the creature from Greek mythology. Witwer et al. viewed its artistic rendering in 5th edition as "redesigned from prior editions to entice more Dungeon Master use."
Hell hound	D&D Supplement I: Greyhawk (1975), D&D Expert Rules (1981, 1983), Rules Cyclopedia (1991)		
Hippogriff	D&D Boxed Set (1974), D&D Expert Rules (1981, 1983), Rules Cyclopedia (1991)		Originally based on the creature from Persian mythology the adapted hippogriff "was among the earliest fantasy beasts introduced into the Dungeons & Dragons universe": An artistic representation drawing inspiration from real eagles and horses was used for the cover of the third booklet of the original Dungeons & Dragons (1974) edition and became one of "the game's earlies ambassadors" through use of that cover in advertisements. Gary Gygax used a story in which he received a letter asking how many eggs a Hippogriff could lay as an example of the encyclopedic knowledge which fans expected him to have over every detail of gameplay.
Hobgoblin	D&D Boxed Set (1974), D&D Basic Rules (1981, 1983), Rules Cyclopedia (1991)		Muscular humanoids somewhat taller than humans with reddish skin and canine teeth. Mordenkainen Presents: Monsters of the Multiverse gave them a new background as a species originating in and expelled from the Feywild, while also presenting hobgoblins societies with different characteristics on different worlds, but all centered around forming close-knit groups.
Horse	D&D Expert Rules (1981, 1983), Rules Cyclopedia (1991)		
Hydra	D&D Boxed Set (1974), D&D Expert Rules (1981, 1983), Rules Cyclopedia (1991)		Based on the creature from classical sources, with Heracles' famed method of slaying it adapted into a vulnerability against fire, but not with the less well-known poisonous bite, showing how the game mostly focusses on the well-known traits of mythological creatures. Present in the game since its inception. AD&D's hydra was also adapted into the Magic: The Gathering trading card game, with a depiction taken from the Monster Manual being used in a prototype version.
Kobold	D&D Boxed Set (1974), D&D Basic Rules (1981, 1983), Rules Cyclopedia (1991)		"[S]hort subterranean lizard-men", considered one of the "five main "humanoid" races" in AD&D by Paul Karczag and Lawrence Schick, and ranked among the weakest monsters in the game by Scott Baird from Screen Rant.
Lizard man	D&D Supplement I: Greyhawk (1975), D&D Basic Rules (1981, 1983), Rules Cyclopedia (1991)		Reviewer Chris Gigoux described them by saying "Lizard Men aren't bad, [...] they're just a simple folks, struggling to survive." An image of a lizard man by Greg Bell functioned as the logo in the early phase of TSR Hobbies, while "the bloodied bodies of lizard men" overcome by a group of adventurers featured on the cover of the 1st edition Player's Handbook, considered "arguably the most iconic piece of art in all of RPGdom" by Reactor magazine commentator Saladin Ahmed.
Lycanthrope	D&D Boxed Set (1974) (all but Wererat), D&D Supplement I: Greyhawk (1975) (Wererat), D&D Basic Rules (1981, 1983), Rules Cyclopedia (1991)	Werebear, Wereboar, Wererat, Weretiger, and Werewolf	Afflicted shapechangers, whose condition could be transmitted like a disease. Depiction of the werewolf is related to those in 1930s and 1940s Hollywood movies like The Wolf Man. Ranked sixth among the ten best low-level monsters by the authors of Dungeons & Dragons For Dummies: "a classic monster", interesting due to shapechanging because "players can never be entirely sure whether that surly villager might indeed be the great black wolf who attacked their characters out in the forest." Screen Rant has described the operation of lycanthropy in the game as an aspect that "makes no sense" because it is often a positive development for a character. "It is possible for a character to be infected with lycanthropy in Dungeons & Dragons and it comes highly recommended, as the benefits outweigh the negatives". Present in the game since its inception, an image of a werewolf's face by Gygax' childhood friend Tom Keogh was "[a]lmost certainly the oldest piece of art" in the original D&D.
Manticore	D&D Boxed Set (1974), D&D Expert Rules (1981, 1983), Rules Cyclopedia (1991)		Based on its mythological counterpart, including the barbed tail, the manticore appeared in the game from its earliest edition.
Medusa	D&D Boxed Set (1974), D&D Basic Rules (1981, 1983), D&D Companion Rules (1984), Rules Cyclopedia (1991)		Based on the creature from classical sources but translated into species of monsters originated from "humans seeking eternal youth". Part of the game from its very beginning, a medusa was already depicted in the playtest material from 1973 for the original edition.
Mummy	D&D Boxed Set (1974), D&D Expert Rules (1981, 1983), Rules Cyclopedia (1991)		Based on the creature from Gothic fiction and appearances in more contemporary entertainment.
Nixie	D&D Boxed Set (1974), D&D Expert Rules (1981, 1983), Rules Cyclopedia (1991)		
Ochre jelly	D&D Boxed Set (1974), D&D Basic Rules (1981, 1983), Rules Cyclopedia (1991)		Ian Livingstone considered the ochre jelly one of the game's more "exotic and strange creatures".
Ogre	D&D Boxed Set (1974), D&D Basic Rules (1981, 1983), Rules Cyclopedia (1991)		Large, powerful humanoid creatures, with slightly below average intelligence. Typical bad guys in the game, who can be used to teach "players about fighting big, powerful, stupid monsters, which is an iconic D&D experience".
Orc	D&D Boxed Set (1974), D&D Basic Rules (1981, 1983), Rules Cyclopedia (1991)		Directly adapted from the orc in J.R.R. Tolkien's works. Considered one of the "five main "humanoid" races" in AD&D by Paul Karczag and Lawrence Schick. Presented as "evil" and "savage raiders" in the game.
Owl bear	D&D Supplement I: Greyhawk (1975), D&D Basic Rules (1981, 1983), Rules Cyclopedia (1991)		Newly created for the game early on inspired by a Hong Kong–made plastic toy, the owlbear was well-received as a useful and memorable monster.
Pegasi	D&D Boxed Set (1974), D&D Expert Rules (1981, 1983), Rules Cyclopedia (1991)		Taken from greek mythology, an example of the diverse cultures amalgamated into D&D.
Pixie	D&D Boxed Set (1974), D&D Basic Rules (1981, 1983), Rules Cyclopedia (1991)		The pixie appeared as a player character class in Tall Tales of the Wee Folk (1989).
Purple worm	D&D Boxed Set (1974), D&D Expert Rules (1981, 1983), Rules Cyclopedia (1991)		The "dread purple worm" attacks with both ends, maw and stinger. This "iconic monster" and original creation of Dungeons & Dragons is present all editions of the game.
Rust monster	D&D Supplement I: Greyhawk (1975), D&D Basic Rules (1981, 1983), Rules Cyclopedia (1991)		An original invention for the game and its artificial underground world, the appearance of the rust monster was inspired by a plastic toy from Hong Kong. It was ranked among the most memorable as well as obnoxious creatures in the game, terrifying to certain characters and their players not due to their ability to fight but to destroy their items. Chris Sims of the on-line magazine Comics Alliance referred to the rust monster as "the most feared D&D monster".
Shadow	D&D Supplement I: Greyhawk (1975), D&D Basic Rules (1981, 1983), Rules Cyclopedia (1991)		Rob Bricken of io9 identified the shadow as one of "The 12 Most Obnoxious Dungeons & Dragons Monsters".
Skeleton	D&D Boxed Set (1974), D&D Basic Rules (1981, 1983), Rules Cyclopedia (1991)		Skeleton of a deceased creature animated as an undead. The skeleton was ranked second among the ten best low-level monsters by the authors of Dungeons & Dragons For Dummies: "introduces players to the special advantages and weaknesses of undead monsters". They also thank Ray Harryhausen for people knowing what fighting skeletons ought to look like.
Spectre	D&D Boxed Set (1974), D&D Expert Rules (1981, 1983), Rules Cyclopedia (1991)		Inspired by Gothic fiction.
Stirge	D&D Supplement I: Greyhawk (1975), D&D Basic Rules (1981, 1983), Rules Cyclopedia (1991)		Flying and blood-sucking creature. "[P]esky" because while small they are dangerous to characters as a swarm. Present in the game since its earliest edition.
Troll	D&D Boxed Set (1974), D&D Expert Rules (1981, 1983), Rules Cyclopedia (1991)		A characteristic denizen of AD&D worlds. Their appearance and powerful regenerative ability is taken from Three Hearts and Three Lions by Poul Anderson rather than from their mythological or Tolkienesque counterparts. Considered one of the "five main "humanoid" races" in AD&D by Paul Karczag and Lawrence Schick.
Unicorn	D&D Boxed Set (1974), D&D Expert Rules (1981, 1983), Rules Cyclopedia (1991)		Based on the creature from medieval bestiaries. The Dungeons & Dragons animated series featured Uni the unicorn as a well-received "mascot" and "cute animal sidekick".
Vampire	D&D Boxed Set (1974), D&D Expert Rules (1981, 1983), Rules Cyclopedia (1991)		Depiction is related to those in 1930s and 1940s Hollywood Dracula movies, as well as folklore and Gothic fiction, and "classic" monster of the game.
Wight	D&D Boxed Set (1974), D&D Basic Rules (1981, 1983), Rules Cyclopedia (1991)		Thin humanoid undead. Directly adapted from the barrow-wight in Tolkien's The Lord of the Rings, while the concept is inspired Icelandic sagas. Rob Bricken of io9 identified the wight as one of "The 12 Most Obnoxious Dungeons & Dragons Monsters".
Wraith	D&D Boxed Set (1974), D&D Expert Rules (1981, 1983), Rules Cyclopedia (1991)		Inspired by and renamed from the Nazgul from J.R.R. Tolkien's legendarium, as well as by Gothic fiction.
Yellow Mold	D&D Boxed Set (1974), D&D Basic Rules (1981, 1983), Rules Cyclopedia (1991)		In the artificial dungeon environment of the game, molds function as a "clean up crew".
Zombie	D&D Boxed Set (1974), D&D Basic Rules (1981, 1983), Rules Cyclopedia (1991)		Based on the zombie from folklore as well as more contemporary entertainment.

== 1981 and 1983 revisions ==
=== TSR 2014 – Dungeons & Dragons – Basic Rulebook (1981) and TSR 1011B – Dungeons & Dragons – Basic Set (1983) ===
The second version of the D&D Basic Set, edited by Tom Moldvay, was first printed in 1981, and is generally known as the "red book". This revision solidified the split between the "Basic" and "Advanced" lines of the game. Few of the creature descriptions included illustrations, and most descriptions were limited to one paragraph.

A third edition of the Basic Rules was printed in 1983. This version split the rules into two books, the Player's Manual and the Dungeon Master's Rulebook, and was sold as a boxed set, with the product number TSR 1011B. Creature descriptions were provided in the Dungeon Master's Rulebook; with some minor changes to order and naming conventions and some removals, they duplicated the entries found in the 1981 edition. Once again the descriptions were generally limited to one paragraph, with few illustrations.

Creature	Other Appearances	Variants	Notes
Acolyte			Non-player character (NPC) variant. Present in the 1981 revision only.
Ape, White	Rules Cyclopedia (1991)		
Bandit	D&D Basic Rules (1977), Rules Cyclopedia (1991)		NPC variant.
Bat	Rules Cyclopedia (1991)	Normal and giant	
Bear	Rules Cyclopedia (1991)	Black, Grizzly, Polar and Cave	
Beetle, Giant	Rules Cyclopedia (1991)	Fire, Oil and Tiger	
Berserker	D&D Basic Rules (1977), Rules Cyclopedia (1991)		Human variant. Berserkers are based on the berserkir, "men of Odin, whom the god made strong like wild beasts", from Icelandic sagas and Snorri Sturluson's history of the kings of Norway.
Boar	Rules Cyclopedia (1991)		
Bugbear	D&D Basic Rules (1977, 1981, 1983), Rules Cyclopedia (1991)		
Carrion Crawler	D&D Basic Rules (1977), Rules Cyclopedia (1991)		
Cat, Great	Rules Cyclopedia (1991)	Mountain lion, Panther, Lion, Tiger and Sabre-tooth tiger	
Cave Locust	Rules Cyclopedia (1991) (as Giant Locust)		Renamed Giant Locust in the 1983 revision.
Centipede, Giant	Rules Cyclopedia (1991)		Giant centipedes are "low-level monsters", one-foot long red many-legged creatures.
Doppleganger	D&D Basic Rules (1977), Rules Cyclopedia (1991)		
Dragon	D&D Basic Rules (1977) (Red, White and Black), Rules Cyclopedia (1991)	White, Black, Red, Green, Blue and Gold dragon	
Driver Ant	Rules Cyclopedia (1991) (as Giant Ant)		Renamed Giant Ant in the 1983 version.
Dwarf	D&D Basic Rules (1977), Rules Cyclopedia (1991)		NPC variant.
Elf	D&D Basic Rules (1977), Rules Cyclopedia (1991)		NPC variant.
Ferret, Giant	Rules Cyclopedia (1991)		
Gargoyle	D&D Basic Rules (1977), Rules Cyclopedia (1991)		
Gelatinous Cube	D&D Basic Rules (1977), Rules Cyclopedia (1991)		
Ghoul	Rules Cyclopedia (1991)		Undead with "terrible claws". AD&D's ghouls were also adapted into the Magic: The Gathering trading card game, with a depiction taken from the Monster Manual being used in a prototype version.
Gnoll	Rules Cyclopedia (1991)		Richard W. Forest assumed them to be inspired from but not resembling the gnoles conceived by Lord Dunsany, while Gary Gygax himself stated that although Dunsany's "gnole" is close", he came up with the name as "a cross between a gnome and a troll", and the description was his original creation. He wanted to create a humanoid opponent in the game to fit in between the hobgoblin and bugbear in power. Gnolls were considered one of the "five main "humanoid" races" in AD&D by Paul Karczag and Lawrence Schick.
Gnome	D&D Basic Rules (1977), Rules Cyclopedia (1991)		
Goblin	D&D Basic Rules (1977), Rules Cyclopedia (1991)		
Gray Ooze	D&D Basic Rules (1977), Rules Cyclopedia (1991)		
Green Slime	D&D Basic Rules (1977), Rules Cyclopedia (1991)		
Halfling	Rules Cyclopedia (1991)		NPC variant.
Harpy	D&D Basic Rules (1977), Rules Cyclopedia (1991)		
Hobgoblin	D&D Basic Rules (1977), Rules Cyclopedia (1991)		
Insect Swarm	D&D Expert Rules (1983), Rules Cyclopedia (1991)		Moved to the D&D Expert Rules in the 1983 revision.
Killer Bee	Rules Cyclopedia (1991) (as Giant Bee)		Renamed Giant Bee in the 1983 revision.
Kobold	D&D Basic Rules (1977), Rules Cyclopedia (1991)		
Living Statue	Rules Cyclopedia (1991)	Crystal, Iron and Rock	
Lizard, Giant	Rules Cyclopedia (1991)	Gecko, Draco, Horned Chameleon and Tuatara	
Lizard Man	D&D Basic Rules (1977), Rules Cyclopedia (1991)		
Lycanthrope	D&D Basic Rules (1977), Rules Cyclopedia (1991)	Wererat, Werewolf, Wereboar, Weretiger and Werebear	
Medium			NPC variant. Present in the 1981 revision only.
Medusa	D&D Basic Rules (1977, 1981, 1983), D&D Companion Rules (1984), Rules Cyclopedia (1991)		
Minotaur	Rules Cyclopedia (1991)		Based on the creature from Greek mythology, but translated from a singular creature into a species. The minotaur was among the monsters featured as trading cards on the back of Amurol Products candy figure boxes. AD&D's minotaurs were also adapted into the Magic: The Gathering trading card game, with a depiction taken from the Monster Manual being used in a prototype version.
Mule	Rules Cyclopedia (1991)		
Neanderthal (Caveman)	Rules Cyclopedia (1991)		
Noble	D&D Expert Rules (1983) (as Men – Noble), Rules Cyclopedia (1991) (as Men – Noble)		Human variant. Moved to the D&D Expert Rules in the 1983 revision.
Normal Human	Rules Cyclopedia (1991)		Human variants.
NPC Party	D&D Basic Rules (1983)		NPC variants. Present only in the 1983 edition.
Ochre Jelly	D&D Basic Rules (1977), Rules Cyclopedia (1991)		
Ogre	D&D Basic Rules (1977), Rules Cyclopedia (1991)		
Orc	D&D Basic Rules (1977), Rules Cyclopedia (1991)		
Owl Bear	D&D Basic Rules (1977), Rules Cyclopedia (1991)		
Pixie	D&D Basic Rules (1977), Rules Cyclopedia (1991)		
Rat	Rules Cyclopedia (1991)	Normal and giant	Example of a monster posing little threat to the characters in the game, suitable for play at lowest level.
Robber Fly	Rules Cyclopedia (1991)		
Rock Baboon	Rules Cyclopedia (1991)		
Rust Monster	D&D Basic Rules (1977), Rules Cyclopedia (1991)		
Shadow	D&D Basic Rules (1977), Rules Cyclopedia (1991)		
Shrew, Giant	Rules Cyclopedia (1991)		
Shrieker	Rules Cyclopedia (1991)		Author Ben Woodard called D&D's fungi horrific in their variety, not only due to their poisonous nature but their creepy ability to move. Scott Baird from Screen Rant ranked the man-sized shrieker among the weakest monsters in the game, at "the bottom of the mushroom monster food chain": They "can be used as cheap alarm systems for Underdark societies, but they possess no combat abilities of their own. The only thing a shrieker can do is shriek".
Skeleton	D&D Basic Rules (1977), Rules Cyclopedia (1991)		
Snake	Rules Cyclopedia (1991)	Spitting Cobra, Pit Viper, Sea Snake, Giant Rattler and Rock Python (1981 and 1983); Giant Racer (1983)	The Giant Racer snake was present only in the 1983 edition.
Spider, Giant	Rules Cyclopedia (1991)	Crab spider, Black Widow and Tarantella	
Sprite	Rules Cyclopedia (1991)		
Stirge	D&D Basic Rules (1977), Rules Cyclopedia (1991)		
Thoul	Rules Cyclopedia (1991)		
Trader	D&D Expert Rules (1983) (as Men – Trader), Rules Cyclopedia (1991) (as Men – Trader)		NPC variant. Moved to the D&D Expert Rules in the 1983 revision.
Troglodyte	Rules Cyclopedia (1991)		Based on the stock character of the primitive caveman, Gary Gygax portrayed the troglodyte in the game as more monstrous, with chaotic and evil behaviour, offensive smell and lizard-like characteristics. The troglodyte was among the monsters featured as trading cards on the back of Amurol Products candy figure boxes.
Veteran			NPC variant. Present in the 1981 revision only.
Wight	D&D Basic Rules (1977), Rules Cyclopedia (1991)		
Wolf	Rules Cyclopedia (1991)	Normal and Dire	
Yellow Mold	D&D Basic Rules (1977), Rules Cyclopedia (1991)		
Zombie	D&D Basic Rules (1977), Rules Cyclopedia (1991)		

=== TSR 2015 – Dungeons & Dragons – Expert Rulebook (1981) and TSR 1012B – Dungeons & Dragons – Expert Set (1983) ===
The D&D Expert Rules were first printed in 1981, and are generally known as the "blue book". The new rules allowed for outdoor, wilderness-based adventures (over and above dungeon adventures), and for characters up to 14th level. Again, few of the creature descriptions included illustrations, and most descriptions were limited to one paragraph. (ISBN 0-935696-29-6).

A second edition of the Expert Rules was printed in 1983, and again was sold as a boxed set. With some minor changes to order and naming conventions and several removals, the creature descriptions duplicate the entries found in the 1981 edition. Once again the descriptions were generally limited to one paragraph, with few illustrations.

Creature	Other Appearances	Variants	Notes
Antelope (Herd Animals)	Rules Cyclopedia (1991)		
Basilisk	D&D Basic Rules (1977), D&D Companion Rules (1984), Rules Cyclopedia (1991)		
Black Pudding	D&D Basic Rules (1977), Rules Cyclopedia (1991)		
Blink Dog	D&D Basic Rules (1977), Rules Cyclopedia (1991)		
Caecilia	Rules Cyclopedia (1991)		
Camel	Rules Cyclopedia (1991)		
Centaur	Rules Cyclopedia (1991)		Based on the creature from Greek mythology.
Chimera	D&D Basic Rules (1977), Rules Cyclopedia (1991)		
Cockatrice	D&D Basic Rules (1977), D&D Companion Rules (1984), Rules Cyclopedia (1991)		
Crab, Giant	D&D Expert Module X13 Crown of Ancient Glory (1987), Rules Cyclopedia (1991)		
Crocodile	Rules Cyclopedia (1991)	Normal, large and giant	
Cyclops	Rules Cyclopedia (1991)		One-eyed giants based on Greek mythology.
Devil Swine	Rules Cyclopedia (1991) (as Lycanthrope – Devil Swine)		
Displacer Beast	D&D Basic Rules (1977), Rules Cyclopedia (1991)		
Djinni (Lesser)	D&D Basic Rules (1977), D&D Companion Rules (1984), Rules Cyclopedia (1991)		
Dragon Turtle	D&D Companion Rules (1984), D&D Expert Module X7 The War Rafts of Kron (1984), D&D Expert Module DA4 The Duchy of Ten (1987), Rules Cyclopedia (1991)		Present only in the 1981 edition. Present in the game since its inception.
Dryad	Rules Cyclopedia (1991)		Based on the dryad from classical sources.
Efreeti (Lesser)	D&D Companion Rules (1984), Rules Cyclopedia (1991)		A depiction of an "evil [...] efreet" already appeared in the original Dungeons & Dragons (1974) edition, another "enormous, devilish red" one was the main feature of the cover of the 1st edition Dungeon Master's Guide. Within the game's cosmology they were based on the Plane of Fire, centered around the "fabled City of Brass".
Elemental	D&D Companion Rules (1984), Rules Cyclopedia (1991)	Air, Earth, Fire and Water	Powerful creatures in the game; a characteristic of the air elemental is the ability of rapid movement.
Elephant	Rules Cyclopedia (1991) (as Elephant – Normal)	Normal and Prehistoric (1983 edition only).	The 1983 edition renamed Elephant to Elephant – Normal, and added the Prehistoric variant.
Fish, Giant	D&D Expert Module X6 Quagmire! (1984) (Giant Piranha, Giant Catfish), Creature Catalogue (1986) (Giant Piranha, Giant Catfish), Rules Cyclopedia (1991) (Giant Rockfish and Giant Sturgeon)	Giant Piranha, Giant Rockfish, Giant Catfish and Giant Sturgeon (1981); Giant Bass, Giant Rockfish and Giant Sturgeon (1983)	The 1983 edition removed the Giant Piranha and Giant Catfish variants, and added the Giant Bass.
Giant	D&D Basic Rules (1977), Rules Cyclopedia (1991)	Hill, Stone, Frost, Fire, Cloud and Storm	
Golem	D&D Basic Module B7 Rahasia (1984) (Bone Golem), D&D Basic Module B1-9 In Search of Adventure (1987) (Bone Golem), D&D Basic Module B12 Queen's Harvest (1989) (Wood Golem), Rules Cyclopedia (1991)	Wood, Bone, Amber and Bronze	The influence of Dungeons & Dragons has led to the inclusion of golems in other tabletop role-playing as well as in video games.
Gorgon	D&D Companion Rules (1984), Rules Cyclopedia (1991)		"iron plated bull", based on early modern bestiaries, with only the name being derived from the Classical counterpart.
Griffon	D&D Basic Rules (1977), Rules Cyclopedia (1991)		
Hawk	Creature Catalogue (1986)	Normal and giant	Included in the 1981 edition only.
Hellhound	D&D Basic Rules (1977), Rules Cyclopedia (1991)		
Hippogriff	D&D Basic Rules (1977), Rules Cyclopedia (1991)		
Horse	D&D Basic Rules (1977), Rules Cyclopedia (1991)	Riding, War and Draft	
Hydra	D&D Basic Rules (1977), Rules Cyclopedia (1991)		
Insect Swarm	D&D Basic Rules (1981), Rules Cyclopedia (1991)		Present only in the 1983 edition.
Invisible Stalker	D&D Companion Rules (1984), Rules Cyclopedia (1991)		
Leech, Giant	Rules Cyclopedia (1991)		
Manticore	D&D Basic Rules (1977), Rules Cyclopedia (1991)		Based on its mythological counterpart, the manticore appeared in the game from its earliest edition.
Mastodon			Present only in the 1981 edition.
Men	D&D Basic Rules (1981) (Trader and Noble), Rules Cyclopedia (1991) (excepting Merchant)	Brigand, Buccaneer (pirate), Dervish, Merchant and Nomad (1981, 1983); Trader and Noble (1983 edition)	Human variants.
Mermen	Rules Cyclopedia (1991)		
Mummy	D&D Basic Rules (1977), Rules Cyclopedia (1991)		
Nixies	D&D Basic Rules (1977), Rules Cyclopedia (1991)		
NPC Party	D&D Basic Rules (1981, 1983)	Adventurers, Cleric, Fighter and Wizard parties	NPC variants. Present only in the 1981 edition of the Expert Rules.
Octopus, Giant	D&D Expert Module X7 The War Rafts of Kron (1984), Creature Catalogue (1986)		Present only in the 1981 edition.
Pegasus	D&D Basic Rules (1977), Rules Cyclopedia (1991)		Part of the game from its very beginning, a pegasus was already depicted in the playtest material from 1973 for the original edition.
Pterodactyl	Rules Cyclopedia (1991) (as Pterosaur)	Pterodactyl and Pteranodon	
Purple Worm	D&D Basic Rules (1977), Rules Cyclopedia (1991)		
Rhinoceros	Creature Catalogue (1986)	Normal and Woolly	Present only in the 1981 edition.
Rhagodessa	Rules Cyclopedia (1991)		
Roc	Rules Cyclopedia (1991)	Small, large and giant	An enormous bird, based on a mythological creature probably of Persian origin, known from Sindbad the Sailor.
Salamander	D&D Companion Rules (1984), Rules Cyclopedia (1991)	Flame and Frost	
Scorpion, Giant	Rules Cyclopedia (1991)		Scorpions have the distinction of having been the very first combat encounter in the first playtest, run by Gary Gygax, of the original version of the game. Scorpion the size of a horse, its stinger carries a deadly poison.
Sea Dragons	Creature Catalogue (1986)		Present only in the 1981 edition.
Sea Serpent (Lesser)	D&D Expert Module X7 The War Rafts of Kron (1984), Creature Catalogue (1986)		Present only in the 1981 edition.
Shark	D&D Companion Rules (1984), D&D Expert Module X7 The War Rafts of Kron (1984), Rules Cyclopedia (1991)	Bull, Mako and Great White	Present only in the 1981 edition.
Spectre	D&D Basic Rules (1977), Rules Cyclopedia (1991)		
Squid, Giant	D&D Expert Module X7 The War Rafts of Kron (1984), Creature Catalogue (1986), D&D Expert Module X13 Crown of Ancient Glory (1987)		Present only in the 1981 edition.
Stegosaurus			Present only in the 1981 edition.
Termite, Water	Rules Cyclopedia (1991)	Swamp, Fresh and Salt Water Termite	
Titanothere	Creature Catalogue (1986) (as Dinosaur – Titanothere)		Present only in the 1981 edition.
Toad, Giant	Rules Cyclopedia (1991) (Giant)		
Treant	Rules Cyclopedia (1991)		Based on the Ent by J. R. R. Tolkien, and renamed due to copyright reasons.
Triceratops	Rules Cyclopedia (1991)		
Troll	D&D Basic Rules (1977), Rules Cyclopedia (1991)		
Tyrannosaurus Rex	Rules Cyclopedia (1991)		
Unicorn	D&D Basic Rules (1977), Rules Cyclopedia (1991)		
Vampire	D&D Basic Rules (1977), Rules Cyclopedia (1991)		
Weasel, Giant	Rules Cyclopedia (1991)		
Whale	D&D Companion Rules (1984), D&D Expert Module X7 The War Rafts of Kron (1984), D&D Expert Module X13 Crown of Ancient Glory (1987) (Sperm Whale), Rules Cyclopedia (1991) (Killer, Narwhal)	Killer Whale, Narwhal and Sperm Whale	Present only in the 1981 edition.
Wraith	D&D Basic Rules (1977), Rules Cyclopedia (1991)		
Wyvern	Rules Cyclopedia (1991)		Its tail is equipped with a poisonous tail stinger.

== 1983 Revision (Later Sets) ==
=== TSR 1013 – Dungeons & Dragons – Companion Rules, Dungeon Master's Companion (1984) ===
The Dungeon Master's Companion divides creatures into two groups: those from the Prime Plane and those from Other Planes. These are listed separately below. The creature descriptions generally did not include illustrations. Notably, the first list of creatures is not presented in alphabetical order. Neither the Companion Set nor its individual books (Player's and Dungeon Master's Companions) have an ISBN.

Creature (Prime Plane)	Other Appearances	Variants	Notes
Beholder	Rules Cyclopedia (1991)		A "creature that looks at you and is destroying you by the power of its magical eyes". A terrible beast, but depicted as "a cuddly rosy ball with too many eyes". Designed to counter magic-using characters while being a formidable opponent for a whole party due to its versatility. Considered one of "the game's signature monsters" by Philip J. Clements. A "classic", "iconic", as well as "one of the most feared and fearsome monsters of the game", present through all editions.
Blast Spore	Rules Cyclopedia (1991)		
Dolphin	D&D Expert Module X7 The War Rafts of Kron (1984), D&D Expert Module DA4 The Duchy of Ten (1987), Rules Cyclopedia (1991)		
Dragon	D&D Basic Rules (1977) (White, Black and Red), D&D Basic Rules (1981,1983), Rules Cyclopedia (1991)	Large and huge variants of the Red, Blue, Green, Black, White and Gold dragons	
Dragon Turtle	D&D Expert Rules (1981), D&D Expert Module X7 The War Rafts of Kron (1984), D&D Expert Module DA4 The Duchy of Ten (1987), Rules Cyclopedia (1991)		
Drolem	Rules Cyclopedia (1991)		
Gargantua	Rules Cyclopedia (1991)	Gargantuan Carrion Crawler, Gargoyle and Troll	Not to be confused with Creature Catalogue (1986) Gargantua (a giant fish)
Gremlin	D&D Expert Module X2 Castle Amber (1981), Rules Cyclopedia (1991)		
Haunt	Rules Cyclopedia (1991)	Banshee, Ghost and Poltergeist	Not to be confused with Haunt as referenced in D&D Basic Module B1-9 In Search of Adventure (1987)
Golem, Mud	D&D Expert Module X2 Castle Amber (1981), Rules Cyclopedia (1991)		
Golem, Obsidian	D&D Module MSolo2 Maze of the Riddling Minotaur (1983), Rules Cyclopedia (1991)		
Grab Grass	D&D Expert Module X2 Castle Amber (1981), Rules Cyclopedia (1991)		
Malfera	D&D Expert Module X5 Temple of Death (1983), Rules Cyclopedia (1991)		
Manscorpion	Rules Cyclopedia (1991)		
Manta Ray	D&D Expert Module X7 The War Rafts of Kron (1984), Rules Cyclopedia (1991)		
Mujina	D&D Expert Module X5 Temple of Death (1983), Rules Cyclopedia (1991)		
Phantom	Rules Cyclopedia (1991)	Apparition, Shade and Vision	
Toad, Rock or Cave	D&D Module MSolo1 Blizzard Pass (1983), Rules Cyclopedia (1991)		
Shark	D&D Expert Rules (1981), D&D Expert Module X7 The War Rafts of Kron (1984), Rules Cyclopedia (1991)	Bull, Mako and Great White sharks	
Snow Ape	D&D Module MSolo1 Blizzard Pass (1983), Rules Cyclopedia (1991)		
Spectral Hound	D&D Expert Module X5 Temple of Death (1983), Rules Cyclopedia (1991)		
Spirit	Rules Cyclopedia (1991)	Druj, Odic and Revenant	
Weasel, Giant	D&D Expert Rules (1981), Rules Cyclopedia (1991)		
Whale	D&D Expert Rules (1981), D&D Expert Module X7 The War Rafts of Kron (1984), D&D Expert Module X13 Crown of Ancient Glory (1987) (Sperm Whale), Rules Cyclopedia (1991) (Killer, Narwhal)	Killer whale, Sperm whale and Narwhal	

Creature (Other Planes)	Other Appearances	Variants	Notes
Aerial Servant	Rules Cyclopedia (1991)		
Basilisk	D&D Basic Rules (1977), D&D Expert Rules (1981,1983), Rules Cyclopedia (1991)		Describes additional abilities/penalties applicable to native plane of existence.
Cockatrice	D&D Basic Rules (1977), D&D Expert Rules (1981,1983), Rules Cyclopedia (1991)		Describes additional abilities/penalties applicable to native plane of existence.
Djinni, Lesser	D&D Basic Rules (1977), D&D Expert Rules (1981, 1983), Rules Cyclopedia (1991)		Describes additional abilities/penalties applicable to native plane of existence.
Djinni, Greater	Rules Cyclopedia (1991)		
Efreeti, Lesser	D&D Expert Rules (1981, 1983), Rules Cyclopedia (1991)		Describes additional abilities/penalties applicable to native plane of existence.
Efreeti, Greater	Rules Cyclopedia (1991)		
Elemental	D&D Expert Rules (1981, 1983), Rules Cyclopedia (1991)		Describes additional statistics and abilities/penalties applicable to native plane of existence.
Gorgon	D&D Expert Rules (1981, 1983), Rules Cyclopedia (1991)		Describes additional abilities/penalties applicable to native plane of existence.
Helion	Rules Cyclopedia (1991)		
Horde	Rules Cyclopedia (1991)		
Hydrax	Rules Cyclopedia (1991)		
Invisible Stalker	D&D Expert Rules (1981, 1983), Rules Cyclopedia (1991)		Describes additional abilities/penalties applicable to native plane of existence.
Kryst	Rules Cyclopedia (1991)		
Medusa	D&D Basic Rules (1977, 1981, 1983), Rules Cyclopedia (1991)		Describes additional abilities/penalties applicable to native plane of existence.
Plasm	Rules Cyclopedia (1991)	Normal and Giant	
Salamander	D&D Expert Rules (1981, 1983), Rules Cyclopedia (1991)		Describes additional abilities/penalties applicable to native plane of existence.
Undine	Rules Cyclopedia (1991)		

=== TSR 1021 – Dungeons & Dragons – Master Rules, Master DM's Book (1985) ===
The Master DM's Book divides creatures into two groups: again, those from the Prime Plane and those from Other Planes. These are listed separately below. Again, the creature descriptions generally did not include illustrations. Neither the Master Set nor its individual books (Master Player's and Master DM's Books) have an ISBN.

Creature (Prime Plane)	Other Appearances	Variants	Notes
Actaeon	Rules Cyclopedia (1991)		
Adaptor	Rules Cyclopedia (1991)		
Athach	Rules Cyclopedia (1991)		Later adapted as a player character race and class in Savage Species (2003)
Beholder, Undead			
Devilfish	Rules Cyclopedia (1991)		
Dinosaur, Aquatic	Rules Cyclopedia (1991)	Small, Large and Armoured	
Dinosaur, Land Carnivore	Rules Cyclopedia (1991)	Small, Large and Flying	
Dinosaur, Land Herbivore	Rules Cyclopedia (1991)	Small, Medium/Armoured and Large	
Dragon	Rules Cyclopedia (1991) (as Dragon, gemstone; excepting Brown)	Crystal, Onyx, Jade, Sapphire, Ruby and Brown	
Dragon Ruler	Rules Cyclopedia (1991)	Pearl, Opal, Diamond and The Great Dragon	
Drake	Rules Cyclopedia (1991)	Mandrake, Woodrake, Colddrake and Elemental	
Faerie	Rules Cyclopedia (1991)		
Giant	Rules Cyclopedia (1991)	Mountain and Sea	
Hag	Rules Cyclopedia (1991)	Black and Sea	Immortal wicked and ugly powerful females with magical abilities for deception. Based on the pervasive figure from folklore, with "different interpretations of the monster around the world" being worked into different variants in the game, allowing each "a little more personality". In the view of Stag and Trammel, hags in D&D represent misogynistic and ageist tendencies in their authors. SyFy Wire in 2018 called it one of "The 9 Scariest, Most Unforgettable Monsters From Dungeons & Dragons", saying that "There are endless horrific possibilities when it comes to hags."
Hsaio	Rules Cyclopedia (1991)		
Human	Rules Cyclopedia (1991)	Headsman, Thug and Mystic	Human variants.
Lich	Rules Cyclopedia (1991)		Emaciated undead spellcaster, a "classic" monster of the game.
Lycanthrope	Rules Cyclopedia (1991)	Werebat, Werefox and Wereseal	
Mek	Rules Cyclopedia (1991)		
Metamorph	Rules Cyclopedia (1991)		
Nekrozon	D&D Companion Module CM9 Legacy of Blood (1987), Rules Cyclopedia (1991)		
Nightshade	Rules Cyclopedia (1991)	Nightcrawler, Nightwalker and Nightwing	
Nuckalavee	Rules Cyclopedia (1991)		
Ooze, Lava	Rules Cyclopedia (1991)		
Revener	Rules Cyclopedia (1991)		
Sasquatch	Rules Cyclopedia (1991)		
Slug, Giant	Rules Cyclopedia (1991)		
Sphinx	Rules Cyclopedia (1991)		Based on Egyptian and Classical mythology, an example of the diverse cultures amalgamated into D&D.
Sporacle	Rules Cyclopedia (1991)		

Creature (Prime Plane)	Other Appearances	Variants	Notes
Archon	Rules Cyclopedia (1991)		
Blackball (Deadly Sphere)	D&D Immortals Rules (1986), Rules Cyclopedia (1991)		
Elemental Ruler	Rules Cyclopedia (1991)		
Phoenix	Rules Cyclopedia (1991)	Lesser and Greater	
Spider, Planar	Rules Cyclopedia (1991)		

=== TSR 1017 – Dungeons & Dragons – Immortals Rules (1986) ===
The Immortals DM's Book provides a single section containing new or previously published creatures, listed below. Again, most creature descriptions did not include illustrations. Neither the Immortals Set nor its individual books (Immortals Player's and Immortals DM's Books) have an ISBN.

Creature (Prime Plane)	Other Appearances	Variants	Notes
Baak			
Demon		Screaming demon, Croaking demon, Howling demon, Groaning demon, Hissing demon, Roaring demon, Whispering demon, Orcus, Demogorgon	Many were based on figures from Christian demonology. Considered among the "standard repertoire of "Monsters"" by Fabian Perlini-Pfister. Demogorgon was inspired by its real-world mythological counterpart. Orcus was likewise inspired by its real-world mythological counterpart.
Diabolus			
Draeden			Draedens are massive, ancient beings that predate the multiverse. A draeden's rarely seen true appearance is a cluster of about forty tubular strands, all symmetrically attached at a central node. Each strand has a mouth at its end, and opens upon a digestive passage that leads to the central node. The node is spherical and ridged, resembling a human brain, and is the creature's equivalent of a stomach. It contains several boulders to aid digestion. A draeden's nervous system spans its entire body. The creatures's total length varies from 19 to 38 miles, tip to tip. The central node usually comprises one-tenth of the creature's total diameter. Draeden usually appear to other creatures as the most deadly thing imaginable to those creatures. The 92nd layer of the Abyss, known as Ulgurshek, is actually a draeden who lay dormant while the Abyss formed around it.
Elemaster			
Flicker			
Immortals			
Jumper			
Megalith			
Nipper			
Notion			
Protean			
Repeater (or Ditto)			
Soo			
Titan			Based on the powerful beings from Greek mythology. Ranked among the strongest creatures in the game by Scott Baird from Screen Rant, as they "stand above giants and possess even more power in terms of their physical and magical capabilities". Backstab reviewer Michaël Croitoriu thought them truly interesting for powergamers when made available as player characters.
Tonal		Breve, Semibreve, Minim, Crotchet, Quaver, Semiquaver	
Vortex creatures	D&D Master Rules (1985), Rules Cyclopedia (1991)	Blackball	

== B Series Modules ==
=== TSR 9044 – D&D Basic Module B3 Palace of the Silver Princess (1981) ===
The Palace of the Silver Princess was the only D&D module ever published by TSR to be recalled immediately after distribution, ostensibly for editorial issues and questionable artwork. Two versions of the module exist: the extremely rare orange-cover original printing (available for download as a PDF from Wizards of the Coast), and the more common green-cover revised edition. The original version added 13 new creatures; two of these survived in the revised edition, but the majority were removed. The original version of the module was issued as ISBN 0-935696-31-8. The updated green-cover version of the module contained only three new creatures, and was issued with the same ISBN.

Creature	Other Appearances	Variants	Notes
Archer Bushes	Creature Catalogue (1986), D&D Basic Module B1-9 In Search of Adventure (1987)		Retained in revised edition.
Baric			Removed from revised edition.
Bubbles			Removed from revised edition.
Decapus	Creature Catalogue (1986), D&D Basic Module B1-9 In Search of Adventure (1987)		Retained in revised edition.
Diger			Removed from revised edition.
Ghost			Removed from revised edition.
Giant Marble Snake			Removed from revised edition.
Jupiter Bloodsucker			Removed from revised edition.
Monkey, Giant Marmoset			Removed from revised edition.
Poltergeist			Removed from revised edition.
Protectors			Removed from revised edition.
Purple Moss			Removed from revised edition.
Ubue			Removed from revised edition.
Vampire Rose	D&D Expert Module X2 Castle Amber (1981), Creature Catalogue (1986), D&D Basic Module B1-9 In Search of Adventure (1987)		Present in revised edition only.

=== TSR 9049 – D&D Basic Module B4 The Lost City (1982) ===
The Lost City module, published in 1982, added four new creatures, with limited illustrations and short descriptions.

ISBN 0-935696-55-5

Creature	Other Appearances	Variants	Notes
Banshee	Creature Catalogue (1986), D&D Basic Module B1-9 In Search of Adventure (1987) (as Wailing Fey)		Inspired by Gothic fiction.
Cynidicean	Creature Catalogue (1986), D&D Basic Module B1-9 In Search of Adventure (1987)		Human variant.
Lycanthrope, Werefox	D&D Basic Module B1-9 In Search of Adventure (1987)		
Polymar	Creature Catalogue (1986), D&D Basic Module B1-9 In Search of Adventure (1987)		

=== TSR 9078 – D&D Basic Module B5 Horror on the Hill (1983) ===
Horror on the Hill, published in 1983, added three new creatures. The descriptions included illustrations of all three new monsters.

ISBN 0-88038-046-2

Creature	Other Appearances	Variants	Notes
Piranha Bird	D&D Expert Module X6 Quagmire! (1984), Creature Catalogue (1986), D&D Basic Module B1-9 In Search of Adventure (1987)		
Steam Weevil	Creature Catalogue (1986), D&D Basic Module B1-9 In Search of Adventure (1987)		
Lava Lizard	Creature Catalogue (1986), D&D Basic Module B1-9 In Search of Adventure (1987), D&D Expert Module DA4 The Duchy of Ten (1987)		

=== TSR 9078 – D&D Basic Module B6 The Veiled Society (1984) ===
The Veiled Society module, published in 1984, added a single new creature, with illustration.

ISBN 0-88038-085-3

Creature	Other Appearances	Variants	Notes
Sirenflower	Creature Catalogue (1986), D&D Basic Module B1-9 In Search of Adventure (1987)		

=== TSR 9115 – D&D Basic Module B7 Rahasia (1984) ===
Rahasia, published in 1984, added three new or previously published creatures, listed below.

ISBN 0-88038-113-2

Creature	Other Appearances	Variants	Notes
Haunt	D&D Basic Module B1-9 In Search of Adventure (1987)		Not to be confused with Haunt as referenced in D&D Companion Set (1984)
Water Weird	D&D Basic Module B8 Journey to the Rock (1984), Creature Catalogue (1986), D&D Basic Module B1-9 In Search of Adventure (1987)		An "old personal favorite" of reviewer Mark Theurer.
Bone Golem	D&D Expert Rules (1981, 1983), D&D Basic Module B1-9 In Search of Adventure (1987), Rules Cyclopedia (1991)		

=== TSR 9106 – D&D Basic Module B8 Journey to the Rock (1984) ===
Journey to the Rock, published in 1984, added seven new or previously published creatures.

ISBN 0-88038-158-2

Creature	Other Appearances	Variants	Notes
Chameleon Man	D&D Basic Module B1-9 In Search of Adventure (1987), Creature Catalogue (1986)		
Winged Warrior	Creature Catalogue (1986)		
Rock Man	Creature Catalogue (1986)		
Sand Spider			
Water Weird	D&D Basic Module B7 Rahasia (1984), Creature Catalogue (1986), D&D Basic Module B1-9 In Search of Adventure (1987)		
Ghostly Horde	Creature Catalogue (1986)		
Crone of Chaos	D&D Basic Module B1-9 In Search of Adventure (1987), Creature Catalogue (1986)		

=== TSR 9149 – D&D Basic Module B10 Night's Dark Terror (1986) ===
Night's Dark Terror, published in 1986, was billed as a special Basic/Expert transition module from the United Kingdom. It incorporated nine new or previously published creatures, with illustrations.

ISBN 0-88038-269-4

Creature	Other Appearances	Variants	Notes
Chevall	Creature Catalogue (1986)	Horse and Centaur forms	
Ice Wolf	Creature Catalogue (1986)		
Kartoeba			
Living Statue	Creature Catalogue (1986)	Silver, Rock/Ooze, Jade, Steel	
Rock Rattler	Creature Catalogue (1986)		
Lizard, Giant Foot-pad	Creature Catalogue (1986)		
Wyrd	Creature Catalogue (1986)		
Piranha (Cold-water)	Creature Catalogue (1986)		
Shroud Spider			

=== TSR 9190 – D&D Basic Module B1-9 In Search of Adventure (1987) ===
In Search of Adventure, published in 1987, was an abridged 160-page compilation module containing the majority of elements from modules B1 through B9. "New" monsters, previously published in modules B1 through B9 or in the D&D Expert Rules, were included in the compilation.

ISBN 0-88038-388-7

Creature	Other Appearances	Variants	Notes
Archer Bush	D&D Basic Module B3 Palace of the Silver Princess (1981), Creature Catalogue (1986)		
Chameleon Man	D&D Basic Module B8 Journey to the Rock (1984), Creature Catalogue (1986)		
Crone of Chaos	D&D Basic Module B8 Journey to the Rock (1984), Creature Catalogue (1986)		
Cynidicean	D&D Basic Module B4 The Lost City (1982), Creature Catalogue (1986)		
Decapus	D&D Basic Module B3 Palace of the Silver Princess (1981), Creature Catalogue (1986)		
Fey, Wailing	D&D Basic Module B4 The Lost City (1982) (as Banshee)		
Bone Golem	D&D Expert Rules (1981,1983), D&D Basic Module B7 Rahasia (1984)		
Haunt	D&D Basic Module B7 Rahasia (1984)		Not to be confused with Haunt as referenced in D&D Companion Rules (1984)
Lava Lizard	D&D Basic Module B5 Horror on the Hill (1983), Creature Catalogue (1986), D&D Expert Module DA4 The Duchy of Ten (1987)		
Lycanthrope, Werefox	D&D Basic Module B4 The Lost City (1982), Creature Catalogue (1986)		
Piranha Bird	D&D Basic Module B5 Horror on the Hill (1983), D&D Expert Module X6 Quagmire! (1984), Creature Catalogue (1986)		
Polymar	D&D Basic Module B4 The Lost City (1982), Creature Catalogue (1986)		
Sirenflower	D&D Basic Module B6 The Veiled Society (1984), Creature Catalogue (1986)		
Steam Weevil	D&D Basic Module B5 Horror on the Hill (1983), Creature Catalogue (1986)		
Vampire Roses	D&D Basic Module B3 Palace of the Silver Princess (1981), D&D Expert Module X2 Castle Amber (1981) , Creature Catalogue (1986)		
Water Weird	D&D Basic Module B7 Rahasia (1984), D&D Basic Module B8 Journey to the Rock (1984), Creature Catalogue (1986)		

=== TSR 9260 – D&D Basic Module B11 King's Festival (1989) ===
King's Festival, published in 1989, was billed as an introductory module specifically designed for inexperienced and new players. It incorporated two previously published creatures.

ISBN 0-88038-746-7

Creature	Other Appearances	Variants	Notes
Red Worm	D&D Expert Module XS2 Thunderdelve Mountain (1985), Creature Catalogue (1986)		
Giant Hunting Spider	D&D Module MSolo2 Maze of the Riddling Minotaur (1983), D&D Expert Module X6 Quagmire! (1984), Creature Catalogue (1986)		

=== TSR 9261 – D&D Basic Module B12 Queen's Harvest (1989) ===
Queen's Harvest, published in 1989, was billed as an introductory module specifically designed for inexperienced and new players. It incorporated three new or previously published creatures.

ISBN 0-88038-768-8

Creature	Other Appearances	Variants	Notes
Wood Golem	D&D Expert Rules (1981,1983), Rules Cyclopedia (1991)		
Caldron Magen	D&D Expert Module X2 Castle Amber (1981), Creature Catalogue (1986)		
Phase Stinger			

== X Series Modules ==
=== TSR 9043 – D&D Expert Module X1 The Isle of Dread (1981, 1983) ===
The Isle of Dread was the first module published for use with the D&D Expert Rules, in 1981. It included a New Monsters section containing 15 previously unpublished creatures. This module was included in the Expert Rules boxed set. It was reprinted in 1983, and issued in the boxed set with the 1983 version of the Expert Rules. The 1983 version included all the creatures from the original 1981 edition, and added one more. The creatures from both versions are listed in the table below.

ISBN 0-935696-30-X. (1981 edition)

ISBN 0-88038-053-5. (1983 edition)

Creature	Other Appearances	Variants	Notes
Allosaurus	Creature Catalogue (1986)		
Ankylosaurus	Creature Catalogue (1986)		
Aranea	D&D Expert Module X2 Castle Amber (1981), Creature Catalogue (1986), D&D Master's Module M5 Talons of Night (1987)		
Brontosaurus	Creature Catalogue (1986)		
Dimetrodon	Creature Catalogue (1986)		
Elk, Giant	Creature Catalogue (1986)		
Grangeri	Creature Catalogue (1986)		
Kopru	Creature Catalogue (1986), and Dragon #354 (April 2007), which also featured the amphibious kopru.		Later added as a player character class in The Sea People (1990). Converted to 2nd edition AD&D in the Mystara Monstrous Compendium Appendix (1994), and 3rd edition AD&D in the Monster Manual II (2002).
Megatherium	Creature Catalogue (1986)		
Native	Creature Catalogue (1986)		NPC variant.
Oyster, Giant	Creature Catalogue (1986)		Present in the 1983 edition only.
Phanaton	Creature Catalogue (1986), D&D Master's Module M5 Talons of Night (1987)		
Phororhacos ("Sword Beak")	Creature Catalogue (1986)		
Plesiosaurus	Rules Cyclopedia (1991)		
Rakasta	D&D Expert Module X2 Castle Amber (1981), Creature Catalogue (1986)		
Trachodon			

=== TSR 9051 – D&D Expert Module X2 Castle Amber (1981) ===
Castle Amber was the second module published for use with the D&D Expert Rules, in 1981. It contained a New Monsters section, adding 17 new monsters either previously unseen or published in D&D Expert Module X1. ISBN 0-935696-51-2.

Creature	Other Appearances	Variants	Notes
Amber Lotus Flowers	D&D Expert Module X9 The Savage Coast (1985), Creature Catalogue (1986)		
Amoeba, Giant	D&D Expert Module X9 The Savage Coast (1985), Creature Catalogue (1986)		
Aranea	D&D Expert Module X1 Isle of Dread (1981, 1983), Creature Catalogue (1986), D&D Master's Module M5 Talons of Night (1987)		
Brain Collector	Creature Catalogue (1986)		
Death Demon	Creature Catalogue (1986)		
Golem, Mud	D&D Companion Rules (1984)		
Grab Grass	D&D Companion Rules (1984), D&D Expert Module X6 Quagmire! (1984), Rules Cyclopedia (1991)		
Gremlin	D&D Companion Rules (1984)		
Killer Trees	D&D Expert Module X6 Quagmire! (1984), Creature Catalogue (1986)		
Lupin	D&D Expert Module X9 The Savage Coast (1985), Creature Catalogue (1986)		
Magen	Creature Catalogue (1986), D&D Basic Module B12 Queen's Harvest (1989) (Caldron)	Hypnos, Demos, Caldron and Galvan magen	
Pagan	D&D Expert Module X9 The Savage Coast (1985)		NPC variant.
Phantoms			
Rakasta	D&D Expert Module X1 Isle of Dread (1981, 1983), Creature Catalogue (1986)		
Slime Worm	Creature Catalogue (1986)		
Sun Brother	Creature Catalogue (1986), D&D Expert Module DA4 The Duchy of Ten (1987) (as Sollux)		
Vampire Roses	D&D Basic Module B3 Palace of the Silver Princess (1981), Creature Catalogue (1986), D&D Basic Module B1-9 In Search of Adventure (1987)		

=== TSR 9056 – D&D Expert Module X3 Curse of Xanathon (1982) ===
Curse of Xanathon, published in 1982, added a single new creature.

ISBN 0-935696-56-3

Creature	Other Appearances	Variants	Notes
Hypnosnake	Creature Catalogue (1986)		

=== TSR 9056 – D&D Expert Module X4 Master of the Desert Nomads (1983) ===
The first of a two-part series, Master of the Desert Nomads, was published in 1983 and included a New Monsters section, containing five new creature descriptions with illustrations.

ISBN 0-88038-016-0

Creature	Other Appearances	Variants	Notes
Bhut	Creature Catalogue (1986)		
Juggernaut	D&D Expert Module X10 Red Arrow, Black Shield (1985), Creature Catalogue (1986)	Wood and Stone	
Nagpa	Creature Catalogue (1986)		
Soul Eater	Creature Catalogue (1986), D&D Expert Module DA4 The Duchy of Ten (1987)		
Tabi	D&D Expert Module X10 Red Arrow, Black Shield (1985), Creature Catalogue (1986)		

=== TSR 9069 – D&D Expert Module X5 Temple of Death (1983) ===
The conclusion to the series started with module X4, Temple of Death was published in 1983 and included a New Monsters section, containing five previously unpublished creatures, with illustrations.

ISBN 0-88038-017-9

Creature	Other Appearances	Variants	Notes
Dusanu	Creature Catalogue (1986)		
Geonid	Creature Catalogue (1986)		
Malfera	D&D Companion Rules (1984), Rules Cyclopedia (1991)		
Mujina	D&D Companion Rules (1984), Rules Cyclopedia (1991)		
Spectral Hound	D&D Companion Rules (1984), Rules Cyclopedia (1991)		

=== TSR 9081 – D&D Expert Module X6 Quagmire! (1984) ===
Quagmire!, published in 1984, added six new or previously published creatures.

ISBN 0-88038-112-4

Creature	Other Appearances	Variants	Notes
Fish, Giant	D&D Expert Rules (1981), Creature Catalogue (1986)	Giant Piranha and Giant Catfish	
Grab Grass	D&D Expert Module X2 Castle Amber (1981), D&D Companion Rules (1984), Rules Cyclopedia (1991)		
Killer Trees	D&D Expert Module X2 Castle Amber (1981), Creature Catalogue (1986)		
Piranha Bird	D&D Basic Module B5 Horror on the Hill (1983), Creature Catalogue (1986), D&D Basic Module B1-9 In Search of Adventure (1987)		
Pocket Dragon	D&D Module MSolo2 Maze of the Riddling Minotaur (1983), Creature Catalogue (1986)		
Spider, Giant Hunting	D&D Module MSolo2 Maze of the Riddling Minotaur (1983), Creature Catalogue (1986), D&D Basic Module B11 King's Festival (1989)		

=== TSR 9079 – D&D Expert Module X7 The War Rafts of Kron (1984) ===
The War Rafts of Kron was published in 1984 and included a New Monsters section, containing 14 new or previously published creatures.

ISBN 0-88038-114-0

Creature	Other Appearances	Variants	Notes
Dolphin	D&D Companion Rules (1984), D&D Expert Module DA4 The Duchy of Ten (1987), Rules Cyclopedia (1991)		
Dragon Turtle	D&D Expert Rules (1981), D&D Companion Rules (1984), D&D Expert Module DA4 The Duchy of Ten (1987), Rules Cyclopedia (1991)		
Eel	Creature Catalogue (1986)	Electric and Giant	
Gargantua	Creature Catalogue (1986)		A giant fish; not to be confused with D&D Companion Rules (1984) Gargantua
Sea Horse	Creature Catalogue (1986)		
Giant Jellyfish	Creature Catalogue (1986)	Marauder and Man-o-War	
Manta Ray	D&D Companion Rules (1984) (normal), Rules Cyclopedia (1991)	Normal and giant	
Giant Octopus	D&D Expert Rules (1981), Creature Catalogue (1986)		
Sea Serpent	D&D Expert Rules (1981) (Lesser), Creature Catalogue (1986)	Lesser and greater	
Shark	D&D Expert Rules (1981), D&D Companion Rules (1984), Rules Cyclopedia (1991)	Bull, Mako and Great White	
Squid, Giant	D&D Expert Rules (1981), Creature Catalogue (1986), D&D Expert Module X13 Crown of Ancient Glory (1987)		
Triton	Creature Catalogue (1986)		An aquatic race based on the merman in Greek mythology.
Velya	Creature Catalogue (1986)		
Whale	D&D Expert Rules (1981), D&D Companion Rules (1984), D&D Expert Module X13 Crown of Ancient Glory (1987) (Sperm Whale), Rules Cyclopedia (1991) (Killer, Narwhal)	Killer, Narwhal and Sperm	

=== TSR 9127 – D&D Expert Module X8 Drums on Fire Mountain (1984) ===
Drums on Fire Mountain was published in 1984 and included a New Monsters section, containing five previously unpublished creatures.

ISBN 0-88038-181-7

Creature	Other Appearances	Variants	Notes
Kara-Kara	Creature Catalogue (1986)		
Fundamental	Creature Catalogue (1986)	Earth, Air, Water, Fire	
Topi	Creature Catalogue (1986)		
Kal-Muru (Ship-bane)	Creature Catalogue (1986)		
Agarat	Creature Catalogue (1986)		

=== TSR 9129 – D&D Expert Module X9 The Savage Coast (1985) ===
The Savage Coast was published in 1985 and included a New Monsters section, containing 13 new or previously published creatures, with illustrations.

ISBN 0-88038-197-3

Creature	Other Appearances	Variants	Notes
Amber Lotus Flower	D&D Expert Module X2 Castle Amber (1981), Creature Catalogue (1986)		
Amoeba, Giant	D&D Expert Module X2 Castle Amber (1981), Creature Catalogue (1986)		
Cay-man	Creature Catalogue (1986)		
Decapus	Creature Catalogue (1986)	Marine	
Dog	Creature Catalogue (1986)	Normal	
Dragonne	D&D Expert Module XL1 Quest for the Heartstone (1984), Creature Catalogue (1986)		
Giant River Serpentweed	Creature Catalogue (1986) (as Giant Serpentweed)		
Lupin	D&D Expert Module X2 Castle Amber (1981), Creature Catalogue (1986)		
Pagan	D&D Expert Module X2 Castle Amber (1981)		Human variant.
Sacrol	D&D Module MSolo2 Maze of the Riddling Minotaur (1983), Creature Catalogue (1986)		
Tortle	Creature Catalogue (1986)		
Snapper	Creature Catalogue (1986)		
Strangle Vine	Creature Catalogue (1986)		

=== TSR 9160 – D&D Expert Module X10 Red Arrow, Black Shield (1985) ===
Red Arrow, Black Shield was published in 1985 and included a New Monsters section, containing two previously published creatures with illustrations.

ISBN 0-88038-245-7

Creature	Other Appearances	Variants	Notes
Juggernaut	D&D Expert Module X4 Master of the Desert Nomads (1983), Creature Catalogue (1986)	Wood and Stone	
Tabi	D&D Expert Module X4 Master of the Desert Nomads (1983), Creature Catalogue (1986)		

=== TSR 9165 – D&D Expert Module X11 Saga of the Shadow Lord (1986) ===
Saga of the Shadow Lord was published in 1986 and included a New Monsters section, containing three previously unpublished creatures.

ISBN 0-88038-311-9

Creature	Other Appearances	Variants	Notes
Skeletal Beast			Unique.
Undead Chimera			Unique.
Wraith Lord			Unique.

=== TSR 9188 – D&D Expert Module X12 Skarda's Mirror (1987) ===
Skarda's Mirror was published in 1987 and included a single previously unpublished creature.

ISBN 0-88038-385-2

Creature	Other Appearances	Variants	Notes
Mirror Fiend			Unique.

=== TSR 9218 – D&D Expert Module X13 Crown of Ancient Glory (1987) ===
Crown of Ancient Glory was published in 1986 and included a New Monsters section, containing five new or previously published creatures.

ISBN 978-0-88038-495-7

Creature	Other Appearances	Variants	Notes
Lochnar			Unique.
Maramet (Undead King)			Unique.
Crab, Giant	D&D Expert Rules (1981,1983), Rules Cyclopedia (1991)		
Squid, Giant	D&D Expert Rules (1981), D&D Expert Module X7 The War Rafts of Kron (1984), Creature Catalogue (1986)		
Whale, Sperm	D&D Expert Rules (1981), D&D Companion Rules (1984), D&D Expert Module X7 The War Rafts of Kron (1984)		

=== TSR 9114 – D&D Expert Module XL1 Quest for the Heartstone (1984) ===
Quest for the Heartstone was published in 1984 and included a New Monsters section, containing four previously unpublished creatures, with illustrations.

ISBN 0-88038-311-9

Creature	Other Appearances	Variants	Notes
Dragonne	D&D Expert Module X9 The Savage Coast (1985), Creature Catalogue (1986)		
Roper	Creature Catalogue (1986), D&D Expert Module DA3 City of the Gods (1987), D&D Expert Module DA4 The Duchy of Ten (1987)		A dangerous inhabitant of the Underdark with "murderous behavior". One of the original creations for the game, Witwer et al. rated them among the "iconic D&D monsters".
Hook Horror	Creature Catalogue (1986), D&D Expert Module DA3 City of the Gods (1987) (both under Hook Beast)		
Dragonfly	Creature Catalogue (1986)	White, Black, Green, Blue and Red	

=== TSR 9157 – D&D Expert Module XS2 Thunderdelve Mountain (1985) ===
Thunderdelve Mountain was a solo adventure published in 1985; it included a New Monsters section, containing three previously unpublished creatures.

ISBN 0-88038-242-2

Creature	Other Appearances	Variants	Notes
Red Worm	Creature Catalogue (1986), D&D Basic Module B11 King's Festival (1989)		
Fyrsnaca	Creature Catalogue (1986)		
Vapour Ghoul	Creature Catalogue (1986)		

== DA Series Modules ==
=== TSR 9191 – D&D Expert Module DA3 City of the Gods (1987) ===
City of the Gods, published in 1987, was a D&D Expert rules module set in the Blackmoor campaign world. It included 13 new or previously published creatures, with short descriptions and few illustrations.

ISBN 0-88038-389-5

Creature	Other Appearances	Variants	Notes
Camarilla			
Cyborg			
Gakarak	Creature Catalogue (1986), D&D Expert Module DA4 The Duchy of Ten (1987)		
Garl	D&D Companion Module CM6 Where Chaos Reigns (1985), Creature Catalogue (1986)		
Geonid	Creature Catalogue (1986)		
Grazer	D&D Expert Module DA4 The Duchy of Ten (1987)		
Herex	Creature Catalogue (1986)	Larval and Adult	
Hide Hunter	D&D Expert Module DA4 The Duchy of Ten (1987)		Human variant.
Hook Beast	D&D Expert Module XL1 Quest for the Heartstone (1984) (Hook Horror), Creature Catalogue (1986)	Hook Horror and Hulker	
Robot		DBOT, SBOT, EBOT and UBOT	
Quarg			
Roper	D&D Expert Module XL1 Quest for the Heartstone (1984), Creature Catalogue (1986), D&D Expert Module DA4 The Duchy of Ten (1987)		
Sand Folk			

=== TSR 9205 – D&D Expert Module DA4 The Duchy of Ten (1987) ===
The Duchy of Ten, published in 1987, was a D&D Expert rules module set in the Blackmoor campaign world. It included 14 new or previously published creatures, with short descriptions and some illustrations.

ISBN 0-88038-412-3

Creature	Other Appearances	Variants	Notes
Brother of the Greenwood			Human variant.
Dolphin	D&D Companion Rules (1984), D&D Expert Module X7 The War Rafts of Kron (1984), Rules Cyclopedia (1991)		
Dragon Turtle	D&D Expert Rules (1981), D&D Companion Rules (1984), D&D Expert Module X7 The War Rafts of Kron (1984), Rules Cyclopedia (1991)		
Gakarak	Creature Catalogue (1986), D&D Expert Module DA3 City of the Gods (1987)		
Gator Man	Creature Catalogue (1986)		
Grazer	D&D Expert Module DA3 City of the Gods (1987)		
Handmaiden of Death			Human variant.
Hide Hunter	D&D Expert Module DA3 City of the Gods (1987)		Human variant.
Lava Lizard	D&D Basic Module B5 Horror on the Hill (1983), Creature Catalogue (1986), D&D Basic Module B1-9 In Search of Adventure (1987)		
Roper	D&D Expert Module XL1 Quest for the Heartstone (1984) (Hook Horror), Creature Catalogue (1986), D&D Expert Module DA3 City of the Gods (1987)		
Sister of Fire			Human variant.
Skandaharian Raider			Human variant.
Sollux (Sun Brother)	D&D Expert Module X2 Castle Amber (1981) (as Sun Brother), Creature Catalogue (1986)		
Soul Eater	D&D Expert Module X4 Master of the Desert Nomads (1983), Creature Catalogue (1986)		

== MSolo Series Modules ==
=== TSR 9067 – D&D Module MSolo1 Blizzard Pass (1983) ===
Blizzard Pass was a Basic Set solo D&D module published in 1983 which included a New Monsters section containing two previously unpublished creatures with illustrations.

ISBN 0-88038-004-7

Creature	Other Appearances	Variants	Notes
Toad, Rock or Cave	D&D Companion Rules (1984), Rules Cyclopedia (1991)		
Snow Ape	D&D Companion Rules (1984), Rules Cyclopedia (1991)		

=== TSR 9060 – D&D Module MSolo2 Maze of the Riddling Minotaur (1983) ===
Maze of the Riddling Minotaur was an Expert Set solo D&D module published in 1983 which included a New Monsters section on the interior cover, containing 5 previously unpublished creatures with illustrations.

ISBN 0935696-73-3

Creature	Other Appearances	Variants	Notes
Golem, Obsidian	D&D Companion Rules (1984), Rules Cyclopedia (1991)		
Sacrol	D&D Expert Module X9 The Savage Coast (1985), Creature Catalogue (1986)		
Zombie Minotaur			
Spider, Giant Hunting	D&D Expert Module X6 Quagmire! (1984), Creature Catalogue (1986), D&D Basic Module B11 King's Festival (1989)		
Pocket Dragon	D&D Expert Module X6 Quagmire! (1984), Creature Catalogue (1986)		

== O Series Modules ==
=== TSR 9157 – D&D Expert Module O2 Blade of Vengeance (1985) ===
Blade of Vengeance was a one-on-one adventure published in 1984; it included a New Monsters section containing four previously unpublished creatures.

ISBN 0-88038-190-6

Creature	Other Appearances	Variants	Notes
Shargugh	Creature Catalogue (1986)		
Flitterling	Creature Catalogue (1986)		
Faedorne	Creature Catalogue (1986)		
Silver Warrior	Creature Catalogue (1986)		

== CM Series Modules ==
=== TSR 9118 – D&D Companion Module CM2 Death's Ride (1984) ===
Death's Ride was published in 1984 and included a New Monsters section containing one previously unpublished creature with illustration.

ISBN 0-88038-117-5

Creature	Other Appearances	Variants	Notes
Death Leech	Creature Catalogue (1986)		

=== TSR 9119 – D&D Companion Module CM3 Sabre River (1984) ===
Sabre River was published in 1984 and included a New Monsters section containing one previously unpublished creature.

ISBN 0-88038-118-3

Creature	Other Appearances	Variants	Notes
Sabreclaw	Creature Catalogue (1986)		

=== TSR 9154 – D&D Companion Module CM5 Mystery of the Snow Pearls (1985) ===
Mystery of the Snow Pearls was published in 1985 and included a New Monsters section containing two previously unpublished creatures with illustrations.

ISBN 0-88038-239-2

Creature	Other Appearances	Variants	Notes
Ash Crawler	Creature Catalogue (1986)		
Gyerian	Creature Catalogue (1986)		

=== TSR 9158 – D&D Companion Module CM6 Where Chaos Reigns (1985) ===
Where Chaos Reigns was published in 1985 and included a New Monsters section on a removable sheet, containing three previously unpublished creatures with illustrations.

ISBN 0-88038-243-0

Creature	Other Appearances	Variants	Notes
Oard	Creature Catalogue (1986)		
Garl (Caveman)	Creature Catalogue (1986), D&D Expert Module DA3 City of the Gods (1987)		
Hephaeston	Creature Catalogue (1986)		

=== TSR 9192 – D&D Companion Module CM8 The Endless Stair (1987) ===
The Endless Stair was published in 1987 and included a New Monsters section, containing four previously unpublished creatures with illustrations.

ISBN 0-88038-390-9

Creature	Other Appearances	Variants	Notes
Prying Eyes			Unique.
Guardian Hand			Unique.
Skullwraith			Unique.
Eater-of-Magic			Unique.

=== TSR 9210 – D&D Companion Module CM9 Legacy of Blood (1987) ===
Legacy of Blood was published in 1987 and included a New Monsters section containing five previously unpublished creatures with illustrations.

ISBN 0-88038-487-5

Creature	Other Appearances	Variants	Notes
Giant Swamp Eel			
Giant Freshwater Slug			
Swamp Velya			
Giant Swamp Snapping Turtle			
Nekrozon	D&D Master Rules (1985), Rules Cyclopedia (1991)		

== M Series Modules ==
=== TSR 9159 – D&D Master's Module M1 Into the Maelstrom (1985) ===
Into the Maelstrom was published in 1985 and included a New Monsters section containing one previously unpublished creature.

ISBN 0-88038-244-9

Creature	Other Appearances	Variants	Notes
Roaring Demon			Unique.

=== TSR 9148 – D&D Master's Module M2 Vengeance of Alphaks (1986) ===
Vengeance of Alphaks was published in 1986 and included a New Monsters section containing two previously unpublished creatures.

ISBN 0-88038-271-6

Creature	Other Appearances	Variants	Notes
Beetle, Earthquake	Creature Catalogue (1986)		
Pegataur	Creature Catalogue (1986)		

=== TSR 9214 – D&D Master's Module M5 Talons of Night (1987) ===
Talons of Night was published in 1987 and included a New Monsters section containing five new or previously published creatures with illustrations.

ISBN 0-88038-491-3

Creature	Other Appearances	Variants	Notes
Aketheti			Unique.
Aranea	D&D Expert Module X1 The Isle of Dread (1981, 1983), D&D Expert Module X2 Castle Amber (1981), Creature Catalogue (1986)		
Dusker			
Night Spider			Unique.
Phanaton	D&D Expert Module X1 The Isle of Dread (1981, 1983), Creature Catalogue (1986)		

== Later Publications ==
=== TSR 9173 – AC9 – Creature Catalogue (1986) ===
Creature Catalogue was the first full book of monsters for the basic edition of the Dungeons & Dragons game, published in 1986 after the Basic, Expert, Companion, and Master sets. The book collected all the creatures first presented in the official Dungeons & Dragons adventure modules to that time, plus many new creatures. It incorporated a comprehensive index of all D&D monsters found in the book and in the Basic, Expert, Companion and Master rule sets. The monsters are divided into six sections, arranged by creature type: Animals, Conjurations, Humanoids, Lowlifes, Monsters and Undead.

ISBN 0-88038-315-1

Creature (Animal)	Other Appearances	Variants	Notes
Cat, great		Bekkah, Cheetah, Jaguar, Lynx, Spotted Lion and Wildcat	
Dinosaur	D&D Expert Rules (1981) (Titanothere), D&D Expert Module X1 Isle of Dread (1981, 1983) (Allosaurus, Ankylosaurus, Brontosaurus)	Allosaurus, Ankylosaurus, Brontosaurus, Titanothere and Tylosaurus	
Dog	D&D Expert Module X9 The Savage Coast (1985) (Normal)	Normal and War	
Eagle		Normal and great	
Eel	D&D Expert Module X7 The War Rafts of Kron (1984) (Electric, Giant)	Electric, Giant and Weed	
Elk, giant	D&D Expert Module X1 Isle of Dread (1981, 1983)		
Fish, giant	D&D Expert Rules (1981), D&D Expert Module X6 Quagmire! (1984)	Giant Catfish and Giant Piranha	
Frog, giant poisonous			
Gargantua	D&D Expert Module X7 The War Rafts of Kron (1984)		
Hawk	D&D Expert Rules (1981)	Normal and giant	
Lizard, giant foot-pad	D&D Basic Module B10 Night's Dark Terror (1986)		
Magpie		Normal and giant	
Megatherium	D&D Expert Module X1 Isle of Dread (1981, 1983)		
Octopus, giant	D&D Expert Rules (1981), D&D Expert Module X7 The War Rafts of Kron (1984)		
Owl, giant			
Oyster, giant	D&D Expert Module X1 Isle of Dread (1983 only)		
Piranha (cold-water)	D&D Basic Module B10 Night's Dark Terror (1986)		
Porcupine, giant			
Raven & crow		Normal and large Raven and Crow	
Rhinoceros	D&D Expert Rules (1981)	Normal and Wooly	
Shark, Vamora			
Skunk		Normal and giant	
Snake	D&D Basic Module B10 Night's Dark Terror (1986)	Normal and giant Rock Rattler	
Squid, giant	D&D Expert Rules (1981), D&D Expert Module X7 The War Rafts of Kron (1984), D&D Expert Module X13 Crown of Ancient Glory (1987)		

Creature (Conjuration)	Other Appearances	Variants	Notes
Desert ghost			
Faedorne	D&D Expert One-on-one Module O2 Blade of Vengeance (1984)		
Fundamental	D&D Expert Module X8 Drums on Fire Mountain (1984)	Air, Earth, Fire and Water	
Gargoyle, iron			
Golem		Rock and Silver	
Guardian warrior & horse			
Homunculus		Ulzaq, Gretch and Fylgar	
Huptzeen			
Juggernaut	D&D Expert Module X4 Master of the Desert Nomads (1983), D&D Expert Module X10 Red Arrow, Black Shield (1985)	Stone and Wood	
Kal-muru (ship bane)	D&D Expert Module X8 Drums on Fire Mountain (1984)		
Living statue	D&D Basic Module B10 Night's Dark Terror (1986)	Silver, Rock/Ooze, Jade and Steel	
Magen	D&D Expert Module X2 Castle Amber (1981), D&D Basic Module B12 Queen's Harvest (1989) (Caldron)	Hypnos, Demos, Caldron and Galvan	
Nightmare			
Reflecter			
Silver warrior	D&D Expert One-on-one Module O2 Blade of Vengeance (1984)		
Soul eater	D&D Expert Module X4 Master of the Desert Nomads (1983), D&D Expert Module DA4 The Duchy of Ten (1987)		
Winged warrior	D&D Basic Module B8 Journey to the Rock (1984)		

Creature (Humanoid)	Other Appearances	Variants	Notes
Bhut	D&D Expert Module X4 Master of the Desert Nomads (1983)		
Cay-man	D&D Expert Module X9 The Savage Coast (1985)		
Chameleon man	D&D Basic Module B8 Journey to the Rock (1984), D&D Basic Module B1-9 In Search of Adventure (1987)		
Crone of chaos	D&D Basic Module B8 Journey to the Rock (1984), D&D Basic Module B1-9 In Search of Adventure (1987)		
Cryion			
Dark wing			
Elf, aquatic			
Flitterling	D&D Expert One-on-one Module O2 Blade of Vengeance (1984)		
Garl	D&D Companion Module CM6 Where Chaos Reigns (1985), D&D Expert Module DA3 City of the Gods (1987)		
Gator man	D&D Expert Module DA4 The Duchy of Ten (1987)		
Hephaeston	D&D Companion Module CM6 Where Chaos Reigns (1985)		
Hutaakan		Priest, Warrior and Other	
Kara-kara	D&D Expert Module X8 Drums on Fire Mountain (1984)		
Kna			
Lupin	D&D Expert Module X2 Castle Amber (1981), D&D Expert Module X9 The Savage Coast (1985)		
Man, isolated	D&D Basic Module B4 The Lost City (1982) (Cynidicean), D&D Basic Module B1-9 In Search of Adventure (Cynidicean) (1987)	Cynidiceans, Quariks and Traldar (Warrior, Vocal and Other)	
Man, primitive	D&D Expert Module X1 Isle of Dread (1981, 1983) (Native)	Native, Wild Man and Barbarian	
Oard	D&D Companion Module CM6 Where Chaos Reigns (1985)		
Pachydermion			
Phanaton	D&D Expert Module X1 Isle of Dread (1981, 1983), D&D Master's Module M5 Talons of Night (1987)		
Rakasta	D&D Expert Module X1 Isle of Dread (1981, 1983), D&D Expert Module X2 Castle Amber (1981)		
Rock man	D&D Basic Module B8 Journey to the Rock (1984)		
Shark-kin			
Shargugh	D&D Expert One-on-one Module O2 Blade of Vengeance (1984)		
Sis'thik (desert scourge)			
Snapper	D&D Expert Module X9 The Savage Coast (1985)		
Sollux (sun brother)	D&D Expert Module X2 Castle Amber (1981), D&D Expert Module DA4 The Duchy of Ten (1987)		
Stalwart			
Tortle	D&D Expert Module X9 The Savage Coast (1985)		
Triton	D&D Expert Module X7 The War Rafts of Kron (1984)		
Wood imp			

Creature (Lowlife)	Other Appearances	Variants	Notes
Amber lotus flower	D&D Expert Module X2 Castle Amber (1981), D&D Expert Module X9 The Savage Coast (1985)		
Amoeba, giant	D&D Expert Module X2 Castle Amber (1981), D&D Expert Module X9 The Savage Coast (1985)		
Archer bush	D&D Basic Module B3 Palace of the Silver Princess (1981)		
Fyrsnaca	D&D Expert Module XS2 Thunderdelve Mountain (1985)		
Herex		Larval and Adult	
Jellyfish, giant	D&D Expert Module X7 The War Rafts of Kron (1984)	Marauder and Man-O-War	
Killer tree	D&D Expert Module X2 Castle Amber (1981), D&D Expert Module X6 Quagmire! (1984)		
Leviathan		Desert and Marine	
Masher			
Red worm	D&D Expert Module XS2 Thunderdelve Mountain (1985), D&D Basic Module B11 King's Festival (1989)		
Scorpion			
Serpentweed, giant	D&D Expert Module X9 The Savage Coast (1985) (as Giant River Serpentweed)		
Sirenflower	D&D Basic Module B6 The Veiled Society (1984)		
Slime worm	D&D Expert Module X2 Castle Amber (1981)		
Spider, giant	D&D Module MSolo2 Maze of the Riddling Minotaur (1983) (Giant Hunting Spider), D&D Expert Module X6 Quagmire! (1984) (Giant Hunting Spider), D&D Basic Module B11 King's Festival (1989) (Giant Hunting Spider)	Giant Hunting, Giant Sand, Giant Shroud and Huge Wood Spider	
Steam weevil	D&D Basic Module B5 Horror on the Hill (1983)		
Strangle vine	D&D Expert Module X9 The Savage Coast (1985)		
Strangleweed			
Vampire rose	D&D Basic Module B3 Palace of the Silver Princess (1981) (revised edition), D&D Expert Module X2 Castle Amber (1981), D&D Basic Module B1-9 In Search of Adventure (1987)		
Whipweed			

Creature (Monster)	Other Appearances	Variants	Notes
Aranea	D&D Expert Module X1 Isle of Dread (1981, 1983), D&D Expert Module X2 Castle Amber (1981), D&D Master's Module M5 Talons of Night (1987)		
Ash crawler	D&D Companion Module CM5 Mystery of the Snow Pearls (1985)		
Baldandar			
Banshee, lesser	D&D Basic Module B4 The Lost City (1982), D&D Basic Module B1-9 In Search of Adventure (1987) (as Wailing Fey)		
Bargda			
Beetle, earthquake	D&D Master's Module M2 Vengeance of Alphaks (1986)		
Beholder, aquatic			
Brain collector	D&D Expert Module X2 Castle Amber (1981)		
Chevall	D&D Basic Module B10 Night's Dark Terror (1986)		
Death demon	D&D Expert Module X2 Castle Amber (1981)		
Decapus (land and marine)	D&D Basic Module B3 Palace of the Silver Princess (1981) (land), D&D Expert Module X9 The Savage Coast (1985) (marine), D&D Basic Module B1-9 In Search of Adventure (1987) (land)		
Dragon, sea	D&D Expert Rules (1981)		
Dragonfly	D&D Expert Module XL1 Quest for the Heartstone (1984)	White, Black, Green, Blue and Red Dragonfly	
Dragonne	D&D Expert Module XL1 Quest for the Heartstone (1984), D&D Expert Module X9 The Savage Coast (1985)		
Dusanu	D&D Expert Module X5 Temple of Death (1983)		
Fungoid			
Gakarak	D&D Expert Module DA3 City of the Gods (1987), D&D Expert Module DA4 The Duchy of Ten (1987)		
Geonid	D&D Expert Module X5 Temple of Death (1983)		
Ghostly horde	D&D Basic Module B8 Journey to the Rock (1984)		
Grangeri	D&D Expert Module X1 Isle of Dread (1981, 1983)		
Gyerian	D&D Companion Module CM5 Mystery of the Snow Pearls (1985)		
The Hivebrood		Broodling, Hivebrood, Hiveleader, Broodmother, and Hivemind	
Hook beast	D&D Expert Module XL1 Quest for the Heartstone (1984) (Hook Horror), D&D Expert Module DA3 City of the Gods (1987)	Hook Horror and Hulker	
Hypnosnake	D&D Expert Module X3 Curse of Xanathon (1982)		
Ice wolf	D&D Basic Module B10 Night's Dark Terror (1986)		
Kopru	D&D Expert Module X1 Isle of Dread (1981, 1983)		
Kraken			
Lamara			
Lava lizard	D&D Basic Module B5 Horror on the Hill (1983), D&D Basic Module B1-9 In Search of Adventure (1987), D&D Expert Module DA4 The Duchy of Ten (1987)		
Leveller (bodendruker)			
Nagpa	D&D Expert Module X4 Master of the Desert Nomads (1983)		
Pegataur	D&D Master's Module M2 Vengeance of Alphaks (1986)		
Phantom, lesser			
Phororhacos ("sword beak")	D&D Expert Module X1 Isle of Dread (1981, 1983)		
Piranha bird (lesser and greater)	D&D Basic Module B5 Horror on the Hill (1983) (lesser), D&D Expert Module X6 Quagmire! (1984) (lesser), D&D Basic Module B1-9 In Search of Adventure (1987) (lesser)		
Pocket dragon	D&D Module MSolo2 Maze of the Riddling Minotaur (1983), D&D Expert Module X6 Quagmire! (1984)		
Polymar	D&D Basic Module B4 The Lost City (1982), D&D Basic Module B1-9 In Search of Adventure (1987)		
Randara			
Roper	D&D Expert Module XL1 Quest for the Heartstone (1984), D&D Expert Module DA3 City of the Gods (1987), D&D Expert Module DA4 The Duchy of Ten (1987)		
Sabreclaw	D&D Companion Module CM3 Sabre River (1984)		
Scamille			
Sea horse	D&D Expert Module X7 The War Rafts of Kron (1984)		
Sea serpent	D&D Expert Rules (1981), D&D Expert Module X7 The War Rafts of Kron (1984)		
Surtaki			
Tabi	D&D Expert Module X4 Master of the Desert Nomads (1983), D&D Expert Module X10 Red Arrow, Black Shield (1985)		
Thunderhead			
Water weird	D&D Basic Module B8 Journey to the Rock (1984), D&D Basic Module B7 Rahasia (1984), D&D Basic Module B1-9 In Search of Adventure (1987)		
White-fang			
Wychglow			
Xytar			
Yowler			

Creature (Undead)	Other Appearances	Variants	Notes
Agarat	D&D Expert Module X8 Drums on Fire Mountain (1984)		
Dark-hood (rorphyr)			
Death leech	D&D Companion Module CM2 Death's Ride (1984)		
Dragon, undead			
Elder ghoul			
Grey philosopher		Grey Philosopher and Malice	
Haunt, lesser			
Mesmer			
Phygorax			
Possession			
Sacrol	D&D Module MSolo2 Maze of the Riddling Minotaur (1983), D&D Expert Module X9 The Savage Coast (1985)		
Topi	D&D Expert Module X8 Drums on Fire Mountain (1984)		
Vapour ghoul	D&D Expert Module XS2 Thunderdelve Mountain (1985)		
Velya	D&D Expert Module X7 The War Rafts of Kron (1984)		
Wyrd	D&D Basic Module B10 Night's Dark Terror (1986)	Normal and greater	

=== TSR 1071 – Rules Cyclopedia (1991) ===
The Dungeons & Dragons Rules Cyclopedia was published in 1991. It was intended as an encyclopedia of all the major rules for the basic Dungeons & Dragons game up to that point, including most of the information appearing in the previous boxed sets. Chapter 14 of the book presented most of the monsters used in the basic D&D game once again.

ISBN 1-56076-085-0

Creature	Other Appearances	Variants	Notes
Actaeon (elk centaur)	D&D Master Rules (1985)		
Adaptor	D&D Master Rules (1985)		
Aerial servant (haoou)	D&D Companion Rules (1984)		
Animal herd	D&D Expert Rules (1981, 1983)		
Ant, giant	D&D Basic Rules (1981, 1983) (as Driver Ant in 1981 edition)		
Ape, snow	D&D Module MSolo1 Blizzard Pass (1983), D&D Companion Rules (1984)		
Ape, white	D&D Basic Rules (1981, 1983)		
Archon	D&D Master Rules (1985)		
Athach	D&D Master Rules (1985)		
Baboon, rock	D&D Basic Rules (1981, 1983)		
Bandit	D&D Basic Rules (1977, 1981, 1983)		NPC Variant.
Basilisk	D&D Basic Rules (1977), D&D Expert Rules (1981, 1983), D&D Companion Rules (1984)		
Bat	D&D Basic Rules (1981, 1983)	Normal and giant	
Bear	D&D Basic Rules (1981, 1983)	Black, Grizzly, Polar and Cave	
Bee, giant	D&D Basic Rules (1981, 1983) (as Killer Bee in 1981 edition)		
Beetle, giant	D&D Basic Rules (1981, 1983)	Fire, Oil and Tiger	
Beholder	D&D Companion Rules (1984)		
Berserker	D&D Basic Rules (1977, 1981, 1983)		Human variant.
Black pudding	D&D Basic Rules (1977), D&D Expert Rules (1981, 1983)		
Blackball (deadly sphere)	D&D Master Rules (1985), D&D Immortals Rules (1986)		
Blast spore	D&D Companion Rules (1984)		
Blink dog	D&D Basic Rules (1977), D&D Expert Rules (1981, 1983)		
Boar	D&D Basic Rules (1981, 1983)	Normal and giant	
Bugbear	D&D Basic Rules (1977, 1981, 1983)		
Caecilia	D&D Expert Rules (1981, 1983)		
Camel	D&D Expert Rules (1981, 1983)		
Carrion crawler	D&D Basic Rules (1977, 1981, 1983)		
Cat, great	D&D Basic Rules (1981, 1983)	Mountain lion, Panther, Lion, Tiger and Sabre-tooth Tiger	
Centaur	D&D Expert Rules (1981, 1983)		
Centipede, giant	D&D Basic Rules (1981, 1983)		
Chimera	D&D Basic Rules (1977), D&D Expert Rules (1981, 1983)		
Cockatrice	D&D Basic Rules (1977), D&D Expert Rules (1981, 1983), D&D Companion Rules (1984)		
Crocodile	D&D Expert Rules (1981, 1983)	Normal, large and giant	
Crab, giant	D&D Expert Rules (1981, 1983), D&D Expert Module X13 Crown of Ancient Glory (1987)		
Cyclops	D&D Expert Rules (1981, 1983)		
Devilfish	D&D Master Rules (1985)		
Dinosaur, aquatic	D&D Master Rules (1985)	Small, large and armoured	Considered among the "standard repertoire of "Monsters"", and among the 12 most underrated monsters, "a creature as large and fearsome as a dragon but without all the hype".
Dinosaur, land carnivore	D&D Master Rules (1985)	Small, large and flying	
Dinosaur, land herbivore	D&D Master Rules (1985)	Small, medium and large	
Displacer beast	D&D Basic Rules (1977), D&D Expert Rules (1981, 1983)		
Djinni (lesser)	D&D Basic Rules (1977), D&D Expert Rules (1981, 1983), D&D Companion Rules (1984)		
Djinni (greater; pasha)	D&D Companion Rules (1984)		
Dolphin	D&D Companion Rules (1984), D&D Expert Module X7 The War Rafts of Kron (1984), D&D Expert Module DA4 The Duchy of Ten (1987)		
Doppleganger	D&D Basic Rules (1977, 1981, 1983)		
Dragon	D&D Basic Rules (1977) (Red, White and Black), D&D Basic Rules (1981, 1983) (small), D&D Companion Rules (1984) (large and huge)	White, Blue, Black, Red, Green and Gold, in small, large and huge varieties	
Dragon, gemstone	D&D Master Rules (1985) (excluding Amber)	Crystal, Onyx, Jade, Sapphire, Ruby and Amber	
Dragon ruler	D&D Master Rules (1985)	Pearl (the Moon Dragon), Ruler of all Chaotic Dragons; Diamond (the Star Dragon), Ruler of all Lawful Dragons; Opal (the Sun Dragon), Ruler of all Neutral Dragons; and the Great One, Ruler of All Dragonkind	
Dragon turtle	D&D Expert Rules (1981), D&D Companion Rules (1984), D&D Expert Module X7 The War Rafts of Kron (1984), D&D Expert Module DA4 The Duchy of Ten (1987)		
Drake	D&D Master Rules (1985)	Mandrake, Wooddrake, Colddrake and Elemental Drake	
Drolem	D&D Companion Rules (1984)		
Dryad	D&D Expert Rules (1981, 1983)		
Dwarf	D&D Basic Rules (1977, 1981, 1983)		
Efreeti, lesser	D&D Expert Rules (1981, 1983), D&D Companion Rules (1984)		
Efreeti (greater; amir)	D&D Companion Rules (1984)		
Elemental	D&D Expert Rules (1981, 1983), D&D Companion Rules (1984)	Air, Earth, Water and Fire	
Elemental ruler	D&D Master Rules (1985)		
Elephant	D&D Expert Rules (1981, 1983)	Normal and prehistoric	
Elf	D&D Basic Rules (1977, 1981, 1983)		
Faerie	D&D Master Rules (1985)		
Ferret, giant	D&D Basic Rules (1981, 1983)		
Fish, giant	D&D Expert Rules (1981, 1983) (Giant Rockfish and Giant Sturgeon)	Giant Bass, Giant Rockfish and Giant Sturgeon	
Gargantua	D&D Companion Rules (1984)	Gargantuan Carrion Crawler, Gargoyle and Troll	Not to be confused with Creature Catalogue (1986) Gargantua (a giant fish)
Gargoyle	D&D Basic Rules (1977, 1981, 1983)		
Gelatinous cube	D&D Basic Rules (1977, 1981, 1983)		
Ghoul	D&D Basic Rules (1981, 1983)		
Giant	D&D Basic Rules (1977) (Hill, Stone, Frost, Fire, Cloud and Storm), D&D Expert Rules (1981, 1983) (Hill, Stone, Frost, Fire, Cloud and Storm), D&D Master Rules (1985) (Mountain and Sea)	Hill, Stone, Frost, Fire, Cloud, Storm, Mountain and Sea	
Gnoll	D&D Basic Rules (1981, 1983)		
Gnome	D&D Basic Rules (1977, 1981, 1983)		
Goblin	D&D Basic Rules (1977, 1981, 1983)		
Golem	D&D Expert Rules (1981) (Wood, Bone, Amber, Bronze), D&D Expert Module X2 Castle Amber (1981) (Mud), D&D Expert Rules (1983) (Wood, Bone, Amber, Bronze), D&D Module MSolo2 Maze of the Riddling Minotaur (1983) (Obsidian), D&D Companion Rules (1984) (Mud, Obsidian), D&D Basic Module B12 Queen's Harvest (1989) (Wood Golem)	Wood, Bone, Obsidian, Mud, Amber and Bronze	
Gorgon	D&D Expert Rules (1981, 1983), D&D Companion Rules (1984)		
Grab grass	D&D Expert Module X2 Castle Amber (1981), D&D Companion Rules (1984), D&D Expert Module X6 Quagmire! (1984)		
Gray ooze	D&D Basic Rules (1977, 1981, 1983)		
Green slime	D&D Basic Rules (1977, 1981, 1983)		
Gremlin	D&D Expert Module X2 Castle Amber (1981), D&D Companion Rules (1984)		
Griffon	D&D Basic Rules (1977), D&D Expert Rules (1981, 1983)		Originally based on the creature from Persian mythology.
Hag	D&D Master Rules (1985)	Black and Sea	
Halfling	D&D Basic Rules (1981, 1983)		
Harpy	D&D Basic Rules (1977, 1981, 1983)		
Haunt	D&D Companion Rules (1984)	Banshee, Ghost and Poltergeist	
Headsman (and thug)	D&D Master Rules (1985) (as Human: Headsman and Thug)		Human variant.
Helion	D&D Companion Rules (1984)		
Hellhound	D&D Basic Rules (1977), D&D Expert Rules (1981, 1983)		
Hippogriff	D&D Basic Rules (1977), D&D Expert Rules (1981, 1983)		
Hobgoblin	D&D Basic Rules (1977, 1981, 1983)		
Horde	D&D Companion Rules (1984)		
Horse	D&D Basic Rules (1977), D&D Expert Rules (1981, 1983) (Riding, War and Draft Horse)	Riding, War, and Draft Horses, and Pony	
Hsiao (guardian owl)	D&D Master Rules (1985)		
Hydra	D&D Basic Rules (1977), D&D Expert Rules (1981, 1983)		
Hydrax	D&D Companion Rules (1984)		
Insect swarm	D&D Basic Rules (1981), D&D Expert Rules (1983)		
Invisible stalker (sshai)	D&D Expert Rules (1981, 1983), D&D Companion Rules (1984)		
Kobold	D&D Basic Rules (1977, 1981, 1983)		
Kryst	D&D Companion Rules (1984)		
Lava ooze	D&D Master Rules (1985)		
Leech, giant	D&D Expert Rules (1981, 1983)		
Lich	D&D Master Rules (1985)		
Lizard, giant	D&D Basic Rules (1981, 1983)	Gecko, Draco, Horned Chameleon and Tuatara	
Lizard man	D&D Basic Rules (1977, 1981, 1983)		
Locust, giant	D&D Basic Rules (1981) (as Cave Locust), D&D Basic Rules (1983)		
Lycanthrope	D&D Basic Rules (1977, 1981, 1983) (Wererat, Werewolf, Wereboar, Weretiger, Werebear), D&D Expert Rules (1981, 1983) (Devil Swine), D&D Master Rules (1985) (Werebat, Werefox and Wereseal)	Wererat, Werewolf, Wereboar, Weretiger, Werebear, Werebat, Werefox, Wereshark, Wereseal and Devil Swine	
Malfera	D&D Expert Module X5 Temple of Death (1983), D&D Companion Rules (1984)		
Manscorpion	D&D Companion Rules (1984)		
Manta ray	D&D Companion Rules (1984) (Normal), D&D Expert Module X7 The War Rafts of Kron (1984)	Normal and giant	
Manticore	D&D Expert Rules (1981, 1983)		
Medusa	D&D Basic Rules (1977, 1981, 1983), D&D Companion Rules (1984)		
Mek	D&D Master Rules (1985)		
Men	D&D Basic Rules (1981) (Trader, Noble), D&D Expert Rules (1981) (Brigand, Buccaneer/Pirate, Dervish and Nomad), D&D Expert Rules (1983)	Brigand, Buccaneer/Pirate, Dervish, Noble, Nomad and Trader	Human variant
Merman	D&D Expert Rules (1981, 1983)		
Metamorph	D&D Master Rules (1985)		
Minotaur	D&D Basic Rules (1981, 1983)		
Mujina	D&D Expert Module X5 Temple of Death (1983), D&D Companion Rules (1984)		
Mule	D&D Basic Rules (1981, 1983)		
Mummy	D&D Basic Rules (1977), D&D Expert Rules (1981, 1983)		
Mystic	D&D Master Rules (1985) (as Human: Mystic)		Human variant.
Neanderthal (caveman)	D&D Basic Rules (1981, 1983)		
Nekrozon	D&D Master Rules (1985), D&D Companion Module CM9 Legacy of Blood (1987)		
Nightshade	D&D Master Rules (1985)	Nightcrawler, Nightwalker and Nightwing	
Nixie	D&D Basic Rules (1977), D&D Expert Rules (1981, 1983)		
Normal human	D&D Basic Rules (1981, 1983)		
Nuckalavee	D&D Master Rules (1985)		
Ochre jelly	D&D Basic Rules (1977, 1981, 1983)		
Ogre	D&D Basic Rules (1977, 1981, 1983)		
Orc	D&D Basic Rules (1977, 1981, 1983)		
Owl bear	D&D Basic Rules (1977, 1981, 1983)		
Pegasus	D&D Basic Rules (1977), D&D Expert Rules (1981, 1983)		
Phantom	D&D Companion Rules (1984)	Apparition, Shade and Vision	
Phoenix	D&D Master Rules (1985)	Lesser and greater	
Pixie	D&D Basic Rules (1977, 1981, 1983)		
Plasm	D&D Companion Rules (1984)	Normal and giant	
Plesiosaurus	D&D Expert Module X1 Isle of Dread (1981, 1983)		
Pterosaur	D&D Expert Rules (1981, 1983) (Pterodactyl and Pteranodon)	Small (Pterodactyl), medium (Pteranodon) and large	
Purple worm	D&D Basic Rules (1977), D&D Expert Rules (1981, 1983)		
Rat	D&D Basic Rules (1981, 1983)	Normal and giant	
Revener	D&D Master Rules (1985)		
Rhagodessa	D&D Expert Rules (1981, 1983)		
Robber fly	D&D Basic Rules (1981, 1983)		
Roc	D&D Expert Rules (1981, 1983)	Small, large and giant	
Rust monster	D&D Basic Rules (1977, 1981, 1983)		
Salamander	D&D Expert Rules (1981, 1983), D&D Companion Rules (1984)	Flame and Frost	
Sasquatch	D&D Master Rules (1985)		
Scorpion, giant	D&D Expert Rules (1981, 1983)		
Shadow	D&D Basic Rules (1977, 1981, 1983)		
Shark	D&D Expert Rules (1981), D&D Companion Rules (1984), D&D Expert Module X7 The War Rafts of Kron (1984)	Bull, Mako and Great White	
Shrew, giant	D&D Basic Rules (1981, 1983)		
Shrieker	D&D Basic Rules (1981, 1983)		
Skeleton	D&D Basic Rules (1977, 1981, 1983)		
Slug, giant	D&D Master Rules (1985)		
Snake	D&D Basic Rules (1981) (excepting Giant Racer), D&D Basic Rules (1983)	Spitting Cobra, Giant Racer, Pit Viper, Sea Snake, Giant Rattler and Rock Python	
Spectral hound	D&D Expert Module X5 Temple of Death (1983), D&D Companion Rules (1984)		
Spectre	D&D Basic Rules (1977), D&D Expert Rules (1981, 1983)		
Sphinx	D&D Master Rules (1985)		
Spider, giant	D&D Basic Rules (1981, 1983)	Crab Spider, Black Widow and Tarantella	
Spider, planar	D&D Master Rules (1985)		
Spirit	D&D Companion Rules (1984)	Druj, Odic and Revenant	
Sporacle	D&D Master Rules (1985)		
Sprite	D&D Basic Rules (1981, 1983)		
Statue, living	D&D Basic Rules (1981, 1983)	Crystal, Iron and Rock	
Stirge	D&D Basic Rules (1977, 1981, 1983)		
Termite, water	D&D Expert Rules (1981, 1983)	Swamp, Fresh and Salt Water Termite	
Thoul	D&D Basic Rules (1981, 1983)		
Toad	D&D Module MSolo1 Blizzard Pass (1983) (Rock or Cave), D&D Companion Rules (1984) (Rock or Cave)	Giant and Rock/Cave Toad	
Treant	D&D Expert Rules (1981, 1983)		
Triceratops	D&D Expert Rules (1981, 1983)		
Troglodyte	D&D Basic Rules (1981, 1983)		
Troll	D&D Basic Rules (1977), D&D Expert Rules (1981, 1983)		
Tyrannosaurus rex	D&D Expert Rules (1981, 1983)		
Undine	D&D Companion Rules (1984)		
Unicorn	D&D Basic Rules (1977), D&D Expert Rules (1981, 1983)		
Vampire	D&D Basic Rules (1977), D&D Expert Rules (1981, 1983)		
Weasel, giant	D&D Expert Rules (1981), D&D Companion Rules (1984)		
Wight	D&D Basic Rules (1977, 1981, 1983)		
Whales	D&D Expert Rules (1981) (Killer, Narwhal), D&D Companion Rules (1984) (Killer, Narwhal), D&D Expert Module X7 The War Rafts of Kron (1984) (Killer, Narwhal)	Killer whale, Great whale and Narwhal	
Wolf	D&D Basic Rules (1981, 1983)	Normal and dire	
Wraith	D&D Basic Rules (1977), D&D Expert Rules (1981, 1983)		
Wyvern	D&D Expert Rules (1981, 1983)		
Yellow Mold	D&D Basic Rules (1977, 1981, 1983)		
Zombie	D&D Basic Rules (1977, 1981, 1983)		

== See also ==
- Monsters in Dungeons & Dragons
- List of Dungeons & Dragons monsters (1974–76)
- List of Advanced Dungeons & Dragons 2nd edition monsters
- List of Dungeons & Dragons 3rd edition monsters
- List of Dungeons & Dragons 4th edition monsters
- List of Dungeons & Dragons 5th edition monsters
