= Twilight Calling =

Dungeons & Dragons adventure module

- Code: M3
- TSR product code: 9174
- Rules required: D&D Master Set
- Character levels: 30 - 35
- Campaign setting: Generic AD&D
- Authors: Tom Moldvay, Bruce Heard, Karen Martin, Rick Swan, Jennell Jaquays (Note: Credited as Paul Jaquays.), Kevin Stein and Robin Jenkins
- First published: 1986

Linked modules
- M1, M2, M3, M4, M5

Twilight Calling is an adventure module for the Dungeons & Dragons fantasy role-playing game, set in that game's Mystara campaign setting. TSR, Inc. published the module in 1986 for the D&D Master Set rules. It is part of the "M" series of modules. The module was designed by Tom Moldvay with additional design, development and editing by Bruce Heard, Karen Martin, Rick Swan, Jennell Jaquays, Kevin Stein and Robin Jenkins. Its cover art is by Ben Otero, with interior art by Larry Elmore and cartography by Diane & Dave Sutherland, Gloria Szopinski and Rob Peacock.

== Plot summary ==
Twilight Calling is an adventure in which the player characters enter the plane of nightmares, and then must cross through several hazardous pocket universes to get to Carnifex Castle.

The dark immortal Alphaks continues to gain power and influence for the Sphere of Entropy by tricking the player characters into releasing the ancient evil race of the Carnifex upon the world. They must find seven keys hidden in seven pocket universes to open a final gate to the Pit of Banishment. There the party must fight the Carnifex and prevent the invasion.

=== Table of contents ===
Chapter	Page
Introduction	2
Chapter 1: The Seven Realms	3
Chapter 2: Carnifex Castle	25
Playing Aids	13
Maps and Handouts	15-18

== Publication history ==
M3 Twilight Calling was written by Tom Moldvay, with a cover by Larry Elmore, and was published by TSR in 1986 as a 32-page booklet with an outer folder.

=== Credits ===
Design: Tom Moldvay
Additional design, development and editing: Bruce Heard, Karen Martin, Rick Swan, Jennell Jaquays, Kevin Stein and Robin Jenkins
Cover art: Ben Otero
Illustrations: Larry Elmore
Cartography: Diane & Dave Sutherland, Gloria Szopinski and Rob Peacock
Typesetting: Carolyn Vanderbilt

Distributed to the book trade in the United States by Random House, Inc., and in Canada by Random House of Canada, Ltd. Distributed to the toy and hobby trade by regional distributors. Distributed in the United Kingdom by TSR UK Ltd.

product number 9174
ISBN 0-88038-316-X

== See also ==
- List of Dungeons & Dragons modules
