= Robin Jenkins (game designer) =

American role-playing game designer

- Born: July 20, 1959 (age 66); Woodruff, Wisconsin
- Occupation: Game designer

Robin Jenkins (born July 20, 1959) is an American game designer who has worked primarily on role-playing games.

== Early life and education ==
Robin Jenkins was born July 20, 1959, in Woodruff, Wisconsin. He moved with his family all around the United States, but ultimately they returned to Wisconsin, where he graduated from high school at La Crosse. Jenkins worked as a journalist for his high-school newspaper — with additional responsibilities on the newspaper including photo editor, city editor, school editor, and editor-in-chief, and he commented: "I used to write out articles on the bus on the way to the printer".

Jenkins then attended the University of Wisconsin–La Crosse, but comments that "I did so well that I was asked to take a year's vacation to decide if college was where I really wanted to be." Jenkins became the director of a science-fiction convention that had A.E. Van Vogt as a host one year: "We decided to call it Attempt-A-Con because of all the problems we were having with it." Jenkins spent a year doing factory work, then he returned to college where he became the Assistant Arts Editor for college newspaper the Racquet, as well as the secretary for the Sigma Pi fraternity, the vice-chairman for the Lectures and Concerts Committee, and also the chairman of the Video Committee. Jenkins found an interest in early science-fiction and horror films such as Metropolis and Nosferatu. He was the first to graduate with honors in English in the five-year history of the program and with a minor in photography.

Jenkins found employment as a color printer and as a news cameraman for WXOW TV-19 in La Crosse, along with responsibilities in photography, film production, and commercial making. He moved to Madison, Wisconsin, and worked as a color printer for a photo lab while he wrote articles freelancing for regional business magazines and newspapers.

== Career ==
Robin Jenkins had been a gamer since 1976, and when he noticed an ad in a local paper for an assistant editorship at Dragon he applied at TSR, Inc., in May 1986 and was hired soon thereafter. Avalon Hill later hired Jenkins as a managing editor of roleplaying designs, where he supervised Tales from the Floating Vagabond and RuneQuest. Jenkins later became a full-time employee of Atlas Games.

His Dungeons & Dragons work includes Twilight Calling (1986), Five Coins for a Kingdom (1987), The Book of Lairs II (1987), and Country Sites (1995).
