= Five Coins for a Kingdom =

Dungeons & Dragons adventure module

- Code: M4
- TSR product code: 9204
- Rules required: D&D Master Set
- Character levels: 28 - 32
- Campaign setting: Generic AD&D
- Authors: Allen Varney
- First published: 1987

Linked modules
- M1, M2, M3, M4, M5

Five Coins for a Kingdom is an adventure module for the Dungeons & Dragons fantasy role-playing game, set in that game's Mystara campaign setting. TSR, Inc. published the module in 1987 for the D&D Master Set rules. It is part of the "M" series of modules. The module was designed by Allen Varney. Its cover art and interior art is by John and Laura Lakey, and cartography by William Reuter.

== Plot summary ==
Five Coins for a Kingdom is an adventure which involves a vanishing city and five magical coins.

On a clear day, bright lights appear in the sky over a vibrant city as the player characters stand in the market, and then the city vanishes, leaving the party alone in a grassy field. Five coins fall from sky, each imbued with the spirit of a power wizard beseeching the party to free them and save their world from destruction. Using the magic coins, the party travels to the outer plane of Eloysia, explore what is left of the city of Solius and free the wizards. Before saving Solius, the party must defeat an invasive army led by mad Durhan. Finally, the party journeys into their own sun to save their city.

=== Table of contents ===
Chapter	Page
Introduction	2
Chapter 1: A City Vanishes	3
Chapter 2: Hard Work for Small Pay	5
Chapter 3: Arrival in Eloysia	12
Chapter 4: Against Durhan	26
Chapter 5: Into the Sun	35
Appendix	39
Important NPCs	40

== Publication history ==
M4 Five Coins for a Kingdom was written by Allen Varney, with art by John and Laura Lakey, and was published by TSR in 1987 as a 40-page booklet with an outer folder. The scenario was adapted as The Vanishing City, #15 in the series of Advanced Dungeons & Dragons Adventure Gamebooks.

=== Credits ===
Design: Allen Varney
Cover Art: Ben Otero
Illustrations: John Lakey and Laura Lakey
Cartography: Wiliam Reuter
Typesetting: Betty Elmore

Distributed to the book trade in the United States by Random House, Inc., and in Canada by Random House of Canada, Ltd. Distributed to the toy and hobby trade by regional distributors. Distributed in the United Kingdom by TSR UK Ltd.

product number 9204
ISBN 0-88038-411-5

== See also ==
- List of Dungeons & Dragons modules
