= Earthshaker! =

Dungeons & Dragons adventure module

- Code: CM4
- TSR product code: 9128
- Rules required: Dungeons & Dragons Companion Set
- Character levels: 18 - 22
- Authors: David "Zeb" Cook
- First published: 1985

Linked modules
- CM1, CM2, CM3, CM4, CM5, CM6, CM7, CM8, CM9

Earthshaker! (ISBN 0-88038-196-5) is a 1985 adventure module for the Dungeons & Dragons roleplaying game. Its associated code is CM4 and the TSR product number is TSR 9128.

== Plot summary ==
Earthshaker! is an adventure scenario in which the player characters try to maintain rule over a dukedom, and must stop organized groups from taking control of a gigantic mechanical humanoid from inside of it.

The player characters are charged with the responsibility of stewardship over the barony of Vyolstagrad while the baron must attend the king's court. The matters are already difficult with internal and external problems, but then a strange carnival appears with a hugely tremendous exhibition: A colossal humanoid machine of iron, called the Earthshaker. While the machine itself poses no threat, a band of unscrupulous villains seek to attain control over this iron titan, and only the player characters stand in their way.

== Publication history ==
Earthshaker! was written by David "Zeb" Cook, with a cover by Clyde Caldwell, and was published by TSR in 1985 as a 24-page booklet with an outer folder.

== Credits ==
- David "Zeb" Cook: Design
- Steve Winter: Editing
- Clyde Caldwell: Cover art
- Ben Otero: Interior art
- David S. "Diesel" LaForce: Cartography
- Kim N. Lindau: Typesetting
- Ruth Hoyer: Art direction

== See also ==
- List of Dungeons & Dragons modules
