= Into the Maelstrom (Dungeons & Dragons) =

Dungeons & Dragons adventure module

- Code: M1
- TSR product code: 9159
- Rules required: D&D Master Set
- Character levels: 25 - 30
- Campaign setting: Generic
- Authors: Bruce Heard and Beatrice Heard
- First published: 1985

Linked modules
- M1, M2, M3, M4, M5

Into the Maelstrom is an adventure module for the Dungeons & Dragons fantasy role-playing game, set in that game's Mystara campaign setting. TSR, Inc. published the module in 1985 for the D&D Master Set rules. It is part of the "M" series of modules. The module was designed by Bruce and Beatrice Heard. Its cover art is by Jeff Easley, with interior art by Valerie Valusek and cartography by Dave LaForce.

== Plot summary ==
Into the Maelstrom is an adventure scenario in which the player characters lead a fleet of magical flying ships against an evil invading force.

The player characters are playthings of the gods as they strive to increase their power. The kingdom of Norwold is plagued by a gray-green poisonous fog that kills everything in its path and acid rain that creates dry barren soil. The player characters are summoned to the king's court, along with other soldiers and fleets, with the intention of attacking the prime suspect country. While crossing the ocean, the fleet is caught in a maelstrom that is really a gate to the Star Kingdoms. From there, the fleet must struggle to reach the Magic Mist, a gate home to a strange island spewing gray-green mist into the air. On the island, the party confronts the roaring demon Alphaks.

=== Table of contents ===
Chapter	Page
Introduction	2
Chapter 1: Into the Maelstrom	5
Chapter 2: Flight to the Star Kingdoms	8
Chapter 3: For the Glory of the Warlords	22
Chapter 4: Back Into the Maelstrom	26

== Publication history ==
M1 Into the Maelstrom was written by Bruce and Beatrice Heard, with a cover by Jeff Easley, and was published by TSR in 1985 as a 32-page booklet with an outer folder. The central part of the plot, travelling through the first part of the Star Kingdom, is heavily inspired by Homer's Odyssey.

=== Credits ===
Design: Bruce Heard and Beatrice Heard
Cover Art: Jeff Easley
Illustrations: Valerie Valusek
Cartography: Dave LaForce
Typesetting: Betty Elmore

Distributed to the book trade in the United States by Random House, Inc., and in Canada by Random House of Canada, Ltd. Distributed to the toy and hobby trade by regional distributors. Distributed in the United Kingdom by TSR UK Ltd., product number 9159 (ISBN 0-88038-244-9).

== See also ==
- List of Dungeons & Dragons modules
