= The Tree of Life (module) =

Dungeons & Dragons adventure module

- Code: CM7
- TSR product code: 9166
- Rules required: Dungeons & Dragons Companion Set
- Character levels: Elves 8
- Authors: Bruce A. Heard
- First published: 1986

Linked modules
- CM1, CM2, CM3, CM4, CM5, CM6, CM7, CM8, CM9

The Tree of Life is a 1986 adventure module for the Dungeons & Dragons roleplaying game. Its associated code is CM7.

== Plot synopsis ==
The Tree of Life is an adventure scenario for elf player characters who seek a cure for the ailment which is killing their Tree of Life.

The Feadiel clan's Tree of Life is dying. The best warriors in the clan are recruited to cure the tree; if it dies, all the elves will perish as well. The elves soon go to the deepest part of ancient Selinar, Elvenhome, to find the guarded grave of the first Treekeeper.

== Publication history ==
CM7 The Tree of Life was written by Bruce A. Heard, with a cover by Larry Elmore, and was published by TSR in 1986 as a 32-page booklet with an outer folder.

== See also ==
- List of Dungeons & Dragons modules
