= Talons of Night =

Dungeons & Dragons adventure module

- Code: M5
- TSR product code: 9214
- Rules required: D&D Master Set
- Character levels: 20 - 25
- Campaign setting: Mystara
- Authors: Jennell Jaquays (Note: Credited as Paul Jaquays.)
- First published: 1987

Linked modules
- M1, M2, M3, M4, M5

Talons of Night is an Egyptian-themed adventure module for the Dungeons & Dragons fantasy role-playing game, set in that game's Mystara campaign setting. TSR, Inc. published the module in 1987 for the D&D Master Set rules. It is part of the "M" series of modules. The module was designed by Jennell Jaquays. Its cover art is by Daniel Horne. Its interior art is by Jennell Jacquays, and cartography by Dennis Kauth and Steve Sullivan.

== Plot summary ==
Talons of Night is an adventure, sequel to Vengeance of Alphaks, in which the player characters contend with evil people from Thothia.

Peace negotiations between Thyatis and Alphatia are about to start, and the King of Norwold asks the player characters to get information about a previous agreement at the library of Edairo on the Isle of Dawn. At the library, the party receives clues and then travels to an ancient temple where there are puzzles to solve. From there, they seek the lair of the Night Spider and an ancient artifact. When the party returns to Helskir for the summit, they are framed for the kidnapping of the Emperor and Empress. The party must travel through the Outer Planes to the Sphere of Entropy and Entropy to rescue the royals and avert a world war.

=== Table of contents ===
Chapter	Page
Introduction	2
Chapter 1: The Quest for Peace	3
Chapter 2: Against Aran	20
Chapter 3: Journey into Night	35
Epilogue: The Helskir Summit	41
Appendices	42

== Publication history ==
M5 Talons of Night was written by Jennell Jaquays, with a cover by Daniel Horne and interior illustrations by Jaquays, and was published by TSR in 1987 as a 48-page booklet with an outer folder.

=== Credits ===
Design: Jennell Jaquays
Editor: Gary L. Thomas
Cover Art: Daniel Horne
Illustrations: Jennell Jaquays
Keyline: Stephanie Tabat
Cartography: Dennis Kauth, Steve Sullivan
Typesetting: Marilyn Favaro

Distributed to the book trade in the United States by Random House, Inc., and in Canada by Random House of Canada, Ltd. Distributed to the toy and hobby trade by regional distributors. Distributed in the United Kingdom by TSR UK Ltd.

product number 9214
ISBN 0-88038-411-5

== See also ==
- List of Dungeons & Dragons modules
