= Maze of the Riddling Minotaur =

Dungeons & Dragons adventure module

- The cover of the module, with art by Tim Truman, showing a Minotaur.
- Code: MSOLO2 (Originally M2)
- TSR product code: 9060
- Rules required: Dungeons & Dragons Expert Set
- Character levels: 1–10
- Authors: Jeff Grubb
- First published: July 1983

Linked modules
- MSOLO1, MSOLO2

Maze of the Riddling Minotaur is an adventure module published by TSR in 1983 for the Expert Set of the Dungeons & Dragons fantasy role-playing game. It is a solo adventure for one player character of level 1–10.

== Plot summary ==
Maze of the Riddling Minotaur is a solo adventure scenario meant to be played by a single player character, although the adventure can be adapted to play with a party of characters after it has been played as a solo adventure. The character is asked by the king to search a labyrinth full of monsters to find a kidnapped princess. The results of the player character's choices are written in invisible ink, which can be revealed using the special pen attached to the module.

== Publication history ==
Maze of the Riddling Minotaur was written by Jeff Grubb, with a cover by Tim Truman and interior illustrations by Keith Parkinson, and was published by TSR in 1983 as a 32-page booklet with an outer folder and an "invisible ink" pen attached to the folder. Its original module code was M2, but when TSR began publishing modules for the Master Set of Dungeons & Dragons, the code was reassigned to Vengeance of Alphaks.

== Reception ==
Kelly Grimes reviewed Maze of the Riddling Minotaur for Fantasy Gamer magazine and stated that "The module is worth its price if you intend to use it as a solo dungeon or to run a maze but don't want to work out the basic groundwork. It does present some nice building material as well as a couple of interesting new monsters. It is not, however, recommended for those GMs who wish to do nothing more to a module than read it over before running it for their party."

Chris Hunter reviewed the module for Imagine magazine, giving it a positive review. Hunter called it "a rescue the princess" scenario and noted that it is not an easy one. The labyrinth is laid out in such a way that the player has to go through most areas before reaching the goal. According to Hunter the text and diceless combat system are easy to follow and he came across only two minor mistakes. However, Hunter saw one problem with the invisible ink approach in that the size of the text box can give a hint as to the results of a choice. In addition, as in most solo adventures, player choices are quite limited. Hunter pointed out that, once it has been played through as a solo adventure, the module can be reused as a group adventure, where those behind the kidnapping of the princess can be revealed. Hunter concluded that buyers will likely enjoy this module, if they do not mind the limitations of solo adventures.
