= Country Sites =

Advanced Dungeons & Dragons game supplement

- Genre: Role-playing game
- Publisher: TSR
- Publication date: 1995
- Media type: Print

Country Sites is a supplement to the 2nd edition of the Advanced Dungeons & Dragons fantasy role-playing game.

== Contents ==
Country Sites is a supplement that includes seven large settings, such as The Haunted Temple, Sanctuary in the Sand, The City of the Dead, The Mariner's Graveyard, The Island of Lost Souls, Darion's Wall, and The Place of Broken Dreams. The set also includes four smaller settings, which consist of floor plans and background sites, which include examples of a toll-house and a waystation.

== Publication history ==
Country Sites was the final release for the "Sites" accessory series produced by TSR. Country Sites features design by Robin Jenkins, and design assistance by John Nephew (with Paul Numberger), and was published by TSR in 1995. The cover art was by Jennell Jaquays (Note: Credited as Paul Jaquays.) with interior art by Phillip Robb.

== Reception ==
David Comford reviewed Country Sites for Arcane magazine, rating it a 6 out of 10 overall. He cautions that the settings in this book "are frameworks for adventures. Taken as they are, the majority of the sites will prove to have many failings - lack of any reward for a PC's efforts being a major weakness." Comford advised ignoring the adventure hooks, calling them "very poor", but felt that the settings can be "salvaged with a little thought". He called The Haunted Temple and The Place of Broken Dreams "Prime examples" and found them interesting sites, "but with little hope for exciting roleplaying unless set as a divine test of faith or as a condition for level advancement". He commented on The City of the Dead, "where tomb robbing PCs find new surprises", and recommended Darion's Wall "to a certain extent [...] although avid readers of David Gemmel will surely have staged such an adventure". He said that Country Sites does succeed with The City of the Dead, The Mariner's Graveyard, The Island of Lost Souls, and Darion's Wall, as all four "offer a certain amount of originality and offer exciting scenarios for roleplaying, whether as part of an existing campaign or even as stand-alone adventures". He recommended that if the reader is "looking for a volume of amazing adventures - fully mapped, laid out and ready to use - then look elsewhere. If, on the other hand, you are looking for adventure ideas, then search no longer." He suggested that the book does have failings and that some reworking would be needed, and noted that for example there were no monster descriptions. Comford concluded by saying that "Country Sites, as with other volumes in the series, is a useful accessory, but by no means an essential one."
