= Test of the Warlords =

Dungeons & Dragons adventure module

- Cover art by Clyde Caldwell
- Code: CM1
- TSR product code: 9117
- Rules required: Dungeons & Dragons
- Character levels: 15+
- Campaign setting: Dungeons & Dragons
- Authors: Douglas Niles
- First published: 1984

Linked modules
- CM1, CM2, CM3, CM4, CM5, CM6, CM7, CM8, CM9

Test of the Warlords (ISBN 0-88038-116-7) is a 1984 adventure module for the Dungeons & Dragons roleplaying game. Its associated code is CM1 and is TSR's product number 9117. The adventure takes place in Norwold, which is located in the north east corner of the Known World on Mystara. This campaign contains elements of hack-and-slash adventure, political intrigue and full-scale war.

== Plot summary ==
Test of the Warlords is a campaign setting with an adventure scenario in which dominions are being set up in the land of Norwold.

The fame of the player characters have earned them the right and title to run a realm of their own, under the supervision of the king of Norwold, a newly colonized region to the north of Mystara. But even from the start, with all the troubles of establishing your own pockets of civilization in as yet untamed wilderness, Norworld has become the center of attention in the struggle between two old enemies: The sorcerous empire of Alphatia and the war-mongering realm of Thyatis.

== Publication history ==
CM1 Test of the Warlords was written by Douglas Niles, with a cover by Clyde Caldwell, and interior illustrations by Jeff Easley, and was published by TSR in 1984 as a 32-page booklet with an outer folder.

== Reception ==
The French RPG magazine La Gazette du Donjon gave this adventure a rating of 4 out of 5, saying, "Much more than a single scenario, this is intended to serve as a backstory to a game and to allow a campaign to be designed. It is very useful for dungeon masters inexperienced in management of 'high level' campaigns and who only have an approximate idea of how to assign and manage a domain."

== Table of Contents ==
Chapter	Page
Prologue: how to run this adventure	2
The setting: outlining Norworld and the Empires	4
Nonplayer Characters: Introducing Kings and Lords	9
Landgrab: Beginning the Adventure	12
Major Events: Bringing Dominions Together	14
Norworld Encounters: Expanding the Campaign	18
War of the Crowns: Running Campaign battles	28
Epilogue: Continuing the Campaign	30

== Credits ==
- Douglas Niles: Design
- Tim Kilpin: Editing
- Clyde Caldwell: Cover art
- Jeff Easley: Interior art
- Ruth Hoyer: Graphic design
- Diesel: Maps

== Notable nonplayer characters ==
- King Ericall of Norworld: lawful 28th level fighter ()
- Lernal the Swill: neutral 6th level fighter
- King Yarrvik the Just: lawful 9th level fighter (Oceansend)
- Tarn Oakleaf: neutral 24th level druid
- Madiera the Counselor: lawful 21st level magic user
- Christina Marie Alanira: Neutral 25th level magic-user
- Alak Dool: chaotic 19th level magic user
- Sir Ernest Day: lawful 16th level fighter
- Rutger Dag: neutral 15th level fighter
- Sandralane of Glantri: lawful 16th level cleric
- Max the First: chaotic 15th level fighter
- Alissa Patrician: lawful 15th level fighter
- Longtooth: chaotic 20th level thief
- Mequisa, the Lawful:
- Bethidia, the Neutral:
- Chasandri, the Chaotic:

== See also ==
- List of Dungeons & Dragons modules
