= Death's Ride =

Dungeons & Dragons adventure module

- Cover art by Jeff Easley
- Code: CM2
- TSR product code: 9118
- Rules required: Dungeons & Dragons
- Character levels: 15 - 20
- Authors: Garry Spiegle
- First published: 1984

Linked modules
- CM1, CM2, CM3, CM4, CM5, CM6, CM7, CM8, CM9

Death's Ride (ISBN 978-0-88038-117-8) is a 1984 adventure module for the Dungeons & Dragons roleplaying game. Its associated code is CM2. The module was designed by Garry Spiegle, with cover and interior art by Jeff Easley.

== Plot summary ==
Death's Ride is an adventure scenario in which the player characters investigate a barony in a distant location has cut off communications, and they encounter a wizard's tower and a village under control of undead creatures.

A strange black cloud hangs over the Norworld barony of Two Lake Vale, which is cut off from the rest of the world. As the player characters move to investigate, they encounter armies of the living dead and other vile creatures besieging the last pockets of human resistance. The only relief is to find and destroy the dreadful Deathstone, which is responsible for the black cloud, thereby facing the united forces of an evil sorcerer, a powerful priest, and a mighty dragon.

== Publication history ==
CM2 Death's Ride was written by Garry Spiegle, with art by Jeff Easley, and was published by TSR in 1984 as a 32-page booklet with an outer folder.

== Reception ==
Lawrence Schick, in his 1991 book Heroic Worlds, calls the module's cover "Striking".

The French RPG magazine La Gazette du Donjon gave this adventure a rating of 3 out of 5, saying, "This 'save the world' scenario is primarily intended for PCs who want to travel. Often referred to as an introductory module, it allows you to put in practice all the new rules discussed in the CM box. If your characters fail in their mission, the consequences for the region, even the world, could be dramatic."

== See also ==
- List of Dungeons & Dragons modules
