= Legacy of Blood (module) =

Dungeons & Dragons adventure module

- Code: CM9
- TSR product code: 9210
- Rules required: Dungeons & Dragons
- Character levels: 15 - 19
- Campaign setting: CM
- Authors: Steve Perrin & Katharine Kerr
- First published: 1987

Linked modules
- CM1, CM2, CM3, CM4, CM5, CM6, CM7, CM8, CM9

Legacy of Blood (ISBN 0-88038-487-5) is a 1987 adventure module for the Dungeons & Dragons roleplaying game. Its module code is CM9 and its TSR product code is TSR 9210.

== Plot summary ==
Legacy of Blood is an adventure in which one of the player characters has inherited rulership of Fenholm, and must deal with the challenges this brings.

The player character's cousin Rolph is dead, and as his heir, the player character was willed his dominion: Fenhold. The Deep Swamp is threatening to engulf all of this new holding. Problems occur, as people are seeing ghosts, disappearing without reason, and crops are suddenly blighted. The farmers do not like the swampdwellers, the swampdwellers don't like the farmers, and no one likes the halflings. It is the player character's task to resolve these issues.

== Publication history ==
CM9 Legacy of Blood was written by Steve Perrin and Katharine Kerr, with a cover by Clyde Caldwell, and was published by TSR in 1987 as a 32-page booklet with an outer folder.

=== Credits ===
- Steve Perrin: Design
- Katharine Kerr: Design
- Heike Kubasch: Editing
- Clyde Caldwell: Cover art
- Eric A. Gehlin: Interior art
- Betty Elmore: Typesetting
- Stephanie Tabat: Cartography
- Susan R. Myers: Cartography
- Gloria Habriga: Cartography
- David C. Sutherland III: Cartography
- Jon Jacobsen: Original cartography

== See also ==
- List of Dungeons & Dragons modules
