= The Endless Stair =

Dungeons & Dragons adventure module

- Code: CM8
- TSR product code: 9192
- Rules required: Dungeons & Dragons
- Character levels: 15 - 20
- Campaign setting: CM
- Authors: Ed Greenwood
- First published: 1987

Linked modules
- CM1, CM2, CM3, CM4, CM5, CM6, CM7, CM8, CM9

The Endless Stair is a 1987 adventure module for the Dungeons & Dragons role-playing game. Its associated code is CM8.

== Synopsis ==
The Endless Stair is a Companion Set adventure that begins at an inn. The player characters hear a rumor that leads them to a wizard's tomb. The characters are prompted to investigate what lies beyond a mysterious doorway which appears in the rocks on top of Glazar's Crag.

The Great Mage Cheiromar is said to be buried under the Leaning Stone atop Galzar's Crag. One of his apprentices, Ulthorn, was discovered dead in an aperture of the Leaning Stone (a doorway that reportedly never existed before). The player characters must discover how Ulthorn died and the mystery of the Leaning Stone. In the process they may find the Endless Stair which seems to lead nowhere. Those who tried to climb it never lived to tell the tale.

== Publication history ==
CM8 The Endless Stair was written by Ed Greenwood, and published by TSR in 1987 as a 32-page booklet with an outer folder. Jack Fred provided the page art.

== Reception ==
James Wallis reviewed The Endless Stair for British magazine Adventurer #11 (June/July 1987). He commented, "It's nice to see that TSR can still churn them out. What we have here is a typical D&D Companion Set adventure. It starts (can you guess?) in an inn. Something Suspicious Happens and the party get a rumour. They follow up the rumour and find (gasp!) a Wizard's Tomb, complete with the Far Freaking Weird Powerful Magic Item, the Standard Non-Existent Page Reference and the standard TSR Glaring Inconsistency. The party follow up on a lead; they get here and, harassed by NPCs, finally get to the Endless Stair..." Wallis commented more seriously: "This adventure is competently written, apart from a couple of minor errors, and would doubtless make an enjoyable week-end's play. The trouble is that it lacks any kind of variety from standard D&D fare: it could be a first-level adventure except for the powerful NPCs, magic items and monsters. [...] It's a pity that with products of the quality of The Grand Duchy of Karameikos coming out for D&D, this is the best that can be done in the way of adventures."

== See also ==
- List of Dungeons & Dragons modules
