= Mystery of the Snow Pearls =

Dungeons & Dragons adventure module

- Code: CM5
- TSR product code: 9154
- Rules required: Dungeons & Dragons
- Character levels: solo 10
- Authors: Anne Gray McCready
- First published: 1985

Linked modules
- CM1, CM2, CM3, CM4, CM5, CM6, CM7, CM8, CM9

Mystery of the Snow Pearls (ISBN 0-88038-196-5) is a 1985 adventure module for the Dungeons & Dragons roleplaying game. Its associated code is CM5 and the TSR product number is TSR 9154.

== Synopsis ==
Mystery of the Snow Pearls is a solo adventure scenario for one player character who will need to answer the riddles of an evil mage to get back the magic pearl that keeps the character's village safe; the adventure can also be adapted to use with a party of player characters.

The player character is a Companion level elf, responsible for safeguarding one of the four, magical pearls that protect the land of Tarylon. Milgo, an evil wizard with a sense of humour, challenges the elf to find and return the lost item. Without it, the entire region is threatened.

This adventure includes a piece of colored film known as a "Magic Viewer" that allows the players to read the hidden results of their choices in the text. This includes encounters, puzzles, and traps.

== Publication history ==
Mystery of the Snow Pearls was written by Anne Gray McCready, with a cover by Larry Elmore, and was published by TSR in 1985 as a 32-page booklet with an outer folder, and also includes a large map and colored film.

== See also ==
- List of Dungeons & Dragons modules
