= Vengeance of Alphaks =

Dungeons & Dragons adventure module

- Code: M2
- TSR product code: 9148
- Rules required: D&D Master Set
- Character levels: 28 - 32
- Campaign setting: Generic D&D
- Authors: Skip Williams
- First published: 1986

Linked modules
- M1, M2, M3, M4, M5

Vengeance of Alphaks is an adventure module for the Dungeons & Dragons fantasy role-playing game, set in that game's Mystara campaign setting. TSR, Inc. published the module in 1986 for the D&D Master Set rules. It is part of the "M" series of modules. The module was designed by Skip Williams. Its cover art is by Jeff Easley, with interior art by Mark Nelson and cartography by David C. Sutherland III.

== Plot summary ==
Vengeance of Alphaks is an adventure in which an Immortal returns from the plane of entropy to once again terrorize the world.

The immortal Alphaks seeks revenge against the human race by provoking conflict and fomenting war. Strange dreams warn the player characters of impending battles and treachery. During a battle against dragons and giants, a visiting cleric provides information on the source of the trouble, and the party explores Coiger's Lair. In a lower level, they must solve logic puzzles to deactivate magic pillars creating earthquake beetles. In a final battle, powerful armies contest for the city of Alpha and control of Norwold.

=== Table of contents ===
Chapter	Page
Introduction	2
Chapter 1: Dawn of the Giants	4
Chapter 2: Coiger's Lair	8
Chapter 3: Night of the Beetles	12
Chapter 4: Chaos Returns	20
Chapter 5: The Flying Castle	26
Appendix	30

== Publication history ==
M2 Vengeance of Alphaks was written by Skip Williams, with a cover by Jeff Easley and interior illustrations by Mark Nelson, and was published by TSR in 1986 as a 32-page booklet with an outer folder. This is a sequel to M1 Into the Maelstrom.

=== Credits ===
Design: Skip Williams
Cover Art: Jeff Easley
Illustrations: Mark Nelson
Cartography: David C. Sutherland III
Typesetting: Betty Elmore

Distributed to the book trade in the United States by Random House, Inc., and in Canada by Random House of Canada, Ltd. Distributed to the toy and hobby trade by regional distributors. Distributed in the United Kingdom by TSR UK Ltd.

product number 9148
ISBN 0-88038-271-6

== See also ==
- List of Dungeons & Dragons modules
