= Where Chaos Reigns =

1985 Dungeons & Dragons module

- Code: CM6
- TSR product code: 9158
- Rules required: Dungeons & Dragons
- Character levels: 17–19
- Campaign setting: CM
- Authors: Graeme Morris
- First published: 1985

Linked modules
- CM1, CM2, CM3, CM4, CM5, CM6, CM7, CM8, CM9

Where Chaos Reigns is a 1985 adventure module for the Dungeons & Dragons roleplaying game. Its associated code is CM6.

== Plot synopsis ==
Where Chaos Reigns is an adventure in which the player characters time travel to four alternate realities to save their own reality.

The player characters are chosen by mysterious forces to fix a breakdown in reality. Far away in dimensions, is Aelos, where time is breaking down. This is affecting the 'main' reality. For example, flowers bloom out of season, fish fall out of the sky and the moon has turned blue. Even the entities known as the 'Immortals' are powerless to help, it is up to the player characters.

== Publication history ==
CM6 Where Chaos Reigns was written by Graeme Morris with Jim Bambra and Phil Gallagher, with a cover by Brian Williams and interior illustrations by Jez Goodwin, and was published by TSR in 1985 as a 24-page booklet with an outer folder.

== See also ==
- List of Dungeons & Dragons modules
