= Sabre River =

Dungeons & Dragons adventure module

- Code: CM3
- TSR product code: 9119
- Rules required: Dungeons & Dragons, 1st ED
- Character levels: 18 - 22
- Campaign setting: CM
- Authors: Douglas Niles and Bruce Nesmith
- First published: 1984

Linked modules
- CM1, CM2, CM3, CM4, CM5, CM6, CM7, CM8, CM9

Sabre River is a 1984 adventure module for the Dungeons & Dragons roleplaying game. Its associated product code is CM3.

== Plot summary ==
Sabre River is an adventure in which the player characters must go to the Tower of Terror where they explore a dungeon setting located inside an active volcano, and take a journey on an underground river.

A mysterious curse has hit a barony in the realm of Norwold: The waters of the Sabre River have been tainted, bringing death or evilness to all who drink from them. The player characters are charged to seek out the source of this curse, in the company of Cutter, a young boy who is strangely immune to the effects of the curse. In fact, Cutter plays a more vital role in the restoring of Sabre River than one would expect.

== Publication history ==
CM3 Sabre River was written by Douglas Niles and Bruce Nesmith, with a cover by Keith Parkinson, and was published by TSR in 1984 as a 32-page booklet with an outer folder.

== See also ==
- List of Dungeons & Dragons modules
