= Dungeons & Dragons Master Rules =

Tabletop role-playing game supplement for Dungeons & Dragons

- Author: Frank Mentzer
- Genre: Role-playing game
- Publisher: TSR
- Publication date: 1985

Dungeons & Dragons Master Rules is an expansion boxed set for the Dungeons & Dragons (D&D) fantasy role-playing game. It was first published in 1985 as an expansion to the Basic Set.

== Publication history ==
The Dungeons & Dragons Basic Set was revised in 1983 by Frank Mentzer, this time as Dungeons & Dragons Set 1: Basic Rules. Between 1983 and 1985, this system was expanded by Mentzer as a series of five boxed sets, including the Basic Rules, Expert Rules (supporting character levels 4 through 14), Companion Rules (supporting levels 15 through 25), Master Rules (supporting levels 26 through 36), and Immortal Rules (supporting Immortals - characters who had transcended levels). The Master Rules set was a boxed set which included a 32-page Master Player's Book and a 64-page Master DM's Book. The books were written by Frank Mentzer and edited by Barbara Green Deer, Anne C. Gray, and Mike Breault, with cover artwork by Larry Elmore and interior illustrations by Jeff Easley and Roger Raupp.

== Contents ==
The Master Player's Book adds to the existing spell lists for the cleric, magic-user, and druid classes. It introduces the mystic class, an empty hand warrior. The book adds to the available range of attack ranks that are meant for demihuman characters. The book provides rules for Weapons Mastery, a type of weapon specialization and proficiency, where the character rises from a Novice to the rank of Grand Master. There is also a table listing all weapons in the D&D game, including any usage restrictions (such as being two-handed, or only for melee), costs, weights, how much damage at each Mastery level, defensive uses, and any special effects. This book contains rules for how experience points, abilities, and spells function with higher-level characters, as well as new armor and weapons, and rules for sieges and siege equipment.

The majority of the Master DM's Book features additions to the lists of magic items and monsters. This book provides a set of strict guidelines for the DM on how to handle a campaign involving such high-magic, super-powerful characters, including the paperwork involved in running small empires, and information on how to balance encounters. The book introduces the concept of Anti-Magic, which Immortals and particular monsters such beholders possess, which decreases or eliminates magical effects within its area of effect. This book contains rules for realms ruled by player characters, alterations to reality, nonhuman spellcaster characters, and magic artifacts.

== Reception ==
The Master Rules set was reviewed by Paul Cockburn in issue 73 of White Dwarf magazine (January 1986), rating it 8 out of 10 overall. Cockburn felt that "the Masters Set doesn't leave you gasping for something simple" and it is "an intelligent, subtle and interesting extension to the game".
