= Creature Catalogue =

Tabletop role-playing game supplement for Dungeons & Dragons

- Creature Catalogue Module Cover.
- Code: AC9
- TSR product code: 9173
- Rules required: Basic D&D
- Character levels: 1 - 36
- Campaign setting: Generic
- Authors: Jim Bambra, Phil Gallagher, Graeme Morris
- First published: 1986

Linked modules
- AC1, AC2, AC3, AC4, AC5, AC6, AC7, AC8, AC9, AC10, AC11, AC1010, AC1011

Creature Catalogue is a supplement for Basic Dungeons & Dragons first released in 1986, and updated in 1993.

== Contents ==
The Creature Catalogue is a supplement which presents game statistics for more than 200 monsters, most of which had been compiled from previous D&D rules set and adventure modules, as well as 80 new monsters which had never been printed before; each monster features an illustration and they are indexed by what habitat they can be encountered in.

In Creature Catalogue is collected all the creatures first presented in the official D&D adventure modules to that time, plus many new creatures and some converted from AD&D. Also included is a comprehensive index of all D&D monsters found in the Basic, Expert, Companion and Master rulesets.

Each creature in the book is illustrated, and the entries in the book are arranged by type of creature rather than alphabetically. This includes six sections: Animals (along with giant and extinct creatures), Conjurations (such as elementals and golems), Humanoids, Lowlife (such as insects, plants, and jellies and slimes), Monsters (a miscellaneous category), and Undead. Each monster has its Intelligence score listed as part of its statistics. The book also includes a comprehensive index of monsters sorted by environment, and the introduction of the book reproduced a guide by Frank Mentzer on how to balance monster encounters properly for the levels of the player characters, which was originally printed in the Master Set.

Each creature is listed with appropriate D&D statistics and a short description of the creature, its abilities and tactics. A variety of authors and artists combined to the listings including Zeb Cook and Gary Gygax.

== Publication history ==
AC9 Creature Catalogue was compiled by Graeme Morris, Phil Gallagher, and Jim Bambra, and was published by TSR in 1986. The Creature Catalogue is in the format of a 96-page perfect-bound book, which TSR had been adopting more frequently at the time. Cover art is by Keith Parkinson.

An updated version, titled Creature Catalog, was released in March 1993 as accessory "DMR2", part of the "Challenger Series" of Basic D&D accessories that followed the 1991 release of the revised "black box" basic set and the Rules Cyclopedia.

== Reception ==
Tim Brinsley reviewed the Creature Catalogue for White Dwarf No. 85. Brinsley quipped that the book "is basically a Monster Manual for the D&D game". He noted that the book was produced in the UK, and believed that unlike TSR UK's last attempt at a monster book, "the disappointing Fiend Folio with its many one-use creatures", there was a lot in this book to recommend it. Brinsley felt that organizing the book in sections by type of creature rather than just alphabetically like AD&D's Monster Manuals "should certainly make life easier for those DMs who design their own adventures, and know what sort of monster they want, rather than by name". He also felt that the comprehensive references to all the monsters appearing in the D&D boxed sets would solve the problem of having to remember in which set a particular monster appears. He concluded the review by stating, "basically, this book contains all you could ever wish to know about monsters in the D&D game, no matter what level your characters are ... if you've ever felt constrained by the limited range of D&D monsters, then this book is for you."

Keith Eisenbeis reviewed the updated product in a 1993 issue of White Wolf. He stated that "this accessory is a worthy product offering a solid selection of creatures for use in any Dungeons and Dragons campaign". He rated it overall at a 3 out of 5 possible points.
