= Skarda's Mirror =

Dungeons & Dragons adventure module

- Code: X12
- TSR product code: 9188
- Rules required: D&D Expert Set
- Character levels: 5-8
- Authors: Aaron Allston
- First published: 1987

Linked modules
- X1, X2, X3, X4, X5, X6, X7, X8, X9, X10, X11, X12, X13, XL1, XSOLO, XS2

Skarda's Mirror is an adventure module for the Dungeons & Dragons fantasy role-playing game. It was published by TSR in 1987, and designed by Aaron Allston. Its cover art is by Tim Hildebrandt with interior art by Al Williamson and Jeff Easley, and cartography by Dave S. LaForce, Dennis Kauth, and David C. Sutherland III.. The module's associated code is X12 and its TSR product code is TSR 9188. This module was developed and intended for use with the Dungeons & Dragons Expert Set and Companion Set rules.

== Plot summary ==
Skarda's Mirror is an adventure scenario in which the player characters enter another dimension through a magical mirror to rescue those who are trapped within.

The wizard Skarda and his band of raiders once terrorized the rural settlements of the Grand Duchy of Karameikos, kidnapping everyone and taking their treasure. By chance, he was discovered by famous adventurer Lord Retameron in Specularum. In the aftermath of the raid, Skarda (alias Mallek) was left trapped in his burning house. A search of the wreckage found papers describing his role in the raids and outlining a coup against the Duke, and a magical mirror of great power. Retameron kept the mirror and brought it to his tower. One night, both he and his wife Halia gazed into the mirror and disappeared, and in their place appeared large baboon-like creatures with huge teeth that attacked everyone in sight. So far, no one has come out of the tower alive. Retameron's father finds the player characters and pleads with them to enter the tower and rescue his son.

== Publication history ==
X12 Skarda's Mirror was written by Aaron Allston, with a cover by Tim Hildebrandt and interior illustrations by Al Williamson, and was published by TSR in 1987 as a 48-page booklet with an outer folder.
