= Crown of Ancient Glory =

Dungeons & Dragons adventure module

- Code: X13
- TSR product code: 9218
- Rules required: D&D Expert Set
- Character levels: 7-10
- Authors: Stephen Bourne
- First published: 1987

Linked modules
- X1, X2, X3, X4, X5, X6, X7, X8, X9, X10, X11, X12, X13, XL1, XSOLO, XS2

Crown of Ancient Glory is an adventure module for the Dungeons & Dragons fantasy role-playing game. It was published by TSR in 1987, and designed by Stephen Bourne. Its cover art is by Keith Parkinson, with interior art by Chris Miller and cartography by Dave S. LaForce. The module's associated code is X13 and its TSR product code is TSR 9218. This module was developed and intended for use with the Dungeons & Dragons Expert Set and Companion Set rules.

== Plot summary ==
Crown of Ancient Glory is an adventure in which the player characters need to locate the heir to the kingdom of Vestland and find the magical Sonora Crown so that they can help unite the country before an invasion by the Ethengar Khanate. The module also contains deck plans for a longship.

The High King of Vestland has recently died. The characters must recover the missing holy Sonora Crown, a powerful artifact. The heir to the kingdom was lost at birth, and the character must determine the identity and location of the lawful heir of Vestland. The characters must deal with traitors and spies from within, while invaders from the forces of the Ethengar Khanate mass on the borders to take advantage of the situation in Vestland.

== Publication history ==
X13 Crown of Ancient Glory was written by Stephen Bourne, with a cover by Keith Parkinson and interior illustrations by Chris Miller, and was published by TSR in 1987 as a 64-page booklet with an outer folder.
