= Red Arrow, Black Shield =

Dungeons & Dragons adventure module

- Code: X10
- TSR product code: 9160
- Rules required: D&D Expert Set
- Character levels: 10–14
- Authors: Michael S. Dobson
- First published: 1985

Linked modules
- X1, X2, X3, X4, X5, X6, X7, X8, X9, X10, X11, X12, X13, XL1, XSOLO, XS2

Red Arrow, Black Shield is an adventure module for the Dungeons & Dragons fantasy role-playing game. It was published by TSR in 1985, and designed by Michael S. Dobson. Its cover art is by Jeff Easley, and cartography by Dennis Kauth. The module's associated code is X10 and its TSR product code is TSR 9160. This module was developed and intended for use with the Dungeons & Dragons Expert Set and Companion Set rules.

== Plot summary ==
Red Arrow, Black Shield is an adventure in which the player characters must defend Darokin, which is the next invasion target after the Desert Nomads conquer Akesoli.

The player characters lead diplomatic missions and armies against the Desert Nomads and their evil leader, The Master. With the Nomadic invasion of Akesoli, the Republic of Darokin prepares for war.

This module is billed as "A BATTLESYSTEM™ Game/War Machine Spectacular!" It uses the mass combat "War Machine" rules from the Companion Set, and the Battlesystem Fantasy Combat Supplement included with the module, as well as a large map of Mystara and strategy game tokens. There are a number of "Chase Flow Charts" used to direct encounters through an abstracted landscape as players pursue others or are pursued themselves through the streets.

== Publication history ==
X10 Red Arrow, Black Shield was written by Michael S. Dobson, with a cover by Jeff Easley, and was published by TSR in 1985 as a 48-page book, large color map, cardboard counter sheet, small zip-locked bag, and an outer folder.

Because of the political ramifications of the war depicted in this module, The Grand Duchy of Karameikos, and the subsequent D&D Gazetteers published in 1987 and later, state that Red Arrow, Black Shield takes place 200 years in the future.

== Reviews ==
- GameMaster Publications (Issue 3 - Mar 1986)
