= Master Player Screen =

Tabletop role-playing game supplement for Dungeons & Dragons

- Cover art by Larry Elmore
- Code: AC7
- TSR product code: 9156
- Rules required: Dungeons & Dragons Basic, Expert, Companion, and Master Sets.
- Authors: Bruce Nesmith
- First published: 1985

Linked modules
- AC1, AC2, AC3, AC4, AC5, AC6, AC7, AC8, AC9, AC10, AC11, AC1010, AC1011

Master Player Screen is an gamemaster's screen published by TSR in 1985 that is designed for use with the fantasy role-playing game Dungeons & Dragons (D&D). A booklet with a brief high-level adventure scenario is included with the screen.

== Description ==
Master Player Screen is a 3-panel gamemaster's screen designed for play with the Basic, Expert, Companion and Master Rules of D&D for characters from 1st to 36th lvel. The side facing the DM contains tables for:

- THAC0
- Saving throws
- Thief special abilities and experience table.
- Cleric turning undead
- Spell lists for clerics, druids and magic-users

The side facing the players contains cover art by Larry Elmore, the back cover description of the package, and a table for experience levels for all classes.

=== The Spindle ===
An 8-page booklet included in the package contains a short adventure, "The Spindle", written by Bruce Nesmith, with interior art by Clyde Caldwell and cartography by Tom Darden. The adventure is Master Level, designed for high-level character classes between 26th and 36th level.

The module is set in Mystara, where the adventurers hear rumors in the village of Nareeb about the mysterious "Spindle of Heaven" found at the top of a mountain; it will apparently provide a clue to the secret of immortality. They must travel across a desert, encountering many monsters, to reach the mountain's inner sanctum and face the Master of the Spindle.

At the end of the adventure, the DM can continue the players' quest for immortality by designing further adventures.

==== Enemies encountered in the adventure ====
* Airdrake
- Black Pudding
- Djinni, Lesser
- Druj
- Elemental, Air
- Giant, Cloud
- Gray ooze
- Hobgoblin
- Invisible stalker
- Manscorpion
- Rust monster
- Scorpion, Gargantuan
- Sphinx
- Vampire

== Publication history ==
After publishing D&D in 1974, TSR split the game into two branches in 1977: Basic D&D and Advanced Dungeons & Dragons. Basic D&D was for character levels 1-3; this was followed by the Expert Set in 1981 that supported levels 4–14, and in 1983, the Companion Rules (levels 15–25) and the Master Rules (levels 26–36). To support the B.E.C.M. set of rules, TSR released a series of "Accessory Modules". The seventh publication in this series was AC7 Master Player Screen released in 1985.

== Reception ==
In Issue 37 of Abyss, Dave Nalle found the screen "has the information you need to run D&D at this level" but noted "Because of the way it is folded so that it can have a cover and a blurb, the spell lists are on the DM side, when they really should be on the player side with the experience tables." Nalle thought the included adventure was "dominated by combat, a miniature version of the standard TSR formula." Nalle also questioned if the adventure would trouble a party of high-level characters, commenting "from the characters I've seen at this level this scenario would be a breeze ... a normal-sized party of 4–6 characters would never even have to breathe hard." Nalle concluded on an ambivalent note, writing, "I can neither reject or recommend this aid. For those that use DM screens, it will work. For those that do not, it is of no interest."
