= The Book of Marvelous Magic =

Tabletop role-playing game supplement for Dungeons & Dragons

- The cover of The Book of Marvelous Magic (Accessory AC4) shows a female mage in dark robes with arms raised (art by Clyde Caldwell).
- Code: AC4
- TSR product code: 9116
- Rules required: Dungeons & Dragons Basic, Expert, Companion Sets
- Campaign setting: Mystara or Generic
- Authors: Gary Gygax and Frank Mentzer
- First published: 1984

Linked modules
- AC1, AC2, AC3, AC4, AC5, AC6, AC7, AC8, AC9, AC10, AC11, AC1010, AC1011

AC4 - The Book of Marvelous Magic is a 76-page book by Frank Mentzer and Gary Gygax published in 1985 by TSR, Inc. It is an accessory to Dungeons & Dragons primarily for use with the non-advanced box set versions; an appendix describes how the items described can be used with the AD&D game.

== Contents ==
The Book of Marvelous Magic is an alphabetical listing of more than 500 magic items, sorted by item type. It contains an appendix with instructions for using the items with the Advanced Dungeons & Dragons rules. This book is a sourcebook on magical items and their twists and quirks. As well as all the miscellaneous magical items that appeared in the D&D Basic, Expert, and Companion Sets, over 500 new magical items are described in detail. Each item comes with a brief description and an explanation of its powers. The items are listed in alphabetical order by type of item. For example, under Blanket can be found the Blanket of Devouring, the Blanket of Protection, and the Blanket of Sleeping.

=== Example ===
Chime of Visitors This simple metal stick is 3 inches long and made of a silvery metal. It keeps time as a chime of time but with an unusual side effect. If it rings while within 60 feet of any ordinary or otherwise known door, all creatures hearing the chime must make a saving throw vs. spells; all victims who fail the throw must go to the nearest door and open it or attempt to do so for at least six rounds.

== Publication history ==
AC4 The Book of Marvelous Magic was written by Frank Mentzer and Gary Gygax, with a cover by Clyde Caldwell and interior art by Doug Watson, and was published by TSR in 1984 as an 80-page book (item code TSR 9116 and ISBN 0-88038-192-2).

== Reception ==
Jez Keen reviewed the accessory for Imagine magazine, giving it a negative review. Keen wrote that the items on offer fall into three categories, "sensible ones, the bad-play compensatory ones and the silly ones". Overall, the reviewer thought that in Basic D&D games magic items can be much too common. If magic was appropriately rare, this publication would not be needed. So Keen recommended it only for those who think that there should be "magic items at every street corner", as some items will be useful and some humorous. Ultimately though, Keen thought that gamemasters would be better off creating their own magic items.

== Reviews ==
- Game News #6 (Aug., 1985)
