= The Savage Coast =

Dungeons & Dragons adventure module

- Code: X9
- TSR product code: 9129
- Rules required: D&D Expert Set
- Character levels: 4-10
- Authors: Merle and Jackie Rasmussen and Anne C. Gray
- First published: 1985

Linked modules
- X1, X2, X3, X4, X5, X6, X7, X8, X9, X10, X11, X12, X13, XL1, XSOLO, XS2

The Savage Coast is an adventure module for the Dungeons & Dragons fantasy role-playing game. It was published by TSR in 1985, and designed by Merle and Jackie Rasmussen and Anne C. Gray. Its graphic designer is Ruth Hoyer, the cover art is by Keith Parkinson, and cartography by Dave "Diesel" LaForce. The module's associated code is X9 and its TSR product code is TSR 9129. This module was developed and intended for use with the Dungeons & Dragons Expert Set and Companion Set rules.

== Plot summary ==
The Savage Coast is an adventure scenario in which the player characters travel the wilderness of the Orcs Head Peninsula on the region known as the Savage Coast.

In the safe, seaside town of Slagovich, the player characters set anchor and stay at the inn, where they hear stories of Orcs Head Peninsula. Lost cities full of hidden treasures, terrible beasts and cannibals roaming the coast, gold ore piling up at the mouths of rivers, and a secretive religious sect. What would motivate the adventurers to enter the uncharted jungles of the Savage Coast—curiosity, a desire to help others, or simple greed?

== Publication history ==
X9 The Savage Coast was written by Merle and Jackie Rasmussen, and Anne C. Gray, with a cover by Keith Parkinson and interior illustrations by Mark Nelson, and was published by TSR in 1985 as a 32-page booklet with an outer folder.
