= Merle M. Rasmussen =

American role-playing game designer

Merle Martin Rasmussen
- Born: United States
- Occupation(s): Game designer, writer

Merle Martin Rasmussen is an American game designer and writer known for creating the espionage role-playing game Top Secret.

== Education ==
Merle Rasmussen graduated from high school in Underwood, Iowa in 1975 and began classes to become a civil engineer (later a pre-professional medicine major) at Iowa State University that same year.

== Career ==
In his Iowa State dormitory in 1975, Rasmussen began to develop and playtest an espionage simulation with his friends, and the next year he wrote to TSR to see if the game could be published; he received a response letter from Mike Carr wishing to review the game, and by the next year the simulation had the working title of Top Secret, which was eventually accepted for publication in 1978. Allen Hammack was assigned to the project as an editor, and worked with Rasmussen on rules clarifications and editing. While the game was under development, Rasmussen lived in Iowa and worked on the graveyard shift as an orderly in a Council Bluffs hospital and as a production technician in the Media Production Department of an educational agency. He was also the President of Game Room Productions, Ltd., in Minden, Iowa, a position he had held since June 1979.

When Rasmussen's Top Secret was released in 1980, it was the sixth role-playing game published by TSR, and was also the first espionage role-playing game ever published.

In 1982, at the age of 25, Rasmussen was hired by TSR as a full-time employee to write adventures for the Basic and Expert Sets of Dungeons & Dragons. His writing credits included:

- Quagmire! (X6)
- Lathan's Gold (XSOLO)
- Ghost of Lion Castle (BSOLO)
- Midnight on Dagger Alley (AD&D MV-1)
- The Savage Coast (X9)

Both Quagmire! and The Savage Coast were released after Rasmussen was laid off by TSR in 1984.

Rasmussen also authored several other role-playing game related titles such as Top Secret Companion. Jackie and Merle Rasmussen wrote a two-part adventure using the D&D Expert Set rules titled "Tortles of the Purple Sage" that appeared in Dungeon #6 (July/August 1987) and #7 (September/October 1987).

Rasmussen returned to the Top Secret franchise in 2015, working again with Allen Hammack to design an updated version titled Top Secret: New World Order that was released in 2017.
