= Castle Amber =

Castle Amber may refer to:

- Castle Amber (module), a Dungeons & Dragons adventure module
- Castle Amber, a central location (and habitat of most major characters) in the fantasy novel series The Chronicles of Amber by Roger Zelazny
