= Curse of Xanathon =

Dungeons & Dragons adventure module

- Cover art by Timothy Truman
- Code: X3
- TSR product code: 9056
- Rules required: D&D Expert Set
- Character levels: 5-7
- Campaign setting: Mystara
- Authors: Douglas Niles
- First published: 1982

Linked modules
- X1, X2, X3, X4, X5, X6, X7, X8, X9, X10, X11, X12, X13, XL1, XSOLO, XS2

Curse of Xanathon is a Dungeons & Dragons adventure module designed by Douglas Niles for use with the D&D Expert Set. It was published by TSR, Inc. (TSR) in 1982 and is designed for 5–8 player characters of level 5–7.

== Plot summary ==
Curse of Xanathon is an adventure in which the Duke of Rhoona begins issuing unusual decrees, such as ordering that the people must pay their taxes using beer instead of money, people must ride their horses backwards, and that dwarves must have their beards shaved and their bodies stretched to make them "presentable to human sensibilities". Duke Stephan is suffering from a curse which was brought upon him by Xanathon, chief cleric of the Ethengar Khanate immigrants living inside Rhoona's walls, and Stephen's own treacherous guard captain, Draco Stormsailer.

The player characters must discover the nature of the Duke's affliction. They will need to end the curse on the Duke so that he can lead his forces against an army of invaders. To do this, they need to find the antidote for the curse. They must battle Xanathon, Draco, and their minions to achieve this goal.

Lawrence Schick, in his sourcebook of roleplaying games, Heroic Worlds, describes the module as a town adventure in which the players are tasked with solving a mystery to remove a curse. The cursed town is threatened by a dwarven army, and the player characters must save the town.

== Publication history ==
X3 Curse of Xanathon was written by Douglas Niles, with art by Tim Truman, and published by TSR in 1982 as a 32-page booklet with an outer folder. The module was designed as an adventure for 5th-7th level D&D characters. It was developed by Douglas Niles and Alan Hammack, and edited by Deborah Campbell Ritchie.

== Reception ==
Doug Cowie gave the module a positive review in Imagine magazine, calling it a "welcome addition to the list of Expert Set modules." However, Cowie noted that the detective-style module required the player characters to proceed in an orderly fashion through five scenarios, and commented "No party of players that I have known ever does what they are supposed to, in the right order, through five different adventures." Cowie also pointed out that the players are railroaded by a non-player character who "pops up whenever the party is going astray" and that three of the five adventures are initiated by an appearance of the ducal herald. In spite of this, Cowie thought that "this is a good module to play", and he specifically praised the way the town is presented. He concluded by calling it "a module rich in character and invention ... although it is unlikely that any party will follow through the story line [...] without a lot of guidance."

In Issue 48 of White Dwarf, Jim Bambra called Curse of Xanathon a "detective adventure ... very much a programmed affair [where] players move through a series of distinct and logical stages, discovering clues as they go." Bambra pointed out that if the players fail to follow the clues, the Dungeon Master must direct them to the next encounter, which cuts down on the amount of freedom available to them. Bambra concluded by giving the adventure a rating of 7 out of 10, stating that the module was not as good as contemporaneous adventures released for Advanced Dungeons & Dragons, but thought it was superior to the two modules preceding it in the series, Isle of Dread and Castle Amber.

The French RPG magazine La Gazette du Donjon gave this adventure a rating of 4 out of 5, saying, "This scenario has an impressive background. The plot is very enjoyable, with conspiracies, civil war and invasion awaiting your characters. The investigations are a little too simple, but the city is very pleasantly described with lots of details ... This module will delight players if it is led by a good DM."
