= Master of the Desert Nomads =

Dungeons & Dragons adventure module

- Cover art by Harry Quinn
- Code: X4
- TSR product code: 9068
- Rules required: D&D Expert Set
- Character levels: 6-9
- Campaign setting: Mystara
- Authors: David Cook
- First published: 1983

Linked modules
- X1, X2, X3, X4, X5, X6, X7, X8, X9, X10, X11, X12, X13, XL1, XSOLO, XS2

Master of the Desert Nomads is a Dungeons & Dragons adventure module designed by David Cook, for use with the Expert D&D set, and is the first part of a two-part adventure, with Temple of Death being the second part.

The plot events and related characters are described below using in-universe tone.

== Plot summary ==
Master of the Desert Nomads is an adventure scenario in which the player characters follow a river and cross the desert to find an evil abbey. The adventure includes several wilderness encounters.

This scenario opens in a small village on the border of the Republic of Darokin. The party has answered the call to defend the Republic against the recently unified human and humanoid tribes of the vast Sind desert, bordering Darokin to the northeast. Having missed the departure of the main army, they are tasked with seeking out more information on the mysterious figure behind the enemy armies (the titular desert nomads). In the adventure that follows, the adventurers must tackle a series of wilderness encounters, including journeying up a sluggish river to its source, passing through a dismal salt marsh, crossing an inhospitable desert, and searching for a pass through the high and forbidding mountain chain on the far side of the desert. If successful, the adventure ends at an abbey situated on a mountain spur above the alpine meadows, after which the player characters may proceed with the second module in this series, the Temple of Death.

== Publication history ==
X4 Master of the Desert Nomads was written by David Cook, and was published by TSR in 1983 as a 32-page booklet with an outer folder; this module was the first in the Desert Nomads series. The cover was by Harry Quinn, with interior art by Jeff Easley and Keith Parkinson.

== Reception ==
Imagine magazine's Doug Cowie reviewed X4 favorably. Although he felt it featured a "scarcely original plot," the author had "built onto the stereotype with intelligence and imagination". As an example, Cowie noted that the players are hired, not as an elite force, but as part of the army reserve, consisting of "undesirables and unusables". According to Cowie, the module features a hazardous wilderness journey and several dungeon-style encounters. He thought that the designer "has done a good job of creating the atmosphere of a land at war" including encounters with patrols and even an enemy army. Cowie noted that the latter is "the kind of complicated encounter that most designers shy away from but David Cook handles it well." Another large-scale encounter involves 100 bandits and 40-50 caravan guards and, according to Cowie, Cook provides a "perfectly workable system which allows the whole battle to be fought in a reasonable amount of time." Cowie called the final encounter area a "classic corridors-and-rooms setting" with a "fine, threatening atmosphere and some good NPCs." He also praised "a lovely twist in the plot that could put an unwary party into a lot of trouble." The only drawback, Cowie thought, is that to progress to the end the players need to "make the correct deductions and choose the right courses of action at certain stages," so those who prefer completely free player choice should "look elsewhere." Calling it a "good module with some particularly noteworthy sections" he concluded his review by noting: "If you can accept the need for some player guidance and prompting, you will find it a worthwhile and enjoyable experience."

Rick Swan reviewed the adventure in The Space Gamer No. 71. Swan noted, "Not only does 'Master of the Desert Nomads' provide welcome relief from the tedious dungeon exploration all too common in TSR D&D modules, it's a genuine epic in every sense of the word." He complemented the encounters, saying they are "not only exciting in themselves, they also provide alert players clues and insights about the Master and his evil secrets," and that "the DM will have no problem keeping track of the action." He calls the ending "somewhat of a cheat," because the characters never encounter the Master in this adventure, and felt that "the entire module is really just a prologue" to 'Temple of Death' and "it isn't very satisfying just played by itself." He concluded by saying that, "Taken together, the 'Desert Nomad' series is one of the most imaginative and exciting adventures produced by TSR in quite a while."

The French RPG magazine La Gazette du Donjon gave this adventure a top rating of 5 out of 5, saying, "This module is a true masterpiece with an unrivalled desert sword 'n sorcery atmosphere. The backstory is just brilliant. The crossing of the wild lands is very pleasant with various challenges to overcome and lots of different landscapes. Finally, various locations and events keep the suspense intact with original encounters in the southern desert and the cursed abbey. The new and original monsters contribute to the disturbing atmosphere."
