= Drums on Fire Mountain =

Dungeons & Dragons adventure module

- Cover art by Brian Williams.
- Code: X8
- TSR product code: 9127
- Rules required: D&D Expert Set
- Character levels: 5-8
- Campaign setting: Mystara
- Authors: Graeme Morris and Tom Kirby
- First published: 1984

Linked modules
- X1, X2, X3, X4, X5, X6, X7, X8, X9, X10, X11, X12, X13, XL1, XSOLO, XS2

Drums on Fire Mountain is an adventure module published by TSR in 1984 for the Expert Rules of the Dungeons & Dragons fantasy role-playing game. It was the eighth "Expert" adventure to be published.

== Plot summary ==
Drums on Fire Mountain is an adventure scenario taking place on a jungle island, where the player characters explore ancient tunnels located beneath the volcanic mountain.

The waterways located southeast of Thyatis have a reputation for danger, with legends of green-skinned pirates and living fogs. Shipping is the area has recently been disrupted and an expedition was mounted to discover the cause but came back badly damaged and with only a single prisoner.

This scenario occurs southeast from the Thyatian Empire, set on a geographically isolated volcanic island that has no connections to the other nations in the world. The player characters are receive an explanation from the Master of the Seafaring Merchants Guild, and then confront a tribe of green-skinned humanoids who serve a pig Immortal.

== Publication history ==
In the late 1970s, D&D co-creator Gary Gygax met with British game designers Ian Livingstone and Steve Jackson, and granted exclusive rights to their company Games Workshop to distribute TSR products in the United Kingdom. This eventually led to the creation of TSR Hobbies UK Ltd. in 1980, headed by Don Turnbull. In addition to printing their own versions of various D&D and AD&D titles in order to avoid high import costs, the new company also created some original material.

With the release of a Basic and an Expert version of D&D, TSR published Basic (B) modules and Expert (X) modules.The eighth adventure released in the "X" line, X8 Drums on Fire Mountain, was created by TSR Hobbies UK, written by Graeme Morris and Tom Kirby, with cover art by Brian Williams and interior art by Paul Ruiz.

== Reception ==
In Issue 32 of Abyss, Dave Nalle was disappointed in this module, writing, "TSR managed to find people in England who are just as unimaginative as their domestic designers ... Although the setting is superficially new and there are a few original or at least variant monsters, this is just the same old hack and slash stuff."

Writing for the British game magazine Imagine, Wendy J. Rose thought that "DMs will love X8 [and the players] "have plenty of fun on the way". Rose called it "an exciting adventure with lots of interesting little twists and details". On the downside, Rose noted that the opportunities for roleplaying were limited as many encounters are of the 'attack on sight' variety, which could cause the players to miss out on lots of cultural details the module provided. However, Rose felt that "a fair amount of brain as well as brawn" would be needed to really enjoy this module, as its complexities could leave players with only a limited idea of what is going on. Rose finished by saying that the module contained enough material for at least two good gaming sessions and that it was rewarding in terms of loot as well as enjoyment. She called it "worth a try"..

In Issue 70 of the British Game magazine White Dwarf, Graham Staplehurst called it "Another welcome addition to the range of D&D scenarios". Staplehurst felt that the module "has a mainly Polynesian flavour, with a hint of Amerind and African overtones", making the setting "ideal for translation into any on-going campaign". Staplehurst noted that the module "contains a lot of thoughtful detail and plenty of attention has been paid to the society, history and the whole atmosphere of the island. There are many exciting (and even humourous [sic]) encounters and players and DM alike should find the scenario very satisfying." Staplehurst concluded by giving the module a rating of 8 out of 10, saying, "Intelligence has been used in developing the scenario's rationale and balancing it in favour of player skills and enjoyment. Highly recommended."

According to Lawrence Schick, in his 1991 book Heroic Worlds, the scenario "Includes a magic-using devil-swine, so how can you beat it?"
