= Temple of Death =

Dungeons & Dragons adventure module

- Code: X5
- TSR product code: 9069
- Rules required: D&D Expert Set
- Character levels: 6-10
- Campaign setting: Mystara
- Authors: David Cook
- First published: 1983

Linked modules
- X1, X2, X3, X4, X5, X6, X7, X8, X9, X10, X11, X12, X13, XL1, XSOLO, XS2

Temple of Death is a Dungeons & Dragons adventure module designed by David Cook for use with the D&D Expert Set. It was written by David Cook and published by TSR, Inc. in 1983. The module is intended for player characters of levels 6-10.

== Plot summary ==
In the previous adventure Master of the Desert Nomads the tribes of the Sind Desert have joined together under the mysterious being called the Master, and the player characters must eliminate the threat of war against the Republic. In Temple of Death, the characters approach the Black Mountains and traverse the Great Pass through them to reach the land of Hule. Having survived travel through the Great Pass, the characters must pass through the "sanctified land" of Hule. Hule is ruled by the totalitarian Master through strict social orders, and where his stronghold is located. The characters must get to the capital of Hule without being noticed by the Diviners. The characters then need to enter the Dark Wood, to locate the Temple of Death. The scenario presents encounters in wilderness, town, and dungeon settings.

== Publication history ==
Temple of Death was written by David Cook, with art by Tim Truman, and was published by TSR in 1983 as a 32-page booklet with an outer folder. It is the second part of the two-part Desert Nomads series, following Master of the Desert Nomads.

== Reception ==
Dave Morris reviewed Temple of Death for White Dwarf #55, giving the module a rating of 10 out of 10 overall. Morris felt that David Cook "constructed a logical, continually challenging, imaginative and vividly portrayed adventure", and declared, "Frankly, I have not seen a better D&D scenario than this." Morris also praised the artwork by Timothy Truman. Morris felt that this module was "perhaps one of the three or four best role-playing supplements for any system" and gave it a superlative rating, adding, "my only regret is that the adventure was designed for Expert rather than Advanced rules."

Rick Swan reviewed the adventure in The Space Gamer #71, writing that the module: "soars with surprises at every turn", with locales such as "a zombie palace made entirely of fungus, a flying ship manned by skeletons, and a ladder of light that extends to the moon." He also found the maps and illustrations "attractive and functional", and said the views of the Temple would help players visualize the unusual structure. He cautioned that because the adventure is largely set in the wilderness, it will challenge the Dungeon Master to keep the players headed in the right direction. He felt that the Master is "somewhat of a letdown" as he is "a pretty dull guy in light of what's come before". Swan felt that "the two Desert Nomads adventures can't enjoyably be played on their own" but concluded that "Taken with Masters of the Desert Nomads, Temple of Death is great fun".

Steve Hampshire reviewed the scenario for Imagine magazine. He felt it was "well presented" and "thought out carefully", but contained "a few traps for the unwary DM" (e.g. a walled town without any gates shown on the map). Hampshire also thought the pace of the module uneven as the fast pace of the early encounters drops when the player characters go on an overland trek "of no special significance" — whilst the finale "will stretch the abilities of most parties to the limit". In conclusion, Hampshire considered it a "fairly good module", but "not particularly inspired and rather marred" by some errors. He conjectured that the problems might be the result of not enough playtesting.
