= Quagmire! =

Dungeons & Dragons adventure module

- Code: X6
- TSR product code: 9081
- Authors: Merle M. Rasmussen
- First published: 1984

Linked modules
- X1, X2, X3, X4, X5, X6, X7, X8, X9, X10, X11, X12, X13, XL1, XSOLO, XS2

Quagmire! is a 1984 adventure module for the Expert Rules of the Dungeons & Dragons fantasy role-playing game.

== Plot summary ==
Quagmire! is an adventure in which the player characters begin by searching for the city of Quagmire. The characters must travel through a swamp inhabited by monsters to get to the city, which is slowly sinking into the sea. Quagmire is a whelk-shaped city, built like a spiral long ago by a now-dead race in the Serpent Peninsula. The module contains a description of the city.

The player characters find a message in a bottle that the king of Quagmire had sent in desperate need of help to be released from their lizard men oppressors.

== Publication history ==
X6 Quagmire! was written by Merle M. Rasmussen, with cover art by Steve Peregrine, and was published by TSR in 1984 as a 32-page booklet with an outer folder. The module featured interior art by Jeffrey Butler. The scenario was written for the Expert Rules.

== Reception ==
Rick Swan reviewed the adventure in The Space Gamer No. 72. He commented that "Just when you thought adventure modules had exhausted every conceivable variation on dungeon design, along comes Quagmire with its 13-level cities in the shape of gigantic spiral seashells." Swan continued: "Quagmire is perfect for DMs who balk at the thought of having to absorb pages of background information before they can run an adventure. Since all of the preliminary information is contained in a few paragraphs and the plot itself is very simple, a DM could conceivably have his adventurers on the road within a few minutes of his first reading. Most of the module concerns the journey to the spiral cities, a trip that may involve travel across deserts, swamps, and the open sea. Designer Merle Rasmussen has provided dozens of encounters to spice up the journey, neatly addressing a fundamental problem of many wilderness adventures: how to keep the party occupied while they travel long distances. Though it sounds gimmicky, the spiral cities setting is also a nice change of pace from the usual underground dungeons and haunted houses." He added: "Quagmire suffers from one of the most common failings of roleplaying modules, the anticlimactic ending. After hours or days of working through an adventure, players have the right to expect a big finish to make all their trials and tribulations worthwhile. Though the architecture is interesting, there's not much going on in the spiral cities, and rescuing the good guys involved little more than beating up the bad guys. The encounters along the way are generally good ones, but they're also totally unrelated to the purpose of the mission." Swan concluded his review by saying: "Quagmire isn't particularly engaging for either players or DM. The flimsy story line that makes it easy to run also makes it ultimately a drag to play. It should be notes, however, that the extensive wilderness section has a lot of useful ideas and imaginative encounters that could easily be used elsewhere. "Quagmire makes a good supplement, but as a self-contained adventure, it's not much."

Graham Staplehurst reviewed Quagmire! for White Dwarf, and gave it 8/10 overall, calling it "a useful acquisition for any D&D player, particularly as a first excursion into a fully fledged wilderness." Staplehurst praised the module, stating that it "promotes a whole 'experience', a total environment and ecosystem, with background colour and depth which more localised scenarios and modules lack. The designers have done a good job in describing large areas of wild lands, giving inspiration and yet not pedantic detail to DMs with players itching to see a bit of their characters' world and feel it come to life." He called the eponymous city a "superb piece of original design", although he noted that DMs running the scenario "will want to dress up the city a little to add to the scenario as it is a little sparsely populated". Staplehurst concluded the review stating, "The weather, the fatigue of travel, disease, the question of provisions, etc, all play a major part in the characters' concerns, and this increases enjoyment of the game no end. A very good scenario."

In his 1991 book Heroic Worlds, Lawrence Schick provides an alliterative summary of the scenario: "Sea slowly swallows seashell-shaped swamp city".

Games historian Jon Peterson used Quagmire! as the subject of a detailed study of TSR's internal operations during the height of the Dungeons & Dragons fad in the 1980s, showing how staff designers moved projects from concept briefs to story boards and drafts up to publication.
