= Saga of the Shadow Lord =

Adventure module for Dungeons & Dragons

- Code: X11
- TSR product code: 9165
- Authors: Stephen Bourne
- First published: July 1986

Linked modules
- X1, X2, X3, X4, X5, X6, X7, X8, X9, X10, X11, X12, X13, XL1, XSOLO, XS2

Saga of the Shadow Lord is a 1986 adventure module for the Basic Rules of the Dungeons & Dragons fantasy role-playing game.

== Plot summary ==
Saga of the Shadow Lord consists of two linked adventures as a mini-campaign:

In the first adventure called Elvenstar, player characters attempt to steal the magic item that the Shadow Lord is using for his planned invasion against a peaceful neighboring kingdom. Encounters in this adventure include a village populated by adventurers, and a cloud giant living in a small castle, before the party reaches the lair of the Shadow Lord.

In the second adventure, The Halls of Drax Tallen, the Shadow Lord returns with his undead servants looking to find another magic item to give him significantly greater power which the character must find first. An appendix follows this adventure providing statistics for four new magic items, as well as three new monsters.

The player characters will need to survive the undead army gathered by the Shadow Lord to enter his haunted fortress and recover the magical Elvenstar.

== Publication history ==
X11 Saga of the Shadow Lord was published in 1986 as a 64-page booklet with an outer folder. It was written by Stephen Bourne with cover art by Keith Parkinson. The module features interior art by Mark Nelson. The scenario was written for the Expert Rules, for player characters of levels 5–9.

The module comes as a 64-page booklet in a wraparound cover with three sections that includes maps as well as monster and NPC statistics printed on the inside cover. The middle eight pages contain more maps, as well as eight pre-generated player characters.

== Reception ==
Graeme Davis reviewed Saga of the Shadow Lord for White Dwarf #89. He stated that the Elvenstar adventure was designed in an old-fashioned style, with a series of fixed but random-seeming encounters along the way to a dungeon where the serious business takes place. He pointed out that the "village [was] packed with adventurers (of up to 7th level!)" and the "agoraphobic" cloud giant living in the "smallest castle [he's] ever seen", but felt that the "interesting encounter with the Shadow Lord's army lightens the otherwise fairly uninspiring zoo-dungeon journey until the adventurers reach the Shadow Lord's lair for the really serious dungeon-bashing". He noted some good aspects about the final encounter, particularly how the villains' tactics are outlined, as well as notes for the Dungeon Master on what to do next based on whether the PCs win, lose, or even miss the object of their quest. Davis considered The Halls of Drax Tallen repetitive, with the encounters "no more inspired than the first lot", and found "nothing staggeringly inventive or exciting" about the new magic items and monsters. Overall, Davis was disappointed by the module, as it gave him "the impression that no developments had taken place in the hobby in the last few years", with its "simple plot, lots of encounters and plenty of action, all firmly rooted in the original tradition of the game". Still, he conceded that "it does what it sets out to do perfectly adequately, and if an action-packed blood-and-thunder adventure without too much emphasis on plot and justification is your kind of thing, Saga of the Shadow Lords is worth looking at".
