= Castle Amber (module) =

Role-playing game adventure

- Cover depicts the colossus of Ylourgne attacking the city of Vyones Cover art by Erol Otus
- Code: X2
- TSR product code: 9051
- Rules required: D&D Expert Set
- Character levels: 3-6
- Campaign setting: Mystara
- Authors: Tom Moldvay
- First published: 1981

Linked modules
- X1, X2, X3, X4, X5, X6, X7, X8, X9, X10, X11, X12, X13, XL1, XSOLO, XS2

Castle Amber is a Dungeons & Dragons adventure module designed by Tom Moldvay. This was the second module designed for use with the Expert D&D set. The module is in part an adaptation of Clark Ashton Smith's Averoigne stories, and set in the fictional medieval French province of that name.

In Castle Amber, player characters explore the haunted mansion of the Amber family and encounter new monsters. They are drawn into a cursed castle surrounded by a deadly mist and must navigate the demented and often hostile inhabitants to find a hidden portal to the world of Averoigne. Breaking the curse requires finding the inter-dimensional tomb of Stephen Amber. The module is inspired by the Averoigne stories of Clark Ashton Smith, Edgar Allan Poe's works, and Roger Zelazny's The Chronicles of Amber series. Castle Amber was first published in 1981 and was ranked the 15th greatest Dungeons & Dragons adventure by Dungeon magazine in 2004.

== Plot summary ==
The player characters explore the haunted mansion of the Amber family, and encounter new monsters such as the brain collector. The module is an adventure scenario set in a castle surrounded by an unusual gray mist.

During their night's rest on their way to Glantri, the player characters are unexpectedly drawn into a large castle surrounded by an impenetrable, deadly mist. This is the result of a curse the wizard-noble Stephen Amber (Etienne d'Amberville) put on his treacherous relatives for murdering him.

The only way to escape Castle Amber (or Château d'Amberville) is to explore the castle, putting up with the demented, and at times insane, members of the d'Amberville family and the other, often hostile, denizens, and open a hidden portal to the wilderness of the world of Averoigne, where the party can find the means to reach the inter-dimensional tomb in which Stephen Amber rests, in order to break the curse and return home.

In this world, magic is frowned upon, and spellcasters may come to the attention of the Inquisition.

== Inspirations ==
The module's credits give special thanks to Clark Ashton Smith and Casiana Literary Enterprises, Inc., "for use of the Averoigne stories as inspirational material." Castle Amber (Château d'Amberville) draws from the Averoigne stories of Clark Ashton Smith. The main non-player characters of the module, the Amber family (d'Amberville in French, as an option), are not actually in any of Smith's stories, and were created by the designer to provide a link to Averoigne. A selected bibliography is included at the rear of the module.

In addition to the Averoigne references, there are individual encounters within the module that have allusions to stories written by others.

One of the encounters in the module is an homage to (or copy of) the climax of Edgar Allan Poe's short story Fall of the House of Usher, involving a brother who can hear his dead sister, named Madeline in both cases, crying out from the grave where she was buried alive. The overall module has "a decidedly Edgar Allan Poe feel to it." Another encounter calls to mind the title character and gruesome climax of Poe's Hop-Frog.

Many of the creatures also had a "Lovecraftian" feel to them.

The module also is inspired by Roger Zelazny's The Chronicles of Amber series. One character in the first series of rooms is clearly a representation of 'Caine' Amber from the books. The Gray Mist/curse mirrors main character 'Corwin' Amber's curse he utters after his torture and imprisonment by his family, and the room 'The Hall of Mirrors' from the module is inspired by an identical room from the Zelazny book series. Zelazny was aware of these similarities, and on March 15, 1982 he wrote a letter saying he "...satisfied myself that there is nothing actionable there. Ditto on TSR's D&D game, Amber Castle (sic)."

== Publication history ==
Castle Amber was the second module designed for use with the D&D Expert Set. It was written by Tom Moldvay and published 1981 as a 32-page booklet with an outer folder and a cover designed by Erol Otus.

The module was developed by Dave Cook, Allen Hammack, Kevin Hendryx, Harold Johnson, Tom Moldvay, and Jon Pickens, and edited by Harold Johnson, Edward Sollers, and Steve Winter. It features art by Jim Holloway, Harry Quinn, Jim Roslof, Stephen D. Sullivan, and Erol Otus.

Mark of Amber was a sequel/remake of the original Castle Amber. It was reprinted in 1995 in the form of a boxed set, complete with an audio CD, map posters, and player handouts. It was part of the short lived Masters series. The Castle was renamed Château Sylaire.

== Reception ==
In Issue 35 of White Dwarf magazine, Jim Bambra was not overly impressed by this adventure, commenting that it was "an attempt to bring randomness back into D&D." Bambra considered the random element somewhat chaotic and did not recommend this adventure for purchase, noting that it "depends a lot on chance, leaving little room for skill, and at times can be deadly." Bambra concluded by giving Castle Amber a rating of 6 out of 10.

To commemorate the 30th anniversary of the Dungeons & Dragons game, Erik Mona and James Jacobs chose their Top Thirty Greatest Dungeons & Dragons adventures of all time, and ranked Castle Amber in 15th place.

In a review of Castle Amber in Black Gate, Jeffrey Talanian said "Castle Amber is rich with flavor, tragic history, and weird happenings. This is not your typical fantasy adventure. Members of the Amber family itself lurk around every corner — some insane, some deadly! This module holds up, I feel, and it's a classic for a reason. Truly, Moldvay shines in this one, expressing his creativity in unique fashion."

The French RPG magazine La Gazette du Donjon gave this adventure a rating of only 1 out of 5, calling it, "The worst module in the X series. The concept could have been interesting but the adventure is completely surreal. It may be intentional, but it's a complete failure. In addition, the module is full of typos, and some boxes of read-aloud text are missing. Just one thing was great: the Ambers. Deliciously depraved, crazy, traitors and manipulators. This scenario, with them as a basis, could have been a masterpiece."
