= The Revenge of Rusak =

Tabletop role-playing game supplement for Dungeons & Dragons

- The cover of The Revenge of Rusak (Accessory AC8) shows 3-D Dragon Tiles (cardstock fold-up characters, monsters, and surroundings including wilderness and a tent encampment).
- Code: AC8
- TSR product code: 9145
- Rules required: Dungeons & Dragons Expert Set or Basic Set
- Character levels: 6 - 8
- Campaign setting: Generic
- Authors: David "Zeb" Cook
- First published: 1985

Linked modules
- AC1, AC2, AC3, AC4, AC5, AC6, AC7, AC8, AC9, AC10, AC11, AC1010, AC1011

Dragon Tiles featuring The Revenge of Rusak is a short accessory designed for the Dungeons & Dragons role-playing game.

== Contents ==
A sequel to The Kidnapping of Princess Arelina's accessory, it features Dragon Tiles, which are cardboard cutouts which can be arranged in different ways to make a variety of dungeon maps. In addition cardboard figurine cutouts which can be used in a manner similar to miniatures, and a short adventure designed to use the pieces that come with the supplement, are included.

=== Dragon Tiles ===
The cardstock cutouts that come with this module are wilderness tiles, and the set also comes with cardstock character miniatures. They depict a small tent encampment, a wilderness area with a large lake, figures for the characters used in the adventure, and a tunnel.

Many of the cutouts include instructions for folding them into three dimensional shapes to add depth to the game board.

=== The Revenge of Rusak ===
This miniscenario is a sequel to The Kidnapping of Princess Arelina.

==== Pre-generated Characters ====
The adventure uses the same characters presented in The Kidnapping of Princess Arelina with some modifications for using the Expert rules and level advancement over time. It is designed for four to six adventurers of 6th to 8th level of experience.

=== Plot summary ===
The Revenge of Rusak is a direct sequel to the events depicted in the Kidnapping scenario from the previous set of Dragon Tiles.

The former warden of the land, Ernst Zieglar, killed the king, raised Rusak, and usurped the kingdom. The group runs across the fleeing former princess and thus comes into the adventure. They attempt to guide her to a meeting of loyalist in the hopes of taking back the kingdom.

Rusak interferes at every step and eventually the group chases the wizard back to his hideout in the hills where a final confrontation takes place.

==== Enemies ====
- Fungoid
- Rusak (Illusionist)

== Publication history ==
AC5 Dragon Tiles II: The Revenge of Rusak was designed by David "Zeb" Cook, with art by Dennis and Martha Kauth, and was published by TSR in 1985 as an 8-page pamphlet, two cardstock sheets, a cardstock counters sheet, and an outer folder. It was originally misprinted with the designation AC3; AC5 stickers were then placed over the misprint. Both were in error, as AC5 was the designation for the 1984 printing of the Player Character Record Sheets. Though the printing was never corrected, later publications gave it the designation of AC8.
