= Top Secret Companion =

1985 espionage role-playing game supplement

- Designers: Merle Rasmussen
- Publishers: TSR
- Publication: 1985
- Genres: Espionage

Top Secret Companion is a supplement published by TSR in 1985 for the modern-day espionage role-playing game Top Secret that moved the game towards a more action-oriented focus.

== Contents ==
Top Secret Companion is a supplement in which new rules are introduced, including guidelines for outlining backgrounds for agents, details on the organization known as "The Bureau," rules and costs regarding traveling, new rules for combat, new weapons and equipment, and an adventure scenario titled "Operation: MELTDOWN".

== Publication history ==
Although TSR was well known for their fantasy role-playing game Dungeons & Dragons, in 1980 TSR moved into the modern-day espionage genre with the publication of Top Secret. However, there were complaints that the game lack verve. As critic J.R. Zambrano noted, "The skill-based system [of Top Secret] was lacking after the initial release. Which led Rasmussen and TSR to develop an expansion, the Top Secret Companion. The Companion added back in character classes and new abilities and streamlined the combat while adding new weapons. All of which was to say that the game went from being a little more George Smiley to being a little more James Bond. Which was exactly what the audiences wanted." Top Secret Companion was written by Merle M. Rasmussen and published by TSR in 1985 as a 96-page book.

== Reception ==
In Issue 37 of Abyss, Jon Schuller was not impressed by the production values, noting the "rather unattractive glossy cover and rather shoddy printing and graphics on the cheap-paper interior." Schuller found the contents "a mixed bag"; he liked the new Areas of Knowledge, the new bureaus and divisions, and the courses offered at 'Espionage College'; but he felt the section on developing new missions had some "really bad" ideas. Schuller found the included adventure "presents a rather predictable scenario about KGB interference with a US/European space project." Despite these issues, Schuller recommended this book "because it does have a lot of useful information, and if you can stomach the problems with Top Secret or are still playing at this level, the background and data will be quite useful to you. For those interested in espionage aids in general, there are far better systems and more advanced aids which might be more useful."
