= The War Rafts of Kron =

Dungeons & Dragons adventure module

War Rafts of Kron
- Code: X7
- TSR product code: 9079
- Rules required: Dungeons & Dragons
- Character levels: 9 - 12
- Campaign setting: X
- Authors: Bruce Nesmith
- First published: 1984

Linked modules
- X1, X2, X3, X4, X5, X6, X7, X8, X9, X10, X11, X12, X13, XL1, XSOLO, XS2

The War Rafts of Kron (ISBN 0-88038-114-0) is a 1984 adventure module for the Dungeons & Dragons roleplaying game.

== Synopsis ==
The War Rafts of Kron is an adventure scenario that takes place on the sea and below its surface. The module includes rules for playing underwater and details both the "war rafts" and the underwater city of Colhador.

The module's introductory section includes rules for underwater events and encounters. The next section introduces the adventure and informs the player characters that for completing the adventure they will be awarded their own tropical island, but also warns that many have tried and failed. The player characters must discover the guilty party that has been raiding vessels on the High Seas, disrupting shipping and capturing a local princess. They will travel deep into the monster infested Sea of Dread.

The sea-bound Minrothad Guilds hire the player characters for a delicate task. For months the sea trade routes have been raided by pirates, but their latest success stirs great political unrest, for the princess of Ierendi has disappeared during her voyage on one of the Guild's ships. The player characters set out to the open sea, only to fall prey to the pirates. With the aid of a storm giant, they must discover the plot behind these raids. Set both on the floating sea city of Kron and an undersea city inhabited by tritons, it involves an ancient evil in the sunken city of Colhador.

== Publication history ==
The War Rafts of Kron was written by Bruce Nesmith, with a cover by Larry Elmore and interior illustrations by Jeff Butler. It was published by TSR in 1984 as a 32-page booklet with an outer folder.

The associated code for The War Rafts of Kron is X7 and its TSR product code is TSR 9079. This module was developed and intended for use with Dungeons & Dragon's Expert Set rules.

=== Credits ===
The production team consisted of six individuals:

- Bruce Nesmith, Design
- Anne Gray, Editing
- Ruth Hoyer, Graphic design
- Larry Elmore, Cover artist
- Jeff Butler, Interior artist
- David S. "Diesel" LaForce, Cartographer

== Reception ==
Graham Staplehurst reviewed The War Rafts of Kron for White Dwarf #70, and gave it 8/10 overall, noting that the module is a "departure from the normal idea of adventuring" as it takes the characters underwater. Staplehurst felt that the designers made "Good use of imagination and fantasy", which provides "unusual and exciting play situations to last a number of sessions". Staplehurst concluded the review stating, "There is also a carefully worked out background which allows characters to move freely between encounters and work things out for themselves rather than be channelled from one to another in series. Overall, this is a worthwhile contribution to the D&D stable."
