= The Shady Dragon Inn =

Tabletop role-playing game supplement for Dungeons & Dragons

- The cover of The Shady Dragon Inn (Accessory AC1) shows a group of adventurers gathered around a candlelit table (art by Larry Day).
- Code: AC1
- TSR product code: 9100
- Rules required: Dungeons & Dragons Basic or Expert Set
- Authors: Carl Smith
- First published: 1983

Linked modules
- AC1, AC2, AC3, AC4, AC5, AC6, AC7, AC8, AC9, AC10, AC11, AC1010, AC1011

The Shady Dragon Inn is an accessory designed for the Basic Set or Expert Set of the Dungeons & Dragons role-playing game. It was published by TSR, Inc. in 1983. Written by Carl Smith, The Shady Dragon Inn is a supplement used to help dungeon masters introduce fully designed characters into any scenario.

== Contents ==
The Shady Dragon Inn is a supplement containing 118 pregenerated characters, appearing singly and in parties. The book includes a six-page floor plan of the Shady Dragon Inn, scaled at 25 mm. The book describes groups of non-player characters including fighters, magic-users, clerics, and thieves, as well as characters from various races and special characters, and parties of them all. This part of the book takes up the first 26 pages.

The purpose of the supplement is to provide the dungeon master with either non-player characters to fill out a campaign or already generated characters for gamers to choose amongst to play in their own right.

=== Classes ===
==== Fighters ====
The book features twenty-three different fighters, ranging from Abel Artone to Vychan the Little. Each character includes a statistic block, a brief description of their equipment, a physical description, and a very brief biography.

==== Magic Users ====
Eighteen different Magic Users grace the pages of this accessory, from Apris the Wondrous to Zarkon the Blue. Like the fighters, each includes statistic blocks and descriptions with the addition of the wizard's spell selection.

==== Clerics ====
Seventeen clerics grace the pages of this manual including everything from Ambrose the Celt to Penelope of West Haven. Like the wizards, the cleric description includes known spells along with a description and general possessions.

==== Thieves ====
This class of character maintained the title of thief until later renamed "rogue" in the third edition of Dungeons & Dragons. The supplement details fourteen of the thieves from Aiden Ablefingers to Zacharias the Nimble.

=== Races ===
==== Dwarves ====
Ten dwarves find their way into the manual from Astrid Helmsplitter to Ulf the Sledge. As with the others a statistic block and brief description comes with each of the characters.

==== Elves ====
An even dozen elves including Aithne of Far Isle to Torquil of Deep Hollow occupy this section of the book. As in the original Dungeons and Dragons system, all of the elves are magic-users and their spell books come with their descriptions.

==== Halflings ====
Begol Burrowell is the first of ten Halflings described in the tome and Wat Watershed is the last. Information about their background is included with a statistic block.

=== Others ===
==== Special characters ====
The thirteen characters presented in this section are drawn from the Dungeons & Dragons toy line that was marketed around this time. Each character features a more detailed, though still concise, description block and statistic area. The section begins with Mercion the cleric and concludes with Warduke, an evil fighter. Also included were Kelek the dark wizard and Northlord the barbarian.

=== The Shady Dragon Inn ===
The inn itself is described near the end of the supplement, along with the people found there on a daily basis. This section also includes prices for the various services provided by the Shady Dragon.

In 1983, a follow-up article written by product author Carl Smith for Polyhedron Newszine provided additional details about the employees and furnishings of the Shady Dragon Inn (Smith 1983).

==== Parties ====
The final section of the book details various groups of adventurers, or parties, who might be staying at the inn at any particular time.

== Publication history ==
AC1 Shady Dragon Inn was written by Carl Smith, with a cover by Larry Day and interior illustrations by Jim Holloway. It was published by TSR in 1983 as a 32-page booklet enclosed in an outer folder. The inner side of the folder features a 20" by 17" map of the Shady Dragon Inn, showing both the ground and top floors, with a scale of 1 inch = 5 feet.

== Reception ==
Doug Cowie reviewed AC1 for Imagine magazine, giving it a positive review. He described the accessory as "very welcome", he nevertheless faulted the character sketches for their lack of information on treasure and other items carried. Cowie also noted that the section on parties was "a waste of space" as it repeated information already provided elsewhere in the book. However, he called the part of the accessory dedicated to the Inn "good stuff". He ended his review by noting that while AC1 is not a must-have, the inclusion of the inn—"an acceptable adventurer's base"—raises it above-average and makes it "worth considering".
