= The Book of Wondrous Inventions =

Tabletop role-playing game supplement for Dungeons & Dragons

- The Book of Wondrous Inventions Module Cover.
- Code: AC11
- TSR product code: 9220
- Rules required: Dungeons & Dragons Basic, Expert, Companion and Master Sets
- Campaign setting: Generic
- Authors: compiled by Bruce A. Heard
- First published: 1987

Linked modules
- AC1, AC2, AC3, AC4, AC5, AC6, AC7, AC8, AC9, AC10, AC11, AC1010, AC1011

The Book of Wondrous Inventions is an accessory for the Dungeons & Dragons fantasy role-playing game.

== Contents ==
The Book of Wondrous Inventions is supplement which details humorous magical devices for Dungeons & Dragons and Advanced Dungeons & Dragons.

== Publication history ==
AC11 The Book of Wondrous Inventions was compiled by Bruce A. Heard, with art by Jim Holloway, and was published by TSR in 1987 as a 96-page book.

== Reception ==
Jim Bambra reviewed The Book of Wondrous Inventions for Dragon magazine #136 (August 1988). Bambra described The Book of Wondrous Inventions as "a real treat for lovers of wacky magical items," including such "zany labor-saving devices and weird war machines" as Melrond's Foolproof Dishwasher and Brandon's Bard-in-a-Box". He also noted that the book contains plenty of "devices of mass destruction", as well as rules for creating magical items.

Lawrence Schick, in his 1991 book Heroic Worlds, comments on some items in the book such as "magic boom boxes" and "armored tanks": "Pretty funny, eh? Real knee-slappers."
