= Top Secret (role-playing game) =

Spy fiction tabletop role-playing game supplement

An espionage role playing game
- first edition rule book cover
- Designers: Merle M. Rasmussen (1st edition); Douglas Niles (Top Secret/S.I.)
- Publishers: TSR, Inc.
- Publication: 1980 (1st edition); 1981 (2nd edition); 1987 Top Secret/S.I.
- Genres: Spy fiction
- Systems: Custom percentile
- ISBN: 978-0935696165

Top Secret is an espionage-themed tabletop role-playing game written by Merle M. Rasmussen and first published in 1980 by TSR, Inc.

== Top Secret (original edition) ==
Original edition logo

The first edition of Top Secret was designed by Merle M. Rasmussen, and allows players and gamemasters to build their own espionage story settings. The original boxed set of the game included a 64-page rule book and a sample adventure, "Operation: Sprechenhaltestelle". The TSR Product Code for the original boxed set is TSR-7006. The game was developed over a period of two years by Rasmussen and TSR editor Allen Hammack. As part of the playtesting for the game, a note about an imaginary assassination plot written on TSR stationery caused the FBI to come to investigate the offices of TSR Hobbies.

The Top Secret game is based exclusively on 10-sided dice. All character attributes and other statistics are percentiles; some scores are rolled, and some are derived from combinations of two or more other scores. Top Secret also features Areas of Knowledge, which function similarly to skills in more modern RPGs. Characters gain experience points and progress upward in level. The levels had relatively limited in-game effects (most significantly, gained experience points were divided by the character's level but the base mission pay was multiplied by the character's level). Characters could also improve statistics by spending experience points. Top Secret also featured Fame and Fortune points. These were the first game mechanics that players could use to alter game results, a concept that continues in many "storytelling" roleplaying games, such as Fate.

Top Secret characters are employed in specific bureaus—Assassination (Killing), Confiscation (Theft), or Investigation (Research)—all in the structure of an unspecified espionage agency. Despite a character's primary vocation, he may be called on to perform any type of mission. The in-game effect of a character's bureau was a 100-point experience bonus for mission objectives which fall within that bureau as well as bonus mission pay for those actions specific to the chosen bureau. An appendix in the rule book lists dozens of historical and fictional espionage organizations which could serve as employers or adversaries for missions.

An expansion to the game, The Top Secret Companion, introduced enhancements to many game components. It included additional character classes and missions, as well as new Areas of Knowledge and abilities. A revised combat system was introduced that sped up and provided more variety to combat results. New equipment and weapons were introduced as well.

== Reception ==
In Issue 29 of Space Gamer, Jerry Epperson reviewed Top Secret and commented "I liked the game, despite its faults. The system is new enough that the situations will not become blase (as with other role-playing games) for months or years. And it would be a sound investment for any fans of the James Bond, Executioner, or Avenger stories. Others would be wise to stick with fantasy, if they cannot associate with the heroes of the present."

In Issue 67 of The Space Gamer, W.G. Armintrout compared Top Secret to rival spy role-playing games Espionage!, and Mercenaries, Spies and Private Eyes and commented "Top Secret is a good game, though I think both of the newer games slightly eclipse it. It has the best combat system of the three — being neither too simple nor too complicated — and the widest variety of 'fun' devices. Adventures are readily available for it. On the other hand, Top Secret is pretty lame when it comes to non-combat situations. If I were TSR, I'd be thinking about a new edition of the game to stay competitive."

In his 1990 book The Complete Guide to Role-Playing Games, game critic Rick Swan called Top Secret "The first espionage RPG of any consequence" and thought the game "holds up amazingly well even a decade after its release." Swan admitted that most of the character generation system had been borrowed from Advanced Dungeons & Dragons, but thought this was overshadowed by the "gadgets galore" as well as "a first-rate combat system." Swan concluded by giving Top Secret a solid rating of 3 out of 4.

=== Supplements ===
==== Information supplements ====
- Top Secret Administrator's Screen and Mini-Module. Corey Koebernick (1982). (Includes Operation: Executive One) ISBN 0-935696-79-2 (The agents must rescue the president, who is being held by a band of Canadian mercenaries in a haunted mansion).
- Agent Dossiers (1983) ISBN 0880380705 (Character sheet pack).
- TS007 – Top Secret Companion. Merle Rasmussen (1985). ISBN 0-88038-102-7 (Expanded rules and new equipment).

==== Mission modules ====
- TS001 – Operation: Sprechenhaltestelle. Merle Rasmussen (1980). ISBN 0-935696-17-2, this module details a town on the border between East and West [the exact location is never specified] where secrets and subterfuge are everywhere).
- TS002 – Operation: Rapidstrike!. Mike Carr (1982). ISBN 0-935696-57-1 (This module details a commando raid on an enemy complex to recover a kidnapped scientist).
- TS003 – Lady in Distress. Mike Carr (1982). (This module's plot involved agents parasailing to rescue a hijacked cruise ship. The module's ship plans were based on the MS Achille Lauro, which was seized by PLO terrorists in 1985 and resulted in the murder of one passenger.)
- TS004 – Operation: Fastpass. Philip Taterczynski (1983). ISBN 0-88038-011-X (This module details a defection at an international puzzle tournament being held behind the Iron Curtain).
- TS005 – Operation: Orient Express. David Cook. ISBN 0-88038-041-1 (This module contains a series of 6 adventures set on trains in Europe and rules for creating similar adventures).
- TS006 – Operation: Ace of Clubs. Merle Rasmussen (1984). ISBN 0-394-53464-6 (The agents investigate events at The Ace of Clubs, an exclusive resort and casino operated as a front by The Agency).
- TS008 – Operation: Seventh Seal. Evan Robinson (1985). ISBN 0-88038-134-5 (The agents have to deal with a nuclear threat by an organization that uses Tarot Cards as code names).

==== Modules published in Dragon magazine ====
- "The Missile Mission", Dragon no. 39. Mike Carr.
- "Doctor Yes: The Floating Island Mission", Dragon no. 48 (April 1981). Merle Rasmussen, James Thompson.
- "Mad Merc: The Alulu Island Mission", Dragon no. 56. Merle Rasmussen, James Thompson (1981).
- "Chinatown: The Jaded Temple", Dragon no. 62. Jerry Epperson (1982).
- "Wacko World", Dragon no. 79. Al Taylor. (The agents must investigate a theme park).
- "Whiteout", Dragon no. 87. Merle Rasmussen (1984). (Suspicious incidents at an Antarctic research station require the agents to go undercover to investigate).

==== Modules published in Gygax magazine ====
- "Operation Rendezvous Oasis", Gygax no. 4. Merle Rasmussen (2014).

== Top Secret/S.I. edition ==
Cover of Top Secret/SI

In 1987, TSR published Top Secret/S.I. ("Special Intelligence"), a revised edition designed by Douglas Niles. The TSR Product Code for the revised boxed set is TSR-7620. S.I. introduced a more structured gaming environment in which players worked as agents for secret intelligence agency ORION against its evil adversary, WEB. Later source books in the product line introduce both supernatural (Agent 13) and futuristic (F.R.E.E.Lancers) adventure settings. These settings introduced several recurring characters such as Sebastian Cord and Agent 13.

TSR stopped producing Top Secret/SI material in 1992.

=== Combat system ===
Top Secret/S.I. uses a fast, simple, unified combat system based upon a percentage roll.

The original Top Secret uses separate systems for Hand-to-Hand Combat (rock-paper-scissors) and Projectile Combat (two, ten-sided dice).

Combat is divided into 5-second rounds. If necessary, rounds are subdivided into 1 second "phases." In each round, Weapon Possession and then Hand-to-Hand Combat are resolved first. In each phase, character movement follows Projectile Combat. Characters may move up to 15’ per phase. Weapon firing order is determined by each weapon's speed and five categories of twenty eight condition modifiers (Drawing, Shooter's Movement, Wounds, Aiming, and, for the initial round, Surprise Factor).

For Projectile Combat, a character's stats, skills, bonuses and penalties; their projectile weapon's properties; and the current combat conditions give the character a percentage chance of hitting a target. For each projectile fired, the shooting player rolls two ten-sided dice to give a number from one to one hundred (the first die result indicates the "tens," the second the "ones"). A result equal to or lower than the chance of hitting the target succeeds. The shooting player then rolls additional two ten-sided dice for each success to determine the target hit location. Finally, the shooting player rolls two ten-sided dice to determine damage for each success. With a damage roll, the first die indicates the type of wound (from "abrasion" to "internal damage") and the second indicates the seriousness of the wound (modified by the type of wound, resulting in one to twelve points of damage to the target's general hit points).

For Hand-to-Hand Combat, each combatant in each round chooses from seven combat types (weapon Possession, Untrained, Knife Fighting, Boxing, Sword Play, Judo, and Martial Arts). Each combat type allows the player to choose from a total of up to three attacks and defenses (combined). A combatant may only choose a combat type allowed by their Physical Education or Military Science Knowledge Level. Each combatant secretly chooses their attack(s) and defense(s) from their preferred combat type for that round. The combatants then simultaneously reveal their choices. The gamemaster interprets the combatants' attack and defense choices, looks up the result on the attack combat types' tables, and modifies the result by any object used as a hand-to-hand weapon (e.g., purse, boot, tape recorder, bolt cutter). On the martial arts table alone, there are twenty eight attack choices and fifteen defense choices.

=== Character sheets ===
Character sheets in Top Secret/S.I. resemble agent dossiers, and are intended to provide quick and easy reference to all a player's stats and skills. They also provide a detailed map of the ten possible hit spots of a character's body, and a blank portrait area for drawing or attaching a depiction of the character.

== Reception ==
Thomas M. Kane reviewed Top Secret/S.I. in White Wolf No. 9 (1988), rating it a 7 out of 10 (8 if there were no original Top Secret) and stated that "The Top Secret/S.I. game would be marvelous for anyone new to modern era role-playing and Top Secret veterans should also consider it, though not at the cost of ruining an established campaign. The game's few flaws can be corrected by an astute GM."

In The Complete Guide to Role-Playing Games, Rick Swan reviewed Top Secret/S.I. and liked it even more than its predecessor, calling it "not only an improvement in every respect, it's also the best espionage RPG on the market, a masterful integration of elegant mechanics, evocative atmosphere, and sleek graphics." Swan concluded by giving Top Secret/S.I. a top grade of 4 out of 4, saying, "Beautifully packaged, meticulously organized, and thoroughly entertaining, Top Secret/S.I is a near-flawless balance of playability and realism. This is secret-agent role-playing at its streamlined best."

In a 1996 reader survey conducted by British games magazine Arcane to determine the top 50 role-playing games, Top Secret/S.I. was ranked 38th. Editor Paul Pettengale commented: "Top Secret is inspired more by The Man From U.N.C.L.E. and the lighter James Bond movies than real life. Players belong to an organisation of 'good guys' pitted against the 'bad guys' — a thinly veiled analogy of the Eastern Bloc. Gadgets and manners are more important than combat skills, and there are rarely nasty deaths."

=== Supplements ===
==== Box sets ====
- Top Secret/S.I.. Douglas Niles, Warren Spector (1987). ISBN 0-88038-407-7
- High Stakes Gamble. Douglas Niles, Bob Kern (1988). ISBN 0-88038-545-6

==== Accessory books ====
G4 File: Cover art by Ron Bradford

- TSAC1 – G4 File: Guns, Gadgets & Getaway Gear. Merle Rasmussen (1987). ISBN 0-88038-474-3
- TSAC2 – Agent 13 Source Book. Mark Acres (1988). ISBN 0-88038-478-6
- TSAC3 – Covert Operations Sourcebook. John Prados (1988). ISBN 0-88038-479-4
- TSAC4 – F.R.E.E. Lancers. Jeff Grubb (1988). ISBN 0-88038-565-0
- TSAC5 – Commando. David Cook (1988). ISBN 0-88038-594-4
- TSAC6 – Covert Operations Sourcebook Vol. 2. John Prados (1988). ISBN 0-88038-616-9
- TSAC7 – F.R.E.E. America. Scott Bowles (1989). ISBN 0-88038-725-4

==== Mission modules ====
- TS1 – Operation: Starfire. Tracy Hickman (1987). ISBN 0-88038-476-X
- TS2 – The Doomsday Drop. Tracy Hickman (1988). ISBN 0-88038-480-8
- TS3 – Orion Rising. (1988). ISBN 0-88038-575-8
- TS4 – Commando Brushfire Wars. ISBN 0-88038-708-4
- TSA1 – The Web. Caroline Spector (1990). ISBN 0-88038-820-X
- TSA2 – The Final Weapon. Ray Winninger (1990). ISBN 0-88038-855-2
- TSE1 – Web of Deceit. Bob Kern (1989). ISBN 0-88038-714-9
- TSE2 – Sting of the Spider. Bob Kern (1989). ISBN 0-88038-732-7
- TSE3 – Web Wars. Bob Kern (1989). ISBN 0-88038-765-3

==== Modules published in Dungeon magazine ====
- "Operation: Fire Sale", Dungeon no. 26. John Terra.

==== Solo Operations Casebooks ====
The Final Bug: Cover art by Joseph Chiodo

- The Final Bug. Jean Blashfield (1988). ISBN 0-88038-553-7
- Foul Play at Fool's Summit. Troy Denning (1989). ISBN 0-88038-621-5 (Note: though this module has an ISBN, it was never actually released, as the Catacombs gamebook line was cancelled before its release.)

=== Novels ===
Five novels were published by TSR from various campaign settings from Top Secret/S.I. game.

- Agent 13: The Midnight Avenger #1: The Invisible Empire by Flint Dille and David Marconi. ISBN 0-88038-281-3
- Agent 13: The Midnight Avenger #2: The Serpentine Assassin Flint Dille and David Marconi. ISBN 0-88038-282-1
- Double Agent: Acolytes of Darkness/Web of Danger by Flint Dille and David Marconi/Aaron Allston ISBN 0-88038-550-2
- Double Agent: Royal Pain/The Hollow Earth Affair by Richard Merwin/Warren Spector ISBN 0-88038-551-0
- Double Agent: The Hard Sell/Glitch! by Richard Merwin/David Cook ISBN 0-88038-589-8
- F.R.E.E.Lancers by Mel Odom ISBN 0-7869-0113-6
- F.R.E.E.Fall by Mel Odom ISBN 0-7869-0493-3

=== Comics ===
Two graphic novels based on the Pulp era setting were published.

- Agent 13: The Midnight Avenger by Flint Dille, David Marconi, and Dan Spiegle ISBN 0-88038-581-2
- Agent 13: Acolytes of Darkness (loosely based on the novel)

==== Agent 13 ====
TSR published eight issues of 13: Assassin comic that featured stories set in the Agent 13 campaign setting bringing the story to a more modern era (1990s). The first six issues had a back-up story set in the Top Secret/S.I. setting (ORION vs. WEB) which seemed to take place at the end of the agency's covert war. Each issue also contained a miniature game and some issues included character stats for the role-playing game.

==== Warhawks ====
Warhawks was a four issue comic/module series that took the Top Secret/S.I. game to a time traveling setting where characters derive powers from tattoos. The four issues featured character stats and served as a campaign book in addition to the comic book adventures.

== Top Secret: New World Order ==
In June 2017, Merle Rasmussen announced the release of a reboot entitled Top Secret: New World Order, a completely new iteration in the series. He had been running the game at conventions and events for two years prior to the release, adjusting the rules and user experience in real-time. The game has an updated rules system to appeal to more modern role-playing gamers.

The Kickstarter page for Top Secret: New World Order went live on June 27, 2017. The game began shipping to backers in March 2018.
