= Top Secret Administrator's Screen and Mini-Module =

Tabletop role-playing game supplement

Top Secret Administrator's Screen and Mini-Module is a 1982 role-playing game supplement for Top Secret published by TSR.

== Contents ==
Top Secret Administrator's Screen and Mini-Module is a referee screen that reprints the most frequently-used game charts on two of its sides, and comes with the mini-module Operation: Executive One.

Administrator's Screen and Mini-Module is a gamemaster's screen which includes a short adventure intended for one or two players involving the hideout used by an international criminal.

== Publication history ==
Administrator's Screen and Mini-Module was designed by Corey Koebernick, and was published by TSR in 1982 as a cardstock screen with an 8-page pamphlet.

== Reception ==
William A. Barton reviewed Top Secret Administrator's Screen and Mini-Module in The Space Gamer No. 54. Barton commented that "Overall [...] this should prove to be a useful play-aid for Top Secret fans."
