= Quest for the Heartstone =

Dungeons & Dragons adventure module

- Code: XL1
- TSR product code: 9114
- Authors: Michael L. Gray
- First published: 1984

Linked modules
- X1, X2, X3, X4, X5, X6, X7, X8, X9, X10, X11, X12, X13, XL1, XSOLO, XS2

Quest for the Heartstone is a 1984 adventure module for the Basic Rules of the Dungeons & Dragons fantasy role-playing game. The module was a tie-in with the LJN toy line introduced the previous year. Reviews of the module described it as a poorly written marketing gimmick.

== Plot summary ==
Quest for the Heartstone is an adventure scenario set in wilderness and dungeon locations, and details a frost giant lair, with four pages of illustrations that can be shown to the players.

== Publication history ==
XL1 Quest for the Heartstone was published by TSR in 1984 as a 32-page booklet with an outer folder, and was written by Michael L. Gray, with art by Jeff Easley. The module was designed to be used with the characters from the LJN and TSR D&D toy line, such as Strongheart and Warduke, and comes with game statistics for the characters based on these toy figures.

== Reception ==
Graham Staplehurst reviewed Quest for the Heartstone for White Dwarf, and gave it 4/10 overall, calling it, "no more than a sales exercise for AD&D Action Toys". Staplehurst felt that the module was "very reminiscent of everyone's first dungeon: a collection of randomly placed monsters with a random selection of Good Guys going off after some magic item and having to hack through them," criticizing that "No thought has gone into this at all, as far as I can see, although TSR have done their best with the artwork and maps to try and remedy the situation." Staplehurst pointed out some of the many references within the module to the LJN AD&D toy line ("You may use the Five-headed Hydra Bendable Monster for this encounter", and "the Dragonne monsters produced by LJN Toys Ltd"), noting that "As the adventure progresses ... it merely degenerates into excuses to introduce monsters that happen to be in the TSR figures or LJN range." He also pointed out some of the more bizarre encounters of the adventure, such as two giant crab spiders living in a cabin, and the "Golem Storage Room". Ultimately, Staplehurst said he despaired of ever running the module, as "Few and far between are sensibly planned encounters with alternative courses of action".

Lawrence Schick, in his 1991 book Heroic Worlds, calls this adventure a "Laughable scenario".
