= Stephen R. Marsh =

American tabletop role-playing game designer

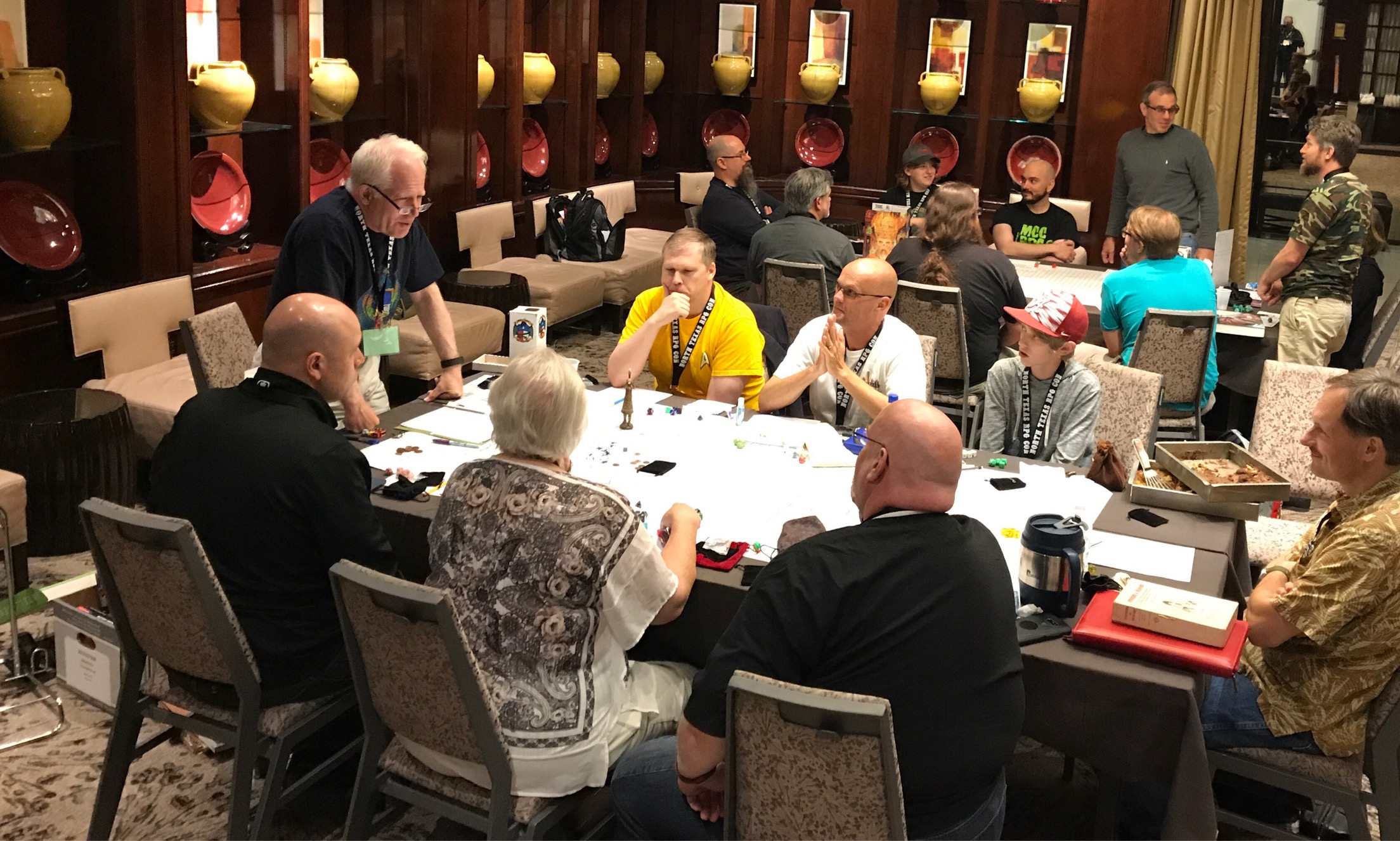
- Stephen R. Marsh at NTRPG Con, June 2017 (Photo: Jonathan Perkel)

Stephen R. "Steve" Marsh is an American game designer and lawyer best known for his contributions to early editions of TSR's Dungeons & Dragons fantasy tabletop role-playing game (RPG). Some of the creatures he created for the original edition of D&D in 1975 have been included in every subsequent edition of the game.

== Game design career ==
=== Early to mid-1970s: Original D&D ===
While attending high school, Marsh began to play military board games. His interest led him to attempt to design what would now be called a roleplaying game based on his board games and using The Golden Bough as the basis for a magic system.

Marsh also suggested a new character class, the mystic, that could teleport to various planes of existence via mental powers. Although the character class concept was not published, some of the mental abilities of the mystic were altered and then published in the Eldritch Wizardry supplement the following year as the first psionic powers for D&D. Marsh was not paid for his creative contributions to either of these rules supplements.

=== 1977-: Advanced D&D ===
Marsh claimed that when Gary Gygax was developing Advanced Dungeons & Dragons, he convinced Gygax to add a Good and Evil axis to the game's character alignment system. (Originally, characters could only be Lawful, Chaotic, or Neutral. By adding a second axis, the number of possible alignments based on combinations of Law, Chaos, Good, Evil, and Neutral grew from three to nine.)

In 1977, most of Marsh's aquatic creature creations were converted to the new AD&D game system by Gary Gygax for use in the Monster Manual; in the preface, Gygax credited Marsh "for devising the creatures for undersea encounters which originally appeared in BLACKMOOR, as I have radically altered them herein."

During the 1980 summer break, he worked at TSR, where he was lead writer on the 1981 version of Dungeons & Dragons Expert Set. He also reviewed and approved licensed Judges Guild products, and helped create the minigame Saga, for which he received one royalty payment — the only time he received compensation for creative work other than his salary.

Steve Marsh completed law school and was admitted to the bar in 1982. He continued to correspond with Gygax in the hopes of creating a hardcover book for which he would be paid royalties, and he convinced Gygax that a rule book about travel to different planes would be worthwhile. Together, Marsh and Gygax started to develop a new AD&D rulebook, The Planes of Existence, which Gygax mentioned in his column in the March 1980 issue of Dragon. A color cube illustrating how their planes would interface appeared in the May 1983 issue of Dragon.

=== Recent years ===
In 2008, several previously unpublished Lovecraft-inspired monsters created by Marsh for his home campaign were published in Monsters of Myth, an e-book published by the First Edition Society. In 2017, he ran three scenarios, including the City of the Revenant, an OD&D scenario, and one other.

== Legal career ==
He was first cited in the Code of Federal Regulations circa 1999.
