= Bestiary of Dragons and Giants =

Tabletop role-playing game supplement for Dungeons & Dragons

- Bestiary of Dragons and Giants Module Cover.
- Code: AC10
- TSR product code: 9211
- Rules required: Dungeons & Dragons Basic, Expert, Companion and Master Sets
- Character levels: 1 - 36
- Campaign setting: Generic
- Authors: Deborah Christian (editor)
- First published: 1987

Linked modules
- AC1, AC2, AC3, AC4, AC5, AC6, AC7, AC8, AC9, AC10, AC11, AC1010, AC1011

Bestiary of Dragons and Giants is an accessory for the Dungeons & Dragons fantasy role-playing game, published in 1987 by TSR.

== Contents ==
Bestiary of Dragons and Giants is a supplement to Dungeons & Dragons (D&D) with 14 short adventure scenarios for each type of dragon and giant. The anthology describes how these high-powered monsters live, work, and relax. It begins with an overview of the lifestyles of dragons and giants, followed by short adventures that take place in different locations, written for a wide variety of character levels. The inside of the cover folder shows the relative sizes of the various monsters. The Dragon Spell Generator can be used to determine which spells the various normal dragons and the powerful dragon rulers prefer. It also includes the statistics for each type of dragon.

== Publication history ==
AC10 Bestiary of Dragons and Giants was edited by Deborah Christian, with a cover by Larry Elmore, and was published by TSR in 1987 as a 64-page booklet with an outer folder. Also included was a Dragon Spell Generator. The supplement featured design by James Ward, Warren Spector, Caroline Spector, Steve Perrin, John Nephew, Thomas Kane, Gary Thomas, John Terra, Deborah Christian, Ray Winninger, Rick Swan, Vince Garcia, Bob Blake, Scott Bennie, and Bruce Heard. Interior illustrations are by Wanda Lybarger and Roger Raupp, with cartography by Dennis Kauth and Ron Kauth.

== Reception ==
Jim Bambra reviewed Bestiary of Dragons and Giants for Dragon magazine #148 (August 1989). Bambra felt that the Bestiary of Dragons and Giants adds little to our knowledge of dragon and giant lore. It does not greatly expand the information already available concerning dragons and giants, but redefines it slightly and provides a ready source of adventures that can either be played as stand-alones or dropped into an ongoing campaign." He found the game aids that come with this product to be of special interest; he thought the monsters on the inside cover were artfully rendered and found them to be a great aid when describing the creatures to the players. He called the Dragon Spell Generator a "nifty device" which comes complete with the statistics of each type of dragon, making it "a great bonus when you consider that the D&D game rules are spread across a total of nine books". Bambra concluded his review by saying, "As an anthology, the Bestiary of Dragons and Giants is quite bitty. But since its major role is to make available a wide variety of adventures about monsters, this is less of a problem. This is a book to dip into for ideas or to find a suitable adventure at short notice, and less a work to be read from cover to cover. If your prime concern is to have a ready source of adventures available, then the Bestiary of Dragons and Giants is a useful product."
