= Midnight on Dagger Alley =

Dungeons & Dragons adventure module

- The cover of the module with art by Jeff Easley.
- Code: MV1
- TSR product code: 9104
- Rules required: AD&D (1st Edition)
- Character levels: 6
- Authors: Merle M. Rasmussen
- First published: 1984

Midnight on Dagger Alley is a solo adventure module for the first Advanced Dungeons & Dragons edition of the Dungeons & Dragons fantasy role-playing game, published in 1984 by TSR, Inc.

== Plot summary ==
Midnight on Dagger Alley is an adventure scenario for one player using multiple player characters, which uses a strip of transparent red film called the "magic viewer" to show hidden text and the map as needed by the player. The adventure takes place in a hazardous thieves' quarter. The module comes with a large map showing the district which requires the magic viewer. The adventure takes place in the city of Goldstar, particularly in its narrow muddy alleyways.

== Gameplay ==
Midnight on Dagger Alley is a solitary adventure designed to be played using three sixth-level pregenerated player characters (monk, assassin, or thief) provided in the module. Each of these characters has a mission that matches them, and the action occurs in the waterfront part of a town which is displayed using four maps to represent the levels of the area: rooftops, second story, ground level, and underground. The three provided adventures involve rescuing a princess, looking for hidden treasure, and searching for the components of a complex spell, although the characters can have encounters simply by wandering around the area.

== Publication history ==
MV1 Midnight on Dagger Alley was published in 1984, and was written by Merle M. Rasmussen. The module features art by Jeff Easley. The module comes in a cardboard folder, with two double-sided maps, a cardboard sheet that has character statistics printed on one side and charts printed on the other side, and an eight-page booklet containing the adventure. The adventure is intended for one player, and can be played in one to three hours. The module also comes with a "magic viewer", a strip of red cellophane in a frame that the player uses to reveal certain map or text areas which are concealed using red mottling.

== Reception ==
David J. Butler reviewed the adventure in The Space Gamer # 73, referring to it instead as Midnight on Dagger Street. Butler felt the camouflage map had definite advantages over the chemical process TSR had previously used to hide text, because the map's features remain hidden no matter how many times the player uses the adventure; additionally he felt that the inability to see beyond the character's immediate area simulates wandering around a foggy waterfront. He felt that the four-level effect was "great fun for players who like to sneak and skulk, and adds a good feeling of depth to the adventure." Butler considered the adventures well thought out. The rescue operation seemed like the central feature of the module and provided a moderate challenge, while the treasure hunt was easiest, because the character is likely to stumble across the treasure even if he loses track of the clues. He thought the search for spell components was the most challenging (although tedious at points). Despite noting some minor faults, Butler felt the adventure gives players "several hours of fun and serves as a good module for inexperienced players."

Chris Hunter reviewed the module in Imagine magazine, giving it a negative review. He noted that the magic viewer works well, giving the impression of a limited field of vision on a moonless night. However, Hunter felt that the module "suffers all the usual problems of solos", in particular a lack of choice and a feeling of being channeled into actions. He thought that the module's main deficiency was that it was far too small. Hunter concluded the review by saying that this was "a novel idea but the size of the module makes it poor value for money".
