= Operation: Seventh Seal =

Operation: Seventh Seal is a 1985 role-playing game adventure published by TSR for Top Secret.

== Plot summary ==
Operation: Seventh Seal is an adventure in which the player character agents are tasked with solving a murder while simultaneously working to save Los Angeles from a threat of nuclear blackmail.

== Publication history ==
Operation: Seventh Seal was written by Evan Robinson and published by TSR in 1985 as a 32-page book with an outer folder.
