= The Kidnapping of Princess Arelina =

Tabletop role-playing game supplement for Dungeons & Dragons

- The cover of The Kidnapping of Princess Arelina (Accessory AC3) shows 3-D Dragon Tiles (cardstock fold-up characters, monsters, and surroundings).
- Code: AC3
- TSR product code: 9121
- Rules required: Dungeons & Dragons Expert Set or Basic Set
- Character levels: 2-5
- Campaign setting: Generic
- Authors: Garry Spiegle
- First published: 1984

Linked modules
- AC1, AC2, AC3, AC4, AC5, AC6, AC7, AC8, AC9, AC10, AC11, AC1010, AC1011

The Kidnapping of Princess Arelina is a fourteen-page accessory designed for the Dungeons & Dragons fantasy role-playing game.

== Contents ==
Garry Spiegle wrote 3-D Dragon Tiles Featuring The Kidnapping of Princess Arelina as a supplement with two purposes in mind. First it included a fairly large number of cardboard cutouts of monsters, characters, and maps called Dragon Tiles. The latter could be configured in different ways to provide a variety of maps for the figure cutouts. Secondly, a small adventure, The Kidnapping of Princess Arelina, came in the same supplement.

=== Dragon tiles ===
The accessory contains a cardstock tile set that can be rearranged to create a dungeon map, and comes with cardboard pieces that represent furniture. Instructions for setting up the tiles are included, and the set is also designed to be usable with Advanced Dungeons & Dragons. The set includes both the cutouts needed to accurately layout the small tower, the enemies the group encounters, and the pre-generated characters for the players.

This package includes 51 3-D figures, featuring characters, creatures, walls, and doors. Two sheets of 84 two-sided feature tiles, showing traps, treasures, furniture, and special surprises, are also included. A Dungeon Mapping Grid is provided to help lay out dungeons quickly.

=== The Kidnapping of Princess Arelina ===
==== Levels ====
The design of the module expects the use of four to eight adventurers between second and fifth level.

==== Pre-generated Characters ====
Eight pre-generated characters come with the module so a group can begin the adventure immediately. They include: Berklai, a fourth level fighter; Awas, a fourth level magic-user; Triak, a fifth level cleric; Penchuri, a fourth level thief; Kuat, a third level ranger; Saudara, a third level magic-user; Teman, a fourth level cleric; and Ambil, a third level thief.

==== Plot summary ====
The plot involves the kidnapping of a royal woman. To take advantage of the castle tile set the entire adventure takes place indoors as the group searches a tower to free the princess. Eventually the group rescues the woman and returns her to the king for their just rewards.

==== Enemies ====
- Ghoul
- Rat, Giant
- Rust Monster
- Shadow
- Skeleton
- Spider, Huge
- Wererat

== Publication history ==
AC3 3-D Dragon Tiles featuring the Kidnapping of Princess Arelina was designed by Garry Spiegle, and published by TSR in 1984 as an 8-page pamphlet, two cardstock folders, and a cardboard counter sheet.

The 10th Anniversary Dungeons & Dragons Collector's Set boxed set, published by TSR in 1984, included the rulebooks from the Basic, Expert, and Companion sets; modules AC2, AC3, B1, B2, and M1, Blizzard Pass; Player Character Record Sheets; and dice; this set was limited to 1,000 copies, and was sold by mail and at GenCon 17.
