= Blizzard Pass =

Dungeons & Dragons adventure module

- Code: MSOLO1 (initially M1)
- TSR product code: 9067
- Rules required: Dungeons & Dragons Basic Set
- Character levels: 1-3
- Campaign setting: Generic D&D
- Authors: David Cook
- First published: 1983

Blizzard Pass was the first solo adventure module for the Dungeons & Dragons fantasy role-playing game. It was published by TSR in 1983 and used the Basic Rules.

== Plot summary ==
Blizzard Pass is a solo adventure for a thief player character of level 1–3. The thief character must cross Blizzard Pass, and then enter a cavern system within Blizzard Pass to free the other adventurers who are held there in a prison. The module also includes a short adventure where a party of characters level 2–3 explore the Pass.

== Publication history ==
Blizzard Pass was written by David Cook and published in 1983. Module M1 consisted of a 32-page booklet with an "invisible ink" pen attached to its outer folder and featured a cover by Tim Truman.

Blizzard Pass is designed for use with the Basic Rules. Hidden messages written in invisible ink are placed throughout the module in blank boxes. The module includes a special pen which reveals the hidden message when the pen is rubbed over a box. The module has a total of 309 entries, nearly half of which are blank and need to be made visible.

The 10th Anniversary Dungeons & Dragons Collector's Set boxed set, published by TSR in 1984, included the rulebooks from the Basic, Expert, and Companion sets; modules AC2, AC3, B1, B2, and M1, Blizzard Pass; Player Character Record Sheets; and dice; this set was limited to 1,000 copies, and was sold by mail and at GenCon 17.

In 1985, TSR published Into the Maelstrom and assigned it the module code M1. To avoid confusion, Blizzard Pass was retroactively assigned the code MSOLO1.

== Reception ==
Doug Cowie reviewed Blizzard Pass for Imagine magazine. He found it very entertaining. Cowie's main criticism was that at the beginning there is a choice between two options "either of which could equally be sound or foolhardy". Picking the wrong one results in the character's death with no chance of escape. After that, though, Cowie felt that the play becomes "more varied and subtle". He thought the invisible ink "a gimmick", but a "hugely entertaining one". In conclusion, Cowie found this a "well thought out an enjoyable solo adventure".

Kelly Grimes reviewed Blizzard Pass for Fantasy Gamer magazine and stated that "The module is actually very well written, so if you don't mind putting up with the frustrating developer, it is worth the price. Otherwise, it would be a good idea to simply leave it be until TSR wises up and starts using wide-tip developers."

Jim Bambra reviewed Blizzard Pass for White Dwarf, and gave it 6/10 overall, calling it "a new departure in module design", noting that "Instead of simply printing all the entries clearly TSR have opted for an invisible ink format." Bambra felt that this short adventure was easy enough to complete with a reasonable amount of luck, but noted that "The invisible ink novelty soon grows a bit thin after you've tediously filled in your 4th and 5th box." Bambra felt that the module was "horrendously overpriced and not worth considering", concluding by saying "M1 is simply not as good as the Fighting Fantasy Gamebooks, which have the advantages of being considerably cheaper and longer. M1's main appeal will lie with children; any just getting into D&D will no doubt greatly enjoy it."

Anders Swenson reviewed Blizzard Pass for Different Worlds magazine and stated that "This is an unnecessarily expensive item because of the funny pen and ink. If you are fanatical about solo adventures, or have small children, or if you like invisible ink, it will be worth the price as it is a well-constructed and complete adventure."
