= Operation: Rapidstrike! =

Tabletop role-playing game supplement

Operation: Rapidstrike! is a 1980 role-playing game adventure for Top Secret published by TSR.

== Plot summary ==
Operation: Rapidstrike! is an adventure in which six player characters try to stop Mademoiselle Larreau from introducing the deadly hallucinogen Zucor into the drug market so she can dominate the world.

== Reception ==
Matt Lussenhop reviewed Operation: Rapidstrike! in The Space Gamer No. 43. Lussenhop commented that "Operation: Rapidstrike! is highly recommended to all administrators. It is an exciting and worthwhile adventure. Hopefully, TSR will produce many more of these non-D&D modules."
