= Player Character Record Sheets =

Tabletop role-playing game supplement for Dungeons & Dragons

- The cover of Player Character Record Sheets (Accessory AC5) shows a group of adventurers emerging from wilderness and approaching ruins of a castle (art by Tom Wham).
- Code: AC5, AC6
- TSR product code: 9037
- Rules required: Dungeons & Dragons Basic, Expert, Companion Sets (Master for AC6)
- Campaign setting: Generic
- First published: 1984 (1985 for AC6)

Linked modules
- AC1, AC2, AC3, AC4, AC5, AC6, AC7, AC8, AC9, AC10, AC11, AC1010, AC1011

Player Character Record Sheets is an accessory designed for the tabletop fantasy role-playing game Dungeons & Dragons.

== Publication history ==
=== Early years: 1974-1977 ===
The first role-playing game published, Dungeons & Dragons (1974), did not include a character sheet. The first one ever published was in the Haven Herald fanzine of Stephen Tihor in May 1975. One month after, another character sheet was released in the APA magazine Alarums and Excursions.

TSR published its first set of Character Record Sheets for the basic Dungeons & Dragons game in 1977. This set featured a cover by Tom Wham and came as a pack of 28 sheets.

=== AD&D: 1979-1986 ===
The first Player Character Record Sheets pack for the first-edition Advanced Dungeons & Dragons game, designed by Harold Johnson and featuring a cover by Erol Otus, was produced in 1979 as a 32-page booklet, with sheets for fighters, clerics, magic users, thieves, and multiclassed characters.

An updated Player Character Record Sheets pack for AD&D (serialized as REF2), with a new cover by Keith Parkinson, was released in 1986 as a 64-page booklet.

REF2 Advanced Dungeons & Dragons Player Character Record Sheets is a booklet containing 16 character sheets, with sufficient spaces included to record information for AD&D characters. Each sheet has check-boxes to record how much supplies and ammunition a character is carrying, and space is provided to record brief information for the family and followers for a character, as well as space to record the "Honor" statistic for Oriental Adventures characters. The package also includes 16 pages of Spell Planner sheets, which lists every spell available to several different character classes, and three check-boxes next to each spell to note when a character uses that spell in a day. Each spell also has a set of symbols that provide information regarding the spell, with a key printed inside the back cover to explain the symbols. This version allowed players to record character information taken from the Unearthed Arcana, Oriental Adventures, and Dungeoneer's Survival Guide sourcebooks.

=== Basic D&D: 1980-1986 ===
Another version, titled Player Character Record Sheets, was printed for the D&D game in 1980 and consisted of a 32-page booklet containing 16 character sheets. The 1980 version of Player Character Record Sheets for Basic D&D includes 16 record sheets to help players track game statistics such as hit points, armor class, ability scores, saving throws, and special abilities, with one side to record such numerical information and the other side to record possessions such as weapons and magical items.

The 10th Anniversary Dungeons & Dragons Collector's Set was a boxed set published by TSR in 1984. It included the rulebooks from the Basic, Expert, and Companion sets; modules AC2, AC3, B1, B2, and M1; Player Character Record Sheets; and dice. This set was limited to 1,000 copies, and was sold by mail and at Gen Con 17.

Player Character Record Sheets (serialized as AC5) was released in 1985 for characters from the Basic, Expert, and Companion boxed sets for the Dungeons & Dragons game. The new rules rendered these character sheets outdated. The AC6 set came out almost immediately after this release, which included character sheets compatible with the rules introduced in Master Rules as well.

AC6 Player Character Record Sheets contains 16 character sheets and 8 spell roster sheets, allowing players to record character information from the Basic, Expert, Companion, and Master Rules sets.

=== AD&D 2nd Edition:1989 ===
A simplified and revised 80-page version of REF2 Player Character Record Sheets was printed in 1989 for 2nd edition AD&D.

=== D&D v3.5: 2004 ===
A set of Deluxe Player Character Record Sheets was published for D&D 3.5 featuring cover art by Wayne Reynolds.

== Reception ==
Elisabeth Barrington reviewed the 1980 Player Character Record Sheets for Basic D&D in The Space Gamer No. 35. She felt that "They are very neatly printed in large type and fairly well organized. There is room for all the numbers and other information necessary, and a box for your character's sketch or symbol." She did note that "However, this is for really simple D&D players: character class is defined as fighter, magic-user, thief, cleric, dwarf, elf, or halfling. The section, 'to-hit roll needed,' does not provide for differing types of weapons - just 10 numbers for the respective amour classes." Barrington concluded her review by saying it was "Recommended for Basic D&D gamers."

Tom Zunder reviewed the REF2 Advanced Dungeons & Dragons Player Character Record Sheets for the British magazine Adventurer #6 (January 1987). He commented that "I really wanted this to be a scenario, the cover art is so nice that it could have been great," and added that "Character sheets are something which not everyone really wants to buy, but these are very nice". He notes that no permission to photocopy is given, meaning a relatively high price "for something that most people could replace with a sheet of A4." He concluded: "That sort of price kind of kills the conversation, doesn't it? Well they are very nice sheets, and in presenting the full breadth of AD&D, they look pretty good. Then again, it costs a lot to have that many rule books, and most people have their own variants... How useful are they? The spell checkers certainly aren't; the print is too small, and their use not exactly proven. I'm afraid I'm going to have to give a thumbs down on this, Sorry guys."

Graeme Davis reviewed the REF2 Advanced Dungeons & Dragons Player Character Record Sheets for White Dwarf #86. Davis wrote that the sheets have "spaces for recording everything you could ever want to record for an AD&D character ... I'm not sure whether there is enough space for things like magic items and weapons, but apart from that everything you'd expect is here." Complimenting the booklet's cover art, Davis said "it's got a very nice cover". He felt that the symbols for each spell were "a nice idea", though he despaired that learning how to use them "could be hard work". He lamented that the brown tone used on the sheets would mean that some parts would come out black when photocopied. Although he felt that 16 character sheets was not a lot for the money, he predicted that "this product will sell well among AD&D players who like using Official character sheets, and not so well among those who don't".
