= The Isle of Dread =

Dungeons & Dragons adventure

- Cover art by Jeff Dee
- Code: X1
- TSR product code: 9043
- Rules required: D&D Expert Set
- Character levels: 3 - 7
- Campaign setting: Mystara
- Authors: David Cook, Tom Moldvay
- First published: 1981

Linked modules
- X1, X2, X3, X4, X5, X6, X7, X8, X9, X10, X11, X12, X13, XL1, XSOLO, XS2

The Isle of Dread is an adventure for the Dungeons & Dragons role-playing game. The adventure, module code X1, was originally published in 1981. Written by David "Zeb" Cook and Tom Moldvay, it is among the most widely circulated of all Dungeons & Dragons adventures due to its inclusion as part of the D&D Expert Set. In the adventure, the player characters arrive on the Isle of Dread seeking a lost treasure, and there encounter new nonhuman races.

== Plot summary ==
The Isle of Dread is meant to introduce players and Dungeon Masters familiar with only dungeon crawl-style adventures to wilderness exploration. As such, the adventure has only a very simple plot, even by the standards of its time. The module has been described as an adventure scenario for medium- to high-level player characters, which takes place on an unexplored tropical island which has been divided by a stone wall built in ancient times.

The characters somehow find a fragment from a ship's log, describing a mysterious island on which many treasures can be found, and set out to explore it. Typically, the characters will first make landfall near the more or less friendly village of Tanaroa and after possibly dealing with some troublesome factions in the village, set out to explore the interior of the island. In the course of their explorations, they may find a number of other villages of unfamiliar intelligent creatures, numerous hostile monsters and the treasures they guard, and a band of pirates. Many prehistoric creatures, including dinosaurs, are prominently featured, especially in the original printing of the adventure. Near the center of the island is a hidden temple inhabited by monstrous, mind-bending creatures known as kopru; the characters may stumble across it or learn that it is a source of problems for the other inhabitants of the isle, and the climax of the adventure typically consists of the characters exploring this temple, battling its inhabitants, and uncovering its secrets.

== Publication history ==
The Isle of Dread was the first published adventure for any version of Dungeons & Dragons to focus on wilderness exploration as a major theme. This would go on to be an important element in many other adventures, including most of the rest of the X-series. It also introduced numerous creatures to the game for the first time, including the kopru and aranea, both of which went on to find a place in the Third Edition Monster Manual; the rakasta and phanaton, both of which would later appear as playable races in other Dungeons & Dragons products set in Mystara; and many others, including several types of dinosaurs.

This product marks the first appearance of the continent for the Dungeons & Dragons world that includes locations such as Darokin, Karameikos, Ylaruam, and Thyatis.

The adventure was loosely based on King Kong, and came with a fairly detailed (for its time) map of a setting then called the Known World, showing at least fifteen distinct nations on the mainland to the north, as well as much of the Sea of Dread in which the Isle of Dread could be found. These nations each received a paragraph or so of description near the beginning of the module.

Two very different-looking versions of this adventure were printed. The first edition was printed in 1981, and the second edition in 1983; both were thirty two page books in an outer folder which featured cover artwork by Jeff Dee. The Isle of Dread was included in every copy of the 1981 version of the D&D Expert Set as an example of an outdoor adventure and setting. This version is laid out in the style characteristic of early D&D adventures: it had no Dungeons & Dragons logo, a diagonal strip in the top left corner indicated which edition of the game it was for, and the back cover featured an illustration and a list of other D&D products of the time. It was available on its own and packaged with the original version of the Expert Set by David "Zeb" Cook. It was often sold already three-hole punched, and had several distinguishable printings of its own.

The Isle of Dread was developed by Paul Reiche III, and edited by Jon Pickens with assistance from Harold Johnson, Patrick L. Price, Edward G. Sollers, Steve Sullivan, and David Cook. The module features art by Jeff Dee, David S. LaForce, Erol Otus, David C. Sutherland III, and Bill Willingham.

The second version, which first appeared in 1983, was packaged with the revised version of the Expert Set by Frank Mentzer, and featured cover art by Timothy Truman. Its cover featured a red-orange border. The revised version used the layout elements that were typical of mid-1980s Dungeons & Dragons adventures: the game's current logo was prominently featured on the cover, the diagonal strip was replaced with a horizontal one across the top, and the back cover featured no illustration but did have a text description of the adventure. There are a few minor differences besides appearance between this and the earlier version, including the replacement of a few monsters, and a mapping error that makes part of the final temple appear to be completely inaccessible.

The Isle of Dread is ISBN 978-0-935696-30-1.

In December 2018, Goodman Games published Original Adventures Reincarnated #2: The Isle of Dread under license from Wizards of the Coast. This 328-page hardback contains reprints of the 1981 and 1983 editions, an interview with "Zeb" Cook, and a 5th edition conversion of the adventure.

== In other works ==
The Isle is also a minor encounter area in the later adventure Lathan's Gold, and receives some further mention in several later D&D products such as the Poor Wizard's Almanac series.

Issue No. 114 of Dungeon magazine features an update on the Isle of Dread as a Greyhawk setting, a remake-sequel to The Isle of Dread entitled Torrents of Dread, and a poster-style map of the island, as well some smaller surrounding islands.

In this update, the island was located in the Densac Gulf, a region bordered by the Azure Sea to the north, the Pearl Sea to the south, the Amedio Jungle to the west, and Hepmonaland to the east. This large expanse of ocean contains several island chains, one of which is the Isle of Dread itself. The update details a kopru plot that destroyed the city of the original Olman settlers through the power of a giant black pearl imbued with the influence of Demogorgon, the demonic god of the kopru. The isle has become a mad collection of kopru, other aquatic races, demonic beings, dinosaurs, and savage Olman natives.

In the announcement for Dungeon's Savage Tide Adventure Path, Erik Mona mentioned that the Isle will be prominently featured in Savage Tide. Though most place names and other such references will be to the World of Greyhawk setting, Mona has stated that there will also be a number of Mystara references, in something of an homage to the Isle's roots.

The first Savage Tide adventure set on the Isle of Dread is "Here There Be Monsters", found in Dungeon No. 142 (January 2007). The Isle of Dread remains the setting for the next three adventures: "Tides of Dread," in issue No. 143; "The Lightless Depths," in issue No. 144; and "City of Broken Idols," in issue No. 145.

The D&D 4th edition supplement Manual of the Planes (2008) establishes the Isle of Dread as a location in the Feywild (a parallel plane dominated by faeries and unspoiled natural life) as part of its general reorganisation of the D&D cosmos.

The D&D 5th edition Dungeon Master Guide (2014) places the Isle of Dread in the Plane of Water, though it mentions that the island has the ability to appear in the Material Plane.

== In video games ==
Dungeons & Dragons Online released an adaptation of the Isle of Dread in 2022. It details how Vecna, a deity from another setting, took over the Isle and turned it to a semi base of operations with the help of the Kopru.

== Reception ==
In Issue 38 of The Space Gamer, Aaron Allston commented that an introductory adventure must be enjoyable, must provide a new gamemaster with a model for how adventures work, and must be easy to read. Allston commented "This adventure goes a long way towards accomplishing those goals. The scenario itself, set on an island whose simple human culture bears tinges of Polynesian and Amerind societies, is relatively tame, but provides some tense moments. Enough variable situations are presented to keep the whole thing from becoming static. More important, in this instance, is the module's organization as a prototype. It does well here, too; almost all the maps can be removed and the appropriate text descriptions are clearly keyed to the proper maps." Allston warned, "This scenario cannot be played cold, which is also a necessary experience for a novice DM; it must first by read through and assessed." Allston also pointed out this adventure "will not appeal to experienced players; there is a certain lack of color or sweep to the whole thing." Allston concluded, "Recommended to beginners only – but it says so on the cover."

In Issue 12 of Different Worlds, Anders Swenson noted "Isle of Dread is overall an excellent product. For my needs, it is probably the best of the modules TSR have produced. Many GMs will find it a worthwhile purchase."

To commemorate the 30th anniversary of the Dungeons & Dragons game, Erik Mona and James Jacobs chose their Top Thirty Greatest Dungeons & Dragons adventures of all time, and ranked The Isle of Dread in 16th place.

After designer Tom Moldvay's death in 2007, Steve Winter called The Isle of Dread "Tom's work that had the widest impact", as its inclusion in the Expert Set "made it one of the most widely known and played adventures for years".

James Maliszewski said "There's no rhyme or reason to it, but it's all incredibly evocative and a blast to play, which, in the end, are the only measures by which any adventure module should be judged."

Writing for Black Gate in 2014, Scott Taylor listed the cover art of Isle of Dread by Jeff Dee as #4 in The Top 10 TSR Cover Paintings of All Time.

The French RPG magazine La Gazette du Donjon gave this adventure a top rating of 5 out of 5, saying that although there were inconsistencies with the scale of its maps, "It's full of random encounter tables, descriptions of locations, tribes, monsters and NPCs. It can become an ultra-rich campaign setting, for those who like to exercise their creative talents. The whole is of a fairly high difficulty and should be avoided by beginners."

In his 2023 book Monsters, Aliens, and Holes in the Ground, RPG historian Stu Horvath noted, "Its true power lies in a single page: The map of the Island — its shores charted, its interior blank. There are few things in RPGs as tantalizing as a blank map. All of those empty hexes are a challenge, and the imagination leaps to fill them."
