= Combat Shield and Mini-adventure =

Tabletop role-playing game supplement for Dungeons & Dragons

Combat Shield and Mini Adventure
- The cover of The Combat Shield and Mini Adventure (Accessory AC2) shows three monsters gathered together (art by Jeff Easley).
- Code: AC2
- TSR product code: 9099
- Rules required: Dungeons & Dragons Expert Set or Basic Set
- Character levels: 4-7
- Campaign setting: Generic
- Authors: David Cook
- First published: 1984

Linked modules
- AC1, AC2, AC3, AC4, AC5, AC6, AC7, AC8, AC9, AC10, AC11, AC1010, AC1011

AC2 Combat Shield and Mini-Adventure is a 14-page accessory designed for the Basic Set and Expert Set of the Dungeons & Dragons fantasy role-playing game. It was published in 1984 by TSR, Inc. and written by David Cook.

== Contents ==
David Cook wrote Combat Shield and Mini-Adventure as a supplement with two purposes in mind. First it included a screen to hide a Gamemaster's material and dice rolls during the course of play and provide useful tables for quick reference. Secondly, a small adventure, The Treasure of the Hideous One, came in the same supplement.

=== Combat Shield ===
This DM's screen contains tables for the Basic and Expert D&D rules. The Combat Shield in this supplement is a precursor to far more elaborate GM screens used today. It can be used with either/or the Basic or Expert set. It included tables for saving throws, thief abilities, undead turning, to-hit rolls, the combat sequence, monster experience tables, and player experience tables among other items.

=== The Treasure of the Hideous One ===
==== Plot summary ====
This adventure follows along relatively traditional paths. The group of player characters finds a message that indicates a long hidden treasure lies somewhere in a swampy region. An expedition led by an intrepid explorer attempted to find the treasure but came to an untimely end.

The group eventually fights their way through various enemies to secure the treasure and learn the fate of the original expedition. The module lists several possible treasures to choose as the final reward.

Despite the shortness of the adventure it requires a fairly advanced party because of the presence of Rosentos the Vampire.

== Publication history ==
AC2 Combat Shield and Mini-Adventure was designed by David Cook, with cover art by Jeff Easley, and was published by TSR in 1984 as a cardstock screen with an 8-page pamphlet.

The 10th Anniversary Dungeons & Dragons Collector's Set boxed set, published by TSR in 1984, included the rulebooks from the Basic, Expert, and Companion sets; modules AC2, AC3, B1, B2, and M1, Blizzard Pass; Player Character Record Sheets; and dice; this set was limited to 1,000 copies, and was sold by mail and at GenCon 17.

== Reception ==
Doug Cowie reviewed AC2 for Imagine magazine, giving it a positive review. He particularly praised the looks of the product, singling out the cover art as finally offering a credible visual of the game's monsters. Cowie liked the functionality of the referee screen, noting the sensible choice of tables and the effort to create a single "to-hit" table for all character classes. However, he found the latter "quite difficult to read". Cowie also faulted the screen's three-page player side for containing not just the excellent cover and one page worth of information but also one page of "hype". Cowie thought the mini-adventure "rather good", "original and carefully thought out". According to him, the adventure alone was worth the price of the product, with the screen a "reasonably useful" bonus.
