= Crimefighters =

Tabletop role-playing game

- Dark Night Dan, wielding a sword cane, and an enemy saboteur
- Designers: David Cook
- Illustrators: Jeff Dee; David C. Sutherland III
- Publishers: TSR
- Publication: 1981; 45 years ago
- Genres: Crime
- Playing time: Varies
- Chance: Dice
- Skills: Improvisation, arithmetic, role-playing

Crimefighters is a TSR pulp-themed tabletop role-playing game created by game designer David Cook. Crimefighters was originally released in issue 47 of the March 1981 edition of Dragon magazine. This issue of Dragon magazine also contained an introductory Crimefighters adventure called The Case of the Editor’s Envelope.

The game featured artwork by artist Jeff Dee who also drew the Crimefighters game character Dark Night Dan.

Crimefighters was included in the Dragon Magazine Archive, a collection of five CD-ROMs comprising the first 250 issues of Dragon magazine.

== Game overview ==
Crimefighters emulates the 1930s pulp adventures of characters such as Doc Savage, The Spirit, The Spider and The Shadow.

Character classes players can choose from are Defender, a law-abiding crimefighter, Avenger, a vigilante, or Pragmatist, one who obeys the spirit, if not the letter of the law.
