= Top Secret Agent Dossiers =

Spy fiction role-playing game supplement

Agent Dossiers
- Publishers: TSR, Inc.
- Publication: 1983; 42 years ago
- Genres: Spy fiction
- Systems: Custom percentile

Agent Dossiers is a role-playing game supplement published by TSR, Inc. in 1983 for Top Secret. ISBN 0880380705

== Contents ==
Agent Dossiers is a set of sixteen 8 1/4" x 10 1/4" character sheets for Top Secret.

== Reception ==
Nick Davison reviewed Agent Dossiers in Imagine magazine, stating that it is "Not a vital aid to playing the Top Secret game, but certainly a great deal tidier."

Kevin Allen also reviewed Top Secret Agent Dossiers in Space Gamer No. 70. He commented that "Overall, the new Agent Dossier is an improvement over the old one [...] If you don't mind the cost, though, it's a good buy... and if you've played Top Secret for long, like I have, you need a new character sheet."
