= Thunderdelve Mountain =

1985 Dungeons & Dragons adventure module

- Code: XS2
- TSR product code: 9157
- Rules required: Dungeons & Dragons Expert
- Character levels: 7-9
- Authors: William Carlson
- First published: 1985
- ISBN: 978-0880382427

Linked modules
- X1, X2, X3, X4, X5, X6, X7, X8, X9, X10, X11, X12, X13, XL1, XSOLO, XS2

Thunderdelve Mountain is an adventure module published in 1985 for the Dungeons & Dragons fantasy role-playing game.

== Plot summary ==
Thunderdelve Mountain is a solo adventure scenario for a dwarf player character who must defeat a monster alone. The module also instructions for running the adventure with a full party of characters instead.

The player characters must fight Fyrsnaca, a fire breathing worm. The module includes new monsters: vapor ghouls, red worms and the Fyrsnaca.

== Publication history ==
XS2 Thunderdelve Mountain was written by William Carlson, with a cover by Larry Elmore, and was published by TSR in 1985 as a 40-page booklet with an outer folder.
