= Operation: Ace of Clubs =

Tabletop role-playing game supplement

Operation: Ace of Clubs is a 1984 role-playing game adventure for Top Secret published by TSR.

== Plot summary ==
Ace of Clubs is an adventure in which the player characters pose as students at the Ace of Clubs, a private upstate New York resort which is secretly a spy training facility, to investigate the mysterious deaths of school instructors.

== Reception ==
Nick Davison reviewed TS006 – Ace of Clubs for Imagine magazine and stated, "This is a disappointment after the excellent Orient Express and unlike that scenario it will not provide many sessions of play. The 'mystery' which the players are given to solve seems a bit too shallow, especially if they are given the rumours suggested at the beginning. Perhaps it is worth missing these out; I did."

Kevin Allen reviewed Operation: Ace of Clubs in Space Gamer No. 74. Allen commented, "Ace of Clubs is another good Top Secret adventure – not great, mind you, but good. Its faults are relatively minor, and it's reusable – which is a major plus, and thankfully getting to be the rule in gaming adventures nowadays. However, despite the novice disclaimer, I recommend players have a couple of missions under their belts before embarking on this one."
