= Lady in Distress (Top Secret) =

1982 role-playing game adventure

Lady in Distress is a 1982 role-playing game adventure published by TSR for Top Secret.

== Plot summary ==
Lady in Distress is an adventure in which terrorists hijack the cruise ship Corona and the player characters are agents who must overcome the hijackers and also find a hidden cache of mutated disease cultures onboard. The mission unfolds as a tactical search-and-shoot operation aboard the ship. The supplement includes pull-out aids, pre-generated characters, and room-by-room descriptions.

This adventure scenario tasks midlevel player characters with infiltrating a hijacked cruise ship to eliminate the terrorists. It includes a detailed ship description and deck plans, making it adaptable for other adventures.

== Publication history ==
Lady in Distress was written by Mike Carr and Corey Koebernick, with art by Jeff Easley, and was published by TSR in 1982 as a 32-page book with an outer folder.

Lady in Distress was first run as a tournament scenario at GenCon XIV before its official publication.

== Reception ==
Anders Swenson reviewed Lady in Distress for Different Worlds magazine and stated that "The fact that a plausible adventure has been laid over the basic ship in such a way as to make the least distortion of the basic vessel description is in some way laudatory, but in others incidental to the basic value of this scenario booklet. The lady may be in distress. but she is not distressed merchandise. Everybody go out and buy yourselves a ship!"

== Reviews ==
- Diary of the Doctor Who Role-Playing Games (Issue 2 - Sep 2010)
