= Operation: Fastpass =

Tabletop role-playing game supplement

Operation: Fastpass is a 1983 role-playing game adventure for Top Secret written by Philip Taterczynski and published by TSR.

== Plot summary ==
Operation: Fastpass is an espionage mission in which the agent team attends a Hungarian puzzle convention where they will need to help a defecting Soviet scientist and puzzle expert.

== Publication history ==
Operation: Fastpass was the fourth adventure published by TSR for Top Secret.

== Reception ==
Nick Davison reviewed Operation: Fastpass for Imagine magazine and stated that "Overall [...] an interesting scenario for players and GMs alike."

Kevin Allen reviewed Operation: Fastpass in Space Gamer No. 70. Allen commented that "This is the best, and closest to the genre, of the Top Secret modules yet. It's comprehensive and flexible, and a great challenge for any would-be superspy. One personal comment: I wouldn't take novice agents into this one; a minimum of second or third level, with several missions under the belt, should be required."
