= Operation: Orient Express =

Tabletop role-playing game supplement

Operation: Orient Express is a 1983 role-playing game adventure for Top Secret published by TSR.

== Plot summary ==
Operation: Orient Express is an adventure packet which presents a setting for six mission scenarios on a European railway.

== Reception ==
Nick Davison reviewed Operation: Orient Express for Imagine magazine, and stated that "This is a novel scenario which should be fun for GM and players alike. Best used in between other adventures - otherwise your players could become fed up with all those train journeys!"

Jerry Epperson reviewed Operation: Orient Express in Space Gamer No. 70. Epperson commented that "If an Administrator can get by the small omissions in Orient Express, what remains is a solid and impressive collection of scenarios that will keep players busy for many game sessions to come. If you are going to buy any Top Secret module, this is the one to grab. It is a cut above anything TSR has produced and is highly recommended."
