= Lathan's Gold =

Dungeons & Dragons module

- Code: XSOLO
- TSR product code: 9082
- Authors: Merle M. Rassmussen
- First published: 1984

Linked modules
- X1, X2, X3, X4, X5, X6, X7, X8, X9, X10, X11, X12, X13, XL1, XSOLO, XS2

Lathan's Gold is an adventure module published in 1984 for the Dungeons & Dragons fantasy role-playing game.

== Plot summary ==
Lathan's Gold is a solo adventure scenario in which the single player character searches islands on the Sea of Dread for money to pay ransom to a kidnapper.

== Publication history ==
XSOLO Lathan's Gold was written by Merle M. Rassmussen, with illustrations by Jeff Easley, and was published by TSR in 1984 as a 32-page booklet with an outer folder.
