= David Cook (game designer) =

American game designer

- Cook at Dragon Con in 2026
- Born: East Lansing, Michigan, U.S.
- Other name: Zeb
- Occupations: Game designer, writer
- Spouse: Helen
- Children: Ian

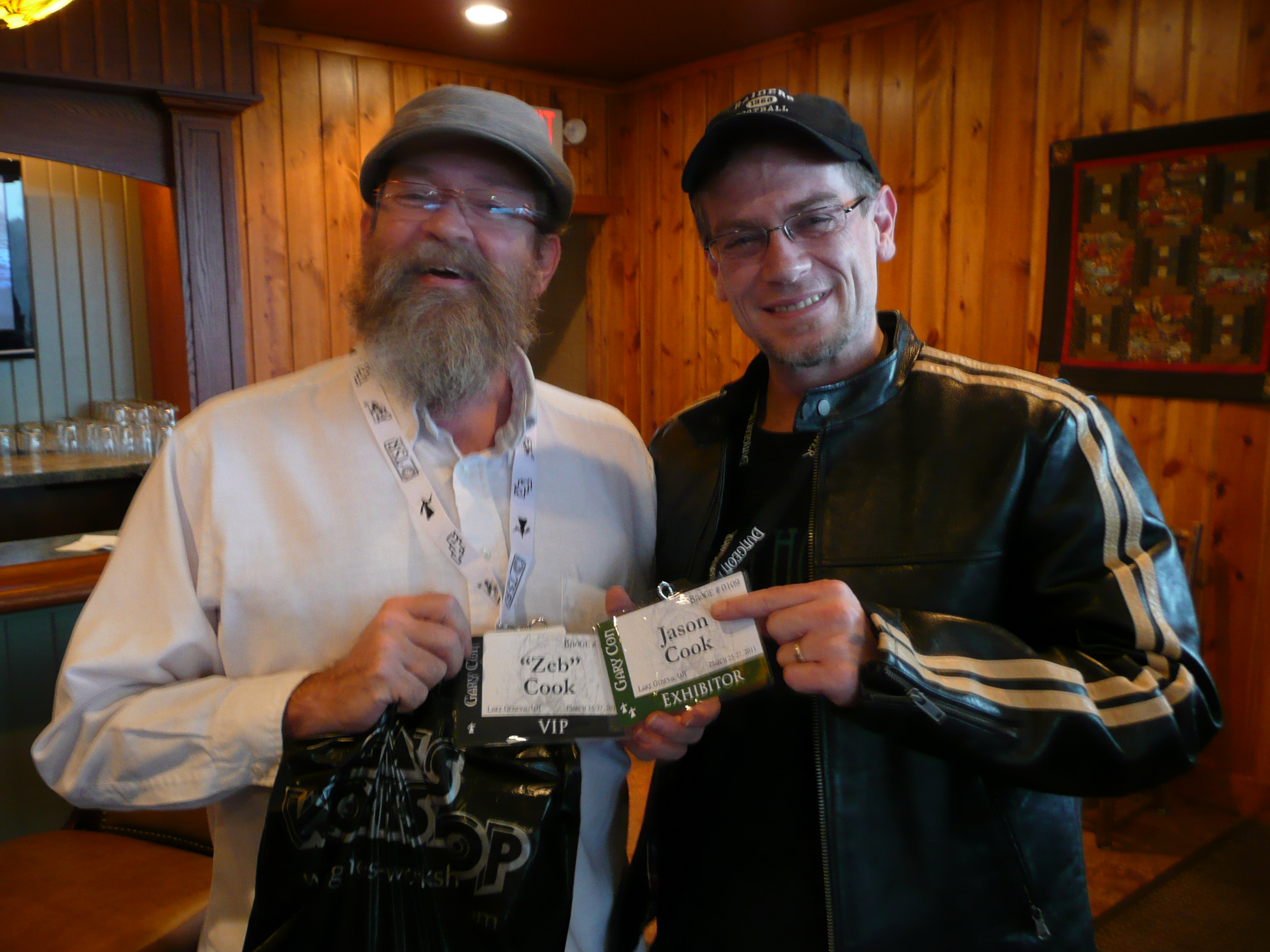
David "Zeb" Cook (left) at GaryCon III

David "Zeb" Cook is an American game designer, best known for his work at TSR, Inc., where he was employed for over fifteen years. Cook designed several games, wrote the Expert Set for Dungeons & Dragons, worked as lead designer of the second edition of Advanced Dungeons & Dragons, and invented the Planescape setting for AD&D. He is a member of the Origins Hall of Fame.

== Early life ==
Cook was born in East Lansing, Michigan, and grew up on a farm in Iowa. His father was a farmer and college professor. In junior high school, Cook played wargames such as Avalon Hill's Blitzkrieg and Afrika Korps: "I was primarily a wargamer, but there wasn't any role-playing available then." In college, he was introduced to the Dungeons & Dragons role-playing game through the University of Iowa gaming club.

Cook earned his B.A. in English (with a Theater minor) in 1977. He married his high school sweetheart, Helen, and they had one son, Ian. Cook became a high school teacher in Milligan, Nebraska, where his students gave him his nickname of "Zeb". The name derives from his signature, which is dominated by a stroke resembling a 'Z,' as well as from his resemblance to the James Arness character Zeb Macahan in the TV series How the West Was Won.

== Career ==
Cook responded to an ad in Dragon magazine for a game designer position at TSR. After writing a sample module section and completing the designer test that the company then used, Cook became the third full-time game designer hired by TSR. Lawrence Schick was head of design and development at the time and brought Cook on board during a time of substantial growth at TSR. Cook later became Senior Designer. "Game designing is hard work [...] but everything worth doing is hard work. The important thing is to do it well, and to have fun while you're doing it." Cook created role-playing games, modules, family board games, card games, rulebooks, and party mystery games.

He created the Partyzone mystery game line and The Spy Ring scenario. The first Partyzone game was named one of the Top 100 Games of 1985 by Games Magazine. Other notable works for TSR include the role-playing games Conan the Barbarian, Crimefighters, The Adventures of Indiana Jones, Star Frontiers, Sirocco, and Escape from New York. Cook also wrote several influential early adventure modules for D&D and AD&D, such as A1: Slave Pits of the Undercity, I1: Dwellers of the Forbidden City, X1: The Isle of Dread, X4: Master of the Desert Nomads, and X5: Temple of Death (the 'Desert Nomads' series). Other module work included CM4: Earthshaker!, AC5: Dragon Tiles II, AC2: D&D Game Combat Shield, B6: The Veiled Society, CB1: Conan Unchained!, and M1: Blizzard Pass for D&D and AD&D, and Top Secret module TS005: Orient Express and Boot Hill module BH2: Lost Conquistador Mine.

After Tom Moldvay wrote the second edition of the D&D Basic Set, published in 1980, Cook developed the Expert Set to take characters beyond third level. Cook was the primary author of the original Oriental Adventures, ostensibly under the guidance and direction of Gary Gygax, which among other things introduced the concept of non-weapon proficiencies into AD&D, and he designed the far eastern setting, Kara-Tur. Cook, with Jim Ward, Steve Winter, and Mike Breault, co-wrote the adventure scenario that was adapted into the game Pool of Radiance. Cook was the lead designer on the 2nd edition of Advanced Dungeons & Dragons role-playing game. In Dragon #118 (February 1987), Cook wrote the column "Who Dies?" in which he discussed which character classes may be thrown out in the revision, with the intention of provoking a response from readers. Cook was also the lead designer on the Planescape campaign setting. When TSR was looking to replace Spelljammer after the setting ended, Slade Henson suggested that a new campaign setting could be built using the original Manual of the Planes; after the idea went unused for a year, Cook took it over and invented Planescape as a result. One reviewer described Planescape as "the finest game world ever produced for Advanced Dungeons & Dragons".

Cook left TSR in 1994 to work in the field of electronic media. He worked on the game Fallout 2. He was the lead designer on the 2005 City of Villains computer game for Cryptic Studios. After he left Cryptic, he joined Cheyenne Mountain Entertainment as the lead systems designer for the video game Stargate Worlds. In 2001 he was inducted into the Origins Hall of Fame.

In 2013, Cook worked as Content Designer at ZeniMax Online Studios on The Elder Scrolls Online. With the release of the Elsweyr expansion for the game in June 2019, Cook was credited as a Senior Product Owner for Bethesda.Net.

== See also ==
- Amazing Engine
- Crimefighters
- Dwellers of the Forbidden City
- List of Dungeons & Dragons modules
- Scourge of the Slave Lords
