= Dungeons & Dragons Companion Set =

Tabletop role-playing game supplement for Dungeons & Dragons

- Cover art by Larry Elmore
- Author: Frank Mentzer
- Illustrator: Larry Elmore; Jeff Easley
- Genre: Fantasy
- Publisher: TSR
- Publication date: 1984

The Dungeons & Dragons Companion Set is an expansion boxed set for the Dungeons & Dragons (D&D) fantasy role-playing game. It was first published in 1984 as an expansion to the Dungeons & Dragons Basic Set.

== Publication history ==
The Dungeons & Dragons Basic Set was revised in 1983 by Frank Mentzer as Dungeons & Dragons Set 1: Basic Rules. Between 1983 and 1985, this system was revised and expanded by Mentzer as a series of five boxed sets, including the Basic Rules, Expert Rules (supporting character levels 4 through 14), Companion Rules (supporting levels 15 through 25), Master Rules (supporting levels 26 through 36), and Immortal Rules (supporting Immortals – characters who had transcended levels). The Companion Rules set was written by Mentzer, with art by Larry Elmore and Jeff Easley. It was published by TSR in 1984 as a boxed set containing a 64-page book and a 32-page book. The set contains two booklets: Player's Companion: Book One and Dungeon Master's Companion: Book Two, which were edited by Anne Gray.

The 10th Anniversary Dungeons & Dragons Collector's Set boxed set, published by TSR in 1984, included the rulebooks from the Basic, Expert, and Companion sets; modules AC2, AC3, B1, B2, and M1, Blizzard Pass; Player Character Record Sheets; and dice. This set was limited to 1,000 copies and was sold by mail and at GenCon 17.

== Contents ==
The Player's Companion presents information for characters who have reached levels 15-25. The book begins with commentary regarding the changes a character would go through since they began as an adventurer at level one. It introduces game statistics for new weapons, types of armor, and rules to use with unarmed combat as well as providing details on how to run a stronghold and its recurrent costs, including the wages for the castle staff. The Player's Companion describes the new abilities as well as improvements in skills, spells, and other abilities that increase for members of each character class as they improve in level. This section focuses entirely on human characters, and handles dwarves, elves, and halflings separately. The concept of "attack rank" is introduced for the three demi-human classes; although, per the Expert Set rules, they are capped at a specified maximum level, further accumulation of experience points increases their combat abilities. It also introduces the optional character class of druid, presented as a special progression for clerics of neutral alignment.

The Dungeon Master's Companion opens on general guidelines for running an adventuring campaign and how to plan adventures for characters of level 15 and higher. The introduction also presents a feudal system in which the dominions would the player characters would be granted or conquer. This section concludes by providing notes on how to organize and run tournaments. The section after that is titled "The War Machine" and was designed by Douglas Niles and Gary Spiegel as a system for handling large-scale battles, especially warfare that is only part of the campaign background. This book details how to run high-level campaigns, including rules for mass combat, other worlds and planes, and game statistics for new monsters and treasure. It also contains three short adventure scenarios.

== Reception ==
In Issue 31 of Abyss, Dave Nalle called this "a hodgepodge of additional information ... some new weapons and rules for combat, plus a rather confused and misleading set of guidelines for setting up a stronghold community." Nalle thought that "everything in this book is a reiteration of material in the normal [Advanced Dungeons & Dragons] rules." Although Nalle called the concept of a campaign game where characters rule territory "a good idea", he found "some of the mechanics seem unrealistic and extremely dependent on random die rolls and arbitrary comparisons." Overall, Nalle called the balance of material in the gamemaster's book "the same old stuff." Nalle concluded, "On the whole, this is not an offensive game aid, save that its main aim is to get more money from munchkins [players who construct the most powerful characters possible] ... this volume could be described as 'what to do with your character when they've killed all the monsters in the Monster Manual and have all the magic items in the Dungeon Masters Guide'."

In issue 61 of White Dwarf (January 1985), Megan C. Robertson noted that most characters that reach 15th level in the Basic D&D game should be thinking of settling down and retiring and felt that the D&D Companion Set provided "some ideas for this to be a little more interesting than simple retirement." Robertson concluded by giving this book a rating of 7 out of 10 overall.
