= Dungeons & Dragons Expert Set =

Tabletop role-playing game supplement for Dungeons & Dragons

- The cover of the 1981 Expert Set rule book; cover art by Erol Otus
- Author: David Cook and Stephen R. Marsh (1981 version); Frank Mentzer (1983 version)
- Genre: Role-playing game
- Publisher: TSR
- Publication date: 1981, 1983

The Expert Set is an expansion boxed set for the Dungeons & Dragons fantasy role-playing game. It was first published in 1981 as an expansion to the Basic Set.

Having been told that Greyhawk was reserved for Advanced Dungeons & Dragons, Schick and Moldvay decided to use their own setting of Mystara, specifically around The Known World area which resembled 15th century Europe.

== Publication history ==
=== 1981 version ===
The Basic Set saw a major revision in 1981 by Tom Moldvay. The overarching goal of the revision was to provide subsequent expansions to the game, each describing a specific set of levels of character development. The Basic Set described character levels 1 through 3, as had its immediate predecessor, the Basic Set edited by J. Eric Holmes in 1977. The Moldvay Basic Set was immediately followed by the release of the Expert Set edited by Dave Cook and Stephen R. Marsh, supporting character levels 4 through 14. The Isle of Dread was included in the set as an example of an outdoor adventure and setting. The set included dice, and featured cover art by Erol Otus.

=== 1983 revision ===
The Basic Set was revised once more in 1983, this time by Frank Mentzer, as Dungeons & Dragons Set 1: Basic Rules. Mentzer continued to revise and expand this system between 1983 and 1985 as a series consisting of five boxed sets, beginning with the Basic Rules, and continuing through the Expert Rules (supports characters of level 4 through 14), Companion Rules (supports characters of level 15 through 25), Master Rules (supports characters of level 26 through 36), and Immortal Rules (supports Immortals – characters that have transcended levels). The first four sets were later compiled as a single hardcover book, the Dungeons & Dragons Rules Cyclopedia (1991).

The Mentzer Expert Set featured art by Larry Elmore, and was published as a boxed set with dice and two books: the 64-page Expert Set rule book and the 32-page (with an outer folder) module Isle of Dread.

The 10th Anniversary Dungeons & Dragons Collector's Set boxed set, which was published by TSR in 1984, contained the rulebooks from the Basic, Expert, and Companion sets; as well as the modules AC2, AC3, B1, B2, and M1, Blizzard Pass; the Player Character Record Sheets; and dice; this set was limited to only 1,000 copies, and was sold both by mail and at GenCon 17.

== Contents ==
The Expert Set consists of one rulebook and an adventure module, X1-The Isle of Dread. The Expert Set rulebook presents rules for characters of level 4–14, and begins with an introduction to wilderness adventures and playing a long-term campaign.

The rulebook is then divided into a Player's section and a Dungeon Master's section. The Player's section introduces rules for adventuring in the wilderness, as well as new weapons and equipment. It expands the spell lists for the cleric and magic-user classes, and introduces the concept of "reversed spells" (in which some spells may be cast with a result opposite to their normal effect). Because of their special abilities, the three demi-human classes are given maximum levels "to help keep all the character classes in balance": dwarves, elves, and halflings can only rise to 12th, 10th, and 8th level, respectively. When any character reaches a specified "Name" level, depending on their class, they are permitted to build a stronghold, and thus attract lower-level NPC followers.

The bulk of the Dungeon Master's section provides details for creating and running both wilderness adventures and a long-term campaign, including designing the home town and area of player's characters, and combat rules for various wilderness terrain. The Grand Duchy of Karameikos is presented as a sample wilderness adventure area. The lists of magical items and monsters are also expanded.

Players who want to continue expansion on their characters would continue to the Companion Set.

== Reception ==
Aaron Allston reviewed the original Expert Set in The Space Gamer No. 38. He commented on its place with the Basic D&D series, saying that "Overall, the Basic series is a good set of rules, but only as a series. A beginning gamer will find Basic D&D well-organized and playable, but so limited as to soon grow pale and vapid. With Expert, the scope is increased to acceptable levels, with rules for adventuring beyond the dungeon – wilderness, aerial, naval, the world at large – but this doubles the investment required." Allston also commented that "Expert D&D is practically valueless outside the series. It duplicated materials in Original D&D and AD&D, and breaks no new ground. Its use with other RPGs is questionable, except for the section on castlebuilding, which few other games handle in detail. It is, however, well-arranged and invaluable in the context of the series."

Anders Swenson and Douglas Law reviewed the Dungeons & Dragons Basic Set and Dungeons & Dragons Expert Set for Different Worlds magazine and stated that "The new D&D Basic and Expert Sets should be a smooth introduction to the hobby of adventure-game playing for vast numbers of new players and an enjoyable addition to the libraries of experienced players. We recommend this version of the game over the previous editions, especially for beginners, because it is clearer, better organized, and more refined."

Chris Hunter reviewed the 1983 edition for Imagine magazine, giving it a positive review. He thought that, unlike the Basic Set, this was more of a re-organization and re-editing of the original material.
