= List of Advanced Dungeons & Dragons 2nd edition monsters =

Monsters are an important element of Advanced Dungeons & Dragons 2nd edition, a role-playing game. The ones listed here are only those from official Advanced Dungeons & Dragons 2nd Edition supplements published by TSR, Inc. or Wizards of the Coast, not licensed or unlicensed third-party products such as video games or unlicensed Advanced Dungeons & Dragons 2nd Edition manuals.

== Monsters in the 2nd edition Advanced Dungeons & Dragons ==
The second edition of the Advanced Dungeons & Dragons game features both a higher number of books of monsters (Note: The individual books are listed below)—"many tied to their growing stable of campaign worlds"—and more extensive monster descriptions than both earlier and later editions, with usually one page in length. Next to a description, monster entries in this edition contained standardized sections covering combat, their habit and society, and their role in the eco-system. While later editions gave the various creatures all the attributes which player characters had, 2nd edition only listed intelligence, a characteristic important for creating challenging encounters in the game.

The 2nd edition also uses a unique format in the form of Monstrous Compendiums of loose sheets that could be collected in a folder, allowing for a combination of monster books together with individual monster pages from boxed sets. This "unruly" format was abandoned again in 1993 in favor of bound books. In parallel with this change, the 2nd edition introduced colored images for each monster, which became standard in later editions of the game. Referencing Wizards of the Coast art director Dawn Murin, GameSpy author Allan Rausch found that until the 2nd edition the artwork depicting monsters was influenced by the popular culture of the late 1970s. As a result, creatures that were fearsome by description were not taken seriously due to ill-suited visuals. Likewise, humanoid monsters too closely resembled humans to be compelling. In the view of Rausch as well as Backstab reviewer Michaël Croitoriu, the Planescape setting marked a turning point for these shortcomings, which also had a significant impact on the presentation of the 3rd edition.

The second edition's monsters were based on original inventions, fantasy literature, and mythologies from various cultures. Many monsters were updated from earlier editions, but the 2nd edition also introduced a great number of new creatures.

Some types, such as devils and demons, were initially removed by TSR in response to a moral panic promoted by Patricia Pulling's advocacy group Bothered About Dungeons and Dragons (BADD). These were later reintroduced, sometimes with different names to avoid complaints.

== TSR 2102 – MC1 – Monstrous Compendium Volume One (1989) ==
This was the initial volume in the Monstrous Compendium series, for the second edition of the Advanced Dungeons & Dragons game, published in 1989. Most of the monsters for Volume One were taken from previous first edition AD&D books; the monster entries were greatly expanded and in most cases each monster now filled an entire page and had an all-new illustration. The Monstrous Compendium series consisted of a pack of 5-hole-punched loose-leaf pages rather than an actual book, designed to be arranged to the player's preference. Volume One of the Monstrous Compendium was packaged in a box, which contained the pack of monster sheets as well as a binder intended to store the sheets for Volumes One, Two, and Three. The pack consisted of 144 pages, unnumbered, and included a "How To Use This Book" page, with an alphabetical index to Volume One on the back, four pages of monster summoning and random encounter charts, and a blank monster sheet to be photocopied, with the remainder consisting of the monster descriptions. Also included were eight full-page illustrations on heavier card stock.

- Note: All monsters from MC1 appeared in the Monstrous Manual (1993), though some had slightly altered headings.

TSR 2102 – MC1 – Monstrous Compendium Volume One (1989) – ISBN 0-88038-738-6
Creature	Other appearances	Variants	Description
Aerial servant	Monster Manual (1977), Guide to the Ethereal Plane (1998)		A form of invisible air kin elemental that can be summoned by a cleric; it is very strong and usually attacks by strangling an opponent
Animal, herd		Camel, Cattle, Buffalo, Antelope, and Sheep	
Bat		Common, Large (Giant), and Huge Bat (mobat)	The giant bat is exactly what its name would suggest—a giant form of bat with a 6' wingspan. White Dwarf reviewer Jamie Thomson commented on the giant bat, noting that it "seems an obvious choice for D&D". Animal studies scholar Matthew Chrulew saw bats as a typical fauna part of the game's "dungeon ecology".
Bear	Monster Manual (1977) (Black, brown, cave bear), Monster Manual II (1983) (Polar bear as Northern bear)	Black, Brown, Cave and Polar	
Behir	The Lost Caverns of Tsojcanth (1982), Monster Manual II (1983), Monster Manual (2000), Monster Manual (2003)		A snake-like reptilian monster which can move quickly and climb thanks to its dozen legs; it can discharge a stroke of lightning, squeeze opponents with its long body, and swallow creatures whole
Beholder	Supplement I: Greyhawk (1975), Monster Manual (1977), Spelljammer: AD&D Adventures In Space (1989), Monster Manual (2000), Monster Manual (2003), Monster Manual (2008)		A large orb protected by chitinous plates, dominated by a central eye and a large toothy maw, with 10 smaller eyes on stalks sprouting from the top of the orb; the large eye negates all magic nearby, and the smaller eyes cause a variety of magical effects. Described as a "creature that looks at you and is destroying you by the power of its magical eyes". A terrible beast, but depicted as "a cuddly rosy ball with too many eyes". The beholder is designed to counter magic-using characters while being a formidable opponent for a whole party due to its versatility. Considered one of "the game's signature monsters" by Philip J. Clements. A "classic" "iconic", as well as "one of the most feared and fearsome monsters of the game", present through all editions.
Boar		Wild Boar, Giant Boar (Elothere) and Warthog	
Bookworm	Monster Manual II (1983)		A worm that inhabits libraries and eats books, it can change its normal gray color to match its surroundings
Brownie	Monster Manual (1977)		Based on the creature from Scottish folklore, the brownie in the game is described as a 2-foot-tall (0.61 m), benign humanoid relative of the halfling that is difficult to surprise, and can blend into its surroundings. It was written up as a player character race in White Dwarf no. 29 (Feb. 1982) for AD&D 1st Edition by Bob Lock in 1982.
Bugbear	Supplement I: Greyhawk (1975), Monster Manual (1977), Monster Manual (2000), Monster Manual (2003), Monster Manual (2008)		A 7-foot-tall (2.1 m), hairy cousin of the goblin, for the most part presented as inherently evil before the 5th edition of the game, with a nose like that of a bear, which prefer to attack foes by ambush
Carrion crawler	Supplement I: Greyhawk (1975), Monster Manual (1977), Monster Manual (2000), Monster Manual (2003), Monster Manual (2008)		A worm-like cephalopod that scavenges subterranean areas, feeding primarily upon carrion, whose tentacles paralyze creatures. The carrion crawler was included in the short list of monsters which were included in the core product identity and protected from use by other companies in the System Reference Document.
Catoblepas	Strategic Review v2 no. 2 (1976), Supplement III: Eldritch Wizardry (1976), Monster Manual (1977), Monster Manual II (2002)		Based on the legendary creature from Aethiopia described by Pliny, a bizarre creature that inhabits swamps, the large bloodshot eyes of its unusually heavy head emanate a ray that causes other creatures to simply die. David M. Ewalt described it as "an overweight buffalo with stumpy legs, a giraffe-like neck, and a warthog's head". An "old personal favorite" of reviewer Mark Theurer, Black Gate editor Howard Andrew Jones remarked on their presence throughout the game's history.
Cats, great	Monster Manual (1977) (Giant Lynx)	Cheetah, Jaguar, Leopard, Common Lion, Mountain Lion, Spotted Lion, Giant Lynx, Wild Tiger and Smilodon	Chrulew observed that in contrast to more harmless animals the game dedicated space to lions as creatures which "are, indeed, monstrous in the powerful, predatory sense" and among "the most Nietzschean of animals".
Cave fisher	In the Dungeons of the Slave Lords (1981), Monster Manual II (1983), Dragon no. 355 (May 2007)		A large insectoid with characteristics of a spider and lobster, it catches foes with its sticky filament by firing it from a distance
Centaur, sylvan	Dungeons & Dragons set (1974), Monster Manual (1977), Monster Manual (2000), Monster Manual (2003)		A woodland being with the upper half of a human and the lower body of a large powerful horse, it is a sociable tribal creature. Based on the creature from Greek mythology. Also made available as player characters, where compared to human characters their "extra limbs [...] are to be envied".
Centipede		Giant centipede, Huge centipede and Megalocentipede	Giant centipedes are "low-level monsters"; one-foot-long, red, many-legged creatures, monstrous versions of natural animals. Chrulew observed that "monstrous centipedes" and other vermin "figure the abject and excluded", representing "most clearly a bare life [as coined by Giorgio Agamben] that may be killed without hesitation; violence against such wholly other creatures is completely deproblematized."
Chimera	Dungeons & Dragons set (1974), Monster Manual (1977), Monster Manual (2000), Monster Manual (2003), Monster Manual (2008), Monster Manual (2014)	Chimera and Gorgimera	The chimera is based on the chimera of Greek mythology as found in the Iliad by Homer, "stronger than a centaur but weaker than a sphinx", it is described as an evil-aligned creature which looks like a lion with leathery wings on its back. To either side of its lion's head is the head of a goat and the head of a dragon. Present in the game since the earliest edition. Classical reception scholar Liz Gloyn observed that role-playing games like D&D for many persons are the medium where they come into contact with classical monsters like the chimera the first time, usually as adversaries to overcome, but adapted to the needs of a fantasy story rather than staying close to the Mediterranean context of the myth. The gorgimera variant of the game is the result of a union between a chimera and gorgon with the goat parts replaced with the gorgon parts.
Cockatrice	Supplement III: Eldritch Wizardry (1976), Monster Manual (1977), Monster Manual (2000), Monster Manual (2003)	Cockatrice and Pyrolisk	Based on the creature from medieval bestiaries.
Couatl	Supplement III: Eldritch Wizardry (1976), Monster Manual (1977), Monster Manual (2000), Monster Manual (2003)		A 12-foot-long (3.7 m) feathered serpent native to jungle regions, of lawful good alignment, with great magical and psionic power. Based on the supernatural entity from Mesoamerican religion known as Quetzalcoatl in Aztec culture.
Displacer beast	Supplement I: Greyhawk (1975), Monster Manual (1977), Monster Manual (2000), Monster Manual (2003), Monster Manual (2008)		A magical creature resembling a puma with a tentacle growing from each shoulder, it hates all forms of life, and always appears 3 feet from its actual position. Based on the alien Coeurl from the short story Black Destroyer by A. E. van Vogt. David M. Ewalt, in his book Of Dice and Men, discussed several monsters appearing in the original Monster Manual, describing displacer beasts as looking like "pumas with thorn-covered tentacles growing out of their shoulders". Rob Bricken from io9 named the displacer beast as the 2nd most memorable D&D monster.
Dogs		Wild, War, Blink and Death Dogs	White Dwarf reviewer Jamie Thomson commented on the death dog, which is "rumored to be a descendant of Cerberus".
Dragon			Powerful and intelligent, usually winged reptiles with magical abilities and breath weapon inspired mainly by their counterparts from European folklore. The different subraces, distinguished by their colouring, vary in power. The dragon has been referred to as the "iconic creature for D&D adventurers to conquer". They are grouped into the good-aligned "metallic" and evil "chromatic" dragons.
-- Dragon, Black	Dungeons & Dragons set (1974), D&D Basic set (1977, 1981, 1983), Monster Manual (1977), D&D Companion Rules (1984), Dungeons & Dragons Rules Cyclopedia (1991), Monster Manual (2000), Monster Manual v.3.5 (2003), D&D Miniatures: Dragoneye set #44 (2004), D&D Icons: Gargantuan Black Dragon (2006), D&D Miniatures: Unhallowed set #55 (2007)		Evil chaotic-aligned dragons that spit acid. They have horns projecting forward, a long body and thin tail.
-- Dragon, Blue	Dungeons & Dragons set (1974), Monster Manual (1977), D&D Basic set (1981, 1983), D&D Companion Rules (1984), Dungeons & Dragons Rules Cyclopedia (1991), Monster Manual (2000), Monster Manual v.3.5 (2003), D&D Miniatures: Deathknell set #38 (2005), D&D Icons: Gargantuan Blue Dragon (2007)		Evil lawful-aligned dragons that discharge a bolt of lightning. They have a distinctive horn on their snout.
-- Dragon, Brass	Greyhawk set (1974), Monster Manual (1977), D&D Basic set (1997), Monster Manual (2000), Monster Manual v.3.5 (2003), D&D Miniatures: Dragoneye set #14 (2004), D&D Miniatures: Unhallowed set #19 (2007)		Benevolent and talkative good-aligned desert-dwelling dragons that can breathe sleep gas or fear-causing gas. An example of content misrepresented by the game's detractors.
-- Dragon, Bronze	Greyhawk set (1974), Monster Manual (1977), Monster Manual (2000), Monster Manual v.3.5 (2003), D&D Miniatures: War Drums set #7 (2006)		Good and lawful-aligned dragons that breathe a bolt of lightning or a repulsion gas cloud.
-- Dragon, Copper	Greyhawk set (1974), Monster Manual (1977), Monster Manual (2000), Monster Manual v.3.5 (2003), D&D Miniatures: Angelfire set #21 (2005), D&D Miniatures: Desert of Desolation #23 (2007)		Good and chaotic-aligned dragons that breathe a discharge of acid or a cloud of gas that slows creatures.
-- Dragon, Gold	Dungeons & Dragons set (1974), Monster Manual (1977), D&D Basic set (1981, 1983), D&D Companion Rules (1984), Dungeons & Dragons Rules Cyclopedia (1991), Monster Manual (2000), Monster Manual v.3.5 (2003), D&D Miniatures: Giants of Legend set #61 (2004), D&D Miniatures: Deathknell set #7 (2005)		Good and lawful-aligned dragons that breathe fire or chlorine gas. In contrast to other dragons in the game, they are inspired by their counterparts from Chinese mythology.
-- Dragon, Green	Dungeons & Dragons set (1974), Monster Manual (1977), D&D Basic set (1981, 1983), D&D Companion Rules (1984), Dungeons & Dragons Rules Cyclopedia (1991), Monster Manual (2000), Monster Manual v.3.5 (2003). D&D Miniatures: War of the Dragon Queen set #38 (2005)		Evil lawful-aligned dragons that breathe a cloud of poisonous chlorine gas.
-- Dragon, Red	Dungeons & Dragons set (1974), D&D Basic set (1977, 1981, 1983), Monster Manual (1977), D&D Companion Rules (1984), Dragon no. 134 "The Ecology of the Red Dragon" (1988), Dungeons & Dragons Rules Cyclopedia (1991), Monster Manual (2000), Monster Manual v.3.5 (2003), D&D Miniatures: Dragoneye set #55 (2004), D&D Miniatures: Giants of Legend set #71 (2004), D&D Icons: Colossal Red Dragon (2006)		Evil chaotic-aligned dragons that breathe a cone of fire. According to Dant et al. "one of the most fearsome and classic monsters" in role-playing games.
-- Dragon, Silver	Greyhawk set (1974), Monster Manual (1977), Monster Manual (2000), Monster Manual v.3.5 (2003), D&D Miniatures: Archfiends set #5 (2004)		Good and lawful-aligned dragons that breathe a cone of frost or a cloud of paralyzing gas.
-- Dragon, White	Dungeons & Dragons set (1974), D&D Basic set (1977, 1981, 1983), Monster Manual (1977), D&D Companion Rules (1984), Dungeons & Dragons Rules Cyclopedia (1991), Monster Manual (2000), Monster Manual v.3.5 (2003), D&D Miniatures: Night Below #58 (2007), D&D Icons: Legend of Drizzt Scenario Pack (2007) ("Icingdeath, Gargantuan White Dragon")		Evil chaotic-aligned dragons that breathe a cone of cold.
Dragon turtle			Present in the game since its inception.
Dragonfish			
Elemental		Air, Earth, Fire and Water Elementals	Powerful creatures in the game made up of their respective element, with some "vagueness of form", which may provide more mobility in situations of danger; a characteristic of the air elemental is the ability of rapid movement.
Elephant		African elephant, Mammoth, Mastodon and Oliphant	
Elf		High elf, Grey elf (Faerie), Wood elf, Half-elf	Based on Tolkien's version of the elf, "quick but fragile", with senses surpassing a human's, often depicted as "effeminate" and "predisposed towards a "good" moral alignment". Aardy R. DeVarque observed that while D&D's half-elves are inspired by the character of Elrond, they are distinct by being "a true amalgamation of elves and men."
Genie	Monster Manual (1977) (Djinn, efreet), Al-Qadim – Land of Fate	Djinn, Dao and Efreeti	Based on notions from Middle Eastern culture, genies in the game are powerful elemental spirits from the Inner Planes, each of the four classical elements having its own subspecies of genie: djinn for air, dao for earth, efreet for fire. The djinn and efreet have namesakes from Arabic folklore also associated with air and fire, respectively. A depiction of an "evil [...] efreet" already appeared in the original Dungeons & Dragons (1974) edition, another "enormous, devilish red" one was the main feature of the cover of the 1st edition Dungeon Master's Guide. Within the game's cosmology they were based on the Plane of Fire, centered around the "fabled City of Brass". They feature especially in the Al-Qadim setting. AD&D's djinn were also adapted into the Magic: The Gathering trading card game, with a depiction taken from the Monster Manual being used in a prototype version.
Ghost			Inspired by Gothic fiction, a typical denizen of the Ravenloft setting. Their touch causes the victim to age rapidly.
Ghoul	Monster Manual (1977)	Ghoul, Lacedon and Ghast	Undead with "terrible claws", known for "their taste for corpses". A ghast is basically "a stronger version of D&D ghouls", exuding a nauseating stench.
Giant		Cloud, Fire, Frost, Hill, Stone and Storm Giant	Overlarge powerful humanoids with a self-involved social focus, usually presented as the "bad guys". Based on mythological figures and Tolkien, their stone-throwing ability indicates their creative roots in wargaming.
Gnoll		Gnoll and Flind	Vicious humanoids with hyena-like heads. Richard W. Forest assumed them to be inspired from but not resembling the gnoles conceived by Lord Dunsany, while Gary Gygax himself stated that although Dunsany's "gnole" is close", he came up with the name as "a cross between a gnome and a troll", and the description was his original creation. He wanted to create a humanoid opponent in the game to fit in between the hobgoblin and bugbear in power. Gnolls were considered one of the "five main "humanoid" races" in AD&D by Paul Karczag and Lawrence Schick.
Gnome			Player character race "often stereotyped as buffoons, illusionists, mad inventors, and many characters play them as intentionally "wacky" or anachronistic"; often conforms to the trickster archetype. "predisposed towards a "good" moral alignment".
Goblin			Based primarily on the goblins portrayed in J.R.R. Tolkien's Middle-Earth. Considered one of the "five main "humanoid" races" in AD&D by Paul Karczag and Lawrence Schick. Presented as "evil" and "predisposed towards a society of brutal regimes where the strongest rule" in the game. Suitable opponent for characters of lowest level.
Golem, lesser	Strategic Review no. 4 (Clay)	Flesh and Clay	The clay golem is based on the golem of Medieval Jewish folklore, though changed from "a cherished defender to an unthinking hulk" while the flesh golem is related to Frankenstein's monster as Universal's 1931 film, seen in e.g. being empowered by electricity, as well as Gothic fiction more generally; a "classic" monster of the game. Jon Garrad, in the book Mary Shelley's Frankenstein, 1818–2018 (2020), criticized the original flesh golem in Advanced Dungeons and Dragons as "superficial" and "simplified" compared to its Frankenstein (1818) inspiration. However, Garrad argued that the 1990 Ravenloft iteration "partially rehabilitates the Frankenstein Creature", noting "Adam Mordenheim represents a step up from the Karloffian imitation in standard AD&D, back towards the pursuing threat of the novel, but this detail and depth is not grounded in any context or interaction". The influence of Dungeons & Dragons has led to the inclusion of golems in other tabletop role-playing as well as in video games.
Golem, greater		Stone and Iron	Inspired by Gothic fiction, a typical denizen of the Ravenloft setting, and "classic" monster of the game. Aardy DeVarque speculated the iron golem may have been inspired by the story of Talos from Greek mythology as well as Ray Harryhausen's interpretation in the Jason and the Argonauts movie.
Halfling		Hairfoot, Tallfellow and Stout	Based on the hobbit in J.R.R. Tolkien's works. The hobbit first appeared as a player character class in the original 1974 edition of Dungeons & Dragons. Later the game began using the name "halfling" as an alternative to "hobbit" for legal reasons. The "halfling" appeared as a player character race in the original Player's Handbook (1978).
Harpy			Based on the creature from Greek mythology. Witwer et al. viewed its artistic rendering in 5th edition as "redesigned from prior editions to entice more Dungeon Master use."
Hobgoblin	Monster Manual (2003), Mordenkainen Presents: Monsters of the Multiverse (2022)	Koalinth	While the name hobgoblin appears in English folklore as well as Tolkien's The Hobbit, their appearance in the game seems largely an original creation "by TSR's writers, serving as a sort of tougher-than-normal goblin": Muscular humanoids somewhat taller than humans with reddish skin and canine teeth, hobgoblins have usually been described as a militaristic culture. Mordenkainen Presents: Monsters of the Multiverse gave them a new background as a species originating in and expelled from the Feywild, while also presenting hobgoblins societies with different characteristics on different worlds, but all centered around forming close-knit groups. Koalinth are an undersea variation. Reviewer Declan Lowthian included them among the "15 Best Monsters For Coastal D&D Adventures", because the provide a more organized and tactical opponent than most other coastal creatures of the game, and also could be negotiated with rather than providing purely combat encounters.
Homonculous			Adapted from the concept of the articifically created "little man" appearing in alchemical writings.
Hornet, giant		Hornet and Wasp	Monstrous versions of natural animals.
Horse		Draft horse, Heavy Warhorse, Medium Warhorse, Light Warhorse, Pony, Wild horse, Riding horse and Mule	Relevant as mounts for player characters, for some of which expert riding may become a specialization, Chrulew also identified horses as a case of "a distinctly zoophilic emphasis on the development of human/animal relationships" of the game.
Hydra	Monster Manual (1977)	Hydra, Lernaean Hydra, Pyrohydra and Cryohydra	Based on the creature from classical sources, with Heracles' famed method of slaying it adapted into a vulnerability against fire, but not with the less well-known venomous bite, showing how the game mostly focusses on the well-known traits of mythological creatures. Present in the game since its inception. Aardy R. DeVarque speculated that the monster was given a "dragon-like breath weapon [which] could keep sword-wielding fighters at a distance" in the variants of cryo- and pyrohydra to create an even more formidable opponent. AD&D's hydra was also adapted into the Magic: The Gathering trading card game, with a depiction taken from the Monster Manual being used in a prototype version.
Hyena		Hyena and Hyaenodon	
Imp	Planescape Monstrous Compendium Appendix (1994)	Imp and Quasit	Minor fiends which could be created from larvae. Reviewer Philippe Tessier found the quasit "very nice" and interesting when made available as a familiar.
Invisible stalker			
Jackal			
Jackalwere	Monster Manual (1977), Monstrous Manual (1993)		An intelligent jackal with the ability to assume human and jackal-human-hybrid form and a sleep-inducing gaze. Lucas Olah of TheGamer said of the Jackalwere, "They also come with the fun little twist of being regular animals who were transformed rather than the regular lycanthropy." Tallis Spalding of TheGamer wrote, "The Jackalwere is an interesting monster because they aren't all that malicious if your party is aware of their presence since they can give them an offering for passing through their territory. However, if your party opts not to provide a gift or treasure for passing through, they can pull any number of tricks." Reviewer Daniel D'Agostino counted the jackalwere among the "exotic creatures" in the game and remarked upon its appearance in the computer game Ravenloft: Stone Prophet, where it unusually is a non-player character willing to join the hero party.
Kobold			"[S]hort subterranean lizard-men", considered one of the "five main 'humanoid' races" in AD&D by Paul Karczag and Lawrence Schick, and ranked among the weakest monsters in the game by Scott Baird from Screen Rant.
Korred			Based on the korred from Breton mythology.
Lich	Demilich: The Lost Caverns of Tsojcanth (1982), Monster Manual II (1983), Epic Level Handbook (2002), Monster Manual (2014)	Lich and Demilich	Lich: Emaciated undead spellcaster, a "classic" monster of the game. Demilich: Evolved beyond status as a lich. Creature of enormous powers, where only the skull remains. Tyler Linn of Cracked.com identified the demi-lich as one of "15 Idiotic Dungeons and Dragons Monsters" in 2009, stating: "Besides looking like a Pirates of the Caribbean alarm clock, the Demi-lich seems to possess no tactical advantages of any kind. It just kind of floats around, waiting for a party of heroes to smack it out of the air like a pinata. We suppose it could try to bite you, but the illustration above kind of makes it look like the jaw is fused in place. Man, now we just feel sorry for it." Ranked among the strongest in Screen Rant's "10 Most Powerful (And 10 Weakest) Monsters, Ranked", saying "You might think that a floating skull would be easy to smash to pieces, but you would be wrong, as demiliches are some of the most resilient creatures in the game."
Lizard		Fire, Giant, Minotaur and Subterranean lizards	
Lizard man	Greyhawk, Monster Manual (1977), Fiend Folio (1981), Dungeons & Dragons Basic Set, Dungeons & Dragons Game, Dungeons & Dragons Rules Cyclopedia (1991), Classic Dungeons & Dragons Game (1994), Dungeons & Dragons Adventure Game (1999), Hollow World Campaign Set, Dragonlance Monstrous Compendium, The Complete Spacefarer's Handbook, The Complete Book of Humanoids, Player's Option: Skills & Powers, Mind Lords of the Last Sea, Polyhedron no. 121 (1996), Monster Manual (2000) (from here on as lizardfolk), Races of Faerûn, Monster Manual (2003), Dragon no. 318 (2004), Serpent Kingdoms, Eberron Campaign Setting, Monster Manual III (2004), Dragon no. 335 (2005), Monster Manual IV (2006), Monster Manual (2008), Monster Vault: Threats to the Nentir Vale, Monster Manual (2014), Volo's Guide to Monsters	Lizard Man, Lizard King	Lizardfolk are primitive reptilian humanoids typically standing from six to seven feet tall. A player character race in some settings. Reviewer Chris Gigoux described them by saying "Lizard Men aren't bad, [...] they're just a simple folks, struggling to survive." In 2020, Comic Book Resources counted the lizardfolk as # 1 on the list of "10 Powerful Monster Species That You Should Play As", stating that "Along with the ability to manufacture their own weapons from the natural environment around them, they provide an excellent role-playing experience and have some pretty awesome tricks up their sleeve." Scholar of speculative fiction Nicolas B. Clark saw the lizardfolk as "the perfect encapsulation" for a wider trend in Western culture where reptilian creatures in fiction were depicted as "cold, emotionless, alien". He highlighted "their singular focus on survival as a core value and general indifference" as central traits which provide a unique role-playing challenge for lizardfolk as player characters. Their described manner of speech and lack of understanding of metaphors deepened their impression as persons "bound to the material world, and lacking in imagination" which in turn imply the lack of "a distinct sense of identity or personhood". Clark thus sees D&D's lizardfolk as "poor in the world", as Heidegger has described animals' lack of awareness and agency, in contrast to the "world-forming" ability humans possess. An image of a lizard man by Greg Bell functioned as the logo in the early phase of TSR Hobbies, while "the bloodied bodies of lizard men" overcome by a group of adventurers featured on the cover of the 1st edition Player's Handbook, considered "arguably the most iconic piece of art in all of RPGdom" by Reactor magazine commentator Saladin Ahmed.
Lycanthrope	Werewolf: Dungeons & Dragons "white box" set (1974), Monster Manual (1977), Dragon, Dungeons & Dragons Basic Set (1977, 1981, 1983), Dungeons & Dragons Rules Cyclopedia (1991), Night Howlers (1992), Monster Manual (2000), Monster Manual (2003), Dragon no. 313, Monster Manual (2008)	Werebear, Wererat, Lesser and greater Seawolf, Weretiger and Werewolf	Afflicted shapechangers, whose condition could be transmitted like a disease. While a "[t]raditional monster" with "the connotation of 'man' degraded into 'beast,'" depiction of the werewolf in the game is related to those in 1930s and 1940s Hollywood movies like The Wolf Man.
Manticore			Based on its mythological counterpart, including the barbed tail, the manticore appeared in the game from its earliest edition.
Medusa		Normal and Greater	Based on the creature from classical sources but translated into species of monsters originated from "humans seeking eternal youth". Reviewer Allan Rausch found their portrayal as "a woman with snakes for hair" up to 2nd edition less compelling than their less human-like depiction in 3rd edition. Part of the game from its very beginning, a medusa was already depicted in the playtest material from 1973 for the original edition.
Men		Aborigines/Cavemen, Adventurers, Bandits/Brigands, Barbarians/Nomads, Berserkers/Dervishes, Farmers/Herders, Gentry, Knights, Mercenary Soldiers, Merchant Sailors/Fishermen, Merchants/Traders, Middle Class, Peasantry (serfs), Pilgrims, Pirates/Buccaneers, Police/Constabulary, Priests, Sailors, Slavers, Soldiers, Thieves/Thugs, Tradesmen/Craftsmen, Tribesmen, and Wizards	Human variants. The game aims to present humans with the same diversity found in the real world and more, but in most cases they are statistically comparatively homogeneous, and depictions have often suffered from Eurocentrism. As the players are humans, in the game humans are the standard against which other playable races are compared, and often promoted "as the best or most versatile characters", while up to 2nd edition AD&D class restrictions for non-humans guided choices "always in favor of...bland humanity." Chrulew observed that through the plethora of sentient species present in the game, humans here lose their uniqueness of "speech, technology, politics, agency and so on". Berserkers are based on the berserkir, "men of Odin, whom the god made strong like wild beasts", from Icelandic sagas and Snorri Sturluson's history of the kings of Norway. Gus Wezerek, for FiveThirtyEight, reported that of the 5th Edition "class and race combinations per 100,000 characters that players created on D&D Beyond from" August 15 to September 15, 2017, humans were the most created at 25,248 total. The three most popular class combinations with the human were Fighter (4,888), Wizard (2,568), and Rogue (2,542). Wezerek noted "some of the common character choices can be explained by the game's structure of racial bonuses".
Mind flayer	Strategic Review no. 1		Also known as illithids, these "Squid-headed humanoids" were considered one of "the game's signature monsters" by Philip J. Clements. Reviewer Julien Blondel described them as vile brain-eating creatures full of psionic energy. He found them delightful creatures for a sadistic Dungeon Master to use, and a useful bridge between classic game worlds and the planes, as illithids abound in both.
Minotaur	Dungeons & Dragons (1974), Monster Manual (1977)		Based on the creature from Greek mythology, but translated from a singular creature into a species. In 2021, Comic Book Resources counted the minotaur as one of the "7 Underused Monster Races in Dungeons & Dragons", stating that "far from just brutal monsters. Many are lawful by nature, which means, surprisingly, Minotaurs make for some good Paladins. They also, obviously, make for some good Barbarians, Monks and Fighters. There's a lot of potential with Minotaurs. People hate and fear them, but you might be able to play that to your advantage...or fight against the stereotypes." The minotaur was among the monsters featured as trading cards on the back of Amurol Products candy figure boxes. AD&D's minotaurs were also adapted into the Magic: The Gathering trading card game, with a depiction taken from the Monster Manual being used in a prototype version.
Mud-man			Screen Rant compiled a list of the game's "10 Most Powerful (And 10 Weakest) Monsters, Ranked" in 2018, calling this one of the weakest, saying "The mudmen are magically bound to their pool of mud, which means that the only way they can defeat an enemy is if they walk right into the middle of a dirty puddle. They will then have to score numerous hits in order to prevent the enemy from running away."
Mummy			Powerful undead usually from desert areas, wrapped in bandages. Based on the creature from Gothic fiction and appearances in more contemporary entertainment, a typical denizen of the Ravenloft setting. In his review of the Monster Manual in the British magazine White Dwarf no. 8 (August/September 1978), Don Turnbull noted that the mummy was revised from its previous statistics, and could now cause paralysis on sight (as a result of fear).
Nixie			
Nymph			Based on the nymph from Greek mythology, also an instance of the sexist tropes the game draws on which presented female sexuality as inherently dangerous. Appeared in the movie Futurama: Bender's Game.
Ogre		Ogre, Ogre mage and Merrow	Large, powerful humanoid creatures, with slightly below average intelligence. Typical bad guys in the game, who can be used to teach "players about fighting big, powerful, stupid monsters, which is an iconic D&D experience".
Oozes/slimes/jellies		Ochre Jelly, Gray Ooze, Crystal Ooze, Gelatinous cube and Green Slime	"D&D's large variety of monstrous oozes and slimes took their original inspiration from Irvin S. Yeathworth Jr's The Blob" film, and are characterized by some "vagueness of form", which may provide more mobility in situations of danger. In the artificial dungeon environment of the game, they function as a "clean up crew". Chrulew considered slimes typical flora within the game's "dungeon ecology". The gelatinous cube, "a living mound of gelatinous jelly", was considered especially suited for that role, as it fit exactly in the standard grid for tactical combat. Considered an "iconic monster". Ian Livingstone considered the ochre jelly one of the game's more "exotic and strange creatures". SyFy Wire contributor Lisa Granshaw counted oozes among "The 9 Scariest, Most Unforgettable Monsters From Dungeons & Dragons" and found them "extremely disturbing because everything may seem fine one minute and then the next you're on the way to death." D&D's slimes have served as inspiration for appearances of this kind of monster in many video games.
Orc		Orc and Orog	Directly adapted from the orc in J.R.R. Tolkien's works. Considered one of the "five main "humanoid" races" in AD&D by Paul Karczag and Lawrence Schick. Presented as "evil" and "savage raiders" in the game.
Owl		Normal, Giant and Talking	
Owlbear			Newly created for the game early on inspired by a Hong Kong–made plastic toy, the owlbear was well-received as a useful and memorable monster.
Pegasus			Winged horse. Taken from Greek mythology, an example of the diverse cultures amalgamated into D&D. Part of the game from its very beginning, a pegasus was already depicted in the playtest material from 1973 for the original edition.
Piercer	Strategic Review no. 3		
Pseudodragon			"a miniature dragon that also has a tail stinger". Reviewer Philippe Tessier found it "very nice" and interesting when made available as a familiar.
Puddings, deadly		Black, White, Dun and Brown	"D&D's large variety of monstrous oozes and slimes took their original inspiration from Irvin S. Yeathworth Jr's The Blob" film.
Rakshasa	Strategic Review no. 3	Normal and Greater	Based on the creature from Hindu mythology. Humanoid fiends with tigerlike-features, Reactor magazine commentator Saladin Ahmed rated them as "ultimate badass monsters". He found a depiction sitting with pipe and smoking-jacket fitting on second thought, as the creature is so powerful it has no need to prove its dangerousness.
Rat		Common and Giant	Example of a monster posing little threat to the characters in the game, suitable for play at lowest level. Chrulew saw rats as a typical fauna part of the game's "dungeon ecology".
Ray		Manta, Pungi and Sting Rays, Ixitxachitl	
Remorhaz			
Satyr			Based on the satyr from classical sources. Chrulew observed that the satyrs' penchant for music elevates them to "exemplify cherished aspects of human and other-than-human life", where in many other legendary creatures a mixture of human and animalistic characteristics represents a descent into bestiality.
Scorpion		Large, Huge and Giant	Scorpions have the distinction of having been the very first combat encounter in the first playtest, run by Gary Gygax, of the original version of the game. Giant: Scorpion the size of a horse, its stinger carries a deadly poison.
Selkie			
Shadow			In his review of the Monster Manual in the British magazine White Dwarf no. 8 (August/September 1978), Don Turnbull noted his disappointment that the shadow is of the undead class and thus subject to a cleric's turn undead ability. Turnbull commented, "I used to enjoy seeing clerics vainly trying to turn what wouldn't turn, when Shadows were first met". Rob Bricken of io9 identified the shadow as one of "The 12 Most Obnoxious Dungeons & Dragons Monsters".
Skeleton	Dungeons & Dragons "white box" set (1974), Monster Manual (1977), Dragon no. 66, Monster Manual II (1983), Dragon no. 138, Dungeons & Dragons Basic Set (1977, 1981, 1983), Dungeons & Dragons Game set (1991), Dungeons & Dragons Rules Cyclopedia (1991), Dungeons & Dragons Adventure Game (1999), Monstrous Compendium Volume One, Ravenloft Monstrous Compendium Appendix III: Creatures of Darkness (1994), Monster Manual (2000), Monster Manual (2003), Libris Mortis: The Book of Undead, Monster Manual (2008)	Normal, Animal skeleton and Monster skeleton	Skeleton of a deceased creature animated as an undead. The skeleton was ranked second among the ten best low-level monsters by the authors of Dungeons & Dragons For Dummies: "introduces players to the special advantages and weaknesses of undead monsters". They also thank Ray Harryhausen for people knowing what fighting skeletons ought to look like. Screen Rant ranked the tiny skeleton one of the weakest D&D creatures, saying "[skeletons] go all the way down to Tiny-sized creatures, which means that it is possible for your party of adventurers to fight a group of skeletons that are the same size as action figures."
Skunk		Normal and Giant	
Snake		Constrictor (Normal and Giant), Poisonous (Normal and Giant), Giant Sea and Giant Spitting Snakes	Chrulew observed that in contrast to more harmless animals the game dedicated space to serpents as creatures which "are, indeed, monstrous in the powerful, predatory sense" and among "the most Nietzschean of animals".
Spectre			Inspired by Gothic fiction, a typical denizen of the Ravenloft setting.
Spider		Large, Huge, Giant, Giant Water, Giant Marine and Phase Spiders	Monstrous versions of natural animals; academics Greg Gillespie and Darren Crouse considered the "giant poisonous spider", possessing some intelligence, an "iconic early D&D monster". Chrulew observed that giant spiders and other vermin "figure the abject and excluded", representing "most clearly a bare life [as coined by Giorgio Agamben] that may be killed without hesitation; violence against such wholly other creatures is completely deproblematized." Phase spider: Arachnid as big as a medium-large dog that can shift between dimensions and bite with fangs of deadly poison.
Sprite			
Toad, giant		Giant, Fire, Ice and Poisonous Toads	
Treant			Based on the Ent by J. R. R. Tolkien and renamed due to copyright reasons.
Troll		Troll, Two-Headed Troll, Freshwater and Saltwater Scrag	Tall green-skinned evil gaunt humanoids. A characteristic denizen of AD&D worlds. Their appearance and powerful regenerative ability is taken from Three Hearts and Three Lions by Poul Anderson rather than from their mythological or Tolkienesque counterparts. Considered one of the "five main "humanoid" races" in AD&D by Paul Karczag and Lawrence Schick.
Umber hulk		Umber Hulk and Vodyanoi	They are a type of humanoid insect. They have long mandible arms with powerful claws. Anyone looking into their eyes can be driven mad. Present in the game since the earliest edition, and considered "a classic D&D monsters" by academics Greg Gillespie and Darren Crouse.
Unicorn			Based on the creature from medieval bestiaries. The Dungeons & Dragons animated series featured Uni the unicorn as well-received "mascot" and "cute animal sidekick".
Vampire			Depiction is related to those in 1930s and 1940s Hollywood Dracula movies, as well as folklore and Gothic fiction; a typical denizen of the Ravenloft setting and "classic" monster of the game.
Wight			Thin humanoid undead. Directly adapted from the barrow-wight in Tolkien's The Lord of the Rings, while the concept is inspired by Icelandic sagas. Rob Bricken of io9 identified the wight as one of "The 12 Most Obnoxious Dungeons & Dragons Monsters".
Will o'wisp			
Wolf		Wolf, Dire Wolf, Worg, Winter wolf	Worgs are giant wolves inspired by the wargs in the works of J.R.R. Tolkien; the name was changed for legal reasons, while both the word and concept ultimately go back to Old Norse idea of varg, which can refer to wolves in their violent aspect.
Wolfwere			A reverse of a werewolf, that transforms from a wolf to either a humanoid or a humanoid-wolf hybrid instead of from a human to a humanoid wolf.
Wraith			Inspired by Gothic fiction, a typical denizen of the Ravenloft setting.
Wyvern			Dragon-like in overall appearance, the wyvern features a serpentine head, wings, scales, but only two legs and no breath weapon. Its tail is equipped with a poisonous tail stinger.
Yeti			
Yuan-ti	Mordenkainen Presents: Monsters of the Multiverse		A species of "cult-like snake people" and among "D&D's most popular and iconic monsters". The types have been summarized by A.V. Club as "a human-eating snake, or human-snake hybrid eater of humans and snakes, or other human-snake hybrids."
Zombie		Common, Monster and Ju-Ju Zombie	An undead creature, based on the zombie from folklore as well as more contemporary entertainment. Chrulew observed that zombies, as well as other undead and vermin, "figure the abject and excluded", representing "most clearly a bare life [as coined by Giorgio Agamben] that may be killed without hesitation; violence against such wholly other creatures is completely deproblematized."

== TSR 2103 – MC2 – Monstrous Compendium Volume Two (1989) ==
This was the second volume in the Monstrous Compendium series, for the second edition of Advanced Dungeons & Dragons, published in 1989. As with Volume One, most of the monsters for Volume Two were taken from previous first edition AD&D books, with greatly expanded entries that now filled an entire page and had an all-new illustration. Volume Two was packaged in a wraparound cover, and the pages were designed to fit in the binder that came with Volume One of the Monstrous Compendium. The pack consisted of 144 pages, unnumbered, and included a 2-page alphabetical index to Volume One and Volume Two, 10 pages of monster summoning and random encounter charts, and a blank monster sheet to be photocopied with a sheet of instructions for the blank monster form, with the remainder consisting of the monster descriptions. Also included were 8 full-page illustrations on heavier card stock.

- Note: All monsters from MC2 appeared in the Monstrous Manual (1993), though some had slightly altered headings.

TSR 2103 – MC2 – Monstrous Compendium Volume Two (1989) – ISBN 0-88038-753-X
Creature	Other appearances	Variants	Description
Aarakocra	Mordenkainen Presents: Monsters of the Multiverse		Also available as a player character race, Comic Book Resources in 2020 counted the aarakocra as # 9 on the list of "10 Powerful Monster Species That You Should Play As", stating that "As long as they're not wearing heavy or medium armor you have a flying sniper, essentially." Gus Wezerek, for FiveThirtyEight, reported that of the 5th Edition "class and race combinations per 100,000 characters that players created on D&D Beyond from" August 15 to September 15, 2017, aarakocra were the twelfth most created at 3,868 total. The three most popular class combinations with the aarakocra were Monk (835), Ranger (572), and Rogue (362). Wezerek noted "some of the common character choices can be explained by the game's structure of racial bonuses".
Aboleth			Ancient and powerful aquatic beings, aboleth in the game use their telepathic powers to influence and enslave mortals from behind the scenes in their bid to restore the position of dominance they lost through the rise of the gods themselves. SyFy Wire contributor Lisa Granshaw included them in her 2018 list of "The 9 Scariest, Most Unforgettable Monsters From Dungeons & Dragons" due to their impressive abilities and vengefulness.
Ankheg			
Ant		Giant ant and Ant Swarm	
Ant lion, giant			Based on the real-world insect, but with gigantic proportions. Also hearkens back to a monstrous creatures appearing "in bestiaries, because of a linguistic misunderstanding pictured as a lion with the hind-quarters of a gigantic ant".
Ape, carnivorous			
Baboon		Wild Baboon and Banderlog	
Badger		Common and giant	
Barracuda			
Basilisk	Monster Manual (1977)	Lesser, greater and Dracolisk	Based on the creature from medieval bestiaries. In the original Monster Manual it is described as a reptilian monster whose gaze can turn creatures to stone. AD&D's basilisk was also adapted into the Magic: The Gathering trading card game, with a depiction taken from the Monster Manual being used in a prototype version.
Beetle		Bombardier, Boring, Fire, Rhinoceros, Stag and Water	
Bulette			Also called land shark, inspired by a plastic toy from Hong Kong marketed as dinosaurs; "the name and behavior were invented by Gygax." In his 2019 book The Monsters Know What They're Doing, author Keith Ammann called bulettes "brutes tailor-made to give your players jump scares" and found its preferences and aversions for the meat of different humanoid races "ludicrous".
Bullywug			
Crocodile		Normal and giant	
Crustacean, giant		Giant Crab and Giant Crayfish	
Dolphin			
Doppleganger			"Loosely derived from German philosophical folklore" where an encounter with look-a-like represents a different aspect of one's character, frequently an evil twin.
Dragonne	Monster Manual (1977)		Lion-headed dragon-like creature, it was "Originally described as 'a weird cross between a brass dragon and a giant lion'". Present "in every edition of the game", James Wyatt stated it was "probably the oldest manifestation in the game of the idea of a half-dragon". Renamed to liondrake in 5th edition.
Dryad			Based on the dryad from classical sources. The dryad appears as a player character class in Tall Tales of the Wee Folk in the "DM's booklet" (1989).
Dwarf		Hill and Mountain	Based on Tolkien's version of the dwarf. Often depicted as "short, stout, and fond of ale", "bearded masters of metalworking" and "predisposed towards a "good" moral alignment", "tend to embody an extreme vision of masculinity". Environmental humanities scholar Matthew Chrulew considered the dwarves division into subraces as an option "to customize a campaign, [...] based on relationship to place".
Dwarf, duergar		Duergar and Steeder (Giant Spider)	"the infamous dark dwarves", an "evil and avaricious" dwarven subrace with psionic powers. ComicBook.com contributor Christian Hoffer considered the struggle of the duergar with their dwarven cousins one "of the great conflicts that make up the D&D multiverse". Backstab reviewer Michaël Croitoriu found the duergar interesting as a player character option.
Eagle		Wild and giant	Chrulew observed that in contrast to more harmless animals the game dedicated space to eagles as creatures which "are, indeed, monstrous in the powerful, predatory sense" and among "the most Nietzschean of animals". The intelligent giant eagles appear to be adapted from the Eagles in Middle-earth.
Eel		Electric, Giant, Marine and Weed	
Elf, Drow		Drow and Drider	Made famous by R. A. Salvatore's Drizzt novels, these dark elves from the game influenced subsequent works of fantasy. Drow have a gender-based caste system that says "a great deal about attitudes towards gender roles in the real world". Bleeding Cool reviewer Gavin Sheehan considered "the schism between drow and other elves" one "of the most contentious relationships in the multiverse" of D&D. A drider is a "monster that looks like a centaur only with the bottom half of a spider instead of a horse."
Ettercap			
Ettin			
Fish, giant		Giant Catfish, Giant Gar and Giant Pike	
Frog		Giant, killer and poisonous	
Fungus	Strategic Review no. 3 (Shrieker)	Violet Fungus, Shrieker, Phycomid, Ascomoid and Gas Spore	Author Ben Woodard called D&D's fungi horrific in their variety, not only due to their poisonous nature but their creepy ability to move; Chrulew considered fungi typical flora within the game's "dungeon ecology". Scott Baird from Screen Rant ranked the man-sized shrieker among the weakest monsters in the game, at "the bottom of the mushroom monster food chain": They "can be used as cheap alarm systems for Underdark societies, but they possess no combat abilities of their own. The only thing a shrieker can do is shriek".
Galeb duhr			
Gargoyle	Monster Manual (1977)	Gargoyle and Margoyle	Based on French folklore, animated version of grotesque waterspout figures common at cathedrals. AD&D's gargoyle was adapted into the Magic: The Gathering trading card game, with a depiction taken from the Monster Manual being used in a prototype version.
Genie	Al-Qadim – Land of Fate (1992)	Jann and Marid	Based on notions from Middle Eastern culture, genies in the game are powerful elemental spirits from the Inner Planes, each of the four classical elements having its own subspecies of genie. Marids were largely changed from their mythological namesakes to fit to the element of water. Keith Ammann assumes the game's creators were inspired by the syllable mar- meaning "sea" in Latin, even though there is no such connection in Arabic.
Giant-kin, Cyclops	Dungeons & Dragons "white box" set (1974), Gods, Demi-gods & Heroes (1976), Deities & Demigods Cyclopedia (1980) (Greater and lesser), Legends & Lore (1985), Monster Manual II (1983) (Cyclopskin), Dungeons & Dragons Expert Set (1981 & 1983), Dungeons & Dragons Game (1981), Dungeons & Dragons Rules Cyclopedia (1991), Classic Dungeons & Dragons Game (1994), Dungeons & Dragons Adventure Game (1999), Legends & Lore (1990), Deities and Demigods (2002), Shining South (2004), Monster Manual (2008), Monster Manual 2 (2009) Monster Manual (2014)		One-eyed giants based on Greek mythology. Ranked tenth among the ten best mid-level 4th Edition monsters by the authors of Dungeons & Dragons 4th Edition For Dummies.
Giant-kin, firbolg			Bleeding Cool found the firbolg one "of the more distinctive race options in the D&D multiverse". Comic Book Resources stated that "Firbolgs are a blend of strength and magic" and as player characters your "harmony with nature will leave you definitely wanting to have a nature focus, but you'll also stand out in a crowd. As a naturally shy race, be sure to consider that when playing your character. Typically speaking, Firbolgs aren't aggressive."
Giant-kin, fomorian			
Giant-kin, verbeeg			
Gorgon			"iron plated bull", based on early modern bestiaries, with only the name being derived from the Classical counterpart.
Griffon			Originally based on the creature from Persian mythology, by now a "traditional monster".
Groaning spirit (banshee)			Based on the banshee from Irish folklore, as well as Gothic fiction, a typical denizen of the Ravenloft setting.
Guardian daemon		Least, lesser and greater	
Hag		Annis, Greenhag and Sea Hag	Immortal wicked and ugly powerful females with magical abilities for deception. Based on the pervasive figure from folklore, with "different interpretations of the monster around the world" being worked into different variants in the game, allowing each "a little more personality". In the view of Stang and Trammell, hags in D&D represent misogynistic and ageist tendencies in their authors. SyFy Wire in 2018 called it one of "The 9 Scariest, Most Unforgettable Monsters From Dungeons & Dragons", saying that "There are endless horrific possibilities when it comes to hags."
Haunt			
Hawk		Large (hawk), Small (falcon) and Blood Hawk	
Hell hound			In his review of the Monster Manual, Don Turnbull noted in the British magazine White Dwarf no. 8 (August/September 1978) that the breath weapon of the "much-feared" hell hound had been altered from its previous appearance.
Heucuva	as Huecuva: Fiend Folio (1981), Dungeon no. 86, Dungeon no. 94, Fiend Folio (2003), Dragon no. 364		Undead created from divine or oathbound creatures who have failed in their vows.
Hippocampus			Based on medieval bestiaries. "Depicted as the front half of a horse and the rear half of a fish or sea-serpent." Tyler Linn of Cracked.com listed it among the "15 Most Idiotic Monsters In Dungeons & Dragons History". He did not think "it would pose much of a threat" and "was intended to be one of the good guys", but found the depiction "douchey".
Hippogriff			Originally based on the creature from Persian mythology the adapted hippogriff "was among the earliest fantasy beasts introduced into the Dungeons & Dragons universe": An artistic representation drawing inspiration from real eagles and horses was used for the cover of the third booklet of the original Dungeons & Dragons (1974) edition and became one of "the game's earlies ambassadors" through use of that cover in advertisements. Gary Gygax used a story in which he received a letter asking how many eggs a Hippogriff could lay as an example of the encyclopedic knowledge which fans expected him to have over every detail of gameplay.
Jermlaine			
Kelpie			
Kenku			Crow-like humanoids with a tendency for thievery, loosely based on the Japanese tengu.
Ki-rin			Golden-scaled flying equine exemplar of good with one horn. Based on the kirin/ch'i-lin from Japanese/Chinese mythology, an example of the diverse cultures amalgamated into D&D. Black Gate reviewer Howard Andrew Jones called them "old stalwarts" of the game.
Killmoulis			
Kuo-toa			"evil fish-men"
Lamia		Lamia and Lamia Noble	Based on the depiction in Medieval bestiaries as a composite, part-human creature, rather than the original, more human-like Lamia from Greek myth.
Lammasu		Lesser and greater	Lion-like creature with a human head and wings, loosely based on the lamassu from Assyrian mythology.
Lamprey		Normal, giant and land	
Leech		Leech Swarm, Giant Leech and Throat leech	
Leprechaun			
Leucrotta			Based on the creature of the same name from Roman folklore.
Locathah			
Lurker above	Strategic Review no. 3 (lurker), Strategic Review no. 5 (trapper)	Lurker, Trapper, and Forest Trapper (Miner)	An original creation for the game's artificial underground environment, this monster was designed as a trap for unwary player characters; the trapper camouflages as a piece of floor, engulfing a victim stepping on it. Rob Bricken of io9 identified the lurker and the trapper as two of "The 12 Most Obnoxious Dungeons & Dragons Monsters".
Lycanthrope		Wereboar and Werefox (Foxwoman)	Scholar Aaron Trammell criticized female-coded lycanthropic opponents present from the beginning of the game: "When women enter the martial sphere, they are made monstrous".
Mammal, minimal			The minimal (a contraction of "miniature animal") is a magically reduced version of a normal animal.
Mammal, small		Beaver, Cat (house), Chipmunk, Ermine, Ferret, Fox, Gopher, Hedgehog, Mink, Mole, Monkey, Mouse, Muskrat, Opossum, Otter, Otter (sea), Otter (giant), Pig (domestic), Pig (wild), Rabbit, Raccoon, Squirrel (flying), Squirrel (giant black) and Woodchuck	Reviewer Philippe Tessier described the rabbit, when made available as a familiar, as little and "doesn't look like much", but valued it as cute, interesting and useful for detecting traps.
Merman			
Mimic		Common, Killer	An original creation for the game's artificial underground environment, this "iconic monster" looks like a treasure chest and is designed as a trap for unwary player characters.
Mold		Brown, Russet and Yellow	In the artificial dungeon environment of the game, molds function as a "clean up crew"; Chrulew considered molds typical flora within the game's "dungeon ecology".
Mongrelman			
Morkoth			Paste magazine reviewer Cameron Kunzelmann found the morkoth an inventive and "super weird" monster beyond the game's staples.
Muckdweller			
Myconid (fungus man)			A "race of [man-sized] sentient fungus creatures", "some of which pack a mean punch", and which have the "ability to spray poisons that can disable their foes".
Naga	Strategic Review no. 3	Guardian, Spirit and Water	Snake-like magical creatures with humanoid head. Based on the nāga from Indian mythology.
Nereid			A water kin elemental
Obliviax (memory moss)			A black moss that steals memories and forms a tiny version of the robbed person which can use the memories to fight. The obliviax appeared on Geek.com's list of "The most underrated monsters of Advanced Dungeons & Dragons", because ingesting the moss can transfer the memories, an "interesting" concept which lends itself to "Christopher Nolan-esque adventures that will be both universally applauded and terribly confusing at the same time."
Octopus, giant			
Osquip			
Otyugh		Otyugh and Neo-otyugh	Also known as gulguthra. Game designer Don Turnbull rated the otyugh as a "most interesting creation".
Piranha		Normal and giant	
Pixie			The pixie appeared as a player character class in Tall Tales of the Wee Folk (1989).
Plant, carnivorous		Choke Creeper, Hangman tree, Mantrap, Strangleweed, Giant Sundew and Tri-flower Frond	Author and gardener Charles Elliott considered D&D's plant species numerous but "not-very-ingenious".
Poltergeist			
Porcupine		Black, brown and giant	
Roc	Dungeons & Dragons set (1974), Monster Manual (1977), Monster Manual (2000), Monster Manual (2003), Monster Manual (2008), Monster Manual (2014)		An enormous bird, based on a mythological creature probably of Persian origin, known from Sindbad the Sailor.
Roper	Strategic Review no. 2		A dangerous inhabitant of the Underdark with "murderous behavior". One of the original creations for the game, Witwer et al. rated them among the "iconic D&D monsters".
Rot grub			An original creation for the game's artificial underground environment, this monster was designed as a trap for unwary player characters: living in corpses, they infect those who disturb these dead searching for riches.
Rust monster			Large armored tick-like monster which devours metals. An original invention for the game and its artificial underground world, the appearance of the rust monster was inspired by a plastic toy from Hong Kong. It was ranked among the most memorable as well as obnoxious creatures in the game, terrifying to certain characters and their players not due to their ability to fight but to destroy their items. Chris Sims of the on-line magazine Comics Alliance referred to the rust monster as "the most feared D&D monster".
Sahuagin			Also called 'Sea Devils', these fishperson eschewers of magic with two or four arms domesticate sharks and are in frequent conflict and intrigue with sea-elves.
Salamander		Salamander and Fire Snake	Fire-kin elementals
Sandling			An earth kin elemental
Sea horse, giant			
Sea lion	Monster Manual (1977), Monster Manual (2000) and Monster Manual (2003) (as Sea cat)		
Shambling mound	Strategic Review no. 3		Plant-like creature resembling a heap of rotting vegetation. Ben Woodard considered its ability to move "the base creepiness of the creep".
Shark		Common and giant (megalodon)	
Slithering tracker			Intelligent stealthy jelly creature. Either evolved from simpler relatives, or persons magically transfigured "by hags and liches into a blobby puddle of remains" motivated by revenge. Reviewer Zack Furniss saw the monster on the "more horrific side of D&D" and observed: "even once they've found their vengeance, they're still a nasty blob and often go insane because they can't find satiation or communicate. Grim stuff."
Slug, giant			
Sphinx		Androsphinx, Criosphinx, Gynosphinx and Hieracosphinx	Based on Egyptian and Classical mythology, an example of the diverse cultures amalgamated into D&D.
Squid, giant		Giant squid and Kraken	
Stirge			Flying and blood-sucking bird-like creatures. "[P]esky" because while small they are dangerous to characters as a swarm. Present in the game since its earliest edition.
Swanmay		Swanmay and Swan	Inspired by a character from Three Hearts and Three Lions by Poul Anderson rather than their mythological counterparts.
Sylph			An air kin elemental
Tarrasque			Ranked among the strongest monsters in the game by Scott Baird from Screen Rant, "the ultimate challenge for many players". Rob Bricken from io9 named the tarrasque as the 10th most memorable D&D monster. The tarrasque appeared on the 2018 Screen Rant top list at no. 5 on "Dungeons & Dragons: The 20 Most Powerful Creatures, Ranked", and Scott Baird highlighted that "The tarrasque is currently the most powerful creature in the 5th edition of Dungeons & Dragons, where it is matched only by Tiamat in terms of its combat prowess."
Tasloi			
Triton			An aquatic race based on the merman in Greek mythology.
Troglodyte			Based on the stock character of the primitive caveman, Gary Gygax portrayed the troglodyte in the game as more monstrous, with chaotic and evil behaviour, offensive smell and lizard-like characteristics. The troglodyte was among the monsters featured as trading cards on the back of Amurol Products candy figure boxes.
Urchin	Monster Manual II (1983)	Black, Green, Red, Silver, Yellow and Land	First published in White Dwarf no. 9 (October/November 1978), submitted by Nick Louth. It was voted among the top ten monsters from the magazine's "Fiend Factory" column and reprinted in Best of White Dwarf Articles (1980). The urchin's illustration from Monster Manual II (1983) was used by Richard Garfield for the "most notorious of the prototype cards", Starburst, during the development of his Magic: The Gathering game.
Urd			
Water weird			A water kin elemental, an "old personal favorite" of reviewer Mark Theurer.
Weasel		Wild and giant	
Whale		Common, Giant, Leviathan, Killer and Narwhal	The leviathan is based on the creature from Hebrew mythology.
Wolverine		Normal and giant	
Worm		Purple worm, Tenebrous worm and Tunnel worm	The "dread purple worm" attacks with both ends, maw and stinger. This "iconic monster" and original creation of Dungeons & Dragons is present all editions of the game.
Xorn			
Yellow musk creeper & zombie	Fiend Folio (1981)		Creeping plant that drains the intelligence of its victims, possibly turning them into "zombies" under the plant's control. Ben Woodard found it an expression of the "seemingly endless morphology of fungal creep and toxicological capacity" within the game. The Fiend Folio's illustration of the yellow musk creeper was used by Richard Garfield for the prototype of the Regrowth spell card during the development of his Magic: The Gathering game.

== TSR 2104 – MC3 – Monstrous Compendium – Forgotten Realms Appendix (1989) ==
This appendix to the Monstrous Compendium series was designed for use with the Forgotten Realms campaign setting for the second edition of the Advanced Dungeons & Dragons game. The pack consisted of 64 5-hole-punched unnumbered loose-leaf pages.

TSR 2104 – MC3 – Monstrous Compendium – Forgotten Realms Appendix (1989) – ISBN 0-88038-769-6
Creature	Other appearances	Variants	Description
Ascallion	Dragon no. 89 (1984), Monstrous Compendium Annual vol. 4 (1998) (as Fish, Ascallion)	Adult Female, Young, Adult Male	
Asperii	Dragon no. 89 (1984), 1991 Trading Card no. 622, Monstrous Compendium Annual vol. 4 (1998), Monster Manual II (2002)		
Beholder-kin	Monstrous Manual (1993)	Spectator, Gauth	
Belabra (Tangler)			
Berbalang			
Bhaergala	Monstrous Manual (1993) (as Mammal)		
Bichir (Lungfish, Giant)			
Bunyip	Fiend Folio (1981), Monstrous Compendium Annual vol. 3 (1996)		
Burbur	Monstrous Compendium Annual vol. 3 (1996)		
Claw, Crawling	Monstrous Manual (1993)		Screen Rant ranked the crawling claw among the 10 weakest monsters in 2018: "At best, you can use a bunch of them to act as a distraction or as a screen while another villain prepares a spell or trap."
Cloaker	Monstrous Manual (1993)		An original creation for the game's artificial underground environment, this monster was designed as a trap for unwary player characters; it looks like a living cloak with teeth.
Darkenbeast			
Death, Crimson	Monstrous Manual (1993) (asst, Crimson Death)		
Dinosaur	Monstrous Manual (1993) (Ankylosaurus, Deinonychus, Diplodocus, Elasmosaurus, Lambeosaurus, Pteranodon, Stegosaurus, Triceratops and Tyrannosaurus rex), Monstrous Compendium Annual vol. 2 (1995) (Allosaurus, Brontosaurus, Ceratosaurus, Compsognathus, Dimetrodon, Euparkeria, Gorgosaurus, Iguanodon, Monoclonius, Plateosaurus, Struthiomimus, Tanystropheus, Teratosaurus, Trachodon; under Dinosaur, Aquatic: Archelon, Dinichthys, Mosasaurus, Nothosaurus, Plesiosaurus, Temnodontosaurus)	Allosaurus, Anchisaurus, Ankylosaurus, Paleocinthus, Archelon, Brachiosaurus, Brontosaurus, Camarasaurus, Camptosaurus, Ceratosaurus, Cetiosaurus, Compsognathus, Deinonychus, Dilophosaurus, Dimetrodon, Dinichthys, Temnodontosaurus, Diplodocus, Elasmosaurus, Euparkeria, Gorgosaurus, Iguanodon, Lambeosaurus, Mamenchisaurus, Massospondylus, Megalosaurus, Monoclonius, Mosasaurus, Nothosaurus, Ornitholestes, Pentaceratops, Plateosaurus, Plesiosaurus, Podokesaurus, Pteranodon, Pterosaurus, Stegosaurus, Dacentrurus, Kentrosaurus, Struthiomimus, Styracosaurus, Tanystropheus, Teratosaurus, Trachodon, Triceratops, Tyrannosaurus rex	Considered among the "standard repertoire of 'Monsters'", and among the 12 most underrated monsters, "a creature as large and fearsome as a dragon but without all the hype".
Dracolich	Monstrous Manual (1993)		A dragon made even more powerful by transforming into an undead version of itself, which can only be destroyed if "its phylactery is taken to another dimension". Ranked among the strongest monsters in the game by Scott Baird from Screen Rant. It was also one of the first new creatures introduced for the Forgotten Realms campaign setting.
Dragon, Faerie	Monstrous Manual (1993) (as Dragonet, Faerie Dragon)		
Oriental Dragons (General)			Oriental dragons are based on Chinese dragons of real-world mythology.
Lung Wang (Sea Dragon)			
Pan Lung (Coiled Dragon)			
Shen Lung (Spirit Dragon)			
T'ien Lung (Celestial Dragon)			
Tun Lung (Typhoon Dragon)			
Yu Lung (Carp Dragon)			
Chiang Ling (River Dragon)			
Li Lung (Earth Dragon)			
Firenewt	Fiend Folio (1981), Monstrous Compendium Annual vol. 3 (1996)		
Firestar	Dragon no. 94 (1985), 1991 Trading Card no. 686, Sword of the Dales (1995), Monstrous Compendium Annual vol. 4 (1998)		
Maedar	Monstrous Manual (1993) (as Medusa, Maedar)	Maedar, Glyptar	Male version of the medusa, a consequence of turning the singular monster from classic mythology into a species in the game.
Meazel	Monstrous Compendium Annual vol. 3 (1996)		
Pleistocene Animals	Monstrous Compendium Annual vol. 2 (1995) (White Rhinoceros as Wooly Rhinoceros)	Axebeak, Baluchitherium, Megatherium, Phororhacos, White Rhinoceros, Titanothere	
Revenant	Monstrous Manual (1993)		
Rhaumbusun			
Strider, Giant	Fiend Folio (1981), Monstrous Compendium Annual vol. 3 (1996)		
Sull			
Svirfneblin (Deep Gnome)	Monstrous Manual (1993) (Gnome)		
Thessalmonster	Monster Manual II (1983), Monstrous Compendium Annual Vol. 3 (1996)	Thessalhydra, Thessalmera, Thessalgorgon, Thessaltrice	Thessalmonsters, an original invention from the D&D game, were created rather than born, by hybridizing different creatures. A thessalhydra combines elements of a hydra and a lizard, but with its eight heads surrounding a great maw. It also features a thoothed tail, toxic breath, and regenerative ability. It appeared in the TV series Stranger Things. Reviewer matseric observed that the chances to overcome this creature only as a team hearkens back to Hercules and Iolaus working together to defeat the original hydra. In the lore of the game, these monsters were originally "designed" by a lich character named Thessalar. The other variants featured heads from other creatures derived from Greek mythology, the chimera, gorgon, cockatrice, respectively.
Thri-kreen (Mantis Warrior)	Monster Cards Set 2 (1982), Monster Manual II (1983), Monstrous Compendium Forgotten Realms Appendix (1989), Monstrous Manual (1993), Dark Sun Monstrous Compendium Appendix II: Terrors Beyond Tyr (1995), Monster Manual II (2002), Monster Manual 3 (2010), Monster Manual (2014), Spelljammer: Adventures in Space (2022)		"Praying mantis man" with four arms and a poisonous bite, "invented by Paul Reiche III for the AD&D Monster Cards Set 2 (1982)", reviewer Mark Theurer considered them an "old personal favorite". With their additional limbs and specialized chatkcha and gythka weapons, thri-kreen were infamous as player characters optimized to do extreme amounts of damage. J.R. Zambrano found them "an interesting race" and preferred their "2nd Edition aesthetic" to others.
Thylacine			
Vulture	Monstrous Manual (1993) (as Bird)	Common, Giant, Condor	
Vurgens	Dragon no. 89 (1984), Monstrous Compendium Annual vol. 4 (1998) (as Fish, Vurgens (Giant Gulper Eel))		
Web, Living	Monstrous Compendium Annual vol. 3 (1996)	Living, Memory	
Wemic	Monstrous Manual (1993)		

== TSR 2105 – MC4 – Monstrous Compendium – Dragonlance Appendix (1990) ==
This appendix to the Monstrous Compendium series was designed for use with the Dragonlance campaign setting for the second edition of the Advanced Dungeons & Dragons game. The pack consisted of 96 5-hole-punched loose-leaf pages, unnumbered, and included a "How To Use This Book" page, a page with alphabetical index, 4 pages of random encounter charts, and 2 pages with the compiled game statistics, with the remainder consisting of the descriptions of the fictional monsters. Also included were 4 full-page illustrations on heavier card stock.

TSR 2105 – MC4 – Monstrous Compendium – Dragonlance Appendix (1990) – ISBN 0-88038-822-6
Creature	Other appearances	Variants	Description
Anemone, Giant	Dragon no. 116 (1986), Tales of the Lance (1992) Monstrous Compendium Annual vol. 4 (1998) (as Anemone, Giant Sea), Dungeon no. 79 (2000)		
Avian	Monstrous Manual (1993) (as Bird)	Emre, Kingfisher, Skyfisher and 'wari	
Bear, Ice			
Beast, Undead		Stahnk and Gholor	
Centaur, Abanasinian			
Centaur, Crystalmir			
Centaur, Endscape			
Centaur, Wendle			
Disir	Time of the Dragon (1989)		
Draconian (proto-), Traag	Time of the Dragon (1989)		
Draconians	Fizban's Treasury of Dragons (2021)		A "dragon-like humanoid species", born from embryos of good dragons corrupted by evil magic, are "cast as beings of pure horror", and "abominations"; "added to further support the world's foundational themes." Many of their traits were incorporated into the dragonborn player character race in the 4th edition of the game.
-- Draconian, Aurak			
-- Draconian, Baaz			
-- Draconian, Bozak			Barton and Stacks described this draconian as the "ever-popular bozak whose bones explode upon death".
-- Draconian, Kapak			
-- Draconian, Sivak			
Dragons of Krynn			Powerful and intelligent, usually winged reptiles with magical abilities and breath weapon.
-- Dragon, Amphi			
-- Dragon, Astral		Unmated Astral Dragon and Mated Pair	
-- Dragon, Kodragon	Dragon Magic (1989)		
-- Dragon, Othlorx	Time of the Dragon (1989)	Black, Blue, Brass, Bronze, Copper, Green, Red, Silver and White Othlorx	
-- Dragon, Sea			
Dreamshadow			
Dreamwraith			
Dwarf, Daergar			
Dwarf, Gully			A "tiny, dirty, unorganized folk", but having heart; known for their limited ability to count. Gully dwarves could be used as player characters in the D&D game. They were by design weaker than other character options, and so only appealing to few players who "enjoy the underdog status" they provided.
Dwarf, Hill (Neidar)			
Dwarf, Mountain (Hylar)			Environmental humanities scholar Matthew Chrulew considered the mountain dwarf subrace as an option "to customize a campaign, [...] based on relationship to place".
Dwarf, Theiwar			
Dwarf, Zakhar			
Elf, High – Qualinesti			
Elf, High – Silvanesti			
Elf, Wild – Kagonesti			Chrulew considered the wild elf subrace as an option "to customize a campaign, [...] based on relationship to place".
Elf, Half			
Elf, Sea – Dargonesti			
Elf, Sea – Dimernesti			
Eyewing	Dragon Magic (1989), Monstrous Manual (1993)		
Fetch			Inspired by Gothic fiction, a typical denizen of the Ravenloft setting.
Fire Minion	Time of the Dragon (1989)		
Fireshadow			
Gnome, Tinker (Minoi)	Monstrous Manual (1993)		Reporting on their presentation in 5th edition, Bleeding Cool editor Gavin Sheehan found tinkers one "of the cooler aspects of the Gnome life", as their ability to craft unusual objects "can basically make McGuffins for your campaign".
Gurik Cha'ahl	Time of the Dragon (1989)		
Hatori	Monstrous Manual (1993)	Lesser and Greater	
Haunt, Knight			
Horax	Time of the Dragon (1989), Monstrous Manual (1993)		
Imp, Blood Sea			
Insect swarm	Monstrous Manual (1993)	Velvet ants, Grasshoppers and Locusts	
Kalothagh (Prickleback)			
Kani Doll	Dragon Magic (1989)		
Kender			A "diminutive and highly playful race that resembles Tolkien's hobbit", with the ability to drive enemies into a rage by taunting them. Witwer et al. considered kender "lovable" characters "added to further support the world's foundational themes."
Knight, Death	Monstrous Manual (1993)		A death knight is a "powerful undead warrior"; Shannon Appelcline considered this creature created by Charles Stross one of the game's especially notable monsters.
Kyrie			
Lizard man (of Krynn)		Jarak-sinn and Bakali	
Man (of Krynn)		Ice Folk, Knights of Solamnia, Plainsmen and Rebels	
Minotaur (of Krynn)		Blood Sea Minotaur	
Ogre (of Krynn)		Ogre and Orughi	
Ogre, High (Irda)			
Phaethon		Phaethon and Elder Phaethon	
Shadowperson		Shadowperson and Revered Ancient One	
Shimmerweed			
Skrit	Time of the Dragon (1989)		
Slig			
Spectral Minion			"nasties" also appearing the Advanced Dungeons & Dragons: Heroes of the Lance computer game.
Spider (of Krynn)		Whisper Spider and Giant Trap Door Spider	
Stag		Wild Stag, Giant Stag and the White Stag	
Tayling		Tayling and Tayland	
Thanoi (Walrus Man)			
Tylor			
Warrior, Skeleton	Monstrous Manual (1993)		Reviewer Jamie Thomson found the skeleton warriors "beings similar to Tolkien's ringwraiths".
Wichtlin			
Wyndlass			
Yaggol	Time of the Dragon (1989)		
Yeti-kin, Saqualaminoi	Time of the Dragon (1989)		

== TSR 2107 – MC5 – Monstrous Compendium – Greyhawk Appendix (1990) ==
This appendix to the Monstrous Compendium series was designed for use with the Greyhawk campaign setting for the second edition of the Advanced Dungeons & Dragons game. The pack consisted of 64 5-hole-punched loose-leaf pages, unnumbered, and included a "How To Use This Book" page with an alphabetical index, 4 pages of random encounter charts, with the remainder consisting of the descriptions of the fictional monsters. Also included were 4 full-page illustrations on heavier card stock.

TSR 2107 – MC5 – Monstrous Compendium – Greyhawk Appendix (1990) – ISBN 0-88038-836-6
Creature	Other appearances	Variants	Description
Aspis	Monstrous Manual (1993) (as Insect)	Drone, Larva and Cow	
Beastman			
Beetle	Monstrous Compendium Annual vol. 3 (1996)	Death watch beetle and Slicer Beetle	
Bonesnapper			
Booka			
Brownie, Buckawn			Inspired by the brownie from Scottish folklore.
Brownie, Quickling	Monstrous Compendium Annual vol. 2 (1995)		Small, intelligent, chaotic and speedy, it appeared on Geek.com's list of "The most underrated monsters of Advanced Dungeons & Dragons". Inspired by the brownie from Scottish folklore.
Crypt thing	Monstrous Manual (1993)		
Crystalmist			
Dragons			Powerful and intelligent, usually winged reptiles with magical abilities and breath weapon.
-- Dragon, Cloud	Monstrous Manual (1993)		
-- Dragon, Greyhawk			
-- Dragon, Mist	Monstrous Manual (1993)		
-- Dragon, Shadow	Monstrous Manual (1993)		Reviewer Philippe Tessier found the shadow dragon a very dangerous foe in frontal assault.
Dragonfly, Giant	Monstrous Manual (1993) (as Insect)	Adult and Larva (Nymph)	
Dragonnel	Fizban's Treasury of Dragons (2021)		
Elf, Grugach			
Elf, Valley			A tribe of Gray Elves residing in the Valley of the Mage, acting as the mage's guardians and raiders. Despised by other Elves for subjugating themselves to a Human. Their leader, the First Protector, is a Drow.
Giant-kin, Voadkyn	Monstrous Manual (1993) (as Giant, Wood)		A type of Giant-kin somewhat resembling Elves, who live in forests and are on friendly terms with their sentient inhabitants.
Giant-kin, Spriggan	Monstrous Manual (1993) (as Gnome, Spriggan)		An evil variant of the common Gnome who can assume giant size and possesses innate magical abilities.
Grell	Monstrous Compendium – Spelljammer Appendix (1991) (as Soldier/Worker), Monstrous Manual (1993) (as Soldier/Worker)		"terrifying beaked, tentacled monsters that populate the realm of Underdark". Tyler Linn of Cracked.com listed the grell among the "15 Most Idiotic Monsters In Dungeons & Dragons History" and found that its movement by floating contributed to it looking ridiculous.
Gremlin	Monstrous Manual (1993)	Gremlin, Fremlin and Galltrit	
Grippli	Monstrous Manual (1993)		"humanoid tree-frogs" forming "a society of "uncommonly intelligent" humanoid amphibians who were quick to adapt and acquire new skills"; J. R. Zambrano thought of them as a good choice to create a player character race.
Grung			"selfish, simple-minded frog people" based on poisonous frogs
Hobgoblin, Norker	Fiend Folio (1981)		Savage cousins of the common Hobgoblin who sport naturally armored skin and fangs that they can use as weapons.
Hook horror	Monstrous Manual (1993)		A bipedal, subterranean monster that looks like a vulture-like humanoid with bony hooks in place of hands. The hook horror was first published in White Dwarf no. 12 (April–May 1979), and was originally submitted by Ian Livingstone. It was voted among the top ten monsters from the magazine's "Fiend Factory" column and reprinted in Best of White Dwarf Articles (1980). Ed Greenwood, in his review of the Fiend Folio for Dragon magazine, considered the hook horror as one of the creatures with "strange appearances and little else; there is no depth to their listings" and that it was one of the creatures which "seem incomplete".
Horgar			
Hound, Yeth	Planescape Monstrous Compendium Appendix (1994)		
Iguana, Giant			
Ingundi			
Kech	Monstrous Manual (1993)		Evil monkey-like forest-dwelling creatures endowed with psionic powers.
Kyuss, Son of	Fiend Folio (1981), Monstrous Compendium Annual vol. 3 (1996)		A mummy-like type of undead infested with worms which can, if latching onto an opponent, burrow into their victims' brain to turn them into more Sons of Kyuss.
Mist, Vampiric	Monstrous Manual (1993)		Cloud-like, amiorphous creatures which attack warmblooded beings to drain them of their blood.
Mite	Monstrous Manual (1993) (under Gremlin)	Mite and Snyad (Pestie)	
Necrophidius	Fiend Folio (1981), Monstrous Manual (1993) (as Golem, Necrophidius)		Undead consisting of a humanoid skull and giant snake vertebrae, "looks like the skeleton of a Guardian Naga", with venomous bite and mesmerizing powers; first published in White Dwarf no. 7 (June/July 1978), submitted by Simon Tilbrook. In 1980 it was voted the best monster from the magazine's "Fiend Factory" column.
Needleman	Fiend Folio (1981), Monstrous Compendium Annual vol. 3 (1996)		First published in White Dwarf no. 6 (April 1978), submitted by Trevor Graver. It was voted among the top ten monsters from the magazine's "Fiend Factory" column and reprinted in Best of White Dwarf Articles (1980).
Plant, Carnivorous		Vampire Cactus, Kampfult and Giant Polyp	Author and gardener Charles Elliott considered D&D's plant species numerous but "not-very-ingenious".
Rat		Camprat and Vapor Rat	
Raven (Crow)	Monstrous Manual (1993) (as Bird; Raven variants only)	Ordinary, Huge and Giant Raven and Crow	
Scarecrow	Fiend Folio (1981)		Golem variants created by evil priests as instruments of assassination. Some Scarecrows may develop sentience and spend their existence as murderous nomads.
Shadow, Slow	Mordenkainen's Fantastic Adventure (1984), Monstrous Compendium Annual vol. 4 (1998), Dungeon no. 112 (2004)		A variant of the common undead Shadow which latches onto a victim, numbing them with their cold touch.
Skulk			Cowardly, evil humanoids with a natural chameleon ability.
Snail		Flail and Sea Snail	Shannon Applecline considered the flail snail one of the "silly monsters" of the game. CJ Miozzi included the flail snail on The Escapist's list of "The Dumbest Dungeons & Dragons Monsters Ever (And How To Use Them)". Cameron Kunzelmann found it an inventive and "super weird" monster beyond the game's staples.
Sprite	Monstrous Manual (1993)	Atomie, Grig and Sea Sprite	Small to tiny-sized faerie races.
Taer	Monstrous Manual (1993)		Primitive, apelike humanoids who are superstitiously suspicious of metal.
Tentamort			
Turtle	Monstrous Compendium Annual vol. 2 (1995) (as Turtle, Giant)	Giant Sea and Giant Snapping Turtle	
Tyrg	Monstrous Manual (1993) (as Mammal)		
Wolf, Mist			
Wraith		Swordwraith and Soul Beckoner	
Zombie, Sea	Monstrous Manual (1993)		
Zygom			

== TSR 2116 – MC6 – Monstrous Compendium – Kara-Tur Appendix (1990) ==
This appendix to the Monstrous Compendium series was designed for use with the Oriental Adventures campaign setting called Kara-Tur for the second edition of the Advanced Dungeons & Dragons game. The pack consisted of 64 5-hole-punched loose-leaf pages, unnumbered, and included a "How To Use This Book" page with an alphabetical index and 4 pages of random encounter charts, with the remainder consisting of the descriptions of the fictional monsters. Also included were 4 full-page illustrations on heavier card stock.

TSR 2116 – MC6 – Monstrous Compendium – Kara-Tur Appendix (1990) – ISBN 0-88038-851-X
Creature	Other appearances	Variants	Description
Bajang			
Bakemono			
Bisan			Fey connected to a tree that can transform into flying insects, such as honey bees or fruit flies.
Buso		Tigbanua Buso and Tagamaling Buso	
Carp, Giant	Monstrous Manual (1993) (as Fish)		
Centipede, Spirit		Greater, Lesser and Least	
Chu-u			Legless ghosts deemed neither good or evil enough to enter the afterlife.
Con-tinh			Ghosts of women who died young. Their laugh could drive listeners to insanity.
Doc cu'o'c			Axe-wielding spirits that hunt evil ghosts. They have the appearance of a man cut perfectly in half.
Duruch'i-lin		Ch'i-lin and Duru	Based on the unicorn-like Ch'i-lin from Chinese mythology, an alternative conversion into the game to the ki-rin.
Flame Spirit		Greater, Lesser and Least	
Foo Creature	Planescape Monstrous Compendium Appendix (1994)	Foo Dog and Foo Lion	
Gaki		Jiki-ketsu-gaki, Jiki-niku-gaki, Shikki-gaki and Shinen-gaki	
Gargantua	Monstrous Manual (1993)	Reptilian, Humanoid and Insectoid Gargantua	
Goblin Rat			Goblinoid wererats unable to transmit lycanthropy.
Goblin Spider			Giant spider that can mimic voices.
Hai Nu			Sentient aquatic humanoids.
Hannya			
Hengeyokai	Oriental Adventures (as PC race)	Carp, Cat, Crab, Crane, Dog, Drake, Fox, Hare, Monkey, Racoon Dog, Rat, Sparrow	Race of sentient shapeshifting animals able to adopt humanoid, beast, and hybrid forms.
Hsing-sing			Ape-like creatures naturally peaceful outside of "war-season", during which they become more aggressive.
Hu Hsien			Appears to be an oriental female human with long fox tail. These are magically enchanted, evil women with spell-abilities and an endless hunger for human life energy. They are type vampire capable of shapeshifting.
Ikiryo			
Jishin Mushi			Giant beetles able to create earthquakes.
Kala		Cave and Earth Kala	Primitive, cone-headed humanoids. Cave kala could inject paralyzing venom by biting enemies and Earth kala could infect creatures with diseases through their breath.
Kaluk			Humanoid elephants with an insatiable greed for wealth.
Kappa	Oriental Adventures (1985, 2001)	Common Kappa, Kappa-ti and Vampiric Kappa	The Kappa has been considered one of the more prominent figures from Japanese mythology to be adapted into roleplaying game settings inspired by Asian cultures such as Kara-Tur. A kappa in the game resembles an almost furless, green-skinned, beaked, fiendish monkey, with a cragged depression in its head containing water which acts as its cerebrospinal fluid.
Korobokuru		Common Korobokuru and Ishikorobokuru	Dwarf-like race.
Krakentua			Kraken-headed humanoids that wield weapons in their tentacles. Reviewer Michael Mullen described the krakentua as "a really nasty new monster" in its first appearance in Night of the Seven Swords.
Kuei			Ghosts of those killed before fulfilling a goal or purpose, similar to a revenant.
Memedi		Gendruwo and Common Memedi	Incorporeal spirits.
Men		Wako (sea pirate) and Frost Barbarians	
Men-shen			
Nat		Einsaung Nat, Hkum Yeng Nat and Lu Nat	Malicious, brightly colored fey.
Ningyo			
Oni		Common Oni, Go-zu-oni and Me-zu-oni	
P'oh		Gohei P'oh	Small bronze humanoids capable of causing harm with their touch.
Shan Sao			Short humanoids that live in bamboo huts and can summon tigers.
Shirokinukatsukami			
Spirit, Nature		Least, Lesser and Greater	
Spirit, Stone		Small, Medium and Large	
Spirit Folk		Bamboo, River and Sea Spirit Folk	
Tako	Monstrous Manual (1993)	Male and Female	A race of sentient, intelligent octopus. The name comes from the Japanese word for octopus.
Tengu		Crow and Humanoid Tengu	
Wang-Liang			
Yuan-ti, Histachii	Monstrous Manual (1993)		
Yuki-on-na			

== TSR 2109 – MC7 – Monstrous Compendium – Spelljammer Appendix (1990) ==
This appendix to the Monstrous Compendium series was designed for use with the Spelljammer campaign setting for the second edition of the Advanced Dungeons & Dragons game. The pack consisted of 64 5-hole-punched loose-leaf pages, unnumbered, providing the descriptions of the fictional monsters. Also included were 4 full-page illustrations on heavier card stock.

TSR 2109 – MC7 – Monstrous Compendium – Spelljammer Appendix (1990) – ISBN 0-88038-871-4
Creature	Other appearances	Variants	Description
Aartuk			
Albari			
Ancient Mariner			
Argos	Monstrous Manual (1993)		
Astereater	Monstrous Manual (1993) (under Beholder; reference only)		
Beholder-kin	Monstrous Manual (1993)	Director, Examiner, Overseer, Lensman and Watcher	Reviewer Alex Lucard counted the beholder-kin among the "cool monsters" in MC7.
Blazozoid			
Chattur	Monstrous Manual (1993) (as Mammal)		
Clockwork Horror	1993 Trading Card no. 222, Monstrous Compendium Annual vol. 4 (1998), Monster Manual II (2002) (Adamantine, Electrum, Gold, Platinum), Dragon no. 350 "The Ecology of the Clockwork Horror" (2006) (Copper)	Copper, Silver, Electrum, Gold, Platinum and Adamantite	
Colossus			
Delphinid			
Dizantar			
Esthetic			
Focoid			
Fractine			
Giant, Spacesea			
Golem, Furnace			Reviewer Alex Lucard considered the furnace golem one of the "cool monsters" in MC7.
Golem, Radiant			
Gravislayer			
Grommam			
Hadozee			Critically described by Aaron Trammell as "a simian race of humanoids reminiscent of old minstrel shows", subject of criticism when translated into 5th edition.
Hamster, Giant Space		Subterranean, Sabre-Toothed, Rather Wild, Invisible, Sylvan, Jungle, Miniature, Armor-Plated, Yellow Musk, Ethereal, Carnivorous Flying, Two-Headed Lernaean Bombardier, Fire-Breathing Phase Doppelganger, Great Horned, Abominable, Tyrannohamsterus Rex, and Giant Space Hamster of Ill-Omen	Reviewer Alex Lucard considered the various giant space hamsters "the most infamous race of creatures TSR ever put out" and "enough to make the curious pick this [the Spelljammer Monstrous Compendium MC7] up". He found the concept of a tyrannohamsterus rex laughable – until one had to fight one.
Jammer Leech			
Lakshu			
Lumineaux			
Lutum (Mud-Woman)			
Mimic, Space			
Misi			
Moon, Rogue			
Mortiss			
Murderoid			
Nay-Churr			
Phlog-Crawler			
Pirate of Gith	Monstrous Manual (1993) (as Gith, Pirate)		
Plasman			
Plasmoid, General	Spelljammer: Adventures in Space (2022)		A "slime race", made available as player characters for the 5th edition.
Plasmoid, DeGleash			
Plasmoid, DelNoric			
Plasmoid, Ontalak			
Puffer			
Q'nidar			
Rastipede			Reviewer Alex Lucard liked the rastipede and considered it awesome that it later became a player character race.
Reigar			
Rock Hopper			
Slinker			
Spider, Asteroid			
Spiritjam			
Survivor			
Syllix			
Symbiont			
Vine, Infinity			Reviewer Alex Lucard considered the infinity vine one of the "cool monsters" in MC7.
Wiggle (Hurwaet)		Hurwaet, Swamp Wiggle, Salt Wiggle	
Wizshade	Volo's Guide to All Things Magical (1996), Monstrous Compendium Annual vol. 4 (1998)		
Wryback			
Zard			
Zodar			The zodar appeared on the 2018 Screen Rant top list at no. 13 on " Dungeons & Dragons: The 20 Most Powerful Creatures, Ranked", and Scott Baird highlighted that "One of the most mysterious and powerful creatures in the Spelljammer universe are the Zodar, who resemble giant suits of armor. In their Advanced Dungeons & Dragons appearance, they had the maximum Strength score that was allowed in the game and they were immune to almost all forms of damage."

== TSR 2118 – MC8 – Monstrous Compendium – Outer Planes Appendix (1991) ==
This appendix to the Monstrous Compendium series for the second edition of the Advanced Dungeons & Dragons game added additional creatures from the Outer Planes. The pack consisted of 96 double-sided, 5-hole-punched loose-leaf pages, unnumbered, providing the descriptions of the fictional monsters, as well as a 2-page "How to use this book" section, and a 4-page section providing background information on the Outer Planes.

TSR 2118 – MC8 – Monstrous Compendium – Outer Planes Appendix (1991) – ISBN 1-56076-055-9
Creature	Other appearances	Variants	Description
Aasimon	Planescape Monstrous Compendium Appendix (1994)		Celestials from the Outer Planes, "charming creatures protecting the universe against evil".
Aasimon, Agathinon	Planescape Monstrous Compendium Appendix (1994)		
Aasimon, Deva	Planescape Monstrous Compendium Appendix (1994)	Astral, Monadic and Movanic	
Aasimon, Light	Planescape Monstrous Compendium Appendix (1994)		
Aasimon, Planetar	Planescape Monstrous Compendium Appendix (1994)		
Aasimon, Solar	Planescape Monstrous Compendium Appendix (1994)		Very powerful winged angelic humanoids. Backstab reviewer Michaël Croitoriu thought them truly interesting for powergamers when made available as player characters.
Air Sentinel			
Animal Lord	Planescape Monstrous Compendium Appendix (1994)	Cat Lord, Wolf Lord and Hawk Lord	
Archon	Planes of Law (1995)	Lantern, Hound, Warden, Sword and Tome	
Baatezu	Monstrous Manual (1993), Planescape Monstrous Compendium Appendix (1994)		Don Turnbull considered the devils the most prominent among the new monsters introduced in the Monster Manual: "they are all pretty strong and compare not unfavourably in this respect with the Demons we already know". Renamed from devils in response to moral panic. Many were based on figures from Christian demonology.
Baatezu – Lemure	Planescape Monstrous Compendium Appendix (1994)		Among lowest of fiends, these "living piles of rotting flesh that look like puddles of pink skin" are one initial incarnation of evil souls when arriving at the lower planes. Screen Rant reviewer Scott Baird ranked them among the weakest monsters in the game.
Baatezu, Greater – Amnizu	Planescape Monstrous Compendium Appendix (1994)		
Baatezu, Greater – Cornugon	Planescape Monstrous Compendium Appendix (1994)		Also called the horned devil. Inspired by Dante Alighieri's Inferno.
Baatezu, Greater – Gelugon	Planescape Monstrous Compendium Appendix (1994)		
Baatezu, Greater – Pit Fiend	Monstrous Manual (1993), Planescape Monstrous Compendium Appendix (1994)		
Baatezu, Least – Nupperibo	Planescape Monstrous Compendium Appendix (1994)		
Baatezu, Least – Spinagon	Planescape Monstrous Compendium Appendix (1994)		
Baatezu, Lesser – Abishai	Monstrous Manual (1993), Planescape Monstrous Compendium Appendix (1994)	Black, Green and Red	
Baatezu, Lesser – Barbazu	Planescape Monstrous Compendium Appendix (1994)		
Baatezu, Lesser – Erinyes	Planescape Monstrous Compendium Appendix (1994)		Based on the figures from Greek mythology.
Baatezu, Lesser – Hamatula	Planescape Monstrous Compendium Appendix (1994)		
Baatezu, Lesser – Osyluth	Planescape Monstrous Compendium Appendix (1994)		
Balaena	Planescape Monstrous Compendium Appendix II (1995)		
Bariaur	Planescape Monstrous Compendium Appendix (1994)		Centaur-like creature, a player character race in the Planescape setting, where reviewer Johnny L. Wilson found they fill a similar niche than dwarves. They are "fierce fighters and congenial sojourners – as long as you don't serve meat or befriend any giants".
Bebilith	Planescape Monstrous Compendium Appendix (1994)		
Bodak	Planescape Monstrous Compendium Appendix (1994)		
Celestial Lammasu			
Dragon, Adamantite			
Einheriar	Planescape Monstrous Compendium Appendix (1994)		Based on the "Einheriar" of Norse mythology but expanded from their cultural background to mean "any humanoid spirit employed by the powers or deities of the outer planes as servants, warriors, patrollers or guards", not only by the fictionalized version of the Norse pantheon; thus an example how "game authors and designers transform and adapt references from various sources, not hesitating to articulate or even merge them into new forms."
Gehreleth	Planescape Monstrous Compendium Appendix (1994)	Farastu, Kelubar and Shator	Known as demodands in other editions.
Githyanki	Monstrous Manual (1993), Planescape Monstrous Compendium Appendix (1994), Mordenkainen's Tome of Foes (2018), Mordenkainen Presents: Monsters of the Multiverse (2022)		Xenophobic humanoids with gaunt stature, leathery yellow skin and fangs; inhabitants of the Astral Plane, and ancient enemies of the githzerai.
Githzerai	Monstrous Manual (1993), Planescape Monstrous Compendium Appendix (1994), Mordenkainen's Tome of Foes (2018), Mordenkainen Presents: Monsters of the Multiverse (2022)	Zerth, Rrakkma band	Designed by Charles Stross, these humanoids are the ancient and fervent enemies of mind flayers, to whom they were formerly enslaved, and the githyanki; they are based on the plane of Limbo. A playable species in the Planescape campaign setting, reviewer Johnny L. Wilson found them a new take on the niche usually occupied by elves. Shannon Applecline considered the githzerai one of the game's especially notable monsters, while ComicBook.com contributor Christian Hoffer counted "the conflict between the otherworldly githzerai and githyanki" among "the great conflicts that make up the D&D multiverse", and praised the expanded lore presented in Mordenkainen's Tome of Foes as "certainly useful as both inspiration and as research material for building a D&D campaign."
Hordling	Planescape Monstrous Compendium Appendix (1994)		
Larva	Planescape Monstrous Compendium Appendix (1994)		Evil mortal transformed into comparatively harmless larva-like creature by a night hag and used as a currency on the lower planes.
Maelephant	Planescape Monstrous Compendium Appendix (1994)		
Marut	Planescape Monstrous Compendium Appendix (1994)		
Mediator	Planescape Monstrous Compendium Appendix (1994)		
Moon Dog	Monstrous Manual (1993) (as Dog, Moon), Monster Manual II (1983)		Also called black hound or night crawler
Mortai	Planescape Monstrous Compendium Appendix II (1995)		
Night Hag	Planescape Monstrous Compendium Appendix (1994) (as Nighthag)		Powerful hag from Hades, propagating evil by creating larvae. Don Turnbull referred to the night hag as "splendid" and notes that the illustration of the night hag is the best drawing in the book. It has been described as comparable to the Alp of folklore, although "considered a more Judeo-Christian demonic influence".
Nightmare	Monstrous Manual (1993), Planescape Monstrous Compendium Appendix (1994)		
Noctral	Planescape Monstrous Compendium Appendix II (1995)		
Per	Planescape Monstrous Compendium Appendix (1994)		
Phoenix	Monstrous Manual (1993)		
Slaad	Monstrous Manual (1993) (Gray and Death by reference only), Planescape Monstrous Compendium Appendix (1994)	Red, Blue, Green, Gray and Death	Ed Greenwood considered the slaadi "worthy additions to any campaign". GameSpy author Allan Rausch described the slaadi as "remorseless reptilian killing machines", but "For many years, slaad were a joke – because of their artwork", which showed them as "six-foot tall carnivorous frogs". With the Planescape setting they "were reinterpreted artistically to be less frog-like and much more fearsome". Shannon Applecline considered the slaad one of the game's especially notable monsters.
Tanar'ri	Monstrous Manual (1993), Planescape Monstrous Compendium Appendix (1994)		Renamed from demons in response to moral panic, many were based on figures from Christian demonology. Considered among the "standard repertoire of 'Monsters'" by Fabian Perlini-Pfister. In a review of Planescape Monstrous Compendium Appendix II for Arcane magazine, the reviewer cites the culture of the tanar'ri as helping "give the Planes a solid base of peoples".
Tanar'ri, Greater – Babau	Planescape Monstrous Compendium Appendix (1994)		
Tanar'ri, Greater – Chasme	Planescape Monstrous Compendium Appendix (1994)		
Tanar'ri, Greater – Nabassu	Planescape Monstrous Compendium Appendix (1994)		
Tanar'ri, Guardian – Molydeus	Planescape Monstrous Compendium Appendix (1994)		
Tanar'ri, Least – Dretch	Planescape Monstrous Compendium Appendix (1994)		
Tanar'ri, Least – Manes	Planescape Monstrous Compendium Appendix (1994)		
Tanar'ri, Least – Rutterkin	Planescape Monstrous Compendium Appendix (1994)		
Tanar'ri, Lesser – Alu-Fiend	Monster Manual II (1983, as alu-demon), Planescape Monstrous Compendium Appendix (1994)		
Tanar'ri, Lesser – Bar-Lgura	Planescape Monstrous Compendium Appendix (1994)		
Tanar'ri, Lesser – Cambion	Planescape Monstrous Compendium Appendix (1994)		
Tanar'ri, Lesser – Succubus	Planescape Monstrous Compendium Appendix (1994)		Based on conceptions from "Medieval Christian folklore", a typical example of a demon, belonging to the "standard repertoire of 'Monsters'" and one of those contributing to the moral panic; also an instance of the sexist tropes the game draws on which presented female sexuality as inherently dangerous. Rob Bricken of io9 identified the succubus as one of "The 12 Most Obnoxious Dungeons & Dragons Monsters".
Tanar'ri, True – Balor	Monster Manual (1977), Monstrous Manual (1993), Planescape Monstrous Compendium Appendix (1994)		Featuring a highly-muscled man-like body and bat wings, whip and jagged sword, it is based on and renamed from the Balrog from J.R.R. Tolkien's legendarium due to copyright reasons, also called type VI demon.
Tanar'ri, True – Glabrezu	Planescape Monstrous Compendium Appendix (1994)		Has a composite appearance, broad and strong-looking, with a head like a goat-horned dog, pincers instead of hands, and human arms protruding from its chest. Called type III demon in earlier editions.
Tanar'ri, True – Hezrou	Planescape Monstrous Compendium Appendix (1994)		Looks like a gross toad with human arms in place of forelegs. Called type II demon in earlier editions.
Tanar'ri, True – Marilith	Monster Manual (1977), Monstrous Manual (1993), Planescape Monstrous Compendium Appendix (1994)		Called type V demon in earlier editions. Aardy R. DeVarque identified elements from Hindu mythology as an inspiration.
Tanar'ri, True – Nalfeshnee	Planescape Monstrous Compendium Appendix (1994)		Combines features of ape and boar. Called type IV demon in earlier editions.
Tanar'ri, True – Vrock	Planescape Monstrous Compendium Appendix (1994)		Resembles a cross between human and vulture. Called type I demon in earlier editions.
Titan	Monstrous Manual (1993)		Based on the powerful beings from Greek mythology. Ranked among the strongest creatures in the game by Scott Baird from Screen Rant, as they "stand above giants and possess even more power in terms of their physical and magical capabilities". Backstab reviewer Michaël Croitoriu thought them truly interesting for powergamers when made available as player characters.
Translator	Planescape Monstrous Compendium Appendix (1994) (under Mediator)		
T'uen-rin	Planescape Monstrous Compendium Appendix II (1995)		
Vaporighu	Planescape Monstrous Compendium Appendix II (1995)		
Warden Beast	Planes of Conflict (1995)		
Yugoloth	Monstrous Manual (1993) (as Yugoloth, Guardian), Planescape Monstrous Compendium Appendix (1994)		"fiend for hire native to the plane of Gehenna"
Yugoloth, Greater – Arcanaloth	Planescape Monstrous Compendium Appendix (1994)		
Yugoloth, Greater – Nycaloth	Planescape Monstrous Compendium Appendix (1994)		
Yugoloth, Greater – Ultroloth	Planescape Monstrous Compendium Appendix (1994)		
Yugoloth, Lesser – Dergholoth	Planescape Monstrous Compendium Appendix (1994)		
Yugoloth, Lesser – Hydroloth	Planescape Monstrous Compendium Appendix (1994)		
Yugoloth, Lesser – Mezzoloth	Planescape Monstrous Compendium Appendix (1994)		
Yugoloth, Lesser – Piscoloth	Planescape Monstrous Compendium Appendix (1994)		
Yugoloth, Lesser – Yagnoloth	Planescape Monstrous Compendium Appendix (1994)		
Zoveri	Planes of Law (1995)		

== TSR 2119 – MC9 – Monstrous Compendium – Spelljammer Appendix (1991) ==
This appendix to the Monstrous Compendium series was designed for use with the Spelljammer campaign setting for the second edition of the Advanced Dungeons & Dragons game. The pack consisted of 64 5-hole-punched loose-leaf pages, unnumbered, providing the descriptions of the fictional monsters, and a single-page index of the creatures in the Spelljammer campaign setting (including sources).

TSR 2119 – MC9 – Monstrous Compendium – Spelljammer Appendix (1991) – ISBN 1-56076-071-0
Creature	Other appearances	Variants	Description
Alchemy Plant			
Allura			
Aperusa			
Autognome			
Bionoid			
Bloodsac			
Buzzjewel			
Constellate			
Contemplator			
Dohwar			
Dragon, Moon			
Dragon, Sun			
Dragon, Stellar			
Dreamslayer			
Dweomerborn			
Fal			
Feesu			
Firebird			
Firelich			
Flowfiend			
Gadabout			
Gammaroid			
Gonn			
Gossamer			
Grav			
Great Dreamer			
Greatswan			
Grell, Colonial	Monstrous Compendium – Greyhawk Appendix (1990) (Soldier/Worker), Monstrous Manual (1993) (as Grell)	Soldier/Worker, philosopher, Patriarch	"terrifying beaked, tentacled monsters that populate the realm of Underdark". Tyler Linn of Cracked.com listed the grell among the "15 Most Idiotic Monsters In Dungeons & Dragons History" and found that its movement by floating contributed to it looking ridiculous.
Gullion			
Insectare			
Lhee		Common, Lesser, Greater	
Mercurial Slime			
Meteorspawn			
Monitor			
Owl, Space			
Pristatic			
Scro			
Selkie, Star			
Silatic		Platinum, Gold, Iron	
Skullbird			
Sleek	Monstrous Manual (1993) (as Mammal)		
Sluk			
Space Swine			
Spirit Warrior		Spirit Warrior, Zwarth	
Sphinx, Astro			
Starfly Plant			
Stargazer			
Undead, Stellar			
Witchlight Marauders		Primary, Secondary, Tertiary, Space and Remote	
Xixchil	Monstrous Manual (1993) (as Thri-Kreen variant)		Intelligent insectoid creatures, xixchil are a variant of thri-kreen for the Spelljammer setting. "They are spacefarers and innovaters and masterful surgeons" willing to "upgrade" individuals by modification of body-parts. For J.R. Zambrano they have a cyberpunk feel to them: "So, cybernetically augmented insectmen. In space."
Yitsan			
Zurchin			

== TSR 2122 – MC10 – Monstrous Compendium – Ravenloft Appendix (1991) ==
This appendix to the Monstrous Compendium series was designed for use with the Ravenloft campaign setting for the second edition of the Advanced Dungeons & Dragons game. The pack consisted of 32 5-hole-punched loose-leaf pages, unnumbered, and included a 1-page "How To Use This Book" section, a 1-page set of tables for Ravenloft random encounters, and a 2-page section on developing and describing encounters to fit the Ravenloft genre, with the remainder of the set consisting of the descriptions of the fictional monsters. Also included were 4 full-page illustrations on heavier card stock. The contents were republished in 1996 in paperback format within the Ravenloft Monstrous Compendium Appendices I & II.

Luis Javier Flores Arvizu named the continuous presence of supernatural beings as one of the factors that made Ravenloft a very well received role-playing game setting during the 33 years of its existence.

-
Creature	Other appearances	Variants	Description
Bastellus			An undead shadow creature feeding on the dreams of sleeping persons. Also called a nightmare or a dream stalker, but not identical to either of the other creatures with those names.
Bat, Ravenloft		Sentinel and Skeletal Bat	Sentinel Bats: dark variants of normal bats serving as familiars to powerful undead creatures.
Bowlyn			Undead spirits who were extremely selfish sailors in life and haunt seafaring ships to kill the living as revenge for their demise.
Broken Ones	Monstrous Manual (1993)	Common and Greater	Hideous hybrids of man and animal brought into being by botched transforrmation spells or insane grafting experiments.
Bussengeist			A type of ghost who died in a catastrophe which it could have prevented but chose not to, and is condemned to haunt sites of impending disasters, exasperating the situation with its despair-inducing aura.
Darkling			A Vistani outcast who is corrupted by Ravenloft's nature and twisted into absolute evil.
Doom Guard			Animated suits of armor serving as guards against intruders.
Doppelganger Plant		Doppelganger Plant and Podling	A sentient, evil plant which ensnares and traps the souls of its victims inside its pod growths, turning their bodies into its slaves (podlings) and feeding on their life essence.
Elemental, Ravenloft		Blood, Grave, Mist and Pyre	Variants of common elementals who derive their physical substance from the dark essence of the Ravenloft realms.
Ermordenung			Humans converted into agents and assassins in the service of Ivana Boritsi, ruler of the domain of Borca, who are infamous for their stunning beauty and their virulently deadly poisonous touch.
Ghoul Lord			A higher-rank type of ghoul which inflictes its victims with a deadly, wasting disease.
Goblyn			Goblin-like creatures which are actually people deliberately turned into this form by twisted magic to serve as unquestioning slaves to their transformer's will.
Golem, Ravenloft	Monstrous Manual (1993)	Bone, Doll, Gargoyle, Glass, Mechanical and Zombie	Variants of golems infused by the dark powers of Ravenloft during their creation. First created by Strahd von Zarovich (bone and zombie golems), the concept of calling upon the dark powers to animate them subsequently spread to other types as well.
Grim Reaper			A non-undead skeletal creature wielding a scythe which appears only to claim and devour the souls of the dying.
Imp, Assassin			A variant of the common imp and familiar which can only be summoned in Ravenloft, and which is willing to kill all who might pose a threat to its master, including their allies.
Impersonator			An evil, blood-drinking creature of viscous consistency which can assume the appearance of any person whose blood it has consumed in order to lure more victims into its reach.
Lycanthrope, Werebat	Monstrous Manual (1993)		Evil lycanthropes capable of turning into either giant bat form or human/bat hybrid form.
Lycanthrope, Wereraven	Monstrous Manual (1993)		Good-aligned lycanthropes which can turn either into huge ravens or a hybrids of man and raven.
Men (Abber Nomads)	The Nightmare Lands (1995)		The nomadic human inhabitants of the Nightmare Lands who have developed a certain resistance against that domain's everchanging illusionary nature.
Men (Lost Ones, Madmen)		Lost Ones and Madmen	Humans whose minds were shattered by Ravenloft's horrors, leaving them in either a catatonic state (Lost Ones) or prone to spontaneous, murderous rages (Madmen).
Mist Horror	Dungeon Magazine #42 (1993)	Common, Wandering and Pseudo	Non-corporeal creatures dwelling in the mists of Ravenloft which assumes the shapes of creatures feared by its intended victims.
Mummy, Greater	Touch of Death (1991), Monstrous Manual (1993)		Mummy with additional priestly powers. Based on the creature from Gothic fiction, a typical denizen of the Ravenloft setting.
Quevari			Human-like people who undergo a startling psychological change during full moon nights, becoming muderous, bloodthirsty assassins and cannibals.
Quickwood (Spy Tree)	Dungeon Magazine #67 (1998)		A sentient, flesh-eating tree.
Ravenkin			Good-aligned sapient raven creatures.
Reaver			Humanoid aquatic creatures living in the Sea of Sorrows whose bodies are covered with razor-sharp scales.
Scarecrow			Normal scarecrows inhabited by the spirits of farmers who seek vengeance on those people who have maligned them in life.
Shadow Fiend	Planescape Monstrous Compendium Appendix (1994)		
Skeleton, Giant	Monstrous Manual (1993)		A standard skeleton which is magically enlarged and animated with a fire burning in its abdominal cavity, which can be used as an offensive weapon.
Strahd's Skeletal Steeds			Undead skeletal horses first created by the vampiric necromancer Strahd von Zarovich.
Treant, Evil			A common treant twisted into an existence of evil by the dark powers of Ravenloft.
Treant, Undead			An evil treant which refuses to accept death and is turned into an undead creature by the dark powers of Ravenloft.
Valpurgeist			A type of revenant, the animated body of a person unjustly hanged for a crime they did not commit and who can be released from undeath if their innocence is proven.
Vampire, General Information			Powerful and subtle undead sustained by drinking blood or draining life force. Inspired by Bram Stoker, as well as Gothic fiction more generally, a typical monster for the horror-setting of Ravenloft.
-- Vampire, Dwarf			A Dwarf affected by a specific strain of vampirism which allows them to phase through stone and drain Constitution.
-- Vampire, Elf			A very powerful type of vampire who drain Charisma, are harmed by darkness and are very difficult to destroy permanently.
-- Vampire, Gnome			Undead Gnomes who can induce deadly laughing fits in their victims and drain Dexterity.
-- Vampire, Halfling			Undead Halflings who drain Strength and Constitution with their touch and induce magical fatigue.
-- Vampire, Kender			A strain of vampire created by Soth, darklord of Sithicus, and exclusive to that domain.
Vampyre			A human-like creature which drains blood from human victims, though they are actually living beings, not undead.
Widow, Red			Shapeshifting spiders which can assume the form of very attractive human females to lure victims into their lairs. Named for their coloration, which is the exact reverse of a common black widow's.
Wolfwere, Greater			An enhanced version of the common wolfwere.
Zombie Lord	Monstrous Manual (1993)		A powerful type of zombie which commands a horde of common zombies. Notorious for its aura of rot, which may instantly kill living beings and revive them as zombies under its control.

== TSR 2125 – MC11 – Monstrous Compendium – Forgotten Realms Appendix II (1991) ==
This appendix to the Monstrous Compendium series was designed for use with the Forgotten Realms campaign setting for the second edition of the Advanced Dungeons & Dragons game. The pack consisted of 32 5-hole-punched unnumbered loose-leaf pages, and 4 full-page illustrations on heavier card stock. It included a single-page table of contents but did not incorporate the usual "How to Use this Book" section or random encounter charts.

TSR 2125 – MC11 – Monstrous Compendium – Forgotten Realms Appendix II (1991) – ISBN 1-56076-111-3
Creature	Other appearances	Variants	Description
Alaghi	Monstrous Compendium Annual vol. 3 (1996)	Normal, Sedentary and Hermetic	
Alguduir			
Avian	Monstrous Manual (1993)	Flightless, Boobrie and Eblis	
Bat, Deep	Dragon no. 90 (1984), D&D Master Rules (1985) (Werebat), Monstrous Compendium Ravenloft Appendix (1991) (Werebat), Dungeons & Dragons Rules Cyclopedia (1991) (Werebat), Drow of the Underdark (1991), 1991 Trading Cards Set no. 383 (Werebat), Night Howlers (1992) (Werebat), Monstrous Manual (1993), Ravenloft Monstrous Compendium Appendices I & II (1996) (Werebat), Monsters of Faerûn (2001) (Night Hunter, Sinister)	Azmyth, Night Hunter, Sinister and Werebat	
Beguiler			
Cantobele			
Cat	Monstrous Manual (1993) (Domestic, Wild, Elven)	Domestic, Wild, Elven, Luck Eater and Change Cat	
Chitine	Monstrous Compendium Annual vol. 1 (1994), Dragon no. 223 "The Ecology of the Chitine" (1995), Monsters of Faerûn (2001), Underdark (2003), D&D Miniatures: Dragoneye set #47 (2004)		
Cildabrin	Monstrous Compendium Annual vol. 3 (1996)		
Dimensional Warper			
Dragon, Deep	Drow of the Underdark (1991), Monstrous Manual (1993), Monsters of Faerûn (2001), D&D Miniatures: Underdark set #52 (2005), Drow of the Underdark (2007), Draconomicon (2008) (as "Purple Dragon")		
Elf, Aquatic	Monstrous Manual (1993)	Malenti	Malenti are actually sahuagin but through a mutation "born with the appearance of a Sea-Elf", their "ancient enemies"; while despised by their kin, they are "raised by the clan's leadership to serve as spies inside Sea-Elf society."
Fachan	Savage Coast Monstrous Compendium Appendix (1996)		
Feyr	Monstrous Manual (1993), Spelljammer: Adventures in Space (2022)	Normal and Great	"a tentacled aberration [...]. Turning itself invisible it will attach its tentacles to your face while you sleep to feed on your emotions", a creature suitable as horror element.
Firetail	Monstrous Compendium Annual vol. 3 (1996)	Lesser and Tshala	
Frost			
Gaund		Frost Gaund	
Giant, Mountain	Monstrous Manual (1993)		
Gloomwing	Monstrous Manual (1993)		
Golden Ammonite	Dragon no. 48 (1981), Monstrous Compendium Annual vol. 4 (1998)		
Golem, Lightning			
Hamadryad	Monstrous Compendium Annual vol. 3 (1996)		Based on the "Tree nymphs in Greek mythology".
Harrier		Harrier and Larvae	
Harrla			
Haun			
Haundar			
Hendar			
Inquisitor	Monstrous Compendium Annual vol. 4 (1998), Dragon no. 352 (2007)		
Lhiannan Shee			
Loxo	Monstrous Compendium Annual vol. 1 (1994), Monster Manual II (2002), Savage Species (2003), Shining South (2004)		
Manni	Dragon no. 163 (1990)		
Mara ("Great Walker")			
Morin	Dragon no. 163 (1990)		
Naga, Dark	Dragon no. 89 (1984), Anauroch (1991), Forgotten Realms Campaign Setting (1993), Monstrous Manual (1993), Dragon no. 261 "The Ecology of the Dark Naga: Fool Me Twice" (1999), Monster Manual (2000, 2003), D&D Miniatures: Underdark set #33 (2005), Monster Manual (2008)		
Orpsu	Anauroch (1991)		
Peryton	Monstrous Manual (1993)		
Phantom	Monstrous Manual (1993)		Inspired by Gothic fiction, a typical denizen of the Ravenloft setting.
Plant, Carnivorous	Monstrous Manual (1993) (Retch Plant, Snapper-Saw, Thornslinger)	Retch Plant, Snapper-Saw, Thornslinger, Viper Vine, Whip-Weed, Wither-Weed and Black Willow	Author and gardener Charles Elliott considered D&D's plant species numerous but "not-very-ingenious".
Ringworm			
Rohch		Wood, Killer, Swamp and Dark	
Sand Cat	Dragon no. 163 (1990)		
Saurial	Monstrous Compendium Annual vol. 3 (1996)	Finhead, Bladeback, Flyer and Hornhead	Humanoid species evolved from specific types of dinosaurs. Made available as player character races in The Complete Book of Humanoids, and have appeard on Spellfire cards. Dragonbait is a notable saurial novel character.
Sha'az			
Silver Dog			
Simpathetic			
Skuz			
Spider, Monkey			
Tempest	Monstrous Manual (1993) (under Elemental, Composite)		
Tlincalli	Monstrous Manual (1993) (as Manscorpion)		
Tren			

== TSR 2405 – MC12 – Monstrous Compendium – Dark Sun Appendix: Terrors of the Desert (1992) ==
This appendix to the Monstrous Compendium series was designed for use with the Dark Sun campaign setting for the second edition of the Advanced Dungeons & Dragons game. The pack consisted of 96 5-hole-punched loose-leaf pages, unnumbered, and included a 4-page "How To Use This Book" section with random encounter charts, with the remainder consisting of the descriptions of the fictional monsters. Also included were 4 full-page illustrations on heavier card stock.

TSR 2405 – MC12 – Monstrous Compendium – Dark Sun Appendix: Terrors of the Desert (1992) – ISBN 1-56076-272-1
Creature	Other appearances	Variants	Description
Animal, Household		Hurrum, Critic, Renk and Ock'n	Hurrum: A beetle whose wingbeats create a soothing sound. Critic: small lizards which are easily spooked, thus serving as living alarms. Renk: small slugs which feed on sweat and store the recyvled water in their bodies. Ock'n: small snails which exude a resin-like slime which can be used as a sealant.
Animal, Herd		Kip, Z'tal and Jankz	Small animals herded or hunted for their meat and other useful body parts.
Antloid, Desert		Dynamis, Soldier, Queen and Worker	Giant desert ants. Dynamis are males with psionic abilities who act as coordinators for the Soldiers and protectors for their Queen.
B'rohg	Spelljammer: Adventures in Space (2022)		Huge and extremely primitive humanoids sporting four arms.
Banshee, Dwarf			Inspired by the banshee from Irish folklore.
Beetle, Agony			Beetles who sink their proboscis into a victim's spinal nerves to psonically feed on the resulting pain.
Bog Wader			
Brambleweed		Brambleweed and Bramble Tree	Thorn-studded plants which are cultivated to serve as natural barriers or sources for spiked clubs.
Burnflower			Flowers whose petals exude a heat-reflecting substance, enabling then to use the reflected heat as a defensive weapon.
Cat, Psionic		Tagster and Tigone	Two species of great cat who uses innate psionic abilities to stalk and subdue their prey.
Cha'thrang			A tortoise-like creature sporting hollow tubes on its back shell which it can use to launch threaded projectiles against airborn prey.
Cistern Fiend			Giant worm-like creatures which feed on body fluids and excrete clean water, making them valuable for keeping water holes and wells clean from contaminants.
Cloud Ray			Gigantic, flight-capable rays which are feared and tough predators.
Drake, Athasian – General Information			
-- Drake, Air			
-- Drake, Earth			
-- Drake, Fire			
-- Drake, Water			
Dune Runner			Undead Athasian Elf who were killed while delivering a message, and are compelled to repeat their mission even beyond death. Can use their psionic abilities to compel victims to join them until they collapse from exhaustion.
Dune Trapper			A gigantic combination of animal and plant which disguises itself as an oasis to lure victims into its maw.
Elemental, Athasian – General Information			Elementals made up of their respective element, with some "vagueness of form", which may provide more mobility in situations of danger.
-- Elemental, Greater Air			
-- Elemental, Greater Earth			
-- Elemental, Greater Fire			
-- Elemental, Greater Water			
-- Elemental, Lesser Air/Earth		Leasser Air and Lesser Earth Elemental	
-- Elemental, Lesser Fire/Water		Lesser Fire and Lesser Water Elemental	
Erdland			A large variant of the common Erdlu.
Esperweed			A plant which temporarily enhances a psionic's abilities if consumed. Prolonged use, however, can instead diminish psionic abilities.
Flailer			
Floater			
Giant, Athasian	Dark Sun Campaign Setting (1995)	Desert, Plains and Beasthead Giant	Desert: 25ft-tall giant living on desert islands; Plains: 25ft-tall giant raising herds on islands with scrub plains terrain; Beasthead: 20ft-tall hostile giant with an animal head
Golem, Athasian – General Information			
-- Golem, Ash/Chitin		Ash and Chitin Golem	
-- Golem, Obsidian/Rock		Obsidian and Rock Golem	
-- Golem, Sand/Wood		Sand and Wood Golem	
Halfling, Renegade			Rogue versions of Athasian Halflings who do not share the racial loyalty of their more civilized relatives.
Hej-kin			
Id Fiend			
Insect Swarm, Athasian		Locusts and Mini-kanks	Normal-sized insects which form massive swarms. Each living creatures in their path will be relentlessly devoured (locusts) or drained of their blood (mini-kanks).
Kank, Wild			
Kirre	Monstrous Manual (1993)		A six-legged great cat with horns and a spike-studded tail.
Megapede			A gigantic variant of the common Centipede.
Mul, Wild			Human-dwarf descended sterile warriors.
Nightmare Beast			
Plant, Carnivorous		Blossomkiller, Dew Fronds, Poisonweed and Strangling Vines	Author and gardener Charles Elliott considered D&D's plant species numerous but "not-very-ingenious".
Pterran			
Pterrax			
Pulp Bee			
Pyreen (Peace-bringers)			
Rasclinn			
Razorwing			
Roc, Athasian			
Sand Bride		Sand Bride and Sand Mother	
Sand Cactus			
Sand Vortex			
Scrab			
Silt Horror		White, Brown and Gray Horror	
Silt Runner			
Sink Worm			
Sloth, Athasian			A huge, semi-humanoid forest predator with a special preference for Halflings as prey.
So-ut (Rampager)			Semi-humanoid monsters which are driven to destroy man-made structures and items.
Spider Cactus			A cactus variant which can shoot off threaded spikes to draw a victim to its body, impale it and then drain its body fluids.
Spider, Crystal			A crystalline giant spider whose webs are filaments sharp enough to cut flesh.
Spirit of the Land		Air, Earth, Fire and Water Spirits	
T'Chowb			Tiny humanoid with unstable intelligence which uses its psionic abilities to permanently drain other beings of their intelligence.
Thrax			Former humans infected by a curse which changes their fingers into suction devices which they use to drain water from the bodies of other creatues.
Tohr-kreen (Mantis Noble)	Monstrous Manual (1993) (under Thri-kreen)		Larger, more cultured, civilized and also more dangerous version of the thri-kreen, who spend their existence wandering and collecting knowledge. Commentator J.R. Zambrano suggested that they "make excellent allies" for player characters.
Villichi			A rare breed of human-born women with very strong psionic potential. Upon coming of age, they are taken into a secluded convent, where they live in isolation from the rest of Athas' people. Due to superstition, as well as actual incidents of vengeance, villichi are seldomly bothered or mistreated.
Zhackal			A small, canine creature which psionically feeds on a dying victim's emotions.
Zombie Plant			An intelligent plant which can psionically entice humanoids into eating its berries, which make their consumers become addicted and thus the plant's slave servants.

== TSR 2129 – MC13 – Monstrous Compendium – Al-Qadim Appendix (1992) ==
This appendix to the Monstrous Compendium series was designed for use with the Arabian Nights-themed Al-Qadim campaign setting for the second edition of the Advanced Dungeons & Dragons game. The pack consisted of 64 5-hole-punched loose-leaf pages, unnumbered, and included a "How To Use This Book" page with an alphabetical index, a one-page index of appropriate monsters for the Al-Qadim setting from other books of the Monstrous Compendium-series, 2 pages of random encounter charts, and a sheet with the compiled game statistics, with the remainder consisting of the descriptions of the fictional monsters. Also included were 4 full-page illustrations on heavier card stock.

Referring to their adaptation in the video game Al-Qadim: The Genie's Curse, White Wolf reviewer James V. Trunzo called the setting's monsters "delightfully horrible creatures" which "aren't just old concepts given new names".

TSR 2129 – MC13 – Monstrous Compendium – Al-Qadim Appendix (1992) – ISBN 1-56076-370-1
Creature	Other appearances	Variants	Description
Ammut			Semi-humanoid creatures looking like a cross between crocodile, hippopotamus and female lion who consume the hama (spirits) of the wicked. Based on the Egyptian deity of the same name.
Ashira			
Asuras	Planescape – Planes of Conflict (1995)		
Black Cloud of Vengeance			
Buraq	Planescape – Planes of Conflict (1995)		
Camel	Monstrous Manual (1993) (under Mammal, herd)	Desert, Mountain, Racing and War camel	
Camel of the Pearl			
Centaur, Desert			
Copper Automaton			
Debbi			
Elephant Bird			
Gen		Air, Fire, Sand and Water Gen	Regularly summoned by sha'irs, these minor elemental spirits were these wizards' main source of spells.
Genie, Noble Dao			
Genie, Noble Djinni			
Genie, Noble Efreeti	Al-Qadim – Caravans (1994)		
Genie, Noble Marid			
Genie, Tasked			
-- Genie, Tasked, Architect/Builder			
-- Genie, Tasked, artist			
-- Genie, Tasked, Guardian			
-- Genie, Tasked, Herdsman			
-- Genie, Tasked, Slayer			
-- Genie, Tasked, Warmonger			
-- Genie, Tasked, Winemaker			
Ghost Mount			
Ghul, Great	Al-Qadim – Caravans (1994), Monstrous Compendium Annual vol. 2 (1995)		
Giants, Zakharan			
-- Giant, Desert			
-- Giant, Jungle			
-- Giant, Reef			
Hama			The spirits of the dead who rise from their mortal bodies in the form of birds. The form varies with alignment; good spirits appear as eagles, owls or similar birds, while evil hama will manifest as birds with bad or no flying capability. While they mostly pass on into the afterlife, some may remain in the mortal world until a certain condition connected to their death is resolved.
Heway	Monstrous Manual (1993) (under Snake)		
Living Idol		Animal, Death, Elemental and Healing Living Idol	
Lycanthrope, Werehyena			
Lycanthrope, Werelion			
Markeen			
Maskhi			
Mason-Wasp, Giant			
Nasnas			Monster that appears like only one half (left or right) of a human; first published in White Dwarf no. 9 (October/November 1978), submitted by Roger Musson. Already suggested to be used humorously by editor Don Turnbull then, it was voted as the worst of monsters from the magazine's "Fiend Factory" column.
Pahari			Mermaid-like nymphs who can change between full human, mermaid and fish forms. Known to be potent magic-users.
Rom			
Sabu Lords			
Sakina			
Serpent Lord			
Serpent, Winged			Animal studies scholar Matthew Chrulew observed that in contrast to more harmless animals the game dedicated space to "serpents, and their monstrous kin" as creatures which "are, indeed, monstrous in the powerful, predatory sense" and among "the most Nietzschean of animals".
Silats		Young, Adult and Matriarch	
Simurgh			
Stone Maidens			
Vishap			
Zaratan	Monstrous Manual (1993)		
Zin			

== TSR 2132 – MC14 – Monstrous Compendium – Fiend Folio Appendix (1992) ==
This appendix to the Monstrous Compendium series updated and reprinted creatures from the first edition Advanced Dungeons & Dragons Fiend Folio published in 1981. It contained 64 unnumbered loose leaf pages and 4 pages of illustrations on heavier card stock.

TSR 2132 – MC14 – Monstrous Compendium – Fiend Folio Appendix (1992) – ISBN 1-56076-428-7
Creature	Other appearances	Variants	Description
Aballin	Forgotten Realms Campaign Setting (1993), Monstrous Compendium Annual vol. 1 (1994), Monsters of Faerûn (2001)		
Achaierai	Planes of Law (1995)		CJ Miozzi included the achaierai on The Escapist's list of "The Dumbest Dungeons & Dragons Monsters Ever (And How To Use Them)".
Adherer			
Algoid		Purple Algoid	
Al-mi'raj			Based on Al-mi'raj "in Islamic poetry, a yellow hare with a single black horn on its head." Counted among the saddest, lamest creatures in Fiend Folio by artist Sean McCarthy, a hybrid creature with physiology resulting from maladaptation rather than evil.
Apparition			
Caterwaul			
Coffer Corpse	Monstrous Compendium Annual vol. 3 (1996)		
Crabman	Monstrous Manual (1993)		
Dark Creeper			
Dark Stalker			
Darter			
Denzelian			
Dragon, Gem	Fizban's Treasury of Dragons (2021)		Dragons of neutral alignment. Reviewers remarked that "They have some interesting breath weapons", their damaging effect being based on unusual kinds of energy, while also possessing psionic powers.
Dragon, Amethyst	Monstrous Manual (1993), Fizban's Treasury of Dragons (2021)		
Dragon, Crystal	Monstrous Manual (1993), Fizban's Treasury of Dragons (2021)		
Dragon, Emerald	Monstrous Manual (1993), Fizban's Treasury of Dragons (2021)		
Dragon, Sapphire	Monstrous Manual (1993), Fizban's Treasury of Dragons (2021)		
Dragon, Topaz	Monstrous Manual (1993), Fizban's Treasury of Dragons (2021)		
Dune Stalker			
Falcon, Fire			
Faux Faerie			
Firedrake	Monstrous Manual (1993) (as Dragonet, Firedrake)		
Flawder			
Fyrefly	Monstrous Manual (1993) (under Insect)		
Gambado	Fiend Folio (1981), Forgotten Realms Campaign Setting (1993), Monstrous Compendium Annual vol. 1 (1994), Tome of Horrors (2002)		
Garbug	Fiend Folio (1981), Monstrous Compendium Annual vol. 1 (1994)	Black, Violet	
Giant, Fog	Monstrous Manual (1993)		
Gibberling	Fiend Folio (1981), Forgotten Realms Campaign Setting (1993), Monstrous Manual (1993), Dragon no. 265 (1999), Monsters of Faerûn (2001)		Humanoid "hairy screaming monsters that attack in large groups and seek to devour everything in their path", "little more than mindless beasts". Screen Rant reviewer Scott Baird ranked them among the weakest monsters in the game, which have a scary description, but lack the stats to back up this impression.
Gorbel	Monstrous Manual (1993) (under Beholder; by reference only)		
Grimlock	Monstrous Manual (1993)		Humanoids also made available as player characters; compared to human characters their "special capacities are to be envied".
Hellcat	Planes of Law (1995) (as Bezekira)		
Ice Lizard			
Iron Cobra			
Khargra	Planescape Monstrous Compendium Appendix III (1998)		
Mantari			
Mephit	Monstrous Manual (1993) (as Imp, Mephit), Planescape Monstrous Compendium Appendix (1994) (Lava as Magma)	Fire, Ice, Lava, Mist, Smoke and Steam	First published in White Dwarf no. 13 (June/July 1979) under the names of fire imp, molten imp, smoke imp and steam imp, respectively (not including ice and mist mephits), originally submitted by M. Stollery. These "imps" were voted among the top ten monsters from the magazine's "Fiend Factory" column in 1980.
Penanggalan			
Pernicon	Monstrous Manual (1993) (under Insect)		
Phantom Stalker			
Quaggoth	Fiend Folio (1981), Forgotten Realms Campaign Setting (1993), Monstrous Manual (1993), Dragon no. 265 (1999), Monsters of Faerûn (2001), D&D Miniatures: War Drums set #57 (2006), Drow of the Underdark (2007)		
Retriever	Planescape Monstrous Compendium Appendix II (1995)		
Ruve			
Scathe		Scathe and Larvae	
Sheet Ghoul, Sheet Phantom			
Shocker	Planescape Monstrous Compendium Appendix III (1998)		
Spanner			
Stwinger	Monstrous Compendium Annual vol. 1 (1994) (under Faerie, Petty), Savage Coast Monstrous Compendium Appendix (1996) (under Na‰ruk)		As a fairy creature considered among the "standard repertoire of 'Monsters'" by Fabian Perlini-Pfister.
Sussurus			
Symbiotic Jelly			
Terithran	Planescape Monstrous Compendium Appendix III (1998)		
Thunder Children			
Troll, Ice	Monstrous Manual (1993)		
Tween			
Umpleby	Monstrous Compendium Annual vol. 2 (1995)		Trenton Webb, in his review of Monstrous Compendium Annual Two for British RPG magazine Arcane, called the shambling umpleby "without a shadow of a doubt" the star of the book: "Effectively a Bigfoot whose wooly hair generates shocking levels of static electricity, these hulking eccentric simpletons will test any parties patience and ability to save against cuteness." Webb also added that even without the umpleby the book "would be a necessary resource for all mainstream refs. With the shaggy-haired one, though, it rapidly approaches the essential."
Urdunnir	Monstrous Compendium Annual vol. 3 (1996) (as Dwarf, Urdunnir)		
Volt			First published in White Dwarf no. 7 (June/July 1978), originally submitted by Jonathan Jones. The volt was voted among the top ten monsters from the magazine's "Fiend Factory" column in 1980.
Xill	Planescape Monstrous Compendium Appendix III (1998)		
Xvart			Bald, blue-skinned humanoids with orange eyes that stand only 3 feet tall. First published in White Dwarf no. 9 (October/November 1978) under the name of "svart", submitted by Cricky Hitchcock and "taken from The Weirdstone of Brisingamon by Alan Garner", who in turn took inspiration from the Norse myth of the svartálfar. It was voted among the top ten monsters from the magazine's "Fiend Factory" column and reprinted in Best of White Dwarf Articles (1980). Forgotten Realms author Ed Greenwood considered xvarts to be redundant creatures with no unique or interesting characteristics.
Zygraat			

== TSR 2139 – MC15 – Monstrous Compendium – Ravenloft Appendix II: Children of the Night (1993) ==
This appendix to the Monstrous Compendium series was designed for use with the Ravenloft campaign setting for the second edition of the Advanced Dungeons & Dragons game. The pack consisted of 32 5-hole-punched loose-leaf pages, unnumbered, and included a 2-page "How To Use This Book" section, a 1-page description of the purpose of the "Children of the Night" supplement, a 1-page set of tables for Ravenloft random encounters, and a 1-page section updating the tables for calculation of experience points awarded for defeating any given creature. The remainder of the set consisted of the descriptions of specific fictional monsters and personalities in the Ravenloft campaign setting. Also included were 4 full-page illustrations on heavier card stock. The contents were republished in 1996 in paperback format within the Ravenloft Monstrous Compendium Appendices I & II.

Luis Javier Flores Arvizu named the continuous presence of supernatural beings as one of the factors that made Ravenloft a very well received role-playing game setting during the 33 years of its existence.

TSR 2139 – MC15 – Monstrous Compendium – Ravenloft Appendix II: Children of the Night (1993) – ISBN 1-56076-586-0
Creature	Other appearances	Variants	Description
Brain, Living (Rudolph Von Aubrecker)			AD&D's version of a brain in a vat, a functioning and aware brain removed from its body. Tyler Linn of Cracked.com included the idea among the "15 Most Idiotic Monsters In Dungeons & Dragons History", humorously commenting: "just kick it over, who's going to know?"
Ermordenung (Nostalia Romaine)			The best friend of darklord Ivana Boritsi of the domain Borca, who willingly became the progenitor of the Ermordenung and killed Ivana's mother at her friend's request.
Ghoul, Ghast (Jugo Hesketh)			A former priest of the false god Zakata from the domain G'Henna, and a personal friend of its darklord Yago Petrovna who was the leader of Petrovna's inquisition and became an undead after being killed by vengeful mongrelmen.
Golem, Half (Desmond LaRouce)			A human physician and dear friend of Sir Hiregard/Maalken, the darklord of Nova Vasa. The left half of his body was destroyed when he tracked down Maalken, and was replaced by the body parts of a flesh golem. Inspired by Gothic fiction.
Golem, Mechanical (Ahmi Vanjuko)			A human ranger whose mind was forcibly transplanted into a Mechanical Golem's hull by the darklord Easan the Mad. Inspired by Gothic fiction.
Human, Cursed (Jacqueline Montarri)			A human thief who longed for immortality, killing a Vistani elder to reach that goal, before she was caught breaking into Castle Ravenloft and beheaded. Now cursed to live without her original head, forcing her to acquire new heads to wear. Inspired by Gothic fiction, cursed creatures are a typical example for the denizens of the Ravenloft setting.
Human, Madman (The Midnight Slasher)			A female human living in the domain of Invidia whose mind was driven to madness by darklod Gabrielle Aderre after the latter had an affair with her father and later caused both parents to kill each other.
Human, Voodan (Chicken Bone)			A member of a mysterious breed of humans steeped in the art of controlling zombies through mystical rituals. He lives in and plies his trade in the swamp domain of Souragne.
Lich, Bardic (Andres Duvall)			A bard who was accidentally turned into a lich after having been hosted and spying on Azalin of Darkon, and one of the darklord's sworn enemies.
Lycanthrope, Weretiger (Jahed)	Web of Illusion (1993)		An infected weretiger from the Forgotten Realms who was drawn into Ravenloft by the rakshasa goddess Rabanna to kill her renegade son Arjani, darklord of Sri Raji.
Meazel (Salizarr)			A meazel from Cormyr in the Forgotten Realms who was kidnapped by the mists of Ravenloft and now lives in the sewers of Il Aluk in the domain of Darkon.
Medusa (Althea)			A medusa of unknown origin who lives in a subterranean labyrinth on one of Ravenloft's Islands of Dread.
Mummy, Greater (Senmet)			A former priest who served Ankthepot, tried to usurp power and was mummified alive. He was later made undead by the priestess Rehkotep as her intended slave, but the ritual was incomplete, making him free-willed.
Night Hag (Styrix)			A night hag kidnapped by Azalin to help him find an escape from Ravenloft. Has succeeded in building a Dimension Spanner, which she intends to use to escape the Domain of Dread on her own.
Spectre (Jezar Wagner, The Ice Queen)			An adventurous noblewoman from the domain Barovia, who became an undead after being buried alive in a cave of Mount Baratok by an avalanche, doomed to rise and haunt the mountain every winter.
Thrax (Palik)			A thrax from Athas who found himself stranded in the Ravenloft domain Kalidnay.
Treant, Evil (Blackroot)			A formerly common treant turned to evil by the hag darklords of Tepest.
Vampire, Illithid (Athaekeetha)			The last and mightiest of the mind flayer vampires created by Lysssa of Zarovich and illithid elder brain of Bluetspur.
Vampire, Eastern (Mayónaka)			A samurai from Kara-Tur turned into an Oriental vampire and then brought to Ravenloft. Tired of his undead existence, he has sworn to give his life in a duel against a worthy opponent.
Vampyre (Vladimir Ludzig)			A vampyre from a world outside of Ravenloft who was stranded in the Domain of Dread after seeking new conquests and sources of fresh blood. Now resides in the domain of Falknovnia, where he has become the leader of Lekar's resident vampyres.

== TSR 2140 – Monstrous Manual (1993) ==
The Monstrous Manual was printed after the completion of the loose-leaf Monstrous Compendium series, in 1993. This book was "created in response to the many requests to gather monsters into a single, durable volume which would be convenient to carry." The Monstrous Manual compiled all of the monsters from Monstrous Compendium Volumes One and Two, as well as many creatures from subsequent volumes and other sources, and revised, updated, and in some cases condensed the entries; these are not duplicated here. The book is 384 pages.

TSR 2140 – Monstrous Manual (1993) – ISBN 1-56076-619-0
Creature	Other appearances	Variants	Description
Aurumvorax			Also named golden gorger, this creature "looks like an evil, eight-legged badger". Rob Bricken of io9 identified the aurumvorax as one of "The 12 Most Obnoxious Dungeons & Dragons Monsters", being "a particularly terrifying monster in that it eats that gold the players have so carefully accrued".
Beholder and beholder-kin	Wildspace (1990) (Beholder Mage)	Eye of the deep; Beholder Mage by reference only	
Brain mole			
Brown dragon			
Mercury dragon			
Steel dragon			
Yellow dragon			
Dwarf		Derro	
Elemental, earth kin		Pech	See Outsider
Elemental, composite		Skriaxit	
Fish	Fiend Folio (1981)	Quipper	
Gnome		Rock Gnome, Forest Gnome	Environmental humanities scholar Matthew Chrulew considered the forest gnome subrace as an option "to customize a campaign, [...] based on relationship to place".
Golem		Stone variants (caryatid column, juggernaut, and stone guardian)	Inspired by Gothic fiction, a typical denizen of the Ravenloft setting. The influence of Dungeons & Dragons has led to the inclusion of golems in other tabletop role-playing as well as in video games.
Insect		Assassin bug, Worker bee, Soldier bee, Bumblebee, Cave cricket, Ear seeker, Firefriend (giant firefly), Giant bluebottle fly, Giant horsefly, Gargantuan praying mantis, Giant harvester termite (king, queen, soldier, worker), Giant tick	Giant-sized versions of insects. Chrulew considered insects a typical fauna part of the game's "dungeon ecology".
Intellect devourer		Adult (intellect devourer) and larva (ustilagor)	SyFy Wire in 2018 called it one of "The 9 Scariest, Most Unforgettable Monsters From Dungeons & Dragons", saying that "The idea of having your brain consumed and just becoming an evil puppet is truly terrible."
Ixitxachitl			An "old personal favorite" of reviewer Mark Theurer.
Living wall	Book of Crypts (1991), Dragon no. 343 (May 2006)		Created by a powerful wizard, a living wall is built from living beings, which are absorbed into the surface of the wall itself, helping to enhance its collective powers. The living wall appeared on Geek.com's list of "The most underrated monsters of Advanced Dungeons & Dragons".
Mammal		Cooshee, Dakon, Goat, Gorilla, Losel, Stench Kow, Giant mammals	Lawrence Schick described the stench kow as "a monstrous bison that smells real bad". CJ Miozzi included the stench kow on The Escapist's list of "The Dumbest Dungeons & Dragons Monsters Ever (And How To Use Them)".
Mold man (vegepygmy)			A former human transformed by russet mold. CJ Miozzi included the vegepygmy on The Escapist's list of "The Dumbest Dungeons & Dragons Monsters Ever (And How To Use Them)".
Mudman			Vaguely humanoid creature bound to and formed from a puddle of mud. Ranked among the weakest monsters in the game by Scott Baird from Screen Rant, as it can only attack by preventing a closeby creature from running away.
Ogre, half-		Half-ogre and Ogrillon	
Ooze/slime/jelly	Fiend Folio (1981)	Olive Slime, Olive Slime Creature, Mustard Jelly, Stunjelly	"D&D's large variety of monstrous oozes and slimes took their original inspiration from Irvin S. Yeathworth Jr's The Blob" film. In the artificial dungeon environment of the game, they function as a "clean up crew". Environmental humanities scholar Matthew Chrulew considered slimes typical flora within the game's "dungeon ecology". The Fiend Folio's illustration of the stunjelly was used by Richard Garfield for the prototype of the Animate Wall spell card during the development of his Magic: The Gathering game.
Plant, intelligent		Thorny	Author and gardener Charles Elliott considered D&D's plant species numerous but "not-very-ingenious".
Roper	Strategic Review No. 2	Storoper	
Shedu	Savage Coast Monstrous Compendium Appendix	Lesser and Greater	Lawful good winged equine with human-like head. Based on a creature from Mesopotamian mythology.
Snake		Amphisbaena, Boalisk	
Snake, winged			
Spider		Gargantuan	
Su-monster			
Swanmay		Bird Maiden	
Thought-eater			
Troll		Desert, Spectral (Troll Wraith), Giant, and Spirit Troll	Tall gaunt humanoids with powerful regenerative ability. A characteristic denizen of AD&D worlds.
Worm		Mottled Worm, Thunderherder, Giant Bloodworm	
Xorn		Xaren	
Yugoloth, guardian		Least, Lesser and Greater	

== TSR 2602 – Planescape Monstrous Compendium Appendix (1994) ==
This appendix to the Monstrous Compendium series was designed for use with the Planescape campaign setting for the second edition of the Advanced Dungeons & Dragons game. The 128-page soft-bound book contains a two pages of explanation about the various entries and a page with a list of monsters from this and other sources by plane, with the remainder consisting of the descriptions of the fictional monsters. Many of them were republished from Monstrous Compendium – Outer Planes Appendix and other sources and are not repeated here.

TSR 2602 – Planescape Monstrous Compendium Appendix (1994) – ISBN 1-56076-862-2
Creature	Other appearances	Variants	Description
Animal Lord		Lizard Lord	
Baku			
Incarnates			
Mediator	Monstrous Compendium – Outer Planes Appendix (1991) (as Mediator)	Mechanus Mediator and translator	
Mephit, Air/Smoke		Air	
Mephit, Earth/Ooze		Earth and Ooze Mephit	
Mephit, Fire/Radiant		Radiant Mephit	
Mephit, Water/Ice		Water Mephit	
Mephit, Dust/Salt		Dust and Salt Mephit	
Mephit, Lightning/Mineral		Lightning and Mineral Mephit	
Mephit, Magma/Ash		Ash Mephit	
Tanar'ri, Greater – Wastrilith			
Tiefling			Descendants of a union between a human and a demon or devil; popular as player characters, as they allow for "identity tourism" of a racial outsider. Johnny L. Wilson called tieflings "the paranoid, loner obverse" of halflings, who "believe that life is out to get them". In the game they are "suited to be great thieves" and "point persons" due to favourable saving throw bonuses.

== TSR 2501 – Monstrous Compendium – Mystara Appendix (1994) ==
This appendix to the Monstrous Compendium series was designed for use with the Mystara campaign setting for the second edition of the Advanced Dungeons & Dragons game. The 128-page soft-bound book contains a two-pages content list, a 4-pages "How To Use This Book" section and 5 pages of random encounter charts, with the remainder consisting of the descriptions of the fictional monsters.

TSR 2501 – Monstrous Compendium – Mystara Appendix (1994) – ISBN 1-56076-875-4 The Mystara campaign setting began as the "Known World" in the D&D Basic and Expert rules, and as a result many of the entries below originated in the D&D Basic, Expert, Companion or Masters rulebooks, and the modules associated with them.
Creature	Other appearances	Variants	Description
Actaeon	D&D Master Rules (1985), D&D Rules Cyclopedia (1991)		
Agarat	D&D Expert Module X8 Drums on Fire Mountain (1984), Creature Catalogue (1986)		
Ash Crawler	D&D Companion Module CM5 Mystery of the Snow Pearls (1985), Creature Catalogue (1986), Creature Catalog (1993)		
Baldandar	Creature Catalogue (1986), Creature Catalog (1993)		
Bargda	Creature Catalogue (1986), Creature Catalog (1993)		
Bhut	D&D Expert Module X4 Master of the Desert Nomads (1985), Creature Catalogue (1986), Creature Catalog (1993), Fiend Folio (2003)		
Bird	Creature Catalogue (Magpie, Piranha Bird) (1986), Creature Catalog (Magpie, Piranha Bird) (1993), D&D Expert Module B5 Horror on the Hill (Piranha Bird) (1983), D&D Expert Module X6 Quagmire! (Piranha Bird) (1984), D&D Basic Module B1-9 "In Search of Adventure" (Piranha Bird) (1987), Wrath of the Immortals (Sprackle) (1992)	Magpie (common and giant), Piranha Bird (lesser and greater), and Sprackle (lesser and greater)	
Blackball	D&D Master Rules (1985), D&D Rules Cyclopedia (1991)		
Brain Collector	D&D Expert Module X2 Castle Amber (1981), Creature Catalogue (1986), Creature Catalog (1993), Monstrous Compendium Annual vol. 4 (1998), Epic Level Handbook (2002), Dungeon no. 144 (2007)		Also known as the Neh-thalggu.
Chevall	Creature Catalogue (1986), GAZ1: Grand Duchy of Karameikos (1987), GAZ5: Elves of Alfheim (1988), PC4: Night Howlers (1992), Creature Catalog (1993)		
Choker	GAZ6: Dwarves of Rockhome (1988), Creature Catalog (1993), Monster Manual (2000), Monster Manual (2003)		
Coltpixy	PC1: Tall Tales of the Wee Folk (1991), Creature Catalog (1993)		
Crone of Chaos	D&D Basic Module B8 Journey to the Rock (1984), Creature Catalogue (1986), D&D Expert Module B1-9 "In Search of Adventure" (1987), Creature Catalog (1993)		
Darkhood	Creature Catalogue (1986), Creature Catalog (1993)		
Darkwing			
Decapus	D&D Basic Module B3 Palace of the Silver Princess (1981), D&D Expert Module X9 Savage Coast (1985), Creature Catalogue (1986), D&D Expert Module B1-9 "In Search of Adventure" (1987), Creature Catalog (1993)		
Deep Glaurant	GAZ8: Five Shires (1988), Creature Catalog (1993)		
Diabolus	D&D Immortals set (1986), Wrath of the Immortals (1992), Terrors from Above (1998)		
Dragon, General			Powerful and intelligent, usually winged reptiles with magical abilities and breath weapon.
-- Dragon, Crystalline	D&D Master Rules (1985), D&D Rules Cyclopedia (1991)		
-- Dragon, Jade	D&D Master Rules (1985), D&D Rules Cyclopedia (1991)		Not to be confused with the Jade Dragon detailed in Monstrous Compendium Annual Volume One (1994).
-- Dragon, Onyx	D&D Master Rules (1985), D&D Rules Cyclopedia (1991)		
-- Dragon, Ruby	D&D Master Rules (1985), D&D Rules Cyclopedia (1991)		
Dragonfly	D&D Expert Module XL1 Quest for the Heartstone (1984), Creature Catalogue (1986), Creature Catalog (1993)	White, Black, Green, Blue and Red	
Drake, Mystaran		Mandrake, Wooddrake, Colddrake and Elemental Drake	D&D Master Rules (1985), D&D Rules Cyclopedia (1991)
Dusanu	D&D Expert Module X5 Temple of Death (1983), Creature Catalogue (1986), Creature Catalog (1993), Dragon no. 339 (2006)		
Elemental of Chaos, Air/Earth	D&D Companion Rules (1984), D&D Rules Cyclopedia (1991)	Eolian and Erdeen	
Elemental of Chaos, Fire/Water	D&D Companion Rules (1984), D&D Rules Cyclopedia (1991)	Pyrophor and Undine	
Elemental of Law, Air/Earth	D&D Companion Rules (1984), D&D Rules Cyclopedia (1991)	Anemo and Kryst	
Elemental of Law, Fire/Water	D&D Companion Rules (1984), D&D Rules Cyclopedia (1991)	Helion and Hydrax	
Familiar	Creature Catalogue (1986), Creature Catalog (1993)	Aryth, Bogan, Fylgar, Gretch and Ulzaq	Special versions of the companion which can be summoned by wizards, "with whom they share a deep bond—these can be useful in the role of spy or messenger".
Frost Salamander	D&D Expert Rules (1981, 1983), D&D Rules Cyclopedia (1991), Planescape – Monstrous Compendium Appendix III (1998), Monster Manual II (2002)	Frost Salamander and Ice Crab	
Fundamental, Air/Earth	D&D Expert Module X8 Drums on Fire Mountain (1984), Creature Catalogue (1986), Creature Catalog (1993), Planescape – Monstrous Compendium Appendix III (1998)	Air and Earth Fundamentals	
Fundamental, Fire/Water	Expert Module X8 Drums on Fire Mountain (1984), Creature Catalogue (1986), Creature Catalog (1993), Planescape – Monstrous Compendium Appendix III (1998)	Fire and Water Fundamentals	
Gargantua	D&D Companion Rules, D&D Rules Cyclopedia (1991) (carrion crawler and troll)	Gargantuan Carrion Crawler and Gargantuan Troll	
Geonid	Expert Module X5 Temple of Death (1983), Creature Catalogue (1986), DA3: City of the Gods (1987), Creature Catalog (1993)		
Ghostly Horde	D&D Basic Module B8 Journey to the Rock (1984), Creature Catalogue (1986), Creature Catalog (1993)		
Giant, Athach	D&D Master Rules (1985), D&D Rules Cyclopedia (1991), Monster Manual (2000), Monster Manual (2003)		
Giant, Hephaeston	D&D Companion Module CM6 Where Chaos Reigns (1986), Creature Catalogue (1986), Creature Catalog (1993)		
Golem, Amber/Skeletal	D&D Expert Rules (as Amber and Bone Golem) (1981, 1983), D&D Rules Cyclopedia (1991), D&D Game (1991), Classic D&D Game (1994)	Amber and Skeletal Golem	
Golem, Drolem	D&D Companion Rules, D&D Rules Cyclopedia (1991)		
Golem, Iron Gargoyle/Mud	D&D Expert Module X2 Castle Amber (1981) (Mud Golem), D&D Companion Rules (1984) (Mud Golem), Creature Catalogue (1986) (Iron Gargoyle), D&D Rules Cyclopedia (1991)(Mud Golem), Creature Catalog (1993) (Iron Gargoyle), Monster Manual III (2004) (Mud Golem)	Iron Gargoyle and Mud Golem	
Golem, Rock/Silver	Creature Catalogue (1986) (Rock, Silver Golem), Monstrous Compendium Dark Sun Appendix: Terrors of the Desert (1992), (Rock Golem) Creature Catalog (1993) (Rock, Silver Golem)	Rock and Silver Golem	
Gray Philosopher	Creature Catalogue (1986), Creature Catalog (1993)	Gray Philosopher and Malice	
Guardian Warrior	Creature Catalogue (1986), Creature Catalog (1993)	Guardian Warrior and Guardian Horse	
Gyerian	D&D Companion Module CM5 Mystery of the Snow Pearls (1985), Creature Catalogue (1986), Creature Catalog (1993)		
Herex	Creature Catalogue (1986), DA3: City of the Gods (1987), Creature Catalog (1993)	Larval and Adult Herex	
Hivebrood	Creature Catalogue (1986), Creature Catalog (1993)	Broodling, soldier, Lieutenant, Mother and Controller	
Horde	D&D Companion Rules (1984), D&D Rules Cyclopedia (1991)		
Hsiao	D&D Master Rules (1985)		
Huptzeen	Creature Catalogue (1986)		
Hutaakan	Creature Catalogue (1986), Creature Catalog (1993)	Priest, Warrior and Other Hutaakan	
Imp	Creature Catalogue (1986) (Wood Imp), PC1: Tall Tales of the Wee Folk (1991)(Wood Imp), Creature Catalog (1993) (Wood Imp)	Wood, Bog and Garden Imp	
Jellyfish, Giant	Creature Catalogue (1986) (Marauder), Creature Catalog (1993) (Marauder)	Marauder, Death's Head and Galley	
Kna	Creature Catalogue (1986), PC3: Sea Peoples (1990), Creature Catalog (1993)		
Kopru	D&D Expert Module X1 Isle of Dread (1981), Creature Catalogue (1986), Creature Catalog (1993), Monster Manual II (2002)		
Lizard	D&D Basic Rules (Draco, Gecko, Horned Chameleon, Tuatara), Rules Companion (1991)	Draco Lizard, Footpad (giant), Gecko (giant), Horned Chameleon, Lava Lizard, Rockhome Lizard, Tuatara (giant) and Xytar	
Lizard-kin	D&D Basic Module B8 Journey to the Rock (1984) (Chamelon Man), Creature Catalogue (1986) (Chamelon Man, Gator Man, Sis'thik), DA4: Duchy of Ten (1987) (Gator Man), D&D Expert Module B1-9 In Search of Adventure (1987) (Chamelon Man), Creature Catalog (1993) (Chamelon Man, Gator Man, Sis'thik), Savage Coast Monstrous Compendium Appendix (1996) (Cayman)	Cayman, Chameleon Man, Gator Man and Sis'thik	
Lupin	D&D Expert Module X2 Castle Amber (1982), D&D Expert Module X9 Savage Coast (1985), Creature Catalogue (1986), PC4: Night Howlers (1992), Creature Catalog (1993), Red Steel (1994), Savage Coast Monstrous Compendium Appendix (1996), Dragon no. 325 (2004)		
Lycanthrope, Werejaguar	HWR1: Sons of Azca (1991), PC4: Night Howlers (1992), Creature Catalog (1993)		
Lycanthrope, Wereswine	D&D Expert Rules (1981, 1983), D&D Rules Cyclopedia (1991)		Called "Devil Swine" in earlier appearances
Magen	D&D Expert Module X2 Castle Amber (1981), Creature Catalogue (1986), D&D Basic Adventure B12: Queen's Harvest (1989) (Caldron only), Creature Catalog (1993)	Demos, Caldron, Galvan and Hypnos	
Manikin	GAZ3: Principalities of Glantri (1987)		
Mek	D&D Master Rules (1985), D&D Rules Cyclopedia (1991)		
Mujina	D&D Companion Rules, D&D Expert Module X5 Temple of Death (1983), D&D Companion Rules (1984), D&D Rules Cyclopedia (1991), Rokugan Campaign Setting (2001)		
Nagpa	D&D Expert Module X4 Master of the Desert Nomads (1985), Creature Catalogue (1986), PC2: Top Ballista (1989), Creature Catalog (1993)		
Nightshade	D&D Master Rules (1985), D&D Rules Cyclopedia (1991), Monster Manual (2000), Monster Manual (2003)	Nightcrawler, Nightwalker and Nightwing	
Nuckalavee	D&D Master Rules (1985), D&D Rules Cyclopedia (1991), Dragon no. 343 (2006)		
Pegataur	Creature Catalogue (1986), Dawn of the Emperors (1989), PC2: Top Ballista (1991), M2: Vengeance of Alphaks (1991), Creature Catalog (1993), Monstrous Compendium Annual V3 (1996)		
Phanaton	D&D Expert Module X1 Isle of Dread (1981), Creature Catalogue (1986), D&D Master Module M5 Talons of Night (1987), Creature Catalog (1993), Dragon no. 339 (2006)		
Plant, Dangerous	D&D Basic Module B3 Palace of the Silver Princess (Archer Bush), D&D Expert Module X2 Castle Amber (1981) (Amber Lotus, Grab Grass, Vampire Rose), D&D Companion Rules (Grab Grass)	Amber Lotus, Archer Bush, Grab Grass and Vampire Rose	
Plasm	D&D Companion Rules (1984), D&D Rules Cyclopedia (1991)		
Rakasta	Savage Coast Monstrous Compendium Appendix (1996), D&D Expert Module X1 Isle of Dread (1981), D&D Expert Module X2 Castle Amber (1981), Creature Catalogue (1986), Champions of Mystara: Heroes of the Princess Ark (1993), Creature Catalog (1993), Rage of the Rakasta (1993), Red Steel (1994)		
Rock Man	D&D Expert Module B8 Journey to the Rock (1984), Creature Catalogue (1986), Creature Catalog (1993)		
Saberclaw	D&D Companion Module C3 Sabre River (1984), Creature Catalogue (1986), Creature Catalog (1993)		
Sacrol	D&D Master Module M2 Maze of the Riddling Minotaur (1983), D&D Expert Module X9 Savage Coast (1985), Creature Catalogue (1986), Creature Catalog (1993)		
Scamille	Creature Catalogue (1986), Creature Catalog (1993)		
Shapeshifter	D&D Basic Module B4 The Lost City (Polymar) (1982), D&D Master Rules (Adaptor, Metamorph) (1985), Creature Catalogue (Polymar, Randara) (1986), D&D Basic Module B1-9 In Search of Adventure (Polymar) (1987), D&D Rules Cyclopedia (Adaptor, Metamorph) (1991), Creature Catalog (Polymar, Randara) (1993)	Adaptor, Metamorph, Polymar and Randara	
Shargugh	D&D Expert Module O2 Blade of Vengeance (1984), Creature Catalogue (1986), Creature Catalog (1993)		
Shark-kin	Creature Catalogue (1986), PC3: Sea Peoples (1990), Creature Catalog (1993)		
Sollux	D&D Expert Module X2 Castle Amber (as Sun Brother) (1981), Creature Catalogue (1986), DA4: Duchy of Ten (1987), Creature Catalog (1993)		
Spectral Death			
Spectral Hound	D&D Expert Module X5 Temple of Death (1983), D&D Companion Rules, D&D Rules Cyclopedia (1991)		
Spider-kin	D&D Expert Module X1 Isle of Dread (Aranea) (1981), D&D Expert Module X2 Castle Amber (Aranea) (1981), D&D Expert Rules (Rhagodessa) (1981, 1983), D&D Master Rules (Planar Spider),(1985), Creature Catalogue (1986), D&D Master Module M5 Talons of Night (1987), Rules Cyclopedia (Planar Spider, Rhagodessa) (1991), Wrath of the Immortals (Ploppéd) (1992), Champions of Mystara: Heroes of the Princess Ark (Aranea) (1993), Red Steel (Aranea) (1994), Monster Manual (Aranea) (2003)	Aranea, Planar Spider, Ploppéd and Rhagodessa	Aranea not to be confused with similar creature defined in Monstrous Compendium Annual Volume Three (1996), Savage Coast Monstrous Compendium Appendix (1996)
Spirit	D&D Companion Rules (Druj and Odic) (1984), D&D Rules Cyclopedia (Druj and Odic) (1991)	Druj and Odic	
Statue, Living	D&D Basic Rules (Crystal, Iron, Rock) (1981, 1983), D&D Basic Module B10 Night's Dark Terror (Jade, Ooze, Silver, Steel) (1986), Creature Catalogue (Jade, Ooze, Silver, Steel) (1986), D&D Rules Cyclopedia (Crystal, Iron, Rock) (1991), Creature Catalog (Jade, Ooze, Silver, Steel) (1993)	Crystal, Iron, Jade, Rock, Ooze, Silver and Steel	
Surtaki	Creature Catalogue (1986), Creature Catalog (1993)		
Tabi	D&D Expert Module X4 Master of the Desert Nomads (1983), D&D Expert Module X10 Red Arrow, Black Shield (1985), Creature Catalogue (1986), PC2: Top Ballista (1989), Creature Catalog (1993)		
Thoul	D&D Basic Rules (1981, 1983), D&D Rules Cyclopedia (1991), D&D Game (1991), Classic D&D Game (1993)		Cross between ghoul, troll and hobgoblin. Originally conceived by Gary Gygax, he thought it "a fun and nasty beastie".
Thunderhead	Creature Catalogue (1986), Creature Catalog (1993)		
Tiger, Ebon	Rage of the Rakasta (1993)		
Topi	D&D Expert Module X8 Drums on Fire Mountain (1984), Creature Catalogue (1986)		
Tortle	D&D Expert Module X9 Savage Coast (1985), Creature Catalogue (1986), Creature Catalog (1993), Red Steel (1994), Savage Coast Monstrous Compendium Appendix (1996), Dragon no. 315 (2004)	Tortle and Snapper	A "turtle-like race" of humanoids which were also available as player characters.
Vampire, Velya	D&D Expert Module X7 War Rafts of Kron (1984), Creature Catalogue (1986), D&D Companion Module CM9 Legacy of Blood (as Swamp Velya) (1987), Creature Catalog (1993)		
White Fang	Creature Catalogue (1986), Creature Catalog (1993)		
Worm	D&D Expert Rules (Caecilia) (1981, 1983), D&D Expert Module X2 Castle Amber (Slime Worm) (1981), Creature Catalogue (Fyrsnaca, Red Worm) (1986), D&D Expert Adventure XS2: Thunderdelve Mountain (Fyrsnaca, Red Worm) (1989), D&D Basic Adventure B11: King's Festival (Red Worm) (1989), HWA1: Nightwail (Great Annelid) (1990), HWA2: Nightrage (Great Annelid) (1990), D&D Rules Cyclopedia (Caecilia) (1991), Creature Catalog (yrsnaca, Great Annelid, Red Worm) (1993)	Great Annelid, Caecilia, Fyrsnaca, Desert Leviathan, Marine Leviathan, Red Worm and Slime Worm	
Wyrd	D&D Basic Module B10 Night's Dark Terror (1986), Creature Catalogue (Greater) (1986), GAZ5: Elves of Alfheim (Greater) (1988), Creature Catalog (Greater) (1993)	Lesser and Greater	
Yowler	Creature Catalogue (1986), Creature Catalog (1993)		
Zombie, Lightning	Wrath of the Immortals (1992)	Lesser and Greater	

== TSR 2153 – Monstrous Compendium – Ravenloft Appendix III: Creatures of Darkness (1994) ==
This 126-page soft-bound book contains additional creatures for the Ravenloft campaign setting for the second edition of the Advanced Dungeons & Dragons game. The book also contains an introduction page, a 2-page "How to Use This Book" section, an updated table for the calculation of experience points awarded for new or modified creatures, and a single page listing of creatures from other sources appropriate to the Ravenloft setting.

Luis Javier Flores Arvizu named the continuous presence of supernatural beings as one of the factors that made Ravenloft a very well received role-playing game setting during the 33 years of its existence.

TSR 2153 – Monstrous Compendium – Ravenloft Appendix III: Creatures of Darkness (1994) – ISBN 1-56076-914-9
Creature	Other appearances	Variants	Description
Akikage		Akikage and Anasasshia	The undead spirit of a ninja who died during an important, unfulfilled mission of assassination. Anasasshia are akikage enslaved by powerful spellcasters.
Animator, General Information			Malevolent spirit creatures which can possess inanimate objects to attack and harm the living.
--Animator, Minor			An animator which can take over only light items (daggers, ropes etc.).
--Animator, Common			A type of animator which can possess larger-sized objects, i.e. coaches, stoves etc.
--Animator, Greater			A type of animator which possesses huge-sized structures (houses or ships) and possesses additional magical powers.
Bakhna Rakhna			Creatures looking like albino goblins who make a living as stealthy raiders.
Baobhan Sith			Descendants of a cursed pixie clan captured by the powers of Ravenloft who play evil tricks on their victims.
Beetle, Scarab		Grave, Giant and Monstrous	Flesh-eating beetles which (except for the monstrous variant) overwhelms their victims by swarming.
Boneless			A type of zombie who had their bones removed prior to animation, making them very flexible.
Boowray			A spirit creature which attaches itself to a person and prompts them into committing acts of evil, to be ultimately corrupted by the dark powers.
Bruja			Good-aligned variants of common hags cursed with foresight of their own deaths.
Carrion Stalker			Horseshoe crab-like creatures which inhabits corpses and attacks to snare passing creatures for use in reproducing their species.
Carrionette	The Created (1993), Monstrous Compendium Annual vol. 1 (1994), Denizens of Darkness (2002), Denizens of Dread (2004), Dragon no. 339 (2006)		Animated, evil puppets which seek to switch their bodies with those of other persons, while their victims' spirits are trapped inside their original puppet bodies.
Cat, Midnight			
Cat, Skeletal			
Cloaker, Shadow			
Cloaker, Resplendent			
Cloaker, Undead			
Corpse Candle			
Death's Head Tree	Castles Forlorn (1993), Monstrous Compendium Annual vol. 1 (1994), Dragon no. 292 (2002), Denizens of Darkness (2002), Denizens of Dread (2004), Dragon no. 339 (2006)		
Doppleganger, Ravenloft			
Furies		Alecto, Tisiphone and Megarea	Three malicious entities who haunt and punish those who try to turn away from their corruption by the dark powers of Ravenloft. Based on the Furies of Greek mythology.
Familiar, Pseudo-			
Familiar, Undead			
Feathered Serpent			Animal studies scholar Matthew Chrulew observed that in contrast to more harmless animals the game dedicated space to "serpents, and their monstrous kin" as creatures which "are, indeed, monstrous in the powerful, predatory sense" and among "the most Nietzschean of animals".
Fenhound			
Figurine, General Information			Lesser type of golems infused by the dark powers of Ravenloft during their creation process. First created in the domain of Sri Raji.
--Figurine, Ceramic			Ravenloft figurines shaped like reptilians or amphibians which attack by spitting liquids stored in their body cavities.
--Figurine, Crystal		Crystal and Diamond	Ravenloft figurines shaped like insects or arachnids with light-reflecting abilities.
--Figurine, Ivory			Ravenloft figurines shaped like pachyderms which can enlarge themselves.
--Figurine, Obsidian		Smoothed	Ravenloft figurines shaped like apes or monkeys. Standard Obsidian Figurines have jagged surfaces for increased damage; smoothed figurines are capable of storing magic spells provided by their creator.
--Figurine, Porcelain			Ravenloft figurines shaped like great cats who can enlarge and shoot life-draining beams from their eyes.
Flea of Madness	Adam's Wrath (1994)		A type of flea indigenous to Ravenloft whose bite inflicts insanity, causing victims to behave abnormally.
Geist			Intangible undead spirit of a person that died traumatically. Inspired by Gothic fiction, considered a fitting monster for the nightmarish domains of Ravenloft by scholar Mauricio Rangel Jiménez.
Ghost, Animal		Bear, Wild Boar, Wild Horse, Mountain Lion, Stag and Wolf	Spirit of an animal turned to a malevolent undead. A characteristic monster for the horror-setting of Ravenloft.
Golem, Ravenloft Flesh	Monstrous Manual (1993), Adam's Wrath (1994)		More powerful version of the Monstrous Manual flesh golem. Inspired by Gothic fiction, a typical denizen of the Ravenloft setting.
Golem, Mist			A type of golem which is accidentally created when a magic-user directly taps into Ravenloft's essence to create a more traditional golem. Inspired by Gothic fiction, a typical denizen of the Ravenloft setting.
Golem, Snow	Ship of Horror (1991)		A type of golem created from solidified snow. Inspired by Gothic fiction, a typical denizen of the Ravenloft setting.
Golem, Wax			A type of golem which can drain the memories of the victims it is made to resemble to take its place in society. Inspired by Gothic fiction, a typical denizen of the Ravenloft setting.
Gremishka			A variant of the common gremlin which lives in swarms and lairs under the floors of a house.
Hag, Spectral			The undead spirit of a common hag who died performing an evil ceremony and refused to accept death, perpetuating the evils it has committed in its life.
Head Hunter			A spider-like monster with an abdomen looking like a human head. Its sharp web filaments are used to set traps which behead victims, enabling the head hunter to inhabit their corpses and feed on its internal organs.
Hebi-No-Onna			Creatures looking like Oriental women who have snakes for arms and are powerful enchantresses.
Hearth Fiend			Non-corporeal creatures which can possess fires of any size and hypnotize victims into feeding them flesh.
Hound, Phantom			
Hound, Skeletal			Animated skeletons of normal dogs.
Imp, Wishing			A unique creature looking like the stone statuette of a demon. Can fulfill wishes, but their outcome is habitually perverted to cause as much damage as possible to its owner.
Ivy, Crawling			
Jack Frost			
Jolly Roger			The undead spirit of a pirate which can induce deadly laughing fits in its opponents.
Kizoku			A type of Oriental vampire which feeds on the spirits of women it can seduce into murdering their husbands.
Lashweed			
Leech, Magical			
Leech, Psionic			
Lich, Defiler			
Lich, Drow		Drow and Drider	
Lich, Elemental			
Lich, Psionic	Dragon no. 174 (1991), Van Richten's Guide to the Lich (1993), Monstrous Compendium Annual vol. 1 (1994), Van Richten's Monster Hunter's Compendium, Volume Two (1999), Ravenloft Dungeon Master's Guide (2003) (as "Psilich")		
Living Tattoo		Dark Man, Living Spear, Panther, Raven and Winged Snake	A tattoo imbued with a spirit, enabling it to detach from its wearer's skin to aid him. However, some tattoos can become inhabited by malevolent spirits which seek to kill their wearer. The secret of their creation is exclusively known to the Nightmare Lands' Abber Nomads.
Lycanthrope, Loup-Garou		Lowland and Mountain	An especially powerful version of a werewolf. The werewolf was considered a typical monster for the horror-setting of Ravenloft.
Lycanthrope, Werejackal			
Lycanthrope, Werejaguar	Dragon no. 40 (1980), Dragon no. 70 (1983), Imagine no. 28 (1985), Sons of Azca (1991), Night Howlers (1992), Creature Catalog (1993), Van Richten's Guide to Werebeasts (1993), Mystara Monstrous Compendium Appendix (1994), Monstrous Compendium Annual vol. 1 (1994), Denizens of Darkness (2002), Denizens of Dread (2004)		Jungle-dwelling lycanthropes who, while neutrally aligned, are xenophobic and hunt down strangers entering their territories.
Lycanthrope, Wereleopard			Lycanthropes descended from a pack of common leopards which were led into committing acts of evil and then drawn into Ravenloft.
Lycanthrope, Wereray			Ocean-dwelling lycanthropes looking like a blending of humanoid and manta rays.
Mist Ferryman			
Moor Man			Evil, swamp-dwelling humanoids who can bestow themselves with enhanced abilities by means of temporary mud tattoos.
Obedient			Normal people, usually commoners, from the realm of Dementlieu who have been enslaved by darklord Dominic d'Honaire's hypnotic powers.
Odem			A malevolent undead spirit which possess the bodies of any beings of great potential for fear or violence and control their actions against their victims' will.
Paka			An evil race of humanoids capable of shifting into fully human and human/cat hybrid forms. They hate a fierce hatred for humans.
Plant, Bloodrose			
Plant, Fearweed			
Radiant Spirit			
Recluse			
Remnant, Aquatic			
Rushlight			
Sea Spawn, Master			
Sea Spawn, Minion			
Shadow Asp			
Shattered Brethren			
Skeleton, Archer			A variant of undead skeletons using bone arrows which can create new skeletons if they miss their targets.
(Skeleton), Insectoid		Giant Ant, Giant Tick and Stag Beetle	
Skeleton, Strahd			A variant of undead skeletons originally created by Strahd von Zarovich.
Skin Thieves			Evil, beast-like humanoids who use their overlong claws to claim and wear their victims' skins as a disguise.
Spirit, Psionic			
Unicorn, Shadow			
Vampire, Drow			
Vampire, Nosferatu	Dungeon Magazine #42 (1993), Dungeon Magazine #50 (1994)		A variant of the common D&D vampire which feeds on blood instead of life force.
Vampire, Oriental			A type of vampire which can make itself invisible.
Virus, General Information			Six types of extremely virulent magical pathogens created by an evil, control-obsessed sorcerer from the domain of Invidia who drove his oppressed children into poisoning him. Before dying, he ingested the viruses, infecting his children when they touched his corpse and making them their first carriers. The remains of their victims also carry the disease, making contact with them deadly hazardous.
--Virus, Combustion and Crystal		Combustion and Crystal	Combustion virus: A virus which eventually causes its victims' bodies to self-immolate. Crystal virus: A virus which gradually transforms the victim's flesh into crystal.
--Virus, Petrification and Phobia		Petrification and Phobia	Petrification virus: A virus which transforms the victim's flesh to stone. Phobia virus: a virus which induces severe phobias.
--Virus, Psionic and Shadow		Psionic and Shadow	Psionic virus: A virus which enhances its victims' brains, endowing them with psionic abilities until its brain gives out from psychic overload. Shadow virus: A virus which first consumes its victim's shadow and then transforms their flesh into shadow.
Vorlog			A victim of a special form of vampirism which is intended to create a mating bond with a master vampire, who is destroyed before the process is completed. Caught between life and undeath, a vorlog spends its existence looking for a surrogate for its lost intended vampire mate.
Will O'Dawn			
Will O'Deep			
Will O'Mist			
Will O'Sea			
Zombie, Cannibal			A type of zombie which can infect victims of its bite with a disease which eventually kills them and turns them into new cannibal zombies.
Zombie, Desert	Touch of Death (1991)		A special variant of zombie created by the greater mummy Semnet, with the ability to burrow under the desert sands.
Zombie Fog		Zombie Fog and Cadaver	A non-corporeal, mist-like creature which feeds on the psychic energies of creatures dying in its vicinity and can animate the corpses of its victims as cadavers to overwhelm new victims.
Zombie, Strahd			A variant of the common zombie originally created by Strahd von Zarovich, notorious for their ability to keeps severed body parts animated until it is destroyed.
Zombie, Wolf	Castles Forlorn (1993), Monstrous Compendium Annual vol. 1 (1994), Ravenloft Gazetteer: Volume I (2002), Libris Mortis (2004)		

== Monstrous Compendium Annuals ==
Monstrous Compendium Annuals collected and updated monsters published in a variety of sources. Creatures listed under the heading of earlier publications are not repeated here.

=== Volume One ===
This 128-page unnumbered soft-bound book primarily contains monster descriptions published in TSR's products for the Advanced Dungeons & Dragons second edition game in 1993, fictional monsters of the same year from magazines affiliated with the game, as well as creatures from earlier sources. The book also contains a two-page How to Use This Book section, a revised table for calculating experience points, and two pages of tips on how to use monsters in the game in the section Beyond Random Encounters.

TSR 2145 – Monstrous Compendium Annual Volume One (1994) – ISBN 1-56076-838-X
Creature	Other appearances	Variants	Description
Abyss Ants	Dragon no. 193 (1993), Fiend Folio (2003)		
Banelar	Dragon no. 197 (1993), Monsters of Faerûn (2001), Serpent Kingdoms (2004), Forgotten Realms Campaign Guide (2008)		
Campestri	Dungeon no. 41 (1993)		A "singing mushroom", considered a fun and whimsy creature in the game by Chris Perkins.
Dragon, Linnorm, Corpse Tearer	Dragon no. 183 (1992), Monster Manual II (2002)		Reviewer Mark Theurer remarked about Linnorm dragons that these giant "dragon-like beings that might best be described as feral dragons" really piqued his interest, and characterized the Corpse Tearer as "old, smart, and vicious".
Dragon, Linnorm, Dread	Dragon no. 182 (1992), Monster Manual II (2002)		The "largest [of the Linnorms] and has two frickin' heads".
Dragon, Linnorm, Flame	Dragon no. 183 (1992)		
Dragon, Linnorm, Forest	Dragon no. 182 (1992)		
Dragon, Linnorm, Frost	Dragon no. 182 (1992)		
Dragon, Linnorm, Gray	Dragon no. 183 (1992), Monster Manual II (2002)		"small [for a Linnorm dragon], that means HUGE, and very aggressive".
Dragon, Linnorm, Land	Dragon no. 182 (1992)		
Dragon, Linnorm, Midgard	Dragon no. 183 (1992)		
Dragon, Linnorm, Rain	Dragon no. 183 (1992)		
Dragon, Linnorm, Sea	Dragon no. 182 (1992), Dragon no. 356 (2007)		
Dragon, Neutral, Jacinth	Dragon no. 158 (1990)		
Dragon, Neutral, Jade	Dragon no. 158 (1990)		Note that this is not the same dragon as the Mystaran Jade Dragon.
Dragon, Neutral, Pearl	Dragon no. 158 (1990)		
Dragon-kin	Dragon Mountain (1993), Cult of the Dragon (1998), Pool of Radiance: Attack on Myth Drannor (2000), Monsters of Faerûn (2001), Draconomicon (2003)		
Elemental, Earth Weird	Dragon Mountain (1993), Monster Manual II (2002)		
Faerie, Petty	Dragon Mountain (1993)	Squeaker	Fairy creatures were considered among the "standard repertoire of 'Monsters'" by Fabian Perlini-Pfister.
Flameskull	Dragon no. 197 (1993), Lost Empires of Faerûn (2004), D&D Miniatures: War Drums set #29 (2006), Monster Manual (2008)		
Foulwing	Menzoberranzan (1992), Dragon no. 197 (1993), Lost Empires of Faerûn (2005)	Foulwing and Foulvern	
Genie, Tasked, General			
Gnasher	Dragon Mountain (1993)	Normal and Winged Gnasher	
Golem, Brain	Dragon no. 193 (1993), The Illithiad (1998), Fiend Folio (2003)		
Golem, Hammer	Dragon no. 193 (1993)		
Golem, Metagolem	Dragon no. 159 (1990), Dungeon no. 36 (1992)	Copper, Tin, Bronze, Iron, Steel, Silver, Electrum, Gold and Platinum Metagolem	
Golem, Spiderstone	Dragon no. 193 (1993), City of the Spider Queen (2002)		
Gorynych	Dragon no. 158 (1990), Lost Empires of Faerûn (2005)		
Greelox	Dungeon no. 35 (1992)		
Jarbo	Dungeon no. 35 (1992)		
Laraken	Shining South (1993), Shining South (2004)		
Living Steel	Dragon Mountain (1993)		
Lycanthrope, Loup du Noir	Dark of the Moon (1993)		
Lycanthrope, Werebadger	Dragon no. 40 (1980), Van Richten's Guide to Werebeasts (1993), Van Richten's Monster Hunter's Compendium, Volume One (1999), Denizens of Darkness (2002), Denizens of Dread (2004)		
Mimic, House Hunter	Dungeon no. 19 (1989)	Young, Adult and Ancient House Hunter	Rob Bricken of io9 identified the house hunter as one of "The 12 Most Obnoxious Dungeons & Dragons Monsters".
Nautilus, Giant	Dragon no. 193 (1993)		
Nightshade	Doom of Daggerdale (1993)		Also called a wood wose; not to be confused with the various Nightshades from the Plane of Shadow.
Noran	Dragon Mountain (1993)		
Ophidian	Monster Manual II (1983), Dragon Mountain (1993), Fiend Folio (2003), Serpent Kingdoms (2004), D&D Miniatures: Angelfire set #57 (2005)		
Plant, Vampire Moss	Dungeon no. 41 (1993)		
Pteraman	Jungles of Chult (1993), Villains' Lorebook (1998), Monsters of Faerûn (2001) (from here on as pterafolk), Serpent Kingdoms (2004)		A flying saurian folk
Rautym	Dragon Mountain (1993)		
Shadeling	Dungeon no. 35 (1992)		
Snake, Stone	Dragon Mountain (1993)		
Spectral Wizard	Wizard's Challenge (1992), Wizard's Spell Compendium, Volume One (1996)		
Spell Weaver	Dragon no. 163 (1990), Monster Manual II (2002), Dragon no. 338 "The Ecology of the Spell Weaver" (2005), Dragon: Monster Ecologies (2007)		
Spider, Brain	Dragon Mountain (1993)		
Suwyze	Dragon Mountain (1993)		
Tick, Heart	None		
Tree, Dark	Shining South (1993), Monsters of Faerûn (2001), Shining South (2004)		
Troll, Snow	Dungeon no. 43 (1993)		
Tuyewera	Dungeon no. 22 (1990)		
Ulitharid (Noble Illithid)	Dungeon no. 24 (1990), The Illithiad (1998), Lords of Madness (2005)		A stronger mindflayer which comparatively can provide a significantly more challenging encounter.
Undead Dwarf	Dragon Mountain (1993)		
Undead Lake Monster	Castles Forlorn (1993), Ravenloft Gazetteer: Volume I (2002)		
Whipsting	Dragon no. 197 (1993)	Stingwings	
Wolf, Dread	Dragon no. 174 (1991)		
Wolf, Stone	Dragon no. 174 (1991)		
Wolf, Vampiric	Dragon no. 174 (1991)		
Wraith, Shimmering	Dungeon no. 26 (1990)		

=== Volume Two ===
This 128-page soft-bound book contains creatures appearing in various TSR publications (magazines, game accessories, etc.) in the year 1994. It contains a 2-page "How to Use This Book" section, and a 1-page section updating the calculation of experience points awarded for defeating various creatures (including tables updating those in the AD&D Dungeon Master's Guide). The final 10 pages of the book provide tables for generating random encounters, summoned creatures and NPC parties.

TSR 2158 – Monstrous Compendium Annual Volume Two (1995) – ISBN 0-7869-0199-3
Creature	Other appearances	Variants	Description
Aboleth, Savant	Night Below (1995)		
Arch-Shadow	The Secret of Spiderhaunt (1995), The Return of Randal Morn (1995)	Arch-Shadow and Demi-Shade	
Automaton, Scaladar	Ruins of Undermountain (1991) (Scaladar), Ruins of Undermountain 2 (1994) Enhanced Scaladar) City of Splendors: Waterdeep (2005) (Scaladar)	Scaladar and Enhanced Scaladar	
Automaton, Triobriand's	Ruins of Undermountain 2 (1994)	Ferragam, Silversann and Thanatar	
Bat, Sporebat			
Bi-nou	Ruins of Undermountain 2 (1994)	Bi-nou, Rockworm and Rocklord	
Boggle			
Brownie, Dobie	Dragon no. 206 (1994)		Inspired by the brownie from Scottish folklore.
Cat, Great (Cath Shee)	Elves of Evermeet (1994)		
Cat, Crypt	The Awakening (1994)	Normal and Large	
Centaur-Kin, Dorvesh	Polyhedron no. 95 (1994)		
Centaur-Kin, Gnoat	Polyhedron no. 95 (1994)		
Centaur-Kin, Ha'pony	Polyhedron no. 95 (1994)		
Centaur-Kin, Zebranaur	Polyhedron no. 95 (1994)		
Dog, Bog Hound	Howls in the Night (1994)		
Dragon, Brine	Otherlands (1990)		Ocean-going dragon with plesiosaur-like body and corrosive alkaline breath weapon.
Dragon, Half-Dragon	Council of Wyrms (1994) (as race)		
Dwarf, Wild	FR11: Dwarves Deep (1990)		
Ekimmu	Dragon no. 210 (1994)		
Elemental, Nature	Ruins of Zhentil Keep (1995)		
Elf, Winged (Avariel)	Dragon no. 51 (1981), Complete Elves Handbook (1992)		
Fish	Flames of the Falcon (1990)	Floating Eye, Hetfish, Masher and Verme	
Fish, Subterranean	Ruins of Undermountain 2 (1994)	Wattley, Lemon Fish and Iridescent Plecoe	
Flareater	Ruins of Undermountain 2 (1994)		
Flumph	Fiend Folio (1981)	Common and Monastic	"A flumph looks like a large jellyfish that propels itself through the air by sucking air into its body and expelling it." Ranked among the weakest monsters in the game by Scott Baird from Screen Rant: It only attacks with a stinking liquid, and is helpless when turned on its back. Shannon Applecline considered "the much-satirized flumph" one of the silly monsters introduced in Fiend Folio.
Froghemoth	Monster Manual II (1983), Dungeon no. 56 (1995), Volo's Guide to Monsters (2016)		Reviewer Cameron Kunzelmann found the froghemoth, a large amphibious predator, a straightforward monster without need for detailed background.
Ghost, Casura	Dragon no. 210 (1994)		
Ghost, Ker	Dragon no. 210 (1994)		
Golem, Burning Man	Dragon no. 209 (1994)		
Golem, Phantom Flyer	Dragon no. 209 (1994)		
Horse, Moon-horse	Elves of Evermeet (1994)		
Human, Dragon Slayer			NPC variant
Human, Vistana			A "group of strange, nomadic people with great mystical power, especially in the areas of curses and prophecy" from the Ravenloft setting, matching harmful stereotypes of Romani people in a problematic way.
Jellyfish, Giant (Portuguese Man-o-War)			
Kholiathra	Elves of Evermeet (1994)		
Laerti	Anauroch (1991)	Laerti and Stingtail	
Lich, Suel	Polyhedron no. 101 (1994)		
Lurker, Shadow	Ruins of Undermountain 2 (1994)		
Lycanthrope, Werepanther			
Mammal, Giant		Badger, Beaver, Boar, Hyena (Hyenadon), Porcupine, Otter, Skunk, Weasel and Wolverine	
Mammal, Herd		Bull (Wild Ox), Caribou, Giant Goat, Hippopotamus, Llama, Giant Ram, Rhinoceros, Wild Stag and Giant Stag	
Marl			
Meenlock	Fiend Folio (1981), Flames of the Falcon (1990)		
Mimic, Greater	Ruins of Undermountain 2 (1994)		
Mold	Ruins of Undermountain 2 (1994)	Deep, Gray and Death	In the artificial dungeon environment of the game, molds function as a "clean up crew"; environmental humanities scholar Matthew Chrulew considered molds typical flora within the game's "dungeon ecology".
Mummy, Creature		Animal and Monster	Based on the creature from Gothic fiction, a typical denizen of the Ravenloft setting.
Plant, Dangerous		Bloodthorn, Twilight Bloom and Boring Grass	
Pleistocene Animal		Irish Deer	
Pudding, Subterranean	Ruins of Undermountain 2 (1994)	Stone, Gray and Dense	
Snake, Serpent Vine	Ruins of Undermountain 2 (1994)		Animal studies scholar Matthew Chrulew observed that in contrast to more harmless animals the game dedicated space to "serpents, and their monstrous kin" as creatures which "are, indeed, monstrous in the powerful, predatory sense" and among "the most Nietzschean of animals".
Sphinx, Draco-	Old Empires (1990)		
Sprite, Seelie Faerie	Spellbound (1995)		Fairy creatures were considered among the "standard repertoire of 'Monsters'" by Fabian Perlini-Pfister.
Sprite, Unseelie Faerie	Spellbound (1995)		Fairy creatures were considered among the "standard repertoire of 'Monsters'" by Fabian Perlini-Pfister.
Squealer	Monster Manual II (1983)		
Webbird	Monster Manual II (1983)		
Wraith-Spider	Ruins of Undermountain 2 (1994)		
Zorbo	Monster Manual II (1983)		

=== Volume Three ===
This 128-page soft-bound book contains creatures appearing in various TSR publications (magazines, game accessories, etc.) in the year 1995. It contains a 3-page "How to Use This Book" section, which includes an updated table for the calculation of experience points awarded for defeating various creatures. The final 8 pages of the book contain an index of the creatures presented in the Monstrous Manual and the first three Monstrous Compendium Annuals.

TSR 2166 – Monstrous Compendium Annual Volume Three (1996) – ISBN 0-7869-0449-6
Creature	Other appearances	Variants	Description
Banedead	Ruins of Zhentil Keep (1995)		
Banelich	Ruins of Zhentil Keep (1995)		
Beetle		Stink	
Bvanen	The Wanderer's Chronicle: Windriders of the Jagged Cliffs (1995)		
Cat, Great, Snow Tiger	Spellbound (1995)		
Chosen One	Spellbound (1995), Wizard's Spell Companion Volume I (1996)		
Disenchanter	Fiend Folio (1981), Pages from the Mages (1995)		
Dragon, Ghost Dragon	Polyhedron no. 76 (1992), Cult of the Dragon (1998)		A "dragon that lingers after its death because it has such a deep attachment to its hoard".
Dragon, Neutral – Amber			
Dread Warrior	Spellbound (1995)		
Dream Spawn, General	The Nightmare Lands (1995)		
Dream Spawn, Greater – Ennui	The Nightmare Lands (1995)		
Dream Spawn, Lesser – Morph	The Nightmare Lands (1995)	Gray and Shadow	
Dreamweaver	The Nightmare Lands (1995)		
Dwarf, Arctic – Inugaakalikurit	Great Glacier (1992)		
Eel, Giant Moray	Night Below (1995)		
Elemental Fire-Kin – Tome Guardian	Pages from the Mages (1995)		
Elf, Rockseer	Night Below (1995)		
Faerie, Faerie Fiddler	Dragon no. 206 (1994)		Fairy creatures were considered among the "standard repertoire of 'Monsters'" by Fabian Perlini-Pfister.
Faerie, Petty – Bramble	Dragon no. 206 (1994)		Fairy creatures were considered among the "standard repertoire of 'Monsters'" by Fabian Perlini-Pfister.
Faerie, Petty – Gorse	Dragon no. 180 (1992)		Fairy creatures were considered among the "standard repertoire of 'Monsters'" by Fabian Perlini-Pfister.
Gargoyle	Dragon no. 223 (1995)	Archer, Spouter, Stone Lion and Grandfather Plaque	
Golem, Magic	Ruins of Zhentil Keep (1995)		
Golem, Shaboath	Night Below (1995)		
Hag, Bheur	Spellbound (1995)		
Head, Arcane	The Nightmare Lands (1995)		
Hound of Ill-Omen	Fiend Folio (1981)		
Human, Cerilian		Anurien (Knight), Brecht (Tradesman), Khinasi (Soldier), Rjurik (Berserker) and Vos (Mercenary)	
Hybsil	Ruins of Zhentil Keep (1995)		
Ixitxachitl, Ixzan	Night Below (1995)		
Jabberwock			
Life-Shaped Creations: Guardians	The Wanderer's Chronicle: Windriders of the Jagged Cliffs (1995)	Climbdog, Darkstrike, Protector, Shieldbug and Watcher	
Life-Shaped Creations: Transport	The Wanderer's Chronicle: Windriders of the Jagged Cliffs (1995)	Ber-ethern, Yihn-eflan, Gon-evauth and Dhev-sahr	
Lycanthrope, Werecrocodile	Old Empires (1990)		
Lycanthrope, Werespider			
Magedoom	Ruins of Zhentil Keep (1995)		
Manotaur	Greyhawk Ruins (1990)		
Mastiff, Shadow	Tales of the Lance (1992), Mordenkainen Presents: Monsters of the Multiverse		"nasty, quasi-canine predators from the Shadowfell" (in 2nd edition, the Shadow Plane) with various supernatural abilities.
Mist, Scarlet Dancer	Ruins of Zhentil Keep (1995)		
Orc, Neo-orog	Spellbound (1995)	Red and Black	
Orc, Ondonti	Ruins of Zhentil Keep (1995)		
Owlbear	Dragon no. 215 (1995)	Arctic and Winged	
Phaerimm	Anauroch (1991), Netheril: Empire of Magic (1996)		
Reggelid	The Wanderer's Chronicle: Windriders of the Jagged Cliffs (1995)		
Render	Ruins of Zhentil Keep (1995)		
Scalamagdrion	Pages from the Mages (1995)		
Snake, Messenger	Ruins of Zhentil Keep (1995)		
Spirit, Forest – Uthraki	Spellbound (1995)		
Spirit, Forest – Wood Man	Spellbound (1995)		
Spirit, Ice – Orglash	Spellbound (1995)		
Spirit, Rock – Thomil	Spellbound (1995)		
Tomb Tapper – Thaalud	Anauroch (1991), Netheril: Empire of Magic (1996)		
Undead Dragon Slayer	Dragon no. 205 (1994)		
Unicorn, Black	Spellbound (1995)		
Weredragon			
Zhentarim Spirit	Ruins of Zhentil Keep (1995)		

=== Volume Four ===
This 96-page soft-bound book contains creatures appearing in various TSR publications (magazines, game accessories, etc.). Unlike the previous annuals, the included monsters are not primarily drawn from the previous year's publications, but span a wide variety of years, possibly because TSR's financial woes resulted in very few products being produced in 1997. Also in a departure from the first three annuals, Volume Four includes a reference to the original appearance of the creature on each page. The Annual also contains a 3-page "How to Use This Book" section, which includes updated tables for the calculation of experience points awarded for defeating various creatures, and a 2-page index.

TSR 2173 – Monstrous Compendium Annual Volume Four (1998) – ISBN 0-7869-1212-X
Creature	Other appearances	Variants	Description
Bainligor	Dragon no. 227 (1996)	Young, Adult, Middle-aged, Elderly, Revered	
Beast of Chaos	The Rod of Seven Parts (1996)		
Blindheim	Fiend Folio (1981), Dragon no. 339 (2006)	Normal and Advanced	
Bloodsipper (Far Realm)	The Gates of Firestorm Peak (1996)		
Carapace	Dragon no. 227 (1996)		An "aggressive, mobile fungus", reviewer Philippe Tessier counted the carapace among those critters which never stopped moving him.
Clam, Giant	Dragon no. 116 (1986), Dragon no. 190 (1993), Tome of Horrors (2002)	Giant Clam (Oyster) and Carnivorous Scallop	
Coral	Dragon no. 116 (1986) (Brain Coral), Nehwon (1990) (Death Coral and Giant Coral)	Brain Coral and Coral Worm	
Darklore	Hellbound: The Blood War (1996)		
Dharculus (Far Realm)	The Gates of Firestorm Peak (1996), A Guide to the Ethereal Plane (1998), Planar Handbook (2004)		
Dragon, Neutral – Moonstone	None		
Dragon, Prismatic	Dungeon no. 51 (1995)		Ranked among the strongest monsters in the game by Scott Baird from Screen Rant: In its eldest version it "represents the ultimate challenge for any party of adventurers, though it would easily dispose of all but the most insanely overleveled groups."
Dragon-Kin, Albino Wyrm	Dragon no. 227 (1996)		
Dream Stalker	Requiem: The Grim Harvest (1996), Denizens of Darkness (2002), Denizens of Dread (2004)		
Fish, Deep Ocean	Dragon no. 235 (1996)	Angler Fish, Death Minnow, Gulper and Viperfish	
Fish, Tropical	Dragon no. 116 (1986)	Giant Grouper, Morena, Porcupine Fish and Electric Ray	
Fogwarden	Dungeon no. 54 (1995), Tome of Horrors (2002)		
Fraal	Alternity Player's Handbook (1998), Alien Compendium: Creatures of the Verge (1998), d20 Future (2004)		
Giant – Fhoimorien	Warlock of the Stonecrowns (1995)		
Gibberling, Brood (Far Realm)	The Gates of Firestorm Peak (1996)		
Golem, Brass Minotaur	Dragon no. 209 (1994), Monster Manual II (2002), D&D Miniatures: Night Below #2 (2007)		
Golem, Gemstone	Spellbound (1995), Monsters of Faerûn (2001)	Ruby, Emerald and Diamond	
Golem, Maggot	Requiem: The Grim Harvest (1996), Dragon #339 (2006)		
Groundling	Polyhedron no. 93 (1994), Monsters of Faerûn (2001)		
Hound of Law	The Rod of Seven Parts (1996)		
Human, Amazon	Dragon no. 43 (1980), Polyhedron no. 22 (1985)	Demihuman Amazons	NPC variant.
Human, Pygmy	Dungeon no. 56 (1995)		NPC variant.
Kercpa	Dragon no. 214 (1995)		
Lycanthrope, Lythari	Elves of Evermeet (1994), Monsters of Faerûn (2001)		
Mercurial	Doors to the Unknown (1996)		
Mold, Chromatic	Dragon Annual no. 1 (1996)	Chromatic and Sonic Mold	In the artificial dungeon environment of the game, molds function as a "clean up crew"; Chrulew considered molds typical flora within the game's "dungeon ecology".
Mummy, Bog	Requiem: The Grim Harvest (1996), Dragon #238 (1997), Dragon #300 (2002), Dragon Compendium, Volume 1 (2005)		
Nymph, Unseelie	None		
Octopus, Octo-jelly	Dragon no. 235 (1996)	Octo-jelly and Octo-Hide	
Sea Demon	Dragon no. 48 (1981)	Lesser and Greater	
Shadowrath	City of Splendors (1994)	Lesser and Greater	
Siren, Ravenloft	Requiem: The Grim Harvest (1996)		A decomposed species of mermaid, reviewer Philippe Tessier counted the Ravenloft siren among those critters which never stopped moving him.
Skeleton, Variant	Dragon no. 234 (1996)	Dust, Spike and Obsidian Skeletons	
Snake – Mahogany Constrictor	The Sword of Roele (1996)		
Spectral Scion	The Rjurik Highlands (1996)		
Spyder-Fiend	The Rod of Seven Parts (1996)	Kakkuu, Spithriku, Phisarazu, Lycosidilith and Raklupis	
Starfish, Giant – Giant Sunstar	Ship of Horror (1991)		
Tanar'ri, Lesser – Uridezu (Rat-Fiend)	Marco Volo: Departure (1994), Manual of the Planes (2001)		
Troll Mutate (Far Realm)	The Gates of Firestorm Peak (1996)	Troll Mutate and Matriarch Mutate	
Vaati (Wind Duke)	Dragon no. 224 (1995), The Rod of Seven Parts (1996)		
Vampire, Cerebral	Bleak House: The Death of Rudolph van Richten (1996), Denizens of Darkness (2002)		
Varkha	Dragon Annual no. 1 (1996)		
Worm, Lukhorn	Dragon Annual no. 1 (1996)		
Wyste (Far Realm)	The Gates of Firestorm Peak (1996), Speaker in Dreams (2001), Monster Manual II (2002)		
Yugoloth, Lesser – Gacholoth	Dungeon no. 49 (1994)		
Zombie, Mud	Death Ascendant (1996), Denizens of Dread (2004)		

== TSR 2433 – Dark Sun Monstrous Compendium Appendix II: Terrors Beyond Tyr (1995) ==
This 128-page soft-bound book is the second appendix to the Monstrous Compendium series designed for use with the Dark Sun campaign setting for the second edition of the Advanced Dungeons & Dragons game. It contains a page with a table of content, a 2-pages "How To Use This Book" section and 3 pages of random encounter charts, with the remainder consisting of the descriptions of the fictional monsters. Some entries also contain the descriptions of individual members of these monster types.

TSR 2433 – Dark Sun Monstrous Compendium Appendix II: Terrors Beyond Tyr (1995) – ISBN 0-7869-0097-0
Creature	Other appearances	Variants	Description
Aarakocra, Athasian			
Animal, Domestic		Aprig, Carru, Mulworm and Sygra	
Aviarag			
Baazrag			
Baazrag, Boneclaw			
Bloodgrass			
Cactus, Hunting			
Cactus, Rock			
Cilops			
Crodlu	Dune Trader (1992)	Cordlu and Heavy Crodlu	
Dagorran			
Dhaot			
Drake (Lesser), General			
-- Drake, Magma			
-- Drake, Rain			
-- Drake, Silt			
-- Drake, Sun			
Dray	City by the Silt Sea (1994)	Dray, Kalin Riders and Kalin Mount	Race of tall, lean, draconic humanoids created from humans by Dregoth, the Undead Dragon King; kalin riders: elite templar troops of Dregoth; kalin mount: 12-foot-long (3.7 m) aggressive insectoid creatures used as mounts by kalin riders
Drik		Drik and High Drik	
Dune Reaper		Drone, Warrior and Matron	
Dwarf, Athasian			After early plans to exclude traditional fantasy races like the dwarves from Dark Sun, they were included "with dramatic aesthetic facelifts to properly mesh them with the setting's uniquely tenebrous tone."
Elemental Beast, General			
-- Elemental Beast, Air			
-- Elemental Beast, Earth			
-- Elemental Beast, Fire			
-- Elemental Beast, Water			
Elf		Elf and Half-Elf of Athas	In the post-apocalyptic setting of Athas, elves are nomadic desert runners rather than the more common image of forest-dwellers.
Fael			
Feylaar			
Fordorran			
Giant, Shadow			
Golem, General			
-- Golem, Magma			
-- Golem, Salt			
Gorak		Gorak and Giant Gorak	
Half-giant	Monstrous Compendum Annual vol. 2 (1995)		
Halfling			As Dark Sun draws upon pulp fiction in the sword and sorcery genre, Wargamer writer Timothy Linward saw the jungle-dwelling, "savage, humanoid-eating" halflings in the setting as inspired by the trope of "man-eating pygmies, originating in Victorian hysteria around 'savage' indigenous cultures in the regions of the globe Europe was colonising."
Human		Ex-slaves, Herdsmen, Dune Traders, Ex-gladiators, Nobles and Templars	
Jhakar			
Kaisharga			
Kes'trekel			
Klar			
Krag	City by the Silt Sea (1994)		Undead with special powers related to the element or paraelement that killed it
Kragling	City by the Silt Sea (1994)		Skeletal Undead created and controlled by a krag and associated with that krag's element
Lirr		Lirr and Mountain Lirr	
Mastyrial		Desert and Black Mastyrial	
Meorty			
Mul			Human-dwarf descended sterile warriors, most of them appear as slaves in the setting. As Dark Sun in the view of Wargamer writer Linward "draws so much of its strength from moral horrors and challenging ideas", the setting "indelicately" assigns attributes to Muls to "make them 'naturally suited' to a live af labour", while the name closely resembling "mule" echos derogatory "slang used for people of mixed heritage."
Nikal			
Pakubrazi			
Paraelemental Beast, General			
-- Paraelemental Beast, Magma			
-- Paraelemental Beast, Rain			
-- Paraelemental Beast, Silt			
-- Paraelemental Beast, Sun			
Psionocus			
Psurlon	Planescape Monstrous Compendium Appendix III (1994)	Psurlon, Psurlon Adept and Giant Psurlon	
Raaig			
Racked Spirit			
Retriever, Obsidian			
Ruktoi			
Ruvkova	Planescape Monstrous Compendium Appendix III (1994)	Brajeti, Ethilum, Kaltori, Zathosi	
Sand Howler			
Scorpion		Barbed and Gold Scorpion	
Seed, Brain			
Silt Horror, Black			
Silt Horror, Magma			
Silt Horror, Red			
Silt Spawn	City by the Silt Sea (1994)		The young of a Silt Horror, this tentacled creature lives in groups in the shallows of the Sea of Silt
Slig			
Spider		Dark, Mountain and Silt Spider	
Spinewyrm			
Ssurran			
Stalking Horror			
Tarek		Tarek and Tarek Shaman	
Tari		Tari, Tari Warrior and Tari Chieftain	
Thri-kreen	Monster Cards Set 2 (1982), Monster Manual II (1983), Monstrous Compendium Forgotten Realms Appendix (1989), Monstrous Manual (1993), Dark Sun Monstrous Compendium Appendix II: Terrors Beyond Tyr (1995), Monster Manual II (2002), Monster Manual 3 (2010), Monster Manual (2014), Spelljammer: Adventures in Space (2022)		"Praying mantis man" with four arms and a poisonous bite
Tohr-kreen		J'ez, J'hol, T'keech and Tondi Tohr-kreen	
Trin	Thri-Kreen of Athas (1995)		9-foot-long (2.7 m) moderately intelligent insectoid creatures with four legs and two clawed arms, primitive relatives to thri-kreen
Tul'k			
T'liz			
Undead			
Wraith, Athasian			
Xerichon			
Zombie, Thinking			

== TSR 2613 – Planescape Monstrous Compendium Appendix II (1995) ==
This was the second appendix to the Monstrous Compendium series designed for use with the Planescape campaign setting for the second edition of the Advanced Dungeons & Dragons game. The 128-page soft-bound book contains a two-page "How to use this book" section, two pages of encounter tables for the different planes of the game and a one-page alphabetical for all monsters entries published for the setting, with the remainder consisting of the descriptions of the fictional monsters.

TSR 2613 – Planescape Monstrous Compendium Appendix II (1995) – ISBN 0-7869-0173-X
Creature	Other appearances	Variants	Description
Aasimar			Humanoids "descended from ethereal beings" from the Outer Planes, "charming creatures protecting the universe against evil". A.V. Club reviewer Nick Wanserski found them an interesting player character race "for the chance to be unequivocally good in a way that's difficult to embody in real life". Gus Wezerek, for FiveThirtyEight, reported that of the 5th Edition "class and race combinations per 100,000 characters that players created on D&D Beyond from" August 15 to September 15, 2017, aasimar were the thirteenth most created at 1,767 total. The three most popular class combinations with the aasimar were Paladin (429), Cleric (274), and Warlock (210). Wezerek noted "some of the common character choices can be explained by the game's structure of racial bonuses".
Abrian			
Arcane	Spelljammer: AD&D Adventures In Space (1989), Monstrous Manual (1993)		
Astral dreadnought	Manual of the Planes (1987), Manual of the Planes (2001), Manual of the Planes (2008), Mordenkainen's Tome of Foes (2018)		Gargantuan creature with a single black eye, gaping maw, muscular forearms, which end in pincer-like claws and serpentine lower body. Arcane considered these monsters to "populate their periphery with true terror". Originally called ethereal dreadnought.
Balaena	Monstrous Compendium – Outer Planes Appendix (1991)		
Bloodthorn			
Bonespear			
Darkweaver			
Demarax			
Dhour			
Eater of Knowledge			
Eladrin			Celestials from the Outer Planes, "charming creatures protecting the universe against evil".
Eladrin, Bralani (Lesser)			
Eladring, Coure (Lesser)			
Eladrin, Firre (Greater)			
Eladrin, Ghaele (Greater)			
Eladrin, Noviere (Lesser)			
Eladrin, Shiere (Lesser)			
Eladrin, Tulani (Greater)			
Fhorge			
Ghostlight			
Guardinal			Powerful neutral good celestials from Elysium, each a humanoid with some animalistic characteristics. Arcane magazine cites the culture of the guardinals as helping "give the Planes a solid base of peoples".
Guardinal, Avoral	Blood Wars Card Game (1995), Warriors of Heaven (1999), Monster Manual (2000), Savage Species (2003), Monster Manual (2003), Planar Handbook (2004)		
Guardinal, Cervidal	Blood Wars Card Game (1995), Warriors of Heaven (1999), Monster Manual II (2002)		
Guardinal, Equinal	Blood Wars Card Game (1995), Warriors of Heaven (1999), Book of Exalted Deeds (2003)		
Guardinal, Leonal	Blood Wars Card Game (1995), Warriors of Heaven (1999), Manual of the Planes (2001), Monster Manual (2003)		
Guardinal, Lupinal	Blood Wars Card Game (1995), Warriors of Heaven (1999), Monster Manual II (2002)		
Guardinal, Ursinal	Blood Wars Card Game (1995), Warriors of Heaven (1999), Book of Exalted Deeds (2003)		
Hollyphant			In a review of Planescape Monstrous Compendium Appendix II for Arcane magazine, the reviewer described hollyphants as "mutant killer elephants with wings" and felt that they were introduced to "ensure that the planes maintain their very necessary bizarre flavour". (1994)
Incantifer (Sect)			
Ironmaw			
Keeper			
Khaasta		Normal, Chieftain and Wise One	
Leomarh			
Merkhant (Sect)			
Monster of Legend			
Mortai	Monstrous Compendium – Outer Planes Appendix (1991)		
Noctral	Monstrous Compendium – Outer Planes Appendix (1991)		
Observer			
Prolonger			
Quill			
Rager (Sect)			
Razorvine			
Reave			
Retriever	Monstrous Compendium – Fiend Folio Appendix (1992)		
Rilmani			
Rilmani, Abiorach			
Rilmani, Argenach			
Rilmani, Aurumach			
Rilmani, Cuprilach			
Rilmani, Ferrumach			
Rilmani, Plumach			
Shadowdrake			
Sympathetic			
Spellhaunt			
Spider, Hook			
Sunfly			
Sword Spirit			
T'uen-Rin	Monstrous Compendium – Outer Planes Appendix (1991)		
Tanar'ri, Alkilith (True)			
Tanar'ri, Bulezau (Lesser)			
Tanar'ri, Maurezhi (Lesser)			
Tanar'ri, Yochlol (Lesser)	The Drow of the Underdark (1991) (as Yochlol)		
Terlen			
Tso			
Vaporighu	Monstrous Compendium – Outer Planes Appendix (1991)		
Vorr		Normal and Shaman	
Wastrel			
Wraithworm			
Yugoloth, Canoloth			Fiend distinguished by its sticky barbed tongue.

== TSR 2162 – Ravenloft Monstrous Compendium Appendices I and II (1996) ==
This 128-page soft-bound book is a reprint of the loose-leaf Monstrous Compendium appendices MC10 and MC15 (Children of the Night), both designed for use with the Ravenloft campaign setting for the second edition of Advanced Dungeons & Dragons game with a new foreword. It also includes a two-page "How to use this book" section, revised rules for calculating experience points and two pages about encounters in Ravenloft. Appendix I consists of the descriptions of the fictional monsters. Appendix II varies the Monstrous Compendium format to describe individuals of already published monster races and includes a two-page introduction with a list of monsters from other sources suitable for the Ravenloft setting.

== TSR 2524 – Savage Coast Monstrous Compendium Appendix (1996) ==
This monstrous compendium was released as a fully online product as part of the revised Savage Coast campaign setting for the second edition of the Advanced Dungeons & Dragons game. It was made freely available by Wizards of the Coast on the Web in two variants, as an RTF file and as a text file, with images presented as separate files. Several characters are misrepresented in these files, they are presented here as given. The monstrous compendium contains a table of contents, an introduction with explanations of the monster statistics and special rules and considerations for the Savage Coast setting.

TSR 2524 – Savage Coast Monstrous Compendium Appendix (1996)
Creature	Other appearances	Variants	Description
Aranea	Monstrous Compendium Annual vol. 3 (1996)		Not to be confused with similar creature defined in Monstrous Compendium – Mystara Appendix (1994), D&D Expert Module X1 Isle of Dread, D&D Expert Module X2 Castle Amber
Arashaeem			
Batracine			
Caniquine			
Cat, Marine			
Cinnavixen			
Critter, Temple			
Cursed One			
Deathmare			
Dragon, Crimson			
Dragon, Red Hawk			
Echyan	Monstrous Compendium Annual vol. 4 (1998) (as Sea Worm (Echyan))		
Ee'aar			
Enduk			
Fachan			
Feliquine			
Fiend, Narvaezan			
Frelôn			
Ghriest			
Glutton, Sea	Monstrous Compendium Annual vol. 4 (1998) (as Sea Serpent (Sea Glutton))		
Goatman			
Golem		Aelder (lesser), Glassine Horror (lesser), Red (greater) and Hulean Juggernaut (greater)	
Grudgling			
Heraldic Servant		Aurochs, Bear, Bee, Dolphin, Dragon, Eagle, Griffon, Horse, Lion, Phoenix, Ram, Rooster, Sea Horse, Sea Lion, Stag, Black Swan, Talbot, Tyger, Unicorn and Wyvern	
Hermit, Sea	Monstrous Compendium Annual Volume Four		A giant hermit crab that has mage spells, reviewer Philippe Tessier counted this monster among those critters which never stopped moving him.
Jorri			
Juhrion			
Kla'a-Tah		Kla'a-tah and clŠu-rin	
Leech, Legacy			
Lich, Inheritor			
Lizard Kin		Cayma, Gurrash, Krolli and Shazak	
Lupasus			
Lupin	Monstrous Compendium – Mystara Appendix (1994), D&D Expert Module X2 Castle Amber		
Lyra Bird, Sarag—n			
Malfera			
Manscorpion, Nimmurian			
Mythu'nn Folk			
Na‰ruk	Monstrous Compendium – Fiend Folio Appendix (1992) (Stwinger), Monstrous Compendium Annual vol. 1 (1994) (as Faerie, Petty)	Squeaker and Stwinger	As a fairy creature considered among the "standard repertoire of 'Monsters'" by Fabian Perlini-Pfister.
Neshezu			
Nikt'oo			
Nosferatu			
Omm-wa			
Omshirim			
Parasite		Inheritor Lice, Powder Moth, Jibarœ Pest, Lupin Plague, Cardinal Tick and Vermilia	
Phanaton, Jibarœ			
Plant	Monstrous Compendium – Mystara Appendix (1994) (Amber Lotus), D&D Expert Module X2 Castle Amber (Amber Lotus)	Amber Lotus, Eyeweed, Vermeil Fungus, Scarlet Pimpernel and Gargo—an Rose	
Pudding, Vermilion			
Rakasta	Monstrous Compendium – Mystara Appendix (1994), D&D Expert Module X1 Isle of Dread, D&D Expert Module X2 Castle Amber		
Ray, Forest			
Shedu, Greater	Monstrous Manual (1993)		Lawful good winged equine with human-like head. Based on a creature from Mesopotamian mythology.
Shimmerfish			
Skinwing			
Spawn of Nimmur		Spawn of Nimmur and Ziggurat Horror	
Spider-spy			
Spirit, Heroic			
Spirit, Wallaran		Kangaroo, Koala and Kookaburra	
Succulus			
Swampmare			
Swordsman, Clockwork	Dungeon no. 62 (1996), Monstrous Compendium Annual vol. 4 (1998)	Clockwork Swordsman and Rogue Automaton	
Symbiont, Shadow			
Tortle	Monstrous Compendium – Mystara Appendix (1994)	Tortle and Snapper	A "turtle-like race" of humanoids which were also available as player characters.
Troll, Legacy			
Trosip			
Tyminid			
Utukku			
Voat			
Voat, Herathian			
Vulturehound			
Wallara			
Wurmling			
Wynzet			
Yeshom			
Zombie, Red			

== TSR 2635 – Planescape Monstrous Compendium Appendix III (1998) ==
The third appendix to the Monstrous Compendium series designed for use with the Planescape campaign setting for the second edition of Advanced Dungeons & Dragons focuses mainly on inhabitants of the inner planes in the game. The 128-page soft-bound book contains a two-page "How to use this book" section, ten pages about the fictional principles governing those planes and their ecology, a 3-page appendix about animal-like creatures there, a 3-page index with all second edition monsters suitable for the Planescape setting, with the remainder consisting of the descriptions of the fictional monsters.

TSR 2635 – Planescape Monstrous Compendium Appendix III (1998) – ISBN 0-7869-0751-7
Creature	Other appearances	Variants	Description
Animental			
Archomental (evil)		Imix, Ogremoch, Olhydra, Yan-C-Bin and Cryonax	Bosses on their respective planes, Ed Greenwood considered the Elemental Princes of Evil "worthy additions to any campaign".
Archomental (good)		Ben-Hadar, Chan, Sunnis and Zaaman Rul	Bosses on their respective planes.
Belker			
Bzastra			
Chososion			
Darklight			
Devete			
Devourer			A giant skeleton that is holding a small figure prisoner in their ribcage, this creature is highlighted by reviewer Kaneda for characters to steer away from.
Dharum suhn			
Egarus			
Entrope			Monsters crazy enough to gradually destroy the borders between the different planes.
Facet			
Fire bat			
Frost salamander	Monstrous Compendium – Mystara Appendix (1994)		
Fundamental	D&D Expert Module X8 Drums on Fire Mountain, Creature Catalog (1993), Monstrous Compendium – Mystara Appendix (1994)		
Gamorm			Reviewer Kaneda called the gamorm a curiosity not to be disturbed under any circumstances, a "pretty little worm" [8' long] that lives in the Astral plane and feeds on the spirit of living beings it meets; a horror all the more dangerous because it can use the powers of the people it has devoured.
Homunculous, elemental		Breather and Skin	Adapted from the concept of the articifically created "little man" appearing in alchemical writings.
Immoth			
Khargra	Monstrous Compendium – Fiend Folio Appendix (1992)		
Klyndes			
Magran			
Menglis			
Nathri			
Ooze sprite			
Opposition			
Paraelemental		Ice, Magma, Ooze and Smoke	
Phirblas			
Quill			
Primal			
Psurlon	Dark Sun Monstrous Compendium Appendix II: Terrors Beyond Tyr (1995)	Normal, Adept and Giant	
Quasielemental, negative		Ash, Dust, Salt and Vacuum	
Quasielemental, positive		Lightning, Mineral, Radiance and Steam	
Rast			
Ravid			
Ruvkova	Dark Sun Monstrous Compendium Appendix II: Terrors Beyond Tyr (1995)		
Salamander noble		Lesser and Noble	
Scile		Scile and Ravager of Colour	
Shad			
Shocker	Monstrous Compendium – Fiend Folio Appendix (1992)	Contended One and Sojourner	
Sislan			
Suisseen			
Terithran	Monstrous Compendium – Fiend Folio Appendix (1992)		
Thoqqua			
Trilloch			
Tsnng			
Ungulosin			
Vacuous			
Wavefire			
Xag-ya/xeg-yi			
Xill	Monstrous Compendium – Fiend Folio Appendix (1992)		

== TSR 3140 – Birthright – Blood Spawn: Creatures of Light and Shadow (2000) ==
This bestiary was planned for use with the Birthright campaign setting for the second edition of the Advanced Dungeons & Dragons game. The Birthright product line was suspended in 1998 before its completion, so Blood Spawn was later published as an 83-page PDF-file and made freely available on the web. The supplement focused mainly on monsters of the Shadow World, the fictional dark twin dimension of the setting's world. It contained a table of contents, a 10-page introduction with an explanation of the monster statistics and special rules for the Shadow World, descriptions of the fictional monsters which included tips for their use in a roleplaying campaign, two roleplaying adventures and a 4-page appendix listing monsters from other sources fitting into the Shadow World.

TSR 3140 – Birthright – Blood Spawn: Creatures of Light and Shadow (2000)
Creature	Other appearances	Variants	Description
Blood Hound			
Changeling		Farie, Adult human and Child human changeling	
Cwn Annwn			
The Dispossessed			
Faerie, Seelie		Seelie Faerie, Faerie Queen, Deceiver, Innocent, Helper, Protector and Trickster	Fairy creatures were considered among the "standard repertoire of 'Monsters'" by Fabian Perlini-Pfister.
Faerie, Unseelie		Dark Queen, Living Evil Faerie and Undead Faerie	Fairy creatures were considered among the "standard repertoire of 'Monsters'" by Fabian Perlini-Pfister.
Halfling, Shadow World		Domain Lord, Slave, and Freedom Fighter	
Minion of the Lost		Halfling Spawn, Masetian Spawn and Orog Spawn	
Seemer			
Seeming Walker			
Shade			
Shadow Steed			
Shadow Warrior			
The Sluagh			
Spectral Awnshegh			
Waff			
Wild Hunt			
Will O'Shadow			

== Other sources ==
This section lists fictional creatures for AD&D 2nd Edition from various sources not explicitly dedicated to presenting monsters. Primarily, these are the separate sourcebooks and expansions for the Forgotten Realms, Al-Qadim and other campaign settings produced by TSR.

=== Spelljammer ===
==== TSR1049 – Spelljammer: AD&D Adventures In Space (1989) ====
The Spelljammer: AD&D Adventures in Space Spelljammer campaign setting boxed set contained 11 new creatures in the standard Monstrous Compendium format, on pages 67–86 of the Lorebook of the Void.

ISBN 0-88038-762-9

Creature	Other appearances	Variants	Description
Arcane, The	Monstrous Manual (1993) (as Arcane), Planescape Monstrous Compendium Appendix II (1995) (as Arcane)		
Beholder	Monstrous Manual (1993) (Beholder and Hive Mother; Orbus by reference only)	Beholder, Orbus and Hive Mother	A large orb dominated by a central eye and a large toothy maw, with 10 smaller eyes on tops sprouting from the top of the orb; the large eye negates all magic and the smaller eyes cause a variety of magical effects. A "creature that looks at you and is destroying you by the power of its magical eyes". A terrible beast, but depicted as "a cuddly rosy ball with too many eyes".
Dracon			
Dragon, Radiant (Celestial)			
Elmarin			
Ephemeral		Ephemeral Host	
Giff	Monstrous Manual (1993)		"anthropomorphic hippo space mercenaries" "with a penchant for firearms"
Kindori (Space Whale)			
Krajen		Immature and Adult	
Neogi	Monstrous Manual (1993), Volo's Guide to Monsters (2016)	Neogi, Great Old Master and Reaver	Large red spider-like carnivorous humanoids with reptilian heads.
Scavver		Gray, Brown, Night and Void	

==== TSR9280 – Lost Ships (1990) ====
The Spelljammer game accessory Lost Ships, by Ed Greenwood, contained several new creatures on pages 84–96.

ISBN 0-88038-831-5

Creature	Other appearances	Variants	Description
Beholder, Undead "Death Tyrant"	Monstrous Manual (1993)		
Beholder Eater, Thagar ("Grimmgobbler")			
Flow Barnacle			
Lich, Arch	Monsters of Faerûn (2001)		
Men: Wonderseeker			
Neogi: Undead Old Master			
Sarphardin ("Watcher")			
Shadowsponge ("Air Stealer")			
Spaceworm			
Tinkerer ("Giant Bubble")			

==== TSR1065 – The Legend of Spelljammer (1991) ====
The Legend of Spelljammer boxed set added four new creatures on pages 60–64 of The Grand Tour sourcebook.

ISBN 1-56076-083-4

Creature	Other appearances	Variants	Description
Kasharin	Monstrous Manual (1993) (as Beholder – reference only)		
K'r'r'r			
Lich, Master			
Shivak		Common and Guardian	

==== TSR9409 – Krynnspace (1993) ====
The Spelljammer game accessory Krynnspace, by Jean Rabe, contained two new creatures.

ISBN 1-56076-560-7

Creature	Other appearances	Variants	Description
Giant, Bosk			Savage 19-foot-tall (5.8 m) giants native to the bogs of the fictional planet Chislev.
Giant, Swamp			16-foot-tall (4.9 m) giants living in hunter-gatherer villages in the swamps of Chislev.

=== Forgotten Realms ===
==== TSR1060 – Ruins of Undermountain (1991) ====
The Forgotten Realms Ruins of Undermountain boxed set included 8 unnumbered 5-hole-punched loose-leaf pages of creature descriptions in Monstrous Compendium format.

ISBN 1-56076-061-3

Creature	Other appearances	Variants	Description
Beholder (Elder Orb)	Monstrous Manual (1993), Black Spine (1994), I, Tyrant (1996), Lords of Madness (2005)		
Beholder-kin (Death Kiss)	Monstrous Manual (1993), Black Spine (1994), I, Tyrant (1996), Monsters of Faerûn (2001), Lords of Madness (2005), Dragon Compendium, Volume 1 (2005)		
Darktentacles	Monstrous Compendium Annual vol. 2 (1995), Monster Manual II (2002)		
Ibrandlin	Monstrous Compendium Annual vol. 3 (1996), Priest's Spell Compendium, Volume One (1999), Monsters of Faerûn (2001)		
Scaladar	Monstrous Compendium Annual vol. 2 (1995), City of Splendors: Waterdeep (2005)		
Sharn	Netheril: Empire of Magic (1996), Monstrous Compendium Annual vol. 3 (1996), Monsters of Faerûn (2001), Anauroch: The Empire of the Shade (2007), Forgotten Realms Campaign Guide (2008)		Also named blackclaws, fhaorn'quessir, shiftshades, simmershadows, or skulkingdeaths.
Slithermorph	None		
Snakes, Flying	Races of Faerûn (2003)	Flying Fang and Deathfang	
Steel Shadow	None		
Watchghost	Wizard's Spell Compendium, Volume One (1996), Monsters of Faerûn (2001)		

==== TSR1066 – Maztica Campaign Set (1991) ====
The Maztica Campaign Set boxed set contained 4 new creatures in the standard Monstrous Compendium format, on pages 59–62 of the Maztica Alive booklet.

ISBN 1-56076-084-2

Creature	Other appearances	Variants	Description
Chac			
Jagre			
Kamatlan	Fiend Folio (1981) (Kamadan)	Kamatlan and Kamadan	
Plumazotl		Lesser and Greater	

==== TSR9326 – The Drow of the Underdark (1991) ====
This 128-page softbound book provided additional details on the history, culture and society of the dark elves, and included 9 additional creature descriptions in Monstrous Compendium format on pages 113–127.

ISBN 1-56076-132-6

Creature	Other appearances	Variants	Description
Bat, Deep	Dragon no. 90 (1984), D&D Master Rules (1985) (Werebat), Monstrous Compendium Ravenloft Appendix (1991) (Werebat), Dungeons & Dragons Rules Cyclopedia (1991) (Werebat), Monstrous Compendium Forgotten Realms Appendix (1991), 1991 Trading Cards Set no. 383 (Werebat), Night Howlers (1992) (Werebat), Monstrous Manual (1993), Ravenloft Monstrous Compendium Appendices I & II (1996) (Werebat), Monsters of Faerûn (2001) (Night Hunter, Sinister)	Azmyth, Night Hunter, Sinister and Werebat	
Dragon, Deep	Monstrous Compendium Forgotten Realms Appendix (1991), Monstrous Manual (1993), Monsters of Faerûn (2001), D&D Miniatures: Underdark set #52 (2005), Drow of the Underdark (2007), Draconomicon (2008) (as "Purple Dragon")		
Myrlochar	Monsters of Faerûn (2001)		
Pedipalp	Queen of the Demonweb Pits (1980), Monster Manual II (1983), Tome of Horrors (2002)	Large (Schizomida), Huge (Amblypygus) and Giant (Uropygi)	
Rothé, Deep	Fiend Folio (1981), Monstrous Manual (1993), Forgotten Realms Campaign Setting (2001)		
Solifugid	Queen of the Demonweb Pits (1980), Monster Manual II (1983), Tome of Horrors (2002)	Large, Huge and Giant	
Spider, Subterranean	Ruins of Undermountain (1991) (Hunting as "Spider, Flying", Watch), Monstrous Manual (1993), City of Splendors (1994) (Watch), Monsters of Faerûn (2001) (Hairy, Sword), Faiths and Pantheons (2002) (Hairy), City of Splendors: Waterdeep (2005) (Watch)	Hairy, Hunting, Sword and Watch	
Spitting Crawler	Forgotten Realms Campaign Setting (2001)		
Yochlol	Queen of the Demonweb Pits (1980), Monster Manual II (1983), Planescape Monstrous Compendium Appendix II (1995), Villains' Lorebook (1998), Dungeon no. 84 (2001), Monsters of Faerûn (2001), Fiendish Codex I (2006), Demon Queen's Enclave (2008)		Also called handmaiden of Lolth

==== TSR9333 – Fires of Zatal (1991) ====
The Forgotten Realms adventure Fires of Zatal for the Maztica setting by Jeff Grubb and Tim Beach contained three new fictional creatures.

ISBN 1-56076-139-3

Creature	Other appearances	Variants	Description
Ahuizotl	Fiend Folio (2003)		Dangerous intelligent alligator-like water monster in Maztica. This appearance differs significantly from the descriptions in both 3rd edition Fiend Folio and Aztec mythology.
Tabaxi	Monstrous Manual (1993) (Jaguar Lord as Tabaxi Lord)	Jaguar Lord	Described as a "lithe feline" race and "cat person". In 2020, Comic Book Resources counted the tabaxi as # 4 on the list of "10 Powerful Monster Species That You Should Play As", stating that "a Tabaxi monk with Boots of Speed and a few other speed buffs can in theory cover anywhere between 320ft per round to 253,440ft per round. Your ability to do this and break the sound barrier in-game entirely depends on how much time and leniency the DM grants you though." Again referring to the 5th edition presentation, A.V. Club praised the tabaxi as an interesting player character choice, calling that they "view money as a mere tool to be used in finding the real treasure—a good story" a "great character trait, while Black Gate reviewer Howard Andrew Jones called them "perennially popular".
Dragon, Maztican (Tlalocoatl, Rain Dragon)			

==== TSR1083 – Menzoberranzan (1992) ====
The Forgotten Realms Menzoberranzan boxed set included 7 pages of creature descriptions in Monstrous Compendium format, bound into the first book of the set (The City) on pages 88–94.

ISBN 1-56076-460-0

Creature	Other appearances	Variants	Description
Alhoon (Illithilich)	Monstrous Compendium Annual vol. 3 (1996), The Illithiad (1998), Monsters of Faerûn (2001), Lords of Madness (2005), D&D Miniatures: Night Below #38 (2007)		Undead mind flayer. Even more powerful than other illithids because it has developed "powerful sorcery to augment their already fearsome psionic powers".
Cloaker Lord	Monsters of Faerûn (2001)		
Foulwing	Dragon no. 197 (1993), Monstrous Compendium Annual vol. 1 (1994), Lost Empires of Faerûn (2005)		
Lizard, Subterranean	Forgotten Realms Campaign Setting (2001), Dungeon no. 94 (2002)	Pack Lizard	
Riding Lizard	Forgotten Realms Campaign Setting (2001)		
Wingless Wonder	Dragon no. 40 (1980), Wizard's Spell Compendium, Volume Four (1998), Secrets of the Magister (2000)	True and Transformed	

==== TSR1084 – Ruins of Myth Drannor (1993) ====
The Forgotten Realms The Ruins of Myth Drannor boxed set included 8 unnumbered 5-hole-punched loose-leaf pages of creature descriptions in Monstrous Compendium format.

ISBN 1-56076-569-0

Creature	Other appearances	Variants	Description
Aratha (Killer Beetle)	Monstrous Manual (1993)		
Baelnorn	Monstrous Compendium Annual vol. 1 (1994), Cormanthyr: Empire of Elves (1998), Monsters of Faerûn (2001)		
Blazing Bones	Monstrous Compendium Annual vol. 1 (1994)		
Doomsphere (Ghost Beholder)	Monstrous Manual (1993) (referenced only), Black Spine (1994), I, Tyrant (1996), Monsters of Faerûn (2001)		
Electrum Dragon	Dragon no. 74 (1983), Monstrous Compendium Annual vol. 1 (1994)		
Fang Dragon (Draco Dentus Terribilus)	Dragon no. 134 (1988), Monstrous Compendium Annual vol. 1 (1994), Monsters of Faerûn (2001), Draconomicon (2003), D&D Miniatures: War of the Dragon Queen set #48 (2006), Draconomicon (2008) (as "Gray Dragon")		
Dread	Monstrous Compendium Annual vol. 1 (1994), Lost Empires of Faerûn (2005)	Vampiric Dread	
Feystag (Calygraunt)	Dragon no. 89 (1989) (as "Calygraunt"), Monstrous Compendium Annual vol. 1 (1994)		
Lythlyx	Dragon no. 43 (1980), Monstrous Compendium Annual vol. 1 (1994)		
Magebane	Dragon no. 140 (1988), Monstrous Compendium Annual vol. 1 (1994)		
Metalmaster (Sword Slug)	Dragon no. 139 (1988), Monstrous Compendium Annual vol. 1 (1994), Lost Empires of Faerûn (2005)		
Naga, Bone	Monstrous Compendium Annual vol. 1 (1994), Monster Manual II (2002), Serpent Kingdoms (2004), D&D Miniatures: Unhallowed set #34, Monster Manual (2008)		
Ormyrr	Monstrous Compendium Annual vol. 1 (1994), Monster Manual II (2002)		
Windghost	Monstrous Compendium Annual vol. 1 (1994), Monster Manual II (2002)		
Xantravar (Stinging Horror)	Dragon no. 140 (1988), Monstrous Compendium Annual vol. 1 (1994)		
Xaver	Dragon no. 94 (1985), Monstrous Compendium Annual vol. 1 (1994)		

==== TSR1085 – Forgotten Realms Campaign Setting (1993) ====
The Forgotten Realms Campaign Setting (2nd edition) boxed set included 8 unnumbered 5-hole-punched loose-leaf pages of creature descriptions in Monstrous Compendium format.

ISBN 1-56076-617-4

Creature	Other appearances	Variants	Description
Aballin	Monstrous Compendium Fiend Folio Appendix (1992), Monstrous Compendium Annual vol. 1 (1994), Monsters of Faerûn (2001)		
Baneguard	Shadowdale (1989), Ruins of Undermountain (1991), Monstrous Compendium Annual vol. 1 (1994), Monsters of Faerûn (2001), Lost Empires of Faerûn (2005)	Direguard	
Bonebat	Halls of the High King (1990), Monstrous Compendium Annual vol. 3 (1996), Monsters of Faerûn (2001)	Battlebat	
Deepspawn	Dwarves Deep (1990), Monstrous Manual (1993), Pool of Radiance: Attack on Myth Drannor (2000), Monsters of Faerûn (2001), Lost Empires of Faerûn (2005)		
Dracolich	Dragon no. 110 (1986), Waterdeep and the North (1987), Monstrous Compendium Volume Three: Forgotten Realms Appendix (1989), 1991 Trading Cards #251, Monstrous Manual (1993), 1993 Trading Cards #387, Cult of the Dragon (1998), Draconomicon (2003), Dragon no. 344 "The Ecology of the Dracolich" (2006), D&D Miniatures: War of the Dragon Queen set #31 (2006), Dragon: Monster Ecologies (2007), Monster Manual (2008)		
Gambado	Fiend Folio (1981), Monstrous Compendium Fiend Folio Appendix (1992), Monstrous Compendium Annual vol. 1 (1994), Tome of Horrors (2002)		
Gibbering Mouther	Lost Tamoachan (1979), Hidden Shrine of Tamoachan (1979), Monster Manual II (1983), Dragon no. 160 "The Ecology of the Gibbering Mouther" (1990), Assassin Mountain (1993), Monstrous Compendium Annual vol. 1 (1994), Monster Manual (2000, 2003), D&D Miniatures: Aberrations set #50 (2004), Lords of Madness (2005), Monster Manual (2008)		A creature with many eyes and mouths, and a certain "vagueness of form". Witwer et al. found Erol Otus' early depiction "perversely beautiful", the artist's surrealist style very suited for this bizarre monster.
Gibberling	Fiend Folio (1981), Monstrous Compendium Fiend Folio Appendix (1992), Monstrous Manual (1993), Dragon no. 265 (1999), Monsters of Faerûn (2001)		
Helmed Horror	Halls of the High King (1990), Monstrous Compendium Annual vol. 1 (1994), Priest's Spell Compendium, Volume Three (2000), Monsters of Faerûn (2001), Dragon no. 302 (2002), Lost Empires of Faerûn (2005), D&D Miniatures: Underdark set #37 (2005), Monster Manual (2008)		
Lock Lurker	Dragon no. 139 (1988), Haunted Halls of Evening Star (1992), Monstrous Compendium Annual vol. 1 (1994), Priest's Spell Compendium, Volume Three (2000)		
Naga, Dark	Dragon no. 89 (1984), Anauroch (1991), Monstrous Compendium Forgotten Realms Appendix (1991), Dragon no. 261 "The Ecology of the Dark Naga: Fool Me Twice" (1999), Monster Manual (2000, 2003), D&D Miniatures: Underdark set #33 (2005), Monster Manual (2008)		
Nishruu	Halls of the High King (1990), Monstrous Compendium Annual vol. 1 (1994), Monsters of Faerûn (2001), Lost Empires of Faerûn (2005)		
Quaggoth	Fiend Folio (1981), Monstrous Compendium Fiend Folio Appendix (1992), Monstrous Manual (1993), Dragon no. 265 (1999), Monsters of Faerûn (2001), D&D Miniatures: War Drums set #57 (2006), Drow of the Underdark (2007)		
Skum	Polyhedron no. 67 (1992), Monstrous Compendium Annual vol. 1 (1994), Monster Manual (2000, 2003)		
Tressym	Haunted Halls of Evening Star (1992), Monstrous Compendium Annual vol. 1 (1994), Forgotten Realms Campaign Setting (2001), Lost Empires of Faerûn (2005)		

==== TSR1109 – City of Splendors (1994) ====
The Forgotten Realms City of Splendors boxed set included unnumbered 5-hole-punched loose-leaf pages of creature descriptions in Monstrous Compendium format.

ISBN 1-56076-868-1

Creature	Other appearances	Variants	Description
Curst	The Dragon no. 30 (1979), Monstrous Compendium Annual vol. 2 (1995)		The curst had the distinction of being the first piece of publication with references to the immensely detailed Forgotten Realms setting.
Doppelganger, Greater	Monstrous Compendium Annual vol. 2 (1995)		
Duhlarkin			
Ghaunadan	Monstrous Compendium Annual vol. 2 (1995) (under Ooze, Slime, Jelly)		"D&D's large variety of monstrous oozes and slimes took their original inspiration from Irvin S. Yeathworth Jr's The Blob" film, and are characterized by some "vagueness of form", which may provide more mobility in situations of danger.
Gulguthydra	Monstrous Compendium Annual vol. 2 (1995)		
Hakeashar	Monstrous Compendium Annual vol. 2 (1995)		
Leucrotta, Greater	Monstrous Compendium Annual vol. 2 (1995)		Based on the leucrotta as it appears in Roman folklore.
Nyth	Monstrous Compendium Annual vol. 2 (1995)		
Palimpsest	Monstrous Compendium Annual vol. 2 (1995)		
Peltast	Monstrous Compendium Annual vol. 2 (1995)	Normal and Greater	
Raggamoffyn	Monstrous Compendium Annual vol. 2 (1995)	Tatterdemanimal, Common Raggamoffyn, Gutterspite and Shrapnyl	CJ Miozzi included the raggamoffyn on The Escapist's list of "The Dumbest Dungeons & Dragons Monsters Ever (And How To Use Them)".
Sewerm	Monstrous Compendium Annual vol. 4 (1998), Serpent Kingdoms (2004)		
Shadowrath	Monstrous Compendium Annual vol. 4 (1998)	Lesser and Greater	
Watchspider			
Wereshark	Monstrous Compendium Annual vol. 2 (1995)		Prior to 2E, weresharks were created by Dr. John Eric Holmes, based on a Hawaiian legend of the shark man.

==== TSR9563 – Powers and Pantheons (1997) ====
The Forgotten Realms campaign expansion Powers & Pantheons by Eric L. Boyd contained next to the description of many deities also new creatures.

ISBN 0-7869-0657-X

Creature	Other appearances	Variants	Description
Divine Minion	Planescape Campaign Setting (1994) (Minion of Set)		Magical servants of Mulhorandi deities with the ability to shapechange into specific animals.
Elder Eternal Evil		Dendar the Night Serpent, Kezef the Chaos Hound, Ityak-Ortheel, the Elf-Eater	Titanic mythological evil creatures from the Outer Planes related to Abeir-Toril's prehistory
Shade	Monster Manual II (1983), Dragon no. 126 "The Ecology of the Shade" (1987), Dragon no. 213 (1995), Monstrous Compendium Annual vol. 4 (1998), Forgotten Realms Campaign Setting (2001), Races of Faerûn (2003), Dragon no. 307 (2003), Forgotten Realms Campaign Guide (2008)		Humans or demihumans imbued with the essence of the Plane of Shadow. For reviewer Philippe Tessier a monster in the spirit of Fiend Folio.

=== Dragonlance ===
==== TSR9294 – Dragon's Rest (1990) ====
The Dragonlance adventure Dragon's Rest by Rick Swan contained three new fictional creatures.

ISBN 0-88038-869-2

Creature	Other appearances	Variants	Description
Chronolily	Monstrous Compendium Annual vol. 2 (1995)		Immense sentient flower whose nectar reveals images of the past, present and future.
Chulcrix			Gigantic carnivorous worm with two pincers dwelling on the Ethereal plane.
Gk'lok-Lok			Tribal creatures consisting of stalk-like tendrils that spend their lives dormant, re-experiencing the lives of dead warriors.

==== TSR9334 – Wild Elves (1991) ====
The Dragonlance adventure Wild Elves by Scott Bennie contained six new fictional creatures.

ISBN 1-56076-140-7

Creature	Other appearances	Variants	Description
Curotai			Kagonesti transformed into six-armed ferocious evil fighter.
Dragon, Spider			Dragon-like evil creature with spider-legs and eyes.
Handmaiden of Takhisis		Jiathuli	Powerful evil entity with many spell-casting abilities serving Takhisis.
Ice Vampire			Undead Kagonesti with the ability to manipulate cold and a hunger for the warmth of living creatures.
Spider Horse			Predatory hybrid between a spider and a horse.
Weapon, Living			Evil spirit animating a melee weapon.

==== TSR9344 – Taladas: The Minotaurs (1991) ====
The Dragonlance game accessory Taladas: The Minotaurs by Colin McComb contained several new creatures.

ISBN 1-56076-150-4

Creature	Other appearances	Variants	Description
Children of the Sea	Monstrous Compendium Annual vol. 4 (1998), Bestiary of Krynn (2004), Bestiary of Krynn, Revised (2007)	Child of the Sea and Accantus	Human-like aquatic race that reproduces with humans. Accanta are wild and aggressive versions of the children of the sea that possess additional powers.
Grain Nymph	Monstrous Compendium Annual vol. 4 (1998)		Cultivated relatives of the nymph associated with farmland
Yrasda		Aphelka, Thanic and Ushama	Irda-like race closely linked to the sea with the ability to shapechange into a specific sea creature

==== TSR9382 – Flint's Axe (1992) ====
The Dragonlance adventure Flint's Axe by Tim Beach contained a new creature.

ISBN 1-56076-422-8

Creature	Other appearances	Variants	Description
Tyin		Adult and larva	9-foot-tall (2.7 m) grotesque semi-intelligent humanoid predator that can spit acid.

=== Al-Qadim ===
==== TSR1077 – Land of Fate (1992) ====
The Al-Qadim Land of Fate boxed set contained 8 unnumbered 5-hole-punched loose-leaf pages in Monstrous Compendium format.

ISBN 1-56076-329-9

Creature	Other appearances	Variants	Description
Genie of Zakhara, Dao	Monstrous Compendium vol. 1 (1989), Monstrous Manual (1993)		
Genie of Zakhara, Djinni	Monstrous Compendium vol. 1 (1989), Monstrous Manual (1993)		Powerful humanoid air spirit. Based on notions from Middle Eastern culture.
Genie of Zakhara, Efreeti	Monstrous Compendium vol. 1 (1989), Monstrous Manual (1993)		
Genie of Zakhara, Janni	Monstrous Compendium vol. 2 (1989), Monstrous Manual (1993)		
Genie of Zakhara, Marid	Monstrous Compendium vol. 2 (1989), Monstrous Manual (1993)		
Giant, Island			
Giant, Ogre			
Roc, Zakharan		Common, Great and Two-Headed	An enormous bird, based on the mythological roc probably of Persian origin, known from Sindbad the Sailor stories.
Yak-Man (Yikaria)	Monstrous Compendium Annual vol. 2 (1995)		

==== TSR9366 – Golden Voyages (1992) ====
The Al-Qadim Golden Voyages boxed set, by David "Zeb" Cook, contained 4 unnumbered 5-hole-punched loose-leaf pages in Monstrous Compendium format, each with a full-page image of the creature described on the back.

ISBN 1-56076-331-0

Creature	Other appearances	Variants	Description
Coelenite		Coelenite Colony and Mass Colony	Polyp colony with a mass mind, forming vaguely humanoid bodies from coral pieces.
Ogrima			Large evil humanoid resulting from breeding of an ogre and ogre mage.
Sartani			Up to 20-foot-tall (6.1 m) humanoid with crab-like head, arms and pincers.

==== TSR1091 – City of Delights (1993) ====
The Al-Qadim City of Delights boxed set contained 8 unnumbered 5-hole-punched loose-leaf pages in Monstrous Compendium format.

ISBN 1-56076-589-5

Creature	Other appearances	Variants	Description
Afanc (Gawwar Samakat)	Monster Manual II (1983), Monstrous Compendium Annual vol. 1 (1994)	Afanc and Young Afanc	
Al-Jahar (Dazzle)	Monstrous Compendium Annual vol. 1 (1994)		
Cat, Winged	Monstrous Compendium Annual vol. 1 (1994)	Lesser and Greater Winged Cat	
Crypt Servant	Monstrous Compendium Annual vol. 1 (1994), Priest's Spell Compendium, Volume One (1999)		
Genie, Tasked, Administrator	Monstrous Compendium Annual vol. 1 (1994)		
Genie, Tasked, Harim Servant	Monstrous Compendium Annual vol. 1 (1994)		
Ogre, Zakharan			
Opinicus	Monster Manual II (1983), Monstrous Compendium Annual vol. 1 (1994)		
Parasite	Monster Manual (1977) (Ear Seeker), Fiend Folio (1981) (Goldbug), Monstrous Manual (1993) (Ear Seeker), Monstrous Compendium Annual vol. 1 (1994)	Bloodring, Ear Seeker, Goldbug, Wizard Lice and Vilirij	
Pasari-Niml	Monstrous Compendium Annual vol. 1 (1994)	Warrior, Noble and Calipha	
Singing Tree	Monstrous Compendium Annual vol. 1 (1994)		
Sirine	Monstrous Manual (1993)		Based on the mythological siren, the sirine is a type of fey.
Talking Bird	Monstrous Compendium Annual vol. 1 (1994)		
Tatalla	Monstrous Compendium Annual vol. 1 (1994)		
Vargouille	Planescape Monstrous Compendium Appendix (1994), Volo's Guide to Monsters (2016)		
Vermin, Elemental	Monstrous Compendium Annual vol. 1 (1994)	Air (Duster), Earth (Crawler), Fire (Flameling) and Water (Spitter) Elemental Vermin	

==== TSR9431 – Assassin Mountain (1993) ====
The Al-Qadim Assassin Mountain boxed set contained 4 unnumbered 5-hole-punched loose-leaf pages in Monstrous Compendium format. ISBN 1-56076-564-X

Creature	Other appearances	Variants	Description
Cobra, Giant	Monstrous Compendium Annual vol. 1 (1994) (as Snake, Giant Cobra)	Elder Giant Cobra	
Genie, Tasked, Deceiver	Monstrous Compendium Annual vol. 1 (1994)		
Genie, Tasked, Oathbinder	Monstrous Compendium Annual vol. 1 (1994)		
Gibbering mouther	Lost Tamoachan (1979), Hidden Shrine of Tamoachan (1979), Monster Manual II (1983), Dragon no. 160 "The Ecology of the Gibbering Mouther" (1990), Forgotten Realms Campaign Setting (1993), Monstrous Compendium Annual vol. 1 (1994), Monster Manual (2000, 2003), D&D Miniatures: Aberrations set #50 (2004), Lords of Madness (2005), Monster Manual (2008)		A creature with many eyes and mouths, and a certain "vagueness of form". Witwer et al. found Erol Otus' early depiction "perversely beautiful", the artist's surrealist style very suited for this bizarre monster.
Greyhound, Saluqi	Monstrous Compendium Annual vol. 1 (1994) (as Dog, Saluqi)	Jungle Hounds	
Marrashi	Monstrous Compendium Annual vol. 1 (1994)		
Sandman	White Dwarf no. 10 (1978), Fiend Folio (1981), Monstrous Compendium Annual vol. 1 (1994) (under Elemental), Tome of Horrors (2002)		The Fiend Folio's illustration of the sandman was used by Richard Garfield in the prototype of the Doppleganger card during the development of his Magic: The Gathering card game.
Wind Walker	Strategic Review No. 3 (1975), Monster Manual (1977), Monster Cards, Set 4 (1982), Monstrous Compendium Annual vol. 1 (1994) (under Elemental), Tome of Horrors (2002)		

==== TSR9433 – Secrets of the Lamp (1993) ====
The Al-Qadim Secrets of the Lamp boxed set contained 4 unnumbered 5-hole-punched loose-leaf pages in Monstrous Compendium format. ISBN 1-56076-647-6

Creature	Other appearances	Variants	Description
Elemental Kin, Earth, Crysmal	Monster Manual II (1983), Monstrous Compendium Annual Volume One (1994), Psionics Handbook (2001), Expanded Psionics Handbook (2004)		
Elemental Kin, Fire, Azer	Monster Manual II (1983), Practical Planetology (1991), Monstrous Compendium Annual Volume One (1994), Monster Manual (2000, 2003), Savage Species (2003), D&D Miniatures: Harbinger set #32 (2003) ("Azer Raider"), D&D Miniatures: War of the Dragon Queen set #19 (2006) ("Azer Fighter"), Monster Manual (2008), Draconomicon (2008) ("Azer Beastmaster")	Amaimon, Nobles	
Genie, Tasked, Messenger	Monstrous Compendium Annual Volume One (1994)		
Genie, Tasked, Miner	Monstrous Compendium Annual Volume One (1994)		
Grue, Chaggrin (Soil beast)	Monster Manual II (1983), Monstrous Compendium Annual Volume One (1994) (as Grue, Earth; Grue, Fire; Grue, Air; Grue, Water)		The grue originates in the Zork series of text adventure computer games, where it eats adventurers who spend too long in the dark. White Dwarf reviewer Megan C. Evans referred to the grues as "a collection of terrifying beasties from the Elemental Planes".
Grue, Harginn (Flame horror)	Monster Manual II (1983), Monstrous Compendium Annual Volume One (1994) (as Grue, Earth; Grue, Fire; Grue, Air; Grue, Water)		The grue originates in the Zork series of text adventure computer games, where it eats adventurers who spend too long in the dark. White Dwarf reviewer Megan C. Evans referred to the grues as "a collection of terrifying beasties from the Elemental Planes".
Grue, Ildriss (Wind terror)	Monster Manual II (1983), Monstrous Compendium Annual Volume One (1994) (as Grue, Earth; Grue, Fire; Grue, Air; Grue, Water)		The grue originates in the Zork series of text adventure computer games, where it eats adventurers who spend too long in the dark. White Dwarf reviewer Megan C. Evans referred to the grues as "a collection of terrifying beasties from the Elemental Planes".
Grue, Varrdig (Fluid brute)	Monster Manual II (1983), Monstrous Compendium Annual Volume One (1994) (as Grue, Earth; Grue, Fire; Grue, Air; Grue, Water)		The grue originates in the Zork series of text adventure computer games, where it eats adventurers who spend too long in the dark. White Dwarf reviewer Megan C. Evans referred to the grues as "a collection of terrifying beasties from the Elemental Planes".

==== TSR9440 – Ruined Kingdoms (1994) ====
The Al-Qadim Ruined Kingdoms boxed set, by Steven Kurtz, contained an 8-page booklet with non-player characters and monsters.

ISBN 1-56076-815-0

Creature	Other appearances	Variants	Description
Segarran		Lesser and Greater	Humanoid with the head and tail of a crocodile and the ability to assume human form; servants of the evil goddess Ragarra. Greater seggaran have additional magical powers and bat's wings.
Serpent	Monstrous Compendium Annual vol. 2 (1995)	Herald and Teak	Herald serpent: intelligent, good-aligned messengers of serpent lords. Teak serpent: a 30-ft long constrictor snake. Animal studies scholar Matthew Chrulew observed that in contrast to more harmless animals the game dedicated space to "serpents, and their monstrous kin" as creatures which "are, indeed, monstrous in the powerful, predatory sense" and among "the most Nietzschean of animals".

==== TSR9449 – Corsairs of the Great Sea (1994) ====
The Al-Qadim Corsairs of the Great Sea boxed set, by Nicky Rea, contained an 8-page booklet with monsters. ISBN 1-56076-867-3

Creature	Other appearances	Variants	Description
Addazahr (Backbiter)	Monstrous Compendium Annual vol. 2 (1995)		Thin, blood-drinking flying insect that can cause disease.
Amiq Rasol	Monstrous Compendium Annual vol. 2 (1995)		Energy-draining undead corsairs.
Firethorn (Sea Rose)	Monstrous Compendium Annual vol. 2 (1995) (under Plant, Dangerous)		Poisonous rose-like plant that emits heat a night.
Ghul-Kin	Monstrous Compendium Annual vol. 2 (1995)	Soultaker and Witherer	Evil undead jann with shapechanging powers.
Sea Wyrm	Monstrous Compendium Annual vol. 2 (1995) (under Dragon-kin)		Large, usually non-aggressive sea serpent with sleep gas as a breath weapon.
Vizier's Turban	Monstrous Compendium Annual vol. 2 (1995)		Symbiotic creature that looks like a turban and draws hit points while enhancing magical abilities of a spellcaster.

=== Planescape ===
==== TSR2600 – Planescape Campaign Setting (1994) ====
The Planescape Campaign Setting boxed set contained a 32-page Monstrous Supplement booklet.

ISBN 1-56076-834-7

Creature	Other appearances	Variants	Description
Aleax			
Astral Searcher			
Barghest			Inspired by the barghest appearing in the "folklore of northern England", with dog-like characteristics but without the ghostly aspect of its source.
Cranium Rat			Rats modified by mind flayers which show a "glowing brain". Ranked among the weakest monsters in the game by Scott Baird from Screen Rant. Only in higher numbers do they become more intelligent, psionic, and dangerous.
Dabus			These "floating goat-men" are common within the fictional city of Sigil.
Magman			
Minion of Set	Powers & Pantheons (1997) (Divine Minion)	Minion of Set and Shadow Priest	
Modron		Monodrone, Duodrone, Tridrone, Quadrone, Pentadrone, Decaton, Nonaton, Octon, Septon, Hexton, Quinton, Quarton, Tertian, Secundus, Primus and Rogue Unit	In his review of the Planescape Campaign Setting boxed set, Gene Alloway mentioned the modrons as an example of "the old, tired and previously foolish" which the set "breathes new life and meaning into". Reviewer Scott Haring found that the "once-silly Modrons" from 1st edition AD&D were "given a new background and purpose that makes a lot more sense" in 2nd edition Planescape. Philippe Tessier praised the modrons as charming little critters.
Nic'Epona			
Spirit of the Air			
Vortex			
Yugoloth, Lesser – Marraenoloth			

==== TSR2603 – Planes of Chaos (1994) ====
The Planescape Planes of Chaos boxed set contained a 32-page Monstrous Supplement booklet.

ISBN 1-56076-874-6

Creature	Other appearances	Variants	Description
Abyssal Lord		Graz'zt and Pazrael	Powerful and evil demonic rulers, each controlling a section of the Abyss. CBR reviewer Daniel Colohan counted the abyssal lords among "the most feared enemies to encounter in any campaign". Among them, as an exception to the rule, Graz'zt appears humanoid rather than monstrous, and was ranked by Colohan number six among the "Top 10 Demon Lords Your Party Will Fear".
Asrai			
Bacchae			
Chaos Beast			
Chaos Imp	Monstrous Compendium Annual vol. 3 (1996)		
Fensir		Male, female and young Fensir, Fensir Mage and Rakka	
Howler			
Lillend	Monstrous Compendium Annual vol. 3 (1996)		Humanoid with a serpentine body from the waist down, wings, and feathers in place of hair. Animal studies scholar Matthew Chrulew observed that in contrast to many legendary creatures, where a mixture of human and animalistic characteristics represents a descent into bestiality, lillends are described as artistic and thus "exemplify cherished aspects of human and other-than-human life."
Murska			
Oread		Oread and Snowhair	
Ratatosk			
Tanar'ri, Lesser – Armanite	Monstrous Compendium Annual vol. 3 (1996)		
Tanar'ri, Greater – Goristro	Monstrous Compendium Annual vol. 3 (1996)		
Varrangoin (Abyssal Bat)		Lesser (types I-IV) and Greater Varrangoin (types V-VI)	
Viper Tree		Viper Tree and Larval Viper Tree	

==== TSR2607 – Planes of Law (1995) ====
The Planescape Planes of Law boxed set contained a 32-page Monstrous Supplement booklet.

ISBN 0-7869-0093-8

Creature	Other appearances	Variants	Description
Achaierai	Monstrous Compendium – Fiend Folio Appendix (1992)		
Archon	Monstrous Compendium – Outer Planes Appendix (1991) (Lantern, Hound, Warden, Sword and Tome), Monster Manual (2000, 2003) (Lantern, Hound, Trumpet)	Lantern, Hound, Warden, Sword, Trumpet, Throne, Tome and Fallen	
Baatezu, Lesser – Kocrachon			
Bezekira (Hellcat)	Monstrous Compendium – Fiend Folio Appendix (1992)		
Bladeling	Monstrous Compendium Annual Volume Three (1996)		
Busen			
Formian	Monstrous Compendium Annual Volume Three (1996)	Worker, Warrior, Myrmarch and Queen	
Gear Spirit			
Kyton	Monstrous Compendium Annual Volume Three (1996)		
Moigno			
Parai			
Rust Dragon			
Zoveri	Monstrous Compendium – Outer Planes Appendix (1991)		

==== TSR2615 – Planes of Conflict (1995) ====
The Planescape Planes of Conflict boxed set contained a 32-page Monstrous Supplement booklet.

ISBN 0-7869-0309-0

Creature	Other appearances	Variants	Description
Aeserpent			
Asuras	Monstrous Compendium – Al-Qadim Appendix (1992)	Asuras and Rogue Asuras	
Buraq	Monstrous Compendium – Al-Qadim Appendix (1992)		
Delphon			
Diakk		Varath and Carcene	
Ethyk	Monstrous Compendium Annual Volume Three (1996)		
Gautiere			
Linqua			
Ni'iath			
Phiuhl			
Quesar			A race of celestials from the Outer Planes
Slasrath			
Vaath	Monstrous Compendium Annual Volume Three (1996)		
Warden Beast	Monstrous Compendium – Outer Planes Appendix (1991)		
Yugoloth, Greater – Baernaloth		Baernaloth and Demented	

=== Dark Sun ===
==== TSR2400 – Dark Sun Campaign Setting (1991) ====
The original Dark Sun Boxed Set for the Dark Sun campaign setting contains several pages of monster description in The Wanderer's Journal book, as well as in the A Little Knowledge adventure booklet.

ISBN 0-7869-0162-4

Creature	Other appearances	Variants	Description
Animal, Domestic		Erdlu, inix, kank and mekillot	Erdlu: large flightless scaled bird kept for meat and eggs; inix: 16-feet carnivorous lizard used for riding and transport; kank: 8-feet-long black insects kept as mounts and for honey; mekillot: 30-feet-long moundshaped foul-tempered lizards used as caravan beasts
Belgoi	Monstrous Compendium Annual Volume Three (1996)		Belgoi appear human, but with long claws, toothless mouths, and webbed feet. They have a taste for the flesh of intelligent races.
Braxat	Monstrous Compendium Annual Volume Three (1996), Spelljammer: Adventures in Space (2022)		It is difficult to tell whether the braxat are of mammalian or reptilian stock. Their backs are covered with shells and their heads have a lizard-like shape. But, they walk upright, can speak with a human-like voice, have opposable thumbs, and are warm-blooded.
Dragon of Tyr			There is only one dragon in the Tyr region.
Dune Freak (Anakore)			A race of dimwitted humanoids with bony, wedge-like heads, small ears, and beady eyes covered by clear membranes to prevent sand from scratching them.
Gaj			A psionic horror, though physically it appears as a reptilian beetle six feet long.
Giant, Athasian	Monstrous Compendium – Dark Sun Appendix: Terrors of the Desert (1992)	Beasthead, desert and plains giant	Beasthead: 20ft-tall hostile giants with an animal head; desert: 25ft-tall giants living on desert islands; plains: 25ft-tall giants raising herds on islands with scrub plains terrain
Gith	Monstrous Manual (1993)		A grotesque race that appear to be a mixture of elf and reptile. They were detailed as a player character race much later, together with their relatives, the githyanki and githzerai, in Mordenkainen's Tome of Foes (2018).
Jorzhal			About four feet tall, the jozhal is a small, two-legged reptile with a skinny tail, a long flexible neck, and a narrow snout.
Silk Wyrm			A snake with a hard, chitinous shell that measure over 50 feet in length.
Tembo	Monstrous Compendium Annual Volume Three (1996)		A despicable, furless, tawny-colored beast covered with loose folds of scaly hide.
Kluzd			Snake-like reptiles that inhabit mudflats, ten feet long and two to three feet in diameter. They can swallow a grown man whole.
Wezer		worker, soldier, brood queen	Enormous flying insects that make underground hives in the desert.

==== TSR2432 – City by the Silt Sea (1994) ====
The City by the Silt Sea campaign expansion box for the Dark Sun campaign setting by Shane Lacy Hensley contains a 32-page Monstrous Supplement.

ISBN 1-56076-882-7

Creature	Other appearances	Variants	Description
Absalom (Unique Morg)			High Priest of Dregoth, an undead, mummy-like dray
Caller in the Darkness			Supernatural storm of trapped spirits that inspires fear and draws in psionicists within its reach
Dragon Beetle	Monstrous Compendium Annual Volume Two (1995)		1-foot-long (0.30 m) horned beetle living in groups with a poison dangerous to drakes, dragons and dray
Dray	Dark Sun Monstrous Compendium Appendix II: Terrors Beyond Tyr (1995)		Race of tall, lean, draconic humanoids created from humans by Dregoth
Dregoth, the Undead Dragon King	Dark Sun Campaign Setting (1995)		Undead dragon of Tyr, a mighty human sorcerer-psionicist transformed into a dragon-like being
Dwarf, Cursed Dead			Intelligent undead dwarves capable of attacking by shooting their sinews at an opponent
Kalin	Dark Sun Monstrous Compendium Appendix II: Terrors Beyond Tyr (1995), Monstrous Compendium Annual Volume Two (1995)	Kalin and Kalin Rider	12-foot-long (3.7 m) aggressive insectoid creatures used as mounts by kalin riders. Kalin riders: Elite templar troops of Dregoth
Krag	Dark Sun Monstrous Compendium Appendix II: Terrors Beyond Tyr (1995)		Undead with special powers related to the element or paraelement that killed it
Kragling	Dark Sun Monstrous Compendium Appendix II: Terrors Beyond Tyr (1995)	Lesser and greater	Skeletal Undead created and controlled by a krag and associated with that krag's element
Pit Snatchers			Elemental-like creature made of smoking tar that tries to drag its victims into the tar pit it lives in
Sharg			40-foot water creature resembling a crossbreed between a giant shark and a squid
Silt Serpent		Normal and giant	Poisonous serpent with psionic sensory powers, inhabiting the shallows of the Silt Sea. Animal studies scholar Matthew Chrulew observed that in contrast to more harmless animals the game dedicated space to "serpents, and their monstrous kin" as creatures which "are, indeed, monstrous in the powerful, predatory sense" and among "the most Nietzschean of animals".
Silt Spawn	Dark Sun Monstrous Compendium Appendix II: Terrors Beyond Tyr (1995)		The young of a Silt Horror, this tentacled creature lives in groups in the shallows of the Sea of Silt
Venger			Undead relentlessly seeking to destroy someone who did it a great wrong
Wall-Walker	Monstrous Compendium Annual Volume Two (1995)		5-foot-long (1.5 m), scaled, spider-like subterranean creature using chameleon-like powers and paralytic poison to torment its victims

==== TSR2437 – Thri-Kreen of Athas (1995) ====
The Dark Sun campaign setting accessory Thri-Kreen of Athas by Tim Beach and Dori Hein contained three monster descriptions.

ISBN 0-7869-0125-X

Creature	Other appearances	Variants	Description
Trin	Dark Sun Monstrous Compendium Appendix II: Terrors Beyond Tyr (1995)		9-foot-long (2.7 m) moderately intelligent insectoid creatures with four legs and two clawed arms, primitive relatives to thri-kreen
Jalath'gak		Normal and giant	13-foot-long (4.0 m) predatory winged insect appearing in swarms
Zik-trin'ak			Thri-kreen warrior caste enhanced for combat from normal members of their species

==== TSR2438 – Dark Sun Campaign Setting (1995) ====
The expanded and revised campaign setting boxed set for Dark Sun contained several pages of monster description in The Wanderer's Chronicle booklet.

ISBN 0-7869-0162-4

Creature	Other appearances	Variants	Description
Animal, Domestic		Erdlu, inix, kank and mekillot	Erdlu: large flightless scaled bird kept for meat and eggs; inix: 16-feet carnivorous lizard used for riding and transport; kank: 8-feet-long black insects kept as mounts and for honey; mekillot: 30-feet-long moundshaped foul-tempered lizards used as caravan beasts
Dregoth, the Undead Dragon King	City by the Silt Sea (1994)		Undead dragon of Tyr, a mighty human sorcerer-psionicist transformed into a dragon-like being
Giant, Athasian	Monstrous Compendium – Dark Sun Appendix: Terrors of the Desert (1992)	Beasthead, desert and plains giant	Beasthead: 20ft-tall hostile giants with an animal head; desert: 25ft-tall giants living on desert islands; plains: 25ft-tall giants raising herds on islands with scrub plains terrain

==== TSR2444 – The Wanderer's Chronicle Lords of the Last Sea (1996) ====
The Wanderer's Chronicle:nd Lords of the Last Sea by Matt Forbeck contained ten pages of descriptions of NPCs and monsters.

ISBN 0-7869-0367-8

Creature	Other appearances	Variants	Description
Dolphin, Athasian	Monstrous Compendium Annual Volume Four		
Giant, Crag	Monstrous Compendium Annual Volume Four		
Kreel	Monstrous Compendium Annual Volume Four (as Fish, Athasian)		
Lizard Man, Athasian			
Puddingfish	Monstrous Compendium Annual Volume Four (as Fish, Athasian)		
Shark, Athasian	Monstrous Compendium Annual Volume Four (as Fish, Athasian)		
Skyfish	Monstrous Compendium Annual Volume Four (as Fish, Athasian)		
Squark			

=== Birthright ===
==== TSR3100 – Birthright Campaign Setting (1995) ====
Within the Birthright Campaign Setting box were a set of cardsheets, separate from the books. Beyond rules summaries and handy charts, several unique monsters were presented.

Creature	Other appearances	Variants	Description
Dragon, Cerilian	Monstrous Compendium Annual Volume Three (1996)		A dragon variant unique to this setting, with a breath weapon of a stream of burning venom.
Giant, Cerilian	Monstrous Compendium Annual Volume Three (1996)	Forest, Ice	
Goblin, Cerilian	Monstrous Compendium Annual Volume Three (1996)		
Orog			A subterranean race of miners and warriors that inhabit Cerilia's mountain ranges.
The Gorgon			One of the awnsheghlien ("Blood of Darkness" in Elven, champions of evil), he is the regent of The Gorgon's Crown in North Anuire. A terribly powerful antagonist of humankind.
Rhuobhe Manslayer			One of the awnsheghlien, an elf twisted by his hatred and pledge to exterminate all humanity.
The Seadrake			One of the awnsheghlien, a merchant who transformed into a massive sea serpent over centuries.
The Spider			One of the awnsheghlien, a goblin who became an arachnoid monster, and regent of The Spiderfell.

=== Greyhawk ===
==== TSR11374 – The Scarlet Brotherhood (1999) ====
The Greyhawk campaign setting accessory The Scarlet Brotherhood, by Sean Reynolds, contained the descriptions of seven monsters.

Creature	Other appearances	Variants	Description
Bredthrall (slave races)		Komazar, Kurg, Rullhow	
Gibbering Mouther, Greater		Gibberspawn	
Onco			
Ravenous			
Su-Monkey			
Thousandtooth			
Tolkasazotz (Olman Bat-Vampire)			

=== Core AD&D sources ===
==== TSR9506 – Chronomancer (1995) ====
The Chronomancer game accessory, by Loren Coleman, contained 7 pages of monsters living on Temporal Prime, a fictitious dimension that allows time travel.

ISBN 0-7869-0325-2

Creature	Other appearances	Variants	Description
Chronovoid	Monstrous Compendium Annual Volume Three (1996)		Communal organism that looks like an ovoid blob of gelatinous matter.
Temporal Dog	Monstrous Compendium Annual Volume Three (1996)		Intelligent dogs with the ability to slip between Temporal Prime and other planes.
Temporal Glider	Monstrous Compendium Annual Volume Three (1996)		Ray-like creature that glides freely on Temporal Prime.
Temporal Stalker	Monstrous Compendium Annual Volume Three (1996)		Undead trying to destroy creatures not native to Temporal Prime.
Tether Beast	Monstrous Compendium Annual Volume Three (1996)		Fierce, intelligent and evil predator that resembles a behir.
Time Dimensional	Monster Manual II (1983) (as time elemental), Monstrous Compendium Annual Volume Three (1996)	Common, Noble and Royal	Highly intelligent being composed of the essence of time and appearing as a sphere of silver light.
Vortex Spider	Monstrous Compendium Annual Volume Three (1996)		12-foot long spider spinning invisible webs of temporal energy.

==== TSR9539 – The Sea Devils (1997) ====
The Sea Devils game accessory by Skip Williams, detailing the sahuagin in the Monstrous Arcana series, contained two pages detailing new aquatic monsters.

ISBN 0-7869-0643-X

Creature	Other appearances	Variants	Description
Anguiliian	Stormwrack (2005)		Tyler Linn of Cracked.com identified the anguillian as one of the "15 Most Idiotic Monsters In Dungeons & Dragons History", commenting that "Judging by the spear and the Sarlacc mouth, things down there aren't quite as whimsical as Sebastian the crab would have us believe." He adds: "Buddy, you've got a mouth lined with thousands of razor-sharp teeth and huge terrifying crab claws for hands. You do not need to try to jab people with a sharpened stick."
Nawidnehr (sharkwere)			

==== TSR9569 – The Illithiad (1998) ====
The Illithiad game accessory by Bruce R. Cordell, in the Monstrous Arcana series, contained 7 pages of monsters linked to the illithids.

ISBN 0-7869-1206-5

Creature	Other appearances	Variants	Description
Elder brain			10-foot-diameter (3.0 m) brain with immense psionic abilities; the center of an illithid community. A version of a brain in a jar, it was ranked among the strongest monsters in the game by Scott Baird from Screen Rant.
Urophions	Lords of Madness (2005)		Cross between roper and illithid that looks like a rocky outcropping and has hidden tentacles.
Neothelid	Psionics Handbook (2001)		Worm-like creature 10 feet (3.0 m) in diameter and 100 feet (30 m) long with four long tentacles protruding from the lamprey-like maw.
Gohlbrorn	Dragon Annual no. 1 (1996), Monstrous Compendium Annual Volume Four (1998) (as Bulette, Gohlbrorn)		Subterranean predator; a smaller, more intelligent relative of the bulette.

=== Dragon ===
Dragon magazine introduced many new monsters to the Advanced Dungeons & Dragons game. It functioned as "a creative safe haven for a diverse stable of talents—creators, amateur and professional alike—to" among other things "envision exotic monsters".

Creature	Other appearances	Variants	Description
Duckbunny			The duckbunny is the result of a magical crossbreeding experiment. CJ Miozzi included the duckbunny on The Escapist's list of "The Dumbest Dungeons & Dragons Monsters Ever (And How To Use Them)". The duckbunny appeared in Dragon No. 243 (January 1998).

== See also ==
- Monsters in Dungeons & Dragons
- List of Dungeons & Dragons monsters (1974–76)
- List of Dungeons & Dragons monsters (1977–94)
- List of Dungeons & Dragons 3rd edition monsters
- List of Dungeons & Dragons 3.5 edition monsters
- List of Dungeons & Dragons 4th edition monsters
- List of Dungeons & Dragons 5th edition monsters
