= List of Dark Sun modules and sourcebooks =

The following is a list of Dark Sun modules and sourcebooks:

== 2nd Edition Advanced Dungeons & Dragons ==
- Rulebooks
  - Timothy Brown (October 1991). Dark Sun Boxed Set (1st boxset). TSR, Inc. ISBN 1-56076-104-0.
  - Timothy Brown (June 1992). Dark Sun: Dragon Kings. TSR, Inc. ISBN 1-56076-235-7.
  - Bill Slavicsek (October 1995). Dark Sun Campaign Setting, Expanded and Revised (2nd boxset). TSR, Inc. ISBN 0-7869-0162-4.
- Accessories
  - Walter Baas (March 1992). Terrors of the Desert (Dark Sun Monstrous Compendium I). TSR, Inc. ISBN 1-56076-272-1.
  - Bill Slavicsek (February 1992). DSR1: Slave Tribes. TSR, Inc. ISBN 1-56076-271-3.
  - Anthony Pryor (May 1992). DSR2: Dune Trader. TSR, Inc. ISBN 1-56076-545-3.
  - Allen Varney (October 1992). DSR3: Veiled Alliance. TSR, Inc. ISBN 1-56076-313-2.
  - Richard Baker (December 1992). DSR4: Valley of Dust and Fire. TSR, Inc. ISBN 1-56076-313-2.
  - Walter Baas (July 1993). Complete Gladiator's Handbook, The. TSR, Inc. ISBN 1-56076-616-6.
  - Walter Baas (August 1993). DSS1: City-State of Tyr. TSR, Inc. ISBN 1-56076-629-8.
  - Doug Stewart (October 1993). DSS2: Earth, Air, Fire and Water. TSR, Inc. ISBN 1-56076-652-2.
  - Bill Slavicsek (November 1993). DSS3: Elves of Athas. TSR, Inc. ISBN 1-56076-665-4.
  - Richard Baker (June 1994). The Will and the Way: Psionicists of Athas. TSR, Inc. ISBN 1-56076-861-4.
  - Anne Gray McCready (March 1995). Terrors Beyond Tyr (Dark Sun Monstrous Compendium II). TSR, Inc. ISBN 0-7869-0097-0.
  - Jon Pickens (April 1995). Thri-Kreen of Athas. TSR, Inc. ISBN 0-7869-0125-X.
  - Bill Slavicsek (June 1995). Beyond the Prism Pentad. TSR, Inc. ISBN 0-7869-0308-2.
  - Monte Cook (December 1995). Windriders of the Jagged Cliffs. TSR, Inc. ISBN 0-7869-0169-1.
  - Nicky Rea (July 1996). Defilers and Preservers: The Wizards of Athas. TSR, Inc. ISBN 0-7869-0383-X.
  - Kevin Melka (October 1996). Psionic Artifacts of Athas. TSR, Inc. ISBN 0-7869-0390-2.
- Adventures
  - David Cook (January 1992). DS1: Freedom. TSR, Inc. ISBN 1-56076-105-9.
  - David Cook (April 1992). DSQ1: Road to Urik. TSR, Inc. ISBN 1-56076-248-9.
  - Bill Slavicsek (August 1992). DSQ2: Arcane Shadows. TSR, Inc. ISBN 1-56076-312-4.
  - Anthony Pryor (November 1992). DSQ3: Asticlian Gambit. TSR, Inc. ISBN 1-56076-315-9.
  - Richard Baker (March 1993). DSE1: Dragon's Crown. TSR, Inc. ISBN 1-56076-567-4.
  - Sam Witt (April 1993). DSM1: Black Flames. TSR, Inc. ISBN 1-56076-580-1.
  - Richard Baker (September 1993). DSM2: Merchant House of Amketch. TSR, Inc. ISBN 1-56076-643-3.
  - William Connors (December 1993). DSM3: Marauders of Nibenay. TSR, Inc. ISBN 1-56076-677-8.
  - John Terra (1994). Forest Maker. TSR, Inc. ISBN 1-56076-841-X.
- Box Sets
  - TSR, Inc. (June 1993). Ivory Triangle, The. TSR, Inc. ISBN 1-56076-604-2.
  - Walter Baas (February 1994). DSE2: Black Spine (Dark Sun). TSR, Inc. ISBN 1-56076-824-X.
  - Shane Lacy Hensley (September 1994). City by the Silt Sea. TSR, Inc. ISBN 1-56076-882-7.
  - Matt Forbeck (February 1996). The Wanderers Chronicle: Mind Lords of the Last Sea. TSR, Inc. ISBN 0-7869-0367-8.

== 3rd Edition ==
=== Paizo's Dark Sun ===
- Noonan, David (January 2004). "Defilers of Athas." Dragon Magazine, p33.
- Noonan, David (May 2004). "The Dark Sun DM's Guide." Dungeon Magazine, p60.
- Noonan, David (May 2004). "Dark Sun Monster Supplement." Dungeon Magazine, p84.
- Noonan, David (May 2004). "Dark Sun Player's Handbook." Dragon Magazine, p16.
- Flipse, Chris; Sederquist, Jon (January 2006). "Dragon Kings." Dragon Magazine, p22.

=== Athas.org's Dark Sun ===
- Rule Books
  - Brax; Bruno Fernandes; Chris Flipse; Jon // Oracle (2003). Dark Sun 3: Rules For Dark Sun Campaigns. OGL.
  - Brax; Bruno Fernandes; Chris Flipse; Jon // Oracle (2008). Dark Sun 3: Rules For Dark Sun Campaigns. OGL.
- Accessories
  - Brax; Jon // Oracle (December 2007). Athasian Emporium(Beta). athas.org under OGL.
  - Brax; Jon // Oracle (November 2007). Faces of the Forgotten North. athas.org under OGL.
  - Brax; Jon // Oracle (September 2007). City State of Draj. athas.org under OGL.
  - Brax; Jon // Oracle (September 2007). Life Shaping Handbook. athas.org under OGL.
  - Brax; Jon // Oracle (September 2007). Prestige Class Appendix, Volume II. athas.org under OGL.
  - Brax; Jon // Oracle (September 2007). Legends of Athas. athas.org under OGL.
  - Brax; Jon // Oracle (September 2007). Dregoth Ascending. athas.org under OGL.
  - Brax; Jon // Oracle (September 2007). Prestige Class Appendix, Volume I. athas.org under OGL.
  - Brax; Jon // Oracle (September 2007). Terrors of Athas. athas.org under OGL.
  - Brax; Jon // Oracle (September 2007). Terrors of the Deadlands. athas.org under OGL.
  - Brax; Jon // Oracle (September 2007). Tyrian Conspiracy. athas.org under OGL.
  - Brax; Jon // Oracle (September 2007). Tyrian Conspiracy. athas.org under OGL.
  - Brax; Jon // Oracle (November 2007). Whispers of the Storm. athas.org under OGL.
  - Brax; Jon // Oracle (September 2007). Trade Lords. athas.org under OGL.
  - Brax; Jon // Oracle (September 2007). Villages of the Wastes. athas.org under OGL.
  - Brax; Jon // Oracle (September 2007). Wisdom of the Drylanders. athas.org under OGL.

== 4th Edition ==
- Rule Book
  - Richard Baker; Robert J. Schwalb; Rodney Thompson (August 2010). Dark Sun Campaign Setting: A 4th Edition D&D Supplement. Wizards of the Coast. ISBN 978-0-7869-5493-3.
- Accessories
  - Bruce R. Cordell (August 2010). Dark Sun Creature Catalog. Wizards of the Coast. ISBN 978-0-7869-5495-7.
  - Richard Baker, Bruce R. Cordell (August 2010). Marauders of the Dune Sea. Wizards of the Coast. ISBN 978-0-7869-5494-0.
  - Nicholas K. Tulach (2010). Fury of the Wastewalker. Wizards of the Coast.
- Adventures
  - Bloodsand Arena (Free RPG Day, June 2010)
  - Marauders of the Dune Sea (August 2010)
