= List of Dark Sun characters =

This is a list of fictional characters from the Dark Sun campaign setting for the Dungeons & Dragons fantasy role-playing game. Most of these characters have appeared in the multiple Dark Sun source books or novels. Many have some magical abilities.

== A ==
Agis of Asticles: a psionicist senator/nobleman from the city state of Tyr who plays a major role in the Prism Pentad novels by Troy Denning, the freeing of Tyr, and the pursuit of Tithian.

Andropinis: 8th Champion of Rajaat, "Slayer of Elves"; Male; Sorcerer-king of Balic; Cleansing unsuccessful. Formerly known as Albeorn of Dunswich, in the 2nd and 3rd editions, Andropinis was banished to the Black by Rajaat.

In 4th edition, Andropinis is still ruling his city-state of Balic.

Abalach-Re: 5th Champion of Rajaat, "Orc Plague"; Female; Sorcerer-queen of Raam; Exterminated the orc race in 889 years. Formerly Uyness of Waverly, In the 2nd edition, Abalach-Re was killed by Sadira of Tyr with the broken tip of the sword Scourge.

In 4th edition Abalach-Re is described as a vain and neglectful ruler more interested in her own pleasure than in the well being of the citizens of her city-state. She is otherwise unchanged and is still ruling her city-state at the start of the campaign setting.

Atzetuk : the "adopted" son of the former sorcerer-king of Draj, Tectuktitlay.

== B ==
Borys of Ebe: 13th Champion of Rajaat, "Butcher of Dwarves", Dragon of Tyr; Male; former Sorcerer-king of Ur Draxa (now deceased); Cleansing unsuccessful. In the 2nd edition Borys led the Champions in revolt against Rajaat and was later tasked with keeping him imprisoned for eternity. In return for this burden he was transformed into a dragon. The 3rd edition elaborates that Borys' transformation drove him temporarily insane for one hundred years. Upon returning to sanity he realized that Rajaat's prison was nearly at the point of disintegration. Borys demands yearly sacrifices of 1000 slaves from each of the region's city-states to power Rajaat's arcane prison in the Hollow. Borys uses the riches levied from the sacking of Yarmamuke to build his own city-state of Ur-Draxa. It was the greatest city in Athas at that time. He places Borys was eventually killed by Rikus using the Scourge, Borys' ancient sword that was crafted by Rajaat. Rikus accomplished this with assistance from Sadira, Neeva, and Rkard as part of the events of the Prism Pentad novels by Troy Denning. In The Rise and Fall of A Dragon King, there is a reference to Borys succeeding a previous "Butcher of Dwarves".

In 4th edition, Borys is mentioned as the leader of the rebellion against Rajaat but his fate is unknown.

== C ==
Caelum: a dwarven Sun Cleric (Paraelemental Sphere of Sun). Marries Neeva and fathers Rkard.

== D ==
Daskinor: 14th Champion of Rajaat, "Goblin Death"; Male; Sorcerer-king of Eldaarich; Exterminated the goblin race in 822 years. In the 2nd and 3rd editions Daskinor descended into insanity and paranoia, and now terrorizes the citizens of the isolated city-state of Eldaarich.

Daskinor is not mentioned in the 4th edition campaign setting and the city-state he ruled is referred to as semi-legendary.

Dregoth: 3rd Champion of Rajaat, "Ravager of Giants"; Male; Sorcerer-king of Guistenal; Cleansing unsuccessful. In the 2nd edition Dregoth was killed by several of his fellow sorcerer-kings, led by Abalach-Re, to prevent him from becoming a full dragon. Dregoth was raised from death with the aid of his high templar Mon Adderath, becoming something akin to a kaisharga. New Giustenal exists under the remnants of the old city, and Dregoth reigns there as sorcerer-king. Dregoth rebuilds his city and transforms the inhabitants into the dray (dragonborn).

In 4th edition, Dregoth is the progenitor of the dray (dragonborn), and is killed by his fellow sorcerer-kings who feared his growing power. He raises himself from the dead continuing to secretly rule from the desolated city-state of Giustenal.

== G ==
Gallard : see Nibenay.

== H ==
Hamanu: 4th Champion of Rajaat, "Troll Scorcher"; Male; Sorcerer-king of Urik; Exterminated the troll race in 1505 years. Formerly Manu of Dece, in the 2nd edition Hamanu kills and replaces Myron when he displeases Rajaat. Hamanu would later assist Borys in his rebellion against Rajaat and become the sorcerer-king of Urik. In the 3rd edition it is explained that Myron was replaced by one of his soldiers, Manu of Deche, for some unknown failing. There is no mention of Hamanu killing Myron.

In 4th edition, Hamanu is largely unchanged though there is no reference to Myron in this edition of the campaign setting. Urik's obsidian mines are listed as source of the conflict between Sielba and Hamanu. Hamanu destroyed Sielba and her city-state she refused to heed Hamanu's warning against prospecting on his land.

== I ==
Inenek : see Lalali-Puy

Irikos Human defiler and warlord, "The Left Hand of Rajaat";Male;. He was tasked with destroying the orcs during the Cleansing War and was given a powerful sword named Silencer. Rajaat also tasked him with the destruction of the city of Bodach. He was killed after succeeding in his mission but his sword was lost. Irikos is only mentioned in a few source books his destruction of the orcs may have been an error as it conflicts with the majority of the source material (see Abalach-Re).

== J ==
Jo’orsh : One of the two dwarves that stole the Dark Lens. Upon dying they became banshee guardians of the talisman.

== K ==
Kalak: 2nd Champion of Rajaat, "Ogre Doom"; Male; Sorcerer-king of Tyr; Exterminated the ogre race in 1228 years. In the 2nd and 3rd editions Kalak was attempting to complete the ten-stage metamorphosis ritual to become a dragon by constructing a ziggurat that would harness the life-energy of his city-state's citizens. He was assassinated by Rikus, Neeva, Sadira, Agis, and Tithian as part of the events of the Prism Pentad novels by Troy Denning.

In 4th edition, Kalak is largely unchanged and already deceased at the start of the metaplot.

Kalid-Ma: 15th Champion of Rajaat, "Tari Killer"; Male; former Sorcerer-king of Kalidnay; Cleansing unsuccessful. 2nd edition His city-state befell an unknown disaster and now lies in ruins, and Kalid-Ma's whereabouts are unknown. In 3rd edition it is explained that Kalid-Ma completed the ten-stage metamorphosis and sought to elevate is power to that of Boyrs. He was successful but went insane in the process destroying Kalidnay. He is killed by the combined efforts of the sorcerer-kings Borys, Kalak, and Hamanu. It was later revealed that he was actually trapped in Ravenloft in a comatose state by his High Templar Thakok-An. Psionic Artifacts of Athas states that the orbs of Kalid-Ma can be united and the sorcerer-king will be reborn. Originally, there was some confusion over Kalid-Ma's gender, with early sources like the Ravenloft Forbidden Lore box set and Merchant House of Amketch referring to Kalid-Ma as female, and the later Domains of Dread and Psionic Artifacts of Athas referring to him as male. This gender issue may have sprung from confusion with the real-world Hindu goddess, Kali.

In 4th edition, the cause of Kalid-Ma's death and the ruination of Kalidney unknown.

Keltis: see Oronis.

K'kriq : Thri-Kreen Mantis Warrior who was enslaved by Urik psionicists.

== L ==
Lalali-Puy: 11th Champion of Rajaat, "Arakocra Scourge"; Female; Sorcerer-queen of Gulg; Cleansing unsuccessful. Formerly known as Inenek, in the 2nd and 3rd editions she is lovingly worshiped by her citizens as the forest goddess Oba. She is one of the few sorcerer-kings who wishes to help restore the vitality to Athas, but does so because she believes she will be deified in the process.

In 4th edition, Lalali-Puy remains largely unchanged though her motivations are not explicitly stated.

== M ==
Magnus: a new race Windsinger (Elemental Air Cleric) who is a cousin of Sadira (on her Elven side). He was mutated by the residual magics around the Pristine Tower, as a consequence he does not appear, even remotely, as his 100% Elven lineage would imply. He is tall and very broad, massively built and reptilian looking.

Myron of Yorum: 4th Champion of Rajaat, "Troll Scorcher"; Male; Deceased; Cleansing unsuccessful. In the 2nd edition Myron was killed by Hamanu for displeasing Rajaat. In the 3rd edition it is explained that Myron was replaced by one of his soldiers, Manu of Deche, for some unknown failing. There is no mention of his death.

Manu: see Hamanu.

== N ==
Nibenay: 6th Champion of Rajaat, "Bane of Gnomes"; Male; Sorcerer-king of Nibenay; Exterminated the gnome race in 1229 years. He was previously known as Gallard but took the name Nibenay after rebelling against Rajaat. He rules a city-state that shares his name. Also called the Shadow King for his reclusive nature, preferring arcane scholarship to the actual governance of his city-state. In the 2nd and 3rd editions Nibenay previously left the ruling of his city-state to his exclusively female templars but took a more active role after the defeat of Rajaat at the hands of mortals.

In 4th edition Nibenay is largely unchanged but becomes more active in governing his city-state after Kalak's assassination.

Neeva: an ex-slave, a human gladiator from Tyr, she is Rikus' fighting partner and former lover.

Nok: Halfling druid who crafted the Heartwood Spear and Ktandeo's Cane which were used to kill Kalak.

== O ==
Oronis: 10th Champion of Rajaat, "Lizard Man Executioner"; Male; Sorcerer-king of Kurn; Exterminated the lizard men in 1362 years (see below). Formerly known as Keltis, in the 2nd edition Oronis distanced himself from the power struggles of the other sorcerer-kings and ruled the isolated city-state of Kurn. The 3rd edition describes Oronis as a reluctant leader who advises the ruling council of his city-state. He and his templars actively attempts to benefit his citizen and personally teaches at the local psionic school, and the School of Spies. He is seen as wise and benevolent by his people.

Oronis is not mentioned in the 4th edition campaign setting and his city-state of Kurn is listed as semi-legendary.

== P ==
Pennarin: "Centaur Crusher". Mentioned in The Rise and Fall of A Dragon King, Pennarin is the only Champion Rajaat killed in the rebellion against him. He is the most likely candidate for the title "Centaur Crusher". He is one of the three Champions known for their physical prowess, the others being Dregoth, "Ravager of Giants", and Hamanu, "Troll Scorcher".

== R ==
Rajaat: Warbringer, the First Sorcerer. A pyreen of twisted body and mind who discovered arcane magic, created the sorcerer-kings, and instigated the Cleansing War. He is imprisoned in a mysterious demiplane called the Hollow.

Rikus: an ex-slave, a mul gladiator from Tyr, he is Neeva's fighting partner and former lover.

Rkard: a mul boy, son of Neeva, who is a sun cleric. His power is limited, but is able to, at the very least, cause minor pain to Hamanu (the 4th Champion of Rajaat, The Troll-Scorcher, and King of Urik) and therefore implies the possibility to harm other Champions as well.

Rkard (King): The last great king of the dwarves. Killed by Borys. Borys' sword, Scourge, was kept in his tomb for a time.

== S ==
Sacha of Arala: 1st Champion of Rajaat, "Curse of the Kobolds"; Male; Deceased; Exterminated the kobold race in 268 years. In the 2nd and 3rd editions Sacha, along with Wyan, stayed true to Rajaat when Borys betrayed him, and was later beheaded. His headless corpse served Kalak until Tyr's lord was assassinated. Then he served Tithian until his skull was crushed by Rikus of Tyr when it was discovered he was trying to free his ancient master.

Sacha is not mentioned in the 4th edition campaign setting.

Sadira: a half-elf former slave in Tyr who was taught the ways of a preserver as a young child, she is also instrumental in the freeing of Tyr and subsequent transformation into a unique class called the sun wizard.

Sa’ram:One of the two dwarves that stole the Dark Lens. Upon dying they became banshee guardians of the talisman.

Sielba: 7th Champion of Rajaat, "Destroyer of Pterrans"; Female; former Sorcerer-queen of Yaramuke (now deceased); Cleansing unsuccessful. In the 2nd edition she helped Borys imprison Rajaat and became the sorcerer-queen of the city-state Yaramuke. Both the city-state and their queen were destroyed by Hamanu and his army. In the 3rd edition it is explained that she assaulted Urik in an effort to increase her own power, but was slain by Hamanu, and her city sacked and burned to the ground. The city-state's riches are levied to Borys to appease his anger at the sorcerer-queen's destruction.

Sielba is largely unchanged in the 4th edition of the campaign setting. The source of the conflict between Sielba and Hamanu is listed as the obsidian mines. Sielba and her city-state are destroyed because she refused to heed Hamanu's warning against prospecting on his land. Sielba was killed and her city-state destroyed but the 4th edition suggests that the city was never sacked and may still contain much of its riches.

== T ==
Tectuktitlay: 9th Champion of Rajaat, "Wemic Annihilator"; Male; Sorcerer-king of Draj; Exterminated the wemic race in 1409 years. In the 2nd edition and 3rd editions Tectuktitlay was beaten to death with the dark lens when Rajaat briefly escaped from the Hollow. He is replaced by his adopted son Atzetuk who rules largely as a figurehead.

In 4th edition Tectuktitlay still rules his city-state and is largely unchanged.

Tithian of Mericles: a nobleman who formerly served as Kalak's High Templar and who, after his death, crowns himself as King of Tyr amidst a crowd where he also abolishes slavery. Later, it is revealed that he is extremely power-hungry and evil himself, wishing to become the new Sorcerer-King of Tyr, and he attempts to free Rajaat The War Bringer.

== U ==
Uyness of Waverly: see Abalach-Re.

== W ==
Wyan of Bodach: 12th Champion of Rajaat, "Pixie Blight"; Male; Deceased; Exterminated the pixie race in 877 years. In the 2nd and 3rd editions, Wyan, along with Sacha, stayed loyal to Rajaat and both were beheaded by Borys as a result. Wyan's head survived until it was cut in half by Sadira of Tyr

Wyan is not mentioned in the 4th edition campaign setting.
