= Earth, Air, Fire, and Water =

Dungeons & Dragons rulebook

- Genre: Role-playing games
- Publisher: TSR
- Publication date: 1993

Earth, Air, Fire, and Water is an accessory for the 2nd edition of the Advanced Dungeons & Dragons fantasy role-playing game, published in 1993.

== Contents ==
Earth, Air, Fire, and Water expands the role of the cleric in the Dark Sun setting by adding new goals, duties, and abilities. As detailed in the Dark Sun Boxed Set rules, Athasian clerics do not worship gods, but instead receive spells from the four elemental planes. Earth, Air, Fire, and Water clarifies this premise, explaining that clerics form pacts with elemental entities who demand absolute devotion and obedience.

Most clerics fill one of four roles in the campaign world, serving as Wanderers (wilderness advocates of the underprivileged), Guardians of the Shrine (protectors of sacred edifices), Priests of the Cities (urban dwellers, friends of the common man), or Shamans (mysterious primitives). Each has his own responsibilities and specialties. A cleric's race also affects his role; mul clerics tend to work with Air entities, thri-kreen priests are mostly Shamans and Wanderers, working with any elemental powers but Fire.

When clerics reach 20th level, they have two options: they may continue to advance in level, or they may become elementals. Clerics who continue to advance gain access to the powerful Sphere of the Cosmos. They also tap into the para-elemental planes of Silt, Sun, Rain, and Magma, which grant powerful abilities. Clerics who become elementals leave their humanity behind, relocating to the inner planes.

Two chapters briefly address druids and templars. A druid forms a pact with the elemental powers, much the same as a cleric, though he is denied the cleric's granted powers. He also must choose between humanity and elemental transformation (becoming a “spirit of the land”) when he reaches 20th level. A templar draws magic from the elemental planes, but must funnel his request through a sorcerer-king rather than contact the entities directly. A selection of new spells rounds out the book.

== Publication history ==
Earth, Air, Fire, and Water was published as a 96-page book by TSR, Inc. Design was by Shane Lacy Hensley, editing was by Doug Stewart, the cover was by Brom and illustrations by Tom Baxa and Brom.

== Reception ==
Rick Swan reviewed Earth, Air, Fire, and Water for Dragon magazine #206 (June 1994). He felt that "cleric characters got the shaft in the original Dark Sun set", while wizards and fighters got special advantages, but "clerics were saddled with frustrating weapon and spell restrictions. Their special powers didn't amount to much, either. [...] Earth, Air, Fire, and Water (EAFW) changes all that." Calling it a "top-to-bottom touch-up", he concluded that "EAFW transforms the stodgy Dark Sun cleric into the setting's most intriguing character. It turns out those Earth clerics can do a lot more than play with rocks." He felt that the book "shifts into high gear when clerics reach 20th level". He complained about the brief chapters for druids and templars: "At seven and six pages respectively, the druid and templar chapters seem like afterthoughts; these guys deserve their own volumes." Swan concluded the review by saying: Earth, Air, Fire, and Water is so stuffed with ideas that it may take a while for referees to figure out which material best suits their campaigns. With all their granted powers, high-level clerics may find the encounters in a typical adventure a bit too easy. The deck seems stacked against the Water cleric; he has to empty his canteen to recharge his spells, a tough requirement considering the chronic water shortage in Athas. Still, for players who've thus far avoided Athasian clerics, EAFW is a revelation. It's spoiled me—I don't see how a credible Dark Sun campaign could be run without it.
