= Abiku =

Yoruba supernatural concept

Abiku is a Yoruba word that can be translated as "one who is born to die" and refers to the spirit inhabiting a child, who typically dies young. It is derived from (abi) "that which was born" and (iku) "death". In addition to the Yoruba, it is associated with the Igbo and Ijo people. In a 2004 study of 1695 women from the Ondo and Ekiti states of Nigeria, more than half of participants stated that they believed in abiku children.

== Legend ==
As with many similar cultural traditions, there are multiple stories speaking about the origins and nature of the abiku. In all of them, the abiku is a spirit which goes through a "continuous circle of birth and death". Usually this is expressed as a mother giving birth to multiple short-lived children, though some abiku may wait until later important life events such as weddings to pass away. Once a grieving mother has reached menopause, the abiku is said to sometimes move to a new mother to begin the cycle anew.

The tradition can be split into three distinct branches, each with its own presentation and attendant myths. In the first, the abiku is a spirit which shares the body of a newborn child. In this, the abiku steals a spiritual portion of the child's food intake, causing them to wither away.

In the other two, there is no distinction between the abiku and the body it inhabits. The spirit (the egbé) is either a lone agent, or a "thie[f] from heaven", and part of a gang of spirits. The thieving abiku are said to take a spiritual portion of their family's (the ilé's) worldly possessions. For example, parents may sacrifice their worldly goods in an attempt to save the abiku's life, which is seen as an expression of this theft. The gangs of abiku may have regular meetings. Whilst the mother sleeps, an abiku child will transform into a fully grown adult to attend said meetings, then return and once again change into an infant.

An abiku operating as part of a wider gang is said to be bound by an oath taken in the spirit world and attached to an object on earth, usually buried under a tree. Locating the object associated with the oath will halt the cycle of death and rebirth.

In all traditions, abiku children are said to be beautiful and sweet-natured, but in the context of thievery this is to encourage parents to lavish them with 'good things', which can subsequently be stolen. It has also been suggested that a parents admiration or cherishment of an abiku can hasten its death. To counteract this tactic and to ward off death, parents must not compliment an abiku child.

Abiku children who survive until their teenage years, or adulthood, are known as Abiku Adba: O ko ni ri Abiku-Agba, meaning May your children never suffer death at their youth and adolescence.

When not residing in a person, the spirits are believed to live in trees, especially the iroko, baobab and silk-cotton species.

=== Rituals ===
Parents of children thought to be abiku will attempt to break the cycle of death and rebirth by visiting local doctors, medicine men, or fetish priest (Babalawo). Rituals performed include scarification of the dead body or refusal to provide the child with a proper burial. The scarification is thought to permanently mark an abiku, ostracizing it from others of its kind when disembodied, and being present in some manner upon rebirth. For those who conceive of an abiku as an entity cohabiting a child's body, there have been some reports of scarification being performed on living children, with peppers being put into the fresh wounds to elicit pain. This is an effort to drive the abiku from the child's body. For male children, circumcision may be delayed.

If the abiku is still living, parents may choose specific names such as Kokumo (It does [or will] not die again) or Dúrójaiyé (Wait and enjoy life) to coax the child into remaining with them.

Another tactic performed on a living child is the use of bells and iron bangles on the neck and ankles. The sound of the bells and iron bangles are thought to keep away the spiritual fellows of the abiku.

== In Religion ==
References to the abiku have been confirmed to exist in forty-six recorded Ifá divination verses, but the number could be as high as 256.

== In Medicine ==
Seen through the lens of contemporary biomedicine, the Abiku phenomenon could have been a way of understanding sickle cell carrying.

Belief in the abiku has been shown to have health outcomes for young children. A majority of mother's surveyed in both a 1997 and 2004 study suggested that spiritual healing should be sought for abiku children over modern medicine.

== In Popular Culture ==
The abiku has appeared in the following:

- "Ben Okri's novel The Famished Road
- Debo Kotun's novel Abiku, a political satire of the Nigerian military oligarchy
- Gerald Brom's illustrated novel, The Plucker
- Wole Soyinka and J. P. Clark's poems, 'Abiku'

== See also ==
- Ogbanje
