= John T. Snyder =

American artist

- Known for: Fantasy art

John T. Snyder is an American artist whose work has appeared in role-playing games.

== Career ==
John T. Snyder is known for his artwork on the Call of Cthulhu role-playing game. He also illustrated the 5th edition cover of the Stormbringer role-playing game. His Dungeons & Dragons work includes Avengers in Lankhmar (1995), Mind Lords of the Last Sea and Defilers and Preservers for Dark Sun (both 1996), Of Ships and the Sea (1997), and The Savage Coast Monstrous Compendium.

== Reception ==
In his 2023 book Monsters, Aliens, and Holes in the Ground, RPG historian Stu Horvath reviewed the horror role-playing adventure Escape from Innsmouth (for the horror role-playing game Call of Cthulhu by Chaosium) and noted, "John T. Snyder's line work creates evocative portraits and horrific momements of action. It is one of Chaosium's best-looking books and provides the raw inspiration for one of the better Lovecraftian videogame adaptations, Call of Cthulhu: Dark Corners of the Earth."
