= Dark Sun Creature Catalog =

Role-playing game supplement

- Cover
- Rules required: Dungeons & Dragons 4th edition
- Campaign setting: Dark Sun
- Authors: Richard Baker, Bruce R. Cordell
- First published: August 17, 2010
- ISBN: 978-0-7869-5494-0

Linked modules
- D&D Rules Supplement

Dark Sun Creature Catalog is a supplement to the 4th edition of the Dungeons & Dragons role-playing game.

== Contents ==
The book details monsters, stats for major NPCs, hazards and "a section on building encounters" for the Dark Sun setting.

Shannon Appelcline, author of Designers & Dragons, commented that the "Creature Catalog features many monsters from MC12: "Monstrous Compendium Dark Sun Appendix: Terrors of the Desert" (1992) and Dark Sun Monstrous Compendium Appendix II: Terrors beyond Tyr (1995) — the original two collections of Dark Sun monsters. [...] Following in the footsteps of Dark Sun Monstrous Compendium Appendix II: Terrors beyond Tyr, this new Catalog also includes monster stats for PC races such as dwarves, eladrin, elves, goliaths, halflings, humans, mul, and thri-kreen. [...] Finally, Creature Catalog also details most of the sorcerer-kings of Athas, giving goals for high-level characters to shoot for".

== Publication history ==
Dark Sun Creature Catalog, by Richard Baker and Bruce R. Cordell, was published on August 17, 2010. Baker also led the design team for the 4th edition Dark Sun products. The book was mistakenly printed as a hardcover rather than a softcover as advertised. Despite the mistake, Wizards of the Coast sold the book at the originally advertised lower softcover price.

Appelcline wrote that "in previous years, Wizards had released a 'Campaign Guide', a 'Player's Guide', and a standalone adventure for each setting, but by 2010 things were changing for the 4e line. One of those changes impacted the schedule for setting releases. Though Dark Sun still got three books, the 'Campaign Guide' and 'Player's Guide' were combined into the Dark Sun Campaign Setting. This made room for a standalone Creature Catalog — something that was particularly important for the unique world of Athas. The adventure Marauders of the Dune Sea (2010) closed out the trilogy".

On August 19, 2014, Dark Sun Creature Catalog was re-released as a PDF.

== Reception ==
The book was reviewed in Black Gate #15.

Appelcline wrote that the "Creature Catalog doesn't add much to the world of Athas, but it is respectful of the setting's long history" and that the book "shows off D&D 4e's graphic design at its best. Many of the monsters are laid out as two-page spreads, providing lots of room for details and for variants". Appelcline highlighted that the book followed "in the footsteps of Dark Sun Monstrous Compendium Appendix II: Terrors beyond Tyr" and the inclusion of monster stats for player character races "was once more a well-received idea that helped to convey the evocative feel of the setting".

Neuroglyph Games gave the book an A rating and highlighted that "in many respects, the Dark Sun Creature Catalog is also a bit of a Dark Sun Dungeon Masters Guide, given the wealth of lore in the monster listings, the notable NPC villains, and the monster themes. And given the amount of content packed into this book, the retail price for the Dark Sun Creature Catalog is quite reasonable, and a must-have book for any Dungeon Master who plans on running a campaign on Athas".
