= Alan Pollack =

American artist (born 1964)

- Born: 1964 (age 61–62); New Jersey, United States

Alan Pollack (born 1964 in New Jersey) is an American artist whose work has appeared in role-playing games.

== Works ==
Alan Pollack produced interior illustrations for many Dungeons & Dragons books and Dragon magazine since 1994, and did the covers for Shaman (1995), Chronomancer (1995), Avengers in Lankhmar (1995), Netheril: Empire of Magic (1996), Mind Lords of the Last Sea (1996), Hellbound: The Blood War (1996), Servants of Darkness (1998), and Cormanthyr: Empire of the Elves (1998). He has also produced artwork for other games such as Werewolf: The Apocalypse (White Wolf) and Shadowrun (FASA).

He has also illustrated cards for the Magic: The Gathering and Sorcery: Contested Realm collectible card games.

Aside from TSR and Wizards of the Coast, Pollack has also worked for Del-Rey, ROC, Tor Books, Baen Books, and Upper Deck.
