= Veiled Alliance =

1992 role-playing game accessory by Allen Varney

- Author: Allen Varney
- Genre: Role-playing games
- Publisher: TSR
- Publication date: 1992

Veiled Alliance is an accessory for the 2nd edition of the Advanced Dungeons & Dragons fantasy role-playing game, published in 1992.

== Contents ==
Veiled Sun is a Dark Sun sourcebook made for Dungeon Master use.

- Description of the Veiled Alliance in each city states; along with their history, motivations, organization, and key members.
- Maps of each of the Veiled Alliance headquarters in the major city states
- Adventure hooks
- Guidelines on how to include the Veiled Alliance into a campaign setting

== Publication history ==
Veiled Alliance was written by Allen Varney and published by TSR. Doug Stewart was the editor. Brom was the cover artist, with interior art by Tom Baxa.

== Reception ==
Berin Kinsman reviewed Veiled Alliance in a 1993 issue of White Wolf. He stated that, "Overall, Veiled Alliance is one of the better products released for Dark Sun, and one of the few with crossover potential into other AD&D game worlds." Overall, he rated the game a 4 out of a possible 5.

== Reviews ==
- Casus Belli #88
