= Dragon's Crown (module) =

- Code: DSE1
- Authors: L. Richard Baker, Lisa Smedman, Kirk Botula, Geoff Pass & Alex Bund
- First published: 1993

Dragon's Crown is an adventure for the 2nd edition of the Advanced Dungeons & Dragons fantasy role-playing game, published in 1993. The module was published by TSR, Inc. and written by L. Richard Baker, Lisa Smedman, Kirk Botula, Geoff Pass and Alex Bund.

== Contents ==
Dragon's Crown is "designed for four to six characters" that are levels 10–13. According to Berin Kinsman, it's more of a "campaign pack" than a module, given that it comprises eight adventures, seven of which are part of the same storyline, while the eighth "adventure" is simply supplemental material. The contents of the module are as follows:

The main plot revolves around a mysterious "Psionatrix Field" that suddenly encompasses the planet Athas, making psionic abilities difficult to use. Even Dragon Kings and Evangions are affected, and chaos ensues. The player characters, of course, embark on a journey to discover the source of the problem and find a way to set things right.

== Publication history ==
Dragon's Crown is the final module in the series that includes Freedom, Road to Urik, Arcane Shadows, and Asticlian Gambit. It also supplements the Prism Pentad works.

== Reception ==
Berin Kinsman reviewed Dragon's Crown in the September/October 1993 issue of White Wolf Magazine, giving it an overall score of 3 out of a possible 5. He allowed that the module was good value for the money. On the negative side, he noted that TSR "recycled previously used Brom artwork" in the module, lamenting the lack of additional original artwork. However, Kinsman praised the illustrated character cards as the "best 'new' idea" included with the module.
