= The Last Sea =

- A location within the fictional setting of Narnia.
- A location within the fictional Dark Sun setting.
