= Spellfire =

Collectible card game

- The card back to the Spellfire CCG
- Designers: James Ward
- Publishers: TSR
- Players: 2+
- Playing time: Approx 90 min
- Chance: Some
- Skills: Card playing Arithmetic; Basic Reading Ability

Spellfire: Master the Magic is an out-of-print collectible card game (CCG) created by TSR, Inc. and based on their popular Dungeons & Dragons role playing game. The game appeared first in April 1994, shortly after the introduction of Magic: The Gathering, in the wake of the success enjoyed by trading card games. It was the second CCG to be released, preceding Wizards of the Coast's CCG Jyhad by two months. More than one dozen expansions for the game were released, and the final expansion was released in October 1997.

== History ==
After the successful launch of Wizards of the Coast's Magic: The Gathering card game in 1993, TSR entered the fledgling CCG market with their take on a fantasy-themed card game in June 1994. Spellfire was designed by Steve Winter, Jim Ward, Dave Cook, and Tim Brown.

Spellfire used characters, locations, magic items, artifacts, monsters, events, and spells from the intellectual properties of TSR's Dungeons & Dragons gaming worlds. However, it faced criticism immediately after release. One concern was TSR's use of artwork on Spellfire cards that had already been used on TSR's products like AD&D and Dragon Magazine. Another source of debate was Spellfire's use of completely different game mechanics.

Spellfire Reference Guide: Volume 1 and Spellfire Reference Guide: Volume 2 were also published as resources for players.

== Editions ==
The first release had a selection of 400 cards, which included cards based on the Forgotten Realms, Dark Sun, and Greyhawk settings. The basic set was packaged as a double deck (55 cards per deck), with three different levels of rarity (Common, Uncommon, and Rare), and booster packs were also sold which contained 25 more cards that were not available in the basic set.

The second edition starter pack fixed some misprints and replaced 20 first edition cards with 20 different chase cards. The artwork for the new chase cards consisted mostly of photos with fantasy-related artifacts or people in costume. The rest of this set remained identical to the first edition. The Ravenloft, Dragonlance, and Forgotten Realms booster series were released soon after the second edition. These were well received by players.

The third edition starter made some significant changes by adding powers to cards that previously had none, without changing the names and artwork. There were also significant rules corrections and updates. The Artifacts, Powers, Underdark, Runes & Ruins, and Birthright booster series added many new dimensions to the game.

The fourth edition came in a red and black double-pack, and featured 520 cards pulled from each expansion set as well as the mainline set, with more than 200 new designs. Some cards that were not updated for the 3rd edition were changed with this release. The red box in this twin-deck pack included a 55-card deck that can be played as-is, while the black box included a set of revised rules and a booster pack of 12 cards from the Draconomicon expansion. By the time the fourth edition starter pack made its debut, the future of TSR was uncertain, leading to production problems. Three more booster series, Draconomicon, Nightstalkers, and Dungeons, were released. Though they all sold out immediately, these sets were produced in small quantities. Shortly thereafter, Wizards of the Coast bought out TSR.

Before it was discontinued, Spellfire was released in six languages (English, Spanish, Portuguese, Italian, German, and French) and four editions, as well as having eleven expansions or "booster sets". Several years after Wizards of the Coast acquired TSR, they announced that they would be re-releasing Spellfire, but the project was canceled.

| Set | Release date | Cards | Packaging | Special features |
|---|---|---|---|---|
| 1st Edition | June 1994 | | 110-card double starter decks 15-card booster packs | First AD&D champions |
| Ravenloft | August 1994 | | | Rule Cards, Limbo, Power Activation |
| 2nd Edition | August 1994 | | | 20 rares replaced from 1st Edition |
| Dragonlance | September 1994 | | | Racial definitions, swimmers, earthwalkers |
| Forgotten Realms | November 1994 | | | |
| Artifacts | May 1995 | | 16-card booster packs | Darksun-oriented |
| Powers | September 1995 | | | Avatar champion |
| 3rd Edition | October 1995 | | | 20 additional rares replaced from 2nd Edition |
| The Underdark | December 1995 | | | Attack-oriented |
| Runes & Ruins | February 1996 | | 12-card booster packs | Unarmed combat cards |
| Birthright | May 1996 | | | Regents and blood abilities |
| 4th Edition | July 1996 | 500 | 55-card starter decks 12-card booster packs | Strengthened previous key cards |
| Draconomicon | July 1996 | 100, plus 25 chase cards | 12-card booster packs | Dragon-oriented |
| Nightstalkers | September 1996 | 125 | 12-card booster packs | Undead-oriented |
| Dungeons | October 1997 | 100, plus 25 chase cards | 12-card booster packs | Dungeon card |

== Gameplay ==
Spellfire allowed for any number of players without a need for any rule changes. The players win by getting six Realms cards into play, and are able to play one each turn. Players can play one Holdings cards onto each Realm to add special qualities that help defend it from attack. Players use cards for Heroes, Wizards, Clerics, Monsters, Spells, Magic Items, Artifacts, Allies and Events to defend realms and also to attack the realms of other players. After a successful attack on a realm, it is considered razed and the Realm card is turned face down, and can only be restored through the use of other cards.

Realms - Realms represent kingdoms, cities, and empires from the AD&D worlds that have sided with the player in question. The game can be won only by playing realms. It is common for a player's opponents to attack his realms or to destroy them by other means, such as spells or events. Realms are played in a pyramid-shaped formation and must be played from front to back; i.e., the first realm played goes at the top (or point) of the pyramid, the next two go in the spaces below that (left then right), and the last three go in the spaces below that. These spaces are typically labeled by letter, with the first space "A" and the last "F". In other words, the formation looks like this:

                                               A
                                              B C
                                             D E F

Champions - During his turn, a player may play champions into his "pool." He may also outfit them with magic items and artifacts. Champions are probably the most important cards in the game, as they are used to attack and defend realms. The types of champions in the original game were heroes, monsters, clerics, and wizards; later, psionicists, regents, and thieves were added.

If the player at any time had no realms, razed or unrazed, in his formation, all of the cards in his pool would be discarded at the end of his turn.

== Reception ==
Joel Halfwassen reviewed Spellfire in White Wolf #47 (Sept., 1994), rating it a 2 out of 5 and stated that "Overall, TSR has flopped with this one. Spellfire is a game that's good for 30 minutes to an hour, longer if played by followers of D&D. After that the game loses its appeal."

Scott Haring reviewed Spellfire for Pyramid #9, published in October 1994. Haring felt that the game was going to be "just the first of what is sure to be a long line of games trying to take advantage of the market that Magic opened", but found that he was "pleasantly surprised by Spellfire". He called the game "quite good", and said that the lack of original art was tempered by TSR's twenty years of art archives.

Matthew Lee and Jim Pinto for Shadis praised its simple, easy‑to‑learn rules, low cost of entry, fast multiplayer play, imaginative realm‑based mechanics, and strong use of TSR artwork with timely expansions, but criticized the blown‑up art and awkward layout, thin and fragile cardstock, poor edition compatibility, lack of balancing costs for powerful cards, and gameplay issues where turn order and expensive rare cards can dominate, even enabling first‑turn wins.

In 1995, Tomart's remarked that Spellfire was released with card backs that weren't identical between editions. For instance, "First Edition" and "Second Edition" had their names on their own respective card backs, noting these markings indicated the first appearance of the card rather than the set it was sold with. According to the authors, the cards looked "innocent" but made it "easier to cheat" because they were essentially "marked cards".

Chris Baylis reviewed some of the game's expansion sets for Arcane magazine, beginning with the Underdark booster pack, rating it a 7 out of 10 overall. He found that virtually half of the 100-card set was accounted for by its main deck-building features, namely the high-level clerics, the surplus of clerical spells, a heavy influence of powerful monsters, and the underground Realms. He felt that these cards "go a long way towards redressing the balance upset by Powers (set six), which made Psionicists almost insurmountable". Baylis reviewed the Runes & Ruins expansion set, rating it a 6 out of 10 overall. Baylis comments that "The most interesting cards of the set are the unarmed combat holds, kicks and punches, presented in a very unusual oil painting form and carrying a clenched fist symbol not yet in the rulebook." Baylis reviewed the Birthright booster pack, rating it a 5 out of 10 overall. Baylis concluded his review by saying: "Overall the Birthright expansion is of very little interest to anyone other than card collectors, with only one of the 100 cards immediately springing to mind for possible consideration as an addition to my personal gaming deck." Baylis reviewed the Draconomicon booster pack, rating it a 7 out of 10 overall. He noted that this expansion was mostly researched from the Draconomicon handbook from TSR: "As you would expect with spellcasting Wyrms, it is accented towards magic, though the set is also bolstered by events and allies that are associated with Dragons and dragonkind."

Chris Baylis reviewed the fourth edition of Spellfire for the British magazine Arcane, rating it a 6 out of 10 overall. He found the pack "striking", considering the fourth edition to have "the instant eye appeal that none of its predecessors could muster." He concluded by saying: Spellfire will never seriously rival Magic, but it does provide light, sometimes intense entertainment at a reasonable price, and when you come down to it, that is surely the essence of games playing."

Chris Baylis reviewed Night Stalkers for Arcane magazine, rating it an 8 out of 10 overall, and stated that "these photographs do a good job of showing that Spellfire is just a game that isn't meant to be taken too seriously."

== Reviews ==
- Coleção Dragão Brasil
