= Black Flames =

D&D adventure

- Code: DSM1
- First published: 1993

Black Flames is a fantasy role-playing game adventure published by TSR in 1993 for the Dark Sun campaign using the rules of the 2nd edition of the Advanced Dungeons & Dragons.

== Description ==
DSM1: Black Flames is a 122-page adventure written by Sam Witt — his first creative project for TSR — with interior artwork by David O. Miller, cover art by Gerald Brom, and cartography by David "Diesel" LaForce. It was the sixth adventure published for the Dark Sun campaign, and the first in the new "Dark Sun Missions" (DSM) series.

The adventure is designed for four to six characters of 3rd to 6th levels, and came packaged as three books: a flip book for the gamemaster, a matching flip book for the players, and an introductory short story by Lynn Abbey, "Service".

== Plot ==
Like all Dark Sun adventures, Black Flames is set on the planet of Athas. During a trip through the desert from Urik to Raam, the characters are overtaken by a ferocious standstorm. Afterwards, a small nomadic tribe comes to their rescue, offering them water. Once the characters have taken a drink, the nomads are revealed to be an illusion of the evil dragon Farcluun, who has dosed the party with a slow-acting poison. The dragon takes the characters to the ruins of the fabled city of Yaramuke, where he offers them the antidote to the poison in exchange for two ancient artifacts that are hidden somewhere in the ruined city. Once the adventurers find the required artifacts, Farcluun reneges on his deal, but before he can kill them, he is attacked by Alabach-Re. While the two dragons fight, the characters escape. Meeting a druid gives them the opportunity to cleanse the evil Black Oasis, transforming it into the healing Cool Spring. Even after they have neutralized the poison, they still have made two powerful enemies: both dragons Faarcluun and Alabach-Re now seek them.

During the adventure, the character find themselves pitted against two new types of undead: the "cursed dead", and the "hungry bodies".

== Reception ==
In the May-June 1993 edition of White Wolf Magazine (Issue 38), Berin Kinsman thought that the module was a "good adventure overall", with "enough original ideas, fresh plot twists, and Athasian flavor to keep things entertaining" as well as being a good introductory module for players new to the Dark Sun campaign.

In 2014, games historian Shannon Applecline noted that "In general, the Dark Sun adventures were quite different from the dungeon crawls that dominated D&D in the '80s. However, Black Flames showed that Dark Sun was starting to develop typical tropes of its own: a journey across the desert wilderness; a ruins crawl; and the investigation (and defense) of an oasis."

== Reviews ==
- Role Player Independent, Vol.1, Issue 7 - June 1993)
- Australian Realms #11
