= Defilers and Preservers: The Wizards of Athas =

Advanced Dungeons & Dragons supplement

- Genre: Role-playing games
- Publisher: TSR

Defilers and Preservers: The Wizards of Athas is an accessory for the 2nd edition of the Advanced Dungeons & Dragons fantasy role-playing game.

== Contents ==
Defilers and Preservers: The Wizards of Athas is a supplement which presents a full listing of all the spells that wizards on Athas have access to, compiled from the second edition Player's Handbook, The Complete Wizard's Handbook, the original Tome of Magic, and the Dark Sun Campaign Setting, Expanded and Revised. It also includes information about new magical sources that wizard characters can draw from as well as additional guidelines about the drain of magical energy. The book duplicates tables and charts found in "The Age of Heroes" booklet, joining these with the new procedures to provide a single magical source for players. The book introduces 13 new wizard character kits. It includes a full set of transformation rules for 20th level wizards to become psionic powered 21st level dragons or good-aligned avangions. Defilers and Preservers also presents 13 new proficiencies and 61 new spells, and 10th level psionic enchantments that have the ability to alter reality.

== Publication history ==
Defilers and Preservers: The Wizards of Athas was published by TSR in 1996 as a 96-page book. It was designed by Nicky Rea, and featured cover illustrations by Maren, and interior illustrations by John T. Snyder.

== Reception ==
David Comford reviewed Defilers and Preservers: The Wizards of Athas for Arcane magazine, rating it a 9 out of 10 overall. According to Comford, Defilers and Preservers offers defiler and preserver characters the chance to have power like that of the sorcerer kings as they slowly and surely transform into beasts like the Dragon. While the book expands on much material from previous books "to create a complete magical tome to refer to, instead of the constant scrabbling between countless books that normally results in an AD&D game", he feels that the new material is the "real value of the book". He felt that the new character kits "greatly expands the gaming potential for magic users". He felt that the artwork is "mostly of a good, sketch-like quality and complements the text, which has a well-indexed layout and is easily followed". Comford concluded that "Defilers and Preservers is essential for anyone planning to run or play wizards in the Dark Sun setting. The new and expanded rules and details are not just merely useful, but flesh out the lives, abilities and skills of the arcane scholars."
