= Metaplot =

Form of story-line

The metaplot (also, metastory) is the overarching storyline that binds together events in the official continuity of a published role-playing game campaign setting, also defined as an "evolving history of a given fictional universe". Major official story events that change the world, or simply move important non-player characters from one place to another, are part of the metaplot for a game. Metaplot information is usually included within gaming products such as rule books and modules as they are released. Major events in the metaplot are often used to explain changes in the rules in between versions of the games, as was the case with the Time of Judgment in White Wolf's World of Darkness and the Time of Troubles and the Sundering for TSR's/Wizards of the Coast's Forgotten Realms. Because of events like this, many gaming groups choose to ignore the metaplot for a game entirely.

Metaplot is often developed not just by the writers, but by teams - multiple writers, editors, publishers, graphic designers and even players. The concept is related to more than just role-playing sourcebooks, as much of the metaplot can come from other media, such as novels (for example, The Legend of Drizzt or the Dragonlance novels, representative of numerous Dungeons & Dragons fiction). For the Forgotten Realms this was the case only after its inception, while it was part of the design from the start for the Dark Sun setting. For campaign settings based on movies, TV shows or other pieces of fiction, the plot of those works usually functions as the metaplot, while for historical settings history itself may fill this role.

Metaplot appears in settings of various genres like The Dark Eye, Deadlands, Dragonlance, Fading Suns, Legend of the Five Rings, and Shadowrun.

== Reception ==
The metaplot is meant to "give the players a sense of immersion in a large and complex world as well as an aesthetic appreciation of the story they were witnessing" whenever their characters come into contact with it. The narrative tool of metaplot has been criticised for shifting the focus away from the player characters and making them "marginal rather than central figures".

Role-playing game designer Jasmin Neitzel commented that metaplot could facilitate constructive interaction of players with a game setting within and beyond individual gaming groups, but could be a hindrance in getting beyond harmful stereotypes used in past products.

Olaf Pajączkowski notes that the metaplot constraints reduce the freedom of writers, who have to respect the history and present events in the universe (as many books are set in the present), and they cannot "break the world". Pajączkowski gives an example of Elaine Cunningham's novel Reclamation which was cancelled because the metaplot evolved changing the world (a 100-year jump) making her book 'obsolete', and the publisher decided it's not worth finishing as it was no longer set in the "present" of the evolving Forgotten Realms universe.
