= The Child Thief =

2009 dark fantasy novel by Gerald Brom

- First edition cover (publ. HarperCollins)
- Author: Gerald Brom
- Language: English
- Genre: Dark fantasy
- Published: 2009
- Publisher: HarperCollins

The Child Thief is a 2009 dark fantasy novel by the artist and novelist Gerald Brom. A dark retelling of the stories of Peter Pan and the Lost Boys, Brom takes many liberties with the originals by J. M. Barrie. Brom incorporates monsters and faeries, as well as a poverty-ridden populace in New York.

== Synopsis ==
The novel begins with a prologue. A young girl awaits her abusive father, only to be rescued by a boy with auburn hair, freckles, pointy ears, and golden eyes. He comforts the girl, telling her of a place where there are no grown-ups and lots of adventure. The girl goes with him.

The novel follows several characters in their adventures through Avalon, an enchanted isle in its final death throes. Brom makes liberal use of Celtic and Scottish mythology as, in a parallel storyline, he describes Peter's history from birth to Lord of Deviltree.

In the modern day, a child named Nick flees his home with a bag full of methamphetamine. A gang of drug dealers has taken over his home, abusing him while his mother and grandmother are powerless to do anything. His first night on the run he is pursued by the gang members and runs into Peter. Peter displays superhuman speed and strength, driving the gang members off. He tells Nick about Avalon and convinces him to come there. Nick makes it through the mist to Avalon, joining up with the other children Peter has taken there over the years (many of whom have not aged a day since arriving in Avalon).

Peter's clan of human children is the final force between the Flesh Eaters and The Lady. The Lady's magic keeps Avalon alive and the Mist up to keep out unwanted humans while keeping the Flesh Eaters in. The Lady is trapped within the heart of Avalon, a prisoner in her own land by her nephew and Avalon's heir apparent, Lord Ulfger (who shares the same father as Peter).

The children at Deviltree are also affected by the magic of Avalon. However, being children, they were not twisted into malicious scaly creatures. Instead they grew strong, fast, and amazingly powerful while their eyes changed color to match their leader's eyes. They were honed into warriors, fighting alongside Peter to save Avalon and The Lady and rid the land of the Flesh Eaters. Their predecessors were revealed to be pagan and druid children fleeing from enslavement, persecution and execution by knights working on behalf of the church.

Peter spends his time searching for new children to take back to Avalon. Always searching in the poorest neighborhoods, Peter only takes those children that are abused, forgotten, or, his personal favorite, runaways. Many children die in the Mist. Many more die fighting for their lives in Avalon, and Peter must go out seeking new blood candidates for Deviltree.

Ulfgar, out of jealousy, leads the children of Deviltree into an ambush where many of them are killed and many more are captured by the Flesh Eaters (he then brainwashes one new recruit, self-serving Leroy to murder and further betray for him). The Flesh Eaters during this time are revealed to be a group of English Puritans who sailed to Avalon accidentally while en route to North America. They want to go home and believe that killing the Lady is their only way to do so. In reality she could dispel the mists and allow them to leave, but neither side trusts the other enough to try and communicate.

After being tortured (during which one Devil, feral child Redbone due to his sustained injuries does not survive the process), some of the devils lead the Flesh Eaters to the Lady's hiding place and they kidnap her (on discovering Leroy's treachery Peter executes him as Leroy shows his true colors and cowardly tries to shift blame from himself). Avalon dissolves around them and everyone is swept to New York City. The Flesh Eaters are startled by their surroundings, some even believing themselves to have entered Heaven, and cause a panic among anyone who sees them, which leads them to kill several police officers who come to investigate them.

The Flesh Eaters go to Central Park to execute the Lady, only for Peter and the remaining devils to attack in a desperate rescue attempt. During the battle, Ulfgar reappears and, having absorbed some of Avalon's remaining magic, has turned into some sort of monster. The Flesh Eaters and devils briefly join forces to defeat him during which almost all of them are slain by him. Ulfgar is killed and the Lady restores Avalon. Nick is mortally wounded during the battle and with his last breaths makes Peter swear to kill the gang living in his old house.

The remaining devils, now only one or two who are left out of the well over three dozen before, head back to rebuild Avalon while Peter heads off to fulfill his promise.

== Literary analysis ==
=== Children as warriors ===
The children become merciless, bloodthirsty and savage. Taken from abusive homes, they leave for a place where there are children from similar backgrounds. Brom discusses how this relates to gang culture. The children are slowly affected by Avalon's magic and become a powerful force. This knowledge of superiority coupled with the right circumstance could easily cause innocent children to become killing machines. Judging from what goes on in modern gang culture, seeing how quick teens are to define their own morals, to justify any action no matter how horrific, I believe it wouldn't be that hard. (Brom, The Child Thief)

=== Humans as monsters ===
The Flesh Eaters were a group of Puritans who set out to the new world from England, as well as the crews of the ships that carried them. They became trapped in Avalon when their arrival promoted the Lady of the Lake to shroud the island in a magical mist to avoid further arrivals. When they came to Avalon they were people no worse or better than others of their time, but after 300 years they have degenerated in body and soul to resemble demonic creatures with horn and black scales. In addition to being corrupted by the magic of Avalon, their desperation to escape over the long years have driven them to further madness. In the most extreme cases they have become twisted caricatures of themselves, so that The Reverend, originally a just and inspiring man has become no more than a fanatical sadist. Even those among the group who have not fallen into degeneracy mostly go along with those who have, either out of fear, complacency or simply the desire to band together against the dangers of the land.

The beasts of Avalon were—before the Flesh Eaters—a light and airy people who cared only for merriment and joy, and even when danger or serious matters pressed upon them. They worship the pagan gods of the land, who live and walk among them. They would like nothing more than for the Flesh Eaters to leave, which is the same goal the Flesh Eaters have, though by the time of the novel the hatred between them has grown too deep for them to work together on any common task.

== Characters ==
=== Devils ===
- Peter: A main character and "Lord" of Deviltree, his only apparent goal is to gather children to fight the Flesh Eaters and save Lady Modron. Peter's mood often changes between that of a hardened warrior and a child, especially when recalling fallen Devils. He has red hair, pale, freckled skin, golden eyes, and pointy ears. He wears hand-stitched leather pants with pointy-toed shoes sewn in, a raggedy, tailed tuxedo jacket over a black hoodie, and a rawhide pack.
- Nick: A major character, Nick's story begins as he runs away from home, where a drug lord tenant and his minions torment Nick, his mother, and his grandmother. He is cornered by several other boys when Peter comes to his rescue. Once they are through the Mist he is left with the other Devils as a "new blood". Nick is fourteen, slender and a bit small for his age, with dark, choppy bangs, and a pallid complexion.
- Cricket: A New Blood at Deviltree, she arrived there a little before Nick. It is implied she was the girl from the prologue. She becomes good friends with Nick, and there is some attraction between them. She has a scar above her ear where her hair no longer grows, from before she came to Avalon.
- Sekeu: The most experienced warrior at Deviltree with the exception of Peter, she has been in Avalon since the first colonists settled in America. She is Native American, with golden eyes, dark hair, lean, muscular features, and a regal bearing. She teaches the New Bloods at Deviltree how to fight, and acts as leader when Peter is out.
- Redbone: He has been at Deviltree since 1974 and is one of Peter's more experienced warriors, described by others as a wild feral child. He rubs a red dye into his skin and hair, creating a devilish effect, and ties a red bone into the wild top knot on his head. He wears a beat-up, but genuine, leather jacket. His grin is fierce and wide and his eyes are squinty and fiendish. A scar runs down his face right between his eyes that he got from his pimp, prior to being brought to Avalon.
- Leroy: The most experienced of the New Blood, Leroy is crafty and self-serving. He bullies and intimidates Nick, and eventually becomes a Devil by falsely claiming to have performed Nick's acts of bravery. He fled to Avalon to escape punishment for murdering his father and later is brainwashed by Lord Ulfger to betray the other Devils.
- Abraham: A one handed former runaway slave who has been in Avalon for well over a century. After Sekeu he is the most experienced of fighters who helps her train the new recruits.
- Dirk and Dash: Both of whom were always in a fight with one another but still neither were never apart. Dirk has a resemblance to a bulldog with shaved scalp and ragged, jagged, ritual scaring. Dash is said to have a slight under-bite and is covered with piercings of bone and metal over parts of his face and nipples.
- Danny: Another New Blood recruit. Described as a pre-teen who is pudgy and bespectacled whose glasses are wrapped round his head with a strap. He is one of the very few Devils to survive.
- Amos: A Devil who once lived in an Amish community prior to be shunned and cast out. Ever since his banishment and being brought to Avalon, he has been by Peter's side.
- Cutter: A Devil who is said to be a serious, reserved kid, with dark, severe eyes. He is known for being one who is of few words who seems to keep himself to himself.
- Ivy: A Devil who was left with a lazy eye by her mother after she was kicked for wearing makeup. She is known for her distinct curly hair.
- Nathan: An ill-fated twelve year old potential recruit. He was brought to Avalon having been saved after seeing his older brother Tony get murdered for causing a drug shipment to be accidentally destroyed.
- Billy: A former Devil who ended up being captured by the Flesh Eaters. Because of him they were then able to learn about the current state of the outside world.
- The Lady: Peter and his followers live to serve the Lady. Lady Modron (also known as The Lady of the Lake), daughter of the god Avallach, rules as the queen of Avalon. It appears that she uses her healing powers to entrance the inhabitants of Avalon into a spell of unconditional love, and devotion to her and Avalon itself.
