= Shaman (Dungeons & Dragons supplement) =

- Genre: Role-playing games
- Publisher: TSR
- Publication date: 1995

Shaman is an accessory for the 2nd edition of the Advanced Dungeons & Dragons fantasy role-playing game, published in 1995.

== Contents ==
Shaman details the shaman character class, which calls upon spirits to ask them for magic in the form of favors; these are not undead, but rather they are spirits of anything from the living world including that of nature or of ancient ancestors. Unlike other types of magic, favors can be called for as many times per day as needed until the shaman fails to make a successful wisdom check. A shaman chooses favors and keeps those same favors for life. This book also presents hooks for a dozen adventure scenarios.

== Publication history ==
Shaman was designed by Kevin Hassall, and published by TSR in 1995. Cover and border art was by Alan Pollack, with interior art by Randy Post, Mark Nelson, Valerie Valusek, and Karl Waller.

== Reception ==
Trenton Webb reviewed Shaman for Arcane magazine, rating it a 5 out of 10 overall. According to Webb, the book "rewrites the earth magic AD&D rules. Out go the pilfered priests spells and mumbo jumbo of the Barbarian's and Humanoid's Handbooks, and in comes a batch of very different magic and brand-new mumbo jumbo." He considered shamans "a problematic bunch" because he thought their presence in the game "insists that certain existing characters and NPCs must be reworked or anomalies endured", and found their magic system "fresh but restrictive". As far as making a shaman player character, he felt that "only the foolhardy would turn their freshly rolled heroes into full shamen. On the other hand, capable players could explore the foibles of shamanism as a split class. Shamen as described here, though, are most suited to NPC status". He did consider the adventure hooks "excellent". Webb concluded that "There's no essential reason to buy Shaman. Its ideas and magic system are promising, but getting the most out them will be a long and painful rite of passage."
