= Dark Knight of Karameikos =

1995 novel by Timothy Brown

- Cover of the first edition
- Author: Timothy Brown
- Language: English
- Genre: Fantasy novel
- Published: 1995
- Publication place: United States
- Media type: Print
- ISBN: 0-7869-0307-4

Dark Knight of Karameikos is a fantasy novel by Timothy Brown, set in the world of Mystara, and based on the Dungeons & Dragons role-playing game. It is based on the Mystara setting. It was published in paperback edition in October 1995.

== Plot summary ==
Dark Knight of Karameikos is a novel in which the knight Sir Grygory of Karameikos fights against the evil forces that are menacing the land of Traldara.

== Reception ==
Gideon Kibblewhite reviewed Dark Knight of Karameikos for Arcane magazine, rating it a 7 out of 10 overall. He notes that "Timothy Brown is director of game development at TSR and so was a major player in the creation of Mystara, the setting for this, his first novel." He calls the novel "exciting, though not original" and adds: "If the tale of revenge, self-doubt and ultimate courage is an ordinary one, it is also well-told and pacey, and builds to a breathless ending." Kibblewhite ends his review by saying: "Dark Knight of Karameikos provides a rich vein of source material as well. The author's descriptive flair and his attention to detail adds much flesh to this world. There is much information to be had about its history and culture which is particularly important if players want to be knights running about in shining armour. Required reading for selfless heroes."
