= Hellbound: The Blood War =

Role-playing game accessory

- Genre: Role-playing games
- Publisher: TSR
- Media type: Boxed set

Hellbound: The Blood War is an accessory for the 2nd edition of the Advanced Dungeons & Dragons fantasy role-playing game.

== Contents ==
Hellbound: The Blood War - a Deluxe Adventure & Accessory is a supplement which reveals the secrets of the Blood War, a conflict between two races that has been waged across the planes for many years. The 80-page booklet "Dark of the Blood War" presents the nature of the fiends and the history of the war, as well as the magic, and the ranks and strategies used in the war. The "War Games" book contains three adventures which involve the player characters in the conflicts of the Blood War. The booklet "The Chant of the Blood War" provides background information to players for a Blood War campaign. "Visions of War" is a booklet containing illustrations relating to the adventures for the Dungeon Master to show players at appropriate points. Also included is a 16-page full-color comic book.

== Publication history ==
Hellbound: The Blood War was published by TSR in 1996 as a boxed set containing 5 books. "War Games" is a 96-page book designed by Colin McComb and Monte Cook, with cover art by Alan Pollack and interior art by Adam Rex. "The Dark of the War" is an 80-page book designed by Colin McComb and Monte Cook, with cover art by Alan Pollack and interior art by Adam Rex. "The Chant of the War" is a 31-page book designed by Colin McComb, with cover art by Robh Ruppel and interior art by Adam Rex and DiTerlizzi. "The Bargain" is a 13-page comic book featuring a story by Jeff Grubb, with art by Robh Ruppel and Tony DiTerlizzi. "Visions of War" is a 23-page booklet designed by Colin McComb and Monte Cook, with graphic design and cover art by Dawn Murin and interior art by DiTerlizzi.

== Reception ==
Trenton Webb reviewed Hellbound: The Blood War for Arcane magazine, rating it an 8 out of 10 overall. He felt that the secrets it delivers were "a little disappointing, but it does flesh out a savage game setting in stunning detail". He considered "Dark of the Blood War" the focal point of the boxed set, calling the book "superb stuff, fact-packed, well written and full of character". He called the scenarios in the "War Games" book "adventures for the seriously suicidal", as the Blood War "is not a very clever place for the unprepared or inexperienced", although he felt the adventures "play to the different strengths of the Blood War" and noted that "while bargaining with, fighting and double-crossing Pit Fiends and Balors is hazardous, the roleplay buzz of doing so makes it almost worth the gamble". Regarding "The Chant of the Blood War", Webb calls it "Contradictory, confusing and packing just enough clues to whet the appetite, the "Chant" works. After reading it any character worth their swagger will realise the risk of getting embroiled in the Blood War, but think that they've got the measure of it." He said that with the "Visions of War" book, Hellbound "hammers home" the advantage of the Planescape setting's attention to detail, "with manuals written in a coherent style, all of which is backed up with brilliantly bizarre artwork". He also said that "The Bargain" comic "encapsulates the peculiar nature of the Planescape multiverse", but that the comic and "Visions of War" extras "don't add that much to the game, but they'll help DMs get a grasp on the world they're running". Webb concludes the review by saying "Hellbound doesn't quite delve deep enough into the background of the Blood War to be a classic. It does, however, bring this battle to life. A huge work with three excellent supporting adventures, this is an absolute must for all Planescape DMs. So, Planescape players had better start praying - life's about to get very bloody and cheap, extremely quickly!"
