= Mind Lords of the Last Sea =

Role-playing game supplement

- Cover art by Alan and Maren Pollack
- Author: Matt Forbeck
- Genre: Role-playing games
- Publisher: TSR
- Publication date: 1996

Mind Lords of the Last Sea is a fantasy role-playing game supplement published by TSR in 1996 for the Dark Sun campaign setting using the rules system of the 2nd edition of the Advanced Dungeons & Dragons..

== Description ==
Mind Lords of the Last Sea is part of the "Wanderer's Chronicles" line for the Dark Sun setting, intended to explore areas of Athas located far away from the city of Tyr. The boxed set includes a map of the region as well as two booklets.

The first booklet describes the last remaining lake on the desert planet, a vestige of ancient times when the world was green, and details a society which has been kept isolated from the rest of the world for thousands of years by the will of three psionicists. These psionicists have become immortal and require everyone in the city of the Mind Lords to be happy by using the restless face mental harmonization, which keeps everything quiet in the area. The supplement presents new rules, equipment, and modes of behavior related to the area, including the beach druids that spend their time surfing.

The second booklet includes a short scenario, "In the Lands of the Last Sea". One of the player characters has their brain stolen, and the rest of the party must try to recover it. The investigation that follows will take them to the main communities of the region.

== Publication history ==
TSR published the Dark Sun campaign setting in 1991, and followed this with other publications, including a line of supplements titled "the "Wanderer's Chronicles." One of these was Mind Lords of the Last Sea, created by Matt Forbeck with cover art by Alan and Maren Pollack, interior art by John T. Snyder, and cartography by Dennis Kauth and Robert Lazzaretti. It was published in 1996.

== Reception ==
In Issue 5 of the British magazine Arcane, Cliff Ramshaw compared Mind Lords of the Last Sea to another Dark Sea supplement, Windriders of the Jagged Cliffs, and commented "Mind Lords, by comparison, fails to convince". Ramshaw called the included adventure "poor" as the player's first experience of the Last Sea area, complaining that there was hardly anything to kill and that most of the characters' time was spent tracking down the missing brain: "It's one of those adventures where the very existence of the entire realm hangs in the balance, which is all very well for high-level characters, but it seems over-the-top for new arrivals on the scene. And, to top it all, the characters' actions don't affect the outcome. If they succeed (or rather fail, since there's a time-travel twist involved) then all's fine; if they fail, then a super-powerful Mind Lord comes along to set everything to rights anyway." Ramshaw concluded by giving the supplement a poor rating of 4 out of 10, calling it "Contrived and pointless."

In Issue 93 of the French games magazine Casus Belli, Tristan Lhomme wrote, "Mind Lords of the Last Sea lets you discover the last region untouched by the sorcerer-kings. As the title suggests, the Last Sea and its environs are ruled by terrifyingly powerful psionicists, whose motto is 'happiness is obligatory.' Certain passages will bring back fond memories for Paranoia players or The Prisoner fans." However, Lhomme found the included adventure scenario "a little too ambitious to be really interesting" and suggested "Mind Lords is better suited to veteran players eager to discover new challenges."
