= Timothy Brown (game designer) =

American game designer and editor

Timothy B. Brown
- Occupations: Writer; editor; game designer
- Writing career
- Period: 1986–2005
- Genres: Role-playing games, dice games, collectible card games

Timothy B. Brown is an American game designer, primarily of role-playing games. He has been a designer at Game Designers' Workshop, an editor at Challenge magazine, and the director of product development at TSR.

== Career ==
=== GDW ===
Marc Miller, Frank Chadwick, Lester Smith, and Timothy Brown of GDW designed the new game Traveller: 2300 (1986) as an expansion of the original Traveller role-playing game. Brown also designed the Gamer's Choice Award-winning Star Cruiser board game. Brown served as editor of GDW's Challenge magazine.

=== TSR ===
Brown went to work for TSR in 1989, eventually reaching the level of Director of Game Development. Brown was TSR's director of product development from 1991 to 1995, and oversaw the creation of their Ravenloft and Planescape game lines, among many other titles. Brown co-created the AD&D Dark Sun setting with Troy Denning and Mary Kirchoff. Brown and Denning led the Dark Sun project, with the assistance of fiction editor Kirchoff, and artist Brom soon joined them and helped to make Dark Sun world design more distinct from the other TSR settings, adding a new more artistic sensibility. Brown and Denning also put together the 1991 D&D "black box" set, which became a top-seller for TSR with half a million copies sold over the next six years. Brown contributed to the design of Spellfire.

=== After TSR ===
Brown later founded his company Destination Games and also worked with Imperium Games. Destination Games produced Chaos Progenitus dice game (1996) and Pulp Dungeons: Uninvited Guests (1997) authored by Gary Gygax.

For the fourth edition of Traveller published by Imperium Games in 1996, the designers each worked on separate portions of the rules, with Brown writing about aliens. Sweetpea Entertainment bought out the stock of the creators of T4 and took charge of some of the day-to-day operations of Imperium; Brown took charge of the company guided by Sweetpea, and was the only remaining staff member of Imperium, with others working for the company as freelancers. Brown, James Ward, Lester Smith, John Danovich, and Sean Everette founded the short-lived d20 publishing company Fast Forward Entertainment (circa 2001–2005).

Brown also contributed to the designs of The Wheel of Time Collectible Card Game (1999) and the Dragon Ball Z Collectible Card Game (2000).

== Bibliography ==
- Mobley, Blake; Brown, Timothy B. (1990). Greyhawk Ruins. WGR1. World of Greyhawk: TSR, inc. p. 128. ISBN 0-88038-860-9. 9292XXX1401.
- Dark Sun: Campaign Setting (Advanced Dungeons & Dragons, 2nd Edition) by Timothy B. Brown and Troy Denning (1991)
- Dark Sun: Dragon Kings (2nd Edition) by Timothy B. Brown (1992)
- Wondrous Items of Power by Karen; Brown, Timothy; Ward, James M. Edited by Boomgaarden (2002)
- 2300 AD - Man's Battle For the Stars [BOX SET] by Marc Miller, Timothy B. Brown, Lester W. Smith, and Frank Chadwick (1988)
- Official Price Guide to Role Playing Games by Timothy Brown and Tony Lee (1998)
- Green Races by Timothy Brown and James A. Ward (2002)
- Advanced Dungeons & Dragons: Dark Sun, The Wanderer's Journal by Troy Denning and Timothy B. Brown (1991)
- Fighting Ships, Supplement 9, Traveller by Tim Brown, Frank Chadwick, and Marc Miller (1981).

=== Dungeons & Dragons novels ===
- Dark Knight of Karameikos (1995)

== Personal life ==
Brown is an accomplished guitar player and teacher.
