= Traveller Supplement 9: Fighting Ships =

Science-fiction role-playing game supplement

Supplement 9: Fighting Ships
- Designers: Tim Brown
- Publishers: Game Designers' Workshop
- Publication: 1981
- Genres: Science-fiction
- Systems: Classic Traveller

Traveller Supplement 9: Fighting Ships is a tabletop role-playing game supplement, written by Tim Brown, with illustrations by Jennell Jaquays, (Note: Credited as Paul Jaquays.) for Traveller and published in 1981 by Game Designers' Workshop.

== Contents ==
Fighting Ships presents 25 different ships that the Imperium uses, ranging from a 20-ton gig to a 500,000-ton dreadnought. The supplement uses the rules and combat systems from a previous supplement, High Guard. Each ship class is presented with game statistics, descriptions of its components, and background information. Thirteen Traveller supplements were published. A single collected volume was published by Far Future Enterprises in 2000.

== Reception ==
In the December 1981 edition of The Space Gamer (Issue No. 46), William A. Barton gave a thumbs up, saying, "Fighting Ships is well worth adding to your Traveller collection."

However, in the December 1981 edition of Dragon (Issue 56), although Tony Watson called the supplement "very interesting reading for those of us enamored with spaceships and all that goes with them", he questioned why players or referees would buy the book. "It is highly unlikely that any player character is going to acquire a ship of this great size and capability."

== See also ==
- Classic Traveller Supplements
