= Dune Trader =

Role-playing game accessory

- Genre: Role-playing games
- Publisher: TSR
- Publication date: 1992

Dune Trader is an accessory for the 2nd edition of the Advanced Dungeons & Dragons fantasy role-playing game, published in 1992.

== Contents ==
Dune Trader includes the Trader, a new character class for Dark Sun. It is limited to humans, elves, and half-elves and advances similarly to Rogues.

== Publication history ==
The module was published by TSR and written by Anthony Pryor.

== Reception ==
Berin Kinsman reviewed the module in the March–April 1993 issue of White Wolf Magazine. He stated that TSR had likely not deeply covered the module's topic of merchants in this manner before. Kinsman suggested that the module was "a good supplement for Dungeon Masters and players who like the type of well-rounded background information that makes a campaign more 'real'". He rated it an overall 3 out of a possible 5.

== Reviews ==
- Casus Belli #80
