= The Will and the Way (module) =

- Author: L. Richard Baker III
- Genre: Role-playing games
- Publisher: TSR
- Publication date: 1994
- Pages: 95

The Will and the Way is an accessory for the 2nd edition of the Advanced Dungeons & Dragons fantasy role-playing game, published in 1994.

== Contents ==
The Will and the Way offers an assortment of new kits (including the Beastmaster and the Sensai, a martial-arts master), along with a supplementary set of rules for mental combat, suitable for any campaign using psionic characters. The appendix introduces 60-plus new sciences and devotions, many of extraordinary power.

The Will and the Way is a companion to The Complete Psionics Handbook that adds more information on psionics and psionicist characters for the Dark Sun campaign setting. This sourcebook presents new character kits, special proficiencies for the psionicist, and adds new rules for psionic combat, new psionic powers, and rules for creating psionic powers and artifacts. It also describes how psionics are used within the different regions of the setting.

== Publication history ==
The Will and the Way was written by L. Richard Baker III, and published by TSR, Inc. The Will and the Way was published in June 1994.

== Reception ==
Rick Swan reviewed The Will and the Way for Dragon magazine #213 (January 1995). He commented that although the book was "included as part of the Dark Sun line, this could more accurately be considered a sequel to The Complete Psionics Handbook. Swan concludes the review by saying: "These psionicists are guys you don't want to cross."
