= Psionic Artifacts of Athas =

1996 role-playing game accessory

- Genre: Role-playing games
- Publisher: TSR
- Publication date: 1996

Psionic Artifacts of Athas is an accessory for the 2nd edition of the Advanced Dungeons & Dragons fantasy role-playing game, published in 1996.

== Contents ==
Psionic Artifacts of Athas is a supplement which details the new artifacts featured in the Prism Pentad series of novels, and includes advice on how to make use of them in an adventure. The book also describes the life-shaped items, which are living items created during the ancient Blue age of Athas, and when worn or wielded they can meld with the skin or bond with characters to create hidden weapons or impart special abilities. The book includes 49 charts to allow the artifacts to be modified or redesigned to fit more appropriately into an existing adventure.

== Publication history ==
Psionic Artifacts of Athas was published by TSR, Inc. in 1996.

== Reception ==
David Comford reviewed Psionic Artifacts of Athas for Arcane magazine, rating it an 8 out of 10 overall. He notes that "Among other releases, the Prism Pentad series of novels irrecoverably changed the Dark Sun setting and resulted in a revised, second edition of the system, and a series of expansion supplements which seek to bring the referee back up to speed with exactly what is happening on Athas." Comford continued: "Psionic Artifacts of Athas details the artefacts used within the novels and consequently introduces a plethora of new items and rediscovered ancient relics. A minor drawback of the supplement is that the majority of the artefacts detailed here are simply far too powerful to be given to players - The Dark Lense used by Rajaat to imbue the sorcerer-kings with their horrific powers being a prime example - but they do offer excellent focuses for campaigns." He mentioned that "The most exciting objects found within the volume, however, are the life-shaped items [...] and each of these intriguing and unusual artefacts has full statistics and ability details." Comford concludes his review by saying, "Four major items from The Book of Artifacts are not detailed however, and this unfortunately lends an air of incompleteness to the supplement which otherwise would have been a comprehensive guide to the psionic and magical items to be found on the world. Nevertheless this sourcebook is a must for referees."

== Reviews ==
- Casus Belli #100
