= Dragon Kings (Dark Sun) =

Tabletop role-playing game supplement

- Author: Timothy Brown
- Genre: Role-playing game
- Publisher: TSR
- Publication date: 1992
- Media type: Print (Hardcover)

Dragon Kings is an accessory for the Dark Sun campaign setting for the Dungeons & Dragons fantasy role-playing game. The book was written by Timothy Brown, and was published in 1992.

== Contents ==
Dragon Kings features tips for taking player characters from the Dark Sun setting all the way to 30th level. The first section of the book offers rules for creating high-level warriors, along with Battlesystem options, and 50-plus pages of high-powered spells.

Dragon Kings are the most powerful characters of Athas, and rule the world. This book provides information on these advanced beings, the new magical spells available to them, plus new psionic devotions and organizations, military vehicles and army lists, and more.

== Publication history ==
Dragon Kings was written by Timothy B. Brown and published by TSR, Inc.

== Reception ==
Berin Kinsman reviewed the module in the March/April issue of White Wolf magazine. He stated that "Over all, Dragon Kings is an attractive package with useful information for AD&D aficionados in general and Dark Sun buffs in particular." He rated it as a 3 out of a possible 5.

Rick Swan reviewed Dragon Kings for Dragon magazine #197 (September 1993). He commented that "Power-mad players who feel constrained by the level limits imposed by the standard AD&D rules should delight in this Dark Sun supplement". He thought that the rules for creating "stratospheric-level warriors" were "interesting", and called the Battlesystem options "useful but nonessential". He felt that "the real action" is in high-powered spells, giving examples of a spell which conjures a fortified tower more than 100 yards tall, a spell which creates up to a 480-yard radius forest with as many as 36,000 trees, and a spell to animate as many as 4,000 skeletons from an ancient civilization. He commented that "Dungeon Masters may shudder at the thought of coming up with scenarios to challenge 30th-level PCs—what are they gonna do, fight planets?"

== Reviews ==
- Australian Realms #7
- Coleção Dragon Slayer
