= Marauders of the Dune Sea =

Dungeons & Dragons adventure module

- Cover
- Rules required: Dungeons & Dragons 4th edition
- Campaign setting: Dark Sun
- First published: August 2010
- ISBN: 9780786954957

Marauders of the Dune Sea is an adventure for the 4th edition of the Dungeons & Dragons role-playing game.

== Contents ==
This 32-page softcover contains an adventure module that starts in the city of Tyr and "is designed to take characters from 2nd to 5th level". Shannon Appelcline, author of Designers & Dragons, wrote that encounters "are mostly combat-focused. There's no meaningful roleplaying in Marauders of the Dune Sea, except in the plot hooks leading into the adventure. Two skill challenges do provide some variety, but one of them was widely disliked because it required players to repeat the challenge until they succeeded".

=== Non-Canon Dark Sun ===
This adventure includes several details that are inconsistent with the canon of the Dark Sun campaign setting, such as:

- The poster map includes oxen and horses, however these creatures are extinct on Athas.
- An encounter map includes an underground stream even though water is rare in Athas.
- Athas does not have a lot of metal, however the cover of the adventure book shows steel weapons.
- "The appearance of an Urikite templar in the heart of Tyr".
- "The use of a written note as a plot hook in a world that is primarily illiterate".
- "The alliance of Thri-kreen and elves, two races that hate each other".
- "The inclusion of magic items in treasure parcels, rather than the alternative treasures suggested in Dark Sun Campaign Setting".

== Publication history ==
Marauders of the Dune Sea, by Bruce R. Cordell, is the official Dark Sun adventure for 4th edition Dungeons & Dragons, and was published by Wizards of the Coast in August 2010. A sequel adventure, Revenge of the Marauders, by Cordell was published in Dungeon #183 (October 2010). On July 21, 2015, Marauders of the Dune Sea was re-released as a PDF.

== Reception ==
Appelcline wrote that "Newer players appreciated the unique setting, but older players (who had enjoyed Dark Sun in its AD&D 2e days) were put off by numerous small details that were wrong. [...] Many players found the encounters in Marauders of the Dune Sea to be badly balanced, so that they could easily overpower players. This appears to be an unfortunate side-effect of Marauders of the Dune Sea being published right when 4e was redoing its math for monsters. Marauders of the Dune Sea freely mixes critters from before and after the math changed in Monster Manual 3 (2010), and the result is sometimes off-kilter".
