= Slave Tribes =

Dungeons & Dragons adventure module

- Genre: Role-playing games
- Publisher: TSR
- Publication date: 1992

Slave Tribes is an accessory for the 2nd edition of the Advanced Dungeons & Dragons fantasy role-playing game, published in 1992.

== Contents ==
Slave Tribes is a supplement which details the desert-dwelling tribes of freed slaves, as well as slaves still living in the city-states.

== Publication history ==
Slave Tribes was published by TSR, Inc. in 1992.

== Reception ==
Berin Kinsman reviewed Slave Tribes in the March/April 1993 issue of White Wolf Magazine, and stated that "The entire concept draws a finer line between good and evil than most subject matter in fantasy RPGs (even otherwise good characters can own slaves), and exploring that fine line is one of the strong points of the Dark Sun setting."

== Reviews ==
- Casus Belli #80
