= Arcane Shadows =

- Code: DSQ2
- Authors: Bill Slavicsek
- First published: 1992

Arcane Shadows is an adventure for the 2nd edition of the Advanced Dungeons & Dragons fantasy role-playing game, and released in 1992. The module was written by Bill Slavicsek and published by TSR, Inc.

== Contents ==
The adventure's packaging is similar to "previous Dark Sun modules". It provides useful reference materials for the dungeon master, to include a non-player character table, and extensive maps. It also contains a short work of fiction for context as well as comparatively good artwork related to earlier modules.

The contents of the module are as follows:

Arcane Shadows places four to six 5th to 8th level characters in the City-State of Urik. In this installment, Tyr has been overthrown, and the armies of Urik have been turned back. The characters receive a summons from the Veiled Alliance, and are pursued across the desert by templars. During their flight, they receive aid from a legendary slave tribe, encounter a lost valley, and try to help the Veiled Alliance finish a ceremony that may set Athas on the path of rebirth.

== Publication history ==
Arcane Shadows was preceded by the modules Freedom and Road to Urik, and complements the Prism Pentad works.

== Reception ==
Berin Kinsman reviewed Arcane Shadows in the March/April 1993 issue of White Wolf Magazine, assessing it as an "above-par AD&D module" that "still doesn't quite justify the cost", and rating it a 3 out of 5. He noted that the additional $3–4 for Dark Sun modules at the time appeared to only pay for "fancy packaging" versus content. However, Kinsman stated that "Serious [Dark Sun] fans might find this worth a read even if they don't intend to run it."
