= The Plucker =

2005 novel by Gerald Brom

- Author: Brom
- Illustrator: Brom
- Cover artist: Brom
- Publisher: Abrams
- Publication date: 2005
- Media type: Print ()
- ISBN: 978-0-8109-5792-3
- OCLC: 55886352
- Dewey Decimal: 813/.6 22
- LC Class: PS3602.R6426 P58 2005

The Plucker is a 160 page novel both written and illustrated by Brom. There are three parts to the story, in 22 chapters, and over 100 illustrations in full color.

This story takes place in the shadowy land of make-believe, where Jack and his box are stuck beneath the bed with the other castaway toys. When Plucker, a malevolent spirit, is set loose upon the world of make-believe, Jack is thrust into the unlikely role of defending Thomas, the very child who abandoned him.

== Adaptations ==
=== The Movie ===
Channing Tatum brought the book to producers over at New Line Cinema. The movie was slated for a 2010 release date. However, in early 2008 Warner Bros. absorbed New Line Cinema, and all progress seems to have stopped on the picture.

=== The Plucker on stage ===
There were rumors that a student organization at the University of Hawaiʻi was adapting the book for a stage play. This was confirmed by a YouTube video. The Plucker opened on Valentine's weekend 2009 for one weekend only. The production was directed by Tristan Mathers and starred Aya Itoh (Jack), Hillary Low (Angel), Luke Koehn (The Plucker) and Tristan Lee (Thomas). The production was attended by the author and his family. Another stage adaptation was performed at Rowlett High School, directed by Brandon Tijerina and Travis Ross, starring Ismael Vallejo (Jack), Meghan Riley (Angel), and Zack Taylor (The Plucker).
