= List of Dark Sun novels =

This is a list of the published novels set in the fantasy world of Dark Sun, which was originally a campaign setting for the role-playing game Dungeons & Dragons. Please refer to the main Dark Sun article for further information.

- Prism Pentad – Troy Denning
  1. The Verdant Passage (October 1991), (ISBN 1-56076-121-0)
  2. The Crimson Legion (April 1992), (ISBN 1-56076-260-8)
  3. The Amber Enchantress (October 1992), (ISBN 1-56076-236-5)
  4. The Obsidian Oracle (June 1993), (ISBN 1-56076-603-4)
  5. The Cerulean Storm (September 1993), (ISBN 1-56076-642-5)
- Tribe of One – Simon Hawke
  1. The Outcast (November 1993), (ISBN 1-56076-676-X)
  2. The Seeker (April 1994), (ISBN 1-56076-701-4)
  3. The Nomad (October 1994), (ISBN 1-56076-702-2)
- Chronicles of Athas – Various Authors
  1. The Brazen Gambit (July 1994), by Lynn Abbey (ISBN 1-56076-872-X)
  2. The Darkness Before the Dawn (February 1995), by Ryan Hughes (ISBN 0-7869-0104-7)
  3. The Broken Blade (May 1995), by Simon Hawke (ISBN 0-7869-0137-3)
  4. Cinnabar Shadows (July 1995), by Lynn Abbey (ISBN 0-7869-0181-0)
  5. The Rise & Fall of a Dragon King (April 1996), by Lynn Abbey (ISBN 0-7869-0476-3)
- New Fiction (2010/11) – Various Authors
  1. City Under the Sand (October 2010), by Jeff Mariotte (ISBN 978-0-7869-5623-4)
  2. Under the Crimson Sun (June 2011), by Keith R.A. DeCandido (ISBN 978-0-7869-5797-2)
  3. Death Mark (December 2011), by Robert J. Schwalb (ISBN 978-0786958405)
