= Dark Sun Campaign Setting, Expanded and Revised =

Role-playing game accessory

- Author: Bill Slavicsek
- Genre: Role-playing games
- Publisher: TSR
- Publication date: 1995
- Media type: Boxed set

Dark Sun Campaign Setting, Expanded and Revised is an accessory for the 2nd edition of the Advanced Dungeons & Dragons fantasy role-playing game, published in 1995.

== Contents ==
This revised campaign set for the Dark Sun setting includes the significant political and physical changes that the world of Athas has undergone in the time since the release of the original Dark Sun Boxed Set. This set expanded the campaign area to eight times its original size. Included in the set are three large, colorful maps which present topographical and geographical information about Athas, one of which is a large-scale cloth map that details the main campaign area.

Also included in the set are a gamemaster's screen and four books: "Mystery of the Ancients" is an adventure for beginning player characters, "The Wanderer's Chronicle" provides a description of the campaign world, and "The Age of Heroes" and "The Way of the Psionicist" are books of rules specific to the setting. "The Way of the Psionicist" reproduces the psionics rules from Player's Option: Skills & Powers.

The time period of the campaign begins not long after a number of sorcerer kings were deposed.

- 1 large canvas foldout map
- 2 paper foldout maps
- 1 dungeon master screen
- 1 32-page book Mystery of the Ancients
- 1 96-page book The age of heroes
- 1 32-page book The Way of the Psionics
- 1 128-page book The wanderer's Chronicle

== Publication history ==
Dark Sun Campaign Setting, Expanded and Revised was published by TSR, Inc. in 1995.

== Reception ==
Cliff Ramshaw reviewed the revised edition of Dark Sun for Arcane magazine, rating it a 7 out of 10 overall. He felt that the changes to the psionics rules made for "a much more logical set-up than was previously in use. It's a matter of taste, though, as to whether you think there's any need for spell-like psionic powers when the game already supports such a wide variety of magical styles. He commented that there is "plenty of atmosphere in Dark Sun and, despite the seeming uniformity of the geography, a great deal of imagination has gone into detailing the various regions". He considered the adventure to be "somewhat lacklustre" as it is "short and extremely linear, leaving players with little chance to alter the outcome". Ramshaw concluded the review by saying: "All the same, if blood in the sand is the bag you're into, you'll find plenty to enjoy under the Dark Sun."
