= Dark Sun Boxed Set =

AD&D accessory introducing Dark Sun campaign

- Genre: Role-playing games
- Publisher: TSR
- Publication date: 1991
- Media type: Boxed set

The original Dark Sun Boxed Set is an accessory for the 2nd edition of the Advanced Dungeons & Dragons fantasy role-playing game, published in 1991. It introduces the Dark Sun campaign setting for the game.

== Contents ==
The package includes two thick campaign guides, a booklet titled A Little Knowledge (featuring a short story and a couple of Monstrous Compendium entries), a pair of colorful maps, and a set of spiral-bound flip books featuring an introductory adventure. One of the campaign guides, called The Wanderer's Journal, explains the background of the Dark Sun world and is written in the style of a first-person memoir. The other campaign guide details the new rules for the setting. The flip books are made of cardstock pages bound by metal spirals, and the back covers have accordion folds so that the books can stand upright on a table. The Dungeon Master's Book details a simple adventure, complete with encounter descriptions, game statistics, and role-playing notes. The Player Aid Cards contain pictures and diagrams to be shown to the players during key points of the adventure.

Athas has been devastated as the result of magic run amok, leaving most of Athas as an empty desert, interrupted by a handful of corrupt city states controlled by power-mad sorcerer-kings and their spell-wielding lackeys. Slavery is commonplace, gladiatorial duels provide entertainment for the elite, and treachery and death permeate the culture. As rain falls only once per decade in some areas, water is more precious than gold. Travelers risk dehydration from the scorching heat, ambushes from brutal elven raiders, and attacks from giant tentacles lurking in the dust-filled Sea of Silt. Owing to the scarcity of natural resources, few wizards have access to books made of paper pages and hard covers; instead, they record their spells with string patterns and complex knots. Metal is also rare, affecting both the economy and the quality of equipment. The ceramic coin, made from clay and glazed in various colors, is the primary medium of exchange, worth about a hundredth of a gold piece. Weapons typically consist of obsidian, bone, and wood, and are prone to break. Only a single dragon exists in all of Athas, a monstrosity with supra-genius intelligence whose appearance heralds disasters of catastrophic proportions.

Dark Sun characters are considerably tougher than their counterparts in other AD&D settings. All characters begin at 3rd level, and ability scores may be raised higher than those of ordinary AD&D characters. PCs start the game with three times the funds stated in the "Money and Equipment" chapter of the Player's Handbook. All Dark Sun campaign PCs have at least one psionic talent, as described in The Complete Psionics Handbook. Athasian dwarves stand less than 5' tall and weigh nearly 200 lbs. Each dwarf pursues a singular obsession, called a focus, that requires at least a week to complete. Athasian elves are hostile nomads, marked by savage dispositions and a deep distrust of outsiders. The wiry halflings seldom exceed 3½' in height and live in shaman-ruled settlements in the jungles beyond the mysterious Ringing Mountains. Three new races also flourish in Athas: muls (the exceptionally strong offspring of dwarves and humans, commonly used for slave labor), half-giants (a cross between giants and humans who choose new alignments every morning), and thri-kreen (savage insect men, also known as mantis warriors, with venomous saliva and armorlike exoskeletons). Player-characters may be drawn from any of the races, including the three new ones. For character classes, the warrior category incorporates fighters and the rangers, but excludes paladins, who do not exist in Athas. The warrior class also includes a new archetype called the gladiator. Disciplined in a variety of combat techniques, gladiators are automatically proficient in all weapons, receive a bonuses to punching and wrestling attack rolls, and are allowed to specialize in multiple weapons. Thieves and bards are also included. Priests comprise three distinct categories: clerics, who derive their powers directly from the elemental planes; templars, who serve the sorcerer-kings and are dependent on them for magical energy; and druids, who are bound to the essence of a particular oasis or other geographic location. Dark Sun world wizards include defilers, whose powers come at the expense of the ecosystem; preservers, who wield magic in concert with the environment; and illusionists, specialists in illusory effects who may be either defilers or preservers. The Dark Sun rules encourage players to follow the alignment guidelines used in other AD&D campaigns, though allowances are made for extreme circumstances.

No deities exist in Athas. Instead, clerics worship natural forces, represented by the elemental planes of earth, air, fire, and water. The only spheres accessible to Athasian clerics are those corresponding to the elemental planes, along with the catch-all Sphere of the Cosmos. Additionally, clerics and druids may tap into magical plants called trees of life once per day, to gain heal, augury, divination, and magic font spells. Wizardly magic derives directly from the life forces inherent in the ecosystem. Defilers have no qualms about exploiting the environment, as every spell they cast sucks the life from the surrounding area and turns it into a sterile wasteland. The "Defiler Magical Destruction Table" indicates the effects of defiler magic on the immediate terrain. Preservers, striving to wield magic in harmony with nature, cause no damage to the environment when they cast spells. However, preservers advance in level at a much slower rate than the self-serving defilers.

== Publication history ==
The Dark Sun boxed set was published by TSR, Inc. as a boxed set with a 96-page "Rules Book", a 96-page "Wanderer's Journal", a 16-page "A Little Knowledge" booklet, two 24-page spiral-bound flip books, one single-sided 21" × 32" map sheet, one 21" × 36" double-sided map sheet, and one 21" × 32" poster. Design was by Timothy B. Brown and Troy Denning with editing by William W. Connors and J. Robert King, and black-and-white art by Brom and Tom Baxa, and color art by Brom.

== Reception ==
Berin Kinsman reviewed the set in the February 1992 issue of White Wolf magazine. He rated the product as a 4 out of a possible 5. He stated that it provided good value for the cost and "For those veteran gamers looking for a challenge, or anyone looking for something different, Dark Sun is worth checking out."

Rick Swan reviewed the Dark Sun Boxed Set in the September 1992 issue of Dragon magazine. He gives an overview of the set: "Using the desert as a metaphor for struggle and despair, this set presents a truly alien setting, bizarre even by AD&D game standards. From dragons to spell-casting, from character classes to gold pieces, this set ties familiar AD&D conventions into knots, resulting in one of the most fascinating and original game worlds that TSR has ever produced." He said that the campaign guides are "well-written, clearly organized, and liberally illustrated with evocative black-and-white artwork".
