= Avengers in Lankhmar =

- Campaign setting: Lankhmar

Avengers in Lankhmar is an adventure for the 2nd edition of the Advanced Dungeons & Dragons fantasy role-playing game.

== Plot summary ==
Avengers in Lankhmar is an adventure in which the player characters, and three competitor teams of non-player characters, search the city of Lankhmar for the fugitive assassin Elad Edals, using a timeline of events provided with the adventure that can be cross-referenced against street maps. The rogue has set traps for his pursuers, which the characters must contend with. The path and location of Edals at any time is fixed based on the timeline, but the characters can explore the city for clues or involve themselves in activities in Lankhmar. The adventure outlines specific events that will occur if the characters locate Edals or the other search teams, but all other events are left to random chance and the decision of the Dungeon Master.

== Publication history ==
Avengers in Lankhmar was published by TSR, Inc. in 1995.

== Reception ==
Trenton Webb reviewed Avengers in Lankhmar for Arcane magazine, rating it a 9 out of 10 overall. He compared the adventure to the chase between the characters played by Tommy Lee Jones and Harrison Ford in The Fugitive. He cautioned that running an open system as found in Avengers of Lankhmar would be "fraught with danger, as even parties who have found all the clues can easily miss the finale. It's a risk worth taking, though, to experience Avenger's interwoven mini-scenarios running simultaneously." He also commented on Lankhmar itself, noting that it "offers a quality cast of extras and, since everybody in Lankhmar knows a secret, is plotting something and has a deadly enemy, there is a ring of authenticity to the hubbub of suspicious whisperings that make the scenario a success". He considered Edals the "star" of the adventure: "His traps range from killjoying through plain annoying to the inspired, so characters never know if opening the next door will trigger a fireball or cause manure or some love potioned citizen to fall on them." Webb concluded his review by saying: "With strong characters and combat, Avengers is a hectic and often confusing chase. The referee will be hard-pushed to keep track of who's where and who's doing what at which time, but then he knew the risks when he took the job. For players it's a refreshingly open scenario that is great fun to explore."

== Reviews ==
- Dragon #227
