= Gerald Brom =

American artist (born 1965)

- Born: March 9, 1965 (age 61); Albany, Georgia, U.S.
- Other name: Brom
- Known for: Fantasy art, illustration
- Website: bromart.com

Gerald Brom (born March 9, 1965), known professionally as Brom, is an American gothic fantasy artist, illustrator, and author known for his work in role-playing games, novels, and comics.

== Early life ==
Brom was born March 9, 1965, in Albany, Georgia. As the son of a U.S. Army pilot he spent much of his early years on the move, living in other countries such as Japan and Germany (he graduated from Frankfurt American High School), and in U.S. states including Alabama and Hawaii. Brought up as a military dependent he was known by his last name only, and now signs his name as simply Brom: "I get that asked more than just about any other question. It's my real name, my last name. I got called Brom all the time as a kid, and it just stuck."

Brom has been drawing and painting since childhood, although he had never taken any formal art classes. "I wouldn't exactly call myself self-taught, because I've always looked at the work of other artists and emulated what I liked about it. So you can say they taught me." Brom cites the work of Frank Frazetta, N.C. Wyeth, and Norman Rockwell as influences on his style: "Okay... Rockwell isn't the kind of inspiration most people expect from me, but he just painted things so well. To me it's not so much the genre but the way it's done, and you have to admire his technique."

== Career ==
At the age of 20, Brom started working full-time as a commercial illustrator. By age twenty-one, he had two national art representatives, and was doing work for such clients as Coca-Cola, IBM, CNN, and Columbia Pictures. TSR, Inc. hired Brom on full-time in 1989 at the age of 24. Brom contributed to all of TSR's game and book lines, particularly the Dark Sun setting: "I pretty much designed the look and feel of the Dark Sun campaign. I was doing paintings before they were even writing about the setting. I'd do a painting or a sketch, and the designers wrote those characters and ideas into the story. I was very involved in the development process. I've been fortunate to be involved in the development end of a lot of projects I've worked on, from role-playing games to computer games." According to Shannon Appelcline, Brom "contributed the unique illustrations for Dark Sun that helped to set it apart from the other TSR games with their more typical fantasy drawings". His paintings have been published in collectible card games such as Wizards of the Coast's Magic: The Gathering and Last Unicorn Games' Heresy: Kingdom Come. Brom's paintings, along with Frank Frazetta's, were used in the development of the visual look of the game series Warlords.

In 1993, after four years at TSR, Brom returned to the freelance market, still specializing in the darker side of the roleplaying game, card game, and comic book genres. Shane Lacy Hensley came up with the idea for the game Deadlands after he saw Brom's cover to Necropolis: Atlanta from White Wolf, and got Brom to do the cover for the initial release. His artwork also appeared on book covers from authors such as Michael Moorcock, Anne McCaffrey, and Terry Brooks. Brom contributed conceptual work to computer games such as Heretic II, and several top creature houses for films such as Stan Winston Studios; he also co-created, art directed, and illustrated the Dark Age collectible card game. He has since worked as a movie concept artist, and created illustrations for comics (by DC, Chaos, Dark Horse) and computer games (for id Software, Blizzard, Sega and Activision). Brom has also been active with a line of Brom fetish toys from Fewture and a series of bronzes from the Franklin Mint and paintings for novels (by Michael Moorcock, Terry Brooks, R.A. Salvatore, Edgar Rice Burroughs).

Brom returned to TSR in 1998, doing paintings for the Alternity game, the AD&D role-playing game and its Forgotten Realms and Planescape lines, and covers for Dragon and Dungeon magazines. His work is included in the book Masters of Dragonlance Art. He has also returned to painting for book covers for TSR's successor Wizards of the Coast, including the covers for the War of the Spider Queen series and reprints of The Avatar Series.

== Reception ==
In 2014, Scott Taylor of Black Gate, named Brom as #4 in a list of The Top 10 RPG Artists of the Past 40 Years, saying "Brom is arguably one of the greatest pure fantasy talents of his generation, and he still creates works just as sublime as he did in his 1990s glory."

In 2019, Brom entered the Origins Award Hall of Fame.

In his 2023 book Monsters, Aliens, and Holes in the Ground, RPG historian Stu Horvath reviewed the fantasy role-playing game Dark Sun and noted, "The art of fantasy illustrators Gerald Brom and Tom Baxa tie together this aesthetic-first high concept ... the art of Brom and Baxa distills and transmits the themes of the setting without players having to read a single word of the boxed set. ... Brom's paintings, many of which were composed before the details of the setting were decided, evoke an alien landscape that seems dry, harsh, and strangely sexy."

== Works ==
=== Books ===
- Brom's Little Black Book
- Offerings
- Darkwerks: The Art of Brom (2000)
- The Plucker (2005)
- Metamorphosis (2007) (beinArt) ISBN 978-0-9803231-0-8
- The Devil's Rose (2007)
- The Child Thief (2009)
- Krampus the Yule Lord (2012)
- The Art of Brom (2013) (Flesk) ISBN 978-1-933865-50-8
- Lost Gods (2016)
- Slewfoot (2021)
- Evil in Me (2024)

=== Novel covers ===
- War of the Spider Queen: Dissolution (2003)
- War of the Spider Queen: Insurrection (2003)
- War of the Spider Queen: Condemnation (2004)
- War of the Spider Queen: Extinction (2005)
- War of the Spider Queen: Annihilation (2005)
- War of the Spider Queen: Resurrection (2005)
- "...and Their Memory Was a Bitter Tree..." (2008)

=== Movies (as concept artist) ===
- Galaxy Quest (1999)
- Sleepy Hollow (1999) (poster art)
- Bless the Child (2000)
- Ghosts of Mars (2001)
- The Time Machine (2002) (uncredited)
- Scooby-Doo (2002)
- Van Helsing (2004)

=== Video game covers ===
- Dark Sun: Shattered Lands (1993)
- Dungeons & Dragons: Tower of Doom (1994)
- Dark Sun: Wake of the Ravager (1994)
- Doom II: Hell on Earth (1994)
- Heretic (1994)
- Skyborg: Into the Vortex (1995)
- Dungeons & Dragons: Shadow over Mystara (1996)
- Dark Sun Online: Crimson Sands (1996)
- MageSlayer (1997)
- Heretic II (1998)
- Diablo II (2000)
- Pool of Radiance: Ruins of Myth Drannor (2001)
- World of Warcraft (2004)
- Vanguard: Saga of Heroes (2007) (concept artist)
- Diablo III (2012)
- Hearthstone (2014)
- Diablo IV (2023)

=== Tabletop games ===
- Button Men:Brom (a series of 12 buttons for the Cheapass Games collectible game)
- Dark Age (concept artist)
- Deadlands, 1st edition (cover artist)
- GURPS Magic Items 3 (cover artist)
- Magic: The Gathering (concept artist)
- Nightbane (cover artist)
- South America: Rifts World Book Six (cover & internal artist)
- Conan: Adventures in an Age Undreamed Of, (cover & internal artist)
