= Dark Sun =

Dungeons & Dragons fictional campaign setting

- Designers: Timothy B. Brown; Troy Denning
- Publishers: TSR, Inc. Wizards of the Coast
- Publication: October 1991 (2nd Edition); August 2010 (4th Edition); 2027 (5.5 Edition)
- Genres: Post-apocalyptic sword and sorcery
- Systems: AD&D 2nd Edition; D&D 4th Edition; D&D 5.5 Edition
- Media type: Game accessories, novels, comics, role-playing video games
- Website: 5.5e website

Dark Sun is an original Dungeons & Dragons (D&D) campaign setting set in the fictional, post-apocalyptic desert world of Athas. Dark Sun featured an innovative metaplot, influential artwork, dark themes, and a genre-bending take on traditional fantasy role-playing. The product line began with the original Dark Sun Boxed Set released for D&D's 2nd edition in 1991, originally ran until 1996, and was one of TSR's most successful releases.

Dark Sun deviated from the feudalistic backdrops of its Tolkienesque pseudo-medieval contemporaries, such as Greyhawk or Forgotten Realms, in favor of a composite of dark fantasy, planetary romance, and the Dying Earth subgenre. Dark Sun's designers presented a savage, magic-ravaged desert world where resources are scarce and survival is a daily struggle. The traditional fantasy races and character classes were altered or omitted to better suit the setting's darker themes. Dark Sun differs further in that the game has no deities, arcane magic is reviled for causing the planet's current ecological fragility, and psionics are extremely common. The artwork of Brom established a trend of game products produced under the direction of a single artist. The setting was also the first TSR setting to come with an established metaplot out of the box.

Dark Sun's popularity endured long after the setting was no longer supported, with an online community developing around it. Only third-party material was produced for the third edition D&D rules, but a new official edition of Dark Sun was released in 2010 for the fourth edition. During the fifth edition, Dark Sun was mentioned by developers and psionics appeared in playtest materials. However, game publisher Wizards of the Coast initially chose not to reissue Dark Sun due to the setting's controversial content such as slavery, genocide and racial depictions. At Gen Con 2026, Wizards of the Coast announced a new official version for Dungeons & Dragons 5.5e, scheduled for release in 2027.

== Creative origins ==
TSR released the second edition of Battlesystem, its mass-combat ruleset, in 1989. In 1990 the company began pre-production on a new campaign setting that would use this ruleset, the working title of which was "War World". The team envisioned a post-apocalyptic world full of exotic monsters and no hallmark fantasy creatures whatsoever. TSR worried about this concept, wondering how to market a product that lacked any familiar elements. Eventually, elves, dwarves, and dragons returned but in warped variations of their standard AD&D counterparts. The designers credited this reversion as a pivotal change that launched the project in a new direction.

Contributors to this project at its beginnings included Rich Baker, Gerald Brom, Tim Brown, Troy Denning, Mary Kirchoff, James Lowder, and Steve Winter. With the exception of Denning and Kirchoff, design veterans such as David "Zeb" Cook declined to join the conceptual team (though Cook would write the first two adventure modules: Freedom and Road to Urik). The majority of project members were new to TSR, though not necessarily to the industry (Winter having worked at GDW).

Steve Winter suggested the idea of a desert landscape. His inspiration drew partly from Den by Richard Corben and the fiction of Clark Ashton Smith. The Dark Sun setting drew much of its makeup from artist Brom's imagery: "I pretty much designed the look and feel of the Dark Sun campaign. I was doing paintings before they were even writing about the setting. I'd do a painting or a sketch, and the designers wrote those characters and ideas into the story. I was very involved in the development process".

Game designer Rick Swan described the setting: "Using the desert as a metaphor for struggle and despair, this presents a truly alien setting, bizarre even by AD&D game standards. From dragons to spell-casting, from character classes to gold pieces, this ties familiar AD&D conventions into knots". He said that Athas "shares the post-apocalyptic desolation of FGU's Aftermath game, GDW's Twilight 2000 game, and other after-the-holocaust RPGs".

== Publication history ==
=== 2nd edition Advanced Dungeons & Dragons ===
In 1991, the original Dark Sun Boxed Set, by Timothy B. Brown and Troy Denning, presented the base setting details wherein the Tyr Region is on the verge of revolution against the sorcerer-kings. A five-book fiction series, the Prism Pentad, written by Denning and edited by Lowder, was also released beginning in 1991, in coordination with the boxed set. Following the setting's release, poor sales for Battlesystem soon stopped its further inclusion in Dark Sun products. The tie-in with the Complete Psionics Handbook (1991) proved more successful—all characters and creatures were psionic to a greater or lesser degree—but designers regretted the extra time involved in attaching these rules to practically every living thing in the campaign world.

Dragon Kings, released in 1992, featured rules for epic level character advancement for Dark Sun. Set a decade after the first boxed set, the Expanded And Revised boxed set released in 1995 updated the setting to reconcile the events and characters introduced since the initial 1991 release, and gave more details on the world outside the Tyr Region. It was designed by Bill Slavicsek.

The Dark Sun game line ended abruptly in late 1996. When TSR released its product schedule in Dragon #236 (December 1996) no Dark Sun products were included. The final release was Psionic Artifacts of Athas (1996) though two books, Dregoth Ascending and Secrets of the Dead Lands were rumored to have been near completion to the point that early versions were reportedly given to some GMs at the 1997 Gen Con Game Fair before the line ended. Prior to the line's cancellation, designer Kevin Melka claimed that another halfling product, a book on the dwarves, and a book on the Order were part of his official proposals for 1997. An invasion of the Kreen Empire was also being considered, according to Melka, along with the mystery of the Messenger and a product on the Silt Sea.

=== 3rd edition ===
Dark Sun was not supported with a published rulebook for third edition. However, Paizo Publishing and the fans at Athas.org kept the setting alive through the use of the Open Game License (OGL) issued by Wizards of the Coast. In 2004, Paizo published several articles in Dragon magazine and Dungeon magazine that brought Dark Sun in line with the third edition rules. Athas.org published unrelated source materials in 2007 for Dark Sun under the OGL. Both rules were official versions approved and sanctioned by Wizards of the Coast that provided two different possible versions of the setting.

Additionally, the Sandstorm supplement included rules for general desert conditions.

==== Paizo's Dark Sun ====
David Noonan created an updated version of the setting for Paizo that was published in Dragon magazine and Dungeon magazine that presented rules for 3rd edition. This version took place three hundred years after the last published setting details and sought to return the setting's metaplot to something closer to the original boxed set. This version also provided rules and setting details for the new third edition player character races such as elans and maenads.

A special feature in Dragon magazine #319 (May 2004) and a parallel feature in Dungeon magazine #110 provided an alternative interpretation of the setting for the 3.5 edition (the rules for defiler wizards appear in Dragon #315, and additional monsters in Dungeon #111). Two of the authors of the Paizo materials, Chris Flipse and Jon Sederquist, were on the Athas.org "overcouncil", and were responsible for much of the development of the Athas.org rules.

In place of the higher dice for ability scores, the abilities of all of the player character races have been improved. Each (including humans) has an additional bonus to one or more ability scores, an innate psionic power, and often other bonuses. Every race has a level adjustment, meaning that a PC of the race counts as a PC of higher level than he actually is for purposes of balance.

==== Athas.org ====
Athas.org presented another update to the setting for 3.5 in 2008. It was a rules-only conversion that provided everything needed to play in the Dark Sun world through the non-epic levels. The Athas.org version also condensed the metaplot information and presented a much broader view, allowing players an opportunity to create campaigns in virtually any era of Athas, even as far back as the Blue Age. Athas.org was also given permission to convert and release two unpublished second edition sourcebooks, Dregoth Ascending (2005) and Terrors of the Dead Lands (2005), which was based on TSR's unpublished Secrets of the Deadlands.

=== 4th edition ===
==== Lead up and promotion ====
In 2009, Wizards of the Coast announced the return of Dark Sun as the 2010 campaign setting, in addition a two source books and an adventure for the new campaign setting. The setting was a "reimagining" of the 2nd edition setting, returning to the time immediately after Tyr became a free state. Some of the characters, races, and setting details from the previous editions were changed or removed. A new rules element was the addition of Themes (Athasian Minstrel, Dune Trader, Elemental Priest, etc.). Each PC gained one theme that together with race and class helped define the character. Themes grant an initial power and additional powers could be chosen instead of normally available class powers.

Wizards of the Coast promoted the setting heavily. Rich Baker first communicated various likely changes to the setting via his Wizards of the Coast blog. He also indicated that a preview of Dark Sun would be available as an adventure at the 2010 D&DXP convention. This full adventure previewed new material from the campaign setting.

The fourth Penny Arcade/PvP series of Wizards of the Coast's D&D podcast, running for two weeks in May and June 2010, was devoted to a Dark Sun campaign using pre-generated Dark Sun characters. Throughout July and August, excerpts were published as free content on the D&D Insider website. The first two excerpts covered basic information on the setting, which is similar to that of previous versions. A series of articles continued to provide glimpses into the setting prior to the release in August.

In addition to the first adventure at D&DXP, there were several other adventures provided before the full release:

- The Dark Sun adventure entitled Bloodsand Arena was held on June 19 for Free RPG Day.
- The second season of D&D Encounters (featuring weekly one-to-two-hour adventures at gaming stores) was based in Dark Sun and provided players with 15 weeks of Dark Sun encounters.
- Gen Con and PAX Prime held the "Glory and Blood" Dark Sun Arenas, featuring seven separate arena encounters held in each city-state. Each arena was of varying difficulty and players gathered glory. Winning six of seven adventures resulted in sufficient glory for a cloth map of the Tyr region, not currently available through other means.
- The Lost Cistern of Aravek for fourth-level pregenerated PCs was provided on August 21 for the Worldwide D&D Gameday.

==== Release and Ashes of Athas campaign ====
On August 17, 2010, Wizards of the Coast released three Dark Sun sourcebooks for the fourth edition of D&D: Dark Sun Campaign Setting,, Marauders of the Dune Sea, and Dark Sun Creature Catalog. Preceding this, a Dark Sun themed Dungeon Tiles set was released in June 2010.

In January 2011, at the D&D Experience Convention, Wizards of the Coast and Baldman Games launched an organized play campaign set in Dark Sun. The campaign used the 4th edition rules and time frame. PCs played the role of Veiled Alliance members fighting against a secret organization named The True. Later adventures took players from Altaruk and Tyr across the Tablelands (Urik, Gulg, Nibenay, and many wilderness locations) to confront an ancient primordial evil awakening in the Sea of Silt. Chapters consisting of three linked adventures each were released at the D&DXP, Origins, and Gen Con gaming conventions. A total of seven chapters (21 rounds of four-hour play) were released, providing a single continuous story taking player characters from 3rd through 9th level (11th level at completion). Though the campaign concluded in January 2013 at Winter Fantasy, adventures can be requested from Baldman Games.

==== Version differences ====
The setting was chosen because designer James Wyatt felt that the setting's grittier, action oriented feel was a good fit for the 4th Edition rules and because the setting demonstrated that Dungeons & Dragons games could go beyond the tropes and themes of standard medieval fantasy. This version was heralded as a return of the feel of the original 1991 boxed set taking the setting back before the events of the Prism Pentad. The metaplot's timeline is set back to just after the original Dark Sun's first adventure, Freedom (1991). The sorcerer-king Kalak is dead and Tyr is a free city-state but the future of Athas beyond that is up to the players. Game designer Richard Baker said the design team wanted the game to begin when Athas had the most possibilities for adventure and offer a version of the setting where the Prism Pentad storyline would be possible but not mandatory.

The fourth edition setting strayed far less from the core rules than its AD&D counterpart. Rich Baker reported that the design team wanted the campaign setting to mesh closely with the new core rules and source material, such as the Player's Handbook, than previous editions had. Effort was made, however, to ensure that these more generic elements stayed true to the unique feel of the setting.

The most notable fourth edition change expanded character building by introducing themes. Themes were a third way to define a player character identity through archetypes or careers allowing them to more clearly describe their place or role within the world. Some variant classes central to the previous editions, such as gladiators, templars, and elemental priests, were introduced as themes. Themes proved very popular and were widely adopted in other settings. The scale of Athas was reduced slightly but the geography was largely unchanged.

The edition change created other notable differences including templars as warlocks, the dray becoming dragonborn, the introduction of new core races such as tieflings and eladrin, and the exclusion of races from previous editions: elans, maenads, pterrans, and aarakocra. The new fourth edition races were given Athasian twists in a similar manner to the original fantasy races.

Possibly the most significant change to the setting was the alteration to its cosmology. In previous editions, Athas had a setting specific cosmology that was isolated from the rest of the D&D universe, making it nearly impossible to access via other planes or spacelanes. Fourth edition instead presented Athas squarely within the standard D&D cosmology, though it was still difficult to access or exit.

=== 5th Edition ===
Dark Sun and Athas have been mentioned by developers of the 5th Edition of Dungeons & Dragons. At Gary Con in 2018, co-lead edition designer Mike Mearls mentioned that there was talk about bringing back the Mystic class, a psionic class featured in a playtest article released in the Unearthed Arcana series. Mearls noted that, at the time, Wizards of the Coast decided not to release the Mystic on its own because the class would not be needed "until we do Dark Sun". Dark Sun was also mentioned in a revised version of the psionics rules released in an Unearthed Arcana article. In 2023, Dungeons & Dragons executive producer Kyle Brink stated that "the Dark Sun setting is problematic in a lot of ways, and that's the main reason we haven't come back to it", but acknowledged that the setting has "a huge fan following". Mollie Russell of Wargamer explained that "sensitive topics like genocide are ingrained in the setting", "slavery is commonplace", and multiple races "potentially perpetuate harmful stereotypes".

==== 5.5e release and Season of Survival ====
In March 2026, Wizards of the Coast announced a new seasonal content format for Dungeons & Dragons. At Gen Con, in July 2026, Wizards of the Coast announced that the upcoming Season of Survival will feature the Dark Sun release for Dungeons & Dragons 5.5e. This update will include two sourcebooks scheduled to be published in 2027: the Dark Sun: Blood and Power gameplay expansion and the Dark Sun: Edge of Oblivion adventure expansion. The teaser trailer included an "abundance of gore, eviscerations, and ultra-violence". Dark Sun was announced as their first mature (18+) rated setting with its books to be shrink-wrapped. Russell commented that while Wizards of the Coast previously labeled the setting as problematic, "sentiments at the executive level have changed". Jody Macgregor of PC Gamer highlighted the demands of a Dark Sun revival, noting that the "rumor mill [kept] churning" with various psion class playtests. He wrote "Wizards of the Coast finally pressed the big red button that said 'dark fantasy nostalgia for '90s kids' and announced its return".

== Reception ==
A reviewer for the British magazine Arcane commented: "There's plenty of atmosphere in Dark Sun and, despite the seeming uniformity of the geography, a great deal of imagination has gone into detailing its various regions". The reviewer also observed: "Life on Athas is particularly tough and short. Never mind the monsters; failing to take enough water on a desert crossing can be fatal". The reviewer concluded that "if blood in the sand is the bag you're into, you'll find plenty to enjoy under the Dark Sun". Writing in Dragon magazine, Rick Swan gave the initial release 4.5 stars out of five. He warned that it would take "a skilled DM to handle the subtleties of the setting, not to mention the psionics rules and the fine points of the new races and character classes, but it is worth the effort. The Dark Sun setting is that good".

The original Dark Sun product line was one of TSR's most popular releases in the 1990s with an enduring fan following. In the 1990s, fans formed multiple mailing lists, fan sites, and discussion boards concerning the setting. These fan sites grew to such a size and scale during the 1990s that TSR filed legal paper work against them for infringing on their copyright. TSR eventually relented after fan outcry and established a formal fan site dedicated to Dark Sun fan creations.

Reviewers of the fourth edition release of the setting were largely favorable. Christopher W. Richeson of RPG.net gave the setting an excellent rating, saying that update did an "excellent job of incorporating 4E's mythology without losing the harsh feel of the original setting". EN World gave the setting a B+ rating saying that the source book was readable, and introduced innovative new mechanics to the game. The reviewer was critical of the source book, feeling it to be "incomplete" in both content and artwork in comparison to the Forgotten Realms source books released two years prior.

Looking back at the setting, Chris Wilson writing for Time describes the world as a good candidate for television adaptation, "a richly imagined world" with "traces of Dune mixed with Jedi-like powers and a healthy side of murderous human-sized praying mantises". John Baichtal of Wired described Athas as "the swords and sorcery equivalent of Mad Max: a desert world where water, steel and kindness are in short supply, where magic destroys the environment and the kings and queens are exclusively evil. Elves are untrustworthy merchants and halflings are cannibals. New PC races include muls (half-dwarves) and thri-kreen (insect men) add to the setting's uniqueness. It's a riot!"

In his 2023 book Monsters, Aliens, and Holes in the Ground, RPG historian Stu Horvath noted, "Dark Sun is perhaps TSR's most obviously political product. Coming as it did in 1991, a year after activists brought the 20th anniversary of Earth Day to the international stage with a multi-million-dollar awareness campaign, it is difficult not to read the campaign setting as a grim warning ... 30 years later, Dark Sun still feels relevant as a cautionary fable about unchecked power and a disregard for the environment."

In 2024, Timothy Linward of Wargamer explained that the setting is "what the online discourse calls problematic fiction", noting that "even as Dark Sun is a right-on, pro-environment, tyrant-smashing fantasy, it clumsily reproduces harmful stereotypes, and deploys some of history's worst atrocities as pulp setting material". Linward argued that the "current brand" of Dungeons & Dragons could not "handle a setting which draws so much of its strength from moral horrors and challenging ideas". He opinioned that publisher Wizards of the Coast's recent approach has been to remove or "attempt to hide" the "problematic elements of its games and their fictions" rather than attempting to engage with the material.

== The world ==
The campaign setting of Dark Sun is played on the fictional planet Athas. Novels and source books largely take place in the Tyr Region, though other areas are described for play. The exact landmass configuration of the planet or the existence of other continents is unknown.

Athas is a devastated world, the result of magic run amok. Most of Athas is an empty desert, interrupted by a handful of corrupt city states controlled by power-mad sorcerer-kings and their spell-wielding lackeys. The brutal climate and the oppressive rule of the sorcerer-kings have created a corrupt, bloodthirsty, and desperate culture that leaves little room for chivalric virtues common to fantasy settings (hence why paladins are excluded). Slavery is commonplace, gladiatorial duels provide entertainment for the elite, and death permeates the culture. As rain falls only once per decade in some areas, water is more precious than gold. Due to the scarcity of natural resources, few wizards have access to books made of paper pages and hard covers; instead, they record their spells with string patterns and complex knots. Metal is also rare, affecting both the economy and the quality of equipment. The ceramic coin, made from clay and glazed in various colors, is the primary medium of exchange, worth about a hundredth of a gold piece. Due to a scarcity of metal, weapons and armor are made from natural materials such as bone, stone, wood, carapace or obsidian, and are prone to breaking. Only a single dragon exists in all of Athas, a monstrosity whose appearance heralds disasters of catastrophic proportions.

Arcane magic draws its power from the life force of plants or living creatures, with the potential to cause tremendous harm to the environment. As a result, wizards and other arcane casters are despised and must practice in secret. Psionics are extremely common with nearly every living thing having at least a modicum of psionic ability.

Athas has no deities and no formal religions other than the cults created by the sorcerer-kings. There is some contention within the source material as to whether or not there were ever deities in the setting. The AD&D source material seems to suggest that there weren't ever any gods involved with Athas, while the 4th edition setting leaves the option open, more explicitly stating that the gods were destroyed or driven away by malevolent elemental spirits. Clerics and druids instead draw power from the Inner Planes/Elemental Chaos.

=== History of Athas ===
Dark Sun's extensive metaplot spans several fictional ages into its past and is described by a narrator called the Wanderer who presents an in-game account of Athas's history in their Wanderer's Journal. According to this account the planet progressed through several ages roughly corresponding to the color of the sun and the state of the planet.

==== The Blue Age ====
The Wanderer's Journal begins with the Edenic Blue Age when Athas was once covered with a vast body of life-giving water under a blue sun. Halflings ruled Athas during this time, building a powerful civilization. They were nature-masters and life-shapers, able to produce anything they needed by manipulating the principles of nature itself. The age came to an end by accident. The halflings of the great city of Tyr'agi tried to increase the sea's fecundity in order to produce more creatures and plants. The experiment failed, however, instead choking the sea with a toxic brown tide that spread across the waters, killing everything it touched.

==== The Green Age ====
The Wanderer's Journal claims that the Green Age began approximately 14,000 years before the setting's starting period. Desperate to save themselves and Athas from the brown tide, the halflings built the Pristine Tower, a powerful talisman that could harness the energies of the sun. The light of the Pristine Tower burned away the brown tide but also changed the planet. The sun changed from blue to yellow. The endless sea receded, revealing a verdant world of plant life. The halflings' civilization came to an end and most of them withdrew from the world and spiraled into savagery. The last of the nature-masters transformed themselves into new races, becoming humans, demihumans, and other humanoids that repopulated the world and built new civilizations.

The former halfling center of Tyr'agi was renamed Tyr and the other great cities of the Tyr region, such as Ebe, Bodach and Giustenal, were built during this period. Due to mutations caused by the power of the Pristine Tower, the new people of Athas discovered they were gifted with myriad psionic powers. Soon a high standard of living was achieved for those dwelling in the cities supported by wonders created with psionics.

==== The Time of Magic ====
Among the new races was a rare and powerful race known as the pyreens. One of their number, Rajaat, would bring about sweeping changes to Athas. Rajaat discovered magic eight thousand years before the current age. Seeking more power he took possession of the Pristine Tower. Here he mastered this new force and developed two distinct ways; one that preserved nature, known as preserving, and one that exploited it, known as defiling. He taught preserving magic to the public but secretly selected 15 human students with a potential for both psionics and magic for a darker purpose. Using the power of the Pristine Tower to harness the energy of the yellow sun, he transformed these 15 into his Champions. Besides their native psionic powers and defiling magic, they were imbued with immortality and the ability to draw magical energy from living creatures through the use of obsidian orbs. The process of creating the Champions turned the sun from yellow to red.

==== The Cleansing Wars ====
Rajaat's ultimate desire was to exterminate all races except the halflings and return Athas to the splendor of the Blue Age. About 3,500 years before the current age, Rajaat assigned each of his Champions a race to exterminate and the ensuing years of struggle were known as the Cleansing Wars. The unbridled use of defiling magic unleashed by Rajaat and his Champions during the wars desolated the land, turning much of it into a savage, desert wasteland under a burning crimson sun. The non-existence of many of the typical D&D races, such as trolls and goblins, is due to these wars.

==== The Age of the Sorcerer-Kings ====
The struggles would have continued to completion had the Champions not discovered that Rajaat's true plans did not include their survival. Approximately 2,000 years before the current age, the Champions, led by Borys of Ebe, rebelled against their creator and used one of Rajaat's talismans, the Dark Lens, to imprison him in a shadow realm known as the Black. With Rajaat imprisoned, the former Champions renamed themselves Sorcerer-Kings and despotically divided up the surviving city-states among themselves. His escape would spell doom for all of them, so the former Champions selected Borys as Rajaat's warden. As warden, Borys would need to be transformed into a true dragon, a creature nearly unheard of in the setting, in order to be able to cast the spells required to maintain Rajaat's prison. The ritual that transformed Borys into a dragon caused him to go mad and embark on a century-long defiling rampage. The defiling during the Cleansing War had been substantial, but Borys's rampage was the tipping point that turned Athas into a hellish desert.

==== Metaplot ====
Dark Sun's second edition metaplot was advanced through its novels and adventure modules. During this era TSR began to expand metaplots in other settings, such as Forgotten Realms, but Dark Sun pioneered the matching of fiction and adventure modules to engender and advance metaplots. The original 1991 boxed set begins at the end of the Brown Age (the Age of the Sorcerer-Kings) with the former Champions of Rajaat now tyrannically ruling over the few pockets of civilization left in the Tyr Region. These city-states tightly control the few remaining reservoirs of fresh water, the food supply, and other precious resources such as obsidian or iron.

Troy Denning's Prism Pentad novels brought sweeping changes to the metaplot of Dark Sun and were also closely tied to playable adventure modules such as DS1: Freedom (1991) and DSQ1: Road to Urik (1992). This trend continued with the adventure modules tying directly into Denning's fiction and vice versa. The culmination of the tangled metaplot was summarized in Beyond The Prism Pentad (1995) in preparation for the release of the revised and expanded boxed set, released a few months later, which presented the setting after the events of the modules and novels. Some advances in the metaplot were controversial among fans as releases such as Mind Lords of the Last Sea and Windriders of the Jagged Cliffs explicitly introduced more science fiction elements, such as the lifeshaping magics of the halflings, that had previously only been hinted at.

At the point the source material lays out for play the beginning of the Age of Heroes when the sorcerer-king's hold on the Tyr Region has recently been challenged with the assassination of Kalak of Tyr in a slave rebellion led by Rikus, Agis, Neeva, Tithian, and Sadira. Over the course of the adventure modules and the novels the metaplot advances radically, changing the Tyr Region with Rikus, Agis, Neeva, Tithian, and Sadira (from the novels), or the player characters at the center of the changes. Borys the Dragon is killed by Rikus and Sadira. Sadira becomes the first sun-wizard through the use of the Pristine Tower, putting her at a level of power equal to the sorcerer-kings. Tithian uses the Dark Lens to free Rajaat, believing he will be transformed into a sorcerer-king as a reward. Several sorcerer-kings are lost or destroyed during the ensuing battle with Rajaat. Andropinis is imprisoned in the Black while Tectuktitlay is killed. Rajaat is ultimately vanquished by Sadira using the Dark Lens as a focus for a spell that burns away Rajaat's shadow, the source of his tremendous power. This spell also causes a tremendous earthquake creating the Great Rift, a passage to the previously unknown Crimson Savannah and the alien Kreen Empire.

The Revised and Expanded boxed set released in 1995 begins at this point with the destabilization of the Tyr Region's political power structure. The wake of the creation of the Cerulean Storm and the earthquake that caused the Great Rift results in powerful storms and destructive aftershocks. The Wanderer discovers the lost halflings of the Jagged Cliff, as well as the psionic utopians of the Mind Lords of the Last Sea.

==== Third edition changes ====
===== Paizo =====
In May 2004, David Noonan wrote a brief update for the setting for the 3rd edition rules. The setting picked up three hundred years after the second edition and the events of the Prism Pentad. The guide outlined some of the important events that had taken place since then, and largely focused on the city-states and the fate of the remaining sorcerer-kings.

The city-state of Raam is on the verge of collapse after the death of its sorcerer-queen. The psionic dragon-lich Dregoth, who resurrected himself after being slain by the other Sorcerer-Kings for attempting to become a dragon like Borys, sweeps in and transforms most of the riotous inhabitants into undead. He now rules the city-state where the living walk side by side with undead zombies and skeletons. In Draj, Azetuk the adopted son of the deceased Sorcerer-King Tectuktitlay was installed largely as a figurehead by Tectuktitlay templars, but manages to learn enough to transform himself into a true sorcerer-king. He takes control of Draj and begins to demand regular blood sacrifices in his temples. Balic has also fallen into chaos after the disappearance and reappearance of their sorcerer-king Andropinis.

Tyr remains free from sorcerer-king rule and has managed to defend its walls from multiple assaults from Urik. The city-state is now ruled by a council of nobles and preserver mages from the Veiled Alliance.

===== Athas.org =====
In 2008, Athas.org released a new edition of the Dark Sun campaign setting for the 3.5 rules. This edition picks up the metaplot two years after the Wanderer's discovery of the Last Sea. Following prophesied signs, Dregoth takes to the surface and makes his bid for true divinity.

==== Fourth edition changes ====
The fourth edition setting presents a much abridged and somewhat different backstory that alludes to the original metaplot but doesn't explicitly reference it. Little is known in-game about the history of Athas and what is known is largely myth, legend, and/or the propaganda of the sorcerer-kings. The fourth edition metaplot describes three ages: the Green Age, the Red Age, and the Desert Age or the Age of the Sorcerer-Kings. As with the original metaplot, the Green Age is earliest visible sign of civilization but suggests that rare tales tell of an earlier age, possibly the Blue Age. The end of the Green Age is described similarly to the original metaplot. The Green Age gave way to the more recent Red Age, a time of profound war and strife that left the world a blasted, desolate waste. Game play begins during the Desert Age, similarly to 2nd edition, with the world a barren wasteland and its few remaining habitable places being lorded over by the sorcerer-kings. Sorcerer-king Kalak of Tyr has been assassinated and the liberation of Tyr has sparked a glimmer of hope and renewal in the Tyr Region.

A side-bar briefly describes the true history of Athas, which differs slightly from the original. First, the gods were destroyed or driven away from Athas by malevolent elementals known as primordials. The loss of true gods created a fault in the world that allowed for the potential for arcane magic, which Rajaat discovers; the remainder of the metaplot up to the modern era is similar to 2nd edition. The Tyr Region remains the only bastion of civilization on Athas but is tyrannically ruled by the sorcerer-kings. No mention is made of the events of the Prism Pentad.

=== Cosmology ===
One of the hallmarks of the Dark Sun setting was Athas' cosmological isolation, something that broke with the rest of the canonical Dungeons & Dragon's universe. Many of Dark Sun's AD&D contemporaries are accessible via planar travel or spelljamming, but Athas, with very few exceptions, is entirely cut off from the rest of the universe. While it retains its connections to the Inner Planes, access to the Transitive Planes and Outer Planes is nearly impossible. The reason for the cosmological isolation is never fully explained.

The cosmology for the original setting consists of the prime material plane and two other transitive planes: the Gray and the Black. The Black is roughly equivalent to the Plane of Shadows and contains a mysterious realm of absolute nothingness called the Hollow that serves as a prison for Rajaat. The Gray is roughly equivalent to the Ethereal Plane in that it surrounds Athas, forming a massive buffer between the prime material plane and the Astral Plane and so cutting it off from Outer Planes. The Gray in this edition is the realm of the dead where undead creatures and necromancers draw their power. The Gray, however, is thinner in regards to the Ethereal Plane, bringing access to the Inner Planes with relative ease. Dark Sun's Inner Planes have different paraelementals based on natural phenomena: rain lay between air and water; sun between air and fire; magma between fire and earth; and silt between earth and water.

The 4th edition setting places Athas clearly within the World Axis cosmology, but retains its traditional cosmological isolation. The Feywild, known as the Lands Within the Winds, is largely absent with its few remaining access points being jealously guarded by the remains of the eladrin on Athas. Shadowfell, known as the Gray on Athas, acts as a barrier between Athas and the other planes. The Astral Sea is accessible via the Gray but the realm is largely empty in proximity to Athas with the connections to other realms lost. As with previous editions, Athas sits close to the Elemental Chaos and the planet has a special connection to these planes. These planes are accessible from the World and vice versa. Contained deep within the Elemental Chaos is the Abyss.

=== Races ===
Athas is home to several of the standard high fantasy races, including elves, dwarves, half-elves, halflings, and humans, as well as a handful of new or exotic fictional races, such as muls, half-giants, pterrans, thri-Kreen, and aarakocra. Subsequent resources introduced more races such as elans, drays, and maenads.

Dark Sun races were distinctly different from those found in other campaign settings as the designers purposefully went against type. For example, the thri-kreen and aarakocra were originally monsters. Some of the hallmark fantasy races were each given different twists to make them more suitable to the setting's darker themes. Athasian elves are not benevolent forest dwellers but hostile tribal nomads with savage dispositions and a deep distrust of outsiders. Halfings are largely cannibals living in shaman-ruled settlements in the jungles beyond civilization. Other standard fantasy races such as ogres, kobolds, or trolls, for example, are all assumed to have been destroyed during the Cleansing Wars or simply passed from the world in previous ages.

==== Playable races ====
| Race | Description | Editions as a playable race |
|---|---|---|
| Aarakocra | Intelligent bird-people living in small tribes in the rocky badlands and mountains. Aarakocra were not included as a playable race in 4e but are mentioned as dwelling in the hinterlands of Athas. | 2nd, 3rd |
| Dragonborn (dray) | Created by the sorcerer-king Dregoth in the city-state Giustinal, most were destroyed along with their city-state. They are now a race of refugees living on the fringes of Athasian society. | 2nd, 4th |
| Dwarf | Athasian dwarves are similar to dwarves in other settings but usually have little to no hair, and are gifted artisans of stone and metal. In previous editions dwarves could not practice arcane magic but this restriction was omitted in 4th edition. | All |
| Eladrin | Egotistical, isolationist refugees from the dying Lands Within Winds attempting to save what remains of their decaying homeland. They excel at psionics and abhor arcane magic. Eladrin are not well known on Athas and most regard them as legends. | 4th |
| Elan | Former humans changed into a race of powerful psions. Elans were introduced in the updated setting description in Dragon magazine #319 (May 2004). In Athas, elans were created by the psionic society known as The Order. Elans were included in 4th edition in the supplement Psionic Power. | 3rd, 4th |
| Elf | Athasian elves are swift-running herders, traders, thieves, and raiders and are considered untrustworthy by most other Athasians for their duplicitous ways. Elves in this setting prefer to live in the moment and attempt to avoid hard work or drudgery as much as possible. | All |
| Genasi | Genasi, or half-elementals, are the rare offspring of humans and elementals living in the wastes on the Isle of the Sea of Silt. They revere nature and hate sorcerer-kings and defilers. | 4th |
| Half-elf | Half-elves are the offspring of humans and elves. They are shunned and held with suspicion and hostility from both sides of their parentage. | All |
| Half-giant (Goliath) | Half-giants are magically generated human-giant hybrids created by the sorcerer-kings as slave soldiers. More intelligent than their counterparts in other worlds, but with a tendency to change personalities over time. Half-giants can only mate with other half-giants. | All |
| Halfling | Halflings are the oldest race on Athas with a culture dating back to the distant past. They are now known for being savage (often cannibalistic) tribal people, and revere nature. They largely live in isolated tribes in the jungles. | All |
| Human | Humans are the most populous race on Athas. | All |
| Maenad | Maenad are not native to Athas. Along with the elan they were introduced in the 2004 setting brief in Dragon magazine, brought to Athas as soldiers by the sorcerer-king Andropinus when he returned from the Outer Planes. They were not included in the 4th edition setting. | 3rd only |
| Minotaur | Savage warriors bred by an elemental cult to create half-human half-bull soldiers to fight the sorcerer kings. | 4th |
| Mul | Muls are dwarven-human hybrids bred by the sorcerer-kings as a race of slave soldiers. They are larger and stronger than humans, possessed of tremendous endurance. | All |
| Pterran | Intelligent reptiloids dwelling in the Hinterlands west of the Ringing Mountains. Pterrans have a shamanistic culture and believe themselves to be the planet's chosen children. They were not included in the 4e setting. | 2nd, 3rd |
| Thri-Kreen | Thri-Kreen are a race of predatory, six-limbed, humanoid-sized insect people resembling mantises. | All |
| Tiefling | Tieflings are the offspring of humans and demons who wander the wastes raiding, stealing, and killing for survival. | 4th |

==== Others ====
- Pyreen or peace-bringers are an ancient race of nomadic, psionic druids that mysteriously emerged during the Green Age who opposed Rajaat and the sorcerer-kings, and seek to restore vitality to Athas. They are described in the Terrors of the Desert Monstrous Compendium. The Pyreen display a mix of features of the other races (i.e. a dwarven face, elven legs, etc.), and are a non-player race in previous editions but appear as an epic destiny in the 4th edition setting.
- Hej-kin, described in the Terrors of the Desert Monstrous Compendium.
- Pterran, described in the Terrors of the Desert Monstrous Compendium.
- Vilichi, a variant human, all female, described in the Terrors of the Desert.
- Psurlon, described in Terrors Beyond Tyr.
- Nikaal, described in Terrors Beyond Tyr.
- Tarek, described Terrors Beyond Tyr.
- Tari, rat-men, subject to an unsuccessful genocidal "cleansing" by Kalid-Ma, described in Terrors Beyond Tyr.

=== Classes ===
Similar to the races, Dark Sun's character classes were largely consistent with the classes of the core game rules, but with some changes to bring them in line with the game's unique themes. For example, the commonplace development of psionic ability, unusual nature of magic, and focus on survival skills have altered the scope and theme of some classes and lead the addition of new classes. Bards, for example, are as likely to be skilled at assassination or poisons as they are with entertainment. Athasian clerics, rather than worship a given deity, pact with elementals. They also do not organize into churches, collect followers, and are allowed to carry edged weapons. There are also significant setting distinctions between arcane spellcasters, divine spellcasters, and psionicists that often do not exist in other fantasy worlds. Arcane spell casters are largely reviled, while divine magic is accepted though it sometimes presents an ideological challenge to the sorcerer-king's rule. Psionics are broadly accepted and celebrated, with virtually all living things possessing some psionic talent.

Defilers and Preservers: The Wizards of Athas included information and rules for how 20th level wizards can transform into 21st level dragons, or avangions for good-aligned characters, both of which also have psionic powers. Avangion have been ranked among the strongest creatures in the game by Scott Baird from Screen Rant.

As classes changed in subsequent editions these were also reconciled with the setting. Available classes are not defined in the 4th edition campaign setting. Besides paladins being specifically mentioned as not being present, there is very little information as to whether or not the other 4th editions classes should be included in the setting.

In 3rd edition sorcerers are almost unheard of, though in the Paizo adaptation they suffer an even greater stigma than wizards. Warlocks, sorcerers, and artificers are standard classes available for play in the 4th edition setting. Other arcane spell casters such as sorcerers, and warlocks, or were not included until the Paizo later version of the setting in 2004. In 4th edition any arcane caster was ostensibly available if the dungeon master allowed it.

| Class | Editions as a playable class | Description |
|---|---|---|
| Bard | All | Bards were included in the original AD&D boxed set as part of the rogue class, and again in the 3rd edition rules. Athasian bards differed from their counterparts on other worlds in that they are as likely to deal in poisons, assassination, and blackmail as they are in entertainment or lore. The original Athasian bard. does not have the ability to cast spells. In 4th edition, the Athasian Minstrel is offered as a character theme and it is suggested that many Athasian Minstrels are bards, but a setting-specific bard class is not outlined. |
| Barbarian/Brute | 3rd | Brutes had the same game statistics as the barbarians. |
| Cleric | 2nd, 3rd | There are no gods in Athas so clerics gain their powers by making pacts with elementals (earth, fire, water, air) or paraelemental (sun, silt, magma, rain) of the Inner Planes. In 4th Edition, clerics and other divine classes are not available. |
| Druid | All | Druids gain their powers by serving the natural spirits of Athas. |
| Dune Traders | All | Dune Traders were a new character class specific to the 2nd edition Dark Sun setting, introduced in the separate Dune Trader supplement. They have access to many of the same rogue skills as thieves, but to a lesser extent. In addition, they had several abilities unique to traders, including the cultivation of extensive networks of useful contacts. In 3rd edition they were a prestige class. In the 4th edition setting the dune trader is a character theme. |
| Fighter | All | |
| Gladiator | 2nd | Specialized warriors who fight for entertainment. |
| Psion | All | Psionics are an important part of the setting. Psions and psionic classes of various types were always available depending on the edition. These included: psychic warrior, soulknife, wilder, and potentially other psionic classes included in 4e. |
| Ranger | All | |
| Templar | All | Templars are mystic servants of the sorcerer-kings. In previous editions they were a specialized priest class, but in 4th edition they are a character theme that practices some sort of arcane magic. Many are warlocks. |
| Wizard | All | In previous editions, defilers and preservers were a separate class. In 4th edition, defiling and preserving is a matter of choice. |

==== Divine spellcasters ====
Clerics and other divine spellcasters were particularly affected by the setting; the lack of true gods meant that divine spellcasters were radically different from the standard D&D counterparts. Without proper deities, clerics derive their powers from such as the forces of the Inner Planes, or in 4th edition, the Elemental Chaos. Divine spell casters, such as elemental clerics or druids, are allied to one of these planes and are able to draw energy from them for their specialized spells. The only spheres accessible to Athasian clerics are those corresponding to the elemental planes (earth, air, fire, and water), the paraelemental planes (silt, sun, rain, and magma).

The idea of the divine spell caster changed significantly during the 4th edition of the setting with the introduction of primal magic. Some ostensibly divine spell casters, such as templars, became arcane spell casters. Others, such as shamans, clerics, and druids, cast spells using primal magic as opposed to divine magic. Clerics technically still used divine magic mechanics but under the same limited auspices that marked the previous editions of the setting.

In previous editions, templars, casters who directly serve and derive their powers from the sorcerer-kings, were treated as a specialized form of cleric. In 4th edition the templar class shifted away from being a divine caster to an arcane caster, though not all templars are skilled in magic. Many templars are not clerics at all but warlocks who have pacted with their sorcerer-king. They are entirely dependent on their patrons for their magical abilities. Besides their cleric-like abilities, templars also have special abilities that allow them to govern and control the population of their city-states.

Game designer Rick Swan felt that while "clerics got the shaft in the original Dark Sun set", the supplement Earth, Air, Fire, and Water "transforms the stodgy Dark Sun cleric into the setting's most intriguing character". With the 4th edition setting the elemental cleric became a background rather than a class in and of itself.

==== Arcane spellcasters ====
Arcane magic in Dark Sun differs substantially from more traditional fantasy campaign settings in that it draws from the life force of the planet or living beings. Arcane spellcasters may cast spells in a manner that preserves nature, known as preservers, or in a manner that destroys it, known as defilers. However, any arcane caster may choose to defile at any time. Defiling exploits the environment, draining the life from the surrounding area and turning it into a sterile wasteland.

=== Psionics ===
Psionic powers are a cornerstone of the setting, with nearly every living thing having some psionic abilities. Psionic ability is about as common in Dark Sun as arcane magic is in other D&D campaign settings, and unlike arcane magic, is accepted and revered appearing in every strata of Athasian society.

Given the prevalence of psionics the people of Athas have developed laws to govern their use. Each of the major city-states in the setting have organizations that teach or regulate psionics in that region. Additionally, the Order is a secret psionic organization composed of supremely powerful psions (21st level and above) that sees itself as the secret monitors of psionic balance on Athas. By and large, crimes committed using psionics are punished as they would be if they were committed normally. Mind reading, controlling the actions of others, spying on others using by psionic means are all outlawed, and summoning extraplanar beings are all outlawed. The only exception to these laws is for court officials who are allowed to use psionics in the due process of law.

The original Dark Sun boxed set did not contain rules for psionics, but rather drew on a separate supplement: The Complete Psionics Handbook. These were later expanded in the setting-specific sourcebook The Will And The Way. The Dark Sun Campaign Setting, Expanded and Revised published in 1995 included psionic rules as part of the core boxed set, which were intended to replace The Complete Psionics Handbook rules.

The 3rd and 4th editions of D&D would make psionics more common as an option in any D&D world, and would split the original psionicist character class into a number of different psionics-using classes.

== In other media ==
Numerous novels have been based in the Dark Sun setting. Notable authors writing in the world of Athas are Troy Denning, Simon Hawke, and Lynn Abbey.

IDW Publishing released a five-issue comic limited series, Dark Sun (2011) by writer Alex Irvine and artist Peter Bergting, based on the campaign setting called Ianto's Tomb.

Three video games are also set in the Dark Sun world: Dark Sun: Shattered Lands (1993), Dark Sun: Wake of the Ravager (1994), and the MMORPG Dark Sun Online: Crimson Sands (1996).
