= Birthright (campaign setting) =

Dungeons & Dragons fictional campaign setting

- Designers: Rich Baker and Colin McComb
- Publishers: TSR, Inc. Sierra On-Line
- Publication: 1995
- Genres: Fantasy
- Languages: English
- Systems: Advanced Dungeons & Dragons
- Chance: Dice rolling

Birthright is a Dungeons & Dragons campaign setting that was first released by TSR in 1995. It is based on the continent of Cerilia on the world of Aebrynis, in which the players take on the role of the divinely-empowered rulers, with emphasis on the political rulership level of gameplay. The setting revolves around the concept of bloodlines: divine power gained by heroes and passed on to their descendants. Characters with a bloodline create an aura of command known as Regency, which is measured in the game using regency points or RP. Using regency, characters acquire a domain composed of provinces and holdings. The development of these domains is as much a part of the game as development of the characters. The game uses three-month domain turns to model actions of rulers over nations in much the same way as Dungeons & Dragons uses combat rounds to simulate time to model the characters' actions in battle. In 1996, Birthright won the Origins Award for Best Roleplaying Supplement of 1995.

== Development ==
In 1994, Rich Baker and Colin McComb co-designed the Birthright campaign setting. Matthew Pook for Pyramid magazine recognized the campaign as the first setting to support player characters as rulers, providing players with a game based on "diplomacy, politics, trade, construction and (of course) war". According to writer Michael J. Tresca, Birthright was inspired by Tolkien's Middle-earth setting, as a "universe profoundly influenced by bloodline, nation building, and war", while the game's chroniclers Witwer et al. saw the elements which "let players command the armies of nations" as "a nod back to D&D's wargaming roots."

== Geography ==
The world of Aebrynis has at least four known continents, the frozen continent of Thaele, the continent of Djapar to the southeast, the great southern continent of Aduria, and Cerilia, the location of the actual Birthright campaign. Cerilia itself is divided into five regions, each named after the primary human group that first settled there:

- Anuire is in the southwest portion of Cerilia. The river Maesil forms a great highway through the heartlands. The region has a temperate climate similar to Western Europe. Anuire has no direct historical analogy, but is an amalgam of medieval England, imperial Rome, and Gondor from The Lord of the Rings.
- Rjurik is in the northwest of Cerilia. Large expanses of sparsely settled pine forests dominate this region. The climate and culture are modeled on Scandinavia and the Celts.
- Brechtür is in the central north of Cerilia. The Great Bay almost separates Cerilia in half. The nations of Brechtür lie on the shores of the Great Bay. These realms are very mountainous and travel by ship is almost always preferred to overland routes. Conceptually similar to the Hanseatic League.
- Khinasi is in the southeast of Cerilia and the warmest region of the continent. It has arid plains, rugged mountains, many islands, and deserts. The people are seafarers and less fearful of magic than other areas. It is conceptually similar to Moorish Spain and Arabia.
- Vosgaard is located in the northeast of Cerilia and is also known as the Heartless Wastes. The land is frigid, unforgiving and populated by some of the most dangerous creatures on the continent. The prevailing culture is conceptually similar to the Rus.

== History ==
Cerilia was originally inhabited by the elves, dwarves, and goblins. Fleeing the corruption of Aduria by the dark god Azrai, human tribes settled Cerilia. At first contact between the elves and humans was peaceful, but conflict soon arose as the human population expanded into elven lands.

After years of manipulation and machination Azrai's armies marched on Cerilia. On his side were his Adurian minions, the Vos (a human tribe he had corrupted), and the elves, bitter from their wars with humanity. The human tribes and their patron gods met him in battle at Mount Deismaar, located on the landbridge between Aduria and Cerilia. The elves realized they had been tricked by Azrai and most switched sides. As their armies fought on the slopes of the mountain, the gods themselves met in battle. The other gods were only able to defeat Azrai by sacrificing themselves. In a colossal explosion, they destroyed themselves and Azrai. Mount Deismaar and the land bridge were destroyed.

The power of the gods was not wasted, however. It shot out and entered those present at the battle. The champions of the gods, those closest in ideal and virtue to their patron as well as physical proximity at the time of the cataclysm, received the most power. They became gods themselves, a new pantheon that would replace the old.

Other combatants also received some of the divine power of the gods. On the battlefield it did not take them long to realize that this power was in their blood, and could be stolen. A scion, as one of the divine blood is called, could have his blood strength stolen if killed by a blow piercing his heart.

The divine gifts of the scions make them able leaders. They form a connection to their people and land, drawing strength from them. And in times of need returning that strength and perform great deeds. They also can have a variety of other divine powers, such as long life, the ability to detect poison or project a divine aura, depending upon their bloodline strength and the god it was derived from.

Those who find themselves with the blood of Azrai often become powerful abominations, or awnsheghlien. Corrupted by their dark blood, their bodies twist to reflect their inner corruption. Many of the major villains and monsters are awnsheghlien. Examples include the Gorgon (stone-skinned with a petrifying gaze, perhaps the strongest creature in Cerilia), the Sphinx (an insane half-cat lover of riddles), the Spider (once a goblin-king who fought at Deismaar), and the Vampire (once a young hero who killed a blood abomination named the Sinister and thus became corrupted himself).

== Domain level of play ==
Because bloodlines allow scions to collect regency the Birthright campaign includes a set of rules for players to participate in the "domain level" of play. That is, their characters can control various types of large-scale organizations. Those who rule such organizations are called regents. They are able to use the power they gain in the form of regency to manipulate events in and around their domain.

Domains are made up of provinces and holdings. Provinces are the basic political unit of the domain level. They represent the actual land, population and natural environment of a domain. There are four types of holdings; law, temples, guilds and sources. Law holdings represent the legal authority of regents in the province while temples and guild holdings are the religious and economic aspects of a province. Source holdings represent the magical energy contained by the natural environment of a province. Both provinces and holdings are described using levels.

The size and shape of provinces varies significantly in the published materials, but they average roughly thirty to forty miles across. Provinces have a population level (a number from 1–10) that has several effects on play. Regents collect regency (RP) based on the population levels of the provinces they control, and the population level determines the maximum level of law, temple and guild holdings in that province.

As regents, player characters can perform domain actions. Domain actions are month-long activities that have a wide range of effects. Increasing population, creating holdings, waging war, diplomacy, trade and dealing with random events are all possible domain actions. Regents can also choose to build castles, muster troops, issue decrees, establish treaties, etc.

Both priest and wizard characters are able to utilize their holdings (temples and sources, respectively) to cast realm spells. Realm spells are large-scale magic that can affect entire provinces. They are often costly both in terms of gold and regency.

War Magic involves the use of War Cards as part of simulating large-scale combat.

== Races ==
The primary races of the Birthright setting are typical for Dungeons and Dragons based game-worlds: Humans, Elves and Half-Elves, Halflings, Dwarves. However, there are some differences between the races presented in Birthright and those in other campaign settings or in the core rules. Also, non-human races do not have the variations that they do in other settings. Other races are notably missing from the setting. There are no Orcs or Half-Orcs. Kobolds and Gnomes are listed as existent monsters, but are not available as character races.

=== Humans ===
Humans are split into five distinct subraces, each representing a different culture:

- Anuireans are culturally similar to medieval western Europe. Feudal lords hold dominion, armored knights fill the military. At the battle of Mount Deismaar, the newly risen god Haelyn became their patron god. Haelyn's brother Roele founded the Aniurean Empire, which at one time encompassed more than half of all Cerilia. That empire lasted some thousand years until its decline. The subject realms subsequently won their independence and the twelve Duchies of Anuire fractured politically. Some 30 separate realms exist in Anuire.
- The Brecht humans tend to be individualistic and enterprising. They have a large middle class and merchant-princes hold much power. The Brecht are superb sailors, voyaging far and wide to trade. They depend upon their fleets and rugged mountains to defend their coastal realms. Their patron god is Sera, goddess of trade and luck. The Brecht draw elements from Renaissance Spain, Italy, the Netherlands and Germany, as well as the Hanseatic League.
- Khinasi lands are sometimes called "The Cities of the Sun". The cultured and civilized Khinasi have a distinctly Moorish flavor. They hold wizards and magicians in high regard and mages rule several city-states. Magic is much more common and accepted among the Khinasi than elsewhere in Cerilia. Their patron deity is the sun goddess Avani, whose portfolio includes enlightenment as well as illumination.
- The Rjurik humans live in the harsh climate of the Rjurik Highlands. They have cultural traits taken from the Celts and Scandinavians. Druids watch over the people and forests, jarls build and trek in longships, and semi-nomadic tribes debate whether to join their 'civilized' settled brethren. Much of Rjurik life is based on survival in their relatively harsh terrain. Their patron god is Erik, god of nature.
- The Vos were once dedicated to the god Vorynn, the old god of magic, but they were lured by the evil god Azrai and fought at his side at the battle of Mount Deismaar. They live in the harshest region of Cerilia, both in terms of climate and monstrous dangers. Their patron gods are now Belinik, god of violence, and Kriesha, goddess of winter. They have a warrior society based loosely on Slavic culture.

=== Non-human races ===
- Elves of Cerilia call themselves the Sidhelien and live in the ancient forests of Cerilia. They are generally antagonistic to humans—and most other Cerilian races. Unlike elves in other settings, Cerilian elves are generally chaotic neutral. Elves are immortal, immune to disease and do not need to sleep.
- Half-Elves bridge the gap between elves and humans. They are not immortal but are longer-lived than humans. Though elves are generally suspicious of humans they accept their rare offspring with mortals completely into their society, despite their mortality. Among humans, however, half-elves are treated with superstition and suspicion.
- Halflings are a race that is native to the Shadow World, but fled to Cerilia when a force of evil corrupted their homeland. They still bear the taint of their origins in the Shadow World and are able to cross over into that plane of existence more easily than any other race of Cerilia.
- Dwarves are a gruff mountain folk, whose bodies are twice as dense as other creatures. They weigh 250-300 pounds despite averaging only 4-4 1/2 feet tall. Dwarves are often isolationist and reserved.
- Goblins are less hated and feared than in other fantasy settings. Although seen as crude and barbaric, they have several large realms that trade with human realms.
- Orogs are a fierce, militaristic race that live primarily underground. They are in endless war with the dwarves and just about every other race of Cerilia.
- Gnolls, giants, and other Dungeons and Dragons races also exist.

As previously mentioned, there are no orcs in Cerilia. Gnomes are on the list of "AD&D Monsters in Cerilia" in the Birthright Rulebook and are also mentioned in the "King of the Giantdowns" adventure, but are not available as a player character race.

== List of Birthright products ==
During its four-year run, 25 roleplaying products and five novels were published by TSR, as well as a computer game by Sierra On-Line. The line was suspended before the publishing schedule was complete. By the time Wizards of the Coast had cancelled the line after buying TSR, they had published the following:

=== Boxed sets ===
- 3100 Birthright Campaign Setting
- 3103 Cities of the Sun
- 3121 The Rjurik Highlands
- 3129 Havens of the Great Bay
- 3134 Naval Battle Rules: The Seas of Cerilia

=== Accessories ===
- 3104 Player's Secrets of Roesone
- 3105 Player's Secrets of Endier
- 3106 Player's Secrets of Medoere
- 3107 Player's Secrets of Tuornen
- 3108 Player's Secrets of Ilien
- 3109 Player's Secrets of Talinie
- 3111 Player's Secrets of Ariya
- 3119 Player's Secrets of Binsada
- 3120 Player's Secrets of Baruk-Azhik
- 3122 Player's Secrets of Halskapa
- 3123 Player's Secrets of Khourane
- 3124 Player's Secrets of Tuarhievel
- 3127 Player's Secrets of Stjordvik
- 3135 Player's Secrets of Hogunmark
- Player's Secrets of Müden
- 3101 Blood Enemies: Abominations of Cerilia
- 3140 Blood Spawn: Creatures of Light and Shadow
- 3147 Tribes of the Heartless Wastes
- 3117 The Book of Magecraft
- 3126 The Book of Priestcraft
- 3137 The Book of Regency

=== Adventures ===
- 3102 Sword and Crown
- 3110 Warlock of the Stonecrowns
- 3118 The Sword of Roele
- 3125 Legends of the Hero-Kings
- 3142 King of the Giantdowns

=== Novels ===
- The Iron Throne by Simon Hawke (Nov, 1995. ISBN 0-7869-0357-0)
- Greatheart by Dixie Lee McKeone (Feb, 1996. ISBN 0-7869-0480-1)
- War by Simon Hawke (May 1996. ISBN 0-7869-0495-X)
- The Hag's Contract by John Gregory Betancourt (June 1996. ISBN 0-7869-0496-8)
- The Spider's Test by Dixie Lee McKeone (Sept, 1996. ISBN 0-7869-0512-3)
- The Falcon and the Wolf by Richard Baker (May 2000, online publication)

=== Comics ===
- The Serpent's Eye by Ed Stark (1996)

=== Computer games ===
- Birthright - The Gorgon's Alliance by Sierra On-Line

=== Later material ===
In 2005, to celebrate Birthright's 10th anniversary, Wizards of the Coast announced the free web release of a series of published and unpublished Birthright products including the novel The Falcon and the Wolf by Birthright creator Richard Baker III, although only the first few releases were actually published.

A version of Birthright was constructed for use with the revised Third Edition of Dungeons & Dragons rules. This group project is collaboratively structured over the Internet, and recognized as the official fan site of the setting by Wizards of the Coast.

== Sources ==
- Baker III, L. Richard; Colin McComb (1995). Birthright Campaign Setting. TSR, Inc.
