= DragonStrike (board game) =

Adventure board game

Dragon Strike
- Box cover art
- Designers: Bruce Nesmith & Andria Hayday
- Publishers: TSR
- Publication: 1993
- Players: 1 to 6

Dragon Strike is a 1993 adventure board game from TSR, Inc. based on the Dungeons & Dragons (D&D) fantasy role-playing game. It was intended to be a pathway for beginners to start with, and for players to eventually play the full Advanced Dungeons & Dragons tabletop game after kindling their interest.

== Overview ==
Dragon Strike is a hybrid between a board game and a tabletop role playing game. It was designed to be a gateway into Dungeons & Dragons for new and young players. The game used a ruleset that was simpler than the basic Dungeons & Dragons rules to make it easier to play. The designers hoped to attract players as young as eight years old.

The game came with several fold-out maps, cards, dice, an instructional VHS video, and a number of plastic miniatures. They represent the player characters, monsters, traps, treasure and status effects. The game included several pre-created quests available for play, one of which could be played solo.

=== VHS video ===
A video titled Dragon Strike came with the game on a VHS tape, intended to make the game more accessible to young players. It tells a story of the quest of a band of heroes, while demonstrating how to play the game. The "host" is playing the Dragon Master, trying to kindle the imagination and giving instructions on gameplay. The video also shows a live action story, featuring real-life actors. The video bears only a moderate resemblance to the actual board game. At the end of the tape is a section for the Dragon Master, which includes tips and tricks to help the players have fun, as well as making the game challenging.

The tape was prepared by Flint Dille and his Hollywood contacts, albeit on a low budget. The production was filmed with extensive use of blue screen, with actors acting against a blue screen, and a fantasy background replaced in post-production. The shooting and script were based on an early draft of the rulebook before the game was finalized, and so does not match the actual game perfectly. Monsters such as minotaurs and owlbears, plus the cleric class, make an appearance in the video but not the game itself.

=== Gameplay ===
The Dragon Strike game presents the basics of role-playing games in an innovative board-game format. The rules cast players in the roles of dwarves, thieves, and other fantasy archetypes. Each player receives a card representing his character, which shows ratings for Armor Class, Speed, Attack Strength, and special abilities. A clip attached to the side of the card keeps track of the character's Hit Points. The Dragon Master—the Dragon Strike equivalent of a Dungeon Master—prepares a session by selecting a mission from the Adventure Book, locates the indicated markers and cards, then responds with monsters, traps, and treasures as the characters wander around the colorful map board. A mission must be completed within a fixed number of turns.

The Dragon Master controls the actions of the monsters and non-player characters. To resolve combat, the Dragon Master compares the Attack Strength to the target's Armor Class; if the Attack Roll is higher, the target loses one Hit Point. Equally simple rules cover spell casting, feats of strength, and flying.

== Publication history ==
The Dragon Strike game was designed by Bruce Nesmith and Andria Hayday, and published by TSR, Inc. in 1993.

In August 1993, issue #196 of Dragon Magazine included an additional scenario/adventure titled "The Dragon Orb".

DragonStrike was part of an initiative by TSR to make their games accessible to young players. A 1992 introductory product called Dragon Quest and First Quest in 1994 was also part of this effort.

== In other media ==
In 1994, Marvel Comics published a one-shot comic book authorized adaptation of Dragon Strike, written by Jeff Grubb, penciled by Mike Harris, and inked by Frank Percy.

Four books were written about each of the major classes featured in the video. Warrior, Elf, Wizard and Thief were the titles, and expanded on the lore and adventures leading up to the video and game.

WildSpace: Announced as a proposed TV series or expansion to Dragon Strike called WildSpace and featuring a return of several of the original cast, this time traveling into Spelljammer's WildSpace setting. Aside from a flyer announcement and a trailer, WildSpace was never produced.

== Reception ==
Rick Swan reviewed Dragon Strike for TSR's own Dragon magazine #200 (December 1993). Swan claims that "if this doesn't lure your kid brother into the hobby, it probably can't be done", calling it "perhaps the most lavishly packaged, user-friendliest introduction to role-playing ever published". He compliments the game overall by stating: "The much-touted (and unfairly criticized) videotape accomplishes exactly what it's supposed to: Define role-playing for those who wouldn't know a saving throw from a savings bond. What distinguishes the Dragon Strike game from other fantasy board games is, of course, the emphasis on verbal interaction. This may be nothing new to veteran gamers, but for novices, the effect is startling. It's as if pawns on a chessboard started talking back. After a few rounds of Dragon Strike's "Role-playing Lite", I suspect most players will be salivating for the real thing".

The game sold acceptably well, selling out its initial printing of 100,000 copies, with orders for 50,000 more from toy and hobby stores. The financial success of the product was compromised by overprinting, however. TSR CEO Lorraine Williams opted to do a reprint of 150,000 copies rather than the 50,000 additional copies ordered. The extra 100,000 orders did not appear with time, and the excess copies largely sat in a warehouse. The excess copies were eventually sold at deeply discounted clearance rates, as low as a dollar a copy, compromising the overall profitability of the product for TSR. Dale Donovan described the overprinting of DragonStrike as "snatch[ing] defeat from the jaws of victory". The overprinting did have the benefit of allowing TSR to essentially take out a "loan" from Random House, as TSR's contract with them allowed them to ship the excess copies to Random House for immediate payment, and only be charged with debt later after the unsold copies were returned.

== Reviews ==
- Casus Belli #77

== Hasbro game ==
In 2002, Hasbro released a board game called Dragon Strike, which was unrelated to the 1993 version of Dragon Strike.

== See also ==
- Dungeon Masters Adventure Log
- Forged of Darkness
- Non-Player Character Records
- Permanent Character Folder & Adventure Records
- The Silver Key (module)
- Treasure Tales
