= John Dollar =

American artist

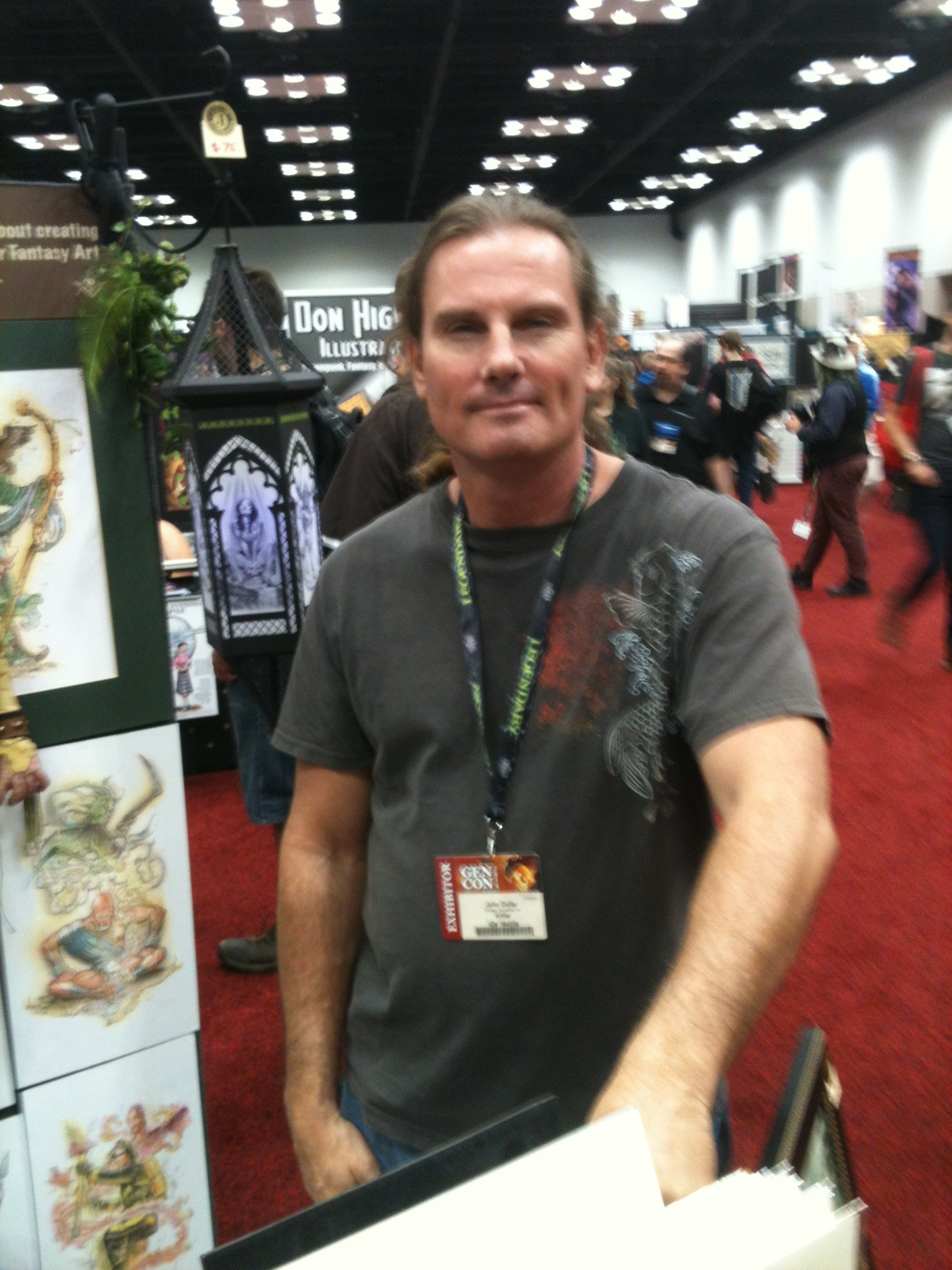
- Born: 1961; Georgia, US
- Known for: Fantasy art

John Dollar (born 1961 in Georgia) is an American artist best known for his contributions to a number of RPG settings during the mid-to-late 90s (TSR properties and White Wolf's Changeling).

== Biography ==
John Dollar's illustrations have appeared in many gaming products, some of which include TSR, Inc.'s Dungeons & Dragons campaign settings Ravenloft, Birthright, Dark Sun, and Planescape and Dragon Magazine and Dungeon Magazine articles, FASA's Earthdawn, West End Games' Star Wars RPG, White Wolf Publishing's Werewolf: The Apocalypse and Changeling: The Dreaming, Larry Elmore's Sovereign Stone, and just recently to Tales of the Emerald Serpent anthology and the Shadowhunter's Codex by Cassandra Claire.

== Published works ==
The following bibliography is a list where John Dollar's art work has appeared.

=== The Shadowhunter Chronicles, Cassandra Claire ===
- "The Shadowhunter's Codex, A Guide to the World of the Nephilim", September 2013

=== White Wolf Publishing ===
==== World of Darkness ====
- "World of Darkness: Time of Judgement", 2004

==== Changeling: The Dreaming ====
- "Kithbook: Sluagh", 1997
- "Kithbook: Nockers", 1997
- "Changeling: The Dreaming", 2nd Edition, 1997

=== West End Games ===
==== Star Wars ====
- "The Jedi Academy", 1996

=== TSR, Inc. ===
==== Dragon Magazine ====
- "Ecology of the Crystal Spider", Dragon Magazine #221, September 1995
- "Defilers and Preservers", Dragon Magazine #231, July 1996
- "Artifacts of Athas, Powerful relics for the Dark Sun setting", Dragon Magazine #234, October 1996

==== Dungeon Magazine ====
- "Seeking Bloodsilver", Dungeon Magazine #59, May/June 1996
- "The Baron's Eyrie", Dungeon Magazine #58, March/April 1996
- "Cloaked in Fear", Dungeon Magazine #57, January/February 1996

==== Forgotten Realms ====
- "Warriors and Priests of the Realms", 1996

==== Ravenloft ====
- "Death Unchained", 1996
- "Death Ascendant", 1996
- "Forged of Darkness", 1996

==== Birthright ====
- "Player's Secrets of Khourane", 1996
- "Havens of the Great Bay", 1996
- "Sword and Crown", 1995
- "Cities of the Sun", 1995

==== Dark Sun ====
- "Thri-Kreen of Athas", 1995
- "Windriders of the Jagged Cliffs The Wanderer’s Chronicle", 1995
- "Beyond the Prism Pentad", 1995
- "Dark Sun Campaign Setting, Expanded and Revised", 1995
