= Allen Varney =

American writer and game designer (born 1958)

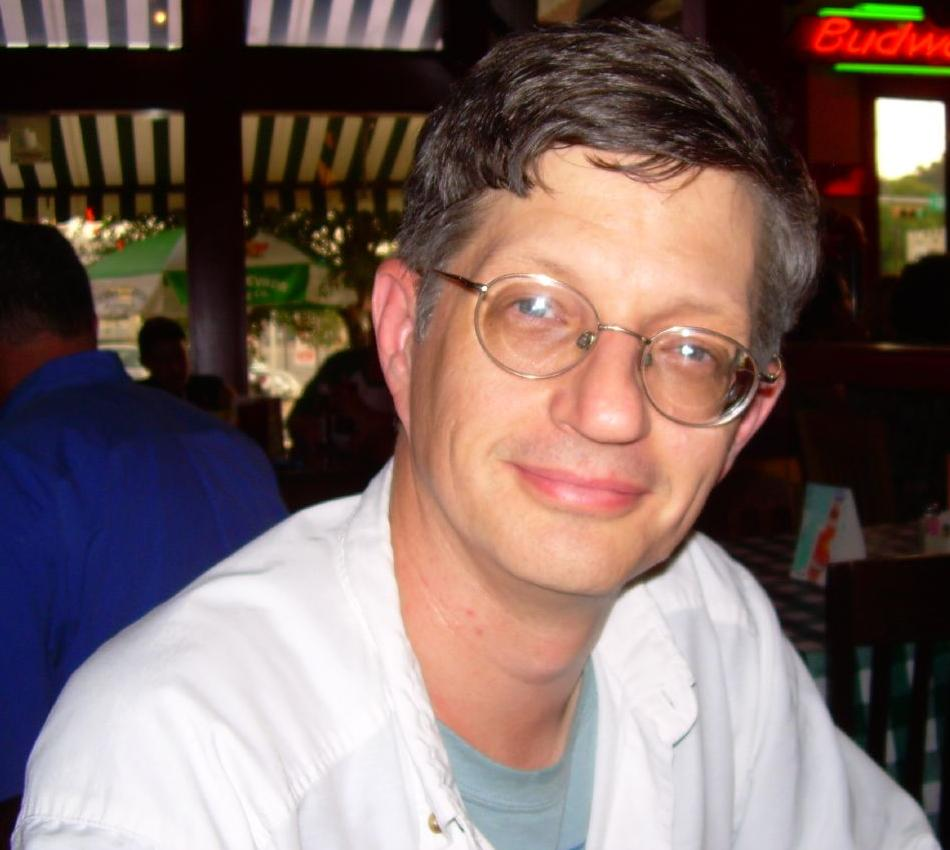
- Varney in 2006
- Born: 1958 (age 67–68); St. Louis, Missouri, United States
- Education: University of Nevada, Reno (BA)
- Spouse: Beth Fischi
- Writing career
- Genre: Role-playing games

Allen Varney (born 1958) is an American writer and game designer. Varney has produced numerous books, role-playing game supplements, technical manuals, articles, reviews, columns, and stories, as well as the fantasy novel Cast of Fate (TSR, 1996). Since the 1990s, he has worked primarily in computer games.

== Early life ==
Varney was born in St. Louis, Missouri and was raised by his mother, Marcelene Varney. He graduated from Reno High School in 1976 and has a dual BA in English and history from the University of Nevada, Reno.

== Gaming career ==
=== Roleplaying games ===
Varney designed the game Necromancer (1983), which was published by Steve Jackson Games. Varney wrote Son of Toon (1986), the third supplement to the Toon RPG. From 1984 to 1986 he worked as Assistant Editor at Steve Jackson Games (with Warren Spector, then editor-in-chief) editing Space Gamer magazine.

Warren Spector and Varney wrote the supplement Send in the Clones (1985) for the Paranoia role-playing game from West End Games. In 1986, he left Steve Jackson Games to freelance. From this time onward, he wrote a large body of game supplements for companies like TSR, Inc., FASA Corporation, West End Games, and White Wolf.

Varney did work for TSR from 1987 to 1992, including the "Blood Brethren" trilogy (Nightwail, Nightrage, Nightstorm) and Five Coins for a Kingdom, Wildspace for Spelljammer, Veiled Alliance for Dark Sun, and several gamebooks, the Ariya, Binsada, and Talinie realm packs for Birthright. He also edited modules for the Ravenloft, Planescape, and Forgotten Realms settings, and was a game reviewer and news columnist for Dragon magazine.

Varney wrote the AD&D Gamebook The Vanishing City in 1987, and the Endless Quest gamebook Galactic Challenge for Amazing Engine in 1995.

Varney served as the line editor for a new version of the roleplaying game Paranoia, published in 2004 by Mongoose Publishing. He wrote the new rules and packaged the game's support line with the help of his "Traitor Recycling Studio" until 2006 when Mongoose put the game line on hold.

Most recently, Varney has operated the Bundle of Holding site, distributing bundles of licensed but DRM-free role-playing game files in a series of time-limited offers.

=== Computer games ===
Enspire Learning produces a computer version of Varney's multiplayer business ethics and leadership simulation, the Executive Challenge. Executive Challenge was covered in The Wall Street Journal.

Varney has long been involved in the game design and documentation for companies such as Origin Systems, Interplay, Prodigy, Acclaim Entertainment, Looking Glass Technologies, MicroProse, and Sony Online Entertainment. He wrote character dialogue for Star Wars Galaxies, and worked again with Warren Spector on Epic Mickey.

Varney also writes for The Escapist.

=== Card games ===
In 1993, Varney designed an expansion set for Magic: The Gathering. This was not published, but the design concepts later surfaced in the web-based Vanguard format of the game, with Varney credited for the original concept.

== Personal life ==
Varney has participated in the Texas Juggling Society at the University of Texas since 1985.
