= 1993 Origins Award winners =

The following are the winners of the 20th annual (1993) Origins Award, presented at Origins 1994:

Category	Winner	Company	Designer(s)
Best Historical Figure Series of 1993	Medievals 15mm	Soldiers & Swords	Robert Perez
Best Fantasy or Science Fiction Figure Series of 1993	Advanced Dungeons & Dragons	Ral Partha	Dennis Mize, James Johnson, Geoffrey Valley, David Summers, Jeffrey Wilhelm, Richard Kerr
Best Vehicular Series of 1993	Battle Tech	Ral Partha	David Summers, James Johnson, Richard Kerr, Jeffrey Wilhelm
Best Game Accessory of 1993	Destiny Deck	Stellar Games	Dennis McKiernan, Peter Busch
Best Miniatures Rules of 1993	Warhammer 40,000 2nd Edition	Games Workshop	Rick Priestley, Andy Chambers
Best Roleplaying Rules of 1993	Traveller: The New Era	Game Designer's Workshop	Frank Chadwick, David Nilsen
Best Roleplaying Adventure of 1993	Dragon Mountain	TSR	Colin McComb
Best Roleplaying Supplement of 1993	GURPS Vampire - The Masquerade	Steve Jackson Games	
Best Graphic Presentation of a Roleplaying Game, Adventure, or Supplement of 1993	Underground	Mayfair Games	Maria Cabardo
Best Pre-20th Century Boardgame of 1993	History of the World	The Avalon Hill Game Company	The Ragnar Brothers, Don Greenwood
Best Modern-Day Boardgame of 1993	Hacker II	Steve Jackson Games	Steve Jackson
Best Fantasy or Science Fiction Boardgame of 1993	Magic: the Gathering	Wizards of the Coast	Richard Garfield
Best Graphic Presentation of a Boardgame of 1993	Magic: the Gathering	Wizards of the Coast	
Best Play-by-Mail Game of 1993	Illuminati	Flying Buffalo	Draper Kauffman
Best New Play-by-Mail Game of 1993	Quest: The World of Kharne	Adventures By Mail	Kevin Cropper, David Bolton, Nigel Mitchell, Steven Fairbrother
Best Fantasy or Science Fiction Computer Game of 1993	X-Wing	Lucas Arts	
Best Military or Strategy Computer Game of 1993	Seven Cities of Gold, Commemorative Edition	Electronic Arts	Bill Bunten, Dan Bunten, Michael Kosaka
Best Professional Adventure Gaming Magazine of 1993	Dragon Magazine	TSR	Roger Moore, Kim Mohan, Dale Donovan
Best Amateur Adventure Gaming Magazine of 1993	Berg's Review of Games	Richard Berg	
Adventure Gaming Hall of Fame	Ace of Aces	Nova Games	Al Leonardi, Douglas Kaufman, Jerry Redding
Adventure Gaming Hall of Fame	Diplomacy	Games Research, Inc, The Avalon Hill Game Company	Allan Calhamer
Adventure Gaming Hall of Fame	Don Featherstone, Michael A. Stackpole		
