= Stan! =

American game designer and writer

Steven "Stan!" Brown
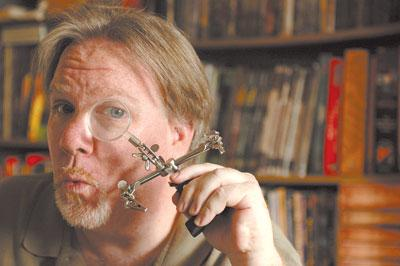
- Stan! Brown
- Occupations: Writer; cartoonist; game designer
- Writing career
- Genres: Role-playing games, fantasy

Stan! (born Steven Brown) is an American author, cartoonist, and game designer. He is sometimes credited as Stan Brown.

== Biography ==
Brown was born and grew up on Long Island and attended Binghamton University. Brown began publishing fiction, cartoons, and games professionally in 1982, usually under the pen name "Stan!." He is the author of numerous short stories, novels, roleplaying products, comics and cartoons. He has served as a graphic designer and line editor for West End Games; an editor and game designer for TSR, Inc.; and an author, senior game designer, and creative director for Wizards of the Coast, Inc. He has also been the creative content manager at Upper Deck Entertainment.

In 2007, R. Hyrum Savage formed a subsidiary of his OtherWorld Creations with Brown called Super Genius Games. He has also worked as the creative content manager for Upper Deck Entertainment, and the creative vice president for The Game Mechanics, Inc. Brown is the Creative Director for Super Genius Games. He co-founded The Game Mechanics with JD Wiker, Marc Schmalz, and Rich Redman.

Stan! has worked on a variety of role-playing titles, including Paranoia, Dragonlance, Marvel Super Heroes, Ravenloft, and Forgotten Realms, as well as being a principal designer for d20 Modern. He is also the author of two novels published by Wizards of the Coast.

== Bibliography ==
=== Fiction ===
- Dragon Day (MSP 2005)
- Dragons' Return—This Land is in Our Blood (MP 2005)
- Children of the Rune—Skin Deep (MP 2004)
- Brothers of the Monkey—Chapter Two (WotC website 2002)
- Bertrem's Guide to the War of Souls, vol. 2—A Journey to Schallsea and The Insurrection That Never Was (WotC 2002)
- The Crab (WotC 2001)
- Bertrem's Guide to the Age of Mortals—"Regional Dietary Regimens", "Celebrations and Festivals", and *"Popular Games of the Fifth Age" (WotC 2000)
- More Leaves From the Inn of the Last Home—“Slugs, Fungi, Molds, and Other Things I Hope To Never See Again” (WotC 2000)
- The Odyssey of Gilthanas (TSR 1999) *
- Realms of Mystery—Ekhar Lorent: Gnome Detective (TSR 1998)
- Mysterious Cairo—The Sands of Change (WEG 1992)

==== Game design ====
- Modern Organizations: Crime & Punishment (TGM 2005)
- Crossing the Line (WotC web site 2005)
- Complete Adventurer (WotC 2005)
- d20 Future (WotC 2004)
- A Friendly Warning (WotC web site 2004)
- Planar Handbook (WotC 2004)
- Modern Magic print edition (GR 2004)
- Crisis on Canyon Road (WotC web site 2004)
- Modern Magic, volume 2 (TGM 2004)
- The Ghost in the End Zone (RPGA 2004)
- Resolutions (WotC web site 2004)
- Modern Magic, volume 1 (TGM 2003)
- The Dead of Winter (WotC web site 2003)
- Criminal Intent: The Villain's Almanac (GoO 2003)
- The Final Feast (WotC web site 2003)
- Blood Sugar (WotC web site 2003)
- Modern Player's Companion print edition (GR 2003)
- The Petersen Counterstrike (WotC web site 2003)
- Bad Moon Waning (WotC web site 2003)
- A Funny Thing Happened At Carousel #5 (WotC web site 2003)
- Modern Player's Companion, volume 2 (TGM 2003)
- Stone Dead (WotC web site 2003)
- Urban Arcana Campaign Setting (WotC 2003)
- Modern Player's Companion, volume 1 (TGM 2003)
- No Man's Land (WotC web site 2003)
- d20 Modern RPG (WotC 2002)
- Bastion of Broken Souls (WotC 2002)
- Book of Challenges (WotC 2002)
- Beginner Games—prototypes (WotC 2000)
- Rise of the Titans (WotC 2000)
- Pokémon Jr. Adventure Game (WotC 1999)
- Children of the Night: The Created (TSR 1999)
- The Odyssey of Gilthanas (TSR 1999)
- Children of Solace (RPGA 1999)
- Dragonlance Classics 15th Anniversary Edition (TSR 1999)
- Palanthas (TSR 1998)
- Trail of the Tylor (RPGA 1998)
- The Dragonlance Bestiary (TSR 1998)
- Marvel Super Heroes Adventure Game (TSR 1998)
- Citadel of Light (TSR 1998)
- Pyramids of Brass (RPGA 1998)
- Leviathan's Deep (RPGA 1998)
- SAGA Fate Deck (TSR 1997)
- Heroes of Sorcery (TSR 1997)
- Children of the Night: Ghosts (TSR 1997)
- Cryptic Campaigns (WEG 1996)
- Fires of Marl (WEG 1996)
- Shadow of a Black Sun (WEG 1995)

==== Articles ====
- The Essential Modern Spellbook (Green Ronin web site 2004)
- The Odds Breaker (TGM web site 2004)
- The Creation of the D&D Worlds (Dragon Magazine #315)
- The Itinerant Bazaar (WotC web site)
- Modern Talents (TGM web site)
- Modern Classes (TGM web site)
- Making Urban Arcana More Prestigious (WotC web site 2003)
- Fharlanghn's Garden (WotC web site)
- Compete Feats (TGM web site)
- Urban Heroes (Dragon Magazine #305)
- The Geography of Bertrem's Guide to the War of Souls, volume 2 (WotC web site 2002)
- The D&D Player's Movie Marathon (Dragon Magazine #283)
- Have You Seen My Youthful Innocence Around Here Somewhere? (Shred Magazine #4)
- Be Kind To Be Cruel—Brewing A Truly Terrifying Campaign (Shred Magazine #3)
- Extra! Extra! Read All About It!—Applying Tabloid Journalism to Your Campaign (Shred Magazine #2)
- GMing RPGs Under A Time Limit (Shred Magazine #1)
- How Do You Stop The Rhino From Charging? (Dungeon Magazine #71)
- Hark, The Herald (Dragon Magazine Annual #2)
- HOM-Sector For The HOL-I-DAY (Polyhedron #127)
- Undead Again (Dragon Magazine #234)

==== Cartoons and illustrations ====
- Typos of Doom '06 (WotC web site)
- Ptypos of Doom (Malhavoc Press web site)
- Typos of Doom '05 (WotC web site)
- Iyov's First Quest online D&D coloring album (WotC web site)
- WotC Book Department 2004 Holiday Card (WotC web site)
- 2004 D&D Holiday Cards (WotC web site)
- Pledge Drive Cartoons (KPLU radio station)
- Cold Pizza host D&D caricatures (ESPN2)
- Typos of Doom (WotC web site)
- Humorous PC Portraits (WotC web site)
- Monstrous Madness (AndyCollins.net)
- WotC Book Department 2003 Holiday Card (WotC web site)
- 2003 D&D Holiday Cards (WotC web site)
- 2003 TGM Holiday Card (TGM web site)
- Grub's First Adventure online D&D coloring album (WotC web site)
- Gen Con Time Warp puzzle contest (Gen Con 2003)
- Goblin Fey Hunter (TGM web site)
- April Fool's Day Maps 2003—Dirt Cavern, Ice Maze, and The Underdark (WotC web site)
- The Year of Solving Dangerously (Games Magazine April 2003)
- WotC Book Department 2002 Holiday Card (WotC web site)
- Lair of the Beholder online D&D coloring album (WotC web site)
- 2002 D&D Holiday Cards (WotC web site)
- Gen Con Time Warp puzzle contest (Gen Con 2002)
- Hick the RPG cover illustration (ID Adventures)
- Table Talk comic strip (Campaign Magazine issue #s 4 – 12)
- April Fool's Day Map 2002 (WotC web site)
- Bolt & Quiver comic strip (Dungeon/Polyhedron Magazine issue #s 90 – 106) •
- All's Fair in Love and Warcraft (Dragon Magazine Annual 2001)
- WotC Book Department 2001 Holiday Card (WotC web site)
- The D&D Player's Movie Marathon (Dragon Magazine #283)
- Table Talk comic strip (Shred Magazine issue #s 1 – 7)
- Dr. Symm comic strip (Shred Magazine issue #s 1 – 7)
- Cover Illustrations (Shred Magazine issue #s 1 – 7)
- The Reed Richards Guide to Everything (WotC 1999)
- Marvel Super Heroes Adventure Game (WotC 1998)
- HOM-Sector For The HOL-I-DAY (Polyhedron #127)

==== Editing ====
- d20 Modern Menace Manual (WotC 2003)
- Dragon Dice: Dice Commander's Manual (TSR 1997)
- Requiem (TSR 1996)
- Death Ascendant (TSR 1996)
- Death Unchained (TSR 1996)

== Media mentions ==
Stan! has appeared in the following newspaper and magazine articles, websites and podcasts.

=== Podcasts ===
- Atomic Array: Stan! appeared on these episodes: 037 (Snows of an Early Winter).
- RPG Countdown: Stan! appeared on these episodes: 18 December 2009 (The Genius Guide to the Shadow Assassin).

=== Videos ===
- Meet Stan!: A 29-minute video of Stan! telling about his life growing up, going to school and getting into the gaming industry.
- Secrets of TSR: Panel discussion from PaizoCon 2012. Stan! tells some great stories about his time working on Dungeons & Dragons.
- Stan!, Gamerati: Stan! talks about his time living in Japan, starting the countries first English-language gaming guild, etc.
