= Windriders of the Jagged Cliffs =

1995 role-playing game accessory

- Genre: Role-playing games
- Publisher: TSR
- Publication date: 1995

Windriders of the Jagged Cliffs is an accessory for the 2nd edition of the Advanced Dungeons & Dragons fantasy role-playing game, published in 1995.

== Contents ==
Windriders of the Jagged Cliffs is part of the "Wanderer's Chronicles" line for the Dark Sun setting, which details areas of Athas that are located far from the city of Tyr. This is a self-contained volume, a book which describes the location and includes an introductory adventure for the area, and also comes with a fold-out color map. A race of halflings, which can trace its ancestry directly back to the ancient days of the Blue Age, lives in communities built along the faces of the Jagged Cliffs. Unlike the feral halflings that more commonly appear in the setting, these halflings have constructed a sophisticated society, and value all life highly. By means of long ago discovered genetic engineering techniques, these halflings can manipulate life to create tools and creatures for their own use.

== Publication history ==
Design was by Monte Cook, and Doug Stewart was the editor. Cover art was by Stephen A. Daniele, with interior art by Jim Crabtree, John Dollar, and Sue Billings.

== Reception ==
Cliff Ramshaw reviewed Windriders of the Jagged Cliffs for Arcane magazine, rating it a 7 out of 10 overall. Ramshaw commented on the book: "An awful lot of sustained creative effort has gone into Jagged Cliffs. The halfling society is concrete, detailed, believable and enticing, and the accompanying adventure, while not earth-shattering, serves as a decent introduction to the area."

== Reviews ==
- Casus Belli #93
