= Greatheart =

Greatheart may refer to:

- Greatheart (McKeone novel), a 1996 fantasy novel set in the world of Birthright
- Greatheart (Dell novel), a 1918 novel by Ethel M. Dell
- Greatheart (film), a 1921 film directed by George Ridgwell
- Greatheart, a character from The Pilgrim's Progress by John Bunyan
- Greatheart Mesa, a landform in Utah, USA.
