= Ilien =

Ilien may refer to:

- Bruno Ilien (born 1959), French racing driver
- Player's Secrets of Ilien, role-playing game supplement
- Ilien Tang (died 1920), Chinese educator
