= The Outcast (Hawke novel) =

1993 fantasy novel by Simon Hawke

- Cover of the first edition
- Author: Simon Hawke
- Language: English
- Genre: Novel
- Published: 1993
- Publication place: United States
- Media type: Print
- ISBN: 1-56076-676-X

The Outcast is a 1993 fantasy novel by Simon Hawke, set in the world of Dark Sun, and based on the Dungeons & Dragons role-playing game. It is the first novel in the "Tribe of One" trilogy. It was published in paperback in November 1993.

== Plot summary ==
Sorak is part elf and part halfling and has multiple personalities as a result of childhood trauma and is on a quest for a savior for the dying world of Athas.

== Reception ==
A reviewer from Publishers Weekly comments that Hawke "more than intimates that Sorak himself is the long-awaited savior. His yarn offers fans of the fantasy genre some interesting themes to ponder."

Chris Wilson writing for Time describes The Outcast and The Tribe of One Trilogy as a fantasy epic that would have made for better TV than Game of Thrones.

== Reviews ==
- Review by Don D'Ammassa (1993) in Science Fiction Chronicle, #168 December 1993
- Kliatt
