= Havens of the Great Bay =

1996 role-playing game accessory

- Cover
- Genre: Role-playing games
- Publisher: TSR
- Publication date: 1996

Havens of the Great Bay is an accessory for the 2nd edition of the Advanced Dungeons & Dragons fantasy role-playing game, published in 1996.

== Contents ==
Havens of the Great Bay is a supplement which adds more domains that player characters may rule. The realms of Brechtur which are located around the great bay of Cerilia are populated largely by elves, dwarves and the Brechts.

== Publication history ==
Havens of the Great Bay was published by TSR, Inc. in 1996.

== Reception ==
David Comford reviewed Havens of the Great Bay for Arcane magazine, rating it a 7 out of 10 overall. He commented that "The number and variety of domains for players to control in Birthright is huge, and Havens of the Great Bay is another collection of them." and he noted that "a number of [the realms] capture the imagination - Drachenward, home to no less than four Cerilian Dragons, and awnshegh realms such as that controlled by the Vampire, the Hag and the schizophrenic Banshegh to mention but a brief selection of them." As far as whether the product offers anything of real value to the game apart from "yet more domains", he answered his own question: "Well, a new player character, The Guilder, is presented together with two new Domain actions, and the war cards are of a good strength and variety - this is about it, however." Comford continued: "To get the most out of Havens of the Great Bay, the Blood Enemies supplement will have to be used as an accompaniment because a number of references are made to it. In addition either Cities of the Sun or Naval Battle Rules [...] will need to be handy for reference because the sea plays an important role in each realm." He added: "If you want to collect each box-set to hold details on the entire Birthright world then go ahead. It's not a bad expansion, though the quality of artwork on the handouts is a little varied." Comford concluded his review by saying, "Otherwise I recommend you read about the Brechts from the campaign setting box-set, and buy a selection of the Player's Secrets series which will doubtless follow."
