= Yermakov =

Yermakov (Russian: Ермаков), or Yermakova (feminine: Ермакова), sometimes spelt Ermakov or Ermakova respective of the gender, is a Russian surname. Notable people with the surname include:

- Anastasiya Yermakova (born 1983), Russian Olympic synchronised swimmer
- Dmitri Ivanovich Yermakov (1846–1916), Russian photographer
- Nicholas Yermakov/Simon Hawke, American writer
- Oksana Yermakova (born 1973), Estonian and Russian Olympic champion épée fencer
- Pyotr Ermakov, Bolshevik war commissar
- Yevgeniya Yermakova (born 1976), Kazakh freestyle swimmer
