= What's That Smell? =

What's That Smell? is a 2001 role-playing game adventure published by Wicked Press.

== Plot summary ==
What's That Smell? is an adventure in which the player characters investigate an abandoned halfling village filled with bizarre, foul‑smelling creatures in a modular, rearrangeable adventure for character levels 4–7.

== Reviews ==
- Pyramid
- Backstab #34
