= War (Hawke novel) =

Novel by Simon Hawke

- Cover
- Author: Simon Hawke
- Language: English
- Genre: Fantasy novel
- Published: 1996
- Publication place: United States
- Media type: Print
- ISBN: 0-7869-0495-X

War is a fantasy novel by Simon Hawke, set in the world of Birthright, and based on the Dungeons & Dragons role-playing game. The novel was published in May 1996 (ISBN 0-7869-0495-X).

== Plot summary ==
War is a novel in which the humans have driven the indigenous elves to return to the forest of Cerilia, after the servants of the Dark One forced the humans away from their own ancestral lands, leaving the elves with an uneasy peace with the humans after centuries of conflict. The elves must deal with an empty throne while they fear that the humans will continue to expand their civilization into the forest.

== Reception ==
Jonathan Palmer reviewed War for Arcane magazine, rating it an 8 out of 10 overall. He comments that "Hawke seems to be building himself a soap opera here, one perhaps more like Dallas than anything else. The sequel to The Iron Throne [...] is aptly titled, but the plot of this new series of Birthright books is beginning to focus on what goes on in the bedroom rather than what happens on the battlefield. This writer likes to describe intrigue born of sexual power, blackmail and underhand dealings, and he interprets (probably correctly) civil war as a time for personal vendettas as well as national scores." He continues: "Although this is 'Time of Legends' fantasy, there are a lot of parallels with the politics of the Arizona Indian Reservation where the author lives. Gannd, the son of the elf warrior Sylvanna and Lord Aedan of Anuire, is what humans pejoratively refer to as a 'breed' - half-elf, half-human. His character develops as he travels with the rather two-dimensional Reese. [...] And, if you don't want politics, Simon Hawke is also obviously an American football fan as one scene clearly shows." Palmer concludes his review by saying, "Hawke's world is detailed and convincing. He writes with a languid confidence and the clarity not to confuse you with the intricacy of his plotting. The Iron Throne had an easier wit, but this is a commendable sequel and an inspiring read for anyone involved in a Birthright campaign. You don't need to have read the first book to enjoy War, because much of what has happened before is cleverly re-capped. But I would advise you to do so anyway, not because it has the same cover image, but because it's good and this series could go on for a while."

== Reviews ==
- Backstab #9
