= Naval Battle Rules: The Seas of Cerilia =

1996 role-playing game accessory

- Genre: Role-playing games
- Publisher: TSR
- Publication date: 1996

Naval Battle Rules: The Seas of Cerilia is an accessory for the 2nd edition of the Advanced Dungeons & Dragons fantasy role-playing game, published in 1996. The rules are intended for the Birthright campaign setting.

== Contents ==
Naval Battle Rules is a supplement which includes 51 naval war cards, as well as rules for both general and magical warfare on the open sea, dealing with maritime movement and hazards, and information on trade routes for the setting.

== Publication history ==
Naval Battle Rules was published by TSR, Inc. in 1996.

== Reception ==
David Comford reviewed Naval Battle Rules for Arcane magazine, rating it a 4 out of 10 overall. He comments that "Naval forces are a vital part of any ruler's military - not only for warfare and conquest but for exploration and trade, so it was a little surprising that they weren't included in the basic Birthright boxed set. Rectifying this omission, Naval Battle Rules brings would-be rulers back up to speed". He notes that "As one would expect the rules are detailed and comprehensive, and mesh well with the existing land combat system. They also expand Birthright into an exciting new area - whether for seafaring, adventuring or ocean-bound conquest - offering a great deal of potential for both players and referees alike." Comford concludes his review by stating: "But these rules are not new. Cities of the Sun was an early Birthright boxed set which contained everything here and info on the lands of the Khinasi, in much the same way as The Rjurik Highlands [...] described that area of the Birthright world, and it was [less expensive]. It's difficult to recommend Naval Battle Rules when, for [a higher price], you can get the same rules and war cards, plus a detailed look at an interesting area of the Birthright world."
