= Jim Crabtree =

Artist

- Illustrations of fantasy rogues, 1999
- Known for: Fantasy art

James A. Crabtree is an American artist whose work has appeared in fantasy role-playing games (RPGs) and related materials.

== Career ==
Jim Crabtree attended the University of California, where he was a member of a game club attended by several other students who would become RPG writers and artists.

After graduation, Crabtree's first artistic credit was for the interior art of Hawkmoon (Chaosium, 1986). He then worked as an illustrator for TSR, producing black-and-white line drawings for Dragon as well as interior art for popular supplements like Night Howlers (1992), House of Strahd (1993), The Complete Book of Gnomes & Halflings (1994), Windriders of the Jagged Cliffs (1995), Den of Thieves (1996), The Illithiad (1998), and the second edition of Dark Sun.

Crabtree also provided art for several other game companies, including White Wolf (The Book of Shadows, 1993; and Digital Web, 1993); Iron Crown Enterprises (Spell Law, 3rd edition 1995), and Pinnacle Entertainment Group (Deadlands: Hell on Earth, 1998; and Deadlands Reloaded!, 2006).

Crabtree was featured in a special article in Issue 256 of Dragon titled "Rogues", which displayed 14 of Crabtree's portraits of rogue-like characters with the note, "When it comes to drawing rogues, Jim Crabtree feels he has an advantage. Many of the characters you see here came from sketches made at conventions and embellished with touches from characters in his own game."
