= Colin McComb =

American writer and game designer

Colin McComb (born May 1970) is an American writer and game designer, who is best known for his work designing the Planescape setting for the Dungeons & Dragons role-playing game, and as the creative lead for the role-playing video game Torment: Tides of Numenera. He is the co-founder of 3lb Games, a virtual reality gaming studio.

== Career history ==
Immediately after his commencement, McComb took at a job at TSR, Inc., where he produced numerous role-playing game supplements and magazine articles relating to those games. He won an Origins Award for Best Game Adventure in 1993 for Dragon Mountain, and another for New Role-Playing Supplement for the Birthright Campaign Setting in 1995. He is primarily known for his work on the Planescape line, for which he and Monte Cook were the primary designers after the departure of David "Zeb" Cook from TSR.

In 1996, McComb left TSR to take a job at Interplay Entertainment's roleplaying division, later called Black Isle Studios. While there, he had a small role in the design of Fallout 2 and a far more significant role in the design of Planescape: Torment. McComb left Black Isle in 2000, and moved to Detroit, Michigan with Jack Off Jill bassist Robin Moulder, who would become his wife in 2001. Together, they founded 3lb Games in 2008.

In addition to his gaming work, McComb contributed interviews, album reviews, and concert reviews to the underground magazine Outburn. In 2004, he reunited with his Planescape cohorts in the Malhavoc Press book, Beyond Countless Doorways, which received an Honorable Mention for Best Writing at the 2005 ENnie Awards. He and his wife also designed and wrote the manual for the MMORPG RYL in 2005.

McComb taught at the International Academy of Design and Technology.

On August 10, 2012, it was announced that McComb joined Wasteland 2 team as writer, reuniting with his Planescape cohorts once again.

McComb was the creative lead for inXile's 2017 RPG Torment: Tides of Numenera.

McComb works for the game studio Drop Bear Bytes as the Creative Lead on their upcoming title Broken Roads, an RPG set in a post-apocalyptic Australia.

== Notable work ==
=== TSR ===
- Advanced Dungeons & Dragons
  - The Complete Book of Elves
  - Dragon Mountain
- Amazing Engine
  - The Galactos Barrier
  - Bughunter (additional design)
- Birthright
  - Birthright Campaign Setting, with Richard Baker
  - Player's Secrets of Endier
  - Sword and Crown
- Dark Sun
  - The Complete Gladiators' Handbook
- Dragonlance
  - Taladas: The Minotaurs
  - Knight's Sword
  - Tales of the Lance
- Dungeons & Dragons
  - Thunder Rift
- Planescape
  - Planescape Campaign Setting (monster design)
  - Planes of Law
  - Planes of Conflict
  - Players Primer to the Outlands (Audio CD script)
  - Well of Worlds
  - Hellbound: The Blood War
  - On Hallowed Ground
  - Faces of Evil: The Fiends
  - The Great Modron March
- Ravenloft
  - Islands of Terror
  - Howls in the Night
  - Ravenloft Monstrous Compendium III: Creatures of Darkness (additional design)
  - Masque of the Red Death and Other Tales

=== Black Isle Studios ===
- Fallout 2
- Planescape: Torment
- Red Asphalt (in-game commercial scripting)

=== inXile Entertainment ===
- Wasteland 2
- Torment: Tides of Numenera
