= Player's Secrets of Baruk-Azhik =

1996 role-playing game accessory

- Genre: Role-playing games
- Publisher: TSR
- Publication date: 1996

Player's Secrets of Baruk-Azhik is an accessory for the 2nd edition of the Advanced Dungeons & Dragons fantasy role-playing game, published in 1996.

== Contents ==
Player's Secrets of Baruk-Azhik is a supplement for the Birthright campaign setting, which focuses on the dwarven domain of Baruk-Azhik, located in the Iron Peaks. The player character is an Overthane who has just been appointed, and now has access to the valuable minerals, gemstones, and Moraskorr ore of the dwarves. The dwarves here are under a constant threat from both of the nearby awnshegh known as the Gorgon and the Chimaera, and another creature rumored to be trapped in a north-western province. A horde of orogs continues to expand beneath the settlements of the dwarves and are an overwhelming army too great for the dwarves to fight alone. The book describes all parts of dwarven life, and includes a brief history of the dwarves as well as their culture and guilds.

== Publication history ==
Player's Secrets of Baruk-Azhik was published by TSR, Inc. in 1996.

== Reception ==
David Comford reviewed Player's Secrets of Baruk-Azhik for Arcane magazine, rating it a 9 out of 10 overall. He called Baruk-Azhik "a great volume", observing that unlike the "other Secrets volumes, the adventure hooks provided are original and exciting. As an alien race, the dwarves are not fully understood by the humans that border their lands, and the plots described play on this. In common with the other volumes, though, the layout, artwork and general presentation is excellent." Comford concludes his review by stating that for the price, "this is an essential guide to not only the dwarven realm, but also the dwarven people".
