= Player's Secrets of Roesone =

Role-playing game supplement

- Genre: Role-playing game
- Publisher: TSR
- Media type: Print

Player's Secrets of Roesone is a supplement to the 2nd edition of the Advanced Dungeons & Dragons fantasy role-playing game.

== Contents ==
Player's Secrets of Roesone is a sourcebook for the Birthright campaign setting, part of the "Player's Secrets" line.

== Publication history ==
Player's Secrets of Roesone was published by TSR, Inc. in 1995.

== Reception ==
Cliff Ramshaw reviewed Player's Secrets of Roesone for Arcane magazine, rating it a 7 out of 10 overall. He finds suited "for the warlike character is Roesone, a state recently carved out from bandit lands. Baron Tael to the north reckons one of your provinces ought to belong to him; the Count of said province agrees." Ramshaw comments on the series at a whole, that "these sourcebooks are a bit overpriced and some of the history behind the domains is hackneyed or tedious. But all the sourcebooks help you to create believable worlds, with enough conflicting agencies to create strong and imaginative plotlines for years to come."
