= The Bestiary =

1998 role-playing game

The Bestiary is a role-playing game supplement published by TSR in 1998 for the campaign setting Dragonlance: Fifth Age using the SAGA System of rules.

== Contents ==
The Bestiary is a book of monsters written in the voice of fictional adventurer Caramon Majere. Further commentary is provided by fictional scholar Bertram the Aesthetic.

== Publication history ==
In 1984, TSR moved away from Greyhawk, their original campaign setting for the fantasy role-playing game Dungeons & Dragons by publishing the first adventures and companion novels for the world of Dragonlance. But after twenty years, TSR had ceased to publish any Dragonlance products. Seeking to revive the setting, TSR published Dragonlance: The Fifth Age in 1996, using the SAGA System of "fate cards" rather than second edition of D&D rules. Two years later, Stan! designed The Bestiary as a supplement, with artwork by Rebecca Mitchell and Matthew Mitchell. It was published in September 1998.

== Reception ==
Writing for SF Site, Don Bassingthwaite commented, "Simply put, this is a really good book. No, let me rephrase that -- this is a really, really good book." Bassingthwaite noted "this is the type of product that has the potential to degenerate into lists of names and numbers really fast. Guess what? It doesn't! The Bestiary is very well written and beautifully illustrated. The numbers and game stats are -- hallelujah! -- secondary to descriptive text." He concluded, "The Bestiary is the best game product I've seen this year. The layout is good, the writing is fantastic, the art is great -- and most importantly, it's a useful game product. If you play Dragonlance: Fifth Age, I don't see how you can get along without this."

In Issue 12 of the French RPG magazine Backstab, Michaël Croitoriu liked the artwork, saying, "the latest addition to the [Dragonlance: 5th Age] range is absolutely beautiful. The illustrators had a blast. The 230 pages of the supplement are certainly the best TSR has done in a long time." However Croitoriu was not excited by the writing style or content, noting, "let's make no mistake, the main interest of this work remains the superb illustrations as well as the SAGA characteristics." Croitoriu concluded by giving this book a below average rating of 5 out of 10.

In Issue 118 of the French games magazine Casus Belli, Pierre Rosenthal complimented the interior art of Rebecca Guay, writing, "The magnificent wash drawings and the layout are reminiscent of the fantastic bestiaries of the Middle Ages. The text, mixing legends, real-life stories and hearsay, leaves room for dreams. A success!

== Awards ==
- At the 1998 Origins Awards, The Bestiary won in the category "Best Graphic Presentation of a Roleplaying Game, Adventure, or Supplement."
