= Player's Secrets of Tuornen =

Tabletop role-playing game supplement

- Genre: Role-playing game
- Publisher: TSR
- Media type: Print

Player's Secrets of Tuornen is a supplement to the 2nd edition of the Advanced Dungeons & Dragons fantasy role-playing game.

== Contents ==
Player's Secrets of Tuornen is a sourcebook for the Birthright campaign setting, part of the "Player's Secrets" line.

== Publication history ==
Player's Secrets of Tuornen was published by TSR, Inc. in 1995.

== Reception ==
Cliff Ramshaw reviewed Player's Secrets of Tuornen for Arcane magazine, rating it an 8 out of 10 overall. He comments that "The domain of Tuornen is suited to a warrior PC. Two rival neighbouring lords are vying for your loyalty; to the north is the lair of the vicious Rhuobhe Manslayer; and, worst of all, the court toymaker is a covert operative for a rival power..." Ramshaw comments on the series at a whole, that "these sourcebooks are a bit overpriced and some of the history behind the domains is hackneyed or tedious. But all the sourcebooks help you to create believable worlds, with enough conflicting agencies to create strong and imaginative plotlines for years to come."
