= Player's Secrets of Halskapa =

1996 role-playing game accessory

- Genre: Role-playing games
- Publisher: TSR
- Publication date: 1996

Player's Secrets of Halskapa is an accessory for the 2nd edition of the Advanced Dungeons & Dragons fantasy role-playing game, published in 1996.

== Contents ==
Player's Secrets of Halskapa is a supplement for the Birthright campaign setting, which focuses on Halskapa, the most powerful realm of the Rjurik highlands. Halskapa was once united under King Bervinig, but is now on the verge of civil war. Halskapa is sought after by many regents, with the political infighting affecting the security of its magic sources and trade center.

== Publication history ==
Player's Secrets of Halskapa was published by TSR, Inc. in 1996.

== Reception ==
David Comford reviewed Player's Secrets of Halskapa for Arcane magazine, rating it a 6 out of 10 overall. He comments that "Halskapa is a personification of the growing internal conflict and turmoil facing the Rjurik people." Disappointed by the focus of the book, he states: "Heralded as the most important of the Rjurik realms, this domain needs more than a mere booklet focusing on the political strife to the detriment of all else." Comford concludes his review by saying, "If you are planning to run a struggle-for-power campaign, then this supplement contains vital information on the major NPCs and a couple of well-presented maps. As a supplement forcus on the Halskapa realm, however, it's merely a useful series of notes and maps."
