= Last Communion =

1981 novel by Nicholas Yermakov

- Author: Nicholas Yermakov
- Language: English
- Publication date: 1981

Last Communion is a science fiction novel by American writer Nicholas Yermakov, first published in 1981.

== Plot summary ==
Last Communion is a novel in which an alien invades a human mind.

== Reception ==
Greg Costikyan reviewed Last Communion in Ares Magazine #12 and commented that "Last Communion is not a bad novel, but a disappointing one. Yermakov remains an author to keep an eye on."

== Reviews ==
- Review by Tom Staicar (1982) in Amazing Science Fiction Stories, March 1982
- Review by Tom Easton (1982) in Analog Science Fiction/Science Fact, March 1, 1982
- Review [French] by Stéphane Nicot? (1984) in Fiction, #357
