= Birthright: The Gorgon's Alliance =

1997 video game

- Developer: Synergistic Software
- Publisher: Sierra On-Line
- Designers: Robert C. Clardy; Kirt Lemons
- Programmers: Alan B. Clark; Greg Hightower; Gary Powell
- Artist: Kirt Lemons
- Composers: Christopher Barker; Craig Utterback
- Series: Birthright
- Platforms: MS-DOS, Windows
- Release: NA: July 31, 1997; EU: 1997
- Genres: Turn-based strategy, turn-based tactics
- Mode: Single-player

Birthright: The Gorgon's Alliance is a 1997 strategy video game developed by Synergistic Software and distributed by Sierra On-Line. The game is based on the Birthright campaign setting for Dungeons & Dragons and was released for MS-DOS and Microsoft Windows.

== Plot ==
Birthright: The Gorgon's Alliance is a turn-based strategy game where the player is part of a royal bloodline and one of the heirs to a throne, with the goal to take over the world. Players take on the role of ruler, or regent as they are called in Birthright, of a nation in the Land of Anuire on the continent of Cerilia. The objective of the game is to gather power and influence while the other regents try the same. In order to accomplish this objective, the player may use warfare, diplomacy, magic, manipulation of holdings such as guilds and temples, the establishment of trade routes. All of these actions take place in a turn based fashion on the world map, with the exception of the adventuring, which is done in real time 3D.

== Gameplay ==
The adventure game engine was a Doom engine clone: a 2D/3D engine which has essentially a flat layout map which used three resolutions of avatars that were hot swapped in depending on the distance from the viewer and the amount of memory on the hardware. Also there were flying wyverns and spiders which crawled on the ceilings as well as the floors. However, during gameplay, if the player failed to equip their spell caster with the necessary spells before adventuring those spells were unavailable to them and forced the player to leave and re-equip.

Map view

There was also a battle component to the game. When armies met on the world map, the player could choose to let the computer roll dice to determine the outcome based on the characters' attributes, or the player could enter a battlefield. The battles were real time and fought on a grid that was copied from the paper game. The game engine used the same engine as the adventure game, the battlefield being essentially one large room. The sprites were used to represent the unit's health. As the unit was wounded, the sprites were "killed" off until it was destroyed or a dice roll forced them to flee the field. The defending army would get to pick the terrain type. There were fields, marshes, woods and mountainous terrain. An elf army would get a bonus for fighting in woods, dwarves get a bonus for the mountains. There were some obstacles like water or trees through which the army could not advance or lost its charge bonus.

In order to win the game, a certain amount (depending on difficulty level) of (game) points were required to be collected, for example by taking control of territories allied to or belonging to the Gorgon. There were a number of ways to win the game.

== Reception ==
Reception

Review scores
Publication	Score
Computer Gaming World	3/5
PC Gamer (US)	68%
Computer Games Strategy Plus	3.5/5

Keith Sullivan for PC Gamer US argued that Birthright features all characteristics of a classic strategy game. He found its strategy elements to be "amazingly detailed", but criticized them for lacking clear documentation, and he called the role-playing section Birthright's "weakest portion". In Computer Gaming World, Gavin Hachiya Wasserman echoed Sullivan's complaint, writing that the game has "great potential" that goes unrealized. He criticized its "low production values" and "daunting micro-management", and summarized it as a product for "hard-core fans of AD&D" only.

Peter Smith of Computer Games Strategy Plus called Birthright "a challenging game to love" and that it takes time and effort to adjust it regarding its difficulty. He considered the game "a product on store shelves [that is] still in development", but praised the ambition of its designer Bob Clardy, who he compared to Gary Grigsby and Norm Koger.

According to GameSpy in 2004, "players justifiably ignored Birthright: Gorgon's Alliance, which eventually sunk into well-deserved obscurity".
