= Legends of the Hero-Kings =

Dungeons & Dragons adventure module

- Genre: Role-playing games
- Publisher: TSR
- Publication date: 1996

Legends of the Hero-Kings is an adventure module for the 2nd edition of the Advanced Dungeons & Dragons fantasy role-playing game, published in 1996.

== Plot summary ==
The Legends of the Hero-Kings is a book which presents various ideas for adventures built upon each of the random events from the rulebook in the Birthright Campaign Setting, and including plots such as discrediting a player character regent or an ancient evil awakening, each one requiring the characters to become involved personally instead of having someone else deal with the situation, and each one tailored to fit with a specific strength of adventurer.

== Publication history ==
Legends of the Hero-Kings was published by TSR, Inc. in 1996.

== Reception ==
David Comford reviewed The Legends of the Hero-Kings for Arcane magazine, rating it a 7 out of 10 overall. He commented that "Random events in Birthright represent the reality of ruling a domain - from annoying attendances at weddings to deadly assassination attempts. After an epic campaign though, these events are most easily resolved through a little thought and a roll of a D6 rather than outright adventuring. When you have escaped death umpteen times while stealing a magical artefact from some bug-eyed beastie, the drive to ride off and sort out the reason for a poor harvest is pretty low to say the least, and so it is far easier to hand the matter over to a trusted non-player character. [...] But what if that character suddenly turns traitor on you? What if the poor harvest was the herald of something far nastier?" Comford stated that "As with all campaign-aiding supplements this volume takes the pressure away from refs by supplying easily implemented scenario templates - and for the most part they are of a good quality with each adding a degree of excitement and a twist of plot into the headaches of rulership. Petty court squabbles can result in a courtier civil war if not handled carefully, forgotten heirs return to haunt a player regent and ambitious awenshegh scheme to steal the players' bloodlines." He continued: "The majority of these plots can be played after a campaign as a 'meanwhile at home' scenario, or in between linked adventures to add that extra complication or test for the players to rise to the next sought after level, If you're in between campaigns there are a couple of epics available as well." He added: "As an adventuring aid Legends is hardly a required read - but it is an extremely useful one and does display some interesting ideas, not the least of which is an appendix directed at those regents who have become near all-conquering in Cecilia and simply dispatch private armies to sort out any kind of unrest in lieu of attending themselves." Comford concluded his review by saying "Unfortunately, the presentation is rather disappointing with an extremely varied quality of artwork, however the general layout is easily followed and methodical. It's by no means an essential release, but The Legends of the Hero-Kings is useful and at times inspiring for future adventures."
