= Player's Secrets of Medoere =

Role-playing game supplement

- Genre: Role-playing game
- Publisher: TSR
- Media type: Print

Player's Secrets of Medoere is a supplement to the 2nd edition of the Advanced Dungeons & Dragons fantasy role-playing game.

== Contents ==
Player's Secrets of Medoere is a sourcebook for the Birthright campaign setting, part of the "Player's Secrets" line.

== Publication history ==
Player's Secrets of Medoere was published by TSR, Inc. in 1996.

== Reception ==
Cliff Ramshaw reviewed Player's Secrets of Medoere for Arcane magazine, rating it an 8 out of 10 overall. He commented: "Clerics get a look in with Medoere, where the ruler should be of lawful-goodish alignment. The province awaits a champion; the ruler has a +5 Holy Avenger to give away. Some DM intervention is called for." Ramshaw comments on the series at a whole, that "these sourcebooks are a bit overpriced and some of the history behind the domains is hackneyed or tedious. But all the sourcebooks help you to create believable worlds, with enough conflicting agencies to create strong and imaginative plotlines for years to come."
