= Death Ascendant =

Death Ascendant is an adventure for the 2nd edition of the Advanced Dungeons & Dragons fantasy role-playing game.

== Plot summary ==
Death Ascendant is an adventure that takes place in the less civilized realm of Darkon, one of the domains of Ravenloft. The player characters come to Nartok, where public hanging and child-branding have become commonplace, and learn that a secret war is happening there between two sets of spies. The characters are warned about this goal by way of the fortune-telling Vistani using their Tarroka, and then rumors of war along with a new type of zombie push them to the location they seek; upon arriving, the characters are must resolve the crisis in Nartok.

== Publication history ==
Death Ascendant was published by TSR in 1996, and was designed by Lisa Smedman, with cover art by Fred Fields and interior art by John Dollar.

Death Unchained was episode 1 of the Grim Harvest trilogy, and Death Ascendant is episode 2.

== Reception ==
Trenton Webb reviewed Death Ascendant for Arcane magazine, rating it an 8 out of 10 overall. Webb felt that the "wheels-within-wheels" premise of Ravenloft's secret societies is what links Death Unchained to this adventure. While he felt that Death Ascendant could work as a stand-alone feature, "this would be a waste" because the "continuity of the plot makes Ascendant far more satisfying as a sequel". He warns that with "a vast abbey as the central location and a less convincing climax than Unchained, players need to bring recent histories to bear in order to get the most out of Ascendant. If they've fought their way through the first installment they won't care about the slightly silly resolution." Webb concludes the review by saying: "An excellent sequel, Ascendant perfectly continues the events set in motion in Unchained. But they do need to be played in sequence if the full effect of this series is to be enjoyed."
