= Sword and Crown =

- Authors: Colin McComb
- First published: 1995

Sword and Crown is an adventure module of the Birthight Campaign Setting in the 2nd edition of the Advanced Dungeons & Dragons fantasy role-playing game. It was published in 1995 by TSR, Inc. (now Wizards of the Coast, a subsidiary of Hasbro). The module is for characters of levels 5–7.

== Plot summary ==
Sword and Crown is an adventure in which the player characters become involved with a major political incident. As the leaders of Anuire are conducting a meeting in the realm of a regent player character (PC), soldiers bearing the livery of one of these leading noble houses kidnap the daughter of a rival house. Since this happens in the realm of a PC, that PC and their friends must arbitrate between the feuding houses and find a way to track the kidnappers and rescue the princess, accompanied by knights serving the rival houses and soldiers from the retinue of the PC regent. The PCs encounter half-dead kidnappers eager to confess, so the PCs soon track down the perpetrator and discover the truth. When the PCs return with the princess, they must once again arbitrate between the two noble houses, although regardless of the outcome, the PCs will have the enmity of one of the houses.

Sword and Crown involves the search for a lost princess, as the player characters go from elven laboratories to slave pens to fungus lakes, and face off against an adversary called the Spiritrender.

=== Notable nonplayer characters ===
- Aubrae Avan Anuireaen mage 2
- Aeric Boeruine Anuireaen fighter 12
- Prince Darien Avan Anuireaen fighter 9

== Publication history ==
Sword and Crown is an Advanced Dungeons & Dragons game adventure module for the Birthright setting, published by TSR, Inc., featuring a 64-page softcover book, and one 21’x 32’ map sheet. Sword and Crown was the first adventure published by TSR for the Birthright campaign world. The adventure was designed by Colin McComb and edited by Anne Brown, with cover art by Tony Szczudlo and illustrations by Ben Otero and John Dollar.

== Reception ==
Cliff Ramshaw reviewed Sword and Crown for Arcane magazine, rating it a 6 out of 10 overall. Ramshaw comments that "with a party this size things can become unwieldy, and the author suggests you use Birthright skirmish rules to resolve large-scale combats". He notes that the adventure is "all fairly straightforward to referee until the closing scene" as it is "suggested that a trial takes place, but no mechanism is provided", and the fact that "the players will earn the enmity of one or the other of the noble houses [...] seems a trifle unfair, but I guess that's just the risks of power politics".

Rick Swan reviewed Sword and Crown along with several other Birthright products for Dragon magazine #233 (September 1996), giving it a rating of 4 out of 6. Swan called this a first-rate example of an official adventure, "where the design team takes you by the hand and shows you what they consider the essentials of a Birthright campaign". He also called Sword and Crown "well-organized, clutter-free, and easy on the brain", and referred to the Spiritrender an "exceptionally nasty adversary". Swan felt that Colin McComb, co-designer of the original Birthright rules, "supplies plenty of staging tips and helpful NPCs — too helpful, some might say", noting that a bandit conveniently volunteers too much information about his family at one point. He admitted that the adventure doesn't break any new ground, and relies on AD&D conventions rather than concepts unique to the Birthright setting, so that the adventure acts as a bridge "intended to ease the transition from standard AD&D to the more sophisticated Birthright setting". Swan recommended that, for a beginner on a budget looking to buy a Birthright adventure, to "go with Sword and Crown if you can't make up your mind", but that seasoned Birthright players who already have a campaign underway can skip the adventure.
