= The Book of Magecraft =

Tabletop role-playing game supplement

- Genre: Role-playing games
- Publisher: TSR
- Publication date: 1996

The Book of Magecraft is an accessory for the 2nd edition of the Advanced Dungeons & Dragons fantasy role-playing game, published in 1996.

== Contents ==
The Book of Magecraft covers the magic using classes of the Birthright setting: the magician class which specializes in divination and illusion magic and can only cast low-level spells of other types, and the wizard class for which a character must be blooded but is otherwise like the standard mage class. The book also deals with War Magic, a type of spellcasting particular to Birthright which uses War Cards to participate in large battles; the book presents rules on how to create War Magic versions of ordinary spells. The book also presents Realm Magic, which a regent wizard can collect from sources where the magical energy of the land of Cerilia accumulates in pockets. The Book of Magecraft also covers rules for discovering, utilizing, and borrowing source created by regent wizards and ley lines, which a wizard can create and maintain to tap energy from sources. The book details the magician character class, and provides character kits for the class. Additionally, the book includes a selection of Realm, Battle, and standard spells intended to be used for the Birthright, and also describes the Royal College of Sorcery, a list of magic items and artifacts specific to the setting, and details about a group of legendary creatures who are believed to give boons to wizards.

== Publication history ==
The Book of Magecraft was published by TSR, Inc. in 1996.

== Reception ==
Cliff Ramshaw reviewed The Book of Magecraft for Arcane magazine, rating it a 7 out of 10 overall. He comments on the War Spells: "Given the power of these spells, you can see why the rules emphasise the rarity of true wizards. Although casting fireballs willy nilly into a battlefield is great fun, it's a little unbalanced – a fighter of a similar level couldn't have as significant an effect." He calls the new spells in the book "varied and imaginative", the Royal College of Sorcery "intriguing", and the legendary creatures "seemingly tagged-on". Ramshaw concludes the review by stating: "It's a fairly solid accessory, though perhaps not as inspiring as it could be. Ordinary magic users will profit from its good selection of spells, while regent wizards will find it almost indispensable."

== Reviews ==
- Dragon #233
- Casus Belli #94
