= The Sword of Roele =

D&D module

- Genre: Role-playing games
- Publisher: TSR
- Publication date: 1996

The Sword of Roele is an adventure module for the 2nd edition of the Advanced Dungeons & Dragons fantasy role-playing game, published in 1996.

== Plot summary ==
The Sword of Roele is an adventure in which the Three Brother Mages, enemies of the powerful creature known as the Chimera, claim to know where to find the legendary Sword of Roele, and intend to obtain it. Secretly they are after something else, but they send the player characters to the supposed location of the sword to find and bring back their true prize. The Chimera also wants the adventurers to find the sword, so she can discover what the Brothers are actually trying to find. Unknown to all involved, the sword was supposed to have been secured within the hoard of another powerful creature, the Gorgon, but was placed where the Brothers sent the adventurers by a mischievous mysterious third party. The location the adventurers ultimately arrive in is a tomb for paladins who served in the ancient Order of the Sun; the architect hired by the priests of the Order was secretly a disguised necromancer who intended to use the tomb when he returned as a lich.

== Publication history ==
The Sword of Roele was written by Wolfgang Baur, and published by TSR in 1996. Doug Stewart was the editor. Cover art was by Albert Slark, with interior art by Nick Choles.

== Reception ==
Cliff Ramshaw reviewed The Sword of Roele for Arcane magazine, rating it a 4 out of 10 overall. He commented, "It's a convoluted one, this." He noted that the designers added the plot twist of the necromancer to improve what would otherwise be a "pretty dull experience" of grave robbing a lawful-good tomb, but was also critical of this plot point: "Casting detect evil on the builder of the resting place for all their souls must have seemed like such a chore for the commissioning priests." Ramshaw concluded the review by stating, "It's not only convoluted, it's confusing and doesn't really hang together. Bit of a disappointment."
