= Non-Player Character Records =

- Author: Harold Johnson
- Genre: Role-playing game
- Publisher: TSR
- Publication date: 1979
- Pages: 32

Non-Player Character Records is an accessory for the Dungeons & Dragons fantasy role-playing game.

== Contents ==
Non-Player Character Records is a Dungeon Master's aid containing 32 character sheets for non-player characters, intended for first edition Advanced Dungeons & Dragons rules.

== Publication history ==
Non-Player Character Records was designed by Harold Johnson, with a cover by Erol Otus, and was published by TSR in 1979 as a 32-page booklet.
