= Greatheart (McKeone novel) =

Greatheart is a fantasy novel by Dixie Lee McKeone, set in the world of Birthright, and based on the Dungeons & Dragons game.

== Plot summary ==
Greatheart is a novel in which a human named Greatheart, who was raised by elves, must protect a sacred grove.

== Reviews ==
- Kliatt
- Backstab #7
