= Permanent Character Folder & Adventure Records =

- Author: Harold Johnson
- Genre: Role-playing game
- Publisher: TSR
- Publication date: 1979
- Pages: 32

Permanent Character Folder & Adventure Records is an accessory for the Dungeons & Dragons fantasy role-playing game.

== Contents ==
Permanent Character Record is an accessory for players of the first edition AD&D rules, which consisted of a folder to contain various character statistics and information, and included record sheets to help the player track events that their player character was involved in.

== Publication history ==
Permanent Character Record was designed by Harold Johnson, with a cover by Erol Otus, and was published by TSR in 1979 as a 32-page booklet with an outer folder.
