= Dungeon Masters Adventure Log =

1980 role-playing game accessory

- Author: Lawrence Schick (editor)
- Genre: Role-playing game
- Publisher: TSR
- Publication date: 1980
- Pages: 52

Dungeon Masters Adventure Log is an accessory for the Dungeons & Dragons fantasy role-playing game.

== Contents ==
Dungeon Masters Adventure Log is a supplement for the Dungeon Master containing important tables which were not included on the original Dungeon Masters Screen, as well as pages of blank forms to help keep track of characters and events as they occur in game sessions.

The Dungeon Masters Adventure Log uses two different formats for its record sheets. The Dungeon Master can use these sheets for keeping track of characters and any special abilities they have, and can also use them to record information they want to access, including what monsters the characters encounter, any treasure they obtain, and what order they march in. The front of the book provides abbreviations for help with consistency. The book also includes sections detailing such things as modifiers to die rolls in combat, rolls for surprise and reactions, how to avoid encounters, and values for experience point awards.

== Publication history ==
Dungeon Masters Adventure Log was edited by Lawrence Schick, with a cover by Erol Otus, and was published by TSR in 1980 as a 52-page book.

== Reception ==
Elisabeth Barrington reviewed the supplement in The Space Gamer No. 33. She commented that "All of these tables take up only a few pages at the beginning and end. The rest of the book consists of record sheets. Each page has both types facing each other. There is no flipping back and forth from page to page to find something. The printing is in bold, simply type; no fancy scripts clutter up the page, so the sheets are very easy to read. Plenty of space is provided for almost anything you want to record somewhere. In the centre of the book are illustrations of various types of armour and some of the more unusual weapons (thus allowing the DM to show a picture of a weapon to a player who is not familiar with it)." She added: "If there is something left out of the book, we haven't found what it is yet. The only problem is the holes punched in the book (for ring binders). They take out some of the space for writing, just where you needed to squeeze in one more word." Barrington concluded her review by saying, "The DM Adventure Log is an excellent aid for many FRP systems. The simplicity is so complete that DMs will find themselves discarding the sheaf of papers they presently use to record all this information."
