= Player's Secrets of Ariya =

- Genre: Role-playing games
- Publisher: TSR
- Publication date: 1995

Player's Secrets of Ariya is an accessory for the 2nd edition of the Advanced Dungeons & Dragons fantasy role-playing game, published in 1995.

== Contents ==
Player's Secrets of Ariya is a sourcebook for Birthright that describes Ariya, a theocratic domain on the south coast of Khinasi.

== Publication history ==
Player's Secrets of Ariya was published by TSR, Inc. in 1995.

== Reception ==
Cliff Ramshaw reviewed Player's Secrets of Ariya for Arcane magazine, rating it a 7 out of 10 overall. He described Ariya as a "sun-kissed domain" that is "exceptional if only because rather than yet another variation on Northern European feudalism it's an altogether more romantic, magical and unfamiliar place - one that owes much to the Arabian Nights". Ramshaw felt that the domain of Ariya is "imbued with spicy richness", he felt that the plot hooks were "somewhat ordinary", saying: "They're not bad, just not as imaginative as the setting itself. Still, there's plenty here to get a good referee improvising."
