= Player's Secrets of Tuarhievel =

Tabletop role-playing game supplement

- Cover
- Genre: Role-playing game
- Publisher: TSR
- Media type: Print

Player's Secrets of Tuarhievel is a supplement to the 2nd edition of the Advanced Dungeons & Dragons fantasy role-playing game.

== Contents ==
Player's Secrets of Tuarhievel is a supplement which focuses on the elves of Cerilia who once ruled the entire continent, as this magical race has a long-held animosity and hopes for retribution against the humans who encroach on their forest refuge while the fiery Gorgon looms nearby.

== Publication history ==
Player's Secrets of Tuarhievel was published by TSR, Inc. in 1996.

== Reception ==
David Comford reviewed Player's Secrets of Tuarhievel for Arcane magazine, rating it a 9 out of 10 overall. He stated that "Due to the vast numbers of humans on Cerilia, the majority of the Player's Secrets series have focused away from the demi-human races, The Player's Secrets of Tuarhievel, however, opens up one of the most mysterious and intriguing races on the continent to both players and referees - the elves." Comford noted that "Although presenting a hefty challenge for players and referees alike, this addition to the series is one of the best I have seen. It is quite simply an essential volume. A detailed history of relentless human exploitation of the once vast forests, and insubstantial treaties between the elves and the new settlers, opens a sourcebook that's screaming with gripping campaign scenarios." He added: "The former ruler of Tuarhievel is being held by the Gorgon and, against all tradition, his human consort has ascended the Thorn Throne and been invested with his bloodline until her unborn child is of an age to rule. With many noble houses exhibiting a genocidal hatred of all humans, the political scene has escalated to assassination attempts and a nationwide struggle for dominance. If straight hands-in-the-dirt adventuring is more your style, then a domain decimated by a magical disaster - wandering spectres of those slain in the eternal border wars, and the looming presence of the conquesting Gorgon - provides enough material for a series of campaigns." Comford concluded his review by calling the book "A great read, very well detailed and excellent value for money."

DieHard GameFan said that "It's notable how truly unique Tuarhieveln comes across, even in a game as unusual as Birthright."
