= The Iron Throne (novel) =

1995 novel by Simon Hawke

- Cover of the first edition
- Author: Simon Hawke
- Language: English
- Genre: Fantasy novel
- Published: 1995
- Publication place: United States
- Media type: Print
- ISBN: 0-7869-0357-0

The Iron Throne is a fantasy novel by Simon Hawke, set in the world of the Birthright, and based on the Dungeons & Dragons role-playing game. It is the first novel published for the setting. It was published in November, 1995.

== Plot summary ==
The Iron Throne is a novel set in a land where humans have tried to create an empire by warring with other races ever since they arrived from another continent. A bitter dispute was caused by the domination of the native elven population, and war is inevitable as the other races want to take control of the continent from the humans. The ambition for someone new to take control of the Iron Throne causes strife among the humans with a civil war brewing, while the elves form an alliance with the humans against the evil forces despite their history of animosity.

== Reception ==
Jonathan Palmer reviewed The Iron Throne for Arcane magazine, rating it a 9 out of 10 overall. He describes the novel as "a veritable saga set in a beautifully believable land where humans have vied with other races for empire since their arrival from the ancestral continent." He comments that "The author shows a good understanding of history and geography, of their effects on military campaigns and battlefield strategies, and of the fortifications and defences necessary to withstand attack and siege. Of particular interest to referees will be the impenetrable elven capital." He adds that "Even the erotica is surprisingly well-written by the usual standards of the genre: marriages of political convenience and ill-conceived romantic liaisons of inconvenience abound. There is no respite from the intrigue of court life. The reader feels as though he (or, indeed, she) is a silent servant to the court, observing all the machinations of the courtiers, but at the same time being powerless to intervene. The whole thing is made all the more credible by its generally well-developed characters (even the non-human ones)." Palmer concludes his review by stating, "It has taken a writer who lives alone with his motorcycle on an Indian Reservation in Arizona to have the patience to create such a wonderfully alive fantasy world, with a mythology and captivatingly intricate plot to match. This is a truly splendid read with hardly a weak moment from start to unpredictable end."

The Iron Throne appeared on the 2024 Game Rant "31 Best Dungeons & Dragons Novels, Ranked" list at #13.

== Reviews ==
- Review by Don D'Ammassa (1995) in Science Fiction Chronicle, #187 December 1995-January 1996
- Backstab #7
