= Player's Secrets of Endier =

Role-playing game supplement

- Genre: Role-playing game
- Publisher: TSR
- Media type: Print

Player's Secrets of Endier is a supplement to the 2nd edition of the Advanced Dungeons & Dragons fantasy role-playing game.

== Contents ==
Player's Secrets of Endier is a sourcebook for the Birthright campaign setting, part of the "Player's Secrets" line.

== Publication history ==
Player's Secrets of Endier was published by TSR, Inc. in 1995.

== Reception ==
Cliff Ramshaw reviewed Player's Secrets of Endier for Arcane magazine, rating it a 7 out of 10 overall. He comments that "The small domain of Endier is for a thief to run. Keeping its borders intact involves much diplomacy and plotting. There's an intriguing sub-plot about a riddle, sadly let down when the answer is revealed." Ramshaw comments on the series at a whole, that "these sourcebooks are a bit overpriced and some of the history behind the domains is hackneyed or tedious. But all the sourcebooks help you to create believable worlds, with enough conflicting agencies to create strong and imaginative plotlines for years to come."
