= Islands of Terror =

Dungeons & Dragons accessory book

- Genre: Role-playing games
- Publisher: TSR
- Publication date: 1992

Islands of Terror is an accessory for the 2nd edition of the Advanced Dungeons & Dragons fantasy role-playing game, published in 1992 by TSR.

== Contents ==
The Islands of Terror module is set in the Ravenloft campaign setting, adding nine new islands with evil lords, but no new information about Ravenloft itself. It is well organized, with entertaining stories, good character development, and "very good" graphics and illustrations. According to reviewer Gene Galloway, the work "primarily provides more lands in which to adventure but no adventures themselves". Floor plans of buildings and features are drawn on 10×10 grids which add to playability.

== Publication history ==
The module was published by TSR.

== Reception ==
Gene Galloway reviewed Islands of Terror in the May–June 1993 issue of White Wolf magazine, providing it a rating of 3 out of a possible 5. Galloway stated that "the strength of the stories and the depth of the background provided for the new lands is impressive, and definitely worth looking at", and thought that "Overall, Islands of Terror is good for Ravenloft and for entertainment, but not necessarily important to the game."

== Reviews ==
- Casus Belli #115
