= Doug Stewart (game designer) =

Game designer

Doug Stewart is a game designer who edited the Monstrous Manual, a compilation of monsters from the 2nd edition of the role-playing game Dungeons & Dragons. He was also a designer for RPG rulebooks The Classic Dungeons & Dragons Game, Encyclopedia Magica, and Player's Secrets of Stjordvik. He is credited as a designer on the adventure supplements Children of the Night: Ghosts and The Naval Architect's Manual, as well as the adventure paths Castle Spulzeer and Missions of State.
