= Player's Secrets of Ilien =

Role-playing game supplement

- Genre: Role-playing game
- Publisher: TSR
- Media type: Print

Player's Secrets of Ilien is a supplement to the 2nd edition of the Advanced Dungeons & Dragons fantasy role-playing game.

== Contents ==
Player's Secrets of Ilien is a sourcebook for the Birthright campaign setting, part of the "Player's Secrets" line.

== Publication history ==
Player's Secrets of Ilien was published by TSR, Inc. in 1995.

== Reception ==
Cliff Ramshaw reviewed Player's Secrets of Ilien for Arcane magazine, rating it a 6 out of 10 overall. He describes Ilien as a "weakish region, for a wizard to rule. The player inherits a stash of magical spells and items, along with a rival wizard and a shifty guildmaster who's importing arms faster than Iraq." Ramshaw comments on the series at a whole, that "these sourcebooks are a bit overpriced and some of the history behind the domains is hackneyed or tedious. But all the sourcebooks help you to create believable worlds, with enough conflicting agencies to create strong and imaginative plotlines for years to come."
