= Destiny Deck =

Destiny Deck was published in 1990 by Stellar Games as an aid for role-playing games.

== Description ==
Destiny Deck, designed by Peter T. Busch and Dennis L. McKiernan, is actually four decks of cards: Setting, Atmosphere, Challenge, and Bonus. The cards are meant to help a gamemaster invent plots for new scenarios. Each card lists a central theme, and then several variations on the theme in smaller type. A 4-page pamphlet suggests ways in which the decks can be used in the creative process.

== Reception ==
In the April 1994 edition of Dragon (Issue #204), Lester W. Smith was not impressed with the accompanying pamphlet, which he suggested "could have used a savage editing, as it is painfully inflated with a surplus of verbosity." But Smith liked the idea of the deck, saying, "as a spur to creativity, the product works pretty well."

== Awards ==
Destiny Deck won the 1993 Origins Award for Best Game Accessory.
