= Dragon Mountain (Dungeons & Dragons) =

D&D module

- Code: 1089
- Character levels: 10-15
- Authors: Colin McComb; Paul Arden Lidberg
- First published: 1993
- ISBN: 1560765984

Dragon Mountain is a deluxe boxed set adventure published in 1993 for the Dungeons & Dragons fantasy role-playing game.

== Plot summary ==
The box includes six poster-sized maps, half of which are tactical displays of village and battlefield settings, while the rest detail the three-levels of the mountain's interior. Six cardstock mini-maps show self-contained sections of the mountain that can be attached to the poster maps at various locations or simply set aside. The new Monstrous Compendium pages showcase several opponents, such as the gnasher and the brain spider.

Book One outlines the search for a map to Dragon Mountain, a plane-shifting construct that appears in a random location every couple of decades, and a magical item that will improve the party's chance of survival once they get inside. The hunt takes the player characters to a variety of sites, such as crypt of dancing wights and a snake-infested swamp. Books Two and Three lead the characters through the city-sized labyrinth of Dragon Mountain, a maze of traps, ambushes, and dead ends. The adventure concludes with a journey through foggy ruins that leads to the home of the dragon.

== Publication history ==
The Dragon Mountain set, an Advanced Dungeons & Dragons game supplement, was published by TSR, Inc. as a boxed set including three 64-page books, six 32" × 21" map sheets, eight monster sheets (in Monstrous Compendium format), 12 reference cards, 14 player-handout sheets, cardstock counter sheet, and 24 plastic bases. Design was by Paul Arden Lidberg and Colin McComb, with editing and additional design by Thomas M. Reid, with illustrations by Tony DiTerlizzi, Larry Elmore, and Jeff Easley and cover by Jennell Jaquays (Note: Credited as Paul Jaquays.).

Wizards of the Coast would later (2018) reprint Dragon Mountain as a single softcover book that did not include the plastic bases.

== Reception ==
Rick Swan reviewed Dragon Mountain for Dragon magazine #200 (December 1993). According to Swan, "Dungeon-crawlers will think they've died and gone to heaven when they visit Dragon Mountain, a city-sized labyrinth that revitalizes the AD&D game's hoariest conventions. It's a funhouse of foul-tempered monsters and convoluted traps, designed for characters with the stamina of Greek gods and an appetite for abuse. Best of all, it boasts one of the nastiest, sneakiest surprises I've ever seen in a fantasy adventure" which involves hundreds of "one of the game's most underused and underappreciated adversaries". He felt that "A project this ambitious deserves a lavish package, and the designers deliver in spades," calling the documents, diagrams, and other player handouts "fun". He compliments the designers, stating that "Paul Lidberg and Colin McComb opt for clean, no-frill prose, making it easy for the DM to track the serpentine plot. Every encounter makes sense, quite an accomplishment for a dungeon this size."

Swan felt that Book One, written by Lidberg, which was all prologue to actually reaching the Dragon Mountain, involves "a variety of interesting sites" that results in "an engaging mix of investigative and combat encounters" where the PCs "acquire key information in imaginative ways". He noted that the "cast of eccentric NPCs makes for lively role-playing" with "quirky behavior" from some of these characters, although he complains that too many non-player characters "remain cardboard cutouts, with more attention paid to their physical traits than their personalities. If we knew as much about their motivations as their eye color, Book One would’ve been more memorable." Swan complains that as the PCs "drift from one lead to the next, the obstacles become increasingly contrived", which he feels "isn't so much a problem with the writing as with the structure itself; Book One is all prologue, and prologues shouldn't take up a third of the adventure." By comparison, Swan considered that "the main event is worth the wait as Books Two and Three, both by McComb, lead us through a delightfully sadistic maze of traps, ambushes, and (literal) dead ends." He felt that Dragon Mountain "boasts a rich selection" of encounters, and "makes expert use of layered encounters, where the PCs must deal with two or more perils simultaneously." He considered "the inevitable showdown with the Queen of the Mountain" to be "somewhat of a letdown, dribbling away in unconvincing parley and an inconclusive climax. I think McComb just ran out of room; he needed another half-dozen pages or so to wrap it up in style."

Swan concluded the review by saying: "Dragon Mountain demands more of players, especially newcomers, than they may be willing to give. The relentless assault, particularly in Book Three, can become oppressive if the DM doesn't give the party a few lucky breaks. Serious-minded players may scoff at the cartoonish embellishments; this is a dungeon stocked with greased slides and bad guys called Kneebiters. The presentation has a few ragged edges: underdeveloped encounters [...] sketchy DM tips [...] and a too-long Book One. But, even at it's [sic] shakiest, Dragon Mountain rarely fails to thrill. It's a testament to the skill of the designers that they can bring a smile to your face while they're knocking your teeth out."

Dragon Mountain won the 1993 Origins Award for Best Roleplaying Adventure.
