= The Silver Key (module) =

Dungeons & Dragons adventure module

- Genre: Role-playing games
- Publisher: TSR
- Publication date: 1996

The Silver Key is an adventure module for the 2nd edition of the Advanced Dungeons & Dragons fantasy role-playing game, published in 1996.

== Plot summary ==
The Silver Key is an adventure for a party of two to six player characters of levels two to eight, in which orcs patrol the countryside as the humans of the city of Horonshar get ready for war. When the orcs ambushed a group of soldiers a few days earlier, a military officer carrying a magical item with teleportation powers called the Silver Key was taken prisoner in the orcish fortress. The player characters must be polymorphed into orcs to rescue the officer and recover the key because the orcs want to discover how it works. The adventure includes rules for players to gain "orc points" for good roleplaying as polymorphed orcs, however a character that accumulates too many orc points can stay as an orc permanently. The adventure does not provide a map for the orcish fortress, but the adventure instead uses a flow chart divided into regions which determine what encounters and information are possible, and the characters are able to move to another region using dice rolls.

== Publication history ==
The Silver Key was published by TSR, Inc. in 1996.

== Reception ==
Cliff Ramshaw reviewed The Silver Key for Arcane magazine, rating it a 6 out of 10 overall. Ramshaw felt that the "orc points" system would be fun, "but unfair on the better roleplayers". He felt that the system of moving around in the orcish fortress by flow chart and die roll was "more like Monopoly than AD&D; there's even a 'Go to jail' - sorry, 'Busted' - region. Unfortunately, this innovative method of portraying strangers' confusions in a fortress preparing for war means that players have next to little say over their own destinies. Even the two key locations here don't warrant maps." Ramshaw concluded the review by saying: "The Silver Key's originality is married by an over-reliance on the dice, its occasionally ambiguous rules, and a paucity of detail for critical locations and encounters. Experienced referees could turn it into an enjoyable jaunt; those less so should steer well clear."
