= Treasure Tales =

Supplement for Dungeons & Dragons

- Genre: Role-playing games
- Publisher: TSR
- Publication date: 1996

Treasure Tales is an accessory for the 2nd edition of the Advanced Dungeons & Dragons fantasy role-playing game, published in 1996.

== Contents ==
Treasure Tales is a collection of 16 short adventure scenarios for AD&D. Each adventure includes information for players, notes for the Dungeon Master, a map, and a picture for setting the scene. The page for the player presents the setting for the adventure along with its legends and notable characters, while the page for the DM explores each map and describes the primary enemies and which treasures are found in which locations.

== Publication history ==
Treasure Tales was published by TSR, Inc. in 1996.

== Reception ==
Trenton Webb reviewed Treasure Tales for Arcane magazine, rating it a 4 out of 10 overall. He comments that "brevity is the order of the day here. Each scenario builds upon a single simple concept, primarily a horde of cash and what the party needs to do to get hold of it. There's no room for cosmetics, so each potential adventure stands or falls solely on the strength of its core idea." He identifies "Dragon And The Lady" as the best of the 16 adventures, as it "works because it is simply a great twist on the oldest of D&D premises" and points out "The Lair of the Pirate King" as it "packs a delightful kick-yourself-for-not-spotting-it- secret", noting that scenarios such as these "are just what burnt out referees need to rekindle their imagination. Fast, to the point, and fun to run as well as play." However, he considers these the exceptions, positing that "it's obvious why so many of the hordes in Treasure Tales lay peacefully undisturbed - it's not that they are too dangerous to recover, it's just that they're far too dull to bother with. Adventures should be about heroic victory against massive odds, not gradual attrition of yet another randomly placed Lizard Man tribe." Webb concludes the review by saying: "En masse, the Treasure Tales are bland and lack subtlety. The best adventures are restricted by their necessarily potent foes, while in the lower levels there are more mapping exercises than legends waiting to happen. The good ones may prove useful for one-nighters while your Paladin's on holiday in Benidorm, but that's about the limit of Treasure Tales' appeal."

== Reviews ==
- Dragon #232
