= Warriors and Priests of the Realms =

- Genre: Role-playing games
- Publisher: TSR
- Publication date: 1996

Warriors and Priests of the Realms is an accessory for the 2nd edition of the Advanced Dungeons & Dragons fantasy role-playing game, published in 1996.

== Contents ==
Warriors and Priests of the Realms is a sourcebook presenting character kits for the Forgotten Realms setting. Each kit contains information such as ability score requirements, starting money, and proficiencies, as well as a general overview and role-playing information. The book organizes warrior kits by geography, while priest kits are organized by faith. The book also details character classes for the Harper and Crusader: Harpers are fighter-rogues who combat evil, while Crusaders are fighter-clerics who can be of any alignment.

== Publication history ==
Shannon Appelcline commented that among other changes to the Forgotten Realms publications in the 1990s, "There was also a proliferation of adventures, often laid out in trilogies, and finally a number of more player-oriented books — doubtless intended to sell like the PHBR volumes. Some of these volumes, like Wizards and Rogues of the Realms (1995) and Warriors and Priests of the Realms (1996) even shared the same trade dress."

== Reception ==
Cliff Ramshaw reviewed Warriors and Priests of the Realms for Arcane magazine, rating it a 4 out of 10 overall. He notes that while the information in the book is specific to the Forgotten Realms campaign, "it is possible to tailor everything to your own world". Ramshaw felt that the kits were "(mainly) uninspiring", and concluded the review by saying: "Really, if you're stuck for ideas on how to characterize your newly rolled fighter, then you ought to consider giving up fantasy roleplaying - it's not as if there's a shortage or archetypes to choose from. Priests are more tricky, and the priest kits definitely exhibit more imagination than their warrior counterparts. Even so, do you really want to spend this much money to flesh out one or two characters?"

== Reviews ==
- Casus Belli #92
