= Greatheart Mesa =

Mountain in Utah, United States

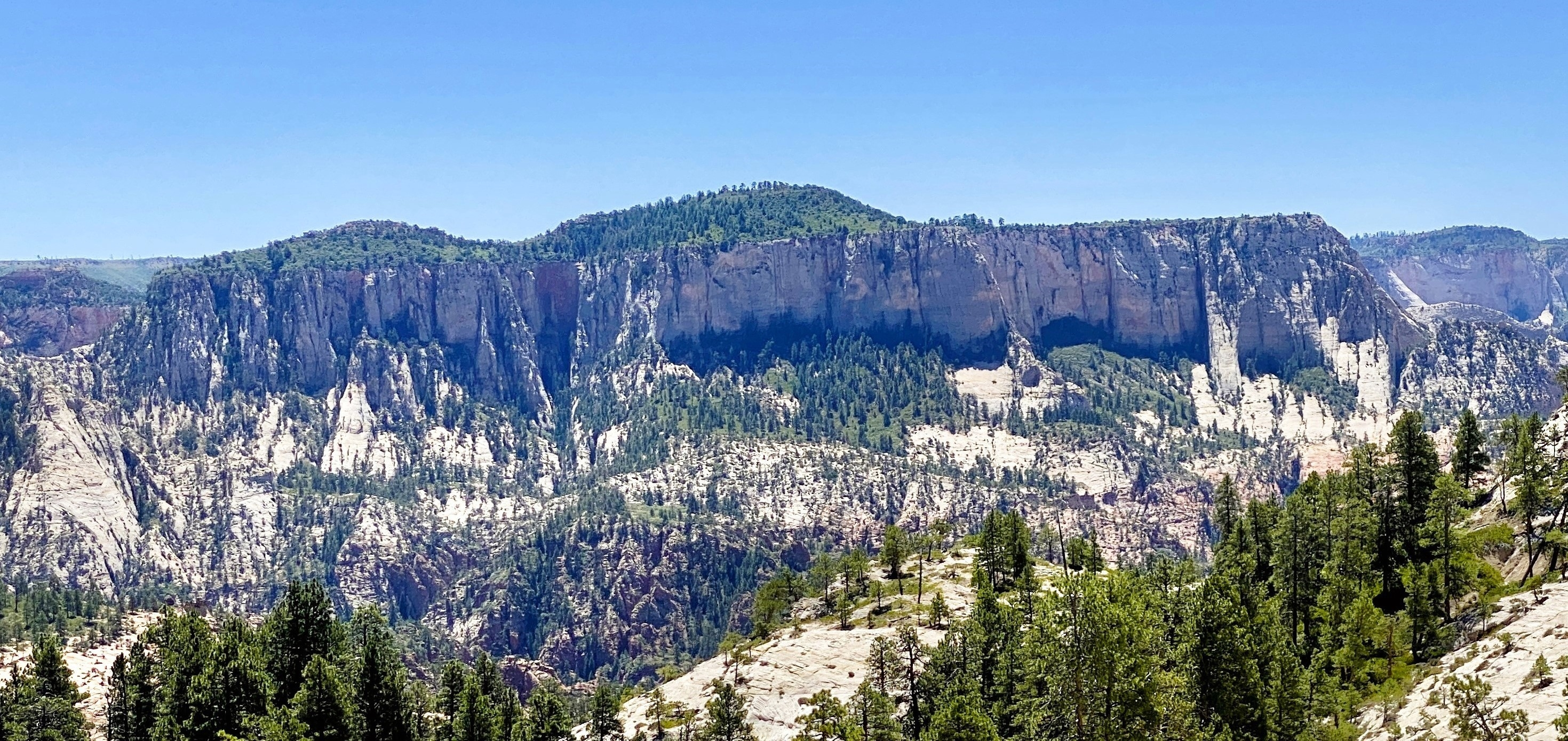
- Northwest aspect

Highest point
- Elevation: 7,405 ft (2,257 m)
- Prominence: 1,125 ft (343 m)
- Parent peak: Kolob Peak (8,933 ft)
- Isolation: 3.0 mi (4.8 km)
- Coordinates: 37°18′31″N 113°01′30″W

Geography
- Location within Utah Location within the United States
- Country: United States
- State: Utah
- County: Washington
- Protected area: Zion National Park
- Parent range: Colorado Plateau
- Topo map: USGS The Guardian Angels

Geology
- Rock age: Jurassic
- Mountain type: Mesa
- Rock type: Navajo sandstone

Climbing
- Easiest route: class 3

Greatheart Mesa is a 7,405 ft (2,257 m) summit in Washington County, Utah, United States.

== Description ==
Greatheart Mesa is located 8.5 miles (13.7 km) north of Springdale, Utah, in Zion National Park. The mesa is composed of white Navajo Sandstone with a ponderosa pine forest covering the top. The landform's toponym was officially adopted in 1935 by the U.S. Board on Geographic Names. It was so named after the heroic character named "Greatheart" in the novel The Pilgrim's Progress, and because this white-walled mesa would require a person with a stout, great heart to climb it. Precipitation runoff from this mountain drains into North Creek which is a tributary of the Virgin River.

== Climate ==
According to the Köppen climate classification system, Greatheart Mesa is located in a Cold semi-arid climate zone, which is defined by the coldest month having an average mean temperature below 32 °F (0 °C), and at least 50% of the total annual precipitation being received during the spring and summer. This desert climate receives less than 10 inches (250 millimeters) of annual rainfall, and snowfall is generally light during the winter. Spring and fall are the most favorable seasons to visit Greatheart Mesa.

== See also ==
- Geology of the Zion and Kolob canyons area
