= Necromancer (board game) =

Necromancer is a 1983 board game published by Steve Jackson Games.

== Gameplay ==
Necromancer is a game in which the players are wizards who can control the undead.

== Reception ==
Kevin Frey reviewed Necromancer in Space Gamer No. 71. Frey commented that "Overall, Necromancer is action-packed, fast-moving, and ever-changing. It is a unique game which most gamers should find exciting to play."

== Reviews ==
- 1984 Games 100
