= Player's Secrets of Binsada =

1996 role-playing game accessory

- Genre: Role-playing games
- Publisher: TSR
- Publication date: 1996

Player's Secrets of Binsada is an accessory for the 2nd edition of the Advanced Dungeons & Dragons fantasy role-playing game, published in 1996.

== Contents ==
Player's Secrets of Binsada is a supplement which details the Khinasi domain of Binsada, a matriarchal society of expansionist nomadic horse-riding clans. The main Binsadan army is made up of cavalry units. The people are preparing for a jihad because the high priest of Binsada recently had a vision involving conquest.

One of the female player characters in the campaign is the sister of the current queen using a magical turban of disguise, because the beloved queen has been overcome by an inborn form of insanity. The player character must pretend to be the queen, and decide whether to reveal the truth to her people. Powerful awnsheglien neighbor the domain of Binsada, and the supplement provides plot hooks for additional adventure ideas involving regal intrigue, dungeons to explore, and a religious war.

== Publication history ==
Player's Secrets of Binsada was published by TSR, Inc. in 1996.

== Reception ==
Cliff Ramshaw reviewed Player's Secrets of Binsada for Arcane magazine, rating it a 9 out of 10 overall. Ramshaw calls Binsada "wonderfully unique", and calls out the Binsadans as "a bit like the Mongols of old", noting that the founder of modern Binsada "is playfully named either 'Chengas Zaran' or 'Tengis Rhan'". He feels that anyone playing the ruler of Binsada "won't be bored" due to the plot hooks which provide "plenty of interest", and that players are "instructed to rule Binsada with 'unshakable confidence in the face of apparent disaster'. Sounds good to me."
