= Halfling (Dungeons & Dragons) =

Race in Dungeons & Dragons

- First appearance: the original 1974 edition of Dungeons & Dragons
- Based on: Hobbit

In-universe information
- Type: Humanoid
- Alignment: Usually Neutral

The halfling is a fictional race (with many subraces) found in the Dungeons & Dragons fantasy role-playing game. Halflings are similar in appearance to humans, but about half their size. The creature was called a "hobbit" in the earliest edition of the game, but TSR changed the name to "halfling" after the Tolkien Estate sent a cease and desist.

== Publication history ==
=== Original Dungeons & Dragons ===
The hobbit first appeared as a player character class in the original 1974 edition of Dungeons & Dragons.

In earlier editions of D&D, halflings are strongly inspired by Tolkien's hobbits (even referred to by that word frequently), being diminutive, chubby, furry-footed home-bodies with a penchant for dwelling in hollowed out hillsides and a racial talent for burglary.

The original Dungeons & Dragons included hobbits, but later the game began using the name "halfling" as an alternative to "hobbit" for legal reasons.

The Tolkien Estate sent a cease and desist to TSR that forced them to remove names such as hobbits from D&D.

=== Advanced Dungeons & Dragons ===
The "halfling" appeared as a player character race in the original Player's Handbook (1978). The halfling also appeared in the original Monster Manual (1977), which described the halfling subraces of hairfoot, stout, and tallfellow. A number of halfling subraces were presented as character races in the original Unearthed Arcana (1985).

=== Basic Dungeons & Dragons ===
The halfling appeared as a character class in the Dungeons & Dragons Basic Set (1977, 1981, 1983), Companion Rules (1984), and Master Rules (1985).

=== Advanced Dungeons & Dragons 2nd Edition ===
The halfling appeared as a character race in the second edition Player's Handbook (1989). The hairfoot halfling, the stout halfling, and the tallfellow halfling also appeared in the Monstrous Compendium Volume One (1989), and Monstrous Manual (1993). The Athasian halfling for the Dark Sun setting first appeared in Dragon #173 (September 1991), and later appeared in the Dark Sun Monstrous Compendium Appendix II: Terrors Beyond Tyr (1995) and Dark Sun Campaign Setting, Expanded and Revised (1995). Several halfling sub-races were detailed as player character races in The Complete Book of Gnomes and Halflings (1993), including the Athasian halfling, the furchin (polar halfling).

=== Dungeons & Dragons 3rd edition ===
The halfling appeared as a character race in the third edition Player's Handbook (2000), and in the 3.5 revised Player's Handbook. The lightfoot halfling, the deep halfling, and the tallfellow halfling appeared in the third edition Monster Manual (2000), and the 3.5 revised Monster Manual (2003). The jerren, a race related to halflings, appeared in the Book of Vile Darkness (2002). The lightfoot halfling, ghostwise halfling, and the strongheart halfling for the Forgotten Realms setting were detailed in the Forgotten Realms Campaign Setting (2001), and in Races of Faerûn (2003). The aquatic halfling, the arctic halfling, the desert halfling, the jungle halfling, the halfling paragon, and the water halfling were detailed in Unearthed Arcana (2004).

=== Dungeons & Dragons 4th edition ===
The halfling appeared as a character race in the fourth edition Player's Handbook (2008) and the Essentials rulebook Heroes of the Fallen Lands. The halfling also appears in the fourth edition Monster Manual (2008).

=== Dungeons & Dragons 5th edition ===
The halfling was included as a player race in the 5th edition Player's Handbook (2014). Two subraces were introduced with it: the lightfoot halfling and the stout halfling. The Player's Handbook also suggests using the statistics of the lightfoot halflings to stand in for the hairfeet halflings and tallfellow halflings of the Greyhawk campaign setting, as well as using the stout halflings to represent the strongheart halflings of the Forgotten Realms.

== Campaign settings ==
The Dragonlance campaign set has a completely different race that fills the niche usually held by halflings, known as kender. They are completely immune to fear, even if magically generated. Described as having a "communal" outlook on property ownership, they are known to wander off while still holding, looking at, or even after pocketing an item that catches their fancy. They do not consider this stealing, but rather only think of it as borrowing the item. Kender have a tendency to discard items for what they deem more valuable (what catches their eye more), at the time of acquiring a new item if they need more space in their pouches.

In Eberron, introduced in 2004, halflings are even more removed from the Tolkien versions. In this world, halflings are a wilderness-loving barbarian race that uses domesticated dinosaurs as mounts. Although they are nomadic and clannish and thus viewed as barbarians by other races, these halflings are still adept at fitting in with civilized peoples when they leave their prairie homes. Some halflings give up their nomadic lifestyle to settle in human cities, but retain strong ties to their heritage.

In the Dark Sun setting, the wiry halflings seldom exceed 3½' in height and live in shaman-ruled settlements in the jungles beyond the mysterious Ringing Mountains. Halflings are the oldest race on Athas. Most of them became barbaric cannibals, while a handful of them inhabited the Pristine Tower. As the setting draws upon Swords and Sorcery pulp fiction, Wargamer writer Timothy Linward saw its jungle-dwelling, "savage, humanoid-eating" halflings as inspired by the trope of "man-eating pygmies, originating in Victorian hysteria around 'savage' indigenous cultures in the regions of the globe Europe was colonising."

== Notable halflings ==
An example of a noteworthy halfling character featured in a series of novels based on the Forgotten Realms, a D&D campaign setting, is Regis, a halfling rogue member of the Companions of the Hall led by Drizzt Do'Urden. While he behaves in the stereotypical manner of Tolkien's hobbits, Bricken from io9 noted that Regis "set himself apart a bit by carrying a crystal pendant he can use to charm people", though he also finds himself in dangerous situations and ends up saving the day in the final battle of The Crystal Shard (1988) in a manner not unlike Bilbo Baggins.

The Iconic rogue in 3rd edition is Lidda, a halfling female.

== Religion ==
In many campaign settings for the Dungeons & Dragons, the halfling pantheon of gods consists of the leader, Yondalla, as well as Arvoreen, Brandobaris, Cyrrollalee, Sheela Peryroyl, and Urogalan.

=== Arvoreen ===
Arvoreen is the halfling deity of protection, vigilance, and war. He is also known as "The Defender." Arvoreen lives in the halfling realm of the Green Fields on the plane of Mount Celestia.

Arvoreen was first detailed in Roger E. Moore's article "The Halfling Point of View," in Dragon #59 (TSR, 1982). In Dragon #92 (December 1984), Gary Gygax indicated this as one of the deities legal for the Greyhawk setting. He also appeared in the original Unearthed Arcana (1985).

Arvoreen was detailed in the book Monster Mythology (1992), including details about his priesthood. The deity's role among his followers was expanded in The Complete Book of Gnomes & Halflings (1993). His role in the cosmology of the Planescape campaign setting was described in On Hallowed Ground (1996). He received a very detailed description for his role in the Forgotten Realms in Demihuman Deities (1998). He is described as one of the good deities that celestials can serve in the supplement Warriors of Heaven (1999).

Arvoreen's role in the Forgotten Realms is revisited in Faiths and Pantheons (2002). He was detailed again in Races of the Wild (2005).

Arvoreen lives in the halfling realm of the Green Fields on the plane of Mount Celestia. Arvoreen's clerics wear silver chainmail and helmets. His sacred animal is the war dog. Arvoreen is worshipped before battle. Silvered weapons are typically sacrificed to him when followers seek his blessing.

Arvoreen's most well noted follower is perhaps Mazzy Fentan, of Baldur's Gate II fame.

=== Brandobaris ===
Brandobaris (BRAN-doe-BAIR-iss) is the halfling deity of stealth, thievery, rogues, and adventuring. His sacred animal is the mouse. His symbol is a halfling's footprint. In Dungeons and Dragons lore, Brandobaris is said to have won a contest of speed and strength against the ogre and troll deity Vaprak, causing the ogres to cede their forested homeland of Luiren to halflings.

Brandobaris was first detailed in Roger E. Moore's article "The Halfling Point of View," in Dragon #59 (TSR, 1982). In Dragon #92 (December 1984), Gary Gygax indicated this as one of the deities legal for the Greyhawk setting. He also appeared in the original Unearthed Arcana (1985).

Brandobaris was detailed in the book Monster Mythology (1992), including details about his priesthood. The deity's role among his followers was expanded in The Complete Book of Gnomes & Halflings (1993). His role in the cosmology of the Planescape campaign setting was described in On Hallowed Ground (1996). He received a very detailed description for his role in the Forgotten Realms in Demihuman Deities (1998). Brandobaris's role in the Forgotten Realms is revisited in Faiths and Pantheons (2002). He was detailed again in Races of the Wild (2005).

=== Cyrrollalee ===
Cyrrollalee is the halfling deity of friendship, trust, and the home. She lives in the halfling realm of the Green Fields on the plane of Mount Celestia. Cyrrollalee appears as a humble-looking halfling woman of homely appearance. She wears brown peasant's garb matching her hair. Her avatar carries two pairs of iron bands of Bilarro.

Cyrrollalee was first detailed in Roger E. Moore's article "The Halfling Point of View," in Dragon #59 (TSR, 1982). In Dragon #92 (December 1984), Gary Gygax indicated this as one of the deities legal for the Greyhawk setting. She also appeared in the original Unearthed Arcana (1985).

Cyrrollalee was detailed in the book Monster Mythology (1992), including details about her priesthood. The deity's role among her followers was expanded in The Complete Book of Gnomes & Halflings (1993). Her role in the cosmology of the Planescape campaign setting was described in On Hallowed Ground (1996). She received a very detailed description for her role in the Forgotten Realms in Demihuman Deities (1998). She is described as one of the good deities that celestials can serve in the supplement Warriors of Heaven (1999). Cyrrollalee's role in the Forgotten Realms is revisited in Faiths and Pantheons (2002). She was detailed again in Races of the Wild (2005).

=== Sheela Peryroyl ===
Sheela Peryroyl is the halfling deity of nature, agriculture, and weather. Her realm of Flowering Hill can be found on the plane of the Outlands. Sheela is generally depicted as a pretty halfling maiden with brightly colored wildflowers woven in her hair. She is quiet, though her face is smiling and her eyes are dancing. She may also be depicted as laughing.

Sheela Peryroyl was first detailed in Roger E. Moore's article "The Halfling Point of View," in Dragon #59 (TSR, 1982). In Dragon #92 (December 1984), Gary Gygax indicated this as one of the deities legal for the Greyhawk setting. She also appeared in the original Unearthed Arcana (1985).

Sheela Peryroyl was detailed in the book Monster Mythology (1992), including details about his priesthood. The deity's role among her followers was expanded in The Complete Book of Gnomes & Halflings (1993). Her role in the cosmology of the Planescape campaign setting was described in On Hallowed Ground (1996). She received a very detailed description for her role in the Forgotten Realms in Demihuman Deities (1998). She is described as one of the good deities that celestials can serve in the supplement Warriors of Heaven (1999). Sheela Peryroyl's role in the Forgotten Realms is revisited in Faiths and Pantheons (2002). She was detailed again in Races of the Wild (2005).

=== Urogalan ===
Urogalan is the halfling deity of earth and death. His symbol is the silhouette of a dog's head. He is a gentle deity for a god of death, respected and revered by his chosen race but never feared. He is seen as a protector of the dead. Urogalan is a slim, dusky-skinned halfling dressed in brown or pure white, representing his two primary aspects of earth and death. Urogalan's realm, Soulearth, is found on the plane of Elysium

Urogalan was first mentioned in Roger Moore's "The Gods of the Halflings" article in Dragon #59 (1982). He was first detailed in the release of Monster Mythology (1992), which included details about his priesthood. His role in the cosmology of the Planescape campaign setting was described in On Hallowed Ground (1996). He received a very detailed description for his role in the Forgotten Realms in Demihuman Deities (1998). Urogalan's role in the Forgotten Realms is revisited in Faiths and Pantheons (2002). He was detailed again in Races of the Wild (2005).

=== Yondalla ===
Yondalla is the chief halfling goddess and a member of the game's 3rd edition "core pantheon". Her symbol is a shield with a cornucopia motif. Yondalla is the goddess of Protection, Fertility, the Halfling Race, Children, Security, Leadership, Diplomacy, Wisdom, the Cycle of Life, Creation, Family and Familial Love, Tradition, Community, Harmony, and Prosperity. Yondalla is represented as a strong female halfling with red-golden hair, looking determined and proud. She dresses in green, yellow, and brown, and carries a shield. Yondalla has two aspects that the halflings speak of in front of others: the Provider and the Protector. As the Provider, she is a goddess of fertility and growing things, of birth and youth. She can make barren things fertile and increase the growing rate of plants and animals to any speed she chooses.

Yondalla is the creator deity for the halfing race in Dungeons and Dragons lore, and different stories and exist throughout the source materials. Dallah Thaun, the Lady of Mysteries, is a deity split from Yondalla according to some lore.

Yondalla was created by James M. Ward for the Deities and Demigods Cyclopedia (1980). Yondalla was detailed in the book Monster Mythology (1992), including details about her priesthood. Her role in the cosmology of the Planescape campaign setting was described in On Hallowed Ground (1996). Yondalla's role among her followers was expanded in The Complete Book of Gnomes & Halflings (1993). Yondalla received a very detailed description for her role in the Forgotten Realms in Demihuman Deities (1998). Yondalla is described as one of the good deities that celestials can serve in the supplement Warriors of Heaven (1999).

Yondalla appears as one of the deities described in the Players Handbook for the 3.0 edition. Yondalla is also detailed in Deities and Demigods (2002), and her role in the Forgotten Realms is revisited in Faiths and Pantheons (2002). Yondalla appears in the revised Players Handbook for 3.5. Her priesthood is detailed for this edition in Complete Divine (2004). She again appears in Races of the Wild (2005).

== Reception ==
Gus Wezerek, for FiveThirtyEight, reported that of the 5th Edition "class and race combinations per 100,000 characters that players created on D&D Beyond from" August 15 to September 15, 2017, halflings were the eighth most created at 5,916 total. The three most popular class combinations with the halfling were Rogue (1,797), Bard (801), and Monk (551). Wezerek noted "some of the common character choices can be explained by the game's structure of racial bonuses".
