= Player's Secrets of Talinie =

Tabletop role-playing game supplement

- Genre: Role-playing games
- Publisher: TSR
- Publication date: 1995

Player's Secrets of Talinie is an accessory for the 2nd edition of the Advanced Dungeons & Dragons fantasy role-playing game, published in 1995.

== Contents ==
Talinie is a theocracy whose heavy woods and mineral-rich lands are extensively exploited, and while this has stimulated the economy it has also resulted in environmental degradation and loss of control of the mining and timber guilds to foreign interests. The army of Boeruine threatens the southern border, while Talinie's high priest aggressively pursues religious unity, and Talinie's wizard has discovered questionably ethical ways to maximize the magical potential of what remains of the land.

== Publication history ==
Player's Secrets of Talinie was published by TSR, Inc. in 1995.

== Reception ==
Cliff Ramshaw reviewed Player's Secrets of Talinie for Arcane magazine, rating it a 6 out of 10 overall. He described Talinie as "a theocracy suitable for rule by a lawful priest or a paladin with a penchant for flowers, but not everything is sweetness and light". He commented that Boeruine "is ready to provide the same sort of support that Czechoslovakia and Afghanistan received from the USSR" and that the high priest "pursues religious unity with a vigour to make Spain's Grand Inquisitor blush". He also felt that there was "the thorny question of progress", where the wizard's plans involve ethics that are "ambiguous to say the least". Ramshaw concluded by saying: "This sourcebook should appeal to the 'set the world to rights' brigade. It's just as well that there's so much going on, though, because the domain itself, for all its crofts, flower gardens and glass blowing, won't hold your interest for long."

== Reviews ==
- Dragon #229
