= Cities of the Sun =

Advanced Dungeons & Dragons accessory

- Genre: Role-playing games
- Publisher: TSR
- Publication date: 1995
- Media type: Boxed set

Cities of the Sun is an accessory for the 2nd edition of the Advanced Dungeons & Dragons fantasy role-playing game, published in 1995.

== Contents ==
Cities of the Sun is a supplement which details the Khinasi people, who inhabit the south-eastern part of the continent of Cerilia. They gather in cities, and only sparsely settle the nearby plains and savannah. The domains of the Khinasi are called states instead of kingdoms, because they do not require noble blood for their rulers. All of their people are counted as free and equal, although individuals can acquire more money and greater influence, and the manners, hospitality, and honor of a character also valued. Magic is more common in Khinasi lands than other places, and spellcasters are greatly respected, while awnsheghlien are also much more common.

The set describes the many states and provinces of this land and how they relate to each other, as well as detailing the notable non-player characters. The set also contains new War Cards for the Khinasi military, including naval units.

New rules for the seafaring Khinasi are presented for trade and warfare at sea. Cities of the Sun gives rules for weather conditions, how to move shipping and handle shipwrecks, along with statistics for various vessels, and information on their costs and upkeep. The trade rules expand the simpler rules in the Birthright Campaign Setting booklet, and the rules for combat are handled similarly to land-based combat. The rules account for ranged and magical attacks, and include boarding maneuvers. The combat rules are also summarized on the naval battle mat intended to be used with the ship cards, while the reverse side of the mat contains a map of the entire region. Reference cards present both information and rules relevant to additional aspects of the Khinasi lands.

Cities of the Sun also includes a brief adventure for 4 to 8 player characters of levels 3–5, who get caught up in a conspiracy involving one of the awnsheghlien and a dangerous noble.

Cities of the Sun outlines states for player characters to govern, explore, and conquer. This book covers the Khinasi states, a region inspired by the Moorish culture of Spain.

== Publication history ==
Cities of the Sun was written by Rich Baker, and was published by TSR in 1995. The cover and conceptual art was by Tony Szczudlo, with interior art by John Dollar and Les Dorscheid, and war card art by Doug Chaffee.

== Reception ==
Cliff Ramshaw reviewed Cities of the Sun for British magazine Arcane, rating it a 6 out of 10 overall. He felt that the set adds "some Arabian spice" to the "pseudo-European mediaeval feudalism permeating most of Cerilia". He felt that the additions to the combat rules add up to "a simple yet robust system that should enable referees to resolve sea battles with speed and excitement". Ramshaw found the adventure included in the set to be "a highly linear affair", and elaborates his feelings about the adventure: "Besides lacking in imagination and freedom of movement, the adventure is crippled by situations where intelligent or merely wild character play will scupper the plot. To prevent this, the referee is forced into taking drastic measures. For instance, the bad guys arrive with sufficient force to overcome the players' naval expedition, whatever their precautions and backup. Worse, one chance for testing the naval combat rules will be missed [...] unless a character sits around doing nothing while everyone else goes exploring. Saldy, the adventure lets down an otherwise solid product."

== Reviews ==
- Dragon #233
- Casus Belli #92
