= Death Unchained =

Death Unchained is an adventure for the 2nd edition of the Advanced Dungeons & Dragons fantasy role-playing game.

== Plot summary ==
Death Unchained is an adventure in which the player characters are continually pursued by a horde of assassins in the regime of Falkovnia as soon as the characters step out from the mists.

== Publication history ==
Death Unchained was published by TSR in 1996, and was designed by Lisa Smedman, with cover art by Fred Fields and interior art by John Dollar.

== Reception ==
Trenton Webb reviewed Death Unchained for Arcane magazine, rating it a 9 out of 10 overall. Webb commented, "without a shadow of a doubt TSR's Death Unchained is a great off-the-shelf AD&D Ravenloft scenario". He declares that the adventure has "plenty of Hammer-horror atmosphere, but this time it's more akin to the paranoid fears of Witchfinder General than the schlock of Frankenstein". He called it a "hard core horror-fest" that "doesn't let up" against the player characters in its "non-stop chase through grim city streets and a beautifully labyrinthe dungeon complex". He notes that, for the DM, "it's a well-balanced adventure guide - it's strict enough to maintain direction but with enough flexibility and troubleshooting options to be useful under game conditions". Webb felt that Death Unchained's insight comes from "its more mainstream feel", as while he feels that many Ravenloft scenarios "have a late-Georgian atmosphere in which demi-humans and magic feel a tad anachronistic", this adventure "revels in a far more medieval flavour, essentially being set in downtown Transylvania at the time of Vlad Tepes". Webb concludes the review by saying: "Pushed along at a frantic pace, filled with plenty of clues which are clear enough for players to find and follow, and with a varied cast of refreshingly different villains, Death Unchained opens a promising trilogy. What's more, with its mainstream feel it's ideal for other world parties to test the murky waters of Ravenloft. However, if this is your first foray into the Demiplane of Dread, be warned - it's a real character killer."
