= Player's Secrets of Khourane =

1996 role-playing game accessory

- Genre: Role-playing games
- Publisher: TSR
- Publication date: 1996

Player's Secrets of Khourane is an accessory for the 2nd edition of the Advanced Dungeons & Dragons fantasy role-playing game, published in 1996.

== Contents ==
Player's Secrets of Khourane is a supplement that details the domain of Khourane for a player character regent, inhabited by the sophisticated Khinasi, with thick jungles populated by xenophobic elves and known for its mysterious legends, while the land is bordered by hostile awnshegh. As with the other supplements in the Player's Secrets series, the cover contains a series of maps of the domain as well as layouts for palace of the Emira.

== Publication history ==
Player's Secrets of Khourane was published by TSR, Inc. in 1996.

== Reception ==
David Comford reviewed Player's Secrets of Khourane for Arcane magazine, rating it an 8 out of 10 overall. He comments that "The Player's Secrets series is a mixed bunch – thankfully, though, this latest release is one of the better volumes." He describes Khourane as "exotic and exciting" and feels that "The true strength of Khourane, however, is in its exoticism. After a series of campaigns set virtually in the same surroundings, players and referees alike begin to feel the need for a change, and I for one usually slip in an adventure or two from another games system to break up the monotony of it all. Birthright gets around this problem by opening up a number of differing lands to adventurers." Comford commented that "Khourane has a distinctly Arabian flavor exhibiting a refreshingly different culture, and in addition the populace has a humane outlook on life - together these factors make an excellent change of flavor during a campaign or series of adventures. The domain has plenty of potential for all manner of internal adventures, and additional aspects such as a mysteriously sealed dwarven city can be woven into an existing campaign." He found that the maps on the cover were "handy" and "well-drawn" and found that "The supplement itself is also very well structured and thankfully easy to read." Comford concluded the review by saying "It is a pity that the profiles of the bordering awnshegh aren't presented because they exert a considerable influence over the domain, but [...] The Player's Secrets of Khourane is nevertheless well worth a look."
