= Simon Hawke =

American author (born 1951)

- Born: Nicholas Valentin Yermakov; September 30, 1951 (age 75)
- Occupation: Author
- Writing career
- Pen name: Simon Hawke; J. D. Masters
- Genres: Science fiction; fantasy

Simon Hawke, born September 30, 1951, in New York, the son of Valentin M. Yermakov (a pathologist) and Helga E. née Hartewelt (a United Nations verbatim reporter), is an American author of mainly fantasy and science fiction novels. He was born Nicholas Valentin Yermakov, but began writing as Simon Hawke in 1984 and later changed his legal name to Simon Hawke. He has also published near future adventure novels using the pseudonym J. D. Masters and a series of humorous mystery novels. He was the Colorado Writer of the Year, 1992. He married and has had children.

== Career ==
As Nicholas Yermakov (he is half-Russian), his early books were published during 1981–1984, including two Battlestar Galactica novelizations. Since he began using the name Simon Hawke in 1984, he has produced a large quantity of fiction. Almost all of his books published after 1984 have been either part of a series and/or tie-in novels and novelizations.

His first major work as Simon Hawke was the Timewars series, which recounts the adventures of an organization tasked with protecting history from being changed by time travellers. In the world of the series, many people and events we consider fictional are historical, and vice versa; the action of each book in the series weaves in and out of the events of a famous work of literature. For example, in the first book in the series time travellers contesting the fate of Richard I of England become involved with the events of Walter Scott's Ivanhoe.

He has also published a series of humorous murder mysteries which features a young William Shakespeare and a fictional friend, Symington "Tuck" Smythe.

In 2017, he received the Phoenix Award from DeepSouthCon 55.

== Bibliography ==
Boomerang (as Nicholas Yermakov)

- Last Communion (1981)
- Epiphany (1982)
- Jehad (1984)

TimeWars

- The Ivanhoe Gambit (1984)
- The Timekeeper Conspiracy (1984)
- The Pimpernel Plot (1984)
- The Zenda Vendetta (1985)
- The Nautilus Sanction (1985)
- The Khyber Connection (1986)
- The Argonaut Affair (1987)
- The Dracula Caper (1988)
- The Lilliput Legion (1989)
- The Hellfire Rebellion (1990)
- The Cleopatra Crisis (1990)
- The Six-Gun Solution (1991)

Psychodrome

- Psychodrome (1987)
- Psychodrome 2: The Shapechanger Scenario (1988)
- PSYCHODROME III: The Invasion: 3 (2020)

Wizard of 4th Street

- The Wizard of 4th Street (1987)
- The Wizard of Whitechapel (1988)
- The Wizard of Sunset Strip (1989)
- The Wizard of Rue Morgue (1990)
- The Samurai Wizard (1991)
- The Wizard of Santa Fe (1991)
- The Wizard of Camelot (1993)
- The Wizard of Lovecraft's Cafe (1993)
- The 9 Lives of Catseye Gomez (1991 [spinoff, a 28-page short story published by Roadkill Press]
- The Nine Lives of Catseye Gomez (1992) [spinoff novel, expansion of the previous title]
- The Last Wizard (1997)

Donovan Steele (as J. D. Masters)

- Steele (June 1989)
- Cold Steele (October 1989)
- Killer Steele (January 1990)
- Jagged Steele (May 1990)
- Renegade Steele (September 1990)
- Target Steele (November 1990)

The Reluctant Sorcerer

- The Reluctant Sorcerer (1992)
- The Inadequate Adept (1993)
- The Ambivalent Magician (1997)

Battlestar Galactica (novelizations, as Nicholas Yermakov)

- Battlestar Galactica #6: The Living Legend (1982) (with Glen Larson)
- Battlestar Galactica #7: War of the Gods (1982) (with Glen Larson)

Star Trek

- Star Trek #69: The Patrian Transgression (1994)
- Star Trek, the Next Generation #26: The Romulan Prize (1993)
- Star Trek, the Next Generation #34: Blaze of Glory (1995)

Novelizations

- Predator 2 (1990)
- To Stalk a Specter (1991)
- Friday the 13th, Part I (1987)
- Friday the 13th, Part II (1988)
- Friday the 13th, Part III (1988)
- Jason Lives: Friday the 13th, Part VI (1986)

Dungeons & Dragons

- The Outcast (1993)
- The Seeker (1994)
- The Nomad (1994)
- The Broken Blade (1995)
- The Iron Throne (1995)
- War (1996)

Shakespeare & Smythe mysteries

- A Mystery of Errors (2000)
- The Slaying of the Shrew (2001)
- Much Ado About Murder (2002)
- The Merchant of Vengeance (2003)

Robin Hood & Associates

- The Case of the Manufactured Girl (2020)
- The Case of the Invisible Face (2020)
- The Case of the Artificial Vampire (2021)
- The Case of the Rebooted Man (2022)
- The Case of the Alternative Mind (2024)

Standalone novels

- Journey from Flesh (1981) (as Nicholas Yermakov)
- Clique (1982) (as Nicholas Yermakov)
- Fall Into Darkness (1982) (as Nicholas Yermakov)
- Sons of Glory: Call to Battle (1993)
- The Whims of Creation (1995)
