= Birthright Campaign Setting =

Role playing game accessory

- Genre: Role-playing games
- Publisher: TSR
- Publication date: 1995
- Media type: Boxed set

Birthright Campaign Setting is an accessory for the 2nd edition of the Advanced Dungeons & Dragons fantasy role-playing game, published in 1995. This product introduced the Birthright campaign setting.

== Contents ==
The Birthright Campaign Setting contains three books, a gamemaster's screen, two maps, over 100 cards to use for resolving large battles, and 12 reference cards, all of which are in full color. The set includes a new combat system for large fantasy army battles, where cards represent regiments and a position sheet indicate which side is holding the line and which is on the flank.

The set includes the concept of bloodlines, magical powers gained from a family line which tie them a domain, and in which strong bloodlines produce natural leaders; these powerful characters have the awnsheghlien as powerful foes, champions coming from the world's evil bloodlines. Also described are "domain turns", three month periods of time for a domain during which background events occur. The campaign was later recognised as the first setting to support player characters as rulers, providing players with a game based on "diplomacy, politics, trade, construction and (of course) war".

The three books are the Rule Book which includes character creation and the rules for running domain-level play, the Atlas of Cerilia which is overview of the history and geography of the game setting continent of Cerilia, and Ruins of Empire which a sourcebook outlining domains and key characters in the region of Anuire. Anuire is influenced by medieval England and France.

== Publication history ==
The Birthright Campaign Setting was designed by Rich Baker and Colin McComb.

== Reception ==
The Birthright Campaign Setting set won the Origins Award for New Role-Playing Supplement in 1995.

Scott Haring reviewed the Birthright Campaign Setting for Pyramid #16 (November/December 1995). Haring thought that Birthright presented a new take on power gaming: "The trick in power gaming is to make the players feel the responsibilities that accompany great power, but to keep it fun. And that's where Birthright comes in. Other games have tried to do fantasy roleplaying on a kingdom-wide scale; Birthright is the first to succeed." He felt that the setting was a "fairly typical high fantasy world (though not without its twists)", but that the concept of bloodlines made for an important difference. He felt that the domain turns keep things moving in the game, making the Birthright world more realistic. Haring concluded that the set was "an outstanding addition to the AD&D line" and its take on power gaming "will have you taking a second look at the concept. Highly recommended."

== Reviews ==
- Preview: Shadis #21
- Dragon #224
- Shadis #24
- Rollespilsmagasinet Fønix (Danish) (Issue 12 - Mar/Apr 1996)
- Casus Belli #89
- Casus Belli #90
- Dragão Brasil #14
- Realms of Fantasy
