= Player's Secrets of Stjordvik =

Role-playing game supplement

- Cover
- Genre: Role-playing game
- Publisher: TSR
- Media type: Print

Player's Secrets of Stjordvik is a supplement to the 2nd edition of the Advanced Dungeons & Dragons fantasy role-playing game.

== Contents ==
Player's Secrets of Stjordvik is a supplement which details the realm of Stjordvik which is in disorder due to a series of weak rulers.

== Publication history ==
Player's Secrets of Stjordvik was published by TSR, Inc. in 1996.

== Reception ==
David Comford reviewed Player's Secrets of Stjordvik for Arcane magazine, rating it a 4 out of 10 overall. He commented that "Stjordvik is another of those realms in political turmoil -though here it has more to do with a weak succession of rulers than any open rebellion. Your first task - should you choose to accept it - is to boot out a couple of jarls and, while basking in the applause from your subjects, tax them like they've never been taxed before to restore the neglected road system and the Great Oak wall - the only barrier between Rjuvik's raiders, the Blood Skull Barony and your recently acquired realm." Comford added: "The Player's Secrets of Stjordvik is a good volume, but unfortunately nothing leaps out of the content and grabs you demanding to be taken in hand. Stjordvik is a land where internal division is threatening to give a fatal advantage to outside threats. And that's basically it." He continued: "A decent campaign could be staged if part of the realm has already been overrun, and the players have to restore the peace before turning to the squabbling jarls - but this is about as good as it gets. The idea of political division is not a new one, and there is nothing depicted here that any Birthright referee or player could not have thought of." Comford concluded the review by saying, "If this is to be your first domain, then it is a good starting point to gain experience as a regent - but if you are looking for a new domain with fresh challenges you will be disappointed, and would be well advised to buy some paper and a pen and devise your own domain."
