= Forged of Darkness =

Tabletop role-playing game supplement

- Genre: Role-playing games
- Publisher: TSR
- Publication date: 1996

Forged of Darkness is an accessory for the 2nd edition of the Advanced Dungeons & Dragons fantasy role-playing game, published in 1996.

== Contents ==
Forged of Darkness is a supplement which presents nine magical artifacts for the Ravenloft setting, and provides details on the in-game history of each item. Each of these items described can give great powers to characters, but using them comes with a high price.

== Publication history ==
Forged of Darkness was published by TSR, Inc. in 1996.

== Reception ==
Trenton Webb reviewed Forged of Darkness for Arcane magazine, rating it an 8 out of 10 overall. He called the book's artifacts "ungodly", noting that each one "has its own vile history and, used properly, a wonderfully evil future". He felt that the powers of each item were great "but not extreme", and the price for a character using one was "suitably nasty", describing the items as "refreshingly bizarre, not limited to the normal swords, shields, rods and rings, which makes working out their powers and curses that more entertaining. Webb considered the creations of master toy maker Giuseppe, the time pieces fashioned in the Workshops of Klorr and the Hands of the Dead to be the highlights: "As collections they offer a wide range of intertwined powers around a single theme, which adds to the all pervading sense of menace." Webb concluded by saying: "All referees who manipulate a Ravenloft world will want to unearth these items. Low-levellers can be sent to recover or transport them for others, while more potent players will get some serious fun from playing with these toys. They're dangerous, but for Ravenloft that's ideal."
