= The Rjurik Highlands =

1996 role-playing game accessory

- Genre: Role-playing games
- Publisher: TSR
- Publication date: 1996
- Media type: Boxed set

The Rjurik Highlands is an accessory for the 2nd edition of the Advanced Dungeons & Dragons fantasy role-playing game, published in 1996.

== Contents ==
The Rjurik Highlands is a supplement which describes the land of the Rjurik people, a wilderness frontier of northwestern Cerilia. The Rjurik can manifest the berserk rage of the Vos and the druids lead the Rjurik with their teachings, giving the Rjurik a reputation throughout Cerilia because of their skill as warriors and the high quality of their weapons and armor. The sourcebook contains expanded character generation rules which give Rjurik characters unique abilities, such as modified class abilities for the bard and druid as well as innate Rjurik curses. The book details culture and society of the many Rjurik tribes, the tense relationship between the still nomadic tribes and those who have settled, and full geographical information of the highland areas. There are many possible domains in this land for a potential emperor, including the wild land of Taelshore, the tundra and virgin woods of the northlands, and the desolate Wildlands. Each domain is presented using a two-page layout describing the law, guilds and temples in each nations, along with the magical sources that can be found there and who has claimed possession of them, and notable non-player characters, allies and enemies, the state of trade in the area, and the armed forces the player characters can access. Each region is dominated by political and social strain, and they must contend with powerful anwnshegh such as the White Witch surrounding them, alliances of humanoids who want to conquer them, and ambitious rivals. Six cardsheets are included which detail significant populated settlements, major NPCs, tips for adventuring, and a layout for players to plan and keep track of their ambitions for Rjurik domains territory.

The Rjurik Highlands describes the wilds of northwestern Cerilia, where dwell the fearsome but honorable warriors, the Rjurik, and their unique druidic priests. This package is designed to give a complete picture of the lands and peoples it addresses and to lay out the realm for use by DMs and players who wish to rule its varied kingdoms. The inspiration for the region comes from the cultures of the Celts and Viking (Nordic countries: Scandinavia).

== Publication history ==
The Rjurik Highlands was published by TSR, Inc. in 1996.

== Reception ==
David Comford reviewed The Rjurik Highlands for Arcane magazine, rating it a 9 out of 10 overall. He describes the culture of the Rjurik as "seemingly born from a blend of North American Indian traditions and beliefs, and barbarian/Viking brute strength". Comford declares that The Rjurik Highlands has to be an essential addition to any Birthright referee's collection. The sourcebook is well planned and presented." He states: "Not only does The Rjurik Highlands expansion provide excellent material for adventuring, but the new warcards for the famed warriors are a must for any armed force - whether allied or opposed to the PCs. The brute strength of the north races shines through additional bonuses and the amount of hits that each unit can take before it is destroyed." Comford concludes his review by saying, "With first-class artwork to complement the text, it's hard to find fault here. The warcards are a little tame for the legendary fighters, and the sourcebook is repetitious - but this by no means detracts from the book's excellent content."

== Reviews ==
- Dragon #233
