= The Complete Book of Gnomes & Halflings =

- Genre: Role-playing games
- Publisher: TSR
- Publication date: 1993

The Complete Book of Gnomes & Halflings is an accessory for the 2nd edition of the Advanced Dungeons & Dragons fantasy role-playing game, published in 1993.

== Contents ==
The 127-page book has slightly more halfling coverage. Both sections cover "gods and myth, racial divisions, culture, character kits, and a typical village". Reviewer Eisenbeis noted that due to an oversight "the powers acquired by the priests of each deity are not given", which is necessary for gameplay. The respective culture sections are excellent, providing players and dungeon masters advantages in character development and gameplay. Additionally, the character kit section contains 10 gnome and 18 halfling kits.

== Publication history ==
The Complete Book of Gnomes & Halflings was published by TSR, Inc. in 1993.

== Reception ==
Keith H. Eisenbeis reviewed the book in White Wolf Magazine No. 38. Overall, he rated it a 3 out of a possible 5. He assessed the product as follows:

The Complete Book of Gnomes and Halflings is useful to a player who is especially interested in either of these races. Unfortunately, the handbook tends to portray both in an almost comical fashion at times. This presentation significantly detracts from gnome and halflings' places as heroic races, and contributes to their overshadowing by the more "serious" races. What is lacking here is a sense of each race's own quiet nobility.
