= Ogrillon =

Ogrillon (pronounced /oʊˈɡrɪlən/) may refer to:

- a child ogre
- Ogrillon (Dungeons & Dragons), a fictional creature in Dungeons & Dragons
