= Planetar =

Planetar may refer to:

- Planetar (astronomy), a type of extrasolar planet
- Planetar (Dungeons & Dragons), a fictional type of angel in Dungeons & Dragons
